= 2023 European Short Course Swimming Championships =

Water sport competitions

- Host city: Otopeni, Romania
- Date: 5–10 December
- Venue: Aquatics Complex
- Events: 42

The 2023 European Short Course Swimming Championships (25 m) also known as Otopeni 2023 were held in Otopeni, Romania, from 5 to 10 December 2023 at the Aquatics Complex. These are the 22nd edition of the biennial championships organized by European Aquatics, contested in a short course 25-metre pool.

== Medal table ==
* Host nation (Romania)

Rank	Nation	Gold	Silver	Bronze	Total
1	Great Britain	9	8	6	23
2	Italy	7	12	3	22
3	France	7	10	6	23
4	Netherlands	6	0	5	11
5	Sweden	4	1	2	7
6	Switzerland	3	1	1	5
7	Ireland	3	0	1	4
8	Germany	1	2	0	3
9	Estonia	1	1	0	2
10	Greece	1	0	4	5
11	Austria	1	0	1	2
12	Hungary	0	2	3	5
13	Denmark	0	2	1	3
14	Lithuania	0	1	2	3
15	Czech Republic	0	1	1	2
16	Iceland	0	1	0	1
17	Belgium	0	0	2	2
17	Romania*	0	0	2	2
17	Ukraine	0	0	2	2
20	Bosnia and Herzegovina	0	0	1	1
20	Turkey	0	0	1	1
Totals (21 entries)		43	42	44	129

== Results ==
=== Men's events ===
Event	Gold		Silver		Bronze	
50 m freestyle	Benjamin Proud; Great Britain	20.18; ER	Florent Manaudou; France Szebasztián Szabó; Hungary	20.74	Not awarded	
100 m freestyle	Maxime Grousset; France	45.46	Alessandro Miressi; Italy	45.51; NR	David Popovici; Romania	46.05
200 m freestyle	Matt Richards; Great Britain	1:41.01	James Guy; Great Britain	1:41.12	Danas Rapšys; Lithuania	1:41.15
400 m freestyle	Daniel Wiffen; Ireland	3:35.47; NR	Danas Rapšys; Lithuania	3:37.80	Lucas Henveaux; Belgium	3:37.91; NR
800 m freestyle	Daniel Wiffen; Ireland	7:20.46; WR	David Aubry; France	7:30.32	Mykhailo Romanchuk; Ukraine	7:31.20
1500 m freestyle	Daniel Wiffen; Ireland	14:09.11; NR	David Aubry; France	14:21.78	Mykhailo Romanchuk; Ukraine	14:22.18
50 m backstroke	Mewen Tomac; France	22.84	Ole Braunschweig; Germany	23.00	Lorenzo Mora; Italy Thierry Bollin; Switzerland	23.10 23.10 =NR
100 m backstroke	Mewen Tomac; France	49.72	Yohann Ndoye-Brouard; France	49.96	Lorenzo Mora; Italy Andrei Ungur; Romania	50.04
200 m backstroke	Lorenzo Mora; Italy	1:48.43; NR	Luke Greenbank; Great Britain	1:48.53; NR	Mewen Tomac; France	1:48.55; NR
50 m breaststroke	Nicolò Martinenghi; Italy	25.66	Simone Cerasuolo; Italy	25.83	Huseyin Emre Sakci; Turkey	25.90
100 m breaststroke	Arno Kamminga; Netherlands	56.52	Nicolò Martinenghi; Italy	56.57	Caspar Corbeau; Netherlands	56.66
200 m breaststroke	Caspar Corbeau; Netherlands	2:02.41	Anton McKee; Iceland	2:02.74	Arno Kamminga; Netherlands	2:03.32
50 m butterfly	Noè Ponti; Switzerland	21.79; NR	Szebasztián Szabó; Hungary	21.96	Maxime Grousset; France	22.06; NR
100 m butterfly	Noè Ponti; Switzerland	48.47; ER	Maxime Grousset; France	49.00	Jacob Peters; Great Britain	49.98
200 m butterfly	Noè Ponti; Switzerland	1:49.71	Alberto Razzetti; Italy	1:50.10	Richárd Márton; Hungary	1:52.12
100 m individual medley	Bernhard Reitshammer; Austria	51.39; NR	Noè Ponti; Switzerland	51.62; NR	Andreas Vazaios; Greece	51.91
200 m individual medley	Duncan Scott; Great Britain	1:50.98; NR	Alberto Razzetti; Italy	1:53.09	Danas Rapšys; Lithuania	1:53.49
400 m individual medley	Alberto Razzetti; Italy	3:57.01; CR, NR	Duncan Scott; Great Britain	4:00.17	Apostolos Papastamos; Greece	4:05.19
4 × 50 m freestyle relay	Great Britain; Benjamin Proud (20.56); Matt Richards (20.50); Alexander Cohoon (20.99); Lewis Burras (20.47); Duncan Scott	1:22.52; NR	Italy; Leonardo Deplano (21.05); Lorenzo Zazzeri (20.50); Thomas Ceccon (20.98); Alessandro Miressi (20.61); Giovanni Izzo	1:23.14	Greece; Kristian Gkolomeev (21.15); Stergios Marios Bilas (21.02); Apostolos Christou (20.58); Andreas Vazaios (20.52)	1:23.27; NR
4 × 50 m medley relay	Italy; Lorenzo Mora (22.98); Nicolò Martinenghi (25.32); Thomas Ceccon (22.05); Lorenzo Zazzeri (20.43); Federico Poggio; Giovanni Izzo	1:30.78	Great Britain; Oliver Morgan (23.48); Archie Goodburn (26.20); Jacob Peters (22.20); Matt Richards (20.72); Jonathon Adam; Edward Mildred; Alexander Cohoon	1:32.60	Netherlands; Jesse Puts (24.53); Caspar Corbeau (25.50); Sean Niewold (22.39); Kenzo Simons (20.61); Thom de Boer	1:33.03

=== Women's events ===
Event	Gold		Silver		Bronze	
50 m freestyle	Michelle Coleman; Sweden	23.52	Béryl Gastaldello; France	23.71	Julie Kepp Jensen; Denmark	23.89
100 m freestyle	Béryl Gastaldello; France	51.48	Anna Hopkin; Great Britain	51.66	Freya Anderson; Great Britain	52.10
200 m freestyle	Freya Anderson; Great Britain	1:52.16	Barbora Seemanová; Czech Republic	1:52.66 =NR	Freya Colbert; Great Britain	1:54.07
400 m freestyle	Simona Quadarella; Italy	3:59.50	Anastasiia Kirpichnikova; France	3:59.56	Valentine Dumont; Belgium	4:00.84
800 m freestyle	Anastasiia Kirpichnikova; France	8:08.48	Simona Quadarella; Italy	8:14.83	Ajna Késely; Hungary	8:18.73
1500 m freestyle	Anastasiia Kirpichnikova; France	15:20.12; NR	Simona Quadarella; Italy	15:37.05	Ajna Késely; Hungary	15:51.34; NR
50 m backstroke	Kira Toussaint; Netherlands	25.82	Louise Hansson; Sweden	26.23	Analia Pigrée; France	26.28
100 m backstroke	Kira Toussaint; Netherlands	55.88	Medi Harris; Great Britain	56.81	Mary-Ambre Moluh; France	57.10
200 m backstroke	Medi Harris; Great Britain	2:02.45	Katie Shanahan; Great Britain	2:03.22	Pauline Mahieu; France	2:03.90
50 m breaststroke	Benedetta Pilato; Italy	28.86; CR	Eneli Jefimova; Estonia	29.12	Jasmine Nocentini; Italy Imogen Clark; Great Britain	29.41
100 m breaststroke	Eneli Jefimova; Estonia	1:03.21; NR	Benedetta Pilato; Italy	1:03.76	Tes Schouten; Netherlands	1:04.04
200 m breaststroke	Tes Schouten; Netherlands	2:16.09; NR	Thea Blomsterberg; Denmark	2:19.54	Kristýna Horská; Czech Republic	2:19.63; NR
50 m butterfly	Anna Ntountounaki; Greece Tessa Giele; Netherlands	25.10	Not awarded		Sara Junevik; Sweden	25.16
100 m butterfly	Louise Hansson; Sweden	55.37	Angelina Köhler; Germany	55.50; NR	Anna Ntountounaki; Greece	55.98; NR
200 m butterfly	Angelina Köhler; Germany	2:03.30	Helena Rosendahl Bach; Denmark	2:03.86	Lana Pudar; Bosnia and Herzegovina	2:04.55; NR
100 m individual medley	Charlotte Bonnet; France	57.47	Béryl Gastaldello; France	57.67	Louise Hansson; Sweden	58.33
200 m individual medley	Abbie Wood; Great Britain	2:05.58	Charlotte Bonnet; France	2:06.58; NR	Lena Kreundl; Austria	2:06.89; NR
400 m individual medley	Abbie Wood; Great Britain	4:27.45	Freya Colbert; Great Britain	4:29.04	Ellen Walshe; Ireland	4:29.64
4 × 50 m freestyle relay	Sweden; Sara Junevik (24.31); Michelle Coleman (23.29); Louise Hansson (23.95); Sofia Åstedt (24.05); Klara Thormalm; Hanna Bergman	1:35.60	Italy; Silvia Di Pietro (24.39); Costanza Cocconcelli (24.21); Chiara Tarantino (24.20); Sara Curtis (24.12)	1:36.92	Great Britain; Anna Hopkin (23.97); Freya Anderson (24.23); Lucy Hope (24.49); Medi Harris (24.50)	1:37.19
4 × 50 m medley relay	Sweden; Louise Hansson (26.47); Sophie Hansson (28.96); Sara Junevik (24.76); Michelle Coleman (23.07); Klara Thormalm; Emmy Hällkvist; Sofia Åstedt	1:43.26	Italy; Costanza Cocconcelli (26.87); Benedetta Pilato (28.75); Silvia Di Pietro (25.19); Jasmine Nocentini (23.16); Anita Bottazzo	1:43.97; NR	Great Britain; Kathleen Dawson (26.97); Imogen Clark (28.66); Keanna Macinnes (25.69); Anna Hopkin (23.35); Kara Hanlon; Laura Stephens; Freya Anderson	1:44.67; NR

=== Mixed events ===
Event	Gold		Silver		Bronze	
4 × 50 m freestyle relay	Great Britain; Benjamin Proud (20.39); Lewis Burras (20.69); Anna Hopkin (22.95); Freya Anderson (23.72); Alexander Cohoon; Lucy Hope	1:27.75 CR, NR	Italy; Alessandro Miressi (20.87); Lorenzo Zazzeri (20.48); Jasmine Nocentini (23.39); Silvia di Pietro (23.54); Leonardo Deplano; Giovanni Izzo; Sara Curtis	1:28.28; NR	France; Maxime Grousset (21.04); Florent Manaudou (20.50); Charlotte Bonnet (23.54); Beryl Gastaldello (23.27); Stanislas Huille; Analia Pigrée; Pauline Mahieu	1:28.35
4 × 50 m medley relay	Italy; Lorenzo Mora (23.01); Nicolo Martinenghi (24.87); Silvia di Pietro (25.32); Jasmine Nocentini (23.38); Matteo Rivolta; Federico Poggio	1:36.58	France; Mewen Tomac (22.83); Florent Manaudou (25.70); Beryl Gastaldello (24.92); Charlotte Bonnet (23.69); Stanislas Huille; Mary-Ambre Moluh; Analia Pigrée	1:37.14; NR	Netherlands; Kira Toussaint (26.17); Caspar Corbeau (25.83); Tessa Giele (25.30); Kenzo Simons (20.56); Arno Kamminga; Sean Niewold; Valerie van Roon	1:37.86
