= List of French records in swimming =

This is a listing of the French records in swimming. They are the fastest times ever swum by a swimmer representing France (or one of its outlying areas) in both 50 m and 25 m swimming courses.

The records are maintained/recognized by France's national swimming federation: Fédération Française de Natation (FFN).

== Long course (50 m) ==
=== Men ===
Event	Time		Name	Club	Date	Meet	Location	Ref
50 m freestyle	20.94	ER	Frédérick Bousquet	CN Marseille	26 April 2009	French Championships	Montpellier, France	
100 m freestyle	46.94	sf	Alain Bernard	CN Antibes	23 April 2009	French Championships	Montpellier, France	
200 m freestyle	1:43.14		Yannick Agnel	France	30 July 2012	Olympic Games	London, Great Britain	
400 m freestyle	3:43.14		Léon Marchand	France	16 August 2026	European Championships	Paris, France	
800 m freestyle	7:42.08		David Aubry	France	24 July 2019	World Championships	Gwangju, South Korea	
1500 m freestyle	14:44.66		David Aubry	France	4 August 2024	Olympic Games	Paris, France	
50m backstroke	24.07		Camille Lacourt	France	12 August 2010	European Championships	Budapest, Hungary	
100m backstroke	51.92		Yohann Ndoye-Brouard	France	29 July 2025	World Championships	Singapore, Singapore	
200m backstroke	1:54.47	sf	Yohann Ndoye-Brouard	France	31 July 2025	World Championships	Singapore, Singapore	
50m breaststroke	26.93	sf	Antoine Viquerat	France	29 July 2025	World Championships	Singapore, Singapore	
100m breaststroke	58.64		Hugues Duboscq	France	27 July 2009	World Championships	Rome, Italy	
200m breaststroke	2:05.85	ER	Léon Marchand	France	31 July 2024	Olympic Games	Paris, France	
50m butterfly	22.48		Maxime Grousset	France	28 July 2025	World Championships	Singapore, Singapore	
100m butterfly	49.62	ER	Maxime Grousset	France	2 August 2025	World Championships	Singapore, Singapore	
200m butterfly	1:51.21		Léon Marchand	France	31 July 2024	Olympic Games	Paris, France	
200m individual medley	1:52.69	sf, WR	Léon Marchand	France	30 July 2025	World Championships	Singapore, Singapore	
400m individual medley	4:02.50	WR	Léon Marchand	France	23 July 2023	World Championships	Fukuoka, Japan	
4×100m freestyle relay	3:08.32	ER	Amaury Leveaux (47.91); Fabien Gilot (47.05); Frédérick Bousquet (46.63); Alain Bernard (46.73)	France	11 August 2008	Olympic Games	Beijing, China	
4×200m freestyle relay	7:02.77		Amaury Leveaux (1:46.70); Grégory Mallet (1:46.83); Clément Lefert (1:46.00); Yannick Agnel (1:43.24)	France	31 July 2012	Olympic Games	London, Great Britain	
4×200m freestyle relay	7:02.23	#	Léon Marchand (1:43.76); Pierre Largeron (1:47.44); Sauveur Cristofini (1:45.28); Roman Fuchs (1:45.75)	France	10 August 2026	European Championships	Paris, France	
4×100m medley relay	3:27.96		Yohann Ndoye-Brouard (52.26); Léon Marchand (58.44); Maxime Grousset (49.27); Yann le Goff (47.99)	France	3 August 2025	World Championships	Singapore, Singapore	

Legend: # – Record awaiting ratification by French Swimming Federation; WR – World record; ER – European record; e – equalled existing record;
Records not set in finals: h – heat; sf – semifinal; r – relay 1st leg; rh – relay heat 1st leg; b – B final; † – en route to final mark; so – swim-off; tt – time trial

=== Women ===
Event	Time		Name	Club	Date	Meet	Location	Ref
50 m freestyle	24.34	h	Mélanie Henique	CN Marseille	12 December 2020	French Championships	Saint-Raphaël, France	
100 m freestyle	52.74		Charlotte Bonnet	Olympic Nice Natation	26 May 2018	French Championships	Saint-Raphaël, France	
200 m freestyle	1:54.66		Camille Muffat	France	6 June 2012	Mare Nostrum	Canet-en-Roussillon, France	
400 m freestyle	4:01.13		Camille Muffat	Olympic Nice Natation	19 March 2012	French Olympic Trials	Dunkirk, France	
800 m freestyle	8:18.80		Laure Manaudou	France	31 March 2007	World Championships	Melbourne, Australia	
1500 m freestyle	15:40.35		Anastasia Kirpichnikova	France	31 July 2024	Olympic Games	Paris, France	
50m backstroke	27.06		Mary-Ambre Moluh	France	13 August 2026	European Championships	Paris, France	
100m backstroke	57.94	ER	Mary-Ambre Moluh	France	15 August 2026	European Championships	Paris, France	
200m backstroke	2:06.64		Laure Manaudou	Mulhouse ON	26 April 2008	French Championships	Dunkirk, France	
50m breaststroke	30.82	h	Charlotte Bonnet	Olympic Nice Natation	16 June 2023	French Championships	Rennes, France	
100m breaststroke	1:07.30		Charlotte Bonnet	Genève Natation 1885	25 May 2024	Meeting of the city of Renens	Renens, Switzerland	
200m breaststroke	2:25.12	sf	Justine Delmas	France	8 July 2021	European Junior Championships	Rome, Italy	
50m butterfly	25.17		Mélanie Henique	CN Marseille	19 June 2021	French Championships	Chartres, France	
100m butterfly	56.14		Marie Wattel	France	19 June 2022	World Championships	Budapest, Hungary	
200m butterfly	2:05.09	sf	Aurore Mongel	France	29 July 2009	World Championships	Rome, Italy	
200m individual medley	2:09.37		Camille Muffat	Olympic Nice Natation	26 April 2009	French Championships	Montpellier, France	
400m individual medley	4:34.17		Fantine Lesaffre	France	3 August 2018	European Championships	Glasgow, Great Britain	
4×100m freestyle relay	3:34.62		Béryl Gastaldello (53.58); Marina Jehl (54.12); Albane Cachot (53.95); Marie Wattel (52.97)	France	27 July 2025	World Championships	Singapore, Singapore	
4×100m freestyle relay	3:33.91	#	Marie Wattel (53.69); Béryl Gastaldello (53.42); Albane Cachot (53.27); Mary-Ambre Moluh (53.53)	France	12 August 2026	European Championships	Paris, France	
4×200 m freestyle relay	7:47.49		Camille Muffat (1:55.51); Charlotte Bonnet (1:57.78); Ophélie-Cyrielle Étienne (1:58.05); Coralie Balmy (1:56.15)	France	1 August 2012	Olympic Games	London, Great Britain	
4×100m medley relay	3:56.29		Emma Terebo (59.00); Charlotte Bonnet (1:06.85); Marie Wattel (57.29); Béryl Gastaldello (53.15)	France	3 August 2024	Olympic Games	Paris, France	

Legend: # – Record awaiting ratification by French Swimming Federation; WR – World record; ER – European record; e – equalled existing record;
Records not set in finals: h – heat; sf – semifinal; r – relay 1st leg; rh – relay heat 1st leg; b – B final; † – en route to final mark; so – swim-off; tt – time trial

=== Mixed relay ===
Event	Time		Name	Club	Date	Meet	Location	Ref
4×100 m freestyle relay	3:21.35		Maxime Grousset (47.62); Yann le Goff (47.77); Marie Wattel (52.74); Béryl Gastaldello (53.22)	France	2 August 2025	World Championships	Singapore, Singapore	
4×200 m freestyle relay	7:29.25	not ratified	Hadrien Salvan (1:47.63); Wissam-Amazigh Yebba (1:46.53); Charlotte Bonnet (1:56.39); Lucile Tessariol (1:58.70)	France	16 August 2022	European Championships	Rome, Italy	
4×100 m medley relay	3:40.96		Yohann Ndoye-Brouard (52.80); Leon Marchand (58.66); Marie Wattel (56.44); Beryl Gastaldello (53.06)	France	3 August 2024	Olympic Games	Paris, France	
4×100 m medley relay	3:39.64	#	Mary-Ambre Moluh (57.99); Carl Aitkaci (59.05); Maxime Grousset (49.66); Marie Wattel (52.94)	France	11 August 2026	European Championships	Paris, France	

Legend: # – Record awaiting ratification by French Swimming Federation; WR – World record; ER – European record; e – equalled existing record;
Records not set in finals: h – heat; so – swim-off

== Short course (25 m) ==
=== Men ===
Event	Time		Name	Club	Date	Meet	Location	Ref
50m freestyle	20.26		Florent Manaudou	France	5 December 2014	World Championships	Doha, Qatar	
100m freestyle	44.94	ER	Amaury Leveaux	France	13 Dec 2008	European Championships	Rijeka, Croatia	
200m freestyle	1:39.70		Yannick Agnel	Olympic Nice Natation	18 November 2012	French Championships	Angers, France	
400m freestyle	3:32.25	WR	Yannick Agnel	Olympic Nice Natation	15 November 2012	French Championships	Angers, France	
800m freestyle	7:29.17		Yannick Agnel	Olympic Nice Natation	16 November 2012	French Championships	Angers, France	
1500m freestyle	14:19.11		Sacha Velly	FC Laon	1 November 2026	French Championships	Angers, France	
50m backstroke	22.22		Florent Manaudou	France	6 December 2014	World Championships	Doha, Qatar	
100m backstroke	49.46		Mewen Tomac	France	5 December 2025	European Championships	Lublin, Poland	
200m backstroke	1:47.68		Léon Marchand	France	10 October 2025	World Cup	Carmel, United States	
50m breaststroke	26.11		Florent Manaudou	CN Marseille	22 November 2014	French Championships	Montpellier, France	
100m breaststroke	56.78		Giacomo Perez-Dortona	France	4 December 2014	World Championships	Doha, Qatar	
200m breaststroke	2:02.00		Léon Marchand	France	12 October 2025	World Cup	Carmel, United States	
50m butterfly	21.95	sf	Maxime Grousset	France	2 December 2025	European Championships	Lublin, Poland	
100m butterfly	48.10		Maxime Grousset	France	5 December 2025	European Championships	Lublin, Poland	
200m butterfly	1:50.73		Franck Esposito	CN Antibes	8 Dec 2002	Interclubs	Antibes, France	
100m individual medley	49.92	ER	Léon Marchand	France	31 October 2024	World Cup	Singapore, Singapore	
200m individual medley	1:48.88	WR	Léon Marchand	France	1 November 2024	World Cup	Singapore, Singapore	
400m individual medley	3:58.30		Léon Marchand	France	26 October 2024	World Cup	Incheon, South Korea	
4×50m freestyle relay	1:20.77	^{[WB]}, ER	Alain Bernard (20.64); Fabien Gilot (20.33); Amaury Leveaux (19.93); Frédérick Bousquet (19.87)	France	14 Dec 2008	European Championships	Rijeka, Croatia	
4×100m freestyle relay	3:03.78		Clement Mignon (47.05); Fabien Gilot (46.13); Florent Manaudou (44.80); Mehdy Metella (45.80)	France	3 December 2014	World Championships	Doha, Qatar	
10×100m freestyle relay	8:23.90		Julien Sicot (48.99); Frank Schott (49.01); Christophe Marchand (49.55); Lionel Moreau (49.13); Stéphan Perrot (52.58); Sylvain Cros (50.43); Fabrice Beaunoir (52.39); Sébastien Sauvage (51.52); David Maître (50.24); Davy Teinturier (50.06)	CN Marseille	22 Dec 2001	Interclubs	Dunkirk, France	
4×200m freestyle relay	6:53.05		Yannick Agnel (1:41.95); Fabien Gilot (1:42.55); Clément Lefert (1:45.01); Jérémy Stravius (1:43.54)	France	16 December 2010	World Championships	Dubai, United Arab Emirates	
4×50m medley relay	1:30.99		Mewen Tomac (22.98); Jeremie Delbois (26.00); Clément Secchi (22.05); Maxime Grousset (19.96)	France	7 December 2025	European Championships	Lublin, Poland	
4×100m medley relay	3:22.26		Florent Manaudou (50.35); Giacomo Perez-Dortona (57.00); Mehdy Metella (49.07); Clement Mignon (45.84)	France	7 December 2014	World Championships	Doha, Qatar	

Legend: # – Record awaiting ratification by French Swimming Federation; WR – World record; ER – European record; e – equalled existing record;
Records not set in finals: h – heat; sf – semifinal; r – relay 1st leg; rh – relay heat 1st leg; b – B final; † – en route to final mark; so – swim-off; tt – time trial

=== Women ===
Event	Time		Name	Club	Date	Meet	Location	Ref
50m freestyle	23.41		Béryl Gastaldello	France	7 December 2025	European Championships	Lublin, Poland	
100m freestyle	50.60		Béryl Gastaldello	France	6 December 2025	European Championships	Lublin, Poland	
200m freestyle	1:51.65		Camille Muffat	Olympic Nice Natation	18 November 2012	French Championships	Angers, France	
400m freestyle	3:54.85		Camille Muffat	France	24 November 2012	European Championships	Chartres, France	
800m freestyle	8:01.06		Camille Muffat	Olympic Nice Natation	16 November 2012	French Championships	Angers, France	
1500m freestyle	15:20.12		Anastasia Kirpichnikova	France	8 December 2023	European Championships	Otopeni, Romania	
50m backstroke	25.94		Analia Pigrée	France	13 December 2024	World Championships	Budapest, Hungary	
100m backstroke	55.66		Béryl Gastaldello	Montpellier Metropole Natation	31 October 2026	French Championships	Angers, France	
200m backstroke	2:01.67		Alexianne Castel	France	17 December 2010	World Championships	Dubai, United Arab Emirates	
50m breaststroke	29.98		Charlotte Bonnet	Olympic Nice Natation	15 November 2018	French Championships	Montpellier, France	
100m breaststroke	1:05.03		Charlotte Bonnet	Olympic Nice Natation	4 November 2022	French Championships	Chartres, France	
200m breaststroke	2:20.64		Charlotte Bonnet	Olympic Nice Natation	28 October 2023	French Championships	Angers, France	
50m butterfly	24.43		Béryl Gastaldello	France	11 December 2024	World Championships	Budapest, Hungary	
100m butterfly	55.05	sf	Diane Bui Duyet	France	12 Dec 2009	European Championships	Istanbul, Turkey	
200m butterfly	2:03.22		Aurore Mongel	France	10 Dec 2009	European Championships	Istanbul, Turkey	
100m individual medley	56.67		Béryl Gastaldello	France	13 December 2024	World Championships	Budapest, Hungary	
200m individual medley	2:06.58		Charlotte Bonnet	France	9 December 2023	European Championships	Otopeni, Romania	
400m individual medley	4:26.41		Fantine Lesaffre	Energy Standard	23 November 2019	International Swimming League	London, Great Britain	
4×50m freestyle relay	1:35.21		Béryl Gastaldello (23.85); Melanie Henique (23.30); Léna Bousquin (24.40); Anna Santamans (23.66)	France	6 December 2019	European Championships	Glasgow, Great Britain	
4×100m freestyle relay	3:34.84	h	Anna Santamans (53.49); Marie Wattel (53.82); Mathilde Cini (54.47); Melanie Henique (53.06)	France	6 December 2016	World Championships	Windsor, Canada	
10×100m freestyle relay	9:35.36		Magali Monchaux (56.67); Angela Tavernier (56.84); Laetitia Choux (57.19); Solenne Figuès (53.98); Fanny Massanet (1:01.00); Karine Bilski (56.67); Audrey Boitte (59.89); Flora Lamotte (57.67); Aurélie Gresset (57.19); Julie Perez (58.26)	Dauphins; Toulouse OEC	22 Dec 2001	French Interclubs Championships	Dunkirk, France	
4×200m freestyle relay	7:38.33		Camille Muffat (1:53.17); Coralie Balmy (1:53.71); Mylène Lazare (1:56.24); Ophélie Cyrielle Etienne (1:55.21)	France	15 December 2010	World Championships	Dubai, United Arab Emirates	
4×50m medley relay	1:45.35		Mathilde Cini (26.72); Charlotte Bonnet (30.01); Mélanie Henique (24.80); Marie Wattel (23.82)	France	17 December 2017	European Championships	Copenhagen, Denmark	
4×50m medley relay	1:43.96	not ratified	Analia Pigrée (26.30); Charlotte Bonnet (29.64); Mélanie Henique (24.78); Béryl Gastaldello (23.24)	France	17 December 2022	World Championships	Melbourne, Australia	
4×100m medley relay	3:59.87		Laure Manaudou; Andréa Baudry; Diane Bui Duyet; Angéla Tavernier	CN Marseille	29 Dec 2008	Indian Ocean International Meet	Saint-Paul, Réunion, France	
4×100m medley relay	3:50.28	not ratified	Pauline Mahieu (57.22); Charlotte Bonnet (1:04.12); Béryl Gastaldello (56.20); Mary Moluh (52.74)	France	18 December 2022	World Championships	Melbourne, Australia	

Legend: # – Record awaiting ratification by French Swimming Federation; WR – World record; ER – European record; e – equalled existing record;
Records not set in finals: h – heat; sf – semifinal; r – relay 1st leg; rh – relay heat 1st leg; b – B final; † – en route to final mark; so – swim-off; tt – time trial

=== Mixed relay ===
Event	Time		Name	Club	Date	Meet	Location	Ref
4×50m freestyle relay	1:27.33	WR	Maxime Grousset (20.92); Florent Manaudou (20.26); Béryl Gastaldello (23.00); Mélanie Henique (23.15)	France	16 December 2022	World Championships	Melbourne, Australia	
4×50m medley relay	1:37.75		Jérémy Stravius (22.94); Theo Bussiere (26.25); Mélanie Henique (25.39); Charlotte Bonnet (23.17)	France	14 December 2017	European Championships	Copenhagen, Denmark	
4×50m medley relay	1:37.14	#	Mewen Tomac (22.83); Florent Manaudou (25.70); Béryl Gastaldello (24.92); Charlotte Bonnet (23.69)	France	10 December 2023	European Championships	Otopeni, Romania	

Legend: # – Record awaiting ratification by French Swimming Federation; e – equalled existing record;
Records not set in finals: h – heat; so – swim-off
