= Swimming at the 2026 European Aquatics Championships – Women's 50 metre backstroke =

Women's 50 metre backstroke at the 2026 European Aquatics Championships
- Venue: Paris Aquatic Centre
- Dates: 12 August (heats and semifinals); 13 August (final)
- Competitors: 42 from 24 nations
- Winning time: 26.56 WR

Medalists
gold medal	Sara Curtis	Italy
silver medal	Mary-Ambre Moluh	France
bronze medal	Lauren Cox	Great Britain

The Women's 50 metre backstroke competition of the 2026 European Aquatics Championships was held on 12 and 13 August 2026.

== Records ==
Prior to the competition, the existing world, European and championship records were as follows:

	Name	Nation	Time	Location	Date
World record	Kaylee McKeown	Australia	26.86	Budapest	20 October 2023
European record	Kira Toussaint	Netherlands	27.10	Eindhoven	10 April 2021
Championship record	Kathleen Dawson	United Kingdom	27.19	Budapest	18 May 2021

== Results ==
=== Heats ===
The heats were started on 12 August at 10:14.

Rank	Heat	Lane	Swimmer	Nation	Time	Notes
1	5	4	Sara Curtis	Italy	27.31	Q
2	3	4	Mary-Ambre Moluh	France	27.39	Q
3	3	5	Marrit Steenbergen	Netherlands	27.61	Q
3	4	5	Analia Pigree	France	27.61	Q
3	5	5	Alina Gaifutdinova	Neutral Athletes B	27.61	Q
6	5	3	Tessa Giele	Netherlands	27.64	Q
7	4	3	Beryl Gastaldello	France	27.75	Q
8	3	2	Irene Ciércoles	Spain	27.71	Q
9	3	3	Roos Vanotterdijk	Belgium	27.83	Q
10	4	4	Lauren Cox	Great Britain	27.97	Q
11	4	2	Jeanne Lechevalier	France	28.02	
12	3	6	Costanza Cocconcelli	Italy	28.03	Q
13	5	6	Danielle Hill	Ireland	28.08	Q
14	4	6	Maaike de Waard	Netherlands	28.13	
15	3	1	Emilija Pociūtė	Lithuania	28.21	Q, NR
16	5	2	Fanny Teijonsalo	Finland	28.24	Q
17	2	3	Ingeborg Løyning	Norway	28.46	Q
18	4	7	Mariia Osetrova	Neutral Athletes B	28.50	Q
19	3	7	Adela Piskorska	Poland	28.61	Q
19	5	7	Federica Toma	Italy	28.61	
21	3	0	Emma Brogaard Krogh	Denmark	28.68	
22	4	1	Zofia Kowalska-Frączyk	Poland	28.73	
23	5	0	Nika Sharafutdinova	Ukraine	28.75	
24	3	8	Ida Jacobsen	Denmark	28.82	
24	5	1	Varvara Hlushchenko	Poland	28.82	
26	2	2	Tom Mienis	Israel	28.83	
27	4	0	Lottie Cullen	Ireland	28.87	
28	4	8	Angelina Patt	Switzerland	28.92	
29	5	8	Nina Stanisavljević	Serbia	28.96	
30	2	4	Sara Junevik	Sweden	29.07	
31	3	9	Camila Rebelo	Portugal	29.14	
32	5	9	Maari Randvali	Estonia	29.18	
33	4	9	Jinth Engelse	Netherlands	29.33	
34	2	5	Ewa Leciejewska	Poland	29.42	
35	2	8	Aviv Barzelay	Israel	29.56	
36	2	6	Eleni Antoniadou	Greece	29.63	
37	2	1	Gabriela Georgieva	Bulgaria	29.68	
38	1	4	Emmanuela Leu	Moldova	29.71	
39	2	7	Margaret Markvardt	Estonia	29.76	
40	2	0	Jenna Laukkanen	Finland	29.77	
41	1	5	Fia Stenman	Finland	30.58	
42	1	3	Erina Idrizaj	Kosovo	30.82	

=== Semifinals ===
The semifinals were started on 12 August at 19:29.

Rank	Heat	Lane	Swimmer	Nation	Time	Notes
1	2	4	Sara Curtis	Italy	26.63	Q, WR
2	2	3	Alina Gaifutdinova	Neutral Athletes B	26.91	Q, NR
3	1	4	Mary-Ambre Moluh	France	27.25	Q
4	1	3	Tessa Giele	Netherlands	27.30	Q
5	2	5	Marrit Steenbergen	Netherlands	27.31	Q
6	1	5	Analia Pigree	France	27.34	Q
7	2	2	Lauren Cox	Great Britain	27.39	Q
8	2	7	Danielle Hill	Ireland	27.85	Q
9	1	2	Costanza Cocconcelli	Italy	27.87	
10	1	6	Roos Vanotterdijk	Belgium	27.88	
11	2	1	Fanny Teijonsalo	Finland	27.94	
12	2	6	Irene Ciércoles	Spain	28.00	
13	1	7	Emilija Pociūtė	Lithuania	28.08	NR
14	1	1	Ingeborg Løyning	Norway	28.40	
15	2	8	Mariia Osetrova	Neutral Athletes B	28.57	
16	1	8	Adela Piskorska	Poland	28.68	

=== Final ===
The final was held on 13 August at 19:43.

Rank	Lane	Swimmer	Nation	Time	Notes
1st place, gold medalist(s)	4	Sara Curtis	Italy	26.56	WR
2nd place, silver medalist(s)	3	Mary-Ambre Moluh	France	27.06	NR
3rd place, bronze medalist(s)	1	Lauren Cox	Great Britain	27.15	
4	2	Marrit Steenbergen	Netherlands	27.16	
5	5	Alina Gaifutdinova	Neutral Athletes B	27.23	
6	6	Tessa Giele	Netherlands	27.26	
7	7	Analia Pigree	France	27.57	
8	8	Danielle Hill	Ireland	27.91	
