= Swimming at the 2025 World Aquatics Championships – Mixed 4 × 100 metre freestyle relay =

Mixed 4 × 100 metre freestyle relay at the 2025 World Aquatics Championships
- Venue: World Aquatics Championships Arena
- Location: Singapore Sports Hub, Kallang
- Dates: 2 August
- Competitors: 145 from 33 nations
- Teams: 33
- Winning time: 3:18.48

Medalists
gold medal	Jack Alexy; Patrick Sammon; Kate Douglass; Torri Huske; Chris Guiliano; Johny Kulow; Simone Manuel	United States
silver medal	Egor Kornev; Ivan Giryov; Daria Trofimova; Daria Klepikova; Vladislav Grinev; Alina Gaifutdinova; Milana Stepanova
bronze medal	Maxime Grousset; Yann Le Goff; Marie Wattel; Béryl Gastaldello; Rafael Fente-Damers; Albane Cachot	France

The mixed 4 × 100 metre freestyle relay at the 2025 World Aquatics Championships was held on 2 August 2025 at the World Aquatics Championships Arena at the Singapore Sports Hub in Kallang, Singapore.

== Background ==
The United States, Australia, and China were expected to contest for the medals, given their sprint depth. The United States, using Jack Alexy, Patrick Sammon, Torri Huske, and Gretchen Walsh’s recent times, could reach 3:19.85, near their 2019 national record. Australia, who will likely field Kyle Chalmers, Flynn Southam, Mollie O’Callaghan, and Olivia Wunsch, projects around 3:21.21, while China, led by Pan Zhanle, Chen Juner, Wu Qingfeng, and Cheng Yujie, project to 3:22.39. Other possible finalists include Great Britain, Italy, the Neutral Athletes B team, and the Netherlands, though medal prospects depend heavily on relay composition and swimmers’ form earlier in the meet.

== Qualification ==
Each National Federation could enter one team in the relay. The team had to be composed of swimmers who were also competing in the individual events, along with relay only swimmers who had to have met a specific qualifying time for the corresponding stroke and distance they would be swimming in the relay. Federations were only allowed to enter two relay-only swimmers for each relay they entered, though they could also enter relay-only swimmers from other relays which did not count toward this limitation.

== Records ==
Prior to the competition, the existing world and championship records were as follows.

World record	Australia	3:18.83	Fukuoka, Japan	29 July 2023
Competition record	Australia	3:18.83	Fukuoka, Japan	29 July 2023

The following new records were set during this competition.

Date	Event	Nation	Time	Record
2 August	Final	United States	3:18.48	WR

== Heats ==
The heats took place at 11:09.

Rank	Heat	Lane	Nation	Swimmers	Time	Notes
1	2	4	United States	Chris Guiliano (47.66); Johny Kulow (47.68); Simone Manuel (52.67); Kate Douglass (53.47)	3:21.48	Q
2	4	6	France	Rafael Fente-Damers (48.72); Yann Le Goff (48.01); Albane Cachot (53.93); Marie Wattel (53.55)	3:24.21	Q
3	2	2	Netherlands	Renzo Tjon-A-Joe (49.12); Sean Niewold (48.56); Tessa Giele (54.68); Marrit Steenbergen (51.95)	3:24.31	Q
4	2	8	Neutral Athletes B	Vladislav Grinev (48.68); Ivan Giryov (47.77); Alina Gaifutdinova (53.67); Milana Stepanova (54.34)	3:24.46	Q
5	4	2	Spain	Sergio de Celis (48.52); Luca Hoek (47.60); María Daza (54.63); Carmen Weiler (53.73)	3:24.48	Q, NR
6	4	3	Italy	Manuel Frigo (48.47); Lorenzo Zazzeri (48.46); Chiara Tarantino (54.53); Emma Virginia Menicucci (53.38)	3:24.84	Q
7	4	5	Germany	Josha Salchow (48.32); Rafael Miroslaw (48.48); Nina Holt (53.62); Nina Jazy (54.45)	3:24.87	Q, NR
8	2	6	Canada	Ruslan Gaziev (48.69); Antoine Sauve (48.42); Brooklyn Douthwright (54.16); Mary-Sophie Harvey (53.67)	3:24.94	Q
9	4	4	Hungary	Nándor Németh (48.25); Hubert Kós (48.82); Nikolett Pádár (54.42); Lilla Minna Ábrahám (53.47)	3:24.96	NR
10	2	7	China	Chen Juner (48.77); Wang Haoyu (48.10); Yu Yiting (53.72); Yang Wenwen (54.53)	3:25.12	
11	2	3	Australia	Kai Taylor (48.37); Maximillian Giuliani (49.00); Hannah Casey (54.23); Milla Jansen (53.55)	3:25.15	
12	3	5	Great Britain	Jacob Whittle (48.82); Jacob Mills (48.34); Freya Anderson (53.95); Eva Okaro (54.13)	3:25.24	
13	3	3	Sweden	Robin Hanson (48.84); Elias Persson (48.31); Louise Hansson (54.32); Sofia Åstedt (54.04)	3:26.41	
14	1	6	Japan	Tatsuya Murasa (48.92); Taikan Tanaka (48.99); Nagisa Ikemoto (53.86); Mizuki Hirai (55.00)	3:26.77	
15	3	6	Denmark	Frederik Lentz (49.08); Oliver Søgaard-Andersen (48.44); Elisabeth Ebbesen (54.72); Schastine Tabor (55.50)	3:27.74	NR
16	4	0	Mexico	Jorge Iga (49.32); Andrés Dupont (48.06); Miranda Grana (56.27); Celia Pulido (55.31)	3:28.96	
17	3	4	Poland	Kamil Sieradzki (48.49); Karol Ostrowski (49.60); Zuzanna Famulok (55.69); Wiktoria Guść (55.48)	3:29.26	
18	1	2	Greece	Dimitrios Markos (49.33); Konstantinos Stamou (48.84); Artemis Vasilaki (56.91); Nikoletta Pavlopoulou (56.46)	3:31.54	
19	3	2	South Africa	Matthew Sates (50.56); Matthew Caldwell (52.34); Olivia Nel (54.12); Aimee Canny (54.63)	3:31.65	
20	1	7	Iceland	Birnir Freyr Hálfdánarson (51.54); Guðmundur Leo Rafnsson (50.89); Snæfríður Jórunnardóttir (55.19); Jóhanna Elín Guðmundsdóttir (57.03)	3:34.65	NR
21	4	9	Aruba	Mikel Schreuders (49.02); Patrick Groters (51.92); Avigayle Tromp (58.55); Elisabeth Timmer (57.17)	3:36.66	NR
22	4	1	Uganda	Jesse Ssuubi Ssengonzi (51.99); Kirabo Namutebi (1:00.74); Gloria Muzito (55.70); Tendo Mukalazi (52.76)	3:41.19	
23	3	8	Kenya	Stephen Nyoike (53.61); Haniel Kudwoli (54.79); Imara Thorpe (58.36); Sara Mose (56.94)	3:43.70	
24	2	9	Armenia	Levon Kocharyan (53.09); Ashot Chakhoyan (54.31); Varsenik Manucharyan (58.54); Yeva Karapetyan (1:00.84)	3:46.78	
25	3	9	Dominican Republic	Josué Domínguez (53.71); Elizabeth Jiménez (58.73); María Alejandra Fernández (1:02.80); Javier Núñez (51.58)	3:46.82	
26	2	1	Macau	Chao Man Hou (52.33); Lam Chi Chong (54.17); Cheang Weng Chi (1:00.94); Chen Pui Lam (59.97)	3:47.41	
27	2	5	Faroe Islands	Isak Brisenfeldt (51.94); Liggjas Joensen (52.90); Bjarta í Lágabø (1:02.86); Lea Højsted (1:01.18)	3:48.88	NR
28	1	3	Cape Verde	Jose Tati (57.60); Jayla Pina (59.09); Kaila Dacruz (1:04.54); Rohan Shearer (52.47)	3:53.70	NR
29	1	5	Samoa	Paige Schendelaar-Kemp (1:00.51); Johann Stickland (54.09); Kaiya Brown (1:04.39); Kokoro Frost (55.00)	3:53.99	
30	1	4	Northern Mariana Islands	Michael Miller (56.52); Piper Raho (1:02.97); Kouki Cerezo Watanabe (57.08); Maria Batallones (1:04.72)	4:01.29	
31	2	0	Maldives	Amna Thazkiyah Mirsaad (1:05.55); Meral Ayn Latheef (1:05.57); Mohamed Aan Hussain (54.49); Mohamed Rihan Shiham (58.60)	4:04.21	
	4	7	Hong Kong	Hayden Kwan (52.14); Tsui Yik Ki (56.36); Li Sum Yiu; Ng Lai Wa	Disqualified	
	4	8	Papua New Guinea	Josh Tarere (55.30); Nathaniel Noka (57.63); Jhnayali Tokome-Garap; Joanna Chen	Disqualified	
	3	7	Ghana	Did not start		
	3	0	Nigeria	Did not start		
	3	1	Singapore	Did not start		

== Final ==
The final took place on 2 August at 20:42.

Rank	Lane	Nation	Swimmers	Time	Notes
1st place, gold medalist(s)	4	United States	Jack Alexy (46.91); Patrick Sammon (46.70); Kate Douglass (52.43); Torri Huske (52.44)	3:18.48	WR
2nd place, silver medalist(s)	6	Neutral Athletes B	Egor Kornev (47.69); Ivan Giryov (47.08); Daria Trofimova (52.42); Daria Klepikova (52.49)	3:19.68	ER (Note: National record for Russia, through they were representing the Neutral Athletes B team.)
3rd place, bronze medalist(s)	5	France	Maxime Grousset (47.62); Yann Le Goff (47.77); Marie Wattel (52.74); Béryl Gastaldello (53.22)	3:21.35	NR
4	7	Italy	Manuel Frigo (48.18); Carlos D'Ambrosio (47.34); Sara Curtis (52.40); Emma Virginia Menicucci (53.56)	3:21.48	NR
5	3	Netherlands	Sean Niewold (48.60); Renzo Tjon-A-Joe (47.87); Milou van Wijk (53.06); Marrit Steenbergen (52.18)	3:21.71	NR
6	8	Canada	Ruslan Gaziev (48.43); Josh Liendo (47.64); Mary-Sophie Harvey (53.46); Taylor Ruck (53.63)	3:23.16	
7	2	Spain	Sergio de Celis (48.72); Luca Hoek (47.67); Carmen Weiler (53.82); María Daza (54.66)	3:24.87	
8	1	Germany	Josha Salchow (48.49); Rafael Miroslaw (48.25 ) Nina Holt (53.87); Nina Jazy (54.68)	3:25.29	
