= Swimming at the 2026 European Aquatics Championships – Mixed 4 × 100 metre freestyle relay =

Mixed 4 × 100 metre freestyle relay at the 2026 European Aquatics Championships
- Venue: Paris Aquatic Centre
- Dates: 14 August
- Competitors: 65 from 13 nations
- Teams: 13
- Winning time: 3:19.95 CR

Medalists
| gold medal | Egor Kornev; Ivan Giryov; Daria Klepikova; Kira Manokhina; Roman Zhidkov; Vasilii Kukushkin; Dariia Surushkina; Kseniia Sorokina |
| silver medal | Sean Niewold; Merlin Belmon; Milou van Wijk; Marrit Steenbergen; Brandon van den Berg; Yara van Kalmthout; Imani de Jong | Netherlands |
| bronze medal | Carlos D'Ambrosio; Thomas Ceccon; Sara Curtis; Emma Virginia Menicucci; Manuel Frigo; Alessandra Mao | Italy |

The Mixed 4 × 100 metre freestyle relay competition of the 2026 European Aquatics Championships was held on 14 August 2026.

== Records ==
Prior to the competition, the existing European and championship records were as follows.

| | Team | Time | Location | Date |
|---|---|---|---|---|
| World record | United States | 3:18.48 | Singapore | 2 August 2025 |
| European record | Neutral Athletes B | 3:19.68 | Singapore | 2 August 2025 |
| Championship record | France | 3:22.07 | Glasgow | 8 August 2018 |
| Championship record | Great Britain | 3:22.07 | Budapest | 22 May 2021 |

== Results ==
=== Heats ===
The heats were started at 10:47.

| Rank | Heat | Lane | Nation | Swimmers | Time | Notes |
|---|---|---|---|---|---|---|
| 1 | 1 | 6 | Czechia | Jakub Jan Krischke (49.25); Miroslav Knedla (48.46); Barbora Janíčková (53.01); Barbora Seemanová (52.69) | 3:23.41 | Q, NR |
| 2 | 2 | 4 | Netherlands | Sean Niewold (48.13); Brandon van den Berg (48.73); Yara van Kalmthout (53.49); Imani de Jong (53.59) | 3:23.94 | Q |
| 3 | 2 | 5 | Italy | Carlos D'Ambrosio (48.01); Manuel Frigo (48.07); Emma Virginia Menicucci (53.86); Alessandra Mao (54.02) | 3:23.96 | Q |
| 4 | 1 | 5 | Neutral Athletes B | Roman Zhidkov (48.28); Vasilii Kukushkin (47.46); Dariia Surushkina (54.25); Kseniia Sorokina (54.36) | 3:24.35 | Q |
| 5 | 2 | 7 | Great Britain | Alexander Cohoon (48.44); Gabriel Shepherd (48.48); Evelyn Davis (53.92); Theodora Taylor (53.66) | 3:24.50 | Q |
| 6 | 2 | 2 | Sweden | Robin Hanson (49.50); Ludvig Bartolek (48.45); Sara Junevik (54.04); Sofia Åstedt (53.59) | 3:25.58 | Q |
| 7 | 1 | 2 | France | Nans Mazellier (49.04); Cédric Gabali (48.27); Albane Cachot (53.83); Giulia Rossi-Bene (54.63) | 3:25.77 | Q |
| 8 | 1 | 1 | Spain | Miguel Pérez-Godoy (49.12); Luca Hoek (47.77); María Daza (53.92); Ainhoa Campabadal (55.22) | 3:26.03 | Q |
| 9 | 2 | 1 | Germany | Josha Salchow (48.80); Julian Koch (49.07); Nicole Maier (54.47); Nina Holt (54.02) | 3:26.36 | |
| 10 | 2 | 6 | Switzerland | Mattia Mauri (49.21); Balint Ashton (48.38); Julia Ullmann (55.92); Manon Richard (56.77) | 3:30.28 | |
| 11 | 1 | 4 | Norway | Sander Kiær Sørensen (49.49); Elias Nordeng Refstie (49.38); Hedda Oritsland (55.76); Sandra Maria Balto (57.17) | 3:31.80 | NR |
| 12 | 2 | 3 | Poland | Szymon Mróz (50.63); Paweł Uryniuk (50.22); Flawia Kamzol (56.85); Aleksandra Knop (57.24) | 3:34.94 | |
| 13 | 1 | 7 | Armenia | Gevorg Tonoyan (53.89); Ashot Chakhoyan (54.01); Varsenik Manucharyan (58.33); Milania Gunko (1:00.88) | 3:47.11 | |
| | 1 | 3 | Lithuania | | Did not start | |

=== Final ===
The final was held at 20:16.

| Rank | Lane | Nation | Swimmers | Time | Notes |
|---|---|---|---|---|---|
| 1st place, gold medalist(s) | 6 | Neutral Athletes B | Egor Kornev (47.05); Ivan Giryov (47.67); Daria Klepikova (52.21); Kira Manokhina (53.02) | 3:19.95 | CR |
| 2nd place, silver medalist(s) | 5 | Netherlands | Sean Niewold (47.95); Merlin Belmon (48.55); Milou van Wijk (52.85); Marrit Steenbergen (50.74) | 3:20.09 | NR |
| 3rd place, bronze medalist(s) | 3 | Italy | Carlos D'Ambrosio (47.86); Thomas Ceccon (47.56); Sara Curtis (51.79); Emma Virginia Menicucci (53.59) | 3:20.80 | NR |
| 4 | 8 | Spain | Luca Hoek (47.56); Miguel Pérez-Godoy (47.81); María Daza (53.50); Irene Ciércoles (54.04) | 3:22.91 | NR |
| 5 | 4 | Czechia | Jakub Jan Krischke (49.39); Miroslav Knedla (48.21); Barbora Janíčková (53.06); Barbora Seemanová (52.55) | 3:23.21 | NR |
| 6 | 2 | Great Britain | Alexander Cohoon (48.29); Matthew Richards (47.41); Theodora Taylor (53.75); Evelyn Davis (53.98) | 3:23.43 | |
| 7 | 7 | Sweden | Robin Hanson (48.76); Ludvig Bartolek (48.07); Sara Junevik (53.93); Sofia Åstedt (53.44) | 3:24.20 | |
| | 1 | France | Maxime Grousset; Cédric Gabali; Albane Cachot; Marie Wattel | Disqualified | |
