= 2022 FINA World Swimming Championships (25 m) – Women's 100 metre individual medley =

Swimming competition

Women's 100 metre individual medley at the 2022 FINA World Swimming Championships (25 m)
- Venue: Melbourne Sports and Aquatic Centre
- Location: Melbourne, Australia
- Dates: 15 December (heats and semifinals); 16 December (final)
- Competitors: 30 from 28 nations
- Winning time: 57.53

Medalists
| gold medal | Marrit Steenbergen | Netherlands |
| silver medal | Béryl Gastaldello | France |
| bronze medal | Louise Hansson | Sweden |

The Women's 100 metre individual medley competition of the 2022 FINA World Swimming Championships (25 m) was held on 15 and 16 December 2022.

== Records ==
Prior to the competition, the existing world and championship records were as follows.

| World record | Katinka Hosszú (HUN) | 56.51 | Berlin, Germany | 7 August 2017 |
| Competition record | Katinka Hosszú (HUN) | 56.70 | Doha, Qatar | 5 December 2014 |

== Results ==
=== Heats ===
The heats were started on 15 December at 12:02.

| Rank | Heat | Lane | Name | Nationality | Time | Notes |
|---|---|---|---|---|---|---|
| 1 | 3 | 4 | Louise Hansson | Sweden | 57.98 | Q |
| 2 | 2 | 4 | Marrit Steenbergen | Netherlands | 58.87 | Q |
| 3 | 4 | 3 | Helena Gasson | New Zealand | 58.92 | Q |
| 4 | 4 | 5 | Mary-Sophie Harvey | Canada | 58.93 | Q |
| 5 | 4 | 4 | Béryl Gastaldello | France | 59.19 | Q |
| 5 | 2 | 5 | Costanza Cocconcelli | Italy | 59.19 | Q |
| 7 | 2 | 3 | Lena Kreundl | Austria | 59.29 | Q |
| 8 | 2 | 6 | Rebecca Meder | South Africa | 59.38 | Q, AF |
| 9 | 3 | 1 | Neža Klančar | Slovenia | 59.42 | Q, NR |
| 10 | 3 | 3 | Yui Ohashi | Japan | 59.49 | Q |
| 10 | 3 | 5 | Sydney Pickrem | Canada | 59.49 | Q |
| 12 | 4 | 6 | Emelie Fast | Sweden | 59.53 | Q |
| 13 | 2 | 2 | Tamara Potocká | Slovakia | 59.69 | Q, NR |
| 14 | 3 | 2 | África Zamorano | Spain | 59.99 | Q, NR |
| 15 | 3 | 6 | Diana Petkova | Bulgaria | 1:00.08 | Q |
| 16 | 2 | 7 | Kayla Hardy | Australia | 1:00.16 | Q |
| 17 | 3 | 7 | McKenna DeBever | Peru | 1:00.48 | NR |
| 18 | 4 | 7 | Stefanía Gómez | Colombia | 1:01.27 | |
| 19 | 2 | 1 | Maria Romanjuk | Estonia | 1:01.32 | |
| 20 | 4 | 1 | Stephanie Balduccini | Brazil | 1:01.58 | |
| 21 | 1 | 4 | Kristen Romano | Puerto Rico | 1:01.76 | NR |
| 22 | 4 | 8 | Chloe Isleta | Philippines | 1:02.11 | |
| 23 | 1 | 7 | Chang Yujuan | Hong Kong | 1:02.64 | |
| 24 | 1 | 1 | Jayla Pina | Cape Verde | 1:05.18 | |
| 25 | 3 | 8 | Arina Baikova | Latvia | 1:05.22 | |
| 26 | 2 | 8 | Kirsten Fisher-Marsters | Cook Islands | 1:07.40 | |
| 27 | 1 | 3 | Mia Lee | Guam | 1:10.55 | |
| 28 | 1 | 2 | Jennifer Harding-Marlin | Saint Kitts and Nevis | 1:13.46 | |
| 29 | 1 | 6 | Kestra Kihleng | Federated States of Micronesia | 1:14.77 | |
| 30 | 1 | 5 | Galyah Mikel | Palau | 1:22.45 | |
| | 4 | 2 | Kristýna Horská | Czech Republic | Did not start | |

=== Semifinals ===
The semifinals were started on 15 December at 20:57.

| Rank | Heat | Lane | Name | Nationality | Time | Notes |
|---|---|---|---|---|---|---|
| 1 | 1 | 4 | Marrit Steenbergen | Netherlands | 57.65 | Q |
| 2 | 2 | 4 | Louise Hansson | Sweden | 58.05 | Q |
| 3 | 2 | 7 | Sydney Pickrem | Canada | 58.54 | Q |
| 4 | 1 | 3 | Béryl Gastaldello | France | 58.61 | Q |
| 5 | 1 | 6 | Rebecca Meder | South Africa | 58.98 | Q, AF |
| 6 | 2 | 6 | Lena Kreundl | Austria | 59.04 | Q, NR |
| 7 | 1 | 5 | Mary-Sophie Harvey | Canada | 59.13 | Q |
| 8 | 2 | 5 | Helena Gasson | New Zealand | 59.15 | Q |
| 9 | 2 | 2 | Neža Klančar | Slovenia | 59.27 | NR |
| 10 | 2 | 3 | Costanza Cocconcelli | Italy | 59.34 | |
| 11 | 1 | 2 | Yui Ohashi | Japan | 59.45 | |
| 11 | 2 | 8 | Diana Petkova | Bulgaria | 59.45 | |
| 13 | 2 | 1 | Tamara Potocká | Slovakia | 59.55 | NR |
| 14 | 1 | 7 | Emelie Fast | Sweden | 59.61 | |
| 15 | 1 | 8 | Kayla Hardy | Australia | 59.75 | |
| | 1 | 1 | África Zamorano | Spain | Disqualified | |

=== Final ===
The final was held on 16 December at 20:56.

| Rank | Lane | Name | Nationality | Time | Notes |
|---|---|---|---|---|---|
| 1st place, gold medalist(s) | 4 | Marrit Steenbergen | Netherlands | 57.53 | NR |
| 2nd place, silver medalist(s) | 6 | Béryl Gastaldello | France | 57.63 | |
| 3rd place, bronze medalist(s) | 5 | Louise Hansson | Sweden | 57.68 | |
| 4 | 3 | Sydney Pickrem | Canada | 58.26 | |
| 5 | 8 | Helena Gasson | New Zealand | 58.40 | NR |
| 6 | 2 | Rebecca Meder | South Africa | 58.46 | AF |
| 7 | 7 | Lena Kreundl | Austria | 58.79 | NR |
| 8 | 1 | Mary-Sophie Harvey | Canada | 59.11 | |
