= 2024 World Aquatics Swimming Championships (25 m) – Women's 50 metre butterfly =

Swimming competition

Women's 50 metre butterfly at the 2024 World Aquatics Swimming Championships (25 m)
- Venue: Duna Arena
- Location: Budapest, Hungary
- Dates: 10 December (heats and semifinals); 11 December (final)
- Competitors: 56
- Winning time: 24.01

Medalists
gold medal	Gretchen Walsh	United States
silver medal	Béryl Gastaldello	France
bronze medal	Alexandria Perkins	Australia

The women's 50 metre butterfly event at the 2024 World Aquatics Swimming Championships (25 m) was held from 10 to 11 December 2024 at the Duna Arena in Budapest, Hungary.

== Records ==
Prior to the competition, the existing world and championship records were as follows.

World record	Therese Alshammar (SWE)	24.38	Singapore	22 November 2009
Competition record	Ranomi Kromowidjojo (NED)	24.44	Abu Dhabi, United Arab Emirates	19 December 2021

The following new records were set during this competition:

Date	Event	Name	Nationality	Time	Record
10 December	Semifinal 2	Gretchen Walsh	United States	23.94	WR

== Results ==
=== Heats ===
The heats were started on 10 December at 10:11.

Rank	Heat	Lane	Name	Nationality	Time	Notes
1	5	3	Gretchen Walsh	United States	24.02	Q, WR
2	4	4	Arina Surkova	Neutral Athletes B	24.78	Q
3	5	5	Tessa Giele	Netherlands	25.01	Q
4	5	4	Alexandria Perkins	Australia	25.04	Q
5	4	5	Sara Junevik	Sweden	25.13	Q
6	5	6	Silvia Di Pietro	Italy	25.16	Q
7	6	6	Maaike de Waard	Netherlands	25.33	Q
8	6	4	Béryl Gastaldello	France	25.36	Q
9	4	2	Helena Gasson	New Zealand	25.39	Q
10	6	5	Lily Price	Australia	25.40	Q
11	4	7	Laura Lahtinen	Finland	25.47	Q, NR
12	4	3	Mélanie Henique	France	25.52	Q
13	6	3	Mizuki Hirai	Japan	25.59	Q
14	4	1	Ellen Walshe	Ireland	25.65	Q, NR
15	5	2	Daryna Nabojčenko	Czech Republic	25.68	Q
16	6	1	Jenjira Srisa-Ard	Thailand	25.72	Q, NR
17	6	7	Jessica Thompson	South Africa	25.73	R
18	6	2	Elena Capretta	Italy	25.81	R
19	4	9	Eva Okaro	United Kingdom	25.83	
19	5	7	Chen Luying	China	25.83	
21	6	9	Lora Komoróczy	Hungary	25.85	
22	4	0	Tam Hoi Lam	Hong Kong	25.98	NR
23	5	1	Hedda Øritsland	Norway	26.01	
24	4	6	Hazel Ouwehand	New Zealand	26.04	
25	5	0	Anastasiya Kuliashova	Neutral Athletes A	26.06	
25	5	9	Sofia Spodarenko	Kazakhstan	26.06	NR
27	6	0	Paulina Peda	Poland	26.19	
28	5	8	Lillian Slusna	Slovakia	26.23	
29	3	7	Ingrid Wilm	Canada	26.36	
30	3	4	Kalia Antoniou	Cyprus	26.44	NR
31	6	8	Jeong Soeun	South Korea	26.46	
32	3	8	Smilte Plytnykaite	Lithuania	26.74	
33	3	3	Nicholle Toh	Singapore	26.79	
34	3	6	Jessica Calderbank	Jamaica	26.97	
35	3	5	Mariangela Boitšuk	Estonia	27.09	
36	3	0	Paige Schendelaar-Kemp	Samoa	27.20	
37	2	4	M.V. Schutzmeier	Nicaragua	27.24	
38	3	2	J.E. Gudmundsdottir	Iceland	27.30	
39	3	9	I.B.P. Thorpe	Kenya	27.54	NR
40	3	1	Amel Melih	Algeria	27.57	
41	2	3	Elizaveta Pecherskikh	Kyrgyzstan	27.80	
42	1	6	Kim Sol Song	North Korea	27.82	
43	2	7	Aleka Persaud	Guyana	28.34	
44	1	5	Timipame-Ere Akiayefa	Nigeria	28.35	
45	2	2	Victoria Russell	Bahamas	28.72	
46	2	6	Kyra Dalilah De Cuba	Curaçao	28.86	
47	2	5	Lia Lima	Angola	28.88	
48	2	1	Jhnayali Tokome-Garap	Papua New Guinea	28.95	NR
49	2	0	Meral Ayn Latheef	Maldives	31.88	
50	1	3	Mona Alfarsi	Kuwait	33.08	
51	2	8	Tayamika Changanamuno	Malawi	33.91	
52	1	7	K.M.T. Ibrahim	Comoros	35.02	
53	2	9	Lina Alemayehu Selo	Ethiopia	35.84	
54	1	4	Leena Mohamedahmed	Sudan	35.94	NR
55	1	2	Hazel Alamy	Sierra Leone	45.09	
	4	8	Jana Pavalić	Croatia	Disqualified	

=== Semifinals ===
The semifinals were started on 10 December at 17:43.

Rank	Heat	Lane	Name	Nationality	Time	Notes
1	2	4	Gretchen Walsh	United States	23.94	Q, WR
2	1	6	Béryl Gastaldello	France	24.67	Q
3	2	5	Tessa Giele	Netherlands	24.68	Q
4	1	4	Arina Surkova	Neutral Athletes B	24.71	Q
5	2	6	Maaike de Waard	Netherlands	24.76	Q
6	1	5	Alexandria Perkins	Australia	24.89	Q
7	1	7	Mélanie Henique	France	24.93	Q
8	1	2	Lily Price	Australia	25.13	QSO
8	1	3	Silvia Di Pietro	Italy	25.13	QSO
10	2	3	Sara Junevik	Sweden	25.14	R
11	2	2	Helena Gasson	New Zealand	25.24	NR
12	1	8	Jenjira Srisa-Ard	Thailand	25.26	NR
13	2	1	Mizuki Hirai	Japan	25.27	
14	1	1	Ellen Walshe	Ireland	25.45	NR
15	2	7	Laura Lahtinen	Finland	25.59	
16	2	8	Daryna Nabojčenko	Czech Republic	25.78	

=== Swim-off ===
The swim-off was held on 10 December at 19:47.

Rank	Lane	Name	Nationality	Time	Notes
1	4	Lily Price	Australia	25.07	Q
2	5	Silvia Di Pietro	Italy	25.26	

=== Final ===
The final was held on 11 December at 18:35.

Rank	Lane	Name	Nationality	Time	Notes
1st place, gold medalist(s)	4	Gretchen Walsh	United States	24.01	
2nd place, silver medalist(s)	5	Béryl Gastaldello	France	24.43	NR
3rd place, bronze medalist(s)	7	Alexandria Perkins	Australia	24.68	OC
4	6	Arina Surkova	Neutral Athletes B	24.84	
5	3	Tessa Giele	Netherlands	24.87	
6	1	Mélanie Henique	France	24.89	
7	2	Maaike de Waard	Netherlands	24.98	
8	8	Lily Price	Australia	25.06	
