= Swimming at the 2026 European Aquatics Championships – Women's 100 metre backstroke =

Women's 100 metre backstroke at the 2026 European Aquatics Championships
- Venue: Paris Aquatic Centre
- Dates: 14 August(heats and semifinals); 15 August (final)
- Competitors: 40
- Winning time: 57.94

Medalists
gold medal	Mary-Ambre Moluh	France
silver medal	Marrit Steenbergen	Netherlands
bronze medal	Pauline Mahieu	France

The Women's 100 metre backstroke competition of the 2026 European Aquatics Championships was held on 14 and 15 August 2026.

== Records ==
Prior to the competition, the existing world, European and championship records were as follows.

	Name	Nationality	Time	Location	Date
World record	Regan Smith	United States	57.13	Indianapolis	18 June 2026
European record	Kathleen Dawson	Great Britain	58.08	Budapest	23 May 2021
Championship record	Kathleen Dawson	Great Britain	58.08	Budapest	23 May 2021

== Results ==
=== Heats ===
The heats began on 14 August at 09:51.
Qualification Rules: The 16 fastest from the heats qualify to the semifinals.

Rank	Heat	Lane	Swimmer	Country	Time	Notes
=1	4	4	Marrit Steenbergen	Netherlands	59.66	Q
=1	5	4	Mary-Ambre Moluh	France	59.66	Q
3	3	4	Pauline Mahieu	France	1:00.25	Q
4	3	3	Irene Ciercoles Galve	Spain	1:00.38	Q
5	4	6	Camila Rodrigues Rebelo	Portugal	1:00.43	Q
6	4	2	Federica Toma	Italy	1:00.56	
=7	5	2	Katie Shanahan	Great Britain	1:00.62	Q
=7	5	5	Maaike de Waard	Netherlands	1:00.62	Q
9	3	5	Alina Gaifutdinova	Neutral Athletes B	1:00.63	Q
10	4	7	Lise Seidel	Germany	1:00.72	Q
11	4	5	Lauren Cox	Great Britain	1:00.73	Q
12	5	7	E.L. Tonrath Nolgen	Spain	1:00.85	Q
13	3	7	Sara Costa de Vicente	Spain	1:01.03	0
14	5	1	Danielle Hill	Ireland	1:01.12	Q
15	3	2	Grace Davison	Ireland	1:01.14	Q
16	2	5	Emma Brogaard Krogh	Denmark	1:01.16	Q
17	3	6	Lottie Cullen	Ireland	1:01.17	0
18	2	2	Tom Mienis	Israel	1:01.19	Q
19	3	1	Schastine Tabor	Denmark	1:01.20	R
20	4	3	Adela Krystyna Piskorska	Poland	1:01.64	
21	3	8	Nika Sharafutdinova	Ukraine	1:01.68	
22	4	1	Fanni Viktoria Kokas	Hungary	1:01.71	
23	4	0	Emilija Pociute	Lithuania	1:01.73	
24	5	9	Aviv Barzelay	Israel	1:02.00	
25	3	9	Maari Randvali	Estonia	1:02.13	
26	3	0	Gabriela Georgieva	Bulgaria	1:02.25	
27	5	6	Anastasiya Shkurdai	Neutral Athletes A	1:02.37	
28	2	4	Iris Julia Berger	Austria	1:02.58	
29	2	1	Gaia Rasmussen	Switzerland	1:02.67	
30	4	9	Eleni Antoniadou	Greece	1:02.73	
31	2	3	Fanny Teijonsalo	Finland	1:02.77	
32	2	6	Ana Nizharadze	Georgia	1:03.37	
33	5	0	Ewa Maria Leciejewska	Poland	1:03.43	
34	2	8	Manon Richard	Switzerland	1:03.56	
35	5	8	Varvara Hlushchenko	Poland	1:03.62	
36	1	4	Margaret Markvardt	Estonia	1:03.73	
37	1	5	Ida Jacobsen	Denmark	1:04.33	
38	2	7	Z.A. Kowalska-Fraczyk	Poland	1:05.14	
39	1	3	Erina Idrizaj	Kosovo	1:07.57	
-	4	8	Costanza Cocconcelli	Italy	DNS	

=== Semifinals ===
The semifinal were started on 14 August at 18:50.
Qualification Rules: The first 2 competitors of each semifinal and the remaining fastest (up to a total of 8 qualified competitors) from the semifinals advance to the final.

Rank	Heat	Lane	Swimmer	Country	Time	Notes
1	2	4	Mary-Ambre Moluh	France	58.21	Q, NR
2	2	5	Pauline Mahieu	France	58.93	Q
3	2	2	Alina Gaifutdinova	Neutral Athletes B	59.15	Q
4	1	4	Marrit Steenbergen	Netherlands	59.70	Q
5	1	6	Katie Shanahan	Great Britain	59.71	Q
6	2	7	Lauren Cox	Great Britain	59.74	Q
7	1	5	Irene Ciercoles Galve	Spain	59.77	Q
8	2	3	Camila Rodrigues Rebelo	Portugal	59.90	Q, NR
9	2	6	Maaike de Waard	Netherlands	59.96	R
10	1	3	Federica Toma	Italy	1:00.50	R
11	1	2	Lise Seidel	Germany	1:00.75	
12	1	8	Tom Mienis	Israel	1:00.91	
13	2	8	Emma Brogaard Krogh	Denmark	1:00.97	
14	1	7	E.L. Tonrath Nollgen	Spain	1:01.31	
15	1	1	Grace Davison	Ireland	1:01.56	
16	2	1	Danielle Hill	Ireland	1:01.67	

=== Final ===
The final will be held on 15 August at 20:07.

Rank	Lane	Name	Nationality	Time	Notes
1st place, gold medalist(s)	4	Mary-Ambre Moluh	France	57.94	ER, CR
2nd place, silver medalist(s)	6	Marrit Steenbergen	Netherlands	58.46	
3rd place, bronze medalist(s)	5	Pauline Mahieu	France	58.77	
4	3	Alina Gaifutdinova	Neutral Athletes B	59.53	
5	1	Irene Ciercoles Galve	Spain	59.65	
6	7	Lauren Cox	United Kingdom	59.71	
7	2	Katie Shanahan	United Kingdom	59.83	
8	8	Camila Rodrigues Rebelo	Portugal	1:00.10	
