= Lucas Henveaux =

Belgian swimmer (born 2000)

Personal information
- National team: Belgium
- Born: 25 September 2000 (age 25) Liège, Belgium
- Height: 1.94 m (6 ft 4 in)

Sport
- Sport: Swimming
- Strokes: Freestyle
- Club: Liège Natation
- Coach: André Henveaux
Medal record
Men's swimming
Representing Belgium
World Championships (SC)
Bronze medal – third place	2024 Budapest	200 m freestyle
European Championships (SC)
Silver medal – second place	2025 Lublin	800 m freestyle
Bronze medal – third place	2023 Otopeni	400 m freestyle

Lucas Henveaux (born 25 September 2000), is a Belgian competitive swimmer who specializes in freestyle events.

He is the son of André Henveaux and Els Gitsels. His father is a swimming coach at Liege Natation, a club he founded on May 12, 1987. His younger sister, Camille Henveaux, is also a swimmer.

He won the bronze medal in the 400 meter freestyle at the 2023 European Short Course Swimming Championships in Otopeni, Romania. In 2023 also, he qualified for the 400 m freestyle at the 2024 Summer Olympics in Paris, France.
