= Swimming at the 2026 European Aquatics Championships – Mixed 4 × 100 metre medley relay =

Mixed 4 × 100 metre medley relay at the 2026 European Aquatics Championships
- Venue: Paris Aquatic Centre
- Dates: 11 August (heats and final)
- Competitors: 98 from 21 nations
- Teams: 21
- Winning time: 3:39.64

Medalists
| gold medal | Mary-Ambre Moluh; Carl Aitkaci; Maxime Grousset; Marie Wattel; Amaury Albar; Albane Cachot | France |
| silver medal | Maaike de Waard; Caspar Corbeau; Sean Niewold; Marrit Steenbergen; Koen de Groet; Tessa Giele | Netherlands |
| bronze medal | Kliment Kolesnikov; Kirill Prigoda; Daria Klepikova; Alexandra Kuznetsova; Pavel Samusenko; Ivan Kozhakin; Arina Surkova; Alina Gaifutdinova |

The Mixed 4 × 100 metre medley relay competition of the 2026 European Aquatics Championships was held on 11 August 2026.

== Records ==
Prior to the competition, the existing European and championship records were as follows.

| | Team | Time | Location | Date |
|---|---|---|---|---|
| World record | United States | 3:37.43 | Paris | 3 August 2024 |
| European record | Great Britain | 3:37.58 | Tokyo | 31 July 2021 |
| Championship record | Great Britain | 3:38.82 | Budapest | 20 May 2021 |

== Results ==
=== Heats ===
The heats were started at 10:23.
Qualification Rules: The 8 fastest from the heats qualify to the final.

| Rank | Heat | Lane | Nation | Swimmers | Time | Notes |
|---|---|---|---|---|---|---|
| 1 | 3 | 1 | Neutral Athletes B | Pavel Samusenko (53.01); Ivan Kozhakin (58.85); Arina Surkova (57.71); Alina Gaifutdinova (53.45) | 3:43.02 | Q |
| 2 | 3 | 6 | France | Mary-Ambre Moluh (59.09); Carl Aitkaci (59.42); Amaury Albar (51.87); Albane Cachot (53.89) | 3:44.27 | Q |
| 3 | 2 | 3 | Great Britain | Oliver Morgan (53.45); Gregory Butler (59.87); Keanna Macinnes (58.02); Evelyn Davis (54.35) | 3:45.69 | Q |
| 4 | 2 | 2 | Spain | Iván Martínez (53.78); Nil Cadevall (59.71); Laura Cabanes (58.78); Irene Ciércoles (53.60) | 3:45.87 | Q, NR |
| 5 | 3 | 8 | Greece | Apostolos Christou (52.51); Evangelos Ntoumas (59.85); Anna Ntountounaki (58.35); Anna Vlachou (55.19) | 3:45.90 | Q |
| 6 | 3 | 5 | Poland | Ksawery Masiuk (52.94); Jan Kałusowski (59.47); Zuzanna Famulok (58.84); Barbara Leśniewska (54.98) | 3:46.23 | Q |
| 7 | 2 | 0 | Netherlands | Maaike de Waard (1:00.33); Koen de Groet (59.64); Tessa Giele (58.62); Sean Niewold (48.09) | 3:46.68 | Q |
| 8 | 2 | 8 | Germany | Ole Braunschweig (54.84); Lucas Matzerath (59.43); Yara Fay Riefstahl (59.45); Linda Roth (53.80) | 3:47.52 | Q |
| 9 | 2 | 7 | Denmark | Robert Pedersen (53.99); Elias Elsgaard (1:00.47); Helena Rosendahl Bach (58.06); Julie Kepp Jensen (55.20) | 3:47.72 | NR |
| 10 | 3 | 7 | Sweden | Vidar Carlbaum (55.52); Oliver Munn (1:00.84); Louise Hansson (57.71); Sofia Åstedt (54.23) | 3:48.30 | |
| 11 | 3 | 4 | Ireland | Lottie Cullen (1:02.30); Darragh Greene (59.75); Jack Cassin (51.91); Grace Davison (54.38) | 3:48.34 | NR |
| 12 | 1 | 4 | Norway | Ingeborg Løyning (1:00.52); Charlie Egeland (1:00.47); Elias Klev (52.66); Hedda Øritsland (55.80) | 3:49.45 | NR |
| 13 | 3 | 2 | Lithuania | Mantas Kaušpėdas (55.91); Kotryna Teterevkova (1:06.02); Kristupas Trepočka (52.80); Sylvia Statkevičius (55.39) | 3:50.12 | NR |
| 14 | 2 | 1 | Neutral Athletes A | Artsiom Yarmak (54.30); Ilya Shymanovich (58.70); Anastasiya Kuliashova (58.91); Anastasiya Shkurdai (58.25) | 3:50.16 | |
| 15 | 2 | 6 | Ukraine | Nika Sharafutdinova (1:02.29); Yana Klikotska (1:09.70); Ihor Troianovskyi (51.46); Illia Linnyk (48.75) | 3:52.20 | |
| 16 | 3 | 0 | Switzerland | Gaia Rasmussen (1:02.22); Gian-Luca Gartmann (1:01.41); Julia Ullmann (59.80); Antonio Djakovic (49.83) | 3:53.26 | |
| 17 | 1 | 5 | Armenia | Gevorg Tonoyan (1:00.04); Ashot Chakhoyan (1:03.71); Varsenik Manucharyan (1:00.78); Milania Gunko (1:00.27) | 4:04.80 | |
| 18 | 2 | 4 | Moldova | Emmanuela Leu (1:04.72); Denis Svet (1:04.48); Maria Corlateanu (1:09.63); Constantin Malachi (52.40) | 4:11.23 | |
| | 1 | 3 | Estonia | Maari Randvali (1:01.49); Egle Salu (1:09.96); Alex Ahtiainen; Lars Kuljus | DSQ | |
| | 2 | 5 | Italy | Michele Lamberti (54.32); Ludovico Viberti; Anita Gastaldi; Emma Virginia Menicucci | DSQ | |
| | 3 | 3 | Georgia | Noe Pantskhava; Anna Sofia Kalandadze; Ana Nizharadze; Andrea Poladashvili | DSQ | |

=== Final ===
The final was held at 20:06.

| Rank | Lane | Nation | Swimmers | Time | Notes |
|---|---|---|---|---|---|
| 1st place, gold medalist(s) | 5 | France | Mary-Ambre Moluh (57.99) ER; Carl Aitkaci (59.05); Maxime Grousset (49.66); Marie Wattel (52.94) | 3:39.64 | |
| 2nd place, silver medalist(s) | 1 | Netherlands | Maaike de Waard (59.89); Caspar Corbeau (59.03); Sean Niewold (51.13); Marrit Steenbergen (50.87) | 3:40.92 | NR |
| 3rd place, bronze medalist(s) | 4 | Neutral Athletes B | Kliment Kolesnikov (52.45); Kirill Prigoda (58.24); Daria Klepikova (57.38); Alexandra Kuznetsova (53.45) | 3:41.52 | |
| 4 | 3 | Great Britain | Oliver Morgan (52.87); Adam Ramsay-Peaty (58.94); Keanna Macinnes (56.47); Freya Anderson (53.43) | 3:41.71 | |
| 5 | 8 | Germany | Kaii Winkler (53.64); Melvin Imoudu (59.12); Angelina Köhler (56.55); Nina Holt (53.69) | 3:43.00 | NR |
| 6 | 6 | Spain | Iván Martínez (53.32); Nil Cadevall (59.87); Laura Cabanes (58.56); Irene Ciércoles (53.35) | 3:45.10 | NR |
| 7 | 2 | Greece | Apostolos Christou (52.51); Evangelos Ntoumas (1:00.02); Anna Ntountounaki (56.47); Anna Vlachou (56.17) | 3:45.17 | |
| 8 | 7 | Poland | Ksawery Masiuk (53.13); Jan Kałusowski (1:00.13); Zuzanna Famulok (58.95); Barbara Leśniewska (54.16) | 3:46.37 | |
