= Sean Niewold =

Dutch swimmer

Personal information
- Nationality: Dutch
- Born: April 20, 2002 (age 24) Groningen, Netherlands
- Height: 2.02 m (6 ft 8 in)

Sport
- Sport: Swimming
- Strokes: Freestyle, Butterfly
- Club: Feijenoord Albion
- College team: Alabama Crimson Tide
Medal record
Men's swimming
Representing the Netherlands
European Championships (LC)
Silver medal – second place	2026 Paris	4×100 m mixed medley
Silver medal – second place	2026 Paris	4x100 m mixed freestyle

Sean Niewold (born 20 April 2002) is a Dutch swimmer who competed at the 2024 Olympics in the 100 meter freestyle, where he placed 23rd.

== Early life ==
Sean Niewold was born in Groningen, the Netherlands. He moved abroad with his family two weeks after his birth because of his father's job in the oil industry. He spent most of his childhood in Azerbaijan, Libya, the United Arab Emirates and Saudi Arabia. Growing up in countries with warm climates, he swam regularly at school (Jumeriah English Speaking School Arabian Ranches in the UAE) and began competitive swimming in Libya, where swimming and football were among the main sports. Because his family relocated frequently, he found it difficult to build lasting friendships, although he later said the experience helped him adapt easily to new environments and cultures.

During the Libyan Civil War in 2011, Niewold and his family experienced the violence firsthand. He later recalled bombs falling near their home and sheltering with dozens of other people. Niewold and his mother escaped Libya by boat from Tripoli to Malta during severe weather, while his father remained behind to help evacuate other employees before safely leaving the country himself. Niewold has said these experiences contributed to his ability to remain calm under pressure. He has a tattoo of the Kazakh phrase Allaga Amanat ("Trust in God"), reflecting a saying often used by his mother, who is originally from Kazakhstan.

== Swimmer ==
After returning to the Netherlands in 2017, Niewold began training under coach Shilo Dormehl. He later trained with WVZ in Zoetermeer before joining the High Performance Centre in Amsterdam in 2022 as part of the Dutch national programme. In 2023 he left the national training centre after losing his place in the programme and joined Feijenoord Albion in Rotterdam, where he trained alongside his partner, Tessa Giele. Both qualified for the 2024 Summer Olympics in Paris while representing the Rotterdam club.

At the 2024 Summer Olympics in Paris, Niewold finished 23rd in the 100 metre freestyle. Following the Games, he reduced his training volume in order to complete a bachelor's degree in mechanical engineering at Delft University of Technology. He has stated that balancing elite sport and his studies became more difficult because he no longer held an A-status within the Dutch high-performance programme, making full-time training financially challenging.

In July 2025, shortly before competing at the 2025 World Aquatics Championships in Singapore, Niewold obtained his Dutch swimming certificate (Zwemdiploma A), already an Olympian and national champion. Having grown up outside the Netherlands, he had never completed the Dutch swimming diploma system as a child. He explained that he had previously earned only the Dutch C diploma while temporarily living in Groningen after he evacuated from Libya.

During the 2025 European Short Course Swimming Championships in Lublin, Poland, Niewold won the silver medal in the mixed 4 × 50 metre medley relay as part of the Dutch team alongside Caspar Corbeau, Maaike de Waard and Marrit Steenbergen. He also won bronze in the mixed 4 × 50 metre freestyle relay. Giele won two relay gold medals and an individual silver medal there. The couple were living and training together in Rotterdam at the time, where they represented Feijenoord Albion and trained at Zwemcentrum Rotterdam.

In 2026, Niewold and Giele relocated to Tuscaloosa, Alabama, where they joined the University of Alabama swimming programme while continuing their international careers. Niewold described the scale of collegiate swimming in the United States as markedly different from that in the Netherlands, noting facilities such as charter flights to competitions and the extensive support available to student-athletes.
