= French Swimming Federation =

Sports governing body in France

French Swimming Federation Fédération Française de Natation
- Sport: swimming, diving, synchronized swimming, water polo, open water swimming
- Abbreviation: (FFN)
- Founded: 1919
- Affiliation: World Aquatics (formerly FINA); European Aquatics (formerly LEN)
- Location: Paris, France
- President: Gilles Sezionale, since 2017

Official website
- www.ffnatation.fr

The French Swimming Federation (French: Fédération française de natation, FFN) is the French water sports association. Founded in February 1919, it grouped the sports swimming clubs, open water swimming, synchronized swimming, diving and French water polo, which organizes the national competitions and the selection of French teams. In 2017, the Federation had 316,905 members. The FFN is a member of the European Aquatics and the World Aquatics. Since April 2017, the FFN is chaired by Gilles Sezionale.

== Affiliation ==
It is affiliated to:

- FINA, which oversees international swimming;
- LEN, which oversees swimming in Europe;
- CNOSF, the French National Olympic and Sport Committee; and
- the French Government's Secretary of State for Sport.

Among other responsibilities, FFN is charged with:

- fielding French teams to international aquatics competitions (such as the Olympics),
- maintaining the French Records for swimming,
- organizing French Championships in aquatics.

It has its headquarters in Pantin.

== Historical ==
After thirty years of hegemony on amateur sport, the strict vision of amateurism and the omnisports character of the UFSA no longer respond to developments in sport. The idea of the sport federation was in the air, but the status quo is privileged: the board of the USFSA Swimming Commission is still the governing body. This is how the FFN will become a "pretext" federation in order to evoke certain points that are considered essential, even urgent, for some French swimming officials. From the constituent meeting of February 8, 1919 an office is created. Maurice Joffrin is the active president, Mrs de la Meillale president. Émile Pasquignon Loubet, an industrialist in Oloron-Sainte-Marie, a sports patron, is named honorary president. Martha Bogaerts and Ms. Vannereau are vice-presidents, but Mr. Mainguet is the real vice-president. The posts of Treasurer and Secretary General are respectively assigned to Captain Louis Degraine and Mr. R. Saladin. The delegate for propaganda is: Marcel Delarbre. Among the members, Mrs Saladin. In 1921, the swimming commission of the former UFSA creates the French Federation of swimming and rescue; she competes with several other swimming associations. In 1938, she became the French Swimming Federation and agreed with the French Rescue and First Aid Federation to be the only leading body for amateur swimming in France.

== Organisation ==
- President: Francis Luyce
- Treasurer: Jean-Paul Vidor

== Principal organized competitions ==
- French swimming championships : take place every year since 1899 concerning the long course pool (50 m LCM) with a period during which they took place twice a year (Winter and Summer championships from 1961 to 1996).

Since 2004, it exists a short course pool edition (25 m SCM) which takes place every year in December.

- French swimming interclub championships : swimming competition where are competing clubs recognized by the French Swimming Federation. The organization of this competition takes place at the regional level with a national ranking. To be classified, a club must compete in the region.

The French Interclub Championships are traditionally held in November but are awarded the titles of the following year. Thus, the 2016 French Interclub Championships are held in November of the previous year (2015).

- French Open Water Swimming Cup : The French Open Water Swimming Cup is a circuit composed of stages organized between February and September under the control of the French Swimming Federation (FFN) and listed on the national calendar.
- Water Polo championship : French men's water polo championship since 1896 and women's since 1983. Since the 2013-2014 season, the Water Polo Promotional League has been organizing these two competitions as well as the Men's and Women's League Cup.
- 25m SCM European Championships
- French N1 and N2 synchronized swimming championships
