= 2025 European Short Course Swimming Championships =

23rd edition of the European Short Course Swimming Championships

- Host city: Lublin, Poland
- Date: 2–7 December 2025
- Venue: Aqua Lublin
- Nations: 44
- Athletes: 500+ (expected)
- Events: 42

The 2025 European Short Course Swimming Championships (25 m) also known as Lublin 2025 was held from 2 to 7 December 2025 at the Aqua Lublin complex in Lublin, Poland. This was the 23rd edition of the biennial competition organized by European Aquatics, contested in a 25-metre pool.

== Background ==
The event marked the first European Aquatics Championship in Poland since 2011, when Szczecin hosted the 15th edition. Aqua Lublin, one of Poland’s most modern aquatic facilities, was selected as the venue, featuring a 50-metre Olympic pool with a movable bottom and advanced timing systems.

More than 500 athletes from across Europe were expected to compete from 44 nations. Russian and Belarusian swimmers will not participate, due to ongoing restrictions on their involvement in European Aquatics events.

== Competition highlights ==
The Championships featured the return of the 4×50m relays, contested in freestyle and medley formats for men, women, and mixed teams. Daniel Wiffen sought to defend his triple crown in distance freestyle, having set a world record in the 800m at the 2023 edition. Noe Ponti aimed to reclaim his 100m butterfly world record, with Grousset providing fierce rivalry. Kasia Wasick of Poland carried home hopes in the women’s 50m freestyle. Italy named a 32-strong squad, including Olympic champions Thomas Ceccon and Nicolo Martinenghi. Germany entered 18 swimmers, led by Lukas Maertens, world record holder in the 400m freestyle. Great Britain confirmed a 17-member team featuring Duncan Scott, Matt Richards, and Freya Anderson, while Ireland sent 12 athletes, spearheaded by Daniel Wiffen, defending champion in the 400m, 800m, and 1500m freestyle.

== Broadcasting ==
The Championships were broadcast live across Europe via Eurovision Sport, with free streaming provided by European Aquatics and national federations such as British Swimming.

== Medal table ==
Final Standings

* Host nation (Poland)

Rank	Nation	Gold	Silver	Bronze	Total
1	Italy	9	5	6	20
2	Netherlands	7	4	2	13
3	Great Britain	3	4	4	11
4	Germany	3	2	4	9
5	Ireland	3	1	3	7
6	Spain	3	1	2	6
7	Switzerland	3	1	0	4
8	Estonia	3	0	0	3
9	France	2	8	3	13
10	Poland*	2	2	4	8
11	Denmark	2	1	0	3
12	Hungary	1	4	1	6
13	Croatia	1	1	1	3
14	Belgium	0	4	1	5
15	Turkey	0	2	1	3
16	Czech Republic	0	1	1	2
16	Lithuania	0	1	1	2
16	Sweden	0	1	1	2
19	Ukraine	0	1	0	1
20	Austria	0	0	3	3
20	Israel	0	0	3	3
Totals (21 entries)		42	44	41	127

== Results ==
=== Men's events ===
Event	Gold		Silver		Bronze	
50 m freestyle	Jere Hribar; Croatia	20.70 =NR	Maxime Grousset; France Nikita Sheremet; Ukraine	20.81 20.81 NR	not awarded	
100 m freestyle	Maxime Grousset; France	45.17	Jere Hribar; Croatia	45.64 NR	Matthew Richards; Great Britain	45.82 NR
200 m freestyle	Duncan Scott; Great Britain	1:40.54	Jack McMillan; Great Britain	1:40.94	Evan Bailey; Ireland Kamil Sieradzki; Poland	1:41.48 NR 1:41.48 NR
400 m freestyle	Jack McMillan; Great Britain	3:36.33	Lukas Märtens; Germany	3:36.51	Daniel Wiffen; Ireland	3:37.02
800 m freestyle	Zalán Sárkány; Hungary	7:26.84 NR	Lucas Henveaux; Belgium	7:28.03 NR	Daniel Wiffen; Ireland	7:30.14
1500 m freestyle	Daniel Wiffen; Ireland	14:13.96	Zalán Sárkány; Hungary	14:15.51 NR	Florian Wellbrock; Germany	14.19.26
50 m backstroke	Ralf Tribuntsov; Estonia	22.68	Miroslav Knedla; Czech Republic	22.69 NR	Francesco Lazzari; Italy	22.76
100 m backstroke	Thomas Ceccon; Italy	49.29	Mewen Tomac; France	49.46 NR	Oliver Morgan; Great Britain	49.68
200 m backstroke	John Shortt; Ireland	1:47.89; WJ, CR, NR	Mewen Tomac; France	1:48.62	Jan Cejka; Czech Republic	1:49.43 NR
50 m breaststroke	Simone Cerasuolo; Italy	25.67	Emre Sakçı; Turkey	25.85	Nicolò Martinenghi; Italy	25.86
100 m breaststroke	Caspar Corbeau; Netherlands	55.85	Emre Sakçı; Turkey	56.22	Luka Mladenovic; Austria	56.27 NR
200 m breaststroke	Carles Coll; Spain	2:00.86 NR	Caspar Corbeau; Netherlands	2:01.27	Luka Mladenovic; Austria	2:02.48 NR
50 m butterfly	Noe Ponti; Switzerland	21.54	Szebasztián Szabó; Hungary	21.89	Maxime Grousset; France	21.99
100 m butterfly	Maxime Grousset; France	48.10; CR, NR	Noè Ponti; Switzerland	48.11	Michele Busa; Italy	49.21
200 m butterfly	Noe Ponti; Switzerland	1:50.17	Krzysztof Chmielewski; Poland	1:50.24	Michał Chmielewski; Poland	1:50.30
100 m individual medley	Noe Ponti; Switzerland	50.52 CR	Maxime Grousset; France	50.53	Heiko Gigler; Austria	51.60
200 m individual medley	Hugo González; Spain	1:51.39 NR	Alberto Razzetti; Italy	1:52.05	Berke Saka; Turkey	1:52.25 NR
400 m individual medley	Alberto Razzetti; Italy	3:58.79	Max Litchfield; Great Britain	4:03.25	Cedric Büssing; Germany	4:03.51
4 × 50 m freestyle relay	Italy; Leonardo Deplano (20.88); Lorenzo Zazzeri (20.56); Giovanni Guatti (20.67); Thomas Ceccon (20.79); Carlos D'Ambrosio; Manuel Frigo	1:22.90 =NR	Poland; Piotr Ludwiczak (21.30); Ksawery Masiuk (20.62); Kamil Sieradzki (20.71); Mateusz Chowaniec (21.00)	1:23.63 NR	Croatia; Jere Hribar (20.70) =NR; Nikola Miljenic (21.05); Božo Puhalović (21.25); Luka Cvetko (20.79)	1:23.79
4 × 50 m medley relay	Italy; Francesco Lazzari (23.05); Simone Cerasuolo (25.42); Simone Stefanì (21.52); Leonardo Deplano (20.50); Lorenzo Mora; Ludovico Viberti; Michele Busa; Lorenzo Zazzeri	1:30.49	France; Mewen Tomac (22.98); Jérémie Delbois (26.00); Clement Secchi (22.05); Maxime Grousset (19.96); Lucien Vergnes; Yohann Ndoye-Brouard	1:30.99 NR	Spain; Iván Martínez Sota (23.31); Carles Coll (25.65); Hugo González (22.60); Sergio de Celis (20.28); Eudald Tarrats Vilaro	1:31.84 NR

=== Women's events ===
Event	Gold		Silver		Bronze	
50 m freestyle	Katarzyna Wasick; Poland	23.20	Beryl Gastaldello; France Sara Curtis; Italy	23.41 NR 23.41	not awarded	
100 m freestyle	Marrit Steenbergen; Netherlands	50.42; CR, ER	Beryl Gastaldello; France	50.60 NR	Sara Curtis; Italy	51.26 NR
200 m freestyle	Marrit Steenbergen; Netherlands	1:50.33; CR, ER	Minna Ábrahám; Hungary	1:51.47	Freya Colbert; Great Britain	1:51.94
400 m freestyle	Isabel Gose; Germany	3:54.33; CR, ER	Simona Quadarella; Italy	3:56.70 NR	Freya Colbert; Great Britain	3:56.71
800 m freestyle	Isabel Gose; Germany	8:01.90; CR, NR	Simona Quadarella; Italy	8:03.00 NR	Maya Werner; Germany	8:14.41
1500 m freestyle	Simona Quadarella; Italy	15:29.93	Maya Werner; Germany	15:47.00	Ajna Késely; Hungary	15:51.73
50 m backstroke	Sara Curtis; Italy	25.49; CR, ER	Analia Pigrée; France	25.96	Maaike de Waard; Netherlands	25.97
100 m backstroke	Lauren Cox; Great Britain	56.51	Maaike de Waard; Netherlands	56.62	Nina Jane Holt; Germany	56.72
200 m backstroke	Carmen Weiler Sastre; Spain	2:01:66 NR	Katie Shanahan; Great Britain	2:02.79	Pauline Mahieu; France	2:03.02
50 m breaststroke	Eneli Jefimova; Estonia	28.81; CR, NR	Rūta Meilutytė; Lithuania	29.22	Florine Gaspard; Belgium	29.34
100 m breaststroke	Eneli Jefimova; Estonia	1:02.82; CR, NR	Florine Gaspard; Belgium	1:03.73	Anastasia Gorbenko; Israel	1:03.90 NR
200 m breaststroke	Anna Elendt; Germany	2:18.16	Angharad Evans; Great Britain	2:18.90	Kotryna Teterevkova; Lithuania	2:19.30 NR
50 m butterfly	Martine Damborg; Denmark	24.61 NR	Roos Vanotterdijk; Belgium	24.84 NR	Beryl Gastaldello; France	24.93
100 m butterfly	Martine Damborg; Denmark	55.52; EJ	Tessa Giele; Netherlands	55.55	Louise Hansson; Sweden	55.69
200 m butterfly	Ellen Walshe; Ireland	2:03.24	Helena Rosendahl Bach; Denmark	2:03.55 NR	Anita Gastaldi; Italy	2:04.07 NR
100 m individual medley	Marrit Steenbergen; Netherlands	56.26; CR, ER	Roos Vanotterdijk; Belgium	56.80 NR	Anastasia Gorbenko; Israel	57.17 NR
200 m individual medley	Marrit Steenbergen; Netherlands	2:01.83; CR, ER	Ellen Walshe; Ireland	2:04.78	Anastasia Gorbenko; Israel	2:05.32
400 m individual medley	Justina Kozan; Poland	4:28.56 NR	Alba Vázquez; Spain	4:29.57	Emma Carrasco; Spain	4:31.27
4 × 50 m freestyle relay	Netherlands; Milou van Wijk (24.08); Marrit Steenbergen (22.89); Tessa Giele (23.83); Valerie van Roon (23.05); Maaike de Waard; Britta Koehorst	1:33.85	Italy; Silvia di Pietro (23.39) NR; Sara Curtis (22.90); Agata Maria Ambler (23.73); Costanza Cocconcelli (24.28); Alessandra Mao	1:34.30 NR	Poland; Katarzyna Wasick (23.57); Kornelia Fiedkiewicz (23.70); Julia Maik (24.04); Barbara Lesniewska (24.44)	1:35.75 NR
4 × 50 m medley relay	Netherlands; Marrit Steenbergen (25.47) CR, ER; Tessa Giele (29.76); Maaike De Waard (24.42); Valerie van Roon (23.18)	1:42.83	Sweden; Hanna Rosvall (26.40); Sophie Hansson (29.31); Sara Junevik (24.52); Louise Hansson (23.56)	1:43.79	Italy; Costanza Cocconcelli (26.74); Irene Burato (29.63); Silvia di Pietro (24.67); Sara Curtis (23.29)	1:44.33

=== Mixed events ===
Event	Gold		Silver		Bronze	
4 × 50 m freestyle relay	Italy; Leonardo Deplano; Lorenzo Zazzeri; Silvia Di Pietro; Sara Curtis; Giovanni Guatti; Agata Ambler	1:27.26; WR	Hungary; Szebasztián Szabó; Ádám Jászó; Petra Senánszky; Minna Ábrahám; Nándor Németh; Panna Ugrai	1:28.04 NR	Netherlands; Brandon van den Berg; Sean Niewold; Marrit Steenbergen; Valerie van Roon; Kenzo Simons; Tessa Giele; Milou van Wijk	1:28.42
4 × 50 m medley relay	Italy; Francesco Lazzari; Simone Cerasuolo; Silvia di Pietro; Sara Curtis; Ludovico Blu Art Viberti; Costanza Cocconcelli; Agata Ambler	1:36.09; CR	Netherlands; Maaike de Waard; Jason van den Berg; Sean Niewold; Valerie van Roon; Marrit Steenbergen	1:36.18 =NR	Poland; Aleksander Styś; Jan Kalusowski; Kornelia Fiedkiewicz; Julia Maik; Katarzyna Wasick	1:36.98 NR
