= List of European records in swimming =

Europe

The European records in swimming are the fastest times ever swum by a swimmer representing a member federation of the European Aquatics (formerly known as LEN), Europe's governing body of swimming.

Records can be set in long course (50 metres) or short course (25 metres) swimming pools, with records currently recorded in the following events for both men and women.

- Freestyle: 50 m, 100 m, 200 m, 400 m, 800 m, 1500 m
- Backstroke: 50 m, 100 m, 200 m
- Breaststroke: 50 m, 100 m, 200 m
- Butterfly: 50 m, 100 m, 200 m
- Individual medley: 100 m (short course only), 200 m, 400 m
- Relays: 4×50 m freestyle (short course only), 4 × 100 m freestyle, 4 × 200 m freestyle, 4×50 m medley (short course only), 4 × 100 m medley

The ratification process and involves submission of an application by the national federation to European Aquatics detailing the name(s) of the swimmer, time swum, date and location of the swim, names of officials and the swimsuit model worn. Upon ratification, the records appear on the official records listing. Records marked with a hash (#) are currently awaiting ratification by European Aquatics or have been obtained since the last version of the official lists. All records were achieved in finals unless otherwise specified.

== Long course (50 m) ==
=== Men ===
| Event | Time | | Name | Nationality | Date | Meet | Location | Ref |
|---|---|---|---|---|---|---|---|---|
| 50 m freestyle | 20.94 | | Frédérick Bousquet | France | 26 April 2009 | French Championships | Montpellier, France | (video) |
| 100 m freestyle | 46.51 | | David Popovici | Romania | 31 July 2025 | World Championships | Singapore, Singapore | |
| 200 m freestyle | 1:42.00 | WR | Paul Biedermann | Germany | 28 July 2009 | World Championships | Rome, Italy | (video) |
| 400 m freestyle | 3:39.96 | WR | Lukas Märtens | Germany | 12 April 2025 | Swim Open Stockholm | Stockholm, Sweden | |
| 800 m freestyle | 7:37.94 | | Johannes Liebmann | Germany | 12 April 2026 | Swim Open Stockholm | Stockholm, Sweden | |
| 800 m freestyle | 7:37.59 | # | Johannes Liebmann | Germany | 12 August 2026 | European Championships | Paris, France | |
| 1500 m freestyle | 14:26.79 | WR | Johannes Liebmann | Germany | 15 August 2026 | European Championships | Paris, France | |
| 50 m backstroke | 23.55 | sf, WR | Kliment Kolesnikov | Russia | 27 July 2023 | Russian Cup | Kazan, Russia | |
| 100 m backstroke | 51.60 | WR | Thomas Ceccon | Italy | 20 June 2022 | World Championships | Budapest, Hungary | |
| 200m backstroke | 1:53.19 | | Hubert Kós | Hungary | 1 August 2025 | World Championships | Singapore, Singapore | |
| 200m backstroke | 1:52.30 | sf, # | Hubert Kós | Hungary | 11 August 2026 | European Championships | Paris, France | |
| 50m breaststroke | 25.95 | sf, WR | Adam Peaty | Great Britain | 25 July 2017 | World Championships | Budapest, Hungary | |
| 100m breaststroke | 56.88 | sf, WR | Adam Peaty | Great Britain | 21 July 2019 | World Championships | Gwangju, South Korea | |
| 200m breaststroke | 2:05.85 | | Léon Marchand | France | 31 July 2024 | Olympic Games | Paris, France | |
| 50m butterfly | 22.27 | WR | Andriy Govorov | Ukraine | 1 July 2018 | Sette Colli Trophy | Rome, Italy | |
| 100m butterfly | 49.62 | | Maxime Grousset | France | 2 August 2025 | World Championships | Singapore, Singapore | |
| 100m butterfly | 49.48 | # | Kristóf Milák | Hungary | 13 August 2026 | European Championships | Paris, France | |
| 200m butterfly | 1:50.34 | WR | Kristóf Milák | Hungary | 21 June 2022 | World Championships | Budapest, Hungary | |
| 200m individual medley | 1:52.69 | sf, WR | Léon Marchand | France | 30 July 2025 | World Championships | Singapore, Singapore | |
| 400m individual medley | 4:02.50 | WR | Léon Marchand | France | 23 July 2023 | World Championships | Fukuoka, Japan | |
| 4×100m freestyle relay | 3:08.32 | | Amaury Leveaux (47.91); Fabien Gilot (47.05); Frédérick Bousquet (46.63); Alain Bernard (46.73) | France | 11 August 2008 | Olympic Games | Beijing, China | |
| 4×200m freestyle relay | 6:58.58 | | Tom Dean (1:45.72); James Guy (1:44.40); Matthew Richards (1:45.01); Duncan Scott (1:43.45) | Great Britain | 28 July 2021 | Olympic Games | Tokyo, Japan | |
| 4×100m medley relay | 3:26.93 | | Miron Lifintsev (52.44); Kirill Prigoda (57.92); Andrei Minakov (50.17); Egor Kornev (46.40) | Russia | 3 August 2025 | World Championships | Singapore, Singapore | |

Legend: # – Record awaiting ratification by European Aquatics; WR – World record; e – equalled existing record;
Records not set in finals: h – heat; sf – semifinal; r – relay 1st leg; rh – relay heat 1st leg; b – B final; † – en route to final mark; so – swim-off; tt – time trial

=== Women ===
| Event | Time | | Name | Nationality | Date | Meet | Location | Ref |
|---|---|---|---|---|---|---|---|---|
| 50m freestyle | 23.61 | sf | Sarah Sjöström | Sweden | 29 July 2023 | World Championships | Fukuoka, Japan | |
| 100m freestyle | 51.68 | WR | Marrit Steenbergen | Netherlands | 27 June 2026 | Sette Colli Trophy | Rome, Italy | |
| 200m freestyle | 1:52.98 | | Federica Pellegrini | Italy | 29 July 2009 | World Championships | Rome, Italy | |
| 400m freestyle | 3:59.15 | | Federica Pellegrini | Italy | 26 July 2009 | World Championships | Rome, Italy | |
| 800m freestyle | 8:12.81 | | Simona Quadarella | Italy | 2 August 2025 | World Championships | Singapore, Singapore | |
| 1500m freestyle | 15:31.79 | | Simona Quadarella | Italy | 29 July 2025 | World Championships | Singapore, Singapore | |
| 50m backstroke | 26.56 | WR | Sara Curtis | Italy | 13 August 2026 | European Championships | Paris, France | |
| 100m backstroke | 58.08 | r | Kathleen Dawson | Great Britain | 23 May 2021 | European Championships | Budapest, Hungary | |
| 100m backstroke | 57.94 | # | Mary-Ambre Moluh | France | 15 August 2026 | European Championships | Paris, France | |
| 200m backstroke | 2:04.94 | | Anastasia Zuyeva | Russia | 1 August 2009 | World Championships | Rome, Italy | |
| 50m breaststroke | 29.16 | WR | Rūta Meilutytė | Lithuania | 30 July 2023 | World Championships | Fukuoka, Japan | |
| 100m breaststroke | 1:04.35 | sf | Rūta Meilutytė | Lithuania | 29 July 2013 | World Championships | Barcelona, Spain | |
| 200m breaststroke | 2:17.55 | WR | Evgeniia Chikunova | Russia | 21 April 2023 | Russian Championships | Kazan, Russia | |
| 50m butterfly | 24.43 | WR | Sarah Sjöström | Sweden | 5 July 2014 | Swedish Championships | Borås, Sweden | |
| 100m butterfly | 55.48 | | Sarah Sjöström | Sweden | 7 August 2016 | Olympic Games | Rio de Janeiro, Brazil | |
| 200m butterfly | 2:04.27 | sf | Katinka Hosszú | Hungary | 29 July 2009 | World Championships | Rome, Italy | |
| 200m individual medley | 2:06.12 | | Katinka Hosszú | Hungary | 3 August 2015 | World Championships | Kazan, Russia | |
| 400m individual medley | 4:26.36 | | Katinka Hosszú | Hungary | 6 August 2016 | Olympic Games | Rio de Janeiro, Brazil | |
| 4×100m freestyle relay | 3:31.72 | | Inge Dekker (53.61); Ranomi Kromowidjojo (52.30); Femke Heemskerk (53.03); Marleen Veldhuis (52.78) | Netherlands | 26 July 2009 | World Championships | Rome, Italy | |
| 4×200m freestyle relay | 7:45.51 | | Joanne Jackson (1:55.98); Jazmin Carlin (1:56.78); Caitlin McClatchey (1:56.42); Rebecca Adlington (1:56.33) | Great Britain | 30 July 2009 | World Championships | Rome, Italy | |
| 4×100m medley relay | 3:53.38 | | Anastasia Fesikova (58.96); Yuliya Efimova (1:04.03); Svetlana Chimrova (56.99); Veronika Popova (53.40) | Russia | 30 July 2017 | World Championships | Budapest, Hungary | |

Legend: # – Record awaiting ratification by European Aquatics; WR – World record; e – equalled existing record;
Records not set in finals: h – heat; sf – semifinal; r – relay 1st leg; rh – relay heat 1st leg; b – B final; † – en route to final mark; so – swim-off; tt – time trial

=== Mixed relay ===
| Event | Time | | Name | Nationality | Date | Meet | Location | Ref |
|---|---|---|---|---|---|---|---|---|
| 4×100 m freestyle relay | 3:19.68 | | Egor Kornev (47.69); Ivan Girev (47.08); Daria Trofimova (52.42); Daria Klepikova (52.49) | Russia | 2 August 2025 | World Championships | Singapore, Singapore | |
| 4×200 m freestyle relay | 7:22.33 | standard | | | | | | |
| 4×100 m medley relay | 3:37.58 | | Kathleen Dawson (58.80); Adam Peaty (56.78); James Guy (50.00); Anna Hopkin (52.00) | Great Britain | 31 July 2021 | Olympic Games | Tokyo, Japan | |

Legend: # – Record awaiting ratification by European Aquatics; WR – World record; e – equalled existing record;
Records not set in finals: h – heat; so – swim-off

== Short course (25 m) ==
=== Men ===
| Event | Time | | Name | Nationality | Date | Meet | Location | Ref |
|---|---|---|---|---|---|---|---|---|
| 50m freestyle | 20.18 | | Benjamin Proud | Great Britain | 7 December 2023 | European Championships | Otopeni, Romania | |
| 100m freestyle | 44.94 | | Amaury Leveaux | France | 13 December 2008 | European Championships | Rijeka, Croatia | |
| 100m freestyle | 44.84 | =WR, # | Egor Kornev | Russia | 2 October 2026 | World Cup | Baku, Azerbaijan | |
| 200m freestyle | 1:39.37 | | Paul Biedermann | Germany | 15 November 2009 | World Cup | Berlin, Germany | |
| 400m freestyle | 3:32.25 | WR | Yannick Agnel | France | 15 November 2012 | French Nationals | Angers, France | |
| 800m freestyle | 7:20.46 | WR | Daniel Wiffen | Ireland | 10 December 2023 | European Championships | Otopeni, Romania | |
| 1500m freestyle | 14:06.88 | WR | Florian Wellbrock | Germany | 21 December 2021 | World Championships | Abu Dhabi, United Arab Emirates | |
| 50m backstroke | 22.11 | WR | Kliment Kolesnikov | Russia | 23 November 2022 | Solidarity Games | Kazan, Russia | |
| 100m backstroke | 48.58 | r | Kliment Kolesnikov | Russia | 21 November 2020 | International Swimming League | Budapest, Hungary | |
| 100m backstroke | 48.16 | WR, # | Hubert Kós | Hungary | 25 October 2025 | World Cup | Toronto, Canada | |
| 200m backstroke | 1:46.11 | | Arkady Vyatchanin | Russia | 15 November 2009 | World Cup | Berlin, Germany | |
| 200m backstroke | 1:45.12 | WR, # | Hubert Kós | Hungary | 23 October 2025 | World Cup | Toronto, Canada | |
| 50m breaststroke | 24.95 | WR | Emre Sakçı | Turkey | 27 December 2021 | Turkish Championships | Gaziantep, Turkey | |
| 100m breaststroke | 55.28 | WR | Ilya Shymanovich | Belarus | 26 November 2021 | International Swimming League | Eindhoven, Netherlands | |
| 200m breaststroke | 2:00.16 | | Kirill Prigoda | Russia | 13 December 2018 | World Championships | Hangzhou, China | |
| 200m breaststroke | 1:59.52 | WR, # | Caspar Corbeau | Netherlands | 25 October 2025 | World Cup | Toronto, Canada | |
| 50m butterfly | 21.32 | WR | Noè Ponti | Switzerland | 11 December 2024 | World Championships | Budapest, Hungary | |
| 50m butterfly | 21.28 | WR, # | Egor Kornev | Russia | 10 October 2026 | World Cup | Tashkent, Uzbekistan | |
| 100m butterfly | 47.71 | | Noè Ponti | Switzerland | 14 December 2024 | World Championships | Budapest, Hungary | |
| 200m butterfly | 1:48.64 | | Alberto Razzetti | Italy | 12 December 2024 | World Championships | Budapest, Hungary | |
| 200m butterfly | 1:48.56 | # | Noè Ponti | Switzerland | 14 November 2026 | Swiss Championships | Prilly, Switzerland | |
| 100m individual medley | 49.92 | | Léon Marchand | France | 31 October 2024 | World Cup | Singapore, Singapore | |
| 200m individual medley | 1:48.88 | WR | Léon Marchand | France | 1 November 2024 | World Cup | Singapore, Singapore | |
| 400m individual medley | 3:56.47 | | Ilya Borodin | Russia | 20 December 2021 | World Championships | Abu Dhabi, United Arab Emirates | |
| 4×50m freestyle relay | 1:20.77 | ^{[WB]} | Alain Bernard (20.64); Fabien Gilot (20.33); Amaury Leveaux (19.93); Frédérick Bousquet (19.87) | France | 14 December 2008 | European Championships | Rijeka, Croatia | |
| 4×100m freestyle relay | 3:02.75 | | Alessandro Miressi (46.15); Paolo Conte Bonin (45.93); Leonardo Deplano (45.54); Thomas Ceccon (45.13) | Italy | 13 December 2022 | World Championships | Melbourne, Australia | |
| 4×200m freestyle relay | 6:46.84 | | Martin Malyutin (1:42.34); Mikhail Vekovishchev (1:41.57); Ivan Girev (1:41.85); Aleksandr Krasnykh (1:41.08) | Russia | 14 December 2018 | World Championships | Hangzhou, China | |
| 4×50m medley relay | 1:29.72 | WR | Lorenzo Mora (22.65); Nicolò Martinenghi (24.95); Matteo Rivolta (21.60); Leonardo Deplano (20.52) | Italy | 17 December 2022 | World Championships | Melbourne, Australia | |
| 4×100m medley relay | 3:19.06 | | Lorenzo Mora (49.48); Nicolò Martinenghi (55.52); Matteo Rivolta (48.50); Alessandro Miressi (45.56) | Italy | 18 December 2022 | World Championships | Melbourne, Australia | |
| 4×100m medley relay | 3:18.68 | WR, # | Miron Lifintsev (49.31); Kirill Prigoda (55.15); Andrei Minakov (48.80); Egor Kornev (45.42) | Russia | 15 December 2024 | World Championships | Budapest, Hungary | |

Legend: # – Record awaiting ratification by European Aquatics; WR – World record; e – equalled existing record;
Records not set in finals: h – heat; sf – semifinal; r – relay 1st leg; rh – relay heat 1st leg; b – B final; † – en route to final mark; so – swim-off; tt – time trial

=== Women ===
| Event | Time | | Name | Nationality | Date | Meet | Location | Ref |
|---|---|---|---|---|---|---|---|---|
| 50m freestyle | 22.93 | | Ranomi Kromowidjojo | Netherlands | 7 August 2017 | World Cup | Berlin, Germany | |
| 100m freestyle | 50.58 | | Sarah Sjöström | Sweden | 11 August 2017 | World Cup | Eindhoven, Netherlands | |
| 100m freestyle | 50.42 | # | Marrit Steenbergen | Netherlands | 6 December 2025 | European Championships | Lublin, Poland | |
| 100m freestyle | 50.32 | # | Marrit Steenbergen | Netherlands | 10 October 2026 | World Cup | Tashkent, Uzbekistan | |
| 200m freestyle | 1:50.43 | | Sarah Sjöström | Sweden | 12 August 2017 | World Cup | Eindhoven, Netherlands | |
| 200m freestyle | 1:50.33 | # | Marrit Steenbergen | Netherlands | 4 December 2025 | European Championships | Lublin, Poland | |
| 400m freestyle | 3:54.52 | | Mireia Belmonte | Spain | 11 August 2013 | World Cup | Berlin, Germany | |
| 400m freestyle | 3:54.33 | # | Isabel Gose | Germany | 2 December 2025 | European Championships | Lublin, Poland | |
| 800m freestyle | 7:59.34 | | Mireia Belmonte | Spain | 10 August 2013 | World Cup | Berlin, Germany | |
| 1500m freestyle | 15:18.01 | | Sarah Köhler | Germany | 16 November 2019 | German Championships | Berlin, Germany | |
| 50m backstroke | 25.60 | =, not ratified or later rescinded | Kira Toussaint | Netherlands | 14 November 2020 | International Swimming League | Budapest, Hungary | |
| 50m backstroke | 25.60 | = | Kira Toussaint | Netherlands | 18 December 2020 | Amsterdam Christmas Meet | Amsterdam, Netherlands | |
| 50m backstroke | 25.60 | =, not ratified | Maria Kameneva | Russia | 24 November 2022 | Solidarity Games | Kazan, Russia | |
| 50m backstroke | 25.47 | r, # | Marrit Steenbergen | Netherlands | 7 December 2025 | European Championships | Lublin, Poland | |
| 100m backstroke | 55.03 | | Katinka Hosszú | Hungary | 4 December 2014 | World Championships | Doha, Qatar | |
| 200m backstroke | 1:59.23 | | Katinka Hosszú | Hungary | 5 December 2014 | World Championships | Doha, Qatar | |
| 50m breaststroke | 28.37 | sf, WR | Rūta Meilutytė | Lithuania | 17 December 2022 | World Championships | Melbourne, Australia | |
| 100m breaststroke | 1:02.36 | =WR | Rūta Meilutytė | Lithuania | 12 October 2013 | World Cup | Moscow, Russia | |
| 200m breaststroke | 2:14.70 | | Evgeniia Chikunova | Russia | 25 November 2022 | Solidarity Games | Kazan, Russia | |
| 200m breaststroke | 2:14.39 | X | Yulia Efimova | Russia | 13 December 2013 | European Championships | Herning, Denmark | |
| 50m butterfly | 24.38 | | Therese Alshammar | Sweden | 22 November 2009 | World Cup | Singapore, Singapore | |
| 100m butterfly | 54.61 | | Sarah Sjöström | Sweden | 7 December 2014 | World Championships | Doha, Qatar | |
| 200m butterfly | 1:59.61 | | Mireia Belmonte | Spain | 3 December 2014 | World Championships | Doha, Qatar | |
| 100m individual medley | 56.51 | | Katinka Hosszú | Hungary | 7 August 2017 | World Cup | Berlin, Germany | |
| 100m individual medley | 56.26 | # | Marrit Steenbergen | Netherlands | 4 December 2025 | European Championships | Lublin, Poland | |
| 200m individual medley | 2:01.86 | | Katinka Hosszú | Hungary | 6 December 2014 | World Championships | Doha, Qatar | |
| 200m individual medley | 2:01.83 | # | Marrit Steenbergen | Netherlands | 6 December 2025 | European Championships | Lublin, Poland | |
| 400m individual medley | 4:18.94 | | Mireia Belmonte | Spain | 12 August 2017 | World Cup | Eindhoven, Netherlands | |
| 4×50m freestyle relay | 1:32.50 | tt, WR | Ranomi Kromowidjojo (23.05); Maaike de Waard (23.16); Kim Busch (23.47); Femke Heemskerk (22.82) | Netherlands | 12 December 2020 | Wouda Cup | Eindhoven, Netherlands | |
| 4×100m freestyle relay | 3:26.53 | | Inge Dekker (52.39); Femke Heemskerk (50.58); Maud van der Meer (52.55); Ranomi Kromowidjojo (51.01) | Netherlands | 5 December 2014 | World Championships | Doha, Qatar | |
| 4×200m freestyle relay | 7:32.85 | | Inge Dekker (1:54.73); Femke Heemskerk (1:51.22); Ranomi Kromowidjojo (1:54.17); Sharon van Rouwendaal (1:52.73) | Netherlands | 3 December 2014 | World Championships | Doha, Qatar | |
| 4×50m medley relay | 1:42.38 | | Louise Hansson (25.91); Sophie Hansson (29.07); Sarah Sjöström (23.96); Michelle Coleman (23.44) | Sweden | 17 December 2021 | World Championships | Abu Dhabi, United Arab Emirates | |
| 4×100m medley relay | 3:46.20 | | Louise Hansson (56.25); Sophie Hansson (1:03.70); Sarah Sjöström (54.65); Michelle Coleman (51.60) | Sweden | 21 December 2021 | World Championships | Abu Dhabi, United Arab Emirates | |

Legend: # – Record awaiting ratification by European Aquatics; WR – World record; e – equalled existing record;
Records not set in finals: h – heat; sf – semifinal; r – relay 1st leg; rh – relay heat 1st leg; b – B final; † – en route to final mark; so – swim-off; tt – time trial

=== Mixed relay ===
| Event | Time | | Name | Club | Date | Meet | Location | Ref |
|---|---|---|---|---|---|---|---|---|
| 4×50 m freestyle relay | 1:27.33 | WR | Maxime Grousset (20.92); Florent Manaudou (20.26); Béryl Gastaldello (23.00); Mélanie Henique (23.15) | France | 16 December 2022 | World Championships | Melbourne, Australia | |
| 4×50 m freestyle relay | 1:27.26 | WR, # | Leonardo Deplano (20.97); Lorenzo Zazzeri (20.51); Silvia Di Pietro (23.07); Sara Curtis (22.71) | Italy | 4 December 2025 | European Championships | Lublin, Poland | |
| 4×50 m medley relay | 1:35.36 | | Miron Lifincev (22.39); Kirill Prigoda (24.94); Arina Surkova (24.43); Daria Trofimova (23.60) | Russia | 11 December 2024 | World Championships | Budapest, Hungary | |

Legend: # – Record awaiting ratification by European Aquatics; WR – World record; e – equalled existing record;
Records not set in finals: h – heat; so – swim-off

== Record holders' rankings ==
=== By nation ===
| Record tally | Nation | LC | SC | Total | LC | SC | Total | LC | SC | Total |
| Record tally | Nation | Men | | | Women | | | Mixed | | |
|---|---|---|---|---|---|---|---|---|---|---|
| 15 | Russia | 2 | 8 | 10 | 2 | | 2 | 1 | 2 | 3 |
| 13 | France | 6 | 6 | 12 | | | | | 1 | 1 |
| 10 | Hungary | 2 | 1 | 3 | 3 | 4 | 7 | | | |
| 9 | Italy | 1 | 2 | 3 | 5 | 1 | 6 | | | |
| 8 | Sweden | | | | 3 | 5 | 8 | | | |
| 7 | Netherlands | | | | 2 | 5 | 7 | | | |
| 7 | Great Britain | 3 | 1 | 4 | 2 | | 2 | 1 | | 1 |
| 7 | Germany | 4 | 2 | 6 | | 1 | 1 | | | |
| 4 | Spain | | | | | 4 | 4 | | | |
| 3 | Lithuania | | | | 1 | 2 | 3 | | | |
| 2 | Denmark | | | | | 2 | 2 | | | |
| 2 | Ireland | 1 | 1 | 2 | | | | | | |
| 2 | Switzerland | | 2 | 2 | | | | | | |
| 1 | Belarus | | 1 | 1 | | | | | | |
| 1 | Ukraine | 1 | | 1 | | | | | | |
| 1 | Greece | | 1 | 1 | | | | | | |
| 1 | Romania | 1 | | 1 | | | | | | |

=== By athlete (men) ===
| European records | Name | Nationality | Events |
|---|---|---|---|
| 5 | Léon Marchand | France | 200 m individual medley LC; 400 m individual medley LC; 200 m breaststroke LC; 100 m individual medley SC; 200 m individual medley SC |
| 4 | Adam Peaty | Great Britain | 50 m breaststroke LC; 100 m breaststroke LC; 4 × 100 m medley relay LC; 4 × 100 m mixed medley relay LC |
| 3 | Kliment Kolesnikov | Russia | 50 m backstroke LC; 100 m backstroke SC; 4 × 100 m freestyle relay SC |
| 3 | Frédérick Bousquet | France | 50 m freestyle LC; 4 × 100 m freestyle relay LC; 4 × 50 m freestyle relay SC |
| 3 | James Guy | Great Britain | 4 × 200 m freestyle relay LC; 4 × 100 m medley relay LC; 4 × 100 m mixed medley relay LC |
| 3 | Amaury Leveaux | France | 4 × 100 m freestyle relay LC; 100 m freestyle SC; 4 × 50 m freestyle relay SC |
| 2 | Paul Biedermann | Germany | 200 m freestyle LC; 200 m freestyle SC |

=== By athlete (women) ===
| European records | Name | Nationality | Events |
|---|---|---|---|
| 7 | Sarah Sjöström | Sweden | 50 m freestyle LC; 50 m butterfly LC; 100 m butterfly LC; 100 m freestyle SC; 200 m freestyle SC; 100 m butterfly SC; 4×50 m medley relay SC |
| 7 | Katinka Hosszú | Hungary | 200 m butterfly LC; 200 m individual medley LC; 400 m individual medley LC; 100 m backstroke SC; 200 m backstroke SC; 100 m individual medley SC; 200 m individual medley SC |
| 5 | Ranomi Kromowidjojo | Netherlands | 4×100 m freestyle relay LC; 50 m freestyle SC; 4×50 m freestyle relay SC; 4×100 m freestyle relay SC; 4×200 m freestyle relay SC |
| 4 | Femke Heemskerk | Netherlands | 4×100 m freestyle relay LC; 4×50 m freestyle relay SC; 4×100 m freestyle relay SC; 4×200 m freestyle relay SC |
| 4 | Mireia Belmonte | Spain | 400 m freestyle SC; 800 m freestyle SC; 200 m butterfly SC; 400 m individual medley SC |
| 3 | Inge Dekker | Netherlands | 4×100 m freestyle relay LC; 4×50 m freestyle relay SC; 4×100 m freestyle relay SC |
| 3 | Rūta Meilutytė | Lithuania | 100 m breaststroke LC; 100 m breaststroke SC; 50 m breaststroke SC |
| 2 | Rikke Møller Pedersen | Denmark | 200 m breaststroke SC; 4×100 m medley relay SC |

== Notes ==
- WB: World all-time best performances. Before September 26, 2013, FINA did not recognise 4×50 m relays and therefore did not ratify any official world records for these events. European Aquatics does recognise these events as official and ratifies European records for them. European SC Championships are the most important international meets where these events are held: during these meets, world best performances are usually announced as world records even though they are not.
