= Mary-Ambre Moluh =

French swimmer (born 2005)

Personal information
- Nationality: French
- Born: 9 September 2005 (age 21) Champigny-sur-Marne, France
- Height: 1.76 m (5 ft 9 in)

Sport
- Sport: Swimming
- Strokes: Freestyle, Backstroke
- Club: US Créteil
Medal record
Women's swimming
Representing France
European Championships (LC)
Gold medal – first place	2026 Paris	100 m backstroke
Gold medal – first place	2026 Paris	4×100 m mixed medley
Silver medal – second place	2026 Paris	50 m backstroke
European Championships (SC)
Silver medal – second place	2023 Otopeni	4×50 m mixed medley
Bronze medal – third place	2023 Otopeni	100 m backstroke

Mary-Ambre Moluh (born 9 September 2005) is a French swimmer.

She competed in the 4×100 m mixed medley relay event at the 2026 European Aquatics Championships, winning the gold medal.

== Personal ==
Moluh has Cameroonian paternal origin, and Greek from her mother's side. She is fluent in Greek and English.
