= Alexander Cohoon =

English swimmer (born 2002)

Personal information
- Born: 17 September 2002 (age 23)
- Education: Farmor's School; Loughborough University
- Height: 1.93 m (6 ft 4 in)

Sport
- Sport: Swimming
- Strokes: Freestyle
- Club: Loughborough University; Cirencester SC

Alexander Cohoon (born 17 September 2002) is a British swimmer who competed at the 2024 Summer Olympics.

== Early life ==
From Fairford in Gloucestershire, he attended Farmor's School and was a member of Cirencester Swimming Club from the age of five years old. He attends Loughborough University. Until the age of 17 he was in the academy of Premiership Rugby side Gloucester Rugby.

== Career ==
In 2019 he won gold in the 50 metres freestyle in the 17+ years age group category at the English Nationals at Ponds Forge in Sheffield, in a personal best time of 23.86 seconds. At the same meet he won a silver in the 50m butterfly.

In 2022, he won four gold medals competing in the 50m freestyle; the 100m freestyle, 100m freestyle relay and the 100m medley relay at the British Universities & Colleges Sport (BUCS) competition. He defended all four titles successfully in Sheffield in March 2023.

In August 2023, he won an individual bronze medal in the men’s 100m freestyle and a silver medal in the mixed 4 x 100m freestyle relay at the European U-23 Championships.

He won the 50m freestyle and 100m freestyle races at the 2024 City of Sheffield Premier Meet.

He finished fourth in the 100m freestyle at the 2024 Aquatics GB Swimming Championships in April 2024 in a personal best time of 48.2 seconds. He was subsequently selected as part of the 2024 British Olympic team to participate in the 2024 Olympic Games. At the 2024 Olympic Games in Paris, he participated in the men's 50 metre freestyle competition, where he was eliminated in the heats.
