= Marrit Steenbergen =

Dutch swimmer (born 2000)

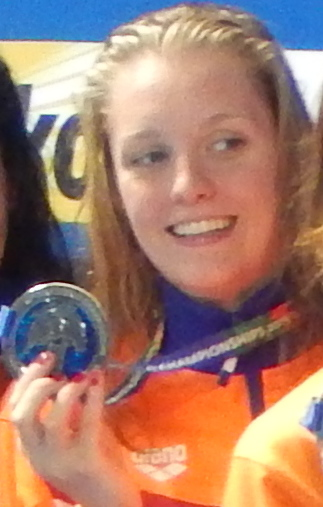
- Steenbergen with one of her Kazan 2015 medals

Personal information
- National team: Netherlands
- Born: 11 January 2000 (age 26) Ooststellingwerf, Netherlands
- Height: 1.78 m (5 ft 10 in)
- Weight: 61 kg (134 lb)

Sport
- Sport: Swimming
- Strokes: Freestyle, medley
Medal record
Women's swimming
Representing the Netherlands
World Championships (LC)
Gold medal – first place	2024 Doha	100 m freestyle
Gold medal – first place	2024 Doha	4×100 m freestyle
Gold medal – first place	2025 Singapore	100 m freestyle
Silver medal – second place	2015 Kazan	4×100 m freestyle
Silver medal – second place	2015 Kazan	4×100 m mixed freestyle
Bronze medal – third place	2022 Budapest	4×100 m mixed medley
Bronze medal – third place	2023 Fukuoka	100 m freestyle
Bronze medal – third place	2025 Singapore	4×100 m freestyle
World Championships (SC)
Gold medal – first place	2022 Melbourne	100 m medley
Bronze medal – third place	2016 Windsor	4×100 m freestyle
Bronze medal – third place	2021 Abu Dhabi	4×50 m freestyle
Bronze medal – third place	2022 Melbourne	100 m freestyle
Bronze medal – third place	2022 Melbourne	200 m freestyle
Bronze medal – third place	2022 Melbourne	4×50 m mixed freestyle
European Championships (LC)
Gold medal – first place	2016 London	4×100 m freestyle
Gold medal – first place	2016 London	4×100 m mixed freestyle
Gold medal – first place	2022 Rome	100 m freestyle
Gold medal – first place	2022 Rome	200 m freestyle
Gold medal – first place	2022 Rome	4×200 m freestyle
Gold medal – first place	2022 Rome	4×100 m mixed medley
Gold medal – first place	2026 Paris	100 m freestyle
Gold medal – first place	2026 Paris	4×100 m freestyle
Silver medal – second place	2020 Budapest	4×100 m freestyle
Silver medal – second place	2020 Budapest	4×100 m mixed freestyle
Silver medal – second place	2022 Rome	200 m individual medley
Silver medal – second place	2026 Paris	200 m freestyle
Silver medal – second place	2026 Paris	100 m backstroke
Silver medal – second place	2026 Paris	4×100 m mixed freestyle
Silver medal – second place	2026 Paris	4×100 m mixed medley
Bronze medal – third place	2016 London	4×200 m freestyle
Bronze medal – third place	2022 Rome	4×100 m freestyle
Bronze medal – third place	2022 Rome	4×100 m medley
European Championships (SC)
Gold medal – first place	2015 Netanya	4×50 m medley
Gold medal – first place	2021 Kazan	200 m freestyle
Gold medal – first place	2025 Lublin	100 m freestyle
Gold medal – first place	2025 Lublin	200 m freestyle
Gold medal – first place	2025 Lublin	100 m individual medley
Gold medal – first place	2025 Lublin	200 m individual medley
Gold medal – first place	2025 Lublin	4×50 m freestyle
Gold medal – first place	2025 Lublin	4×50 m medley
Bronze medal – third place	2025 Lublin	4×50 m mixed freestyle
Silver medal – second place	2025 Lublin	4×50 m mixed medley
Silver medal – second place	2015 Netanya	4×50 m freestyle
Bronze medal – third place	2015 Netanya	100 m medley
Bronze medal – third place	2021 Kazan	100 m freestyle
Junior level
European Games
Gold medal – first place	2015 Baku	100 m freestyle
Silver medal – second place	2015 Baku	50 m freestyle
Silver medal – second place	2015 Baku	200 m freestyle
Silver medal – second place	2015 Baku	4×100 m freestyle
Silver medal – second place	2015 Baku	4×200 m freestyle
Silver medal – second place	2015 Baku	4×100 m medley

Marrit Steenbergen (born 11 January 2000) is a Dutch competitive swimmer. She is the world record holder in the 100 meter freestyle (long course). She won the 100 m freestyle event at the 2024 and 2025 World Swimming Championships. She won gold medals in the 100 m and 200 m freestyle events at the 2022 European Championships held in Rome, Italy.

== Career ==
In 2013, Steenbergen competed at the 2013 European Youth Summer Olympic Festival, taking 2 silver medals (in 50 m freestyle and 100 m freestyle).

In June 2015, 15-year-old Steenbergen competed at the inaugural 2015 European Games in Baku, where she won gold in 100 m freestyle ahead of Russia's Arina Openysheva clocking in at 53.97 s. Steenbergen also won five silver medals (in the 50 m freestyle, 200 m freestyle, 4 × 200 m freestyle, 4 × 100 m medley, and 4 × 100 m freestyle). The swimming part of the Games were open to junior only.

Steenbergen went on to represent the Netherlands at the 2015 World Aquatics Championships, competing in two relay events. She won a silver medal on the first day of the competition in the women's 4 × 100 m freestyle relay, swimming the second leg in the heats and the third leg in the final. She won another silver medal as part of the mixed 4 × 100 m freestyle, swimming the third leg in the heats. She did not swim in the final.

At the 2015 European Short Course Championships in December 2015, Steenbergen won her first international championship medal at the senior level in an individual event. She won the bronze medal in the 100-meter individual medley in 59.00 seconds, finishing behind Katinka Hosszú, who broke the world record, and Siobhan-Marie O'Connor.

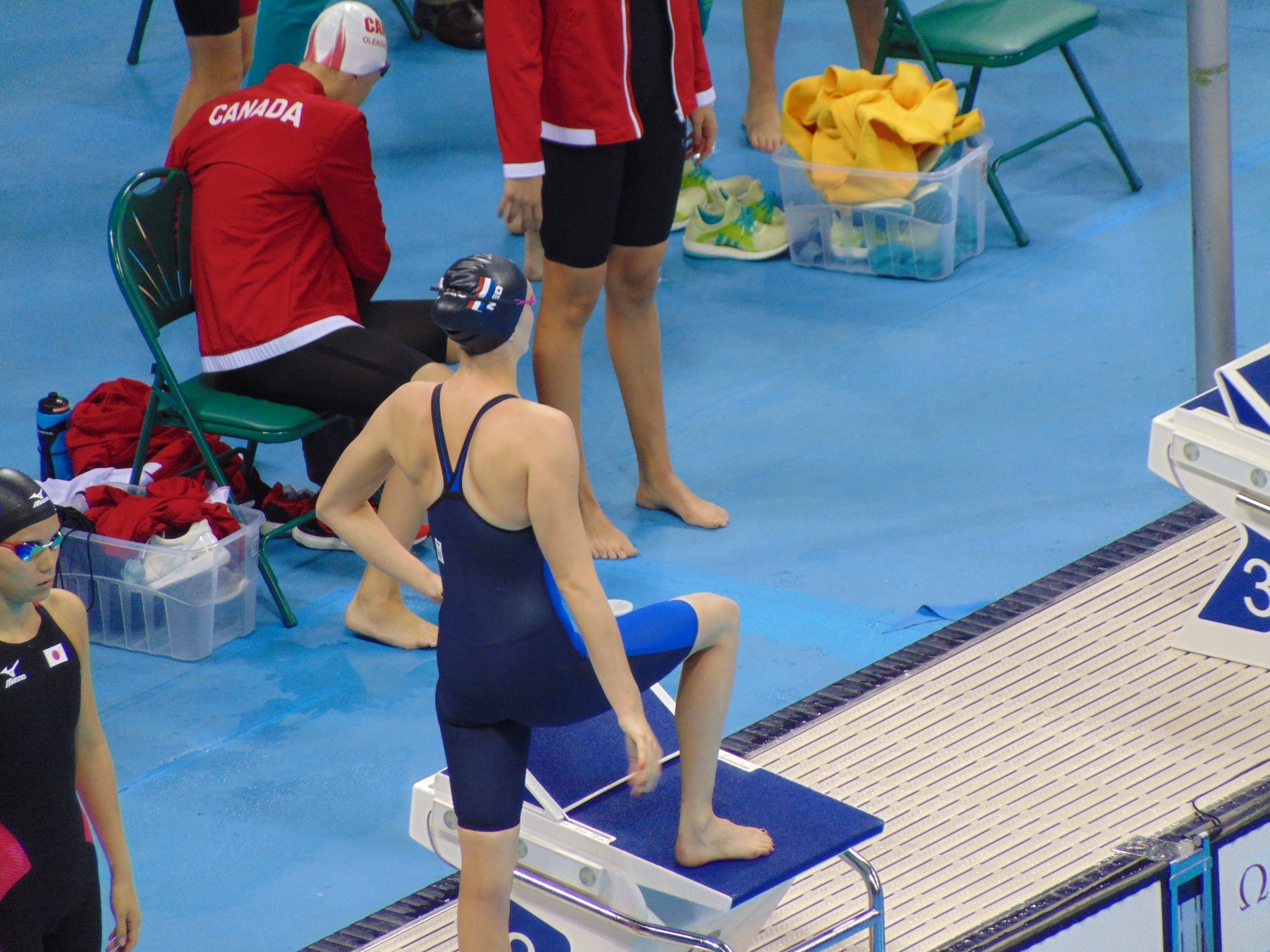
Steenbergen on the starting block, during the Rio 2016 Olympics.

Steenbergen qualified for the 2016 Summer Olympics in Rio de Janeiro in the 4 × 100 and 4 × 200 meter freestyle relays. In the 4×100 meter freestyle relay the team finished 4th in the final, with Steenbergen swimming the first leg. She also swam the 200 meter individual medley and finished 34th in the heats.

== Personal bests ==
Long course
Event	Time	Date	Location
50 m freestyle	24.09	2026-07-05	Eindhoven, Netherlands
100 m freestyle	51.68 WR	2026-06-27	Rome, Italy
200 m freestyle	1:54.65 NR	2026-08-13	Paris, France
50 m backstroke	27.16	2026-08-13	Paris, France
100 m backstroke	58.33 NR	2026-07-02	Eindhoven, Netherlands
200 m medley	2:08.86 NR	2024-04-13	Eindhoven, Netherlands
400 m medley	4:44.28 NR	2023-04-07	Rotterdam, Netherlands

Short course
Event	Time	Date	Location
50 m freestyle	23.41	2026-10-16	Astana, Kazachstan
100 m freestyle	50.32 ER, NR	2026-10-10	Tashkent, Uzbekistan
200 m freestyle	1:50.23 ER, NR	2026-10-15	Astana, Kazachstan
50 m backstroke	25.47 ER, NR	2025-12-07	Lublin, Poland
100 m backstroke	55.17 =NR	2026-10-02	Baku, Azerbaijan
100 m medley	56.18 ER, NR	2026-10-08	Tashkent, Uzbekistan
200 m medley	2:01.83 ER, NR	2025-12-06	Lublin, Poland
400 m medley	4:31.08 NR	2026-11-07	Eindhoven, Nederland

== See also ==
- List of European Aquatics Championships medalists in swimming (women)

Records
Preceded by (Sweden) Sarah Sjöström	Women's 100m freestyle world record holder (long course); 27 June 2026 – present	Incumbent
