= Costanza Cocconcelli =

Italian swimmer (born 2002)

Personal information
- Nationality: Italian
- Born: 26 January 2002 (age 24) Bologna, Italy

Sport
- Sport: Swimming
Medal record
Women's swimming
Representing Italy
World Championships (SC)
Silver medal – second place	2022 Melbourne	4×50 m mixed medley
European Championships (SC)
Gold medal – first place	2025 Lublin	4×50 m mixed medley
Silver medal – second place	2021 Kazan	4×50 m mixed freestyle
Silver medal – second place	2021 Kazan	4×50 m mixed medley
Silver medal – second place	2025 Lublin	4×50 m freestyle
Bronze medal – third place	2025 Lublin	4×50 m medley
Mediterranean Games
Gold medal – first place	2026 Taranto	50 m backstroke
Gold medal – first place	2026 Taranto	4×100 m mixed medley
World Junior Championships
Bronze medal – third place	2019 Budapest	4×100 m mixed freestyle
European Junior Championships
Gold medal – first place	2019 Kazan	50 m freestyle
Silver medal – second place	2019 Kazan	4×100 m medley
Bronze medal – third place	2019 Kazan	50 m backstroke
Bronze medal – third place	2019 Kazan	50 m butterfly
Bronze medal – third place	2019 Kazan	4×100 m mixed freestyle
European Youth Olympic Festival
Gold medal – first place	2017 Győr	50 m freestyle
Silver medal – second place	2017 Győr	4×100 m mixed freestyle
Bronze medal – third place	2017 Győr	100 m backstroke
Bronze medal – third place	2017 Győr	200 m medley

Costanza Cocconcelli (born 26 January 2002) is an Italian swimmer. She competed in the women's 4 × 100 metre freestyle relay event at the 2020 European Aquatics Championships, in Budapest, Hungary, reaching the final.
