= Béryl Gastaldello =

French swimmer (born 1995)

Personal information
- Full name: Béryl Émilie Paulette Gastaldello
- National team: France
- Born: 16 February 1995 (age 31) Marseille, France
- Height: 176 cm (5 ft 9 in)
- Weight: 66 kg (146 lb)

Sport
- Sport: Swimming
- Strokes: Freestyle, Butterfly
- Club: Cercle des Nageurs de Marseille; LA Current
- College team: Texas A&M University
- Coach: Steve Bultman (Texas A&M); Mathieu Burban (CN Marseille)
Medal record
Women's swimming
Representing France
World Championships (LC)
Bronze medal – third place	2019 Gwangju	4×100 m mixed freestyle
Bronze medal – third place	2025 Singapore	4×100 m mixed freestyle
World Championships (SC)
Gold medal – first place	2022 Melbourne	4×50 m mixed freestyle
Silver medal – second place	2021 Abu Dhabi	100 m medley
Silver medal – second place	2022 Melbourne	100 m medley
Silver medal – second place	2024 Budapest	100 m freestyle
Silver medal – second place	2024 Budapest	50 m butterfly
Bronze medal – third place	2024 Budapest	100 m medley
European Championships (LC)
Gold medal – first place	2018 Glasgow	4×100 m freestyle
Gold medal – first place	2018 Glasgow	4×100 m mixed freestyle
Gold medal – first place	2022 Rome	4×100 m mixed freestyle
Silver medal – second place	2022 Rome	4×100 m medley
European Championships (SC)
Gold medal – first place	2012 Chartres	4×50 m freestyle
Gold medal – first place	2019 Glasgow	4×50 m freestyle
Silver medal – second place	2019 Glasgow	100 m freestyle
Silver medal – second place	2019 Glasgow	50 m backstroke
Silver medal – second place	2019 Glasgow	50 m butterfly
Silver medal – second place	2025 Lublin	50 m freestyle
Silver medal – second place	2025 Lublin	100 m freestyle
Bronze medal – third place	2012 Chartres	4×50 m medley
Bronze medal – third place	2019 Glasgow	4×50 m mixed freestyle
Bronze medal – third place	2025 Lublin	50 m butterfly
Mediterranean Games
Gold medal – first place	2013 Mersin	4×100 m freestyle
Bronze medal – third place	2013 Mersin	100 m butterfly
Bronze medal – third place	2013 Mersin	4×100 m medley
European Junior Championships
Gold medal – first place	2011 Belgrade	4×100 m freestyle

Béryl Émilie Paulette Gastaldello (born 16 February 1995) is a French swimmer and French national record holder in the 50-meter backstroke who competed for Texas A&M University, and participated in the 2016 and 2020 Olympics in freestyle and stroke events. Excelling in international competition, she was a five-time gold medal winner in individual and relay freestyle events at the European Championships.

Gastaldello was born 16 February 1996 in Southern coastal Marseille, to swimmers Véronique Jardin and Éric Gastaldello. Her paternal grandmother Amélie Mirkowitch was also a swimmer. She attended Académie de Nice, and grew up in Miramas, France, 35 miles Northeast of Marseille. She started swimming at the age of 8 and began serious training when she reached 16. In France, she trained with Cercle Des Nageurs de Marseille where she was coached and mentored by Mathieu Burban.

Around 18 in 2014, she moved to College Station, Texas as an international recruit for Texas A&M. Although her specialization is mostly butterfly and freestyle, she broke the French national record in the 50m backstroke in 2015. At the end of her college career at Texas A&M, she entered the European Championships held in Glasgow in 2018 and won her first gold medal in international competition.

== Texas A&M University ==
Gastaldello attended Texas A&M University and swam for the Aggies Swimming team from 2014-2018, where she was trained and managed by Hall of Fame coach Steve Bultman. At Texas A&M, Gastaldello earned All-American honors 13 times. She was the University record holder in both the 50 and 100-free style and also held records in the 400 free relay and both the 200 and 400 medley relays.

Performing well in conference competition, in 2015, she captured an SEC championship title in the 100 butterfly. In both 2016 and 2017, she was an SEC title holder in the 400 medley relay.

=== World aquatics, French Nationals ===
She competed at the 2015 World Aquatics Championships, as well as in the 2017 World Aquatics Championships. More significantly, she medaled in the World Aquatics Championships in 2019, 2021, and 2022 taking a gold in the 4x50 freestyle relay, a bronze in the 4x100 freestyle relay, and two silvers in the 100-meter medley. At the 2019 French National Championships, she also captured a gold medal.

== 2016, 2020 Olympics ==
At a high point in international competition, Gastaldello competed for France in the 2016 Rio de Janeiro Summer Olympics in the 100-meter freestyle, the 4x100-meter freestyle relay, the 100-meter butterfly, and the 4x100-meter medley relay. Her best finish was seventh in the 4x100-meter freestyle relay, where the French team made the finals.

She also participated in the 2020 Tokyo Summer Olympics for France in the 4x100-meter freestyle relay, placing 10th, and in the 100-meter backstroke, where she placed 23rd.

Gastaldello was a third-generation Olympic athlete representing France. As a professional, she has been a member of the LA Current Club Team of the International Swim League (ISL), and has been represented by ELIS Athletics, an international sports management and marketing agency.

Her hobbies include skateboarding and playing percussion.
