= Tessa Giele =

Dutch swimmer (born 2002)

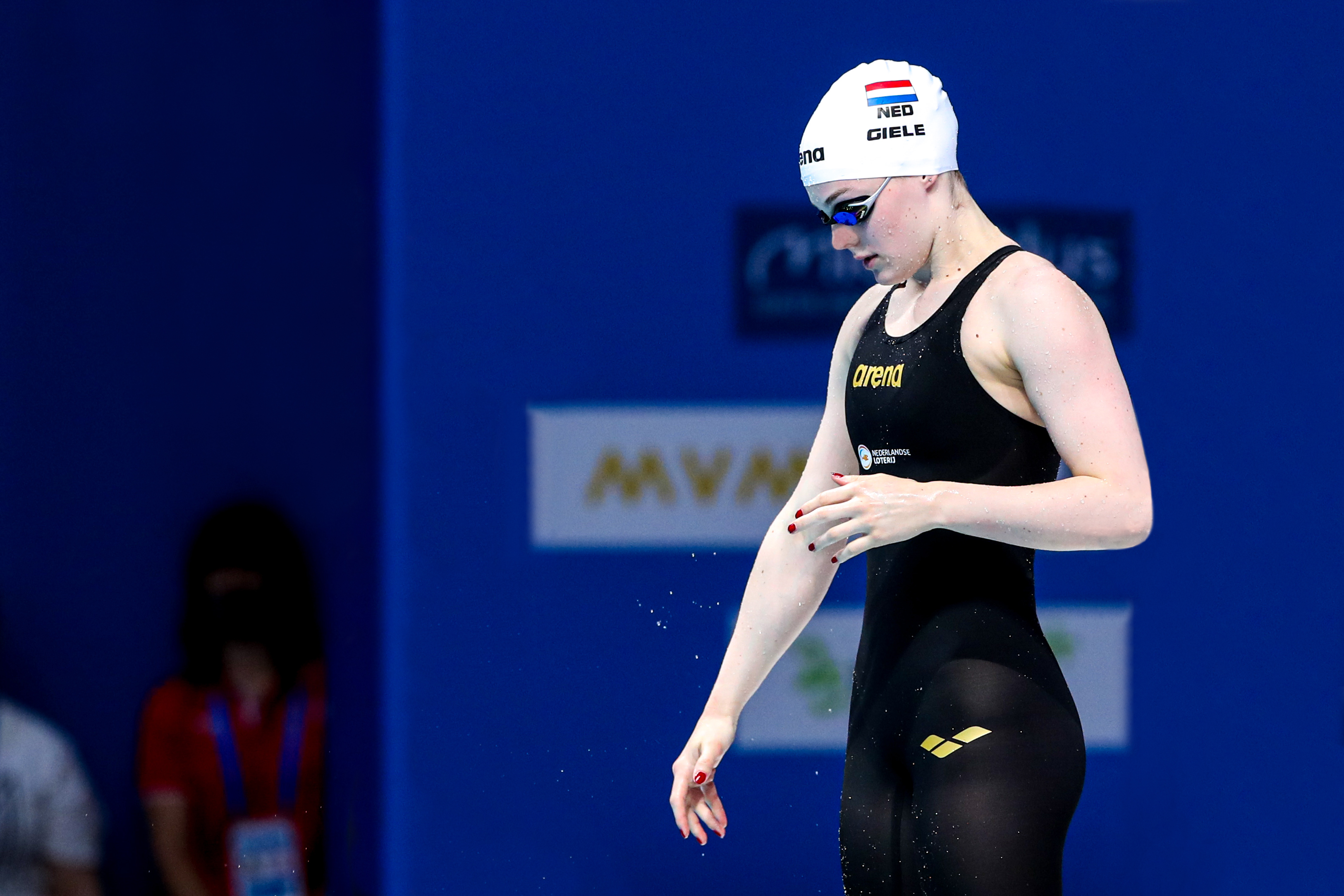
- Tessa Giele at the European Championships 2021, Budapest

Personal information
- Nationality: Dutch
- Born: 1 November 2002 (age 23) Vierpolders, Netherlands

Sport
- Sport: Swimming
- Strokes: butterfly, crawl
Medal record
Women's swimming
Representing the Netherlands
World Championships (LC)
Bronze medal – third place	2025 Singapore	4×100 m freestyle
World Championships (SC)
Silver medal – second place	2024 Budapest	100 m butterfly
European Championships (LC)
Gold medal – first place	2022 Rome	4×100 m mixed medley
Gold medal – first place	2026 Paris	4×100 m freestyle
Silver medal – second place	2026 Paris	4×100 m mixed medley
Bronze medal – third place	2022 Rome	4×100 m freestyle
Bronze medal – third place	2022 Rome	4×100 m medley
European Championships (SC)
Gold medal – first place	2025 Lublin	4×50 m freestyle
Gold medal – first place	2025 Lublin	4×50 m medley
Silver medal – second place	2025 Lublin	100 m butterfly
Bronze medal – third place	2025 Lublin	4×50 m mixed freestyle

Tessa Giele (born 1 November 2002) is a Dutch competitive swimmer who specializes in butterfly events.

She competed at the 2021 FINA World Swimming Championships (25 m).

== Personal bests ==
Short course
Event	Time	Date	Location
50 m butterfly	25.87	2021-11-06	Kazan, Russia
100 m butterfly	56.88	2021-12-20	Abu Dhabi, United Arab Emerates
200 m butterfly	2:09.48	2021-12-04	The Hague, Netherlands

Long course
Event	Time	Date	Location
50 m butterfly	26.78	2021-04-11	Eindhoven, Netherlands
100 m butterfly	59.97	2021-04-09	Eindhoven, Netherlands
200 m butterfly	2:22.05	2019-06-22	Amersfoort, Netherlands
