= Swimming at the 2024 European Aquatics Championships – Men's 100 metre freestyle =

Men's 100 metre freestyle at the 2024 European Aquatics Championships
- Venue: Sports Centre Milan Gale Muškatirović
- Dates: 18 June (heats and semifinals); 19 June (final)
- Competitors: 85 from 33 nations
- Winning time: 46.88

Medalists
gold medal	David Popovici	Romania
silver medal	Nándor Németh	Hungary
bronze medal	Andrej Barna	Serbia

The Men's 100 metre freestyle competition of the 2024 European Aquatics Championships was held on 18 and 19 June 2024.

== Records ==
Prior to the competition, the existing world, European and championship records were as follows.

	Name	Nationality	Time	Location	Date
World record	Pan Zhanle	China	46.80	Doha	11 February 2024
European record	David Popovici	Romania	46.86	Rome	13 August 2022
Championship record	David Popovici	Romania	46.86	Rome	13 August 2022

== Results ==
=== Heats ===
The heats were started on 18 June at 09:38.
Qualification Rules: The 16 fastest from the heats qualify to the semifinals.

Rank	Heat	Lane	Name	Nationality	Time	Notes
1	8	4	David Popovici	Romania	47.90	Q
2	7	4	Andrej Barna	Serbia	48.14	Q
3	9	4	Nándor Németh	Hungary	48.40	Q
4	7	5	Kristóf Milák	Hungary	48.41	Q
5	7	6	Kamil Sieradzki	Poland	48.54	Q
6	9	6	Danas Rapsys	Lithuania	48.63	Q
7	7	2	Ralph Daleiden Ciuferri	Luxembourg	48.68	Q
8	8	3	Shane Ryan	Ireland	48.69	Q
9	8	5	Heiko Gigler	Austria	48.71	Q
10	9	3	Peter Varjasi	Germany	48.74	Q
11	6	9	Rémi Fabiani	Luxembourg	48.64	Q
12	8	1	Tomas Navikonis	Lithuania	48.91	Q
13	8	2	Mateusz Chowaniec	Poland	48.91	Q
14	7	8	Patrick Dinu	Romania	48.94	Q
15	6	2	Martin Wrede	Germany	48.98	Q
15	9	1	Jere Hribar	Croatia	48.98	Q
17	7	1	Ole-Mats Eidam	Germany	49.06	
18	9	2	Dominik Dudys	Poland	49.07	
19	6	4	Kaloyan Bratanov	Bulgaria	49.10	
20	9	5	Nikola Miljenić	Croatia	49.11	
21	8	7	Velimir Stjepanović	Serbia	49.16	
22	5	4	Nikola Aćin	Serbia	49.22	
23	8	6	Bartosz Piszczorowicz	Poland	49.25	
24	8	0	Tomas Lukminas	Lithuania	49.35	
25	6	1	Frederik Lentz	Denmark	49.37	
26	9	0	Dániel Mészáros	Hungary	49.47	
26	9	7	Alexander Painter	Great Britain	49.47	
28	4	3	Alexey Glivinskiy	Israel	49.49	
29	6	7	Illya Linnyk	Ukraine	49.51	
30	3	7	Toni Dragoja	Croatia	49.52	
31	7	9	Antonio Djakovic	Switzerland	49.55	
32	6	5	Deniel Nankov	Bulgaria	49.58	
33	4	6	Vili Sivec	Croatia	49.65	
33	8	9	Robin Hanson	Sweden	49.65	
35	8	8	Bence Szabados	Hungary	49.75	
36	9	8	Matej Duša	Slovakia	49.82	
37	5	0	Lars Kuljus	Estonia	49.83	
37	6	6	George-Adrian Ratiu	Romania	49.83	
39	5	6	Martin Kartavi	Israel	49.84	
40	5	3	Isak Eliasson	Sweden	49.88	
41	5	7	Elias Persson	Sweden	49.92	
42	4	5	Artur Barseghyan	Armenia	49.96	
43	4	4	Tomas Koski	Finland	50.00	
44	9	9	Odysseus Meladinis	Greece	50.02	
45	4	8	Oliver Søgaard-Andersen	Denmark	50.11	
46	5	5	Daniel Zaitsev	Estonia	50.12	
46	5	9	Rokas Jazdauskas	Lithuania	50.12	
48	5	8	Rasmus Nickelsen	Denmark	50.16	
48	7	7	Edward Mildred	Great Britain	50.16	
50	7	3	Denis Loktev	Israel	50.19	
51	5	2	Tiago Behar	Switzerland	50.24	
52	5	1	Romano Yoav	Israel	50.26	
53	3	5	Alex Ahtiainen	Estonia	50.29	
54	6	8	Uroš Nikolić	Serbia	50.32	
55	4	9	Alexander Trampitsch	Austria	50.35	
56	6	0	Alexandru-Richard Szilagyi	Romania	50.37	
57	3	6	Adi Mešetović	Bosnia and Herzegovina	50.38	
58	3	2	Reds Rullis	Austria	50.40	
59	3	2	Ronny Brannkarr	Finland	50.59	
60	4	7	Marcus Holmquist	Sweden	50.60	
61	3	4	Leon Opatril	Austria	50.76	
62	3	3	Artem Selin	Austria	50.78	
63	2	3	Egor Covaliov	Moldova	51.04	
64	2	2	Kenan Dracic	Bosnia and Herzegovina	51.16	
65	4	1	William Textor-Broch	Denmark	51.19	
66	2	7	Bernat Lomero	Andorra	51.46	
67	2	6	Símon Elías Statkevicius	Iceland	51.51	
68	2	8	Moritz Dittrich	Austria	51.59	
69	1	5	Luka Kukhalashvili	Georgia	51.66	
70	3	1	Alaa Maso	ERT	51.73	
71	1	3	Mackey Nurkic Kacapor	Bosnia and Herzegovina	51.80	
72	3	9	Jegors Mihailovs	Latvia	51.87	
73	3	8	Staņislavs Šakels	Latvia	51.95	
74	2	4	Valerijs Čurgelis	Latvia	52.01	
75	2	1	Ari-Pekka Liukkonen	Finland	52.09	
76	3	0	Oisin Tebite	Ireland	52.22	
77	1	6	Bartal Erlingsson Eidesgaard	Faroe Islands	52.32	
78	1	2	Jovan Jankovski	North Macedonia	52.45	
78	2	0	Pavel Alovatki	Moldova	52.45	
80	1	7	Paolo Priska	Albania	52.63	
81	2	9	Grisi Koxhaku	Albania	52.85	
82	1	4	Tomàs Lomero	Andorra	53.02	
83	1	1	Nikola Trajanovski	North Macedonia	53.32	
84	1	8	Rashad Alguliev	Azerbaijan	53.97	
85	4	2	Kalle Makinen	Finland	1:02.09	
	6	3	Evan Bailey	Ireland	DNS	
	7	0	Calvin Fry	Great Britain	DNS	

=== Semifinals ===
The semifinal were started on 18 June at 19:03.
Qualification Rules: The first 2 competitors of each semifinal and the remaining fastest (up to a total of 8 qualified competitors) from the semifinals advance to the final.

Rank	Heat	Lane	Name	Nationality	Time	Notes
1	2	4	David Popovici	Romania	47.82	Q
2	1	4	Andrej Barna	Serbia	48.04	Q
3	2	5	Nándor Németh	Hungary	48.05	Q
4	1	5	Kristóf Milák	Hungary	48.26	Q
5	1	3	Danas Rapsys	Lithuania	48.39	Q, NR
5	1	6	Shane Ryan	Ireland	48.39	Q, NR
5	1	8	Jere Hribar	Croatia	48.39	Q
8	2	3	Kamil Sieradzki	Poland	48.48	Q
9	2	1	Mateusz Chowaniec	Poland	48.51	
10	1	7	Tomas Navikonis	Lithuania	48.62	
11	1	2	Peter Varjasi	Germany	48.83	
12	2	2	Heiko Gigler	Austria	48.84	
13	2	6	Ralph Daleiden Ciuferri	Luxembourg	48.85	
14	1	1	Patrick Dinu	Romania	48.87	
15	2	8	Martin Wrede	Germany	49.09	
16	2	7	Rémi Fabiani	Luxembourg	49.10	

=== Final ===
The final was held on 19 June at 18:52.

Rank	Lane	Name	Nationality	Time	Notes
1st place, gold medalist(s)	4	David Popovici	Romania	46.88	
2nd place, silver medalist(s)	3	Nándor Németh	Hungary	47.49	
3rd place, bronze medalist(s)	5	Andrej Barna	Serbia	47.66	NR
4	2	Danas Rapsys	Lithuania	48.04	NR
5	1	Jere Hribar	Croatia	48.38	
6	6	Kristóf Milák	Hungary	48.41	
7	7	Shane Ryan	Ireland	48.76	
8	8	Kamil Sieradzki	Poland	48.84	
