= Swimming at the 2024 World Aquatics Championships – Men's 4 × 200 metre freestyle relay =

Men's 4 × 200 metre freestyle relay at the Swimming at the 2024 World Aquatics Championships
- Venue: Aspire Dome
- Location: Doha, Qatar
- Dates: 16 February (heats and final)
- Competitors: 65 from 15 nations
- Teams: 15
- Winning time: 7:01.84

Medalists
| gold medal | Ji Xinjie; Wang Haoyu; Pan Zhanle; Zhang Zhanshuo | China |
| silver medal | Yang Jae-hoon; Kim Woo-min; Lee Ho-joon; Hwang Sun-woo; Lee Yoo-yeon | South Korea |
| bronze medal | Luke Hobson; Carson Foster; Hunter Armstrong; David Johnston; Shaine Casas | United States |

The Men's 4 × 200 metre freestyle relay competition at the 2024 World Aquatics Championships was held on 16 February 2024.

== Records ==
Prior to the competition, the existing world and championship records were as follows.

| World record | United States | 6:58.55 | Rome, Italy | 31 July 2009 |
| Competition record | United States | 6:58.55 | Rome, Italy | 31 July 2009 |

== Results ==
=== Heats ===
The heats were started at 10:49.

| Rank | Heat | Lane | Nation | Swimmers | Time | Notes |
|---|---|---|---|---|---|---|
| 1 | 1 | 5 | China | Ji Xinjie (1:46.68); Zhang Zhanshuo (1:46.93); Wang Haoyu (1:47.10); Pan Zhanle (1:46.22) | 7:06.93 | Q |
| 2 | 2 | 5 | South Korea | Lee Ho-joon (1:47.60); Lee Yoo-yeon (1:47.13); Kim Woo-min (1:46.56); Hwang Sun-woo (1:46.32) | 7:07.61 | Q |
| 3 | 2 | 3 | Italy | Alessandro Ragaini (1:47.63); Stefano Di Cola (1:47.15); Marco De Tullio (1:47.66); Filippo Megli (1:46.04) | 7:08.48 | Q |
| 4 | 2 | 8 | Greece | Dimitrios Markos (1:47.26); Konstantinos Englezakis (1:47.14); Konstantinos Stamou (1:47.32); Andreas Vazaios (1:48.18) | 7:09.90 | Q, NR |
| 5 | 1 | 7 | Lithuania | Danas Rapšys (1:45.78); Tomas Navikonis (1:47.38); Tomas Lukminas (1:48.07); Rokas Jazdauskas (1:48.74) | 7:09.97 | Q, NR |
| 6 | 2 | 4 | Great Britain | Matt Richards (1:47.46); Jack McMillan (1:47.83); Max Litchfield (1:46.88); Joe Litchfield (1:47.98) | 7:10.15 | Q |
| 7 | 1 | 6 | Spain | Luis Domínguez (1:47.02) NR; César Castro (1:46.06); Sergio de Celis (1:48.27); Carlos Quijada (1:49.28) | 7:10.63 | Q, NR |
| 8 | 1 | 4 | United States | Luke Hobson (1:46.86); Hunter Armstrong (1:46.81); David Johnston (1:48.16); Shaine Casas (1:48.87) | 7:10.70 | Q |
| 9 | 1 | 3 | Brazil | Fernando Scheffer (1:49.05); Guilherme Costa (1:47.17); Eduardo Moraes (1:48.37); Breno Correia (1:47.20) | 7:11.79 | |
| 10 | 2 | 6 | Canada | Finlay Knox (1:48.17); Javier Acevedo (1:47.78); Blake Tierney (1:49.51); Lorne Wigginton (1:47.83) | 7:13.29 | |
| 11 | 1 | 2 | Poland | Kamil Sieradzki (1:48.07); Mateusz Chowaniec (1:48.48); Mikołaj Filipiak (1:50.90); Christian Sztolcman (1:47.53) | 7:14.98 | |
| 12 | 2 | 7 | Mexico | Jorge Iga (1:47.69); Andrés Dupont (1:47.08); Héctor Ruvalcaba (1:49.75); Dylan Porges (1:51.24) | 7:15.76 | NR |
| 13 | 1 | 1 | Bulgaria | Petar Mitsin (1:48.04); Kaloyan Bratanov (1:50.43); Kaloyan Levterov (1:51.69); Yordan Yanchev (1:50.90) | 7:21.06 | |
| 14 | 2 | 1 | Thailand | Dulyawat Kaewsriyong (1:54.25); Ratthawit Thammananthachote (1:51.45); Navaphat Wongcharoen (1:54.13); Tonnam Kanteemool (1:52.09) | 7:31.92 | |
| 15 | 2 | 2 | Vietnam | Trần Hưng Nguyên (1:53.99); Nguyễn Quang Thuấn (1:52.97); Ngô Đình Chuyền (1:53.28); Nguyễn Huy Hoàng (1:51.98) | 7:32.22 | |

=== Final ===
The final was held at 20:33.

| Rank | Lane | Nation | Swimmers | Time | Notes |
|---|---|---|---|---|---|
| 1st place, gold medalist(s) | 4 | China | Ji Xinjie (1:46.45); Wang Haoyu (1:45.69); Pan Zhanle (1:43.90); Zhang Zhanshuo (1:45.80) | 7:01.84 | NR |
| 2nd place, silver medalist(s) | 5 | South Korea | Yang Jae-hoon (1:47.78); Kim Woo-min (1:44.93); Lee Ho-joon (1:45.47); Hwang Sun-woo (1:43.76) | 7:01.94 | |
| 3rd place, bronze medalist(s) | 8 | United States | Luke Hobson (1:45.26); Carson Foster (1:43.94); Hunter Armstrong (1:45.73); David Johnston (1:47.15) | 7:02.08 | |
| 4 | 7 | Great Britain | Matt Richards (1:46.22); Max Litchfield (1:46.89); Jack McMillan (1:46.39); Duncan Scott (1:45.59) | 7:05.09 | |
| 5 | 3 | Italy | Filippo Megli (1:46.82); Alessandro Ragaini (1:46.76); Matteo Ciampi (1:46.09); Stefano Di Cola (1:47.33) | 7:07.00 | |
| 6 | 6 | Greece | Dimitrios Markos (1:46.74); Konstantinos Englezakis (1:47.65); Konstantinos Stamou (1:48.02); Andreas Vazaios (1:46.69) | 7:09.10 | NR |
| 7 | 2 | Lithuania | Danas Rapšys (1:46.37); Tomas Navikonis (1:47.86); Tomas Lukminas (1:48.13); Rokas Jazdauskas (1:49.21) | 7:11.57 | |
| 8 | 1 | Spain | César Castro (1:47.01) NR; Luis Domínguez (1:47.27); Sergio de Celis (1:48.30); Mario Mollà (1:49.07) | 7:11.65 | |
