= Swimming at the 2024 European Aquatics Championships – Men's 200 metre freestyle =

Men's 200 metre freestyle at the 2024 European Aquatics Championships
- Venue: Sports Centre Milan Gale Muškatirović
- Dates: 20 June (heats and semifinals); 21 June (final)
- Competitors: 59 from 30 nations
- Winning time: 1:43.13

Medalists
gold medal	David Popovici	Romania
silver medal	Danas Rapšys	Lithuania
bronze medal	Antonio Djakovic	Switzerland

The Men's 200 metre freestyle competition of the 2024 European Aquatics Championships was held on 20 and 21 June 2024.

== Records ==
Prior to the competition, the existing world, European and championship records were as follows.

	Name	Nationality	Time	Location	Date
World record	Paul Biedermann	Germany	1:42.00	Rome	28 July 2009
European record	Paul Biedermann	Germany	1:42.00	Rome	28 July 2009
Championship record	David Popovici	Romania	1:42.97	Rome	15 August 2022

== Results ==
=== Heats ===
The heats were started on 20 June at 09:30.
Qualification Rules: The 16 fastest from the heats qualify to the semifinals.

Rank	Heat	Lane	Name	Nationality	Time	Notes
1	7	4	David Popovici	Romania	1:45.44	Q
2	5	5	Velimir Stjepanović	Serbia	1:47.18	Q
3	6	4	Danas Rapšys	Lithuania	1:47.27	Q
4	5	4	Antonio Djakovic	Switzerland	1:47.61	Q
5	6	7	Niko Janković	Croatia	1:47.69	Q
6	7	2	Tomas Navikonis	Lithuania	1:47.73	Q
7	6	3	Kamil Sieradzki	Poland	1:47.80	Q
8	5	3	Bar Soloveychik	Israel	1:47.88	Q
9	6	2	Tomas Koski	Finland	1:47.97	Q
10	7	3	Robin Hanson	Sweden	1:48.05	Q
11	6	9	Tomas Lukminas	Lithuania	1:48.22	
12	6	8	Konstantinos Englezakis	Greece	1:48.25	Q
13	7	7	Romano Yoav	Israel	1:48.27	Q
14	4	3	Oliver Søgaard-Andersen	Denmark	1:48.36	Q
15	6	0	Philipp Peschke	Germany	1:48.67	Q
16	7	5	Dimitrios Markos	Greece	1:48.72	Q
17	6	6	Sašo Boškan	Slovenia	1:48.74	Q
18	5	2	Illia Linnyk	Ukraine	1:48.88	
19	5	1	Danny Schmidt	Germany	1:49.02	
20	6	5	Kristóf Milák	Hungary	1:49.06	
21	7	1	Evan Bailey	Ireland	1:49.07	
22	5	7	Richárd Márton	Hungary	1:49.11	
22	6	1	Jovan Lekic	Bosnia and Herzegovina	1:49.11	
24	4	4	Kristupas Trepocka	Lithuania	1:49.13	
25	7	6	Kregor Zirk	Estonia	1:49.24	
26	5	6	Eitan Ben Shitrit	Israel	1:49.25	
27	4	5	Alexander Painter	Great Britain	1:49.51	
28	3	4	Yordan Yanchev	Bulgaria	1:49.54	
29	4	6	František Jablčník	Slovakia	1:49.55	
30	7	8	Attila Kovács	Hungary	1:49.71	
31	3	5	Vadym Naumenko	Ukraine	1:49.83	
32	5	0	Jarno Baschnitt	Germany	1:49.96	
33	4	0	Kenan Dracic	Bosnia and Herzegovina	1:50.42	
34	4	1	Cormac Rynn	Ireland	1:50.57	
35	4	8	Tiago Behar	Switzerland	1:51.03	
36	5	9	Alexander Trampitsch	Austria	1:51.07	
37	7	0	Finn McGeever	Ireland	1:51.39	
38	2	1	Gian-Luca Gartmann	Switzerland	1:51.50	
39	2	3	Marius Toscan	Switzerland	1:51.77	
40	3	2	Luka Kukhalashvili	Georgia	1:52.07	
41	3	8	Loris Bianchi	San Marino	1:52.15	NR
42	3	7	Pavel Alovatki	Moldova	1:52.43	
43	2	4	Egor Covaliov	Moldova	1:52.50	
44	3	6	Ognjen Pilipović	Serbia	1:52.79	
45	2	5	Nikola Simic	Serbia	1:53.03	
46	2	7	Primož Senica Pavletic	Slovenia	1:53.10	
47	2	2	Mihailo Gasic	Serbia	1:53.22	
48	3	1	Reds Rullis	Latvia	1:53.24	
48	3	9	Arne Furlan Štular	Slovenia	1:53.24	
50	3	0	Artur Barseghyan	Armenia	1:53.47	
51	2	6	Jaka Pušnik	Slovenia	1:53.49	
52	4	7	Lars Kuljus	Estonia	1:53.96	
53	1	5	Mackey Nurkic Kacapor	Bosnia and Herzegovina	1:54.13	
54	2	8	Filip Kuruzovic	Bosnia and Herzegovina	1:54.13	
55	5	8	Marius Zobel	Germany	1:54.58	
56	2	9	Alaa Maso	ERT	1:55.47	
57	2	0	Nikola Ǵuretanoviḱ	North Macedonia	1:55.55	
58	3	3	Mihai Gergely	Romania	1:57.40	
59	1	4	Bernat Lomero	Andorra	2:16.34	
	1	3	Deniel Nankov	Bulgaria	DNS	
	4	2	Andreas Vazaios	Greece	DNS	
	7	9	Alexey Glivinskiy	Israel	DNS	

=== Semifinals ===
The semifinal were started on 20 June at 18:41.
Qualification Rules: The first 2 competitors of each semifinal and the remaining fastest (up to a total of 8 qualified competitors) from the semifinals advance to the final.

Rank	Heat	Lane	Name	Nationality	Time	Notes
1	2	4	David Popovici	Romania	1:46.15	Q
2	2	5	Danas Rapšys	Lithuania	1:46.44	Q
3	2	8	Dimitrios Markos	Greece	1:46.46	Q, NR
4	2	6	Kamil Sieradzki	Poland	1:46.63	Q
5	1	4	Velimir Stjepanović	Serbia	1:47.12	Q
6	1	5	Antonio Djakovic	Switzerland	1:47.31	Q
7	2	7	Konstantinos Englezakis	Greece	1:47.34	Q
8	2	3	Niko Janković	Croatia	1:47.36	Q
9	1	3	Tomas Navikonis	Lithuania	1:47.62	
10	1	2	Robin Hanson	Sweden	1:48.08	
11	2	2	Tomas Koski	Finland	1:48.15	
12	1	6	Bar Soloveychik	Israel	1:48.17	
13	2	1	Oliver Søgaard-Andersen	Denmark	1:48.18	
14	1	8	Sašo Boškan	Slovenia	1:48.22	
15	1	1	Philipp Peschke	Germany	1:48.24	
16	1	7	Romano Yoav	Israel	1:48.45	

=== Final ===
The final was held on 21 June at 18:36.

Rank	Lane	Name	Nationality	Time	Notes
1st place, gold medalist(s)	4	David Popovici	Romania	1:43.13	
2nd place, silver medalist(s)	5	Danas Rapšys	Lithuania	1:45.65	
3rd place, bronze medalist(s)	7	Antonio Djakovic	Switzerland	1:46.32	
4	8	Niko Janković	Croatia	1:46.48	
5	1	Konstantinos Englezakis	Greece	1:46.78	
6	3	Dimitrios Markos	Greece	1:46.89	
7	6	Kamil Sieradzki	Poland	1:47.00	
8	2	Velimir Stjepanović	Serbia	1:47.64	
