= Swimming at the 2026 European Aquatics Championships – Men's 100 metre freestyle =

Men's 100 metre freestyle at the 2026 European Aquatics Championships
- Venue: Paris Aquatic Centre
- Dates: 11 August (heats and semifinals); 12 August (final)
- Competitors: 89 from 34 nations
- Winning time: 46.56

Medalists
gold medal	David Popovici	Romania
silver medal	Egor Kornev
bronze medal	Kristóf Milák	Hungary

The Men's 100 metre freestyle competition of the 2026 European Aquatics Championships was held on 11 and 12 August 2026.

== Records ==
Prior to the competition, the existing world, European and championship records were as follows.

	Name	Nationality	Time	Location	Date
World record	Pan Zhanle	China	46.40	Paris	31 July 2024
European record	David Popovici	Romania	46.51	Singapore	31 July 2025
Championship record	David Popovici	Romania	46.86	Rome	13 August 2022

== Results ==
=== Heats ===
The heats were started on 11 August at 09:38.
Qualification Rules:The 16 fastest from the heats qualify to the semifinals.

Ranks	Heats	Lane	Swimmer	Country	Time	Notes
1	10	4	David Popovici	Romania	47.13	Q
2	10	2	Jere Hribar	Croatia	47.80	Q, NR
3	10	3	Luca Hoek	Spain	47.90	Q
4	8	6	Kristóf Milák	Hungary	47.92	Q
5	9	4	Egor Kornev	Neutral Athletes B	47.97	Q
6	8	3	Carlos D'Ambrosio	Italy	48.02	Q
7	10	6	Sean Niewold	Netherlands	48.05	Q
8	8	5	Nándor Németh	Hungary	48.11	Q
9	9	6	Josha Salchow	Germany	48.35	Q
10	10	1	Aleksandr Shchegolev	Neutral Athletes B	48.36	Q
11	10	5	Matthew Richards	Great Britain	48.37	Q
12	8	1	Vlaho Nenadić	Croatia	48.42	Q
13	9	5	Ivan Giryov	Neutral Athletes B	48.43	
14	7	1	Rémi Fabiani	Luxembourg	48.44	Q
15	9	3	Jacob Mills	Great Britain	48.46	Q
16	8	8	Tomas Navikonis	Lithuania	48.50	Q
17	10	9	Gabriel Shepherd	Great Britain	48.54	
18	5	3	Oliver Søgaard-Andersen	Denmark	48.55	Q, NR
18	9	8	Kamil Sieradzki	Poland	48.55	
20	9	1	Kaii Liam Winkler	Germany	48.56	
21	7	7	Toni Dragoja	Croatia	48.58	
22	8	7	Manuel Frigo	Italy	48.59	
23	7	8	Nikola Aćin	Serbia	48.71	
24	7	3	Ralph Daleiden Ciuferri	Luxembourg	48.72	
25	10	0	Miguel Pérez-Godoy	Spain	48.74	
26	9	0	Robin Hanson	Sweden	48.81	
27	9	7	Patrick Dinu	Romania	48.83	
28	5	4	Vili Sivec	Croatia	48.85	
28	6	2	Ludvig Bartolek	Sweden	48.85	
30	10	8	Andreas Vazaios	Greece	48.86	
31	7	4	Tajus Juška	Lithuania	48.96	
32	6	5	Evan Bailey	Ireland	48.97	
33	7	5	Mateusz Chowaniec	Poland	49.04	
34	8	9	Jacob Whittle	Great Britain	49.08	
35	8	0	Alexey Glivinskiy	Israel	49.09	
35	10	7	Andrey Minakov	Neutral Athletes B	49.09	
37	5	5	Balint Ashton	Switzerland	49.10	
38	9	2	César Castro	Spain	49.14	
39	6	6	Denis Loktev	Israel	49.17	
40	6	7	Brandon van den Berg	Netherlands	49.19	
41	7	2	Sander Kiær Sørensen	Norway	49.23	
42	7	0	Daniel Krichevsky	Israel	49.24	
42	9	9	Alessandro Miressi	Italy	49.24	
44	5	6	Charlie Skoglund Macmillan	Sweden	49.26	
45	7	6	Lorenzo Ballarati	Italy	49.34	
46	3	4	Nikita Sheremet	Ukraine	49.45	
46	5	9	Lukas Edl	Austria	49.45	
46	8	2	Velimir Stjepanović	Serbia	49.45	
49	3	6	Mattia Mauri	Switzerland	49.48	
50	7	9	Frederik Riedel Lentz	Denmark	49.50	
51	6	4	Merlin Belmon	Netherlands	49.51	
52	4	7	Elias Nordeng Refstie	Norway	49.60	
53	3	3	Ronny Brännkärr	Finland	49.63	
54	5	7	Kristupas Trepočka	Lithuania	49.67	
55	4	4	Christian Giefing	Austria	49.68	
56	6	9	Illia Linnyk	Ukraine	49.70	
57	6	8	Heiko Gigler	Austria	49.75	
58	4	3	Eric Andrieș	Romania	49.79	
59	6	0	Roman Fuchs	France	49.81	
60	4	5	Tiago Behar	Switzerland	49.87	
61	3	5	Bjørnar Grytnes Laskerud	Norway	49.88	
62	5	8	Floris Tanis	Netherlands	49.91	
63	4	8	Erik Falk	Sweden	49.95	
64	6	1	Justin Cvetkov	Serbia	49.97	
65	4	1	Jakob Austevoll Harlem	Norway	49.98	
66	1	3	Kenan Dračić	Bosnia and Herzegovina	50.04	
67	3	7	Lars Kuljus	Estonia	50.05	
68	5	2	Ahmet Mete Boylu	Turkey	50.10	
69	4	6	Jakub Jan Krischke	Czech Republic	50.12	
70	3	8	Luukas Vainio	Finland	50.20	
71	3	2	Viktor Kopf	Austria	50.23	
72	4	9	Jānis Deivs Dzirkalis	Latvia	50.33	
73	1	5	Arian Kadić	Bosnia and Herzegovina	50.34	
74	4	0	Siim Kesküla	Estonia	50.45	
74	4	2	Matthew Hamilton	Ireland	50.45	
76	3	1	Nooa Matela	Finland	50.62	
77	5	0	Robin Yeboah	Switzerland	50.67	
78	2	5	Roope Koskela	Finland	50.79	
79	5	1	Martin Kartavi	Israel	50.85	
80	3	0	Miroslav Terziev	Bulgaria	51.24	
81	2	3	Valērijs Čurgelis	Latvia	51.67	
82	2	4	Vasil Tushev	Bulgaria	51.97	
83	3	9	Andrea Poladashvili	Georgia	52.08	
84	2	6	Dmitrijs Tolstihs	Latvia	53.08	
85	2	2	Arion Budima	Kosovo	54.32	
86	2	7	Evghenii Poponin	Moldova	55.22	
87	1	4	Dion Daja	Albania	55.30	
88	2	1	Edlijano Huna	Albania	55.36	
89	2	8	Krasniqi Dior	Kosovo	56.22	
	6	3	Tomas Lukminas	Lithuania	Did not start	
	8	4	Maxime Grousset	France	Did not start	

=== Semifinals ===
The semifinals were started on 11 August at 19:32.

Rank	Heat	Lane	Swimmer	Nation	Time	Notes
1	2	4	David Popovici	Romania	46.72	Q, CR
2	2	5	Luca Hoek	Spain	47.26	Q NR
3	2	3	Egor Kornev	Neutral Athletes B	47.27	Q
4	2	6	Nándor Németh	Hungary	47.44	Q
5	1	3	Carlos D'Ambrosio	Italy	47.70	Q
6	1	1	Tomas Navikonis	Lithuania	47.91	Q, NR
7	1	5	Kristóf Milák	Hungary	47.97	Q
8	1	4	Jere Hribar	Croatia	48.04	Q
9	2	1	Jacob Mills	Great Britain	48.11	
10	1	6	Josha Salchow	Germany	48.28	
11	2	2	Aleksandr Shchegolev	Neutral Athletes B	48.31	
12	2	7	Vlaho Nenadić	Croatia	48.44	
13	2	8	Oliver Søgaard-Andersen	Denmark	48.50	NR
14	1	8	Manuel Frigo	Italy	48.54	
15	1	7	Rémi Fabiani	Luxembourg	48.66	
16	1	2	Matthew Richards	Great Britain	48.88	

=== Final ===
The final was held on 12 August at 18:52.

Rank	Lane	Swimmer	Nation	Time	Notes
1st place, gold medalist(s)	4	David Popovici	Romania	46.56	CR
2nd place, silver medalist(s)	3	Egor Kornev	Neutral Athletes B	46.74	NR
3rd place, bronze medalist(s)	1	Kristóf Milák	Hungary	46.87	
4	5	Luca Hoek	Spain	47.39	
5	8	Jere Hribar	Croatia	47.42	NR
6	6	Nándor Németh	Hungary	47.47	
7	2	Carlos D'Ambrosio	Italy	47.58	
8	7	Tomas Navikonis	Lithuania	47.75	NR
