= Swimming at the 2026 European Aquatics Championships – Men's 4 × 200 metre freestyle relay =

Men's 4 × 200 metre freestyle relay at the 2026 European Aquatics Championships
- Venue: Paris Aquatic Centre
- Dates: 10 August
- Competitors: 88 from 20 nations
- Teams: 20
- Winning time: 7:01.52 CR

Medalists
gold medal	Matthew Richards; Jack McMillan; James Guy; Duncan Scott; Tyler Melbourne-Smith; Thomas Dean; Gabriel Shepherd	Great Britain
silver medal	Léon Marchand; Pierre Largeron; Sauveur Cristofini; Roman Fuchs; Néo Dutriaux	France
bronze medal	Lukas Märtens; Timo Sorgius; Jarno Baschnitt; Cornelius Jahn	Germany

The Men's 4 × 200 metre freestyle relay competition of the 2026 European Aquatics Championships was held on 10 August 2026.

== Records ==
The existing records at the beginning of the competition were as follows.

Record	Time	Nation	Location	Date
World record	6:58.55	United States	(Italy) Rome	31 Jul 2009
European record	6:58.58	Great Britain	(Japan) Tokyo	28 Jul 2021
Championships record	7:03.48	Russia	(Hungary) Budapest	19 May 2021

The following records were set during the competition .

Record	Time	Nation	Location	Date
Championships record	7:01.52	Great Britain	Paris (France)	10 August 2026
National records	7:02.23	France	Paris (France)	10 August 2026
National records	7:02.28	Germany	Paris (France)	10 August 2026
National records	7:03.53	Lithuania	Paris (France)	10 August 2026
National records	7:08.15	Greece	Paris (France)	10 August 2026

== Results ==
=== Heats ===
The heats were started at 11:25.

Rank	Heat	Lane	Nation	Swimmers	Time	Notes
1	1	3	Germany	Lukas Märtens (1:45.84); Timo Sorgius (1:46.33); Jarno Baschnitt (1:46.17); Cornelius Jahn (1:46.49)	7:04.83	Q
2	2	7	Great Britain	Tyler Melbourne-Smith (1:47.16); Jack McMillan (1:45.40); Thomas Dean (1:45.69); Gabriel Shepherd (1:46.82)	7:05.07	Q
3	2	1	Lithuania	Tomas Lukminas (1:47.46); Danas Rapšys (1:46.27); Tomas Navikonis (1:45.64); Kristupas Trepočka (1:46.56)	7:05.93	Q, NR
4	2	6	Israel	Denis Loktev (1:47.02); Eitan Ben Shitrit (1:46.70); Alexey Glivinskiy (1:46.85); Daniel Krichevsky (1:46.14)	7:06.71	Q
5	1	7	Neutral Athletes B	Mikhail Shcherbakov (1:47.25); Grigorii Vekovishchev (1:45.51); Andrei Cherepkov (1:47.81); Roman Akimov (1:47.15)	7:07.72	Q
6	2	5	Italy	Filippo Megli (1:47.53); Alessandro Ragaini (1:48.01); Jacopo Barbotti (1:46.86); Marco De Tullio (1:46.33)	7:08.73	Q
7	1	5	France	Roman Fuchs (1:47.16); Pierre Largeron (1:47.23); Néo Dutriaux (1:48.62); Sauveur Cristofini (1:46.32)	7:09.33	Q
8	1	0	Greece	Dimitrios Markos (1:46.90); Konstantinos Englezakis (1:47.97); Konstantinos Stamou (1:47.49); Andreas Vazaios (1:47.17)	7:09.53	Q
9	2	3	Sweden	Robin Hanson (1:46.71); Ludvig Bartolek (1:46.65); Victor Johansson (1:47.46); Charlie Skoglund (1:49.20)	7:10.02	NR
10	1	6	Spain	Miguel Pérez-Godoy (1:48.00); César Castro (1:48.06); Ian Florencio (1:49.08); Carlos Garach (1:46.44)	7:11.58	
11	2	2	Ireland	Evan Bailey (1:47.44); John Shortt (1:48.23); Cormac Rynn (1:49.15); Daniel Wiffen (1:48.17)	7:12.99	
12	2	8	Switzerland	Antonio Djakovic (1:47.17); Balint Ashton (1:50.37); Mattia Mauri (1:47.44); Tiago Behar (1:50.08)	7:15.06	
13	2	4	Slovakia	Samuel Košťál (1:47.26) NR; František Jablčník (1:50.25); Milan Vojtko (1:49.08); Jakub Poliačik (1:49.67)	7:16.26	NR
14	2	9	Croatia	Niko Janković (1:48.40); Franko Grgić (1:48.48); Karlo Perčinić (1:49.47); Filip Mujan (1:50.22)	7:16.57	
15	1	2	Finland	Tomas Koski (1:47.25); Ronny Brännkärr (1:49.74); Luukas Vainio (1:48.60); Ajjuub Ezzat (1:51.26)	7:16.85	
16	1	1	Bulgaria	Petar Mitsin (1:48.39); Miroslav Terziev (1:51.76); Daren Kirilov (1:48.56); Vasil Tushev (1:49.27)	7:17.98	
17	1	4	Turkey	Ahmet Mete Boylu (1:48.73); Mehmet Ege Koçak (1:48.35); Berke Saka (1:49.23); Taylan Uygur (1:52.51)	7:18.82	
18	1	8	Norway	Sander Kiær Sørensen (1:48.31); Oskar Farkas (1:50.32); Birk Lee Johansen (1:52.18); Henrik Christiansen (1:50.71)	7:21.52	NR
19	2	0	Faroe Islands	Ísak Dag Brisenfeldt (1:52.69); Heini Mohr Askam (1:55.79); Silas Dam Lindberg (1:58.55); Líggjas Joensen (1:51.48)	7:38.51	
20	1	9	Moldova	Constantin Malachi (2:05.75); Denis Svet (2:03.35); Evghenii Poponin (2:14.06); Denis Bedzhanian (1:58.13)	8:21.29	

=== Final ===
The final was held at 19:33.

Rank	Lane	Nation	Swimmers	Time	Notes
1st place, gold medalist(s)	5	Great Britain	Matthew Richards (1:45.44); Jack McMillan (1:46.62); James Guy (1:44.07); Duncan Scott (1:45.39)	7:01.52	CR
2nd place, silver medalist(s)	1	France	Léon Marchand (1:43.76); Pierre Largeron (1:47.44); Sauveur Cristofini (1:45.28); Roman Fuchs (1:45.75)	7:02.23	NR
3rd place, bronze medalist(s)	4	Germany	Lukas Märtens (1:45.71); Timo Sorgius (1:45.63); Jarno Baschnitt (1:45.10); Cornelius Jahn (1:45.84)	7:02.28	NR
4	7	Italy	Carlos D'Ambrosio (1:44.72) NR; Marco De Tullio (1:46.35); Jacopo Barbotti (1:45.89); Filippo Megli (1:45.86)	7:02.82	
5	3	Lithuania	Danas Rapšys (1:45.62); Tomas Navikonis (1:45.45); Kristupas Trepočka (1:47.16); Tajus Juška (1:45.30)	7:03.53	NR
6	2	Neutral Athletes B	Mikhail Shcherbakov (1:46.36); Grigorii Vekovishchev (1:45.82); Ivan Giryov (1:45.50); Roman Akimov (1:46.18)	7:03.86	
7	6	Israel	Denis Loktev (1:45.59); Eitan Ben Shitrit (1:47.01); Yoav Romano (1:47.25); Daniel Krichevsky (1:47.70)	7:07.55	
8	8	Greece	Dimitrios Markos (1:44.93); Konstantinos Englezakis (1:47.81); Konstantinos Stamou (1:47.57); Andreas Vazaios (1:47.84)	7:08.15	NR
