= Swimming at the 2024 European Aquatics Championships – Men's 4 × 100 metre freestyle relay =

Men's 4 × 100 metre freestyle relay at the 2024 European Aquatics Championships
- Venue: Sports Centre Milan Gale Muškatirović
- Dates: 20 June (heats and final)
- Competitors: 73 from 18 nations
- Teams: 18
- Winning time: 3:12.90

Medalists
gold medal	Velimir Stjepanović; Nikola Aćin; Justin Cvetkov; Andrej Barna	Serbia
silver medal	Mateusz Chowaniec; Dominik Dudys; Ksawery Masiuk; Kamil Sieradzki; Bartosz Piszczorowicz; Paweł Korzeniowski	Poland
bronze medal	Apostolos Christou; Stergios Marios; Kristian Gkolomeev; Andreas Vazaios; Odyssefs Meladinis; Evangelos Makrygiannis	Greece

The Men's 4 × 100 metre freestyle relay competition of the 2024 European Aquatics Championships was held on 20 June 2024.

== Records ==
Before the competition, the existing world, European and championship records were as follows.

	Team	Time	Location	Date
World record	United States	3:08.24	Beijing	11 August 2008
European record	France	3:08.32	Beijing	11 August 2008
Championship record	Russia	3:10.41	Budapest	17 May 2021

== Results ==
=== Heats ===
The heats were started at 10:28.
Qualification Rules: The 8 fastest from the heats qualify to the final.

Rank	Heat	Lane	Nation	Swimmers	Time	Notes
1	1	7	Serbia	Velimir Stjepanović (48.59); Nikola Aćin (48.40); Justin Cvetkov (49.40); Andrej Barna (47.08)	3:13.47	Q
2	2	1	Croatia	Nikola Miljenic (48.67); Jere Hribar (48.12); Vili Sivec (49.38); Toni Dragoja (48.96)	3:15.13	Q
3	2	6	Romania	Patrick-Sebastian Dinu (49.05); Alexandru-Richard Szilagyi (49.63); Mihai Gergely (49.86); David Popovici (46.66)	3:15.20	Q
4	1	4	Germany	Peter Varjasi (49.05); Ole Mats Eidam (48.60); Martin Wrede (48.74); Björn Kammann (48.85)	3:15.24	Q
5	2	3	Greece	Andreas Vazaios (49.26); Stergios Marios (48.56); Odyssefs Meladinis (48.61); Evangelos Makrygiannis (49.16)	3:15.59	Q
6	2	8	Poland	Dominik Dudys (49.11); Bartosz Piszczorowicz (48.91); Paweł Korzeniowski (49.04); Mateusz Chowaniec (48.59)	3:15.65	Q
7	1	2	Sweden	Björn Seeliger (49.71); Elias Persson (48.86); Isak Eliasson (49.46); Marcus Holmquist (49.41)	3:17.44	Q
8	1	1	Israel	Alexey Glivinskiy (49.76); Ron Polonsky (49.33); Martin Kartavi (49.26); Denis Loktev (49.29)	3:17.64	Q
9	1	5	Denmark	Frederik Lentz (49.26); Oliver Søgaard-Andersen (48.83); William Textor-Broch (50.48); Rasmus Nickelsen (49.13)	3:17.70	
10	1	6	Austria	Heiko Gigler (48.52); Leon Opatril (49.85); Lukas Edl (50.10); Alexander Trampitsch (49.56)	3:18.03	
11	1	0	Great Britain	Edward Mildred (49.89); Calvin Fry (49.60); Alexander Painter (49.30); Matthew Ward (49.69)	3:18.48	
12	1	3	Estonia	Lars Kuljus (49.49); Kregor Zirk (49.70); Daniel Zaitsev (49.87); Alex Ahtiainen (50.07)	3:19.13	
13	2	9	Bulgaria	Kaloyan Bratanov (49.06); Deniel Nankov (49.67); Yordan Yanchev (49.79); Kaloyan Levterov (50.89)	3:19.41	NR
14	1	8	Luxembourg	Ralph Daleiden Ciuferri (48.86); Rémi Fabiani (48.65); Joao Reisen Braga Soares Carneiro (51.90); Finn Murray Moses Kemp (50.66)	3:20.07	NR
15	2	2	Finland	Kalle Makinen (50.24); Ronny Brannkarr (50.07); Davin Lindholm (51.32); Ari-Pekka Liukkonen (50.61)	3:22.24	
16	2	7	Latvia	Kristaps Mikelsons (50.92); Jegors Mihailovs (52.21); Staņislavs Šakels (51.65); Reds Rullis (50.33)	3:25.11	
17	2	5	Albania	Zhulian Lavdaniti (53.04); Paolo Priska (52.48); Grisi Koxhaku (53.58); Even Qarri (58.70)	3:37.80	NR
	2	4	Hungary	Dániel Mészáros (49.20); Boldizsár Magda (49.32); Bence Szabados (48.64); Ádám Jászó	Disqualified	
	2	0	Switzerland	DNS		

=== Final ===
The final was held at 19:45.

Rank	Lane	Nation	Swimmers	Time	Notes
1st place, gold medalist(s)	4	Serbia	Velimir Stjepanović (47.99); Nikola Aćin (48.64); Justin Cvetkov (49.41); Andrej Barna (46.86)	3:12.90	
2nd place, silver medalist(s)	7	Poland	Mateusz Chowaniec (48.45); Dominik Dudys (48.60); Ksawery Masiuk (48.04); Kamil Sieradzki (48.16)	3:13.25	NR
3rd place, bronze medalist(s)	2	Greece	Apostolos Christou (48.82); Stergios Marios (48.50); Kristian Gkolomeev (48.04); Andreas Vazaios (48.37)	3:13.73	
4	5	Croatia	Nikola Miljenic (48.94); Jere Hribar (47.77); Vili Sivec (49.09); Toni Dragoja (48.11)	3:13.91	
5	3	Romania	David Popovici (47.22); George-Adrian Ratiu (49.48); Alexandru-Richard Szilagyi (49.49); Patrick-Sebastian Dinu (47.83)	3:14.02	
6	6	Germany	Martin Wrede (48.75); Peter Varjasi (48.15); Björn Kammann (49.03); Ole Mats Eidam (48.63)	3:14.56	
7	8	Israel	Martin Kartavi (49.89); Ron Polonsky (49.40); Alexey Glivinskiy (48.60); Denis Loktev (49.25)	3:17.14	
8	1	Sweden	Björn Seeliger (49.98); Elias Persson (48.87); Marcus Holmquist (49.49); Isak Eliasson (49.38)	3:17.72	
