= Swimming at the 2024 Summer Olympics – Men's 4 × 200-metre freestyle relay =

Men's 4 × 200 metre freestyle relay at the Games of the XXXIII Olympiad
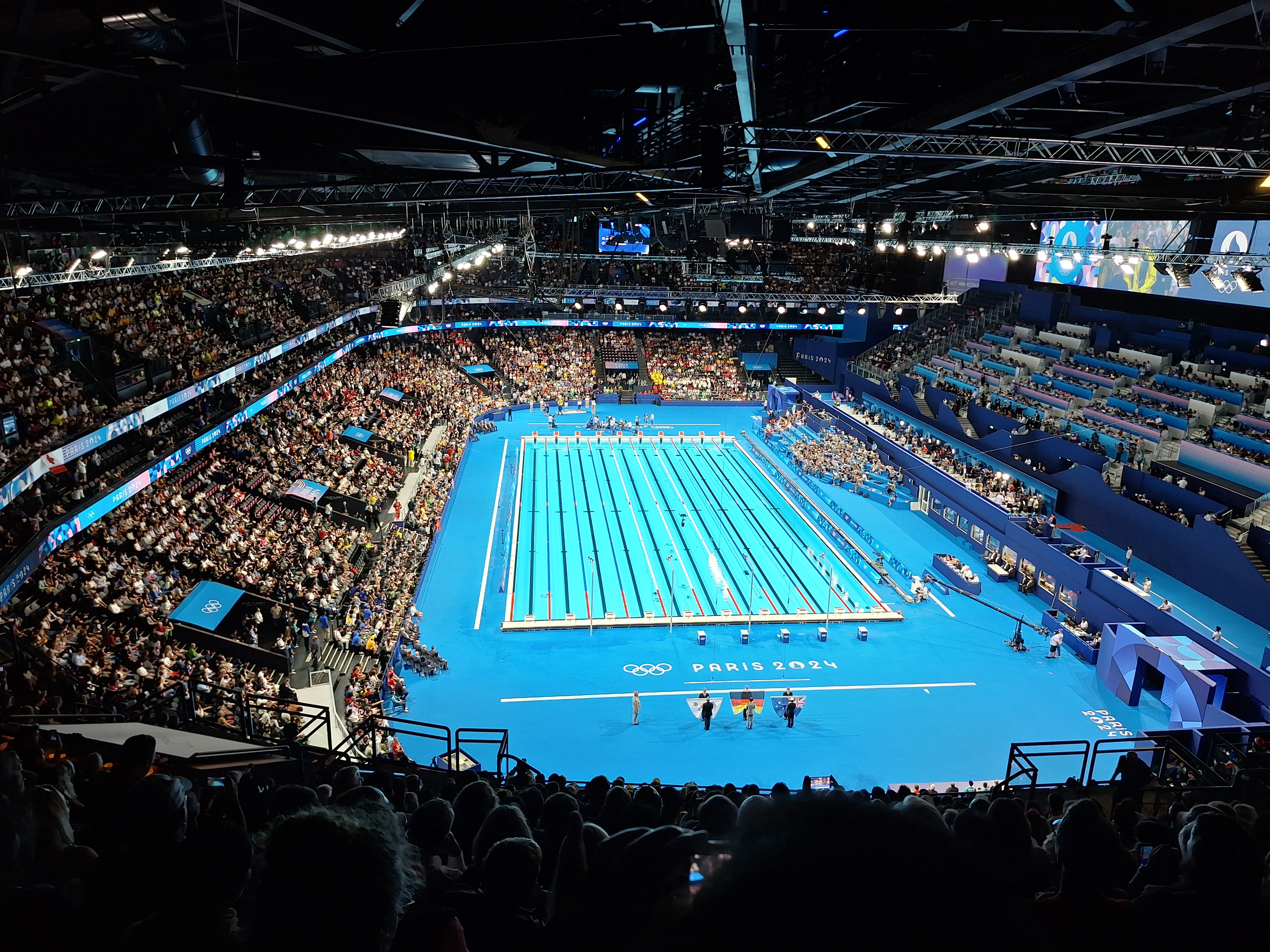
- Paris La Défense Arena after it was converted to a swimming pool for the swimming events
- Venue: Paris La Défense Arena
- Dates: 30 July 2024 (heats and final)
- Competitors: 75 from 16 nations
- Teams: 16 teams
- Winning time: 6:59.43

Medalists
1st place, gold medalist(s)		James Guy, Tom Dean, Matt Richards, Duncan Scott, Jack McMillan*, Kieran Bird*	Great Britain
2nd place, silver medalist(s)		Luke Hobson, Carson Foster, Drew Kibler, Kieran Smith, Brooks Curry*, Blake Pieroni*, Chris Guiliano*	United States
3rd place, bronze medalist(s)		Maximillian Giuliani, Flynn Southam, Elijah Winnington, Thomas Neill, Kai Taylor*, Zac Incerti* *Indicates the swimmer only competed in the preliminary heats.	Australia

The men's 4 × 200 metre freestyle relay event at the 2024 Summer Olympics was held on 30 July 2024 at Paris La Défense Arena, which was converted to a swimming pool for the swimming events.

Great Britain were considered the most likely to win the event, with the US, South Korea, Australia and China also likely to win medals. In the heats (preliminary rounds), all of those teams qualified, while Israel's quartet beat and lowered their country's national record.

In the final, Great Britain and the United States swam closely to each other for most of the race, and Great Britain won gold with a time of 6:59.43. The US finished second with 7:00.78 and Australia finished third with 7:01.98. The quartet's win made them the first British team to win a relay event at consecutive Olympics in swimming or athletics.

== Background ==
Team Great Britain won the event at the previous Olympics, and the same four swimmers from the previous Olympics were returning to defend their title: Matt Richards, Duncan Scott, Tom Dean and James Guy. The quartet also won the event at the 2023 World Championships, and had the fastest sum of personal best splits at 6:58.06. The second fastest sum of personal bests belonged to the US, who added up to 6:58.66, and the third fastest sum belonged to South Korea, at 7:00.99. Other medal contenders included Australia and China.

Both SwimSwam and Swimming World predicted Great Britain would win and the US would come second. SwimSwam predicted South Korea would come third while Swimming World predicted Australia would take the bronze.

The event was held at Paris La Défense Arena, which was converted to a swimming pool for the swimming events.

== Qualification ==
Each National Olympic Committee could enter one team, and there were a total of sixteen qualifications places available. The first three qualifying places were taken by the podium finishers at the 2023 World Championships, and the final thirteen qualifying places were allocated to the fastest performances at the 2023 and 2024 World Championships.

== Heats ==
Two heats (preliminary rounds) took place on 30 July 2024, starting at 13:20. (Note: All times are Central European Summer Time (UTC+2)) The teams with the best eight times in the heats advanced to the final. The US won the first heat with the second fastest qualifying time of 7:05.57, while Great Britain won the second heat with the fastest qualifying time of 7:05.11. France, Australia, Germany, China, South Korea, Japan and Israel also all qualified, with Israel beating and lowering their national record to 7:08.43.

Results
Rank	Heat	Lane	Nation	Swimmers	Time	Notes
1	2	4	Great Britain	James Guy (1:45.04); Jack McMillan (1:45.68); Kieran Bird (1:47.68); Tom Dean (1:46.71)	7:05.11	Q
2	1	4	United States	Drew Kibler (1:46.43); Brooks Curry (1:45.96); Blake Pieroni (1:46.44); Chris Guiliano (1:46.74)	7:05.57	Q
3	1	3	France	Hadrien Salvan (1:47.80); Wissam-Amazigh Yebba (1:46.04); Yann Le Goff (1:46.55); Roman Fuchs (1:45.22)	7:05.61	Q
4	2	3	Australia	Kai Taylor (1:47.60); Zac Incerti (1:47.05); Flynn Southam (1:45.62); Thomas Neill (1:45.36)	7:05.63	Q
5	1	6	Germany	Lukas Märtens (1:45.66); Rafael Miroslaw (1:46.35); Josha Salchow (1:46.18); Timo Sorgius (1:48.01)	7:06.20	Q
6	2	5	China	Ji Xinjie (1:46.59); Niu Guangsheng (1:48.43); Fei Liwei (1:46.57); Zhang Zhanshuo (1:46.13)	7:07.72	Q
7	1	5	South Korea	Lee Ho-joon (1:46.53); Lee Yoo-yeon (1:47.58); Kim Yeong-hyeon (1:48.26); Kim Woo-min (1:45.59)	7:07.96	Q
8	1	2	Japan	Tatsuya Murasa (1:47.30); Katsuhiro Matsumoto (1:45.77); Hidenari Mano (1:48.09); Konosuke Yanagimoto (1:47.27)	7:08.43	Q
8	1	7	Israel	Denis Loktev (1:47.32); Bar Soloveychik (1:47.53); Eitan Ben-Shitrit (1:48.01); Gal Cohen Groumi (1:45.57)	7:08.43	Q, NR
10	2	6	Italy	Giovanni Caserta (1:46.85); Alessandro Ragaini (1:48.08); Carlos D'Ambrosio (1:47.24); Filippo Megli (1:46.46)	7:08.63	
11	2	7	Greece	Dimitrios Markos (1:47.66); Konstantinos Englezakis (1:46.71); Konstantinos Stamou (1:48.00); Andreas Vazaios (1:47.23)	7:09.60	
12	2	2	Brazil	Murilo Sartori (1:48.56); Fernando Scheffer (1:46.76); Eduardo Oliveira de Moraes (1:48.53); Guilherme Costa (1:46.41)	7:10.26	
13	1	1	Spain	César Castro (1:46.84); Luis Domínguez (1:46.82); Carlos Garach (1:48.40); Ferran Julià Tous (1:49.56)	7:11.62	
14	2	8	Canada	Patrick Hussey (1:47.83); Alex Axon (1:47.57); Jeremy Bagshaw (1:48.10); Lorne Wigginton (1:48.57)	7:12.07	
15	2	1	Lithuania	Tomas Navikonis (1:47.08); Danas Rapšys (1:46.29); Tomas Lukminas (1:47.30); Andrius Šidlauskas (1:55.94)	7:16.61	
16	1	8	Switzerland	Antonio Djakovic (1:47.97); Nils Liess (1:49.95); Jérémy Desplanches (1:49.24); Tiago Behar (1:50.90)	7:18.06	

== Final ==
The final took place at 22:15 on 30 July. Great Britain and the United States swam closely to each other for most of the race, each switching between first and second. Great Britain led at all the exchanges, and Duncan Scott swam the fastest individual portion of the race (1:43.95) to win Great Britain the gold medal with a time of 6:59.43. The US finished second with 7:00.78, Australia finished third with 7:01.98 and China finished fourth with 7:04.37.

The quartet's win made them the first British team to win a relay event at consecutive Olympics in swimming or athletics, and they became the first team of any nationality to win the event in consecutive Olympic Games with the same four final swimmers.

Results
Rank	Lane	Nation	Swimmers	Time
1st place, gold medalist(s)	4	Great Britain	James Guy (1:45.09); Tom Dean (1:45.28); Matt Richards (1:45.11); Duncan Scott (1:43.95)	6:59.43
2nd place, silver medalist(s)	5	United States	Luke Hobson (1:45.55); Carson Foster (1:45.31); Drew Kibler (1:45.12); Kieran Smith (1:44.80)	7:00.78
3rd place, bronze medalist(s)	6	Australia	Maximillian Giuliani (1:45.99); Flynn Southam (1:45.53); Elijah Winnington (1:45.19); Thomas Neill (1:45.27)	7:01.98
4	7	China	Ji Xinjie (1:47.14); Fei Liwei (1:46.05); Pan Zhanle (1:45.81); Zhang Zhanshuo (1:45.37)	7:04.37
5	3	France	Wissam-Amazigh Yebba (1:46.72); Hadrien Salvan (1:46.75); Yann Le Goff (1:45.63); Roman Fuchs (1:45.70)	7:04.80
6	1	South Korea	Yang Jae-hoon (1:49.84); Lee Ho-joon (1:46.45); Kim Woo-min (1:44.98); Hwang Sun-woo (1:45.99)	7:07.26
7	8	Japan	Tatsuya Murasa (1:46.69); Katsuhiro Matsumoto (1:45.31); Hidenari Mano (1:47.36); Konosuke Yanagimoto (1:48.12)	7:07.48
8	2	Germany	Lukas Märtens (1:45.31); Rafael Miroslaw (1:46.32); Timo Sorgius (1:49.18); Josha Salchow (1:48.75)	7:09.56
9	0	Israel	Denis Loktev (1:48.16); Gal Cohen Groumi (1:46.25); Tomer Frankel (1:47.71); Bar Soloveychik (1:48.10)	7:10.22
