= Swimming at the 2024 European Aquatics Championships – Men's 4 × 200 metre freestyle relay =

Men's 4 × 200 metre freestyle relay at the 2024 European Aquatics Championships
- Venue: Sports Centre Milan Gale Muškatirović
- Dates: 17 June
- Competitors: 52 from 12 nations
- Teams: 12
- Winning time: 7:08.04

Medalists
gold medal	Tomas Navikonis; Tomas Lukminas; Kristupas Trepočka; Danas Rapšys; Rokas Jazdauskas	Lithuania
silver medal	Nándor Németh; Balázs Holló; Richárd Márton; Hubert Kós; Attila Kovács; Boldizsár Magda	Hungary
bronze medal	Dimitrios Markos; Konstantinos Englezakis; Konstantinos Stamou; Andreas Vazaios	Greece

The Men's 4 × 200 metre freestyle relay competition of the 2024 European Aquatics Championships was held on 17 June 2024.

== Records ==
Before the competition, the existing world, European and championship records were as follows.

	Team	Time	Location	Date
World record	United States	6:58.55	Rome	31 July 2009
European record	Great Britain	6:58.58	Tokyo	28 July 2021
Championship record	Russia	7:03.48	Eindhoven	19 May 2021

== Results ==
=== Heats ===
The heats were held at 10:43.

Rank	Heat	Lane	Nation	Swimmers	Time	Notes
1	2	4	Lithuania	Tomas Navikonis (1:47.43); Tomas Lukminas (1:46.90); Kristupas Trepočka (1:47.52); Rokas Jazdauskas (1:47.90)	7:09.75	Q, NR
2	2	2	Israel	Eitan Ben Shitrit (1:48.51); Bar Soloveychik (1:46.73); Romano Yoav (1:48.20); Gal Cohen Groumi (1:48.09)	7:11.53	Q
3	3	6	Hungary	Richárd Márton (1:48.37); Hubert Kós (1:47.67); Attila Kovács (1:49.86); Boldizsár Magda (1:50.20)	7:16.10	Q
4	1	2	Germany	Danny Schmidt (1:48.54); Marius Zobel (1:50.72); Philipp Peschke (1:47.76); Jarno Bachnitt (1:49.20)	7:16.22	Q
5	2	7	Croatia	Niko Janković (1:48.03) NR; Vili Sivec (1:48.75); Marin Mogić (1:50.43); Karlo Perčinić (1:49.02)	7:16.23	Q, NR
6	2	3	Greece	Andreas Vazaios (1:50.01); Konstantinos Englezakis (1:50.67); Konstantinos Stamou (1:49.41); Dimitrios Markos (1:48.33)	7:18.42	Q
7	1	6	Ireland	Finn McGeever (1:50.76); Evan Bailey (1:48.50); Jack Cassin (1:50.21); Cormac Rynn (1:49.24)	7:18.71	Q
8	1	7	Bulgaria	Yordan Yanchev (1:49.78); Deniel Nankov (1:49.05); Kaloyan Levterov (1:50.88); Kaloyan Bratanov (1:49.49)	7:19.20	Q
9	1	5	Slovenia	Sašo Boškan (1:48.58); Arne Furlan Štular (1:52.00); Primož Šenica Pavletič (1:52.43); Jaka Pušnik (1:51.61)	7:24.62	
10	1	4	Switzerland	Tiago Behar (1:51.17); Jérémy Desplanches (1:52.10); Marius Toscan (1:51.27); Gian-Luca Gartmann (1:50.91)	7:25.45	
11	1	3	Latvia	Kristaps Miķelsons (1:51.34); Jegors Mihailovs (1:55.63); Ronens Kermans (1:54.63); Reds Rullis (1:51.74)	7:33.34	NR
12	2	5	Moldova	Pavel Alovatki (1:54.09); Egor Covaliov (1:55.35); Constantin Malachi (2:02.36); Denis Svet (2:01.33)	7:53.13	

=== Final ===
The final was held at 19:04.

Rank	Lane	Nation	Swimmers	Time	Notes
1st place, gold medalist(s)	4	Lithuania	Tomas Navikonis (1:47.42); Tomas Lukminas (1:47.66); Kristupas Trepočka (1:48.06); Danas Rapšys (1:44.90)	7:08.04	NR
2nd place, silver medalist(s)	3	Hungary	Nándor Németh (1:46.11); Balázs Holló (1:48.09); Richárd Márton (1:47.63); Hubert Kós (1:47.76)	7:09.59	
3rd place, bronze medalist(s)	7	Greece	Dimitrios Markos (1:47.12); Konstantinos Englezakis (1:46.60); Konstantinos Stamou (1:48.61); Andreas Vazaios (1:47.40)	7:09.73	
4	5	Israel	Denis Loktev (1:48.81); Bar Soloveychik (1:46.74); Eitan Ben Shitrit (1:47.17); Gal Cohen Groumi (1:47.20)	7:09.92	
5	6	Germany	Danny Schmidt (1:48.92); Philipp Peschke (1:47.46); Jarno Bachnitt (1:48.23); Marius Zobel (1:49.34)	7:13.95	
6	2	Croatia	Niko Janković (1:47.31) NR; Vili Sivec (1:48.45); Marin Mogić (1:50.74); Karlo Perčinić (1:49.72)	7:16.22	NR
7	1	Ireland	Evan Bailey (1:48.72); Finn McGeever (1:49.68); Cormac Rynn (1:49.94); Jack Cassin (1:49.63)	7:17.97	
8	8	Bulgaria	Yordan Yanchev (1:49.03); Deniel Nankov (1:52.31); Kaloyan Levterov (1:53.20); Kaloyan Bratanov (1:57.53)	7:32.07	
