= List of Spanish records in swimming =

This is a list of national swimming records for Spain. These are the fastest times ever swum by a swimmer representing the country.

These records are kept by Spain's national swimming federation: Royal Spanish Swimming Federation (RFEN).

Information listed here is based on an update published August 19, 2013. A listing of the records can be found on the RFEN website here.

== Long course (50 m) ==
=== Men ===
| Event | Time | | Name | Club | Date | Meet | Location | Ref |
|---|---|---|---|---|---|---|---|---|
| 50 m freestyle | 21.93 | | Luca Hoek | C.N. Terrassa | 12 March 2026 | Spanish Open Championships | Sabadell, Spain | |
| 100 m freestyle | 47.26 | sf | Luca Hoek | Spain | 11 August 2026 | European Championships | Paris, France | |
| 200 m freestyle | 1:46.10 | | Luca Hoek | CN Terrassa | 28 June 2026 | Spanish Championships | Palma de Mallorca, Spain | |
| 400 m freestyle | 3:47.29 | | Carlos Garach | C.N. Churriana | 22 June 2024 | Spanish Championships | Palma de Mallorca, Spain | |
| 800 m freestyle | 7:45.41 | | Carlos Garach | Spain | 12 August 2026 | European Championships | Paris, France | |
| 1500 m freestyle | 14:57.23 | | Carlos Garach | C.N. Churriana | 29 March 2023 | Spanish Championships | Palma de Mallorca, Spain | |
| 50 m backstroke | 24.40 | sf | Iván Martínez | Spain | 13 August 2026 | European Championships | Paris, France | |
| 100 m backstroke | 52.38 | r | Aschwin Wildeboer | Spain | 1 July 2009 | Mediterranean Games | Pescara, Italy | |
| 200 m backstroke | 1:54.51 | | Hugo González | Real Canoe NC | 20 June 2024 | Spanish Championships | Palma de Mallorca, Spain | |
| 50 m breaststroke | 27.30 | h | Nil Cadevall | C.N. Sant Andreu | 27 June 2026 | Spanish Championships | Palma de Mallorca, Spain | |
| 100 m breaststroke | 1:00.30 | | Nil Cadevall | C.N. Sant Andreu | 28 June 2026 | Spanish Championships | Palma de Mallorca, Spain | |
| 200 m breaststroke | 2:08.49 | sf | Carles Coll | Spain | 31 July 2025 | World Championships | Singapore, Singapore | |
| 50 m butterfly | 22.43 | sf | Rafael Muñoz | Navial | 5 April 2009 | Spanish Championships | Málaga, Spain | |
| 100 m butterfly | 50.41 | | Rafael Muñoz | Spain | 1 August 2009 | World Championships | Rome, Italy | |
| 200 m butterfly | 1:54.97 | | Arbidel Gonzalez | Spain | 15 August 2026 | European Championships | Paris, France | |
| 200m individual medley | 1:54.44 | | Hugo González | Spain | 16 August 2026 | European Championships | Paris, France | |
| 400m individual medley | 4:12.67 | h | Joan Lluís Pons | Spain | 24 July 2021 | Olympic Games | Tokyo, Japan | |
| 4×100m freestyle relay | 3:11.91 | | Luca Hoek (47.47); César Castro (48.22); Miguel Perez-Godoy (48.12); Sergio de Celis (48.10) | Spain | 13 August 2026 | European Championships | Paris, France | |
| 4×200m freestyle relay | 7:10.63 | h | Luis Dominguez (1:47.02); César Castro (1:46.06); Sergio de Celis (1:48.27); Carlos Quijada (1:49.28) | Spain | 16 February 2024 | World Championships | Doha, Qatar | |
| 4×100m medley relay | 3:32.11 | h | Aschwin Wildeboer (52.70); Melquíades Álvarez (59.15); Rafael Muñoz (50.52); José Antonio Alonso (49.74) | Spain | 2 August 2009 | World Championships | Rome, Italy | |

Legend: # – Record awaiting ratification by RFEN; WR – World record; ER – European record; e – equalled existing record;
Records not set in finals: h – heat; sf – semifinal; r – relay 1st leg; rh – relay heat 1st leg; b – B final; † – en route to final mark; so – swim-off; tt – time trial

=== Women ===
| Event | Time | | Name | Club | Date | Meet | Location | Ref |
|---|---|---|---|---|---|---|---|---|
| 50m freestyle | 24.79 | | Lidón Muñoz | C.N. Sant Andreu | 26 July 2024 | Catalonia International Open | Terrassa, Spain | |
| 100m freestyle | 53.97 | sf | María Daza | Spain | 10 August 2026 | European Championships | Paris, France | |
| 200m freestyle | 1:56.19 | sf | Melani Costa | Spain | 30 July 2013 | World Championships | Barcelona, Spain | |
| 400m freestyle | 4:02.47 | | Melani Costa | Spain | 28 July 2013 | World Championships | Barcelona, Spain | |
| 800m freestyle | 8:18.55 | | Mireia Belmonte | Spain | 12 August 2016 | Olympic Games | Rio de Janeiro, Brazil | |
| 1500m freestyle | 15:50.89 | | Mireia Belmonte | Spain | 25 July 2017 | World Championships | Budapest, Hungary | |
| 50m backstroke | 27.71 | sf | Mercedes Peris | Spain | 31 July 2013 | World Championships | Barcelona, Spain | |
| 100m backstroke | 58.83 | h | Carmen Weiler | Real Canoe N.C. | 11 June 2025 | Spanish Championships | Palma de Mallorca, Spain | |
| 200m backstroke | 2:08.03 | h | Estella Tonrath | C.N. Palma de Mallorca | 13 June 2025 | Spanish Championships | Palma de Mallorca, Spain | |
| 50m breaststroke | 30.47 | sf | María Ramos Najji | Spain | 15 August 2026 | European Championships | Paris, France | |
| 100m breaststroke | 1:06.44 | | Jessica Vall | C.N. Sant Andreu | 14 April 2017 | Spanish Championships | Pontevedra, Spain | |
| 200m breaststroke | 2:22.56 | | Jessica Vall | Spain | 20 May 2016 | European Championships | London, Great Britain | |
| 50m butterfly | 26.35 | sf | Carlota Rodriguez Alcaide | Spain | 11 July 2026 | European Junior Championships | Munich, Germany | |
| 100m butterfly | 58.48 | | Paula Juste | C.N. Lleida | 18 June 2024 | Spanish Championships | Palma de Mallorca, Spain | |
| 200m butterfly | 2:04.78 | | Mireia Belmonte | Spain | 1 August 2013 | World Championships | Barcelona, Spain | |
| 200m individual medley | 2:09.45 | | Mireia Belmonte | Spain | 29 July 2013 | World Championships | Barcelona, Spain | |
| 400m individual medley | 4:31.21 | | Mireia Belmonte | Spain | 4 August 2013 | World Championships | Barcelona, Spain | |
| 4×100m freestyle relay | 3:38.19 | | María Daza (54.10); Irene Ciercoles (53.46); Ainhoa Campabadal (54.67); Naiara Sobreviela (55.96) | Spain | 12 August 2026 | European Championships | Paris, France | |
| 4×200m freestyle relay | 7:53.20 | | Melani Costa (1:56.50); Patricia Castro (1:59.06); Mireia Belmonte (1:58.56); Beatriz Gómez Cortés (1:59.08) | Spain | 1 August 2013 | World Championships | Barcelona, Spain | |
| 4×100m medley relay | 4:00.25 | | Irene Ciercoles (1:00.22); Alba Vázquez (1:07.68); Laura Cabanes (58.71); María Daza (53.64) | Spain | 16 August 2026 | European Championships | Paris, France | |

Legend: # – Record awaiting ratification by RFEN; WR – World record; ER – European record; e – equalled existing record;
Records not set in finals: h – heat; sf – semifinal; r – relay 1st leg; rh – relay heat 1st leg; b – B final; † – en route to final mark; so – swim-off; tt – time trial

=== Mixed relay ===
| Event | Time | | Name | Club | Date | Meet | Location | Ref |
|---|---|---|---|---|---|---|---|---|
| 4×100 m freestyle relay | 3:22.91 | | Luca Hoek (47.56); Miguel Perez-Godoy (47.81); Maria Daza (53.50); Irene Ciercoles (54.04) | Spain | 14 August 2026 | European Championships | Paris, France | |
| 4×200 m freestyle relay | 7:34.41 | not ratified | Miguel Pérez-Godoy (1:47.54); César Castro (1:48.05); Ainhoa Campabadal (1:59.09); Alba Herrero (1:59.73) | Spain | 15 August 2026 | European Championships | Paris, France | |
| 4×100 m medley relay | 3:45.10 | | Iván Martínez Sota (53.32); Nil Cadevall (59.87); Laura Cabanes (58.56); Irene Ciercoles (53.35) | Spain | 11 August 2026 | European Championships | Paris, France | |

Legend: # – Record awaiting ratification by RFEN; WR – World record; ER – European record; e – equalled existing record;
Records not set in finals: h – heat; so – swim-off

== Short course (25 m) ==
=== Men ===
| Event | Time | | Name | Club | Date | Meet | Location | Ref |
|---|---|---|---|---|---|---|---|---|
| 50m freestyle | 21.08 | sf, = | Luca Hoek | Spain | 6 December 2025 | European Championships | Lublin, Poland | |
| 50m freestyle | 21.08 | = | Luca Hoek | Spain | 7 December 2025 | European Championships | Lublin, Poland | |
| 100m freestyle | 45.93 | | Luca Hoek | C.N. Terrassa | 13 November 2026 | Spanish Championships | Madrid, Spain | |
| 200m freestyle | 1:42.07 | | Miguel Perez-Godoy | C.N. Terrassa | 15 November 2026 | Spanish Championships | Madrid, Spain | |
| 400m freestyle | 3:40.52 | h | Marcos Rivera | Spain | 10 December 2009 | European Championships | Istanbul, Turkey | |
| 800m freestyle | 7:35.35 | | Carlos Garach | C.N. Churriana | 15 November 2026 | Spanish Championships | Madrid, Spain | |
| 1500m freestyle | 14:30.79 | | Marc Sánchez | CN Sabadell | 20 December 2014 | - | Palma de Mallorca, Spain | |
| 50m backstroke | 23.04 | | Iván Martínez | C.N. Barcelona | 15 November 2026 | Spanish Championships | Madrid, Spain | |
| 100m backstroke | 49.05 | | Aschwin Wildeboer | Spain | 13 December 2009 | European Championships | Istanbul, Turkey | |
| 200m backstroke | 1:47.84 | | Hugo González | C.N. Terrassa | 14 November 2026 | Spanish Championships | Madrid, Spain | |
| 50m breaststroke | 26.03 | sf | Carles Coll | Spain | 6 December 2025 | European Championships | Lublin, Poland | |
| 100m breaststroke | 56.28 | h | Carles Coll | Spain | 2 December 2025 | European Championships | Lublin, Poland | |
| 200m breaststroke | 2:00.86 | | Carles Coll | Spain | 5 December 2025 | European Championships | Lublin, Poland | |
| 50m butterfly | 22.33 | sf | Rafael Muñoz | Spain | 14 December 2008 | European Championships | Rijeka, Croatia | |
| 100m butterfly | 49.74 | | Rafael Muñoz | Spain | 12 December 2008 | European Championships | Rijeka, Croatia | |
| 200m butterfly | 1:51.92 | h | Arbidel González | Spain | 12 December 2024 | World Championships | Budapest, Hungary | |
| 100m individual medley | 51.50 | sf | Carles Coll | Spain | 12 December 2024 | World Championships | Budapest, Hungary | |
| 100m individual medley | 51.46 | # | Hugo González | Minas TC | 4 September 2026 | José Finkel Trophy | São Paulo, Brazil | |
| 200m individual medley | 1:51.39 | | Hugo González | Spain | 6 December 2025 | European Championships | Lublin, Poland | |
| 400m individual medley | 4:01.58 | | Hugo González | CN Terrassa | 20 December 2025 | Spanish Club Cup Division of Honor | Sabadell, Spain | |
| 4×50m freestyle relay | 1:23.94 | | Luca Hoek (21.09); Sergio de Celis (20.78); Carles Coll (20.77); Miguel Perez-Godoy (21.30) | Spain | 2 December 2025 | European Championships | Lublin, Poland | |
| 4×100m freestyle relay | 3:05.57 | | Sergio de Celis (46.48); Luis Dominguez (46.40); Miguel Perez-Godoy (46.13); Nacho Campos (46.56) | Spain | 10 December 2024 | World Championships | Budapest, Hungary | |
| 4×200m freestyle relay | 6:52.74 | | Luis Dominguez (1:43.17); Miguel Perez-Godoy (1:42.66); Nacho Campos (1:43.84); Sergio de Celis (1:43.07) | Spain | 13 December 2024 | World Championships | Budapest, Hungary | |
| 4×50m medley relay | 1:31.84 | | Iván Martínez (23.31); Carles Coll (25.65); Hugo González (22.60); Sergio de Celis (20.28) | Spain | 7 December 2025 | European Championships | Lublin, Poland | |
| 4×100m medley relay | 3:24.39 | h | Iván Martínez (51.27); Carles Coll (56.89); Mario Molla (49.63); Luis Dominguez (46.60) | Spain | 15 December 2024 | World Championships | Budapest, Hungary | |

Legend: # – Record awaiting ratification by RFEN; WR – World record; ER – European record; e – equalled existing record;
Records not set in finals: h – heat; sf – semifinal; r – relay 1st leg; rh – relay heat 1st leg; b – B final; † – en route to final mark; so – swim-off; tt – time trial

=== Women ===
| Event | Time | | Name | Club | Date | Meet | Location | Ref |
|---|---|---|---|---|---|---|---|---|
| 50m freestyle | 24.16 | r | Lidón Muñoz | C.N. Sant Andreu | 15 November 2019 | Spanish Championships | Gijón, Spain | |
| 100m freestyle | 52.17 | | María Daza | Real Canoe N.C. | 20 December 2025 | Spanish Club Cup Division of Honor | Sabadell, Spain | |
| 200m freestyle | 1:52.52 | | Melani Costa | Spain | 10 August 2013 | World Cup | Berlin, Germany | |
| 400m freestyle | 3:54.52 | | Mireia Belmonte | Spain | 11 August 2013 | World Cup | Berlin, Germany | |
| 800m freestyle | 7:59.34 | ER | Mireia Belmonte | Spain | 10 August 2013 | World Cup | Berlin, Germany | |
| 1500m freestyle | 15:19.71 | | Mireia Belmonte | UCAM C.N. Fuensanta | 12 December 2014 | Spanish Championships | Sabadell, Spain | |
| 50m backstroke | 26.42 | h | Irene Ciercoles | C.N. Sant Andreu | 15 November 2026 | Spanish Championships | Madrid, Spain | |
| 100m backstroke | 56.09 | sf | Carmen Weiler | Spain | 10 December 2024 | World Championships | Budapest, Hungary | |
| 200m backstroke | 2:01.66 | | Carmen Weiler | Spain | 3 December 2025 | European Championships | Lublin, Poland | |
| 50m breaststroke | 29.73 | tt | María Ramos | C.D. Gredos San Diego | 16 December 2022 | Spanish Championships | Sabadell, Spain | |
| 100m breaststroke | 1:04.80 | | Jessica Vall | Spain | 16 December 2017 | European Championships | Copenhagen, Denmark | |
| 200m breaststroke | 2:18.41 | | Jessica Vall | Spain | 17 December 2017 | European Championships | Copenhagen, Denmark | |
| 50m butterfly | 25.96 | h | Lidón Muñoz | Spain | 6 November 2021 | European Championships | Kazan, Russia | |
| 100m butterfly | 57.77 | h | Irene Ciercoles | C.N. Sant Andreu | 30 July 2026 | CN Sabadell Trophy | Sabadell, Spain | |
| 200m butterfly | 1:59.61 | ER | Mireia Belmonte | Spain | 3 December 2014 | World Championships | Doha, Qatar | |
| 100m individual medley | 59.26 | tt | Emma Carrasco | C.N. Sant Andreu | 21 December 2023 | Spanish Club Cup Division of Honor | Barcelona, Spain | |
| 200m individual medley | 2:05.73 | | Mireia Belmonte | Spain | 18 December 2010 | World Championships | Dubai, United Arab Emirates | |
| 400m individual medley | 4:18.94 | ER | Mireia Belmonte | Spain | 12 August 2017 | World Cup | Eindhoven, Netherlands | |
| 4×50m freestyle relay | 1:38.50 | | María Daza (24.48); Carmen Weiler (24.32); Petra Bisa (24.90); Carlota Rodríguez (24.80) | Real Canoe N.C. | 20 December 2025 | Spanish Club Cup Division of Honor | Sabadell, Spain | |
| 4×100m freestyle relay | 3:35.27 | | María Daza (52.72); Carmen Weiler (52.88); Petra Bisa (55.38); Carlota Rodríguez (54.29) | Real Canoe N.C. | 20 December 2025 | Spanish Club Cup Division of Honor | Sabadell, Spain | |
| 4×200m freestyle relay | 7:48.16 | | Ainhoa Campabadal (1:55.84); Julia Muñoz (1:58.03); Júlia Pujadas (1:56.74); Carla Carrón (1:57.55) | C.N. Sant Andreu | 19 December 2025 | Spanish Club Cup Division of Honor | Sabadell, Spain | |
| 4×50m medley relay | 1:48.06 | | Lidón Muñoz (27.13); Jessica Vall (30.53); Alba Guillamón (25.91); Marta Gonzalez (24.49) | C.N. Sant Andreu | 21 December 2023 | Spanish Club Cup Division of Honor | Barcelona, Spain | |
| 4×100m medley relay | 3:56.33 | | África Zamorano (58.37); Jessica Vall (1:06.00); Emma Carrasco (58.26); Ainhoa Campabadal (53.70) | C.N. Sant Andreu | 21 December 2023 | Spanish Club Cup Division of Honor | Barcelona, Spain | |

Legend: # – Record awaiting ratification by RFEN; WR – World record; ER – European record; e – equalled existing record;
Records not set in finals: h – heat; sf – semifinal; r – relay 1st leg; rh – relay heat 1st leg; b – B final; † – en route to final mark; so – swim-off; tt – time trial

=== Mixed relay ===
| Event | Time | | Name | Club | Date | Meet | Location | Ref |
|---|---|---|---|---|---|---|---|---|
| 4×50 m freestyle relay | 1:30.52 | | Sergio de Celis (21.25); Luca Hoek (20.81); María Daza (24.29); Carmen Weiler (24.17) | Spain | 4 December 2025 | European Championships | Lublin, Poland | |
| 4×50 m medley relay | 1:39.11 | h | Carmen Weiler (26.80); Carles Coll (25.70); Mario Mollà (22.37); María Daza (24.24) | Spain | 11 December 2024 | World Championships | Budapest, Hungary | |
| 4×100 m medley relay | 3:35.52 | | Carmen Weiler (56.97); Carles Coll (56.63); Mario Mollá (49.19); María Daza (52.73) | Spain | 14 December 2024 | World Championships | Budapest, Hungary | |

Legend: # – Record awaiting ratification by RFEN; e – equalled existing record;
Records not set in finals: h – heat; so – swim-off
