= Sauveur Cristofini =

French swimmer (born 2009)

Personal information
- Nationality: French
- Born: 29 November 2009 (age 16) Marseille, France
- Height: 1.90 m (6 ft 3 in)

Sport
- Sport: Swimming
- Strokes: Freestyle, Individual Medley
- Club: GFC Ajaccio
- Coach: Philippe Lucas
Medal record
Men's swimming
Representing France
European Championships (LC)
Silver medal – second place	2026 Paris	4×200 m freestyle

Raphaël-Sauveur Cristofini (born 29 November 2009) is a French swimmer.

He competed in the 4×200 m freestyle relay event at the 2026 European Aquatics Championships, winning the silver medal.
