= List of Lithuanian records in swimming =

This is a listing of the national Swimming records for Lithuania. They are the fastest time ever-swum by a Lithuanian swimming in either a long course (50m) or short course (25m) pool. These records are maintained by Lithuania's national swimming federation: LTU Aquatics.

Records are keep for the following events, for both long course and short course pool and for males and females:

- freestyle: 50, 100, 200, 400, 800 and 1500;
- backstroke: 50, 100 and 200;
- breaststroke: 50, 100 and 200;
- butterfly: 50, 100 and 200;
- individual medley (or I.M.): 100 (25m only), 200, and 400; and
- relays: 4x50 free (25m only), 4x100 free, 4x200 free, 4x50 medley (25m only), and 4 × 100 medley.

== Long course (50m) ==
=== Men ===
Event	Time		Name	Club	Date	Meet	Location	Ref
50 m freestyle	21.70	so	Simonas Bilis	Lithuania	8 August 2018	European Championships	Glasgow, Great Britain	
100 m freestyle	47.75		Tomas Navikonis	Lithuania	12 August 2026	European Championships	Paris, France	
200 m freestyle	1:44.38		Danas Rapšys	Lithuania	17 August 2019	World Cup	Singapore, Singapore	
400 m freestyle	3:43.36		Danas Rapšys	Lithuania	12 May 2019	Champions Swim Series	Budapest, Hungary	
800 m freestyle	7:59.34		Danas Rapšys	Lithuania	15 April 2019	Swim Open Stockholm	Stockholm, Sweden	
1500 m freestyle	15:11.86		Džiugas Miškinis	Kentucky Aquatics	6 May 2026	Indy Spring Cup	Indianapolis, United States	
50m backstroke	24.54		Mantas Kaušpėdas	Klaipėdos Gintaro SC	24 April 2026	Lithuanian Championships	Vilnius, Lithuania	
100m backstroke	53.79		Danas Rapšys	Panevėžys Žemyna	28 May 2017	Romanian International Championships	Bucharest, Romania	
200m backstroke	1:56.11	sf	Danas Rapšys	Lithuania	27 July 2017	World Championships	Budapest, Hungary	
50m breaststroke	27.09	sf	Aleksas Savickas	Lithuania	14 August 2026	European Championships	Paris, France	
100m breaststroke	58.96	sf	Giedrius Titenis	Lithuania	2 August 2015	World Championships	Kazan, Russia	
200m breaststroke	2:07.80		Giedrius Titenis	Lithuania	31 Jul 2009	World Championships	Rome, Italy	
50m butterfly	23.58	h	Tadas Duškinas	Kauno PM	25 April 2019	Lithuanian Championships	Kaunas, Lithuania	
100m butterfly	51.83		Tajus Juška	Lithuania	21 August 2025	World Junior Championships	Otopeni, Romania	
200m butterfly	2:00.63	h	Deividas Margevičius	Lithuania	25 July 2017	World Championships	Budapest, Hungary	
200m individual medley	1:59.14		Danas Rapšys	Lithuania	16 August 2019	World Cup	Singapore, Singapore	
400m individual medley	4:19.65		Vytautas Janušaitis	Lithuania	10 Jun 2009	Mare Nostrum	Canet-en-Roussillon, France	
4×100m freestyle relay	3:12.74	h	Tajus Juška (48.60); Tomas Navikonis (47.47); Tomas Lukminas (47.83); Danas Rapšys (48.84)	Lithuania	27 July 2025	World Championships	Singapore, Singapore	
4×200m freestyle relay	7:03.53		Danas Rapšys (1:45.62); Tomas Navikonis (1:45.45); Kristupas Trepočka (1:47.16); Tajus Juška (1:45.30)	Lithuania	10 August 2026	European Championships	Paris, France	
4×100m medley relay	3:33.70		Danas Rapšys (54.80); Andrius Šidlauskas (58.80); Deividas Margevičius (52.29); Simonas Bilis (47.81)	Lithuania	9 August 2018	European Championships	Glasgow, Great Britain	

Legend: # – Record awaiting ratification by LPF; WR – World record; ER – European record; e – equalled existing record;
Records not set in finals: h – heat; sf – semifinal; r – relay 1st leg; rh – relay heat 1st leg; b – B final; † – en route to final mark; tt – time trial

=== Women ===
Event	Time		Name	Club	Date	Meet	Location	Ref
50m freestyle	25.04	sf	Rūta Meilutytė	Lithuania	3 August 2018	European Championships	Glasgow, United Kingdom	
100m freestyle	54.74		Smiltė Plytnykaitė	Sostinės SC	15 April 2023	Lithuanian Championships	Kaunas, Lithuania	
200m freestyle	1:56.90	sf	Ieva Jurkūnaitė	Lithuania	12 August 2026	European Championships	Paris, France	
400m freestyle	4:14.30	b	Silvija Statkevičius	Etobicoke	7 July 2026	Canadian Trials	Montreal, Canada	
800m freestyle	8:55.23		Silvija Statkevičius	Etobicoke	3 March 2022	Trials Selection Prep Invite	Toronto, Canada	
1500m freestyle	17:27.11		Silvija Statkevičius	Etobicoke	24 April 2022	Eastern Canadian Championships	Pointe-Claire, Canada	
50m backstroke	28.08	sf	Emilija Pociūtė	Lithuania	12 August 2026	European Championships	Paris, France	
100m backstroke	1:01.41		Emilija Pociūtė	Šiaulių Delfinas	23 April 2026	Lithuanian Championships	Vilnius, Lithuania	
200m backstroke	2:11.56		Ugnė Mažutaitytė	Fresno State Swimming	8 December 2019	U.S. Open	Atlanta, United States	
50m breaststroke	29.16	WR	Rūta Meilutytė	Lithuania	30 July 2023	World Championships	Fukuoka, Japan	
100m breaststroke	1:04.35	sf, ER	Rūta Meilutytė	Lithuania	29 July 2013	World Championships	Barcelona, Spain	
200m breaststroke	2:22.86		Kotryna Teterevkova	Lithuania	5 August 2023	World University Games	Chengdu, China	
50m butterfly	26.32		Barbora Mileišytė	Sostinės SC	2 May 2026	Alytus Grand Prix	Alytus, Lithuania	
100m butterfly	1:00.28		Erika Pašakinskaitė	Newham & University of East London	26 April 2025	SE London Summer Championships	London, United Kingdom	
200m butterfly	2:15.17		Erika Pašakinskaitė	Newham & University of East London	3 May 2025	SE London Summer Championships	London, United Kingdom	
200m individual medley	2:12.32		Rūta Meilutytė	Lithuania	29 August 2013	World Junior Championships	Dubai, United Arab Emirates	
400m individual medley	4:55.78		Guoda Tručinskaitė	Šiaulių Delfinas	4 April 2025	Lithuanian Championships	Vilnius, Lithuania	
4×100m freestyle relay	3:42.78		Ieva Jurkunaite (55.77); Ieva Visockaite (55.93); Smiltė Plytnykaitė (55.71); Sylvia Statkevičius (55.37)	Lithuania	1 July 2025	European Junior Championships	Šamorín, Slovakia	
4×200m freestyle relay	8:02.15		Ieva Jurkunaite (2:00.56); Sylvia Statkevičius (1:59.32); Ieva Visockaite (2:01.10); Ieva Nainyte (2:01.17)	Lithuania	3 July 2025 (Note: by official result source; 2 July 2025 by LTU Aquatics, a typo)	European Junior Championships	Šamorín, Slovakia	
4×100m medley relay	4:05.22		Emilija Pociūtė (1:02.47); Smiltė Plytnykaitė (1:06.76); Guoda Trucinskaite (1:01.38); Sylvia Statkevičius (54.61)	Lithuania	6 July 2025	European Junior Championships	Šamorín, Slovakia	

Legend: # – Record awaiting ratification by LPF; WR – World record; ER – European record; e – equalled existing record;
Records not set in finals: h – heat; sf – semifinal; r – relay 1st leg; rh – relay heat 1st leg; b – B final; † – en route to final mark; so – swim-off; tt – time trial

=== Mixed relay ===
Event	Time		Name	Nationality	Date	Meet	Location	Ref
4×100 m freestyle relay	3:31.48		Rokas Jazdauskas (50.76); Kristupas Trepocka (50.13); Smiltė Plytnykaitė (55.16); Sylvia Statkevičius (55.43)	Lithuania	6 September 2023	World Junior Championships	Netanya, Israel	
4×200 m freestyle relay	7:28.35	#	Danas Rapšys (1:47.38); Tomas Navikonis (1:45.59); Sylvia Statkevičius (1:58.68); Ieva Jurkūnaitė (1:56.40)	Lithuania	15 August 2026	European Championships	Paris, France	
4×100 m medley relay	3:50.12	h	Mantas Kaušpėdas (55.91); Kotryna Teterevkova (1:06.02); Kristupas Trepočka (52.80); Sylvia Statkevičius (55.39)	Lithuania	11 August 2026	European Championships	Paris, France	

Legend: e – equalled existing record;
Records not set in finals: h – heat; so – swim-off

== Short Course (25m) ==
=== Men ===
Event	Time		Name	Club	Date	Meet	Location	Ref
50m freestyle	20.98		Simonas Bilis	Lithuania	6 December 2019	European Championships	Glasgow, Great Britain	
100m freestyle	45.87	h, =	Tomas Lukminas	Lithuania	5 December 2025	European Championships	Lublin, Poland	
100m freestyle	45.87	=	Tomas Lukminas	Lithuania	6 December 2025	European Championships	Lublin, Poland	
200m freestyle	1:40.85		Danas Rapšys	Lithuania	14 December 2017	European Championships	Copenhagen, Denmark	
400m freestyle	3:33.20		Danas Rapšys	Lithuania	4 December 2019	European Championships	Glasgow, Great Britain	
800m freestyle	7:47.88		Džiugas Miškinis	Kauno PM	14 December 2024	Lithuanian Championships	Vilnius, Lithuania	
1500m freestyle	14:42.94		Džiugas Miškinis	Kauno PM	13 December 2024	Lithuanian Championships	Vilnius, Lithuania	
50m backstroke	22.91	h, so	Mantas Kaušpėdas	Lithuania	12 December 2024	World Championships	Budapest, Hungary	
100m backstroke	50.81		Mantas Kaušpėdas	Klaipėdos Gintaro SC	19 December 2025	Lithuanian Championships	Vilnius, Lithuania	
200m backstroke	1:49.06		Danas Rapšys	Lithuania	13 December 2017	European Championships	Copenhagen, Denmark	
50m breaststroke	26.06		Andrius Šidlauskas	Šiaulių Delfinas	20 December 2025	Lithuanian Championships	Vilnius, Lithuania	
100m breaststroke	56.81		Andrius Šidlauskas	Šiaulių Delfinas	19 December 2025	Lithuanian Championships	Vilnius, Lithuania	
200m breaststroke	2:05.14		Andrius Šidlauskas	Lithuania	30 October 2021	World Cup	Kazan, Russia	
50m butterfly	22.70		Deividas Margevičius	Lithuania	6 August 2017	World Cup	Berlin, Germany	
100m butterfly	50.79		Danas Rapšys	Panevėžio Žemyna	22 December 2017	Lithuanian Championships	Anykščiai, Lithuania	
200m butterfly	1:53.83	h	Deividas Margevičius	Lithuania	11 December 2018	World Championships	Hangzhou, China	
100m individual medley	52.35		Vytautas Janušaitis	Lithuania	14 November 2009	World Cup	Berlin, Germany	
200m individual medley	1:52.22		Vytautas Janušaitis	Lithuania	10 December 2009	European Championships	Istanbul, Turkey	
400m individual medley	4:05.85		Vytautas Janušaitis	Lithuania	26 November 2010	European Championships	Eindhoven, Netherlands	
4×50m freestyle relay	1:25.89		Paulius Viktoravičius (22.14); Giedrius Titenis (21.33); Vytautas Janušaitis (21.45); Mindaugas Sadauskas (20.97)	Lithuania	13 December 2009	European Championships	Istanbul, Turkey	
4×100m freestyle relay	3:11.54		Tomas Lukminas (47.05); Anas Augustinavicius (48.59); Arminas Murenas (48.87); Kristupas Trepočka (47.03)	Panevėžio Žemyna	20 December 2025	Lithuanian Championships	Vilnius, Lithuania	
4×200m freestyle relay	7:03.39	h	Danas Rapšys (1:40.95); Deividas Margevicius (1:45.75); Andrius Šidlauskas (1:49.36); Tadas Duškinas (1:47.33)	Lithuania	14 December 2018	World Championships	Hangzhou, China	
4×50m medley relay	1:33.22	h	Mantas Kaušpėdas (23.38); Andrius Šidlauskas (25.68); Tajus Juška (23.31); Tomas Lukminas (20.85)	Lithuania	7 December 2025	European Championships	Lublin, Poland	
4×100m medley relay	3:24.51		Danas Rapšys (51.44); Andrius Šidlauskas (57.14); Deividas Margevicius (50.01); Simonas Bilis (45.92)	Lithuania	16 December 2018	World Championships	Hangzhou, China	

Legend: # – Record awaiting ratification by LPF; WR – World record; ER – European record; e – equalled existing record;
Records not set in finals: h – heat; sf – semifinal; r – relay 1st leg; rh – relay heat 1st leg; b – B final; † – en route to final mark; so – swim-off; tt – time trial

=== Women ===
Event	Time		Name	Club	Date	Meet	Location	Ref
50m freestyle	24.32		Rūta Meilutytė	KPM	18 December 2021	Lithuanian Championships	Klaipėda, Lithuania	
100m freestyle	53.54	h	Rūta Meilutytė	Lithuania	13 December 2012	World Championships	Istanbul, Turkey	
200m freestyle	1:56.58		Sylvia Statkevičius	Etobicoke	13 December 2024	Ontario Junior International Championships	Toronto, Canada	
400m freestyle	4:11.12		Ieva Visockaitė	Kauno PM	15 December 2024	Lithuanian Championships	Vilnius, Lithuania	
800m freestyle	8:43.50		Jūratė Ščerbinskaitė	Plymouth Leander	7 December 2013	ASA South West Regional Championships	Millfield, Great Britain	
1500m freestyle	17:27.20		Ugne Siautkulyte	Šiaulių "Delfinas"	26 January 2025	Lithuanian Long Distance Virtual Competitions	Lietuva, Lithuania	
50m backstroke	27.42		Emilija Pociūtė	Šiaulių "Delfinas"	14 December 2024	Lithuanian Championships	Vilnius, Lithuania	
100m backstroke	59.06		Emilija Pociūtė	Šiaulių Delfinas	14 November 2025	LTU Aquatics Team Cup	Druskininkai, Lithuania	
200m backstroke	2:07.29		Ugnė Mažutaitytė	Kauno PM	21 December 2019	Lithuanian Championships	Anykščiai, Lithuania	
50m breaststroke	28.37	sf, WR	Rūta Meilutytė	Lithuania	17 December 2022	World Championships	Melbourne, Australia	
100m breaststroke	1:02.36	=WR	Rūta Meilutytė	Lithuania	12 October 2013	World Cup	Moscow, Russia	
200m breaststroke	2:19.30		Kotryna Teterevkova	Lithuania	5 December 2025	European Championships	Lublin, Poland	
50m butterfly	26.28		Smiltė Plytnykaitė	Sostinės SC	19 December 2025	Lithuanian Championships	Vilnius, Lithuania	
100m butterfly	59.45		Kotryna Teterevkova	Lithuania	9 November 2024	LTU Aquatics Team Cup	Druskininkai, Lithuania	
200m butterfly	2:13.96		Guoda Tručinskaitė	Lithuania	28 November 2025	Nordic Championships	Reykjavík, Iceland	
100m individual medley	57.68		Rūta Meilutytė	Lithuania	14 December 2013	European Championships	Herning, Denmark	
200m individual medley	2:09.55		Rūta Meilutytė	Plymouth Leander	22 December 2012	Lithuanian Championships	Anykščiai, Lithuania	
400m individual medley	4:44.38		Guoda Tručinskaitė	Šiaulių Delfinas	20 December 2025	Lithuanian Championships	Vilnius, Lithuania	
4×50m freestyle relay	1:46.36		Vaiva Gimbutytė (26.85); Vaiva Štaraitė (26.80); Beatričė Kanapienytė (26.81); Diana Jarusevičiūtė (25.90)	Kauno PM	17 July 2014	Belarus Open	Brest, Belarus	
4×100m freestyle relay	3:40.92		Ieva Visockaite (55.05); Ieva Nainyte (54.68); Rusnė Vasiliauskaitė (56.95); Ieva Jurkunaite (54.24)	Kauno PM	20 December 2025 (Note: by official result source; 21 December 2025 by LTU Aquatics source, a typo)	Lithuanian Championships	Vilnius, Lithuania	
4×200m freestyle relay	8:17.80		Ieva Nainytė (2:02.78); Guoda Stančikaitė (2:04.48); Kotryna Paradnikaitė (2:06.83); Stela Švenčionytė (2:03.71)	Lithuania	28 November 2025	Nordic Championships	Reykjavík, Iceland	
4×50m medley relay	1:56.56		Meda Kulbačiauskaitė (30.26); Agnė Šeleikaitė (32.56); Beatričė Kanapienytė (27.62); Diana Jaruševičiūtė (26.12)	Kauno PM	11 November 2016	Lithuanian Swimming Cup	Anykščiai, Lithuania	
4×100m medley relay	4:06.51		Stela Švenčionytė (1:03.43); Smiltė Plytnykaitė (1:05.79); Patricija Kondraškaitė (1:00.71); Elzė Morta Daunoravičiūtė (56.58)	Sostines SC	21 December 2025	Lithuanian Championships	Vilnius, Lithuania	

Legend: # – Record awaiting ratification by LPF; WR – World record; ER – European record; e – equalled existing record;
Records not set in finals: h – heat; sf – semifinal; r – relay 1st leg; rh – relay heat 1st leg; b – B final; † – en route to final mark; so – swim-off; tt – time trial

=== Mixed relay ===
Event	Time		Name	Club	Date	Meet	Location	Ref
4×50 m freestyle relay	1:37.72	=	Ugnius Kamandulis (23.34); Kiril Stepanov (23.37); Smiltė Plytnykaitė (25.20); Patricija Kondraškaitė (25.81)	Sostinės	12 November 2022	Lithuanian Swimming Federation Cup	Druskininkai, Lithuania	
4×50 m freestyle relay	1:37.72	=	Rokas Jazdauskas (23.42); Tomas Lukminas (22.60); Beata Jakštaitė (26.32); Amelija Murenaitė (25.38)	Panevezio Zemyna	12 November 2022	Lithuanian Swimming Federation Cup	Druskininkai, Lithuania	
4×100 m freestyle relay	4:11.55		Džiugas Miškinis; Meda Bielskutė; Ūla Adomaitė; Ridas Arštikaitis	Kauno PM	20 April 2019	Snack King	Kaunas, Lithuania	
4×50 m medley relay	1:38.71		Mantas Kaušpėdas (23.14); Rūta Meilutytė (29.18); Smiltė Plytnykaitė (25.87); Jokubas Keblys (20.52)	Lithuania	3 December 2025	European Championships	Lublin, Poland	
4×100 m medley relay	3:45.77		Emilija Pociūtė (1:01.11); Andrius Šidlauskas (56.70); Guoda Tručinskaitė (1:00.80); Danas Rapšys (47.16)	Šiaulių Delfinas	19 December 2025	Lithuanian Championships	Vilnius, Lithuania	

Legend: e – equalled existing record;
Records not set in finals: h – heat; so – swim-off

== See also ==
- List of Baltic records in swimming
- List of Lithuanian records
