= Odysseus Meladinis =

Greek swimmer (born 1990)

Personal information
- Native name: Οδυσσέας Μελαδίνης
- Born: 5 April 1990 (age 36) Cholargos, Greece
- Height: 1.94 m (6 ft 4 in)
- Weight: 90 kg (198 lb)

Sport
- Sport: Swimming
Medal record
Representing Greece
European Championships (LC)
| Bronze medal – third place | 2024 Belgrade | 4x100 m freestyle |
Mediterranean Games
| Bronze medal – third place | 2013 Mersin | 4x100m freestyle relay |

Odysseus Meladinis (Greek: Οδυσσέας Μελαδίνης, also transliterated as Odyssefs or Odysseas, born 5 April 1990) is a Greek swimmer. He competed in the men's 50 metre freestyle event and the men's 4 × 100 metre freestyle relay event at the 2016 Summer Olympics. He finished 33rd in the heats for the men's 50 m freestyle competition, where only swimmers with the top 16 times advanced to the semifinals. The Greek men's 4 × 100 metre freestyle relay team finished 10th in the heats and did not qualify for the final.

Meladinis also competed for Greece at the 2020 Summer Olympics and 2024 Summer Olympics.
