= George-Adrian Ratiu =

Romanian swimmer (born 2000)

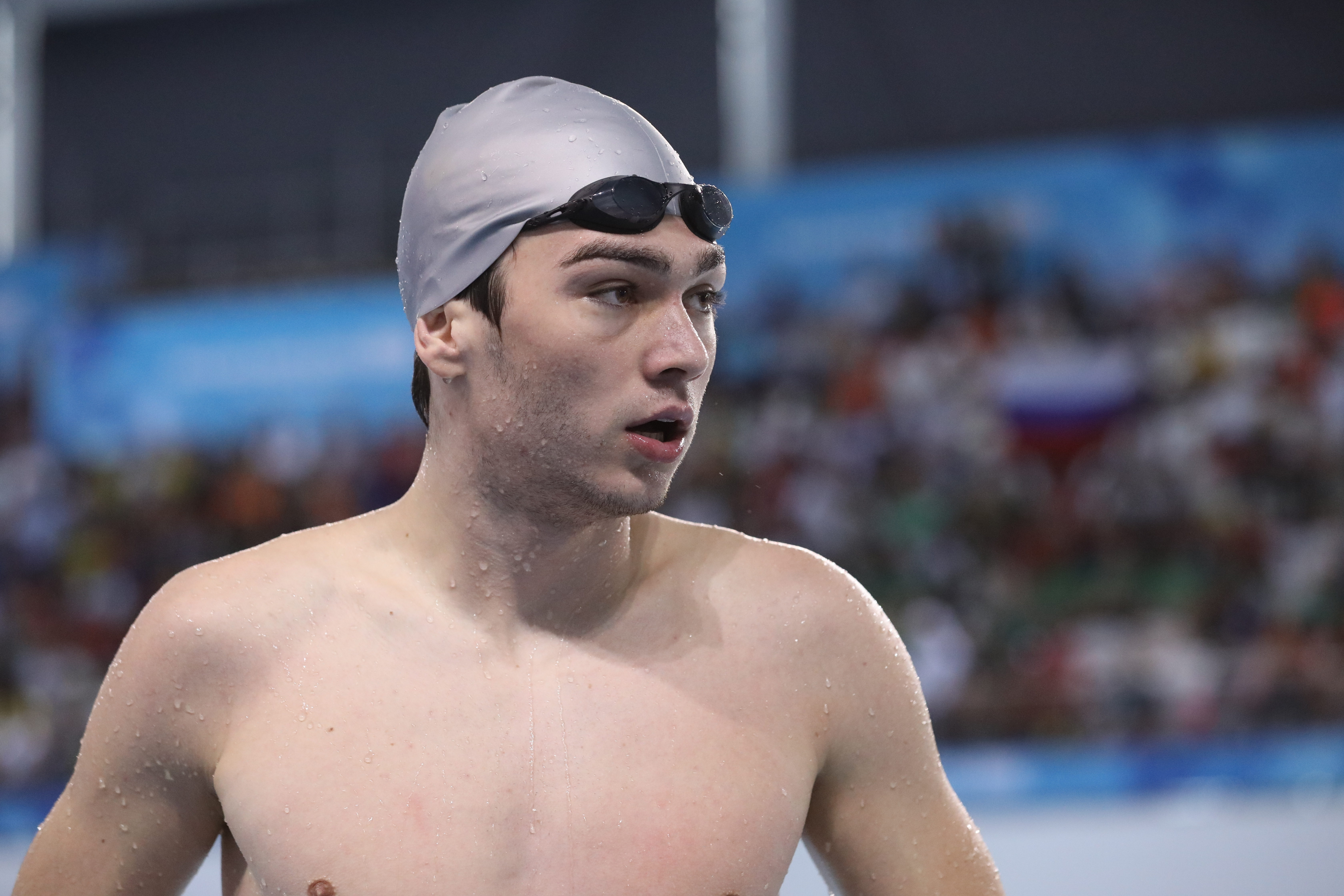

Personal information
- Nationality: Romanian
- Born: 23 April 2000 (age 24)

Sport
- Sport: Swimming

George-Adrian Ratiu (born 23 April 2000) is a Romanian swimmer. He competed in the men's 50 metre freestyle event at the 2018 FINA World Swimming Championships (25 m), in Hangzhou, China. In 2019, he represented Romania at the 2019 World Aquatics Championships in Gwangju, South Korea. He competed in the men's 50 metre butterfly and men's 50 metre freestyle events where he did not advance to compete in the semi-finals.
