= Nikola Aćin =

Serbian swimmer (born 1999)

Personal information
- Nationality: Serbia
- Born: 19 December 1999 (age 26) Zrenjanin, Serbia, FR Yugoslavia

Sport
- Sport: Swimming
- Strokes: Freestyle, backstroke
- Club: PK Proleter Zrenjanin
- College team: Purdue Boilermakers, Michigan Wolverines
Medal record
Men's swimming
Representing Serbia
European Championships (LC)
Gold medal – first place	2024 Belgrade	4×100 m freestyle relay

Nikola Aćin (Serbian Cyrillic: Никола Аћин; born 19 December 1999) is a Serbian swimmer. He competed in the men's 4 × 100 metre freestyle relay event at the 2020 Summer Olympics together with Andrej Barna, Uroš Nikolić and Velimir Stjepanović. They finished 10th with time 3:13.71, setting the new Serbian national record.
