= 2024 European Aquatics Championships =

Water sport competitions

37th European Aquatics Championships
- Host city: Belgrade, Serbia
- Date: 10–23 June 2024
- Venue(s): Sports Centre Milan Gale Muškatirović; Serbian Institute for Sports and Sports Medicine (diving); Ada Ciganlija (open water swimming)

The 2024 European Aquatics Championships took place in Belgrade, Serbia, from 10 to 23 June 2024. The Italian swimming team did not participate in the event due to its concurrence with the Settecolli Trophy, chosen as a key event in preparation and qualification for the Paris Olympics.

== Schedule ==
A total of 74 medal events are held across 4 disciplines. Competition dates by discipline are:

- Swimming: 17–23 June
- Open water swimming: 12–15 June
- Artistic swimming: 10–14 June
- Diving: 17–23 June

●	Finals

June	10	11	12	13	14	15	16	17	18	19	20	21	22	23	Total
Swimming								3	6	7	5	6	6	10	43
Open water swimming			2	2	2	1									7
Artistic swimming	1	2	2	3	3										11
Diving								1	2	2	2	2	2	2	13
Total	1	2	4	5	5	1		4	8	9	7	8	8	12	74
Cumulative Total	1	3	7	12	17	18		22	30	39	46	54	62	74	74

== Overall medal table ==
* Host nation (Serbia)

Rank	Nation	Gold	Silver	Bronze	Total
1	Hungary	12	9	10	31
2	Spain	7	3	1	11
3	Greece	6	10	4	20
4	Great Britain	5	4	7	16
5	Austria	5	1	0	6
6	Poland	4	7	7	18
7	Germany	4	7	5	16
8	Israel	4	2	3	9
9	Italy	3	11	6	20
10	Ukraine	3	3	3	9
11	Sweden	3	2	4	9
12	Czech Republic	3	2	2	7
13	France	2	3	5	10
14	Turkey	2	1	3	6
15	Netherlands	2	0	2	4
16	Romania	2	0	0	2
17	Denmark	1	2	2	5
18	Belgium	1	1	1	3
18	Ireland	1	1	1	3
18	Lithuania	1	1	1	3
21	Portugal	1	0	1	2
21	Serbia*	1	0	1	2
23	Bulgaria	1	0	0	1
23	Estonia	1	0	0	1
25	Switzerland	0	1	4	5
26	Bosnia and Herzegovina	0	1	0	1
26	Finland	0	1	0	1
26	Norway	0	1	0	1
Totals (28 entries)		75	74	73	222

== Team trophy ==
=== Swimming (50 m) ===
Rank	Team	Points
1		
2		
3		
4		
5		
6		
7		
8		
9		
10		

=== Open water swimming ===
Rank	Team	Points
1	Italy	214
2	Germany	161
3	Hungary	159
4	France	107
5	Spain	91
6	Israel	33
7	Greece	26
7	Monaco	26
9	Great Britain	21
10	Czech Republic	18

=== Artistic swimming ===
Rank	Team	Points
1		
2		
3		
4		
5		
6		
7		
8		
9		
10		

=== Diving ===
Rank	Team	Points
1	Ukraine	179
2	Great Britain	156
3	Spain	154
4	Germany	146
5	France	137
6	Italy	104
7	Sweden	94
8	Poland	72
9	Romania	57
10	Austria	50

== Results ==
=== Swimming ===
==== Medal table ====
After all 43 events.

* Host nation (Serbia)

Rank	Nation	Gold	Silver	Bronze	Total
1	Hungary	10	9	8	27
2	Greece	5	8	4	17
3	Israel	4	2	1	7
4	Poland	3	6	6	15
5	Czech Republic	3	2	2	7
6	Turkey	2	1	3	6
7	Ukraine	2	1	2	5
8	Austria	2	1	0	3
9	Sweden	2	0	3	5
10	Romania	2	0	0	2
11	Germany	1	3	3	7
12	Denmark	1	2	2	5
13	Belgium	1	1	1	3
13	Lithuania	1	1	1	3
15	Ireland	1	1	0	2
16	Portugal	1	0	1	2
16	Serbia*	1	0	1	2
18	Bulgaria	1	0	0	1
18	Estonia	1	0	0	1
20	Switzerland	0	1	4	5
21	Great Britain	0	1	1	2
22	Bosnia and Herzegovina	0	1	0	1
22	Finland	0	1	0	1
Totals (23 entries)		44	42	43	129

==== Men ====
Event	Gold		Silver		Bronze	
50 m freestyle	Kristian Gkolomeev; Greece	21.72	Stergios Marios Bilas; Greece	21.73	Vladyslav Bukhov; Ukraine	21.85
100 m freestyle	David Popovici; Romania	46.88	Nándor Németh; Hungary	47.49	Andrej Barna; Serbia	47.66 NR
200 m freestyle	David Popovici; Romania	1:43.13	Danas Rapšys; Lithuania	1:45.65	Antonio Djakovic; Switzerland	1:46.32
400 m freestyle	Felix Auböck; Austria	3:43.24 NR	Dimitrios Markos; Greece	3:47.44 NR	Antonio Djakovic; Switzerland	3:47.62
800 m freestyle	Mykhailo Romanchuk; Ukraine	7:46.20	Dimitrios Markos; Greece	7:48.59 NR	Zalán Sárkány; Hungary	7:49.29
1500 m freestyle	Kuzey Tunçelli; Turkey	14:55.64	Mykhailo Romanchuk; Ukraine	15:00.99	Zalán Sárkány; Hungary	15:06.67
50 m backstroke	Apostolos Christou; Greece	24.39	Ksawery Masiuk; Poland	24.63	Evangelos Makrygiannis; Greece	24.74
100 m backstroke	Apostolos Christou; Greece	52.23	Evangelos Makrygiannis; Greece	52.83	Ksawery Masiuk; Poland	53.56
200 m backstroke	Oleksandr Zheltyakov; Ukraine	1:55.39 NR	Apostolos Siskos; Greece	1:55.42 NR	Roman Mityukov; Switzerland	1:55.75
50 m breaststroke	Hüseyin Emre Sakçı; Turkey	26.92	Noel de Geus; Germany	26.93	Kristian Pitshugin; Israel	27.02 NR
100 m breaststroke	Melvin Imoudu; Germany	58.84	Berkay Öğretir; Turkey	59.23	Andrius Šidlauskas; Lithuania	59.27
200 m breaststroke	Lyubomir Epitropov; Bulgaria Erik Persson; Sweden	2:09.45 NR 2:09.45	not awarded		Jan Kałusowski; Poland	2:10.20
50 m butterfly	Stergios Marios Bilas; Greece	23.15	Simon Bucher; Austria	23.19	Daniel Gracík; Czech Republic	23.26
100 m butterfly	Kristóf Milák; Hungary	50.82	Hubert Kós; Hungary	50.96	Jakub Majerski; Poland	50.98
200 m butterfly	Kristóf Milák; Hungary	1:54.43	Krzysztof Chmielewski; Poland	1:54.78	Michal Chmielewski; Poland	1:55.51
200 m individual medley	Hubert Kós; Hungary	1:57.21	Ron Polonsky; Israel	1:57.36	Berke Saka; Turkey	1:58.62
400 m individual medley	Apostolos Papastamos; Greece	4:10.83 NR	Balázs Holló; Hungary	4:11.51	Gábor Zombori; Hungary	4:11.70
4 × 100 m freestyle relay	Serbia; Velimir Stjepanović (47.99); Nikola Aćin (48.64); Justin Cvetkov (49.41); Andrej Barna (46.86)	3:12.90 NR	Poland; Mateusz Chowaniec (48.45); Dominik Dudys (48.60); Ksawery Masiuk (48.04); Kamil Sieradzki (48.16); Bartosz Piszczorowicz; Paweł Korzeniowski	3:13.25 NR	Greece; Apostolos Christou (48.82); Stergios Marios Bilas (48.50); Kristian Gkolomeev (48.04); Andreas Vazaios (48.37); Odysseus Meladinis; Evangelos Makrygiannis	3:13.73
4 × 200 m freestyle relay	Lithuania; Tomas Navikonis (1:47.42); Tomas Lukminas (1:47.66); Kristupas Trepočka (1:48.06); Danas Rapšys (1:44.90); Rokas Jazdauskas	7:08.04 NR	Hungary; Nándor Németh (1:46.11); Balázs Holló (1:48.09); Richárd Márton (1:47.63); Hubert Kós (1:47.76); Attila Kovács; Boldizsár Magda	7:09.59	Greece; Dimitrios Markos (1:47.12); Konstantinos Englezakis (1:46.60); Konstantinos Emmanouil Stamou (1:48.61); Andreas Vazaios (1:47.40)	7:09.73
4 × 100 m medley relay	Austria; Bernhard Reitshammer (54.54); Valentin Bayer (59.87); Simon Bucher (51.42); Heiko Gigler (47.58)	3:33.41	Poland; Ksawery Masiuk (54.50); Jan Kalusowski (59.74); Jakub Majerski (51.17); Kamil Sieradzki (48.03); Kacper Stokowski; Adrian Jaśkiewicz; Dominik Dudys	3:33.44	Ukraine; Oleksandr Zheltiakov (53.91); Volodymyr Lisovets (58.96); Arsenii Kovalov (51.90); Illia Linnyk (48.73)	3:33.50 NR

==== Women ====
Event	Gold		Silver		Bronze	
50 m freestyle	Petra Senánszky; Hungary	24.56 NR	Theodora Drakou; Greece	24.59 NR	Julie Kepp Jensen; Denmark	24.79
100 m freestyle	Barbora Seemanová; Czech Republic	53.50 NR	Barbora Janíčková; Czech Republic	54.17	Nikolett Pádár; Hungary	54.22
200 m freestyle	Barbora Seemanová; Czech Republic	1:55.37	Lilla Minna Ábrahám; Hungary	1:57.22	Nicole Maier; Germany	1:57.36
400 m freestyle	Ajna Késely; Hungary	4:06.56	Barbora Seemanová; Czech Republic	4:06.72	Francisca Martins; Portugal	4:10.94
800 m freestyle	Ajna Késely; Hungary	8:29.96	Fleur Lewis; Great Britain	8:33.54	Deniz Ertan; Turkey	8:34.31
1500 m freestyle	Vivien Jackl; Hungary	16:06.37	Celine Rieder; Germany	16:15.98	Fleur Lewis; Great Britain	16:17.53
50 m backstroke	Danielle Hill; Ireland	27.73	Theodora Drakou; Greece	27.87	Adela Piskorska; Poland	28.00
100 m backstroke	Adela Piskorska; Poland	59.79	Danielle Hill; Ireland	1:00.19	Roos Vanotterdijk; Belgium	1:00.58
200 m backstroke	Camila Rebelo; Portugal	2:08.95 NR	Dóra Molnár; Hungary	2:09.02	Eszter Szabó-Feltóthy; Hungary	2:09.21
50 m breaststroke	Dominika Sztandera; Poland	30.55 NR	Veera Kivirinta; Finland	30.65	Olivia Klint Ipsa; Sweden	30.90
100 m breaststroke	Eneli Jefimova; Estonia	1:06.41	Lisa Mamié; Switzerland	1:07.15	Olivia Klint Ipsa; Sweden	1:07.73
200 m breaststroke	Kristýna Horská; Czech Republic	2:23.60	Clara Rybak-Andersen; Denmark	2:25.20	Lisa Mamié; Switzerland	2:26.10
50 m butterfly	Sara Junevik; Sweden	25.68	Roos Vanotterdijk; Belgium	26.08	Anna Ntountounaki; Greece	26.18
100 m butterfly	Roos Vanotterdijk; Belgium	57.47	Georgia Damasioti; Greece	57.74	Sara Junevik; Sweden	58.06
200 m butterfly	Helena Rosendahl Bach; Denmark	2:07.88	Lana Pudar; Bosnia and Herzegovina	2:08.15	Boglárka Telegdy Kapás; Hungary	2:08.22
200 m individual medley	Anastasia Gorbenko; Israel	2:09.75	Lea Polonsky; Israel	2:11.18	Barbora Seemanová; Czech Republic	2:11.48
400 m individual medley	Anastasia Gorbenko; Israel	4:36.05	Vivien Jackl; Hungary	4:38.96	Zsuzsanna Jakabos; Hungary	4:40.24
4 × 100 m freestyle relay	Hungary; Petra Senánszky (54.79); Lilla Minna Ábrahám (54.43); Panna Ugrai (53.88); Nikolett Pádár (53.67); Dóra Molnár; Zsuzsanna Jakabos	3:36.77 NR	Denmark; Elisabeth Sabroe Ebbesen (54.75); Signe Bro (54.72); Julie Kepp Jensen (54.12); Schastine Tabor (54.89); Karoline Sørensen	3:38.48	Poland; Kornelia Fiedkiewicz (55.06); Zuzanna Famulok (55.70); Wiktoria Gusc (55.31); Aleksandra Polanska (54.94); Julia Maik	3:41.01
4 × 200 m freestyle relay	Israel; Anastasia Gorbenko (1:56.74) NR; Daria Golovaty (1:57.94); Ayla Spitz (1:59.07); Lea Polonsky (1:58.08); Andrea Murez	7:51.83 NR	Hungary; Lilla Minna Ábrahám (1:58.39); Ajna Késely (1:59.26); Dóra Molnár (1:59.40); Nikolett Pádár (1:55.87); Zsuzsanna Jakabos; Panna Ugrai	7:52.92	Turkey; Gizem Güvenç (1:59.26); Ela Naz Özdemir (2:00.48); Ecem Dönmez (2:00.99); Zehra Duru Bilgin (2:00.85)	8:01.58 NR
4 × 100 m medley relay	Poland; Adela Piskorska (1:00.40); Dominika Sztandera (1:06.07); Paulina Peda (58.15); Kornelia Fiedkiewicz (54.09); Laura Bernat; Wiktoria Piotrowska; Zuzanna Famulok	3:58.71 NR	Hungary; Lora Komoróczy (1:01.08); Eszter Békési (1:08.49); Panna Ugrai (57.91); Nikolett Pádár (54.02); Lilla Minna Ábrahám	4:01.50 NR	Denmark; Schastine Tabor (1:01.97); Clara Rybak-Andersen (1:08.04); Helena Rosendahl Bach (57.82); Julie Kepp Jensen (54.20); Elisabeth Ebbesen	4:02.03

==== Mixed events ====
Event	Gold		Silver		Bronze	
4 × 100 m mixed freestyle relay	Hungary; Hubert Kós (49.39); Szebasztián Szabó (48.21); Panna Ugrai (54.38); Nikolett Pádár (53.71); Bence Szabados; Boldizsár Magda; Lilla Minna Ábrahám	3:25.69	Poland; Mateusz Chowaniec (48.67); Kamil Sieradzki (48.61); Zuzanna Famulok (55.09); Kornelia Fiedkiewicz (54.16); Bartosz Piszczorowicz; Dominik Dudys; Wiktoria Gusc; Aleksandra Polańska	3:26.53	Germany; Martin Wrede (49.29); Peter Varjasi (48.26); Nicole Maier (54.68); Nina Jazy (54.78); Ole Mats Eidam; Maya Werner; Leonie Kullmann	3:27.01
4 × 200 m mixed freestyle relay	Hungary; Richárd Márton (1:49.43); Balázs Holló (1:46.70); Lilla Minna Ábrahám (1:58.61); Nikolett Pádár (1:55.37); Attila Kovács; Boldizsár Magda; Dóra Molnár	7:30.11; NR	Poland; Bartosz Piszczorowicz (1:48.93); Kamil Sieradzki (1:46.97); Wiktoria Gusc (1:59.05); Zuzanna Famulok (2:00.13); Dominik Dudys; Aleksandra Knop	7:35.08; NR	Germany; Danny Schmidt (1:49.45); Philipp Peschke (1:48.08); Nicole Maier (1:58.28); Leonie Kullmann (1:59.75); Jarno Bäschnitt	7:35.56
4 × 100 m mixed medley relay	Israel; Anastasia Gorbenko (59.44); Ron Polonsky (59.80); Gal Cohen Groumi (51.90); Andrea Murez (54.60); Ayla Spitz; Jonathan Itzhaki; Ariel Hayon; Alexey Glivinskiy	3:45.74	Germany; Maya Werner (1:02.77); Melvin Imoudu (59.09); Luca Armbruster (51.51); Nina Jazy (54.75); Noel de Geus; Bjorn Kammann	3:48.12	Hungary; Hubert Kós (53.71); Eszter Békési (1:09.05); Richárd Márton (51.75); Petra Senánszky (54.28); Ádám Jászó	3:48.79

=== Diving ===
==== Medal table ====
After all 13 events.

* Host nation (Serbia)

Rank	Nation	Gold	Silver	Bronze	Total
1	Great Britain	4	0	3	7
2	Spain	3	3	0	6
3	France	2	1	2	5
4	Sweden	1	2	1	4
4	Ukraine	1	2	1	4
6	Poland	1	1	1	3
7	Austria	1	0	0	1
8	Italy	0	3	1	4
9	Germany	0	1	2	3
10	Norway	0	1	0	1
11	Ireland	0	0	1	1
Totals (11 entries)		13	14	12	39

==== Men ====
Event	Gold		Silver		Bronze	
1 m springboard	Andrzej Rzeszutek; Poland	394.40	Matteo Santoro; Italy	391.70	Stefano Belotti; Italy	370.50
3 m springboard	Gwendal Bisch; France	440.75	Matteo Santoro; Italy	431.55	Matthew Dixon; Great Britain	431.15
3 m springboard synchro	France; Jules Bouyer; Alexis Jandard	404.52	Spain; Juan Pablo Cortes; Nicolás García	379.08	Poland; Kacper Lesiak; Andrzej Rzeszutek	375.24
10 m platform	Robbie Lee; Great Britain	489.45	Carlos Camacho del Hoyo; Spain	432.70	Ben Cutmore; Great Britain	429.90
10 m platform synchro	Austria; Anton Knoll; Dariush Lotfi	367.05	Italy; Francesco Casalini; Julian Verzotto	356.88	Great Britain; Ben Cutmore; Euan McCabe	350.70

==== Women ====
Event	Gold		Silver		Bronze	
1 m springboard	Elna Widerström; Sweden	250.25	Aleksandra Błażowska; Poland	231.35	Emilia Nilsson Garip; Sweden	230.15
3 m springboard	Desharne Bent-Ashmeil; Great Britain	305.15	Helle Tuxen; Norway	243.20	Clare Cryan; Ireland	240.55
3 m springboard synchro	Great Britain; Desharne Bent-Ashmeil; Amy Rollinson	269.10	Sweden; Nina Janmyr; Elna Widerström	258.75	France; Naïs Gillet; Juliette Landi	243.33
10 m platform	Ana Carvajal; Spain	287.90	Emily Hallifax; France Sofiia Lyskun; Ukraine	278.10	not awarded	
10 m platform synchro	Ukraine; Kseniia Bailo; Sofiia Lyskun	288.78	Spain; Valeria Antolino; Ana Carvajal	260.67	France; Jade Gillet; Naïs Gillet	240.60

==== Mixed events ====
Event	Gold		Silver		Bronze	
Mixed 3 m springboard synchro	Great Britain; Ben Cutmore; Desharne Bent-Ashmeil	268.50	Sweden; Elias Petersen; Emilia Nilsson Garip	261.42	Germany; Lou Massenberg; Jana Lisa Rother	260.85
Mixed 10 m platform synchro	Spain; Carlos Camacho; Valeria Antolino	274.50	Germany; Tom Waldsteiner; Carolina Coordes	266.34	Ukraine; Marko Barsukov; Kseniia Bailo	256.02
Team event	Spain; Valeria Antolino; Carlos Camacho; Juan Pablo Cortés	367.65	Ukraine; Danylo Avanesov; Stanislav Oliferchyk; Karina Hlyzhina; Anna Pysmenska	357.00	Germany; Carolina Coordes; Jana Lisa Rother; Lou Massenberg; Luis Avila Sanchez	352.30

=== Open water swimming ===
==== Medal table ====
After all 7 events.

* Host nation (Serbia)

Rank	Nation	Gold	Silver	Bronze	Total
1	Italy	3	4	2	9
2	Germany	2	1	0	3
3	Hungary	2	0	2	4
4	France	0	2	2	4
5	Spain	0	0	1	1
Totals (5 entries)		7	7	7	21

==== Men ====
Event	Gold		Silver		Bronze	
5 km	Dávid Betlehem; Hungary	53:28.3	Marc-Antoine Olivier; France	53:28.7	Marcello Guidi; Italy	53:30.8
10 km	Gregorio Paltrinieri; Italy	1:49:19.6	Marc-Antoine Olivier; France	1:49:41.0	Dávid Betlehem; Hungary	1:49:41.2
25 km	Dario Verani; Italy	5:08:50.9	Matteo Furlan; Italy	5:08:56.6	Axel Reymond; France	5:09:00.5

==== Women ====
Event	Gold		Silver		Bronze	
5 km	Leonie Beck; Germany	58:25.3	Ginevra Taddeucci; Italy	58:26.5	Bettina Fábián; Hungary	58:28.7
10 km	Leonie Beck; Germany	2:00:54.8	Barbara Pozzobon; Italy	2:00:54.9	Giulia Gabbrielleschi; Italy	2:00:58.5
25 km	Barbara Pozzobon; Italy	5:25:37.7	Lea Boy; Germany	5:28:39.6	Candela Sánchez; Spain	5:29:15.2

==== Mixed events ====
Event	Gold		Silver		Bronze	
Team event	Hungary; Mira Szimcsák; Bettina Fábián; Dávid Betlehem; Kristóf Rasovszky	1:06:07.7	Italy; Giulia Gabbrielleschi; Ginevra Taddeucci; Andrea Filadelli; Marcello Guidi	1:06:28.6	France; Caroline Jouisse; Océane Cassignol; Sacha Velly; Marc-Antoine Olivier	1:06:51.7

=== Artistic swimming ===
==== Medal table ====
After all 11 events.

* Host nation (Serbia)

Rank	Nation	Gold	Silver	Bronze	Total
1	Spain	4	0	0	4
2	Netherlands	2	0	2	4
3	Austria	2	0	0	2
4	Great Britain	1	3	3	7
5	Germany	1	2	0	3
5	Greece	1	2	0	3
7	Italy	0	4	3	7
8	Israel	0	0	2	2
9	France	0	0	1	1
Totals (9 entries)		11	11	11	33

==== Men ====
Event	Gold		Silver		Bronze	
Solo free routine	Ranjuo Tomblin; Great Britain	191.0293	Giorgio Minisini; Italy	183.5313	Quentin Rakotomalala; France	174.4708
Solo technical routine	Dennis González; Spain	225.8466	Ranjuo Tomblin; Great Britain	204.4466	Giorgio Minisini; Italy	185.9800

==== Women ====
Event	Gold		Silver		Bronze	
Solo free routine	Vasiliki Alexandri; Austria	257.4959	Klara Bleyer; Germany	253.4772	Marloes Steenbeek; Netherlands	238.1667
Solo technical routine	Vasiliki Alexandri; Austria	260.5967	Klara Bleyer; Germany	242.9617	Marloes Steenbeek; Netherlands	240.4816
Duet free routine	Netherlands; Bregje de Brouwer; Noortje de Brouwer	264.6584	Great Britain; Kate Shortman; Isabelle Thorpe	261.0313	Israel; Shelly Bobritsky; Ariel Nassee	245.6105
Duet technical routine	Netherlands; Bregje de Brouwer; Noortje de Brouwer	260.6567	Great Britain; Kate Shortman; Isabelle Thorpe	256.7184	Israel; Shelly Bobritsky; Ariel Nassee	243.6250

==== Mixed ====
Event	Gold		Silver		Bronze	
Duet free routine	Spain; Emma García; Dennis González	189.7938	Italy; Flaminia Vernice; Filippo Pelati	188.6250	Great Britain; Beatrice Crass; Ranjuo Tomblin	175.1563
Duet technical routine	Spain; Mireia Hernández; Dennis González	218.7658	Italy; Sarah Maria Rizea; Filippo Pelati	217.1633	Great Britain; Beatrice Crass; Ranjuo Tomblin	202.9817

==== Team ====
Event	Gold		Silver		Bronze	
Acrobatic routine	Germany; Klara Bleyer; Amelie Blumenthal Haz; Maria Denisov; Solène Guisard; Daria Martens; Susana Rovner; Frithjof Seidel; Daria Tonn	192.7166	Greece; Maria Alzigkouzi Kominea; Thaleia Dampali; Athina Kamarinopoulou; Zoi Karangelou; Maria Karapanagiotou; Artemi Koutraki; Ifigeneia Krommydaki; Vasiliki Thanou	191.8100	Italy; Beatrice Andina; Valentina Bisi; Beatrice Esegio; Alessia Macchi; Giorgia Lucia Macino; Marta Murru; Carmen Rocchino; Sophie Tabbiani	159.2966
Free routine	Greece; Maria Alzigkouzi Kominea; Thaleia Dampali; Athina Kamarinopoulou; Zoi Karangelou; Maria Karapanagiotou; Artemi Koutraki; Ifigeneia Krommydaki; Vasiliki Thanou	270.1980	Italy; Beatrice Andina; Valentina Bisi; Beatrice Esegio; Alessia Macchi; Giorgia Lucia Macino; Marta Murru; Carmen Rocchino; Sophie Tabbiani	254.7354	Great Britain; Eleanor Blinkhorn; Florence Blinkhorn; Lily Halasi; Holly Hughes; Sophie Rowney; Robyn Swatman; Amelie Williams; Eve Young	219.0228
Technical routine	Spain; Cristina Arámbula; Meritxell Ferré; Marina García; Lilou Lluís; Meritxell Mas; Alisa Ozhogina; Iris Tió; Blanca Toledano	278.4684	Greece; Maria Alzigkouzi Kominea; Thaleia Dampali; Athina Kamarinopoulou; Zoi Karangelou; Maria Karapanagiotou; Ifigeneia Krommydaki; Sofia Rigakou; Vasiliki Thanou	257.8918	Italy; Beatrice Andina; Valentina Bisi; Beatrice Esegio; Alessia Macchi; Giorgia Lucia Macino; Marta Murru; Carmen Rocchino; Sophie Tabbiani	256.8584
