= Dominik Dudys =

Polish swimmer (born 2002)

Dominik Sebastian Dudys
Personal information
- Born: 23 August 2002 (age 24)

Sport
- Country: Poland
- Sport: Swimming
- Strokes: Freestyle
Medal record
Men's swimming
Representing Poland
World University Games
Gold medal – first place	2021 Chengdu	4×100 m freestyle
Silver medal – second place	2025 Rhine-Ruhr	4×100 m mixed medley

Dominik Sebastian Dudys (born 23 August 2002) is a Polish swimmer specializing in freestyle, and a silver medalist at the European Aquatics Championships.

== Career ==
In 2023, at the 2021 Summer Universiade in Chengdu, held in 2023 due to the COVID-19 pandemic. Dudys won a gold medal in the 4×100 m freestyle relay.

At the 2024 European Aquatics Championships in Belgrade in June 2024, he won four silver medals in the men's and mixed freestyle relays (4×100 m and 4×200 m) and in the men's 4×100 m medley relay.
