= Alexander Trampitsch =

Austrian swimmer

Personal information
- Nationality: Austrian
- Born: 5 February 1999 (age 27)

Sport
- Sport: Swimming

Alexander Trampitsch (born 5 February 1999) is an Austrian swimmer. He competed in the men's 100 metre freestyle event at the 2018 FINA World Swimming Championships (25 m), in Hangzhou, China.
