= Andreas Vazaios =

Greek swimmer (born 1994)

Personal information
- National team: Greece
- Born: 9 May 1994 (age 32) Athens, Greece
- Height: 1.90 m (6 ft 3 in)
- Weight: 86 kg (190 lb)

Sport
- Sport: Swimming
- Strokes: Butterfly, Individual Medley, Freestyle
- Club: ANO Argyroupoli; OFN Ionias
- College team: NC State University (NCSU)
- Coach: Braden Holloway (NCSU)
Medal record
Men's swimming
Representing Greece
Event	1st	2nd	3rd
European Championships (LC)	1	0	1
European Championships (SC)	3	3	4
Mediterranean Games	3	5	3
European Junior Championships	1	1	1
World Junior Championships	0	2	0
Total	8	11	9
European Championships (LC)
Gold medal – first place	2016 London	200 m medley
Bronze medal – third place	2024 Belgrade	4x100 m freestyle
Bronze medal – third place	2024 Belgrade	4x200 m freestyle
European Championships (SC)
Gold medal – first place	2019 Glasgow	200 m butterfly
Gold medal – first place	2019 Glasgow	200 m medley
Gold medal – first place	2021 Kazan	200 m medley
Silver medal – second place	2017 Copenhagen	200 m butterfly
Silver medal – second place	2017 Copenhagen	200 m medley
Silver medal – second place	2021 Kazan	100 m medley
Bronze medal – third place	2015 Netanya	100 m medley
Bronze medal – third place	2019 Glasgow	100 m medley
Bronze medal – third place	2023 Otopeni	4×50 m freestyle
Bronze medal – third place	2023 Otopeni	100 m medley
Mediterranean Games
Gold medal – first place	2018 Tarragona	200 m medley
Gold medal – first place	2022 Oran	200 m medley
Gold medal – first place	2022 Oran	4×200 m freestyle
Silver medal – second place	2013 Mersin	4x100 m medley
Silver medal – second place	2018 Tarragona	4×100 m freestyle
Silver medal – second place	2022 Oran	200 m butterfly
Silver medal – second place	2022 Oran	4×100 m freestyle
Silver medal – second place	2026 Taranto	4×100 m mixed medley
Bronze medal – third place	2013 Mersin	200 m medley
Bronze medal – third place	2018 Tarragona	200 m butterfly
Bronze medal – third place	2026 Taranto	100 m freestyle
European Junior Championships
Gold medal – first place	2012 Antwerp	100 m butterfly
Silver medal – second place	2012 Antwerp	200 m medley
Bronze medal – third place	2011 Belgrade	200 m medley
World Junior Championships
Silver medal – second place	2011 Lima	200 m butterfly
Silver medal – second place	2011 Lima	200 m medley
Representing the NC State Wolfpack
Event	1st	2nd	3rd
NCAA Championships	4	3	1
Total	4	3	1
By race
Event	1st	2nd	3rd
100 y backstroke	0	0	1
200 y butterfly	2	0	0
200 y medley	0	2	0
4×200 y freestyle	2	1	0
Total	4	3	1
NCAA Championships
Gold medal – first place	2017 Indianapolis	4×200 y freestyle
Gold medal – first place	2018 Minneapolis	200 y butterfly
Gold medal – first place	2018 Minneapolis	4×200 y freestyle
Gold medal – first place	2019 Austin	200 y butterfly
Silver medal – second place	2018 Minneapolis	200 y medley
Silver medal – second place	2019 Austin	200 y medley
Silver medal – second place	2019 Austin	4×200 y freestyle
Bronze medal – third place	2018 Minneapolis	100 y backstroke

Andreas Vazaios (Greek: Ανδρέας Βαζαίος; born 9 May 1994 in Athens) is a Greek swimmer who competed for North Carolina State University under Head Coach Braden Holloway and participated in the 2012, 2016, 2020, and 2024 Summer Olympics. An outstanding international competitor, he won 13 medals in the European Long and Short Course Championships from 2016 to 2023 including four golds in butterfly and medley events. As a collegiate swimmer for North Carolina State University, he placed 8 times in the NCAA Championships between 2017 and 2019 with four first-place finishes in freestyle and butterfly events.

== Olympics ==
Vazaios competed for Greece in each of the Olympics from 2012 to 2024. He first competed for Greece in the 200 m individual medley event at the 2012 Summer Olympics in London where he was eliminated after the qualifying heats.

At the 2016 Summer Olympics in Rio de Janeiro, he participated in the men's 200 m individual medley event. He finished 9th in the heats with a time of 1:59.33. He qualified for the semifinals where he placed 11th overall with a time of 1:59.54 and did not qualify for the final. He was a member of the men's 4 x 100 meter medley relay team which finished 8th in the second heat and 15th overall with a combined time of 3:36.75 and did not advance to the finals.

Vazaios competed in the 2020 Summer Olympics in Tokyo where he finished 15th overall in the 4x100-meter freestyle relay with a time of 3:15.29, 24th overall in the 200-meter individual medley with a time of 1:58.84, and 14th overall in the 4x100-meter medley relay with a time of 3:36.28.

He also represented Greece in the Paris Olympics in 2024 in Heat 2 of the 4x200 freestyle relay with the team of Konstantinos Englezakis, Dimitris Markos, and Konstantinos Stamou, but placed fifth among stiff competition, and did not make the finals, finishing behind the British, Australians, Chinese, and Italian teams.

Vazaios set a European record in Glasgow, Great Britain in the 200 m medley on 6 December 2019 of 1:50.85.

== North Carolina State ==
During his college years, Vazaios attended North Carolina State University where he swam primarily for Coach Braden Holloway, and briefly for Todd DeSorbo in 2017. Vazaios was an All-American thirteen times at North Carolina State, captured Atlantic Coast Conference titles six times and won the 2018 Men's Swimmer of the Year for the ACC.

In 2019, while at NCSU, Andreas was named a 2019 Atlantic Coast Conference Scholar-Athlete of the Year in the men's division, and had been named an Academic All American in several years.

=== Post-college years ===
In 2020, he received an NCAA Postgraduate Scholarship, and worked towards an MA degree at the United Kingdom's Loughborough University in Sports and Exercise Psychology. He swam for a period with Loughborough University's team, while continuing to train for international competition.

Andreas Vazaios was a member of the London Roar team, competing in Season 2 of the International Swimming League (ISL). The ISL is an annual professional swimming league featuring a team-based competition format with fast-paced race sessions.
