= Kamil Sieradzki =

Polish swimmer

Personal information
- Nationality: Polish
- Born: 11 January 2002 (age 24)

Sport
- Sport: Swimming
Medal record
Men's swimming
Representing Poland
World Championships (SC)
Bronze medal – third place	2024 Budapest	4×100 m freestyle
Bronze medal – third place	2024 Budapest	4×50 m mixed freestyle
European Championships (LC)
Silver medal – second place	2024 Belgrade	4×100 m medley
Silver medal – second place	2024 Belgrade	4×100 m mixed freestyle
Silver medal – second place	2024 Belgrade	4×200 m mixed freestyle
European Championships (SC)
Silver medal – second place	2025 Lublin	4×50 m freestyle
Bronze medal – third place	2025 Lublin	200 m freestyle
World University Games
Gold medal – first place	2021 Chengdu	100 m freestyle
Gold medal – first place	2021 Chengdu	200 m freestyle
Gold medal – first place	2021 Chengdu	4×100 m freestyle

Kamil Sieradzki (born 11 January 2002) is a Polish swimmer. He competed in the men's 4 × 200 metre freestyle relay at the 2020 Summer Olympics.
