= Dimitrios Markos =

Greek swimmer (born 2001)

Personal information
- Nationality: Greek
- Born: 13 September 2001 (age 24) Athens, Greece

Sport
- Sport: Swimming
- Club: P.A.O.K.
Medal record
Men's swimming
Representing Greece
European Championships (LC)
Silver medal – second place	2024 Belgrade	400 m freestyle
Silver medal – second place	2024 Belgrade	800 m freestyle
Bronze medal – third place	2024 Belgrade	4x200 m freestyle
European U-23 Championships
Gold medal – first place	2023 Dublin	200 m freestyle
Bronze medal – third place	2023 Dublin	400 m freestyle
Mediterranean Games
Gold medal – first place	2022 Oran	400 m freestyle
Gold medal – first place	2022 Oran	4×200 m freestyle
Gold medal – first place	2026 Taranto	400 m freestyle
Silver medal – second place	2022 Oran	200 m freestyle
Silver medal – second place	2022 Oran	1500 m freestyle
Silver medal – second place	2022 Oran	4×100 m freestyle
Silver medal – second place	2026 Taranto	800 m freestyle
Bronze medal – third place	2026 Taranto	200 m freestyle

Dimitrios Markos (Greek: Δημητριος Μαρκος; born 13 September 2001) is a Greek swimmer. He is the current National Record holder in the 400m freestyle with a time of 03:47.07 and in the 800m freestyle with a time of 07:43.52.

== Career ==
He is part of club team ANO Argyroupolis and is coached by Alexandros Moraris.

He competed in the men's 200 metre freestyle at the 2020 Summer Olympics.

He qualified for the 2024 Olympics in the 800 freestyle. In Paris, he also competed in the 1500 freestyle and the 4x200 freestyle relay.
