= Yordan Yanchev =

Bulgarian swimmer

Personal information
- Nationality: Bulgarian
- Born: 30 August 2001 (age 24)

Sport
- Sport: Swimming

Yordan Yanchev (born 30 August 2001) is a Bulgarian swimmer. He competed in the men's 200 metre freestyle event at the 2018 FINA World Swimming Championships (25 m), in Hangzhou, China.
