= Kristupas Trepočka =

Lithuanian swimmer

Personal information
- Nationality: Lithuanian
- Born: 22 May 2006 (age 20) Panevėžys, Lithuania

Sport
- Sport: Swimming
- Strokes: freestyle
- Club: Panevėžio Žemyna
Medal record
Men's swimming
Representing Lithuania
Event	1st	2nd	3rd
European Championships (LC)	1	0	0
European Junior Championships	1	0	2
Total	2	0	2
European Championships (LC)
Gold medal – first place	2024 Belgrade	4x200 m freestyle
European Junior Championships
Gold medal – first place	2024 Vilnius	200 m freestyle
Bronze medal – third place	2023 Belgrade	4×100 m freestyle
Bronze medal – third place	2024 Vilnius	Mixed 4×100 m medley

Kristupas Trepočka (born 22 May 2006) is a Lithuanian swimmer. He is European champion in men's 4 × 200 m freestyle relay.

== International championships (50 m) ==
Meet	200 free	4×200 free
EC 2024	24	1
