= Konstantinos Englezakis =

Greek swimmer

Personal information
- Born: March 20, 2001 (age 25) Athens, Greece

Sport
- Sport: Swimming
Medal record
Men's swimming
Representing Greece
European Championships (LC)
Bronze medal – third place	2024 Belgrade	4x200 m freestyle

Konstantinos Englezakis (born 20 March 2001) is a Greek swimmer. He has qualified to represent Greece at the 2020 Summer Olympics in the men's 800 metre freestyle event.
