= Mateusz Chowaniec =

Polish swimmer

Personal information
- Born: 3 October 2003 (age 22) Katowice, Poland
- Height: 1.85 m (6 ft 1 in)

Sport
- Country: Poland
- Sport: Swimming
- Strokes: Freestyle
Medal record
Men's swimming
Representing Poland
European Championships (SC)
Silver medal – second place	2025 Lublin	4×50 m freestyle
European Youth Olympic Festival
Gold medal – first place	2019 Baku	50 m freestyle

Mateusz Chowaniec (born 3 October 2003 in Katowice) is a Polish swimmer and double European Championship silver medalist.

== Career ==
Chowaniec began his swimming career at Wodnik Siemianowice Śląskie and, since 2023, has been competing for AZS-AWF Katowice.

In 2019, he won a gold medal in the 50-meter freestyle at the Summer European Youth Olympic Festival. In 2021, he became the European Junior Vice-Champion in the 200-meter freestyle. He was a candidate for the Tokyo 2020 Olympics, but was incorrectly registered and not allowed to compete. In 2023, he won a gold medal in the 4 × 100-meter freestyle relay and a bronze medal in the 100-meter freestyle at the Summer Universiade.

He is the Polish senior record holder in the mixed 4 × 200-meter freestyle relay (7:41.29 - 16 August 2022 at the European Championships in Rome).

At the Polish Senior Championships, he won a bronze medal in the 100-meter butterfly in 2022, and in 2023, he won a gold medal in the 4 × 100-meter relay and a silver medal in the 100-meter freestyle.
