= César Castro (swimmer) =

Spanish swimmer

Personal information
- Full name: César Castro Valle
- Nationality: Spanish
- Born: 31 May 1999 (age 27) Plasencia, Spain

Sport
- Sport: Swimming
Medal record
Men's swimming
Representing Spain
European Youth Olympic Festival
Gold medal – first place	2015 Tbilisi	1500 m freestyle
Gold medal – first place	2015 Tbilisi	4x100 m mixed freestyle
Silver medal – second place	2015 Tbilisi	400 m freestyle

César Castro Valle (Note: In this Spanish name, the first or paternal surname is Castro and the second or maternal family name is Valle.) (born 31 May 1999) is a Spanish swimmer. He competed in the men's 200 metre freestyle event at the 2020 European Aquatics Championships, in Budapest, Hungary.
