= Tomas Navikonis =

Lithuanian swimmer

Personal information
- Nationality: Lithuanian
- Born: 12 April 2003 (age 23) Panevėžys, Lithuania
- Height: 2.09 m (6 ft 10 in)

Sport
- Sport: Swimming
- Strokes: freestyle
- Club: Panevėžio Žemyna; Ohio State University
Medal record
Men's swimming
Representing Lithuania
Event	1st	2nd	3rd
European Championships (LC)	1	1	0
Universiade	0	1	0
Total	1	2	0
European Championships (LC)
Gold medal – first place	2024 Belgrade	4x200 m freestyle
Silver medal – second place	2026 Paris	200 m freestyle
Summer Universiade
Silver medal – second place	2021 Chengdu	200 m freestyle

Tomas Navikonis (born 12 April 2003) is a Lithuanian swimmer. He is European champion in men's 4 × 200 m freestyle relay. In 2022, Navikonis joined Ohio State University swimming team.

At the 2024 Summer Olympics in Paris, Navikonis made his Olympic debut, representing Lithuania as a key member of the men's 4 × 200 m freestyle relay team.

His individual breakthrough on the senior continental stage came at the 2026 European Aquatics Championships in Paris. Navikonis captured his first individual major international podium by winning the silver medal in the 200 m freestyle with a personal best time of 1:44.55, finishing just behind Romania's David Popovici. At the same championships, he also reached the final in the 100 m freestyle, finishing 8th overall, and helped the Lithuanian mixed 4 × 200 m freestyle relay team secure a strong 4th-place finish.

== International championships (50 m) ==
Meet	100 free	200 free	4×100 free	4×200 free	4×200 mixed free
WC 2024			13	7	—N/a
EC 2024	10	9		1st place, gold medalist(s)	
OG 2024				15	—N/a
WC 2025			7		—N/a
EC 2026	8	2nd place, silver medalist(s)		5	4
