= Tomas Lukminas =

Lithuanian swimmer

Personal information
- Nationality: Lithuanian
- Born: 26 October 2004 (age 21) Panevėžys, Lithuania

Sport
- Sport: Swimming
- Strokes: freestyle
- Club: Panevėžio Žemyna
Medal record
Men's swimming
Representing Lithuania
Event	1st	2nd	3rd
European Championships (LC)	1	0	0
World Junior Championships	0	0	1
Total	1	0	1
European Championships (LC)
Gold medal – first place	2024 Belgrade	4x200 m freestyle
World Junior Championships
Bronze medal – third place	2022 Lima	4×100 m freestyle

Tomas Lukminas (born 26 October 2004) is a Lithuanian swimmer. He is European champion in men's 4 × 200 m freestyle relay.

== International championships (50 m) ==
Meet	100 free	200 free	4×100 free	4×200 free
WC 2024	23		13	7
EC 2024	24	17		1
