= Swimming at the 2026 European Aquatics Championships – Women's 200 metre freestyle =

Women's 200 metre freestyle at the 2026 European Aquatics Championships
- Venue: Paris Aquatic Centre
- Dates: 12 August (heats and semifinals); 13 August (final)
- Competitors: 45 from 23 nations
- Winning time: 1:54.38 CR

Medalists
gold medal	Barbora Seemanová	Czech Republic
silver medal	Marrit Steenbergen	Netherlands
bronze medal	Freya Colbert	Great Britain

The Women's 200 metre freestyle competition of the 2026 European Aquatics Championships was held on 12 and 13 August 2026.

== Records ==
Prior to the competition, the existing world, European and championship records were as follows:

Record	Time	Swimmer	Location	Date
World record	1:52.23	Ariarne Titmus (AUS)	(Australia) Brisbane	12 June 2024
European record	1:52.98	Federica Pellegrini (ITA)	(Italy) Rome	29 July 2009
Championship record	1:54.95	Charlotte Bonnet (FRA)	(United Kingdom) Glasgow	6 August 2018
World Jr record	1:53.65	Summer McIntosh (CAN)	(Japan) Fukuoka	26 July 2023
European Jr record	1:56.14	Nikolett Pádár (HUN)	(France) Paris	1 August 2024

== Results ==
=== Heats ===
The heats were started on 12 August at 09:30.

Rank	Heat	Lane	Swimmer	Nation	Time	Notes
1	4	4	Barbora Seemanová	Czech Republic	1:57.10	Q
2	4	8	Ieva Jurkūnaitė	Lithuania	1:57.28	Q, NR
3	4	6	Linda Roth	Germany	1:57.60	Q
4	3	4	Marrit Steenbergen	Netherlands	1:58.00	Q
5	3	6	Sarah Dumont	Belgium	1:58.40	Q
6	4	7	Ainhoa Campabadal	Spain	1:58.46	Q
7	5	7	Francisca Martins	Portugal	1:58.56	Q
8	4	2	Bianca Nannucci	Italy	1:58.63	Q
9	5	4	Freya Colbert	Great Britain	1:58.66	Q
10	2	4	Daria Golovaty	Israel	1:58.72	Q
11	5	1	Anna Chiara Mascolo	Italy	1:58.73	Q
12	5	5	Nikolett Pádár	Hungary	1:58.81	Q
13	5	2	Imani de Jong	Netherlands	1:58.92	Q
14	4	3	Maya Tobehn	Germany	1:58.95	Q
15	5	6	Leah Schlosshan	Great Britain	1:59.13	Q
16	3	7	Iris Julia Berger	Austria	1:59.19	Q
17	4	1	Milana Stepanova	Neutral Athletes B	1:59.25	
18	3	8	Matilde Biagiotti	Italy	1:59.28	
19	3	3	Panna Ugrai	Hungary	1:59.31	
20	5	3	María Daza	Spain	1:59.36	
21	4	0	Zuzanna Famulok	Poland	1:59.37	
22	3	2	Nicole Maier	Germany	1:59.38	
23	3	9	Grace Davison	Ireland	1:59.48	
24	5	9	Sofia Åstedt	Sweden	1:59.61	
25	2	3	Elvira Mörtstrand	Sweden	1:59.79	
26	2	5	Bea Hovda	Norway	1:59.91	
27	3	0	Lea Polonsky	Israel	1:59.92	
28	5	8	Sylvia Statkevičius	Lithuania	1:59.99	
29	3	1	Nina Jane Holt	Germany	2:00.03	
30	1	5	Schastine Tabor	Denmark	2:01.02	
31	1	7	Marlene Kahler	Austria	2:01.28	
32	1	6	Danielle Farrell	Ireland	2:01.56	
33	4	9	Siri Vanderlinden	Belgium	2:01.61	
34	2	2	Victoria Catterson	Ireland	2:02.38	
35	2	6	Nynke Boerefijn	Netherlands	2:02.58	
36	1	1	Vanna Djakovic	Switzerland	2:03.06	
37	2	1	Gaia Rasmussen	Switzerland	2:03.25	
38	1	2	Manon Richard	Switzerland	2:03.47	
39	2	8	Iman Avdić	Bosnia and Herzegovina	2:03.52	
40	2	9	Ieva Nainytė	Lithuania	2:03.67	
41	1	8	Nida Omid	Austria	2:03.77	
42	1	3	Ieva Visockaitė	Lithuania	2:03.99	
43	2	0	Vala Dís Cicero	Iceland	2:05.34	
44	1	0	Lou Jominet	Luxembourg	2:07.65	
45	1	9	Riga Shala	Kosovo	2:18.70	
	1	4	Thilda Hall	Sweden	Did not start	
	2	7	Femke Spiering	Netherlands	Did not start	
	3	5	Alessandra Mao	Italy	Did not start	
	4	5	Freya Anderson	Great Britain	Did not start	
	5	0	Daria Surushkina	Neutral Athletes B	Did not start	

=== Semifinals ===
The semifinals were started on 12 August at 18:30.

Rank	Heat	Lane	Swimmer	Nation	Time	Notes
1	2	4	Barbora Seemanová	Czech Republic	1:55.77	Q
2	2	2	Freya Colbert	Great Britain	1:56.28	Q
3	1	5	Marrit Steenbergen	Netherlands	1:56.35	Q
4	2	5	Linda Roth	Germany	1:56.46	Q
5	2	3	Sarah Dumont	Belgium	1:56.52	Q
6	1	4	Ieva Jurkūnaitė	Lithuania	1:56.90	Q, NR
7	1	7	Nikolett Pádár	Hungary	1:57.24	Q
8	2	6	Francisca Martins	Portugal	1:57.56	Q
8	2	8	Leah Schlosshan	Great Britain	1:57.56	Q
10	1	3	Ainhoa Campabadal	Spain	1:57.88	
11	1	6	Bianca Nannucci	Italy	1:58.04	
12	2	1	Imani de Jong	Netherlands	1:58.12	
13	1	1	Maya Tobehn	Germany	1:58.22	
14	1	2	Daria Golovaty	Israel	1:58.45	
15	2	7	Anna Chiara Mascolo	Italy	1:58.81	
16	1	8	Iris Julia Berger	Austria	1:58.83	

=== Final ===
The final was held on 13 August at 19:35.

Rank	Lane	Swimmer	Nation	Time	Notes
1st place, gold medalist(s)	4	Barbora Seemanová	Czech Republic	1:54.38	CR, NR
2nd place, silver medalist(s)	3	Marrit Steenbergen	Netherlands	1:54.65	NR
3rd place, bronze medalist(s)	5	Freya Colbert	Great Britain	1:55.81	
4	6	Linda Roth	Germany	1:56.71	
5	7	Ieva Jurkūnaitė	Lithuania	1:57.26	
6	1	Nikolett Pádár	Hungary	1:57.29	
7	2	Sarah Dumont	Belgium	1:57.43	
8	8	Leah Schlosshan	Great Britain	1:57.48	
9	0	Francisca Martins	Portugal	1:58.18	
