= Swimming at the 2025 World Aquatics Championships – Women's 4 × 100 metre medley relay =

Women's 4 × 100 metre medley relay at the 2025 World Aquatics Championships
- Venue: World Aquatics Championships Arena
- Location: Singapore Sports Hub, Kallang
- Dates: 3 August
- Competitors: 92 from 20 nations
- Teams: 20
- Winning time: 3:49.34

Medalists
gold medal	Regan Smith; Kate Douglass; Gretchen Walsh; Torri Huske; Katharine Berkoff; Lilly King; Claire Curzan; Simone Manuel	United States
silver medal	Kaylee McKeown; Ella Ramsay; Alexandria Perkins; Mollie O'Callaghan; Sienna Toohey	Australia
bronze medal	Peng Xuwei; Tang Qianting; Zhang Yufei; Cheng Yujie; Wan Letian; Yang Chang; Yu Yiting; Wu Qingfeng	China

The women's 4 × 100 metre medley relay at the 2025 World Aquatics Championships was held on 3 August 2025 at the World Aquatics Championships Arena at the Singapore Sports Hub in Kallang, Singapore.

== Background ==
The United States will likely return their World Record and defending Olympic team. The team will likely be made up of Regan Smith, who holds the 100 metre backstroke world record; Gretchen Walsh, who holds the 100 metre butterfly world record; either Lilly King, or Kate Douglass on breaststroke; and Torri Huske. Projections suggest a time near 3:47.74, which would break their 3:49.63 record.

Australia, silver medallists at the 2024 Olympics, will likely feature Kaylee McKeown, Sienna Toohey, and Mollie O’Callaghan, while China, led by Tang Qianting and Zhang Yufei, will challenge them for silver. Canada, Japan, France, the Netherlands, Germany, and Great Britain are expected to target finals rather than medals.

== Qualification ==
Each National Federation could enter one team in the relay. The team had to be composed of swimmers who were also competing in the individual events, along with relay only swimmers who had to have met a specific qualifying time for the corresponding stroke and distance they would be swimming in the relay. Federations were only allowed to enter two relay-only swimmers for each relay they entered, though they could also enter relay-only swimmers from other relays which did not count toward this limitation.

== Records ==
Prior to the competition, the existing world and championship records were as follows.

World record	United States	3:49.63	Paris, France	4 August 2024
Competition record	United States	3:50.40	Gwangju, South Korea	28 July 2019

The following new records were set during this competition.

Date	Event	Nation	Time	Record
3 August	Final	United States	3:49.34	WR

== Heats ==
Heats took place at 11:08.

Rank	Heat	Lane	Nation	Swimmers	Time	Notes
1	3	4	United States	Katharine Berkoff (58.29); Lilly King (1:06.46); Claire Curzan (56.90); Simone Manuel (52.84)	3:54.49	Q
2	2	4	Australia	Kaylee McKeown (59.06); Sienna Toohey (1:06.95); Alexandria Perkins (56.73); Mollie O'Callaghan (53.06)	3:55.80	Q
3	3	2	Germany	Lise Seidel (1:00.98); Anna Elendt (1:05.34); Angelina Köhler (56.27); Nina Holt (53.85)	3:56.44	Q
4	3	5	China	Wan Letian (59.87); Yang Chang (1:06.49); Yu Yiting (57.18); Wu Qingfeng (53.16)	3:56.70	Q
5	3	3	Japan	Miki Takahashi (1:01.01); Satomi Suzuki (1:05.50); Mizuki Hirai (56.45); Nagisa Ikemoto (53.89)	3:56.85	Q
6	2	5	Canada	Kylie Masse (59.37); Sophie Angus (1:06.72); Ella Jansen (58.60); Mary-Sophie Harvey (53.63)	3:58.32	Q
7	2	2	Great Britain	Lauren Cox (1:00.08); Angharad Evans (1:06.03); Emily Richards (58.88); Freya Anderson (54.01)	3:59.00	Q
8	1	3	Neutral Athletes B	Alina Gaifutdinova (1:00.12); Evgeniia Chikunova (1:06.71); Arina Surkova (57.81); Milana Stepanova (54.72)	3:59.36	Q
9	1	4	South Africa	Olivia Nel (1:00.33 NR); Rebecca Meder (1:07.63); Erin Gallagher (57.31); Aimee Canny (54.20)	3:59.47	AF
10	3	8	Italy	Anita Gastaldi (1:00.95); Lisa Angiolini (1:07.45); Costanza Cocconcelli (57.60); Emma Virginia Menicucci (54.12)	4:00.12	
11	3	6	Sweden	Hanna Rosvall (1:01.79); Sophie Hansson (1:07.30); Louise Hansson (56.92); Sofia Åstedt (54.30)	4:00.31	
12	2	7	Hungary	Dóra Molnár (1:02.04); Henrietta Fangli (1:06.63); Panna Ugrai (58.21); Lilla Minna Ábrahám (54.34)	4:01.22	NR
13	3	1	Denmark	Schastine Tabor (1:01.72); Clara Rybak-Andersen (1:07.24); Helena Rosendahl Bach (58.12); Julie Kepp Jensen (54.62)	4:01.70	
14	3	9	Israel	Aviv Barzelay (1:02.10); Anastasia Gorbenko (1:06.49); Arielle Hayon (58.59); Lea Polonsky (55.25)	4:02.43	NR
15	1	5	South Korea	Kim Seung-won (1:00.29); Ko Ha-ru (1:08.97); Kim Do-yeon (59.56); Hur Yeon-kyung (55.54)	4:04.36	
16	3	7	Poland	Adela Piskorska (1:01.81); Barbara Mazurkiewicz (1:07.65); Zuzanna Famulok (1:00.02); Wiktoria Guść (55.92)	4:05.40	
17	2	0	Spain	Carmen Weiler (1:00.69); Jimena Ruiz (1:10.12); Laura Cabanes (59.51); Maria Daza Garcia (55.17)	4:05.49	
18	2	8	Greece	Theodora Drakou (1:01.46); Nikoletta Pavlopoulou (1:10.82); Georgia Damasioti (58.67); Anna Ntountounaki (55.25)	4:06.20	
19	3	0	Singapore	Levenia Sim (1:03.39); Letitia Sim (1:07.87); Quah Jing Wen (59.21); Quah Ting Wen (56.25)	4:06.72	
20	2	1	Hong Kong	Sum Yuet Cindy Cheung (1:02.93); Candice Gao (1:12.64); Hoi Ching Yeung (1:00.63); Li Sum Yiu (55.38)	4:11.58	
	2	6	Netherlands	Did not start		

== Final ==
The final took place at 20:49.

Rank	Lane	Nation	Swimmers	Time	Notes
1st place, gold medalist(s)	4	United States	Regan Smith (57.57); Kate Douglass (1:04.27); Gretchen Walsh (54.98); Torri Huske (52.52)	3:49.34	WR
2nd place, silver medalist(s)	5	Australia	Kaylee McKeown (57.69); Ella Ramsay (1:06.49); Alexandria Perkins (56.26); Mollie O'Callaghan (52.23)	3:52.67	
3rd place, bronze medalist(s)	6	China	Peng Xuwei (59.94); Tang Qianting (1:05.48); Zhang Yufei (56.32); Cheng Yujie (53.03)	3:54.77	
4	8	Neutral Athletes B	Alina Gaifutdinova (59.87); Evgeniia Chikunova (1:06.19); Daria Klepikova (55.95); Daria Trofimova (53.16)	3:55.17	
5	7	Canada	Kylie Masse (58.77); Sophie Angus (1:06.52); Summer McIntosh (57.35); Taylor Ruck (52.99)	3:55.63	
6	3	Germany	Lise Seidel (1:01.02); Anna Elendt (1:04.90); Angelina Köhler (56.88); Nina Holt (53.22)	3:56.02	
7	2	Japan	Miki Takahashi (1:01.78); Satomi Suzuki (1:05.57); Mizuki Hirai (56.46); Nagisa Ikemoto (53.82)	3:57.63	
8	1	Great Britain	Lauren Cox (59.59); Angharad Evans (1:06.38); Emily Richards (58.12); Freya Anderson (53.86)	3:57.95	
