= Swimming at the 2024 European Aquatics Championships – Women's 100 metre freestyle =

Women's 100 metre freestyle at the 2024 European Aquatics Championships
- Venue: Sports Centre Milan Gale Muškatirović
- Dates: 17 June (heats and semifinals); 18 June (final)
- Competitors: 42 from 23 nations
- Winning time: 53.50

Medalists
gold medal	Barbora Seemanova	Czech Republic
silver medal	Barbora Janickova	Czech Republic
bronze medal	Nikolett Pádár	Hungary

The Women's 100 metre freestyle competition of the 2024 European Aquatics Championships was held on 17 and 18 June 2024.

== Records ==
Prior to the competition, the existing world, European and championship records were as follows.

	Name	Nationality	Time	Location	Date
World record European record	Sarah Sjöström	Sweden	51.71	Budapest	23 July 2017
Championship record	Sarah Sjöström	Sweden	52.67	Berlin	20 August 2014

== Results ==
=== Heats ===
The heats were started on 17 June at 09:42.
Qualification Rules: The 16 fastest from the heats qualify to the semifinals.

Rank	Heat	Lane	Name	Nationality	Time	Notes
1	5	4	Barbora Seemanova	Czech Republic	54.04	Q
2	5	3	Barbora Janickova	Czech Republic	54.55	Q
3	5	5	Nikolett Pádár	Hungary	54.85	Q
4	3	5	Kalia Antoniou	Cyprus	54.88	Q
5	3	4	Kornelia Fiedkiewicz	Poland	55.00	Q
6	4	6	Nina Jazy	Germany	55.04	Q
7	5	2	Minna Ábrahám	Hungary	55.04	Q
8	4	5	Petra Senánszky	Hungary	55.05	
9	5	6	Panna Ugrai	Hungary	55.14	
10	4	2	Andrea Murez	Israel	55.28	Q
11	3	2	Lena Kreundl	Austria	55.41	Q
12	4	3	Elisabeth Sabroe Ebbesen	Denmark	55.43	Q
13	4	4	Signe Bro	Denmark	55.52	Q
14	3	1	Aleksa Gold	Estonia	55.58	Q, NR
15	4	1	Iris Julia Berger	Austria	55.61	Q
16	3	3	Zuzanna Famulok	Poland	55.65	Q
17	5	7	Teresa Ivan	Slovakia	55.83	Q
18	3	6	Daria Golovati	Israel	55.87	Q
19	5	1	Katarina Milutinović	Serbia	55.98	
20	4	7	Julia Maik	Poland	56.18	
21	5	8	Hanna Bergman	Sweden	56.31	
22	4	8	Elvira Mörtstrand	Sweden	56.42	
23	2	3	Diana Petkova	Bulgaria	56.52	
24	3	8	Cornelia Pammer	Austria	56.56	
25	5	0	Fanny Teijonsalo	Finland	56.63	
26	3	7	Aleksandra Polańska	Poland	56.69	
27	2	4	Tjaša Pintar	Slovenia	56.88	
28	3	0	Marijana Jelic	Austria	56.98	
29	4	9	Jóhanna Elín Guðmundsdóttir	Iceland	57.13	
30	4	0	Anna Hadjiloizou	Cyprus	57.14	
31	5	9	Mina Kaljevic	Serbia	57.74	
32	3	9	Jana Marković	Serbia	58.07	
33	2	5	Hana Sekuti	Slovenia	58.09	
34	2	7	Iman Avdić	Bosnia and Herzegovina	58.14	
35	2	2	Mia Blaževska Eminova	North Macedonia	58.29	
36	2	6	Aliisa Soini	Finland	58.34	
37	2	1	Ani Poghosyan	Armenia	58.48	NR
38	1	4	Fatima Alkaramova	Azerbaijan	58.70	
39	2	8	Mariam Sheikhalizadeh	Azerbaijan	58.74	
40	2	0	Ilaria Ceccaroni	San Marino	59.54	
41	1	5	Jovana Kuljaca	Montenegro	1:00.69	
42	1	3	Arla Dyrmishi	Albania	1:02.96	

=== Semifinals ===
The semifinals were started on 17 June at 18:37.
Qualification Rules: The first 2 competitors of each semifinal and the remaining fastest (up to a total of 8 qualified competitors) from the semifinals advance to the final.

Rank	Heat	Lane	Name	Nationality	Time	Notes
1	2	4	Barbora Seemanova	Czech Republic	53.95	Q
2	2	5	Nikolett Pádár	Hungary	54.17	Q
3	1	4	Barbora Janickova	Czech Republic	54.32	Q
4	1	5	Kalia Antoniou	Cyprus	54.39	Q
5	2	3	Kornelia Fiedkiewicz	Poland	54.50	Q
6	2	2	Lena Kreundl	Austria	54.81	Q,NR
7	1	6	Andrea Murez	Israel	54.90	Q
7	2	6	Minna Ábrahám	Hungary	54.90	Q
9	2	7	Signe Bro	Denmark	55.08	
10	1	7	Aleksa Gold	Estonia	55.18	NR
10	2	8	Teresa Ivan	Slovakia	55.18	
12	1	3	Nina Jazy	Germany	55.37	
13	1	1	Zuzanna Famulok	Poland	55.41	
14	1	8	Daria Golovati	Israel	55.51	
14	1	2	Elisabeth Sabroe Ebbesen	Denmark	55.53	
16	2	1	Iris Julia Berger	Austria	55.78	

=== Final ===
The final was held on 18 June at 18:42.

Rank	Lane	Name	Nationality	Time	Notes
1st place, gold medalist(s)	4	Barbora Seemanova	Czech Republic	53.50	NR
2nd place, silver medalist(s)	3	Barbora Janickova	Czech Republic	54.17	
3rd place, bronze medalist(s)	5	Nikolett Pádár	Hungary	54.22	
4	6	Kalia Antoniou	Cyprus	54.23	NR
5	2	Kornelia Fiedkiewicz	Poland	54.79	
6	1	Andrea Murez	Israel	54.91	
7	7	Lena Kreundl	Austria	55.07	
8	8	Minna Ábrahám	Hungary	55.11	
