= 2024 World Aquatics Swimming Championships (25 m) – Women's 4 × 100 metre freestyle relay =

Swimming competition

Women's 4 × 100 metre freestyle relay at the 2024 World Aquatics Swimming Championships (25 m)
- Venue: Duna Arena
- Location: Budapest, Hungary
- Dates: 10 December (heats and final)
- Competitors: 60 from 13 nations
- Teams: 13
- Winning time: 3:25.01 WR

Medalists
| gold medal | Kate Douglass; Katharine Berkoff; Alex Shackell; Gretchen Walsh; Phoebe Bacon; Jillian Cox | United States |
| silver medal | Meg Harris; Milla Jansen; Alexandria Perkins; Lani Pallister; Lily Price; Leah Neale | Australia |
| bronze medal | Mary-Sophie Harvey; Summer McIntosh; Ingrid Wilm; Penny Oleksiak; Sydney Pickrem; Alexanne Lepage | Canada |

The women's 4 × 100 metre freestyle relay event at the 2024 World Aquatics Swimming Championships (25 m) was held on 10 December 2024 at the Duna Arena in Budapest, Hungary.

== Records ==
Prior to the competition, the existing world and championship records were as follows.

| World record | Australia (AUS) | 3:25.43 | Melbourne, Australia | 13 December 2022 |
| Competition record | Australia (AUS) | 3:25.43 | Melbourne, Australia | 13 December 2022 |

The following new records were set during this competition:

| Date | Event | Name | Nation | Time | Record |
|---|---|---|---|---|---|
| 10 December | Final | Kate Douglass (50.95); Katharine Berkoff (51.38); Alex Shackell (52.01); Gretchen Walsh (50.67) | United States | 3:25.01 | WR |

== Results ==
=== Heats ===
The heats were started at 11:23.

| Rank | Heat | Lane | Nation | Swimmers | Time | Notes |
|---|---|---|---|---|---|---|
| 1 | 1 | 3 | Italy | Sofia Morini (52.71); Sara Curtis (51.30); Chiara Tarantino (52.58); Emma Virginia Menicucci (53.27) | 3:29.86 | Q |
| 2 | 1 | 2 | Germany | Nina Jazy (52.93); Nicole Maier (53.19); Nina Holt (52.07); Nele Schulze (52.18) | 3:30.37 | Q, NR |
| 3 | 1 | 4 | United States | Phoebe Bacon (53.39); Alex Shackell (52.16); Jillian Cox (55.10); Gretchen Walsh (50.51) | 3:31.16 | Q |
| 4 | 2 | 6 | Hungary | Nikolett Pádár (53.22); Panna Ugrai (52.93); Petra Senánszky (52.63); Lilla Minna Ábrahám (52.58) | 3:31.36 | Q, NR |
| 5 | 2 | 3 | Sweden | Sara Junevik (52.68); Louise Hansson (51.88); Klara Thormalm (53.98); Sofia Åstedt (53.02) | 3:31.56 | Q |
| 6 | 2 | 1 | Neutral Athletes B | Daria Klepikova (52.60); Daria Trofimova (51.84); Alina Gaifutdinova (53.98); Milana Stepanova (53.47) | 3:31.89 | Q |
| 7 | 2 | 4 | Australia | Milla Jansen (53.08); Lily Price (53.95); Leah Neale (52.65); Meg Harris (52.22) | 3:31.90 | Q |
| 8 | 1 | 5 | Canada | Penny Oleksiak (53.72); Sydney Pickrem (53.52); Ingrid Wilm (52.97); Alexanne Lepage (54.29) | 3:34.50 | Q |
| 9 | 2 | 5 | China | Liu Shuhan (53.41); Kong Yaqi (54.45); Zhang Jingyan (54.28); Luo Mingyu (54.04) | 3:36.18 | R |
| 10 | 1 | 6 | Japan | Yume Jinno (53.94); Mizuki Hirai (53.46); Aimi Nagaoka (53.94); Misuzu Nagaoka (55.04) | 3:36.38 | R |
| 11 | 1 | 7 | Slovakia | Teresa Ivan (54.33); Zora Ripková (55.07); Alexandra Hrnčárová (54.57); Lillian Slušná (54.28) | 3:38.25 | NR |
| 12 | 2 | 2 | Hong Kong | Tam Hoi Lam (54.08); Gilaine Ma (54.97); Ng Lai Wa (57.06); Li Sum Yiu (53.56) | 3:39.67 | NR |
| 13 | 2 | 7 | South Africa | Caitlin de Lange (54.01); Hannah Robertson (56.07); Milla Drakopoulos (56.74); Jessica Thompson (55.57) | 3:42.39 | |

=== Final ===
The final was held at 19:12.

| Rank | Lane | Nation | Swimmers | Time | Notes |
|---|---|---|---|---|---|
| 1st place, gold medalist(s) | 3 | United States | Kate Douglass (50.95); Katharine Berkoff (51.38); Alex Shackell (52.01); Gretchen Walsh (50.67) | 3:25.01 | WR |
| 2nd place, silver medalist(s) | 1 | Australia | Meg Harris (52.59); Milla Jansen (51.62); Alexandria Perkins (51.68); Lani Pallister (52.36) | 3:28.25 | |
| 3rd place, bronze medalist(s) | 8 | Canada | Mary-Sophie Harvey (52.4); Summer McIntosh (51.81); Ingrid Wilm (52.22); Penny Oleksiak (52.01) | 3:28.44 | |
| 4 | 7 | Neutral Athletes B | Daria Klepikova (51.96); Daria Trofimova (51.36); Milana Stepanova (53.27); Arina Surkova (52.14) | 3:28.73 | NR |
| 5 | 4 | Italy | Sofia Morini (52.55); Sara Curtis (51.69); Chiara Tarantino (52.63); Emma Virginia Menicucci (52.71) | 3:29.58 | |
| 6 | 2 | Sweden | Sara Junevik (52.5); Louise Hansson (51.67); Hanna Bergman (53.35); Sofia Åstedt (52.29) | 3:29.81 | |
| 7 | 6 | Hungary | Nikolett Pádár (52.69); Panna Ugrai (52.93); Petra Senánszky (52.58); Lilla Minna Ábrahám (51.9) | 3:30.10 | NR |
| 8 | 5 | Germany | Nina Jazy (53.22); Nicole Maier (52.68); Nina Holt (52.21); Nele Schulze (52.66) | 3:30.77 | |
