= Swimming at the 2022 European Aquatics Championships – Mixed 4 × 100 metre freestyle relay =

Mixed 4 × 100 metre freestyle relay at the 2022 European Aquatics Championships
- Venue: Foro Italico
- Dates: 15 August
- Competitors: 61 from 10 nations
- Teams: 10
- Winning time: 3:22.80

Medalists
gold medal	Maxime Grousset; Charles Rihoux; Charlotte Bonnet; Marie Wattel; Hadrien Salvan; Lucile Tessariol; Béryl Gastaldello	France
silver medal	Thomas Dean; Matthew Richards; Anna Hopkin; Freya Anderson; Edward Mildred; Jacob Whittle; Lucy Hope	Great Britain
bronze medal	Björn Seeliger; Robin Hanson; Sarah Sjöström; Louise Hansson; Sofia Åstedt	Sweden

The Mixed 4 × 100 metre freestyle relay competition of the 2022 European Aquatics Championships was held on 15 August 2022.

== Records ==
Prior to the competition, the existing world, European and championship records were as follows.

	Team	Time	Location	Date
World record	Australia	3:19.38	Budapest	24 June 2022
European record	Netherlands	3:21.81	Budapest	29 July 2017
Championship record	France	3:22.07	Glasgow	8 August 2018
Championship record	Great Britain	3:22.07	Budapest	22 May 2021

== Results ==
=== Heats ===
The heats were started at 10:03.

Rank	Heat	Lane	Nation	Swimmers	Time	Notes
1	1	7	France	Hadrien Salvan (48.89); Charles Rihoux (48.19); Lucile Tessariol (55.15); Béryl Gastaldello (53.96)	3:26.19	Q
2	1	3	Great Britain	Edward Mildred (49.43); Jacob Whittle (47.95); Lucy Hope (54.87); Freya Anderson (54.54)	3:26.79	Q
3	1	2	Italy	Alessandro Bori (48.85); Manuel Frigo (48.20); Sofia Morini (54.66); Costanza Cocconcelli (55.32)	3:27.03	Q
4	2	5	Hungary	Szebasztián Szabó (48.66); Dániel Mészáros (49.25); Lilla Minna Ábrahám (55.54); Fanni Gyurinovics (54.89)	3:28.34	Q
5	2	7	Netherlands	Stan Pijnenburg (48.88); Sean Niewold (49.48); Sam van Nunen (55.14); Imani de Jong (54.88)	3:28.38	Q
6	2	4	Sweden	Björn Seeliger (48.07); Robin Hanson (49.56); Sofia Åstedt (56.48); Sarah Sjöström (54.28)	3:28.39	Q
7	2	3	Spain	Carles Coll (49.02); Sergio de Celis (48.12); Ainho Campabadal (56.81); Lidón Muñoz (54.92)	3:28.87	Q
8	2	2	Poland	Mateusz Chowaniec (49.46); Konrad Czerniak (49.62); Anna Dowgiert (55.34); Aleksandra Polańska (54.74)	3:29.16	Q
9	1	6	Armenia	Artur Barseghyan (50.32); Vladimir Mamikonyan (54.15); Ani Poghosyan (58.23); Varsenik Manucharyan (59.83)	3:42.53	
10	1	4	Albania	Zhulian Lavdaniti (52.95); Franc Aleksi (56.30); Nikol Merizaj (58.79); Sara Dande (1:05.93)	3:53.97	
	1	5	Luxembourg		Did not start	
	2	6	Israel		Did not start	

=== Final ===
The final was held at 19:49.

Rank	Lane	Nation	Swimmers	Time	Notes
1st place, gold medalist(s)	4	France	Maxime Grousset (48.02); Charles Rihoux (48.39); Charlotte Bonnet (53.34); Marie Wattel (53.05)	3:22.80	
2nd place, silver medalist(s)	5	Great Britain	Thomas Dean (48.46); Matthew Richards (48.19); Anna Hopkin (53.62); Freya Anderson (53.03)	3:23.30	
3rd place, bronze medalist(s)	7	Sweden	Björn Seeliger (48.09); Robin Hanson (48.91); Sarah Sjöström (52.68); Louise Hansson (53.72)	3:23.40	NR
4	3	Italy	Lorenzo Zazzeri (48.38); Alessandro Miressi (47.38); Silvia Di Pietro (53.92); Chiara Tarantino (53.94)	3:23.62	
5	8	Poland	Karol Ostrowski (48.61); Kamil Sieradzki (48.64); Anna Dowgiert (54.78); Aleksandra Polańska (53.70)	3:25.73	
6	2	Netherlands	Stan Pijnenburg (49.19); Nyls Korstanje (49.12); Tessa Giele (54.87); Marrit Steenbergen (52.90)	3:26.08	
7	6	Hungary	Nándor Németh (48.28); Szebasztián Szabó (48.40); Nikolett Pádár (54.98); Dóra Molnár (54.88)	3:26.54	
8	1	Spain	Luis Domínguez (49.25); Sergio de Celis (48.27); Lidón Muñoz (55.28); Carmen Weiler (54.72)	3:27.52	NR
