= Swimming at the 2024 European Aquatics Championships – Women's 4 × 100 metre medley relay =

Women's 4 × 100 metre medley relay at the 2024 European Aquatics Championships
- Venue: Sports Centre Milan Gale Muškatirović
- Dates: 23 June (heats and final)
- Competitors: 52 from 11 nations
- Teams: 11
- Winning time: 3:58.71

Medalists
gold medal	Adela Piskorska; Dominika Sztandera; Paulina Peda; Kornelia Fiedkiewicz; Laura Bernat; Wiktoria Piotrowska; Zuzanna Famulok	Poland
silver medal	Lora Komoróczy; Eszter Békési; Panna Ugrai; Nikolett Pádár; Minna Ábrahám	Hungary
bronze medal	Schastine Tabor; Clara Rybak-Andersen; Helena Rosendahl Bach; Julie Kepp Jensen; Elisabeth Ebbesen	Denmark

The Women's 4 × 100 metre medley relay competition of the 2024 European Aquatics Championships was held on 23 June 2024.

== Records ==
Prior to the competition, the existing European and championship records were as follows.

	Team	Time	Location	Date
World record	United States	3:50.40	Gwangju	28 July 2019
European record	Russia	3:53.38	Budapest	30 July 2017
Championship record	Great Britain	3:54.01	Budapest	23 May 2021

== Results ==
=== Heats ===
The heats were started at 10:10.
Qualification Rules: The 8 fastest from the heats qualify to the final.

Rank	Heat	Lane	Nation	Swimmers	Time	Notes
1	2	3	Hungary	Lora Komoróczy (1:01.41); Eszter Békési (1:08.69); Panna Ugrai (58.89); Minna Ábrahám (55.31)	4:04.30	Q
2	1	3	Poland	Laura Bernat (1:02.99); Dominika Sztandera (1:07.91); Wiktoria Piotrowska (58.70); Zuzanna Famulok (54.84)	4:04.44	Q
3	1	2	Greece	Theodora Drakou (1:02.07); Chara Angelaki (1:09.77); Georgia Damasioti (59.36); Maria-Thaleia Drasidou (55.01)	4:06.21	Q
4	2	2	Denmark	Schastine Tabor (1:02.27); Clara Rybak-Andersen (1:08.51); Elisabeth Ebbesen (1:00.32); Julie Kepp Jensen (55.21)	4:06.31	Q
5	2	7	Sweden	Hanna Rosvall (1:01.46); Olivia Klint Ipsa (1:08.12); Edith Jernstedt (1:00.39); Hanna Bergman (56.55)	4:06.52	Q
6	2	6	Israel	Ayla Spitz (1:01.21); Lea Polonsky (1:11.27); Ariel Hayon (59.64); Andrea Murez (54.51)	4:06.63	Q
7	1	4	Slovenia	Janja Šegel (1:02.98); Tina Čelik (1:07.95); Hana Sekuti (1:01.85); Tjaša Pintar (56.44)	4:09.22	Q
8	1	5	Slovakia	Tamara Potocká (1:03.03); Andrea Podmaníková (1:10.45); Zora Ripková (1:00.65); Teresa Ivan (56.16)	4:10.29	Q
9	1	6	Serbia	Katarina Milutinović (1:02.81); Martina Bukvić (1:09.63); Mina Kaljević (1:02.21); Jana Marković (56.64)	4:11.29	
10	1	7	Armenia	Diana Musayelyan (1:07.25); Varsenik Manucharyan (1:15.98); Yeva Karapetyan (1:05.72); Ani Poghosyan (58.17)	4:27.12	
	2	4	Finland	Fanny Teijonsalo (1:01.58); Kiia Metsäkonkola; Ada Hakkarainen; Leonie-Sarah Tenzer	DSQ	
	2	5	Great Britain	Did not start		

=== Final ===
The final was held at 19:46.

Rank	Lane	Nation	Swimmers	Time	Notes
1st place, gold medalist(s)	5	Poland	Adela Piskorska (1:00.40); Dominika Sztandera (1:06.07); Paulina Peda (58.15); Kornelia Fiedkiewicz (54.09)	3:58.71	NR
2nd place, silver medalist(s)	4	Hungary	Lora Komoróczy (1:01.08); Eszter Békési (1:08.49); Panna Ugrai (57.91); Nikolett Pádár (54.02)	4:01.50	
3rd place, bronze medalist(s)	6	Denmark	Schastine Tabor (1:01.97); Clara Rybak-Andersen (1:08.04); Helena Rosendahl Bach (57.82); Julie Kepp Jensen (54.20)	4:02.03	
4	2	Sweden	Hanna Rosvall (1:01.24); Olivia Klint Ipsa (1:08.10); Sara Junevik (57.39); Elvira Mörtstrand (55.54)	4:02.27	
5	7	Greece	Theodora Drakou (1:02.18); Chara Angelaki (1:09.29); Georgia Damasioti (58.23); Maria-Thaleia Drasidou (55.35)	4:05.05	
6	1	Israel	Ayla Spitz (1:01.44); Daria Golovaty (1:13.81); Ariel Hayon (58.54); Andrea Murez (54.68)	4:08.47	
7	8	Slovenia	Janja Šegel (1:03.20); Tina Čelik (1:07.88); Hana Sekuti (1:01.55); Tjaša Pintar (56.22)	4:08.85	
8	8	Slovakia	Tamara Potocká (1:03.29); Andrea Podmaníková (1:09.31); Zora Ripková (1:01.18); Teresa Ivan (55.56)	4:09.34	
