= Swimming at the 2024 European Aquatics Championships – Women's 4 × 100 metre freestyle relay =

Women's 4 × 100 metre freestyle relay at the 2024 European Aquatics Championships
- Venue: Sports Centre Milan Gale Muškatirović
- Dates: 19 June (heats and final)
- Competitors: 44 from 10 nations
- Teams: 10
- Winning time: 3:36.77

Medalists
gold medal	Petra Senánszky; Minna Ábrahám; Panna Ugrai; Nikolett Pádár	Hungary
silver medal	Elisabeth Sabroe Ebbesen; Signe Bro; Julie Kepp Jensen; Schastine Tabor	Denmark
bronze medal	Kornelia Fiedkiewicz; Zuzanna Famulok; Wiktoria Guść; Aleksandra Polańska	Poland

The Women's 4 × 100 metre freestyle relay competition of the 2024 European Aquatics Championships was held on 19 June 2024.

== Records ==
Before the competition, the existing world, European and championship records were as follows.

	Team	Time	Location	Date
World record	Australia	3:27.96	Fukuoka	23 July 2023
European record	Netherlands	3:31.72	Rome	26 July 2009
Championship record	Netherlands	3:33.62	Eindhoven	18 March 2008

== Results ==
=== Heats ===
The heats were started on 19 June at 10:36.
Qualification Rules: The 8 fastest from the heats qualify to the final.

Rank	Heat	Lane	Nation	Swimmers	Time	Notes
1	1	6	Hungary	Panna Ugrai (54.94); Zsuzsanna Jakabos (57.53); Petra Senánszky (54.48); Dóra Molnár (55.09)	3:42.04	Q
2	1	2	Denmark	Elisabeth Sabroe Ebbesen (55.15); Schastine Tabor (56.09); Karoline Sørensen (57.03); Julie Kepp Jensen (54.81)	3:43.08	Q
3	1	3	Austria	Lena Kreundl (55.36); Iris Julia Berger (55.28); Marijana Jelic (56.29); Cornelia Pammer (56.40)	3:43.33	Q, NR
4	1	5	Sweden	Hanna Bergman (56.81); Sara Junevik (54.28); Elvira Mörtstrand (56.24); Klara Thormalm (56.34)	3:43.67	Q
5	2	2	Israel	Lea Polonsky (55.85); Ayla Riley Spitz (56.07); Daria Golovati (56.87); Andrea Murez (54.97)	3:43.76	Q
6	2	4	Poland	Zuzanna Famulok (57.24); Julia Maik (56.18); Wiktoria Guść (55.68); Aleksandra Polańska (55.37)	3:44.47	Q
7	2	3	Slovenia	Janja Šegel (55.39); Katja Fain (56.07); Tjaša Pintar (56.50); Hana Sekuti (57.60)	3:45.56	Q
8	2	7	Serbia	Katarina Milutinović (55.66); Mina Kaljević (56.86); Jana Marković (56.92); Martina Bukvić (56.80)	3:46.24	Q
9	2	5	Slovakia	Lillian Slušná (56.41); Teresa Ivan (56.30); Laura Benková (57.77); Zora Ripková (57.33)	3:47.81	
10	2	6	Armenia	Ani Poghosyan (58.25); Diana Musayelyan (1:00.81); Varsenik Manucharyan (59.18); Yeva Karapetyan (1:02.95)	4:01.19	
	1	4	Finland	DNS		

=== Final ===
The final was held at 20:20.

Rank	Lane	Nation	Swimmers	Time	Notes
1st place, gold medalist(s)	4	Hungary	Petra Senánszky (54.79); Minna Ábrahám (54.43); Panna Ugrai (53.88); Nikolett Pádár (53.67)	3:36.77	NR
2nd place, silver medalist(s)	5	Denmark	Elisabeth Sabroe Ebbesen (54.75); Signe Bro (54.72); Julie Kepp Jensen (54.12); Schastine Tabor (54.89)	3:38.48	
3rd place, bronze medalist(s)	7	Poland	Kornelia Fiedkiewicz (55.06); Zuzanna Famulok (55.70); Wiktoria Guść (55.31); Aleksandra Polańska (54.94)	3:41.01	
4	2	Israel	Lea Polonsky (56.40); Ayla Riley Spitz (55.89); Daria Golovati (54.71); Andrea Murez (54.13)	3:41.13	NR
5	3	Austria	Iris Julia Berger (55.53); Cornelia Pammer (56.33); Marijana Jelic (55.66); Lena Kreundl (54.47)	3:41.99	NR
6	6	Sweden	Klara Thormalm (57.03); Sara Junevik (54.45); Hanna Bergman (55.96); Elvira Mörtstrand (55.42)	3:42.86	
7	1	Slovenia	Janja Šegel (55.08); Katja Fain (55.51); Hana Sekuti (57.50); Tjaša Pintar (56.21)	3:44.30	
8	8	Serbia	Katarina Milutinović (55.96); Mina Kaljević (56.21); Jana Marković (56.19); Martina Bukvić (57.28)	3:45.64	
