= Swimming at the 2026 European Aquatics Championships – Women's 4 × 100 metre freestyle relay =

Women's 4 × 100 metre freestyle relay at the 2026 European Aquatics Championships
- Venue: Paris Aquatic Centre
- Dates: 12 August
- Competitors: 54 from 11 nations
- Teams: 11
- Winning time: 3:31.89 CR

Medalists
| gold medal | Milou van Wijk; Imani de Jong; Yara van Kalmthout; Marrit Steenbergen; Tessa Giele; Femke Spiering | Netherlands |
| silver medal | Emma Virginia Menicucci; Sara Curtis; Chiara Tarantino; Alessandra Mao; Sofia Morini | Italy |
| bronze medal | Daria Klepikova; Alexandra Kuznetsova; Alina Gaifutdinova; Kira Manokhina; Dariia Surushkina; Kseniia Sorokina |

The Women's 4 × 100 metre freestyle relay competition of the 2026 European Aquatics Championships was held on 12 August 2026.

== Records ==
Before the competition, the existing world, European and championship records were as follows.

| | Team | Time | Location | Date |
|---|---|---|---|---|
| World record | Australia | 3:27.96 | Fukuoka | 23 July 2023 |
| European record | Netherlands | 3:31.72 | Rome | 26 July 2009 |
| Championship record | Netherlands | 3:33.62 | Eindhoven | 18 March 2008 |

== Results ==
=== Heats ===
The heats were held at 11:03.

| Rank | Heat | Time | Nation | Swimmers | Time | Notes |
|---|---|---|---|---|---|---|
| 1 | 1 | 3 | Neutral Athletes B | Kira Manokhina (54.06); Dariia Surushkina (54.09); Kseniia Sorokina (54.24); Alexandra Kuznetsova (54.22) | 3:36.61 | Q |
| 2 | 1 | 4 | Netherlands | Yara van Kalmthout (54.39); Tessa Giele (54.51); Femke Spiering (55.07); Milou van Wijk (52.87) | 3:36.84 | Q |
| 3 | 2 | 2 | France | Albane Cachot (54.17); Marie Wattel (54.33); Giulia Rossi-Bene (54.49); Béryl Gastaldello (54.06) | 3:37.05 | Q |
| 4 | 1 | 6 | Hungary | Nikolett Pádár (55.22); Lilla Minna Ábrahám (53.87); Petra Senánszky (54.16); Panna Ugrai (54.06) | 3:37.31 | Q |
| 5 | 2 | 3 | Spain | Irene Ciércoles (54.06); Ainhoa Campabadal (54.69); María Daza (53.71); Naiara Sobreviela (55.79) | 3:38.25 | Q, NR |
| 6 | 1 | 5 | Great Britain | Theodora Taylor (54.08); Freya Anderson (54.64); Leah Schlosshan (54.58); Abbie Wood (55.09) | 3:38.39 | Q |
| 7 | 2 | 6 | Italy | Emma Virginia Menicucci (54.40); Chiara Tarantino (54.66); Alessandra Mao (54.43); Sofia Morini (55.21) | 3:38.70 | Q |
| 8 | 2 | 5 | Germany | Nina Holt (55.12); Nina Jazy (54.97); Julianna Bocska (53.96); Maya Tobehn (54.75) | 3:38.80 | Q |
| 9 | 2 | 7 | Sweden | Sofia Åstedt (54.54); Louise Hansson (54.47); Sara Junevik (54.44); Elvira Mörtstrand (55.49) | 3:38.94 | |
| 10 | 1 | 2 | Lithuania | Sylvia Statkevičius (55.74); Barbora Mileišytė (55.53); Ieva Nainytė (56.09); Ieva Visockaitė (56.39) | 3:43.75 | |
| 11 | 2 | 4 | Switzerland | Angelina Patt (56.58); Gaia Rasmussen (56.24); Manon Richard (56.12); Julia Ullmann (55.45) | 3:44.39 | |
| | 1 | 7 | Poland | | Did not start | |

=== Final ===
The final was held at 20:16.

| Rank | Lane | Nation | Swimmers | Time | Notes |
|---|---|---|---|---|---|
| 1st place, gold medalist(s) | 5 | Netherlands | Milou van Wijk (53.40); Imani de Jong (53.47); Yara van Kalmthout (53.68); Marrit Steenbergen (51.34) | 3:31.89 | CR |
| 2nd place, silver medalist(s) | 1 | Italy | Emma Virginia Menicucci (53.85); Sara Curtis (52.29); Chiara Tarantino (53.68); Alessandra Mao (53.37) | 3:33.19 | NR |
| 3rd place, bronze medalist(s) | 4 | Neutral Athletes B | Daria Klepikova (53.22); Alexandra Kuznetsova (53.85); Alina Gaifutdinova (53.54); Kira Manokhina (53.08) | 3:33.69 | NR |
| 4 | 3 | France | Marie Wattel (53.69); Béryl Gastaldello (53.42); Albane Cachot (53.27); Mary-Ambre Moluh (53.53) | 3:33.91 | |
| 5 | 7 | Great Britain | Evelyn Davis (54.06); Theodora Taylor (53.61); Freya Colbert (53.20); Freya Anderson (53.60) | 3:34.47 | |
| 6 | 6 | Hungary | Panna Ugrai (54.46); Lilla Minna Ábrahám (53.79); Petra Senánszky (53.76); Nikolett Pádár (53.46) | 3:35.47 | |
| 7 | 8 | Germany | Nina Holt (54.76); Linda Roth (53.99); Julianna Bocska (54.45); Nicole Maier (53.70) | 3:36.90 | |
| 8 | 2 | Spain | María Daza (54.10); Irene Ciércoles (53.46); Ainhoa Campabadal (54.67); Naiara Sobreviela (55.96) | 3:38.19 | NR |
