= 2024 World Aquatics Swimming Championships (25 m) – Women's 4 × 100 metre medley relay =

Swimming competition

Women's 4 × 100 metre medley relay at the 2024 World Aquatics Swimming Championships (25 m)
- Venue: Duna Arena
- Location: Budapest, Hungary
- Dates: 15 December (heats and final)
- Competitors: 80 from 18 nations
- Teams: 18
- Winning time: 3:40.41 WR

Medalists
gold medal	Regan Smith; Lilly King; Gretchen Walsh; Kate Douglass; Katharine Berkoff; Emma Weber; Alex Shackell; Alex Walsh	United States
silver medal	Abbie Wood; Angharad Evans; Eva Okaro; Freya Anderson	Great Britain
bronze medal	Qian Xinan; Tang Qianting; Chen Luying; Liu Shuhan	China

The women's 4 × 100 metre medley relay event at the 2024 World Aquatics Swimming Championships (25 m) was held on 15 December 2024 at the Duna Arena in Budapest, Hungary.

== Records ==
Prior to the competition, the existing world and championship records were as follows.

World record	United States (USA)	3:44.35	Melbourne, Australia	18 December 2022
Competition record	United States (USA)	3:44.35	Melbourne, Australia	18 December 2022

The following record was established during the competition:

Date	Event	Nationality	Time	Record
15 December	Final	United States (USA)	3:40.41	WR

== Results ==
=== Heats ===
The heats were started at 10:24.

Rank	Heat	Lane	Nation	Swimmers	Time	Notes
1	3	4	United States	Katharine Berkoff (55.34); Emma Weber (1:05.30); Alex Shackell (55.81); Alex Walsh (52.11)	3:48.56	Q
2	3	5	China	Qian Xinan (56.69); Tang Qianting (1:03.11); Chen Luying (56.42); Liu Shuhan (52.88)	3:49.10	Q
3	2	3	Sweden	Hanna Rosvall (57.74); Olivia Klint Ipsa (1:04.80); Louise Hansson (55.19); Sara Junevik (52.06)	3:49.79	Q
4	2	6	Great Britain	Abbie Wood (57.62); Angharad Evans (1:03.80); Eva Okaro (57.10); Freya Anderson (51.68)	3:50.20	Q, NR
5	3	7	Italy	Sara Curtis (57.46); Benedetta Pilato (1:04.23); Elena Capretta (56.65); Sofia Morini (52.46)	3:50.80	Q, NR
6	1	3	Neutral Athletes B	Elizaveta Agapitova (57.77); Yuliya Efimova (1:04.65); Arina Surkova (56.86); Daria Trofimova (52.53)	3:51.81	Q
7	2	7	Hungary	Lora Komoróczy (57.30); Henrietta Fángli (1:04.65); Panna Ugrai (57.06); Petra Senánszky (52.91)	3:51.92	Q, NR
8	3	3	Japan	Aimi Nagaoka (58.57); Kotomi Kato (1:04.65); Mizuki Hirai (55.55); Yume Jinno (53.48)	3:52.25	Q
9	3	6	Netherlands	Kira Toussaint (57.33); Tessa Giele (1:05.82); Maaike de Waard (56.80); Milou van Wijk (53.07)	3:53.02	R
10	2	4	Australia	Iona Anderson (57.65); Tara Kinder (1:07.08); Lily Price (55.83); Milla Jansen (53.26)	3:53.82	R
11	3	2	Poland	Adela Piskorska (57.30); Dominika Sztandera (1:05.69); Paulina Peda (57.98); Kornelia Fiedkiewicz (53.30)	3:54.27	
12	1	4	New Zealand	Helena Gasson (57.04) NR; Brearna Crawford (1:07.13); Hazel Ouwehand (59.27); Zoe Pedersen (53.58)	3:57.02	NR
13	2	8	Slovakia	Teresa Ivan (59.79); Andrea Podmaníková (1:06.31); Tamara Potocká (56.72); Lillian Slušná (54.36)	3:57.18	NR
14	2	1	South Africa	Milla Drakopoulos (59.32); Lara van Niekerk (1:06.13); Rebecca Meder (57.20); Jessica Thompson (55.03)	3:57.68	AF
15	2	2	South Korea	Kim Seung-won (59.28); Park Si-eun (1:06.21); Jeong So-eun (1:01.18); Hur Yeon-kyung (54.89)	4:01.56	
16	3	1	Hong Kong	Cindy Cheung (1:02.13); Man Wui Kiu (1:07.76); Yeung Hoi Ching (58.49); Li Sum Yiu (54.60)	4:02.98	
17	1	5	Thailand	Saovanee Boonamphai (1:03.24); Phiangkhwan Pawapotako (1:08.87); Jinjutha Pholjamjumrus (1:01.31); Jenjira Srisaard (55.35)	4:08.77	
	2	5	Canada	Kylie Masse (56.34); Alexanne Lepage (1:05.15); Ingrid Wilm (58.16); Penny Oleksiak	Disqualified	
	3	8	Spain	Carmen Weiler; Emma Carrasco; Laura Cabanes; María Daza	Did not start	

=== Final ===
The final was held at 18:54.

Rank	Lane	Nation	Swimmers	Time	Notes
1st place, gold medalist(s)	4	United States	Regan Smith (54.02) WR; Lilly King (1:03.02); Gretchen Walsh (52.84); Kate Douglass (50.53)	3:40.41	WR
2nd place, silver medalist(s)	6	Great Britain	Abbie Wood (57.44); Angharad Evans (1:03.18); Eva Okaro (56.11); Freya Anderson (51.11)	3:47.84	NR
3rd place, bronze medalist(s)	5	China	Qian Xinan (56.88); Tang Qianting (1:03.17); Chen Luying (56.25); Liu Shuhan (51.63)	3:47.93	
4	3	Sweden	Hanna Rosvall (57.79); Sophie Hansson (1:04.54); Louise Hansson (54.67); Sara Junevik (51.35)	3:48.35	
5	7	Neutral Athletes B	Elizaveta Agapitova (58.16); Evgeniia Chikunova (1:03.26); Arina Surkova (56.48); Daria Klepikova (51.45)	3:49.35	NR
6	2	Italy	Sara Curtis (57.41); Benedetta Pilato (1:04.30); Elena Capretta (57.01); Sofia Morini (51.64)	3:50.36	NR
7	8	Japan	Aimi Nagaoka (58.52); Kotomi Kato (1:04.29); Mizuki Hirai (55.44); Yume Jinno (52.88)	3:51.13	
8	1	Hungary	Lora Komoróczy (57.58); Henrietta Fángli (1:04.91); Panna Ugrai (56.75); Lilla Minna Ábrahám (52.41)	3:51.65	NR
