= Swimming at the 2022 European Aquatics Championships – Women's 100 metre freestyle =

Women's 100 metre freestyle at the 2022 European Aquatics Championships
- Venue: Foro Italico
- Dates: 11 August (heats and semifinals); 12 August (final)
- Competitors: 36 from 24 nations
- Winning time: 53.24

Medalists
gold medal	Marrit Steenbergen	Netherlands
silver medal	Charlotte Bonnet	France
bronze medal	Freya Anderson	Great Britain

The Women's 100 metre freestyle competition of the 2022 European Aquatics Championships was held on 11 and 12 August 2022.

== Records ==
Prior to the competition, the existing world, European and championship records were as follows.

	Name	Nationality	Time	Location	Date
World record European record	Sarah Sjöström	Sweden	51.71	Budapest	23 July 2017
Championship record	Sarah Sjöström	Sweden	52.67	Berlin	20 August 2014

== Results ==
=== Heats ===
The heats were started on 11 August at 09:15.

Rank	Heat	Lane	Name	Nationality	Time	Notes
1	2	4	Charlotte Bonnet	France	53.92	Q
2	4	4	Marrit Steenbergen	Netherlands	54.22	Q
3	2	5	Janja Šegel	Slovenia	54.40	Q
4	2	3	Silvia Di Pietro	Italy	54.54	Q
5	3	5	Béryl Gastaldello	France	54.64	Q
6	3	4	Freya Anderson	Great Britain	54.73	Q
7	3	6	Chiara Tarantino	Italy	54.94	Q
8	2	6	Maria Ugolkova	Switzerland	55.09	Q
9	2	2	Valentine Dumont	Belgium	55.18	Q
10	4	7	Sofia Morini	Italy	55.21	
11	3	2	Costanza Cocconcelli	Italy	55.25	
12	4	5	Lucy Hope	Great Britain	55.57	Q
13	4	6	Nikolett Pádár	Hungary	55.66	Q, WD
14	4	3	Lidón Muñoz	Spain	55.69	Q
15	2	1	Sofia Åstedt	Sweden	55.76	Q
16	3	8	Tjaša Pintar	Slovenia	55.84	Q
17	2	0	Sara Junevik	Sweden	55.87	Q
18	2	8	Lena Kreundl	Austria	55.94	Q
19	3	1	Roos Vanotterdijk	Belgium	55.95	Q
20	3	3	Tessa Giele	Netherlands	55.96	
21	3	7	Nina Stanisavljević	Serbia	56.20	
22	4	8	Victoria Catterson	Ireland	56.39	
22	4	2	Danielle Hill	Ireland	56.39	
24	3	0	Ainhoa Campabadal	Spain	56.43	
25	3	9	Ieva Maļuka	Latvia	56.48	
26	4	9	Elisabeth Sabroe Ebbesen	Denmark	56.53	
27	4	1	Daria Golovati	Israel	56.71	
28	1	5	Jóhanna Elín Guðmundsdóttir	Iceland	56.79	
29	2	9	Snæfríður Jórunnardóttir	Iceland	56.81	
30	1	4	Anna Hadjiloizou	Cyprus	56.86	
31	1	6	Karyna Snitko	Ukraine	57.13	
32	1	3	Monique Olivier	Luxembourg	57.84	
33	1	7	Ani Poghosyan	Armenia	58.58	
34	1	8	Mariam Sheikhalizadeh	Azerbaijan	59.67	
34	1	2	Alisa Vestergård	Faroe Islands	59.67	
36	1	1	Hana Beiqi	Kosovo	1:03.06	
	4	0	Aleksa Gold	Estonia	Did not start	
	2	7	Isabella Hindley	Great Britain	Did not start	

=== Semifinals ===
The semifinals were started on 11 August at 18:07.

Rank	Heat	Lane	Name	Nationality	Time	Notes
1	2	4	Charlotte Bonnet	France	53.56	Q
2	1	4	Marrit Steenbergen	Netherlands	53.80	Q
3	1	5	Silvia Di Pietro	Italy	54.13	Q
4	1	3	Freya Anderson	Great Britain	54.33	q
5	2	3	Béryl Gastaldello	France	54.36	Q
6	2	6	Chiara Tarantino	Italy	54.40	q
7	2	5	Janja Šegel	Slovenia	54.57	q
8	1	6	Maria Ugolkova	Switzerland	54.79	q
9	1	2	Lucy Hope	Great Britain	55.15	
10	2	2	Valentine Dumont	Belgium	55.24	
11	2	1	Tjaša Pintar	Slovenia	55.58	
12	2	8	Lena Kreundl	Austria	55.65	
13	1	8	Roos Vanotterdijk	Belgium	55.68	
14	1	7	Sofia Åstedt	Sweden	55.79	
14	1	1	Sara Junevik	Sweden	55.79	
16	2	7	Lidón Muñoz	Spain	55.81	

=== Final ===
The final was held at 18:12.

Rank	Lane	Name	Nationality	Time	Notes
1st place, gold medalist(s)	5	Marrit Steenbergen	Netherlands	53.24	
2nd place, silver medalist(s)	4	Charlotte Bonnet	France	53.62	
3rd place, bronze medalist(s)	6	Freya Anderson	Great Britain	53.63	
4	7	Chiara Tarantino	Italy	54.13	
5	3	Silvia Di Pietro	Italy	54.18	
6	1	Janja Šegel	Slovenia	54.48	
7	2	Béryl Gastaldello	France	54.83	
8	8	Maria Ugolkova	Switzerland	54.92	
