= List of Hungarian records in swimming =

The Hungarian records in swimming are the fastest ever performances of swimmers from Hungary, which are recognised and ratified by the Magyar Úszó Szövetség (MÚSZ).

== Long Course (50 m) ==
=== Men ===
Event	Time		Name	Club	Date	Meet	Location	Ref
50 m freestyle	21.42	sf, so	Krisztián Takács	Hungary	31 July 2009	World Championships	Rome, Italy	
100 m freestyle	46.87		Kristóf Milák	Hungary	12 August 2026	European Championships	Paris, France	
200 m freestyle	1:45.54		Dominik Kozma	Hungary	25 July 2017	World Championships	Budapest, Hungary	
400 m freestyle	3:44.46		Olivér Pápai	Hungary	16 August 2026	European Championships	Paris, France	
800 m freestyle	7:41.75		Zalán Sárkány	Hungary	12 August 2026	European Championships	Paris, France	
1500 m freestyle	14:39.45		Zalán Sárkány	Hungary	15 August 2026	European Championships	Paris, France	
50 m backstroke	24.50	sf	Hubert Kós	Hungary	2 August 2025	World Championships	Singapore, Singapore	
100 m backstroke	52.20		Hubert Kós	Hungary	29 July 2025	World Championships	Singapore, Singapore	
200 m backstroke	1:52.30	sf, ER	Hubert Kós	Hungary	11 August 2026	European Championships	Paris, France	
50 m breaststroke	27.51		Mihály Flaskay	Hungary	2 August 2002	European Championships	Berlin, Germany	
100 m breaststroke	59.53		Dániel Gyurta	Hungary	29 July 2012	Olympic Games	London, Great Britain	
200 m breaststroke	2:07.23		Dániel Gyurta	Hungary	2 August 2013	World Championships	Barcelona, Spain	
50 m butterfly	22.75	sf	Kristóf Milák	Hungary	10 August 2026	European Championships	Paris, France	
100 m butterfly	49.48	ER	Kristóf Milák	Hungary	13 August 2026	European Championships	Paris, France	
200 m butterfly	1:50.34	WR	Kristóf Milák	Hungary	21 June 2022	World Championships	Budapest, Hungary	
200 m individual medley	1:54.24		Hubert Kós	Hungary	16 August 2026	European Championships	Paris, France	
400 m individual medley	4:06.16		László Cseh	Hungary	10 August 2008	Olympic Games	Beijing, China	
4 × 100 m freestyle relay	3:10.03		Hubert Kós (48.18); Szebasztián Szabó (48.29); Nándor Németh (47.27); Kristóf Milák (46.29)	Hungary	13 August 2026	European Championships	Paris, France	
4 × 200 m freestyle relay	7:05.38		Nándor Németh (1:46.28); Richárd Márton (1:47.01); Balázs Holló (1:47.67); Kristóf Milák (1:44.42)	Hungary	11 August 2022	European Championships	Rome, Italy	
4 × 100 m medley relay	3:32.13		Richárd Bohus (53.99); Dániel Gyurta (1:00.45); Kristóf Milák (50.97); Dominik Kozma (46.72)	Hungary	30 July 2017	World Championships	Budapest, Hungary	

Legend: # – Record awaiting ratification by MÚSZ; WR – World record; ER – European record;
Records not set in finals: h – heat; sf – semifinal; r – relay 1st leg; rh – relay heat 1st leg; b – B final; † – en route to final mark; so – swim-off; tt – time trial

=== Women ===
Event	Time		Name	Club	Date	Meet	Location	Ref
50 m freestyle	24.56		Petra Senánszky	Hungary	22 June 2024	European Championships	Belgrade, Serbia	
100 m freestyle	53.64		Katinka Hosszú	Hungary	5 September 2014	Singapore Swim Stars	Singapore, Singapore	
200 m freestyle	1:55.41		Katinka Hosszú	Hungary	6 November 2015	World Cup	Dubai, United Arab Emirates	
400 m freestyle	4:01.31		Ajna Késely	Hungary	21 July 2019	World Championships	Gwangju, South Korea	
800 m freestyle	8:16.37		Boglárka Kapás	Hungary	12 August 2016	Olympic Games	Rio de Janeiro, Brazil	
1500 m freestyle	15:47.09		Boglárka Kapás	Hungary	4 August 2015	World Championships	Kazan, Russia	
50m backstroke	27.99		Katinka Hosszú	Hungary	6 November 2015	World Cup	Dubai, United Arab Emirates	
100m backstroke	58.45		Katinka Hosszú	Hungary	8 August 2016	Olympic Games	Rio de Janeiro, Brazil	
200m backstroke	2:05.85		Katinka Hosszú	Hungary	29 July 2017	World Championships	Budapest, Hungary	
50m breaststroke	30.61		Henrietta Fángli	UNI Győri Úszó Sportegy.	12 April 2025	Hungarian Championships	Kaposvár, Hungary	
100m breaststroke	1:06.87		Henrietta Fángli	UNI Győri Úszó Sportegy.	9 April 2025	Hungarian Championships	Kaposvár, Hungary	
200m breaststroke	2:24.03		Ágnes Kovács	Hungary	20 September 2000	Olympic Games	Sydney, Australia	
50m butterfly	26.14		Beatrix Bordás	Hullám '91	22 April 2018	12+ Meet	Székesfehérvár, Hungary	
100m butterfly	57.54		Liliána Szilágyi	Hungary	20 May 2016	European Championships	London, United Kingdom	
200m butterfly	2:04.27	ER, sf	Katinka Hosszú	Hungary	29 July 2009	World Championships	Rome, Italy	
200m individual medley	2:06.12	ER	Katinka Hosszú	Hungary	3 August 2015	World Championships	Kazan, Russia	
400m individual medley	4:26.36	ER	Katinka Hosszú	Hungary	6 August 2016	Olympic Games	Rio de Janeiro, Brazil	
4 × 100 m freestyle relay	3:35.47		Panna Ugrai (54.46); Lilla Minna Ábrahám (53.79); Petra Senánszky (53.76); Nikolett Pádár (53.46)	Hungary	12 August 2026	European Championships	Paris, France	
4 × 200 m freestyle relay	7:48.04		Ágnes Mutina (1:56.64); Evelyn Verrasztó (1:57.20); Eszter Dara (1:59.04); Katinka Hosszú (1:55.16)	Hungary	30 July 2009	World Championships	Rome, Italy	
4 × 100 m medley relay	4:01.22	h	Dóra Molnár (1:02.04); Henrietta Fángli (1:06.63); Panna Ugrai (58.21); Lilla Minna Ábrahám (54.34)	Hungary	3 August 2025	World Championships	Singapore, Singapore	

Legend: # – Record awaiting ratification by MÚSZ; WR – World record; ER – European record;
Records not set in finals: h – heat; sf – semifinal; r – relay 1st leg; rh – relay heat 1st leg; b – B final; † – en route to final mark; so – swim-off; tt – time trial

=== Mixed relay ===
Event	Time		Name	Club	Date	Meet	Location	Ref
4 × 100 m freestyle relay	3:24.96	h	Nándor Németh (48.25); Hubert Kós (48.82); Nikolett Pádár (54.42); Minna Abraham (53.47)	Hungary	2 August 2025	World Championships	Singapore, Singapore	
4 × 200 m freestyle relay	7:30.11		Richard Marton (1:49.43); Balazs Hollo (1:46.70); Minna Abraham (1:58.61); Nikolett Pádár (1:55.37)	Hungary	22 June 2024	European Championships	Belgrade, Serbia	
4 × 100 m medley relay	3:47.15	h	Benedek Kovacs (53.76); Petra Halmai (1:08.11); Richard Marton (51.49); Fanni Gyurinovics (53.79)	Hungary	29 July 2021	Olympic Games	Tokyo, Japan	

Legend: # – Record awaiting ratification by MÚSZ; WR – World record; ER – European record;
Records not set in finals: h – heat; so – swim-off

== Short Course (25 m) ==
=== Men ===
Event	Time		Name	Club	Date	Meet	Location	Ref
50 m freestyle	20.68	r	Maxim Lobanovskij	Győri Úszó SE	14 December 2019	Hungarian Championships	Kaposvár, Hungary	
100 m freestyle	46.08		Nándor Németh	Hungary	10 December 2023	European Championships	Otopeni, Romania	
200 m freestyle	1:41.03		Dominik Kozma	Hungary	7 August 2017	World Cup	Berlin, Germany	
400 m freestyle	3:34.32		Péter Bernek	Hungary	5 December 2014	World Championships	Doha, Qatar	
800 m freestyle	7:26.84		Zalán Sárkány	Hungary	6 December 2025	European Championships	Lublin, Poland	
1500 m freestyle	14:15.51		Zalán Sárkány	Hungary	4 December 2025	European Championships	Lublin, Poland	
50 m backstroke	22.64		Hubert Kós	Hungary	13 December 2024	World Championships	Budapest, Hungary	
100 m backstroke	48.16	WR	Hubert Kós	Hungary	25 October 2025	World Cup	Toronto, Canada	
200 m backstroke	1:45.12	WR	Hubert Kós	Hungary	23 October 2025	World Cup	Toronto, Canada	
50 m breaststroke	26.56		Dániel Gyurta	Hungary	4 October 2014	World Cup	Moscow, Russia	
100 m breaststroke	56.72		Dániel Gyurta	Hungary	11 December 2009	European Championships	Istanbul, Turkey	
200 m breaststroke	2:00.48		Dániel Gyurta	Hungary	31 August 2014	World Cup	Dubai, United Arab Emirates	
50m butterfly	21.75		Szebasztián Szabó	Hungary	6 November 2021	European Championships	Kazan, Russia	
100m butterfly	49.33		László Cseh	Hungary	3 December 2015	European Championships	Netanya, Israel	
200m butterfly	1:49.00		László Cseh	Hungary	6 December 2015	European Championships	Netanya, Israel	
100m individual medley	50.56		Hubert Kós	Hungary	23 October 2025	World Cup	Toronto, Canada	
200m individual medley	1:51.36		László Cseh	Hungary	4 December 2015	European Championships	Netanya, Israel	
400m individual medley	3:57.27		László Cseh	Hungary	11 December 2009	European Championships	Istanbul, Turkey	
4 × 50 m freestyle relay	1:25.14	h	Maxim Lobanovszkij (21.12); Bence Gyárfás (21.56); Krisztián Takács (21.45); Szebasztián Szabó (21.01)	Hungary	4 December 2019	European Championships	Glasgow, Great Britain	
4 × 100 m freestyle relay	3:10.92		Nándor Németh (47.13); Dominik Kozma (47.15); László Cseh (48.70); Richárd Bohus (47.94)	BVSC-Zugló	13 December 2019	Hungarian Championships	Kaposvár, Hungary	
4 × 200 m freestyle relay	7:01.56	h	Attila Kovacs (1:45.32); Balázs Holló (1:45.72); Richárd Márton (1:44.23); Oliver Papai (1:46.29)	Hungary	13 December 2024	World Championships	Budapest, Hungary	
4 × 50 m medley relay	1:32.10		Richárd Bohus (23.42); Dávid Horváth (26.64); Szebasztián Szabó (21.77); Maxim Lobanovskij (20.27)	Hungary	8 December 2019	European Championships	Glasgow, Great Britain	
4 × 100 m medley relay	3:27.14	h	Dávid Földházi (52.17); Dániel Gyurta (56.97); Péter Holoda (51.60); Dominik Kozma (46.40)	Hungary	7 December 2014	World Championships	Doha, Qatar	

Legend: # – Record awaiting ratification by MÚSZ; WR – World record; ER – European record;
Records not set in finals: h – heat; sf – semifinal; r – relay 1st leg; rh – relay heat 1st leg; b – B final; † – en route to final mark; so – swim-off; tt – time trial

=== Women ===
Event	Time		Name	Club	Date	Meet	Location	Ref
50 m freestyle	24.05	sf	Petra Senánszky	Hungary	6 December 2025	European Championships	Lublin, Poland	
100 m freestyle	52.08	sf	Lilla Minna Ábrahám	Hungary	5 December 2025	European Championships	Lublin, Poland	
200 m freestyle	1:51.18		Katinka Hosszú	Hungary	7 December 2014	World Championships	Doha, Qatar	
400 m freestyle	3:58.15		Boglárka Kapás	Hungary	17 December 2017	European Championships	Copenhagen, Denmark	
800 m freestyle	8:08.41		Katinka Hosszú	Hungary	24 October 2014	World Cup	Beijing, China	
1500 m freestyle	15:51.34		Ajna Késely	Hungary	8 December 2023	European Championships	Otopeni, Romania	
50 m backstroke	25.95		Katinka Hosszú	Hungary	16 December 2017	European Championships	Copenhagen, Denmark	
100 m backstroke	55.03	ER	Katinka Hosszú	Hungary	4 December 2014	World Championships	Doha, Qatar	
200 m backstroke	1:59.23	ER	Katinka Hosszú	Hungary	5 December 2014	World Championships	Doha, Qatar	
50 m breaststroke	30.21	h, so	Henrietta Fangli	Hungary	25 October 2025	World Cup	Toronto, Canada	
100 m breaststroke	1:04.67		Henrietta Fangli	Hungary	24 October 2025	World Cup	Toronto, Canada	
200 m breaststroke	2:20.57		Eszter Békési	Egri Úszó Klub	14 November 2021	Hungarian Championships	Kaposvár, Hungary	
50 m butterfly	25.62		Lora Komoroczy	Hód Úszó SE	7 November 2025	Hungarian Championships	Debrecen, Hungary	
100 m butterfly	55.12		Katinka Hosszú	Hungary	11 December 2016	World Championships	Windsor, Canada	
200 m butterfly	2:01.12		Katinka Hosszú	Hungary	3 December 2014	World Championships	Doha, Qatar	
100 m individual medley	56.51	WR	Katinka Hosszú	Hungary	7 August 2017	World Cup	Berlin, Germany	
200 m individual medley	2:01.86	WR	Katinka Hosszú	Hungary	6 December 2014	World Championships	Doha, Qatar	
400 m individual medley	4:19.46	h	Katinka Hosszú	Hungary	2 December 2015	European Championships	Netanya, Israel	
4 × 50 m freestyle relay	1:36.49		Petra Senánszky (24.30); Nikolett Pádár (24.59); Panna Ugrai (24.05); Lilla Minna Ábrahám (23.55)	Hungary	2 December 2025	European Championships	Lublin, Poland	
4 × 100 m freestyle relay	3:30.10		Nikolett Pádár (52.69); Panna Ugrai (52.93); Petra Senánszky (52.58); Lilla Minna Ábrahám (51.90)	Hungary	10 December 2024	World Championships	Budapest, Hungary	
4 × 200 m freestyle relay	7:33.39		Nikolett Pádár (1:52.81); Panna Ugrai (1:52.59); Dora Molnar (1:55.39); Lilla Minna Ábrahám (1:52.60)	Hungary	12 December 2024	World Championships	Budapest, Hungary	
4 × 50 m medley relay	1:45.41		Lora Komoroczy (26.65); Henrietta Fangli (29.86); Panna Ugrai (25.52); Petra Senánszky (23.38)	Hungary	7 December 2025	European Championships	Lublin, Poland	
4 × 100 m medley relay	3:51.65		Mora Komoroczy (57.58); Henrietta Fangli (1:04.91); Panna Ugrai (56.75); Minna Ábrahám (52.41)	Hungary	15 December 2024	World Championships	Budapest, Hungary	

Legend: # – Record awaiting ratification by MÚSZ; WR – World record; ER – European record;
Records not set in finals: h – heat; sf – semifinal; r – relay 1st leg; rh – relay heat 1st leg; b – B final; † – en route to final mark; so – swim-off; tt – time trial

=== Mixed relay ===
Event	Time		Name	Club	Date	Meet	Location	Ref
4 × 50 m freestyle relay	1:28.04		Szebasztián Szabó (20.93); Adam Jaszo (20.68); Petra Senánszky (23.29); Lilla Minna Ábrahám (23.14)	Hungary	4 December 2025	European Championships	Lublin, Poland	
4 × 50 m medley relay	1:38.27		Adam Jaszo (23.52); Henrietta Fángli (29.93); Szebasztián Szabó (21.35); Petra Senánszky (23.47)	Hungary	3 December 2025	European Championships	Lublin, Poland	
4×100 m medley relay	3:41.58	h	Ádám Jászó (51.84); Henrietta Fángli (1:05.41); Panna Ugrai (57.09); Boldizsár Magda (47.24)	Hungary	14 December 2024	World Championships	Budapest, Hungary	

Legend: # – Record awaiting ratification by MÚSZ;
Records not set in finals: h – heat; so – swim-off
