= Swimming at the 2022 European Aquatics Championships – Women's 200 metre freestyle =

Women's 200 metre freestyle at the 2022 European Aquatics Championships
- Venue: Foro Italico
- Dates: 13 August (heats and semifinals); 14 August (final)
- Competitors: 40 from 22 nations
- Winning time: 1:56.26

Medalists
gold medal	Marrit Steenbergen	Netherlands
silver medal	Freya Anderson	Great Britain
bronze medal	Isabel Marie Gose	Germany

The Women's 200 metre freestyle competition of the 2022 European Aquatics Championships will be held on 13 and 14 August 2022.

== Records ==
Prior to the competition, the existing world, European and championship records were as follows.

	Name	Nationality	Time	Location	Date
World record European record	Federica Pellegrini	Italy	1:52.98	Rome	29 July 2009
Championship record	Charlotte Bonnet	France	1:54.95	Glasgow	6 August 2018

== Results ==
=== Heats ===
The heats were started on 13 August at 09:00.

Rank	Heat	Lane	Name	Nationality	Time	Notes
1	4	5	Isabel Marie Gose	Germany	1:59.17	Q
2	2	4	Janja Šegel	Slovenia	1:59.48	Q
3	2	3	Aleksandra Polańska	Poland	1:59.55	Q
4	2	6	Imani de Jong	Netherlands	1:59.57	Q
5	2	5	Nikolett Pádár	Hungary	1:59.62	Q
6	3	3	Marrit Steenbergen	Netherlands	2:00.01	Q
7	4	3	Valentine Dumont	Belgium	2:00.12	Q
8	4	4	Freya Anderson	Great Britain	2:00.14	Q
9	3	4	Charlotte Bonnet	France	2:00.21	Q
10	4	6	Silke Holkenborg	Netherlands	2:00.35	
11	3	5	Katja Fain	Slovenia	2:00.40	Q
12	4	7	Antonietta Cesarano	Italy	2:00.44	Q
13	4	2	Julia Mrozinski	Germany	2:00.59	Q
14	2	2	Alice Mizzau	Italy	2:00.67	Q
15	3	6	Ajna Késely	Hungary	2:01.08	Q, WD
16	1	3	Karyna Snitko	Ukraine	2:01.49	Q
17	2	7	Noemi Cesarano	Italy	2:01.56	
18	3	7	Linda Caponi	Italy	2:01.81	
19	3	0	Ainhoa Campabadal	Spain	2:01.88	Q
20	4	8	Snæfríður Jórunnardóttir	Iceland	2:02.00	Q
21	3	1	Océane Carnez	France	2:02.19	
22	2	0	Victoria Catterson	Ireland	2:02.56	
23	2	8	Marina Heller Hansen	Denmark	2:02.89	
24	1	4	Hanna Bergman	Sweden	2:02.91	
25	1	7	Lena Opatril	Austria	2:03.13	
26	3	8	Aleksandra Knop	Poland	2:03.15	
27	4	9	Monique Olivier	Luxembourg	2:03.36	
28	2	1	Janna van Kooten	Netherlands	2:03.49	
29	2	9	Marta Klimek	Poland	2:03.68	
30	4	1	Daria Golovati	Israel	2:03.82	
31	1	2	Alicia Lundblad	Sweden	2:03.85	
32	4	0	Sofia Åstedt	Sweden	2:03.88	
33	1	8	Caroline Wiuff Jensen	Denmark	2:04.06	
34	1	1	Elvira Mörtstrand	Sweden	2:04.25	
35	1	5	Aleksa Gold	Estonia	2:04.42	
36	1	6	Zhanet Angelova	Bulgaria	2:04.85	
37	3	9	Wiktoria Guść	Poland	2:04.99	
38	3	2	Tamryn van Selm	Great Britain	2:05.82	
39	1	0	Ani Poghosyan	Armenia	2:08.22	
40	1	9	Sara Dande	Albania	2:17.55	

=== Semifinals ===
The semifinals were started on 13 August at 18:00.

Rank	Heat	Lane	Name	Nationality	Time	Notes
1	1	3	Marrit Steenbergen	Netherlands	1:57.40	Q
2	2	4	Isabel Marie Gose	Germany	1:57.70	Q
3	2	2	Charlotte Bonnet	France	1:57.73	Q
4	1	6	Freya Anderson	Great Britain	1:57.76	Q
5	2	3	Nikolett Pádár	Hungary	1:57.80	q
6	1	4	Janja Šegel	Slovenia	1:57.94	q
7	1	2	Katja Fain	Slovenia	1:58.25	q
8	2	5	Aleksandra Polańska	Poland	1:58.87	q
9	2	6	Valentine Dumont	Belgium	1:59.50	
10	2	5	Imani de Jong	Netherlands	1:59.56	
11	2	1	Alice Mizzau	Italy	1:59.59	
12	2	7	Antonietta Cesarano	Italy	1:59.84	
13	1	7	Julia Mrozinski	Germany	2:00.37	
14	2	8	Ainhoa Campabadal	Spain	2:01.34	
15	1	8	Snæfríður Jórunnardóttir	Iceland	2:01.70	
16	1	1	Karyna Snitko	Ukraine	2:02.42	

=== Final ===
The final was started on 14 August at 19:08.

Rank	Lane	Name	Nationality	Time	Notes
1st place, gold medalist(s)	4	Marrit Steenbergen	Netherlands	1:56.36	
2nd place, silver medalist(s)	6	Freya Anderson	Great Britain	1:56.52	
3rd place, bronze medalist(s)	5	Isabel Marie Gose	Germany	1:57.09	
4	7	Janja Šegel	Slovenia	1:57.51	
5	1	Katja Fain	Slovenia	1:57.68	
6	8	Aleksandra Polańska	Poland	1:58.40	
7	3	Charlotte Bonnet	France	1:58.77	
8	2	Nikolett Pádár	Hungary	1:58.87	
