= Swimming at the 2026 European Aquatics Championships – Women's 4 × 200 metre freestyle relay =

Women's 4 × 200 metre freestyle relay at the 2026 European Aquatics Championships
- Venue: Paris Aquatic Centre
- Dates: 10 August
- Competitors: 56 from 13 nations
- Teams: 13
- Winning time: 7:45.93 CR

Medalists
gold medal	Freya Colbert; Abbie Wood; Leah Schlosshan; Freya Anderson; Theodora Taylor; Amalie Smith	Great Britain
silver medal	Nikolett Pádár; Lilla Minna Ábrahám; Ajna Késely; Panna Ugrai	Hungary
bronze medal	Kseniia Misharina; Sofia Diakova; Dariia Surushkina; Daria Klepikova; Milana Stepanova

The Women's 4 × 200 metre freestyle relay competition of the 2026 European Aquatics Championships was held on 10 August 2026.

== Records ==
Before the competition, the existing world, European and championship records were as follows.

	Team	Time	Location	Date
World record	Australia	7:37.50	Fukuoka	27 July 2023
European record	Great Britain	7:45.51	Rome	30 July 2009
Championship record	Italy	7:50.53	Berlin	21 August 2014

The following records were set during the competition.

	Team	Time	Location	Date
Championship record	Great Britain	7:45.93	Paris	10 August 2026

== Results ==
=== Heats ===
The heats were held at 11:03.

Rank	Heat	Time	Nation	Swimmers	Time	Notes
1	1	3	Neutral Athletes B	Kseniia Misharina (1:57.84); Sofia Diakova (1:58.92); Dariia Surushkina (1:58.43); Milana Stepanova (1:58.98)	7:54.17	Q
2	2	3	Germany	Maya Tobehn (1:58.58); Linda Roth (1:57.62); Nina Jane Holt (1:58.63); Nicole Maier (1:59.74)	7:54.57	Q
3	2	6	Hungary	Panna Ugrai (1:58.66); Lilla Minna Ábrahám (1:59.16); Ajna Késely (2:00.23); Nikolett Pádár (1:58.70)	7:56.75	Q
4	2	2	Italy	Anna Chiara Mascolo (1:59.37); Matilde Biagiotti (1:58.53); Bianca Nannucci (1:58.78); Alessandra Mao (2:00.89)	7:57.57	Q
5	2	4	Great Britain	Freya Anderson (1:59.12); Abbie Wood (1:57.76); Theodora Taylor (2:00.80); Amalie Smith (2:01.16)	7:58.84	Q
6	1	4	Spain	Ainhoa Campabadal (1:58.65); Alba Herrero (2:01.56); Irene Ciércoles (1:58.66); María Daza (2:00.27)	7:59.14	Q
7	1	5	Poland	Justina Kozan (1:57.92); Barbara Leśniewska (1:59.64); Aleksandra Knop (2:02.71); Zuzanna Famulok (2:00.05)	8:00.32	Q
8	2	1	Portugal	Francisca Martins (1:57.87); Anna Fomina (1:59.24); Ema Conceição (2:01.75); Mariana Cunha (2:02.35)	8:01.21	Q
9	1	7	Netherlands	Femke Spiering (2:01.62); Nynke Boerefijn (2:01.89); Yara van Kalmthout (2:00.18); Imani de Jong (1:57.98)	8:01.67	R1
10	1	6	Lithuania	Sylvia Statkevičius (2:01.45); Ieva Jurkūnaitė (1:56.52); Ieva Visockaitė (2:02.34); Ieva Nainytė (2:02.39)	8:02.70	R2
11	2	7	Sweden	Elvira Mörtstrand (2:00.04); Thilda Häll (2:00.48); Hanna Bergman (2:03.16); Sofia Åstedt (1:59.86)	8:03.54	
12	2	5	Austria	Iris Julia Berger (1:59.07); Aviva Hollinsky (2:02.30); Marlene Kahler (2:00.69); Nida Omid (2:02.21)	8:04.27	NR
13	1	2	Moldova	Maria Corlăteanu (2:16.65); Anastasia Basisto (2:18.41); Emmanuela Leu (2:16.08); Uliana Crevenciuc (2:17.64)	9:08.78	

=== Final ===
The final was held at 19:20.

Rank	Lane	Nation	Swimmers	Time	Notes
1st place, gold medalist(s)	2	Great Britain	Freya Colbert (1:55.65); Abbie Wood (1:56.72); Leah Schlosshan (1:56.80); Freya Anderson (1:56.76)	7:45.93	CR
2nd place, silver medalist(s)	3	Hungary	Nikolett Pádár (1:57.31); Lilla Minna Ábrahám (1:57.22); Ajna Késely (1:58.56); Panna Ugrai (1:56.00)	7:49.09	
3rd place, bronze medalist(s)	4	Neutral Athletes B	Kseniia Misharina (1:57.10); Sofia Diakova (1:57.70); Dariia Surushkina (1:58.54); Daria Klepikova (1:55.79)	7:49.13	
4	5	Germany	Maya Tobehn (1:58.47); Linda Roth (1:56.33); Nina Jane Holt (1:57.60); Nicole Maier (1:56.74)	7:49.14	NR
5	6	Italy	Alessandra Mao (1:59.47); Simona Quadarella (1:57.72); Matilde Biagiotti (1:58.45); Bianca Nannucci (1:58.61)	7:54.25	
6	7	Spain	Ainhoa Campabadal (1:57.33); María Daza (1:58.01); Irene Ciércoles (1:58.66); Alba Herrero (2:00.94)	7:54.94	
7	1	Poland	Justina Kozan (1:57.71); Zuzanna Famulok (1:59.41); Barbara Leśniewska (1:59.87); Aleksandra Knop (2:01.23)	7:58.22	
8	8	Portugal	Francisca Martins (1:57.80); Ema Conceição (2:02.06); Anna Fomina (2:00.66); Mariana Cunha (2:02.40)	8:02.92	
