= Swimming at the 2024 European Aquatics Championships – Mixed 4 × 200 metre freestyle relay =

Mixed 4 × 200 metre freestyle relay at the 2024 European Aquatics Championships
- Venue: Sports Centre Milan Gale Muškatirović
- Dates: 22 June (heats and final)
- Competitors: 26 from 5 nations
- Teams: 5
- Winning time: 7:30.11

Medalists
gold medal	Richárd Márton; Balázs Holló; Minna Ábrahám; Nikolett Pádár; Attila Kovács; Boldizsár Magda; Dóra Molnár	Hungary
silver medal	Bartosz Piszczorowicz; Kamil Sieradzki; Wiktoria Gusc; Zuzanna Famulok; Dominik Dudys; Aleksandra Knop	Poland
bronze medal	Danny Schmidt; Philipp Peschke; Nicole Maier; Leonie Kullmann; Jarno Bäschnitt	Germany

The Mixed 4 × 200 metre freestyle relay competition of the 2024 European Aquatics Championships was held on 22 June 2024.

== Records ==
Prior to the competition, the existing world, European and championship records were as follows.

	Team	Time	Location	Date
European record	Target time	7:22.33		
Championship record	Great Britain	7:26.67	Budapest	18 May 2021

== Results ==
=== Heat ===
The heat was held at 10:30.

Rank	Heat	Lane	Nation	Swimmers	Time	Notes
1	1	1	Hungary	Attila Kovács (1:50.83); Boldizsár Magda (1:51.63); Dóra Molnár (2:00.18); Nikolett Pádár (2:07.33)	7:49.97	Q
2	1	8	Poland	Bartosz Piszczorowicz (1:50.40); Dominik Dudys (1:51.27); Wiktoria Guść (2:02.62); Aleksandra Knop (2:11.32)	7:55.61	Q
3	1	5	Germany	Jarno Bäschnitt (1:50.78); Philipp Peschke (1:55.32); Leonie Kullmann (2:06.51); Nicole Maier (2:03.82)	7:56.43	Q
4	1	4	Serbia	Nikola Ratkov (1:51.76); Ognjen Pilipović (1:53.68); Giulia Viacava (2:06.89); Katarina Milutinović (2:05.74)	7:58.07	Q
5	1	9	Slovenia	Janja Šegel (1:59.60); Sašo Boškan (1:54.19); Arne Furlan Štular (1:54.09); Katja Fain (2:11.10)	7:58.98	Q
	1	0	Finland		DNS	
	1	2	Slovakia		DNS	
	1	3	Israel		DNS	
	1	6	Sweden		DNS	
	1	7	Bulgaria		DNS	

=== Final ===
The final was held at 20:25.

Rank	Lane	Nation	Swimmers	Time	Notes
1st place, gold medalist(s)	4	Hungary	Richárd Márton (1:49.43); Balázs Holló (1:46.70); Minna Ábrahám (1:58.61); Nikolett Pádár (1:55.37)	7:30.11	NR
2nd place, silver medalist(s)	5	Poland	Bartosz Piszczorowicz (1:48.93); Kamil Sieradzki (1:46.97); Wiktoria Guść (1:59.05); Zuzanna Famulok (2:00.13)	7:35.08	NR
3rd place, bronze medalist(s)	3	Germany	Danny Schmidt (1:49.45); Philipp Peschke (1:48.08); Nicole Maier (1:58.28); Leonie Kullmann (1:59.75)	7:35.56	
4	2	Slovenia	Sašo Boškan (1:48.23); Primož Šenica Pavletič (1:51.71); Janja Šegel (1:56.90); Katja Fain (2:00.79)	7:37.63	
5	6	Serbia	Nikola Ratkov (1:51.54); Ognjen Pilipović (1:53.34); Giulia Viacava (2:05.08); Katarina Milutinović (2:03.22)	7:53.18	
