= Swimming at the 2024 European Aquatics Championships – Women's 50 metre freestyle =

Women's 50 metre freestyle at the 2024 European Aquatics Championships
- Venue: Sports Centre Milan Gale Muškatirović
- Dates: 21 June (heats and semifinals); 22 June (final)
- Competitors: 40 from 23 nations
- Winning time: 24.56

Medalists
gold medal	Petra Senánszky	Hungary
silver medal	Theodora Drakou	Greece
bronze medal	Julie Kepp Jensen	Denmark

The Women's 50 metre freestyle competition of the 2024 European Aquatics Championships was held on 21 and 22 June 2024.

== Records ==
Prior to the competition, the existing world, European and championship records were as follows.

	Name	Nationality	Time	Location	Date
World record European record	Sarah Sjöström	Sweden	23.61	Fukuoka	29 July 2023
Championship record	Sarah Sjöström	Sweden	23.74	Glasgow	4 August 2018

== Results ==
=== Heats ===
The heats were started on 21 June at 09:30.
Qualification Rules: The 16 fastest from the heats qualify to the semifinals.

Rank	Heat	Lane	Name	Nationality	Time	Notes
1	5	6	Theodora Drakou	Greece	24.89	Q
2	5	4	Petra Senánszky	Hungary	24.96	Q
3	3	5	Jessica Felsner	Germany	24.97	Q
4	4	5	Jana Pavalić	Croatia	25.01	Q
5	4	4	Kornelia Fiedkiewicz	Poland	25.03	Q
6	3	4	Julie Kepp Jensen	Denmark	25.15	Q
7	3	3	Barbora Janíčková	Czech Republic	25.20	Q
8	5	9	Aleksa Gold	Estonia	25.23	Q
9	4	6	Teresa Ivan	Slovakia	25.26	Q
10	4	3	Kalia Antoniou	Cyprus	25.28	Q
11	3	9	Andrea Murez	Israel	25.34	Q
12	3	6	Anna Dowgiert	Poland	25.48	Q
13	5	1	Daryna Nabojčenko	Czech Republic	25.49	Q
14	3	2	Lillian Slušná	Slovakia	25.67	Q
14	4	2	Elisabeth Sabro Ebbesen	Denmark	25.67	Q
16	3	8	Anna Hadjiloizou	Cyprus	25.71	Q
17	5	3	Nina Jazy	Germany	25.73	
18	5	7	Nina Stanisavljević	Serbia	25.74	
19	2	4	Kiia Metsäkonkola	Finland	25.81	
19	3	7	Aleksandra Polańska	Poland	25.81	
21	5	2	Ana Rodrigues	Portugal	25.88	
22	5	8	Jóhanna Elín Guðmundsdóttir	Iceland	25.91	
23	4	8	Minna Ábrahám	Hungary	25.95	
24	4	7	Katarina Milutinović	Serbia	25.99	
25	3	1	Marijana Jelic	Austria	26.14	
26	2	3	Mia Pentti	Finland	26.21	
27	2	5	Jana Marković	Serbia	26.36	
28	2	7	Mariam Sheikhalizadeh	Azerbaijan	26.42	
29	2	2	Tjaša Pintar	Slovenia	26.52	
30	4	0	Mariangela Boitsuk	Estonia	26.62	
31	4	9	Cornelia Pammer	Austria	26.73	
32	3	0	Elvira Mörtstrand	Sweden	26.75	
33	2	6	Veera Kivirinta	Finland	26.80	
34	5	0	Mina Kaljević	Serbia	27.01	
35	1	5	Fatima Alkaramova	Azerbaijan	27.30	
36	2	8	Arla Dermishi	Albania	27.33	
37	2	1	Varsenik Manucharyan	Armenia	27.44	
38	1	3	Ilaria Ceccaroni	San Marino	27.56	
39	1	4	Ani Poghosyan	Armenia	27.61	
40	2	0	Jovana Kuljača	Montenegro	27.73	
	4	1	Fanny Teijonsalo	Finland	DNS	
	5	5	Neža Klančar	Slovenia	DNS	

=== Semifinals ===
The semifinals were started on 21 June at 19:20.
Qualification Rules: The first 2 competitors of each semifinal and the remaining fastest (up to a total of 8 qualified competitors) from the semifinals advance to the final.

Rank	Heat	Lane	Name	Nationality	Time	Notes
1	1	5	Jana Pavalić	Croatia	24.67	Q
2	1	4	Petra Senánszky	Hungary	24.71	Q
3	2	6	Barbora Janíčková	Czech Republic	24.92	Q
4	1	3	Julie Kepp Jensen	Denmark	24.94	Q
5	1	2	Kalia Antoniou	Cyprus	24.99	Q
6	2	3	Kornelia Fiedkiewicz	Poland	25.00	Q
6	2	5	Jessica Felsner	Germany	25.00	Q
8	2	4	Theodora Drakou	Greece	25.11	Q
9	1	6	Aleksa Gold	Estonia	25.18	
10	2	2	Teresa Ivan	Slovakia	25.24	
11	1	7	Anna Dowgiert	Poland	25.36	
12	2	7	Andrea Murez	Israel	25.52	
12	2	8	Elisabeth Sabro Ebbesen	Denmark	25.52	
14	1	1	Lillian Slušná	Slovakia	25.58	
15	2	1	Daryna Nabojčenko	Czech Republic	25.64	
16	1	8	Anna Hadjiloizou	Cyprus	25.67	

=== Final ===
The final was held at 22 June at 18:37.

Rank	Lane	Name	Nationality	Time	Notes
1st place, gold medalist(s)	5	Petra Senánszky	Hungary	24.56	
2nd place, silver medalist(s)	8	Theodora Drakou	Greece	24.59	NR
3rd place, bronze medalist(s)	6	Julie Kepp Jensen	Denmark	24.79	
4	7	Kornelia Fiedkiewicz	Poland	24.82	
5	4	Jana Pavalić	Croatia	24.85	
6	2	Kalia Antoniou	Cyprus	25.13	
7	1	Jessica Felsner	Germany	25.19	
8	3	Barbora Janíčková	Czech Republic	25.38	
