= Swimming at the 2022 European Aquatics Championships – Women's 4 × 200 metre freestyle relay =

Women's 4 × 200 metre freestyle relay at the 2022 European Aquatics Championships
- Venue: Foro Italico
- Dates: 11 August
- Competitors: 38 from 8 nations
- Teams: 8
- Winning time: 7:54.07

Medalists
gold medal	Imani de Jong; Silke Holkenborg; Janna van Kooten; Marrit Steenbergen; Lotte Hosper	Netherlands
silver medal	Freya Colbert; Lucy Hope; Medi Harris; Freya Anderson; Tamryn van Selm; Holly Hibbott	Great Britain
bronze medal	Nikolett Pádár; Katinka Hosszú; Ajna Késely; Lilla Minna Ábrahám; Zsuzsanna Jakabos; Dóra Molnár	Hungary

The Women's 4 × 200 metre freestyle relay competition of the 2022 European Aquatics Championships was held on 11 August 2022.

== Records ==
Before the competition, the existing world, European and championship records were as follows.

	Team	Time	Location	Date
World record	Australia	7:39.29	Birmingham	31 July 2022
European record	Great Britain	7:45.51	Rome	30 July 2009
Championship record	Italy	7:50.53	Berlin	21 August 2014

== Results ==
=== Heats ===
The heats were held at 10:15.

Rank	Lane	Nation	Swimmers	Time	Notes
1	3	Hungary	Lilla Minna Ábrahám (1:59.52); Zsuzsanna Jakabos (2:00.21); Ajna Késely (1:59.60); Dóra Molnár (2:01.72)	8:01.05	Q
2	8	Netherlands	Imani de Jong (1:59.48); Janna van Kooten (2:00.57); Lotte Hosper (2:01.74); Silke Holkenborg (1:59.36)	8:01.15	Q
3	5	Italy	Alice Mizzau (2:01.75); Linda Caponi (2:01.79); Noemi Cesarano (2:00.88); Antonietta Cesarano (2:00.87)	8:05.29	Q
4	1	Poland	Aleksandra Knop (2:02.26); Wiktoria Guść (2:02.38); Marta Klimek (2:02.86); Aleksandra Polańska (1:58.52)	8:06.02	Q
5	6	France	Océane Carnez (2:02.09); Giulia Rossi-Bene (2:01.46); Marina Jehl (2:02.63); Lucile Tessariol (2:00.98)	8:07.16	Q
6	2	Germany	Julia Mrozinski (2:01.67); Zoe Vogelmann (2:02.85); Josephine Tesch (2:03.93); Chiara Klein (2:01.22)	8:09.67	Q
7	7	Great Britain	Freya Colbert (2:00.59); Lucy Hope (2:02.50); Tamryn van Selm (2:03.47); Holly Hibbott (2:04.02)	8:10.58	Q
8	4	Sweden	Sofia Åstedt (2:03.67); Hanna Bergman (2:03.13); Elvira Mörtstrand (2:03.23); Alicia Lundblad (2:04.59)	8:14.62	Q
	0	Austria		Did not start	

=== Final ===
The final was held at 18:51.

Rank	Lane	Nation	Swimmers	Time	Notes
1st place, gold medalist(s)	5	Netherlands	Imani de Jong (1:58.97); Silke Holkenborg (1:58.92); Janna van Kooten (1:59.92); Marrit Steenbergen (1:56.26)	7:54.07	
2nd place, silver medalist(s)	1	Great Britain	Freya Colbert (1:58.72); Lucy Hope (1:58.98); Medi Harris (2:00.01); Freya Anderson (1:57.02)	7:54.73	
3rd place, bronze medalist(s)	4	Hungary	Nikolett Pádár (1:58.52); Katinka Hosszú (2:00.62); Ajna Késely (1:59.43); Lilla Minna Ábrahám (1:57.16)	7:55.73	
4	3	Italy	Alice Mizzau (2:00.58); Linda Caponi (2:00.06); Noemi Cesarano (1:58.81); Antonietta Cesarano (1:59.38)	7:58.83	
5	7	Germany	Julia Mrozinski (2:01.68); Zoe Vogelmann (2:01.12); Chiara Klein (2:00.16); Isabel Marie Gose (1:56.93)	7:59.89	
6	2	France	Lucile Tessariol (2:00.03); Giulia Rossi-Bene (2:00.28); Marina Jehl (2:00.83); Océane Carnez (2:00.68)	8:01.82	
7	6	Poland	Aleksandra Knop (2:01.28); Wiktoria Guść (2:01.54); Marta Klimek (2:02.32); Aleksandra Polańska (1:57.90)	8:03.04	
8	8	Sweden	Sofia Åstedt (2:04.05); Hanna Bergman (2:01.16); Elvira Mörtstrand (2:02.70); Alicia Lundblad (2:01.57)	8:09.48	
