= Swimming at the 2024 European Aquatics Championships – Mixed 4 × 100 metre freestyle relay =

Mixed 4 × 100 metre freestyle relay at the 2024 European Aquatics Championships
- Venue: Sports Centre Milan Gale Muškatirović
- Dates: 21 June (heats and final)
- Competitors: 43 from 7 nations
- Teams: 7
- Winning time: 3:25.69

Medalists
gold medal	Hubert Kós; Szebasztián Szabó; Panna Ugrai; Nikolett Pádár; Bence Szabados; Boldizsár Magda; Minna Ábrahám	Hungary
silver medal	Mateusz Chowaniec; Kamil Sieradzki; Zuzanna Famulok; Kornelia Fiedkiewicz; Bartosz Piszczorowicz; Dominik Dudys; Wiktoria Guść; Aleksandra Polańska	Poland
bronze medal	Martin Wrede; Peter Varjasi; Nicole Maier; Nina Jazy; Ole Mats Eidam; Maya Werner; Leonie Kullmann	Germany

The Mixed 4 × 100 metre freestyle relay competition of the 2024 European Aquatics Championships was held on 21 June 2024.

== Records ==
Prior to the competition, the existing world, European and championship records were as follows.

	Team	Time	Location	Date
World record	Australia	3:19.38	Budapest	24 June 2022
European record	Netherlands	3:21.81	Budapest	29 July 2017
Championship record	France	3:22.07	Glasgow	8 August 2018
Championship record	Great Britain	3:22.07	Budapest	22 May 2021

== Results ==
=== Heats ===
The heats were started at 10:18.
Qualification Rules: The 8 fastest from the heats qualify to the final.

Rank	Heat	Lane	Nation	Swimmers	Time	Notes
1	1	4	Hungary	Bence Szabados (49.82); Boldizsár Magda (49.92); Nikolett Pádár (53.98); Minna Ábrahám (55.85)	3:29.57	Q
2	1	0	Poland	Bartosz Piszczorowicz (49.86); Dominik Dudys (49.13); Wiktoria Guść (55.74); Aleksandra Polańska (55.44)	3:30.17	Q
3	1	6	Sweden	Robin Hanson (49.93); Marcus Holmquist (49.61); Elvira Mörtstrand (56.23); Klara Thormalm (56.06)	3:31.83	Q
4	1	5	Germany	Ole Mats Eidam (49.55); Martin Wrede (49.82); Maya Werner (57.29); Leonie Kullmann (57.50)	3:34.16	Q
5	1	1	Serbia	Justin Cvetkov (50.06); Andrija Petkovic (49.66); Jana Marković (56.91); Katarina Milutinović (58.77)	3:35.40	Q
6	1	3	Israel	Romano Yoav (49.97); Alexey Glivinskiy (49.48); Ariel Hayon (57.70); Andrea Murez (1:02.21)	3:39.36	Q
7	1	7	Slovakia	Matej Duša (51.25); Tibor Tistan (52.76); Lillian Slušná (1:00.87); Teresa Ivan (1:01.27)	3:46.15	Q
	1	2	Finland		DNS	
	1	8	Bulgaria		DNS	

=== Final ===
The final was held at 19:49.

Rank	Lane	Nation	Swimmers	Time	Notes
1st place, gold medalist(s)	4	Hungary	Hubert Kós (49.39); Szebasztián Szabó (48.21); Panna Ugrai (54.38); Nikolett Pádár (53.71)	3:25.69	
2nd place, silver medalist(s)	5	Poland	Mateusz Chowaniec (48.67); Kamil Sieradzki (48.61); Zuzanna Famulok (55.09); Kornelia Fiedkiewicz (54.16)	3:26.53	
3rd place, bronze medalist(s)	6	Germany	Martin Wrede (49.29); Peter Varjasi (48.26); Nicole Maier (54.68); Nina Jazy (54.78)	3:27.01	
4	7	Israel	Romano Yoav (49.92); Alexey Glivinskiy (48.44); Anastasia Gorbenko (53.93); Andrea Murez (54.73)	3:27.02	NR
5	2	Serbia	Velimir Stjepanović (48.60); Andrej Barna (47.32); Nina Stanisavljević (56.29); Katarina Milutinović (55.39)	3:27.60	
6	3	Sweden	Elias Persson (50.29); Robin Hanson (48.89); Sara Junevik (54.37); Elvira Mörtstrand (55.54)	3:29.09	
7	1	Slovakia	Matej Duša (49.64); Tibor Tistan (51.22); Lillian Slušná (55.83); Teresa Ivan (55.85)	3:32.54	
