= Swimming at the 2022 European Aquatics Championships – Women's 4 × 100 metre freestyle relay =

Women's 4 × 100 metre freestyle relay at the 2022 European Aquatics Championships
- Venue: Foro Italico
- Dates: 13 August
- Competitors: 32 from 8 nations
- Teams: 8
- Winning time: 3:36.47

Medalists
gold medal	Lucy Hope; Anna Hopkin; Medi Harris; Freya Anderson	Great Britain
silver medal	Sarah Sjöström; Louise Hansson; Sara Junevik; Sofia Åstedt	Sweden
bronze medal	Kim Busch; Tessa Giele; Valerie van Roon; Marrit Steenbergen	Netherlands

The Women's 4 × 100 metre freestyle relay competition of the 2022 European Aquatics Championships was held on 13 August 2022.

== Records ==
Before the competition, the existing world, European and championship records were as follows.

	Team	Time	Location	Date
World record	Australia	3:29.69	Tokyo	25 July 2021
European record	Netherlands	3:31.72	Rome	26 July 2009
Championship record	Netherlands	3:33.62	Eindhoven	18 March 2008

== Results ==
=== Final ===
The final was held at 19:50.

Rank	Lane	Nation	Swimmers	Time	Notes
1st place, gold medalist(s)	8	Great Britain	Lucy Hope (54.88); Anna Hopkin (53.44); Medi Harris (54.61); Freya Anderson (53.54)	3:36.47	
2nd place, silver medalist(s)	3	Sweden	Sarah Sjöström (53.12); Louise Hansson (54.21); Sara Junevik (55.12); Sofia Åstedt (54.84)	3:37.29	
3rd place, bronze medalist(s)	7	Netherlands	Kim Busch (55.21); Tessa Giele (54.60); Valerie van Roon (54.76); Marrit Steenbergen (53.02)	3:37.59	
4	6	Italy	Chiara Tarantino (54.81); Costanza Cocconcelli (54.65); Sofia Morini (54.99); Silvia Di Pietro (53.56)	3:38.01	
5	5	Hungary	Nikolett Pádár (55.19); Fanni Gyurinovics (55.04); Petra Senánszky (54.81); Dóra Molnár (54.38)	3:39.42	
6	2	France	Mary-Ambre Moluh (55.55); Marina Jehl (55.21); Lucile Tessariol (54.47); Béryl Gastaldello (54.38)	3:39.61	
7	4	Spain	Carmen Weiler (55.49); Lidón Muñoz (54.51); África Zamorano (55.44); Ainhoa Campabadal (55.57)	3:41.01	
8	1	Germany	Nele Schulze (55.49); Angelina Köhler (55.07); Josephine Tesch (57.28); Chiara Klein (56.08)	3:43.92	
