= Bartosz Piszczorowicz =

Polish swimmer

Personal information
- Born: 23 October 1999 (age 26) Kalisz, Poland

Sport
- Country: Poland
- Sport: Swimming
- Strokes: Freestyle
- Club: UKS Delfin, UKS Dziewiątka, Włókniarz Kalisz; G-8 Bielany Warszawa.
- College team: University of Louisville; North Carolina State
- Coach: Arthur Albiero (Louisville); Braden Holloway (NCSU)

Bartosz Piszczorowicz (born 23 October 1999 in Kalisz) is a Polish swimmer who competed for the University of Louisville and North Carolina State University and qualified for the 2020 Summer Olympics in Tokyo, but did not compete, though he swam both the 4x100 meter freestyle and 4x100 meter medley relay events at the 2024 Summer Olympics in Paris.

== Early life ==
Piszczorowicz was born 23 October 1999 to Iza and Robert Piszczorowicz in Kalisz, Poland and attended J. Kusocinski High School. He began his swimming career at UKS Delfin, UKS Dziewiątka, and Włókniarz Kalisz swimming clubs, before joining G-8 Bielany Warszawa.

== Collegiate swimming ==
In December 2018 Piszczorowicz moved to the USA to study at the University of Louisville and swim for coach Arthur Albiero, competing for the university team until 2020. In 2021, he transferred to North Carolina State University and joined the NC State Wolfpack swimming team where he competed for head coach Braden Holloway, a former NCSU All American swimmer, and a ten time Atlantic Coast Conference Coach of the Year. During his collegiate career, he was the Atlantic Coast Conference champion in the 200-yard freestyle in 2019, in the 4 × 100-yard freestyle relay in 2019, 2022, and 2023, and in the 4 × 200-yard freestyle relay in 2019 and 2023.

== Early international competition ==
In 2016 Piszczorowicz won a bronze medal at the European Championships in the 4 × 100-meter freestyle relay (with Karol Ostrowski, Kacper Stokowski, and Jakub Kraska). In 2017, he became the European Junior Champion in the 4 × 100-meter freestyle relay (with Karol Ostrowski, Kacper Stokowski, and Jakub Kraska). At the same event, he also won two bronze medals in the 4 × 100-meter medley relay with Kamil Kaźmierczak, Robert Kusto, and Jakub Kraska) and the mixed 4 × 100-meter medley relay (with Kornelia Fiedkiewicz, Aleksandra Polańska, and Jakub Kraska). In 2017, he also became the World Junior Vice-Champion in the 4 × 100-meter freestyle relay (with Karol Ostrowski, Kacper Stokowski, and Jakub Kraska)

== Olympics ==
=== 2020 Tokyo ===
He was registered to compete in the Tokyo 2020 Olympics but was withdrawn due to a procedural error by Polish officials.

=== 2024 Paris ===
On 3 August 2024 he represented Poland in the 2024 Olympics where he swam a personal best, and recorded a combined time of 03:33.70, finishing tenth overall with the Men's 4x100 Medley Relay. On 27 July 2024, he swam a 3:14.94 in the Men's 4x100 freestyle relay, recording a time of 3:14.94, and finishing thirteenth overall.

=== National Championships ===
At the Polish Senior Championships in a 50-meter pool, Piszczorowicz has won 10 medals:

- 2017: 100 meters freestyle: 3rd place
- 2018: 4 × 200 meters freestyle relay: 1st place
- 2019: 4 × 100 meters freestyle relay: 1st place, 4 × 200 meters freestyle relay: 3rd place
- 2021: 4 × 100 meters freestyle relay: 1st place
- 2022: 4 × 100 meters medley relay (mixed): 2nd place, 4 × 100 meters freestyle relay: 2nd place, 4 × 100 meters freestyle relay (mixed): 3rd place, 4 × 100 meters medley relay: 3rd place
- 2023: 4 × 100 meters medley relay: 1st place

At the Polish Winter Championships, he has won 13 medals:

- 2016: 100 meters freestyle: 3rd place
- 2017: 4 × 100 meters freestyle relay: 2nd place, 4 × 50 meters medley relay: 3rd place
- 2020: 4 × 50 meters medley relay: 1st place, 4 × 100 meters medley relay: 1st place, 200 meters freestyle: 2nd place, 4 × 100 meters freestyle relay: 2nd place, 4 × 50 meters medley relay (mixed): 2nd place
- 2021: 100 meters freestyle: 1st place, 200 meters freestyle: 1st place, 4 × 100 meters freestyle relay: 2nd place, 4 × 50 meters medley relay: 2nd place
- 2023: 200 meters freestyle: 2nd place

== International competitions ==
In 2024 at the 2024 European Aquatics Championships in Belgrade, Piszczorowicz won a silver medal in the mixed 4 × 200-meter freestyle relay.
