= Leonie Kullmann =

German swimmer (born 1999)

Personal information
- Full name: Leonie Marlen Kullmann
- Nationality: German
- Born: 26 August 1999 (age 26) Dresden, Germany
- Height: 175 cm (5 ft 9 in)
- Weight: 62 kg (137 lb)

Sport
- Sport: Swimming
- College team: University of Alabama
Medal record
Representing Germany
Women's swimming
European Championships (LC)
Bronze medal – third place	2024 Belgrade	4 × 100 m mixed freestyle
Bronze medal – third place	2024 Belgrade	4×200 m mixed freestyle

Leonie Marlen Kullmann (born 26 August 1999) is a German swimmer. She competed in the women's 4 × 200 metre freestyle relay event at the 2016 Summer Olympics. She is attending and competing in swimming at the University of Alabama. She qualified to represent Germany at the 2020 Summer Olympics.
