= Lucy Hope (swimmer) =

Scottish swimmer (born 1997)

Personal information
- Born: 30 January 1997 (age 29) Melrose, Scottish Borders, Scotland

Sport
- Sport: Swimming
- Strokes: Freestyle
- Club: Tring SC
Medal record
Women's swimming
Representing Great Britain
World Championships (LC)
Silver medal – second place	2024 Doha	4×200 m freestyle
Bronze medal – third place	2023 Fukuoka	4×100 m mixed freestyle
European Championships (LC)
Gold medal – first place	2018 Glasgow	4×200 m freestyle
Gold medal – first place	2020 Budapest	4×100 m freestyle
Gold medal – first place	2020 Budapest	4×200 m freestyle
Gold medal – first place	2020 Budapest	4×100 m mixed freestyle
Gold medal – first place	2020 Budapest	4×200 m mixed freestyle
Gold medal – first place	2022 Rome	4×100 m freestyle
Gold medal – first place	2022 Rome	4×200 m mixed freestyle
Silver medal – second place	2022 Rome	4×200 m freestyle
Silver medal – second place	2022 Rome	4×100 m mixed freestyle
European Championships (SC)
Gold medal – first place	2023 Otopeni	4x50 m mixed freestyle
Bronze medal – third place	2023 Otopeni	Women's 4x50 m freestyle

Lucy Hope (born 30 January 1997) is an active Scottish elite swimmer representing Scotland and Great Britain. A freestyle specialist, her most significant success has come in freestyle relay for Great Britain, for whom she has won seven gold medals at European level between 2018 and 2022. She competed at the 2020 Summer Olympics and the 2024 Summer Olympics.

== Career ==
She competed in the women's 4 × 200 metre freestyle relay event at the 2018 European Aquatics Championships, winning the gold medal. She won a further four gold medals in the 2020 European Aquatics Championships in the women's 4 x 100 metre freestyle relay and 4 x 200 metre freestyle relay, and the mixed 4 x 200 metre freestyle relay and 4 x 100 metre freestyle relay In 2022, she was part of the Great Britain team that retained their titles in the women's 4 x 100 metre freestyle and the mixed 4 x 200 metre freestyle, while winning silver medals in the women's 4 x 200 metre freestyle relay and the mixed 4 x 100 metre freestyle relay.

Hope is third on the all time women's list for Great Britain at the European Championship behind Fran Halsall and Freya Anderson.

Hope was selected for the British team for the 2024 Summer Olympics. At the 2024 Olympic Games in Paris, she participated in the women's 4 × 100 metre freestyle relay an dthe women's 4 × 200 metre freestyle relay.
