= Charles Rihoux =

French swimmer (born 1998)

Personal information
- Nationality: French
- Born: 7 March 1998 (age 28) Reims, France

Sport
- Sport: Swimming
Medal record
Men's swimming
Representing France
European Championships (LC)
Gold medal – first place	2022 Rome	4×100 m mixed freestyle
Silver medal – second place	2022 Rome	4×100 m medley
Mediterranean Games
Silver medal – second place	2022 Oran	4×100 m medley
Bronze medal – third place	2022 Oran	4×100 m freestyle

Charles Rihoux (born 7 March 1998) is a French swimmer. He competed in the men's 100 metre freestyle event at the 2020 European Aquatics Championships, in Budapest, Hungary.
