= Barbora Janíčková =

Czech swimmer

Personal information
- Nationality: Czech Republic
- Born: 1 May 2000 (age 26) Brno, Czech Republic

Sport
- Sport: Swimming
- Club: SK UP Olomouc
Medal record
European Championships (LC)
Silver medal – second place	2024 Belgrade	100 m freestyle

Barbora Janíčková (born 1 May 2000) is a Czech swimmer. She competed in the 2020 Summer Olympics.
