= Imani de Jong =

Dutch swimmer (born 2002)

Personal information
- Nationality: Dutch
- Born: 28 May 2002 (age 24)

Sport
- Sport: Swimming
- Strokes: Freestyle
Medal record
Women's swimming
Representing the Netherlands
European Championships (LC)
Gold medal – first place	2022 Rome	4×200 m freestyle
Gold medal – first place	2026 Paris	4×100 m freestyle
Silver medal – second place	2026 Paris	4x100 m mixed freestyle

Imani de Jong (born 28 May 2002) is a Dutch swimmer. She represented the Netherlands at the 2024 Summer Olympics.

== Career ==
De Jong competed at the 2022 European Aquatics Championships and won a gold medal in the 4×200 metre freestyle relay with a time of 7:54.07. This marked the first time the Netherlands won gold in the event at the LEN European Aquatics Championships.

In April 2024, she was selected to represent the Netherlands at the 2024 Summer Olympics. She competed in the 4×200-metre freestyle relay and finished in 12th place with a time of 7:57.58.

In August 2026, she competed at the 2026 European Aquatics Championships and won a gold medal in the 4×100 metre freestyle relay with a European Championships record time of 3:31.89.
