= Freya Anderson =

British swimmer (born 2001)

Freya Anderson MBE
Personal information
- Full name: Freya Ann Alexandra Anderson
- Born: 4 March 2001 (age 25) Birkenhead, Merseyside, England
- Height: 6 ft 3 in (191 cm)
- Weight: 12 st 4 lb; 172 lb (78 kg)

Sport
- Sport: Swimming
- Strokes: Freestyle
- Club: Bath Performance Centre
- Coach: David McNulty
Medal record
Women's swimming
Representing Great Britain
Olympic Games
Gold medal – first place	2020 Tokyo	4×100 m mixed medley
World Championships (LC)
Bronze medal – third place	2019 Gwangju	4×100 m mixed medley
Bronze medal – third place	2023 Fukuoka	4×100 m mixed freestyle
World Championships (SC)
Silver medal – second place	2024 Budapest	4×100 m medley
European Championships (LC)
Gold medal – first place	2018 Glasgow	4×200 m freestyle
Gold medal – first place	2018 Glasgow	4×100 m mixed medley
Gold medal – first place	2020 Budapest	4×100 m freestyle
Gold medal – first place	2020 Budapest	4×200 m freestyle
Gold medal – first place	2020 Budapest	4×100 m medley
Gold medal – first place	2020 Budapest	4×100 m mixed freestyle
Gold medal – first place	2020 Budapest	4×200 m mixed freestyle
Gold medal – first place	2022 Rome	4×100 m freestyle
Gold medal – first place	2022 Rome	4×200 m mixed freestyle
Gold medal – first place	2026 Paris	4×200 m freestyle
Gold medal – first place	2026 Paris	4×200 m mixed freestyle
Silver medal – second place	2022 Rome	200 m freestyle
Silver medal – second place	2022 Rome	4×200 m freestyle
Silver medal – second place	2022 Rome	4×100 m mixed freestyle
Bronze medal – third place	2018 Glasgow	4×200 m mixed freestyle
Bronze medal – third place	2018 Glasgow	4×100 m medley
Bronze medal – third place	2020 Budapest	200 m freestyle
Bronze medal – third place	2022 Rome	100 m freestyle
European Championships (SC)
Gold medal – first place	2019 Glasgow	100 m freestyle
Gold medal – first place	2019 Glasgow	200 m freestyle
Gold medal – first place	2023 Otopeni	200 m freestyle
Gold medal – first place	2023 Otopeni	4x50 m mixed freestyle
Silver medal – second place	2019 Glasgow	4x50 m mixed freestyle
Bronze medal – third place	2023 Otopeni	4×50 m medley
Bronze medal – third place	2023 Otopeni	100 m freestyle
Bronze medal – third place	2023 Otopeni	4x50 m freestyle
World Junior Championships
Gold medal – first place	2017 Indianapolis	100 m freestyle
European Junior Championships
Gold medal – first place	2016 Hódmezővásárhely	100 m freestyle
Gold medal – first place	2018 Helsinki	50 m freestyle
Gold medal – first place	2018 Helsinki	100 m freestyle
Gold medal – first place	2018 Helsinki	4x100 m medley
Silver medal – second place	2016 Hódmezővásárhely	4x200 m freestyle
Silver medal – second place	2018 Helsinki	4x100 m mixed medley
Bronze medal – third place	2016 Hódmezővásárhely	4x100 m freestyle
Bronze medal – third place	2016 Hódmezővásárhely	4x100 m medley
Bronze medal – third place	2016 Hódmezővásárhely	4x100 m mixed medley
Representing England
Commonwealth Games
Silver medal – second place	2022 Birmingham	4×100 m freestyle
Silver medal – second place	2022 Birmingham	4×100 m mixed freestyle
Bronze medal – third place	2018 Gold Coast	4×100 m freestyle
Bronze medal – third place	2018 Gold Coast	4×200 m freestyle
Bronze medal – third place	2022 Birmingham	4×200 m freestyle
Bronze medal – third place	2022 Birmingham	4×100 m mixed medley

Freya Ann Alexandra Anderson (born 4 March 2001) is a British swimmer, known primarily for her achievements as a freestyle sprinter, especially as a relay swimmer for Great Britain. Anderson achieved eleven relay gold medals at four editions of the European Championships, including 5 golds in a single meet at the 2020 European Championships in Budapest, as well as two bronze medals at the Commonwealth Games and a bronze at the 2019 World Aquatics Championships. In July 2021, she won gold as part of the British team at the 2020 Tokyo Olympics in mixed 4 × 100 metre medley relay, swimming the freestyle anchor leg in the heat.

Individually, Anderson has won silver and bronze medals in the 2022 European Championships (50m), and is a three time European individual champion in short course (25m), winning both 100 m and 200 m freestyle in 2019 in Glasgow, and the 200 m again in Otopeni in 2023. Anderson also won relay gold in the mixed 4 x 50 m freestyle event, again in 2023.

Anderson is a three-time European Junior and one-time World junior champion individually.

== Early life ==
Anderson started swimming lessons at the age of five and began to swim competitively when she was nine. She attended St Joseph's primary school and then Upton Hall Convent School, before winning a scholarship to Ellesmere College in Shropshire. Anderson was painfully shy as a child; she described how she almost fled College when she was caught breaking rules and using an iPad at night. At the time, she was scared of swimming and she would cry and scream when her mother took her to swimming lessons. Always tall for her age she would walk on the pool floor, and get in trouble for it. She credits swimming with boosting her confidence.

She hates swimming in the sea, lakes or any open water, and is allergic to chlorine.

== Career ==
Anderson won the 2016 British Swimming Championships 100m freestyle, with a time of 54.35. Her swim in the heats, 54.40, eclipsed British Swimming's 10 year record, and she proceeded to lower it again in the finals. Anderson won the Gold at 2016 European Junior Championships in Hódmezővásárhely, Hungary, finishing 0.25 seconds ahead of the field in the 100m freestyle with a time of 54.72. Following a highly successful season Anderson won the Emerging Swimmer of the Year prize at the 2016 British Swimming Awards.

As a junior swimmer, Anderson won the 100 metre freestyle event at the 2017 World Junior Swimming Championships in Indianapolis. A year later she became the European Junior Champion at the 50 metre and 100 metre freestyle distances at the European Junior Swimming Championships. She was also part of the Great Britain team that won gold in the women's medley relay and a silver in the mixed medley relay in what was her breakthrough year in to the British senior team.

Anderson competed in the women's 100 metre freestyle event at the 2017 World Aquatics Championships.

At the 2018 Commonwealth Games Anderson made her Commonwealth Games debut, competing for England and won bronze in the 4 × 100 m freestyle relay and in the 4 × 200 m freestyle relay events.

At the 2018 European Championships, Anderson was part of the British team that won bronze in the mixed 4 × 200 metre freestyle relay, a new event at the game. She was also part of the British teams that won gold in the mixed 4 x 100 metre medley relay and gold in the women's women's 4 × 200 m freestyle relay, and ended the championships with another bronze in the women's 4 × 100 metre medley relay. Anderson finished fourth in her individual 100 metre freestyle event, but set a new junior European record.

At the 2019 World Aquatics Championships held in Gwangju, South Korea, Anderson won a bronze as part of the team in the 4 × 100 m mixed medley relay. Anderson was named as a member of the "high quality" team to go to the postponed 2020 Olympics in April 2021. This was Anderson's first Olympics.

Anderson was named as a member of the British team to go to the postponed 2020 Olympics in Tokyo. This would be her first Olympics and she joined as part of what was considered a "high quality" swimming team. Anderson swam the anchor leg in the heat of the Mixed 4 x 100 metre medley relay, receiving a gold medal when the team, now with Anna Hopkin on anchor, won the final.

In 2023, she won two gold medals at the 2023 British Swimming Championships in the 100 metres freestyle and the 200 metres freestyle. It was the fourth time that she had won the 100 metres event and the second time that she had won the 200 metres title. Both of these were personal bests (200m freestyle1:55.89s and 53.49s in the 100m freestyle)

In 2025, Anderson regained the 100 metres freestyle title at the 2025 Aquatics GB Swimming Championships, which sealed a qualification place for the 2025 World Aquatics Championships in Singapore. Subsequently at the World Championships, she reached the final of the 4x200 metres freestyle relay.

== Awards ==
Anderson was appointed Member of the Order of the British Empire (MBE) in the 2022 New Year Honours for services to swimming.

== See also ==
- List of Olympic medalists in swimming (women)
