= Sofia Morini =

Italian swimmer (born 2003)

Personal information
- National team: Italy
- Born: 8 March 2003 (age 23) Reggio Emilia, Italy
- Height: 1.72 m (5 ft 8 in)
- Weight: 68 kg (150 lb)

Sport
- Sport: Swimming
- Strokes: Freestyle
- Club: C.S. Esercito
- Coach: Stefano Franceschi
Medal record
Women's swimming
Representing Italy
European Championships (LC)
Silver medal – second place	2026 Paris	4×100 m freestyle

Sofia Morini (born 8 March 2003) is an Italian competitive swimmer specializing in sprint freestyle.

== Career ==
Morini competed at the 2024 Summer Olympics in Paris and before at the 2022 European Swimming Championships in Rome, 2023 World Swimming Championships in Fukuoka and 2024 World Swimming Championships in Doha.

== International championships (50 m) ==
Meet	100 freestyle	4×100 freestyle	4×200 freestyle	4×100 mixed
EC 2022 (age: 19)	10th	4th		
WC 2023 (age: 20)		9th	12th	11th
WC 2024 (age: 21)		5th	10th	
OG 2024 (age: 21)		8th		
