= Nikolett Pádár =

Hungarian swimmer (born 2006)

Personal information
- Nicknames: Nikoletta, Niki
- National team: Hungary
- Born: 30 March 2006 (age 20) Szeged, Hungary

Sport
- Sport: Swimming
- Strokes: Freestyle
- Club: Szegedi Úszó Egylet
Medal record
Women's swimming
Representing Hungary
Event	1st	2nd	3rd
World Championships (SC)	0	1	0
European Championships (LC)	3	2	1
World Junior Championships	5	0	0
European Junior Championships	10	2	3
Total	18	5	4
World Championships (SC)
Silver medal – second place	2024 Budapest	4×200 m freestyle
European Championships (LC)
Gold medal – first place	2024 Belgrade	4×100 m freestyle
Gold medal – first place	2024 Belgrade	4×100 m mixed freestyle
Gold medal – first place	2024 Belgrade	4×200 m mixed freestyle
Silver medal – second place	2024 Belgrade	4×200 m freestyle
Silver medal – second place	2026 Paris	4×200 m freestyle
Bronze medal – third place	2022 Rome	4×200 m freestyle
Bronze medal – third place	2024 Belgrade	100 m freestyle
World Junior Championships
Gold medal – first place	2022 Lima	100 m freestyle
Gold medal – first place	2022 Lima	200 m freestyle
Gold medal – first place	2022 Lima	4×100 m freestyle
Gold medal – first place	2022 Lima	4×200 m freestyle
Gold medal – first place	2022 Lima	4×100 m mixed freestyle
European U23 Championships
Gold medal – first place	2025 Samorin	200 m freestile
European Junior Championships
Gold medal – first place	2021 Rome	200 m freestyle
Gold medal – first place	2021 Rome	4×200 m freestyle
Gold medal – first place	2022 Otopeni	100 m freestyle
Gold medal – first place	2022 Otopeni	200 m freestyle
Gold medal – first place	2022 Otopeni	4×200 m freestyle
Gold medal – first place	2022 Otopeni	4×100 m mixed freestyle
Gold medal – first place	2023 Belgrade	200 m freestyle
Gold medal – first place	2023 Belgrade	400 m freestyle
Gold medal – first place	2023 Belgrade	4x200 m freestyle
Gold medal – first place	2023 Belgrade	4x100 m mixed freestyle
Silver medal – second place	2022 Otopeni	4×100 m medley
Silver medal – second place	2023 Belgrade	4x100 m freestyle
Bronze medal – third place	2021 Rome	4×100 m freestyle
Bronze medal – third place	2021 Rome	4×100 m mixed freestyle
Bronze medal – third place	2022 Otopeni	400 m freestyle

Nikolett Pádár (born 30 March 2006) is a Hungarian competitive swimmer. She is a Hungarian record holder in the short course 4×100-metre freestyle relay. At the 2021 European Short Course Championships, she placed fifth in the 200-metre freestyle. At the 2022 European Aquatics Championships (long course), she placed eighth in the final of the 200-metre freestyle and won a bronze medal in the 4×200-metre freestyle relay. She is five-time World Junior Championships gold medalist, winning gold medals in the 100-metre freestyle, 200-metre freestyle, 4×100-metre freestyle relay, 4×200-metre freestyle relay, and 4×100-metre mixed freestyle relay at the 2022 World Junior Championships. She is a ten-time medalist at the European Junior Championships, including winning the European junior title in the 200-metre freestyle in 2021 and 2022 and the 100-metre freestyle in 2022.

== Background ==
Pádár was born 30 March 2006 in Szeged, Hungary and competes for Szegedi Úszó Egylet in regional and national competitions. She trains locally at a pool in Szeged, with multiple sessions in the pool a day.

== Career ==
=== 2021 ===
At the 2021 European Junior Swimming Championships, held starting 6 July in Rome, Italy at Stadio Olimpico del Nuoto, Pádár won the gold medal in the 200-metre freestyle with a time of 1:59.38. She also won a gold medal in the 4×200-metre freestyle relay, a bronze medal in the 4×100-metre freestyle relay, a bronze medal in the 4×100-metre mixed freestyle relay, placed fourth in the 4×100-metre medley relay for her contributions swimming freestyle on the preliminaries relay, and placed tenth in the 100-metre freestyle. In November of the same year, she placed fifth in the final of the 200-metre freestyle at the 2021 European Short Course Swimming Championships, held at the Palace of Water Sports in Kazan, Russia, with a time of 1:56.14 in the final after progressing through preliminaries with a time of 1:57.02 and semifinals with a time of 1:56.31. She also placed 15th in the 100-metre freestyle, 34th in the 100-metre individual medley, and 42nd in the 50-metre freestyle.

The following month, at the 2021 World Short Course Championships, in Abu Dhabi, United Arab Emirates with swimming contested at Etihad Arena, Pádár helped achieve a Hungarian record in the 4×100-metre freestyle relay with a time of 3:36.20 in the preliminaries, qualifying for the final ranking seventh before placing seventh in the final with a time of 3:36.94. She also placed fifth in the 4×200-metre freestyle relay, swimming the third leg of the relay in both the preliminaries and the final, and placed 23rd in the 200-metre freestyle with a time of 1:59.43.

=== 2022 ===
For the 200-metre freestyle at the 2022 Hungarian National Championships in Debrecen in April, Pádár won the event with a personal best time of 1:57.91 and qualified for the 2022 World Aquatics Championships in the event at 16 years, 23 days of age.

==== 2022 World Aquatics Championships ====
On the first day of pool swimming competition at the 2022 World Aquatics Championships, held in Budapest, Pádár helped achieve an eighth-place finish in the 4×100-metre freestyle relay, swimming the first 100 metres portion of the relay in 55.16 seconds to contribute to the final time of 3:38.20. Two days later, she placed 18th in the 200-metre freestyle with a time of 1:58.90. In her third and final event, the 4×200-metre freestyle relay on the fifth day, she contributed a lead-off time of 1:58.01 to the time of 7:57.90 in the final to help place fifth in the event.

==== 2022 European Junior Championships ====
2022 European Junior Championships
Gold medal – first place	200 m freestyle	1:58.43
Gold medal – first place	4×100 m mixed freestyle	3:28.83
Gold medal – first place	4×200 m freestyle	7:59.04
Gold medal – first place	100 m freestyle	54.69
Silver medal – second place	4×100 m medley	4:05.48
Bronze medal – third place	400 m freestyle	4:12.04

On 5 July, at the 2022 European Junior Swimming Championships hosted by Otopeni, Romania in July, Pádár started off with an eighth-place finish in the 4×100-metre freestyle relay, swimming a 55.37 for the lead-off leg of the relay. The following day, day two of competition, she won the gold medal in the 200-metre freestyle for her second consecutive title in the event, finishing in a time of 1:58.43. Later in the finals session, she won a gold medal as part of the 4×100-metre mixed freestyle relay, splitting a time of 54.28 seconds for the third leg of the relay. The third day, she swam the fourth leg of the 4×200-metre freestyle relay in a time of 1:57.29 to help achieve a finish in 7:59.04 and win the gold medal in the event.

Day four, in her fifth event of the Championships, Pádár swam the freestyle leg of the 4×100-metre medley relay in 54.95 seconds to help place fourth in a time of 3:54.47. The fifth day, 9 July, she won the gold medal in the 100-metre freestyle with a personal best time of 54.69 seconds, finishing 0.51 seconds ahead of silver medalist Dóra Molnár, also of Hungary, 0.65 seconds ahead of bronze medalist Roos Vanotterdijk of Belgium, and a little over one second slower than the Hungarian record of 53.64 seconds set by Katinka Hosszú. The sixth and final day, she won the bronze medal in the 400-metre freestyle with a personal best time of 4:12.04 for her first event of the finals session. In her eighth and final event of the Championships, she won a silver medal in the 4×100-metre medley relay, anchoring the relay with a time of 54.04 seconds to finish in 4:05.48.

==== 2022 European Aquatics Championships ====
2022 European Championships (LC)
Bronze medal – third place	4×200 m freestyle	7:55.73

Pádár was announced to the official 2022 European Aquatics Championships roster for Team Hungary in late July. Day one of swimming, contested at Foro Italico in Rome, Italy, she swam a time of 55.66 seconds in the preliminaries of the 100-metre freestyle, qualifying for the semifinals ranking thirteenth overall. She withdrew from further competition in the event prior to the semifinal heats. In the evening session, she led-off the 4×200-metre freestyle relay in the final with a 1:58.52, helping win the bronze medal in a time of 7:55.73. Two days later, she ranked fifth in the prelims heats of the 200-metre freestyle, qualifying for the semifinals with a time of 1:59.62. In the semifinals, she swam a personal best time of 1:57.80 and qualified for the final ranking fifth. For her final event of the day, she led-off the 4×100-metre freestyle relay in the final with a 55.19, helping place fifth in 3:39.42. In the final of the 200 metre freestyle the following day, she placed eighth with a time of 1:58.87.

The fifth day, Pádár contributed a split time of 54.98 seconds for the third leg of the 4×100-metre mixed freestyle relay in the final to help achieve a time of 3:26.54 along with Nándor Németh, Szebasztián Szabó, and Dóra Molnár and place seventh. She competed in the final of the 4×200-metre mixed freestyle relay on day six, splitting a 1:58.70 for the third leg to help place fourth in 7:34.55, which was 2.70 seconds behind the team from Italy that won the bronze medal.

==== 2022 World Junior Championships ====
2022 World Junior Championships
Gold medal – first place	4×200 m freestyle	8:04.70
Gold medal – first place	100 m freestyle	55.11
Gold medal – first place	4×100 m mixed freestyle	3:30.03
Gold medal – first place	4×100 m freestyle	3:41.94
Gold medal – first place	200 m freestyle	1:58.19

In advance of the 2022 FINA World Junior Swimming Championships, starting 30 August in Lima, Peru, Pádár was one of fifteen swimmers in the Hungarian contingent who entered to compete at the Championships. For her first event, the 4×200-metre freestyle relay on day one, she helped qualify the relay to the final ranking third with a time of 8:26.65 in the preliminaries. On the lead-off leg of the relay in the final, she swam a 1:58.37, contributing to a time of 8:04.70, and winning a gold medal. The next morning, she ranked third in the preliminary heats of the 100-metre freestyle, qualifying for the semifinals with a time of 56.28 seconds. In the evening, she qualified for the final of the 100-metre freestyle ranking first with a time of 55.62 seconds in the semifinals and was disqualified along with her relay teammates in the final of the 4×100-metre mixed medley relay when the third swimmer left early on their start.

For her first final on day three, Pádár won the world junior title and gold medal in the 100-metre freestyle with a time of 55.11 seconds. In her second final of the evening, she split a 54.41 for the third leg of the 4×100-metre mixed freestyle relay, contributing to a gold medal-winning time of 3:30.03. Splitting a 57.00 for the second leg of the 4×100-metre freestyle relay in the preliminaries two days later, she helped qualify for the final ranking second with a time of 3:51.04. She helped win the gold medal in the final, contributing to the final mark of 3:41.94 with a time of 54.90 seconds for the second leg of the relay. On the sixth and final day, she tied Giulia Vetrano of Italy for first-rank in the morning preliminaries of the 200-metre freestyle with a 2:02.00, qualifying for the final. In the evening final, she won the gold medal, this time sharing the podium with Giulia Vetrano, who finished 1.35 seconds behind her time of 1:58.19 to win the bronze medal. A little over 30 minutes later, she anchored the 4×100-metre medley relay with a time of 55.13, which was the fastest freestyle time of all relay teams in the final, helping place fourth in 4:09.33.

==== 2022 Hungarian Short Course Championships ====
In the morning preliminary heats on the first day of the 2022 Hungarian National Short Course Championships in November in Kaposvár, Pádár dropped over seven full seconds from her personal best time in the 400-metre freestyle with a time of 4:04.12. For the evening finals session, she won two silver medals, the first in the 100-metre freestyle with a time of 54.09 seconds and the second in the 400-metre freestyle with a time of 4:05.39. The following day, she finished in a personal best time of 25.39 seconds in the 50-metre freestyle to place fourth in the final. On the third day, she won the gold medal and national title in the 200-metre freestyle with a personal best time of 1:54.58, which was the only time by a female swimmer in the race faster than 1:55.00. In early December, she lowered her time in the 100-metre freestyle to a 54.07 on day one of the 2022 Hungarian Junior National Short Course Championships, held in Szeged, to win the gold medal and finish 0.02 seconds away from her personal best time of 54.05 from 2021. The following day, she won the gold medal and set a new age group record for Hungarian girls 16 years of age in the 50-metre freestyle with a personal best time of 25.06 seconds. She also achieved a new personal best time in the 100-metre individual medley on day four, where she finished 0.33 seconds behind gold medalist Lora Komoróczy with a 1:02.41 to win the silver medal.

=== 2023 ===
At the long course 2023 Hungarian National Championships in April in Kaposvár, Pádár won the national title in the 200-metre freestyle with a 2023 World Aquatics Championships qualifying time of 1:57.81.

== International championships (50 m) ==
Meet	100 free	200 free	400 free	4×100 free	4×200 free	4×100 medley	4×100 mixed free	4×200 mixed free	4×100 mixed medley
Junior level
EJC 2021	10th	1st place, gold medalist(s)		3rd place, bronze medalist(s)	1st place, gold medalist(s)	4th^{[a]}	3rd place, bronze medalist(s)	—N/a	
EJC 2022	1st place, gold medalist(s)	1st place, gold medalist(s)	3rd place, bronze medalist(s)	8th	1st place, gold medalist(s)	2nd place, silver medalist(s)	1st place, gold medalist(s)	—N/a	4th
WJC 2022	1st place, gold medalist(s)	1st place, gold medalist(s)		1st place, gold medalist(s)	1st place, gold medalist(s)	4th	1st place, gold medalist(s)	—N/a	DSQ
Senior level
WC 2022		18th		8th	5th			—N/a	
EC 2022	13th (h,WD)	8th		5th	3rd place, bronze medalist(s)		7th	4th	

^{a} Pádár swam only in the prelims heats.

== International championships (25 m) ==
Meet	50 free	100 free	200 free	400 free	100 medley	4×100 free	4×200 free
EC 2021	42nd	15th	5th	DNS	34th	—N/a	—N/a
WC 2021			23rd			7th	5th

== Personal best times ==
=== Long course metres (50 m pool) ===
Event	Time		Meet	Location	Date	Age	Ref
100 m freestyle	54.69		2022 European Junior Championships	Otopeni, Romania	9 July 2022	16	
200 m freestyle	1:57.80	sf	2022 European Aquatics Championships	Rome, Italy	13 August 2022	16	
400 m freestyle	4:11.23		2023 Hungarian National Championships	Kaposvár	20 April 2023	17	

Legend: sf – semifinal

=== Short course metres (25 m pool) ===
Event	Time		Meet	Location	Date	Age	Ref
50 m freestyle	25.06		2022 Hungarian Junior National Short Course Championships	Szeged	8 December 2022	16	
100 m freestyle	54.05	sf	2021 European Short Course Championships	Kazan, Russia	4 November 2021	15	
200 m freestyle	1:54.58		2022 Hungarian Short Course Championships	Kaposvár	18 November 2022	16	
400 m freestyle	4:04.12	h	2022 Hungarian Short Course Championships	Kaposvár	16 November 2022	16	
100 m individual medley	1:02.41		2022 Hungarian Junior National Short Course Championships	Szeged	10 December 2022	16	

Legend: sf – semifinal; h – preliminaries heat

== National records ==
=== Short course metres (25 m pool) ===
No.	Event	Time		Meet	Location	Date	Age	Status	Ref
1	4×100 m freestyle	3:36.20	h	2021 World Short Course Championships	Abu Dhabi, United Arab Emirates	16 December 2021	15 years, 261 days	Current	

Legend: h – preliminaries heat

== Awards and honours ==
- M4 Sport, Hungarian Youth Athlete of the Year (female): 2022
- M4 Sport, Hungarian Youth Athletes Performance of the Year (individual sports, women's team): 2022 (4×100-metre freestyle relay and 4×200-metre freestyle relay at the 2022 World Junior Championships)
- M4 Sport, Hungarian Youth Athletes Performance of the Year (individual sports, mixed team): 2022 (4×100-metre mixed freestyle relay at the 2022 World Junior Championships)
