= Kornelia Fiedkiewicz =

Polish swimmer (born 2001)

Personal information
- Nationality: Polish
- Born: 5 August 2001 (age 24) Legnica, Poland

Sport
- Sport: Swimming
- Strokes: Freestyle
Medal record
Representing Poland
Women's swimming
World Championships (SC)
Bronze medal – third place	2024 Budapest	4×50 m mixed freestyle
European Championships (LC)
Silver medal – second place	2024 Belgrade	4 × 100 m mixed freestyle
Bronze medal – third place	2024 Belgrade	4 × 100 m freestyle
European Championships (SC)
Gold medal – first place	2019 Glasgow	4×50 m medley
Bronze medal – third place	2021 Kazan	4x50 m freestyle
Bronze medal – third place	2025 Lublin	4×50 m freestyle
Bronze medal – third place	2025 Lublin	4×50 m mixed medley
World University Games
Silver medal – second place	2021 Chengdu	4×100m medley
Silver medal – second place	2021 Chengdu	4×100 m mixed medley
Women's lifesaving
World Games
Gold medal – first place	2022 Birmingham	4x50 m obstacle

Kornelia Fiedkiewicz (born 5 August 2001) is a Polish freestyle swimmer. She competed in the mixed 4 × 100 metre medley relay at the 2020 Summer Olympics.
