= Aleksandra Polańska =

Polish swimmer (born 2000)

Personal information
- Nationality: Polish
- Born: 24 September 2000 (age 25)

Sport
- Sport: Swimming
Medal record
Representing Poland
Women's swimming
European Championships (LC)
Silver medal – second place	2024 Belgrade	4×100 m mixed freestyle
Bronze medal – third place	2024 Belgrade	4×100 m freestyle
World University Games
Silver medal – second place	2025 Rhine-Ruhr	4×100 m medley

Aleksandra Polańska (born 24 September 2000) is a Polish swimmer. She competed in the women's 200 metre freestyle at the 2019 World Aquatics Championships and she did not advance to compete in the semi-finals.
