= Zuzanna Famulok =

Polish swimmer (born 2003)

Personal information
- Born: 14 November 2003 (age 22)

Sport
- Country: Poland
- Sport: Swimming
- Strokes: Freestyle

Zuzanna Famulok (born 14 November 2003) is a Polish swimmer specializing in freestyle, European champion.

== Career ==
In February 2024, at the 2024 World Aquatics Championships in Doha, Famulok swam in the 4 × 100-meter freestyle relay, which finished in fourth place/

Four months later, during the 2024 European Aquatics Championships in Belgrade, she won four medals. She secured gold in the 4 × 100-meter medley relay. In the mixed 4 × 100-meter and 4 × 200-meter freestyle relays, she won silver medals. She also swam in the women's 4 × 100-meter freestyle relay, which finished third.

== Achievements ==
At the 2024 European Aquatics Championships in Belgrade, Zuzanna Famulok won four medals:

- Gold in the 4 × 100-meter medley relay.
- Silver in the mixed 4 × 100-meter freestyle relay.
- Silver in the mixed 4 × 200-meter freestyle relay.
- Bronze in the women's 4 × 100-meter freestyle relay.
