= Sofia Åstedt =

Swedish swimmer

Personal information
- Born: 13 November 2003 (age 22) Skene, Sweden
- Height: 176 cm (5 ft 9 in)

Sport
- Country: Sweden
- Sport: Swimming
- Club: SK Elfsborg
Medal record
Women's swimming
Representing Sweden
European Championships (LC)
Silver medal – second place	2022 Rome	4×100 m freestyle
Bronze medal – third place	2022 Rome	4×100 m mixed freestyle
European Championships (SC)
Gold medal – first place	2023 Otopeni	4×50 m freestyle
Gold medal – first place	2023 Otopeni	4×50 m medley

Sofia Åstedt (born 13 November 2003) is a Swedish competitive swimmer. She represented Sweden at the 2024 Summer Olympics.
