= Lilla Minna Ábrahám =

Hungarian swimmer (born 2006)

Personal information
- Born: 23 March 2006 (age 20) Budapest, Hungary

Sport
- Country: Hungary
- Sport: Swimming
Medal record
Women's swimming
Representing Hungary
World Championships (SC)
Silver medal – second place	2024 Budapest	4×200 m freestyle
European Championships (LC)
Gold medal – first place	2024 Belgrade	4×100 m freestyle
Gold medal – first place	2024 Belgrade	4×100 m mixed freestyle
Gold medal – first place	2024 Belgrade	4×200 m mixed freestyle
Silver medal – second place	2024 Belgrade	200 m freestyle
Silver medal – second place	2024 Belgrade	4×100 m medley
Silver medal – second place	2024 Belgrade	4×200 m freestyle
Silver medal – second place	2026 Paris	4×200 m freestyle
Bronze medal – third place	2022 Rome	4×200 m freestyle
European Championships (SC)
Silver medal – second place	2025 Lublin	200 m freestyle
Silver medal – second place	2025 Lublin	4×50 m mixed freestyle
World Junior Championships
Gold medal – first place	2022 Lima	4×100 m freestyle
Gold medal – first place	2022 Lima	4×200 m freestyle
Gold medal – first place	2022 Lima	4×100 m mixed freestyle
Silver medal – second place	2022 Lima	200 m freestyle
Silver medal – second place	2022 Lima	200 m medley
Silver medal – second place	2022 Lima	400 m medley
European U23 Championships
Gold medal – first place	2025 Samorin	200 m freestyle
Bronze medal – third place	2025 Samorin	400 m freestyle
European Junior Championships
Gold medal – first place	2023 Belgrade	4×200 m freestyle
Gold medal – first place	2024 Vilnius	200 m freestyle
Gold medal – first place	2024 Vilnius	400 m freestyle
Gold medal – first place	2024 Vilnius	4×200 m freestyle
Silver medal – second place	2023 Belgrade	200 m freestyle
Silver medal – second place	2023 Belgrade	4×100 m freestyle
Silver medal – second place	2024 Vilnius	100 m freestyle

Lilla Minna Ábrahám (born 23 March 2006) is a Hungarian competitive swimmer. She represented Hungary at the 2024 Summer Olympics.
