= Panna Ugrai =

Hungarian swimmer (born 2004)

Personal information
- Nationality: Hungarian
- Born: 18 October 2004 (age 21)

Sport
- Sport: Swimming
Medal record
Representing Hungary
Women's swimming
World Championships (SC)
Silver medal – second place	2024 Budapest	4×200 m freestyle
European Championships (LC)
Gold medal – first place	2024 Belgrade	4×100 m freestyle
Gold medal – first place	2024 Belgrade	4×100 m mixed freestyle
Silver medal – second place	2024 Belgrade	4×200 m freestyle
Silver medal – second place	2026 Paris	4×200 m freestyle
European Championships (SC)
Silver medal – second place	2025 Lublin	4×50 m mixed freestyle
European Junior Championships
Bronze medal – third place	2021 Rome	200 m medley
Bronze medal – third place	2021 Rome	4×100 m freestyle
Bronze medal – third place	2021 Rome	Mixed 4×100 m freestyle
Women's lifesaving
World Games
Silver medal – second place	2022 Birmingham	4x50 m medley

Panna Ugrai (born 18 October 2004) is a Hungarian swimmer. She competed in the women's 4 × 100 metre freestyle relay event at the 2020 European Aquatics Championships, in Budapest, Hungary, reaching the final.
