= 2023 Russian National Swimming Championships =

Swimming competition in Russia

2023 Russian Championships
- Host city: Kazan, Republic of Tatarstan, Russia
- Date: 16–21 April 2023
- Venue: Palace of Water Sports
- Nations: 6
- Events: 42 (men: 20; women: 20; mixed: 2)

The 2023 Russian National Swimming Championships were held from 16 to 21 April 2023 at the Palace of Water Sports in Kazan, Russia. Competition was conducted in a 50-metre pool.

Events at the 50-metre and 100-metre distances were contested in a preliminaries, semifinals, finals format. Events in individual events at the 200-metre and 400-metre distances as well as relays were contested in preliminaries and finals format. Events at the 800-metre and 1500-metre distances were contested in a timed finals format with slower heats in the morning preliminaries session and the fastest heat contested in the evening semifinals and finals sessions. A second final, termed a b-final, was contested at the 50-metre, 100-metre, 200-metre, and 400-metre distances for individual events, in which only junior competitors were allowed to compete, year of birth 2005 or more recent for male competitors and year of birth 2006 or more recent for female competitors. Medalists were determined from the final open to all ages, termed the a-final.

Due to ongoing bans by LEN and World Aquatics on participation of Russians and Belarusians at their competitions, this 2023 edition of the Russian Championships was not a qualifying competition for Russians nor Belarusians for the LEN and World Aquatics competitions with qualifying time periods overlapping with the 2023 Championships.

== Results ==
=== Men's events ===
Event	Gold		Silver		Bronze	
50 m freestyle (148 competitors)	Kliment Kolesnikov; Moscow	21.91	Vladislav Grinev; Moscow	22.16	Daniil Markov; Novosibirsk Oblast - Krasnoyarsk Krai	22.21
100 m freestyle (148 competitors)	Vladislav Grinev; Moscow	47.97	Andrey Minakov; Republic of Tatarstan	48.32	Kliment Kolesnikov; Moscow	48.54
200 m freestyle (124 competitors)	Martin Malyutin; Omsk Oblast	1:45.63	Ivan Giryov; Moscow Oblast - Tula Oblast Daniil Shatalov; Moscow	1:46.80	none awarded	
400 m freestyle (69 competitors)	Martin Malyutin; Omsk Oblast	3:48.01	Daniil Shatalov; Moscow	3:48.51	Aleksandr Egorov; Moscow	3:48.66
800 m freestyle (54 competitors)	Aleksandr Stepanov; Moscow Oblast - Yaroslavl Oblast	7:42.47; NR	Kirill Martynychev; Saint Petersburg	7:50.06	Aleksandr Egorov; Moscow	7:55.86
1500 m freestyle (40 competitors)	Aleksandr Stepanov; Moscow Oblast - Yaroslavl Oblast	14:55.04	Kirill Martynychev; Saint Petersburg	14:57.90	Ivan Morgun; Volgograd Oblast	15:17.57
50 m backstroke (86 competitors)	Kliment Kolesnikov; Moscow	24.12	Pavel Samusenko; Murmansk Oblast	24.28	Evgeny Rylov; Moscow Oblast	24.66
100 m backstroke (74 competitors)	Kliment Kolesnikov; Moscow	52.54	Evgeny Rylov; Moscow Oblast	53.21	Pavel Samusenko; Murmansk Oblast	53.26
200 m backstroke (50 competitors)	Evgeny Rylov; Moscow Oblast	1:55.50	Alexey Tkachev; Saint Petersburg	1:57.20	Dmitry Savenko; Kaluga Oblast	1:57.21
50 m breaststroke (77 competitors)	Ilya Shymanovich; Belarus	26.73	Andrei Nikolaev; Kaluga Oblast	26.86	Danil Semianinov; Moscow	27.07
100 m breaststroke (76 competitors)	Ilya Shymanovich; Belarus	58.75	Kirill Prigoda; Saint Petersburg	58.98	Ivan Kozhakin; Magadan Oblast	59.04
200 m breaststroke (59 competitors)	Kirill Prigoda; Saint Petersburg	2:07.47	Danil Semianinov; Moscow	2:09.82	Mikhail Dorinov; Nizhny Novgorod Oblast	2:10.12
50 m butterfly (153 competitors)	Egor Yurchenko; Tyumen Oblast	22.94	Roman Shevliakov; Saint Petersburg	23.10	Petr Zhikharev; Moscow	23.18
100 m butterfly (100 competitors)	Petr Zhikharev; Moscow	50.88	Andrey Minakov; Republic of Tatarstan	51.23	Mikhail Vekovishchev; Kaluga Oblast	51.64
200 m butterfly (55 competitors)	Alexander Kudashev; Samara Oblast	1:55.68	Alexander Kharlanov; Penza Oblast	1:55.80	Egor Pavlov; Penza Oblast	1:56.25
200 m individual medley (79 competitors)	Ilya Borodin; Bryansk Oblast	1:57.93	Maxim Stupin; Moscow	1:58.64	Alexei Sudarev; Sverdlovsk Oblast	2:00.47
400 m individual medley (51 competitors)	Ilya Borodin; Bryansk Oblast	4:09.12	Maxim Stupin; Moscow	4:14.52	Eduard Valiakhmetov; Republic of Tatarstan	4:21.06
4×100 m freestyle relay (9 relays)	Saint Petersburg; Yegor Kornev (49.26); Alexander Shchegolev (49.07); Vasily Kukushkin (48.36); Daniil Kosenkov (49.48)	3:16.17	Moscow; Mikhail Dovgalyuk (49.76); Petr Zhikharev (49.55); Andrey Zhilkin (48.87); Vladislav Grinev (48.62)	3:16.80	Kaluga Oblast; Vladislav Gerasimenko (50.09); Dmitry Savenko (49.28); Anton Voloshin (49.54); Mikhail Vekovishchev (48.07)	3:17.06
4×200 m freestyle relay (8 relays)	Moscow; Mikhail Dovgalyuk (1:47.54); Aleksandr Egorov (1:49.66); Petr Zhikharev (1:50.16); Daniil Shatalov (1:46.87)	7:14.23	Moscow Oblast; Roman Akimov (1:48.02); Andrey Vitryak (1:53.12); Aleksandr Stepanov (1:48.27); Ivan Giryov (1:46.03)	7:15.44	Saint Petersburg; Aleksandr Shchegolev (1:47.92); Aleksandr Chiknaikin (1:49.60); Daniil Kosenkov (1:49.94); Aleksei Rtishchev (1:48.50)	7:15.96
4×100 m medley relay (13 relays)	Moscow; Kliment Kolesnikov (52.75); Danil Semianinov (59.23); Petr Zhikharev (50.65); Vladislav Grinev (47.47)	3:30.10	Saint Petersburg; Miron Lifintsev (54.10); Kirill Prigoda (58.89); Roman Shevliakov (51.61); Egor Kornev (49.22)	3:33.82	Belarus; Viktar Staselovich (55.84); Ilya Shymanovich (58.30); Grigory Pekarsky (52.40); Ruslan Skomoroshko (49.04)	3:35.58

=== Women's events ===
Event	Gold		Silver		Bronze	
50 m freestyle (116 competitors)	Arina Surkova; Novosibirsk Oblast	24.58	Maria Kameneva; Kaluga Oblast	24.97	Elizaveta Klevanovich; Tyumen Oblast	25.25
100 m freestyle (126 competitors)	Daria Trofimova; Novosibirsk Oblast	54.29	Daria Klepikova; Voronezh Oblast	54.49	Daria Surushkina; Belgorod Oblast	54.69
200 m freestyle (102 competitors)	Anna Egorova; XMAO-Yugra - Kaliningrad Oblast	1:58.63	Daria Trofimova; Novosibirsk Oblast	1:58.71	Anastasia Guzhenkova; XMAO-Yugra	1:59.02
400 m freestyle (64 competitors)	Sofya Dyakova; Republic of Tatarstan	4:07.17	Anna Egorova; XMAO-Yugra - Kaliningrad Oblast	4:07.41	Anastasia Guzhenkova; XMAO-Yugra	4:10.99
800 m freestyle (47 competitors)	Anna Egorova; XMAO-Yugra - Kaliningrad Oblast	8:31.72	Arina Pantina; Yaroslavl Oblast	8:38.50	Ariadna Frolova; Ulyanovsk Oblast	8:40.10
1500 m freestyle (41 competitors)	Sofya Dyakova; Republic of Tatarstan	16:27.73	Polina Kozyakina; Volgograd Oblast	16:31.22	Kseniia Misharina; Moscow	16:33.18
50 m backstroke (90 competitors)	Maria Kameneva; Kaluga Oblast	28.01	Elizaveta Agapitova; XMAO-Yugra	28.44	Alina Gaifutdinova; Udmurt Republic	28.57
100 m backstroke (73 competitors)	Anastasiya Shkurdai; Belarus	59.87	Maria Kameneva; Kaluga Oblast	59.99	Elizaveta Agapitova; XMAO-Yugra	1:00.68
200 m backstroke (56 competitors)	Anastasiya Shkurdai; Belarus	2:08.13	Renata Gainullina; Saint Petersburg	2:10.72	Elizaveta Agapitova; XMAO-Yugra	2:11.36
50 m breaststroke (77 competitors)	Evgeniia Chikunova; Saint Petersburg	30.78	Alina Zmushka; Belarus	30.90	Elena Bogomolova; Nizhny Novgorod Oblast	30.98
100 m breaststroke (67 competitors)	Evgeniia Chikunova; Saint Petersburg	1:04.92	Tatiana Belonogoff; Moscow Oblast	1:06.84	Alina Zmushka; Belarus	1:06.89
200 m breaststroke (48 competitors)	Evgeniia Chikunova; Saint Petersburg	2:17.55; WR	Alina Zmushka; Belarus	2:26.19	Irina Shvayeva; Saint Petersburg	2:28.56
50 m butterfly (100 competitors)	Arina Surkova; Novosibirsk Oblast	25.30; NR	Anita Grishchenko; Novosibirsk Oblast	26.01	Daria Klepikova; Voronezh Oblast	26.08
100 m butterfly (78 competitors)	Svetlana Chimrova; Saint Petersburg	57.34	Arina Surkova; Novosibirsk Oblast	57.93	Daria Klepikova; Voronezh Oblast	58.35
200 m butterfly (39 competitors)	Svetlana Chimrova; Saint Petersburg	2:08.09	Anastasia Markova; Vologda Oblast	2:09.52	Serafima Fokina; Volgograd Oblast	2:13.92
200 m individual medley (77 competitors)	Anna Chernysheva; Moscow Oblast	2:13.20	Anastasia Sorokina; Krasnodar Krai	2:13.27	Victoria Starostina; Novosibirsk Oblast	2:15.67
400 m individual medley (46 competitors)	Anna Chernysheva; Moscow Oblast	4:44.20	Irina Krivonogova; Penza Oblast	4:45.22	Victoria Blinova; Udmurt Republic	4:45.25
4×100 m freestyle relay (10 relays)	Novosibirsk Oblast; Ekaterina Nikonova (55.48); Vasilissa Buinaia (56.47); Anastasia Duplinskaya (56.09); Daria Trofimova (54.54)	3:42.58	Moscow; Anastasia Zhuravleva (56.81); Daria Mullakaeva (55.33); Elizabeta Susorova (56.44); Maria Poleshchuk (55.87)	3:44.45	Saint Petersburg; Daria Ustinova (56.06); Alexandra Kuznetsova (55.95); Alexandra Kurilkina (56.95); Jana Shakirova (55.72)	3:44.68
4×200 m freestyle relay (11 relays)	Republic of Tatarstan; Sofya Dyakova (2:00.75); Daria Ustinova (2:00.84); Anastasia Kolpakova (2:01.97); Valeriya Salamatina (1:58.60)	8:02.16	XMAO-Yugra; Polina Nevmovenko (2:00.71); Elizaveta Agapitova (2:05.98); Anastasia Guzhenkova (1:59.48); Anna Egorova (1:58.37)	8:04.54	Voronezh Oblast; Anastasia Saratova (1:59.74); Alexandra Tsvetkovskaya (2:00.95); Alexandra Litvinenko (2:10.24); Daria Klepikova (2:00.06)	8:10.99
4×100 m medley relay (13 relays)	Saint Petersburg; Vlada Eggi (1:01.18); Evgeniia Chikunova (1:05.09); Svetlana Chimrova (58.19); Daria Ustinova (55.35)	3:59.81	Novosibirsk Oblast; Anastasia Duplinskaya (1:01.10); Vitalina Simonova (1:08.78); Arina Surkova (58.83); Daria Trofimova (54.30)	4:03.01	Moscow; Daria Vaskina (1:01.71); Nika Godun (1:07.77); Anastasia Zhuravleva (1:00.08); Daria Mullakaeva (55.17)	4:04.73

=== Mixed events ===
Event	Gold		Silver		Bronze	
4×100 m freestyle relay (7 relays)	Saint Petersburg; Egor Kornev (48.73); Vasily Kukushkin (48.15); Daria Ustinova (54.32); Alexandra Kuznetsova (54.93)	3:26.13	Novosibirsk Oblast; Maxim Ablovatsky (49.34); Alexander Borovtsov (49.56); Ekaterina Nikonova (54.56); Daria Trofimova (54.02)	3:27.48	Moscow; Vladislav Grinev (48.47); Andrey Zhilkin (48.72); Daria Mullakaeva (54.56); Maria Poleshchuk (54.02)	3:27.97
4×100 m medley relay (10 relays)	Saint Petersburg; Miron Lifintsev (54.01); Kirill Prigoda (59.33); Svetlana Chimrova (57.81); Daria Ustinova (54.84)	3:45.99	Belarus; Anastasiya Shkurdai (1:00.96); Ilya Shymanovich (57.94); Anastasiya Kuleshova (58.64); Ruslan Skomoroshko (49.09)	3:46.63	Republic of Tatarstan; Nicholai Zuev (53.71); Ralina Gilyazova (1:08.94); Andrey Minakov (50.98); Valeriya Salamatina (55.53)	3:49.16

== Medal table ==
* Host nation (Republic of Tatarstan)

Rank	Nation	Gold	Silver	Bronze	Total
1	Saint Petersburg	10	7	3	20
2	Moscow	7	8	8	23
3	Novosibirsk Oblast	4	5	1	10
4	Belarus (BLR)	4	3	2	9
5	Moscow Oblast	3	3	1	7
6	Republic of Tatarstan*	3	2	2	7
7	XMAO-Yugra - Kaliningrad Oblast	2	1	0	3
8	Bryansk Oblast	2	0	0	2
8	Moscow Oblast - Yaroslavl Oblast	2	0	0	2
8	Omsk Oblast	2	0	0	2
11	Kaluga Oblast	1	3	3	7
12	Tyumen Oblast	1	0	1	2
13	Samara Oblast	1	0	0	1
14	XMAO-Yugra	0	2	4	6
15	Penza Oblast	0	2	1	3
16	Voronezh Oblast	0	1	3	4
17	Volgograd Oblast	0	1	2	3
18	Murmansk Oblast	0	1	1	2
19	Krasnodar Krai	0	1	0	1
19	Moscow Oblast - Tula Oblast	0	1	0	1
19	Vologda Oblast	0	1	0	1
19	Yaroslavl Oblast	0	1	0	1
23	Nizhny Novgorod Oblast	0	0	2	2
23	Udmurt Republic	0	0	2	2
25	Belgorod Oblast	0	0	1	1
25	Magadan Oblast	0	0	1	1
25	Novosibirsk Oblast - Krasnoyarsk Krai	0	0	1	1
25	Sverdlovsk Oblast	0	0	1	1
25	Ulyanovsk Oblast	0	0	1	1
Totals (29 entries)		42	43	41	126

== World records ==
Day	Date	Start time	Event	Stage	New time	Name	Nation	Previous time	Date	Name	Nation	Ref
6	21 April 2023	16:53	200 m breaststroke (women's)	Final	2:17.55	Evgeniia Chikunova	Russia	2:18.95	30 July 2021	Tatjana Schoenmaker	South Africa	

== Continental and national records ==
Day	Date	Start time	Event	Stage	Time	Name	Nation	Club / Country	Type	Ref
3	18 April 2023	18:00	50 m butterfly (women's)	Semifinals	25.59	Arina Surkova	Russia	Novosibirsk Oblast	Russian	
3	18 April 2023	18:25	100 m breaststroke (women's)	Semifinals	1:06.44	Alina Zmushka	Belarus	Belarus	Belarusian	
3	18 April 2023	18:50	800 m freestyle (men's)	Final	7:42.47	Aleksandr Stepanov	Russia	Moscow Oblast	Russian	
4	19 April 2023	18:15	50 m butterfly (women's)	Final	25.30	Arina Surkova	Russia	Novosibirsk Oblast	Russian	
4	19 April 2023	20:00	50 m butterfly (men's)	Time trial	22.62	Oleg Kostin	Russia	Nizhny Novgorod Oblast	Russian	
6	21 April 2023	16:53	200 m breaststroke (women's)	Final	2:17.55	Evgeniia Chikunova	Russia	Saint Petersburg	European, Russian	

== Participating nations ==
The following nations participated in the Championships.

1. Belarus
2. Kazakhstan
3. Nigeria
4. Russia
5. Syria
6. Tajikistan

== Externals links ==
- Results
