= Olga Baydalova =

- Born: June 28, 1973 (age 52); Novotroitsk, Orenburg Oblast, Russian SFSR
- Education: Orenburg State Pedagogical University (2008)
- Occupation: Swimming
- Known for: Coaching Andrei Kalina, Miron Lifintsev, Egor Kornev
- Awards: Honored Coach of Russia; Order of Friendship (2022); Order of Honour (2025)

Olga Nikolayevna Baydalova (Russian: Ольга Николаевна Байдалова; born 28 June 1973) is a Russian swimming coach specializing in adaptive sports. She is an Honored Coach of Russia and a trainer of Paralympic champions and world-class athletes.

== Biography ==
Baydalova was born in Novotroitsk, Orenburg Oblast. As a child, she was involved in swimming and reached the level of Candidate for Master of Sport. She aspired to become a coach from the age of 12, inspired by her first trainer, Yelena Aleksandrovna Tikhonova, an Honored coach of the RSFSR.

In 2008, she graduated from Orenburg State Pedagogical University with a degree in physical education.

Baydalova began her coaching career in her hometown and later moved to Saint Petersburg, where she joined the "Ekran" sports school. In the 2010s, she received the honorary title Honored Coach of Russia for her work in adaptive swimming. Since 2010, she has been a member of the Russian national coaching team in para-swimming.

== Career ==
In 2013, Baydalova began working at the "Ekran" sports school in Saint Petersburg as an adaptive swimming coach.

Since 2015, she has coached Andrei Kalina, who became a three-time Paralympic champion at the 2020 Summer Paralympics and 2024 Summer Paralympics.

During the preparation for the 2016 Rio Games, Baydalova was involved with the national team, though Russian athletes were later banned from participation. She called this period the most difficult in her professional life.

From 2021, she began working with rising athletes Miron Lifintsev and Egor Kornev, together with coach Yelena Kuznetsova. Under her guidance, Lifintsev became a five-time world champion in short course swimming in 2024.

She continues to coach at the "Ekran" school, training both Paralympians and athletes of the main Russian national swimming team.

== Notable students ==
- Andrei Kalina – Multiple Paralympic Games champion, medalist at World and European championships.
- Miron Lifintsev – World record holder, multiple world and European champion.
- Egor Kornev – World record holder, world champion, multiple-time Russian champion.

== Awards and honors ==
- Order of Friendship (July 1, 2022) – for the successful training of athletes who achieved high results at the 2020 Summer Paralympics in Tokyo, Japan.
- Order of Honour (March 3, 2025) – for coaching athletes who achieved high sports results at the 2024 Summer Paralympics in Paris.
- Honored Coach of Russia – awarded by the Ministry of Sports of the Russian Federation for achievements in preparing champions in adaptive sports.

== Quote ==
Set yourself a big goal — it's easier to hit.

— Olga Baydalova, Interview with Swimming for All, January 4, 2024.
