= List of Russian records in swimming =

The Russian records in swimming are the fastest ever performances of swimmers from Russia, which are recognised and ratified by the Russian Swimming Federation (Всероссийская федерация плавания).

All records were set in finals unless noted otherwise.

== Long course (50 m) ==
=== Men ===
Event	Time		Name	Club	Date	Meet	Location	Ref
50 m freestyle	21.06		Egor Kornev	Saint-Petersburg	9 June 2026	Russian Championships	Kazan, Russia	
100 m freestyle	46.74		Egor Kornev	Neutral Athletes B	12 August 2026	European Championships	Paris, France	
200 m freestyle	1:43.90		Danila Izotov	Russia	28 July 2009	World Championships	Rome, Italy	
400 m freestyle	3:43.45	h	Nikita Lobintsev	Russia	9 August 2008	Olympic Games	Beijing, China	
800 m freestyle	7:42.47		Aleksandr Stepanov	Moscow Oblast	18 April 2023	Russian Championships	Kazan, Russia	
1500 m freestyle	14:41.13	h	Yury Prilukov	Russia	15 August 2008	Olympic Games	Beijing, China	
50 m backstroke	23.55	sf, WR	Kliment Kolesnikov	Moscow City	27 July 2023	Russian Cup	Kazan, Russia	
100 m backstroke	51.82		Kliment Kolesnikov	Moscow City	26 July 2023	Swimming Cup of Russia	Kazan, Russia	
200 m backstroke	1:53.23	ER	Evgeny Rylov	Moscow Oblast	8 April 2021	Russian Championships	Kazan, Russia	
50 m breaststroke	26.46	sf	Ivan Kozhakin	Magadan Oblast	17 April 2025	Russian Championships	Kazan, Russia	
100 m breaststroke	58.53	h	Kirill Prigoda	Neutral Athletes B	27 July 2025	World Championships	Singapore, Singapore	
200 m breaststroke	2:06.12		Anton Chupkov	Russia	26 July 2019	World Championships	Gwangju, South Korea	
50 m butterfly	22.36	sf	Egor Kornev	Neutral Athletes B	10 August 2026	European Championships	Paris, France	
100 m butterfly	50.70		Roman Shevliakov	Saint-Petersburg	24 June 2025	Russian Cup Final	Kazan, Russia	
200 m butterfly	1:54.31	sf	Nikolay Skvortsov	Russia	12 August 2008	Olympic Games	Beijing, China	
200 m individual medley	1:56.16		Mikhail Shcherbakov	Neutral Athletes B	16 August 2026	European Championships	Paris, France	
400 m individual medley	4:08.05		Ilya Borodin	Bryansk Obalst	25 July 2022	Solidarity Games	Kazan, Russia	
4×100 m freestyle relay	3:09.52		Evgeny Lagunov (47.90); Andrey Grechin (47.00); Danila Izotov (47.23); Alexander Sukhorukov (47.39)	Russia	26 July 2009	World Championships	Rome, Italy	
4×200 m freestyle relay	6:59.15		Nikita Lobintsev (1:45.10); Mikhail Polischuk (1:45.42); Danila Izotov (1:44.48); Alexander Sukhorukov (1:44.15)	Russia	31 July 2009	World Championships	Rome, Italy	
4×100 m medley relay	3:26.93	ER	Miron Lifintsev (52.44); Kirill Prigoda (57.92); Andrey Minakov (50.17); Egor Kornev (46.40)	Neutral Athletes B	3 August 2025	World Championships	Singapore, Singapore	

Legend: # – Record awaiting ratification by All Russian Swimming Federation; WR – World record; ER – European record; e – equalled existing record;
Records not set in finals: h – heat; sf – semifinal; r – relay 1st leg; rh – relay heat 1st leg; b – B final; † – en route to final mark; so – swim-off; tt – time trial

=== Women ===
Event	Time		Name	Club	Date	Meet	Location	Ref
50 m freestyle	24.20		Maria Kameneva	Saint-Petersburg	9 April 2021	Russian Championships	Kazan, Russia	
100 m freestyle	52.98		Daria Klepikova	Neutral Athletes B	1 August 2025	World Championships	Singapore, Singapore	
200 m freestyle	1:55.08	sf	Veronika Popova	Russia	25 July 2017	World Championships	Budapest, Hungary	
400 m freestyle	4:04.10		Anna Egorova	Khanty-Mansi Autonomous Okrug	4 April 2021	Russian Championships	Kazan, Russia	
800m freestyle	8:18.77	h	Anastasiya Kirpichnikova	ROC	29 July 2021	Olympic Games	Tokyo, Japan	
1500m freestyle	15:50.22	h	Anastasiya Kirpichnikova	ROC	26 July 2021	Olympic Games	Tokyo, Japan	
50 m backstroke	26.91	sf	Alina Gaifutdinova	Neutral Athletes B	12 August 2026	European Championships	Paris, France	
100 m backstroke	58.18		Anastasia Zuyeva	Russia	28 July 2009	World Championships	Rome, Italy	
200 m backstroke	2:04.94	ER	Anastasia Zuyeva	Russia	1 August 2009	World Championships	Rome, Italy	
50 m breaststroke	29.52		Yuliya Yefimova	Russia	4 August 2013	World Championships	Barcelona, Spain	
100 m breaststroke	1:04.36	sf	Yuliya Yefimova	Russia	24 July 2017	World Championships	Budapest, Hungary	
200 m breaststroke	2:17.55	WR	Evgeniia Chikunova	Saint-Petersburg	21 April 2023	Russian Championships	Kazan, Russia	
50 m butterfly	25.30		Arina Surkova	Novosibirsk Obalst	19 April 2023	Russian Championships	Kazan, Russia	
100 m butterfly	56.42	sf	Daria Klepikova	Neutral Athletes B	27 July 2025	World Championships	Singapore, Singapore	
200 m butterfly	2:07.33		Svetlana Chimrova	Russia	6 August 2018	European Championships	Glasgow, United Kingdom	
200 m individual medley	2:09.56		Viktoriya Andreyeva	Penza Oblast	19 April 2016	Russian Championships	Moscow, Russia	
400 m individual medley	4:36.25	h	Yana Martynova	Russia	9 August 2008	Olympic Games	Beijing, China	
4×100 m freestyle relay	3:33.69		Daria Klepikova (53.22); Aleksandra Kuznetsova (53.85); Alina Gaifutdinova (53.54); Kira Manokhina (53.08)	Neutral Athletes B	12 August 2026	European Championships	Paris, France	
4×200 m freestyle relay	7:48.25		Anna Egorova (1:58.19); Anastasia Guzhenkova (1:56.43); Valeriya Salamatina (1:56.93); Veronika Andrusenko (1:56.70)	Russia	25 July 2019	World Championships	Gwangju, South Korea	
4×100 m medley relay	3:53.38	ER	Anastasia Fesikova (58.96); Yuliya Yefimova (1:04.03); Svetlana Chimrova (56.99); Veronika Popova (53.40)	Russia	30 July 2017	World Championships	Budapest, Hungary	

Legend: # – Record awaiting ratification by All Russian Swimming Federation; WR – World record; ER – European record; e – equalled existing record;
Records not set in finals: h – heat; sf – semifinal; r – relay 1st leg; rh – relay heat 1st leg; b – B final; † – en route to final mark; so – swim-off; tt – time trial

=== Mixed relay ===
Event	Time		Name	Club	Date	Meet	Location	Ref
4×100 m freestyle relay	3:19.68	ER	Egor Kornev (47.69); Ivan Girev (47.08); Daria Trofimova (52.42); Daria Klepikova (52.49)	Neutral Athletes B	2 August 2025	World Championships	Singapore, Singapore	
4×200 m freestyle relay	7:26.35	#	Grigorii Vekovishchev (1:47.52); Ivan Girev (1:45.65); Daria Klepikova (1:55.98); Kseniia Misharina (1:57.20)	Neutral Athletes B	15 August 2026	European Championships	Paris, France	
4×100 m medley relay	3:37.97		Miron Lifintsev (51.78); Kirill Prigoda (57.56); Daria Klepikova (55.97); Daria Trofimova (52.66)	Neutral Athletes B	30 July 2025	World Championships	Singapore, Singapore	

Legend: # – Record awaiting ratification by All Russian Swimming Federation; WR – World record; ER – European record; e – equalled existing record;
Records not set in finals: h – heat; so – swim-off

== Short course (25 m) ==
=== Men ===
Event	Time		Name	Club	Date	Meet	Location	Ref
50 m freestyle	20.26		Egor Kornev	Russia	1 October 2026	World Cup	Baku, Azerbaijan	
100 m freestyle	44.84	=WR	Egor Kornev	Russia	2 October 2026	World Cup	Baku, Azerbaijan	
200 m freestyle	1:40.08		Danila Izotov	Russia	13 December 2009	European Championships	Istanbul, Turkey	
400 m freestyle	3:35.30		Aleksandr Krasnykh	Russia	6 December 2016	World Championships	Windsor, Canada	
800 m freestyle	7:32.36		Savely Luzin	Sverdlosk Oblast	11 November 2025	Russian Championships	Kazan, Russia	
1500 m freestyle	14:16.13		Yury Prilukov	Russia	9 December 2006	European Championships	Helsinki, Finland	
50m backstroke	22.11	WR	Kliment Kolesnikov	Moscow City	23 November 2022	Solidarity Games	Kazan, Russia	
100m backstroke	48.58	r, ER	Kliment Kolesnikov	Energy Standard	21 November 2020	International Swimming League	Budapest, Hungary	
200m backstroke	1:46.11	ER	Arkady Vyatchanin	Russia	15 November 2009	World Cup	Berlin, Germany	
50m breaststroke	25.48	sf	Kirill Prigoda	Neutral Athletes B	14 December 2024	World Championships	Budapest, Hungary	
100m breaststroke	55.49		Kirill Prigoda	Neutral Athletes B	12 December 2024	World Championships	Budapest, Hungary	
200m breaststroke	2:00.16	WR	Kirill Prigoda	Russia	13 December 2018	World Championships	Hangzhou, China	
50m butterfly	21.28	WR	Egor Kornev	Russia	10 October 2026	World Cup	Tashkent, Uzbekistan	
100m butterfly	48.48	ER	Yevgeny Korotyshkin	Russia	15 November 2009	World Cup	Berlin, Germany	
200m butterfly	1:49.46		Nikolay Skvortsov	Russia	12 December 2009	European Championships	Istanbul, Turkey	
100m individual medley	50.26	=	Vladimir Morozov	Russia	28 September 2018	World Cup	Eindhoven, Netherlands	
100m individual medley	50.26	=	Vladimir Morozov	Russia	9 November 2018	World Cup	Tokyo, Japan	
100m individual medley	50.23	sf, #	Egor Kornev	-	8 November 2026	Russian Championships	Saint Petersburg, Russia	
200m individual medley	1:52.13		Aleksei Sudarev	Saint Petersburg	18 December 2023	Vladimir Salnikov Cup	Saint Petersburg, Russia	
400m individual medley	3:56.47	ER, WJR	Ilya Borodin	Russian Swimming Federation	20 December 2021	World Championships	Abu Dhabi, United Arab Emirates	
4×50m freestyle relay	1:22.22		Vladimir Morozov (20.39); Evgeny Sedov (20.82); Ivan Kuzmenko (20.64); Evgeny Rylov (20.37)	Russia	14 December 2018	World Championships	Hangzhou, China	
4×100m freestyle relay	3:03.11	ER	Vladislav Grinev (46.38); Sergey Fesikov (46.21); Vladimir Morozov (45.06); Kliment Kolesnikov (45.46)	Russia	11 December 2018	World Championships	Hangzhou, China	
4×200m freestyle relay	6:46.84	ER	Martin Malyutin (1:42.34); Mikhail Vekovishchev (1:41.57); Ivan Girev (1:41.85); Aleksandr Krasnykh (1:41.08)	Russia	14 December 2018	World Championships	Hangzhou, China	
4×50m medley relay	1:30.44		Kliment Kolesnikov (22.83); Kirill Prigoda (25.26); Aleksandr Popkov (22.11); Vladimir Morozov (20.24)	Russia	17 December 2017	European Championships	Copenhagen, Denmark	
4×100m medley relay	3:18.68	WR	Miron Lifintsev (49.31); Kirill Prigoda (55.15); Andrey Minakov (48.80); Egor Kornev (45.42)	Neutral Athletes B	15 December 2024	World Championships	Budapest, Hungary	

Legend: # – Record awaiting ratification by All Russian Swimming Federation; WR – World record; ER – European record; e – equalled existing record;
Records not set in finals: h – heat; sf – semifinal; r – relay 1st leg; rh – relay heat 1st leg; b – B final; † – en route to final mark; so – swim-off; tt – time trial

=== Women ===
Event	Time		Name	Club	Date	Meet	Location	Ref
50 m freestyle	23.34		Maria Kameneva	Kaluga Oblast	16 December 2022	Vladimir Salnikov Cup	Saint Petersburg, Russia	
100 m freestyle	51.62		Daria Klepikova	Neutral Athletes B	12 December 2024	World Championships	Budapest, Hungary	
200 m freestyle	1:52.46		Veronika Popova	Russia	5 December 2015	European Championships	Netanya, Israel	
400 m freestyle	3:58.25		Veronika Andrusenko	Tatarstan	8 November 2019	Russian Championships	Kazan, Russia	
800 m freestyle	8:04.65		Anastasiya Kirpichnikova	Russia	3 November 2021	European Championships	Kazan, Russia	
1500 m freestyle	15:18.30		Anastasiya Kirpichnikova	Russia	5 November 2021	European Championships	Kazan, Russia	
50m backstroke	25.60	=ER	Maria Kameneva	Kaluga Oblast	24 November 2022	Solidarity Games	Kazan, Russia	
100m backstroke	55.83		Maria Kameneva	Kaluga Oblast	18 December 2022	Vladimir Salnikov Cup	Saint Petersburg, Russia	
200m backstroke	2:01.57		Daria Ustinova	Russia	4 December 2015	European Championships	Netanya, Israel	
50m breaststroke	28.71	X	Yuliya Yefimova	Russia	10 November 2013	World Cup	Tokyo, Japan	
50m breaststroke	29.08		Yuliya Yefimova	Russia	31 August 2016	World Cup	Berlin, Germany	
100m breaststroke	1:02.91		Yuliya Yefimova	Russia	3 September 2016	World Cup	Moscow, Russia	
200m breaststroke	2:14.70	ER	Evgeniia Chikunova	Saint Petersburg	25 November 2022	Solidarity Games	Kazan, Russia	
200m breaststroke	2:14.39	X	Yuliya Yefimova	Russia	13 December 2013	European Championships	Herning, Denmark	
50m butterfly	24.58	sf	Arina Surkova	Novosibirsk Oblast	22 November 2023	Russian Championships	Saint Petersburg, Russia	
100m butterfly	55.63		Arina Surkova	Novosibirsk Oblast	25 November 2023	Russian Championships	Saint Petersburg, Russia	
200m butterfly	2:03.76		Svetlana Chimrova	New York Breakers	30 September 2021	International Swimming League	Naples, Italy	
100m individual medley	57.59		Maria Kameneva	Russia	6 December 2019	European Championships	Glasgow, Great Britain	
200m individual medley	2:06.79		Yuliya Yefimova	Russia	3 September 2016	World Cup	Moscow, Russia	
400m individual medley	4:31.13		Anastasia Ivanenko	Russia	15 November 2009	World Cup	Berlin, Germany	
4×50m freestyle relay	1:34.92		Rozaliya Nasretdinova (24.18); Arina Surkova (23.41); Maria Kameneva (23.70); Daria Klepikova (23.63)	Russia	2 November 2021	European Championships	Kazan, Russia	
4×100m freestyle relay	3:28.73		Daria Klepikova (51.96); Daria Trofimova (51.36); Milana Stepanova (53.27); Arina Surkova (52.14)	Neutral Athletes B	10 December 2024	World Championships	Budapest, Hungary	
4×200m freestyle relay	7:36.64		Anna Egorova (1:54.18); Daria Mullakaeva (1:55.22); Anastasia Guzhenkova (1:53.94); Veronika Andrusenko (1:53.30)	Russia	15 December 2018	World Championships	Hangzhou, China	
4×50m medley relay	1:44.19		Maria Kameneva (26.42); Nika Godun (29.47); Arina Surkova (24.49); Daria Klepikova (23.81)	Russia	4 November 2021	European Championships	Kazan, Russia	
4×100m medley relay	3:49.35		Elizaveta Agapitova (58.16); Evgeniia Chikunova (1:03.26); Arina Surkova (56.48); Daria Klepikova (51.45)	Neutral Athletes B	15 December 2024	World Championships	Budapest, Hungary	

Legend: # – Record awaiting ratification by All Russian Swimming Federation; WR – World record; ER – European record; e – equalled existing record;
Records not set in finals: h – heat; sf – semifinal; r – relay 1st leg; rh – relay heat 1st leg; b – B final; † – en route to final mark; so – swim-off; tt – time trial

=== Mixed relay ===
Event	Time		Name	Club	Date	Meet	Location	Ref
4×50 m freestyle relay	1:28.31	ER	Vladimir Morozov (20.65); Vladislav Grinev (20.65); Arina Surkova (23.87); Maria Kameneva (23.14)	Russia	7 December 2019	European Championships	Glasgow, Great Britain	
4×50 m medley relay	1:35.36	ER	Miron Lifincev (22.39); Kirill Prigoda (24.94); Arina Surkova (24.43); Daria Trofimova (23.60)	Neutral Athletes B	11 December 2024	World Championships	Budapest, Hungary	
4×100 m medley relay	3:30.47	not officially ratified	Miron Lifintsev (48.90); Kirill Prigoda (54.86); Arina Surkova (55.63); Daria Klepikova (51.08)	Neutral Athletes B	14 December 2024	World Championships	Budapest, Hungary	

Legend: # – Record awaiting ratification by All Russian Swimming Federation; e – equalled existing record;
Records not set in finals: h – heat; so – swim-off
