= Lidia Kapkova =

Russian swimming coach

Lidia Aleksandrovna Kapkova
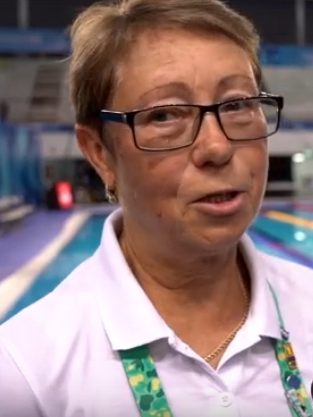
- Born: October 22, 1950 (age 75); Novorossiysk, Krasnodar Krai, Russia
- Education: Krasnodar State Institute of Physical Culture (1973)
- Occupation: Swimming coach
- Years active: 1973–present
- Known for: Coaching the Russian Youth National Swimming Team
- Awards: Honored Coach of Russia (2010): Russian Federation Presidential Certificate of Honour (2013)

Lidia Aleksandrovna Kapkova (Russian: Лидия Александровна Капкова; born October 22, 1950, Novorossiysk, Krasnodar Krai) is a Soviet - Russian swimming coach, Honored Coach of Russia. She is the head coach of the Russian Youth National Swimming Team and holds the title of Master of Sports of the USSR.

== Biography and career ==
Lidiya Aleksandrovna Kapkova was born on October 22, 1950, in Novorossiysk, Krasnodar Krai. She specialized in swimming and earned the title of Master of Sports of the USSR. In 1973, she graduated from the Krasnodar State Institute of Physical Culture (GISFK).

- 1969–1973: Instructor-Methodist at the Training and Swimming Pool of DOSAAF (Novorossiysk).
- From 1973: Coach and Teacher at the "Kedr" sports club (Sverdlovsk-44, now Novouralsk, Sverdlovsk Oblast).
- From September 2004: Coach and teacher at sports school No. 4 (Novouralsk).
- From 2008: Coach of the Russian Youth National Swimming Team.
- From 2009: Senior Coach of the Russian Youth National Swimming Team.
- From 2013: Head Coach of the Russian Youth National Swimming Team.

== Notable trainees ==
- Danila Izotov - Honored Master of Sports of Russia, two-time Olympic medalist, multiple World champion, European champion, Russian champion, two-time former world record holder, multiple Russian record holder.
- Evgenia Chikunova - Honored Master of Sports of Russia, multiple medalist at the World Championships, European champion, world record holder.

== Awards and achievements ==
Master of Sports of the USSR

Honored Coach of Russia (2010)

Honored Worker of Physical Culture (2010)

Certificate of Honour from the President of the Russian Federation (2013)

== Quote ==
Looking at things as objectively as possible, we won the most medals in 2015 – including 23 gold medals at the European Championships. It seemed like the athletes were setting various records in almost every race. Perhaps I can say now that that team was, shall we say, the most productive. But I will never say out loud, or even think, that one team was better and another was worse. This is my subjective opinion, if you will, my subjective assessment. Because only the good things remain in the memory for a long time. And there was much good, mind you, much good, giving rise to exclusively positive emotions, that each of our national teams gave us. And I am sure that this will continue.
