= 2024 World Aquatics Swimming Championships (25 m) – Women's 100 metre freestyle =

Swimming competition

Women's 100 metre freestyle at the 2024 World Aquatics Swimming Championships (25 m)
- Venue: Duna Arena
- Location: Budapest, Hungary
- Dates: 11 December (heats and semifinals); 12 December (final)
- Competitors: 76 from 66 nations
- Winning time: 50.31 CR AM

Medalists
gold medal	Gretchen Walsh	United States
silver medal	Béryl Gastaldello	France
bronze medal	Kate Douglass	United States

The women's 100 metre freestyle event at the 2024 World Aquatics Swimming Championships (25 m) was held from 11 to 12 December 2024 at the Duna Arena in Budapest, Hungary.

== Records ==
Prior to the competition, the existing world and championship records were as follows.

World record	Cate Campbell (AUS)	50.25	Adelaide, Australia	26 October 2017
Competition record	Emma McKeon (AUS)	50.77	Melbourne, Australia	15 December 2022

The following record was established during the competition:

Date	Event	Name	Nationality	Time	Record
11 December	Semifinal 2	Gretchen Walsh	United States	50.49	CR
12 December	Final	Gretchen Walsh	United States	50.31	CR

== Results ==
=== Heats ===
The heats were started on 11 December at 09:02.

Rank	Heat	Lane	Name	Nationality	Time	Notes
1	7	7	Gretchen Walsh	United States	51.64	Q
2	6	4	Siobhán Haughey	Hong Kong	52.12	Q
3	6	5	Freya Anderson	Great Britain	52.27	Q
3	8	4	Kate Douglass	United States	52.27	Q
5	8	3	Daria Trofimova	Neutral Athletes B	52.30	Q
6	7	4	Béryl Gastaldello	France	52.47	Q
7	6	3	Sara Curtis	Italy	52.51	Q
7	7	3	Milla Jansen	Australia	52.51	Q
9	5	5	Nina Holt	Germany	52.73	Q
10	7	6	Milou van Wijk	Netherlands	52.76	Q
11	6	7	Snæfríður Jórunnardóttir	Iceland	52.77	Q, NR
12	7	5	Katarzyna Wasick	Poland	52.80	Q
13	8	2	Sara Junevik	Sweden	52.84	Q
14	8	5	Daria Klepikova	Neutral Athletes B	52.97	Q
15	7	2	Barbora Janíčková	Czech Republic	52.99	Q
16	6	6	Sofia Morini	Italy	53.02	Q
17	6	0	Sofia Åstedt	Sweden	53.12	R
18	8	1	Analia Pigrée	France	53.25	R
19	8	6	Liu Shuhan	China	53.33	
20	8	9	Iris Julia Berger	Austria	53.35	NR
21	6	8	María Daza	Spain	53.38	
22	6	1	Li Sum Yiu	Hong Kong	53.41	
23	5	3	Kalia Antoniou	Cyprus	53.45	NR
24	7	1	Luo Mingyu	China	53.50	
24	7	9	Penny Oleksiak	Canada	53.50	
26	8	7	Danielle Hill	Ireland	53.66	
27	7	0	Nikolett Pádár	Hungary	53.69	
28	5	1	Hedda Øritsland	Norway	53.79	
28	7	8	Nicole Maier	Germany	53.79	
30	8	8	Panna Ugrai	Hungary	53.82	
31	4	3	Zoe Pedersen	New Zealand	53.86	
32	5	4	Caitlin de Lange	South Africa	53.91	
33	4	4	Jillian Crooks	Cayman Islands	54.13	NR
34	6	9	Kornelia Fiedkiewicz	Poland	54.17	
35	8	0	Yume Jinno	Japan	54.24	
36	4	6	Gloria Muzito	Uganda	54.45	NR
37	5	2	Lillian Slušná	Slovakia	54.52	
38	5	8	Smiltė Plytnykaitė	Lithuania	54.64	
39	5	6	Hur Yeon-kyung	South Korea	54.66	
40	5	7	Fernanda Celidonio	Brazil	54.69	
41	5	9	Liu Pei-yin	Chinese Taipei	55.02	
42	4	1	Maria Drasidou	Greece	55.29	
43	4	5	Rafaela Fernandini	Peru	55.47	
44	5	0	Nicholle Toh	Singapore	55.67	
45	4	8	Marina Spadoni	El Salvador	55.70	NR
46	4	9	Elisabeth Timmer	Aruba	55.77	NR
47	4	7	Andrea Becali	Cuba	55.83	
48	4	2	Carla González	Venezuela	55.96	
49	4	0	Paige van der Westhuizen	Zimbabwe	56.93	
50	3	3	Sara Mose	Kenya	57.12	
50	3	4	Pak Mi-song	North Korea	57.12	
52	3	5	Hana Beiqi	Kosovo	57.79	
53	3	7	Aunjelique Liddie	Antigua and Barbuda	58.02	NR
54	3	1	Adaku Nkem Nwandu	Nigeria	58.21	
55	3	6	Darielys Ortiz	Dominican Republic	58.52	
56	2	4	Christina Rach	Eritrea	58.74	
57	3	0	Riley Miller	United States Virgin Islands	58.87	NR
58	3	2	Mia Laban	Cook Islands	59.01	
59	3	8	Aiymkyz Aidaralieva	Kyrgyzstan	59.56	
60	3	9	Antsa Rabejaona	Madagascar	59.66	NR
61	1	6	Maral Batsanal	Mongolia	1:00.08	
62	2	0	Naekeisha Louis	Saint Lucia	1:00.33	
63	2	7	Marseleima Moss	Fiji	1:00.48	
64	2	6	Kaltra Meca	Albania	1:00.51	
65	2	5	Anastasiya Morginshtern	Turkmenistan	1:00.98	NR
66	2	3	Valentina Howell	Panama	1:01.15	
67	2	2	Kaiya Brown	Samoa	1:01.22	
68	1	0	Sharmeen Mohd Mharvin	Brunei	1:01.34	
69	1	3	Jasmine Schofield	Dominica	1:03.43	
70	2	9	Rana Saadeldin	Sudan	1:03.64	NR
71	1	4	Siwakhile Dlamini	Eswatini	1:04.39	
72	1	2	Southada Daviau	Laos	1:04.97	
73	1	5	Lina Goyayi	Tanzania	1:05.22	
74	1	7	Amazya Eliya Ann Macrooy	Suriname	1:05.64	
75	1	1	Meher Maqbool	Pakistan	1:08.38	
76	1	8	Emiliya Khalikova	Tajikistan	1:12.91	
	2	1	Anushiya Tandukar	Nepal	Did not start	
	2	8	Angelina Smythe	Seychelles	Did not start	
	6	2	Lani Pallister	Australia	Did not start	

=== Semifinals ===
The semifinals were started on 11 December at 17:48.

Rank	Heat	Lane	Name	Nationality	Time	Notes
1	2	4	Gretchen Walsh	United States	50.49	Q, CR, AM
2	1	3	Béryl Gastaldello	France	51.56	Q
3	1	5	Kate Douglass	United States	51.67	Q
4	1	1	Daria Klepikova	Neutral Athletes B	51.68	Q, NR
5	1	4	Siobhán Haughey	Hong Kong	51.83	Q
6	2	5	Freya Anderson	Great Britain	52.07	Q
7	1	7	Katarzyna Wasick	Poland	52.28	Q
8	1	6	Milla Jansen	Australia	52.31	Q
9	1	2	Milou van Wijk	Netherlands	52.34	R
9	2	3	Daria Trofimova	Neutral Athletes B	52.34	R
11	2	1	Sara Junevik	Sweden	52.54	
12	2	2	Nina Holt	Germany	52.56	
13	2	7	Snæfríður Jórunnardóttir	Iceland	52.68	NR
14	1	8	Sofia Morini	Italy	52.79	
15	2	6	Sara Curtis	Italy	52.80	
16	2	8	Barbora Janíčková	Czech Republic	52.81	

=== Final ===
The final was held on 12 December at 17:32.

Rank	Lane	Name	Nationality	Time	Notes
1st place, gold medalist(s)	4	Gretchen Walsh	United States	50.31	CR, AM
2nd place, silver medalist(s)	5	Béryl Gastaldello	France	50.63	NR
3rd place, bronze medalist(s)	3	Kate Douglass	United States	50.73	
4	2	Siobhán Haughey	Hong Kong	51.41	
5	6	Daria Klepikova	Neutral Athletes B	51.62	NR
6	1	Katarzyna Wasick	Poland	51.99	
7	7	Freya Anderson	Great Britain	52.22	
8	8	Milla Jansen	Australia	52.36	
