= Yulia Kabanova =

- Born: June 3, 1968 (age 58)
- Occupation: Swimming Coach
- Years active: 2000–present
- Known for: Coaching Vladimir Danilenko
- Awards: Honored Coach of Russia; Medal of the Order "For Merit to the Fatherland"; Honored Worker of Physical Culture

Yulia Yurievna Kabanova (Russian: Кабанова, Юлия Юрьевна; born June 3, 1968) is a Russian adaptive swimming coach and a coach for the Russian national team. She is a Honored Coach of Russia.

== Biography ==
Yulia Kabanova was born on June 3, 1968. From an early age, she was fond of sports, later focusing on coaching in the field of adaptive swimming.

At the beginning of her professional career, she worked as a coach in Saint Petersburg. Gradually, she developed her own approach to training athletes with musculoskeletal impairments, achieving high results on the international stage.

Since the early 2010s, Kabanova has been part of the coaching staff of the Russian national swimming team for athletes with musculoskeletal impairments.

For many years, she has worked at the Sports school "Ekran" (Saint Petersburg), holding the position of senior coach of the adaptive swimming department.

== Notable trainees ==
- Vladimir Danilenko – Three-time silver medalist at the Paralympics (2021, 2024), multiple medalist at the World Championships, two-time European champion, multiple champion of Russia among athletes with musculoskeletal impairments.

== Awards and achievements ==
- Honored Coach of Russia (2021).
- Medal of the Order "For Merit to the Fatherland", II degree - For ensuring the successful preparation of athletes who achieved high sporting achievements at the 2020 Summer Olympic Games and the 2020 Paralympic Games in Tokyo, Japan.
- Honored Worker of Physical Culture.
- Medals and certificates from regional and sports organizations for contributions to the development of adaptive sports and the training of champions.
