= Kapek =

Kapek is a surname. The feminine form of the Czech surname is Kapková. Notable people with the name include:

- Antje Kapek (1976), German politician
- Antonín Kapek (1922–1990), Czech Communist politician, M.P.
- Julien Kapek (1979), French triple jumper

== See also ==
- Kapkov
