= Aleksandr Zhigalov =

Russian swimmer

Alexander Zhigalov
Personal information
- Full name: Alexander Yuryevich Zhigalov
- National team: Russia
- Born: 27 July 2001 (age 25) Novokuznetsk, Russia

Sport
- Sport: Swimming
- Club: Sports school No. 3 (Novokuznetsk)
Medal record
Men's swimming
Representing Neutral Athletes
World Championships (SC)
Gold medal – first place	2024 Budapest	4×100 m medley
Gold medal – first place	2024 Budapest	4×100 m mixed medley
Representing Russian Swimming Federation
World Championships (SC)
Bronze medal – third place	2021 Abu Dhabi	4×100 m medley

Alexander Yuryevich Zhigalov (Russian: Александр Юрьевич Жигалов; born 27 July 2001) is a Russian swimmer, specializing in breaststroke. He has been competing professionally since 2016. He is a world champion in short course swimming, as well as a world and European junior champion. His achievements include multiple titles and medals in Russian national competitions. He also holds the title of "Master of Sport of Russia, International Class" (2020).

== Biography ==
Alexander Zhigalov was born on July 27, 2001. He is a native of Novokuznetsk, Kemerovo Oblast, and trained in swimming at the local Children and Youth Sports School No. 3.

In 2016, he received the title of Master of Sports of Russia in swimming.

His first significant international success came in 2018 when he joined the Russian national team. At the European Junior Championships in Helsinki that year, he won gold medals in the 200-meter breaststroke, the men's 4 × 100 meter medley relay, and the mixed 4 × 100 meter medley relay. In 2019, at the European Junior Championships in Kazan, he continued his success, winning gold in four events: the 100-meter breaststroke, the 200-meter breaststroke, the men's 4 × 100 meter medley relay, and the mixed 4 × 100 meter medley relay, bringing his total to seven European Junior Championship titles. At the World Junior Championships in Budapest that same year, he and his teammates won gold in the men's 4 × 100 meter medley relay and silver in the mixed 4 × 100 meter medley relay, although he only participated in the preliminary heats for both relays. Later in 2019, at the Russian Short Course Swimming Championships in Kazan, he earned a silver medal in the 200-meter breaststroke, finishing behind Mikhail Dorinov of Nizhny Novgorod. He also competed at the European Short Course Swimming Championships in Glasgow, but did not place among the medalists.

In July 2020, he was awarded the honorary title of "Master of Sports of Russia, International Class" in recognition of his outstanding sporting achievements in that year. In 2021, he competed in the 50, 100, and 200-meter breaststroke events at the European Aquatics Championships in Budapest. At the 2021 Russian Short Course Swimming Championships in Saint Petersburg, he won the 100-meter breaststroke and took silver in the 200-meter event. He also participated in the World Short Course Swimming Championships in Abu Dhabi, where, as part of the Russian team, he earned a bronze medal in the men's 4 × 100 m medley relay (participating only in the preliminary heat).

At the 2022 Russian Swimming Championships in Kazan, Zhigalov won bronze in the 200-meter breaststroke. Subsequently, he failed a doping test, resulting in a two-year suspension from competition by the Disciplinary Anti-Doping Committee of the Russian Anti-Doping Agency. During this period, he worked in various non-sports-related roles and established his own swimming school to continue his training.

Zhigalov returned to competitive swimming in July 2024, winning a bronze medal in the 100-meter breaststroke at the Russian Cup in Yekaterinburg. At the 2024 Russian Short Course Swimming Championships in Saint Petersburg, he secured a silver medal in the 200-meter event, finishing second to Kirill Prigoda. Meeting the qualification standard for the World Championships in Budapest, he competed under a neutral status and became a world champion as part of the mixed 4 × 100 m medley relay team.
