= Yann Le Goff =

France swimmer

Personal information
- Born: February 9, 2003 (age 23) Quimper, France

Sport
- Sport: Swimming
Medal record
Men's swimming
Representing France
World Championships (LC)
Silver medal – second place	2025 Singapore	4×100 m medley
Bronze medal – third place	2025 Singapore	4×100 m mixed medley

Yann Le Goff (born 9 February 2003) is a French swimmer. He competed in the men's 4 × 200-metre freestyle relay event at the 2024 Summer Olympics. He also was part of the French national record setting relay teams at the 2025 World Aquatics Championships in the men's 4×100 m medley and mixed 4×100 m medley winning silver and bronze in those respective races.
