= Swimming at the 2025 World Aquatics Championships – Men's 4 × 100 metre medley relay =

Men's 4 × 100 metre medley relay at the 2025 World Aquatics Championships
- Venue: World Aquatics Championships Arena
- Location: Singapore Sports Hub, Kallang
- Dates: 3 August
- Competitors: 115 from 26 nations
- Teams: 26
- Winning time: 3:26.93

Medalists
gold medal	Miron Lifintsev; Kirill Prigoda; Andrey Minakov; Egor Kornev; Kliment Kolesnikov; Ivan Kozhakin; Ivan Giryov
silver medal	Yohann Ndoye-Brouard; Léon Marchand; Maxime Grousset; Yann Le Goff; Jérémie Delbois; Clément Secchi	France
bronze medal	Tommy Janton; Josh Matheny; Dare Rose; Jack Alexy; Campbell McKean	United States

The men's 4 × 100 metre medley relay at the 2025 World Aquatics Championships was held on 3 August 2025 at the World Aquatics Championships Arena at the Singapore Sports Hub in Kallang, Singapore.

== Background ==
The event had no clear favourite for gold. China were looking to win their first world title in this event, returning most of their Olympic-winning team. Xu Jiayu was expected to start strongly, Qin Haiyang had been the fastest breaststroker in 2025, and Pan Zhanle was regarded as the best anchor in the field. The Neutral Athletes B team, which consists entirely of athletes from Russia, had set a national record of 3:28.49 earlier in the year, with Kliment Kolesnikov, Kirill Prigoda, Andrei Minakov and Egor Kornev forming the team. The United States had a weak backstroke leg but also held the fastest combined times of 2025. France, led by Yoann Ndoye-Brouard, Léon Marchand and Maxime Grousset, and Italy, led by Thomas Ceccon and Nicolò Martinenghi, were also in contention for medals.

== Qualification ==
Each National Federation could enter one team in the relay. The team had to be composed of swimmers who were also competing in the individual events, along with relay only swimmers who had to have met a specific qualifying time for the corresponding stroke and distance they would be swimming in the relay. Federations were only allowed to enter two relay-only swimmers for each relay they entered, though they could also enter relay-only swimmers from other relays which did not count toward this limitation.

== Records ==
Prior to the competition, the existing world and championship records were as follows.

World record	United States	3:26.78	Tokyo, Japan	1 August 2021
Competition record	United States	3:27.20	Fukuoka, Japan	30 July 2023

The following new records were set during this competition.

Date	Event	Nation	Time	Record
3 August	Final	Neutral Athletes B	3:26.93	CR

== Heats ==
Heats took place at 10:49.

Rank	Heat	Lane	Nation	Swimmers	Time	Notes
1	2	4	United States	Tommy Janton (53.21); Campbell McKean (59.32); Dare Rose (50.39); Jack Alexy (46.73)	3:29.65	Q
2	1	9	Neutral Athletes B	Kliment Kolesnikov (53.02); Ivan Kozhakin (58.72); Andrey Minakov (50.68); Ivan Giryov (47.63)	3:30.05	Q
3	3	2	Italy	Christian Bacico (53.34); Ludovico Viberti (58.65); Federico Burdisso (50.69); Manuel Frigo (47.72)	3:30.40	Q
4	3	3	Canada	Blake Tierney (52.95); Oliver Dawson (1:00.18); Ilya Kharun (49.98); Ruslan Gaziev (47.75)	3:30.86	Q, NR
5	2	3	Netherlands	Kai van Westering (53.89); Caspar Corbeau (58.60); Nyls Korstanje (51.11); Sean Niewold (47.47)	3:31.07	Q, NR
6	2	5	Great Britain	Oliver Morgan (52.90); Gregory Butler (1:00.09); Edward Mildred (51.05); Matthew Richards (47.71)	3:31.75	Q
7	3	5	France	Yohann Ndoye-Brouard (53.41); Jérémie Delbois (1:00.92); Clément Secchi (50.91); Maxime Grousset (47.11)	3:32.35	Q
8	2	1	South Korea	Lee Ju-ho (53.60); Choi Dong-yeol (59.58); Kim Young-beom (51.12); Hwang Sun-woo (48.24)	3:32.54	Q
9	3	4	China	Wang Shun (53.96); Qin Haiyang (59.58); Xu Fang (51.39); Pan Zhanle (47.76)	3:32.69	
10	3	7	Poland	Ksawery Masiuk (53.78); Dawid Wiekiera (59.84); Jakub Majerski (51.46); Kamil Sieradzki (47.75)	3:32.83	
11	3	6	Australia	Joshua Edwards-Smith (54.35); Nash Wilkes (59.95); Matthew Temple (50.22); Kyle Chalmers (48.35)	3:32.87	
12	2	2	Austria	Bernhard Reitshammer (54.67); Luka Mladenovic (59.08); Simon Bucher (51.13); Heiko Gigler (48.03)	3:32.91	
13	3	8	Japan	Riku Matsuyama (54.62); Taku Taniguchi (59.95); Naoki Mizunuma (51.61); Katsuhiro Matsumoto (48.18)	3:34.36	
14	3	9	Israel	Inbar Danziger (54.46); Gur Itzhaki (1:01.43); Gal Cohen Groumi (50.78); Daniel Krichevsky (48.24)	3:34.91	NR
15	1	8	Mexico	Marcus Reyes-Gentry (54.04 NR); Miguel de Lara (1:01.33); Jorge Iga (52.85); Andrés Dupont (47.59)	3:35.81	NR
16	3	0	Spain	Adrián Santos (54.96); Carles Coll (1:00.51); Arbidel González (52.61); Luca Hoek (48.06)	3:36.14	
17	1	4	Greece	Evangelos Makrygiannis (53.44); Savvas Thomoglou (1:00.74); Konstantinos Stamou (53.39); Stergios Bilas (48.63)	3:36.20	
18	2	9	Croatia	Luka Čarapović (55.54); Filip Mujan (1:00.83); Vili Sivec (52.35); Jere Hribar (47.67)	3:36.39	
19	1	6	Lithuania	Mantas Kaušpėdas (55.29); Andrius Šidlauskas (1:00.10); Tajus Juska (53.15); Tomas Lukminas (47.92)	3:36.46	
20	2	8	Denmark	Robert Pedersen (54.77); Jonas Gaur (1:01.63); Casper Puggaard (51.52); Frederik Lentz (48.81)	3:36.73	
21	3	1	Ireland	John Shortt (54.88); Eoin Corby (1:01.09); Jack Cassin (52.47); Evan Bailey (49.02)	3:37.46	
22	1	5	Luxembourg	Remi Fabiani (55.91); João Carneiro (1:01.63); Julien Henx (54.57); Ralph Daleiden Ciuferri (48.88)	3:40.99	NR
23	1	1	Singapore	Zackery Tay (57.32); Chan Chun Ho (1:01.20); Jonathan Tan (53.64); Mikkel Lee (49.01)	3:41.17	
24	1	2	Hong Kong	Kwan Hayden (56.77); Adam Mak Sai Ting (1:00.77); Ian Ho (52.14); Tsui Yik Ki (55.95)	3:45.63	
25	1	7	Malaysia	Khiew Hoe Yean (56.86); Andrew Goh (1:03.09); Tan Khai Xin (56.75); Singh Chahal Arvin Shaun (50.10)	3:46.80	
	2	6	Germany	Lukas Märtens (54.76); Lucas Matzerath (59.98); Luca Armbruster; Josha Salchow	Disqualified	
	1	0	Kenya		Did not start	
	1	3	Norway	Markus Lie; Jørgen Scheie Bråthen; Sander Sorensen; Bjoernar Laskerud	Did not start	
	2	0	Switzerland		Did not start	
	2	7	Ukraine	Oleksandr Zheltyakov; Volodymyr Lisovets; Denys Kesil; Vladyslav Bukhov	Did not start	

== Final ==
The final took place at 20:33.

Rank	Lane	Nation	Swimmers	Time	Notes
1st place, gold medalist(s)	5	Neutral Athletes B	Miron Lifintsev (52.44); Kirill Prigoda (57.92); Andrey Minakov (50.17); Egor Kornev (46.40)	3:26.93	CR, ER
2nd place, silver medalist(s)	1	France	Yohann Ndoye-Brouard (52.26); Léon Marchand (58.44); Maxime Grousset (49.27); Yann Le Goff (47.99)	3:27.96	NR
3rd place, bronze medalist(s)	4	United States	Tommy Janton (53.37); Josh Matheny (59.00); Dare Rose (50.30); Jack Alexy (45.95)	3:28.62	
4	3	Italy	Thomas Ceccon (51.80); Nicolò Martinenghi (58.42); Federico Burdisso (51.17); Carlos D'Ambrosio (47.33)	3:28.72	
5	6	Canada	Blake Tierney (53.03); Oliver Dawson (59.99); Ilya Kharun (49.83); Josh Liendo (46.90)	3:29.75	NR
6	7	Great Britain	Oliver Morgan (52.74); Gregory Butler (59.11); Edward Mildred (51.08); Duncan Scott (47.70)	3:30.63	
7	8	South Korea	Lee Ju-ho (53.83); Choi Dong-yeol (59.57); Kim Young-beom (51.15); Hwang Sun-woo (47.77)	3:32.32	
8	2	Netherlands	Kai van Westering (53.96); Caspar Corbeau (58.69); Nyls Korstanje (51.36); Sean Niewold (48.34)	3:32.35	
