= Nika Godun =

Russian swimmer (born 1997)

Personal information
- National team: Russia
- Born: 4 March 1997 (age 29) Moscow, Russia

Sport
- Sport: Swimming
- Strokes: Breaststroke, individual medley
Medal record
Women's swimming
Representing Russia
Event	1st	2nd	3rd
European Championships (SC)	1	0	2
Total	1	0	2
European Championships (SC)
Gold medal – first place	2021 Kazan	4×50 m medley
Bronze medal – third place	2019 Glasgow	4×50 m medley
Bronze medal – third place	2021 Kazan	50 m breaststroke
Swimming World Cup
Gold medal – first place	2021 Budapest	50 m breaststroke
Gold medal – first place	2021 Budapest	100 m breaststroke
Gold medal – first place	2021 Kazan	50 m breaststroke
Bronze medal – third place	2021 Budapest	100 m individual medley
European Junior Championships
Gold medal – first place	2012 Antwerp	4×100 m medley

Nika Godun (born 4 March 1997) is a Russian competitive swimmer. She is a Russian record holder in the short course 4×50 metre medley relay and the 4×100 metre medley relay. She competed at the 2019 and 2021 European Short Course Championships, medaling in the 4×50 metre medley relay and 50 metre breaststroke. At the 2021 World Short Course Championships she placed fifth in the 50 metre breaststroke and the 4×100 metre medley relay, and sixth in the 100 metre breaststroke and the 4×50 metre medley relay.

== Background ==
Godun was born 4 March 1997 in Moscow, Russia. She competes for Moscow in Russian competitions.

== Career ==
=== 2012–2016 ===
At the 2012 European Junior Swimming Championships, held in Antwerp, Belgium in July 2012, Godun won a gold medal as part of the 4×100 metre medley relay for her efforts swimming the breaststroke leg of the relay in the prelims heats.

In September 2016, at the 2016 Swimming World Cup stop in Moscow, Godun started competition on the first of two days with the prelims heats of the 100 metre breaststroke, where she placed 11th overall with a time of 1:11.05. Later the same morning, she placed 11th in the 50 metre backstroke with a time of 28.99 seconds in the prelims heats. In the evening, Godun swam the butterfly leg of the 4×50 metre medley relay to help achieve a fifth-place finish in 1:45.77, splitting a 27.62. The following day, she swam a 32.27 in the prelims heats of the 50 metre breaststroke to place 11th overall.

=== 2019 ===
For the 2019 World University Games in Naples, Italy at Piscina Felice Scandone in July, Godun placed 13th in the 100 metre breaststroke with a time of 1:08.90 in the semifinals. She also placed tenth with a time of 31.60 seconds in the semifinals of the 50 metre breaststroke.

==== 2019 European Short Course Championships ====
2019 European Championships (SC)
Bronze medal – third place	4×50 m medley	1:44.96 (NR)

On the first day of competition at the 2019 European Short Course Swimming Championships in Glasgow, Scotland in December 2019, Godun tied Mona McSharry of Ireland for ninth rank in the prelims heats of the 50 metre breaststroke with a time of 30.51 seconds. For the semifinals in the afternoon of the same day, Godun swam a 30.57 and tied Tatiana Chișca of Moldova for 12th-place overall. Day three of competition, Godun ranked fourth in the prelims heats of the 100 metre breaststroke with a 1:05.41 and qualified for the semifinals later in the day. In the semifinals, she qualified for the final with a time of 1:05.20 that ranked her fifth overall in the semifinals. The following day, Godun placed seventh in the final of the 100 metre breaststroke with a time of 1:05.40. On the fifth and final day of competition, Godun helped advance the 4×50 metre medley relay to the final ranking first in the prelims heats with a 1:45.81, splitting a 30.26 for the breaststroke leg of the relay. In the evening final, she split a 30.11 for the breaststroke leg and contributed to the final relay time of 1:44.96 to win the bronze medal and set a new Russian record in the event.

=== 2021 ===
==== 2021 Swimming World Cup ====
At the second stop of the 2021 Swimming World Cup, held at Danube Arena in Budapest, Hungary in October, Godun won a bronze medal in the 100 metre individual medley with a personal best time of 59.71 seconds on the first day of competition, which was less than one-tenth of a second slower than silver medalist Michelle Coleman of Sweden. The second day of competition, Godun won the gold medal in the 100 metre breaststroke with a 1:04.71 and finished over six-tenths of a second ahead of the silver medalist in the event, Lydia Jacoby of the United States. On the third and final day of competition at the Budapest stop, she won the gold medal in the 50 metre breaststroke in 29.81 seconds, this time finishing 0.16 seconds ahead of second-place finisher Lydia Jacoby. Godun returned to the World Cup circuit at the fourth and final stop, held at the Palace of Water Sports in Kazan, where she competed in the 50 metre breaststroke and won the gold medal with a time of 29.64 seconds to finish 0.01 seconds ahead of the silver medalist and fellow Russian Yuliya Yefimova.

==== 2021 European Short Course Championships ====
2021 European Championships (SC)
Gold medal – first place	4×50 m medley	1:44.19 (NR)
Bronze medal – third place	50 m breaststroke	29.80

In November 2021, at the 2021 European Short Course Swimming Championships in Kazan, Godun placed fourth in her first event, the 100 metre breaststroke, with a time of 1:04.67 that was less than half a second slower than bronze medalist in the event, Eneli Jefimova of Estonia. For her second event of the Championships, the 200 metre breaststroke, Godun placed tenth in the prelims heats with a 2:23.17 and did not advance to the semifinals stage of competition as she was not one of the two fastest Russians in the event. The same day as the 200 metre breaststroke, Godun split a 29.47 for the breaststroke leg of the 4×50 metre medley relay, contributing to the final time of 1:44.19, which won the relay team the gold medal and set a new Russian record. In her final event of the Championships, the 50 metre breaststroke, she won the bronze medal with a time of 29.80 seconds, finishing less than two-tenths of a second behind the gold and silver medalists in the event, Arianna Castiglioni and Benedetta Pilato, both of Italy.

==== 2021 World Short Course Championships ====
Leading up to the 2021 World Short Course Championships, Godun swam a personal best time of 1:03.77 in the 100 metre breaststroke at the 2021 Russian Short Course Championships and became the second-fastest female Russian swimmer in the event behind Yuliya Yefimova. The Court of Arbitration for Sport enacted a reactionary ban against Russians starting 17 December 2020 and ending 16 December 2022, after allegations that Russians all across the country were doping, which required her and all other Russians going to the World Championships to compete under a name different than their country name, Russian Swimming Federation in this case, and without their national anthem and flag.

At the World Championships, held at Etihad Arena in Abu Dhabi, United Arab Emirates in December, Godun ranked first in the semifinals of the 50 metre breaststroke, following the disqualification of Alia Atkinson of Jamaica, with a personal best time of 29.42 seconds. In the final the following day, she placed fifth with a time of 29.79 seconds. Earlier in the same finals session, she helped the 4×50 metre medley relay place sixth in 1:44.51, splitting a 29.56 for the breaststroke leg of the relay. In the final of the 100 metre breaststroke three days later, she placed sixth in 1:04.43. For her final event of the Championships, the 4×100 metre medley relay, she split a 1:04.53 for the breaststroke leg of the finals relay, which was the third-fastest breaststroke leg in the final only behind Sophie Hansson of Sweden and Qianting Tang of China, and helped achieve a new Russian record time of 3:49.94 and a fifth-place finish.

=== 2022: Double ban for being Russian ===
In 2022, the development of her senior international career was stunted first by LEN, the European governing body for aquatic sport, which banned her and all other Russians and Belarusians from their competitions indefinitely, at least for the foreseeable future, effective immediately on 3 March. Then on 21 April, she was denied the opportunity to improve upon her placings and times from the 2021 World Short Course Championships when she and all Russians and Belarusians were banned from FINA competitions by FINA through 31 December, which included the 2022 World Aquatics Championships and the 2022 World Short Course Championships. Her times achieved between 21 April and 31 December 2022 at various non-FINA competitions did not count for FINA world rankings or world records, same as the times achieved by her fellow Russians.

Developing her competition experience nationally instead, Godun won the gold medal in the 100 metre breaststroke at the 2022 Russian Championships in April with a personal best time of 1:06.66. She also competed at the long course metres swimming portion of the 2022 Russian Solidarity Games in July, a multi-sport and multi-country competition broken into two parts, winning the silver medal in the 100 metre breaststroke with a 1:06.81. At the second part of the Games, held in November in Kazan, she achieved a personal best time of 58.68 seconds in the final of the 100 metre individual medley and won the gold medal. In the 100 metre breaststroke, she won the silver medal with a personal best time of 1:03.71. For the final of the 200 metre breaststroke, she lowered her personal best time to a 2:19.94 and won the bronze medal, finishing 5.24 seconds behind the gold medalist.

=== 2023 ===
2023 Russian Championships (LC)
Bronze medal – third place	4×100 m medley	4:04.73

In April 2023, Godun was announced as having entered to compete at the year's Russian National Championships, starting 16 April in Kazan. On the first day, she ranked sixth in the semifinals of the 50 metre breaststroke with a time of 31.49 seconds and qualified for the final the next day. She placed sixth in the final on day two with a time of 31.36 seconds. Twelve days earlier, and before the start of the Championships, World Aquatics announced it was retaining its ban on Russians and Belarusians as still in effect for its competitions indefinitely. For the 100 metre breaststroke preliminaries on day three of the Championships, she swam a 1:09.60 and qualified for the semifinals ranking seventh. In the evening, she ranked fifth in the semifinals and qualified for the final with a 1:08.61. In the final of the 100 metre breaststroke on day four, she placed fourth in 1:07.67, which was 2.75 seconds behind gold medalist Evgeniia Chikunova and 0.78 seconds behind bronze medalist Alina Zmushka of Belarus.

The sixth and final day, Godun started with a 2:33.88 in the preliminaries of the 200 metre breaststroke, qualifying for the evening final ranking seventh. In the final, she placed fourth with a 2:28.93. For her final event of the Championships, the 4×100 metre medley relay, she helped the Moscow relay team win the bronze medal in 4:04.73, swimming the breaststroke leg of the relay in 1:07.77.

== International championships ==
Meet	50 breaststroke	100 breaststroke	200 breaststroke	4×50 medley relay	4×100 medley relay
EJC 2012	14th	11th	5th	—N/a	(gold) ^{[a]}
ESC 2019	12th	7th		3rd place, bronze medalist(s)	—N/a
ESC 2021	3rd place, bronze medalist(s)	4th	10th (heats)	1st place, gold medalist(s)	—N/a
SCW 2021	5th	6th		6th	5th

^{a} Godun swam only in the prelims heats.

== Personal best times ==
=== Long course metres (50 m pool) ===
Event	Time	Meet	Location	Date	Ref
50 m breaststroke	30.56	2020 Russian Championships	Kazan	3 April 2021	
100 m breaststroke	1:06.66	2022 Russian Championships	Kazan	27 April 2022	
200 m breaststroke	2:25.67	2020 Russian Championships	Kazan	8 April 2021	

=== Short course metres (25 m pool) ===
Event	Time		Meet	Location	Date	Ref
50 m breaststroke	29.42	sf	2021 World Swimming Championships	Abu Dhabi, United Arab Emirates	16 December 2021	
100 m breaststroke	1:03.71		2022 Solidarity Games	Kazan	24 November 2022	
200 m breaststroke	2:19.94		2022 Solidarity Games	Kazan	25 November 2022	
100 m individual medley	58.68		2022 Solidarity Games	Kazan	23 November 2022	

Legend: sf – semifinal

== National records ==
=== Short course metres (25 m pool) ===
No.	Event	Time	Meet	Location	Date	Status	Ref
1	4×50 m medley	1:44.96	2019 European Short Course Championships	Glasgow, Scotland	8 December 2019	Former	
2	4×50 m medley (2)	1:44.19	2021 European Short Course Championships	Kazan	4 November 2021	Current	
3	4×100 m medley	3:49.94	2021 World Short Course Championships	Abu Dhabi, United Arab Emirates	21 December 2021	Current	

== See also ==
- List of European Short Course Swimming Championships medalists (women)
