= Clément Secchi =

French Olympic Swimmer

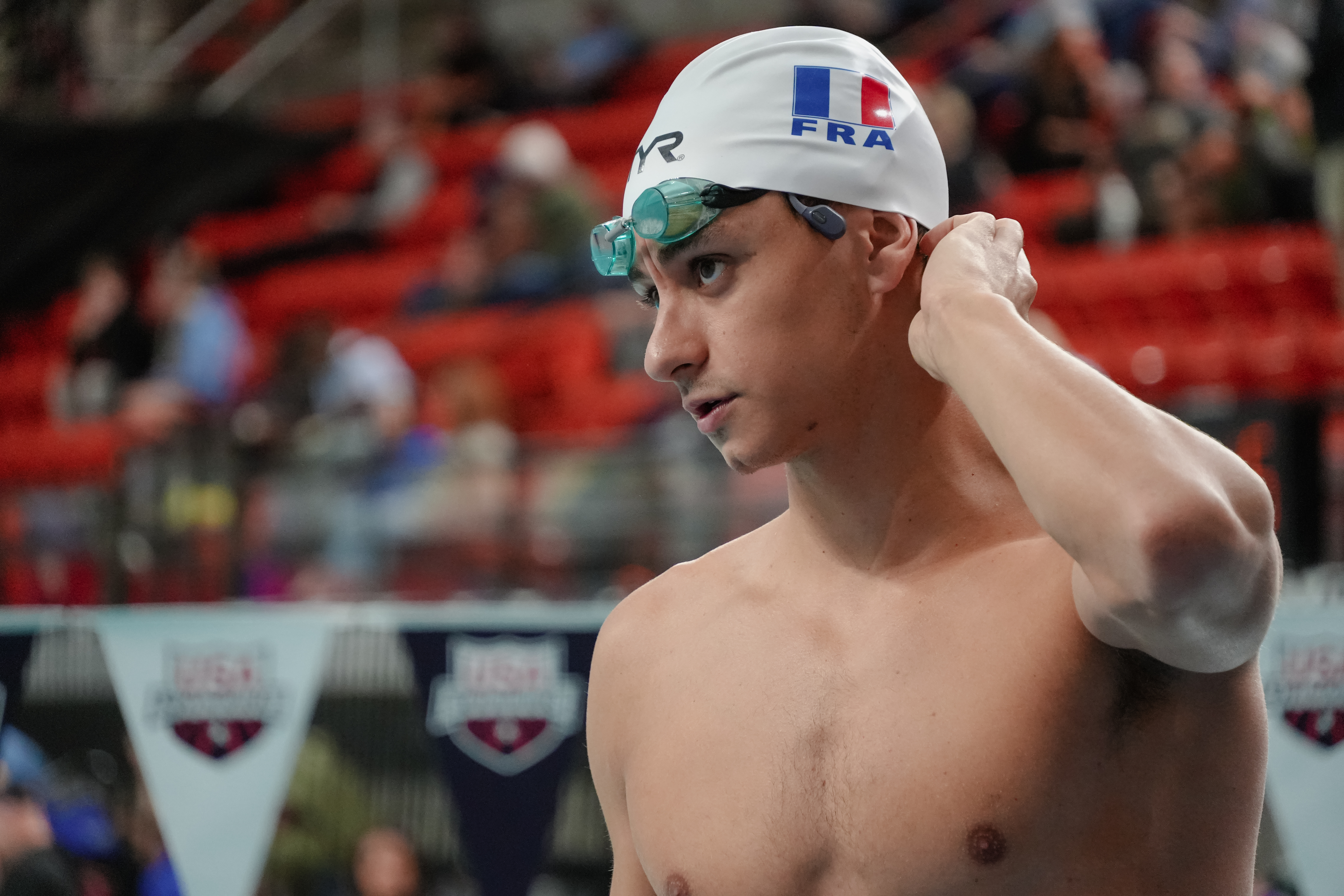
- Portrait of Clement SECCHI at TYR Pro Swim Series in Austin with the French National Team, January 2026

Personal information
- Full name: Clément Secchi
- National team: France
- Born: 4 May 2000 (age 26) Aix-en-Provence, France

Sport
- Sport: Swimming
- Strokes: Butterfly
- Club: Cercle des Nageurs Marseille
- College team: University of Missouri / McGill University
Medal record
Men's swimming
Representing France
Olympic Games
Bronze medal – third place	2024 Paris	4×100 m medley
World Championships (LC)
Silver medal – second place	2025 Singapore	4×100 m medley
European Championships (SC)
Silver medal – second place	2025 Lublin	4×50 m medley
European Championships (LC)
Silver medal – second place	2022 Rome	4×100 m medley
European Championships (SC)
Silver medal – second place	2025 Lublin	4×50 m medley

Clément Secchi (born 4 May 2000) is a French competitive swimmer specialising in butterfly events. He represents France internationally and competes for Cercle des Nageurs de Marseille. He won an Olympic bronze medal in the men's 4 × 100 metre medley relay at the 2024 Summer Olympics in Paris, and a silver medal in the same event at the 2025 World Aquatics Championships in Singapore. He has won five French national titles and a total of 18 individual medals at the French Championships in long-course and short-course events.

== Career ==
=== University career ===
Secchi competed for McGill University in Montreal, Canada, where he became one of the leading swimmers in Canadian university swimming. He was a seven-time U Sports national champion, a 15-time RSEQ conference champion, and held U Sports records in the 50 m and 100 m butterfly."Clement Secchi - Swimming & Diving". University of Missouri Athletics.

At McGill, he was named the university's male athlete of the year three seasons in a row and was also voted rookie of the year in his first season. In 2022, he was named U Sports male swimmer of the year, becoming the first McGill swimmer to receive the award."Clément Secchi termine sa carrière avec le titre de nageur de l'année au Canada". Bulletin sportif (in French). 28 March 2022.

He later joined the University of Missouri, competing in NCAA Division I swimming. At the 2023 SEC Championships, he won the 200-yard butterfly in 1:41.07.

=== Club and international career ===
Secchi joined Cercle des Nageurs de Marseille in 2020 after more than a decade with Pays d'Aix Natation. He won his first French national medal at the 2020 French Championships in Saint-Raphaël, taking silver in the 200 m butterfly."SECCHI Clement (2000)". Fédération française de natation (in French).

In 2022, he won the French national title in the 100 m butterfly at the French Championships in Limoges, which contributed to his selection for France at the 2022 World Aquatics Championships and the 2022 European Aquatics Championships."Clément Secchi - natation". L'Équipe (in French). At the European Championships in Rome, he won silver with France in the men's 4 × 100 m medley relay.

At the 2024 Summer Olympics in Paris, Secchi reached the semifinals of the men's 100 m butterfly and placed 14th overall. He also swam the butterfly leg for France in the heats of the men's 4 × 100 m medley relay, helping the team qualify with the fastest overall time of 3:31.36. France later won bronze in the final, with Secchi receiving a medal as a heat swimmer."Secchi Earns Bronze Medal at Paris 2024 Olympic Games". University of Missouri Athletics. 4 August 2024.

In 2025, at the French Championships in Montpellier, he won the national title in the 200 m butterfly and also took silver in the 100 m butterfly and bronze in the 50 m butterfly."Championnats de France 2025 : un beau bilan pour le CN Marseille". Cercle des Nageurs de Marseille (in French). 20 June 2025. Later that year, at the World Championships in Singapore, he swam in the heats of the men's 4 × 100 m medley relay. France won the silver medal in the final and set a French record of 3:27.96; the swimmers who competed in the heats, including Secchi, were also awarded medals."Championnats du monde de Singapour : le relais 4x100 m 4 nages vice-champion du monde avec un nouveau record de France". Fédération française de natation (in French). 3 August 2025.

According to L'Équipe, Secchi has won five French national titles.

== Other activities ==
After studying and swimming in Canada and the United States, Secchi co-founded BS Athletics, an agency supporting French swimmers seeking to study and compete at universities in the United States."« On n'est pas juste là pour nager » : dans le sillage de Léon Marchand, des jeunes Français s'exilent aux Etats-Unis". Le Monde (in French). 28 July 2025. The company is registered in Marseille as a simplified joint-stock company, with Secchi listed as managing director since July 2025."Clement Secchi : BS ATHLETICS". Pappers (in French).

== Honours ==
Knight of the National Order of Merit (2024)."Décret du 23 septembre 2024 portant promotion et nomination dans l'ordre national du Mérite". Légifrance (in French). 23 September 2024.

== Results ==
=== International competitions ===
Secchi competed at the 2024 Summer Olympics in Paris. In the men's 100 metre butterfly, he reached the semifinals and finished 14th overall. He also swam the butterfly leg for France in the heats of the men's 4 × 100 metre medley relay; France later won the bronze medal in the final, with Secchi receiving a medal as a heat swimmer.

At the 2025 World Aquatics Championships in Singapore, Secchi reached the semifinals of the men's 100 metre butterfly, finishing 13th overall. He also swam in the heats of the men's 4 × 100 metre medley relay; France won the silver medal in the final and set a French record of 3:27.96.

At the 2022 European Aquatics Championships in Rome, Secchi won a silver medal with France in the men's 4 × 100 metre medley relay. He also competed individually in the 50 metre butterfly and 100 metre butterfly, reaching the semifinals of the 100 metre butterfly.

At the 2024 World Aquatics Swimming Championships (25 m) in Budapest, Secchi competed in the 100 metre butterfly, 200 metre butterfly and men's 4 × 100 metre medley relay. He reached the semifinals of the 100 metre butterfly and finished seventh with France in the relay.

At the 2025 European Short Course Swimming Championships in Lublin, Secchi finished eighth in the 100 metre butterfly and won a silver medal with France in the men's 4 × 50 metre medley relay, which set a French record of 1:30.99.

=== French Championships ===
Secchi has won five individual French national titles and a total of 18 individual medals at the French Championships in long-course and short-course events: five gold, eleven silver and two bronze medals.

His individual medal record at the French Championships is:

- Long course: two gold medals, six silver medals and two bronze medals.
- Short course: three gold medals and five silver medals.
- Overall: five gold medals, eleven silver medals and two bronze medals.

=== Personal bests ===
Secchi's main personal bests in butterfly events are:

- 50 metre butterfly: 23.31 in long course and 22.39 in short course.
- 100 metre butterfly: 51.06 in long course and 49.96 in short course.
- 200 metre butterfly: 1:58.06 in long course and 1:52.31 in short course.
