= Kapkov =

Kapkov (feminine: Kapkova) is a Slavic surname.

- Lidia Kapkova, Russian swimming coach
- Sergey Kapkov (journalist), Russian journalist
- Sergey Kapkov (politician), Russian politician
- Yakov Kapkov (1816-1854), Russian painter
