= Swimming at the 2026 European Aquatics Championships – Men's 4 × 100 metre freestyle relay =

Men's 4 × 100 metre freestyle relay at the 2026 European Aquatics Championships
- Venue: Paris Aquatic Centre
- Dates: 13 August
- Competitors: 84 from 19 nations
- Teams: 19
- Winning time: 3:10.03 CR

Medalists
| gold medal | Hubert Kós; Szebasztián Szabó; Nándor Németh; Kristóf Milák; Olivér Kós; Ádám Jászó | Hungary |
| silver medal | Ivan Giryov; Vasilii Kukushkin; Aleksandr Shchegolev; Egor Kornev; Mikhail Shcherbakov; Roman Zhidkov; Andrey Minakov |
| bronze medal | Jere Hribar; Vlaho Nenadić; Vili Sivec; Toni Dragoja | Croatia |

The Men's 4 × 100 metre freestyle relay competition of the 2026 European Aquatics Championships was held on 13 August 2026.

== Records ==
Before the competition, the existing world, European and championship records were as follows.

| | Team | Time | Location | Date |
|---|---|---|---|---|
| World record | United States | 3:08.24 | Beijing | 11 August 2008 |
| European record | France | 3:08.32 | Beijing | 11 August 2008 |
| Championship record | Russia | 3:10.41 | Budapest | 17 May 2021 |

== Results ==
=== Heats ===
The heats were held at 10:54.

| Rank | Heat | Time | Nation | Swimmers | Time | Notes |
|---|---|---|---|---|---|---|
| 1 | 2 | 3 | Neutral Athletes B | Mikhail Shcherbakov (49.16); Roman Zhidkov (47.92); Vasilii Kukushkin (47.21); Andrey Minakov (47.92) | 3:12.21 | Q |
| 2 | 2 | 1 | Great Britain | Gabriel Shepherd (48.40); Duncan Scott (47.82); Alexander Cohoon (48.18); Jacob Mills (48.40) | 3:12.80 | Q |
| 3 | 2 | 0 | Croatia | Vlaho Nenadić (48.50); Jere Hribar (47.97); Vili Sivec (48.32); Toni Dragoja (48.27) | 3:13.06 | Q |
| 4 | 2 | 7 | Spain | Sergio de Celis (49.29); Luca Hoek (47.37); Miguel Pérez-Godoy (48.41); César Castro (48.41) | 3:13.48 | Q |
| 5 | 1 | 5 | Hungary | Nándor Németh (47.83); Szebasztián Szabó (48.14); Olivér Kós (49.34); Ádám Jászó (48.86) | 3:14.17 | Q |
| 6 | 2 | 8 | Netherlands | Brandon van den Berg (49.11); Merlin Belmon (48.75); Floris Tanis (49.46); Sean Niewold (47.60) | 3:14.92 | Q |
| 7 | 2 | 2 | Norway | Sander Kiær Sørensen (49.60); Elias Nordeng Refstie (48.38); Jakob Austevoll Harlem (48.25); Bjørnar Grytnes Laskerud (49.00) | 3:15.23 | Q, NR |
| 8 | 1 | 9 | Germany | Josha Salchow (48.50); Cornelius Jahn (49.19); Julian Koch (48.93); Ole Mats Eidam (48.73) | 3:15.35 | Q |
| 9 | 2 | 6 | Serbia | Velimir Stjepanović (49.62); Justin Cvetkov (49.30); Petar Popović (49.15); Nikola Aćin (47.34) | 3:15.41 | |
| 10 | 1 | 7 | Israel | Alexey Glivinskiy (49.06); Denis Loktev (48.93); Daniel Krichevsky (48.82); Martin Kartavi (48.64) | 3:15.45 | |
| 11 | 1 | 0 | Italy | Manuel Frigo (49.38); Alessandro Miressi (49.13); Lorenzo Ballarati (48.64); Leonardo Deplano (48.44) | 3:15.59 | |
| 12 | 1 | 1 | Sweden | Ludvig Bartolek (49.39); Robin Hanson (48.59); Elias Persson (48.93); Charlie Skoglund Macmillan (48.87) | 3:15.78 | |
| 13 | 2 | 5 | Austria | Lukas Edl (49.52); Viktor Kopf (49.40); Christian Giefing (48.29); Heiko Gigler (48.62) | 3:15.83 | NR |
| 14 | 1 | 8 | Poland | Mateusz Chowaniec (48.96); Jakub Majerski (48.98); Michał Chmielewski (50.31); Ksawery Masiuk (48.92) | 3:17.17 | |
| 15 | 2 | 9 | Luxembourg | Ralph Daleiden Ciuferri (48.55); Rémi Fabiani (48.37); Finn Kemp (50.64); Florian Frippiat (49.76) | 3:17.32 | |
| 16 | 1 | 2 | Estonia | Lars Kuljus (49.95); Alex Ahtiainen (49.64); Oliver Kuulpak (50.16); Siim Kesküla (50.33) | 3:20.08 | |
| 17 | 1 | 4 | Latvia | Nikolass Deičmans (51.20); Valērijs Čurgelis (50.83); Emīls Krampe (51.22); Jānis Deivs Dzirkalis (49.40) | 3:22.65 | |
| 18 | 2 | 4 | Faroe Islands | Líggjas Joensen (52.03); Ísak Dag Brisenfeldt (51.23); Heini Mohr Askam (52.72); Silas Dam Lindberg (53.41) | 3:29.39 | |
| | 1 | 6 | Switzerland | Balint Ashton; Mattia Mauri; Tiago Behar; Robin Yeboah | Disqualified | |
| | 1 | 3 | Lithuania | Danas Rapšys; Tomas Navikonis; Tajus Juška; Kristupas Trepočka | Did not start | |

=== Final ===
The final was held at 19:43.

| Rank | Lane | Nation | Swimmers | Time | Notes |
|---|---|---|---|---|---|
| 1st place, gold medalist(s) | 2 | Hungary | Hubert Kós (48.18); Szebasztián Szabó (48.29); Nándor Németh (47.27); Kristóf Milák (46.29) | 3:10.03 | CR |
| 2nd place, silver medalist(s) | 4 | Neutral Athletes B | Ivan Giryov (48.14); Vasilii Kukushkin (47.77); Aleksandr Shchegolev (47.89); Egor Kornev (46.32) | 3:10.12 | |
| 3rd place, bronze medalist(s) | 3 | Croatia | Jere Hribar (47.77); Vlaho Nenadić (47.96); Vili Sivec (48.24); Toni Dragoja (47.11) | 3:11.08 | NR |
| 4 | 6 | Spain | Luca Hoek (47.47); César Castro (48.22); Miguel Pérez-Godoy (48.12); Sergio de Celis (48.10) | 3:11.91 | NR |
| 5 | 5 | Great Britain | Matthew Richards (47.89); Duncan Scott (47.65); Gabriel Shepherd (48.19); Thomas Dean (48.19) | 3:11.92 | |
| 6 | 8 | Germany | Josha Salchow (48.62); Kaii Winkler (47.88); Julian Koch (47.98); Ole Mats Eidam (48.72) | 3:13.20 | |
| 7 | 1 | Norway | Sander Kiær Sørensen (49.07); Elias Nordeng Refstie (48.11); Jakob Austevoll Harlem (48.31); Bjørnar Grytnes Laskerud (48.96) | 3:14.45 | NR |
| 8 | 7 | Netherlands | Brandon van den Berg (49.25); Merlin Belmon (48.44); Floris Tanis (49.32); Sean Niewold (48.97) | 3:15.98 | |
