= Egor Kornev =

Russian swimmer (born 2004)

Personal information
- Full name: Egor Denisovich Kornev
- National team: Russia
- Born: 6 February 2004 (age 22) Saint Petersburg, Russia
- Height: 1.95 m (6 ft 5 in)

Sport
- Sport: Swimming
- Club: Sports school "Ekran"
- Coach: Olga Baydalova; Yelena Dendeberova
Medal record
Men's swimming
Representing Neutral Athletes B
World Championships (LC)
Gold medal – first place	2025 Singapore	4×100 m medley
Silver medal – second place	2025 Singapore	4×100 m mixed freestyle
World Championships (SC)
Gold medal – first place	2024 Budapest	4×100 m medley
European Championships (LC)
Gold medal – first place	2026 Paris	50 m butterfly
Gold medal – first place	2026 Paris	4×100 m medley
Gold medal – first place	2026 Paris	4×100 m mixed freestyle
Silver medal – second place	2026 Paris	50 m freestyle
Silver medal – second place	2026 Paris	100 m freestyle
Silver medal – second place	2026 Paris	4×100 m freestyle

Egor Denisovich Kornev (Russian: Егор Денисович Корнев; born 6 February 2004) is a Russian swimmer. He is a two-time world champion in the 4 × 100 m medley relay. He is a two-time short course world record holder. (Note: As of 8 November 2026.)

== Early life ==
Egor Kornev was born on 6 February 2004 in St. Petersburg. He started swimming at SSOR No. 3 in Kalininsky district of St. Petersburg with Margarita Perova and Larisa Dvorak. After graduating from primary school he moved to SSOR Ekran to Elena Kuznetsova and Olga Baidalova.

== Career ==
In December 2024, Kornev competed at the World Championships (25 m) in Budapest, representing Neutral Athletes B (NAB). He swam in the 4 × 100 m freestyle relay, splitting 45.94 on the first leg; NAB finished fourth in a time of 3:04.62. Kornev then competed in the 100 m freestyle, recording a time of 45.58 to finish fifth. His next event was the mixed 4 × 50 m freestyle relay, in which he split 20.88 on the first leg; NAB finished fourth in a time of 1:28.95. Kornev's final event was the men's 4 × 100 m medley relay, in which he split 45.42 on the freestyle leg; NAB won the gold medal in a world record time of 3:18.68, surpassing the mark of 3:18.98 set by Australia and the US in 2022.

In July–August 2025, Kornev competed at the World Championships in Singapore. He swam the 100 m freestyle, finishing fifth in a time of 47.51. He then competed in the mixed 4 × 100 m freestyle relay, splitting 47.69 on the first leg. NAB won the silver medal in a time of 3:19.68, surpassing the European record of 3:21.68 set by Great Britain in 2023. Kornev's final event was the men's 4 × 100 m medley relay, where he split 46.40 to overtake France's Yann le Goff on the freestyle leg. NAB won the gold medal in a time of 3:26.93. This was a new championship record, surpassing the US' mark of 3:27.20 from 2023. It was also a new European record, and was 0.15 slower than the US' world record from 2021.

In June 2026, Kornev competed at the Russian Championships in Kazan. He went 46.99 in the semifinals of the 100 m freestyle, breaking the Russian record of 47.11 set by Kliment Kolesnikov in 2021. The same session, he broke another national record, this time in the 50 m butterfly, achieving a time of 22.59 to surpass Oleg Kostin's mark of 22.62 from 2023. The following day, Kornev lowered his 100 m freestyle record to 46.96. He went 21.12 in the 50 m freestyle semifinals, breaking Vladimir Morozov's mark of 21.27 from 2019. Kornev set another national record in the final, recording a time of 21.06.

At the first leg of the 2026 World Cup in Baku, Egor equalled the 2021 short-course world record set by Kyle Chalmers in the 100 m freestyle.

At the second leg of the 2026 World Cup in Tashkent, Kornev set a new short-course world record in the 50 m butterfly final, improving on the previous record held by Noè Ponti by 0.04 seconds.

== Awards and honors ==
- In 2021, he received the title "Master of Sports of Russia"
- In 2022, "Master of Sports of Russia International Class"
- Won the All-Russian Swimming Federation award (2023) in the category "Discovery of the Year"
