= 2024 World Aquatics Swimming Championships (25 m) =

Swimming competition

- Host city: Budapest, Hungary
- Date: 10–15 December
- Venue: Duna Arena
- Nations: 189
- Events: 45

The 17th World Aquatics Swimming Championships (25 m) took place from 10 to 15 December 2024 in Budapest, Hungary, at the Duna Arena. Swimming events in the championships were conducted in a 25 m indoor (short course) pool.

The 4 × 50 m freestyle relay and 4 × 50 m medley relay for men and women were removed from the program, and the mixed 4 × 100 m medley relay was added, for a total of 45 medal events.

The United States topped the medal table, winning 18 gold & 39 medals in total, and broke 21 world records in the championships, were given the Best Team Award. Noe Ponti of Switzerland was named the Best Male swimmer and Gretchen Walsh of the US was named the Best Female swimmer.

Belarusian swimmers competed under the name of "Neutral Athletes A" under the World Aquatics flag, while Russian swimmers competed under the name of "Neutral Athletes B", also under the World Aquatics flag.

== Qualification ==
The qualification period for the 2024 World Swimming Championships ran from 23 July 2023 through 17 November 2024.

Below were the qualifying times as determined by World Aquatics:

Event	Men	Women	Men	Women
	"A"		"B"	
50 m freestyle	21.40	24.44	22.15	25.30
100 m freestyle	47.23	53.78	48.88	55.66
200 m freestyle	1:44.08	1:55.60	1:47.72	1:59.65
400 m freestyle	3:42.50	4:06.95	3:50.29	4:15.59
800 m freestyle	7:45.02	8:29.17	8:01.30	8:46.99
1500 m freestyle	14:49.29	16:15.27	15:20.42	16:49.40
50 m backstroke	23.38	26.54	24.20	27.47
100 m backstroke	51.30	58.08	53.10	1:00.11
200 m backstroke	1:52.66	2:05.54	1:56.60	2:09.93
50 m breaststroke	26.57	30.45	27.50	31.52
100 m breaststroke	57.63	1:05.28	59.65	1:07.56
200 m breaststroke	2:06.23	2:23.38	2:10.65	2:28.40
50 m butterfly	22.53	25.82	23.32	26.72
100 m butterfly	50.57	57.40	52.34	59.41
200 m butterfly	1:53.61	2:08.85	1:57.59	2:13.36
100 m individual medley	52.98	59.65	54.83	1:01.74
200 m individual medley	1:55.25	2:10.16	1:59.28	2:14.72
400 m individual medley	4:09.19	4:37.54	4:17.91	4:47.25

== Schedule ==
An opening ceremony will proceed the start of competition on 10 December and a closing ceremony will conclude the Championships on 15 December following competition termination.

A total of 45 events will be contested over six consecutive days.

H	Heats	SF	Semifinals	(gold)	Finals	TF	Timed Finals

M = Morning session (starting at 9:00), E = Evening session (starting at 17:30)

Men
Date →	Tue 10		Wed 11		Thu 12		Fri 13		Sat 14		Sun 15	
Event ↓	M	E	M	E	M	E	M	E	M	E	M	E
50 m freestyle									H	SF		1st place, gold medalist(s)
100 m freestyle			H	SF		1st place, gold medalist(s)						
200 m freestyle											H	1st place, gold medalist(s)
400 m freestyle					H	1st place, gold medalist(s)						
800 m freestyle									TF	TF		
1500 m freestyle	TF	TF										
50 m backstroke					H	SF		1st place, gold medalist(s)				
100 m backstroke	H	SF		1st place, gold medalist(s)								
200 m backstroke											H	1st place, gold medalist(s)
50 m breaststroke									H	SF		1st place, gold medalist(s)
100 m breaststroke			H	SF		1st place, gold medalist(s)						
200 m breaststroke							H	1st place, gold medalist(s)				
50 m butterfly	H	SF		1st place, gold medalist(s)								
100 m butterfly							H	SF		1st place, gold medalist(s)		
200 m butterfly					H	1st place, gold medalist(s)						
100 m individual medley					H	SF		1st place, gold medalist(s)				
200 m individual medley	H	1st place, gold medalist(s)										
400 m individual medley									H	1st place, gold medalist(s)		
4 × 100 m freestyle relay	H	1st place, gold medalist(s)										
4 × 200 m freestyle relay							H	1st place, gold medalist(s)				
4 × 100 m medley relay											H	1st place, gold medalist(s)

Women
Date →	Tue 10		Wed 11		Thu 12		Fri 13		Sat 14		Sun 15	
Event ↓	M	E	M	E	M	E	M	E	M	E	M	E
50 m freestyle									H	SF		1st place, gold medalist(s)
100 m freestyle			H	SF		1st place, gold medalist(s)						
200 m freestyle											H	1st place, gold medalist(s)
400 m freestyle	H	1st place, gold medalist(s)										
800 m freestyle			TF	TF								
1500 m freestyle							TF	TF				
50 m backstroke					H	SF		1st place, gold medalist(s)				
100 m backstroke	H	SF		1st place, gold medalist(s)								
200 m backstroke											H	1st place, gold medalist(s)
50 m breaststroke									H	SF		1st place, gold medalist(s)
100 m breaststroke			H	SF		1st place, gold medalist(s)						
200 m breaststroke							H	1st place, gold medalist(s)				
50 m butterfly	H	SF		1st place, gold medalist(s)								
100 m butterfly							H	SF		1st place, gold medalist(s)		
200 m butterfly					H	1st place, gold medalist(s)						
100 m individual medley					H	SF		1st place, gold medalist(s)				
200 m individual medley	H	1st place, gold medalist(s)										
400 m individual medley									H	1st place, gold medalist(s)		
4 × 100 m freestyle relay	H	1st place, gold medalist(s)										
4 × 200 m freestyle relay					H	1st place, gold medalist(s)						
4 × 100 m medley relay											H	1st place, gold medalist(s)

Mixed
Date →	Tue 10		Wed 11		Thu 12		Fri 13		Sat 14		Sun 15	
Event ↓	M	E	M	E	M	E	M	E	M	E	M	E
4 × 50 m freestyle relay							H	1st place, gold medalist(s)				
4 × 50 m medley relay			H	1st place, gold medalist(s)								
4 × 100 m medley relay									H	1st place, gold medalist(s)		

== Medal summary ==
=== Medal table ===
* Host nation (Hungary)

Rank	Nation	Gold	Silver	Bronze	Total
1	United States	18	13	8	39
2	Neutral Athletes B	6	4	0	10
3	Canada	4	5	6	15
4	China	3	1	1	5
5	Switzerland	3	0	0	3
6	Australia	2	5	5	12
7	Hungary*	2	2	0	4
8	Italy	1	5	3	9
9	Germany	1	3	0	4
10	Cayman Islands	1	0	1	2
10	Tunisia	1	0	1	2
12	Hong Kong	1	0	0	1
12	Lithuania	1	0	0	1
12	Spain	1	0	0	1
15	France	0	3	2	5
16	Brazil	0	2	1	3
17	Great Britain	0	1	2	3
18	Netherlands	0	1	1	2
18	Turkey	0	1	1	2
20	Austria	0	1	0	1
21	Poland	0	0	5	5
22	Neutral Athletes A	0	0	2	2
23	Belgium	0	0	1	1
23	Estonia	0	0	1	1
23	Ireland	0	0	1	1
23	Japan	0	0	1	1
Totals (26 entries)		45	47	43	135

== Results ==
=== Men's events ===
Event	Gold		Silver		Bronze	
50 m freestyle	Jordan Crooks; Cayman Islands	20.19	Guilherme Caribé; Brazil	20.57	Jack Alexy; United States	20.61
100 m freestyle	Jack Alexy; United States	45.38	Guilherme Caribé; Brazil	45.47; SA	Jordan Crooks; Cayman Islands	45.48
200 m freestyle	Luke Hobson; United States	1:38.61; WR	Maximillian Giuliani; Australia	1:40.36; OC	Lucas Henveaux; Belgium	1:41.13; NR
400 m freestyle	Elijah Winnington; Australia	3:35.89	Carson Foster; United States Kieran Smith; United States	3:36.31	Not awarded	
800 m freestyle	Zalán Sárkány; Hungary	7:30.56; NR	Florian Wellbrock; Germany	7:31.90	Ahmed Jaouadi; Tunisia	7:31.93; AF
1500 m freestyle	Ahmed Jaouadi; Tunisia	14:16.40	Florian Wellbrock; Germany	14:17.27	Kuzey Tunçelli; Turkey	14:20.64; WJ, NR
50 m backstroke	Miron Lifintsev; Neutral Athletes B	22.47; WJ	Isaac Cooper; Australia	22.49; OC	Shane Ryan; Ireland	22.56; NR
100 m backstroke	Miron Lifintsev; Neutral Athletes B	48.76; WJ	Hubert Kós; Hungary	48.79; NR	Kacper Stokowski; Poland	49.16; NR
200 m backstroke	Hubert Kós; Hungary	1:45.65; CR, ER	Lorenzo Mora; Italy	1:48.96	Mewen Tomac; France	1:49.93
50 m breaststroke	Qin Haiyang; China	25.42	Kirill Prigoda; Neutral Athletes B Emre Sakçı; Turkey	25.56	Not awarded	
100 m breaststroke	Qin Haiyang; China	55.47; CR, AS	Kirill Prigoda; Neutral Athletes B	55.49; NR	Ilya Shymanovich; Neutral Athletes A	55.60
200 m breaststroke	Carles Coll; Spain	2:01.55; NR	Kirill Prigoda; Neutral Athletes B	2:01.88	Yamato Fukasawa; Japan	2:02.01
50 m butterfly	Noè Ponti; Switzerland	21.32; WR	Ilya Kharun; Canada	21.67; AM	Nyls Korstanje; Netherlands	21.68
100 m butterfly	Noè Ponti; Switzerland	47.71; WR	Maxime Grousset; France	48.57; NR	Matthew Temple; Australia	48.71
200 m butterfly	Ilya Kharun; Canada	1:48.24 =CR, AM	Alberto Razzetti; Italy	1:48.64; ER	Krzysztof Chmielewski; Poland	1:49.26; NR
100 m individual medley	Noè Ponti; Switzerland	50.33; CR, NR	Bernhard Reitshammer; Austria	51.11; NR	Caio Pumputis; Brazil	51.35; SA
200 m individual medley	Shaine Casas; United States	1:49.51; CR, AM	Alberto Razzetti; Italy	1:50.88; NR	Finlay Knox; Canada	1:50.90; NR
400 m individual medley	Ilya Borodin; Neutral Athletes B	3:56.83	Carson Foster; United States	3:57.45	Alberto Razzetti; Italy	3:58.83
4 × 100 m freestyle relay	United States; Jack Alexy (45.05) CR, AM; Luke Hobson (45.18); Kieran Smith (46.01); Chris Guiliano (45.42); Trenton Julian^{[a]}	3:01.66; WR	Italy; Alessandro Miressi (45.85); Leonardo Deplano (45.76); Lorenzo Zazzeri (46.21); Manuel Frigo (45.73)	3:03.65	Poland; Kamil Sieradzki (46.33); Jakub Majerski (46.04); Ksawery Masiuk (45.64); Kacper Stokowski (46.45); Piotr Ludwiczak^{[a]}	3:04.46; NR
4 × 200 m freestyle relay	United States; Luke Hobson (1:38.91) WR; Carson Foster (1:40.77); Shaine Casas (1:40.34); Kieran Smith (1:40.49); Trenton Julian^{[a]} Daniel Matheson^{[a]}	6:40.51; WR	Australia; Maximillian Giuliani (1:40.73); Edward Sommerville (1:41.03); Harrison Turner (1:42.21); Elijah Winnington (1:41.57); David Schlicht^{[a]}	6:45.54; OC	Italy; Filippo Megli (1:42.26); Manuel Frigo (1:42.15); Carlos D'Ambrosio (1:41.48); Alberto Razzetti (1:41.62); Davide Dalla Costa^{[a]} Alessandro Ragaini^{[a]}	6:47.51; NR
4 × 100 m medley relay	Neutral Athletes B Miron Lifintsev (49.31); Kirill Prigoda (55.15); Andrey Minakov (48.80); Egor Kornev (45.42); Pavel Samusenko^{[a]} Aleksandr Zhigalov^{[a]} Dmitrii Zhavoronkov^{[a]}	3:18.68; WR	United States; Shaine Casas (48.92); Michael Andrew (57.03); Dare Rose (48.55); Jack Alexy (44.53); AJ Pouch^{[a]} Zach Harting^{[a]} Harrison Turner^{[a]}	3:19.03	Italy; Lorenzo Mora (49.53); Ludovico Viberti (56.15); Michele Busa (48.81); Alessandro Miressi (45.42); Christian Bacico^{[a]} Simone Cerasuolo^{[a]} Simone Stefanì^{[a]}	3:19.91

^{a} Swimmers who participated in the heats only and received medals.

=== Women's events ===
Event	Gold		Silver		Bronze	
50 m freestyle	Gretchen Walsh; United States	22.83; WR	Kate Douglass; United States	23.05	Katarzyna Wasick; Poland	23.37
100 m freestyle	Gretchen Walsh; United States	50.31; CR, AM	Béryl Gastaldello; France	50.63; NR	Kate Douglass; United States	50.73
200 m freestyle	Siobhán Haughey; Hong Kong	1:50.62	Mary-Sophie Harvey; Canada	1:51.49; AM	Claire Weinstein; United States	1:51.62; WJ, NR
400 m freestyle	Summer McIntosh; Canada	3:50.25; WR	Lani Pallister; Australia	3:53.73; OC	Mary-Sophie Harvey; Canada	3:54.88
800 m freestyle	Lani Pallister; Australia	8:01.95; CR, NR	Isabel Gose; Germany	8:05.42; NR	Katie Grimes; United States	8:05.90
1500 m freestyle	Isabel Gose; Germany	15:24.69	Simona Quadarella; Italy	15:30.14	Jillian Cox; United States	15:41.29
50 m backstroke	Regan Smith; United States	25.23; WR	Katharine Berkoff; United States	25.61	Kylie Masse; Canada	25.78
100 m backstroke	Regan Smith; United States	54.55; CR	Katharine Berkoff; United States	54.93	Ingrid Wilm; Canada	55.75
200 m backstroke	Regan Smith; United States	1:58.04; WR	Summer McIntosh; Canada	1:59.96; WJ, NR	Anastasiya Shkurdai; Neutral Athletes A	2:00.56
50 m breaststroke	Rūta Meilutytė; Lithuania	28.54	Tang Qianting; China	28.86	Lilly King; United States	28.91
100 m breaststroke	Tang Qianting; China	1:02.38	Lilly King; United States	1:02.80	Eneli Jefimova; Estonia	1:03.25
200 m breaststroke	Kate Douglass; United States	2:12.50; WR	Evgeniia Chikunova; Neutral Athletes B	2:15.14	Alex Walsh; United States	2:16.83
50 m butterfly	Gretchen Walsh; United States	24.01	Béryl Gastaldello; France	24.43; NR	Alexandria Perkins; Australia	24.68; OC
100 m butterfly	Gretchen Walsh; United States	52.71; WR	Tessa Giele; Netherlands	54.66; NR	Alexandria Perkins; Australia	55.10; OC
200 m butterfly	Summer McIntosh; Canada	1:59.32; WR	Regan Smith; United States	2:01.00; NR	Elizabeth Dekkers; Australia	2:02.91
100 m individual medley	Gretchen Walsh; United States	55.11; WR	Kate Douglass; United States	56.49	Béryl Gastaldello; France	56.67; NR
200 m individual medley	Kate Douglass; United States	2:01.63; WR	Alex Walsh; United States	2:02.65	Abbie Wood; Great Britain	2:02.75; NR
400 m individual medley	Summer McIntosh; Canada	4:15.48; WR	Katie Grimes; United States	4:20.14; NR	Abbie Wood; Great Britain	4:24.34
4 × 100 m freestyle relay	United States; Kate Douglass (50.95); Katharine Berkoff (51.38); Alex Shackell (52.01); Gretchen Walsh (50.67); Phoebe Bacon^{[b]} Jillian Cox^{[b]}	3:25.01; WR	Australia; Meg Harris (52.59); Milla Jansen (51.62); Alexandria Perkins (51.68); Lani Pallister (52.36); Lily Price^{[b]} Leah Neale^{[b]}	3:28.25	Canada; Mary-Sophie Harvey (52.40); Summer McIntosh (51.81); Ingrid Wilm (52.22); Penny Oleksiak (52.01); Sydney Pickrem^{[b]} Alexanne Lepage^{[b]}	3:28.44
4 × 200 m freestyle relay	United States; Alex Walsh (1:53.25); Paige Madden (1:53.18); Katie Grimes (1:53.39); Claire Weinstein (1:50.31); Phoebe Bacon^{[b]} Lilla Bognar^{[b]}	7:30.13; WR	Hungary; Nikolett Pádár (1:52.81); Panna Ugrai (1:52.59); Dóra Molnár (1:55.39); Lilla Minna Ábrahám (1:52.60)	7:33.39; NR	Australia; Leah Neale (1:52.79); Elizabeth Dekkers (1:54.96); Milla Jansen (1:54.01); Lani Pallister (1:51.84); Tara Kinder^{[b]}	7:33.60
4 × 100 m medley relay	United States; Regan Smith (54.02) WR; Lilly King (1:03.02); Gretchen Walsh (52.84); Kate Douglass (50.53); Katharine Berkoff^{[b]} Emma Weber^{[b]} Alex Shackell^{[b]} Alex Walsh^{[b]}	3:40.41; WR	Great Britain; Abbie Wood (57.44); Angharad Evans (1:03.18); Eva Okaro (56.11); Freya Anderson (51.11)	3:47.84; NR	China; Qian Xinan (56.88); Tang Qianting (1:03.17); Chen Luying (56.25); Liu Shuhan (51.63)	3:47.93

^{b} Swimmers who participated in the heats only and received medals.

=== Mixed events ===
Event	Gold		Silver		Bronze	
4 × 50 m freestyle relay	Italy; Leonardo Deplano (20.80); Alessandro Miressi (21.01); Silvia Di Pietro (23.35); Sara Curtis (23.34); Lorenzo Zazzeri^{[c]}	1:28.50	Canada; Ilya Kharun (20.80); Yuri Kisil (20.57); Ingrid Wilm (23.72); Mary-Sophie Harvey (23.51); Finlay Knox^{[c]} Penny Oleksiak^{[c]}	1:28.60	Poland; Piotr Ludwiczak (21.31); Kamil Sieradzki (20.89); Kornelia Fiedkiewicz (23.70); Katarzyna Wasick (22.90)	1:28.80; NR
4 × 50 m medley relay	Neutral Athletes B Miron Lifintsev (22.39); Kirill Prigoda (24.94); Arina Surkova (24.43); Daria Trofimova (23.60); Pavel Samusenko^{[c]} Oleg Kostin^{[c]} Daria Klepikova^{[c]}	1:35.36; ER	Canada; Kylie Masse (25.87); Finlay Knox (25.53); Ilya Kharun (20.73); Ingrid Wilm (23.81)	1:35.94; NR	United States; Shaine Casas (22.85); Michael Andrew (25.29); Regan Smith (24.90); Katharine Berkoff (23.16); AJ Pouch^{[c]} Alex Shackell^{[c]} Alex Walsh^{[c]}	1:36.20
4 × 100 m medley relay	Neutral Athletes B Miron Lifintsev (48.90); Kirill Prigoda (54.86); Arina Surkova (55.63); Daria Klepikova (51.08); Pavel Samusenko^{[c]} Aleksandr Zhigalov^{[c]} Daria Trofimova^{[c]}	3:30.47	United States; Regan Smith (54.19); Lilly King (1:03.05); Dare Rose (48.68); Jack Alexy (44.63); Shaine Casas^{[c]} AJ Pouch^{[c]} Alex Shackell^{[c]}	3:30.55	Canada; Ingrid Wilm (55.82); Finlay Knox (56.39); Ilya Kharun (48.27); Mary-Sophie Harvey (51.49); Blake Tierney^{[c]} Sophie Angus^{[c]} Penny Oleksiak^{[c]}	3:31.97

^{c} Swimmers who participated in the heats only and received medals.

== Records ==
The following world and championship records were set during the competition:

=== World records ===
Date	Round	Event	Established for	Time	Name	Nation
10 December	Heat 5	Women's 50 metre butterfly	(same)	24.02	Gretchen Walsh	United States
10 December	Final	Women's 400 metre freestyle	(same)	3:50.25	Summer McIntosh	Canada
10 December	Semifinal 2	Women's 50 metre butterfly	(same)	23.94	Gretchen Walsh	United States
10 December	Semifinal 2	Men's 50 metre butterfly	(same)	21.43	Noè Ponti	Switzerland
10 December	Final	Women's 200 metre individual medley	(same)	2:01.63	Kate Douglass	United States
10 December	Final	Women's 4 × 100 metre freestyle relay	(same)	3:25.01	Kate Douglass (50.95); Katharine Berkoff (51.38); Alex Shackell (52.01); Gretchen Walsh (50.67)	United States
10 December	Final	Men's 4 × 100 metre freestyle relay	(same)	3:01.66	Jack Alexy (45.05); Luke Hobson (45.18); Kieran Smith (46.01); Chris Guiliano (45.42)	United States
11 December	Final	Men's 50 metre butterfly	(same)	21.32	Noè Ponti	Switzerland
12 December	Final	Women's 200 metre butterfly	(same)	1:59.32	Summer McIntosh	Canada
12 December	Semifinal 2	Women's 100 metre individual medley	(same)	55.71	Gretchen Walsh	United States
12 December	Final	Women's 4 × 200 metre freestyle relay	(same)	7:30.13	Alex Walsh (1:53.25); Paige Madden (1:53.18); Katie Grimes (1:53.39); Claire Weinstein (1:50.31)	United States
13 December	Heat 5	Women's 100 metre butterfly	(same)	53.24	Gretchen Walsh	United States
13 December	Semifinal 2	Women's 100 metre butterfly	(same)	52.87	Gretchen Walsh	United States
13 December	Final	Women's 200 metre breaststroke	(same)	2:12.50	Kate Douglass	United States
13 December	Final	Women's 50 metre backstroke	(same)	25.23	Regan Smith	United States
13 December	Final	Women's 100 metre individual medley	(same)	55.11	Gretchen Walsh	United States
13 December	Final	Men's 4 × 200 metre freestyle relay	Men's 200 metre freestyle	1:38.91	Luke Hobson	United States
13 December	Final	Men's 4 × 200 metre freestyle relay	(same)	6:40.51	Luke Hobson (1:38.91); Carson Foster (1:40.77); Shaine Casas (1:40.34); Kieran Smith (1:40.49)	United States
14 December	Heat 10	Men's 50 metre freestyle	(same)	20.08	Jordan Crooks	Cayman Islands
14 December	Semifinal 2	Men's 50 metre freestyle	(same)	19.90	Jordan Crooks	Cayman Islands
14 December	Final	Women's 100 metre butterfly	(same)	52.71	Gretchen Walsh	United States
14 December	Semifinal 2	Women's 50 metre freestyle	(same)	22.87	Gretchen Walsh	United States
14 December	Final	Men's 100 metre butterfly	(same)	47.71	Noè Ponti	Switzerland
14 December	Final	Women's 400 metre individual medley	(same)	4:15.48	Summer McIntosh	Canada
15 December	Final	Women's 50 metre freestyle	(same)	22.83	Gretchen Walsh	United States
15 December	Final	Women's 200 metre backstroke	(same)	1:58.04	Regan Smith	United States
15 December	Final	Men's 200 metre freestyle	(same)	1:38.61	Luke Hobson	United States
15 December	Final	Women's 4 × 100 metre medley relay	Women's 100 metre backstroke	=54.02	Regan Smith	United States
15 December	Final	Women's 4 × 100 metre medley relay	(same)	3:40.41	Regan Smith (54.02); Lilly King (1:03.02); Gretchen Walsh (52.84); Kate Douglass (50.53)	United States
15 December	Final	Men's 4 × 100 metre medley relay	(same)	3:18.68	Miron Lifintsev (49.31); Kirill Prigoda (55.15); Andrei Minakov (48.80); Egor Kornev (45.42)	Neutral Athletes B

=== Championship records ===
Date	Round	Event	Established for	Time	Name	Nation
10 December	Heat 8	Men's 50 metre butterfly	(same)	21.62	Nyls Korstanje	Netherlands
10 December	Heat 9	Men's 50 metre butterfly	(same)	21.53	Noè Ponti	Switzerland
10 December	Final	Men's 200 metre individual medley	(same)	1:49.51	Shaine Casas	United States
10 December	Final	Men's 4 × 100 metre freestyle relay	Men's 100 metre freestyle	45.05	Jack Alexy	United States
11 December	Heat 9	Men's 100 metre freestyle	(same)	44.95	Jordan Crooks	Cayman Islands
11 December	Final	Women's 100 metre backstroke	(same)	54.55	Regan Smith	United States
11 December	Semifinal 2	Women's 100 metre freestyle	(same)	50.49	Gretchen Walsh	United States
11 December	Final	Women's 800 metre freestyle	(same)	8:01.95	Lani Pallister	Australia
12 December	Heat 4	Women's 100 metre individual medley	(same)	56.06	Gretchen Walsh	United States
12 December	Final	Women's 100 metre freestyle	(same)	50.31	Gretchen Walsh	United States
12 December	Final	Men's 200 metre butterfly	(same)	=1:48.24	Ilya Kharun	Canada
12 December	Final	Men's 100 metre breaststroke	(same)	55.47	Qin Haiyang	China
12 December	Semifinal 1	Men's 100 metre individual medley	(same)	50.43	Noè Ponti	Switzerland
13 December	Final	Men's 100 metre individual medley	(same)	50.33	Noè Ponti	Switzerland
14 December	Heat 8	Women's 50 metre freestyle	(same)	23.02	Gretchen Walsh	United States
15 December	Final	Men's 200 metre backstroke	(same)	1:45.65	Hubert Kós	Hungary

== See also ==
- List of swimming competitions
- World Aquatics Swimming Championships (25m)
- 2024 in sports
