= 2024 World Aquatics Swimming Championships (25 m) – Men's 4 × 100 metre medley relay =

Swimming competition

Men's 4 × 100 metre medley relay at the 2024 World Aquatics Swimming Championships (25 m)
- Venue: Duna Arena
- Location: Budapest, Hungary
- Dates: 15 December (heats and final)
- Competitors: 123 from 28 nations
- Teams: 28
- Winning time: 3:18.68 WR

Medalists
gold medal	Miron Lifintsev; Kirill Prigoda; Andrei Minakov; Egor Kornev; Pavel Samusenko; Aleksandr Zhigalov; Dmitrii Zhavoronkov
silver medal	Shaine Casas; Michael Andrew; Dare Rose; Jack Alexy; AJ Pouch; Zach Harting; Harrison Turner	United States
bronze medal	Lorenzo Mora; Ludovico Viberti; Michele Busa; Alessandro Miressi; Christian Bacico; Simone Cerasuolo; Simone Stefanì	Italy

The men's 4 × 100 metre medley relay event at the 2024 World Aquatics Swimming Championships (25 m) was held on 15 December 2024 at the Duna Arena in Budapest, Hungary.

== Records ==
Prior to the competition, the existing world and championship records were as follows.

World record	United States (USA)	3:18.98	Melbourne, Australia	18 December 2022
World record	Australia (AUS)	3:18.98	Melbourne, Australia	18 December 2022
Competition record	United States (USA)	3:18.98	Melbourne, Australia	18 December 2022
Competition record	Australia (AUS)	3:18.98	Melbourne, Australia	18 December 2022

The following new records were set during this competition:

Date	Event	Name	Nation	Time	Record
15 December	Final	Miron Lifintsev (49.31); Kirill Prigoda (55.15); Andrey Minakov (48.80); Egor Kornev (45.42)	Neutral Athletes B	3:18.68	WR

== Results ==
=== Heats ===
The heats were started at 10:41.

Rank	Heat	Lane	Nation	Swimmers	Time	Notes
1	4	1	Poland	Kacper Stokowski (49.34); Jan Kałusowski (57.24); Jakub Majerski (49.11); Ksawery Masiuk (46.01)	3:21.70	Q, NR
2	1	3	Neutral Athletes B	Pavel Samusenko (49.57); Aleksandr Zhigalov (56.37); Andrey Minakov (49.36); Dmitrii Zhavoronkov (46.78)	3:22.08	Q
3	3	3	Canada	Blake Tierney (50.68); Finlay Knox (57.22); Ilya Kharun (48.48); Yuri Kisil (46.28)	3:22.66	Q, NR
4	3	4	United States	Shaine Casas (50.59); AJ Pouch (57.33); Zach Harting (49.92); Chris Guiliano (44.99)	3:22.83	Q
5	4	3	Australia	Isaac Cooper (50.66); Joshua Yong (56.86); Matthew Temple (49.26); Harrison Turner (46.67)	3:23.45	Q
6	4	6	Italy	Christian Bacico (50.80); Simone Cerasuolo (57.62); Simone Stefanì (49.34); Alessandro Miressi (45.77)	3:23.53	Q
7	3	2	Japan	Masaki Yura (50.79); Taku Taniguchi (56.19); Takaya Yasue (49.87); Kaiya Seki (46.82)	3:23.67	Q
8	4	5	France	Yohann Ndoye-Brouard (50.44); Roman Fuchs (58.17); Clément Secchi (49.75); Maxime Grousset (45.52)	3:23.88	Q
9	4	7	Spain	Iván Martínez (51.27); Carles Coll (56.89); Mario Mollá (49.63); Luis Domínguez (46.60)	3:24.39	NR
10	2	4	Switzerland	Thierry Bollin (49.84) NR; Louis Droupy (59.06); Noè Ponti (48.29); Roman Mityukov (47.55)	3:24.74	NR
11	2	6	Sweden	Samuel Törnqvist (50.82) NR; Daniel Kertes (57.31); Robin Hanson (51.06); Elias Persson (47.00)	3:26.19	NR
12	4	2	Germany	Ole Braunschweig (51.05); Melvin Imoudu (57.10); Kaii Winkler (51.27); Martin Wrede (47.00)	3:26.42	
13	3	5	Great Britain	Oliver Morgan (50.92); Archie Goodburn (57.25); Jacob Peters (50.54); Joshua Gammon (48.00)	3:26.71	
14	3	7	Austria	Lukas Edl (51.92); Bernhard Reitshammer (57.56); Andreas Rizek (52.24); Heiko Gigler (46.27)	3:27.99	NR
15	3	1	Ukraine	Oleksandr Zheltiakov (51.99); Volodymyr Lisovets (57.40); Arsenii Kovalov (50.87); Vadym Naumenko (48.49)	3:28.75	
16	4	4	China	Wang Gukailai (51.06); Yu Zongda (57.88); Li Taiyu (52.38); Liu Wudi (47.45)	3:28.77	
17	3	6	South Korea	Lee Ju-ho (52.39); Choi Dong-yeol (57.51); Kim Ji-hun (51.30); Lee Ho-joon (48.16)	3:29.36	NR
18	2	3	Kazakhstan	Yegor Popov (53.62); Arsen Kozhakhmetov (57.91); Adilbek Mussin (50.21); Gleb Kovalenya (47.73)	3:29.47	NR
19	2	1	Turkey	Mert Ali Satır (52.49); Berkay Ömer Öğretir (57.60); Emre Gürdenli (52.05); Berke Saka (47.77)	3:29.91	
20	4	8	Hungary	Bendek Kovács (52.03); Dávid Horváth (59.09); Richárd Márton (51.92); Boldizsár Magda (47.82)	3:30.86	
21	2	2	Hong Kong	Hayden Kwan (52.52); Adam Mak (58.68); Ralph Koo (52.31); Ian Ho (47.53)	3:31.04	
22	1	6	New Zealand	Cooper Morley (51.35); Samuel Brown (1:00.43); Ben Littlejohn (51.92); Hugo Wrathall (48.98)	3:32.68	
23	1	2	Iceland	Guðmundur Leo Rafnsson (53.19); Snorri Dagur Einarsson (58.59); Birnir Freyr Hálfdánarson (53.03); Símon Elías Statkevicius (48.87)	3:33.68	NR
24	1	7	South Africa	Kian Keylock (54.63); Matthew Randle (1:00.04); Ruard van Renen (50.73); Kris Mihaylov (49.32)	3:34.72	
25	2	5	Peru	Joaquín Vargas (54.36); Anthony Puertas (1:02.44); Diego Balbi (51.73); Rafael Ponce (48.08)	3:36.61	NR
26	1	5	Malaysia	Khiew Hoe Yean (53.71); Tan Khai Xin (1:02.74); Bryan Leong (52.65); Lim Yin Chuen (48.29)	3:37.39	
27	2	7	Latvia	Ģirts Feldbergs (52.51); Daniils Bobrovs (1:01.00); Kristaps Miķelsons (54.72); Nikolass Deičmans (49.78)	3:38.01	
	3	8	Brazil	Guilherme Basseto (50.63); Caio Pumputis; Leonardo Coelho Santos; Marco Antônio Ferreira	Disqualified	
	1	4	Slovakia	Did not start		

=== Final ===
The final was held at 19:10.

Rank	Lane	Nation	Swimmers	Time	Notes
1st place, gold medalist(s)	5	Neutral Athletes B	Miron Lifintsev (49.31); Kirill Prigoda (55.15); Andrey Minakov (48.80); Egor Kornev (45.42)	3:18.68	WR
2nd place, silver medalist(s)	6	United States	Shaine Casas (48.92); Michael Andrew (57.03); Dare Rose (48.55); Jack Alexy (44.53)	3:19.03	
3rd place, bronze medalist(s)	7	Italy	Lorenzo Mora (49.53); Ludovico Viberti (56.15); Michele Busa (48.81); Alessandro Miressi (45.42)	3:19.91	
4	4	Poland	Kacper Stokowski (49.10) NR; Jan Kałusowski (56.91); Jakub Majerski (49.16); Ksawery Masiuk (45.85)	3:21.02	NR
5	3	Canada	Blake Tierney (49.87); Finlay Knox (56.71); Ilya Kharun (48.66); Yuri Kisil (45.93)	3:21.17	NR
6	2	Australia	Isaac Cooper (49.81); Joshua Yong (56.91); Matthew Temple (48.60); Maximillian Giuliani (46.71)	3:22.03	
7	8	France	Mewen Tomac (50.01); Roman Fuchs (58.10); Clément Secchi (49.91); Maxime Grousset (44.51)	3:22.53	
8	1	Japan	Masaki Yura (50.64); Taku Taniguchi (56.26); Takaya Yasue (49.77); Kaiya Seki (46.53)	3:23.20	
