= Miron Lifintsev =

Russian swimmer (born 2006)

Personal information
- Native name: Миро́н Алекса́ндрович Лифи́нцев
- Nationality: Russian
- Born: 26 April 2006 (age 20) Vyborg, Russia

Sport
- Sport: Swimming
- Strokes: Backstroke
- Club: Ekran Aquatics Sports School of Olympic Reserve
- Coach: Olga Baydalova
Medal record
Men's swimming
Representing Neutral Athletes B
World Championships (LC)
Gold medal – first place	2025 Singapore	4×100 m medley
Gold medal – first place	2025 Singapore	4×100 m mixed medley
World Championships (SC)
Gold medal – first place	2024 Budapest	50 m backstroke
Gold medal – first place	2024 Budapest	100 m backstroke
Gold medal – first place	2024 Budapest	4×100 m medley
Gold medal – first place	2024 Budapest	4×50 m mixed medley
Gold medal – first place	2024 Budapest	4×100 m mixed medley

Miron Aleksandrovich Lifintsev (Russian: Миро́н Алекса́ндрович Лифи́нцев; born 26 April 2006) is a Russian swimmer. Miron is a 5-time world champion in short course (2024). He specializes in backstroke swimming. Multiple-time Russian champion. Holds the junior world record in the 100-meter backstroke.

== Personal life ==
Lifintsev was born on 26 April 2006, in Vyborg, Leningrad Oblast. From the ages of 4 to 7, he lived in Montenegro, where he began swimming. After moving to Saint Petersburg, he trained at the “Ekran” Specialized Sports School for Water Sports and the Olympic Reserve School No. 1.

In 2023, at the Russian Championships in Kazan, he became a champion in the relay for the first time in his career.

In December 2023, at the Vladimir Salnikov Cup, he set a junior European and Russian record in the 50-meter backstroke — 22.75.

In 2024, at the Russian Championships in Kazan, he won two gold and one bronze medal. He set a new junior world record in the 100m backstroke — 52.34.

In December 2024, Lifintsev, competing as a neutral athlete at the Short Course World Championships in Budapest, as well as in three relays — the mixed 4x50m medley relay, the mixed 4 × 100 m medley relay, and the 4 × 100 m medley relay. In the 50 and 100 meter backstroke events, he set junior world records (22.47 and 48.76, respectively). In the mixed 4x50m medley relay, where Lifintsev swam the first leg, the team of neutral athletes set a European record (1:35.36). In the men's 4 × 100 m medley relay, the team of neutral athletes, with Lifintsev in the first leg, set a world record in the final (3:18.68).
