= Honored Worker of Physical Culture of the Russian Federation =

Honorary title of the Russian Federation

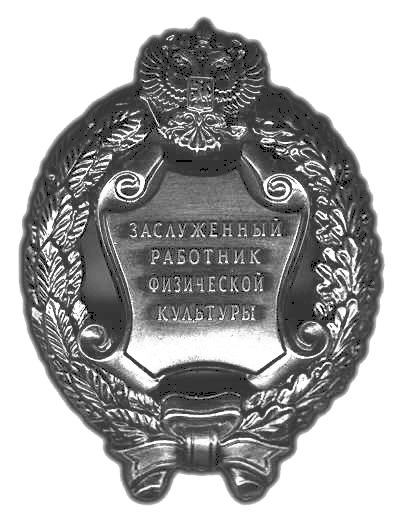
- Honored Worker of Physical Culture of the Russian Federation
- Type: Honorary Title
- Awarded for: Significant contributions to the field of physical culture and sports
- Presented by: Russian Federation
- Eligibility: Organizers of the physical culture movement, scientists, trainers, and employees of sports organizations
- Status: Active
- Established: December 30, 1995
- First award: 1996

Honored Worker of Physical Culture of the Russian Federation is an honorary title included in the system of State Awards of the Russian Federation.

== Grounds for conferral ==
The title "Honored Worker of Physical Culture of the Russian Federation" is conferred upon organizers of the physical culture movement, scientists, trainers, and employees of sports organizations for personal merit in:

- Creating conditions to involve the population in physical culture and sports;
- Promoting physical culture, sports, and a healthy lifestyle;
- Developing youth sports and elite sports within specialized sports schools;
- Creating the infrastructure of All-Russian sports federations, sports organizations of federal executive bodies, and sports infrastructure of general education institutions and higher education institutions engaged in physical culture and sports;
- Preparing national sports teams of the Russian Federation and Russian sports club teams in various sports to participate in domestic and international official sports events;
- Training qualified personnel for organizations engaged in physical culture and sports.

As a rule, the honorary title "Honored Worker of Physical Culture of the Russian Federation" is conferred no earlier than 20 years after the start of professional activity and if the nominee has received departmental awards (incentives) from the federal government or the government of the subjects of the Russian Federation.

== Conferral process ==
Honorary titles of the Russian Federation are conferred by decrees of the President of the Russian Federation based on submissions made to him following consideration of a petition for the award and a proposal from the Commission under the President of the Russian Federation for State Awards.

== History of the Title ==
The honorary title "Honored Worker of Physical Culture of the Russian Federation" was established by Presidential Decree No. 1341 of December 30, 1995, "On the Establishment of Honorary Titles of the Russian Federation, the Approval of Regulations on Honorary Titles, and Descriptions of Badges for Honorary Titles of the Russian Federation". The same decree approved the initial Regulations on the honorary title, which stated:

The honorary title "Honored Worker of Physical Culture of the Russian Federation" is conferred upon organizers of the physical culture movement, scientists, and trainers, employees of physical culture collectives, sports facilities, physical culture organizations, educational institutions, and research institutes for merit in the development of physical culture and sports, in organizational and methodological, training, educational, engineering and technical, scientific and pedagogical, and economic activities, improving the system of physical education of the population, mass sports, elite sports, and who have worked in the field of physical culture and sports for 15 or more years.

In its current form, the Regulations on the honorary title were approved by Presidential Decree No. 1099 of September 7, 2010, "On Measures to Improve the State Award System of the Russian Federation".

== Badge ==
The badge has a uniform design for honorary titles of the Russian Federation and is made of silver, 40 mm in height and 30 mm in width. It takes the form of an oval wreath formed by laurel and oak branches. The crossed ends of the branches are tied with a ribbon at the bottom. The State Emblem of the Russian Federation is located on the upper part of the wreath. On the obverse, in the central part, a cartouche is superimposed on the wreath with an inscription bearing the name of the honorary title.

A pin for attaching the badge to clothing is located on the reverse. The badge is worn on the right side of the chest.

== Transitional Period ==
Until the adoption of Presidential Decree No. 1341 of December 30, 1995, legal acts on the establishment of honorary titles of the RSFSR were in effect in Russia. After the renaming of the state from "Russian Soviet Federative Socialist Republic" to "Russian Federation" (see Law of the RSFSR No. 2094-I of December 25, 1991), the name "RSFSR" in the titles of all honorary titles was replaced by the words "of the Russian Federation." Thus, from 1992 to March 30, 1996, the same type of honorary title of the RSFSR, which had existed since 1972, with a name identical to the modern one, was conferred.

== Literature ==
- Shchegolev, K.A. (2009). Modern Awards of Russia. Traditions and Continuity. History of Awards. M.: Veche. p. 350. ISBN 978-5-9533-3696-3.
- Vinokurov, V. A. (2012). The System of State Awards of the Russian Federation: History, Modernity and Development Prospects. M.: Delo. p. 243. ISBN 978-5-7749-0725-0.
- Goncharov, A. I. (2010). The Award System of the Russian Federation. M.: Posev. p. 254.
