= Ivan Giryov =

Russian swimmer (born 2000)

Ivan Girev
Personal information
- Nationality: Russian
- Born: 29 June 2000 (age 26) Gavrilov-Yam, Russia

Sport
- Sport: Swimming
- Strokes: Freestyle
- Club: Energy Standard
Medal record
Representing (Russia) ROC
Olympic Games
Silver medal – second place	2020 Tokyo	4×200 m freestyle
Representing Neutral Athletes B
World Championships (LC)
Gold medal – first place	2025 Singapore	4×100 m medley
Silver medal – second place	2025 Singapore	4x100 m mixed freestyle
European Championships (LC)
Gold medal – first place	2026 Paris	4x100 m mixed freestyle
Silver medal – second place	2026 Paris	4×100 m freestyle
Bronze medal – third place	2026 Paris	4×200 m mixed freestyle
Representing Russian Swimming Federation
World Championships (SC)
Silver medal – second place	2021 Abu Dhabi	4×200 m freestyle
Representing Russia
World Championships
Silver medal – second place	2019 Gwangju	4×200 m freestyle
World Championships (SC)
Silver medal – second place	2018 Hangzhou	4×200 m freestyle
European Championships (LC)
Gold medal – first place	2020 Budapest	4×100 m freestyle
Gold medal – first place	2020 Budapest	4×200 m freestyle
Bronze medal – third place	2020 Budapest	4×200 m mixed freestyle

Ivan Aleksandrovich Girev (Russian: Иван Александрович Гирёв, IPA: [ɪˈvan ɡʲɪˈrʲɵf]; born 29 June 2000) is a Russian swimmer.

He participated at the 2019 World Aquatics Championships, winning a medal.
