= Daria Trofimova =

Russian swimmer (born 2005)

Personal information
- Nationality: Russian
- Born: May 11, 2005 (age 21)

Sport
- Sport: Swimming
- Strokes: Medley, freestyle
Medal record
Women's swimming
Representing Neutral Athletes B
World Championships (LC)
Gold medal – first place	2025 Singapore	4×100 m mixed medley
Silver medal – second place	2025 Singapore	4×100 m mixed freestyle
World Championships (SC)
Gold medal – first place	2024 Budapest	4×50 m mixed medley
Gold medal – first place	2024 Budapest	4×100 m mixed medley

Daria Trofimova (born 11 May 2005) is a Russian competitive swimmer.

== Career ==
In December 2024, Trofimova competed at the 2024 Short Course World Championships and won gold medals in the mixed 4×50 metre medley relay with a European record time of 1:35.36, and mixed 4×100 metre medley relay events. She then competed at 2025 World Aquatics Championships representing the Neutral Athletes B. During the competition she won a gold medal in the mixed 4×100 metre medley relay with a World Championships record time of 3:37.97. She also won a silver medal in the mixed 4×100 metre freestyle relay with a European Record time of 3:19.68.
