= 2022 European Junior Swimming Championships =

Water sport competitions

- Host city: Otopeni, Romania
- Dates: 5-10 July 2022

The 2022 European Junior Swimming Championships were held from 5 to 10 July 2022 in Otopeni, Romania. The Championships were for girls aged 14–17 and boys age 15–18.

== Results ==
=== Boys ===
Games	Gold		Silver		Bronze	
50 m freestyle	David Popovici; Romania	22.16	Jere Hribar; Croatia	22.55	Martin Kartavi; Israel	22.57
100 m freestyle	David Popovici; Romania	47.69	Jacob Whittle; Great Britain	48.65	Nikolas Antoniou; Cyprus	49.67 NR
200 m freestyle	David Popovici; Romania	1:45.45	Lorenzo Galossi; Italy	1:47.71	Jacob Whittle; Great Britain	1:47.85
400 m freestyle	Lorenzo Galossi; Italy	3:48.14	Krzysztof Chmielewski; Poland Vlad Stancu; Romania	3:50.61	Not awarded	
800 m freestyle	Lorenzo Galossi; Italy	7:52.04	Vlad Stancu; Romania	7:54.02; NR	Krzysztof Chmielewski; Poland	7:56.81
1500 m freestyle	Vlad Stancu; Romania	15:05.47; NR	Krzysztof Chmielewski; Poland	15:13.46	Emir Batur Albayrak; Turkey	15:15.24; NRU16
50 m backstroke	Ksawery Masiuk; Poland	24.65	Jonny Marshall; Great Britain	25.21	Áron Székely; Hungary	25.36
100 m backstroke	Ksawery Masiuk; Poland	52.91; CR	Oleksandr Zheltyakov; Ukraine	54.26	Jonny Marshall; Great Britain	54.42
200 m backstroke	Ksawery Masiuk; Poland	1:56.62	Oleksandr Zheltyakov; Ukraine	1:57.65	Filip Kosiński; Poland	1:58.93
50 m breaststroke	Volodymyr Lisovets; Ukraine	27.62	Koen de Groot; Netherlands	27.65	Uroš Živanović; Serbia	27.69
100 m breaststroke	Volodymyr Lisovets; Ukraine	1:00.96	Koen de Groot; Netherlands	1:01.21	Steijn Louter; Netherlands	1:01.32
200 m breaststroke	Lucien Vergnes; France	2:13.02	Luka Mladenovic; Austria	2:13.21	George Smith; Great Britain	2:13.79
50 m butterfly	Casper Puggaard; Denmark	23.67	Daniel Gracík; Czech Republic	23.94	Ethan Dumesnil; France	24.17
100 m butterfly	Daniel Gracík; Czech Republic	52.69	Casper Puggaard; Denmark	53.05	Ethan Dumesnil; France	53.35
200 m butterfly	Krzysztof Chmielewski; Poland	1:55.49	Michał Chmielewski; Poland	1:56.68	Ramil Valizada; Azerbaijan	1:58.35
200 m individual medley	Sanberk Yiğit Oktar; Turkey	2:00.68	Simone Spediacci; Italy	2:02.65	Michał Piela; Poland	2:02.77
400 m individual medley	Michał Piela; Poland	4:20.50	Zsombor Bujdosó; Hungary	4:21.64	Vasileios Sofikitis; Greece	4:22.22
4×100 m freestyle relay	Romania David Popovici (47.54); Vlad Stancu (51.11); Ștefan Cozma (50.56); Patrick Dinu (49.72); Alexandru Constantinescu	3:18.93	Great Britain Jacob Whittle (48.69); Alexander Painter (49.91); Evan Jones (49.80); Reuben Rowbotham-Keating (50.61); Calvin Fry	3:19.01	Italy Lorenzo Galossi (50.08); Elia Codardini (49.96); Davide Passafaro (49.89); Francesco Lazzari (49.89); Simone Locchi	3:19.42
4×200 m freestyle relay	Italy Alessandro Ragaini (1:50.06); Filippo Bertoni (1:48.25); Massimo Chiaroni (1:50.38); Lorenzo Galossi (1:48.76)	7:17.45	Turkey Sanberk Yiğit Oktar (1:49.39); Atakan Malgil (1:50.68); Temiz Tolga (1:51.41); Batuhan Filiz (1:49.51)	7:20.99	Poland Ksawery Masiuk (1:49.12); Krzysztof Matuszewski (1:52.28); Adam Zdybel (1:50.16); Jakub Walter (1:49.77)	7:21.33
4×100 m medley relay	Great Britain Jonny Marshall (54.54); Elliot Woodburn (1:00.99); Evan Jones (53.97); Jacob Whittle (47.94); Matthew Ward; Harvey Freeman; Antonio Rodriguez; Alexander Painter	3:37.44	Ukraine Oleksandr Zheltyakov (54.72); Volodymyr Lisovets (59.77); Arsenii Kovalov (53.49); Yurii Zhovtko (50.04); David Kyzymenko; Georgiy Lukashev	3:38.02	Poland Ksawery Masiuk (53.28); Filip Urbanski (1:02.30); Michal Chmielewski (53.29); Krzysztof Matuszewski (50.02); Filip Kosinski; Maciej Gulinski	3:38.89

=== Girls ===
Games	Gold		Silver		Bronze	
50 m freestyle	Nina Jazy; Germany	25.22	Bianca Costea; Romania	25.34	Sara Curtis; Italy	25.39
100 m freestyle	Nikolett Pádár; Hungary	54.69	Dóra Molnár; Hungary	55.20	Roos Vanotterdijk; Belgium	55.34
200 m freestyle	Nikolett Pádár; Hungary	1:58.43	Giulia Vetrano; Italy	1:59.60	Merve Tuncel; Turkey	2:00.02
400 m freestyle	Merve Tuncel; Turkey	4:07.30	Giulia Vetrano; Italy	4:11.77	Nikolett Pádár; Hungary	4:12.04
800 m freestyle	Merve Tuncel; Turkey	8:28.32	Alexa Reyna; France	8:38.04	Giulia Vetrano; Italy	8:40.71
1500 m freestyle	Merve Tuncel; Turkey	16:13.68	Alexa Reyna; France	16:21.46	Julia Barth; Germany	16:33.87
50 m backstroke	Mary-Ambre Moluh; France	27.74; CR	Lora Komoróczy; Hungary	28.31	Roos Vanotterdijk; Belgium	28.62
100 m backstroke	Dóra Molnár; Hungary	1:00.88	Roos Vanotterdijk; Belgium	1:00.90 NR	Mary-Ambre Moluh; France	1:01.36
200 m backstroke	Dóra Molnár; Hungary	2:10.31	Laura Bernat; Poland	2:11.07	Evie Dilley; Great Britain	2:11.19
50 m breaststroke	Eneli Jefimova; Estonia	30.44	Schastine Tabor; Denmark	31.31	Karolina Piechowicz; Poland	31.44
100 m breaststroke	Eneli Jefimova; Estonia	1:06.50	Justine Delmas; France	1:08.80	Olivia Klint Ipsa; Sweden	1:09.29
200 m breaststroke	Eneli Jefimova; Estonia	2:26.85; NR	Justine Delmas; France	2:26.86	Defne Coşkun; Turkey	2:27.51
50 m butterfly	Lana Pudar; Bosnia and Herzegovina	26.49	Roos Vanotterdijk; Belgium	26.63	Jana Pavalić; Croatia	26.76
100 m butterfly	Roos Vanotterdijk; Belgium	57.85 NR	Lana Pudar; Bosnia and Herzegovina	57.88	Julia Ullmann; Switzerland	59.39
200 m butterfly	Lana Pudar; Bosnia and Herzegovina	2:08.92	Tabatha Avetand; France	2:12.06	Anna Porcari; Italy	2:12.20
200 m individual medley	Leah Schlosshan; Great Britain	2:13.49	Lilla Minna Abraham; Hungary	2:14.28	Emma Carrasco; Spain	2:14.39
400 m individual medley	Emma Carrasco; Spain	4:46.39	Belis Şakar; Turkey	4:47.11	Vivien Jackl; Hungary	4:47.51
4×100 m freestyle relay	Italy Veronica Quaggio (56.31); Marina Cacciapuoti (55.37); Sara Curtis (56.50); Matilde Biagiotti (54.80)	3:42.98	France Mary-Ambre Moluh (55.62); Emmy Preiter (56.47); Melora Trompette (56.01); Giulia Rossi-Bene (55.39); Albane Cachot; Mathilde Pruvot	3:43.49	Germany Lisa-Marie Finger (56.40); Celina Springer (57.02); Maya Werner (57.56); Nina Jazy (54.65); Julianna Dora Bocska; Jette Lenz	3:45.63
4×200 m freestyle relay	Hungary Lilla Abraham (1:59.42); Dóra Molnár (2:00.55); Lili Gyurinovics (2:01.78); Nikolett Pádár (1:57.29)	7:59.04	Italy Giulia Vetrano (2:00.19); Matilde Biagiotti (2:01.48); Helena Musetti (2:03.35); Aurora Zanin (2:03.91)	8:08.93	Great Britain Hollie Widdows (2:02.22); Emma Croker (2:04.45); Ashleigh Baillie (2:04.65); Erin Little (2:02.10)	8:13.42
4×100 m medley relay	France Mary-Ambre Moluh (1:01.78); Justine Delmas (1:08.41); Tabatha Avetand (59.95); Giulia Rossi-Bene (55.19); Zoe Carlos-Broc	4:05.33	Hungary Dóra Molnár (1:01.58); Dorottya Barna Bianka (1:09.37); Lora Komoróczy (1:00.49); Nikolett Pádár (54.04)	4:05.48	Italy Sara Curtis (1:01.92); Irene Mati (1:09.15); Paola Borrelli (59.35); Matilde Biagiotti (55.28); Benedetta Scalise; Chiara Della Corte; Alice Beltrame; Marina Cacciapuoti	4:05.70

=== Mixed events ===
Games	Gold		Silver		Bronze	
4×100 m freestyle relay	Hungary Magda Boldizsár (50.53); Benedek Bóna (49.53); Nikolett Pádár (54.28); Dóra Molnár (54.49)	3:28.83	Romania David Popovici (47.34); Patrick Dinu (50.03); Bianca Costea (55.47); Rebecca Diaconescu (56.51); Ștefan Cozma; Anastasia Bako; Irina Preda	3:29.35	Poland Ksawery Masiuk (48.37); Krzysztof Matuszewski (49.75); Julia Kulik (55.10); Paulina Cierpiałowska (56.63)	3:29.85
4×100 m medley relay	France Mary-Ambre Moluh (1:01.38); Lucien Vergnes (1:01.37); Yohan Airaud (52.83); Giulia Rossi-Bene (54.97); Zoe Carlos-Broc; Yohan Airaud; Melora Trompette	3:50.55	Great Britain Jonny Marshall (54.69); Elliot Woodburn (1:01.31); Hollie Widdows (1:00.23); Erin Little (55.75)	3:51.98	Ukraine Nika Sharafutdinova (1:02.52); Volodymyr Lisovets (1:00.04); Arsenii Kovalov (53.29); Mariya Dyachenko (56.88)	3:52.73 NR

== Medal table ==
* Host nation (Romania)

Rank	Nation	Gold	Silver	Bronze	Total
1	Hungary	6	5	3	14
2	Poland	5	4	7	16
3	Romania*	5	4	0	9
4	France	4	6	3	13
5	Italy	4	5	5	14
6	Turkey	4	2	3	9
7	Estonia	3	0	0	3
8	Great Britain	2	4	5	11
9	Ukraine	2	3	1	6
10	Bosnia and Herzegovina	2	1	0	3
11	Belgium	1	2	2	5
12	Denmark	1	2	0	3
13	Czech Republic	1	1	0	2
14	Germany	1	0	2	3
15	Spain	1	0	1	2
16	Netherlands	0	2	1	3
17	Croatia	0	1	1	2
18	Austria	0	1	0	1
19	Azerbaijan	0	0	1	1
19	Cyprus	0	0	1	1
19	Greece	0	0	1	1
19	Israel	0	0	1	1
19	Serbia	0	0	1	1
19	Sweden	0	0	1	1
19	Switzerland	0	0	1	1
Totals (25 entries)		42	43	41	126

== Team Trophy ==
Results:

Rank	Team	Points
1	Italy	780
2	Great Britain	726
3	France	646
4	Hungary	609
5	Poland	563
6	Turkey	355
7	Ukraine	317
8	Romania	284
9	Germany	278
10	Israel	268

Rank	Team	Points
11	Spain	237
12	Denmark	231
13	Croatia	155
14	Czech Republic	148
15	Lithuania	133
16	Greece	126
17	Estonia	122
18	Belgium	109
19	Netherlands	86
20	Switzerland	84

== Diving ==
MEDALS AFTER 17/17 EVENTS

* Host nation (Romania)

Rank	Nation	Gold	Silver	Bronze	Total
1	Italy	6	5	1	12
2	Ukraine	4	0	4	8
3	Great Britain	3	5	5	13
4	Germany	3	4	3	10
5	Sweden	1	2	0	3
6	Spain	0	1	0	1
7	Croatia	0	0	2	2
8	Finland	0	0	1	1
8	Ireland	0	0	1	1
Totals (9 entries)		17	17	17	51

=== Boys ===
Games	Gold		Silver		Bronze	
1 m springboard A	Matteo Santoro; Italy	478.15	Stefano Belotti; Italy	478.10	Jake Passmore; Ireland	455.00
1 m springboard B	Kyrylo Azarov; Ukraine	407.50	Oscar Kane; Great Britain	379.15	Marko Huljev; Croatia	364.65
3 m springboard A	Matteo Santoro; Italy	585.60	Jonathan Schauer; Germany	547.10	Leon Baker; Great Britain	532.10
3 m springboard B	Kyrylo Azarov; Ukraine	448.20	Todd Geggus; Great Britain	445.45	Maksym Mirza; Ukraine	422.85
Platform A	Jaden Eikermann; Germany	523.15	Francesco Casalini; Italy	488.40	Robbie Lee; Great Britain	480.30
Platform B	Jordan Fisher-Eames; Great Britain	396.35	Simone Conte; Italy	396.00	Marko Barsukov; Ukraine	371.90
3 m synchronised springboard	Italy; Stefano Belotti; Matteo Santoro	284.49	Great Britain; Leon Baker; Hugo Thomas	280.32	Croatia; David Ledinski; Matej Nevescanin	275.16
Synchronised platform	Great Britain; Robbie Lee; Euan McCabe	265.74	Italy; Francesco Casalini; Tommaso Zanella	263.16	Ukraine; Danylo Avanesov; Marko Barsukov	254.76

=== Girls ===
Games	Gold		Silver		Bronze	
1 m springboard A	Anna Arnautova; Ukraine	403.85	Lotti Hubert; Germany	391.05	Elisa Pizzini; Italy	388.25
1 m springboard B	Giorgia De Sanctis; Italy	326.70	Signe Stahl; Sweden	323.85	Eerika Repo; Finland	297.75
3 m springboard A	Lotti Hubert; Germany	437.25	Elisa Pizzini; Italy	415.35	Evie Smith; Great Britain	404.85
3 m springboard B	Giorgia De Sanctis; Italy	331.25	Vanessa Roehniss; Germany	318.65	Julina Schnabel; Germany	312.45
Platform A	Amanda Lundin; Sweden	354.45	Ana Carvajal San Miguel; Spain	348.25	Chloe Johnson; Great Britain	348.15
Platform B	Maisie Bond; Great Britain	334.95	Cora Luise Schiebold; Germany	309.80	Sina Van Der Laan; Germany	303.25
3 m synchronised springboard	Ukraine; Anna Arnautova; Nika Shurda	257.40	Sweden; Nina Janmyr; Elna Widerström	251.55	Great Britain; Tilly Brown; Evie Smith	248.34
Synchronised platform	Germany; Frieda Dummer; Carolina Coordes	237.42	Great Britain; Chloe Johnson; Hannah Newbrook	235.77	Ukraine; Sofia Esman; Sofiia Ivanova	223.80

=== Mixed ===
Games	Gold		Silver		Bronze	
Jump event	Italy; Francesco Casalini; Valerio Mosca; Elisa Pizzini; Matteo Santoro	300.85	Great Britain; Maya Kutty; Oscar Kane; Leon Baker; Oscar Willcox	292.90	Germany; Jaden Eikermann; Lotti Hubert; Espen Prenzyna; Julina Schnabel	281.30
