= David Popovici =

Romanian swimmer (born 2004)

David Popovici KSR
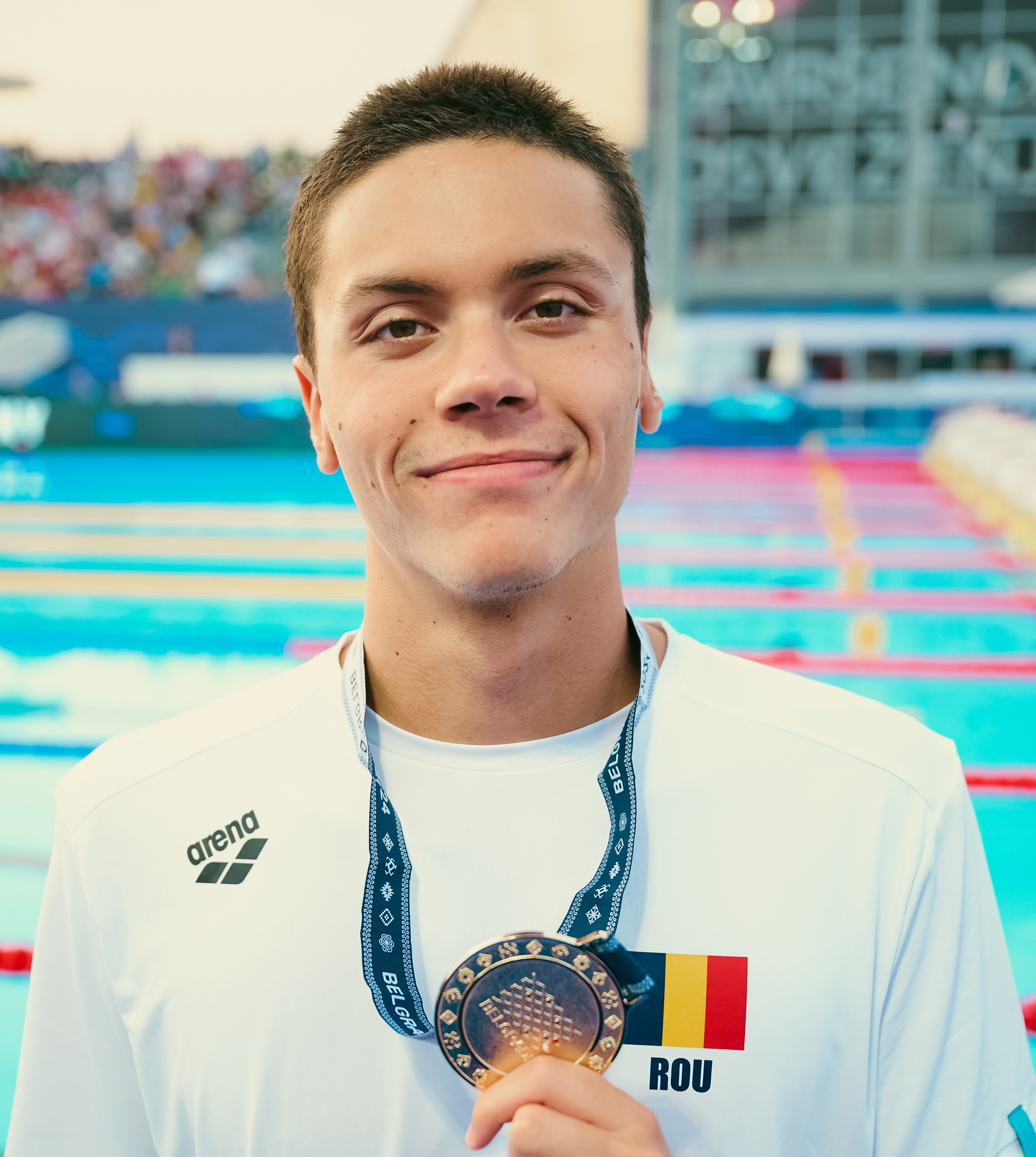
- Popovici in 2024

Personal information
- National team: Romania
- Born: 15 September 2004 (age 22) Bucharest, Romania
- Height: 1.90 m (6 ft 3 in)
- Weight: 80 kg (176 lb)

Sport
- Sport: Swimming
- Strokes: Freestyle
- Club: CS Dinamo București
- Coach: Adrian Rădulescu
Medal record
Men's swimming
Representing Romania
Event	1st	2nd	3rd
Summer Olympics	1	0	1
World Championships (LC)	4	0	0
World Championships (SC)	0	1	0
European Championships (LC)	6	0	0
European Championships (SC)	1	0	1
Total	12	1	2
Olympic Games Olympic Games
Gold medal – first place	2024 Paris	200 m freestyle
Bronze medal – third place	2024 Paris	100 m freestyle
World Championships (LC)
Gold medal – first place	2022 Budapest	100 m freestyle
Gold medal – first place	2022 Budapest	200 m freestyle
Gold medal – first place	2025 Singapore	100 m freestyle
Gold medal – first place	2025 Singapore	200 m freestyle
World Championships (SC)
Silver medal – second place	2022 Melbourne	200 m freestyle
European Championships (LC)
Gold medal – first place	2022 Rome	100 m freestyle
Gold medal – first place	2022 Rome	200 m freestyle
Gold medal – first place	2024 Belgrade	100 m freestyle
Gold medal – first place	2024 Belgrade	200 m freestyle
Gold medal – first place	2026 Paris	100 m freestyle
Gold medal – first place	2026 Paris	200 m freestyle
European Championships (SC)
Gold medal – first place	2021 Kazan	200 m freestyle
Bronze medal – third place	2023 Otopeni	100 m freestyle
European U-23 Championships
Gold medal – first place	2025 Samorin	100 m freestyle
Gold medal – first place	2025 Samorin	200 m freestyle
Bronze medal – third place	2025 Samorin	50 m freestyle
World Junior Championships
Gold medal – first place	2022 Lima	100 m freestyle
Gold medal – first place	2022 Lima	200 m freestyle
Gold medal – first place	2022 Lima	4×100 m freestyle relay
Silver medal – second place	2022 Lima	4×100 m mixed freestyle relay
European Junior Championships
Gold medal – first place	2021 Rome	50 m freestyle
Gold medal – first place	2021 Rome	100 m freestyle
Gold medal – first place	2021 Rome	200 m freestyle
Gold medal – first place	2022 Otopeni	50 m freestyle
Gold medal – first place	2022 Otopeni	100 m freestyle
Gold medal – first place	2022 Otopeni	200 m freestyle
Gold medal – first place	2022 Otopeni	4×100 m freestyle relay
Silver medal – second place	2021 Rome	4×100 m freestyle relay
Silver medal – second place	2022 Otopeni	4×100 m mixed freestyle relay
European Youth Olympic Festival
Gold medal – first place	2019 Baku	100 m freestyle
Silver medal – second place	2019 Baku	50 m freestyle
Silver medal – second place	2019 Baku	200 m freestyle

David Popovici KSR (Romanian pronunciation: [ˈdavid poˈpovit͡ʃʲ]; born 15 September 2004) is a Romanian competitive swimmer who specializes in freestyle events and is the reigning Olympic champion in the 200-metre event, having won the gold medal at the 2024 Summer Olympics. He is the current holder of the European record and the junior world record, as well as the former holder of the world record in the long course 100-metre freestyle. He is also the holder of the current junior world record in the short course 100-metre freestyle event and in the long course 200-metre freestyle event.

At the 2022 World Aquatics Championships, Popovici won gold medals in his two signature events (Men's 100-metre freestyle and Men's 200-metre freestyle), becoming the first swimmer to do so at the same edition of the World Championships, since Jim Montgomery in 1973. Following his performances during the 2022 long course season, in which he won eleven gold medals and two silver medals, Popovici was voted Male Swimmer of the Year by both SwimSwam and Swimming World Magazine. He was also named the BTA Best Balkan Athlete of the Year of 2022. During that summer, he established an unprecedented level of dominance, especially in the long course 100-metre freestyle, recording 13 of the 19-fastest swims in the world in 2022, while also becoming only the third swimmer in history to set an under 1:43 time in the long course 200-metre freestyle. At the 2024 Paris Olympics, he placed third in the 100-metre freestyle, earning the bronze medal, finishing just 0.01 seconds behind Australia's Kyle Chalmers. From 2022 to 2025, he is the #1 in the world rankings in the men's 200 long course 200-metre freestyle.

== Early life ==
Popovici was born in Bucharest, Romania, and he started swimming at Lia Manoliu pool at the age of 4, at a doctor's recommendation to correct early stage scoliosis. At the age of 9 he began to train at Aqua Team Bucharest, under coach Adrian Rădulescu, a former swimmer with a PhD in athletic performance specialized in swimming. At the age of 10, Popovici broke his first junior national record, in 50 m backstroke – a 24-year-old record held by Dragoș Coman, a 2003 world bronze medalist. At 14 he became the fastest swimmer under 15 in the history of the European Youth Olympic Festival, swimming 100 meters in 49.82 seconds.

== Swimming career ==
=== 2021: Olympic debut ===
==== 2020 European Championships ====
At the 2020 European Aquatics Championships in Budapest, which took place from 10 to 23 May 2021 due to the COVID-19 pandemic, Popovici managed to swim below the Olympic Qualifying Time in the Men's 100-metre freestyle event and by doing so, he qualified for the Tokyo 2020 Olympics, being the youngest member of the Romanian team. He broke the Romanian national record three times during the event (in the heats, semifinal and final), finishing sixth place in the final. Popovici also competed in the Men's 50-metre freestyle and the Men's 200-metre freestyle, meeting the Olympic Selection Time in both of the events.

==== 2021 European Junior Championships ====
2021 European Junior Championships
Gold medal – first place	50 m freestyle	22.22
Gold medal – first place	100 m freestyle	47.30 (WJ)
Gold medal – first place	200 m freestyle	1:45.95
Silver medal – second place	4×100 m freestyle relay	3:19.94

Popovici won a total of four medals, at the 2021 European Junior Swimming Championships in Rome, where he broke the 100-metre freestyle junior world record twice. In the 4x100-metre freestyle relay, he broke the junior world record for the first time, with a time of 47.56, helping the relay win the silver medal. Two days later, he managed to break the same junior world record again, this time in the 100-metre freestyle event, to win the gold medal, with a time of 47.30. This performance made Popovici the fastest man in the world at that time in 2021, surpassing Kliment Kolesnikov. His second gold medal of the European Junior Championships came in the 200-metre freestyle event, where he broke another junior world record in the semifinal, with a time of 1:45.26. He won his third gold medal in the 50-metre freestyle event, where he finished 0.61 seconds ahead of second-place finisher Nikita Chernousov.

==== 2020 Summer Olympics ====
At the 2020 Summer Olympics in Tokyo, which were postponed to 2021 due to the COVID-19 pandemic, Popovici competed in the 50-metre, 100-metre, and 200-metre freestyle individual events, following his good performances at the European Championships. While he did not win a medal, he was only 0.02 seconds behind bronze medalist Fernando Scheffer, and ahead of Martin Malyutin (who won the gold medal at the European Championships), as he finished fourth in the Men's 200-metre freestyle, with a time of 1:44.68. In the Men's 100-metre freestyle, Popovici once again asserted himself as a medal contender, qualifying for the final (47.72) and ultimately placing seventh, with a time of 48.04.

==== 2021 European Short Course Championships ====
2021 European Championships (SC)
Gold medal – first place	200 m freestyle	1:42.12 (NR)

To follow-up a pair of national records accomplished while racing at the FINA World Cup meet in Kazan, clocking respective performances of 46.77 in the 100-metre freestyle, and 1:43.58 in the 200-metre freestyle, Popovici entered to compete at the 2021 European Short Course Swimming Championships held at the Kazan Aquatics Palace in Russia. On 6 November, Popovici won the gold medal in the Men's 200-metre freestyle event, with a time of 1:42.12, breaking his own national record from the World Cup. He failed to qualify for the finals in the Men's 100-metre freestyle, and Men's 400-metre freestyle individual events.

==== 2021 World Short Course Championships ====
In his first of two events at the 2021 World Short Course Championships, the 400-metre freestyle on 16 December, Popovici placed thirty-second with a time of 3:46.08 and did not qualify for the evening final. For his second event, the 200-metre freestyle the following day, he ranked fourteenth in the preliminary heats with a 1:43.62, not qualifying for the final of the event.

=== 2022: Double world champion and world record holder at seventeen ===
==== 2022 World Championships ====
2022 World Championships (LC)
Gold medal – first place	100 m freestyle	47.58
Gold medal – first place	200 m freestyle	1:43.21 (WJ)

At the 2022 World Championships, Popovici won gold medals in the Men's 100-metre freestyle and the Men's 200-metre freestyle, becoming the first swimmer in 49 years to win gold in both sprint events, at the same edition of the world championships. Popovici dominated throughout the heats, semifinals and final of the 200-metre freestyle event, firstly clocking a personal best 1:44.40 in the semifinal, to take the top seed and break a world junior record. In the final, on 20 June, he finished 1.26 seconds ahead of his closest competitor, Hwang Sun-woo, touching the wall at 1:43.21 to become the fourth fastest performer of all-time (second fastest performer of all time in a textile swimsuit) and win the gold medal. This performance made Popovici the second-youngest swimmer to win the Men's 200-metre freestyle event at the world championships (following Tim Shaw), at only 17 years and 278 days old. On Day 4, in the semifinal of the 100-metre freestyle, Popovici broke his third world junior record in as many days by clocking a 47.13, heading into the final as the top seed by nearly half a second. On the next day, in the final, he managed to win his second gold medal, touching at 47.58 for a come-from-behind victory, just .06 ahead of France's Maxime Grousset.

==== 2022 European Junior Championships ====
2022 European Junior Championships
Gold medal – first place	50 m freestyle	22.16
Gold medal – first place	100 m freestyle	47.69
Gold medal – first place	200 m freestyle	1:45.45
Gold medal – first place	4×100 m freestyle relay	3:18.93
Silver medal – second place	4×100 m mixed freestyle relay	3:29.35 (NR)

At the 2022 European Junior Championships in Otopeni, Popovici competed in five individual and relay events, winning either gold or silver in all five of them, and helping his compatriots to what was going to be Romania's most successful European Junior Championships. Matching his individual performances in Rome from last year, he won the gold medal in the Men's 50-metre, 100-metre, and 200-metre freestyle events, most notably winning the 200-metre freestyle final with a time of 1:45.45, which was 2.26 seconds ahead of silver medalist Lorenzo Galossi. On 5 July, Popovici led off the Romanian Men's 4×100 freestyle relay in 47.54, as the quartet composed of himself, Vlad Stancu, Ștefan Cozma and Patrick Dinu won gold in front of a home crowd, with a time of 3:18.93. One day later, on 6 July, Popovici was part of the Romanian relay that won the silver medal in the Mixed 4x100-metre freestyle, along with Patrick Dinu, Bianca Costea, and Rebecca Diaconescu.

==== 2022 European Championships ====
2022 European Championships (LC)
Gold medal – first place	100 m freestyle	46.86 (WR)
Gold medal – first place	200 m freestyle	1:42.97 (WJ, NR)

Popovici kept his momentum rolling from the world championships into Rome, where he entered to compete at the 2022 European Aquatics Championships. His meet started with the 100-metre freestyle, where in the prelims he clocked a new championship record of 47.20. He followed that up with a 46.98 performance in the semifinals, setting a new world junior record and European record. Furthermore, his closing split in the semifinals (24.05), became the fastest in the history of the event at that time. On 13 August 2022, Popovici one-upped himself in the final, touching at 46.86 to not only win gold, but break César Cielo's 13-year-old world record in the event, by 0.05 seconds. The Romanian was not leading at the halfway mark of the race, opening in 22.74 and trailing Maxime Grousset with fifty meters left to go. However, he came home in a scintillating 24.12 final fifty, and ended up winning 0.61 seconds ahead of his closest competitor.

Following his performances in the semifinals and the final, Popovici became the first swimmer to crack the 47-second mark two times. On 14 August, he once again proved he was in top form in the 200-metre freestyle event, moving through the prelims and the semifinals easily, and dropping the hammer in the final the following day, clocking a new world junior record of 1:42.97, to win his second gold medal. This performance made him the fastest textile performer in the history of the event and third fastest all-time behind Michael Phelps and world record holder Paul Biedermann. On 17 August, Popovici swum in the heats of the Men's 400-metre freestyle event, clocking a personal best of 3:47.99, but later withdrew from the final. Following the conclusion of the competition, LEN, the official governing body of European Aquatics, announced that David Popovici was named the male swimmer of the meet, as his performances earned him the highest number of FINA points during the championships.

==== 2022 World Junior Championships ====
2022 World Junior Championships
Gold medal – first place	100 m freestyle	47.13
Gold medal – first place	200 m freestyle	1:46.18 (CR)
Gold medal – first place	4×100 m freestyle relay	3:18.84
Silver medal – second place	4×100 m mixed freestyle relay	3:30.39

Two weeks before his eighteenth birthday, Popovici competed at the 2022 World Junior Championships in Lima, in his final long course international competition as a junior athlete. On the first day, 30 August, Popovici helped the Romanian relay to a gold medal in the Men's 4x100-metre freestyle event, finishing 1.45 seconds ahead of the French relay that won the silver medal. He twice lowered the FINA World Junior Championship Record in the 100-metre freestyle; first by leading off the relay in prelims, and then again in the final. The next day, he managed to do the same in the 200-metre freestyle, as he captured the gold medal, covering his four laps in a champion-record mark of 1:46.18. Popovici ended up touching the wall almost three seconds before silver medalist Dániel Mészáros, who was timed in 1:48.98. On 1 September, the Romanian relay featuring Popovici on the leadoff leg, won the silver medal in the Mixed 4x100-metre freestyle event, with a time of 3:30.39, finishing 0.36 seconds behind the Hungarian relay. In his final event, Popovici swam in the 100-metre freestyle, winning his third gold medal, with a time of 47.13, 2.24 seconds ahead of silver medalist Jere Hribar.

==== 2022 World Short Course Championships ====
2022 World Championships (SC)
Silver medal – second place	200 m freestyle	1:40.79 (NR)

On day two of the 2022 World Short Course Championships in Melbourne, Australia, Popovici set a new world junior record in the semifinals of the 100-metre freestyle with a time of 45.91 seconds, which was 0.20 seconds faster than the former mark of 46.11 by Kliment Kolesnikov. The following day, he placed thirty-first in the 400-metre freestyle with a time of 3:58.48. In the final of the 100 metre freestyle, he set another world junior record with a personal best time of 45.64 seconds and placed fourth. His performances in the 100-metre freestyle made him the first junior swimmer in history to go under 46 seconds in the event. The sixth and final day, he won the silver medal in the 200-metre freestyle with a new Romanian record time of 1:40.79.

=== 2023 ===
==== 2023 World Championships ====
At the 2023 World Championships in Fukuoka, Popovici entered the Men's 100-metre freestyle and the Men's 200-metre freestyle events. Coming into the 200-metre freestyle event the favorite despite a season-best of just 1:45.49, Popovici was decent in the prelims, with a 1:45.86 time for third. He then led in the semis with a season-best time of 1:44.70. In the final, Popovici was out quick with a 23.74 at the 50-metre mark, under his world junior record pace by 0.36 seconds. He remained under the record pace at the half point with a 50.18 split. He then showed no signs of faltering at the 150-metre mark with a 26.60 to remain under his best pace, but disaster struck on the last fifty meters, coming home in a sluggish 28.12, which saw him passed by Matt Richards, Tom Dean, and Hwang Sun-woo. He finished in fourth, with a time of 1:44.90. In the 100-metre freestyle event he ranked sixth in the prelims with a time of 47.90, and fifth in the semis with a time of 47.66. In the final, he was third at the halfway mark, opening in 22.73. However, his 25.10 time in the final fifty meters meant that he ended up sixth, with a 47.83 seconds time.

==== 2023 European Short Course Championships ====
2023 European Championships (SC)
Bronze medal – third place	100 m freestyle	46.05

In December, he entered to compete at the 2023 European Short Course Championships, in Otopeni, Romania. On 5 December, he swum in the Men's 4x50-metre Freestyle relay final, alongside Alexandru Stoica, Mihai Gergely and Patrick Dinu. While the 1:25.93 time set by the Romanians was only enough for seventh, his 21.30 time in the relay represented a new national record. On 8 December, he placed third in the morning prelims of the Men's 200-metre Freestyle event, with a time of 1:42.39. Later that evening, he ranked first overall in the semifinals, with a 1:42.04 time. On the morning of 9 December, he swum in the prelims of the Men's 100-metre Freestyle event, clocking a 46.70 time to qualify for the semifinals in second. In the final of the 200-metre freestyle that evening, he came in fourth with a time of 1:41.52, despite touching first at the 25-metre mark and second at the 50-metre mark. Two hours later, he entered the pool again for the semis of the 100-metre freestyle event, qualifying for the final in sixth, with a 46.48 seconds time. The final of the 100-metre freestyle event took place on 10 December. Although he had a slow start; touching only seventh at the final turn, Popovici was the quickest in the final twenty-five meters, managing to finish in third with a 46.05 time, 0.02 seconds ahead of Matt Richards who came in fourth.

== Personal life ==
Popovici grew up idolizing Michael Phelps and Ian Thorpe. He also stated that he is inspired by Floyd Mayweather, following Mayweather's training methods and the way he motivated himself. In December 2021, Popovici signed an endorsement deal with Arena. In July 2022, Popovici was awarded the Order of the Star of Romania, the highest civil order in the nation, by the Romanian president Klaus Iohannis. In May 2023, Popovici donated one of the gold medals he won at the 2022 World Championships to charity, having it melted into little golden ribbons that were gifted as a sign of hope for children diagnosed with cancer. He also became an ambassador for the organization Hope and Homes Romania in April, which helps children get out of orphanages by finding them families to live with. In 2023, Popovici was named Omega's Swimming Brand Ambassador. In July 2023, he enrolled at the University of Bucharest to study Psychology, but in autumn 2024, he transferred to the Faculty of Sociology and Social Work, where he now studies Social Work.

He also provided the Romanian voice of Druig in Eternals, chosen by Disney Character Voices International, Inc.

== Personal bests ==
=== Long course metres (50 m pool) ===
Event	Time	Meet	Location	Date	Age	Notes	Ref
50 m freestyle	21.83	2025 Romanian National Championships	Otopeni, Romania	9 April 2025	20	NR	
100 m freestyle	46.51	2025 World Aquatics Championships	Singapore	31 July 2025	20	ER	
200 m freestyle	1:42.97	2022 European Aquatics Championships	Rome, Italy	15 August 2022	17	WJ, NR	
400 m freestyle	3:47.54	2024 Romanian National Championships	Otopeni, Romania	19 April 2024	19		

Legend: WR – World record; ER – European record; NR – Romanian record; e – equalled existing record; WJ – World Junior record;
Records not set in finals: h – heat; sf – semifinal; r – relay 1st leg; rh – relay heat 1st leg; b – B final; † – en route to final mark; so – swim-off; tt – time trial

=== Short course metres (25 m pool) ===
Event	Time		Meet	Location	Date	Age	Notes	Ref
50 m freestyle	21.30	r	2023 European Short Course Championships	Otopeni, Romania	5 December 2023	19	NR	
100 m freestyle	45.64		2022 World Short Course Championships	Melbourne, Australia	15 December 2022	18	WJ, NR	
200 m freestyle	1:40.79		2022 World Short Course Championships	Melbourne, Australia	18 December 2022	18	NR	

Legend: NR – Romanian record; e – equalled existing record; WJ – World Junior record;
Records not set in finals: h – heat; sf – semifinal; r – relay 1st leg; rh – relay heat 1st leg; b – B final; † – en route to final mark; so – swim-off; tt – time trial

== Records ==
=== World records ===
==== Long course metres (50 m pool) ====
No.	Event	Time	Meet	Location	Date	Age	Status	Notes	Ref
1	100 m freestyle	46.86	2022 European Aquatics Championships	Rome, Italy	13 August 2022	17 years, 332 days	Former	WJ	

Legend: e – equalled existing record; WJ – World Junior record;
Records not set in finals: h – heat; sf – semifinal; r – relay 1st leg; rh – relay heat 1st leg; b – B final; † – en route to final mark; so – swim-off; tt – time trial

=== Continental records ===
==== Long course metres (50 m pool) ====
No.	Event	Time		Meet	Location	Date	Age	Status	Notes	Ref
1	100 m freestyle	46.98	sf	2022 European Aquatics Championships	Rome, Italy	12 August 2022	17	Former	Former WJ	
2	100 m freestyle (2)	46.86		2022 European Aquatics Championships	Rome, Italy	13 August 2022	17	Former	WJ, Former WR	
3	100 m freestyle (3)	46.71		2025 European U-23 Swimming Championships	Šamorín, Slovakia	28 June 2025	20	Former		
4	100 m freestyle (4)	46.51		2025 World Aquatics Championships	Singapore	31 July 2025	20	Current		

Legend: WR – World record; e – equalled existing record; WJ – World Junior record;
Records not set in finals: h – heat; sf – semifinal; r – relay 1st leg; rh – relay heat 1st leg; b – B final; † – en route to final mark; so – swim-off; tt – time trial

=== World junior records ===
==== Long course metres (50 m pool) ====
No.	Event	Time		Meet	Location	Date	Age	Status	Notes	Ref
1	100 m freestyle	47.56	r	2021 European Junior Championships	Rome, Italy	6 July 2021	16	Former	Former NR	
2	100 m freestyle (2)	47.30		2021 European Junior Championships	Rome, Italy	8 July 2021	16	Former	Former NR	
3	200 m freestyle	1:44.40	sf	2022 World Aquatics Championships	Budapest, Hungary	19 June 2022	17	Former	Former NR	
4	200 m freestyle (2)	1:43.21		2022 World Aquatics Championships	Budapest, Hungary	20 June 2022	17	Former	Former NR	
5	100 m freestyle (3)	47.13	sf	2022 World Aquatics Championships	Budapest, Hungary	21 June 2022	17	Former	Former NR	
6	100 m freestyle (4)	46.98	sf	2022 European Aquatics Championships	Rome, Italy	12 August 2022	17	Former	Former ER	
7	100 m freestyle (5)	46.86		2022 European Aquatics Championships	Rome, Italy	13 August 2022	17	Current	Former WR	
8	200 m freestyle (3)	1:42.97		2022 European Aquatics Championships	Rome, Italy	15 August 2022	17	Current	NR	

Legend: WR – World record; ER – European record; NR – Romanian record; e – equalled existing record;
Records not set in finals: h – heat; sf – semifinal; r – relay 1st leg; rh – relay heat 1st leg; b – B final; † – en route to final mark; so – swim-off; tt – time trial

==== Short course metres (25 m pool) ====
No.	Event	Time		Meet	Location	Date	Age	Status	Notes	Ref
1	100 m freestyle	45.91	sf	2022 World Short Course Championships	Melbourne, Australia	14 December 2022	18	Former	Former NR	
2	100 m freestyle (2)	45.64		2022 World Short Course Championships	Melbourne, Australia	15 December 2022	18	Current	NR	

Legend: NR – Romanian record; e – equalled existing record;
Records not set in finals: h – heat; sf – semifinal; r – relay 1st leg; rh – relay heat 1st leg; b – B final; † – en route to final mark; so – swim-off; tt – time trial

== Awards ==
- Swimming World, Newcomer of the Year: 2021
- Piotr Nurowski Award: 2021
- Swimming World, Swimmer of the Year (male): 2022
- SwimSwam Swammy Award Male Swimmer of the Year: 2022
- SwimSwam Swammy Award European Male Swimmer of the Year: 2022
- SwimSwam Swammy Award World Junior Male Swimmer of the Year: 2022
- LEN Award, European Male Swimmer of the Year: 2022
- Gazeta Sporturilor, Romanian Athlete of the Year: 2022
- BTA, Balkan Athlete of the Year: 2022
- European Aquatics Athlete of the Year (Men's): 2022, 2025

Records
Preceded by César Cielo	Men's 100-metre freestyle world record-holder (long course); 13 August 2022 – 11 February 2024	Succeeded by Pan Zhanle
