= Jere Hribar =

Croatian swimmer (born 2004)

Personal information
- National team: Croatia
- Born: 19 January 2004 (age 22) Split, Croatia
- Height: 2.03 m (6 ft 8 in)

Sport
- Sport: Swimming
- Strokes: Freestyle
- College team: LSU Tigers
Medal record
Men's swimming
Representing Croatia
Event	1st	2nd	3rd
European Championships (LC)	0	0	1
European Championships (SC)	1	1	1
World Junior Championships	0	1	1
European Junior Championships	0	0	1
Total	1	2	4
European Championships (LC)
Bronze medal – third place	2026 Paris	4×100 m freestyle
European Championships (SC)
Gold medal – first place	2025 Lublin	50 m freestyle
Silver medal – second place	2025 Lublin	100 m freestyle
Bronze medal – third place	2025 Lublin	4×50 m freestyle
World Junior Championships
Silver medal – second place	2022 Lima	100 m freestyle
Bronze medal – third place	2022 Lima	50 m freestyle
European U-23 Championships
Silver medal – second place	2025 Samorin	100 m freestyle
European Junior Championships
Silver medal – second place	2022 Otopeni	50 m freestyle

Jere Hribar (born 19 January 2004) is a Croatian competitive swimmer. He is the 2022 World Junior Championships silver medalist in the 100-metre freestyle and bronze medalist in the 50-metre freestyle. At the 2022 European Junior Championships, he won the gold medal in the 50-metre freestyle. Hribar also competed for Croatia at the 2024 Summer Olympics in the men's 50-metre freestyle event.

== Background ==
Hribar was born 19 January 2004 in Croatia. In the autumn of 2022, he committed to attending Louisiana State University for college and competing for the LSU Tigers swim team beginning in the autumn of 2023.

== Career ==
=== 2021–2022 ===
At the 2021 European Junior Swimming Championships, held in July in Rome, Italy, Hribar helped an achieve a seventh-place finish in the final of the 4×100-metre freestyle relay, swimming the first leg of the relay in 51.00 seconds to contribute to the final time of 3:22.64, and placed eighth in the final of the 50-metre freestyle with a time of 23.03 seconds and 21st in the preliminary heats of the 100-metre freestyle with a time of 51.22 seconds. The following year, at the 2022 European Junior Swimming Championships held in July in Otopeni, Romania, he swam a time of 50.44 seconds for the first leg of the 4×100-metre freestyle relay in the final before the second leg swimmer left early with a -0.04 reaction time and the final relay time of 3:21.63 was deemed ineligible by LEN officials and the relay results were disqualified. Day two of competition, he helped achieve an eighth-place finish and set a new Croatian record in the final of the 4×100-metre mixed freestyle relay, contributing a time of 50.27 seconds for the first leg of the relay to the final mark of 3:34.28. Two days later, he won the silver medal in the 50-metre freestyle with a time of 22.55 seconds in the final, after swimming a personal best time of 22.32 seconds in the preliminaries one day prior. In his final two events, he tied Davide Passafaro of Italy for eleventh-place in the semifinals of 100-metre freestyle with a time of 50.73 seconds on day five and was disqualified in the preliminaries of the 4×100-metre medley relay on day six.

==== 2022 World Junior Championships ====
2022 World Junior Championships
Silver medal – second place	100 m freestyle	49.37
Bronze medal – third place	50 m freestyle	22.55

Starting his competition on day three at the 2022 FINA World Junior Swimming Championships, held in August and September in Lima, Peru, Hribar ranked second in the morning preliminary heats of the 50-metre freestyle with a time 22.42 seconds and qualified for the semifinals. For the evening semifinals, he finished in a time of 22.35 seconds and qualified for the final ranking first. In the event final the following day, he finished 0.59 seconds behind Diogo Ribeiro of Portugal and 0.04 seconds behind Nikolas Antoniou of Cyprus with a time of 22.55 seconds to win the bronze medal. For the morning preliminary heats of his second and final event, the 100-metre freestyle, the following morning, he qualified for the semifinals with a time of 50.29 seconds and overall seventh-rank. He swam a 50.12 in the evening semifinals, qualifying for the final ranking third. In the final, he won the silver medal with a personal best time of 49.37 seconds, finishing 2.24 seconds behind gold medalist David Popovici of Romania and 0.54 seconds ahead of silver medalist Nikolas Antoniou.

==== 2022 Swimming World Cup ====
On the first day of the 2022 FINA Swimming World Cup in Berlin, Germany, Hribar swam a personal best time of 21.84 seconds in the preliminary heats of the 50-metre freestyle and placed 20th. Day two, he placed 30th in the preliminary heats of the 100-metre freestyle with a personal best time of 48.64 seconds, which was 2.18 seconds behind first-ranked Maxime Grousset of France. The third and final day, he achieved a third personal best time, this time in the 50-metre butterfly preliminary heats, where he placed 44th with a 24.14.

== International championships (50 m) ==
Meet	50 freestyle	100 freestyle	4×100 freestyle	4×100 medley	4×100 mixed freestyle
EJC 2021	8th	21st	7th		
EJC 2022	2nd place, silver medalist(s)	11th	DSQ	DSQ	8th
WJC 2022	3rd place, bronze medalist(s)	2nd place, silver medalist(s)			

== Personal best times ==
=== Long course metres (50 m pool) ===
Event	Time		Meet	Location	Date	Ref
50 m freestyle	22.32	h	2022 European Junior Championships	Otopeni, Romania	7 July 2022	
100 m freestyle	49.37		2022 World Junior Championships	Lima, Peru	4 September 2022	

Legend: h – preliminary heat

=== Short course metres (25 m pool) ===
Event	Time		Meet	Location	Date	Ref
50 m freestyle	21.84	h	2022 Swimming World Cup	Berlin, Germany	21 October 2022	
100 m freestyle	48.64	h	2022 Swimming World Cup	Berlin, Germany	22 October 2022	
50 m butterfly	24.14	h	2022 Swimming World Cup	Berlin, Germany	23 October 2022	

Legend: h – preliminary heat

== National records ==
=== Long course metres (50 m pool) ===
No.	Event	Time	Meet	Location	Date	Age	Status	Ref
1	4×100 m mixed freestyle	3:34.28	2022 European Junior Championships	Otopeni, Romania	6 July 2022	18	Current	

== Awards and honours ==
- Slobodna Dalmacija, Split Men's Best in Sport (Swimming): 2022
