= Sara Curtis =

Italian swimmer (born 2006)

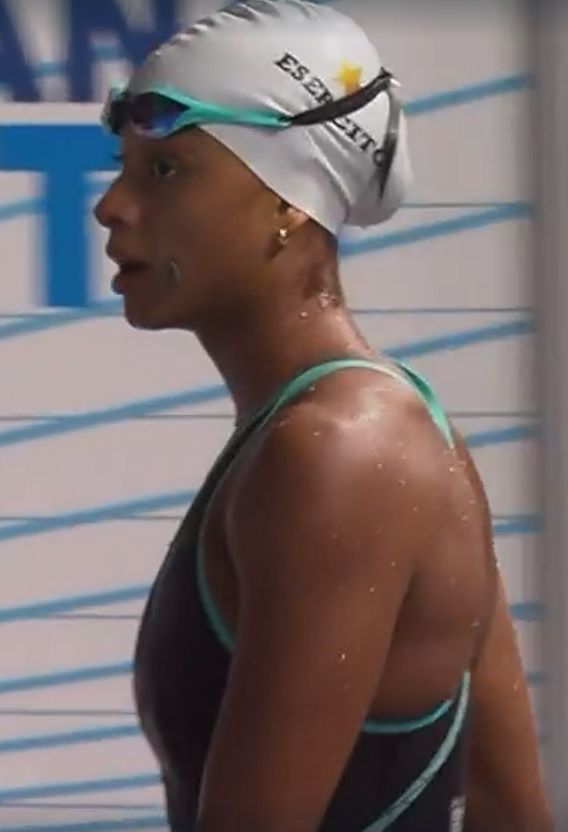
- Curtis at the 2025 Italian Spring Championships

Personal information
- National team: Italy
- Born: 19 August 2006 (age 20) Savigliano, Italy

Sport
- Sport: Swimming
- Strokes: Freestyle, backstroke
- Club: Team Dimensione Nuoto
- Coach: Thomas Maggiora
Medal record
Women's swimming
Representing Italy
| Event | 1st | 2nd | 3rd |
|---|---|---|---|
| World Championships (SC) | 1 | 0 | 0 |
| European Championships (LC) | 1 | 2 | 3 |
| European Championships (SC) | 3 | 2 | 2 |
| World Junior Championships | 0 | 3 | 1 |
| European Junior Championships | 6 | 1 | 2 |
| Total | 11 | 8 | 8 |
World Championships (SC)
| Gold medal – first place | 2024 Budapest | 4×50 m mixed freestyle |
European Championships (LC)
| Gold medal – first place | 2026 Paris | 50 m backstroke |
| Silver medal – second place | 2026 Paris | 4×100 m freestyle |
| Silver medal – second place | 2026 Paris | 4×100 m medley |
| Bronze medal – third place | 2026 Paris | 100 m freestyle |
| Bronze medal – third place | 2026 Paris | 4x100 m mixed freestyle |
| Bronze medal – third place | 2026 Paris | 50 m freestyle |
European Championships (SC)
| Gold medal – first place | 2025 Lublin | 50 m backstroke |
| Gold medal – first place | 2025 Lublin | 4×50 m mixed freestyle |
| Gold medal – first place | 2025 Lublin | 4×50 m mixed medley |
| Silver medal – second place | 2025 Lublin | 50 m freestyle |
| Silver medal – second place | 2025 Lublin | 4×50 m freestyle |
| Bronze medal – third place | 2025 Lublin | 100 m freestyle |
| Bronze medal – third place | 2025 Lublin | 4×50 m medley |
World Junior Championships
| Silver medal – second place | 2022 Lima | 50 m freestyle |
| Silver medal – second place | 2022 Lima | 4×100 m medley |
| Silver medal – second place | 2022 Lima | 4×100 m mixed medley |
| Bronze medal – third place | 2022 Lima | 50 m backstroke |
European Junior Championships
| Gold medal – first place | 2022 Otopeni | 4×100 m freestyle |
| Gold medal – first place | 2024 Vilnius | 50 m freestyle |
| Gold medal – first place | 2024 Vilnius | 100 m freestyle |
| Gold medal – first place | 2024 Vilnius | 50 m backstroke |
| Gold medal – first place | 2024 Vilnius | 4×100 m freestyle |
| Gold medal – first place | 2024 Vilnius | Mixed 4×100 m freestyle |
| Silver medal – second place | 2024 Vilnius | Mixed 4×100 m medley |
| Bronze medal – third place | 2022 Otopeni | 50 m freestyle |
| Bronze medal – third place | 2022 Otopeni | 4×100 m medley |

Sara Curtis (born 19 August 2006) is an Italian competitive swimmer specializing in sprint freestyle and backstroke events who is the long course world record holder in the 50 metre backstroke. At the 2022 World Junior Championships, she won silver medals in the 50-metre freestyle, 4×100-metre medley relay, and 4×100-metre mixed medley relay, a bronze medal in the 50-metre backstroke, and placed fourth in the 100-metre backstroke. At the 2022 European Junior Championships, she won a gold medal in the 4×100-metre freestyle relay and bronze medals in the 50-metre freestyle and the 4×100-metre medley relay.

== Background ==
Curtis was born on 19 August 2006 in Savigliano, in the province of Cuneo, to an Italian father and a Nigerian mother. She trains under the guidance of coach Thomas Maggiora with Team Dimensione Nuoto.

== Career ==
=== 2022 ===
==== 2022 European Junior Championships ====
At the 2022 European Junior Swimming Championships, in July in Otopeni, Romania, Curtis won a gold medal as part of the 4×100-metre freestyle relay, splitting a 56.50 for the third leg of the relay to contribute to a final time of 3:42.98. In the 50-metre freestyle, she won the bronze medal with a personal best time of 25.39 seconds, finishing 0.17 seconds behind gold medalist Nina Jazy of Germany and 0.05 seconds behind silver medalist Bianca Costea of Romania. For her other events, she won a bronze medal as part of the 4×100-metre medley relay, swimming the backstroke portion of the relay in the final with a personal best time of 1:01.92, placed fifth in the final of the 50-metre backstroke with a personal best time of 28.79 seconds, placed sixth in the final of the 100-metre backstroke with a 1:02.00, and placed 20th in the 100-metre freestyle with a time of 57.57 seconds.

Following her performances, Curtis competed at the 2022 Italian Junior National Championships in Ostia, winning the gold medal in the 50-metre freestyle with a Championships record of 25.40 seconds, gold medals in the 50-metre backstroke and 100-metre backstroke, and a silver medal in the 100-metre freestyle.

==== 2022 World Junior Championships ====
2022 World Junior Championships
| Silver medal – second place | 4×100 m mixed medley | 3:55.58 |
| Silver medal – second place | 50 m freestyle | 25.53 |
| Silver medal – second place | 4×100 m medley | 4:06.91 |
| Bronze medal – third place | 50 m backstroke | 28.93 |

On the second day of the 2022 FINA World Junior Swimming Championships, 31 August in Lima, Peru, Curtis placed fourth in her first final of the Championships, the 100-metre backstroke, with a time of 1:02.10, which was 0.70 seconds behind gold medalist Dóra Molnár of Hungary and 0.44 seconds ahead of fifth-place finisher Aissia Prisecariu of Romania. Later in the same session, she won her first medal of the Championships, a silver medal in the 4×100-metre mixed medley relay, contributing a 1:03.19 for the backstroke portion of the relay to the final time of 3:55.58. Three days later, she won her first individual medal, a bronze medal in the 50-metre backstroke, finishing 0.42 seconds behind gold medalist Lora Komoróczy of Hungary with a time of 28.93 seconds. The following day, she started the finals session with a silver medal in the 50-metre freestyle, finishing in a time of 25.53 seconds. She concluded with a 1:03.14 backstroke leg of the 4×100-metre medley relay in the final, helping finish second and win the silver medal with a time of 4:06.91. Her medals contributed to a record 20 total medals won by Italy at a single FINA World Junior Swimming Championships.

=== 2023 ===
In January 2023, Curtis achieved a pair of personal best times at the 23rd Luxembourg Euro Meet in Luxembourg, placing second in the final of the 50-metre freestyle with a time of 25.33 seconds, which was 0.15 seconds behind first-place finisher and fellow Italian Silvia Di Pietro, and fourth in the final of the 100-metre freestyle in 55.73 seconds.

In April, on day two of the 2023 Italian National Championships in Riccione, Curtis ranked as the fastest junior in the final of the 50-metre backstroke, placing sixth with a personal best and 2023 European Junior Swimming Championships qualifying time of 28.70 seconds. In the 100-metre freestyle final on day three, she achieved a personal best and European Junior Championships qualifying time of 55.12 seconds, which ranked as fifth across all ages and first amongst juniors (born 2005 or more recent) in the final. In the preliminaries of the 50-metre freestyle on day four, she qualified for the final ranking first with a personal best and Italian junior record time of 25.23 seconds, which was 0.01 seconds faster than the former record of 25.24 seconds by Giorgia Biondani from 2013 and 0.10 seconds faster than her previous personal best time. She improved the record and personal best time in the final, winning the senior national title with a 2023 World Junior Championships qualifying time of 25.14 seconds. It marked her first senior national title and an Italian cadet category record.

== International championships (50 m) ==
| Meet | 50 freestyle | 100 freestyle | 50 backstroke | 100 backstroke | 4×100 freestyle | 4×100 medley | 4×100 mixed medley |
|---|---|---|---|---|---|---|---|
| EJC 2022 | 3rd place, bronze medalist(s) | 20th | 5th | 6th | 1st place, gold medalist(s) | 3rd place, bronze medalist(s) | |
| WJC 2022 | 2nd place, silver medalist(s) | | 3rd place, bronze medalist(s) | 4th | | 2nd place, silver medalist(s) | 2nd place, silver medalist(s) |

== Personal best times ==
=== Long course metres (50 m pool) ===
| Event | Time | | Meet | Location | Date | Age | Ref |
|---|---|---|---|---|---|---|---|
| 50 m freestyle | 23.99 [NR] | f | 2026 European Aquatics Championships | Paris | 15 August 2026 | 19 | |
| 100 m freestyle | 52.69 [NR] | f | 2026 62° Trofeo Settecolli | Rome | 27 June 2026 | 18 | |
| 50 m backstroke | 26.56 [WR] | f | 2026 European Aquatics Championships | Paris | 13 August 2026 | 19 | |
| 100 m backstroke | 58.43 [NR] | r | 2026 European Aquatics Championships | Paris | 16 August 2026 | 19 | |

Legend: r – relay 1st leg; h – preliminary heat; f – final

== See also ==
- World record progression 50 metres backstroke
