= Nina Jazy =

German swimmer

Personal information
- Full name: Nina Sandrine Jazy
- National team: Germany
- Born: 25 November 2005 (age 20) Recklinghausen, Germany

Sport
- Sport: Swimming
- Strokes: Freestyle
- Club: SG Essen
Medal record
Women's swimming
Representing Germany
Event	1st	2nd	3rd
European Junior Championships	1	0	1
Total	1	0	1
European Championships (LC)
Silver medal – second place	2024 Belgrade	4×100 m mixed medley
Bronze medal – third place	2024 Belgrade	4 × 100 m mixed freestyle
European Junior Championships
Gold medal – first place	2022 Otopeni	50 m freestyle
Bronze medal – third place	2022 Otopeni	4×100 m freestyle

Nina Sandrine Jazy (born 25 November 2005) is a German competitive swimmer. She won the gold medal in the 50-metre freestyle and a bronze medal in the 4×100-metre freestyle relay at the 2022 European Junior Swimming Championships.

== Background ==
Jazy was born 25 November 2005 in Recklinghausen, Germany, and competes as part of the SG Essen swim club. She formerly competed for SG Dortmund.

== Career ==
=== 2021–2022 ===
At the 2021 European Junior Swimming Championships, held in July in Rome, Italy, Jazy competed in four events, placing eighth in the 50-metre freestyle, 24th in the 100-metre freestyle, sixth in the 4×100-metre freestyle relay, and sixth in the 4×100-metre mixed freestyle relay. In September, she won three medals at the 2021 German Short Course National Championships in Wuppertal when she was 15 years old, including a silver medal in the 50-metre freestyle with a personal best time of 24.84 seconds. In April the following year, she was named to Team Germany for the 2022 European Junior Swimming Championships, held in July in Otopeni, Romania. Two months later, she won the gold medal and national title in the 50-metre freestyle with a personal best time of 25.23 seconds at the German Championships. Two days earlier, she achieved a personal best time of 55.62 seconds for the 100-metre freestyle, swimming the time on the lead-off leg of the 4×100-metre freestyle relay.

==== 2022 European Junior Championships ====
2022 European Junior Championships
Gold medal – first place	50 m freestyle	25.22
Bronze medal – third place	4×100 m freestyle	3:45.63

As a 16-year-old at the 2022 European Junior Swimming Championships, Jazy won her first medal on the first day of competition, anchoring the 4×100-metre freestyle relay to a bronze medal-win in 3:45.63 with a split time of 54.65 seconds. The second medal she won was a gold medal in the 50-metre freestyle, where she finished first with a personal best time of 25.22 seconds. Her time was less than two-tenths of a second faster than silver medallist Bianca Costea of Romania and bronze medallist Sara Curtis of Italy. In her other events, she placed sixth in the 4×200-metre freestyle relay, leading off the finals relay with a 2:08.20, and placed thirteenth in the 100-metre freestyle with a time of 56.76 seconds.

In the autumn following the Championships, Jazy competed at the 2022 FINA Swimming World Cup in October in Berlin, placing seventeenth in the 100-metre freestyle with a personal best time of 54.44 seconds, which was 0.97 seconds faster than her former personal best time of 55.41 seconds. The following month, and before her seventeenth birthday on the twenty-fifth, she set a German junior record in the 50-metre freestyle at the 2022 German Short Course Championships, winning the silver medal with her time of 24.53 seconds. She also lowered her personal best time in the 100-metre freestyle by 0.60 seconds with a time of 53.84 seconds for the silver medal.

=== 2023 ===
In early February 2023, at the German Team Championships conducted in short course metres in Essen, 17-year-old Jazy lowered her German junior record in the 50-metre freestyle with a personal best time of 24.50 seconds. In early March, World Aquatics increased its age cut-off for female junior swimmers from 17 to 18 years of age at the end of the year, making her age-eligible for world junior records through the end of the 2023 year and the 2023 World Junior Swimming Championships.

== International championships (50 m) ==
Meet	50 free	100 free	4×100 free	4×200 free	4×100 mixed free
EJC 2021	8th	24th	6th		6th
EJC 2022	1st place, gold medalist(s)	13th	3rd place, bronze medalist(s)	6th	

== Personal best times ==
=== Long course metres (50 m pool) ===
Event	Time		Meet	Location	Date	Age	Ref
50 m freestyle	25.22		2022 European Junior Swimming Championships	Otopeni, Romania	7 July 2022	16	
100 m freestyle	55.62	r	2022 German Championships	Berlin	23 June 2022	16	

Legend: r – relay 1st leg

=== Short course metres (25 m pool) ===
Event	Time	Meet	Location	Date	Age	Ref
50 m freestyle	24.50	2022 German Team Championships	Essen	4 February 2023	17	
100 m freestyle	53.84	2022 German Short Course Championships	Wuppertal	17 November 2022	16	

== Awards and honours ==
- Sparkasse Essen, Essen Newcomer of the Year: 2022
