= Uroš Živanović =

Serbian swimmer

Personal information
- National team: Serbia
- Born: 30 June 2005 (age 21) Serbia and Montenegro

Sport
- Sport: Swimming
- Strokes: Breaststroke, freestyle
- Club: Dubočica
Medal record
Men's swimming
Representing Serbia
Event	1st	2nd	3rd
World Junior Championships	1	1	0
European Junior Championships	0	0	1
Total	1	1	1
World Junior Championships
Gold medal – first place	2022 Lima	50 m breaststroke
Silver medal – second place	2022 Lima	100 m breaststroke
European Junior Championships
Bronze medal – third place	2022 Otopeni	50 m breaststroke

Uroš Živanović (born 30 June 2005) is a Serbian competitive swimmer. He won the world junior title and gold medal in the 50-metre breaststroke and the silver medal in the 100-metre breaststroke at the 2022 World Junior Championships. At the 2022 European Junior Championships, he won the bronze medal in the 50-metre breaststroke.

== Background ==
Živanović was born 30 June 2005 in Serbia. He attends Gimnazija in Leskovac. He trains with and competes for swim club Dubočica.

== Career ==
=== 2021–2022 ===
In July 2021, at the 2021 European Junior Swimming Championships, held in Rome, Italy, Živanović placed ninth in the 50-metre breaststroke with a time of 28.31 seconds, ninth in the 100-metre breaststroke with a time of 1:02.56, twelfth in the 4×100-metre mixed freestyle relay, 57th in the 50-metre butterfly with a 26.92, and 72nd in the 50-metre freestyle with a time of 24.72 seconds. At the 2022 European Junior Swimming Championships, held the following July in Otopeni, Romania, he won the bronze medal with a time of 27.69 seconds after swimming a personal best time of 27.64 seconds in the semifinals. In the 200-metre breaststroke, he swam a personal best time of 2:18.86 in the preliminary heats before placing fourteenth overall in the semifinals with a 2:19.25. In his third event of the Championships, the 100-metre breaststroke, he placed fourth with a time of 1:01.85, finishing 0.53 seconds behind bronze medalist Steijn Louter of the Netherlands.

==== 2022 European Aquatics Championships ====
Živanović qualified for the 2022 European Aquatics Championships, contested starting 11 August at Foro Italico in Rome, Italy, in the 100-metre breaststroke and also entered to compete in the 50-metre breaststroke, 50-metre freestyle, and 100-metre freestyle. The first day of competition, he placed 33rd in the 100-metre breaststroke with a time of 1:03.00. On the second day, he finished in a personal best time of 52.10 seconds in the 100-metre freestyle preliminary heats to place 67th overall. Day four, he split a 50.59 for the anchor leg of the 4×100-metre freestyle relay to help place twelfth with a time of 3:18.15 in the preliminary heats. In the 50-metre breaststroke preliminary heats on day five, he placed 32nd overall with a time of 28.47 seconds. For his final event, he placed 66th in the 50-metre freestyle preliminary heats on day six with a personal best time of 23.98 seconds.

==== 2022 World Junior Championships ====
2022 World Junior Championships
Gold medal – first place	50 m breaststroke	27.70
Silver medal – second place	100 m breaststroke	1:01.64

On day one of competition at the 2022 FINA World Junior Swimming Championships in Lima, Peru, Živanović ranked fourth in the preliminaries of the 100-metre breaststroke with a 1:02.64 and advanced to the semifinals. In the evening semifinals, he lowered his time to a 1:02.46 and qualified for the final ranking seconds. For the final the following day, he achieved a personal best time of 1:01.64 and won the silver medal, finishing 0.34 seconds behind gold medalist Luka Mladenovic of Austria. Three days later, he finished in a time of 28.30 seconds in the preliminary heats of the 50-metre breaststroke, advancing to the semifinals ranking first. Lowering his time to a 28.08 in the semifinals later in the day, he ranked first and qualified for the final. In the final the next day, he won the gold medal with a time of 27.70 seconds, which was over five-tenths of a second ahead of silver medalist Alex Sabattani of Italy and bronze medalist Luka Mladenovic. Returning home to Leskovac following his performances, he received a welcome reception at his school, Gimnazija, which included the director of the school.

==== 2022 Swimming World Cup ====
At the 2022 FINA Swimming World Cup conducted in short course metres (25-metre pool) in October in Berlin, Germany, Živanović placed seventeenth in the 200-metre breaststrkoe with a 2:14.38, nineteenth in the 100-metre breaststroke with a 1:00.31, twenty-first in the 50-metre breaststroke with a time of 27.56 seconds (1.12 seconds behind preliminary heats first-ranked Nicolò Martinenghi of Italy), thirty-ninth in the 100-metre individual medley with a 57.28, and ninety-sixth in the 100-metre freestyle with a time of 51.12 seconds.

== International championships (50 m) ==
Meet	50 free	100 free	50 breast	100 breast	200 breast	50 fly	4×100 free	4×100 mixed free
Junior level
EJC 2021	72nd		9th	9th		57th		12th
EJC 2022			3rd place, bronze medalist(s)	4th	14th			
WJC 2022			1st place, gold medalist(s)	2nd place, silver medalist(s)				
Senior level
EC 2022	66th	67th	32nd	33rd			12th	

== Personal best times ==
=== Long course metres (50 m pool) ===
Event	Time		Meet	Location	Date	Ref
50 m freestyle	23.98	h	2022 European Aquatics Championships	Rome, Italy	16 August 2022	
100 m freestyle	52.10	h	2022 European Aquatics Championships	Rome, Italy	12 August 2022	
50 m breaststroke	27.64	sf	2022 European Junior Championships	Otopeni, Romania	5 July 2022	
100 m breaststroke	1:01.64		2022 World Junior Championships	Lima, Peru	31 August 2022	
200 m breaststroke	2:18.86	h	2022 European Junior Championships	Otopeni, Romania	7 July 2022	

Legend: h – preliminary heat; sf – semifinal

=== Short course metres (25 m pool) ===
Event	Time	Meet	Location	Date	Ref
50 m breaststroke	27.33	Prevstvo Srbije za kadete	Zrenjanin	4 December 2021	
100 m breaststroke	59.74	Prevstvo Srbije za kadete	Zrenjanin	5 December 2021	
100 m individual medley	55.86	Prevstvo Srbije za kadete	Zrenjanin	4 December 2021	
