= Patrick Dinu =

Romanian swimmer (born 2005)

Personal information
- Full name: Patrick Sebastian Dinu
- National team: Romania
- Born: 12 June 2005 (age 21) Constanța, Romania

Sport
- Sport: Swimming
- Strokes: Freestyle
- Club: CSM Constanța (current), CS Farul Constanța (former)
- Coach: Răzvan Florea
Medal record
Men's swimming
Representing Romania
Event	1st	2nd	3rd
World Junior Championships	1	1	0
European Junior Championships	1	2	0
Total	2	3	0
World Junior Championships
Gold medal – first place	2022 Lima	4×100 m freestyle
Silver medal – second place	2022 Lima	4×100 m mixed freestyle
European Junior Championships
Gold medal – first place	2022 Otopeni	4×100 m freestyle
Silver medal – second place	2021 Rome	4×100 m freestyle
Silver medal – second place	2022 Otopeni	4×100 m mixed freestyle

Patrick Sebastian Dinu (born 12 June 2005) is a Romanian competitive swimmer specializing in sprint freestyle events. At the 2022 World Junior Championships, he won a gold medal in the 4×100-metre freestyle relay, a silver medal in the 4×100-metre mixed freestyle relay, and placed fifth in the final of the 100-metre freestyle. He is a gold medalist in the 4×100-metre freestyle relay at the European Junior Championships in 2022 and silver medalist in 2021, as well as a silver medalist in the 4×100-metre mixed freestyle relay and in 2022.

== Background ==
Dinu was born 12 June 2005 and started competitive swimming at six years of age as part of the Atena Sport Club Constanța. He is coached by Olympian, and fellow Romanian, Răzvan Florea and formerly trained with and competed for CS Farul Constanța. He currently trains and competes with the swim club as part of the Club Sportiv Municipal Constanța (CSM Constanța).

== Career ==
=== 2021–2022 ===
As part of the 4×100-metre freestyle relay at the 2021 European Junior Swimming Championships, held in July in Rome, Italy, Dinu swam a time of 51.04 seconds for the anchor leg of the relay, contributing to a final time of 3:19.93, and helping win the silver medal. In his other events at the Championships, he placed 31st in the 100-metre freestyle with a 51.45, 42nd in the 50-metre breaststroke with a time of 30.04 seconds, and 51st in the 50-metre freestyle with a 24.08. The following year, he lowered his split time in the 4×100-metre freestyle relay to a 49.72 at the 2022 European Junior Swimming Championships, held in July in Otopeni, helping win the gold medal with a final time of 3:18.93. In the 4×100-metre mixed freestyle relay, he won a silver medal, splitting a 50.03 for the second leg of the relay to help finish second in a Romanian record time of 3:29.35. In the 100-metre freestyle, he placed tenth in the semifinals with a time of 50.72 seconds and in the 50-metre freestyle, he placed 26th with a time of 23.50 seconds.

==== 2022 European Aquatics Championships ====
For the 2022 European Aquatics Championships, with pool swimming competition held in August at Foro Italico in Rome, Italy, Dinu qualified to compete in both the 100-metre freestyle individual event and the 4×100-metre freestyle relay. In the preliminary heats of the 100-metre freestyle on the second day of competition, he placed 53rd overall with a time of 50.59 seconds and did not advance to the semifinals. Two days later, he helped place eleventh in the 4×100-metre freestyle relay, contributing a split time of 50.20 seconds for the third leg of the relay to the final time of 3:17.94.

==== 2022 World Junior Championships ====
2022 World Junior Championships
Gold medal – first place	4×100 m freestyle	3:18.84
Silver medal – second place	4×100 m mixed freestyle	3:30.39

At the 2022 FINA World Junior Swimming Championships, held in August and September 2022 in Lima, Peru, Dinu entered to compete in two individual events, the 50-metre freestyle and the 100-metre freestyle, and Romania announced relay teams for the 4×100-metre freestyle relay and 4×100-metre mixed freestyle relay. On the first day of competition, he split a 49.50 for the anchor leg of the 4×100-metre freestyle relay in the final, helping finish first in a time of 3:18.84 to win the gold medal. Two days later, he placed fourteenth in the semifinals of the 50-metre freestyle with a time of 23.41 seconds after swimming a personal best time of 23.31 seconds in the preliminary heats. In his second event of the day, the 4×100-metre mixed freestyle relay, he contributed a split time of 50.17 seconds for the second leg of the relay, helping win the silver medal in a time of 3:30.39. For his final event, he placed fifth in the final of the 100-metre freestyle on the sixth and final day of competition with a personal best time of 50.09 seconds, finishing 2.96 seconds behind gold medalist and fellow Romanian David Popovici after advancing to the final from the semifinals with a time of 50.22 seconds.

Later in the year, in December at the 2022 Rotterdam Qualification Meet in Rotterdam, Netherlands, Dinu improved his personal best times in the 100 metre freestyle to a 50.05 in the a-final to place sixth and in the 50 metre freestyle to a 23.19 in the preliminaries to qualify for the b-final.

=== 2023 ===
As a 17-year-old at the 2023 Romanian Championships in Otopeni in April, Dinu won a youth national title and senior bronze medal in the 50-metre breaststroke with a personal best time of 28.71 seconds and helped win the national title in the 4×100-metre freestyle relay with a Romanian club record time of 3:22.17 as part of the CSM Constanța relay team. He also won youth national titles and senior bronze medals in the 50-metre freestyle and the 100-metre freestyle as well as senior national titles in the 4×100-metre mixed freestyle relay and 4×100-metre mixed medley relay.

== International championships (50 m) ==
Meet	50 freestyle	100 freestyle	50 breaststroke	4×100 freestyle	4×100 mixed freestyle
Junior level
EJC 2021	51st	31st	42nd	2nd place, silver medalist(s)	
EJC 2022	26th	10th		1st place, gold medalist(s)	2nd place, silver medalist(s)
WJC 2022	14th	5th		1st place, gold medalist(s)	2nd place, silver medalist(s)
Senior level
EC 2022		53rd		11th	

== Personal best times ==
=== Long course metres (50 m pool) ===
Event	Time		Meet	Location	Date	Age	Ref
50 m freestyle	23.19	h	2022 Rotterdam Qualification Meet	Rotterdam, Netherlands	4 December 2022	17	
100 m freestyle	50.05		2022 Rotterdam Qualification Meet	Rotterdam, Netherlands	3 December 2022	17	
50 m breaststroke	28.71		2023 Romanian Championships	Otopeni	7 April 2023	17	

== National records ==
=== Long course metres (50 m pool) ===
No.	Event	Time	Meet	Location	Date	Age	Type	Status	Ref
1	4×200 m freestyle	7:28.43	2022 Multinations Junior Swimming Meet	Kranj, Slovenia	9 April 2022	16 years, 301 days	National	Current	
2	4×100 m mixed freestyle	3:29.35	2022 European Junior Championships	Otopeni	6 July 2022	17 years, 24 days	National	Current	
3	4×100 m freestyle	3:22.17	2023 Romanian Championships	Otopeni	7 April 2023	17 years, 299 days	Club (CSM Constanța)	Current	
