= Luka Mladenovic =

Austrian swimmer

Personal information
- National team: Austria
- Born: 27 May 2004 (age 22) Austria

Sport
- Sport: Swimming
- Strokes: Breaststroke, individual medley
- Club: SU Generali Salzburg
- Coach: Bob Bowman Trainer University of Texas>
Medal record
Men's swimming
Representing Austria
Event	1st	2nd	3rd
European Championships (LC)	0	0	1
European Championships (SC)	0	0	2
World Junior Championships	1	1	1
European Junior Championships	0	1	0
European U23 Championships	3	0	0
Total	4	2	4
European Championships (LC)
Bronze medal – third place	2026 Paris	200 m breaststroke
European Championships (SC)
Bronze medal – third place	2025 Lublin	100 m breaststroke
Bronze medal – third place	2025 Lublin	200 m breaststroke
World Junior Championships
Gold medal – first place	2022 Lima	100 m breaststroke
Silver medal – second place	2022 Lima	200 m breaststroke
Bronze medal – third place	2022 Lima	50 m breaststroke
European Junior Championships
Silver medal – second place	2022 Otopeni	200 m breaststroke
European U23 Championships
Gold medal – first place	2025 Samorin	50 m breaststroke
Gold medal – first place	2025 Samorin	100 m breaststroke
Gold medal – first place	2025 Samorin	200 m breaststroke

Luka Mladenovic (born 27 May 2004) is an Austrian competitive swimmer. At the 2022 World Junior Championships, he won the gold medal and world junior title in the 100-metre breaststroke, the silver medal in the 200-metre breaststroke, and the bronze medal in the 50-metre breaststroke. He is a 2022 European Junior Championships silver medalist in the 200-metre breaststroke.

As of 2026, Luka Mladenovic is a student of the University of Texas in Austin, United States of America. His head coach is Bob Bowman.

== Background ==
Mladenovic was born 27 May 2004 in Austria. He trains with SU Generali Salzburg swim club, in Salzburg, under the guidance of coach Plamen Ryaskov.

== Career ==
=== 2021 ===
On 17 May, Mladenovic placed 61st in the 100-metre breaststroke with a time of 1:03.10 at the 2020 European Aquatics Championships, contested at Danube Arena in Budapest, Hungary. Two days later, he placed 41st in the 200-metre breaststroke with a time of 2:16.87. At the 2021 European Junior Swimming Championships, held approximately two months later in Italy, Rome, he placed fourth in the 100-metre breaststroke, fourth in the 200-metre breaststroke, eleventh in the 4×100-metre medley relay, seventeenth in the 4×100-metre mixed medley relay, 53rd in the 50-metre butterfly, and did not start the 50-metre breaststroke.

=== 2022 ===
==== 2022 European Junior Championships ====
At the 2022 European Junior Swimming Championships, held in July in Otopeni, Romania, Mladenovic won the silver medal in the 200-metre breaststroke with a time of 2:13.21, finishing less than two-tenths of a second behind gold medalist Lucien Vergnes of France. He also placed seventh in the final of the 100-metre breaststroke with a 1:02.48, placed seventh in the 200-metre individual medley in the semifinals with a personal best time of 2:03.79 before withdrawing from competing in the final, and placed fifteenth in the 50-metre breaststroke with a time of 28.68 seconds.

==== 2022 European Aquatics Championships ====
At the 2022 European Aquatics Championships, with pool swimming competition at Foro Italico in mid-August, Mladenovic started off with a 30th-place ranking in the preliminary heats of the 100-metre breaststroke on day one with a time of 1:02.46. Two days later, he achieved a 23rd-place ranking in the 200-metre breaststroke with a time of 2:15.98, which was the fastest time by an Austrian in the event at the 2022 Championships. On 15 August, two days later, he ranked 40th in the preliminary heats of the 50-metre breaststroke with a time of 29.06 seconds and did not advance to the semifinals. For his final event of the championships, he placed 19th in the preliminary heats of the 200-metre individual medley one day later with a 2:06.00, ranking as the fastest Austrian in the event.

==== 2022 World Junior Championships ====
2022 World Junior Championships
Gold medal – first place	100 m breaststroke	1:01.30
Silver medal – second place	200 m breaststroke	2:12.94
Bronze medal – third place	50 m breaststroke	28.32

Following his results at the 2022 European Junior Swimming Championships, Mladenovic entered to compete the same repertoire, 50-metre breaststroke, 100-metre breaststroke, 200-metre breaststroke, and 200-metre individual medley, at the 2022 FINA World Junior Swimming Championships, held in August and September in Lima, Peru. On the morning of the second day of competition, he placed twelfth in the 200-metre individual medley, finishing with a time of 2:04.90. Later in the day, in the evening finals session, he won the gold medal in the 100-metre breaststroke with a personal best time of 1:01.30, finishing 0.34 seconds ahead of silver medalist Uroš Živanović of Serbia and 1.50 seconds ahead of Filip Urbanski of Poland. Two days later, he won the silver medal in the 200-metre breaststroke, achieving a second-place finish with a personal best time of 2:12.94, which was 0.13 seconds behind gold medalist Asahi Kawashima of Japan. In the final of his fourth and final event, the 50-metre breaststroke on 4 September, he won the bronze medal in the 50-metre breaststroke, this time finishing 0.62 seconds behind gold medalist Uroš Živanović of Serbia with a personal best time of 28.32 seconds. After the Championships, when he returned to his training base in Austria, Mladenovic received a welcome home reception at his swim club.

=== 2023 ===
At the 2023 Salzburg Indoor Short Course Swimming Championships in February in Hallein, Mladenovic won ten titles in individual events, which spanned freestyle (100-metre, 200-metre, 400-metre), backstroke (100-metre), breaststroke (50-metre, 100-metre, 200-metre), butterfly (50-metre), and individual medley (100-metre, 200-metre) disciplines. Three months later, he placed fifth in the a-final of the 200-metre breaststroke at the 2023 Mare Nostrum stop in Canet-en-Roussillon, France, finishing in a time of 2:14.49.

== International championships (50 m) ==
Meet	50 breaststroke	100 breaststroke	200 breaststroke	50 butterfly	200 medley	4×100 medley	4×100 mixed medley
Junior level
EJC 2021	DNS	4th	4th	53rd		11th	17th
EJC 2022	15th	7th	2nd place, silver medalist(s)		7th (sf, WD)		
WJC 2022	3rd place, bronze medalist(s)	1st place, gold medalist(s)	2nd place, silver medalist(s)		12th		
Senior level
EC 2020		61st	41st				
EC 2022	40th	30th	23rd		19th		

== Personal best times ==
=== Long course meters (50 m pool) ===
Event	Time		Meet	Location	Date	Ref
50 m breaststroke	28.32		2022 World Junior Championships	Lima, Peru	4 September 2022	
100 m breaststroke	1:01.30		2022 World Junior Championships	Lima, Peru	31 August 2022	
200 m breaststroke	2:12.94		2022 World Junior Championships	Lima, Peru	2 September 2022	
200 m individual medley	2:03.79	sf	2022 European Junior Championships	Otopeni, Romania	6 July 2022	
