= 2022 FINA World Junior Swimming Championships =

Eighth iteration of the World Junior Swimming Championships

- Host city: Lima, Peru
- Date: 30 August – 4 September 2022
- Venue: Videna Aquatic Center
- Nations: 87
- Athletes: 509

The 8th FINA World Junior Swimming Championships were held from 30 August to 4 September 2022 at the Videna Aquatic Center in Lima, Peru. It was open to competition for girls ages 14 to 17 years old and boys ages 15 to 18 years old at the end of the 2022 calendar year. All events were conducted in a 50-metre (long course) pool.

Originally the competition was planned for 24–29 August 2021; however, the COVID-19 pandemic resulted in its postponement to 24–29 August 2022. In April 2022, FINA announced a change of dates as well as a change of host from Kazan, Russia, to Lima, Peru, due to the 2022 Russian invasion of Ukraine. The same month, FINA announced athletes and officials from Belarus and Russia were banned from the Championships.

== Qualification ==
Various qualification systems were implemented internationally, one of which was used by Swimming New Zealand and Swimming South Africa: the selection of swimmers to compete at the 8th World Junior Swimming Championships from pre-defined national-level competitions based on the swimmers' times and overall national rank of their performances across the defined competitions; only the top two were eligible per individual event. Another selection procedure, put forward by Swim Ireland before the location and dates of the championships were changed and retained after the change, was based on swimmers achieving pre-defined consideration times at a national championship or the 2022 European Junior Championships and overall national rank. Prior to the change of dates and location in 2022, British Swimming also announced a selection procedure, basing selection on swimmer performances at a single selection meet, the 2022 British Swimming Championships.

== Schedule ==
A total of 42 events were competed over six days, starting on 30 August and concluding on 4 September.

H	Heats	SF	Semifinals	(gold)	Finals

M = Morning session (starting at 09:30), E = Evening session (starting at 18:00). Times are Peru time.

Men
Date →	Tue 30		Wed 31		Thu 1		Fri 2		Sat 3		Sun 4	
Event ↓	M	E	M	E	M	E	M	E	M	E	M	E
50 m freestyle					H	SF		1st place, gold medalist(s)				
100 m freestyle									H	SF		1st place, gold medalist(s)
200 m freestyle			H	1st place, gold medalist(s)								
400 m freestyle	H	1st place, gold medalist(s)										
800 m freestyle					H	1st place, gold medalist(s)						
1500 m freestyle											H	1st place, gold medalist(s)
50 m backstroke					H	SF		1st place, gold medalist(s)				
100 m backstroke	H	SF		1st place, gold medalist(s)								
200 m backstroke											H	1st place, gold medalist(s)
50 m breaststroke									H	SF		1st place, gold medalist(s)
100 m breaststroke	H	SF		1st place, gold medalist(s)								
200 m breaststroke							H	1st place, gold medalist(s)				
50 m butterfly							H	SF		1st place, gold medalist(s)		
100 m butterfly			H	SF		1st place, gold medalist(s)						
200 m butterfly											H	1st place, gold medalist(s)
200 m individual medley			H	1st place, gold medalist(s)								
400 m individual medley									H	1st place, gold medalist(s)		
4×100 m freestyle relay	H	1st place, gold medalist(s)										
4×200 m freestyle relay							H	1st place, gold medalist(s)				
4×100 m medley relay											H	1st place, gold medalist(s)

Women
Date →	Tue 30		Wed 31		Thu 1		Fri 2		Sat 3		Sun 4	
Event ↓	M	E	M	E	M	E	M	E	M	E	M	E
50 m freestyle									H	SF		1st place, gold medalist(s)
100 m freestyle			H	SF		1st place, gold medalist(s)						
200 m freestyle											H	1st place, gold medalist(s)
400 m freestyle							H	1st place, gold medalist(s)				
800 m freestyle			H	1st place, gold medalist(s)								
1500 m freestyle									H	1st place, gold medalist(s)		
50 m backstroke							H	SF		1st place, gold medalist(s)		
100 m backstroke	H	SF		1st place, gold medalist(s)								
200 m backstroke					H	1st place, gold medalist(s)						
50 m breaststroke	H	SF		1st place, gold medalist(s)								
100 m breaststroke					H	SF		1st place, gold medalist(s)				
200 m breaststroke											H	1st place, gold medalist(s)
50 m butterfly					H	SF		1st place, gold medalist(s)				
100 m butterfly									H	SF		1st place, gold medalist(s)
200 m butterfly			H	1st place, gold medalist(s)								
200 m individual medley							H	1st place, gold medalist(s)				
400 m individual medley	H	1st place, gold medalist(s)										
4×100 m freestyle relay									H	1st place, gold medalist(s)		
4×200 m freestyle relay	H	1st place, gold medalist(s)										
4×100 m medley relay											H	1st place, gold medalist(s)

Mixed
Date →	Tue 30		Wed 31		Thu 1		Fri 2		Sat 3		Sun 4	
Event ↓	M	E	M	E	M	E	M	E	M	E	M	E
4×100 m freestyle relay					H	1st place, gold medalist(s)						
4×100 m medley relay			H	1st place, gold medalist(s)								

== Medal summary ==
=== Medal table ===
* Host nation (Peru)

Rank	Nation	Gold	Silver	Bronze	Total
1	Japan	7	8	4	19
2	Hungary	7	7	0	14
3	Poland	7	1	6	14
4	Romania	4	2	2	8
4	Turkey	4	2	2	8
6	Spain	3	1	2	6
7	Portugal	3	0	0	3
8	Italy	2	8	10	20
9	Brazil	1	3	1	5
9	South Africa	1	3	1	5
11	Austria	1	1	1	3
11	Croatia	1	1	1	3
11	Serbia	1	1	1	3
14	Czech Republic	0	2	2	4
15	Cyprus	0	1	1	2
15	France	0	1	1	2
17	Denmark	0	0	2	2
18	Greece	0	0	1	1
18	Hong Kong	0	0	1	1
18	Lithuania	0	0	1	1
18	Slovakia	0	0	1	1
18	South Korea	0	0	1	1
Totals (22 entries)		42	42	42	126

== Results ==
=== Men's events ===
Event	Gold		Silver		Bronze	
50 m freestyle	Diogo Ribeiro; Portugal	21.92	Nikolas Antoniou; Cyprus	22.51; NR	Jere Hribar; Croatia	22.55
100 m freestyle	David Popovici; Romania	47.13	Jere Hribar; Croatia	49.37	Nikolas Antoniou; Cyprus	49.91
200 m freestyle	David Popovici; Romania	1:46.18; CR	Dániel Mészáros; Hungary	1:48.98	Filippo Bertoni; Italy	1:49.05
400 m freestyle	Stephan Steverink; Brazil	3:48.27	Vlad Stancu; Romania	3:48.38	Krzysztof Chmielewski; Poland	3:49.34
800 m freestyle	Carlos Garach; Spain	7:52.73	Batuhan Filiz; Turkey	7:55.61	Vlad Stancu; Romania	7:56.14
1500 m freestyle	Carlos Garach; Spain	15:08.14	László Gálicz; Hungary	15:12.71	Vlad Stancu; Romania	15:17.97
50 m backstroke	Ksawery Masiuk; Poland	24.44; CR, NR	Pieter Coetze; South Africa	24.61	Miroslav Knedla; Czech Republic	25.18
100 m backstroke	Ksawery Masiuk; Poland	52.91; CR	Pieter Coetze; South Africa	52.99	Miroslav Knedla; Czech Republic	55.08
200 m backstroke	Pieter Coetze; South Africa	1:56.05; CR	Hidekazu Takehara; Japan	1:58.22	Ksawery Masiuk; Poland	1:58.55
50 m breaststroke	Uroš Živanović; Serbia	27.70	Alex Sabattani; Italy	28.21	Luka Mladenovic; Austria	28.32
100 m breaststroke	Luka Mladenovic; Austria	1:01.30	Uroš Živanović; Serbia	1:01.64	Filip Urbański; Poland	1:02.80
200 m breaststroke	Asahi Kawashima; Japan	2:12.61	Luka Mladenovic; Austria	2:12.94	Adam Mak; Hong Kong	2:13.90
50 m butterfly	Diogo Ribeiro; Portugal	22.96; WJ, NR	Daniel Gracík; Czech Republic	23.46; NR	Casper Puggaard; Denmark	23.96
100 m butterfly	Diogo Ribeiro; Portugal	52.03	Daniel Gracík; Czech Republic	52.51	Casper Puggaard; Denmark	52.94
200 m butterfly	Krzysztof Chmielewski; Poland	1:55.78	Michał Chmielewski; Poland	1:57.69	Ei Kamikawabata; Japan	1:58.37
200 m individual medley	Sanberk Yiğit Oktar; Turkey	1:59.89; NR	Tomoyuki Matsushita; Japan	2:00.89	Yuta Watanabe; Japan	2:01.39
400 m individual medley	Riku Yamaguchi; Japan	4:14.88	Stephan Steverink; Brazil	4:17.68	Vasileios Sofikitis; Greece	4:19.60
4×100 m freestyle relay	Romania; David Popovici (47.07) CR; Alexandru Constantinescu (51.17); Ștefan Cozma (51.10); Patrick Dinu (49.50)	3:18.84	France; Benjamin Chateigner (50.41); Nans Mazellier (49.48); Cédric Gabali (50.26); Mattéo Robba (50.14)	3:20.29	Lithuania; Daniil Pancerevas (49.99); Kiril Stepanov (50.81); Tomas Lukminas (49.96); Rokas Jazdauskas (49.65)	3:20.41
4×200 m freestyle relay	Italy; Alessandro Ragaini (1:49.05); Simone Spediacci (1:49.59); Massimo Chiaroni (1:49.90); Filippo Bertoni (1:48.54); Francesco Lazzari^{[a]}	7:17.08	Hungary; Zsombor Bujdosó (1:51.44); Benedek Bóna (1:48.74); Attila Kovács (1:49.36); Dániel Mészáros (1:48.01)	7:17.55	Poland; Ksawery Masiuk (1:48.93); Krzysztof Matuszewski (1:50.55); Adam Zdybel (1:50.34); Jakub Walter (1:50.11); Michał Pruszyński^{[a]}	7:19.93
4×100 m medley relay	Poland; Ksawery Masiuk (53.46); Filip Urbański (1:02.40); Michał Chmielewski (53.87); Krzysztof Matuszewski (50.44); Filip Kosiński^{[a]} Krzysztof Chmielewski^{[a]} Szymon Misiak^{[a]}	3:40.17	South Africa; Pieter Coetze (53.66); Kian Keylock (1:04.00); Jarden Eaton (54.88); Luca Holtzhausen (50.41)	3:42.95	France; Simon Clusman (55.78); Nans Mazellier (1:04.17); Yohan Airaud (53.31); Mattéo Robba (50.42)	3:43.68

^{a} Swimmers who participated in the heats only and received medals.

=== Women's events ===
Event	Gold		Silver		Bronze	
50 m freestyle	Bianca Costea; Romania	25.35	Sara Curtis; Italy	25.53	Matilde Biagiotti; Italy	25.60
100 m freestyle	Nikolett Pádár; Hungary	55.11	Matilde Biagiotti; Italy	55.56	Marina Cacciapuoti; Italy	55.92
200 m freestyle	Nikolett Pádár; Hungary	1:58.19	Lilla Minna Ábrahám; Hungary	1:58.23	Giulia Vetrano; Italy	1:59.54
400 m freestyle	Merve Tuncel; Turkey	4:10.29	Ruka Takezawa; Japan	4:11.83	Giulia Vetrano; Italy	4:11.86
800 m freestyle	Merve Tuncel; Turkey	8:30.00	Ruka Takezawa; Japan	8:36.80	Carla Carrón; Spain	8:42.88
1500 m freestyle	Merve Tuncel; Turkey	16:15.95	Ruka Takezawa; Japan	16:24.61	Niko Aoki; Japan	16:30.74
50 m backstroke	Lora Komoróczy; Hungary	28.51	Aimi Nagaoka; Japan	28.70	Sara Curtis; Italy	28.93
100 m backstroke	Dóra Molnár; Hungary	1:01.44	Aimi Nagaoka; Japan	1:01.45	Chiaki Yamamoto; Japan	1:02.10
200 m backstroke	Yuzuki Mizuno; Japan	2:09.79	Dóra Molnár; Hungary	2:09.80	Laura Bernat; Poland	2:11.09
50 m breaststroke	Karolina Piechowicz; Poland	31.55	María Ramos; Spain	31.68	Irene Mati; Italy	31.96
100 m breaststroke	Karolina Piechowicz; Poland	1:08.73	Irene Mati; Italy	1:08.94	Martina Bukvić; Serbia	1:09.27
200 m breaststroke	Emma Carrasco; Spain	2:26.93	Yumeno Kusuda; Japan	2:29.62	Defne Coşkun; Turkey	2:29.85
50 m butterfly	Jana Pavalić; Croatia	26.38; NR	Beatriz Bezerra; Brazil	26.67	Lillian Slušná; Slovakia	27.04
100 m butterfly	Mizuki Hirai; Japan	59.53	Beatriz Bezerra; Brazil	59.69	Yang Ha-jung; South Korea	1:00.10
200 m butterfly	Anna Porcari; Italy	2:12.00	Mehlika Kuzeh Yalçın; Turkey	2:13.23	Paola Borrelli; Italy	2:13.36
200 m individual medley	Mio Narita; Japan	2:11.68	Lilla Minna Ábrahám; Hungary	2:13.45	Emma Carrasco; Spain	2:13.74
400 m individual medley	Mio Narita; Japan	4:37.78; CR	Lilla Minna Ábrahám; Hungary	4:44.19	Giulia Vetrano; Italy	4:44.29
4×100 m freestyle relay	Hungary; Lilla Minna Ábrahám (55.59); Nikolett Pádár (54.90); Lili Gyurinovics (56.39); Dóra Molnár (55.06)	3:41.94	Italy; Veronica Quaggio (57.08); Marina Cacciapuoti (55.55); Giulia Vetrano (55.92); Matilde Biagiotti (55.23); Irene Mati^{[b]}	3:43.78	Brazil; Celine Bispo (57.43); Beatriz Bezerra (56.84); Sophia Coleta (58.35); Rafaela Sumida (57.51); Joice Rocha^{[b]}	3:50.13
4×200 m freestyle relay	Hungary; Nikolett Pádár (1:58.37); Dóra Molnár (2:02.40); Lili Gyurinovics (2:01.51); Lilla Minna Ábrahám (2:02.42)	8:04.70	Italy; Matilde Biagiotti (2:00.24); Giulia Vetrano (2:01.59); Veronica Quaggio (2:04.61); Anna Porcari (2:02.15)	8:08.59	Turkey; Merve Tuncel (2:01.98); Mehlika Kuzeh Yalçın (2:05.52); Defne Tanığ (2:07.19); Belis Şakar (2:06.06); Sevim Eylül Süpürgeci^{[b]}	8:20.75
4×100 m medley relay	Japan; Yuzuki Mizuno (1:01.24); Yumeno Kusuda (1:09.88); Mizuki Hirai (59.15); Mio Narita (56.17); Chiaki Yamamoto^{[b]}	4:06.44	Italy; Sara Curtis (1:03.14); Irene Mati (1:08.74); Paola Borrelli (59.78); Matilde Biagiotti (55.25); Anna Porcari^{[b]} Marina Cacciapuoti^{[b]}	4:06.91	Poland; Laura Bernat (1:02.08); Karolina Piechowicz (1:09.19); Paulina Cierpiałowska (1:00.22); Julia Kulik (56.73)	4:08.22

^{b} Swimmers who participated in the heats only and received medals.

=== Mixed events ===
Event	Gold		Silver		Bronze	
4×100 m freestyle relay	Hungary; Dániel Mészáros (50.79); Benedek Bóna (49.46); Nikolett Pádár (54.41); Dóra Molnár (55.37); Boldizsár Magda^{[c]} Lili Gyurinovics^{[c]} Lilla Minna Ábrahám^{[c]}	3:30.03	Romania; David Popovici (47.23); Patrick Dinu (50.17); Bianca Costea (56.87); Rebecca Diaconescu (56.12)	3:30.39	Italy; Francesco Lazzari (50.53); Elia Codardini (50.80); Marina Cacciapuoti (56.21); Matilde Biagiotti (55.00); Massimo Chiarioni^{[c]} Veronica Quaggio^{[c]} Anna Pocari^{[c]}	3:32.54
4×100 m medley relay	Poland; Ksawery Masiuk (53.52); Karolina Piechowicz (1:08.95); Krzysztof Chmielewski (53.31); Paulina Cierpiałowska (56.22); Laura Bernat^{[c]} Filip Urbański^{[c]} Michał Chmielewski^{[c]} Julia Kulik^{[c]}	3:52.00	Italy; Sara Curtis (1:03.19); Irene Mati (1:08.79); Elia Codardini (54.07); Francesco Lazzari (49.53); Alex Sabattani^{[c]} Paolo Borrelli^{[c]} Veronica Quaggio^{[c]}	3:55.58	South Africa; Pieter Coetze (53.31); Kian Keylock (1:04.31); Jessica Thompson (1:02.73); Jessica Carmody (58.23); Hannah Mouton^{[c]}	3:58.58

^{c} Swimmers who participated in the heats only and received medals.

== Championships records set ==
The following Championships records were set during the course of competition.

Day	Date	Event record	Event	Stage	Time	Name	Country	Ref
1	30 August	100 m freestyle (men)	4×100 m freestyle relay (men)	Heats	47.37	David Popovici	Romania	
1	30 August	100 m backstroke (men)	Same	Semifinals	52.95 (AF)	Pieter Coetze	South Africa	
1	30 August	400 m individual medley (women)	Same	Final	4:37.78	Mio Narita	Japan	
1	30 August	100 m freestyle (men)	4×100 m freestyle relay (men)	Final	47.07	David Popovici	Romania	
2	31 August	100 m backstroke (men)	Same	Final	52.91	Ksawery Masiuk	Poland	
2	31 August	200 m freestyle (men)	Same	Final	1:46.18	David Popovici	Romania	
3	1 September	50 m backstroke (men)	Same	Semifinals	24.58	Pieter Coetze	South Africa	
4	2 September	50 m butterfly (men)	Same	Heats	23.12	Diogo Ribeiro	Portugal	
4	2 September	50 m backstroke (men)	Same	Final	24.44 (NR)	Ksawery Masiuk	Poland	
5	3 September	50 m butterfly (men)	Same	Final	22.96 (WJ, NR)	Diogo Ribeiro	Portugal	
6	4 September	200 m backstroke (men)	Same	Final	1:56.05	Pieter Coetze	South Africa	

== Participating countries ==
Swimmers from the following countries participated at the Championships.

Australia, Canada, the United States, Germany, and Great Britain chose not to attend.

1. Angola (5)
2. Antigua and Barbuda (5)
3. Argentina (8)
4. Aruba (5)
5. Austria (2)
6. Bahamas (6)
7. Barbados (3)
8. Bolivia (11)
9. Brazil (20)
10. Chile (5)
11. Chinese Taipei (8)
12. Colombia (6)
13. Costa Rica (6)
14. Croatia (2)
15. Curaçao (3)
16. Cyprus (1)
17. Czech Republic (6)
18. Denmark (1)
19. Dominican Republic (12)
20. Ecuador (7)
21. El Salvador (11)
22. Federated States of Micronesia (1)
23. France (7)
24. Ghana (7)
25. Greece (2)
26. Grenada (3)
27. Guatemala (4)
28. Guyana (3)
29. Haiti (1)
30. Hong Kong (7)
31. Honduras (13)
32. Hungary (15)
33. India (6)
34. Italy (16)
35. Jamaica (7)
36. Japan (17)
37. Jordan (3)
38. Kenya (2)
39. Latvia (2)
40. Lebanon (1)
41. Lithuania (6)
42. Madagascar (1)
43. Malawi (1)
44. Malaysia (2)
45. Maldives (3)
46. Mexico (8)
47. Mongolia (4)
48. Morocco (4)
49. Mozambique (2)
50. Namibia (3)
51. Nepal (3)
52. Nigeria (5)
53. Northern Mariana Islands (2)
54. Pakistan (8)
55. Palau (4)
56. Paraguay (12)
57. Peru (20)
58. Philippines (8)
59. Poland (15)
60. Portugal (1)
61. Puerto Rico (4)
62. Romania (9)
63. Saint Lucia (4)
64. Saint Vincent and the Grenadines (1)
65. Serbia (5)
66. Seychelles (4)
67. Sierra Leone (1)
68. Slovakia (8)
69. South Africa (26)
70. South Korea (12)
71. Spain (9)
72. Sri Lanka (1)
73. Sudan (3)
74. Suriname (4)
75. Suspended Member Federation (2)
76. Tanzania (7)
77. Togo (3)
78. Trinidad and Tobago (1)
79. Tunisia (1)
80. Turkey (15)
81. Turks and Caicos Islands (3)
82. Uganda (4)
83. United States Virgin Islands (5)
84. Uruguay (10)
85. Venezuela (2)
86. Zambia (2)
87. Zimbabwe (1)

== Change of dates and location ==
=== Postponement due to the COVID-19 pandemic ===
In March 2021, British Swimming announced that the impacts of the COVID-19 pandemic combined with other factors, including no publicly revealed dates or venue for the 8th World Junior Swimming Championships, had changed how they were conducting their selection trials for the 2020 Summer Olympics. By the end of the month, Swimming Australia had withdrawn its swimmers for the championships due to concerns about transmission of COVID-19 to its athletes. The following month Swimming Canada pulled out of the competition as well, in part due to concerns about the health and safety of its swimmers and in part due to difficulties fairly running qualification events. Two months later, in June, FINA postponed the championships to August 2022 in the pursuit of safer travel conditions and fewer COVID-19-related risks for participating athletes. Frustration was vocalized by USA Swimming following the postponement of the championships, and youth who would have competed at the championships had they been held in 2021 instead competed at the 2021 FINA Swimming World Cup.

=== Path to cancelation ===
The 8th World Junior Swimming Championships was originally scheduled to take place at the Palace of Water Sports in Kazan, Russia in 2021, and in June 2021 it was postponed to 24–29 August 2022 due to the COVID-19 pandemic. This followed the implementation of a ban by the Court of Arbitration for Sport spanning 17 December 2020 to 16 December 2022 not allowing Russians to compete at World Championships with their country name, flag, or anthem, meaning Russian youth competing at these Championships would be required to compete without their country name, flag, and anthem in their own country.

On 25 February 2022, elevated political tensions between Russia and Ukraine resulted in FINA cancelling water polo, artistic swimming, and diving events that had been scheduled to take place in Russia for March and April 2022, in regards to other competitions scheduled to take place in Russia for the 2022 year, FINA stated, "Other FINA events that are scheduled in Russia for later in the year are under close review, with FINA monitoring events in Ukraine very carefully."

On 26 February 2022, nine members of various Nordic Swimming Federations published a joint statement announcing their withdrawal from the Championships if they are hosted in Russia as a form of protest in opposition to the 2022 Russian invasion of Ukraine. The following national swimming federation presidents signed the statement: Danish Swimming Union (Denmark), Estonian Swimming Federation (Estonia), Faroe Islands Swimming Association (Faroe Islands), Finnish Swimming Federation (Finland), Icelandic Swimming Association (Iceland), Latvian Swimming Federation (Latvia), Lithuanian Swimming Federation (Lithuania), Norwegian Swimming Federation (Norway), and Swedish Swimming Federation (Sweden).

On 27 February 2022, FINA published an official statement canceling the 8th FINA World Junior Swimming Championships. FINA was one of a number of sporting organizations, which also included Formula One and the International Ski Federation, to boycott holding competitions in Russia by canceling an event originally scheduled to be held in the county.

=== Path to reinstatement ===
On 23 March 2022, FINA announced its intent to reinstate the 8th World Junior Swimming Championships with a change of host venue and possibly dates. The same day, FINA announced the Russian Swimming Federation had earlier withdrawn its athletes from FINA events for the remainder of the 2022 calendar year, meaning they would not send athletes to the Championships.

On 14 April 2022, FINA announced the reinstatement of the Championships with Lima, Peru, serving as the new host of the event, Videna Aquatic Center serving as the new venue; and a change of dates to 30 August through 4 September 2022.

On 21 April 2022, FINA published a statement instituting a ban on all athletes and officials from Russia and Belarus for the Championships and all remaining FINA events in 2022.

== See also ==
- List of swimming competitions
- FINA World Junior Swimming Championships
- 2022 in sports
