= Diving at the 2026 European Aquatics Championships – Women's 10 m platform =

Women's 10 m platform at the 2026 European Aquatics Championships
- Venue: Paris Aquatic Centre
- Dates: 3 August
- Competitors: 19 from 13 nations
- Winning points: 327.05

Medalists
gold medal	Maisie Bond	Great Britain
silver medal	Pauline Pfeif	Germany
bronze medal	Else Praasterink	Netherlands

The Women's 10 m platform competition at the 2026 European Aquatics Championships was held on 3 August 2026.

== Results ==
The preliminary round was started at 13:00. The final was started at 21:00.

Green denotes finalists

Rank	Diver	Nationality	Preliminary		Final	
Rank	Diver	Nationality	Points	Rank	Points	Rank
1st place, gold medalist(s)	Maisie Bond	Great Britain	287.70	5	327.05	1
2nd place, silver medalist(s)	Pauline Pfeif	Germany	307.55	2	305.30	2
3rd place, bronze medalist(s)	Else Praasterink	Netherlands	289.40	4	305.15	3
4	Eden Cheng	Great Britain	246.25	12	297.60	4
5	Cloe Grávalos Simón	Switzerland	281.25	6	288.10	5
6	Sarah Jodoin Di Maria	Italy	296.30	3	284.25	6
7	Valeria Antolino	Spain	268.15	10	282.55	7
8	Aleksandra Kedrina	Neutral Athletes B	269.25	8	280.00	8
9	Sofiia Vystavkina	Ukraine	268.70	9	277.50	9
10	Elena Wassen	Germany	275.55	7	275.85	10
11	Ana Carvajal	Spain	308.70	1	270.60	11
12	Emily Hallifax	France	266.25	11	248.35	12
13	Ekaterina Beliaeva	Neutral Athletes B	241.20	13	Did not advance	
14	Matilde Marzetti	Italy	228.40	14	Did not advance	
15	Iva Ereminova	Bulgaria	226.95	15	Did not advance	
16	Maria Łukaszewicz	Poland	223.75	16	Did not advance	
17	Ioana Cârcu	Romania	199.60	17	Did not advance	
18	Luisa Arco	Portugal	184.85	18	Did not advance	
19	Nazanin Ellahi	Romania	182.95	19	Did not advance	
	Alisa Zakaryan	Armenia	Did not start			
