= Swimming at the 2022 European Aquatics Championships – Men's 100 metre freestyle =

Men's 100 metre freestyle at the 2022 European Aquatics Championships
- Venue: Foro Italico
- Dates: 12 August (heats and semifinals); 13 August (final)
- Competitors: 77 from 34 nations
- Winning time: 46.86 WR

Medalists
gold medal	David Popovici	Romania
silver medal	Kristóf Milák	Hungary
bronze medal	Alessandro Miressi	Italy

The Men's 100 metre freestyle competition of the 2022 European Aquatics Championships was held on 12 and 13 August 2022.

== Records ==
Prior to the competition, the existing world, European and championship records were as follows.

	Name	Nationality	Time	Location	Date
World record	César Cielo	Brazil	46.91	Rome	30 July 2009
European record	Kliment Kolesnikov	Russia	47.11	Tokyo	28 July 2021
Championship record	Kliment Kolesnikov	Russia	47.37	Budapest	19 May 2021

The following records were set during this competition.

Date	Event	Name	Nationality	Time	Record
12 August	Heat 8	David Popovici	Romania	47.20	CR
12 August	Semifinal 2	David Popovici	Romania	46.98	ER
13 August	Final	David Popovici	Romania	46.86	WR

== Results ==
=== Heats ===
The heats were started on 12 August at 09:10.

Rank	Heat	Lane	Name	Nationality	Time	Notes
1	8	4	David Popovici	Romania	47.20	Q, CR
2	7	4	Alessandro Miressi	Italy	47.60	Q
3	8	3	Lorenzo Zazzeri	Italy	48.27	Q
4	6	4	Maxime Grousset	France	48.31	Q
5	8	5	Nándor Németh	Hungary	48.32	Q
6	8	1	Heiko Gigler	Austria	48.43	Q, NR
7	7	2	Stan Pijnenburg	Netherlands	48.57	Q
8	6	5	Andrej Barna	Serbia	48.59	Q
9	8	2	Hadrien Salvan	France	48.60	Q
10	6	6	Manuel Frigo	Italy	48.76	
11	7	3	Thomas Dean	Great Britain	48.79	Q
12	7	6	Kristóf Milák	Hungary	48.88	Q
12	7	7	Diogo Ribeiro	Portugal	48.88	Q
14	7	5	Thomas Ceccon	Italy	48.92	
15	5	3	Luis Domínguez	Spain	48.98	Q, NR
16	7	1	Björn Seeliger	Sweden	49.01	Q
17	8	6	Matthew Richards	Great Britain	49.02	Q
18	6	2	Charles Rihoux	France	49.15	
19	8	7	Karol Ostrowski	Poland	49.22	Q
20	7	8	Kamil Sieradzki	Poland	49.24	
21	4	4	Carles Coll	Spain	49.29	
22	6	8	Sergio de Celis	Spain	49.34	
23	6	3	Jacob Whittle	Great Britain	49.35	
24	6	7	Edward Mildred	Great Britain	49.45	
24	7	9	Deniel Nankov	Bulgaria	49.45	
26	6	1	Robin Hanson	Sweden	49.52	
27	8	0	Guillaume Guth	France	49.59	
28	8	8	Sergii Shevtsov	Ukraine	49.60	
29	5	0	Illya Linnyk	Ukraine	49.69	
30	4	5	Uroš Nikolić	Serbia	49.73	
30	5	2	Daniel Zaitsev	Estonia	49.73	
32	4	8	Frederik Lentz	Denmark	49.76	
33	4	1	Mario Mollà	Spain	49.90	
34	5	7	Valentyn Nesterkin	Ukraine	49.95	
35	6	9	Denis Loktev	Israel	49.98	
35	5	6	Dániel Mészáros	Hungary	49.98	
37	3	2	George Stoica-Constantin	Romania	50.01	
38	5	4	Nikola Aćin	Serbia	50.06	
39	4	6	Stergios Bilas	Greece	50.11	
40	3	0	Rémi Fabiani	Luxembourg	50.12	
40	5	5	Max McCusker	Ireland	50.12	
42	5	8	Markus Lie	Norway	50.15	
42	8	9	Odysseus Meladinis	Greece	50.15	
44	5	9	Matej Duša	Slovakia	50.29	
45	3	5	Oleksii Khnykin	Ukraine	50.32	
46	2	5	Martin Kartavi	Israel	50.35	
47	3	6	Daniel Namir	Israel	50.36	
48	4	0	Tomas Navikonis	Lithuania	50.42	
49	4	2	Tomas Sungaila	Lithuania	50.44	
50	2	1	Adi Mešetović	Bosnia and Herzegovina	50.46	
51	3	3	Christos Papadopoulos	Greece	50.55	
52	3	9	Elias Persson	Sweden	50.56	
53	3	8	Patrick Dinu	Romania	50.59	
54	3	4	Alex Ahtiainen	Estonia	50.62	
55	4	7	Nicholas Lia	Norway	50.71	
56	3	1	Pit Brandenburger	Luxembourg	50.81	
57	2	4	Elias Meeus	Belgium	50.89	
58	2	7	Mihai Gergely	Romania	50.90	
58	2	8	Luka Kukhalashvili	Georgia	50.90	NR
60	2	3	Marcus Holmquist	Sweden	50.91	
61	4	3	Artur Barseghyan	Armenia	50.93	
62	2	6	Robert Powell	Ireland	50.99	
63	7	0	Mateusz Chowaniec	Poland	51.14	
64	3	7	Malthe Lindeblad	Denmark	51.31	
65	2	2	Nikola Bjelajac	Bosnia and Herzegovina	51.54	
66	2	9	Símon Elías Statkevicius	Iceland	51.94	
67	2	0	Uroš Živanović	Serbia	52.10	
68	1	4	Tomàs Lomero	Andorra	52.25	
69	4	9	Ari-Pekka Liukkonen	Finland	52.62	
70	1	6	Rudi Spiteri	Malta	52.90	
71	1	3	Ronens Kermans	Latvia	52.92	
72	1	5	Bernat Lomero	Andorra	53.04	
73	1	1	Raoul Stafrace	Malta	53.70	
74	1	2	Matthew Galea	Malta	53.73	
75	1	7	Ado Gargović	Montenegro	54.45	
76	1	8	Vladimir Mamikonyan	Armenia	54.92	
77	1	0	Martin Muja	Kosovo	55.76	
	6	0	Meiron Cheruti	Israel	Did not start	
	5	1	Nils Liess	Switzerland	Did not start	

=== Semifinals ===
The semifinal were started on 12 August at 18:33.

Rank	Heat	Lane	Name	Nationality	Time	Notes
1	2	4	David Popovici	Romania	46.98	Q, WJ, ER
2	1	7	Kristóf Milák	Hungary	47.76	Q, NR
3	1	4	Alessandro Miressi	Italy	47.96	Q
4	2	5	Lorenzo Zazzeri	Italy	48.05	Q
5	1	5	Maxime Grousset	France	48.15	q
6	1	6	Andrej Barna	Serbia	48.21	q
7	2	3	Nándor Németh	Hungary	48.22	q
8	1	2	Thomas Dean	Great Britain	48.44	q
9	2	7	Diogo Ribeiro	Portugal	48.52	NR
10	2	2	Hadrien Salvan	France	48.58	
11	1	8	Karol Ostrowski	Poland	48.69	
12	1	3	Heiko Gigler	Austria	48.85	
13	2	6	Stan Pijnenburg	Netherlands	48.94	
14	1	1	Björn Seeliger	Sweden	48.96	
15	2	8	Matthew Richards	Great Britain	49.01	
16	2	1	Luis Domínguez	Spain	49.04	

=== Final ===
The final was held on 13 August at 18:22.

Rank	Lane	Name	Nationality	Time	Notes
1st place, gold medalist(s)	4	David Popovici	Romania	46.86	WR
2nd place, silver medalist(s)	5	Kristóf Milák	Hungary	47.47	NR
3rd place, bronze medalist(s)	3	Alessandro Miressi	Italy	47.63	
4	2	Maxime Grousset	France	47.78	
5	1	Nándor Németh	Hungary	48.01	
6	6	Lorenzo Zazzeri	Italy	48.10	
7	8	Thomas Dean	Great Britain	48.23	
8	7	Andrej Barna	Serbia	48.38	
