= Vlad Stancu =

Romanian swimmer

Personal information
- Full name: Vlad-Ștefan Stancu
- National team: Romania
- Born: 13 August 2005 (age 20) Romania

Sport
- Sport: Swimming
- Strokes: Freestyle
- Club: CSA Steaua
- Coach: Iulia Becheru
Medal record
Men's swimming
Representing Romania
Event	1st	2nd	3rd
World Junior Championships	0	1	2
European Junior Championships	2	2	0
Total	2	3	2
World Junior Championships
Silver medal – second place	2022 Lima	400 m freestyle
Bronze medal – third place	2022 Lima	800 m freestyle
Bronze medal – third place	2022 Lima	1500 m freestyle
European Junior Championships
Gold medal – first place	2022 Otopeni	1500 m freestyle
Gold medal – first place	2022 Otopeni	4×100 m freestyle
Silver medal – second place	2022 Otopeni	400 m freestyle
Silver medal – second place	2022 Otopeni	800 m freestyle

Vlad-Ștefan Stancu (Romanian pronunciation: [ˈvlad ʃteˈfan ˈstaŋku]; born 13 August 2005) is a Romanian competitive swimmer. He is the Romanian record holder in the long course 1500-metre freestyle and long course and short course 800-metre freestyle. At the 2022 World Junior Championships, he won the silver medal in the 400-metre freestyle and bronze medals in the 800-metre freestyle and the 1500-metre freestyle. At the 2022 European Junior Swimming Championships, he won gold medals in the 1500-metre freestyle and 4×100-metre freestyle relay and silver medals in the 400-metre freestyle and 800-metre freestyle.

== Background ==
Stancu attended Emil Racoviță National College in Bucharest for high school. He trains with and competes for the swim club with CSA Steaua București (CSA Steaua).

== Career ==
=== 2021 ===
For the 2021 European Junior Swimming Championships, in July at Stadio Olimpico del Nuoto in Rome, Italy, 15-year-old Stancu placed fifth in the 400-metre freestyle, sixth in the 800-metre freestyle, and ninth in the 1500-metre freestyle. At the 2021 European Short Course Swimming Championships, held in November at the Palace of Water Sports in Kazan, Russia, the 800-metre freestyle was contested for men for the first time, and winning the first heat of the event in 7:48.10, at 16 years, 85 days of age, he briefly held the Championships record before it was broken in a later heat by Florian Wellbrock of Germany, he also set a new Romanian record and placed 12th in the event overall, placed 12th in the 1500-metre freestyle with a 14:55.74, 14th in the 400-metre freestyle with a 3:43.99, and 22nd in the 200-metre freestyle with a personal best time of 1:46.59.

=== 2022 ===
In April 2022, at the Multinations Junior Swimming Meet held in Kranj, Slovenia, Stancu helped set a new Romanian record in the 4×200-metre freestyle relay at 16 years of age with a final time of 7:28.43, splitting a 1:53.23 for the second leg of the relay.

==== 2022 European Junior Championships ====
2022 European Junior Championships
Gold medal – first place	4×100 m freestyle	3:18.93
Gold medal – first place	1500 m freestyle	15:05.47 (NR)
Silver medal – second place	800 m freestyle	7:54.02 (NR)
Silver medal – second place	400 m freestyle	3:50.61

At the 2022 European Junior Swimming Championships, held in Otopeni in early July, Stancu won his first medal on day one as part of the 4×100-metre freestyle relay, swimming the second leg of the relay in a time of 51.11 seconds in the final to contribute to the gold medal-winning time of 3:18.93. Two days later, he won the gold medal in the 1500-metre freestyle with a Romanian record time of 15:05.47, breaking the former record established at the 2004 Summer Olympics by Dragoș Coman with a time of 15:06.33. Another two days after that, he set a new Romanian record in the 800-metre freestyle and won the silver medal with a time of 7:54.02. The morning of the sixth and final day, he ranked fourth in the preliminaries of the 400-metre freestyle, qualifying for the evening final with a time of 3:54.96. In the final, he tied Krzysztof Chmielewski of Poland for the silver medal with a time of 3:50.61, finishing 2.47 seconds behind gold medalist in the event Lorenzo Galossi of Italy. Following his performances, Stancu announced his intent to compete at the 2022 World Junior Swimming Championships.

==== 2022 World Junior Championships ====
2022 World Junior Championships
Silver medal – second place	400 m freestyle	3:48.38
Bronze medal – third place	800 m freestyle	7:56.14
Bronze medal – third place	1500 m freestyle	15:17.97

Day one of the 2022 FINA World Junior Swimming Championships, held starting 30 August in Lima, Peru, Stancu ranked third in the preliminary heats of the 400-metre freestyle with a time of 3:51.43 and qualified for the final. In the final later the same day, he won the first medal for Romania at the Championships, a silver medal with a personal best time of 3:48.38, which was just 0.11 seconds behind gold medalist Stephan Steverink of Brazil. Two days later, he won his second medal of the Championships, a bronze medal in the 800-metre freestyle, finishing in a time of 7:56.14. The sixth and final day, he won the bronze medal in the 1500-metre freestyle with a time of 15:17.97.

==== 2022 Romanian Short Course Championships ====
In November, at the 2022 Romanian Short Course Championships held in Otopeni, Stancu set a new Romanian record of 4:12.77 in the final of the 400-metre individual medley to win the gold medal. The following day, he lowered his Romanian record in the 800-metre freestyle to a 7:44.97, achieving the time en route to a gold medal-win in the 1500-metre freestyle with a personal best time of 14:41.14 that was over 51 seconds faster than the second-place finisher. On the third day, he finished 0.76 seconds behind the first-place finisher in the 400-metre freestyle to win a silver medal with a personal best time of 3:43.76.

=== 2023 ===
At 17 years of age at the 2023 Romanian Championships in April in Otopeni, Stancu won the senior and youth national titles in the 800-metre freestyle with a time of 7:58.38 on day one. The third day, 6 April, he won the senior and youth national titles in the 200-metre butterfly with a 2:01.03 before winning the youth national title and senior silver medal in the 400-metre freestyle with a time of 3:52.45. Day five of five, he won the senior and youth national titles in the 1500-metre freestyle in a time of 15:22.45 and won a youth national title in the 4×100-metre medley relay, helping achieve a time of 3:54.35 by swimming the butterfly leg of the relay. In June, he won five gold medals in individual events at the 2023 Romanian Cup, one each in the 400-metre freestyle, 800-metre freestyle, 1500-metre freestyle, 200-metre butterfly, and the 400-metre individual medley, where he set a new Romanian record with his time of 4:18.70 that broke the former mark of 4:19.72 by Cezar Bădiță from 2003.

== International championships (50 m) ==
Meet	400 freestyle	800 freestyle	1500 freestyle	4×100 freestyle relay
EJC 2021 (age: 15)	5th (3:53.09)	6th (8:05.46)	7th (15:29.00)	
EJC 2022 (age: 16)	(silver) (3:50.61)	(silver) (7:54.02 NR)	(gold) (15:05.47 NR)	(gold) (split 51.11, 2nd leg)
WJC 2022 (age: 17)	(silver) (3:48.38)	(bronze) (7:56.14)	(bronze) (15:17.97)	

== International championships (25 m) ==
Meet	200 freestyle	400 freestyle	800 freestyle	1500 freestyle
EC 2021 (age: 16)	22nd (1:46.59)	14th (3:43.99)	12th (7:48.10 CR, NR)	12th (14:55.74)

== Personal best times ==
=== Long course metres (50 m pool) ===
Event	Time	Meet	Location	Date	Notes	Ref
400 m freestyle	3:48.38	2022 World Junior Championships	Lima, Peru	30 August 2022		
800 m freestyle	7:54.02	2022 European Junior Championships	Otopeni	9 July 2022	NR	
1500 m freestyle	15:05.47	2022 European Junior Championships	Otopeni	7 July 2022	NR	
400 m individual medley	4:18.70	2023 Romanian Cup	Otopeni	4 June 2023	NR	

Legend: NR – Romanian record;
Records not set in finals: h – heat; sf – semifinal; r – relay 1st leg; rh – relay heat 1st leg; b – B final; † – en route to final mark; so – swim-off; tt – time trial

=== Short course metres (25 m pool) ===
Event	Time		Meet	Location	Date	Notes	Ref
200 m freestyle	1:46.59	h	2021 European Short Course Championships	Kazan, Russia	5 November 2021		
400 m freestyle	3:43.76		2022 Romanian Short Course Championships	Otopeni	13 November 2022		
800 m freestyle	7:44.97	†	2022 Romanian Short Course Championships	Otopeni	12 November 2022	NR	
1500 m freestyle	14:41.14		2022 Romanian Short Course Championships	Otopeni	12 November 2022		
400 m individual medley	4:12.77		2022 Romanian Short Course Championships	Otopeni	11 November 2022	NR	

Legend: NR – Romanian record;
Records not set in finals: h – heat; sf – semifinal; r – relay 1st leg; rh – relay heat 1st leg; b – B final; † – en route to final mark; so – swim-off; tt – time trial

== National records ==
=== Long course metres (50 m pool) ===
No.	Event	Time	Meet	Location	Date	Age	Status	Ref
1	4×200 m freestyle	7:28.43	2022 Multinations Junior Swimming Meet	Kranj, Slovenia	9 April 2022	16 years, 239 days	Current	
2	1500 m freestyle	15:05.47	2022 European Junior Swimming Championships	Otopeni	7 July 2022	16 years, 328 days	Current	
3	800 m freestyle	7:54.02	2022 European Junior Swimming Championships	Otopeni	9 July 2022	16 years, 330 days	Current	
4	400 m individual medley	4:18.70	2023 Romanian Cup	Otopeni	4 June 2023	17 years, 295 days	Current	

=== Short course metres (25 m pool) ===
No.	Event	Time		Meet	Location	Date	Age	Status	Ref
1	800 m freestyle	7:48.10	h	2021 European Short Course Swimming Championships	Kazan, Russia	6 November 2021	16 years, 85 days	Former	
2	400 m individual medley	4:12.77		2022 Romanian Short Course Championships	Otopeni	11 November 2022	17 years, 90 days	Current	
3	800 m freestyle (2)	7:44.97	†	2022 Romanian Short Course Championships	Otopeni	12 November 2022	17 years, 91 days	Current	

Legend: h – prelims heat; † – en route to final mark
