= Giulia Vetrano =

Italian swimmer (born 2005)

Personal information
- Nationality: Italian
- Born: 5 December 2005 (age 20) Turin, Italy

Sport
- Sport: Swimming
Medal record
Representing Italy
World Junior Championships
Silver medal – second place	2022 Lima	4×100 m freestyle
Silver medal – second place	2022 Lima	4×200 m freestyle
Bronze medal – third place	2022 Lima	200 m freestyle
Bronze medal – third place	2022 Lima	400 m freestyle
Bronze medal – third place	2022 Lima	400 m medley
European Junior Championships
Silver medal – second place	2022 Otopeni	200 m freestyle
Silver medal – second place	2022 Otopeni	400 m freestyle
Silver medal – second place	2022 Otopeni	4×200 m freestyle
Bronze medal – third place	2021 Rome	400 m freestyle
Bronze medal – third place	2021 Rome	800 m freestyle
Bronze medal – third place	2022 Otopeni	800 m freestyle

Giulia Vetrano (born 5 December 2005) is an Italian swimmer. She competed in the women's 4 × 200 metre freestyle relay at the 2020 Summer Olympics.
