= Diving at the 2026 European Aquatics Championships – Women's 10 m synchro platform =

Women's 10 m synchro platform at the 2026 European Aquatics Championships
- Venue: Paris Aquatic Centre
- Dates: 1 August
- Competitors: 14 from 7 nations
- Teams: 7
- Winning points: 300.06

Medalists
gold medal	Maisie Bond; Lois Toulson	Great Britain
silver medal	Pauline Pfeif; Elena Wassen	Germany
bronze medal	Kseniya Baylo; Sofiia Vystavkina	Ukraine

The Women's 10 m synchro platform competition at the 2026 European Aquatics Championships was held on 1 August 2026.

== Results ==
The final was started at 20:00.

Rank	Nation	Points					
Rank	Nation	D1	D2	D3	D4	D5	Total
1st place, gold medalist(s)	Great Britain; Maisie Bond; Lois Toulson	49.20	46.80	63.90	70.08	70.08	300.06
2nd place, silver medalist(s)	Germany; Pauline Pfeif; Elena Wassen	48.60	45.60	67.20	64.80	72.00	298.20
3rd place, bronze medalist(s)	Ukraine; Kseniya Baylo; Sofiia Vystavkina	46.20	45.00	55.80	75.84	63.30	286.14
4	Spain; Valeria Antolino; Ana Carvajal	44.40	41.40	63.00	64.32	69.12	282.24
5	Neutral Athletes B Aleksandra Kedrina; Anna Konanykhina	49.80	45.00	60.30	47.04	60.48	262.62
6	Italy; Matilde Marzetti; Irene Pesce	43.80	42.60	52.08	54.90	49.92	243.30
7	Romania; Ioana Cârcu; Nazanin Ellahi	39.60	38.40	50.40	43.50	53.10	225.00
