= Sofiia Vystavkina =

Ukrainian diver (born 2009)

Personal information
- Born: 20 January 2009 (age 17)

Sport
- Country: Ukraine
- Sport: Diving
Medal record
Women's diving
Representing Ukraine
European Championships
Bronze medal – third place	2026 Paris	10 m synchro

Sofiia Vystavkina (Ukrainian: Софія Виставкіна; born 20 January 2009) is a Ukrainian diver.

== Career ==
At the 2026 European Championships, she won the bronze medal in the women's 10 m synchro event, pairing with Kseniia Baylo.
