= Maisie Bond =

British diver (born 2007)

Personal information
- Nationality: British
- Born: 8 May 2007 (age 19)

Sport
- Country: Great Britain
- Sport: Diving
- Events: 10 m, 10 m synchro
Medal record
Women's diving
Representing Great Britain
European Championships
Gold medal – first place	2026 Paris	10 m synchro
Gold medal – first place	2026 Paris	10 m platform

Maisie Bond (born 8 May 2007) is a British diver. She is a two-time European Championships gold medalist.

== Career ==
Bond began diving at five years old. She began partnering with Olympian Lois Toulson in synchronized diving in 2022.

She made her World Junior Diving Championships debut in 2022 and won a silver medal in the 10 metre platform event. She again competed at the World Junior Championships in 2024 and won a silver medal in the 10 metre platform and a bronze medal in the 10 metre synchro event. She was named Diving Emerging Athlete of the Year at the 2024 Aquatics GB Awards.

In June 2025, she competed at the 2025 British Diving Championships and won gold medals in the 10 metre platform and 10 metre synchronized platform, along with Toulson. The next month she made her World Aquatics Championships debut at the 2025 World Aquatics Championships and finished in fifth place in the 10 metre synchronized platform event, along with Toulson.

In June 2026, Bond was selected to represent Great Britain at the 2026 European Aquatics Championships. She won a gold medal in the 10 metre synchro event, along with Toulson. She then won a gold medal in the 10 metre platform with a score of 327.05.
