= Emma Carrasco =

Spanish swimmer (born 2005)

Personal information
- Full name: Emma Carrasco Cadens
- Born: 31 December 2005 (age 20) Lleida, Spain

Sport
- Sport: Swimming

Emma Carrasco Cadens (Note: In this Spanish name, the first or paternal surname is Carrasco and the second or maternal family name is Cadens.) (born 31 December 2005) is a Spanish competitive swimmer. She represented Spain at the 2024 Summer Olympics.
