= Nikolas Antoniou =

Cypriot swimmer (born 2004)

Personal information
- Nationality: Cypriot
- Born: 20 January 2004 (age 22) Limassol, Cyprus

Sport
- Sport: Swimming
Medal record
Men's swimming
Representing Cyprus
World Junior Championships
Silver medal – second place	2022 Lima	50 m freestyle
Bronze medal – third place	2022 Lima	100 m freestyle

Nikolas Antoniou (born 20 January 2004) is a Cypriot swimmer. He competed in the men's 100 metre freestyle at the 2020 Summer Olympics.

He represented Cyprus at the 2024 Summer Olympics in Paris, competing in freestyle events.

As of 2024, Antoniou is pursuing a dual degree in Computer Science and Electrical Engineering at the University of California, Berkeley.

Nikolas Antoniou began competing in swimming seriously at the age of 15, which he attributes to preserving his long-term passion for the sport.
