= Bianca Costea =

Romanian swimmer (born 2005)

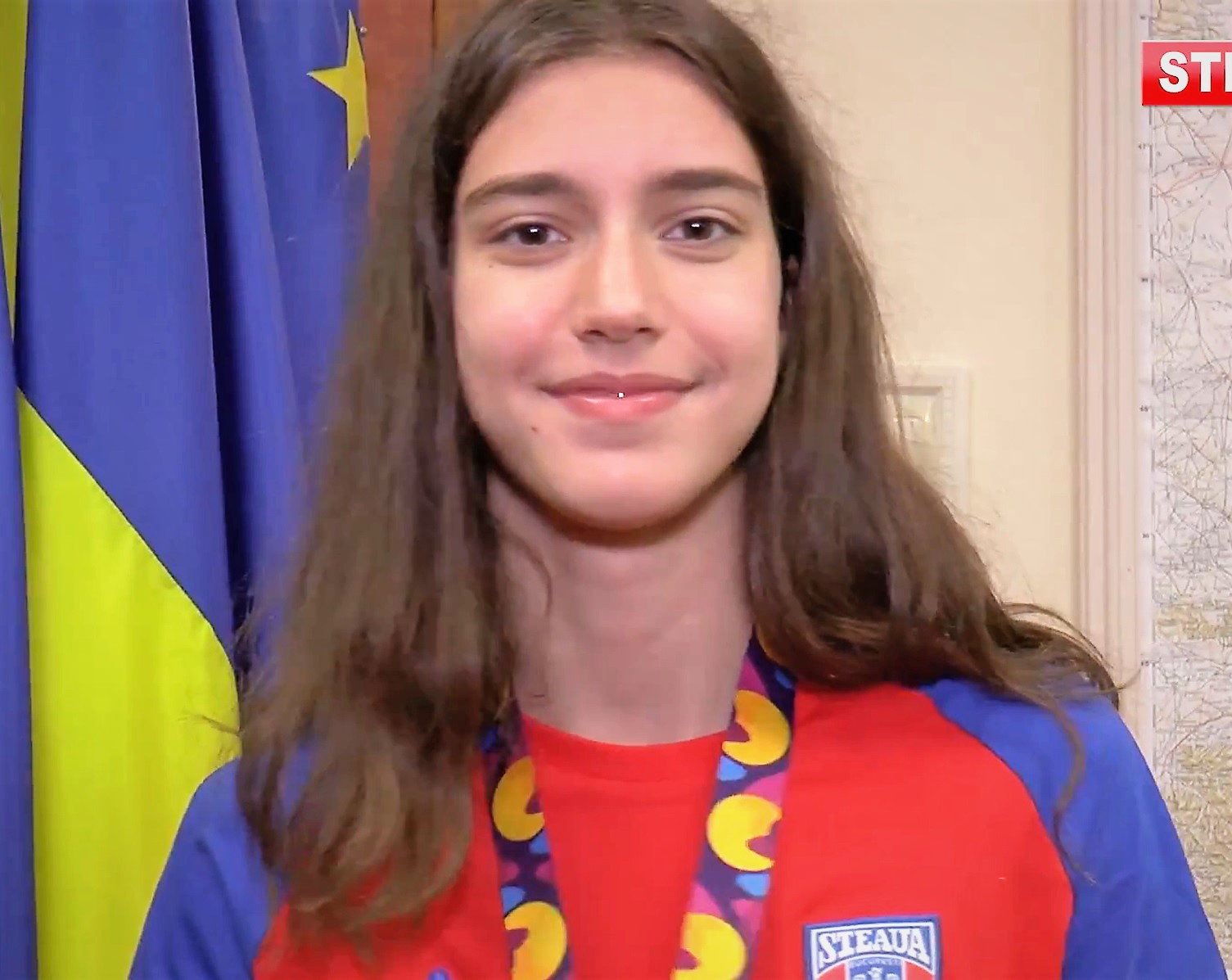
- Costea in 2019

Personal information
- National team: Romania
- Born: 26 January 2005 (age 21) Galați, Romania

Sport
- Sport: Swimming
- Strokes: Freestyle
Medal record
Women's swimming
Representing Romania
Youth level
World Junior Championships
| Gold medal – first place | 2022 Lima | 50 m freestyle |
| Silver medal – second place | 2022 Lima | 4×100 m mixed freestyle relay |
European Junior Championships
| Silver medal – second place | 2022 Otopeni | 50 m freestyle |
| Silver medal – second place | 2022 Otopeni | 4×100 m mixed freestyle relay |
European Youth Olympic Festival
| Gold medal – first place | 2019 Baku | 50 m freestyle |

Bianca-Andreea Costea (Romanian pronunciation: [biˈaŋka anˈdree̯a ˈkoste̯a]; born January 26, 2005) is a Romanian swimmer who is competing in the 50 meter and 100 meter freestyle events at the 2020 Summer Olympics. She won a gold medal in the 50 meter freestyle at the 2019 European Youth Summer Olympic Festival.
