= Otopeni =

- Town
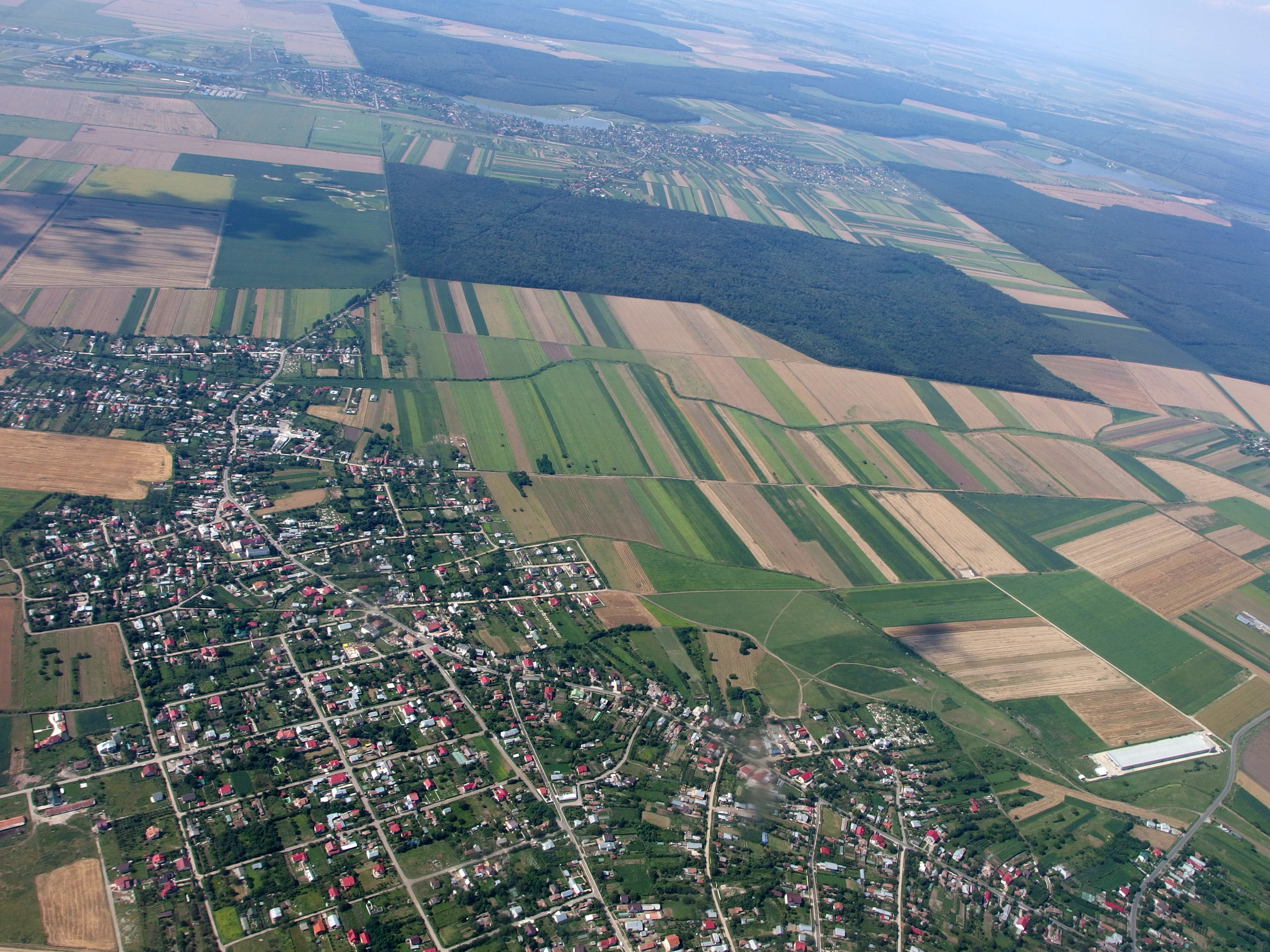
- Aerial view

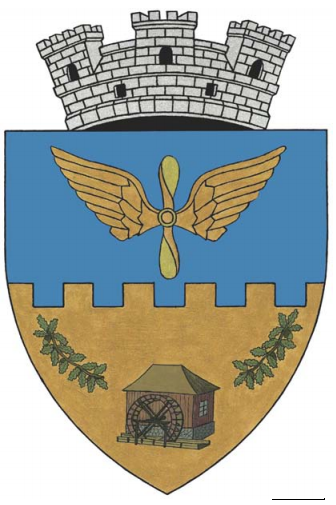
- Coat of arms

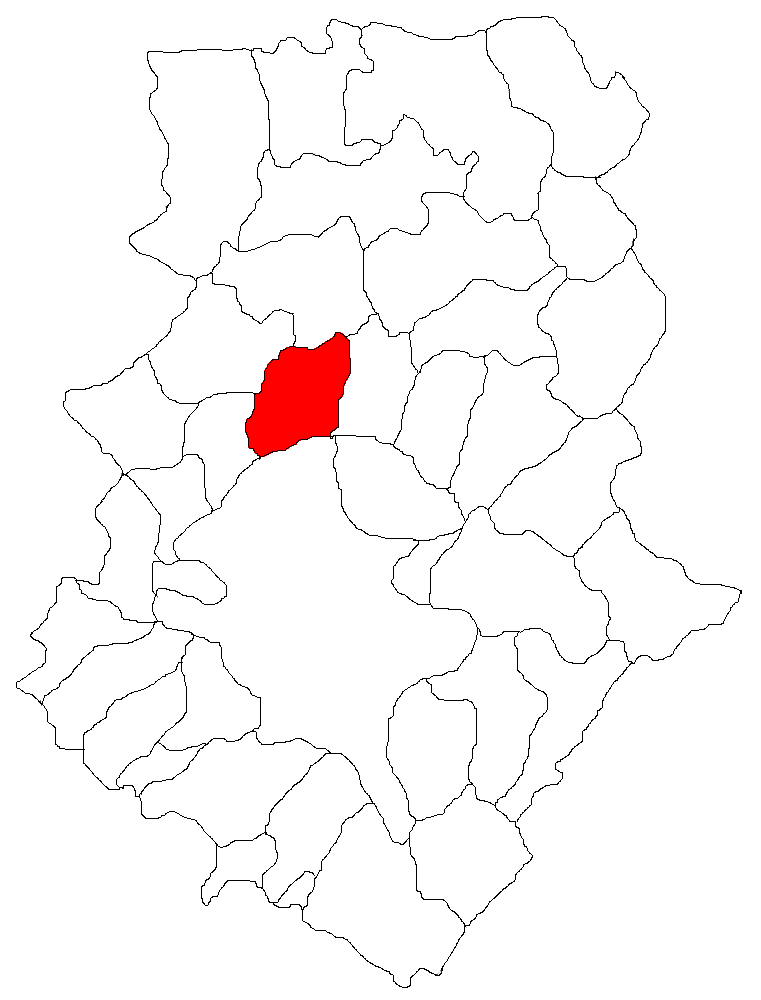
- Location in Ilfov County

- Location in Romania
- Coordinates: 44°33′0″N 26°4′12″E
- Country: Romania
- County: Ilfov

Government
  - Mayor (2024–2028): Constantin-Silviu Gheorghe (PNL)
- Area: 31.60 km^{2} (12.20 sq mi)
- Elevation: 91 m (299 ft)
- Population (2021-12-01): 21,750
  - Density: 688.3/km^{2} (1,783/sq mi)
- Time zone: UTC+02:00 (EET)
  - Summer (DST): UTC+03:00 (EEST)
- Postal code: 075100
- Area code: +(40) 021
- Vehicle reg.: IF
- Website: www.otopeniro.ro

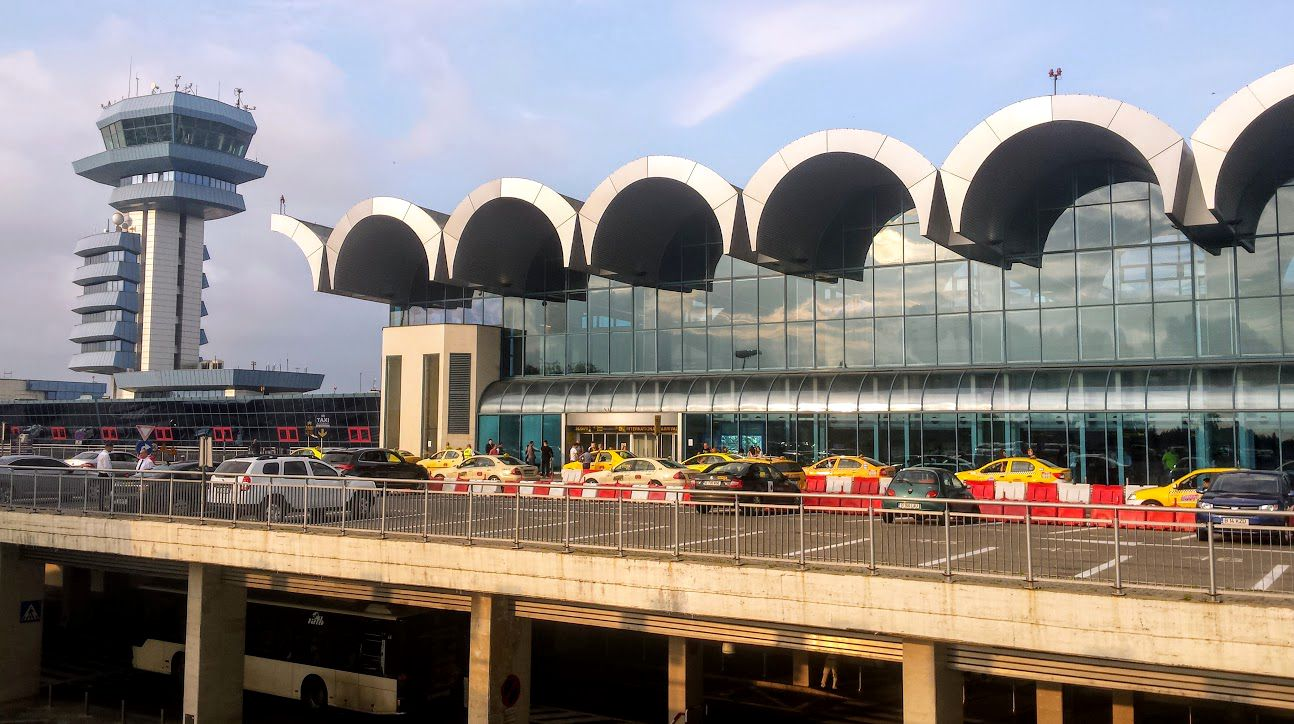
Henri Coandă International Airport, which is the location of the TAROM head office

Otopeni (Romanian pronunciation: [otoˈpenʲ]) is a town in Ilfov County, Muntenia, Romania, neighbouring the north of Bucharest along the DN1 road to Ploiești. It has 21,750 inhabitants, of which 99.0% are ethnic Romanians. One village, Odăile, is administered by the city.

Henri Coandă International Airport is located inside Otopeni. The head office of the airline TAROM is located inside the International Departures Terminal in the airport. In addition the head office of Țiriac Air is in Otopeni.

== History ==
Historical population
Year	Pop.	±%
2002	10,515	—
2011	13,861	+31.8%
2021	21,750	+56.9%
Source: Census data

The oldest discovered human settlements in the region are very old. On the occasion of excavations in 1966 to expand the nearby Henri Coandă International Airport, archaeologist Margaret Constantiniu of the History Museum of Bucharest identified fragments of ancient pottery and other objects that belonged to an important human settlements existing since the first period of the Iron Age. In an overlay was discovered another settlement are dated to the 10th century.

By charter of 14 February 1587, Mihnea Turcitul – voivode of Wallachia – gave Holy Trinity Monastery half to the village of Islazul and half to the village of Hodopeni (today Otopeni) mills and gypsies.

On 20 May 1620, Maria, great Băneasa, Holy Trinity monastery was given back (later Radu Vodă) half the village Hodopeni with Rumani, given by Master Villa, commanding Ruman listen. Historian Constantin C. Giurescu argued that the name Hodopeni comes from Hodopa or Hodoba.

At the end of the 19th century, Otopeni town was part of Dâmbovița County, Ilfov province, consisting of two villages, Lower Otopeni and Upper Otopeni, with 851 inhabitants in total. The commune operated a school with 29 students and two churches (one in each village). The village chambers were then part of the town Bucoveni, with 125 inhabitants.

Otopeni was transformed into a city as part of Nicolae Ceaușescu's Systematization plan. It replaced the semidetached houses with four-story high apartment buildings.

== Local government ==
As of 2024, the mayor of Otopeni is Constantin Silviu Gheorghe, from the National Liberal Party. The Otopeni Local Council has 17 councillors, even though before the 2008 local elections, it only had 15. It is considered to be a safe Liberal district, currently having the following party composition:

Party	Seats in 2004	Seats in 2008	Current Council
National Liberal Party	11	13	
Democratic Party	2	2	
Social Democratic Party	2	2	

== Natives ==
- Lucian Croitoru (born 1957), economist
- Mihai Dobrescu (born 1992), footballer
- Ioana Tudoran (born 1948), rower
