= Swimming at the 2025 World Aquatics Championships – Men's 200 metre backstroke =

Men's 200 metre backstroke at the 2025 World Aquatics Championships
- Venue: World Aquatics Championships Arena
- Location: Singapore Sports Hub, Kallang
- Dates: 31 July (heats and semifinals); 1 August (final)
- Competitors: 40 from 32 nations
- Winning time: 1:53.19

Medalists
gold medal	Hubert Kós	Hungary
silver medal	Pieter Coetze	South Africa
bronze medal	Yohann Ndoye-Brouard	France

The men's 200 metre backstroke event at the 2025 World Aquatics Championships was held from 31 July to 1 August 2025 at the World Aquatics Championships Arena at the Singapore Sports Hub in Kallang, Singapore.

== Background ==
Olympic champion and 2023 world champion Hubert Kós of Hungary entered as the second seed with the 1:54.26 he swam to win at the 2024 Olympics, which was one-hundredth slower than American Jack Aikins’ 1:54.25 from 2025 US Nationals. Also among the leading contenders were Keaton Jones of the United States, Apostolos Siskos of Greece, and Olympic bronze medalist Roman Mityukov of Switzerland, all of whom had swum under 1:55.00. Also in contention were Pieter Coetze of South Africa, Lukas Märtens of Germany, Thomas Ceccon of Italy, Oleksandr Zheltiakov of Ukraine, Ollie Morgan of Great Britain, and Dmitry Savenko of Russia, representing the Neutral Athletes B team.

== Qualification ==
Each National Federation was permitted to enter a maximum of two qualified athletes in each individual event, but they could do so only if both of them had attained the "A" standard qualification time. For this event, the "A" standard qualification time was 1:58.07 seconds. Federations could enter one athlete into the event if they met the "B" standard qualification time. For this event, the "B" standard qualification time was 2:02.20 seconds. Athletes could also enter the event if they had met an "A" or "B" standard in a different event and their Federation had not entered anyone else. Additional considerations applied to Federations who had few swimmers enter through the standard qualification times. Federations in this category could at least enter two men and two women to the competition, all of whom could enter into up to two events.

Top 10 fastest qualification times
Swimmer	Country	Time	Competition
Jack Aikins	United States	1:54.25	2025 United States Championships
Hubert Kós	Hungary	1:54.26	2024 Summer Olympics
Ryan Murphy	United States	1:54.33	2024 United States Olympic Trials
Hugo González	Spain	1:54.51	2024 Spanish Trials
Jackson Jones	United States	1:54.61	2024 United States Olympic Trials
Apostolos Siskos	Greece	1:54.66	2025 Greek Championships
Apostolos Christou	Greece	1:54.82	2024 Summer Olympics
Roman Mityukov	Switzerland	1:54.85	2024 Summer Olympics
Daniel Diehl	United States	1:55.08	2025 United States Championships
Mewen Tomac	France	1:55.38	2024 Summer Olympics

== Records ==
Prior to the competition, the existing world and championship records were as follows.

World record	Aaron Peirsol (USA)	1:51.92	Rome, Italy	31 July 2009
Competition record	Aaron Peirsol (USA)	1:51.92	Rome, Italy	31 July 2009

== Heats ==
The heats took place on 31 July at 10:31.

Rank	Heat	Lane	Swimmer	Nation	Time	Notes
1	5	8	Blake Tierney	Canada	1:55.17	Q, NR
2	4	2	Luke Greenbank	Great Britain	1:55.27	Q
3	4	5	Roman Mityukov	Switzerland	1:56.15	Q
4	5	2	Benedek Kovács	Hungary	1:56.40	Q
5	3	7	Lee Ju-ho	South Korea	1:56.50	Q
6	5	5	Apostolos Siskos	Greece	1:56.55	Q
6	5	7	Kodai Nishiono	Japan	1:56.55	Q
8	5	1	Antoine Herlem	France	1:56.58	Q
9	4	4	Hubert Kós	Hungary	1:56.71	Q
10	4	8	Joshua Edwards-Smith	Australia	1:56.77	Q
11	3	0	Christian Bacico	Italy	1:56.79	Q
11	3	8	Jan Čejka	Czech Republic	1:56.79	Q
13	4	7	Yohann Ndoye-Brouard	France	1:56.82	Q
14	3	1	John Shortt	Ireland	1:56.98	Q
15	3	4	Keaton Jones	United States	1:57.00	Q
16	4	3	Pieter Coetze	South Africa	1:57.11	Q
17	3	3	Thomas Ceccon	Italy	1:57.15	
18	4	1	Ethan Ekk	Canada	1:57.20	
19	3	6	Hidekazu Takehara	Japan	1:57.25	
20	4	6	Lukas Märtens	Germany	1:57.31	
21	5	3	Oliver Morgan	Great Britain	1:57.57	
22	3	2	Bradley Woodward	Australia	1:57.71	
23	2	3	Inbar Danziger	Israel	1:57.82	
24	5	4	Jack Aikins	United States	1:58.56	
25	5	9	Humberto Nájera	Mexico	1:58.65	
26	2	4	Iván Martínez	Spain	1:58.66	
27	4	9	Yeziel Morales	Puerto Rico	1:59.27	
28	5	0	Kai van Westering	Netherlands	1:59.93	
29	5	6	Dmitrii Savenko	Neutral Athletes B	2:00.20	
30	3	9	Mohamed-Yassine Ben Abbes	Tunisia	2:00.30	
31	2	1	Quah Zheng Wen	Singapore	2:00.58	
32	2	2	Jack Harvey	Bermuda	2:01.50	
33	3	5	Oleksandr Zheltyakov	Ukraine	2:02.17	
34	1	4	Edhy Vargas	Chile	2:02.29	NR
34	2	5	Yu Jingming	China	2:02.29	
36	2	7	Nikolass Deičmans	Latvia	2:02.50	
37	2	6	Hayden Kwan	Hong Kong	2:03.09	
38	2	8	Guðmundur Leo Rafnsson	Iceland	2:03.36	
39	1	5	Alexis Kpade	Benin	2:06.23	
40	1	3	Gleb Kovalenya	Kazakhstan	2:10.35	
	4	0	Ksawery Masiuk	Poland	Did not start	

== Semifinals ==
The semifinals took place on 31 July at 20:31.

Rank	Heat	Lane	Swimmer	Nation	Time	Notes
1	1	8	Pieter Coetze	South Africa	1:54.22	Q, AF
2	2	1	Yohann Ndoye-Brouard	France	1:54.47	Q, NR
3	2	2	Hubert Kós	Hungary	1:54.64	Q
4	2	5	Roman Mityukov	Switzerland	1:54.83	Q, NR
5	2	4	Blake Tierney	Canada	1:55.03	Q, NR
6	1	3	Apostolos Siskos	Greece	1:55.06	Q
7	1	7	Jan Čejka	Czech Republic	1:55.46	Q, NR
8	1	4	Luke Greenbank	Great Britain	1:55.64	Q
9	2	3	Lee Ju-ho	South Korea	1:55.70	NR
10	2	7	Christian Bacico	Italy	1:56.02	
11	2	6	Kodai Nishiono	Japan	1:56.04	
12	2	8	Keaton Jones	United States	1:56.20	
13	1	2	Joshua Edwards-Smith	Australia	1:56.28	
14	1	5	Benedek Kovács	Hungary	1:56.69	
15	1	1	John Shortt	Ireland	1:57.30	
16	1	6	Antoine Herlem	France	1:57.45	

== Final ==
The final took place on 1 August at 19:59.

Rank	Lane	Name	Nationality	Time	Notes
1st place, gold medalist(s)	3	Hubert Kós	Hungary	1:53.19	ER
2nd place, silver medalist(s)	4	Pieter Coetze	South Africa	1:53.36	AF
3rd place, bronze medalist(s)	5	Yohann Ndoye-Brouard	France	1:54.62	
4	2	Blake Tierney	Canada	1:55.09	
5	7	Apostolos Siskos	Greece	1:55.13	
6	1	Jan Čejka	Czech Republic	1:55.37	NR
7	6	Roman Mityukov	Switzerland	1:55.57	
8	8	Luke Greenbank	Great Britain	1:56.26	
