= Swimming at the 2024 Summer Olympics – Men's 200-metre backstroke =

Men's 200 metre backstroke at the Games of the XXXIII Olympiad
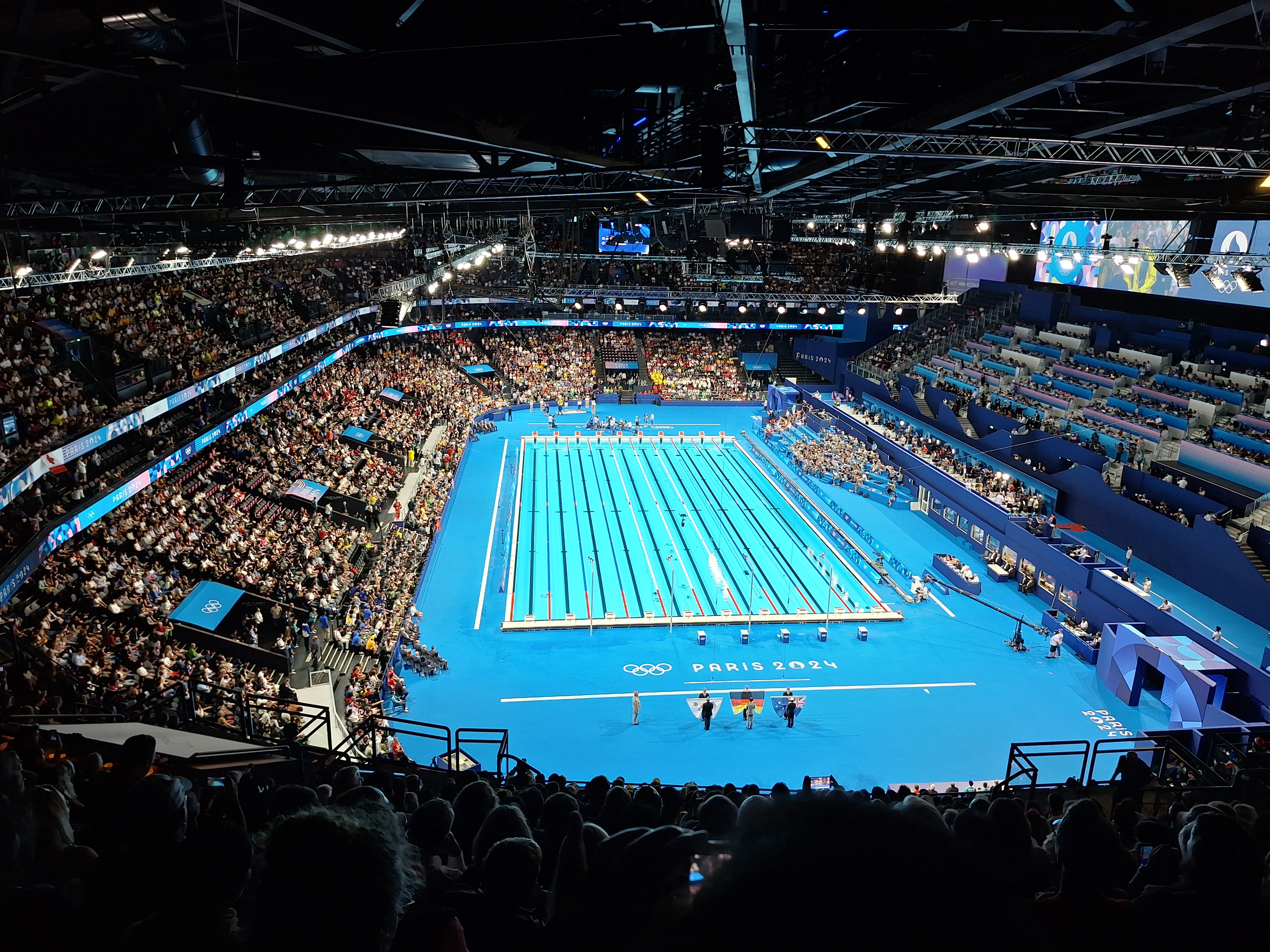
- Paris La Défense Arena after it was converted to a swimming pool for the swimming events
- Venue: Paris La Défense Arena
- Dates: 31 July 2024 (Heats and Semis); 1 August 2024 (Final)
- Competitors: 29 from 22 nations
- Winning time: 1:54.26

Medalists
1st place, gold medalist(s)		Hubert Kós	Hungary
2nd place, silver medalist(s)		Apostolos Christou	Greece
3rd place, bronze medalist(s)		Roman Mityukov	Switzerland

The men's 200 metre backstroke event at the 2024 Summer Olympics was held from 31 July to 1 August 2024 at Paris La Défense Arena, which was converted to an Olympic-size swimming pool for the swimming events.

The US' Ryan Murphy and Hungary's Hubert Kós were the considered the most likely to win prior to the event. Other contenders were Great Britain's Luke Greenbank, Hugo González of Spain and Roman Mityukov of Switzerland. Greenbank was eliminated in the heats (preliminary rounds) after getting disqualified for swimming more than 15 metres underwater, while Murphy did not qualify for the final.

In the final, Greece's Apostolos Christou was ahead for the first 150 metres, but Kós overtook him on the final 50 metres to win gold with a time of 1:54.26. Christou won the silver medal with a national record of 1:54.82, and Mityukov won the bronze with another national record of 1:54.85. France's fourth-place winner Mewen Tomac also broke his country's national record with 1:55.38, while the seventh-place winner, Pieter Coetze, broke the African record with 1:55.60. Christou's second-place finish made him the first Greek Olympic medallist in pool swimming since the first Olympics in 1896.

== Background ==
The US' Ryan Murphy won gold in the event at the 2016 Olympics, and then claimed silver at the 2020 Games. He also won the event at the 2022 World Championships. At the 2023 World Championships, Hungary's Hubert Kós won gold, with Murphy winning silver. Murphy qualified for the Paris Olympics with a time of 1:54.33 at the US Olympic Trials—the fastest time of the season, where Keaton Jones also qualified with 1:54.61, which was the third fastest time of the season.

Other competitors included Great Britain's Luke Greenbank, who finished third in the event at the previous Olympics; 2024 World Champion Hugo González of Spain, the 2023 Championships bronze medallist and 2024 Championships silver medallist; Roman Mityukov of Switzerland; and 2024 Championships bronze medallist Pieter Coetze of South Africa. Russia's defending Olympic champion Evgeny Rylov was not eligible to compete as World Aquatics required Russian athletes to have not shown any support for the Russian invasion of Ukraine to be able to compete as neutral athletes at the Games. Rylov had participated in a pro-war rally so was not eligible.

SwimSwam predicted Murphy would win and Kós would come second, while Swimming World predicted that it would be the opposite. Both publications predicted Hugo González would come third.

The event was held at Paris La Défense Arena, which was converted to a swimming pool for the swimming events.

== Qualification ==
Each National Olympic Committee (NOC) was permitted to enter a maximum of two qualified athletes in each individual event, but only if both of them had attained the Olympic Qualifying Time (OQT). For this event, the OQT was 1:57.50. World Aquatics then considered athletes qualifying through universality; NOCs were given one event entry for each gender, which could be used by any athlete regardless of qualification time, providing the spaces had not already been taken by athletes from that nation who had achieved the OQT. Finally, the rest of the spaces were filled by athletes who had met the Olympic Consideration Time (OCT), which was 01:58.09 for this event. In total, 27 athletes qualified through achieving the OQT, two athletes qualified through universality places and one athlete qualified through achieving the OCT.

Top 10 fastest qualification times
Swimmer	Country	Time	Competition
Hubert Kós	Hungary	1:54.14	2023 World Aquatics Championships
Ryan Murphy	United States	1:54.33	2024 United States Olympic Trials
Hugo González	Spain	1:54.51	2024 Spanish Summer Open Championships
Keaton Jones	United States	1:54.61	2024 United States Olympic Trials
Roman Mityukov	Switzerland	1:55.34	2023 World Aquatics Championships
Xu Jiayu	China	1:55.37	2022 Asian Games
Apostolos Siskos	Greece	1:55.42	2024 European Championships
Mewen Tomac	France	1:55.54	2024 French Elite Championships
Bradley Woodward	Australia	1:55.56	2023 Japan Open
Ádám Telegdy	Hungary	1:55.57	2024 Hungarian Championships

== Heats ==
Three heats (preliminary rounds) took place on 31 July 2024, starting at 11:21. (Note: All times are Central European Summer Time (UTC+2)) The swimmers with the best 16 times in the heats advanced to the semifinals. Mityukov qualified with the fastest time of 1:56.62. Kós, Murphy, González, Jones and Coetze were also among those that qualified. Greenbank won the fourth heat but was disqualified for swimming more than 15 metres underwater at the start of the race. China's Xu Jaiyu, the sixth seed for the event, did not show up to his heat. Denilson Cyprianos of Zimbabwe beat his country's national record in the event, lowering it to 2:01.91.

Results
Rank	Heat	Lane	Swimmer	Nation	Time	Notes
1	3	5	Roman Mityukov	Switzerland	1:56.62	Q
2	4	2	Lukas Märtens	Germany	1:56.89	Q
3	2	6	Pieter Coetze	South Africa	1:56.92	Q
4	4	4	Hubert Kós	Hungary	1:57.01	Q
5	3	4	Ryan Murphy	United States	1:57.03	Q
6	2	4	Hugo González	Spain	1:57.08	Q
7	2	7	Apostolos Christou	Greece	1:57.18	Q
8	3	7	Hidekazu Takehara	Japan	1:57.23	Q
9	4	3	Apostolos Siskos	Greece	1:57.26	Q
10	3	2	Lee Ju-ho	South Korea	1:57.39	Q
11	4	5	Keaton Jones	United States	1:57.54	Q
12	4	7	Oliver Morgan	Great Britain	1:57.56	Q
13	3	3	Mewen Tomac	France	1:57.62	Q
14	2	1	Thomas Ceccon	Italy	1:57.69	Q
15	2	2	Yohann Ndoye-Brouard	France	1:57.92	Q
16	4	6	Ádám Telegdy	Hungary	1:57.98	Q
17	3	1	Ksawery Masiuk	Poland	1:58.01	
18	1	4	Se-Bom Lee	Australia	1:58.30	
19	4	8	Blake Tierney	Canada	1:58.39	
20	3	6	Oleksandr Zheltyakov	Ukraine	1:58.41	
21	1	5	Kane Follows	New Zealand	1:58.63	
22	1	3	David Gerchik	Israel	1:58.79	
23	2	8	Kai van Westering	Netherlands	1:58.99	
24	3	8	Matteo Restivo	Italy	1:59.05	
25	2	3	Bradley Woodward	Australia	2:00.50	
26	1	6	Yeziel Morales	Puerto Rico	2:00.60	
27	1	2	Ziyad Saleem	Sudan	2:01.44	
28	1	7	Denilson Cyprianos	Zimbabwe	2:01.91	NR
	2	5	Xu Jiayu	China	DNS	
	4	1	Luke Greenbank	Great Britain	DSQ	

== Semifinals ==
Two semifinals took place on 31 July, starting at 21:47. The swimmers with the best eight times in the semifinals advanced to the final. Kós won the first semifinal with 1:55.96, and Mityukov won the second with 1:56.05. Murphy did not qualify.

Results
Rank	Heat	Lane	Swimmer	Nation	Time	Notes
1	1	5	Hubert Kós	Hungary	1:55.96	Q
2	2	4	Roman Mityukov	Switzerland	1:56.05	Q
3	2	5	Pieter Coetze	South Africa	1:56.09	Q
4	1	4	Lukas Märtens	Germany	1:56.33	Q
4	2	6	Apostolos Christou	Greece	1:56.33	Q
6	2	7	Keaton Jones	United States	1:56.39	Q
7	2	1	Mewen Tomac	France	1:56.43	Q
8	1	3	Hugo González	Spain	1:56.52	Q
9	1	1	Thomas Ceccon	Italy	1:56.59	
10	2	3	Ryan Murphy	United States	1:56.62	
11	1	2	Lee Ju-ho	South Korea	1:56.76	
12	1	7	Oliver Morgan	Great Britain	1:57.28	
13	1	8	Ádám Telegdy	Hungary	1:57.58	
14	2	2	Apostolos Siskos	Greece	1:57.77	
15	1	6	Hidekazu Takehara	Japan	1:58.03	
16	2	8	Yohann Ndoye-Brouard	France	1:58.65	

== Final ==
The final took place at 20:37 on 31 July. Greece's Apostolos Christou led the race at the 50 metre, 100 metre and 150 metre splits. At the 150 metre split he was over a second ahead of Kós in second place. Over the final 50 metres, Kós overtook Christou to claim the gold medal, finishing with a time of 1:54.26. Christou won the silver with a national record of 1:54.82, and Mityukov won the bronze with a national record of 1:54.85. France's Mewen Tomac finished fourth with 1:55.38, which was also a new national record. Coetze finished seventh with 1:55.60, which broke the African record set by George Du Rand in 2009. Rand's record was set with a supersuit, before they were banned in 2009 due to giving larger athletes a greater advantage.

Kós' win made him the second Hungarian Olympic gold medallist at the 2024 Games. Christou's second-place finish made him the first Greek Olympic medallist in pool swimming since the first Olympics in 1896. Sophie Kaufman from SwimSwam believed that his performance was "one of the biggest surprises of the meet" due to him being the oldest swimmer in the final and having the slowest personal best.

Results
Rank	Lane	Swimmer	Nation	Time	Notes
1st place, gold medalist(s)	4	Hubert Kós	Hungary	1:54.26	
2nd place, silver medalist(s)	2	Apostolos Christou	Greece	1:54.82	NR
3rd place, bronze medalist(s)	5	Roman Mityukov	Switzerland	1:54.85	NR
4	1	Mewen Tomac	France	1:55.38	NR
5	7	Keaton Jones	United States	1:55.39	
6	8	Hugo González	Spain	1:55.47	
7	3	Pieter Coetze	South Africa	1:55.60	AF
8	6	Lukas Märtens	Germany	1:55.97	

Statistics
Name	50 metre split	100 metre split	150 metre split	Time	Stroke rate (strokes/min)
Hubert Kós	27.06	56.30	1:25.38	1:54.26	40.4
Apostolos Christou	26.39	55.14	1:24.36	1:54.82	40.3
Roman Mityukov	27.16	56.36	1:25.75	1:54.85	43.5
Mewen Tomac	27.25	56.56	1:26.44	1:55.38	43.1
Keaton Jones	27.31	56.40	1:26.09	1:55.39	42.8
Hugo González	26.99	55.89	1:25.72	1:55.47	41.0
Pieter Coetze	26.83	56.53	1:25.73	1:55.60	41.7
Lukas Märtens	27.11	56.60	1:26.40	1:55.97	41.3
