= Swimming at the 2025 World Aquatics Championships – Men's 100 metre backstroke =

Men's 100 metre backstroke at the 2025 World Aquatics Championships
- Venue: World Aquatics Championships Arena
- Location: Singapore Sports Hub, Kallang
- Dates: 28 July (heats and semifinals); 29 July (final)
- Competitors: 59 from 51 nations

Medalists
gold medal	Pieter Coetze	South Africa
silver medal	Thomas Ceccon	Italy
bronze medal	Yohann Ndoye-Brouard	France

The men's 100 metre backstroke event at the 2025 World Aquatics Championships was held from 28 to 29 July 2025 at the World Aquatics Championships Arena at the Singapore Sports Hub in Kallang, Singapore. Pieter Coetze from South Africa became the world champion, setting also an African record.

== Background ==
The 2024 Olympic medalists were Thomas Ceccon of Italy, Xu Jiayu of China, and Ryan Murphy of the United States. Ceccon and Xu are both previous world champions and were both competing in Singapore, while Murphy was not. Russia’s Kliment Kolesnikov and Miron Lifintsev, both representing the Neutral Athletes B team, had the first and third fastest times of 2025, with 52.04 and 52.15, respectively. Lifintsev also won gold at the 2024 short course Worlds. Great Britain’s Oliver Morgan was ranked second in 2025 with 52.12 and had consistently improved since 2023, while Hungary’s Hubert Kós had swum 52.24 while competing across multiple events. Other contenders included Apostolos Christou of Greece, Ksawery Masiuk of Poland, Pieter Coetzee of South Africa, and Yohann Ndoye-Brouard of France. Eleven men had been under 53 seconds in 2025, with six under 52.5.

== Qualification ==
Each National Federation was permitted to enter a maximum of two qualified athletes in each individual event, but they could do so only if both of them had attained the "A" standard qualification time. For this event, the "A" standard qualification time was 53.94 seconds. Federations could enter one athlete into the event if they met the "B" standard qualification time. For this event, the "B" standard qualification time was 55.83 seconds. Athletes could also enter the event if they had met an "A" or "B" standard in a different event and their Federation had not entered anyone else. Additional considerations applied to Federations who had few swimmers enter through the standard qualification times. Federations in this category could at least enter two men and two women to the competition, all of whom could enter into up to two events.

Top 10 fastest qualification times (Note: Only including swimmers who were on the start list for this event)
Swimmer	Country	Time	Competition
Thomas Ceccon	Italy	52.00	2024 Summer Olympics
Kliment Kolesnikov	Neutral Athletes B	52.04	2025 Russian Championships
Oliver Morgan	Great Britain	52.12	2025 Aquatics GB Championships
Miron Lifintsev	Neutral Athletes B	52.15	2025 Russian Championships
Apostolos Christou	Greece	52.23	2024 European Championships
Hubert Kós	Hungary	52.24	2025 Hungarian Championships
Xu Jiayu	China	52.49	2025 Chinese Championships
Ksawery Masiuk	Poland	52.55	2025 Polish Championships
Pieter Coetze	South Africa	52.58	2024 Summer Olympics
Yohann Ndoye-Brouard	France	52.60	2024 Summer Olympics

== Records ==
Prior to the competition, the existing world and championship records were as follows.

World record	Thomas Ceccon (ITA)	51.60	Budapest, Hungary	20 June 2022
Competition record	Thomas Ceccon (ITA)	51.60	Budapest, Hungary	20 June 2022

== Heats ==
The heats took place on 28 July 10:23.

Rank	Heat	Lane	Name	Nationality	Time	Notes
1	6	6	Yohann Ndoye-Brouard	France	52.30	Q
2	5	4	Kliment Kolesnikov	Neutral Athletes B	52.57	Q
3	4	5	Hubert Kós	Hungary	52.60	Q
4	5	5	Apostolos Christou	Greece	52.61	Q
5	4	7	Christian Bacico	Italy	52.72	Q
6	6	5	Miron Lifintsev	Neutral Athletes B	52.77	Q
7	4	3	Pieter Coetze	South Africa	52.80	Q
8	5	3	Ksawery Masiuk	Poland	52.82	Q
9	4	4	Oliver Morgan	Great Britain	52.93	Q
10	6	2	Mewen Tomac	France	53.07	Q
11	4	6	Evangelos Makrygiannis	Greece	53.29	Q
12	5	7	Miroslav Knedla	Czech Republic	53.59	Q
13	6	4	Thomas Ceccon	Italy	53.65	Q
14	6	3	Xu Jiayu	China	53.73	Q
15	6	7	Ulises Saravia	Argentina	53.74	Q
16	5	0	Ádám Jászó	Hungary	53.78	Q
17	6	1	Lee Ju-ho	South Korea	53.79	
18	5	2	Tommy Janton	United States	53.87	
19	4	2	Jonathon Marshall	Great Britain	53.91	
20	4	1	Roman Mityukov	Switzerland	53.92	
21	6	8	Riku Matsuyama	Japan	53.94	
22	3	1	Finn Harland	New Zealand	54.17	
23	4	0	Adrián Santos	Spain	54.22	
24	4	8	Oleksandr Zheltyakov	Ukraine	54.24	
24	5	1	Kai van Westering	Netherlands	54.24	
26	6	0	John Shortt	Ireland	54.26	
27	5	8	Wang Shun	China	54.31	
28	3	4	Marcus Reyes-Gentry	Mexico	54.36	
29	2	5	Quah Zheng Wen	Singapore	54.39	
30	3	3	Joshua Edwards-Smith	Australia	54.52	
31	3	2	Inbar Danziger	Israel	54.59	
32	5	9	Guilherme Basseto	Brazil	54.68	
33	6	9	Denis Popescu	Romania	54.80	
34	3	5	Cole Pratt	Canada	54.81	
35	3	6	Mantas Kaušpėdas	Lithuania	54.98	
36	4	9	Robert Pedersen	Denmark	55.03	
37	3	7	Jack Harvey	Bermuda	55.40	
38	3	9	Yeziel Morales	Puerto Rico	55.41	
39	3	8	Luka Čarapović	Croatia	55.84	
40	2	4	Liam Carrington	Trinidad and Tobago	55.87	
41	2	3	Patrick Groters	Aruba	55.95	
42	2	6	Rémi Fabiani	Luxembourg	56.39	
43	2	8	Tonnam Kanteemool	Thailand	56.53	
44	5	6	Jack Aikins	United States	56.54	
45	2	9	Edhy Vargas	Chile	56.59	NR
46	2	0	Guðmundur Leo Rafnsson	Iceland	56.71	
47	3	0	Noe Pantskhava	Georgia	56.72	
48	2	2	Mohamed Ben Abbes	Tunisia	56.92	
49	1	8	Ahmad Safie	Lebanon	56.94	
50	2	7	Hayden Kwan	Hong Kong	57.02	
51	2	1	Nikolass Deičmans	Latvia	57.18	
52	1	4	Enkhtöriin Erkhes	Mongolia	57.25	NR
53	1	5	Alexis Kpade	Benin	57.50	NR
54	1	3	Zackary Gresham	Grenada	58.25	NR
55	1	6	Samiul Rafi	Bangladesh	58.36	NR
56	1	2	Joel Ling	Brunei	1:00.06	
57	1	7	Kokoro Frost	Samoa	1:02.15	
58	1	0	Mohammed Al-Wahaibi	Oman	1:05.92	
59	1	1	Zakhar Pilkevich	Tajikistan	1:08.81	

== Semifinals ==
The semifinals took place on 28 July at 19:19.

Rank	Heat	Lane	Name	Nationality	Time	Notes
1	2	5	Hubert Kós	Hungary	52.21	Q, NR
2	1	4	Kliment Kolesnikov	Neutral Athletes B	52.26	Q
3	2	6	Pieter Coetze	South Africa	52.29	Q, AF
4	2	1	Thomas Ceccon	Italy	52.35	Q
5	2	2	Oliver Morgan	Great Britain	52.41	Q
6	1	5	Apostolos Christou	Greece	52.44	Q
7	2	4	Yohann Ndoye-Brouard	France	52.47	Q
8	1	3	Miron Lifintsev	Neutral Athletes B	52.57	Q
9	1	6	Ksawery Masiuk	Poland	52.67	
10	2	3	Christian Bacico	Italy	52.72	
11	1	1	Xu Jiayu	China	53.14	
12	1	2	Mewen Tomac	France	53.15	
12	1	7	Miroslav Knedla	Czech Republic	53.15	NR
14	2	7	Evangelos Makrygiannis	Greece	53.36	
15	1	8	Ádám Jászó	Hungary	53.62	
16	2	8	Ulises Saravia	Argentina	54.32	

== Final ==
The final took place on 29 July at 19:59.

Rank	Lane	Name	Nationality	Time	Notes
1st place, gold medalist(s)	3	Pieter Coetze	South Africa	51.85	AF
2nd place, silver medalist(s)	6	Thomas Ceccon	Italy	51.90	
3rd place, bronze medalist(s)	1	Yohann Ndoye-Brouard	France	51.92	NR
4	4	Hubert Kós	Hungary	52.20	NR
5	2	Oliver Morgan	Great Britain	52.37	
6	5	Kliment Kolesnikov	Neutral Athletes B	52.38	
7	8	Miron Lifintsev	Neutral Athletes B	52.51	
8	7	Apostolos Christou	Greece	52.62	
