= 2024 World Aquatics Swimming Championships (25 m) – Men's 100 metre backstroke =

Swimming competition

Men's 100 metre backstroke at the 2024 World Aquatics Swimming Championships (25 m)
- Venue: Duna Arena
- Location: Budapest, Hungary
- Dates: 10 December (heats and semifinals); 11 December (final)
- Competitors: 54 from 46 nations
- Winning time: 48.76

Medalists
gold medal	Miron Lifintsev
silver medal	Hubert Kós	Hungary
bronze medal	Kacper Stokowski	Poland

The men's 100 metre backstroke event at the 2024 World Aquatics Swimming Championships (25 m) was held from 10 to 11 December 2024 at the Duna Arena in Budapest, Hungary.

== Records ==
Prior to the competition, the existing world and championship records were as follows.

World record	Coleman Stewart (USA)	48.33	Naples, Italy	29 August 2021
Competition record	Ryan Murphy (USA)	48.50	Melbourne, Australia	14 December 2022

== Background ==
The event featured a field led by recent performances at the Russian Short Course Championships, where Miron Lifintsev (49.26) and Pavel Samusenko (49.56) both swam under 49.60. Lifintsev and Samusenko were both competing as neutral athletes. Lifintsev also held the world junior record in long course (52.08), set at the 2024 Russian World Cup. Samusenko previously placed fourth in this event at the 2021 Short Course World Championships with a time of 49.65. France’s Mewen Tomac entered with a 49.72 from the 2023 European Short Course Championships but had only swum 50.28 this season. Poland’s Kacper Stokowski, a 2022 Worlds finalist, entered with a 49.87 and had earned multiple World Cup medals in 2024. Fellow Frenchman Yohann Ndoye-Brouard, an Olympic medley relay bronze medalist, was also in contention with a 49.96 entry time. Returning medalists from 2022, Lorenzo Mora (silver) and Isaac Cooper (bronze), also featured in the field.

SwimSwam predicted Lifintsev would win, Samusenko would come second, and Stokowski would come third.

== Results ==
=== Heats ===
The heats were started on 10 December at 09:54.

Rank	Heat	Lane	Name	Nationality	Time	Notes
1	5	0	Hubert Kós	Hungary	49.12	Q, NR
2	6	5	Kacper Stokowski	Poland	49.22	Q, NR
3	6	4	Miron Lifintsev	Neutral Athletes B	49.44	Q
4	4	2	Ruard van Renen	South Africa	49.73	Q
5	3	5	Blake Tierney	Canada	49.85	Q
6	5	4	Pavel Samusenko	Neutral Athletes B	50.20	Q
7	4	4	Mewen Tomac	France	50.22	Q
8	6	3	Lorenzo Mora	Italy	50.30	Q
9	6	7	Denis Popescu	Romania	50.35	Q
10	5	2	Ralf Tribuntsov	Estonia	50.38	Q, NR
11	6	6	Christian Bacico	Italy	50.48	Q
12	4	3	Isaac Cooper	Australia	50.60	Q
13	6	0	Jack Aikins	United States	50.64	Q
14	5	5	Yohann Ndoye-Brouard	France	50.80	Q
14	6	9	Ksawery Masiuk	Poland	50.80	Q
16	4	5	Masaki Yura	Japan	50.81	Q
17	4	8	Oliver Morgan	Great Britain	50.91	R
18	5	6	Ole Braunschweig	Germany	50.94	R
19	6	2	Miroslav Knedla	Czech Republic	51.13	
20	6	8	Cooper Morley	New Zealand	51.14	
21	6	1	Enoch Robb	Australia	51.21	
21	5	8	John Shortt	Ireland	51.21	
23	4	1	Iván Martínez	Spain	51.22	
24	4	6	Wang Gukailai	China	51.25	
25	3	1	Mantas Kaušpėdas	Lithuania	51.34	
26	3	2	Maximillian Wilson	United States Virgin Islands	51.37	NR
27	5	3	Andrei Ungur	Romania	51.58	
28	2	3	Hayden Kwan	Hong Kong	51.59	
29	3	4	Ádám Jászó	Hungary	51.65	
30	4	9	Roman Mityukov	Switzerland	51.74	
31	3	3	Oleksandr Zheltiakov	Ukraine	51.78	NR
32	5	1	Markus Lie	Norway	51.79	
33	4	0	Evangelos Makrygiannis	Greece	52.04	
34	3	8	Noe Pantskhava	Georgia	52.18	NR
35	3	0	Yeziel Morales	Puerto Rico	52.22	
36	3	6	Ulises Saravia	Argentina	52.26	
37	5	7	Xu Yifan	China	52.27	
38	3	7	Chuang Mu-lun	Chinese Taipei	52.38	
39	2	8	Dino Hasibović Sirotanović	Bosnia and Herzegovina	52.50	NR
40	5	9	Guðmundur Leo Rafnsson	Iceland	52.69	
41	3	9	Martin Perečinský	Slovakia	52.88	
42	2	6	Yegor Popov	Kazakhstan	53.10	
43	2	5	Ģirts Feldbergs	Latvia	53.16	
44	4	7	Rasim Oğulcan Gör	Turkey	53.19	
45	1	6	Akash Mani	India	54.05	
46	1	4	Samiul Islam Rafi	Bangladesh	54.37	NR
47	2	4	Joaquín Vargas	Peru	54.55	
48	2	1	Denilson Cyprianos	Zimbabwe	54.78	NR
49	2	9	Mikhail Kleshko	Uzbekistan	54.84	NR
50	2	7	Charles Hockin	Paraguay	54.85	
51	2	2	Farrel Tangkas	Indonesia	54.94	
52	2	0	Mohamad Zubaid	Kuwait	55.18	
53	1	5	Tendo Kaumi	Uganda	58.14	NR
54	1	3	Eid Al-Mujaini	United Arab Emirates	59.85	

=== Semifinals ===
The semifinals were started on 10 December at 18:34.

Rank	Heat	Lane	Name	Nationality	Time	Notes
1	2	4	Hubert Kos	Hungary	49.03	Q, NR
2	2	5	Miron Lifintsev	Neutral Athletes B	49.07	Q
3	1	4	Kacper Stokowski	Poland	49.20	Q, NR
4	1	6	Lorenzo Mora	Italy	49.54	Q
5	1	3	Pavel Samusenko	Neutral Athletes B	49.88	Q
6	1	5	Ruard Vanrenen	South Africa	49.89	Q
7	1	7	Isaac Cooper	Australia	50.01	Q
8	2	3	Blake Tierney	Canada	50.03	Q
9	2	6	Mewen Tomac	France	50.06	R
10	1	2	Ralf Tribuntsov	Estonia	50.25	R, NR
11	1	1	Yohann Ndoye-Brouard	France	50.33	
12	2	8	Ksawery Masiuk	Poland	50.43	
13	2	1	Jack Aikins	United States	50.46	
=14	2	2	Denis-Laurean Popescu	Romania	50.61	
=14	2	7	Christian Bacico	Italy	50.61	
16	1	8	Masaki Yura	Japan	50.95	

=== Final ===
The final was started on 11 December at 17:40.

Rank	Lane	Name	Nationality	Time	Notes
1st place, gold medalist(s)	5	Miron Lifintsev	Neutral Athletes B	48.76	WJ
2nd place, silver medalist(s)	4	Hubert Kos	Hungary	48.79	NR
3rd place, bronze medalist(s)	4	Kacper Stokowski	Poland	49.16	NR
4	2	Pavel Samusenko	Neutral Athletes B	49.20	
5	8	Blake Tierney	Canada	49.39	NR
6	6	Lorenzo Mora	Italy	49.54	
7	1	Isaac Cooper	Australia	49.60	
8	7	Ruard Vanrenen	South Africa	49.61	
