= Swimming at the 2024 European Aquatics Championships – Men's 4 × 100 metre medley relay =

Men's 4 × 100 metre medley relay at the 2024 European Aquatics Championships
- Venue: Sports Centre Milan Gale Muškatirović
- Dates: 23 June (heats and final)
- Competitors: 64 from 15 nations
- Teams: 15
- Winning time: 3:33.41

Medalists
gold medal	Bernhard Reitshammer; Valentin Bayer; Simon Bucher; Heiko Gigler	Austria
silver medal	Ksawery Masiuk; Jan Kałusowski; Jakub Majerski; Kamil Sieradzki; Kacper Stokowski; Adrian Jaśkiewicz; Dominik Dudys	Poland
bronze medal	Oleksandr Zheltiakov; Volodymyr Lisovets; Arsenii Kovalov; Illia Linnyk	Ukraine

The Men's 4 × 100 metre medley relay competition of the 2024 European Aquatics Championships was held on 23 June 2024.

== Records ==
Prior to the competition, the existing world, European and championship records were as follows.

	Team	Time	Location	Date
World record	United States	3:26.78	Tokyo	1 August 2021
European record	Great Britain	3:27.51	Tokyo	1 August 2021
European record	Italy	3:27.51	Budapest	25 June 2022
Championship record	Italy	3:28.46	Rome	17 August 2022

== Results ==
=== Heats ===
The heats were started at 10:22.
Qualification Rules: The 8 fastest from the heats qualify to the final.

Rank	Heat	Lane	Nation	Swimmers	Time	Notes
1	1	7	Ukraine	Oleksandr Zheltyakov (53.94); Volodymyr Lisovets (59.83); Arsenii Kovalov (51.88); Illia Linnyk (48.70)	3:34.35	Q
2	2	5	Austria	Bernhard Reitshammer (54.83); Valentin Bayer (1:00.04); Simon Bucher (51.52); Heiko Gigler (48.74)	3:35.13	Q
3	1	6	Hungary	Ádám Jászó (54.15); Dániel Sós (1:00.74); Hubert Kós (51.97); Dániel Mészáros (48.87)	3:35.73	Q
4	2	1	Poland	Kacper Stokowski (54.96); Jan Kałusowski (1:00.03); Adrian Jaśkiewicz (51.69); Dominik Dudys (49.25)	3:35.93	Q
5	1	5	Denmark	Robert Falborg Pedersen (56.25); Elias Elsgaard (1:00.02); Casper Puggaard (51.62); Frederik Lentz (48.49)	3:36.38	Q
6	1	3	Germany	Cornelius Jahn (55.45); Noel de Geus (1:00.21); Björn Kammann (52.49); Peter Varjasi (48.80)	3:36.95	Q
7	2	2	Serbia	Ognjen Kovačević (55.67); Uroš Živanović (1:02.04); Đurđe Matić (52.23); Nikola Aćin (48.61)	3:38.55	Q
8	1	2	Israel	David Gerchik (55.05); Kristian Pitshugin (1:00.50); Alexey Glivinskiy (53.44); Martin Kartavi (49.77)	3:38.76	Q
9	1	1	Greece	Apostolos Siskos (55.32); Arkadios Aspougalis (1:02.24); Anastasios Kougkoulos (53.20); Andreas Vazaios (49.23)	3:39.99	
10	2	3	Switzerland	Thierry Bollin (54.48); Gian-Luca Gartmann (1:01.61); Marius Toscan (55.10); Tiago Behar (49.55)	3:40.74	
11	2	7	Great Britain	Jack Skerry (55.60); Matthew Ward (1:04.60); Joshua Gammon (52.27); Alexander Painter (48.41)	3:40.88	
12	2	8	Sweden	Samuel Törnqvist (55.58); Linus Kahl (1:02.02); Albin Lövgren (53.87); Robin Hanson (49.57)	3:41.04	
13	2	6	Luxembourg	Rémi Fabiani (55.65); Finn Kemp (1:02.24); João Carneiro (55.01); Ralph Daleiden Ciuferri (48.50)	3:41.40	
14	2	4	Latvia	Valerijs Čurgelis (56.36); Daniils Bobrovs (1:02.19); Ronens Kermans (55.72); Kristaps Miķelsons (50.61)	3:44.88	
15	1	4	Slovenia	Primož Šenica Pavletič (57.60); Anže Ferš Eržen (1:03.89); Jaka Pušnik (56.28); Sašo Boškan (50.19)	3:47.96	

=== Final ===
The final was held at 19:55.

Rank	Lane	Nation	Swimmers	Time	Notes
1st place, gold medalist(s)	5	Austria	Bernhard Reitshammer (54.54); Valentin Bayer (59.87); Simon Bucher (51.42); Heiko Gigler (47.58)	3:33.41	
2nd place, silver medalist(s)	6	Poland	Ksawery Masiuk (54.50); Jan Kałusowski (59.74); Jakub Majerski (51.17); Kamil Sieradzki (48.03)	3:33.44	
3rd place, bronze medalist(s)	4	Ukraine	Oleksandr Zheltyakov (53.91); Volodymyr Lisovets (58.96); Arsenii Kovalov (51.90); Illia Linnyk (48.73)	3:33.50	NR
4	3	Hungary	Ádám Jászó (54.49); Dániel Sós (1:00.85); Hubert Kós (51.41); Szebasztián Szabó (48.30)	3:35.05	
5	2	Denmark	Robert Falborg Pedersen (56.26); Elias Elsgaard (59.90); Casper Puggaard (50.87); Frederik Lentz (48.27)	3:35.30	
6	7	Germany	Cornelius Jahn (54.97); Noel de Geus (1:00.22); Björn Kammann (52.05); Peter Varjasi (48.20)	3:35.44	
7	1	Serbia	Ognjen Kovačević (56.06); Uroš Živanović (1:01.86); Đurđe Matić (52.10); Nikola Aćin (48.21)	3:38.23	
8	8	Israel	David Gerchik (55.24); Kristian Pitshugin (1:00.22); Alexey Glivinskiy (53.46); Martin Kartavi (49.90)	3:38.82	
