= Swimming at the 2023 World Aquatics Championships – Men's 200 metre backstroke =

Men's 200 metre backstroke at the 2023 World Aquatics Championships
- Venue: Marine Messe Fukuoka
- Location: Fukuoka, Japan
- Dates: 27 July (heats and semifinals); 28 July (final)
- Competitors: 39 from 33 nations
- Winning time: 1:54.14

Medalists
| gold medal | Hubert Kós | Hungary |
| silver medal | Ryan Murphy | United States |
| bronze medal | Roman Mityukov | Switzerland |

The men's 200 metre backstroke competition at the 2023 World Aquatics Championships was held on 27 and 28 July 2023.

== Records ==
Prior to the competition, the existing world and championship records were as follows.

| World record | Aaron Peirsol (USA) | 1:51.92 | Rome, Italy | 31 July 2009 |
| Competition record | Aaron Peirsol (USA) | 1:51.92 | Rome, Italy | 31 July 2009 |

== Results ==
=== Heats ===
The heats were started on 27 July at 10:56.

| Rank | Heat | Lane | Name | Nationality | Time | Notes |
|---|---|---|---|---|---|---|
| 1 | 4 | 5 | Bradley Woodward | Australia | 1:57.14 | Q |
| 2 | 4 | 3 | Roman Mityukov | Switzerland | 1:57.24 | Q |
| 3 | 2 | 4 | Hubert Kós | Hungary | 1:57.27 | Q |
| 4 | 4 | 4 | Ryan Murphy | United States | 1:57.37 | Q |
| 5 | 4 | 6 | Apostolos Siskos | Greece | 1:57.40 | Q |
| 6 | 2 | 2 | Oliver Morgan | Great Britain | 1:57.61 | Q |
| 7 | 3 | 1 | Hugh McNeill | Canada | 1:57.73 | Q |
| 8 | 3 | 4 | Destin Lasco | United States | 1:57.84 | Q |
| 9 | 2 | 5 | Brodie Williams | Great Britain | 1:57.92 | Q |
| 10 | 4 | 1 | Hugo González | Spain | 1:57.99 | Q |
| 10 | 4 | 2 | Lee Ju-ho | South Korea | 1:57.99 | Q |
| 12 | 3 | 3 | Mewen Tomac | France | 1:58.09 | Q |
| 13 | 3 | 7 | Daiki Yanagawa | Japan | 1:58.14 | Q |
| 14 | 3 | 5 | Benedek Kovács | Hungary | 1:58.17 | Q |
| 15 | 3 | 2 | Antoine Herlem | France | 1:58.20 | Q |
| 16 | 3 | 6 | Hidekazu Takehara | Japan | 1:58.46 | Q |
| 17 | 2 | 6 | Matteo Restivo | Italy | 1:58.57 | |
| 18 | 4 | 7 | Andrew Jeffcoat | New Zealand | 1:59.01 | |
| 19 | 2 | 1 | João Costa | Portugal | 1:59.30 | |
| 20 | 3 | 9 | Berke Saka | Turkey | 1:59.48 | |
| 21 | 4 | 8 | Tao Guannan | China | 1:59.74 | |
| 22 | 3 | 8 | John Shortt | Ireland | 1:59.79 | |
| 23 | 2 | 7 | Lorenzo Mora | Italy | 1:59.99 | |
| 24 | 2 | 0 | Ziyad Ahmed | Sudan | 2:00.52 | |
| 25 | 2 | 8 | Yeziel Morales | Puerto Rico | 2:00.76 | |
| 26 | 4 | 0 | Erikas Grigaitis | Lithuania | 2:00.98 | |
| 27 | 1 | 2 | Denilson Cyprianos | Zimbabwe | 2:02.12 | NR |
| 28 | 1 | 5 | Mohamed Mohamady | Egypt | 2:02.23 | |
| 29 | 1 | 4 | Khiew Hoe Yean | Malaysia | 2:03.14 | |
| 30 | 4 | 9 | Tonnam Kanteemool | Thailand | 2:03.46 | |
| 31 | 3 | 0 | Srihari Nataraj | India | 2:04.42 | |
| 32 | 1 | 6 | Jack Harvey | Bermuda | 2:04.52 | |
| 33 | 1 | 3 | Armin Lelle | Estonia | 2:05.20 | |
| 34 | 2 | 9 | Trần Hưng Nguyên | Vietnam | 2:07.40 | |
| 35 | 1 | 8 | Merdan Atayev | Turkmenistan | 2:07.48 | |
| 36 | 1 | 7 | Matthieu Seye | Senegal | 2:08.44 | NR |
| 37 | 1 | 1 | Thomas Wareing | Malta | 2:12.57 | |
| 38 | 1 | 0 | Joel Ling | Brunei | 2:13.07 | |
| 39 | 1 | 9 | Ali Imaan | Maldives | 2:23.46 | |
| | 2 | 3 | Ksawery Masiuk | Poland | Did not start | |

=== Semifinals ===
The semifinals were held on 27 July at 21:33.

| Rank | Heat | Lane | Name | Nationality | Time | Notes |
|---|---|---|---|---|---|---|
| 1 | 1 | 4 | Roman Mityukov | Switzerland | 1:55.85 | Q, NR |
| 2 | 1 | 1 | Benedek Kovács | Hungary | 1:55.89 | Q |
| 3 | 2 | 5 | Hubert Kós | Hungary | 1:55.99 | Q |
| 4 | 1 | 5 | Ryan Murphy | United States | 1:56.02 | Q |
| 5 | 1 | 7 | Mewen Tomac | France | 1:56.05 | Q |
| 6 | 2 | 4 | Bradley Woodward | Australia | 1:56.16 | Q |
| 7 | 2 | 1 | Daiki Yanagawa | Japan | 1:57.23 | Q |
| 8 | 1 | 2 | Hugo González | Spain | 1:57.28 | Q |
| 9 | 1 | 3 | Oliver Morgan | Great Britain | 1:57.50 | |
| 10 | 2 | 8 | Antoine Herlem | France | 1:57.55 | |
| 11 | 2 | 2 | Brodie Williams | Great Britain | 1:57.93 | |
| 12 | 2 | 3 | Apostolos Siskos | Greece | 1:58.04 | |
| 13 | 2 | 7 | Lee Ju-ho | South Korea | 1:58.05 | |
| 14 | 1 | 8 | Hidekazu Takehara | Japan | 1:58.10 | |
| 15 | 2 | 6 | Hugh McNeill | Canada | 1:58.86 | |
| 16 | 1 | 6 | Destin Lasco | United States | 1:59.18 | |

=== Final ===
The final was started on 28 July at 20:59.

| Rank | Lane | Name | Nationality | Time | Notes |
|---|---|---|---|---|---|
| 1st place, gold medalist(s) | 3 | Hubert Kós | Hungary | 1:54.14 | NR |
| 2nd place, silver medalist(s) | 6 | Ryan Murphy | United States | 1:54.83 | |
| 3rd place, bronze medalist(s) | 4 | Roman Mityukov | Switzerland | 1:55.34 | NR |
| 4 | 2 | Mewen Tomac | France | 1:55.79 | |
| 5 | 5 | Benedek Kovács | Hungary | 1:55.85 | |
| 6 | 7 | Bradley Woodward | Australia | 1:56.29 | |
| 7 | 8 | Hugo González | Spain | 1:56.33 | |
| 8 | 1 | Daiki Yanagawa | Japan | 1:58.75 | |
