= Hubi =

Hubi may refer to:

- Hubert Hurkacz (born 1997), Polish tennis player
- Hubert Kós (born 2003), Hungarian swimmer
- Hübi, a village in the Lerik District, Azerbaijan
- Huzhou ink brush (pinyin: Húbǐ), a Chinese ink brush

== See also ==
- Hubie
