= Swimming at the 2026 European Aquatics Championships – Men's 200 metre backstroke =

Men's 200 metre backstroke at the 2026 European Aquatics Championships
- Venue: Paris Aquatic Centre
- Dates: 11 August (heats and semifinals); 12 August (final)

Medalists
gold medal	Hubert Kós	Hungary
silver medal	Apostolos Siskos	Greece
bronze medal	Thomas Ceccon	Italy

The Men's 200 metre backstroke competition of the 2026 European Aquatics Championships will be held on 11 and 12 August 2026.

== Records ==
Prior to the competition, the existing world, European and championship records were as follows:

	Name	Nation	Time	Location	Date
World record	Aaron Peirsol	United States	1:51.92	Rome	31 July 2009
European record	Hubert Kós	Hungary	1:53.19	Singapore	1 August 2025
Championship record	Evgeny Rylov	Russia	1:53.36	Glasgow	8 August 2018

== Results ==
=== Heats ===
The heats were held on 11 August at 10:28.

Rank	Heat	Lane	Swimmer	Nation	Time	Notes
1	4	7	Nathan Muratory	France	1:54.87	Q, WJ
2	3	2	Mewen Tomac	France	1:55.14	Q
3	4	4	Hubert Kós	Hungary	1:55.37	Q
4	3	4	Apostolos Siskos	Greece	1:55.64	Q
5	2	4	Yohann Ndoye-Brouard	France	1:55.91	
5	4	5	Roman Mityukov	Switzerland	1:56.91	Q
7	3	5	Luke Greenbank	Great Britain	1:56.03	Q
8	2	5	Jan Čejka	Czech Republic	1:56.11	Q
9	4	3	John Shortt	Ireland	1:56.50	Q
10	3	7	Flavio Bucca	Switzerland	1:56.63	Q
11	2	3	Aleksei Tkachev	Neutral Athletes B	1:56.86	Q
12	3	6	Georgii Smirnov	Neutral Athletes B	1:56.90	Q
13	2	6	Antoine Herlem	France	1:56.99	
13	3	3	Thomas Ceccon	Italy	1:56.99	Q
15	2	1	Miroslav Knedla	Czech Republic	1:57.15	Q
16	4	2	Cornelius Jahn	Germany	1:58.04	Q
17	4	6	Hugo González	Spain	1:58.11	Q
18	4	1	Zsombor Rácz	Hungary	1:58.21	Q
19	2	7	Aukan Goldin	Israel	1:58.26	
20	4	8	Diego Mira	Spain	1:58.29	
21	2	0	Eitan Ben Shitrit	Israel	1:58.40	
22	3	9	Filip Kosinski	Poland	1:58.49	
23	2	2	Daniele Del Signore	Italy	1:58.71	
24	1	4	Dominik Grudinskij	Portugal	1:58.76	
25	4	0	Daren Kirilov	Bulgaria	1:58.87	
27	2	8	Alexandru Constantinescu	Romania	1:59.62	
28	2	9	Primož Senica	Slovenia	1:59.64	
26	3	0	Ricardo Santos	Portugal	1:59.29	
29	3	1	Inbar Ono Danziger	Israel	1:59.83	
30	1	3	Ajjuub Ezzat	Finland	2:00.32	
31	4	9	Hendrik van der Leest	Netherlands	2:00.33	
32	1	6	Nikolass Deičmans	Latvia	2:00.54	
33	1	2	Guðmundur Leo Rafnsson	Iceland	2:01.42	
34	1	7	Michal Judickij	Czech Republic	2:01.55	
35	3	8	Cedric Büssing	Germany	2:01.94	
36	1	8	Dmitri Sillaste	Estonia	2:02.17	
37	1	5	Uladzimir Mamekin	Neutral Athletes A	2:02.27	
38	1	1	Tudor Iordache	Romania	2:02.90	
39	1	0	Zhulian Lavdaniti	Albania	2:09.67	

=== Semifinals ===
The semifinals were started on 11 August at 19:03.

Rank	Heat	Lane	Swimmer	Nation	Time	Notes
1	2	5	Hubert Kós	Hungary	1:52.30	Q, ER, CR
2	1	5	Apostolos Siskos	Greece	1:54.06	Q
3	2	6	Jan Čejka	Czech Republic	1:54.40	Q, NR
4	2	3	Roman Mityukov	Switzerland	1:54.85	Q
5	1	6	John Shortt	Ireland	1:55.31	Q, NR
6	2	2	Flavio Bucca	Switzerland	1:55.73	Q
7	2	8	Hugo González	Spain	1:55.75	Q
8	1	7	Thomas Ceccon	Italy	1:55.86	Q
9	2	4	Nathan Muratory	France	1:55.94	
10	1	4	Mewen Tomac	France	1:55.95	
11	1	1	Cornelius Jahn	Germany	1:56.26	
11	2	1	Miroslav Knedla	Czech Republic	1:56.26	
13	2	7	Georgii Smirnov	Neutral Athletes B	1:56.33	
14	1	2	Aleksei Tkachev	Neutral Athletes B	1:56.37	
15	1	3	Luke Greenbank	Great Britain	1:56.69	
16	1	8	Zsombor Rácz	Hungary	1:58.31	

=== Final ===
Rank	Lane	Swimmer	Nation	Time	Notes
1st place, gold medalist(s)	4	Hubert Kós	Hungary	1:53.08	
2nd place, silver medalist(s)	5	Apostolos Siskos	Greece	1:53.91	
3rd place, bronze medalist(s)	8	Thomas Ceccon	Italy	1:53.96	NR
4	6	Roman Mityukov	Switzerland	1:54.07	NR
5	3	Jan Čejka	Czech Republic	1:54.44	
6	1	Hugo González	Spain	1:54.75	
7	2	John Shortt	Ireland	1:55.86	
8	7	Flavio Bucca	Switzerland	1:56.20	
