= Swimming at the 2026 European Aquatics Championships – Men's 200 metre butterfly =

Men's 200 metre butterfly at the 2026 European Aquatics Championships
- Venue: Paris Aquatic Centre
- Dates: 14 August (heats and semifinals); 15 August (final)
- Winning time: 1:51.72

Medalists
| gold medal | Léon Marchand | France |
| silver medal | Richárd Márton | Hungary |
| bronze medal | Apostolos Siskos | Greece |

The Men's 200 metre butterfly competition of the 2026 European Aquatics Championships was held on 14 and 15 August 2026.

== Records ==
Prior to the competition, the existing world, European and championship records were as follows.

| | Time | Swimmer | Location | Date |
|---|---|---|---|---|
| World record | 1:50.34 | Kristóf Milák (HUN) | (Hungary) Budapest | 21 June 2022 |
| European record | 1:50.34 | Kristóf Milák (HUN) | (Hungary) Budapest | 21 June 2022 |
| Championship record | 1:51.10 | Kristóf Milák (HUN) | (Hungary) Budapest | 19 May 2021 |

== Results ==
=== Heats ===
The heats were started on 14 August 2026 at 10:18.
Qualification Rules: The 16 fastest from the heats qualify to the semifinals.

| Ranks | Heats | Lane | Swimmer | Country | Time | Notes |
|---|---|---|---|---|---|---|
| 1 | 2 | 4 | Alberto Razzetti | Italy | 1:54.64 | Q |
| 2 | 3 | 6 | Arbidel González | Spain | 1:55.07 | Q |
| 3 | 3 | 4 | Krzysztof Chmielewski | Poland | 1:55.77 | Q |
| 4 | 4 | 4 | Léon Marchand | France | 1:55.90 | Q |
| 5 | 2 | 3 | Andrea Camozzi | Italy | 1:55.95 | Q |
| 6 | 3 | 7 | Kregor Zirk | Estonia | 1:55.96 | Q |
| 7 | 3 | 5 | Federico Burdisso | Italy | 1:56.08 | |
| 8 | 4 | 5 | Michal Antoni Chmielewski | Poland | 1:56.11 | Q |
| 9 | 3 | 3 | Richárd Márton | Hungary | 1:56.15 | Q |
| 10 | 4 | 3 | Martin Espernberger | Austria | 1:56.59 | Q |
| 11 | 2 | 2 | Adrian Jaśkiewicz | Poland | 1:56.71 | |
| 12 | 4 | 6 | Ivan Shamshuryn | Neutral Athletes A | 1:56.72 | Q |
| 13 | 4 | 2 | Apostolos Siskos | Greece | 1:57.06 | Q |
| 14 | 2 | 6 | Hubert Kós | Hungary | 1:57.41 | Q |
| 15 | 4 | 1 | Vasco Morgado | Portugal | 1:57.57 | Q |
| 16 | 2 | 7 | Jack Cassin | Ireland | 1:57.79 | Q |
| 17 | 2 | 5 | Edward Mildred | Great Britain | 1:57.86 | Q |
| 18 | 3 | 2 | Isak Fernández | Spain | 1:57.92 | Q |
| 19 | 4 | 7 | Bjorn Kamman | Germany | 1:57.97 | R |
| 20 | 3 | 1 | Robert-Andrei Badea | Romania | 1:58.10 | R |
| 21 | 4 | 8 | Jan Zubik | Poland | 1:58.14 | |
| 22 | 4 | 0 | Enrico Sottile | Italy | 1:58.46 | |
| 23 | 2 | 8 | Marius Toscan | Switzerland | 1:58.50 | |
| 24 | 2 | 0 | Samuel Kostal | Slovakia | 1:59.06 | |
| 25 | 3 | 8 | Jan Jurčík | Czech Republic | 1:59.54 | |
| 26 | 4 | 9 | Hendrik van der Leest | Netherlands | 2:00.46 | |
| 27 | 3 | 9 | Florian Frippiat | Luxembourg | 2:00.95 | |
| 28 | 1 | 2 | Eetu Autio | Finland | 2:01.06 | |
| 29 | 3 | 0 | Lukas Peacock | Denmark | 2:01.42 | |
| 30 | 2 | 1 | Ihor Troianovskyi | Ukraine | 2:01.67 | |
| 31 | 1 | 4 | Noah Zemansky | Austria | 2:03.24 | |
| 32 | 1 | 6 | Nathan Cachia | Malta | 2:03.90 | |
| 33 | 2 | 9 | Ísak Dag Brisenfeldt | Faroe Islands | 2:04.27 | |
| 34 | 1 | 5 | Liam Custer | Ireland | 2:04.57 | |
| 35 | 1 | 3 | Holmar Gretarsson | Iceland | 2:04.68 | |
| 36 | 1 | 7 | Philipp Rizek | Austria | 2:05.62 | |

=== Semifinals ===
The semifinals were started on 14 August at 19:25.

Qualification Rules: The first 2 competitors of each semifinal and the remaining fastest (up to a total of 8 qualified competitors) from the semifinals advance to the final.

| Rank | Heat | Lane | Name | Nationality | Time | Notes |
|---|---|---|---|---|---|---|
| 1 | 1 | 5 | Léon Marchand | France | 1:53.95 | Q |
| 2 | 1 | 6 | Richárd Márton | Hungary | 1:54.47 | Q |
| 3 | 2 | 4 | Alberto Razzetti | Italy | 1:54.67 | Q |
| 4 | 1 | 7 | Hubert Kós | Hungary | 1:55.13 | Q |
| 5 | 1 | 4 | Arbidel González | Spain | 1:55.23 | Q |
| =6 | 2 | 5 | Krzysztof Chmielewski | Poland | 1:55.55 | Q |
| =6 | 2 | 7 | Apostolos Siskos | Greece | 1:55.55 | Q, NR |
| 8 | 2 | 6 | Michal Antoni Chmielewski | Poland | 1:55.88 | Q |
| 9 | 1 | 8 | Isak Fernández | Spain | 1:55.99 | |
| 10 | 1 | 3 | Kregor Zirk | Estonia | 1:56.04 | |
| 11 | 2 | 3 | Andrea Camozzi | Italy | 1:56.06 | |
| 12 | 2 | 8 | Edward Mildred | Great Britain | 1:56.43 | |
| 13 | 1 | 2 | Ivan Shamshuryn | Neutral Athletes A | 1:56.48 | |
| 14 | 2 | 2 | Martin Espernberger | Austria | 1:56.71 | |
| 15 | 2 | 1 | Vasco Morgado | Portugal | 1:57.07 | |
| 16 | 1 | 1 | Jack Cassin | Ireland | 1:57.66 | |

=== Final ===
The final was held on 15 August.

| Rank | Lane | Name | Nationality | Time | Notes |
|---|---|---|---|---|---|
| 1st place, gold medalist(s) | 4 | Léon Marchand | France | 1:51.72 | |
| 2nd place, silver medalist(s) | 5 | Richárd Márton | Hungary | 1:54.06 | |
| 3rd place, bronze medalist(s) | 7 | Apostolos Siskos | Greece | 1:54.13 | NR |
| 4 | 3 | Alberto Razzetti | Italy | 1:54.23 | NR |
| 5 | 1 | Krzysztof Chmielewski | Poland | 1:54.74 | |
| 6 | 6 | Hubert Kós | Hungary | 1:54.89 | |
| 7 | 2 | Arbidel González | Spain | 1:54.97 | NR |
| 8 | 8 | Michal Antoni Chmielewski | Poland | 1:55.42 | |
