= Swimming at the 2024 European Aquatics Championships – Men's 200 metre individual medley =

Men's 200 metre individual medley at the 2024 European Aquatics Championships
- Venue: Sports Centre Milan Gale Muškatirović
- Dates: 22 June (heats and semifinals); 23 June (final)
- Competitors: 33 from 18 nations
- Winning time: 1:57.21

Medalists
gold medal	Hubert Kós	Hungary
silver medal	Ron Polonsky	Israel
bronze medal	Berke Saka	Turkey

The Men's 200 metre individual medley competition of the 2024 European Aquatics Championships was held on 22 and 23 June 2024.

== Records ==
Prior to the competition, the existing world, European and championship records were as follows.

	Name	Nationality	Time	Location	Date
World record	Ryan Lochte	United States	1:54.00	Shanghai	24 July 2011
European record	Leon Marchand	France	1:54.82	Fukuoka	27 July 2023
Championship record	László Cseh	Hungary	1:56.66	Debrecen	23 May 2012

== Results ==
=== Heats ===
The heats were started on 22 June at 10:15.
Qualification Rules: The 16 fastest from the heats qualify to the semifinals.

Rank	Heat	Lane	Name	Nationality	Time	Notes
1	3	4	Hubert Kós	Hungary	1:58.75	Q
2	4	3	Dominik Török	Hungary	1:59.11	Q
3	4	4	Gábor Zombori	Hungary	1:59.52	
4	4	5	Ron Polonsky	Israel	1:59.57	Q
5	3	3	Balázs Holló	Hungary	1:59.76	
6	3	6	Vadym Naumenko	Ukraine	2:00.97	Q
7	2	2	Daniil Giourtzidis	Greece	2:01.01	Q
8	2	4	Jérémy Desplanches	Switzerland	2:01.32	Q
9	2	6	Yakov Toumarkin	Israel	2:01.33	Q
10	4	6	Andreas Vazaios	Greece	2:01.39	Q
11	2	3	Eitan Ben Shitrit	Israel	2:01.41	
12	3	5	Berke Saka	Turkey	2:01.50	Q
13	2	5	Gabriel Lopes	Portugal	2:01.51	Q
14	4	7	Gian-Luca Gartmann	Switzerland	2:01.58	Q
15	3	7	Anže Ferš Eržen	Slovenia	2:01.95	Q
16	4	1	Sebastian Lunak	Czech Republic	2:02.26	Q
17	3	2	Marius Zobel	Germany	2:03.17	Q
18	4	2	Finn Wendland	Germany	2:03.24	Q
19	3	8	Juraj Barcot	Croatia	2:03.39	Q
20	3	1	Samuel Tornqvist	Sweden	2:03.80	
21	3	9	Max Halbeisen	Austria	2:04.39	
22	1	4	Marius Toscan	Switzerland	2:04.44	
23	2	0	Ronny Brännkärr	Finland	2:04.54	
24	2	9	Oleksii Hrabarov	Ukraine	2:04.88	
25	2	8	Richard Nagy	Slovakia	2:04.89	
26	4	9	Kristaps Miķelsons	Latvia	2:05.21	
27	1	5	Ronens Kermans	Latvia	2:05.85	
28	4	0	Finn Murray Moses Kemp	Luxembourg	2:06.22	
29	1	6	Moritz Baumgartner	Austria	2:07.00	
30	2	7	Alexey Glivinskiy	Israel	2:07.90	
31	1	3	Matija Rađenović	Serbia	2:11.09	
	2	1	Jakub Bursa	Czech Republic	DSQ	
	3	0	František Jablčník	Slovakia	DSQ	
	4	0	Danny Schmidt	Germany	Did not start	

=== Semifinals ===
The semifinals were started on 22 June at 19:57.
Qualification Rules: The first 2 competitors of each semifinal and the remaining fastest (up to a total of 8 qualified competitors) from the semifinals advance to the final.

Rank	Heat	Lane	Name	Nationality	Time	Notes
1	2	5	Ron Polonsky	Israel	1:57.01	Q, NR
2	2	4	Hubert Kós	Hungary	1:58.12	Q
3	2	2	Berke Saka	Turkey	1:58.56	Q
4	1	4	Dominik Török	Hungary	1:59.07	Q
5	1	3	Jérémy Desplanches	Switzerland	1:59.27	Q
6	1	5	Vadym Naumenko	Ukraine	1:59.33	Q, NR
7	1	2	Gabriel Lopes	Portugal	1:59.63	Q
8	2	3	Daniil Giourtzidis	Greece	1:59.71	Q
9	2	7	Gian-Luca Gartmann	Switzerland	2:00.39	
10	1	6	Andreas Vazaios	Greece	2:00.53	
11	2	8	Finn Wendland	Germany	2:01.03	
12	2	6	Yakov Toumarkin	Israel	2:01.33	
13	1	7	Anže Ferš Eržen	Slovenia	2:01.78	
14	2	1	Sebastian Lunak	Czech Republic	2:02.29	
15	1	8	Juraj Barcot	Croatia	2:02.45	
16	1	1	Marius Zobel	Germany	2:02.94	

=== Final ===
The final was held on 23 June at 19:07.

Rank	Lane	Name	Nationality	Time	Notes
1st place, gold medalist(s)	5	Hubert Kós	Hungary	1:57.21	
2nd place, silver medalist(s)	4	Ron Polonsky	Israel	1:57.36	
3rd place, bronze medalist(s)	3	Berke Saka	Turkey	1:58.62	
4	6	Dominik Török	Hungary	1:58.89	
5	2	Jérémy Desplanches	Switzerland	1:59.04	
6	1	Gabriel Lopes	Portugal	1:59.89	
7	7	Vadym Naumenko	Ukraine	2:00.47	
8	8	Daniil Giourtzidis	Greece	2:01.31	
