= List of Zimbabwean records in swimming =

The Zimbabwean records in swimming are ratified by the Zimbabwe Aquatic Union (ZAU) for the fastest performances by Zimbabwean nationals in both long course (50 m) and short course (25 m) pools.

Records marked with a hash (#) are currently awaiting ratification by ZAU or have been obtained since the last version of the official lists. All records were achieved in finals unless otherwise specified.

== Long course (50 m) ==
=== Men ===
Event	Time		Name	Club	Date	Meet	Location	Ref
50 m freestyle	22.77	h	Peter Wetzlar	Zimbabwe	26 July 2019	World Championships	Gwangju, South Korea	
100 m freestyle	50.31	h	Peter Wetzlar	Zimbabwe	27 July 2021	Olympic Games	Tokyo, Japan	
200 m freestyle	1:51.85	h	Sean Gunn	Zimbabwe	11 April 2016	South African Championships	Durban, South Africa	
400 m freestyle	4:07.40		Ivor Le Roux	-	1992	-	Luxembourg	
800 m freestyle	8:41.73		Damon Lee	-	10 December 2012	KZN Championships	Durban, South Africa	
1500 m freestyle	16:38.28		R Duncan	-	1980	-	Cape Town, South Africa	
50 m backstroke	26.39	†	Denilson Cyprianos	Zimbabwe	15 October 2021	African Championships	Accra, Ghana	
100 m backstroke	56.32		Denilson Cyprianos	Zimbabwe	12 March 2024	African Games	Accra, Ghana	
200 m backstroke	2:01.91	h	Denilson Cyprianos	Zimbabwe	31 July 2024	Olympic Games	Paris, France	
50 m breaststroke	28.85	=, h	James Lawson	Zimbabwe	4 August 2015	World Championships	Kazan, Russia	
50 m breaststroke	28.85	=, h	James Lawson	Zimbabwe	25 July 2017	World Championships	Budapest, Hungary	
100 m breaststroke	1:03.11		James Lawson	Zimbabwe	6 September 2015	African Games	Brazzaville, Congo	
200 m breaststroke	2:18.23	h	Liam Davis	Edinburgh University	8 March 2024	Edinburgh International Meet	Edinburgh, United Kingdom	
50 m butterfly	24.46		Peter Wetzlar	Zimbabwe	22 August 2019	African Games	Casablanca, Morocco	
100 m butterfly	54.89	h	Grant Beahan	Zimbabwe	31 July 2009	World Championships	Rome, Italy	
200 m butterfly	2:06.37		Grant Beahan	Zimbabwe	14 May 2011	Charlotte UltraSwim	Charlotte, United States	
200 m individual medley	2:10.14	h	James Lawson	Zimbabwe	7 November 2015	World Cup	Dubai, United Arab Emirates	
400 m individual medley	4:37.31		Christopher Shaw	-	12 June 1998	Scottish Championships	Edinburgh, United Kingdom	
4×50 m freestyle relay	1:35.72			Zimbabwe	December 2014	AUSC Region 5 Youth Games	Bulawayo, Zimbabwe	
4×100 m freestyle relay	3:33.43		- Denilson Cyprianos (53.02); Benjamin Rorke (53.60); Bjorn Mhlanga (54.12); Joash McKonie (52.69)	Zimbabwe	12 March 2024	African Games	Accra, Ghana	
4×200 m freestyle relay	7:59.00		Denilson Cyprianos (1:57.94); Joash McKonie (1:57.80); Benjamin Rorke (2:02.26); Bjorn Mhlanga (2:01.00)	Zimbabwe	11 March 2024	African Games	Accra, Ghana	
4×50 m medley relay					-			
4×100 m medley relay	3:53.80		Denilson Cyprianos (56.86); Liam Davis (1:07.15); Joash Saundell (56.60); Benjamin Rorke (53.19)	Zimbabwe	13 March 2024	African Games	Accra, Ghana	

Legend: # – Record awaiting ratification by Zimbabwe Aquatic Union; WR – World record; AF – African record;
Records not set in finals: h – heat; sf – semifinal; r – relay 1st leg; rh – relay heat 1st leg; b – B final; † – en route to final mark; so – swim-off; tt – time trial

=== Women ===
Event	Time		Name	Club	Date	Meet	Location	Ref
50 m freestyle	25.93		Paige van der Westhuizen	University of Stirling	28 June 2026	Scottish Championships	Edinburgh, United Kingdom	
100 m freestyle	55.73		Kirsty Coventry	-	16 July 2008	US Sectionals	Austin, United States	
200 m freestyle	1:57.04		Kirsty Coventry	-	7 June 2008	Texas Senior Circuit	Austin, United States	
400 m freestyle	4:08.50		Kirsty Coventry	-	6 June 2008	Texas Senior Circuit	Austin, United States	
800 m freestyle	8:43.89		Kirsty Coventry	Zimbabwe	14 July 2007	African Games	Algiers, Algeria	
1500 m freestyle	17:31.88		Kirsten Lapham	Zimbabwe	10 September 2011	African Games	Maputo, Mozambique	
50 m backstroke	28.08		Kirsty Coventry	Zimbabwe	13 June 2015	Mare Nostrum	Monte Carlo, Monaco	
100 m backstroke	58.77	sf, AF	Kirsty Coventry	Zimbabwe	11 August 2008	Olympic Games	Beijing, China	
200 m backstroke	2:04.81	AF	Kirsty Coventry	Zimbabwe	1 August 2009	World Championships	Rome, Italy	
50 m breaststroke	33.14	h	Paige van der Westhuizen	Zimbabwe	8 May 2026	African Championships	Oran, Algeria	
100 m breaststroke	1:11.86		Kirsty Coventry	Zimbabwe	16 July 2007	African Games	Algiers, Algeria	
200 m breaststroke	2:37.77	h	Maxine Heard	Zimbabwe	30 July 2009	World Championships	Rome, Italy	
50 m butterfly	27.66		Anje van As	Zimbabwe	6 May 2026	African Championships	Oran, Algeria	
100 m butterfly	1:00.43		Anje van As	Aquatics Gauteng Tshwane	15 April 2026	South African Championships	Gqeberha, South Africa	
200 m butterfly	2:14.45		Anje van As	Aquatics Gauteng Tshwane	17 April 2026	South African Championships	Gqeberha, South Africa	
200 m individual medley	2:08.59	AF	Kirsty Coventry	Zimbabwe	13 August 2008	Olympic Games	Beijing, China	
400 m individual medley	4:29.89	AF	Kirsty Coventry	Zimbabwe	9 August 2008	Olympic Games	Beijing, China	
4×50m freestyle relay	1:51.35			Zimbabwe	March 1994	-	Durban, South Africa	
4×100m freestyle relay	3:52.35		Alexis Johnsen (58.95); Mikamia Macwabarara (1:00.29); Paige van der Westhuizen (56.53); Anje van As (56.58)	Zimbabwe	8 May 2026	African Championships	Oran, Algeria	
4×200m freestyle relay	8:35.74	h	Nicole Horn (2:08.17); Kirsten Lapham (2:08.66); Moira Fraser (2:10.80); Kimberley Eeson (2:08.11)	Zimbabwe	30 July 2009	World Championships	Rome, Italy	
4×50m medley relay					-			
4×100m medley relay	4:21.60			Zimbabwe	July 2007	African Games	Algiers, Algeria	

Legend: # – Record awaiting ratification by Zimbabwe Aquatic Union; WR – World record; AF – African record;
Records not set in finals: h – heat; sf – semifinal; r – relay 1st leg; rh – relay heat 1st leg; b – B final; † – en route to final mark; so – swim-off; tt – time trial

=== Mixed relay ===
Event	Time	Name	Club	Date	Meet	Location	Ref
4×100m freestyle relay	3:42.05	Peter Wetzlar (52.89); Tarryn Rennie (1:00.53); Kirsty Coventry (57.91); Sean Gunn (50.72)	Zimbabwe	7 September 2015	African Games	Brazzaville, Congo	
4×100m medley relay	4:00.78	Kirsty Coventry (1:02.10); James Lawson (1:02.92); Tarryn Rennie (1:05.08); Sean Gunn (50.68)	Zimbabwe	10 September 2015	African Games	Brazzaville, Congo	

Legend: # – Record awaiting ratification by Zimbabwe Aquatic Union; WR – World record; AF – African record;
Records not set in finals: h – heat; so – swim-off

== Short course (25 m) ==
=== Men ===
Event	Time		Name	Club	Date	Meet	Location	Ref
50m freestyle	22.76	h	Cory Werrett	Zimbabwe	17 October 2025	World Cup	Westmont, United States	
100m freestyle	49.80	h	Grant Beahan	Zimbabwe	18 December 2010	World Championships	Dubai, United Arab Emirates	
200m freestyle	1:49.96	h	Grant Beahan	Zimbabwe	15 December 2010	World Championships	Dubai, United Arab Emirates	
400m freestyle	4:05.45		Ryan Franceys	Zimbabwe	17 October 2025	World Cup	Westmont, United States	
800m freestyle	8:38.36		Damon Lee	-	August 2012	-	Perth, Australia	
1500m freestyle	16:21.06		Damon Lee	-	August 2012	-	Perth, Australia	
50m backstroke	26.09		Denilson Cyprianos	-	November 2020	-	Bulawayo, Zimbabwe	
100m backstroke	54.78	h	Denilson Cyprianos	Zimbabwe	10 December 2024	World Championships	Budapest, Hungary	
200m backstroke	1:58.02	h	Denilson Cyprianos	Zimbabwe	15 December 2024	World Championships	Budapest, Hungary	
50m breaststroke	28.00	h	Timothy Ferris	Zimbabwe	18 December 2010	World Championships	Dubai, United Arab Emirates	
100m breaststroke	1:01.31	h	Liam O'Hara	Zimbabwe	14 December 2022	World Championships	Melbourne, Australia	
200m breaststroke	2:13.54		Liam Davis	Plymouth Leander	December 2019	England Winter Championships	Sheffield, Great Britain	
50m butterfly	24.59		Joash McKonie	-	November 2020	-	Bulawayo, Zimbabwe	
100m butterfly	54.53	h	Grant Beahan	Zimbabwe	15 December 2010	World Championships	Dubai, United Arab Emirates	
200m butterfly	1:59.79	h	Grant Beahan	Zimbabwe	19 December 2010	World Championships	Dubai, United Arab Emirates	
100m individual medley	57.47	h	Nicholas James	Zimbabwe	18 December 2010	World Championships	Dubai, United Arab Emirates	
200m individual medley	2:04.90	h	Liam O'Hara	Zimbabwe	13 December 2022	World Championships	Melbourne, Australia	
400m individual medley	4:53.87		Damon Lee	-	July 2012	-	Perth, Australia	
4×50m freestyle relay								
4×100m freestyle relay								
4×200m freestyle relay								
4×50m medley relay								
4×100m medley relay								

Legend: # – Record awaiting ratification by Zimbabwe Aquatic Union; WR – World record; AF – African record;
Records not set in finals: h – heat; sf – semifinal; r – relay 1st leg; rh – relay heat 1st leg; b – B final; † – en route to final mark; so – swim-off; tt – time trial

=== Women ===
Event	Time		Name	Club	Date	Meet	Location	Ref
50 m freestyle	25.39		Paige van der Westhuizen	University of Stirling	13 December 2025	Scottish Championships	Edinburgh, United Kingdom	
100 m freestyle	54.93		Samantha Richter	North Shore Swimming	12 November 2010	State Insurance New Zealand Championships	Mount Maunganui, New Zealand	
200 m freestyle	1:58.44		Kirsty Coventry	-	18 March 2004	NCAA Division I Championships	College Station, United States	
400 m freestyle	4:12.80		Kirsty Coventry	Zimbabwe	13 November 2011	-	Lyon, France	
800 m freestyle	9:05.90		Kimberley Eeson	Zimbabwe	11 November 2005	World Cup	Durban, South Africa	
1500 m freestyle	19:52.54		N Bradshaw	-	January 2002	-	Bulawayo, Zimbabwe	
50 m backstroke	26.85	AF	Kirsty Coventry	Zimbabwe	13 April 2008	World Championships	Manchester, United Kingdom	
100 m backstroke	57.10		Kirsty Coventry	Zimbabwe	10 April 2008	World Championships	Manchester, United Kingdom	
200 m backstroke	2:00.91	AF	Kirsty Coventry	Zimbabwe	11 April 2008	World Championships	Manchester, United Kingdom	
50m breaststroke	32.48	h	Paige van der Westhuizen	University of Stirling	12 December 2025	Scottish Championships	Edinburgh, United Kingdom	
100m breaststroke	1:11.02	h	Maxine Heard	Zimbabwe	August 2009	South African Championships	Pietermaritzburg, South Africa	
200m breaststroke	2:35.40		Maxine Heard	Zimbabwe	August 2009	South African Championships	Pietermaritzburg, South Africa	
50m butterfly	27.83	h	Heather Brand	Zimbabwe	10 April 2008	World Championships	Manchester, United Kingdom	
100m butterfly	59.94	h	Heather Brand	Zimbabwe	12 April 2008	World Championships	Manchester, United Kingdom	
200m butterfly	2:13.49	h	Heather Brand	Zimbabwe	9 April 2008	World Championships	Manchester, United Kingdom	
100m individual medley	59.77		Kirsty Coventry	Zimbabwe	11 April 2008	World Championships	Manchester, United Kingdom	
200m individual medley	2:06.13		Kirsty Coventry	Zimbabwe	12 April 2008	World Championships	Manchester, United Kingdom	
400m individual medley	4:26.52		Kirsty Coventry	Zimbabwe	9 April 2008	World Championships	Manchester, United Kingdom	
4×50m freestyle relay								
4×100m freestyle relay								
4×200m freestyle relay								
4×50m medley relay								
4×100m medley relay								

Legend: # – Record awaiting ratification by Zimbabwe Aquatic Union; WR – World record; AF – African record;
Records not set in finals: h – heat; sf – semifinal; r – relay 1st leg; rh – relay heat 1st leg; b – B final; † – en route to final mark; so – swim-off; tt – time trial
