= Hubie =

Hubie is a given name, often a nickname for Hubert. People with the name include:

== People ==
- Hubie Brooks (born 1956), American baseball player
- Hubie Brown (born 1933), American basketball coach
- Hubert Davis (born 1970), American basketball coach
- Hubert Green (1946–2018), American golfer
- Hubie McDonough (born 1963), American ice hockey player
- Hubie Smith, American basketball coach

== Fictional characters ==
- Hubie, a cartoon character in the 1995 animated film The Pebble and the Penguin
- Hubie, cartoon rodent and partner of Bertie in Looney Tunes and Merrie Melodies
- Hubie Dubois, main character in the 2020 film Hubie Halloween played by Adam Sandler

== See also ==
- Hubi
