= Swimming at the 2022 European Aquatics Championships – Men's 200 metre individual medley =

Men's 200 metre individual medley at the 2022 European Aquatics Championships
- Venue: Foro Italico
- Dates: 16 August (heats and semifinals); 17 August (final)
- Competitors: 27 from 19 nations
- Winning time: 1:57.72

Medalists
gold medal	Hubert Kós	Hungary
silver medal	Alberto Razzetti	Italy
bronze medal	Gabriel Lopes	Portugal

The Men's 200 metre individual medley competition of the 2022 European Aquatics Championships was held on 16 and 17 August 2022.

== Records ==
Prior to the competition, the existing world, European and championship records were as follows.

	Name	Nationality	Time	Location	Date
World record	Ryan Lochte	United States	1:54.00	Shanghai	24 July 2011
European record	László Cseh	Hungary	1:55.18	Rome	29 July 2009
Championship record	László Cseh	Hungary	1:56.66	Debrecen	23 May 2012

== Results ==
=== Heats ===
The heats were started on 16 August at 09:54.

Rank	Heat	Lane	Name	Nationality	Time	Notes
1	3	3	Gabriel Lopes	Portugal	1:58.94	Q
2	2	6	Carles Coll	Spain	2:00.56	Q
3	1	6	Vadym Naumenko	Ukraine	2:00.60	Q
4	1	4	Hubert Kós	Hungary	2:00.65	Q
5	1	5	Andreas Vazaios	Greece	2:01.03	Q
6	2	5	Ron Polonsky	Israel	2:01.05	Q
7	1	3	Enzo Tesic	France	2:01.28	Q
8	3	4	Jérémy Desplanches	Switzerland	2:01.47	Q
9	2	2	Eitan Ben Shitrit	Israel	2:01.55	Q
10	1	2	Daniil Giourtzidis	Greece	2:01.69	Q
11	1	1	Anže Ferš Eržen	Slovenia	2:01.98	Q
12	3	5	Alberto Razzetti	Italy	2:02.16	Q
13	3	6	Pier Andrea Matteazzi	Italy	2:02.66	Q
14	3	2	Émilien Mattenet	France	2:04.24	Q
15	3	7	William Lulek	Sweden	2:04.29	Q
16	2	7	Richard Nagy	Slovakia	2:04.51	Q
17	1	7	Emil Hassling	Sweden	2:05.71	
18	3	1	Eoin Corby	Ireland	2:05.78	
19	2	1	Luka Mladenovic	Austria	2:06.00	
20	2	8	Marius Toscan	Switzerland	2:06.03	
21	1	8	Ronens Kermans	Latvia	2:06.63	
22	3	0	Liam Custer	Ireland	2:06.66	
23	2	0	Mihai Gergely	Romania	2:06.73	
24	3	9	Zhulian Lavdaniti	Albania	2:09.05	
25	1	0	Thomas Wareing	Malta	2:09.40	
26	3	8	Jan Zubik	Poland	2:09.85	
27	2	9	Endi Kola	Albania	2:19.69	
	2	3	Bernhard Reitshammer	Austria	Did not start	
	2	4	Thomas Dean	Great Britain	Did not start	

=== Semifinals ===
The semifinals were started on 16 August at 19:36.

Rank	Heat	Lane	Name	Nationality	Time	Notes
1	2	4	Gabriel Lopes	Portugal	1:58.77	Q
2	1	5	Hubert Kós	Hungary	1:59.38	Q
3	1	3	Ron Polonsky	Israel	1:59.52	Q
3	1	7	Alberto Razzetti	Italy	1:59.52	Q
5	1	6	Jérémy Desplanches	Switzerland	1:59.53	q
6	1	4	Carles Coll	Spain	1:59.66	q
7	2	3	Andreas Vazaios	Greece	1:59.77	Q
8	2	5	Vadym Naumenko	Ukraine	2:00.48	q, NR
9	2	1	Pier Andrea Matteazzi	Italy	2:00.73	
10	2	2	Eitan Ben Shitrit	Israel	2:01.00	
11	1	2	Daniil Giourtzidis	Greece	2:01.13	
12	2	6	Enzo Tesic	France	2:01.83	
13	1	1	Émilien Mattenet	France	2:02.00	
14	2	7	Anže Ferš Eržen	Slovenia	2:03.07	
15	2	8	William Lulek	Sweden	2:03.21	
16	1	8	Richard Nagy	Slovakia	2:04.19	

=== Final ===
The final was held on 17 August at 18:37.

Rank	Lane	Name	Nationality	Time	Notes
1st place, gold medalist(s)	5	Hubert Kós	Hungary	1:57.72	
2nd place, silver medalist(s)	3	Alberto Razzetti	Italy	1:57.82	
3rd place, bronze medalist(s)	4	Gabriel Lopes	Portugal	1:58.34	
4	2	Jérémy Desplanches	Switzerland	1:58.89	
5	6	Ron Polonsky	Israel	1:59.24	
6	1	Andreas Vazaios	Greece	1:59.55	
7	7	Carles Coll	Spain	1:59.96	
8	8	Vadym Naumenko	Ukraine	2:01.61	
