= Yuxarı Velik =

- Municipality
- Location within Azerbaijan
- Coordinates: 38°35′N 48°31′E
- Country: Azerbaijan
- Rayon: Lerik

Population
  - Total: 299
- Time zone: UTC+4 (AZT)
  - Summer (DST): UTC+5 (AZT)

Yuxarı Velik (also, Yuxarı Vılık, Velik, and Yukhary Velik) is a village and municipality in the Lerik Rayon of Azerbaijan. It has a population of 299. The municipality consists of the villages of Yuxarı Velik and Hübi.
