= Swimming at the 2024 European Aquatics Championships – Men's 200 metre backstroke =

Men's 200 metre backstroke at the 2024 European Aquatics Championships
- Venue: Sports Centre Milan Gale Muškatirović
- Dates: 18 June (heats and semifinals); 19 June (final)
- Competitors: 24 from 14 nations
- Winning time: 1:55.39

Medalists
| gold medal | Oleksandr Zheltyakov | Ukraine |
| silver medal | Apostolos Siskos | Greece |
| bronze medal | Roman Mityukov | Switzerland |

The Men's 200 metre backstroke competition of the 2024 European Aquatics Championships was held on 18 and 19 June 2024.

== Records ==
Prior to the competition, the existing world, European and championship records were as follows.

| | Name | Nationality | Time | Location | Date |
|---|---|---|---|---|---|
| World record | Aaron Peirsol | United States | 1:51.92 | Rome | 31 July 2009 |
| European record | Evgeny Rylov | Russia | 1:53.23 | Kazan | 8 April 2021 |
| Championship record | Evgeny Rylov | Russia | 1:53.36 | Glasgow | 8 August 2018 |

== Results ==
=== Heats ===
The heats were started on 18 June at 10:12.
Qualification Rules: The 16 fastest from the heats qualify to the semifinals.

| Rank | Heat | Lane | Name | Nationality | Time | Notes |
|---|---|---|---|---|---|---|
| 1 | 3 | 4 | Roman Mityukov | Switzerland | 1:57.19 | Q |
| 2 | 1 | 6 | David Gerchik | Israel | 1:57.48 | Q |
| 3 | 1 | 4 | Oleksandr Zheltyakov | Ukraine | 1:58.39 | Q |
| 4 | 2 | 5 | Ksawery Masiuk | Poland | 1:58.47 | Q |
| 5 | 1 | 5 | Apostolos Siskos | Greece | 1:58.50 | Q |
| 6 | 3 | 5 | Benedek Kovács | Hungary | 1:58.79 | Q |
| 7 | 2 | 4 | Ádám Telegdy | Hungary | 1:58.80 | Q |
| 8 | 3 | 3 | John Shortt | Ireland | 1:59.15 | Q |
| 9 | 3 | 6 | Inbar Danziger | Israel | 1:59.84 | Q |
| 10 | 2 | 3 | Cornelius Jahn | Germany | 2:00.02 | Q |
| 11 | 2 | 2 | Primož Šenica Pavletič | Slovenia | 2:00.35 | Q |
| 12 | 3 | 2 | Kaloyan Levterov | Bulgaria | 2:00.48 | Q |
| 13 | 2 | 7 | Jack Skerry | Great Britain | 2:00.68 | Q |
| 14 | 2 | 6 | Radosław Kawęcki | Poland | 2:00.71 | Q |
| 15 | 3 | 7 | Flavio Bucca | Switzerland | 2:01.38 | Q |
| 16 | 1 | 3 | Christian Diener | Germany | 2:01.63 | Q |
| 17 | 1 | 7 | Anže Ferš Eržen | Slovenia | 2:01.76 | |
| 18 | 1 | 2 | Matthew Ward | Great Britain | 2:01.81 | |
| 19 | 1 | 1 | Max Halbeisen | Austria | 2:02.07 | |
| 20 | 2 | 1 | Oleksii Hrabarov | Ukraine | 2:02.33 | |
| 21 | 3 | 8 | Juraj Barcot | Croatia | 2:04.59 | |
| 22 | 1 | 8 | Jaka Pusnik | Slovenia | 2:05.79 | |
| 23 | 3 | 1 | Adam Maraana | Israel | 2:07.03 | |
| 24 | 2 | 8 | Mackey Nurkic Kacapor | Bosnia and Herzegovina | 2:07.77 | |

=== Semifinals ===
The semifinal were started on 18 June at 19:19.
Qualification Rules: The first 2 competitors of each semifinal and the remaining fastest (up to a total of 8 qualified competitors) from the semifinals advance to the final.

| Rank | Heat | Lane | Name | Nationality | Time | Notes |
|---|---|---|---|---|---|---|
| 1 | 2 | 3 | Apostolos Siskos | Greece | 1:56.54 | Q |
| 2 | 2 | 5 | Oleksandr Zheltyakov | Ukraine | 1:56.90 | Q |
| 3 | 2 | 4 | Roman Mityukov | Switzerland | 1:57.00 | Q |
| 4 | 2 | 6 | Ádám Telegdy | Hungary | 1:57.12 | Q |
| 5 | 1 | 5 | Ksawery Masiuk | Poland | 1:57.62 | Q |
| 6 | 1 | 3 | Benedek Kovács | Hungary | 1:57.99 | Q |
| 7 | 1 | 4 | David Gerchik | Israel | 1:58.38 | Q |
| 8 | 1 | 6 | John Shortt | Ireland | 1:58.89 | Q |
| 9 | 1 | 7 | Kaloyan Levterov | Bulgaria | 1:59.40 | |
| 10 | 1 | 2 | Cornelius Jahn | Germany | 1:59.54 | |
| 11 | 2 | 2 | Inbar Danziger | Israel | 1:59.72 | |
| 12 | 2 | 7 | Primož Šenica Pavletič | Slovenia | 2:00.29 | |
| 13 | 2 | 1 | Jack Skerry | Great Britain | 2:00.41 | |
| 14 | 2 | 8 | Flavio Bucca | Switzerland | 2:01.07 | |
| 15 | 1 | 1 | Radosław Kawęcki | Poland | 2:01.80 | |
| 16 | 1 | 8 | Christian Diener | Germany | 2:02.54 | |

=== Final ===
The final was held on 19 June at 18:40.

| Rank | Lane | Name | Nationality | Time | Notes |
|---|---|---|---|---|---|
| 1st place, gold medalist(s) | 5 | Oleksandr Zheltyakov | Ukraine | 1:55.39 | NR |
| 2nd place, silver medalist(s) | 4 | Apostolos Siskos | Greece | 1:55.42 | NR |
| 3rd place, bronze medalist(s) | 3 | Roman Mityukov | Switzerland | 1:55.75 | |
| 4 | 7 | Benedek Kovács | Hungary | 1:56.13 | |
| 5 | 2 | Ksawery Masiuk | Poland | 1:57.50 | |
| 6 | 1 | David Gerchik | Israel | 1:57.53 | |
| 7 | 8 | John Shortt | Ireland | 1:58.48 | |
| 8 | 6 | Ádám Telegdy | Hungary | 2:01.30 | |
