= Swimming at the 2024 European Aquatics Championships – Men's 100 metre butterfly =

Men's 100 metre butterfly at the 2024 European Aquatics Championships
- Venue: Sports Centre Milan Gale Muškatirović
- Dates: 19 June (heats and semifinals); 20 June (final)
- Competitors: 49 from 25 nations
- Winning time: 50.82

Medalists
gold medal	Kristóf Milák	Hungary
silver medal	Hubert Kós	Hungary
bronze medal	Jakub Majerski	Poland

The Men's 100 metre butterfly competition of the 2024 European Aquatics Championships was held on 19 and 20 June 2024.

== Records ==
Prior to the competition, the existing world, European and championship records were as follows.

	Name	Nationality	Time	Location	Date
World record	Caeleb Dressel	United States	49.45	Tokyo	31 July 2021
European record	Kristóf Milák	Hungary	49.68	Tokyo	31 July 2021
Championship record	Kristóf Milák	Hungary	50.18	Budapest	23 May 2021

== Results ==
=== Heats ===
The heats were started on 19 June 2024 at 09:48.
Qualification Rules: The 16 fastest from the heats qualify to the semifinals.

Rank	Heat	Lane	Name	Nationality	Time	Notes
1	6	4	Noè Ponti	Switzerland	51.09	Q
2	5	4	Kristóf Milák	Hungary	51.50	Q
3	4	4	Hubert Kós	Hungary	51.50	Q
4	5	5	Jakub Majerski	Poland	51.70	Q
5	4	5	Simon Bucher	Austria	51.72	Q
6	6	5	Gal Cohen Groumi	Israel	51.94	Q
7	6	6	Adrian Jaśkiewicz	Poland	52.01	Q
8	4	2	Björn Kammann	Germany	52.10	Q
9	4	3	Richárd Márton	Hungary	52.11	
10	5	3	Daniel Gracík	Czech Republic	52.23	Q
11	4	6	Casper Puggaard	Denmark	52.32	Q
12	3	0	Denis-Laurean Popescu	Romania	52.35	Q
13	6	1	Paweł Korzeniowski	Poland	52.39	Q
14	5	8	Anastasios Kougkoulos	Greece	52.60	Q
15	5	7	Daniel Zaitsev	Estonia	52.66	Q
16	6	7	Alex Ahtiainen	Estonia	52.67	Q
17	6	8	Đurđe Matić	Serbia	52.69	Q
18	6	3	Luca Nik Armbruster	Germany	52.71	Q
19	5	6	Joshua Gammon	Great Britain	52.73	Swim-Off > Q
19	5	2	Edward Mildred	Great Britain	52.73	Swim-Off
21	5	1	Konstantinos Stamou	Greece	52.87	
22	4	1	Lukas Edl	Austria	52.90	
23	6	2	Max McCusker	Ireland	52.94	
24	6	2	Arsenii Kovalov	Ukraine	52.95	
25	3	2	Miloš Milenković	Montenegro	52.97	NR
26	4	7	Jan Šefl	Czech Republic	53.08	
27	3	5	Frederik Møller	Denmark	53.34	
28	3	4	Linus Kahl	Sweden	53.35	
29	2	4	Luka Jovanović	Serbia	53.52	
30	6	9	Vili Sivec	Croatia	53.72	
31	5	0	Albin Lovgren	Sweden	53.78	
32	5	9	Oskar Hoff	Sweden	53.81	
33	3	6	Michał Chmielewski	Poland	54.02	
34	3	3	Alexey Glivinskiy	Israel	54.05	
35	3	7	Kregor Zirk	Estonia	54.20	
36	3	1	Polat Uzer Turnalı	Turkey	54.25	
37	3	9	Mihai Gergely	Romania	54.32	
38	3	8	Artur Barseghyan	Armenia	54.56	
39	2	6	Ognjen Pilipović	Serbia	55.17	
40	2	1	Heorhii Lukashev	Ukraine	55.32	
41	2	0	Reds Rullis	Latvia	55.88	
42	2	3	Nemanja Maksić	Serbia	55.92	
43	2	7	Ronens Kermans	Latvia	55.92	
44	2	8	Egor Covaliov	Moldova	56.02	
45	2	9	Grisi Koxhaku	Albania	56.18	NR
46	2	2	Tomàs Lomero	Andorra	56.40	
47	1	4	Jovan Jankovski	North Macedonia	56.89	
48	1	5	Paolo Priska	Albania	57.64	
49	6	1	Nikola Trajanovski	North Macedonia	58.65	
	4	0	Denis Loktev	Israel	Did not start	
	4	9	Evan Bailey	Ireland	Did not start	
	6	0	Sebastian Lunak	Czech Republic	Did not start	
	6	0	Ramil Valizade	Azerbaijan	Did not start	

=== Swim-off ===
The swim-off was held on 19 June at 10:47.
Qualification Rules: The best time advance to the semifinals.

Rank	Lane	Name	Nationality	Time	Notes
1	5	Joshua Gammon	Great Britain	51.85	Q
2	4	Edward Mildred	Great Britain	51.96	

=== Semifinals ===
The semifinals were started on 19 June at 19:04.
Qualification Rules: The first 2 competitors of each semifinal and the remaining fastest (up to a total of 8 qualified competitors) from the semifinals advance to the final.

Rank	Heat	Lane	Name	Nationality	Time	Notes
1	1	4	Hubert Kós	Hungary	51.31	Q
2	1	5	Simon Bucher	Austria	51.45	Q
3	2	4	Kristóf Milák	Hungary	51.57	Q
4	2	5	Jakub Majerski	Poland	51.62	Q
5	1	8	Joshua Gammon	Great Britain	51.65	Q
6	1	6	Daniel Gracík	Czech Republic	51.68	Q
7	2	8	Luca Nik Armbruster	Germany	51.83	Q
8	1	3	Adrian Jaśkiewicz	Poland	51.87	Q
9	2	3	Gal Cohen Groumi	Israel	52.09	
10	2	2	Casper Puggaard	Denmark	52.19	
11	1	2	Denis-Laurean Popescu	Romania	52.32	
12	2	6	Björn Kammann	Germany	52.45	
13	2	7	Anastasios Kougkoulos	Greece	52.70	
14	2	1	Alex Ahtiainen	Estonia	52.76	
15	1	7	Daniel Zaitsev	Estonia	52.84	
16	1	1	Đurđe Matić	Serbia	52.85	

=== Final ===
The final was held on 20 June at 18:30.

Rank	Lane	Name	Nationality	Time	Notes
1st place, gold medalist(s)	3	Kristóf Milák	Hungary	50.82	
2nd place, silver medalist(s)	4	Hubert Kós	Hungary	50.96	
3rd place, bronze medalist(s)	6	Jakub Majerski	Poland	50.98	
4	5	Simon Bucher	Austria	51.28	
5	7	Daniel Gracík	Czech Republic	51.40	
6	8	Adrian Jaśkiewicz	Poland	51.77	
7	1	Luca Nik Armbruster	Germany	51.88	
8	2	Joshua Gammon	Great Britain	52.32	
