= Hübi =

- Location within Azerbaijan
- Coordinates: 38°35′N 48°31′E
- Country: Azerbaijan
- Rayon: Lerik
- Municipality: Yuxarı Velik
- Time zone: UTC+4 (AZT)
  - Summer (DST): UTC+5 (AZT)

Hübi (also, Gubi) is a village in the Lerik Rayon of Azerbaijan. The village forms part of the municipality of Yuxarı Velik.

== See also ==
- Hubi - Streaming and Download is a Web application by MegaDevs
