= Gabriel Lopes =

Portuguese swimmer (born 1997)

Personal information
- Full name: Gabriel José Almeida Lopes
- Nationality: Portuguese
- Born: 15 May 1997 (age 29) Lousã, Portugal
- Height: 1.78 m (5 ft 10 in)
- Weight: 73 kg (161 lb)

Sport
- Sport: Swimming
Medal record
Men's swimming
Representing Portugal
European Championships (LC)
Bronze medal – third place	2022 Rome	200 m medley
Mediterranean Games
Bronze medal – third place	2026 Taranto	4×100 m mixed medley
World University Games
Gold medal – first place	2021 Chengdu	200 m medley

Gabriel José Almeida Lopes (born 15 May 1997) is a Portuguese swimmer. He competed in the men's 50 metre backstroke event at the 2017 World Aquatics Championships. In 2019, he competed in three events at the 2019 World Aquatics Championships held in Gwangju, South Korea. He competed in the men's 200 metre individual medley at the 2020 Summer Olympics.
