= Keaton Jones =

American swimmer (born 2004)

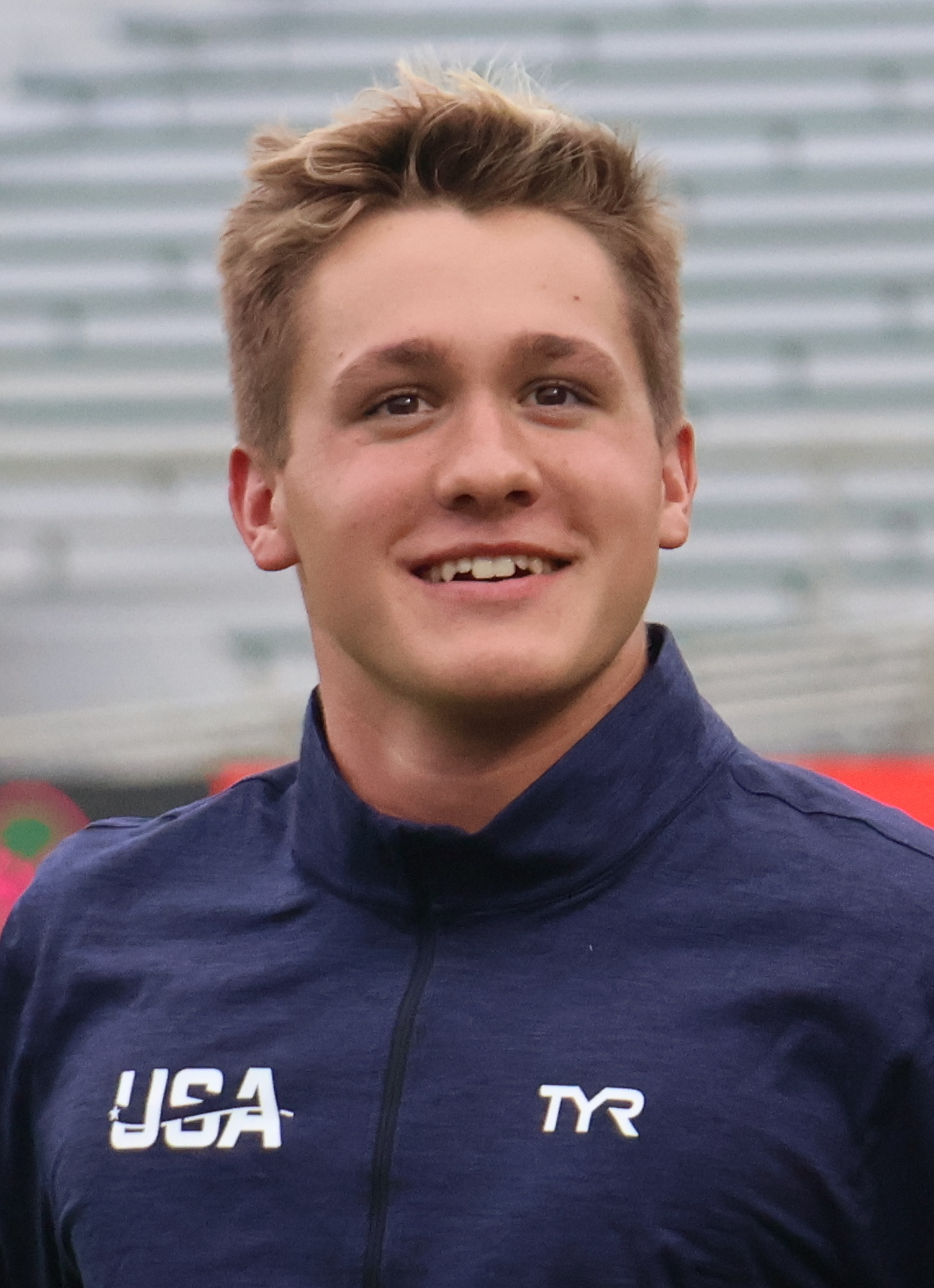
- Jones in 2024

Personal information
- Full name: Jackson Keaton Jones
- Nationality: American
- Born: October 13, 2004 (age 21) Madison, Wisconsin, U.S.
- Height: 6 ft 3 in (191 cm)
- Weight: 91 kg (201 lb)

Sport
- Country: United States
- Sport: Swimming
- Strokes: Backstroke
- Club: Swim Neptune; Cal Aquatics
- College team: University of California, Berkeley
- Coach: Alex Popa (Neptune)

Jackson Keaton Jones (born October 13, 2004) is an American swimmer who competed for the University of California Berkeley and was a 2024 Paris Olympic finalist in the 200-meter backstroke, where he placed fifth, the highest finish for an American swimmer in the event.

Keaton Jones was born on October 13, 2004, in Madison, Wisconsin to Elizabeth and Randy Jones, and attended Gilbert's Higley High School where he set all of their school records during his time with the team. Through most of his High School years, he also trained and competed with Arizona's Swim Neptune under Coach Alex Popa from around 2014–2023. Jones was twice a High School Division I Arizona Swimmer of the Year.

At the Arizona DII High School Championships, as a freshman for Higley, he had his best times in the preliminary heats, finishing the 50 freestyle with a 4:28.69 and the 100 backstroke with a 49.70. At the same state finals, he won the 500 free, placing second in the 100 backstroke. In November of his High School Senior year, he recorded a 1:35.72 in the 200 freestyle earning a title, and a new state record, and won the Division I swimmer of the meet honors. He also won the 100 backstroke, one of his signature events. During his High School years, in August 2022, he captured a medal at the Junior Pan Pacifics and made the U.S. the Junior National Team in three consecutive years. Holds all of Higley's school records.

== Olympics ==
He did not qualify for the US Olympic Team at the 2020 U.S. Trials in Omaha, Nebraska, swimming the 400 IM and the 200 and 100 backstoke events. He placed 33rd and finished best in the 400 IM, clocking a 4:29.88, and placed 43rd with a 2:04.47 in the 200 backstroke. He finished 48th in the 100 back with a 56.21.

== 2024 Olympics ==
Jones qualified to represent the United States at the 2024 Summer Olympics, placing second in the 200m backstroke at the 2024 US Olympic Swimming Team Trials. Travelling to Paris with the team, he placed fifth in the 200 meter backstroke finals with a time of 1:55.39 as the highest finish for an American swimmer.

At the Ice Swimming World Championship in Samoens, France, he was the first American to record records, setting new marks in the 50m backstroke and 100m butterfly.

Jones attended the University of California Berkeley where he was coached by Dave Durden. As an underclassman, he secured a tenth place in the 200 back at the NCAA National Championships with a time of 1:38.46, and earned a ninth place in the NCAA nationals in the 200 freestyle with a 1:34.91.
