= Denilson Cyprianos =

Zimbabwe swimmer (born 2002)

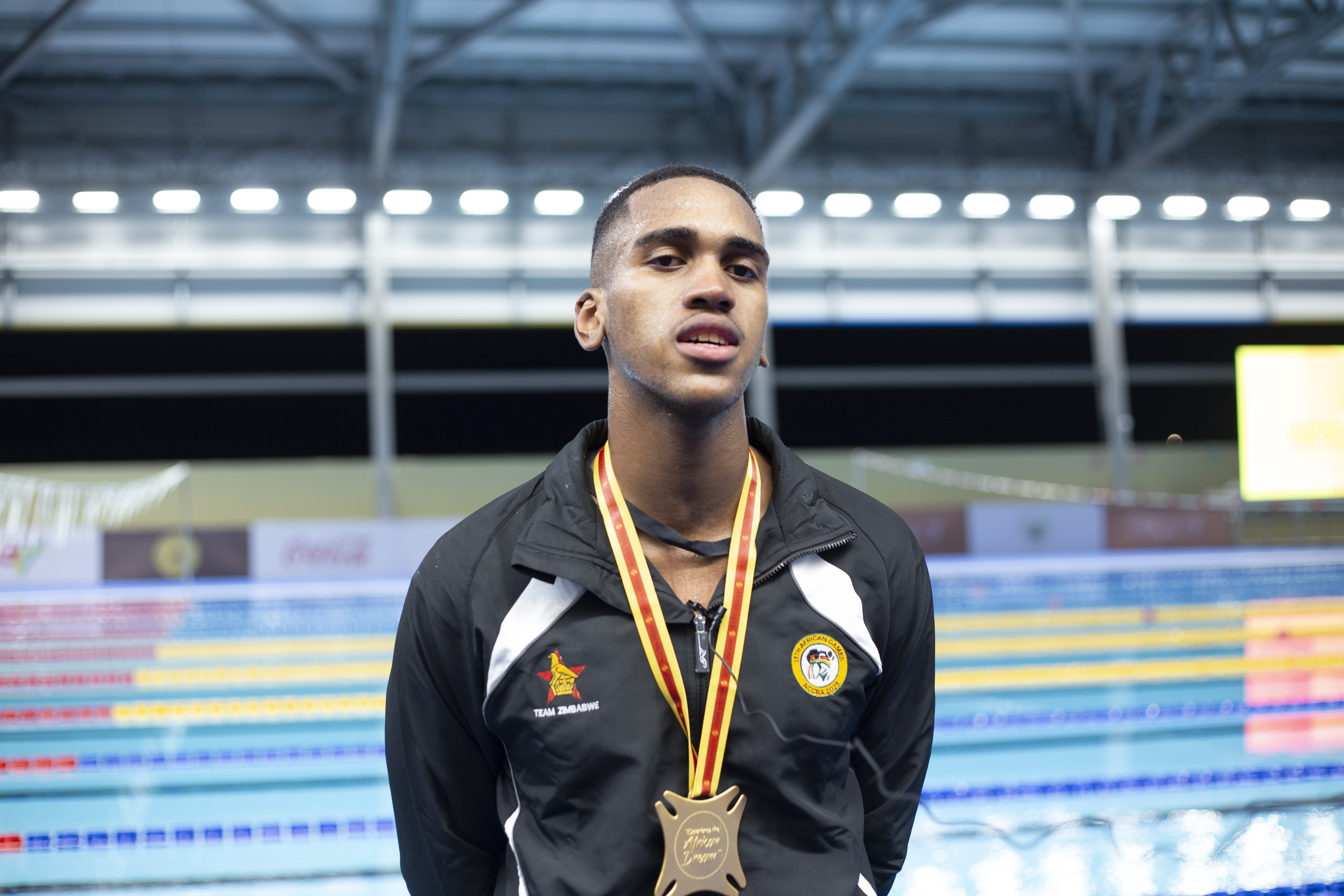
- Cyprianos at the 2023 African Games

Personal information
- Born: 7 October 2002 (age 23) Bulawayo, Zimbabwe
- Height: 6 ft 4 in (193 cm)
- Weight: 186 lb (84 kg)

Sport
- Country: Zimbabwe
- Sport: Swimming
- Strokes: Backstroke
- College team: Carson–Newman Eagles; South Dakota State Jackrabbits

Denilson Cyprianos (born 7 October 2002) is a Zimbabwean swimmer. He competed at the 2024 Summer Olympics in the men's 200m backstroke event.

== Early life and college career ==
Cyprianos was born on 7 October 2002 in Bulawayo, Zimbabwe. He has two brothers who also were competitive swimmers. He attended Christian Brothers College, Bulawayo. He was trained in swimming by his father, until his father's death in late 2020, and became one of Zimbabwe's top youth swimmers; by January 2021, Cyprianos, a backstroke swimmer, had set national records in the 50m, 100m and 200m events, also being the Zimbabwe Junior Sportsperson of the Year runner-up in 2020. He competed as a member of the Stingrays Swimming Club.

Cyprianos received an athletic scholarship to compete in college in the U.S. in 2021. He moved to the U.S. and enrolled at Carson–Newman University in Tennessee, studying finance. Within a month of joining the school and competing for the Carson–Newman Eagles swimming team, he set a team record by winning five events in one competition. As a freshman, he qualified for the NCAA Division II nationals and became an honorable mention All-American after placing 13th in the 200-yard backstroke event. Later in 2021, he qualified for the United States Open Water National Championships in the 5km event. In 2023, with the Eagles, he qualified for the NCAA B tournament and the swimming National Invitation Tournaments (NITs).

Cyprianos later transferred to South Dakota State University where he was part of school record-setting 400m and 800m freestyle relay teams and broke the school record for the 200m backstroke in 2024.

== International career ==
Cyprianos began competing for Zimbabwe internationally by 2019 and broke the national 100m backstroke record that year at a tournament in Dubai. He became one of only two junior-age Zimbabwean swimmers to set a national record. He was selected for the 2019 FINA World Junior Swimming Championships where he participated in five events with a highest placement of 40th. In February 2020, he served as captain of the Zimbabwe team competing at the CANA Zone IV Swimming Championships in Botswana. There, he won seven gold medals and one silver.

Cyprianos competed at the 2021 African Swimming Championships where he had a highest placement of fourth, in the 50m backstroke. Two years later, he participated at the 2023 World Aquatics Championships and broke the national record in the 100m backstroke with a time of 57.29 seconds. He finished 46th at the tournament in the 100m backstroke and also competed in the 200m, where he was 26th. He later competed at the 2024 World Aquatics Championships, where he placed 34th in the 100m and 26th in the 200m. Cyprianos participated at the 2023 African Games, held in March 2024, and won the gold medal in the 200m event, ending a nine-year gold medal drought for Zimbabwe at the games. He also won silver in the 200m at the African Games.

Cyprianos was selected to represent Zimbabwe at the 2024 Summer Olympics in Paris, France. Competing in the 200m backstroke, he set the new national record with a time of 2:01.91, although he did not advance from his heat. He finished 28th in his event.
