= Apostolos Siskos =

Greek swimmer (born 2005)

Personal information
- Native name: Απόστολος Σίσκος
- Nationality: Greek
- Born: 24 June 2005 (age 21) Serres, Greece
- Height: 1.75 m (5 ft 9 in)

Sport
- Sport: Swimming
- Strokes: Backstroke, Butterfly
Medal record
Men's swimming
Representing Greece
European Championships (LC)
Silver medal – second place	2024 Belgrade	200 m backstroke
Silver medal – second place	2026 Paris	200 m backstroke
Bronze medal – third place	2026 Paris	200 m butterfly
European U23 Championships
Gold medal – first place	2025 Samorin	200 m backstroke
Bronze medal – third place	2025 Samorin	200 m butterfly
European Junior Championships
Bronze medal – third place	2023 Belgrade	200 m backstroke
Mediterranean Games
Gold medal – first place	2026 Taranto	200 m backstroke

Apostolos Siskos (Greek: Απόστολος Σίσκος; born 24 June 2005) is a Greek swimmer. He represented Greece at the 2024 Summer Olympics.

== Career ==
On 7 February 2023, Siskos verbally committed to swim collegiately at Harvard for the 2024–25 season. He represented Greece at the 2024 Summer Olympics and finished in 14th place in the 200 metre backstroke with a time of 1:57.77.

On 6 July 2026, he was selected to represent Greece at the 2026 European Aquatics Championships. During the European Championships he won a silver medal in the 200 metre backstroke with a national record time of 1:53.81. He also won a bronze medal in the 200 metre butterfly with a national record time of 1:54.13. He then competed at the 2026 Mediterranean Games where he served as a flag bearer for Greece during the opening ceremony. He won a gold medal in the 200 metre backstroke with a time of 1:55.95.
