= Roman Mityukov =

Swiss swimmer (born 2000)

Personal information
- Nationality: Swiss
- Born: 30 July 2000 (age 26) Geneva, Switzerland
- Height: 1.80 m (5 ft 11 in)

Sport
- Sport: Swimming
- Strokes: Backstroke
Medal record
Representing Switzerland
Olympic Games
Bronze medal – third place	2024 Paris	200 m backstroke
World Championships (LC)
Silver medal – second place	2024 Doha	200 m backstroke
Bronze medal – third place	2023 Fukuoka	200 m backstroke
European Championships (LC)
Bronze medal – third place	2020 Budapest	200 m backstroke
Bronze medal – third place	2024 Belgrade	200 m backstroke

Roman Mityukov (born 30 July 2000) is a Swiss swimmer specialized in backstroke. He won a silver medal in the 200 m backstroke at the 2024 World Aquatics Championships, and a bronze medal in the 200 m backstroke at the 2024 Summer Olympics in Paris, setting a new Swiss national record.

== Early life and education ==
Roman Mityukov was born in Geneva, Switzerland, to Russian parents. Despite having trained in Geneva since a young age, Mityukov faced challenges competing internationally in his teenage years due to his lack of Swiss citizenship, which he obtained in 2018.

He is a law student at the University of Geneva and planned to complete the Master's in September 2024.

== Career and achievements ==
Mityukov competed in the men's 200 metre backstroke at the 2019 World Aquatics Championships. In the same year, he swam the 100 m backstroke in 54.72 seconds, a Swiss national record.

Mityukov participated at the 2020 Summer Olympics in Tokyo in various races: he finished 16th in the 100-meter freestyle semifinal and together with Antonio Djakovic, Nils Liess and Noè Ponti he finished the 4 × 200 m relay in sixth place.

In 2023, he won a bronze medal at the World Championships in the 200 m backstroke, setting a new Swiss national record with a time of 1:55.34. A year later, he won the silver medal in the same competition.

Mityukov claimed a bronze medal in the 200-meter backstroke at the 2024 Summer Olympics in Paris, improving his previous best with a time of 1:54.85. He was the fourth Swiss swimmer to earn an Olympic medal. He was one of the flag-bearers for Switzerland at the closing ceremony alongside triathlete Julie Derron.
