= Oliver Morgan (swimmer) =

British swimmer

Personal information
- Nationality: British (English)
- Born: 11 June 2003 (age 23) Bishop's Castle, Shropshire, England

Sport
- Sport: Swimming
- Event: Backstroke
- University team: University of Birmingham
- Club: Ludlow SC
Medal record
Men's swimming
Representing Great Britain
European Championships (SC)
| Silver medal – second place | 2023 Otepeni | 4 x 50 m medley |
| Bronze medal – third place | 2025 Lublin | 100 m backstroke |
Representing England
Commonwealth Games
| Silver medal – second place | 2026 Glasgow | 50 m backstroke |
| Silver medal – second place | 2026 Glasgow | 100 m backstroke |
| Silver medal – second place | 2026 Glasgow | 200 m backstroke |
| Silver medal – second place | 2026 Glasgow | 4×100 m freestyle |
| Silver medal – second place | 2026 Glasgow | 4×100 m medley |

Oliver Morgan (born 11 June 2003) is a swimmer from England, who is a multiple British Champion. He represented Great Britain at the 2024 Summer Olympics.

== Career ==
Morgan came to prominence in 2023 at the age of 19 when he won the gold medal in all three backstroke events at the 2023 British Swimming Championships; in the 50 metres backstroke, 100 metres backstroke and 200 metres backstroke.

The success led to his selection for the 2023 World Championships. After winning both the 100 metres backstroke and the 200 metres backstroke (no 50 metre event was held as it was not at that time an Olympic event) at the 2024 Aquatics GB Swimming Championships, Morgan sealed his place at the 2024 Summer Olympics. His win over the 100 metres was a new national record in a time of 52.70 sec.

At the 2024 Olympic Games in Paris, he participated in the men's 100 metre backstroke competition, where he reached the Olympic final.

In 2025, Morgan successfully defended all three of his backstroke titles at the 2025 Aquatics GB Swimming Championships, which sealed a qualification place for the 2025 World Aquatics Championships in Singapore. Morgan had won all eight of the national backstroke championship events on offer held in the three years from 2023 to 2025. Subsequently at the World Championships, he reached the final of the 100 metres backstroke.
