= Oleksandr Zheltyakov =

Ukrainian swimmer (born 2005)

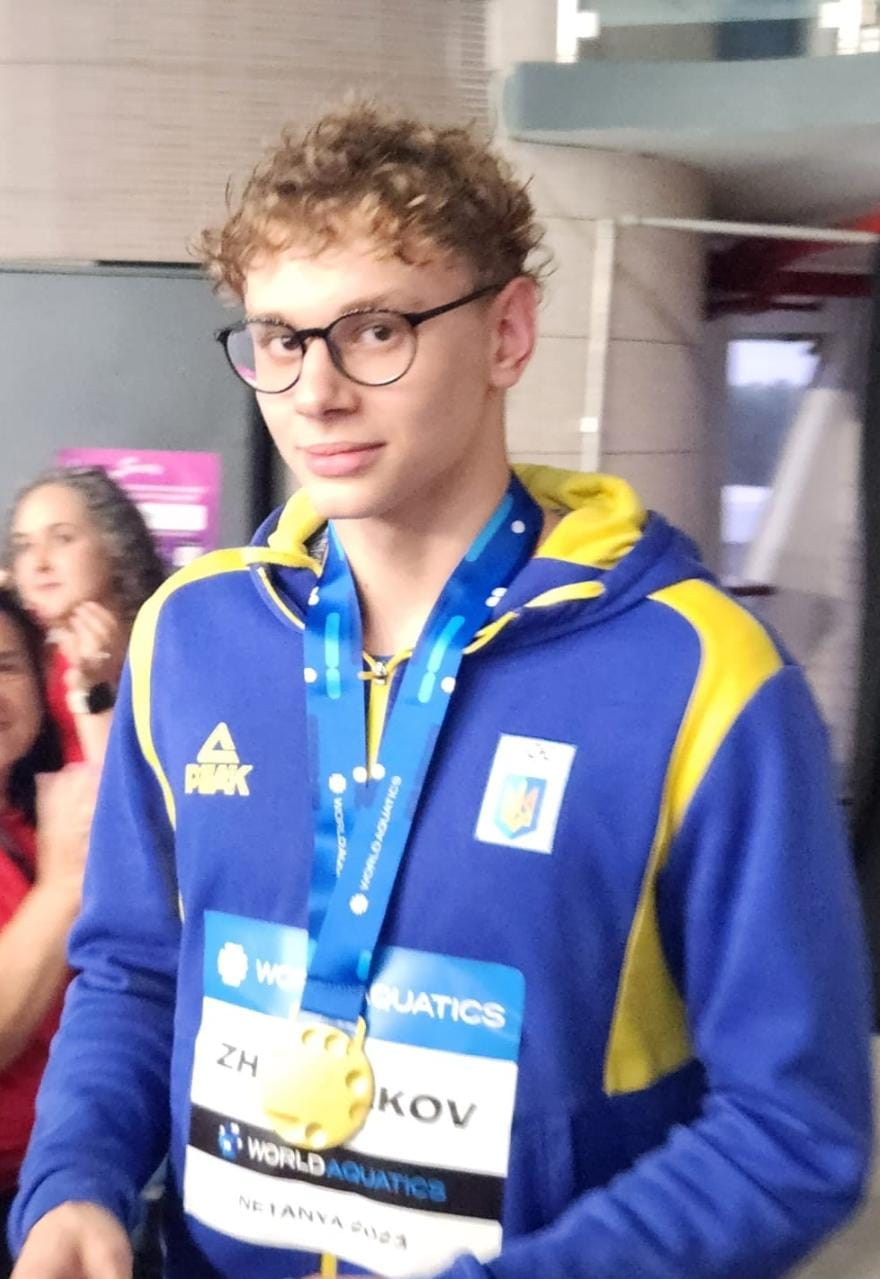

Personal information
- Full name: Oleksandr Viktorovych Zheltyakov
- Nationality: Ukraine
- Born: 15 November 2005 (age 20) Dnipropetrovsk, Ukraine

Sport
- Sport: Swimming
- Strokes: Backstroke
Medal record
Men's swimming
Representing Ukraine
Event	1st	2nd	3rd
European Championships (LC)	1	0	1
European U23 Championships	0	2	0
World Junior Championships	2	1	0
European Junior Championships	2	5	2
Total	5	8	3
European Championships (LC)
Gold medal – first place	2024 Belgrade	200 m backstroke
Bronze medal – third place	2024 Belgrade	4 x 100 m medley relay
European U23 Championships
Silver medal – second place	2025 Samorin	100 m backstroke
Silver medal – second place	2025 Samorin	200 m backstroke
World Junior Championships
Gold medal – first place	2023 Netanya	100 m backstroke
Gold medal – first place	2023 Netanya	200 m backstroke
Silver medal – second place	2023 Netanya	50 m backstroke
European Junior Championships
Gold medal – first place	2023 Belgrade	100 m backstroke
Gold medal – first place	2023 Belgrade	200 m backstroke
Silver medal – second place	2021 Rome	50 m backstroke
Silver medal – second place	2022 Otopeni	100 m backstroke
Silver medal – second place	2022 Otopeni	200 m backstroke
Silver medal – second place	2022 Otopeni	4 x 100 m medley relay
Silver medal – second place	2023 Belgrade	50 m backstroke
Bronze medal – third place	2021 Rome	4 x 100 m medley relay
Bronze medal – third place	2021 Rome	4 x 100 m mixed medley relay

Oleksandr Viktorovych Zheltyakov (Ukrainian: Олександр Вікторович Желтяков, born 15 November 2005) is a Ukrainian swimmer. He is twice gold medalist at the 2023 World Junior Championships and multiple European Junior Championships medalist.

== Career ==
At the 2021 European Junior Swimming Championships in Rome Oleksandr won a silver medal in 100 m backstroke and two bronze medals in the 4 × 100 m medley relay mixed and the 4 × 100 m medley relay events.

He competed at the 2022 World Aquatics Championships in 100 and 200 m backstroke events without reaching any medals.

At the 2022 European Junior Swimming Championships in Otopeni he won 3 silver medals in 100 and 200 m backstroke, and 4 × 100 m medley relay events.

In April 2023 he received an Olympic quota for 2024 Summer Olympics in Paris for the 200 m backstroke.

At the 2023 European Junior Swimming Championships in Belgrade he won 2 gold medals in the 100 and 200 m backstroke events and a silver medal in the 50 m backstroke event.

At the 2023 World Aquatics Junior Swimming Championships in Netanya he won 2 gold medals in 100 and 200 m backstroke and a silver medal in 50 m backstroke events, becoming the best male athlete at this championship according to the World Aquatics. At the 2023 World Junior Championships Oleksandr received his second Olympic quota for the 2024 Summer Olympics in Paris for 100 m backstroke.

He competed at the 2023 European Short Course Swimming Championships in 50, 100 and 200 m backstroke and 4 x 50 m metres relay events without reaching any medals.

In December 2023, he became the Best Sportsmen of Year with Ukrainian high jumper Yaroslava Mahuchikh according to the National Olympic Committee of Ukraine.

At the 2024 European Aquatics Championships, held in Belgrade, Oleksandr became a gold medalist in the 200 m backstroke event and received a bronze medal in the 4 × 100 m medley relay event.

== Awards and honours ==
- FINA: Male Swimmer of the Championships: 2023 World Junior Championships
