= Hubert Kós =

Hungarian swimmer (born 2003)

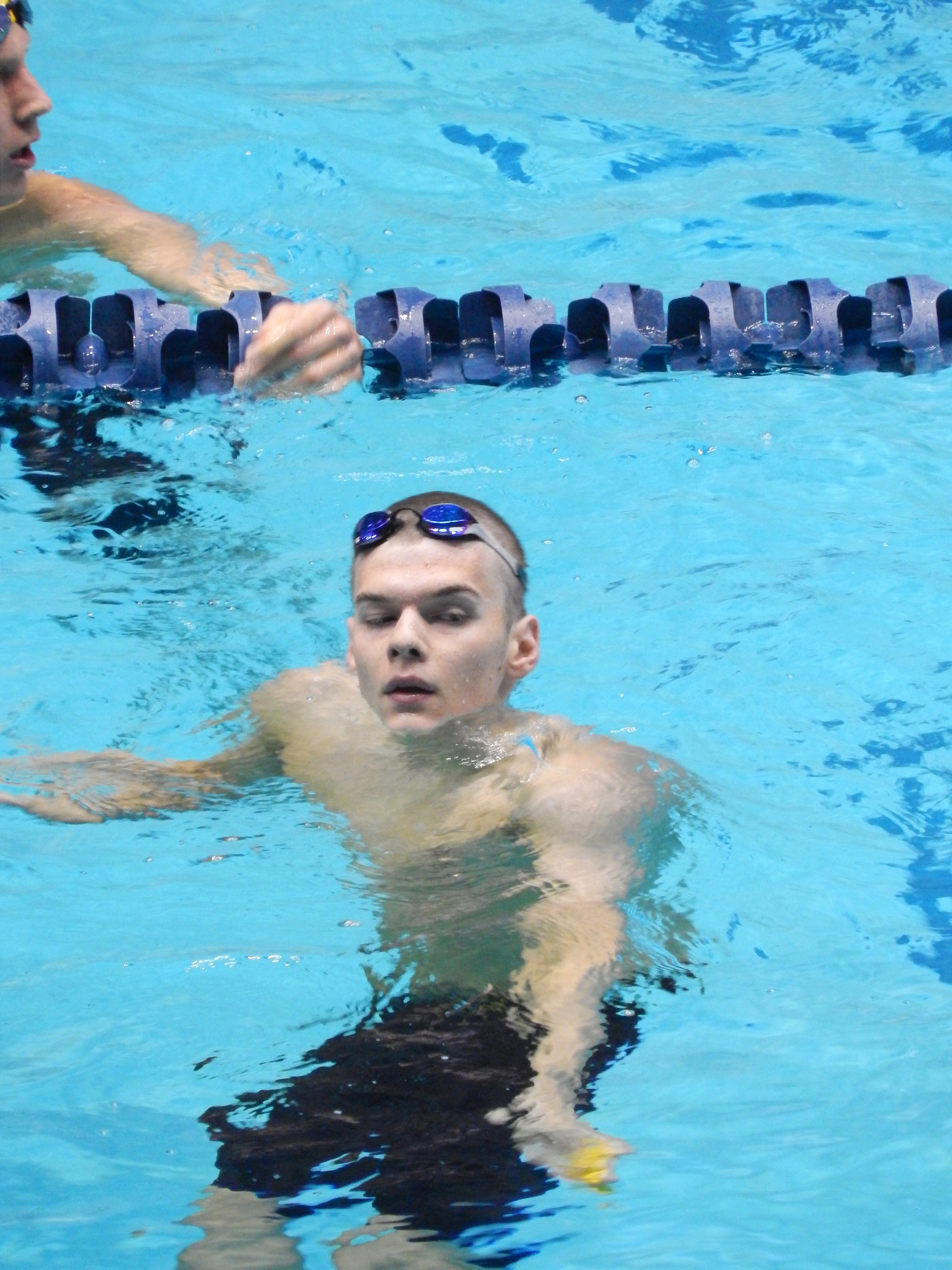
- Kós in 2023

Personal information
- Full name: Hubert Bela Kós
- Nationality: Hungarian
- Born: 28 March 2003 (age 23) Budapest, Hungary
- Height: 1.90 m (6 ft 3 in)

Sport
- Sport: Swimming
- Strokes: Backstroke, butterfly, medley
- Club: BVSC-Zugló
- College team: (United States) University of Texas at Austin
Medal record
Men's swimming
Representing Hungary
Olympic Games Olympic Games
Gold medal – first place	2024 Paris	200 m backstroke
World Championships (LC)
Gold medal – first place	2023 Fukuoka	200 m backstroke
Gold medal – first place	2025 Singapore	200 m backstroke
Bronze medal – third place	2025 Singapore	200 m medley
World Championships (SC)
Gold medal – first place	2024 Budapest	200 m backstroke
Silver medal – second place	2024 Budapest	100 m backstroke
European Championships (LC)
Gold medal – first place	2022 Rome	200 m medley
Gold medal – first place	2024 Belgrade	200 m medley
Gold medal – first place	2024 Belgrade	4 × 100 m mixed freestyle
Gold medal – first place	2026 Paris	200 m backstroke
Gold medal – first place	2026 Paris	4 × 100 m freestyle
Gold medal – first place	2026 Paris	200 m medley
Silver medal – second place	2024 Belgrade	100 m butterfly
Silver medal – second place	2024 Belgrade	4 × 200 m freestyle
Bronze medal – third place	2024 Belgrade	4 × 100 m mixed medley
European Championships (SC)
Bronze medal – third place	2021 Kazan	400 m medley
European Youth Olympic Festival
Silver medal – second place	2019 Baku	100 m backstroke
Silver medal – second place	2019 Baku	100 m butterfly
Silver medal – second place	2019 Baku	200 m medley
Silver medal – second place	2019 Baku	400 m medley

Hubert Bela Kós (born 28 March 2003) is a Hungarian swimmer and a member of the University of Texas swim team. He is a world junior record holder in the 200 metre individual medley and an Olympic champion in the 200 metre backstroke. At the 2021 European Short Course Championships, he won the bronze medal in the 400 metre individual medley. At the 2022 European Aquatics Championships, he won the gold medal in the 200 metre individual medley. In 2023, he won the bronze medal in the 200 yard backstroke at the year's men's NCAA Division I Swimming and Diving Championships. In 2024, he won the gold medal in the 200 metre backstroke at the 2024 Summer Olympics in Paris. He's the world's #1 performer in the 200 metre backstroke in the 2020s.

== Early life ==
Kós has family links to Cork in Ireland, and has visited there several times since he was a boy. He is a great-grandnephew of John A Mulcahy who developed Waterville Golf Links and he enjoys travelling there to play golf. His paternal grandmother is Irish, while his paternal grandfather is Hungarian who emigrated to Ireland with his family at the age of 6 in 1946. Kós' father spent his childhood in Cork.

He has two younger siblings: a brother, Olivér, and a sister, Alison who are also swimmers. He studied at the American International School of Budapest.

== Career ==
=== 2021–2022 ===
In the semifinals of the men's 200 metre individual medley event of the 2020 European Aquatics Championships, Kós set a new World Junior Record with a time of 1:56.99. He competed in the men's 200 metre individual medley at the 2020 Summer Olympics. At the 2021 European Short Course Championships, conducted at the Palace of Water Sports in Kazan, Russia, he won the bronze medal in the 400 metre individual medley with a time of 4:03.16. Two days earlier at the Championships, he placed fourth in the final of the 200 metre individual medley with a European junior record time of 1:52.87.

At the 2022 European Aquatics Championships, held in Rome, Italy, 19-year-old Kós won the gold medal in the 200 metre individual medley with a time of 1:57.72. Earlier in the competition, he placed fourth in the final of the 100 metre butterfly with a personal best time of 51.33 seconds. In November, at the 2022 Hungarian National Short Course Championships in Kaposvár, he set his first Hungarian record in the final of the 100 metre individual medley to win the national title with a time of 52.82 seconds.

=== 2023 ===
On 3 March, at the 2023 Pac-12 Conference Championships at King County Aquatic Center in Federal Way, United States, Kós won the bronze medal in the 400 yard individual medley with a time of 3:37.68. The day before, he placed tenth overall, second in the b-final, in the 200 yard individual medley with a time of 1:42.37. Day four of four overall, 4 March, he placed fourth in the 200 yard backstroke with a time of 1:39.21, which was 2.27 seconds behind gold medalist Destin Lasco of the California Golden Bears.

As a freshman (first year) at the 2023 NCAA Division I Championships later in the month, Kós started by taking third-place in the b-final of the 200 yard individual medley on day two with a personal best time of 1:41.61 to contribute to a b-final podium sweep by Arizona State Sun Devils swimmers (9th, 10th, 11th overall). The next day, he placed fourth in the evening final of the 400 yard individual medley, finishing 8.18 seconds behind gold medalist and Sun Devils teammate Léon Marchand with a time of 3:37.00, which followed a personal best time of 3:36.86 in the morning preliminaries that qualified him for the final ranking fourth. On the fourth and final day, he won the first NCAA Championships medal of his collegiate career in the 200 yard backstroke, winning the bronze medal with a personal best time of 1:37.96.

At the 2023 TYR Pro Swim Series in April in Westmont, United States, Kós placed fourth in the 100 metre backstroke on day three with a personal best time of 53.83 seconds. This followed a fourth-place finish in the 400 metre individual medley on day two with a time of 4:14.08. On the fourth and final day, he achieved a personal best time of 1:56.28 in the preliminaries of the 200 metre backstroke, qualifying for the final ranking first, before going on to win the final in a personal best and 2023 World Aquatics Championships qualifying time of 1:55.95, which was 1.02 seconds faster than the next-fastest competitor.

== Swimming World Cup circuits ==
The following medals Kós has won at Swimming World Cup circuits.

Edition	Gold medals	Silver medals	Bronze medals	Total
2021	1	2	3	6
2022	0	1	2	3
Total	1	3	5	9

== Personal best times ==
=== Long course metres (50 m pool) ===
Event	Time	Meet	Location	Date	Age	Notes	Ref
50 m backstroke	24.50	2025 World Aquatics Championships	Singapore	2 August 2025	22	NR	
100 m backstroke	52.20	2025 World Aquatics Championships	Singapore	29 July 2025	22	NR	
200 m backstroke	1:52.30	2026 European Aquatics Championships	Paris	11 August 2026	23	ER	
100 m butterfly	50.55	2025 Hungarian National Championships	Budapest, Hungary	12 April 2025	22		
200 m individual medley	1:54.24	2026 European Aquatics Championships	Paris	16 August 2026	23	CR	

Legend: ER – European record; NR – Hungarian record;
Records not set in finals: h – heat; sf – semifinal; r – relay 1st leg; rh – relay heat 1st leg; b – B final; † – en route to final mark; so – swim-off; tt – time trial

=== Short course metres (25 m pool) ===
Event	Time	Meet	Location	Date	Age	Notes	Ref
50 m backstroke	22.64	2024 World Aquatics Swimming Championships (25 m)	Budapest, Hungary	13 December 2024	21	NR	
100 m backstroke	48.16	World Aquatics Swimming World Cup 2025	Toronto, Canada	25 October 2025	22	WR	
200 m backstroke	1:45.12	World Aquatics Swimming World Cup 2025	Toronto, Canada	23 October 2025	22	WR	
100 m individual medley	50.56	World Aquatics Swimming World Cup 2025	Toronto, Canada	23 October 2025	22	NR	

Legend: NR – Hungarian record; WR – World record;
Records not set in finals: h – heat; sf – semifinal; r – relay 1st leg; rh – relay heat 1st leg; b – B final; † – en route to final mark; so – swim-off; tt – time trial

=== Short course yards (25 yd pool) ===
Event	Time	Meet	Location	Date	Age	Notes	Ref
100 yd backstroke	42.61	2026 NCAA Division I Championships	Atlanta, United States	27 March 2026	22	US	
200 yd backstroke	1:34.13	2026 NCAA Division I Championships	Atlanta, United States	28 March 2026	22	US	
100 yd butterfly	42.54	2026 NCAA Division I Championships	Atlanta, United States	26 March 2026	22		
200 yd individual medley	1:37.91	2025 NCAA Division I Championships	Federal Way, United States	27 March 2025	21		

Legend: b – b-final; h – preliminary heat; US - U.S. Open record

== Records ==
=== World records ===
==== Short course metres (25 m pool) ====
100 metre Backstroke 200 metre Backstroke

=== National records ===
==== Short course metres (25 m pool) ====
No.	Event	Time	Meet	Location	Date	Age	Ref
1	100 m individual medley	52.82	2022 Hungarian National Short Course Championships	Kaposvár	17 November 2022	19	

=== World junior records ===
==== Long course metres (50 m pool) ====
No.	Event	Time		Meet	Location	Date	Age	Ref
1	200 m individual medley	1:56.99	sf	2020 European Aquatics Championships	Budapest	19 May 2021	18	

Legend: sf – semifinal
