= Ksawery Masiuk =

Polish swimmer (born 2004)

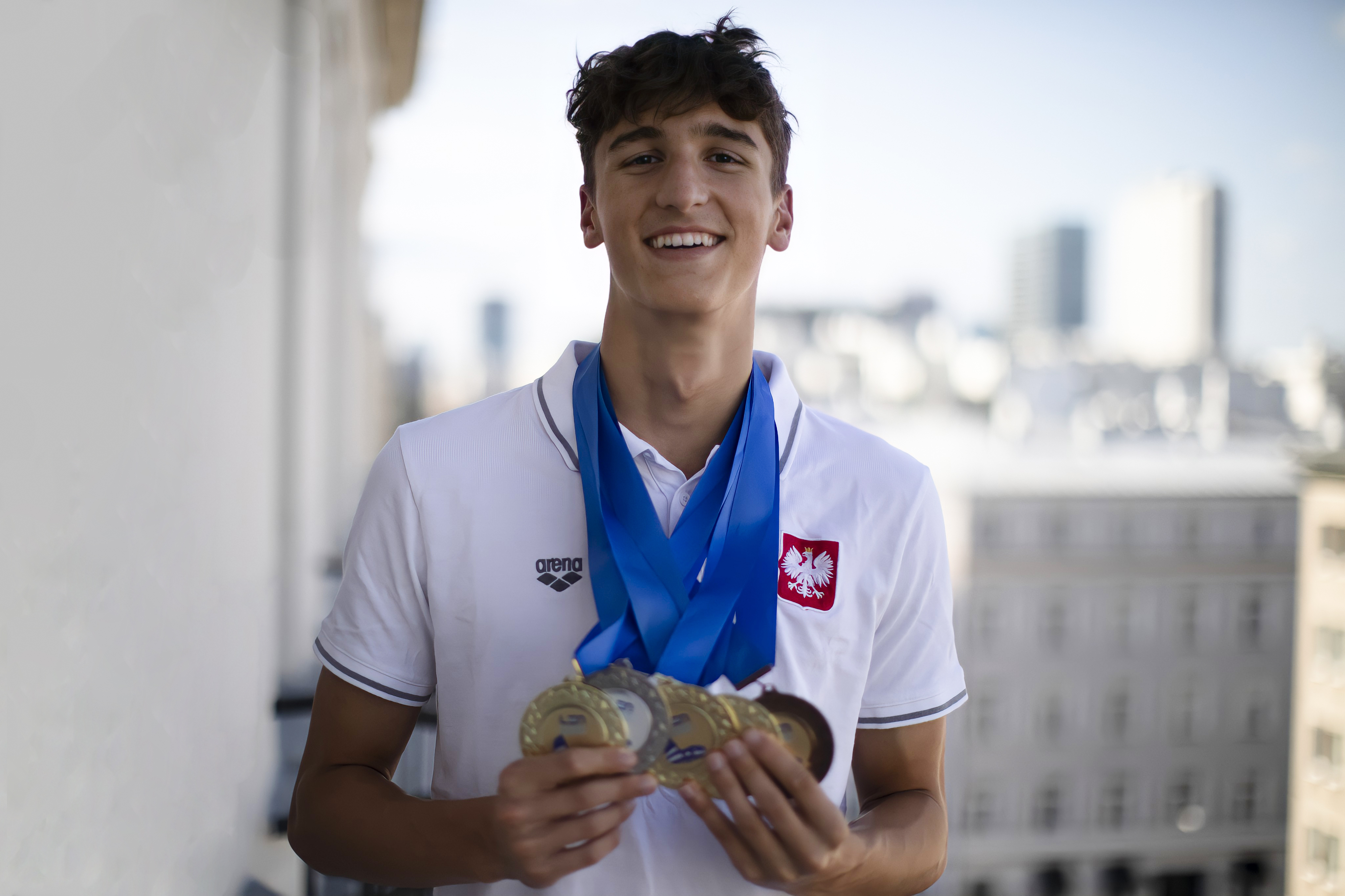
- Masiuk in 2021

Personal information
- Nationality: Polish
- Born: 17 December 2004 (age 21) Tarnów, Poland
- Height: 1.94 m (6 ft 4 in)

Sport
- Sport: Swimming
- Strokes: Backstroke
Medal record
Men's swimming
Representing Poland
World Championships (LC)
Bronze medal – third place	2022 Budapest	50 m backstroke
Bronze medal – third place	2024 Doha	50 m backstroke
World Championships (SC)
Bronze medal – third place	2024 Budapest	4×100 m freestyle
European Championships (LC)
Silver medal – second place	2024 Belgrade	50 m backstroke
Silver medal – second place	2024 Belgrade	4×100 m medley
Bronze medal – third place	2024 Belgrade	100 m backstroke
European Championships (SC)
Silver medal – second place	2025 Lublin	4×50 m freestyle
World Junior Championships
Gold medal – first place	2022 Lima	50 m backstroke
Gold medal – first place	2022 Lima	100 m backstroke
Gold medal – first place	2022 Lima	4×100 m medley
Gold medal – first place	2022 Lima	4×100 m mixed medley
Bronze medal – third place	2022 Lima	200 m backstroke
Bronze medal – third place	2022 Lima	4×200 m freestyle
European U-23 Championships
Gold medal – first place	2025 Samorin	50 m backstroke
European Junior Championships
Gold medal – first place	2021 Rome	100 m backstroke
Gold medal – first place	2021 Rome	200 m backstroke
Gold medal – first place	2021 Rome	4×100 m medley
Gold medal – first place	2022 Otopeni	50 m backstroke
Gold medal – first place	2022 Otopeni	100 m backstroke
Gold medal – first place	2022 Otopeni	200 m backstroke
Silver medal – second place	2021 Rome	50 m backstroke
Bronze medal – third place	2021 Rome	4×100 m freestyle
Bronze medal – third place	2022 Otopeni	4×200 m freestyle
Bronze medal – third place	2022 Otopeni	4×100 m medley
Bronze medal – third place	2022 Otopeni	4×100 m mixed freestyle

Ksawery Masiuk (Polish: [ksaˈvɛrɨ ˈmaɕuk]; born 17 December 2004) is a Polish swimmer who specializes in the backstroke. He won bronze medals at the 2022 World Aquatics Championships and two silver and one bronze medals at the 2024 European Aquatics Championships.

== Career ==
=== Career beginnings ===
He started his professional career as a swimmer in 2012 in the UKS Start Wola Rzendzińska club trained by Henryk Iwaniec. In 2013, he began representing BOSiR Brzesko under coach Marcin Kacer. In 2017, he moved to Warsaw where he attended the Janusz Kusociński Sports High School No. 59 and entered the G-8 Bielany Warszawa club under his current coach Paweł Wołkow.

In 2021, he participated at the Polish Aquatics Championships in Lublin and won gold in the 50 m backstroke with the 25.14 seconds result setting a new national record for 17-year olds, which allowed him to qualify for the World Aquatics Championships in Budapest.

In the same year, he won gold medal at the European Junior Swimming Championships in Rome in the 100 meters backstroke by achieving 53.91 seconds. In the 50 meters event, he finished second with the 25.28 seconds result.

He won gold medals at the 2022 FINA World Junior Swimming Championships in Lima, Peru, in the 50 and 100 meter backstroke events. He also won gold medals in the 4×100 meters medley and 4×100 meters mixed medley alongside Karolina Piechowicz, Krzysztof Chmielewski and Paulina Cierpiałowska.

=== Senior career ===
He won a bronze medal at the 19th FINA World Championships in Budapest in 2022, was briefly upgraded to silver after the disqualification of American swimmer Justin Ress and returned to bronze after Ress was reinstated.

In 2023, he came fourth in the 50 meters backstroke event at the World Aquatics Championships in Fukuoka, Japan, falling 0.07 seconds short of bronze medal.

In 2024, he won two silver and one bronze medals at the European Aquatics Championships in Belgrade in the 50 m backstroke, 4 × 100 m medley and 100 meters backstroke respectively. At the 2024 Summer Olympics, he reached the semifinal of the men's 100 backstroke event but failed to qualify to the final. At the 2024 World Aquatics Swimming Championships in Budapest, he won a bronze medal in the 4 × 100 metre freestyle relay.

== See also ==
- List of Polish swimmers
- Sport in Poland
- Otylia Jędrzejczak
