= 2026 European Junior Swimming Championships =

Water sport competitions

- Host city: Munich, Germany
- Dates: 7-12 July 2026
- Main venue: Olympia Schwimmhalle

The 2026 European Junior Swimming Championships is held from 7 to 12 July 2026 in Munich, Germany. The Championships were for girls and boys aged 14–18. Championships held in Olympia Schwimmhalle.

== Medal table ==
* Host nation (Germany)

Rank	Nation	Gold	Silver	Bronze	Total
1	Neutral Individual Athletes	15	10	11	36
2	Italy	5	5	4	14
3	Great Britain	5	2	7	14
4	Hungary	3	5	2	10
5	France	3	1	5	9
6	Spain	2	5	3	10
7	Poland	2	1	2	5
8	Czech Republic	2	1	0	3
8	Turkey	2	1	0	3
10	Germany*	1	2	2	5
11	Greece	1	2	0	3
12	Romania	1	1	1	3
13	Belgium	1	0	1	2
14	Belarus	0	2	0	2
14	Switzerland	0	2	0	2
16	Lithuania	0	1	1	2
17	Austria	0	0	1	1
17	Netherlands	0	0	1	1
17	Ukraine	0	0	1	1
Totals (19 entries)		43	41	42	126

Source: Medal Standings

== Results ==
=== Boys ===
Games	Gold		Silver		Bronze	
50 m freestyle	Jan Foltýn; Czech Republic	22.10	Luca Hoek; Spain	22.14	Christian Tassan-Caser; Italy	22.25
100 m freestyle	Luca Hoek; Spain	48.18	Egor Proshin; Authorised Neutral Athletes	48.49	Tajus Juška; Lithuania	48.67
200 m freestyle	Ahmet Mete Boylu; Turkey	1:45.68	Tajus Juška; Lithuania	1:45.83	Bogdan Toropkin; Authorised Neutral Athletes	1:46.15
400 m freestyle	Grigorii Vekovishchev; Authorised Neutral Athletes	3:44.58	Olivér Pápai; Hungary	3:47.88	Christian Giefing; Austria	3:47.92
800 m freestyle	Grigorii Vekovishchev; Authorised Neutral Athletes	7:52.31	Mikołaj Litoborski; Poland	7:53.36	Maksim Gusev; Authorised Neutral Athletes	7:54.37
1500 m freestyle	Mikołaj Litoborski; Poland	15:08.02	Juan Vallmitjana; Spain	15:08.11	Adrien Espriet; France	15:12.48
50 m backstroke	Grigorii Chernogaev; Authorised Neutral Athletes	24.84	Artsiom Yarmak; Belarus	24.92	Matvei Asheko; Authorised Neutral Athletes	25.08
100 m backstroke	Mikhail Shcherbakov; Authorised Neutral Athletes	53.99	Nathan Muratory; France	54.00	Chrissander Cerda; France	54.52
200 m backstroke	Nathan Muratory; France	1:55.88	Daniel Ransom; Great Britain	1:59.00	Mateusz Bieńkowski; Poland	1:59.19
50 m breaststroke	Max Morgan; Great Britain	27.26	Jan Foltýn; Czech Republic	27.29	Louis Hoffmann; Germany	27.34
100 m breaststroke	Evangelos Ntoumas; Greece	59.91	Louis Hoffmann; Germany	1:00.29	Max Morgan; Great Britain	1:00.41
200 m breaststroke	Doruk Yoğurtçuoğlu; Turkey	2:09.43	Evangelos Efraim Ntoumas; Greece	2:11.37	Gabriele Garzia; Italy	2:13.07
50 m butterfly	Jan Foltýn; Czech Republic	23.45	Dávid Antal; Hungary	23.59	Dean Fearn; Great Britain	23.63
100 m butterfly	Egor Baranov; Authorised Neutral Athletes	52.20	Francesco Ceolin; Italy	52.23	Joaquín Pavón; Spain	52.55
200 m butterfly	Dávid Antal; Hungary	1:57.40	Georgios Kalandros; Greece	1:58.77	Matéo Grégoire-Charmasson; France	1:58.79
200 m individual medley	Mikhail Shcherbakov; Neutral Individual Athletes	1:58.12	Emre Onuş; Turkey	2:00.18	Simon Laviolette; Belgium	2:00.37
400 m individual medley	Simon Laviolette; Belgium	4:18.69	Denis Piataikin; Authorised Neutral Athletes	4:21.35	Anton Denysenko; Ukraine	4:23.28
4×100 m freestyle relay	Authorised Neutral Athletes; Bogdan Toropkin; Egor Proshin; Matvei Miliaev; Mikhail Shcherbakov	3:12.75 WJ	Italy; Christian Tassan-Caser; Andrea Lucarelli; Damiano Cappellazzo; Francesco Ceolin	3:15.46	Great Britain; Aran Bissett; Jensen Norris; Harry Milne; Dean Fearn	3:16.06
4×200 m freestyle relay	Authorised Neutral Athletes; Bogdan Toropkin; Mikhail Shcherbakov; Savelii Vishniakov; Grigorii Vekovishchev	7:09.16 EJ CR	Italy; Francesco Volpe; Damiano Cappellazzo; Biagio Aldrighetti; Francesco Ceolin	7:16.14	Hungary; Dávid Antal; Koppány Zéta Kakuk; Botond Takács; Olivér Pápai	7:17.30
4×100 m medley relay	Italy; Gabriele Di Scola; Gabriele Garzia; Francesco Ceolin; Christian Tassan-Caser	3:35.59	Authorised Neutral Athletes; Mikhail Shcherbakov; Aleksei Grabko; Egor Baranovlas; Egor Proshin	3:36.01	United Kingdom; Daniel Ransom; Max Morgan; Dean Fearn; Aran Bissett	3:36.39

=== Girls ===
Games	Gold		Silver		Bronze	
50 m freestyle	Theodora Taylor; Great Britain	24.82	Irene Ciércoles; Spain	24.91	Kira Manokhina; Authorised Neutral Athletes	25.02
100 m freestyle	Alessandra Mao; Italy	54.28	Kira Manokhina; Authorised Neutral Athletes	54.37	Emma Wood; Great Britain	54.61
200 m freestyle	Linda Roth; Germany	1:57.79	Sofia Diakova; Authorised Neutral Athletes	1:58.32	Bianca Nannucci; Italy	1:58.82
400 m freestyle	Kseniia Misharina; Authorised Neutral Athletes	4:05.54 CR	Sofia Diakova; Authorised Neutral Athletes	4:06.86	Linda Roth; Germany	4:08.20
800 m freestyle	Kseniia Misharina; Authorised Neutral Athletes	8:25.75	Vivien Jackl; Hungary	8:26.97	Sofia Diakova; Authorised Neutral Athletes	8:32.83
1500 m freestyle	Kseniia Misharina; Authorised Neutral Athletes	16:05.46	Vivien Jackl; Hungary	16:11.59	Anna Arshavskaia; Authorised Neutral Athletes	16:25.25
50 m backstroke	Daria-Mariuca Silisteanu; Romania	27.94	Irene Ciércoles; Spain	27.97	Jeanne Lechevalier; France	28.07
100 m backstroke	Irene Ciércoles; Spain	1:00.06	Daria Silișteanu; Romania	1:00.11	Jeanne Lechevalier; France	1:00.35
200 m backstroke	Jeanne Lechevalier; France Fanni Viktória Kokas; Hungary	2:10.76	Not awarded		Aissia Prisecariu; Romania	2:11.58
50 m breaststroke	Sofia Anufrieva; Authorised Neutral Athletes	30.88	Valeryia Shylko; Belarus	31.38	Gabrielle Beavers; Great Britain	31.54
100 m breaststroke	Sofia Anufrieva; Authorised Neutral Athletes	1:08.10	Kay-Lyn Löhr; Switzerland	1:08.88	Lucía Gregoria Martínez; Spain	1:09.11
200 m breaststroke	Imogen Myles; Great Britain	2:26.02	Kay-Lyn Löhr; Switzerland	2:26.10	Viktoriia Kariuk; Authorised Neutral Athletes	2:26.17
50 m butterfly	Andréanne Bourseul; France	26.19	Carlota Rodríguez; Spain	26.40	Jinth Engelse; Netherlands	26.49
100 m butterfly	Caterina Santambrogio; Italy	58.63	Serafima Fokina; Authorised Neutral Athletes	58.67	Barbara Leśniewska; Poland	58.78
200 m butterfly	Vivien Jackl; Hungary	2:09.42	Serafima Fokina; Authorised Neutral Athletes	2:10.06	Boróka Kertész; Hungary	2:10.87
200 m individual medley	Barbara Leśniewska; Poland	2:12.45	Viktoriia Tarannikova; Authorised Neutral Athletes	2:14.10	Anna Rzaeva; Authorised Neutral Athletes	2:14.44
400 m individual medley	Amalie Smith; Great Britain	4:35.32 CR	Vivien Jackl; Hungary	4:37.47	Viktoriia Blinova; Authorised Neutral Athletes	4:45.78
4×100 m freestyle relay	Great Britain; Emma Wood; Theodora Taylor; Hannah Capron; Amalie Smith	3:37.35 EJ CR	Italy; Alessandra Leoni; Caterina Santambrogio; Penelope Lopez-Casula; Alessandra Mao	3:39.36	Authorised Neutral Athletes; Kira Manokhina; Kseniia Sorokina; Polina Kholopova; Kseniia Misharina	3:39.62
4×200 m freestyle relay	Italy; Alessandra Mao; Lucrezia Domina; Alice Guarnieri; Bianca Nannucci	7:56.26	Authorised Neutral Athletes; Kseniia Misharina; Sofia Diakova; Arina Brykanova; Kseniia Sorokina	7:57.34	Great Britain; Theodora Taylor; Hannah Capron; Evi Mackie; Amalie Smith	7:58.59
4×100 m medley relay	Authorised Neutral Athletes; Varvara Filippova; Sofia Anufrieva; Serafima Fokina; Kira Manokhina	4:01.83 =CR	Italy; Benedetta Boscaro; Lucrezia Mancini; Caterina Santambrogio; Alessandra Mao	4:02.75	Spain; Sara Costa de Vicente; Lucia Gregoria Martinez Moreno; Carlota Rodriguez Alcaide; Irene Ciercoles Galve	4:05.91

=== Mixed ===
Games	Gold		Silver		Bronze	
4×100 m freestyle relay	Authorised Neutral Athletes; Egor Proshin; Mikhail Shcherbakov; Kseniia Sorokina; Kira Manokhina	3:23.96 WJ	Great Britain; Aran Bissett; Harry Milne; Theodora Taylor; Amalie Smith	3:26.50	Italy; Francesco Ceolin; Christian Tassan-Caser; Caterina Santambrogio; Alessandra Mao	3:26.97
4×100 m medley relay	Italy; Gabriele Di Scola; Matteo Ongaro; Caterina Santambrogio; Alessandra Mao	3:48.14	Germany; Mitja Bauer; Louis Hoffmann; Yara Fay Riefstahl; Linda Roth	3:48.25	Authorised Neutral Athletes; Mikhail Shcherbakov; Aleksei Grabko; Serafima Fokina; Kira Manokhina	3:48.39
