= List of world junior records in swimming =

The World Junior Records in Swimming are ratified by World Aquatics. They are the fastest times recorded by a swimmer aged 14 to 18 years, as of 31 December of the year of competition.

The long course (50 m pool) records were established in March 2014 and used the competition records from the World Junior Championships as standard times. Short course (25 m pool) records were established on 1 January 2015, and were shortly followed by the release of "Junior World Bests," which served as standard times for each event. Initially, the age groups were 15 to 18 years for boys and 14 to 17 years for girls. In 2023, they were changed to 14 to 18 years for all athletes.

Records are recognized for long course and short course in the following events:

- freestyle: 50, 100, 200, 400, 800 and 1500;
- backstroke: 50, 100 and 200;
- breaststroke: 50, 100 and 200;
- butterfly: 50, 100 and 200;
- Individual medley: 100 (short course only), 200 and 400;
- relays: 4×50 freestyle (short course only), 4×100 freestyle, 4×200 freestyle, 4×50 medley (short course only) and 4×100 medley;
- Mixed relays: 4×100 freestyle (long course only), 4×50 medley (short course only) and 4×100 medley (long course only).

All records were swum in finals unless noted otherwise.

== Long Course (50 m) ==
=== Boys ===
Event	Time		Name	Nationality	Date	Meet	Location	Ref
50m freestyle	21.75	h, =	Michael Andrew	United States	25 August 2017	World Junior Championships	Indianapolis, United States	
50m freestyle	21.75	=	Michael Andrew	United States	26 August 2017	World Junior Championships	Indianapolis, United States	
50m freestyle	21.75	sf, =	Nikita Sheremet	Ukraine	21 August 2025	World Junior Championships	Otopeni, Romania	
100m freestyle	46.86		David Popovici	Romania	13 August 2022	European Championships	Rome, Italy	
200m freestyle	1:42.97		David Popovici	Romania	15 August 2022	European Championships	Rome, Italy	
400m freestyle	3:42.82		Zhang Zhanshuo	China	10 November 2025	National Games	Shenzhen, China	
400m freestyle	3:40.59	(Note: Performance predates the establishment of long course records (March 2014), but was not achieved at the World Junior Championships. Fastest junior of all time, unratified.)	Ian Thorpe	Australia	16 September 2000	Olympic Games	Sydney, Australia	
800m freestyle	7:43.37		Lorenzo Galossi	Italy	13 August 2022	European Championships	Rome, Italy	
1500m freestyle	14:41.22		Kuzey Tunçelli	Turkey	4 August 2024	Olympic Games	Paris, France	
50m backstroke	24.00		Kliment Kolesnikov	Russia	4 August 2018	European Championships	Glasgow, Great Britain	
100m backstroke	52.08	r	Miron Lifintsev	Russia	28 July 2024	Russian Cup	Yekaterinburg, Russia	
200m backstroke	1:54.87	h	Nathan Muratory	France	11 August 2026	European Championships	Paris, France	
200m backstroke	1:54.77		Ryosuke Irie	Japan	7 June 2008	Japan Open	Tokyo, Japan	
50m breaststroke	26.95	h	Jan Malte Gräfe	Germany	23 August 2025	World Junior Championships	Otopeni, Romania	
50m breaststroke	26.75	h, #	Yusei Imaizumi	Japan	18 October 2026	Niigata OPEN Kohei Kawamoto Cup / 31st Niigata Prefecture Sprint Championships	Nagaoka, Japan	
100m breaststroke	58.54		Shin Ohashi	Japan	13 August 2026	Pan Pacific Championships	Irvine, United States	
200m breaststroke	2:04.83	WR	Shin Ohashi	Japan	24 September 2026	Asian Games	Tokyo, Japan	
50m butterfly	22.96		Diogo Ribeiro	Portugal	3 September 2022	World Junior Championships	Lima, Peru	
100m butterfly	50.62		Kristóf Milák	Hungary	29 July 2017	World Championships	Budapest, Hungary	
200m butterfly	1:53.79		Kristóf Milák	Hungary	30 June 2017	European Junior Championships	Netanya, Israel	
200m butterfly	1:52.71	not ratified	Kristóf Milák	Hungary	28 March 2018	Hungarian Championships	Debrecen, Hungary	
200m individual medley	1:56.16		Mikhail Shcherbakov	Neutral Athletes B	16 August 2026	European Championships	Paris, France	
200m individual medley	1:55.94		Michael Phelps	United States	9 August 2003	USA Championships	College Park, United States	
200m individual medley	1:55.36	#	Yumeki Kojima	Japan	20 September 2026	Asian Games	Tokyo, Japan	
400m individual medley	4:08.69	h	Yumeki Kojima	Japan	13 August 2026	Pan Pacific Championships	Irvine, United States	
400m individual medley	4:07.02	#	Yumeki Kojima	Japan	22 September 2026	Asian Games	Tokyo, Japan	
4 × 100m freestyle relay	3:12.75		Bogdan Toropkin (49.21); Egor Proshin (47.58); Matvei Miliaev (48.36); Mikhail Shcherbakov (47.60)	Neutral Individual Athletes	7 July 2026	European Junior Championships	Munich, Germany	
4 × 200m freestyle relay	7:08.37		Jake Magahey (1:48.11); Luca Urlando (1:47.13); Jake Mitchell (1:47.03); Carson Foster (1:46.10)	United States	23 August 2019	World Junior Championships	Budapest, Hungary	
4 × 100m medley relay	3:33.19		Nikolay Zuev (53.84); Vladislav Gerasimenko (59.53); Andrey Minakov (50.93); Aleksandr Shchegolev (48.89)	Russia	25 August 2019	World Junior Championships	Budapest, Hungary	

Legend: # – Record awaiting ratification by World Aquatics; WR – World record; ER – European record; e – equalled existing record;
Records not set in finals: h – heat; sf – semifinal; r – relay 1st leg; rh – relay heat 1st leg; b – B final; † – en route to final mark; so – swim-off; tt – time trial

=== Girls ===
Event	Time		Name	Nationality	Date	Meet	Location	Ref
50m freestyle	24.17		Claire Curzan	United States	14 May 2021	TAC Titans Spring Invitational Meet	Cary, United States	
50m freestyle	23.99		Cate Campbell	Australia	2 August 2009	World Championships	Rome, Italy	
100m freestyle	52.70		Penny Oleksiak	Canada	11 August 2016	Olympic Games	Rio de Janeiro, Brazil	
100m freestyle	52.49	(Note: Past performances by 18-year-old girls were not retroactively ratified following the change to the age group in 2023. Fastest junior of all time, unratified.)	Mollie O'Callaghan	Australia	18 May 2022	Australian Championships	Adelaide, Australia	
200m freestyle	1:53.65		Summer McIntosh	Canada	26 July 2023	World Championships	Fukuoka, Japan	
400m freestyle	3:56.08		Summer McIntosh	Canada	28 March 2023	Canadian Trials	Toronto, Canada	
800m freestyle	8:11.00		Katie Ledecky	United States	22 June 2014	Woodlands Senior Invitational Meet	Shenandoah, United States	
800m freestyle	8:07.39		Katie Ledecky	United States	8 August 2015	World Championships	Kazan, Russia	
1500m freestyle	15:28.36		Katie Ledecky	United States	24 August 2014	Pan Pacific Championships	Gold Coast, Australia	
1500m freestyle	15:25.48		Katie Ledecky	United States	4 August 2015	World Championships	Kazan, Russia	
50m backstroke	27.49		Minna Atherton	Australia	7 February 2016	Brisbane Sprint Championships	Brisbane, Australia	
50m backstroke	27.22		Fu Yuanhui	China	1 April 2013	Chinese Championships	Zhengzhou, China	
100m backstroke	57.57	r	Regan Smith	United States	28 July 2019	World Championships	Gwangju, South Korea	
200m backstroke	2:03.35	sf, AM	Regan Smith	United States	26 July 2019	World Championships	Gwangju, South Korea	
50m breaststroke	29.30	sf	Benedetta Pilato	Italy	22 May 2021	European Championships	Budapest, Hungary	
100m breaststroke	1:04.35	sf, ER	Rūta Meilutytė	Lithuania	29 July 2013	World Championships	Barcelona, Spain	
200m breaststroke	2:19.64		Viktoriya Zeynep Gunes	Turkey	30 August 2015	World Junior Championships	Singapore, Singapore	
50m butterfly	25.46		Rikako Ikee	Japan	26 August 2017	World Junior Championships	Indianapolis, United States	
50m butterfly	25.11		Rikako Ikee	Japan	10 June 2018	Mare Nostrum	Canet-en-Roussillon, France	
100m butterfly	56.33		Mizuki Hirai	Japan	22 June 2024	Kanagawa Prefectural High School General Athletic Meet	Kanagawa, Japan	
100m butterfly	56.20	not ratified	Claire Curzan	United States	10 April 2021	TAC Titans Premier Invitational	Cary, United States	
100m butterfly	56.06		Sarah Sjöström	Sweden	27 July 2009	World Championships	Rome, Italy	
200m butterfly	2:03.03		Summer McIntosh	Canada	1 August 2024	Olympic Games	Paris, France	
200m individual medley	2:06.56		Summer McIntosh	Canada	3 August 2024	Olympic Games	Paris, France	
200m individual medley	2:06.10	#, AS	Yu Zidi	China	21 September 2026	Asian Games	Tokyo, Japan	
400m individual medley	4:24.38		Summer McIntosh	Canada	16 May 2024	Canadian Trials	Toronto, Canada	
4 × 100m freestyle relay	3:35.53		Rylee Erisman (53.41); Liberty Clark (53.85); Julie Mishler (54.65); Lily King (53.62)	United States	23 August 2025	World Junior Championships	Otopeni, Romania	
4 × 200m freestyle relay	7:51.47		Kayla Sanchez (1:59.01); Penny Oleksiak (1:56.86); Rebecca Smith (1:58.66); Taylor Ruck (1:56.94)	Canada	23 August 2017	World Junior Championships	Indianapolis, United States	
4 × 100m medley relay	3:58.38		Jade Hannah (1:00.68); Faith Knelson (1:07.86); Penny Oleksiak (56.91); Taylor Ruck (52.93)	Canada	28 August 2017	World Junior Championships	Indianapolis, United States	

Legend: # – Record awaiting ratification by World Aquatics; WR – World record; AM – Americas record; AS – Asian record; ER – European record; e – equalled existing record;
Records not set in finals: h – heat; sf – semifinal; r – relay 1st leg; rh – relay heat 1st leg; b – B final; † – en route to final mark; so – swim-off; tt – time trial

=== Mixed ===
Event	Time	Name	Nationality	Date	Meet	Location	Ref
4 × 100 m freestyle relay	3:23.96	Egor Proshin (47.94); Mikhail Shcherbakov (48.37); Kseniia Sorokina (53.75); Kira Manokhina (53.90)	Neutral Individual Athletes	8 July 2026	European Junior Championships	Munich, Germany	
4 × 100 m medley relay	3:44.84	William Grant (53.89); Josh Matheny (59.31); Torri Huske (58.04); Gretchen Walsh (53.60)	United States	21 August 2019	World Junior Championships	Budapest, Hungary	

Legend: # – Record awaiting ratification by World Aquatics; WR – World record; e – equalled existing record;
Records not set in finals: h – heat; so – swim-off

== Short Course (25 m) ==
=== Boys ===
Event	Time		Name	Nationality	Date	Meet	Location	Ref
50m freestyle	20.81		Nikita Sheremet	Ukraine	7 December 2025	European Championships	Lublin, Poland	
50m freestyle	20.70	rh, (Note: Performance predates the establishment of short course records (1 January 2015), but was not considered a Junior World Best. Fastest junior of all time, unratified.)	Evgeny Sedov	Russia	6 December 2014	World Championships	Doha, Qatar	
100m freestyle	45.64		David Popovici	Romania	15 December 2022	World Championships	Melbourne, Australia	
200m freestyle	1:40.65	AF	Matthew Sates	South Africa	3 October 2021	World Cup	Berlin, Germany	
200m freestyle	1:40.08		Danila Izotov	Russia	13 December 2009	European Championships	Istanbul, Turkey	
400m freestyle	3:36.57		Grigorii Vekovishchev	Russia	9 November 2025	Russian Championships	Kazan, Russia	
400m freestyle	3:35.64		Ian Thorpe	Australia	2 April 1999	World Championships	Hong Kong, Hong Kong	
800m freestyle	7:30.47		Johannes Liebmann	Germany	6 December 2025	European Championships	Lublin, Poland	
1500m freestyle	14:20.64		Kuzey Tunçelli	Turkey	10 December 2024	World Championships	Budapest, Hungary	
1500m freestyle	14:19.55		Grant Hackett	Australia	27 September 1998	Australian Championships	Perth, Australia	
50m backstroke	22.47		Miron Lifintsev	Russia	13 December 2024	World Championships	Budapest, Hungary	
100m backstroke	48.76		Miron Lifintsev	Russia	11 December 2024	World Championships	Budapest, Hungary	
200m backstroke	1:47.89		John Shortt	Ireland	3 December 2025	European Championships	Lublin, Poland	
50m breaststroke	25.66	sf	Chris Smith	South Africa	14 December 2024	World Championships	Budapest, Hungary	
100m breaststroke	56.35		Yusei Imaizumi	Japan	4 September 2026	Niigata Prefecture High School Autumn Athletic Meet	Niigata, Japan	
100m breaststroke	55.82	#	Yusei Imaizumi	Japan	10 October 2026	Japanese Championships	Saga, Japan	
200m breaststroke	2:00.12		Shin Ohashi	Japan	12 October 2026	Japanese Championships	Saga, Japan	
50m butterfly	22.28		Ilya Kharun	Canada	14 December 2022	World Championships	Melbourne, Australia	
100m butterfly	49.03		Ilya Kharun	Canada	18 December 2022	World Championships	Melbourne, Australia	
200m butterfly	1:49.61		Chen Juner	China	28 October 2022	Chinese Championships	Beijing, China	
100m individual medley	50.63		Kliment Kolesnikov	Russia	14 December 2018	World Championships	Hangzhou, China	
200m individual medley	1:51.45		Matthew Sates	South Africa	2 October 2021	World Cup	Berlin, Germany	
400m individual medley	3:56.47	ER	Ilya Borodin	Russia	20 December 2021	World Championships	Kazan, Russia	
4×50m freestyle relay	1:27.46							
4 × 100m freestyle relay	3:12.56							
4 × 200m freestyle relay	6:59.66							
4×50m medley relay	1:38.29							
4 × 100m medley relay	3:28.05							

Legend: # – Record awaiting ratification by World Aquatics; WR – World record; AF – African record; ER – European record; OC – Oceanian record; e – equalled existing record;
Records not set in finals: h – heat; sf – semifinal; r – relay 1st leg; rh – relay heat 1st leg; b – B final; † – en route to final mark; so – swim-off; tt – time trial

=== Girls ===
Event	Time		Name	Nationality	Date	Meet	Location	Ref
50m freestyle	23.66		Eva Okaro	Great Britain	15 December 2024	World Championships	Budapest, Hungary	
100m freestyle	51.45		Kayla Sanchez	Canada	14 December 2018	Swim England Winter Championships	Sheffield, Great Britain	
200m freestyle	1:51.62		Claire Weinstein	United States	15 December 2024	World Championships	Budapest, Hungary	
200m freestyle	1:51.38		Ariarne Titmus	Australia	11 December 2018	World Championships	Hangzhou, China	
400m freestyle	3:50.25	WR	Summer McIntosh	Canada	10 December 2024	World Championships	Budapest, Hungary	
800m freestyle	7:59.44	AS	Wang Jianjiahe	China	6 October 2018	World Cup	Budapest, Hungary	
1500m freestyle	15:42.05		Katie Grimes	United States	4 November 2022	World Cup	Indianapolis, United States	
1500m freestyle	15:28.33		Lani Pallister	Australia	29 November 2020	Australian Championships	Brisbane, Australia	
50m backstroke	25.95		Mizuki Hirai	Japan	18 October 2025	Japanese Championships	Tokyo, Japan	
50m backstroke	25.49	r,	Mollie O'Callaghan	Australia	17 December 2022	World Championships	Melbourne, Australia	
100m backstroke	55.75		Bella Sims	United States	4 November 2022	World Cup	Indianapolis, United States	
100m backstroke	55.62		Mollie O'Callaghan	Australia	14 December 2022	World Championships	Melbourne, Australia	
200m backstroke	1:59.96		Summer McIntosh	Canada	15 December 2024	World Championships	Budapest, Hungary	
50m breaststroke	28.81		Benedetta Pilato	Italy	21 November 2020	International Swimming League	Budapest, Hungary	
50m breaststroke	28.81	sf,	Rūta Meilutytė	Lithuania	3 December 2014	World Championships	Doha, Qatar	
100m breaststroke	1:02.36	=WR	Rūta Meilutytė	Lithuania	12 October 2013	World Cup	Moscow, Russia	
200m breaststroke	2:14.70		Evgeniia Chikunova	Russia	25 November 2022	Solidarity Games	Kazan, Russia	
50m butterfly	24.55		Claire Curzan	United States	19 December 2021	World Championships	Abu Dhabi, United Arab Emirates	
100m butterfly	55.30		Mizuki Hirai	Japan	20 December 2025	Kanagawa Yume Kokutai Memorial Championships	Sagamihara, Japan	
100m butterfly	55.10	AS, not ratified	Mizuki Hirai	Japan	22 February 2025	Sagamihara City Championships	Sagamihara, Japan	
200m butterfly	1:59.32	WR	Summer McIntosh	Canada	12 December 2024	World Championships	Budapest, Hungary	
100m individual medley	57.59		Anastasiya Shkurdai	Belarus	22 November 2020	International Swimming League	Budapest, Hungary	
200m individual medley	2:04.48		Yu Yiting	China	20 December 2021	World Championships	Abu Dhabi, United Arab Emirates	
400m individual medley	4:15.48	WR	Summer McIntosh	Canada	14 December 2024	World Championships	Budapest, Hungary	
4×50m freestyle relay	1:40.59							
4 × 100m freestyle relay	3:32.63							
4 × 200m freestyle relay	7:43.73							
4×50m medley relay	1:44.43	not ratified	Wan Letian (26.42); Tang Qianting (28.96); Yu Yiting (25.28); Cheng Yujie (23.78)	China	17 December 2021	World Championships	Abu Dhabi, United Arab Emirates	
4 × 100m medley relay	3:49.16							

Legend: # – Record awaiting ratification by World Aquatics; WR – World record; AM – Americas record; AS – Asian record; OC – Oceanian record; e – equalled existing record;
Records not set in finals: h – heat; sf – semifinal; r – relay 1st leg; rh – relay heat 1st leg; b – B final; † – en route to final mark; so – swim-off; tt – time trial

=== Mixed ===
Event	Time		Name	Nationality	Date	Meet	Location	Ref
4×50 m freestyle relay	1:31.50	not ratified	Daniel Diehl (22.07); Quintin McCarty (21.35); Kristina Paegle (23.78); Carly Novelline (24.30)	United States	2 October 2021	World Cup	Berlin, Germany	
4×50 m freestyle relay	1:31.23	not ratified	Jacob Mills (22.22); Nicholas Finch (21.61); Skye Carter (23.98); Eva Okaro (23.42)	Great Britain	14 December 2023	Ontario Junior International	Toronto, Canada	
4×50 m medley relay	1:41.21		Quintin McCarty (24.07); Zhier Fan (26.75); Charlotte Hook (26.27); Kristina Paegle (24.12)	United States	9 October 2021	World Cup	Budapest, Hungary	

Legend: # – Record awaiting ratification by World Aquatics; WR – World record; e – equalled existing record;
Records not set in finals: h – heat; sf – semifinal; r – relay 1st leg; rh – relay heat 1st leg; b – B final; † – en route to final mark; so – swim-off; tt – time trial
