= Swimming at the 2026 Commonwealth Games – Men's 100 metre breaststroke =

Men's 100 metre breaststroke at the 2026 Commonwealth Games
- Venue: Tollcross International Swimming Centre
- Dates: 24 July (heats, semifinals); 25 July (final)
- Competitors: 40 from 32 nations
- Winning time: 59.17

Medalists
gold medal	Sam Williamson	Australia
silver medal	Filip Nowacki	Jersey
bronze medal	Adam Ramsey-Peaty	England

The men's 100 metre breaststroke event at the 2026 Commonwealth Games was held on 24 and 25 July at the Tollcross International Swimming Centre. Filip Nowacki's silver medal was the first ever swimming medal for Jersey at the Commonwealth Games and their first in any sport in thirty six years.

== Schedule ==
The schedule is as follows:

All times are British Summer Time (UTC+1)

Date	Time	Round
Friday 24 July 2026	11:54	Heats
Friday 24 July 2026	20:31	Semifinals
Saturday 25 July 2026	21:04	Final

== Results ==
=== Heats ===
The heats were held at 11:54 on 24 July 2026.

Heat results
Rank	Heat	Lane	Swimmer	Nation	Time	Notes
1	6	4	Adam Ramsay-Peaty	England	59.46	Q
2	5	4	Sam Williamson	Australia	59.56	Q
3	4	4	Filip Nowacki	Jersey	59.93	Q
4	4	6	Michael Houlie	South Africa	1:00.14	Q
5	6	6	Zac Stubblety-Cook	Australia	1:00.21	Q
6	6	5	Oliver Dawson	Canada	1:00.33	Q
7	4	5	Greg Butler	England	1:00.61	Q
8	5	3	Chris Smith	South Africa	1:00.86	Q
9	6	3	Bailey Lello	Australia	1:00.96	Q
10	5	5	Max Morgan	England	1:01.22	Q
11	4	7	George Smith	Scotland	1:01.63	Q
12	6	7	Adrian Robinson	Botswana	1:01.65	Q
13	6	2	Joshua Mitchell	Scotland	1:01.77	Q
14	5	2	Josh Inglis	Wales	1:02.23	Q
15	5	7	Kito Campbell	Jamaica	1:02.31	Q
16	4	2	Jacob Story	Cook Islands	1:02.43	Q
17	4	3	Ronan Wantenaar	Namibia	1:02.70	R
18	6	1	Jadon Wuilliez	Antigua and Barbuda	1:02.81	R
19	6	8	Kyle Booth	Wales	1:03.25	
20	4	1	Alexandros Grigoriou	Cyprus	1:03.84	
21	5	1	Charlie-Joe Hallett	Guernsey	1:03.87	
22	3	4	Haniel Kudwoli	Kenya	1:04.30	
23	3	2	Hans Li Ying Pin	Mauritius	1:04.37	
24	2	4	Zach Moyo	Zambia	1:05.01	
25	3	1	Joshua Ross	Barbados	1:05.09	
26	5	8	Panayiotis Panaretos	Cyprus	1:05.21	
27	3	5	Jose Canjulo	Namibia	1:05.30	
28	3	3	Samuel Yalimaiwai	Fiji	1:05.60	
29	4	8	Emmanuel Gadson	Bahamas	1:05.66	
30	3	6	Alexander Turnbull	Isle of Man	1:06.20	
31	3	7	Matthew Lawrence	Mozambique	1:06.38	
32	3	8	Christian Toia	Samoa	1:06.68	
33	2	6	Jordan Ssamula	Uganda	1:07.38	
34	2	3	Carter Makira	Cook Islands	1:08.00	
35	2	2	Don Younger	Fiji	1:08.18	
36	2	5	Luis Weekes	Barbados	1:08.80	
37	2	8	Zachary Bellhouse	Isle of Man	1:09.31	
38	1	3	Thomas Chen	Papua New Guinea	1:09.87	
39	1	4	Sukumar Rajbongshi	Bangladesh	1:10.39	
40	2	1	Looth Mohamed Hussain	Maldives	1:10.63	
41	2	7	Nathan Nagapin	Seychelles	1:11.35	
42	1	6	Chase Thompson	Guyana	1:15.06	
	1	2	Lukas Robbertse	Saint Helena	DNS	
	1	5	John Samura	Sierra Leone	DNS	
	5	6	Adam Bradley	Northern Ireland	DSQ	

=== Semifinals ===
The semifinals were held at 20:31 on 24 July 2026.

Semifinal results
Rank	Heat	Lane	Swimmer	Nation	Time	Notes
1	2	4	Adam Ramsay-Peaty	England	59.19	Q
2	1	4	Sam Williamson	Australia	59.27	Q
3	2	5	Filip Nowacki	Jersey	59.52	Q
4	1	3	Oliver Dawson	Canada	59.87	Q
5	1	5	Michael Houlie	South Africa	1:00.03	Q
6	2	6	Greg Butler	England	1:00.12	Q
7	2	3	Zac Stubblety-Cook	Australia	1:00.36	Q
8	1	6	Chris Smith	South Africa	1:00.43	Q
9	2	2	Bailey Lello	Australia	1:00.83	R
10	1	2	Max Morgan	England	1:01.29	R
11	2	7	George Smith	Scotland	1:01.38	
12	1	1	Josh Inglis	Wales	1:01.42	
13	2	1	Joshua Mitchell	Scotland	1:01.44	
14	1	7	Adrian Robinson	Botswana	1:01.95	
15	2	8	Kito Campbell	Jamaica	1:02.02	
16	1	8	Jacob Story	Cook Islands	1:02.26	

=== Final ===
The finals was held at 21:04 on 25 July 2026.

Final results
Rank	Lane	Swimmer	Nation	Time	Notes
1st place, gold medalist(s)	5	Sam Williamson	Australia	59.17	
2nd place, silver medalist(s)	3	Filip Nowacki	Jersey	59.34	
3rd place, bronze medalist(s)	4	Adam Ramsay-Peaty	England	59.65	
4	6	Oliver Dawson	Canada	59.70	
5	1	Zac Stubblety-Cook	Australia	1:00.20	
6	7	Greg Butler	England	1:00.24	
7	2	Michael Houlie	South Africa	1:00.35	
8	8	Chris Smith	South Africa	1:00.79	
