= 2024 European Junior Swimming Championships =

Water sport competitions

- Host city: Vilnius, Lithuania
- Dates: 2–7 July
- Main venue: Lazdynai Swimming Pool

The 2024 European Junior Swimming Championships were held from 2 to 7 July 2024 in Vilnius, Lithuania. The Championships were for girls aged 14–17 and boys age 15–18. Championships held in newly reconstructed Lazdynai Swimming Pool.

== Medal table ==
* Host nation (Lithuania)

Rank	Nation	Gold	Silver	Bronze	Total
1	Italy	13	9	3	25
2	Hungary	4	3	4	11
3	Turkey	4	3	3	10
4	Romania	4	2	1	7
5	Lithuania*	4	1	2	7
6	Spain	3	5	3	11
7	Great Britain	3	4	6	13
8	Denmark	2	1	2	5
9	Germany	1	4	8	13
10	Croatia	1	3	0	4
11	Belgium	1	1	1	3
11	Ireland	1	1	1	3
13	Estonia	1	0	0	1
13	Greece	1	0	0	1
15	France	0	3	2	5
16	Bulgaria	0	1	2	3
17	Slovakia	0	1	0	1
18	Czech Republic	0	0	2	2
19	Austria	0	0	1	1
Totals (19 entries)		43	42	41	126

== Results ==
=== Boys ===
Games	Gold		Silver		Bronze	
50 m freestyle	Lorenzo Ballarati; Italy	22.20	Luca Hoek le Guenedal; Spain	22.33	Tajus Juška; Lithuania	22.34
100 m freestyle	Tajus Juška; Lithuania	48.74	Vlaho Nenadic; Croatia	48.80	Carlos D'Ambrosio; Italy	48.99
200 m freestyle	Kristupas Trepočka; Lithuania	1:47.74	Ahmet Burak Işık; Turkey	1:48.04	Nicholas Castella; Denmark	1:48.41
400 m freestyle	Alessandro Ragaini; Italy	3:47.96	Ahmet Burak Işık; Turkey	3:48.53 NR	Johannes Liebmann; Germany	3:49.32
800 m freestyle	Kuzey Tunçelli; Turkey	7:48.01 NR	Muhammed Yusuf Özden; Turkey	7:56.18	Johannes Liebmann; Germany	7:58.39
1500 m freestyle	Kuzey Tunçelli; Turkey	14:41.89 WJ NR	Johannes Liebmann; Germany	15:04.04	Muhammed Yusuf Özden; Turkey	15:19.56
50 m backstroke	Mantas Kaušpėdas; Lithuania	24.68 NR	Daniele del Signore; Italy	25.34	Jakub Jan Krischke; Czech Republic	25.53
100 m backstroke	Daniele del Signore; Italy	54.68	John Shortt; Ireland	54.74	Jakub Jan Krischke; Czech Republic	55.18
200 m backstroke	John Shortt; Ireland	1:57.68	Daniele del Signore; Italy	1:58.81	Alexandru Constantinescu; Romania	1:58.91
50 m breaststroke	Nusrat Allahverdi; Turkey	27.60	Subajr Biltaev; Germany	27.78	Maksim Manolov; Bulgaria	27.89
100 m breaststroke	Evangelos Efraim Ntoumas; Greece	1:00.80	Nil Cadevall Micolau; Spain; Maksim Manolov; Bulgaria	1:01.10	Not awarded	
200 m breaststroke	Doruk Yoğurtçuoğlu; Turkey	2:12.66	Filip Nowacki; Great Britain	2:12.74	Maksim Manolov; Bulgaria	2:12.89
50 m butterfly	Teo del Riego Torres; Spain	23.44	Daniele Momoni; Italy	23.54	Lukas Edl; Austria	23.62
100 m butterfly	Daniele Momoni; Italy	52.20	Maro Miknic; Croatia	52.49	Ethan Dumensil; France	52.54
200 m butterfly	Vlad-Stefan Mihalache; Romania	1:57.42	Samuel Kostal; Slovakia	1:57.62	David Antal; Hungary	1:57.67
200 m individual medley	Robert-Andrei Badea; Romania	2:00.05 NR	Nil Cadevall Micolau; Spain	2:00.34	Finn Hammer; Germany	2:01.68
400 m individual medley	Robert-Andrei Badea; Romania	4:14.37 CR, NR	Domenico de Gregorio; Italy	4:21.02	Onur Ege Öksüz; Turkey	4:22.73
4×100 m freestyle relay	Italy; Gabriele Valente; Carlos D'Ambrosio; Mirko Chiaversoli; Lorenzo Ballarati; Daniele Momoni	3:17.04	France; Alexandre Chalendar; Neo Dutriaux; Evan Galle-Michon; Ethan Dumesnil; Romeo-Cesar Fadda-Sauvageot	3:18.83	Great Britain; Gabriel Shepherd; Nicholas Finch; Stefan Krawiec; Jacob Mills	3:19.49
4×200 m freestyle relay	Italy; Alessandro Ragaini; Filippo Bertoni; Gabriele Valente; Carlos D'Ambrosio	7:12.15 CR	Germany; Lukas Fritzke; Jonathan Turck; Daniel Olenberg; Johannes Liebmann	7:19.85	Turkey; Ahmet Burak Isik; Tolga Temiz; Tuncer Berk Ertuk; Kuzey Tunçelli	7:19.99 NR
4×100 m medley relay	Italy; Daniele del Signore; Lorenzo Fuschini; Daniele Momoni; Carlos D'Ambrosio	3:37.13	Spain; Teo del Riego Torres; Nil Cadevall Micolau; Javier Lopez Guillen; Luca Hoek le Guenedal	3:38.09	Great Britain; Dean Fearn; Max Morgan; Nicholas Finch; Gabriel Shepherd	3:38.37

=== Girls ===
Games	Gold		Silver		Bronze	
50 m freestyle	Sara Curtis; Italy	24.68	Jana Pavalic; Croatia	24.92	Skye Carter; Great Britain	25.24
100 m freestyle	Sara Curtis; Italy	54.22	Lilla Minna Ábrahám; Hungary	54.28	Grace Davison; Ireland	55.11
200 m freestyle	Lilla Minna Ábrahám; Hungary	1:57.52	Rebecca-Aimee Diaconescu; Romania	1:58.97	Dora Molnar; Hungary	1:59.45
400 m freestyle	Lilla Minna Ábrahám; Hungary	4:09.85	Lucrezia Domina; Italy	4:11.01	Sarah Dumont; Belgium	4:11.48
800 m freestyle	Amelie Blocksidge; Great Britain	8:30.05	Vivien Jackl; Hungary	8:32.33	Emma Vittoria Giannelli; Italy	8:33.83
1500 m freestyle	Amelie Blocksidge; Great Britain	16:10.23	Emma Vittoria Giannelli; Italy	16:17.19	Vivien Jackl; Hungary	16:19.22
50 m backstroke	Sara Curtis; Italy	27.94	Martine Damborg; Denmark	28.27	Blythe Kinsman; Great Britain	28.29
100 m backstroke	Daria-Mariuca Silisteanu; Romania	1:00.72	Lora Komoroczy; Hungary	1:01.39	Estella Llum Tonrath Nollgen; Spain	1:01.49
200 m backstroke	Estella Llum Tonrath Nollgen; Spain	2:10.78	Aissia-Claudia Prisecariu; Romania	2:11.14	Dora Molnar; Hungary	2:11.56
50 m breaststroke	Smiltė Plytnykaitė; Lithuania	31.27	Jasmine Carter; Great Britain	31.39	Nayara Pineda Lopez; Spain	31.46
100 m breaststroke	Eneli Jefimova; Estonia	1:06.12	Smiltė Plytnykaitė; Lithuania	1:07.91	Theodora Taylor; Great Britain	1:08.59
200 m breaststroke	Lena Ludwig; Germany	2:28.70	Theodora Taylor; Great Britain	2:28.71	Hannah Schneider; Germany	2:29.30
50 m butterfly	Martine Damborg; Denmark; Jana Pavalic; Croatia	26.21 26.21 NR	Not awarded		Anna MariaBorstler; Germany	26.44
100 m butterfly	Martine Damborg; Denmark	58.75	Caterina Santambrogio; Italy	59.11	Hollie Widdows; Great Britain	59.16
200 m butterfly	Sarah Dumont; Belgium	2:09.64 NR	Laura Cabanes Garzas; Spain	2:09.96	Alina Baievych; Germany	2:10.09
200 m individual medley	Laura Cabanes Garzas; Spain	2:13.25	Phoebe Cooper; Great Britain	2:14.27	Giulia Pascareanu; Italy	2:14.37
400 m individual medley	Vivien Jackl; Hungary	4:39.28 CR	Sarah Dumont; Belgium	4:42.44	Laura Cabanes Garzas; Spain	4:43.62
4×100 m freestyle relay	Italy; Chiara Sama; Sara Curtis; Cristiana Stevanato; Caterina Santambrogio; Alessandra Gusperti; Veronica Quaggio	3:41.12	France; Maeline Bessard; Giulia Rossi-Bene; Alix Predine; Albane Cachot; Leonia Thibult; Anais Montibert; Jeanne Lechevalier	3:41.13	Germany; Linda Roth; Julianna Dora Bocska; Selina Muller; Lise Seidel; Jette Lenz	3:41.60
4×200 m freestyle relay	Hungary; Lilla Szabó; Dóra Molnár; Vivien Jackl; Lilla Minna Ábrahám; Eszter Rékasi; Glenda Abonyi-Tóth	8:01.11	Italy; Chiara Sama; Bianca Nannucci; Ludovica Terlizzi; Lucrezia Domina; Elisa Pignotti; Caterina Santambrogio; Giulia Pascareanu	8:01.71	Germany; Julianna Dora Bocska; Linda Roth; Jette Lenz; Lise Seidel; Julia Ackermann; Zara Selimovic; Selina Müller	8:04.60
4×100 m medley relay	Italy; Benedetta Boscaro; Irene Mati; Caterina Santambrogio; Sara Curtis	4:04.48	France; Jeanne Lechevalier; Rosalie Abel-Thiebaut; Alix Predine; Albane Cachot	4:05.46	Denmark; Emma Brogaard Krogh; Ida Skov Kragh; Martine Damborg; Anne Thastrup-Hansen	4:05.85

=== Mixed ===
Games	Gold		Silver		Bronze	
4×100 m freestyle relay	Italy; Carlos D'Ambrosio; Lorenzo Ballarati; Cristiana Stevanato; Sara Curtis; Mirko Chiaversoli; Veronica Quaggio; Alessandra Gusperti	3:28.34 CR	Germany; Michael Raje; Julian Koch; Lise Seidel; Julianna Dora Bocska; Noah Schötz; Jonathan Samuel Turck; Selina Müller; Jette Lenz	3:28.83	France; Ethan Dumesnil; Alexandre Chalendar; Albane Cachot; Giulia Rossi-Bene; Evan Galle-Michon; Neo Dutriaux; Leonia Thibult	3:29.11
4×100 m medley relay	Great Britain; Blythe Kinsman; Max Morgan; Nicholas Finch; Hollie Widdows; Dean Fearn; Phoebe Cooper; Izabella Okaro	3:49.55	Italy; Daniele Del Signore; Irene Mati; Daniele Momoni; Sara Curtis; Davide Lazzari; Andrea Dondoli; Caterina Santambrogio; Chiara Sama	3:49.95	Lithuania; Mantas Kaušpėdas; Smiltė Plytnykaitė; Kristupas Trepočka; Sylvia Statkevičius; Ieva Jurkūnaitė	3:50.23 NR
