= 2025 European Junior Swimming Championships =

Water sport competitions

- Host city: Šamorín, Slovakia
- Dates: 1-6 July 2025
- Main venue: X-bionic® Sphere

The 2025 European Junior Swimming Championships is held from 1 to 6 July 2025 in Šamorín, Slovakia. The Championships were for girls aged 14–17 and boys age 15–18. Championships held in X-bionic® Sphere.

== Medal table ==
Final table

* Host nation (Slovakia)

Rank	Nation	Gold	Silver	Bronze	Total
1	Great Britain	9	5	5	19
–	Neutral Individual Athletes	5	4	4	13
2	Italy	4	7	3	14
3	Spain	4	5	5	14
4	Lithuania	4	3	1	8
5	Turkey	3	1	5	9
6	France	2	2	1	5
7	Denmark	2	2	0	4
8	Romania	2	1	2	5
9	Hungary	2	0	2	4
10	Germany	1	6	3	10
11	Poland	1	1	2	4
12	Ireland	1	0	3	4
13	Austria	1	0	0	1
13	Belgium	1	0	0	1
15	Greece	0	2	1	3
16	Czech Republic	0	1	0	1
16	Estonia	0	1	0	1
16	Finland	0	1	0	1
16	Ukraine	0	1	0	1
20	Serbia	0	0	2	2
21	Norway	0	0	1	1
21	Switzerland	0	0	1	1
Totals (22 entries)		42	43	41	126

== Results ==
=== Boys ===
Games	Gold		Silver		Bronze	
50 m freestyle	Tajus Juška; Lithuania	22.14	Nikita Sheremet; Ukraine	22.17	Luca Hoek; Spain	22.28
100 m freestyle	Luca Hoek; Spain	48.25 NR	Tajus Juška; Lithuania	48.57	Justin Cvetkov; Serbia	49.03
200 m freestyle	Christian Giefing; Austria	1:46.88	Tajus Juška; Lithuania	1:47.03	Sander Kiær Sørensen; Norway	1:47.47
400 m freestyle	Gregorii Vekovishchev; Neutral Individual Athletes	3:48.71	Johannes Liebmann; Germany	3:49.07	Kuzey Tunçelli; Turkey	3:49.50
800 m freestyle	Kuzey Tunçelli; Turkey	7:46.01 CR	Gregorii Vekovishchev; Neutral Individual Athletes	7:51.49	Johannes Liebmann; Germany	7:54.09
1500 m freestyle	Kuzey Tunçelli; Turkey	14:45.05	Johannes Liebmann; Germany	14:53.15	Cristóbal Vargas; Spain	15:11.34
50 m backstroke	Georgii Iakovlev; Neutral Individual Athletes	25.04	Daniele Del Signore; Italy	25.25	Mikhail Shcherbakov; Neutral Individual Athletes	25.30
100 m backstroke	John Shortt; Ireland	54.09	Georgii Iakovlev; Neutral Individual Athletes	54.47	Nathan Muratory; France	54.75
200 m backstroke	Zsombor Rácz; Hungary	1:57.89	Daniele Del Signore; Italy	1:57.94	John Shortt; Ireland	1:58.45
50 m breaststroke	Nusrat Allahverdi; Turkey	27.24	Filip Nowacki; Great Britain	27.61	Jan Malte Gräfe; Germany	27.65
100 m breaststroke	Filip Nowacki; Great Britain	59.59	Evangelos Ntoumas; Greece	1:00.18	Nusrat Allahverdi; Turkey	1:00.24
200 m breaststroke	Filip Nowacki; Great Britain	2:08.32 CR	Doruk Yoğurtçuoğlu; Turkey	2:09.92	Michele Longobardo; Italy	2:10.88
50 m butterfly	Dean Fearn; Great Britain	23.29 CR	Jan Foltýn; Czech Republic	23.55	Nemanja Maksić; Serbia	23.78
100 m butterfly	Tajus Juška; Lithuania	52.54	Dean Fearn; Great Britain	52.64	Isak Fernández; Spain	52.72
200 m butterfly	Dávid Antal; Hungary	1:57.42	Isak Fernández; Spain	1:58.39	Tuncer Berk Ertürk; Turkey	1:58.40
200 m individual medley	Mikhail Shcherbakov; Neutral Individual Athletes	1:59.04 CR	Robert Badea; Romania	2:00.59	Iason Routoulas; Greece	2:01.18
400 m individual medley	Robert Badea; Romania	4:18.22	Cristóbal Vargas; Spain	4:19.26	Onur Ege Öksüz; Turkey	4:19.92
4×100 m freestyle relay	Italy; Francesco Ceolin; Daniele Del Signore; Luca Antonio Scampicchio; Daniel D'Agostino	3:18.34	France; Néo Dutriaux; Gabriel Crassard; Simon Meubry; Roméo-César Fadda-Sauvageot	3:19.26	Great Britain; Gabriel Shepherd; Jack Brown; Harry Milne; Rio Daodu	3:20.00
4×200 m freestyle relay	France; Raphael-Sauveur Cristofini; Gabriel Crassard; Simon Meubry; Neo Dutriaux	7:15.99	Italy; Andrea Zanin; Gabriele Valente; Francesco Pernice; Alberto Ferrazza	7:16.51	Turkey; Ahmet Mete Boylu; Tuncer Berk Ertürk; Özgür Yonca; Kuzey Tunçelli	7:20.67
4×100 m medley relay	Great Britain; Dean Fearn; Filip Nowacki; Jack Brown; Gabriel Shephard	3:38.09	Greece; Nikolaos Papatheodorou; Evangelos Efraim Ntoumas; Iason Routoulas; Nikolaos Spatharakis	3:38.96	Spain; Carlos González; Biel Martin Sole; Isak Fernández; Luca Hoek	3:39.18

=== Girls ===
Games	Gold		Silver		Bronze	
50 m freestyle	Martine Damborg; Denmark	25.00	Theodora Taylor; Great Britain Kira Manokhina; Neutral Individual Athletes	25.12	Not awarded	
100 m freestyle	Albane Cachot; France	54.17	María Daza; Spain	54.39	Grae Davison; Ireland	54.80 NR
200 m freestyle	Bianca Nannucci; Italy	1:58.41	María Daza; Spain	1:58.97	Sofiia Diakova; Neutral Individual Athletes	1:59.09
400 m freestyle	Sofia Diakova; Neutral Individual Athletes	4:07.06	Kseniia Misharina; Neutral Individual Athletes	4:07.52	Emma Vittoria Giannelli; Italy	4:09.05
800 m freestyle	Sofia Diakova; Neutral Individual Athletes	8:27.78	Emma Vittoria Giannelli; Italy	8:29.65	Amelie Blocksidge; Great Britain	8:33.78
1500 m freestyle	Amelie Blocksidge; Great Britain	16:10.23	Emma Vittoria Giannelli; Italy	16:13.11	Vivien Jackl; Hungary	16:17.42
50 m backstroke	Blythe Kinsman; Great Britain	27.79	Martine Damborg; Denmark	28.18	Daria Silișteanu; Romania	28.26
100 m backstroke	Daria Silișteanu; Romania	1:00.40	Jeanne Lechavalier; France	1:00.52	Blythe Kinsman; Great Britain	1:00.70
200 m backstroke	Estella Tonrath; Spain	2:10.02	Nahia Garrido; Spain	2:12.47	Aissia Prisecariu; Romania	2:13.10
50 m breaststroke	Smiltė Plytnykaitė; Lithuania	31.16	Egle Salu; Estonia	31.19	Nayara Pineda; Spain	31.26
100 m breaststroke	Smiltė Plytnykaitė; Lithuania	1:07.21	Lena Ludwig; Germany	1:08.10	Theodora Taylor; Great Britain	1:08.47
200 m breaststroke	Lena Ludwig; Germany	2:27.48	Paulina Baran; Poland	2:27.78	Kay-Lyn Löhr; Switzerland	2:27.95
50 m butterfly	Flawia Kamzol; Poland	26.17	Martine Damborg; Denmark	26.25	Mariia Osetrova; Neutral Individual Athletes	26.44
100 m butterfly	Martine Damborg; Denmark	58.30	Aliisa Soini; Finland	58.95	Flawia Kamzol; Poland	59.10
200 m butterfly	Sarah Dumont; Belgium	2:09.75	Edith Price; Great Britain	2:10.42	Serafima Fokina; Neutral Individual Athletes	2:11.56
200 m individual medley	Amalie Smith; Great Britain	2:12.62	Noelle Benkler; Germany	2:12.74	Grace Davison; Ireland	2:12.75
400 m individual medley	Amalie Smith; Great Britain	4:37.02 CR	Noelle Benkler; Germany	4:39.01	Vivien Jackl; Hungary	4:40.40
4×100 m freestyle relay	Spain; María Daza; Irene Ciércoles; Claudia Muñoz; Sara Costa	3:41.29	Italy; Alessandra Leoni; Ludovica Di Maria; Alessandra Mao; Caterina Santambrogio	3:41.69	Germany; Linda Roth; Leni Labarre; Zara Selimovic; Svenja Götting	3:42.36
4×200 m freestyle relay	Italy; Lucrezia Domina; Bianca Nannucci; Chiara Sama; Alessandra Mao	7:56.06 CR	Lithuania; Ieva Jurkūnaitė; Sylvia Statkevičius; Ieva Visockaitė; Ieva Nainytė	8:02.15 NR	Great Britain; Phoebe Cooper; Annabelle Compton; Hollie Wilson; Amalie Smith	8:04.12
4×100 m medley relay	Italy; Benedetta Boscaro; Irene Burato; Caterina Santambrogio; Alessandra Leoni	4:04.30	Germany; Noelle Benkler; Lena Ludwig; Yara Fay Riefstahl; Linda Roth	4:04.34	Lithuania; Emilija Pociute; Smilte Plytnykaite; Guoda Trucinskaite; Sylvia Statkevicius	4:05.22 NR

=== Mixed ===
Games	Gold		Silver		Bronze	
4×100 m freestyle relay	Spain; Luca Hoek; Darío Berdiel; Irene Ciércoles; María Daza	3:27.69 CR	Great Britain; Harry Milne; Gabriel Shepherd; Skye Carter; Theodora Taylor	3:29.06	Italy; Daniele Del Signore; Daniel D'Agostino; Alessandra Leoni; Caterina Santambrogio	3:29.37
4×100 m medley relay	Great Britain; Blythe Kinsman; Filip Nowacki; Dean Fearn; Theodora Taylor	3:47.07 CR	Italy; Daniele Del Signore; Michele Longobardo; Caterina Santambrogio; Alessandra Mao	3:50.30	Poland; Varvara Hlushchenko; Jan Gajda; Flawia Kamzol; Przemysław Pietroń	3:50.32
