= Daria Silișteanu =

Romanian swimmer (born 2009)

Personal information
- Full name: Daria-Măriuca Silișteanu
- Nationality: Romanian
- Born: 10 March 2009 (age 17)

Sport
- Sport: Swimming
- Strokes: Backstroke
Medal record
Women's swimming
Representing Romania
Youth Olympic Games
Gold medal – first place	2026 Dakar	50 m backstroke
Gold medal – first place	2026 Dakar	100 m backstroke
Silver medal – second place	2026 Dakar	100 m butterfly
World Junior Championships
Silver medal – second place	2025 Otopeni	100 m backstroke
European Junior Championships
Gold medal – first place	2024 Vilnius	100 m backstroke
Gold medal – first place	2025 Šamorín	100 m backstroke
Gold medal – first place	2026 Munich	50 m backstroke
Silver medal – second place	2023 Belgrade	100 m backstroke
Silver medal – second place	2026 Munich	100 m backstroke
Bronze medal – third place	2023 Belgrade	50 m backstroke
Bronze medal – third place	2025 Šamorín	50 m backstroke

Daria-Măriuca Silișteanu (born 10 March 2009) is a Romanian swimmer who specializes in the backstroke.

== Career ==
In July 2023, she competed at the 2023 European Junior Swimming Championships and won a bronze medal in the 50 metre backstroke at 14 years old with a Romanian record time of 28.46 seconds.

In July 2025, she competed at the 2025 European Junior Swimming Championships and won a gold medal in the 100 metre backstroke with a time of 1:00.40. She also won a bronze medal in the 50 metre backstroke with a time of 28.26 seconds. The next month she competed at the 2025 World Aquatics Junior Swimming Championships and won a silver medal in the 100 metre backstroke with a Romanian record time of 1:00.02.

In July 2026, she competed at the 2026 European Junior Swimming Championships and won a gold medal in the 50 metre backstroke with a time of 27.94. She also won a silver medal in the 100 metre backstroke with a time of 1:00.11. In November 2026, she competed at the 2026 Summer Youth Olympics and won a silver medal in the 100 metre butterfly with a time of 1:00.31. This was Romania's first medal of the 2026 Summer Olympics. She then won a gold medal in the 100 metre backstroke with a time of 59.98 seconds. She also won a gold medal in the 50 metre backstroke with a time of 27.93 seconds, setting a new national record.
