= Carlos D'Ambrosio =

Italy swimmer

Personal information
- Born: February 5, 2007 (age 19) Valdagno, Italy
- Height: 1.90 m (6 ft 3 in)
- Weight: 82 kg (181 lb)

Sport
- Sport: Swimming
Medal record
Men's swimming
Representing Italy
World Championships (LC)
Silver medal – second place	2025 Singapore	4×100 m freestyle relay
European Championships (LC)
Silver medal – second place	2026 Paris	4×100 m medley
Bronze medal – third place	2026 Paris	4x100 m mixed freestyle
World Junior Championships
Gold medal – first place	2025 Otopeni	100 m freestyle
Gold medal – first place	2025 Otopeni	200 m freestyle
Silver medal – second place	2025 Otopeni	4x100 m freestyle
Silver medal – second place	2025 Otopeni	4x200 freestyle
Silver medal – second place	2025 Otopeni	4x100 m medley
Bronze medal – third place	2025 Otopeni	4×100 m mixed freestyle
Bronze medal – third place	2025 Otopeni	50 m freestyle
European Junior Championships
Gold medal – first place	2024 Vilnius	4x100 m freestyle
Gold medal – first place	2024 Vilnius	4x200 m freestyle
Gold medal – first place	2024 Vilnius	4x100 m medley
Gold medal – first place	2024 Vilnius	4×100 m mixed freestyle
Bronze medal – third place	2024 Vilnius	100 m freestyle
European Youth Olympic Festival
Gold medal – first place	2023 Maribor	100 m freestyle
Gold medal – first place	2023 Maribor	4×100 m freestyle
Gold medal – first place	2023 Maribor	4×100 m medley
Gold medal – first place	2023 Maribor	4×100 m mixed freestyle
Gold medal – first place	2023 Maribor	4×100 m mixed medley
Silver medal – second place	2023 Maribor	200 m freestyle

Carlos D'Ambrosio (born 5 February 2007) is an Italian swimmer. He competed in the men's 4 × 200-metre freestyle relay event at the 2024 Summer Olympics. He won a silver medal at the 2025 World Aquatics Championships in the men's 4 × 100 m freestyle relay and became the youngest Italian swimmer to break the 48 second barrier in the 100 m freestyle.

== Career ==
=== 2024–2025 ===
In July 2024, D'Ambrosio competed at the Olympic Games in Paris. He competed in the 4 × 200 m freestyle relay, splitting 1:47.24 on the third leg to help Italy finish tenth in a time of 7:08.63, 0.20 seconds away from qualifying for the final.

In April 2025, D'Ambrosio went 1:41.61 in the short course 200 m freestyle, breaking Filippo Magnini's Italian record of 1:41.65 from 2009.

In July 2025, D'Ambrosio competed at the 2025 World Championships in Singapore. In the heats of the men's 4 × 100 m freestyle relay, he split 47.96 on the first leg, becoming the youngest Italian to break 48-seconds in the event. He swam the first leg again in the final, improving his personal best to 47.78. Italy won the silver medal with a time of 3:09.54, breaking the Italian record of 3:10.11 from 2021. D'Ambrosio then swam in the 200 m freestyle, where in the semifinals, he went 1:45.23 to break Filippo Megli's Italian record of 1:45.67 from 2019. He later finished sixth in the final with a time of 1:45.27. He then swam the 100 m freestyle, finishing twenty-sixth in a time of 48.67. Swimming the 4 × 200 m freestyle relay, he split 1:45.75 on the first leg, contributing to an overall time of 7:05.34 that placed Italy seventh. He then swam in the mixed 4 × 100 m freestyle relay, splitting 47.34 on the second leg. Italy finished fourth in a time of 3:21.48, setting a new Italian record and finishing 0.13 slower than the bronze medalist. He concluded the competition with the 4 × 100 m medley relay, splitting 47.33 on the freestyle leg. He was overtaken by the US' Jack Alexy; Italy finished fourth in a time of 3:28.72, 0.10 seconds behind the bronze medalist.

In August 2025, D'Ambrosio competed at the 2025 World Junior Championships in Otopeni. He split 47.20 on the anchor leg of the 4 × 100 m freestyle relay, winning the silver medal in a time of 3:16.03. He then competed in the 200 m freestyle, winning the gold medal in a time of 1:45.15. This was a new national record, and also broke the championship record of 1:46.18 set by Romanian David Popovici in 2022. He then swam the anchor leg of the mixed 4 × 100 m medley relay, finishing fifth in a time of 3:47.00. He swam the second leg of the mixed 4 × 100 m freestyle relay, splitting 47.40; Italy won the bronze medal in a time of 3:26.79. He then won the bronze medal in the 50 m freestyle, recording a time of 22.14. He won the bronze medal in the 4 × 200 m freestyle relay, splitting 1:45.60 on the anchor leg to contribute to a final time of 7:12.90. He won the 100 m freestyle in a time of 47.88. His final event was the men's 4 × 100 m medley relay, where he split 47.27 on the freestyle leg, contributing to a bronze medal result in a final time of 3:35.86.

In March 2026, D'Ambrosio broke the Italian record in the short course 200 m freestyle with a time of 1:40.69.
