= Swimming at the 2026 Commonwealth Games – Men's 4 × 100 metre freestyle relay =

Men's 4 × 100 metre freestyle relay at the 2026 Commonwealth Games
- Venue: Tollcross International Swimming Centre
- Dates: 24 July
- Winning time: 3:09.49 GR

Medalists
gold medal	Flynn Southam; Kai Taylor; Harrison Turner; Kyle Chalmers; Edward Sommerville*; Matthew Temple*; William Petric*; Jamie Jack*	Australia
silver medal	Jacob Mills; James Guy; Gabriel Shepherd; Jacob Whittle; Edward Mildred*; Cameron Brooker*; Oliver Morgan*; Thomas Dean*	England
bronze medal	Pieter Coetze; Guy Brooks; Ruard Van Renen; Chad le Clos; Kris Mihaylov*	South Africa

The men's 4 × 100 metre freestyle relay event at the 2026 Commonwealth Games was held on 24 July at the Tollcross International Swimming Centre.

== Schedule ==
The schedule is as follows:

All times are British Summer Time (UTC+1)

Date	Time	Round
Friday 24 July 2026	10:30	Heats
Friday 24 July 2026	19:00	Final

== Results ==
=== Heats ===
The heats were held on the morning of 24 July 2026.

Heat results
Rank	Heat	Lane	Nation	Swimmers	Time	Notes
1	2	4	Australia	Edward Sommerville (48.54); Matthew Temple (48.44); William Petric (49.19); Jamie Jack (48.36)	3:14.53	Q
2	2	5	England	Edward Mildred (49.06); Cameron Brooker (48.34); Oliver Morgan (49.29); Thomas Dean (47.99)	3:14.68	Q
3	1	4	Canada	Joshua Liendo (48.62); Antoine Sauve (49.14); Benjamin Winterborn (50.01); Lorne Wigginton (49.34)	3:17.11	Q
4	1	5	South Africa	Kris Mihaylov (49.64); Guy Brooks (48.61); Ruard van Renen (49.56); Chad le Clos (50.33)	3:18.14	Q
5	1	3	Scotland	Stefan Krawiec (49.95); Dean Fearn (49.11); Jensen Norris (50.30); George Smith (49.32)	3:18.68	Q
6	2	6	Malaysia	Khiew Hoe Yean (51.10); Arvin Chahal (49.93); Lim Yin Chuen (50.85); Tan Khai Xin (52.02)	3:23.90	Q
7	1	6	Isle of Man	Joel Watterson (50.75); Harry Robinson (50.51); Magnus Kelly (51.39); Peter Allen (52.04)	3:24.69	Q
8	2	2	Cayman Islands	James Allison (49.78); Danny Kish (51.72); Connor Macdonald (51.52); Elijah Bain (53.89)	3:26.91	Q
9	2	8	Namibia	Luke Beukes (51.15); Oliver Durand (50.93); José Canjulo (52.22); Ronan Wantenaar (54.25)	3:28.55	R
10	1	7	Jersey	Matthew Deffains (51.74); Sam Sterry (51.75); Isaac Dodds (52.58); Oscar Dodds (54.05)	3:30.12	R
11	2	1	Uganda	Tendo Kaumi (51.94); Jordan Samula (55.89); Jesse Ssengonzi (52.01); Tendo Mukalazi (52.63)	3:32.47	
12	1	2	Fiji	Reuben Taylor (53.38); David Young (52.34); Hansel McCraig (52.03); Don Younger (55.33)	3:33.08	
13	2	7	Guernsey	Charlie-Joe Hallett (53.96); Zachary Maiden (56.55); Henry Bolton (53.98); Ronny Hallett (54.85)	3:39.34	
14	1	1	Seychelles	Adam Moncherry (53.29); Lai Seng Iwan Chang (57.13); Nathan Nagapin (1:00.15); Amos Ferley (54.15)	3:44.72	
	2	3	Wales			DSQ

=== Final ===
The final took place during of the evening of 24 July 2026.

Final results
Rank	Lane	Nation	Swimmers	Time	Notes
1st place, gold medalist(s)	4	Australia	Flynn Southam (47.09); Kai Taylor (47.53); Harrison Turner (47.94); Kyle Chalmers (46.93)	3:09.49	GR
2nd place, silver medalist(s)	5	England	Jacob Mills (48.02); James Guy (48.24); Gabriel Shepherd (47.73); Jacob Whittle (47.70)	3:11.69	
3rd place, bronze medalist(s)	6	South Africa	Pieter Coetze (48.38); Guy Brooks (48.98); Ruard van Renen (48.34); Chad le Clos (48.29)	3:13.99	
4	2	Scotland	Evan Jones (49.26); Duncan Scott (47.48); Matthew Ward (49.27); Dean Fearn (49.26)	3:15.27	
5	3	Canada	Joshua Liendo (48.13); Antoine Sauve (48.55); Benjamin Winterborn (49.80); Lorne Wigginton (49.00)	3:15.48	
6	1	Isle of Man	Joel Watterson (50.20); Harry Robinson (50.58); Magnus Kelly (51.42); Peter Allen (51.69)	3:23.89	
7	7	Malaysia	Khiew Hoe Yean (50.93); Arvin Chahal (50.19); Lim Yin Chuen (50.60); Tan Khai Xin (52.60)	3:24.32	
8	8	Cayman Islands	James Allison (49.39); Danny Kish (52.41); Connor Macdonald (53.79); Elijah Bain (50.55)	3:26.14	NR
