= Serafima Fokina =

Russian swimmer (born 2008)

Personal information
- Native name: Серафи́ма Ефи́мовна Фо́кина
- Full name: Serafima Efimovna Fokina
- Nationality: Russian
- Born: 4 December 2008 (age 17)

Sport
- Sport: Swimming
- Strokes: Butterfly
Medal record
Women's swimming
Representing Russia
Youth Olympic Games
| Gold medal – first place | 2026 Dakar | 50 m butterfly |
| Gold medal – first place | 2026 Dakar | 100 m butterfly |
Representing Neutral Athletes
World Junior Championships
| Silver medal – second place | 2025 Otopeni | 200 m butterfly |
| Bronze medal – third place | 2025 Otopeni | 4×100 m medley |
European Junior Championships
| Gold medal – first place | 2026 Munich | 4×100 m medley |
| Silver medal – second place | 2026 Munich | 100 m butterfly |
| Silver medal – second place | 2026 Munich | 200 m butterfly |
| Bronze medal – third place | 2025 Šamorín | 200 m butterfly |
| Bronze medal – third place | 2026 Munich | 4×100 m mixed medley |

Serafima Efimovna Fokina (Russian: Серафи́ма Ефи́мовна Фо́кина; born 4 December 2008) is a Russian swimmer.

== Career ==
In April 2025, Fokina became the Russian champion in the 200 metre butterfly. In the final, she finished with a time of 2:10.46, however, this result fell short of the qualifying standard required for the World Championships (2:09.21). In July 2025, she competed at the 2025 European Junior Swimming Championships and won a bronze medal in the 200 metre butterfly with a time of 2:11.56.

In the winter of 2025, Fokina was vacationing in Kislovodsk when she slipped and fell while on a walk. She dislocated her right knee and fractured her femur. She returned to swimming in January 2026.

In July 2026, Fokina competed at the 2026 European Junior Swimming Championships and won a gold medal in the 4×100 metre medley relay, silver medals in the 100 metre butterfly and 200 metre butterfly, and a bronze medal in the mixed 4×100 metre medley relay. In November 2026, she competed at the 2026 Summer Youth Olympics in Senegal, and won a gold medal in the 100 metre butterfly with a time of 59.81 seconds. This was Russia's first medal of the 2026 Summer Youth Olympics. She also won a gold medal in the 50 metre butterfly with a time of 27.28 seconds.
