= Blythe Kinsman =

British swimmer

Personal information
- Nationality: Great Britain; England
- Born: 24 February 2007 (age 19) United Kingdom

Sport
- Sport: Swimming
- Strokes: Backstroke
- Club: Mount Kelly
- Coach: Emma Collings-Barnes
Medal record
Representing Great Britain
World Junior Championships
Bronze medal – third place	2025 Otopeni	50 m backstroke
Bronze medal – third place	2025 Otopeni	4×100 m mixed medley
European Junior Championships
Gold medal – first place	2025 Šamorín	50 m backstroke
Gold medal – first place	2025 Šamorín	4×100 m mixed medley
Gold medal – first place	2024 Vilnius	4×100 m mixed medley
Silver medal – second place	2023 Belgrade	50 m backstroke
Bronze medal – third place	2024 Vilnius	50 m backstroke
Bronze medal – third place	2025 Šamorín	100 m backstroke
European Youth Olympic Festival
Bronze medal – third place	2022 Banská Bystrica	100 m backstroke
Representing England
Commonwealth Youth Games
Gold medal – first place	2023 Trinbago	4×100 m mixed medley
Silver medal – second place	2023 Trinbago	50 m backstroke

Blythe Kinsman (born 24 February 2007) is a British competitive swimmer specializing in backstroke representing Great Britain and England in international competitions. She is a three time European Junior champion and triple World Junior medalist.

== Career ==
Kinsman trains at Mount Kelly under coach Emma Collings-Barnes. She first gained national attention in 2023 by setting a British age-group record in the 50 m backstroke (28.32) at the British Swimming Championships.

=== 2025 European Junior Championships ===
Held in Šamorín, Slovakia, Kinsman won:

- Gold – 50 m backstroke: 27.79 seconds (Championship Record)
- Gold – 4 × 100 m mixed medley relay: 3:47.07 (European Junior Record)

She led off the mixed medley relay with a 1:00.64 split, helping Great Britain break the previous European Junior record set by Russia in 2018.

=== 2025 World Junior Championships ===
At the World Juniors in Otopeni, Romania, Kinsman earned:

- Bronze – 4 × 100 m mixed medley relay
- Bronze – 50 m backstroke

Her performances contributed to Great Britain's best-ever medal haul at the event.

== Personal bests ==
Long course (50 m pool)
Event	Time	Date	Location
50 m backstroke	27.79	2 July 2025	Šamorín, Slovakia
100 m backstroke	1:00.64 (relay split)	4 July 2025	Šamorín, Slovakia
100 m backstroke	1:01.02	22 August 2025	Otopeni, Romania

== Personal life ==
Kinsman is part of the Aquatics GB Podium Potential programme and is set to join the national performance centre in Manchester. She has expressed aspirations to compete at the 2028 Olympic Games, especially with the 50 m backstroke newly added to the Olympic programme.
