= Tajus Juška =

Lithuanian swimmer

Personal information
- Nationality: Lithuanian
- Born: January 17, 2009 (age 17) Kaunas, Lithuania
- Height: 1.86 m (6 ft 1 in)

Sport
- Sport: Swimming
- Strokes: Freestyle, butterfly
- Club: Kauno PM
Medal record
Men's swimming
Representing Lithuania
World Junior Championships
Gold medal – first place	2025 Otopeni	100 m butterfly
Bronze medal – third place	2025 Otopeni	100 m freestyle
European Junior Championships
Gold medal – first place	2024 Vilnius	100 m freestyle
Gold medal – first place	2025 Šamorín	50 m freestyle
Gold medal – first place	2025 Šamorín	100 m butterfly
Silver medal – second place	2025 Šamorín	100 m freestyle
Silver medal – second place	2025 Šamorín	200 m freestyle
Silver medal – second place	2026 Munich	200 m freestyle
Bronze medal – third place	2023 Belgrade	4×100 m freestyle relay
Bronze medal – third place	2024 Vilnius	50 m freestyle
Bronze medal – third place	2026 Munich	100 m freestyle

Tajus Juška (born 17 January 2009) is a Lithuanian swimmer who specializes in freestyle and butterfly events. He is a World Junior Champion, having won the gold medal in the 100-metre butterfly event at the 2025 World Aquatics Junior Swimming Championships in Otopeni.

In addition to his global title, Juška has won multiple medals at the European Junior Swimming Championships, including individual gold in the 100-metre freestyle in Vilnius (2024) and in the 50-metre freestyle and 100-metre butterfly in Šamorín (2025).

== Personal bests ==
As of 15 August 2026

Event	Time	Meet	Date	Note(s)
50m freestyle (long course)	22.14	European Junior Championships	4 July 2025	
100m freestyle (long course)	48.57	European Junior Championships	6 July 2025	
200m freestyle (long course)	1:45.83	European Junior Championships	8 July 2026	
50m butterfly (long course)	23.76	Akvile Lithuanian Swimming Championships	4 April 2025	
100m butterfly (long course)	51.83	World Junior Championships	21 August 2025	NR
200m butterfly (long course)	2:03.49	Mare Nostrum	22 May 2025	
