= Aissia-Claudia Prisecariu =

Romanian swimmer (born 2008)

Personal information
- National team: Romania
- Born: 15 April 2008 (age 18) Fălticeni, Suceava County, Romania

Sport
- Sport: Swimming
- Strokes: Backstroke
- Club: CSM Constanța
- Coach: Andrei Pinticanu, Luis Lăcătuș

Aissia-Claudia Prisecariu (born 15 April 2008) is a Romanian swimmer who specializes in the backstroke. She won the silver medal in 2024 and bronze medals in 2025 and 2026 in the 200 m backstroke at the European Junior Swimming Championships, and in February 2026 she won the 100 m backstroke at the European Ice Swimming Championships in Molveno, setting an International Ice Swimming Association (IISA) world record.

== Early years ==
Prisecariu was born in Fălticeni, where she took up competitive swimming under coaches Andrei Pinticanu and Luis Lăcătuș.

She trained at the pool in Fălticeni alongside Daria Silișteanu and competed for ACS "Nada Florilor" Fălticeni. In 2022, aged 14, she won seven gold medals and set three national records at the Romanian Cup for seniors, youth and juniors. In November of that year, at the national short course championships in Otopeni, she won nine medals, including the senior national titles in the 50, 100 and 200 m backstroke, with national records in all three events. In the 100 m backstroke she swam 59.84 and became the first Romanian woman to go under a minute in the event, breaking the record of 1:00.97 set by Diana Mocanu in 2001. Her time of 2:08.97 in the 200 m backstroke was the first under 2:09 by a Romanian woman; the previous record, 2:09.29, had been held by Carina Macavei since 2016. She won the 50 m backstroke in 28.30, breaking another of Mocanu's records, also set in 2001.

At 14 she moved to Bucharest, following her coaches, and joined CS Dinamo București together with Silișteanu.

== Junior career ==
In July 2022 she was part of Romania's squad at the European Junior Championships in Otopeni, where she finished sixth in the 200 m backstroke final. A few weeks later, at the European Youth Olympic Festival in Banská Bystrica, she won silver in the 200 m backstroke in 2:15.95, behind Spain's Nahia Garrido Malvar. At the same event she also won silver in the 100 m backstroke and in the mixed 4×100 m medley relay, and bronze in the girls' 4×100 m medley relay. At the 2023 edition of the festival, held in Maribor, she won the 200 m backstroke in 2:11.73, a national record for 15-year-olds. She also won gold with the girls' 4×100 m freestyle relay.

At the 2024 European Junior Championships in Vilnius, she finished second in the 200 m backstroke in 2:11.14, 0.36 seconds behind the Spanish winner. A year later, in Šamorín, she took bronze in the same event in 2:13.10, behind Spain's Estella Tonrath and Nahia Garrido Malvar. In August 2025, at the World Junior Championships in Otopeni, she placed sixth in the 100 m backstroke final in 1:00.59.

In July 2026, at the European Junior Championships in Munich, she again won bronze in the 200 m backstroke. She was initially disqualified for an illegal turn, but the Romanian delegation's appeal was upheld and she was awarded the bronze medal with a time of 2:11.58.

== Senior career ==
In December 2023 she was part of the women's 4×50 m freestyle relay that set a national record at the European Short Course Championships. At the 2024 European Aquatics Championships in Belgrade, she qualified for the 200 m backstroke final with the seventh-fastest time in the semi-finals, 2:11.63, and also finished seventh in the final, in 2:11.00. In November 2024, at the national short course championships, she set the national record in the 200 m backstroke at 2:04.63. At the April 2026 national long course championships in Otopeni, where she competed for CSM Constanța, she won the 200 m backstroke in 2:12.74 and the mixed 4×100 m medley relay with the club's team.

== Ice swimming ==
Coached by Andrei Pinticanu, Prisecariu was selected for Romania's team at the European Ice Swimming Championships in Molveno, Italy, held from 3 to 7 February 2026. Competitions organized by the IISA are held in water below 5 °C, without wetsuits. On 4 February she won the 100 m backstroke in 1:07.04, an IISA world record; Russia's Diana Musaelian and Elena Kulikova finished second and third. At the same championships she won silver in the mixed 4×50 m medley relay with Andrei Iaschiu, Daria Silișteanu and Alexandru Găman, in 1:51.80.
