= Bogdan Toropkin =

Russian swimmer (born 2009)

Personal information
- Nationality: Russian
- Born: 22 August 2009 (age 17)

Sport
- Sport: Swimming
- Strokes: Freestyle
Medal record
Men's swimming
Representing Russia
Youth Olympic Games
Gold medal – first place	2026 Dakar	100 m freestyle
Gold medal – first place	2026 Dakar	200 m freestyle
Silver medal – second place	2026 Dakar	400 m freestyle
Representing Neutral Athletes
European Junior Championships
Gold medal – first place	2026 Munich	4×100 m freestyle relay
Gold medal – first place	2026 Munich	4×200 m freestyle relay
Bronze medal – third place	2026 Munich	200 m freestyle

Bogdan Toropkin (Russian: Богдан Торопкин; born 22 August 2009) is a Russian swimmer.

== Career ==
In July 2026, Toropkin ompeted at the 2026 European Junior Swimming Championships and won a gold medal in the 4×100 metre freestyle relay with a world junior record time of 3:12.75. He also won a gold medal in the 4×200 metre freestyle relay with a championships record time of 7:09.16.

In November 2026, Toropkin competed at the 2026 Summer Youth Olympics in Senegal, and won a gold medal in the 100 metre freestyle with a time of 49.66 seconds. He also won a silver medal in the 400 metre freestyle with a time of 3:50.46.
