= Swimming at the 2026 Summer Youth Olympics – Women's 100 metre butterfly =

Women's 100 metre butterfly at the 2026 Summer Youth Olympics
- Venue: Complexe Tour de l'Oeuf
- Dates: 1 November
- Competitors: 19 from 19 nations
- Winning time: 59.81

Medalists
| gold medal | Serafima Fokina | Russia |
| silver medal | Daria Silișteanu | Romania |
| bronze medal | Ana Júlia Amaral | Brazil |

The women's 100 metre butterfly event at the 2026 Summer Youth Olympics took place on 1 November at the Complexe Tour de l'Oeuf in Dakar, Senegal.

== Results ==
=== Heats ===
The heats were started at 10:38.

| Rank | Heat | Lane | Name | Nationality | Time | Notes |
|---|---|---|---|---|---|---|
| 1 | 2 | 4 | Serafima Fokina | Russia | 1:00.19 | Q |
| 2 | 3 | 5 | Ana Júlia Amaral | Brazil | 1:01.48 | Q |
| 3 | 2 | 5 | Michelle Surjadi Fang | Indonesia | 1:01.50 | Q |
| 4 | 2 | 4 | Daria Silișteanu | Romania | 1:02.14 | Q |
| 5 | 3 | 2 | Stela Megelová | Slovakia | 1:02.57 | Q |
| 6 | 1 | 4 | Maari Randväli | Estonia | 1:02.96 | Q |
| 7 | 3 | 6 | Luciana de Armas | Uruguay | 1:03.09 | Q |
| 8 | 1 | 5 | Shannon Tan Yan Qing | Malaysia | 1:03.47 | Q |
| 9 | 1 | 3 | Zofia Kowalska-Frączyk | Poland | 1:03.97 | |
| 10 | 3 | 3 | Taisiia Larionova | Ukraine | 1:04.00 | |
| 11 | 1 | 6 | Lilli Paier | Austria | 1:05.64 | |
| 12 | 2 | 3 | Alicia Story | Cook Islands | 1:07.86 | |
| 13 | 2 | 6 | Saleste Gibson | Bahamas | 1:08.47 | |
| 14 | 1 | 2 | Maggie Mewett | Bermuda | 1:12.74 | |
| 15 | 2 | 2 | Filbertha Demello | Tanzania | 1:14.16 | |
| 16 | 2 | 7 | Omolola Akinsanmi | Nigeria | 1:15.69 | |
| 17 | 3 | 7 | Sara Al-Qarooni | Bahrain | 1:17.82 | |
| 18 | 1 | 7 | Danielle Kanjadza | Malawi | 1:30.41 | |
| 19 | 3 | 1 | Elham Hussien | Ethiopia | 1:37.17 | |

=== Final ===
The final was held at 15:30.

| Rank | Lane | Name | Nationality | Time | Notes |
|---|---|---|---|---|---|
| 1st place, gold medalist(s) | 4 | Serafima Fokina | Russia | 59.81 | |
| 2nd place, silver medalist(s) | 6 | Daria Silișteanu | Romania | 1:00.31 | |
| 3rd place, bronze medalist(s) | 5 | Ana Júlia Amaral | Brazil | 1:00.49 | |
| 4 | 7 | Maari Randväli | Estonia | 1:00.97 | |
| 5 | 3 | Michelle Surjadi Fang | Indonesia | 1:01.33 | |
| 6 | 1 | Luciana de Armas | Uruguay | 1:02.41 | |
| 7 | 2 | Stela Megelová | Slovakia | 1:02.57 | |
| 8 | 8 | Shannon Tan Yan Qing | Malaysia | 1:04.29 | |
