= John Shortt (swimmer) =

Irish swimmer

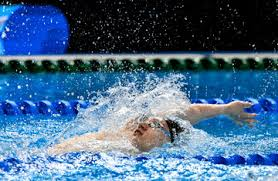
- John Shortt (IRL) competing at the World Aquatics Junior championships in 2025.

Personal information
- Nationality: Ireland
- Born: 7 February 2007 (age 19) Galway, Ireland

Sport
- Sport: Swimming
- Strokes: Backstroke
- Club: National Centre Limerick
- Coach: John Szaranek
Medal record
Representing Ireland
European Championships (SC)
Gold medal – first place	2025 Lublin	200 m backstroke
World Junior Championships
Gold medal – first place	2025 Otopeni	100 m backstroke
Gold medal – first place	2025 Otopeni	200 m backstroke
Bronze medal – third place	2025 Otopeni	50 m backstroke
European Junior Championships
Gold medal – first place	2024 Vilnius	200 m backstroke
Gold medal – first place	2025 Samorin	100 m backstroke
Silver medal – second place	2024 Vilnius	100 m backstroke
Bronze medal – third place	2025 Samorin	200 m backstroke

John Shortt (born 7 February 2007) is an Irish competitive swimmer specialising in backstroke. He is a double gold medallist at the 2025 World Aquatics Junior Swimming Championships and holds multiple Irish national records.

== Career ==
Shortt began swimming with Bluefin Swimming Club in Kilcornan, Clarinbridge, before joining the National Centre Limerick. He first gained international recognition at the 2024 European Junior Swimming Championships in Vilnius, Lithuania, where he won gold in the 200 m backstroke (1:57.68) and silver in the 100 m backstroke (54.74).

In 2025, Shortt competed at the senior World Aquatics Championships in Singapore, finishing 15th in the 200 m backstroke (1:57.30) and 26th in the 100 m backstroke (54.26).

At the 2025 World Aquatics Junior Swimming Championships in Otopeni, Romania, Shortt had a breakout performance, winning the 100-metre/200-metre backstroke double, along with the bronze medal in the 50-metre backstroke.:

- Gold, 100 m backstroke: 53.86 seconds;
- Gold, 200 m backstroke: 1:56.19, setting both a new Irish senior and junior record
- Bronze, 50 m backstroke: 25.06 seconds

He became only the second Irish swimmer to win a World Junior title, following Mona McSharry in 2017.

== Personal bests ==
Long course (50 m pool)
Event	Time	Date	Location
50 m backstroke	25.01	20 March 2026	Paris, France
100 m backstroke	53.17 NR	9 April 2026	Bangor, Ireland
200 m backstroke	1:55.31 NR	11 August 2026	Paris, France

== Personal life ==
Shortt was born in Galway and attended Calasanctius College.
