= Amalie Smith =

British junior swimmer

Personal information
- Full name: Amalie Smith
- Nationality: Great Britain; England
- Born: August 24, 2009 (age 17)

Sport
- Sport: Swimming
- Strokes: Individual medley, breaststroke
- Club: Royal Tunbridge Wells Monson SC
Medal record
Representing Great Britain
European Championships (LC)
Gold medal – first place	2026 Paris	4×200 m freestyle
Silver medal – second place	2026 Paris	400 m medley
World Junior Championships
Silver medal – second place	2025 Otopeni	200 m medley
Silver medal – second place	2025 Otopeni	400 m medley
European Junior Championships
Gold medal – first place	2025 Šamorín	200 m medley
Gold medal – first place	2025 Šamorín	400 m medley
Gold medal – first place	2026 Munich	400 m medley
Gold medal – first place	2026 Munich	4x100 m freestyle
Silver medal – second place	2026 Munich	4x100 m mixed freestyle
Bronze medal – third place	2026 Munich	4x200 m freestyle
Representing England
Commonwealth Games
Silver medal – second place	2026 Glasgow	400 m medley
Silver medal – second place	2026 Glasgow	4×100 m freestyle
Bronze medal – third place	2026 Glasgow	200 m medley

Amalie Smith (born 24 August 2009) is a British swimmer specialising in individual medley and breaststroke. She won two gold medals at the 2025 European Junior Swimming Championships, a further gold at the 2026 European Junior Swimming Championships, and two silver medals at the 2025 World Aquatics Junior Swimming Championships. Moving into senior swimming, she won three medals for England at the 2026 Commonwealth Games, including an individual silver in the 400 metres individual medley, before winning her first European senior gold medal, swimming the heat for Great Britain in the women's 4 x 200 freestyle relay at the 2026 European Aquatics Championships.

== Early life ==
Amalie Smith was born on 24 August 2009 in Tonbridge, Kent, England.

== Career ==
=== 2025 European Junior Swimming Championships ===
At the 2025 European Junior Swimming Championships in Šamorín, Slovakia, Smith claimed gold in the 200 metre individual medley in a championship-record 2:12.62. She followed that up with gold in the 400 metre individual medley, posting a personal best of 4:37.02 to become the fastest 15-year-old in British history over that distance.

=== 2025 World Aquatics Junior Swimming Championships ===
At the 2025 World Aquatics Junior Swimming Championships in Otopeni, Romania, Smith won silver in the 400 metre individual medley with a time of 4:35.49, finishing behind Argentina's Agostina Hein who set a new championship record of 4:34.34. Two days before her 16th birthday, she added silver in the 200 metre individual medley in 2:11.07, setting a new British age-group record for 15-year-olds.

== Personal bests ==
Event	Time	Venue	Year
200 metre individual medley	2:11.07	Otopeni, Romania	2025
400 metre individual medley	4:34.34	Otopeni, Romania	2025
