= Jacob Mills =

British swimmer (born 2007)

Personal information
- Nationality: British (English)
- Born: 5 September 2007 (age 19) England
- Height: 1.97 m (6 ft 6 in)

Sport
- Sport: Swimming
- Event: freestyle
- Club: City of Leicester SC / Repton Swimming
Medal record
Representing Great Britain
World Junior Championships
Silver medal – second place	2025 Otepemi	50 m freestyle
Silver medal – second place	2025 Otepemi	100 m freestyle
Silver medal – second place	2025 Otepemi	4x100 m freestyle
Silver medal – second place	2025 Otepemi	4x100 m medley
Bronze medal – third place	2025 Otepemi	4×100 m mixed medley
European Junior Championships
Bronze medal – third place	2024 Vilnius	4×100 m freestyle
European Youth Olympic Festival
Silver medal – second place	2023 Maribor	4x100 m medley
Silver medal – second place	2023 Maribor	4×100 m mixed freestyle
Representing England
Commonwealth Games
Silver medal – second place	2026 Glasgow	4×100 m freestyle

Jacob Mills (born 5 September 2007) is a swimmer from England.

== Career ==
In 2024, Mills was selected for the Great Britain junior squad for the 2024 European Junior Swimming Championships in Vilnius, Lithuania, where he won a bronze medal in the 4 × 100 m freestyle relay.

In 2025, Mills broke two British records for the age categories for 17 and 18-year-olds, recording 48.11 seconds in the qualifying heats of the 100 metres freestyle event at the 2025 Aquatics GB Swimming Championships.

In the final, Mills finished second to Matt Richards, which sealed a qualification place for the 2025 World Aquatics Championships in Singapore. Mills also finished runner-up to Ben Proud in the 50 metres freestyle. Subsequently, at the World Championships, he placed fourth in the final of the freestyle relay.
