= Max Morgan =

British swimmer

Personal information
- Nationality: British (English)
- Born: 9 January 2008 (age 18) England
- Height: 6’7

Sport
- Sport: Swimming
- Event: Breaststroke
- Club: Reed's SC
Medal record
Representing Great Britain
World Junior Championships
Bronze medal – third place	2025 Otepeni	100 m breaststroke
Bronze medal – third place	2025 Otepeni	4×100 m mixed medley
European Junior Championships
Gold medal – first place	2024 Vilnius	4×100 m mixed medley
Gold medal – first place	2026 Munich	50 m breaststroke
Bronze medal – third place	2024 Vilnius	4×100 medley
Bronze medal – third place	2026 Munich	100 m breaststroke
Bronze medal – third place	2026 Munich	4×100 m medley

Max Morgan (born 9 January 2008) is a swimmer from England who is a British champion and European Junior gold medallist.

== Career ==
Morgan won two medals at the 2024 European Junior Swimming Championships, winning gold in the 4×100 mixed medley relay and bronze in the 6x100 m medley relay. The success earned a nomination for the British Swimming's Emerging Athlete of the Year.

Morgan was named in the 2025 World Class Programme aimed at the 2028 Summer Olympics.

In 2025, Morgan became the British champion after winning the 50 metres breaststroke title at the 2025 Aquatics GB Swimming Championships. He also finished runner-up to Greg Butler in the 100 metres breaststroke event and earned selection for the 2025 World Aquatics Championships in Singapore.
