= Filip Nowacki =

British swimmer

Personal information
- Nationality: Great Britain; Jersey
- Born: 1 October 2007 (age 18) Jersey, Channel Islands

Sport
- Sport: Swimming
- Strokes: Breaststroke
- Club: Millfield & Tigers Jersey
- Coach: Keiron Piper
Medal record
Representing Great Britain
European Championships (LC)
Gold medal – first place	2026 Paris	200 m breaststroke
World Junior Championships
Gold medal – first place	2025 Otopeni	100 m breaststroke
Gold medal – first place	2025 Otopeni	200 m breaststroke
Silver medal – second place	2025 Otopeni	4 x 100 m medley
Bronze medal – third place	2025 Otopeni	4 x 100 m mixed medley
European Junior Championships
Gold medal – first place	2025 Šamorín	100 m breaststroke
Gold medal – first place	2025 Šamorín	200 m breaststroke
Gold medal – first place	2025 Šamorín	4 x 100 m medley
Gold medal – first place	2025 Šamorín	4 x 100 m mixed medley
Silver medal – second place	2025 Šamorín	50 m breaststroke
Silver medal – second place	2024 Vilnius	200 m breaststroke
European Youth Olympic Festival
Silver medal – second place	2023 Maribor	200 m breaststroke
Representing Jersey
Commonwealth Games
Gold medal – first place	2026 Glasgow	200 m breaststroke
Silver medal – second place	2026 Glasgow	100 m breaststroke
Commonwealth Youth Games
Silver medal – second place	2023 Trinbago	50 m breaststroke
Silver medal – second place	2023 Trinbago	100 m breaststroke
Bronze medal – third place	2023 Trinbago	200 m breaststroke
Island Games
Gold medal – first place	2025 Orkney	50 m breaststroke
Gold medal – first place	2025 Orkney	100 m breaststroke
Gold medal – first place	2025 Orkney	200 m breaststroke
Gold medal – first place	2025 Orkney	50 m butterfly
Gold medal – first place	2025 Orkney	100 m butterfly
Gold medal – first place	2025 Orkney	100 m ind. medley
Gold medal – first place	2025 Orkney	200 m ind. medley
Gold medal – first place	2025 Orkney	4 x 100 m medley
Silver medal – second place	2025 Orkney	4 x 50 m freestyle
Bronze medal – third place	2025 Orkney	4 x 50 m medley
Bronze medal – third place	2025 Orkney	4 x 50 m mixed medley

Filip Nowacki (born 1 October 2007) is a British competitive swimmer who specialises in breaststroke. Representing Great Britain, he won gold medals in both the 100 m and 200 m breaststroke at the 2025 World Aquatics Junior Swimming Championships in Otopeni, Romania, setting multiple records in the process. In the same year, he won four gold medals at the 2025 European Junior Swimming Championships in Šamorín, Slovakia, and eight gold medals, representing Jersey, at the 2025 Island Games in Orkney.

At the 2026 Commonwealth Games, he won the first ever swimming medal for Jersey with silver in the men's 100 metre breaststroke. The following day he won Jersey's first gold in the pool, winning the men's 200 metre breaststroke.

== Career ==
Nowacki started training with Tigers Jersey and is now coached at Millfield by Keiron Piper. He first gained international attention at the 2023 European Youth Summer Olympic Festival (EYOF) in Maribor, Slovenia, where he won silver in the 200 m breaststroke, before winning three medals at the 2023 Commonwealth Youth Games in Port-of-Spain, Trinidad. During this period, he was still training at Tigers Jersey under Nathan Jegou.

In July 2025, Nowacki won gold in the 200 m breaststroke at the 2025 European Junior Swimming Championships in Šamorín, Slovakia, breaking the European junior record with a time of 2:08.32, before completing the double by winning the 100 m breaststroke. He won two further gold medals swimming the breaststroke leg in the medley and mixed medley relays.

At the 2025 World Aquatics Junior Swimming Championships, Nowacki delivered standout performances:

- On 20 August, he won the 100 m breaststroke in 59.20 seconds, breaking his own British age group record.
- On 22 August, he claimed gold in the 200 m breaststroke with a time of 2:07.32, setting a new Championship, British age group, and European junior record.

He defeated Japan's Shin Ohashi in both finals, who holds the World Junior Record in the 100 m breaststroke.

During the 2026 Commonwealth Games, Nowacki won Jersey's first medal since 1990 with a silver in the 100m breaststroke. During the same event, Nowacki won a gold in the 200m breaststroke with a time of 2:07.87, becoming Jersey's most decorated athlete at the commonwealth games and winning Jersey's first gold medal since 1990.

In August 2026, during the 2026 European Aquatics Championships, Nowacki won a gold medal in the 200m breaststroke with a time of 2:07.70.

== Records ==
As of August 2025, Nowacki holds:

- British age group record (17 years) – 100 m breaststroke: 59.20
- British age group record (17 years) – 200 m breaststroke: 2:07.32
- European junior record – 200 m breaststroke: 2:07.32

== Personal life ==
Nowacki was born in Jersey to Polish parents. He represents Great Britain in international competitions, and Jersey at the Island Games and the Commonwealth and Commonwealth Youth Games. He is known for his strong back-half splits and tactical race execution, particularly in the 200 m breaststroke.

== Personal bests ==
Long course (50 m pool)
Event	Time	Date	Location
100 m breaststroke	59.20	20 August 2025	Otopeni, Romania
200 m breaststroke	2:07.32	22 August 2025	Otopeni, Romania

== Achievements ==
- Double gold medalist – 2025 World Junior Championships (100 m & 200 m breaststroke)
- Quadruple gold medalist – 2025 European Junior Championships (100 m & 200 m breaststroke, 4 × 100 m medley relay & mixed medley relay)
- Eight-time gold medalist - 2025 Island Games (50 m, 100m, & 200 m breaststroke, 50 m & 100 m butterfly, 100 m & 200 m individual medley, 4 × 100 m medley relay)
- Silver medalist – 2023 EYOF (200 m breaststroke)
- Silver medalist – 2023 Commonwealth Youth Games (50 m & 100 m breaststroke)
- Silver medalist – 2026 Commonwealth Games (100 m breaststroke)
- Gold medalist – 2026 Commonwealth Games (200 m breaststroke)
- Gold medalist - 2026 European Aquatics Championships (200 m breaststroke)
