= Theodora Taylor =

British swimmer

Personal information
- Nationality: British
- Born: February 21, 2009 (age 17) United Kingdom

Sport
- Sport: Swimming
- Strokes: Freestyle, Breaststroke
- Club: Torfaen Dolphins
Medal record
Representing Great Britain
European Championships (LC)
Gold medal – first place	2026 Paris	4×200 m freestyle
Gold medal – first place	2026 Paris	4×100 m medley
World Aquatics Junior Championships
Silver medal – second place	2025 Otopeni	50 m freestyle
Silver medal – second place	2025 Otopeni	4×100 m mixed freestyle
Bronze medal – third place	2025 Otopeni	100 m freestyle
Bronze medal – third place	2025 Otopeni	4×100 m mixed medley
European Youth Olympic Festival
Gold medal – first place	2023 Maribor	50 m freestyle
Silver medal – second place	2023 Maribor	100 m breaststroke
Silver medal – second place	2023 Maribor	4x100 m freestyle
Silver medal – second place	2023 Maribor	4x100 m medley
Silver medal – second place	2023 Maribor	4x100 m mixed freestyle
European Junior Championships
Gold medal – first place	2025 Samorin	4x100 m mixed medley
Gold medal – first place	2026 Munich	50 m freestyle
Gold medal – first place	2026 Munich	4x100 m freestyle
Silver medal – second place	2025 Samorin	50 m freestyle
Silver medal – second place	2025 Samorin	100 m breaststroke
Silver medal – second place	2025 Samorin	4x100 m mixed freestyle
Silver medal – second place	2024 Vilnius	200 m breaststroke
Silver medal – second place	2026 Munich	4x100 m mixed freestyle
Bronze medal – third place	2024 Vilnius	100 m breaststroke
Bronze medal – third place	2026 Munich	4x200 m freestyle
Representing Wales
Commonwealth Youth Games
Silver medal – second place	2023 Trinbago	50 m freestyle
Silver medal – second place	2023 Trinbago	100 m breaststroke
Bronze medal – third place	2023 Trinbago	50 m breaststroke
Bronze medal – third place	2023 Trinbago	200 m breaststroke
Bronze medal – third place	2023 Trinbago	200 m medley
Bronze medal – third place	2023 Trinbago	4x200 m freestyle

Theodora Taylor (born 21 February 2009) is a British competitive swimmer who specialises in freestyle and breaststroke events. She is a double European champion in relay events for Great Britain.

Taylor has represented Great Britain and Wales at multiple international youth and junior competitions, earning medals at the World Aquatics Junior Championships, Commonwealth Youth Games, European Youth Olympic Festival, and European Junior Championships.

== Career ==
Taylor made her international debut at the 2023 Commonwealth Youth Games in Trinidad and Tobago, where she won five individual medals for Wales. Her haul included silver medals in the 50 metre freestyle (25.54) and 100 metre breaststroke (1:10.39), as well as bronze medals in the 50 metre breaststroke (32.60), 200 metre breaststroke (2:32.91), and 200 metre individual medley (2:19.59). She also placed fifth in both the 100 metre freestyle and 50 metre butterfly finals, and won a bronze medal with the Wales team in the 4 x 200 m freestyle relay.

In July 2023, Taylor represented Great Britain at the European Youth Olympic Festival in Maribor. She won gold in the 50 metre freestyle with a time of 25.54 and silver in the 100 metre breaststroke (1:09.77), confirming her status as one of the top junior sprinters in Europe. A further three silver medals in relay events were also collected

In 2024, Taylor was selected again for the European Junior Swimming Championships in Vilnius, winning silver in the 200 metre breaststroke, and bronze in the 100 metre breaststroke.

At the 2025 European Junior Swimming Championships held in Šamorín, she won silver in the 50 metre freestyle, finishing behind Denmark’s Martine Damborg, and silver in the 100 metre breaststroke. She was then part of the Great Britain team to win the gold medal in the 4 x 100 metre mixed medley relay, her first European Junior gold medal.

Taylor was selected for the 2025 World Aquatics Junior Championships in Otopeni, Romania, where she won silver in the 50 metre freestyle, bronze in the 100 metre freestyle with a time of 54.20, silver in the 4×100 metre mixed freestyle relay (54.06 split), and bronze in the 4×100 metre medley relay (54.02 freestyle leg). She also reached the final of the 50 metre breaststroke, placing seventh (31.44).

== Personal life ==
Taylor trains with Torfaen Dolphins and is affiliated with Swim Wales.
