= 2025 World Aquatics Junior Swimming Championships =

Swimming event in Otopeni, Romania

World Aquatics Junior Swimming Championships 2025
- Host city: Otopeni, Romania
- Date: 19–24 August

The 10th World Aquatics Junior Swimming Championships were held in Otopeni, Romania, from 19 to 24 August 2025.

== Medal summary ==
=== Medal table ===
* Host nation (Romania)

Rank	Nation	Gold	Silver	Bronze	Total
1	United States	10	6	6	22
2	Neutral Athletes B	5	5	5	15
3	China	5	3	3	11
4	Japan	4	8	6	18
5	Great Britain	3	7	5	15
6	Italy	3	2	7	12
7	Turkey	3	0	1	4
8	Lithuania	2	1	1	4
9	Ireland	2	0	1	3
10	South Korea	1	1	1	3
11	Argentina	1	1	0	2
12	Australia	1	0	0	1
12	New Zealand	1	0	0	1
12	South Africa	1	0	0	1
12	Ukraine	1	0	0	1
16	Germany	0	3	0	3
17	Romania*	0	1	1	2
18	Brazil	0	1	0	1
18	Hungary	0	1	0	1
18	Nigeria	0	1	0	1
21	Canada	0	0	1	1
21	Croatia	0	0	1	1
21	Czech Republic	0	0	1	1
21	Denmark	0	0	1	1
21	Greece	0	0	1	1
Totals (25 entries)		43	41	42	126

Source: Medal table

=== Men ===
Event	Gold		Silver		Bronze	
50 m freestyle	Nikita Sheremet; Ukraine	21.99	Jacob Mills; Great Britain	22.02	Carlos D'Ambrosio; Italy	22.14
100 m freestyle	Carlos D'Ambrosio; Italy	47.88	Jacob Mills; Great Britain	48.22	Tajus Juška; Lithuania	48.72
200 m freestyle	Carlos D'Ambrosio; Italy	1:45.15; CR, NR	Xu Haibo; China	1:46.67	Raito Numata; Japan	1:46.70
400 m freestyle	Grigorii Vekovishchev; Neutral Athletes B	3:46.64	Egor Babinich; Neutral Athletes B	3:47.57	Xu Haibo; China	3:47.73
800 m freestyle	Kuzey Tunçelli; Turkey	7:46.52	Kazushi Imafuku; Japan	7:48.34 NR	Grigorii Vekovishchev; Neutral Athletes B	7:50.04
1500 m freestyle	Kuzey Tunçelli; Turkey	14:48.81	Kazushi Imafuku; Japan	14:56.97	Vasileios Kakoulakis; Greece	15:00.29
50 m backstroke	Georgii Iakovlev; Neutral Athletes B	24.91	Not awarded		John Shortt; Ireland	25.06
50 m backstroke	Daniele Del Signore; Italy	24.91	Not awarded		John Shortt; Ireland	25.06
100 m backstroke	John Shortt; Ireland	53.86	Georgii Iakovlev; Neutral Athletes B	53.94	Gavin Keogh; United States	54.06
200 m backstroke	John Shortt; Ireland	1:56.19; NR	Daniele Del Signore; Italy	1:57.99	David Melnychuk; United States	1:58.13
50 m breaststroke	Nusrat Allahverdi; Turkey	26.98	Jan Malte Grafe; Germany	26.99	Shin Ohashi; Japan	27.12
100 m breaststroke	Filip Nowacki; Great Britain	59.20	Shin Ohashi; Japan	59.50	Max Morgan; Great Britain	59.93
200 m breaststroke	Filip Nowacki; Great Britain	2:07.32; CR	Shin Ohashi; Japan	2:07.56	Gabe Nunziata; United States	2:09.70
50 m butterfly	Dean Fearn; Great Britain	23.54	Abdul Jabar Adama; Nigeria	23.64	Jan Foltýn; Czech Republic	23.65
100 m butterfly	Tajus Juška; Lithuania	51.83 NR	Lucio Flavio de Paula Filho; Brazil	52.01	Dean Fearn; Great Britain	52.33
200 m butterfly	Kris Mihaylov; South Africa	1:56.16	David Antal; Hungary	1:56.87	Tuncer Berk Ertürk; Turkey	1:58.21
200 m individual medley	Mikhail Shcherbakov; Neutral Athletes B	1:57.25; CR	Yumeki Kojima; Japan	1:57.32	Raito Numata; Japan	1:57.98
400 m individual medley	Raito Numata; Japan	4:11.37	Yumeki Kojima; Japan	4:12.99	Robert-Andrei Badea; Romania	4:13.79 NR
4×100 m freestyle relay	Neutral Athletes B Mikhail Shcherbakov (49.13); Roman Zhidkov (48.37); Egor Proshin (48.98); Georgii Zlotnikov (48.90); Matvei Nesterov^{[a]}	3:15.38; WJ	Italy (ITA); Francesco Ceolin (50.15); Daniel D'Agostino (49.40); Daniele Del Signore (49.28); Carlos D'Ambrosio (47.20); Gabriele Valente^{[a]}	3:16.03	United States (USA); Austin Carpenter (49.71); Rowan Cox (48.93); Kenneth Barnicle (49.57); Michael Rice (48.85); Luke Danail Vatev^{[a]}	3:17.06
4×200 m freestyle relay	Neutral Athletes B Mikhail Shcherbakov (1:47.28); Grigorii Vekovishchev (1:48.12); Egor Babinich (1:47.51); Andrei Cherepkov (1:47.48); Matvei Nesterov^{[a]}	7:10.39	Japan (JPN); Kazusa Kuroda (1:47.80); Yumeki Kojima (1:48.55); Kazushi Imafuku (1:50.19); Raito Numata (1:45.93)	7:12.47	Italy (ITA); Gabriele Valente (1:49.27); Alberto Ferrazza (1:48.74); Andrea Zanin (1:49.29); Carlos D'Ambrosio (1:45.60); Francesco Pernice^{[a]}	7:12.90
4×100 m medley relay	Japan (JPN); Yumeki Kojima (54.92); Shin Ohashi (58.55); Raito Numata (52.94); Kazusa Kuroda (48.59); Toya Hirata^{[a]}	3:35.00	Great Britain (GBR); Daniel Ransom (55.70); Filip Nowacki (59.23); Dean Fearn (52.44); Jacob Mills (47.65); Max Morgan^{[a]} Gabriel Shepherd^{[a]}	3:35.02	Italy (ITA); Daniele Del Signore (54.65); Gabriele Garzia (1:01.25); Francesco Ceolin (52.69); Carlos D'Ambrosio (47.27); Matteo Venini^{[a]} Daniel D'Agostino^{[a]}	3:35.86

=== Women ===
Event	Gold		Silver		Bronze	
50 m freestyle	Rylee Erisman; United States	24.70	Theodora Taylor; Great Britain	24.72	Jana Pavalić; Croatia	24.85
100 m freestyle	Rylee Erisman; United States	52.79; CR	Lily King; United States	54.19	Theodora Taylor; Great Britain	54.20
200 m freestyle	Yang Peiqi; China	1:56.25; CR	Rylee Erisman; United States	1:56.76	Alessandra Mao; Italy	1:57.00
400 m freestyle	Yang Peiqi; China	4:05.38; CR	Yan Tiaoshan; China	4:05.80	Kennedi Dobson; United States	4:06.66
800 m freestyle	Yang Peiqi; China	8:22.93	Agostina Hein; Argentina	8:26.19	Kseniia Misharina; Neutral Athletes B	8:29.50
1500 m freestyle	Yang Peiqi; China	16:08.37	Kseniia Misharina; Neutral Athletes B	16:12.63	Emma Vittoria Giannelli; Italy	16:15.40
50 m backstroke	Ainsley Trotter; Australia	27.88	Kim Seung-won; South Korea	28.00	Blythe Kinsman; Great Britain	28.04
100 m backstroke	Charlotte Crush; United States	59.52	Daria-Mariuca Silisteanu; Romania	1:00.02; NR	Madison Kryger; Canada	1:00.27
200 m backstroke	Audrey Derivaux; United States	2:06.99; CR	Charlotte Crush; United States	2:07.83	Milana Stepanova; Neutral Athletes B	2:09.99
50 m breaststroke	Rachel McAlpin; United States	30.78	Smiltė Plytnykaitė; Lithuania	31.12	Ralina Giliazova; Neutral Athletes B	31.19
100 m breaststroke	Smiltė Plytnykaitė; Lithuania	1:06.86	Lena Ludwig; Germany	1:07.60	Moon Su-a; South Korea	1:07.86
200 m breaststroke	Moon Su-a; South Korea	2:24.77	Lena Ludwig; Germany	2:26.56	Kaidy Stout; United States	2:26.84
50 m butterfly	Zoe Pedersen; New Zealand	25.63	Mizuki Hirai; Japan	25.66	Martine Damborg; Denmark	25.80
100 m butterfly	Mizuki Hirai; Japan	56.87; CR	Audrey Derivaux; United States	57.74	Gong Zhenqi; China	58.10
200 m butterfly	Audrey Derivaux; United States	2:07.57	Serafima Fokina; Neutral Athletes B	2:07.67	Umi Ishizuka; Japan	2:08.16
200 m individual medley	Audrey Derivaux; United States	2:10.58	Amalie Smith; Great Britain	2:11.07	Shuna Sasaki; Japan	2:11.84
400 m individual medley	Agostina Hein; Argentina	4:34.34; CR, NR	Amalie Smith; Great Britain	4:35.49	Shuna Sasaki; Japan	4:38.94
4×100 m freestyle relay	United States (USA); Rylee Erisman (53.41); Liberty Clark (53.85); Julie Mishler (54.65); Lily King (53.62); Annam Olasewere^{[a]}	3:35.53; WJ	Neutral Athletes B Kira Manokhina (54.51); Mariia Poleshchuk (54.49); Alisa Zakharova (54.45); Milana Stepanova (54.42); Vasilisa Malaeva^{[a]}	3:37.87	China (CHN); Luo Mingyu (55.65); Yan Tiaoshan (55.47); Chen Yizhou (54.75); Yang Peiqi (54.51); Sun Yidan^{[a]} Zhou Yanjun^{[a]}	3:40.38
4×200 m freestyle relay	China (CHN); Yan Tiaoshan (1:57.69); Gong Zhenqi (1:57.91); Luo Mingyu (2:00.45); Yang Peiqi (1:55.54)	7:51.59	United States (USA); Kennedi Dobson (1:57.53); Lily King (1:58.39); Kayla Han (2:00.21); Rylee Erisman (1:56.69); Liberty Clark^{[a]} Brinkleigh Hansen^{[a]}	7:52.82	Italy (ITA); Bianca Nannucci (1:59.67); Lucrezia Domina (1:58.75); Chiara Sama (1:58.72); Alessandra Mao (1:59.72)	7:56.86
4×100 m medley relay	United States (USA); Charlotte Crush (1:00.00); Rachel McAlpin (1:09.16); Audrey Derivaux (57.94); Rylee Erisman (52.75); Julie Mishler^{[a]} Mena Boardman^{[a]} Lily King^{[a]}	3:59.85	China (CHN); Li Jiawei (1:00.55); Wang Yijing (1:09.09); Gong Zhenqi (57.59); Yang Peiqi (54.14); Sun Yidan^{[a]} Zhou Xinyang^{[a]} Chn Yizhou^{[a]}	4:01.37	Neutral Athletes B Milana Stepanova (1:00.27); Viktoriia Tarannikova (1:08.90); Serafima Fokina (59.00); Kira Manokhina (53.44); Daria Zarubenkova^{[a]} Ralina Giliazova^{[a]} Mariia Poleshchuk^{[a]}	4:01.61

=== Mixed ===
Event	Gold		Silver		Bronze	
4×100 m freestyle relay	United States (USA); Michael Rice (49.80); Rowan Cox (49.21); Rylee Erisman (53.11); Lily King (53.91); Luke Danail Vatev^{[a]} Austin Carpenter^{[a]} Liberty Clark^{[a]} Julie Mishler^{[a]}	3:26.03	Great Britain (GBR); Gabriel Shepherd (49.72); Jacob Mills (47.76); Skye Carter (54.63); Theodora Taylor (54.06)	3:26.17	Italy (ITA); Gabriele Valente (49.69); Carlos D'Ambrosio (47.40); Ludovica di Maria (55.01); Alessandra Mao (54.69); Francesco Ceolin^{[a]} Chiara Sama^{[a]}	3:26.79
4×100 m medley relay	Japan (JPN); Yumeki Kojima (54.90); Shin Ohashi (58.52); Mizuki Hirai (56.68); Yui Fukuoka (55.47); Toya Hirata^{[a]}	3:45.57	United States (USA); Gavin Keogh (54.07); Gabe Nunziata (1:00.80); Charlotte Crush (58.20); Rylee Erisman (53.05); Collin Holgerson^{[a]} Andrew Eubanks^{[a]} Mena Boardman^{[a]} Liberty Clark^{[a]}	3:46.12	Great Britain (GBR); Blythe Kinsman (1:01.15); Filip Nowacki (58.83); Dean Fearn (52.43); Theodora Taylor (54.02); Max Morgan^{[a]} Jacob Mills^{[a]}	3:46.43

== Records ==
The following world junior and championship records were set during the competition:

=== World junior records ===
Date	Round	Event	Time	Name	Nation
19 August	Final	Men's 4 × 100 metre freestyle relay	3:15.38	Mikhail Shcherbakov (49.13); Roman Zhidkov (48.37); Egor Proshin (48.98); Georgii Zlotnikov (48.90)	Neutral Athletes B
21 August	Semifinal 2	Men's 50 metre freestyle	=21.75	Nikita Sheremet	Ukraine
23 August	Heat 9	Men's 50 metre breaststroke	26.95	Jan Malte Gräfe	Germany
23 August	Final	Women's 4 × 100 metre freestyle relay	3:35.53	Rylee Erisman (53.41); Liberty Clark (53.85); Julie Mishler (54.65); Lily King (53.62)	United States

=== Championship records ===
Date	Round	Event	Time	Name	Nation
19 August	Final	Women's 400 metre individual medley	4:34.34	Agostina Hein	Argentina
20 August	Heat 11	Women's 100 metre freestyle	53.17	Rylee Erisman	United States
20 August	Final	Men's 200 metre freestyle	1:45.15	Carlos D'Ambrosio	Italy
20 August	Semifinal 2	Women's 100 metre freestyle	53.09	Rylee Erisman	United States
20 August	Final	Men's 200 metre individual medley	1:57.25	Mikhail Shcherbakov	Neutral Athletes B
21 August	Final	Women's 200 metre backstroke	2:06.99	Audrey Derivaux	United States
21 August	Final	Women's 100 metre freestyle	52.79	Rylee Erisman	United States
22 August	Semifinal 1	Women's 50 metre backstroke	27.77	Kim Seung-won	South Korea
22 August	Final	Men's 200 metre breaststroke	2:07.32	Filip Nowacki	Great Britain
22 August	Final	Women's 400 metre freestyle	4:05.38	Yang Peiqi	China
23 August	Semifinal 2	Women's 100 metre butterfly	57.02	Mizuki Hirai	Japan
24 August	Final	Women's 100 metre butterfly	56.87	Mizuki Hirai	Japan
24 August	Final	Women's 200 metre freestyle	1:56.25	Yang Peiqi	China

== Participating countries ==
Swimmers from the following 126 countries competed at the Championships.

- Albania
- Angola
- Antigua and Barbuda
- Argentina
- Armenia
- Aruba
- Australia
- Austria
- Azerbaijan
- Bahamas
- Bahrain
- Barbados
- Bolivia (7)
- Bosnia and Herzegovina (3)
- Botswana (3)
- Brazil (16)
- Brunei (1)
- Bulgaria (5)
- Cambodia (3)
- Canada (18)
- Cape Verde (1)
- Central African Republic (2)
- Chile (4)
- China (10)
- Chinese Taipei (1)
- Colombia (6)
- Cook Islands (2)
- Costa Rica (8)
- Croatia (8)
- Cuba (2)
- Curaçao (3)
- Czech Republic (10)
- Denmark (2)
- Djibouti (1)
- Dominican Republic (9)
- Ecuador (2)
- Egypt (2)
- Estonia (4)
- Ethiopia (2)
- Fiji (4)
- Finland (2)
- France (12)
- Germany (10)
- Ghana
- Great Britain
- Greece
- Grenada
- Guatemala (7)
- Honduras (10)
- Hong Kong (5)
- Hungary (30)
- India (7)
- Indonesia (3)
- Iran (3)
- Ireland (3)
- Israel (5)
- Italy (17)
- Jamaica (8)
- Japan (9)
- Jordan (4)
- Kazakhstan (2)
- Kenya (5)
- Kosovo (8)
- Kyrgyzstan (3)
- Latvia (3)
- Lebanon (6)
- Lithuania (6)
- Madagascar (9)
- Malaysia (4)
- Malawi (3)
- Maldives (3)
- Malta (6)
- Mexico (20)
- Moldova (1)
- Mongolia (8)
- Namibia (4)
- Nepal (8)
- New Zealand (7)
- Nigeria (4)
- North Korea (1)
- North Macedonia (2)
- Pakistan (9)
- Palestine (2)
- Panama (3)
- Paraguay (12)
- Peru
- Philippines
- Poland
- Portugal
- Puerto Rico
- Romania
- Saint Lucia
- Saint Vincent and the Grenadines
- Senegal
- Serbia
- Seychelles
- Sierra Leone
- Singapore
- Slovakia
- Slovenia
- South Africa
- South Korea
- Spain
- Sri Lanka
- Sudan
- Suriname
- Sweden
- Syria
- Tajikistan
- Tanzania
- Timor-Leste
- Tunisia
- Turkey
- United Arab Emirates
- Uganda
- Ukraine
- Uruguay
- United States
- United States Virgin Islands
- Uzbekistan
- Venezuela
- Vietnam
- Zambia
- Zimbabwe
