= Dean Fearn =

British swimmer

Personal information
- Nationality: Great Britain
- Born: January 12, 2008 (age 18) Stonehaven, Scotland

Sport
- Sport: Swimming
- Strokes: Butterfly, Backstroke
- Club: Aberdeen Dolphins
- Coach: Laura Bowie
Medal record
Representing Great Britain
World Junior Championships
Gold medal – first place	2025 Otopeni	50 m butterfly
Silver medal – second place	2025 Otopeni	4×100 m medley
Bronze medal – third place	2025 Otopeni	100 m butterfly
Bronze medal – third place	2025 Otopeni	4×100 m mixed medley
European Junior Championships
Gold medal – first place	2025 Samorin	50 m butterfly
Gold medal – first place	2025 Samorin	4×100 m medley
Gold medal – first place	2024 Vilnius	4×100 m mixed medley
Gold medal – first place	2025 Samorin	4×100 m mixed medley
Silver medal – second place	2025 Samorin	100 m butterfly
Bronze medal – third place	2024 vilnius	4×100 m medley
Bronze medal – third place	2026 Munich	50 m butterfly
Bronze medal – third place	2026 Munich	4×100 freestyle
Bronze medal – third place	2026 Munich	4×100 medley
European Youth Olympic Festival
Silver medal – second place	2023 Maribor	4x100 m medley
Bronze medal – third place	2023 Maribor	4×100 m mixed medley
Representing Scotland
Commonwealth Youth Games
Gold medal – first place	2023 Trinbago	50 m butterfly

Dean Fearn (born 12 January 2008) is a Scottish competitive swimmer representing Great Britain and Scotland internationally, and specializing in butterfly and backstroke. He is a World Junior champion in the 50 m butterfly and a multi-medalist at the 2025 World Junior and 2024 and 2025 European Junior Championships.

== Career ==
Fearn trains with the Aberdeen Dolphins under coach Laura Bowie.

In 2023, he represented Great Britain at the European Youth Olympic Festival in Maribor, Slovenia, and later won gold in the 50 m butterfly at the 2023 Commonwealth Youth Games in Trinidad and Tobago.

At the 2024 British Swimming Championships, Fearn set three Scottish junior records and achieved European Junior qualification standards.

== Personal bests ==
Long course (50 m pool)
Event	Time	Date	Location
50 m butterfly	23.29	6 July 2025	Samorin, Slovakia
100 m butterfly	52.64	4 July 2025	Samorin, Slovakia
100 m backstroke	54.82	April 2025	British Championships

== Personal life ==
Fearn attends Lathallan School in Scotland.
