= Mizuki Hirai =

Japanese swimmer (born 2007)

Personal information
- Nationality: Japanese
- Born: 7 March 2007 (age 19)

Sport
- Sport: Swimming

Mizuki Hirai (born 7 March 2007) is a Japanese swimmer. She placed seventh in the women's 100 metre butterfly at the 2024 Summer Olympics held in Paris, France.
