= European Junior Swimming Championships =

Annual swimming competition

- Status: Active
- Genre: Sporting event
- Date: Mid-year
- Begins: 1967
- Frequency: Annual
- Most recent: Šamorín 2025
- Previous event: Vilnius 2024
- Next event: Munich 2026
- Participants: 52 Federations
- Organiser: LEN
- Website: len.eu

The European Junior Swimming Championships (50 m) is an annual swimming competition for European swimmers organized by the Ligue Européenne de Natation and held over five days. Up until 2015, the competitor age for girls was 15 to 16 years, while for boys it was 17 to 18 years. Since 2016, girls between the ages of 14 to 17 years and boys aged between 15 to 18 years are eligible to compete.

== History ==
Until 1989 the European Junior Diving Championships was held together with European Junior Swimming Championships, and even since then has sometimes been co-hosted with the European Junior Swimming Championships, for example in Palma de Mallorca in 2006.

A stand-alone European Junior Swimming Championships was not held in 2015; instead the junior swimming events formed the bulk aquatics program at the 2015 European Games. European Games champions and medalists for that year were simultaneously treated as champions and medalists of the European Junior Swimming Championships for the purposes of 2015.

== Editions ==
| # | Year | Host city | Country | Date | Results |
|---|---|---|---|---|---|
| 1 | 1967 | Linköping | Sweden | 13–15 August | |
| 2 | 1969 | Vienna | Austria | 15–17 August | |
| 3 | 1971 | Rotterdam | Netherlands | 12–15 August | |
| 4 | 1973 | Leeds | Great Britain | 8–11 August | |
| 5 | 1975 | Geneva | Switzerland | 7–10 August | |
| 6 | 1976 | Oslo | Norway | 5–8 August | |
| 7 | 1978 | Florence | Italy | 27–30 July | |
| 8 | 1980 | Skövde | Sweden | 7–10 August | |
| 9 | 1982 | Innsbruck | Austria | 26–29 August | |
| 10 | 1983 | Mulhouse | France | 5–8 August | |
| 11 | 1984 | Luxembourg City | Luxembourg | 26–29 July | |
| 12 | 1985 | Geneva | Switzerland | 25–28 July | |
| 13 | 1986 | West Berlin | — | 25–27 July | |
| 14 | 1987 | Rome | Italy | 23–26 July | |
| 15 | 1988 | Amersfoort | Netherlands | 28–31 July | |
| 16 | 1989 | Leeds | Great Britain | 28–30 July | |
| 17 | 1990 | Dunkirk | France | 26–29 July | |
| 18 | 1991 | Antwerp | Belgium | 1–4 August | |
| 19 | 1992 | Leeds | Great Britain | 13–16 August | |
| 20 | 1993 | Istanbul | Turkey | 8–11 July | |
| 21 | 1994 | Pardubice | Czech Republic | 4–7 August | |
| 22 | 1995 | Geneva | Switzerland | 19–22 July | |
| 23 | 1996 | Copenhagen | Denmark | 7–10 August | |
| 24 | 1997 | Glasgow | Great Britain | 31 July – 3 August | |
| 25 | 1998 | Antwerp | Belgium | 30 July – 2 August | |
| 26 | 1999 | Moscow | Russia | 14–17 July | |
| 27 | 2000 | Dunkirk | France | 27–30 July | |
| 28 | 2001 | Malta | Malta | 5–8 July | |
| 29 | 2002 | Linz | Austria | 11–14 July | |
| 30 | 2003 | Glasgow | Great Britain | 31 July – 3 August | |
| 31 | 2004 | Lisbon | Portugal | 15–18 July | |
| 32 | 2005 | Budapest | Hungary | 14–17 July | |
| 33 | 2006 | Palma de Mallorca | Spain | 6–9 July | |
| 34 | 2007 | Antwerp | Belgium | 18–22 July | |
| 35 | 2008 | Belgrade | Serbia | 30 July – 3 August | |
| 36 | 2009 | Prague | Czech Republic | 8–12 July | |
| 37 | 2010 | Helsinki | Finland | 14–18 July | |
| 38 | 2011 | Belgrade | Serbia | 6–10 July | |
| 39 | 2012 | Antwerp | Belgium | 4–8 July | |
| 40 | 2013 | Poznań | Poland | 10–14 July | |
| 41 | 2014 | Dordrecht | Netherlands | 9–13 July | |
| 42 | 2015* | Baku | Azerbaijan | 23–27 June | - |
| 43 | 2016 | Hódmezővásárhely | Hungary | 6–10 July | |
| 44 | 2017 | Netanya | Israel | 28 June – 2 July | |
| 45 | 2018 | Helsinki | Finland | 4–8 July | |
| 46 | 2019 | Kazan | Russia | 3–7 July | |
| - | 2020 | Aberdeen | Great Britain | ~~8–12 July~~ Cancelled | |
| 47 | 2021 | Rome | Italy | 6–11 July | |
| 48 | 2022 | Otopeni | Romania | 5–10 July | |
| 49 | 2023 | Belgrade | Serbia | 4–9 July | |
| 50 | 2024 | Vilnius | Lithuania | 2–7 July | |
| 51 | 2025 | Šamorín | Slovakia | 1–6 July | |
| 52 | 2026 | Munich | Germany | 7–12 July | |

- As the aquatics program of the 2015 European Games.

== Medalist ==
=== Artistic swimming (to 2025) ===
| Rank | Nation | Gold | Silver | Bronze | Total |
|---|---|---|---|---|---|
| 1 | Russia | 86 | 1 | 0 | 87 |
| 2 | Spain | 22 | 37 | 40 | 99 |
| 3 | Soviet Union | 7 | 2 | 4 | 13 |
| 4 | Individual Neutral Athletes | 6 | 1 | 1 | 8 |
| 5 | Ukraine | 5 | 44 | 20 | 69 |
| 6 | France | 5 | 15 | 12 | 32 |
| 7 | Germany | 5 | 1 | 1 | 7 |
| 8 | Italy | 4 | 30 | 32 | 66 |
| 9 | Netherlands | 3 | 1 | 5 | 9 |
| 10 | Great Britain | 2 | 8 | 9 | 19 |
| 11 | Greece | 2 | 6 | 22 | 30 |
| 12 | Belarus | 2 | 1 | 3 | 6 |
| 13 | Austria | 2 | 1 | 1 | 4 |
| 14 | CIS | 2 | 1 | 0 | 3 |
| 15 | Israel | 1 | 0 | 2 | 3 |
| 16 | Switzerland | 0 | 4 | 0 | 4 |
| 17 | Croatia | 0 | 1 | 0 | 1 |
| 18 | Poland | 0 | 0 | 1 | 1 |
| Totals (18 entries) | | 154 | 154 | 153 | 461 |

=== Diving (1967–2025) ===
| Rank | Nation | Gold | Silver | Bronze | Total |
|---|---|---|---|---|---|
| 1 | Russia | 154 | 116 | 82 | 352 |
| 2 | Ukraine | 91 | 81 | 66 | 238 |
| 3 | Germany | 77 | 84 | 92 | 253 |
| 4 | Italy | 53 | 61 | 58 | 172 |
| 5 | Great Britain | 40 | 59 | 75 | 174 |
| 6 | Soviet Union | 38 | 27 | 28 | 93 |
| 7 | East Germany | 22 | 34 | 24 | 80 |
| 8 | Sweden | 14 | 6 | 14 | 34 |
| 9 | Spain | 10 | 8 | 14 | 32 |
| 10 | Romania | 6 | 12 | 17 | 35 |
| 11 | Belarus | 6 | 6 | 8 | 20 |
| 12 | Poland | 5 | 9 | 5 | 19 |
| 13 | Individual Neutral Athletes | 5 | 6 | 6 | 17 |
| 14 | Austria | 5 | 4 | 3 | 12 |
| 15 | Hungary | 4 | 3 | 7 | 14 |
| 16 | Switzerland | 3 | 10 | 4 | 17 |
| 17 | Greece | 2 | 2 | 10 | 14 |
| 18 | France | 2 | 2 | 6 | 10 |
| 19 | Netherlands | 2 | 1 | 2 | 5 |
| 20 | Croatia | 1 | 1 | 5 | 7 |
| 21 | Czechoslovakia | 1 | 0 | 2 | 3 |
| 22 | Canada | 1 | 0 | 0 | 1 |
| 23 | Finland | 0 | 5 | 4 | 9 |
| 24 | Norway | 0 | 3 | 5 | 8 |
| 25 | Lithuania | 0 | 1 | 1 | 2 |
| 26 | Portugal | 0 | 1 | 0 | 1 |
| 27 | Armenia | 0 | 0 | 1 | 1 |
| 27 | Denmark | 0 | 0 | 1 | 1 |
| 27 | Ireland | 0 | 0 | 1 | 1 |
| Totals (29 entries) | | 542 | 542 | 541 | 1,625 |

=== Open water swimming (to 2025) ===
| Rank | Nation | Gold | Silver | Bronze | Total |
|---|---|---|---|---|---|
| 1 | France | 30 | 5 | 11 | 46 |
| 2 | Hungary | 20 | 21 | 12 | 53 |
| 3 | Germany | 15 | 21 | 19 | 55 |
| 4 | Italy | 12 | 23 | 32 | 67 |
| 5 | Russia | 9 | 14 | 15 | 38 |
| 6 | Great Britain | 8 | 6 | 2 | 16 |
| 7 | Spain | 6 | 11 | 9 | 26 |
| 8 | Turkey | 4 | 3 | 4 | 11 |
| 9 | Greece | 4 | 2 | 3 | 9 |
| 10 | Poland | 2 | 3 | 2 | 7 |
| 11 | Netherlands | 1 | 1 | 1 | 3 |
| 12 | Croatia | 1 | 1 | 0 | 2 |
| 13 | Portugal | 1 | 0 | 1 | 2 |
| 14 | Slovenia | 0 | 2 | 1 | 3 |
| 15 | Individual Neutral Athletes | 0 | 1 | 2 | 3 |
| Totals (15 entries) | | 113 | 114 | 114 | 341 |

=== Swimming (1967–2025) ===
Exclude Swimming at the 2015 European Games.

| Rank | Nation | Gold | Silver | Bronze | Total |
|---|---|---|---|---|---|
| 1 | Russia | 235 | 175 | 127 | 537 |
| 2 | Germany | 201 | 212 | 219 | 632 |
| 3 | Hungary | 177 | 146 | 120 | 443 |
| 4 | East Germany | 176 | 115 | 107 | 398 |
| 5 | Italy | 156 | 176 | 176 | 508 |
| 6 | Great Britain | 109 | 158 | 163 | 430 |
| 7 | Soviet Union | 97 | 82 | 55 | 234 |
| 8 | Poland | 57 | 53 | 83 | 193 |
| 9 | France | 51 | 85 | 94 | 230 |
| 10 | Ukraine | 49 | 44 | 42 | 135 |
| 11 | Spain | 48 | 52 | 42 | 142 |
| 12 | Romania | 44 | 47 | 45 | 136 |
| 13 | Netherlands | 36 | 53 | 51 | 140 |
| 14 | Turkey | 26 | 17 | 27 | 70 |
| 15 | Sweden | 24 | 49 | 71 | 144 |
| 16 | Denmark | 22 | 24 | 15 | 61 |
| 17 | Lithuania | 16 | 9 | 9 | 34 |
| 18 | Greece | 15 | 14 | 33 | 62 |
| 19 | Croatia | 13 | 15 | 13 | 41 |
| 20 | Czech Republic | 13 | 14 | 17 | 44 |
| 21 | Austria | 12 | 6 | 12 | 30 |
| 22 | Bulgaria | 9 | 11 | 5 | 25 |
| 23 | Slovenia | 9 | 9 | 15 | 33 |
| 24 | Belarus | 9 | 9 | 12 | 30 |
| 25 | Ireland | 9 | 6 | 8 | 23 |
| 26 | Belgium | 8 | 17 | 19 | 44 |
| 27 | Czechoslovakia | 8 | 10 | 7 | 25 |
| 28 | Serbia | 8 | 6 | 5 | 19 |
| 29 | Estonia | 7 | 5 | 6 | 18 |
| 30 | Bosnia and Herzegovina | 6 | 4 | 1 | 11 |
| 31 | Finland | 5 | 12 | 12 | 29 |
| 32 | Individual Neutral Athletes | 5 | 4 | 4 | 13 |
| 33 | Israel | 4 | 11 | 16 | 31 |
| 34 | Portugal | 4 | 9 | 11 | 24 |
| 35 | Switzerland | 4 | 3 | 9 | 16 |
| 36 | Yugoslavia | 3 | 7 | 4 | 14 |
| 37 | Faroe Islands | 3 | 0 | 0 | 3 |
| 38 | Moldova | 2 | 3 | 3 | 8 |
| 39 | Serbia and Montenegro | 2 | 3 | 0 | 5 |
| 40 | Luxembourg | 2 | 1 | 1 | 4 |
| 41 | Iceland | 1 | 5 | 1 | 7 |
| 42 | North Macedonia | 1 | 4 | 2 | 7 |
| 43 | Slovakia | 1 | 2 | 5 | 8 |
| 44 | Norway | 0 | 5 | 7 | 12 |
| 45 | Latvia | 0 | 1 | 2 | 3 |
| 46 | Cyprus | 0 | 0 | 2 | 2 |
| 47 | Azerbaijan | 0 | 0 | 1 | 1 |
| 47 | Georgia | 0 | 0 | 1 | 1 |
| Totals (48 entries) | | 1,687 | 1,693 | 1,680 | 5,060 |

=== Water polo (to 2023) ===
| Rank | Nation | Gold | Silver | Bronze | Total |
|---|---|---|---|---|---|
| 1 | Hungary | 5 | 5 | 6 | 16 |
| 2 | Serbia | 4 | 1 | 2 | 7 |
| 3 | Soviet Union | 3 | 3 | 2 | 8 |
| 4 | Italy | 3 | 1 | 2 | 6 |
| 5 | Serbia and Montenegro | 3 | 1 | 0 | 4 |
| 6 | Greece | 2 | 1 | 2 | 5 |
| 7 | Spain | 1 | 7 | 7 | 15 |
| 8 | Croatia | 1 | 2 | 2 | 5 |
| 9 | Montenegro | 1 | 2 | 0 | 3 |
| 10 | Germany | 1 | 0 | 2 | 3 |
| 11 | Yugoslavia | 1 | 0 | 0 | 1 |
| 12 | Czechoslovakia | 0 | 1 | 0 | 1 |
| 12 | Romania | 0 | 1 | 0 | 1 |
| Totals (13 entries) | | 25 | 25 | 25 | 75 |

== Championships records ==
All records were set in finals unless noted otherwise. All times are swum in a long-course (50m) pool.

=== Men ===
| Event | Time | | Name | Nationality | Date | Meet | Location | Ref |
|---|---|---|---|---|---|---|---|---|
| 50m freestyle | 21.83 | | Artem Selin | Germany | 7 July 2019 | 2019 Championships | Kazan, Russia | |
| 100m freestyle | 47.30 | | David Popovici | Romania | 8 July 2021 | 2021 Championships | Rome, Italy | |
| 200m freestyle | 1:45.26 | sf | David Popovici | Romania | 9 July 2021 | 2021 Championships | Rome, Italy | |
| 400m freestyle | 3:44.31 | | Petar Mitsin | Bulgaria | 9 July 2023 | 2023 Championships | Belgrade, Serbia | |
| 800m freestyle | 7:46.01 | | Kuzey Tunçelli | Turkey | 5 July 2025 | 2025 Championships | Šamorín, Slovakia | |
| 1500m freestyle | 14:41.89 | | Kuzey Tunçelli | Turkey | 4 July 2024 | 2024 Championships | Vilnius, Lithuania | |
| 50m backstroke | 24.52 | | Kliment Kolesnikov | Russia | 7 July 2018 | 2018 Championships | Helsinki, Finland | |
| 100m backstroke | 52.91 | | Ksawery Masiuk | Poland | 10 July 2022 | 2022 Championships | Otopeni, Romania | |
| 200m backstroke | 1:55.79 | | Oleksandr Zheltyakov | Ukraine | 7 July 2023 | 2023 Championships | Belgrade, Serbia | |
| 50m breaststroke | 27.18 | h, = | Jan Foltyn | Czech Republic | 7 July 2026 | 2026 Championships | Munich, Germany | |
| 50m breaststroke | 27.18 | sf, = | Max Morgan | Great Britain | 7 July 2026 | 2026 Championships | Munich, Germany | |
| 100m breaststroke | 59.23 | | Nicolò Martinenghi | Italy | 2 July 2017 | 2017 Championships | Netanya, Israel | |
| 200m breaststroke | 2:08.32 | | Filip Nowacki | Great Britain | 4 July 2025 | 2025 Championships | Šamorín, Slovakia | |
| 50m butterfly | 23.29 | | Dean Fearn | Great Britain | 6 July 2025 | 2025 Championships | Šamorín, Slovakia | |
| 100m butterfly | 51.35 | | Egor Kuimov | Russia | 2 July 2017 | 2017 Championships | Netanya, Israel | |
| 200m butterfly | 1:53.79 | | Kristóf Milák | Hungary | 30 June 2017 | 2017 Championships | Netanya, Israel | |
| 200m individual medley | 1:57.07 | sf | Mikhail Shcherbakov | Neutral Individual Athletes | 8 July 2026 | 2026 Championships | Munich, Germany | |
| 400m individual medley | 4:14.37 | | Robert Badea | Romania | 5 July 2024 | 2024 Championships | Vilnius, Lithuania | |
| 4×100m freestyle relay | 3:12.75 | | Bogdan Toropkin (49.21); Egor Proshin (47.58); Matvei Miliaev (48.36); Mikhail Shcherbakov (47.60) | Neutral Individual Athletes | 7 July 2026 | 2026 Championships | Munich, Germany | |
| 4×200m freestyle relay | 7:09.16 | | Bogdan Toropkin (1:47.86); Mikhail Shcherbakov (1:47.42); Savelii Vishniakov (1:48.16); Grigorii Vekovishchev (1:45.72) | Neutral Individual Athletes | 11 July 2026 | 2026 Championships | Munich, Germany | |
| 4×100m medley relay | 3:35.24 | | Thomas Ceccon (54.72); Nicolò Martinenghi (58.93); Federico Burdisso (52.69); Davide Nardini (48.90) | Italy | 2 July 2017 | 2017 Championships | Netanya, Israel | |

Legend: # – Record awaiting ratification by LEN; WR – World record; ER – European record; e – equalled existing record;
Records not set in finals: h – heat; sf – semifinal; r – relay 1st leg; rh – relay heat 1st leg; b – B final; † – en route to final mark; so – swim-off; tt – time trial

=== Women ===
| Event | Time | | Name | Nationality | Date | Meet | Location | Ref |
|---|---|---|---|---|---|---|---|---|
| 50m freestyle | 24.67 | h | Sara Curtis | Italy | 3 July 2024 | 2024 Championships | Vilnius, Lithuania | |
| 100m freestyle | 53.97 | | Marrit Steenbergen | Netherlands | 24 June 2015 | 2015 Championships | Baku, Azerbaijan | |
| 200m freestyle | 1:57.51 | | Isabel Gose | Germany | 6 July 2019 | 2019 Championships | Kazan, Russia | |
| 400m freestyle | 4:05.54 | | Kseniia Misharina | Neutral Individual Athletes | 12 July 2026 | 2026 Championships | Munich, Germany | |
| 800m freestyle | 8:21.91 | | Merve Tuncel | Turkey | 7 July 2021 | 2021 Championships | Rome, Italy | |
| 1500m freestyle | 15:55.23 | | Merve Tuncel | Turkey | 10 July 2021 | 2021 Championships | Rome, Italy | |
| 50m backstroke | 27.74 | | Mary-Ambre Moluh | France | 6 July 2022 | 2022 Championships | Otopeni, Romania | |
| 100m backstroke | 59.62 | | Polina Egorova | Russia | 2 July 2017 | 2017 Championships | Netanya, Israel | |
| 200m backstroke | 2:08.97 | | Polina Egorova | Russia | 29 June 2017 | 2017 Championships | Netanya, Israel | |
| 50m breaststroke | 29.75 | h | Benedetta Pilato | Italy | 6 July 2021 | 2021 Championships | Rome, Italy | |
| 100m breaststroke | 1:05.48 | | Rūta Meilutytė | Lithuania | 14 July 2013 | 2013 Championships | Poznań, Poland | |
| 200m breaststroke | 2:21.07 | sf | Evgenia Chikunova | Russia | 4 July 2019 | 2019 Championships | Kazan, Russia | |
| 50m butterfly | 26.03 | sf | Andréanne Bourseul | France | 11 July 2026 | 2026 Championships | Munich, Germany | |
| 100m butterfly | 56.95 | | Lana Pudar | Bosnia and Herzegovina | 6 July 2023 | 2023 Championships | Belgrade, Serbia | |
| 200m butterfly | 2:06.26 | | Lana Pudar | Bosnia and Herzegovina | 8 July 2023 | 2023 Championships | Belgrade, Serbia | |
| 200m individual medley | 2:12.41 | | Leah Schlosshan | Great Britain | 9 July 2023 | 2023 Championships | Belgrade, Serbia | |
| 400m individual medley | 4:35.32 | | Amalie Smith | Great Britain | 7 July 2026 | 2026 Championships | Munich, Germany | |
| 4×100m freestyle relay | 3:37.35 | | Emma Wood (55.23); Theodora Taylor (53.42); Hannah Capron (54.53); Amalie Smith (54.17) | Great Britain | 7 July 2026 | 2026 Championships | Munich, Germany | |
| 4×200m freestyle relay | 7:56.06 | | Lucrezia Domina (1:59.69); Bianca Nannucci (1:59.65); Chiara Sama (1:59.19); Alessandra Mao (1:57.53) | Italy | 3 July 2025 | 2025 Championships | Šamorín, Slovakia | |
| 4×100m medley relay | 4:01.83 | = | Daria Vaskina (1:00.50); Anastasia Makarova (1:07.86); Aleksandra Sabitova (58.27); Ekaterina Nikonova (55.20) | Russia | 5 July 2019 | 2019 Championships | Kazan, Russia | |
| 4×100m medley relay | 4:01.83 | = | Varvara Filippova (1:01.27); Sofia Anufrieva (1:08.47); Serafima Fokina (58.83); Kira Manokhina (53.26) | Neutral Individual Athletes | 12 July 2026 | 2026 Championships | Munich, Germany | |

Legend: # – Record awaiting ratification by LEN; WR – World record; ER – European record; e – equalled existing record;
Records not set in finals: h – heat; sf – semifinal; r – relay 1st leg; rh – relay heat 1st leg; b – B final; † – en route to final mark; so – swim-off; tt – time trial

=== Mixed ===
| Event | Time | Name | Nationality | Date | Meet | Location | Ref |
|---|---|---|---|---|---|---|---|
| 4×100 m freestyle relay | 3:23.96 | Egor Proshin (47.94); Mikhail Shcherbakov (48.37); Kseniia Sorokina (53.75); Kira Manokhina (53.90) | Neutral Individual Athletes | 8 July 2026 | 2026 Championships | Munich, Germany | |
| 4×100 m medley relay | 3:47.07 | Blythe Kinsman (1:00.64); Filip Nowacki (59.25); Dean Fearn (52.44); Theodora Taylor (54.74) | Great Britain | 4 July 2025 | 2025 Championships | Šamorín, Slovakia | |

Legend: # – Record awaiting ratification by LEN; WR – World record; ER – European record; e – equalled existing record;
Records not set in finals: h – heat; sf – semifinal; r – relay 1st leg; rh – relay heat 1st leg; b – B final; † – en route to final mark; so – swim-off; tt – time trial

== See also ==
- FINA World Junior Swimming Championships
