= Boxing at the 1996 Summer Olympics – Lightweight =

Boxing competitions

Lightweight boxing at the Games of the XXVI Olympiad
- Venue: Alexander Memorial Coliseum
- Dates: 21 July – 3 August
- Competitors: 31 from 31 nations

Medalists
1st place, gold medalist(s)		Hocine Soltani	Algeria
2nd place, silver medalist(s)		Tontcho Tontchev	Bulgaria
3rd place, bronze medalist(s)		Terrance Cauthen	United States
3rd place, bronze medalist(s)		Leonard Doroftei	Romania

The Lightweight class in the boxing at the 1996 Summer Olympics competition was the fifth-lightest class at the 1996 Summer Olympics in Atlanta, Georgia. The weight class was open for boxers weighing more than 60 kilograms. The competition at the Alexander Memorial Coliseum started on 20 July 1996 and ended on 4 August, 1996.

== Medalists ==
Gold	Hocine Soltani; Algeria
Silver	Tontcho Tontchev; Bulgaria
Bronze	Terrance Cauthen; United States
Bronze	Leonard Doroftei; Romania

== Results ==
Round of 32
Francisco Martínez (MEX)	1
Michael Strange (CAN)	15
Denis Zimba (ZAM)	RCS 2
Sergey Ostroshapkin (BLR)	(3:00)
Octavian Țîcu (MDA)	(1:40)
Tontcho Tontchev (BUL)	RSCH 2
Idrissa Kabore (BUR)	6
Jaroslav Konecny (CZE)	16
Irvin Buhlalu (RSA)	5
Phongsit Veangviseth (THA)	21
Tümentsetsegiin Üitümen (MGL)	7
Miguel Mojica (DOM)	1
Mahammatkodir Abdoollayev (UZB)	6
Terrance Cauthen (USA)	18
George Maina (KEN)	(2:59)
Shin Eun-Chul (KOR)	RSC-3
Franco Agentho (UGA)	8
Fabrizio Nieva (ARG)	12
Hocine Soltani (ALG)	14
Vahdettin İşsever (TUR)	2
Henry Kunsi (PNG)	11
Agnaldo Nunes (BRA)	TB 11
Christian Giantomassi (ITA)	11
Sergey Kopenkin (KGZ)	12 (5)
Julio Mboumba (GAB)	(1:46)
Leonard Doroftei (ROM)	RSC-2
Romeo Brin (PHI)	13
Julio Gonzalez Valladares (CUB)	24
Koba Gogoladze (GEO)	17
Ri Chol (PRK)	9

Round of 16
Mekhak Ghazaryan (ARM)	7
Michael Strange (CAN)	16
Dennis Zimba (ZAM)	9
Tontcho Tontchev (BUL)	17
Jaroslav Konecny (CZE)	6
Pongsith Wiangwiset (THA)	20
Tumentsetseg Uitumen (MGL)	9
Terrance Cauthen (USA)	10
Shin Eun-Chul (KOR)	27
Fabrizio Nieva (ARG)	11
Hocine Soltani (ALG)	11
Agnaldo Nunes (BRA)	1
Sergey Kopenkin (KGZ)	1
Leonard Doroftei (ROM)	10
Julio Gonzalez Valladares (CUB)	9
Koba Gogoladze (GEO)	14

Quarterfinals
Michael Strange (CAN)	10
Tontcho Tontchev (BUL)	16
Pongsith Wiangwiset (THA)	10
Terrance Cauthen (USA)	14
Shin Eun-Chul (KOR)	10
Hocine Soltani (ALG)	16
Leonard Doroftei (ROM)	17
Koba Gogoladze (GEO)	8

Semifinals
Tontcho Tontchev (BUL)	15
Terrance Cauthen (USA)	12
Hocine Soltani (ALG)	9
Leonard Doroftei (ROM)	6

Final
Tontcho Tontchev (BUL)	3
Hocine Soltani (ALG)	TB 3
