= Swimming at the 1996 Summer Olympics – Women's 4 × 200 metre freestyle relay =

Women's 4 × 200 metre freestyle relay at the Games of the XXVI Olympiad
- Venue: Georgia Tech Aquatic Center
- Date: July 25, 1996 (heats & final)
- Competitors: 94 from 21 nations
- Teams: 21
- Winning time: 7:59.87 OR

Medalists
1st place, gold medalist(s)		Trina Jackson, Cristina Teuscher, Sheila Taormina, Jenny Thompson, Lisa Jacob*, Annette Salmeen*, Ashley Whitney*	United States
2nd place, silver medalist(s)		Franziska van Almsick, Kerstin Kielgaß, Anke Scholz, Dagmar Hase, Meike Freitag*, Simone Osygus*	Germany
3rd place, bronze medalist(s)		Julia Greville, Nicole Stevenson, Emma Johnson, Susie O'Neill, Lise Mackie*; *Indicates the swimmer only competed in the preliminary heats.	Australia

The women's 4 × 200 metre freestyle relay event at the 1996 Summer Olympics took place on 25 July at the Georgia Tech Aquatic Center in Atlanta, United States. This event was officially included to the women's swimming program for the first time in Olympic history.

== Records ==
Prior to this competition, the existing world and Olympic records were as follows.

World record	East Germany (GDR); Manuela Stellmach (2:00.23); Astrid Strauss (1:58.90); Anke Möhring (1:58.73); Heike Friedrich (1:57.61)	7:55.47	Strasbourg, France	18 August 1987
Olympic record	Inaugural event	—	—	—

The following new world and Olympic records were set during this competition.

Date	Event	Name	Nationality	Time	Record
25 July	Heat 2	Lisa Jacob (2:01.31); Ashley Whitney (2:01.77); Sheila Taormina (2:00.57); Annette Salmeen (2:01.34)	United States	8:04.99	OR
25 July	Final	Trina Jackson (1:59.71); Cristina Teuscher (1:58.86); Sheila Taormina (2:01.29); Jenny Thompson (2:00.01)	United States	7:59.87	OR

== Results ==
=== Heats ===
Rule: The eight fastest teams advance to the final (Q).

Rank	Heat	Lane	Nation	Swimmers	Time	Notes
1	2	4	United States	Lisa Jacob (2:01.31); Ashley Whitney (2:01.77); Sheila Taormina (2:00.57); Annette Salmeen (2:01.34)	8:04.99	Q, OR
2	3	4	Germany	Simone Osygus (2:03.45); Meike Freitag (2:02.36); Anke Scholz (2:02.14); Franziska van Almsick (2:00.63)	8:08.58	Q
3	3	5	Australia	Julia Greville (2:01.48); Lise Mackie (2:03.75); Emma Johnson (2:02.65); Susie O'Neill (2:01.45)	8:09.33	Q
4	1	5	Japan	Eri Yamanoi (2:02.64); Naoko Imoto (2:01.88); Aiko Miyake (2:04.52); Suzu Chiba (2:00.42)	8:09.46	Q, NR
5	3	6	Romania	Luminița Dobrescu (2:01.50); Loredana Zisu (2:05.05); Lorena Diaconescu (2:02.25); Carla Negrea (2:01.97)	8:10.77	Q, NR
6	2	5	Canada	Joanne Malar (2:04.10); Sophie Simard (2:02.94); Marianne Limpert (2:02.90); Jessica Deglau (2:02.09)	8:12.03	Q
7	1	3	Netherlands	Minouche Smit (2:03.27); Patricia Stokkers (2:03.35); Karin Brienesse (2:04.06); Carla Geurts (2:02.10)	8:12.78	Q, NR
8	1	4	China	Chen Yan (2:03.63); Pu Yiqi (2:04.49); Wang Luna (2:03.16); Nian Yun (2:02.01)	8:13.29	Q
9	2	3	Sweden	Louise Jöhncke (2:02.73); Johanna Sjöberg (2:03.04); Josefin Lillhage (2:03.85); Åsa Sandlund (2:04.02)	8:13.64	
10	2	6	Great Britain	Claire Huddart (2:05.34); Vicky Horner (2:03.11); Janine Belton (2:04.10); Karen Pickering (2:02.37)	8:14.92	NR
11	2	2	New Zealand	Sarah Catherwood (2:03.66); Alison Fitch (2:03.30); Anna Wilson (2:05.83); Dionne Bainbridge (2:02.19)	8:14.98	
12	3	2	Russia	Tatyana Litovchenko (2:04.96); Inna Yaitskaya (2:04.31); Yelena Nazemnova (2:04.27); Nadezhda Chemezova (2:02.52)	8:16.06	
13	3	3	Denmark	Ditte Jensen (2:04.89); Britta Vestergaard (2:04.44); Britt Raaby (2:03.98); Berit Puggaard (2:03.01)	8:16.32	
14	1	6	France	Marianne Le Verge (2:05.33); Hélène Ricardo (2:05.50); Laëtitia Choux (2:04.90); Solenne Figuès (2:03.17)	8:18.90	
15	3	1	Czech Republic	Hana Černá (2:02.95); Kristýna Kyněrová (2:03.31); Pavla Chrástová (2:08.02); Olga Šplíchalová (2:06.91)	8:21.19	NR
16	1	2	Switzerland	Sandrine Paquier (2:05.39); Dominique Diezi (2:05.38); Nicole Zahnd (2:06.10); Chantal Strasser (2:04.68)	8:21.55	NR
17	1	7	Belarus	Sviatlana Zhidko (2:04.89); Inga Borodich (2:06.27); Natalya Baranovskaya (2:05.87); Alena Popchanka (2:04.67)	8:21.70	NR
18	2	1	South Korea	Jeong Eun-na (2:06.15); Lee Bo-eun (2:04.32); Lee Jie-hyun (2:05.18); Seo So-yung (2:07.25)	8:22.90	
19	2	7	Chinese Taipei	Tsai Shu-min (2:04.61); Chang Wei-chia (2:08.07); Hsieh Shu-ting (2:09.12); Lin Chi-chan (2:05.81)	8:27.61	
20	3	7	Kyrgyzstan	Viktoriya Poleyayeva (2:09.68); Olga Titova (2:13.11); Olga Korotayeva (2:11.55); Olga Bogatyreva (2:11.42)	8:45.76	
21	1	1	Argentina	María del Pilar Pereyra (2:09.42); Alicia Barrancos (2:08.43); Valeria Álvarez (2:12.25); María Bertelloti (2:16.26)	8:46.36	

=== Final ===
Rank	Lane	Nation	Swimmers	Time	Notes
1st place, gold medalist(s)	4	United States	Trina Jackson (1:59.71); Cristina Teuscher (1:58.86); Sheila Taormina (2:01.29); Jenny Thompson (2:00.01)	7:59.87	OR
2nd place, silver medalist(s)	5	Germany	Franziska van Almsick (1:58.14); Kerstin Kielgaß (2:00.86); Anke Scholz (2:02.47); Dagmar Hase (2:00.08)	8:01.55	
3rd place, bronze medalist(s)	3	Australia	Julia Greville (2:01.06); Nicole Stevenson (2:03.23); Emma Johnson (2:01.21); Susie O'Neill (1:59.97)	8:05.47	
4	6	Japan	Eri Yamanoi (2:01.03); Naoko Imoto (2:01.47); Aiko Miyake (2:04.07); Suzu Chiba (2:00.89)	8:07.46	NR
5	7	Canada	Marianne Limpert (2:03.09); Shannon Shakespeare (2:00.72); Andrea Schwartz (2:02.01); Jessica Deglau (2:02.34)	8:08.16	
6	1	Netherlands	Carla Geurts (2:01.53); Patricia Stokkers (2:03.00); Minouche Smit (2:02.05); Kirsten Vlieghuis (2:01.90)	8:08.48	NR
7	2	Romania	Luminița Dobrescu (2:01.40); Loredana Zisu (2:03.20); Lorena Diaconescu (2:02.07); Carla Negrea (2:03.35)	8:10.02	NR
8	8	China	Nian Yun (2:03.32); Wang Luna (2:02.58); Chen Yan (2:02.08); Shan Ying (2:07.40)	8:15.38	
