= Romania at the 1996 Summer Olympics =

- IOC code: ROU (ROM used at these Games)
- NOC: Romanian Olympic Committee
- Website: www.cosr.ro (in Romanian, English, and French)

in Atlanta
- Competitors: 165 (98 men and 67 women) in 18 sports
- Flag bearer: Iulică Ruican
- Medals Ranked 14th: Gold 4 Silver 7 Bronze 9 Total 20

Summer Olympics appearances (overview)
- 1900; 1904–1920; 1924; 1928; 1932; 1936; 1948; 1952; 1956; 1960; 1964; 1968; 1972; 1976; 1980; 1984; 1988; 1992; 1996; 2000; 2004; 2008; 2012; 2016; 2020; 2024; 2028

Romania competed at the 1996 Summer Olympics in Atlanta, United States. 165 competitors, 98 men and 67 women, took part in 122 events in 18 sports.

== Medalists ==
Medal	Name	Sport	Event	Date
Gold	Laura Badea	Fencing	Women's individual foil	July 22
Gold	Simona Amânar	Gymnastics	Women's vault	July 28
Gold	Constanța Burcică-Pipota; Camelia Macoviciuc	Rowing	Women's lightweight double sculls	July 28
Gold	Vera Cochela; Liliana Gafencu; Elena Georgescu; Doina Ignat; Elisabeta Lipă; Ioana Olteanu; Mărioara Popescu; Doina Spircu; Anca Tănase	Rowing	Women's eight	July 28
Silver	Gabriela Szabo	Athletics	Women's 1500 metres	August 3
Silver	Antonel Borșan; Marcel Glăvan	Canoeing	Men's C-2 1000 metres	August 3
Silver	Laura Badea; Roxana Scarlat; Reka Szabo	Fencing	Women's team foil	July 25
Silver	Marius Urzică	Gymnastics	Men's pommel horse	July 28
Silver	Dan Burincă	Gymnastics	Men's rings	July 28
Silver	Gina Gogean	Gymnastics	Women's artistic individual all-around	July 25
Silver	Simona Amânar	Gymnastics	Women's floor	July 29
Bronze	Leonard Doroftei	Boxing	Lightweight	August 4
Bronze	Marian Simion	Boxing	Welterweight	August 4
Bronze	Gheorghe Andriev; Grigore Obreja	Canoeing	Men's C-2 500 metres	August 4
Bronze	Simona Amânar	Gymnastics	Women's artistic individual all-around	July 25
Bronze	Lavinia Miloșovici	Gymnastics	Women's artistic individual all-around	July 25
Bronze	Gina Gogean	Gymnastics	Women's vault	July 28
Bronze	Gina Gogean	Gymnastics	Women's balance beam	July 29
Bronze	Simona Amânar; Gina Gogean; Ionela Loaieș; Alexandra Marinescu; Lavinia Miloșovici; Mirela Ţugurlan	Gymnastics	Women's artistic team all-around	July 23
Bronze	Nicu Vlad	Weightlifting	Men's 108 kg	July 30

Medals by sport
Sport	1st place, gold medalist(s)	2nd place, silver medalist(s)	3rd place, bronze medalist(s)	Total
Athletics	0	1	0	1
Boxing	0	0	2	2
Canoeing	0	1	1	2
Fencing	1	1	0	2
Gymnastics	1	4	5	10
Rowing	2	0	0	2
Weightlifting	0	0	1	1
Total	4	7	9	20

Medals by gender
Gender	1st place, gold medalist(s)	2nd place, silver medalist(s)	3rd place, bronze medalist(s)	Total
Male	0	3	4	7
Female	4	4	5	13
Total	4	7	9	20

== Athletics ==
Men's 1,500 metres

- Ovidiu Olteanu

- Qualification — 3:38.33 (→ did not advance)

Men's 400m Hurdles

- Mugur Mateescu

- Heat — 49.97s (→ did not advance)

Men's 3,000 metres Steeplechase

- Florin Ionescu

- Heat — 8:31.34
- Semifinals — 8:28.77 (→ did not advance)

Men's Long Jump

- Bogdan Tarus

- Qualification — 7.96m (→ did not advance)

- Bogdan Tudor

- Qualification — 7.88m (→ did not advance)

Men's Discus Throw

- Costel Grasu

- Qualification — 58.56m (→ did not advance)

Men's 20 km Walk

- Costică Bălan

Women's 10.000 metres

- Iulia Negura

- Qualification — 31:40.16
- Final — 31:26.46 (→ 8th place)

Women's 400m Hurdles

- Ionela Târlea

- Qualification — 55.42
- Semifinals — 54.41
- Final — 54.40 (→ 7th place)

Women's Javelin Throw

- Felicia Tilea

- Qualification — 66.94m
- Final — 59.94m (→ 10th place)

Women's Discus Throw

- Nicole Grasu

- Qualification — 63.00m
- Final — 63.28m (→ 7th place)

- Cristina Boit

- Qualification — 58.10m (→ did not advance)

Women's Long Jump

- Mihaela Gheorghiu

- Qualification — NM (→ did not advance)

Women's Triple Jump

- Rodica Mateescu

- Qualification — 14.22m
- Final — 14.21m (→ 8th place)

Women's Heptathlon

- Liliana Nastase

- Final Result — 5847 points (→ 22nd place)

Women's Marathon

- Lidia Șimon — 2:31.04 (→ 6th place)
- Anuța Cătună — 2:42.01 (→ 44th place)
- Cristina Pomacu — did not finish (→ no ranking)

Women's 10 km Walk

- Norica Câmpean — 46:19 (→ 29th place)

== Boxing ==
Men's Light Flyweight (– 48 kg)

- Sabin Bornei

- First Round — Defeated José Pérez Reyes (Dominican Republic), 16-10
- Second Round — Lost to Somrot Kamsing (Thailand), 7-18

Men's Bantamweight (– 54 kg)

- George Olteanu

- First Round — Defeated Samuel Álvarez (Mexico), referee stopped contest in third round
- Second Round — Defeated Kalai Riadh (Tunisia), 16-3
- Quarter Finals — Lost to István Kovács (Hungary), 2-24

Men's Lightweight (– 60 kg)

- Leonard Doroftei → Bronze Medal

- First Round — Defeated Julio Mboumba (Gabon), referee stopped contest in second round
- Second Round — Defeated Sergey Kopenkin (Kyrgyzstan), 10-1
- Quarter Finals — Defeated Koba Gogoladze (Georgia), 17-8
- Semi Finals — Lost to Hocine Soltani (Algeria), 6-9

Men's Lightweight (– 67 kg)

- Marian Simion → Bronze Medal

- First Round — Defeated Hussein Bayram (France), 13-6
- Second Round — Defeated Fernando Vargas (United States), 8-7
- Quarter Finals — Defeated Hasan Al (Denmark), 16-8
- Semi Finals — Lost to Juan Hernández Sierra (Cuba), 7-20

Men's Light Middleweight (– 71 kg)

- Francisc Vaștag

- First Round — Lost to Markus Beyer (Germany), 12-17

Men's Heavyweight (– 91 kg)

- Ovidiu Bali

- First Round — Bye
- Second Round — Lost to Christophe Mendy (France), referee stopped contest in second round

== Diving ==
Women's 10m Platform

- Clara Elena Ciocan

- Preliminary Heat — 281.52
- Semi Final — 157.41
- Final — 256.05 (→ 10th place)

- Anisoara Opriea

- Preliminary Heat — 233.34 (→ did not advance, 22nd place)

== Fencing ==
Nine fencers, six men and three women, represented Romania in 1996.

Men's épée

- Gheorghe Epurescu
- Gabriel Pantelimon
- Aurel Bratu

Men's team épée

- Aurel Bratu, Gheorghe Epurescu, Gabriel Pantelimon

Men's sabre

- Vilmoș Szabo
- Florin Lupeică
- Mihai Covaliu

Men's team sabre

- Florin Lupeică, Mihai Covaliu, Vilmoș Szabo

Women's foil

- Laura Cârlescu-Badea
- Roxana Scarlat
- Reka Zsofia Lazăr-Szabo

Women's team foil

- Laura Cârlescu-Badea, Reka Zsofia Lazăr-Szabo, Roxana Scarlat

== Modern pentathlon ==
Men's Individual Competition

- Adrian Toader — 5335 pts (→ 14th place)

== Swimming ==
Men's 100 m Freestyle

- Nicolae Ivan

- Heat — 51.14 (→ did not advance, 30th place)

Men's 200 m Freestyle

- Nicolae Butacu

- Heat — 1:50.83
- B-Final — 1:51.46 (→ 16th place)

Men's 100 m Backstroke

- Nicolae Butacu

- Heat — 56.73 (→ did not advance, 21st place)

Men's 200 m Backstroke

- Nicolae Butacu

- Heat — 2:08.59 (→ did not advance, 34th place)

Men's 100 m Butterfly

- Răzvan Petcu

- Heat — 55.50 (→ did not advance, 35th place)

Men's 4 × 100 m Freestyle Relay

- Nicolae Ivan, Răzvan Petcu, Horațiu Badiță, and Alexandru Ioanovici

- Heat — 3:21.66 (→ did not advance, 10th place)

Women's 50 m Freestyle

- Luminița Dobrescu

- Heat — 26.47 (→ did not advance, 27th place)

Women's 100 m Freestyle

- Luminița Dobrescu

- Heat — 56.27
- B-Final — 55.98 (→ 11th place)

Women's 200 m Freestyle

- Luminița Dobrescu

- Heat — 2:00.85
- Final — 2:01.63 (→ 8th place)

- Ioana Diaconescu

- Heat — 2:04.59 (→ did not advance, 25th place)

Women's 400 m Freestyle

- Carla Negrea

- Heat — 4:16.89
- B-Final — 4:17.08 (→ 16th place)

Women's 800 m Freestyle

- Carla Negrea

- Heat — 8:54.19 (→ did not advance, 20th place)

Women's 200 m Backstroke

- Cătălina Căsaru

- Heat — 2:15.92
- B-Final — 2:15.15 (→ 14th place)

Women's 100 m Breaststroke

- Larisa Lăcustă

- Heat — 1:13.91 (→ did not advance, 35th place)

Women's 100 m Butterfly

- Loredana Zisu

- Heat — 1:02.66 (→ did not advance, 23rd place)

Women's 200 m Butterfly

- Loredana Zisu

- Heat — 2:17.56 (→ did not advance, 21st place)

Women's 200 m Individual Medley

- Beatrice Câșlaru

- Heat — 2:16.80
- B-Final — 2:16.75 (→ 12th place)

Women's 400 m Individual Medley

- Beatrice Câșlaru

- Heat — 4:44.66
- Final — 4:44.91 (→ 6th place)

Women's 4 × 100 m Freestyle Relay

- Ioana Diaconescu, Florina Herea, Andrea Trufașu, and Luminița Dobrescu

- Heat – 3:48.43 (→ did not advance, 11th place)

Women's 4 × 200 m Freestyle Relay

- Luminița Dobrescu, Loredana Zisu, Ioana Diaconescu, and Carla Negrea

- Heat – 8:10.77
- Final – 8:10.02 (→ 7th place)

Women's 4 × 100 m Medley Relay

- Catalina Căsaru, Beatrice Câșlaru, Loredana Zisu, and Luminița Dobrescu

- Heat – 4:16.18 (→ did not advance, 17th place)

== Tennis ==
Women's Singles Competition

- Cătălina Cristea

- First round — Lost to Anke Huber (Germany) 6-2 4-6 2-6

- Ruxandra Dragomir

- First round — Lost to Jana Novotná (Czech Republic) 4-6 4-4 retired

== Water polo ==
=== Men's team competition ===
- Preliminary round (group B)

- Romania – Ukraine 6-6
- Romania – Croatia 6-11
- Romania – Greece 5-8
- Romania – United States 5-10
- Romania – Italy 9-10

- Classification Matches

- 9th/12th place: Romania – Netherlands 8-10
- 9th/12th place: Romania – Ukraine 11-8
- 9th/12th place: Romania – Germany 6-10 (→ Eleventh place)

- Team roster

- Edward Andrei
- Florin Bonca
- Robert Dinu
- Niculae Fulgeanu
- Vlad Hagiu
- Gelu Lisac
- Istvan Moldvai
- Daniel Radu
- Bogdan Rath
- Radu Sabău
- Stefan Sanda
- Dinel Stemate
- Liviu Totolici

- Head coach: Rus Viorel

== Weightlifting ==
Men's 108 kg

- Nicu Vlad

- Snatch — 197.5 kg
- Clean & Jerk — 222.5 kg
- Total — 420.0 kg (→ Bronze Medal)

== Notes ==
- Watkins, Ginger T., ed. (1997). The Official Report of the Centennial Olympic Games, Volume III The Competition Results (PDF). Atlanta: Peachtree Publishers. ISBN 1-56145-150-9.
- "Olympic Medal Winners". International Olympic Committee.
