= South Korea at the 1996 Summer Olympics =

- IOC code: KOR
- NOC: Korean Olympic Committee
- Website: www.sports.or.kr (in Korean and English)

in Atlanta
- Competitors: 300 (189 men and 111 women) in 25 sports
- Flag bearer: Choi Cheon-sik
- Medals Ranked 10th: Gold 7 Silver 15 Bronze 5 Total 27

Summer Olympics appearances (overview)
- 1948; 1952; 1956; 1960; 1964; 1968; 1972; 1976; 1980; 1984; 1988; 1992; 1996; 2000; 2004; 2008; 2012; 2016; 2020; 2024; 2028

South Korea competed as Korea at the 1996 Summer Olympics in Atlanta, United States. 300 competitors, 189 men and 111 women, took part in 160 events in 25 sports.

== Medalists ==
Medal	Name	Sport	Event	Date
Gold	Sim Kwon-ho	Wrestling	Greco-Roman 48 kg	21 July
Gold	Jeon Ki-young	Judo	Men's 86 kg	22 July
Gold	Cho Min-sun	Judo	Women's 66 kg	22 July
Gold	Kim Kyung-wook	Archery	Women's Individual	31 July
Gold	Kim Dong-moon; Gil Young-ah	Badminton	Mixed doubles	1 August
Gold	Bang Soo-hyun	Badminton	Women's Singles	1 August
Gold	Kim Kyung-wook; Kim Jo-sun; Yoon Hye-young	Archery	Women's team	2 August
Silver	Kim Min-soo	Judo	Men's 95 kg	21 July
Silver	Kwak Dae-sung	Judo	Men's 71 kg	24 July
Silver	Jung Sun-yong	Judo	Women's 56 kg	24 July
Silver	Hyun Sook-hee	Judo	Women's 52 kg	25 July
Silver	Yeo Hong-chul	Gymnastics	Men's vault	29 July
Silver	Yang Hyun-mo	Wrestling	Men's freestyle 82 kg	30 July
Silver	Gil Young-ah; Jang Hye-ock	Badminton	Women's Doubles	31 July
Silver	Park Joo-bong; Ra Kyung-min	Badminton	Mixed doubles	1 August
Silver	You Jae-sook; Lim Jeong-sook; Oh Seung-shin; Woo Hyun-jung; Lee Eun-young; Lee Eun-kyung; Lee Ji-young; Kwon Chang-sook; Kwon Soo-hyun; Kim Myung-ok; Choi Mi-soon; Jeon Young-sun; Jin Deok-san; Chang Eun-jung; Cho Eun-jung; Choi Eun-kyung	Field Hockey	Women's tournament	1 August
Silver	Oh Kyo-moon; Kim Bo-ram; Jang Yong-ho	Archery	Men's team	2 August
Silver	Jang Jae-sung	Wrestling	Men's freestyle 62 kg	2 August
Silver	Park Jang-soon	Wrestling	Men's freestyle 74 kg	2 August
Silver	Cho Eun-hee; Han Sun-hee; Hong Jeong-ho; Huh Soon-young; Kim Cheong-sim; Kim Eun-mi; Kim Jeong-mi; Kim Mi-sim; Kim Rang; Kwag Hye-jeong; Lee Sang-eun; Lim O-kyeong; Moon Hyang-ja; Oh Seong-ok; Oh Yong-ran; Park Jeong-lim	Handball	Women's tournament	3 August
Silver	Lee Bong-ju	Athletics	Men's Marathon	4 August
Silver	Lee Seung-bae	Boxing	Light heavyweight	4 August
Bronze	Cho In-chul	Judo	Men's 78 kg	23 July
Bronze	Jung Sung-sook	Judo	Women's 61 kg	23 July
Bronze	Ryu Ji-hae; Park Hae-jung	Table Tennis	Women's doubles	29 July
Bronze	Yoo Nam-kyu; Lee Chul-seung	Table Tennis	Men's doubles	30 July
Bronze	Oh Kyo-moon	Archery	Men's individual	1 August

== Archery ==
Korea's fifth appearance in Olympic archery earned them another pair of gold medals in the women's competitions as well as a silver medal and a bronze medal in the men's competitions. The only individual eliminated before the quarterfinals was Yoon Hye-Young, though she did set an Olympic record in the 36 arrow R32/R16 combined.

Men's Individual Competition:

- Oh Kyo-moon - Bronze medal match, Bronze medal (5-1)
- Kim Bo-ram - Quarterfinal, 5th place (3-1)
- Jang Yong-ho - Quarterfinal, 7th place (3-1)

Women's Individual Competition:

- Kim Kyung-wook - Final, Gold medal (6-0)
- Kim So-jun - Quarterfinal, 6th place (3-1)
- Yoon Hye-young - Round of 16, 9th place (2-1)

Men's Team Competition:

- Oh, Kim, and Jang - Final, Silver medal (3-1)

Women's Team Competition:

- Kim, Kim, and Yoon - Final, Gold medal (4-0)

== Athletics ==
Men's High Jump

- Lee Jin-taek

- Qualification — 2.28m

- Final — 2.29m (→ 8th place)

Men's Long Jump

- Sung Hee-jun

- Qualification — NM (→ did not advance)

Men's Marathon

- Lee Bong-ju — 2:12.39 (→ Silver medal)
- Kim Yi-yong — 2:16.17 (→ 12th place)
- Kim Wan-ki — did not finish (→ no ranking)

Women's Javelin Throw

- Lee Young-sun

- Qualification — 58.66m (→ did not advance)

Women's Shot Put

- Lee Myung-sun

- Qualification — 16.92m (→ did not advance)

Women's Marathon

- Oh Mi-ja — 2:36.54 (→ 30th place)
- Kang Soon-duk — did not finish (→ no ranking)
- Lee Mi-kyung — did not finish (→ no ranking)

== Baseball ==
Korea's first appearance in the Olympic baseball tournament resulted in a last-place finish for the team. The Koreans won only one game in the preliminary round, defeating the Netherlands. This put them in eighth place and ended their involvement in the competition.

Men's Team Competition:

- South Korea - 8th place (1-6)

== Basketball ==
=== Men's tournament ===
Preliminary round

Pos	Team	Pld	W	L	PF	PA	PD	Pts	Qualification
1	FR Yugoslavia	5	5	0	478	364	+114	10	Quarterfinals
2	Australia	5	4	1	492	438	+54	9	Quarterfinals
3	Greece	5	3	2	402	416	−14	8	Quarterfinals
4	Brazil	5	2	3	498	494	+4	7	Quarterfinals
5	Puerto Rico	5	1	4	447	465	−18	6	9th place playoff
6	South Korea	5	0	5	422	562	−140	5	11th place playoff

Source: FIBA archive
Rules for classification: 1) points; 2) head-to-head points; 3) head-to-head goal average; 4) head-to-head number of points scored.

20 July 1996

Report

Australia	111–88	South Korea
Scoring by half: 64–37, 47–51
Pts: Gaze 26; Rebs: Dorge 10; Asts: Heal 11		Pts: J. K. Jung 23; Rebs: J. K. Jung 8 Asts: D. H. Kang 8

Atlanta
Referees: Davorin Nakic (CRO), Hidetoshi Ishida (JPN)

22 July 1996

Report

South Korea	86–98	Puerto Rico
Scoring by half: 52–51, 34–47
Pts: K. E. Moon 20; Rebs: J. Y. Hyun 11; Asts: Hur Jae 12		Pts: Ortiz 37; Rebs: Ortiz 14; Asts: Alicea 10

Atlanta
Referees: Roman Ryzhyk (UKR), Antonio Soares De Campos (ANG)

24 July 1996

Report

FR Yugoslavia	118–65	South Korea
Scoring by half: 57–28, 61–37
Pts: Danilović 19; Rebs: Divac 8 Asts: Đorđević 10		Pts: J. Y. Hyun 20; Rebs: D. H. Kang 4 Asts: Hur Jae 5

Atlanta
Referees: Joseph Derosa (USA), Virun Thongpila (THA)

26 July 1996

Report

South Korea	86–108	Greece
Scoring by half: 44–56, 42–52
Pts: J. Y. Hyun 24; Rebs: J. Y. Hyun 6 Asts: D. H. Kang 10		Pts: Sigalas 22; Rebs: Rentzias 8 Asts: Bakatsias, Sigalas 6

Atlanta
Referees: Romualdas Brazauskas (LTU), Yi Cui (CHN)

28 July 1996

Report

Brazil	127–97	South Korea
Scoring by half: 66–49, 61–48
Pts: Schmidt 25; Rebs: dos Santos 8 Asts: Minuci 9		Pts: D. H. Kang 24; Rebs: J. Y. Hyun 6 Asts: D. H. Kang 7

Atlanta
Referees: Jiazhong Zhu (CHN), Tomislav Jovancic (YUG)

9th−12th place classification

30 July 1996
15:00

Report

Argentina	97–79	South Korea
Scoring by half: 44–41, 53–38
Pts: Espil 26; Rebs: Pérez 9 Asts: Espil 8		Pts: J. K. Jung 17; Rebs: H. C. Chun 8 Asts: D. H. Kang 8

Atlanta
Referees: Joseph Derosa (USA), Zhu Jiazhong (CHN)

11th place match

2 August 1996
10:00

Report

South Korea	61–99	Angola
Scoring by half: 33–48, 28–51
Pts: D. H. Kang 17; Rebs: H. C. Chun 5 Asts: S. M. Lee, D. H. Kang 6		Pts: Dias 27; Rebs: Dias 11; Asts: Moreira 5

Atlanta
Referees: Jose Reyes Ronfini (MEX), Juan Brea Diaz (CUB)

=== Women's tournament ===
Preliminary round

Pos	Team	Pld	W	L	PF	PA	PD	Pts	Qualification
1	United States (H)	5	5	0	507	339	+168	10	Quarterfinals
2	Ukraine	5	3	2	354	358	−4	8 (Note: Head-to-head record: Ukraine 1–0 Australia)	Quarterfinals
3	Australia	5	3	2	369	319	+50	8	Quarterfinals
4	Cuba	5	2	3	365	377	−12	7 (Note: Head-to-head record: Cuba 1–0 South Korea)	Quarterfinals
5	South Korea	5	2	3	347	389	−42	7	
6	Zaire	5	0	5	287	447	−160	5	

Source: FIBA archive
Rules for classification: 1) points; 2) head-to-head points; 3) head-to-head goal average; 4) head-to-head number of points scored.
(H) Hosts
Notes:

21 July 1996

Boxscores

South Korea	61–76	Australia
Pts: Yoo Y-j 16; Rebs: Yu Y-j 9 Asts: Chun J-w 5		Pts: Sporn 21; Rebs: Sporn, Sandie 10; Asts: Timms 5

Morehouse College Gymnasium, Atlanta

23 July 1996

Boxscore

Cuba	70–55	South Korea
Pts: León 20; Rebs: Martínez 14; Asts: León, Henry 4		Pts: Jung S-m 16; Rebs: Chun J-w 9 Asts: Chun E-s 3

Morehouse College Gymnasium, Atlanta

25 July 1996

Boxscore

South Korea	72–67	Ukraine
Pts: Yoo Y-j, Chun E-s 14; Rebs: Jung S-m 7 Asts: Chun E-s, Chun J-w 5		Pts: Tkachenko 21; Rebs: Tkachenko 11; Asts: Zhyrko 8

Morehouse College Gymnasium, Atlanta

27 July 1996

Boxscore

Zaire	71–95	South Korea
Pts: Mabika 30; Rebs: Tshijuka, Ngalula 7 Asts: Ngalula 3		Pts: Chun E-s 29; Rebs: Chun J-w 6 Asts: Chun E-s 14

Morehouse College Gymnasium, Atlanta

29 July 1996

Boxscore

South Korea	64–105	United States
Pts: Jung S-m 17; Rebs: Jung S-m 6 Asts: Chun J-w 7		Pts: McCray 16; Rebs: McCray 9 Asts: Swoopes 4

Morehouse College Gymnasium, Atlanta

9th−12th place classification

31 July 1996
12:00

Boxscore

Canada	79–88	South Korea
Scoring by half: 41–37, 38–51
Pts: Norman 17; Rebs: Norman 8 Asts: Karch-Gailus 8		Pts: Chun J-w 31; Rebs: Jung S-m, Yoo Y-j 4 Asts: Chun J-w 9

Georgia Dome, Atlanta

9th place match

3 August 1996
12:00

Boxscore

China	85–71	South Korea
Scoring by half: 48–39, 37–32
Pts: Zheng H 29; Rebs: Zheng H 10; Asts: Zheng D 10		Pts: Chun J-w 20; Rebs: Yoo Y-j 6 Asts: Han H-s 5

Georgia Dome, Atlanta

== Boxing ==
Men's Bantamweight (– 54 kg)

- Bae Gi-ung

Men's Featherweight (– 57 kg)

- Shin Su-yeong

- First round — Lost to Ramaz Paliani (Russia), 7-10

Men's Lightweight

- Shin Eun-chul

Men's Light-Welterweight

- Han Hyeong-min

Men's Welterweight

- Bae Ho-jo

Men's Light-Middleweight

- Lee Wan-gyun

Men's Middleweight (– 75 kg)

- Mun Im-cheol

- First round — Lost to Bertrand Tetsia (Cameroon), 2-12

Men's Light-Heavyweight (– 81 kg)

- Lee Seung-bae

Men's Heavyweight (– 91 kg)

- Go Yeong-sam

== Cycling ==
=== Road Competition ===
Women's Individual Road Race

- Kim Yong-Mi

- Final — did not finish (→ no ranking)

=== Track Competition ===
Men's Points Race

- Cho Ho-sung

- Final — 6 points (→ 7th place)

== Diving ==
Men's 3m Springboard

- Lee Jong-hee

- Preliminary Heat — 293.52 (→ did not advance, 32nd place)

Women's 10m Platform

- Im Youn-gi

- Preliminary Heat — 180.15 (→ did not advance, 31st place)

- Kim Yeo-young

- Preliminary Heat — 166.56 (→ did not advance, 32nd place)

== Fencing ==
Thirteen fencers, nine men and 4 women, represented South Korea in 1996.

Men's foil

- Kim Yeong-ho
- Kim Yong-guk
- Jeong Su-gi

Men's team foil

- Jeong Su-gi, Kim Yong-guk, Kim Yeong-ho

Men's épée

- Yang Noe-seong
- Jang Tae-seok
- Lee Sang-gi

Men's team épée

- Jang Tae-seok, Lee Sang-gi, Yang Noe-seong

Men's sabre

- Yu Sang-ju
- Seo Seong-jun
- Lee Hyo-geun

Men's team sabre

- Lee Hyo-geun, Seo Seong-jun, Yu Sang-ju

Women's foil

- Jeon Mi-gyeong

Women's épée

- Go Jeong-jeon
- Kim Hui-jeong
- Lee Geum-nam

Women's team épée

- Kim Hui-jeong, Go Jeong-jeon, Lee Geum-nam

== Hockey ==
=== Men's team competition ===
- Preliminary round (group B)

- South Korea – Great Britain 2–2
- South Korea – Australia 2–3
- South Korea – South Africa 3–3
- South Korea – Netherlands 1–3
- South Korea – Malaysia 4–2

- Classification Matches

- 5th/8th place: South Korea – India 4–4 (South Korea wins after penalty strokes, 5–3)
- 5th/6th place: South Korea – Pakistan 3–1 → Fifth place

- Team roster

- Koo Jin-soo
- Shin Seok-kyo
- Han Beung-kook
- You Myung-keun
- Cho Myung-jun
- Jeon Jong-ha
- You Seung-jin
- Park Shin-heum
- Kang Keon-wook
- Kim Jong-yi
- Jeong Yong-kyun
- Song Seung-tae
- Kim Yong-bae
- Hong Kyung-suep
- Kim Young-kyu
- Kim Yoon

=== Women's team competition ===
- Preliminary Round Robin

- South Korea – Great Britain 5–0
- South Korea – United States 2–3
- South Korea – Netherlands 3–1
- South Korea – Australia 3–3
- South Korea – Spain 2–0

== Modern pentathlon ==
Men's:

- Kim Mi-sub – 5367pts (11th place)

== Shooting ==
Fourteen South Korean shooters (six men and eight women) qualified to compete in the following events:

Men

Athlete	Event	Qualification		Final	
Athlete	Event	Points	Rank	Points	Rank
Park Chul-sung	Double trap	138	6 Q	183	4
Lee Eun-chul	50 m rifle prone	596	7 Q	699.1	7
Lee Eun-chul	50 m rifle 3 positions	1163	18	Did not advance	
Lee Eun-chul	10 m air rifle	590	11	Did not advance	
Kim Sung-joon	50 m pistol	548	37	Did not advance	
Kim Sung-joon	10 m air pistol	579	12	Did not advance	
Kim Sung-joon	50 m pistol	560	11	Did not advance	
Kim Sung-joon	10 m air pistol	573	36	Did not advance	
Cha Young-chul	50 m rifle prone	591	36	Did not advance	
Cha Young-chul	50 m rifle 3 positions	1154	40	Did not advance	
Lim Young-sueb	10 m air rifle	590	11	Did not advance	

Women

Athlete	Event	Qualification		Final	
Athlete	Event	Points	Rank	Points	Rank
Weon Gyung-sook	50 m rifle 3 positions	568	32	Did not advance	
Lee Ho-sook	10 m air pistol	382	9	Did not advance	
Kong Hyun-ah	50 m rifle 3 positions	583	6 Q	675.8	6
Park Jung-hee	25 m pistol	574	21	Did not advance	
Kim Jung-mi	10 m air rifle	391	19	Did not advance	
Lee Sang-hui	Double trap	95	17	Did not advance	
Boo Soon-hee	10 m air pistol	379	15	Did not advance	
Boo Soon-hee	25 m pistol	583	5 Q	683.9	4
Jin Soon-young	10 m air rifle	393	9	Did not advance	

== Swimming ==
Men's 200m Freestyle

- Koh Yun-ho
  1. Heat – 1:52.80 (→ did not advance, 26th place)

Men's 400m Freestyle

- Woo Cheol
  1. Heat – 4:03.11 (→ did not advance, 30th place)

Men's 1500m Freestyle

- Lee Gyu-chang
  1. Heat – 15:47.92 (→ did not advance, 25th place)

Men's 100m Backstroke

- Kim Min-seok
  1. Heat – 58.43 (→ did not advance, 42nd place)

Men's 200m Backstroke

- Ji Sang-jun
  1. Heat – 2:01.39
  2. B-Final – 2:02.68 (→ 14th place)

Men's 100m Breaststroke

- Cho Kwang-jea
  1. Heat – 1:03.39 (→ did not advance, 24th place)

Men's 200m Butterfly

- Cho Kwang-jea
  1. Heat – 2:04.53 (→ did not advance, 35th place)

Men's 200m Individual Medley

- Kim Bang-hyun
  1. Heat – 2:06.99 (→ did not advance, 26th place)

Men's 400m Individual Medley

- Kim Bang-hyun
  1. Heat – 4:31.16 (→ did not advance, 21st place)

Men's 4 × 200 m Freestyle Relay

- Koh Yun-ho, Lee Gyu-chang, Woo Cheol, and Kim Min-seok
  1. Heat – 7:45.98 (→ did not advance, 14th place)

Men's 4 × 100 m Medley Relay

- Kim Min-Seok, Cho Kwang-jea, Yang Dae-chu, and Koh Yun-ho
  1. Heat – 3:50.83 (→ did not advance, 17th place)

Women's 100m Freestyle

- Lee Bo-eun
  1. Heat – 58.27 (→ did not advance, 35th place)

Women's 200m Freestyle

- Lee Jie-hyun
  1. Heat – 2:05.78 (→ did not advance, 32nd place)

Women's 400m Freestyle

- Jeong Eun-na
  1. Heat – 4:23.35 (→ did not advance, 31st place)

Women's 800m Freestyle

- Suh Hyun-soo
  1. Heat – 9:03.22 (→ did not advance, 24th place)

Women's 100m Backstroke

- Lee Ji-hyun
  1. Heat – 1:03.96 (→ did not advance, 18th place)

Women's 200m Backstroke

- Lee Chang-ha
  1. Heat – 2:14.18
  2. B-Final – 2:14.55 (→ 13th place)

Women's 100m Breaststroke

- Byun Hye-young
  1. Heat – 1:12.85 (→ did not advance, 30th place)

Women's 200m Breaststroke

- Roh Joo-hee
  1. Heat – 2:36.20 (→ did not advance, 26th place)

Women's 200m Individual Medley

- Lee Jie-hyun
  1. Heat – 2:22.97 (→ did not advance, 35th place)

Women's 400m Individual Medley

- Lee Ji-hyun
  1. Heat – 4:59.52 (→ did not advance, 28th place)

Women's 4 × 100 m Freestyle Relay

- Lee Bo-eun, Seo So-yung, Lee Jie-hyun, and Jeong Eun-na
  1. Heat – 3:57.83 (→ did not advance, 19th place)

Women's 4 × 200 m Freestyle Relay

- Jeong Eun-na, Lee Bo-eun, Lee Jie-hyun, and Seo So-yung
  1. Heat – 8:22.90 (→ did not advance, 18th place)

Women's 4 × 100 m Medley Relay

- Lee Ji-hyun, Byun Hye-young, Park Woo-hee, and Lee Bo-eun
  1. Heat – 4:18.98 (→ did not advance, 18th place)

== Tennis ==
Athlete	Event	Round of 64	Round of 32	Round of 16	Quarterfinals	Semifinals	Final / BM	
Athlete	Event	Opposition Score	Opposition Score	Opposition Score	Opposition Score	Opposition Score	Opposition Score	Rank
Choi Young-ja	Women's singles	Joannette Kruger (RSA); W 6-7^{(5-7)}, 6–2, 6-1	Brenda Schultz-McCarthy (NED); L 2–6, 4-6	Did not advance				

== Volleyball ==
=== Men's Indoor Team Competition ===
- Preliminary round (group B)

- Lost to Italy (0-3)
- Lost to Yugoslavia (0-3)
- Lost to Russia (0-3)
- Defeated Tunisia (3-0)
- Lost to Netherlands (2-3) → Did not advance, 10th place

- Team roster

- Bang Sin-bong
- Shin Young-chul
- Choi Cheon-sik
- Ha Jong-hwa
- Im Do-hun
- Kim Sang-woo
- Kim Se-jin
- Lee Seong-hui
- Park Hee-sang
- Park Sun-chool
- Sin Jin-sik
- Shin Jung-sub

=== Women's Indoor Team Competition ===
- Preliminary round (group A)

- Defeated Japan (3-0)
- Lost to China (2-3)
- Defeated Ukraine (3-0)
- Lost to the Netherlands (1-3)
- Lost to United States (1-3)

- Quarterfinals

- Lost to Brazil (0-3)

- Classification Matches

- Defeated United States (3-0)
- Lost to the Netherlands (0-3) → Sixth place

- Team roster

- Chang So-yun
- Chang Yoon-hee
- Choi Kwang-hee
- Chung Sun-hye
- Eoh Yeon-soon
- Hong Ji-yeon
- Kang Hye-mi
- Kim Nam-soon
- Lee In-sook
- Lee Soo-jung
- Park Soo-jeong
- Yoo Yeon-gyeong

- Head coach: Kim Cheol-yong
