= List of Romanian records in swimming =

The Romanian Records in Swimming are the fastest times ever swum by an individual from Romania. These records are recognized and kept by Romania's national swimming federation: Federația Română de Natație şi Pentatlon Modern (FRNPM). (Note the federation also oversees Modern pentathlon.)

FRNPM keeps records for both for events in long course (50m) and short course (25m) pools, for males and females. Records are kept in the following events (by stroke):

- freestyle (liber): 50, 100, 200, 400, 800 and 1500;
- backstroke (spate): 50, 100 and 200;
- breaststroke (bras): 50, 100 and 200;
- butterfly (fluture): 50, 100 and 200;
- individual medley (mixt): 100 (25m only), 200 and 400;
- relays: 4 × 50 free, 4 × 100 free, 4 × 200 free, 4 × 50 medley, and 4 × 100 medley (club and national for all 5 relays).

== Long course (50m) ==
=== Men ===
Event	Time		Name	Club	Date	Meet	Location	Ref
50 m freestyle	21.82		David Popovici	Romania	26 June 2026	Sette Colli Trophy	Rome, Italy	
100 m freestyle	46.51	ER	David Popovici	Romania	31 July 2025	World Championships	Singapore, Singapore	
200 m freestyle	1:42.97	WJ	David Popovici	Romania	15 August 2022	European Championships	Rome, Italy	
400 m freestyle	3:46.70	h	Dragoș Coman	Romania	24 July 2005	World Championships	Montreal, Canada	
800 m freestyle	7:49.68		Vlad Stancu	Romania	8 July 2023	European Junior Championships	Belgrade, Serbia	
1500 m freestyle	14:57.97	h	Andrei-Theodor Proca	Romania	14 August 2026	European Championships	Paris, France	
50m backstroke	24.12	sf	Robert Glință	Romania	3 August 2018	European Championships	Glasgow, Great Britain	
100m backstroke	52.88		Robert Glință	Romania	20 May 2021	European Championships	Budapest, Hungary	
200m backstroke	1:56.45	sf	Răzvan Florea	Romania	14 August 2008	Olympic Games	Beijing, China	
50m breaststroke	27.47		Dragoș Agache	Romania	14 August 2010	European Championships	Budapest, Hungary	
100m breaststroke	1:00.85	sf	Darius Coman	Romania	19 August 2025	World Junior Championships	Otopeni, Romania	
200m breaststroke	2:11.89		Darius Coman	Romania	22 August 2025	World Junior Championships	Otopeni, Romania	
50m butterfly	23.10	sf	Vlad-stefan Mihalache	Romania	10 August 2026	European Championships	Paris, France	
100m butterfly	51.44	h	Denis Popescu	Romania	12 August 2026	European Championships	Paris, France	
200m butterfly	1:56.09	h	Ioan Gherghel	Romania	11 August 2008	Olympic Games	Beijing, China	
200m individual medley	1:58.86		Robert Badea	Clubul Sportiv al Armatei Steaua Bucuresti	22 April 2026	Romanian Championships	Otopeni, Romania	
400m individual medley	4:13.79		Robert Badea	Romania	23 August 2025	World Junior Championships	Otopeni, Romania	
4 × 50 m freestyle relay (club)	1:37.15		Vișan; Szakadti; Mandache; Mușat	CS Dinamo București	7 July 1983	Unknown	Bucharest, Romania	
4 × 50 m freestyle relay (national)								
4 × 100 m freestyle relay (club)	3:18.19		Denis Popescu (50.11); Bruno Dutra (50.76); Alessandro Vlad (50.35); David Popovici (46.97)	CS Dinamo București	24 April 2026	Romanian Championships	Otopeni, Romania	
4 × 100 m freestyle relay (national)	3:14.02		David Popovici (47.22); George Ratiu (49.48); Alexandru Szilagyi (49.49); Patrick Dinu (47.83)	Romania	20 June 2024	European Championships	Belgrade, Serbia	
4 × 200 m freestyle relay (club)	7:37.33		Alexandru Felix Maestru (1:53.15); Gheorghe Cristian Tătar (1:52.86); Casian Andrei Mincă (1:56.90); Bogdan Andrei Urichianu (1:56.22)	CSA Steaua București	14 April 2010	Romania Open Nationals	Pitești, Romania	
4 × 200 m freestyle relay (national)	7:28.43		Stefan Cozma (1:54.40); Vlad Stancu (1:53.23); Patrick Dinu (1:55.08); David Popovici (1:45.72)	Romania	9 April 2022	Multinations Junior Meet	Kranj, Slovenia	
4 × 50 m medley relay (club)	1:49.21		Mandache; Șopterean; Vișan; Mușat	CS Dinamo București	8 March 1984	Unknown	Reșița, Romania	
4 × 50 m medley relay (national)	2:08.22		Satnoianu; Catarig; Nicolescu; Moldoveanu	Romania	15 April 1984	-	Baia Mare, Romania	
4 × 100 m medley relay (club)	3:40.72		Robert Glință; Andrei Cristian Roman; Alexandru Coci; Alin Coste	-	29 May 2016	Romanian Championships	Bucharest, Romania	
4 × 100 m medley relay (national)	3:35.34	h	Denis Popescu (55.02); Matei-Cristian State (1:00.77); Vlad-Stefan Mihalache (52.14); Patrick Dinu (47.41)	Romania	16 August 2026	European Championships	Paris, France	

Legend: # – Record awaiting ratification by FRNPM; ER – European record; e – equalled existing record; WJ – World Junior record;
Records not set in finals: h – heat; sf – semifinal; r – relay 1st leg; rh – relay heat 1st leg; b – B final; † – en route to final mark; so – swim-off; tt – time trial

=== Women ===
Event	Time		Name	Club	Date	Meet	Location	Ref
50m freestyle	25.28		Tamara Costache	Romania	23 August 1986	World Championships	Madrid, Spain	
100m freestyle	55.15		Rebecca Diaconescu	CSM Constanta	20 April 2024	Romanian Championships	Otopeni, Romania	
200m freestyle	1:56.87		Camelia Potec	Romania	13 August 2008	Olympic Games	Beijing, China	
400m freestyle	4:03.41		Camelia Potec	Romania	26 July 2009	World Championships	Rome, Italy	
800m freestyle	8:16.70		Camelia Potec	Romania	22 April 2009	France Championships	Montpellier, France	
1500m freestyle	15:52.37		Camelia Potec	Romania	26 April 2009	France Championships	Montpellier, France	
50m backstroke	27.94		Daria Silisteanu	Romania	8 July 2026	European Junior Championships	Munich, Germany	
50m backstroke	27.93	#	Daria Silisteanu	Romania	5 November 2026	Youth Olympic Games	Dakar, Senegal	
100m backstroke	59.63		Daria Silisteanu	CSM Constanta	22 April 2026	Romanian Championships	Otopeni, Romania	
200m backstroke	2:08.16		Diana Mocanu	Romania	18 September 2000	Olympic Games	Sydney, Australia	
50m breaststroke	31.67		Daria Asaftei	CS Dinamo București	11 April 2025	Romanian Championships	Otopeni, Romania	
100m breaststroke	1:09.23	sf	Daria Asaftei	Romania	5 July 2025	European Junior Championships	Šamorín, Slovakia	
200m breaststroke	2:25.00		Beatrice Câșlaru	Romania	25 July 2001	World Championships	Fukuoka, Japan	
50m butterfly	26.80		Denisa Bacalu	CS al Armatei Steaua Bucuresti	10 April 2025	Romanian Championships	Otopeni, Romania	
50m butterfly	26.73	not ratified	Bianca Costea	Romania	21 June 2024	Mel Zajac Jr. International Meet	Vancouver, Canada	
100m butterfly	59.12	sf	Diana Mocanu	Romania	16 September 2000	Olympic Games	Sydney, Australia	
200m butterfly	2:09.73		Stela Pura	Romania	21 May 1988	Belgium Invitational	Antwerp, Belgium	
200m individual medley	2:12.57		Beatrice Câșlaru	Romania	19 September 2000	Olympic Games	Sydney, Australia	
400m individual medley	4:37.18		Beatrice Câșlaru	Romania	16 September 2000	Olympic Games	Sydney, Australia	
4 × 50 m freestyle relay (club)	1:53.48		Ivan; Tamara Costache; Buzea; Danila	CSA Steaua București	18 December 2015	-	Pitești, Romania	
4 × 50 m freestyle relay (national)	1:45.16		Tamara Costache; Copariu; Pătrășcoiu; Dobrescu	Romania	3 February 1988	-	Hamburg, Germany	
4 × 100 m freestyle relay (club)	3:51.33		Trufașu; Georgescu; Tin; Ioana Diaconescu	LST	29 May 1996	-	Pitești, Romania	
4 × 100 m freestyle relay (national)	3:46.45		Carmen Herea (57.39); Ioana Diaconescu (56.02); Diana Mocanu (57.41); Camelia Potec (55.63)	Romania	7 July 2000	European Championships	Helsinki, Finland	
4 × 200 m freestyle relay (club)	8:16:90		Stela Pura; Lung; Tersanski; Palencsar	BAM	13 June 1987	-	Bucharest, Romania	
4 × 200 m freestyle relay (national)	8:01.63		Camelia Potec (1:59.10); Simona Păduraru (2:01.52); Ioana Diaconescu (2:01.47); Beatrice Câșlaru (1:59.54)	Romania	20 September 2000	Olympic Games	Sydney, Australia	
4 × 50 m medley relay (club)	2:03.07		Bunaciu; Pănulsescu; Mandache; Arsene	CS Dinamo București	8 August 1984	-	Reșița, Romania	
4 × 50 m medley relay (national)	2:11.96		Teodor; Cozma; Pura; Dobrescu	Romania	15 April 1984	-	Baia Mare, Romania	
4 × 100 m medley relay (club)	4:12.83		Prisecariu; Daria Asaftei; Veress; Daria Silisteanu	CS Dinamo București	13 April 2025	-	Otopeni, Romania	
4 × 100 m medley relay (national)	4:08.68		Daria Silisteanu (1:02.27); Brigitta Vass (1:10.97); Eva Paraschiv (1:00.54); Rebecca Diaconescu (54.90)	Romania	9 July 2023	European Junior Championships	Belgrade, Serbia	

Legend: # – Record awaiting ratification by FRNPM; e – equalled existing record;
Records not set in finals: h – heat; sf – semifinal; r – relay 1st leg; rh – relay heat 1st leg; b – B final; † – en route to final mark; so – swim-off; tt – time trial

=== Mixed relay ===
Event	Time		Name	Club	Date	Meet	Location	Ref
4 × 100 m freestyle relay	3:29.35	#	David Popovici (47.34); Patrick Dinu (50.03); Bianca Costea (55.47); Rebecca Diaconescu (56.51)	Romania	6 July 2022	European Junior Championships	Otopeni, Romania	
4 × 100 m medley relay	3:51.09	#	Daria Silisteanu (1:00.96); Darius Coman (1:02.50); Vlad Mihalache (52.97); Rebecca Diaconescu (54.66)	Romania	5 July 2024	European Junior Championships	Vilnius, Lithuania	

Legend: # – Record awaiting ratification by FRNPM; e – equalled existing record;
Records not set in finals: h – heat; sf – semifinal; r – relay 1st leg; rh – relay heat 1st leg; b – B final; † – en route to final mark; so – swim-off; tt – time trial

== Short course (25m) ==
=== Men ===
Event	Time		Name	Club	Date	Meet	Location	Ref
50 m freestyle	21.30	r	David Popovici	Romania	5 December 2023	European Championships	Otopeni, Romania	
100 m freestyle	45.64		David Popovici	Romania	15 December 2022	World Championships	Melbourne, Australia	
200 m freestyle	1:40.79		David Popovici	Romania	18 December 2022	World Championships	Melbourne, Australia	
400 m freestyle	3:41.06		Dragoș Coman	Romania	17 January 2004	World Cup	Berlin, Germany	
800 m freestyle	7:39.62	h	Andrei-Theodor Proca	Romania	5 December 2025	European Championships	Lublin, Poland	
1500 m freestyle	14:34.52		Vlad Stancu	Romania	7 December 2023	European Championships	Otopeni, Romania	
50m backstroke	22.74		Robert Glință	Romania	3 November 2021	European Championships	Kazan, Russia	
100m backstroke	49.31		Robert Glință	Romania	5 November 2021	European Championships	Kazan, Russia	
200m backstroke	1:51.75		Robert Glință	Team Iron	29 September 2021	International Swimming League	Naples, Italy	
50m breaststroke	26.69		Daniel Nicusan	CS Municipal Targu Mures	15 November 2024	Romanian Championships	Otopeni, Romania	
100m breaststroke	57.92	h	Danis Volontir	Romania	2 December 2025	European Championships	Lublin, Poland	
200m breaststroke	2:03.17		Darius Coman	Romania	5 December 2025	European Championships	Lublin, Poland	
50m butterfly	22.19	h	Denis Popescu	Romania	2 December 2025	European Championships	Lublin, Poland	
100m butterfly	50.97		Denis Popescu	Clubul Sportiv Olimpia Bucuresti	13 November 2025	Romanian Championships	Otopeni, Romania	
100m butterfly	50.80	not ratified	Denis Popescu	Bucharest	18 October 2025	Burgas Swims Meet	Burgas, Bulgaria	
200m butterfly	1:53.91		Ioan Gherghel	Romania	13 April 2008	World Championships	Manchester, United Kingdom	
200m butterfly	1:53.80	#	Robert Badea	Clubul Sportiv al Armatei Steaua Bucuresti	12 November 2026	Romanian Championships	Otopeni, Romania	
100m individual medley	52.45		Robert Glință	Team Iron	21 November 2021	International Swimming League	Eindhoven, Netherlands	
200m individual medley	1:54.40		Darius Coman	CSM Corona Brasov	15 November 2025	Romanian Championships	Otopeni, Romania	
400m individual medley	4:05.03		Darius Coman	CSM Corona Brasov	13 November 2025	Romanian Championships	Otopeni, Romania	
400m individual medley	4:04.35	#	Robert Badea	Clubul Sportiv al Armatei Steaua Bucuresti	11 November 2026	Romanian Championships	Otopeni, Romania	
4 × 50 m freestyle relay (club)	1:27.80		Mihai Gergely (22.41); Dragos Ghile (22.21); Andrei Ungur (21.63); Alex. Richard Szilagyi (21.55)	Clubul Sportiv Universitatea Cluj	15 November 2025	Romanian Championships	Otopeni, Romania	
4 × 50 m freestyle relay (national)	1:25.93		David Popovici (21.30); George Stoica-constantin (21.82); Mihai Gergely (21.41); Patrick Dinu (21.40)	Romania	5 December 2023	European Championships	Otopeni, Romania	
4 × 100 m freestyle relay (club)	3:28.70		Mușat; Sovar; Macovei; Vișan	CS Dinamo București	9 April 1989	Unknown	Sibiu, Romania	
4 × 100 m freestyle relay (national)	3:17.40		Răzvan Petcu; Alex Ioanovici; Nicolae Ivan; Nicolae Butacu	Romania	2 December 1995	World Championships	Rio de Janeiro, Brazil	
4 × 200 m freestyle relay (club)	7:29.49		Machița; Nicolae Ivan; Dragoș Coman; Butacu	LST	1 March 1997	Unknown	Sibiu, Romania	
4 × 200 m freestyle relay (national)	7:52.87			Romania	2 April 1982	Unknown	Hunedoara, Romania	
4 × 50 m medley relay (club)	1:36.85		Andrei Ungur (23.77); Nicolae Pcela (27.95); Alex. Richard Szilagyi (22.99); Mihai Gergely (22.14)	Clubul Sportiv Universitatea Cluj	13 November 2025	Romanian Championships	Otopeni, Romania	
4 × 50 m medley relay (national)	1:33.89		Andrei Anghel (23.78); Daniel Nicusan (26.58); Denis Popescu (22.80); Patrick Dinu (20.73)	Romania	6 December 2023	European Championships	Otopeni, Romania	
4 × 100 m medley relay (club)	3:50.58		Butacu; Ignat; Nicolae Ivan; Machița	LST	28 February 1997	Unknown	Sibiu, Romania	
4 × 100 m medley relay (national)	3:46.88		Butacu; Anastase; Petcu; Nicolae Ivan	Romania	4 December 1994	Unknown	Hunedoara, Romania	

Legend: # – Record awaiting ratification by FRNPM; e – equalled existing record;
Records not set in finals: h – heat; sf – semifinal; r – relay 1st leg; rh – relay heat 1st leg; b – B final; † – en route to final mark; so – swim-off; tt – time trial

=== Women ===
Event	Time		Name	Club	Date	Meet	Location	Ref
50m freestyle	24.77		Bianca Costea	CSA Steaua București	9 December 2021	Romanian Championships	Miercurea Ciuc, Romania	
100m freestyle	53.48		Livia Copariu	SSB	6 April 1989	-	Sibiu, Romania	
100m freestyle	53.47	#	Andreea Comna	Aqua Sport Citius București	13 November 2026	Romanian Championships	Otopeni, Romania	
200m freestyle	1:55.81		Camelia Potec	Romania	7 February 2004	World Cup	Rio de Janeiro, Brazil	
400m freestyle	4:00.62		Camelia Potec	Romania	13 December 2008	European Championships	Rijeka, Croatia	
800m freestyle	8:15.64		Camelia Potec	Romania	12 December 2008	European Championships	Rijeka, Croatia	
1500m freestyle	16:01.60		Noemi Lung	Romania	15 January 1987	-	Paris, France	
50m backstroke	26.68		Daria Silisteanu	CSM Constanța	25 October 2026	Andrei Nicolescu Cup	Otopeni, Romania	
100m backstroke	57.84		Daria Silisteanu	CS Dinamo Bucuresti	16 November 2025	Romanian Championships	Otopeni, Romania	
100m backstroke	56.49	#	Daria Silisteanu	CS Dinamo Bucuresti	12 November 2026	Romanian Championships	Otopeni, Romania	
200m backstroke	2:04.63		Aissia Prisecariu	CS Dinamo Bucuresti	15 November 2024	Romanian Championships	Otopeni, Romania	
50m breaststroke	30.93		Daria Asaftei	CS Dinamo București	13 November 2025	Romanian Championships	Otopeni, Romania	
100m breaststroke	1:06.44	h	Daria Asaftei	Romania	2 December 2025	European Championships	Lublin, Poland	
200m breaststroke	2:20.14	sf	Daria Asaftei	Romania	4 December 2025	European Championships	Lublin, Poland	
50m butterfly	26.64	h	Denisa Bacalu	CS al Armatei Steaua Bucuresti	15 November 2024	Romanian Championships	Otopeni, Romania	
100m butterfly	59.38		Denisa Bacalu	CS al Armatei Steaua Bucuresti	16 November 2024	Romanian Championships	Otopeni, Romania	
200m butterfly	2:09.34		Stela Stela Pura	Romania	8 February 1987	-	Bonn, West Germany	
100m individual medley	1:01.60	h	Andreea Comna	Aqua Sport Citius București	24 October 2026	Andrei Nicolescu Cup	Otopeni, Romania	
200m individual medley	2:10.65		Beatrice Căslaru	Romania	12 February 2000	World Cup	Paris, France	
400m individual medley	4:31.36		Noemi Lung	Romania	31 January 1987	-	Paris, France	
4 × 50 m freestyle relay (club)	1:43.54		Bianca Costea; Maysa Ratiu; Gabriela Gadea; Anastasia Bako	CSA Steaua București	10 November 2022	Romanian Championships	Otopeni, Romania	
4 × 50 m freestyle relay (national)	1:43.34		Costache; Copariu; Pătrășcoiu; Dobrescu	Romania	-	-		
4 × 50 m freestyle relay (national)	1:41.90	h, not ratified	Aissia Prisecariu (26.32); Maysa Ratiu (24.80); Ioana Știrbu (25.60); Anastasia Bako (25.18)	Romania	5 December 2023	European Championships	Otopeni, Romania	
4 × 100 m freestyle relay (club)	3:48.10		Badea; Tin; Trufașu; Ioana Diaconescu	LST	2 March 1997	-	Sibiu, Romania	
4 × 100 m freestyle relay (national)	3:44.48		Stela Pura; Copariu; Dobrescu; Costache	Romania	2 February 1988	-	Paris, France	
4 × 200 m freestyle relay (club)	8:21.60		Zgondea; Arsene; Georgescu; Pătrășcoiu	CS Dinamo București	7 April 1989	-	Sibiu, Romania	
4 × 200 m freestyle relay (national)	8:23.21			Romania	2 April 1987	-		
4 × 50 m medley relay (club)	1:52.46		Oana Sauciuc (28.67); Daria Manea (32.10); Denisa Bacalu (26.20); Ioana Știrbu (25.49)	CS al Armatei Steaua Bucuresti	17 November 2024	Romanian Championships	Otopeni, Romania	
4 × 50 m medley relay (national)								
4 × 100 m medley relay (club)	4:14.66		Badea; Tin; Gheorghe; Ioana Diaconescu	LST	2 March 1997	-	Sibiu, Romania	
4 × 100 m medley relay (national)	4:11.00		Pătrășcoiu; Costache; Copariu; Dobrescu	Romania	6 February 1998	-	Paris, France	

Legend: # – Record awaiting ratification by FRNPM; e – equalled existing record;
Records not set in finals: h – heat; sf – semifinal; r – relay 1st leg; rh – relay heat 1st leg; b – B final; † – en route to final mark; so – swim-off; tt – time trial
