= Terrance Cauthen =

American boxer

Personal information
- Nickname: Heat
- Nationality: American
- Born: May 14, 1976 (age 50) Trenton, New Jersey, U.S.
- Height: 5 ft 9 in (175 cm)
- Weight: Super lightweight Welterweight; Super welterweight Light middleweight

Boxing career
- Reach: 72 in (183 cm)
- Stance: Southpaw

Boxing record
- Total fights: 45
- Wins: 36
- Win by KO: 9
- Losses: 8
- No contests: 1

Terrance Cauthen
Medal record

Men's boxing

Representing the United States

Olympic Games
Bronze medal – third place	1996 Atlanta	Lightweight

Terrance Davin Cauthen (born May 14, 1976) is an American boxer. Nicknamed "Heat", Cauthen won the Lightweight Bronze medal at the 1996 Summer Olympics.

Cauthen grew up in Trenton, New Jersey and trained in Philadelphia.

== Amateur achievements ==
- 1995 United States Amateur Lightweight champion

Member of the 1996 US Olympic Team as a Lightweight. A Bronze Medalist, his results were:

- Round of 32:Defeated Mohamad Abdulaev of Uzbekistan- PTS (18-6)
- Round of 16:Defeated Tumentsetseg Uitumen of Mongolia – PTS (10-9)
- Quarterfinal:Defeated Pongsith Wiangwiset of Thailand – PTS (14-10)
- Semifinal:Lost to Tontcho Tontchev of Bulgaria- PTS (12-15)

== Professional career ==
Cauthen began his professional career in 1996 and built up a 15 fight winning streak heading into a 1999 showdown against the powerful Teddy Reid. Reid won via TKO in the 4th, and Cauthen set forth on an 11 fight winning streak to rebuild his credibility. This came to an abrupt end with a split decision loss to journeyman Dairo Esalas followed by a unanimous decision loss to rising star Paul Williams (boxer). Cauthen has yet to fight for a title, and another 5 fight winning streak came to end in with a loss to contender Sechew Powell in an IBF title eliminator. Following the loss to Powwll, Cauthen lost two of his next three fights.

== Professional boxing record ==
44 fights	36 wins	8 losses
By knockout	9	4
By decision	27	4

No.	Result	Record	Opponent	Type	Round, time	Date	Location	Notes
45	Loss	36–8 (1)	(United States) Ray Robinson	TKO	2 (10), 2:06	May 12, 2012	(United States) Newtown A.C., Newton Township, Pennsylvania, U.S.	For vacant USA Pennsylvania State welterweight title
44	Win	36–7 (1)	(United States) Philip McCants	UD	6	Jan 22, 2011	(United States) The Hamilton Manor, Hamilton Township, New Jersey, U.S.	
43	Loss	35–7 (1)	(Republic of Ireland) John O'Donnell	PTS	12	Sep 10, 2010	York Hall, Bethnal Green, England	
42	Win	35–6 (1)	(United States) Cleotis Pendarvis	SD	8	Jun 18, 2010	(United States) Cedar Gardens, Hamilton Township, New Jersey, U.S.	
41	Win	34–6 (1)	(Sweden) Isam Khalil	UD	8	Mar 26, 2010	(United States) The Hamilton Manor, Hamilton Township, New Jersey, U.S.	
40	Loss	33–6 (1)	(Canada) Antonin Décarie	TKO	10 (10), 2:59	Oct 3, 2009	Montreal Casino, Montreal, Quebec, Canada	
39	Loss	33–5 (1)	(United States) Shamone Alvarez	MD	10	Nov 7, 2008	(United States) Ballys Park Place Hotel Casino, Atlantic City, New Jersey, U.S.	
38	Win	33–4 (1)	(Mexico) Alexis Camacho	UD	8	Jul 16, 2008	(United States) San Antonio Municipal Auditorium, San Antonio, Texas, U.S.	
37	Loss	32–4 (1)	(United States) Sechew Powell	TKO	4 (12), 2:19	Dec 5, 2007	(United States) Seminole Hard Rock Hotel and Casino, Hollywood, Florida, U.S.	
36	ND	32–3 (1)	(Guyana) Raul Frank	ND	7 (12), 2:59	Jan 25, 2007	(United States) Paradise Theater, Bronx, New York, U.S.	Originally a TKO win for Frank, later ruled a NC after an incorrect referee decision; IBF-USBA light middleweight title was stake
35	Win	32–3	(United States) Dante Craig	TKO	10 (12)	Oct 11, 2006	(United States) Westchester County Center, White Plains, New York, U.S.	Won vacant IBF-USBA light middleweight title
34	Win	31–3	(Turkey) Nurhan Süleymanoğlu	UD	12	Jun 3, 2006	(United States) Sovereign Bank Arena, Trenton, New Jersey, U.S.	Won IBU light middleweight title
33	Win	30–3	(Kenya) Joshua Onyango	UD	8	Apr 7, 2006	(United States) The Blue Horizon, Philadelphia, Pennsylvania, U.S.	
32	Win	29–3	(United States) Vincent Thompson	TKO	8 (8), 1:21	Feb 10, 2006	(United States) The Blue Horizon, Philadelphia, Pennsylvania, U.S.	
31	Win	28–3	(Namibia) Frans Hantindi	UD	8	Oct 21, 2005	(United States) Sovereign Bank Arena, Trenton, New Jersey, U.S.	
30	Win	27–3	(United States) Joshua Smith	UD	8	Aug 26, 2005	(United States) Worlds Gym, Philadelphia, Pennsylvania, U.S.	
29	Loss	26–3	(United States) Paul Williams	UD	10	Apr 22, 2005	(United States) Chumash Casino Resort, Santa Ynez, California, U.S.	
28	Loss	26–2	(Colombia) Dairo Esalas	SD	8	Sep 24, 2004	(United States) Sovereign Bank Arena, Trenton, New Jersey, U.S.	
27	Win	26–1	(Colombia) Roberto Ortega	UD	10	Jun 25, 2004	(United States) Ramada Inn, Rosemont, Illinois, U.S.	
26	Win	25–1	(United States) Jermaine Marks	UD	12	Jan 3, 2004	(United States) Foxwoods Resort Casino, Ledyard, Connecticut, U.S.	Retained WBA-NABA and WBC-NABF super lightweight titles
25	Win	24–1	(United States) Ricky Quiles	UD	12	Aug 9, 2003	(United States) Miami Arena, Miami, Florida, U.S.	Retained WBC-NABF super lightweight title; Won vacant WBA-NABA super lightweight title
24	Win	23–1	(Colombia) Roberto Ortega	UD	12	Mar 28, 2003	(United States) Ramada Inn, Rosemont, Illinois, U.S.	Won WBC-NABF super lightweight title
23	Win	22–1	(Uganda) Franco Agentho	UD	12	Sep 6, 2002	(United States) Santa Ana Star Casino, Bernalillo, New Mexico, U.S.	Won WBC-NABF interim super lightweight title
22	Win	21–1	(Puerto Rico) Jose Aponte	UD	6	Jun 4, 2002	(United States) The Temple Corps, Philadelphia, Pennsylvania, U.S.	
21	Win	20–1	(Mexico) Sebastian Valdez	TD	4 (6), 2:40	Oct 26, 2001	(United States) Pechanga Resort & Casino, Temecula, California, U.S.	Bout ended as a TD after Valdez was cut from an accidental head clash
20	Win	19–1	(Uganda) Franco Agentho	UD	10	May 25, 2001	(United States) Mystic Lake Casino Hotel, Prior Lake, Minnesota, U.S.	
19	Win	18–1	(United States) Gary Richardson	TKO	3 (?)	Jan 5, 2001	(United States) Grand Theatre, Biloxi, Mississippi, U.S.	
18	Win	17–1	(Puerto Rico) Jose Narvaez	UD	10	Apr 7, 2000	(United States) Turning Stone Resort Casino, Verona, New York, U.S.	
17	Win	16–1	(United States) John Jones	TKO	1 (?)	Mar 4, 2000	(United States) Trenton, New Jersey, U.S.	
16	Loss	15–1	(Jamaica) Teddy Reid	TKO	4 (12), 0:57	Aug 6, 1999	(United States) Heart Banquet Center, St. Charles, Missouri, U.S.	For WBA-NABA super lightweight title
15	Win	15–0	(United States) Gary Richardson	UD	10	Mar 4, 1999	(United States) Coeur d’Alene Casino, Worley, Idaho, U.S.	
14	Win	14–0	(United States) Harold Bennett	TKO	7 (10), 3:00	Jan 22, 1999	(United States) Horseshoe Casino, Tunica Resorts, Mississippi, U.S.	
13	Win	13–0	(United States) Patrick Thorns	UD	10	Nov 13, 1998	(United States) Harrah's Cherokee Casino Resort, Cherokee, North Carolina, U.S.	
12	Win	12–0	(Canada) Andy Wong	UD	8	May 12, 1998	(United States) Corel Centre, Kanata, Ontario, Canada	
11	Win	11–0	(United States) Eugene Johnson	TKO	4 (6)	Apr 7, 1998	(United States) Harrah's Cherokee Casino Resort, Cherokee, North Carolina, U.S.	
10	Win	10–0	(United States) Richard Moore	UD	6	Feb 10, 1998	(United States) Casino Rouge, Baton Rouge, Louisiana, U.S.	
9	Win	9–0	(England) Anthony Campbell	PTS	6	Dec 6, 1997	(United States) Wembley Arena, Wembley, London, England	
8	Win	8–0	(United States) Mike Cooley	TKO	3 (?)	Oct 10, 1997	(United States) Jackpot Junction Casino Hotel, Morton, Minnesota, U.S.	
7	Win	7–0	(Mexico) Eduardo Martinez	UD	6	Sep 30, 1997	(United States) Casino Magic, Bay St. Louis, Mississippi, U.S.	
6	Win	6–0	(United States) Eldon Sneed	UD	4	Sep 2, 1997	(United States) Belle of Baton Rouge Casino, Baton Rouge, Louisiana, U.S.	
5	Win	5–0	(United States) Theon Holland	UD	4	Aug 12, 1997	(United States) The Blue Horizon, Philadelphia, Pennsylvania, U.S.	
4	Win	4–0	(United States) Fred Cannady	TKO	1 (4)	June 27, 1997	(United States) Tropicana Hotel & Casino, Atlantic City, New Jersey, U.S.	
3	Win	3–0	(United States) Jose Gonzalez	UD	4	June 6, 1997	(United States) Reading, Pennsylvania, U.S.	
2	Win	2–0	(United States) Robert Scott	KO	4 (?)	May 16, 1997	(United States) River City Events Center, Fort Smith, Arkansas, U.S.	
1	Win	1–0	(United States) Victor Miller	UD	4	Dec 14, 1996	(United States) Convention Center, Atlantic City, New Jersey, U.S.	
