= Hocine Soltani =

Algerian boxer (1972–2002)

Personal information
- Full name: Hocine Soltani
- Nationality: Algeria
- Born: December 27, 1972 Thénia, Boumerdès
- Died: March 2002 (aged 29) near Marseille, France
- Height: 1.65 m (5 ft 5 in)
- Weight: 60 kg (132 lb)

Sport
- Sport: Boxing
- Weight class: Featherweight
Medal record
Olympic Games
Gold medal – first place	1996 Atlanta	Lightweight
Bronze medal – third place	1992 Barcelona	Featherweight
World Amateur Championships
Bronze medal – third place	1991 Sydney	Featherweight
All-Africa Games
Gold medal – first place	1991 Cairo	Featherweight
Mediterranean Games
Silver medal – second place	1993 Languedoc-Roussillon	Lightweight

Hocine Soltani (December 1972 – March 2002) was an Algerian boxer, who won two Olympic medals. In 1992, the southpaw placed third in the featherweight division (54–57 kg), and at the 1996 Summer Olympics he won the gold medal in the lightweight division.

== Early life ==
Hocine Soltani was born in the Algerian town of Thénia on 27 December 1972. He was introduced to boxing by his older brother Omar, who had already trained several other fighters. Omar later explained, "It is a school of life and discipline that allowed him not to drag, he quickly proved diligent and determined." Soltani fought right-handed in the southpaw stance, using his left hand as a low guard near his hip.

== Boxing career ==
=== Amateur career ===
He came joint third with Arnaldo Mesa at the 1991 World Amateur Boxing Championships. Soltani was selected for the Olympics for the first time for the 1992 Summer Games in Barcelona, Spain, competing in the featherweight division. He reached the semi-final, where he was defeated by eventual gold medallist Andreas Tews of Germany. Omar said that "By the end of the Barcelona Olympics, the goal was to come back to win the gold this time. For us it was an even higher level. Nothing to do with the World Championships or the African Championships which was Hocine was each time medalist."

Soltani returned to the Olympics at the 1996 Summer Games in Atlanta, United States, competing this time in the lightweight division. In the first round, he defeated Turkey's Vahdettin İşsever with a points decision of 14–2. The winning margin was slightly less in the second round, when he won 11–1 against Agnaldo Nunes of Brazil. From the quarter-finals onwards, the decisions were increasingly close. Against South Korea's Shin Eun-Chul, the score was 16–10, and Soltani won in the semi-final against favourite Leonard Doroftei of Romania by a score of only 9–6.

In the final of the Atlanta Games, Soltani faced Bulgarian Tontcho Tontchev. After leading the Bulgarian 2–1 in the final round, Soltani was penalised by the referee by both his points, but soon leveled the score. With the score level at the end of the match, the victory was given to Soltani following a count back (where each hit scored by the two boxers are counted). This was the first time any Algerian had won an Olympic gold medal in boxing. No Algeria boxer would win another Olympic boxing gold medal until Imane Khelif did so in 2024.

=== Professional career ===
Hocine turned pro in 1998, and made his professional debut against Michael Jobert on 30 November 1998 at the Palais des Sports in Paris, France, winning by technical knockout. He fought twice more in France in 1999, winning against Aziz Makloufi with a points decision and then against David Sarraille with a knockout. Hocine fought for a final time on 27 January 2000, his only professional bout in Algeria, against Fabrice Colombel in a split decision. His nephew, Mebarek Soltani went on to compete for Algeria at the 2000 and 2004 Summer Olympics in boxing, but did not match his uncle's success, being unable to win any medals.

== Later life and death ==
Following his retirement from boxing following his four professional bouts, Soltani began working in the importing and exporting of cars in Marseille, where he had settled with his wife and child. He went missing on 1 March 2002, after he left to meet with a man who wanted to have two cars exported to Algeria. It was the last time he would be seen alive by his family. During the course of the next two years, there were theories that he had relocated to the United States or Japan. When a body was found in September 2004, the idea that it could be Soltani was met with skepticism by his brother, but DNA tests demonstrated that it was the missing ex-boxer.

Soltani's mother travelled to France from Algeria to provide the investigators with a baseline with which to compare the DNA evidence. The body was repatriated to Algeria, and was buried in Boudouaou. The man with whom Soltani met that day was arrested and sentenced to eight years in prison for kidnapping and the subsequent death of the victim; however, rumours continued of an underworld connection.

== Career ==
=== Olympic Games ===
- (gold) Olympic Games 1996 (Atlanta, USA) (- 60 kg )
- (bronze) Olympic Games 1992 (Barcelona, Spain) (- 57 kg )

=== World Amateur Boxing Championships ===
- (bronze) World Amateur Boxing Championships 1991 (Sydney, Australia) (- 57 kg )
- Quarter-finals World Amateur Boxing Championships 1993 (Tampere, Finland) (- 60 kg )
- Preliminaries 1/16 World Amateur Boxing Championships 1995 (Berlin, Germany) (- 63,5 kg)
- Quarter-finals World Cup 1994 (Bangkok, Thailand) (- 60 kg )

=== African Amateur Boxing Championships ===
- (gold) African Amateur Boxing Championships 1994 (Johannesburg, South Africa) (- 60 kg )
- (silver) African Olympic Qualifications 1996 (- 63,5 kg)

=== All-Africa Games ===
- (gold) All-Africa Games 1991 (Cairo, Egypt) (- 57 kg )

=== Mediterranean Games ===
- (silver) Mediterranean Games 1993 ( Narbonne, France) (- 60 kg )

=== International tournaments ===
- (gold) Italia Junior ( Santa Teresa Gallura, Italy ) 1989 (-51 kg)
- (gold) IItalia Junior( Alghero, Italy) 1990 (-51 kg)
- (gold) Balaton Junior Cup (Siofok, Hungary) 1990 (-51 kg)
- (gold) President's Cup ( Jakarta, Indonesia ) 1994 (- 60 kg )
- (gold) Golden Belt Tournament ( Bucharest, Romania) 1994 (- 60 kg )
- (gold) Trofeo Italia ( Mestre, Italy) 1995 (- 63,5 kg)
- Quarterfinals Giraldo Cordova Cardin Tournament (Camaguey, Cuba) 1996 (- 63,5 kg)
- Quarterfinals Giraldo Cordova Cardin Tournament (Cienfuegos, Cuba) 1994 (- 60 kg )

== See also ==
- List of solved missing person cases (2000s)
