= Minouche =

Minouche is a given name. Notable people with the name include:

- Minouche Barelli (1947–2004), stage name of French singer Mary-Pierre Barelli
- Minouche Shafik (born 1962), Egyptian-American economist
- Minouche Smit (born 1975), Dutch swimmer
