= Christian Giantomassi =

Italian boxer

Medal record

Representing Italy

Men's Boxing

European Amateur Championships
| Bronze medal – third place | 1996 Vejle | Lightweight |

Christian Giantomassi (born April 22, 1973 in Badia Polesine, Veneto) is a former professional boxer from Italy, who won a bronze medal in the lightweight division (– 60 kg) at the 1996 European Amateur Boxing Championships in Vejle, Denmark, alongside Vahdettin İşsever from Turkey. There he lost to Bulgaria's eventual silver medalist Tontcho Tontchev in the semifinals.

As an amateur Giantomassi was the 1994 Italian National Champion in the light welterweight division (– 63.5 kg). He represented his native country in the lightweight class at the 1996 Summer Olympics in Atlanta, Georgia, where he lost his first round match to Sergey Kopenkin of Kyrgyzstan.
