= Jaroslav Konečný =

Jaroslav Konečný may refer to:

- Jaroslav Konečný (boxer) (born 1976), Czech boxer
- Jaroslav Konečný (handballer) (1945–2017), Czechoslovak handball player
