= Francisco Martínez (boxer) =

Mexican boxer (born 1976)

Personal information
- Nationality: Mexican
- Born: 20 August 1976 (age 48)

Sport
- Sport: Boxing

Francisco Martínez (born 20 August 1976) is a Mexican boxer. He competed in the men's lightweight event at the 1996 Summer Olympics. At the 1996 Summer Olympics, he lost to Michael Strange of Canada.
