= Villalta =

Villalta is a surname of Spanish origin. Notable people with the surname include:

- Alberto Villalta (born 1947), Salvadoran footballer
- José María Villalta Florez-Estrada (born 1977) Costa Rican politician
- Luis Villalta (1969–2004), Peruvian boxer
- Miguel Villalta (born 1981), Peruvian footballer
- Renato Villalta (born 1955), Italian basketball player
