= Petcu =

Petcu is a Romanian surname. It is a Bulgarian given name, therefore a conclusion can be drawn as to the ethnic origin of Romanians having that given name as a surname. It may refer to:

- Ioan Petcu (born 1959), Romanian footballer
- Ioana Petcu-Colan (born 1978), Irish violinist of Romanian origin living in Barcelona, Spain
- Răzvan Petcu (born 1973), retired Romanian freestyle and butterfly swimmer
- Sorin Petcu (born 1974), Romanian sprint canoeist
- Ştefan Petcu (born 1957), Romanian footballer
