= Eri Yamanoi =

Japanese swimmer (born 1978)

Medal record

Representing Japan

Women's swimming

World Championships (LC)
Bronze medal – third place	2001 Fukuoka	4x200m Freestyle

Pan Pacific Championships
Bronze medal – third place	1995 Atlanta	4x100m freestyle

Summer Universiade
Gold medal – first place	1997 Catania	400m Freestyle
Bronze medal – third place	1997 Catania	800m Freestyle

Eri Yamanoi (山野井 絵理, Yamanoi Eri; born September 12, 1978 in Ibaraki) is a former freestyle swimmer from Japan, who competed for her native country at the 1996 Summer Olympics in Atlanta, United States. There she finished in fourth place in the 4 × 200 m freestyle relay, alongside Aiko Miyake, Naoko Imoto, and Suzu Chiba.

On her individual starts, in the 400m freestyle, she ended up in 7th place, clocking 4:11.68 in the final; and in tenth place in the 800m freestyle with a time of 8:40.47 (preliminary heats). A year later, Yamanoi won the gold medal in the 400 free at the Summer Universiade. In 1998, she finished third in the 800m freestyle at the Asian Games in Bangkok, Thailand.

She is a graduate of Ina Junior High School in Tsukubamirai, Ibaraki, known locally for its Olympic-size swimming pool.
