= Anke Scholz =

German swimmer

Personal information
- Full name: Anke Scholz
- Nationality: German
- Born: 25 November 1978 (age 47) Berlin
- Height: 1.82 m (6 ft 0 in)

Sport
- Sport: Swimming
- Strokes: Freestyle and backstroke
- Club: Berliner Turn- und Sportclub; Sport Gemeinschaft Coubertin
Medal record
Women's swimming
Representing Germany
Olympic Games
Silver medal – second place	1996 Atlanta	4×200 m freestyle
World Championships (LC)
Bronze medal – third place	1994 Rome	4×100 m freestyle

Anke Scholz (born 25 November 1978 in Berlin) is a retired female swimmer from Germany, specialised in the freestyle and backstroke events. She was a member of the German women's relay team that won the silver medal in the 4 × 200m freestyle event at the 1996 Summer Olympics in Atlanta, Georgia.
