= Olga Titova =

Kyrgyzstani swimmer (born 1980)

Personal information
- Born: 27 September 1980 (age 45)

Sport
- Sport: Swimming

Achievements and titles
- Olympic finals: 1996 Summer Olympics

Olga Titova (born 27 September 1980) is a Kyrgyzstani freestyle swimmer. She competed in the women's 4 × 200 metre freestyle relay event at the 1996 Summer Olympics.
