= Boxing at the 1998 Asian Games – Men's 60 kg =

Boxing competitions

Men's 60 kg at the 1998 Asian Games
- Venue: Land Sports Complex
- Date: 8–17 December 1998
- Competitors: 16 from 16 nations

Medalists
gold medal	Pongsith Wiangwiset	Thailand
silver medal	Timur Suleymanov	Uzbekistan
bronze medal	Shin Eun-chul	South Korea
bronze medal	Tümentsetsegiin Üitümen	Mongolia

The men's lightweight boxing competition at the 1998 Asian Games in Bangkok, Thailand was held from 8 to 17 December at the Land Sports Complex.

Like all Asian Games boxing events, the competition was a straight single-elimination tournament. This event consisted of 16 boxers. The competition began with the round of 16 on 8 December, where the number of competitors was reduced to 8, and concluded with the final on 17 December. Both semi-final losers were awarded bronze medals.

All bouts consisted of five three-minute rounds. The boxers receive points for every successful punch they land on their opponent's head or upper body. The boxer with the most points at the end of the bouts wins. If a boxer is knocked to the ground and cannot get up before the referee counts to 10 then the bout is over and the opponent wins.

== Schedule ==
All times are Indochina Time (UTC+07:00)

Date	Time	Event
Tuesday, 8 December 1998	14:00	Round of 16
Thursday, 10 December 1998	14:00	Quarterfinals
Monday, 14 December 1998	14:00	Semifinals
Thursday, 17 December 1998	14:00	Final

== Results ==
Legend

- KO — Won by knockout
- RSCH — Won by referee stop contest head blow
- WO — Won by walkover

Round of 16
Ram Chandra Thapa Magar (NEP)
Ikuo Iida (JPN)	RSCH
Yishake Akeremu (CHN)	4
Pongsith Wiangwiset (THA)	19
Hassan Moradnejad (IRI)	7
Joel Barriga (PHI)	8
Ruslan Mussinov (KAZ)	2
Shin Eun-chul (KOR)	10
Almazbek Raimkulov (KGZ)	4
Tümentsetsegiin Üitümen (MGL)	7
Pek Yong-chol (PRK)	WO
Ahmed Abdusahnin (PLE)
Timur Suleymanov (UZB)	KO
Souksavane Sengthavisouk (LAO)
Asghar Ali Shah (PAK)	5
Muruguthevan Balakrishnan (MAS)	2

Quarterfinals
Ikuo Iida (JPN)	6
Pongsith Wiangwiset (THA)	18
Joel Barriga (PHI)	4
Shin Eun-chul (KOR)	20
Tümentsetsegiin Üitümen (MGL)	RSCH
Pek Yong-chol (PRK)
Timur Suleymanov (UZB)	6
Asghar Ali Shah (PAK)	5

Semifinals
Pongsith Wiangwiset (THA)	14
Shin Eun-chul (KOR)	6
Tümentsetsegiin Üitümen (MGL)	3
Timur Suleymanov (UZB)	6

Final
Pongsith Wiangwiset (THA)	8
Timur Suleymanov (UZB)	2
