= Idrissa Kabore =

Burkinabé boxer (born 1977)

Personal information
- Born: 9 August 1977 (age 47)

Sport
- Sport: Boxing

Idrissa Kabore (born 9 August 1977) is a Burkinabé boxer who competed at the 1996 Summer Olympics.

Kabore was the youngest competitor to represent Burkina Faso at the 1996 Summer Olympics, he entered the lightweight division in the boxing events but lost his first round fight on points against Jaroslav Konečný from the Czech Republic.
