= Ri Chol (boxer) =

North Korean boxer (born 1976)

Personal information
- Nationality: North Korean
- Born: 29 January 1976 (age 49)

Sport
- Sport: Boxing

Ri Chol (born 29 January 1976) is a North Korean boxer. He competed in the men's lightweight event at the 1996 Summer Olympics.
