= Sergey Ostroshapkin =

Belarusian boxer (born 1976)

Personal information
- Nationality: Belarusian
- Born: 28 April 1976 (age 48)

Sport
- Sport: Boxing

Sergey Ostroshapkin (born 28 April 1976) is a Belarusian boxer. He competed in the men's lightweight event at the 1996 Summer Olympics. At the 1996 Summer Olympics, he lost to Denis Zimba of Zambia.
