= Annette Salmeen =

American swimmer

Personal information
- Full name: Annette Elizabeth Salmeen
- National team: United States
- Born: December 7, 1974 (age 51) Ann Arbor, Michigan, U.S.
- Height: 5 ft 7 in (1.70 m)

Sport
- Sport: Swimming
- Strokes: Butterfly, freestyle
- College team: University of California, Los Angeles
Medal record
Women's swimming
Representing the United States
Olympic Games
Gold medal – first place	1996 Atlanta	4×200 m freestyle
Universiade
Bronze medal – third place	1995 Fukuoka	200 m butterfly

Annette Elizabeth Salmeen (born in Ann Arbor, Michigan on December 7, 1974) is an American biochemist, a 1997 Rhodes Scholar and became a gold medalist at the 1996 Summer Olympics.

== Swimming career ==
Salmeen was a competitive swimmer by the age of 9, and became a standout swimmer at Huron High School in Ann Arbor, where she was co-captain of the girls' swimming team for two years. While at Huron, Salmeen was three-time state champion in the 500-yard freestyle, and once in the 100-yard butterfly. Salmeen went on to swim at the University of California, Los Angeles (UCLA), where she was a co-captain, four-time All-American, and an NCAA national champion in the 200-yard butterfly. She won a bronze medal in the 200-meter butterfly at the 1995 World University Games in Fukuoka, Japan. Salmeen qualified for the U.S. Olympic Team for the 1996 Summer Olympics in Atlanta, Georgia, where she earned a gold medal for swimming for the U.S. team in the preliminary heats of the women's 4×200-meter freestyle relay. In individual competition at the Olympics, she finished 4th in the B Final (12th overall) in the women's 200-meter butterfly. Salmeen was later inducted into the UCLA Athletics Hall of Fame in 2006. While at UCLA, Salmeen conducted research in a campus protein crystallography laboratory and volunteered as an assistant coach for the university's swimming team in 1997. She also expressed an interest in sharing her Olympic experiences with children.

== Rhodes Scholarship ==
Salmeen graduated from UCLA in 1997 with a Bachelor of Science in chemistry, and was awarded a Rhodes Scholarship to pursue a Doctorate of Philosophy (D.Phil.) in biochemistry at Oxford University. She was the first woman from UCLA to receive a Rhodes scholarship. During her four years at St John's College, Oxford, she was a member of the Oxford University Swimming Club, where she set three long-course records and six on the short-course.

== Stanford University ==
She earned her doctorate in 2001, and returned to the U.S. as a postdoctoral fellow at Stanford University. From 2005 to 2012, she was named to the board of the United States Anti-Doping Agency. Salmeen was also a project scientist at the DOE Joint Genome Institute before coming back to Stanford University in 2022, where she teaches and is a course coordinator in the Human Biology programme. She also teaches Health, Biology and Big Data at Stanford University. In addition to her athletic and academic work, Salmeen published important work on redox regulation of cysteine-based phosphates. She also completed a 2005 review in Antioxidants & Redox Signaling. In June 2026, she was awarded the Lloyd W. Dinkelspiel Award from Stanford University.

== See also ==
- List of Olympic medalists in swimming (women)
- List of University of California, Los Angeles people
