= Naoko Imoto =

Japanese swimmer (born 1976)

Personal information
- Full name: Naoko Imoto
- Nationality: Japan
- Born: May 20, 1976 (age 50) Aichi, Japan
- Height: 1.72 m (5 ft 8 in)
- Weight: 60 kg (132 lb)

Sport
- Sport: Swimming
- Strokes: Freestyle
Medal record
Women's swimming
Representing Japan
Pan Pacific Championships
Silver medal – second place	1991 Edmonton	4x100 m freestyle
Silver medal – second place	1991 Edmonton	4x200 m freestyle
Bronze medal – third place	1995 Atlanta	4x100 m freestyle
Asian Games
Gold medal – first place	1994 Hiroshima	50 m freestyle
Gold medal – first place	1994 Hiroshima	4x100 m freestyle
Silver medal – second place	1994 Hiroshima	100 m freestyle
Bronze medal – third place	1990 Beijing	50 m freestyle
Summer Universiade
Bronze medal – third place	1995 Fukuoka	200m Freestyle

Naoko Imoto (井本 直歩子, Imoto Naoko; born May 20, 1976) is a former freestyle swimmer from Japan, who competed for her native country at the 1996 Summer Olympics in Atlanta, Georgia. There she finished in fourth place in the 4 × 200 m freestyle relay, alongside Aiko Miyake, Eri Yamanoi, and Suzu Chiba.

In 2020, Imoto received the Olympic Flame in a ceremony in Greece to be transferred to Japan for the 2020 Summer Olympics.
