= Rebecca Diaconescu =

Romanian swimmer (born 2006)

Personal information
- Full name: Rebecca-Aimee Diaconescu
- National team: Romania
- Born: 24 April 2006 (age 20) Las Vegas, Nevada, U.S.

Sport
- Sport: Swimming
- Strokes: Freestyle
- Club: CSM Constanta
- College team: University of Michigan
- Coach: Ioana Diaconescu
Medal record
Women's swimming
Representing Romania
World Junior Championships
Silver medal – second place	2022 Lima	4×100 m mixed freestyle relay
European Junior Championships
Silver medal – second place	2022 Otopeni	4×100 m mixed freestyle relay
Silver medal – second place	2024 Vilnius	200 m freestyle

Rebecca-Aimee Diaconescu (born 24 April 2006) is a Romanian swimmer who specializes in the freestyle event. She competes at the collegiate level for the University of Michigan. She will represent Romania at the 2024 Summer Olympics.

== Early life and education ==
Diaconescu attended Palo Verde High School in Las Vegas, Nevada. In 2022, during her sophomore year, she won the Class 5A state championship in the 100 butterfly and was second in the 200 freestyle.

In January 2023, Diaconescu verbally committed to Louisville. In November 2023 she changed her commitment to Michigan for the 2024–25 season.

== Career ==
In July 2022, Diaconescu represented Romania at the 2022 European Junior Swimming Championships where she won a silver medal in the 4×100 metre mixed freestyle relay with a Romanian record time of 3:29.35. The next month she competed at the 2022 FINA World Junior Swimming Championships and won a silver medal in the 4×100 metre mixed freestyle relay.

In April 2024 at the Romanian Championships she set a Romanian record in the 100 metre freestyle with a time of 55.15, surpassing the previous record of 55.40 set by Tamara Costache in 1986. In July 2024, Diaconescu represented Romania at the 2024 European Junior Swimming Championships and won a silver medal in the 200 metre freestyle with a time of 1:58.97. She represented Romania at the 2024 Summer Olympics.

== Personal life ==
Diaconescu is the daughter of Ioana Diaconescu and Nicolae Papuc. Her mother competed in swimming at the 1996 and 2000 Summer Olympics, while her father competed in the modern pentathlon at the 2000 Summer Olympics.
