= Aiko Miyake =

Japanese swimmer

Personal information
- Born: July 6, 1978 (age 48)

Sport
- Sport: Swimming

Aiko Miyake (三宅 愛子, Miyake Aiko) (born 6 July 1978) is a former freestyle swimmer from Japan. She competed for her native country at the 1996 Summer Olympics in Atlanta, Georgia. There, she finished in fourth place in the 4x200m freestyle relay, alongside Eri Yamanoi, Naoko Imoto, and Suzu Chiba. On her sole individual start, in the 800m freestyle, she ended up in 21st place, clocking 8:55.77 in the preliminary heats.
