= Miguel Mojica =

Dominican Republic boxer (born 1975)

Personal information
- Nationality: Dominican
- Born: 28 December 1975 (age 49)

Sport
- Sport: Boxing

Miguel Mojica (born 28 December 1975) is a Dominican Republic boxer. He competed in the men's lightweight event at the 1996 Summer Olympics.
