= Nicolae Papuc =

Romanian modern pentathlete

Personal information
- Born: 6 February 1973 (age 52); Trivalea-Moșteni, Romania

Sport
- Country: Romania
- Sport: Modern pentathlon

Nicolae Papuc (born 6 February 1973) is a Romanian modern pentathlete. He represented Romania at the 2000 Summer Olympics held in Sydney, Australia in the men's modern pentathlon and he finished in 21st place.

== Personal life ==
Papuc's daughter, Rebecca Diaconescu, is an Olympic swimmer who competed at the 2024 Summer Olympics.
