= Toncho Tonchev =

Bulgarian boxer

- Born: Toncho Dimitrov Tonchev; December 1, 1972 (age 53); Sliven, Bulgaria
- Nationality: Bulgaria
- Height: 1.75 m (5 ft 9 in)
- Division: Light Welterweight (-63,5 kg)
- Stance: Orthodox
- Years active: 10 (1997–2007)

Professional boxing record
- Total: 44
- Wins: 37
- By knockout: 21
- Losses: 7
- By knockout: 4

Other information
- Boxing record from BoxRec
- Last updated on: September 22, 2009

Toncho Tonchev
Medal record

Men's Boxing

Representing Bulgaria

Olympic Games
Silver medal – second place	1996 Atlanta	Lightweight

European Amateur Championships
Silver medal – second place	1996 Vejle	Lightweight

Toncho Dimitrov Tonchev (Bulgarian: Тончо Димитров Тончев; born December 1, 1972) is a Bulgarian boxer. He won the Lightweight Silver medal at the 1996 Summer Olympics. Tonchev also represented his native country at the 1992 Summer Olympics in Barcelona, Spain.

== Amateur career ==
=== Olympic results ===
1992 Summer Olympics in Barcelona, Spain
Event	Round	Result	Opponent	Score
Lightweight	First	Win	(Cuba) Julio González Valladares	14-12
Lightweight	Second	Win	(Papua New Guinea) Henry Kungsi	11-2
Lightweight	Quarterfinals	Loss	(United States) Oscar De La Hoya	7-16

1996 Summer Olympics in Atlanta, GA, USA (United States)
Event	Round	Result	Opponent	Score
Lightweight
Lightweight	First	Win	(Moldova) Oktavian Taykou	RSC 2 (1:40)
Lightweight	Second	Win	(Zambia) Dennis Zimba	17-9
Lightweight	Quarterfinal	Win	(Canada) Michael Strange	16-10
Lightweight	Semifinal	Win	(United States) Terrance Cauthen	15-12
Lightweight	Final	Loss	(Algeria) Hocine Soltani	3-3

In 1996 he won the silver medal at the European Amateur Boxing Championships in Vejle, Denmark. Tontchev turned professional in 1997.

== Professional boxing record ==
37 Wins (21 (T)Knockouts, 16 decisions), 7 Losses (4 (T)Knockouts, 3 decisions)

Result	Record	Opponent	Type	Round, Time	Date	Location	Notes
Loss	37-7	(Republic of Ireland) Paul McCloskey	TKO	4 (12), 2:46	2007-12-08	Belfast, United Kingdom	For vacant IBF International light welterweight title
Loss	37-6	(United Kingdom) John Fewkes	PTS	8 (8)	2007-07-13	Barnsley, United Kingdom	
Loss	37-5	(Belarus) Yuri Romanov	KO	3 (12)	2007-04-28	Minsk, Belarus	For EBU (European) lightweight title
Win	37-4	(France) Frederic Gosset	TKO	1 (6)	2007-03-03	Tirana, Albania	
Win	36-4	(United Kingdom) Jon Honney	PTS	6 (6)	2006-05-26	Bethnal Green, United Kingdom	
Win	35-4	(United Kingdom) Dean Phillips	TKO	1 (8)	2006-04-02	Bethnal Green, United Kingdom	
Win	34-4	(North Macedonia) Vlado Buchkovsky	PTS	8 (8), 3:00	2005-12-23	(North Macedonia) Skopje, Macedonia	
Loss	33-4	(Hungary) Janos Nagy	Decision (Unanimous)	12 (12), 3:00	2005-09-10	Debrecen, Hungary	For International Boxing Council super featherweight title
Win	33-3	(North Macedonia) Branco Mitrevski	TKO	6 (6)	2005-08-27	(North Macedonia) Veles, Macedonia	
Loss	32-3	(Belarus) Sergey Gulyakevich	TKO	2 (12)	2005-07-20	Monte Carlo, Monaco	Losses WBA Inter-Continental lightweight title
Win	32-2	(Ukraine) Rakhim Mingaleev	TKO	4 (8)	2005-03-05	Durrës, Albania	
Win	31-2	(Belarus) Dmitry Yakubchik	Decision (Unanimous)	6 (6), 3:00	2004-06-16	Minsk, Belarus	
Win	30-2	(France) Francky Leroy	TKO	5 (12)	2004-01-31	Grande-Synthe, France	Wins vacant World Boxing Union lightweight title
Win	29-2	(Belarus) Pavel Potipko	Decision (Unanimous)	6 (6), 3:00	2003-07-05	Saint Petersburg, Russia	
Win	28-2	(Ukraine) Rakhim Mingaleev	Decision (Unanimous)	6 (6), 3:00	2003-05-24	Gravelines, France	
Loss	27-2	(Nigeria) Daniel Attah	Decision (Unanimous)	10 (10), 3:00	2002-08-03	Jersey City, New Jersey, United States	
Win	27-1	(Peru) Luis Villalta	TD	6 (10), 3:00	2002-08-03	Mashantucket, Connecticut, United States	
Win	26-1	(Mexico) Gustavo Corral	KO	6 (10), 1:28	2002-03-21	Phoenix, Arizona, United States	
Win	25-1	(Romania) Adrian Parlogea	TKO	3 (6)	2001-10-06	Sofia, Bulgaria	
Loss	24-1	(Mexico) Luis Alfonso Lizarraga	TKO	6 (10), 1:18	2001-08-21	Tempe, Arizona, United States	
Win	24-0	(Kazakhstan) Anatoly Alexandrov	TKO	1 (12), 0:38	2001-01-20	Bethnal Green, United Kingdom	Wins EBU (European) super featherweight title
Win	23-0	(United Kingdom) Charles Shepherd	Decision (Unanimous)	12 (12), 3:00	2000-11-11	Belfast, United Kingdom	Retains WBC International super featherweight title
Win	22-0	(Burkina Faso) Dramane Nabaloum	TKO	6 (12)	2000-07-13	Bethnal Green, United Kingdom	Retains WBC International super featherweight title
Win	21-0	(United States) Jimmy Zeikle	KO	2 (12)	2000-05-11	Newark-on-Trent, United Kingdom	Retains WBA Inter-Continental super featherweight title
Win	20-0	(Bulgaria) Kirkor Kirkorov	RTD	4 (12), 3:00	2000-03-25	Białystok, Poland	Wins WBC International super featherweight title
Win	19-0	(France) David Mathieu	TKO	6 (8), 0:33	2000-02-21	Southwark, United Kingdom	
Win	18-0	(Belgium) Pascal Montulet	PTS	10 (10), 3:00	1999-11-13	Cottingham, United Kingdom	
Win	17-0	(United Kingdom) Carl Allen	KO	2 (6)	1999-10-19	Bethnal Green, United Kingdom	
Win	16-0	(Hungary) Laszlo Bognar	TKO	1 (12)	1999-07-15	Peterborough, United Kingdom	Retains WBA Inter-Continental super featherweight title
Win	15-0	(Ukraine) Rakhim Mingaleev	Decision (Unanimous)	12 (12), 3:00	1999-04-29	Bethnal Green, United Kingdom	Wins WBA Inter-Continental super featherweight title
Win	14-0	(United Kingdom) Brian Coleman	PTS	6 (6), 3:00	1999-02-06	Halifax, United Kingdom	
Win	13-0	(France) Didier Schaeffer	PTS	8 (8), 3:00	1998-12-12	Chester, United Kingdom	
Win	12-0	(Czech Republic) Anatoly Vinevsky	TKO	2 (6)	1998-10-02	Wrocław, Poland	
Win	11-0	(France) Didier Tual	TKO	3 (6)	1998-08-08	Scarborough, United Kingdom	
Win	10-0	(United Kingdom) John T. Kelly	TKO	5 (8)	1998-06-09	Cottingham, United Kingdom	
Win	9-0	(United Kingdom) Anthony Campbell	PTS	8 (8), 3:00	1998-03-14	Bethnal Green, United Kingdom	
Win	8-0	(Colombia) Mauricio Bernal	KO	1 (6)	1997-12-16	Grande-Synthe, France	
Win	7-0	(United Kingdom) John T. Kelly	PTS	6 (6), 3:00	1997-11-22	Manchester, United Kingdom	
Win	6-0	(United Kingdom) Karl Taylor	PTS	4 (4), 3:00	1997-10-25	Queensferry, United Kingdom	
Win	5-0	(United Kingdom) Ervine Blake	PTS	4 (4), 3:00	1997-09-02	Southwark, United Kingdom	
Win	4-0	(Bulgaria) Sevladin Rousev	KO	2 (4)	1997-08-17	Belmeken, Bulgaria	
Win	3-0	(Democratic Republic of the Congo) Bamana Dibateza	PTS	4 (4), 3:00	1997-06-30	Bethnal Green, United Kingdom	
Win	2-0	(United Kingdom) Andrew Robinson	TKO	2 (4)	1997-05-20	Cheshunt, United Kingdom	
Win	1-0	(United Kingdom) Wayne Jones	TKO	1 (4)	1997-04-28	Cottingham, United Kingdom	Pro debut
