= Fabricio Nieva =

Argentine boxer (born 1974)

Fabricio Nieva (born July 30, 1974) is a retired lightweight boxer from Argentina, who represented his native country at the 1996 Summer Olympics in Atlanta. There he was defeated in the second round of the men's lightweight division (– 60 kg) by South Korea's Shin Eun-Chul on points (11-27). He was born in Córdoba.
