= Alexandru Ioanovici =

Romanian swimmer

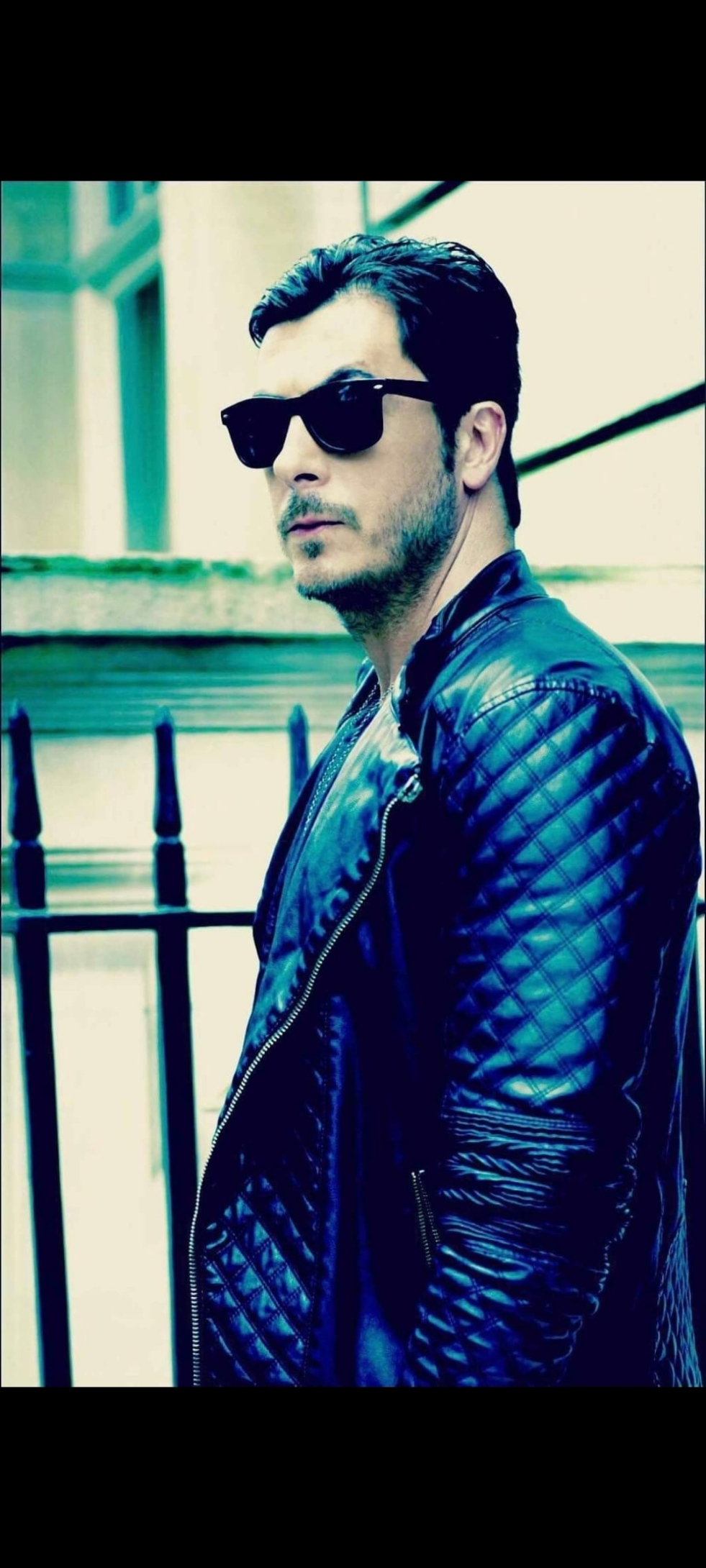

Personal information
- Full name: Alexandru Ioanovici
- Nationality: Romania
- Born: March 30, 1974 (age 52)

Sport
- Sport: Swimming
- Strokes: Freestyle
Medal record
World Championships (SC)
Bronze medal – third place	1995 Rio de Janeiro	4×100 m freestyle

Alexandru Ioanovici (born March 30, 1974) is a retired freestyle swimmer from Romania, who represented his native country at the 1996 Summer Olympics in Atlanta, Georgia. He is best known for winning the bronze medal in the men's 4×100 m freestyle relay event at the 1995 FINA Short Course World Championships in Rio de Janeiro, Brazil.
