= Jo Gwang-je =

South Korean swimmer

Personal information
- Born: 17 March 1980 (age 46)

Sport
- Sport: Swimming

Jo Gwang-je (born 17 March 1980) is a South Korean breaststroke swimmer. He competed in two events at the 1996 Summer Olympics.
