= Stela Pura =

Romanian swimmer

Personal information
- Born: 30 March 1971 (age 55) Baia Mare, Romania
- Height: 1.71 m (5 ft 7 in)
- Weight: 70 kg (150 lb)
Medal record
Representing Romania
European Championships
Silver medal – second place	1987 Strasbourg	4×200 m freestyle
Bronze medal – third place	1987 Strasbourg	400 m freestyle
Bronze medal – third place	1987 Strasbourg	200 m butterfly

Stela Marian Pura (born 30 March 1971) is a retired Romanian swimmer who won three medals at the 1987 European Aquatics Championships. She also competed in four freestyle and butterfly events at the 1988 Summer Olympics and finished fourth in the 200 m butterfly.
