= Henry Kungsi =

Papua New Guinean Olympic boxer

Personal information
- Nationality: Papua New Guinean
- Born: 1 November 1969 (age 55) Papua New Guinea
- Height: 174 cm (5 ft 9 in)
- Weight: 60 kg (132 lb)

Sport
- Country: Papua New Guinea
- Sport: Boxing

Henry Kungsi is a Papua New Guinean Olympic boxer. He represented his country in the flyweight division at the 1992 Summer Olympics. He won his first bout against Hussain Arshad of Pakistan, and then lost his second bout to Tontcho Tontchev of Bulgaria.
