= Julio Mboumba =

Gabonese boxer (born 1965)

Personal information
- Nationality: Gabonese
- Born: 1 January 1965 (age 60)

Sport
- Sport: Boxing

Julio Mboumba (born 1 January 1965) is a Gabonese boxer. He competed in the men's lightweight event at the 1996 Summer Olympics. He has been described as a "living legend of African boxing" and Gabonews described him as having "inscribed his name in the annals of national boxing".
