= Patricia Stokkers =

Dutch swimmer (born 1976)

Medal record

Representing Netherlands

Women's swimming

European Championships (LC)
Silver medal – second place	1995 Vienna	4×200 m freestyle

Patricia Stokkers (born 1 May 1976 in Utrecht) is a former freestyle swimmer from the Netherlands, who competed for her native country at the 1996 Summer Olympics in Atlanta, Georgia. There she finished in sixth position (8:08.48) with the 4×200 m freestyle relay, alongside Carla Geurts, Minouche Smit, and Kirsten Vlieghuis. A year earlier the four of them won the silver medal in the same event at the European LC Championships in Vienna, Austria.
