= Choi Cheon-sik =

South Korean volleyball player (born 1965)

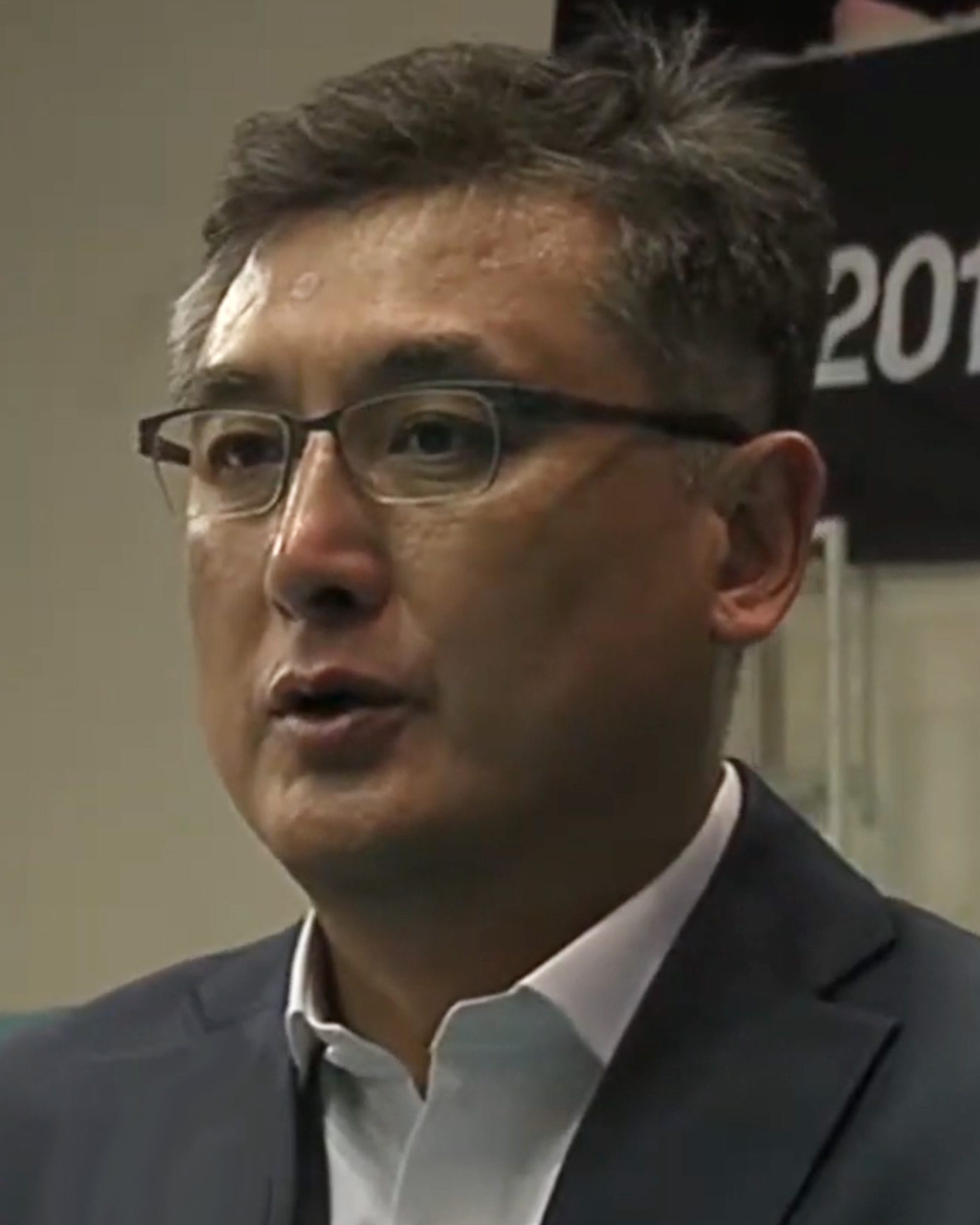
- Choi in 2018

Personal information
- Nationality: South Korean
- Born: 29 July 1965 (age 59); Not Found

Sport
- Sport: Volleyball

Choi Cheon-sik (Korean: 최천식, born 29 July 1965) is a South Korean volleyball player. He competed at the 1988 Summer Olympics and the 1996 Summer Olympics.
