= Vahdettin İşsever =

Turkish boxer (1968–2025)

Personal information
- Nationality: Turkey
- Born: 7 August 1968 Pasinler, Turkey
- Died: 8 April 2025 (aged 56) Bursa, Turkey
- Height: 1.69 m (5 ft 7 in)
- Weight: 60 kg (130 lb)

Sport
- Sport: Boxing
- Weight class: Lightweight
Medal record
European Amateur Championships
Bronze medal – third place	1996 Vejle	Lightweight

Vahdettin İşsever (7 August 1968 – 8 April 2025) was a Turkish boxer, who won the bronze medal in the Men's Lightweight (– 60 kg) division at the 1996 European Amateur Boxing Championships in Vejle, Denmark, alongside Italy's Christian Giantomassi.

İşsever represented his native country at the 1996 Summer Olympics in Atlanta, Georgia. There he was stopped in the first round of the Men's Lightweight division by Algeria's eventual gold medalist Hocine Soltani.

İşsever died in Bursa, Turkey on 8 April 2025, at the age of 56.
