= Loredana Zisu =

Romanian swimmer

Personal information
- Born: 16 January 1979 (age 46); Galați, Romania

Sport
- Sport: Swimming

Loredana Zisu (born 16 January 1979) is a Romanian butterfly and freestyle swimmer. She competed in four events at the 1996 Summer Olympics, with a best finish of seventh in the women's 4 × 200 metre freestyle relay.
