= Yang Dae-cheol =

South Korean swimmer

Personal information
- Born: 19 August 1977 (age 48)

Sport
- Sport: Swimming

Yang Dae-cheol (born 19 August 1977) is a South Korean butterfly swimmer. He competed in two events at the 1996 Summer Olympics.
