= George Maina =

Kenyan boxer

Personal information
- Nationality: Kenyan
- Born: 12 July 1974
- Died: 15 September 2002 (aged 28)

Sport
- Sport: Boxing

George Maina wairimu (12 July 1974 – 15 September 2002) was a Kenyan boxer. He competed in the men's lightweight event at the 1996 Summer Olympics.
