= Istvan Moldvai =

Romanian water polo player

Personal information
- Born: 13 April 1974 (age 50)

Sport
- Sport: Water polo

Istvan Moldvai (born 13 April 1974) is a Romanian former water polo player who competed in the 1996 Summer Olympics.
