= Seo So-yung =

South Korean swimmer

Personal information
- Born: March 2, 1981 (age 45)

Sport
- Sport: Swimming
- Strokes: Breaststroke

Seo So-yung (born 2 March 1981) is a South Korean swimmer who represented South Korea at the 1996 Summer Olympic Games.

== Career ==
She finished 41st in the women's 50 metre freestyle with a new national record of 27.30, 19th in the women's 4 × 100 metre freestyle relay and 18th in the women's 4 × 200 metre freestyle relay.
