= Park U-hui =

South Korean swimmer

Personal information
- Born: 30 May 1980 (age 46)

Sport
- Sport: Swimming

Park U-hui (born 30 May 1980) is a South Korean swimmer. She competed in three events at the 1996 Summer Olympics.
