= Shin Eun-chul =

South Korean boxer (born 1973)

Personal information
- Born: December 26, 1973 (age 52)
- Height: 173 cm (5 ft 8 in)
- Weight: 60 kg (132 lb)

Sport
- Sport: Amateur boxing
- Weight class: Lightweight
Medal record
Men's boxing
Representing South Korea
World Amateur Championships
Bronze medal – third place	1997 Budapest	Lightweight (-60 kg)
Asian Amateur Championships
Silver medal – second place	1997 Kuala Lumpur	Lightweight (-60 kg)
Asian Games
Bronze medal – third place	1998 Bangkok	Lightweight (-60 kg)

Shin Eun-Chul (Korean: 신은철, also transliterated Sin Eun-Cheol; born December 26, 1973) is a retired South Korean amateur boxer.

== Career ==
Lee won a bronze medal in the men's lightweight (60 kg) division at the 1997 World Amateur Boxing Championships in Budapest.

== Results ==
1996 Olympic Games
Event	Round	Result	Opponent	Score
Lightweight	First	Win	(Kenya) George Maina	RSC 3
Lightweight	Second	Win	(Argentina) Fabrizio Nieva	27-11
Lightweight	Quarterfinal	Loss	(Algeria) Hocine Soltani	10-16

1997 World Championships
Event	Round	Result	Opponent	Score
Lightweight	First	bye		
Lightweight	Second	Win	(Lithuania) Askanijas Milkitas	RSC 2
Lightweight	Third	Win	(Argentina) Javier Álvarez	+3-3
Lightweight	Quarterfinal	Win	(Kazakhstan) Ruslan Musinov	13-6
Lightweight	Semifinal	Loss	(Russia) Alexandr Maletin	2-15
