= Mekhak Ghazaryan =

Armenian boxer (born 1966)

Personal information
- Full name: Մեխակ Ղազարյան
- Nationality: Armenia
- Born: December 13, 1966 (age 59) Gyumri, Shirak, Armenian SSR, Soviet Union
- Height: 1.65 m (5 ft 5 in)
- Weight: 57 kg (126 lb)

Sport
- Sport: Boxing
- Weight class: Lightweight
Medal record
European Amateur Championships
Representing Soviet Union
Gold medal – first place	1987 Turin	Featherweight
Representing Armenia
Bronze medal – third place	1993 Bursa	Lightweight

Mekhak Ghazaryan (Armenian: Մեխակ Ղազարյան; born December 13, 1966, in Gyumri, Shirak), also known as Mikhail Kazaryan, is a retired amateur boxer from Armenia. He represented the Soviet Union at the 1988 Summer Olympics in Seoul, South Korea in the men's featherweight (57 kg) division. Ghazaryan was defeated in the third round by eventual gold medalist Giovanni Parisi. He represented his native country at the 1996 Summer Olympics in Atlanta, Georgia, in the men's lightweight (60 kg) division. Ghazaryan lost in the second round to Michael Strange.

Ghazaryan won the European Championship title in the lightweight division at the 1987 European Amateur Boxing Championships in Turin. Ghazaryan won a bronze medal at the 1993 European Amateur Boxing Championships in the lightweight division.
