= Dinel Stemate =

Romanian water polo player

Personal information
- Born: 14 March 1968 (age 57); Caracal, Romania

Sport
- Sport: Water polo

Dinel Stemate (born 14 March 1968) is a Romanian former water polo player who competed in the 1996 Summer Olympics.
