= Lee Gyu-chang =

South Korean swimmer (born 1979)

Personal information
- Born: 21 May 1979 (age 47)

Sport
- Sport: Swimming

Lee Gyu-chang (born 21 May 1979) is a South Korean freestyle swimmer. He competed in two events at the 1996 Summer Olympics.
