= Jaroslav Konečný (boxer) =

Czech boxer

Personal information
- Nationality: Czech
- Born: 18 September 1976 (age 50) Karlovy Vary, Czechoslovakia

Sport
- Sport: Boxing

Jaroslav Konečný (born 18 September 1976) is a Czech boxer. He competed in the men's lightweight event at the 1996 Summer Olympics.
