= Luis Villalta =

Peruvian boxer

Luis Villalta Aquino (October 2, 1969 in Lima, Peru – March 3, 2004 in Pompano Beach, Florida) was a professional boxer, who was nicknamed "El Puma" during his career.

He moved to Hillsborough Township, New Jersey to be near his trainer and improve his career opportunities while trying to get entry visas for his family. He shared an apartment with two roommates and worked at a local McDonald's.

On February 28, 2004, he defended his North American Boxing Association lightweight title against Ricky Quiles at the Seminole Tribe of Florida Coconut Creek Casino. He collapsed in his dressing room moments after losing. Villalta was rushed to the North Broward Medical Center. He died after undergoing surgery for head trauma. His wife, Miraebel, and father, Luis, Sr. who were granted emergency visas, were at his bedside. He never regained consciousness.

Villalta is the fifth Peruvian fighter to die in the ring. His career record was 29-6-1.
