= Agnaldo Nunes =

Brazilian boxer

Personal information
- Born: 7 November 1976 (age 49) Piracicaba, Brazil
- Height: 1.70 m (5 ft 7 in)
- Weight: Super featherweight

Boxing career
- Reach: 169 cm (67 in)
- Stance: Southpaw

Boxing record
- Total fights: 21
- Wins: 19
- Win by KO: 8
- Losses: 1
- Draws: 0
- No contests: 1

Agnaldo Nunes Magalhães (born 7 November 1976) is a Brazilian professional boxer. As an amateur, he represented his native country twice in the lightweight division at the 1996 and 2000 Summer Olympics.
