= Michael Strange (boxer) =

Canadian boxer

Personal information
- Full name: Michael Vincent Strange
- Born: August 6, 1970 (age 56) Niagara Falls, Ontario, Canada

Sport
- Sport: Boxing
Medal record
Men's amateur boxing
Representing Canada
Pan American Games
Bronze medal – third place	1995 Mar del Plata	Lightweight
Commonwealth Games
Gold medal – first place	1994 Victoria	Lightweight
Gold medal – first place	1998 Kuala Lumpur	Light welterweight

Michael Vincent "Mike" Strange (born August 6, 1970) is a Canadian Politician, philanthropist and former amateur boxer. As an amateur boxer, he competed at three consecutive Summer Olympics as a light welterweight (< 64 kg), starting in 1992 in Barcelona, Spain.

== Boxing career ==
Strange started boxing at the age of 10 and started taking the sport seriously when he saw two of his idols in the 1984 Olympics win two silver medals for Canada (Willie deWit and Shawn O'Sullivan). Strange's dream was to compete for Canada at the Olympic Games and his dream came true three times as he competed in three consecutive Summer Olympic Games in 1992, 96, and 2000. Strange had over 350 amateur bouts and won gold medals at the 1994 and 1998 Commonwealth Games in Canada and Malaysia, respectively. Strange was also the first Canadian boxer to be named the Flag Bearer for Team Canada at the closing ceremonies in Malaysia. Mike was named the "Canadian boxer of the year" in 1996 and in 1998.

=== Amateur results ===
1992 Olympic Games (as a Featherweight)

- Lost to Somluck Kamsing (Thailand) 9–11

1994 Commonwealth Games (as a Lightweight)

- Defeated Emmanuel Clottey (Ghana) 29–3
- Defeated Irvin Buhlalu (South Africa) 8–7
- Defeated Hassan Matumla (Tanzania) 11–6
- Defeated Kalolo Fiaui (New Zealand) 12–2
- Defeated Martin Renaghan (Ireland) 18–11

1995 Pan American Games (as a Lightweight)

- Defeated Benjamin Bucio (Mexico) 4–2
- Defeated Franklin Frias (Dominican Republic) 11–6
- Lost to Julio González (Cuba) 2–13

1996 Olympic Games (as a Lightweight)

- Defeated Francisco Martínez (Mexico) 15–1
- Defeated Mekhak Ghazaryan (Armenia) 16–7
- Lost to Tontcho Tontchev (Bulgaria) 10–16

1998 Commonwealth Games (as a Light Welterweight)

- Defeated Hassan Matumla (Tanzania) 21–7
- Defeated Kloba Sehloho (Lesotho) 21–1
- Defeated Davis Mwale (Zambia) 19–1
- Defeated Gerry Legras (Seychelles) 16–8

2000 Olympic Games (as a Light Welterweight)

- Lost to Nurhan Süleymanoğlu (Turkey) 3–9

== Philanthropic Endeavours ==
To raise money for cancer awareness, Strange started the Box Run. He began running from Thunder Bay, Ontario towards Victoria, British Columbia on April 12, 2012. He ran for 81 days at an average of over 40 km per day finishing his run on July 3, 2012, in Victoria at Mile Zero, 3,149 km later. The Box Run raised over $100,000 for Childhood Cancer Canada. Shoes worn during this run are currently on display at the Niagara Falls History Museum.

In 2014, the Box Run became an official registered charity. It is a completely volunteer-based organization focused on raising funds through athletic endeavours.

On May 8, 2014, Strange embarked on another run for childhood cancer. Dubbed the "90 in 90", Strange ran 94 Marathons in 94 days from St. John's Newfoundland to his hometown of Niagara Falls. The run was in honor of 12-year old Matteo Mancini, Strange's inspiration from his first Box Run who lost his battle to cancer on May 8, 2013.

In August 2016, Strange and three teammates set out on the "Box Climb". The troop summited the Breithorn, a mountain peak adjacent to the Matterhorn in Switzerland.

In September 2018, to commemorate Childhood Cancer Awareness month, Strange set out on the Camino de Santiago, an 800 km spiritual journey through Spain. Each of the 30 days was dedicated to a child who has fought or is fighting cancer.

Over the course of 30 days starting in August 2023 Strange and fellow councilperson Victor Pietrangelo ran 1000 km of the Bruce Trail to raise funds raise funds for childhood cancer research and the Ronald McDonald House in Hamilton

Strange started the Heaters Hero's charity event to raise funds and awareness of childhood cancers. The annual event is held each year at Oakes Park.

== Politics ==
In 2014, Strange was elected to Niagara Falls City Council. In July 2017, Strange filed his papers to seek the Progressive Conservative Party of Ontario nomination in the 2018 general election, contesting Niagara Falls. Strange was re-elected to Niagara Falls City Council in 2018, and ran as an independent in the riding of Niagara Falls in the 2019 Canadian federal election.

in 2022, Strange was reelected to the Niagara Falls City Council. Strange received the most votes out of any other candidate.

== Personal life ==
Strange previously owned the "Highland Tap" pub in Niagara Falls, Ontario for 21 years.

In May 2025, Strange was charged with assault on a woman and released from the St. Catharines courthouse the same day with conditions. (

In April 2026, the case went to trial.

The judge accepted the victim’s testimony as truthful and specifically stated that he did not believe she was lying, while expressing concerns about aspects of the accused’s account. However, gaps in the victim’s recollection left sufficient reasonable doubt to prevent the Crown from meeting the criminal standard of proof, resulting in a not-guilty verdict.

Strange was acquitted on grounds of reasonable doubt, despite the judge having found the victim credible.

https://www.stcatharinesstandard.ca/news/niagara-region/niagara-falls-city-councillor-charged-with-assault/article_3232cb7d-509a-5c43-b798-24b3f298edf2.html)
