= Minouche Smit =

Dutch swimmer (born 1975)

Personal information
- Born: 6 March 1975 (age 51) Hoorn, the Netherlands

Sport
- Sport: Swimming
- Club: De Water Kip, Barneveld
Medal record
Representing the Netherlands
European Championships (LC)
Silver medal – second place	1995 Vienna	4×200 m freestyle

Minouche Smit (born 6 March 1975) is a former freestyle and medley swimmer from the Netherlands. At the 1996 Summer Olympics in Atlanta, Georgia, she finished in sixth position (8:08.48) with the 4×200 m freestyle relay, alongside Carla Geurts, Patricia Stokkers, and Kirsten Vlieghuis. A year earlier the four of them won the silver medal in the same event at the European LC Championships in Vienna, Austria. In Atlanta Smit was also on the women's relay team, that ended up in fourth place (3:42.40) in the 4×100 m freestyle, together with Marianne Muis, Wilma van Hofwegen, and Karin Brienesse. In her only individual start, in the 200 m individual medley, she finished in seventh position, clocking 2:16.73.

Smit was married to the Dutch swimming star Pieter van den Hoogenband. They have two children. In September 2012 the couple announced their separation.
