= Tümentsetsegiin Üitümen =

Mongolian boxer (born 1971)

Personal information
- Native name: Түмэнцэцэгийн Үйтүмэн
- Nationality: Mongolian
- Born: Tümentsetsegiin Üitümen; 22 February 1971 (age 55)
- Height: 170 cm (5 ft 7 in)
- Weight: 68 kg (150 lb)

Sport
- Sport: Boxing
- Weight class: Lightweight (-60 kg)
Medal record
Men's amateur boxing
Representing Mongolia
World Amateur Championships
Silver medal – second place	1997 Budapest	Lightweight
Asian Games
Bronze medal – third place	1998 Bangkok	Lightweight
Asian Amateur Championships
Gold medal – first place	1995 Tashkent	Lightweight

Tümentsetsegiin Üitümen (born 22 February 1971) is a Mongolian boxer. He competed at the 1996 Summer Olympics and the 2000 Summer Olympics.
