= Sergey Kopenkin =

Kyrgyzstani boxer

Personal information
- Nationality: Kyrgyzstani
- Born: 26 November 1971 (age 53)

Sport
- Sport: Boxing

Sergey Kopenkin (born 26 November 1971) is a Kyrgyzstani former boxer. He competed in the men's lightweight event at the 1996 Summer Olympics.
