= Jeong On-ra =

South Korean swimmer

Personal information
- Full name: 정온라
- Born: 19 May 1982 (age 44)

Sport
- Sport: Swimming
- Strokes: freestyle

Jeong On-ra (Korean: 정온라, born 19 May 1982) is a South Korean freestyle swimmer. She competed in three events at the 1996 Summer Olympics.
