= Lee Jie-hyun =

South Korean swimmer (born 1979)

Personal information
- Born: 16 October 1979 (age 46)

Korean name
- Hangul: 이지현
- Hanja: 李知炫
- RR: I Jihyeon
- MR: I Chihyŏn

Sport
- Sport: Swimming
- Strokes: freestyle, medley
Medal record
Women's swimming
Representing South Korea
Asian Games
Bronze medal – third place	1994 Hiroshima	4×100 m freestyle

Lee Jie-hyun (Korean: 이지현; born 16 October 1979) is a South Korean swimmer. She competed in four events at the 1996 Summer Olympics.

She was educated at Gawon Middle School, Kyunggi Girls' High School, and UCLA.
