= Franco Agentho =

Ugandan boxer

Personal information
- Nationality: Ugandan
- Born: 2 August 1973 (age 51)
- Weight: 60 kg (130 lb)

Sport
- Sport: Boxing

Franco Agentho (born 2 August 1973) is a Ugandan boxer. He competed in the 1996 Summer Olympics.
