= Ioana Diaconescu =

Romanian swimmer

Personal information
- Born: 30 June 1979 (age 46)
Medal record
Women's swimming
Representing Romania
European Championships (LC)
Gold medal – first place	2000 Helsinki	4 × 200 m freestyle
Summer Universiade
Gold medal – first place	1999 Mallorca	100 m freestyle
Silver medal – second place	1999 Mallorca	200 m freestyle

Ioana Lorena Diaconescu (born 30 June 1979, in Bucharest) is a former Romanian freestyle swimmer. She represented her native country at the 1996 and 2000 Summer Olympics.

== Career ==
In 2000, at the European LC Championships in Helsinki, Finland, she was on the women's relay team, that won the gold medal in the 4×200 m freestyle.

== Personal life ==
Diaconescu's daughter, Rebecca Diaconescu, is also an Olympic swimmer who competed at the 2024 Summer Olympics.
