= Răzvan Petcu =

Romanian swimmer

Personal information
- Full name: Răzvan Petcu
- Nationality: Romania
- Born: May 10, 1973 (age 53)

Sport
- Sport: Swimming
- Strokes: butterfly and freestyle
Medal record
World Championships (SC)
| Bronze medal – third place | 1995 Rio de Janeiro | 4×100 m freestyle |

Răzvan Petcu (born May 10, 1973) is a retired freestyle and butterfly swimmer from Romania, who represented his native country at the 1996 Summer Olympics in Atlanta, Georgia. He is best known for winning the bronze medal in the men's 4×100 m freestyle relay event at the 1995 FINA Short Course World Championships in Rio de Janeiro. He now lives in Charlotte, North Carolina.
