= Swimming at the 2020 European Aquatics Championships – Men's 4 × 100 metre medley relay =

Men's 4 × 100 metre medley relay at the 2020 European Aquatics Championships
- Venue: Danube Arena
- Dates: 23 May 2021
- Competitors: 90 from 20 nations
- Teams: 20
- Winning time: 3:28.59

Medalists
gold medal	Luke Greenbank; Adam Peaty; James Guy; Duncan Scott; Joe Litchfield; James Wilby; Thomas Dean	Great Britain
silver medal	Kliment Kolesnikov; Kirill Prigoda; Mikhail Vekovishchev; Andrey Minakov; Evgeny Rylov; Anton Chupkov; Alexander Kudashev; Aleksandr Shchegolev	Russia
bronze medal	Thomas Ceccon; Nicolò Martinenghi; Federico Burdisso; Alessandro Miressi; Alessandro Pinzuti; Piero Codia	Italy

The Men's 4 × 100 metre medley relay competition of the 2020 European Aquatics Championships was held on 23 May 2021.

== Records ==
Before the competition, the existing world, European and championship records were as follows.

	Team	Time	Location	Date
World record	United States	3:27.28	Rome	2 August 2009
European record	Great Britain	3:28.10	Gwangju	28 July 2019
Championship record	Great Britain	3:30.44	Glasgow	9 August 2018

The following new records were set during this competition.

Date	Event	Nation	Time	Record
23 May	Final	Great Britain	3:28.59	CR

== Results ==
=== Heats ===
The heats were started at 10:54.

Rank	Heat	Lane	Nation	Swimmers	Time	Notes
1	2	8	Great Britain	Joe Litchfield (54.09); James Wilby (58.90); Duncan Scott (51.43); Thomas Dean (48.06)	3:32.48	Q
2	2	7	France	Yohann Ndoye Brouard (52.96); Theo Bussiere (1:00.30); Mehdy Metella (51.26); Maxime Grousset (47.98)	3:32.50	Q
3	1	3	Italy	Thomas Ceccon (53.69); Alessandro Pinzuti (59.60); Piero Codia (52.13); Alessandro Miressi (48.05)	3:33.47	Q
4	1	0	Poland	Kacper Stokowski (54.42); Jan Kozakiewicz (1:00.41); Paweł Korzeniowski (51.54); Jakub Kraska (48.16)	3:34.53	Q
5	1	1	Ireland	Shane Ryan (54.11); Darragh Greene (58.98); Brendan Hyland (52.85); Jack McMillan (48.68)	3:34.62	Q, NR
6	1	9	Russia	Evgeny Rylov (53.44); Anton Chupkov (58.94); Alexander Kudashev (53.49); Aleksandr Shchegolev (48.85)	3:34.72	Q
7	2	0	Belarus	Viktar Staselovich (54.92); Ilya Shymanovich (58.20); Yauhen Tsurkin (52.21); Artsiom Machekin (49.54)	3:34.87	Q
8	1	4	Germany	Björn Kammann (55.38); Lucas Matzerath (59.11); Ramon Klenz (52.25); Josha Salchow (48.26)	3:35.00	Q
9	2	3	Lithuania	Danas Rapšys (55.14); Andrius Šidlauskas (59.23); Deividas Margevičius (52.29); Simonas Bilis (48.82)	3:35.48	
10	2	5	Hungary	Benedek Kovács (54.78); Tamás Takács (1:01.18); Hubert Kós (52.22); Nándor Németh (47.87)	3:36.05	
11	1	7	Sweden	Gustav Hökfelt (55.29); Erik Persson (59.72); Simon Sjödin (52.28); Isak Eliasson (48.87)	3:36.16	
12	1	5	Austria	Bernhard Reitshammer (55.12); Christopher Rothbauer (1:01.67); Simon Bucher (51.80); Heiko Gigler (48.03)	3:36.62	NR
13	2	9	Turkey	Berke Saka (55.73); Berkay-Ömer Öğretir (58.86); Ümitcan Güreş (52.31); Baturalp Ünlü (49.99)	3:36.89	
14	2	1	Greece	Apostolos Christou (53.71); Konstantinos Meretsolias (1:00.01); Stefanos Dimitriadis (54.38); Andreas Vazaios (48.96)	3:37.06	
15	2	4	Bulgaria	Kaloyan Levterov (55.89); Lyubomir Epitropov (1:00.13); Josif Miladinov (52.29); Antani Ivanov (49.17)	3:37.48	NR
16	1	8	Estonia	Armin Evert Lelle (55.21); Martin Allikvee (1:01.81); Alex Ahtiainen (52.43); Daniel Zaitsev (48.31)	3:37.76	NR
17	2	2	Czech Republic	Jan Čejka (54.31); Matěj Zábojník (1:01.84); Jan Šefl (52.30); Adam Hlobeň (49.82)	3:38.27	
18	1	2	Norway	Markus Lie (55.68); André Klippenberg Grindheim (1:00.36); Tomoe Zenimoto Hvas (52.98); Nicholas Lia (49.50)	3:38.52	NR
19	2	6	Slovakia	Alex Kušík (58.43); Tomáš Klobučník (1:02.22); Ádám Halás (53.80); Matej Duša (50.17)	3:44.62	NR
	1	6	Switzerland	Roman Mityukov (54.55); Jérémy Desplanches (1:01.24); Noè Ponti (52.12); Antonio Djakovic	Disqualified	

=== Final ===
The final was held at 19:14.

Rank	Lane	Nation	Swimmers	Time	Notes
1st place, gold medalist(s)	4	Great Britain	Luke Greenbank (53.64); Adam Peaty (57.38); James Guy (50.65); Duncan Scott (46.92)	3:28.59	CR
2nd place, silver medalist(s)	7	Russia	Kliment Kolesnikov (52.13); Kirill Prigoda (59.02); Mikhail Vekovishchev (50.94); Andrey Minakov (47.41)	3:29.50	
3rd place, bronze medalist(s)	3	Italy	Thomas Ceccon (53.59); Nicolò Martinenghi (57.84); Federico Burdisso (51.29); Alessandro Miressi (47.21)	3:29.93	NR
4	6	Poland	Kacper Stokowski (54.18); Jan Kozakiewicz (59.34); Jakub Majerski (51.11); Jakub Kraska (48.19)	3:32.82	NR
5	5	France	Yohann Ndoye Brouard (53.22); Théo Bussière (1:00.60); Mehdy Metella (51.46); Maxime Grousset (47.82)	3:33.10	
6	1	Belarus	Viktar Staselovich (54.75); Ilya Shymanovich (57.84); Yauhen Tsurkin (51.93); Artsiom Machekin (49.68)	3:34.20	
7	2	Ireland	Shane Ryan (54.23); Darragh Greene (59.20); Brendan Hyland (53.08); Jack McMillan (48.37)	3:34.88	
8	8	Germany	Björn Kammann (55.42); Lucas Matzerath (58.95); Ramon Klenz (52.09); Josha Salchow (48.81)	3:35.27	
