= Swimming at the 2018 European Aquatics Championships – Mixed 4 × 100 metre medley relay =

Mixed 4 × 100 metre medley relay at the 2018 European Aquatics Championships
- Venue: Tollcross International Swimming Centre
- Dates: 6 August
- Competitors: 85 from 18 nations
- Teams: 18
- Winning time: 3:40.18

Medalists
gold medal	Georgia Davies; Adam Peaty; James Guy; Freya Anderson; Nicholas Pyle; Charlotte Atkinson	Great Britain
silver medal	Kliment Kolesnikov; Yuliya Yefimova; Svetlana Chimrova; Vladimir Morozov; Grigoriy Tarasevich; Ilya Khomenko; Viktoriya Andreeva; Maria Kameneva	Russia
bronze medal	Margherita Panziera; Fabio Scozzoli; Elena Di Liddo; Alessandro Miressi; Matteo Restivo; Arianna Castiglioni; Luca Dotto	Italy

The Mixed 4 × 100 metre medley relay competition of the 2018 European Aquatics Championships was held on 6 August 2018.

== Records ==
Prior to the competition, the existing world and championship records were as follows.

	Team	Time	Location	Date
World record	United States	3:38.56	Budapest	26 July 2017
European record	Great Britain	3:41.56	Budapest	26 July 2017
Championship record	Great Britain	3:44.02	Berlin	19 August 2014

The following new records were set during this competition.

Date	Event	Nation	Time	Record
6 August	Final	Great Britain	3:40.18	CR, ER

== Results ==
=== Heats ===
The heats were started at 10:36.

Rank	Heat	Lane	Nation	Smimmers	Time	Notes
1	1	8	Netherlands	Maaike de Waard (1:01.08); Arno Kamminga (59.06); Joeri Verlinden (51.78); Ranomi Kromowidjojo (53.42)	3:45.34	Q
2	1	3	Germany	Jenny Mensing (1:00.41); Fabian Schwingenschlögl (59.84); Marius Kusch (51.69); Annika Bruhn (54.28)	3:46.22	Q
3	1	4	Russia	Grigoriy Tarasevich (53.22); Ilya Khomenko (59.57); Viktoriya Andreeva (59.68); Maria Kameneva (53.98)	3:46.45	Q
4	2	1	Great Britain	Nicholas Pyle (54.50); Adam Peaty (58.49); Charlotte Atkinson (59.90); Freya Anderson (54.55)	3:47.44	Q
5	2	6	Italy	Matteo Restivo (55.14 ) Arianna Castiglioni (1:06.32); Elena Di Liddo (57.76); Luca Dotto (48.51)	3:47.73	Q
6	2	5	Poland	Kacper Stokowski (55.21); Marcin Stolarski (1:00.40); Anna Dowgiert (59.47); Katarzyna Wasick (54.43)	3:49.51	Q
7	1	6	Sweden	Gustav Hökfelt (55.43); Johannes Skagius (1:00.26); Louise Hansson (57.95); Magdalena Kuras (55.94)	3:49.58	Q
8	1	5	Switzerland	Thierry Bollin (55.37); Yannick Käser (1:00.43); Svenja Stoffel (1:00.01); Maria Ugolkova (54.05)	3:49.86	Q
9	1	7	Israel	David Gamburg (55.71); Itay Goldfaden (1:02.18); Amit Ivry (58.77); Andrea Murez (54.23)	3:50.89	
10	2	2	Belgium	Emmanuel Vanluchene (56.32); Basten Caerts (1:00.32); Kimberly Buys (58.39); Juliette Dumont (56.19)	3:51.22	
11	2	3	Lithuania	Gytis Stankevičius (55.10); Kotryna Teterevkova (1:08.74); Deividas Margevičius (52.41); Rūta Meilutytė (55.60)	3:51.85	
12	2	8	Belarus	Mikita Tsmyh (55.14); Ilya Shymanovich (59.15); Anastasiya Kuliashova (1:00.73); Yuliya Khitraya (57.13)	3:52.15	
13	2	7	Estonia	Karl Johann Luht (55.88); Maria Romanjuk (1:09.51); Daniel Zaitsev (53.11); Kertu Ly Alnek (56.40)	3:54.90	
14	1	1	Austria	Bernhard Reitshammer (55.47); Christopher Rothbauer (1:01.76); Claudia Hufnagl (1:02.07); Lena Kreundl (55.70)	3:55.00	
15	1	0	Turkey	Metin Aydın (55.85); Berkay Ömer Öğretir (1:01.51); Nida Eliz Üstündağ (1:02.20); Selen Özbilen (56.11)	3:55.67	
16	2	4	Latvia	Ģirts Feldbergs (55.96); Daniils Bobrovs (1:01.62); Gabriela Ņikitina (1:05.45); Ieva Maļuka (56.01)	3:59.04	
17	1	2	Slovakia	Adam Černek (58.20); Tomáš Klobučník (1:00.82); Andrea Podmaníková (1:03.37); Laura Benková (57.34)	3:59.73	
	2	0	Hungary	Gábor Balog (54.59); Anna Sztankovics (1:08.46); Evelyn Verrasztó (1:00.41); Dominik Kozma	Disqualified	

=== Final ===
The final was held at 18:22.

Rank	Lane	Nation	Swimmers	Time	Notes
1st place, gold medalist(s)	6	Great Britain	Georgia Davies (59.12); Adam Peaty (57.27); James Guy (50.96); Freya Anderson (52.83)	3:40.18	ER, CR
2nd place, silver medalist(s)	3	Russia	Kliment Kolesnikov (52.51); Yuliya Yefimova (1:05.07); Svetlana Chimrova (57.30); Vladimir Morozov (47.83)	3:42.71	NR
3rd place, bronze medalist(s)	2	Italy	Margherita Panziera (1:00.11); Fabio Scozzoli (59.46); Elena Di Liddo (57.68); Alessandro Miressi (47.60)	3:44.85	NR
4	4	Netherlands	Kira Toussaint (1:00.33); Arno Kamminga (1:00.89); Joeri Verlinden (51.37); Ranomi Kromowidjojo (52.98)	3:45.57	
5	5	Germany	Jenny Mensing (1:00.91); Fabian Schwingenschlögl (59.65); Marius Kusch (51.41); Annika Bruhn (53.85)	3:45.82	
6	7	Poland	Alicja Tchórz (1:00.94); Marcin Stolarski (1:00.14); Michał Chudy (52.57); Katarzyna Wasick (54.07)	3:47.72	NR
7	8	Switzerland	Thierry Bollin (54.81); Yannick Käser (1:00.46); Svenja Stoffel (59.46); Maria Ugolkova (53.53)	3:48.26	NR
8	1	Sweden	Gustav Hökfelt (54.71); Johannes Skagius (1:00.40); Louise Hansson (58.01); Ida Lindborg (55.41)	3:48.53	NR
