= Swimming at the 2020 European Aquatics Championships – Men's 100 metre breaststroke =

Men's 100 metre breaststroke at the 2020 European Aquatics Championships
- Venue: Danube Arena
- Dates: 17 May 2021 (heats and semifinals); 18 May 2021 (final)
- Competitors: 66 from 31 nations
- Winning time: 57.66

Medalists
gold medal	Adam Peaty	Great Britain
silver medal	Arno Kamminga	Netherlands
bronze medal	James Wilby	Great Britain

The Men's 100 metre breaststroke competition of the 2020 European Aquatics Championships was held on 17 and 18 May 2021.

== Records ==
Before the competition, the existing world, European and championship records were as follows.

	Name	Nation	Time	Location	Date
World record European record	Adam Peaty	Great Britain	56.88	Gwangju	21 July 2019
Championship record	Adam Peaty	Great Britain	57.10	Glasgow	4 August 2018

== Results ==
=== Heats ===
The heats were started on 17 May at 11:18.

Rank	Heat	Lane	Name	Nationality	Time	Notes
1	7	4	Adam Peaty	Great Britain	58.26	Q
2	5	4	Ilya Shymanovich	Belarus	58.46	Q
3	7	5	Nicolò Martinenghi	Italy	58.88	Q
4	6	4	Arno Kamminga	Netherlands	59.09	Q
5	5	5	Anton Chupkov	Russia	59.41	Q
6	7	3	Kirill Prigoda	Russia	59.43	Q
7	7	7	Alessandro Pinzuti	Italy	59.45	Q
8	5	2	Andrius Šidlauskas	Lithuania	59.54	Q
9	6	5	James Wilby	Great Britain	59.55	Q
10	5	6	Berkay Ömer Öğretir	Turkey	59.63	Q
11	6	2	Federico Poggio	Italy	59.67	
12	6	6	Lucas Matzerath	Germany	59.87	Q
13	6	3	Tobias Bjerg	Denmark	59.95	Q
14	5	0	Matti Mattsson	Finland	1:00.04	Q, NR
15	7	6	Čaba Silađi	Serbia	1:00.14	Q
16	5	3	Ross Murdoch	Great Britain	1:00.19	
17	6	7	Darragh Greene	Ireland	1:00.20	Q
18	7	1	Danil Semyaninov	Russia	1:00.22	
19	7	9	Erik Persson	Sweden	1:00.23	Q
20	6	1	Giedrius Titenis	Lithuania	1:00.32	
21	4	6	André Klippenberg Grindheim	Norway	1:00.38	
21	4	4	Jan Kozakiewicz	Poland	1:00.38	
23	3	4	Tomáš Klobučník	Slovakia	1:00.43	NR
24	7	2	Caspar Corbeau	Netherlands	1:00.52	
25	7	8	Aleksandr Zhigalov	Russia	1:00.64	
26	5	8	Lyubomir Epitropov	Bulgaria	1:00.70	
27	5	1	Melvin Imoudu	Germany	1:00.84	
28	5	9	Andrea Castello	Italy	1:00.85	
29	7	0	Christopher Rothbauer	Austria	1:00.91	
30	4	5	Max Pilger	Germany	1:01.06	
31	3	2	Jérémy Desplanches	Switzerland	1:01.08	
32	6	8	Valentin Bayer	Austria	1:01.22	
33	4	3	Demirkan Demir	Turkey	1:01.34	
34	5	7	Theo Bussiere	France	1:01.40	
35	3	6	Miikka Ruohoniemi	Finland	1:01.41	
36	4	2	Antoine Viquerat	France	1:01.43	
37	4	9	Johannes Skagius	Sweden	1:01.45	
38	4	7	Tamás Takács	Hungary	1:01.50	
39	3	5	Konstantinos Meretsolias	Greece	1:01.56	
40	3	7	Gonzalo Carazo	Spain	1:01.61	
41	2	6	Matěj Zábojník	Czech Republic	1:01.84	
42	2	4	Filip Chrápavý	Czech Republic	1:01.87	
42	4	0	Francisco Quintas	Portugal	1:01.87	
44	3	3	Jan Kalusowski	Poland	1:01.90	
45	3	0	Jolann Bovey	Switzerland	1:01.91	
46	4	1	Yannick Käser	Switzerland	1:01.96	
46	6	0	Volodymyr Lisovets	Ukraine	1:01.96	
48	2	7	Christoffer Tofte Haarsaker	Norway	1:01.99	
48	2	2	Aleksas Savickas	Lithuania	1:01.99	
50	6	9	Martin Allikvee	Estonia	1:02.11	
51	2	8	Ari-Pekka Liukkonen	Finland	1:02.14	
52	3	8	Rostyslav Kryzhanivskyy	Ukraine	1:02.32	
53	2	1	Savvas Thomoglou	Greece	1:02.43	
54	2	0	Arkadios Aspougalis	Greece	1:02.44	
55	1	5	Joonas Niine	Estonia	1:02.50	
56	1	4	Jaime Morote	Spain	1:02.74	
57	3	1	Joan Ballester	Spain	1:02.76	
57	1	3	Daniils Bobrovs	Latvia	1:02.76	
59	3	9	Dávid Horváth	Hungary	1:02.77	
60	2	5	Ron Polonsky	Israel	1:02.87	
61	2	9	Luka Mladenovic	Austria	1:03.10	
62	1	6	Dominik Márk Török	Hungary	1:03.19	
63	4	8	Kristian Pitshugin	Israel	1:03.20	
64	2	3	Máté Kutasi	Hungary	1:03.28	
65	1	2	Giacomo Casadei	San Marino	1:04.11	
66	1	7	Even Qarri	Albania	1:11.21	

=== Semifinals ===
The semifinals were held on 17 May at 18:53.

==== Semifinal 1 ====
Rank	Lane	Name	Nationality	Time	Notes
1	5	Arno Kamminga	Netherlands	58.74	Q
2	2	Berkay Ömer Öğretir	Turkey	59.23	Q
2	4	Ilya Shymanovich	Belarus	59.23	Q
4	6	Andrius Šidlauskas	Lithuania	59.30	q
5	3	Kirill Prigoda	Russia	59.36	
6	1	Čaba Silađi	Serbia	59.72	
7	7	Tobias Bjerg	Denmark	1:00.12	
8	8	Erik Persson	Sweden	1:00.50	

==== Semifinal 2 ====
Rank	Lane	Name	Nationality	Time	Notes
1	4	Adam Peaty	Great Britain	57.67	Q
2	5	Nicolò Martinenghi	Italy	58.45	Q
3	2	James Wilby	Great Britain	58.80	q
4	6	Alessandro Pinzuti	Italy	59.20	q
5	3	Anton Chupkov	Russia	59.49	
6	7	Lucas Matzerath	Germany	59.65	
7	1	Matti Mattsson	Finland	59.99	NR
8	8	Darragh Greene	Ireland	1:00.26	

=== Final ===
The final was held on 18 May at 18:12.

Rank	Lane	Name	Nationality	Time	Notes
1st place, gold medalist(s)	4	Adam Peaty	Great Britain	57.66	
2nd place, silver medalist(s)	3	Arno Kamminga	Netherlands	58.10	
3rd place, bronze medalist(s)	6	James Wilby	Great Britain	58.58	
4	7	Ilya Shymanovich	Belarus	58.75	
5	5	Nicolò Martinenghi	Italy	58.94	
6	8	Andrius Šidlauskas	Lithuania	59.31	
7	2	Alessandro Pinzuti	Italy	59.50	
8	1	Berkay Ömer Öğretir	Turkey	59.52	
