= 2024 World Aquatics Swimming Championships (25 m) – Men's 200 metre backstroke =

Swimming competition

Men's 200 metre backstroke at the 2024 World Aquatics Swimming Championships (25 m)
- Venue: Duna Arena
- Location: Budapest, Hungary
- Dates: 15 December
- Competitors: 37 from 32 nations
- Winning time: 1:45.65 CR ER

Medalists
gold medal	Hubert Kós	Hungary
silver medal	Lorenzo Mora	Italy
bronze medal	Mewen Tomac	France

The men's 200 metre backstroke event at the 2024 World Aquatics Swimming Championships (25 m) was held on 15 December 2024 at the Duna Arena in Budapest, Hungary.

== Records ==
Prior to the competition, the existing world and championship records were as follows:

World record	Mitch Larkin (AUS)	1:45.63	Sydney, Australia	27 November 2015
Competition record	Ryan Lochte (USA)	1:46.68	Dubai, United Arab Emirates	19 December 2010

The following records was established during the competition:

Date	Event	Name	Nationality	Time	Record
15 December	Final	Hubert Kós	Hungary	1:45.65	CR

== Background ==
Three of the eight finalists from the 2022 Short Course World Championships in Melbourne returned to the event. Neither Ryan Murphy nor Shaine Casas, who won gold and silver in Melbourne, competed in the event. The top seeds included Italy’s Lorenzo Mora, France’s Mewen Tomac, and Australia’s Joshua Edwards-Smith, all entered with times in the 1:48–1:49 range. Edwards-Smith led the world rankings with a 1:49.14 from the Australian Short Course Championships, his personal best and the fastest time of the season. Mora, the 2022 bronze medalist and 2023 European champion, entered with a national record of 1:48.43 set at those championships. Tomac, sixth in Melbourne and a Paris Olympic finalist, held a season best of 1:51.15. Olympic champion Hubert Kós entered with a fast long-course time, while Roman Mityukov, Paris bronze medalist, also returned. Other sub-1:51 entrants included Oleksandr Zheltiakov, Guannan Tao, Enoch Robb, and Dmitrii Savenko.

SwimSwam predicted Kós would win, Mora would take second, and Edwards-Smith would take third.

== Results ==
=== Heats ===
The heats were started at 10:08.

Rank	Heat	Lane	Name	Nationality	Time	Notes
1	2	1	Hubert Kós	Hungary	1:48.02	Q, NR
2	3	4	Mewen Tomac	France	1:50.34	Q
3	4	2	Jan Čejka	Czech Republic	1:50.36	Q
4	3	3	Daiki Yanagawa	Japan	1:50.45	Q
5	4	4	Lorenzo Mora	Italy	1:50.97	Q
6	3	5	Tao Guannan	China	1:51.03	Q
7	4	3	Dmitrii Savenko	Neutral Athletes B	1:51.20	Q
8	3	8	Jack Aikins	United States	1:51.28	Q
9	2	2	Radosław Kawęcki	Poland	1:51.29	R
10	2	5	Enoch Robb	Australia	1:51.39	R
11	1	5	Blake Tierney	Canada	1:51.56	
12	1	3	John Shortt	Ireland	1:51.60	NR
13	4	7	Apostolos Siskos	Greece	1:51.80	
14	3	2	Antoine Herlem	France	1:51.98	
15	2	4	Joshua Edwards-Smith	Australia	1:52.05	
16	3	7	Nicolas Albiero	Brazil	1:52.11	
17	1	7	Hayden Kwan	Hong Kong	1:52.48	NR
18	3	1	Samuel Törnqvist	Sweden	1:52.71	
19	2	3	Aleksei Tkachev	Neutral Athletes B	1:52.84	
20	2	8	Roman Mityukov	Switzerland	1:52.87	
21	3	6	Ádám Telegdy	Hungary	1:53.27	
22	1	6	Yeziel Morales	Puerto Rico	1:53.59	
23	4	9	Lee Ju-ho	South Korea	1:53.69	
24	4	1	Robert Badea	Romania	1:54.48	
25	3	0	Guðmundur Leo Rafnsson	Iceland	1:55.27	
26	4	5	Oleksandr Zheltiakov	Ukraine	1:55.39	
27	1	2	Martin Perečinský	Slovakia	1:55.81	
28	2	0	Evaldas Babakinas	Lithuania	1:56.52	
29	4	0	Yegor Popov	Kazakhstan	1:56.57	
30	4	8	Samuel Brown	New Zealand	1:57.04	
31	2	6	Jiang Chenglin	China	1:57.05	
32	2	9	Nikolass Deičmans	Latvia	1:57.68	
33	1	4	Khiew Hoe Yean	Malaysia	1:57.72	
34	1	1	Denilson Cyprianos	Zimbabwe	1:58.02	NR
35	1	0	Patrick Groters	Aruba	1:58.27	NR
36	1	8	Farrel Tangkas	Indonesia	2:02.13	
37	1	9	Eid Al-Mujaini	United Arab Emirates	2:18.07	
	2	7	Christian Bacico	Italy	Did not start	
	3	9	Oliver Morgan	Great Britain	Did not start	
	4	6	Kacper Stokowski	Poland	Did not start	

=== Final ===
The final was held at 18:12.

Rank	Lane	Name	Nationality	Time	Notes
1st place, gold medalist(s)	4	Hubert Kós	Hungary	1:45.65	CR, ER
2nd place, silver medalist(s)	2	Lorenzo Mora	Italy	1:48.96	
3rd place, bronze medalist(s)	5	Mewen Tomac	France	1:49.93	
4	6	Daiki Yanagawa	Japan	1:50.28	
5	8	Jack Aikins	United States	1:50.60	
6	7	Tao Guannan	China	1:51.04	
7	1	Dmitrii Savenko	Neutral Athletes B	1:51.27	
8	3	Jan Čejka	Czech Republic	1:51.81	
