= 2017 European Junior Swimming Championships =

Water sport competitions

- Host city: Netanya, Israel
- Dates: 28 June - 10 July 2017

The 2017 European Junior Swimming Championships (50 m) were held from 28 June–2 July 2017 in Netanya, Israel. The Championships were organized by LEN, the European Swimming League, and were held in a 50-meter pool. The Championships were for girls aged 14–17 and boys age 15–18.

== Results ==
=== Boys ===
Games	Gold		Silver		Bronze	
50 m freestyle	Leonardo Deplano; Italy	22.47	Björn Seeliger; Sweden	22.54	Maxime Grousset; France	22.59
100 m freestyle	Nándor Németh; Hungary	48.82	Alexei Sancov; Moldova	49.01	Jakub Kraska; Poland	49.35
200 m freestyle	Alexei Sancov; Moldova	1:47.00 WJ	Nándor Németh; Hungary	1:47.14	Ivan Girev; Russia	1:48.13
400 m freestyle	Ákos Kalmár; Hungary	3:50.10	Martin Malyutin; Russia	3:51.50	Balazs Hollo; Hungary	3:51.79
800 m freestyle	Yaroslav Potapov; Russia	7:55.95	Ákos Kalmár; Hungary	7:56.23	Marin Mogic; Croatia	8:01.49
1500 m freestyle	Yaroslav Potapov; Russia	15:07.86	Ákos Kalmár; Hungary	15:09.24	David Lakatos; Hungary	15:14.28
50 m backstroke	Kliment Kolesnikov; Russia	25.15	Conor Ferguson; Ireland	25.27	Kamil Kaźmierczak; Poland	25.33
100 m backstroke	Kacper Stokowski; Poland	54.60	Kliment Kolesnikov; Russia	54.69	Thierry Bollin; Switzerland	54.92
200 m backstroke	Kliment Kolesnikov; Russia	1:57.73	Daniel Cristian Martin; Romania	1:58.72	Nikita Tretyakov; Russia	1:59.20
50 m breaststroke	Nicolò Martinenghi; Italy	27.24	Alessandro Pinzuti; Italy	27.51	Evgenii Somov; Russia	28.08
100 m breaststroke	Nicolò Martinenghi; Italy	59.23 WJ EJ CR	Evgenii Somov; Russia	1:01.09	Alessandro Pinzuti; Italy	1:01.28
200 m breaststroke	Evgenii Somov; Russia	2:10.79	Valentin Bayer; Austria	2:13.54	Mykyta Koptyelov; Ukraine	2:13.78
50 m butterfly	Ümitcan Güreş; Turkey	23.72	Kristóf Milák; Hungary	23.86	Maxime Grousset; France	23.88
100 m butterfly	Egor Kuimov; Russia	51.35 EJ CR	Kristóf Milák; Hungary	51.49	Kregor Zirk; Estonia	52.98
200 m butterfly	Kristóf Milák; Hungary	1:53.79 WJ EJ CR	Federico Burdisso; Italy	1:57.83	Denys Kesil; Ukraine	1:58.19
200 m individual medley	Thomas Dean; Great Britain	2:01.02	Márton Barta; Hungary	2:01.82	James McFadzen; Great Britain	2:02.67
400 m individual medley	Balázs Holló; Hungary	4:19.55	Thomas Dean; Great Britain	4:20.20	Marcel Wągrowski; Poland	4:21.63
4×100 m freestyle	Poland; Karol Ostrowski (49.91); Bartosz Piszczorowicz (48.86); Kacper Stokowski (49.46); Jakub Kraska (48.88)	3:17.11	Hungary; Nándor Németh (48.99); Richárd Márton (50.00); Márton Barta (49.85); Kristóf Milák (48.76)	3:17.60	Russia; Kliment Kolesnikov (49.66); Vladimir Dubinin (49.24); Ivan Girev (49.15); Gleb Karasev (49.94)	3:17.99
4×200 m freestyle	Hungary; Kristóf Milák (1:48.41); Nándor Németh (1:49.08); Richárd Márton (1:48.84); Balázs Holló (1:49.13)	7:15.46 CR	Russia; Martin Malyutin (1:49.14); Petr Zhikharev (1:49.61); Mikhail Bocharnikov (1:49.49); Ivan Girev (1:47.34)	7:15.58	Israel; Tomer Frankel (1:49.89); Italy Karmi (1:50.18); Denis Loktev (1:48.48); Alon Shami (1:51.02)	7:19.57
4×100 m medley	Italy; Thomas Ceccon (54.72); Nicolò Martinenghi (58.93); Federico Burdisso (52.69); Davide Nardini (48.90)	3:35.24 WJ EJ CR	Russia; Kliment Kolesnikov (54.51); Evgenii Somov (1:00.97); Egor Kuimov (51.07); Ivan Girev (48.89)	3:35.44	Poland; Kamil Kaźmierczak (55.17); Rafał Kusto (1:01.52); Jakub Kraska (53.09); Bartosz Piszczorowicz (48.99)	3:38.77

=== Girls ===
Games	Gold		Silver		Bronze	
50 m freestyle	Barbora Seemanová; Czech Republic	25.06	Julie Kepp Jensen; Denmark	25.22	Neža Klančar; Slovenia	25.35
100 m freestyle	Marrit Steenbergen; Netherlands	54.13	Barbora Seemanová; Czech Republic	54.62	Vasilissa Buinaia; Russia	55.58
200 m freestyle	Ajna Késely; Hungary	1:57.85 CR	Valentine Dumont; Belgium	1:58.69	Barbora Seemanová; Czech Republic	1:59.32
400 m freestyle	Ajna Késely; Hungary	4:08.25	Beatriz Agueda; Spain	4:10.13	Katja Fain; Slovenia	4:11.36
800 m freestyle	Ajna Késely; Hungary	8:31.81 CR	Beatriz Agueda; Spain	8:35.18	Anastasiia Kirpichnikova; Russia	8:36.79
1500 m freestyle	Ajna Késely; Hungary	16:11.25 CR	Beatriz Agueda; Spain	16:29.21	Giulia Salin; Italy	16:32.65
50 m backstroke	Daria Vaskina; Russia	28.39	Polina Egorova; Russia	28.50	Tania Quaglieri; Italy	28.62
100 m backstroke	Polina Egorova; Russia	59.62 EJ CR	Daria Vaskina; Russia	1:00.90	Tatiana Salcutan; Moldova	1:01.55
200 m backstroke	Polina Egorova; Russia	2:08.97 CR	Anastasia Avdeeva; Russia	2:09.91	Tatiana Salcutan; Moldova	2:10.12
50 m breaststroke	Mona McSharry; Ireland	31.38	Weronika Hallmann; Poland	31.55	Tina Celik; Slovenia	31.57
100 m breaststroke	Mona McSharry; Ireland	1:07.61	Tes Schouten; Netherlands	1:09.03	Hannah Brunzell; Sweden	1:09.59
200 m breaststroke	Layla Black; Great Britain	2:27.31	Mona McSharry; Ireland	2:27.44	Hannah Brunzell; Sweden	2:29.36
50 m butterfly	Anastasiya Shkurdai; Belarus	26.53	Polina Egorova; Russia	26.62	Sara Junevik; Sweden	26.69
100 m butterfly	Katrine Villesen; Denmark	59.43	Polina Egorova; Russia	59.59	Hanna Rosvall; Sweden	59.95
200 m butterfly	Katrine Villesen; Denmark	2:09.41	Ciara Schlosshan; Great Britain	2:10.48	Valentine Dumont; Belgium	2:11.17
200 m individual medley	Marrit Steenbergen; Netherlands	2:13.69	Anja Crevar; Serbia	2:14.13	Alicia Wilson; Great Britain	2:14.60
400 m individual medley	Anja Crevar; Serbia	4:41.17	Anna Pirovano; Italy	4:43.20	Cyrielle Duhamel; France	4:43.63
4×100 m freestyle	Russia; Katarina Milutinovich (56.12); Polina Osipenko (55.48); Irina Krivonogova (55.35); Vasilissa Buinaia (55.27)	3:42.22	Netherlands; Laura van Engelen (57.04); Imani de Jong (56.73); Yaelle Lucht (56.39); Marrit Steenbergen (53.37)	3:43.53	Belgium; Valentine Dumont (55.56); Juliette Dumont (55.20); Anke Geeroms (57.22); Lotte Goris (56.31)	3:44.29
4×200 m freestyle	Hungary; Fanni Gyurinovics (2:01.00); Janka Juhász (2:00.46); Petra Barocsai (2:00.25); Ajna Késely (1:57.28)	7:58.99 CR	Belgium; Valentine Dumont (1:58.35); Juliette Dumont (2:01.43); Camille Bouden (2:03.16); Lotte Goris (1:59.73)	8:02.67	Russia; Irina Krivonogova (1:59.73); Katarina Milutinovich (2:02.18); Vasilissa Buinaia (2:02.20); Anastasiia Kirpichnikova (1:59.55)	8:03.66
4×100 m medley	Russia; Daria Vaskina (1:01.28); Alena Chekhovskikh (1:08.97); Polina Egorova (58.91); Vasilissa Buinaia (55.60)	4:04.76	Hungary; Dorottya Dobos (1:03.37); Reka Vecsei (1:08.89); Petra Barocsai (59.50); Fanni Gyurinovics (56.14)	4:07.90	Poland; Julia Koluch (1:02.98); Weronika Hallmann (1:08.65); Katarzyna Kolodziej (1:01.22); Aleksandra Polanska (55.69)	4:08.74

=== Mixed events ===
Games	Gold		Silver		Bronze	
4×100 m freestyle	Hungary; Kristóf Milák (49.44); Nándor Németh (48.36); Fanni Gyurinovics (55.09); Ajna Késely (55.61)	3:28.50 EJ CR	Russia; Kliment Kolesnikov (49.37); Vladimir Dubinin (50.11); Polina Osipenko (56.06); Vasilissa Buinaia (55.13)	3:30.67	Poland; Bartosz Piszczorowicz (50.05); Kornelia Fiedkiewicz (56.43); Aleksandra Polanska (55.61); Jakub Kraska (48.67)	3:30.76
4×100 m medley	Italy; Tania Quaglieri (1:02.03); Nicolò Martinenghi (59.09); Alberto Razzetti (54.12); Maria Ginevra Masciopinto (55.75)	3:50.99	Russia; Kliment Kolesnikov (56.43); Evgenii Somov (1:00.64); Polina Egorova (59.59); Vasilissa Buinaia (55.18)	3:51.84	Great Britain; Lily Boseley (1:02.63); Oliver Crosby (1:02.21); Ciara Schlosshan (1:00.01); Scott McLay (49.39)	3:54.24

== Medal table ==
Host nation

Rank	Nation	Gold	Silver	Bronze	Total
1	Russia (RUS)	11	12	7	30
2	Hungary (HUN)	11	8	2	21
3	Italy (ITA)	5	3	3	11
4	Great Britain (GBR)	2	2	3	7
5	Ireland (IRL)	2	2	0	4
5	Netherlands (NED)	2	2	0	4
7	Poland (POL)	2	1	6	9
8	Denmark (DEN)	2	1	0	3
9	Moldova (MDA)	1	1	2	4
10	Czech Republic (CZE)	1	1	1	3
11	Serbia (SRB)	1	1	0	2
12	Belarus (BLR)	1	0	0	1
12	Turkey (TUR)	1	0	0	1
14	Spain (ESP)	0	3	0	3
15	Belgium (BEL)	0	2	2	4
16	Sweden (SWE)	0	1	4	5
17	Austria (AUT)	0	1	0	1
17	Romania (ROU)	0	1	0	1
19	France (FRA)	0	0	3	3
19	Slovenia (SLO)	0	0	3	3
21	Ukraine (UKR)	0	0	2	2
22	Croatia (CRO)	0	0	1	1
22	Estonia (EST)	0	0	1	1
22	Israel (ISR)*	0	0	1	1
22	Switzerland (SUI)	0	0	1	1
Totals (25 entries)		42	42	42	126
