= Swimming at the 2020 European Aquatics Championships – Men's 50 metre breaststroke =

Men's 50 metre breaststroke at the 2020 European Aquatics Championships
- Venue: Danube Arena
- Dates: 21 May 2021 (heats and semifinals); 22 May (final)
- Competitors: 55 from 31 nations
- Winning time: 26.21

Medalists
gold medal	Adam Peaty	Great Britain
silver medal	Ilya Shymanovich	Belarus
bronze medal	Nicolò Martinenghi	Italy

The Men's 50 metre breaststroke competition of the 2020 European Aquatics Championships was held on 21 and 22 May 2021.

== Records ==
Prior the competition, the existing world, European and championship records were as follows.

	Name	Nationality	Time	Location	Date
World record European record	Adam Peaty	Great Britain	25.95	Budapest	25 July 2017
Championship record	Adam Peaty	Great Britain	26.09	Glasgow	8 August 2018

== Results ==
=== Heats ===
The heats were started on 21 May 2021 at 10:17.

Rank	Heat	Lane	Name	Nationality	Time	Notes
1	6	4	Adam Peaty	Great Britain	26.34	Q
2	5	4	Nicolò Martinenghi	Italy	26.54	Q
3	4	4	Ilya Shymanovich	Belarus	26.72	Q
4	5	3	Jan Kozakiewicz	Poland	26.82	Q, NR
5	6	5	Kirill Prigoda	Russia	26.93	Q
6	4	3	Melvin Imoudu	Germany	27.00	Q
7	3	1	Lucas Matzerath	Germany	27.18	Q
8	5	6	Alessandro Pinzuti	Italy	27.26	Q
9	4	5	Čaba Silađi	Serbia	27.27	Q
10	4	2	Federico Poggio	Italy	27.33	
11	5	5	Arno Kamminga	Netherlands	27.36	Q
12	5	2	Johannes Skagius	Sweden	27.43	Q
13	4	6	Bernhard Reitshammer	Austria	27.44	Q
14	6	6	James Wilby	Great Britain	27.51	Q
15	6	2	Danil Semyaninov	Russia	27.58	Q
16	3	7	Olivér Gál	Hungary	27.64	Q
17	4	1	Christopher Rothbauer	Austria	27.71	Q
18	6	7	Ross Murdoch	Great Britain	27.73	
18	4	7	Giedrius Titenis	Lithuania	27.73	
20	5	7	Caspar Corbeau	Netherlands	27.76	
20	5	1	Berkay Ömer Öğretir	Turkey	27.76	
22	4	8	Heiko Gigler	Austria	27.77	
22	3	5	Tomáš Klobučník	Slovakia	27.77	
24	4	9	Miikka Ruohoniemi	Finland	27.90	
25	5	9	Arkadios Aspougalis	Greece	27.93	
26	3	4	Kristian Pitshugin	Israel	27.94	
26	5	8	Andrius Šidlauskas	Lithuania	27.94	
28	6	1	Theo Bussiere	France	27.95	
29	2	9	André Klippenberg Grindheim	Norway	27.96	
30	6	8	Valentin Bayer	Austria	28.02	
31	2	2	Christoffer Tofte Haarsaker	Norway	28.05	
32	3	3	Joonas Niine	Estonia	28.06	
33	3	0	Konstantinos Meretsolias	Greece	28.12	
34	6	0	Aleksandr Zhigalov	Russia	28.16	
35	2	5	Ari-Pekka Liukkonen	Finland	28.20	
36	4	0	Eoin Corby	Ireland	28.25	
36	3	6	Lyubomir Epitropov	Bulgaria	28.25	
36	3	9	Volodymyr Lisovets	Ukraine	28.25	
39	2	3	Gonzalo Carazo	Spain	28.27	
39	5	0	Rostyslav Kryzhanivskyy	Ukraine	28.27	
41	2	4	Jaime Morote	Spain	28.35	
42	2	8	Alexis Santos	Portugal	28.43	
42	2	1	Tamás Takács	Hungary	28.43	
44	6	9	Martin Allikvee	Estonia	28.45	
45	3	2	Yannick Käser	Switzerland	28.46	
46	2	7	Francisco Quintas	Portugal	28.52	
46	2	6	Martin Szöllősi	Hungary	28.52	
48	3	8	Jan Kalusowski	Poland	28.53	
49	1	7	Nicholas Lia	Norway	28.57	
50	1	4	Matej Zabojnik	Czech Republic	28.86	
51	1	5	Constantin Malachi	Moldova	29.03	
52	1	3	Daniils Bobrovs	Latvia	29.49	
53	1	6	Giacomo Casadei	San Marino	29.72	
54	1	1	Anton Herrala	Finland	30.60	
55	1	2	Even Qarri	Albania	32.57	
	6	3	Tobias Bjerg	Denmark	Did not start	
	2	0	Dávid Horváth	Hungary	Did not start	

=== Semifinals ===
The semifinals were held on 21 May at 18:57.

==== Semifinal 1 ====
Rank	Lane	Name	Nationality	Time	Notes
1	4	Nicolò Martinenghi	Italy	26.49	Q
2	5	Jan Kozakiewicz	Poland	27.09	Q
3	6	Alessandro Pinzuti	Italy	27.11	q
4	2	Arno Kamminga	Netherlands	27.13	q
5	3	Melvin Imoudu	Germany	27.20	
6	1	Danil Semyaninov	Russia	27.32	
7	7	Bernhard Reitshammer	Austria	27.44	
8	8	Christopher Rothbauer	Austria	27.80	

==== Semifinal 2 ====
Rank	Lane	Name	Nationality	Time	Notes
1	4	Adam Peaty	Great Britain	26.38	Q
2	5	Ilya Shymanovich	Belarus	26.47	Q
3	6	Lucas Matzerath	Germany	27.14	q
4	3	Kirill Prigoda	Russia	27.16	q
5	7	Johannes Skagius	Sweden	27.33	
6	2	Čaba Silađi	Serbia	27.34	
7	1	James Wilby	Great Britain	27.36	
8	8	Olivér Gál	Hungary	27.79	

=== Final ===
The final was held on 22 May 2021 at 18:18.

Rank	Lane	Name	Nationality	Time	Notes
1st place, gold medalist(s)	4	Adam Peaty	Great Britain	26.21	
2nd place, silver medalist(s)	5	Ilya Shymanovich	Belarus	26.55	
3rd place, bronze medalist(s)	3	Nicolò Martinenghi	Italy	26.68	
4	6	Jan Kozakiewicz	Poland	27.10	
5	7	Arno Kamminga	Netherlands	27.13	
5	1	Lucas Matzerath	Germany	27.13	
7	8	Kirill Prigoda	Russia	27.30	
8	2	Alessandro Pinzuti	Italy	27.54	
