= Swimming at the 2022 Mediterranean Games – Men's 4 × 100 metre medley relay =

Men's 4 × 100 metre medley relay at the 2022 Mediterranean Games
- Location: Bir El Djir, Algeria
- Dates: 4 July
- Competitors: 46 from 9 nations
- Teams: 9
- Winning time: 3:35.77

Medalists
gold medal	Lorenzo Mora; Alessandro Pinzuti; Matteo Rivolta; Alessandro Bori; Matteo Restivo; Alessandro Fusco; Simone Stefanì; Filippo Megli	Italy
silver medal	Mathys Chouchaoui; Clément Bidard; Stanislas Huille; Charles Rihoux; Christophe Brun; Sergueï Comte	France
bronze medal	Berke Saka; Berkay Ömer Öğretir; Ümitcan Güreş; Baturalp Ünlü	Turkey

The men's 4 × 100 metre medley relay competition at the 2022 Mediterranean Games was held on 4 July 2022 at the Aquatic Center of the Olympic Complex in Bir El Djir.

== Records ==
Prior to this competition, the existing world and Mediterranean Games records were as follows:

World record	United States	3:26.78	Tokyo, Japan	1 August 2021
Mediterranean Games record	Spain	3:34.22	Pescara, Italy	1 July 2009

== Results ==
=== Heats ===
The heats were started at 10:55.

Rank	Heat	Lane	Nation	Swimmers	Time	Notes
1	1	4	Turkey	Berke Saka (56.46); Berkay Ömer Öğretir (1:00.17); Ümitcan Güreş (54.33); Baturalp Ünlü (50.19)	3:41.15	Q
2	2	6	France	Christophe Brun (56.23); Clément Bidard (1:00.95); Sergueï Comte (54.46); Charles Rihoux (49.86)	3:41.50	Q
3	1	6	Spain	Manuel Martos (54.69); Alex Castejón (1:02.28); Mario Mollà (55.20); Luis Domínguez (49.68)	3:41.85	Q
4	2	4	Italy	Matteo Restivo (56.44); Alessandro Fusco (1:01.90); Simone Stefanì (53.01); Filippo Megli (51.99)	3:43.34	Q
5	1	3	Slovenia	Sašo Boškan (55.90); Peter John Stevens (1:02.07); Anže Ferš Eržen (54.45); Primož Šenica Pavletič (51.09)	3:43.51	Q
6	2	5	Greece	Georgios Spanoudakis (55.69); Konstantinos Meretsolias (1:03.78); Konstantinos Stamou (54.21); Stergios Bilas (51.26)	3:44.94	Q
7	2	2	Portugal	Francisco Santos (55.53); Francisco Quintas (1:01.96); Diogo Ribeiro (55.00); Miguel Nascimento (54.94)	3:47.43	Q
8	1	5	Algeria	Abdellah Ardjoune (57.30); Moncef Aymen Balamane (1:02.57); Fares Benzidoun (57.19); Mehdi Nazim Benbara (51.31)	3:48.37	Q
9	2	3	Cyprus	Sofoklis Mougis (58.54); Panayiotis Panaretos (1:03.36); Christos Manoli (59.64); Markos Iakovidis (58.27)	3:59.81	

=== Final ===
The final was held at 19:10.

Rank	Lane	Nation	Swimmers	Time	Notes
1st place, gold medalist(s)	6	Italy	Lorenzo Mora (54.73); Alessandro Pinzuti (1:00.44); Matteo Rivolta (51.56); Alessandro Bori (49.04)	3:35.77	
2nd place, silver medalist(s)	5	France	Mathys Chouchaoui (54.87); Clément Bidard (1:00.46); Stanislas Huille (52.43); Charles Rihoux (48.27)	3:36.03	
3rd place, bronze medalist(s)	4	Turkey	Berke Saka (54.88) NR; Berkay Ömer Öğretir (59.28); Ümitcan Güreş (52.18); Baturalp Ünlü (49.95)	3:36.29	
4	7	Greece	Evangelos Makrygiannis (54.87); Konstantinos Meretsolias (1:00.88); Konstantinos Stamou (52.61); Kristian Gkolomeev (47.98)	3:36.34	
5	1	Portugal	João Costa (54.45); Gabriel Lopes (1:01.45); Diogo Ribeiro (52.80); Miguel Nascimento (48.80)	3:37.50	NR
6	3	Spain	Manuel Martos (55.17); Alex Castejón (1:02.23); Mario Mollà (53.01); Luis Domínguez (49.09)	3:39.50	
7	2	Slovenia	Sašo Boškan (55.57); Peter John Stevens (1:01.20); Anže Ferš Eržen (54.40); Primož Šenica Pavletič (50.21)	3:41.38	
8	8	Algeria	Abdellah Ardjoune (56.16); Moncef Aymen Balamane (1:02.10); Fares Benzidoun (56.76); Mehdi Nazim Benbara (51.23 )	3:46.25	
