= Swimming at the 2022 Mediterranean Games – Men's 100 metre backstroke =

Men's 100 metre backstroke at the 2022 Mediterranean Games
- Location: Bir El Djir, Algeria
- Dates: 2 July
- Competitors: 11 from 7 nations
- Winning time: 54.35

Medalists
gold medal	Evangelos Makrygiannis	Greece
silver medal	Lorenzo Mora	Italy
bronze medal	Stanislas Huille	France

The men's 100 metre backstroke competition at the 2022 Mediterranean Games was held on 1 July 2022 at the Aquatic Center of the Olympic Complex in Bir El Djir.

== Records ==
Prior to this competition, the existing world and Mediterranean Games records were as follows:

World record	Thomas Ceccon (ITA)	51.60	Budapest, Hungary	20 June 2022
Mediterranean Games record	Aschwin Wildeboer (ESP)	52.38	Pescara, Italy	1 July 2009

== Results ==
=== Heats ===
The heats were started at 10:55.

Rank	Heat	Lane	Name	Nationality	Time	Notes
1	2	3	Stanislas Huille	France	54.73	Q
2	1	4	Evangelos Makrygiannis	Greece	55.02	Q
3	1	3	Mathys Chouchaoui	France	55.05	Q
4	3	5	Lorenzo Mora	Italy	55.09	Q
5	3	4	João Costa	Portugal	55.40	Q
6	1	6	Javier Arauz	Spain	55.41	Q
7	2	2	Abdellah Ardjoune	Algeria	55.50	Q
8	3	6	Diego Mira	Spain	55.52	Q
9	2	7	Georgios Spanoudakis	Greece	55.60	
10	2	5	Matteo Restivo	Italy	55.88	
11	1	6	Sašo Boškan	Slovenia	56.07	
12	3	3	Berke Saka	Turkey	56.18	
13	2	4	Francisco Santos	Portugal	56.39	
14	1	5	Ognjen Marić	Croatia	56.76	
15	1	2	Primož Šenica Pavletič	Slovenia	57.13	
16	3	7	Sofoklis Mougis	Cyprus	58.01	
17	3	2	Filippos Iakovidis	Cyprus	58.19	
18	1	7	Frenkli Vogli	Albania	1:00.50	

=== Final ===
The final was held at 10:55.

Rank	Lane	Name	Nationality	Time	Notes
1st place, gold medalist(s)	5	Evangelos Makrygiannis	Greece	54.35	
2nd place, silver medalist(s)	6	Lorenzo Mora	Italy	54.50	
3rd place, bronze medalist(s)	4	Stanislas Huille	France	54.66	
4	2	João Costa	Portugal	54.69	
5	3	Mathys Chouchaoui	France	54.84	
6	7	Javier Arauz	Spain	55.05	
7	8	Diego Mira	Spain	55.59	
8	1	Abdellah Ardjoune	Algeria	55.82	
