= Lorenzo Mora =

Italian swimmer (born 1998)

Personal information
- Full name: Lorenzo Mora
- National team: Italy
- Born: 30 September 1998 (age 27) Carpi, Emilia-Romagna, Italy
- Height: 1.88 m (6 ft 2 in)

Sport
- Sport: Swimming
- Strokes: Backstroke
- Club: GS Fiamme Oro; Team Iron
- Coach: Fabrizio Bastelli
Medal record
Men's swimming
Representing Italy
Event	1st	2nd	3rd
World Championships (SC)	2	4	5
European Championships (SC)	4	1	2
Mediterranean Games	2	1	1
Total	8	6	8
World Championships (SC)
Gold medal – first place	2021 Abu Dhabi	4×100 m medley
Gold medal – first place	2022 Melbourne	4×50 m medley
Silver medal – second place	2021 Abu Dhabi	50 m backstroke
Silver medal – second place	2022 Melbourne	100 m backstroke
Silver medal – second place	2022 Melbourne	4×50 m mixed medley
Silver medal – second place	2024 Budapest	200 m backstroke
Bronze medal – third place	2021 Abu Dhabi	4×50 m mixed medley
Bronze medal – third place	2021 Abu Dhabi	4×50 m medley
Bronze medal – third place	2022 Melbourne	200 m backstroke
Bronze medal – third place	2022 Melbourne	4×100 m medley
Bronze medal – third place	2024 Budapest	4×100 m medley
European Championships (SC)
Gold medal – first place	2021 Kazan	4×50 m medley
Gold medal – first place	2023 Otopeni	200 m backstroke
Gold medal – first place	2023 Otopeni	4×50 m medley
Gold medal – first place	2023 Otopeni	4×50 m mixed medley
Gold medal – first place	2025 Lublin	4×50 m medley
Silver medal – second place	2021 Kazan	200 m backstroke
Bronze medal – third place	2023 Otopeni	50 m backstroke
Bronze medal – third place	2023 Otopeni	100 m backstroke
Mediterranean Games
Gold medal – first place	2022 Oran	4×100 m medley
Gold medal – first place	2022 Oran	200 m backstroke
Silver medal – second place	2022 Oran	100 m backstroke
Bronze medal – third place	2022 Oran	50 m backstroke

Lorenzo Mora (born 30 September 1998) is a competitive Italian swimmer. He is a world record holder in the short course 4×50 metre medley relay. He is the Italian record holder in the short course 100 metre backstroke and 200 metre backstroke. In the 50 metre backstroke, he won the silver medal at the 2021 World Short Course Championships and the bronze medal at the 2022 Mediterranean Games (long course). In the 100 metre backstroke, he won the silver medal at each the 2022 World Short Course Championships and the 2022 Mediterranean Games. In the 200 metre backstroke, he won the bronze medal at the 2022 World Short Course Championships, the silver medal at the 2021 European Short Course Championships, and the gold medal at the 2022 Mediterranean Games.

== Early life ==
Mora was born on 30 September 1998 in Carpi, Emilia-Romagna, Italy.

== Career ==
=== 2015–2019 ===
At the inaugural European Games in 2015, held in June in Baku, Azerbaijan, Mora competed in three individual events as a 16-year-old, placing thirteenth in the 50 metre backstroke, seventeenth in the 200 metre backstroke, and twenty-eighth in the 100 metre backstroke. On the first day of the 2015 European Short Course Championships in December, he placed tenth in the 200 metre backstroke with a time of 1:54.12. The following day, he swam a time of 52.23 seconds in the preliminaries of the 100 metre backstroke to place nineteenth. Day five of five, he placed thirty-fourth in the 50 metre backstroke with a time of 24.91 seconds. The following year, at the 2016 European Junior Championships in July, he placed twentieth in the 50 metre backstroke with a 26.54, twenty-fourth in the 100 metre backstroke with a 57.05, and thirty-seventh in the 200 metre backstroke with a 2:07.57.

In December 2017, Mora competed at the year's European Short Course Championships in Copenhagen, Denmark, placing fourteenth in the semifinals of the 100 metre backstroke with a 51.46, twelfth with a time of 1:53.16 in the 200 metre backstroke, and twenty-seventh in the 50 metre backstroke with a time of 24.31 seconds. At the 2019 Nico Sapio Trophy in Genoa in November, he set his first Italian record, breaking the mark of 1:50.75 in the short course 200 metre backstroke set by Simone Sabbioni in 2015 with a time of 1:50.45 in the final. The following month, at the 2019 European Short Course Championships in Glasgow, Scotland, he placed seventh in the final of the 200 metre backstroke with a 1:51.69, eighth in the final of the 100 metre backstroke with a time of 50.61 seconds, was disqualified in the semifinals of the 50 metre backstroke, and helped achieve a fourth-place finish in the 4×50 metre medley relay, swimming the backstroke leg of the relay in the preliminaries.

=== 2021 ===
On 1 April 2021, Mora won the gold medal in the 200 metre backstroke at the 2021 Italian National Spring Championships with a personal best time of 1:57.23, which was 0.27 seconds faster than the Olympic qualifying time of 1:57.50 for the 2020 Summer Olympics and 0.46 seconds faster than silver medalist Matteo Restivo. While his time was an Olympic qualifying time, Team Italy used 22 of 26 spots for male swimmers on its 2020 Olympic Games swim team and sent only Matteo Restivo to compete in the 200 metre backstroke, each national Olympic committee was permitted up to two swimmers per individual event if they each achieved the Olympic qualification time.

==== 2020 European Aquatics Championships ====
For his first event of the 2020 European Aquatics Championships, with swimming conducted in long course metres in May 2021 at Danube Arena in Budapest, Hungary due to the COVID-19 pandemic, Mora placed thirty-second in the 50 metre backstroke with a time of 25.76 seconds on the first day of competition. Two days later, he placed twenty-ninth in the 100 metre backstroke with a time of 54.98 seconds. In the preliminaries of his third and final event two days later, the 200 metre backstroke, he ranked tenth with a time of 1:58.48, which was 3.81 seconds behind first-ranked Luke Greenbank of Great Britain and qualified him for the semifinals. He placed fourteenth overall in the semifinals with a time of 1:58.13.

==== 2021 European Short Course Championships ====
2021 European Championships (SC)
Gold medal – first place	4x50 m medley relay	1:30.14 (h)
Silver medal – second place	200 m backstroke	1:49.73 (NR)

At the 2021 European Short Course Championships, held in the Palace of Water Sports in Kazan, Russia, Mora placed sixth in the 50 metre backstroke final with a time of 23.19 seconds. In the 100 metre backstroke, he swam a 50.19 and placed sixth in the final after swimming a time of 50.12 seconds in the semifinals. For his third and final individual event, he swam a 1:52.73 in the prelims heats of the 200 metre backstroke, qualifying for the semifinals later the same day. In the evening semifinals, he set a new Italian record in the event with his time of 1:50.17, which advanced him to the final ranked first. The following day, the sixth and final day of competition, he lowered his own Italian record in the 200 metre backstroke with a time of 1:49.73 in the final that also won him the silver medal in the event. For his relay event, the 4×50 metre medley relay, he swam the backstroke leg of the relay in a time of 23.21 in the prelims heats, helping advance the relay to the final ranked second with a time of 1:32.98. The finals relay, which did not include Mora, went on to place first in the final and all Italy relay members in the prelims and final won a gold medal for their efforts.

==== 2021 International Swimming League ====
As part of the swim club Team Iron in the 2021 International Swimming League, Mora helped his club advance to the playoffs, placing third in the 100 metre backstroke at the eleventh and final match of the regular season. He won the 200 metre backstroke in the first match of the playoffs season with a time of 1:50.92, finishing over a second and a half before second and third place finishers Brodie Williams and Evgeny Rylov. In the 50 metre backstroke later the same day, he placed sixth with his time of 23.46 seconds. Up for diversifying his racing portfolio, he also swam the second leg of the 4×100 metre freestyle relay, splitting a time of 52.12 seconds, which was exactly two seconds slower than his personal best 100 metre time in backstroke, and helping the relay finish in seventh place with a time of 3:30.48. The second day of the match, he placed fifth with a near-personal-best time of 50.41 seconds in the 100 metre backstroke. He followed up his individual event swim by swimming the backstroke leg of the mixed 4×100 metre medley relay, where his relay placed eighth overall and he swam a time of 50.63 seconds for his 100 metre portion of the relay.

In the fourth match of the playoffs, the second match Team Iron competed in, Mora started his competition on day one with a time of 1:51.21 in the 200 metre backstroke, which earned him fourth place and his team 5.0 points. He swam a split time of 47.74 seconds for the third leg of the 4×100 metre freestyle relay, helping the relay team place sixth in a time of 3:11.39. In his third race of the day, he placed sixth in the 50 metre backstroke with a time of 23.56 seconds. The second and final day of competition for the match, he earned another 2.0 points for his team, placing seventh in the 100 metre backstroke with a time of 50.75 seconds. Swimming the backstroke leg of the mixed 4×100 metre medley relay, he helped the relay earn 10.0 points and finish fourth with a time of 3:37.05.

On day one of the sixth and final playoffs match of the year, Mora won the 200 metre backstroke in a time of 1:50.55 and scored 12.0 points for Team Iron, marking his second win in an individual event in the playoffs season. In his second event of the day, the 4×100 metre freestyle relay, he split a time of 50.99 seconds for the second leg of the relay to help it place seventh. For his final race of the day, he was the fastest backstroke leg out of all the relays in the 4×100 metre medley relay with a lead-off time of 50.16 seconds, which helped the relay place third in 3:24.94 and win 12.0 points. On 28 November, the second and final day of the match, he placed second in the 100 metre backstroke with a near personal best time of 50.17 seconds, earning 7.0 points. In the 4×100 meter mixed medley relay, he swam a 50.05 for the backstroke leg of the relay, which was faster than his personal best time of 50.12 seconds but did not count as a best time because it was attained in a mixed gender event, and out-split all other backstrokers in the event to help his relay earn 10.0 points and place fourth overall. His team took second place over the Aqua Centurions by 1.5 points for the match, meaning had he not won the 200 metre backstroke, Team Iron would have finished in third place instead of second place. By the end of the 2021 season, out of the 488 swimmers who had competed in the International Swimming League between 2019 and 2021 and earned positive most valuable player points, he ranked 195th.

==== 2021 Italian Short Course Championships ====
Two days after the end of racing in the International Swimming League for Mora for the year, he won the 100 metre backstroke with a time of 50.38 seconds, over half a second faster than the second place finisher, at the 2021 Italian Short Course National Championships in Riccione. In the 50 metre backstroke the next day, he won the event with a time of 23.43 seconds. He swam a 1:50.27 in the 200 metre backstroke, finishing over 3 seconds ahead of the next fastest competitor and winning his third event of the Championships.

==== 2021 World Short Course Championships ====
2021 World Championships (SC)
Gold medal – first place	4×100 m medley	3:19.76 (CR, NR)
Silver medal – second place	50 m backstroke	22.90
Bronze medal – third place	4×50 m mixed medley	1:37.29
Bronze medal – third place	4×50 m medley	1:30.78

Mora was named to the Italian roster in early December for the 2021 World Short Course Championships in Abu Dhabi, United Arab Emirates starting two weeks after the roster announcement. For his individual events, he entered to compete in all three backstroke distances, the 50 metre backstroke, 100 metre backstroke, and 200 metre backstroke.

In the preliminary heats of the 100 metre backstroke, Mora tied Shaine Casas of the United States in the same heat for third rank across all heats with a time of 50.40 seconds and qualified for the semifinals. Later in the day, he achieved a personal best time of 49.99 seconds in the semifinals of the 100 metre backstroke, marking the first time he swam the event faster than 50 seconds, and advanced to the final ranking fifth. The following day, he placed eighth in the final with a personal best time of 49.93 seconds that was less than four-tenths of a second away from earning the bronze medal, which went to Robert Glință of Romania who swam a time of 49.60 seconds. In the morning preliminary heats of the 50 metre backstroke on day three, he advanced to the semifinals tied in ranking for eighth with his time of 23.49 seconds. For the semifinals, he and Shaine Casas both achieved a time of 23.13 seconds and qualified for the final tied in rank for fourth overall. Later in the same session, he won a bronze medal as part of the 4×50 metre mixed medley relay, splitting a 23.28 for the backstroke leg of the relay in the final to contribute to the relay's time of 1:37.29.

In the evening of day four, Mora won a silver medal in the final of the 50 metre backstroke, tying Christian Diener of Germany with a time of 22.90 seconds and finishing less than four-tenths of a second behind gold medalist Kliment Kolesnikov of Russia. He led-off the 4×50 metre medley relay in the preliminaries with a split of 23.65 on day five, contributing to a time of 1:33.60 and ranking of fifth heading into the final. In the final, he lowered his backstroke split to a 23.24, contributing to the final time of 1:30.78 and a bronze-medal-win. On the sixth and final day of competition, he swam a 1:51.58 in the preliminaries of the 200 metre backstroke and qualified for the final ranking fifth. In the final of the 200 metre backstroke later in the day, he set a new Italian record with his time of 1:49.27, which lowered his former record by almost half a second and placed him fourth in the event. For his last event at the championships, he split a 50.34 for the backstroke leg of the 4×100 metre medley relay, helping win the gold medal in a Championships record and an Italian record time of 3:19.76. His medals contributed to Italy ranking second in the country medal table, in terms of total number of medals, and third in terms of total number of gold medals, as well as Europe ranking number one in the continent medal table both in terms of total number of gold medals and in terms of total number of medals.

=== 2022 ===
==== 2022 Mediterranean Games ====
2022 Mediterranean Games
Gold medal – first place	4×100 m medley	3:35.77
Gold medal – first place	200 m backstroke	1:57.62
Silver medal – second place	100 m backstroke	54.50
Bronze medal – third place	50 m backstroke	25.17

At the 2022 Mediterranean Games held in Oran, Algeria, Mora swam a 55.09 in the preliminaries of the 100 metre backstroke, qualifying for the final. In the final, he lowered his time, finishing second in 54.50 seconds and fifteen-hundredths of a second behind gold medalist Evangelos Makrygiannis of Greece. Two days later, he swam a 25.54 in the preliminaries of the 50 metre backstroke, advancing to the final ranking sixth. He won the bronze medal in the final with a time of 25.17 seconds. The following day, he split a 54.73 for the backstroke leg of the 4×100 metre medley relay in the final to help achieve a time of 3:35.77, with finals relay teammates Alessandro Pinzuti (breaststroke), Matteo Rivolta (butterfly), and Alessandro Bori (freestyle), and win the gold medal. In the preliminaries of the 200 metre backstroke on the final morning, he tied Matteo Restivo, also of Italy, for third rank and qualified for the final with his time of 2:00.66. He dropped over three seconds from his preliminaries time in the final, winning the gold medal with a time of 1:57.62.

==== 2022 European Aquatics Championships ====
Following his performances at the Mediterranean Games, Mora was named to the official Team Italy roster for the 2022 European Aquatics Championships in Rome in August. On day two of the 2022 European Aquatics Championships, held in Rome, Mora ranked eleventh in the preliminaries of the 200 metre backstroke, qualifying for the semifinals with a time of 1:59.18. He ranked fourth in the semifinals with a time of 1:57.62 and qualified for the final. In the final the following day, he placed sixth with a time of 1:57.43. On day four, he placed eleventh in the preliminaries of the 50 metre backstroke with a time of 25.18 seconds and did not advance to the semifinals as he was not one of the two fastest swimmers representing Italy. For the 100 metre backstroke, he finished with a personal best time of 54.41 seconds in the preliminaries, which ranked him as the third-fastest Italian, 0.04 seconds behind second-ranked Michele Lamberti, the seventh-fastest swimmer overall, and did not qualify him to the semifinals as he was not one of the two fastest Italians.

==== 48th Nico Sapio Trophy ====
At the 48th Nico Sapio Trophy, conducted in November 2022 in Genoa in short course metres, Mora set a new Italian record in the 200 metre backstroke on the first day of competition, lowering the national mark to a 1:48.72 and winning the event by 5.88 seconds. Earlier in the finals session, he won the gold medal in the 50 metre backstroke with a time of 23.30 seconds. He set a second Italian record on the second of two days of competition, achieving his first national record in the 100 metre backstroke with a personal best time of 49.37 seconds, which lowered the record 0.25 seconds from the 49.62 set by Thomas Ceccon in October and won him a third gold medal.

==== 2022 World Short Course Championships ====
2022 World Championships (SC)
Gold medal – first place	4×50 m medley	1:29.72 (WR)
Silver medal – second place	4×50 m mixed medley	1:36.01 (ER)
Silver medal – second place	100 m backstroke	49.04 (NR)
Bronze medal – third place	200 m backstroke	1:48.45 (NR)
Bronze medal – third place	4×100 m medley	3:19.06 (ER)

Day one of six at the 2022 World Short Course Championships, conducted at Melbourne Sports and Aquatic Centre in Melbourne, Australia, Mora qualified for the semifinals of the 100 metre backstroke on day one ranking seventh in the preliminaries with a time of 50.18 seconds. With a time of 49.57 seconds in the semifinals, he advanced to the final ranked third across the two semifinal heats. The next morning, he helped qualify the 4×50 metre mixed medley relay to the final ranking sixth with a backstroke time of 23.17 in the preliminaries. Dipping to a 22.59 for the backstroke leg of the relay in the final, he helped win the silver medal with a European record time of 1:36.01. He capped the day off with an Italian record of 49.04 seconds in the final of the 100 metre backstroke, which earned him the silver medal in the event.

On the third morning, Mora advanced from the preliminaries to the semifinals of the 50 metre backstroke ranking fifth with a time of 23.09 seconds. Tying his personal best time of 22.90 seconds in the evening semifinals, he qualified for the final also tied in rank with Dylan Carter of Trinidad and Tobago for fifth overall. In the final the following day, he achieves a new personal best time of 22.81 seconds and placed fourth, 0.07 seconds behind bronze medalist Kacper Stokowski of Poland. Commencing the final two-day stretch of competition, he swam a 23.61 for the backstroke leg of the 4×50 metre medley relay in the morning preliminaries on day five, helping qualify ranking first to the final in a time of 1:32.31. On the finals relay, he led-off the relay with a personal best time of 22.65 seconds to contribute to a gold medal-winning and new world record time of 1:29.72.

The sixth and final morning, Mora ranked fourth in a cluster of four swimmers to swim sub-1:50.00 times within 0.40 seconds of each other in the preliminaries of the 200 metre backstroke, advancing to the evening final with his time of 1:49.79. Finishing in a new Italian record time of 1:48.45 in the evening final, he won the bronze medal. He followed up with a 49.48 lead-off for the backstroke leg of the 4×100 metre medley relay, contributing to a bronze medal-winning European record time of 3:19.06. His medals contributed to a new record medal count of 16 total medals won by Italy at a single edition of the World Short Course Championships.

=== 2023 ===
With a time of 25.20 seconds in the final of the 50 metre backstroke on day one of the 2023 Italian National Championships, 13 April in Riccione, Mora placed fourth. On the second day, he won the bronze medal in the 100 metre backstroke with a time of 54.75 seconds, sharing the podium with Thomas Ceccon (gold medalist) and Michele Lamberti (silver medalist). In the 200 metre backstroke on day four, he won the silver medal with a time of 1:57.60, finishing 0.64 seconds behind gold medalist Matteo Restivo. In May, at the 2023 Mare Nostrum stop in Barcelona, Spain, he won the 100 metre backstroke with a time of 54.76 seconds. He followed up with a win in the 200 metre backstroke the next day in a time of 1:59.45.

== International championships (50 m) ==
Meet	50 backstroke	100 backstroke	200 backstroke	4×100 medley
Junior level
EG 2015	15th	28th	17th	
EJC 2016	20th	24th	37th	
Senior level
EC 2020	32nd	29th	14th	
MG 2022	3rd place, bronze medalist(s)	2nd place, silver medalist(s)	1st place, gold medalist(s)	1st place, gold medalist(s)
EC 2022	11th (h)	7th (h)	6th	

== International championships (25 m) ==
Meet	50 backstroke	100 backstroke	200 backstroke	4×50 medley	4×100 medley	4×50 mixed medley
EC 2015	34th	19th	10th		—N/a	
EC 2017	27th	14th	12th		—N/a	
EC 2019	DSQ	8th	7th	4th^{[a]}	—N/a	
EC 2021	6th	6th	2nd place, silver medalist(s)	(gold) ^{[a]}	—N/a	
WC 2021	2nd place, silver medalist(s)	8th	4th	3rd place, bronze medalist(s)	1st place, gold medalist(s)	3rd place, bronze medalist(s)
WC 2022	4th	2nd place, silver medalist(s)	3rd place, bronze medalist(s)	1st place, gold medalist(s)	3rd place, bronze medalist(s)	2nd place, silver medalist(s)

^{a} Mora swam only in the preliminary heats.

== Personal best times ==
=== Long course metres (50 m pool) ===
Event	Time		Meet	Location	Date	Ref
50 m backstroke	25.18	h	2022 European Aquatics Championships	Rome	14 August 2022	
100 m backstroke	54.41	h	2022 European Aquatics Championships	Rome	16 August 2022	
200 m backstroke	1:57.23	h	2021 Italian National Spring Championships	Riccione	1 April 2021	

Legend: h – preliminary heat

=== Short course metres (25 m pool) ===
Event	Time		Meet	Location	Date	Notes	Ref
50 m backstroke	22.65	r	2022 World Short Course Championships	Melbourne, Australia	17 December 2022		
100 m backstroke	49.04		2022 World Short Course Championships	Melbourne, Australia	14 December 2022	NR	
200 m backstroke	1:48.45		2022 World Short Course Championships	Melbourne, Australia	18 December 2022	NR	

Legend: NR – Italian record;
Records not set in finals: h – heat; sf – semifinal; r – relay 1st leg; rh – relay heat 1st leg; b – B final; † – en route to final mark; so – swim-off; tt – time trial

== World records ==
=== Short course metres (25 m pool) ===
No.	Event	Time	Meet	Location	Date	Age	Status	Ref
1	4×50 m medley	1:29.72	2022 World Short Course Championships	Melbourne, Australia	17 December 2022	24	Current	

== Continental and national records ==
=== Short course metres (25 m pool) ===
No.	Event	Time		Meet	Location	Date	Age	Type	Status	Ref
1	200 m backstroke	1:50.45		2019 Nico Sapio Trophy	Genoa	8 November 2019	21	NR	Former	
2	200 m backstroke (2)	1:50.17	sf	2021 European Short Course Championships	Kazan, Russia	6 November 2021	23	NR	Former	
3	200 m backstroke (3)	1:49.73		2021 European Short Course Championships	Kazan, Russia	7 November 2021	23	NR	Former	
4	200 m backstroke (4)	1:49.27		2021 World Short Course Championships	Abu Dhabi, United Arab Emirates	21 December 2021	23	NR	Former	
5	4×100 m medley	3:19.76		2021 World Short Course Championships	Abu Dhabi, United Arab Emirates	21 December 2021	23	NR	Former	
6	200 m backstroke (5)	1:48.72		48th Nico Sapio Trophy	Genoa	4 November 2022	24	NR	Former	
7	100 m backstroke	49.37		48th Nico Sapio Trophy	Genoa	5 November 2022	24	NR	Former	
8	4×50 m mixed medley	1:36.01		2022 World Short Course Championships	Melbourne, Australia	14 December 2022	24	ER, NR	Current	
9	100 m backstroke (2)	49.04		2022 World Short Course Championships	Melbourne, Australia	14 December 2022	24	NR	Current	
10	4×50 m medley	1:29.72		2022 World Short Course Championships	Melbourne, Australia	17 December 2022	24	ER, NR	Current	
11	200 m backstroke (6)	1:48.45		2022 World Short Course Championships	Melbourne, Australia	18 December 2022	24	NR	Current	
12	4×100 m medley (2)	3:19.06		2022 World Short Course Championships	Melbourne, Australia	18 December 2022	24	ER, NR	Current	

Legend: ER – European record; NR – Italian record;
Records not set in finals: h – heat; sf – semifinal; r – relay 1st leg; rh – relay heat 1st leg; b – B final; † – en route to final mark; so – swim-off; tt – time trial

== See also ==
- List of World Swimming Championships (25 m) medalists (men)
- List of European Short Course Swimming Championships medalists (men)
- List of Italian records in swimming

Records
Preceded by (Italy) Michele Lamberti, Nicolò Martinenghi, Marco Orsi, Lorenzo Zazzeri	Men's 4×50-metre medley relay world record holder 17 December 2022 – present With: Nicolò Martinenghi, Matteo Rivolta, Leonardo Deplano	Succeeded by Incumbents
