= 2022 FINA World Swimming Championships (25 m) – Men's 50 metre backstroke =

Swimming competition

Men's 50 metre backstroke at the 2022 FINA World Swimming Championships (25 m)
- Venue: Melbourne Sports and Aquatic Centre
- Location: Melbourne, Australia
- Dates: 15 December (heats and semifinals); 16 December (final)
- Competitors: 40 from 34 nations
- Winning time: 22.64

Medalists
gold medal	Ryan Murphy	United States
silver medal	Isaac Cooper	Australia
bronze medal	Kacper Stokowski	Poland

The Men's 50 metre backstroke competition of the 2022 FINA World Swimming Championships (25 m) was held on 15 and 16 December 2022.

== Records ==
Prior to the competition, the existing world and championship records were as follows.

World record	Florent Manaudou (FRA)	22.22	Doha, Qatar	6 December 2014
Competition record	Florent Manaudou (FRA)	22.22	Doha, Qatar	6 December 2014

== Results ==
=== Heats ===
The heats were started on 15 December at 11:19.

Rank	Heat	Lane	Name	Nationality	Time	Notes
1	4	5	Kacper Stokowski	Poland	22.78	Q, NR
2	6	2	Isaac Cooper	Australia	22.79	Q, OC
3	5	3	Pieter Coetze	South Africa	23.01	Q
4	5	4	Dylan Carter	Trinidad and Tobago	23.07	Q
5	5	5	Lorenzo Mora	Italy	23.09	Q
6	4	3	Javier Acevedo	Canada	23.10	Q, NR
7	3	8	Andrei Anghel	Romania	23.12	Q
8	6	5	Apostolos Christou	Greece	23.18	Q
8	6	8	Hunter Armstrong	United States	23.18	Q
10	6	4	Ryan Murphy	United States	23.22	Q
11	4	6	Ole Braunschweig	Germany	23.25	Q
11	6	3	Takeshi Kawamoto	Japan	23.25	Q
13	5	2	Tomáš Franta	Czech Republic	23.26	Q, NR
14	4	2	Marek Ulrich	Germany	23.28	Q
15	3	2	Ksawery Masiuk	Poland	23.35	Q
16	6	6	Ryosuke Irie	Japan	23.38	Q
17	4	8	Thierry Bollin	Switzerland	23.48	NR
18	5	8	Cameron Gray	New Zealand	23.49	
19	5	7	Simon Bucher	Austria	23.55	
20	3	3	Lamar Taylor	Bahamas	23.58	NR
20	5	6	Mewen Tomac	France	23.58	
22	4	7	Markus Lie	Norway	23.65	
23	2	2	João Costa	Portugal	23.80	
23	3	1	Bradley Woodward	Australia	23.80	
25	4	1	Ng Cheuk Yin	Hong Kong	23.83	
26	5	1	Wang Gukailai	China	23.97	
27	2	7	Chuang Mu-lun	Chinese Taipei	24.15	NR
28	3	5	Charles Hockin	Paraguay	24.29	
28	6	1	Rasim Oğulcan Gör	Turkey	24.29	
30	2	4	Maximillian Wilson	United States Virgin Islands	24.31	
31	3	6	Jerard Jacinto	Philippines	24.36	NR
32	6	7	Doruk Tekin	Turkey	24.63	
33	2	1	Ģirts Feldbergs	Latvia	24.67	
34	3	7	Armin Evert Lelle	Estonia	24.69	
35	1	3	Miguel Vásquez	Guatemala	25.31	NR
36	1	4	Abdellah Ardjoune	Algeria	25.71	
37	1	5	Kokoro Frost	Samoa	26.18	
38	1	6	Alan Koti Lopeti Uhi	Tonga	26.84	
39	1	7	Ayman Kelzi	Syria	27.19	NR
	2	6	Meiron Cheruti	Israel	Disqualified	
	1	2	Sheku Kamara	Sierra Leone	Did not start	
	2	3	Akalanka Peiris	Sri Lanka	Did not start	
	2	5	Ziyad Saleem	Sudan	Did not start	
	2	8	Yazan Al-Bawwab	Palestine	Did not start	
	3	4	Yeziel Morales	Puerto Rico	Did not start	
	4	4	Robert Glință	Romania	Did not start	

=== Semifinals ===
The semifinals were started on 15 December at 19:59.

Rank	Heat	Lane	Name	Nationality	Time	Notes
1	1	4	Isaac Cooper	Australia	22.52	Q, WJ, OC
2	2	4	Kacper Stokowski	Poland	22.74	Q, NR
2	1	2	Ryan Murphy	United States	22.74	Q
4	2	5	Pieter Coetze	South Africa	22.86	Q
5	1	5	Dylan Carter	Trinidad and Tobago	22.90	Q
5	2	3	Lorenzo Mora	Italy	22.90	Q
7	1	1	Marek Ulrich	Germany	23.03	Q
8	1	3	Javier Acevedo	Canada	23.05	QSO, WD, NR
8	1	6	Apostolos Christou	Greece	23.05	QSO
8	2	2	Hunter Armstrong	United States	23.05	QSO
11	2	7	Ole Braunschweig	Germany	23.08	
12	1	7	Takeshi Kawamoto	Japan	23.19	
13	2	8	Ksawery Masiuk	Poland	23.29	
14	1	8	Ryosuke Irie	Japan	23.49	
	2	1	Tomáš Franta	Czech Republic	Disqualified	
	2	6	Andrei Anghel	Romania	Disqualified	

==== Swim-off ====
The swim-off was held on 16 December at 12:55.

Rank	Lane	Name	Nationality	Time	Notes
1	4	Apostolos Christou	Greece	23.15	Q
2	5	Hunter Armstrong	United States	23.30	

=== Final ===
The final was held on 16 December at 21:11.

Rank	Lane	Name	Nationality	Time	Notes
1st place, gold medalist(s)	5	Ryan Murphy	United States	22.64	
2nd place, silver medalist(s)	4	Isaac Cooper	Australia	22.73	
3rd place, bronze medalist(s)	3	Kacper Stokowski	Poland	22.74	=NR
4	7	Lorenzo Mora	Italy	22.81	
5	6	Pieter Coetze	South Africa	22.84	AF
6	8	Apostolos Christou	Greece	23.10	
6	2	Dylan Carter	Trinidad and Tobago	23.12	
8	1	Marek Ulrich	Germany	23.37	
