= 2022 FINA World Swimming Championships (25 m) – Men's 100 metre backstroke =

Swimming competition

Men's 100 metre backstroke at the 2022 FINA World Swimming Championships (25 m)
- Venue: Melbourne Sports and Aquatic Centre
- Location: Melbourne, Australia
- Dates: 13 December (heats and semifinals); 14 December (final)
- Competitors: 41 from 35 nations
- Winning time: 48.50 CR

Medalists
| gold medal | Ryan Murphy | United States |
| silver medal | Lorenzo Mora | Italy |
| bronze medal | Isaac Cooper | Australia |

The Men's 100 metre backstroke competition of the 2022 FINA World Swimming Championships (25 m) will be held on 13 and 14 December 2022.

== Records ==
Prior to the competition, the existing world and championship records were as follows.

| World record | Coleman Stewart (USA) | 48.33 | Naples, Italy | 29 August 2021 |
| Competition record | Stanislav Donetc (RUS) | 48.95 | Dubai, United Arab Emirates | 19 December 2010 |

== Results ==
=== Heats ===
The heats were started on 13 December at 11:44.

| Rank | Heat | Lane | Name | Nationality | Time | Notes |
|---|---|---|---|---|---|---|
| 1 | 4 | 4 | Ryan Murphy | United States | 49.34 | Q |
| 2 | 5 | 3 | Mewen Tomac | France | 49.99 | Q |
| 3 | 6 | 3 | Apostolos Christou | Greece | 50.01 | Q |
| 4 | 3 | 4 | Thierry Bollin | Switzerland | 50.10 | Q, NR |
| 5 | 6 | 5 | Kacper Stokowski | Poland | 50.14 | Q |
| 6 | 3 | 2 | Isaac Cooper | Australia | 50.16 | Q |
| 7 | 5 | 4 | Lorenzo Mora | Italy | 50.18 | Q |
| 8 | 6 | 6 | Yohann Ndoye-Brouard | France | 50.21 | Q |
| 9 | 6 | 2 | Pieter Coetze | South Africa | 50.26 | Q |
| 10 | 4 | 6 | Ole Braunschweig | Germany | 50.37 | Q |
| 10 | 5 | 5 | Ryosuke Irie | Japan | 50.37 | Q |
| 12 | 5 | 6 | Tomáš Franta | Czech Republic | 50.60 | Q |
| 13 | 4 | 3 | Luke Greenbank | Great Britain | 50.72 | Q |
| 14 | 5 | 7 | Ksawery Masiuk | Poland | 50.84 | Q |
| 15 | 4 | 2 | Markus Lie | Norway | 50.89 | Q, NR |
| 16 | 3 | 7 | Marek Ulrich | Germany | 50.92 | Q |
| 17 | 4 | 8 | Hunter Armstrong | United States | 50.93 | |
| 18 | 4 | 5 | Javier Acevedo | Canada | 50.97 | |
| 19 | 4 | 7 | Daiki Yanagawa | Japan | 50.99 | |
| 20 | 4 | 1 | Ng Cheuk Yin | Hong Kong | 51.30 | NR |
| 21 | 3 | 1 | João Costa | Portugal | 51.34 | |
| 22 | 6 | 7 | Bradley Woodward | Australia | 51.35 | |
| 23 | 5 | 8 | Wang Gukailai | China | 51.85 | |
| 24 | 6 | 1 | Zac Dell | New Zealand | 51.98 | |
| 25 | 5 | 2 | Armin Evert Lelle | Estonia | 52.39 | |
| 26 | 3 | 5 | Ģirts Feldbergs | Latvia | 52.44 | |
| 27 | 6 | 8 | Rasmin Oğulcan Gör | Turkey | 52.54 | |
| 28 | 6 | 4 | Robert Glinta | Romania | 52.65 | |
| 29 | 2 | 6 | Chuang Mu-lun | Chinese Taipei | 52.79 | |
| 30 | 5 | 1 | Yeziel Morales | Puerto Rico | 52.92 | |
| 31 | 3 | 6 | Kaloyan Levterov | Bulgaria | 53.22 | |
| 32 | 3 | 8 | Maximillan Wilson | United States Virgin Islands | 53.23 | |
| 33 | 3 | 3 | Charles Hockin | Paraguay | 53.88 | |
| 34 | 2 | 4 | Merdan Ataýew | Turkmenistan | 55.04 | |
| 35 | 2 | 3 | Yazan Al-Bawwab | Palestine | 55.23 | |
| 36 | 2 | 5 | Abdellah Ardjoune | Algeria | 55.54 | |
| 37 | 2 | 7 | Alan Koti Lopeti Uhi | Tonga | 57.39 | |
| 38 | 2 | 2 | Abdalla El-Ghamry | Qatar | 58.72 | |
| 39 | 1 | 4 | Carel Van Melvin Irakoze | Burundi | 1:02.86 | |
| 40 | 1 | 5 | Mohamed Rihan Shiham | Maldives | 1:07.35 | |
| | 2 | 1 | Mohamad Zubaid | Kuwait | Disqualified | |
| | 1 | 3 | Abobakr Abass | Sudan | Did not start | |

=== Semifinals ===
The semifinals were started on 13 December at 20:38.

| Rank | Heat | Lane | Name | Nationality | Time | Notes |
|---|---|---|---|---|---|---|
| 1 | 2 | 4 | Ryan Murphy | United States | 49.17 | Q |
| 2 | 2 | 3 | Kacper Stokowski | Poland | 49.33 | Q |
| 3 | 2 | 6 | Lorenzo Mora | Italy | 49.57 | Q |
| 4 | 2 | 5 | Apostolos Christou | Greece | 49.66 | Q, NR |
| 5 | 1 | 6 | Yohann Ndoye-Brouard | France | 49.78 | Q |
| 6 | 2 | 2 | Pieter Coetze | South Africa | 49.85 | Q, AF |
| 7 | 1 | 3 | Isaac Cooper | Australia | 50.01 | Q |
| 7 | 1 | 4 | Mewen Tomac | France | 50.01 | Q |
| 9 | 2 | 7 | Ryosuke Irie | Japan | 50.08 | |
| 10 | 1 | 5 | Thierry Bollin | Switzerland | 50.33 | |
| 11 | 1 | 7 | Tomáš Franta | Czech Republic | 50.39 | NR |
| 12 | 1 | 2 | Ole Braunschweig | Germany | 50.55 | |
| 13 | 2 | 8 | Markus Lie | Norway | 50.67 | NR |
| 14 | 2 | 1 | Luke Greenbank | Great Britain | 50.81 | |
| 15 | 1 | 1 | Ksawery Masiuk | Poland | 51.01 | |
| 16 | 1 | 8 | Marek Ulrich | Germany | 51.12 | |

=== Final ===
The final was held on 14 December at 18:07.

| Rank | Lane | Name | Nationality | Time | Notes |
|---|---|---|---|---|---|
| 1st place, gold medalist(s) | 4 | Ryan Murphy | United States | 48.50 | CR |
| 2nd place, silver medalist(s) | 3 | Lorenzo Mora | Italy | 49.04 | NR |
| 3rd place, bronze medalist(s) | 1 | Isaac Cooper | Australia | 49.52 | |
| 4 | 7 | Pieter Coetze | South Africa | 49.60 | AF |
| 5 | 6 | Apostolos Christou | Greece | 49.68 | |
| 6 | 5 | Kacper Stokowski | Poland | 49.74 | |
| 7 | 8 | Mewen Tomac | France | 49.94 | |
| 8 | 2 | Yohann Ndoye-Brouard | France | 50.01 | |
