= Swimming at the 2022 Mediterranean Games – Men's 50 metre backstroke =

Men's swimming competition

Men's 50 metre backstroke at the 2022 Mediterranean Games
- Location: Bir El Djir, Algeria
- Dates: 3 July
- Competitors: 18 from 11 nations
- Winning time: 25.00

Medalists
gold medal	Simone Stefanì	Italy
silver medal	Juan Segura	Spain
bronze medal	Lorenzo Mora	Italy

The men's 50 metre backstroke competition at the 2022 Mediterranean Games was held on 3 July 2022 at the Aquatic Center of the Olympic Complex in Bir El Djir.

== Records ==
Prior to this competition, the existing world and Mediterranean Games records were as follows:

World record	Hunter Armstrong (USA)	23.71	Greensboro, United States	28 April 2022
Mediterranean Games record	Aschwin Wildeboer (ESP)	24.73	Pescara, Italy	27 June 2009

== Results ==
=== Heats ===
The heats were started at 10:54.

Rank	Heat	Lane	Name	Nationality	Time	Notes
1	2	4	Simone Stefanì	Italy	25.17	Q
2	2	6	Georgios Spanoudakis	Greece	25.20	Q
3	2	3	Manuel Martos	Spain	25.41	Q
4	1	4	Juan Segura	Spain	25.42	Q
5	1	5	Evangelos Makrygiannis	Greece	25.48	Q
6	3	5	Lorenzo Mora	Italy	25.54	Q
7	2	5	Doruk Tekin	Turkey	25.75	Q
8	3	3	João Costa	Portugal	25.78	Q
9	3	4	Alexis Santos	Portugal	25.91	
10	1	6	Mathys Chouchaoui	France	25.94	
11	1	3	Abdellah Ardjoune	Algeria	25.98	
12	2	2	Sofoklis Mougis	Cyprus	26.50	
13	3	7	Christophe Brun	France	26.54	
14	3	2	Filippos Iakovidis	Cyprus	26.55	
15	1	2	Mehdi Nazim Benbara	Algeria	26.77	
16	1	7	Patrick Pelegrina	Andorra	27.46	NR
17	2	7	Andrej Stojanovski	North Macedonia	27.71	NR
18	3	1	Frenkli Vogli	Albania	27.99	
	3	6	Sašo Boškan	Slovenia	Did not start	

=== Final ===
The final was held at 18:19.

Rank	Lane	Name	Nationality	Time	Notes
1st place, gold medalist(s)	4	Simone Stefanì	Italy	25.00	
2nd place, silver medalist(s)	6	Juan Segura	Spain	25.09	
3rd place, bronze medalist(s)	7	Lorenzo Mora	Italy	25.17	
4	5	Georgios Spanoudakis	Greece	25.19	
5	2	Evangelos Makrygiannis	Greece	25.32	
6	3	Manuel Martos	Spain	25.42	
7	8	João Costa	Portugal	25.62	
8	1	Doruk Tekin	Turkey	25.69	
