= Swimming at the 2018 European Aquatics Championships – Men's 4 × 100 metre medley relay =

Men's 4 × 100 metre medley relay at the 2018 European Aquatics Championships
- Venue: Tollcross International Swimming Centre
- Dates: 9 August
- Competitors: 92 from 20 nations
- Teams: 20
- Winning time: 3:30.44

Medalists
gold medal	Nicholas Pyle; Adam Peaty; James Guy; Duncan Scott; Brodie Williams; James Wilby; Jacob Peters	Great Britain
silver medal	Kliment Kolesnikov; Anton Chupkov; Egor Kuimov; Vladimir Morozov; Evgeny Rylov; Kirill Prigoda; Aleksandr Sadovnikov; Vladislav Grinev	Russia
bronze medal	Christian Diener; Fabian Schwingenschlögl; Marius Kusch; Damian Wierling; Jan-Philip Glania; Philip Heintz	Germany

The Men's 4 × 100 metre medley relay competition of the 2018 European Aquatics Championships was held on 9 August 2018.

== Records ==
Prior to the competition, the existing world and championship records were as follows.

	Team	Time	Location	Date
World record	United States	3:27.28	Rome	2 August 2009
European record	Germany	3:28.58	Rome	2 August 2009
Championship record	France	3:31.32	Budapest	15 August 2010

The following new records were set during this competition.

Date	Event	Nation	Time	Record
9 August	Final	Great Britain	3:30.44	CR

== Results ==
=== Heats ===
The heats were started at 09:48.

Rank	Heat	Lane	Nation	Swimmers	Time	Notes
1	3	6	Russia	Evgeny Rylov (52.66); Kirill Prigoda (59.39); Aleksandr Sadovnikov (52.41); Vladislav Grinev (48.62)	3:33.08	Q
2	1	5	Hungary	Gábor Balog (54.69); Dávid Horváth (1:00.92); László Cseh (51.67); Dominik Kozma (48.22)	3:35.50	Q
3	2	7	Great Britain	Brodie Williams (55.08); James Wilby (59.13); Jacob Peters (52.35); Duncan Scott (48.96)	3:35.52	Q
4	2	4	Germany	Jan-Philip Glania (54.53); Fabian Schwingenschlögl (59.47); Philip Heintz (52.44); Marius Kusch (49.20)	3:35.64	Q
5	2	2	Netherlands	Nyls Korstanje (55.62); Arno Kamminga (59.58); Joeri Verlinden (52.01); Stan Pijnenburg (48.67)	3:35.88	Q
6	2	8	Belarus	Mikita Tsmyh (55.62); Ilya Shymanovich (59.00); Yauhen Tsurkin (51.45); Viktar Krasochka (49.99)	3:36.06	Q
7	3	8	Lithuania	Danas Rapšys (54.80); Andrius Šidlauskas (1:00.13); Deividas Margevičius (52.90); Simonas Bilis (48.36)	3:36.19	Q
8	1	3	Sweden	Gustav Hökfelt (55.06); Erik Persson (1:00.18); Simon Sjödin (53.28); Christoffer Carlsen (48.25)	3:36.77	Q
9	2	0	Italy	Thomas Ceccon (55.17); Alessandro Pinzuti (1:00.15); Matteo Rivolta (52.91); Luca Dotto (49.01)	3:37.24	
10	2	3	Greece	Apostolos Christou (54.41); Ioannis Karpouzlis (1:01.79); Andreas Vazaios (52.94); Odyssefs Melanidis (48.96)	3:38.10	
11	2	6	Switzerland	Thierry Bollin (55.71); Yannick Käser (1:00.88); Noè Ponti (53.18); Nils Liess (49.44)	3:39.21	
12	3	2	Poland	Radosław Kawęcki (55.08); Michal Stolarski (1:01.87); Michal Chudy (53.22); Kacper Majchrzak (49.16)	3:39.33	
13	2	1	Turkey	Metin Aydın (55.96); Berkay Öğretir (1:00.80); Kaan Türker Ayar (53.56); Yalım Acımış (49.41)	3:39.73	
14	3	5	Austria	Bernhard Reitshammer (54.90); Christopher Rothbauer (1:01.39); Xaver Gschwentner (54.86); Alexander Trampitsch (49.04)	3:40.19	
15	3	4	Israel	Yakov Toumarkin (55.24); Itay Goldfaden (1:03.21); Marcus Schlesinger (53.67); Ziv Kalontarov (48.57)	3:40.69	
16	2	5	Estonia	Ralf Tribuntsov (55.33); Martin Allikvee (1:01.56); Kregor Zirk (53.21); Daniel Zaitsev (50.62)	3:40.72	
17	3	7	Croatia	Anton Lončar (55.99); Nikola Obrovac (1:02.15); Nikola Miljenić (53.73); Bruno Blašković (48.99)	3:40.86	
18	3	3	Slovakia	Adam Černek (57.73); Tomáš Klobučník (1:02.38); Ádám Halás (55.12); Jozef Beňo (54.34)	3:49.57	
19	3	0	Finland	Niko Mäkelä (58.49); William Wihanto (1:04.93); Sergey Kuznetsov (55.49); Anton Herrala (51.18)	3:50.09	
	3	1	Ireland	Conor Ferguson (55.08); Darragh Greene; Brendan Hyland; Shane Ryan	Disqualified	

=== Final ===
The final was started at 17:58.

Rank	Lane	Nation	Swimmers	Time	Notes
1st place, gold medalist(s)	3	Great Britain	Nicholas Pyle (54.58); Adam Peaty (57.60); James Guy (50.91); Duncan Scott (47.35)	3:30.44	CR
2nd place, silver medalist(s)	4	Russia	Kliment Kolesnikov (52.77); Anton Chupkov (1:00.40); Egor Kuimov (51.42); Vladimir Morozov (47.44)	3:32.03	
3rd place, bronze medalist(s)	6	Germany	Christian Diener (54.19); Fabian Schwingenschlögl (1:00.00); Marius Kusch (51.58); Damian Wierling (47.75)	3:33.52	
4	1	Lithuania	Danas Rapšys (54.80); Andrius Šidlauskas (58.80); Deividas Margevičius (52.29); Simonas Bilis (47.81)	3:33.70	
5	5	Hungary	Richárd Bohus (54.57); Dávid Horváth (1:01.20); Kristóf Milák (51.30); Nándor Németh (47.17)	3:34.24	
6	7	Belarus	Mikita Tsmyh (54.88); Ilya Shymanovich (59.14); Yauhen Tsurkin (51.12); Viktar Krasochka (49.65)	3:34.79	
7	2	Netherlands	Nyls Korstanje (55.48); Arno Kamminga (59.68); Joeri Verlinden (51.80); Stan Pijnenburg (48.28)	3:35.24	
8	8	Sweden	Gustav Hökfelt (54.87); Erik Persson (1:00.23); Simon Sjödin (52.58); Christoffer Carlsen (48.32)	3:36.00	
