= Kane Follows =

New Zealand Olympian

Personal information
- Nationality: New Zealand
- Born: 27 May 1997 (age 29) Auckland, New Zealand
- Height: 1.97 m (6 ft 6 in)

Sport
- Sport: Swimming
- Strokes: Backstroke
- Club: Neptune Swim Club
- Coach: Lars Humer

Kane Follows (born 27 May 1997) is a New Zealand swimmer who competed at the 2024 Summer Olympics.

Follows was born and raised in Auckland. He attended One Tree Hill College in Auckland and the University of Hawai'i.

== Swimming career ==
Follows currently lives and trains in Dunedin under Lars Humer. Previous to training in Dunedin with the Neptune Swim Club, Follows also trained at Mt Eden Swimming, North Shore Swimming Club and the University of Hawai'i.

He first represented New Zealand at a senior level in the 2022 FINA World Swimming Championships (25 m) in Melbourne with a 14th-place finish in the 200 metres backstroke in a time of 1:53.11.

At the 2024 New Zealand Olympic Trials, Follows won the 200 metres backstroke breaking the New Zealand record (set by Gareth Kean in 2012), with a time of 1:57.13 and qualified for the Olympics.

At the 2024 Summer Olympics, Follows finished 21st in the 200 metres backstroke with a time of 1:58.63 and 33rd in the 100 metres backstroke.
