= 2022 FINA World Swimming Championships (25 m) – Men's 200 metre backstroke =

Swimming competition

Men's 200 metre backstroke at the 2022 FINA World Swimming Championships (25 m)
- Venue: Melbourne Sports and Aquatic Centre
- Location: Melbourne, Australia
- Dates: 18 December (heats and final)
- Competitors: 25 from 21 nations
- Winning time: 1:47.41

Medalists
gold medal	Ryan Murphy	United States
silver medal	Shaine Casas	United States
bronze medal	Lorenzo Mora	Italy

The Men's 200 metre backstroke competition of the 2022 FINA World Swimming Championships (25 m) was held on 18 December 2022.

== Records ==
Prior to the competition, the existing world and championship records were as follows.

World record	Mitch Larkin (AUS)	1:45.63	Sydney, Australia	27 November 2015
Competition record	Ryan Lochte (USA)	1:46.68	Dubai, United Arab Emirates	19 December 2010

== Results ==
=== Heats ===
The heats were started at 12:03.

Rank	Heat	Lane	Name	Nationality	Time	Notes
1	3	4	Shaine Casas	United States	1:49.46	Q
2	4	3	Mewen Tomac	France	1:49.61	Q
3	4	4	Ryan Murphy	United States	1:49.71	Q
4	4	5	Lorenzo Mora	Italy	1:49.79	Q
5	4	6	Yohann Ndoye-Brouard	France	1:50.12	Q
6	3	3	Luke Greenbank	Great Britain	1:50.34	Q
7	2	5	Ryota Naito	Japan	1:50.78	Q
8	2	4	Radosław Kawęcki	Poland	1:50.97	Q
9	2	6	Bradley Woodward	Australia	1:51.46	
10	2	2	Pieter Coetze	South Africa	1:51.51	
11	3	2	Ty Hartwell	Australia	1:51.95	
12	2	3	Hugo González	Spain	1:52.02	
13	4	7	Yakov Toumarkin	Israel	1:53.03	
14	3	1	Kane Follows	New Zealand	1:53.11	
15	2	7	Tao Guannan	China	1:53.14	
16	3	8	João Costa	Portugal	1:53.54	
17	3	7	Kacper Stokowski	Poland	1:53.88	
18	2	1	Hayden Kwan	Hong Kong	1:53.95	NR
19	4	1	Yeziel Morales	Puerto Rico	1:53.99	
20	4	2	Armin Evert Lelle	Estonia	1:54.16	
21	4	8	Kaloyan Levterov	Bulgaria	1:55.98	
22	1	6	Merdan Ataýew	Turkmenistan	1:59.49	NR
23	1	4	Abdellah Ardjoune	Algeria	1:59.78	
24	2	8	Ratthawit Thammananthachote	Thailand	2:00.85	
	3	5	Javier Acevedo	Canada	Disqualified	
	1	2	Bede Aitu	Cook Islands	Did not start	
	1	3	Chuang Mu-lun	Chinese Taipei	Did not start	
	1	5	Ziyad Saleem	Sudan	Did not start	
	3	6	Daiki Yanagawa	Japan	Did not start	

=== Final ===
The final was held at 20:22.

Rank	Lane	Name	Nationality	Time	Notes
1st place, gold medalist(s)	3	Ryan Murphy	United States	1:47.41	
2nd place, silver medalist(s)	4	Shaine Casas	United States	1:48.01	
3rd place, bronze medalist(s)	6	Lorenzo Mora	Italy	1:48.45	NR
4	2	Yohann Ndoye-Brouard	France	1:49.23	NR
5	7	Luke Greenbank	Great Britain	1:49.79	
6	5	Mewen Tomac	France	1:49.93	
7	8	Radosław Kawęcki	Poland	1:50.33	
8	1	Ryota Naito	Japan	1:51.67	
