= Anastasia Avdeeva =

Russian swimmer

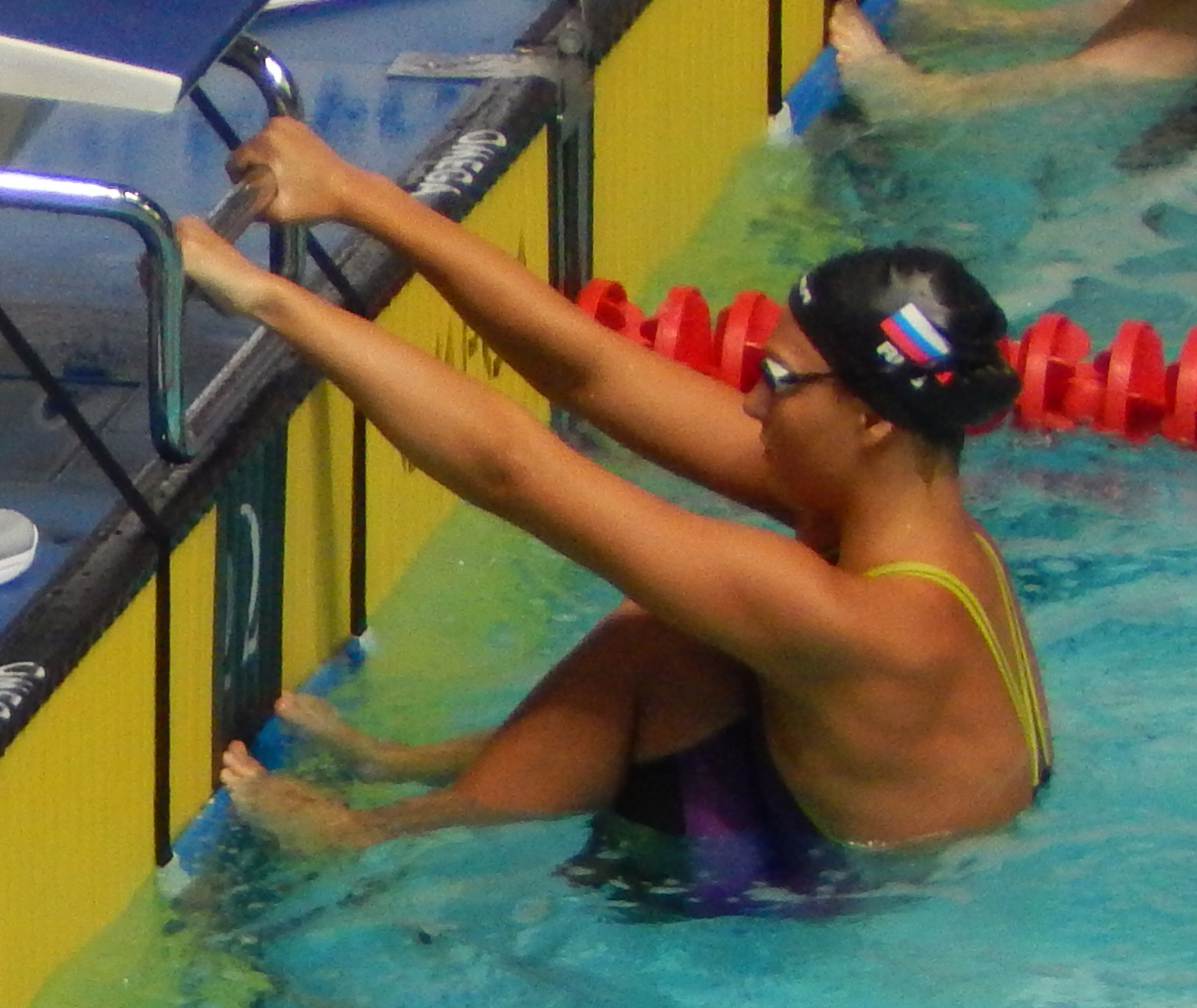
- Anastasia Avdeeva in 2018

Personal information
- Nationality: Russian
- Born: 8 October 2001 (age 24)

Sport
- Sport: Swimming
Medal record
Representing Russia
European Junior Championships
Silver medal – second place	2017 Netanya	200m backstroke

Anastasia Avdeeva (born 8 October 2001) is a Russian swimmer. She competed in the women's 200 metre backstroke at the 2019 World Aquatics Championships.

In 2017, she won the silver medal in the girls' 200 metre backstroke at the 2017 European Junior Swimming Championships held in Netanya, Israel.
