= Nicholas Pyle =

British swimmer

Personal information
- Full name: Nicholas Edward Pyle
- National team: Great Britain
- Born: 17 December 2000 (age 25) Newcastle Upon Tyne

Sport
- Sport: Swimming
- Strokes: Backstroke
- Club: Newcastle Swim Team
- Coach: Steven Tigg
Medal record
Men's swimming
Representing Great Britain
European Championships (LC)
Gold medal – first place	2018 Glasgow	4×100 m medley
Gold medal – first place	2018 Glasgow	4×100 m mixed medley

Nicholas Edward Pyle (born 17 December 2000) is an English swimmer who specialises in backstroke. He has won gold representing Great Britain at the European Championships.

== Background ==
Pyle is from Newcastle upon Tyne, where he attended St Cuthbert's High School. He was a member of Newcastle Swim Team. He finished his A-level in 2019, and moved to University of Stirling to train with his teammates.

== Career ==
In 2018, Pyle won his first gold at the British Championships held in Edinburgh in the 50 metre backstroke. He won a bronze in the 100 metre backstroke at the European Junior Championships in Helsinki in a personal best time of 54.69.

Pyle had his debut on a senior British team at the 2018 European Championships in Glasgow. He was part of the British quartet with Adam Peaty, James Guy and Duncan Scott in the final of the men's 4 × 100 metre medley relay which they won, earning Pyle his first senior European title. He won a further gold in the 4×100 metre mixed medley relay as part of the team, only swimming in the preliminaries but not in the final.
