= Swimming at the 2022 Mediterranean Games – Men's 200 metre backstroke =

Men's 200 metre backstroke at the 2022 Mediterranean Games
- Location: Bir El Djir, Algeria
- Dates: 5 July
- Competitors: 15 from 10 nations
- Winning time: 1:57.62

Medalists
gold medal	Lorenzo Mora	Italy
silver medal	Matteo Restivo	Italy
bronze medal	Christophe Brun	France

The men's 200 metre backstroke competition at the 2022 Mediterranean Games was held on 5 July 2022 at the Aquatic Center of the Olympic Complex in Bir El Djir.

== Records ==
Prior to this competition, the existing world and Mediterranean Games records were as follows:

World record	Aaron Peirsol (USA)	1:51.92	Rome, Italy	31 July 2009
Mediterranean Games record	Aschwin Wildeboer (ESP)	1:54.96	Pescara, Italy	28 June 2009

== Results ==
=== Heats ===
The heats were started at 11:31.

Rank	Heat	Lane	Name	Nationality	Time	Notes
1	2	6	Christophe Brun	France	1:59.78	Q
2	1	7	Anže Ferš Eržen	Slovenia	2:00.35	Q
3	2	5	Lorenzo Mora	Italy	2:00.66	Q
3	1	5	Matteo Restivo	Italy	2:00.66	Q
5	1	2	Diego Mira	Spain	2:00.96	Q
6	1	6	Primož Šenica Pavletič	Slovenia	2:01.32	Q
7	2	2	Mathys Chouchaoui	France	2:01.47	Q
8	2	7	Javier Arauz	Spain	2:01.64	Q
9	2	3	Evangelos Makrygiannis	Greece	2:01.75	
10	2	4	Francisco Santos	Portugal	2:02.13	
11	1	4	Berke Saka	Turkey	2:02.74	
12	1	3	João Costa	Portugal	2:03.23	
13	2	1	Abdellah Ardjoune	Algeria	2:04.18	
14	1	1	Ognjen Marić	Croatia	2:04.29	
15	2	8	Frenkli Vogli	Albania	2:14.20	

=== Final ===
The final was held at 19:18.

Rank	Lane	Name	Nationality	Time	Notes
1st place, gold medalist(s)	3	Lorenzo Mora	Italy	1:57.62	
2nd place, silver medalist(s)	6	Matteo Restivo	Italy	1:57.77	
3rd place, bronze medalist(s)	4	Christophe Brun	France	1:58.40	
4	1	Mathys Chouchaoui	France	2:00.11	
5	7	Primož Šenica Pavletič	Slovenia	2:00.51	
6	2	Diego Mira	Spain	2:00.63	
7	8	Javier Arauz	Spain	2:00.83	
8	5	Anže Ferš Eržen	Slovenia	2:00.85	
