= Alessandro Pinzuti =

Italian swimmer (born 1999)

Personal information
- National team: Italy
- Born: 10 May 1999 (age 27) Montepulciano, Italy

Sport
- Sport: Swimming
- Strokes: Breaststroke
- Club: Centro Sportivo Esercito
Medal record
Men's swimming
Representing Italy
Event	1st	2nd	3rd
European Championships (LC)	0	0	1
European Championships (SC)	0	1	0
Mediterranean Games	1	0	1
Total	1	1	2
European Championships (LC)
Bronze medal – third place	2020 Budapest	4×100 m medley
European Championships (SC)
Silver medal – second place	2021 Kazan	4×50 m mixed medley
Mediterranean Games
Gold medal – first place	2022 Oran	4×100 m medley
Bronze medal – third place	2022 Oran	100 m breaststroke
World Junior Championships
Silver medal – second place	2017 Indianapolis	50 m breaststroke
Silver medal – second place	2017 Indianapolis	4×100 m medley
European Junior Championships
Silver medal – second place	2017 Netanya	50 m breaststroke
Bronze medal – third place	2017 Netanya	100 m breaststroke
World University Games
Silver medal – second place	2021 Chengdu	4×100 m medley
Bronze medal – third place	2021 Chengdu	50 m breaststroke
Bronze medal – third place	2021 Chengdu	4×100 m mixed medley

Alessandro Pinzuti (born 10 May 1999) is an Italian competitive swimmer. He won a gold medal in the 4×100 metre medley relay and the bronze medal in the 100 metre breaststroke at the 2022 Mediterranean Games. At the 2020 European Aquatics Championships, he won a bronze medal as part of the 4×100 metre medley relay, placed seventh in the 100 metre breaststroke and eighth in the 50 metre breaststroke. At the junior level, he won silver medals in the 50 metre breaststroke at the 2017 World Junior Championships and the 2017 European Junior Championships as well as a bronze medal in the 100 metre breaststroke at the 2017 European Junior Championships.

== Background ==
Pinzuti was born 10 May 1999 in Montepulciano, Italy. At the club level, he swims and competes for Centro Sportivo Esercito and In Sport RR.

== Career ==
=== 2017–2019 ===
==== 2017 European Junior Championships ====
At the 2017 European Junior Swimming Championships in Netanya, Israel, Pinzuti won the silver medal in the 50 metre breaststroke with a time of 27.51 seconds, finishing 0.27 seconds behind the gold medalist in the event and fellow Italian Nicolò Martinenghi. He won the bronze medal in the 100 metre breaststroke with a time of 1:01.28 in the final and placed 21st in the 50 metre butterfly in 24.99 seconds.

==== 2017 World Junior Championships ====
2017 World Junior Championships
Silver medal – second place	50 m breaststroke	27.19
Bronze medal – third place	4×100 m medley	3:36.44 (h)

On 24 August 2017, Pinzuti placed fifth in the final of the 100 metre breaststroke at the 2017 World Junior Swimming Championships in Indianapolis, United States with a time of 1:01.01, finishing 0.77 seconds behind the bronze medalist in the event Michael Andrew of the United States. Four days later, he split a 1:00.15 for the breaststroke portion of the 4×100 metre medley relay in the prelims heats, helping qualify the relay to the final ranking first. In the finals session later in the day, he won a silver medal in the 50 metre breaststroke with a time of 27.19 seconds, finishing just 0.09 seconds behind first-place finisher Nicolò Martinenghi. For the final of the 4×100 metre medley relay, Nicolò Martinenghi substituted in for him for the breaststroke and Pinzuti won a bronze medal when the finals relay finished third in 3:36.44.

==== 2018 European Aquatics Championships ====
In August 2018, Pinzuti placed twelfth in the 100 metre breaststroke with a time of 1:00.28 at the 2018 European Aquatics Championships, held at Tollcross International Swimming Centre in Glasgow, Scotland. In his next event, he swam a 27.32 and placed ninth for the semifinals of the 50 metre breaststroke. Finishing competing at the Championships, Pinzuti placed ninth in the 4×100 metre medley relay with relay teammates Thomas Ceccon, Matteo Rivolta, and Luca Dotto, swimming a 1:00:15 for the breaststroke leg of the relay to help finish in 3:37.24.

==== 2019 World University Games ====
Competing at Piscina Felice Scandone in Naples as part of the Italian team for the 2019 World University Games, Pinzuti reached the semifinals stage of competition in both of his individual events, placing ninth overall in the 50 metre breaststroke with a time of 27.78 seconds and 14th in the 100 metre breaststroke in 1:01.37.

=== 2021–2022 ===
==== 2020 European Aquatics Championships ====
2020 European Championships
Bronze medal – third place	4×100 m medley	3:29.93 (h)

Pinzuti placed seventh in the final of the 100 metre breaststroke at the 2020 European Aquatics Championships, held at Danube Arena in Budapest, Hungary, with a time of 59.50 seconds after swimming a personal best time in the semifinals of 59.20 seconds. His time of 59.20 registered Pinzuti as the 14th-fastest performer in the event for the entirety of the 2021 year. For the 50 metre breaststroke, he placed eighth in the final with a 27.54 after swimming a personal best time of 27.11 seconds and ranking fifth in the semifinals. In his final event of the Championships, Pinzuti split a 59.60 for the breaststroke leg of the 4×100 metre medley relay in the prelims heats and won a bronze medal for his contributions when the finals relay placed third with a time of 3:29.93.

==== 2021 International Swimming League ====
For the 2021 International Swimming League, PInzuti competed representing the Tokyo Frog Kings, Pinzuti placed fourth in the 100 metre breaststroke at the eighth match of the regular season with a time of 57.03 seconds. In the tenth match of the season, he placed second in the 50 metre breaststroke in 26.07 seconds. With his time of 26.07 seconds, Pinzuti tied in rank for the 14th-fastest swimmer in the short course 50 metre breaststroke for the 2021 year. His performances across five matches earning him 61 Most Valuable Player points ranked him at number 290 out of 488 competitors since the International Swimming League began in 2019.

==== 2021 European Short Course Championships ====
2021 European Championships
Silver medal – second place	4×50 m mixed medley	1:36.39 (h)

At the 2021 European Short Course Championships held at the Palace of Water Sports in Kazan, Russia in November, Pinzuti ranked ninth in the prelims heats of the 100 metre breaststroke on day two with a time of 57.58 seconds and did not advance to the semifinals as he was the third-fastest swimmer representing Italy in the event. Three days later, the same thing happened in the 50 metre breaststroke, this time he was the third-fastest Italian, in a time of 26.21 seconds, ranked sixth overall and did not advance to the semifinals. The following day, he won a silver medal as part of the 4×50 metre mixed medley relay, swimming a 26.03 for the 50 metre breaststroke portion of the relay in the prelims heats and winning a silver medal when the finals relay, on which Nicolò Martinenghi swam the breaststroke, finished second in 1:36.39.

==== 2022 Mediterranean Games ====
2022 Mediterranean Games
Gold medal – first place	4×100 m medley	3:35.77
Bronze medal – third place	100 m breaststroke	1:00.31

For the preliminaries of the 50 metre breaststroke at the 2022 Mediterranean Games in Oran, Algeria, on day two of swimming competition, Pinzuti qualified for the final along with fellow Italian Fabio Scozzoli. In the final, later the same day, he placed fourth with a time of 27.55 seconds, finishing 0.09 seconds behind bronze medalist Peter John Stevens of Slovenia. Two days later, as part of the finals relay in the 4×100 metre medley relay, which consisted of him, Lorenzo Mora (backstroke), Matteo Rivolta (butterfly), and Alessandro Bori (freestyle), he won a gold medal, splitting a time of 1:00.44 for the breaststroke leg of the relay to help finish in 3:35.77. The final morning, he swam a 1:01.50 in the preliminaries of the 100 metre breaststroke and qualified for the final ranking second. In the evening, he won the bronze medal with a time of 1:00.31.

=== 2023 ===
At the 2023 Camille Muffat Meeting in Nice, France, Pinzuti was the highest-ranking Italian in the final of the men's 100 metre breaststroke on 15 March, placing seventh with a time of 1:02.70, which was 2.82 seconds behind gold medalist Arno Kamminga of the Netherlands. The following month, he placed sixth in the 100 metre breaststroke at the 2023 Italian National Championships on day two with a time of 1:00.97. On day three, he won a bronze medal with CS Esercito teammates, Lorenzo Glessi (backstroke), Federico Burdisso (butterfly), and Lorenzo Zazzeri (freestyle), in the 4×100 metre medley relay in a time of 3:37.36, swimming the breaststroke portion of the relay in 1:00.86. For his final event of the Championships, the 50 metre breaststroke on day five of five, he placed fourth with a time of 27.46 seconds.

== International championships ==
Meet	50 breaststroke	100 breaststroke	50 butterfly	4×100 medley relay	4×50 mixed medley relay
EJC 2017	2nd place, silver medalist(s)	3rd place, bronze medalist(s)	21st		—N/a
WJC 2017	2nd place, silver medalist(s)	5th		(bronze) ^{[a]}	—N/a
EC 2018	9th	12th		9th	—N/a
WUG 2019	9th	14th			—N/a
EC 2020	8th	7th		(bronze) ^{[a]}	—N/a
ESC 2021	6th (h)	9th (h)		—N/a	(silver) ^{[a]}
MG 2022	4th	3rd place, bronze medalist(s)		1st place, gold medalist(s)	—N/a

^{a} Pinzuti swam only in the prelims heats.

== Personal best times ==
=== Long course meters (50 m pool) ===
Event	Time		Meet	Location	Date	Ref
50 m breaststroke	27.11	sf	2020 European Aquatics Championships	Budapest, Hungary	21 May 2021	
100 m breaststroke	59.20	sf	2020 European Aquatics Championships	Budapest, Hungary	17 May 2021	
50 m butterfly	24.99	h	2017 European Junior Championships	Netanya, Israel	28 June 2017	

Legend: h – prelims heat; sf – semifinal

=== Short course meters (25 m pool) ===
Event	Time	Meet	Location	Date	Ref
50 m breaststroke	26.07	2021 International Swimming League	Naples	25 September 2021	
100 m breaststroke	57.03	2021 International Swimming League	Naples	19 September 2021	
