= Evgenii Somov =

Russian swimmer

Personal information
- Born: 28 January 1999 (age 27) Saint Petersburg, Russia
- Height: 1.95 m (6 ft 5 in)

Sport
- Sport: Swimming
Medal record
Men's swimming
Representing Russia
World Junior Championships
Gold medal – first place	2017 Indianapolis	4×100 m medley relay
Bronze medal – third place	2017 Indianapolis	4×100 m mixed medley relay
European Junior Championships
Gold medal – first place	2017 Netanya	200 m breaststroke
Silver medal – second place	2017 Netanya	100 m breaststroke
Silver medal – second place	2017 Netanya	4×100 m medley relay
Silver medal – second place	2017 Netanya	4×100 m mixed medley relay
Bronze medal – third place	2017 Netanya	50 m breaststroke
European Youth Olympic Festival
Gold medal – first place	2015 Tbilisi	4×100m freestyle relay
Bronze medal – third place	2015 Tbilisi	200 m individual medley

Evgenii Somov (Russian: Евгений Сомов, born 28 January 1999) is a Russian swimmer.

== Career ==
He was the only Russian swimmer to gain neutral status for the 2024 Summer Olympics, at which he competed in the men's 50 metre freestyle and men's 100 metre breaststroke events.

He is also a swimming coach for the swim team Albany Armada Aquatics in Albany, California.
