= Fabian Schwingenschlögl =

German swimmer

Personal information
- National team: Germany
- Born: 15 August 1991 (age 34) Erlangen, Bavaria, Germany

Sport
- Sport: Swimming
- Strokes: Breaststroke
- Club: Neckarsulmer SU
- College team: University of Missouri (2015–2017); Western Kentucky University (2013–2015)
Medal record
Men's swimming
Representing Germany
European Championships (LC)
Bronze medal – third place	2018 Glasgow	4×100 m medley
Summer Universiade (LC)
Bronze medal – third place	2017 Taipei	50 m breaststroke
Representing the Missouri Tigers
Event	1st	2nd	3rd
NCAA Championships	1	1	2
Total	1	1	2
By race
Event	1st	2nd	3rd
100 y breaststroke	1	1	0
200 y breaststroke	0	0	1
4×100 y medley	0	0	1
Total	1	1	2
NCAA Championships
Gold medal – first place	2016 Atlanta	100 y breaststroke
Silver medal – second place	2017 Indianapolis	100 y breaststroke
Bronze medal – third place	2016 Atlanta	200 y breaststroke
Bronze medal – third place	2017 Indianapolis	4×100 y medley

Fabian Schwingenschlögl (born 15 August 1991) is a German swimmer who specializes in breaststroke.

He competed in the 4 × 100 m medley relay event at the 2018 European Aquatics Championships, winning the bronze medal. He also represented Germany at the 2019 World Championships.

He won a 2016 NCAA title representing the University of Missouri in the 100-yard breaststroke. He was a multi-time All-American and swam the breaststroke leg on Missouri's All-American medley relays.

He qualified to represent Germany at the 2020 Summer Olympics. In his Olympic debut, he qualified for semifinals in the 100-meter breaststroke, finishing in the top-10 but failing to advance to finals.
