= Marius Kusch =

German swimmer (born 1993)

Personal information
- Nationality: German
- Born: 5 May 1993 (age 33)
- Height: 1.91 m (6 ft 3 in)
- Weight: 88 kg (194 lb)

Sport
- Sport: Swimming
- Strokes: Butterfly
- College team: Queens University of Charlotte
Medal record
World Championships (SC)
Bronze medal – third place	2022 Melbourne	100 m butterfly
European Championships (LC)
Bronze medal – third place	2018 Glasgow	4×100 m medley
European Championships (SC)
Gold medal – first place	2019 Glasgow	100 m butterfly
Bronze medal – third place	2017 Copenhagen	100 m butterfly

Marius Kusch (born 5 May 1993) is a German swimmer. He competed in the men's 100 metre butterfly event at the 2017 World Aquatics Championships. He qualified to represent Germany at the 2020 Summer Olympics. Kusch intends to participate in the 2026 Enhanced Games.
