= Egor Kuimov =

Russian swimmer

Personal information
- Full name: Egor Vladimirovich Kuimov
- Nationality: Russian
- Born: 4 July 1999 (age 26) Kazan, Russia

Sport
- Sport: Swimming
- Strokes: Butterfly
Medal record
European Championships (LC)
| Silver medal – second place | 2018 Glasgow | 4×100 m medley |
Summer Universiade
| Gold medal – first place | 2019 Naples | 100 m butterfly |
| Silver medal – second place | 2019 Naples | 4×100 m medley |

Egor Vladimirovich Kuimov (Russian: Егор Владимирович Куимов; born 4 July 1999) is a Russian swimmer.

He competed in the 4×100 m medley relay event at the 2018 European Aquatics Championships, winning the silver medal.
