= List of Polish records in swimming =

The Polish records in swimming are the fastest ever performances of swimmers from Poland, which are recognised and ratified by Polski Związek Pływacki (Polish Swimming Association, PZP).

All records were set in finals unless noted otherwise.

== Long Course (50 m) ==
=== Men ===
Event	Time		Name	Club	Date	Meet	Location	Ref
50 m freestyle	21.45	h	Paweł Juraszek	MKS Dziewiatka Dzierżoniów	24 May 2018	Polish Championships	Łódź, Poland	
100 m freestyle	48.22	sf	Konrad Czerniak	KS Wisła Puławy	29 July 2009	World Championships	Rome, Italy	
200 m freestyle	1:45.00	sf	Kamil Sieradzki	Poland	28 July 2025	World Championships	Singapore, Singapore	
400 m freestyle	3:45.71		Przemysław Stańczyk	Poland	21 August 2007	Japan International Meet	Chiba, Japan	
800 m freestyle	7:41.73		Wojciech Wojdak	Poland	26 July 2017	World Championships	Budapest, Hungary	
1500 m freestyle	14:45.94		Mateusz Sawrymowicz	Poland	1 April 2007	World Championships	Melbourne, Australia	
50m backstroke	24.41	sf	Ksawery Masiuk	Poland	2 August 2025	World Championships	Singapore, Singapore	
100m backstroke	52.55		Ksawery Masiuk	KU AZS UW	29 April 2025	Polish Championships	Lublin, Poland	
200m backstroke	1:54.24		Radosław Kawęcki	KS Korner Zielona Góra	2 August 2013	World Championships	Barcelona, Spain	
50m breaststroke	26.82	h	Jan Kozakiewicz	Poland	21 May 2021	European Championships	Budapest, Hungary	
100m breaststroke	59.58		Jan Kalusowski	Poland	18 June 2024	European Championships	Belgrade, Serbia	
200m breaststroke	2:09.99		Dawid Wiekiera	MKP Wodnik 29 Tychy	9 April 2022	Arena Grand Prix	Lublin, Poland	
50m butterfly	23.07	sf	Konrad Czerniak	Poland	2 August 2015	World Championships	Kazan, Russia	
100m butterfly	50.92		Jakub Majerski	Poland	31 July 2021	Olympic Games	Tokyo, Japan	
200m butterfly	1:52.64		Krzysztof Chmielewski	Poland	30 July 2025	World Championships	Singapore, Singapore	
200m individual medley	1:58.14		Marcin Cieślak	Poland	6 August 2015	World Championships	Kazan, Russia	
400m individual medley	4:12.28		Mateusz Matczak	Poland	11 July 2009	Universiade	Belgrade, Serbia	
4×100m freestyle relay	3:13.25		Mateusz Chowaniec (48.45); Dominik Dudys (48.60); Ksawery Masiuk (48.04); Kamil Sieradzki (48.16)	Poland	20 June 2024	European Championships	Belgrade, Serbia	
4×200m freestyle relay	7:08.31		Jan Świtkowski (1:47.43); Paweł Korzeniowski (1:47.46); Kacper Klich (1:47.82); Kacper Majchrzak (1:45.60)	Poland	21 May 2016	European Championships	London, Great Britain	
4×100m medley relay	3:32.62	h	Kacper Stokowski (54.67); Jan Kozakiewicz (59.24); Jakub Majerski (50.66); Jakub Kraska (48.05)	Poland	30 July 2021	Olympic Games	Tokyo, Japan	

Legend: # – Record awaiting ratification by Polski Związek Pływacki; WR – World record; ER – European record; e – equalled existing record;
Records not set in finals: h – heat; sf – semifinal; r – relay 1st leg; rh – relay heat 1st leg; b – B final; † – en route to final mark; so – swim-off; tt – time trial

=== Women ===
Event	Time		Name	Club	Date	Meet	Location	Ref
50m freestyle	23.84		Katarzyna Wasick	Poland	15 August 2026	European Championships	Paris, France	
100m freestyle	54.01	sf	Kornelia Fiedkiewicz	Poland	15 February 2024	World Championships	Doha, Qatar	
200m freestyle	1:57.15	r	Otylia Jędrzejczak	Poland	3 August 2006	European Championships	Budapest, Hungary	
400m freestyle	4:04.23		Otylia Jędrzejczak	Poland	25 March 2007	World Championships	Melbourne, Australia	
800m freestyle	8:33.93		Klaudia Tarasiewicz	Poland	26 June 2025	European U23 Championships	Šamorín, Slovakia	
1500m freestyle	16:26.58		Klaudia Tarasiewicz	Poland	28 June 2025	European U23 Championships	Šamorín, Slovakia	
50m backstroke	27.72	sf	Alicja Tchórz	Poland	4 August 2018	European Championships	Glasgow, Great Britain	
100m backstroke	59.75		Paulina Peda	AZS AWF Katowice	3 May 2022	Polish Open	Łódź, Poland	
200m backstroke	2:08.96	sf	Laura Bernat	Poland	28 July 2023	World Championships	Fukuoka, Japan	
50m breaststroke	30.22	h	Barbara Mazurkiewicz	Poland	2 August 2025	World Championships	Singapore, Singapore	
100m breaststroke	1:06.42	h	Dominika Sztandera	Poland	24 July 2023	World Championships	Fukuoka, Japan	
200m breaststroke	2:26.84		Wiktoria Bieńkowska	Poland	10 July 2009	European Junior Championships	Prague, Czech Republic	
50m butterfly	25.91	sf	Anna Dowgiert	Poland	7 August 2015	World Championships	Kazan, Russia	
100m butterfly	57.84	h	Otylia Jędrzejczak	Poland	14 August 2004	Olympic Games	Athens, Greece	
200m butterfly	2:05.61		Otylia Jędrzejczak	Poland	28 July 2005	World Championships	Montreal, Canada	
200m individual medley	2:12.13	sf	Katarzyna Baranowska	Poland	12 August 2008	Olympic Games	Beijing, China	
200m individual medley	2:10.55		Justina Kozan	Poland	15 August 2026	European Championships	Paris, France	
400m individual medley	4:36.47		Justina Kozan	Poland	12 August 2026	European Championships	Paris, France	
4×100m freestyle relay	3:38.65		Katarzyna Wasick (54.12); Kornelia Fiedkiewicz (54.23); Zuzanna Famulok (55.04); Julia Maik (55.26)	Poland	11 February 2024	World Championships	Doha, Qatar	
4×200m freestyle relay	7:56.32		Otylia Jędrzejczak (1:57.15); Joanna Budzis (2:01.03); Agata Zwiejska (2:00.11); Paulina Barzycka (1:58.03)	Poland	3 August 2006	European Championships	Budapest, Hungary	
4×100m medley relay	3:58.71		Adela Piskorska (1:00.40); Dominika Sztandera (1:06.07); Paulina Peda (58.15); Kornelia Fiedkiewicz (54.09)	Poland	23 June 2024	European Championships	Belgrade, Serbia	

Legend: # – Record awaiting ratification by Polski Związek Pływacki; WR – World record; ER – European record; e – equalled existing record;
Records not set in finals: h – heat; sf – semifinal; r – relay 1st leg; rh – relay heat 1st leg; b – B final; † – en route to final mark; so – swim-off; tt – time trial

=== Mixed relay ===
Event	Time		Name	Club	Date	Meet	Location	Ref
4×100 m freestyle relay	3:25.59		Jakub Kraska (49.19); Kacper Majchrzak (48.41); Alicja Tchórz (54.42); Katarzyna Wasick (53.57)	Poland	22 May 2021	European Championships	Budapest, Hungary	
4×200 m freestyle relay	7:35.08		Bartosz Piszczorowicz (1:48.93); Kamil Sieradzki (1:46.97); Wiktoria Gusc (1:59.05); Zuzanna Famulok (2:00.13)	Poland	22 June 2024	European Championships	Belgrade, Serbia	
4×100 m medley relay	3:44.22	h	Ksawery Masiuk (53.31); Dominika Sztandera (1:06.20); Jakub Majerski (50.99); Katarzyna Wasick (53.72)	Poland	30 July 2025	World Championships	Singapore, Singapore	

Legend: # – Record awaiting ratification by Polski Związek Pływacki; WR – World record; ER – European record; e – equalled existing record;
Records not set in finals: h – heat; so – swim-off

== Short Course (25 m) ==
=== Men ===
Event	Time		Name	Club	Date	Meet	Location	Ref
50 m freestyle	20.79		Konrad Czerniak	AZS AWF Katowice	17 December 2015	Polish Championships	Lublin, Poland	
100 m freestyle	46.19		Kacper Majchrzak	Poland	6 August 2017	World Cup	Berlin, Germany	
200 m freestyle	1:41.48		Kamil Sieradzki	Poland	4 December 2025	European Championships	Lublin, Poland	
400 m freestyle	3:37.57		Wojciech Wojdak	Poland	2 December 2015	European Championships	Netanya, Israel	
800 m freestyle	7:33.60		Wojciech Wojdak	Unia Oświęcim	19 December 2015	Polish Championships	Lublin, Poland	
1500 m freestyle	14:24.54		Mateusz Sawrymowicz	Poland	15 December 2007	European Championships	Debrecen, Hungary	
50m backstroke	22.68		Kacper Stokowski	Poland	13 December 2024	World Championships	Budapest, Hungary	
100m backstroke	49.10	r	Kacper Stokowski	Poland	15 December 2024	World Championships	Budapest, Hungary	
200m backstroke	1:47.38		Radosław Kawęcki	Poland	7 December 2014	World Championships	Doha, Qatar	
50m breaststroke	26.02		Jan Kalusowski	MKS TROJKA Lodz	6 November 2026	Memoriał Marka Petrusewicza	Wrocław, Poland	
100m breaststroke	56.76		Jan Kalusowski	MKS TROJKA Lodz	7 November 2026	Memoriał Marka Petrusewicza	Wrocław, Poland	
200m breaststroke	2:04.23		Jan Kalusowski	MKS TRÓJKA Łódź	21 December 2024	Polish Championships	Bydgoszcz, Poland	
50m butterfly	22.08		Marcin Cieślak	KU AZS UMCS Lublin	18 December 2020	Polish Championships	Olsztyn, Poland	
100m butterfly	49.18		Marcin Cieślak	Cali Condors	21 November 2020	International Swimming League	Budapest, Hungary	
200m butterfly	1:49.26		Krzysztof Chmielewski	Poland	12 December 2024	World Championships	Budapest, Hungary	
100m individual medley	51.14		Marcin Cieślak	Cali Condors	16 November 2020	International Swimming League	Budapest, Hungary	
200m individual medley	1:53.39		Jan Świtkowski	AZS UMCS Lublin	22 December 2018	Polish Championships	Lublin, Poland	
400m individual medley	4:03.20		Łukasz Wójt	Poland	14 November 2009	World Cup	Berlin, Germany	
4×50m freestyle relay	1:23.63		Piotr Ludwiczak (21.30); Ksawery Masiuk (20.62); Kamil Sieradzki (20.71); Mateusz Chowaniec (21.00)	Poland	2 December 2025	European Championships	Lublin, Poland	
4×100m freestyle relay	3:04.46		Kamil Sieradzki (46.33); Jakub Majerski (46.04); Ksawery Masiuk (45.64); Kacper Stokowski (46.45)	Poland	10 December 2024	World Championships	Budapest, Hungary	
4×200m freestyle relay	7:04.62		Paweł Korzeniowski; Paweł Rurak; Łukasz Gimiński; Łukasz Gąsior	AZS AWF Warszawa	29 November 2009	Polish Championships	Gorzów Wielkopolski, Poland	
4×50m medley relay (national)	1:32.30		Kacper Stokowski (23.17); Krzysztof Tokarski (26.17); Michał Chudy (22.61); Konrad Czerniak (20.35)	Poland	17 December 2017	European Championships	Copenhagen, Denmark	
4×50m medley relay (club)	1:33.90		Tomasz Polewka (23.52); Krzysztof Tokarski (26.95); Konrad Czerniak (22.14); Maciej Falacinski (21.29)	AZS AWF Katowice	17 December 2015	Polish Championships	Lublin, Poland	
4×100m medley relay	3:21.02		Kacper Stokowski (49.10); Jan Kalusowski (56.91); Jakub Majerski (49.16); Ksawery Masiuk (45.85)	Poland	15 December 2024	World Championships	Budapest, Hungary	

Legend: # – Record awaiting ratification by Polski Związek Pływacki; WR – World record; ER – European record; e – equalled existing record;
Records not set in finals: h – heat; sf – semifinal; r – relay 1st leg; rh – relay heat 1st leg; b – B final; † – en route to final mark; so – swim-off; tt – time trial

=== Women ===
Event	Time		Name	Club	Date	Meet	Location	Ref
50m freestyle	23.10		Katarzyna Wasick	Poland	3 November 2022	World Cup	Indianapolis, United States	
100m freestyle	51.44		Katarzyna Wasick	Toronto Titans	17 September 2021	International Swimming League	Naples, Italy	
200m freestyle	1:54.26		Justina Kozan	Poland	4 December 2025	European Championships	Lublin, Poland	
400m freestyle	4:02.68		Aleksandra Polańska	UKS GOS Raszyn	18 December 2020	Polish Championships	Olsztyn, Poland	
800m freestyle	8:18.62		Paulina Piechota	UKS 190 Łódź	16 December 2020	Polish Championships	Olsztyn, Poland	
1500m freestyle	15:52.72		Paulina Piechota	UKS 190 Łódź	20 December 2020	Polish Championships	Olsztyn, Poland	
50m backstroke	26.03		Aleksandra Urbańczyk	AZS UŁ-PŁ Łódź	19 December 2015	Polish Championships	Lublin, Poland	
100m backstroke	57.09		Alicja Tchórz	New York Breakers	27 October 2020	International Swimming League	Budapest, Hungary	
200m backstroke	2:04.43		Adela Piskorska	KU AZS UMCS Lublin	23 November 2024	Polish Grand Prix	Łódź, Poland	
50m breaststroke	29.22	sf	Dominika Sztandera	Poland	14 December 2024	World Championships	Budapest, Hungary	
100m breaststroke	1:03.97		Dominika Sztandera	Poland	3 December 2025	European Championships	Lublin, Poland	
200m breaststroke	2:21.37		Kinga Paradowska	Stowarzyszenie AZS WSG	27 October 2024	Polish Grand Prix	Lublin, Poland	
50m butterfly	25.36		Aleksandra Urbańczyk	AZS UŁ-PŁ Łódź	6 August 2017	World Cup	Berlin, Germany	
100m butterfly	57.00		Alicja Tchórz	New York Breakers	29 September 2021	International Swimming League	Naples, Italy	
200m butterfly	2:03.53		Otylia Jędrzejczak	Poland	13 December 2007	European Championships	Debrecen, Hungary	
100m individual medley	57.82		Alicja Tchórz	Poland	4 November 2021	European Championships	Kazan, Russia	
200m individual medley	2:07.97		Alicja Tchórz	Juvenia Wrocław	17 December 2015	Polish Championships	Lublin, Poland	
400m individual medley	4:28.56		Justina Kozan	Poland	7 December 2025	European Championships	Lublin, Poland	
4×50m freestyle relay (national)	1:35.75		Katarzyna Wasick (23.57); Kornelia Fiedkiewicz (23.70); Julia Maik (24.04); Barbara Lesniewska (24.44)	Poland	2 December 2025	European Championships	Lublin, Poland	
4×100m freestyle relay (club)	3:35.54		Alicja Tchórz (54.37); Kornelia Fiedkiewicz (52.48); Karolina Jurczyk (54.85); Klaudia Naziębło (53.84)	Juvenia Wrocław	17 December 2020	Polish Championships	Olsztyn, Poland	
4×200m freestyle relay (club)	8:01.75		Klaudia Naziębło (1:59.96); Kornelia Fiedkiewicz (1:59.12); Dominika Sztandera (2:04.06); Alicja Tchórz (1:58.59)	Juvenia Wrocław	19 December 2020	Polish Championships	Olsztyn, Poland	
4×50m medley relay (national)	1:44.55		Adela Piskorska (27.36); Dominika Sztandera (29.18); Kornelia Fiedkiewicz (25.04); Katarzyna Wasick (22.97)	Poland	7 December 2025	European Championships	Lublin, Poland	
4×50m medley relay (club)	1:45.16		Alicja Tchórz (26.41); Dominika Sztandera (29.29); Klaudia Naziębło (25.83); Kornelia Fiedkiewicz (23.63)	Juvenia Wrocław	16 December 2020	Polish Championships	Olsztyn, Poland	
4×100m medley relay (club)	3:53.04		Alicja Tchórz (58.15); Dominika Sztandera (1:04.45); Klaudia Naziębło (58.16); Kornelia Fiedkiewicz (52.28)	Juvenia Wrocław	20 December 2020	Polish Championships	Olsztyn, Poland	

Legend: # – Record awaiting ratification by Polski Związek Pływacki; WR – World record; ER – European record; e – equalled existing record;
Records not set in finals: h – heat; sf – semifinal; r – relay 1st leg; rh – relay heat 1st leg; b – B final; † – en route to final mark; so – swim-off; tt – time trial

=== Mixed relay ===
Event	Time		Name	Club	Date	Meet	Location	Ref
4×50m freestyle relay	1:28.55		Piotr Ludwiczak (21.34); Kamil Sieradzki (20.72); Katarzyna Wasick (22.95); Kornelia Fiedkiewicz (23.54)	Poland	4 December 2025	European Championships	Lublin, Poland	
4×50m medley relay	1:36.98		Aleksander Stys (23.13); Jan Kalusowski (25.71); Kornelia Fiedkiewicz (25.32); Katarzyna Wasick (22.82)	Poland	3 December 2025	European Championships	Lublin, Poland	
4×100m medley relay	3:37.76	h	Kacper Stokowski (49.78); Dominika Sztandera (1:04.38); Jakub Majerski (50.08); Kornelia Fiedkiewicz (53.52)	Poland	14 December 2024	World Championships	Budapest, Hungary	

Legend: # – Record awaiting ratification by Polski Związek Pływacki; WR – World record; ER – European record; e – equalled existing record;
Records not set in finals: h – heat; so – swim-off
