= Yaroslav Potapov =

Russian swimmer

Personal information
- Nationality: Russian
- Born: 1 July 1999 (age 27)

Sport
- Sport: Swimming

Yaroslav Potapov (born 1 July 1999) is a Russian swimmer. He competed in the men's 1500 metre freestyle event at the 2016 Summer Olympics.
