= Matteo Restivo =

Italian swimmer (born 1994)

Personal information
- Nationality: Italian
- Born: 4 November 1994 (age 31) Udine, Italy

Sport
- Sport: Swimming
- Strokes: Backstroke
Medal record
Men's swimming
Representing Italy
European Championships (LC)
Bronze medal – third place	2018 Glasgow	200 m backstroke
Bronze medal – third place	2018 Glasgow	4×100 m mixed medley
Mediterranean Games
Gold medal – first place	2022 Oran	4×100 m medley
Silver medal – second place	2022 Oran	200 m backstroke

Matteo Restivo (born 4 November 1994) is an Italian swimmer. He competed at the 2020 Summer Olympics, in 200 m backstroke.

He competed in the men's 200 metre backstroke event at the 2017 World Aquatics Championships.
