= Georgios Spanoudakis =

Greek footballer (born 1998)

Personal information
- Date of birth: November 25, 1998 (age 27)
- Place of birth: Giannitsa, Greece
- Position: Midfielder

Team information
- Current team: Tilikratis FC

Youth career
- 2009–2014: Barcelona

Senior career*
Years	Team	Apps	(Gls)
2017–2018	VfB Stuttgart II	2	(0)
2018–2019	Vitória SC B		
2019–2020	SV Sandhausen II	10	(2)
2020–2022	SV Wacker Burghausen	18	(0)
2022–2023	1. FC Schweinfurt 05	19	(0)
2023–	Tilikratis FC	13	(0)
- * Club domestic league appearances and goals

Georgios Spanoudakis (Greek: Γιώργος Σπανουδάκης; born 25 November 1998) is a Greek footballer who plays as a midfielder for Tilikratis FC.

== Early life ==
Spanoudakis started playing football at the age of five.

== Career ==
As a youth player, Spanoudakis joined the youth academy of German side VfB Stuttgart, helping the club achieve second place.

== Style of play ==
Spanoudakis was described as "above-average robust in duels for his age, and his ability to capture, maintain and process the ball, even in the tightest of spaces, is outstanding. His good overview and ability to put the people in front of him in the limelight with outstanding passes".

== Personal life ==
Spanoudakis is the son of Konstantinos Spanoudakis.
