= Théo Bussière =

French swimmer (born 1995)

Personal information
- National team: France
- Born: 18 January 1995 (age 31) Arnas, Rhône, France
- Height: 1.88 m (6 ft 2 in)
- Weight: 89 kg (196 lb)

Sport
- Sport: Swimming
Medal record
European Championships (SC)
Bronze medal – third place	2017 Copenhagen	4×50 m mixed medley

Théo Bussière (born 18 January 1995) is a French competitive breaststroke swimmer. He competed for France in the 2016 Summer Olympics in the heats on the 4x100 meter relay.

He was French champion in the 50-meter breaststroke and 100-meter breaststroke in 2017, 2018 and 2019.

He will compete in the 100-meter breaststroke at the Tokyo Olympics in 2021.
