= Jan Kozakiewicz =

Polish swimmer

Personal information
- Nationality: Polish
- Born: 24 February 1996 (age 30)

Sport
- Sport: Swimming

Jan Kozakiewicz (born 24 February 1996) is a Polish swimmer and national record holder in 50 metre breaststroke. He finished in fourth place in the men's 50 metre breaststroke event at the 2020 European Aquatics Championships, in Budapest, Hungary.
