= Konstantinos Meretsolias =

Greek swimmer

Personal information
- Born: 23 August 1998 (age 26); Athens, Greece
- Height: 182 cm (6 ft 0 in) / 81 kg

Sport
- Country: Greece
- Sport: Swimming

Konstantinos Meretsolias (Greek: Κωνσταντίνος Μερετσολιάς, born 23 August 1998) is a Greek swimmer. He competed in the 2020 Summer Olympics.
