= Kacper Stokowski =

Polish swimmer (born 1999)

Personal information
- National team: Poland
- Born: January 6, 1999 (age 27) Warsaw, Poland
- Height: 1.86 m (6 ft 1 in)
- Weight: 73 kg (161 lb)

Sport
- Sport: Swimming
- Strokes: Freestyle, backstroke
- College team: University of Florida; NC State
- Coach: Anthony Nesty (Florida); Braden Holloway (UNC)
Medal record
Men's swimming
Representing Poland
World Championships (SC)
Bronze medal – third place	2022 Melbourne	50 m backstroke
Bronze medal – third place	2024 Budapest	100 m backstroke
Bronze medal – third place	2024 Budapest	4×100 m freestyle
World Junior Championships
Silver medal – second place	2017 Indianapolis	4×100 m freestyle
Bronze medal – third place	2017 Indianapolis	50 m backstroke
European Junior Championships
Gold medal – first place	2016 Hódmezővásárhely	200 m freestyle
Gold medal – first place	2016 Hódmezővásárhely	4×200 m freestyle
Gold medal – first place	2017 Netanya	100 m backstroke
Gold medal – first place	2017 Netanya	4×100 m freestyle
Bronze medal – third place	2016 Hódmezővásárhely	4×100 m freestyle
World University Games
Silver medal – second place	2021 Chengdu	4×100 mixed medley

Kacper Aleksander Stokowski (born 6 January 1999) is a Polish competitive swimmer, who competed for the University of Florida and North Carolina State University and represented his native Poland in both the 2020 Summer Olympics in Tokyo and the 2024 Summer Olympics in Paris.

== Early life ==
Stokowski was born in Warsaw, Poland on 6 January 1999, and attended High School No. LIX Mistrzotwa Sportowego.

As a prep school swimmer, he was a silver medalist in the 4 × 100 m freestyle relay, and the 50 backstroke at the World Junior Championships. He set a World Junior Championship record in both the 100 and 50 backstroke. He was a European Junior Champion in four instances, including the 200 freestyle, 100 backstroke, 4x200 relay and 4x100 freestyle relay. Stating his prep school record in greater detail, at the 2017 FINA World Jr. Championships he captured a bronze medal with a time of 25.38 in the 50-meter backstroke and captured a fifth place in the 100 meter backstroke, recording a time of 55.04. At the 2016 European Jr. Swimming Championships, he captured a gold medal in the 200-meter freestyle with a time of 1:48.51.

== Collegiate swimming ==
Stokowski attended Florida State University for the 2018–19 school year where he swam under Head Coach Anthony Nesty, a former Olympic champion, and was rated as the top 2018 recruit and the top recruit from Poland. He then transferred to North Carolina State, where he completed most of his collegiate career.

After transferring Stokowski attended North Carolina State University and swam under Head Coach Braden Holloway where he had an exceptional collegiate swimming career. In 2022, Stokowski was an NCAA Champion in the 100 backstroke, and the following year won an NCAA Championship in the 200 medley relay. Between 2021 and 2024, he was an All-American twenty times, winning events primarily in the 100 backstroke, 200 backstroke, 200, 400, and 800 Medley Relay, as well as the 100 butterfly. Stokowski was an Atlantic Coast Conference champion nine times in the 100 backstroke and 400 medley relay, also winning a title in the 200 medley relay in 2023.

At NC State, Stokowski roomed with fellow Polish swimmer and NC State teammate Bartosz Piszczorowicz, who also qualified for the Polish Olympic team.

== International competition ==
He won a gold medal in the 4×200-metre freestyle relay at the 2016 European Junior Swimming Championships. He was the former junior world record holder in the 50- and 100 metre backstroke (short course).

== Olympics ==
Stokowski qualified for both the 2020 Summer Olympics in Tokyo and the 2024 Summer Olympics in Paris as a participant for Poland.

=== 2020 Tokyo Olympics ===
In the 2020 Olympics, he placed 23rd in the 100-meter backstroke with a time of 53.99 placing first in the second preliminary heat, though he did not make the finals, and his time was around 1.7 seconds from contending for a bronze medal. Russian swimmers, known as the Russian Olympic Committee team, placed both first and second in the competition with American Ryan Murphy taking the bronze medal.

His team placed ninth in the 4x100 meter medley with a combined time of 3:32.62, with Kacper swimming the leadoff leg with the Polish team of Jan Kozakiewicz, Jakub Majerski, and Jakub Kraska. The United States took the gold medal, followed by Great Britain with the Silver, and Italy winning the bronze with a time of 3:29.17.

=== 2024 Paris Olympics ===
On February 8, 2024, he swam with the Polish 4x100 Medley relay team that finished 14th at the Paris Olympics with a time of 3:48.19.
