= Swimming at the 2020 European Aquatics Championships – Men's 200 metre backstroke =

Men's 200 metre backstroke at the 2020 European Aquatics Championships
- Venue: Danube Arena
- Dates: 21 May 2021 (heats and semifinals); 22 May 2021 (final)
- Competitors: 45 from 21 nations
- Winning time: 1:54.46

Medalists
gold medal	Evgeny Rylov	Russia
silver medal	Luke Greenbank	Great Britain
bronze medal	Roman Mityukov	Switzerland

The Men's 200 metre backstroke competition of the 2020 European Aquatics Championships was held on 21 and 22 May 2021.

== Records ==
Prior the competition, the existing world, European, and championship records were as follows.

	Name	Nationality	Time	Location	Date
World record	Aaron Peirsol	United States	1:51.92	Rome	31 July 2009
European record	Evgeny Rylov	Russia	1:53.23	Kazan	8 April 2021
Championship record	Evgeny Rylov	Russia	1:53.36	Glasgow	8 August 2018

== Results ==
=== Heats ===
The heats were started on 21 May 2021 at 10:47.

Rank	Heat	Lane	Name	Nationality	Time	Notes
1	4	4	Luke Greenbank	Great Britain	1:54.67	Q, NR
2	5	4	Evgeny Rylov	Russia	1:55.74	Q
3	3	1	Antoine Herlem	France	1:56.42	Q
4	4	2	Jan Čejka	Czech Republic	1:56.66	Q, NR
5	4	5	Ádám Telegdy	Hungary	1:57.22	Q
6	3	2	Grigoriy Tarasevich	Russia	1:57.41	Q
7	3	4	Yohann Ndoye Brouard	France	1:57.70	Q
8	3	5	Radosław Kawęcki	Poland	1:57.79	Q
9	5	7	Jakub Skierka	Poland	1:58.15	Q
10	5	6	Lorenzo Mora	Italy	1:58.48	Q
11	3	0	João Costa	Portugal	1:58.58	Q
12	3	6	Roman Mityukov	Switzerland	1:58.64	Q
13	4	8	Benedek Kovács	Hungary	1:58.84	Q
14	5	9	Péter Bernek	Hungary	1:59.07	
15	5	2	Hugo González	Spain	1:59.10	Q, WD
15	5	8	Francisco Santos	Portugal	1:59.10	Q
17	5	1	Manuel Martos	Spain	1:59.23	Q
18	5	3	Matteo Restivo	Italy	1:59.45	QSO
18	5	5	Brodie Williams	Great Britain	1:59.45	QSO
20	4	7	Elliot Clogg	Great Britain	1:59.54	
21	3	3	Nicolás García	Spain	1:59.59	
22	2	1	Robert Glință	Romania	1:59.74	
23	4	1	Apostolos Christou	Greece	1:59.79	
24	4	6	Berke Saka	Turkey	2:00.18	
25	1	2	Maxim Stupin	Russia	2:00.20	
26	4	3	Kaloyan Levterov	Bulgaria	2:00.38	
27	3	7	Mewen Tomac	France	2:00.63	
28	3	9	Ksawery Masiuk	Poland	2:00.80	
29	4	9	James McFadzen	Great Britain	2:00.85	
30	2	3	Primož Šenica Pavletič	Slovenia	2:00.92	
31	2	4	David Gerchik	Israel	2:01.52	
31	2	2	Erikas Grigaitis	Lithuania	2:01.52	
33	2	8	Samuel Törnqvist	Sweden	2:02.05	
34	4	0	Ádám Jászó	Hungary	2:02.20	
35	2	5	Tomáš Ludvík	Czech Republic	2:02.52	
36	1	6	Gustav Hökfelt	Sweden	2:02.54	
37	2	6	Melikşah Düğen	Turkey	2:02.62	
38	5	0	Mikita Tsmyh	Belarus	2:02.74	
39	2	0	Armin Evert Lelle	Estonia	2:03.68	
40	2	9	Saša Boškan	Slovenia	2:03.69	
41	1	5	Ron Polonsky	Israel	2:04.10	
42	1	3	Max Mannes	Luxembourg	2:04.19	
43	1	4	Metin Aydın	Turkey	2:05.20	
44	1	7	Alexander Kudashev	Russia	2:06.51	
45	2	7	Adam Maraana	Israel	2:06.93	
	3	9	Evangelos Makrygiannis	Greece	Did not start	

==== Swim-off ====
The swim-off was held on 21 May at 12:15.

Rank	Lane	Name	Nationality	Time	Notes
1	4	Brodie Williams	Great Britain	1:59.24	Q
2	5	Matteo Restivo	Italy	1:59.27	

=== Semifinals ===
The semifinals were held on 21 May at 18:30.

==== Semifinal 1 ====
Rank	Lane	Name	Nationality	Time	Notes
1	4	Evgeny Rylov	Russia	1:55.11	Q
2	7	Roman Mityukov	Switzerland	1:56.37	Q
3	6	Radosław Kawęcki	Poland	1:57.10	q
4	5	Jan Čejka	Czech Republic	1:57.43	
5	3	Grigoriy Tarasevich	Russia	1:57.68	
6	1	Francisco Santos	Portugal	1:58.03	NR
7	2	Lorenzo Mora	Italy	1:58.13	
8	8	Brodie Williams	Great Britain	2:02.52	

==== Semifinal 2 ====
Rank	Lane	Name	Nationality	Time	Notes
1	4	Luke Greenbank	Great Britain	1:54.43	Q, NR
2	3	Ádám Telegdy	Hungary	1:56.17	Q
3	5	Antoine Herlem	France	1:56.63	q
4	6	Yohann Ndoye Brouard	France	1:57.06	q
5	2	Jakub Skierka	Poland	1:57.08	q
6	1	Benedek Kovács	Hungary	1:58.20	
7	7	João Costa	Portugal	1:58.72	
8	8	Manuel Martos	Spain	1:59.38	

=== Final ===
The final was held on 22 May at 19:17.

Rank	Lane	Name	Nationality	Time	Notes
1st place, gold medalist(s)	5	Evgeny Rylov	Russia	1:54.46	
2nd place, silver medalist(s)	4	Luke Greenbank	Great Britain	1:54.62	
3rd place, bronze medalist(s)	6	Roman Mityukov	Switzerland	1:56.33	
4	7	Yohann Ndoye-Brouard	France	1:56.37	
5	3	Ádám Telegdy	Hungary	1:56.67	
6	8	Radosław Kawęcki	Poland	1:57.05	
7	1	Jakub Skierka	Poland	1:58.56	
8	2	Antoine Herlem	France	1:58.64	
