= Swimming at the 2022 European Aquatics Championships – Men's 100 metre backstroke =

Men's 100 metre backstroke at the 2022 European Aquatics Championships
- Venue: Foro Italico
- Dates: 16 August (heats and semifinals); 17 August (final)
- Competitors: 43 from 22 nations
- Winning time: 52.21

Medalists
gold medal	Thomas Ceccon	Italy
silver medal	Apostolos Christou	Greece
bronze medal	Yohann Ndoye-Brouard	France

The Men's 100 metre backstroke competition of the 2022 European Aquatics Championships was held on 16 and 17 August 2022.

== Records ==
Prior to the competition, the existing world, European and championship records were as follows.

	Name	Nationality	Time	Location	Date
World record European record	Thomas Ceccon	Italy	51.60	Budapest	20 June 2022
Championship record	Camille Lacourt	France	52.11	Budapest	10 August 2010

== Results ==
=== Heats ===
The heats were started on 16 August at 09:30.

Rank	Heat	Lane	Name	Nationality	Time	Notes
1	5	4	Thomas Ceccon	Italy	53.71	Q
2	4	4	Apostolos Christou	Greece	53.78	Q
3	4	3	João Costa	Portugal	53.87	Q, NR
4	5	3	Roman Mityukov	Switzerland	54.01	Q
5	5	5	Ksawery Masiuk	Poland	54.04	Q
6	3	2	Michele Lamberti	Italy	54.37	Q
7	3	1	Lorenzo Mora	Italy	54.41	
8	3	8	Jonathon Adam	Great Britain	54.43	Q
9	4	6	Kacper Stokowski	Poland	54.44	Q
10	3	4	Yohann Ndoye-Brouard	France	54.49	Q
11	4	7	Tomas Franta	Czech Republic	54.52	Q
12	3	3	Ole Braunschweig	Germany	54.53	Q
13	4	1	Jonathon Marshall	Great Britain	54.57	Q
14	5	7	Benedek Kovács	Hungary	54.67	Q
15	5	1	Matteo Restivo	Italy	54.69	
16	4	5	Mewen Tomac	France	55.33	Q
17	2	5	Markus Lie	Norway	55.34	Q
18	5	6	Oleksandr Zheltyakov	Ukraine	55.49	WD
19	3	0	Nicolás García	Spain	55.57	Q
20	2	8	Theodoros Andreopoulos	Greece	55.63	
21	2	3	Kaloyan Levterov	Bulgaria	55.65	
21	5	8	Brodie Williams	Great Britain	55.65	
23	1	4	Andrei Anghel	Romania	55.67	
23	4	0	Antoine Herlem	France	55.67	
25	5	2	Evangelos Makrygiannis	Greece	55.77	
26	3	7	Francisco Santos	Portugal	55.81	
27	2	1	David Gerchik	Israel	55.87	
28	2	6	Diego Mira	Spain	55.94	
29	5	0	Sebastian Somerset	Great Britain	55.98	
30	2	4	Tomasz Polewka	Poland	56.13	
31	3	9	Erikas Grigaitis	Lithuania	56.17	
32	2	9	Nils Liess	Switzerland	56.24	
33	3	6	Jan Čejka	Czech Republic	56.38	
34	5	9	Inbar Danziger	Israel	56.40	
35	3	5	Michael Laitarovsky	Israel	56.70	
36	4	8	Adam Maraana	Israel	56.95	
37	2	0	Max Mannes	Luxembourg	57.21	
38	2	2	Paweł Franke	Poland	57.50	
39	4	9	Armin Evert Lelle	Estonia	57.54	
40	1	3	Dylan Cachia	Malta	1:00.08	
41	1	7	Martin Muja	Kosovo	1:00.90	
42	1	6	Ared Ruci	Albania	1:05.68	
43	1	2	Kevin Shkurti	Albania	1:07.16	
	1	5	Primož Šenica Pavletič	Slovenia	Did not start	
	2	7	Sašo Boškan	Slovenia	Did not start	
	4	2	Shane Ryan	Ireland	Did not start	

=== Semifinals ===
The semifinals were started on 16 August at 19:52.

Rank	Heat	Lane	Name	Nationality	Time	Notes
1	2	2	Yohann Ndoye-Brouard	France	52.97	Q
2	1	4	Apostolos Christou	Greece	53.20	Q
3	2	4	Thomas Ceccon	Italy	53.48	Q
4	2	3	Ksawery Masiuk	Poland	53.71	q
5	1	5	Roman Mityukov	Switzerland	53.75	Q, NR
6	1	1	Mewen Tomac	France	53.89	q
7	2	5	João Costa	Portugal	53.90	q
8	2	7	Ole Braunschweig	Germany	54.05	q
9	1	6	Kacper Stokowski	Poland	54.18	
10	1	2	Tomas Franta	Czech Republic	54.27	
11	1	7	Jonathon Marshall	Great Britain	54.43	
12	2	1	Benedek Kovács	Hungary	54.47	
13	1	3	Michele Lamberti	Italy	54.56	
14	2	6	Jonathon Adam	Great Britain	54.76	
15	2	8	Markus Lie	Norway	54.91	
16	1	8	Nicolás García	Spain	55.52	

=== Final ===
The final was held on 17 August at 18:10.

Rank	Lane	Name	Nationality	Time	Notes
1st place, gold medalist(s)	3	Thomas Ceccon	Italy	52.21	
2nd place, silver medalist(s)	5	Apostolos Christou	Greece	52.24	
3rd place, bronze medalist(s)	4	Yohann Ndoye-Brouard	France	52.92	
4	2	Roman Mityukov	Switzerland	53.55	NR
5	1	João Costa	Portugal	54.01	
6	6	Ksawery Masiuk	Poland	54.05	
7	8	Ole Braunschweig	Germany	54.25	
8	7	Mewen Tomac	France	54.79	
