= Swimming at the 2022 European Aquatics Championships – Men's 200 metre backstroke =

Men's 200 metre backstroke at the 2022 European Aquatics Championships
- Venue: Foro Italico
- Dates: 12 August (heats and semifinals); 13 August (final)
- Competitors: 30 from 16 nations
- Winning time: 1:55.62

Medalists
gold medal	Yohann Ndoye-Brouard	France
silver medal	Benedek Kovács	Hungary
bronze medal	Luke Greenbank	Great Britain

The Men's 200 metre backstroke competition of the 2022 European Aquatics Championships was held on 12 and 13 August 2022.

== Records ==
Prior to the competition, the existing world, European and championship records were as follows.

	Name	Nationality	Time	Location	Date
World record	Aaron Peirsol	United States	1:51.92	Rome	31 July 2009
European record	Evgeny Rylov	Russia	1:53.23	Kazan	8 April 2021
Championship record	Evgeny Rylov	Russia	1:53.36	Glasgow	8 August 2018

== Results ==
=== Heats ===
The heats were started on 12 August at 09:42.

Rank	Heat	Lane	Name	Nationality	Time	Notes
1	3	3	Yohann Ndoye-Brouard	France	1:56.70	Q
2	1	6	Benedek Kovács	Hungary	1:56.81	Q
3	1	5	Mewen Tomac	France	1:57.51	Q
4	3	4	Luke Greenbank	Great Britain	1:57.81	Q
5	2	2	Hubert Kós	Hungary	1:58.15	Q
6	2	3	Antoine Herlem	France	1:58.22	
7	1	2	João Costa	Portugal	1:58.68	Q
8	2	4	Ádám Telegdy	Hungary	1:58.88	
9	3	7	Apostolos Siskos	Greece	1:58.99	Q
10	1	7	David Gerchik	Israel	1:59.13	Q
11	3	2	Lorenzo Mora	Italy	1:59.18	Q
12	2	5	Nicolás García	Spain	1:59.46	Q
13	1	3	Matteo Restivo	Italy	1:59.62	Q
14	3	1	Primož Šenica Pavletič	Slovenia	1:59.76	Q
15	1	4	Brodie Williams	Great Britain	1:59.89	Q
16	3	5	Roman Mityukov	Switzerland	2:00.29	Q
17	3	6	Jan Čejka	Czech Republic	2:00.86	Q
18	2	6	Francisco Santos	Portugal	2:00.88	Q
19	1	8	Diego Mira	Spain	2:01.06	
20	2	7	Kaloyan Levterov	Bulgaria	2:01.16	
21	3	8	Vadym Naumenko	Ukraine	2:01.55	
22	2	8	Anže Ferš Eržen	Slovenia	2:01.99	
23	1	1	Erikas Grigaitis	Lithuania	2:02.06	
24	2	0	Jonathon Marshall	Great Britain	2:02.78	
25	3	0	Inbar Danziger	Israel	2:03.48	
26	2	1	Émilien Mattenet	France	2:03.52	
27	3	9	Zhulian Lavdaniti	Albania	2:08.30	
28	1	0	Adam Maraana	Israel	2:08.88	
29	1	9	Kevin Shkurti	Albania	2:24.87	
	6	0	Michał Chmielewski	Poland	Disqualified	

=== Semifinals ===
The semifinals were started on 12 August at 18:49.

Rank	Heat	Lane	Name	Nationality	Time	Notes
1	1	1	Roman Mityukov	Switzerland	1:56.22	Q, NR
2	2	4	Yohann Ndoye-Brouard	France	1:56.39	Q
3	1	5	Luke Greenbank	Great Britain	1:57.07	Q
4	2	2	Lorenzo Mora	Italy	1:57.62	Q
5	2	3	Hubert Kós	Hungary	1:57.68	q
6	1	4	Benedek Kovács	Hungary	1:57.83	q
7	2	7	Matteo Restivo	Italy	1:58.20	q
8	2	5	Mewen Tomac	France	1:58.24	q
9	2	6	Apostolos Siskos	Greece	1:58.66	
10	1	2	Nicolás García	Spain	1:58.68	
11	1	3	João Costa	Portugal	1:58.96	
12	1	7	Primož Šenica Pavletič	Slovenia	1:59.66	
13	2	1	Brodie Williams	Great Britain	1:59.69	
14	1	6	David Gerchik	Israel	2:00.26	
15	2	8	Jan Čejka	Czech Republic	2:00.29	
16	1	8	Francisco Santos	Portugal	2:00.73	

=== Final ===
The final was held on 13 August at 18:10.

Rank	Lane	Name	Nationality	Time	Notes
1st place, gold medalist(s)	5	Yohann Ndoye-Brouard	France	1:55.62	NR
2nd place, silver medalist(s)	7	Benedek Kovács	Hungary	1:56.03	
3rd place, bronze medalist(s)	3	Luke Greenbank	Great Britain	1:56.15	
4	4	Roman Mityukov	Switzerland	1:56.45	
5	1	Matteo Restivo	Italy	1:57.30	
6	6	Lorenzo Mora	Italy	1:57.43	
7	8	Mewen Tomac	France	1:57.71	
8	2	Hubert Kós	Hungary	1:57.84	
