= Swimming at the 2020 Summer Olympics – Men's 200 metre backstroke =

Men's 200 metre backstroke at the Games of the XXXII Olympiad
- Swimming pictogram
- Venue: Tokyo Aquatics Centre
- Dates: 28 July 2021 (heats); 29 July 2021 (semifinals); 30 July 2021 (final)
- Competitors: 29 from 23 nations
- Winning time: 1:53.27 OR

Medalists
1st place, gold medalist(s)		Evgeny Rylov	ROC
2nd place, silver medalist(s)		Ryan Murphy	United States
3rd place, bronze medalist(s)		Luke Greenbank	Great Britain

The men's 200 metre backstroke event at the 2020 Summer Olympics was held from 28 to 30 July 2021 at the Tokyo Aquatics Centre. There will be approximately 30 competitors from approximately 20 nations, with the ultimate numbers determined through the ongoing selection process, including universality places.

== Background ==
This was the 16th appearance of the 200 metre backstroke event. It was first held in 1900. The event did not return until 1964; since then, it has been on the programme at every Summer Games. From 1904 to 1960, a men's 100 metre backstroke was held instead. In 1964, only the 200 metres was held. Beginning in 1968 and ever since, both the 100 and 200 metre versions have been held.

Of the 2016 finalists, defending Olympic champion Ryan Murphy returned, along with bronze medalist Evgeny Rylov of Russia (competing under the ROC banner), fourth-place finisher Xu Jiayu of China, seventh-place finisher Christian Diener of Germany, and eighth-place finisher (and 2012 silver medalist) Ryosuke Irie of Japan. Rylov had won the 2017 and 2019 World Championships with Murphy finishing second both times.

== Summary ==
After his win in the shorter backstroke event days earlier, Russia's Evgeny Rylov set an Olympic record of 1:53.27 to take gold and complete the backstroke double. While he led wire-to-wire after the first lap, Rylov extended his margin over the field to collect his second individual gold. The U.S.' Ryan Murphy trailed Great Britain's Luke Greenbank at the 50 m mark, but moved through the field to collect silver in 1:54.15 – almost a second behind Rylov. Meanwhile, Greenbank could not maintain his margin over Murphy after the first turn, taking bronze in 1:54.72.

The U.S.' Bryce Mefford could not join his teammate Murphy on the podium, falling to fourth place to 1:55.49. Hungary's Ádám Telegdy touched in 1:56.15, edging out Poland's Radosław Kawęcki (1:56.39) by 0.24 seconds. Competing at his fourth Olympics, Japanese backstroke stalwart and 2012 silver medallist Ryosuke Irie (1:57.32) came seventh while Spain's Nicolás García (1:59.06) rounded out the field.

== Qualification ==
The Olympic Qualifying Time for the event was 1:57.50. Up to two swimmers per National Olympic Committee (NOC) could automatically qualify by swimming that time at an approved qualification event. The Olympic Selection Time was 2:01.03. Up to one swimmer per NOC meeting that time was eligible for selection, allocated by world ranking until the maximum quota for all swimming events was reached. NOCs without a male swimmer qualified in any event could also use their universality place.

== Competition format ==
The competition consisted of three rounds: heats, semifinals, and a final. The swimmers with the best 16 times in the heats advanced to the semifinals. The swimmers with the best 8 times in the semifinals advanced to the final. Swim-offs were used as necessary to break ties for advancement to the next round.

== Records ==
Prior to this competition, the existing world and Olympic records were as follows.

World record	Aaron Peirsol (USA)	1:51.92	Rome, Italy	31 July 2009
Olympic record	Tyler Clary (USA)	1:53.41	London, United Kingdom	2 August 2012

The following records was established during the competition:

Date	Event	Swimmer	Nation	Time	Record
July 30	Final	Evgeny Rylov	ROC	1:53.27	OR

== Schedule ==
All times are Japan Standard Time (UTC+9)

Date	Time	Round
28 July 2021	19:21	Heats
29 July 2021	11:04	Semifinals
30 July 2021	10:50	Final

== Results ==
=== Heats ===
The swimmers with the top 16 times, regardless of heat, advance to the semifinals.

Rank	Heat	Lane	Swimmer	Nation	Time	Notes
1	2	4	Luke Greenbank	Great Britain	1:54.63	Q
2	4	4	Evgeny Rylov	ROC	1:56.02	Q
3	4	5	Bryce Mefford	United States	1:56.37	Q
4	2	1	Lee Ju-ho	South Korea	1:56.77	Q, NR
5	1	4	Grigory Tarasevich	ROC	1:56.82	Q
6	2	6	Radosław Kawęcki	Poland	1:56.83	Q
7	3	4	Ryan Murphy	United States	1:56.92	Q
8	2	5	Ryosuke Irie	Japan	1:56.97	Q
9	4	3	Keita Sunama	Japan	1:57.07	Q
10	4	2	Tristan Hollard	Australia	1:57.24	Q
11	3	6	Roman Mityukov	Switzerland	1:57.45	Q
12	4	6	Brodie Williams	Great Britain	1:57.48	Q
13	4	8	Nicolás García	Spain	1:57.62	Q
14	2	3	Ádám Telegdy	Hungary	1:57.70	Q
15	3	5	Xu Jiayu	China	1:57.76	Q, WD
16	2	7	Markus Thormeyer	Canada	1:57.85	Q
17	3	3	Yohann Ndoye-Brouard	France	1:57.96	Q
18	4	7	Jan Čejka	Czech Republic	1:58.02	
19	4	1	Christian Diener	Germany	1:58.27	
20	3	2	Matteo Restivo	Italy	1:58.36	
21	1	5	Martin Binedell	South Africa	1:58.47	
22	3	1	Francisco Santos	Portugal	1:58.58	
23	2	8	Berke Saka	Turkey	1:58.66	
24	2	2	Kaloyan Levterov	Bulgaria	1:58.96	
25	3	7	Mewen Tomac	France	1:59.02	
26	1	6	Robert Glință	Romania	1:59.18	
27	3	8	Jakub Skierka	Poland	1:59.30	
28	1	3	Yakov Toumarkin	Israel	1:59.65	
29	1	2	Merdan Ataýew	Turkmenistan	2:03.68	

=== Semifinals ===
The swimmers with the best 8 times, regardless of heat, advanced to the final.

Rank	Heat	Lane	Swimmer	Nation	Time	Notes
1	1	4	Evgeny Rylov	ROC	1:54.45	Q
2	2	4	Luke Greenbank	Great Britain	1:54.98	Q
3	2	6	Ryan Murphy	United States	1:55.38	Q
4	1	1	Ádám Telegdy	Hungary	1:56.19	Q
5	2	1	Nicolás García	Spain	1:56.35	Q
6	2	5	Bryce Mefford	United States	1:56.37	Q
7	1	3	Radosław Kawęcki	Poland	1:56.68	Q
8	1	6	Ryosuke Irie	Japan	1:56.69	Q
9	1	8	Yohann Ndoye-Brouard	France	1:56.83	
10	1	2	Tristan Hollard	Australia	1:56.92	
11	1	5	Lee Ju-ho	South Korea	1:56.93	
12	2	3	Grigory Tarasevich	ROC	1:57.06	
13	2	7	Roman Mityukov	Switzerland	1:57.07	
14	2	2	Keita Sunama	Japan	1:57.16	
15	1	7	Brodie Williams	Great Britain	1:57.73	
16	2	8	Markus Thormeyer	Canada	1:59.36	

=== Final ===
Rank	Lane	Swimmer	Nation	Time	Notes
1st place, gold medalist(s)	4	Evgeny Rylov	ROC	1:53.27	OR
2nd place, silver medalist(s)	3	Ryan Murphy	United States	1:54.15	
3rd place, bronze medalist(s)	5	Luke Greenbank	Great Britain	1:54.72	
4	7	Bryce Mefford	United States	1:55.49	
5	6	Ádám Telegdy	Hungary	1:56.15	
6	1	Radosław Kawęcki	Poland	1:56.39	
7	8	Ryosuke Irie	Japan	1:57.32	
8	2	Nicolás García	Spain	1:59.06	
