= 2021 FINA World Swimming Championships (25 m) – Men's 200 metre backstroke =

Swimming competition

Men's 200 metre backstroke at the 2021 FINA World Swimming Championships (25 m)
- Venue: Etihad Arena
- Location: Abu Dhabi, United Arab Emirates
- Dates: 21 December (heats and final)
- Competitors: 35 from 27 nations
- Winning time: 1:48.68

Medalists
gold medal	Radosław Kawęcki	Poland
silver medal	Shaine Casas	United States
bronze medal	Christian Diener	Germany

The Men's 200 metre backstroke competition of the 2021 FINA World Swimming Championships (25 m) was held on 21 December 2021.

== Records ==
Prior to the competition, the existing world and championship records were as follows.

World record	Mitch Larkin (AUS)	1:45.63	Sydney, Australia	27 November 2015
Competition record	Ryan Lochte (USA)	1:46.68	Dubai, United Arab Emirates	19 December 2010

== Results ==
=== Heats ===
The heats were started at 09:37.

Rank	Heat	Lane	Name	Nationality	Time	Notes
1	3	1	Shaine Casas	United States	1:49.82	Q
2	3	3	Jan Čejka	Czech Republic	1:50.50	Q, NR
3	4	2	Yohann Ndoye Brouard	France	1:50.71	Q
4	3	4	Christian Diener	Germany	1:51.06	Q
5	2	4	Lorenzo Mora	Italy	1:51.58	Q
6	4	0	Antoine Herlem	France	1:51.93	Q
7	4	6	Armin Evert Lelle	Estonia	1:52.30	Q
8	4	4	Radosław Kawęcki	Poland	1:52.35	Q
9	4	5	Hugo González	Spain	1:52.47	
10	3	0	Hunter Tapp	United States	1:52.48	
11	3	5	Michele Lamberti	Italy	1:52.52	
12	4	3	Ádám Telegdy	Hungary	1:52.61	
13	2	3	Yakov Toumarkin	Israel	1:52.66	
14	4	7	Egor Dolomanov	Russian Swimming Federation	1:52.83	
15	2	8	Nicolás García	Spain	1:53.66	
16	2	5	Aleksei Tkachev	Russian Swimming Federation	1:54.02	
17	2	7	Berke Saka	Turkey	1:54.14	
18	3	8	Roman Mityukov	Switzerland	1:54.23	
19	3	7	Ole Braunschweig	Germany	1:54.37	
20	2	2	Yeziel Morales	Puerto Rico	1:54.46	
21	4	9	Francisco Santos	Portugal	1:54.54	
22	2	9	Wang Gukailai	China	1:55.02	
23	4	8	Kaloyan Levterov	Bulgaria	1:55.26	
24	2	6	Gabriel Fantoni	Brazil	1:55.44	
25	1	4	Vadym Naumenko	Ukraine	1:56.02	
26	3	6	Leonardo de Deus	Brazil	1:56.41	
27	1	7	Trần Hưng Nguyên	Vietnam	1:56.44	NR
28	1	6	Ng Cheuk Yin	Hong Kong	1:56.93	NR
29	3	9	Ziyad Saleem	Sudan	1:57.73	
30	3	2	Tomáš Franta	Czech Republic	1:59.64	
31	2	1	Charles Hockin	Paraguay	2:00.03	
32	1	3	Julio Pérez	Costa Rica	2:01.08	
33	1	5	Abdellah Ardjoune	Algeria	2:05.86	
34	1	1	Abdul Al-Kulaibi	Oman	2:08.20	
35	1	2	Faisal Al-Tannak	Kuwait	2:10.23	
	2	0	Lee Ju-ho	South Korea	DNS	
	4	1	Max Litchfield	Great Britain	DNS	

=== Final ===
The final was held at 18:56.

Rank	Lane	Name	Nationality	Time	Notes
1st place, gold medalist(s)	8	Radosław Kawęcki	Poland	1:48.68	
2nd place, silver medalist(s)	4	Shaine Casas	United States	1:48.81	
3rd place, bronze medalist(s)	6	Christian Diener	Germany	1:48.97	NR
4	2	Lorenzo Mora	Italy	1:49.27	NR
5	5	Jan Čejka	Czech Republic	1:49.93	NR
6	3	Yohann Ndoye Brouard	France	1:50.53	
7	1	Armin Evert Lelle	Estonia	1:51.20	NR
8	7	Antoine Herlem	France	1:52.92	
