= Swimming at the 2022 World Aquatics Championships – Men's 200 metre backstroke =

Men's 200 metre backstroke at the 2022 World Aquatics Championships
- Venue: Danube Arena
- Location: Budapest, Hungary
- Dates: 22 June (heats and semifinals); 23 June (final)
- Competitors: 42 from 37 nations
- Winning time: 1:54.52

Medalists
gold medal	Ryan Murphy	United States
silver medal	Luke Greenbank	Great Britain
bronze medal	Shaine Casas	United States

The Men's 200 metre backstroke competition at the 2022 World Aquatics Championships was held on 22 and 23 June 2022.

== Records ==
Prior to the competition, the existing world and championship records were as follows.

World record	Aaron Peirsol (USA)	1:51.92	Rome, Italy	31 July 2009
Competition record	Aaron Peirsol (USA)	1:51.92	Rome, Italy	31 July 2009

== Results ==
=== Heats ===
The heats were started on 22 June at 09:20.

Rank	Heat	Lane	Name	Nationality	Time	Notes
1	4	5	Shaine Casas	United States	1:56.66	Q
2	4	6	Joshua Edwards-Smith	Australia	1:56.85	Q
3	4	4	Ryan Murphy	United States	1:56.96	Q
4	3	2	Brodie Williams	Great Britain	1:57.09	Q
5	3	6	Mewen Tomac	France	1:57.21	Q
6	2	4	Luke Greenbank	Great Britain	1:57.33	Q
7	2	5	Ádám Telegdy	Hungary	1:57.82	Q
8	4	7	Benedek Kovács	Hungary	1:57.88	Q
9	2	6	Lee Ju-ho	South Korea	1:57.89	Q
10	3	5	Yohann Ndoye Brouard	France	1:58.10	Q
11	3	4	Mitch Larkin	Australia	1:58.58	Q
12	4	3	Roman Mityukov	Switzerland	1:58.61	Q
13	2	3	Jan Čejka	Czech Republic	1:58.65	Q
14	3	7	Evangelos Makrygiannis	Greece	1:59.25	Q
15	2	2	Hugo González	Spain	1:59.61	Q
16	3	1	Yeziel Morales	Puerto Rico	1:59.77	Q
17	4	1	Richie Stokes	Canada	1:59.86	
18	2	1	Erikas Grigaitis	Lithuania	1:59.92	
19	3	8	Omar Pinzón	Colombia	2:00.62	
20	3	3	Radosław Kawęcki	Poland	2:00.69	
21	2	7	Michele Lamberti	Italy	2:00.92	
22	2	8	Ziyad Ahmed	Sudan	2:01.05	NR
23	4	2	Oleksandr Zheltiakov	Ukraine	2:02.69	
24	4	8	Khiew Hoe Yean	Malaysia	2:03.12	
25	2	0	Armin Lelle	Estonia	2:03.58	
26	4	9	Mohamed Mohamady	Egypt	2:03.84	
27	3	0	Farrel Tangkas	Indonesia	2:04.84	
28	4	0	Patrick Groters	Aruba	2:05.90	
29	1	4	Ratthawit Thammananthachote	Thailand	2:07.12	
30	1	5	Elías Ardiles	Chile	2:07.92	
31	1	3	Ali Al-Essa	Saudi Arabia	2:15.66	

=== Semifinals ===
The semifinals were started on 22 June at 19:36.

Rank	Heat	Lane	Name	Nationality	Time	Notes
1	2	5	Ryan Murphy	United States	1:55.43	Q
2	1	5	Brodie Williams	Great Britain	1:56.17	Q
3	1	3	Luke Greenbank	Great Britain	1:56.42	Q
4	2	3	Mewen Tomac	France	1:56.52	Q
5	2	6	Ádám Telegdy	Hungary	1:56.80	Q
6	2	4	Shaine Casas	United States	1:56.90	Q
7	1	7	Roman Mityukov	Switzerland	1:57.08	Q
8	1	6	Benedek Kovács	Hungary	1:57.12	Q
9	2	7	Mitch Larkin	Australia	1:57.36	
10	1	2	Yohann Ndoye Brouard	France	1:57.38	
11	1	4	Joshua Edwards-Smith	Australia	1:57.52	
12	2	2	Lee Ju-ho	South Korea	1:57.55	
13	2	8	Hugo González	Spain	1:59.05	
14	2	1	Jan Čejka	Czech Republic	1:59.28	
15	1	1	Evangelos Makrygiannis	Greece	1:59.72	
16	1	8	Yeziel Morales	Puerto Rico	2:01.47	

=== Final ===
The final was held on 23 June at 19:01.

Rank	Lane	Name	Nationality	Time	Notes
1st place, gold medalist(s)	4	Ryan Murphy	United States	1:54.52	
2nd place, silver medalist(s)	3	Luke Greenbank	Great Britain	1:55.16	
3rd place, bronze medalist(s)	7	Shaine Casas	United States	1:55.35	
4	5	Brodie Williams	Great Britain	1:56.16	
5	6	Mewen Tomac	France	1:56.35	
6	2	Ádám Telegdy	Hungary	1:56.91	
7	1	Roman Mityukov	Switzerland	1:57.45	
8	8	Benedek Kovács	Hungary	1:58.52	
