= 2021 FINA World Swimming Championships (25 m) – Men's 100 metre backstroke =

Swimming competition

Men's 100 metre backstroke at the 2021 FINA World Swimming Championships (25 m)
- Venue: Etihad Arena
- Location: Abu Dhabi, United Arab Emirates
- Dates: 16 December (heats and semifinals); 17 December (final)
- Competitors: 56 from 49 nations
- Winning time: 49.23

Medalists
| gold medal | Shaine Casas | United States |
| silver medal | Kliment Kolesnikov |
| bronze medal | Robert Glință | Romania |

The Men's 100 metre backstroke competition of the 2021 FINA World Swimming Championships (25 m) was held on 16 and 17 December 2021.

== Records ==
Prior to the competition, the existing world and championship records were as follows.

| World record | Coleman Stewart (USA) | 48.33 | Naples, Italy | 29 August 2021 |
| Competition record | Stanislav Donets (RUS) | 48.95 | Dubai, United Arab Emirates | 19 December 2010 |

== Results ==
=== Heats ===
The heats were started on 16 December at 10:56.

| Rank | Heat | Lane | Name | Nationality | Time | Notes |
|---|---|---|---|---|---|---|
| 1 | 4 | 3 | Kacper Stokowski | Poland | 50.38 | Q |
| 1 | 4 | 4 | Guilherme Guido | Brazil | 50.38 | Q |
| 3 | 6 | 0 | Shaine Casas | United States | 50.40 | Q |
| 3 | 6 | 6 | Lorenzo Mora | Italy | 50.40 | Q |
| 5 | 4 | 5 | Pavel Samusenko | Russian Swimming Federation | 50.52 | Q |
| 6 | 6 | 4 | Kliment Kolesnikov | Russian Swimming Federation | 50.55 | Q |
| 7 | 5 | 5 | Apostolos Christou | Greece | 50.80 | Q |
| 8 | 5 | 4 | Robert Glință | Romania | 50.83 | Q |
| 9 | 6 | 5 | Christian Diener | Germany | 50.88 | Q |
| 10 | 5 | 3 | Gabriel Fantoni | Brazil | 50.92 | Q |
| 11 | 5 | 6 | Thomas Ceccon | Italy | 51.01 | Q |
| 12 | 5 | 2 | Tomáš Franta | Czech Republic | 51.04 | Q |
| 13 | 6 | 1 | Armin Evert Lelle | Estonia | 51.09 | Q, NR |
| 14 | 6 | 3 | Radosław Kawęcki | Poland | 51.25 | Q |
| 15 | 6 | 7 | Hugo González | Spain | 51.35 | Q |
| 16 | 4 | 7 | Markus Lie | Norway | 51.46 | QSO |
| 16 | 6 | 2 | Yohann Ndoye Brouard | France | 51.46 | QSO |
| 18 | 5 | 0 | Mewen Tomac | France | 51.50 | |
| 18 | 5 | 7 | Jan Čejka | Czech Republic | 51.50 | |
| 20 | 4 | 2 | Ole Braunschweig | Germany | 51.87 | |
| 21 | 5 | 1 | Rasim Oğulcan Gör | Turkey | 51.92 | |
| 22 | 5 | 9 | Ádám Telegdy | Hungary | 52.07 | |
| 23 | 3 | 4 | Roman Mityukov | Switzerland | 52.19 | |
| 24 | 4 | 6 | Viktar Staselovich | Belarus | 52.25 | |
| 25 | 4 | 1 | Yeziel Morales | Puerto Rico | 52.26 | |
| 26 | 5 | 8 | Won Young-jun | South Korea | 52.54 | |
| 27 | 4 | 8 | Francisco Santos | Portugal | 52.78 | |
| 28 | 4 | 9 | Srihari Nataraj | India | 52.81 | NR |
| 29 | 3 | 9 | Jack Kirby | Barbados | 52.82 | NR |
| 30 | 6 | 8 | Ronny Brännkärr | Finland | 52.90 | |
| 31 | 6 | 9 | Lau Shiu Yue | Hong Kong | 52.96 | |
| 32 | 3 | 6 | Kaloyan Levterov | Bulgaria | 53.21 | |
| 33 | 3 | 2 | Song Yukuan | China | 53.54 | |
| 34 | 2 | 5 | Max Mannes | Luxembourg | 53.63 | |
| 35 | 2 | 3 | Jerard Jacinto | Philippines | 53.69 | NR |
| 36 | 4 | 0 | Michael Laitarovsky | Israel | 53.82 | |
| 37 | 3 | 5 | Oleksandr Zheltiakov | Ukraine | 53.90 | |
| 38 | 3 | 8 | Charles Hockin | Paraguay | 54.22 | |
| 39 | 2 | 4 | I Gede Siman Sudartawa | Indonesia | 54.27 | |
| 40 | 3 | 1 | Tonnam Kanteemool | Thailand | 54.54 | NR |
| 41 | 2 | 1 | Akalanka Peiris | Sri Lanka | 54.83 | |
| 42 | 2 | 8 | Steven Aimable | Senegal | 54.86 | |
| 43 | 3 | 0 | Ziyad Saleem | Sudan | 54.99 | |
| 44 | 2 | 7 | Filippos Iakovidis | Cyprus | 55.00 | NR |
| 45 | 3 | 3 | Maximillian Wilson | United States Virgin Islands | 55.42 | |
| 46 | 2 | 2 | Julio Pérez | Costa Rica | 55.55 | |
| 47 | 2 | 9 | Felipe Jaramillo | Ecuador | 56.28 | |
| 48 | 3 | 7 | Abdellah Ardjoune | Algeria | 56.94 | |
| 49 | 2 | 0 | Ali Al-Zamil | Kuwait | 57.58 | |
| 50 | 1 | 4 | Mekhayl Engel | Curaçao | 57.98 | |
| 51 | 2 | 6 | Omar Al-Rowaila | Bahrain | 58.30 | |
| 52 | 1 | 6 | Juhn Tenorio | Northern Mariana Islands | 58.85 | |
| 53 | 1 | 3 | Rashad Alguliyev | Azerbaijan | 58.96 | |
| 54 | 1 | 2 | Juwel Ahmmed | Bangladesh | 59.81 | |
| 55 | 1 | 5 | Ahmed Al-Marzooqi | United Arab Emirates | 1:02.99 | |
| 56 | 1 | 7 | Ali Imaan | Maldives | 1:03.02 | |

==== Swim-off ====
The swim-off was held on 16 December at 12:42.

| Rank | Lane | Name | Nationality | Time | Notes |
|---|---|---|---|---|---|
| 1 | 5 | Yohann Ndoye Brouard | France | 51.09 | Q |
| 2 | 4 | Markus Lie | Norway | 51.21 | |

=== Semifinals ===
The semifinals were started on 16 December at 18:16.

| Rank | Heat | Lane | Name | Nationality | Time | Notes |
|---|---|---|---|---|---|---|
| 1 | 1 | 3 | Kliment Kolesnikov | Russian Swimming Federation | 49.57 | Q |
| 1 | 2 | 5 | Shaine Casas | United States | 49.57 | Q |
| 3 | 2 | 6 | Apostolos Christou | Greece | 49.89 | Q |
| 4 | 2 | 4 | Kacper Stokowski | Poland | 49.94 | Q |
| 5 | 1 | 5 | Lorenzo Mora | Italy | 49.99 | Q |
| 6 | 1 | 4 | Guilherme Guido | Brazil | 50.05 | Q |
| 7 | 2 | 3 | Pavel Samusenko | Russian Swimming Federation | 50.11 | Q |
| 8 | 1 | 6 | Robert Glință | Romania | 50.21 | Q |
| 9 | 2 | 7 | Thomas Ceccon | Italy | 50.22 | |
| 10 | 2 | 2 | Christian Diener | Germany | 50.30 | |
| 11 | 1 | 2 | Gabriel Fantoni | Brazil | 50.34 | |
| 12 | 1 | 7 | Tomáš Franta | Czech Republic | 50.59 | NR |
| 13 | 1 | 1 | Radosław Kawęcki | Poland | 50.88 | |
| 14 | 1 | 8 | Yohann Ndoye Brouard | France | 50.96 | |
| 15 | 2 | 1 | Armin Evert Lelle | Estonia | 51.00 | NR |
| 16 | 2 | 8 | Hugo González | Spain | 51.34 | |

=== Final ===
The final was held on 17 December at 18:07.

| Rank | Lane | Name | Nationality | Time | Notes |
|---|---|---|---|---|---|
| 1st place, gold medalist(s) | 5 | Shaine Casas | United States | 49.23 | |
| 2nd place, silver medalist(s) | 4 | Kliment Kolesnikov | Russian Swimming Federation | 49.46 | |
| 3rd place, bronze medalist(s) | 8 | Robert Glință | Romania | 49.60 | |
| 4 | 1 | Pavel Samusenko | Russian Swimming Federation | 49.65 | |
| 5 | 6 | Kacper Stokowski | Poland | 49.80 | |
| 5 | 7 | Guilherme Guido | Brazil | 49.80 | |
| 7 | 3 | Apostolos Christou | Greece | 49.91 | |
| 8 | 2 | Lorenzo Mora | Italy | 49.93 | |
