= Swimming at the 2020 European Aquatics Championships – Men's 100 metre backstroke =

Men's 100 metre backstroke at the 2020 European Aquatics Championships
- Venue: Danube Arena
- Dates: 19 May 2021 (heats and semifinals); 20 May 2021 (final)
- Competitors: 58 from 26 nations
- Winning time: 52.88

Medalists
gold medal	Robert Glință	Romania
silver medal	Hugo González	Spain
bronze medal	Apostolos Christou	Greece
bronze medal	Yohann Ndoye Brouard	France

The Men's 100 metre backstroke competition of the 2020 European Aquatics Championships was held on 19 and 20 May 2021.

== Records ==
Prior to the competition, the existing world, European and championship records were as follows.

	Name	Nationality	Time	Location	Date
World record	Ryan Murphy	United States	51.85	Rio de Janeiro	13 August 2016
European record Championship record	Camille Lacourt	France	52.11	Budapest	10 August 2010

== Results ==
=== Heats ===
The heats were started on 19 May at 10:30.

Rank	Heat	Lane	Name	Nationality	Time	Notes
1	5	4	Kliment Kolesnikov	Russia	52.32	Q
2	5	5	Yohann Ndoye Brouard	France	53.24	Q
3	5	3	Robert Glință	Romania	53.26	Q, NR
4	5	6	Hugo González	Spain	53.37	Q
4	6	4	Evgeny Rylov	Russia	53.37	Q
6	4	4	Thomas Ceccon	Italy	53.43	Q
7	4	5	Mewen Tomac	France	53.46	Q
8	6	3	Apostolos Christou	Greece	53.47	Q
9	6	5	Grigoriy Tarasevich	Russia	53.55	
10	6	1	Roman Mityukov	Switzerland	53.87	Q, WD
11	5	2	Luke Greenbank	Great Britain	53.92	Q
12	4	6	Richárd Bohus	Hungary	54.17	Q
13	5	8	Evangelos Makrygiannis	Greece	54.28	Q
14	4	1	Benedek Kovács	Hungary	54.29	Q
15	5	9	Jan Čejka	Czech Republic	54.33	Q
15	4	3	Simone Sabbioni	Italy	54.33	Q
17	6	8	Tomáš Franta	Czech Republic	54.45	Q
18	5	1	Kacper Stokowski	Poland	54.49	Q
19	6	2	Ádám Telegdy	Hungary	54.53	
20	3	5	Viktar Staselovich	Belarus	54.55	
21	4	2	Marek Ulrich	Germany	54.58	
22	6	9	Radosław Kawęcki	Poland	54.69	
23	3	8	João Costa	Portugal	54.70	NR
24	2	4	Francisco Santos	Portugal	54.72	
25	4	7	Joe Litchfield	Great Britain	54.83	
26	3	3	Thierry Bollin	Switzerland	54.86	
27	5	0	Maxence Orange	France	54.90	
28	3	4	Nicolás García	Spain	54.97	
29	3	6	Lorenzo Mora	Italy	54.98	
30	4	8	Brodie Williams	Great Britain	55.00	
31	3	7	Ksawery Masiuk	Poland	55.02	
32	3	2	Ádám Jászó	Hungary	55.18	
33	2	3	Gustav Hökfelt	Sweden	55.20	
34	3	9	Manuel Martos	Spain	55.21	
35	2	5	Tomasz Polewka	Poland	55.24	
36	4	9	Elliot Clogg	Great Britain	55.35	
37	2	2	Björn Kammann	Germany	55.63	
38	3	0	Armin Evert Lelle	Estonia	55.65	
39	6	0	Michael Laitarovsky	Israel	55.66	
40	4	0	Matteo Restivo	Italy	55.69	
41	2	7	Ģirts Feldbergs	Latvia	55.72	
42	5	7	Mikita Tsmyh	Belarus	55.73	
43	2	9	Erikas Grigaitis	Lithuania	55.80	
44	2	8	Max Mannes	Luxembourg	55.83	NR
45	3	1	Kaloyan Levterov	Bulgaria	56.06	
46	2	6	Adam Maraana	Israel	56.19	
47	2	0	David Gerchik	Israel	56.29	
48	6	6	Daniel Martin	Romania	56.38	
49	2	1	Saša Boškan	Slovenia	56.48	
50	1	4	Samuel Törnqvist	Sweden	57.00	
51	1	6	Primož Šenica Pavletič	Slovenia	57.16	
52	1	8	Alex Ahtiainen	Estonia	57.25	
53	1	7	Melikşah Düğen	Turkey	57.67	
54	1	3	Filippos Iakovidis	Cyprus	57.88	
55	1	2	Tomáš Ludvík	Czech Republic	58.19	
56	1	5	Kristinn Þórarinsson	Iceland	58.24	
57	1	1	Tryfonas Hadjichristoforou]	Cyprus	58.50	
58	1	0	Dren Ukimeraj	Kosovo	1:03.65	
	6	7	Bernhard Reitshammer	Austria	Did not start	

=== Semifinals ===
The semifinals were held on 19 May at 18:30.

==== Semifinal 1 ====
Rank	Lane	Name	Nationality	Time	Notes
1	6	Apostolos Christou	Greece	52.77	Q, NR
2	4	Yohann Ndoye Brouard	France	53.01	Q
3	5	Evgeny Rylov	Russia	53.15	q
4	3	Thomas Ceccon	Italy	53.34	q
5	7	Benedek Kovács	Hungary	54.36	
6	2	Richárd Bohus	Hungary	54.42	
7	8	Kacper Stokowski	Poland	54.47	
8	1	Simone Sabbioni	Italy	54.66	

==== Semifinal 2 ====
Rank	Lane	Name	Nationality	Time	Notes
1	6	Mewen Tomac	France	52.86	Q
2	5	Robert Glință	Romania	52.97	Q, NR
3	3	Hugo González	Spain	53.14	q
4	2	Luke Greenbank	Great Britain	53.69	q
5	1	Jan Čejka	Czech Republic	54.03	NR
6	8	Tomáš Franta	Czech Republic	54.21	
7	7	Evangelos Makrygiannis	Greece	54.32	
8	4	Kliment Kolesnikov	Russia	54.86	

=== Final ===
The final was held on 20 May at 18:06.

Rank	Lane	Name	Nationality	Time	Notes
1st place, gold medalist(s)	3	Robert Glință	Romania	52.88	NR
2nd place, silver medalist(s)	2	Hugo González	Spain	52.90	
3rd place, bronze medalist(s)	4	Apostolos Christou	Greece	52.97	
3rd place, bronze medalist(s)	6	Yohann Ndoye Brouard	France	52.97	
5	5	Mewen Tomac	France	53.00	
6	1	Thomas Ceccon	Italy	53.02	
7	8	Luke Greenbank	Great Britain	53.34	
8	7	Evgeny Rylov	Russia	53.51	
