= Swimming at the 2020 European Aquatics Championships – Men's 50 metre backstroke =

Swimming competition

Men's 50 metre backstroke at the 2020 European Aquatics Championships
- Venue: Danube Arena
- Dates: 17 May 2021 (heats and semifinals); 18 May 2021 (final)
- Competitors: 54 from 31 nations
- Winning time: 23.80

Medalists
gold medal	Kliment Kolesnikov	Russia
silver medal	Robert Glință	Romania
bronze medal	Hugo González	Spain

The Men's 50 metre backstroke competition of the 2020 European Aquatics Championships was held on 17 and 18 May 2021.

== Records ==
Before the competition, the existing world, European and championship records were as follows.

	Name	Nationality	Time	Location	Date
World record European record Championship record	Kliment Kolesnikov	Russia	24.00	Glasgow	4 August 2018

The following new records were set during this competition.

Date	Event	Name	Nationality	Time	Record
17 May	Semifinals	Kliment Kolesnikov	Russia	23.93	WR, CR
18 May	Final	Kliment Kolesnikov	Russia	23.80	WR, CR

== Results ==
=== Heats ===
The heats were started on 17 May at 10:53.

Rank	Heat	Lane	Name	Nationality	Time	Notes
1	6	4	Kliment Kolesnikov	Russia	24.23	Q
2	5	4	Robert Glință	Romania	24.51	Q
3	4	7	Hugo González	Spain	24.62	Q
4	4	4	Grigoriy Tarasevich	Russia	24.67	Q
5	6	5	Apostolos Christou	Greece	24.78	Q
6	5	3	Yohann Ndoye Brouard	France	24.96	Q
7	1	5	Marek Ulrich	Germany	24.98	Q
8	6	1	Ksawery Masiuk	Poland	25.05	Q
9	5	5	Richárd Bohus	Hungary	25.08	Q
10	6	3	Mikita Tsmyh	Belarus	25.09	Q
11	4	3	Simone Sabbioni	Italy	25.11	Q
12	5	1	Thomas Ceccon	Italy	25.14	Q
13	6	0	Conor Ferguson	Ireland	25.21	Q
14	6	6	Tomasz Polewka	Poland	25.23	Q
15	6	9	Alexis Santos	Portugal	25.28	Q, NR
15	6	7	Viktar Staselovich	Belarus	25.28	Q
17	5	7	Jan Čejka	Czech Republic	25.29	
17	5	6	Bernhard Reitshammer	Austria	25.29	
17	5	2	Bence Szentes	Hungary	25.29	
20	5	9	Kacper Stokowski	Poland	25.41	
21	4	8	Tomáš Franta	Czech Republic	25.42	
22	4	5	Michael Laitarovsky	Israel	25.44	
23	3	4	Tomoe Zenimoto Hvas	Norway	25.46	
24	4	2	Thierry Bollin	Switzerland	25.50	
25	4	6	Juan Segura	Spain	25.51	
26	4	1	Gustav Hökfelt	Sweden	25.52	
27	6	2	Benedek Kovács	Hungary	25.53	
28	1	3	Daniel Zaitsev	Estonia	25.62	
29	5	0	David Gerchik	Israel	25.64	
30	3	3	Grigori Pekarski	Belarus	25.69	
31	3	9	Nicolás García	Spain	25.71	
32	5	8	Lorenzo Mora	Italy	25.76	
33	4	9	Marvin Miglbauer	Austria	25.80	
34	3	6	Francisco Santos	Portugal	25.91	
35	3	5	Ádám Jászó	Hungary	25.93	
35	4	0	Maxence Orange	France	25.93	
35	6	8	Yakov Toumarkin	Israel	25.93	
38	3	0	Saša Boškan	Slovenia	25.98	
39	3	1	Manuel Martos	Spain	26.02	
40	2	2	Max Mannes	Luxembourg	26.14	
41	3	2	Kaloyan Levterov	Bulgaria	26.16	
42	2	3	Ģirts Feldbergs	Latvia	26.27	
43	3	8	Metin Aydın	Turkey	26.32	
44	2	1	Alex Ahtiainen	Estonia	26.42	
45	3	7	Adam Maraana	Israel	26.58	
46	2	7	Tryfonas Hadjichristoforou	Cyprus	26.62	
46	2	6	Filippos Iakovidis	Cyprus	26.62	
48	2	4	Kristinn Þórarinsson	Iceland	26.66	
49	2	5	Niko Mäkelä	Finland	26.85	
50	1	4	Denys Kesil	Ukraine	27.11	
51	2	8	Alex Kušík	Slovakia	27.14	
52	2	0	Tomáš Ludvík	Czech Republic	27.27	
53	1	6	Artur Barseghyan	Armenia	27.76	
54	2	9	Dren Ukimeraj	Kosovo	29.02	

=== Semifinals ===
The semifinals were held on 17 May at 18:24.

==== Semifinal 1 ====
Rank	Lane	Name	Nationality	Time	Notes
1	4	Robert Glință	Romania	24.57	Q
2	5	Grigoriy Tarasevich	Russia	24.68	Q
3	3	Yohann Ndoye Brouard	France	25.11	
4	1	Tomasz Polewka	Poland	25.23	
5	6	Ksawery Masiuk	Poland	25.25	
6	7	Thomas Ceccon	Italy	25.26	
7	2	Mikita Tsmyh	Belarus	25.36	
2	8	Alexis Santos	Portugal	25.40	

==== Semifinal 2 ====
Rank	Lane	Name	Nationality	Time	Notes
1	4	Kliment Kolesnikov	Russia	23.93	Q, WR
2	3	Apostolos Christou	Greece	24.49	Q, NR
3	5	Hugo González	Spain	24.60	q
4	1	Conor Ferguson	Ireland	24.81	q
5	7	Simone Sabbioni	Italy	25.02	q
5	8	Viktar Staselovich	Belarus	25.02	q
7	6	Marek Ulrich	Germany	25.03	
8	2	Richárd Bohus	Hungary	25.19	

=== Final ===
The final was held on 18 May at 19:18.

Rank	Lane	Name	Nationality	Time	Notes
1st place, gold medalist(s)	4	Kliment Kolesnikov	Russia	23.80	WR
2nd place, silver medalist(s)	3	Robert Glință	Romania	24.42	
3rd place, bronze medalist(s)	6	Hugo González	Spain	24.47	NR
4	5	Apostolos Christou	Greece	24.59	
5	2	Grigoriy Tarasevich	Russia	24.72	
6	1	Viktar Staselovich	Belarus	24.89	
7	7	Conor Ferguson	Ireland	24.92	
7	8	Simone Sabbioni	Italy	24.92	
