= Andrey Shishin =

Russian swimming coach

Andrey Gennadyevich Shishin
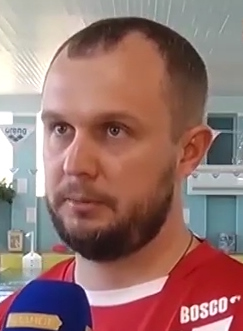
- Born: June 22, 1983 (age 43); Orsk, Orenburg Oblast, Soviet Union
- Occupation: Swimming coach
- Awards: Honored Coach of Russia (2017); Order of Friendship

Andrey Gennadyevich Shishin (Russian: Андрей Геннадьевич Шишин; born June 22, 1983, Orsk) is a Russian coach-instructor in swimming and Master of Sports of Russia in swimming. He is the head coach of the Russian national swimming team (2025). In 2017, he was awarded the title of Honored Coach of Russia. In 2021, his trainee Evgeny Rylov won the first Olympic gold medal in men's swimming for the Russian national team since 1996. Shishin is also the recipient of the Order of Friendship (2022).

== Biography ==
Andrey Shishin was born on June 22, 1983, in the city of Orsk, Orenburg Oblast. He graduated from secondary school No. 18 in Novotroitsk and Orenburg State Pedagogical University. His father is swimming coach Gennady Viktorovich Shishin.

From 2004 to 2006, Andrey Gennadyevich worked at the "Volna" swimming pool in the city of Novotroitsk.

From 2006 to 2022, he was a senior coach-instructor at the sports school "Dolphin" (Vidnoye).

Since 2010, he has been a coach at the Center for Sports Training for Olympic Sports of the Moscow Oblast. Since 2013, he has been a coach for the Russian national swimming team.

In 2017, Shishin was awarded the honorary title of "Honored Coach of Russia".

In 2024, he was appointed senior coach of the Russian national swimming team.

In 2025, he was recommended by the Russian Swimming Federation for the position of head coach of the Russian national swimming team. At the 2025 World Aquatics Championships in Singapore, Andrey Shishin served as the head coach for the Russian national swimming team.

== Notable students ==
- Evgeny Rylov - two-time Olympic champion (the first Russian athlete to win Olympic gold in pool swimming in the 21st century), silver medalist at the 2020 Olympic Games, bronze medalist at the 2016 Olympic Games, two-time world champion, three-time world champion in short course, four-time European champion, three-time champion of the Youth Olympic Games. Honored Master of Sports of Russia.
- Ivan Girev - silver medalist at the 2020 Olympic Games, silver medalist at the World Championships in long course (2019) and short course (2018) in the 4 × 200 m freestyle relay, multiple-time European champion. Honored Master of Sports of Russia.
- Aleksei Brianskiy - four-time 2016 World Champion in short course, participant in the 2016 Olympic Games in the 50-meter freestyle, two-time champion of the first European Games in Baku, multiple medalist of the Russian Championships, bronze medalist of the 2017 Summer Universiade, bronze medalist of the World Junior Swimming Championships, Honored Master of Sports of Russia.

== Awards and titles ==
- Award of the All-Russian Swimming Federation in the category "Coach of the Year" (2014, 2015, 2016).
- Winner of the district competition "Teacher of the Year of the Leninsky Municipal District".
- 1st degree diploma winner of the regional stage of the VIII All-Russian competition for teachers of supplementary education "I Give My Heart to Children".
- Awarded the badge of the Governor of the Moscow Oblast "I Thank".
- Honorary title "Honored Coach of Russia" (2017).
- Badge "For Merit to the Moscow Oblast" III degree. (2021).
- Order of Friendship for the successful training of athletes at the Olympic Games (2022).

== Public activities ==
From September 2017 to January 2020, Shishin held the post of deputy of the Council of Deputies of the Vidnoye urban settlement (district No. 10), nominated by the United Russia party.

Since September 2024, he has been a deputy of the Leninsky urban district of the Moscow Oblast.

As part of his parliamentary activities, Shishin deals with issues of sports, youth policy, and the development of sports infrastructure. He develops swimming for older people in the "Active Longevity" project and is also working on a rehabilitation program for participants of the Russian invasion fo Ukraine.

== Quote ==
...our main concern – both for personal coaches and national team coaches – is to help the athletes fully reveal themselves, realize all their abilities and opportunities, and then even Olympic gold will not become the limit of their dreams.
