= Swimming at the 2018 European Aquatics Championships – Men's 200 metre backstroke =

Men's 200 metre backstroke at the 2018 European Aquatics Championships
- Venue: Tollcross International Swimming Centre
- Dates: 7 August (heats and semifinals); 8 August (final)
- Competitors: 39 from 22 nations
- Winning time: 1:53.36

Medalists
gold medal	Evgeny Rylov	Russia
silver medal	Radosław Kawęcki	Poland
bronze medal	Matteo Restivo	Italy

The Men's 200 metre backstroke competition of the 2018 European Aquatics Championships was held on 7 and 8 August 2018.

== Records ==
Prior to the competition, the existing world and championship records were as follows.

	Name	Nation	Time	Location	Date
World record	Aaron Peirsol	United States	1:51.92	Rome	31 July 2009
European record	Evgeny Rylov	Russia	1:53.61	Budapest	28 July 2017
Championship record	Radosław Kawęcki	Poland	1:55.28	Debrecen	26 May 2012

The following new records were set during this competition.

Date	Event	Name	Nationality	Time	Record
8 August	Final	Evgeny Rylov	Russia	1:53.36	CR, ER

== Results ==
=== Heats ===
The heats were started on 7 August at 09:41.

Rank	Heat	Lane	Name	Nationality	Time	Notes
1	5	4	Evgeny Rylov	Russia	1:56.67	Q
2	4	2	Grigoriy Tarasevich	Russia	1:57.07	Q
3	4	4	Kliment Kolesnikov	Russia	1:57.31	
4	5	3	Christian Diener	Germany	1:57.89	Q
5	3	7	Brodie Williams	Great Britain	1:58.62	Q
6	3	4	Radosław Kawęcki	Poland	1:58.70	Q
7	4	5	Ádám Telegdy	Hungary	1:58.96	Q
8	5	2	Luca Mencarini	Italy	1:59.09	Q
9	3	6	Luke Greenbank	Great Britain	1:59.21	Q
9	4	3	Matteo Restivo	Italy	1:59.21	Q
11	5	1	Apostolos Christou	Greece	1:59.30	Q
12	4	6	Jakub Skierka	Poland	1:59.44	Q
13	3	2	Craig McNally	Great Britain	1:59.58	
14	4	1	Maxim Stupin	Russia	1:59.60	
15	3	5	Hugo González	Spain	1:59.73	Q
16	3	3	Geoffroy Mathieu	France	1:59.83	Q
17	5	6	Yakov Toumarkin	Israel	2:00.08	Q
18	5	0	Anton Lončar	Croatia	2:00.11	Q
19	2	2	Gabriel Lópes	Portugal	2:00.35	Q
20	4	7	Maxence Orange	France	2:00.72	
21	3	0	João Vital	Portugal	2:00.98	
22	5	9	Tomáš Franta	Czech Republic	2:01.51	
23	2	7	Ivan Gajšek	Croatia	2:02.05	
24	3	9	Gytis Stankevičius	Lithuania	2:02.48	
25	5	7	Mikita Tsmyh	Belarus	2:02.50	
26	4	9	Roman Dmytrijev	Czech Republic	2:02.97	
27	2	8	Ege Başer	Turkey	2:03.08	
28	4	8	Nikolaos Sofianidis	Greece	2:03.21	
29	2	4	Georgios Spanoudakis	Greece	2:03.69	
30	3	8	David Gamburg	Israel	2:03.82	
31	2	5	Rokas Juozelskis	Lithuania	2:03.84	
32	2	9	Armin Lelle	Estonia	2:04.26	
33	5	8	Nils Liess	Switzerland	2:04.53	
34	2	1	Girts Feldbergs	Latvia	2:04.59	
35	3	1	Paul Bedel	France	2:05.51	
35	2	0	Patrick Staber	Austria	2:05.51	
37	1	5	Berk Özkul	Turkey	2:05.99	
38	2	6	Adam Černek	Slovakia	2:06.39	
39	1	3	Thomas Wareing	Malta	2:08.70	
	1	4	Metin Aydın	Turkey	Did not start	
	4	0	Gustav Höfkelt	Sweden	Did not start	
	5	5	Danas Rapšys	Lithuania	Did not start	

=== Semifinals ===
The semifinals were started on 7 August at 17:01.

==== Semifinal 1 ====
Rank	Lane	Name	Nationality	Time	Notes
1	4	Grigoriy Tarasevich	Russia	1:57.62	Q
2	2	Apostolos Christou	Greece	1:58.14	Q
3	7	Hugo González	Spain	1:58.43	Q
4	5	Brodie Williams	Great Britain	1:58.66	
5	6	Luke Greenbank	Great Britain	1:58.84	
6	3	Ádám Telegdy	Hungary	1:59.05	
7	1	Yakov Toumarkin	Israel	2:00.67	
8	8	Gabriel Lópes	Portugal	2:00.85	

==== Semifinal 2 ====
Rank	Lane	Name	Nationality	Time	Notes
1	4	Evgeny Rylov	Russia	1:55.50	Q
2	3	Radosław Kawęcki	Poland	1:57.56	Q
3	2	Matteo Restivo	Italy	1:57.80	Q
4	6	Luca Mencarini	Italy	1:57.83	Q
5	5	Christian Diener	Germany	1:57.92	Q
6	1	Geoffroy Mathieu	France	1:58.65	
7	8	Anton Lončar	Croatia	1:59.86	
7	7	Jakub Skierka	Poland	1:59.86	

=== Final ===
The final was started on 8 August at 17:32.

Rank	Lane	Name	Nationality	Time	Notes
1st place, gold medalist(s)	4	Evgeny Rylov	Russia	1:53.36	ER, CR
2nd place, silver medalist(s)	5	Radosław Kawęcki	Poland	1:56.07	
3rd place, bronze medalist(s)	6	Matteo Restivo	Italy	1:56.29	
4	7	Christian Diener	Germany	1:57.05	
5	1	Apostolos Christou	Greece	1:57.09	
6	3	Grigoriy Tarasevich	Russia	1:57.37	
7	2	Luca Mencarini	Italy	1:57.71	
8	8	Hugo González	Spain	1:59.06	
