= Swimming at the 2020 Summer Olympics – Men's 100 metre backstroke =

Men's 100 metre backstroke at the Games of the XXXII Olympiad
- Venue: Tokyo Aquatics Centre
- Dates: 25 July 2021 (heats); 26 July 2021 (semifinals); 27 July 2021 (final)
- Competitors: 41 from 30 nations
- Winning time: 51.98

Medalists
1st place, gold medalist(s)		Evgeny Rylov	ROC
2nd place, silver medalist(s)		Kliment Kolesnikov	ROC
3rd place, bronze medalist(s)		Ryan Murphy	United States

The men's 100 metre backstroke event at the 2020 Summer Olympics was held from 25 to 27 July 2021 at the Tokyo Aquatics Centre. It was the event's twenty-sixth appearance, having been held at every edition since 1904 except 1964. Moreover, these Games marked the first time when the men's sprint backstroke event was held in Tokyo, as the event was not included in the swimming program in 1964.

Traditionally, the event has been dominated by Americans, who have won 15 gold medals in 25 Olympic men's 100 metre backstroke competitions, and all gold medals in the event since 1996. This time, 2016 Olympic bronze medalist and 2019 World Championship silver medalist Evgeny Rylov edged his compatriot Kliment Kolesnikov and defending Olympic champion and world record holder Ryan Murphy, who did not medal in 2019, to win first gold by a Russian in this event and also the first gold medal in swimming by a Russian since Larisa Ilchenko won the open water competition in 2008. Rylov subsequently repeated the gold medal performance in his signature 200 metres backstroke race.

Leading at the turn by 6 one-hundredths of a second over Rylov, Kolesnikov could not maintain his lead and settled for silver just 0.02 seconds behind in 52.00. Despite a late charge, Murphy could not overtake the Russian duo, settling for bronze in 52.19.

Italy's Thomas Ceccon clocked a national record of 52.30 to fall short of the podium, placing fourth. Meanwhile China's two-time defending World champion Xu Jiayu (52.51) fell to fifth, while Spain's Hugo González (52.78) edged Australia's Mitch Larkin (52.79) by one one-hundredth of a second to take sixth. Romania's Robert Glință (52.95) clocked a sub-53 time to round out the field.

== Records ==
Prior to this competition, the existing world and Olympic records were as follows.

World record	Ryan Murphy (USA)	51.85	Rio de Janeiro, Brazil	13 August 2016
Olympic record	Ryan Murphy (USA)	51.85	Rio de Janeiro, Brazil	13 August 2016

No new records were set during the competition.

== Qualification ==
The Olympic Qualifying Time for the event was 53.85 seconds. Up to two swimmers per National Olympic Committee (NOC) could automatically qualify by swimming that time at an approved qualification event. The Olympic Selection Time was 55.47 seconds. Up to one swimmer per NOC meeting that time was eligible for selection, allocated by world ranking until the maximum quota for all swimming events is reached. NOCs without a male swimmer qualified in any event could also use their universality place.

== Competition format ==
The competition consisted of three rounds: heats, semifinals, and a final. The swimmers with the best 16 times in the heats advanced to the semifinals. The swimmers with the best 8 times in the semifinals advanced to the final.

== Schedule ==
All times are Japan Standard Time (UTC+9)

Date	Time	Round
25 July 2021	19:51	Heats
26 July 2021	11:31	Semifinals
27 July 2021	10:59	Final

== Results ==
=== Heats ===
The swimmers with the top 16 times, regardless of heat, advanced to the semifinals.

Rank	Heat	Lane	Swimmer	Nation	Time	Notes
1	5	4	Kliment Kolesnikov	ROC	52.15	Q
2	5	3	Thomas Ceccon	Italy	52.49	Q, NR
3	4	4	Xu Jiayu	China	52.70	Q
4	5	5	Mitch Larkin	Australia	52.97	Q
5	5	2	Ryosuke Irie	Japan	52.99	Q
6	6	2	Yohann Ndoye-Brouard	France	53.13	Q
7	6	4	Evgeny Rylov	ROC	53.22	Q
7	6	5	Ryan Murphy	United States	53.22	Q
9	5	6	Hugo González	Spain	53.45	Q
10	4	3	Mewen Tomac	France	53.49	Q
11	4	6	Guilherme Guido	Brazil	53.65	Q
12	6	6	Robert Glință	Romania	53.67	Q
13	4	7	Isaac Cooper	Australia	53.73	Q
14	3	5	Marek Ulrich	Germany	53.74	Q
15	4	5	Hunter Armstrong	United States	53.77	Q
15	6	3	Apostolos Christou	Greece	53.77	Q
17	4	2	Luke Greenbank	Great Britain	53.79	
17	5	7	Simone Sabbioni	Italy	53.79	
19	6	7	Markus Thormeyer	Canada	53.80	
20	3	8	Guilherme Basseto	Brazil	53.84	
20	5	8	Lee Ju-ho	South Korea	53.84	
22	3	2	Quah Zheng Wen	Singapore	53.94	
23	2	6	Kacper Stokowski	Poland	53.99	
24	5	1	Pieter Coetze	South Africa	54.05	
25	3	4	Ole Braunschweig	Germany	54.14	
26	6	1	Cole Pratt	Canada	54.27	
27	3	6	Srihari Nataraj	India	54.31	
28	2	2	Francisco Santos	Portugal	54.35	NR
29	4	8	Ádám Telegdy	Hungary	54.42	
30	2	5	Jan Čejka	Czech Republic	54.69	
31	3	7	Yakov Toumarkin	Israel	54.81	
32	2	3	Dylan Carter	Trinidad and Tobago	54.82	
33	3	1	Mikita Tsmyh	Belarus	54.88	
34	1	4	Merdan Atayev	Turkmenistan	55.24	
35	3	3	Bernhard Reitshammer	Austria	55.26	
36	2	4	Michael Laitarovsky	Israel	55.34	
37	2	7	Kaloyan Levterov	Bulgaria	55.60	
38	4	1	Daniel Martin	Romania	56.91	
39	1	5	Gabriel Castillo	Bolivia	58.24	
40	1	3	Heriniavo Rasolonjatovo	Madagascar	59.81	
—	6	8	Richárd Bohus	Hungary	DSQ	

=== Semifinals ===
The swimmers with the best 8 times, regardless of heat, advanced to the final.

Rank	Heat	Lane	Swimmer	Nation	Time	Notes
1	1	6	Ryan Murphy	United States	52.24	Q
2	2	4	Kliment Kolesnikov	ROC	52.29	Q
3	1	5	Mitch Larkin	Australia	52.76	Q
4	1	4	Thomas Ceccon	Italy	52.78	Q
5	2	6	Evgeny Rylov	ROC	52.91	Q
6	2	5	Xu Jiayu	China	52.94	Q
7	2	2	Hugo González	Spain	53.05	Q
8	1	7	Robert Glință	Romania	53.20	Q
9	2	3	Ryosuke Irie	Japan	53.21	
9	2	8	Hunter Armstrong	United States	53.21	
11	1	8	Apostolos Christou	Greece	53.41	
12	2	1	Isaac Cooper	Australia	53.43	
13	1	1	Marek Ulrich	Germany	53.54	
14	1	2	Mewen Tomac	France	53.62	
15	2	7	Guilherme Guido	Brazil	53.80	
—	1	3	Yohann Ndoye-Brouard	France	DSQ	

=== Final ===
Rank	Lane	Swimmer	Nation	Time	Notes
1st place, gold medalist(s)	2	Evgeny Rylov	ROC	51.98	ER
2nd place, silver medalist(s)	5	Kliment Kolesnikov	ROC	52.00	
3rd place, bronze medalist(s)	4	Ryan Murphy	United States	52.19	
4	6	Thomas Ceccon	Italy	52.30	NR
5	7	Xu Jiayu	China	52.51	
6	1	Hugo González	Spain	52.78	
7	3	Mitch Larkin	Australia	52.79	
8	8	Robert Glință	Romania	52.95	
