= Mefford =

Mefford is a surname. Notable people with the surname include:

- Bryce Mefford (born 1998), American swimmer
- Hal Mefford (1882–1932), American football player, coach of football and basketball, and college athletics administrator
