= Swimming at the 2026 European Aquatics Championships – Men's 200 metre individual medley =

Men's 200 metre individual medley at the 2026 European Aquatics Championships
- Venue: Paris Aquatic Centre
- Dates: 15 August (heats and semifinals); 16 August (final)
- Competitors: 48 from 26 nations
- Winning time: 1:54.24 CR

Medalists
gold medal	Hubert Kós	Hungary
silver medal	Hugo González	Spain
bronze medal	Mikhail Shcherbakov

The Men's 200 metre individual medley competition of the 2026 European Aquatics Championships was held on 15 and 16 August 2026.

== Records ==
Prior to the competition, the existing world, European and championship records were as follows.

	Time	Swimmer	Location	Date
World record	1:52.69	Leon Marchand (FRA)	Singapore	30 July 2025
European record	1:52.69	Leon Marchand (FRA)	Singapore	30 July 2025
Championship record	1:56.66	Laszlo Cseh (HUN)	Debrecen	23 May 2012

== Results ==
=== Heats ===
The heats were started on 15 August at 10:36.
Qualification Rules: The 16 fastest from the heats qualify to the semifinals.

Rank	Heat	Lane	Swimmer	Country	Time	Notes
1	4	4	Duncan Scott	Great Britain	1:57.51	Q
2	3	4	Mikhail Shcherbakov	Neutral Athletes B	1:58.16	Q
3	4	3	Max Litchfield	Great Britain	1:58.43	Q
4	5	5	Ilya Borodin	Neutral Athletes B	1:58.58	Q
5	5	3	Evan Jones	Great Britain	1:58.71	
6	4	2	Hugo González	Spain	1:58.77	Q
7	3	5	Jacopo Barbotti	Italy	1:58.79	Q
8	5	4	Hubert Kós	Hungary	1:58.82	Q
9	5	8	Eitan Ben Shitrit	Israel	1:59.11	Q
10	5	6	Thomas Dean	Great Britain	1:59.30	
11	5	2	Alexey Glivinskiy	Israel	1:59.31	Q
12	3	1	Vadym Naumenko	Ukraine	1:59.53	Q
13	3	2	Nil Cadevall	Spain	1:59.67	Q
14	4	1	Jan Čejka	Czech Republic	1:59.73	Q, NR
15	4	5	Alberto Razzetti	Italy	1:59.80	Q
16	5	7	Maxim Stupin	Neutral Athletes B	1:59.88	
17	3	8	Finn Hammer	Germany	1:59.89	Q
18	5	1	Thomas Jansen	Netherlands	2:00.03	Q
19	4	0	Daniil Giourtzidis	Greece	2:00.12	Q
20	4	7	Cedric Büssing	Germany	2:00.25	
21	4	8	Iason Routoulas	Greece	2:00.28	
22	4	6	Robert Badea	Romania	2:00.57	
23	3	3	Berke Saka	Turkey	2:00.62	
24	3	7	Gian-Luca Gartmann	Switzerland	2:00.84	
25	4	9	Matei State	Romania	2:01.62	
26	2	2	Samuel Košťál	Slovakia	2:01.63	NR
27	2	6	Panagiotis Vlachogiannakos	Greece	2:01.92	
28	5	9	Jack Cassin	Ireland	2:02.15	
29	1	3	Oliver Kuulpak	Estonia	2:02.59	
30	2	1	Ronny Brännkärr	Finland	2:02.70	
31	2	4	Jacob Armon	Ireland	2:02.84	
32	2	5	Mathias Christensen	Denmark	2:03.14	
33	1	0	Charlie Egeland	Norway	2:03.22	
34	2	8	Noah Zemansky	Austria	2:03.24	
35	5	0	Christian Giefing	Austria	2:03.30	
36	2	9	Michal Judickij	Czech Republic	2:03.62	
37	2	7	Finn Kemp	Luxembourg	2:03.72	
38	3	6	Apostolos Papastamos	Greece	2:03.75	
39	1	8	Liam Custer	Ireland	2:03.83	
40	3	9	Darius Coman	Romania	2:04.49	
41	1	1	Laurin Korber-Perner	Austria	2:04.86	
42	2	0	Strahinja Maslo	Serbia	2:05.02	
43	2	3	František Jablčník	Slovakia	2:05.06	
44	1	4	Birnir Freyr Halfdanarsson	Iceland	2:05.18	
45	1	2	Eetu Autio	Finland	2:05.33	
46	1	6	Emils Krampe	Latvia	2:06.22	
47	1	7	Zhulian Lavdaniti	Albania	2:07.88	
48	1	5	Nikolass Deičmans	Latvia	2:12.16	
	3	0	Timo Sorgius	Germany	DNS	

=== Semifinals ===
The semifinals were started on 15 August at 20:02.

Rank	Heat	Lane	Name	Nationality	Time	Notes
1	2	3	Hugo González	Spain	1:56.61	Q, CR
2	2	6	Hubert Kós	Hungary	1:56.73	Q
3	1	4	Mikhail Shcherbakov	Neutral Athletes B	1:57.37	Q
4	2	1	Alberto Razzetti	Italy	1:57.46	Q
5	2	4	Duncan Scott	Great Britain	1:57.49	Q
6	2	5	Max Litchfield	Great Britain	1:57.96	Q
7	1	5	Ilya Borodin	Neutral Athletes B	1:58.32	Q
8	1	7	Jan Čejka	Czech Republic	1:58.33	Q, NR
9	1	3	Jacopo Barbotti	Italy	1:58.60	
10	1	6	Eitan Ben Shitrit	Israel	1:59.31	
11	1	1	Finn Hammer	Germany	1:59.52	
12	1	2	Vadym Naumenko	Ukraine	1:59.85	
13	2	8	Thomas Jansen	Netherlands	2:00.10	
14	2	7	Nil Cadevall	Spain	2:00.78	
15	1	8	Daniil Giourtzidis	Greece	2:00.86	
16	2	2	Alexey Glivinskiy	Israel	2:01.53	

=== Final ===
The final was held on 16 August at 18:40.

Rank	Lane	Name	Nationality	Time	Notes
1st place, gold medalist(s)	5	Hubert Kós	Hungary	1:54.24	CR
2nd place, silver medalist(s)	4	Hugo González	Spain	1:54.44	NR
3rd place, bronze medalist(s)	3	Mikhail Shcherbakov	Neutral Athletes B	1:56.16	WJ, NR
4	2	Duncan Scott	Great Britain	1:56.32	
5	6	Alberto Razzetti	Italy	1:56.60	
6	7	Max Litchfield	Great Britain	1:58.24	
7	8	Jan Čejka	Czech Republic	1:59.16	
8	1	Ilya Borodin	Neutral Athletes B	1:59.62	
