= Swimming at the 2019 World Aquatics Championships – Men's 200 metre backstroke =

Men's 200 metre backstroke at the 2019 World Aquatics Championships
- Venue: Nambu University Municipal Aquatics Center
- Location: Gwangju, South Korea
- Dates: 25 July (heats and semifinals); 26 July (final)
- Competitors: 42 from 36 nations
- Winning time: 1:53.40

Medalists
gold medal	Evgeny Rylov	Russia
silver medal	Ryan Murphy	United States
bronze medal	Luke Greenbank	Great Britain

The Men's 200 Metre Backstroke competition at the 2019 World Championships was held on 25 and 26 July 2019.

== Records ==
Prior to the competition, the existing world and championship records were as follows.

World record	Aaron Peirsol (USA)	1:51.92	Rome, Italy	31 July 2009
Competition record	Aaron Peirsol (USA)	1:51.92	Rome, Italy	31 July 2009

== Results ==
=== Heats ===
The heats were held on 25 July at 10:28.

Rank	Heat	Lane	Name	Nationality	Time	Notes
1	4	4	Ryan Murphy	United States	1:56.61	Q
2	5	4	Evgeny Rylov	Russia	1:56.76	Q
3	4	3	Luke Greenbank	Great Britain	1:56.83	Q
4	3	3	Radosław Kawęcki	Poland	1:56.99	Q
5	3	5	Xu Jiayu	China	1:57.15	Q, WD
6	3	2	Ádám Telegdy	Hungary	1:57.20	Q
7	5	5	Ryosuke Irie	Japan	1:57.60	Q
8	4	2	Christian Diener	Germany	1:57.61	Q
8	5	8	Jakub Skierka	Poland	1:57.61	Q
10	5	6	Matteo Restivo	Italy	1:57.67	Q
11	3	8	Daniel Cristian Martin	Romania	1:57.76	Q
12	3	1	Lee Ju-ho	South Korea	1:57.80	Q
13	5	7	Grigoriy Tarasevich	Russia	1:57.99	Q
14	5	2	Danas Rapšys	Lithuania	1:58.04	Q
14	5	9	Roman Mityukov	Switzerland	1:58.04	Q, NR
16	5	3	Jacob Pebley	United States	1:58.07	Q
17	5	1	Markus Thormeyer	Canada	1:58.16	Q
18	4	6	Bradley Woodward	Australia	1:58.31	
19	4	5	Keita Sunama	Japan	1:58.40	
20	3	7	Christopher Reid	South Africa	1:58.44	
21	3	6	Li Guangyuan	China	1:58.57	
22	4	1	Leonardo de Deus	Brazil	1:58.74	
23	3	0	Anton Loncar	Croatia	1:59.07	
24	4	7	Apostolos Christou	Greece	1:59.42	
25	5	0	Yakov Toumarkin	Israel	1:59.79	
26	4	8	Cole Pratt	Canada	2:00.45	
27	2	4	Tomáš Franta	Czech Republic	2:00.52	
28	2	1	Yeziel Morales	Puerto Rico	2:01.13	
29	2	2	Ivan Štšeglov	Estonia	2:01.19	NR
30	3	9	Mikita Tsmyh	Belarus	2:01.44	
31	4	0	Hugo González	Spain	2:01.84	
32	2	8	Srihari Nataraj	India	2:02.08	NR
33	4	9	Conor Ferguson	Ireland	2:02.37	
34	2	5	Gabriel Lópes	Portugal	2:03.33	
35	2	3	Chuang Mu-lun	Chinese Taipei	2:03.73	
36	2	7	Omar Pinzón	Colombia	2:04.76	
37	2	6	Armando Barrera	Cuba	2:05.23	
38	2	0	Erick Gordillo	Guatemala	2:05.53	
39	1	4	Ng Cheuk Yin	Hong Kong	2:06.64	
40	1	5	Matthew Mays	Virgin Islands	2:07.03	
41	2	9	Patrick Groters	Aruba	2:10.25	
42	1	3	Ali Imaan	Maldives	2:33.23	
	3	4	Mitch Larkin	Australia	DNS	

=== Semifinals ===
The semifinals were held on 25 July at 21:35.

==== Semifinal 1 ====
Rank	Lane	Name	Nationality	Time	Notes
1	4	Evgeny Rylov	Russia	1:55.48	Q
2	8	Markus Thormeyer	Canada	1:56.96	Q, NR
3	5	Radosław Kawęcki	Poland	1:57.24	Q
4	3	Ryosuke Irie	Japan	1:57.26	Q
5	2	Daniel Cristian Martin	Romania	1:57.66	
6	7	Grigoriy Tarasevich	Russia	1:57.72	
7	1	Roman Mityukov	Switzerland	1:57.93	NR
	6	Jakub Skierka	Poland	DSQ	

==== Semifinal 2 ====
Rank	Lane	Name	Nationality	Time	Notes
1	4	Ryan Murphy	United States	1:56.25	Q
2	5	Luke Greenbank	Great Britain	1:56.60	Q
3	8	Jacob Pebley	United States	1:56.65	Q
4	3	Ádám Telegdy	Hungary	1:57.07	Q
5	6	Christian Diener	Germany	1:57.33	
6	7	Lee Ju-ho	South Korea	1:57.68	
7	2	Matteo Restivo	Italy	1:58.12	
8	1	Danas Rapšys	Lithuania	1:58.29	

=== Final ===
The final was held on 26 July at 21:00.

Rank	Lane	Name	Nationality	Time	Notes
1st place, gold medalist(s)	4	Evgeny Rylov	Russia	1:53.40	
2nd place, silver medalist(s)	5	Ryan Murphy	United States	1:54.12	
3rd place, bronze medalist(s)	3	Luke Greenbank	Great Britain	1:55.85	
4	1	Radosław Kawęcki	Poland	1:56.37	
5	8	Ryosuke Irie	Japan	1:56.52	
6	6	Jacob Pebley	United States	1:56.72	
7	7	Ádám Telegdy	Hungary	1:56.86	
8	2	Markus Thormeyer	Canada	1:58.50	
