= Evgeny Rylov =

Russian swimmer (born 1996)

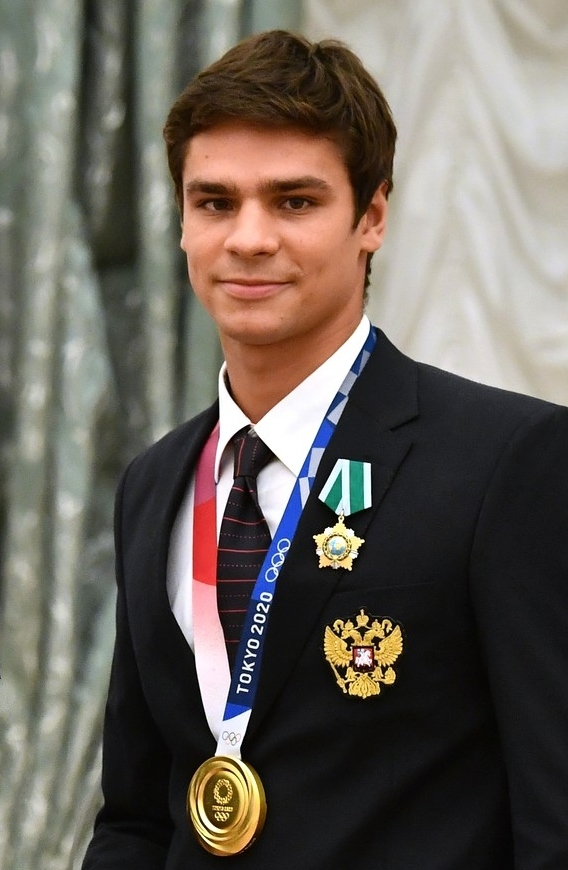
- Rylov in 2021

Personal information
- Full name: Evgeny Mikhailovich Rylov
- National team: Russia
- Born: 23 September 1996 (age 30) Novotroitsk, Russia
- Height: 1.85 m (6 ft 1 in)
- Weight: 78 kg (172 lb)

Sport
- Sport: Swimming
- Strokes: Backstroke, freestyle swimming
- Club: Energy Standard International Swim Club (former)
- Coach: Andrey Shishin
Medal record
Event	1st	2nd	3rd
Olympic Games	2	1	1
World Championships (LC)	2	3	3
World Championships (SC)	3	2	2
European Championships (LC)	4	3	1
European Championships (SC)	0	0	1
Total	11	9	8
Representing (Russia) ROC
Olympic Games
Gold medal – first place	2020 Tokyo	100 m backstroke
Gold medal – first place	2020 Tokyo	200 m backstroke
Silver medal – second place	2020 Tokyo	4×200 m freestyle
Representing Russia
Olympic Games
Bronze medal – third place	2016 Rio de Janeiro	200 m backstroke
World Championships (LC)
Gold medal – first place	2017 Budapest	200 m backstroke
Gold medal – first place	2019 Gwangju	200 m backstroke
Silver medal – second place	2019 Gwangju	50 m backstroke
Silver medal – second place	2019 Gwangju	100 m backstroke
Silver medal – second place	2019 Gwangju	4×100 m freestyle
Bronze medal – third place	2015 Kazan	200 m backstroke
Bronze medal – third place	2017 Budapest	4×100 m medley
Bronze medal – third place	2019 Gwangju	4×100 m medley
World Championships (SC)
Gold medal – first place	2018 Hangzhou	50 m backstroke
Gold medal – first place	2018 Hangzhou	200 m backstroke
Gold medal – first place	2018 Hangzhou	4×50 m medley
Silver medal – second place	2018 Hangzhou	4×50 m freestyle
Silver medal – second place	2018 Hangzhou	4×100 m freestyle
Bronze medal – third place	2018 Hangzhou	4×50 m mixed freestyle
Bronze medal – third place	2018 Hangzhou	4×50 m mixed medley
European Championships (LC)
Gold medal – first place	2018 Glasgow	200 m backstroke
Gold medal – first place	2018 Glasgow	4×100 m freestyle
Gold medal – first place	2020 Budapest	200 m backstroke
Gold medal – first place	2020 Budapest	4×100 m freestyle
Silver medal – second place	2018 Glasgow	100 m backstroke
Silver medal – second place	2018 Glasgow	4×100 m medley
Silver medal – second place	2020 Budapest	4×100 m medley
Bronze medal – third place	2020 Budapest	4×200 m mixed freestyle
European Championships (SC)
Bronze medal – third place	2021 Kazan	4×50 m freestyle
Summer Youth Olympics
Gold medal – first place	2014 Nanjing	50 m backstroke
Gold medal – first place	2014 Nanjing	100 m backstroke
Gold medal – first place	2014 Nanjing	4×100 m medley
Silver medal – second place	2014 Nanjing	200 m backstroke

Evgeny Mikhailovich Rylov (Russian: Евгений Михайлович Рылов, IPA: [jɪvˈɡʲenʲɪj ˈrɨləf]; born 23 September 1996) is a retired Russian competitive swimmer and Olympic champion specializing in backstroke events. He won three gold medals at the 2014 Summer Youth Olympics in Nanjing, and a bronze medal at his senior international debut at the 2015 World Championships in Kazan. He also won a bronze medal at the 2016 Summer Olympics in Rio de Janeiro and a gold medal at the 2017 World Championships in Budapest, both were in the 200 metre backstroke event. In 2018, at the 2018 World Short Course Championships, he won gold medals in the 200 metre backstroke and 50 metre backstroke. At the 2019 World Championships, he won a gold medal in the 200 metre backstroke, silver medal in the 100 metre backstroke, and silver medal in the 50 metre backstroke. He won the gold medal in the 100 metre backstroke and 200 metre backstroke at the 2020 Summer Olympics in Tokyo.

== Background ==
Rylov's father Mikhail Rylov is a former footballer, who now serves as a coach. In childhood he tried playing association football, but chose instead swimming. He is a staff police sergeant of the Moscow Oblast Police of the town district of Lobnya. He competes for the Moscow Oblast region in Russian competitions.

== Career ==
=== 2014 Summer Youth Olympics ===
Rylov first established himself on the world scene at the 2014 Summer Youth Olympics in Nanjing, China, where he achieved a total of four medals, three golds and one silver, and broke two world junior records. In the 100 metre backstroke, Rylov shared the top prize with Italy's Simone Sabbioni in a matching time of 54.24 seconds. On 20 August, he put up a sterling effort of 25.09 seconds to crush the world junior record and pick up his second gold of the meet in the 50 metre backstroke, touching out Greece's Apostolos Christou by 0.35 of a second. Less than an hour later, Rylov and his teammates Anton Chupkov, Aleksandr Sadovnikov, and Filipp Shopin led throughout the race to capture the 4×100 metre medley relay title in a world junior record-breaking time of 3:38.02. On the final night of the Games, Rylov added a silver to his medal tally, this time in the 200 metre backstroke with a time of 1:57.08, losing the title and his chance of breaking another record to China's Li Guangyuan by 14-hundredths of a second. Additionally, he helped achieve a fourth-place finish in the 4×100 metre mixed freestyle relay on the first day of competition in 3:32.15 and a fourth-place finish on the third day of competition in the 4×100 metre freestyle relay in 3:25.01.

=== 2015 World Championships ===
2015 World Long Course Championships
Bronze medal – third place	200 m backstroke	1:54.60 (NR)

When Russia hosted the 2015 World Aquatics Championships in Kazan, Rylov charged his way to round out the podium with a third-place and Russian record time of 1:54.60 in the 200 metre backstroke. Earlier in the Championships, he posted a time of 53.23 seconds to place seventh in the final of the 100 metre backstroke, finishing 0.57 seconds behind the bronze medalist in the event Matt Grevers of the United States. He also placed fifth in the 4×100 metre medley relay, contributing a split of 53.21 seconds for the backstroke leg to help achieve a finals relay time of 3:30.90.

=== 2016 Summer Olympics ===
2016 Summer Olympics
Bronze medal – third place	200 m backstroke	1:53.97 (ER)

At the Russian Championships in April 2016, Rylov broke the European record in the 200 metre backstroke with a time of 1:54.21. Approximately four months later, at the 2016 Summer Olympics in Rio de Janeiro, Brazil, he broke the European record again with a time of 1:53.97 and won the bronze medal in the 200 metre backstroke. In the 100 metre backstroke, he placed sixth in the final with a time of 52.74 seconds. For the 4×100 metre medley relay, he split a 52.90 for the backstroke leg of the relay to help achieve a fourth-place finish in 3:31.30 with finals relay teammates Anton Chupkov (breaststroke), Aleksandr Sadovnikov (butterfly), and Vladimir Morozov (freestyle).

=== 2017 ===
At 2017 Russian Championships in April, he lowered his own 200 metre backstroke European record for the third time with a time of 1:53.81 before tying the Russian record in the 50 metre backstroke with a time of 24.52 seconds less than one hour later.

==== 2017 World Championships ====
2017 World Long Course Championships
Gold medal – first place	200 m backstroke	1:53.61 (ER)
Bronze medal – third place	4×100 m medley	3:29.76 (NR)

At the World Aquatics Championships, held in July 2017 at Danube Arena in Budapest, Hungary, Rylov broke his own European record once again in the 200 metre backstroke with a time of 1:53.61, winning the gold medal and defeating the silver medalist in the event, and 2016 Olympic champion in the event, Ryan Murphy of the United States by 0.60 seconds in the process. This was the first long course world championships gold medal won by a Russian male swimmer in an individual event since 2003. For the 4×100 metre medley relay on the final day of swimming competition, he split a 52.89 for the backstroke leg of the relay in the final to contribute to a bronze medal-win in a Russian record time of 3:29.76 with finals relay teammates Kirill Prigoda (breaststroke), Aleksandr Popkov (butterfly), and Vladimir Morozov (freestyle).

=== 2018 ===
==== 2018 European Championships ====
At the 2018 European Aquatics Championships in Glasgow, Scotland in August, Rylov won the gold medal in the 200 metre backstroke with a European record and Championships record time of 1:53.36. He won his first gold medal of the Championships five days earlier in the 4×100 metre freestyle relay, leading-off the relay in 48.62 seconds to help finish first in 3:12.23. For the 100 metre backstroke, he won the silver medal with a time of 52.74 seconds in the final, finishing 0.21 seconds behind gold medalist in the event Kliment Kolesnikov, also of Russia. In the 4×100 metre medley relay, he swam a 52.66 for the backstroke portion of the relay in the preliminary heats before being substituted out for Kliment Kolesnikov in the final and winning a silver medal for his efforts when the finals relay finished second in 3:32.03.

==== 2018 World Short Course Championships ====
2018 World Short Course Championships
Gold medal – first place	50 m backstroke	22.58 (NR)
Gold medal – first place	4×50 m medley	1:30.54
Gold medal – first place	200 m backstroke	1:47.02
Silver medal – second place	4×100 m freestyle	3:03.11 (h)
Silver medal – second place	4×50 m freestyle	1:22.22 (NR)
Bronze medal – third place	4×50 m mixed freestyle	1:28.73 (h)
Bronze medal – third place	4×50 m mixed medley	1:37.33 (h)

On the first day of competition at the 2018 World Short Course Swimming Championships in Hangzhou, China in December, Rylov won a silver medal in the 4×100 metre freestyle relay, swimming a 46.09 for the lead-off leg of the relay in the prelims heats before being substituted out for Vladislav Grinev in the final, where the finals relay placed second with a 3:03.11. The second day, he won a bronze medal as part of the 4×50 metre mixed freestyle relay, contributing a lead-off split time of 21.21 seconds in the prelims heats to help qualify the relay to the final ranking second, where it went on to finish in third-place with a 1:28.73. In the 4×50 metre mixed medley relay the following day, he swam a 23.18 for the backstroke leg of the relay in the prelims heats, was substituted out and Kliment Kolesnikov substituted in for the finals relay, and won a bronze medal when the finals relay placed third in 1:37.33.

Day four of competition, Rylov anchored the 4×50 metre freestyle relay in the final to help achieve a silver medal victory in a new Russian record time of 1:22.22, splitting a time of 20.37 seconds, which was the third-fastest split time in the final heat behind Ryan Held of the United States, who split a 20.25, and Chad le Clos of South Africa, who split a 20.31. Later in the same session, he won the gold medal in the 50 metre backstroke with a Russian record time of 22.58 seconds. His time moved him up in rankings to the second-fastest performer in the event all-time, only behind world record holder Florent Manaudou. In the final of the 4×50 metre medley relay the following day, he swam the fastest freestyle leg in the field with a time of 20.22 seconds, helping win the gold medal with a finals relay time of 1:30.54. On the sixth and final day, he won the gold medal in the 200 metre backstroke with a time of 1:47.02, finishing 0.32 seconds ahead of the silver medalist, Ryan Murphy, and 1.23 seconds ahead of the bronze medalists, Radosław Kawęcki and Mitch Larkin.

=== 2019 ===
==== 2019 World Championships ====
2019 World Long Course Championships
Gold medal – first place	200 m backstroke	1:53.40
Silver medal – second place	4×100 m freestyle	3:09.97
Silver medal – second place	100 m backstroke	52.67
Silver medal – second place	50 m backstroke	24.49
Bronze medal – third place	4×100 m medley	3:28.81 (NR)

At the World Aquatics Championships in Gwangju, South Korea in July 2019, he defended the World Championships title in the 200 metre backstroke. He also won silver medals in the 50 metre backstroke, finishing 0.06 seconds behind gold medalist Zane Waddell of South Africa with a 24.49, and the 100 metre backstroke, where he swam a 52.67 to finish 24-hundredths of a second behind gold medalist Xu Jiayu of China. With his three individual medals, he became the first male swimmer to win a medal in all three backstroke distances at a single World Aquatics Championships. In the final of the 4×100 metre freestyle relay, he swam the second-fastest split in the field with a 47.02 for the anchor leg of the relay, which was just four-hundredths of a second faster than the 47.06 swum by third-fastest Kyle Chalmers of Australia and sixteen-hundredths of a second slower than the 46.86 swum by Zach Apple of the United States, and contributed to a silver medal-winning finish in 3:09.97. For the 4×100 metre mixed medley relay, Rylov swam the backstroke leg of the relay in the final, helping achieve a fourth-place finish in a Russian record time of 3:40.78 with a split of 51.97 seconds. His time of 51.97 seconds for the lead-off leg of the relay was faster than the Russian record of 52.44 seconds he set in the semifinals of the 100 metre backstroke, however it did not count as a new record as times from mixed gender events do not count for individual gender records. As part of the 4×100 metre medley relay, he split the fastest backstroke leg in the final with a 52.57 to help win the bronze medal in a Russian record time of 3:28.81.

==== 2019 International Swimming League ====
In the Autumn of 2019, he was member of the inaugural International Swimming League swimming for the Energy Standard International Swim Club, who won the team title in Las Vegas, Nevada, in December. He won the 100 metre backstroke with and 200 metre backstroke events at both the Budapest and London matches after winning just the 100 metre backstroke in Naples.

=== 2021 ===
At the 2021 Russian Championships in April, Rylov set a new 100 metre backstroke Russian record with a time of 52.12 seconds before setting a new 200 metre backstroke European record with a time of 1:53.23 three days later.

==== 2020 European Championships ====
On the first day of swimming competition at the 2020 European Aquatics Championships, held in Budapest, Hungary in May, Rylov won a gold medal as part of the 4×100 metre freestyle relay, splitting 48.61 for the anchor leg of the relay in the prelims heats to help advance the relay to the final ranking fourth, where the finals relay finished first in a time of 3:10.41. The next day, he won a bronze medal in the 4×200 metre mixed freestyle relay again for his efforts in the prelims heats, this time swimming a time of 1:48.76 for the second leg of the prelims relay to help advance the relay to the final ranking sixth before the finals relay placed third in a time of 7:31.54. In the 100 metre backstroke on the third and fourth days of competition, Rylov was the highest ranking swimmer representing Russia, placing eighth overall with a time of 53.51 seconds in the final. On days five and six of competition, he competed in the 200 metre backstroke, ultimately winning the gold medal and European title with a time of 1:54.46 in the final, finishing less than two-tenths of a second ahead of silver medalist Luke Greenbank of Great Britain. The seventh and final day of competition, he won a silver medal for his prelims efforts on the 4×100 metre medley relay, helping advance the relay to the final ranking sixth with a backstroke split of 53.44 in the prelims heats before the finals relay finished second with a time of 3:29.50.

==== 2020 Summer Olympics ====
2020 Summer Olympics
Gold medal – first place	100 m backstroke	51.98 (ER)
Gold medal – first place	200 m backstroke	1:53.27 (OR)
Silver medal – second place	4×200 m freestyle	7:01.81

At the 2020 Summer Olympics in Tokyo, Japan, held in 2021 due to the COVID-19 pandemic, he claimed gold medals in the 100 metre backstroke and 200 metre backstroke respectively, breaking the 100 metre backstroke European record with a time of 51.98 and the 200 metre backstroke Olympic record with a time of 1:53.27. He became Russia's first indoor Olympic swimming champion in 25 years.

Rylov also won a silver medal in 4×200 metre freestyle relay together with his finals relay teammates, splitting a 1:45.26 for the third leg of the relay. In addition to events he medaled in, he helped achieve a fourth-place finish in the 4×100 metre medley relay in 3:29.22 and a seventh-place finish in the 4×100 metre mixed medley relay in 3:42.45, swimming the backstroke leg of each relay in the final.

Stoloto conducted a poll to determine the best Russian athlete of the 2020 Summer Olympics, with Evgeny Rylov placing first and winning the award.

==== 2021 International Swimming League ====
Rylov was the MVP of the 9th match in the regular season of ISL season 3 in 2021.

==== 2021 European Short Course Championships ====
In November, at the 2021 European Short Course Swimming Championships in Kazan, Rylov won a bronze medal in the 4×50 metre freestyle relay on day one, splitting a 20.99 for the third leg of the relay to contribute to the finals relay time of 1:23.35. On the second day, he placed 20th in the preliminary heats of the 50 metre freestyle with a time of 21.61 seconds. The following day, he placed fourth in the preliminary heats of the 100 metre backstroke, not advancing to the semifinals as he was not one of the two fastest swimmers representing Russia with his time of 50.55 seconds. Day five, he ranked fourth in the semifinals of the 200 metre backstroke with a time of 1:51.73 before withdrawing from competing in the final of the event on the final day of competition.

=== 2022 ===
On 18 March 2022, Rylov participated in the Moscow rally in support of the Russian invasion of Ukraine. His swimwear sponsor at the time of the rally, Speedo, terminated their endorsement deal with Rylov in response to his participation in the rally. He was also subsequently suspended from the Energy Standard International Swimming Club of the International Swimming League along with all other support staff and athletes from Russia. Later in the same week, he withdrew from competing at the 2022 World Aquatics Championships and FINA announced his participation in the rally was under investigation in regards to potentially violating FINA rules. On 20 April 2022, he received a nine-month suspension by FINA "from all competitions and activities organized or sanctioned by FINA, including any International Competition on the FINA World Aquatic Calendar". Prior to this individualized ban for his participation in the rally, he was subjected to a blanket ban on 3 March 2022 by the European governing body for aquatic sports, LEN, which banned all Russian and Belarusians athletes and officials from taking part and competing at LEN competitions until further notice. While he competed at non-FINA and non-LEN events during the year, such as the Russian Championships, his times did not count for world rankings nor world records. In April 2023, the ban on Russian and Belarusian athletes at World Aquatics (formerly FINA) events was extended indefinitely.

At the multi-country and multi-sport 2022 Russian Solidarity Games segment in November 2022, with swimming competition held in Kazan and conducted in short course metres, Rylov won the bronze medal in the 100 metre backstroke with a time of 50.03 seconds on day three of competition, 21 November. Two days later, in his first final of the day, he placed fourth in the 50 metre freestyle with a time of 21.41 seconds. Later in the same session, he won the bronze medal in the 50 metre backstroke in a time of 23.16 seconds, which was 1.05 seconds behind gold medalist Kliment Kolesnikov who swam 0.11 seconds faster than the world record in the event. On day seven of seven, he won a gold medal in the 200 metre backstroke, finishing in 1:50.32.

=== 2023 ===
2023 Russian Championships (LC)
Gold medal – first place	200 m backstroke	1:55.50
Silver medal – second place	100 m backstroke	53.21
Bronze medal – third place	50 m backstroke	24.66

Rylov entered to compete at the 2023 Russian National Championships, held in April at the Palace of Water Sports in Kazan. On day one, he ranked fourth in the semifinals of the 100 metre backstroke with a 53.69 and qualified for the final the following day. Earlier in the day, he ranked sixth in the preliminaries with a time of 54.82 seconds to qualify for the semifinals. On the second evening, he won the silver medal with a time of 53.21 seconds, which was 0.67 seconds slower than gold medalist Kliment Kolesnikov. The third morning session, he finished in 25.05 seconds in the preliminaries of the 50 metre backstroke, advancing to the semifinals ranking fourth. In the evening semifinals, he achieved a time of 24.89 seconds to qualify for the final ranking fourth. The following evening, he won the bronze medal, finishing 0.54 seconds behind the gold medalist with a 24.66.

On the morning of day six of six, Rylov ranked first in the preliminaries of the 200 metre backstroke with a time of 1:58.23 and qualified for the final. In the final, held in the evening session later the same day, he won the gold medal in the 200 metre backstroke with a time of 1:55.50.

2024 and beyond

Before the 2024 Olympic Games in Paris, Rylov flatly refused to compete under a neutral status and without a flag — although, in fact, he had not even been offered such an opportunity. In 2025, in an interview with Match TV, Rylov stated that it is better to compete under a neutral flag than not to participate in international competitions at all.

== International championships ==
=== Long course metres (50 m pool) ===
Meet	50 back	100 back	200 back	4×100 free	4×200 free	4×100 medley	4×100 mixed free	4×200 mixed free	4×100 mixed medley
Junior level
YOG 2014	1st place, gold medalist(s)	1st place, gold medalist(s)	2nd place, silver medalist(s)	4th	—N/a	1st place, gold medalist(s)	4th	—N/a	
Senior level
WC 2015		7th	3rd place, bronze medalist(s)			5th		—N/a	
OG 2016	—N/a	6th	3rd place, bronze medalist(s)			4th	—N/a	—N/a	—N/a
WC 2017			1st place, gold medalist(s)			3rd place, bronze medalist(s)		—N/a	
EC 2018		2nd place, silver medalist(s)	1st place, gold medalist(s)	1st place, gold medalist(s)		(silver) ^{[a]}			
WC 2019	2nd place, silver medalist(s)	2nd place, silver medalist(s)	1st place, gold medalist(s)	2nd place, silver medalist(s)		3rd place, bronze medalist(s)		—N/a	4th
EC 2020		8th	1st place, gold medalist(s)	(gold) ^{[a]}		(silver) ^{[a]}		(bronze) ^{[a]}	
OG 2020	—N/a	1st place, gold medalist(s)	1st place, gold medalist(s)		2nd place, silver medalist(s)	4th	—N/a	—N/a	7th

^{a} Rylov swam only in the prelims heats.

=== Short course metres (25 m pool) ===
Meet	50 free	50 back	100 back	200 back	4×50 free	4×100 free	4×50 medley	4×50 mixed free	4×50 mixed medley
WC 2018		1st place, gold medalist(s)		1st place, gold medalist(s)	2nd place, silver medalist(s)	(silver) ^{[a]}	1st place, gold medalist(s)	(bronze) ^{[a]}	(bronze) ^{[a]}
EC 2021	20th		4th (h)	4th (sf)	3rd place, bronze medalist(s)	—N/a			

^{a} Rylov swam only in the prelims heats.

== Career best times ==
=== Long course metres (50 m pool) ===
Event	Time	Meet	Date	Location	Notes	Ref
50 m backstroke	24.49	2019 World Aquatics Championships	28 July 2019	Gwangju, South Korea		
100 m backstroke	51.98	2020 Summer Olympics	27 July 2021	Tokyo, Japan	ER, NR	
200 m backstroke	1:53.23	2021 Russian Championships	8 April 2021	Kazan	ER, NR	

Legend: ER – European record; NR – Russian record; e – equalled existing record;
Records not set in finals: h – heat; sf – semifinal; r – relay 1st leg; rh – relay heat 1st leg; b – B final; † – en route to final mark; so – swim-off; tt – time trial

=== Short course metres (25 m pool) ===
Event	Time	Meet	Date	Location	Notes	Ref
50 m backstroke	22.58	2018 World Short Course Championships	14 December 2018	Hangzhou, China	Former NR	
100 m backstroke	48.88	2020 Russian Short Course Championships	15 December 2020	Saint Petersburg		
200 m backstroke	1:46.37	2020 International Swimming League	21 November 2020	Budapest, Hungary		

Legend: NR – Russian record; e – equalled existing record;
Records not set in finals: h – heat; sf – semifinal; r – relay 1st leg; rh – relay heat 1st leg; b – B final; † – en route to final mark; so – swim-off; tt – time trial

== Continental and national records ==
=== Long course metres (50 m pool) ===
No.	Event	Time		Meet	Location	Date	Type	Status	Ref
1	200 m backstroke	1:54.60		2015 World Aquatics Championships	Kazan	7 August 2015	NR	Former	
2	200 m backstroke (2)	1:54.21		2016 Russian Championships	Moscow	21 April 2016	ER, NR	Former	
3	200 m backstroke (3)	1:53.97		2016 Summer Olympics	Rio de Janeiro, Brazil	11 August 2016	ER, NR	Former	
4	200 m backstroke (4)	1:53.81		2017 Russian Championships	Moscow	13 April 2017	ER, NR	Former	
5	50 m backstroke	24.52		2017 Russian Championships	Moscow	13 April 2017	NR	Former	
6	200 m backstroke (5)	1:53.61		2017 World Aquatics Championships	Budapest, Hungary	28 July 2017	ER, NR	Former	
7	4×100 m medley	3:29.76		2017 World Aquatics Championships	Budapest, Hungary	30 July 2017	NR	Former	
8	200 m backstroke (6)	1:53.36		2018 European Aquatics Championships	Glasgow, Scotland	8 August 2018	ER, NR	Former	
9	100 m backstroke	52.44	sf	2019 World Aquatics Championships	Gwangju, South Korea	22 July 2019	NR	Former	
10	4×100 m mixed medley	3:40.78		2019 World Aquatics Championships	Gwangju, South Korea	24 July 2019	NR	Current	
11	4×100 m medley (2)	3:28.81		2019 World Aquatics Championships	Gwangju, South Korea	28 July 2019	NR	Current	
12	100 m backstroke (2)	52.12		2021 Russian Championships	Kazan	5 April 2021	NR	Former	
13	200 m backstroke (7)	1:53.23		2021 Russian Championships	Kazan	8 April 2021	ER, NR	Current	
14	100 m backstroke (3)	51.98		2020 Summer Olympics	Tokyo, Japan	27 July 2021	ER, NR	Current	

Legend: ER – European record; NR – Russian record; e – equalled existing record;
Records not set in finals: h – heat; sf – semifinal; r – relay 1st leg; rh – relay heat 1st leg; b – B final; † – en route to final mark; so – swim-off; tt – time trial

=== Short course metres (25 m pool) ===
No.	Event	Time	Meet	Location	Date	Type	Status	Ref
1	4×50 m freestyle	1:22.22	2018 World Short Course Championships	Hangzhou, China	14 December 2018	NR	Current	
2	50 m backstroke	22.58	2018 World Short Course Championships	Hangzhou, China	14 December 2018	NR	Former	

Legend: NR – Russian record; e – equalled existing record;
Records not set in finals: h – heat; sf – semifinal; r – relay 1st leg; rh – relay heat 1st leg; b – B final; † – en route to final mark; so – swim-off; tt – time trial

== See also ==
- List of multiple Olympic gold medalists at a single Games
- List of Youth Olympic Games gold medalists who won Olympic gold medals
- List of World Swimming Championships (25 m) medalists (men)
- List of European records in swimming
- Chronological summary of the 2020 Summer Olympics
- World and Olympic records set at the 2020 Summer Olympics

Records
Preceded by (France) Camille Lacourt	Men's 100 metre backstroke European record holder (long course); 27 July 2021 – 20 June 2022	Succeeded by (Italy) Thomas Ceccon
Preceded by (Poland) Radosław Kawęcki	Men's 200 metre backstroke European record holder (long course); 21 April 2016 – present	Succeeded by Incumbent
