= Markus Thormeyer =

Canadian swimmer

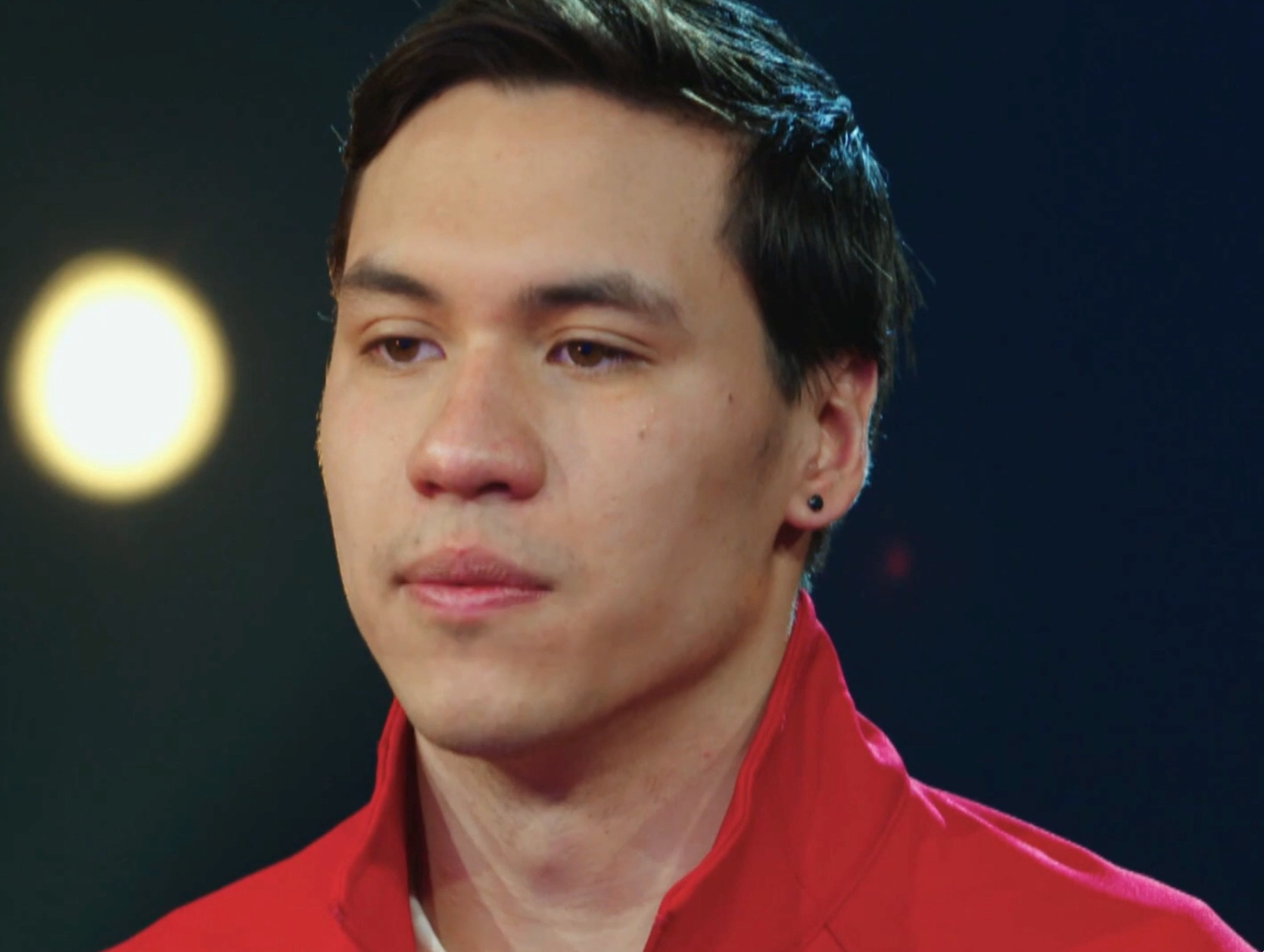
- Thormeyer in 2021

Personal information
- National team: Canada
- Born: August 25, 1997 (age 28) Newmarket, Ontario, Canada
- Height: 1.98 m (6 ft 6 in)
- Weight: 90 kg (200 lb)

Sport
- Sport: Swimming
- Strokes: Backstroke, Freestyle
- Club: High Performance Centre-Vancouver, Winskill Dolphins Swim Club
- College team: University of British Columbia
Medal record
Men's swimming
Representing Canada
World Championships (LC)
Bronze medal – third place	2017 Budapest	4x100 m mixed freestyle
World Championships (SC)
Bronze medal – third place	2016 Windsor	4x50 m mixed freestyle
Commonwealth Games
Bronze medal – third place	2018 Gold Coast	100 metre backstroke
Pan American Games
Silver medal – second place	2015 Toronto	4x100 m freestyle relay
World Junior Championships
Gold medal – first place	2015 Singapore	4×100 m mixed freestyle
Junior Pan Pacific Championships
Bronze medal – third place	2014 Maui	100 m freestyle
Bronze medal – third place	2014 Maui	100 m backstroke
Bronze medal – third place	2014 Maui	200 m backstroke
Bronze medal – third place	2014 Maui	4×100 m freestyle
Bronze medal – third place	2014 Maui	4×100 m medley

Markus Thormeyer (born August 25, 1997) is a Canadian competitive swimmer who specializes in freestyle and backstroke. Originally from Delta, Thormeyer moved in 2015 to Vancouver, British Columbia after graduating high school to train with the High Performance Centre-Vancouver. He studied environmental science at the University of British Columbia at the undergraduate level. In September 2021, he started a PhD in zoology at UBC.

== Career ==
Thormeyer began swimming at the age of 10 for the Markham Aquatic Club in Markham, Ontario but moved across the country to Delta, British Columbia shortly after he started. He continued to swim competitively under the Winskill Dolphins Swim Club through to his high school graduation.

=== 2013–2016 ===
As an age-group swimmer, Thormeyer made a name for himself on the Canadian swimming scene. At 15 he competed at the 2013 Canada Summer Games for Team British Columbia, where he earned a bronze in the men's 100m backstroke. He also represented Canada multiple times on the junior international stage, being the youngest male on Canada's team at the 2013 World Junior Swimming Championships and winning five bronze medals at the 2014 Junior Pan Pacific Swimming Championships. These accomplishments earned him the Delta Sport's Hall of Fame 2014 Youth Athlete of the Year and the Sport BC Junior Male Athlete of the Year in 2016.

It was not until 2015 when Thormeyer made his first senior international appearance at the 2015 Pan American Games where he won a silver as a part of the 4x100 m freestyle relay. Later that summer at the 2015 FINA World Junior Swimming Championships, Thormeyer went along to win gold while also setting a new world junior record with Penny Oleksiak, Taylor Ruck, and Javier Acevedo on Canada's mixed 4 × 100 m freestyle relay.

After winning a gold and two bronzes at the Canadian Olympic Trials in 2016, he was named to Canada's Olympic team for the 2016 Summer Olympics. Thormeyer swam the third leg of the men's 4 × 100 m freestyle relay which qualified for the final in fifth place, but ultimately placed seventh overall in the final. Later that year in December, Thormeyer won a bronze medal as part of Canada's 4x50m mixed freestyle event alongside Sandrine Mainville, Michelle Toro, and Yuri Kisil at the World Short Course Championships in Windsor, Ontario.

=== 2017–2021 ===
Thormeyer was also a part of the University of British Columbia varsity swim team. Winning multiple individual events and contributing as a key swimmer for the relays earned him the title of both U Sports Rookie of the Year and UBC Thunderbirds Rookie of the Year in his first year on the collegiate stage. As part of the Thunderbirds, he contributing to multiple Canada West Championship titles and U Sport Championship national titles.

In April 2017, Thormeyer was named to Canada's 2017 World Aquatics Championships team in Budapest, Hungary, where he contributed to a bronze medal for Canada in the 4 × 100 m mixed freestyle relay. He also was named to the Canada's 2017 Summer Universiade team and competed at the games that summer in TaiPei City, Taiwan.

In September 2017, Thormeyer was named to Canada's 2018 Commonwealth Games team. Thormeyer won a bronze medal in the 100 metre backstroke event. Competing backstroke for the first time on the international senior stage, he qualified for the final in second place with a significant best time. In the final however, he was edged out of silver by tenths of a second, taking the bronze.

The onset of the COVID-19 pandemic resulted in the 2020 Summer Olympics being delayed by a year, as well as causing significant disruptions in Thormeyer's training. He was out of the pool for four months in the spring and early summer of 2020. Competing in the International Swimming League in the fall provided some relief from these conditions. In June 2021, Thormeyer was named to Canada's Olympic team.

He placed nineteenth in the heats of the 100 m backstroke and did not advance, but made it to the semi-finals of the 200 m backstroke, placing sixteenth in both the heats and the semi-finals. Notably, Thormeyer was part of Canada's team in the 4 × 100 m freestyle relay, who unexpectedly finished in fourth place despite not having been favoured to make the event final.

== Personal bests ==
As of August 2021

Long course
Event	Time	Meet	Date	Note(s)
100 m freestyle	48.71	2019 U Sports Odlum Brown Swimming Championships	23 February 2019	
200 m freestyle	1:47.66	2018 Canadian Swimming Trials, Kinsmen Sports Centre, Edmonton	18 July 2018	
100 m backstroke	53.35	2019 Canadian Swimming Trials	3 April 2019	
200 m backstroke	1:56.96	2019 World Aquatics Championships	25 July 2019	

== Personal life ==
Thormeyer came out as gay in late 2019.
