= Robert Glință =

Romanian swimmer (born 1997)

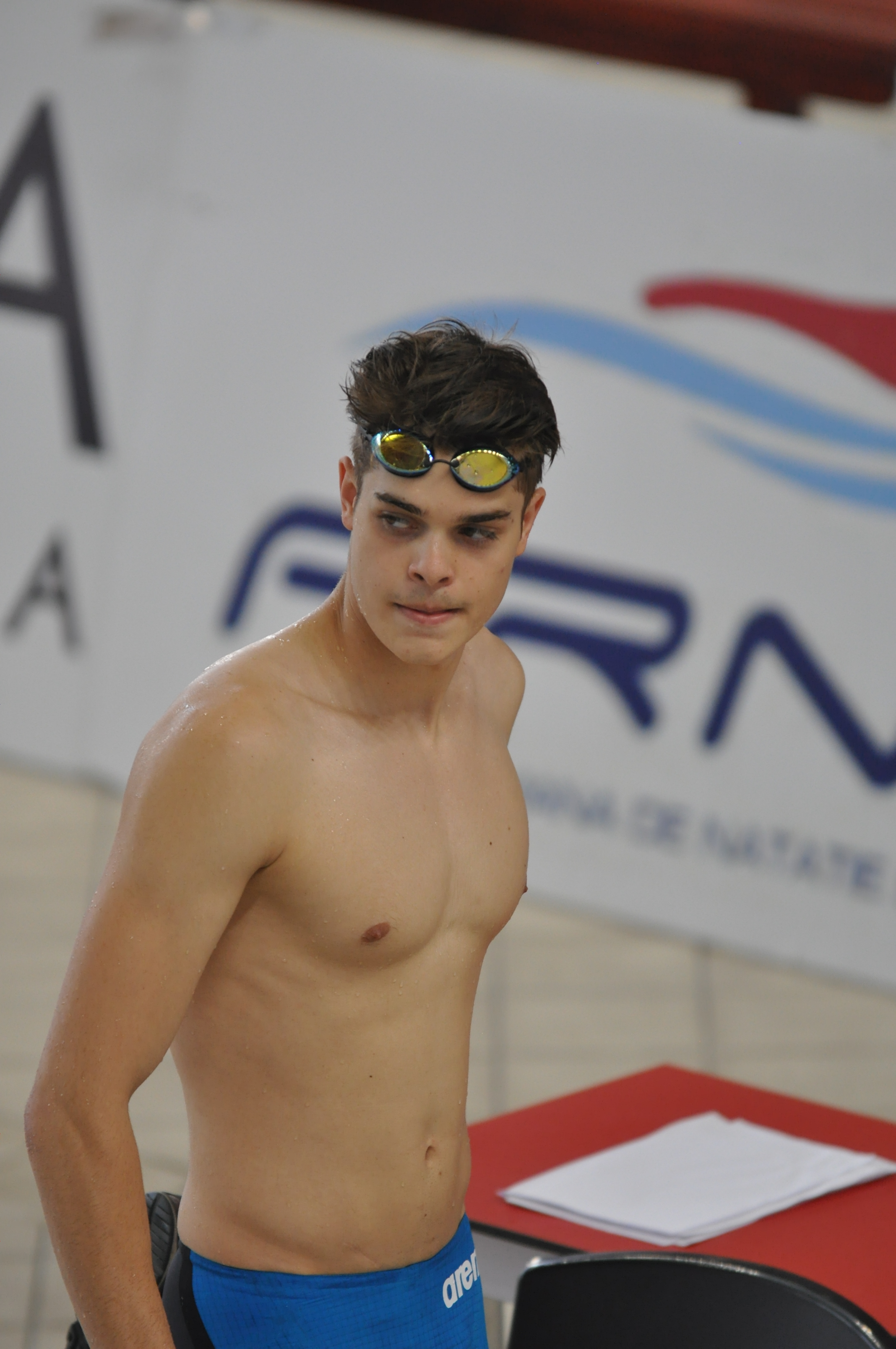
- Glință in 2015

Personal information
- Nationality: Romania
- Born: 18 April 1997 (age 29) Pitești, Romania
- Height: 1.85 m (6 ft 1 in)
- Weight: 75 kg (165 lb)

Sport
- Sport: Swimming
- Strokes: Backstroke
- Club: Dinamo București; Team Iron (2019)
Medal record
Men's swimming
Representing Romania
World Championships (SC)
Bronze medal – third place	2021 Abu Dhabi	100 m backstroke
European Championships (LC)
Gold medal – first place	2020 Budapest	100 m backstroke
Silver medal – second place	2018 Glasgow	50 m backstroke
Silver medal – second place	2020 Budapest	50 m backstroke
European Championships (SC)
Silver medal – second place	2021 Kazan	100 m backstroke
Bronze medal – third place	2017 Copenhagen	100 m backstroke
Bronze medal – third place	2019 Glasgow	100 m backstroke
Bronze medal – third place	2021 Kazan	50 m backstroke
World Junior Championships
Gold medal – first place	2015 Singapore	100 m backstroke

Robert Andrei Glință (Romanian pronunciation: [ˈrobert ˈglin.t͡sə]; born 18 April 1997) is the Romanian record holder in the long course and short course 50 metre backstroke and 100 metre backstroke. He is a former junior world record holder for 100 metre backstroke (short course), with a time of 50.77 seconds. He finalled in the 100 metre backstroke at two consecutive Summer Olympic Games, the 2016 Summer Olympic Games and the 2020 Summer Olympic Games. He represented Team Iron in the International Swimming League in 2019.

At the 2021 World Short Course Championships, held at in December Etihad Arena in Abu Dhabi, United Arab Emirates, Glință achieved his highest place finish in the 100 metre backstroke, where he won the bronze medal with a time of 49.60 seconds, which was 0.37 seconds behind gold medalist Shaine Casas of the United States. It marked his first medal at a senior short course or long course World Championships. For the edition of the World Short Course Championships the following year, the 2022 World Short Course Championships held in December in Melbourne, Australia, he placed twenty-eighth in the 100 metre backstroke with a time of 52.65 seconds.

== International championships (50 m) ==
Meet	50 freestyle	100 freestyle	50 backstroke	100 backstroke	200 backstroke	50 butterfly	4×100 freestyle	4×200 freestyle
Junior level
WJC 2013			14th	23rd	31st			
EJC 2014			17th	22nd				
YOG 2014	13th	11th	7th	5th	10th			
EG 2015	34th		4th	7th	29th		14th	13th
WJC 2015		7th	DSQ	1st place, gold medalist(s)				
Senior level
WC 2015			22nd	30th			16th	
EC 2016			7th	6th	14th		6th	
OG 2016			—N/a	8th	18th	—N/a		
EC 2018			2nd place, silver medalist(s)	4th				
WC 2019			7th	8th				
EC 2020			2nd place, silver medalist(s)	1st place, gold medalist(s)	22nd	36th		
OG 2020			—N/a	8th	26th	—N/a		
WC 2022			5th	8th				

== International championships (25 m) ==
Meet	100 freestyle	50 backstroke	100 backstroke	200 backstroke	4×50 freestyle	4×50 medley
WC 2014		31st	22nd	21st		
EC 2015		16th (h)	6th	15th	6th	16th
WC 2016		11th	7th	8th		
EC 2017		5th	3rd place, bronze medalist(s)			
WC 2018		12th	8th		11th	
EC 2019		4th	3rd place, bronze medalist(s)			
EC 2021	6th	3rd place, bronze medalist(s)	2nd place, silver medalist(s)			
WC 2021		9th	3rd place, bronze medalist(s)			
WC 2022		DNS	28th			

== Personal bests ==
=== Long course metres (50 m pool) ===
Event	Time	Meet	Location	Date	Notes
50 m backstroke	24.12	2018 European Championships	Glasgow, Scotland	3 August 2018	NR
100 m backstroke	52.88	2020 European Championships	Budapest, Hungary	20 May 2021	NR
200 m backstroke	1:57.91	2016 Summer Olympics	Rio de Janeiro, Brazil	10 August 2016	

=== Short course metres (25 m pool) ===
Event	Time	Meet	Location	Date	Notes
100 m freestyle	46.64	2021 European Championships	Kazan, Russia	6 November 2021	Former NR
50 m backstroke	22.74	2021 European Championships	Kazan, Russia	3 November 2021	NR
100 m backstroke	49.31	2021 European Championships	Kazan, Russia	5 November 2021	NR
200 m backstroke	1:51.75	2021 International Swimming League	Naples, Italy	29 September 2021	NR
