= Bryce Mefford =

American swimmer

Personal information
- Born: October 3, 1998 (age 27) Folsom, California, U.S.
- Height: 6 ft 3 in (191 cm)
- Weight: 175 lb (79 kg)

Sport
- Country: United States
- Sport: Men's swimming
- Strokes: Backstroke
- Club: Sierra Marlins Swim Team and Glen Oaks Sea Lions Swim Team
- College team: California Golden Bears

Bryce Mefford (born October 3, 1998, in Folsom, California) is an American swimmer and 2020 Summer Olympics team member for the United States. He swam for Oak Ridge High School in El Dorado Hills, California. He currently competes at the collegiate level for the University of California.

He placed second in the 200m Backstroke final of the US Olympic Team Trials in Omaha, qualifying him for the 2020 Olympic Games. He placed fourth in the 200m Backstroke Olympic final at Tokyo 2020.

Mefford represented the United States at the 2019 World University Games.
