= Luke Greenbank =

British swimmer (born 1997)

Personal information
- Born: 17 September 1997 (age 29) Crewe, England
- Height: 1.84 m (6 ft 0 in)
- Weight: 74 kg (163 lb)

Sport
- Sport: Swimming
- Strokes: Backstroke, medley
- Club: Cockermouth Swimming Club
- Coach: Sean Balmer; Eleanor Walsh
Medal record
Men's swimming
Representing Great Britain
Olympic Games
Silver medal – second place	2020 Tokyo	4×100 m medley
Bronze medal – third place	2020 Tokyo	200 m backstroke
World Championships (LC)
Gold medal – first place	2019 Gwangju	4×100 m medley
Silver medal – second place	2022 Budapest	200 m backstroke
Bronze medal – third place	2019 Gwangju	200 m backstroke
Bronze medal – third place	2022 Budapest	4×100 m medley
European Championship (LC)
Gold medal – first place	2020 Budapest	4×100 m medley
Silver medal – second place	2020 Budapest	200 m backstroke
Bronze medal – third place	2022 Rome	200 m backstroke
European Championships (SC)
Silver medal – second place	2023 Otopeni	200 m backstroke
Bronze medal – third place	2019 Glasgow	200 m backstroke
European Games
Gold medal – first place	2015 Baku	100 m backstroke
Gold medal – first place	2015 Baku	200 m backstroke
Silver medal – second place	2015 Baku	4×100 m medley
Silver medal – second place	2015 Baku	4×100 m mixed medley
Summer Youth Olympics
Gold medal – first place	2014 Nanjing	4×100 m freestyle
Bronze medal – third place	2014 Nanjing	200 m backstroke
World Junior Championships
Bronze medal – third place	2015 Singapore	100 m backstroke
European Junior Championships
Gold medal – first place	2014 Dordrecht	200 m backstroke
Representing England
Commonwealth Games
Gold medal – first place	2022 Birmingham	4×100 m medley
Silver medal – second place	2018 Gold Coast	4×100 m medley
Bronze medal – third place	2026 Glasgow	200 m backstroke

Luke Greenbank (born 17 September 1997) is an English professional swimmer who specialises in backstroke. A medalist in the 200 metre backstroke at the Olympic Games and the World and European championships, he also swam the first leg in the 2019 World and 2020 European Championship gold medal-winning Great Britain medley relay teams. He won a silver medal as lead-off for Great Britain in the 4 x 100 metre medley relay for men at the 2020 Summer Olympics. He won a gold medal as lead-off for England in the heats of the 4 x 100 metre medley relay for men at the 2022 Commonwealth Games.

Greenbank has won gold medals as part of the 4 × 100 m Men's Medley Relay at the European, World Championships and Commonwealth Games. He won two gold medals in (200 m, 100 m backstroke) and breaking a new Junior World record in 200 m backstroke at the 2015 European Games, which doubled that year as the European Junior Swimming Championships. Greenbank has the unusual distinction of having won medals at the Commonwealth Games, European Championships, World Championships, European Games and Olympic Games, as well as a full set of junior medals (Youth Olympics, World Juniors and European Juniors).

== Career ==
In 2014, at the 2014 European Junior Championships, Greenbank won gold medal in 200 m backstroke. He then competed at the 2014 Youth Olympics in Nanjing taking bronze in 200 m backstroke and gold in 4 × 100 m freestyle (with Duncan Scott, Miles Munro, Martyn Walton).

In June 2015, Greenbank competed at the inaugural 2015 European Games in Baku, He won 2 gold medals in (200 m, 100 m backstroke) and breaking a new Junior World record in 200 m backstroke at the 2015 European Games clocking in 1:56.89. He also took silver medals in 4 × 100 m medley (with Duncan Scott, Charlie Attwood, Charlie Attwood) and in 4 × 100 m mixed medley.

On August 25–30, Greenbank won bronze in men's 100 backstroke at the 2015 World Junior Championships held in Singapore.

=== 2018–2019 ===
At the 2018 Commonwealth Games held at the Gold Coast, Australia, Greenbank won a silver in the 4 × 100 m medley with Adam Peaty, James Guy and Ben Proud.

Greenbank won his first World Championships medal at the 2019 World Aquatics Championships held in Gwangju, South Korea. He finished third in the men's 200m backstroke, setting a personal best time. He was part of the team in the men's 4 × 100 metre medley relay together with Adam Peaty, James Guy and Duncan Scott. He started the race in the backstroke leg, and the team finished in a European record time of three minutes, 28.10 seconds to beat the United States, and won their first gold medal in the event in the World Championships.

Greenbank was one of the 2019 individual world championship medal-winners who were pre-selected for the postponed 2020 Tokyo Olympics.

=== 2020 ===
At the 2020 European Championships held in Budapest in May 2021, Greenbank won a silver in 200 metre backstroke, as well as a gold in the men's 4 × 100 m medley relay with Peaty, Guy and Scott.

=== 2022 ===
In June 2022, at the 2022 World Aquatics Championships, he won the silver medal in the 200 metre backstroke with a time of 1:55.16, finishing less than seven-tenths of a second behind gold medalist Ryan Murphy of the United States and less than two-tenths of a second ahead of bronze medalist Shaine Casas of the United States. He also won a bronze medal in the 4×100 metre medley relay, splitting a 53.81 to contribute to the final time of 3:31.31.

Commonwealth The first day of swimming competition at the 2022 Commonwealth Games, Greenbank qualified for the semifinals of the 100 metre backstroke, ranking fourth in the preliminaries with a time of 54.55 seconds. In the semifinals later in the day, he swam a 54.23 to qualify for the final ranking fifth. On day two, he placed fifth in the final with a time of 54.29 seconds, finishing 0.51 seconds behind gold medalist Pieter Coetze of South Africa. Three days later, he ranked as the overall fastest swimmer in the preliminaries of the 200 metre backstroke with a time of 1:56.33 and qualified for the final. He placed fifth in the final with a time of 1:56.98. On day six of six, he swam the backstroke leg of the 4×100 metre medley relay in 54.28 seconds in the preliminaries, helping qualify the relay to the final ranking second in 3:35.88. In the final, Brodie Williams substituted in for him and he won a gold medal for his efforts in the prelims when the finals relay placed first in 3:31.80.

European Championships A little over one week later, at the 2022 European Aquatics Championships held in Rome, Greenbank ranked fourth in the prelims heats of the 200 metre backstroke with a time of 1:57.81 and qualified for the evening semifinals. He swam a 1:57.07 in the semifinals, qualifying for the final ranking third. In the final, he won the bronze medal with a time of 1:56.15, finishing 0.53 seconds behind gold medalist Yohann Ndoye-Brouard of France. Five days later, on the final day of swimming competition, he helped placed fourth in the 4×100 metre medley relay, splitting a 54.28 for the backstroke leg of the relay to contribute to the final time of 3:33.60 and finishing 0.32 seconds behind the team from Austria that won the bronze medal.

=== 2024 ===
After finishing second behind Oliver Morgan in the 200 metres backstroke at the 2024 Aquatics GB Swimming Championships, Greenbank recorded a time that met the British Consideration criteria for a place at the 2024 Summer Olympics. He was subsequently named in the British team for the Olympics. Luke Greenbank competed at the 2024 Summer Olympics. In the Olympics, although he placed first in his heat in the 200 metre backstroke, he was disqualified due to staying underwater past the 15 metre mark.

=== 2025 ===
Greenbank finished second again behind Oliver Morgan in the 200 metres backstroke at the 2025 Aquatics GB Swimming Championships and earned selection for the 2025 World Aquatics Championships in Singapore. Subsequently, at the World Championships, he reached the final of the 200 metres backstroke.
