= Nicolás García (swimmer) =

Spanish swimmer (born 2002)

Personal information
- Full name: Nicolás García Saiz
- Nationality: Spanish
- Born: 18 June 2002 (age 24) Madrid, Spain
- Height: 1.93 m (6 ft 4 in)

Sport
- Sport: Swimming
- Strokes: Backstroke
- Club: CN Gredos San Diego
- College team: Virginia Tech Hokies

Nicolás García Saiz (born 18 June 2002) is a Spanish swimmer. He competed in the men's 200 metre backstroke event at the 2020 Olympics.

He also competed in the men's 50 metre backstroke, men's 100 metre backstroke, mixed 4 × 100 metre medley relay and men's 200 metre backstroke events at the 2020 European Aquatics Championships, in Budapest, Hungary.

== Biography ==
He was part of CN Gredos San Diego in Madrid, Spain, until his commitment to Virginia Tech was made official in October 2021.
