= Benedek Kovács =

Hungarian swimmer (born 1998)

Personal information
- Full name: Benedek Bendegúz Kovács
- Nationality: Hungary
- Born: 18 May 1998 (age 28) Budapest, Hungary

Sport
- Sport: Swimming
Medal record
Men's swimming
Representing Hungary
European Championships (LC)
Silver medal – second place	2022 Rome	200 m backstroke

Benedek Bendegúz Kovács (born 18 May 1998) is a Hungarian swimmer. He competed in the 2020 Summer Olympics.
