= Yohann Ndoye-Brouard =

French swimmer (born 2000)

Personal information
- Full name: Yohann Ismaël Dominique Ndoye-Brouard
- Nationality: French
- Born: 29 November 2000 (age 25) Chambéry, France
- Height: 1.97 m (6 ft 6 in)
- Weight: 90 kg (198 lb)

Sport
- Sport: Swimming
- Strokes: Backstroke
Medal record
Men's swimming
Representing France
Olympic Games
Bronze medal – third place	2024 Paris	4×100 m medley
World Championships (LC)
Silver medal – second place	2025 Singapore	4×100 m medley
Bronze medal – third place	2025 Singapore	100 m backstroke
Bronze medal – third place	2025 Singapore	200 m backstroke
European Championships (LC)
Gold medal – first place	2022 Rome	200 m backstroke
Silver medal – second place	2022 Rome	4×100 m medley
Bronze medal – third place	2022 Rome	100 m backstroke
Bronze medal – third place	2020 Budapest	100 m backstroke
Bronze medal – third place	2026 Paris	4×100 m medley
European Championships (SC)
Silver medal – second place	2023 Otopeni	100 m backstroke
Silver medal – second place	2025 Lublin	4×50 m medley
Universiade
Silver medal – second place	2019 Naples	100 m backstroke

Yohann Ismaël Dominique Ndoye-Brouard (born 29 November 2000) is a French swimmer. He competed in the men's 100 metre backstroke event at the 2020 European Aquatics Championships, in Budapest, Hungary, winning the bronze medal.

== Early life ==
Ndoye-Brouard was born in Chambéry to a French father and a mother of Senegalese descent.

== Career ==
Ndoye-Brouard competed at the 2020 Olympics in Tokyo. In the semifinals of the 100 m backstroke, he crashed into the wall at the 50 m mark. When he tried to correct his turn, he inadvertently flipped onto his stomach and was subsequently disqualified. He claimed to have not seen the flags.

At the 2022 European Championships in Rome, Ndoye-Brouard won the gold medal in the 200 m backstroke in a French record time of 1:55.62.

Ndoye-Brouard competed at the 2023 World Championships in Fukuoka. He finished fifth in the 100 m backstroke in a time of 52.84. He swam the backstroke leg of the men's 4 × 100 m medley relay, splitting 53.21. France finished fourth in a time of 3:29.88.

Ndoye-Brouard competed at the 2024 Olympics in Paris. He swam the backstroke leg of the men's 4 × 100 m medley relay and split 52.60. France won the bronze medal in a time 3:28.38, breaking the national record of 3:29.73 from 2009.

Ndoye-Brouard competed at the 2025 World Championships in Singapore. He won the bronze medal in the 100 m backstroke in a time of 51.92, breaking the French record of 52.11 set by Camille Lacourt in 2010. He then swam the 200 m backstroke, recording a time of 1:54.47 in the semifinals. This broke Mewen Tomac's French record of 1:55.38 from 2024. In the final, Ndoye-Brouard won the bronze medal in a time of 1:54.62. His final event was the men's 4 × 100 m medley relay. He split 52.26 on the backstroke leg, helping France win the silver medal in a time of 3:27.96.
