= Hugo González (swimmer) =

Spanish swimmer (born 1999)

Personal information
- Nationality: Spanish
- Born: 19 February 1999 (age 27) Palma de Mallorca, Spain
- Height: 1.92 m (6 ft 4 in)
- Weight: 82 kg (181 lb)

Sport
- Sport: Swimming
- Strokes: Backstroke, Individual Medley, Breaststroke
- Club: Real Canoe NC
- College team: Auburn University; University of California, Berkeley
Medal record
Representing Spain
World Championships (LC)
Gold medal – first place	2024 Doha	200 m backstroke
Silver medal – second place	2024 Doha	100 m backstroke
European Championships (LC)
Gold medal – first place	2020 Budapest	200 m medley
Silver medal – second place	2020 Budapest	100 m backstroke
Silver medal – second place	2026 Paris	200 m medley
Bronze medal – third place	2020 Budapest	50 m backstroke
European Championships (SC)
Gold medal – first place	2025 Lublin	200 m individual medley
Bronze medal – third place	2025 Lublin	4×50 m medley
Mediterranean Games
Silver medal – second place	2018 Tarragona	200 m medley
Silver medal – second place	2018 Tarragona	200 m backstroke
Bronze medal – third place	2018 Tarragona	4x200 m freestyle
European Youth Olympic Festival
Gold medal – first place	2015 Tbilisi	100 m backstroke
Silver medal – second place	2015 Tbilisi	200 m medley
Silver medal – second place	2015 Tbilisi	400 m medley
Silver medal – second place	2015 Tbilisi	4x100 m medley

Hugo González de Oliveira (born 19 February 1999) is a Spanish swimmer. He is the son of a Spanish father and a Brazilian mother. He competed in the men's 100 metre backstroke and the men's 200 backstroke events at the 2016 Olympics, and in the men's 100 metre backstroke event at the 2020 Summer Olympics.

He also competed at the 2016 European Junior Championships in Hodmezovasarhely winning 2 gold medals in 200 back 1:57.00 and 400IM 4:17.27

Hugo competed at the 2017 World Championships in Budapest for Spain. He took 23rd in the 100 back in 55.05, 26th in the 200 IM in 2:02.78 and 32nd in the 200 back in 2:02.41. He won 3 gold medals and a silver medal at the 2017 World Junior Championships. Gold in 400IM with a championship record 4:14.65, 200 back 1:56.69 with also a championship record and 100 back 54.27, and silver in 50 back 25.30.

Hugo swam in the finals of the men's 200 yard breaststroke at the 2021 NCAA Championships. He took 3rd in the Finals in 1:51.20.
