= Brodie Williams =

British swimmer

Brodie Paul Williams
Personal information
- Nationality: British
- Born: 18 March 1999 (age 27) Taunton, Somerset, England
- Height: 190 cm (6 ft 3 in)
- Weight: 83 kg (183 lb)

Sport
- Sport: Swimming
- Strokes: Backstroke, individual medley
Medal record
Representing Great Britain
European Championships (LC)
Gold medal – first place	2018 Glasgow	4×100 m medley
Representing England
Commonwealth Games
Gold medal – first place	2022 Birmingham	200 m backstroke
Gold medal – first place	2022 Birmingham	4×100 m medley
Silver medal – second place	2022 Birmingham	100 m backstroke

Brodie Paul Williams (born 18 March 1999) is a British swimmer.

== Career ==
Williams attended Millfield School. He competed in the 4 × 100 m medley relay event at the 2018 European Aquatics Championships, winning the gold medal.

Swam for Great Britain at the Tokyo Olympic games 2020 in both the 200M Backstroke and 400IM.

In 2022 Brodie won the Commonwealth Games in front of Home fans in the 200m Backstroke, adding to his silver he achieved earlier in the week in the 100m. He was part of the team that won the gold medal in the Men's 4 × 100 metre medley relay at the 2022 Commonwealth Games in Birmingham.
