= Kaloyan Levterov =

Bulgarian swimmer

Personal information
- Nationality: Bulgarian
- Born: 8 February 2003 (age 23)
- Height: 1.84 m (6 ft 0 in)

Sport
- Sport: Swimming

Kaloyan Levterov (born 8 February 2003) is a Bulgarian swimmer. He competed in the men's 100 metre backstroke at the 2020 Summer Olympics.
