= Mewen Tomac =

French swimmer (born 2001)

Personal information
- Nationality: French
- Born: 11 September 2001 (age 25) Évreux, France
- Height: 1.79 m (5 ft 10 in)
- Weight: 73 kg (161 lb)

Sport
- Sport: Swimming
- Strokes: Backstroke
Medal record
Men's swimming
Representing France
World Championships (SC)
Bronze medal – third place	2024 Budapest	200 m backstroke
European Championships (LC)
Silver medal – second place	2022 Rome	4×100 m medley
Bronze medal – third place	2022 Rome	4×200 m freestyle
Bronze medal – third place	2026 Paris	4×100 m medley
European Championships (SC)
Gold medal – first place	2023 Otopeni	50 m backstroke
Gold medal – first place	2023 Otopeni	100 m backstroke
Silver medal – second place	2023 Otopeni	4×50 m mixed medley
Silver medal – second place	2025 Lublin	100 m backstroke
Silver medal – second place	2025 Lublin	200 m backstroke
Silver medal – second place	2025 Lublin	4×50 m medley
Bronze medal – third place	2023 Otopeni	200 m backstroke
World Junior Championships
Bronze medal – third place	2019 Budapest	200 m backstroke
European Junior Championships
Silver medal – second place	2019 Kazan	200 m backstroke
European Youth Olympic Festival
Bronze medal – third place	2017 Győr	200 m backstroke

Mewen Tomac (born 11 September 2001) is a French swimmer. He competed in the men's 100 and 200 metre backstroke event at the 2020 European Aquatics Championships, in Budapest, Hungary and in the 2020 Tokyo Summer Olympic Games.
