= Francisco Santos (swimmer, born 1998) =

Portuguese swimmer

Personal information
- Full name: Francisco Rogério Santos
- Nationality: Portuguese
- Born: 5 September 1998 (age 27) Benedita, Portugal
- Height: 1.83 m (6 ft 0 in)
- Weight: 70 kg (154 lb)

Sport
- Sport: Swimming

Francisco Rogério Santos (born 5 September 1998) is a Portuguese swimmer. He competed in the men's 100 metre backstroke at the 2020 Summer Olympics.
