= Jan Čejka =

Czech swimmer

Personal information
- Nationality: Czech
- Born: 29 May 2001 (age 25) Pardubice, Czech Republic

Sport
- Sport: Swimming
Medal record
Representing Czech Republic
European Championships (SC)
Bronze medal – third place	2025 Lublin	200 m backstroke
European Youth Olympic Festival
Bronze medal – third place	2017 Győr	100 m backstroke

Jan Čejka (born 29 May 2001) is a Czech swimmer. He competed in the men's 100 metre backstroke at the 2020 Summer Olympics.
