= 2022 FINA World Swimming Championships (25 m) – Men's 400 metre individual medley =

Swimming competition

Men's 400 metre individual medley at the 2022 FINA World Swimming Championships (25 m)
- Venue: Melbourne Sports and Aquatic Centre
- Location: Melbourne, Australia
- Dates: 17 December (heats and final)
- Competitors: 22 from 18 nations
- Winning time: 3:55.75

Medalists
gold medal	Daiya Seto	Japan
silver medal	Carson Foster	United States
bronze medal	Matthew Sates	South Africa

The Men's 400 metre individual medley competition of the 2022 FINA World Swimming Championships (25 m) was held on 17 December 2022.

== Records ==
Prior to the competition, the existing world and championship records were as follows.

World record	Daiya Seto (JPN)	3:54.81	Las Vegas, United States	20 December 2019
Competition record	Ryan Lochte (USA)	3:55.50	Dubai, United Arab Emirates	16 December 2010

== Results ==
=== Heats ===
The heats were started at 11:47.

Rank	Heat	Lane	Name	Nationality	Time	Notes
1	3	4	Daiya Seto	Japan	4:00.35	Q
2	2	4	Carson Foster	United States	4:01.34	Q
3	3	6	Matthew Sates	South Africa	4:02.18	Q
4	1	4	Jake Foster	United States	4:02.64	Q
5	3	3	David Schlicht	Australia	4:02.85	Q
6	2	3	So Ogata	Japan	4:03.29	Q
7	2	5	Alberto Razzetti	Italy	4:04.32	Q
8	3	8	Richard Nagy	Slovakia	4:06.26	Q
9	3	7	Finlay Knox	Canada	4:07.12	
10	3	1	Émilien Mattenet	France	4:08.06	
11	2	7	Thomas Jansen	Netherlands	4:08.29	
12	1	2	Wang Hsing-hao	Chinese Taipei	4:09.74	NR
13	2	8	Luan Grobbelaar	New Zealand	4:09.98	
14	2	1	Jakub Bursa	Czech Republic	4:10.28	
15	1	5	Erick Gordillo	Guatemala	4:10.97	NR
16	2	6	Andreas Vazaios	Greece	4:11.39	
17	2	2	Huang Zhiwei	China	4:13.19	
18	1	7	Matheo Mateos	Paraguay	4:14.73	NR
19	1	6	Tao Guannan	China	4:14.85	
20	1	3	Kristaps Miķelsons	Latvia	4:19.33	
21	1	1	Mubal Azzam Ibrahim	Maldives	5:00.64	NR
	3	5	Brendon Smith	Australia	Disqualified	
	3	2	Leonardo Coelho Santos	Brazil	Did not start	

=== Final ===
The final was held at 20:50.

Rank	Lane	Name	Nationality	Time	Notes
1st place, gold medalist(s)	4	Daiya Seto	Japan	3:55.75	
2nd place, silver medalist(s)	5	Carson Foster	United States	3:57.63	
3rd place, bronze medalist(s)	3	Matthew Sates	South Africa	3:59.21	NR
4	1	Alberto Razzetti	Italy	4:00.45	
5	7	So Ogata	Japan	4:02.21	
6	6	Jake Foster	United States	4:02.51	
7	2	David Schlicht	Australia	4:04.33	
8	8	Richard Nagy	Slovakia	4:05.57	
