= Matthew Sates =

South African Olympic swimmer

Personal information
- Full name: Matthew Sates
- Nickname: Matt
- National team: South Africa
- Born: 28 July 2003 (age 22) Pietermaritzburg, South Africa

Sport
- Sport: Swimming
- Strokes: Butterfly, individual medley, freestyle
- Club: Seals Swimming Club (current) Georgia Bulldogs (former)
- College team: University of Georgia (former)
- Coach: Wayne Riddin (Personal)
Medal record
Men's swimming
Representing South Africa
World Championships (SC)
Gold medal – first place	2022 Melbourne	200 m medley
Bronze medal – third place	2022 Melbourne	400 m medley
Representing the Georgia Bulldogs
Event	1st	2nd	3rd
NCAA Championships	1	1	1
Total	1	1	1
By race
Event	1st	2nd	3rd
200 y freestyle	0	0	1
500 y freestyle	1	0	0
4×200 y freestyle	0	1	0
Total	1	1	1
NCAA Championships
Gold medal – first place	2022 Atlanta	500 y freestyle
Silver medal – second place	2022 Atlanta	4×200 y freestyle
Bronze medal – third place	2022 Atlanta	200 y freestyle

Matthew Sates (born 28 July 2003) is a South African swimmer. He is the African record holder in the short course 200 metre freestyle, 400 metre freestyle, and 200 metre individual medley as well as the South African record holder in the 400 metre individual medley. He is the 2022 World Short Course champion in the 200 metre individual medley and bronze medalist in the 400 metre individual medley. At the 2022 NCAA Division I Championships, he won the NCAA title in the 500 yard freestyle. For the 2021 FINA Swimming World Cup, he was the overall male winner, earning a total of 18 medals, including 13 gold medals.

== Background and details ==
Sates was born on 28 July 2003 and lives in Pietermaritzburg in South Africa with his mother and sister. He reportedly became a swimmer at a young age when he followed his older brother Tim into swimming. He has said of the sport, "Swimming has just always been a part of me." He attended St. Charles College in Pietermaritzburg.

He trains by Wayne Riddin at Seals Swimming Club in Pietermaritzburg and verbally committed to entering the University of Georgia in 2022 to train under Neil Versfeld, a renowned South African Olympic swimmer and coach. Competing for the Georgia Bulldogs during the 2021–2022 collegiate season, he won the NCAA title in the 500 yard freestyle in March 2022 before permanently relocating back to South Africa in April 2022 and becoming a professional swimmer.

== Career ==
=== 2019 World Junior Championships ===
At the 2019 FINA World Junior Swimming Championships, held at Danube Arena in Budapest, Hungary, Sates placed tenth in the 4×100 metre medley relay, 20th in the 200 metre individual medley with a 2:05.01, 29th in the 100 metre butterfly in 55.23 seconds, 37th in the 200 metre breaststroke with a time of 2:21.55, 40th in the 100 metre breaststroke with a 1:04.42, and 46th in the 50 metre breaststroke with a time of 30.43 seconds.

=== 2021 ===
==== 2020 Summer Olympics ====
At the 2021 South African Grand Prix in Durban in May 2021, Sates achieved Olympic Games cuts for the 200 metre individual medley, 1:57.60 in the prelims heats, and 100 metre butterfly, 51.83 seconds in a time trial. He competed in two events at the 2020 Summer Olympics in Tokyo, Japan. He qualified to compete in the Olympics (delayed until July 2021 due to the COVID-19 pandemic) in May 2021 and was called "the next Michael Phelps" in the media leading up to the start of competition. At the 2020 Olympic Games, Sates finished 14th in the 200 metre individual medley, just two places behind Chase Kalisz of the United States, and 32nd in the 100 metre butterfly.

==== 2021 Swimming World Cup ====
In the 2021 FINA Swimming World Cup, which consisted of four competitions across two continents in October 2021 and was conducted in short course metres, Sates was the overall highest-scoring male competitor with a total of 227 points across all four stops that earned him $140,000 of prize money. He also earned the most medals amongst all competitors, male or female, with a total of eighteen medals, which included thirteen gold medals, four silver medals, and one bronze medal.

Sates set his first world junior record of the World Cup circuit at the first stop, in Berlin, Germany, with a time of 1:51.45 in the 200 metre individual medley on 2 October. His swim also moved him to the eighth fastest swimmer in the event in history, just two spots and 31-hundredths of a second behind Caeleb Dressel of the United States. The next day, Sates set his second world junior record of the World Cup circuit with a time of 1:40.65 in the 200 metre freestyle, where he won the gold medal and finished less than two-tenths of a second ahead of the silver medalist in the event Kyle Chalmers of Australia. These first two world junior records earned Sates the number two spot on Swimming World's "The Week That Was" honour for the week of 4 October 2021. Four days later, on 7 October, at the second stop of the World Cup, held in Budapest, Hungary, Sates set his third world junior record, this time in the 400 metre freestyle with a time of 3:37.92. Sates winning multiple medals, setting multiple world junior records, and winning the overall male title was ranked as the number one moment from the 2021 Swimming World Cup by FINA.

==== 2021 World Short Course Championships ====
Sates entered to compete in five individual events, the 200 metre freestyle, 400 metre freestyle, 100 metre individual medley, 200 metre individual medley, and 400 metre individual medley, for the 2021 World Short Course Championships at Etihad Arena in Abu Dhabi, United Arab Emirates. Two days before the start of the competition, Sates was announced as withdrawing from the championships due to travel restrictions making it hard for him to leave the country of South Africa due to a surge in a new variant of COVID-19.

=== 2022 ===
On 21 January 2022, Sates arrived in Athens, Georgia in the United States to start competing collegiately as part of the Georgia Bulldogs at the University of Georgia with his first competition appearance scheduled for 29 January 2022. In his first collegiate competition, a dual meet against Emory University on 29 January, Sates won the 200 yard freestyle with a time of 1:33.89. He also swam a 4:31.29 in the 500 yard freestyle and a 1:49.23 in the 200 yard individual medley swimming exhibition.

==== 2022 Southeastern Conference Championships ====
In his first collegiate conference championships, the 2022 Southeastern Conference, SEC, Championships in February 2022, Sates swam a 1:31.82 for the lead-off leg of the 4×200 yard freestyle relay to help take second-place in 6:09.32 on day one. His time of 1:31.82 ranked Sates as the fifth-fastest male freshman in the 200 yard freestyle in the history of the NCAA, behind Townley Haas, Dean Farris, Cameron Craig, and Drew Kibler. In the prelims heats of the 500 yard freestyle on day two, Sates lowered his personal best time in the event by approximately 17 seconds to a 4:13.65 to rank third overall heading into the final. For the final of the 500 yard freestyle, Sates set a new pool record in a time of 4:09.06 and placed first, finishing over one second ahead of second-place finisher Kieran Smith. He qualified ranking first for the final of the 200 yard freestyle with a time of 1:32.59 in the prelims heats on day three. In the final, he won with a time of 1:31.16, breaking the pool record of 1:31.65 set in 2013 and finishing 0.23 seconds ahead of second-place finisher Brooks Curry. On Day four of competition, Sates ranked third in the prelims heat of the 200 yard butterfly, qualifying for the final with a time of 1:41.91, which was 1.83 seconds behind first-ranked Luca Urlando. In the final, he placed second with a 1:39.88, this time finishing 0.88 seconds behind Luca Urlando. For the 4×100 yard medley relay later in the session, Sates and Luca Urlando were part of the same relay team, with Sates splitting a 46.03 for the butterfly leg of the relay to help finish fourth in 3:04.76. On the fifth and final day, he led off the 4×100 yard freestyle relay in 42.71 to help achieve a time of 2:50.65 and a fourth-place finish.

Following his performances at the SEC Championships, Sates swam the 400 yard individual medley in 3:41.85 and the 200 yard individual medley in 1:44.83 at the 2022 Bulldog Last Chance Meet in an attempt to see if he could qualify for the 2022 NCAA Championships in the events.

==== 2022 NCAA Championships ====
2022 NCAA Championships
Gold medal – first place	500 yd freestyle	4:06.61 (CR)
Silver medal – second place	4×200 yd freestyle	6:05.59
Bronze medal – third place	200 yd freestyle	1:30.72

On day one of the 2022 NCAA Championships in March, Sates opened the 4×200 yard freestyle with a 1:30.78 for the lead-off leg, helping achieve a final mark of 6:05.59 and a second-place finish. The morning of day two, he ranked first in the prelims heats of the 500 yard freestyle with a time of 4:08.73, qualifying for the evening final. He swam a 4:06.61 in the final, winning the event and setting new NCAA Championships and pool records. On the third day, he advanced to the final of the 200 yard freestyle, ranking second behind Drew Kibler with a time of 1:31.11 from the prelims heats. In the final, he won his second individual medal of the Championships, finishing third with a personal best time of 1:30.72. For his second final of the session, he swam the 100 yard butterfly portion of the 4×100 yard medley relay in 46.39 seconds, contributing to a final time of 3:03.92 and a twelfth-place finish. On the fourth and final day, he swam a 1:43.34 and placed 29th in the 200 yard butterfly. Concluding his first NCAA Championships, Sates swam a 42.90 for the third leg of the 4×100 yard freestyle relay to help place eleventh in a combined time of 2:48.81.

==== 2022 South Africa Championships ====
At the 2022 South Africa National Swimming Championships in Gqeberha in April, Sates qualified for the final of the 400 metre freestyle on day one with a time of 3:54.94 in the prelims heats. In the evening finals session, he won the gold medal in the 400 metre freestyle with a 3:49.37 and the bronze medal in the 50 metre butterfly with a time of 24.28 seconds. On day two, he swam a 1:47.09 in the prelims heats of the 200 metre freestyle to qualify for the evening final ranking first. In the final, he won the gold medal with a time of 1:46.15, which achieved him a qualifying time in the 200 metre freestyle for the 2022 World Aquatics Championships and 2022 Commonwealth Games, and won a gold medal in the 4×100 metre freestyle relay, swimming the lead-off leg for the relay team from KwaZulu-Natal. It was his first time qualifying for a World Aquatics Championships and a Commonwealth Games. On the third day, he won the gold medal in the 100 metre freestyle with a personal best time of 48.97 seconds. For the 100 metre butterfly on day four, he won the silver medal with a time of 52.06 seconds, finishing only behind Chad le Clos. In the first prelims heat of the 200 metre individual medley on the sixth and final day, he swam a World Championships and Commonwealth Games qualifying time of 1:59.13 and qualified for the evening final, where he went on to lower his time to a 1:58.37 and win the gold medal. He had also entered to swim the 400 metre individual medley and 200 metre butterfly; however, due to wear on his shoulders from swimming butterfly, he chose to withdraw and not compete in those events. In May, Swimming South Africa also named Sates to the World Championships team in the 100 metre freestyle and 400 metre freestyle. In June, he was named to the 2022 Commonwealth Games swim team representing South Africa.

==== 2022 Mare Nostrum ====
At the 2022 Mare Nostrum stop in Monaco, Sates swam a personal best time of 1:57.43 in the 200 metre individual medley, winning the event. A few days later, at the stop in Barcelona, Spain, he won the 200 metre freestyle with another personal best time, finishing in 1:45.91 and setting a new meet record in the event.

==== 2022 World Aquatics Championships ====
In the preliminaries of the 200 metre freestyle at the 2022 World Aquatics Championships on 19 June, Sates qualified for the semifinals ranking fourteenth with a 1:47.28. He tied Katsuhiro Matsumoto of Japan for twelfth-place in the semifinals with a time of 1:46.63. The day before, he placed eleventh in the preliminaries of the 400 metre individual medley with a time of 4:14.81. For the prelims of the 200 metre individual medley two days later, he swam a 1:58.61 and qualified for the semifinals ranking seventh. Finishing with a time of 1:57.74 in semifinal heat number two, he qualified for the final ranking eighth. In the final, he swam a 1:58.27 and placed eighth. The final of the 200 metre individual medley was both his first final at a long course metres World Championships as well as the first final at the 2022 World Aquatics Championships in which South Africa had a swimmer compete. One day later, he placed 41st in the 100 metre butterfly with a time of 54.17 seconds.

==== 2022 Commonwealth Games ====
Day one of swimming at the 2022 Commonwealth Games, held in Birmingham, England, Sates advanced to the final in the 400 metre freestyle ranking sixth in the preliminaries with a time of 3:49.69. He placed seventh in the final with a time of 3:50.07. On day two, he ranked seventh in the preliminaries of the 200 metre freestyle with a 1:48.25 and qualified for the event final. Later, in the same preliminaries session, he achieved a qualification for the final in the 400 metre individual medley, ranking third overall with a time of 4:19.04. He lowered his time to 1:47.75 in the evening final of the 200 metre freestyle, placing sixth. For the final of the 400 metre individual medley, he placed fourth with a time of 4:16.61. Three days later, he ranked fourteenth in the preliminaries of the 100 metre butterfly with a time of 54.02 seconds and qualified for the semifinals.

Sates withdrew from the semifinals of the 100 metre butterfly, instead focusing on the 4×200 metre freestyle relay final, where he split a 1:47.07 for the lead-off leg of the relay to help achieve a final mark of 7:13.76 and place sixth. The next morning, he swam the butterfly leg of the 4×100 metre mixed medley relay in a time of 53.57 seconds in the preliminaries to help qualify the relay for the final ranking fourth. Chad le Clos substituted in for Sates on the finals relay, lowered the butterfly time by over two full seconds and helped achieve a fourth-place finish in the event. On the sixth and final day, he placed twelfth in the 200 metre individual medley with a time of 2:01.99.

==== 2022 Swimming World Cup ====
Sates won his first gold medal of the 2022 FINA Swimming World Cup circuit at the first stop, in Berlin, Germany, in the 400 metre freestyle with an African record, South African record, and personal best time of 3:36.30, finishing 0.97 seconds ahead of Kieran Smith of the United States. He followed his gold medal up with a silver medal in the 100 metre individual medley, finishing one-tenth of a second behind gold medalist Thomas Ceccon with a personal best time of 51.62 seconds. On the second day, he won the gold medal in the 200 metre individual medley with a time of 1:51.64. On the third day, he won the 400 metre individual medley ahead of Alberto Razzetti of Italy, with a time of 4:02.95, and the 200 metre freestyle, where he finished 0.21 seconds ahead of Kyle Chalmers in 1:40.88. He ranked as the highest-scoring male competitor across all of his events in Berlin.

On day one at the next stop, in Toronto, Canada, Sates collected an additional two medals, the first in the 400 metre freestyle with a 3:37.52 and the second in the 100 metre individual medley with a 51.87. The next day, he placed fourth in the 200 metre individual medley in a time of 1:52.89, which was 2.52 seconds behind gold medalist Shaine Casas of the United States who, with his win, also moved ahead of Sates into the overall number one rank for the World Cup by a margin of 0.7 points. He finished up on day three with a gold medal in the 400 metre individual medley with a time of 4:02.65 and a tie for fourth place in the 200 metre freestyle with a 1:42.46.

For the third and final stop of the circuit, held in November in Indianapolis, United States, Sates won one medal, a gold medal in the 400 metre individual medley on day three with a time of 4:04.12. Summing the points he earned for each of his performances across all three stops of the 2022 circuit, he ranked as the fifth overall highest-scoring male competitor with 154.1 points.

==== 2022 World Short Course Championships ====
2022 World Championships (SC)
Gold medal – first place	200 m individual medley	1:50.15 (AF)
Bronze medal – third place	400 m individual medley	3:59.21 (NR)

Day one at the 2022 World Short Course Championships in Melbourne, Australia, Sates split a 57.31 for the anchor leg of the 4×100 metre freestyle relay to help place thirteenth overall. In the evening, he won the world title and gold medal in the 200 metre individual medley with an African record, Commonwealth record, and South African record time of 1:50.15, which was a 1.30 second drop from his previous best time and record marks in the event. Two days later, he placed twelfth in the 400 metre freestyle with a time of 3:41.05. On day five of six, he finished in a South African record time of 3:59.21 in the final of the 400 metre individual medley to win the bronze medal. In his final event, the 200 metre freestyle on the sixth and final day, he placed thirteenth overall with a time of 1:43.22.

=== 2023 ===
At the 2023 South Africa National Championships, held in April in Gqeberha and conducted in long course metres, Sates won the gold medal and national title in the 200 metre freestyle on day one with a time of 1:47.92. He followed up with another national title in an individual event the following day, winning the gold medal in the 200 metre individual medley with a time of 1:59.95. On the evening of day three, he won the gold medal in the 400 metre individual medley with a time of 4:22.26 after winning the bronze medal in the 100 metre freestyle with a time of 49.20 seconds, which was 0.01 seconds behind silver medalist Pieter Coetze. In the 100 metre butterfly on day four, he achieved a 2023 World Aquatics Championships qualifying time of 51.91 seconds in the final and won the silver medal. He won the gold medal and national title in the 400 metre freestyle on the fifth and final day with a time of 3:55.48.

== International championships (50 m) ==
Meet	100 free	200 free	400 free	50 breast	100 breast	200 breast	100 fly	200 fly	200 medley	400 medley	4×200 free	4×100 medley	4×100 mixed free	4×100 mixed medley
Junior level
WJC 2019				46th	40th	37th	29th		20th			10th		
Senior level
OG 2020				—N/a			32nd		14th				—N/a	
WC 2022		12th	DNS				41st		8th	11th				
CG 2022	DNS	6th	7th				14th (h,WD)		12th	4th	6th			4th^{[a]}
WC 2024		27th					10th	8th	16th	17th				
OG 2024				—N/a			35th	20th	21st				—N/a	
WC 2025		32nd							28th	DNS			19th	

^{a} Sates swam only in the prelims heats.

== International championships (25 m) ==
Meet	200 freestyle	400 freestyle	200 medley	400 medley	4×100 freestyle
WC 2022	13th	12th	1st place, gold medalist(s)	3rd place, bronze medalist(s)	13th

== Collegiate championships (25 yd) ==
Meet	200 free	500 free	200 fly	4×100 free	4×200 free	4×100 medley
NCAA 2022	3rd place, bronze medalist(s)	1st place, gold medalist(s)	29th	11th	2nd place, silver medalist(s)	12th

== Personal best times ==
As of 17 December 2022

=== Long course metres (50 m pool) ===
Event	Time		Meet	Location	Date	Age	Ref
100 m freestyle	48.97		2022 SA National Swimming Championships	Gqeberha	8 April 2022	18	
200 m freestyle	1:45.91		2022 Mare Nostrum - Barcelona	Barcelona, Spain	25 May 2022	18	
400 m freestyle	3:49.37		2022 SA National Swimming Championships	Gqeberha	6 April 2022	18	
100 m butterfly	51.83	tt	2021 South Africa Grand Prix No. 4	Durban	28 May 2021	17	
200 m individual medley	1:57.43		2022 Mare Nostrum - Monaco	Monaco	21 May 2022	18	

Legend: tt – time trial

=== Short course metres (25 m pool) ===
Event	Time	Meet	Location	Date	Age	Notes	Ref
200 m freestyle	1:40.65	2021 FINA Swimming World Cup	Berlin, Germany	3 October 2021	18	AF, NR, WJ	
400 m freestyle	3:36.30	2022 FINA Swimming World Cup	Berlin, Germany	21 October 2022	19	AF, NR	
100 m individual medley	51.62	2022 FINA Swimming World Cup	Berlin, Germany	21 October 2022	19		
200 m individual medley	1:50.15	2022 World Short Course Championships	Melbourne, Australia	13 December 2022	19	AF, CR, NR	
400 m individual medley	3:59.21	2022 World Short Course Championships	Melbourne, Australia	17 December 2022	19	NR	

Legend: AF – African record; CR – Commonwealth record; NR – South African record; WJ – World Junior record;
Records not set in finals: h – heat; sf – semifinal; r – relay 1st leg; rh – relay heat 1st leg; b – B final; † – en route to final mark; so – swim-off; tt – time trial

=== Short course yards (25 yd pool) ===
Event	Time		Meet	Location	Date	Age	Ref
100 yd freestyle	42.71	r	2022 Southeastern Conference Championships	Knoxville, United States	19 February 2022	18	
200 yd freestyle	1:30.72		2022 NCAA Championships	Atlanta, United States	25 March 2022	18	
500 yd freestyle	4:06.61		2022 NCAA Championships	Atlanta, United States	24 March 2022	18	
200 yd butterfly	1:39.88		2022 Southeastern Conference Championships	Knoxville, United States	18 February 2022	18	
200 yd individual medley	1:44.83	tt	2022 Bulldog Last Chance Meet	Athens, United States	26 February 2022	18	
400 yd individual medley	3:41.85		2022 Bulldog Last Chance Meet	Athens, United States	26 February 2022	18	

Legend: r – relay 1st leg; tt – time trial

== Swimming World Cup circuits ==
The following medals Sates has won at Swimming World Cup circuits.

Edition	Gold medals	Silver medals	Bronze medals	Total
2021	13	4	1	18
2022	7	1	1	9
2023	8	3	0	11
Total	28	8	2	38

== Records ==
=== World junior records ===
==== Short course metres (25 m pool) ====
No.	Event	Time	Meet	Location	Date	Age	Status	Ref
1	200 m individual medley	1:51.45	2021 FINA Swimming World Cup	Berlin, Germany	2 October 2021	18	Current	
2	200 m freestyle	1:40.65	2021 FINA Swimming World Cup	Berlin, Germany	3 October 2021	18	Current	
3	400 m freestyle	3:37.92	2021 FINA Swimming World Cup	Budapest, Hungary	7 October 2021	18	Former	

=== Continental and national records ===
==== Short course metres (25 m pool) ====
No.	Event	Time	Meet	Location	Date	Type	Status	Notes	Ref
1	200 m individual medley	1:51.45	2021 FINA Swimming World Cup	Berlin, Germany	2 October 2021	AF, NR	Former	WJ, Former CR	
2	200 m freestyle	1:40.65	2021 FINA Swimming World Cup	Berlin, Germany	3 October 2021	AF, NR	Current	WJ	
3	400 m freestyle	3:36.30	2022 FINA Swimming World Cup	Berlin, Germany	21 October 2022	AF, NR	Current		
4	200 m individual medley (2)	1:50.15	2022 World Short Course Championships	Melbourne, Australia	13 December 2022	AF, NR	Current	CR	
5	400 m individual medley	3:59.21	2022 World Short Course Championships	Melbourne, Australia	17 December 2022	NR	Current		

Legend: AF – African record; CR – Commonwealth record; NR – South African record; WJ – World Junior record;
Records not set in finals: h – heat; sf – semifinal; r – relay 1st leg; rh – relay heat 1st leg; b – B final; † – en route to final mark; so – swim-off; tt – time trial

== Awards and honours ==
- FINA, Top 10 Moments: 2021 Swimming World Cup (#1)
- Southeastern Conference (SEC), Freshman Swimmer of the Year (male): 2021–2022
- Swimming World, The Week That Was: 4 October 2021 (#2)
- SwimSwam, Top 100 (Men's): 2022 (#44)
- SwimSwam, Swammy Award honorable mention, NCAA Freshman of the Year (Men's): 2022

Sporting positions
Preceded by (Russia) Vladimir Morozov	FINA Swimming World Cup; Overall male winner 2021	Succeeded by (Trinidad and Tobago) Dylan Carter
