= 2024 World Aquatics Swimming Championships (25 m) – Men's 200 metre individual medley =

Swimming competition

Men's 200 metre individual medley at the 2024 World Aquatics Swimming Championships (25 m)
- Venue: Duna Arena
- Location: Budapest, Hungary
- Dates: 10 December (heats and final)
- Competitors: 49 from 45 nations
- Winning time: 1:49.51

Medalists
gold medal	Shaine Casas	United States
silver medal	Alberto Razzetti	Italy
bronze medal	Finlay Knox	Canada

The men's 200 metre individual medley event (or 200IM event) at the 2024 World Aquatics Swimming Championships (25 m) was held on 10 December 2024 at the Duna Arena in Budapest, Hungary.

== Records ==
Prior to the competition, the existing world and championship records were as follows:

World record	Leon Marchand (FRA)	1:48.88	Singapore	1 November 2024
Competition record	Ryan Lochte (USA)	1:49.63	Istanbul, Turkey	14 December 2012

The following record was established during the competition:

Date	Round	Name	Nationality	Time	Record
10 December	Final	Shaine Casas	United States	1:49.51	CR

== Background ==
Five of the top six finishers from the 2022 Short Course World Championships returned for the event, including Carson Foster of the United States, Finlay Knox of Canada, Shaine Casas of the United States, Daiya Seto of Japan, and Italy’s Alberto Razzetti. Foster held a lifetime best of 1:50.66, while Casas entered as the fastest in the field with a best of 1:50.37, making him the fourth-fastest performer in history. Knox, the Doha 2024 world champion in long course, had focused on the 200 IM after skipping it at recent short-course meets. Seto, a former world champion, competed despite a cracked rib and had swum 1:51.91 earlier in the season. Razzetti swam a lifetime best of 1:52.13 at the 2023 European Short Course Championships. Switzerland’s Noè Ponti also emerged as a contender after a 1:51.78 at the World Cup. Neutral athletes Ilya Borodin (1:52.75) and Aleksei Sudarev (1:53.50) were also in the field. Spain’s Carles Coll and Turkey’s Berke Saka were additional finalists in contention.

SwimSwam predicted Ponti would win, Foster would place second, and Razzetti would finish third.

== Results ==
=== Heats ===
The heats were started at 11:01.

Rank	Heat	Lane	Name	Nationality	Time	Notes
1	6	7	Shaine Casas	United States	1:51.52	Q
2	6	5	Alberto Razzetti	Italy	1:52.21	Q
3	4	7	Finlay Knox	Canada	1:52.24	Q
4	4	2	Carson Foster	United States	1:52.59	Q
5	5	4	Daiya Seto	Japan	1:53.20	Q
6	4	4	Ilya Borodin	Neutral Athletes B	1:53.30	Q
7	4	5	Berke Saka	Turkey	1:53.43	Q, NR
8	5	3	David Schlicht	Australia	1:53.55	Q
9	4	8	Max Litchfield	Great Britain	1:53.63	R
10	4	9	Tristan Jankovics	Canada	1:53.81	R
11	5	6	Leonardo Coelho Santos	Brazil	1:54.51	
12	5	5	Aleksei Sudarev	Neutral Athletes B	1:54.88	
13	5	8	Gabor Zombori	Hungary	1:54.93	
14	6	6	Huang Zhiwei	China	1:55.00	
15	6	0	Dominik Török	Hungary	1:55.06	
16	3	7	Munzer Kabbara	Lebanon	1:55.31	NR
17	5	2	Vadym Naumenko	Ukraine	1:55.35	NR
18	6	1	Jakub Bursa	Czech Republic	1:55.43	NR
19	3	0	Samuel Törnqvist	Sweden	1:55.53	
20	6	2	Robert Badea	Romania	1:55.67	
21	4	1	Apostolos Papastamos	Greece	1:55.90	
22	3	5	Cedric Büssing	Germany	1:56.11	
23	4	6	Ronny Brännkärr	Finland	1:56.18	
24	3	4	Jaouad Syoud	Algeria	1:56.36	NR
25	4	3	He Yubo	China	1:57.52	
26	3	6	Patrick Groters	Aruba	1:57.61	NR
27	3	1	Erick Gordillo	Guatemala	1:58.03	NR
28	5	7	Kim Min-suk	South Korea	1:58.17	
29	2	4	Matheo Mateos	Paraguay	1:58.18	NR
30	6	8	Jakub Poliačik	Slovakia	1:58.70	
31	2	5	Kristaps Miķelsons	Latvia	1:58.80	
32	2	6	Oliver Durand	Namibia	1:59.26	NR
33	3	9	Juraj Barčot	Croatia	1:59.47	
34	5	1	Samuel Lewis Brown	New Zealand	1:59.55	
35	6	9	Kian Keylock	South Africa	1:59.69	
36	5	0	Birnir Freyr Hálfdánarson	Iceland	2:00.54	
37	4	0	Belhassen Ben Miled	Tunisia	2:00.75	
38	3	8	Jarod Arroyo	Puerto Rico	2:01.01	
39	2	2	Sam Williamson	Bermuda	2:01.07	NR
40	2	3	Ardi Azman	Singapore	2:01.41	
40	3	3	Tan Khai Xin	Malaysia	2:01.41	
42	3	2	Mohamed Mahmoud	Qatar	2:01.42	
43	5	9	Wang Hsing-hao	Chinese Taipei	2:01.59	
44	1	3	Matin Balsini	World Aquatics Refugee Team	2:03.02	
45	1	4	Adam Chillingworth	Hong Kong	2:03.45	
46	2	8	Adnan Al-Abdallat	Jordan	2:07.05	
47	2	7	Kaeden Gleason	United States Virgin Islands	2:07.96	
48	2	1	Israel Poppe	Guam	2:11.02	
49	1	5	Leo Nzimbi	Central African Republic	2:26.52	
	6	3	Carles Coll	Spain	Did not start	
	6	4	Noè Ponti	Switzerland	Did not start	

=== Final ===
The final was held at 18:11.

Rank	Lane	Name	Nationality	Time	Notes
1st place, gold medalist(s)	4	Shaine Casas	United States	1:49.51	CR, AM
2nd place, silver medalist(s)	5	Alberto Razzetti	Italy	1:50.88	NR
3rd place, bronze medalist(s)	3	Finlay Knox	Canada	1:50.90	NR
4	6	Carson Foster	United States	1:51.32	
5	8	David Schlicht	Australia	1:52.81	
6	7	Ilya Borodin	Neutral Athletes B	1:52.87	
7	1	Berke Saka	Turkey	1:53.29	NR
8	2	Daiya Seto	Japan	1:54.01	
