= Swimming at the 2022 Commonwealth Games – Men's 100 metre backstroke =

Men's 100 metre backstroke at the 2022 Commonwealth Games
- Venue: Sandwell Aquatics Centre
- Dates: 29 July (heats, semifinals); 30 July (final)
- Competitors: 38 from 27 nations
- Winning time: 53.78

Medalists
gold medal	Pieter Coetze	South Africa
silver medal	Brodie Williams	England
bronze medal	Bradley Woodward	Australia

The men's 100 metre backstroke event at the 2022 Commonwealth Games will be held on 29 and 30 July at the Sandwell Aquatics Centre.

== Records ==
Prior to this competition, the existing world, Commonwealth and Games records were as follows:

World record	Thomas Ceccon (ITA)	51.60	Budapest, Hungary	22 June 2022
Commonwealth record	Mitch Larkin (AUS)	52.11	Dubai, United Arab Emirates	6 November 2015
Games record	Chris Walker-Hebborn (ENG)	53.12	Glasgow, United Kingdom	25 July 2014

== Schedule ==
The schedule is as follows:

All times are British Summer Time (UTC+1)

Date	Time	Round
Friday 29 July 2022	11:49	Qualifying
Friday 29 July 2022	20:44	Semifinals
Saturday 30 July 2022	21:05	Final

== Results ==
=== Heats ===
Rank	Heat	Lane	Name	Nationality	Time	Notes
1	3	4	Pieter Coetze	South Africa	53.91	Q
2	4	6	Brodie Williams	England	54.49	Q
3	3	3	Bradley Woodward	Australia	54.54	Q
4	4	4	Luke Greenbank	England	54.55	Q
5	4	5	Srihari Nataraj	India	54.68	Q
6	5	5	Andrew Jeffcoat	New Zealand	54.79	Q
7	5	4	Mitch Larkin	Australia	54.85	Q
8	5	3	Joshua Edwards-Smith	Australia	54.97	Q
9	4	3	Javier Acevedo	Canada	54.99	Q
10	5	2	Martyn Walton	Scotland	55.01	Q
11	3	6	Craig McNally	Scotland	55.09	Q
12	5	6	Joe Small	Wales	55.13	Q
13	3	5	Quah Zheng Wen	Singapore	55.67	Q
14	4	7	James McFadzen	England	55.75	Q
15	4	2	Liam White	Wales	55.90	Q
16	3	7	Harry Shalamon	Jersey	56.07	Q
17	5	7	Scott Gibson	Scotland	56.54	R
18	3	2	Jack Kirby	Cook Islands	56.55	R
19	4	1	Davante Carey	Bahamas	57.27	
20	5	1	Jack Harvey	Bermuda	57.31	NR
21	5	8	Lamar Taylor	Bahamas	57.51	
22	2	2	Keanan Dols	Jamaica	57.80	
23	3	1	Sofoklis Mougis	Cyprus	58.09	
24	3	8	Zackary Gresham	Grenada	59.55	
25	4	8	Harry Robinson	Isle of Man	59.66	
26	2	4	Bede Aitu	Cook Islands	59.77	
27	2	6	Warren Lawrence	Dominica	1:00.13	
28	2	5	Nathaniel Thomas	Jamaica	1:00.27	
29	1	4	Atuhaire Ambala	Uganda	1:01.68	NR
30	2	3	Alan Koti Lopeti Uhi	Tonga	1:01.94	
31	2	7	Jordan Gonzalez	Gibraltar	1:02.10	
32	2	1	Tyler Fred	Seychelles	1:02.14	
33	1	6	Rohan Karim Shearer	Turks and Caicos Islands	1:03.16	
34	1	5	Sekhel Tzedeq	Guyana	1:03.37	
35	2	8	Kokoro Frost	Samoa	1:05.05	
36	1	3	Mohamed Aan Hussain	Maldives	1:07.07	
37	1	2	Mohamed Rihan Shiham	Maldives	1:11.87	
38	1	7	Joshua Yon	Saint Helena	1:12.95	

=== Semifinals ===
Rank	Heat	Lane	Name	Nationality	Time	Notes
1	2	4	Pieter Coetze	South Africa	53.67	Q
2	1	4	Brodie Williams	England	54.00	Q
3	1	3	Andrew Jeffcoat	New Zealand	54.01	Q
4	2	5	Bradley Woodward	Australia	54.02	Q
5	1	5	Luke Greenbank	England	54.23	Q
6	2	6	Mitch Larkin	Australia	54.26	Q
7	2	3	Srihari Nataraj	India	54.55	Q
8	1	6	Joshua Edwards-Smith	Australia	54.78	Q
9	2	2	Javier Acevedo	Canada	54.81	R
10	2	7	Craig McNally	Scotland	54.86	R
11	1	7	Joe Small	Wales	55.22	
12	1	1	James McFadzen	England	55.50	
12	1	2	Martyn Walton	Scotland	55.50	
14	2	8	Liam White	Wales	55.68	
15	1	8	Harry Shalamon	Jersey	56.25	
16	2	1	Quah Zheng Wen	Singapore	56.41	

=== Final ===
Rank	Lane	Name	Nationality	Time	Notes
1st place, gold medalist(s)	4	Pieter Coetze	South Africa	53.78	
2nd place, silver medalist(s)	5	Brodie Williams	England	53.91	
3rd place, bronze medalist(s)	6	Bradley Woodward	Australia	54.06	
4	3	Andrew Jeffcoat	New Zealand	54.13	
5	2	Luke Greenbank	England	54.28	
6	7	Mitch Larkin	Australia	54.30	
7	1	Srihari Nataraj	India	54.31	
8	8	Joshua Edwards-Smith	Australia	54.83	
