= James McFadzen =

English swimmer

Personal information
- Full name: James David McFadzen
- Nationality: British (English)
- Born: 1 January 1999 (age 27) High Wycombe, Buckinghamshire, England

Sport
- Sport: Swimming
- Event: backstroke

James David McFadzen (born 1 January 1999) is an English international swimmer. He has represented England at the Commonwealth Games.

== Biography ==
McFadzen was educated at Loughborough University and played rugby before switching to swimming. He won the bronze medal in the 200 metre individual medley at the 2022 British Swimming Championships.

In 2022, he was selected for the 2022 Commonwealth Games in Birmingham where he competed in the men's 100 metre backstroke, finishing in 14th place.
