= David Schlicht =

Australian swimmer

Personal information
- Nationality: Australian
- Born: September 3, 1999 (age 27) Melbourne, Australia

Sport
- Sport: Swimming
- Strokes: Individual medley, breaststroke
Medal record
Men's swimming
Representing Australia
World Championships (SC)
Silver medal – second place	2024 Budapest	4×200 m freestyle

David Schlicht (born 3 September 1999) is an Australian competitive swimmer who specializes in individual medley and breaststroke events. He has represented Australia at multiple FINA World Swimming Championships (25 m), including the 2018 edition in Hangzhou, the 2022 edition in Melbourne—where he placed seventh in the 400-metre individual medley—and the 2024 championships in Budapest, where he won a silver medal in the 4×200-metre freestyle relay and placed fifth in the 200-metre individual medley.

Schlicht competed collegiately in the United States, first representing the University of Arizona at the NCAA Division I Championships in 2019 and 2021. He placed sixth in the 400-yard individual medley in 2019, and in 2021 finished fourth in the 400-yard individual medley and sixth in the 200-yard individual medley. He later transferred to Arizona State University, where he was a member of the Sun Devils' 2024 NCAA Championship-winning team. At that meet, he won silver in the 400-yard individual medley, and placed fifth in the 200-yard breaststroke and sixth in the 200-yard individual medley.

== Career ==
=== Collegiate career ===
David Schlicht began his NCAA career competing for the University of Arizona. At the 2019 NCAA Division I Championships, he placed sixth in the 400-yard individual medley. In the 2021 NCAA Championships, Schlicht improved his standings by finishing fourth in the 400-yard individual medley and sixth in the 200-yard individual medley.

He later transferred to Arizona State University, where he was a key member of the Sun Devils' 2024 NCAA Championship-winning team. At the 2024 NCAA Championships, Schlicht won a silver medal in the 400-yard individual medley, placed sixth in the 200-yard individual medley, and finished fifth in the 200-yard breaststroke.

=== International career ===
Schlicht made his international debut at the 2018 FINA World Swimming Championships (25 m) in Hangzhou. He also competed at the 2022 World Swimming Championships (25 m) in Melbourne, where he placed seventh in the 400-metre individual medley.

At the 2024 World Swimming Championships (25 m) in Budapest, Schlicht contributed to Australia’s success by winning a silver medal in the men's 4×200-metre freestyle relay and placing fifth in the 200-metre individual medley.
