= Swimming at the 2022 Commonwealth Games – Men's 200 metre backstroke =

Men's 200 metre backstroke at the 2022 Commonwealth Games
- Venue: Sandwell Aquatics Centre
- Dates: 2 August
- Competitors: 20 from 14 nations
- Winning time: 1:56.40

Medalists
gold medal	Brodie Williams	England
silver medal	Bradley Woodward	Australia
bronze medal	Pieter Coetze	South Africa

The men's 200 metre backstroke event at the 2022 Commonwealth Games was held on 2 August at the Sandwell Aquatics Centre.

== Records ==
Prior to this competition, the existing world, Commonwealth and Games records were as follows:

Record	Time	Athlete (nation)	Meet	Location	Date	Ref
World record	1:51.92	Aaron Peirsol (USA)		Rome, Italy	31 July 2009	
Commonwealth record	1:53.17	Mitch Larkin (AUS)		Dubai, United Arab Emirates	7 November 2015	
Games record	1:55.58	James Goddard (ENG)		Delhi, India	6 October 2010	

== Schedule ==
The schedule is as follows:

All times are British Summer Time (UTC+1)

Date	Time	Round
Tuesday 2 August 2022	10:30	Qualifying
Tuesday 2 August 2022	19:13	Final

== Results ==
=== Heats ===
Rank	Heat	Lane	Name	Nationality	Time	Notes
1	2	4	Luke Greenbank	England	1:56.33	Q
2	1	4	Brodie Williams	England	1:57.88	Q
3	1	5	Bradley Woodward	Australia	1:57.99	Q
4	2	5	Pieter Coetze	South Africa	1:58.08	Q
5	1	3	Craig McNally	Scotland	1:58.36	Q
6	3	5	Joshua Edwards-Smith	Australia	1:58.74	Q
7	3	4	Mitch Larkin	Australia	1:59.59	Q
8	3	3	Jay Lelliott	England	2:00.65	Q
9	2	6	Srihari Nataraj	India	2:00.84	R, NR
10	3	6	Khiew Hoe Yean	Malaysia	2:02.01	R
11	2	3	Andrew Jeffcoat	New Zealand	2:03.57	
12	2	2	Harry Shalamon	Jersey	2:04.78	
13	1	6	Jack Harvey	Bermuda	2:05.93	NR
14	3	2	Guy Brooks	South Africa	2:07.49	
15	1	2	Isaac Dodds	Jersey	2:10.80	
16	2	7	Bede Aitu	Cook Islands	2:11.64	
17	1	7	Samuel Lowe	Guernsey	2:11.73	
18	3	7	Davante Carey	Bahamas	2:12.22	
19	3	1	Zackary Gresham	Grenada	2:14.29	NR
20	2	1	Mohamed Rihan Shiham	Maldives	2:37.33	

=== Final ===
Rank	Lane	Name	Nationality	Time	Notes
1st place, gold medalist(s)	5	Brodie Williams	England	1:56.40	
2nd place, silver medalist(s)	3	Bradley Woodward	Australia	1:56.41	
3rd place, bronze medalist(s)	6	Pieter Coetze	South Africa	1:56.77	
4	1	Mitch Larkin	Australia	1:56.91	
5	4	Luke Greenbank	England	1:56.98	
6	7	Joshua Edwards-Smith	Australia	1:57.50	
7	2	Craig McNally	Scotland	1:58.65	
8	8	Jay Lelliott	England	2:01.64	
