= Pieter Coetze =

South African swimmer (born 2004)

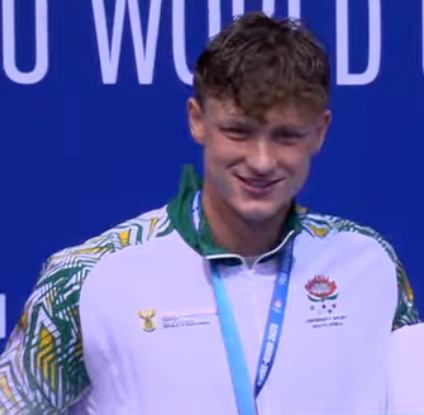
- At the 2025 Summer World University Games

Personal information
- Nationality: South African
- Born: 13 May 2004 (age 22) Pretoria, South Africa
- Height: 1.97 m (6 ft 6 in)

Sport
- Sport: Swimming
- Strokes: Backstroke
Medal record
Men's swimming
Representing South Africa
Event	1st	2nd	3rd
World Championships (LC)	1	2	1
Commonwealth Games	4	2	3
Summer Universiade	2	1	0
Total	7	5	4
World Championships (LC)
Gold medal – first place	2025 Singapore	100 m backstroke
Silver medal – second place	2025 Singapore	50 m backstroke
Silver medal – second place	2025 Singapore	200 m backstroke
Bronze medal – third place	2024 Doha	200 m backstroke
Commonwealth Games
Gold medal – first place	2022 Birmingham	100 m backstroke
Gold medal – first place	2026 Glasgow	50 m backstroke
Gold medal – first place	2026 Glasgow	100 m backstroke
Gold medal – first place	2026 Glasgow	200 m backstroke
Silver medal – second place	2022 Birmingham	50 m backstroke
Silver medal – second place	2026 Glasgow	4×100 m mixed medley
Bronze medal – third place	2022 Birmingham	200 m backstroke
Bronze medal – third place	2026 Glasgow	4×100 m freestyle
Bronze medal – third place	2026 Glasgow	4×100 m medley
World University Games
Gold medal – first place	2025 Rhine-Ruhr	50 m backstroke
Gold medal – first place	2025 Rhine-Ruhr	100 m backstroke
Silver medal – second place	2025 Rhine-Ruhr	100 m freestyle
World Junior Championships
Gold medal – first place	2022 Lima	200 m backstroke
Silver medal – second place	2022 Lima	50 m backstroke
Silver medal – second place	2022 Lima	100 m backstroke
Silver medal – second place	2022 Lima	4×100 m medley
Bronze medal – third place	2022 Lima	4×100 m mixed medley

Pieter Theunis Coetze (born 13 May 2004) is a South African swimmer. He is the African record holder in the long course and short course 100 metre backstroke and short course 50 metre backstroke. At the 2022 Commonwealth Games, he won the gold medal in the 100 metre backstroke, the silver medal in the 50 metre backstroke, and the bronze medal in the 200 metre backstroke. At the 2022 World Junior Championships, he competed in ten events, including winning the gold medal in the 200 metre backstroke, silver medals in the 50 metre backstroke, 100 metre backstroke, and the 4×100 metre medley relay, as well as a bronze medal in the 4×100 metre mixed medley relay.

== Career ==
For the 2019 World Junior Championships, held at Danube Arena in Budapest, Hungary in August, Coetze placed ninth in the 50 metre backstroke, tenth in the 4×100 metre medley relay, 15th in the mixed 4×100 metre medley relay, 27th in the 100 metre backstroke, and 29th in the 200 metre backstroke. In the 100 metre backstroke preliminary heats at the 2020 Summer Olympics in Tokyo, Japan, he placed 24th with a time of 54.05 seconds. Later in the year, at the 2021 Swimming World Cup stop in Doha, Qatar in October, and conducted in short course metres, he won gold medals in the 200 metre backstroke with a 1:52.09, in the 50 metre backstroke in a time of 23.13 seconds, in the 100 metre backstroke in 50.86 seconds, placed fifth in the 100 metre individual medley, and placed 12th in the 50 metre butterfly.

=== 2022 South Africa National Championships ===
At the South Africa National Swimming Championships in April 2022, Coetze swam a time of 53.96 seconds in the 100 metre backstroke in the prelims heats, achieving a qualifying time for both the 2022 Commonwealth Games and 2022 World Aquatics Championships before going on to win the gold medal and national title in the final. He achieved another qualifying time on the third day, this time in the 50 metre backstroke, winning the gold medal with a 24.74. Leading off the 4×50 metre freestyle relay on the fourth day, Coetze secured a qualification time in a third individual event, the 50 metre freestyle, with a time of 22.15 seconds. With a time of 22.34 seconds in the final of the 50 metre freestyle on day five, he won the national title and gold medal in the event, narrowly finishing ahead of Brad Tandy by less than two-tenths of a second. On the sixth and final day of competition, he attained a fourth qualification in a time trial, swimming a 1:56.92 in the 200 metre backstroke. He was named to the World Championships team in the 50 metre backstroke, 100 metre backstroke, and 200 metre backstroke. The following month, he was named to the 2022 Commonwealth Games swim team.

=== 2022 Commonwealth Games ===
Ranking first in the preliminaries of the 100 metre backstroke on day one of swimming at the 2022 Commonwealth Games, held starting in July in Birmingham, England, Coetze qualified for the semifinals of the event over half a second faster than second-ranked Brodie Williams of England with his time of 53.91 seconds. In the semifinals, he qualified for the final ranking first with a time of 53.67 seconds and was the only swimmer to finish the race in less than 54 seconds out of both semifinal heats. He won the gold medal in the final with a time of 53.78 seconds, marking the second gold medal for South Africa at the 2022 Commonwealth Games. In the preliminaries of the 50 metre backstroke the following morning, he was the only swimmer to achieve a time faster than 25 seconds, finishing in a time of 24.95 seconds and ranking first heading into the semifinals. Later in the same session, he placed sixteenth in the prelims heats of the 100 metre freestyle, qualifying for the semifinals before withdrawing from further competition in the event. He lowered his time by 0.14 seconds in the semifinals of the 50 metre backstroke to a 24.81, ranked first, and qualified for the event's final. In the final, he finished 0.12 seconds behind gold medalist Andrew Jeffcoat of New Zealand with a 24.77 to win the silver medal. Later in the same finals session, he anchored the 4×200 metre freestyle relay with a 1:49.86 to help achieve a sixth-place finish in 7:13.76.

On day five, Coetze ranked fourth in the preliminaries of the 200 metre backstroke, qualifying for the evening final with a time of 1:58.08. In the final, he swam a personal best time of 1:56.77 and won the bronze medal. Later in the session, he swam a personal best time of 53.42 seconds for the backstroke leg of the 4×100 metre mixed medley relay, to help finish fourth in an African record and South African record time of 3:44.38.

=== 2022 World Junior Championships ===
2022 World Junior Championships
Gold medal – first place	200 m backstroke	1:56.05 (CR)
Silver medal – second place	100 m backstroke	52.99
Silver medal – second place	50 m backstroke	24.61
Silver medal – second place	4×100 m medley	3:42.95
Bronze medal – third place	4×100 m mixed medley	3:58.58

On 28 June, Coetze was named to the official South Africa roster for the 2022 FINA World Junior Swimming Championships, held in August and September in Lima, Peru. On the morning of day one, he qualified for the semifinals of the 100 metre backstroke, ranking second with a time of 53.93 seconds in the preliminaries. Later in the prelims session, he led off the 4×100 metre freestyle relay with a personal best time of 49.75 to help qualify the relay to the final ranking seventh. In the evening session, he started by setting an African record, South African record, and Championships record with a personal best time of 52.95 seconds in the semifinals of the 100 metre backstroke to qualify for the final ranking first. For the final of the 4×100 metre freestyle relay, he equalled his lead-off time of 49.75 seconds from the preliminaries, helping achieve a sixth-place finish in 3:24.09. The following morning, in the preliminary heats of the 100 metre butterfly, he was disqualified for a 15 metre mark violation off of his start, that is, kicking underwater further than 15 metres after his dive. For the preliminaries of the 4×100 metre mixed medley relay, he helped advance the relay to the final ranking sixth, splitting a 53.94 for the backstroke leg of the relay and contributing to a time of 4:01.18. Later in the day, he won the silver medal in the 100 metre backstroke with a 52.99 and a bronze medal in the 4×100 metre mixed medley relay, splitting a 53.31 for the backstroke portion and contributing to the final mark of 3:58.58.

As the only competitor under 25 seconds in the preliminaries of the 50 metre backstroke on day three, Coetze qualified for the semifinals ranking first with a time of 24.95 seconds. For his second morning event, he swam a 49.85 for the lead-off leg of the 4×100 metre mixed freestyle relay, helping qualify for the final ranking fourth with a time of 3:36.82. In the evening, he ranked first in the semifinals of the 50 metre backstroke with a personal best time of 24.58 seconds, breaking the former Championships record of 24.63 established in 2017 by Michael Andrew of the United States, and advancing to the final. A little over 45 minutes later, he helped place seventh in the 4×100 metre mixed freestyle relay, leading off with a time of 49.88 to contribute to a final time of 3:37.32. The next day, he ranked fourth in the morning preliminaries of the 50 metre butterfly and qualified for the semifinals with a time of 24.36 seconds. Before the start of the evening session, he withdrew from the 50 metre butterfly; in the session itself, he won the silver medal in the 50 metre backstroke with a time of 24.61 seconds, finishing only behind Ksawery Masiuk of Poland.

In the preliminaries of his eighth event of the Championships, the 100 metre freestyle, on day five, Coetze tied for fourth rank overall with a time of 50.09, which was 1.42 seconds behind first-ranked Diogo Ribeiro of Portugal and qualified him for the semifinals. Before the start of the competition in the semifinals, he withdrew from the event. Starting the sixth and final day in his ninth event, he ranked second in the preliminaries of the 200 metre backstroke behind Hidekazu Takehara of Japan with a 2:01.69 and qualified for the final. Later in the morning, he split a 56.80 for the backstroke leg of the 4×100 metre medley relay, his tenth event, contributing to a time of 3:50.36, which qualified the relay to the final ranking eighth. In the evening final for the 200 metre backstroke, he won the gold medal with a personal best time of 1:56.05, which set a new Championships record in the event, lowering the record over six-tenths of a second from the former mark of 1:56.69 set in 2017 by Hugo González of Spain. Concluding his competition at the Championships, he split a 53.66 for the backstroke leg of the 4×100 metre medley relay in the final to help win the silver medal with a final time of 3:42.95.

=== 2022 World Short Course Championships ===
For his first event in the morning session on day one of the 2022 World Short Course Championships in Melbourne, Australia, Coetze ranked ninth in the preliminary heats of the 100 metre backstroke with a personal best time of 50.26 seconds and qualified for the semifinals. He finished in an African and South African record time of 49.85 seconds in the semifinals, which qualified him to the final ranking sixth. Improving the African record by 0.25 seconds to 49.60 seconds in the final, he placed fourth. In his first preliminary on day three, for the 50 metre backstroke, he achieved a personal best time of 23.01 seconds and qualified for the semifinals ranking third. In his second preliminary, he anchored the 4×50 metre freestyle relay with a 21.75 to help place twelfth with a time of 1:29.27. Swimming 0.15 seconds faster in the evening semifinals of the 50 metre backstroke, he achieved a new personal best time of 22.86 seconds and qualified for the final ranking fourth overall. The following morning, he placed fortieth in the 50 metre freestyle with a personal best time of 21.68 seconds. On the evening of day four, he set a new African record in the final of the 50 metre backstroke with a personal best time of 22.84 seconds, with which he took fifth place.

Coetze reiterated a sub-23 second performance in the 50 metre backstroke for the lead-off of the 4×50 metre medley relay, swimming the segment in 22.96 seconds to help place fourteenth with a time of 1:37.14. On the final morning of the competition, he placed tenth in the 200 metre backstroke, his sixth event, with a time of 1:51.51.

=== 2023 ===
On the first morning of competition at the 2023 South Africa National Championships, held in Gqeberha in April, Coetze achieved a time of 53.18 seconds in the preliminaries of the 100 metre backstroke, which marked a qualifying time for the evening final and the 2023 World Aquatics Championships. He improved upon his qualifying time in the evening final, winning the gold medal with a personal best time of 52.78 seconds that broke his African and South African records in the event. The following morning, he swam a personal best time of 24.52 seconds in the preliminaries of the 50 metre backstroke, qualifying for the evening final. Later in the day, he won the gold medal in the 50 metre backstroke with a personal best and World Championships qualifying time of 24.36 seconds and a gold medal in the 4×100 metre mixed freestyle relay with a relay time of 3:31.62. In the evening finals session on day three, he won the silver medal in the 100 metre freestyle with a personal best time of 49.19 seconds, finishing behind gold medalist Chad le Clos and ahead of bronze medalist Matthew Sates. He won the gold medal in the 50 metre freestyle on day four with a time of 22.30 seconds in the final after a first-ranked final-qualifying time of 22.18 seconds in the preliminaries.

On the fifth and final day, Coetze achieved a time of 24.28 seconds in the 50 metre butterfly preliminaries before withdrawing from further competition in the event. In the evening, he won the gold medal and national title in the 200 metre backstroke with a World Championships qualifying time of 1:56.66.

2026

At the 2026 Commonwealth Games in Glasgow, Coetze won gold medals in all three men's backstroke events: 50, 100 and 200 metres. He won the 200 metre backstroke in a Games-record time of 1:54.22.

Coetze’s 50 and 200 metre victories were reported during the Games, and his later 100 metre victory completed the three-title backstroke sweep

== International championships (50 m) ==
Meet	100 free	50 back	100 back	200 back	50 fly	100 fly	4×100 free	4×200 free	4×100 medley	4×100 mixed free	4×100 mixed medley
Junior level
WJC 2019		9th	27th	29th					10th		15th
WJC 2022	4th (h,WD)	2nd place, silver medalist(s)	2nd place, silver medalist(s)	1st place, gold medalist(s)	4th (h,WD)	DSQ	6th		2nd place, silver medalist(s)	7th	3rd place, bronze medalist(s)
Senior level
OG 2020		—N/a	24th		—N/a						
OG 2024		—N/a	5th	7th		—N/a				—N/a	
CG 2022	16th (h,WD)	2nd place, silver medalist(s)	1st place, gold medalist(s)	3rd place, bronze medalist(s)				6th			4th

== International championships (25 m) ==
Meet	50 free	50 back	100 back	200 back	4×50 free	4×50 medley
WC 2022	40th	5th	4th	10th	12th	14th

== Personal best times ==
=== Long course metres (50 m pool) ===
Event	Time		Meet	Location	Date	Notes	Ref
50 m freestyle	22.15	r	2022 South Africa National Championships	Gqeberha	9 April 2022		
100 m freestyle	49.19		2023 South Africa National Championships	Gqeberha	14 April 2023		
50 m backstroke	24.36		2023 South Africa National Championships	Gqeberha	13 April 2023		
100 m backstroke	52.63		2024 Summer Olympic Games	France	28 July 2024	AF, NR	
200 m backstroke	1:55.99		2024 World Championships	Doha, Qatar	16 February 2024		
50 m butterfly	24.14		2022 South Africa National Championships	Gqeberha	6 April 2022		

Legend: AF – African record; NR – South African record; e – equalled existing record;
Records not set in finals: h – heat; sf – semifinal; r – relay 1st leg; rh – relay heat 1st leg; b – B final; † – en route to final mark; so – swim-off; tt – time trial

=== Short course metres (25 m pool) ===
Event	Time		Meet	Location	Date	Notes	Ref
50 m freestyle	21.68	h	2022 World Short Course Championships	Melbourne, Australia	16 December 2022		
100 m freestyle	48.56		2021 South Africa Short Course Championships	Pietermaritzburg	19 September 2021		
50 m backstroke	22.84		2022 World Short Course Championships	Melbourne, Australia	16 December 2022	AF, NR	
100 m backstroke	49.60		2022 World Short Course Championships	Melbourne, Australia	14 December 2022	AF, NR	
200 m backstroke	1:51.36		2022 South Africa Short Course Championships	Pietermaritzburg	11 August 2022		

Legend: AF – African record; NR – South African record; e – equalled existing record;
Records not set in finals: h – heat; sf – semifinal; r – relay 1st leg; rh – relay heat 1st leg; b – B final; † – en route to final mark; so – swim-off; tt – time trial

== Swimming World Cup circuits ==
The following medals Coetze has won at Swimming World Cup circuits.

Edition	Gold medals	Silver medals	Bronze medals	Total
2021	3	0	0	3
Total	3	0	0	3

== Continental and national records ==
=== Long course metres (50 m pool) ===
No.	Event	Time		Meet	Location	Date	Type	Status	Ref
1	4×100 m mixed medley	3:44.38		2022 Commonwealth Games	Birmingham, England	2 August 2022	AF, NR	Current	
2	100 m backstroke	52.95	sf	2022 World Junior Championships	Lima, Peru	30 August 2022	AF, NR	Former	
3	100 m backstroke (2)	52.63		2024 Summer Olympic Games	France	28 July 2024	AF, NR	Current	

Legend: AF – African record; NR – South African record; e – equalled existing record;
Records not set in finals: h – heat; sf – semifinal; r – relay 1st leg; rh – relay heat 1st leg; b – B final; † – en route to final mark; so – swim-off; tt – time trial

=== Short course metres (25 m pool) ===
No.	Event	Time		Meet	Location	Date	Type	Status	Ref
1	100 m backstroke	49.85	sf	2022 World Short Course Championships	Melbourne, Australia	13 December 2022	AF, NR	Former	
2	100 m backstroke (2)	49.60		2022 World Short Course Championships	Melbourne, Australia	14 December 2022	AF, NR	Current	
3	50 m backstroke	22.84		2022 World Short Course Championships	Melbourne, Australia	16 December 2022	AF, NR	Current	

Legend: AF – African record; NR – South African record; e – equalled existing record;
Records not set in finals: h – heat; sf – semifinal; r – relay 1st leg; rh – relay heat 1st leg; b – B final; † – en route to final mark; so – swim-off; tt – time trial

== Awards and honours ==
- SA Sports Award, Sportsman of the Year: 2022

Awards
Preceded by Ahmed Hafnaoui	African Swimmer of the Year; 2022	Succeeded by Ahmed Hafnaoui
