= 2022 FINA Swimming World Cup =

The 2022 FINA Swimming World Cup was a series of three three-day meets in three cities in October and November 2022. This edition was held in the short course (25-meter pool) format.

== Meets ==
The 2022 World Cup consisted of the following three meets.

Meet	Dates	Location	Venue	Results
1	21–23 October	Berlin, Germany	SSE (in German)	
2	28–30 October	Toronto, Canada	Toronto Pan Am Sports Centre	
3	3–5 November	Indianapolis, United States	Indiana University Natatorium	

== World Cup standings ==
=== Men ===
Rank	Name	Nationality	Points awarded			Total
Rank	Name	Nationality	(Germany)	(Canada)	(United States)	Total
1	Dylan Carter	Trinidad and Tobago	57.3	57.2	58.1	172.6
2	Nic Fink	United States	57.0	57.5	57.8	172.3
3	Chad le Clos	South Africa	56.4	53.8	56.1	166.3
4	Shaine Casas	United States	48.9	58.5	57.5	164.9
5	Matthew Sates	South Africa	58.3	52.7	43.1	154.1
6	Kyle Chalmers	Australia	53.4	48.0	50.7	152.1
7	Thomas Ceccon	Italy	52.6	48.6	43.6	144.8
8	Danas Rapšys	Lithuania	43.7	42.0	51.4	137.1

=== Women ===
Rank	Name	Nationality	Points awarded			Total
Rank	Name	Nationality	(Germany)	(Canada)	(United States)	Total
1	Beata Nelson	United States	57.3	58.3	58.1	173.7
2	Siobhán Haughey	Hong Kong	58.5	54.4	53.0	165.9
3	Béryl Gastaldello	France	52.1	53.2	51.3	156.6
4	Kylie Masse	Canada	53.1	51.6	47.6	152.3
5	Rūta Meilutytė	Lithuania	52.2	49.6	50.1	151.9
6	Louise Hansson	Sweden	47.3	46.9	53.6	147.8
7	Madison Wilson	Australia	47.5	44.0	47.6	139.1
8	Ingrid Wilm	Canada	46.8	44.2	45.3	136.3

== Event winners ==
=== 50 m freestyle ===
Meet	Men			Women		
Meet	Winner	Nationality	Time	Winner	Nationality	Time
Berlin	Dylan Carter	Trinidad and Tobago	20.77	Katarzyna Wasick	Poland	23.32
Toronto	Dylan Carter	Trinidad and Tobago	20.91	Katarzyna Wasick	Poland	23.27
Indianapolis	Dylan Carter	Trinidad and Tobago	20.72	Katarzyna Wasick	Poland	23.10

=== 100 m freestyle ===
Meet	Men			Women		
Meet	Winner	Nationality	Time	Winner	Nationality	Time
Berlin	Kyle Chalmers	Australia	45.88	Siobhán Haughey	Hong Kong	51.59
Toronto	Kyle Chalmers	Australia	45.52	Siobhán Haughey	Hong Kong	51.33
Indianapolis	Kyle Chalmers	Australia	45.55	Siobhán Haughey	Hong Kong	51.00

=== 200 m freestyle ===
Meet	Men			Women		
Meet	Winner	Nationality	Time	Winner	Nationality	Time
Berlin	Matthew Sates	South Africa	1:40.88	Siobhán Haughey	Hong Kong	1:51.36
Toronto	Brooks Curry	United States	1:42.32	Siobhán Haughey	Hong Kong	1:51.13
Indianapolis	Kieran Smith	United States	1:41.78	Siobhán Haughey	Hong Kong	1:51.19

=== 400 m freestyle ===
Meet	Men			Women		
Meet	Winner	Nationality	Time	Winner	Nationality	Time
Berlin	Matthew Sates	South Africa	3:36.30	Siobhán Haughey	Hong Kong	3:56.52
Toronto	Matthew Sates	South Africa	3:37.52	Summer McIntosh	Canada	3:52.80; WC, WJ
Indianapolis	Kieran Smith	United States	3:35.99	Katie Ledecky	United States	3:54.04

=== 800 m freestyle ===
Meet	Men			Women		
Meet	Winner	Nationality	Time	Winner	Nationality	Time
Berlin				Isabel Marie Gose	Germany	8:14.88
Toronto	Marwan Elkamash	Egypt	7:45.09			
Indianapolis				Katie Ledecky	United States	7:57.42 WR

=== 1500 m freestyle ===
Meet	Men			Women		
Meet	Winner	Nationality	Time	Winner	Nationality	Time
Berlin	Florian Wellbrock	Germany	14:25.41			
Toronto				Katie Ledecky	United States	15:08.24 WR
Indianapolis	Bobby Finke	United States	14:45.77			

=== 50 m backstroke ===
Meet	Men			Women		
Meet	Winner	Nationality	Time	Winner	Nationality	Time
Berlin	Dylan Carter	Trinidad and Tobago	23.15	Kylie Masse	Canada	26.15
Toronto	Dylan Carter	Trinidad and Tobago	22.94	Maggie Mac Neil	Canada	25.96
Indianapolis	Dylan Carter	Trinidad and Tobago	22.72	Kylie Masse	Canada	25.96

=== 100 m backstroke ===
Meet	Men			Women		
Meet	Winner	Nationality	Time	Winner	Nationality	Time
Berlin	Shaine Casas	United States	49.54	Beata Nelson	United States	56.03
Toronto	Shaine Casas	United States	48.84 WC	Beata Nelson	United States	55.75
Indianapolis	Shaine Casas	United States	49.40	Bella Sims	United States	55.75 WJ

=== 200 m backstroke ===
Meet	Men			Women		
Meet	Winner	Nationality	Time	Winner	Nationality	Time
Berlin	Shaine Casas	United States	1:50.02	Beata Nelson	United States	2:02.59
Toronto	Shaine Casas	United States	1:48.99	Beata Nelson	United States	2:00.50
Indianapolis	Shaine Casas	United States	1:48.40	Beata Nelson	United States	2:00.43

=== 50 m breaststroke ===
Meet	Men			Women		
Meet	Winner	Nationality	Time	Winner	Nationality	Time
Berlin	Nic Fink	United States	25.86	Rūta Meilutytė	Lithuania	28.60
Toronto	Nic Fink	United States	25.78	Rūta Meilutytė	Lithuania	28.96
Indianapolis	Nic Fink	United States	25.83	Rūta Meilutytė	Lithuania	28.70

=== 100 m breaststroke ===
Meet	Men			Women		
Meet	Winner	Nationality	Time	Winner	Nationality	Time
Berlin	Nic Fink	United States	56.43	Rūta Meilutytė	Lithuania	1:03.07
Toronto	Nic Fink	United States	56.39	Rūta Meilutytė	Lithuania	1:02.95
Indianapolis	Nic Fink	United States	56.15	Rūta Meilutytė	Lithuania	1:02.77

=== 200 m breaststroke ===
Meet	Men			Women		
Meet	Winner	Nationality	Time	Winner	Nationality	Time
Berlin	Nic Fink	United States	2:05.74	Tes Schouten	Netherlands	2:19.55
Toronto	Nic Fink	United States	2:03.78	Lilly King	United States	2:18.43
Indianapolis	Nic Fink	United States	2:02.70	Lilly King	United States	2:17.56

=== 50 m butterfly ===
Meet	Men			Women		
Meet	Winner	Nationality	Time	Winner	Nationality	Time
Berlin	Dylan Carter	Trinidad and Tobago	22.13	Béryl Gastaldello	France	25.16
Toronto	Dylan Carter	Trinidad and Tobago	22.28	Maggie Mac Neil	Canada	24.75
Indianapolis	Dylan Carter	Trinidad and Tobago	21.99	Louise Hansson	Sweden	25.16

=== 100 m butterfly ===
Meet	Men			Women		
Meet	Winner	Nationality	Time	Winner	Nationality	Time
Berlin	Chad le Clos	South Africa	48.58	Louise Hansson	Sweden	55.33
Toronto	Chad le Clos	South Africa	48.88	Maggie Mac Neil	Canada	54.78 WC
Indianapolis	Chad le Clos	South Africa	48.85	Louise Hansson	Sweden	55.45

=== 200 m butterfly ===
Meet	Men			Women		
Meet	Winner	Nationality	Time	Winner	Nationality	Time
Berlin	Chad le Clos	South Africa	1:49.62	Ilaria Cusinato	Italy	2:05.30
Toronto	Trenton Julian	United States	1:49.69	Kelly Pash	United States	2:03.61
Indianapolis	Chad le Clos	South Africa	1:49.89	Summer McIntosh	Canada	2:03.40

=== 100 m individual medley ===
Meet	Men			Women		
Meet	Winner	Nationality	Time	Winner	Nationality	Time
Berlin	Thomas Ceccon	Italy	51.52	Béryl Gastaldello	France	57.76
Toronto	Shaine Casas	United States	51.03	Béryl Gastaldello	France	57.97
Indianapolis	Shaine Casas	United States	51.04	Beata Nelson	United States	57.81

=== 200 m individual medley ===
Meet	Men			Women		
Meet	Winner	Nationality	Time	Winner	Nationality	Time
Berlin	Matthew Sates	South Africa	1:51.64	Beata Nelson	United States	2:06.80
Toronto	Shaine Casas	United States	1:50.37 WC	Beata Nelson	United States	2:05.08
Indianapolis	Kieran Smith	United States	1:52.98	Beata Nelson	United States	2:04.92

=== 400 m individual medley ===
Meet	Men			Women		
Meet	Winner	Nationality	Time	Winner	Nationality	Time
Berlin	Matthew Sates	South Africa	4:02.95	Hali Flickinger	United States	4:30.36
Toronto	Matthew Sates	South Africa	4:02.65	Summer McIntosh	Canada	4:21.49 WJ
Indianapolis	Matthew Sates	South Africa	4:04.12	Sydney Pickrem	Canada	4:26.66
