= Shaine Casas =

American swimmer (born 1999)

Personal information
- National team: United States
- Born: December 25, 1999 (age 26) San Diego, California, U.S.
- Height: 6 ft 4 in (193 cm)

Sport
- Sport: Swimming
- Strokes: Backstroke, butterfly, freestyle, individual medley
- Club: Aggie Swim Club (former); Texas A&M University (former); University of Texas (current)
- College team: Texas A&M (2018–2021)
- Coach: Bob Bowman
Medal record
Men's swimming
Representing United States
Event	1st	2nd	3rd
World Championships (LC)	1	1	4
World Championships (SC)	5	7	3
Total	6	8	7
World Championships (LC)
Gold medal – first place	2024 Doha	4×100 m medley
Silver medal – second place	2025 Singapore	200 m medley
Bronze medal – third place	2022 Budapest	200 m backstroke
Bronze medal – third place	2024 Doha	4×100 m freestyle
Bronze medal – third place	2024 Doha	4×200 m freestyle
Bronze medal – third place	2025 Singapore	4×100 m freestyle
World Championships (SC)
Gold medal – first place	2021 Abu Dhabi	100 m backstroke
Gold medal – first place	2021 Abu Dhabi	4×50 m medley
Gold medal – first place	2022 Melbourne	4×50 m mixed medley
Gold medal – first place	2024 Budapest	200 m medley
Gold medal – first place	2024 Budapest	4×200 m freestyle
Silver medal – second place	2021 Abu Dhabi	200 m backstroke
Silver medal – second place	2021 Abu Dhabi	4×100 m medley
Silver medal – second place	2021 Abu Dhabi	4×50 m mixed medley
Silver medal – second place	2022 Melbourne	200 m backstroke
Silver medal – second place	2022 Melbourne	4×50 m medley
Silver medal – second place	2024 Budapest	4×100 m medley
Silver medal – second place	2024 Budapest	4×100 m mixed medley
Bronze medal – third place	2021 Abu Dhabi	4×100 m freestyle
Bronze medal – third place	2022 Melbourne	4×100 m freestyle
Bronze medal – third place	2024 Budapest	4×50 m mixed medley

Shaine Casas (/ʃeɪn ˈkɑːsəs/ shayn KAH-səss; born December 25, 1999) is an American professional swimmer. He is an Americas record holder in the short course 4×50 meter medley relay, swimming the butterfly leg of the relay. At the 2021 World Short Course Championships, he won the gold medal in the 100-meter backstroke, a silver medal in the 200-meter backstroke, and placed seventh in the 50-meter backstroke. In 2022, at the year's World Aquatics Championships (long course), he won the bronze medal in the 200-metre backstroke. Later in the year, at the 2022 World Short Course Championships, he won the silver medal in the 200-metre backstroke and placed fourth in the finals of the 100-meter individual medley and 200-meter individual medley.

== Background ==
Casas was born in San Diego, California, on December 25, 1999. His mother is Monica Epling. When he was 7 years old he began swimming competitively. He attended McAllen High School in McAllen, Texas, where he swam for his high school team and was the 6A State champion in the 200-yard individual medley and 100-yard butterfly in 2017. He graduated from McAllen High School in 2018. Later in 2018, Casas started competing collegiately for Texas A&M University where he competed through 2021 before transferring to the University of Texas in 2022.

== 2019–2021 ==
=== 2019 National Championships ===
2019 National Championships
Gold medal – first place	100 m backstroke	52.72
Silver medal – second place	200 m backstroke	1:55.79
Silver medal – second place	200 m individual medley	1:58.83

At the 2019 National Championships, an international swimming competition held July to August 2019 in Stanford, California, Casas won the national title in the 100-meter backstroke. His time of 52.72 made him the fifth fastest swimmer in the event globally for the year, and the seventh fastest American in the event in history.

In the 200-meter individual medley Casas took second place, finishing 1.07 seconds behind 12 time Olympic medalist Ryan Lochte. Casas also finished in second place in the 200-meter backstroke. Swimming the anchoring leg of the 4x200-meter freestyle relay, Casas took third place with his relay teammates Steven Richardson, Mark Theall, and Adam Koster. Casas' swims in the 100-meter backstroke, 200-meter backstroke, and 200-meter individual medley were all qualifying times for the 2020 US Olympic Trials. Additionally, his times from the National Championships earned him spots on the 2019—2020 and 2020—2021 US National Teams in the 100-meter backstroke and 200-meter backstroke events.

=== 2020 ===
In June 2020, Casas was diagnosed with COVID-19. Five months later, he swam a 43.87 in the 100-yard backstroke at the 2020 Art Adamson Invitational becoming the all-time third fastest person to swim the event. A little over a week earlier, Casas swam the unofficial fastest time swum by an American swimmer in history in the 100-yard individual medley with a time of 46.33 seconds at an intrasquad meet hosted by Texas A&M. His start to the 2020−2021 swim season in late 2020 along with his performances before competition shutdowns related to the COVID-19 pandemic in 2020 earned him the Swammy Award for "NCAA Male Swimmer of the Year".

=== 2021: International debut ===
==== 2021 NCAA Championships ====
2021 NCAA Championships
Gold medal – first place	200 yd individual medley	1:39.53
Gold medal – first place	100 yd backstroke	44.20
Gold medal – first place	200 yd backstroke	1:35.75
Bronze medal – third place	4x200 yd freestyle relay	6:10.79

At the 2021 NCAA Division I Men's Swimming Championships in Greensboro, North Carolina, in March 2021, Casas won three individual events, the 200-yard individual medley, 100-yard backstroke, and 200-yard backstroke. His first individual title of the meet in the 200-yard individual medley was the first men's NCAA individual title won by a swimmer for Texas A&M. He also took third place with his relay teammates in the 4x200-yard freestyle relay. In his other events Casas placed fifth in the 4x50-yard freestyle relay, ninth in the 4x50-yard medley relay, and 13th in the 4x100-yard medley relay.

Casas was chosen as the SEC Male Swimmer of the Year by the Southeastern Conference, a first for Texas A&M Aggies. For the 2020—2021 collegiate swimming season, he was also the first swimmer for Texas A&M to receive the CSCAA Division-I Men's Swimmer of the Year award.

==== 2020 US Olympic Trials ====
Casas qualified to compete in the 2020 USA Swimming Olympic Trials, the meet determining US Olympic swim team members for the 2020 Summer Olympics, in a total of seven events, the same number as Caeleb Dressel and Katie Ledecky. Casas qualified in the 50-meter freestyle, 100-meter freestyle, 200-meter freestyle, 100-meter backstroke, 200-meter backstroke, 100-meter butterfly, and 200-meter individual medley. The 2020 Olympic Trials were his first US Olympic Trials. Leading up to the Olympic Trials, where the top two finishers qualified for the 2020 Olympic Games, Casas was one of the top two picks for Sports Illustrated in both the 100-meter backstroke and 200-meter backstroke. He was also chosen by NBC Sports as one of their top two picks for the 200-meter backstroke based on 2021 performances from U.S. swimmers in the race.

At the US Olympic Trials held in Omaha, Nebraska, and postponed to June 2021 due to the COVID-19 pandemic, Casas competed in two events. In the 100-meter backstroke he swam a 52.76 in the final, finished in third place behind Ryan Murphy and Hunter Armstrong, and did not make the 2020 US Olympic team in the event. In his second event, the 200-meter backstroke, he finished in sixth place in the final with a time of 1:57.64 and did not qualify for the US Olympic team.

==== 2021 Texas Senior Circuit ====
Less than a week after the end of the 2020 US Olympic Trials, Casas swam personal best times in the 100-meter freestyle and 100-meter butterfly at the 2021 Texas Senior Circuit long course meet in College Station, Texas. He swam a 48.91 in the 100-meter freestyle and a 51.22 in the 100-meter butterfly. His time in the 100-meter butterfly made him the all-time ninth fastest American swimmer in the event. His swims throughout the 2021 year to September qualified him for the 2021—2022 US National Team in three individual events, the 100-meter butterfly, 100-meter backstroke, and 200-meter backstroke.

==== Post-Olympic Trials upheaval ====
Following his performance at the 2020 Olympic Trials and dropping time at the Texas Senior Circuit, Casas decided to enter the NCAA transfer portal in August as he was unsure of if he wanted to continue competing collegiately with the Texas A&M Aggies. In September, Casas revealed he was also considering turning professional. On October 21, he announced an intermediate step in his decision making, remaining at Texas A&M to train with the professional group of swimmers as he prepared for the 2021 Short Course World Championships. As part of his racing preparation for the World Championships, Casas swam a time of 19.51 seconds in the 50-yard freestyle and a 1:42.96 in the 200-yard individual medley on the first day, November 17, of the 2021 Art Adamson Invitational, choosing to compete in exhibition unattached to any school. Later during the invitational, Casas swam a 1:39.95 in the 200-yard individual medley in a time trial, making him the first swimmer in American history to swim the event faster than 1:40.00 five or more times.

==== 2021 World Short Course Championships ====
2021 World Championships (SC)
Gold medal – first place	100 m backstroke	49.23
Gold medal – first place	4×50 m medley	1:30.51 (CR, AM)
Silver medal – second place	4×50 m mixed medley	1:37.04
Silver medal – second place	200 m backstroke	1:48.81
Silver medal – second place	4×100 m medley	3:20.50
Bronze medal – third place	4×100 m freestyle	3:05.42

Casas entered to compete in all the individual backstroke events, 50-meter, 100-meter, and 200-meter distances, at the 2021 World Short Course Championships in Abu Dhabi, United Arab Emirates in December. For his eight individual and relay events, Casas reached the final in all eight events and medalled in six events.

On the first day of competition, Casas tied Lorenzo Mora of Italy with a 50.40 in the same prelims heat of the 100-meter backstroke and both swimmers qualified for the semifinals ranked third overall. In the semifinals, Casas tied Kliment Kolesnikov of Russia in ranking first with each swimmer posting a time of 49.57 seconds in their semifinal heat. The same day, Casas swum the lead-off leg of the 4×100-meter freestyle relay in the prelims heats, splitting a 46.93 and helping advance the relay to final ranking second. On the finals relay, he split a 46.50 for the third leg, helping achieve a time of 3:05.42 with his finals relay teammates Ryan Held, Hunter Tapp, and Zach Apple, and win the bronze medal in the event. The second day, Casas won the gold medal in the final of the 100-meter backstroke with a time of 49.23 seconds, finishing over two-tenths of a second ahead of silver medalist Kliment Kolesnikov. Casas' win was his first world championships gold medal and first world title.

In the morning prelims session on day three, Casas qualified for the semifinals of the 50-meter backstroke ranking third with a 23.23, less than one-tenth of a second behind second-ranked Gabriel Fantoni of Brazil. Casas led-off the 4×50-meter mixed medley relay with a time of 23.15 seconds, contributing to a relay time of 1:37.74 and a ranking of first overall that qualified the relay to the final. For his first race of the evening session, Casas tied Lorenzo Mora for fourth rank in the semifinals of the 50-meter backstroke with a time of 23.13 seconds and qualified for the final. In his second and final race of the evening, Casas split a 23.16 on the lead-off leg of the 4×50 meter mixed medley relay to help win the silver medal in 1:37.04. In the final of the 50-meter backstroke, Casas swam a personal best time of 22.99 seconds in lane two and placed seventh overall, finishing nine-hundredths of a second behind silver medalists in the event Christian Diener of Germany and Lorenzo Mora. For the 4×50-metre freestyle relay, held in the same session as the final of the 50-meter backstroke on day four, Casas split a 20.73 for the second leg of the relay and contributed to the relay's fourth-place time of 1:23.81.

Day five, Casas split a 23.34 for the backstroke leg of the 4×50-meter medley relay, helping qualify the relay to the final ranking fourth with a time of 1:33.29. On the finals relay, Casas split a 23.11 to help tie the Championships record and Americas record and set a new American record with a time of 1:30.51, which tied the Russia relay team for the Championships record and a gold medal. The sixth and final day, Casas swam a personal best time of 1:49.82 in the 200-meter backstroke prelims heats, ranked first, and qualified for the final. In his first event of the evening, Casas lowered his time in the 200-meter backstroke to a 1:48.81, which earned him the silver medal. Finishing his competition at the championships, Casas split a 50.44 for the backstroke leg of the 4×100-meter medley relay to help finish less than one second behind the Italy relay team, place second, and win the silver medal.

== 2022 ==
On January 6, 2022, Casas officially transferred to the University of Texas from Texas A&M University and started training with the Texas Longhorns swim team. At his first meet with the University of Texas, the 2021 Eddie Reese Invite, Casas swam a 19.28 in the 50-yard freestyle, a 1:11.0 in the 150-yard backstroke, and a 1:12.0 in the 150-yard butterfly. At the 2022 Pro Swim Series stop in Westmont, Illinois, in early March, Casas won the 100-meter freestyle with a time of 49.29 seconds on the second day of competition, finishing 0.08 seconds ahead of second-place finisher Maxime Rooney. The following day, he placed second in the 200-meter backstroke, behind Ryan Murphy, in 1:58.09 and second in the 100-meter butterfly, behind Michael Andrew, with a 51.77. On the fourth and final day, he false started in the preliminary heats of the 50-meter freestyle before going on to place second in the 100-meter backstroke final with a time of 53.28 seconds.

=== Pro Swim Series – San Antonio ===
At the 2022 Pro Swim Series in San Antonio, Texas, at the Northside Swim Center, Casas swam a personal best time of 51.14 seconds in the prelims heats of the 100-meter butterfly, qualifying for the final ranking first. He won the final with another personal best time, 51.09 seconds, finishing 0.70 seconds ahead of second-place finisher Caeleb Dressel and 0.84 seconds ahead of third-place finisher Coleman Stewart. In the 100-meter backstroke prelims the following morning, he qualified for the final ranking first with a time of 55.35 seconds. He swam a 53.54 in the final to place first, finishing less than one second ahead of second-place finisher Coleman Stewart. On day four, he swam a 1:59.86 in the prelims heats of the 200-meter individual medley to advance to the final ranking third with his time being 0.79 seconds faster than fourth-ranked Chase Kalisz. He won the final with a personal best time of 1:56.70, finishing a quarter of a second ahead of second-place finisher Léon Marchand. His time of 1:56.70 ranked as number one in the world for the 2022 year up through the time of his swim.

=== 2022 International Team Trials ===
The second day of the 2022 US International Team Trials in Greensboro, North Carolina, Casas ranked first in the prelims heats of the 200-meter backstroke with a personal best time of 1:55.57, qualifying for the evening final. In the final, he placed second with a personal best time of 1:55.46, finishing less than half a second behind the first-place finisher. Day three, he qualified for the final of the 100-meter butterfly ranking sixth with a time of 51.75 seconds and the final of the 50-meter backstroke ranking third with a personal best time of 24.45 seconds from the morning prelims heats. In the evening finals session, he did not swim the 100-meter butterfly and he placed third in the 50-meter backstroke with a personal best time of 24.00 seconds. For his fourth event, the 100-meter backstroke on day four, Casas ranked third in the prelims heats with a time of 53.31 seconds, qualifying for the evening final. He placed fourth in the final, finishing in 53.01 seconds. From his performances, he earned a spot on his first long course World Championships team, the 2022 World Aquatics Championships team, in the 200-meter backstroke.

=== 2022 World Aquatics Championships ===
2022 World Championships (LC)
Bronze medal – third place	200 m backstroke	1:55.35

In the preliminaries of the 200-metre backstroke on day five of pool swimming competition at the 2022 World Aquatics Championships in Budapest, Hungary in June, Casas was one of three men to swim under 1:57.00, advancing to the semifinals ranking first with his time of 1:56.66. In the semifinals, he went out faster than in the prelims, lowering the first half of his 200 meters to a time of 55.94 seconds, and came back slower to finish in 1:56.90 and qualify for the final ranking sixth. He swam a personal best time of 1:55.35 in the final to win the bronze medal, finishing 0.19 seconds behind silver medalist Luke Greenbank of Great Britain.

=== 2022 National Championships ===
2022 National Championships
Gold medal – first place	100 m butterfly	50.40
Gold medal – first place	200 m individual medley	1:55.24
Bronze medal – third place	100 m freestyle	48.46

The following month, Casas competed at the 2022 Speedo Southern Sectionals held in Austin, Texas, winning the 100-meter freestyle with a personal best time of 48.23 seconds, the 100-meter backstroke with a personal best time of 52.51 seconds, and the 100-meter butterfly with a personal best time of 50.56 seconds. In July, he was announced as a roster member for the 2022 Duel in the Pool to be held in August. Nine days later, he won the national title in the 100-meter butterfly at the 2022 US National Championships with a personal best time of 50.40 seconds. Two days after that, he won the national title in the 200-meter individual medley with a personal best time of 1:55.24. Earlier in the Championships, two days before the 100-meter butterfly win, he won the bronze medal in the 100-metre freestyle with a time of 48.46 seconds, finishing just 0.02 seconds behind the two swimmers who tied for the gold medal, Zach Apple and Matt King.

=== 2022 Swimming World Cup ===
At the 2022 Swimming World Cup stop in Berlin, Germany, his first FINA Swimming World Cup, Casas won two gold medals, the first in the 200-meter backstroke with a time of 1:50.02 and the second in the 100-meter backstroke with a 49.54, which was less than one-tenth of a second faster than silver medalist Thomas Ceccon of Italy. Across all of the events he competed in for the first stop, including those he did not medal in, he ranked seventh amongst all male competitors with a score of 48.9 points.

On the first day of competition at the stop in Toronto, Canada, Casas won the gold medal in the 200-meter backstroke with a 1:48.99, which neared his personal best time of 1:48.81. Approximately 55 minutes later in the evening, he won a gold medal in the 100-meter individual medley with a personal best time of 51.03 seconds. The next day, he won the 200-meter individual medley with a World Cup record time of 1:50.37, which was 0.74 seconds slower than the world record of 1:49.63 set by Ryan Lochte in 2012. For the final day, he won the gold medal in the 100-meter backstroke with a World Cup record and personal best time of 48.84 seconds.

For the 200-meter backstroke on day one at the third stop, in Indianapolis in November, Casas won the gold medal with a US Open record and personal best time of 1:48.40, breaking the former record of 1:48.81 set by Ryan Murphy in 2019. About an hour later, he set a US Open record in the 100-meter individual medley as well, winning the gold medal in a time of 51.04 seconds. Concluding his events on day three of three with the 100 meter backstroke, he won the gold medal with a time of 49.40 seconds, which was 0.23 seconds faster than silver medalist Kacper Stokowski of Poland. By the end of World Cup competition he brought his score up to 164.9 points, ranking fourth overall amongst male competitors.

=== 2022 World Short Course Championships ===
2022 World Championships (SC)
Gold medal – first place	4×50 m mixed medley	1:35.15 (h)
Silver medal – second place	4×50 m medley	1:30.37 (AM)
Silver medal – second place	200 m backstroke	1:48.01
Bronze medal – third place	4×100 m freestyle	3:05.09

Two days before the start of the 2022 FINA Swimming World Cup in Berlin, Germany, Casas was publicly announced to the roster for the 2022 World Short Course Championships, in December in Melbourne, Australia, in four individual events, the 200-meter backstroke, 50-meter butterfly, 100-meter butterfly, and 200-meter individual medley, however, in December and less than two weeks before the start of competition, he was removed from the roster in the 50-meter butterfly and added in the 100-meter individual medley.

For his first final of the Championships, the 200-meter individual medley on day one, Casas placed fourth with a time of 1:51.31. Approximately 80 minutes later, he won a bronze medal in the 4×100-meter freestyle relay, splitting a 45.90 for the second leg of the relay to contribute to the final time of 3:05.09. The following day, he swam a 22.98 for the backstroke portion of the 4×50-meter mixed medley relay in the preliminaries to help qualify it for the final with a time of 1:36.83 and overall first rank. On the finals relay, Ryan Murphy substituted in for him and he won a gold medal for his efforts when the final relay placed first in 1:35.15.

In his second relay preliminary, the 4×50-meter freestyle relay on day three, Casas anchored the relay with a 20.84 to a second-rank and final-qualifying time of 1:24.07. Trimming his time by one-hundredth of a second to a 20.83 in the final for the second leg of the relay, he helped place fifth in 1:24.03. For his fourth relay event and third relay preliminary, the 4×50-meter mixed freestyle relay on day four, he helped rank fourth in the morning with a time of 1:29.97, which qualified the relay to the evening final. The finals relay, on which he was substituted out, placed fourth in a time of 1:29.18. Later in the session, he achieved a fourth-place finish in the 100-meter individual medley with a time of 51.36 seconds. On the fifth day, he helped set an Americas record in the final of the 4×50-meter medley relay and win the silver medal in 1:30.37, contributing a 22.13 for the butterfly portion of the relay. In his final event, the 200-meter backstroke on day six of six, he won the silver medal with a personal best time of 1:48.01, finishing less than half a second ahead of bronze medalist Lorenzo Mora and over half of one second behind gold medalist Ryan Murphy.

== 2023 ==
At the 2023 TYR Pro Swim Series in Fort Lauderdale, Florida, Casas won the 100-meter butterfly with a time of 50.80 seconds, tying the Pro Swim Series record set by Michael Andrew in 2021. He also achieved a personal best time in the 200 meter freestyle the day before with a 1:47.88, tying Luiz Altamir of Brazil for third-place.

== 2024 ==
U.S. Olympic Trials: Casas earned his spot on the U.S. Olympic team by finishing second in the 200m IM at the U.S. Olympic Trials with a time of 1:55.83, behind teammate Carson Foster.

2024 Paris Olympic: Casas swam 200m IM in 1:57.82, just 0.06 seconds behind Knox Finlay of Canada, narrowly missing the eighth and final spot in the final.

== International championships (50 m) ==
Meet	200 backstroke	200 medly	4x100 free	4x200 free	4x100 medley
WC 2022	3rd place, bronze medalist(s)				
WC 2023		4th			
WC 2024		5th	3rd place, bronze medalist(s)	(bronze) ^{[a]}	(gold) ^{[a]}
OG 2024		9th			
WC 2025		2nd place, silver medalist(s)	3rd place, bronze medalist(s)		

== International championships (25 m) ==
Meet	50 back	100 back	200 back	100 fly	100 medley	200 medley	4×50 free	4×100 free	4×200 free	4×50 medley	4×100 medley	4×50 mixed free	4×50 mixed medley	4×100 mixed medley
WC 2021	7th	1st place, gold medalist(s)	2nd place, silver medalist(s)				4th	3rd place, bronze medalist(s)		1st place, gold medalist(s)	2nd place, silver medalist(s)		2nd place, silver medalist(s)	
WC 2022			2nd place, silver medalist(s)	DNS	4th	4th	5th	3rd place, bronze medalist(s)		2nd place, silver medalist(s)		4th^{[a]}	(gold) ^{[a]}	
WC 2024						1st place, gold medalist(s)			1st place, gold medalist(s)		2nd place, silver medalist(s)		3rd place, bronze medalist(s)	(silver) ^{[a]}

^{a} Casas swam only in the preliminary heats.

== Personal bests ==
=== Long course meters (50 m pool) ===
Event	Time	Meet	Location	Date	Ref
100 m freestyle	47.92	2025 US Swimming Championships	Indianapolis, Indiana	June 3, 2025	
200 m freestyle	1:46.49	2025 TYR Pro Swim Series - Fort Lauderdale	Fort Lauderdale, Florida	May 2, 2025	
50 m backstroke	24.00	2022 US International Team Trials	Greensboro, North Carolina	April 28, 2022	
100 m backstroke	52.51	2022 Speedo Southern Sectionals	Austin, Texas	July 8, 2022	
200 m backstroke	1:55.35	2022 World Aquatics Championships	Budapest, Hungary	June 23, 2022	
100 m butterfly	50.40	2022 US National Championships	Irvine, California	July 28, 2022	
200 m individual medley	1:54.30	2025 World Aquatics Championships	Singapore	July 31, 2025	

=== Short course meters (25 m pool) ===
Event	Time		Meet	Location	Date	Ref
100 m freestyle	46.93	r, h	2021 World Short Course Championships	Abu Dhabi, United Arab Emirates	December 16, 2021	
50 m backstroke	22.99		2021 World Short Course Championships	Abu Dhabi, United Arab Emirates	December 19, 2021	
100 m backstroke	48.84		2022 Swimming World Cup	Toronto, Canada	October 30, 2022	
200 m backstroke	1:48.01		2022 World Short Course Championships	Melbourne, Australia	December 18, 2022	
50 m butterfly	22.57		2022 Swimming World Cup	Berlin, Germany	October 23, 2022	
100 m butterfly	52.97	h	2022 Swimming World Cup	Toronto, Canada	October 28, 2022	
100 m individual medley	51.03		2022 Swimming World Cup	Toronto, Canada	October 28, 2022	
200 m individual medley	1:49.51		2024 World Short Course Championships	Budapest, Hungary	December 10, 2024	

Legend: h – preliminary heat; r – relay 1st leg

== Swimming World Cup circuits ==
The following medals Casas has won at Swimming World Cup circuits.

Edition	Gold medals	Silver medals	Bronze medals	Total
2022	9	0	0	9
Total	9	0	0	9

== Continental and national records ==
=== Short course meters (25 m pool) ===
No.	Event	Time	Meet	Location	Date	Type	Status	Ref
1	4×50 m medley	1:30.51	2021 World Short Course Championships	Abu Dhabi, United Arab Emirates	December 20, 2021	AM, NR	Former	
2	200 m backstroke	1:48.40	2022 Swimming World Cup	Indianapolis, Indiana	November 3, 2022	US	Current	
3	100 m individual medley	51.04	2022 Swimming World Cup	Indianapolis, Indiana	November 3, 2022	US	Current	
4	4×50 m medley (2)	1:30.37	2022 World Short Course Championships	Melbourne, Australia	December 17, 2022	AM, NR	Current	

Legend: AM – Americas record; e – equalled existing record; NR – American record; US – U.S. Open record;
Records not set in finals: h – heat; sf – semifinal; r – relay 1st leg; rh – relay heat 1st leg; b – B final; † – en route to final mark; so – swim-off; tt – time trial

== Highlights ==
- 2017 Texas 6A high school state champion: 200-yard individual medley, 100-yard butterfly.
- 2019 US national champion: 100-meter backstroke.
- 2019—2020 US national team member: 100-backstroke, 200-backstroke.
- 2020 Swammy Award: NCAA Male Swimmer of the Year.
- 2020—2021 US national team member: 100-backstroke, 200-backstroke.
- 2021 NCAA champion: 200-yard individual medley, 100-yard backstroke, 200-yard backstroke.
- First NCAA national champion for Texas A&M University in men's swimming: 2021, 200-yard individual medley.
- 2020—2021 Southeastern Conference (SEC) Male Swimmer of the Year.
- First SEC Male Swimmer of the Year for Texas A&M University: 2020–2021.
- 2020—2021 CSCAA Division-I Men's Swimmer of the Year.
- First CSCAA Division-I Men's Swimmer of the Year for Texas A&M University: 2020–2021.
- 2021—2022 US national team member: 100-backstroke, 200-backstroke, 100-butterfly.
- First world title: 100-meter backstroke at the 2021 World Short Course Championships, his first World Championships.
- First long course World Championships medal: bronze medal in the 200-metre backstroke at the 2022 World Aquatics Championships, his first long course World Championships.
- 2024 - US Olympic Team - 200 Meter Individual Medley

== Awards and honors ==
- Southeastern Conference (SEC), Male Swimmer of the Year: 2020—2021
- Southeastern Conference (SEC), Commissioner's Trophy: 2020—2021
- College Swimming & Diving Coaches Association of America (CSCAA), Division-1 Swimmer of the Year (Men's): 2020—2021
- SwimSwam Swammy Award, NCAA Swimmer of the Year (male): 2020, 2021
- SwimSwam Top 100 (Men's): 2021 (#42), 2022 (#71)

== See also ==
- List of World Swimming Championships (25 m) medalists (men)
- List of people from Texas
- List of Texas A&M University people
