= Finlay Knox =

Canadian swimmer (born 2001)

Personal information
- National team: Canada
- Born: January 8, 2001 (age 25) Leeds, England
- Height: 1.91 m (6 ft 3 in)
- Weight: 81 kg (179 lb)

Sport
- Sport: Swimming
- Strokes: Individual medley
- Club: High Performance Centre – Vancouver
Medal record
Men's swimming
Representing Canada
World Championships (LC)
Gold medal – first place	2024 Doha	200 m medley
World Championships (SC)
Silver medal – second place	2024 Budapest	4×50 m mixed freestyle
Silver medal – second place	2024 Budapest	4×50 m mixed medley
Bronze medal – third place	2022 Melbourne	100 m medley
Bronze medal – third place	2022 Melbourne	200 m medley
Bronze medal – third place	2024 Budapest	200 m medley
Bronze medal – third place	2024 Budapest	4×100 m mixed medley
Pan Pacific Championships
Bronze medal – third place	2026 Irvine	4×100 m mixed medley
Commonwealth Games
Bronze medal – third place	2022 Birmingham	4×100 m freestyle
Pan American Games
Gold medal – first place	2023 Santiago	200 m medley
Bronze medal – third place	2023 Santiago	4×100 m freestyle
Bronze medal – third place	2023 Santiago	4×200 m freestyle
Bronze medal – third place	2023 Santiago	4×100 m medley
Bronze medal – third place	2023 Santiago	4×100 m mixed freestyle
World Junior Championships
Silver medal – second place	2019 Budapest	200 m medley
Bronze medal – third place	2019 Budapest	4×100 m medley
Youth Olympic Games
Bronze medal – third place	2018 Buenos Aires	200 m medley

Finlay Knox (born January 8, 2001) is a Canadian competitive swimmer.

== Career ==
Knox was born in England, and his family moved to New Zealand when he was two years old. Knox's family emigrated to Canada when he was seven.

=== 2018–2021 ===
Knox was named to his first Canadian national team at the 2018 Summer Youth Olympics held in Buenos Aires, Argentina. At this event, Knox won bronze in the 200 m individual medley The following year, Knox won two medals at the 2019 FINA World Junior Swimming Championships in Budapest.

As part of the 2021 Canadian Olympic swimming trials in Toronto, Knox broke the national record in the 200 individual medley event, with a time of 1:58.07. This qualified him for the 2020 Summer Olympics in Tokyo. Knox placed seventeenth in the heats of the men's 200 m individual medley, 0.14 seconds behind Japan's Daiya Seto, and thus missed qualifying to the semi-finals.

=== 2022–present ===
Knox was part of Canada's team for the 2022 Commonwealth Games, where he won a bronze with the men's team in the 4×100 m freestyle. He was the only member of the team to swim in both the heats and the final. This was the first men's relay medal for Canada at a major event since the 2015 Pan American Games, and the first at the Commonwealth Games since 2006. Knox also reached the finals of the 100 m butterfly and the 200 m medley, placing fourth in the latter.

Later that same year, Knox participated in the 2022 FINA World Swimming Championships in Melbourne. He won a bronze medal in the 200 m individual medley, his first individual medal at a major senior championship. He said afterward that a series of disappointments at recent championships had "lit a fire in my stomach and coming into this worlds I just didn’t want to let that happen again." He went on to claim a second bronze medal in the 100 m individual medley, joining fellow Canadian Javier Acevedo on the podium.

At the 2023 World Aquatics Championships in Fukuoka, Knox was added to the Canadian 4×100 m freestyle relay team for the first time. The team ultimately finished fifth. He also participated in the 4×200 m freestyle relay, where the Canadian team set its fastest time since 2009, but did not qualify to the final. Subsequently, Knox was part of the Canadian delegation to the 2023 Pan American Games, where he won four bronze medals in relay events and took the gold in the 200 m individual medley.

While many of Canada's top swimmers opted to skip the 2024 World Aquatics Championships in Doha, Knox was named to the team. Competing in the 200 m individual medley, Knox reached the final. Third through the first three segments, he surged into first place in the closing freestyle section, winning the World title. He became the first Canadian man to win a World Aquatics gold medal since Brent Hayden in 2007.
