= 2021 FINA Swimming World Cup =

Swimming World Cup

The 2021 FINA Swimming World Cup was a series of four three-day meets in four cities in October 2021. This edition was held in the short course (25-meter pool) format.

== Meets ==
The 2021 World Cup consisted of the following four meets.

Meet	Dates	Location	Venue	Results
1	1–3 October	Berlin, Germany	SSE (in German)	
2	7–9 October	Budapest, Hungary	Danube Arena	
3	21–23 October	Doha, Qatar	Hamad Aquatic Centre	
4	28–30 October	Kazan, Russia	Palace of Water Sports	

== World Cup standings ==
=== Men ===
Rank	Name	Nationality	Points awarded				Total
Rank	Name	Nationality	(Germany)	(Hungary)	(Qatar)	(Russia)	Total
1	Matthew Sates	South Africa	58.2	57.5	55.7	55.6	227.0
2	Tom Shields	United States	56.2	58.1	54.7	55.4	224.4
3	Arno Kamminga	Netherlands	57.8	56.0	55.9	54.4	224.1
4	Kyle Chalmers	Australia	55.7	55.7	54.0	54.4	219.8
5	Danas Rapšys	Lithuania	51.4	47.9	49.0	50.3	198.6
6	Fabian Schwingenschlögl	Germany	49.0	48.7	46.2	49.8	193.7
7	Szebasztián Szabó	Hungary	48.7	46.2	48.3	49.5	192.7
8	Yakov Toumarkin	Israel	47.3	46.6	44.8	43.3	182.0

=== Women ===
Rank	Name	Nationality	Points awarded				Total
Rank	Name	Nationality	(Germany)	(Hungary)	(Qatar)	(Russia)	Total
1	Emma McKeon	Australia	55.8	58.3	55.9	58.3	228.3
2	Kira Toussaint	Netherlands	52.8	58.1	58.3	58.2	227.4
3	Madison Wilson	Australia	50.6	50.7	55.0	52.8	209.1
4	Maria Ugolkova	Switzerland	33.3	56.0	54.3	54.7	198.3
5	Zsuzsanna Jakabos	Hungary	41.5	46.2	53.4	52.0	193.1
6	Holly Barratt	Australia	44.5	47.9	48.6	51.4	192.4
7	Michelle Coleman	Sweden	43.2	48.1	49.8	48.6	189.7
8	Leah Neale	Australia	13.7	42.4	41.3	52.5	149.9

== Event winners ==
=== 50 m freestyle ===
Meet	Men			Women		
Meet	Winner	Nationality	Time	Winner	Nationality	Time
Berlin	Kyle Chalmers	Australia	21.01	Emma McKeon	Australia	23.56
Budapest	Kyle Chalmers	Australia	20.97	Emma McKeon	Australia	23.50
Doha	Vladimir Morozov	Russia	20.89	Ranomi Kromowidjojo	Netherlands	23.46
Kazan	Kyle Chalmers	Australia	20.68	Emma McKeon	Australia	23.53

=== 100 m freestyle ===
Meet	Men			Women		
Meet	Winner	Nationality	Time	Winner	Nationality	Time
Berlin	Kyle Chalmers	Australia	45.73	Emma McKeon	Australia	50.96
Budapest	Kyle Chalmers	Australia	45.50	Emma McKeon	Australia	50.58 =WC
Doha	Kyle Chalmers	Australia	45.03	Emma McKeon	Australia	51.15
Kazan	Kyle Chalmers	Australia	44.84 WR	Emma McKeon	Australia	50.67

=== 200 m freestyle ===
Meet	Men			Women		
Meet	Winner	Nationality	Time	Winner	Nationality	Time
Berlin	Matthew Sates	South Africa	1:40.65 WJ	Madison Wilson	Australia	1:54.00
Budapest	Matthew Sates	South Africa	1:41.51	Madison Wilson	Australia	1:53.82
Doha	Hwang Sun-woo	South Korea	1:41.17	Madison Wilson	Australia	1:53.54
Kazan	Matthew Sates	South Africa	1:41.73	Madison Wilson	Australia	1:53.63
Kazan	Danas Rapšys	Lithuania	1:41.73	Madison Wilson	Australia	1:53.63

=== 400 m freestyle ===
Meet	Men			Women		
Meet	Winner	Nationality	Time	Winner	Nationality	Time
Berlin	Danas Rapšys	Lithuania	3:38.19	Isabel Marie Gose	Germany	4:00.33
Budapest	Matthew Sates	South Africa	3:37.92 WJ	Isabel Marie Gose	Germany	4:00.57
Doha	Matthew Sates	South Africa	3:38.64	Madison Wilson	Australia	4:03.58
Kazan	Matthew Sates	South Africa	3:38.28	Leah Neale	Australia	4:01.73

=== 1500 m (men) / 800 m (women) freestyle ===
Meet	Men (1500 m)			Women (800 m)		
Meet	Winner	Nationality	Time	Winner	Nationality	Time
Berlin	Florian Wellbrock	Germany	14:35.23	Cavan Gormsen	United States	8:22.16
Budapest	Florian Wellbrock	Germany	14:42.70	Cavan Gormsen	United States	8:16.76
Doha	Kim Woo-min	South Korea	14:44.58	Simona Quadarella	Italy	8:21.41
Kazan	Aleksei Rtishchev	Russia	14:47.27	Leah Neale	Australia	8:22.53

=== 50 m backstroke ===
Meet	Men			Women		
Meet	Winner	Nationality	Time	Winner	Nationality	Time
Berlin	Christian Diener	Germany	23.29	Kira Toussaint	Netherlands	25.81 WC
Budapest	Kristóf Milák	Hungary	23.08	Kira Toussaint	Netherlands	26.07
Doha	Pieter Coetze	South Africa	23.13	Kira Toussaint	Netherlands	25.93
Kazan	Pavel Samusenko	Russia	22.90	Kira Toussaint	Netherlands	25.87

=== 100 m backstroke ===
Meet	Men			Women		
Meet	Winner	Nationality	Time	Winner	Nationality	Time
Berlin	Christian Diener	Germany	50.32	Louise Hansson	Sweden	56.03
Budapest	Tom Shields	United States	50.50	Kira Toussaint	Netherlands	55.72
Doha	Pieter Coetze	South Africa	50.86	Kira Toussaint	Netherlands	55.79
Kazan	Kliment Kolesnikov	Russia	49.47	Kira Toussaint	Netherlands	55.42

=== 200 m backstroke ===
Meet	Men			Women		
Meet	Winner	Nationality	Time	Winner	Nationality	Time
Berlin	Christian Diener	Germany	1:51.19	Kira Toussaint	Netherlands	2:03.44
Budapest	Hubert Kós	Hungary	1:52.79	Kira Toussaint	Netherlands	2:02.09
Doha	Pieter Coetze	South Africa	1:52.09	Kira Toussaint	Netherlands	2:02.12
Kazan	Aleksei Tkachev	Russia	1:51.34	Kira Toussaint	Netherlands	2:03.51

=== 50 m breaststroke ===
Meet	Men			Women		
Meet	Winner	Nationality	Time	Winner	Nationality	Time
Berlin	Arno Kamminga	Netherlands	26.00	Anastasia Gorbenko	Israel	29.61
Budapest	Peter John Stevens	Slovenia	26.22	Nika Godun	Russia	29.81
Doha	Arno Kamminga	Netherlands	26.10	Yuliya Yefimova	Russia	30.11
Doha	Peter John Stevens	Slovenia	26.10	Yuliya Yefimova	Russia	30.11
Kazan	Fabian Schwingenschlögl	Germany	25.88	Nika Godun	Russia	29.64

=== 100 m breaststroke ===
Meet	Men			Women		
Meet	Winner	Nationality	Time	Winner	Nationality	Time
Berlin	Arno Kamminga	Netherlands	56.72	Anastasia Gorbenko	Israel	1:04.44
Budapest	Arno Kamminga	Netherlands	56.08	Nika Godun	Russia	1:04.71
Doha	Arno Kamminga	Netherlands	56.35	Yuliya Yefimova	Russia	1:06.08
Kazan	Arno Kamminga	Netherlands	55.82	Yuliya Yefimova	Russia	1:04.56

=== 200 m breaststroke ===
Meet	Men			Women		
Meet	Winner	Nationality	Time	Winner	Nationality	Time
Berlin	Arno Kamminga	Netherlands	2:01.92	Kristýna Horská	Czech Republic	2:21.07
Budapest	Arno Kamminga	Netherlands	2:02.07	Viktoriya Zeynep Güneş	Turkey	2:22.23
Doha	Daiya Seto	Japan	2:01.65	Yuliya Yefimova	Russia	2:22.19
Kazan	Daiya Seto	Japan	2:01.49	Vitalina Simonova	Russia	2:19.22

=== 50 m butterfly ===
Meet	Men			Women		
Meet	Winner	Nationality	Time	Winner	Nationality	Time
Berlin	Tom Shields	United States	22.09	Holly Barratt	Australia	24.77
Budapest	Tom Shields	United States	21.99	Emma McKeon	Australia	24.97
Doha	Tom Shields	United States	22.22	Ranomi Kromowidjojo	Netherlands	24.74
Kazan	Szebasztián Szabó	Hungary	21.97	Holly Barratt	Australia	24.75

=== 100 m butterfly ===
Meet	Men			Women		
Meet	Winner	Nationality	Time	Winner	Nationality	Time
Berlin	Tom Shields	United States	48.67	Maggie Mac Neil	Canada	55.30
Budapest	Tom Shields	United States	48.83	Linnea Mack	United States	56.77
Doha	Tom Shields	United States	49.46	Emma McKeon	Australia	55.83
Kazan	Tom Shields	United States	49.20	Emma McKeon	Australia	55.63

=== 200 m butterfly ===
Meet	Men			Women		
Meet	Winner	Nationality	Time	Winner	Nationality	Time
Berlin	Chad le Clos	South Africa	1:50.32	Tess Howley	United States	2:06.09
Budapest	Tom Shields	United States	1:51.18	Maria Ugolkova	Switzerland	2:06.44
Doha	Daiya Seto	Japan	1:49.76	Zsuzsanna Jakabos	Hungary	2:06.23
Kazan	Tom Shields	United States	1:52.42	Zsuzsanna Jakabos	Hungary	2:05.88

=== 100 m individual medley ===
Meet	Men			Women		
Meet	Winner	Nationality	Time	Winner	Nationality	Time
Berlin	Matthew Sates	South Africa	51.78	Anastasia Gorbenko	Israel	57.90
Budapest	Matthew Sates	South Africa	51.77	Maria Ugolkova	Switzerland	58.81
Doha	Daiya Seto	Japan	51.56	Maria Ugolkova	Switzerland	58.82
Kazan	Daiya Seto	Japan	51.29	Maria Ugolkova	Switzerland	58.47

=== 200 m individual medley ===
Meet	Men			Women		
Meet	Winner	Nationality	Time	Winner	Nationality	Time
Berlin	Matthew Sates	South Africa	1:51.45 WJ	Maria Ugolkova	Switzerland	2:08.01
Budapest	Matthew Sates	South Africa	1:53.43	Maria Ugolkova	Switzerland	2:06.99
Doha	Matthew Sates	South Africa	1:52.32	Maria Ugolkova	Switzerland	2:07.21
Kazan	Daiya Seto	Japan	1:50.66 WC	Maria Ugolkova	Switzerland	2:06.59

=== 400 m individual medley ===
Meet	Men			Women		
Meet	Winner	Nationality	Time	Winner	Nationality	Time
Berlin	Matthew Sates	South Africa	4:01.98	Zsuzsanna Jakabos	Hungary	4:31.15
Budapest	Matthew Sates	South Africa	4:04.21	Ilaria Cusinato	Italy	4:31.35
Doha	Daiya Seto	Japan	4:01.97	Zsuzsanna Jakabos	Hungary	4:31.78
Kazan	Daiya Seto	Japan	3:57.85	Zsuzsanna Jakabos	Hungary	4:30.38

=== 4 × 50 m mixed relays ===
Meet	4 × 50 m mixed freestyle			4 × 50 m mixed medley		
Meet	Winners	Nationality	Time	Winners	Nationality	Time
Berlin	Daniel Diehl; Quintin McCarty; Kristina Paegle; Carly Novelline	United States	1:31.50 WJ	Christian Diener; Fabian Schwingenschlögl; Angelina Köhler; Annika Bruhn	Germany	1:39.17
Budapest	Daniel Diehl; Quintin McCarty; Kristina Paegle; Anna Moesch	United States	1:32.34	Quintin McCarty; Zhier Fan; Charlotte Hook; Kristina Paegle	United States	1:41.21 WJ
Kazan	Daniil Markov; Aleksandr Borovtsov; Anita Grishchenko; Viktoriia Starostina	Novosibirsk Oblast; Russia	1:33.73	Stepan Kalabin; Vsevolod Zanko; Anastasiia Zhuravleva; Rozaliya Nasretdinova	Moscow; Russia	1:40.60

Legend: WR – World record; WJ – World Junior record; WC – World Cup record
