= 2022 FINA World Swimming Championships (25 m) – Men's 200 metre individual medley =

Swimming competition

Men's 200 metre individual medley at the 2022 FINA World Swimming Championships (25 m)
- Venue: Melbourne Sports and Aquatic Centre
- Location: Melbourne, Australia
- Dates: 13 December (heats and final)
- Competitors: 38 from 32 nations
- Winning time: 1:50.15

Medalists
gold medal	Matthew Sates	South Africa
silver medal	Carson Foster	United States
bronze medal	Finlay Knox	Canada

The Men's 200 metre individual medley competition of the 2022 FINA World Swimming Championships (25 m) was held on 13 December 2022.

== Records ==
Prior to the competition, the existing world and championship records were as follows.

World record	Ryan Lochte (USA)	1:49.63	Istanbul, Turkey	14 December 2012
Competition record	Ryan Lochte (USA)	1:49.63	Istanbul, Turkey	14 December 2012

== Results ==
=== Heats ===
The heats were started at 12:51.

Rank	Heat	Lane	Name	Nationality	Time	Notes
1	4	4	Daiya Seto	Japan	1:51.76	Q
2	5	5	Carson Foster	United States	1:51.89	Q
3	5	3	Finlay Knox	Canada	1:52.50	Q
4	4	5	Matthew Sates	South Africa	1:52.52	Q
4	5	4	Shaine Casas	United States	1:52.52	Q
6	5	6	Clyde Lewis	Australia	1:52.83	Q
7	3	5	Alberto Razzetti	Italy	1:52.98	Q
8	3	3	So Ogata	Japan	1:53.00	Q
9	4	3	Leonardo Coelho Santos	Brazil	1:53.07	
10	3	4	Andreas Vazaios	Greece	1:53.08	
11	4	1	Tom Dean	Great Britain	1:53.53	
12	5	2	Se-Bom Lee	Australia	1:53.71	
13	3	2	Carles Coll	Spain	1:54.03	
14	4	7	Kaloyan Bratanov	Bulgaria	1:54.50	NR
15	4	6	Caio Pumputis	Brazil	1:54.65	
16	4	2	Yakov Toumarkin	Israel	1:54.95	
17	3	6	Javier Acevedo	Canada	1:54.96	
18	5	7	Qin Haiyang	China	1:54.98	
19	5	1	Ronny Brännkärr	Finland	1:55.33	
20	2	3	Richard Nagy	Slovakia	1:57.13	NR
21	4	8	Hugo González	Spain	1:57.27	
22	5	8	Tomas Peribonio	Ecuador	1:57.32	
23	2	4	Luan Grobbelaar	New Zealand	1:57.38	
24	3	7	Émilien Mattenet	France	1:57.91	
25	3	8	Jakub Bursa	Czech Republic	1:58.01	
26	2	6	Wang Hsing-hao	Chinese Taipei	1:58.57	
27	2	7	Erick Gordillo	Guatemala	1:58.98	NR
28	3	1	Maximillian Ang	Singapore	1:59.11	
29	2	5	Kristaps Miķelsons	Latvia	1:59.49	
30	1	7	Siva Sridhar	India	1:59.80	NR
31	2	1	Dulyawat Kaewsriyong	Thailand	1:59.85	NR
32	2	2	Hayden Kwan	Hong Kong	1:59.91	
33	2	8	Esteban Núñez	Bolivia	2:01.44	NR
34	1	6	Lin Sizhuang	Macau	2:02.41	NR
35	1	5	Liam O'Hara	Zimbabwe	2:04.90	NR
36	1	3	Mubal Azzam Ibrahim	Maldives	2:19.77	NR
37	1	2	Kinley Lhendup	Bhutan	2:20.63	
	1	4	Matheo Mateos	Paraguay	Disqualified	

=== Final ===
The final was held at 20:32.

Rank	Lane	Name	Nationality	Time	Notes
1st place, gold medalist(s)	6	Matthew Sates	South Africa	1:50.15	AF
2nd place, silver medalist(s)	5	Carson Foster	United States	1:50.96	
3rd place, bronze medalist(s)	3	Finlay Knox	Canada	1:51.04	NR
4	2	Shaine Casas	United States	1:51.31	
5	4	Daiya Seto	Japan	1:51.39	
6	1	Alberto Razzetti	Italy	1:51.73	
7	7	Clyde Lewis	Australia	1:53.19	
8	8	So Ogata	Japan	1:53.40	
