= Swimming at the 2025 World Aquatics Championships – Men's 400 metre individual medley =

Men's 400 metre individual medley at the 2025 World Aquatics Championships
- Venue: World Aquatics Championships Arena
- Location: Singapore Sports Hub, Kallang
- Dates: 3 August
- Competitors: 33 from 28 nations
- Winning time: 4:04.73

Medalists
gold medal	Léon Marchand	France
silver medal	Tomoyuki Matsushita	Japan
bronze medal	Ilia Borodin

The men's 400 metre individual medley event at the 2025 World Aquatics Championships was held on 3 August 2025 at the World Aquatics Championships Arena at the Singapore Sports Hub in Kallang, Singapore.

== Background ==
France’s Léon Marchand, the two-time defending World Champion and Olympic gold medalist, enters as the favorite, having posted a world-leading 4:07.11 earlier in 2025 despite injuries. Japan continues its strong tradition in the event, with Tomoyuki Matsushita, who swam 4:08.62 for silver at the Paris Olympics and improved to 4:08.61 this year, and Asaki Nishikawa, who recently recorded 4:09.63. The United States will be represented by Carson Foster, a two-time World silver medalist whose 4:07.92 ranks second among entrants, and Rex Maurer, who broke 4:10 for the first time in 2025. Great Britain’s Max Litchfield, New Zealand’s Lewis Clareburt, and Italy’s Alberto Razzetti are among the experienced medal contenders, while Russia’s Ilya Borodin, competing for the Neutral Athletes B team, and China’s Wang Shun could also challenge for the final.

== Qualification ==
Each National Federation was permitted to enter a maximum of two qualified athletes in each individual event, but they could do so only if both of them had attained the "A" standard qualification time. For this event, the "A" standard qualification time was 4:17.48. Federations could enter one athlete into the event if they met the "B" standard qualification time. For this event, the "B" standard qualification time was 4:26.49. Athletes could also enter the event if they had met an "A" or "B" standard in a different event and their Federation had not entered anyone else. Additional considerations applied to Federations who had few swimmers enter through the standard qualification times. Federations in this category could at least enter two men and two women to the competition, all of whom could enter into up to two events.

Top 10 fastest qualification times
Swimmer	Country	Time	Competition
Léon Marchand	France	4:02.95	2024 Summer Olympics
Bobby Finke	United States	4:07.46	2025 United States Championships
Carson Foster	United States	4:07.64	2024 United States Olympic Trials
Tomoyuki Matsushita	Japan	4:08.61	2025 Japanese Championships
Max Litchfield	Great Britain	4:08.85	2024 Summer Olympics
Alberto Razzetti	Italy	4:09.38	2024 Summer Olympics
Chase Kalisz	United States	4:09.39	2024 United States Olympic Trials
Asaki Nishikawa	Japan	4:09.63	2025 Japanese Championships
Rex Maurer	United States	4:09.65	2025 National Championships
Daiya Seto	Japan	4:09.68	2024 Sette Colli

== Records ==
Prior to the competition, the existing world and championship records were as follows.

World record	Léon Marchand (FRA)	4:02.50	Fukuoka, Japan	23 July 2023
Competition record	Léon Marchand (FRA)	4:02.50	Fukuoka, Japan	23 July 2023

== Heats ==
The heats were started at 10:02.

Rank	Heat	Lane	Swimmer	Nation	Time	Notes
1	4	5	Tomoyuki Matsushita	Japan	4:10.39	Q
2	3	3	Asaki Nishikawa	Japan	4:10.41	Q
3	3	7	Ilia Borodin	Neutral Athletes B	4:10.63	Q
4	3	5	Max Litchfield	Great Britain	4:11.41	Q
5	3	9	Maxim Stupin	Neutral Athletes B	4:11.53	Q
6	3	6	Brendon Smith	Australia	4:13.08	Q
7	4	4	Léon Marchand	France	4:13.19	Q
8	4	8	Gábor Zombori	Hungary	4:13.59	Q
9	4	1	Balázs Holló	Hungary	4:13.88	
10	4	2	Lewis Clareburt	New Zealand	4:13.89	
11	2	5	Thomas Jansen	Netherlands	4:14.19	
12	4	3	Alberto Razzetti	Italy	4:14.52	
13	3	0	Zhang Zhanshuo	China	4:15.86	
14	4	9	Lorne Wigginton	Canada	4:16.61	
15	2	2	Daniil Giourtzidis	Greece	4:16.62	
16	4	0	William Petric	Australia	4:16.91	
17	2	7	Marius Toscan	Switzerland	4:17.01	
18	2	1	Noah Zemansky	Austria	4:18.89	
19	3	1	Cedric Büssing	Germany	4:18.95	
20	4	6	Rex Maurer	United States	4:19.30	
21	2	9	Richard Nagy	Slovakia	4:19.69	
22	2	6	Stephan Steverink	Brazil	4:20.71	
23	2	4	Jakub Bursa	Czech Republic	4:22.28	
24	1	5	Munzer Kabbara	Lebanon	4:23.51	NR
25	1	2	Nguyễn Quang Thuấn	Vietnam	4:23.99	
26	1	6	Zackery Tay	Singapore	4:26.71	
27	1	4	Mohamed-Yassine Ben Abbes	Tunisia	4:29.14	
28	1	3	Shoan Ganguly	India	4:30.40	
29	1	7	Tan Khai Xin	Malaysia	4:30.90	
30	4	7	Apostolos Papastamos	Greece	4:31.05	
31	1	1	Ahmed Theibich	Bahrain	4:56.83	
32	1	8	Mohamed Rihan Shiham	Maldives	5:15.03	
	2	3	Kim Min-seop	South Korea	Disqualified	
	2	0	Jaouad Syoud	Algeria	Did not start	
	2	8	Matthew Sates	South Africa	Did not start	
	3	2	Wang Shun	China	Did not start	
	3	4	Carson Foster	United States	Did not start	
	3	8	Tristan Jankovics	Canada	Did not start	

== Final ==
The final took place at 19:59.

Rank	Lane	Name	Nationality	Time	Notes
1st place, gold medalist(s)	1	Léon Marchand	France	4:04.73	
2nd place, silver medalist(s)	4	Tomoyuki Matsushita	Japan	4:08.32	
3rd place, bronze medalist(s)	3	Ilia Borodin	Neutral Athletes B	4:09.16	
4	5	Asaki Nishikawa	Japan	4:10.21	
5	2	Maxim Stupin	Neutral Athletes B	4:12.46	
6	8	Gábor Zombori	Hungary	4:12.51	
7	6	Max Litchfield	Great Britain	4:12.77	
8	7	Brendon Smith	Australia	4:13.28	
