= Swimming at the 2024 Summer Olympics – Men's 400-metre individual medley =

Men's 400 metre individual medley at the Games of the XXXIII Olympiad
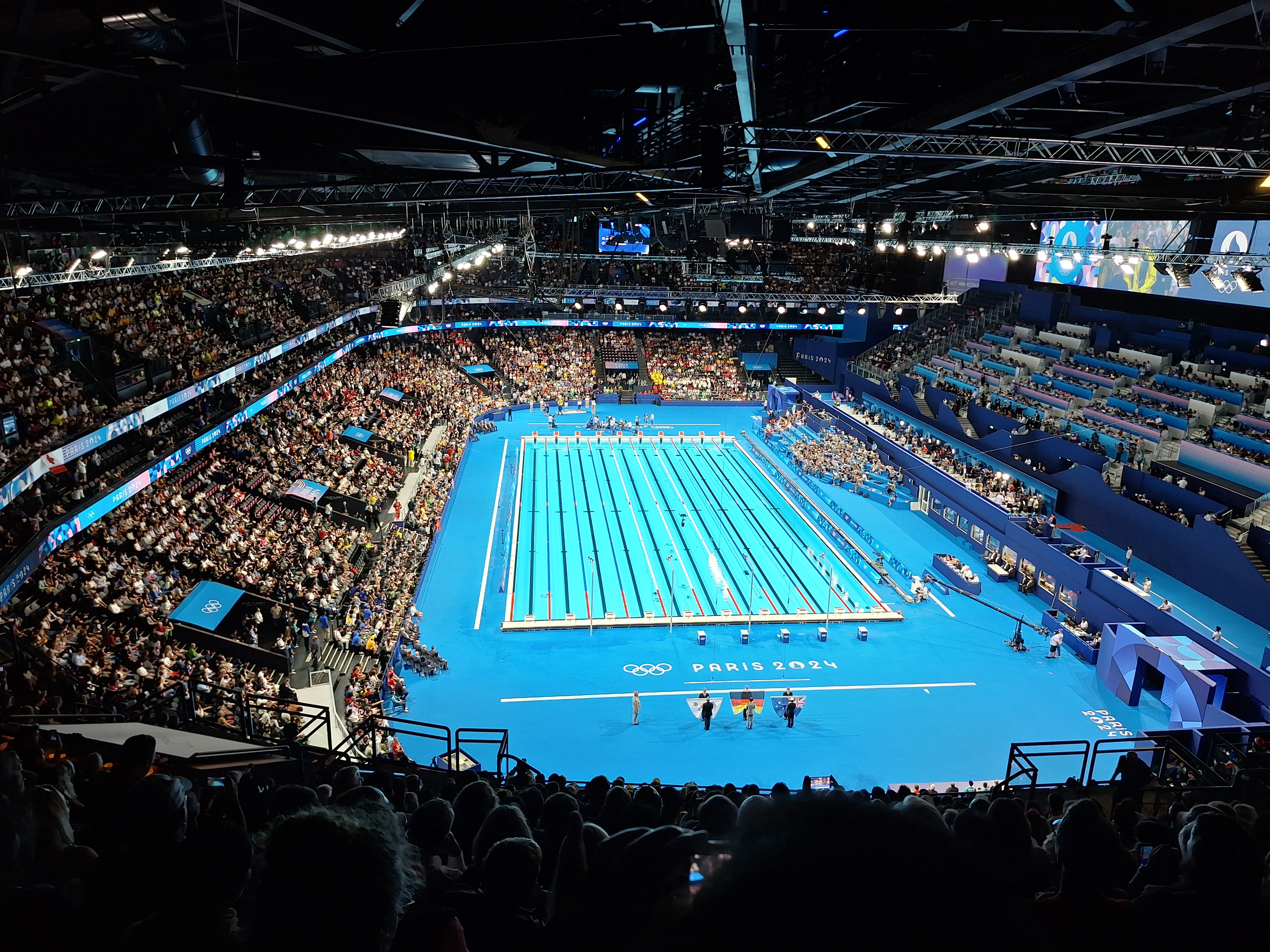
- Paris La Défense Arena after it was converted to a swimming pool for the swimming events
- Venue: Paris La Défense Arena
- Dates: 28 July 2024 (Heats & Final)
- Competitors: 16 from 12 nations
- Winning time: 4:02.95 OR

Medalists
1st place, gold medalist(s)		Léon Marchand	France
2nd place, silver medalist(s)		Tomoyuki Matsushita	Japan
3rd place, bronze medalist(s)		Carson Foster	United States

The men's 400 metre individual medley event at the 2024 Summer Olympics was held on 28 July 2024 at Paris La Défense Arena, which was converted to a swimming pool for the swimming events.

The world record holder Léon Marchand of France was considered the most likely to win the event. He qualified for the finals with the fastest qualification time, while the US' defending Olympic champion Chase Kalisz and Australia's defending Olympic bronze medallist Brendon Smith both failed to qualify for the finals. In the first round, Germany's Cedric Büssing swam a time of 4:11.52 to break his country's national record.

In the finals, Marchand led the race from beginning to end, finishing with a new Olympic record of 4:02.95, winning his first Olympic medal. Japanese swimmer Tomoyuki Matsushita won silver with 4:08.62 and the US' Carson Foster won bronze with 4:08.66. Great Britain's Max Litchfield finished fourth with a new national record of 4:08.85.

== Background ==
France's Léon Marchand won the event at the 2022 and 2023 World Aquatics Championships. At the 2023 Worlds, he broke Michael Phelps' world record in the event, setting it at 4:02.50. SwimSwam opined that he was "the clear and obvious front-runner", while Swimming World also said he was the favourite. Other medal contenders were the US' Carson Foster, who finished second at the 2022 and 2023 World Championships; his training partner and the 2020 Olympic champion Chase Kalisz; Japan's bronze medallist at the 2023 World Championships, Daiya Seto; and Japan's Tomoyuki Matsushita, the 2023 Junior World Champion.

The event was held at Paris La Défense Arena, which was converted to a swimming pool for the swimming events.

== Qualification ==
Each National Olympic Committee (NOC) was permitted to enter a maximum of two qualified athletes in each individual event, but only if both of them had attained the Olympic Qualifying Time (OQT). For this event, the OQT was set at 4:12.50. World Aquatics then filled the rest of the event places with athletes qualifying through universality places, which were reserved for athletes from under-represented nations. NOCs were given one event entry for each gender, which could be used by any athlete regardless of qualification time, providing the spaces had not already been taken by athletes from that nation who had achieved the OQT. In total, 16 athletes qualified through achieving the OQT, while no athletes qualified through universality places.

Top 10 fastest qualification times
Swimmer	Country	Time	Competition
Léon Marchand	France	04:02:50	2023 World Aquatics Championships
Carson Foster	United States	04:06:56	2023 World Aquatics Championships
Daiya Seto	Japan	04:07:92	2023 Japanese Championships
Chase Kalisz	United States	04:08:22	2023 United States National Championships
Max Litchfield	Great Britain	04:09:14	2024 Aquatics GB Swimming Championships
Alberto Razzetti	Italy	04:09:29	2023 Italian Championships
Lewis Clareburt	New Zealand	04:09:72	2024 World Aquatics Championships
Tomoyuki Matsushita	Japan	04:10:04	2024 Japanese Olympic Trials
Brendon Smith	Australia	04:10:18	2024 Australian Olympic Trials
Apostolos Papastamos	Greece	04:10:83	2024 European Aquatics Championships

== Heats ==
Two heats (preliminary rounds) took place on 28 July 2024, starting at 11:15. (Note: All times are Central European Summer Time (UTC+2)) The swimmers with the best eight times in the heats advanced to the final. Leon Marchand qualified with the fastest seed in the second heat, while Carson Foster won the first. The US' defending Olympic champion Chase Kalisz and Australia's defending Olympic bronze medallist Brendon Smith both failed to qualify. Germany's Cedric Büssing qualified for the final in joint sixth place, breaking the nine-year-old national record with a time of 4:11.52 and becoming the first swimmer in the NCAA Division II to qualify for an Olympic final.

Results
Rank	Heat	Lane	Swimmer	Nation	Time	Notes
1	2	4	Léon Marchand	France	4:08.30	Q
2	2	3	Max Litchfield	Great Britain	4:09.51	Q
3	2	5	Daiya Seto	Japan	4:10.92	Q
4	1	4	Carson Foster	United States	4:11.07	Q
5	1	6	Tomoyuki Matsushita	Japan	4:11.18	Q
6	1	3	Alberto Razzetti	Italy	4:11.52	Q
6	2	6	Lewis Clareburt	New Zealand	4:11.52	Q
6	2	8	Cedric Büssing	Germany	4:11.52	Q, NR
9	2	7	Balázs Holló	Hungary	4:12.20	
10	1	8	Zhang Zhanshuo	China	4:12.71	
11	1	5	Chase Kalisz	United States	4:13.36	
12	1	1	William Petric	Australia	4:13.58	
13	2	2	Brendon Smith	Australia	4:14.36	
14	1	7	Gábor Zombori	Hungary	4:14.88	
15	1	2	Apostolos Papastamos	Greece	4:15.32	
16	2	1	Tristan Jankovics	Canada	4:18.23	

== Final ==
The final took place at 20:30 on 28 July. Léon Marchand led the race from start to finish, finishing the first 50 metres 0.65 ahead of his world record pace. He was also 0.19 ahead of his world record at 350 metres but lost this lead in the final 50 metres to finish with a time of 4:02.95. At the 100 and 200 metre marks, Daiya Seto was in second and was followed by Carson Foster in third. Over the breaststroke part of the race (200–300 m), Foster overtook Seto for second. Over the final 100 metres, Seto moved down to seventh while fellow Japanese swimmer Tomoyuki Matsushita moved up from fifth to second, pushing Foster to third and winning the silver medal with a time of 4:08.62. SwimSwam later said that Matsushita's silver medal "might have been the most unexpected" swim at the Paris Olympics. Foster finished the race in third with 4:08.66, winning bronze. Great Britain's Max Litchfield finished fourth in the event for the third consecutive Olympics with a time of 4:08.85—a new national record.

During the breaststroke leg of the race, the crowd cheered "allez!" (French for "go") each time Marchand's head was above the water. SwimSwam later reported that "For that brief period during tonight's session, it was a symbiotic relationship between Marchand and the crowd", and Marchand later said, "The atmosphere was amazing, I don’t know how to explain it".

Marchand's winning time of 4:02.95 broke Michael Phelps' Olympic record from Beijing 2008 and won him his first Olympic medal. The winning margin was also the longest time between first and second ever for this event at the Olympics. He went on to win three more gold medals at the same Games, in the 200 butterfly, 200 individual medley and 200 breaststroke.

Results
Rank	Lane	Swimmer	Nation	Time	Notes
1st place, gold medalist(s)	4	Léon Marchand	France	4:02.95	OR
2nd place, silver medalist(s)	2	Tomoyuki Matsushita	Japan	4:08.62	
3rd place, bronze medalist(s)	6	Carson Foster	United States	4:08.66	
4	5	Max Litchfield	Great Britain	4:08.85	NR
5	7	Alberto Razzetti	Italy	4:09.38	
6	1	Lewis Clareburt	New Zealand	4:10.44	
7	3	Daiya Seto	Japan	4:11.78	
8	8	Cedric Büssing	Germany	4:17.16	

Statistics
Name	100 metre split	200 metre split	300 metre split	Time	Stroke rate (strokes/min)
Léon Marchand	00:54.32	01:56.76	03:04.24	4:02.95	40.7
Tomoyuki Matsushita	00:56.52	02:01:13	03:11.56	4:08.62	42.5
Carson Foster	00:55.64	01:59.75	03:10.70	4:08.66	39.7
Max Litchfield	00:56.23	02:00.02	03:11.35	4:08.85	41.3
Alberto Razzetti	00:56.00	02:01.21	03:11.86	4:09.38	39.8
Lewis Clareburt	00:56.03	02:00.42	03:12.30	4:10.44	40.0
Daiya Seto	00:54.88	01:59.66	03:10.91	4:11.78	43.1
Cedric Büssing	00:57.92	02:03.24	03:16.29	4:17.16	38.2
