= Swimming at the 2020 European Aquatics Championships – Men's 200 metre individual medley =

Men's 200 metre individual medley at the 2020 European Aquatics Championships
- Venue: Danube Arena
- Dates: 19 May 2021 (heats and semifinals); 20 May 2021 (final)
- Competitors: 42 from 24 nations
- Winning time: 1:56.76

Medalists
gold medal	Hugo González	Spain
silver medal	Jérémy Desplanches	Switzerland
bronze medal	Alberto Razzetti	Italy

The Men's 200 metre individual medley competition of the 2020 European Aquatics Championships was held on 19 and 20 May 2021.

== Records ==
Before the competition, the existing world, European and championship records were as follows.

	Name	Nationality	Time	Location	Date
World record	Ryan Lochte	United States	1:54.00	Shanghai	24 July 2011
European record	László Cseh	Hungary	1:55.18	Rome	29 July 2009
Championship record	László Cseh	Hungary	1:56.66	Debrecen	23 May 2012

== Results ==
=== Heats ===
The heats were started on 19 May at 10:00.

Rank	Heat	Lane	Name	Nationality	Time	Notes
1	4	4	Jérémy Desplanches	Switzerland	1:58.10	Q
2	4	6	Max Litchfield	Great Britain	1:58.12	Q
3	5	4	Duncan Scott	Great Britain	1:58.14	Q
4	5	3	László Cseh	Hungary	1:58.46	Q
5	3	5	Joe Litchfield	Great Britain	1:58.79	
6	4	5	Hubert Kós	Hungary	1:58.87	Q
7	3	4	Alberto Razzetti	Italy	1:58.90	Q
8	3	6	Hugo González	Spain	1:58.99	Q
9	5	5	Andrey Zhilkin	Russia	1:59.31	Q, WD
10	5	2	James McFadzen	Great Britain	1:59.34	
11	5	0	Maxim Stupin	Russia	1:59.84	Q
12	3	2	Yakov Toumarkin	Israel	1:59.85	Q
13	3	3	Alexis Santos	Portugal	2:00.01	Q
14	5	7	Bernhard Reitshammer	Austria	2:00.14	Q
15	4	3	Ilya Borodin	Russia	2:00.23	
16	5	6	Andreas Vazaios	Greece	2:00.26	Q
17	4	1	Tomoe Zenimoto Hvas	Norway	2:00.32	Q
18	3	8	Arjan Knipping	Netherlands	2:00.35	Q
19	4	8	Dániel Sós	Hungary	2:00.54	
20	2	3	Samuel Törnqvist	Sweden	2:00.68	Q
21	4	2	Ron Polonsky	Israel	2:01.54	Q
22	2	7	Berke Saka	Turkey	2:01.58	
23	3	0	Diogo Carvalho	Portugal	2:01.80	
24	4	9	Joan Lluís Pons	Spain	2:02.14	
25	5	8	Clément Bidard	France	2:02.29	
26	5	1	Simon Sjödin	Sweden	2:02.30	
27	4	7	Apostolos Papastamos	Greece	2:02.49	
28	2	5	Dawid Szwedzki	Poland	2:03.22	
29	2	9	Richard Nagy	Slovakia	2:03.35	
30	5	9	Metin Aydın	Turkey	2:03.45	
31	2	4	Daniil Giourtzidis	Greece	2:03.65	
32	3	9	Danny Schmidt	Germany	2:04.63	
33	2	6	Christoph Meier	Liechtenstein	2:04.84	
34	2	2	Maksym Holubnychyi	Ukraine	2:05.15	
35	3	7	Raphaël Stacchiotti	Luxembourg	2:05.60	
36	2	0	Marius Toscan	Switzerland	2:06.59	
37	1	5	Arti Krasniqi	Kosovo	2:07.29	NR
38	1	4	Joao Soares Carneiro	Luxembourg	2:07.84	
39	2	8	Alex Kušík	Slovakia	2:08.16	
40	1	3	Thomas Wareing	Malta	2:08.34	
41	2	1	Ievhen Khrypunov	Ukraine	2:09.44	
42	1	6	Paolo Priska	Albania	2:19.93	
	4	0	Gal Cohen Groumi	Israel	Did not start	
	3	1	Balázs Holló	Hungary	Did not start	

=== Semifinals ===
The semifinals were started on 19 May at 19:24.

==== Semifinal 1 ====
Rank	Lane	Name	Nationality	Time	Notes
1	3	Alberto Razzetti	Italy	1:57.39	Q
2	4	Max Litchfield	Great Britain	1:58.42	Q
3	5	László Cseh	Hungary	1:58.45	q
4	7	Andreas Vazaios	Greece	1:58.62	q
5	6	Maxim Stupin	Russia	1:58.99	
6	2	Alexis Santos	Portugal	1:59.13	
7	1	Arjan Knipping	Netherlands	2:00.46	
	8	Ron Polonsky	Israel	2:01.11	

==== Semifinal 2 ====
Rank	Lane	Name	Nationality	Time	Notes
1	3	Hubert Kós	Hungary	1:56.99	Q, WJ
2	4	Jérémy Desplanches	Switzerland	1:57.42	Q
3	5	Duncan Scott	Great Britain	1:57.48	q
4	6	Hugo González	Spain	1:58.08	q
5	2	Yakov Toumarkin	Israel	2:00.60	
6	8	Samuel Törnqvist	Sweden	2:01.24	
7	7	Bernhard Reitshammer	Austria	2:01.40	
8	1	Tomoe Zenimoto Hvas	Norway	2:03.68	

=== Final ===
The final was held on 20 May at 19:16.

Rank	Lane	Name	Nationality	Time	Notes
1st place, gold medalist(s)	2	Hugo González	Spain	1:56.76	NR
2nd place, silver medalist(s)	3	Jérémy Desplanches	Switzerland	1:56.95	
3rd place, bronze medalist(s)	5	Alberto Razzetti	Italy	1:57.25	
4	1	László Cseh	Hungary	1:58.04	
5	4	Hubert Kós	Hungary	1:58.12	
6	6	Duncan Scott	Great Britain	1:58.18	
7	8	Andreas Vazaios	Greece	1:58.35	
8	7	Max Litchfield	Great Britain	1:58.52	
