= 2024 World Aquatics Swimming Championships (25 m) – Men's 400 metre individual medley =

Swimming competition

Men's 400 metre individual medley at the 2024 World Aquatics Swimming Championships (25 m)
- Venue: Duna Arena
- Location: Budapest, Hungary
- Dates: 14 December (heats and final)
- Competitors: 38 from 32 nations
- Winning time: 3:56.83

Medalists
gold medal	Ilya Borodin
silver medal	Carson Foster	United States
bronze medal	Alberto Razzetti	Italy

The men's 400 metre individual medley event at the 2024 World Aquatics Swimming Championships (25 m) was held on 14 December 2024 at the Duna Arena in Budapest, Hungary.

== Records ==
Prior to the competition, the existing world and championship records were as follows:

World record	Daiya Seto (JPN)	3:54.81	Las Vegas, United States of America	20 December 2019
Competition record	Ryan Lochte (USA)	3:55.50	Dubai, United Arab Emirates	16 December 2010

== Background ==
Japan’s Daiya Seto had dominated this event at the Short Course World Championships since 2012, winning six consecutive titles and setting the world record in 2019 (3:54.81). He entered Budapest as the favourite until a cracked rib cast doubt on his participation and form. Seto had previously clocked 3:55.75 to win gold in 2022. His main challengers included Ilya Borodin of Russia, competing as a neutral athlete, who held a lifetime best of 3:56.47 and had swum 3:57.67 earlier in the season, and Italy’s Alberto Razzetti, who had the fastest qualifying time with a 3:57.01 from the 2023 European Championships. The USA’s Carson Foster, a 2021 and 2022 medalist, was also a podium contender. Other finalists included Great Britain’s Max Litchfield (4:00.18 PB), Cedric Büssing of Germany, David Schlicht of Australia (4:02.85 PB), Kaito Tabuchi of Japan, Trenton Julian of the USA, China’s Huang Zhiwei, Greece’s Apostolos Papastamos, and Hungary’s Balázs Holló.

SwimSwam predicted Borodin would win, Foster would come second, and Razzetti would come third.

== Results ==
=== Heats ===
The heats were started at 9:28.

Rank	Heat	Lane	Name	Nationality	Time	Notes
1	3	8	Max Litchfield	Great Britain	4:00.37	Q
2	3	4	Ilya Borodin	Neutral Athletes B	4:01.28	Q
3	4	9	Tristan Jankovics	Canada	4:02.01	Q, NR
4	4	2	Carson Foster	United States	4:02.11	Q
5	4	4	Alberto Razzetti	Italy	4:02.18	Q
6	3	5	Kaito Tabuchi	Japan	4:03.85	Q
7	4	6	Trenton Julian	United States	4:03.96	Q
8	3	6	Apostolos Papastamos	Greece	4:04.24	Q
9	4	5	Daiya Seto	Japan	4:05.45	R
10	4	3	David Schlicht	Australia	4:05.63	R
11	3	1	Robert Badea	Romania	4:06.42	NR
12	3	0	Cedric Büssing	Germany	4:06.73	
13	2	6	Dominik Török	Hungary	4:06.80	
14	4	1	Gábor Zombori	Hungary	4:07.25	
15	3	7	Jakub Bursa	Czech Republic	4:08.02	
16	3	3	Huang Zhiwei	China	4:08.87	
17	2	3	Fu Kun-ming	Chinese Taipei	4:09.36	NR
18	2	4	Marius Toscan	Switzerland	4:10.39	
19	3	2	Darius Coman	Romania	4:10.78	
20	4	0	Richard Nagy	Slovakia	4:11.09	
21	2	0	Jarod Arroyo	Puerto Rico	4:11.55	
22	1	5	Jaouad Syoud	Algeria	4:11.71	NR
23	4	8	Samuel Lewis Brown	New Zealand	4:12.33	
24	2	2	Heorhii Lukashev	Ukraine	4:12.44	
25	1	4	Nguyễn Quang Thuấn	Vietnam	4:12.94	
26	3	9	Jack Cassin	Ireland	4:12.96	
27	2	1	Zackery Tay	Singapore	4:13.98	NR
28	2	8	Daniil Giourtzidis	Greece	4:14.07	
29	1	3	Juraj Barčot	Croatia	4:14.51	
30	4	7	He Yubo	China	4:14.55	
31	1	1	Kristaps Miķelsons	Latvia	4:16.73	
31	2	5	Belhassen Ben Miled	Tunisia	4:16.73	
33	1	2	Oliver Durand	Namibia	4:16.99	NR
34	1	6	Matheo Mateos	Paraguay	4:17.95	
35	2	7	Tan Khai Xin	Malaysia	4:18.63	
36	2	9	Kian Keylock	South Africa	4:23.22	
37	1	7	Sam Williamson	Bermuda	4:23.25	
38	1	8	Hussaine Taha	Oman	4:36.34	

=== Final ===
The final was held at 18:42.

Rank	Lane	Name	Nationality	Time	Notes
1st place, gold medalist(s)	5	Ilya Borodin	Neutral Athletes B	3:56.83	
2nd place, silver medalist(s)	6	Carson Foster	United States	3:57.45	
3rd place, bronze medalist(s)	2	Alberto Razzetti	Italy	3:58.83	
4	7	Kaito Tabuchi	Japan	4:00.43	
5	4	Max Litchfield	Great Britain	4:00.50	
6	3	Tristan Jankovics	Canada	4:00.57	NR
7	8	Apostolos Papastamos	Greece	4:04.26	
8	1	Trenton Julian	United States	4:05.81	
