= Swimming at the 2026 European Aquatics Championships – Men's 400 metre individual medley =

Men's 400 metre individual medley at the 2026 European Aquatics Championships
- Venue: Paris Aquatic Centre
- Dates: 10 August 2026
- Competitors: 26 from 20 nations
- Winning time: 4:08.17 CR

Medalists
gold medal	Ilya Borodin
silver medal	Alberto Razzetti	Italy
bronze medal	Max Litchfield	Great Britain

The Men's 400 metre individual medley competition of the 2026 European Aquatics Championships was held on 10 August 2026.

== Records ==
Prior to the competition, the existing world, European and championship records were as follows:

Record	Mark	Swimmer	Venue	Date
World record	4:02.50	Leon Marchand (FRA)	(Japan) Fukuoka	23 July 2023
European record	4:02.50	Leon Marchand (FRA)	(Japan) Fukuoka	23 July 2023
Championship record	4:09.59	László Cseh (HUN)	(Netherlands) Eindhoven	24 March 2008
World Jr Record	4:08.84	Yumeki Kojima (JPN)	(Japan) Tokyo	22 March 2026
European Jr Record	4:10.02	Ilya Borodin (RUS)	(Hungary) Budapest	23 May 2021

The following records were set during the competition:

Record	Mark	Swimmer	Venue	Date
Championship record	4:08.17	Ilya Borodin	(France) Paris	10 August 2026

== Results ==
=== Heats ===
The heats were started at 09:30.

Rank	Heat	Lane	Swimmer	Nation	Time	Notes
1	3	4	Ilya Borodin	Neutral Athletes B	4:13.10	Q
2	2	7	Finn Hammer	Germany	4:13.45	Q
3	2	5	Alberto Razzetti	Italy	4:13.54	Q
4	2	4	Max Litchfield	Great Britain	4:13.69	Q
5	3	3	Cedric Büssing	Germany	4:14.59	Q
6	2	6	Apostolos Papastamos	Greece	4:14.79	Q
7	3	6	Thomas Jansen	Netherlands	4:15.38	Q
8	3	1	Panagiotis Vlachogiannakos	Greece	4:16.06	Q
9	2	2	Daniil Giourtzidis	Greece	4:17.11	
10	3	5	Maxim Stupin	Neutral Athletes B	4:17.16	
11	3	2	Diego Mira	Spain	4:17.23	
12	3	7	Marius Toscan	Switzerland	4:17.77	
13	3	8	Michal Judickij	Czech Republic	4:18.83	
14	2	1	Noah Zemansky	Austria	4:19.47	
15	2	8	Simon Laviolette	Belgium	4:20.30	
16	2	0	Samuel Košťál	Slovakia	4:21.45	
17	1	4	Liam Custer	Ireland	4:22.55	NR
18	3	0	Matei State	Romania	4:23.44	
19	1	3	Oliver Kuulpak	Estonia	4:26.87	
20	3	9	Strahinja Maslo	Serbia	4:27.41	
21	2	9	Eetu Autio	Finland	4:28.20	
22	1	5	Philipp Rizek	Austria	4:28.69	
23	1	6	Hólmar Grétarsson	Iceland	4:29.65	
24	1	7	Donats Dragasjus	Latvia	4:31.40	
25	1	2	Biel Cuen	Andorra	4:31.82	
	2	3	Robert Badea	Romania	Disqualified	

=== Final ===
The final was held at 18:46.

Rank	Lane	Swimmer	Nation	Time	Notes
1st place, gold medalist(s)	4	Ilya Borodin	Neutral Athletes B	4:08.17	CR
2nd place, silver medalist(s)	3	Alberto Razzetti	Italy	4:10.40	
3rd place, bronze medalist(s)	6	Max Litchfield	Great Britain	4:11.58	
4	2	Cedric Büssing	Germany	4:14.16	
5	5	Finn Hammer	Germany	4:14.31	
6	7	Apostolos Papastamos	Greece	4:14.99	
7	8	Panagiotis Vlachogiannakos	Greece	4:16.12	
8	1	Thomas Jansen	Netherlands	4:16.99	
