= Swimming at the 2020 European Aquatics Championships – Men's 400 metre individual medley =

Men's 400 metre individual medley at the 2020 European Aquatics Championships
- Venue: Danube Arena
- Dates: 23 May 2021
- Competitors: 27 from 20 nations
- Winning time: 4:10.02

Medalists
gold medal	Ilya Borodin	Russia
silver medal	Alberto Razzetti	Italy
bronze medal	Max Litchfield	Great Britain

The Men's 400 metre individual medley competition of the 2020 European Aquatics Championships was held on 23 May 2021.

== Records ==
Prior to the competition, the existing world, European and championship records were as follows.

	Name	Nation	Time	Location	Date
World record	Michael Phelps	United States	4:03.84	Beijing	10 August 2008
European record	László Cseh	Hungary	4:06.16	Beijing	10 August 2008
Championship record	László Cseh	Hungary	4:09.59	Eindhoven	24 March 2008

== Results ==
=== Heats ===
The heats were started at 10:00.

Rank	Heat	Lane	Name	Nationality	Time	Notes
1	4	5	Dávid Verrasztó	Hungary	4:13.39	Q
2	4	3	Péter Bernek	Hungary	4:13.83	Q
3	4	4	Max Litchfield	Great Britain	4:13.87	Q
4	4	6	Joan Lluis Pons	Spain	4:14.16	Q
5	1	3	Alberto Razzetti	Italy	4:14.57	Q
6	3	4	Ilya Borodin	Russia	4:14.64	Q
7	3	7	Pier Andrea Matteazzi	Italy	4:14.70	Q
8	3	2	Maxim Stupin	Russia	4:15.58	Q
9	4	9	José Paulo Lopes	Portugal	4:17.22	
10	3	6	Arjan Knipping	Netherlands	4:17.47	
11	4	2	Maksym Shemberev	Azerbaijan	4:18.18	
12	2	4	Dominik Márk Török	Hungary	4:19.67	
13	3	1	Dawid Szwedzki	Poland	4:19.70	
14	3	0	Adam Paulsson	Sweden	4:20.22	
15	4	1	Richard Nagy	Slovakia	4:20.87	
16	3	8	Émilien Mattenet	France	4:22.07	
17	2	5	Marius Toscan	Switzerland	4:22.09	
18	3	5	Apostolos Papastamos	Greece	4:23.15	
19	3	3	Brodie Williams	Great Britain	4:23.81	
20	4	0	Dániel Sós	Hungary	4:24.29	
21	2	6	Daniil Giourtzidis	Greece	4:25.33	
22	2	2	Arthur Dalén Ellegaard	Denmark	4:26.25	
23	2	1	Maksym Holubnychyi	Ukraine	4:27.51	
24	2	3	Christoph Meier	Liechtenstein	4:27.54	
25	3	9	Danny Schmidt	Germany	4:27.99	
26	1	4	Tomáš Ludvík	Czech Republic	4:32.14	
27	1	5	Thomas Wareing	Malta	4:40.16	
	2	8	Jan Čejka	Czech Republic	Did not start	
	4	8	Anton Ipsen	Denmark	Did not start	
	4	7	Léon Marchand	France	Did not start	
	2	7	Tomoe Zenimoto Hvas	Norway	Did not start	

=== Final ===
The final was held at 18:42.

Rank	Lane	Name	Nationality	Time	Notes
1st place, gold medalist(s)	7	Ilya Borodin	Russia	4:10.02	WJ, NR
2nd place, silver medalist(s)	2	Alberto Razzetti	Italy	4:11.17	
3rd place, bronze medalist(s)	3	Max Litchfield	Great Britain	4:11.56	
4	4	Dávid Verrasztó	Hungary	4:12.15	
5	1	Pier Andrea Matteazzi	Italy	4:12.79	
6	5	Péter Bernek	Hungary	4:14.33	
7	6	Joan Lluis Pons	Spain	4:16.75	
8	8	Maxim Stupin	Russia	4:17.06	
