= 2021 FINA World Swimming Championships (25 m) – Men's 400 metre individual medley =

Swimming competition

Men's 400 metre individual medley at the 2021 FINA World Swimming Championships (25 m)
- Venue: Etihad Arena
- Location: Abu Dhabi, United Arab Emirates
- Dates: 20 December (heats and final)
- Competitors: 18 from 15 nations
- Winning time: 3:56.26

Medalists
gold medal	Daiya Seto	Japan
silver medal	Ilya Borodin
bronze medal	Carson Foster	United States

The Men's 400 metre individual medley competition of the 2021 FINA World Swimming Championships (25 m) was held on 20 December 2021.

== Records ==
Prior to the competition, the existing world and championship records were as follows.

World record	Daiya Seto (JPN)	3:54.81	Las Vegas, United States	20 December 2019
Competition record	Ryan Lochte (USA)	3:55.50	Dubai, United Arab Emirates	16 December 2010

== Results ==
=== Heats ===
The heats were started at 09:53.

Rank	Heat	Lane	Name	Nationality	Time	Notes
1	3	4	Daiya Seto	Japan	4:00.84	Q
2	3	1	Carson Foster	United States	4:02.63	Q
3	2	4	Ilya Borodin	Russian Swimming Federation	4:04.35	Q
4	2	2	Balázs Holló	Hungary	4:04.74	Q
5	2	0	Kieran Smith	United States	4:04.82	Q
6	2	5	Alberto Razzetti	Italy	4:05.05	Q
7	3	0	Eitan Ben Shitrit	Israel	4:07.55	Q
8	2	6	Brandonn Almeida	Brazil	4:08.29	Q
9	3	6	Andreas Vazaios	Greece	4:09.53	
10	3	8	Héctor Ruvalcaba	Mexico	4:10.83	NR
11	3	2	Daniil Pasynkov	Russian Swimming Federation	4:11.74	
12	1	4	Miguel Cancel	Puerto Rico	4:13.12	
13	1	5	Aflah Fadlan Prawira	Indonesia	4:13.61	NR
14	3	9	Erick Gordillo	Guatemala	4:14.58	NR
15	1	3	Nguyễn Hữu Kim Sơn	Vietnam	4:15.71	
16	3	7	Leonardo Coelho Santos	Brazil	4:19.16	
17	1	6	Simon Bachmann	Seychelles	4:30.97	
18	1	7	Rashad Alguliyev	Azerbaijan	4:32.30	
	1	2	Brandon Schuster	Samoa	DNS	
	2	1	Wang Shun	China	DNS	
	2	3	Tomoe Hvas	Norway	DNS	
	2	7	José Paulo Lopes	Portugal	DNS	
	2	8	Richard Nagy	Slovakia	DNS	
	2	9	Jaouad Syoud	Algeria	DNS	
	3	3	Max Litchfield	Great Britain	DNS	
	3	5	Duncan Scott	Great Britain	DNS	

=== Final ===
The final was held at 19:25.

Rank	Lane	Name	Nationality	Time	Notes
1st place, gold medalist(s)	4	Daiya Seto	Japan	3:56.26	
2nd place, silver medalist(s)	3	Ilya Borodin	Russian Swimming Federation	3:56.47	ER, WJ
3rd place, bronze medalist(s)	5	Carson Foster	United States	3:57.99	
4	7	Alberto Razzetti	Italy	3:59.57	NR
5	2	Kieran Smith	United States	4:03.29	
6	1	Eitan Ben Shitrit	Israel	4:08.31	
7	8	Brandonn Almeida	Brazil	4:08.77	
8	6	Balázs Holló	Hungary	4:11.26	
