= Daniil Pasynkov =

Russian swimmer

Personal information
- Full name: Daniil Valerievich Pasynkov
- National team: Russia
- Born: 13 October 1994 (age 31) Moscow, Russia

Sport
- Sport: Swimming
- Strokes: Freestyle, individual medley
- Club: Moscow City
Medal record
Men's swimming
Representing Russia
Event	1st	2nd	3rd
European Championships (SC)	0	0	1
Swimming World Cup	0	2	4
Total	0	2	5
European Championships (SC)
Bronze medal – third place	2019 Glasgow	400 m medley
Swimming World Cup
Silver medal – second place	2017 Hong Kong	400 m medley
Silver medal – second place	2017 Doha	200 m medley
Bronze medal – third place	2016 Berlin	400 m medley
Bronze medal – third place	2017 Hong Kong	200 m freestyle
Bronze medal – third place	2021 Kazan	200 m medley
Bronze medal – third place	2021 Kazan	400 m medley

Daniil Valerievich Pasynkov (born 13 October 1994) is a competitive Russian swimmer. He is a Russian record holder in the short course 200 metre individual medley. At the 2019 European Short Course Swimming Championships, he won the bronze medal in the 400 metre individual medley.

He won a gold medal in the 4×200 metre freestyle relay at the 2016 World Short Course Championships, swimming on the prelims relay. However, in 2022, Artem Lobuzov had his results on the relay disqualified by FINA, and the medal was re-allocated to the team from the United States.

== Background ==
Pasynkov was born 13 October 1994 in Russia. He trains as part of and competes for the Moscow city swim club. He attended the Moscow Automobile and Road Construction State Technical University in Moscow, where he studied traffic safety and organization.

== Career ==
=== 2016: World Championships gold medalist ===
When Pasynkov was 21 years old he competed at the 2016 Swimming World Cup stop in Berlin, Germany in August, winning the bronze medal in the 400 metre individual medley with a time of 4:11.50 and finishing behind two German swimmers, Philip Heintz and Marco Koch.

==== 2016 World Short Course Championships ====
2016 World Championships (SC)
Gold medal – first place	4×200 m freestyle	6:52.10 (h, DSQ in 2022)

At the 2016 World Short Course Championships in Windsor, Canada in December, Pasynkov placed tenth in the 200 metre individual medley with a time of 1:55.03 for his first event of the Championships. For his next event, he swam the lead-off leg of the 4×200 metre freestyle relay with a time of 1:45.37 in the prelims to help advance the relay to the final ranked fifth overall. When the Russian relay team won the gold medal in the final with a time of 6:52.10, Pasynkov also won a gold medal for his efforts in the prelims heats. In his final event of the Championships, Pasynkov was one of three swimmers disqualified in the prelims heats of the 400 metre individual medley.

=== 2017 ===
==== 2017 Swimming World Cup ====
2017 World Cup – Hong Kong
Silver medal – second place	400 m individual medley	4:10.61
Bronze medal – third place	200 m freestyle	1:45.85

Pasynkov won his first medal of the 2017 Swimming World Cup at the stop in Hong Kong on 30 September, where he finished second in the 400 metre individual medley behind Ayrton Sweeney of South Africa with a time of 4:10.61. In the prelims of the 200 metre freestyle the following day, Pasynkov qualified for the final of the event ranked second overall, ahead of Tom Shields of the United States and behind Kyle Stolk of the Netherlands. Later in the day, Pasynkov won his second medal of the World Cup stop, finishing third behind Chad le Clos of South Africa and Tom Shields with a time of 1:45.85 to earn the bronze medal while Kyle Stolk finished one-hundredth of a second behind Pasynkov to place fourth. Following up his competition at the World Cup stop in Hong Kong, Pasynkov placed first in the prelims heats of the 200 metre individual medley at the World Cup stop in Doha, Qatar at the Hamad Aquatic Centre, qualifying for the final with a time of 1:59.05, which was six-hundredths of a second ahead of the next-fastest prelims swimmer Kirill Prigoda also of Russia. In the final of the event, Pasynkov won the silver medal with a time of 1:56.56, finishing less than a second behind the first-place-finisher Kirill Prigoda.

=== 2018 ===
==== 2018 World Short Course Championships ====
At the 2018 World Short Course Championships held in Hangzhou, China in December, Pasynkov placed 16th in the prelims heats of the 400 metre individual medley with a time of 4:09.19.

=== 2019 ===
==== 2019 European Short Course Championships ====
2019 European Championships (SC)
Bronze medal – third place	400 m individual medley	4:04.98

At the 2019 European Short Course Swimming Championships held at the Tollcross International Swimming Centre in Glasgow, Scotland in December, Pasynkov won a bronze medal in the 400 metre individual medley with a time of 4:04.98, finishing only behind Max Litchfield of Great Britain and Ilya Borodin of Russia. This marked a time drop of over 2 seconds from the prelims heats, where Pasynkov swam a 4:07.26 to advance to the final ranked seventh overall. He also placed sixth in the final of the 200 metre individual medley with a time of 1:53.60.

==== 2019 Vladimir Salnikov Cup ====
On the 20th of December 2019, Pasynkov set a Russian record in the short course 200 metre individual medley with a personal best time of 1:53.26 at the 2019 Vladimir Salnikov Cup in Saint Petersburg. Pasynkov's new time broke the previous Russian record set by Kliment Kolesnikov in 2017 at 1:53.36.

=== 2021 ===
In July 2021, Pasynkov signed to compete as part of the Tokyo Frog Kings for the 2021 International Swimming League during the free agency period of team roster selection. On 26 September 2021, in a match against the Aqua Centurions, Team Iron, and the New York Breakers, Pasynkov swam a personal best time of 52.97 seconds in the 100 metre individual medley.

==== 2021 Swimming World Cup: Kazan ====
2021 World Cup – Kazan
Bronze medal – third place	200 m individual medley	1:53.67
Bronze medal – third place	400 m individual medley	4:06.01

At the stop of the 2021 Swimming World Cup held at the Palace of Water Sports in Kazan in October, Pasynkov qualified for the final of the 200 metre individual medley ranking fourth across all prelims heats with a time of 1:55.68. In the final of the 200 metre individual medley, Pasynkov swam a 1:53.67, finishing behind Daiya Seto of Japan and Matthew Sates of South Africa to win the bronze medal. For the 400 metre individual medley the next day, Pasynkov won the bronze medal with his time of 4:06.01, touching the wall third after Daiya Seto and Ilya Borodin.

==== 2021 European Short Course Championships ====
At the 2021 European Short Course Swimming Championships in Kazan in November, Pasynkov competed in two events, the 200 metre individual medley and the 100 metre individual medley. In the prelims heats of the 200 metre individual medley, Pasynkov qualified for the semifinals ranked first with a time of 1:55.72, which was five-hundredths of a second faster than second-ranked Andreas Vazaios of Greece. Later in the day, in the semifinals of the 200 metre individual medley, Pasynkov qualified for the final of the event with a time of 1:54.21 that ranked him third overall. The following day, Pasynkov placed fifth in the final of the 200 metre individual medley with a time of 1:54.20, finishing after one Greek swimmer, two Italian swimmers, and one Hungarian swimmer, which made him the highest placing Russian competitor in the event. In his second event, the 100 metre individual medley, Pasynkov ranked tenth in the prelims heats with a time of 53.24 seconds and did not advance to the semifinals as he was the third-fastest Russian and only the fastest two swimmers from a country could qualify for the semifinals.

==== 2021 World Short Course Championships ====
Pasynkov was named as part of the Russia contingent of swimmers for the 2021 World Short Course Championships in Abu Dhabi, United Arab Emirates at Etihad Arena. He and his fellow Russian teammates were not allowed to compete with their country name, anthem, nor flag per an ongoing Court of Arbitration for Sport ban against Russian representation at all World Championships between 17 December 2020 and 16 December 2022, instead they competed as the Russian Swimming Federation. For his first individual event at the championships, Pasynkov ranked 13th overall in the prelims heats of the 200 metre individual medley with a 1:55.02, was the only Russian to compete, and did not qualify for the final, finishing 1.01 seconds slower than Kieran Smith of the United States who got the last qualifying spot with a time of 1:54.01. For his second individual event, the 400 metre individual medley, Pasynkov ranked 11th with a time of 4:11.74 in the prelims heats on day five and did not qualify for the final.

=== 2022–2023: Teammate disqualified, stripped of his 2016 World Championships gold medal ===
On 3 March 2022, Pasynkov and all other Russian and Belarusian athletes were banned indefinitely, no end date communicated, from LEN competitions. Twenty-five days later, on 28 March 2022, FINA announced one of his relay teammates from the 2016 World Short Course Championships, Artem Lobuzov, was suspended for an anti-doping rule violation. The following month, Pasynkov and all other Russians and Belarusians received a second ban, this time from FINA, excluding them from all FINA competitions between 21 April 2022 and 31 December 2022, inclusive. Additionally, his, and all other Russians's, times achieved at any competition during the FINA ban did not count towards world records nor world rankings.

In June 2022, and during the suspension, FINA made a back-acting decision to disqualify Artem Lobuzov from his performance as part of the 2016 relay and re-allocate the gold medal to the formerly second-place team from the United States. A similar back-acting approach was made by a newly rebranded FINA in April 2023 (renamed as World Aquatics) that extended indefinitely its bans on Russian and Belarusian participation at its events.

== International championships (25 m) ==
Meet	100 individual medley	200 individual medley	400 individual medley	4×200 freestyle relay
WC 2016		10th	DSQ	(gold) , DSQ^{[a]}^{[b]}
WC 2018			16th	
EC 2019		6th	3rd place, bronze medalist(s)	—N/a
EC 2021	10th (h)	5th		—N/a
WC 2021		13th	11th	

^{a} Pasynkov swam only in the prelims heats.
^{b} The gold medal was re-allocated by FINA over five years after the performance, once they implemented a suspension on and disqualified the performances by relay team member Artem Lobuzov.

== Personal best times ==
=== Short course metres (25 m pool) ===
Event	Time	Meet	Location	Date	Notes	Ref
200 m freestyle	1:43.82	2019 Russian Short Course Championships	Kazan	6 November 2019		
100 m individual medley	52.97	2021 International Swimming League	Naples, Italy	26 September 2021		
200 m individual medley	1:53.26	2019 Vladimir Salnikov Cup	Saint Petersburg	20 December 2019	NR	
400 m individual medley	4:04.82	2018 Russian Short Course Championships	Kazan	11 November 2018		

Legend: NR – Russian record

== National records ==
=== Short course metres (25 m pool) ===
No.	Event	Time	Meet	Location	Date	Status	Ref
1	200 m individual medley	1:53.26	2019 Vladimir Salnikov Cup	Saint Petersburg	20 December 2019	Current	

== See also ==
- List of Russian records in swimming
- List of European Short Course Swimming Championships medalists (men)
