= 2021 FINA World Swimming Championships (25 m) – Men's 200 metre individual medley =

Swimming competition

Men's 200 metre individual medley at the 2021 FINA World Swimming Championships (25 m)
- Venue: Etihad Arena
- Location: Abu Dhabi, United Arab Emirates
- Dates: 16 December (heats and final)
- Competitors: 36 from 32 nations
- Winning time: 1:51.15

Medalists
gold medal	Daiya Seto	Japan
silver medal	Carson Foster	United States
bronze medal	Alberto Razzetti	Italy

The Men's 200 metre individual medley competition of the 2021 FINA World Swimming Championships (25 m) was held on 16 December 2021.

== Records ==
Prior to the competition, the existing world and championship records were as follows.

	Name	Nation	Time	Location	Date
World record Championship record	Ryan Lochte	United States	1:49.63	Istanbul	14 December 2012

== Results ==
=== Heats ===
The heats were started at 12:04.

Rank	Heat	Lane	Name	Nationality	Time	Notes
1	4	4	Daiya Seto	Japan	1:52.38	Q
2	3	1	Carson Foster	United States	1:52.59	Q
3	3	5	Alberto Razzetti	Italy	1:53.19	Q
4	3	4	Andreas Vazaios	Greece	1:53.38	Q
5	2	4	Duncan Scott	Great Britain	1:53.74	Q
6	2	6	Wang Shun	China	1:53.95	Q
7	3	3	Yakov Toumarkin	Israel	1:53.97	Q
8	2	7	Kieran Smith	United States	1:54.01	Q
9	2	5	Finlay Knox	Canada	1:54.22	
10	4	3	Caio Pumputis	Brazil	1:54.57	
11	2	3	Leonardo Coelho Santos	Brazil	1:54.63	
12	3	6	Max Litchfield	Great Britain	1:54.81	
13	4	6	Daniil Pasynkov	Russian Swimming Federation	1:55.02	
14	4	2	Mohamed Samy	Egypt	1:55.74	NR
15	4	7	Berke Saka	Turkey	1:55.87	
16	3	0	Mewen Tomac	France	1:55.93	
17	2	0	Kaloyan Bratanov	Bulgaria	1:56.28	NR
18	2	2	Louis Croenen	Belgium	1:56.64	
19	3	2	Hugo González	Spain	1:57.00	
20	4	8	Gábor Zombori	Hungary	1:57.07	
21	1	4	Jack McMillan	Ireland	1:57.13	
22	3	8	Vadym Naumenko	Ukraine	1:57.61	
23	1	5	Mark Munzer Kabbara	Lebanon	1:57.64	NR
24	2	1	Héctor Ruvalcaba	Mexico	1:58.17	
25	4	9	Miguel Cancel	Puerto Rico	1:58.86	NR
26	4	1	Qin Haiyang	China	1:59.04	
27	2	9	Trần Hưng Nguyên	Vietnam	1:59.82	
28	2	8	Ronens Kermans	Latvia	2:02.35	
29	3	9	Keanan Dols	Jamaica	2:04.50	
30	1	6	Tasi Limtiaco	Federated States of Micronesia	2:05.06	
31	1	3	Thomas Wareing	Malta	2:05.12	
32	1	0	Abdulrahman Al-Kulaibi	Oman	2:09.84	
33	1	2	José Manuel Campo	El Salvador	2:10.12	
34	1	7	Ahmed Al-Mutairy	Iraq	2:11.05	NR
35	1	1	Nasir Yahya Hussain	Nepal	2:11.85	NR
36	1	8	Kinley Lhendup	Bhutan	2:24.08	
	3	7	Maximillian Ang	Singapore	DNS	
	4	0	Noè Ponti	Switzerland	DNS	
	4	5	Tomoe Hvas	Norway	DNS	

=== Final ===
The final was held at 19:33.

Rank	Lane	Name	Nationality	Time	Notes
1st place, gold medalist(s)	4	Daiya Seto	Japan	1:51.15	
2nd place, silver medalist(s)	5	Carson Foster	United States	1:51.35	
3rd place, bronze medalist(s)	3	Alberto Razzetti	Italy	1:51.54	NR
4	6	Andreas Vazaios	Greece	1:51.94	
5	7	Wang Shun	China	1:53.41	
6	8	Kieran Smith	United States	1:53.76	
7	2	Duncan Scott	Great Britain	1:54.08	
8	1	Yakov Toumarkin	Israel	1:54.61	
