= List of Men's Swimming & Diving Academic All-America Team Members of the Year =

Student athlete award

Men's Swimming & Diving Academic All-America Team Members of the Year
- Awarded for: The yearly outstanding women's swimming & diving Academic All-America team member
- Country: United States and Canada
- Presented by: College Sports Communicators

History
- Most recent: Joshua Liendo, Florida, Alvaro Zornoza, Drury, Cooper Costello, Chicago, Ruthiik Satti, Cumberlands
- Next ceremony: April 2026
- Website: official site

The Men's Swimming & Diving Academic All-America Team Member of the Year is the annual most outstanding singular swimming & diving athlete of the set of male swimming & diving athletes selected for the Academic All-America Teams in a given year.

== Four-division era (2023–present) ==
Key
†	Indicates winners of the all-sports Academic All-America award.

All winners are American unless indicated otherwise.

Men's Swimming & Diving Academic All-America Team Members of the Year (2023–present)
Year	Division I		Division II		Division III		College/NAIA (Note: College Division, 2011–19; NAIA, 2018–present)	
Year	Winner	School	Winner	School	Winner	School	Winner	School
2023	Andrew Capobianco	Indiana	(Italy) Matteo Zampese	Florida Southern	Kellen Roddy	Johns Hopkins	(Spain) Alberto Garcia Marcos	Keiser
2024	Jonny Kulow	Arizona State	(Australia) Kyle Micallef	Florida Southern	Noah Hargrove	Kenyon	(Spain) Fabio Martin Rojo	Lindsey Wilson
2025	Jonny Kulow	Arizona State	(Germany) Cedric Büssing	Indianapolis	Vineet Ranade	Rose–Hulman	(Colombia) Juan Gonzalez	Keiser
2026	(Canada) Joshua Liendo	Florida	(Spain) Alvaro Zornoza	Drury	Cooper Costello	Chicago	(India) Ruthiik Satti	Cumberlands
