= 2026 Pan Pacific Swimming Championships – Men's 400 metre individual medley =

Competitive international swimming event

Men's 400 metre individual medley at the 2026 Pan Pacific Swimming Championships
- Venue: William Woollett Jr. Aquatics Center
- Dates: 13 August (heats & finals)
- Competitors: 16 from 7 nations

The men's 400 metre individual medley competition at the 2026 Pan Pacific Swimming Championships took place on August 13 at the William Woollett Jr. Aquatics Center. The defending champion was Chase Kalisz of the United States.

== Records ==
Prior to this competition, the existing world and Pan Pacific records were as follows:

World record	Leon Marchand (FRA)	4:02.50	Fukuoka, Japan	23 July 2023
Pan Pacific Championships record	Ryan Lochte (USA)	4:07.59	Irvine, United States	19 August 2010

== Results ==
All times are in minutes and seconds.

KEY:	QA	Qualified A Final	QB	Qualified B Final	CR	Championships record	NR	National record

=== Heats ===
The first round was held on 13 August from 10:21.

Only two swimmers from each country may advance to the A or B final. If a country not qualify any swimmer to the A final, that same country may qualify up to three swimmers to the B final.

Rank	Heat	Lane	Swimmer	Nation	Time	Notes
1	1	4	Tomoyuki Matsushita	Japan	4:07.61	QA
2	1	3	Yumeki Kojima	Japan	4:08.69	QSO, WJ
2	1	5	Asaki Nishikawa	Japan	4:08.69	QSO
4	2	4	Carson Foster	United States	4:11.55	QA
5	1	6	William Petric	Australia	4:11.86	QA
6	2	5	Bobby Finke	United States	4:12.17	QA
7	2	3	Lewis Clareburt	New Zealand	4:13.33	QA
8	2	6	Rex Maurer	United States	4:13.76	QB
9	2	2	Lorne Wigginton	Canada	4:14.23	QA
10	1	2	Tristan Jankovics	Canada	4:15.87	QA
11	1	7	Se-Bom Lee	Australia	4:17.03	QB
12	2	7	Brendon Smith	Australia	4:17.64	QB, WD
13	2	1	Aiden Kirk	Canada	4:28.05	QB
14	1	1	Gian Santos	Philippines	4:30.19	QB
15	2	8	Cameron Casali	South Africa	4:39.31	QB
16	1	8	Kai Whelan	South Africa	4:44.83	QB

Swim-off

A swim-off was held to determine the second Japanese qualifier for the A Final.

Rank	Lane	Swimmer	Nation	Time	Notes
1	5	Asaki Nishikawa	Japan	4:13.84	QA
2	4	Yumeki Kojima	Japan	4:27.43	QB

=== B Final ===
The finals were held on 13 August from 19:17.

Rank	Lane	Name	Nationality	Time	Notes
9	3	Rex Maurer	United States	4:12.49	
10	5	Se-Bom Lee	Australia	4:14.72	
11	4	Yumeki Kojima	Japan	4:23.99	
12	6	Aiden Kirk	Canada	4:24.91	
13	7	Cameron Casali	South Africa	4:34.55	
14	1	Kai Whelan	South Africa	4:37.50	
—	2	Gian Santos	Philippines	DSQ	

=== A Final ===
Rank	Lane	Name	Nationality	Time	Notes
1st place, gold medalist(s)	4	Tomoyuki Matsushita	Japan	4:06.75	CR
2nd place, silver medalist(s)	3	Carson Foster	United States	4:07.11	
3rd place, bronze medalist(s)	2	Bobby Finke	United States	4:07.59	
4	5	Asaki Nishikawa	Japan	4:08.82	
5	6	William Petric	Australia	4:09.24	NR
6	7	Lewis Clareburt	New Zealand	4:09.86	
7	8	Tristan Jankovics	Canada	4:14.14	
8	1	Lorne Wigginton	Canada	4:14.94	
