= Swimming at the 2026 Asian Games – Men's 200 metre individual medley =

Men's 200 metre individual medley at the 2026 Asian Games
- Venue: Tokyo Aquatics Centre
- Date: 20 September 2026
- Competitors: 30 from 19 nations

Medalists
gold medal	Tomoyuki Matsushita	Japan
silver medal	Yumeki Kojima	Japan
bronze medal	Wang Shun	China

The men's 200 metre individual medley event at the 2026 Asian Games took place on 20 September 2026 at the Tokyo Aquatics Centre.

== Schedule ==
All times are Japan Standard Time (UTC+09:00)

Date	Time	Event
Sunday, 20 September 2026	10:08	Heats
Sunday, 20 September 2026	17:09	Final

== Records ==
Prior to this competition, the existing world, Asian and Games records were as follows.

World Record	Leon Marchand (FRA)	1:52.69	Singapore	30 July 2025
Asian Record	Wang Shun (CHN)	1:54.62	Hangzhou, China	24 September 2023
Games Record	Wang Shun (CHN)	1:54.62	Hangzhou, China	24 September 2023

== Results ==
=== Heats ===
Rank	Heat	Athlete	Time	Notes
1	3	Tomoyuki Matsushita (JPN)	1:58.56	Q
2	1	Yumeki Kojima (JPN)	1:59.91	Q
3	2	Wang Shun (CHN)	2:00.04	Q
4	2	Kim Ji-hun (KOR)	2:00.06	Q
5	1	Reagan Cheng (SGP)	2:01.25	Q
6	1	Kim Min-suk (KOR)	2:01.28	Q
7	2	Aibat Myrzamuratov (KAZ)	2:01.43	Q
8	2	Fu Kun-ming (TPE)	2:01.63	Q
9	3	Wang Hsing-hao (TPE)	2:01.70	Q
10	3	Xie Yichen (CHN)	2:01.72	Q
11	3	Trần Hưng Nguyên (VIE)	2:02.01	Reserve
12	1	Gian Santos (PHI)	2:02.20	Reserve
13	1	Mohamed Mohamed (QAT)	2:02.51	NR
14	3	Nguyễn Quang Thuấn (VIE)	2:02.78	
15	2	Tsz Lam Lo (HKG)	2:03.93	
16	1	Russel Pang (SGP)	2:04.27	
17	2	Khai Xin Tan (MAS)	2:04.64	
18	3	Skye Sharples (THA)	2:05.10	
19	3	Dongqi Yu (HKG)	2:06.15	
20	1	Liquor Harrison Andoko (INA)	2:06.59	
21	3	Pasawat Kantakom (THA)	2:06.72	
22	1	Khaled Alotaibi (KUW)	2:07.14	
23	2	Salem Sabt (UAE)	2:12.61	
24	2	Enkhmend Enkhmend (MGL)	2:13.21	
25	3	Pieter Sok Kha Vanoosten (CAM)	2:14.71	
26	1	Cheng Tong Fok (MAC)	2:17.53	
27	3	Mohamed Alyammahi (UAE)	2:18.44	
28	1	Tselmeg Khash-erdene (MGL)	2:24.24	
	2	Munzer Mark Kabbara (LBN)	DNS	
	2	Goh Li Jie (MAS)	DSQ	

=== Final ===
Rank	Athlete	Time	Notes
1st place, gold medalist(s)	Tomoyuki Matsushita (JPN)	1:55.30	
2nd place, silver medalist(s)	Yumeki Kojima (JPN)	1:55.36	WJ
3rd place, bronze medalist(s)	Wang Shun (CHN)	1:57.14	
4	Kim Min-suk (KOR)	1:59.69	
5	Xie Yichen (CHN)	1:59.74	
6	Kim Ji-hun (KOR)	1:59.78	
7	Aibat Myrzamuratov (KAZ)	2:00.37	NR
8	Wang Hsing-hao (TPE)	2:01.21	
9	Fu Kun-ming (TPE)	2:02.07	
10	Reagan Cheng (SGP)	2:02.65	
