= Swimming at the 2026 Asian Games – Men's 400 metre individual medley =

Men's 400 metre individual medley at the 2026 Asian Games
- Venue: Tokyo Aquatics Centre
- Date: 22 September 2026
- Competitors: 24 from 14 nations

Medalists
| gold medal | Yumeki Kojima | Japan |
| silver medal | Tomoyuki Matsushita | Japan |
| bronze medal | Wang Shun | China |

The men's 400 metre individual medley event at the 2026 Asian Games took place on 22 September 2026 at the Tokyo Aquatics Centre.

== Schedule ==
All times are Japan Standard Time (UTC+09:00)

| Date | Time | Event |
|---|---|---|
| Tuesday, 22 September 2026 | 10:12 | Heats |
| Tuesday, 22 September 2026 | 17:08 | Final |

== Records ==
Prior to this competition, the existing world, Asian and Games records were as follows.

| World Record | Léon Marchand (FRA) | 4:02.50 | Fukuoka, Japan | 23 July 2023 |
| Asian Record | Tomoyuki Matsushita (JPN) | 4:05.83 | Kadoma, Japan | 3 September 2026 |
| Games Record | Kosuke Hagino (JPN) | 4:07.75 | Incheon, South Korea | 24 September 2014 |

== Results ==
=== Heats ===
| Rank | Heat | Athlete | Time | Notes |
|---|---|---|---|---|
| 1 | 3 | Tomoyuki Matsushita (JPN) | 4:21.05 | Q |
| 2 | 2 | Yumeki Kojima (JPN) | 4:21.54 | Q |
| 3 | 2 | Kim Min-suk (KOR) | 4:21.80 | Q |
| 4 | 3 | Wang Shun (CHN) | 4:23.17 | Q |
| 5 | 3 | Gu Enyi (CHN) | 4:23.23 | Q |
| 6 | 2 | Nguyễn Quang Thuận (VIE) | 4:23.55 | Q |
| 7 | 3 | Kim Min-seop (KOR) | 4:23.75 | Q |
| 8 | 2 | Gian Santos (PHI) | 4:24.25 | Q |
| 9 | 3 | Trần Hưng Nguyễn (VIE) | 4:24.33 | Q |
| 10 | 2 | Tan Khai Xin (MAS) | 4:24.38 | Q |
| 11 | 3 | Reagan Cheng (SGP) | 4:28.08 | Reserve |
| 12 | 2 | Wang Hsing-hao (TPE) | 4:28.74 | Reserve |
| 13 | 3 | Khaled Alotaibi (KUW) | 4:28.75 | |
| 14 | 3 | Wang Yi Shun (HKG) | 4:29.17 | |
| 15 | 2 | Skye Sharples (THA) | 4:29.97 | |
| 16 | 2 | Fu Kun-ming (TPE) | 4:32.54 | |
| 17 | 3 | Lo Tsz Lam (HKG) | 4:33.14 | |
| 18 | 2 | Goh Li Jie (MAS) | 4:52.72 | |
| 19 | 3 | Pieter Sok Kha Vanoosten (CAM) | 4:52.81 | |
| 20 | 1 | Turmunkh Duurenbayar (MGL) | 5:06.67 | |
| 21 | 1 | Mohamed Shiham (MDV) | 5:06.92 | |
| 22 | 2 | Abdulla Alameri (UAE) | 5:09.73 | |
| 23 | 1 | Tselmeg Khash-erdene (MGL) | 5:24.93 | |
| | 1 | Munzer Mark Kabbara (LBN) | DNS | |

=== Final ===
| Rank | Athlete | Time | Notes |
|---|---|---|---|
| 1st place, gold medalist(s) | Yumeki Kojima (JPN) | 4:07.02 | GR |
| 2nd place, silver medalist(s) | Tomoyuki Matsushita (JPN) | 4:09.64 | |
| 3rd place, bronze medalist(s) | Wang Shun (CHN) | 4:14.59 | |
| 4 | Gu Enyi (CHN) | 4:16.02 | |
| 5 | Trần Hưng Nguyễn (VIE) | 4:17.57 | |
| 6 | Kim Min-suk (KOR) | 4:17.96 | |
| 7 | Nguyễn Quang Thuận (VIE) | 4:18.57 | |
| 8 | Kim Min-seop (KOR) | 4:20.31 | |
| 9 | Tan Khai Xin (MAS) | 4:23.99 | |
| 10 | Gian Santos (PHI) | 4:25.90 | |
