= 2024 World Aquatics Swimming Championships (25 m) – Men's 400 metre freestyle =

Swimming competition

Men's 400 metre freestyle at the 2024 World Aquatics Swimming Championships (25 m)
- Venue: Duna Arena
- Location: Budapest, Hungary
- Dates: 12 December (heats and final)
- Competitors: 49 from 46 nations
- Winning time: 3:35.89

Medalists
gold medal	Elijah Winnington	Australia
silver medal	Carson Foster	United States
silver medal	Kieran Smith	United States

The men's 400 metre freestyle event at the 2024 World Aquatics Swimming Championships (25 m) was held on 12 December 2024 at the Duna Arena in Budapest, Hungary.

== Records ==
Prior to the competition, the existing world and championship records were as follows.

World record	Yannick Agnel (FRA)	3:32.25	Angers, France	15 November 2012
Competition record	Danas Rapšys (LTU)	3:34.01	Hangzhou, China	11 December 2018

== Background ==
Two medalists from the 2022 Short Course World Championships in Melbourne returned for the event in Budapest: the USA's defending champion Kieran Smith and Lithuania's bronze medalist Danas Rapšys. Smith won gold in Melbourne with a lifetime best of 3:34.38 and had swum the fastest in the 2024 season with a 3:36.97 from the Singapore World Cup stop. Rapšys, a former gold medalist in 2018, entered with a 2024 season best of 3:37.31, also from the World Cup circuit. Belgium's Lucas Henveaux, bronze medalist at the 2023 European Short Course Championships, held the second-fastest time among entrants at 3:37.23. Other sub-3:40 swimmers included Ahmed Jaouadi of Tunisia (3:38.74), Xu Yizhou of China (3:38.81), and Roman Fuchs of France (3:39.55). Olympic champion Lukas Märtens and 2022 long-course world champion Elijah Winnington also featured, though neither had recent short-course results. Additional contenders included Antonio Djaković, a 2021 Worlds bronze medalist, and Carson Foster of the USA. Bulgaria's Petar Mitsin, the long-course junior world record holder, entered with a short-course best of 3:41.19.

SwimSwam predicted Winnington would win, Märtens would take second, and Henveaux would come third.

== Results ==
=== Heats ===
The heats were started at 10:29.

Rank	Heat	Lane	Name	Nationality	Time	Notes
1	5	8	Elijah Winnington	Australia	3:37.22	Q
2	4	8	Carson Foster	United States	3:37.86	Q
3	5	4	Lucas Henveaux	Belgium	3:37.87	Q
4	6	2	Zalán Sárkány	Hungary	3:38.43	Q
5	5	6	Roman Fuchs	France	3:38.51	Q
6	6	3	Ahmed Jaouadi	Tunisia	3:38.57	Q
7	5	1	Petar Mitsin	Bulgaria	3:38.94	Q, NR
8	6	4	Kieran Smith	United States	3:39.14	Q
9	6	5	Danas Rapšys	Lithuania	3:39.60	R
10	6	6	Victor Johansson	Sweden	3:39.85	R
11	4	6	Kamil Sieradzki	Poland	3:40.29	
12	6	7	Savelii Luzin	Neutral Athletes B	3:40.33	
13	6	0	Luca De Tullio	Italy	3:41.50	
14	6	8	Kaito Tabuchi	Japan	3:41.58	
15	5	7	Dimitrios Markos	Greece	3:41.95	
16	4	4	Carlos Garach	Spain	3:42.18	
17	3	4	Sašo Boškan	Slovenia	3:42.93	
18	3	3	Alex Axon	Canada	3:43.64	
18	5	5	Antonio Djakovic	Switzerland	3:43.64	
20	4	2	Juan Morales	Colombia	3:44.03	
21	4	5	Nathan Wiffen	Ireland	3:44.05	
22	5	9	Roman Akimov	Neutral Athletes B	3:44.25	
23	6	9	Khiew Hoe Yean	Malaysia	3:44.69	
24	5	3	Xu Yizhou	China	3:44.90	
25	4	3	Arno Kruger	South Africa	3:45.28	
26	3	0	Joaquín Vargas	Peru	3:46.16	
27	3	2	Ben Littlejohn	New Zealand	3:47.53	
28	2	2	Niko Janković	Croatia	3:47.77	
29	5	0	Kim Jun-woo	South Korea	3:48.09	
30	4	1	Galymzhan Balabek	Kazakhstan	3:48.31	
31	3	6	Andrei Proca	Romania	3:48.87	
32	4	0	José Paulo Lopes	Portugal	3:49.11	
33	3	8	Richard Nagy	Slovakia	3:50.21	
34	4	7	Muhammed Yusuf Özden	Turkey	3:50.35	
35	6	1	Lee Ho-joon	South Korea	3:50.75	
36	2	4	Kenan Dračić	Bosnia and Herzegovina	3:50.77	
37	3	5	Caleb Romero	Puerto Rico	3:51.15	
38	2	1	Adrian Eichler	Philippines	3:51.62	NR
39	3	7	Wang Yi Shun	Hong Kong	3:52.96	
40	2	6	Nikola Gjuretanovski	North Macedonia	3:53.05	NR
41	4	9	Liggjas Joensen	Faroe Islands	3:53.46	
42	2	3	Kevin Teixeira	Andorra	3:53.69	NR
43	2	5	Omar Abbass	Syria	3:53.79	
44	3	9	Chirill Chirsanov	Moldova	3:55.33	
45	2	7	Alberto Vega	Costa Rica	3:55.71	NR
46	2	0	Timothy Leberl	Mauritius	4:02.51	
47	1	4	Vladimir Hernández	Cuba	4:07.02	
48	2	9	Andile Bekker	Botswana	4:09.55	
49	2	8	Arion Budima	Kosovo	4:10.76	
	1	3	Atharva Singh	Nepal	Did not start	
	1	5	Ali Jaafar	Iraq	Did not start	
	3	1	Max Litchfield	Great Britain	Did not start	

=== Final ===
The final was held at 19:13.

Rank	Lane	Name	Nationality	Time	Notes
1st place, gold medalist(s)	4	Elijah Winnington	Australia	3:35.89	
2nd place, silver medalist(s)	5	Carson Foster	United States	3:36.31	
2nd place, silver medalist(s)	8	Kieran Smith	United States	3:36.31	
4	3	Lucas Henveaux	Belgium	3:36.71	
5	2	Roman Fuchs	France	3:38.31	
6	6	Zalán Sárkány	Hungary	3:38.59	
7	7	Ahmed Jaouadi	Tunisia	3:39.32	
8	1	Petar Mitsin	Bulgaria	3:41.46	
