= Swimming at the 2022 European Aquatics Championships – Men's 400 metre individual medley =

Men's 400 metre individual medley at the 2022 European Aquatics Championships
- Venue: Foro Italico
- Dates: 11 August
- Competitors: 19 from 16 nations
- Winning time: 4:10.60

Medalists
gold medal	Alberto Razzetti	Italy
silver medal	Dávid Verrasztó	Hungary
bronze medal	Pier Andrea Matteazzi	Italy

The Men's 400 metre individual medley competition of the 2022 European Aquatics Championships was held on 11 August 2022.

== Records ==
Prior to the competition, the existing world, European and championship records were as follows.

	Name	Nation	Time	Location	Date
World record	Michael Phelps	United States	4:03.84	Beijing	10 August 2008
European record	Léon Marchand	France	4:04.28	Budapest	18 June 2022
Championship record	László Cseh	Hungary	4:09.59	Eindhoven	24 March 2008

== Results ==
=== Heats ===
The heats were started at 09:28.

Rank	Heat	Lane	Name	Nationality	Time	Notes
1	2	4	Dávid Verrasztó	Hungary	4:15.52	Q
2	2	5	Joan Lluís Pons	Spain	4:16.17	Q
3	1	4	Alberto Razzetti	Italy	4:17.21	Q
4	2	3	Hubert Kós	Hungary	4:17.22	Q
5	1	5	Pier Andrea Matteazzi	Italy	4:17.36	Q
6	2	1	Thomas Jansen	Netherlands	4:18.43	Q
7	2	6	Émilien Mattenet	France	4:19.20	Q
8	1	6	Richard Nagy	Slovakia	4:19.75	Q
9	1	7	Daniil Giourtzidis	Greece	4:19.97	
10	2	8	Jon Jøntvedt	Norway	4:20.40	
11	1	3	Brodie Williams	Great Britain	4:20.55	
12	1	1	Marius Toscan	Switzerland	4:20.87	
13	1	2	Eitan Ben Shitrit	Israel	4:21.22	
14	2	2	Marius Zobel	Germany	4:22.32	
15	1	8	Krzysztof Chmielewski	Poland	4:24.78	
16	2	7	Anže Ferš Eržen	Slovenia	4:26.10	
17	2	0	William Lulek	Sweden	4:26.15	
18	2	9	František Jablčník	Slovakia	4:26.32	
19	1	0	Liam Custer	Ireland	4:31.43	
	1	9	Zhulian Lavdaniti	Albania	Did not start	

=== Final ===
The final was held at 18:16.

Rank	Lane	Name	Nationality	Time	Notes
1st place, gold medalist(s)	3	Alberto Razzetti	Italy	4:10.60	
2nd place, silver medalist(s)	4	Dávid Verrasztó	Hungary	4:12.58	
3rd place, bronze medalist(s)	2	Pier Andrea Matteazzi	Italy	4:13.29	
4	6	Hubert Kós	Hungary	4:13.77	
5	5	Joan Lluís Pons	Spain	4:14.31	
6	7	Thomas Jansen	Netherlands	4:18.42	
7	1	Émilien Mattenet	France	4:19.36	
8	8	Richard Nagy	Slovakia	4:22.98	
