= Swimming at the 2017 European Youth Summer Olympic Festival =

Swimming at the 2017 European Youth Summer Olympic Festival was held in July 2017 in Győr, Hungary.

== Medal events ==
=== Boys' events ===
Games	Gold		Silver		Bronze	
50m Freestyle	Federico Burdisso; Italy	22.79	Louis Godefroid; France	23.57	Arsenii Chivilev; Russia	23.59
100m Freestyle	Andrei Minakov; Russia	50.23 EYOF	Robin Hanson; Sweden	50.71	Thomas Ceccon; Italy	50.85
200m Freestyle	Robin Hanson; Sweden	1:49.34	Maksim Aleksandrov; Russia	1:49.76	Antonio Djakovic; Switzerland	1:50.05
400m Freestyle	Hugo Sagnes; France	3:51.98 EYOF	Maksim Aleksandrov; Russia	3:52.73	Antonio Djakovic; Switzerland	3:53.70
1500m Freestyle	Michele Sassi; Italy	15:41.06	Sven Schwarz; Germany	15:41.94	Szilárd Galyassy; Hungary	15:42.04
100m Backstroke	Egor Dolomanov; Russia	56.18	Gábor Zombori; Hungary	56.38	Jan Čejka; Czech Republic	56.65
200m Backstroke	Gábor Zombori; Hungary	2:02.17 EYOF	Egor Dolomanov; Russia	2:02.51	Mewen Tomac; France	2:03.10
100m Breaststroke	Vladislav Gerasimenko; Russia	1:02.20	Caspar Corbeau; Netherlands	1:03.42	Demirkan Demir; Turkey	1:03.62
200m Breaststroke	Caspar Corbeau; Netherlands	2:17.43	Demirkan Demir; Turkey	2:17.44	Savvas Thomoglou; Greece	2:17.49
100m Butterfly	Andrei Minakov; Russia	52.06 EYOF	Noè Ponti; Switzerland	52.89	Federico Burdisso; Italy	53.85
200m Butterfly	Federico Burdisso; Italy	1:58.65	Egor Pavlov; Russia	1:58.89	Noè Ponti; Switzerland	2:00.03
200m Medley	Thomas Ceccon; Italy	2:02.35 EYOF	Noè Ponti; Switzerland	2:03.59	Clément Bidard; France	2:03.83
400m Medley	Apostolos Papastamos; Greece	4:21.92 EYOF	Danil Zaitsev; Russia	4:23.99	Charlie Hutchison; Great Britain	4:25.90
4 × 100 m Freestyle Relay	Russia; Arsenii Chivilev (51.10); Maksim Aleksandrov (51.56); Maksim Fofanov (51.99); Andrei Minakov (50.38)	3:25.03 EYOF	Italy; Thomas Ceccon (50.56); Michele Sassi (53.17); Giulio Ciavarella (53.65); Federico Burdisso (50.20)	3:27.58	Sweden; Johan Rydahl (52.38); Linus Kahl (52.46); Robin Hanson (50.25); Oliver Rehn (52.59)	3:27.68
4 × 100 m Medley Relay	Russia; Egor Dolomanov (57.24); Vladislav Gerasimenko (1:02.37); Andrei Minakov (52.90); Arsenii Chivilev (50.50)	3:43.01 EYOF	Israel; David Gerchik (57.95); Ron Polonsky (1:04.16); Gal Cohen Groumi (53.80); Michael Smirnov (50.69)	3:46.60	Italy; Giulio Ciavarella (58.36); Fabio Coppola (1:04.75); Federico Burdisso (53.86); Thomas Ceccon (49.76)	3:46.73
EYOF = Championships Record NR = National Record

=== Girls' events ===
Games	Gold		Silver		Bronze	
50m Freestyle	Costanza Cocconcelli; Italy	25.82	Polina Nevmovenko; Russia; Gloria Muzito; Sweden	26.06	Not awarded	
100m Freestyle	Polina Nevmovenko; Russia	56.30	Karoline Barrett; Denmark	56.52	Ana-Iulia Dascăl; Romania	56.63
200m Freestyle	Polina Nevmovenko; Russia	2:02.45	Nadia González; Spain	2:02.76	Fanni Fábián; Hungary	2:02.85
400m Freestyle	Sara Račnik; Slovenia	4:15.54	Aleksandra Knop; Poland	4:17.01	Fanni Fábián; Hungary	4:17.12
800m Freestyle	Sara Račnik; Slovenia	8:42.70 EYOF	Réka Nagy; Hungary	8:44.63	Fanni Fábián; Hungary	8:51.48
100m Backstroke	Daria Vaskina; Russia	1:00.87 EYOF	Anastasiya Shkurdai; Belarus	1:01.76	Costanza Cocconcelli; Italy	1:02.14
200m Backstroke	Daria Vaskina; Russia	2:11.67 EYOF	Claudia Espinosa; Spain	2:13.42	Eszter Szabó-Feltóthy; Hungary	2:13.80
100m Breaststroke	Anastasia Makarova; Russia	1:08.96	Réka Vécsei; Hungary	1:09.40	Thea Blomsterberg; Denmark	1:09.83
200m Breaststroke	Thea Blomsterberg; Denmark	2:28.15 EYOF	Réka Vécsei; Hungary	2:30.24	Olga Turchina; Russia	2:31.06
100m Butterfly	Anastasiya Shkurdai; Belarus	59.34 EYOF	Lorena Jerebić; Croatia	1:00.49	Aleyna Özkan; Turkey	1:01.12
200m Butterfly	Blanka Berecz; Hungary	2:11.26 EYOF	Ana María Lamberto; Spain	2:11.78	Rosalie Kleyboldt; Germany	2:14.80
200m Medley	Réka Nagy; Hungary	2:14.80 EYOF	Lea Polonsky; Israel	2:16.19	Costanza Cocconcelli; Italy	2:16.68
400m Medley	Réka Nagy; Hungary	4:48.11	Martina Ratti; Italy	4:52.09	Giulia Goerigk; Germany	4:53.38
4 × 100 m Freestyle Relay	Russia; Polina Nevmovenko (56.39); Anastasia Makarova (57.66); Olga Turchina (58.15); Elizaveta Ryndych (56.85)	3:49.05	Netherlands; Nienke Jonk (57.63); Britta Koehorst (57.44); Elise Tanis (57.40); Imani de Jong (56.90)	3:49.37	Hungary; Fanni Fábián (57.37); Zsófia Muzsnay (57.73); Kiara Pózvai (57.72); Réka Nagy (56.83)	3:49.65
4 × 100 m Medley Relay	Russia; Daria Vaskina (1:00.89); Anastasia Makarova (1:09.77); Iana Sattarova (1:01.49); Polina Nevmovenko (55.84)	4:07.99 EYOF	Hungary; Fanni Matula (1:03.33); Réka Vécsei (1:10.05); Dora Hathazi (1:01.80); Réka Nagy (56.39)	4:11.57	Denmark; Sofie Hansen (1:04.15); Thea Blomsterberg (1:10.25); Karoline Barrett (1:01.27); Elisabeth Sabro Ebbesen (56.40)	4:12.07
EYOF = Championships Record NR = National Record

=== Mixed events ===
Games	Gold		Silver		Bronze	
4 × 100 m Freestyle Relay	Russia; Andrei Minakov (50.75); Arsenii Chivilev (50.76); Elizaveta Ryndych (56.80); Polina Nevmovenko (55.24)	3:33.55 EYOF	Italy; Federico Burdisso (50.71); Thomas Ceccon (50.76); Sofia Morini (56.13); Costanza Cocconcelli (56.73)	3:34.33	Sweden; Robin Hanson (51.19); Johan Rydahl (51.91); Gloria Muzito (56.83); Emilia Rönningdal (58.43)	3:38.36
4 × 100 m Medley Relay	Russia; Daria Vaskina (1:01.87); Vladislav Gerasimenko (1:01.09); Andrei Minakov (53.00); Polina Nevmovenko (56.02)	3:51.98 EYOF	Israel; David Gerchik (57.69); Lea Polonsky (1:10.98); Gal Cohen Groumi (54.53); Anastasia Gorbenko (56.79)	3:59.99	Hungary; Gábor Zombori (57.32); Sebestyén Böhm (1:03.95); Dóra Hatházi (1:01.73); Réka Nagy (57.34)	4:00.34
EYOF = Championships Record NR = National Record
