= Tomoyuki Matsushita =

Japanese swimmer (born 2005)

Personal information
- Born: 1 August 2005 (age 21) Utsunomiya, Japan
- Height: 1.83 m (6 ft 0 in)

Sport
- Sport: Swimming
Medal record
Men's swimming
Representing Japan
Olympic Games
Silver medal – second place	2024 Paris	400 m medley
World Championships (LC)
Silver medal – second place	2025 Singapore	400 m medley
Asian Games
Gold medal – first place	2026 Aichi–Nagoya	200 m medley
Silver medal – second place	2026 Aichi–Nagoya	400 m medley
Silver medal – second place	2026 Aichi–Nagoya	4×200 m freestyle
Pan Pacific Championships
Gold medal – first place	2026 Irvine	200 m medley
Gold medal – first place	2026 Irvine	400 m medley
Bronze medal – third place	2026 Irvine	4×200 m freestyle
World Junior Championships
Gold medal – first place	2023 Netanya	400 m medley
Silver medal – second place	2022 Lima	200 m medley

Tomoyuki Matsushita (Japanese: 松下知之, Hepburn: Matsushita Tomoyuki); born 1 August 2005) is a Japanese swimmer. He competed at the 2024 Summer Olympics and won the silver medal in the 400m individual medley event.

== Early life and education ==
Matsushita was born on 1 August 2005. He grew up in Utsunomiya, where he attended Yokokawa Nishi Elementary School and Yonan Junior High School; he later attended Tochigi Prefectural Utsunomiya Minami High School in Tochigi. He swam for a club in Utsunomiya and later enrolled at Toyo University, where he received training under coach Norimasa Hirai, who also coached Olympic gold medalist Kosuke Hagino, one of Matsushita's favorite swimmers.

== Career ==
Matsushita, whose first experience in swimming came at age one, won his first swimming competition in junior high school. In 2022, he competed at the Junior Pan Pacific Swimming Championships and won four medals, including individual medals in the 200m individual medley (silver) and 100m butterfly (bronze). Later that year, he competed at the 2022 FINA World Junior Swimming Championships and won silver in the 200m individual medley. The following year, he was selected for the 2023 World Aquatics Junior Swimming Championships, where he won the gold medal in the 400m individual medley while setting the championship record in the event with a time of 4:10.97.

In March 2024, Matsushita became the first Japanese swimmer to qualify for the 2024 Summer Olympics, winning gold at the Japanese Olympic trials in the 400m individual medley while beating out previous Olympic medalists Tomoru Honda and Daiya Seto. At the Olympics, Matsushita was the youngest participant in the event but reached the finals, where he won the silver medal, only behind gold medalist Léon Marchand of France.

He set his first world record in the Japanese short course championships in the 400 individual medley with a time of 3:54.33, breaking countryman's Daiya Seto's previous world record.
