= Pier Andrea Matteazzi =

Italian swimmer (born 1997)

Personal information
- Nationality: Italian
- Born: 5 December 1997 (age 28) Vicenza, Italy

Sport
- Sport: Swimming
- Strokes: Freestyle
- Club: Centro Sportivo Olimpico dell'Esercito
Medal record
Men's swimming
Representing Italy
European Championships (LC)
Bronze medal – third place	2022 Rome	400 m medley
Mediterranean Games
Gold medal – first place	2022 Oran	400 m medley
Bronze medal – third place	2022 Oran	200 m medley
World University Games
Silver medal – second place	2021 Chengdu	400 m medley

Pier Andrea Matteazzi (born 5 December 1997 in Vicenza) is an Italian swimmer, specialized in 400 m medley race. He competed at the 2020 Summer Olympics, in 400 m individual medley

His club is In Sport Rane Rosse and he is an athlete of the Centro Sportivo Olimpico dell'Esercito.

== Career ==
His first medal at a senior competition was won in 2017 (bronze medal with 4:20.88), the following year he won the silver medal with 4:17.21 and he participated to the 2018 Mediterranean Games in Tarragona, finishing 4th at 400 medley. He won his first Italian championships in 2019, with 4:15.73 and participates to Naples 2019 Summer Universiade. He established a new personal best with 4:15.02 in 2020, improved with 4:12.79 in 2021 for finishing 5th at the 2020 European Championships. He qualified for representing Italy at the 2020 Summer Games.

Day one of swimming at the 2022 European Aquatics Championships, in August in Rome, Matteazzi won the bronze medal in the 400 metre individual medley with a time of 4:13.29.
