= 2016 FINA World Swimming Championships (25 m) – Men's 400 metre individual medley =

Men's 400 metre individual medley at the 2016 FINA World Swimming Championships (25 m)
- Venue: WFCU Centre
- Dates: 10 December (heats and final)
- Competitors: 47 from 35 nations
- Winning time: 3:59.24

Medalists
gold medal	Daiya Seto	Japan
silver medal	Max Litchfield	Great Britain
bronze medal	Dávid Verrasztó	Hungary

The Men's 400 metre individual medley competition of the 2016 FINA World Swimming Championships (25 m) was held on 10 December 2016.

== Records ==
Prior to the competition, the existing world and championship records were as follows.

	Name	Nation	Time	Location	Date
World record Championship record	Ryan Lochte	United States	3:55.50	Dubai	16 December 2010

== Results ==
=== Heats ===
The heats were held at 10:04.

Rank	Heat	Lane	Name	Nationality	Time	Notes
1	3	5	Max Litchfield	Great Britain	4:03.56	Q
2	5	4	Dávid Verrasztó	Hungary	4:04.08	Q
3	5	6	Josh Prenot	United States	4:04.43	Q
4	5	8	Abrahm DeVine	United States	4:04.64	Q
5	5	5	Gergely Gyurta	Hungary	4:04.88	Q
6	4	4	Daiya Seto	Japan	4:05.00	Q
7	4	2	Takeharu Fujimori	Japan	4:05.83	Q
8	1	7	Mark Szaranek	Great Britain	4:06.07	Q
9	4	3	Brandonn Almeida	Brazil	4:06.09	
10	5	3	Richárd Nagy	Slovakia	4:07.19	
11	4	1	Joan Lluís Pons	Spain	4:08.01	
12	5	2	Clyde Lewis	Australia	4:08.52	
13	4	7	Jérémy Desplanches	Switzerland	4:09.38	
14	1	2	Jakub Maly	Austria	4:09.46	
15	4	9	Mao Feilian	China	4:09.63	
16	3	3	Tomas Peribonio	Ecuador	4:10.27	NR
17	5	0	Pavel Janeček	Czech Republic	4:10.96	
18	3	4	João Vital	Portugal	4:11.80	
19	4	0	Diogo Carvalho	Portugal	4:11.92	
20	2	4	Neil Fair	South Africa	4:12.00	
21	3	2	Tristan Cote	Canada	4:12.73	
22	4	8	Adam Paulsson	Sweden	4:13.96	
23	5	7	Dmitrii Gorbunov	Russia	4:14.59	
24	5	9	Jonathan Gómez	Colombia	4:14.80	NR
25	3	7	Luke Reilly	Canada	4:15.58	
26	2	7	Jarod Arroyo	Puerto Rico	4:20.12	
27	2	3	Wen Ren-hau	Chinese Taipei	4:20.26	
28	2	2	Matías López	Paraguay	4:21.56	NR
29	3	8	Eben Vorster	South Africa	4:23.19	
30	3	0	Luis Vega Torres	Cuba	4:23.65	NR
31	3	9	Esteban Araya	Costa Rica	4:25.00	NR
32	2	5	Felipe Quiroz Uteau	Chile	4:25.14	NR
33	3	1	Yeziel Morales Miranda	Puerto Rico	4:25.79	
34	2	1	Lin Sizhuang	Macau	4:28.91	NR
35	1	1	Akaki Vashakidze	Georgia	4:30.97	
36	1	4	Alberto Batungbacal	Philippines	4:32.74	
37	2	0	Brandon Schuster	Samoa	4:32.78	NR
38	2	8	Colin Bensadon	Gibraltar	4:35.97	NR
39	1	5	Russell Brown	Costa Rica	4:42.45	
40	1	3	Carlos Vasquez	Honduras	5:02.23	NR
	1	6	Tommy Imazu	Guam		DSQ
	2	9	Brandon Vives	Dominican Republic		DSQ
	4	6	Daniil Pasynkov	Russia		DSQ
	2	6	Lâm Quang Nhật	Vietnam		DNS
	3	6	Pang Sheng Jun	Singapore		DNS
	4	5	Philip Heintz	Germany		DNS
	5	1	Wang Shun	China		DNS

=== Final ===
The final was held at 19:50.

Rank	Lane	Name	Nationality	Time	Notes
1st place, gold medalist(s)	7	Daiya Seto	Japan	3:59.24	
2nd place, silver medalist(s)	4	Max Litchfield	Great Britain	4:00.66	NR
3rd place, bronze medalist(s)	5	Dávid Verrasztó	Hungary	4:01.56	
4	3	Josh Prenot	United States	4:01.94	
5	8	Mark Szaranek	Great Britain	4:04.57	
6	2	Gergely Gyurta	Hungary	4:04.89	
7	1	Takeharu Fujimori	Japan	4:04.90	
8	6	Abrahm DeVine	United States	4:06.02	
