= Carson Foster =

American swimmer (born 2001)

Personal information
- National team: United States
- Born: October 26, 2001 (age 24) Cincinnati, Ohio, U.S.
- Height: 5 ft 11 in (180 cm)
- Weight: 193 lb (88 kg)
- Spouse: Meredith Wolf (2024)

Sport
- Sport: Swimming
- Event: Individual Medley
- Strokes: Backstroke, butterfly, freestyle, individual medley
- Club: Mason Manta Rays (High School); Mason, Ohio
- College team: University of Texas, Austin (2021-23)
- Coach: Ken Heis (Manta Rays); Eddie Reese (U. Texas); Bob Bowman (After 2023)
Medal record
Event	1st	2nd	3rd
Olympic Games	0	1	1
World Championships (LC)	1	5	2
World Championships (SC)	4	5	2
Pan Pacific Championships	0	3	0
World Junior Championships	4	3	0
Total	9	17	5
Men's swimming
Representing the United States
Olympic Games
Silver medal – second place	2024 Paris	4×200 m freestyle
Bronze medal – third place	2024 Paris	400 m medley
World Championships (LC)
Gold medal – first place	2022 Budapest	4×200 m freestyle
Silver medal – second place	2022 Budapest	200 m medley
Silver medal – second place	2022 Budapest	400 m medley
Silver medal – second place	2023 Fukuoka	400 m medley
Silver medal – second place	2023 Fukuoka	4×200 m freestyle
Silver medal – second place	2024 Doha	200 m medley
Bronze medal – third place	2024 Doha	4×100 m freestyle
Bronze medal – third place	2024 Doha	4×200 m freestyle
World Championships (SC)
Gold medal – first place	2021 Abu Dhabi	4×200 m freestyle
Gold medal – first place	2022 Melbourne	4×200 m freestyle
Gold medal – first place	2022 Melbourne	4×100 m medley
Gold medal – first place	2024 Budapest	4×200 m freestyle
Silver medal – second place	2021 Abu Dhabi	200 m medley
Silver medal – second place	2022 Melbourne	200 m medley
Silver medal – second place	2022 Melbourne	400 m medley
Silver medal – second place	2024 Budapest	400 m freestyle
Silver medal – second place	2024 Budapest	400 m medley
Bronze medal – third place	2021 Abu Dhabi	400 m medley
Bronze medal – third place	2022 Melbourne	4×100 m freestyle
Pan Pacific Championships
Silver medal – second place	2026 Irvine	200 m butterfly
Silver medal – second place	2026 Irvine	200 m medley
Silver medal – second place	2026 Irvine	400 m medley
World Junior Championships
Gold medal – first place	2019 Budapest	200 m medley
Gold medal – first place	2019 Budapest	4×100 m freestyle
Gold medal – first place	2019 Budapest	4×200 m freestyle
Gold medal – first place	2019 Budapest	4×100 m mixed freestyle
Silver medal – second place	2017 Indianapolis	200 m backstroke
Silver medal – second place	2017 Indianapolis	4×200 m freestyle
Silver medal – second place	2019 Budapest	200 m backstroke
Junior Pan Pac Championships
Gold medal – first place	2018 Suva	200 m backstroke
Gold medal – first place	2018 Suva	200 m medley
Gold medal – first place	2018 Suva	400 m medley
Gold medal – first place	2018 Suva	4×200 m freestyle

Carson James Foster (born October 26, 2001) is an American competitive swimmer who competed for the University of Texas Longhorns and represented the United States at the 2024 Summer Olympics in Paris, winning a bronze medal in the close finish of the 400-meter individual medley and a silver medal in the Men's 4 × 200 meter freestyle relay. Outstanding in international competition, he was a triple gold medalist at the 2019 World Junior Championships in Budapest, and a double silver medalist at the 2017 World Junior Championships in Indianapolis. Foster also represented the United States at the 2018 Junior Pan Pacific Championships in Suva, Fiji, winning four gold medals in medley, freestyle and backstroke events.

== Early life ==
Foster was born October 26, 2001, in Cincinnati, Ohio. He spent his early years in Arizona, where he learned to swim in his family's backyard pool with his two older siblings, brother Jake and sister Hannah, who both became collegiate swimmers. Foster began swimming competitively at the age of six. When he was 10, he broke the National Age Group record in the 50-meter butterfly for the 10 and under age group, with his swim of 29.91 seconds making him the youngest American to complete the race in less than 30 seconds. He attended the Cincinnati area's Sycamore Middle School and by 14, swimming for the Mason Manta Rays of Mason, Ohio, he qualified to compete in the 400 Individual Medley at the 2016 Olympic trials in Omaha, Nebraska.

=== Mason Manta Rays ===
At the Mason Manta Rays, a highly competitive swim club in the Northern Cincinnati suburb of Mason, Carson was trained and mentored by Head Coach Ken Heis, who began coaching the Rays in 2003. Heis, a Cincinnati native and former All American swimmer for Kenyon College, led the Manta Rays to Summer Junior National team championships with a first in 2018, and a third in 2019 during Foster's time with the team. The Manta Rays were Winter Junior National Team champions and ISCA Junior National Team Cup Champions in both 2017 and 2018. From a swimming family, Carson and his two siblings Jake and Hannah all qualified for the U.S. Olympic swimming trials in 2016. Ending his years as a High School swimmer around 2020, Foster graduated Cincinnati's Sycamore High School.

Demonstrating diversity in stroke skills at the World Junior Championships in 2019, Foster won a silver and four gold medals in individual medley, freestyle and backstroke events, including a win in the 200-meter Individual Medley, which would become a signature event.

== Collegiate career ==
From 2020-2023, Foster competed with the Longhorns swimming team at the University of Texas, in Austin. At Texas, where he was managed by men's head swimming coach Eddie Reese from 2021-2023, he was an All American thirteen times, receiving the honor in the 200 backstroke, the 200 and 400 Individual Medley, the 400 freestyle relay, and the 800 freestyle relay. From 2021-2023, he was a national champion in three successive years in the 800 freestyle relay. Foster set a University of Texas School record in the 400 Individual Medley of 3:33.79. He turned professional after his junior year, forgoing his final two seasons of NCAA eligibility.

== International career ==
=== 2016 U.S. Olympic trials ===
Foster competed at the 2016 US Olympic Trials in Omaha, Nebraska, in the 400-meter individual medley where he finished ranked 43rd overall in the preliminaries.

=== 2020 U.S. Olympic trials ===
In preparation for the June 2020 trials, Foster trained six days a week, with practices as long as three hours, often performing dryland training as well. At the time of the 2020 US Olympic Trials in Omaha, Nebraska, Foster ranked eighth in the 200-meter freestyle with a time of 1:46.67. He also ranked third in the 400-meter individual medley. Foster swam a 1:57.99 for the 200 individual medley 2021 trial finals, placing fourth, with only the first two finishers qualifying for the team. In the finals of the 400 meter individual medley in the 2020 trials on June 13, 2021, where he finished in 4:10.86, Foster was leading through the final 100 meters but was passed by two competitors, Chase Kalisz and Jay Litherland, who both qualified for the U.S. team. In a disappointing turn, though his time was just under two seconds behind the first and second place finishers in the close 2021 trial finish, Foster placed third, and failed to make the team.

Only a month after the 2020 trials, held in 2021, Foster swam a 4:08:46 for the 400 individual medley at the Southern Sectionals meet in Austin, Texas. The time, which was two seconds under his time in the trials, would have qualified him in the event at the 2020 U.S. Omaha Olympic trials, and would have earned him a gold medal at the 2020 Tokyo Olympics.

At the World Championships in 2022, in individual medley events, he captured two silver medals. Carson won three national titles in 2023. In that year, at the World Championships in Fukuoka, Japan, he captured a silver at the World Championships for a second time.

== 2024 Olympic medals ==
At the 2024 Olympic trials in Indianapolis, Foster made the U.S. Olympic team for the first time in the 400-meter individual medley, swimming the fastest time in the world for 2024 with a 4:07.64. He credited performance coaches Susannah Muller and Jim Murphy with his improvement. Foster also qualified in the 200-meter individual medley, winning the finals at the 2024 Indianapolis trials.

At the 2024 Summer Olympics in Paris, Foster won a bronze medal in the 400-meter individual medley on July 28, with a time of 4:08.66, finishing only .04 seconds behind the Japanese silver medalist. He won a silver medal in the 4 × 200-meter freestyle relay, with the team of Luke Hobson, Drew Kibler, and Kieran Smith, where the team swam a combined time of 7:00.78. In the 200 individual medley finals, Foster finished fourth with a time of 1:56.10, placing just out of medal contention in a strong field.

In 2024, Carson continued to train in the Austin area, and was managed in workouts by coach Bob Bowman, who took over as head coach of the University of Texas team in 2024.

== Personal life ==
Shortly after the Olympics, on August 16, 2024, Carson married Meredith Wolf, a former Manta Rays swim team mate, with whom he attended Sycamore High School. Wolf was a 2022 graduate of the University of South Carolina, with a degree in International Business. Ending a two year engagement, their marriage took place at the large venue provided by Cincinnati's Monastery Event Center.
