= Swimming at the 2024 European Aquatics Championships – Men's 400 metre individual medley =

Men's 400 metre individual medley at the 2024 European Aquatics Championships
- Venue: Sports Centre Milan Gale Muškatirović
- Dates: 17 June
- Competitors: 20 from 12 nations
- Winning time: 4:10.83

Medalists
gold medal	Apostolos Papastamos	Greece
silver medal	Balázs Holló	Hungary
bronze medal	Gabor Zombori	Hungary

The Men's 400 metre individual medley competition of the 2024 European Aquatics Championships was held on 17 June 2024.

== Records ==
Prior to the competition, the existing world, European and championship records were as follows.

	Name	Nation	Time	Location	Date
World record	Léon Marchand	France	4:02.50	Fukuoka	23 July 2023
European record	Léon Marchand	France	4:02.50	Fukuoka	23 July 2023
Championship record	László Cseh	Hungary	4:09.59	Eindhoven	24 March 2008

== Results ==
=== Heats ===
The heats were started at 09:30.

Rank	Heat	Lane	Name	Nationality	Time	Notes
1	1	4	Balázs Holló	Hungary	4:12.46	Q
2	2	4	Gábor Zombori	Hungary	4:13.75	Q
3	1	5	Dominik Török	Hungary	4:14.76	
4	2	3	Zalán Sarkany	Hungary	4:15.16	
5	2	5	Apostolos Papastamos	Greece	4:15.97	Q
6	2	2	Marius Toscan	Switzerland	4:18.91	Q
7	2	6	Daniil Giourtzidis	Greece	4:19.11	Q
8	1	7	Juraj Barcot	Croatia	4:20.96	Q
9	1	3	Richard Nagy	Slovakia	4:21.39	Q
10	2	8	Heorhii Lukashev	Ukraine	4:21.82	Q
11	1	6	Vasileios Sofikitis	Greece	4:21.89	
12	1	8	Krzysztof Chmielewski	Poland	4:21.91	
13	2	7	Oleksii Hrabarov	Ukraine	4:23.03	
14	1	0	Anže Ferš Eržen	Slovenia	4:23.63	
15	1	2	Michal Judickij	Czech Republic	4:25.06	
16	2	1	Jakub Bursa	Czech Republic	4:25.74	
17	1	9	Moritz Baumgartner	Austria	4:26.36	
18	2	0	Finn Wendland	Germany	4:27.69	
19	2	9	Noah Zemansky	Austria	4:28.96	
	1	1	Eitan Ben Shitrit	Israel	Did not start	

=== Final ===
The final was held at 18:46.

Rank	Lane	Name	Nationality	Time	Notes
1st place, gold medalist(s)	3	Apostolos Papastamos	Greece	4:10.83	NR
2nd place, silver medalist(s)	4	Balázs Holló	Hungary	4:11.51	
3rd place, bronze medalist(s)	5	Gábor Zombori	Hungary	4:11.70	
4	2	Daniil Giourtzidis	Greece	4:16.64	
5	6	Marius Toscan	Switzerland	4:17.51	
6	8	Heorhii Lukashev	Ukraine	4:21.20	
7	7	Juraj Barcot	Croatia	4:21.52	
8	1	Richard Nagy	Slovakia	4:22.14	
