= Ilya Borodin (swimmer) =

Russian swimmer

Personal information
- Full name: Ilya Aleksandrovich Borodin
- Nationality: (Russia) Russian
- Born: 14 February 2003 (age 23) Bryansk, Russia

Sport
- Sport: Swimming
- Strokes: Individual medley
- Club: Dolphin Youth Sports School
- Coach: Marina Svistak
Medal record
Men's swimming
Representing Neutral Athletes B
World Championships (LC)
Bronze medal – third place	2025 Singapore	400 m medley
World Championships (SC)
Gold medal – first place	2024 Budapest	400 m medley
European Championships (LC)
Gold medal – first place	2026 Paris	400 m medley
Representing Russian Swimming Federation
World Championships (SC)
Silver medal – second place	2021 Abu Dhabi	400 m medley
Representing Russia
European Championships (LC)
Gold medal – first place	2020 Budapest	400 m medley
European Championships (SC)
Gold medal – first place	2021 Kazan	400 m medley
Silver medal – second place	2019 Glasgow	400 m medley
World Junior Championships
Silver medal – second place	2019 Budapest	400 m medley
European Junior Championships
Silver medal – second place	2019 Kazan	400 m medley
European Youth Olympic Festival
Gold medal – first place	2019 Baku	200 m medley
Gold medal – first place	2019 Baku	400 m medley
Gold medal – first place	2019 Baku	4x100 m mixed medley
Silver medal – second place	2019 Baku	4x100 m freestyle

Ilya Aleksandrovich Borodin (Russian: Илья Александрович Бородин; born 14 February 2003) is a Russian swimmer. He is the 2020 European Champions in the men's 400 m individual medley. He also won gold medals in the 200 m and 400 m individual medley events at the 2019 European Youth Summer Olympic Festival.

Borodin took up swimming aged seven. He missed the 2021 Summer Olympics because of a positive COVID-19 test. In the 400 metre individual medley event of the 2021 World Championships in Abu Dhabi he won the silver medal behind Daiya Seto establishing a world junior record and European record with a time of 3:56.47.
