= Yumeki Kojima =

Japanese swimmer (born 2008)

Personal information
- Nationality: Japanese
- Born: 20 December 2008 (age 17)

Sport
- Sport: Swimming
- Strokes: Backstroke, Individual medley
Medal record
Men's swimming
Representing Japan
Asian Games
Gold medal – first place	2026 Aichi–Nagoya	400 m medley
Silver medal – second place	2026 Aichi–Nagoya	200 m medley
Pan Pacific Championships
Gold medal – first place	2026 Irvine	200 m backstroke
World Junior Championships
Gold medal – first place	2025 Otopeni	4x100 m medley
Gold medal – first place	2025 Otopeni	4x100 m mixed medley
Silver medal – second place	2025 Otopeni	200 m ind. medley
Silver medal – second place	2025 Otopeni	400 m ind. medley
Silver medal – second place	2025 Otopeni	4x200 m freestyle

Yumeki Kojima (小島夢貴, Kojima Yumeki; born 20 December 2008) is a Japanese swimmer.

== Career ==
On 21 March 2026, Kojima set a world junior record in the 200 metre individual medley with a time of 1:56.53. In August 2026, he competed at the 2026 Pan Pacific Swimming Championships and won a gold medal in the 200 metre backstroke with a time of 1:55.38. He also lowered his own world junior record during the heats of the 400 metre individual medley with a time of 4:08.69.

In September 2026, he competed at the 2026 Asian Games. On the first day of the Asian Games he won a silver medal in the 200 metre individual medley with a world junior record time of 1:55.36. On the third day of the competition he won a gold medal in the 400 metre individual medley with an Asian Games record and world junior record time of 4:07.02.
