= Kim Min-seok =

Kim Min-seok may refer to:

- Kim Min-seok (politician) (born 1964), prime minister of South Korea
- Kim Min-suk (swimmer) (born 1979), South Korean swimmer
- Kim Min-seok (actor) (born 1990), South Korean actor
- Kim Min-seok, the birth name of Xiumin (born 1990), a member of the Chinese-South Korean boy band Exo
- Kim Min-seok (singer, born 1991), (born 1991), a member of the South Korean duo MeloMance
- Kim Min-seok (table tennis) (born 1992), South Korean table tennis player
- Kim Min-seok (figure skater) (born 1993), South Korean figure skater
- Kim Min-seok (wrestler) (born 1993), South Korean wrestler
- Kim Min-seok (speed skater) (born 1999), Hungarian speed skater, born in South Korea
- Kim Min-seok, the birth name of Laun (born 1999), a former member of the South Korean boy band ONF
