= Alberto Razzetti =

Italian swimmer (born 1999)

Personal information
- Nationality: Italian
- Born: 2 June 1999 (age 27) Lavagna, Italy
- Height: 1.88 m (6 ft 2 in)

Sport
- Sport: Swimming
- Strokes: Butterfly
Medal record
Men's swimming
Representing Italy
World Championships (LC)
Silver medal – second place	2024 Doha	200 m butterfly
Bronze medal – third place	2024 Doha	200 m medley
World Championships (SC)
Gold medal – first place	2021 Abu Dhabi	200 m butterfly
Gold medal – first place	2021 Abu Dhabi	4×100 m medley
Silver medal – second place	2024 Budapest	200 m butterfly
Silver medal – second place	2024 Budapest	200 m medley
Bronze medal – third place	2021 Abu Dhabi	200 m medley
Bronze medal – third place	2022 Melbourne	4×200 m freestyle
Bronze medal – third place	2022 Melbourne	4×100 m medley
Bronze medal – third place	2024 Budapest	400 m medley
Bronze medal – third place	2024 Budapest	4×200 m freestyle
European Championships (LC)
Gold medal – first place	2022 Rome	400 m medley
Silver medal – second place	2020 Budapest	400 m medley
Silver medal – second place	2022 Rome	200 m medley
Silver medal – second place	2026 Paris	400 m medley
Silver medal – second place	2026 Paris	4×100 m medley
Bronze medal – third place	2020 Budapest	200 m medley
Bronze medal – third place	2022 Rome	200 m butterfly
European Championships (SC)
Gold medal – first place	2021 Kazan	200 m butterfly
Gold medal – first place	2025 Lublin	400 m medley
Silver medal – second place	2021 Kazan	400 m medley
Silver medal – second place	2025 Lublin	200 m medley
Bronze medal – third place	2021 Kazan	200 m medley
Mediterranean Games
Gold medal – first place	2026 Taranto	100 m butterfly
Gold medal – first place	2026 Taranto	200 m butterfly
Gold medal – first place	2026 Taranto	400 m medley
European Youth Olympic Festival
Gold medal – first place	2015 Tbilisi	4x100 m medley

Alberto Razzetti (born 2 June 1999) is an Italian swimmer. He won the gold medal in the men's 200 metre butterfly event at both the 2021 FINA World Swimming Championships (25 m) held in Abu Dhabi, United Arab Emirates and the 2021 European Short Course Swimming Championships held in Kazan, Russia. He competed in the men's 200 metre individual medley and men's 400 metre individual medley events at the 2020 Summer Olympics in Tokyo.

== Career ==
In 2019, he competed at the Summer Universiade in Naples, Italy. In 2021, he won the silver medal in the men's 400 metre individual medley and the bronze medal in the men's 200 metre individual medley at the 2020 European Aquatics Championships held in Budapest, Hungary.

On the first day of the 2022 European Aquatics Championships, held in Rome in August, Razzetti won the first gold medal for Italy at the Championships, placing first in the 400 metre individual medley with a time of 4:10.60. Five days later, he won the bronze medal in the 200 metre butterfly with a time of 1:55.01, finishing 3.00 seconds behind gold medalist Kristóf Milák of Hungary. On the seventh and final day of swimming, he won the silver medal in the 200 metre individual medley, finishing in a time of 1:57.82.
