= Maxim Stupin =

Russian swimmer

Personal information
- Full name: Maxim Alekseyevich Stupin
- Nationality: Russia
- Born: 11 May 2000 (age 24); Moscow, Russia

Sport
- Sport: Swimming

Maxim Alekseyevich Stupin (Russian: Максим Алексеевич Ступин; born 11 May 2000) is a Russian swimmer. He competed in the 2020 Summer Olympics.
