= Gábor Zombori =

Hungarian swimmer

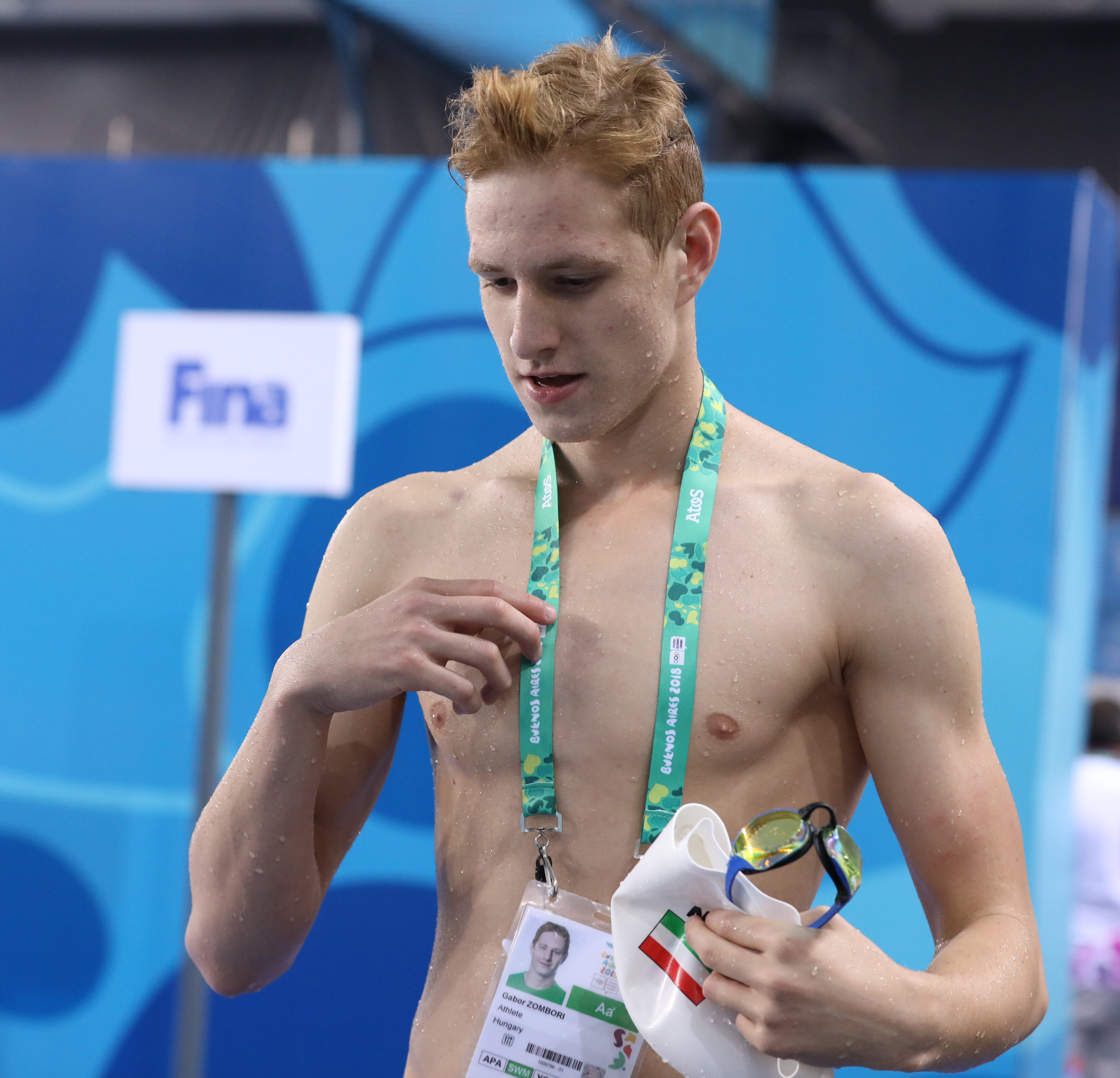
- Zombori in 2018

Personal information
- Nationality: Hungarian
- Born: 8 October 2002 (age 23) Szolnok, Hungary

Sport
- Sport: Swimming
- Strokes: Freestyle
Medal record
Men's swimming
Representing Hungary
European Championships (LC)
Bronze medal – third place	2024 Belgrade	400 m medley
World Junior Championships
Gold medal – first place	2019 Budapest	400 m freestyle
European Youth Olympic Festival
Gold medal – first place	2017 Győr	200 m backstroke
Silver medal – second place	2017 Győr	100 m backstroke
Bronze medal – third place	2017 Győr	4×100 m mixed medley
European Junior Championships
Bronze medal – third place	2018 Helsinki	4×100 m mixed freestyle
Bronze medal – third place	2019 Kazan	4×200 m freestyle

Gábor Zombori (born 8 October 2002) is a Hungarian swimmer. He competed in the men's 200 metre freestyle event at the 2020 European Aquatics Championships, in Budapest, Hungary.
