= Cedric Büssing =

German swimmer

Personal information
- Nationality: German
- Born: 17 October 2003 (age 22) Grevenbroich, Germany
- Height: 1.83 m (6 ft 0 in)

Sport
- Sport: Swimming
- Strokes: Freestyle, medley
- College team: Indianapolis Greyhounds

Cedric Büssing (born 17 October 2003) is a German competitive swimmer who represented Germany at the 2024 Summer Olympics. A member of the Indianapolis Greyhounds, he became the first NCAA Division II swimmer to make an Olympic final, finishing 8th in the 400m individual medley. During his preliminary heat, Büssing set the German national record with a time of 4:11.52, surpassing Jacob Heidtmann's time set in 2015.

Büssing is originally from Grevenbroich. He attended Goethe-Gymnasium in Dortmund. He is a 17-time NCAA All-American and holds numerous school records as part of the Greyhounds. He won three medals at the 2021 European Junior Swimming Championships.
