= Apostolos Papastamos =

Greek swimmer

Personal information
- National team: Greece
- Born: 20 March 2001 (age 25) Chania, Greece

Sport
- Sport: Swimming
- Strokes: Individual medley
Medal record
Representing Greece
European Championships (LC)
Gold medal – first place	2024 Belgrade	400 m medley
World Junior Championships
Gold medal – first place	2019 Budapest	400 m medley
Bronze medal – third place	2019 Budapest	200 m medley
European Junior Championships
Gold medal – first place	2019 Kazan	200 m medley
Gold medal – first place	2019 Kazan	400 m medley
Silver medal – second place	2018 Helsinki	400 m medley
European Youth Olympic Festival
Gold medal – first place	2017 Győr	400 m medley

Apostolos Papastamos (Greek: Απόστολος Παπασταμος, romanized: Apóstolos Papastamos; born 20 March 2001) is a Greek swimmer. He qualified to represent Greece at the 2020 Summer Olympics in both the men's 200 metre individual medley and the men's 400 metre individual medley.
