= Max Litchfield =

British swimmer (born 1995)

Personal information
- Full name: Max Robert Litchfield
- Nationality: British (English)
- Born: 4 March 1995 (age 31) Pontefract, England
- Height: 1.86 m (6 ft 1 in)
- Weight: 77 kg (170 lb)

Sport
- Sport: Swimming
- Strokes: Freestyle, medley
- Club: Energy Standard; Loughborough National Centre (NC)
- College team: Sheffield Hallam University
- Coach: Dave Hemmings
Medal record
World Championships (LC)
| Silver medal – second place | 2024 Doha | 400 m medley |
World Championships (SC)
| Silver medal – second place | 2016 Windsor | 400 m medley |
European Championships (LC)
| Silver medal – second place | 2018 Glasgow | 400 m medley |
| Silver medal – second place | 2020 Budapest | 4×200 m freestyle |
| Bronze medal – third place | 2018 Glasgow | 200 m medley |
| Bronze medal – third place | 2020 Budapest | 400 m medley |
| Bronze medal – third place | 2026 Paris | 400 m medley |
European Championships (SC)
| Gold medal – first place | 2019 Glasgow | 400 m medley |
| Silver medal – second place | 2025 Lublin | 400 m individual medley |
European Junior Championships
| Gold medal – first place | 2013 Poznan | 4x200 m freestyle |
| Silver medal – second place | 2013 Poznan | 200 m medley |

Max Robert Litchfield (born 4 March 1995) is a British competitive swimmer who represented Great Britain at three Olympics, and the LEN European Aquatics Championships. He also swam for England in the 2014 Commonwealth Games. He competes internationally in freestyle and medley swimming events and swims for Energy Standard in the International Swimming League.

== Biography ==
Litchfield was born in Pontefract, the son of former professional footballer, Peter Litchfield and his younger brother Joe Litchfield also being a swimmer. Litchfield studied physiotherapy at Sheffield Hallam University. Litchfield began his swimming journey under the wing of coach Andrew Wallace, at Doncaster Dartes Swimming Club, before moving to train at City Of Sheffield's top junior squad, in 2013. This move saw him qualify for the Glasgow Commonwealth Games, shortly after, in the 400m Individual Medley. Max now trains at the British Swimming Loughborough National Centre (NC).

Litchfield swam at the 2014 Commonwealth Games in Glasgow where he finished 12th in both the 400m individual medley and the 1500m freestyle. He also turned out at the European Championships in Berlin in the same year where he finished fourth in the final of the 400m IM. He is a former World Junior Champion, having helped the 4 × 200 m freestyle team swim to gold in Dubai in 2013.

At the Olympic trials in 2016, he clinched victory in the 400m IM in a time of 4:12.05 to dip under the qualification time for Rio 2016. He later competed at the 2016 Summer Olympics in Rio de Janeiro achieving a 5th place in his heat. In the finals session he improved his personal best further to place 4th in his first Olympic final.

In 2018, he suffered an injury to the shoulder and withdrew from the Commonwealth Games. At the 2018 European Championships, Litchfield won a bronze in the 200 metre individual medley, his first major medal since the injury. He then won a silver in the 400 metre individual medley.

In the Autumn of 2019 he was member of the inaugural International Swimming League swimming for the Energy Standard International Swim Club, who won the team title in Las Vegas, Nevada, in December.

For the 400 metre freestyle at the 2022 South Africa National Swimming Championships, Litchfield placed second, only behind Matthew Sates of South Africa, to win the silver medal with a time of 3:51.37. On the second day, he won the silver medal in the 200 metre freestyle in a time of 1:49.49 and a gold medal in the 400 metre individual medley with a 2022 World Aquatics Championships qualifying time of 4:15.39. The following day, he won the silver medal in the 200 metre butterfly, finishing less than two seconds behind Chad le Clos of South Africa with a 1:57.66. The sixth and final day of competition, he won the silver medal in the 200 metre individual medley with a time of 1:59.96. His competing at the Championships was a culmination of a six-week stay in South Africa training with Chad le Clos in Cape Town. While he was pre-qualified for the World Championships, he was not named to the Great Britain roster for the year. He was initially named to the Team England roster for the 2022 Commonwealth Games, however was later replaced by Tony Robinson after withdrawing from the Games.

Licthfield won the 400 metres medley at the 2024 Aquatics GB Swimming Championships sealing his place at the 2024 Summer Olympics. The win over the 400 metres distance was a new national record in a time of 4.09.14. At the 2024 Olympic Games in Paris, he participated in the men's 400 metre medley competition, where he reached the Olympic final and just missed out on a medal after finishing fourth despite setting a national record.

In 2025, Litchfield successfully defended his 400 metres medley title at the 2025 Aquatics GB Swimming Championships, which sealed a qualification place for the 2025 World Aquatics Championships in Singapore.

== Awards ==
The 2016 British Universities & Colleges Sport (BUCS) Sportsman of the Year
