= Dimitry Ermakov =

Russian competitive swimmer (born 1993)

Dmitry Ermakov
Personal information
- Full name: Dmitry Ermakov
- Nationality: Russia
- Born: February 7, 1993 (age 33) Moscow, Russia
- Years active: 2010–present

Sport
- Sport: Freestyle swimming, Butterfly stroke
- Club: FSO "Yunost Moskvy"
- Coach: Y. V. Abramkov, A. A. Shabanov
Medal record
Men's swimming
World Swimming Championships (SC)
Bronze medal – third place	2014 Doha	4×200 m freestyle relay
European Swimming Championships
Silver medal – second place	2014 Berlin	4×200 m freestyle relay
World Cup Stages
Gold medal – first place	Moscow 2012	4×50 m mixed freestyle relay
Gold medal – first place	Moscow 2013	4×50 m mixed freestyle relay
Universiade
Bronze medal – third place	Gwangju 2015	4×100 m freestyle relay

Dmitry Alekseevich Ermakov (Russian: Дмитрий Алексеевич Ермаков; born February 7, 1993) is a retired Russian competitive swimmer. He is a former world record holder and holds the title of Master of Sport of Russia, International Class.

== Career ==
Ermakov trained at the "Yunost Moskvy" Olympic reserve school.

In 2011, Dmitry was a junior world championship medalist twice. The following year, he secured gold in the same event at the Russian Championships.

In 2013, Ermakov was granted the sports title of Master of Sport of Russia, International Class. Later that year, at the FINA World Cup in Moscow, he was part of the Russian mixed 4×50m freestyle relay team that set a world record with a time of 1:33.01. His teammates included Rozaliya Nasretdinova, Artem Lobuzov, and Maria Reznikova.

At the 2014 World Swimming Championships (25m), Ermakov earned a bronze medal for his participation in the preliminary round of the 4×200 meters freestyle relay.

The same year, he won silver at the 2014 European Aquatics Championships in Berlin, competing in the 4×200 meters freestyle relay.

In 2015, he competed at the Summer Universiade in Gwangju, where he helped the Russian team secure a bronze medal in the 4×100 meter freestyle relay.

== Records ==
Records
Preceded by (United States); Bailey Presley (27.64); Stephanie Armstrong (26.36); Tanner Kurz (23.71); Cody Miller (23.55); September 26, 2013 - 1:41.16	World Record – Mixed 4×50 m Freestyle Relay (Russia); Rozaliya Nasretdinova (24.56); Dmitry Ermakov (21.97); Artem Lobuzov (22.06); Maria Reznikova (24.42) October 13, 2013 - 1:33.01	Succeeded by (Japan); Shinri Shioura (21.63); Sayaka Akase (25.28); Kenta Ito (20.70); Kanako Watanabe (24.91); October 18, 2013 - 1:32.52
