= 4 × 50 metres freestyle relay =

The 4 × 50 metres freestyle relay is an event in competitive swimming. It is only recognised by World Aquatics (formerly FINA) in short course.

World records are ratified by World Aquatics. The current world record holders are the US (men), the Netherlands (women) and Italy (mixed). The men's, women's and mixed events were first contested at the World Aquatics Swimming Championships (25m) in 2014; the men's and women's events were removed from the 2024 program. The current world champion (mixed) is Italy.

== World record progression ==
=== Men ===
#	Time		Name	Nationality	Date	Meet	Location	Ref
1	1:36.81		Cody Miller; James Wells; Matt Gerth; Philip Butler	(United States) Indiana University Hoosiers	26 September 2013	IU Fall Frenzy	Bloomington, United States	
2	1:25.52	h	François Heersbrandt (21.82); Yoris Grandjean (21.16); Pieter Timmers (21.49); Jasper Aerents (21.05)	Belgium	15 December 2013	European Championships	Herning, Denmark	
3	1:23.36		Vladimir Morozov (20.87); Sergei Fesikov (20.57); Evgeny Lagunov (21.03); Nikita Konovalov (20.89)	Russia	15 December 2013	European Championships	Herning, Denmark	
4	1:22.60		Vladimir Morozov (21.01); Evgeny Sedov (20.37); Oleg Tikhobaev (20.59); Sergei Fesikov (20.63)	Russia	6 December 2014	World Championships	Doha, Qatar	
5	1:21.80		Caeleb Dressel (20.43); Ryan Held (20.25); Jack Conger (20.59); Michael Chadwick (20.53)	United States	14 December 2018	World Championships	Hangzhou, China	

Legend: # – Record awaiting ratification by FINA; e – equalled existing record;
Records not set in finals: h – heat; so – swim-off

=== Women ===
#	Time		Name	Nationality	Date	Meet	Location	Ref
1	1:54.97		Stephanie Marchuk; Claudia Dicapua; Audrey Scott; Grace Padget	(United States) Indiana University Hoosiers	26 September 2013	IU Fall Frenzy	Bloomington, United States	
2	1:37.21	h	Michelle Coleman (24.72); Sarah Sjöström (23.60); Louise Hansson (24.50); Magdalena Kuras (24.39)	Sweden	12 December 2013	European Championships	Herning, Denmark	
3	1:37.04		Pernille Blume (24.90); Jeanette Ottesen (23.66); Kelly Riber Rasmussen (24.63); Mie Nielsen (23.85)	Denmark	12 December 2013	European Championships	Herning, Denmark	
4	1:35.74	h	Esmee Vermeulen (25.09); Ranomi Kromowidjojo (23.01); Maud van der Meer (23.89); Inge Dekker (23.75)	Netherlands	7 December 2014	World Championships	Doha, Qatar	
5	1:34.24		Inge Dekker (24.09); Femke Heemskerk (23.24); Maud van der Meer (24.03); Ranomi Kromowidjojo (22.88)	Netherlands	7 December 2014	World Championships	Doha, Qatar	
6	1:33.91		Ranomi Kromowidjojo (23.42); Femke Heemskerk (23.19); Tamara van Vliet (23.65); Valerie van Roon (23.65)	Netherlands	15 December 2017	European Championships	Copenhagen, Denmark	
7	1:32.50	tt	Ranomi Kromowidjojo (23.05); Maaike de Waard (23.16); Kim Busch (23.47); Femke Heemskerk (22.82)	Netherlands	12 December 2020	Wouda Cup	Eindhoven, Netherlands	

Legend: # – Record awaiting ratification by FINA; e – equalled existing record;
Records not set in finals: h – heat; so – swim-off

=== Mixed ===
#	Time		Name	Nationality	Date	Meet	Location	Ref
1	1:41.16		Bailey Pressey (27.64); Stephanie Armstrong (26.36); Tanner Kurz (23.71); Cody Miller (23.55)	(United States) Indiana University Hoosiers	26 September 2013	IU Fall Frenzy	Bloomington, United States	
-	1:36.78	unratified	Michael Wynalda (23.12); Zoe Mattingly (25.23); Sli DeLoof (25.75); Kyle Whitaker (22.68)	(United States) Michigan University	28 September 2013	Water Carnival	Ann Arbor, United States	
2	1:33.01		Rozaliya Nasretdinova (24.56); Dmitry Ermakov (21.97); Artem Lobuzov (22.06); Maria Reznikova (24.42)	Russia	13 October 2013	World Cup	Moscow, Russia	
3	1:32.52		Shinri Shioura (21.63); Sayaka Akase (25.28); Kenta Ito (20.70); Kanako Watanabe (24.91)	Japan	18 October 2013	World Cup	Dubai, United Arab Emirates	
4	1:31.14		Florent Manaudou (21.22); Jérémy Stravius (20.87); Mélanie Henique (24.61); Anna Santamans (24.44)	France	21 October 2013	World Cup	Doha, Qatar	
5	1:31.13	h	Tomaso D'Orsogna (21.62); Regan Leong (21.98); Bronte Campbell (24.03); Cate Campbell (23.50)	Australia	10 November 2013	World Cup	Tokyo, Japan	
6	1:29.61		Tomaso D'Orsogna (21.48); Travis Mahoney (21.59); Cate Campbell (23.10); Bronte Campbell (23.44)	Australia	10 November 2013	World Cup	Tokyo, Japan	
7	1:29.53		Sergey Fesikov (21.13); Vladimir Morozov (20.72); Rozaliya Nasretdinova (23.70); Veronika Popova (23.98)	Russia	14 December 2013	European Championships	Herning, Denmark	
8	1:28.57		Josh Schneider (20.94); Matt Grevers (20.75); Madison Kennedy (23.63); Abbey Weitzeil (23.25)	United States	6 December 2014	World Championships	Doha, Qatar	
9	1:28.39		Nyls Korstanje (21.42); Kyle Stolk (20.66); Ranomi Kromowidjojo (23.01); Femke Heemskerk (23.30)	Netherlands	16 December 2017	European Championships	Copenhagen, Denmark	
10	1:27.89		Caeleb Dressel (20.43); Ryan Held (20.60); Mallory Comerford (23.44); Kelsi Dahlia (23.42)	United States	12 December 2018	World Championships	Hangzhou, China	
11	1:27.33		Maxime Grousset (20.92); Florent Manaudou (20.26); Béryl Gastaldello (23.00); Mélanie Henique (23.15)	France	16 December 2022	World Championships	Melbourne, Australia	
12	1:27.26		Leonardo Deplano (20.97); Lorenzo Zazzeri (20.51); Silvia Di Pietro (23.07); Sara Curtis (22.71)	Italy	4 December 2025	European Championships	Lublin, Poland	

Legend: # – Record awaiting ratification by FINA; e – equalled existing record;
Records not set in finals: h – heat; so – swim-off

== All-time rankings ==
Tables show data for the top 25 4 × 50 m freestyle relay times and the top 10 national records:
- denotes top 10 national record by teams in the top 25 4 × 50 m freestyle relay times
- denotes lesser performances, still in the top 25 4 × 50 m freestyle relay times, by repeat nations
- denotes top 10 national record for other teams who fall outside the top 25 4 × 50 m freestyle relay times

=== Men ===
- Correct as of September 2026

Nat.#	Perf.#	Time	Athletes	Team	Date	Place	Ref.
1	1	1:20.77	Alain Bernard (20.64); Fabien Gilot (20.33); Amaury Leveaux (19.93); Frederick Bousquet (19.87)	France	14 December 2008	Rijeka	
2	2	1:21.80	Caeleb Dressel (20.43); Ryan Held (20.25); Jack Conger (20.59); Michael Chadwick (20.53)	United States	14 December 2018	Hangzhou	
3	3	1:22.22	Vladimir Morozov (20.39); Evgeny Sedov (20.82); Ivan Kuzmenko (20.64); Evgeny Rylov (20.37)	Russia	14 December 2018	Hangzhou	
	4	1:22.38	Alain Bernard (20.77); Fabien Gilot (20.54); Antoine Galavtine (20.95); Frederick Bousquet (20.12)	France #2	14 December 2008	Rijeka	
4	5	1:22.52	Benjamin Proud (20.56); Matthew Richards (20.50); Alexander Cohoon (20.99); Lewis Burras (20.47)	Great Britain	5 December 2023	Otopeni	
	6	1:22.60	Vladimir Morozov (21.01); Evgeny Sedov (20.37); Oleg Tikhobaev (20.59); Sergey Fesikov (20.63)	Russia #2	6 December 2014	Doha	
5	7	1:22.89	Jesse Puts (21.10); Stan Pijnenburg (20.74); Kenzo Simons (20.59); Thom de Boer (20.46)	Netherlands	2 November 2021	Kazan	
6	8	1:22.90	Santo Condorelli (21.27); Andrea Vergani (20.44); Lorenzo Zazzeri (20.57); Alessandro Miressi (20.62)	Italy	14 December 2018	Hangzhou	
6	8	1:22.90	Leonardo Deplano (20.88); Lorenzo Zazzeri (20.56); Giovanni Guatti (20.67); Thomas Ceccon (20.79)	Italy	2 December 2025	Lublin	
	10	1:22.92	Vladislav Grinev (21.23); Mikhail Vekovishchev (20.60); Kliment Kolesnikov (20.84); Vladimir Morozov (20.25)	Russia #3	4 December 2019	Glasgow	
	10	1:22.92	Alessandro Miressi (21.20); Thomas Ceccon (20.82); Lorenzo Zazzeri (20.24); Marco Orsi (20.66)	Italy #3	2 November 2021	Kazan	
	12	1:22.96	Amaury Leveaux (20.53); Jérémy Stravius (21.01); David Maitre (21.10); Frédérick Bousquet (20.32)	France #3	13 December 2009	Istanbul	
	13	1:23.14	Leonardo Deplano (21.05); Lorenzo Zazzeri (20.50); Thomas Ceccon (20.98); Alessandro Miressi (20.61)	Italy #4	5 December 2023	Otopeni	
7	14	1:23.18	Duje Draganja (20.71); Alexei Puninski (20.55); Mario Todorović (20.87); Mario Delač (21.05)	Croatia	13 December 2009	Istanbul	
	15	1:23.23	Kliment Kolesnikov (21.24); Vladimir Morozov (20.59); Sergey Fesikov (20.49); Mikhail Vekovishchev (20.91)	Russia #4	13 December 2017	Copenhagen	
8	16	1:23.27	Kristian Gkolomeev (21.15); Stergios-Marios Bilas (21.02); Apostolos Christou (20.58); Andreas Vazaios (20.52)	Greece	5 December 2023	Otopeni	
	17	1:23.31	Florent Manaudou (20.83); Frédérick Bousquet (20.65); Jérémy Stravius (21.00); Amaury Leveaux (20.83)	France #4	25 November 2012	Chartres	
	18	1:23.35	Vladimir Morozov (21.22); Vladislav Grinev (20.69); Evgeny Rylov (20.99); Kliment Kolesnikov (20.45)	Russia #5	2 November 2021	Kazan	
	19	1:23.36	Vladimir Morozov (20.87); Sergey Fesikov (20.57); Yevgeny Lagunov (21.03); Nikita Konovalov (20.89)	Russia #6	15 December 2013	Herning	
	20	1:23.37	Alessandro Calvi (21.62); Marco Orsi (20.72); Mattia Nalesso (20.59); Filippo Magnini (20.44)	Italy #5	14 December 2008	Rijeka	
9	21	1:23.44	Isaac Cooper (21.25); Matthew Temple (20.75); Flynn Southam (21.10); Kyle Chalmers (20.34)	Australia	15 December 2022	Melbourne	
	22	1:23.47	Josh Schneider (21.05); Tom Shields (20.99); Jimmy Feigen (20.79); Ryan Lochte (20.64)	US #2	6 December 2014	Doha	
	23	1:23.48	Alessandro Miressi (21.22); Leonardo Deplano (20.59); Thomas Ceccon (20.67); Manuel Frigo (21.00)	Italy #6	15 December 2022	Melbourne	
	24	1:23.49	Evgeny Sedov (20.71); Andrey Arbuzov (20.94); Aleksandr Kliukin (20.93); Nikita Konovalov (20.91)	Russia #7	2 December 2015	Netanya	
	25	1:23.51	Jere Hribar (21.00); Nikola Miljenić (20.93); Božo Puhalović (20.82); Luka Cvetko (20.76)	Croatia #2	2 December 2025	Lublin	
10		1:23.63	Piotr Ludwiczak (21.30); Ksawery Masiuk (20.62); Kamil Sieradzki (20.71); Mateusz Chowaniec (21.00)	Poland	2 December 2025	Lublin	

=== Women ===
- Correct as of September 2026

Nat.#	Perf.#	Time	Athletes	Team	Date	Place	Ref.
1	1	1:32.50	Ranomi Kromowidjojo (23.05); Maaike de Waard (23.16); Kim Busch (23.47); Femke Heemskerk (22.82)	Netherlands	12 December 2020	Eindhoven	
	2	1:33.25	Inge Dekker (23.53); Hinkelien Schreuder (22.81); Saskia de Jonge (23.88); Ranomi Kromowidjojo (23.03)	Netherlands #2	11 December 2009	Istanbul	
	3	1:33.80	Hinkelien Schreuder (23.80); Inge Dekker (23.89); Ranomi Kromowidjojo (23.29); Marleen Veldhuis (22.82)	Netherlands #3	12 December 2008	Rijeka	
	4	1:33.85	Milou van Wijk (24.08); Marrit Steenbergen (22.89); Tessa Giele (23.83); Valerie van Roon (23.05)	Netherlands #4	2 December 2025	Lublin	
2	5	1:33.89	Torri Huske (24.08); Claire Curzan (23.30); Erika Brown (23.74); Kate Douglass (22.77)	United States	15 December 2022	Melbourne	
	6	1:33.91	Ranomi Kromowidjojo (23.42); Femke Heemskerk (23.19); Tamara van Vliet (23.65); Valerie van Roon (23.65)	Netherlands #5	15 December 2017	Copenhagen	
	7	1:34.03	Madison Kennedy (24.05); Mallory Comerford (23.28); Kelsi Dahlia (23.37); Erika Brown (23.33)	US #2	16 December 2018	Hangzhou	
	8	1:34.22	Abbey Weitzeil (23.59); Claire Curzan (23.40); Katharine Berkoff (23.81); Kate Douglass (23.42)	US #3	21 December 2021	Abu Dhabi	
3	9	1:34.23	Meg Harris (23.98); Madison Wilson (23.51); Mollie O'Callaghan (24.01); Emma McKeon (22.73)	Australia	15 December 2022	Melbourne	
	10	1:34.24	Inge Dekker (24.09); Femke Heemskerk (23.24); Maud van der Meer (24.03); Ranomi Kromowidjojo (22.88)	Netherlands #6	7 December 2014	Doha	
4	11	1:34.30	Silvia di Pietro (23.39); Sara Curtis (22.90); Agata Maria Ambler (20.59); Costanza Cocconcelli (20.46)	Italy	2 December 2025	Lublin	
	12	1:34.34	Inge Dekker (24.06); Femke Heemskerk (23.79); Hinkelien Schreuder (23.40); Ranomi Kromowidjojo (23.49)	Netherlands #7	26 November 2010	Eindhoven	
5	13	1:34.54	Sarah Sjöström (23.33); Michelle Coleman (23.38); Sara Junevik (24.02); Louise Hansson (23.81)	Sweden	21 December 2021	Abu Dhabi	
	14	1:34.55	Ranomi Kromowidjojo (23.60); Femke Heemskerk (23.32); Kim Busch (23.84); Valerie van Roon (23.79)	Netherlands #8	16 December 2018	Hangzhou	
	15	1:34.61	Madison Kennedy (24.06); Abbey Weitzeil (23.40); Natalie Coughlin (23.39); Amy Bilquist (23.76)	US #4	7 December 2014	Doha	
	16	1:34.82	Inge Dekker (24.46); Hinkelien Schreuder (23.54); Ranomi Kromowidjojo (23.67); Marleen Veldhuis (23.15)	Netherlands #9	14 December 2007	Debrecen	
	17	1:34.89	Kim Busch (24.29); Maaike de Waard (23.71); Kira Toussaint (24.01); Ranomi Kromowidjojo (22.88)	Netherlands #10	21 December 2021	Abu Dhabi	
6	18	1:34.92	Rozaliya Nasretdinova (24.18); Arina Surkova (23.41); Maria Kameneva (23.70); Daria Klepikova (23.63)	Russia	2 November 2021	Kazan	
7	19	1:35.00	Michelle Williams (24.07); Sandrine Mainville (23.62); Taylor Ruck (23.77); Penny Oleksiak (23.54)	Canada	11 December 2016	Windsor	
7	19	1:35.00	Cheng Yujie (24.27); Zhang Yufei (23.12); Zhu Menghui (23.90); Wu Qingfeng (23.71)	China	21 December 2021	Abu Dhabi	
	21	1:35.21	Tamara van Vliet (24.19); Kira Toussaint (23.90); Femke Heemskerk (23.24); Valerie van Roon (23.62)	Netherlands #11	6 December 2019	Glasgow	
9	21	1:35.21	Béryl Gastaldello (23.85); Mélanie Henique (23.30); Léna Bousquin (24.40); Anna Santamans (23.66)	France	6 December 2019	Glasgow	
10	23	1:35.24	Julie Kepp Jensen (24.44); Jeanette Ottesen (23.61); Emilie Beckmann (23.99); Pernille Blume (23.20)	Denmark	6 December 2019	Glasgow	
	24	1:35.36	Kim Busch (24.20); Maaike de Waard (23.47); Kira Toussaint (24.01); Valerie van Roon (23.68)	Netherlands #12	15 December 2022	Melbourne	
	25	1:35.37	Tamara van Vliet (24.45); Ranomi Kromowidjojo (23.11); Maaike de Waard (24.09); Kim Busch (23.72)	Netherlands #13	11 December 2016	Windsor	

=== Mixed ===
- Correct as of October 2026

Nat.#	Perf.#	Time	Athletes	Team	Date	Place	Ref.
1	1	1:27.26	Leonardo Deplano (20.97); Lorenzo Zazzeri (20.51); Silvia Di Pietro (23.07); Sara Curtis (22.71)	Italy	4 December 2025	Lublin	
2	2	1:27.33	Maxime Grousset (20.92); Florent Manaudou (20.26); Béryl Gastaldello (23.00); Mélanie Henique (23.15)	France	16 December 2022	Melbourne	
3	3	1:27.75	Benjamin Proud (20.39); Lewis Burras (20.69); Anna Hopkin (22.95); Freya Anderson (23.72)	Great Britain	9 December 2023	Otopeni	
4	4	1:27.89	Caeleb Dressel (20.43); Ryan Held (20.60); Mallory Comerford (23.44); Kelsi Dahlia (23.42)	United States	12 December 2018	Hangzhou	
5	5	1:28.03	Kyle Chalmers (20.97); Matthew Temple (20.71); Meg Harris (23.73); Emma McKeon (22.62)	Australia	16 December 2022	Melbourne	
6	6	1:28.04	Szebasztián Szabó (20.93); Adam Jaszo (20.68); Petra Szenansky (23.29); Minna Abraham (23.14)	Hungary	4 December 2025	Lublin	
	7	1:28.28	Alessandro Miressi (20.87); Lorenzo Zazzeri (20.48); Jasmine Nocentini (23.39); Silvia di Pietro (23.54)	Italy #2	9 December 2023	Otopeni	
7	8	1:28.31	Vladimir Morozov (20.65); Vladislav Grinev (20.65); Arina Surkova (23.87); Maria Kameneva (23.17)	Russia	7 December 2019	Glasgow	
	9	1:28.35	Maxime Grousset (21.04); Florent Manaudou (20.50); Charlotte Bonnet (23.54); Beryl Gastaldello (23.27)	France #2	9 December 2023	Otopeni	
8	10	1:28.39	Nyls Korstanje (21.42); Kyle Stolk (20.66); Ranomi Kromowidjojo (23.01); Femke Heemskerk (23.30)	Netherlands	16 December 2017	Copenhagen	
	11	1:28.42	Brandon Van Den Berg (21.21); Sean Niewold (20.85); Marrit Steenbergen (23.22); Valerie van Roon (23.14)	Netherlands #2	4 December 2025	Lublin	
	12	1:28.50	Leonardo Deplano (20.80); Alessandro Miressi (21.01); Silvia Di Pietro (23.35); Sara Curtis (23.34)	Italy #3	13 December 2024	Budapest	
	13	1:28.51	Jesse Puts (21.17); Stan Pijnenburg (21.18); Ranomi Kromowidjojo (23.09); Femke Heemskerk (23.07)	Netherlands #3	12 December 2018	Hangzhou	
	14	1:28.53	Vladimir Morozov (20.55); Sergey Fesikov (20.67); Maria Kameneva (23.82); Rozaliya Nasretdinova (23.49)	Russia #2	16 December 2017	Copenhagen	
	14	1:28.53	Kenzo Simons (21.14); Thom de Boer (20.61); Maaike de Waard (23.35); Marrit Steenbergen (23.43)	Netherlands #4	16 December 2022	Melbourne	
9	16	1:28.55	Joshua Liendo (20.94); Yuri Kisil (20.99); Kayla Sanchez (23.51); Maggie Mac Neil (23.11)	Canada	17 December 2021	Abu Dhabi	
9	16	1:28.55	Piotr Ludwiczak (21.34); Kamil Sieradzki (20.72); Katarzyna Wasick (22.95); Kornelia Fiedkiewicz (23.54)	Poland	4 December 2025	Lublin	
	18	1:28.57	Josh Schneider (20.94); Matt Grevers (20.75); Madison Kennedy (23.63); Abbey Weitzeil (23.25)	US #2	6 December 2014	Doha	
	19	1:28.60	Ilya Kharun (20.8); Yuri Kisil (20.57); Ingrid Wilm (23.72); Mary-Sophie Harvey (23.51)	Canada #2	13 December 2024	Budapest	
	20	1:28.61	Jesse Puts (21.33); Thom de Boer (20.35); Ranomi Kromowidjojo (22.97); Kira Toussaint (23.96)	Netherlands #5	17 December 2021	Abu Dhabi	
	21	1:28.64	Duncan Scott (21.28); Scott McLay (20.79); Anna Hopkin (23.13); Freya Anderson (23.44)	Great Britain #2	7 December 2019	Glasgow	
	22	1:28.67	Egor Kornev (20.66); Pavel Samusenko (20.66); Arina Surkova (23.81); Daria Klepikova (23.54)	Russia #3	19 December 2025	Saint Petersburg	
	23	1:28.70	Thom de Boer (21.40); Ranomi Kromowidjojo (22.87); Femke Heemskerk (23.29); Jesse Puts (21.14)	Netherlands #6	7 August 2017	Berlin	
	24	1:28.73	Vladimir Morozov (20.75); Evgeny Sedov (20.66); Maria Kameneva (23.66); Rozaliya Nasretdinova (23.66)	Russia #4	12 December 2018	Hangzhou	
	20	1:28.77	Ivan Giryov (21.56); Aleksandr Shchegolev (20.57); Alexandra Kuznetsova (23.59); Alina Gaifutdinova (23.09)	Russia #5	19 December 2025	Saint Petersburg	

== World champions ==
=== Men ===
Edition	Winner	Time	Notes	Ref.
(Qatar) Doha 2014	Russia (RUS)	1:22.60	WR	
(Canada) Windsor 2016	Russia (RUS)	1:24.32		
(China) Hangzhou 2018	United States (USA)	1:21.80	WR	
(United Arab Emirates) Abu Dhabi 2021	Italy (ITA)	1:23.61		
(Australia) Melbourne 2022	Australia (AUS)	1:23.44		
2024–present	not included in the program			

=== Women ===
Edition	Winner	Time	Notes	Ref.
(Qatar) Doha 2014	Netherlands (NED)	1:34.24	WR	
(Canada) Windsor 2016	Canada (CAN)	1:35.00		
(China) Hangzhou 2018	United States (USA)	1:34.03	CR	
(United Arab Emirates) Abu Dhabi 2021	United States (USA)	1:34.22		
(Australia) Melbourne 2022	United States (USA)	1:33.89	CR	
2024–present	not included in the program			

=== Mixed ===
Edition	Winner	Time	Notes	Ref.
(Qatar) Doha 2014	United States (USA)	1:28.57	WR	
(Canada) Windsor 2016	Russia (RUS)	1:29.73		
(China) Hangzhou 2018	United States (USA)	1:27.89	WR	
(Netherlands) Abu Dhabi 2021	Canada (CAN)	1:28.55		
(Australia) Melbourne 2022	France (FRA)	1:27.33	WR	
(Hungary) Budapest 2024	Italy (ITA)	1:28.50		
