= Alexander Nemytarev =

Alexander Sergeyevich Nemytarev
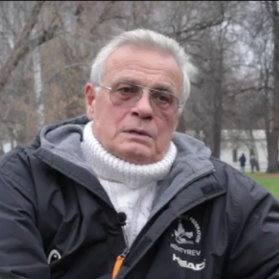
- Born: June 10, 1951; Moscow, USSR
- Education: Russian State University of Physical Education, Sport, Youth and Tourism
- Occupation: Swimming Coach
- Years active: 1960s–present
- Known for: Coaching Anton Chupkov, Rozaliya Nasretdinova
- Awards: Honored Coach of Russia

Alexander Sergeyevich Nemytarev (Russian: Александр Сергеевич Немтырев; born June 10, 1951, Moscow) is a Soviet-Russian swimming coach, Honored Coach of Russia, and a coach for the Russian national team since 2012.

== Biography ==
Alexander Nemytarev is a graduate of the GTSOLIFK, and a Master of Sports of the USSR in swimming. He began his coaching career in the 1960s in the Urals, where he was assigned after graduating from the university.

Since 2012, he has been a coach for the Russian national swimming team.

He is considered one of the foremost specialists in breaststroke training in Russia.

He works with elite athletes of the national team and is part of the coaching staff at World Championships, European Championships, and Olympic Games.

== Notable students ==
- Anton Chupkov - Honored Master of Sports of Russia, two-time world champion, two-time European champion, bronze medalist at the 2016 Olympic Games, former world record holder.
- Rozaliya Nasretdinova - Honored Master of Sports of Russia, two-time former world record holder.

== Awards and achievements ==
- Honored Coach of Russia
- Master of Sports of the USSR
- Laureate of the "Coach of the Year" award from the All-Russian Swimming Federation in 2014, 2016, 2018, and 2019.

== Family ==
Married.

== Quote ==
...ninety percent of success for us, for any coach, even in beginner children's groups, is psychology.

...when a coach hears and sees, feels a student, and the student fully trusts him, that's when there will be results.
