= Mélanie Henique =

French swimmer (born 1992)

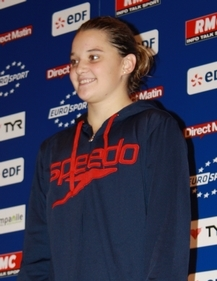

Personal information
- Nationality: French
- Born: 22 December 1992 (age 33) Amiens, France

Sport
- Sport: Swimming
- Strokes: Butterfly
- Club: Amiens Métropole Natation
Medal record
Women's swimming
Representing France
World Championships (LC)
Silver medal – second place	2022 Budapest	50 m butterfly
Silver medal – second place	2024 Doha	50 m butterfly
Bronze medal – third place	2011 Shanghai	50 m butterfly
World Championships (SC)
Gold medal – first place	2022 Melbourne	4×50 m mixed freestyle
Bronze medal – third place	2014 Doha	4×50 m medley
European Championships (LC)
Silver medal – second place	2020 Budapest	50 m butterfly
Bronze medal – third place	2010 Budapest	50 m butterfly
European Championships (SC)
Gold medal – first place	2012 Chartres	4×50 m mixed medley
Gold medal – first place	2019 Glasgow	50 m butterfly
Gold medal – first place	2019 Glasgow	4×50 m freestyle
Silver medal – second place	2019 Glasgow	50 m freestyle
Bronze medal – third place	2012 Chartres	50 m butterfly
Bronze medal – third place	2012 Chartres	4×50 m medley
Bronze medal – third place	2017 Copenhagen	4×50 m medley
Bronze medal – third place	2017 Copenhagen	4×50 m mixed medley
Bronze medal – third place	2019 Glasgow	4×50 m mixed freestyle
Mediterranean Games
Gold medal – first place	2009 Pescara	50 m butterfly
World Junior Championships
Silver medal – second place	2008 Monterrey	50 m butterfly

Mélanie Henique (born 22 December 1992) is a French competitive swimmer. She won a bronze medal in the 50 metre butterfly at the 2011 World Championships and a silver medal in the 50 metre butterfly at the 2022 World Aquatics Championships.

== Career ==
At the 2011 World Aquatics Championships, held in Shanghai, China, Henique achieved a time of 25.86 seconds in the final of the 50 metre butterfly and won the bronze medal, finishing 0.15 seconds behind gold medalist Inge Dekker of the Netherlands.

Henique qualified to represent France at the 2020 Summer Olympics. At the Olympic Games, held in Tokyo, Japan in 2021 due to the COVID-19 pandemic, she tied Simone Manuel of the United States for eleventh place in the 50 metre freestyle with a time of 24.63 seconds.

At the 2022 World Aquatics Championships, held at Danube Arena in Budapest, Hungary, Henique won the silver medal in the 50 metre butterfly with a time of 25.31 seconds, finishing less than four-tenths of a second behind gold medalist Sarah Sjöström of Sweden and one-hundredth of a second ahead of bronze medalist Zhang Yufei of China (also in 2024 but wins the mixed freestyle relay in 2022).

== Personal life ==
In 2014, she was 55th on Brigitte Fouré's list for the municipal elections in Amiens.

In 2015, being openly lesbian, she was a victim of a homophobic attack in Amiens, suffering from a broken nose and forcing her to withdraw from the French Swimming Open.

Records
Preceded by Shinri Shioura, Sayaka Akase, Kenta Ito, Kanako Watanabe	Mixed 4 × 50 metres freestyle relay world record-holder 21 October 2013 – 10 November 2013; With: Florent Manaudou, Jérémy Stravius, Anna Santamans	Succeeded by Tommaso D'Orsogna, Regan Leong, Bronte Campbell, Cate Campbell
