= Maria Reznikova =

Russian swimmer

Personal information
- Full name: Maria Sergeyevna Reznikova
- Nationality: Russia
- Born: February 2, 1994 (age 32) Moscow, Russia
- Years active: 2010–2015

Sport
- Sport: Freestyle swimming
- Club: FSO "Yunost Moskvy"
- Coach: A. Y. Kotov
Medal record
Women's swimming
European Championships (SC)
Gold medal – first place	2013 Herning	Mixed 4×50 m freestyle relay
Bronze medal – third place	2013 Herning	4×50 m freestyle relay
FINA Swimming World Cup
Gold medal – first place	2012 Moscow	Mixed 4×50 m freestyle relay
Silver medal – second place	2012 Moscow	Mixed 4×50 m freestyle relay
Bronze medal – third place	2012 Moscow	Mixed 4×50 m medley relay
Gold medal – first place	2013 Moscow	Mixed 4×50 m freestyle relay

Maria Sergeyevna Reznikova (Russian: Мария Сергеевна Резникова, romanized: Maria Sergeyevna Reznikova; born February 2, 1994 (age 32) in Moscow, Russia) is a Russian swimmer specializing in freestyle swimming. Reznikova is a former world record holder and has been awarded the title of Master of Sport of Russia, International Class. She is a European champion and medalist, as well as a multiple-time Russian champion in relay swimming.

== Biography ==
Reznikova began swimming under the guidance of coach Yuri Anatolyevich Korotkov and later trained with Alexey Yuryevich Kotov. She represented FSO "Yunost Moskvy".

At the 2013 European Short Course Swimming Championships in Herning, Denmark, she won the gold medal in the mixed 4×50 m freestyle relay.

In 2013, at a stage of the FINA Swimming World Cup, she, along with her teammates (Rozaliya Nasretdinova, Dmitry Ermakov, and Artem Lobuzov), set a world record in the mixed 4×50 m freestyle relay with a time of 1:29.53.

She is a many-time champion and medalist of the Russian Championships.

Reznikova retired from competitive swimming in 2015.

== Coaching career ==
After retiring, Reznikova became a swimming coach. She works with both children and adults, teaching basic techniques and helping athletes prepare for competitions.

Records
Preceded by (United States); Bailey Pressey (27.64); Stephanie Armstrong (26.36); Tanner Kurz (23.71); Cody Miller (23.55); September 26, 2013 - 1:41.16	World record – Mixed 4 × 50 m freestyle relay (Russia); Rozaliya Nasretdinova (24.56); Dmitry Ermakov (21.97); Artem Lobuzov (22.06); Maria Reznikova (24.42); October 13, 2013 - 1:33.01	Succeeded by (Japan); Shinri Shioura (21.63); Sayaka Akase (25.28); Kenta Ito (20.70); Kanako Watanabe (24.91); October 18, 2013 - 1:32.52
