= Vitaly Melnikov =

Vitaly Melnikov may refer to:

- Vitaly Melnikov (film director) (1928–2022), Russian film director
- Vitaly Melnikov (swimmer) (born 1990), Russian swimmer
