= Artem Lobuzov =

Russian swimmer

Personal information
- Full name: Artem Yuryevich Lobuzov
- Nationality: Russian
- Born: January 24, 1991 (age 35) Dinamo, Moscow, Russia
- Height: 183 cm (6 ft 0 in)
- Weight: 70 kg (154 lb)

Sport
- Sport: Swimming
- Strokes: Freestyle
- Coach: Olga Makarova
Medal record
World Championships (LC)
Silver medal – second place	2013 Barcelona	4×200 m freestyle
World Championships (SC)
Disqualified	2016 Windsor	4x200 m freestyle
Disqualified	2014 Doha	4×200 m freestyle
European Championships
Silver medal – second place	2014 Berlin	4×200 m freestyle

Artem Yuryevich Lobuzov (Russian: Артём Юрьевич Лобузов, born 24 January 1991) is a Russian swimmer who competes in freestyle events. He represented the Russian Federation at the Olympic Games. Lobuzov's lifetime best in the 200 m freestyle is 1.46:96 in long course, and 1:42.44 in short course.

In March 2022, Lobuzov received a back-acting four year suspension from FINA lasting 25 August 2021 through 24 August 2025 due to an anti-doping rule violation. Three months later, his results in two relays from 2014 and 2016 were formally disqualified and all relay members, including those not disqualified, had their medals re-allocated to the former silver medal teams, the relay teams from the United States in both cases.

== Swimming career ==
Lobuzov started swimming at the age of seven. He was originally more interested in basketball, but all his friends were swimmers so he joined in. In 2007, Lobuzov debuted in the national youth team at the European Youth Summer Olympic Festival in Belgrade. Artem won gold medals in the 4 x 200-meter freestyle relay and the mixed team event at a distance of 4 x 100. At the European Junior Swimming Championships 2008 in Belgrade, he won a silver medal in the 200-meter freestyle and two bronze medals in the 4x100-meter and 4x200-meter freestyle relays. In Prague in 2009, Artem won bronze in the 200-meter freestyle and took silver as part of the four in the 4x200 freestyle relay. He made his international debut at the adult level at the 2010 European Short Course Championships in Eindhoven.

=== 2011 FINA World Cup ===
At the short-course FINA World Cup in 2011 in Moscow, Lobuzov competed and set personal bests in two events. In the 100m Freestyle, he logged his a new personal best at 49.17 seconds. Although, he placed finished in ninth place, behind teammate Nikita Lobintsev who placed first, he beat Michael Phelps who finished in 11th. Lobuzov stated he was satisfied at the result of beating Phelps. In the 400m freestyle he also set a personal best, a time of 3:54:21. He finished in 13th place, again behind Lobintsev. The event was won by Paul Biedermann.

A day later, in the 200m Freestyle, Lobuzov reached the final, where he swam a time of 1:46:69 to finish in 6th place, with Biedermann winning again.

=== 2012 Summer Olympics ===
At the 2012 Summer Olympics in London, Lobuzov competed in the 200 meters freestyle and the men's 4 × 200 m freestyle relay.

On 29 July 2012, Lobuzov raced in the 200 meters freestyle. He swan in heat 6 against Brett Fraser (Cayman Island), Matthew Stanley (New Zealand), Thomas Fraser-Holmes (Australia), Sebastiaan Verschuren (Netherlands), Park Tae-Hwan (South Korea) and Yannick Agnel (France). Lobuzov finished in 6th in the heat, in a time of 1:47.91. He was the fifteenth fastest swimmer in the heats, qualifying for the semifinal. Lobuzov swam in the first semifinal. He was last in his heat and 16th overall, with a time of 1:48.26, and therefore did not qualify for the final.

On 31 July 2012, Lobuzov swam in the men's 4 × 200 m freestyle relay for Russia, with Evgeny Lagunov, Mikhail Polishchuk and Alexander Sukhorukov. They swam a time of 7:11.86, Lobuzov's leg was 1:48.30. They finished in fifth in the heat, and tenth overall, and therefore did not qualify for the final.

=== 2013 World Championships ===
At the 2013 World Championships, Lobuzov won his first international medal, winning silver as part of the Russian 4 × 200 m freestyle team.

In 2017, he was awarded the title of Honoured Master of Sport in the Russian Federation.

== Personal bests ==
Long Course:

Event	Time	Competition	Location	Date
100m Freestyle	49.63	Russian National Championships	Moscow	20 April 2015
200m Freestyle	1:46.96	Russian National Swimming Cup No. 10	Kazan	18 April 2013
400m Freestyle	3:53.74	Russian National Swimming Cup	Ruza	29 Jun 2012

Short Course:

Event	Time	Competition	Location	Date
100m Freestyle	48.22	Russian Short Course Championship	Kazan	11 November 2014
200m Freestyle	1:42.44	Vladimir Salnikov's Cup	St Petersburg	20 December 2009
400m Freestyle	3:43.67	FINA World Cup 2013 Stage 3	Eindhoven	7 August 2013

Records
Preceded by Bailey Pressey, Stephanie Armstrong, Tanner Kurz, Cody Miller	Mixed 4 × 50 metres freestyle relay world record-holder 13 October 2013 – 18 October 2013; With: Rozaliya Nasretdinova, Dmitry Ermakov, Maria Reznikova	Succeeded by Shinri Shioura, Sayaka Akase, Kenta Ito, Kanako Watanabe
