= Shinri Shioura =

Japanese swimmer (born 1991)

Personal information
- Full name: Shinri Shioura
- Nationality: Japan
- Born: 26 November 1991 (age 34) Isehara, Kanagawa
- Height: 1.88 m (6 ft 2 in)
- Weight: 89 kg (196 lb)

Sport
- Sport: Swimming
- Strokes: Freestyle
- College team: Chuo University
Medal record
Men's swimming
Representing Japan
Event	1st	2nd	3rd
World Championships (LC)	0	0	1
World Championships (SC)	0	1	3
Pan Pacific Championships	0	0	1
Asian Games	2	5	0
Universiade	1	0	2
Asian Championships	0	2	0
Youth World Championships	0	1	0
Total	3	9	7
World Championships (LC)
Bronze medal – third place	2013 Barcelona	4×100 m medley
World Championships (SC)
Silver medal – second place	2016 Windsor	100 m freestyle
Bronze medal – third place	2016 Windsor	100 m medley
Bronze medal – third place	2016 Windsor	4×50 m freestyle
Bronze medal – third place	2016 Windsor	4×100 m medley
Pan Pacific Championships
Bronze medal – third place	2018 Tokyo	4×100 m freestyle
Asian Games
Gold medal – first place	2018 Jakarta	100 m freestyle
Gold medal – first place	2018 Jakarta	4×100 m freestyle
Silver medal – second place	2014 Incheon	50 m freestyle
Silver medal – second place	2014 Incheon	100 m freestyle
Silver medal – second place	2014 Incheon	4×100 m freestyle
Silver medal – second place	2014 Incheon	4×100 m medley
Silver medal – second place	2018 Jakarta	4×100 m medley
Bronze medal – third place	2022 Hangzhou	4×100 m freestyle
Universiade
Gold medal – first place	2011 Shenzhen	4×100 m medley
Bronze medal – third place	2011 Shenzhen	50 m freestyle
Bronze medal – third place	2011 Shenzhen	100 m freestyle
Asian Championships
Silver medal – second place	2009 Foshan	4×200 m freestyle
Silver medal – second place	2009 Foshan	4×100 m medley
Youth World Championships
Silver medal – second place	2008 Monterrey	4×100 m medley

Shinri Shioura (塩浦 慎理, Shioura Shinri; born 26 November 1991) is a Japanese freestyle swimmer. He won the bronze medal by swimming for the Japanese team in the 4 × 100 m medley event at the 2013 World Aquatics Championships in Barcelona alongside his teammates Ryosuke Irie, Kosuke Kitajima and Takuro Fujii.

Records
Preceded by Rozaliya Nasretdinova, Dmitry Ermakov, Artem Lobuzov, Maria Reznikova	Mixed 4 × 50 metres freestyle relay world record-holder 18 October 2013 – 21 October 2013; With: Sayaka Akase, Kenta Ito, Kanako Watanabe	Succeeded by Florent Manaudou, Jérémy Stravius, Mélanie Henique, Anna Santamans
