= Anna Santamans =

French swimmer (born 1993)

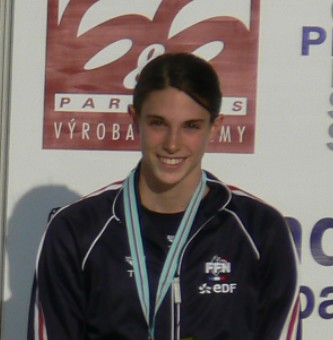

Personal information
- Born: 25 April 1993 (age 33) Arles, France
- Height: 1.77 m (5 ft 10 in)
- Weight: 61 kg (134 lb)

Sport
- Country: France
- Sport: Swimming
- Strokes: Freestyle, Butterfly
- Club: Olympic Nice Natation
Medal record
Women's swimming
Representing France
World Championships (SC)
Bronze medal – third place	2014 Doha	4×50 m medley
European Championships
Bronze medal – third place	2014 Berlin	4×100 m mixed freestyle
Bronze medal – third place	2016 London	4×100 m mixed freestyle
European Championships (SC)
Gold medal – first place	2012 Chartres	4×50 m mixed freestyle
Gold medal – first place	2012 Chartres	4×50 m mixed medley
Gold medal – first place	2019 Glasgow	4×50 m freestyle
Bronze medal – third place	2012 Chartres	4×50 m medley
Bronze medal – third place	2019 Glasgow	4×50 m mixed freestyle
Mediterranean Games
Gold medal – first place	2013 Mersin	50 m freestyle
Gold medal – first place	2013 Mersin	4×100 m freestyle
Silver medal – second place	2013 Mersin	50 m butterfly
Bronze medal – third place	2013 Mersin	4×100 m medley
Youth Olympic Games
Gold medal – first place	2010 Singapore	50 m freestyle
Bronze medal – third place	2010 Singapore	50 m butterfly
Bronze medal – third place	2010 Singapore	4×100 m mixed freestyle

Anna Santamans (born 25 April 1993) is a French swimmer. She competed at the 2012 Summer Olympics in London.

Records
Preceded by Shinri Shioura, Sayaka Akase, Kenta Ito, Kanako Watanabe	Mixed 4 × 50 metres freestyle relay world record-holder 21 October 2013 – 10 November 2013; With: Florent Manaudou, Jérémy Stravius, Mélanie Henique	Succeeded by Tomaso D'Orsogna, Regan Leong, Bronte Campbell, Cate Campbell
