= Josh Schneider =

American swimmer (born 1988)

Personal information
- National team: United States
- Born: January 11, 1988 (age 38) Cincinnati, Ohio, U.S.
- Education: University Cincinnati (2010, Business/Finance)
- Occupations: Swim Coach, U. Cincinnati; Licensed Realtor, Ky/Ohio
- Height: 6 ft 4 in (193 cm)

Sport
- Sport: Swimming
- Strokes: Freestyle
- Club: New York Athletic Club (Post-College)
- College team: University of Cincinnati
- Coach: Monty Hopkins (U. Cincinnati); Mandy Commons-DiSalle (2014-16)
Medal record
Men's swimming
Representing the United States
World Championships (SC)
Gold medal – first place	2010 Dubai	4×100 m medley
Gold medal – first place	2014 Doha	4×50 m mixed free
Silver medal – second place	2014 Doha	4×50 m freestyle
Bronze medal – third place	2010 Dubai	50 m freestyle
Bronze medal – third place	2014 Doha	4×50 m medley
Pan American Games
Gold medal – first place	2015 Toronto	50 m freestyle
Silver medal – second place	2015 Toronto	4×100 m medley
Bronze medal – third place	2015 Toronto	4×100 m freestyle

Josh Schneider (born January 11, 1988) is an American competition swimmer who competed for the University of Cincinnati, graduating around 2010. He is a two-time medalist at the FINA Short Course World Championships and a former American record holder in the 50-meter freestyle (short course). Beginning around 2014, he served as an Assistant swim coach for his Alma mater, the University of Cincinnati.

Schneider was born January 11, 1988 in Cincinnati, Ohio, one of three siblings to mother, Sue, who had a business, and father Greg Schneider, a former fire fighter. With a relatively late start, Josh began swimming at 14. He attended Taylor High School, known then as North Bend Taylor, around 25 miles West of Cincinnati, where he received eleven varsity letters, graduating in the summer of 2006. As a multi-sport athlete, he competed and lettered for Taylor High in the sports of swimming, football, golf and track. During his High School career, he won an Ohio State title in the 50 meter freestyle with a time of 21.06 on February 4, 2006, and placed seventh in the 100m free in the State championship. Holding records in several sports, he established school records while running track in the 110-meter hurdles and the 300-meter dash. In football, he held school-records for completing 46 pass receptions, the most in a season.

== University of Cincinnati ==
He attended the University of Cincinnati from around 2006-2010, under long-serving Head Coach Monty Hopkins. Coach Hopkins began coaching Cincinnati around 2001, and was a former competitor at the National Swimming Championships with the strong Cincinnati Marlins team.

At Cincinnati, where he majored in business, Schneider was a one-time NCAA champion, winning the 50-yard freestyle in 2010. He was one of only two NCAA champions from the University of Cincinnati as of 2015. At USC, he was an All-American five times, a seven-time Big East Conference champion in seven instances, and was honored as a BIG EAST Male Swimmer of the Year twice. He left U. Cincinnati with school records in five events, many of which have held for years. His University of Cinncinnati records included the 200 freestyle, 100 freestyle, and 50 freestyle. Skilled as a multi-stroke competitor, his Cincinnati records also include the 100 butterfly and 50 butterfly.

== 2010 FINA World Championships ==
At the 2010 FINA Short Course World Championships in Dubai, Schneider won the bronze in the 50 m freestyle. Schneider, who was swimming in lane eight, only qualified for the final after winning a swim-off against Australian Kyle Richardson. Schneider also earned a gold medal in the 4×100 m medley relay for his contributions in the heats.

=== 2012 Olympic trials ===
At the Olympic Trials in 2012, competing in the 50-meter freestyle event, he made the final, swimming a time of 21.78 in the qualifying preliminaries, his best time for a long-course in the event.

== 2014 FINA World Championships ==
At the 2014 FINA World Swimming Championships (25 m) in Doha, Qatar, Schneider was part of the gold medal team with the 4x50 Mixed Freestyle Relay. He also was part of the silver medal team for the Men's 4x50m Freestyle and won a bronze with the Men's 4x50 Medley.

== 2015 Pan American Games ==
At the 2015 Pan American Games in Toronto, Canada, Schneider won the 50m Freestyle with a time of 21.86, taking the gold medal. He also received a silver in the 4 × 100 m medley relay and a bronze in the 4 × 100 m freestyle relay.

Schneider has also won the inaugural two editions of the RCP Tiburon Sprint Classic, a 50-yard freestyle match race held in the backyard pool of swimming philanthropist Tod Spieker, in which the winner claims a $10,000 grand prize.

After the 2016 trials, Schneider retired from elite competitive swimming.

== Careers ==
=== Coaching ===
He has served as a coach at his alma mater, the University of Cincinnati, beginning as an Assistant Coach in 2014-15. While coaching, he trained under head Cincinnati varsity swim coach Mandy Commons-DiSalle, who had also mentored him as an Assistant Coach. Commons-DiSalle, who began as Head Coach at Cincinnati around 2013, had coached at Cincinnati since around 2010. Around 2017, he left coaching at Cincinnati.

=== Real Estate ===
Schneider has since worked in Real Estate, and was licensed as a realtor in Kentucky and Ohio. He has worked as an Associate for ReMax in Ohio's West Chester, where he focused on residential properties.

=== Honors ===
Schneider was named a University of Cinncinnati Male Athlete of the Year in 2008-9.

Records
Preceded by Sergey Fesikov, Vladimir Morozov, Rozaliya Nasretdinova, Veronika Popova	Mixed 4 × 50 metres freestyle relay world record-holder 6 December 2014 – present With: Matt Grevers, Madison Kennedy, Abbey Weitzeil	Succeeded by Incumbents
