= 2016 FINA World Swimming Championships (25 m) – Men's 100 metre freestyle =

Men's 100 metre freestyle at the 2016 FINA World Swimming Championships (25 m)
- Venue: WFCU Centre
- Dates: 10 December (heats and semifinals); 11 December (final)
- Competitors: 145 from 101 nations
- Winning time: 46.57

Medalists
gold medal	Simonas Bilis	Lithuania
silver medal	Shinri Shioura	Japan
bronze medal	Tommaso D'Orsogna	Australia

The Men's 100 metre freestyle competition of the 2016 FINA World Swimming Championships (25 m) was held on 10 and 11 December 2016.

== Records ==
Prior to the competition, the existing world and championship records were as follows.

	Name	Nation	Time	Location	Date
World record	Amaury Leveaux	France	44.94	Rijeka	13 December 2008
Championship record	Vladimir Morozov	Russia	45.51	Doha	3 December 2014

== Results ==
=== Heats ===
The Heats were held at 10:52.

Rank	Heat	Lane	Name	Nationality	Time	Notes
1	15	6	Blake Pieroni	United States	46.76	Q
2	13	5	Yuri Kisil	Canada	46.79	Q
3	14	4	Mehdy Metella	France	47.13	Q
4	12	2	Park Tae-Hwan	South Korea	47.19	Q
5	13	2	Simonas Bilis	Lithuania	47.39	Q
6	14	0	Mislav Sever	Croatia	47.43	Q
7	12	4	Marius Kusch	Germany	47.48	Q
8	14	3	Clément Mignon	France	47.53	Q
9	11	5	Matias Koski	Finland	47.55	Q
10	15	5	Tommaso D'Orsogna	Australia	47.57	Q
11	14	5	Michael Chadwick	United States	47.60	Q
12	14	6	Shinri Shioura	Japan	47.68	Q
13	16	6	Oussama Sahnoune	Algeria	47.70	Q
14	14	2	Luca Dotto	Italy	47.72	Q
15	12	6	Benjamin Hockin	Paraguay	47.78	Q
15	15	3	Nikita Lobintsev	Russia	47.78	Q
17	1	7	Anders Lie Nielsen	Denmark	47.81	
18	16	4	Vladimir Morozov	Russia	47.82	
19	15	7	Christoffer Carlsen	Sweden	47.88	
20	14	9	Douglas Erasmus	South Africa	47.96	
21	11	2	Miguel Nascimento	Portugal	48.00	
22	14	7	Brayden McCarthy	Australia	48.03	
23	16	7	Daniel Hunter	New Zealand	48.04	
24	13	7	Kristian Golomeev	Greece	48.07	
25	14	1	Yongquing Lin	China	48.13	
26	16	3	Adam Barrett	Great Britain	48.14	
27	16	5	Pieter Timmers	Belgium	48.15	
28	10	6	Maksim Lobanovskii	Hungary	48.19	
28	13	0	Apostolos Christou	Greece	48.19	
30	15	4	Chad le Clos	South Africa	48.31	
31	12	5	Markus Lie	Norway	48.33	
31	16	8	Kyle Stolk	Netherlands	48.33	
33	15	1	Artsiom Machexin	Belarus	48.37	
34	14	8	Kenta Ito	Japan	48.39	
35	16	2	Mindaugas Sadauskas	Lithuania	48.44	
36	13	4	Khader Baqlah	Jordan	48.53	
37	16	0	Nyls Korstanje	Netherlands	48.54	
38	16	1	Jasper Aerents	Belgium	48.57	
39	11	1	Daniel Carranza	Mexico	48.58	
40	12	3	Fernando Scheffer	Brazil	48.67	
41	13	9	Jan Šefl	Czech Republic	48.69	
42	15	8	Baslakov Iskender	Turkey	48.74	
43	12	1	Andrii Khloptsov	Ukraine	48.77	
43	12	7	Sebastian Ovesen	Denmark	48.77	
43	16	9	Anton Latkin	Belarus	48.77	
46	13	8	Markus Thormeyer	Canada	48.85	
47	15	9	David Gamburg	Israel	48.92	
48	13	6	Ádám Telegdy	Hungary	49.08	
49	15	0	Vladimir Stefanik	Slovakia	49.13	
50	10	4	Jordan Sloan	Ireland	49.16	
51	11	4	Uvis Kalnins	Latvia	49.17	
52	12	0	Kin Tat Kent Cheung	Hong Kong	49.22	
53	10	3	Charles Hockin Brusquetti	Paraguay	49.30	
54	13	1	Hexin Yu	China	49.33	
55	13	3	Daniel Forndal	Sweden	49.52	
56	8	6	Moktar Al-Yamani	Yemen	49.55	
57	11	6	Mazen Elkamash	Egypt	49.56	
58	12	9	Kai Quan Yeo	Singapore	49.57	
59	11	7	Tomas Franta	Czech Republic	49.59	
60	10	8	Luis Flores Bellina	Puerto Rico	49.61	
61	11	9	Aron Orn Stefansson	Iceland	49.65	
62	8	8	Gabriel Lopes	Portugal	49.69	
63	1	2	Igor Mogne	Mozambique	49.76	
64	10	5	Xander Skinner	Namibia	49.77	
65	9	6	Kevin Avila	Guatemala	49.79	
66	10	9	Angelo Simic	Bosnia and Herzegovina	49.86	
67	6	4	Marko Blazhevski	Macedonia	50.17	
68	11	0	Matthew Zammit	Malta	50.19	
69	5	1	Kyle Abeysinghe	Sri Lanka	50.23	
70	7	5	Alex Sobers	Barbados	50.35	
71	8	9	Abdoul Niane	Senegal	50.38	
72	9	5	Sam Seghers	Papua New Guinea	50.39	
73	11	8	Oliver Elliot	Chile	50.40	
74	9	4	Gabriel Fleitas	Uruguay	50.62	
75	7	7	Ho Lun Raymond Mak	Hong Kong	50.63	
76	10	2	Ilijan Malcic	Bosnia and Herzegovina	50.65	
77	9	3	Jean-Luc Joel Zephir	Saint Lucia	50.89	
78	7	8	Axel Ngui	Philippines	50.97	
79	10	7	Mathieu Marquet	Mauritius	51.04	
80	9	2	Matt Galea	Malta	51.14	
81	8	4	Matias Pinto	Chile	51.16	
82	9	1	Jhonny Perez	Dominican Republic	51.30	
83	9	0	Juan Dobles	Costa Rica	51.36	
84	10	1	Stanislav Karnaukhov	Kyrgyzstan	51.60	
85	10	0	Arsham Mirzaei	Iran	51.73	
86	9	7	Dylan Koo	Singapore	51.85	
87	7	4	Steven Kimani Maina	Kenya	51.90	
88	5	2	Adel Elfakir	Libya	51.97	
88	8	7	Teimuraz Kobakhidze	Georgia	51.97	
90	5	0	Irakli Revishivili	Georgia	52.01	
91	7	6	Abdullah Al-Doori	Iraq	52.12	
92	8	0	Pedro Pinotes	Angola	52.15	
93	6	6	Alex Mccallum	Cayman Islands	52.20	
94	8	2	Omiros Zagkas	Cyprus	52.22	
95	5	9	Eric Fernandez Malvar	Andorra	52.23	
95	6	5	Anthony Barbar	Lebanon	52.23	
97	5	5	Hugo González Miranda	Panama	52.24	
98	7	0	Jim Sanderson	Gibraltar	52.29	
99	1	3	Sebastien Kouma	Mali	52.30	
100	6	3	Adrian Hoek	Curaçao	52.32	
101	1	1	Mohammad Mahfizur Rahman	Bangladesh	52.65	
102	8	5	Miguel Mena	Nicaragua	52.67	
103	4	5	Stanford Kawale	Papua New Guinea	52.78	
104	4	2	Antonio González	Costa Rica	52.80	
105	8	1	Eisner Barberena Espinoza	Nicaragua	52.89	
106	7	2	Vladimir Mamikonyan	Armenia	52.96	
107	9	9	Vahan Mkhitaryan	Armenia	53.00	
108	6	0	Delgerkhuu Myagmar	Mongolia	53.01	
109	5	3	Stefano Mitchell	Antigua and Barbuda	53.05	
109	6	7	Joao Matias	Angola	53.05	
111	6	8	Ivan Soruco	Bolivia	53.09	
112	5	6	Jeancarlo Calderon Harper	Panama	53.24	
113	4	9	Hannibal David Gaskin	Guyana	53.33	
114	6	2	Issa Mohamed	Kenya	53.46	
115	4	6	Dean Hoffmann	Seychelles	53.50	
116	1	6	Jeremy Bryan Lim	Philippines	53.56	
117	5	7	George Jabbour	Honduras	53.79	
118	5	8	Zandanbal Gunsennorov	Mongolia	53.93	
119	6	1	Heriniavo Rasolonjatovo	Madagascar	54.08	
120	6	9	Christian Nikles	Brunei	54.09	
121	7	3	Cheng Man Yum	Macau	54.17	
122	3	3	Matthew Ives	Botswana	54.25	
123	3	2	Temaruata Strickland	Cook Islands	54.61	
124	4	1	Samuele Rossi	Seychelles	54.63	
125	4	8	David Hitchcock	Gibraltar	55.01	
126	4	4	Marco Flores	Honduras	55.09	
127	4	7	Franci Aleksi	Albania	55.58	
128	3	0	Tanner Poppe	Guam	56.17	
129	3	4	Ibrahim Nishwan	Maldives	56.25	
130	4	0	Andrew Fowler	Guyana	56.42	
131	2	6	Adil Bharmal	Tanzania	56.60	
132	3	6	Daryl Appleton	Antigua and Barbuda	56.82	
133	3	5	Nabeel Hatoum	Palestine	57.08	
134	3	8	Christian Villacrusis	Northern Mariana Islands	57.39	
135	3	7	Cruz Halbich	Saint Vincent and the Grenadines	57.51	
136	2	7	Olim Kurbanov	Tajikistan	57.62	
137	2	2	Salofi Charles Welch	Northern Mariana Islands	57.65	
138	2	1	Tongli Panuve	Tonga	57.97	
139	3	1	Devin Tyrek Boodha	Saint Lucia	58.47	
140	2	0	Michael Swift	Malawi	59.15	
141	2	5	Aaron de Freitas	Saint Vincent and the Grenadines	59.18	
142	2	4	Tommy Imazu	Guam	1.00.17	
143	3	9	Albarchir Mouctar	Niger	1.00.65	
144	2	8	Simphiwe Dlamini	Eswatini	1.02.90	
145	1	4	Alijon Khairulloev	Tajikistan	1.03.84	
	1	5	Frantz Dorsainvil	Haiti		DNS
	2	3	Belly-Cresus Ganira	Burundi		DNS
	2	9	Jefferson Kpanou	Benin		DNS
	4	3	Bakr Salam Ali Al-Dulaimi	Iraq		DNS
	5	4	Paul Elaisa	Fiji		DNS
	7	1	David van der Colff	Botswana		DNS
	7	9	Thibault Danho	Ivory Coast		DNS
	8	3	Ayman Kelzi	Syria		DNS
	9	8	Meli Malani	Fiji		DNS
	11	3	Riku Pöytäkivi	Finland		DNS
	12	8	Aleksey Tarasenko	Uzbekistan		DNS
	15	2	Dylan Carter	Trinidad and Tobago		DNS

=== Semifinals ===
The Semifinals were held at 18:44.

==== Semifinal 1 ====
Rank	Lane	Name	Nationality	Time	Notes
1	7	Shinri Shioura	Japan	46.77	Q
2	5	Taehwan Park	South Korea	46.89	Q
3	1	Luca Dotto	Italy	47.12	Q
4	2	Tommaso D'Orsogna	Australia	47.30	Q
5	3	Mislav Sever	Croatia	47.40	
6	4	Yuri Kisil	Canada	47.42	
7	8	Nikita Lobintsev	Russia	47.43	
8	6	Clément Mignon	France	47.64	

==== Semifinal 2 ====
Rank	Lane	Name	Nationality	Time	Notes
1	4	Blake Pieroni	United States	46.70	Q
2	3	Simonas Bilis	Lithuania	46.73	Q
3	5	Mehdy Metella	France	47.16	Q
4	6	Marius Kusch	Germany	47.27	Q
5	1	Oussama Sahnoune	Algeria	47.39	
6	2	Matias Koski	Finland	47.65	
6	8	Benjamin Hockin	Paraguay	47.65	
8	7	Michael Chadwick	United States	47.96	

=== Final ===
The final was held at 19:04.

Rank	Lane	Name	Nationality	Time	Notes
1st place, gold medalist(s)	5	Simonas Bilis	Lithuania	46.58	
2nd place, silver medalist(s)	3	Shinri Shioura	Japan	46.59	AS
3rd place, bronze medalist(s)	8	Tommaso D'Orsogna	Australia	46.70	
4	4	Blake Pieroni	United States	46.88	
5	2	Luca Dotto	Italy	46.95	
6	7	Mehdy Metella	France	47.08	
7	6	Taehwan Park	South Korea	47.09	
8	1	Marius Kusch	Germany	47.44	
