= Rozaliya Nasretdinova =

Russian swimmer

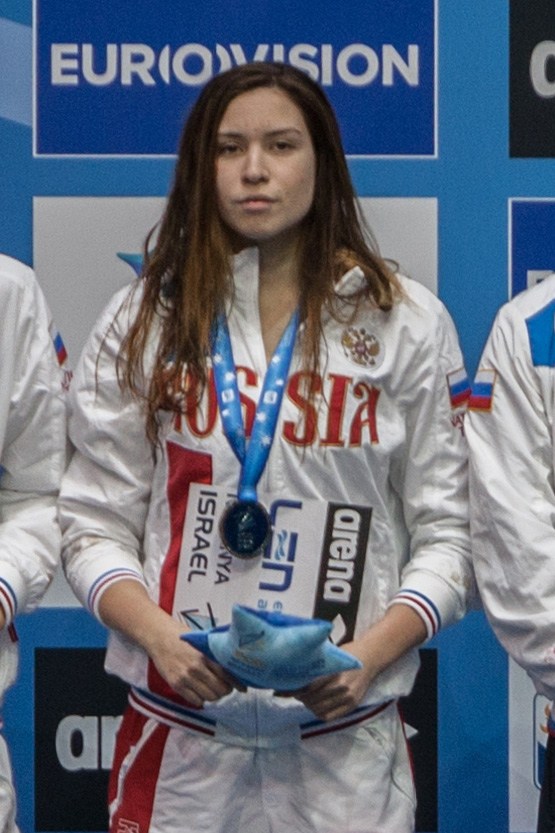
- Nasretdinova at the 2015 European Short Course Swimming Championships in Netanya

Personal information
- Full name: Rozaliya Haydyarovna Nasretdinova
- National team: Russia
- Born: 10 February 1997 (age 29) Moscow, Russia

Sport
- Sport: Swimming
- Strokes: butterfly, freestyle
- Club: Russian State University of Physical Education, Sport, Youth and Tourism
Medal record
Women's swimming
Representing Russian Swimming Federation
World Championships (SC)
Bronze medal – third place	2021 Abu Dhabi	4×50 m mixed freestyle
Representing Russia
World Championships (SC)
Gold medal – first place	2016 Windsor	4×50 m mixed freestyle
Silver medal – second place	2014 Doha	4×50 m mixed freestyle
Bronze medal – third place	2018 Hangzhou	4×50 m mixed freestyle
Bronze medal – third place	2018 Hangzhou	4×50 m mixed medley
European Championships (LC)
Bronze medal – third place	2018 Glasgow	4×100 m mixed freestyle
European Championships (SC)
Gold medal – first place	2013 Herning	4×50 m mixed freestyle
Gold medal – first place	2021 Kazan	4×50 m freestyle
Silver medal – second place	2012 Chartres	4×50 m mixed freestyle
Silver medal – second place	2015 Netanya	4×50 m mixed freestyle
Silver medal – second place	2015 Netanya	4×50 m mixed medley
Silver medal – second place	2017 Copenhagen	4×50 m mixed freestyle
Bronze medal – third place	2013 Herning	4×50 m freestyle
Bronze medal – third place	2015 Netanya	4×50 m freestyle
Bronze medal – third place	2021 Kazan	4×50 m mixed medley
Summer Universiade
Gold medal – first place	2015 Gwangju	50 m freestyle
Bronze medal – third place	2015 Gwangju	4×100 m freestyle
Summer Youth Olympics
Gold medal – first place	2014 Nanjing	50 m freestyle
Gold medal – first place	2014 Nanjing	50 m butterfly
Silver medal – second place	2014 Nanjing	4×100 m freestyle

Rozaliya Haydyarovna Nasretdinova (Russian: Розалия Хайдяровна Насретдинова), (born 10 February 1997) is a Russian swimmer. She is of Tatar and Russian roots.

== Career ==
In 2012, Nasretdinova competed in her first 2012 European Junior Championships taking silver in 50 m freestyle and gold in 4 × 100 m freestyle. The same year, she competed in seniors at the 2012 European Short Course Swimming Championships taking silver in 4×50 m mixed freestyle.

In 2013, Nasretdinova won 4 gold medals at the 2013 European Junior Championships, in 50 m freestyle, 50 m butterfly, 4 × 100 m freestyle and 4 × 100 m mixed freestyle. She won gold in 4×50 m mixed freestyle and bronze in 4×50 m freestyle at the 2013 European Short Course Swimming Championships. Nasretdinova (together with Svetlana Chimrova, Daria Ustinova and Yulia Efimova's) gold in 4×50 m medley at the 2013 European Short Course Championships was later disqualified due to Yulia Efimova's alleged positive test for DHEA, a prescription steroid banned in professional sports.

In 2014, Nasretdinova won 2 gold medals in swimming at the 2014 Youth Olympic Games in Nanjing, China in 50 m freestyle and 50 m butterfly. She has competed at the 2014 FINA World Swimming Championships (25 m) in Doha, Qatar taking silver in 4×50 m mixed freestyle (with Vladimir Morozov, Veronika Popova, Evgeny Sedov, Oleg Tikhobaev, Margarita Nesterova and Nikita Konovalov).

Records
Preceded by Bailey Pressey, Stephanie Armstrong, Tanner Kurz, Cody Miller	Mixed 4 × 50 metres freestyle relay world record-holder 13 October 2013 – 18 October 2013; With: Dmitry Ermakov, Artem Lobuzov, Maria Reznikova	Succeeded by Shinri Shioura, Sayaka Akase, Kenta Ito, Kanako Watanabe
Preceded by Tomaso D'Orsogna, Travis Mahoney, Cate Campbell, Bronte Campbell	Mixed 4 × 50 metres freestyle relay world record-holder 14 December 2013 – 6 December 2014; With: Sergey Fesikov, Vladimir Morozov, Veronika Popova	Succeeded by Josh Schneider, Matt Grevers, Madison Kennedy, Abbey Weitzeil
