= 2013 European Short Course Swimming Championships =

Water sport competitions

- Host city: Herning, Denmark
- Date: 12–15 December
- Venue: Jyske Bank Boxen
- Nations: 42
- Athletes: 559
- Events: 40

The 2013 European Short Course Swimming Championships took place in Herning, Denmark, from 12 to 15 December 2013.

== Results ==
=== Men's events ===
Event	Gold		Silver		Bronze	
50 m freestyle	Vladimir Morozov; Russia	20.77	Marco Orsi; Italy	21.00	Andriy Hovorov; Ukraine	21.17
100 m freestyle	Vladimir Morozov; Russia	45.96	Danila Izotov; Russia	46.41	Marco Orsi; Italy	46.49
200 m freestyle	Danila Izotov; Russia	1:41.70	Nikita Lobintsev; Russia	1:42.33	Dominik Kozma; Hungary; Filippo Magnini; Italy	1:43.34
400 m freestyle	Nikita Lobintsev; Russia	3:39.47	Andrea D'Arrigo; Italy	3:40.54	Velimir Stjepanović; Serbia	3:40.91 NR
1500 m freestyle	Gergely Gyurta; Hungary	14:30.26	Pál Joensen; Faroe Islands	14:35.99	Gabriele Detti; Italy	14:36.43
50 m backstroke	Jérémy Stravius; France	23.19	Christian Diener; Germany	23.38	Pavel Sankovich; Belarus	23.45
100 m backstroke ^{[a]}	Jérémy Stravius; France	49.74	Camille Lacourt; France; Chris Walker-Hebborn; Great Britain	50.44	Not awarded as there was a tie for silver.	
200 m backstroke	Radosław Kawęcki; Poland	1:49.42	Péter Bernek; Hungary	1:50.43	Christian Diener; Germany	1:51.40
50 m breaststroke	Damir Dugonjič; Slovenia	26.21	Giacomo Perez-Dortona; France	26.55	Barry Murphy; Ireland	26.56
100 m breaststroke	Dániel Gyurta; Hungary	57.08	Marco Koch; Germany	57.14	Damir Dugonjič; Slovenia	57.24
200 m breaststroke	Dániel Gyurta; Hungary	2:00.72	Michael Jamieson; Great Britain	2:01.43	Marco Koch; Germany	2:01.62
50 m butterfly	Andriy Hovorov; Ukraine	22.36	Steffen Deibler; Germany	22.41	Yauhen Tsurkin; Belarus	22.45
100 m butterfly	Yevgeny Korotyshkin; Russia	49.68	Jérémy Stravius; France	50.09	Steffen Deibler; Germany	50.23
200 m butterfly	Velimir Stjepanović; Serbia	1:51.27 NR	Paweł Korzeniowski; Poland	1:51.36	Nikolay Skvortsov; Russia	1:51.62
100 m individual medley	Vladimir Morozov; Russia	51.20	Sergey Fesikov; Russia	52.23	Stefano Pizzamiglio; Italy	52.81
200 m individual medley	Philip Heintz; Germany	1:53.98	Simon Sjödin; Sweden	1:54.28	Diogo Carvalho; Portugal	1:54.89
400 m individual medley	Dávid Verrasztó; Hungary	4:03.48	Gal Nevo; Israel	4:03.50	Federico Turrini; Italy	4:03.94
4 × 50 m freestyle relay	Russia; Vladimir Morozov; Sergey Fesikov; Yevgeny Lagunov; Nikita Konovalov; Aleksandr Popkov; Viacheslav Andrusenko	1:23.36	Italy; Luca Dotto; Federico Bocchia; Filippo Magnini; Marco Orsi; Luca Leonardi; Federico Turrini	1:24.37	Belgium; Jasper Aerents; Pieter Timmers; François Heersbrandt; Yoris Grandjean	1:24.86
4 × 50 m medley relay ^{[b]}	Italy; Stefano Pizzamiglio; Francesco Di Lecce; Piero Codia; Marco Orsi; Niccolò Bonacchi; Luca Dotto	1:32.83	Germany; Christian Diener; Hendrik Feldwehr; Steffen Deibler; Maximilian Oswald	1:33.06	Belarus; Pavel Sankovich; Yury Klemparski; Yauhen Tsurkin; Artyom Machekin	1:34.56

Legend: WR – World record; WBT – World best time; ER – European record; CR – Championship record

- ^{Men's 100 m backstroke} Vitaly Melnikov of Russia originally won the silver medal, but was disqualified in 2015 after testing positive for EPO.
- ^{Men's 4 × 50 m medley relay} The Russian relay (made up of Vitaly Melnikov, Oleg Kostin, Nikita Konovalov and Vladimir Morozov) originally won the gold medal, but was disqualified in 2015 after Vitaly Melnikov tested positive for EPO.

=== Women's events ===
Event	Gold		Silver		Bronze	
50 m freestyle	Ranomi Kromowidjojo; Netherlands	23.36	Sarah Sjöström; Sweden	23.79	Aleksandra Gerasimenya; Belarus	23.83
100 m freestyle	Ranomi Kromowidjojo; Netherlands	51.78	Sarah Sjöström; Sweden	51.99	Aleksandra Gerasimenya; Belarus	52.34
200 m freestyle	Federica Pellegrini; Italy	1:52.80	Charlotte Bonnet; France	1:53.26	Veronika Popova; Russia	1:53.62
400 m freestyle	Mireia Belmonte; Spain	3:56.14	Lotte Friis; Denmark	3:58.35	Federica Pellegrini; Italy	3:58.90
800 m freestyle	Mireia Belmonte; Spain	8:05.18	Lotte Friis; Denmark	8:08.68	Sharon van Rouwendaal; Netherlands	8:14.24
50 m backstroke	Simona Baumrtová; Czech Republic	26.26 NR	Aleksandra Urbanczyk; Poland	26.31	Michelle Coleman; Sweden	26.67
100 m backstroke	Mie Nielsen; Denmark	55.99; CR, ER	Simona Baumrtová; Czech Republic	56.28 NR	Daryna Zevina; Ukraine	56.94
200 m backstroke	Daryna Zevina; Ukraine	2:02.20	Simona Baumrtová; Czech Republic	2:03.06 NR	Katinka Hosszú; Hungary	2:03.81
50 m breaststroke ^{[c]}	Rūta Meilutytė; Lithuania	29.10; CR	Moniek Nijhuis; Netherlands	29.79	Jennie Johansson; Sweden	29.80
100 m breaststroke ^{[d]}	Rūta Meilutytė; Lithuania	1:02.92; CR	Rikke Møller Pedersen; Denmark	1:04.39	Jennie Johansson; Sweden	1:05.13
200 m breaststroke ^{[e]}	Rikke Møller Pedersen; Denmark	2:15.21; CR, ER	Vitalina Simonova; Russia	2:18.88	Giulia De Ascentis; Italy	2:20.93
50 m butterfly	Sarah Sjöström; Sweden	24.90; CR	Jeanette Ottesen; Denmark	25.03	Inge Dekker; Netherlands	25.29
100 m butterfly	Sarah Sjöström; Sweden	55.78	Jemma Lowe; Great Britain	56.32	Jeanette Ottesen; Denmark	56.42
200 m butterfly	Mireia Belmonte; Spain	2:01.52; CR, ER	Franziska Hentke; Germany	2:03.47	Jemma Lowe; Great Britain	2:04.51
100 m individual medley	Rūta Meilutytė; Lithuania	57.68; CR	Katinka Hosszú; Hungary	57.96	Siobhan-Marie O'Connor; Great Britain	58.26
200 m individual medley	Katinka Hosszú; Hungary	2:04.33; CR	Siobhan-Marie O'Connor; Great Britain	2:06.73	Sophie Allen; Great Britain	2:06.86
400 m individual medley	Mireia Belmonte; Spain	4:21.23; CR	Katinka Hosszú; Hungary	4:24.69	Aimee Willmott; Great Britain	4:25.37
4 × 50 m freestyle relay	Denmark; Pernille Blume; Jeanette Ottesen; Kelly Riber Rasmussen; Mie Nielsen; Julie Levisen	1:37.04; WR	Sweden; Michelle Coleman; Sarah Sjöström; Louise Hansson; Magdalena Kuras	1:37.08	Russia; Rozaliya Nasretdinova; Veronika Popova; Elizaveta Bazarova; Svetlana Knyaginina; Mariya Reznikova; Svetlana Chimrova	1:37.13
4 × 50 m medley relay ^{[f]}	Denmark; Mie Nielsen; Rikke Møller Pedersen; Jeanette Ottesen; Pernille Blume	1:44.81	Sweden; Michelle Coleman; Jennie Johansson; Sarah Sjöström; Louise Hansson; Josefin Lindkvist; Magdalena Kuras	1:46.08	Great Britain; Fran Halsall; Sophie Allen; Jemma Lowe; Siobhan-Marie O'Connor	1:46.56

Legend: WR – World record; WBT – World best time; ER – European record; CR – Championship record

- ^{Women's 50 m breaststroke} Yuliya Yefimova of Russia originally won the gold medal, but was disqualified in 2014 after testing positive for DHEA.
- ^{Women's 100 m breaststroke} Yuliya Yefimova of Russia originally won the silver medal, but was disqualified in 2014 after testing positive for DHEA.
- ^{Women's 200 m breaststroke} Yuliya Yefimova of Russia originally won the gold medal, but was disqualified in 2014 after testing positive for DHEA.
- ^{Women's 4 × 50 m medley relay} The Russian relay (made up of Daria Ustinova, Yuliya Yefimova, Svetlana Chimrova and Rozaliya Nasretdinova) originally won the gold medal, but was disqualified in 2014 after Yuliya Yefimova tested positive for DHEA.

=== Mixed events ===
Event	Gold		Silver		Bronze	
4 × 50 m mixed freestyle	Russia; Sergey Fesikov; Vladimir Morozov; Rozaliya Nasretdinova; Veronika Popova; Yevgeny Lagunov; Nikita Lobintsev; Mariya Reznikova	1:29.53; WR	Italy; Luca Dotto; Marco Orsi; Silvia Di Pietro; Erika Ferraioli; Federico Bocchia; Giorgia Biondani	1:30.26	Netherlands; Inge Dekker; Joost Reijns; Sebastiaan Verschuren; Ranomi Kromowidjojo; Tamara van Vliet; Maud van der Meer	1:30.62
4 × 50 m mixed medley ^{[g]}	Germany; Christian Diener; Caroline Ruhnau; Steffen Deibler; Dorothea Brandt; Doris Eichhorn; Hendrik Feldwehr	1:39.32	Czech Republic; Simona Baumrtová; Petr Bartůněk; Lucie Svěcená; Tomáš Plevko	1:39.54	Italy; Niccolò Bonacchi; Francesco Di Lecce; Ilaria Bianchi; Erika Ferraioli; Elena Gemo; Silvia Di Pietro; Federico Bocchia	1:39.68

- ^{Mixed 4 × 50 m medley relay} The Russian relay (made up of Vitaly Melnikov, Yuliya Yefimova, Svetlana Chimrova and Vladimir Morozov) originally won the gold medal, but was disqualified after Vitaly Melnikov tested positive for EPO and Yuliya Yefimova tested positive for DHEA.

== Medal table ==
* Host nation (Denmark)

Rank	Nation	Gold	Silver	Bronze	Total
1	Russia	8	4	3	15
2	Hungary	5	3	2	10
3	Denmark*	4	4	1	9
4	Spain	4	0	0	4
5	Lithuania	3	0	0	3
6	Germany	2	5	3	10
6	Sweden	2	5	3	10
8	Italy	2	4	8	14
9	France	2	4	0	6
10	Netherlands	2	1	3	6
11	Ukraine	2	0	2	4
12	Czech Republic	1	3	0	4
13	Poland	1	2	0	3
14	Serbia	1	0	1	2
14	Slovenia	1	0	1	2
16	Great Britain	0	4	5	9
17	Faroe Islands	0	1	0	1
17	Israel	0	1	0	1
19	Belarus	0	0	5	5
20	Belgium	0	0	1	1
20	Ireland	0	0	1	1
20	Portugal	0	0	1	1
Totals (22 entries)		40	41	40	121

On 13 May 2014 Russian swimmer Yuliya Yefimova was officially suspended for doping use and lost 4 gold and 1 silver medals. Another Russian swimmer Vitaly Melnikov was banned in May 2015, which resulted in a loss of an individual silver and two relay gold medals for Russia.

== Participating nations ==
559 swimmers from 42 countries swam at the 2013 edition.

- Austria (12)
- Azerbaijan (0)
- Belarus (13)
- Belgium (17)
- Bosnia and Herzegovina (2)
- Bulgaria (2)
- Croatia (13)
- Cyprus (2)
- Czech Republic (22)
- Denmark (29)
- Estonia (16)
- Faroe Islands (7)
- Finland (19)
- France (44)
- Georgia (0)
- Germany (31)
- Great Britain (12)
- Greece (4)
- Hungary (26)
- Iceland (6)
- Ireland (6)
- Israel (11)
- Italy (34)
- Latvia (3)
- Liechtenstein (2)
- Lithuania (11)
- Luxembourg (8)
- Moldova (1)
- Montenegro (0)
- Netherlands (19)
- Norway (9)
- Poland (15)
- Portugal (8)
- Russia (37)
- Serbia (13)
- Slovakia (10)
- Slovenia (11)
- Spain (12)
- Sweden (33)
- Switzerland (11)
- Turkey (12)
- Ukraine (16)
