= Cody Miller =

American swimmer (born 1992)

Personal information
- Full name: Cody William Miller
- National team: United States
- Born: January 9, 1992 (age 34) Billings, Montana, U.S.
- Height: 1.80 m (5 ft 11 in)
- Weight: 80 kg (176 lb)
- Spouse: Ali DeWitt (m. 2017)

Sport
- Sport: Swimming
- Strokes: Breaststroke, freestyle, individual medley
- Club: DC Trident; Sandpipers of Nevada
- College team: Indiana University
- Coach: Ray Looze
Medal record
Men's swimming
Representing the United States
Event	1st	2nd	3rd
Olympic Games	1	0	1
World Championships (LC)	2	0	0
World Championships (SC)	0	2	1
Pan American Games	0	1	0
Total	3	3	2
Olympic Games
Gold medal – first place	2016 Rio de Janeiro	4×100 m medley
Bronze medal – third place	2016 Rio de Janeiro	100 m breaststroke
World Championships (LC)
Gold medal – first place	2015 Kazan	4×100 m medley
Gold medal – first place	2017 Budapest	4×100 m medley
World Championships (SC)
Silver medal – second place	2014 Doha	4×100 m medley
Silver medal – second place	2016 Windsor	4x50 m medley
Bronze medal – third place	2014 Doha	4×50 m medley
Pan American Games
Silver medal – second place	2019 Lima	100 m breaststroke

Cody William Miller (born January 9, 1992) is an American retired competitive swimmer. He is a former world record holder in both the men's 4×50 meter freestyle relay and the mixed 4×50 meter freestyle relay as well as a former American record holder in the long course 100 meter breaststroke and short course 50 meter, 100 meter, and 200 meter breaststroke events. At the 2016 Summer Olympics, he won a bronze medal in the 100 meter breaststroke and a gold medal in the 4×100 meter medley relay, swimming the breaststroke leg of the relay in the final to help achieve a new Olympic record. In 2019, he won the silver medal in the 100 meter breaststroke at the year's Pan American Games. He competed representing DC Trident in the International Swimming League.

Miller has won a total of seven medals at World Championships and Olympic Games: three gold medals, two silver medals, and two bronze medals, spanning long and short course pool formats.

== Background ==
Cody Miller was born January 9, 1992, in Billings, Montana. He attended Palo Verde High School in Las Vegas, Nevada. Miller then swam at Indiana University under head coach Ray Looze. When Miller qualified for the U.S. Olympic team in 2016, he was the first swimmer from Indiana University to make the U.S. Olympic team in 40 years. Miller has a younger sister, Catie, who swam for Duke University and was also a breaststroke/IM swimmer from 2014 to 2018. Prior to swimming at Indiana University, Miller swam for the Sandpipers of Nevada.

Miller has pectus excavatum, a deformity of the thoracic wall which causes the chest to cave in due to the sternum and rib cage growing abnormally. In Miller's particular case, his deformity is severe enough to cause limitations to his lung capacity. As a result of having the deformity, he started swimming at age eight "to monitor [his] heart and breathing". Miller opted not to have surgery to correct the deformity, and swimming helped broaden his chest and develop his rib cage.

Miller is a self professed film-buff. He is also recognized through his YouTube channel which he set up in 2016, and has gained in popularity since. He creates content based on his personal life and swimming career. As of June 2022, the channel had grown to over 172,000 subscribers and videos uploaded to the channel had received over 30,000,000 views.

== Swimming career ==
=== 2008–2015 ===
At the 2008 US Olympic Trials in Omaha, Nebraska, Miller placed 76th in the 200 meter individual medley with a time of 2:08.43. The following Olympic Trials, the 2012 US Olympic Trials, Miller placed highest in the 200 meter individual medley where he swam a 2:00.90 to place seventh in the final, finishing 1.03 seconds behind fifth-place finisher Chase Kalisz, as well as placing 14th in the 200 meter breaststroke with a 2:13.43 and 44th in the 100 meter breaststroke with a 1:03.36.

Miller rose to prominence in the world swimming scene at the 2014 Short Course World Championships in Doha, Qatar, where he took home a pair of medals, a silver in the men's 4×100 meter medley relay (3:21.49) and a bronze in the 4×50 m medley relay (an American-record time of 1:31.83).

At the 2014 U.S. nationals, Cody Miller won the 100 breast and claimed his first national title. This win gained him popularity and earned him a sponsorship from the swimwear company TYR. He was sponsored by TYR from 2014 to 2021.

At the 2015 World Aquatics Championships in Kazan, Russia, Miller claimed his first gold medal as part of the U.S. team in the 4×100 meter medley relay. Swimming the breaststroke leg, Miller recorded a split of 59.23 seconds in the prelims to put the Americans at the top of the final field with a time of 3:31.06. Miller also competed in the 100 m breaststroke, but failed to advance to the final, finishing in ninth at 59.86 seconds.

=== 2016–2021 ===
Miller placed second at the 2016 United States Olympic Trials in the 100 meter breaststroke with a time of 59.26 seconds in the final, finishing 0.08 seconds behind first-place finisher Kevin Cordes.

At the 2016 Summer Olympics, Miller won a bronze medal in the men's 100 metre breaststroke, setting the Americas record and American record for the men's 100 metre breaststroke with a time of 58.87 seconds. His time broke the former records of 58.94 seconds set by Kevin Cordes at the 2016 US Olympic Trials. Miller also won a gold medal in the men's 4 × 100 metre medley relay, in which he split a 59.03 for the breaststroke leg of the relay in the final to help win in an Olympic record time of 3:27.95 with finals relay teammates Ryan Murphy (backstroke), Michael Phelps (butterfly), and Nathan Adrian (freestyle).

At the 2019 Pan American Games in Lima, Peru, Miller won the silver medal in the 100 meter breaststroke with a time of 59.57 seconds, finishing 0.06 seconds behind gold medalist João Gomes Júnior of Brazil and 0.70 seconds ahead of bronze medalist Kevin Cordes.

In preparation for the 2020 U.S Olympic Trials, with the primary meet set to be held from June 13–20, Miller signed with Speedo after being with TYR for over 6 years. He did not qualify for the games.

== International championships ==
Meet	50 breaststroke	100 breaststroke	200 breaststroke	4×50 medley relay	4×100 medley relay	4×50 mixed medley relay	4×100 mixed medley relay
PAC 2014	—N/a	1st (b)	3rd (b)	—N/a		—N/a	—N/a
SCW 2014	9th	8th	9th	3rd place, bronze medalist(s)	2nd place, silver medalist(s)	4th	—N/a
WC 2015		9th		—N/a	(gold) ^{[a]}	—N/a	
OG 2016	—N/a	3rd place, bronze medalist(s)		—N/a	1st place, gold medalist(s)	—N/a	—N/a
SCW 2016	7th	6th		2nd place, silver medalist(s)	DSQ	(gold) ^{[a]}	—N/a
WC 2017	16th	5th		—N/a	(gold) ^{[a]}	—N/a	
PAN 2019	—N/a	2nd place, silver medalist(s)		—N/a		—N/a	DSQ

^{a} Miller swam only in the prelims heats.

== Career best times ==
=== Long course meters (50 m pool) ===
Event	Time		Meet	Location	Date	Notes	Ref
50 m breaststroke	26.55		Enhanced Games	Las Vegas, Nevada	May 24, 2026		
100 m breaststroke	58.87		2016 Summer Olympics	Rio de Janeiro, Brazil	August 7, 2016	Former AM, NR	
200 m breaststroke	2:08.98		TYR Pro Swim Series – Bloomington	Bloomington, Indiana	May 19, 2019		
200 m individual medley	2:00.66	b	2013 US Open Swimming Championships	Irvine, California	August 3, 2013		

Legend: b — b-final

=== Short course meters (25 m pool) ===
Event	Time	Meet	Location	Date	Notes	Ref
50 m breaststroke	26.15	2016 World Short Course Championships	Windsor, Canada	December 10, 2016	Former NR	
100 m breaststroke	56.43	2015 Duel in the Pool	Indianapolis	December 12, 2015	Former NR, US	
200 m breaststroke	2:02.33	2015 Duel in the Pool	Indianapolis	December 11, 2015	Former AM, NR, US	

=== Short course yards (25 yd pool) ===
Event	Time	Meet	Location	Date	Ref
100 yd breaststroke	50.82	2015 Oklahoma Elite Pro-Am Meet	Oklahoma City	December 18, 2015	
200 yd breaststroke	1:49.31	2017 US Winter National Championships	Columbus, Ohio	December 2, 2017	

== World records ==
=== Short course meters (25 m pool) ===
No.	Event	Time	Meet	Date	Location	Ref
1	4x50 m mixed medley^{[a]}	1:49.87	Indiana University Fall Frenzy	September 26, 2013	Bloomington, Indiana	
2	4x50 m mixed freestyle^{[b]}	1:41.16	Indiana University Fall Frenzy	September 26, 2013	Bloomington, Indiana	
3	4x50 m freestyle^{[c]}	1:36.81	Indiana University Fall Frenzy	September 26, 2013	Bloomington, Indiana	

^{a} Miller swam the breaststroke leg; with James Wells (backstroke), Gia Dalesandro (butterfly), and Olivia Barker (freestyle).
^{b} Miller swam the 4th leg; with Bailey Pressey (1st leg), Stephanie Armstrong (2nd leg), and Tanner Kurz (3rd leg).
^{c} Miller swam the 1st leg; with James Wells (2nd leg), Matt Gerth (3rd leg), and Philip Butler (4th leg).

== Olympic records ==
No.	Event	Time	Meet	Date	Location	Ref
1	4×100 m medley relay^{[a]}	3:27.95	2016 Summer Olympics	August 13, 2016	Rio de Janeiro, Brazil	

^{a} Miller split a 59.03 for the breaststroke leg; with Ryan Murphy (backstroke), Michael Phelps (butterfly), and Nathan Adrian (freestyle).

== Continental and national records ==
=== Long course meters (50 m pool) ===
No.	Event	Time	Meet	Location	Date	Type	Status	Ref
1	100 m breaststroke	58.87	2016 Summer Olympics	Rio de Janeiro, Brazil	August 7, 2016	AM, NR	Former	

Legend: AM – Americas record; NR – American record;
Records not set in finals: h – heat; sf – semifinal; r – relay 1st leg; rh – relay heat 1st leg; b – B final; † – en route to final mark; so – swim-off; tt – time trial

=== Short course meters (25 m pool) ===
No.	Event	Time	Meet	Location	Date	Type	Status	Ref
1	200 m breaststroke	2:02.33	2015 Duel in the Pool	Indianapolis	December 11, 2015	AM, NR, US	Former	
2	100 m breaststroke	56.43	2015 Duel in the Pool	Indianapolis	December 12, 2015	NR, US	Former	
3	50 m breaststroke	26.15	2016 World Short Course Championships	Windsor, Canada	December 10, 2016	NR	Former	

Legend: AM – Americas record; NR – American record; US – U.S. Open record;
Records not set in finals: h – heat; sf – semifinal; r – relay 1st leg; rh – relay heat 1st leg; b – B final; † – en route to final mark; so – swim-off; tt – time trial

== Personal life ==
Cody Miller became engaged to Ali DeWitt on November 22, 2015, at the Golden Goggle Awards. Miller married his fiancée Ali DeWitt on September 9, 2017. On June 21, 2020, Miller revealed in a video on his YouTube channel that he and his wife Ali were expecting their first child. Their son, Axel Zeke Miller, was born on November 16, 2020. They welcomed their second son Kato William Miller on February 2, 2022.

== See also ==
- World record progression 4 × 50 metres medley relay
- World record progression 4 × 50 metres freestyle relay
- World and Olympic records set at the 2016 Summer Olympics
- List of Pan American Games medalists in swimming

Records
Preceded by New record	Men's 4 × 50 metres freestyle relay world record-holder September 26, 2013 – December 15, 2013; With: James Wells, Matt Gerth, Philip Butler	Succeeded by François Heersbrandt, Yoris Grandjean, Pieter Timmers, Jasper Aerents
Preceded by New record	Mixed 4 × 50 metres freestyle relay world record-holder September 26, 2013 – October 13, 2013; With: Bailey Pressey, Stephanie Armstrong, Tanner Kurz	Succeeded by Rozaliya Nasretdinova, Dmitry Ermakov, Artem Lobuzov, Maria Reznikova
Preceded by New record	Mixed 4 × 50 metres medley relay world record-holder September 26, 2013 – September 28, 2013; With: James Wells, Gia Dalesandro, Olivia Barker	Succeeded by Dustin Rhoads, Andrew Marciniak, Haley Gordon, Olivia Kabacinski
