= Ray Looze =

American swimming coach (born 1967)

Personal information
- Born: May 12, 1967 (age 59) San Francisco Bay Area, U.S.

Sport
- Sport: Swimming
- Strokes: Medley
- College team: USC Trojans
Medal record
Representing United States
Pan American Games
Bronze medal – third place	1991 Havana	200m individual medley

Ray Looze (born May 12, 1967, in the San Francisco Bay Area), is an American swimming coach.

== Education ==
Looze graduated from the University of Southern California with a bachelor's degree in business finance, then from the University of Texas at Austin's School of Education with a master's degree, where he was a graduate assistant coach.

He is a 1986 graduate of Junipero Serra High School in San Mateo, CA, where as of 2022 he holds the longest-standing varsity swimming record, which he set in 1986 for the 200yard individual medley (200 IM) with a time of 1:50.97.

== Swimming career ==
Looze is also a former national-team swimmer for the USA. He earned a bronze medal in the 200m IM at the 1991 Pan American Games, and swam for USC Trojans in college, from 1986 to 1990.

== Coaching career ==
Looze began his coaching career after finishing 3rd at his last Olympic trials.

=== Early career ===
In 1991, he started coaching as a men's swimming graduate assistant at the University of Texas at Austin where he helped the Longhorns win the NCAA title. From 1992 to 1993, he was the assistant men's swimming coach at Harvard. He had his first head coaching job at the Peddie School from 1994 to 1995, where he led the prep school to a national championship in 1995. During 1995–96, he coached the Phoenix (Arizona) Swim Club. From 1997 to 2002, Looze was the head coach at the University of the Pacific (UOP) initially helming the men's program, but quickly added the women's program to his portfolio in 1998. He led both teams to Big West Conference championships in 2002–03. He also coached the club team Tiger Aquatics in Stockton, Calif., during his time at UOP.

=== Career at Indiana University ===
Since June 2002, Looze has been the head coach for the Indiana Hoosiers, where he runs both the men's and women's swimming programs.

In 2016 Looze was a Women's Assistant Coach for the 2016 USA Olympic Swimming Team. He also served as a coach for the USA team to the 2014 Short Course Worlds. At the 2016 Olympic Swimming Trials, Looze coached Cody Miller, Blake Pieroni, and Lilly King who all qualified for the team.

== Awards and recognition ==
In 2016, he was named Big 10 Coach of the Year, an honor he has received in ten other years as well. In 2018, he was named CSCAA National Swimming Coach of the Year.

== Personal life ==
Looze is married to Kandis Looze (née Perry, born May 10, 1966). They have one daughter and one son. His daughter, MacKenzie, was born in Stockon, CA on January 13, 2000. She swam for Coach Looze at Indiana and his son, Bryce, born on July 30, 1998, attended Wabash College in Crawfordsville, IN. Mackenzie was also coached in high school by her mother who is one of the top swimming coaches in the country. Looze met Kandis at the Olympic Training Center, where they both had swimmers on the national team, and married five-and-a-half months later.
