= Vitaly Melnikov (swimmer) =

Russian swimmer

Personal information
- Born: 20 March 1990 (age 36) Voronezh, Russia

Sport
- Sport: Swimming
Medal record
Representing Russia
European Championships (SC)
Disqualified	2013 Herning	4×50 m men's medley
Disqualified	2013 Herning	4×50 m mixed medley
Disqualified	2013 Herning	100 m backstroke

Vitaly Viktorovich Melnikov (Russian: Виталий Викторович Мельников; born 20 March 1990) is a Russian backstroke swimmer.

== Career ==
At the 2013 European Short Course Swimming Championships, he won an individual silver medal in the 100 m backstroke and two medley relay gold medals, in the men's and mixed competitions, breaking world records in both medley events. Those results were annulled after a positive doping test of his samples taken during those European Championships. Melnikov was suspended from competitions in April 2014, and banned in March 2015 until 12 December 2015.
