= Tamara van Vliet =

Dutch swimmer

Personal information
- Nationality: Dutch
- Born: 31 December 1994 (age 31)

Sport
- Sport: Swimming
Medal record
European Championships (SC)
Gold medal – first place	2017 Copenhagen	4×50 m freestyle
Gold medal – first place	2019 Glasgow	4×50 m freestyle

Tamara van Vliet (born 31 December 1994) is a Dutch swimmer. She competed in the women's 50 metre freestyle event at the 2017 World Aquatics Championships.
