= Dmitri Yermakov =

Russian photographer

Dmitri Ivanovich Yermakov
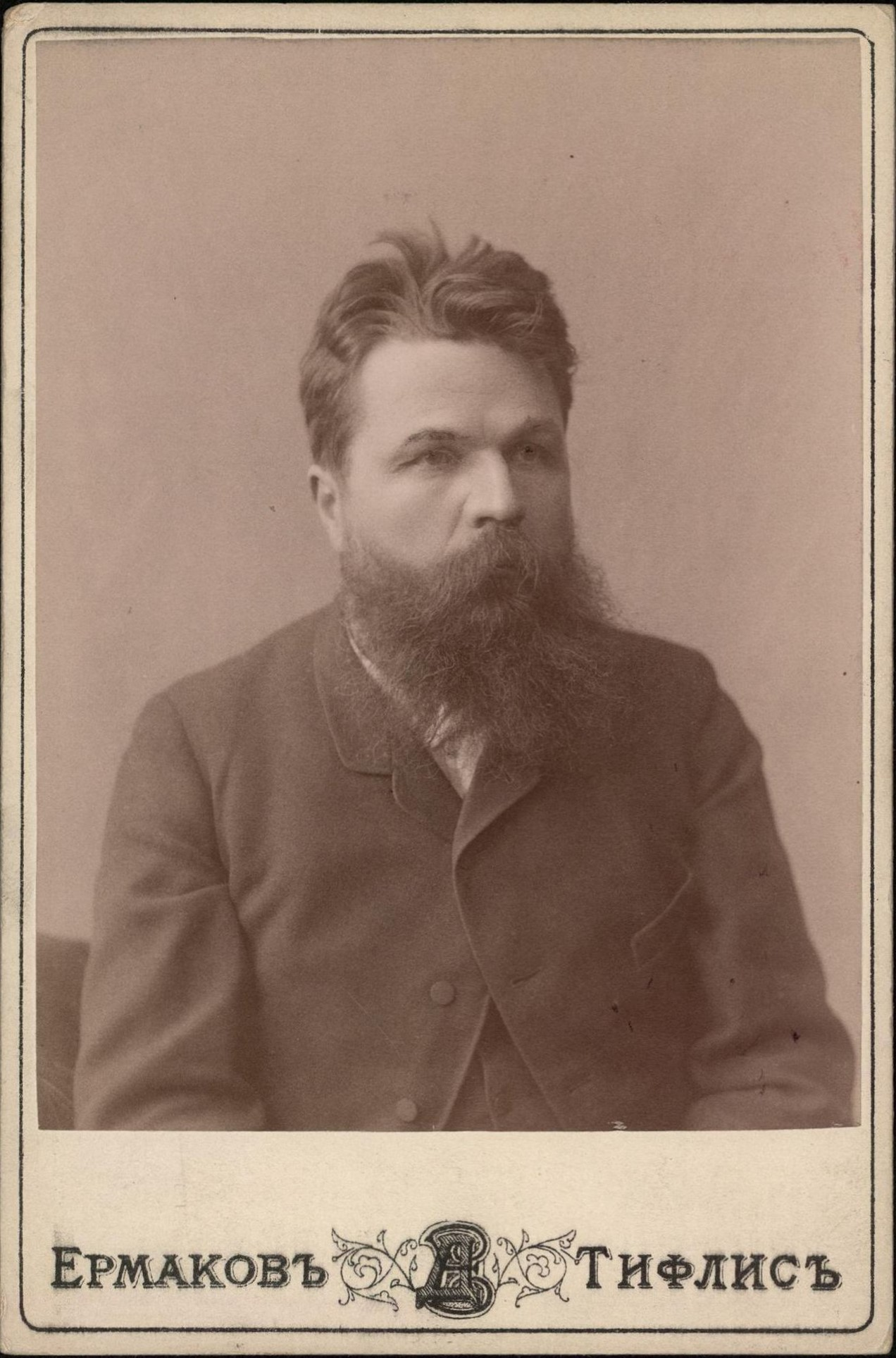
- Self-portrait
- Born: 1845 / 1846; Tiflis, Russian Empire
- Died: 10 November 1916 (aged 69–70)
- Known for: Photographer
- Movement: Orientalist

Dmitri Ivanovich Yermakov (Russian: Дмитрий Иванович Ермаков) (1845 / 1846 – 10 November 1916) was a Russian photographer known for his series of the Caucasian photographs.

== Life and career ==
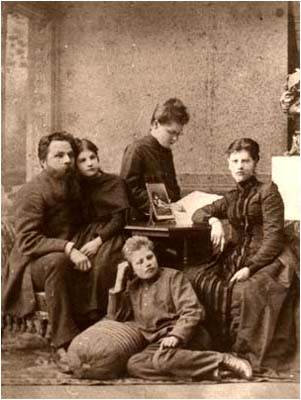
Dmitri Yermakov and family, 1896

Yermakov was born in 1846 in the Caucasus; sources variously give his birthplace as Nakhchivan (present-day Azerbaijan) or Tiflis (present-day Tbilisi, Georgia). His father was the Italian architect Luigi Cambiagio who moved to Tiflis from Odessa, his mother was from a German-speaking community in Tiflis. She remarried the Russian Yermakov whose surname Dmitry took. In the early 1860s Yermakov completed a one-year course at the Military Topographic Depot attached to the headquarters of the Separate Caucasus Corps, where he trained in topographic surveying and printing.

Yermakov married Anna Bihold. They have three children: two sons, Ivan, who became a psychiatrist, and Alexander, who also became a photographer, and a daughter, Ludmila.

In the late 1860s Yermakov partnered with the painter Pyotr Kolchin (1838–1890s) and opened his first portrait photostudio in Tiflis. Around 1870 he opened his own studio, where he began systematically photographing various ethnic groups of the Caucasus.

In 1871 Yermakov sent a collection of photographs to Paris and was admitted to the French Photographic Society. In 1872 he joined a lengthy archaeological expedition across Asian and European Turkey, photographing architectural monuments and landscapes as far as Varna. In the early 1870s he submitted a collection of views of Turkish Armenia to the Russian Geographical Society.

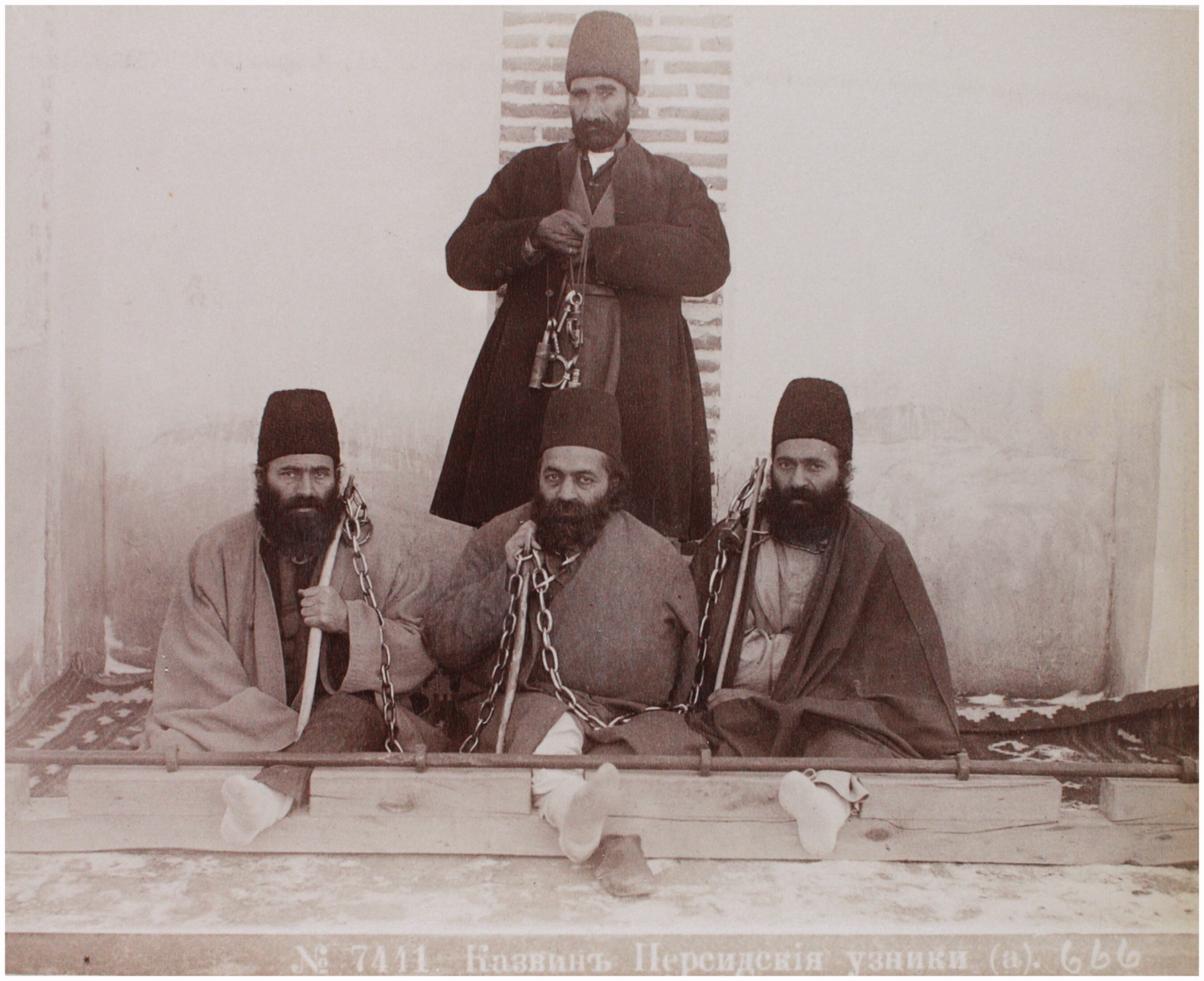
"The prisoners Mirza Faraj-Allah Khan, Mirza Mohammad-Ali Khan and Mirza Nasr-Allah Khan ... in front of the governor’s residence, all chained with their feet fixed in a wooden plank ... the guard, Nayeb Reza Qoli, towers above them in the centre and holds the iron chains"

After returning from Turkey, Yermakov met the young photographer Antoin Sevruguin in Tiflis. Their shared interest in Eastern culture led Yermakov to travel to Persia, likely at Sevruguin's invitation. During this trip he covered roughly 1,100 km and produced over 850 glass negatives documenting the culture of southern Azerbaijan and northern Persia. In Tehran he presented his work to Shah Naser al-Din Qajar, who subsequently appointed him court photographer and awarded him the Order of the Lion and Sun, 2nd class. By request of the Shah, Yermakov photographed all inmates of the Qazmin prison. Yermakov was fluent in French and Persian, and taught photography in the Royal School Photography Studio in Tehran in 1870s. As a court photographer, he was allowed to take photos of shah's harem women, including Anis al-Dawla. Yermakov also trained Sevruguin, first in Tiflis and then in Tehran.

In 1874, at the age of 28, Yermakov won a medal at the tenth jubilee exhibition of the French Photographic Society for 17 wet-collodion views of the Turkish city of Amasya.

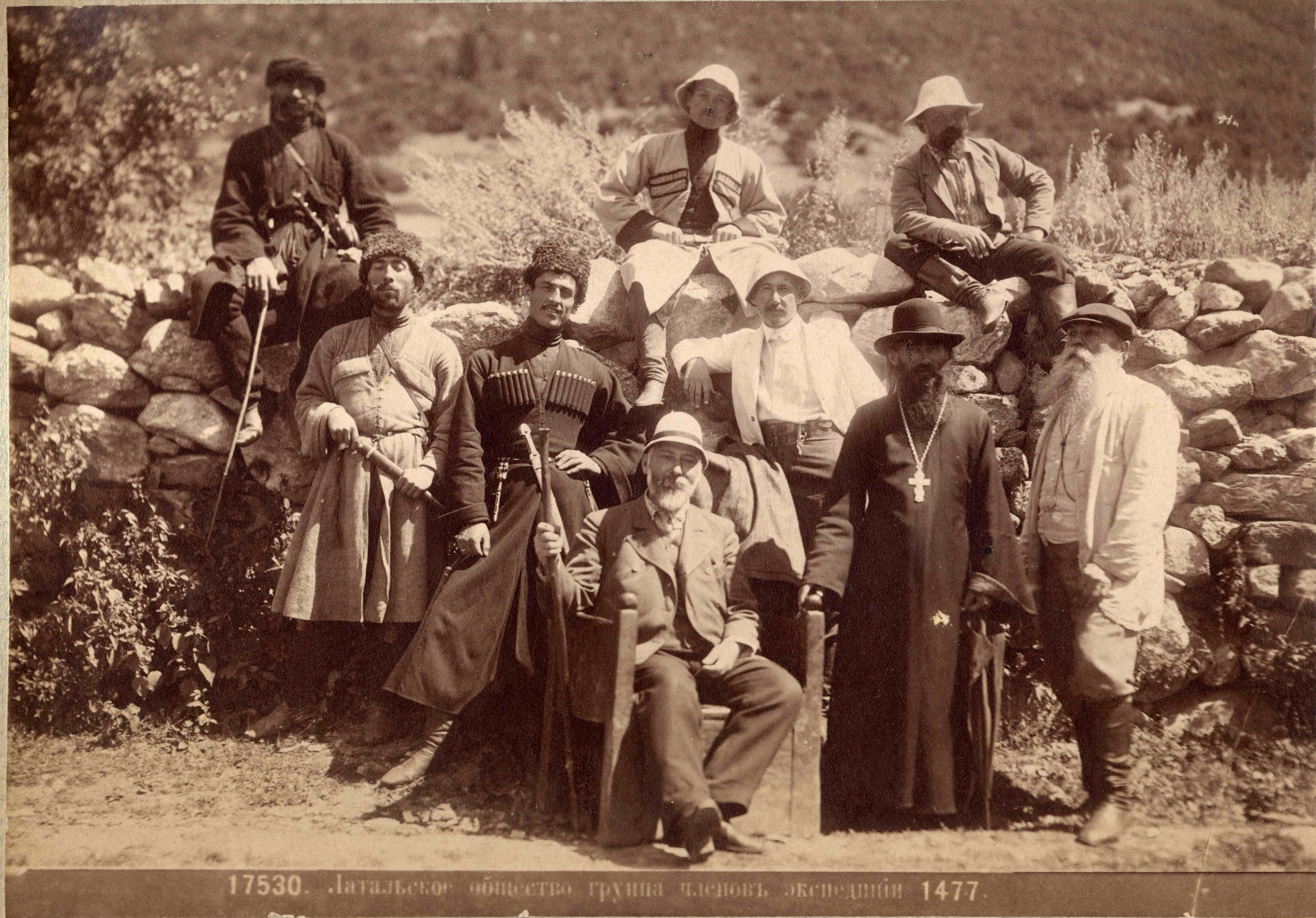
Yermakov with members of an ethnographic expedition, 1910

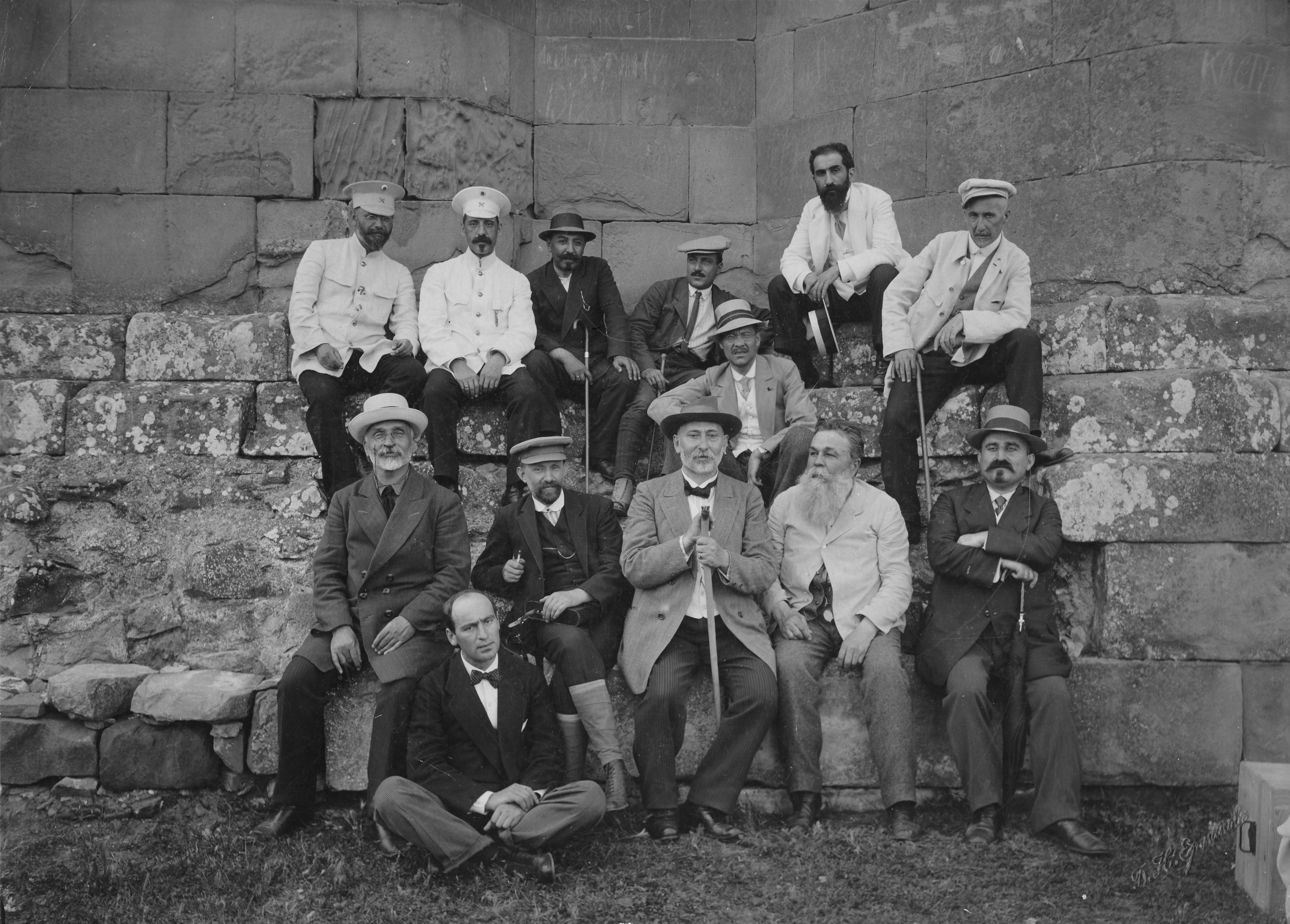
Research expedition to the Cross church, Yermakov is in the first row, second from right (1914)

At the invitation of Countess Praskovya Uvarova, president of the Moscow Archaeological Society, Yermakov participated in archaeological excavations in the Caucasus, recording finds from ancient burial sites and objects in private collections. Simultaneously he expanded his gallery of ethnic portraits, depicting subjects in traditional dress, during rituals, at work, and in domestic settings.

From 1877 to 1878 Yermakov served as a military photographer on the Caucasian front during the Russo-Turkish War, producing images for the General Staff. He was attached to units in the area of the 41st Infantry Division.

In the 1880s and 1890s Yermakov documented the agricultural and industrial development of the Caucasus. He worked for the Caucasian Railway, photographed official visits of dignitaries, and made extensive views of the resort towns of the Caucasus Mineral Waters region. A catalogue of his work published in Tiflis in 1896 (expanded edition 1901) listed some 18,000 items.

His final expedition took place in 1910, when he accompanied the archaeologist Ekvtime Takaishvili to Lechkhumi-Svaneti, producing approximately 900 glass negatives.

Ermakov died in 1916 in Tiflis. In 1903 he had sold a collection of 500 prints to the ethnographic department of the Alexander III Museum (now the Russian Ethnographic Museum) in Saint Petersburg, where they and his correspondence remain. His photographs are held by institutions in Georgia, France, Italy, Germany, the United States, the United Kingdom, and Russia (Moscow, Saint Petersburg, Krasnodar), as well as private collections worldwide.

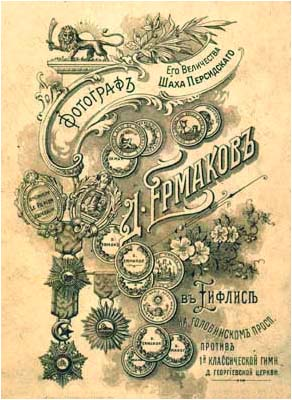
Yermakov's photographic stamp, Tiflis

Yermakov captioned every photo and organized them by theme and location. The National Museum of Georgia in Tbilisi have the largest collection of Yermakov's photos: "more than 20,000 original prints, approximately 16,000 glass negatives, 13,000 stereo photo cards, and over 100 photo albums and cameras". The collection was restored at the Nederlands Fotomuseum in 1999-2010.

== Awards and honors ==
Yermakov was elected to the Russian Archaeological Society in 1881. He became a member of the Society for the Encouragement of Fine Arts in Tiflis around 1897, and in 1907 was listed among members of the Caucasian division of the Moscow Archaeological Society. He received awards at the 1878 Paris World Exhibition, the 1879 Moscow Anthropological Exhibition, and the 1882 All-Russian Industrial and Art Exhibition in Moscow.

== Works ==
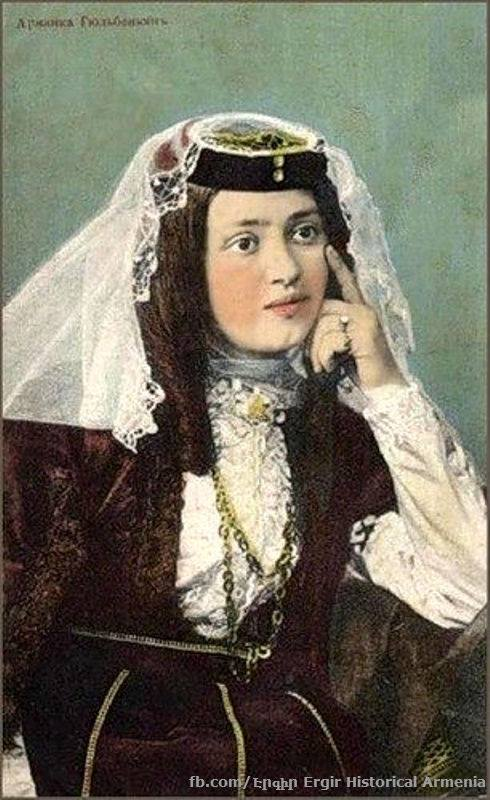
Armenian noble woman from Tiflis, date unknown

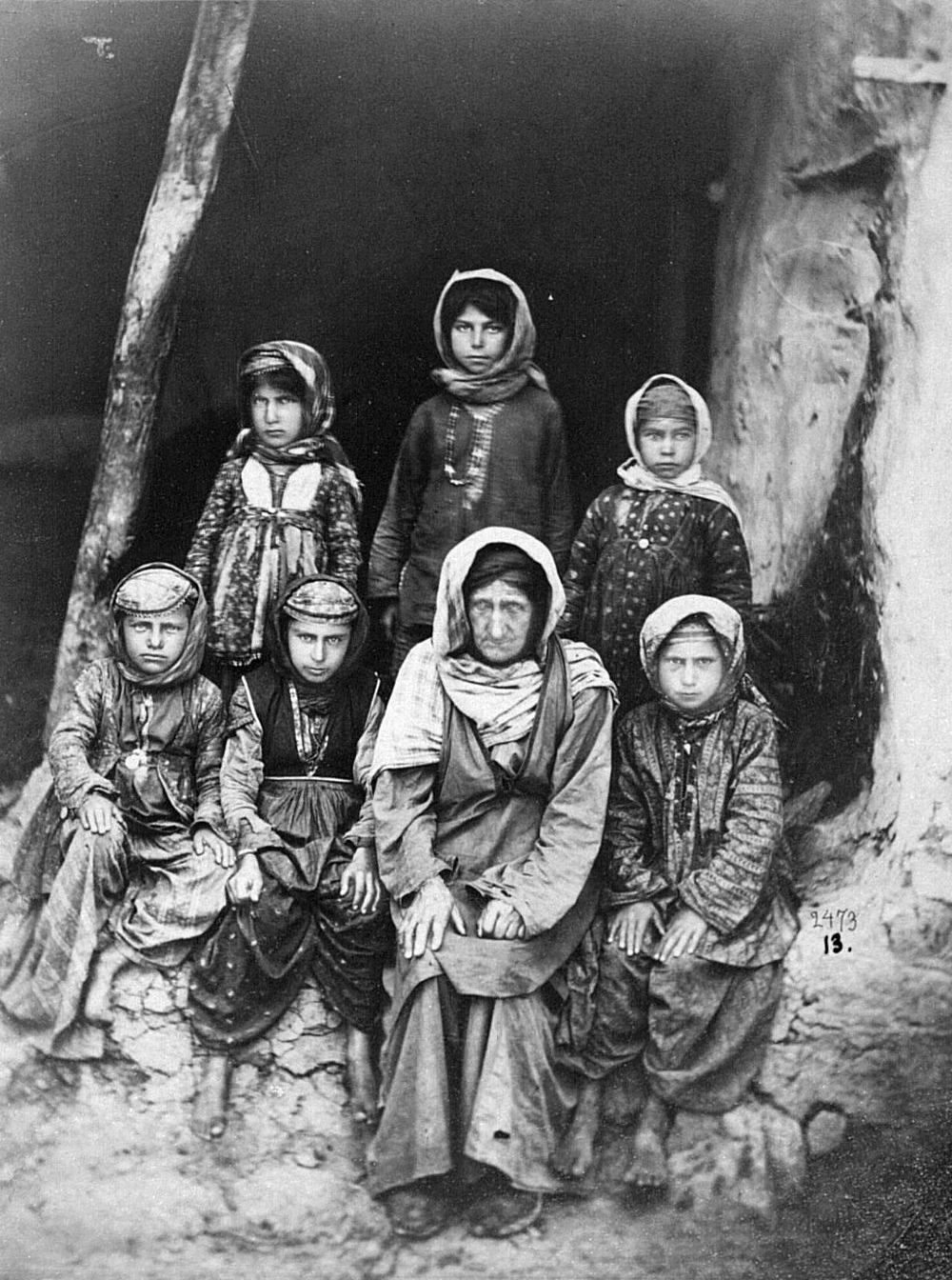
Girls and Aged Woman Djeg Settlement, 1880

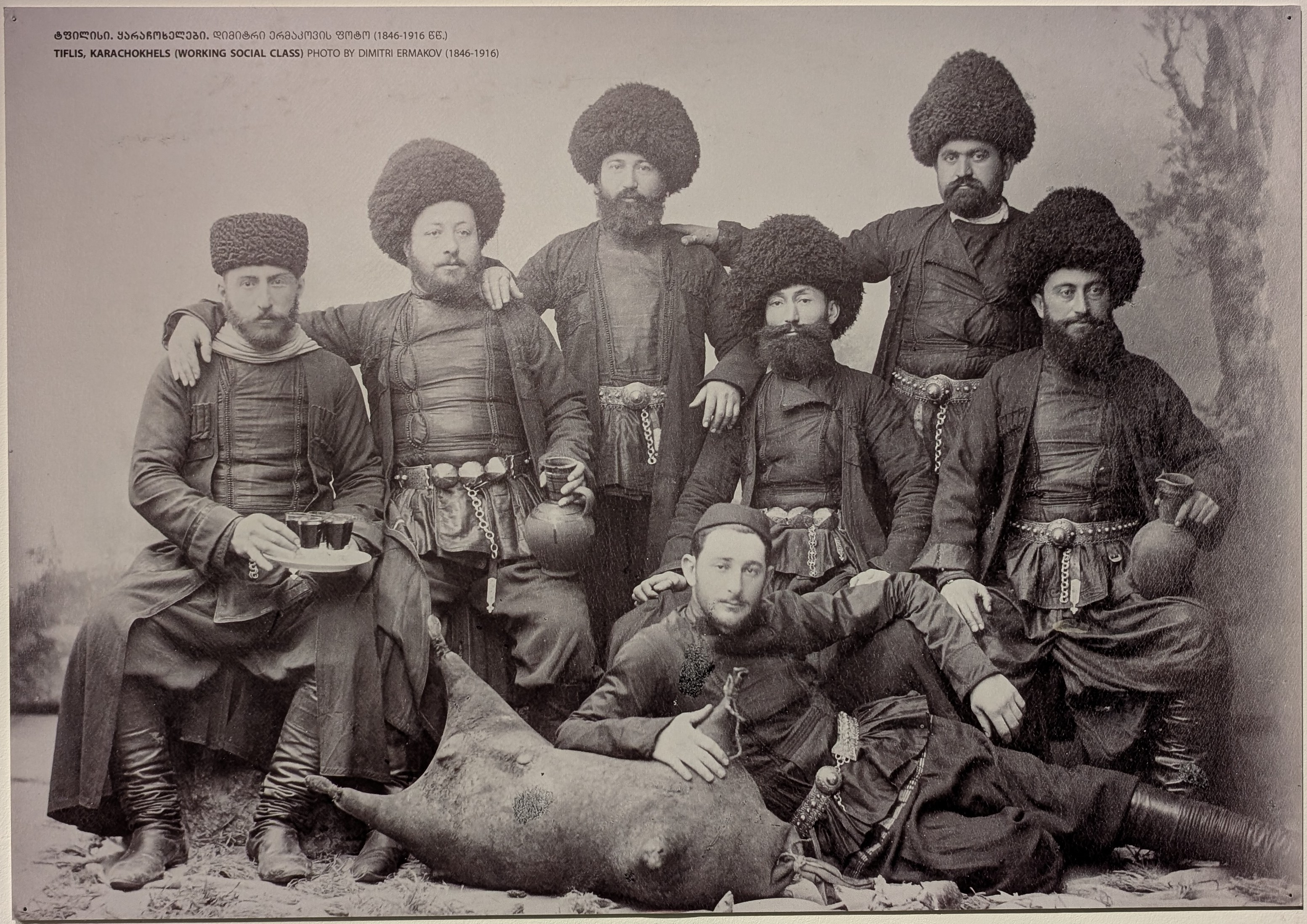
Tiflis, Karachokhels (working social class)

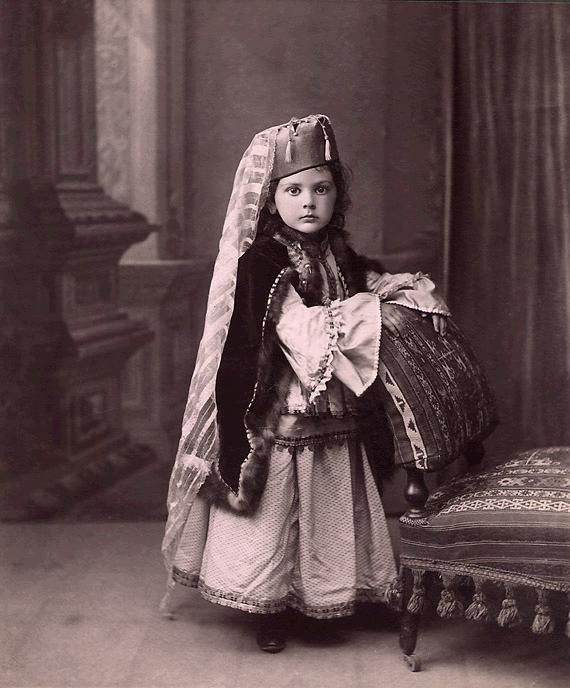
Princess Lazarev in Tatar costume, date unknown

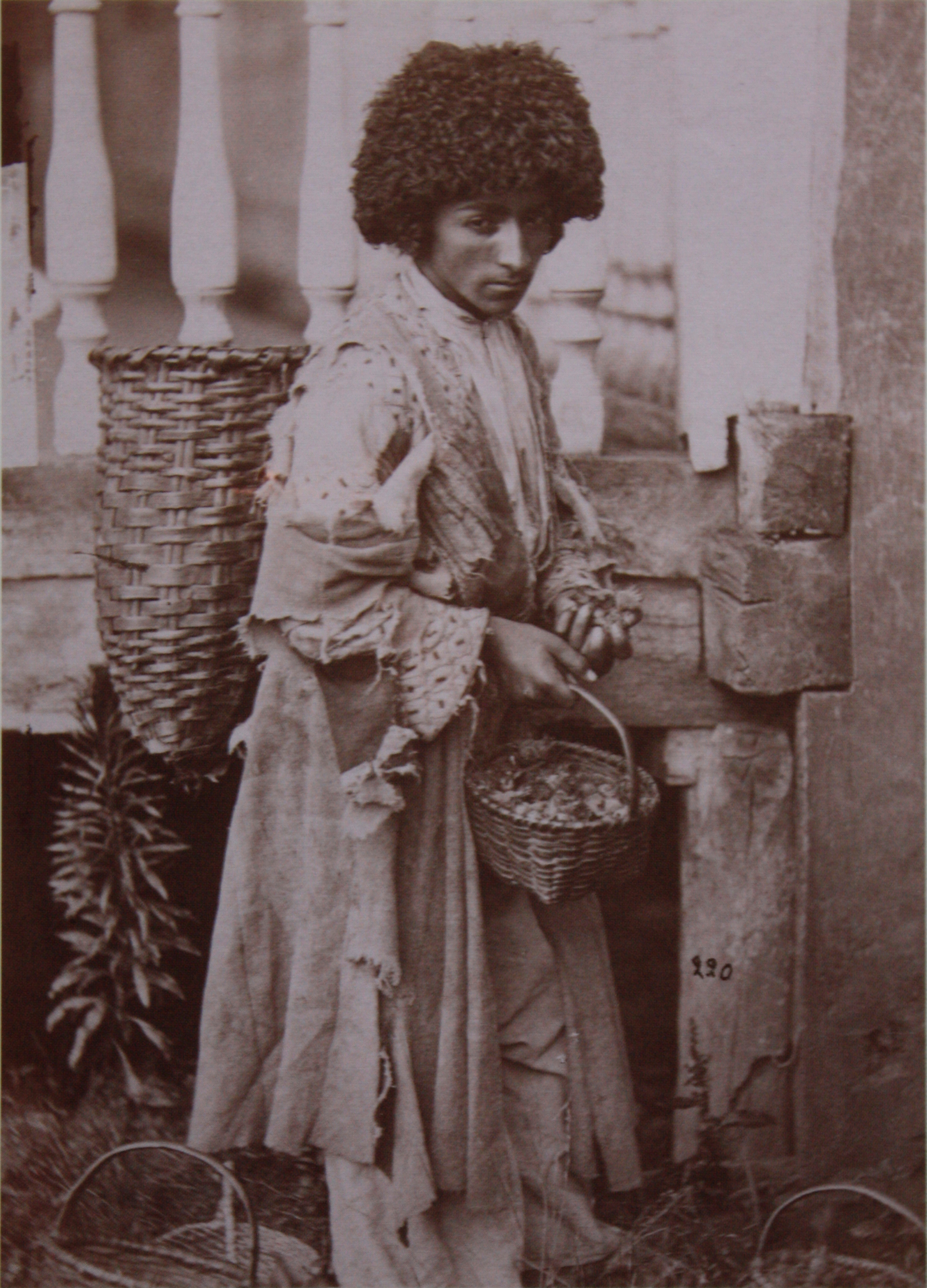
A Jew with nuts, date unknown

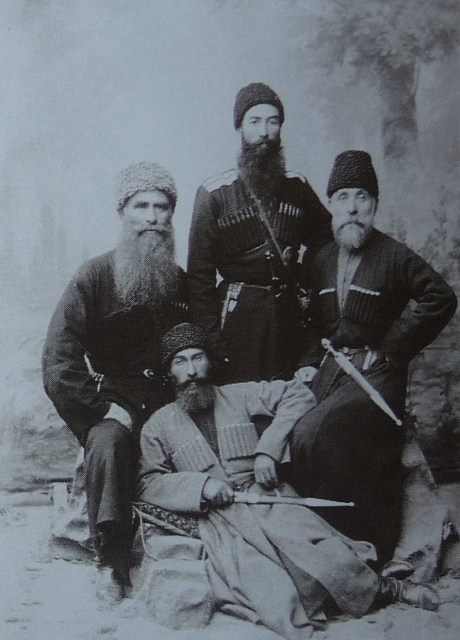
Georgians with national clothes, date unknown

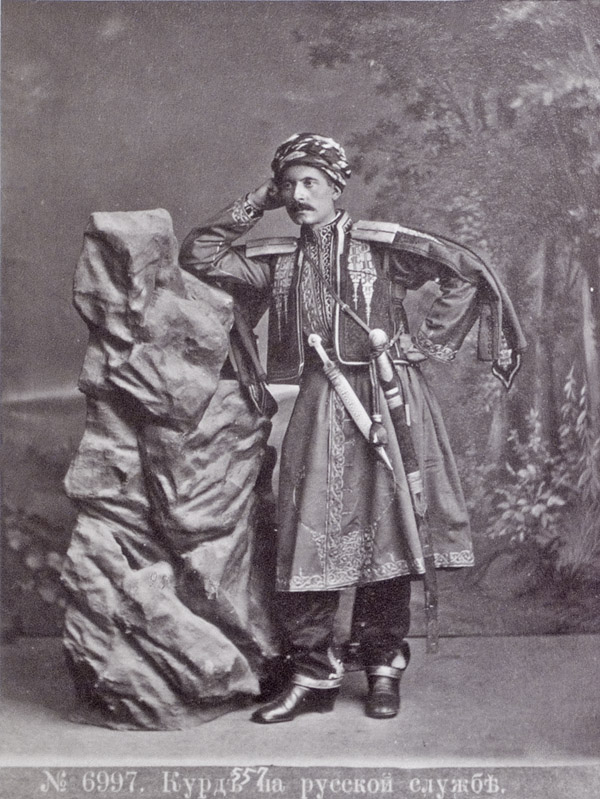
Kurd in the Russian service,

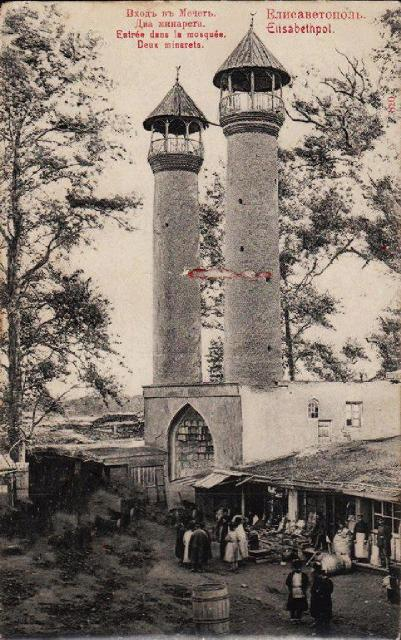
Shah Abbas mosque in Ganja, early 1900s

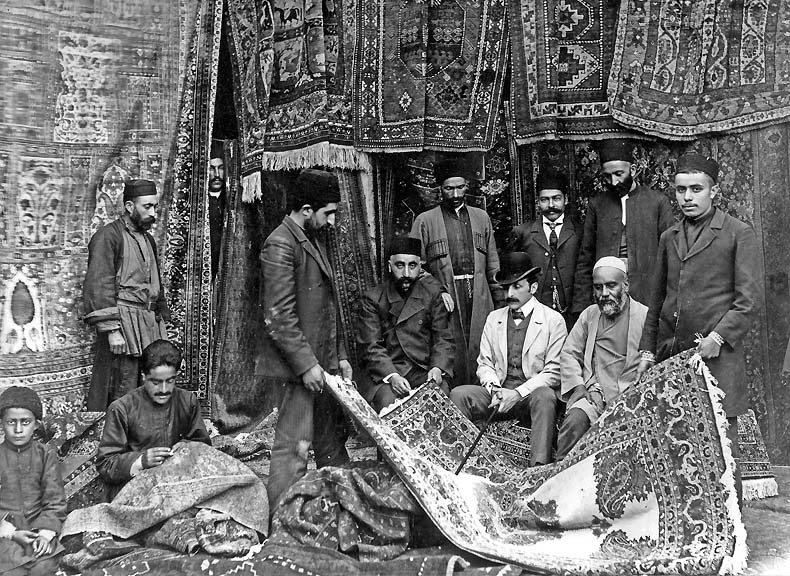
Rug Deal at the Tiflis Bazaar, date unknown

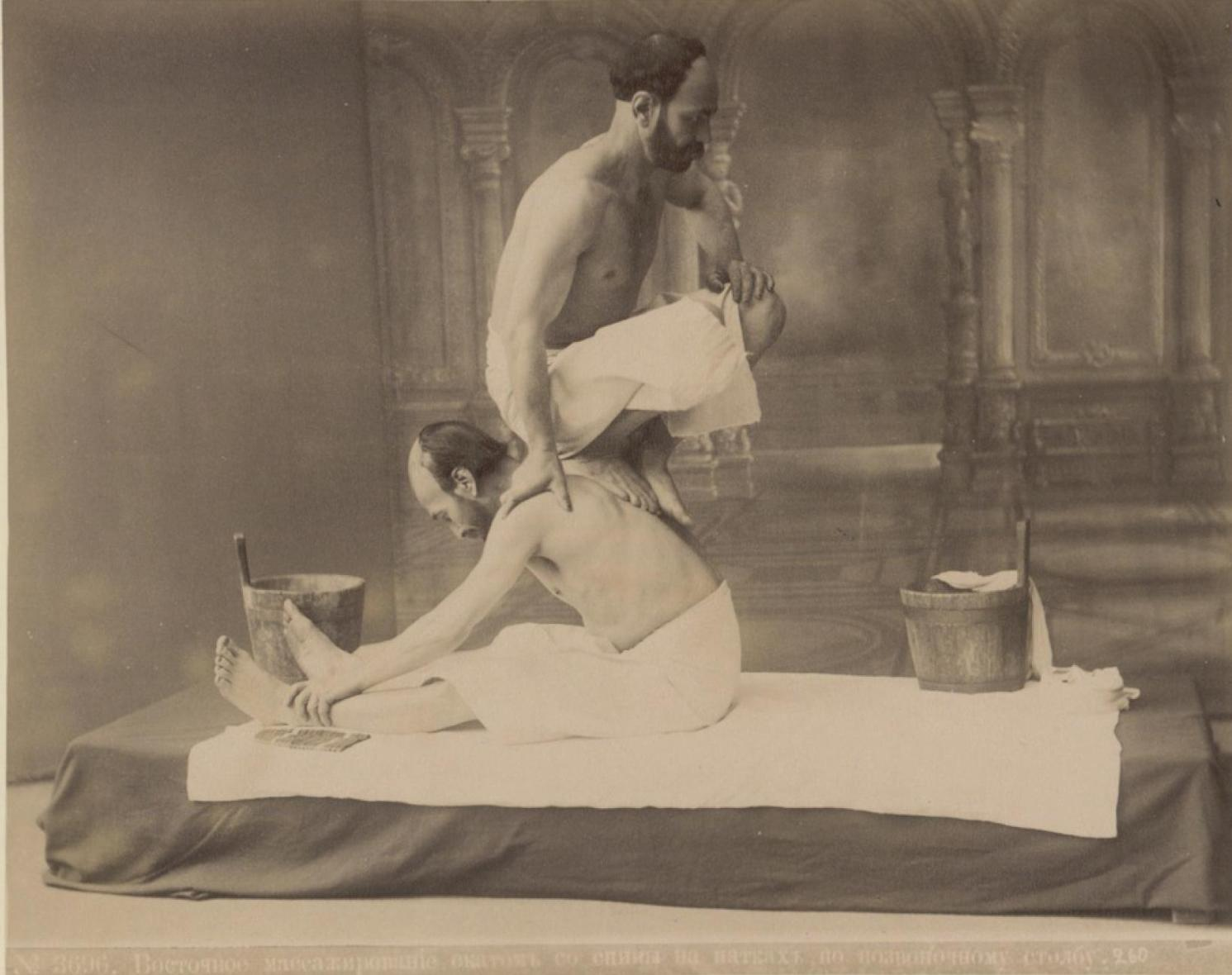
The Oriental Bath, 1880

== Bibliography ==
- Hannavy, John (2008). Encyclopedia of Nineteenth-century Photography. CRC Press. pp. 494–5. ISBN 0-415-97235-3.
- Dadashov, Emin (2016). "Photographs of Dmitry Ermakov as a source of study of societal groups of the XIX and early XX centuries in Azerbaijan (based on materials of National Azerbaijan History Museum)".
- Dimitri Ermakov In Iran. 2019. ISBN 9789941817564.
- Azerbaijan in Photos by Dmitri Yermakov. Baku. 2020.

== See also ==
- List of Orientalist artists
- List of artistic works with Orientalist influences
- Orientalism
