= Sayaka Akase =

Japanese swimmer (born 1994)

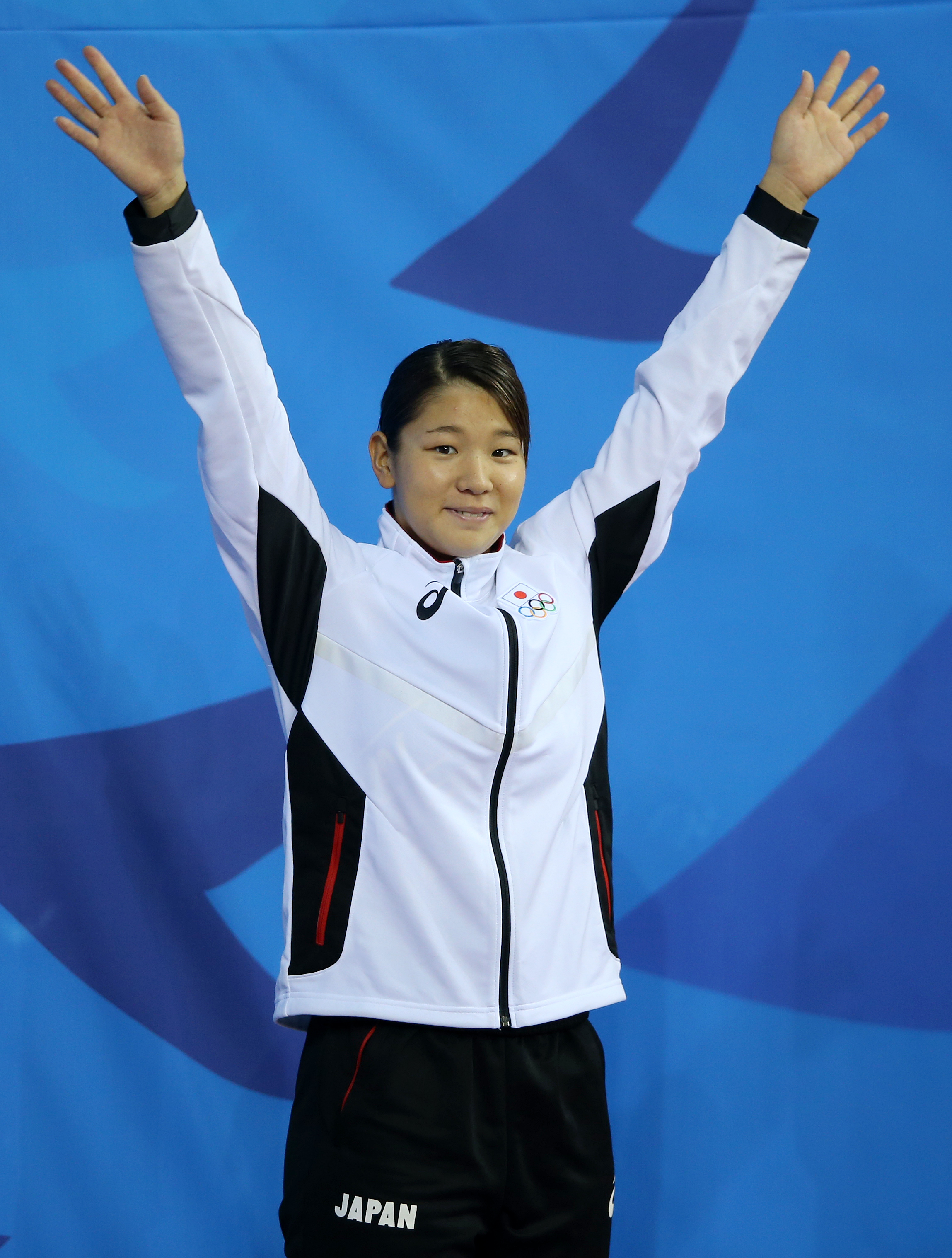
- Photo of Sayaka Akase at Incheon Asian Games

Personal information
- Full name: Sayaka Akase
- National team: Japan
- Born: August 25, 1994 (age 31)
- Height: 1.65 m (5 ft 5 in)
- Weight: 56 kg (123 lb)

Sport
- Sport: Swimming
- Strokes: Backstroke
Medal record
Women's swimming
Representing Japan
Asian Games
Gold medal – first place	2014 Incheon	200m backstroke
FINA World Swimming Championships (25 m)
Bronze medal – third place	2014 Doha	200m backstroke
Bronze medal – third place	2014 Doha	4x100m individual medley

Sayaka Akase (赤瀬 紗也香, Akase Sayaka; born August 25, 1994) is a Japanese competitive swimmer who specializes in backstroke. She won the gold medal in the 200 meter backstroke at the 2014 Asian Games. She also won the bronze medal in the 200 meter backstroke and the 4x100 meter relay at the 2014 FINA Short-Course Swimming Championships. She has also competed in the 2013 and 2015 World Aquatics Championships, and the 2014 Pan Pacific Swimming Championships. She has produced a total of 3 international medals, with 1 gold and 2 bronze.

== Swimming career ==
=== 2013 ===
Akase made her international debut at the 2013 World Aquatics Championships in Barcelona. She competed in the 200 meter backstroke, and was eliminated in the semifinals. She finished 13th overall. She also competed in the 100 meter backstroke, and was eliminated in the preliminary round. She finished 28th overall.

=== 2014 ===
==== Pan Pacific Games ====
In 2014, Akase competed at the 2014 Pan Pacific Swimming Championships. She competed in the 100 meter backstroke and finished 11th in the preliminary round. She also swam in the 200 meter backstroke. She finished 10th out of 21 swimmers. She competed in the 50 meter freestyle and the 200m IM and 32nd a 24th in those races, and was eliminated in the heats.

==== 2014 Asian Games ====
In the 2014 Asian Games in Incheon, South Korea, Akase won the gold medal in the 200 meter backstroke, with a time of 2:10.31, 3/10th's of a second faster than Chinese swimmer Chen Jie. She also competed in the 50 meter backstroke, finishing seventh in the finals with a time of 29.18.

==== Short Course Swimming World Championships ====
At the 2014 FINA Short-Course Swimming Championships in Doha, Akase won the bronze medal in the 200 meter backstroke, with a time of 2:02.30. She also swam in the 4x100 individual medley representing Japan. Japan finished third and won bronze. Their total time was 3:50.50.

=== 2015 ===
In 2015, Akase competed at the 2015 World Aquatics Championships in Kazan, representing Japan in the 4x100 meter medley relay. Japan finished 8th in the finals, with a time of 1:00.88, before getting disqualified.

=== 2016 ===
In 2016, Akase competed at the 2016 World Short Course Aquatics Championships in Windsor, Canada. In the 200 meter backstroke finals, she finished 7th with a time of 2:05.02. She also competed in the 100 meter backstroke, but got eliminated in the semi-finals.
