= 2019 FINA Swimming World Cup =

The 2019 FINA Swimming World Cup was a series of seven three-day meets in seven cities between August and November 2019. This edition was held in the long course (50-meter pool) format.

== Meets ==
The 2019 World Cup consisted of the following seven meets, which were divided into three clusters.

Cluster	Meet	Dates	Location	Venue	Results
1	1	2–4 August	Tokyo, Japan	Tokyo Tatsumi International Swimming Center	
1	2	8–10 August	Jinan, China	Jinan Olympic Sports Center	
1	3	15–17 August	Singapore	OCBC Aquatic Centre	
2	4	4–6 October	Budapest, Hungary	Danube Arena	
2	5	11–13 October	Berlin, Germany	SSE (in German)	
3	6	1–3 November	Kazan, Russia	Palace of Water Sports	
3	7	7–9 November	Doha, Qatar	Hamad Aquatic Centre	

== World Cup standings ==
- Composition of points:
  - Best performances (by meets): 1st place: 24 points, 2nd place: 18 points and 3rd place: 12 points;
  - Points for medals (in individual events): gold medal: 12 points, silver medal: 9 points and bronze medal: 6 points;
  - Bonus for world record (WR): 20 points. Tying a WR: 10 points.

=== Men ===
Rank	Name	Nationality	Points awarded							Total
Rank	Name	Nationality	JPN	CHN	SGP	HUN	GER	RUS	QAT	Total
1	Vladimir Morozov	Russia	48	48	60	54	54	33	36	333
2	Danas Rapšys	Lithuania	24	42	45	33	33	33	24	234
3	Arno Kamminga	Netherlands	–	–	–	60	57	36	42	195
4	Michael Andrew	United States	21	27	30	27	27	30	33	195
5	Szebasztián Szabó	Hungary	21	30	27	21	15	12	15	141
6	Andrew Wilson	United States	42	45	45	–	–	–	–	129
7	Yasuhiro Koseki	Japan	42	–	–	–	–	24	42	108
8	Mitch Larkin	Australia	36	36	36	–	–	–	–	108

=== Women ===
Rank	Name	Nationality	Points awarded							Total
Rank	Name	Nationality	JPN	CHN	SGP	HUN	GER	RUS	QAT	Total
1	Cate Campbell	Australia	45	60	45	42	51	57	57	357
2	Katinka Hosszú	Hungary	54	48	54	48	36	36	36	312
3	Michelle Coleman	Sweden	18	27	30	21	39	18	21	174
4	Zsuzsanna Jakabos	Hungary	6	27	30	30	27	21	30	171
5	Kira Toussaint	Netherlands	–	–	–	42	48	30	42	162
6	Emily Seebohm	Australia	36	27	42	–	–	15	39	159
7	Kaylee McKeown	Australia	–	–	–	–	–	45	24	69
8	Vitalina Simonova	Russia	0	21	24	0	0	6	18	69

== Event winners ==
=== 50 m freestyle ===
Meet	Men			Women		
Meet	Winner	Nationality	Time	Winner	Nationality	Time
Tokyo	Vladimir Morozov	Russia	21.56	Michelle Coleman	Sweden	24.66
Jinan	Vladimir Morozov	Russia	21.50	Cate Campbell	Australia	24.16
Singapore	Vladimir Morozov	Russia	21.27 WC	Cate Campbell	Australia	24.02
Budapest	Vladimir Morozov	Russia	21.50	Michelle Coleman	Sweden	24.56
Berlin	Vladimir Morozov	Russia	21.55	Michelle Coleman	Sweden	24.26
Kazan	Vladimir Morozov	Russia	21.71	Cate Campbell	Australia	24.08
Doha	Vladimir Morozov	Russia	21.83	Cate Campbell	Australia	24.11

=== 100 m freestyle ===
Meet	Men			Women		
Meet	Winner	Nationality	Time	Winner	Nationality	Time
Tokyo	Vladimir Morozov	Russia	48.12	Cate Campbell	Australia	52.64 WC
Jinan	Vladimir Morozov	Russia	47.99 WC	Cate Campbell	Australia	52.34 WC
Singapore	Vladimir Morozov	Russia	47.88 WC	Michelle Coleman	Sweden	53.63
Budapest	Vladimir Morozov	Russia	47.99	Cate Campbell	Australia	53.00
Berlin	Vladimir Morozov	Russia	48.02	Cate Campbell	Australia	52.51
Kazan	Vladislav Grinev	Russia	47.78 WC	Cate Campbell	Australia	52.76
Doha	Vladimir Morozov	Russia	48.50	Cate Campbell	Australia	52.61

=== 200 m freestyle ===
Meet	Men			Women		
Meet	Winner	Nationality	Time	Winner	Nationality	Time
Tokyo	Danas Rapšys	Lithuania	1:45.74 WC	Brianna Throssell	Australia	1:56.99
Jinan	Danas Rapšys	Lithuania	1:45.07 WC	Hou Yawen	China	1:58.98
Singapore	Danas Rapšys	Lithuania	1:44.38 WC	Zsuzsanna Jakabos	Hungary	1:58.40
Budapest	Danas Rapšys	Lithuania	1:45.97	Veronika Andrusenko	Russia	1:59.58
Berlin	Danas Rapšys	Lithuania	1:45.82	Barbora Seemanová	Czech Republic	1:58.78
Kazan	Danas Rapšys	Lithuania	1:46.32	Daria S. Ustinova	Russia	1:59.23
Doha	Danas Rapšys	Lithuania	1:45.50	Zsuzsanna Jakabos	Hungary	1:58.86

=== 400 m freestyle ===
Meet	Men			Women		
Meet	Winner	Nationality	Time	Winner	Nationality	Time
Tokyo	Danas Rapšys	Lithuania	3:45.57 WC	Kiah Melverton	Australia	4:06.71
Jinan	Danas Rapšys	Lithuania	3:43.91 WC	Erica Sullivan	United States	4:08.70
Singapore	Danas Rapšys	Lithuania	3:45.59	Maddy Gough	Australia	4:08.09
Budapest	Danas Rapšys	Lithuania	3:49.09	Maddy Gough	Australia	4:10.36
Berlin	Danas Rapšys	Lithuania	3:47.65	Barbora Seemanová	Czech Republic	4:10.06
Kazan	Danas Rapšys	Lithuania	3:44.60	Anna Egorova	Russia	4:08.93
Doha	Danas Rapšys	Lithuania	3:47.87	Marlene Kahler	Austria	4:10.51

=== 1500 m (men) / 800 m (women) freestyle ===
Meet	Men (1500 m)			Women (800 m)		
Meet	Winner	Nationality	Time	Winner	Nationality	Time
Tokyo	Syogo Takeda	Japan	15:07.05	Kiah Melverton	Australia	8:22.24 WC
Jinan	Ji Xinjie	China	15:16.15	Erica Sullivan	United States	8:26.13
Singapore	Ben Roberts	Australia	15:21.58	Erica Sullivan	United States	8:26.60
Budapest	Florian Wellbrock	Germany	14:57.83	Mireia Belmonte	Spain	8:31.42
Berlin	Florian Wellbrock	Germany	15:10.82	Maddy Gough	Australia	8:34.98
Kazan	Ilya Druzhinin	Russia	15:10.73	Yukimi Moriyama	Japan	8:37.24
Doha	Mykhailo Romanchuk	Ukraine	14:51.61 WC	Tjasa Oder	Slovenia	8:34.65

=== 50 m backstroke ===
Meet	Men			Women		
Meet	Winner	Nationality	Time	Winner	Nationality	Time
Tokyo	Vladimir Morozov	Russia	24.53	Emily Seebohm	Australia	28.03
Jinan	Vladimir Morozov	Russia	24.43 =WC	Liu Xiang	China	27.35 WC
Singapore	Vladimir Morozov	Russia	24.40 WC	Holly Barratt	Australia	27.95
Budapest	Vladimir Morozov	Russia	24.70	Kira Toussaint	Netherlands	27.68
Berlin	Vladimir Morozov	Russia	24.75	Kira Toussaint	Netherlands	27.49
Kazan	Vladimir Morozov	Russia	24.55	Kira Toussaint	Netherlands	27.89
Doha	Vladimir Morozov	Russia	24.75	Kira Toussaint	Netherlands	27.80

=== 100 m backstroke ===
Meet	Men			Women		
Meet	Winner	Nationality	Time	Winner	Nationality	Time
Tokyo	Mitch Larkin	Australia	53.76	Emily Seebohm	Australia	59.44
Jinan	Mitch Larkin	Australia	53.79	Katinka Hosszú	Hungary	59.65
Singapore	Mitch Larkin	Australia	53.43	Emily Seebohm	Australia	59.43
Budapest	Ryosuke Irie	Japan	53.50	Kira Toussaint	Netherlands	59.56
Berlin	Ryosuke Irie	Japan	53.26	Kira Toussaint	Netherlands	59.46
Kazan	Grigoriy Tarasevich	Russia	53.76	Kaylee McKeown	Australia	59.25
Doha	Michael Andrew	United States	54.07	Kira Toussaint	Netherlands	59.14

=== 200 m backstroke ===
Meet	Men			Women		
Meet	Winner	Nationality	Time	Winner	Nationality	Time
Tokyo	Mitch Larkin	Australia	1:55.97	Emily Seebohm	Australia	2:09.03
Jinan	Mitch Larkin	Australia	1:56.39	Emily Seebohm	Australia	2:09.56
Singapore	Mitch Larkin	Australia	1:56.60	Emily Seebohm	Australia	2:10.50
Budapest	Ryosuke Irie	Japan	1:56.79	Katalin Burián	Hungary	2:09.98
Berlin	Ryosuke Irie	Japan	1:56.46	Taylor Ruck	Canada	2:08.21
Kazan	Daniel Martin	Romania	1:58.42	Kaylee McKeown	Australia	2:07.92
Doha	Bradley Woodward	Australia	1:58.42	Emily Seebohm	Australia	2:08.54

=== 50 m breaststroke ===
Meet	Men			Women		
Meet	Winner	Nationality	Time	Winner	Nationality	Time
Tokyo	Ilya Shymanovich	Belarus	26.78	Alia Atkinson	Jamaica	30.35
Jinan	Yan Zibei	China	27.12	Alia Atkinson	Jamaica	30.92
Singapore	Nicolò Martinenghi	Italy	27.23	Alia Atkinson	Jamaica	30.31
Budapest	Arno Kamminga	Netherlands	27.13	Ida Hulkko	Finland	30.82
Berlin	Čaba Silađi	Serbia	27.18	Anna Elendt	Germany	31.27
Kazan	Yasuhiro Koseki	Japan	27.07	Jhennifer Conceição	Brazil	30.68
Doha	Yasuhiro Koseki	Japan	27.07	Jhennifer Conceição	Brazil	30.93

=== 100 m breaststroke ===
Meet	Men			Women		
Meet	Winner	Nationality	Time	Winner	Nationality	Time
Tokyo	Ilya Shymanovich	Belarus	58.73 WC	Tatjana Schoenmaker	South Africa	1:06.54
Jinan	Yan Zibei	China	59.08	Alia Atkinson	Jamaica	1:07.06
Singapore	Andrew Wilson	United States	58.93	Alia Atkinson	Jamaica	1:07.35
Budapest	Arno Kamminga	Netherlands	59.05	Ida Hulkko	Finland	1:07.42
Berlin	Arno Kamminga	Netherlands	59.15	Jessica Vall	Spain	1:07.76
Kazan	Anton Chupkov	Russia	58.94	Arianna Castiglioni	Italy	1:07.59
Doha	Yasuhiro Koseki	Japan	59.11	Jhennifer Conceição	Brazil	1:08.28

=== 200 m breaststroke ===
Meet	Men			Women		
Meet	Winner	Nationality	Time	Winner	Nationality	Time
Tokyo	Andrew Wilson	United States	2:07.77	Tatjana Schoenmaker	South Africa	2:22.35 WC
Jinan	Andrew Wilson	United States	2:08.24	Vitalina Simonova	Russia	2:24.52
Singapore	Andrew Wilson	United States	2:09.11	Vitalina Simonova	Russia	2:25.65
Budapest	Arno Kamminga	Netherlands	2:07.96	Tjaša Vozel	Slovenia	2:26.52
Berlin	Arno Kamminga	Netherlands	2:09.03	Jessica Vall	Spain	2:27.14
Kazan	Anton Chupkov	Russia	2:07.71	Maria Temnikova	Russia	2:24.10
Doha	Anton Chupkov	Russia	2:08.37	Eszter Békési	Hungary	2:28.24

=== 50 m butterfly ===
Meet	Men			Women		
Meet	Winner	Nationality	Time	Winner	Nationality	Time
Tokyo	Andriy Govorov	Ukraine	23.10	Holly Barratt	Australia	25.96
Jinan	Szebasztián Szabó	Hungary	22.93	Cate Campbell	Australia	25.63
Singapore	Michael Andrew	United States	23.07	Holly Barratt	Australia	25.31
Budapest	Szebasztián Szabó	Hungary	23.22	Ranomi Kromowidjojo	Netherlands	25.63
Berlin	Michael Andrew	United States	23.22	Ranomi Kromowidjojo	Netherlands	25.67
Kazan	Michael Andrew	United States	23.14	Arina Surkova	Russia	25.62
Doha	Michael Andrew	United States	22.94	Jeanette Ottesen	Denmark	26.06

=== 100 m butterfly ===
Meet	Men			Women		
Meet	Winner	Nationality	Time	Winner	Nationality	Time
Tokyo	Andrew Seliskar	United States	51.34	Louise Hansson	Sweden	57.92
Jinan	Szebasztián Szabó	Hungary	51.45	Zhang Yufei	China	57.41
Singapore	Grant Irvine	Australia	51.26	Zhang Yufei	China	57.94
Budapest	Kristóf Milák	Hungary	51.27	Zsuzsanna Jakabos	Hungary	59.14
Berlin	Kristóf Milák	Hungary	51.78	Angelina Köhler	Germany	58.83
Kazan	Mikhail Vekovishchev	Russia	51.56	Arina Surkova	Russia	57.78
Doha	Chad le Clos	South Africa	51.70	Katinka Hosszú	Hungary	58.19

=== 200 m butterfly ===
Meet	Men			Women		
Meet	Winner	Nationality	Time	Winner	Nationality	Time
Tokyo	Nao Horomura	Japan	1:55.25	Katinka Hosszú	Hungary	2:07.10
Jinan	Grant Irvine	Australia	1:55.94	Katinka Hosszú	Hungary	2:07.26
Singapore	Grant Irvine	Australia	1:56.77	Katinka Hosszú	Hungary	2:07.07
Budapest	Bence Biczó	Hungary	1:58.67	Katinka Hosszú	Hungary	2:08.55
Berlin	Kristóf Milák	Hungary	1:55.47	Katinka Hosszú	Hungary	2:09.13
Kazan	Daniil Pakhomov	Russia	1:57.85	Katinka Hosszú	Hungary	2:08.23
Doha	Chad le Clos	South Africa	1:57.66	Katinka Hosszú	Hungary	2:08.60

=== 200 m individual medley ===
Meet	Men			Women		
Meet	Winner	Nationality	Time	Winner	Nationality	Time
Tokyo	Mitch Larkin	Australia	1:57.06 WC	Katinka Hosszú	Hungary	2:08.63
Jinan	Mitch Larkin	Australia	1:57.26	Katinka Hosszú	Hungary	2:09.41
Singapore	Mitch Larkin	Australia	1:57.43	Katinka Hosszú	Hungary	2:08.63
Budapest	Michael Andrew	United States	1:59.02	Katinka Hosszú	Hungary	2:09.56
Berlin	Jérémy Desplanches	Switzerland	1:58.32	Katinka Hosszú	Hungary	2:10.38
Kazan	Philip Heintz	Germany	1:59.11	Katinka Hosszú	Hungary	2:09.50
Doha	Keita Sunama	Japan	1:59.28	Katinka Hosszú	Hungary	2:09.89

=== 400 m individual medley ===
Meet	Men			Women		
Meet	Winner	Nationality	Time	Winner	Nationality	Time
Tokyo	Daiya Seto	Japan	4:11.41 WC	Katinka Hosszú	Hungary	4:32.30 WC
Jinan	Thomas Fraser-Holmes	Australia	4:20.50	Katinka Hosszú	Hungary	4:36.99
Singapore	Thomas Fraser-Holmes	Australia	4:17.14	Katinka Hosszú	Hungary	4:39.76
Budapest	Yuki Ikari	Japan	4:14.43	Katinka Hosszú	Hungary	4:34.37
Berlin	Yuki Ikari	Japan	4:13.87	Katinka Hosszú	Hungary	4:38.15
Kazan	Patrick Staber	Austria	4:16.64	Katinka Hosszú	Hungary	4:36.77
Doha	Balazs Hollo	Hungary	4:15.17	Katinka Hosszú	Hungary	4:37.39

=== 4 × 100 m mixed relays ===
Meet	4 × 100 m mixed freestyle			4 × 100 m mixed medley		
Meet	Winners	Nationality	Time	Winners	Nationality	Time
Tokyo	Cameron McEvoy; Thomas Fraser-Holmes; Madison Wilson; Cate Campbell	Australia	3:24.89 WC	Natsumi Sakai; Yasuhiro Koseki; Naoki Mizunuma; Rika Omoto	Japan	3:44.75 WC
Jinan	Mitch Larkin; Thomas Fraser-Holmes; Emily Seebohm; Cate Campbell	Australia	3:26.61	Xu Jiayu; Yan Zibei; Zhang Yufei; Zhu Menghui	China	3:43.79 WC
Singapore	Thomas Fraser-Holmes; Mitch Larkin; Emily Seebohm; Cate Campbell	Australia	3:26.45	Michael Andrew; Breeja Larson; Giles Smith; Erica Sullivan	United States	3:52.17
Budapest	Nándor Németh; Szebasztián Szabó; Zsuzsanna Jakabos; Katinka Hosszú	Hungary	3:29.08	Kira Toussaint; Arno Kamminga; Maarten Brzoskowski; Ranomi Kromowidjojo	Netherlands	3:48.03
Berlin	Björn Seeliger; Elias Persson; Michelle Coleman; Hanna Eriksson	Sweden	3:30.49	Ryosuke Irie; Miho Teramura; Rika Omoto; Katsuhiro Matsumoto	Japan	3:50.99
Kazan	Vladislav Grinev; Mikhail Vekovishchev; Maria Kameneva; Daria S. Ustinova	Russia	3:27.85	Grigoriy Tarasevich; Anton Chupkov; Arina Surkova; Maria Kameneva	Russia	3:44.38
Doha	Bradley Woodward; Alexander Graham; Bronte Campbell; Cate Campbell	Australia	3:29.55	Bradley Woodward; Jake Packard; Mikkayla Sheridan; Cate Campbell	Australia	3:46.77

Legend: WR – World record; WJR – World Junior record; WC – World Cup record
