= Palace of Water Sports =

Aquatics centre in Kazan, Russia

- Дворец водных видов спорта
- Kazan Aquatics Palace
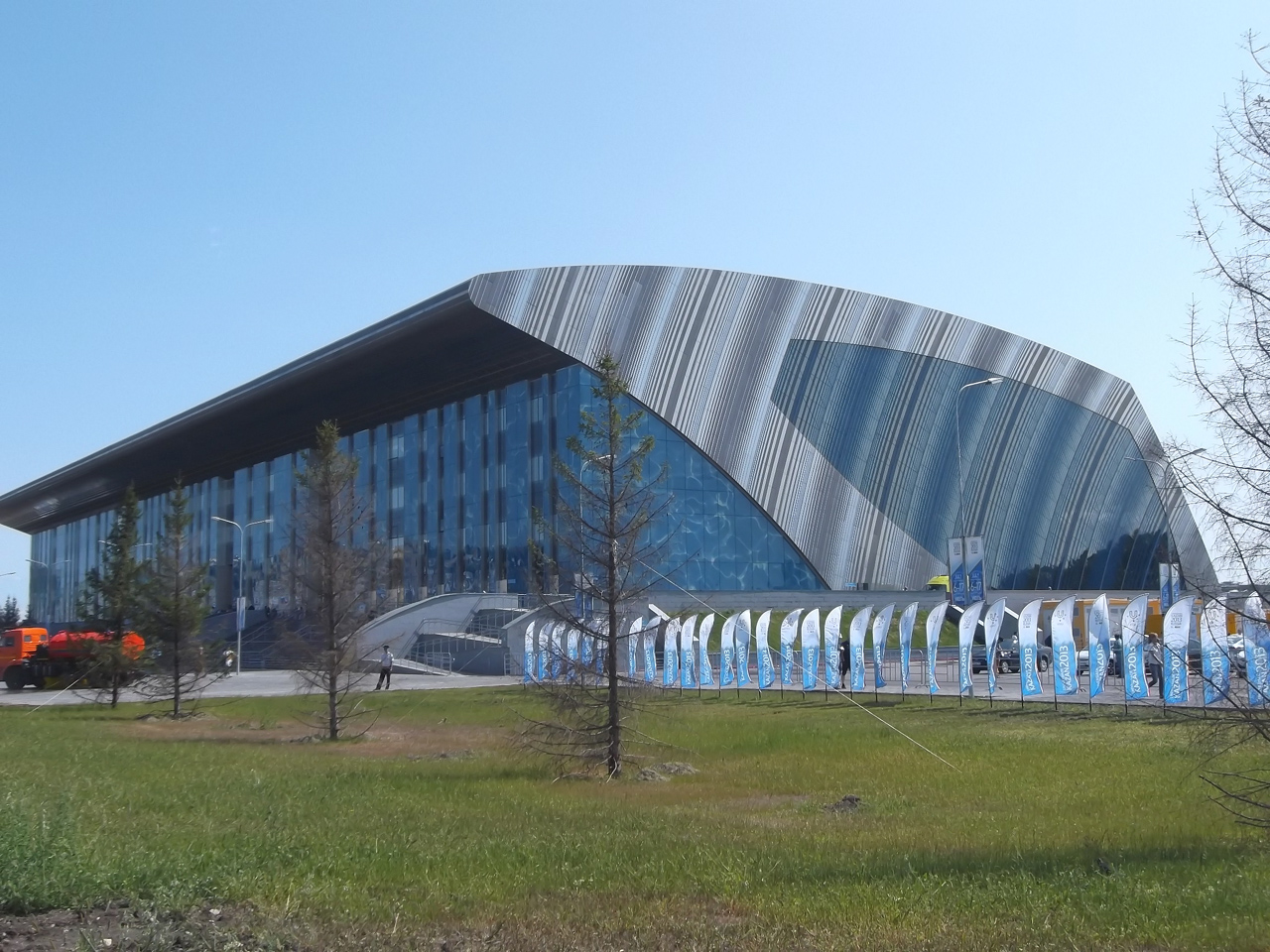
- View from Sibgat Khakim street, 2013
- Interactive map of Palace of Water Sports
- Full name: Palace of Water Sports Kazan
- Location: Kazan, Tatarstan, Russia
- Coordinates: 55.8164°N 49.1597°E
- Owner: Ministry of Sports of the Russian Federation
- Operator: State Academy of Physical Culture, Sports and Tourism of the Volga Region
- Capacity: 4,185

Construction
- Built: 2009–2012
- Opened: 12 April 2013
- Architects: Sergei Tchoban and Sergei Kuznetsov (SPEECH studio) with architects from Ove Arup
- Main contractors: SPEECH Tchoban & Kuznetsov; Ove Arup; AlkosProject

Website
- akvapalace.ru

The Palace of Water Sports (Russian: Дворец водных видов спорта; Tatar: Су спорт төрләре сара) is an indoor aquatics centre in Kazan, Tatarstan, Russia which was built for the 2013 Summer Universiade. Located on the banks of the Kazanka River, the competitions in synchronized swimming, diving, swimming and water polo took place here. It later hosted the diving events for the 2015 World Aquatics Championships. As of 2018, the facility was utilized by approximately 3,000 children per day.

The temporary open arena for water polo with a spectator capacity of 3,500 was built nearby, using its service and support systems.

== Construction ==
The Aquatic Sports Palace was built between September 2009 and October 2012. With an investment of $115 million (€90 million approximately), the design and construction was awarded by tender to a consortium of British and Russian firms specializing in architecture and engineering: SPEECH Tchoban & Kuznetsov, an architectural and design studio based in Moscow with experience in Russia and Germany, Ove Arup, a British company designers of the Bird's Nest Stadium in Beijing and PSO Kazan ООО, a Russian design and construction company established in the Republic of Tatarstan. Taking into account the venue's proximity to the Kazanka River, the building's exterior and footprint were designed to resemble a wave traveling towards the river.

== Technical features ==
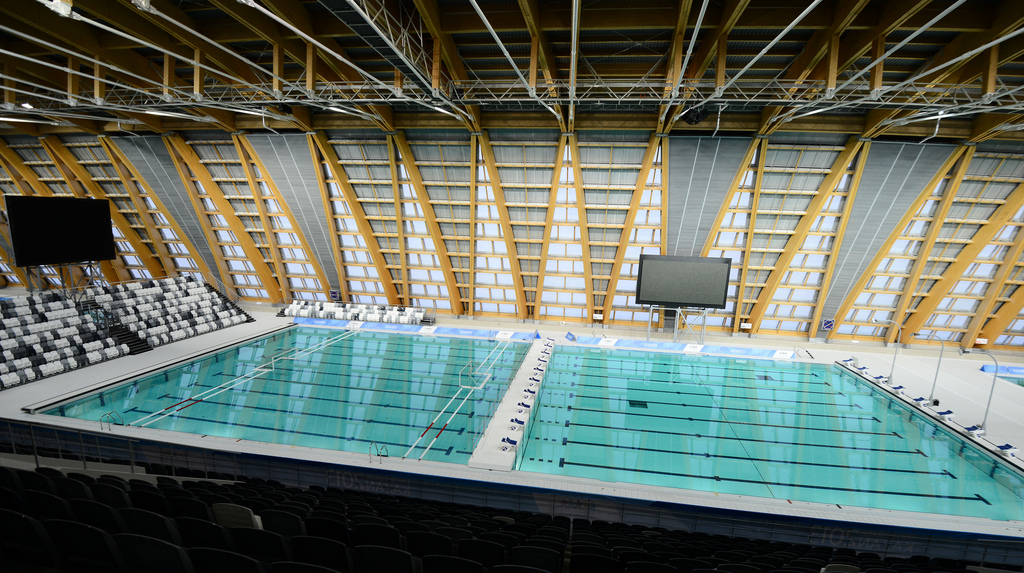
The interior of the sports palace.

The capacity of the venue is for 3,715 spectators, including press booths and seats in the VIP area with special folding stands for athletes, which can increase capacity to 4,185 people. It is equipped with trampolines and a platform.

The building consists of three pools:

- Diving – 33.3×25 m pool (allowable operating depth is 5.5 m)
- Synchronized swimming – 50×25 m (maximum operating depth is 3.0 m)
- Training – 50×25 m (practicing pool depth is 2.2 m)

The three pools are situated end-to-end, making the Palace one of the world's longest swimming venues with 187 metres of uninterrupted pool deck length.

== Notable events ==
- European Junior Swimming Championships: 2019
- European Short Course Swimming Championships: 2021
- FINA Artistic Swimming World Series: 2021
- FINA Diving World Series: 2017, 2018, 2019
- FINA Swimming World Cup: 2018, 2019, 2021
- Russian National Swimming Championships: various, including the 2023 edition
- Russian Solidarity Games: 2022
- Summer Universiade: 2013
- World Aquatics Championships: 2015
- World Junior Synchronised Swimming Championships: 2016
- World Masters Championships: 2015

=== Event transplantations ===
Following the 2022 Russian invasion of Ukraine, a number of events were transplanted from the Palace of Water Sports to other recipients, including one leg of the 2022 FINA Artistic Swimming World Series that was to be the first hosted in conjunction with a FINA Diving World Series at one locality, the 2022 World Junior Swimming Championships, and the 2022 World Short Course Championships.
