= 2024 World Aquatics Swimming World Cup =

Swimming tournament

The 2024 World Aquatics Swimming World Cup was a series of three-day meets in three cities between October and November 2024. This edition was held in the short course (25-meter pool) format.

== Meets ==
The 2024 World Aquatics Swimming World Cup consisted of the following three meets. These were mainly held in Asia.

Meet	Dates	Location	Venue	Results
1	18–20 October	Shanghai, China	Shanghai Oriental Sports Center	
2	24–26 October	Incheon, South Korea	Munhak Park Tae-hwan Aquatics Centre	
3	31 October – 2 November	Singapore	OCBC Aquatic Centre	

== World Cup standings ==
=== Men ===
Rank	Swimmer	Points awarded			Total
Rank	Swimmer	(China)	(South Korea)	(Singapore)	Total
1st place, gold medalist(s)	Léon Marchand (FRA)	58.3	58.1	59.3	175.7
2nd place, silver medalist(s)	Noè Ponti (SUI)	56.8	58.2	56.9	171.9
3rd place, bronze medalist(s)	Duncan Scott (GBR)	56.4	54.5	56.9	167.8
4	Pieter Coetze (RSA)	55.2	56.9	55.2	167.3
5	Qin Haiyang (CHN)	56.7	55.9	40.1	152.7
6	Ilya Shymanovich (NIA)	47.7	45.8	50.1	143.6
7	Isaac Cooper (AUS)	45.9	48.6	48.3	142.8
8	Thomas Ceccon (ITA)	48.6	42.9	49.1	140.6
9	Nyls Korstanje (NED)	46.2	45.3	48.8	140.3
10	Caspar Corbeau (NED)	42.2	44.1	49.2	135.5

=== Women ===
Rank	Swimmer	Points awarded			Total
Rank	Swimmer	(China)	(South Korea)	(Singapore)	Total
1st place, gold medalist(s)	Kate Douglass (USA)	59.1	59.2	60.2	178.5
2nd place, silver medalist(s)	Regan Smith (USA)	59.0	59.4	60.0	178.4
3rd place, bronze medalist(s)	Siobhán Haughey (HKG)	53.2	56.0	51.5	160.7
4	Yu Yiting (CHN)	51.5	53.6	54.1	159.2
5	Mary-Sophie Harvey (CAN)	50.5	55.7	51.6	157.8
6	Tang Qianting (CHN)	49.5	51.8	51.2	152.5
7	Alina Zmushka (NIA)	47.3	45.6	48.9	141.8
8	Katarzyna Wasick (POL)	45.4	48.4	47.0	140.8
9	Beata Nelson (USA)	45.9	44.3	48.1	138.3
10	Ingrid Wilm (CAN)	44.1	49.2	43.6	136.9

== Event winners ==
=== 50 m freestyle ===
Meet	Men		Women	
Meet	Winner	Time	Winner	Time
Shanghai	Dylan Carter (TTO)	21.06	Katarzyna Wasick (POL)	23.87
Incheon	Ji Yu-chan (KOR)	20.80	Katarzyna Wasick (POL)	23.51
Singapore	Dylan Carter (TTO)	20.82	Katarzyna Wasick (POL)	23.23

=== 100 m freestyle ===
Meet	Men		Women	
Meet	Winner	Time	Winner	Time
Shanghai	Thomas Ceccon (ITA)	46.32	Siobhán Haughey (HKG)	51.89
Incheon	Jamie Jack (AUS)	46.48	Siobhán Haughey (HKG)	51.73
Singapore	Pan Zhanle (CHN)	46.09	Kate Douglass (USA)	50.82

=== 200 m freestyle ===
Meet	Men		Women	
Meet	Winner	Time	Winner	Time
Shanghai	Duncan Scott (GBR)	1:40.92	Siobhán Haughey (HKG)	1:51.46
Incheon	Duncan Scott (GBR)	1:40.29	Siobhán Haughey (HKG)	1:51.02
Singapore	Duncan Scott (GBR)	1:39.83	Siobhán Haughey (HKG)	1:51.80

=== 400 m freestyle ===
Meet	Men		Women	
Meet	Winner	Time	Winner	Time
Shanghai	Duncan Scott (GBR)	3:36.98	Liu Yaxin (CHN)	3:58.45
Incheon	Pan Zhanle (CHN)	3:36.43	Mary-Sophie Harvey (CAN)	3:56.78
Singapore	Duncan Scott (GBR)	3:34.46	Katie Grimes (USA)	3:57.61

=== 800 m freestyle ===
Meet	Men		Women	
Meet	Winner	Time	Winner	Time
Shanghai			Tang Muhan (CHN)	8:15.34
Incheon	Pan Zhanle (CHN)	7:35.30 WC		
Singapore			Katie Grimes (USA)	8:14.36

=== 1500 m freestyle ===
Meet	Men		Women	
Meet	Winner	Time	Winner	Time
Shanghai	Charlie Clark (USA)	14:40.57		
Incheon			Kim Chae-yun (KOR)	16:43.29
Singapore	Kazushi Imafuku (JPN)	14:36.32		

=== 50 m backstroke ===
Meet	Men		Women	
Meet	Winner	Time	Winner	Time
Shanghai	Isaac Cooper (AUS)	22.75	Kaylee McKeown (AUS)	25.36 WC
Incheon	Pieter Coetze (RSA)	22.80	Regan Smith (USA)	25.71
Singapore	Isaac Cooper (AUS)	22.61	Regan Smith (USA)	25.48

=== 100 m backstroke ===
Meet	Men		Women	
Meet	Winner	Time	Winner	Time
Shanghai	Pieter Coetze (RSA)	49.35	Regan Smith (USA)	54.89 WC
Incheon	Pieter Coetze (RSA)	49.93	Regan Smith (USA)	54.41 WR
Singapore	Pieter Coetze (RSA)	49.36	Regan Smith (USA)	54.27 WR

=== 200 m backstroke ===
Meet	Men		Women	
Meet	Winner	Time	Winner	Time
Shanghai	Pieter Coetze (RSA)	1:49.12	Regan Smith (USA)	2:00.42
Incheon	Pieter Coetze (RSA)	1:50.05	Regan Smith (USA)	1:59.60
Singapore	Pieter Coetze (RSA)	1:49.88	Regan Smith (USA)	1:58.83 WR

=== 50 m breaststroke ===
Meet	Men		Women	
Meet	Winner	Time	Winner	Time
Shanghai	Qin Haiyang (CHN)	25.38	Tang Qianting (CHN)	28.76
Incheon	Qin Haiyang (CHN)	25.76	Tang Qianting (CHN)	29.03
Singapore	Qin Haiyang (CHN)	25.47	Tang Qianting (CHN)	28.87

=== 100 m breaststroke ===
Meet	Men		Women	
Meet	Winner	Time	Winner	Time
Shanghai	Qin Haiyang (CHN)	55.73	Tang Qianting (CHN)	1:02.53
Incheon	Ilya Shymanovich (NIA)	56.10	Tang Qianting (CHN)	1:02.82
Singapore	Qin Haiyang (CHN)	55.61 =WC	Tang Qianting (CHN)	1:03.10

=== 200 m breaststroke ===
Meet	Men		Women	
Meet	Winner	Time	Winner	Time
Shanghai	Joshua Yong (AUS)	2:01.67	Kate Douglass (USA)	2:15.96
Incheon	Qin Haiyang (CHN)	2:02.57	Kate Douglass (USA)	2:14.16 WR
Singapore	Caspar Corbeau (NED)	2:02.33	Kate Douglass (USA)	2:12.72 WR

=== 50 m butterfly ===
Meet	Men		Women	
Meet	Winner	Time	Winner	Time
Shanghai	Noè Ponti (SUI)	21.68	Kate Douglass (USA)	24.54
Incheon	Noè Ponti (SUI)	21.76	Kate Douglass (USA)	24.73
Singapore	Noè Ponti (SUI)	21.64	Kate Douglass (USA)	24.42

=== 100 m butterfly ===
Meet	Men		Women	
Meet	Winner	Time	Winner	Time
Shanghai	Noè Ponti (SUI)	48.40 WC	Laura Lahtinen (FIN)	55.58
Incheon	Noè Ponti (SUI)	48.81	Laura Lahtinen (FIN)	55.76
Singapore	Noè Ponti (SUI)	48.60	Louise Hansson (SWE)	55.46

=== 200 m butterfly ===
Meet	Men		Women	
Meet	Winner	Time	Winner	Time
Shanghai	Trenton Julian (USA)	1:51.24	Regan Smith (USA)	2:01.85
Incheon	Trenton Julian (USA)	1:51.00	Bella Grant (AUS)	2:03.13
Singapore	Chad Le Clos (RSA)	1:50.42	Brittany Castelluzzo (AUS)	2:03.44

=== 100 m individual medley ===
Meet	Men		Women	
Meet	Winner	Time	Winner	Time
Shanghai	Léon Marchand (FRA)	50.65	Kate Douglass (USA)	56.99
Incheon	Noè Ponti (SUI) Léon Marchand (FRA)	51.00	Kate Douglass (USA)	56.97
Singapore	Léon Marchand (FRA)	49.92 WC	Kate Douglass (USA)	56.57

=== 200 m individual medley ===
Meet	Men		Women	
Meet	Winner	Time	Winner	Time
Shanghai	Léon Marchand (FRA)	1:50.30 WC	Kate Douglass (USA)	2:04.09
Incheon	Léon Marchand (FRA)	1:50.91	Yu Yiting (CHN)	2:04.73
Singapore	Léon Marchand (FRA)	1:48.88 WR	Yu Yiting (CHN)	2:03.99

=== 400 m individual medley ===
Meet	Men		Women	
Meet	Winner	Time	Winner	Time
Shanghai	Léon Marchand (FRA)	4:00.03	Mary-Sophie Harvey (CAN)	4:28.03
Incheon	Léon Marchand (FRA)	3:58.30	Mary-Sophie Harvey (CAN)	4:26.23
Singapore	Léon Marchand (FRA)	3:58.45	Katie Grimes (USA)	4:24.19
