= 2026 World Aquatics Swimming World Cup =

Swimming tournament

The 2026 World Aquatics Swimming World Cup was a series of three-day meets in three cities in October 2026. This edition was held in the short course (25-meter pool) format.

== Meets ==
The 2026 World Aquatics Swimming World Cup consisted of the following three meets.

Meet	Dates	Location	Venue	Result
1	1–3 October	Baku, Azerbaijan	Aquatic Palace	
2	8–10 October	Tashkent, Uzbekistan	Olympic City Aquatic Centre	
3	15–17 October	Astana, Kazakhstan	Barys Arena	

== World Cup standings ==
=== Men ===
Rank	Swimmer	Points awarded			Total
Rank	Swimmer	(Azerbaijan)	(Uzbekistan)	(Kazakhstan)	Total
1st place, gold medalist(s)	Pieter Coetze (RSA)	55.6	58.7	58.6	172.9
2nd place, silver medalist(s)	Egor Kornev (RUS)	59.3	57.4	54.0	170.7
3rd place, bronze medalist(s)	Lucas Henveaux (BEL)	51.1	55.2	57.8	164.1
4	Luke Barr (USA) (Note: Represent U.S swimming club (CLB) in Baku, Tashkent and Astana)	57.4	55.6	48.6	161.6
5	Kirill Prigoda (RUS)	49.7	51.8	55.9	157.4
6	Carson Foster (USA)	53.8	55.9	47.3	157.0
7	Shaine Casas (USA)	50.7	50.6	52.6	153.9
8	Caspar Corbeau (NED)	48.5	47.4	51.4	147.3
9	So Ogata (JPN)	47.6	47.5	47.6	142.7
10	Pavel Samusenko (RUS)	47.1	46.4	47.3	140.8

=== Women ===
Rank	Swimmer	Points awarded			Total
Rank	Swimmer	(Azerbaijan)	(Uzbekistan)	(Kazakhstan)	Total
1st place, gold medalist(s)	Marrit Steenbergen (NED)	58.2	58.5	58.7	175.4
2nd place, silver medalist(s)	Yu Yiting (CHN)	53.7	57.3	55.5	166.5
3rd place, bronze medalist(s)	Roos Vanotterdijk (BEL)	54.2	54.6	54.9	163.7
4	Anna Peplowski (USA) (Note: Represent U.S swimming club (CLB) in Baku)	52.6	52.4	50.5	155.5
5	Taylor Ruck (CAN)	48.2	52.4	48.0	148.6
6	Mona McSharry (IRL)	50.4	50	48.0	148.4
7	Evgeniia Chikunova (RUS)	48.1	48.4	49.3	145.8
8	Chang Mohan (CHN)	47.9	43.1	45.6	136.6
9	Abbie Wood (GBR)	45.0	46.5	44.0	135.5
10	Gan Ching Hwee (SGP)	41.9	41.8	50.1	133.8

== Event winners ==
=== 50 m freestyle ===
Meet	Men		Women	
Meet	Winner	Time	Winner	Time
Baku	Cameron McEvoy (AUS)	20.22 OC, WC	Katarzyna Wasick (POL)	23.40
Tashkent	Cameron McEvoy (AUS)	20.13 OC, WC	Katarzyna Wasick (POL)	23.63
Astana	Cameron McEvoy (AUS)	20.19	Katarzyna Wasick (POL)	23.30

=== 100 m freestyle ===
Meet	Men		Women	
Meet	Winner	Time	Winner	Time
Baku	Egor Kornev (RUS)	44.84 =WR	Marrit Steenbergen (NED)	50.78
Tashkent	Cameron McEvoy (AUS); Egor Kornev (RUS)	45.24	Marrit Steenbergen (NED)	50.32 ER
Astana	Cameron McEvoy (AUS)	45.11	Marrit Steenbergen (NED)	50.52

=== 200 m freestyle ===
Meet	Men		Women	
Meet	Winner	Time	Winner	Time
Baku	Shaine Casas (USA)	1:41.50	Siobhán Haughey (HKG)	1:51.08
Tashkent	Lucas Henveaux (BEL)	1:41.44	Siobhán Haughey (HKG)	1:51.02
Astana	He Yubo (CHN)	1:42.48	Marrit Steenbergen (NED)	1:50.23 ER

=== 400 m freestyle ===
Meet	Men		Women	
Meet	Winner	Time	Winner	Time
Baku	Carson Foster (USA)	3:36.07	Freya Colbert (GBR)	3:59.91
Tashkent	Carson Foster (USA)	3:37.39	Anna Peplowski (USA)	4:00.25
Astana	Lucas Henveaux (BEL)	3:36.01	Anna Peplowski (USA)	4:00.25

=== 800 m freestyle ===
Meet	Men		Women	
Meet	Winner	Time	Winner	Time
Baku	—N/a		Gan Ching Hwee (SGP)	8:15.73
Tashkent	Lucas Henveaux (BEL)	7:37.83	—N/a	
Astana	Lucas Henveaux (BEL)	7:30.76	Gan Ching Hwee (SGP)	8:13.18

=== 1500 m freestyle ===
Meet	Men		Women	
Meet	Winner	Time	Winner	Time
Baku	Lucas Henveaux (BEL)	14:34.98	—N/a	
Tashkent	—N/a		Gan Ching Hwee (SGP)	15:45.23
Astana	Lucas Henveaux (BEL)	14:33.14	Gan Ching Hwee (SGP)	15:38.41 AS

=== 50 m backstroke ===
Meet	Men		Women	
Meet	Winner	Time	Winner	Time
Baku	Egor Kornev (RUS)	22.23 WC	Marrit Steenbergen (NED)	25.75
Tashkent	Pieter Coetze (RSA)	22.09 WR	Marrit Steenbergen (NED)	25.70
Astana	Pieter Coetze (RSA)	22.36	Marrit Steenbergen (NED)	25.67

=== 100 m backstroke ===
Meet	Men		Women	
Meet	Winner	Time	Winner	Time
Baku	Pieter Coetze (RSA)	49.11 AF	Marrit Steenbergen (NED)	55.17
Tashkent	Pieter Coetze (RSA)	48.21 AF	Marrit Steenbergen (NED)	55.32
Astana	Pieter Coetze (RSA)	48.40	Marrit Steenbergen (NED)	55.43

=== 200 m backstroke ===
Meet	Men		Women	
Meet	Winner	Time	Winner	Time
Baku	Pieter Coetze (RSA)	1:49.64	Anna Peplowski (USA)	2:02.34
Tashkent	Pieter Coetze (RSA)	1:49.32	Taylor Ruck (CAN)	2:02.41
Astana	Pieter Coetze (RSA)	1:48.08	Taylor Ruck (CAN)	2:02.29

=== 50 m breaststroke ===
Meet	Men		Women	
Meet	Winner	Time	Winner	Time
Baku	Qin Haiyang (CHN)	25.67	Florine Gaspard (BEL)	29.75
Tashkent	Michael Houlie (RSA)	25.67	Ralina Giliazova (RUS)	29.76
Astana	Kirill Prigoda (RUS)	25.77	Ralina Giliazova (RUS)	29.54

=== 100 m breaststroke ===
Meet	Men		Women	
Meet	Winner	Time	Winner	Time
Baku	Kirill Prigoda (RUS)	56.08	Mona McSharry (IRL)	1:04.21
Tashkent	Kirill Prigoda (RUS)	55.98	Mona McSharry (IRL)	1:04.25
Astana	Kirill Prigoda (RUS)	56.03	Mona McSharry (IRL)	1:04.03

=== 200 m breaststroke ===
Meet	Men		Women	
Meet	Winner	Time	Winner	Time
Baku	Luke Barr (USA)	2:01.73	Evgeniia Chikunova (RUS)	2:17.20
Tashkent	Luke Barr (USA)	2:02.40	Evgeniia Chikunova (RUS)	2:17.23
Astana	Caspar Corbeau (NED)	2:01.94	Evgeniia Chikunova (RUS)	2:16.57

=== 50 m butterfly ===
Meet	Men		Women	
Meet	Winner	Time	Winner	Time
Baku	Egor Kornev (RUS)	21.64	Roos Vanotterdijk (BEL)	24.96
Tashkent	Egor Kornev (RUS)	21.28 WR	Roos Vanotterdijk (BEL)	24.75
Astana	Egor Kornev (RUS)	21.82	Roos Vanotterdijk (BEL)	24.56

=== 100 m butterfly ===
Meet	Men		Women	
Meet	Winner	Time	Winner	Time
Baku	Chen Juner (CHN)	49.70	Roos Vanotterdijk (BEL)	55.29
Tashkent	Chen Juner (CHN)	49.75	Roos Vanotterdijk (BEL)	55.20
Astana	Chen Juner (CHN)	49.59	Roos Vanotterdijk (BEL)	54.80

=== 200 m butterfly ===
Meet	Men		Women	
Meet	Winner	Time	Winner	Time
Baku	Chen Juner (CHN)	1:49.37	Chang Mohan (CHN)	2:04.15
Tashkent	Chen Juner (CHN)	1:49.98	Yu Yiting (CHN)	2:02.75
Astana	So Ogata (JPN)	1:49.89	Ellen Walshe (IRL)	2:04.05

=== 100 m individual medley ===
Meet	Men		Women	
Meet	Winner	Time	Winner	Time
Baku	Luke Barr (USA)	51.57	Marrit Steenbergen (NED)	56.82
Tashkent	Luke Barr (USA)	51.05	Marrit Steenbergen (NED)	56.18 ER
Astana	Luke Barr (USA)	51.91	Marrit Steenbergen (NED)	56.54

=== 200 m individual medley ===
Meet	Men		Women	
Meet	Winner	Time	Winner	Time
Baku	Luke Barr (USA)	1:51.34	Yu Yiting (CHN)	2:02.80 AS
Tashkent	Shaine Casas (USA)	1:51.81	Yu Yiting (CHN)	2:03.34
Astana	Shaine Casas (USA)	1:51.98	Yu Yiting (CHN)	2:02.63 AS

=== 400 m individual medley ===
Meet	Men		Women	
Meet	Winner	Time	Winner	Time
Baku	Carson Foster (USA)	3:57.23	Yu Yiting (CHN)	4:24.09
Tashkent	Carson Foster (USA)	3:58.82	Yu Yiting (CHN)	4:27.09
Astana	Ilya Borodin (RUS)	3:58.95	Yu Yiting (CHN)	4:22.74
