= List of World Cup records in swimming =

Below is a list of current World Cup records in swimming claimed at the annual series of swimming meets run by the World Aquatics (formerly FINA). Until August 2015 the events are always held in a short course (25 m) pool. The complete 2015 edition of the FINA World Cup switched to be held in a long course (50 m) pool.

All records were set in finals unless noted otherwise.

== Long Course (50 m) ==
=== Men ===
Event	Time	Name	Club	Date	Meet	Location	Ref
50 m freestyle	21.27	Vladimir Morozov	Russia	15 August 2019	2019 World Cup	Singapore, Singapore	
100 m freestyle	47.78	Vladislav Grinev	Russia	2 November 2019	2019 World Cup	Kazan, Russia	
200 m freestyle	1:44.38	Danas Rapšys	Lithuania	17 August 2019	2019 World Cup	Singapore, Singapore	
400 m freestyle	3:43.91	Danas Rapšys	Lithuania	8 August 2019	2019 World Cup	Jinan, China	
800 m freestyle	7:51.92	Henrik Christiansen	Norway	14 October 2023	2023 World Cup	Athens, Greece	
1500 m freestyle	14:51.61	Mykhailo Romanchuk	Ukraine	8 November 2019	2019 World Cup	Doha, Qatar	
50 m backstroke	24.40	Vladimir Morozov	Russia	16 August 2019	2019 World Cup	Singapore, Singapore	
100 m backstroke	52.11	Mitch Larkin	Australia	6 November 2015	2015 World Cup	Dubai, United Arab Emirates	
200 m backstroke	1:53.17	Mitch Larkin	Australia	7 November 2015	2015 World Cup	Dubai, United Arab Emirates	
50 m breaststroke	26.29	Qin Haiyang	China	7 October 2023	2023 World Cup	Berlin, Germany	
100 m breaststroke	57.69	Qin Haiyang	China	6 October 2023	2023 World Cup	Berlin, Germany	
200 m breaststroke	2:07.32	Qin Haiyang	China	22 October 2023	2023 World Cup	Budapest, Hungary	
50m butterfly	22.82	Andriy Govorov	Ukraine	15 September 2018	2018 World Cup	Doha, Qatar	
100m butterfly	51.04	Chad le Clos	South Africa	16 August 2015	2015 World Cup	Chartres, France	
200m butterfly	1:54.18	Chad le Clos	South Africa	15 August 2015	2015 World Cup	Chartres, France	
200m individual medley	1:57.06	Mitch Larkin	Australia	3 August 2019	2019 World Cup	Tokyo, Japan	
400m individual medley	4:11.41	Daiya Seto	Japan	4 August 2019	2019 World Cup	Tokyo, Japan	

Legend: # – Record awaiting ratification by FINA; WR – World record; e – equalled existing record;
Records not set in finals: h – heat; † – en route to final mark; so – swim-off

=== Women ===
Event	Time		Name	Club	Date	Meet	Location	Ref
50m freestyle	23.83		Sarah Sjöström	Sweden	7 September 2018	2018 World Cup	Kazan, Russia	
100m freestyle	52.02		Siobhan Haughey	Hong Kong	8 October 2023	2023 World Cup	Berlin, Germany	
200m freestyle	1:54.08		Siobhan Haughey	Hong Kong	21 October 2023	2023 World Cup	Budapest, Hungary	
400m freestyle	4:01.09		Erika Fairweather	New Zealand	6 October 2023	2023 World Cup	Berlin, Germany	
800m freestyle	8:15.11		Lani Pallister	Australia	22 October 2023	2023 World Cup	Budapest, Hungary	
1500m freestyle	15:55.73		Lani Pallister	Australia	15 October 2023	2023 World Cup	Athens, Greece	
50m backstroke	26.86	WR	Kaylee McKeown	Australia	20 October 2023	2023 World Cup	Budapest, Hungary	
100m backstroke	57.33		Kaylee McKeown	Australia	21 October 2023	2023 World Cup	Budapest, Hungary	
200m backstroke	2:04.81		Kaylee McKeown	Australia	22 October 2023	2023 World Cup	Budapest, Hungary	
50m breaststroke	29.56		Ruta Meilutyte	Lithuania	8 October 2023	2023 World Cup	Berlin, Germany	
100m breaststroke	1:05.75		Benedetta Pilato	Italy	21 October 2023	2023 World Cup	Budapest, Hungary	
200m breaststroke	2:21.52		Tes Schouten	Netherlands	20 October 2023	2023 World Cup	Budapest, Hungary	
50m butterfly	24.97		Sarah Sjöström	Sweden	14 October 2023	2023 World Cup	Athens, Greece	
100m butterfly	56.06		Zhang Yufei	China	15 October 2023	2023 World Cup	Athens, Greece	
200m butterfly	2:05.65		Zhang Yufei	China	20 October 2023	2023 World Cup	Budapest, Hungary	
200m individual medley	2:08.15	h	Katinka Hosszú	Hungary	17 August 2019	2019 World Cup	Singapore, Singapore	
400m individual medley	4:32.30		Katinka Hosszú	Hungary	3 August 2019	2019 World Cup	Tokyo, Japan	

Legend: # – Record awaiting ratification by FINA; WR – World record; e – equalled existing record;
Records not set in finals: h – heat; † – en route to final mark; so – swim-off

=== Mixed relay ===
Event	Time	Name	Club	Date	Meet	Location	Ref
4×100 m freestyle relay	3:24.89	Cameron McEvoy (48.89); Thomas Fraser-Holmes (49.45); Madison Wilson (54.29); Cate Campbell (52.26)	Australia	3 August 2019	2019 World Cup	Tokyo, Japan	
4×100 m medley relay	3:43.79	Xu Jiayu (53.43); Yan Zibei (58.31); Zhang Yufei (58.28); Zhu Menghui (53.77)	China	10 August 2019	2019 World Cup	Jinan, China	

Legend: # – Record awaiting ratification by FINA; WR – World record; e – equalled existing record;
Records not set in finals: h – heat; † – en route to final mark; so – swim-off

== Short Course (25 m) ==
=== Men ===
Event	Time		Name	Nationality	Date	Meet	Location	Ref
50 m freestyle	20.13	OC	Cameron McEvoy	Australia	8 October 2026	2026 World Cup	Tashkent, Uzbekistan	
100 m freestyle	44.84	=, WR	Kyle Chalmers	Australia	29 October 2021	2021 World Cup	Kazan, Russia	
100 m freestyle	44.84	=, WR	Egor Kornev	Russia	2 October 2026	2026 World Cup	Baku, Azerbaijan	
200 m freestyle	1:39.37	ER	Paul Biedermann	Germany	15 November 2009	2009 World Cup	Berlin, Germany	
400 m freestyle	3:32.77		Paul Biedermann	Germany	14 November 2009	2009 World Cup	Berlin, Germany	
800 m freestyle	7:29.50		Zalán Sárkány	Hungary	18 October 2025	2025 World Cup	Westmont, United States	
1500 m freestyle	14:15.49		Mykhailo Romanchuk	Ukraine	22 October 2016	2016 World Cup	Singapore, Singapore	
50 m backstroke	22.23		Egor Kornev	Russia	2 October 2026	2026 World Cup	Baku, Azerbaijan	
100 m backstroke	48.16	WR	Hubert Kós	Hungary	25 October 2025	2025 World Cup	Toronto, Canada	
200 m backstroke	1:45.12	WR	Hubert Kós	Hungary	23 October 2025	2025 World Cup	Toronto, Canada	
50 m breaststroke	25.25		Cameron van der Burgh	South Africa	14 November 2009	2009 World Cup	Berlin, Germany	
100 m breaststroke	55.55		Caspar Corbeau	Netherlands	23 October 2025	2025 World Cup	Toronto, Canada	
200 m breaststroke	1:59.52	WR	Caspar Corbeau	Netherlands	25 October 2025	2025 World Cup	Toronto, Canada	
50 m butterfly	21.50	h	Noè Ponti	Switzerland	2 November 2024	2024 World Cup	Singapore, Singapore	
100 m butterfly	47.68	WR	Joshua Liendo	Canada	23 October 2025	2025 World Cup	Toronto, Canada	
200 m butterfly	1:48.46		Ilya Kharun	Canada	18 October 2025	2025 World Cup	Westmont, United States	
100 m individual medley	49.92		Léon Marchand	France	31 October 2024	2024 World Cup	Singapore, Singapore	
200 m individual medley	1:48.88	WR	Léon Marchand	France	1 November 2024	2024 World Cup	Singapore, Singapore	
400 m individual medley	3:56.13		Shaine Casas	United States	25 October 2025	2025 World Cup	Toronto, Canada	

Legend: # – Record awaiting ratification by FINA; WR – World record; e – equalled existing record;
Records not set in finals: h – heat; † – en route to final mark; so – swim-off

=== Women ===
Event	Time		Name	Nationality	Date	Meet	Location	Ref
50 m freestyle	22.93		Ranomi Kromowidjojo	Netherlands	7 August 2017	2017 World Cup	Berlin, Germany	
100 m freestyle	49.93	WR	Kate Douglass	United States	25 October 2025	2025 World Cup	Toronto, Canada	
200 m freestyle	1:49.36	WR	Mollie O'Callaghan	Australia	24 October 2025	2025 World Cup	Toronto, Canada	
400 m freestyle	3:51.87		Lani Pallister	Australia	23 October 2025	2025 World Cup	Toronto, Canada	
800 m freestyle	7:54.00	WR	Lani Pallister	Australia	25 October 2025	2025 World Cup	Toronto, Canada	
1500 m freestyle	15:08.24	WR	Katie Ledecky	United States	29 October 2022	2022 World Cup	Toronto, Canada	
50m backstroke	25.35		Kaylee McKeown	Australia	23 October 2025	2025 World Cup	Toronto, Canada	
100m backstroke	54.02	=WR	Regan Smith	United States	18 October 2025	2025 World Cup	Westmont, United States	
200m backstroke	1:57.33	WR	Kaylee McKeown	Australia	25 October 2025	2025 World Cup	Toronto, Canada	
50m breaststroke	28.56		Alia Atkinson	Jamaica	6 October 2018	2018 World Cup	Budapest, Hungary	
100m breaststroke	1:02.36	=WR	Rūta Meilutytė	Lithuania	12 October 2013	2013 World Cup	Moscow, Russia	
100m breaststroke	1:02.36	=WR	Alia Atkinson	Jamaica	26 August 2016	2016 World Cup	Chartres, France	
200m breaststroke	2:12.72		Kate Douglass	United States	31 October 2024	2024 World Cup	Singapore, Singapore	
50m butterfly	23.72	WR	Gretchen Walsh	United States	11 October 2025	2025 World Cup	Carmel, United States	
100m butterfly	53.10		Gretchen Walsh	United States	25 October 2025	2025 World Cup	Toronto, Canada	
200m butterfly	2:00.20		Regan Smith	United States	17 October 2025	2025 World Cup	Westmont, United States	
100m individual medley	55.77		Gretchen Walsh	United States	17 October 2025	2025 World Cup	Westmont, United States	
200m individual medley	2:02.13		Katinka Hosszú	Hungary	31 August 2014	2014 World Cup	Dubai, United Arab Emirates	
400m individual medley	4:18.94		Mireia Belmonte	Spain	12 August 2017	2017 World Cup	Eindhoven, Netherlands	

Legend: # – Record awaiting ratification by FINA; WR – World record; e – equalled existing record;
Records not set in finals: h – heat; † – en route to final mark; so – swim-off

=== Mixed relay ===
Event	Time	Name	Nationality	Date	Meet	Location	Ref
4×50m freestyle relay	1:28.70	Thom de Boer (21.40); Ranomi Kromowidjojo (22.87); Femke Heemskerk (23.29); Jesse Puts (21.14)	Netherlands	7 August 2017	2017 World Cup	Berlin, Germany	
4×50m medley relay	1:37.84	Robert Hurley (23.46); Christian Sprenger (25.91); Alicia Coutts (25.19); Cate Campbell (23.28)	Australia	9 November 2013	2013 World Cup	Tokyo, Japan	

Legend: # – Record awaiting ratification by FINA; WR – World record; e – equalled existing record;
Records not set in finals: h – heat; so – swim-off

== Gallery ==
Some of the current World Cup record holders:

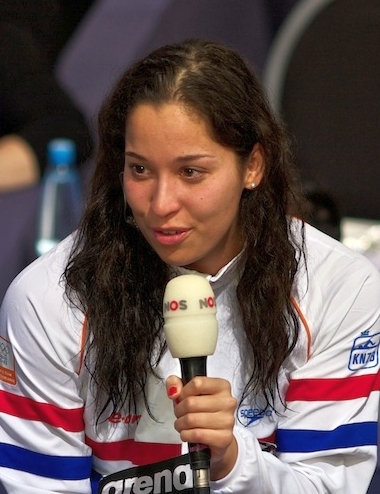
Ranomi Kromowidjojo

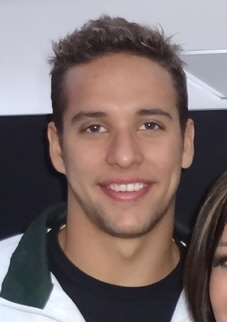
Chad le Clos

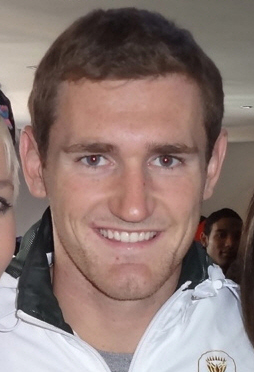
Cameron van der Burgh

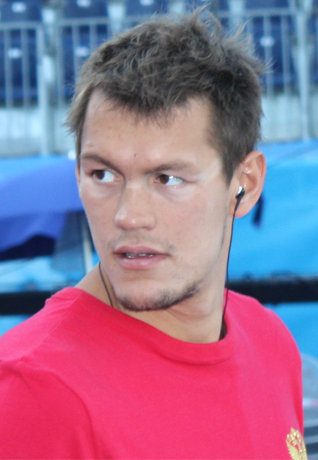
Arkady Vyatchanin

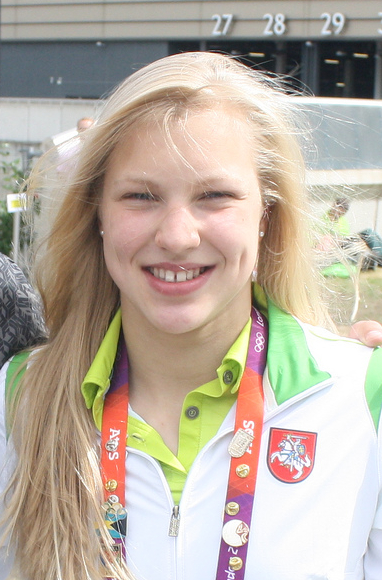
Rūta Meilutytė
