= 2018 FINA Swimming World Cup =

Sport event

The 2018 FINA Swimming World Cup was a series of seven three-day meets in seven cities between September and November 2018. This edition integrated meets held in 25m-pool (short course) as well as meets in 50m-pool (long course).

== Meets ==
The 2018 World Cup consisted of the following seven meets, which were divided into three clusters.

| Cluster | Meet | Dates | Location | Venue | Pool | Results |
|---|---|---|---|---|---|---|
| 1 | 1 | 7–9 September | Kazan, Russia | Palace of Water Sports | 50 m | |
| 1 | 2 | 13–15 September | Doha, Qatar | Hamad Aquatic Centre | 50 m | |
| 2 | 3 | 28–30 September | Eindhoven, Netherlands | Pieter van den Hoogenband Zwemstadion | 25 m | |
| 2 | 4 | 4–6 October | Budapest, Hungary | Danube Arena | 25 m | |
| 3 | 5 | 2–4 November | Beijing, China | Beijing National Aquatics Center | 25 m | |
| 3 | 6 | 9–11 November | Tokyo, Japan | Tokyo Tatsumi International Swimming Center | 25 m | |
| 3 | 7 | 15–17 November | Singapore | OCBC Aquatic Centre | 25 m | |

== World Cup standings ==
- Composition of points:
  - Best performances (by meets): 1st place: 24 points, 2nd place: 18 points and 3rd place: 12 points;
  - Points for medals (in individual events): gold medal: 12 points, silver medal: 9 points and bronze medal: 6 points;
  - Bonus for world record (WR): 20 points.

=== Men ===
| Rank | Name | Nationality | Points awarded (Bonus) | | | | | | | Total |
| Rank | Name | Nationality | RUS | QAT | NED | HUN | CHN | JPN | SGP | Total |
|---|---|---|---|---|---|---|---|---|---|---|
| 1 | Vladimir Morozov | Russia | 54 | 30 | 80 | 54 | 54 | 70 | 60 | 402 |
| 2 | Kirill Prigoda | Russia | 18 | 18 | 42 | 30 | 60 | 45 | 18 | 231 |
| 3 | Mitch Larkin | Australia | 36 | 36 | 36 | 36 | 21 | 18 | 39 | 222 |
| 4 | Michael Andrew | United States | 42 | 45 | 6 | 30 | 27 | 24 | 27 | 201 |
| 5 | Blake Pieroni | United States | 21 | 36 | 30 | 30 | 27 | 15 | 24 | 183 |
| 6 | Anton Chupkov | Russia | 48 | 42 | 18 | 18 | 21 | 9 | 21 | 177 |
| 7 | Xu Jiayu | China | – | – | – | – | 30 | 74 | 54 | 158 |
| 8 | Dávid Verrasztó | Hungary | 27 | 27 | 9 | 9 | 18 | 9 | 6 | 105 |
| 9 | Chad le Clos | South Africa | 30 | 0 | 33 | 33 | – | – | – | 96 |
| 10 | Felipe Lima | Brazil | 21 | 24 | 18 | 24 | – | – | – | 87 |

=== Women ===
| Rank | Name | Nationality | Points awarded (Bonus) | | | | | | | Total |
| Rank | Name | Nationality | RUS | QAT | NED | HUN | CHN | JPN | SGP | Total |
|---|---|---|---|---|---|---|---|---|---|---|
| 1 | Sarah Sjöström | Sweden | 60 | 60 | 54 | 30 | 33 | 48 | 54 | 339 |
| 2 | Katinka Hosszú | Hungary | 36 | 54 | 36 | 36 | 60 | 48 | 36 | 306 |
| 3 | Ranomi Kromowidjojo | Netherlands | 24 | 39 | 30 | 36 | 33 | 57 | 36 | 255 |
| 4 | Yuliya Yefimova | Russia | 42 | 36 | 45 | 30 | 51 | 30 | 21 | 255 |
| 5 | Femke Heemskerk | Netherlands | 24 | 27 | 21 | 21 | 39 | 33 | 33 | 198 |
| 6 | Alia Atkinson | Jamaica | – | – | 21 | 68 | 21 | 24 | 48 | 182 |
| 7 | Emily Seebohm | Australia | – | – | 24 | 36 | 24 | 24 | 30 | 138 |
| 8 | Kira Toussaint | Netherlands | 36 | 30 | 6 | 0 | 18 | 21 | 24 | 135 |
| 9 | Wang Jianjiahe | China | – | – | 54 | 68 | – | – | – | 122 |
| 10 | Vitalina Simonova | Russia | 21 | 27 | 9 | 15 | 15 | 9 | 18 | 114 |

== Event winners ==
=== 50m freestyle ===
| Meet | Men | | | Women | | |
| Meet | Winner | Nationality | Time | Winner | Nationality | Time |
|---|---|---|---|---|---|---|
| Kazan | Vladimir Morozov | Russia | 21.49 WC | Sarah Sjöström | Sweden | 23.83 WC |
| Doha | Vladimir Morozov | Russia | 21.80 | Sarah Sjöström | Sweden | 23.99 |
| Eindhoven | Vladimir Morozov | Russia | 20.69 | Ranomi Kromowidjojo | Netherlands | 23.26 |
| Budapest | Vladimir Morozov | Russia | 20.51 WC | Ranomi Kromowidjojo | Netherlands | 23.23 |
| Beijing | Vladimir Morozov | Russia | 20.87 | Ranomi Kromowidjojo | Netherlands | 23.48 |
| Tokyo | Vladimir Morozov | Russia | 20.49 WC | Sarah Sjöström | Sweden | 23.26 |
| Singapore | Vladimir Morozov | Russia | 20.48 WC | Sarah Sjöström | Sweden | 23.21 |

=== 100m freestyle ===
| Meet | Men | | | Women | | |
| Meet | Winner | Nationality | Time | Winner | Nationality | Time |
|---|---|---|---|---|---|---|
| Kazan | Vladimir Morozov | Russia | 48.28 | Sarah Sjöström | Sweden | 52.99 |
| Doha | Blake Pieroni | United States | 48.11 WC | Sarah Sjöström | Sweden | 53.13 |
| Eindhoven | Vladimir Morozov | Russia | 45.69 | Sarah Sjöström | Sweden | 51.21 |
| Budapest | Vladimir Morozov | Russia | 45.30 | Ranomi Kromowidjojo | Netherlands | 51.01 |
| Beijing | Vladimir Morozov | Russia | 45.66 | Ranomi Kromowidjojo | Netherlands | 51.51 |
| Tokyo | Vladimir Morozov | Russia | 45.16 WC | Ranomi Kromowidjojo | Netherlands | 51.26 |
| Singapore | Vladimir Morozov | Russia | 44.95 WC | Sarah Sjöström | Sweden | 51.13 |

=== 200m freestyle ===
| Meet | Men | | | Women | | |
| Meet | Winner | Nationality | Time | Winner | Nationality | Time |
|---|---|---|---|---|---|---|
| Kazan | Blake Pieroni | United States | 1:47.32 | Sarah Sjöström | Sweden | 1:55.98 |
| Doha | Blake Pieroni | United States | 1:47.20 | Sarah Sjöström | Sweden | 1:56.32 |
| Eindhoven | Blake Pieroni | United States | 1:41.83 | Sarah Sjöström | Sweden | 1:52.25 |
| Budapest | Blake Pieroni | United States | 1:42.00 | Sarah Sjöström | Sweden | 1:51.60 |
| Beijing | Blake Pieroni | United States | 1:42.65 | Femke Heemskerk | Netherlands | 1:52.22 |
| Tokyo | Kyle Chalmers | Australia | 1:41.83 | Femke Heemskerk | Netherlands | 1:51.91 |
| Singapore | Blake Pieroni | United States | 1:41.15 | Femke Heemskerk | Netherlands | 1:52.57 |

=== 400m freestyle ===
| Meet | Men | | | Women | | |
| Meet | Winner | Nationality | Time | Winner | Nationality | Time |
|---|---|---|---|---|---|---|
| Kazan | Yaroslav Potapov | Russia | 3:54.78 | Katinka Hosszú | Hungary | 4:12.09 |
| Doha | Blake Pieroni | United States | 3:53.98 | Katinka Hosszú | Hungary | 4:10.02 |
| Eindhoven | Mack Horton | Australia | 3:39.52 | Wang Jianjiahe | China | 3:54.63 WJ |
| Budapest | Mack Horton | Australia | 3:41.78 | Wang Jianjiahe | China | 3:53.97 WR WJ |
| Beijing | Ji Xinjie | China | 3:40.82 | Li Bingjie | China | 3:59.20 |
| Tokyo | Mack Horton | Australia | 3:40.58 | Femke Heemskerk | Netherlands | 4:01.29 |
| Singapore | Mack Horton | Australia | 3:41.44 | Reva Foos | Germany | 4:07.07 |

=== 1500m (men) / 800m (women) freestyle ===
| Meet | Men (1500 m) | | | Women (800 m) | | |
| Meet | Winner | Nationality | Time | Winner | Nationality | Time |
|---|---|---|---|---|---|---|
| Kazan | Yaroslav Potapov | Russia | 15:27.92 | Zhou Chanzhen | China | 8:35.03 |
| Doha | Marcos Gil | Spain | 15:28.19 | Katinka Hosszú | Hungary | 8:34.58 |
| Eindhoven | Maksym Shemberev | Azerbaijan | 14:45.17 | Wang Jianjiahe | China | 8:03.86 WJ |
| Budapest | Mack Horton | Australia | 14:39.84 | Wang Jianjiahe | China | 7:59.44 WJ |
| Beijing | Mykhailo Romanchuk | Ukraine | 14:29.88 | Yang Caiping | China | 8:29.05 |
| Tokyo | Mykhailo Romanchuk | Ukraine | 14:27.93 | Mayuko Gotou | Japan | 8:19.74 |
| Singapore | Mack Horton | Australia | 14:44.22 | Femke Heemskerk | Netherlands | 8:33.00 |

=== 50m backstroke ===
| Meet | Men | | | Women | | |
| Meet | Winner | Nationality | Time | Winner | Nationality | Time |
|---|---|---|---|---|---|---|
| Kazan | Vladimir Morozov | Russia | 24.43 WC | Kira Toussaint | Netherlands | 28.18 |
| Doha | Michael Andrew | United States | 24.49 | Kira Toussaint | Netherlands | 28.01 |
| Eindhoven | Mitch Larkin | Australia | 23.34 | Etiene Medeiros | Brazil | 26.07 |
| Budapest | Michael Andrew | United States | 23.19 | Emily Seebohm | Australia | 26.05 |
| Beijing | Xu Jiayu | China | 22.70 | Kira Toussaint | Netherlands | 26.21 |
| Tokyo | Xu Jiayu | China | 22.87 | Kira Toussaint | Netherlands | 26.21 |
| Singapore | Xu Jiayu | China | 22.71 | Kira Toussaint | Netherlands | 26.04 |

=== 100m backstroke ===
| Meet | Men | | | Women | | |
| Meet | Winner | Nationality | Time | Winner | Nationality | Time |
|---|---|---|---|---|---|---|
| Kazan | Mitch Larkin | Australia | 53.99 | Kira Toussaint | Netherlands | 59.80 |
| Doha | Mitch Larkin | Australia | 53.68 | Katinka Hosszú | Hungary | 59.63 |
| Eindhoven | Mitch Larkin | Australia | 50.08 | Kathleen Baker | United States | 55.91 |
| Budapest | Mitch Larkin | Australia | 49.96 | Emily Seebohm | Australia | 55.81 |
| Beijing | Mitch Larkin | Australia | 49.97 | Minna Atherton | Australia | 56.49 |
| Tokyo | Xu Jiayu | China | 48.88 WR | Minna Atherton | Australia | 56.04 |
| Singapore | Xu Jiayu | China | 48.98 | Kira Toussaint | Netherlands | 55.92 |

=== 200m backstroke ===
| Meet | Men | | | Women | | |
| Meet | Winner | Nationality | Time | Winner | Nationality | Time |
|---|---|---|---|---|---|---|
| Kazan | Mitch Larkin | Australia | 1:57.23 | Katinka Hosszú | Hungary | 2:10.13 |
| Doha | Mitch Larkin | Australia | 1:57.45 | Katinka Hosszú | Hungary | 2:11.00 |
| Eindhoven | Mitch Larkin | Australia | 1:49.75 | Kathleen Baker | United States | 2:00.85 |
| Budapest | Mitch Larkin | Australia | 1:49.52 | Emily Seebohm | Australia | 1:59.94 |
| Beijing | Xu Jiayu | China | 1:49.08 | Minna Atherton | Australia | 2:02.02 |
| Tokyo | Xu Jiayu | China | 1:48.32 | Emily Seebohm | Australia | 2:01.13 |
| Singapore | Xu Jiayu | China | 1:48.93 | Emily Seebohm | Australia | 2:01.60 |

=== 50m breaststroke ===
| Meet | Men | | | Women | | |
| Meet | Winner | Nationality | Time | Winner | Nationality | Time |
|---|---|---|---|---|---|---|
| Kazan | Felipe Lima | Brazil | 26.90 | Yuliya Yefimova | Russia | 30.92 |
| Doha | Felipe Lima | Brazil | 26.84 | Yuliya Yefimova | Russia | 30.43 |
| Eindhoven | Felipe Lima | Brazil | 25.92 | Alia Atkinson | Jamaica | 29.18 |
| Budapest | Felipe Lima | Brazil | 25.88 | Alia Atkinson | Jamaica | 28.56 |
| Beijing | Kirill Prigoda | Russia | 26.02 | Alia Atkinson | Jamaica | 29.16 |
| Tokyo | Peter John Stevens | Slovenia | 26.03 | Alia Atkinson | Jamaica | 28.95 |
| Singapore | Ilya Shymanovich | Belarus | 25.95 | Alia Atkinson | Jamaica | 28.93 |

=== 100m breaststroke ===
| Meet | Men | | | Women | | |
| Meet | Winner | Nationality | Time | Winner | Nationality | Time |
|---|---|---|---|---|---|---|
| Kazan | Anton Chupkov | Russia | 59.53 | Yuliya Yefimova | Russia | 1:05.94 |
| Doha | Felipe Lima | Brazil | 59.61 | Yuliya Yefimova | Russia | 1:06.27 |
| Eindhoven | Kirill Prigoda | Russia | 56.88 | Yuliya Yefimova | Russia | 1:03.41 |
| Budapest | Felipe Lima | Brazil | 56.69 | Alia Atkinson | Jamaica | 1:02.80 |
| Beijing | Kirill Prigoda | Russia | 56.61 | Yuliya Yefimova | Russia | 1:03.09 |
| Tokyo | Kirill Prigoda | Russia | 56.58 | Alia Atkinson | Jamaica | 1:03.09 |
| Singapore | Yan Zibei | China | 56.34 | Alia Atkinson | Jamaica | 1:02.74 |

=== 200m breaststroke ===
| Meet | Men | | | Women | | |
| Meet | Winner | Nationality | Time | Winner | Nationality | Time |
|---|---|---|---|---|---|---|
| Kazan | Anton Chupkov | Russia | 2:07.59 WC | Vitalina Simonova | Russia | 2:23.86 |
| Doha | Anton Chupkov | Russia | 2:08.77 | Yuliya Yefimova | Russia | 2:23.55 |
| Eindhoven | Kirill Prigoda | Russia | 2:01.59 | Yuliya Yefimova | Russia | 2:15.62 |
| Budapest | Kirill Prigoda | Russia | 2:01.58 | Yuliya Yefimova | Russia | 2:17.88 |
| Beijing | Kirill Prigoda | Russia | 2:01.59 | Yuliya Yefimova | Russia | 2:16.98 |
| Tokyo | Kirill Prigoda | Russia | 2:01.30 | Yuliya Yefimova | Russia | 2:16.29 |
| Singapore | Anton Chupkov | Russia | 2:01.73 | Yuliya Yefimova | Russia | 2:16.05 |

=== 50m butterfly ===
| Meet | Men | | | Women | | |
| Meet | Winner | Nationality | Time | Winner | Nationality | Time |
|---|---|---|---|---|---|---|
| Kazan | Andriy Govorov | Ukraine | 22.87 WC | Sarah Sjöström | Sweden | 25.39 WC |
| Doha | Andriy Govorov | Ukraine | 22.82 WC | Sarah Sjöström | Sweden | 25.22 WC |
| Eindhoven | Nicholas Santos | Brazil | 22.08 | Sarah Sjöström | Sweden | 24.61 |
| Budapest | Nicholas Santos | Brazil | 21.75 WR | Ranomi Kromowidjojo | Netherlands | 24.65 |
| Beijing | Vladimir Morozov | Russia | 22.27 | Sarah Sjöström | Sweden | 25.03 |
| Tokyo | Vladimir Morozov | Russia | 22.29 | Ranomi Kromowidjojo | Netherlands | 24.51 |
| Singapore | Vladimir Morozov | Russia | 22.17 | Sarah Sjöström | Sweden | 24.63 |

=== 100m butterfly ===
| Meet | Men | | | Women | | |
| Meet | Winner | Nationality | Time | Winner | Nationality | Time |
|---|---|---|---|---|---|---|
| Kazan | Michael Andrew | United States | 51.96 | Sarah Sjöström | Sweden | 57.42 WC |
| Doha | Michael Andrew | United States | 51.83 | Sarah Sjöström | Sweden | 56.46 WC |
| Eindhoven | Chad Le Clos | South Africa | 49.56 | Sarah Sjöström | Sweden | 54.91 WC |
| Budapest | Chad Le Clos | South Africa | 49.22 | Kelsi Dahlia | United States | 54.84 WC |
| Beijing | Li Zhuhao | China | 50.74 | Sarah Sjöström | Sweden | 55.58 |
| Tokyo | Takeshi Kawamoto | Japan | 50.28 | Rikako Ikee | Japan | 55.31 |
| Singapore | Li Zhuhao | China | 49.64 | Sarah Sjöström | Sweden | 55.73 |

=== 200m butterfly ===
| Meet | Men | | | Women | | |
| Meet | Winner | Nationality | Time | Winner | Nationality | Time |
|---|---|---|---|---|---|---|
| Kazan | Chad le Clos | South Africa | 1:56.58 | Katinka Hosszú | Hungary | 2:08.93 |
| Doha | Maksym Shemberev | Azerbaijan | 1:58.45 | Katinka Hosszú | Hungary | 2:09.26 |
| Eindhoven | Chad le Clos | South Africa | 1:51.09 | Katinka Hosszú | Hungary | 2:02.87 |
| Budapest | Chad le Clos | South Africa | 1:50.29 | Katinka Hosszú | Hungary | 2:03.14 |
| Beijing | Li Zhuhao | China | 1:51.94 | Katinka Hosszú | Hungary | 2:02.88 |
| Tokyo | Li Zhuhao | China | 1:50.92 | Katinka Hosszú | Hungary | 2:03.01 |
| Singapore | Li Zhuhao | China | 1:50.96 | Katinka Hosszú | Hungary | 2:02.86 |

=== 100m individual medley ===
| Meet | Men | | | Women | | |
| Meet | Winner | Nationality | Time | Winner | Nationality | Time |
|---|---|---|---|---|---|---|
| Eindhoven | Vladimir Morozov | Russia | 50.26 WR | Katinka Hosszú | Hungary | 57.44 |
| Budapest | Vladimir Morozov | Russia | 50.32 | Katinka Hosszú | Hungary | 57.64 |
| Beijing | Vladimir Morozov | Russia | 50.84 | Katinka Hosszú | Hungary | 57.05 |
| Tokyo | Vladimir Morozov | Russia | 50.26 =WR | Katinka Hosszú | Hungary | 57.25 |
| Singapore | Vladimir Morozov | Russia | 50.31 | Sarah Sjöström | Sweden | 57.49 |

=== 200m individual medley ===
| Meet | Men | | | Women | | |
| Meet | Winner | Nationality | Time | Winner | Nationality | Time |
|---|---|---|---|---|---|---|
| Kazan | Mitch Larkin | Australia | 1:59.47 | Katinka Hosszú | Hungary | 2:12.71 |
| Doha | Mitch Larkin | Australia | 1:59.14 | Katinka Hosszú | Hungary | 2:11.57 |
| Eindhoven | Daiya Seto | Japan | 1:51.09 WC | Katinka Hosszú | Hungary | 2:05.06 |
| Budapest | Mitch Larkin | Australia | 1:52.96 | Katinka Hosszú | Hungary | 2:04.13 |
| Beijing | Wang Shun | China | 1:52.08 | Katinka Hosszú | Hungary | 2:05.25 |
| Tokyo | Wang Shun | China | 1:51.45 | Katinka Hosszú | Hungary | 2:04.65 |
| Singapore | Wang Shun | China | 1:51.84 | Katinka Hosszú | Hungary | 2:04.79 |

=== 400m individual medley ===
| Meet | Men | | | Women | | |
| Meet | Winner | Nationality | Time | Winner | Nationality | Time |
|---|---|---|---|---|---|---|
| Kazan | Dávid Verrasztó | Hungary | 4:20.68 | Katinka Hosszú | Hungary | 4:37.82 |
| Doha | Dávid Verrasztó | Hungary | 4:13.44 WC | Katinka Hosszú | Hungary | 4:39.57 |
| Eindhoven | Daiya Seto | Japan | 3:57.25 WC | Katinka Hosszú | Hungary | 4:25.15 |
| Budapest | Daiya Seto | Japan | 4:01.16 | Katinka Hosszú | Hungary | 4:23.55 |
| Beijing | Dávid Verrasztó | Hungary | 4:04.09 | Katinka Hosszú | Hungary | 4:25.68 |
| Tokyo | Kosuke Hagino | Japan | 4:01.93 | Katinka Hosszú | Hungary | 4:21.91 |
| Singapore | Wang Shun | China | 3:59.99 | Katinka Hosszú | Hungary | 4:24.02 |

=== 4 × 50m mixed relays ===
| Meet | 4 × 50m mixed freestyle | | | 4 × 50m mixed medley | | |
| Meet | Winners | Nationality | Time | Winners | Nationality | Time |
|---|---|---|---|---|---|---|
| Eindhoven | Jesse Puts; Kyle Stolk; Femke Heemskerk; Ranomi Kromowidjojo | Netherlands | 1:29.90 | Kira Toussaint; Arno Kamminga; Ranomi Kromowidjojo; Jesse Puts | Netherlands | 1:38.64 |
| Budapest | Jesse Puts; Ben Schwietert; Femke Heemskerk; Ranomi Kromowidjojo | Netherlands | 1:30.01 | Jesse Puts; Arno Kamminga; Ranomi Kromowidjojo; Femke Heemskerk | Netherlands | 1:38.68 |
| Beijing | Hou Yujie; Yu Hexin; Wu Yue; Zhu Menghui | China | 1:31.17 | Xu Jiayu; Yan Zibei; Zhang Yufei; Zhu Menghui | China | 1:38.69 |
| Tokyo | Kousuke Matsui; Yuuya Tanaka; Mayu Terayama; Aya Satou | Japan | 1:31.72 | Minna Atherton; Matthew Wilson; Emily Seebohm; Kyle Chalmers | Australia | 1:39.74 |
| Singapore | Louis Townsend; Kyle Chalmers; Madison Wilson; Emily Seebohm | Australia | 1:31.57 | Minna Atherton; Matthew Wilson; Emily Seebohm; Kyle Chalmers | Australia | 1:39.69 |

=== 4 × 100m mixed relays ===
| Meet | 4 × 100m mixed freestyle | | | 4 × 100m mixed medley | | |
| Meet | Winners | Nationality | Time | Winners | Nationality | Time |
|---|---|---|---|---|---|---|
| Kazan | Kyle Stolk; Jesse Puts; Femke Heemskerk; Ranomi Kromowidjojo | Netherlands | 3:27.42 WC | Kira Toussaint; Arno Kamminga; Mathys Goosen; Femke Heemskerk | Netherlands | 3:46.10 WC |
| Doha | Kyle Stolk; Jesse Puts; Femke Heemskerk; Ranomi Kromowidjojo | Netherlands | 3:30.81 | Kira Toussaint; Arno Kamminga; Mathys Goosen; Femke Heemskerk | Netherlands | 3:49.18 |
