= 2023 World Aquatics Swimming World Cup =

Series of meets in Europe

The 2023 World Aquatics Swimming World Cup was a series of three-day meets in three cities in October 2023. This edition was held in the long course (50-meter pool) format.

This edition of the World Cup was expected to introduce an "open" category for transgender swimmers in the 50- and 100-meter events. However, there were no entries and the category was shelved.

== Meets ==
The 2023 World Aquatics Swimming World Cup consisted of the following three meets.

| Meet | Dates | Location | Venue | Results |
|---|---|---|---|---|
| 1 | 6–8 October | Berlin, Germany | SSE (in German) | |
| 2 | 13–15 October | Athens, Greece | Athens Olympic Aquatic Centre | |
| 3 | 20–22 October | Budapest, Hungary | Danube Arena | |

== World Cup standings ==
=== Men ===
| Rank | Swimmer | Points awarded | | | Total |
| Rank | Swimmer | (Germany) | (Greece) | (Hungary) | Total |
|---|---|---|---|---|---|
| 1 | Qin Haiyang (CHN) | 58.7 | 58.0 | 58.7 | 175.4 |
| 2 | Thomas Ceccon (ITA) | 57.7 | 55.1 | 55.1 | 167.9 |
| 3 | Matthew Sates (RSA) | 54.4 | 56.1 | 56.3 | 166.8 |
| 4 | Michael Andrew (USA) | 54.5 | 53.9 | 54.5 | 162.9 |
| 5 | Danas Rapšys (LTU) | 54.8 | 52.3 | 46.7 | 153.8 |
| 6 | Kieran Smith (USA) | 43.7 | 47.8 | 48.4 | 139.9 |
| 7 | Isaac Cooper (AUS) | 48.2 | 47.9 | 43.0 | 139.1 |
| 8 | Arno Kamminga (NED) | 48.0 | 42.6 | 46.2 | 136.8 |
| 9 | Nic Fink (USA) | 40.3 | 44.5 | 42.5 | 127.3 |
| 10 | Dylan Carter (TTO) | 39.3 | 43.8 | 42.2 | 125.3 |

=== Women ===
| Rank | Swimmer | Points awarded | | | Total |
| Rank | Swimmer | (Germany) | (Greece) | (Hungary) | Total |
|---|---|---|---|---|---|
| 1 | Kaylee McKeown (AUS) | 58.6 | 59.1 | 59.7 | 177.4 |
| 2 | Siobhán Haughey (HKG) | 54.1 | 55.8 | 56.5 | 166.4 |
| 3 | Zhang Yufei (CHN) | 55.2 | 55.3 | 55.7 | 166.2 |
| 4 | Sarah Sjöström (SWE) | 53.8 | 55.9 | 55.8 | 165.5 |
| 5 | Erika Fairweather (NZL) | 53.6 | 48.4 | 51.3 | 153.3 |
| 6 | Lani Pallister (AUS) | 51.6 | 50.0 | 49.4 | 151.0 |
| 7 | Kylie Masse (CAN) | 45.0 | 45.9 | 48.8 | 139.7 |
| 8 | Ingrid Wilm (CAN) | 41.3 | 42.2 | 44.2 | 127.7 |
| 9 | Jenna Strauch (AUS) | 41.6 | 43.5 | 41.2 | 126.3 |
| 10 | Tes Schouten (NED) | 33.0 | 46.5 | 45.4 | 124.9 |

== Event winners ==
=== 50 m freestyle ===
| Meet | Men | | Women | |
| Meet | Winner | Time | Winner | Time |
|---|---|---|---|---|
| Berlin | Isaac Cooper (AUS) | 21.93 | Sarah Sjöström (SWE) | 23.95 |
| Athens | Michael Andrew (USA) | 21.96 | Sarah Sjöström (SWE) | 24.10 |
| Budapest | Benjamin Proud (GBR) | 21.77 | Sarah Sjöström (SWE) | 23.97 |

=== 100 m freestyle ===
| Meet | Men | | Women | |
| Meet | Winner | Time | Winner | Time |
|---|---|---|---|---|
| Berlin | Thomas Ceccon (ITA) | 47.97 | Siobhán Haughey (HKG) | 52.02 WC |
| Athens | Thomas Ceccon (ITA) | 48.36 | Siobhán Haughey (HKG) | 52.55 |
| Budapest | Thomas Ceccon (ITA) | 48.41 | Siobhán Haughey (HKG) | 52.24 |

=== 200 m freestyle ===
| Meet | Men | | Women | |
| Meet | Winner | Time | Winner | Time |
|---|---|---|---|---|
| Berlin | Danas Rapšys (LTU) | 1:45.75 | Siobhán Haughey (HKG) | 1:55.10 WC |
| Athens | Danas Rapšys (LTU) | 1:45.72 | Siobhán Haughey (HKG) | 1:55.03 WC |
| Budapest | Maximillian Giuliani (AUS) | 1:45.42 | Siobhán Haughey (HKG) | 1:54.08 WC |

=== 400 m freestyle ===
| Meet | Men | | Women | |
| Meet | Winner | Time | Winner | Time |
|---|---|---|---|---|
| Berlin | Danas Rapšys (LTU) | 3:44.86 | Erika Fairweather (NZL) | 4:01.09 WC |
| Athens | Danas Rapšys (LTU) | 3:48.64 | Erika Fairweather (NZL) | 4:01.90 |
| Budapest | Samuel Short (AUS) | 3:44.51 | Erika Fairweather (NZL) | 4:02.35 |

=== 800 m freestyle ===
| Meet | Men | | Women | |
| Meet | Winner | Time | Winner | Time |
|---|---|---|---|---|
| Berlin | | | Lani Pallister (AUS) | 8:16.82 WC |
| Athens | Henrik Christiansen (NOR) | 7:51.92 WC | | |
| Budapest | | | Lani Pallister (AUS) | 8:15.11 WC |

=== 1500 m freestyle ===
| Meet | Men | | Women | |
| Meet | Winner | Time | Winner | Time |
|---|---|---|---|---|
| Berlin | Charlie Clark (USA) | 14:59.21 | | |
| Athens | | | Lani Pallister (AUS) | 15:55.73 WC |
| Budapest | Dávid Betlehem (HUN) | 14:58.04 | | |

=== 50 m backstroke ===
| Meet | Men | | Women | |
| Meet | Winner | Time | Winner | Time |
|---|---|---|---|---|
| Berlin | Michael Andrew (USA) | 24.47 | Kaylee McKeown (AUS) | 27.24 WC |
| Athens | Michael Andrew (USA) | 24.79 | Kaylee McKeown (AUS) | 27.02 WC |
| Budapest | Michael Andrew (USA) | 24.64 | Kaylee McKeown (AUS) | 26.86 WR |

=== 100 m backstroke ===
| Meet | Men | | Women | |
| Meet | Winner | Time | Winner | Time |
|---|---|---|---|---|
| Berlin | Thomas Ceccon (ITA) | 52.27 | Kaylee McKeown (AUS) | 57.95 WC |
| Athens | Thomas Ceccon (ITA) | 52.73 | Kaylee McKeown (AUS) | 57.63 WC |
| Budapest | Thomas Ceccon (ITA) | 52.58 | Kaylee McKeown (AUS) | 57.33 WR |

=== 200 m backstroke ===
| Meet | Men | | Women | |
| Meet | Winner | Time | Winner | Time |
|---|---|---|---|---|
| Berlin | Thomas Ceccon (ITA) | 1:56.64 | Kaylee McKeown (AUS) | 2:06.47 WC |
| Athens | Pieter Coetze (RSA) | 1:56.32 | Kaylee McKeown (AUS) | 2:06.02 WC |
| Budapest | Roman Mityukov (SUI) | 1:56.96 | Kaylee McKeown (AUS) | 2:04.81 WC |

=== 50 m breaststroke ===
| Meet | Men | | Women | |
| Meet | Winner | Time | Winner | Time |
|---|---|---|---|---|
| Berlin | Qin Haiyang (CHN) | 26.29 WC | Rūta Meilutytė (LTU) | 29.56 WC |
| Athens | Qin Haiyang (CHN) | 26.52 | Rūta Meilutytė (LTU) | 30.23 |
| Budapest | Qin Haiyang (CHN) | 26.30 | Benedetta Pilato (ITA) | 30.04 |

=== 100 m breaststroke ===
| Meet | Men | | Women | |
| Meet | Winner | Time | Winner | Time |
|---|---|---|---|---|
| Berlin | Qin Haiyang (CHN) | 57.69 WC | Eneli Jefimova (EST) | 1:06.50 |
| Athens | Qin Haiyang (CHN) | 58.44 | Rūta Meilutytė (LTU) | 1:06.70 |
| Budapest | Qin Haiyang (CHN) | 57.82 | Benedetta Pilato (ITA) | 1:05.83 |

=== 200 m breaststroke ===
| Meet | Men | | Women | |
| Meet | Winner | Time | Winner | Time |
|---|---|---|---|---|
| Berlin | Qin Haiyang (CHN) | 2:07.45 WC | Tes Schouten (NED) | 2:22.13 WC |
| Athens | Qin Haiyang (CHN) | 2:08.05 | Tes Schouten (NED) | 2:23.23 |
| Budapest | Qin Haiyang (CHN) | 2:07.32 WC | Tes Schouten (NED) | 2:21.52 WC |

=== 50 m butterfly ===
| Meet | Men | | Women | |
| Meet | Winner | Time | Winner | Time |
|---|---|---|---|---|
| Berlin | Ben Armbruster (AUS) | 23.08 | Sarah Sjöström (SWE) | 25.06 WC |
| Athens | Abdelrahman Sameh (EGY) | 23.04 | Sarah Sjöström (SWE) | 24.97 WC |
| Budapest | Michael Andrew (USA) | 23.11 | Sarah Sjöström (SWE) | 25.21 |

=== 100 m butterfly ===
| Meet | Men | | Women | |
| Meet | Winner | Time | Winner | Time |
|---|---|---|---|---|
| Berlin | Michael Andrew (USA) | 51.66 | Zhang Yufei (CHN) | 56.74 |
| Athens | Matthew Sates (RSA) | 51.82 | Zhang Yufei (CHN) | 56.06 WC |
| Budapest | Noè Ponti (SUI) | 51.38 | Zhang Yufei (CHN) | 56.13 |

=== 200 m butterfly ===
| Meet | Men | | Women | |
| Meet | Winner | Time | Winner | Time |
|---|---|---|---|---|
| Berlin | Matthew Sates (RSA) | 1:55.87 | Zhang Yufei (CHN) | 2:07.11 |
| Athens | Matthew Sates (RSA) | 1:55.44 | Zhang Yufei (CHN) | 2:06.73 |
| Budapest | Matthew Sates (RSA) | 1:55.25 | Zhang Yufei (CHN) | 2:05.65 WC |

=== 200 m individual medley ===
| Meet | Men | | Women | |
| Meet | Winner | Time | Winner | Time |
|---|---|---|---|---|
| Berlin | Matthew Sates (RSA) | 1:58.01 | Kaylee McKeown (AUS) | 2:10.76 |
| Athens | Matthew Sates (RSA) | 1:58.86 | Sydney Pickrem (CAN) | 2:09.67 |
| Budapest | Matthew Sates (RSA) | 1:57.72 | Marrit Steenbergen (NED) | 2:11.33 |

=== 400 m individual medley ===
| Meet | Men | | Women | |
| Meet | Winner | Time | Winner | Time |
|---|---|---|---|---|
| Berlin | Brendon Smith (AUS) | 4:13.59 | Katie Grimes (USA) | 4:37.20 |
| Athens | Kaito Tabuchi (JPN) | 4:13.30 | Katie Grimes (USA) | 4:38.74 |
| Budapest | Matthew Sates (RSA) | 4:15.68 | Boglárka Kapás (HUN) | 4:43.14 |

=== 4 × 100 m freestyle relay ===
| Meet | Men | | Women | |
| Meet | Winner | Time | Winner | Time |
|---|---|---|---|---|
| Berlin | | | Australia; Leah Neale; Alexandria Perkins; Bronte Campbell; Cate Campbell | 3:38.44 |
| Budapest | Australia; Maximillian Giuliani; Cody Simpson; Dylan Andrea; Zac Incerti | 3:14.54 | | |

=== 4 × 200 m freestyle relay ===
| Meet | Men | | Women | |
| Meet | Winner | Time | Winner | Time |
|---|---|---|---|---|
| Berlin | | | Hungary; Ajna Késely; Nikolett Pádár; Eszter Szabó-Feltóthy; Panna Ugrai | 8:04.00 |
| Budapest | Australia; Brendon Smith; Samuel Short; Maximillian Giuliani; Zac Incerti | 7:13.97 | | |

=== 4 × 100 m medley relay ===
| Meet | Men | | Women | | Mixed | |
| Meet | Winner | Time | Winner | Time | Winner | Time |
|---|---|---|---|---|---|---|
| Athens | Japan; Ryosuke Irie; Taku Taniguchi; Naoki Mizunuma; Shinri Shioura | 3:36.09 | Australia; Kaylee McKeown; Jenna Strauch; Alexandria Perkins; Cate Campbell | 4:00.67 | Australia; Joshua Edwards-Smith; Jenna Strauch; Shaun Champion; Bronte Campbell | 3:48.18 |
