= 2017 FINA Swimming World Cup =

The 2017 FINA Swimming World Cup was a series of eight two-day meets in eight cities between August and November 2017. This edition was held in the usual short-course (25-meter pool) format. Like the previous short course World Cup in 2016, 36 events were scheduled.

== Meets ==
The 2017 World Cup consisted of the following eight meets, which were divided into three clusters. Eindhoven returned after having been omitted for the last two editions, while Paris and Dubai were dropped in comparison to the previous year. The other seven cities were the same as the previous year.

Cluster	Meet	Dates	Location	Venue	Results
Europe	1	2–3 August	Moscow, Russia	Olimpiysky Sports Complex	
Europe	2	6–7 August	Berlin, Germany	SSE (in German)	
Europe	3	11–12 August	Eindhoven, the Netherlands	Pieter van den Hoogenband Zwemstadion (in Dutch)	
Asia 1	4	30 September–1 October	Hong Kong	Victoria Park Swimming Pool	
Asia 1	5	4–5 October	Doha, Qatar	Hamad Aquatic Centre	
Asia 2	6	10–11 November	Beijing, China	Beijing National Aquatics Center	
Asia 2	7	14–15 November	Tokyo, Japan	Tokyo Tatsumi International Swimming Center	
Asia 2	8	18–19 November	Singapore	OCBC Aquatic Centre	

== World Cup standings ==
- Composition of points:
  - Best performances (by meets): 1st place: 24 points, 2nd place: 18 points and 3rd place: 12 points;
  - Points for medals (in individual events): gold medal: 12 points, silver medal: 9 points and bronze medal: 6 points;
  - Bonus for world record (WR): 20 points.

=== Men ===
Rank	Name	Nationality	Points awarded (Bonus)								Total
Rank	Name	Nationality	RUS	GER	NED	HKG	QAT	CHN	JPN	SIN	Total
1	Chad le Clos	South Africa	36	63	60	75	78	48	42	45	447
2	Vladimir Morozov	Russia	24	24	45	45	51	48	36	60	333
3	Kirill Prigoda	Russia	36	27	30	42	66	9	18	42	270
4	Tom Shields	United States	12	27	33	75	39	0	–	–	186
5	Cameron van der Burgh	South Africa	36	21	12	42	42	–	–	–	153
6	Daiya Seto	Japan	–	–	–	–	–	36	48	30	114
7	Christian Diener	Germany	15	6	18	24	36	6	0	0	105
8	Ilya Shymanovich	Belarus	30	6	6	21	21	6	6	9	105
9	Pavel Sankovich	Belarus	12	6	12	18	15	9	9	12	93
10	Masaki Kaneko	Japan	15	18	18	–	–	0	18	12	81

=== Women ===
Rank	Name	Nationality	Points awarded (Bonus)								Total
Rank	Name	Nationality	RUS	GER	NED	HKG	QAT	CHN	JPN	SIN	Total
1	Sarah Sjöström	Sweden	109	60	97	87	93	69	63	51	629
2	Katinka Hosszú	Hungary	57	80	39	96	87	45	42	36	482
3	Ranomi Kromowidjojo	Netherlands	36	65	21	33	27	45	45	27	289
4	Emily Seebohm	Australia	36	21	21	42	54	36	30	42	282
5	Alia Atkinson	Jamaica	24	30	36	30	33	24	9	24	210
6	Mireia Belmonte	Spain	27	21	74	–	–	–	–	–	122
7	Rikke Pedersen	Denmark	12	9	6	27	30	6	12	15	117
8	Cate Campbell	Australia	12	6	6	–	–	27	15	42	108
9	Femke Heemskerk	Netherlands	0	6	6	51	39	–	–	–	102
10	Zhang Yufei	China	–	–	–	21	21	21	6	12	81

== Event winners ==
To limit the length of the program, each individual event was held in two meets in each cluster. The mixed relays were swum in each meet.

=== 50 m freestyle ===
Meet	Men			Women		
Meet	Winner	Nationality	Time	Winner	Nationality	Time
Moscow	Vladimir Morozov	Russia	20.93	Sarah Sjöström	Sweden	23.10 WR
Berlin				Ranomi Kromowidjojo	Netherlands	22.93 WR
Eindhoven	Vladimir Morozov	Russia	20.79			
Hong Kong	Vladimir Morozov	Russia	20.91	Sarah Sjöström	Sweden	23.42
Doha	Vladimir Morozov	Russia	20.98	Sarah Sjöström	Sweden	23.28
Beijing	Vladimir Morozov	Russia	20.83	Sarah Sjöström	Sweden	23.40
Tokyo				Ranomi Kromowidjojo	Netherlands	23.29
Singapore	Vladimir Morozov	Russia	20.61			

=== 100 m freestyle ===
Meet	Men			Women		
Meet	Winner	Nationality	Time	Winner	Nationality	Time
Moscow				Sarah Sjöström	Sweden	50.77 WR
Berlin	Vladimir Morozov	Russia	45.23 WC			
Eindhoven	Chad le Clos	South Africa	45.96	Sarah Sjöström	Sweden	50.58 WR
Hong Kong	Vladimir Morozov	Russia	45.91	Sarah Sjöström	Sweden	51.99
Doha	Vladimir Morozov	Russia	46.87	Sarah Sjöström	Sweden	51.62
Beijing				Sarah Sjöström	Sweden	51.25
Tokyo	Vladimir Morozov	Russia	45.65			
Singapore	Vladimir Morozov	Russia	45.56	Cate Campbell	Australia	50.85

=== 200 m freestyle ===
Meet	Men			Women		
Meet	Winner	Nationality	Time	Winner	Nationality	Time
Moscow	Chad le Clos	South Africa	1:42.54			
Berlin	Dominik Kozma	Hungary	1:41.03	Sarah Sjöström	Sweden	1:51.56
Eindhoven				Sarah Sjöström	Sweden	1:50.43 WR
Hong Kong	Chad le Clos	South Africa	1:42.88	Sarah Sjöström	Sweden	1:51.77
Doha	Chad le Clos	South Africa	1:44.40	Sarah Sjöström	Sweden	1:52.00
Beijing	Chad le Clos	South Africa	1:41.81			
Tokyo	Cameron McEvoy	Australia	1:43.37	Sarah Sjöström	Sweden	1:52.94
Singapore				Sarah Sjöström	Sweden	1:51.63

=== 400 m freestyle ===
Meet	Men			Women		
Meet	Winner	Nationality	Time	Winner	Nationality	Time
Moscow	Aleksandr Krasnykh	Russia	3:38.55	Federica Pellegrini	Italy	3:57.80
Berlin				Mireia Belmonte	Spain	3:57.79
Eindhoven	Aleksandr Krasnykh	Russia	3:38.35			
Hong Kong	Gabriele Detti	Italy	3:43.11	Femke Heemskerk	Netherlands	4:04.30
Doha	Gabriele Detti	Italy	3:42.57	Wang Jianjiahe	China	4:02.43
Beijing	Ji Xinjie	China	3:39.20	Wang Jianjiahe	China	3:59.69 WJR
Tokyo				Li Bingjie	China	3:59.14 WJR
Singapore	Péter Bernek	Hungary	3:39.36			

=== 1500 m (men)/800 m (women) freestyle ===
Meet	Men (1500 m)			Women (800 m)		
Meet	Winner	Nationality	Time	Winner	Nationality	Time
Moscow				Mireia Belmonte	Spain	8:07.10
Berlin	Gabriele Detti	Italy	14:18.33			
Eindhoven	Henrik Christiansen	Norway	14:26.48	Mireia Belmonte	Spain	8:07.47
Hong Kong	Qiu Ziao	China	14:44.09	Li Bingjie	China	8:27.89
Doha	Gergely Gyurta	Hungary	14:41.84	Wang Jianjiahe	China	8:15.35 WJR
Beijing				Wang Jianjiahe	China	8:12.30 WJR
Tokyo	Mykhailo Romanchuk	Ukraine	14:28.26			
Singapore	Gergely Gyurta	Hungary	14:33.89	Li Bingjie	China	8:12.36

=== 50 m backstroke ===
Meet	Men			Women		
Meet	Winner	Nationality	Time	Winner	Nationality	Time
Moscow	Pavel Sankovich	Belarus	23.20	Emily Seebohm	Australia	26.35
Berlin				Emily Seebohm	Australia	26.15
Eindhoven	Pavel Sankovich	Belarus	22.84			
Hong Kong	Pavel Sankovich	Belarus	23.03	Katinka Hosszú	Hungary	26.24
Doha	Christian Diener	Germany	23.58	Emily Seebohm	Australia	26.29
Beijing	Xu Jiayu	China	23.09	Emily Seebohm	Australia	26.28
Tokyo				Emily Seebohm	Australia	26.24
Singapore	Pavel Sankovich	Belarus	22.82			

=== 100 m backstroke ===
Meet	Men			Women		
Meet	Winner	Nationality	Time	Winner	Nationality	Time
Moscow				Katinka Hosszú	Hungary	55.65
Berlin	Radosław Kawęcki	Poland	49.97			
Eindhoven	Masaki Kaneko	Japan	49.65	Emily Seebohm	Australia	56.00
Hong Kong	Christian Diener	Germany	51.44	Katinka Hosszú	Hungary	56.20
Doha	Christian Diener	Germany	51.00	Katinka Hosszú	Hungary	56.27
Beijing				Katinka Hosszú	Hungary	56.34
Tokyo	Xu Jiayu	China	49.82			
Singapore	Ryosuke Irie	Japan	49.88	Emily Seebohm	Australia	56.23

=== 200 m backstroke ===
Meet	Men			Women		
Meet	Winner	Nationality	Time	Winner	Nationality	Time
Moscow	Radosław Kawęcki	Poland	1:48.96			
Berlin	Radosław Kawęcki	Poland	1:48.20	Katinka Hosszú	Hungary	2:00.37
Eindhoven				Katinka Hosszú	Hungary	2:00.05
Hong Kong	Christian Diener	Germany	1:51.25	Katinka Hosszú	Hungary	2:03.14
Doha	Christian Diener	Germany	1:50.96	Katinka Hosszú	Hungary	2:02.06
Beijing	Ryosuke Irie	Japan	1:50.24			
Tokyo	Masaki Kaneko	Japan	1:49.74	Emily Seebohm	Australia	2.01.98
Singapore				Emily Seebohm	Australia	2.01.41

=== 50 m breaststroke ===
Meet	Men			Women		
Meet	Winner	Nationality	Time	Winner	Nationality	Time
Moscow				Alia Atkinson	Jamaica	29.46
Berlin	Cameron van der Burgh	South Africa	25.49			
Eindhoven	Cameron van der Burgh	South Africa	25.63	Alia Atkinson	Jamaica	28.84
Hong Kong	Cameron van der Burgh	South Africa	25.80	Alia Atkinson	Jamaica	29.26
Doha	Cameron van der Burgh	South Africa	25.70	Alia Atkinson	Jamaica	29.42
Beijing				Alia Atkinson	Jamaica	29.57
Tokyo	Yasuhiro Koseki	Japan	26.06			
Singapore	Kirill Prigoda	Russia	25.80	Alia Atkinson	Jamaica	29.29

=== 100 m breaststroke ===
Meet	Men			Women		
Meet	Winner	Nationality	Time	Winner	Nationality	Time
Moscow	Cameron van der Burgh	South Africa	56.30			
Berlin	Kirill Prigoda	Russia	56.35	Alia Atkinson	Jamaica	1:03.16
Eindhoven				Alia Atkinson	Jamaica	1:02.67
Hong Kong	Cameron van der Burgh	South Africa	56.43	Alia Atkinson	Jamaica	1:04.09
Doha	Cameron van der Burgh	South Africa	56.11	Alia Atkinson	Jamaica	1:04.21
Beijing	Yasuhiro Koseki	Japan	56.75			
Tokyo	Yasuhiro Koseki	Japan	56.49	Yuliya Yefimova	Russia	1:03.90
Singapore				Alia Atkinson	Jamaica	1:03.79

=== 200 m breaststroke ===
Meet	Men			Women		
Meet	Winner	Nationality	Time	Winner	Nationality	Time
Moscow	Kirill Prigoda	Russia	2:02.16	Rikke Pedersen	Denmark	2:19.84
Berlin				Alia Atkinson	Jamaica	2:18.96
Eindhoven	Kirill Prigoda	Russia	2:02.15			
Hong Kong	Kirill Prigoda	Russia	2:04.02	Kierra Smith	Canada	2:18.48
Doha	Kirill Prigoda	Russia	2:01.24	Rikke Pedersen	Denmark	2:18.86
Beijing	Yasuhiro Koseki	Japan	2:03.43	Alia Atkinson	Jamaica	2:19.58
Tokyo				Rikke Pedersen	Denmark	2:18.29
Singapore	Kirill Prigoda	Russia	2:01.18			

=== 50 m butterfly ===
Meet	Men			Women		
Meet	Winner	Nationality	Time	Winner	Nationality	Time
Moscow	Chad le Clos	South Africa	22.31			
Berlin	Chad le Clos	South Africa	22.32	Sarah Sjöström	Sweden	24.57
Eindhoven				Ranomi Kromowidjojo	Netherlands	24.54
Hong Kong	Chad le Clos	South Africa	22.52	Sarah Sjöström	Sweden	24.62
Doha	Chad le Clos	South Africa	22.45	Sarah Sjöström	Sweden	24.76
Beijing	Chad le Clos	South Africa	22.22			
Tokyo	Chad le Clos	South Africa	22.49	Sarah Sjöström	Sweden	24.65
Singapore				Sarah Sjöström	Sweden	24.61

=== 100 m butterfly ===
Meet	Men			Women		
Meet	Winner	Nationality	Time	Winner	Nationality	Time
Moscow	Chad le Clos	South Africa	49.13	Sarah Sjöström	Sweden	55.70
Berlin				Katinka Hosszú	Hungary	55.86
Eindhoven	Chad le Clos	South Africa	49.09			
Hong Kong	Chad le Clos	South Africa	50.28	Sarah Sjöström	Sweden	55.32
Doha	Chad le Clos	South Africa	50.17	Sarah Sjöström	Sweden	55.55
Beijing	Chad le Clos	South Africa	49.18	Sarah Sjöström	Sweden	55.60
Tokyo				Sarah Sjöström	Sweden	55.07 WC
Singapore	Chad le Clos	South Africa	49.49			

=== 200 m butterfly ===
Meet	Men			Women		
Meet	Winner	Nationality	Time	Winner	Nationality	Time
Moscow				Franziska Hentke	Germany	2:03.43
Berlin	Chad le Clos	South Africa	1:49.08			
Eindhoven	Chad le Clos	South Africa	1:48.67	Mireia Belmonte	Spain	2:03.02
Hong Kong	Tom Shields	United States	1:49.62	Zhang Yufei	China	2:08.64
Doha	Chad le Clos	South Africa	1:49.59	Zhang Yufei	China	2:07.43
Beijing				Zhang Yufei	China	2:05.02
Tokyo	Chad le Clos	South Africa	1:50.71			
Singapore	Chad le Clos	South Africa	1:49.25	Zhang Yufei	China	2:04.22

=== 100 m individual medley ===
Meet	Men			Women		
Meet	Winner	Nationality	Time	Winner	Nationality	Time
Moscow	Vladimir Morozov	Russia	51.04	Katinka Hosszú	Hungary	57.02
Berlin				Katinka Hosszú	Hungary	56.51 WR
Eindhoven	Vladimir Morozov	Russia	50.70			
Hong Kong	Vladimir Morozov	Russia	51.64	Katinka Hosszú	Hungary	56.97
Doha	Vladimir Morozov	Russia	51.38	Katinka Hosszú	Hungary	57.26
Beijing	Vladimir Morozov	Russia	50.36	Katinka Hosszú	Hungary	57.50
Tokyo				Katinka Hosszú	Hungary	57.38
Singapore	Vladimir Morozov	Russia	50.49			

=== 200 m individual medley ===
Meet	Men			Women		
Meet	Winner	Nationality	Time	Winner	Nationality	Time
Moscow				Katinka Hosszú	Hungary	2:04.76
Berlin	Philip Heintz	Germany	1:52.64			
Eindhoven	Philip Heintz	Germany	1:53.23	Katinka Hosszú	Hungary	2:05.01
Hong Kong	Kirill Prigoda	Russia	1:54.81	Katinka Hosszú	Hungary	2:05.29
Doha	Kirill Prigoda	Russia	1:55.57	Katinka Hosszú	Hungary	2:05.29
Beijing				Katinka Hosszú	Hungary	2:04.64
Tokyo	Daiya Seto	Japan	1:51.40			
Singapore	Daiya Seto	Japan	1:51.88	Katinka Hosszú	Hungary	2:04.37

=== 400 m individual medley ===
Meet	Men			Women		
Meet	Winner	Nationality	Time	Winner	Nationality	Time
Moscow	Philip Heintz	Germany	4:04.49			
Berlin	Philip Heintz	Germany	4:05.16	Katinka Hosszú	Hungary	4:19.82 WC
Eindhoven				Mireia Belmonte	Spain	4:18.94 WR
Hong Kong	Ayrton Sweeney	South Africa	4:07.76	Katinka Hosszú	Hungary	4:33.55
Doha	Maksym Shemberev	Azerbaijan	4:06.72	Katinka Hosszú	Hungary	4:27.94
Beijing	Daiya Seto	Japan	3:58.20 WC			
Tokyo	Daiya Seto	Japan	3:57.66 WC	Katinka Hosszú	Hungary	4:22.05
Singapore				Katinka Hosszú	Hungary	4:25.88

=== 4 × 50 m mixed relays ===
Meet	4 × 50 m mixed freestyle			4 × 50 m mixed medley		
Meet	Winners	Nationality	Time	Winners	Nationality	Time
Moscow	Vladimir Morozov; Sergei Fesikov; Rozaliya Nasretdinova; Veronika Popova	Russia	1:31.39	Vladimir Morozov; Kirill Prigoda; Svetlana Chimrova; Veronika Popova	Russia	1:39.10
Berlin	Thom de Boer; Ranomi Kromowidjojo; Femke Heemskerk; Jesse Puts	Netherlands	1:28.70	Jesse Puts; Arno Kamminga; Maaike de Waard; Ranomi Kromowidjojo	Netherlands	1:38.41
Eindhoven	Jesse Puts; Thom de Boer; Femke Heemskerk; Ranomi Kromowidjojo	Netherlands	1:28.90	Maaike de Waard; Arno Kamminga; Ranomi Kromowidjojo; Thom de Boer	Netherlands	1:39.34
Hong Kong	Thom de Boer; Kyle Stolk; Femke Heemskerk; Ranomi Kromowidjojo	Netherlands	1:32.11	Maaike de Waard; Arno Kamminga; Ranomi Kromowidjojo; Thom de Boer	Netherlands	1:40.75
Doha	Thom de Boer; Kyle Stolk; Maaike de Waard; Ranomi Kromowidjojo	Netherlands	1:32.20	Maaike de Waard; Arno Kamminga; Ranomi Kromowidjojo; Thom de Boer	Netherlands	1:40.92
Beijing	Cameron McEvoy; Alexander Graham; Bronte Campbell; Cate Campbell	Australia	1:30.81	Xu Jiayu; Yan Zibei; Zhang Yufei; Liu Xiang	China	1:39.10
Tokyo	Cameron McEvoy; Louis Townsend; Bronte Campbell; Cate Campbell	Australia	1:29.97	William Stockwell; Matthew Wilson; Emily Seebohm; Cate Campbell	Australia	1:39.05
Singapore	Cameron McEvoy; Louis Townsend; Bronte Campbell; Cate Campbell	Australia	1:29.34	Bobby Hurley; Matthew Wilson; Emma McKeon; Cate Campbell	Australia	1:38.65

Legend: WR – World record; WJR – World Junior record; WC – World Cup record
