= World Aquatics Swimming World Cup =

International swimming tournament

Swimming World Cup
- Status: Active
- Genre: Sports event
- Date: Midyear
- Frequency: Annual
- Inaugurated: 1988
- Most recent: 2026
- Organiser: World Aquatics
- Website: World Aquatics

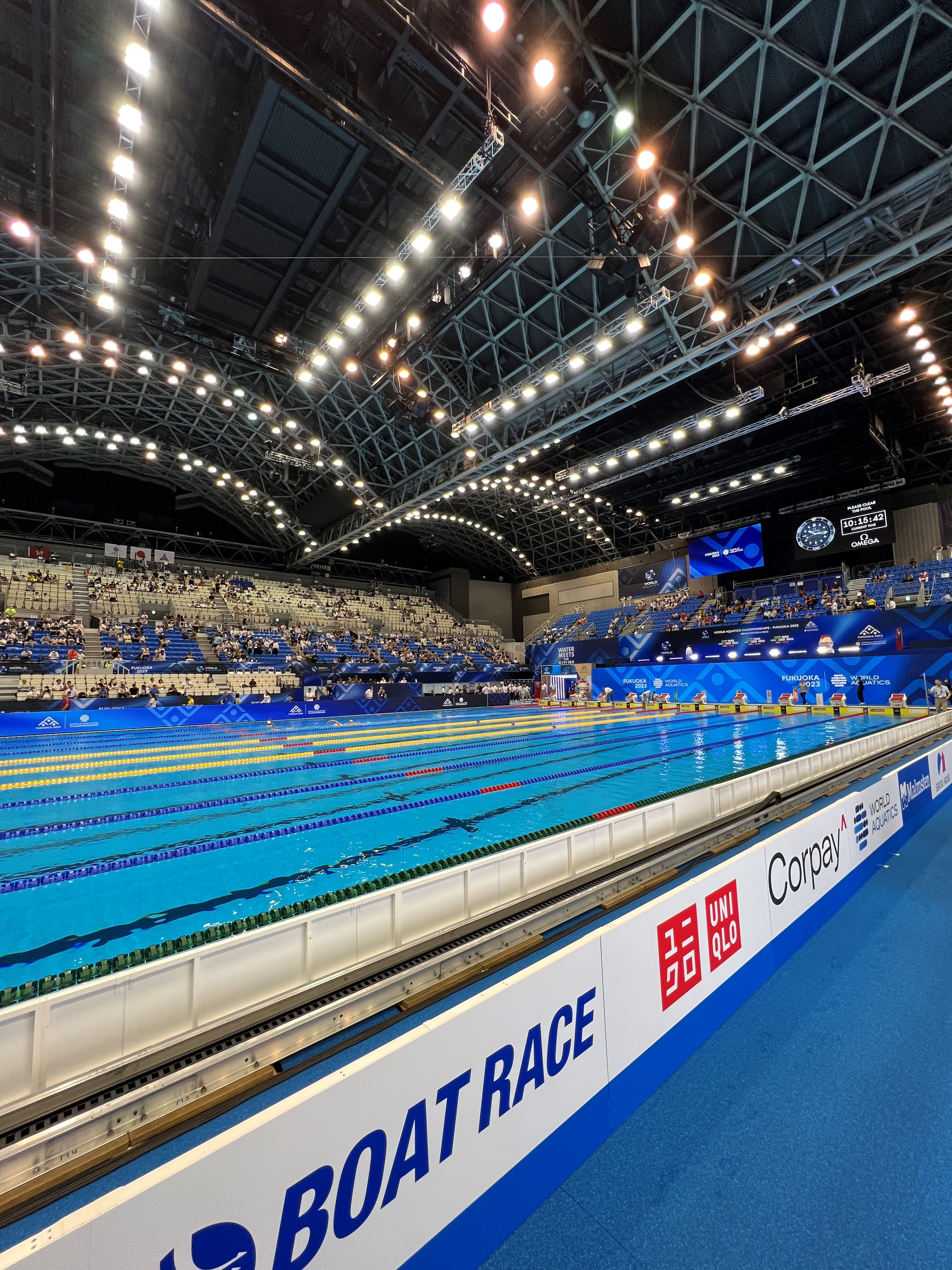
Marine Messe Hall A, Swimming & Artistic Swimming Venue, Fukuoka, 2023.

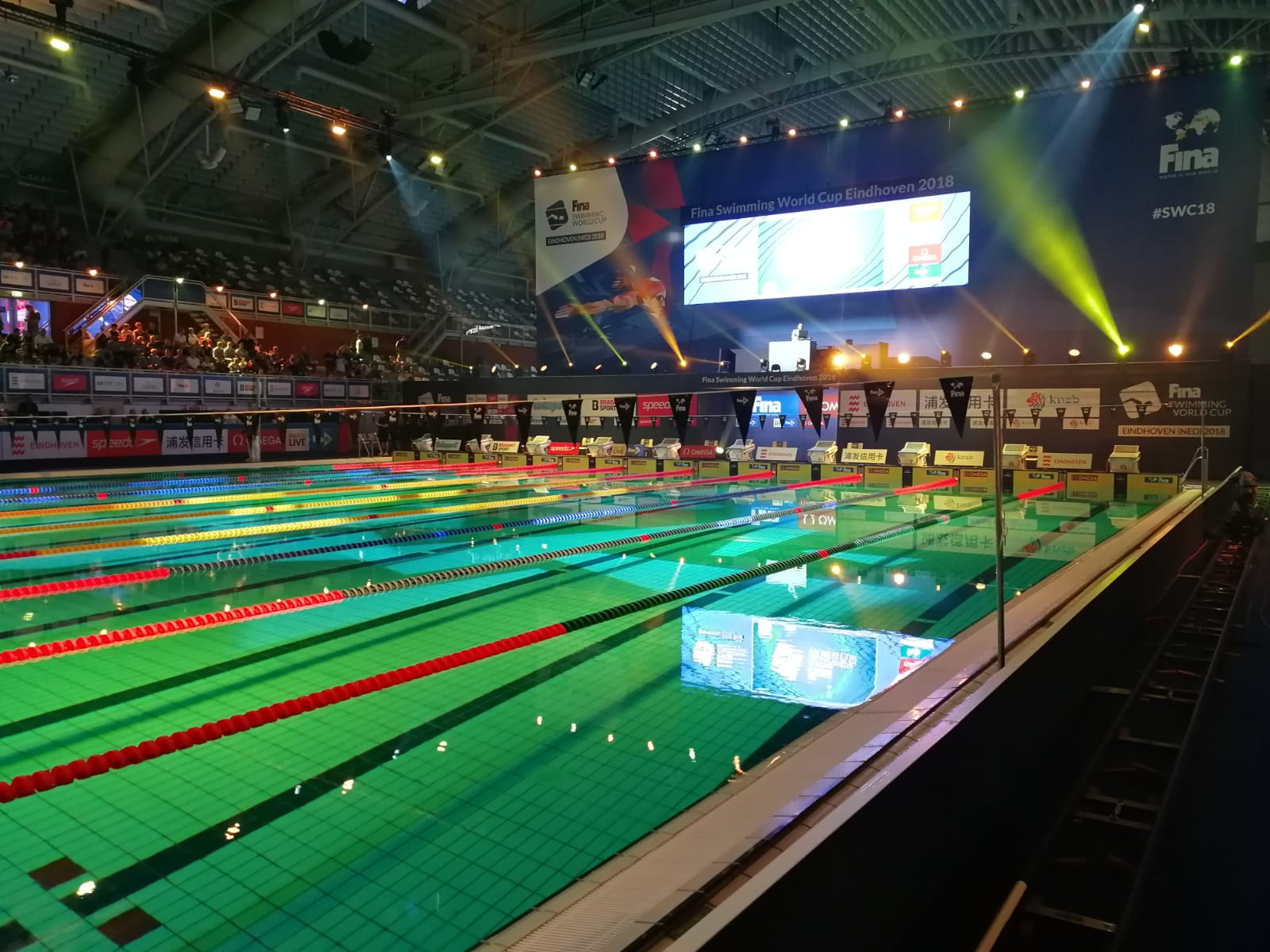
The venue for the FINA Swimming World Cup in Eindhoven before start of the event.

The World Aquatics Swimming World Cup (formerly known as the FINA Swimming World Cup) is an international series of swimming meets organized by World Aquatics (the international governing body formerly known as FINA).

== History ==
In 1979, FINA (now known as World Aquatics) launched the Swimming World Cup, the first edition was held in Tokyo with multiple winners.

Since 1988, the World Aquatics Swimming World Cup is staged between August and November every year and attracts a high level of athletes due to the considerable prize money on offer. The event is traditionally held in short course (25m pool) format, with a switch to long course (50m pool) format in pre-Olympics years.

Prior to the COVID hiatus in 2020 the event was being held in three clusters, totaling seven three day meets across seven different locations with prize money reaching US$2.5 million. The event resumed in 2021 as four meets each of three days duration, and the 2023 edition was staged as three meets each of three days duration.

The event is popular with prominent swimmers due to the prize money on offer. In 2022, a total of US$1.2 million was awarded. For each meet the top 20 male and female athletes shared US$224,000 prize money ($112,000 per gender). At the end of the meet series an additional US$262,000 per gender was awarded to the top eight men and women athletes based on their overall ranking using a point score incorporating placings and performance.

The 2023 event is notable for a number of reasons including a switch to long course (50m) format as a pre-Olympics year event, the event acting as a qualifying meet for both the forthcoming World Aquatics Championships in 2024 and Olympic Games in 2024, and the introduction of an "open" category in 50m and 100m events for transgender swimmers. The "open" category however was shelved as there were no entries. From this edition onwards, the SWC will be held on one continent, with different cities in each country.

== Events ==
Traditionally the events are the same for all meets but the competition order may vary, although this has varied from the 2021 resumption of the meet. All events are swum prelims/finals, with the exception of the 800m freestyle and 1500m freestyle which are swum as timed finals (fastest heat in the finals session). The meets are held over two or three days, with preliminary heats in the morning and finals in the evening. A noted exception to this style are the meets held in Brazil, where prelims have been in the evening with finals the following morning.

On most years, the races are held in short course pools, the exception recently being the season leading up to an Olympic year where events are swum in long course venues.

Current 2023 series events (to be swum in 50m pools):

- Freestyle: 50, 100, 200, 400, 800, and 1500
- Backstroke: 50, 100 and 200
- Breaststroke: 50, 100 and 200
- Butterfly: 50, 100 and 200
- Individual medley: 200, and 400
- Relays: 4 × 100 m freestyle (men and women), 4 x 200m freestyle (men and women), 4 × 100 m medley (men, women and mixed)

An 'open' category was created in 2023 after World Aquatics announced that trans women were banned from competing in the women's category if they had "experienced any part of male puberty beyond tanner stage two, or before [the] age [of] 12, whichever is later". The category was shelved after receiving "no entries".

== Winners ==
One stage in 1979.

| Season | | Name | Nationality |
1988–89
| 1988–89 | men | Winners in six events | |
| 1988–89 | women | Winners in six events | |
1989–90
| 1989–90 | men | Winners in six events | |
| 1989–90 | women | Winners in six events | |
1991
| 1991 | men | Winners in six events | |
| 1991 | women | Winners in six events | |
1991–92
| 1991–92 | men | Winners in six events | |
| 1991–92 | women | Winners in six events | |
1993
| 1993 | men | Winners in six events | |
| 1993 | women | Winners in six events | |
1994
| 1994 | men | Winners in six events | |
| 1994 | women | Winners in six events | |
1995
| 1995 | men | Winners in six events | |
| 1995 | women | Winners in six events | |
1996
| 1996 | men | Winners in six events | |
| 1996 | women | Winners in six events | |
1997
| 1997 | men | Winners in six events | |
| 1997 | women | Winners in six events | |
1998
| 1998 | men | Winners in six events | |
| 1998 | women | Winners in six events | |
1998–99
| 1998–99 | men | Winners in six events | |
| 1998–99 | women | Winners in six events | |
1999–2000
| 1999–2000 | men | Winners in 17 events | |
| 1999–2000 | women | Winners in 17 events | |
2000–01
| 2000–01 | men | Winners in 13 events | |
| 2000–01 | women | Winners in 11 events | |
2001–02
| 2001–02 | men | Ed Moses | United States |
| 2001–02 | women | Martina Moravcová | Slovakia |
2002–03
| 2002–03 | men | Thomas Rupprath | Germany |
| 2002–03 | women | Alison Sheppard | Great Britain |
2003–04
| 2003–04 | men | Ed Moses (2) | United States |
| 2003–04 | women | Martina Moravcová (2) | Slovakia (2) |
2004–05
| 2004–05 | men | Ryk Neethling | South Africa |
| 2004–05 | women | Anna-Karin Kammerling | Sweden |
2005–06
| 2005–06 | men | Ryk Neethling (2) | South Africa |
| 2005–06 | women | Therese Alshammar | Sweden |
2007
| 2007 | men | Randall Bal | United States |
| 2007 | women | Therese Alshammar | Sweden |
2008
| 2008 | men | Cameron van der Burgh | South Africa |
| 2008 | women | Marieke Guehrer | Australia |
2009
| 2009 | men | Cameron van der Burgh | South Africa |
| 2009 | women | Jessica Hardy | United States |
2010
| 2010 | men | Thiago Pereira | Brazil |
| 2010 | women | Therese Alshammar | Sweden |
2011
| 2011 | men | Chad le Clos | South Africa |
| 2011 | women | Therese Alshammar (4) | Sweden |
2012
| 2012 | men | Kenneth To | Australia |
| 2012 | women | Katinka Hosszú | Hungary |
2013
| 2013 | men | Chad le Clos | South Africa |
| 2013 | women | Katinka Hosszú | Hungary |
2014
| 2014 | men | Chad le Clos | South Africa |
| 2014 | women | Katinka Hosszú | Hungary |
2015
| 2015 | men | Cameron van der Burgh (3) | South Africa |
| 2015 | women | Katinka Hosszú | Hungary |
2016
| 2016 | men | Vladimir Morozov | Russia |
| 2016 | women | Katinka Hosszú (5) | Hungary |
2017
| 2017 | men | Chad le Clos (4) | South Africa |
| 2017 | women | Sarah Sjöström | Sweden |
2018
| 2018 | men | Vladimir Morozov | Russia |
| 2018 | women | Sarah Sjöström (2) | Sweden (7) |
2019
| 2019 | men | Vladimir Morozov (3) | Russia (3) |
| 2019 | women | Cate Campbell | Australia |
2021
| 2021 | men | Matthew Sates | South Africa |
| 2021 | women | Emma McKeon | Australia |
2022
| 2022 | men | Dylan Carter | Trinidad and Tobago |
| 2022 | women | Beata Nelson | United States |
2023
| 2023 | men | Qin Haiyang | China |
| 2023 | women | Kaylee McKeown | Australia (5) |
2024
| 2024 | men | Léon Marchand | France |
| 2024 | women | Kate Douglass | United States |
2025
| 2025 | men | Hubert Kós | Hungary (6) |
| 2025 | women | Kate Douglass (2) | United States (7) |
2026
| 2026 | men | Pieter Coetze | South Africa (11) |
| 2026 | women | Marrit Steenbergen | Netherlands |

== Venues ==
| Country | City | 88 89 | 89 90 | 91 | 91 92 | 93 | 94 | 95 | 96 | 97 | 98 | 98 99 | 99 00 | 00 01 | 01 02 | 02 03 | 03 04 | 04 05 | 05 06 | 07 | 08 | 09 | 10 | 11 | 12 | 13 | 14 | 15 | 16 | 17 | 18 | 19 | 21 | 22 | 23 | 24 | 25 | Total |
|---|---|---|---|---|---|---|---|---|---|---|---|---|---|---|---|---|---|---|---|---|---|---|---|---|---|---|---|---|---|---|---|---|---|---|---|---|---|---|
| Australia | Hobart | | | | | | | | | | | ● | ● | | | | | | | | | | | | | | | | | | | | | | | | | 2 |
| Australia | Melbourne | | | | | | | | | | | | | ● | ● | ● | ● | ● | | | | | | | | | | | | | | | | | | | | 5 |
| Australia | Sydney | | | | | | | | | | ● | ● | ● | | | | | | ● | ● | ● | | | | | | | | | | | | | | | | | 6 |
| Brazil | Belo Horizonte | | | | | | | | | | | | | | | | ● | ● | ● | ● | ● | | | | | | | | | | | | | | | | | 5 |
| Brazil | Rio de Janeiro | | | | | | | | | | ● | ● | ● | ● | ● | ● | | | | | | ~~●~~ | ● | | | | | | | | | | | | | | | 7 |
| Canada | Edmonton | | | | | | | | | | | ● | ● | ● | ● | | | | | | | | | | | | | | | | | | | | | | | 4 |
| Canada | Montreal | | ● | | ● | | | | | | | | | | | | | | | | | | | | | | | | | | | | | | | | | 2 |
| Canada | Toronto | ● | | | | | | | | | | | | | | | | | | | | | | | | | | | | | | | | ● | | | ● | 3 |
| Canada | Victoria | | | ● | | | | | | | | | | | | | | | | | | | | | | | | | | | | | | | | | | 1 |
| China | Beijing | | | | | ● | ● | | ● | ● | ● | ● | | | | | | | | | | | ● | ● | ● | ● | ● | ● | ● | ● | ● | | | | | | | 15 |
| China | Jinan | | | | | | | | | | | | | | | | | | | | | | | | | | | | | | | ● | | | | | | 1 |
| China | Shanghai | | | | | ● | | | | | | | ● | ● | ● | ● | | | | | | | | | | | | | | | | | | | | ● | | 6 |
| Finland | Espoo | | | | | | | ● | ● | ● | | | | | | | | | | | | | | | | | | | | | | | | | | | | 3 |
| France | Chartres-Paris | | | | | | | | | | | | | | | | | | | | | | | | | | | ● | ● | | | | | | | | | 2 |
| France | Paris | ● | ● | | ● | ● | ● | ● | ● | ● | ● | ● | ● | ● | ● | ● | | | | | | | | | | | | | | | | | | | | | | 14 |
| Germany | Berlin | ● | ● | | | | | | | | | | ● | ● | ● | ● | ● | ● | ● | ● | ● | ● | ● | ● | ● | ● | | | ● | ● | | ● | ● | ● | ● | | | 22 |
| Germany | Bonn | ● | ● | ● | ● | | | | | | | | | | | | | | | | | | | | | | | | | | | | | | | | | 5 |
| Germany | Gelsenkirchen | | | | | ● | ● | ● | ● | ● | ● | ● | | | | | | | | | | | | | | | | | | | | | | | | | | 7 |
| Germany | Rostock | | | ● | | | | | | | | | | | | | | | | | | | | | | | | | | | | | | | | | | 1 |
| Great Britain | Glasgow | | | | | | | | | ● | | | | | | | | | | | | | | | | | | | | | | | | | | | | 1 |
| Great Britain | Leicester | | ● | | ● | | | | | | | | | | | | | | | | | | | | | | | | | | | | | | | | | 2 |
| Great Britain | London | ● | | | | | | | | | | | | | | | | | | | | | | | | | | | | | | | | | | | | 1 |
| Great Britain | Sheffield | | | ● | | ● | ● | ● | ● | | ● | ● | ● | ● | | | | | | | | | | | | | | | | | | | | | | | | 9 |
| Greece | Athens | | | | | | | | | | | | | | | | | | | | | | | | | | | | | | | | | | ● | | | 1 |
| Hong Kong | Hong Kong | | | | | | ● | ● | ● | ● | ● | ● | ● | | | | | | | | | | | | | | ● | ● | ● | ● | | | | | | | | 11 |
| Hungary | Budapest | | | | | | | | | | | | | | | | | | | | | | | | | | | | | | ● | ● | ● | | ● | | | 4 |
| Italy | Desenzano | | ● | | | | ● | | | | | | | | | | | | | | | | | | | | | | | | | | | | | | | 2 |
| Italy | Imperia | | | | | | | | ● | ● | ● | ● | ● | ● | ● | | | | | | | | | | | | | | | | | | | | | | | 7 |
| Italy | Milan | | | ● | ● | ● | | | | | | | | | | | | | | | | | | | | | | | | | | | | | | | | 3 |
| Italy | Saint-Vincent | | | | | | | ● | | | | | | | | | | | | | | | | | | | | | | | | | | | | | | 1 |
| Italy | Venice | ● | | | | | | | | | | | | | | | | | | | | | | | | | | | | | | | | | | | | 1 |
| Japan | Tokyo | | | | | | | | | | | | | | | | | | | | | | ● | ● | ● | ● | ● | ● | ● | ● | ● | ● | | | | | | 10 |
| Netherlands | Eindhoven | | | | | | | | | | | | | | | | | | | | | | | | | ● | | | | ● | ● | | | | | | | 3 |
| Qatar | Doha | | | | | | | | | | | | | | | | | | | | | | | | ● | ● | ● | ● | ● | ● | ● | ● | ● | | | | | 9 |
| Russia | Moscow | | | | | | | | | | | | | | | | ● | ● | ● | ● | ● | ● | ● | ● | ● | ● | ● | ● | ● | ● | | | | | | | | 14 |
| Russia | Saint Petersburg | | | ● | ● | | | | | | | | | | | | | | | | | | | | | | | | | | | | | | | | | 2 |
| Russia | Kazan | | | | | | | | | | | | | | | | | | | | | | | | | | | | | | ● | ● | ● | | | | | 3 |
| Singapore | Singapore | | | | | | | | | | | | | | | | | | | ● | ● | ● | ● | ● | ● | ● | ● | ● | ● | ● | ● | ● | | | | ● | | 13 |
| South Africa | Durban | | | | | | | | | | | | | | | | ● | ● | ● | ● | ● | ● | | | | | | | | | | | | | | | | 6 |
| South Korea | Daejon | | | | | | | | | | | | | | | | ● | ● | ● | | | | | | | | | | | | | | | | | | | 3 |
| South Korea | Incheon | | | | | | | | | | | | | | | | | | | | | | | | | | | | | | | | | | | ● | | 1 |
| Spain | Palma de Mallorca | | | | ● | | | | | | | | | | | | | | | | | | | | | | | | | | | | | | | | | 1 |
| Sweden | Gothenburg | ● | ● | | | | | | | | | | | | | | | | | | | | ● | | | | | | | | | | | | | | | 3 |
| Sweden | Malmö | | | ● | ● | ● | ● | ● | ● | ● | ● | ● | ● | | | | | | | | | | | | | | | | | | | | | | | | | 10 |
| Sweden | Stockholm | | | | | | | | | | | | | ● | ● | ● | ● | ● | ● | ● | ● | ● | ● | ● | ● | | | | | | | | | | | | | 12 |
| United Arab Emirates | Dubai | | | | | | | | | | | | | | | | | | | | | | ● | | ● | ● | ● | ● | ● | | | | | | | | | 6 |
| United States | Carmel, IN | | | | | | | | | | | | | | | | | | | | | | | | | | | | | | | | | | | | ● | 1 |
| United States | College Station, TX | | | | | | | | | | | ● | | | | | | | | | | | | | | | | | | | | | | | | | | 1 |
| United States | Indianapolis, IN | ● | | | | | | | | | | | | | | | | | | | | | | | | | | | | | | | | ● | | | | 2 |
| United States | New York, NY (East Meadow) | | | | | | | | | | | | | | ● | ● | ● | ● | ● | | | | | | | | | | | | | | | | | | | 5 |
| United States | Orlando, FL | | ● | | | | | | | | | | | | | | | | | | | | | | | | | | | | | | | | | | | 1 |
| United States | Washington, D.C. | | | | | | | | | | | | ● | ● | | | | | | | | | | | | | | | | | | | | | | | | 2 |
| United States | Westmont, IL | | | | | | | | | | | | | | | | | | | | | | | | | | | | | | | | | | | | ● | 1 |
| Total | | 8 | 8 | 7 | 8 | 7 | 7 | 7 | 8 | 8 | 9 | 12 | 12 | 10 | 9 | 7 | 8 | 8 | 8 | 7 | 7 | 5 | 7 | 7 | 8 | 8 | 7 | 8 | 9 | 8 | 7 | 7 | 4 | 3 | 3 | 3 | 3 | |
