= Yuki Ikari =

Japanese swimmer (born 2000)

Personal information
- Nationality: Japan
- Born: 21 August 2000 (age 25) Okayama, Japan
- Height: 1.75 m (5 ft 9 in)

Sport
- Sport: Swimming
- Strokes: Individual medley
Medal record
Men's swimming
Representing Japan
Universiade
Gold medal – first place	2019 Naples	400 m medley

Yuki Ikari (井狩 裕貴, Ikari Yūki, born 21 August 2000) is a Japanese swimmer. He competed in the 2020 Summer Olympics.
