= Valery Bachin =

Russian swimming coach

Valery Petrovich Bachin
Current position
- Title: Head Coach, Swimming

Biographical details
- Born: July 20, 1963 (age 63); Russia Omsk
- Education: Siberian Academy of Physical Culture

Accomplishments and honors

Awards
- Honored Coach of Russia (1992)

Valery Petrovich Bachin (Russian: Валерий Петрович Бачин, romanized: Valery Petrovich Bachin; born July 20, 1963) is a Soviet and Russian swimming coach and educator. He holds the title of Honored Coach of Russia (1992). He also holds the title of Judge of the Republican Category and a PhD in Education (1990).

== Biography ==
Valery Bachin was born on July 20, 1963. He is a Master of Sports of the USSR. In 1984, he graduated from the Siberian Academy of Physical Culture with a degree in "Physical Education and Sport," receiving the qualification of "Physical Education Teacher and Swimming Coach."

Since 1986, he has been working at the Siberian Academy of Physical Culture, where he teaches two courses: "Professional Athletic Development and Sports Pedagogy." In 1994, he became an associate professor. Currently, he is a professor at the Department of Swimming Theory and Methodology.

Since 1995, Bachin has been working as a coach for the Russian national team and has long served as the director of the Omsk Regional Olympic Training Center for Swimming.

Some of his most accomplished athletes include:

- Yuri Mukhin — Olympic gold medalist (1992, 4×200 m freestyle relay), European champion (1993).
- Denis Pimankov — Silver medalist at the 1996 Summer Olympics, World champion (2003), two-time European champion (1997, 2000).
- Ivan Usov — World champion (2003).
- Dmitry Chernyshov — Two-time European champion (2000).
- Vladislav Aminov — European champion (2000).
- Sergey Makov - a former world record holder.

== Awards and honors ==
- Honored Coach of Russia (1992).
- Honorary Certificate from the Omsk Region Administration (2003).
- Honorary Badge "For Contribution to the Development of Physical Culture and Sports" (2022)

== Publications ==
- R. E. Rybin, G. D. Babushkin, V. P. Bachin. Pre-competition preparation of highly qualified swimmers. — Omsk Scientific Herald, 2015.
- G. D. Babushkin, R. E. Rybin, V. P. Bachin. Effectiveness of competitive activities for highly qualified sprinter swimmers and the factors affecting it. — Omsk Scientific Herald, 2015.
