= Daria Tsvetkova =

Russian swimmer

Personal information
- Full name: Daria Igorevna Tsvetkova
- Nationality: Russia
- Born: August 29, 1995 (age 31) Barnaul, Russia
- Years active: 2010–2016

Sport
- Sport: Butterfly stroke
- Club: Sports school "Ob" (Barnaul)
- Coach: A.B. Nazdrachev
Medal record
Women's swimming
European Championships (SC)
Silver medal – second place	2015 Netanya	4×50 m mixed medley relay
FINA Swimming World Cup
Gold medal – first place	2013 Moscow	4×50 m mixed medley relay
Silver medal – second place	2012 Moscow	4×50 m mixed medley relay
Bronze medal – third place	2012 Moscow	50 m butterfly
Bronze medal – third place	2016 Moscow	4×50 m mixed medley relay
Bronze medal – third place	2016 Moscow	50 m butterfly
Universiade
Silver medal – second place	2013 Kazan	4×100 m medley relay

Darya Igorevna Tsvetkova (Russian: Дарья Игоревна Цветкова; born August 29, 1995, Barnaul, Russia) is a Russian swimmer, a former world record holder in the 4×50m medley relay, and a multiple-time former Russian record holder. She holds the title of Master of Sports of Russia, International Class. She specializes in the butterfly stroke at distances of 50m and 100m, both individually and in relay events.

== Biography ==
Darya Tsvetkova was born on August 29, 1995, in Barnaul, Russia. She trained at Sports school "Ob" (Barnaul) under the guidance of coach Artyom Nazdrachev.

Since 2010, she has been a part of Russia's national swimming team

== Swimming career ==
In 2012, Tsvetkova won gold at the Russian Championships in the 50m butterfly and also became the Russian Short Course Champion.

=== 2013 FINA Swimming World Cup ===
In 2013, at the World Cup in Moscow, the Russian mixed 4×50m medley relay team, with Tsvetkova swimming the butterfly stroke leg, set a world record in the event.

She has won numerous medals at Russian national championships, both in individual and relay events.

=== 2015 European Short Course Championships ===
At the 2015 European Short Course Swimming Championships in Netanya, Israel, Tsvetkova and the Russian team won the qualification round in the 4×50m mixed medley relay, ahead of Italy and the Netherlands. In the final, Russia won silver, finishing just 0.03 seconds behind Italy.

In the individual 50m butterfly final, she set a new Russian record and placed seventh.

== Major achievements ==
- Master of Sports of Russia, International Class
- Former world record holder in the 4×50m mixed medley relay
- Silver medalist at the 2015 European Short Course Swimming Championships (4×50m mixed medley relay)
- Gold medalist at the 2013 FINA Swimming World Cup (4×50m mixed medley relay)
- Multiple-time champion and medalist at the Russian Championships and Russian Short Course Championships.

Records
Preceded by (United States); Dustin Rhodes (25.54); Andrew Marciniak (27.68); Hailey Gordon (27.81); Olivia Kabacinski (26.58); September 26, 2013 – 1:49.87	World Record – Mixed 4×50 m Medley Relay (Short Course) (Russia); Sergey Makov (23.98); Andrey Grechin (26.90); Daria Tsvetkova (25.97); Ekaterina Borovikova (24.85); September 28, 2013 – 1:47.61	Succeeded by (France); Jérémy Stravius (23.15); Giacomo Perez Dortona (26.41); Mélanie Henique (25.45); Anna Santamans (24.53); October 20, 2013 – 1:39.54
