= Sergey Makov =

Personal information
- Full name: Sergey Konstantinovich Makov
- Nationality: Russia
- Born: September 3, 1985 (age 40) Barnaul, Russia
- Years active: 2000–2013

Sport
- Sport: Backstroke
- Club: CSKA (Omsk)
- Coach: Valery Bachin; E.N. Saulina (first coach)
Medal record
Men's swimming
European Championships (SC)
Silver medal – second place	2011 Szczecin	4×50 m medley relay
FINA Swimming World Cup
Gold medal – first place	2013 Moscow	4×50 m mixed medley relay
Silver medal – second place	2005 Daejeon	50 m backstroke
Silver medal – second place	2011 Moscow	50 m backstroke
Silver medal – second place	2012 Moscow	4×50 m mixed medley relay
Bronze medal – third place	2011 Moscow	100 m backstroke
Universiade
Silver medal – second place	2011 Shenzhen	50 m backstroke

Sergey Konstantinovich Makov (Russian: Сергей Константинович Маков, romanized: Sergey Konstantinovich Makov; born September 3, 1985 (age 40) in Barnaul, Russia) is a Russian former competitive backstroke swimmer, Master of Sport of Russia, International Class, and a former member of the Russian national swimming team (2005–2013). He is a European Championships medalist and World Cup champion, as well as a former world record holder in the mixed medley relay.

== Career ==
Makov began swimming at the age of eight under coach E.N. Saulina. Later, he trained under Valery Bachin, an Honored Coach of Russia, and represented the Armed Forces (Omsk) team.

In 2013, Makov moved to Omsk to continue his career, and after retirement transitioned to coaching.

=== Achievements ===
- Master of Sports of Russia, International Class
- Former world record holder in the 4×50 m mixed medley relay
- Silver medalist at the 2011 European Short Course Swimming Championships in the 4×50 m medley relay.
- Champion and multiple medalist at the FINA Swimming World Cup stages:
  - Gold: Moscow 2013, 4×50 m mixed medley relay
  - Silver: Daejeon 2005, 50 m backstroke; Moscow 2011, 50 m backstroke; Moscow 2012, 4×50 m mixed medley relay
  - Bronze: Moscow 2011, 100 m backstroke
- Silver medalist at the 2011 Summer Universiade in the 50 m backstroke

At the Russian Championships:

- National champion:
  - 2004 – 50 m backstroke
  - 2006 — 4×100 m medley relay
- Multiple silver and bronze medalist in both long course and short course national championships (2004–2012)

=== Doping case ===
On 12 October 2013, Makov was suspended for two years by FINA for an anti-doping rule violation. A sample collected during the Moscow leg of the 2013 FINA World Cup tested positive for Ostarine, a selective androgen receptor modulator (SARM).

=== Masters competitions ===
After retiring from professional swimming, Makov began competing in the "Masters" category. He is a European and Russian record holder in his age group.

== Coaching career ==
In 2016, Makov founded the "Swim Master" swimming school in Omsk. In 2021, a branch of the school was opened in Pavlodar. Since its founding, the school has trained over 3,700 people, with more than 1,500 students engaged in regular training.

== Personal life ==
Makov is married and has a son. He resides in Omsk.

Records
Preceded by (United States); Dustin Rhodes (25.54); Andrew Marciniak (27.68); Hailey Gordon (27.81); Olivia Kabacinski (26.58); September 26, 2013 – 1:49.87	World Record – Mixed 4×50 m Medley Relay (Short Course) (Russia); Sergey Makov (23.98); Andrey Grechin (26.90); Daria Tsvetkova (25.97); Ekaterina Borovikova (24.85); September 28, 2013 – 1:47.61	Succeeded by (France); Jérémy Stravius (23.15); Giacomo Perez Dortona (26.41); Mélanie Henique (25.45); Anna Santamans (24.53); October 20, 2013 – 1:39.54
