= Siberian Ice Half Marathon =

Road running event in Omsk, Russia

- Date: early January
- Location: Omsk, Russia
- Event type: Road running
- Distance: 21.098 km
- Established: 1991
- Website: Siberian Ice Half Marathon
- Participants: 277 finishers (2022); 415 (2020)

Siberian Ice Half Marathon (Russian: Рождественский полумарафон, Christmas Half Marathon) is a recurring athletic (road race) competition. Siberian Ice Half Marathon is held most every year on January 7 in Omsk (Russia).

== Competition format ==
Siberian Ice Half Marathon in its current format includes running competitions on half marathon distance, as well as a non-competitive 7 km distance and ekiden on a half-marathon distance (where each of 6 team members runs only 3.5 km). According to the official Web site of the non-for-profit partnership Marathon, Siberian Ice Half Marathon is the only mass-participation long-distance race in Russia in the winter season. The race course is encompassing the historical center of Omsk making a 3.5 km loop.

Any competitors 14 years old or older can take part in the race. Every participants receives a toque and a Christmas souvenir, and every one who manages to finish the race gets a diploma and an original medal. Winners and medalists also receive monetary prizes (in 2014, the overall prize fund is 70 thousands rubles for the individual race and 54 thousands for the ekiden). A separate prize is also awarded to a participant running the distance in the most extravagant costume.

== History ==
First Christmas half marathon in Omsk was held in 1991 when it was run at −10 degrees Celsius. Since 1993 the Christmas half marathon became an annual event held every year at the same date.

The coldest edition of the competition was held in 2001 when the temperatures dropped to -39 degrees Celsius. The participants at that day were asked to run only 6 km irrespectively of what distance they registered to, but still 13 runners completed the entire half marathon distance. This record temperature brought the competition an unofficial title of "the coldest marathon in the world". The warmest temperature at the date of the race was registered in 2012, when it reached only 4 degrees below zero (with a wind speed of 3 m/s). The speed record for the men's competition belongs to Murmansk representative Vadim Ulizhov (1:08:10 in 2011) while the women's record is held by the local runner Eugenia Danilova (1:17:36 in 2008).

Although Siberian Ice Half Marathon historically attracts runners from abroad (e. g., in 2003 a Kazakh runner won the men's race, and in 2011 competitors from 7 countries beside Russia took part in the competition), only since 2012 it is officially recognized by the Association of International Marathons and Distance Races (AIMS) and included in its calendar of competitions.

There was no race in 2021.

== Winners ==
NOTE: not held in 2021.

Year	Half marathon — men	Half marathon — women	Ekiden — men	Ekiden — women
2024	(Novosibirsk) Petr Shvetsov — 1:14:20	(Chelyabinsk) Tatiana Kuramshina — 1:24:18		
2023	(Novosibirsk) Valeriy Lukin — 1:16:59	(Novosibirsk) Yelena Sedova — 1:31:04		
2022	(Perm Krai) Aleksey Patrakov — 1:16:32	(Omsk Oblast) Marina Kovaleva — 1:20:05		
2020	(Khanty-Mansi Autonomous Okrug) Mikhail Kulkov — 1:13:43	(Omsk Oblast) Mariya Druzhina — 1:29:45		
2019	(Khanty-Mansi Autonomous Okrug) Mikhail Kulkov — 1:13:34	(Ufa) Leysan Yakhina — 1:23:20		
2018	(Omsk Oblast) Aleksandr Butrameyev — 1:11:42	(Novosibirsk) Marina Kovaleva — 1:17:38		
2017	(Bashkortostan) Sergey Petrov — 1:08:16	(Novosibirsk) Natalya Tarasova — 1:22:06		
2016	(Krasnoyarsk) Vasiliy Minayev — 1:09:12	(Novosibirsk) Marina Kovaleva — 1:22:35		
2015	(Omsk Oblast) Aleksandr Butrameyev — 1:10:12	(Novosibirsk) Marina Kovaleva — 1:21:02		
2014	(Krasnoyarsk) Vasiliy Minayev — 1:11:34	(Omsk Oblast) Nina Podnebesnova — 1:19:47		
2013	(Khakassia) Artem Ekimov — 1:08:29	(Omsk Oblast) Eugenia Danilova — 1:22:07	(Omsk Oblast) JSC Babylon Ltd. — 1:11:39	(Omsk Oblast) SibGUFK — 1:33:49
2012	(Murmansk Oblast) Vadim Ulizhov — 1:09.13	(Omsk Oblast) Nina Podnebesnova — 1:21.26		
2011	(Murmansk Oblast) Vadim Ulizhov — 1:08:10	(Omsk Oblast) Nina Podnebesnova — 1:22:14		
2010	(Penza Oblast) Alexandr Bolhovitin — 1:09:27	(Omsk Oblast) Eugenia Danilova — 1:25:52		
2009	(Murmansk Oblast) Vadim Ulizhov — 1:08:25	(Omsk Oblast) Eugenia Danilova — 1:25:57		
2008	(Murmansk Oblast) Vadim Ulizhov — 1:08:27	(Omsk Oblast) Eugenia Danilova — 1:17:36		
2007	(Omsk Oblast) Alexandr Elunin — 1:08:19	(Omsk Oblast) Nina Podnebesnova — 1:17:45		
2006	(Omsk Oblast) Denis Rychkov — 1:08:26	(Omsk Oblast) Eugenia Danilova — 1:26:01		
2005	(Omsk Oblast) Alexandr Elunin — 1:11:04	(Omsk Oblast) Nina Podnebesnova — 1:24:22		
2004	(Omsk Oblast) Igor Tyupin — 1:11:15	(Omsk Oblast) Nina Podnebesnova — 1:23:56		
2003	(Kazakhstan) Pavel Broda — 1:10:41	(Omsk Oblast) Irina Sukhorukova — 1:43:36		
2002	(Kemerovo Oblast) Evgeniy Lykov — 1:11:32	(Omsk Oblast) Anastasiia Vershinina — 1:34:33		

== External sources ==
- Siberian Ice Half Marathon official Web cite
