= 4 × 50 metres medley relay =

The 4 × 50 metres medley relay is an event in competitive swimming. It is only recognised by World Aquatics (formerly FINA) in short course.

Each of four swimmers on a team swims a 50 m leg of the relay, each swimming a different stroke, in the following sequence:

1. Backstroke (this can only be the first stroke, due to the necessity of starting this leg in the pool rather than by diving in)
2. Breaststroke
3. Butterfly
4. Freestyle (in medley swimming, it must be any stroke not previously swum – most swimmers use the front crawl).

World records are ratified by World Aquatics. The current world record holders are Italy (men), Australia (women) and the US (mixed). The men's, women's and mixed events were first contested at the World Aquatics Swimming Championships (25m) in 2014; the men's and women's events were removed from the 2024 program. The current world champion (mixed) is Neutral Athletes B.

== World record progression ==
=== Men ===
#	Time		Name	Nationality	Date	Meet	Location	Ref
1	1:50.07		Curtis Goss; Blaine Nichols; Kyle Johnson; Tanner Kurz	(United States) Indiana University Hoosiers	26 September 2013	IU Fall Frenzy	Bloomington, United States	
2	1:33.65	h	Niccolo' Bonacchi (23.95); Francesco di Lecce (26.10); Piero Codia (22.68); Luca Dotto (20.92)	Italy	12 December 2013	European Championships	Herning, Denmark	
3	1:32.38	not ratified (Note: Vitaly Melnikov was suspended in May 2015 for doping use)	Vitaly Melnikov (23.72); Oleg Kostin (26.18); Nikita Konovalov (21.92); Vladimir Morozov (20.56)	Russia	12 December 2013	European Championships	Herning, Denmark	
4	1:32.83		Stefano Pizzamiglio (23.74); Francesco di Lecce (26.07); Piero Codia (22.59); Marco Orsi (20.43)	Italy	12 December 2013	European Championships	Herning, Denmark	
5	1:32.78	h	Stanislav Donets (23.73); Sergey Geybel (25.96); Aleksandr Popkov (22.47); Evgeny Sedov (20.62)	Russia	4 December 2014	World Championships	Doha, Qatar	
6	1:30.51		Guilherme Guido (23.42); Felipe França Silva (25.33); Nicholas Santos (21.68); César Cielo Filho (20.08)	Brazil	4 December 2014	World Championships	Doha, Qatar	
7	1:30.44		Kliment Kolesnikov (22.83); Kirill Prigoda (25.26); Aleksandr Popkov (22.11); Vladimir Morozov (20.24)	Russia	17 December 2017	European Championships	Copenhagen, Denmark	
8	1:30.14		Michele Lamberti (22.62); Nicolò Martinenghi (25.14); Marco Orsi (22.17); Lorenzo Zazzeri (20.21)	Italy	3 November 2021	European Championships	Kazan, Russia	
9	1:29.72		Lorenzo Mora (22.65); Nicolò Martinenghi (24.95); Matteo Rivolta (21.60); Leonardo Deplano (20.52)	Italy	17 December 2022	World Championships	Melbourne, Australia	

Legend: # – Record awaiting ratification by FINA; e – equalled existing record;
Records not set in finals: h – heat; so – swim-off

=== Women ===
#	Time		Name	Nationality	Date	Meet	Location	Ref
1	2:04.34		Grace Padget; Heather Hayes; Bailey Pressey; Madelon Webb	(United States) Indiana University Hoosiers	26 September 2013	IU Fall Frenzy	Bloomington, United States	
2	1:45.92	h	Mie Nielsen (27.00); Rikke Møller Pedersen (29.73); Jeanette Ottesen (25.25); Pernille Blume (23.94)	Denmark	15 December 2013	European Championships	Herning, Denmark	
3	1:44.67	not ratified (Note: Yuliya Efimova was suspended on May 13, 2014 for doping use)	Daria Ustinova (27.57); Yuliya Yefimova (28.30); Svetlana Chimrova (25.15); Rozaliya Nasretdinova (23.65)	Russia	15 December 2013	European Championships	Herning, Denmark	
4	1:44.81		Mie Nielsen (26.47); Rikke Møller Pedersen (29.73); Jeanette Ottesen (24.59); Pernille Blume (24.02)	Denmark	15 December 2013	European Championships	Herning, Denmark	
5	1:44.04		Mie Nielsen (26.39); Rikke Møller Pedersen (29.56); Jeanette Ottesen (24.09); Pernille Blume (24.00)	Denmark	5 December 2014	World Championships	Doha, Qatar	
6	1:43.27		Ali DeLoof (26.12); Lilly King (28.78); Kelsi Worrell (24.44); Katrina Konopka (23.93)	United States	7 December 2016	World Championships	Windsor, Canada	
7	1:42.38		Olivia Smoliga (25.97); Katie Meili (29.29); Kelsi Dahlia (24.02); Mallory Comerford (23.10)	United States	12 December 2018	World Championships	Hangzhou, China	
8	1:42.38	=	Louise Hansson (25.91); Sophie Hansson (29.07); Sarah Sjöström (23.96); Michelle Coleman (23.44)	Sweden	17 December 2021	World Championships	Abu Dhabi, United Arab Emirates	
9	1:42.35		Mollie O'Callaghan (25.49); Chelsea Hodges (29.11); Emma McKeon (24.43); Madison Wilson (23.32)	Australia	17 December 2022	World Championships	Melbourne, Australia	

Legend: # – Record awaiting ratification by FINA; e – equalled existing record;
Records not set in finals: h – heat; so – swim-off

=== Mixed ===
#	Time		Name	Nationality	Date	Meet	Location	Ref
1	1:49.87		James Wells; Cody Miller; Gia Dalesandro; Olivia Barker	(United States) Indiana University Hoosiers	26 September 2013	IU Fall Frenzy	Bloomington, United States	
2	1:47.61		Dustin Rhoads (25.54); Andrew Marciniak (27.68); Haley Gordon (27.81); Olivia Kabacinski (26.58)	(United States) Iowa University	28 September 2013	Water Carnival	Ann Arbor, United States	
3	1:41.70		Sergey Makov (23.98); Andrey Grechin (26.90); Daria Tchvetkova (25.97); Ekaterina Borovikova (24.85)	Russia	12 October 2013	World Cup	Moscow, Russia	
4	1:39.54		Jérémy Stravius (23.15); Giacomo Perez Dortona (26.41); Melanie Henique (25.45); Anna Santamans (24.53)	France	20 October 2013	World Cup	Doha, Qatar	
5	1:39.08	h	Bobby Hurley (23.81); Christian Sprenger (26.07); Alicia Coutts (25.57); Cate Campbell (23.63)	Australia	5 November 2013	World Cup	Singapore, Singapore	
6	1:38.02		Bobby Hurley (23.47); Christian Sprenger (25.97); Alicia Coutts (25.35); Cate Campbell (23.23)	Australia	5 November 2013	World Cup	Singapore, Singapore	
7	1:37.84		Bobby Hurley (23.46); Christian Sprenger (25.91); Alicia Coutts (25.19); Cate Campbell (23.28)	Australia	9 November 2013	World Cup	Tokyo, Japan	
8	1:37.63	# (Note: unratified, Yuliya Efimova was suspended on May 13, 2014 for doping use, Vitaly Melnikov was suspended in May 2015 for doping use)	Vitaly Melnikov (23.70); Yuliya Efimova (28.39); Svetlana Chimrova (25.29); Vladimir Morozov (20.25)	Russia	13 December 2013	European Championships	Herning, Denmark	
9	1:37.17		Eugene Godsoe (22.88); Kevin Cordes (25.40); Claire Donahue (25.28); Simone Manuel (23.61)	United States	21 December 2013	Duel in the Pool	Glasgow, United Kingdom	
10	1:36.40		Olivia Smoliga (25.85); Michael Andrew (25.75); Kelsi Dahlia (24.71); Caeleb Dressel (20.09)	United States	13 December 2018	World Championships	Hangzhou, China	
11	1:36.22		Kliment Kolesnikov (22.67); Vladimir Morozov (25.40); Arina Surkova (24.94); Maria Kameneva (23.21)	Russia	5 December 2019	European Championships	Glasgow, Great Britain	
12	1:36.18		Kira Toussaint (25.99); Arno Kamminga (25.54); Maaike de Waard (24.50); Thom de Boer (20.15)	Netherlands	7 November 2021	European Championships	Kazan, Russia	
13	1:35.15		Ryan Murphy (22.37); Nic Fink (24.96); Kate Douglass (24.09); Torri Huske (23.73)	United States	14 December 2022	World Championships	Melbourne, Australia	

Legend: # – Record awaiting ratification by FINA; e – equalled existing record;
Records not set in finals: h – heat; so – swim-off

== All-time rankings ==
Tables show data for the top 25 4 × 50 m medley relay times and the top 10 national records:
- denotes top 10 national record by teams in the top 25 4 × 50 m medley relay times
- denotes lesser performances, still in the top 25 4 × 50 m medley relay times, by repeat nations
- denotes performances in the top 25 4 × 50 m medley relay times by a team with multiple nationalities
- denotes top 10 national record for other teams who fall outside the top 25 4 × 50 m medley relay times

=== Men ===
- Correct as of September 2026

Nat.#	Perf.#	Time	Athletes	Team	Date	Place	Ref.
1	1	1:29.72	Lorenzo Mora (22.65); Nicolò Martinenghi (24.95); Matteo Rivolta (21.60); Leonardo Deplano (20.52)	Italy	17 December 2022	Melbourne	
	2	1:30.14	Michele Lamberti (22.62); Nicolò Martinenghi (25.14); Marco Orsi (22.17); Lorenzo Zazzeri (20.21)	Italy #2	2 November 2021	Kazan	
2	3	1:30.37	Ryan Murphy (22.61); Nic Fink (25.24); Shaine Casas (22.13); Michael Andrew (20.39)	United States	17 December 2022	Melbourne	
3	4	1:30.44	Kliment Kolesnikov (22.83); Kirill Prigoda (25.26); Aleksandr Popkov (22.11); Vladimir Morozov (20.24)	Russia	17 December 2017	Copenhagen	
	5	1:30.49	Francesco Lazzari (23.05); Simone Cerasuolo (25.42); Simone Stefanì (21.52); Leonardo Deplano (20.50)	Italy #3	7 December 2025	Lublin	
4	6	1:30.51	Guilherme Guido (23.42); Felipe França Silva (25.33); Nicholas Santos (21.68); César Cielo (20.08)	Brazil	4 December 2014	Doha	
	6	1:30.51	Kliment Kolesnikov (22.76); Kirill Strelnikov (25.62); Andrey Minakov (21.76); Vladimir Morozov (20.37)	Russia #2 (Note: Competed as the Russian Swimming Federation under no flag.)	20 December 2021	Abu Dhabi	
	6	1:30.51	Shaine Casas (23.11); Nic Fink (25.13); Tom Shields (21.75); Ryan Held (20.52)	US #2	20 December 2021	Abu Dhabi	
	9	1:30.54	Kliment Kolesnikov (22.87); Oleg Kostin (25.36); Mikhail Vekovishchev (22.09); Evgeny Rylov (20.22)	Russia #3	15 December 2018	Hangzhou	
	10	1:30.63	Kliment Kolesnikov (22.64); Vladimir Morozov (25.53); Oleg Kostin (21.61); Vladislav Grinev (20.85)	Russia #4	8 December 2019	Glasgow	
	11	1:30.78	Lorenzo Mora (23.24); Nicolò Martinenghi (25.30); Matteo Rivolta (21.95); Lorenzo Zazzeri (20.29)	Italy #4	20 December 2021	Abu Dhabi	
	11	1:30.78	Lorenzo Mora (22.98); Nicolò Martinenghi (25.32); Thomas Ceccon (22.05); Lorenzo Zazzeri (20.43)	Italy #5	6 December 2023	Otopeni	
	13	1:30.79	Kliment Kolesnikov (22.58); Oleg Kostin (25.51); Wladimir Morozov (22.18); Vladislav Grinev (20.52)	Russia #5	2 November 2021	Kazan	
5	14	1:30.81	Isaac Cooper (22.66); Grayson Bell (25.92); Matthew Temple (21.75); Kyle Chalmers (20.48)	Australia	17 December 2022	Melbourne	
	15	1:30.90	Ryan Murphy (22.73); Michael Andrew (26.16); Caeleb Dressel (21.70); Ryan Held (20.31)	US #3	15 December 2018	Hangzhou	
6	16	1:30.99	Mewen Tomac (22.98); Jérémie Delbois (26.00); Clément Secchi (22.05); Maxime Grousset (19.96)	France	7 December 2025	Lublin	
	17	1:31.25	Benjamin Stasiulis (23.41); Giacomo Perez-Dortona (25.74); Mehdy Metella (22.06); Florent Manaudou (20.04)	France #2	4 December 2014	Doha	
7	18	1:31.28	Takeshi Kawamoto (22.93); Yuya Hinomoto (25.64); Yuya Tanaka (22.13); Masahiro Kawane (20.58)	Japan	17 December 2022	Melbourne	
	19	1:31.31	Jonathon Marshall (23.34); Julian Smith (25.63); Joshua Liendo (21.43); Ed Fullum-Huot (20.91)	University of Florida; Great Britain; United States; Canada; Canada	18 October 2024	Charlottesville	
	20	1:31.41	Mewen Tomac (22.96); Carl Aitkaci (26.01); Maxime Grousset (21.90); Florent Manaudou (20.54)	France #3	17 December 2022	Melbourne	
	21	1:31.49	Guilherme Guido (22.97); Felipe Lima (25.48); Nicholas Santos (22.02); César Cielo (21.02)	Brazil #2	15 December 2018	Hangzhou	
	22	1:31.52	Andrey Shabasov (23.46); Kirill Prigoda (25.52); Aleksandr Popkov (22.08); Vladimir Morozov (20.46)	Russia #6	10 December 2016	Windsor	
	23	1:31.54	Simone Sabbioni (23.40); Fabio Scozzoli (25.51); Marco Orsi (22.23); Santo Condorelli (20.40)	Italy #6	15 December 2018	Hangzhou	
	24	1:31.71	Simone Sabbioni (23.29); Fabio Scozzoli (25.88); Matteo Rivolta (22.19); Marco Orsi (20.35)	Italy #7	6 December 2015	Netanya	
8	25	1:31.79	Ole Braunschweig (23.09); Lucas Matzerath (25.87); Marius Kusch (21.72); Josha Salchow (21.11)	Germany	17 December 2022	Melbourne	
9		1:31.84	Iván Martínez Sota (23.31); Carles Coll (25.65); Hugo González (22.60); Sergio de Celis (20.28)	Spain	7 December 2025	Lublin	
10		1:31.85	Lukas Edl (23.70); Valentin Bayer (25.79); Simon Bucher (22.01); Heiko Gigler (20.35)	Austria	7 December 2025	Lublin	

=== Women ===
- Correct as of September 2026

Nat.#	Perf.#	Time	Athletes	Team	Date	Place	Ref.
1	1	1:42.35	Mollie O'Callaghan (25.49); Chelsea Hodges (29.11); Emma McKeon (24.43); Madison Wilson (23.32)	Australia	17 December 2022	Melbourne	
2	2	1:42.38	Olivia Smoliga (25.97); Katie Meili (29.29); Kelsi Dahlia (24.02); Mallory Comerford (23.10)	United States	12 December 2018	Hangzhou	
2	2	1:42.38	Louise Hansson (25.91); Sophie Hansson (29.07); Sarah Sjöström (23.96); Michelle Coleman (23.44)	Sweden	17 December 2021	Abu Dhabi	
	4	1:42.41	Claire Curzan (25.75); Lilly King (29.00); Torri Huske (24.94); Kate Douglass (22.72)	US #2	17 December 2022	Melbourne	
	5	1:42.43	Louise Hansson (25.86); Klara Thormalm (29.34); Sara Junevik (24.06); Michelle Coleman (23.17)	Sweden #2	17 December 2022	Melbourne	
4	6	1:42.69	Hinkelien Schreuder (26.32); Moniek Nijhuis (29.16); Inge Dekker (24.51); Ranomi Kromowidjojo (22.70)	Netherlands	12 December 2009	Istanbul	
	7	1:42.83	Marrit Steenbergen (25.47); Tessa Giele (29.76); Maaike de Waard (24.42); Valerie van Roon (23.18)	Netherlands #2	7 December 2025	Lublin	
	8	1:43.26	Louise Hansson (26.47); Sophie Hansson (28.96); Sara Juvenik (24.76); Michelle Coleman (23.07)	Sweden #3	7 December 2023	Otopeni	
	9	1:43.27	Ali DeLoof (26.12); Lilly King (28.78); Kelsi Worrell (24.44); Katrina Konopka (23.93)	US #3	7 December 2016	Windsor	
5	10	1:43.56	Kylie Masse (25.84); Sydney Pickrem (29.69); Maggie Mac Neil (24.40); Taylor Ruck (23.63)	Canada	17 December 2022	Melbourne	
	11	1:43.61	Rhyan White (26.33); Lydia Jacoby (29.62); Claire Curzan (24.56); Abbey Weitzeil (23.10)	US #4	17 December 2021	Abu Dhabi	
	12	1:43.72	Kira Toussaint (26.20); Tes Schouten (29.81); Maaike de Waard (24.39); Marrit Steenbergen (23.32)	Netherlands #3	17 December 2022	Melbourne	
	13	1:43.79	Hanna Rosvall (26.40); Sophie Hansson (29.31); Sara Junevik (24.52); Louise Hansson (23.56)	Sweden #4	7 December 2025	Lublin	
6	14	1:43.96	Analia Pigrée (26.30); Charlotte Bonnet (29.64); Mélanie Henique (24.78); Beryl Gastadello (23.24)	France	17 December 2022	Melbourne	
7	15	1:43.97	Costanza Cocconcelli (26.87); Benedetta Pilato (28.75); Silvia di Pietro (25.19); Jasmine Nocentini (23.16)	Italy	7 December 2023	Otopeni	
	16	1:44.03	Kira Toussaint (26.08); Kim Busch (30.59); Maaike de Waard (24.51); Ranomi Kromowidjojo (22.85)	Netherlands #4	17 December 2021	Abu Dhabi	
8	17	1:44.04	Mie Nielsen (26.39); Rikke Pedersen (29.56); Jeanette Ottesen (24.09); Pernille Blume (24.00)	Denmark	5 December 2014	Doha	
	18	1:44.14	Gretchen Walsh (25.37); Zoe Skirboll (30.00); Claire Curzan (24.52); Maxine Parker (24.25)	US #5	18 October 2024	Charlottesville	
	19	1:44.16	Kira Toussaint (26.08); Kim Busch (30.59); Maaike de Waard (24.51); Ranomi Kromowidjojo (22.85)	Netherlands #5	13 December 2020	Eindhoven	
	19	1:44.16	Kylie Masse (25.92); Sydney Pickrem (29.89); Maggie Mac Neil (24.85); Kayla Sanchez (23.50)	Canada #2	17 December 2021	Abu Dhabi	
9	21	1:44.19	Maria Kameneva (26.42); Nika Godun (29.47); Arina Surkova (24.49); Daria Klepikova (23.81)	Russia	4 November 2021	Kazan	
10	22	1:44.31	Fu Yuanhui (26.20); Suo Ran (29.63); Wang Yichun (24.84); Wu Yue (23.64)	China	12 December 2018	Hangzhou	
	23	1:44.32	Hanna Rosvall (26.57); Emelie Fast (29.96); Sara Junevik (24.85); Sarah Sjöström (22.94)	Sweden #5	4 November 2021	Kazan	
	24	1:44.33	Costanza Cocconcelli (26.74); Irene Burato (29.63); Silvia di Pietro (24.67); Sara Curtis (23.29)	Italy #2	7 December 2025	Lublin	
	25	1:44.43	Hanna Rosvall (26.96); Sophie Hansson (29.30); Sarah Sjöström (24.27); Michelle Coleman (23.90)	Sweden #6	17 December 2017	Copenhagen	
	25	1:44.43	Wan Letian (26.41); Tang Qianting (28.96); Yu Yiting (25.28); Cheng Yujie (23.78)	China #2	17 December 2021	Abu Dhabi	

=== Mixed ===
- Correct as of September 2026

Nat.#	Perf.#	Time	Athletes	Team	Date	Place	Ref.
1	1	1:35.15	Ryan Murphy (22.37); Nic Fink (24.96); Kate Douglass (24.09); Torri Huske (23.73)	United States	14 December 2022	Melbourne	
2	2	1:35.36	Miron Lifintsev (22.39); Kirill Prigoda (24.94); Arina Surkova (24.43); Daria Trofimova (23.60)	Russia (Note: Competed for Neutral Athletes B team.)	11 December 2024	Budapest	
3	3	1:35.94	Kylie Masse (25.87); Finlay Knox (25.53); Ilya Kharun (20.73); Ingrid Wilm (23.81)	Canada	11 December 2024	Budapest	
4	4	1:36.01	Lorenzo Mora (22.59); Nicolò Martinenghi (24.83); Silvia Di Pietro (24.52); Costanza Cocconcelli (24.07)	Italy	14 December 2022	Melbourne	
	5	1:36.09	Francesco Lazzari (22.62); Simone Cerasuolo (25.14); Silvia Di Pietro (22.17); Sara Curtis (20.21)	Italy #2	3 December 2025	Lublin	
	6	1:36.11	Kliment Kolesnikov (22.60); Kirill Prigoda (25.34); Arina Surkova (24.85); Maria Kameneva (23.32)	Russia #2	16 December 2022	Saint Petersburg	
5	7	1:36.18	Kira Toussaint (25.99); Arno Kamminga (25.54); Maaike de Waard (24.50); Thom de Boer (20.15)	Netherlands	7 November 2021	Kazan	
5	7	1:36.18	Maaike de Waard (26.02); Caspar Corbeau (24.78); Sean Niewold (22.27); Marrit Steenbergen (23.11)	Netherlands	3 December 2025	Lublin	
	9	1:36.20	Kira Toussaint (26.21); Arno Kamminga (25.40); Ranomi Kromowidjojo (24.36); Thom de Boer (20.23)	Netherlands #3	18 December 2021	Abu Dhabi	
	9	1:36.20	Shaine Casas (22.85); Michael Andrew (25.29); Regan Smith (24.90); Katharine Berkoff (23.16)	US #2	11 December 2024	Budapest	
	11	1:36.22	Kliment Kolesnikov (22.67); Vladimir Morozov (25.40); Arina Surkova (24.94); Maria Kameneva (23.21)	Russia #3	5 December 2019	Glasgow	
	12	1:36.24	Pavel Samusenko (22.26); Kirill Prigoda (26.30); Arina Surkova (24.62); Alina Gaifutdinova (23.16)	Russia #4	20 December 2025	Saint Petersburg	
	13	1:36.39	Michele Lamberti (22.72); Nicolò Martinenghi (25.13); Elena di Liddo (25.09); Silvia di Pietro (23.45)	Italy #3	7 November 2021	Kazan	
	14	1:36.40	Olivia Smoliga (25.85); Michael Andrew (25.75); Kelsi Dahlia (24.74); Caeleb Dressel (20.09)	US #3	13 December 2018	Hangzhou	
	15	1:36.42	Kliment Kolesnikov (22.47); Oleg Kostin (25.58); Arina Surkova (24.88); Maria Kameneva (23.49)	Russia #5	7 November 2021	Kazan	
	16	1:36.58	Lorenzo Mora (23.01); Nicolò Martinenghi (24.87); Silvia Di Pietro (25.32); Jasmine Nocentini (23.38)	Italy #4	10 December 2023	Otopeni	
6	17	1:36.78	Isaac Cooper (22.68); Joshua Yong (25.87); Alexandria Perkins (24.61); Meg Harris (23.62)	Australia	11 December 2024	Budapest	
	18	1:36.80	Lorenzo Mora (22.85); Simone Cerasuolo (25.75); Silvia Di Pietro (25.04); Sara Curtis (23.16)	Italy #5	11 December 2024	Budapest	
	18	1:36.80	Pavel Samusenko (22.77); Kirill Prigoda (25.25); Arina Surkova (24.89); Daria Klepikova (23.89)	Russia #6	11 November 2025	Minsk	
	20	1:36.83	Lorenzo Mora (23.01); Nicolò Martinenghi (24.87); Silvia Di Pietro (25.32); Jasmine Nocentini (23.38)	Italy #6	10 December 2023	Otopeni	
	21	1:36.93	Kylie Masse (25.71); Javier Acevedo (25.95); Ilya Kharun (22.12); Maggie Mac Neil (23.15)	Canada #2	14 December 2022	Melbourne	
7	22	1:36.98	Aleksander Styś (23.13); Jan Kałusowski (25.71); Kornelia Fiedkiewicz (25.32); Katarzyna Wasick (22.82)	Poland	3 December 2025	Lublin	
	23	1:37.04	Shaine Casas (23.16); Nic Fink (25.82); Claire Curzan (24.85); Abbey Weitzeil (23.21)	US #4	18 December 2021	Abu Dhabi	
	24	1:37.05	Jesse Puts (23.87); Ties Elzerman (26.01); Ranomi Kromowidjojo (24.27); Femke Heemskerk (22.90)	Netherlands #4	13 December 2018	Hangzhou	
8	24	1:37.05	Louise Hansson (26.07); Daniel Kertes (25.48); Sara Junevik (24.49); Elias Persson (21.01)	Sweden	11 December 2024	Budapest	
9		1:37.07	Medi Harris (26.60); Adam Peaty (25.24); Ben Proud (21.93); Anna Hopkin (23.30)	Great Britain	14 December 2022	Melbourne	
10		1:37.14	Mewen Tomac (22.83); Florent Manaudou (25.70); Béryl Gastaldello (24.92); Charlotte Bonnet (23.69)	France	10 December 2023	Otopeni	

== World champions ==
=== Men ===
Edition	Winner	Time	Notes	Ref.
(Qatar) Doha 2014	Brazil (BRA)	1:30.51	WR (Note: Heat swimmer, João Gomes Júnior tested positive for Hydrochlorothiazide during the competition. He was stripped of his medals, but Brazil's overall results were upheld.)	
(Canada) Windsor 2016	Russia (RUS)	1:31.52		
(China) Hangzhou 2018	Russia (RUS)	1:30.54		
(United Arab Emirates) Abu Dhabi 2021	Russian Swimming Federation (RSF)	1:30.51	=CR	
(United Arab Emirates) Abu Dhabi 2021	United States (USA)	1:30.51	=CR	
(Australia) Melbourne 2022	Italy (ITA)	1:29.72	WR	
2024–present	not included in the program			

=== Women ===
Edition	Winner	Time	Notes	Ref.
(Qatar) Doha 2014	Netherlands (NED)	1:44.04	WR	
(Canada) Windsor 2016	United States (USA)	1:43.27	WR	
(China) Hangzhou 2018	United States (USA)	1:42.38	WR	
(United Arab Emirates) Abu Dhabi 2021	Sweden (SWE)	1:42.38	=WR	
(Australia) Melbourne 2022	Australia (AUS)	1:42.35	WR	
2024–present	not included in the program			

=== Mixed ===
Edition	Winner	Time	Notes	Ref.
(Qatar) Doha 2014	Brazil (BRA)	1:37.26	CR	
(Canada) Windsor 2016	United States (USA)	1:37.22	CR	
(China) Hangzhou 2018	United States (USA)	1:36.40	WR	
(Netherlands) Abu Dhabi 2021	Sweden (SWE)	1:36.20	CR	
(Australia) Melbourne 2022	United States (USA)	1:35.15	WR	
(Hungary) Budapest 2024	Neutral Athletes B (NAB)	1:35.36		
