= Sean Mahoney =

American swimmer (born 1988)

Personal information
- Born: 12 August 1988 (age 37) Lodi, California, U.S.
- Height: 6 ft 0 in (183 cm)

Sport
- Country: United States
- Sport: Swimming
- Event: Breaststroke
Medal record
Pan American Games
Gold medal – first place	2011 Guadalajara	200 m breaststroke

Sean Mahoney (born August 12, 1988) is an American former breaststroke swimmer.

== Early life ==
A native of Rio Vista, California, Mahoney was a collegiate swimmer for West Virginia University and UC Berkeley.

== Career ==
In 2009, Mahoney competed in the Duel in the Pool and came third in the 200 m breaststroke. He placed fifth in the 200 m breaststroke at that year's World University Games, having earlier broken the games record in the semi-finals.

She was given a six-month suspension in 2010 after testing positive for the stimulant methylhexaneamine. At the 2011 Pan American Games in Guadalajara, Mahoney won a gold medal for the United States in the 200 m breaststroke, setting a games record in the process. The previous record was set by Kyle Salyards in 2003. Mahoney won four 200 m breaststroke meets in the 2012 FINA Swimming World Cup.
