= Kenneth To =

Hong Kong Australian swimmer (1992–2019)

Kenneth To 杜敬謙
Personal information
- Full name: Kenneth To King-him
- Nickname: Kenny
- National team: Australia (2004–2016); Hong Kong (2017–2019)
- Born: 7 July 1992 Hong Kong
- Died: 19 March 2019 (aged 26) Gainesville, Florida, U.S.
- Height: 170 cm (5 ft 7 in)
- Weight: 70 kg (154 lb; 11 st 0 lb)

Sport
- Sport: Swimming
- Strokes: Individual medley, freestyle, butterfly, breaststroke
- Club: Trinity Grammar School
- Coach: Matthew Brown, Chen Qin
Medal record
World Championships (LC)
Silver medal – second place	2013 Barcelona	4×100 m medley
World Championships (SC)
Silver medal – second place	2012 Istanbul	100 m medley
Bronze medal – third place	2012 Istanbul	4×100 m freestyle
Bronze medal – third place	2012 Istanbul	4×100 m medley
Commonwealth Games
Gold medal – first place	2014 Glasgow	4×100 m freestyle
Silver medal – second place	2014 Glasgow	4×100 m medley
Youth Olympic Games
Gold medal – first place	2010 Singapore	4×100 m medley
Silver medal – second place	2010 Singapore	50 m freestyle
Silver medal – second place	2010 Singapore	200 m medley
Silver medal – second place	2010 Singapore	4×100 m freestyle
Bronze medal – third place	2010 Singapore	100 m freestyle
Bronze medal – third place	2010 Singapore	4×100 m medley

Kenneth King-him To (7 July 1992 – 19 March 2019) was a Hong Kong Australian swimmer who practised individual medley, freestyle, butterfly and breaststroke. He won 6 medals at the 2010 Summer Youth Olympics, was the male overall winner of the 2012 FINA Swimming World Cup and was a World Championships silver medallist. He was the holder of 16 Hong Kong national swimming records.

== Early life ==
After moving to Australia from Hong Kong at the age of 2, To started swimming at the age of 5 at his local pool. He was originally scared of the water, but by age 12, had made rapid progress through his primary school swimming program. Growing up, To had a very successful junior career, winning medals at both the 2009 Australian Youth Olympic Festival in Sydney and the 2008 Commonwealth Youth Games in Pune.

== Career ==
In 2009, he came into the swimming spotlight when he broke Ian Thorpe's decade-old Australian record in the 16 years 200m individual medley, swimming a time of 2:04.31. At the 2010 Summer Youth Olympics in Singapore, To won gold in the 4 × 100 m medley relay, silver in the 50m freestyle, 200m medley and 4 × 100 m mixed freestyle relay, and bronze in the 100m freestyle and 4 × 100 m mixed medley relay.

At the 2010 Junior Pan Pacific Swimming Championships in Maui, To won gold in the 50m freestyle, 100m freestyle and 4 × 200 m freestyle relay, and silver in the 4 × 100 m freestyle and medley relays. At the 2010 Australian Short Course Swimming Championships in Brisbane, To made his breakthrough onto the senior Australian Swimming Team. He won gold in the 100m medley, silver in the 200m medley and bronze in the 100m breaststroke, earning selection to compete at the 2010 FINA World Swimming Championships (25 m). At the 2010 FINA World Swimming Championships (25 m) in Dubai, To placed 5th in the 100m medley and 6th in the 200m medley.

To regained selection on the Australian Swim Team at the 2011 Australian Swimming Championships in Sydney. He won silver in the 200m medley, earning selection to compete at the 2011 World Aquatics Championships, where he placed 7th in the 200m medley. In the heats of that event, he had a breakout performance, clocking 1:59.02 to rank 3rd overall going into the semifinal. At the 2011 FINA Swimming World Cup series, To placed 9th in the men's overall scoring on a total of 31 points.

At the 2012 Australian Swimming Championships in Adelaide, To narrowly missed out on earning selection to compete at the 2012 Summer Olympics. He placed 4th in the 200m medley and 9th in the 100m freestyle, largely because 7 weeks earlier he had required an operation to remove his appendix. Nonetheless, To was selected to compete at the 2012 Oceania Swimming Championships. At the 2012 Oceania Swimming Championships in Nouméa, To won a total of 7 medals in a return to form. He won gold in the 100m freestyle, 200m freestyle, 200m medley, 4 × 100 m freestyle relay and 4 × 200 m freestyle relay, and silver in the 100m butterfly and 400m medley. At the 2012 FINA Swimming World Cup series, To claimed a big prize in winning the men's overall scoring on a total of 195 points. At the Dubai meet, he set a new Australian record for the 100m medley in 51.43. At the 2012 FINA World Swimming Championships (25 m) in Istanbul, To won silver in the 100m medley and bronze in the 4 × 100 m freestyle and medley relays. His time of 51.38 in the 100m medley was only 0.17 off the winning performance of American superstar Ryan Lochte, and set another Australian record in that event.

At the 2013 Australian Swimming Championships in Adelaide, To won silver in the 200m medley and 4 × 100 m medley relay and bronze in the 100m breaststroke. At this meet, he also competed in the heats of the 100m freestyle, clocking the equal 4th fastest time from heats, semifinals and finals. His performance in that event and the 200m medley earned him selection to compete at the 2013 World Aquatics Championships. At the 2013 World Aquatics Championships in Barcelona, To won silver as a butterfly heat swimmer for the 4 × 100 m medley relay team for Australia. He also swam as a heat swimmer in the second leg of the 4 × 100 m freestyle relay, which placed 4th in the final, and placed 13th individually in the 200m medley. At the 2013 FINA Swimming World Cup series, To placed 5th in the men's overall scoring on a total of 192 points. At the Berlin meet, he set a new Australian record in the 200m medley in 1:52.01, and similarly at the Doha meet in the 100m medley in 51.19.

At the 2014 Australian Swimming Championships in Brisbane, To won gold in the 4 × 100 m medley relay and placed 4th in the 100m freestyle. His performance in the 100m freestyle earned him selection to compete at the 2014 Commonwealth Games and the 2014 Pan Pacific Swimming Championships. At the 2014 Commonwealth Games in Glasgow, To won two medals – one gold as a heat swimmer for the 4 × 100 m freestyle, and one silver as a breaststroke heat swimmer for the 4 × 100 m medley relay teams for Australia. Upon completion of the Commonwealth Games, To withdrew from competing at the 2014 Pan Pacific Swimming Championships in order to undertake a L4-L5 microdiscectomy on an injured back which had been severely affecting his training and performance. Allowing for post-operative rest and recovery ruled To out of the 2014 FINA Swimming World Cup and 2014 FINA World Swimming Championships (25 m).

The injury in 2014 sidelined his World Championships and 2016 Rio Olympics hopes. To submitted paperwork to FINA for the transition to Hong Kong in late 2016. He made the decision after discussing it with his girlfriend after 2016 Australian Olympics trials and hoping to switch for new environment. He began training at the Hong Kong Sports Institute as a senior squad member, with the ultimate target being the 2020 Tokyo Olympics.

In August, To first represented Hong Kong at the 2017 Summer Universiade in Taipei. He broke 13 national records within 10 months including the LCM 50/100 freestyle, 50/100 breaststroke and 200 individual medley, along with the SCM 50/100/200 freestyle, 50/100 breaststroke, 50/100 butterfly and 100/200/400 individual medley.

In May, To received an award for his achievements from the Hong Kong Amateur Swimming Association. To participated in the 2018 Jakarta Asian Games but unfortunately did not win any medals. He finished fifth in the finals of the 50m freestyle and the 200m individual medley. During 2018 FINA World Swimming Championships (25 m) in Hangzhou, To became the first Hong Kong male swimmer qualified into final with 52.33 seconds on 13 December. He finished at 6th place in the final with faster time 51.88 seconds, a new Hong Kong national record.

In January, To moved to the United States to begin training under Gregg Troy at the University of Florida and participate in a training camp in the Florida Keys. He planned to compete at the Hong Kong Festival of Sport in April, which serves as one of the nation's qualifying meets for the 2019 World Aquatics Championships in Gwangju, South Korea.

== Death ==
On 19 March 2019, To began to feel unwell in the locker room after a warm up before a practice session in Florida, and was taken to a hospital, where he died. In a statement, HKSI described the 26-year-old as an exceptional person who was well loved by his teammates and competitors, and said his sudden passing is a huge loss to local sports. The Hong Kong Amateur Swimming Association, expressed sadness over To's death, saying he is the Hong Kong record holder of various swimming events, and won glory for the Territory in many international events. To's funeral was held on 1 April 2019 at Trinity Grammar School in Sydney, his former high school.

In June 2019, the cause of To's death was concluded to be from a sudden cardiac arrest.

== Career best times ==
=== Long Course ===
Event	Time	Meet	Location
100m Freestyle	48.58	2013 Australian Swimming Championships	(Australia) Adelaide
200m Medley	1:58.72	2013 Australian Swimming Championships	(Australia) Adelaide
100m Butterfly	52.56	2013 Australian Swimming Championships	(Australia) Adelaide
100m Breaststroke	1:01.58	2013 Australian Swimming Championships	(Australia) Adelaide

=== Short Course ===
Event	Time	Meet	Location	Notes
100m Medley	51.19	2013 FINA Swimming World Cup	(Qatar) Doha	AR
200m Medley	1:52.01	2013 FINA Swimming World Cup	(Germany) Berlin	AR
100m Freestyle	46.57	2013 FINA Swimming World Cup	(Germany) Berlin	
100m Butterfly	50.19	2012 FINA Swimming World Cup	(Australia) Adelaide	
100m Breaststroke	58.05	2013 FINA Swimming World Cup	(Qatar) Doha	

Sporting positions
Preceded by (South Africa) Chad le Clos	Male World Cup Overall Winner; 2012	Succeeded by (South Africa) Chad le Clos
