= Ekaterina Borovikova =

Russian freestyle swimmer (born 1991)

Personal information
- Full name: Ekaterina Pavlovna Borovikova
- Nationality: Russia
- Born: March 13, 1991 (age 35) Russia

Sport
- Sport: Swimming Freestyle
Medal record
Women's swimming
FINA Swimming World Cup
Gold medal – first place	2013 Moscow	4×50 m mixed medley
Open Russian Championships
Gold medal – first place	2008	4×100 m freestyle
European Junior Championships
Bronze medal – third place	2007 Antwerp	4×100 m freestyle

Ekaterina Pavlovna Borovikova (Russian: Екатерина Павловна Боровикова, romanized: Ekaterina Pavlovna Borovikova; born March 13, 1991) is a Russian freestyle swimmer, a former world record holder in the mixed 4×50 m freestyle relay. She holds the title of Master of Sports of Russia, champion and a many-time medalist at the Russian Swimming Championships.

Records
Preceded by (United States); Dustin Rhodes (25.54); Andrew Marciniak (27.68); Hailey Gordon (27.81); Olivia Kabacinski (26.58); September 26, 2013 – 1:49.87	World Record – Mixed 4×50 m Medley Relay (Short Course) (Russia); Sergey Makov (23.98); Andrey Grechin (26.90); Daria Tsvetkova (25.97); Ekaterina Borovikova (24.85); September 28, 2013 – 1:47.61	Succeeded by (France); Jérémy Stravius (23.15); Giacomo Perez Dortona (26.41); Mélanie Henique (25.45); Anna Santamans (24.53); October 20, 2013 – 1:39.54
