= 2013 FINA Swimming World Cup =

The 2013 FINA Swimming World Cup was a series of eight, two-day, short course meets in eight cities between August and November 2013. Arena was again the title sponsor for the series, with Omega serving as official timer.

== Meets ==
As of June 2013, the 2013 World Cup consists of the following eight meets:

| Meet | Dates | Location | Venue |
|---|---|---|---|
| 1 | August 7–8 | Eindhoven, Netherlands | Pieter van den Hoogenband Swimming Stadium |
| 2 | August 10–11 | Berlin, Germany | Schwimm- und Sprunghalle (Europapark) |
| 3 | October 12–13 | Moscow, Russia | Olimpiysky Sports Complex |
| 4 | October 17–18 | Dubai, United Arab Emirates | Dubai Sports Complex |
| 5 | October 20–21 | Doha, Qatar | Hamad Aquatic Centre |
| 6 | November 5–6 | Singapore | Singapore Sports School |
| 7 | November 9–10 | Tokyo, Japan | Tokyo Tatsumi International Swimming Center |
| 8 | November 13–14 | Beijing, China | Beijing National Aquatics Center |

== World Cup standings ==
- Composition of points:
  - Best performances (by meets): 1st place: 24 points, 2nd place: 18 points and 3rd place: 12 points;
  - Points for medals (in individual events): Gold medal: 12 points, Silver medal: 9 points and Bronze medal: 6 points;
  - Bonus for World Record (WR): 20 points.

=== Men ===
Official overall scoring:

| Rank | Name | Nationality | Points awarded (Bonus) | | | | | | | | Total |
| Rank | Name | Nationality | NED | GER | RUS | UAE | QAT | SIN | JPN | CHN | Total |
|---|---|---|---|---|---|---|---|---|---|---|---|
| 1 | Chad le Clos | South Africa | 54 (20) | 54 | 69 | 69 | 66 | 84 (20) | 75 | 63 | 574 |
| 2 | Vladimir Morozov | Russia | 33 | 54 | 54 | 54 | 45 | 63 | 42 | 69 | 414 |
| 3 | Robert Hurley | Australia | 21 | 24 | 51 | 45 | 39 | 36 | 36 | 33 | 285 |
| 4 | Roland Schoeman | South Africa | 21 | 36 | 33 | 24 | 33 | 21 | 18 | 27 | 213 |
| 5 | Kenneth To | Australia | 27 | 21 | 51 | 39 | 54 | - | - | - | 192 |
| 6 | Dániel Gyurta | Hungary | 39 | 45 | - | - | - | 36 | 45 | 24 | 189 |
| 7 | Thomas Shields | United States | 15 | 12 | 18 | 54 | 57 | - | 9 | 21 | 186 |
| 8 | Devon Myles Brown | South Africa | 18 | 6 | 30 | 24 | 27 | 18 | - | 21 | 144 |
| 9 | Paweł Korzeniowski | Poland | - | 15 | 24 | 15 | 21 | 18 | 6 | 12 | 111 |
| 9 | George Bovell | Trinidad and Tobago | 30 | 6 | 12 | 15 | 6 | 18 | 15 | 9 | 111 |
| 11 | Thomas Fraser-Holmes | Australia | - | - | - | - | - | 39 | 33 | 36 | 108 |
| 12 | Eugene Godsoe | United States | - | - | - | - | - | 36 | 24 | 36 | 96 |
| 13 | Michael Jamieson | United Kingdom | 6 | 6 | 18 | 21 | 12 | 6 | 6 | 9 | 84 |
| 14 | Ashley Delaney | Australia | 30 | - | 30 | 6 | 6 | - | - | 9 | 81 |
| 14 | Radosław Kawęcki | Poland | 12 | 21 | 6 | 24 | 18 | - | - | - | 81 |
| 16 | Anthony Ervin | United States | - | - | - | 15 | 15 | 15 | 15 | 9 | 69 |
| 17 | Dávid Verrasztó | Hungary | 6 | 6 | 12 | 18 | 15 | - | - | - | 57 |
| 18 | Steffen Deibler | Germany | 18 | 27 | 6 | - | - | - | - | - | 51 |
| 18 | Conor Dwyer | United States | 24 | 27 | - | - | - | - | - | - | 51 |
| 20 | Konrad Czerniak | Poland | - | - | 12 | 6 | 6 | 9 | 9 | 6 | 48 |
| 20 | Mitch Larkin | Australia | 6 | 12 | - | - | - | 15 | 15 | - | 48 |
| 22 | Nicholas Santos | Brazil | - | - | - | - | - | 6 | 9 | 30 | 45 |
| 22 | Kosuke Hagino | Japan | - | - | - | - | - | - | 45 | - | 45 |
| 24 | Oussama Mellouli | Tunisia | - | - | - | 18 | 15 | - | 9 | - | 42 |
| 24 | Daiya Seto | Japan | 12 | 24 | - | - | - | - | 6 | - | 42 |
| 24 | Gregorio Paltrinieri | Italy | 12 | 12 | - | 12 | 6 | - | - | - | 42 |
| 24 | Fabio Scozzoli | Italy | 21 | 21 | - | - | - | - | - | - | 42 |
| 28 | Christian Sprenger | Australia | - | - | - | - | - | 9 | 21 | 9 | 39 |
| 29 | Yannick Agnel | France | 24 | 12 | - | - | - | - | - | - | 36 |
| 30 | Tyler Clary | United States | 9 | 21 | - | - | - | - | - | - | 30 |
| 30 | James Magnussen | Australia | 21 | 9 | - | - | - | - | - | - | 30 |
| 30 | Wang Shun | China | - | - | - | - | - | 6 | 6 | 18 | 30 |

=== Women ===
Official overall scoring:

| Rank | Name | Nationality | Points awarded (Bonus) | | | | | | | | Total |
| Rank | Name | Nationality | NED | GER | RUS | UAE | QAT | SIN | JPN | CHN | Total |
|---|---|---|---|---|---|---|---|---|---|---|---|
| 1 | Katinka Hosszú | Hungary | 121 (40) | 81 (40) | 102 | 90 | 105 | 96 | 84 | 81 | 840 |
| 2 | Alia Atkinson | Jamaica | 30 | 27 | 21 | 57 | 39 | 54 | 27 | 33 | 288 |
| 3 | Mireia Belmonte | Spain | 15 | 42 (40) | 33 | 39 | 18 | 27 | 24 | 42 | 280 |
| 4 | Daryna Zevina | Ukraine | 12 | 12 | 42 | 42 | 51 | 12 | 30 | 27 | 228 |
| 5 | Yuliya Yefimova | Russia | - | - | 39 | 33 | 30 | 21 | 45 (20) | - | 188 |
| 6 | Sarah Sjöström | Sweden | 21 | 6 | 60 | - | - | 33 | 33 | 30 | 183 |
| 6 | Emily Seebohm | Australia | 33 | 30 | - | 42 | - | 36 | 21 | 21 | 183 |
| 8 | Alicia Coutts | Australia | - | - | - | - | - | 36 | 51 | 51 | 138 |
| 8 | Lauren Boyle | New Zealand | 36 | 30 | - | - | - | 24 | 24 | 24 | 138 |
| 10 | Ranomi Kromowidjojo | Netherlands | 42 (20) | 24 | - | 24 | 24 | - | - | - | 134 |
| 11 | Melanie Costa | Spain | 9 | 12 | 18 | 27 | 27 | 15 | 9 | 15 | 132 |
| 12 | Jeanette Ottesen | Denmark | 36 | 21 | - | 36 | - | - | - | - | 129 |
| 13 | Cate Campbell | Australia | - | - | - | - | - | 24 | 24 | 36 | 84 |
| 14 | Rūta Meilutytė | Lithuania | - | - | 60 (20) | - | - | - | - | - | 80 |
| 15 | Sophie Allen | United Kingdom | - | - | 18 | 9 | 18 | 12 | 6 | 15 | 78 |
| 16 | Dorothea Brandt | Germany | - | - | 15 | 15 | 9 | 6 | 15 | 9 | 69 |
| 17 | Elizabeth Simmonds | United Kingdom | - | - | - | - | - | 24 | 18 | 18 | 60 |
| 18 | Tao Li | Singapore | 9 | - | 15 | 15 | 9 | 9 | - | - | 57 |
| 18 | Femke Heemskerk | Netherlands | - | 21 | - | 18 | 18 | - | - | - | 57 |
| 20 | Emma McKeon | Australia | 15 | - | - | - | - | 24 | 15 | - | 54 |
| 20 | Rikke Møller Pedersen | Denmark | 21 | 33 | - | - | - | - | - | - | 54 |
| 22 | Sayaka Akase | Japan | - | - | 18 | 12 | 21 | - | - | - | 51 |
| 23 | Aya Terakawa | Japan | 24 | 24 | - | - | - | - | - | - | 48 |
| 24 | Miho Motegi | Japan | - | - | - | - | - | 18 | 15 | 12 | 45 |
| 25 | Miyu Otsuka | Japan | - | - | 9 | 12 | 15 | - | 6 | - | 42 |
| 25 | Aleksandra Urbanczyk | Poland | 9 | 9 | - | 12 | 12 | - | - | - | 42 |
| 27 | Inge Dekker | Netherlands | 6 | - | 9 | 6 | 6 | - | 6 | 6 | 39 |
| 28 | Zsuzsanna Jakabos | Hungary | 15 | 18 | - | - | - | - | - | - | 33 |
| 29 | Bronte Campbell | Australia | - | - | - | - | 9 | 9 | - | 12 | 30 |
| 30 | Ellen Gandy | Australia | 15 | 15 | - | - | - | - | - | - | 30 |

=== Event winners ===
==== 50 m freestyle ====
| Meet | Men | | | Women | | |
| Meet | Winner | Nationality | Time | Winner | Nationality | Time |
|---|---|---|---|---|---|---|
| Eindhoven | Vladimir Morozov | Russia | 20.66 | Ranomi Kromowidjojo | Netherlands | 23.24 WR |
| Berlin | Roland Schoeman | South Africa | 20.86 | Ranomi Kromowidjojo | Netherlands | 23.72 |
| Moscow | Vladimir Morozov | Russia | 20.59 | Sarah Sjöström | Sweden | 24.20 |
| Dubai | Vladimir Morozov | Russia | 20.66 | Ranomi Kromowidjojo | Netherlands | 24.02 |
| Doha | Vladimir Morozov | Russia | 21.03 | Ranomi Kromowidjojo | Netherlands | 23.69 |
| Singapore | Vladimir Morozov | Russia | 20.78 | Cate Campbell | Australia | 23.85 |
| Tokyo | Vladimir Morozov | Russia | 20.72 | Cate Campbell | Australia | 23.47 |
| Beijing | Vladimir Morozov | Russia | 20.91 | Cate Campbell | Australia | 23.65 |

==== 100 m freestyle ====
| Meet | Men | | | Women | | |
| Meet | Winner | Nationality | Time | Winner | Nationality | Time |
|---|---|---|---|---|---|---|
| Eindhoven | James Magnussen | Australia | 45.60 | Ranomi Kromowidjojo | Netherlands | 51.54 |
| Berlin | Vladimir Morozov | Russia | 45.74 | Ranomi Kromowidjojo | Netherlands | 51.28 |
| Moscow | Vladimir Morozov | Russia | 45.68 | Sarah Sjöström | Sweden | 51.93 |
| Dubai | Vladimir Morozov | Russia | 45.84 | Ranomi Kromowidjojo | Netherlands | 52.48 |
| Doha | Vladimir Morozov | Russia | 45.94 | Ranomi Kromowidjojo | Netherlands | 52.29 |
| Singapore | Vladimir Morozov | Russia | 45.67 | Cate Campbell | Australia | 51.67 |
| Tokyo | Vladimir Morozov | Russia | 45.65 | Cate Campbell | Australia | 51.31 |
| Beijing | Vladimir Morozov | Russia | 45.88 | Cate Campbell | Australia | 51.59 |

==== 200 m freestyle ====
| Meet | Men | | | Women | | |
| Meet | Winner | Nationality | Time | Winner | Nationality | Time |
|---|---|---|---|---|---|---|
| Eindhoven | Yannick Agnel | France | 1:42.33 | Sarah Sjöström | Sweden | 1:52.26 |
| Berlin | Yannick Agnel | France | 1:41.26 | Femke Heemskerk | Netherlands | 1:52.25 |
| Moscow | Paweł Korzeniowski | Poland | 1:44.12 | Sarah Sjöström | Sweden | 1:53.76 |
| Dubai | Robert Hurley | Australia | 1:44.12 | Katinka Hosszú | Hungary | 1:53.21 |
| Doha | Paweł Korzeniowski | Poland | 1:44.00 | Katinka Hosszú | Hungary | 1:53.53 |
| Singapore | Chad le Clos | South Africa | 1:42.29 | Emma McKeon | Australia | 1:52.40 |
| Tokyo | Thomas Fraser-Holmes | Australia | 1:42.56 | Katinka Hosszú | Hungary | 1:53.12 |
| Beijing | Thomas Fraser-Holmes | Australia | 1:43.09 | Katinka Hosszú | Hungary | 1:53.82 |

==== 400 m freestyle ====
| Meet | Men | | | Women | | |
| Meet | Winner | Nationality | Time | Winner | Nationality | Time |
|---|---|---|---|---|---|---|
| Eindhoven | Yannick Agnel | France | 3:37.75 | Lauren Boyle | New Zealand | 3:55.16 |
| Berlin | Tyler Clary | United States | 3:36.86 | Mireia Belmonte | Spain | 3:54.52 WR |
| Moscow | Devon Myles Brown | South Africa | 3:41.79 | Melanie Costa | Spain | 4:01.71 |
| Dubai | Robert Hurley | Australia | 3:40.24 | Melanie Costa | Spain | 4:00.39 |
| Doha | Robert Hurley | Australia | 3:39.59 | Melanie Costa | Spain | 3:59.88 |
| Singapore | Robert Hurley | Australia | 3:38.68 | Lauren Boyle | New Zealand | 4:00.78 |
| Tokyo | Thomas Fraser-Holmes | Australia | 3:38.39 | Lauren Boyle | New Zealand | 3:57.68 |
| Beijing | Thomas Fraser-Holmes | Australia | 3:39.86 | Shao Yiwen | China | 3:58.92 |

==== 1500 m (men)/800 m (women) freestyle ====
| Meet | Men | | | Women | | |
| Meet | Winner | Nationality | Time | Winner | Nationality | Time |
|---|---|---|---|---|---|---|
| Eindhoven | Gregorio Paltrinieri | Italy | 14:27.65 WC | Lauren Boyle | New Zealand | 8:01.22 (WC) |
| Berlin | Gregorio Paltrinieri | Italy | 14:30.74 | Mireia Belmonte | Spain | 7:59.34 WR |
| Moscow | Devon Myles Brown | South Africa | 14:43.52 | Mireia Belmonte | Spain | 8:19.55 |
| Dubai | Gregorio Paltrinieri | Italy | 14:36.25 | Mireia Belmonte | Spain | 8:14.12 |
| Doha | Devon Myles Brown | South Africa | 14:36.19 | Mireia Belmonte | Spain | 8:14.18 |
| Singapore | Devon Myles Brown | South Africa | 14:56.94 | Lauren Boyle | New Zealand | 8:10.80 |
| Tokyo | Kosuke Hagino | Japan | 14:32.88 | Lauren Boyle | New Zealand | 8:06.15 |
| Beijing | Devon Myles Brown | South Africa | 14:41.63 | Mireia Belmonte | Spain | 8:07.59 |

==== 50 m backstroke ====
| Meet | Men | | | Women | | |
| Meet | Winner | Nationality | Time | Winner | Nationality | Time |
|---|---|---|---|---|---|---|
| Eindhoven | Ashley Delaney | Australia | 23.28 | Aya Terakawa | Japan | 26.20 |
| Berlin | Robert Hurley | Australia | 23.20 | Aya Terakawa | Japan | 26.06 |
| Moscow | Robert Hurley | Australia | 23.44 | Daryna Zevina | Ukraine | 27.12 |
| Dubai | Robert Huelry | Australia | 23.31 | Aleksandra Urbanczyk | Poland | 26.70 |
| Doha | Jérémy Stravius | France | 22.99 | Aleksandra Urbanczyk | Poland | 26.49 |
| Singapore | Eugene Godsoe | United States | 23.12 | Emily Seebohm | Australia | 26.70 |
| Tokyo | Eugene Godsoe | United States | 23.07 | Etiene Medeiros | Brazil | 26.61 |
| Beijing | Eugene Godsoe | United States | 23.07 | Elizabeth Simmonds | United Kingdom | 26.83 |

==== 100 m backstroke ====
| Meet | Men | | | Women | | |
| Meet | Winner | Nationality | Time | Winner | Nationality | Time |
|---|---|---|---|---|---|---|
| Eindhoven | Ashley Delaney; Robert Hurley | Australia; Australia | 50.42 | Aya Terakawa | Japan | 56.34 |
| Berlin | Robert Hurley | Australia | 50.01 | Aya Terakawa | Japan | 56.10 |
| Moscow | Robert Hurley | Australia | 50.32 | Daryna Zevina | Ukraine | 56.91 |
| Dubai | Thomas Shields | United States | 50.15 | Sayaka Akase | Japan | 57.24 |
| Doha | Thomas Shields | United States | 50.23 | Daryna Zevina | Ukraine | 57.48 |
| Singapore | Eugene Godsoe | United States | 50.21 | Katinka Hosszú | Hungary | 57.04 |
| Tokyo | Eugene Godsoe | United States | 49.87 | Daryna Zevina | Ukraine | 56.87 |
| Beijing | Eugene Godsoe | United States | 50.15 | Emily Seebohm | Australia | 57.22 |

==== 200 m backstroke ====
| Meet | Men | | | Women | | |
| Meet | Winner | Nationality | Time | Winner | Nationality | Time |
|---|---|---|---|---|---|---|
| Eindhoven | Radosław Kawęcki | Poland | 1:48.54 | Daryna Zevina | Ukraine | 2:02.04 |
| Berlin | Radosław Kawęcki | Poland | 1:47.63 | Daryna Zevina | Ukraine | 2:00.81 |
| Moscow | Ashley Delaney | Australia | 1:54.21 | Daryna Zevina | Ukraine | 2:02.95 |
| Dubai | Radosław Kawęcki | Poland | 1:49.70 | Daryna Zevina | Ukraine | 2:01.66 |
| Doha | Radosław Kawęcki | Poland | 1:48.93 | Daryna Zevina | Ukraine | 2:01.17 |
| Singapore | Eugene Godsoe | United States | 1:50.56 | Daryna Zevina | Ukraine | 2:02.32 |
| Tokyo | Masaki Kaneko | Japan | 1:49.76 | Daryna Zevina | Ukraine | 2:01.70 |
| Beijing | Eugene Godsoe | United States | 1:51.29 | Daryna Zevina | Ukraine | 2:01.47 |

==== 50 m breaststroke ====
| Meet | Men | | | Women | | |
| Meet | Winner | Nationality | Time | Winner | Nationality | Time |
|---|---|---|---|---|---|---|
| Eindhoven | Roland Schoeman | South Africa | 25.86 | Alia Atkinson | Jamaica | 29.42 |
| Berlin | Roland Schoeman | South Africa | 25.65 | Alia Atkinson | Jamaica | 29.31 |
| Moscow | Roland Schoeman | South Africa | 25.83 | Rūta Meilutytė | Lithuania | 28.89 |
| Dubai | Roland Schoeman | South Africa | 25.96 | Yuliya Yefimova | Russia | 29.27 |
| Doha | Roland Schoeman | South Africa | 25.89 | Yuliya Yefimova | Russia | 29.22 |
| Singapore | Roland Schoeman | South Africa | 25.68 | Alia Atkinson | Jamaica | 28.94 |
| Tokyo | Roland Schoeman | South Africa | 26.12 | Yuliya Yefimova | Russia | 28.71 WR |
| Beijing | Roland Schoeman | South Africa | 25.95 | Alia Atkinson | Jamaica | 29.20 |

==== 100 m breaststroke ====
| Meet | Men | | | Women | | |
| Meet | Winner | Nationality | Time | Winner | Nationality | Time |
|---|---|---|---|---|---|---|
| Eindhoven | Fabio Scozzoli | Italy | 56.49 | Alia Atkinson | Jamaica | 1:03.90 |
| Berlin | Fabio Scozzoli | Italy | 56.58 | Rikke Møller Pedersen | Denmark | 1:03.74 |
| Moscow | Kenneth To | Australia | 58.42 | Rūta Meilutytė | Lithuania | 1:02.36 WR |
| Dubai | Kenneth To | Australia | 58.29 | Alia Atkinson | Jamaica | 1:02.91 |
| Doha | Vladimir Morozov | Russia | 57.53 | Alia Atkinson | Jamaica | 1:03.38 |
| Singapore | Dániel Gyurta | Hungary | 57.31 | Alia Atkinson | Jamaica | 1:03.48 |
| Tokyo | Christian Sprenger | Australia | 57.14 | Alia Atkinson | Jamaica | 1:02.99 |
| Beijing | Dániel Gyurta | Hungary | 57.34 | Alia Atkinson | Jamaica | 1:03.81 |

==== 200 m breaststroke ====
| Meet | Men | | | Women | | |
| Meet | Winner | Nationality | Time | Winner | Nationality | Time |
|---|---|---|---|---|---|---|
| Eindhoven | Dániel Gyurta | Hungary | 2:01.44 (WC) | Rikke Møller Pedersen | Denmark | 2:17.05 |
| Berlin | Dániel Gyurta | Hungary | 2:01.37 (WC) | Rikke Møller Pedersen | Denmark | 2:15.93 |
| Moscow | Vyacheslav Sinkevich | Russia | 2:05.61 | Yuliya Yefimova | Russia | 2:18.50 |
| Dubai | Michael Jamieson | United Kingdom | 2:06.68 | Yuliya Yefimova | Russia | 2:19.73 |
| Doha | Michael Jamieson | United Kingdom | 2:05.93 | Kanako Watanabe | Japan | 2:18.90 |
| Singapore | Dániel Gyurta | Hungary | 2:02.62 | Yuliya Yefimova | Russia | 2:18.33 |
| Tokyo | Dániel Gyurta | Hungary | 2:01.30 WC | Yuliya Yefimova | Russia | 2:17.37 |
| Beijing | Dániel Gyurta | Hungary | 2:03.09 | Mio Motegi | Japan | 2:20.23 |

==== 50 m butterfly ====
| Meet | Men | | | Women | | |
| Meet | Winner | Nationality | Time | Winner | Nationality | Time |
|---|---|---|---|---|---|---|
| Eindhoven | Steffen Deibler | Germany | 22.17 | Jeanette Ottesen | Denmark | 24.87 |
| Berlin | Roland Schoeman | South Africa | 22.05 | Ilaria Bianchi | Italy | 25.62 |
| Moscow | Roland Schoeman | South Africa | 22.36 | Sarah Sjöström | Sweden | 25.56 |
| Dubai | Roland Schoeman | South Africa | 22.27 | Jeanette Ottesen | Denmark | 25.03 |
| Doha | Roland Schoeman | South Africa | 22.30 | Jeanette Ottesen | Denmark | 25.06 |
| Singapore | Chad le Clos | South Africa | 22.24 | Sarah Sjöström | Sweden | 25.34 |
| Tokyo | Chad le Clos | South Africa | 22.26 | Sarah Sjöström | Sweden | 24.91 |
| Beijing | Nicholas Santos | Brazil | 22.13 | Sarah Sjöström | Sweden | 25.24 |

==== 100 m butterfly ====
| Meet | Men | | | Women | | |
| Meet | Winner | Nationality | Time | Winner | Nationality | Time |
|---|---|---|---|---|---|---|
| Eindhoven | Chad le Clos | South Africa | 49.08 | Jeanette Ottesen | Denmark | 55.97 |
| Berlin | Thomas Shields | United States | 49.01 | Jeanette Ottesen | Denmark | 55.94 |
| Moscow | Chad le Clos | South Africa | 49.34 | Sarah Sjöström | Sweden | 57.04 |
| Dubai | Chad le Clos | South Africa | 49.14 | Jeanette Ottesen | Denmark | 56.47 |
| Doha | Thomas Shields | United States | 48.80 | Jeanette Ottesen | Denmark | 56.74 |
| Singapore | Chad le Clos | South Africa | 50.04 | Katinka Hosszú | Hungary | 56.58 |
| Tokyo | Chad le Clos | South Africa | 49.01 | Alicia Coutts | Australia | 55.30 WC |
| Beijing | Chad le Clos | South Africa | 49.41 | Alicia Coutts | Australia | 56.00 |

==== 200 m butterfly ====
| Meet | Men | | | Women | | |
| Meet | Winner | Nationality | Time | Winner | Nationality | Time |
|---|---|---|---|---|---|---|
| Eindhoven | Chad le Clos | South Africa | 1:49.04 (WR) | Katinka Hosszú | Hungary | 2:03.67 |
| Berlin | Chad le Clos | South Africa | 1:49.90 | Katinka Hosszú | Hungary | 2:03.36 |
| Moscow | Chad le Clos | South Africa | 1:49.83 | Katinka Hosszú | Hungary | 2:06.80 |
| Dubai | Chad le Clos | South Africa | 1:49.07 | Katinka Hosszú | Hungary | 2:06.30 |
| Doha | Chad le Clos | South Africa | 1:50.39 | Katinka Hosszú | Hungary | 2:06.60 |
| Singapore | Chad le Clos | South Africa | 1:48.56 WR | Franziska Hentke | Germany | 2:04.42 |
| Tokyo | Chad le Clos | South Africa | 1:50.33 | Katinka Hosszú | Hungary | 2:04.03 |
| Beijing | Chad le Clos | South Africa | 1:51.70 | Mireia Belmonte | Spain | 2:04.20 |

==== 100 m individual medley ====
| Meet | Men | | | Women | | |
| Meet | Winner | Nationality | Time | Winner | Nationality | Time |
|---|---|---|---|---|---|---|
| Eindhoven | George Bovell | Trinidad and Tobago | 51.15 | Katinka Hosszú | Hungary | 57.50 (WR) |
| Berlin | Vladimir Morozov | Russia | 51.13 | Katinka Hosszú | Hungary | 57.74* |
| Moscow | Vladimir Morozov | Russia | 51.61 | Rūta Meilutytė | Lithuania | 58.57 |
| Dubai | Kenneth To | Australia | 51.64 | Alia Atkinson | Jamaica | 58.45 |
| Doha | Kenneth To | Australia | 51.19 | Katinka Hosszú | Hungary | 58.43 |
| Singapore | Vladimir Morozov | Russia | 51.36 | Katinka Hosszú | Hungary | 58.29 |
| Tokyo | Kosuke Hagino | Japan | 51.58 | Katinka Hosszú; Alicia Coutts | Hungary; Australia | 57.53 |
| Beijing | Vladimir Morozov | Russia | 50.97 | Alicia Coutts | Australia | 58.08 |

* Katinka Hosszú set a new World record of 57.45 seconds in the heats of this event in Berlin.

==== 200 m individual medley ====
| Meet | Men | | | Women | | |
| Meet | Winner | Nationality | Time | Winner | Nationality | Time |
|---|---|---|---|---|---|---|
| Eindhoven | Kenneth To | Australia | 1:52.40 | Katinka Hosszú | Hungary | 2:03.20 WR |
| Berlin | Kenneth To | Australia | 1:52.01 | Katinka Hosszú | Hungary | 2:03.25 |
| Moscow | Chad le Clos | South Africa | 1:53.04 | Katinka Hosszú | Hungary | 2:06.86 |
| Dubai | Chad le Clos | South Africa | 1:53.21 | Katinka Hosszú | Hungary | 2:06.58 |
| Doha | Chad le Clos | South Africa | 1:53.32 | Katinka Hosszú | Hungary | 2:05.45 |
| Singapore | Chad le Clos | South Africa | 1:53.36 | Katinka Hosszú | Hungary | 2:05.33 |
| Tokyo | Kosuke Hagino | Japan | 1:51.50 WC | Katinka Hosszú | Hungary | 2:04.52 |
| Beijing | Chad le Clos | South Africa | 1:52.60 | Katinka Hosszú | Hungary | 2:05.34 |

==== 400 m individual medley ====
| Meet | Men | | | Women | | |
| Meet | Winner | Nationality | Time | Winner | Nationality | Time |
|---|---|---|---|---|---|---|
| Eindhoven | Daiya Seto | Japan | 4:00.37 | Katinka Hosszú | Hungary | 4:22.18 (WC) |
| Berlin | Daiya Seto | Japan | 3:58.84 WC | Katinka Hosszú | Hungary | 4:20.85 WR |
| Moscow | Dávid Verrasztó | Hungary | 4:06.92 | Katinka Hosszú | Hungary | 4:30.65 |
| Dubai | Dávid Verrasztó | Hungary | 4:05.30 | Katinka Hosszú | Hungary | 4:29.09 |
| Doha | Chad le Clos | South Africa | 4:03.23 | Katinka Hosszú | Hungary | 4:28.91 |
| Singapore | Thomas Fraser-Holmes | Australia | 4:01.98 | Katinka Hosszú | Hungary | 4:27.60 |
| Tokyo | Chad le Clos | South Africa | 3:59.23 | Katinka Hosszú | Hungary | 4:25.97 |
| Beijing | Thomas Fraser-Holmes | Australia | 4:04.05 | Mireia Belmonte | Spain | 4:25.23 |

Legend: WR – World record; (WR) – World record when swum (earning bonus World Cup points); WC – World Cup record; (WC) – World Cup record when swum

==== Mixed 4x50m freestyle relay ====
| Meet | Winner | |
| Meet | Team | Time |
|---|---|---|
| Eindhoven | Australia (Matthew Abood, James Magnussen, Brittany Elmslie, Emma McKeon) | 1:29.31 |
| Berlin | Netherlands (Sebastiaan Verschuren, Femke Heemskerk, Ranomi Kromowidjojo, Jasper van Mierlo) | 1:30.33 |
| Moscow | Russia (Rozaliya Nasretdinova, Dmitry Ermakov, Artem Lobuzov, Maria Reznikova) | 1:33.01 |
| Dubai | Japan (Shinri Shioura, Sayaka Akase, Kenta Ito, Kanako Watanabe) | 1:32.52 |
| Doha | France (Florent Manaudou, Jérémy Stravius, Mélanie Henique, Anna Santamans) | 1:31.14 |
| Singapore | Brazil (Nicholas Santos, Fernando Silva, Larissa Oliveira, Graciele Herrmann) | 1:31.20 |
| Tokyo | Australia (Tommaso D'Orsogna, Travis Mahoney, Cate Campbell, Bronte Campbell) | 1:29.61 |
| Beijing | Australia (Tommaso D'Orsogna, Travis Mahoney, Cate Campbell, Bronte Campbell) | 1:30.52 |

==== Mixed 4x50m medley relay ====
| Meet | Winner | |
| Meet | Team | Time |
|---|---|---|
| Eindhoven | Germany (Theresa Michalak, Hendrik Feldwehr, Steffen Deibler, Dorothea Brandt) | 1:39.38 |
| Berlin | Australia (Robert Hurley, Kenneth To, Ellen Gandy, Emma McKeon) | 1:40.95 |
| Moscow | Russia (Sergey Makov, Andrey Grechin, Daria Tsvetkova, Ekaterina Borovikova) | 1:41.70 |
| Dubai | Australia (Robert Hurley, Kenneth To, Belinda Hocking, Emily Seebohm) | 1:42.31 |
| Doha | France (Jérémy Stravius, Giacomo Perez-Dortona, Mélanie Henique, Anna Santamans) | 1:39.54 |
| Singapore | Australia (Robert Hurley, Christian Sprenger, Alicia Coutts, Cate Campbell) | 1:38.02 |
| Tokyo | Australia (Robert Hurley, Christian Sprenger, Alicia Coutts, Cate Campbell) | 1:37.84 |
| Beijing | Australia (Robert Hurley, Christian Sprenger, Alicia Coutts, Cate Campbell) | 1:38.23 |

NOTE: The mixed relay is not included in the overall scoring of the World Cup.
