= Siberian Academy of Physical Culture =

University in Omsk, Russia

Coordinates: 54.9756°N 73.4342°E

Siberian State University of Physical Culture and Sport a (Russian: Сибирский государственный университет физической культуры и спорта), shortly named as SibGUFK, is a university located in Omsk, Russia.

== History ==
The university was founded in 1950 and originally named as Omsk State Institute of Physical Culture. The first building given to the Institute was not applicable for sport needs at all because there were no gymnasium and lecture hall.

In 1994 the institute was renamed into Siberian State Academy of Physical Culture and Sport. In 2003 it has got the status of university. During the all years the university has trained about 40 000 specialists, among which there are more than 50 winners and medalists of The Olympic Games. The most famous are such sportsmen, as Sergey Shelpakov (the Moscow Olympic Games 100 kilometers team race winner), Yuri Muchin (the Barcelona Olympic Games 4 × 200 meter freestyle relay winner), Alexey Tishchenko (the Athens Olympic Games featherweight boxing winner and the Beijing Olympic Games lightweight boxing winner), Alexander Bessmertnykh (the Sochi Olympic Games men's team relay silver medalist) and others.

== Faculties ==
The university provides Bachelor programs, Master's programs and postgraduate (PhD) programs. There are 4 faculties in the university:

- Faculty of Physical Culture
- Faculty of Sports
- Faculty of Science and Education
- Faculty of Correspondent and Distance Learning

== Campus ==
The University Campus includes three dormitories, two of them were renovated.
