= 2012 FINA Swimming World Cup =

The 2012 FINA Swimming World Cup was a series of eight, two-day, short course meets in eight cities in October and November 2012. Arena was again the title sponsor for the series, with Omega serving as official timer.

== Meets ==
The 2012 World Cup consisted of the following eight meets:

Meet	Dates	Location	Venue
1	October 2–3	Dubai, United Arab Emirates	Dubai Sports Complex
2	October 6–7	Doha, Qatar	Hamad Aquatic Centre
3	October 13–14	Stockholm, Sweden	Eriksdalsbadet
4	October 17–18	Moscow, Russia	Olimpiysky Sports Complex
5	October 20–21	Berlin, Germany	Schwimm- und Sprunghalle (Europapark)
6	November 2–3	Beijing, China	Beijing National Aquatics Center
7	November 6–7	Tokyo, Japan	Tokyo Tatsumi International Swimming Center
8	November 10–11	Singapore	Singapore Sports School

== World Cup Standings ==
=== Men ===
Official Overall Scoring:

Rank	Name	Nationality	Points awarded (Bonus)								Total
Rank	Name	Nationality	UAE	QAT	SWE	RUS	GER	CHN	JPN	SIN	Total
1	Kenneth To	Australia	25	25	20	20	20	25	10	50	195
2	George Bovell	Trinidad and Tobago	13	13	25	16	25	20	13	32	157
3	Stanislav Donets	Russia	7	3	5	25	13	13	25	40	131
4	Daiya Seto	Japan	16	20	16	13	16		16		97
5	Kazuya Kaneda	Japan			10	10		16	20	20	76
6	Robert Hurley	Australia	1	7	7	3		10	3	26	57
7	Chad le Clos	South Africa	20	16							36
8	Darian Townsend	South Africa	1	7	7			2	7	4	28
9	László Cseh	Hungary			13	1	5				19
10	Matthew Targett	Australia			2	5	10				17
11	Anthony Ervin	United States	3				3			10	16
12	Nikolay Skvortsov	Russia				7	7				14
13	Christian Sprenger	Australia								14	14
14	Roland Schoeman	South Africa		10							10
15	Shun Wang	China						7			7
16	Kosuke Hagino	Japan	5						1		6
17	Ashley Delaney	Australia								6	6
18	Cameron van der Burgh	South Africa		5							5
19	Junya Koga	Japan							5		5
20	Michael Klueh	United States						5			5
21	Thomas Shields	United States		1	1		1				3
22	Matthew Stanley	New Zealand						3			3
23	Yannick Agnel	France					2				2
24	Akihiro Yamaguchi	Japan							2		2
25	Sean Mahoney	United States				2					2
26	Marco Koch	Germany	2								2
27	Cameron McEvoy	Australia								2	2
28	Kyle Richardson	Australia						1			1

=== Women ===
Official Overall Scoring:

Rank	Name	Nationality	Points awarded (Bonus)								Total
Rank	Name	Nationality	UAE	QAT	SWE	RUS	GER	CHN	JPN	SIN	Total
1	Katinka Hosszú	Hungary	25	20	25	25	10	16	25	40	186
2	Zsuzsanna Jakabos	Hungary	3	16	13	13	5	13	16	50	129
3	Britta Steffen	Germany	10	5	20	10		7	13	32	97
4	Sophie Allen	United Kingdom			10	7	20		20		57
5	Daryna Zevina	Ukraine	20	25							45
6	Therese Alshammar	Sweden	7	13	16						36
7	Leah Smith	United States				20	13				33
8	Rachel Goh	Australia	13		1			3	10	6	33
9	Rebecca Mann	United States				16	16				32
10	Melissa Ingram	New Zealand	16	10	2					4	32
11	Angie Bainbridge	Australia								25	25
12	Camille Muffat	France					25				25
13	Ye Shiwen	China						25			25
14	Kotuku Ngawati	Australia						2		20	22
15	Shao Yiwen	China						20			20
16	Rie Kaneto	Japan				2		3	10		15
17	Jessica Hardy	United States					7		5	2	14
18	Alana Bowles	Australia								14	14
19	Theresa Michalak	Germany			3	5	2				10
20	Jessica Pengelly	South Africa								10	10
21	Hang Yu Sze	Hong Kong	5	3							8
22	Rikke Møller Pedersen	Denmark							7		7
23	Rūta Meilutytė	Lithuania			7						7
24	Michelle Coleman	Sweden		7							7
25	Yan Siyu	China						5			5
26	Hannah Miley	United Kingdom			5						5
27	Ilaria Bianchi	Italy				3	1				4
28	Moi Motegi	Japan							3		3
29	Qiu Yuhan	China						2			2
30	Inge Dekker	Netherlands		1					1		2
31	Tanja Šmid	Slovenia		2							2
32	Jennie Johansson	Sweden	2								2
33	Zhou Yanxin	China						1			1
34	Elena Sokolova	Russia				1					1
35	Hanna Dzerkal	Ukraine	1								1

(*) including 20 points for WR bonus

=== Event winners ===
==== 50 m freestyle ====
Meet	Men			Women		
Meet	Winner	Nationality	Time	Winner	Nationality	Time
Dubai	Anthony Ervin	United States	21.18	Therese Alshammar	Sweden	24.50
Doha	Anthony Ervin	United States	21.02	Therese Alshammar	Sweden	24.44
Stockholm	George Bovell	Trinidad and Tobago	20.82	Britta Steffen	Germany	24.08
Moscow	George Bovell	Trinidad and Tobago	20.90	Britta Steffen	Germany	24.20
Berlin	Anthony Ervin	United States	20.85	Britta Steffen	Germany	24.16
Beijing	George Bovell	Trinidad and Tobago	20.98	Yin Fan	China	24.47
Tokyo	George Bovell	Trinidad and Tobago	20.94	Britta Steffen	Germany	24.01
Singapore	Anthony Ervin	United States	20.99	Britta Steffen	Germany	24.10

==== 100 m freestyle ====
Meet	Men			Women		
Meet	Winner	Nationality	Time	Winner	Nationality	Time
Dubai	Kenneth To	Australia	46.89	Britta Steffen	Germany	53.39
Doha	Tommaso D'Orsogna	Australia	47.10	Britta Steffen	Germany	53.40
Stockholm	Tommaso D'Orsogna	Australia	47.05	Britta Steffen	Germany	52.46
Moscow	Tommaso D'Orsogna	Australia	47.11	Britta Steffen	Germany	52.92
Berlin	Anthony Ervin	United States	46.71	Britta Steffen	Germany	52.88
Beijing	Tommaso D'Orsogna	Australia	47.06	Britta Steffen	Germany	52.78
Tokyo	Anthony Ervin	United States	47.09	Britta Steffen	Germany	52.42
Singapore	Tommaso D'Orsogna	Australia	47.03	Britta Steffen	Germany	52.38

==== 200 m freestyle ====
Meet	Men			Women		
Meet	Winner	Nationality	Time	Winner	Nationality	Time
Dubai	Darian Townsend	South Africa	1:42.71	Katinka Hosszú	Hungary	1:55.97
Doha	Tommaso D'Orsogna	Australia	1:43.84	Katinka Hosszú	Hungary	1:54.79
Stockholm	Darian Townsend	South Africa	1:43.45	Katinka Hosszú	Hungary	1:55.30
Moscow	Darian Townsend	South Africa	1:44.26	Katinka Hosszú	Hungary	1:55.46
Berlin	Yannick Agnel	France	1:42.10	Camille Muffat	France	1:52.28
Beijing	Tommaso D'Orsogna	Australia	1:43.20	Shao Yiwen	China	1:55.13
Tokyo	Darian Townsend	South Africa	1:43.31	Katinka Hosszú	Hungary	1:54.94
Singapore	Cameron McEvoy	Australia	1:43.40	Katinka Hosszú	Hungary	1:53.57

==== 400 m freestyle ====
Meet	Men			Women		
Meet	Winner	Nationality	Time	Winner	Nationality	Time
Dubai	Kosuke Hagino	Japan	3:40.77	Katinka Hosszú	Hungary	4:04.43
Doha	Robert Hurley	Australia	3:42.89	Katinka Hosszú	Hungary	4:04.24
Stockholm	Robert Hurley	Australia	3:43.75	Katinka Hosszú	Hungary	4:03.83
Moscow	Paul Biedermann	Germany	3:44.00	Elena Sokolova	Russia	4:04.83
Berlin	Paul Biedermann	Germany	3:42.21	Camille Muffat	France	3:54.93 WC
Beijing	Matthew Stanley	New Zealand	3:40.74	Shao Yiwen	China	4:00.56
Tokyo	Michael Klueh	United States	3:40.23	Melissa Ingram	New Zealand	4:05.22
Singapore	Robert Hurley	Australia	3:41.01	Angie Bainbridge	Australia	4:04.01

==== 1500 m (men)/800 m (women) freestyle ====
Meet	Men			Women		
Meet	Winner	Nationality	Time	Winner	Nationality	Time
Dubai	Gergő Kis	Hungary	15:00.65	Katinka Hosszú	Hungary	8:31.70
Doha	Wang Kecheng	China	14:43.83	Katinka Hosszú	Hungary	8:29.31
Stockholm	Lucas Kanieski	Brazil	14:46.68	Katinka Hosszú	Hungary	8:24.48
Moscow	Daiya Seto	Japan	15:03.02	Leah Smith	United States	8:19.24
Berlin	Dávid Verrasztó	Hungary	14:51.29	Rebecca Mann	United States	8:16.58
Beijing	Michael Klueh	United States	14:39.12	Katinka Hosszú	Hungary	8:21.49
Tokyo	Michael Klueh	United States	14:38.64	Katinka Hosszú	Hungary	8:24.89
Singapore	Mack Horton	Australia	14:54.25	Katinka Hosszú	Hungary	8:21.94

==== 50 m backstroke ====
Meet	Men			Women		
Meet	Winner	Nationality	Time	Winner	Nationality	Time
Dubai	Stanislav Donets	Russia	23.47	Rachel Goh	Australia	27.02
Doha	Stanislav Donets	Russia	23.49	Noriko Inada	Japan	27.29
Stockholm	Stanislav Donets	Russia	23.51	Rachel Goh	Australia	26.94
Moscow	Stanislav Donets	Russia	23.31	Rachel Goh	Australia	26.87
Berlin	Stanislav Donets	Russia	23.16	Rachel Goh	Australia	26.80
Beijing	Stanislav Donets	Russia	23.14	Rachel Goh	Australia	26.66
Tokyo	Stanislav Donets	Russia	23.25	Noriko Inada	Japan	26.99
Singapore	Stanislav Donets	Russia	23.22	Rachel Goh	Australia	27.06

==== 100 m backstroke ====
Meet	Men			Women		
Meet	Winner	Nationality	Time	Winner	Nationality	Time
Dubai	Stanislav Donets	Russia	50.62	Rachel Goh	Australia	57.67
Doha	Robert Hurley	Australia	50.18	Daryna Zevina	Ukraine	57.90
Stockholm	Robert Hurley	Australia	50.38	Rachel Goh	Australia	57.52
Moscow	Stanislav Donets	Russia	49.74	Rachel Goh	Australia	57.80
Berlin	Stanislav Donets	Russia	50.02	Rachel Goh	Australia	57.02
Beijing	Stanislav Donets	Russia	50.07	Rachel Goh	Australia	57.07
Tokyo	Stanislav Donets	Russia	49.49	Grace Loh	Australia	57.71
Singapore	Stanislav Donets	Russia	49.82	Rachel Goh	Australia	57.34

==== 200 m backstroke ====
Meet	Men			Women		
Meet	Winner	Nationality	Time	Winner	Nationality	Time
Dubai	Radosław Kawęcki	Poland	1:51.03	Daryna Zevina	Ukraine	2:05.01
Doha	Radosław Kawęcki	Poland	1:50.89	Daryna Zevina	Ukraine	2:02.99
Stockholm	Yuki Shirai	Japan	1:50.70	Melissa Ingram	New Zealand	2:04.84
Moscow	Yuki Shirai	Japan	1:50.80	Melissa Ingram	New Zealand	2:05.35
Berlin	Yuki Shirai	Japan	1:49.94	Melissa Ingram	New Zealand	2:04.28
Beijing	Yuki Shirai	Japan	1:51.04	Zhou Yanxin	China	2:04.81
Tokyo	Yuki Shirai	Japan	1:49.69	Melissa Ingram	New Zealand	2:05.39
Singapore	Yuki Shirai	Japan	1:50.70	Melissa Ingram	New Zealand	2:04.93

==== 50 m breaststroke ====
Meet	Men			Women		
Meet	Winner	Nationality	Time	Winner	Nationality	Time
Dubai	Cameron van der Burgh	South Africa	26.64	Jennie Johansson	Sweden	30.62
Doha	Cameron van der Burgh	South Africa	25.95	Jennie Johansson	Sweden	30.69
Stockholm	Glenn Snyders	New Zealand	26.61	Rūta Meilutytė	Lithuania	29.96
Moscow	Fabio Scozzoli	Italy	26.51	Jessica Hardy	United States	30.29
Berlin	Fabio Scozzoli	Italy	26.31	Jessica Hardy	United States	30.13
Beijing	Glenn Snyders	New Zealand	26.64	Jennie Johansson	Sweden	30.41
Tokyo	Christian Sprenger	Australia	26.62	Jessica Hardy	United States	29.92
Singapore	Christian Sprenger	Australia	26.69	Jessica Hardy	United States	29.96

==== 100 m breaststroke ====
Meet	Men			Women		
Meet	Winner	Nationality	Time	Winner	Nationality	Time
Dubai	Cameron van der Burgh	South Africa	58.33	Jennie Johansson	Sweden	1:06.27
Doha	Cameron van der Burgh	South Africa	57.22	Jennie Johansson	Sweden	1:06.11
Stockholm	Glenn Snyders	New Zealand	57.87	Rūta Meilutytė	Lithuania	1:05.02
Moscow	Fabio Scozzoli	Italy	58.32	Rie Kaneto	Japan	1:06.18
Berlin	Fabio Scozzoli	Italy	57.61	Jessica Hardy	United States	1:04.58
Beijing	Glenn Snyders	New Zealand	57.96	Sarah Katsoulis	Australia	1:05.30
Tokyo	Glenn Snyders	New Zealand	57.98	Jessica Hardy	United States	1:04.86
Singapore	Christian Sprenger	Australia	57.46	Jessica Hardy	United States	1:05.58

==== 200 m breaststroke ====
Meet	Men			Women		
Meet	Winner	Nationality	Time	Winner	Nationality	Time
Dubai	Marco Koch	Germany	2:05.26	Fumiko Kawanabe	Japan	2:23.01
Doha	Daiya Seto	Japan	2:04.87	Fumiko Kawanabe	Japan	2:22.59
Stockholm	Marco Koch	Germany	2:06.09	Rie Kaneto	Japan	2:21.09
Moscow	Sean Mahoney	United States	2:05.11	Rie Kaneto	Japan	2:20.08
Berlin	Sean Mahoney	United States	2:04.55	Rie Kaneto	Japan	2:19.96
Beijing	Sean Mahoney	United States	2:06.38	Rie Kaneto	Japan	2:19.33
Tokyo	Akihiro Yamaguchi	Japan	2:04.64	Rie Kaneto	Japan	2:18.38
Singapore	Sean Mahoney	United States	2:06.17	Rie Kaneto	Japan	2:20.18

==== 50 m butterfly ====
Meet	Men			Women		
Meet	Winner	Nationality	Time	Winner	Nationality	Time
Dubai	Jason Dunford	Kenya	22.77	Therese Alshammar	Sweden	25.56
Doha	Roland Schoeman	South Africa	22.34	Therese Alshammar	Sweden	25.62
Stockholm	Matthew Targett	Australia	22.51	Therese Alshammar	Sweden	25.64
Moscow	Matthew Targett	Australia	22.56	Inge Dekker	Netherlands	25.65
Berlin	Matthew Targett	Australia	22.30	Ilaria Bianchi	Italy	25.96
Beijing	Jason Dunford	Kenya	23.14	Inge Dekker	Netherlands	25.64
Tokyo	Jason Dunford	Kenya	23.03	Jeanette Ottesen Gray	Denmark	25.48
Singapore	Zhang Qibin	China	23.09	Jeanette Ottesen Gray	Denmark	25.42

==== 100 m butterfly ====
Meet	Men			Women		
Meet	Winner	Nationality	Time	Winner	Nationality	Time
Dubai	Chad le Clos	South Africa	49.82	Therese Alshammar	Sweden	57.91
Doha	Chad le Clos	South Africa	49.60	Therese Alshammar	Sweden	57.22
Stockholm	Kenneth To	Australia	50.19	Therese Alshammar	Sweden	56.68
Moscow	Evgeny Korotyshkin	Russia	50.56	Ilaria Bianchi	Italy	57.18
Berlin	Thomas Shields	United States	50.03	Ilaria Bianchi	Italy	56.86
Beijing	Kenneth To	Australia	50.96	Inge Dekker	Netherlands	57.62
Tokyo	Zhang Qibin	China	50.53	Inge Dekker	Netherlands	57.39
Singapore	Zhang Qibin	China	50.58	Jeanette Ottesen Gray	Denmark	57.75

==== 200 m butterfly ====
Meet	Men			Women		
Meet	Winner	Nationality	Time	Winner	Nationality	Time
Dubai	Chad le Clos	South Africa	1:51.61	Katinka Hosszú	Hungary	2:10.43
Doha	Daiya Seto	Japan	1:51.30	Katinka Hosszú	Hungary	2:09.31
Stockholm	Kazuya Kaneda	Japan	1:51.95	Zsuzsanna Jakabos	Hungary	2:06.90
Moscow	Kazuya Kaneda	Japan	1:52.43	Katinka Hosszú	Hungary	2:05.77
Berlin	Nikolay Skvortsov	Russia	1:51.77	Katinka Hosszú	Hungary	2:05.78
Beijing	Kazuya Kaneda	Japan	1:51.22	Katinka Hosszú	Hungary	2:06.02
Tokyo	Kazuya Kaneda	Japan	1:51.08	Katinka Hosszú	Hungary	2:05.90
Singapore	Kazuya Kaneda	Japan	1:52.23	Katinka Hosszú	Hungary	2:05.85

==== 100 m individual medley ====
Meet	Men			Women		
Meet	Winner	Nationality	Time	Winner	Nationality	Time
Dubai	Kenneth To	Australia	51.43	Katinka Hosszú	Hungary	1:00.75
Doha	Kenneth To	Australia	51.58	Katinka Hosszú	Hungary	59.74
Stockholm	George Bovell	Trinidad and Tobago	51.56	Katinka Hosszú	Hungary	59.71
Moscow	Kenneth To	Australia	51.66	Katinka Hosszú	Hungary	59.69
Berlin	George Bovell	Trinidad and Tobago	51.20	Theresa Michalak	Germany	59.62
Beijing	Kenneth To	Australia	51.58	Katinka Hosszú	Hungary	59.90
Tokyo	George Bovell	Trinidad and Tobago	51.80	Sophie Allen	United Kingdom	59.50
Singapore	Kenneth To	Australia	51.50	Zsuzsanna Jakabos	Hungary	59.73

==== 200 m individual medley ====
Meet	Men			Women		
Meet	Winner	Nationality	Time	Winner	Nationality	Time
Dubai	Darian Townsend	South Africa	1:53.25	Katinka Hosszú	Hungary	2:10.53
Doha	Darian Townsend	South Africa	1:53.75	Katinka Hosszú	Hungary	2:09.86
Stockholm	Darian Townsend	South Africa	1:53.66	Katinka Hosszú	Hungary	2:08.13
Moscow	Daiya Seto	Japan	1:53.93	Katinka Hosszú	Hungary	2:08.28
Berlin	Darian Townsend	South Africa	1:53.44	Sophie Allen	United Kingdom	2:07.52
Beijing	Darian Townsend	South Africa	1:54.25	Ye Shiwen	China	2:06.10
Tokyo	Daiya Seto	Japan	1:52.48	Katinka Hosszú	Hungary	2:07.51
Singapore	Darian Townsend	South Africa	1:54.16	Zsuzsanna Jakabos	Hungary	2:06.41

==== 400 m individual medley ====
Meet	Men			Women		
Meet	Winner	Nationality	Time	Winner	Nationality	Time
Dubai	Daiya Seto	Japan	4:02.64	Katinka Hosszú	Hungary	4:31.34
Doha	Daiya Seto	Japan	4:02.51	Katinka Hosszú	Hungary	4:30.03
Stockholm	Daiya Seto	Japan	4:00.85	Katinka Hosszú	Hungary	4:28.01
Moscow	Daiya Seto	Japan	4:01.30	Katinka Hosszú	Hungary	4:30.14
Berlin	Daiya Seto	Japan	4:00.12 (WC)	Katinka Hosszú	Hungary	4:28.88
Beijing	Yang Zhixian	China	4:05.62	Ye Shiwen	China	4:26.93
Tokyo	Daiya Seto	Japan	4:00.02 WC	Katinka Hosszú	Hungary	4:28.14
Singapore	Darian Townsend	South Africa	4:09.24	Katinka Hosszú	Hungary	4:27.96

Legend: WR – World record; (WR) – World record when swum (earning bonus World Cup points); WC – World Cup record; (WC) – World Cup record when swum

==== Mixed 4x50m freestyle relay ====
Meet	Winner	
Meet	Team	Time
Dubai	Hungary (Krisztián Takács, László Cseh, Zsuzsanna Jakabos, Katinka Hosszú)	1:35.44
Doha	Hungary (Krisztián Takács, László Cseh, Zsuzsanna Jakabos, Katinka Hosszú)	1:35.56
Stockholm	Finland (Laura Kurki, Hanna-Maria Seppälä, Toni Kurkinen, Ari-Pekka Liukkonen)	1:32.75
Moscow	Russia (Evgeny Lagunov, Oleg Tikhobaev, Svetlana Knyaginina, Veronika Popova)	1:33.25
Berlin	United States (Anthony Ervin, Thomas Shields, Jessica Hardy, Kylie Stewart)	1:31.16
Beijing	China (Shi Yang, Lü Zhiwu, Wang Haibing, Tang Yi)	1:34.71
Tokyo	Japan (Takuya Amagai, Ren Sato, Akane Hoshi, Katsumi Nakamura)	1:37.12
Singapore	China (Liu Junwu, Liu Lan, Zheng Yanan, Zhang Qibin)	1:34.20

==== Mixed 4x50m medley relay ====
Meet	Winner	
Meet	Team	Time
Dubai	Germany (Jenny Mensing, Marco Koch, Helge Meeuw, Britta Steffen)	1:43.21
Doha	Germany (Jenny Mensing, Marco Koch, Helge Meeuw, Britta Steffen)	1:43.38
Stockholm	Norway (Lavrans Solli, Aleksander Hetland, Ingvild Snildal, Henriette Brekke)	1:41.83
Moscow	United States (Kylie Stewart, Jessica Hardy, Thomas Shields, Anthony Ervin)	1:40.87
Berlin	United States (Kylie Stewart, Jessica Hardy, Thomas Shields, Anthony Ervin)	1:40.49
Beijing	China (Cheng Feiyi, Li Xiayan, Liu Zige, Tang Yi)	1:43.04
Tokyo	Japan (Naoya Seino, Naka Sano, Ayaka Komatsubara, Kenta Ito)	1:43.50
Singapore	Australia (Angie Bainbridge, Christian Sprenger, Christopher Wright, Melanie Schlanger)	1:42.10

NOTE: The mixed relay is not included in the overall scoring of the World Cup.
