= List of Turkish records in swimming =

The list of Turkish records in swimming is ratified by the Turkish Swimming Federation.

== Long course (50 m) ==
=== Men ===
Event	Time		Name	Club	Date	Meet	Location	Ref
50 m freestyle	22.05		Emre Sakçı	Turkey	16 December 2023	Greek Winter Championships	Athens, Greece	
100 m freestyle	49.13		Doğa Çelik	Galatasaray	3 July 2013	Turkish Championships	Istanbul, Turkey	
200 m freestyle	1:45.68		Ahmet Boylu	Turkey	8 July 2026	European Junior Championships	Munich, Germany	
400 m freestyle	3:48.53		Ahmet Isik	Turkey	7 July 2024	European Junior Championships	Vilnius, Lithuania	
800 m freestyle	7:45.13	h	Kuzey Tunçelli	Turkey	29 July 2025	World Championships	Singapore, Singapore	
1500 m freestyle	14:41.22		Kuzey Tunçelli	Turkey	4 August 2024	Olympic Games	Paris, France	
50m backstroke	24.84	h	Mert Ali Satir	Turkey	9 May 2026	Acropolis Open	Athens, Greece	
100m backstroke	54.44		Mert Ali Satir	Turkey	10 May 2026	Acropolis Open	Athens, Greece	
200m backstroke	1:57.36	tt	Berke Saka	Galatasaray	24 April 2021	Turkish Championships	Edirne, Turkey	
50m breaststroke	26.71		Emre Sakçı	Fenerbahçe	21 May 2026	Turkish Club Championships	İzmir, Turkey	
100m breaststroke	58.85	h	Emre Sakçı	Fenerbahçe	3 August 2019	Turkish Summer Championships	Istanbul, Turkey	
200m breaststroke	2:09.43		Doruk Yogurtcuoglu	Turkey	10 July 2026	European Junior Championships	Munich, Germany	
50m butterfly	23.52		Berk Özkul	Fenerbahçe	18 May 2025	Turkish Age Championships	Bursa, Turkey	
100m butterfly	51.91	tt	Ümitcan Güreş	Fenerbahçe	23 April 2021	Turkish Championships	Edirne, Turkey	
200m butterfly	1:56.41		Polat Turnali	Turkey	10 April 2024	Hungarian Championships	Budapest, Hungary	
200m individual medley	1:58.20		Berke Saka	Galatasaray	4 August 2023	Turkish Summer Championships	Edirne, Turkey	
400m individual medley	4:20.98		Sanberk Yigit Oktar	Zafer	23 December 2022	Turkish Winter Championships	Istanbul, Turkey	
4×100m freestyle relay	3:17.94		Doğa Çelik (49.24); Kemal Arda Gürdal (49.12); Iskender Baslakov (49.71); Emre Sakçı (49.87)	Turkey	27 May 2016	Turkish Championships	Mersin, Turkey	
4×200m freestyle relay	7:19.28		Ahmet Boylu (1:47.67); Kuzey Tunçelli (1:50.06); Tuncer Erturk (1:50.88); Ozgur Yonca (1:50.67)	Turkey	22 August 2025	World Junior Championships	Otopeni, Romania	
4×200m freestyle relay	7:18.82	h, #	Ahmet Boylu (1:48.73); Ege Kocak (1:48.35); Berke Saka (1:49.23); Taylan Uygur (1:52.51)	Turkey	10 August 2026	European Championships	Paris, France	
4×100m medley relay	3:35.98	tt	Berke Saka (55.14); Berkay Öğretir (58.57); Ümitcan Güreş (52.08); Emre Sakçı (50.19)	Turkey	27 May 2021	National Team Selection	Edirne, Turkey	

Legend: # – Record awaiting ratification by Türkiye Yüzme Federasyonu; WR – World record; ER – European record;
Records not set in finals: h – heat; sf – semifinal; r – relay 1st leg; rh – relay heat 1st leg; b – B final; † – en route to final mark; so – swim-off; tt – time trial

=== Women ===
Event	Time		Name	Club	Date	Meet	Location	Ref
50m freestyle	25.22		Burcu Dolunay	Galatasaray	5 May 2012	Turkish Championships	Istanbul, Turkey	
100m freestyle	54.68	tt	Selen Özbilen	Fenerbahçe	25 June 2021	Turkish Summer Championships	Edirne, Turkey	
200m freestyle	1:58.24	tt	Gizem Güvenç	Fenerbahçe	13 March 2020	Turkish Championships	Edirne, Turkey	
400m freestyle	4:06.25		Merve Tuncel	Turkey	11 July 2021	European Junior Championships	Rome, Italy	
800m freestyle	8:21.91		Merve Tuncel	Turkey	7 July 2021	European Junior Championships	Rome, Italy	
1500m freestyle	15:55.23		Merve Tuncel	Turkey	10 July 2021	European Junior Championships	Rome, Italy	
50m backstroke	28.41		Ekaterina Avramova	Galatasaray	28 May 2016	Turkish Championships	Mersin, Turkey	
100m backstroke	1:00.48	tt	Ekaterina Avramova	Turkey	24 June 2021	Turkish Summer Championships	Edirne, Turkey	
200m backstroke	2:11.18	tt	Ekaterina Avramova	Enka	14 March 2020	Turkish Championships	Edirne, Turkey	
50m breaststroke	30.55	sf	Viktoriya Zeynep Güneş	Turkey	25 August 2015	World Junior Championships	Singapore, Singapore	
100m breaststroke	1:06.77		Viktoriya Zeynep Güneş	Turkey	28 August 2015	World Junior Championships	Singapore, Singapore	
200m breaststroke	2:19.64		Viktoriya Zeynep Güneş	Turkey	30 August 2015	World Junior Championships	Singapore, Singapore	
50m butterfly	26.17		Aleyna Özkan	Turkey	13 August 2023	European U-23 Championships	Dublin, Ireland	
100m butterfly	59.54		Aleyna Özkan	Fenerbahçe	7 August 2023	Turkish Summer Championships	Istanbul, Turkey	
200m butterfly	2:09.34		Deniz Ertan	Fenerbahçe	16 July 2022	Turkish Summer Championships	Istanbul, Turkey	
200m individual medley	2:11.03		Viktoriya Zeynep Güneş	Turkey	28 August 2015	World Junior Championships	Singapore, Singapore	
400m individual medley	4:39.53		Viktoriya Zeynep Güneş	Turkey	31 March 2016	Stockholm Open	Stockholm, Sweden	
4×100m freestyle relay	3:43.03	h	Selen Özbilen (55.30); Gizem Güvenç (55.63); Viktoriya Zeynep Güneş (55.89); Ekaterina Avramova (56.21)	Turkey	21 July 2019	World Championships	Gwangju, South Korea	
4×200m freestyle relay	8:01.58		Gizem Güvenç (1:59.26); Ela Ozdemir (2:00.48); Ecem Donmez (2:00.99); Zehra Bilgin (2:00.85)	Turkey	17 June 2024	European Championships	Belgrade, Serbia	
4×100m medley relay	4:04.01	h	Ekaterina Avramova (1:01.25); Viktoriya Zeynep Güneş (1:07.38); Nida Eliz Üstündağ (1:00.62); Selen Özbilen (54.76)	Turkey	23 May 2021	European Championships	Budapest, Hungary	

Legend: # – Record awaiting ratification by Türkiye Yüzme Federasyonu; WR – World record; ER – European record;
Records not set in finals: h – heat; sf – semifinal; r – relay 1st leg; rh – relay heat 1st leg; b – B final; † – en route to final mark; so – swim-off; tt – time trial

=== Mixed relay ===
Event	Time		Name	Club	Date	Meet	Location	Ref
4×100m freestyle relay	3:30.51	h	Doga Celik (49.53); Kemal Arda Gürdal (49.72); Ilknur Nihan Cakici (55.88); Ekaterina Avramova (55.38)	Turkey	20 May 2016	European Championships	London, Great Britain	
4×200m freestyle relay	7:44.02		Baturalp Ünlü (1:48.08); Efe Turan (1:50.43); Merve Tuncel (2:01.99); Deniz Ertan (2:03.52)	Turkey	18 May 2021	European Championships	Budapest, Hungary	
4×100m medley relay	3:50.49	h	Ekaterina Avramova (1:02.53); Berkay Öğretir (1:00.39); Ümitcan Güreş (52.47); Selen Özbilen (55.10)	Turkey	24 July 2019	World Championships	Gwangju, South Korea	

Legend: # – Record awaiting ratification by Türkiye Yüzme Federasyonu; WR – World record; ER – European record;
Records not set in finals: h – heat; so – swim-off

== Short course (25 m) ==
=== Men ===
Event	Time		Name	Club	Date	Meet	Location	Ref
50m freestyle	21.10	r	Emre Sakçı	Fenerbahçe	27 December 2021	Turkish Championships	Gaziantep, Turkey	
100m freestyle	46.63	r	Emre Sakçı	Fenerbahçe	26 December 2021	Turkish Championships	Gaziantep, Turkey	
200m freestyle	1:42.92	r	Baturalp Ünlü	Fenerbahçe	26 December 2022	Turkish Championships	Istanbul, Turkey	
400m freestyle	3:41.60		Baturalp Ünlü	Fenerbahçe	29 December 2022	Turkish Championships	Istanbul, Turkey	
800m freestyle	7:38.76	†	Kuzey Tunçelli	Turkey	10 December 2024	World Championships	Budapest, Hungary	
1500m freestyle	14:20.64		Kuzey Tunçelli	Turkey	10 December 2024	World Championships	Budapest, Hungary	
50m backstroke	23.48		İskender Başlakov	Fenerbahçe	18 December 2015	Turkish Championships	Istanbul, Turkey	
100m backstroke	50.76		İskender Başlakov	Turkey	13 December 2012	World Championships	Istanbul, Turkey	
200m backstroke	1:51.08	h	Derya Büyükuncu	Turkey	10 December 2009	European Championships	Istanbul, Turkey	
50m breaststroke	24.95	WR	Emre Sakçı	Fenerbahçe	27 December 2021	Turkish Championships	Gaziantep, Turkey	
100m breaststroke	55.74		Emre Sakçı	Iron	10 November 2020	International Swimming League	Budapest, Hungary	
200m breaststroke	2:03.78		Berkay Öğretir	Galatasaray	22 December 2020	Turkish Championships	Istanbul, Turkey	
50m butterfly	22.37		Ümitcan Güreş	Turkey	6 November 2021	European Championships	Kazan, Russia	
100m butterfly	49.77		Ümitcan Güreş	Turkey	5 December 2019	European Championships	Glasgow, Great Britain	
200m butterfly	1:53.55		Eren Kuru	Fenerbahçe	11 August 2025	National Team Selection	Istanbul, Turkey	
100m individual medley	51.14		Emre Sakçı	Fenerbahçe	23 December 2023	Turkish Championships	Istanbul, Turkey	
200m individual medley	1:52.25		Berke Saka	Turkey	6 December 2025	European Championships	Lublin, Poland	
400m individual medley	4:09.79		Samet Alkan	Galatasaray	26 December 2022	Turkish Championships	Istanbul, Turkey	
4×50m freestyle relay	1:25.94	=	Emre Gürdenli (21.69); Efe Hacısalihoğlu (21.23); Demir Özdemir (21.63); Berke Saka (21.39)	Galatasaray	26 December 2025	Turkish Championships	Antalya, Turkey	
4×50m freestyle relay	1:25.94	=	Arda Akkoyun (21.88); Mehmet Koçak (21.88); Efe Saraç (21.21); Emre Sakçı (20.97)	Fenerbahçe	26 December 2025	Turkish Championships	Antalya, Turkey	
4×100m freestyle relay	3:11.19		Emre Gürdenli (47.96); Demir Özdemir (47.80); Ahmet Boylu (47.82); Berke Saka (47.61)	Galatasaray	24 December 2025	Turkish Championships	Antalya, Turkey	
4×200m freestyle relay	7:03.31		Ahmet Boylu (1:45.86); Ahmet Isik (1:45.66); Utku Kurtdere (1:45.51); Berke Saka (1:46.28)	Galatasaray	25 December 2024	Turkish Championships	Gaziantep, Turkey	
4×50m medley relay	1:32.82		İskender Başlakov (23.65); Emre Sakçı (25.40); Ümitcan Güreş (22.21); Jerome Basikoglu (21.56)	Turkey	8 December 2019	European Championships	Glasgow, Great Britain	
4×100m medley relay	3:27.52		Mert Ali Satir (51.87); Berkay Öğretir (57.27); Yavuz Ağa (51.02); Emre Sakçı (47.36)	Fenerbahçe	27 December 2025	Turkish Championships	Antalya, Turkey	

Legend: # – Record awaiting ratification by Türkiye Yüzme Federasyonu; WR – World record; ER – European record;
Records not set in finals: h – heat; sf – semifinal; r – relay 1st leg; rh – relay heat 1st leg; b – B final; † – en route to final mark; so – swim-off; tt – time trial

=== Women ===
Event	Time		Name	Club	Date	Meet	Location	Ref
50m freestyle	24.62	so	Burcu Dolunay	Turkey	25 November 2012	European Championships	Chartres, France	
100m freestyle	53.36	r	Gizem Güvenç	Fenerbahçe	24 December 2024	Turkish Championships	Gaziantep, Turkey	
200m freestyle	1:55.91		Gizem Güvenç	Fenerbahçe	21 December 2019	Turkish Championships	Istanbul, Turkey	
400m freestyle	4:02.47		Merve Tuncel	Turkey	7 November 2021	European Championships	Kazan, Russia	
800m freestyle	8:17.12		Merve Tuncel	Turkey	3 November 2021	European Championships	Kazan, Russia	
1500m freestyle	15:45.29		Merve Tuncel	Enka	22 December 2020	Turkish Championships	Istanbul, Turkey	
50m backstroke	27.02		Ekaterina Avramova	Enka	26 December 2021	Turkish Championships	Gaziantep, Turkey	
100m backstroke	57.96		Ekaterina Avramova	Enka	20 December 2019	Turkish Championships	Istanbul, Turkey	
200m backstroke	2:05.36		Ekaterina Avramova	Enka	19 December 2019	Turkish Championships	Istanbul, Turkey	
50m breaststroke	30.28		Viktoriya Zeynep Güneş	Turkey	2 December 2015	European Championships	Netanya, Israel	
100m breaststroke	1:05.06	sf	Viktoriya Zeynep Güneş	Turkey	4 December 2015	European Championships	Netanya, Israel	
200m breaststroke	2:19.73		Viktoriya Zeynep Güneş	Turkey	6 December 2015	European Championships	Netanya, Israel	
50m butterfly	25.95	h	Aleyna Özkan	Fenerbahçe	1 August 2023	National Team Selection	Istanbul, Turkey	
100m butterfly	58.09		Aleyna Özkan	Fenerbahçe	2 August 2023	National Team Selection	Istanbul, Turkey	
200m butterfly	2:06.87		Nida Eliz Üstündağ	Turkey	15 December 2017	European Championships	Copenhagen, Denmark	
100m individual medley	59.36		Viktoriya Zeynep Güneş	Enka	27 December 2021	Turkish Championships	Gaziantep, Turkey	
200m individual medley	2:06.72		Viktoriya Zeynep Güneş	Turkey	30 October 2021	World Cup	Kazan, Russia	
400m individual medley	4:28.93		Viktoriya Zeynep Güneş	Energy Standard	19 November 2021	International Swimming League	Eindhoven, Netherlands	
4×50m freestyle relay	1:40.00		Selen Özbilen (25.04); Gizem Güvenç (25.34); Sila Bilgi (25.71); Sezin Eligül (23.91)	Fenerbahçe	20 December 2020	Turkish Championships	Istanbul, Turkey	
4×100m freestyle relay	3:38.57		Gizem Güvenç (54.15); Sezin Eligül (54.41); Selen Özbilen (54.20); Zehra Duru Bilgin (55.81)	Fenerbahçe	20 December 2019	Turkish Championships	Istanbul, Turkey	
4×200m freestyle relay	7:56.94		Meriç Demirtepe (2:00.93); Gizem Güvenç (1:58.88); Deniz Ertan (1:59.38); Ecem Dönmez (1:57.75)	Fenerbahçe	25 December 2025	Turkish Championships	Antalya, Turkey	
4×50m medley relay	1:48.99	h	Ekaterina Avramova (27.78); Viktoriya Zeynep Güneş (30.33); Gizem Çam (26.52); İlknur Nihan Çakıcı (24.36)	Turkey	6 December 2015	European Championships	Netanya, Israel	
4×100m medley relay	3:58.94		Ekaterina Avramova (58.22); Viktoriya Zeynep Güneş (1:05.18); Imge Roza Erdemli (1:00.45); Ilknur Nihan Çakici (55.09)	Enka	28 December 2021	Turkish Championships	Gaziantep, Turkey	

Legend: # – Record awaiting ratification by Türkiye Yüzme Federasyonu; WR – World record; ER – European record;
Records not set in finals: h – heat; sf – semifinal; r – relay 1st leg; rh – relay heat 1st leg; b – B final; † – en route to final mark; so – swim-off; tt – time trial

=== Mixed relay ===
Event	Time		Name	Club	Date	Meet	Location	Ref
4×50m freestyle relay	1:32.92	h	Emre Sakçı (21.54); Kemal Arda Gürdal (21.35); Selen Özbilen (25.03); Ekaterina Avramova (25.00)	Turkey	12 December 2018	World Championships	Hangzhou, China	
4×50m medley relay	1:40.51	h	Iskender Baslakov (23.62); Emre Sakçı (26.00); Aleyna Özkan (26.37); Selen Özbilen (24.52)	Turkey	13 December 2018	World Championships	Hangzhou, China	

Legend: # – Record awaiting ratification by Türkiye Yüzme Federasyonu;
Records not set in finals: h – heat; so – swim-off
