= Swimming at the European Youth Summer Olympic Festival =

Swimming has featured as a sport at the European Youth Summer Olympic Festival since its first edition in 1991. It has appeared on the programme at every subsequent edition of the biennial multi-sport event for European athletes under the age of 18.

== Editions ==
| Edition | Year | Host city | Host country | Best nation |
|---|---|---|---|---|
| I | 1991 | Brussels | Belgium | France |
| II | 1993 | Valkenswaard | Netherlands | Russia |
| III | 1995 | Bath | United Kingdom | Great Britain |
| IV | 1997 | Lisbon | Portugal | |
| V | 1999 | Esbjerg | Denmark | |
| VI | 2001 | Murcia | Spain | |
| VII | 2003 | Paris | France | |
| VIII | 2005 | Lignano Sabbiadoro | Italy | |
| IX | 2007 | Belgrade | Serbia | |
| X | 2009 | Tampere | Finland | |
| XI | 2011 | Trabzon | Turkey | Russia |
| XII | 2013 | Utrecht | Netherlands | Russia |
| XIII | 2015 | Tbilisi | Georgia | Hungary |
| XIV | 2017 | Győr | Hungary | Russia |
| XV | 2019 | Baku | Azerbaijan | Russia |
| XVI | 2022 | Banská Bystrica | Slovakia | Italy |
| XVII | 2023 | Maribor | Slovenia | Italy |

== Festival records ==
=== Boys ===
| Event | Time | Name | Nationality | Date | Meet | Location | Ref |
|---|---|---|---|---|---|---|---|
| 50m freestyle | 22.69 | Justin Cvetkov | Serbia | 27 July 2023 | 2023 Festival | Maribor, Slovenia | |
| 100m freestyle | 49.78 | Carlos D'Ambrosio | Italy | 26 July 2023 | 2023 Festival | Maribor, Slovenia | |
| 200m freestyle | 1:49.20 | Alexei Sancov | Moldova | 27 July 2015 | 2015 Festival | Tbilisi, Georgia (country) | |
| 400m freestyle | 3:51.29 | Emir Batur Albayrak | Turkey | 24 July 2023 | 2023 Festival | Maribor, Slovenia | |
| 1500m freestyle | 14:54.16 | Kuzey Tunçelli | Turkey | 25 July 2023 | 2023 Festival | Maribor, Slovenia | |
| 100m backstroke | 55.22 | Aleksei Tkachev | Russia | 23 July 2019 | 2019 Festival | Baku, Azerbaijan | |
| 200m backstroke | 2:01.24 | Aleksei Tkachev | Russia | 25 July 2019 | 2019 Festival | Baku, Azerbaijan | |
| 100m breaststroke | 1:01.75 | Nicolò Martinenghi | Italy | 27 July 2015 | 2015 Festival | Tbilisi, Georgia (country) | |
| 200m breaststroke | 2:15.14 | Nicolò Martinenghi | Italy | 27 July 2015 | 2015 Festival | Tbilisi, Georgia (country) | |
| 100m butterfly | 52.06 | Andrey Minakov | Russia | 25 July 2017 | 2017 Festival | Győr, Hungary | |
| 200m butterfly | 1:58.06 | Vadim Klimenishchev | Russia | 24 July 2019 | 2019 Festival | Baku, Azerbaijan | |
| 200m individual medley | 2:01.55 | Ilya Borodin | Russia | 24 July 2019 | 2019 Festival | Baku, Azerbaijan | |
| 400m individual medley | 4:18.80 | Robert Badea | Romania | 28 July 2023 | 2023 Festival | Maribor, Slovenia | |
| 4×100m freestyle relay | 3:24.14 | Alessandro Ragaini (51.85); Davide Passafaro (50.72); Lorenzo Ballarati (50.85); Filippo Bertoni (50.72) | Italy | 27 July 2022 | 2022 Festival | Banská Bystrica, Slovakia | |
| 4×100m medley relay | 3:42.41 | Daniele del Signore (55.56); Lorenzo Fuschini (1:03.35); Riccardo Santiago Osio (54.12); Carlos D'Ambrosio (49.38) | Italy | 28 July 2023 | 2023 Festival | Maribor, Slovenia | |

Legend: # – Record awaiting ratification by European Olympic Committees;
Records not set in finals: h – heat; sf – semifinal; r – relay 1st leg; rh – relay heat 1st leg; † – en route to final mark

=== Girls ===
| Event | Time | Name | Nationality | Date | Meet | Location | Ref |
|---|---|---|---|---|---|---|---|
| 50m freestyle | 25.34 | Bianca Costea | Romania | 26 July 2019 | 2019 Festival | Baku, Azerbaijan | |
| 100m freestyle | 54.98 | Alessandra Mao | Italy | 22 July 2025 | 2025 Festival | Skopje, North Macedonia | |
| 200m freestyle | 2:00.13 | Alessandra Mao | Italy | 24 July 2025 | 2025 Festival | Skopje, North Macedonia | |
| 400m freestyle | 4:09.71 | Beril Böcekler | Turkey | 23 July 2019 | 2019 Festival | Baku, Azerbaijan | |
| 800m freestyle | 8:32.65 | Beril Böcekler | Turkey | 26 July 2019 | 2019 Festival | Baku, Azerbaijan | |
| 100m backstroke | 1:00.87 | Daria Vaskina | Russia | 25 July 2017 | 2017 Festival | Győr, Hungary | |
| 200m backstroke | 2:11.20 | Katie Shanahan | Great Britain | 23 July 2019 | 2019 Festival | Baku, Azerbaijan | |
| 100m breaststroke | 1:07.96 | Rūta Meilutytė | Lithuania | 29 July 2011 | 2011 Festival | Trabzon, Turkey | |
| 200m breaststroke | 2:24.15 | Evgenia Chikunova | Russia | 24 July 2019 | 2019 Festival | Baku, Azerbaijan | |
| 100m butterfly | 59.07 | Aleksandra Sabitova | Russia | 25 July 2019 | 2019 Festival | Baku, Azerbaijan | |
| 200m butterfly | 2:11.26 | Blanka Berecz | Hungary | 24 July 2017 | 2017 Festival | Győr, Hungary | |
| 200m individual medley | 2:14.10 | Katie Shanahan | Great Britain | 26 July 2019 | 2019 Festival | Baku, Azerbaijan | |
| 400m individual medley | 4:43.92 | Katie Shanahan | Great Britain | 22 July 2019 | 2019 Festival | Baku, Azerbaijan | |
| 4×100m freestyle relay | 3:45.10 | Aleksandra Sabitova (56.44); Daria Trofimova (55.50); Daria Klepikova (56.20); Aleksandra Kurilkina (56.96) | Russia | 24 July 2019 | 2019 Festival | Baku, Azerbaijan | |
| 4×100m medley relay | 4:07.55 | Renata Gainullina (1:03.51); Evgenia Chikunova (1:08.60); Aleksandra Sabitova (59.24); Daria Trofimova (56.20) | Russia | 26 July 2019 | 2019 Festival | Baku, Azerbaijan | |

Legend: # – Record awaiting ratification by European Olympic Committees;
Records not set in finals: h – heat; sf – semifinal; r – relay 1st leg; rh – relay heat 1st leg; † – en route to final mark

=== Mixed ===
| Event | Time | Name | Nationality | Date | Meet | Location | Ref |
|---|---|---|---|---|---|---|---|
| 4×100m freestyle relay | 3:32.48 | Jacob Whittle (50.45); Edward Mildred (50.72); Tamryn Van Selm (55.57); Evelyn Davis (55.74) | Great Britain | 23 July 2019 | 2019 Festival | Baku, Azerbaijan | |
| 4×100m medley relay | 3:51.98 | Daria Vaskina (1:01.87); Vladislav Gerasimenko (1:01.09); Andrey Minakov (53.00); Polina Nevmovenko (56.02) | Russia | 25 July 2017 | 2017 Festival | Győr, Hungary | |

Legend: # – Record awaiting ratification by European Olympic Committees;
Records not set in finals: h – heat
