= Swimming at the 2019 European Youth Summer Olympic Festival =

- Venue: Baku Aquatics Center
- Dates: 22–26 July

Swimming at the 2019 European Youth Summer Olympic Festival was held at the Baku Aquatics Center in Baku, Azerbaijan, from 22 to 26 July 2019.

== Medalists ==
=== Boys ===
Event	Gold		Silver		Bronze	
50 m freestyle	Mateusz Chowaniec; Poland	22.91	David Popovici; Romania	23.03	Tim Korstanje; Netherlands	23.08
100 m freestyle	David Popovici; Romania	49.82; EYOF	Jacob Whittle; Great Britain	49.99	Rasmus Nickelsen; Denmark	50.22
200 m freestyle	Edward Mildred; Great Britain	1:49.33	David Popovici; Romania	1:50.93	Bora Gülşen; Turkey	1:51.33
400 m freestyle	Franko Grgić; Croatia	3:52.10	Silas Beth; Germany	3:52.63	Alexandros Kachris; Greece	3:53.53
1500 m freestyle	Franko Grgić; Croatia	15:04.75; EYOF	Dávid Betlehem; Hungary	15:20.58	Silas Beth; Germany	15:20.58
100 m backstroke	Aleksei Tkachev; Russia	55.22; EYOF	Hubert Kós; Hungary	56.36	Adam Maraana; Israel	56.63
200 m backstroke	Aleksei Tkachev; Russia	2:01.24; EYOF	Berke Saka; Turkey	2:01.62	Filip Kosiński; Poland	2:02.79
100 m breaststroke	Rostyslav Kryzhanivskyy; Ukraine	1:02.36	Cameron Williams; Great Britain	1:03.15	Brendan Fitzpatrick; France	1:03.22
200 m breaststroke	Dmitrii Askhabov; Russia	2:16.30	Rostyslav Kryzhanivskyy; Ukraine	2:16.60	Brendan Fitzpatrick; France	2:17.30
100 m butterfly	Rasmus Nickelsen; Denmark	52.95	Hubert Kós; Hungary	53.54	Paweł Uryniuk; Poland	54.73
200 m butterfly	Vadim Klimenishchev; Russia	1:58.06; EYOF	Edward Mildred; Great Britain	1:58.64	Krzysztof Chmielewski; Poland	2:01.82
200 m individual medley	Ilya Borodin; Russia	2:01.55; EYOF	Hubert Kós; Hungary	2:02.60	Berke Saka; Turkey	2:03.25
400 m individual medley	Ilya Borodin; Russia	4:20.05; EYOF	Hubert Kós; Hungary	4:20.90	Jakub Bursa; Czech Republic	4:24.21
4 × 100 m freestyle relay	Great Britain; Edward Mildred (50.86); Nicholas Skelton (52.73); Mark Ford (53.21); Jacob Whittle (49.91); Pierce Greening^{[a]}	3:26.71	Russia; Andrey Chulkov (51.70); Aleksei Tkachev (52.45); Vadim Klimenishchev (51.49); Ilya Borodin (51.50)	3:27.14	Turkey; Batuhan Filiz (53.15); Efe Hacısalihoğlu (51.81); Yiğit Aslan (52.36); Bora Gülşen (50.77)	3:28.09
4 × 100 m medley relay	Russia; Aleksei Tkachev (55.91); Ilya Shilkin (1:02.78); Andrey Chulkov (54.01); Vadim Klimenishchev (50.93); Dmitrii Askhabov^{[a]}	3:43.63	Great Britain; Mark Ford (57.70); Cameron Williams (1:02.98); Edward Mildred (53.92); Jacob Whittle (49.85); William Ellington^{[a]} Nicholas Skelton^{[a]}	3:44.45	France; Maximilien Hugot (56.78); Brendan Fitzpatrick (1:01.99); Lucas Peley (56.02); Nathan Hudan (51.37)	3:46.16

^{a} Swimmers who participated in the heats only and received medals.

=== Women ===
Event	Gold		Silver		Bronze	
50 m freestyle	Bianca Costea; Romania	25.34; EYOF	Nina Stanisavljević; Serbia	25.70	Milou van Wijk; Netherlands	25.76
100 m freestyle	Aleksandra Sabitova; Russia	55.58; EYOF	Tamryn Van Selm; Great Britain	55.61	Carmen Weiler; Spain	56.25
200 m freestyle	Beril Böcekler; Turkey	2:00.62	Freya Colbert; Great Britain	2:00.90	Wiktoria Guść; Poland	2:02.36
400 m freestyle	Beril Böcekler; Turkey	4:09.71; EYOF	Freya Colbert; Great Britain	4:16.58	Margarita Varulnikova; Russia	4:17.15
800 m freestyle	Beril Böcekler; Turkey	8:32.65; EYOF	Freya Colbert; Great Britain	8:46.37	Merve Tuncel; Turkey	8:47.47
100 m backstroke	Erika Gaetani; Italy	1:01.17	Lucie Mosdzien; Germany	1:02.46	Renata Gainullina; Russia Evgeniya Zhukova; Ukraine	1:02.85
200 m backstroke	Katie Shanahan; Great Britain	2:11.20; EYOF	Erika Gaetani; Italy	2:12.03	Sudem Denizli; Turkey	2:13.51
100 m breaststroke	Evgenia Chikunova; Russia	1:08.03	Justine Delmas; France	1:09.55	Molly Mayne; Ireland	1:09.59
200 m breaststroke	Evgenia Chikunova; Russia	2:24.15; EYOF	Justine Delmas; France	2:27.50	Molly Mayne; Ireland	2:30.76
100 m butterfly	Aleksandra Sabitova; Russia	59.07; EYOF	Roos Vanotterdijk; Belgium	59.33	Amelie Zachenhuber; Germany	1:00.01
200 m butterfly	Sofia Sartori; Italy	2:11.76	Merve Tuncel; Turkey	2:12.39	Sophie Freeman; Great Britain	2:12.95
200 m individual medley	Katie Shanahan; Great Britain	2:14.10; EYOF	Chiara Fontana; Italy	2:18.58	Deniz Ertan; Turkey	2:19.25
400 m individual medley	Katie Shanahan; Great Britain	4:43.92; EYOF	Lia Csulák; Hungary	4:50.50	Chiara Fontana; Italy	4:52.21
4 × 100 m freestyle relay	Russia; Aleksandra Sabitova (56.44); Daria Trofimova (55.50); Daria Klepikova (56.20); Aleksandra Kurilkina (56.96); Anastasia Markova^{[a]} Margarita Varulnikova^{[a]}	3:45.10; EYOF	Great Britain; Evelyn Davis (56.84); Katie Shanahan (57.27); Freya Colbert (57.57); Tamryn Van Selm (55.94); Sophie Freeman^{[a]}	3:47.62	Hungary; Réka Nyirádi (57.63); Lora Kontér (57.43); Mira Szimcsák (56.94); Laura Veres (56.67); Beatrix Tankó^{[a]}	3:48.67
4 × 100 m medley relay	Russia; Renata Gainullina (1:03.51); Evgenia Chikunova (1:08.60); Aleksandra Sabitova (59.24); Daria Trofimova (56.20); Daria Klepikova^{[a]} Aleksandra Kurilkina^{[a]}	4:07.55; EYOF	Great Britain; Katie Shanahan (1:03.07); Jemimah Berkeley (1:11.39); Sophie Freeman (1:00.35); Tamryn Van Selm (54.64); Evelyn Davis^{[a]}	4:09.45	Italy; Erika Gaetani (1:01.93); Sofia Bartoloni (1:11.87); Sofia Sartori (59.95); Gaia Pesenti (56.19)	4:09.94

^{a} Swimmers who participated in the heats only and received medals.

=== Mixed ===
Event	Gold		Silver		Bronze	
4 × 100 m freestyle relay	Great Britain; Jacob Whittle (50.45); Edward Mildred (50.72); Tamryn Van Selm (55.57); Evelyn Davis (55.74)	3:32.48; EYOF	Russia; Andrey Chulkov (51.69); Aleksei Tkachev (51.95); Daria Trofimova (55.67); Aleksandra Sabitova (55.31); Vadim Klimenishchev^{[a]} Aleksandra Kurilkina^{[a]} Daria Klepikova^{[a]}	3:34.62	Germany; Manuel Kohlschmid (52.21); Timo Sorgius (50.95); Amelie Zachenhuber ( 56.80); Chiara Klein (56.16); Silas Beth^{[a]}	3:36.12
4 × 100 m medley relay	Russia; Aleksei Tkachev (56.35); Evgenia Chikunova (1:07.21); Aleksandra Sabitova (59.05); Ilya Borodin (51.66); Dmitrii Askhabov^{[a]} Daria Klepikova^{[a]} Daria Trofimova^{[a]}	3:54.27	Great Britain; Katie Shanahan (1:02.92); Cameron Williams (1:03.56); Sophie Freeman (1:00.68); Jacob Whittle (49.90); William Ellington^{[a]} Edward Mildred^{[a]}	3:57.06	France; Maximilien Hugot (57.24); Brendan Fitzpatrick (1:02.93); Lucie Delmas (1:01.61); Lucile Tessariol (55.76); Mary-Ambre Moluh^{[a]} Lucas Peley^{[a]}	3:57.54

^{a} Swimmers who participated in the heats only and received medals.

== Medal table ==
Rank	Nation	Gold	Silver	Bronze	Total
1	Russia (RUS)	14	2	2	18
2	Great Britain (GBR)	6	11	1	18
3	Turkey (TUR)	3	2	6	11
4	Italy (ITA)	2	2	2	6
5	Romania (ROU)	2	2	0	4
6	Croatia (CRO)	2	0	0	2
7	Ukraine (UKR)	1	1	1	3
8	Poland (POL)	1	0	4	5
9	Denmark (DEN)	1	0	1	2
10	Hungary (HUN)	0	6	1	7
11	France (FRA)	0	2	4	6
12	Germany (GER)	0	2	3	5
13	Belgium (BEL)	0	1	0	1
13	Serbia (SRB)	0	1	0	1
15	Ireland (IRL)	0	0	2	2
15	Netherlands (NED)	0	0	2	2
17	Czech Republic (CZE)	0	0	1	1
17	Greece (GRE)	0	0	1	1
17	Israel (ISR)	0	0	1	1
17	Spain (ESP)	0	0	1	1
Totals (20 entries)		32	32	33	97
