= İris Rosenberger =

Turkish swimmer (born 1985)

Personal information
- Nationality: Germany Turkey
- Born: October 16, 1985 (age 41) Traunstein, West Germany
- Height: 160 cm (5 ft 3 in)
- Weight: 55 kg (121 lb)

Sport
- Sport: Swimming
- Strokes: Butterfly
- Club: Fenerbahçe Swimming; SV Wacker Burghausen; Erster Münchner SC; SG Essen

İris Rosenberger (born October 16, 1985, in Traunstein, West Germany) is a Turkish female swimmer competing in the butterfly events. The 160 cm (5 ft 3 in) tall sportswoman at 55 kg (121 lb) is a member of Fenerbahçe Swimming in Istanbul. In Germany, she swims for the teams, SV Wacker Burghausen, Erster Münchner SC and SG Essen.

Her identical twin sister Yasemin (German: Jasmin) is also a swimmer. The twins were born to German father Peter Rosenberger and Turkish mother Leyla Aktaş-Rosenberger, a painter, ceramic artist and sculptor, in Traunstein, Germany. They have a younger sister Deniz, who is also a swimmer. Iris studied business administration at LMU Munich.

Representing Turkey, Iris took part in the 100 m butterfly event at the 2008 Summer Olympics, where she swam 1:01.67 without advancing to the finals.

In 2009, Iris set new Turkish national records in 50 m butterfly with 27.00 and in 100 m butterfly with 59:45. She holds more than 19 national records for Turkey.

== Achievements ==
Year	Competition	Venue	Position	Event	Notes
Representing Turkey
2007	World Aquatics Championships	Melbourne, Australia	42	50 m butterfly	28.65
2007	World Aquatics Championships	Melbourne, Australia	45	100 m butterfly	1:02.26
2008	Summer Olympics	Beijing, China	44	100 m butterfly	1:01.67
2009	World Aquatics Championships	Melbourne, Australia	43	50 m butterfly	27.44
2009	World Aquatics Championships	Melbourne, Australia	46	100 m butterfly	1:00.86
2011	World Aquatics Championships	Shanghai, China	31	50 m butterfly	27.82
2011	World Aquatics Championships	Shanghai, China	38	100 m butterfly	1:00.99
Representing Germany
2012	39. STRÖCK Austrian Qualifying (SC)	Wiener Neustadt, Austria		50 m butterfly	27.09
2012	39. STRÖCK Austrian Qualifying (SC)	Wiener Neustadt, Austria		100 m butterfly	59.81
2012	39. STRÖCK Austrian Qualifying (SC)	Wiener Neustadt, Austria		200 m butterfly	2:13.90
2012	16th international Swimm Festival (SC)	Bayreuth, Germany		50 m butterfly	27.91
2012	16th international Swimm Festival (SC)	Bayreuth, Germany		100 m butterfly	1:01.31
2012	Swim & Fun Days (LC)	Essen, Germany		50 m butterfly	28.22
2012	German Cup 2011 / 2nd Leg (LC)	Saarbrücken, Germany		50 m butterfly	28.75
2012	German Cup 2011 / 2nd Leg (LC)	Saarbrücken, Germany		100 m butterfly	1:04.02
2012	SV NRW Open (LC)	Wuppertal, Germany		100 m butterfly	1:02.76

== See also ==
- Turkish women in sports
