= Zehra Bilgin =

Turkish swimmer (born 2002)

Zehra Duru Bilgin
Personal information
- Full name: Zehra Duru Bilgin
- Born: 27 April 2002 (age 24) Turkey
- Education: Brown University
- Height: 5 ft 9 in (175 cm)

Sport
- Country: Turkey
- Sport: Swimming
- Strokes: Freestyle
- Club: Fenerbahçe Swimming
Medal record
Women's swimming
Representing Turkey
European Championships
Bronze medal – third place	2024 Belgrade	4×200 m freestyle relay

Zehra Duru Bilgin (born 27 April 2002) is a Turkish swimmer who specializes in freestyle swimming of 100 m and 200 m events.She holds a number of national record in various styles and events. She takes part at the 2024 Summer Olympics in Paris, France.

== Sport career ==
Bilgin is a member of Fenerbahçe Swimming in Istanbul. During her college time at Brown University, she competes for the Brown Bears swimming and diving team.

Bilgin competed in the 4 × 100 m freestyle relay event at the 2019 World Aquatics Championships in Gwangju, South Korea.

She won the bronze medal together with Ela Naz Özdemir, Gizem Güvenç and Ecem Dönmez in the 4 × 200 m freestyle relay event at the 2024 European Aquatics Championships in Belgrade, Serbia.

She was qualified to represent her country at the 2024 Summer Olympics in Paris, France together with her teammates Ela Naz Özdemir, Gizem Güvenç and Ecem Dönmez within the first 16 teams with 8:05.21 in the Women's 4 × 200 m freestyle relay event of the 2024 World Aquatics Championships in Doha, Qatar.

== National records ==
Date	Age Category	Course	Event	Time	Venue	Ref
2015-12-11	U13	LCM	50 m backstroke	30.48	Istanbul	
2015-12-11	U13	LCM	100 m butterfly	1:01.99	Istanbul	
2015-12-19	U13	SCM	100 m freestyle	56.42	Istanbul	
2015-12-19	U13	SCM	100 m butterfly	1:00.72	Istanbul	
2016-12-22	U14	SCM	100 m freestyle	56.42	Istanbul	
2016-12-23	U14	SCM	100 m butterfly	59.88	Istanbul	
2017-07-08	U15	SCM	100 m butterfly	59.60	Istanbul	
2018-12-27	U16	SCM	100 m butterfly	59.45	Istanbul	name="tyf2"/>
2019-12-20		LCM	4x100 m freestyle relay	3:38.57	Istanbul	
2024-06-17		LCM	4x200 m freestyle relay	8:01.58	Belgrade	

- SCM: Short course (25 meter)
- LCM Long course (50 meter)

== Personal life ==
Zehra Duru Bilgin was born on 27 April 2002.

She completed her secondary education at the French high school Lycée Saint-Joseph, Istanbul in 2021. She studies at Brown University in Providence, Rhode Island, United States.
