= Swimming at the 2024 European Aquatics Championships – Women's 4 × 200 metre freestyle relay =

Women's 4 × 200 metre freestyle relay at the 2024 European Aquatics Championships
- Venue: Sports Centre Milan Gale Muškatirović
- Dates: 17 June
- Competitors: 35 from 8 nations
- Teams: 8
- Winning time: 7:51.83 NR

Medalists
gold medal	Anastasia Gorbenko; Daria Golovaty; Ayla Spitz; Lea Polonsky; Andrea Murez	Israel
silver medal	Lilla Ábrahám; Ajna Késely; Dóra Molnár; Nikolett Pádár; Zsuzsanna Jakabos; Panna Ugrai	Hungary
bronze medal	Gizem Güvenç; Ela Naz Özdemir; Ecem Dönmez; Zehra Duru Bilgin	Turkey

The Women's 4 × 200 metre freestyle relay competition of the 2024 European Aquatics Championships was held on 17 June 2024.

== Records ==
Before the competition, the existing world, European and championship records were as follows.

	Team	Time	Location	Date
World record	Australia	7:37.50	Fukuoka	27 July 2023
European record	Great Britain	7:45.51	Rome	30 July 2009
Championship record	Italy	7:50.53	Berlin	21 August 2014

== Results ==
=== Heats ===
The heats were held at 10:33.

Rank	Heat	Lane	Nation	Swimmers	Time	Notes
1	1	4	Hungary	Lilla Ábrahám (2:00.79); Zsuzsanna Jakabos (2:01.13); Panna Ugrai (1:59.99); Nikolett Pádár (2:01.91)	8:03.82	Q
2	1	1	Israel	Daria Golovaty (2:00.48); Lea Polonsky (2:02.50); Andrea Murez (2:01.67); Ayla Spitz (2:00.20)	8:04.85	Q
3	1	2	Turkey	Gizem Güvenç (2:00.71); Ela Naz Özdemir (2:01.16); Ecem Dönmez (2:01.70); Zehra Duru Bilgin (2:02.30)	8:05.87	Q
4	1	6	Slovenia	Janja Šegel (1:57.87); Hana Sekuti (2:04.95); Tjaša Pintar (2:08.81); Katja Fain (2:11.19)	8:22.82	Q
5	1	7	Austria	Cornelia Pammer (2:04.93); Lena Opatril (2:05.94); Lena Kreundl (2:05.24); Iris Julia Berger (2:09.32)	8:25.43	Q
6	1	3	Slovakia	Olivia Ana Šprláková-Zmorová (2:08.09); Tamara Potocká (2:02.78); Zora Ripková (2:06.51); Laura Benková (2:08.46)	8:25.84	Q
7	1	8	Germany	Leonie Kullmann (2:02.93); Celine Rieder (2:04.53); Nicole Maier (2:06.26); Maya Werner (2:13.89)	8:27.61	Q
8	1	5	Armenia	Diana Musayelyan (2:10.83); Ani Poghosyan (2:13.53); Varsenik Manucharyan (2:14.94); Yeva Karapetyan (2:22.88)	9:02.18	Q
	1	0	Serbia	DNS		

=== Final ===
The final was held at 19:26.

Rank	Lane	Nation	Swimmers	Time	Notes
1st place, gold medalist(s)	5	Israel	Anastasia Gorbenko (1:56.74) NR; Daria Golovaty (1:57.94); Ayla Spitz (1:59.07); Lea Polonsky (1:58.08)	7:51.83	NR
2nd place, silver medalist(s)	4	Hungary	Lilla Ábrahám (1:58.39); Ajna Késely (1:59.26); Dóra Molnár (1:59.40); Nikolett Pádár (1:55.87)	7:52.92	
3rd place, bronze medalist(s)	3	Turkey	Gizem Güvenç (1:59.26); Ela Naz Özdemir (2:00.48); Ecem Dönmez (2:00.99); Zehra Duru Bilgin (2:00.85)	8:01.58	NR
4	1	Germany	Maya Werner (2:01.03); Leonie Kullmann (2:00.05); Nicole Maier (1:58.14); Celine Rieder (2:02.45)	8:01.67	
5	6	Slovenia	Janja Šegel (1:57.74); Katja Fain (2:01.35); Hana Sekuti (2:03.45); Tjaša Pintar (2:04.39)	8:06.93	
6	2	Austria	Iris Julia Berger (2:02.73); Cornelia Pammer (2:02.12); Lena Opatril (2:04.17); Lena Kreundl (2:03.11)	8:12.13	
7	7	Slovakia	Laura Benková (2:06.04); Tamara Potocká (2:01.17); Zora Ripková (2:04.67); Olivia Ana Šprláková-Zmorová (2:08.15)	8:20.03	
8	8	Armenia	Ani Poghosyan (2:09.25); Diana Musayelyan (2:09.85); Varsenik Manucharyan (2:14.34); Yeva Karapetyan (2:20.19)	8:53.63	
