= Swimming at the 2023 European Youth Summer Olympic Festival =

- Date: 24–28 July

Swimming at the 2023 European Youth Summer Olympic Festival was held in Maribor, Slovenia, from 24 to 28 July 2023.

== Medal table ==
* Host nation (Slovenia)

Rank	Nation	Gold	Silver	Bronze	Total
1	Italy	7	4	7	18
2	Romania	5	0	3	8
3	Great Britain	4	8	3	15
4	Germany	4	3	2	9
5	Hungary	3	5	1	9
6	Turkey	3	1	1	5
7	Norway	1	2	1	4
8	Sweden	1	2	0	3
9	Spain	1	1	2	4
10	Serbia	1	0	1	2
11	Portugal	1	0	0	1
11	Switzerland	1	0	0	1
13	Ukraine	0	2	2	4
14	Greece	0	2	0	2
14	Israel	0	2	0	2
16	Poland	0	1	2	3
17	Netherlands	0	0	2	2
18	Czech Republic	0	0	1	1
18	France	0	0	1	1
18	Lithuania	0	0	1	1
18	Slovakia	0	0	1	1
Totals (21 entries)		32	33	31	96

== Medalists ==
=== Boys ===
Event	Gold		Silver		Bronze	
50 m freestyle	Justin Cvetkov; Serbia	22.69; CR	Nikita Sheremet; Ukraine	22.89	Jan Foltýn; Czech Republic	23.09
100 m freestyle	Carlos D'Ambrosio; Italy	49.78; CR	Sander Kiær Sørensen; Norway	50.55	Przemysław Pietroń; Poland	50.70
200 m freestyle	Sander Kiær Sørensen; Norway	1:50.05	Carlos D'Ambrosio; Italy	1:50.35	Ahmet Mete Boylu; Turkey	1:51.80
400 m freestyle	Emir Batur Albayrak; Turkey	3:51.29; CR	Koppány Kakuk; Hungary	3:57.67	Alberto Ferrazza; Italy	3:58.35
1500 m freestyle	Kuzey Tunçelli; Turkey	14:54.16; CR	Michał Gnaczyński; Poland	15:39.19	Andrei Proca; Romania	15:51.65
100 m backstroke	Daniele Del Signore; Italy	55.38	Aukan Nahuel Goldin; Israel	55.39	Mantas Kaušpėdas; Lithuania	55.47
200 m backstroke	Daniele Del Signore; Italy	1:59.84	Aukan Nahuel Goldin; Israel	2:00.97	Anton Denysenko; Ukraine	2:03.09
100 m breaststroke	Joshua Inglis; Great Britain	1:02.78	Evangelos Ntoumas; Greece	1:02.88	Darius Coman; Romania	1:02.92
200 m breaststroke	Rafael Mimoso; Portugal	2:15.98	Filip Nowacki; Great Britain	2:16.05	Darius Coman; Romania	2:17.01
100 m butterfly	Zoltan Bagi; Hungary	54.33	Isak Fernandez; Spain	54.49	Mykola Kotenko; Ukraine	54.63
200 m butterfly	Tuncer Berk Ertürk; Turkey	1:58.62	Mykola Kotenko; Ukraine	2:01.13	Jakub Katana; Poland	2:01.78
200 m individual medley	Robert Andrei Badea; Romania	2:02.78	Botond Kovács; Hungary	2:04.25	Evan Davidson; Great Britain	2:04.83
400 m individual medley	Robert Andrei Badea; Romania	4:18.80; CR	Tuncer Berk Ertürk; Turkey	4:24.94	Botond Kovács; Hungary	4:27.85
4 × 100 m freestyle relay	Italy; Daniele Del Signore; Luca Scampicchio; Alberto Ferrazza; Carlos D'Ambrosio	3:24.94	Norway; Sander Kiær Sørensen; Jakob Austevoll Harlem; Gergely Laszlo Besenyi; Daniel Rumenov Marinov	3:25.78	France; Néo Dutriaux; Hugo Duvauchelle; Mathieu Dufraigne; Roméo-César Fadda-Sauvageot	3:26.59
4 × 100 m medley relay	Italy; Daniele Del Signore; Lorenzo Fuschini; Riccardo Santiago Osio; Carlos D'Ambrosio	3:42.41; CR	Great Britain; Dean Fearn; Joshua Inglis; Charles Simpson; Jacob Mills	3.46.25	Serbia; Luka Jovanović; Strahinja Stancul; Nemanja Maksić; Justin Cvetkov	3:47.07

=== Girls ===
Event	Gold		Silver		Bronze	
50 m freestyle	Theodora Taylor; Great Britain	25.54	Emmy Hällkvist; Sweden	25.63	Rosalie Reef; Netherlands	26.05
100 m freestyle	Linda Roth; Germany	55.89	Emmy Hällkvist; Sweden	56.54	Rosalie Reef; Netherlands	56.61
200 m freestyle	Linda Roth; Germany	2:01.57	Hollie Wilson; Great Britain	2:02.05	Valentina Procaccini; Italy	2:03.15
400 m freestyle	Vivien Jackl; Hungary	4:12.84	Amelie Blocksidge; Great Britain	4:12.95	Lucrezia Domina; Italy	4:16.58
800 m freestyle	Amelie Blocksidge; Great Britain	8:32.65	Vivien Jackl; Hungary	8:34.84	Alba Rubio Villoria; Spain	8:46.16
100 m backstroke	Daria Silisteanu; Romania	1:01.07	Despoina Pyrili; Greece	1:02.15	Benedetta Boscaro; Italy	1:02.30
200 m backstroke	Aissia Prisecariu; Romania	2:11.73	Vivien Jackl; Hungary	2:15.16	Caterina Santambrogio; Italy	2:16.61
100 m breaststroke	Nayara Pineda Lopez; Spain	1:08.88	Theodora Taylor; Great Britain	1:09.77	Karen Klepp; Norway	1:09.94
200 m breaststroke	Kay-Lyn Loehr; Switzerland	2:30.57	Lucrezia Mancini; Italy	2:15.16	Nayara Pineda; Spain	2:16.61
100 m butterfly	Emmy Hällkvist; Sweden	2:11.83	Alina Baievych; Germany	2:15.00	Rebecca Ongaro; Italy	2:15.98
200 m butterfly	Alina Baievych; Germany	2:11.83	Mira Miszlai; Hungary	2:15.00	Coco Croxford; Great Britain	2:15.98
200 m individual medley	Phoebe Cooper; Great Britain	2:14.53	Linda Roth; Germany	2:15.91	Stela Megelova; Slovakia	2:17.78
400 m individual medley	Vivien Jackl; Hungary	4:47.14	Clarissa Savoldi; Italy	4:49.77	Laura Sophie Kohlmann; Germany	4:50.69
4 × 100 m freestyle relay	Romania; Daria-Mariuca Silisteanu; Diana Gabriela Stiger; Aissia Claudia Prisecariu; Ana Maria Sibişeanu	3:49.78	Great Britain; Theodora Taylor; Mabli Collyer; Hollie Wilson; Phoebe Cooper Italy; Lucrezia Domina; Valentina Procaccini; Benedetta Boscaro; Caterina Santambrogio	3:49.88	None awarded	
4 × 100 m medley relay	Germany; Ewa zur Brügge; Hannah Schneider; Alina Baievych; Linda Roth	4:10.35	Great Britain; Gaby Freeman; Theodora Taylor; Phoebe Cooper; Hollie Wilson	4:10.76	Italy; Benedetta Boscaro; Lucrezia Mancini; Rebecca Ongaro; Caterina Santambrogio	4:11.10

=== Mixed ===
Event	Gold		Silver		Bronze	
4 × 100 m freestyle relay	Italy; Lucrezia Domina; Daniele Del Signore; Carlos D'Ambrosio; Caterina Santambrogio	3:33.88	Great Britain; Evan Davidson; Jacob Mills; Hollie Wilson; Theodora Taylor	3:35.55	Germany; Limaris Dix; Finn Neuwirth; Fiona Kuphal; Yara Riefstahl	3:36.08
4 × 100 m medley relay	Italy; Daniele Del Signore; Lucrezia Mancini; Carlos D'Ambrosio; Caterina Santambrogio	3:55.89	Germany; Finn Neuwirth; Subäjr Biltaev; Alina Baievych; Linda Roth	3:57.53	Great Britain; Dean Fearn; Joshua Inglis; Phoebe Cooper; Hollie Wilson	3:57.69
