= Daria Tatarinova =

Russian swimmer

Personal information
- National team: Russia
- Born: 3 June 2004 (age 22) Saint Petersburg, Russia

Sport
- Sport: Swimming
- Strokes: Freestyle, butterfly
- Club: Saint Petersburg
Medal record
Women's swimming
Representing Russia
Event	1st	2nd	3rd
European Junior Championships	4	1	0
Total	4	1	0
European Junior Championships
Gold medal – first place	2021 Rome	50 m freestyle
Gold medal – first place	2021 Rome	4×100 m freestyle
Gold medal – first place	2021 Rome	4×100 m mixed freestyle
Gold medal – first place	2021 Rome	4×100 m mixed medley
Silver medal – second place	2021 Rome	100 m freestyle

Daria Tatarinova (born 3 June 2004) is a Russian competitive swimmer. At the 2021 European Junior Swimming Championships, she won the gold medal in the 50 metre freestyle in European junior record time as well as gold medals in the 4×100 metre freestyle relay, 4×100 metre mixed freestyle relay, 4×100 metre mixed medley relay, and the silver medal in the 100 metre freestyle.

== Early life ==
Tatarinova was born on 3 June 2004 in Saint Petersburg, Russia. She competes for Saint Petersburg swim club in national competitions.

== Career ==
=== 2021 European Junior Championships ===
2021 European Junior Championships
Gold medal – first place	4×100 m mixed freestyle	3:29.71
Gold medal – first place	4×100 m mixed medley	3:50.25
Gold medal – first place	4×100 m freestyle	3:40.10 (CR)
Gold medal – first place	50 m freestyle	24.87 (EJ, CR)
Silver medal – second place	100 m freestyle	55.12

At the 2021 European Junior Swimming Championships held at the Stadio Olimpico del Nuoto in Rome, Italy when she was 17 years old, Tatarinova won her first medal in the 100 metre freestyle, swimming a personal best time of 55.12 seconds, which earned her the silver medal in the event. In the same evening she won the silver medal, the evening of 7 July, Tatarinova split a 54.56 on the third leg of the 4×100 metre mixed freestyle relay in the final to help earn the gold medal in the event and contribute to Russia taking over first place in the total medal table across the first two days of competition. The third day of competition, 8 July, Tatarinova won a gold medal as part of the 4×100 metre mixed medley relay, swimming the freestyle leg of the relay with a time of 54.66 seconds in the final to help the relay finish in 3:50.25. Day five, she led-off the 4×100 metre freestyle relay with a time of 55.29 seconds to contribute to the time of 3:40.10 in the final, which set a new Championships record in the event and earned the relay members the gold medal.

On the sixth and final day of competition, Tatarinova set a new European junior record and Championships record in the 50 metre freestyle with a personal best and gold medal-winning time of 24.87 seconds, which was 0.48 seconds faster than silver medalist Jana Pavalić of Croatia. Speaking to LEN about her win, Tatarinova said, "It was very hard but rewarding as well. Russia has an important role in swimming, our athletes often succeed in making international podiums. We work hard, both swimmers and coaches." Her performance led the Italian Swimming Federation to dub Tatarinova the "queen of fast" for the event.

=== 2022: Double ban for being Russian ===
Because Tatarinova was born in Russia and continued to compete for her country, she was banned by FINA, the world governing body for aquatic sports, from all of their competition between 21 April 2022 and the end of the calendar year along with all other Russians and Belarusians. FINA also did not count times swum by Russians at other competitions in the remainder of the year for world rankings nor world records. Additionally, she was banned for being herself along with all other Russians and Belarusians by LEN, the European governing body for aquatic sports, from all of their events indefinitely, with zero intent to ever allow them to compete again communicated at the time of ban implementation in March 2022. A similar action, indefinitely implementing a participation ban on Russians and Belarusians at their events, was made in a back-acting manner by World Aquatics in April 2023 that extended its bans from 2022.

=== 2023 ===
For the long course 2023 Russian National Championships in April, Tatarinova placed eighteenth in the 100 metre freestyle on day one with a time of 56.66 seconds. Two days later, in the morning preliminaries of the 50 metre butterfly, she ranked fourth with a time of 26.87 seconds and qualified for the semifinals. For the evening semifinals, she improved by 0.05 seconds to a 26.82, ranked seventh, and qualified for the final. Finishing in a time of 26.55 seconds in the final, she placed sixth, 0.47 seconds behind bronze medalist Daria Klepikova. The fifth day, in the 50 metre freestyle, she first ranked seventh in the preliminaries with a 25.60, then improved her time and rank to fourth in the semifinals with a 25.28 and qualified for the final. On the sixth and final evening, she tied for fourth-place in the final of the 50 metre freestyle with a time of 25.28 seconds, which was 0.03 seconds behind bronze medalist Elizaveta Klevanovich.

== International championships ==
Meet	50 freestyle	100 freestyle	4×100 freestyle	4×100 mixed freestyle	4×100 mixed medley
EJC 2021	1st place, gold medalist(s)	2nd place, silver medalist(s)	1st place, gold medalist(s)	1st place, gold medalist(s)	1st place, gold medalist(s)

== Personal best times ==
=== Long course metres (50 m pool) ===
Event	Time	Meet	Location	Date	Age	Notes	Ref
50 m freestyle	24.87	2021 European Junior Championships	Rome, Italy	11 July 2021	17	EJ	
100 m freestyle	55.12	2021 European Junior Championships	Rome, Italy	7 July 2021	17		
50 m butterfly	26.18	2021 Russian National Championships	Kazan	5 April 2021	16		

Legend: EJ – European Junior record

== European junior records ==
=== Long course metres (50 m pool) ===
No.	Event	Time	Meet	Location	Date	Age	Ref
1	50 m freestyle	24.87	2021 European Junior Championships	Rome, Italy	11 July 2021	17	
