= Swimming at the 2025 European Youth Summer Olympic Festival =

- Venue: Olympic Pool, Skopje
- Date: 21–25 July 2025

Swimming at the 2025 European Youth Summer Olympic Festival will be held in Skopje, North Macedonia, from 21 to 25 July 2025.

== Medal table ==
Rank	Nation	Gold	Silver	Bronze	Total
1	Italy	8	6	3	17
2	Hungary	6	1	5	12
3	Spain	4	3	3	10
4	Great Britain	3	6	2	11
–	BOC	3	2	0	5
5	Turkey	3	1	2	6
6	Ukraine	2	2	1	5
7	Poland	1	3	2	6
8	Romania	1	1	1	3
9	France	1	1	0	2
10	Switzerland	0	2	1	3
11	Slovakia	0	2	0	2
12	Israel	0	1	1	2
13	Bosnia and Herzegovina	0	1	0	1
14	Germany	0	0	3	3
15	Austria	0	0	2	2
15	Czech Republic	0	0	2	2
15	Portugal	0	0	2	2
18	Croatia	0	0	1	1
18	Greece	0	0	1	1
Totals (19 entries)		32	32	32	96

== Medalists ==
=== Boys ===
Event	Gold	Silver	Bronze
50 m freestyle	Mikita Liakh; NOC Belarus	Adam Olah; Hungary	Rodolfo Alecrim; Portugal
100 m freestyle	Daniele Fiorelli; Italy	Mikita Liakh; BOC	Rodolfo Alecrim; Portugal
200 m freestyle	Luca Marinescu; Romania	Luca Soriani; Italy	Makar Yakhno; Ukraine
400 m freestyle	Zétény Sárkány; Hungary	Filip Gero; Slovakia	Shon Osher Fomberg Kozka; Israel
1500 m freestyle	Makar Yakhno; Ukraine	Shon Osher Fomberg Kozka; Israel	Zeteny Sarkany; Hungary
100 m backstroke	Francesco Cecconi; Italy	Patryk Pryzczyna; Great Britain	Isak Dokic; Croatia
200 m backstroke	Austyn Manley; Great Britain	Giorgio Sartori; Italy	Anass Lahrach; Germany
100 m breaststroke	Maksim Malyshka; BOC	Kostiantyn Fediuchuk; Ukraine	Simon Studnicka; Czech Republic
200 m breaststroke	Maksim Malyshka; BOC	Kostiantyn Fediuchuk; Ukraine	Simon Studnicka; Czech Republic
100 m butterfly	Arel Gültekin; Turkey	Alberto Madrid Prado; Spain	Boris Bandiera; Italy
200 m butterfly	Arel Gültekin; Turkey	Alberto Madrid Prado; Spain	Marios Vlachakis; Greece
200 m individual medley	Austyn Manley; Great Britain	Cezar Stoica; Romania	Sergio Villen Moreno; Spain
400 m individual medley	Makar Yakhno; Ukraine	Filip Gero; Slovakia	Cezar Stoica; Romania
4 × 100 m freestyle relay	Italy; Daniele Fiorelli; Francesco Cecconi; Luca Soriani; Jacapo Apicerni	Great Britain; Patryk Pryzczyna; Nicolai Sisnett; Xander Tovey; Austyn Manley	Germany; Theodor Buscher; Elias Himmelsbach; Jannis Kube; Nils Woddow
4 × 100 m medley relay	Turkey; Arel Gültekin; Eymen Batu İbolar; Serhat Kasal; Sarp Barkın Hasay	Italy; Francesco Cecconi; Boris Bandiera; Vincenzo Maniaci; Daniele Fiorelli	Great Britain; Austyn Manley; Patryk Przyczyna; Nikolai Sisnett; Tyler Stone

=== Girls ===
Event	Gold		Silver	Bronze
50 m freestyle	Irene Ciercoles Galve; Spain		Zsofia Szalai; Hungary	Lili Mundell; Great Britain
100 m freestyle	Alessandra Mao; Italy	54.98; CR	Barbara Lesniewska; Poland	Irene Ciercoles Galve; Spain
200 m freestyle	Alessandra Mao; Italy	2:00.13; CR	Barbara Lesniewska; Poland	Zarina Selimovic; Germany
400 m freestyle	Sofia Biagi; Italy		Rosalie Mesmcaque; France	Anna Bartalos; Hungary
800 m freestyle	Rosalie Mesmcaque; France		Sofia Biagi; Italy	Anna Bartalos; Hungary
100 m backstroke	Irene Ciercoles Galve; Spain		Anastasia Hak; Switzerland	Giorgia Barozzi; Italy
200 m backstroke	Darcey Smith; Great Britain		Anastasia Hak; Switzerland	Hanna Kiraly; Hungary
100 m breaststroke	Izabell Nagy Benedek; Hungary		Josie Lawn; Great Britain	Su Yüksel; Turkey
200 m breaststroke	Petra Puzsa; Hungary		Ela İşcan; Turkey	Lilli Paier; Austria
100 m butterfly	Boroka Kertesz; Hungary		Lydia Cordle; Great Britain	Seher Kaya; Turkey
200 m butterfly	Boroka Kertesz; Hungary		Zerina Vrabac; Bosnia and Herzegovina	Michelle Montagnini; Italy
200 m individual medley	Barbara Lesniewska; Poland		Maria Santana Beneyto; Spain	Lilla Hauer; Switzerland
400 m individual medley	Maria Santana Beneyto; Spain		Lois Child; Great Britain	Nida Omid; Austria
4 × 100 m freestyle relay	Spain; Irene Ciercoles Galve; Blanca Codony; Candela Arroyo Carbajo; Carlota Rodriguez		Italy; Alessandra Mao; Giorgia Barozzi; Sofia Napoli; Hannah Oberhauser	Hungary; Angela Bencsics; Kincso Hanna Szabo; Zsofia Szalai; Boroka Zsofia Kertesz
4 × 100 m medley relay	Hungary; Hanna Greta Kiraly; Izabell Nagy-Benedek; Boroka Zsofia Kertesz; Kincso Hanna Szabo		Italy; Giorgia Barozzi; Giorgia Punturieri; Lucrezia Boncio; Alessandra Mao	Poland; Ewa Leciejewska; Emilia Osadnik; Barbara Lesniewska; Gabriela Bortlisz

=== Mixed ===
Event	Gold	Silver	Bronze
4 × 100 m freestyle relay	Italy; Alessandra Mao; Giorgia Barozzi; Daniele Fiorelli; Jacopo Apicerni	Poland; Gabriela Bortlisz; Hubert Hołub; Barbara Leśniewska; Bartosz Nawrat	Great Britain; Patryk Przyczyna; Lois Child; Lydia Cordle; Austyn Manley
4 × 100 m medley relay	Italy; Sofia Biagi; Vincenzo Maniaci; Lucrezia Boncio; Giorgio Sartori	Great Britain; Patryk Przyczyna; Lois Child; Lydia Cordle; Tyler Stone	Spain; Sergio Villén Moreno; Candela Arroyo Carbajo; María Santana Beneyto; Nicolás Astigarrabia Rodríguez
