= Gülşah Günenç =

Turkish swimmer (born 1985)

Personal information
- Full name: Gülşah Günenç
- National team: Turkey
- Born: 5 January 1985 (age 41) Istanbul, Turkey
- Height: 1.68 m (5 ft 6 in)
- Weight: 60 kg (132 lb)

Sport
- Sport: Swimming
- Strokes: Butterfly
- Club: Fenerbahce Swimming
- College team: Ohio State University (U.S.)
- Coach: Jeanne Fleck (U.S.)

Gülşah Günenç (born January 5, 1985) is a Turkish former swimmer, who specialized in butterfly events. She represented Turkey in two editions of the Olympic Games (2004 and 2008). She broke two Turkish national records in both 100 and 200 m butterfly at the 2006 FINA World Championships (SC). Gunenc is also a member of the swimming team for Fenerbahce Sports Club in her native Istanbul, and for the Buckeyes at Ohio State University in Columbus, Ohio.

Gunenc made her first Turkish team (aged 19) at the 2004 Summer Olympics in Athens, competing in a butterfly double. On the first day of the competition, she had been battling with fever to race smoothly for third and thirty-fifth overall behind fastest entrant Cheng Wan-jung of the Chinese Taipei and leader Kateryna Zubkova of Ukraine by more than a second in heat one of the women's 100 m butterfly, finishing with a mark of 1:04.30. Three days later, in the 200 m butterfly, Gunenc tried to hold on with Singapore's two-time Olympian Christel Bouvron throughout the race in heat one to finish sixth and thirty-first on the morning prelims at 2:20.17.

At the 2008 Summer Olympics in Beijing, Gunenc qualified for the second time in the women's 200 m butterfly by eclipsing a FINA B-standard of 2:15.32 from the Toyota Grand Prix four months earlier in Columbus, Ohio. Swimming in heat one, Gunenc set a Turkish record in a tech bodysuit at 2:14.44 to chase Norway's Ingvild Snildal for second place by just a fingertip (0.09 seconds), but failed to advance to the semifinals with a thirty-second overall finish.

Gunenc received a triple-major business degree at the Ohio State University in Columbus, Ohio, despite her early English language problems and transitional adjustments to American culture. Shortly after the Olympics, she eventually retired from swimming to pursue her master's degree in economics, while attending graduate school at UC Santa Barbara in California.

== See also ==
- Turkish women in sports
