= Jana Pavalić =

Croatian swimmer (born 2007)

Personal information
- National team: Croatia
- Born: 27 May 2007 (age 19) Croatia

Sport
- Sport: Swimming
- Strokes: Butterfly, freestyle
- Coach: Ivica Androić
Medal record
Women's swimming
Representing Croatia
| Event | 1st | 2nd | 3rd |
|---|---|---|---|
| World Junior Championships | 1 | 0 | 0 |
| European Junior Championships | 0 | 1 | 1 |
| European Youth Olympic Festival | 1 | 1 | 0 |
| Total | 2 | 2 | 1 |
World Junior Championships
| Gold medal – first place | 2022 Lima | 50 m butterfly |
European Junior Championships
| Silver medal – second place | 2021 Rome | 50 m freestyle |
| Bronze medal – third place | 2022 Otopeni | 50 m butterfly |
European Youth Olympic Festival
| Gold medal – first place | 2022 Banská Bystrica | 50 m freestyle |
| Silver medal – second place | 2022 Banská Bystrica | 100 m freestyle |

Jana Pavalić (born 27 May 2007) is a Croatian competitive swimmer. She is the Croatian record holder in the long course 50-metre freestyle, 100-metre freestyle, and 50-metre butterfly, as well as the short course 50-metre butterfly. At the 2022 World Junior Championships, she won the gold medal in the 50-metre butterfly with a Croatian record time of 26.38 seconds at 15 years of age. As a 14-year-old, she placed 24th in the 50-metre butterfly, 28th in the 50-metre freestyle, and 37th in the 100-metre freestyle at the 2021 World Short Course Championships.

== Background ==
In 2022, Pavalić announced her goal of competing at the 2024 Summer Olympics. She trains under the guidance of Ivica Androić.

== Career ==
=== 2021 ===
On 5 June, at the 2021 Croatian National Championships in Rijeka, Pavalić won the gold medal in the 50-metre freestyle with a Croatian record time of 25.66 seconds, which was 2.23 seconds faster than the silver medalist. Later in the month on 27 June, which marked one month after she turned 14 years old, she set a second national record, this time in the 50-metre butterfly with a time of 26.50 seconds to win the silver medal at the Zlatni Medvjed in Zagreb.

==== 2021 European Junior Championships ====
2021 European Junior Championships
| Silver medal – second place | 50 m freestyle | 25.35 |

At the 2021 European Junior Swimming Championships, held in July in Rome, Italy, Pavalić won the silver medal in the 50-metre freestyle with a time of 25.35 seconds, which was less than five-tenths of a second behind gold medalist Daria Tatarinova of Russia. En course to her silver medal, she set a new Croatian record in the event in the semifinals with a personal best time of 25.28 seconds after first lowering her Croatian record to a 25.64 in the preliminaries. In her other events, she placed twelfth in the 4×100-metre mixed medley relay, thirteenth in the 100-metre freestyle with a Croatian record time of 56.16 seconds (which she tied in the semifinals after establishing in the preliminary heats), eighteenth in the preliminaries of the 100-metre butterfly in 1:01.50 before withdrawing from the semifinals, and she did not start the 50-metre butterfly.

While Pavalić's Croatian record time of 25.28 seconds in the 50-metre freestyle was 0.23 seconds faster than the Olympic selection time, it was not achieved in the qualifying time period for the 2020 Summer Olympics, which ended on 27 June. Her earlier Croatian record time of 25.66 seconds was achieved in the qualifying time period, on 5 June, however, it was 0.15 seconds slower than the selection time and thus she was not invited to compete at the 2020 Olympic Games by the International Olympic Committee, instead the Team Croatia spot went to female swimmer Ema Rajić who achieved an Olympic selection time in a different event.

==== 2021 Swimming World Cup ====
In October, at the 2021 FINA Swimming World Cup stop held at Danube Arena in Budapest, Hungary, and conducted in short course metres, Pavalić placed ninth in the 50-metre butterfly with a Croatian record and personal best time of 26.34 seconds, breaking the former record set by Monika Babok in 2009. In her other events, she placed fourth in the 4×50-metre mixed medley relay with a 1:45.84, twelfth in the 50-metre freestyle with a time of 25.18 seconds, twenty-second in the 100-metre freestyle with a 56.26, and was disqualified in the 4×50-metre mixed freestyle relay. The month following the World Cup, she competed at the Miting Mladost in Zagreb, setting a new Croatian record of 59.16 seconds in the short course 100-metre butterfly.

==== 2021 World Short Course Championships ====
As a 14-year-old in December, Pavalić competed at the 2022 World Short Course Championships, contested at Etihad Arena in Abu Dhabi, United Arab Emirates, placing 37th on day two of competition in her first event, the 100-metre freestyle, with a time of 55.45 seconds. The following day, she placed 24th in the 50-metre butterfly with a time of 26.47 seconds. Two days later, she achieved a 28th-place finish in the 50-metre freestyle with a personal best time of 25.09 seconds.

=== 2022 ===
==== 2022 European Junior Championships ====
2022 European Junior Championships
| Bronze medal – third place | 50 m butterfly | 26.76 |

In the preliminary heats of the 4×100-metre freestyle relay on day one of the 2022 European Junior Swimming Championships, held in July in Otopeni, Romania, Pavalić set a new Croatian record in the 100-metre freestyle with a time of 56.09 seconds, helping qualify the relay to the final ranking eighth with a Croatian record time of 3:49.81. She led-off the relay with a 56.10 in the final to help place eighth with a Croatian record time of 3:49.56 and the following day placed eighth in the 4×100-metre mixed freestyle relay, anchoring the relay to a finish in a Croatian record time of 3:34.28 with a split time of 56.92 seconds. On the third day of competition, she placed fifth in the 50-metre freestyle with a time of 25.45 seconds, finishing 0.23 seconds behind gold medalist Nina Jazy of Germany. The fourth day, she helped place fifteenth in the 4×100-metre mixed medley relay in 4:06.58, splitting a 1:04.63 for the butterfly leg of the relay. The sixth and final day, she won a bronze medal in the 50-metre butterfly with a time of 26.76 seconds, which was 0.13 seconds slower than silver medalist Roos Vanotterdijk of Belgium.

==== 2022 European Youth Olympic Festival ====
On 26 July, Pavalić won the silver medal in the 100-metre freestyle as part of swimming competition at the 2022 European Youth Summer Olympic Festival in Banská Bystrica, Slovakia, finishing second in 56.33 seconds. Three days later, she won the gold medal in the 50-metre freestyle, finishing first over three-tenths of a seconds ahead of the silver medalist with a time of 25.61 seconds.

==== 2022 World Junior Championships ====
2022 World Junior Championships
| Gold medal – first place | 50 m butterfly | 26.38 (NR) |

For her first event of the 2022 FINA World Junior Swimming Championships, held in August and September in Lima, Peru, Pavalić won the gold medal in the 50-metre butterfly at 15 years, 98 days of age with a Croatian record time of 26.38 seconds, which was 0.29 seconds faster than silver medalist Beatriz Bezerra of Brazil. In her second and final event, the 50-metre freestyle, she placed fourth with a time of 25.62 seconds, finishing 0.02 seconds behind bronze medalist Matilde Biagiotti of Italy. This marked an improvement from the semifinals the day before, where she ranked fifth with a time of 25.96 seconds to qualify for the final.

== International championships (50 m) ==
| Meet | 50 freestyle | 100 freestyle | 50 butterfly | 100 butterfly | 4×100 freestyle | 4×100 mixed freestyle | 4×100 mixed medley |
|---|---|---|---|---|---|---|---|
| EJC 2021 | 2nd place, silver medalist(s) | 12th | DNS | 18th (h,WD) | | | 12th |
| EJC 2022 | 5th | | 3rd place, bronze medalist(s) | | 6th | 8th | 15th |
| WJC 2022 | 4th | | 1st place, gold medalist(s) | | | | |

== International championships (25 m) ==
| Meet | 50 freestyle | 100 freestyle | 50 butterfly |
|---|---|---|---|
| WC 2021 | 28th | 37th | 24th |

== Personal best times ==
=== Long course metres (50 m pool) ===
| Event | Time | | Meet | Location | Date | Age | Notes | Ref |
|---|---|---|---|---|---|---|---|---|
| 50 m freestyle | 25.28 | sf | 2021 European Junior Championships | Rome, Italy | 10 July 2021 | 14 | NR | |
| 100 m freestyle | 56.09 | h, r | 2022 European Junior Championships | Otopeni, Romania | 5 July 2022 | 15 | NR | |
| 50 m butterfly | 26.38 | | 2022 World Junior Championships | Lima, Peru | 2 September 2022 | 15 | NR | |
| 100 m butterfly | 1:01.01 | | Miting Zlatni Medvjed | Croatia | 26 June 2021 | 14 | | |

Legend: NR – Croatian record;
Records not set in finals: h – heat; sf – semifinal; r – relay 1st leg; rh – relay heat 1st leg; b – B final; † – en route to final mark; so – swim-off; tt – time trial

=== Short course metres (25 m pool) ===
| Event | Time | | Meet | Location | Date | Age | Notes | Ref |
|---|---|---|---|---|---|---|---|---|
| 50 m freestyle | 25.09 | h | 2021 World Short Course Championships | Abu Dhabi, United Arab Emirates | 20 December 2021 | 14 | | |
| 100 m freestyle | 55.06 | | Miting Mladost | Zagreb | 14 November 2021 | 14 | | |
| 50 m butterfly | 26.34 | h | 2021 Swimming World Cup | Budapest, Hungary | 8 October 2021 | 14 | NR | |
| 100 m butterfly | 59.16 | h | Miting Mladost | Zagreb | 13 November 2021 | 14 | Former NR | |

Legend: NR – Croatian record;
Records not set in finals: h – heat; sf – semifinal; r – relay 1st leg; rh – relay heat 1st leg; b – B final; † – en route to final mark; so – swim-off; tt – time trial

== National records ==
=== Long course metres (50 m pool) ===
| No. | Event | Time | | Meet | Location | Date | Age | Status | Ref |
|---|---|---|---|---|---|---|---|---|---|
| 1 | 50 m freestyle | 25.66 | | 2021 Croatian National Championships | Rijeka | 5 June 2021 | 14 years, 9 days | Former | |
| 2 | 50 m butterfly | 26.50 | | 35th Zlatni Medvjed | Zagreb | 27 June 2021 | 14 years, 31 days | Former | |
| 3 | 100 m freestyle | 56.16 | h | 2021 European Junior Championships | Rome, Italy | 7 July 2021 | 14 years, 41 days | Former | |
| 4 | 100 m freestyle (2) | 56.16 | sf, = | 2021 European Junior Championships | Rome, Italy | 7 July 2021 | 14 years, 41 days | Former | |
| 5 | 50 m freestyle (2) | 25.64 | h | 2021 European Junior Championships | Rome, Italy | 10 July 2021 | 14 years, 44 days | Former | |
| 6 | 50 m freestyle (3) | 25.28 | sf | 2021 European Junior Championships | Rome, Italy | 10 July 2021 | 14 years, 44 days | Current | |
| 7 | 100 m freestyle (3) | 56.09 | h, r | 2022 European Junior Championships | Otopeni, Romania | 5 July 2022 | 15 years, 39 days | Current | |
| 8 | 4×100 m freestyle | 3:49.81 | h | 2022 European Junior Championships | Otopeni, Romania | 5 July 2022 | 15 years, 39 days | Former | |
| 9 | 4×100 m freestyle (2) | 3:49.56 | | 2022 European Junior Championships | Otopeni, Romania | 5 July 2022 | 15 years, 39 days | Current | |
| 10 | 4×100 m mixed freestyle | 3:34.28 | | 2022 European Junior Championships | Otopeni, Romania | 6 July 2022 | 15 years, 40 days | Current | |
| 11 | 50 m butterfly (2) | 26.38 | | 2022 World Junior Championships | Lima, Peru | 2 September 2022 | 15 years, 98 days | Current | |

Legend: h – preliminary heat; sf – semifinal; r – relay 1st leg; = – tied pre-existing record

=== Short course metres (25 m pool) ===
| No. | Event | Time | | Meet | Location | Date | Age | Status | Ref |
|---|---|---|---|---|---|---|---|---|---|
| 1 | 50 m butterfly | 26.34 | h | 2021 Swimming World Cup | Budapest, Hungary | 8 October 2021 | 14 years, 134 days | Current | |
| 2 | 100 m butterfly | 59.16 | h | Miting Mladost | Zagreb | 13 November 2021 | 14 years, 170 days | Former | |

Legend: h – preliminary heat

== Awards and honours ==
- Zagorje.com, Krapina-Zagorje County Women's Best in Sport (Swimming): 2022
