= Mykola Kotenko =

Ukrainian swimmer (born 2007)

Personal information
- Full name: Mykola Kotenko
- Nationality: Ukrainian
- Born: January 20, 2007 (age 19) Kamianske, Ukraine

Sport
- Sport: Swimming
Medal record
Men's swimming
Representing Ukraine
European Youth Olympic Festival
Gold medal – first place	2022 Banská Bystrica	200 m butterfly
Silver medal – second place	2023 Maribor	200 m butterfly
Bronze medal – third place	2023 Maribor	100 m butterfly

Mykola Kotenko (born 20 January 2007) is a Ukrainian competitive swimmer who represented Ukraine in the European Youth Olympic Festival. He is a gold medalist of 2022 European Youth Summer Olympic Festival in 200 m butterfly event He was born in Kamianske. He is a silver medalist in 200 m butterfly and a bronze one in 100 m butterfly event at the 2023 European Youth Summer Olympic Festival. He was also a flagbearer of his country during the opening ceremony of the 2023 European Youth Summer Olympic Festival.
