= Serkan Atasay =

Ukrainian-born Turkish swimmer

Personal information
- Full name: Serhiy Anatoliyevich Serhieiev
- National team: Ukraine; Turkey
- Born: 11 March 1970 (age 56) Zaporizhia, Ukrainian SSR, Soviet Union
- Height: 1.76 m (5 ft 9 in)
- Weight: 72 kg (159 lb)

Sport
- Sport: Swimming
- Strokes: Butterfly, medley
- Club: Fenerbahçe Spor Kulübü (TUR)
- Coach: Oleksandr Yaremenko (UKR)

Serhiy Anatoliyevich Serhieiev (also Serkan Atasay, Ukrainian: Сергій Анатолійович Сергеєв; born March 11, 1970) is a Ukrainian-born Turkish swimmer, who specialized in butterfly and individual medley events. He is a three-time Olympian (1996, 2004, and 2008), a multiple-time Ukrainian champion, and a five-time Turkish record holder. He is also a member of Fenerbahçe Swimming.

Atasay's Olympic debut came as a member of the Ukrainian team at the 1996 Summer Olympics in Atlanta. At that event he placed 23rd in the 200m individual medley with a time of 2:06.30.

Eight years later, Atasay qualified again for the 200m individual medley by clearing a FINA B-cut of 2:03.01 at the Ukrainian Open Championships in Kyiv. Swimming in heat four, he edged out Barbados' Bradley Ally to take a third spot and 22nd overall by 0.03 of a second in 2:03.26.

At the 2008 Summer Olympics in Beijing, Atasay, under a different name, represented Turkey as Serkan Atasay. He qualified for the third straight time in the 200m individual medley by achieving a FINA B-standard entry time of 2:04.56 from the Acropolis Grand Prix in Athens, Greece. He competed against six other swimmers in the second heat, including two-time Olympian Miguel Molina of the Philippines. Atasay came sixth. Atasay failed to advance into the semi-finals, as he placed 42nd overall in the preliminary heats.
