= Merve Terzioğlu =

Turkish swimmer (1987–2008)

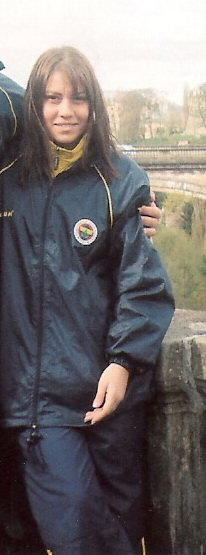
- Merve Terzioğlu with Fenerbahçe

Personal information
- Nationality: Turkish
- Born: 24 February 1987 Istanbul, Turkey
- Died: 7 April 2008 (aged 21) Memphis, Tennessee, U.S.

Sport
- Sport: Swimming
- Strokes: Breaststroke

Merve Terzioğlu (24 February 1987 – 7 April 2008) was a Turkish swimmer in the sports club Galatasaray the latest and before that (2002–2006) in Fenerbahçe, both teams in leading positions nationally in Turkey. She was the holder of two national records and was Balkan champions and had obtained a third place in the COMEN Cup Swimming Competition of Mediterranean countries. She competed in the 200 m breaststroke.

Part of the swimming team of Delta State University in her first season as freshman, Terzioğlu was described as a standout performer and had garnered the Most Valuable Swimmer Award at the New South Intercollegiate Swim Conference Championships in February 2008.

She and her teammate Molly Bates died from injuries received in a one-auto car accident in Cleveland, Mississippi, that occurred on 29 March 2008, Molly Bates losing her life on the spot and Merve Terzioğlu eight days later on 7 April.

== See also ==
- Turkish women in sports
