= Ecem Dönmez =

Turkish swimmer (born 1998)

Personal information
- National team: Turkey
- Born: 29 October 1998 (age 27) Turkey
- Education: Political science and International relations at Yeditepe University
- Spouse: Berkay Ömer Öğretir (m. 2024)

Sport
- Sport: Swimming
- Strokes: Freestyle
- Club: Fenerbahçe Swimming
Medal record
Women's swimming
Representing Turkey
European Championships
Bronze medal – third place	2024 Belgrade	4×200 m freestyle relay
Islamic Solidarity Games
Gold medal – first place	2025 Riyadh	200 m freestyle
Gold medal – first place	2025 Riyadh	400 m individual medley
Gold medal – first place	2025 Riyadh	4×200 m freestyle
Silver medal – second place	2025 Riyadh	400 m freestyle

Ecem Dönmez (born 29 October 1998) is a Turkish swimmer who specializes in freestyle swimming of 100 m and 200 m events. She takes part at the 2024 Summer Olympics in Paris, France.

== Sport career ==
Dönmez's passion for swimming started at the age of eight. Already at age 13, she set a new national record.

Dönmez is a member of Fenerbahçe Swimming in Istanbul.

Dönmez competed in the 4 × 100 m freestyle relay event at the 2019 World Aquatics Championships in Gwangju, South Korea.

She won the bronze medal together with Ela Naz Özdemir, Gizem Güvenç and Zehra Duru Bilgin in the 4 × 200 m freestyle relay event at the 2024 European Aquatics Championships in Belgrade, Serbia.

She was qualified to represent her country at the 2024 Summer Olympics in Paris, France together with her teammates Ela Naz Özdemir, Gizem Güvenç and Zehra Bilgin within the first 16 teams with 8:05.21 in the Women's 4 × 200 m freestyle relay event of the 2024 World Aquatics Championships in Doha, Qatar.

== Personal life ==
Ecem Dönmez was born on 29 October 1998. She studied Political science and International relations at Yeditepe University in Istanbul.

Ece Dönmez and Berkay Ömer Öğretir (born 1998), another Turkish swimmer competing at the 2024 Summer Olympics, married in Paris on 2 August after completing their competitions at the Olympic Games.
