= Swimming at the 1993 European Youth Summer Olympic Days =

- Host city: Valkenswaard, Netherlands
- Date: 1993
- Nations: 50
- Events: 26

Swimming at the 1993 European Youth Summer Olympic Days was held in Valkenswaard, Netherlands.

== Medal summary ==
=== Events ===
==== Boys' events ====
Games	Gold		Silver		Bronze	
Freestyle
100 m freestyle	Pieter van den Hoogenband; Netherlands	52.91	Eugeny Khimitch; Russia	54.77	Jure Melon; Slovenia	55.12
200 m freestyle	Massimiliano Rosolino; Italy	1:56.58	Pieter van den Hoogenband; Netherlands	1:57.17	Petro Kovaliov; Ukraine	1:57.90
Backstroke
100 m backstroke	Hugh O'Connor; Ireland	1:01.32	Tim Riley; Great Britain	1:01.95	Piotr Florczyk; Poland	1:02.00
200 m backstroke	Piotr Florczyk; Poland	2:11.02	Denis Elizarov; Russia	2:12.07	Hugh O'Connor; Ireland	2:14.02
Breastroke
100 m breaststroke	Dmitry Petroushin; Russia	1:06.06	Ian Edmond; Great Britain	1:06.95	Massimo Parati; Italy	1:07.88
200 m breaststroke	Maxim Souvorov; Russia	2:26.27	Pavio Kononov; Ukraine	2:26.57	Gergely Ivanovics; Hungary	2:27.35
Butterfly
100 m butterfly	Miklos Kollar; Hungary	58.85	Aitor Burgoa; Spain	59.12	Ivan Sorokin; Russia	59.32
200 m butterfly	Aitor Burgoa; Spain	2:07.83	Borut Poje; Slovenia	2:10.44	Denis Kaprolov; Russia	2:12.39
Medley
200 m individual medley	Sebastien Joncourt; France	2:13.03	Paul Kennerley; Great Britain	2:15.43	Sergio Azner; Spain	2:16.53
Relays
4 × 100 m freestyle relay	Netherlands	3:41.03	Italy	3:42.41	Great Britain	3:42.48
4 × 100 m medley relay	Italy	4:01.64	Russia	4:02.11	Spain	4:05.21

==== Girls' events ====
Games	Gold		Silver		Bronze	
Freestyle
100 m freestyle	Yelena Nazemnova; Russia	1:00.53	Name not recorded Sweden	1:00.71	Emma Parker; Great Britain	1:00.78
200 m freestyle	Thea Evanson; Great Britain	2:11.35	Trine Roesdahl; Denmark	2:11.61	Olga Kropotina; Russia	2:12.36
Backstroke
100 m backstroke	Name not recorded Spain	1:07.97	Samantha Chaperon; Great Britain	1:08.74	Anna Simoni; Italy	1:09.07
200 m backstroke	Ilaria Colaiacomo; Italy	2:21.62	Vanessa Rojo; Spain	2:25.24	Annamaria Gazda; Hungary	2:26.27
Breastroke
100 m breaststroke	Olga Landik; Russia	1:13.94	Linda Hindmarsh; Great Britain	1:15.73	Federica Biscia; Italy	1:15.77
200 m breaststroke	Linda Hindmarsh; Great Britain	2:42.03	Natascia Manzotti; Italy	2:42.57	Miroslava Simonova; Czech Republic	2:43.03
Butterfly
100 m butterfly	Tinka Dancevic; Croatia	1:06.38	Name not recorded Portugal	1:07.08	Petra Jindrichova; Czech Republic	1:07.30
200 m butterfly	Tinka Dancevic; Croatia	2:21.20	Yelena Nazemnova; Russia	2:25.21	Name not recorded Great Britain	2:26.29
Medley
200 m individual medley	Francesca Bissoli; Italy	2:27.98	Laura Roca; Spain	2:29.63	Lina Brantemark; Sweden	2:29.74
Relays
4 × 100 m freestyle relay	Great Britain	4:08.97	Denmark	4:10.94	Sweden	4:11.97
4 × 100 m medley relay	Russia	4:31.75	Italy	4:33.72	Great Britain	4.34.70
