= Tamryn van Selm =

English swimmer (born 2004)

Personal information
- Nationality: British (English)
- Born: 27 January 2004 (age 22) Orpington, London

Sport
- Sport: Swimming
- Strokes: Freestyle
- University team: NC State University
- Club: Bromley SC
Medal record
Women's swimming
Representing Great Britain
European Championships (LC)
Gold medal – first place	2020 Budapest	4x200 m freestyle
Silver medal – second place	2022 Rome	4x200 m freestyle
European Junior Championships
Silver medal – second place	2019 Kazan	4x200 m freestyle
Silver medal – second place	2021 Rome	200 m freestyle
Silver medal – second place	2021 Rome	4x100 m freestyle
Bronze medal – third place	2021 Rome	4x100 m medley
European Youth Olympic Festival
Gold medal – first place	2019 Baku	4x100 m mixed freestyle
Silver medal – second place	2019 Baku	100 m freestyle
Silver medal – second place	2019 Baku	4x100 m freestyle
Silver medal – second place	2019 Baku	4x100 m medley
Representing England
Commonwealth Games
Bronze medal – third place	2022 Birmingham	4×200 m freestyle

Tamryn van Selm (born 27 January 2004) is an English international swimmer. She has represented England at the Commonwealth Games.

== Biography ==
Van Selm was educated at Newstead Wood School, Millfield School and the North Carolina State University and swims for the Bromley Swimming Club. She joined the British Swimming World Class Programme in 2020. At the 2022 British Swimming Championships she reached the final of the 100m, 200m and 400m freestyle events.

In 2022, she was selected for the 2022 Commonwealth Games in Birmingham where she competed in three events; the women's 200 metres freestyle, finishing in 13th place, the women's 400 metres freestyle and the 4 × 200 metres freestyle relay, where she won a bronze medal.
