= Fenerbahçe S.K. (swimming) =

Fenerbahçe
- Full name: Fenerbahçe Sports Club Swimming Section
- Nickname: Sarı Lacivertliler (The Yellow-Navy Blues)
- Short name: Fenerbahçe Swimming
- Founded: 1913
- Ground: Dereağzı Facilities, Istanbul, Turkey
- Chairman: Aziz Yıldırım
- Head coach: İsa Fatih Yıldırım

Fenerbahçe Swimming is the men's and women's swimming department of Fenerbahçe S.K., a major sports club in Istanbul, Turkey. Homeground and training place are the club's own Dereağzı Facilities.

The swimming branch, which had shown success from time to time from the 1910s to the 1960s, became history in 1964. Fenerbahçe Swimming Branch, which was established permanently in 1997 after short-term activities, ended the dominance of Galatasaray and Istanbul Swimming Specialization Club, and became the club that won the Turkish championship in the Turkish Inter-Club Swimming Championship a total of 24 times, 31 times for men and 39 times for women as of 2023, and became the club that won the most Turkish championships. Fenerbahçe has been the club that has provided the most athletes to the national team in high-level international competitions since 1998, especially in the 2000, 2004 and 2008 Summer Olympics.

On the other hand, the synchronized swimming (water ballet) team, established within the swimming branch in 2008, has also started to play a pioneering role in this sport and has become the most successful club in the Turkish Championships by the end of 2014 with 11 championships By providing 17 athletes to the national team consisting of 26 people, it has started to form the backbone of the team. Fenerbahçe became the team champion at the 4th Vienna Open International Synchronized Swimming Races.

== Honours (Men) ==
=== International competitions ===
- CIJ Meet
  - Winners (2): 2004, 2005
  - Runners-up (2): 1999, 2003

=== National competitions ===
National Championships - 23

- Turkish Winter Championship
  - Winners (10): 1998, 1999, 2000, 2001, 2004, 2005, 2006, 2007, 2008, 2009
- Turkish Summer Championship
  - Winners (8): 1998, 1999, 2000, 2003, 2004, 2005, 2007, 2013
- Turkish Short Course Championship
  - Winners (5): 2007, 2008, 2009, 2010, 2015

== Honours (Women) ==
=== National competitions ===
National Championships - 33 (record)

- Turkish Summer Championship
  - Winners (15): 1998, 1999, 2000, 2003, 2004, 2005, 2006, 2007, 2010, 2011, 2012, 2013, 2014, 2015, 2016
- Turkish Winter Championship
  - Winners (9): 1999, 2000, 2004, 2005, 2006, 2007, 2008, 2009, 2010
- Turkish Short Course Championship
  - Winners (9): 2007, 2008, 2009, 2010, 2012, 2013, 2014, 2015, 2016

Regional Championships

- Istanbul Championship
  - Winners (1): 1933

== Technical and Managerial Staff ==
Name	Nat.	Position
Serkan Tutgun	(Turkey)	Department Captain
Serkan Atasay	(Turkey)	Coach
Volkan Atakan	(Turkey)	Coach
İbrahim Aksoy	(Turkey)	Coach
Fatih Boyraz	(Turkey)	Coach
Gizem Alkan	(Turkey)	Coach
Duygu Karadağ	(Turkey)	Coach
Mesut Erdoğan	(Turkey)	Coach
Erhan Yalınkılınç	(Turkey)	Coach
Türker Oktay	(Turkey)	Coach
Bahar Oktay	(Turkey)	Coach
Lyudmylam Slivinska	(Ukraine)	Coach
Levent Camuşcuoğlu	(Turkey)	Coach
İrfan Gülmez	(Turkey)	Coach
Gökalp Aksoy	(Turkey)	Coach
Larisa Atasay	(Turkey)	Coach

== Current squad ==
Men	Women
Doğuş Akay	Melisa Akarsu
Sinan Aktılav	Duygu Birol
Alican Alaçlı	Gizem Bozkurt
Volkan Atakan	Gizem Çam
Serkan Atasay	Tuğçe Duygun
Demir Atasoy	Deniz Ertan
Bartu Büyükyılmaz	Dilara Buse Günaydın
Gürdal Çelik	Gülşah Günenç
Muzaffer Demirtaş	Eda Güngöroğlu
İlkay Dikmen	Gizem Güvenç
Güven Duvan	İdil Konca
Barış İlhan	Tuğçe Küfeci
Doğuş Kubilayhan	Esma Gizem Papil
Deniz Nazar	Sibel Piroğlu
Eren Onurlu	İris Rosenberger
Uğur Orel Oral	Jasmin Rosenberger
Furkan Öztürk	Deniz Turan
Berkay Özyurt	Gökçe Uğur
Mehmet Buğra Özyurt	Merve Terzioğlu
Yiğit Taşdıvar	Betül Türeci
Kaan Tayla	Halime Zülal Zeren
Kuzey Tunçelli	Ecem Dönmez
Atahan Yaya	Nehir Toker
Yağız Yürüker
Yiğit Yürüker
Cihan Zeren
