= Ela Naz Özdemir =

Turkish swimmer (born 2006)

Personal information
- National team: Turkey
- Born: 23 April 2006 (age 20) Kartal, Istanbul, Turkey

Sport
- Sport: Swimming
- Strokes: Freestyle
- Club: Galatasaray Swimming
Medal record
Women's swimming
Representing Turkey
European Championships
Bronze medal – third place	2024 Belgrade	4×200 m freestyle relay
European Junior Championships
Bronze medal – third place	2021 Rome	4×200 m freestyle relay

Ela Naz Özdemir (born 23 April 2006) is a Turkish swimmer who specializes in freestyle swimming of 200 metre events. She takes part at the 2024 Summer Olympics in Paris, France.

== Early years in sport ==
During her primary school education's fourth grade, Özdemir became in her age category of ten-year-old girls Turkish champion in all the 50 m freestyle, 50 m backstroke, 200 m freestyle and 200 m individual medley events at the 2016 Anatolian Youth Swimming League.

She set a new Turkish record in the 50 m freestyle of U14 25 mSCM with 6.05 in Istanbul, Turkey on 24 December 2020, and another national record in the 200 m freestyle of U16 25 m SCM with 1:58.17 in Istabul on 28 December 2022.

At the 2021 European Junior Swimming Championships in Rome, Italy, she shared the bronze medal with her teammates in the girls' 4 × 200 m freestyle relay event.

== Sport career ==
Özdemir is a member of Galatasaray Swimming in Istanbul.

She won the bronze medal in the 4 × 200 m freestyle relay event at the 2024 European Aquatics Championships in Belgrade, Serbia. The team set a new Turkish record in the same event with 8:01.58 on 17 June 2024.

Özdemir was qualified to represent her country at the 2024 Summer Olympics in Paris, France together with her teammates Gizem Güvenç, Ecem Dönmez and Zehra Bilgin after they placed within the first 16 teams with 8:05.21 in the Women's 4 × 200 m freestyle relay event of the 2024 World Aquatics Championships in Doha, Qatar.

== Personal life ==
Ela Naz Özdemir was born in Istanbul, Turkey on 23 April 2006.

She completed her primary school education at the private Ahmet Şimşek College in Kartal, Istanbul. She is a student at the private science school Nazmi Arıkan Fen Bilimleri Anatolian High School in Kartal.
