= Swimming at the 2024 World Aquatics Championships – Women's 4 × 200 metre freestyle relay =

Women's 4 × 200 metre freestyle relay at the Swimming at the 2024 World Aquatics Championships
- Venue: Aspire Dome
- Location: Doha, Qatar
- Dates: 15 February (heats and final)
- Competitors: 82 from 19 nations
- Teams: 19
- Winning time: 7:47.26

Medalists
gold medal	Ai Yanhan; Gong Zhenqi; Li Bingjie; Yang Peiqi; Ma Yonghui	China
silver medal	Freya Colbert; Abbie Wood; Lucy Hope; Medi Harris	Great Britain
bronze medal	Brianna Throssell; Shayna Jack; Abbey Harkin; Kiah Melverton; Jaclyn Barclay	Australia

The Women's 4 × 200 metre freestyle relay competition at the 2024 World Aquatics Championships was held on 15 February 2024.

== Records ==
Prior to the competition, the existing world and championship records were as follows.

World record	Australia	7:37.50	Fukuoka, Japan	27 July 2023
Competition record	Australia	7:37.50	Fukuoka, Japan	27 July 2023

== Results ==
=== Heats ===
The heats were started at 10:44.

Rank	Heat	Lane	Nation	Swimmers	Time	Notes
1	2	5	China	Yang Peiqi (1:57.57); Ma Yonghui (1:59.18); Gong Zhenqi (1:59.01); Li Bingjie (1:58.62)	7:54.38	Q
2	1	2	New Zealand	Eve Thomas (1:59.07); Erika Fairweather (1:56.16); Summer Osborne (2:02.11); Laticia Transom (1:57.63)	7:54.97	Q
3	2	3	Canada	Emma O'Croinin (1:59.08); Sienna Angove (1:58.26); Katerine Savard (1:59.60); Ella Jansen (1:59.13)	7:56.07	Q
4	1	6	Brazil	Stephanie Balduccini (1:59.90); Gabrielle Roncatto (1:59.00); Aline Rodrigues (1:59.50); Maria Fernanda Costa (1:58.72)	7:57.12	Q
5	2	6	Hungary	Lilla Ábrahám (2:00.08); Dóra Molnár (1:59.78); Ajna Késely (1:59.70); Nikolett Pádár (1:57.90)	7:57.46	Q
6	1	5	Great Britain	Freya Colbert (1:59.89); Abbie Wood (1:58.40); Lucy Hope (2:00.37); Medi Harris (1:59.52)	7:58.18	Q
7	2	4	Australia	Kiah Melverton (1:59.54); Abbey Harkin (1:59.97); Jaclyn Barclay (2:01.95); Brianna Throssell (1:56.73)	7:58.19	Q
8	1	3	Netherlands	Imani de Jong (2:00.58); Yara van Kalmthout (2:01.75); Silke Holkenborg (2:01.32); Marrit Steenbergen (1:54.98)	7:58.63	Q
9	2	2	France	Lucile Tessariol (1:59.22); Assia Touati (2:00.03); Océane Carnez (1:59.66); Giulia Rossi-Bene (2:00.36)	7:59.27	
10	1	7	Italy	Sofia Morini (1:59.33); Giulia Ramatelli (2:00.30); Emma Menicci (2:00.65); Giulia D'Innocenzo (1:59.91)	8:00.19	
11	1	4	United States	Addison Sauickie (1:59.39); Kayla Han (1:59.79); Kate Hurst (2:00.38); Rachel Klinker (2:02.41)	8:01.97	
12	1	8	Turkey	Ela Naz Özdemir (2:00.52); Gizem Güvenç (2:01.04); Merve Tuncel (2:02.26); Ecem Dönmez (2:01.39)	8:05.21	
13	1	1	Austria	Iris Julia Berger (2:00.64); Marlene Kahler (2:01.51); Lena Opatril (2:02.97); Lena Kreundl (2:00.88)	8:06.00	
14	2	7	South Korea	Han Da-kyung (2:02.01); Hur Yeon-kyung (2:00.08); Kim Seo-yeong (1:59.42); Park Su-jin (2:04.89)	8:06.40	
15	2	8	Belgium	Valentine Dumont (1:58.43); Camille Henveaux (2:01.32); Lucie Hanquet (2:04.03); Lotte Vanhauwaert (2:02.78)	8:06.56	
16	2	9	Slovenia	Janja Šegel (1:59.30); Katja Fain (2:02.49); Neža Klančar (2:03.75); Hana Sekuti (2:03.78)	8:09.32	
17	1	0	Greece	Artemis Vasilaki (2:02.50); Zacharoula Kalogeri (2:02.74); Maria Zafeiratou (2:04.04); Anastasia Boutou (2:04.31)	8:13.59	NR
18	2	1	Hong Kong	Gilaine Ma (2:06.52); Li Sum Yiu (2:12.82); Nip Tsz Yin (2:10.66); Mok Sze Ki (2:07.41)	8:37.41	
	2	0	Philippines		DNS	

=== Final ===
The final was held at 20:45.

Rank	Lane	Nation	Swimmers	Time	Notes
1st place, gold medalist(s)	4	China	Ai Yanhan (1:57.65); Gong Zhenqi (1:58.84); Li Bingjie (1:54.59); Yang Peiqi (1:56.18)	7:47.26	
2nd place, silver medalist(s)	7	Great Britain	Freya Colbert (1:57.14); Abbie Wood (1:56.65); Lucy Hope (1:58.71); Medi Harris (1:58.40)	7:50.90	
3rd place, bronze medalist(s)	1	Australia	Brianna Throssell (1:56.87); Shayna Jack (1:57.61); Abbey Harkin (1:58.92); Kiah Melverton (1:58.01)	7:51.41	
4	6	Brazil	Maria Fernanda Costa (1:57.30); Stephanie Balduccini (1:57.64); Aline Rodrigues (1:59.73); Gabrielle Roncatto (1:58.04)	7:52.71	SA
5	5	New Zealand	Erika Fairweather (1:56.37); Laticia Transom (1:58.41); Eve Thomas (1:58.65); Caitlin Deans (1:59.59)	7:53.02	
6	3	Canada	Rebecca Smith (1:58.70); Emma O'Croinin (1:58.83); Sienna Angove (1:58.59); Taylor Ruck (1:59.59)	7:55.71	
7	8	Netherlands	Imani de Jong (2:00.56); Silke Holkenborg (2:00.95); Marrit Steenbergen (1:54.89); Janna van Kooten (1:59.44)	7:55.84	
8	2	Hungary	Nikolett Pádár (1:57.06); Lilla Ábrahám (2:00.51); Dóra Molnár (1:59.21); Ajna Késely (1:59.80)	7:56.58	
