= 2021 European Junior Swimming Championships =

Water sport competitions

- Host city: Rome, Italy
- Dates: 6-11 July 2021
- Main venue: Stadio Olimpico del Nuoto

The 2021 European Junior Swimming Championships were held from 6 to 11 July 2021 in Rome, Italy at the Stadio Olimpico del Nuoto. The Championships were organized by LEN, the European Swimming League, and were held in a 50-meter pool. The Championships were for girls aged 14–17 and boys age 15–18.

== Results ==
=== Boys ===
Games	Gold		Silver		Bronze	
50 m freestyle	David Popovici; Romania	22.22	Nikita Chernousov; Russia	22.83	Martin Kartavi; Israel	22.92
100 m freestyle	David Popovici; Romania	47.30; WJR	Edward Mildred; Great Britain	48.77	Mateusz Chowaniec; Poland	49.37
200 m freestyle	David Popovici; Romania	1:45.95	Mateusz Chowaniec; Poland	1:47.78	Jovan Lekić; Bosnia and Herzegovina	1:48.46
400 m freestyle	Batuhan Filiz; Turkey	3:50.68	Jovan Lekić; Bosnia and Herzegovina	3:50.79	David Koutný; Czech Republic	3:51.06
800 m freestyle	Yiğit Aslan; Turkey	7:51.20; CR	Mert Kılavuz; Turkey	7:52.19	Luca De Tullio; Italy	7:58.10
1500 m freestyle	Mert Kılavuz; Turkey	15:02.22	Dávid Betlehem; Hungary	15:02.28	Yiğit Aslan; Turkey	15:05.08
50 m backstroke	Aleksei Tkachev; Russia	25.14	Ksawery Masiuk; Poland	25.28	Anastasios Kougkoulos; Greece	25.63
100 m backstroke	Ksawery Masiuk; Poland	53.91	Oleksandr Zheltyakov; Ukraine	53.98	Aleksei Tkachev; Russia	54.34
200 m backstroke	Ksawery Masiuk; Poland	1:58.41	Berke Saka; Turkey	1:59.02	Kaloyan Levterov; Bulgaria	1:59.13
50 m breaststroke	Simone Cerasuolo; Italy	27.29	Rostyslav Kryzhanivskyy; Ukraine	27.75	Volodymyr Lisovets; Ukraine Bartosz Skóra; Poland	27.94
100 m breaststroke	Volodymyr Lisovets; Ukraine	1:00.28	Aleksas Savickas; Lithuania	1:01.29	Simone Cerasuolo; Italy	1:01.56
200 m breaststroke	Aleksas Savickas; Lithuania	2:13.35	Dmitrii Askhabov; Russia	2:13.37	Maksym Tkachuk; Ukraine	2:13.75
50 m butterfly	Josif Miladinov; Bulgaria	23.59	Tobias Schulrath; Germany	23.72	Daniel Gráčik; Czech Republic	23.79
100 m butterfly	Josif Miladinov; Bulgaria	52.00	Diogo Ribeiro; Portugal	52.54	Edward Mildred; Great Britain	52.72
200 m butterfly	Krzysztof Chmielewski; Poland	1:56.29	Michał Chmielewski; Poland	1:57.09	Vadim Klimenishchev; Russia	1:57.49
200 m individual medley	Berke Saka; Turkey	2:00.04	Vadym Naumenko; Ukraine	2:00.65	Cedric Büssing; Germany	2:01.84
400 m individual medley	Cedric Büssing; Germany	4:17.40	Jakub Bursa; Czech Republic	4:19.20	Artem Vorobev; Russia	4:20.21
4×100 m freestyle relay	Russia Daniil Kosenkov (50.09); Oleg Levchenko (50.24); Renal Nazipov (50.43); Vladislav Reznichenko (48.90); Egor Matyushkov	3:19.66	Romania David Popovici (47.56) WJR; Mihai Gergely (50.39); Ştefan Cozma (50.94); Patrick Dinu (51.04)	3:19.93	Poland Ksawery Masiuk (50.09); Krzysztof Matuszewski (50.45); Nazar Żurawel (50.49); Mateusz Chowaniec (48.93); Kacper Bidowaniec	3:19.96
4×200 m freestyle relay	Russia Daniil Kosenkov (1:50.96); Maksim Khadanovich (1:50.71); Aleksandr Chiknaikin (1:50.91); Vladislav Reznichenko (1:48.48)	7:21.06	Germany Cedric Büssing (1:51.80); Silas Beth (1:50.30); Kiran Winkler (1:51.33); Timo Sorgius (1:48.20)	7:21.63	Italy Lorenzo Galossi (1:50.32); Davide Dalla Costa (1:50.36); Giovanni Gallina (1:52.52); Matteo Oppioli (1:49.20)	7:22.40
4×100 m medley relay	Poland Ksawery Masiuk (54.41); Bartosz Skóra (1:01.34); Paweł Uryniuk (52.92); Mateusz Chowaniec (48.79); Filip Kosiński	3:37.46	Russia Aleksei Tkachev (55.24); Georgii Glazunov (1:01.84); Vadim Klimenishchev (52.89); Vladislav Reznichenko (49.33); Arsenii Smykov; Dmitrii Askhabov; Dmitry Novichkov; Daniil Kosenkov	3:39.30	Ukraine Oleksandr Zheltyakov (54.51); Volodymyr Lisovets (1:00.55); Andriy Kovalenko (53.06); Vadym Ivchenko (51.31); Artem Chobotar	3:39.43

=== Girls ===
Games	Gold		Silver		Bronze	
50 m freestyle	Daria Tatarinova; Russia	24.87; CR, EJR	Jana Pavalić; Croatia	25.35	Eva Okaro; Great Britain	25.45
100 m freestyle	Daria Klepikova; Russia	54.75	Daria Tatarinova; Russia	55.12	Evelyn Davis; Great Britain	55.25
200 m freestyle	Nikolett Pádár; Hungary	1:59.38	Tamryn van Selm; Great Britain	1:59.50	Beril Böcekler; Turkey	1:59.73
400 m freestyle	Merve Tuncel; Turkey	4:06.25	Bettina Fábián; Hungary	4:10.16	Giulia Vetrano; Italy	4:12.23
800 m freestyle	Merve Tuncel; Turkey	8:21.91; CR, EJR	Beril Böcekler; Turkey	8:33.52	Giulia Vetrano; Italy	8:35.84
1500 m freestyle	Merve Tuncel; Turkey	15:55.23; CR, EJR	Deniz Ertan; Turkey	16:14.26	Paula Otero; Spain	16:19.92
50 m backstroke	Carmen Weiler; Spain	28.42	Nina Stanisavljević; Serbia	28.58	Erika Gaetani; Italy	28.84
100 m backstroke	Erika Gaetani; Italy	1:00.65	Mary-Ambre Moluh; France Katie Shanahan; Great Britain	1:00.93	Not awarded	
200 m backstroke	Laura Bernat; Poland	2:10.14	Katie Shanahan; Great Britain	2:11.27	Erika Gaetani; Italy	2:11.46
50 m breaststroke	Benedetta Pilato; Italy	30.13	Elena Bogomolova; Russia	30.68	Eneli Jefimova; Estonia	30.91
100 m breaststroke	Eneli Jefimova; Estonia	1:07.24	Elena Bogomolova; Russia	1:07.25	Karolina Piechowicz; Poland	1:08.93
200 m breaststroke	Justine Delmas; France	2:25.54	Eneli Jefimova; Estonia	2:28.01	Elena Bogomolova; Russia	2:28.24
50 m butterfly	Daria Klepikova; Russia	26.14; CR	Lana Pudar; Bosnia and Herzegovina	26.29	Roos Vanotterdijk; Belgium	26.55
100 m butterfly	Lana Pudar; Bosnia and Herzegovina	57.56	Daria Klepikova; Russia	58.07	Anastasiia Markova; Russia	58.73
200 m butterfly	Anastasiia Markova; Russia	2:08.41; CR	Lana Pudar; Bosnia and Herzegovina	2:09.59	Lucie Delmas; France	2:10.42
200 m individual medley	Katie Shanahan; Great Britain	2:13.13	Anastasiia Sorokina; Russia	2:13.84	Panna Ugrai; Hungary	2:14.37
400 m individual medley	Katie Shanahan; Great Britain	4:42.59	Deniz Ertan; Turkey	4:43.65	Anastasiia Sorokina; Russia	4:45.58
4×100 m freestyle relay	Russia Daria Tatarinova (55.29); Daria Trofimova (54.61); Aleksandra Kurilkina (55.67); Daria Klepikova (54.53); Anastasiia Saratova; Viktoriia Starostina; Aleksandra Sabitova	3:40.10; CR	Great Britain Eva Okaro (55.36); Harriet Rodgers (56.42); Evelyn Davis (55.85); Tamryn van Selm (54.64)	3:42.27	Hungary Nikolett Pádár (56.12); Panna Ugrai (55.60); Dóra Molnár (56.20); Réka Nyirádi (55.94); Lili Gyurinovics	3:43.86
4×200 m freestyle relay	Hungary Laura Veres (2:00.32); Bettina Fábián (2:00.52); Réka Nyirádi (2:00.31); Nikolett Pádár (1:59.80)	8:00.95	Russia Aleksandra Sabitova (2:01.28); Daria Trofimova (1:59.76); Aleksandra Kudriavtseva (2:02.78); Viktoriia Starostina (2:00.96)	8:04.78	Turkey Beril Böcekler (2:02.66); Merve Tuncel (2:00.27); Ela Naz Özdemir (2:03.83); Deniz Ertan (2:02.35)	8:09.11
4×100 m medley relay	Russia Aleksandra Kurilkina (1:03.26); Elena Bogomolova (1:06.79); Anastasiia Markova (58.12); Daria Klepikova (54.55); Iuliia Beznosova; Daria Lunina; Daria Trofimova	4:02.72	France Mary-Ambre Moluh (1:01.41); Justine Delmas (1:07.54); Lucie Delmas (59.08); Lucie Vasquez (55.66); Chloé Brown; Camille Tissandié	4:03.69	Great Britain Katie Shanahan (1:01.83); Leah Schlosshan (1:11.09); Lucy Grieve (59.88); Tamryn van Selm (54.69); Isabelle Goodwin; Eva Okaro	4:07.49

=== Mixed events ===
Games	Gold		Silver		Bronze	
4×100 m freestyle relay	Russia Vladislav Reznichenko (49.61); Daniil Kosenkov (50.41); Daria Tatarinova (54.56); Daria Klepikova (55.13); Oleg Levchenko; Renal Nazipov; Daria Trofimova; Aleksandra Kurilkina	3:29.71	Italy Matteo Oppioli (50.25); Davide Dalla Costa (49.12); Matilde Biagiotti (56.07); Viola Petrini (56.26); Samuele Congia; Luca Serio; Gaia Pesenti	3:31.70	Hungary Dániel Mészáros (50.42); Boldizsár Magda (50.48); Nikolett Pádár (55.49); Panna Ugrai (55.46)	3:31.85
4×100 m medley relay	Russia Aleksei Tkachev (54.84); Georgii Glazunov (1:01.86); Daria Klepikova (58.89); Daria Tatarinova (54.66); Aleksandra Kurilkina; Dmitrii Askhabov; Vadim Klimenishchev; Daria Trofimova	3:50.25	Great Britain Katie Shanahan (1:01.75); Harvey Freeman (1:02.62); Edward Mildred (52.14); Evelyn Davis (54.97); Evan Jones	3:51.48	Ukraine Oleksandr Zheltyakov (54.44); Volodymyr Lisovets (1:01.55); Viktoriya Kostromina (1:01.62); Karyna Snitko (56.42); Rostyslav Kryzhanivskyy; Anastasiya Yermishyna	3:54.03

== Team Trophy ==
Results:

Rank	Team	Points
1	Russia	871
2	Italy	615
3	Poland	553
4	Germany	524
5	Great Britain	512
6	Hungary	504
7	Turkey	449
8	Ukraine	322
9	France	288
10	Spain	264

Rank	Team	Points
11	Romania	152
12	Serbia	134
13	Czech Republic	117
14	Bulgaria	114
15	Bosnia and Herzegovina	107
16	Israel	106
17	Croatia	102
18	Portugal	101
19	Greece	92
20	Switzerland	91

== Medal table ==
* Host nation (Italy)

Rank	Nation	Gold	Silver	Bronze	Total
1	Russia	11	9	6	26
2	Turkey	7	5	3	15
3	Poland	5	3	4	12
4	Italy*	3	1	7	11
5	Romania	3	1	0	4
6	Great Britain	2	6	4	12
7	Hungary	2	2	3	7
8	Bulgaria	2	0	1	3
9	Ukraine	1	3	4	8
10	Bosnia and Herzegovina	1	3	1	5
11	France	1	2	1	4
11	Germany	1	2	1	4
13	Estonia	1	1	1	3
14	Lithuania	1	1	0	2
15	Spain	1	0	1	2
16	Czech Republic	0	1	2	3
17	Croatia	0	1	0	1
17	Portugal	0	1	0	1
17	Serbia	0	1	0	1
20	Belgium	0	0	1	1
20	Greece	0	0	1	1
20	Israel	0	0	1	1
Totals (22 entries)		42	43	42	127
