= Rostyslav Kryzhanivskyy =

Ukrainian swimmer (born 2004)

Personal information
- Full name: Rostyslav Arturovych Kryzhanivskyy
- Born: 5 September 2004 (age 21) Vyshgorod, Ukraine

Sport
- Sport: Swimming
- Strokes: Breaststroke
Medal record
Men's swimming
Representing Ukraine
European Junior Championships
Silver medal – second place	2021 Rome	50 m breaststroke
Bronze medal – third place	2021 Rome	4 x 100 m mixed medley relay
European Youth Olympic Festival
Gold medal – first place	2019 Baku	100 m breaststroke
Silver medal – second place	2019 Baku	200 m breaststroke

Rostyslav Arturovych Kryzhanivskyy (Ukrainian: Ростислав Артурович Крижанівський, born 5 September 2004) is a Ukrainian swimmer.

== Early life and education ==
Rostyslav was born on 5 September 2004 in Vyshgorod, Ukraine. He studied at the local school No. 1 in Vyshgorod.

== Career ==
Rostyslav broke the junior national record in 100 m breaststroke in 2018.

In 2019, Rostyslav represented Ukraine at the 2019 European Youth Summer Olympic Festival, held in Baku, where he won a gold medal in 100 m breaststroke and a silver one in 200 m breaststroke. Also he competed in Multinations Youth Swimming Meet 2019, held in Graz, Austria, where he received two gold medals in 100 m breaststroke (the national junior record) and also in 200 m breaststroke.

In 2020, he broke a national junior record in 50 m breaststroke at the Ukrainian National Swimming Championships in Dnipro.

In the following years, he competed at the 2020 European Aquatics Championships in 50, 100 and 200 metres breaststroke without reaching a final.

Also he competed at the 2021 European Junior Swimming Championships, where he won a silver medal in 50 m breaststroke and a bronze one in 4 × 100 m medley relay mixed.

Then he represented Ukraine at the 2021 FINA World Swimming Championships (25 m) in 50 m breaststroke without reaching a medal.
