= Gizem Güvenç =

Turkish swimmer (born 2002)

Personal information
- National team: Turkey
- Born: 9 August 2002 (age 23) Turkey

Sport
- Sport: Swimming
- Strokes: Freestyle
- Club: Fenerbahçe Swimming
Medal record
Women's swimming
Representing Turkey
European Championships
Bronze medal – third place	2024 Belgrade	4×200 m freestyle relay
Islamic Solidarity Games
Gold medal – first place	2025 Riyadh	4×100 m freestyle
Gold medal – first place	2025 Riyadh	4×200 m freestyle
Gold medal – first place	2025 Riyadh	4×100 m medley
Gold medal – first place	2025 Riyadh	4×100 m mixed freestyle
Gold medal – first place	2025 Riyadh	4×100 m mixed medley
Silver medal – second place	2025 Riyadh	100 m freestyle

Gizem Güvenç (born 9 August 2002) is a Turkish swimmer who specializes in freestyle swimming of 100 m and 200 m events. She holds a number of national records in various events. She took part at the 2024 Summer Olympics in Paris, France.

== Sport career ==
Güvenç is a member of Fenerbahçe Swimming in Istanbul.

Güvenç competed in the 4×100 m freestyle relay event at the 2019 World Aquatics Championships in Gwangju, South Korea.

She won the bronze medal together with Ela Naz Özdemir, Ecem Dönmez and Zehra Duru Bilgin in the 4×200 m freestyle relay event at the 2024 European Aquatics Championships in Belgrade, Serbia.

She was qualified to represent her country at the 2024 Summer Olympics in Paris, France together with her teammates Ela Naz Özdemir, Ecem Dönmez and Zehra Bilgin within the first 16 teams with 8:05.21 in the Women's 4 × 200 m freestyle relay event of the 2024 World Aquatics Championships in Doha, Qatar.

== National records ==
Date	Age Category	Course	Event	Time	Venue	Ref
2015-08-14	U13	LCM	200 m freestyle	2:05.99	Istanbul	
2015-12-13	U13	LCM	100 m freestyle	:58.21	Istanbul	
2016-07-23	U14	LCM	100 m freestyle	:57.53	Istanbul	
2016-07-24	U14	LCM	50 m freestyle	26.74	Istanbul	
2017-07-25	U15	LCM	50 m freestyle	56.80	Istanbul	
2018-11-17	U16	SCM	100 m freestyle	54.64	Istanbul	
2018-11-30	U16	LCM	50 m freestyle	26.13	Istanbul	
2018-12-01	U16	LCM	100 m freestyle	56.24	Istanbul	
2018-12-27	U16	SCM	100 m medley	1:02.87	Istanbul	
2019-07-21		LCM	4×100 m freestyle relay	3:43.03	Gwangju, South Korea	
2019-12-20	U16	SCM	4x100 m freestyle relay	3:38.570	Istanbul	
2019-12-20	U16	SCM	4×50 m freestyle relay	1:40.00	Istanbul	
2019-12-21	U17	SCM	200 m freestyle	1:55.91	Istanbul	
2019-12-21	+U19	SCM	200 m freestyle	1:55.91	Istanbul	
2019-12-26	U17	LCM	200 m freestyle	1:58.61	Istanbul	
2020-03-13	U18	LCM	200 m freestyle	1:58.24	Istanbul	
2020-12-20	U18	LCM	4×50 m freestyle relay	1:40.00	Istanbul	
2022-12-26	U20	LCM	4×200 m freestyle relay	7:57.90	ıstanbul	
2024-06-17		LCM	4×200 m freestyle relay	8:01.58	Belgrade, Serbia	

- SCM: Short course (25 meter)
- LCM Long course (50 meter)

== Personal life ==
Gizem Güvenç was born on 9 August 2002.
