= Daria Klepikova =

Russian swimmer (born 2005)

Personal information
- Full name: Daria Sergeevna Klepikova
- National team: Russia
- Born: 11 February 2005 (age 21) Voronezh, Russia

Sport
- Sport: Swimming
- Strokes: Butterfly, freestyle
Medal record
Women's swimming
Representing Neutral Athletes B
World Championships (LC)
Gold medal – first place	2025 Singapore	4×100 m mixed medley
Silver medal – second place	2025 Singapore	4x100 m mixed freestyle
World Championships (SC)
Gold medal – first place	2024 Budapest	4×50 m mixed medley
Gold medal – first place	2024 Budapest	4×100 m mixed medley
European Championships (LC)
Gold medal – first place	2026 Paris	4x100 m mixed freestyle
Bronze medal – third place	2026 Paris	100 m butterfly
Bronze medal – third place	2026 Paris	4x100 m freestyle
Bronze medal – third place	2026 Paris	4×100 m medley
Bronze medal – third place	2026 Paris	4x200 m freestyle
Bronze medal – third place	2026 Paris	4×100 m mixed medley
Bronze medal – third place	2026 Paris	4×200 m mixed freestyle
Representing Russia
European Championships (SC)
Gold medal – first place	2021 Kazan	4×50 m freestyle
Gold medal – first place	2021 Kazan	4×50 m medley
European Junior Championships
Gold medal – first place	2021 Rome	100 m freestyle
Gold medal – first place	2021 Rome	50 m butterfly
Gold medal – first place	2021 Rome	4×100 m freestyle
Gold medal – first place	2021 Rome	4×100 m mixed freestyle
Gold medal – first place	2021 Rome	4×100 m medley
Gold medal – first place	2021 Rome	4×100 m mixed medley
Silver medal – second place	2021 Rome	100 m butterfly

Daria Sergeevna Klepikova (Russian: Дарья Сергеевна Клепикова; born 11 February 2005) is a Russian competitive swimmer. She is a Russian record holder in the short course 4×50 metre freestyle relay and 4×50 metre medley relay. She won two gold medals at the 2021 European Short Course Championships, one in the 4×50 metre freestyle relay and one in the 4×50 metre medley relay, swimming freestyle on each finals relay. At the 2021 European Junior Championships she won six gold medals and one silver medal in individual and relay events.

== Background ==
Klepikova was born 11 February 2005 in the Voronezh region of Russia. She competes for the Voronezh Oblast region in Russian competitions.

== Career ==
=== 2019 ===
When Klepikova was 14 years old, she competed at the 2019 European Junior Swimming Championships, held in July in Klepikova's home-country of Russia, where she placed fifth in the final of the 50 metre freestyle with a time of 25.56 seconds, finished sixth in the final of the 50 metre butterfly in 27.29 seconds, and placed sixteenth in the preliminaries of the 100 metre butterfly with a time of 1:01.35.

=== 2021: Double European junior champion at 16 years old ===
==== 2021 European Junior Championships ====
2021 European Junior Championships
Gold medal – first place	100 m freestyle	54.75
Gold medal – first place	4×100 m mixed freestyle	3:29.71
Gold medal – first place	4×100 m mixed medley	3:50.25
Gold medal – first place	50 m butterfly	26.14 (CR)
Gold medal – first place	4×100 m freestyle	3:40.10 (CR)
Gold medal – first place	4×100 m medley	4:02.72
Silver medal – second place	100 m butterfly	58.07

On the first day of competition, 6 July, of the 2021 European Junior Championships at Stadio Olimpico del Nuoto in Rome, Italy, 16-year-old Klepikova advanced to the final of the 100 metre freestyle ranked first with a time of 55.04 seconds. Day two, Klepikova won the gold medal in the 100 metre freestyle with a time of 54.75 seconds, finishing over a quarter of a second ahead of silver medalist and fellow Russian Daria Tatarinova. For her second gold medal of day two, Klepikova swam the anchor, fourth, leg of 4×100 meter mixed freestyle relay, slitting a time of 55.13 seconds to help the relay touch the wall first with a time of 3:29.71. In the final of the 4×100 metre mixed medley relay on the third day, Klepikova swam the 100 metres of butterfly on the relay in a time of 58.89 seconds, contributing to the relay finishing first with a time of 3:50.25 and winning the gold medal.

The fifth day, 10 July, Klepikova won her second gold medal in an individual event in the 50 metre butterfly where she won the event in a Championships record time of 26.14 seconds, which broke the former record of 26.21 seconds set in 2019 by Naele Portecop of France. Later in the same day five finals session, Klepikova won her second gold medal of the day in Championships record time in the 4×100 metre freestyle relay, contributing to the new record time of 3:40.10 by splitting a 54.53 for the anchor leg of the relay. Come the final day of competition, 11 July, Klepikova won her only silver medal of the championships by placing second in the final of the 100 metre butterfly with a personal best time of 58.07 seconds. She won her final gold medal of the Championships in the 4×100 metre medley relay, swimming the anchoring leg of the relay, the freestyle leg of the relay, in 54.55 seconds to achieve a first-place-finish for the relay team in 4:02.72.

==== 2021 European Short Course Championships ====
2021 European Championships (SC)
Gold medal – first place	4×50 m freestyle	1:34.92 (NR)
Gold medal – first place	4×50 m medley	1:44.19 (NR)

At the 2021 European Short Course Championships held at the Palace of Water Sports in Kazan in November, Klepikova won her first gold medal in the 4×50 metre freestyle relay, where she split a 23.63 on the anchor leg of the relay to help the relay team finish in a new Russian record time of 1:34.92. Klepikova won her second gold medal of the Championships in the 4×50 metre medley relay, where she helped set a new Russian record of 1:44.19 for the event by splitting a 23.81 for the freestyle leg of the relay. For her performances setting two Russian records and winning two gold medals as a 16-year-old in the senior international competition, Swimming World named her as one of "The Young Talents" for the Championships.

==== 2021 World Short Course Championships ====
In late November, Klepikova was announced to the roster for Russia at the 2021 World Short Course Championships to be held at Etihad Arena in Abu Dhabi, United Arab Emirates in mid-December. The first day of competition, 16 December, Kelpikova split a 53.81 for the anchor leg of the 4×100 metre freestyle relay, helping advance it to the final ranked fifth. The finals relay, which did not include Klepikova, went on to place sixth. In the prelims heats of the 100 metre butterfly on day five, Klepikova ranked 21st overall with a time of 57.86 seconds and did not advance to the semifinals. The sixth and final day of competition Klepikova started off the day by swimming the second leg of the 4×50 metre freestyle relay with a split of 24.53 and helping qualify the relay to the final ranking fourth. For her second event Klepikova split a 58.45 on the butterfly leg of the 4×100 metre medley relay in the prelims to help achieve a rank of fifth and qualify the relay to the final with a time of 3:55.15. Klepikova was substituted out for the final of both relays, where the 4×50 metre freestyle relay placed fifth and the 4×100 metre medley relay placed fifth.

During competition, Klepikova and all other Russians were required to compete without the name of their country name, flag, and anthem, instead swimming under the name Russian Swimming Federation per the Court of Arbitration for Sport ban not allowing the usage of such representation items by Russians at any World Championships in any sport between 17 December 2020 and 16 December 2022, inclusive.

=== 2022: Doubly banned for her nationality ===
In March 2022, at 17 years of age, Klepikova was banned from all LEN competitions indefinitely, rending her incapable of defending her European junior titles in the 50 metre butterfly and 100 metre freestyle from 2021 and denying her the chance to make her debut at a LEN European Aquatics Championships at least past the 2022 European Aquatics Championships. Additionally due to her being Russian, she was banned from FINA competitions starting 21 April 2022 and at least through 31 December 2022, which denied her the opportunity to compete at the last FINA World Junior Swimming Championships she was eligible for and the first she was fast enough to compete at, the 2022 FINA World Junior Swimming Championships. However, had she been allowed to compete at the World Junior Championships, she would have been subjected to the same band that did not allow her to use her country name, flag, nor anthem at the 2021 World Short Course Championships, only this time in her own country. For all non-FINA competitions from April through December 2022, she and all other Russians had their times deemed as not counting towards world rankings and world records, including world junior records.

Instead, Klepikova focused her efforts on competing in Russia, achieving a personal best time of 54.45 seconds in the 100 metre freestyle at the 2022 Russian Championships in April. At the first of two parts of the 2022 Russian Solidarity Games, a multi-sport and multi-country event, with swimming contested in long course metres in July in Kazan, she won the silver medal in the 50 metre freestyle, finishing in a personal best time of 25.05 seconds. On 26 August, she won the gold medal in the 100 metre butterfly at the Summer Spartakiad with a personal best time of 57.97 seconds.

Later in the year, at the second part of the 2022 Russian Solidarity Games, with swimming contested in short course metres in November, 17-year-old Klepikova won the bronze medal in the 50 metre butterfly with a personal best time of 25.69 seconds. She also won a silver medal in the 100 metre butterfly with a personal best time of 57.43 seconds, which was 1.13 seconds behind gold medalist and fellow Russian Arina Surkova, who set a new Russian record in the event.

=== 2023 ===
In March 2023, World Aquatics announced a change in competition regulations allowing female swimmers to compete as junior swimmers through the year they are 18 years of age on 31 December, meaning female swimmers such as Klepikova (18 years of age at the end of the year in 2023) became age-eligible to compete as juniors through the end of 2023, where they had not previously been age-eligible as the age cut-off was 17 years of age. Thirty-tree days later, World Aquatics announced the extension of its 2022 ban was still in effect indefinitely.

2023 Russian Championships (LC)
Silver medal – second place	100 m freestyle	54.49
Bronze medal – third place	4×200 m freestyle	8:10.99
Bronze medal – third place	50 m butterfly	26.08
Bronze medal – third place	100 m butterfly	58.35

Klepikova won her first medal of the 2023 Russian National Championships on day one, 16 April, in the 4×200 metre freestyle relay, splitting a 2:00.06 for the anchor leg of the relay to contribute to the bronze medal-winning time of 8:10.99 for the Voronezh Oblast region relay team. On the evening of day two, she ranked fourth and qualified for the final of the 100 metre freestyle with a time of 55.01 seconds in the semifinals of the event. The next day, she qualified for the semifinals of the 50 metre butterfly with a rank of sixth and time of 27.02 in the morning preliminaries. For her first event of the evening session, the 50 metre butterfly semifinals, she qualified for the final with an overall rank of sixth and a time of 26.72 seconds. In her second of two events for the evening, she won the silver medal in the 100 metre freestyle with a time of 54.49 seconds, finishing 0.20 seconds behind gold medalist Daria Trofimova. On day four, she won the bronze medal in the 50 metre butterfly with a time of 26.08 seconds.

For the preliminaries session on day five, Klepikova achieved semifinals-qualifying performances in both the 100 metre butterfly, fifth-rank with a 1:00.25, and the 50 metre freestyle, tie for fourth-rank with a 25.51. Following up with a 59.20 in the semifinals of the 100 metre butterfly, she qualified for the event final. Later in the evening session, she was disqualified in the semifinals of the 50 metre freestyle. The final day, she won the bronze medal in the 100 metre butterfly final with a time of 58.35 seconds.

== International championships (50 m) ==
Meet	50 free	100 free	50 fly	100 fly	4×100 free	4×100 medley	4×100 mixed free	4×100 mixed medley
EJC 2019	5th		6th	16th (h)				
EJC 2021		1st place, gold medalist(s)	1st place, gold medalist(s)	2nd place, silver medalist(s)	1st place, gold medalist(s)	1st place, gold medalist(s)	1st place, gold medalist(s)	1st place, gold medalist(s)

== International championships (25 m) ==
Meet	50 free	50 fly	100 fly	4×50 free	4×100 free	4×50 medley	4×100 medley
EC 2021	18th	19th	9th	1st place, gold medalist(s)	—N/a	1st place, gold medalist(s)	—N/a
WC 2021			21st	5th^{[a]}	6th^{[a]}		5th^{[a]}

^{a} Klepikova swam only in the preliminaries.

== Personal best times ==
=== Long course metres (50 m pool) ===
Event	Time	Meet	Location	Date	Age	Ref
50 m freestyle	25.05	2022 Solidarity Games	Kazan	24 July 2022	17	
100 m freestyle	54.45	2022 Russian National Championships	Kazan	26 April 2022	17	
50 m butterfly	25.98	2021 Russian Championships	Kazan	5 April 2021	16	
100 m butterfly	57.97	2022 Summer Spartakiad	Saint Petersburg	26 August 2022	17	

=== Short course metres (25 m pool) ===
Event	Time	Meet	Location	Date	Age	Ref
50 m freestyle	24.38	2021 FINA Swimming World Cup	Kazan	28 October 2021	16	
100 m freestyle	53.22	2021 FINA Swimming World Cup	Kazan	30 October 2021	16	
50 m butterfly	25.69	2022 Solidarity Games	Kazan	23 November 2022	17	
100 m butterfly	57.43	2022 Solidarity Games	Kazan	25 November 2022	17	

== National records ==
=== Short course metres ===
No.	Event	Time	Meet	Location	Date	Age	Status	Ref
1	4×50 m freestyle relay	1:34.92	2021 European Championships	Kazan	2 November 2021	16	Current	
2	4×50 m medley relay	1:44.19	2021 European Championships	Kazan	4 November 2021	16	Current	

== Awards and honours ==
- Swimming World, The Young Talents: 2021 European Short Course Championships

== See also ==
- List of European Short Course Swimming Championships medalists (women)
