= Croatia at the 2022 European Youth Summer Olympic Festival =

in (Slovakia) Banská Bystrica 24 July 2022 – 30 July 2022
- Competitors: 76 in 8 sports
- Medals Ranked 11th: Gold 5 Silver 4 Bronze 0 Total 9

European Youth Summer Olympic Festival appearances
- 1993 • 1995 • 1997 • 1999 • 2001 • 2003 • 2005 • 2007 • 2009 • 2011 • 2013 • 2015 • 2017 • 2019 • 2022 • 2023

Croatia competed at the 2022 European Youth Summer Olympic Festival from 24 to 30 July 2023 in Banská Bystrica, Slovakia with 76 participants (44 male, 32 female) in 8 sports (Athletics, Badminton, Cycling, Gymnastics, Judo, Basketball, Swimming and Handball). In collective sports, basketball players and female and male handball players participated.

== Flagbearers ==
Croatian flagbearers at the opening ceremony were athlete Jana Koščak and handball player Petar Šprem.

== Medals ==
Croatian won 9 medals: 5 gold and 4 silver ones, with this EYOF being most successful for Croatia to date.

Medal winners were:

- Gold Anna Ćurković (athletics, long jump)
- Gold Lara Jurčić (athletics, 200 m)
- Gold Jana Koščak (athletics, high jump)
- Gold Lucijana Lukšić (swimming, 200 m freestyle)
- Gold Jana Pavalić (swimming, 50 m freestyle)
- Silver Janko Kišak (athletics, 110 m hurdles)
- Silver Jana Pavalić (swimming, 100 m freestyle)
- Silver Vita Penezić (athletics, 100 m)
- Silver Mia Wild (athletics, 100 m hurdles)
