= Swimming at the 2022 European Youth Summer Olympic Festival =

- Venue: Sports park Swimming
- Date: 25–29 July
- Competitors: 332 from 44 nations

Swimming at the 2022 European Youth Summer Olympic Festival was held at the Sports park Swimming in Banská Bystrica, Slovakia from 25 to 29 July 2022.

== Medal table ==
* Host nation (Slovakia)

Rank	Nation	Gold	Silver	Bronze	Total
1	Italy (ITA)	11	7	2	20
2	Great Britain (GBR)	4	2	4	10
3	Germany (GER)	3	2	8	13
4	Spain (ESP)	3	1	0	4
5	Hungary (HUN)	2	2	4	8
6	Lithuania (LTU)	2	2	1	5
7	Croatia (CRO)	2	1	0	3
8	Turkey (TUR)	1	5	0	6
9	France (FRA)	1	3	0	4
10	Denmark (DEN)	1	1	2	4
10	Ukraine (UKR)	1	1	2	4
12	Israel (ISR)	1	0	0	1
13	Romania (ROU)	0	3	1	4
14	Slovenia (SLO)	0	1	0	1
14	Sweden (SWE)	0	1	0	1
16	Slovakia (SVK)*	0	0	2	2
17	Bosnia and Herzegovina (BIH)	0	0	1	1
17	Greece (GRE)	0	0	1	1
17	Iceland (ISL)	0	0	1	1
17	Netherlands (NED)	0	0	1	1
17	Serbia (SRB)	0	0	1	1
17	Switzerland (SUI)	0	0	1	1
Totals (22 entries)		32	32	32	96

== Medalists ==
=== Boys ===
Event	Gold		Silver		Bronze	
50 m freestyle	Davide Passafaro; Italy	23.25	Falémana Lopez; France	23.32	Mykyta Kudinov; Ukraine	23.33
100 m freestyle	Nicholas Castella; Denmark	51.13	Lorenzo Ballarati; Italy	51.38	Zoltán Bagi; Hungary	51.42
200 m freestyle	Filippo Bertoni; Italy	1:49.68	Tolga Temiz; Turkey	1:51.23	Nicholas Castella; Denmark	1:51.49
400 m freestyle	Tolga Temiz; Turkey	3:52.99	Filippo Bertoni; Italy	3:53.02	Arne Schubert; Germany	3:54.21
1500 m freestyle	Filippo Bertoni; Italy	15:21.31	Emir Batur Albayrak; Turkey	15:22.28	Hunor Kovács-Seres; Hungary	15:29.36
100 m backstroke	Aukan Nahuel Goldin; Israel	56.66	Daniele Del Signore; Italy	56.80	Vincent Passek; Germany	56.91
200 m backstroke	Alex Kováts; Hungary	2:02.32	Daniele Del Signore; Italy	2:03.63	Denys Mialkovskyi; Ukraine	2:04.18
100 m breaststroke	Oscar Bilbao; Great Britain	1:04.64	Subajr Biltaev; Germany	1:04.92	Andrea Miron; Italy	1:05.48
200 m breaststroke	Oscar Bilbao; Great Britain	2:18.82	Emilian Hollank; Germany	2:18.86	Collin van der Hoff; Netherlands	2:19.47
100 m butterfly	Ethan Dumesnil; France	54.02	Ivan Harbarchuk; Ukraine	54.62	Stefan Krawiec; Great Britain	54.97
200 m butterfly	Mykola Kotenko; Ukraine	2:00.24	Alessandro Ragaini; Italy	2:02.08	Samuel Košťál; Slovakia	2:02.84
200 m individual medley	Jacopo Barbotti; Italy	2:04.37	Alex Kováts; Hungary	2:04.75	Birnir Freyr Hálfdánarson; Iceland	2:05.33
400 m individual medley	Emanuele Potenza; Italy	4:26.22	Alex Kováts; Hungary	4:29.18	Samuel Košťál; Slovakia	4:29.49
4 × 100 m freestyle relay	Italy; Alessandro Ragaini (51.85); Davide Passafaro (50.72); Lorenzo Ballarati (50.85); Filippo Bertoni (50.72)	3:24.14; EYOF	France; Alexandre Chalendar (51.69); Ethan Dumesnil (51.23); Benjamin Tabutaud (52.36); Falémana Lopez (51.08); Roméo-César Fadda-Sauvageot^{[a]}	3:26.36	Serbia; Justin Cvetkov (52.60); Ognjen Pilipović (52.24); Matija Radenović (52.87); Petar Popović (50.67)	3:28.38
4 × 100 m medley relay	Great Britain; Conor Cherrington (56.95); Oscar Bilbao (1:03.32); Henry Gray (56.71); Stefan Krawiec (50.87); Jake Hutchinson^{[a]}	3:47.85	France; Marko Karadzic (58.42); Sébastien Capogna (1:05.25); Ethan Dumesnil (54.04); Falémana Lopez (50.66); Noah Juge^{[a]} Alexandre Chalendar^{[a]}	3:48.37	Italy; Daniele Del Signore (57.25); Andrea Miron (1:05.61); Alessandro Ragaini (55.83); Lorenzo Ballarati (50.73); Davide Passafaro^{[a]}	3:49.42

^{a} Swimmers who participated in the heats only and received medals.

=== Girls ===
Event	Gold		Silver		Bronze	
50 m freestyle	Jana Pavalić; Croatia	25.61	Skye Carter; Great Britain	25.94	Smiltė Plytnykaitė; Lithuania	26.06
100 m freestyle	Smiltė Plytnykaitė; Lithuania	55.94	Jana Pavalić; Croatia	56.33	Skye Carter; Great Britain	56.66
200 m freestyle	Lucija Lukšić; Croatia	2:01.95	Sylvia Statkevičius; Lithuania	2:03.65	Julia Ackermann; Germany	2:03.69
400 m freestyle	Julia Ackermann; Germany	4:18.54	Valentina Procaccini; Italy	4:20.03	Iman Avdić; Bosnia and Herzegovina	4:20.04 NR
800 m freestyle	Julia Ackermann; Germany	8:48.51	Talya Erdogan; Turkey	8:57.45	Antonia Rakopoulou; Greece	8:58.07
100 m backstroke	Nahia Garrido; Spain	1:02.27	Aissia Prisecariu; Romania	1:02.70	Blythe Kinsman; Great Britain	1:03.38
200 m backstroke	Nahia Garrido; Spain	2:15.01	Aissia Prisecariu; Romania	2:15.95	Dóra Szabó; Hungary	2:16.37
100 m breaststroke	Nayara Pineda; Spain	1:10.91	Lucia Principi; Italy	1:11.43	Havana Cueto Cabrera; Switzerland	1:11.50
200 m breaststroke	Lucia Principi; Italy	2:30.66	Nija Gerdej; Slovenia	2:31.90	Lena Ludwig; Germany	2:33.38
100 m butterfly	Alice Domaggio; Italy	1:00.84	Emmy Hällkvist; Sweden	1:01.15	Martine Damborg; Denmark	1:01.26
200 m butterfly	Alice Domaggio; Italy	2:12.80	Belis Şakar; Turkey	2:15.71	Virág Zámbó; Hungary	2:17.20
200 m individual medley	Phoebe Cooper; Great Britain	2:18.27	Belis Şakar; Turkey	2:19.12	Noelle Benkler; Germany	2:19.14
400 m individual medley	Tamara Elekes; Hungary	4:52.69	Martine Damborg; Denmark	4:54.82	Noelle Benkler; Germany	4:54.94
4 × 100 m freestyle relay	Lithuania; Patricija Geriksonaitė (58.26); Sylvia Statkevičius (58.19); Ieva Visockaitė (58.79); Smiltė Plytnykaitė (56.35); Rusnė Vasiliauskaitė^{[b]}	3:51.59	Great Britain; Pheobe Cooper (56.91); Isla Jones (1:00.25); Skye Carter (56.69); Ella Homan (58.05); Kianna Coertze^{[b]}	3:51.90	Germany; Zara Selimovic (57.92); Julia Ackermann (59.38); Noelle Benkler (58.11); Klara Sophie Beierling (57.14)	3:52.55
4 × 100 m medley relay	Italy; Giulia Buzzi (1:05.54); Lucia Principi (1:10.14); Alice Dimaggio (1:00.90); Sara Paolina Marconi (57.32); Giulia Passi^{[b]}	4:13.90	Spain; Estella Tonrath (1:04.34); Nayara Pineda (1:11.58); Nahia Garrido (1:01.48); Sara Mendoza (57.36)	4:14.76	Romania; Aissia Prisecariu (1:04.16); Brigitta Vass (1:12.62); Eva Paraschiv (1:01.14); Irina Preda (56.89); Ana Sibișeanu^{[b]}	4:14.81

^{b} Swimmers who participated in the heats only and received medals.

=== Mixed ===
Event	Gold		Silver		Bronze	
4 × 100 m freestyle relay	Italy; Alessandro Ragaini (51.86); Davide Passafaro (51.15); Sara Paolina Marconi (57.08); Valentina Procaccini (57.61); Lorenzo Ballarati^{[c]}	3:37.70	Lithuania; Kristupas Trepočka (52.10); Kostas Vaičiūnas (52.71); Smiltė Plytnykaitė (57.07); Patricija Geriksonaitė (56.42)	3:38.30	Germany; Michael Raje (51.92); Simon Reinke (52.66); Zara Selimovic (57.27); Klara Sophie Beierling (56.59)	3:38.44
4 × 100 m medley relay	Germany; Vincent Passek (57.51); Subajr Biltaev (1:04.14); Fee Lukosch (1:02.06); Klara Sophie Beierling (56.74); Emilian Hollank^{[c]} Yara-Fay Riefstahl^{[c]} Zara Selimovic^{[c]}	4:00.45	Romania; Aissia Prisecariu (1:03.31); Darius Coman (1:05.08); Eva Maria Paraschiv (1:01.16); Alexandru Constantinescu (51.17); Robert Badea^{[c]} Irina Preda^{[c]}	4:00.72 NR	Great Britain; Conor Cherrington (57.29); Oscar Bilbabo (1:04.02); Skye Carter (1:02.31); Phoebe Cooper (57.26); Oscar Dodds^{[c]}	4:00.88

^{c} Swimmers who participated in the heats only and received medals.

== Participating nations ==
A total of 332 athletes from 44 nations competed in swimming at the 2022 European Youth Summer Olympic Festival:

- Albania (2)
- Andorra (1)
- Armenia (2)
- Austria (11)
- Azerbaijan (1)
- Belgium (3)
- Bosnia and Herzegovina (2)
- Bulgaria (4)
- Croatia (8)
- Cyprus (2)
- Czech Republic (8)
- Denmark (4)
- Estonia (8)
- Finland (14)
- France (14)
- Georgia (2)
- Germany (15)
- Great Britain (16)
- Greece (8)
- Hungary (16)
- Iceland (5)
- Ireland (2)
- Israel (8)
- Italy (16)
- Kosovo (2)
- Latvia (4)
- Lithuania (12)
- Luxembourg (1)
- Moldova (4)
- Netherlands (5)
- North Macedonia (1)
- Norway (3)
- Poland (16)
- Portugal (8)
- Romania (12)
- San Marino (1)
- Serbia (12)
- Slovakia (16)
- Slovenia (10)
- Spain (16)
- Sweden (4)
- Switzerland (9)
- Turkey (16)
- Ukraine (8)
