= 2025 European Youth Summer Olympic Festival =

- Logo
- Host city: Skopje
- Country: North Macedonia
- Motto: Together, We Shine
- Nations: 49
- Sport: 15 disciplines
- Events: 151
- Opening city: Skopje
- Opening: 20 July 2025
- Closing: 26 July 2025
- Opened by: Gordana Siljanovska-Davkova
- Torch lighter: Dario Ivanovski
- Anthem: “Together We Shine”
- Main venue: Jane Sandanski Arena (opening and closing ceremony)
- Website: https://skopje2025.sporteurope.org/

Summer

Winter

The 2025 European Youth Summer Olympic Festival or simply EYOF 2025, also known as Skopje 2025, was the 18th edition of the European Youth Summer Olympic Festival, held from 20 to 26 July 2025 in Skopje, North Macedonia. Some events (Road cycling, Mountain bike and Basketball) took place in Kumanovo, North Macedonia and Gymnastics in Osijek, Croatia. This is the first time that the festival was held in North Macedonia. It is also the first time that more than one country cooperated to organise the European Youth Olympic Festival. Up until this moment, Skopje 2025 is the largest EYOF ever held in number of sports and athletes.

== Bidding ==
On 26 October 2019, it was announced that the EYOF 2025 should be held in Brno, Czech Republic. But on 31 July 2023, it was announced that the festival would be held in Skopje instead.

== Mascot ==
The mascot is an anthropomorphic sun named "Shiny". The mascot represents warmth, unity, and friendship, and also implies EYOF's values.

== Schedule ==
The competition schedule for the 2025 European Youth Olympic Summer Festival was as follows:

OC	Opening ceremony	1	Event finals	CC	Closing ceremony	●	Event competitions

July	20 Sun	21 Mon	22 Tue	23 Wed	24 Thu	25 Fri	26 Sat	Events
Ceremonies	OC						CC	
Artistic gymnastics			2	2	1	5	5	15
Athletics		7	5	4	2	13	10	41
Badminton		●	●	●	●	●	3	3
Basketball		●	●	●	●	2	2	4
Canoe slalom					4			4
Road cycling			2		2			4
Mountain biking				2				2
Handball		●	●	●		●	2	2
Judo			4	4	4	4	1	17
Shooting		3	3	2	2	2		12
Swimming		2	8	6	5	11		32
Table tennis			●	●	●	●	3	3
Taekwondo				3	3	4		10
Volleyball		●	●	●		●	2	2
Total events		12	24	23	23	41	28	151
Cumulative total		12	36	59	82	123	151	151
July	20 Sun	21 Mon	22 Tue	23 Wed	24 Thu	25 Fri	26 Sat	Events

== Sports ==
The following competitions took place:

2025 European Youth Summer Olympic Festival Sports program
- Artistic gymnastics
- Athletics
- Badminton
- Basketball
- Canoe slalom
- Cycling
- Handball
- Judo
- Shooting
- Swimming
- Table tennis
- Taekwondo
- Volleyball

Compared to 2023, skateboarding and tennis have been removed from the programme. Canoeing has been replaced with canoe slalom, making its EYOF debut. Badminton and table tennis will be present at the event for the first time since 2022 and 2007 respectively. For the first time, there will be events in shooting and taekwondo. For the first time, basketball will be played both in the regular format and the 3×3 format.

== Medal table ==
* Host nation (North Macedonia)

Rank	Nation	Gold	Silver	Bronze	Total
1	Italy	19	19	12	50
2	France	15	18	5	38
3	Spain	10	11	12	33
4	Turkey	10	7	9	26
5	Great Britain	10	7	5	22
6	Poland	10	6	11	27
7	Hungary	10	5	11	26
8	Germany	7	4	12	23
9	Serbia	6	2	6	14
10	Switzerland	5	11	6	22
11	Ukraine	5	8	10	23
12	NOC Belarus	5	4	4	13
13	Belgium	4	3	3	10
14	Greece	3	4	6	13
15	Czech Republic	3	3	8	14
16	Azerbaijan	3	3	4	10
17	Lithuania	3	0	3	6
17	Moldova	3	0	3	6
19	Sweden	2	5	3	10
20	Romania	2	2	8	12
21	Austria	2	2	5	9
22	Norway	2	0	0	2
23	Slovakia	1	5	2	8
24	Croatia	1	3	6	10
25	Slovenia	1	3	3	7
26	Bosnia and Herzegovina	1	2	1	4
26	Latvia	1	2	1	4
26	Netherlands	1	2	1	4
29	Finland	1	2	0	3
30	Portugal	1	1	3	5
31	Bulgaria	1	1	1	3
32	Ireland	1	0	5	6
33	Cyprus	1	0	1	2
33	Iceland	1	0	1	2
35	Estonia	1	0	0	1
36	Georgia	0	3	4	7
37	Israel	0	2	3	5
38	Denmark	0	1	5	6
39	Armenia	0	0	1	1
39	Kosovo	0	0	1	1
Totals (40 entries)		152	151	185	488

Source: https://skopje2025.sporteurope.org/schedule-and-results/

== Participating nations ==
On 20 June 2025 the EOC announced that a Refugee Team would participate in the EYOF. Athletes from Belarus competed as the National Olympic Committee of Belarus. Russian athletes were not permitted to participate due to the ongoing Russian invasion of Ukraine.

Participating National Olympic Committees
- Albania
- Andorra
- Armenia
- Austria
- Azerbaijan
- Belgium
- Bosnia and Herzegovina
- Bulgaria
- Croatia
- Cyprus
- Czech Republic
- Denmark
- EOC Refugee Team
- Estonia (53)
- Finland
- France
- (Georgia (country)) Georgia
- Germany
- (United Kingdom) Great Britain
- Greece
- Hungary
- Iceland
- (Republic of Ireland) Ireland (35)
- Israel
- Italy
- Kosovo
- Latvia
- Liechtenstein
- Lithuania
- Luxembourg
- Malta
- Moldova
- Monaco
- Montenegro
- Netherlands
- North Macedonia
- NOC Belarus
- Norway
- Poland
- Portugal
- Romania
- San Marino
- Serbia
- Slovakia
- Slovenia
- Spain
- Sweden
- Switzerland
- Turkey
- Ukraine

== See also ==
- 2025 European Para Youth Games
