= 2023 European Junior Swimming Championships =

Water sport competitions

- Host city: (Serbia) Belgrade
- Dates: 4-9 July 2023

The 2023 European Junior Swimming Championships were held from 4 to 9 July 2023 in Belgrade, Serbia. The Championships were for girls aged 14–17 and boys age 15–18.

== Results ==
=== Boys ===
Games	Gold		Silver		Bronze	
50 m freestyle	Lorenzo Ballarati; Italy	22.56	Szymon Misiak; Poland	22.75	Davide Passafaro; Italy	22.81
100 m freestyle	Boldizsár Magda; Hungary	49.52	Davide Passafaro; Italy	49.63	Rafael Fente Damers; France	49.72
200 m freestyle	Petar Mitsin; Bulgaria	1:46.50 NR	Alessandro Ragaini; Italy	1:47.76	Jarno Bäschnitt; Germany	1:49.10
400 m freestyle	Petar Mitsin; Bulgaria	3:44.31 WJ, NR	Alessandro Ragaini; Italy	3:48.42	Vlad Stancu; Romania	3:50.21
800 m freestyle	Petar Mitsin; Bulgaria	7:47.45 CR, NR	Vlad Stancu; Romania	7:49.68	Kuzey Tunçelli; Turkey	7:52.39
1500 m freestyle	Kuzey Tunçelli; Turkey	14:58.89 CR	Vlad Stancu; Romania	15:00.51	Emir Batur Albayrak; Turkey	15:00.57
50 m backstroke	Miroslav Knedla; Czech Republic	24.88	Oleksandr Zheltyakov; Ukraine	25.10	Matthew Ward; Great Britain	25.16
100 m backstroke	Oleksandr Zheltyakov; Ukraine	54.18	Christian Bacico; Italy	54.36	Matthew Ward; Great Britain	54.61
200 m backstroke	Oleksandr Zheltyakov; Ukraine	1:55.79 CR	Merlin Ficher; France	1:57.15	Apostolos Siskos; Greece	1:58.37
50 m breaststroke	Jonas Gaur; Denmark	27.57	Uroš Živanović; Serbia	28.08	Emilian Hollank; Germany	28.14
100 m breaststroke	Jonas Gaur; Denmark	1:01.78	Steijn Louter; Netherlands	1:01.94	Uroš Živanović; Serbia	1:02.09
200 m breaststroke	Steijn Louter; Netherlands	2:14.11	Collin van der Hoff; Netherlands	2:15.39	Emilian Hollank; Germany	2:15.98
50 m butterfly	Casper Puggaard; Denmark	23.67	Ethan Dumesnil; France	23.90	Ivan Harbarchuk; Ukraine	24.19
100 m butterfly	Casper Puggaard; Denmark	52.67	Lukas Edl; Austria	53.37	Ethan Dumesnil; France	53.68
200 m butterfly	Andrea Camozzi; Italy	1:58.59	Vlad Stefan Mihalache; Romania	1:58.84	Samuel Kostal; Slovakia	1:59.30
200 m individual medley	Miroslav Knedla; Czech Republic	2:00.26	Christian Mantegazza; Italy	2:01.10	Matthew Ward; Great Britain	2:01.17
400 m individual medley	Emanuele Potenza; Italy	4:21.90	Oleksii Hrabarov; Ukraine	4:22.94	Domenico De Gregorio; Italy	4:23.67
4×100 m freestyle relay	Italy; Carlos D'Ambrosio; Gianluca Messina; Lorenzo Ballarati; Davide Passafaro	3:17.87	France; Rafael Fente Damers; Come Jaegle; Alexandre Chanlendar; Corentin Pouillart	3:19.39	Lithuania; Kristupas Trepočka; Kiril Stepanov; Tajus Juška; Rokas Jazdauskas	3:20.53
4×200 m freestyle relay	Italy; Alessandro Ragaini; Carlos D'Ambrosio; Federico Mao; Filippo Bertoni	7:17.42	France; Come Jaegle; Come Jaegle; Alexandre Chanlendar; Corentin Pouillart; Rafael Fente Damers	7:18.23	Turkey; Tuncer Berk Ertürk; Ahmet Burak Işık; Tolga Temiz; Emir Batur Albayrak	7:21.38
4×100 m medley relay	Italy; Christian Bacico; Christian Mantegazza; Daniele Momoni; Lorenzo Ballarati	3:39.80	Denmark; Mads Moller; Jonas Gaur; Casper Puggaard; Nicholas Castella	3:39.84	France; Merlin Ficher; Henri Bonnault; Ethan Dumesnil; Rafael Fente Damers	3:42.16

=== Girls ===
Games	Gold		Silver		Bronze	
50 m freestyle	Sara Curtis; Italy	25.14	Nina Jazy; Germany	25.38	Skye Carter; Great Britain	25.41
100 m freestyle	Smiltė Plytnykaitė; Lithuania	55.31	Sara Curtis; Italy	55.35	Dóra Molnár; Hungary	55.56
200 m freestyle	Nikolett Pádár; Hungary	1:57.59	Lilla Minna Ábrahám; Hungary	1:59.29	Fleur Verdonck; Belgium	1:59.30
400 m freestyle	Nikolett Pádár; Hungary	4:08.06	Merve Tuncel; Turkey	4:10.44	Maya Werner; Germany	4:12.32
800 m freestyle	Merve Tuncel; Turkey	8:35.10	Marian Ploeger; Germany	8:36.55	Julia Ackermann; Germany	8:36.85
1500 m freestyle	Merve Tuncel; Turkey	16:18.53	Amelie Blocksidge; Great Britain	16:20.19	Marian Ploeger; Germany	16:23.69
50 m backstroke	Lora Komoróczy; Hungary	28.08	Blythe Kinsman; Great Britain	28.41	Daria-Mariuca Silisteanu; Romania	28.46
100 m backstroke	Lora Komoróczy; Hungary	1:01.10	Daria-Mariuca Silisteanu; Romania	1:01.24	Giada Gorlier; Italy	1:01.36
200 m backstroke	Dóra Molnár; Hungary	2:11.06	Holly McGill; Great Britain	2:12.52	Estella Tonrath Nollgen; Spain	2:12.65
50 m breaststroke	Eneli Jefimova; Estonia	30.33	Karolina Piechowicz; Poland	31.18	Olivia Klint Ipsa; Sweden	31.23
100 m breaststroke	Eneli Jefimova; Estonia	1:06.81	Olivia Klint Ipsa; Sweden	1:07.26	Justine Delmas; France	1:08.57
200 m breaststroke	Justine Delmas; France	2:25.62	Eneli Jefimova; Estonia Olivia Klint Ipsa; Sweden	2:26.20	Not awarded	
50 m butterfly	Lana Pudar; Bosnia and Herzegovina	26.10 CR, NR	Martine Damborg; Denmark	26.40	Anna Maria Börstler; Germany	26.55
100 m butterfly	Lana Pudar; Bosnia and Herzegovina	56.95 CR, NR	Martine Damborg; Denmark	58.35	Emmy Hällkvist; Sweden	59.50
200 m butterfly	Lana Pudar; Bosnia and Herzegovina	2:06.26 CR, NR	Alina Baievych; Germany	2:10.78	Glenda Abonyi Tóth; Hungary	2:11.61
200 m individual medley	Leah Schlosshan; Great Britain	2:12.41	Phoebe Cooper; Great Britain	2:13.28	Ellie McCartney; Ireland	2:14.31
400 m individual medley	Vivien Jackl; Hungary	4:40.66	Lisa Nystrand; Sweden	4:45.06	Louna Kasvio; Finland	4:46.82
4×100 m freestyle relay	Italy; Sara Curtis; Cristiana Stevanato; Marina Cacciapuoti; Matilde Biagiotti	3:40.60	Hungary; Lilla Minna Ábrahám; Lili Gyurinovics; Nikolett Pádár; Dóra Molnár	3:41.39	Great Britain; Eva Okaro; Skye Carter; Erin Little; Phoebe Cooper	3:43.37
4×200 m freestyle relay	Hungary; Nikolett Pádár; Lili Gyurinovics; Dóra Molnár; Lilla Minna Ábrahám	8:00.25	Italy; Matilde Biagiotti; Emma Vittoria Giannelli; Giulia Zambelli; Giulia Vetrano	8:03.22	France; Valentine Leclercq; Maeline Bessard; Albane Cachot; Giulia Rossi-Bene	8:05.62
4×100 m medley relay	Italy; Giada Gorlier; Irene Mati; Paola Borrelli; Sara Curtis	4:04.26	France; Manon Domingeon; Justine Delmas; Tabatha Avetand; Albane Cachot	4:05.63	Denmark; Kristine Nilsson Norby; Ida Skov Kragh; Martine Damborg; Schastine Tabor	4:06.13

=== Mixed events ===
Games	Gold		Silver		Bronze	
4×100 m freestyle relay	Hungary; Boldizsár Magda; Dóra Molnár; Mátyás Harsányi; Nikolett Pádár	3:29.75	Italy; Gianluca Messina; Davide Passafaro; Sara Curtis; Cristiana Stevanato	3:30.66	France; Rafael Fente Damers; Albane Cachot; Alexandre Chalendar; Giulia Rossi-Bene	3:30.85
4×100 m medley relay	Denmark; Kristine Nilsson Norby; Casper Puggaard; Jonas Gaur; Martine Damborg	3:50.04	Great Britain; Matthew Ward; Oscar Bilbao; Phoebe Cooper; Skye Carter	3:53.74	Italy; Giada Gorlier; Christian Mantegazza; Daniele Momoni; Matilde Biagiotti	3:53.81

== Medal table ==
* Host nation (Serbia)

Rank	Nation	Gold	Silver	Bronze	Total
1	Italy	9	8	4	21
2	Hungary	9	2	2	13
3	Denmark	5	3	1	9
4	Turkey	3	1	3	7
5	Bosnia and Herzegovina	3	0	0	3
5	Bulgaria	3	0	0	3
7	Ukraine	2	2	1	5
8	Estonia	2	1	0	3
9	Czech Republic	2	0	0	2
10	France	1	5	6	12
11	Great Britain	1	5	5	11
12	Netherlands	1	2	0	3
13	Lithuania	1	0	1	2
14	Romania	0	4	2	6
15	Germany	0	3	7	10
16	Sweden	0	3	2	5
17	Poland	0	2	0	2
18	Serbia	0	1	1	2
19	Austria	0	1	0	1
20	Belgium	0	0	1	1
20	Finland	0	0	1	1
20	Greece	0	0	1	1
20	Ireland	0	0	1	1
20	Slovakia	0	0	1	1
20	Spain	0	0	1	1
Totals (25 entries)		42	43	41	126
