= Basketball at the 2022 European Youth Summer Olympic Festival =

- Venue: Badin Basketball Hall; University Basketball Hall
- Date: 25–30 July 2022
- Competitors: 192 from 12 nations

Basketball at the 2022 European Youth Summer Olympic Festival was held at the Badin Basketball Hall in Badín, Slovakia and University Basketball Hall in Banská Bystrica, Slovakia from 25 to 30 July 2022.

== Medalists ==
Event	Gold	Silver	Bronze
Boys	France (FRA)	Lithuania (LIT)	Germany (GER)
Girls	France (FRA)	Spain (SPA)	Hungary (HUN)

== Participating nations ==
A total of 192 athletes from 12 nations competed in basketball at the 2022 European Youth Summer Olympic Festival:

- Belgium (12)
- Croatia (12)
- Spain (12)
- Finland (12)
- France (24)
- Germany (24)
- Hungary (12)
- Lithuania (12)
- Slovenia (24)
- Serbia (12)
- Slovakia (24)
- Turkey (12)
