= Athletics at the 2022 European Youth Summer Olympic Festival =

- Venue: SNP Stadium
- Date: 25–30 July
- Competitors: 507 from 43 nations

Athletics at the 2022 European Youth Summer Olympic Festival was held at the SNP Stadium in Banská Bystrica, Slovakia, from 25 to 30 July 2022.

== Medal table ==
* Host nation (Slovakia)

Rank	Nation	Gold	Silver	Bronze	Total
1	Poland (POL)	4	3	4	11
2	Italy (ITA)	4	2	5	11
3	Spain (ESP)	4	2	4	10
4	Hungary (HUN)	3	5	3	11
5	Croatia (CRO)	3	3	0	6
5	France (FRA)	3	3	0	6
7	Sweden (SWE)	3	2	0	5
8	Czech Republic (CZE)	2	4	5	11
9	Germany (GER)	2	1	1	4
9	Turkey (TUR)	2	1	1	4
11	Greece (GRE)	2	1	0	3
12	Romania (ROU)	1	3	3	7
13	Finland (FIN)	1	1	2	4
14	Lithuania (LTU)	1	1	0	2
14	Serbia (SRB)	1	1	0	2
16	Belgium (BEL)	1	0	0	1
16	Israel (ISR)	1	0	0	1
16	Switzerland (SUI)	1	0	0	1
16	Ukraine (UKR)	1	0	0	1
20	Estonia (EST)	0	3	0	3
21	Portugal (POR)	0	1	2	3
22	Latvia (LAT)	0	1	1	2
22	Slovakia (SVK)*	0	1	1	2
24	Cyprus (CYP)	0	1	0	1
24	Slovenia (SLO)	0	1	0	1
26	Bulgaria (BUL)	0	0	3	3
27	Moldova (MDA)	0	0	2	2
28	Ireland (IRL)	0	0	1	1
28	Malta (MLT)	0	0	1	1
Totals (29 entries)		40	41	39	120

== Medalists ==
=== Boys ===
==== Track ====
Event	Gold		Silver		Bronze	
100 m	Zalán Deák; Hungary	10.59; PB	Ylann Bizasene; France	10.72 =PB	Daniel Casado; Spain	10.77 =PB
200 m	William Trulsson; Sweden	21.07	Danielus Vasiliauskas; Lithuania	21.56; PB	Radosław Lach; Poland	21.61
400 m	Noam Mamu; Israel	47.60; PB	Fabián Vidal; Spain	48.66	Matthew Galea Soler; Malta	48.84; PB
800 m	Yanis Vanlanduyt; France	1:56.96	Žan Ogrinc; Slovenia	1:57.98	Nuno Cordeiro; Portugal	1:58.57
1500 m	Latena Cervone; Italy	4:02.30	Albert Szirbek; Hungary	4:02.69	Seán Cronin; Ireland	4:02.81
3000 m	Karl Ottfalk; Sweden	8:23.80	Lucian Ștefan; Romania	8:28.13; PB	Vittore Simone Borromini; Italy	8:28.55; PB
110 m hurdles	Matyáš Zach; Czech Republic	13.60	Janko Kišak; Croatia	13.74; PB	Iker Moreno; Spain	13.77; PB
400 m hurdles	Wassim Taouil; France	52.93; PB	Samuel Jönsson; Sweden	52.95; PB	Kacper Uliński; Poland	53.76; PB
2000 m steeplechase	Mario Palencia; Spain	5:46.94; PB	Jan Škarban; Czech Republic	5:47.96; PB	Alin Șavlovschi; Romania	5:50.91; PB
Medley relay	Poland; Tomasz Bajraszewski; Radosław Lach; Rafał Dziewięcki; Jakub Szarapo	1:53.70	Hungary; Ádám Trenka; Zalán Deák; Dániel Alexovics; Péter Fodor	1:55.43	Spain; Iker Moreno; Daniel Casado; Íñigo Alfonso Burguete; Fabián Vidal	1:55.80
5000 m walk	Daniel Monfort; Spain	21:22.02; PB	Nick Joel Richardt; Germany	22:02.70; PB	Matteo Arisi; Italy	22:02.71; PB

==== Field ====
Event	Gold		Silver		Bronze	
High jump	Sebastian Antosiak; Poland	2.06	Elijah Pasquier; France	2.04	Bubacar Júnior; Portugal	1.98; PB
Pole vault	Ylio Philtjens; Belgium	4.95; PB	Pavlos Kriaras; Greece	4.90; PB	None awarded	
Pole vault	Ylio Philtjens; Belgium	4.95; PB	Karl Kristjan Pohlak; Estonia	4.90; PB	None awarded	
Long jump	Petr Meindlschmid; Czech Republic	7.29 = PB	Cristian Popescu; Romania	7.25; PB	Nicholas Gavagni; Italy	6.73
Triple jump	Ioannis Gkartsios; Greece	15.19; PB	Antranik Sarkis Ashdjian; Cyprus	14.66; PB	Bojan Hadjitodorof; Bulgaria	14.59
Shot put (5 kg)	Arnau Llorens; Spain	16.67	Marco Nardocci; Italy	16.55	Denis Cutcovețchi; Moldova	15.93; PB
Discus throw (1,5 kg)	Mihai Motorca; Romania	57.12	Zsombor Dobó; Hungary	56.65	Mico Lampinen; Finland	56.59
Hammer throw (5 kg)	Ármin Szabados; Hungary	72.64	Mico Lampinen; Finland	69.40; PB	Ilia Ciui; Moldova	69.33
Javelin throw	Roch Krukowski; Poland	74.63; PB	Attila Herczeg; Hungary	69.46; PB	Štěpán Šípek; Czech Republic	66.63

==== Combined ====
Event	Gold		Silver		Bronze	
Decathlon	Alvar Nik Adler; Germany	6977	Atvars Ernests Paļulis; Latvia	6790	Milan Vích; Czech Republic	6604

=== Girls ===
==== Track ====
Event	Gold		Silver		Bronze	
100 m	Alice Pagliarini; Italy	11.69	Vita Penezić; Croatia	11.81; PB	Ester Parohová; Czech Republic	11.87
200 m	Lara Jurčić; Croatia	24.05; PB	Maria Jarosińska; Poland	24.30	Elisa Marcello; Italy	24.33
400 m	Edanur Tulum; Turkey	54.41	Lenka Gymerská; Slovakia	55.23; PB	Maria Capotă; Romania	55.33; PB
800 m	Maša Rajić; Serbia	2:11.95	Lorenza De Noni; Italy	2.12.49	Oliwia Bełczew; Poland	2:12.51
1500 m	Ayça Fidanoğlu; Turkey	4:21.25	Zuzana Wiernicka; Poland	4:23.17	Austra Ošiņa; Latvia	4:25.11; PB
3000 m	Viola Paoletti; Italy	9:25.34; PB	Edibe Yağız; Turkey	9:25.83; PB	Carla Moreno; Spain	9:32.07; PB
100 m hurdles	Mia Wild; Croatia	13.46; PB	Esther Sahlqvist; Sweden	13.56	Sofia Pizzato; Italy	13.62
400 m hurdles	Olha Mashanienkova; Ukraine	59.49; PB	Alexandra Uță; Romania	59.65	Amelia Zochniak; Poland	59.91; PB
2000 m steeplechase	Greta Guerrero; Spain	6:43.52; PB	Karolína Jarošová; Czech Republic	6:47.62; PB	Ceren Kılıç; Turkey	6:51.32; PB
Medley relay	Italy; Alice Pagliarini; Sofia Pizzato; Valentina Vaccari; Elisa Marcello	2:11.27	Poland; Maja Woźniak; Maria Jarosińska; Anastazja Kuś; Julia Przewieźlik	2:11.30	Hungary; Petra Lalik; Bori Rózsahegyi; Angéla Ecser; Sarolta Kriszt	2:11.59
5000 m walk	Léna Auvray; France	22:55.52; PB	Aldara Meilán; Spain	22:55.58; PB	Alexandra Kovács; Hungary	23:17.79; PB

==== Field ====
Event	Gold		Silver		Bronze	
High jump	Jana Koščak; Croatia	1.84	Nikolina Pejatović; Serbia	1.82; PB	Iren Saraboyukova; Bulgaria	1.80; PB
Pole vault	Evgenia-Maria Panagiotou; Greece	3.95; PB	Emma Mészáros; Hungary	3.95; PB	Anna Šimková; Slovakia	3.80
Long jump	Bori Rózsahegyi; Hungary	6.16	Anna Ćurković; Croatia	5.99	Viktorie Jánská; Czech Republic	5.73
Triple jump	Aurėja Beniušytė; Lithuania	13.04; PB	Tatiana Pereira; Portugal	12.51; PB	Elena Argirova; Bulgaria	12.44; PB
Shot put (3 kg)	Julia Michalowska; Poland	16.23	Karolína Machová; Czech Republic	15.87; PB	Carmen Welling; Finland	15.63; PB
Discus throw (1 kg)	Frieda Roberta Echterhoff; Germany	43.24	Natálie Fišerová; Czech Republic	40.99	Ana Visan; Romania	39.47
Hammer throw (3 kg)	Patricia Kamga; Sweden	65.92; PB	Marie Rougetet; France	61.95; PB	Zuzana Štejfová; Czech Republic	61.53; PB
Javelin throw	Rebecca Nelimarkka; Finland	51.69; PB	Heti Väät; Estonia	49.95	Gréta Illyés; Hungary	49.03; PB

==== Combined ====
Event	Gold		Silver		Bronze	
Heptathlon	Lucia Acklin; Switzerland	5416	Viola Hambidge; Estonia	5383	Maresa Hense; Germany	5246

== Participating nations ==
A total of 507 athletes from 43 nations competed in athletics at the 2022 European Youth Summer Olympic Festival:

- Albania (1)
- Andorra (2)
- Armenia (2)
- Austria (12)
- Azerbaijan (6)
- Belgium (5)
- Bosnia and Herzegovina (2)
- Bulgaria (6)
- Croatia (10)
- Cyprus (10)
- Czech Republic (27)
- (International Olympic Committee) EOC Refugee Team (1)
- Estonia (16)
- Finland (12)
- France (28)
- Georgia (4)
- Germany (17)
- Greece (16)
- Hungary (26)
- Iceland (4)
- Ireland (16)
- Israel (10)
- Italy (28)
- Kosovo (3)
- Latvia (12)
- Lithuania (12)
- Luxembourg (3)
- Malta (2)
- Moldova (4)
- Monaco (2)
- Montenegro (1)
- North Macedonia (1)
- Poland (28)
- Portugal (16)
- Romania (27)
- San Marino (2)
- Serbia (12)
- Slovakia (28)
- Slovenia (13)
- Spain (24)
- Sweden (9)
- Switzerland (5)
- Turkey (28)
- Ukraine (14)
