= Shooting at the 2025 European Youth Summer Olympic Festival =

- Location: Skopje, North Macedonia
- Date: 24-25 July 2025

Shooting at the 2025 European Youth Summer Olympic Festival will be held 24-25 July 2025.

== Medal table ==
* Host nation (North Macedonia)

| Rank | Nation | Gold | Silver | Bronze | Total |
|---|---|---|---|---|---|
| 1 | Moldova | 3 | 0 | 0 | 3 |
| – | NOC Belarus | 2 | 1 | 2 | 5 |
| 2 | Turkey | 2 | 0 | 1 | 3 |
| 3 | Serbia | 1 | 2 | 1 | 4 |
| 4 | Spain | 1 | 1 | 1 | 3 |
| 5 | Hungary | 1 | 1 | 0 | 2 |
| 6 | Croatia | 1 | 0 | 0 | 1 |
| 6 | Germany | 1 | 0 | 0 | 1 |
| 8 | Slovenia | 0 | 2 | 0 | 2 |
| 9 | Ukraine | 0 | 1 | 1 | 2 |
| 10 | Azerbaijan | 0 | 1 | 0 | 1 |
| 10 | Bosnia and Herzegovina | 0 | 1 | 0 | 1 |
| 10 | Bulgaria | 0 | 1 | 0 | 1 |
| 10 | Latvia | 0 | 1 | 0 | 1 |
| 14 | Italy | 0 | 0 | 2 | 2 |
| 15 | Austria | 0 | 0 | 1 | 1 |
| 15 | Czech Republic | 0 | 0 | 1 | 1 |
| 15 | Greece | 0 | 0 | 1 | 1 |
| 15 | Switzerland | 0 | 0 | 1 | 1 |
| Totals (18 entries) | | 12 | 12 | 12 | 36 |

== Medalists ==
=== Boys ===
| Event | Gold | Silver | Bronze |
|---|---|---|---|
| 10 m Air Pistol | Climentii Ursu; Moldova | Uroš Gajić; Serbia | Loris Quarta; Italy |
| 10 m Air Rifle | Ákos Márta; Hungary | Maksimilijan Žarić; Slovenia | Arseni Livantsou; NOC Belarus |
| 10 m Air Pistol Individual | Climentii Ursu; Moldova | Damyan Iliev; Bulgaria | Yury Krautsou; NOC Belarus |
| 10 m Air Rifle Individual | Toma Tadić; Croatia | Amir Memišević; Bosnia and Herzegovina | Konstantinos Sovolos; Greece |

=== Girls ===
| Event | Gold | Silver | Bronze |
|---|---|---|---|
| 10 m Air Pistol | Ezginur Türkmen; Turkey | Alina Nestsiarovich; NOC Belarus | Gloria Sanchez; Spain |
| 10 m Air Rifle | Elif Berfin Altun; Turkey | Anastasija Živković; Serbia | Mia Grosch; Austria |
| 10 m Air Pistol Individual | Alina Nestsiarovich; NOC Belarus | Gloria Sanchez; Spain | Aneta Marečková; Czech Republic |
| 10 m Air Rifle Individual | Theresa Luise Schnell; Germany | Anete Tukiša; Latvia | Elif Berfin Altun; Turkey |

=== Mixed ===
| Event | Gold | Silver | Bronze |
|---|---|---|---|
| 10 m Air Pistol Pair | Spain; Gloria Sanchez; Juan Miguel Robles | Ukraine; Yuliia Isachenko; Ilya Lashch | Italy; Alice Bruno; Loris Quarta |
| 10 m Air Rifle Pair | Serbia; Anastasija Živković; Stefan Agović | Slovenia; Lana Kužnik; Maksimilijan Zaric | Switzerland; Emely Jaeggi; Dorian Saillen |
| 10 m Air Pistol Pair Hit/Miss | Moldova; Alexandra Homutova; Climentii Ursu | Azerbaijan; Leyli Aliyeva; Oleg Kerzhankin | Ukraine; Yuliia Isachenko; Ilya Lashch |
| 10 m Air Rifle Pair Hit/Miss | NOC Belarus; Darya Chuprys; Arseni Livantsou | Hungary; Csilla Ferik; Ákos Márta | Serbia; Anastasija Živković; Stefan Agović |
