= Cycling at the 2025 European Youth Summer Olympic Festival =

- Venue: Kumanovo, North Macedonia
- Date: 22–24 July 2025

Cycling at the 2025 European Youth Summer Olympic Festival will be held in Kumanovo, North Macedonia, from 22 to 24 July 2025.

== Medal table ==
* Host nation (North Macedonia)

Rank	Nation	Gold	Silver	Bronze	Total
1	Switzerland	2	0	0	2
2	Belgium	1	2	0	3
3	Italy	1	0	1	2
4	Austria	1	0	0	1
4	Slovakia	1	0	0	1
6	France	0	2	0	2
7	Poland	0	1	1	2
8	Sweden	0	1	0	1
9	Great Britain	0	0	2	2
10	Germany	0	0	1	1
10	Slovenia	0	0	1	1
Totals (11 entries)		6	6	6	18

== Medalists ==
=== Boys ===
Event	Gold	Silver	Bronze
Individual time trial	Yanis Berthoud; Switzerland	Sander Willems; Belgium	Tommaso Cingolani; Italy
Road race	Niklas Weismayr; Austria	Lanyan Clovis; France	Daniel Davies; Great Britain
Mountain bike cross-country	Lars Peers; Belgium	Lucas Rodriguez; France	Lenart Dejak; Slovenia

=== Girls ===
Event	Gold	Silver	Bronze
Individual time trial	Karolína Hajduková; Slovakia	Magdalena Polańska; Poland	Edda Bieberle; Germany
Road race	Anna Bonassi; Italy	Anna Meeusen; Belgium	Melanie Rowe; Great Britain
Mountain bike cross-country	Yaelle Klauser; Switzerland	Lilly Temar; Sweden	Natalia Pirog; Poland
