= Národný Atletický Štadión =

Football stadium in Banská Bystrica, Slovakia

Národný atletický štadión
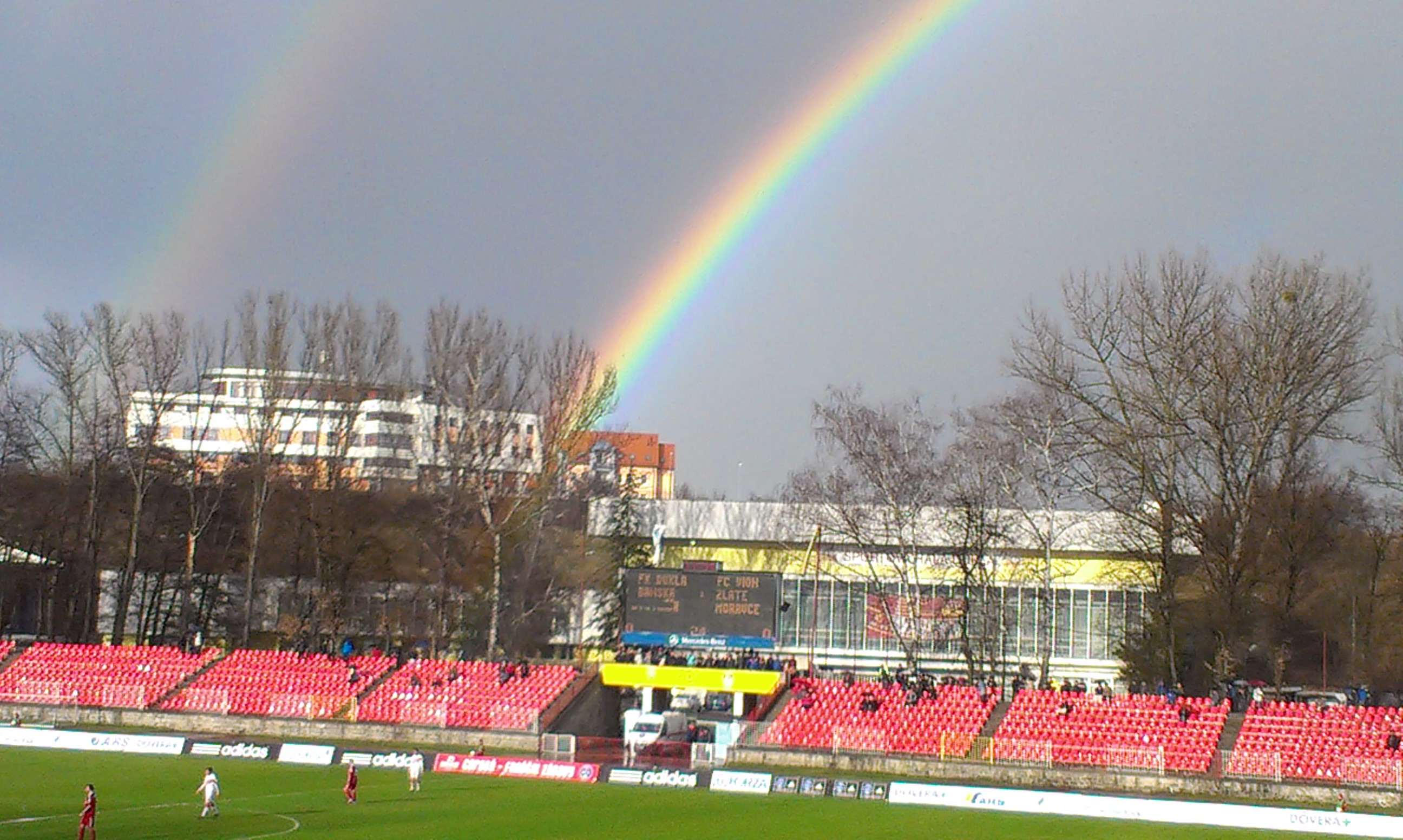
- UEFA
- Interactive map of Národný atletický štadión
- Former names: Štadión SNP Štiavničky (1959-2021)
- Location: Hutná 3, Banská Bystrica, Slovakia
- Coordinates: 48°43′55.01″N 19°07′53.41″E
- Owner: Ministry of Defence SR
- Operator: VŠC Dukla Banská Bystrica
- Capacity: 7,381
- Surface: Grass
- Record attendance: 14,000 (Dukla vs. Mönchengladbach , 18 September 1984)

Construction
- Opened: 22 August 1959
- Renovated: 2019-2021
- Cost: €14.1 million (2019–2021)

Tenant
- FK Dukla Banská Bystrica (1965–2019, 2021–present)

The Národný atletický štadión (National athletics stadium) is a multi-purpose stadium in Banská Bystrica, Slovakia. It is currently used mostly for athletics and football matches and serves as the home ground of MFK Dukla Banská Bystrica. The stadium has a seating capacity of 7,381.

== History ==
Construction of this centrally located stadium in the Štiavničky part of Banská Bystrica commenced in 1957 and lasted two years. The stadium opened on 22 August 1959, the 15th anniversary of the Slovak National Uprising (Slovak: Slovenské národné povstanie, SNP) under the name of Štadión SNP with a capacity of almost 15,000 spectators.

Motorcycle speedway was held around the football pitch on the site from 1959 to 1966 and hosted a final round of the Czechoslovak Individual Speedway Championship in 1959 and 1960.

=== 2019 reconstruction ===
In 2019 reconstruction work began on the stadium to meet IAAF standards and UEFA 3-star criteria. Tenants FK Dukla Banská Bystrica played their last match on 5 October 2019, drawing 3–3 with Dubnica nad Váhom before the construction started. The original capacity was decreased to 7,381 spectators (all-seated). The estimated cost of €14.1 million was paid for by the Slovak government. The stadium re-opened after construction work in October 2021, newly featuring under-soil heating, a grandstand, and an adjacent training stadium. The stadium is owned by Ministry of Defence Slovak Republic.

== Non-football events ==
Národný atletický štadión hosted athletics at the 2022 European Youth Summer Olympic Festival, from 25 to 30 July 2022. In July 2024 the stadium hosted the 2024 European Athletics U18 Championships over a four-day period.
