= Ivan Harbarchuk =

Ukrainian swimmer (born 2006)

Personal information
- Native name: Іван Гарбарчук
- Born: 11 May 2006 (age 20) Lutsk, Ukraine

Sport
- Sport: Swimming
Medal record
Men's swimming
Representing Ukraine
European Junior Championships
Bronze medal – third place	2023 Belgrade	50 m butterfly
European Youth Summer Olympic Festival
Silver medal – second place	2022 Banská Bystrica	100 m butterfly

Ivan Harbarchuk (Ukrainian: Іван Гарбарчук, born 11 May 2006 in Lutsk) is a Ukrainian swimmer. He is 2022 European Youth Summer Olympic Festival silver medalist in 100 m butterfly event, and 2023 European Junior Swimming Championships bronze medalist in 50 m butterfly event.
