= Volleyball at the 2022 European Youth Summer Olympic Festival =

- Venue: Volleyball Hall Slovenská Ľupča; Volleyball Hall Zvolen
- Date: 25–30 July 2022
- Competitors: 192 from 11 nations

Volleyball at the 2022 European Youth Summer Olympic Festival was held at the Volleyball Hall Slovenská Ľupča in Slovenská Ľupča, Slovakia and Volleyball Hall Zvolen in Zvolen, Slovakia from 25 to 30 July 2022.

== Medalists ==
Event	Gold	Silver	Bronze
Boys	Italy (ITA)	Bulgaria (BUL)	Czech Republic (CZE)
Girls	Italy (ITA)	Turkey (TUR)	Poland (POL)

== Participating nations ==
A total of 192 athletes from 11 nations competed in volleyball at the 2022 European Youth Summer Olympic Festival:

- Belgium (12)
- Bulgaria (24)
- Czech Republic (12)
- Germany (12)
- Italy (24)
- Poland (24)
- Romania (12)
- Slovenia (12)
- Serbia (12)
- Slovakia (24)
- Turkey (24)
