= EOC Refugee Team at the European Youth Olympic Festival =

- IOC code: ERT
- NOC: European Olympic Committees
- Medals: Gold 0 Silver 0 Bronze 0 Total 0

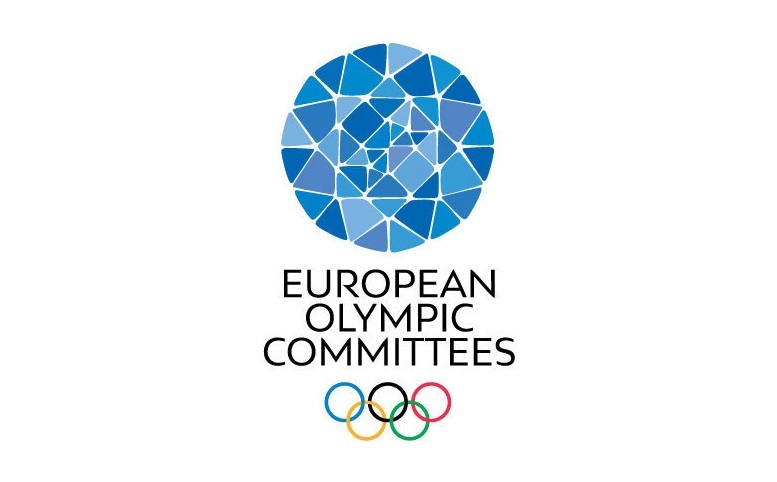
Flag used by EOC Refugee Team

The EOC Refugee Team has participated at the European Youth Olympic Festival summer editions in 2019, 2022 and 2023. The team competes under the flag of the European Olympic Committees and uses the code “ERT”.

== 2019 European Youth Summer Olympic Festival ==
Athletes

One refugee athlete competed at the 2019 European Youth Summer Olympic Festival in Baku, Azerbaijan.

Athlete	Country of origin	Host NOC	Sport	Event
Nazret Kobodom	Eritrea	Israel	Athletics	Girls 3000m

== 2022 European Youth Summer Olympic Festival ==
Athletes

One refugee athlete competed at the 2022 European Youth Summer Olympic Festival in Banská Bystrica, Slovakia.

Athlete	Country of origin	Host NOC	Sport	Event
Molham Hawana	Syria	Austria	Athletics	Boys javelin

Results

Javelin throw

Rank	Name	Nationality	Round						Mark	Notes
Rank	Name	Nationality	1	2	3	4	5	6	Mark	Notes
7	Molham Hawana	EOC Refugee Team	56.87	x	x	55.02	54.18	51.76	56.87	

== 2023 European Youth Summer Olympic Festival ==
Athletes

One refugee athlete competed at the 2023 European Youth Summer Olympic Festival in Maribor, Slovenia.

Athlete	Country of origin	Host NOC	Sport	Event
S. Baba Swaray		Cyprus	Athletics	Boys 800m

== 2025 European Youth Summer Olympic Festival ==
On 20 June 2025 the EOC announced that a Refugee Team would participate in the 2025 European Youth Summer Olympic Festival in Skopje, North Macedonia.

Athletes

Athlete	Country of origin	Host NOC	Sport	Event
Tahora Ismaili	Afghanistan	Switzerland	Taekwondo	

== Medals ==
=== Medals by Summer Youth Olympic Festival ===
Games	Athletes	Gold	Silver	Bronze	Total	Rank
(Azerbaijan) 2019 Baku	1	0	0	0	0	-
(Slovakia) 2022 Banská Bystrica	1	0	0	0	0	-
(Slovenia) 2023 Maribor	1	0	0	0	0	-
(North Macedonia) 2025 Skopje	1	0	0	0	0	-
Total		0	0	0	0	-

== See also ==
- Refugee Olympic Team at the Olympics
- EOC Refugee Team at the European Games
