= Alessandro Ragaini =

Italian swimmer (born 2006)

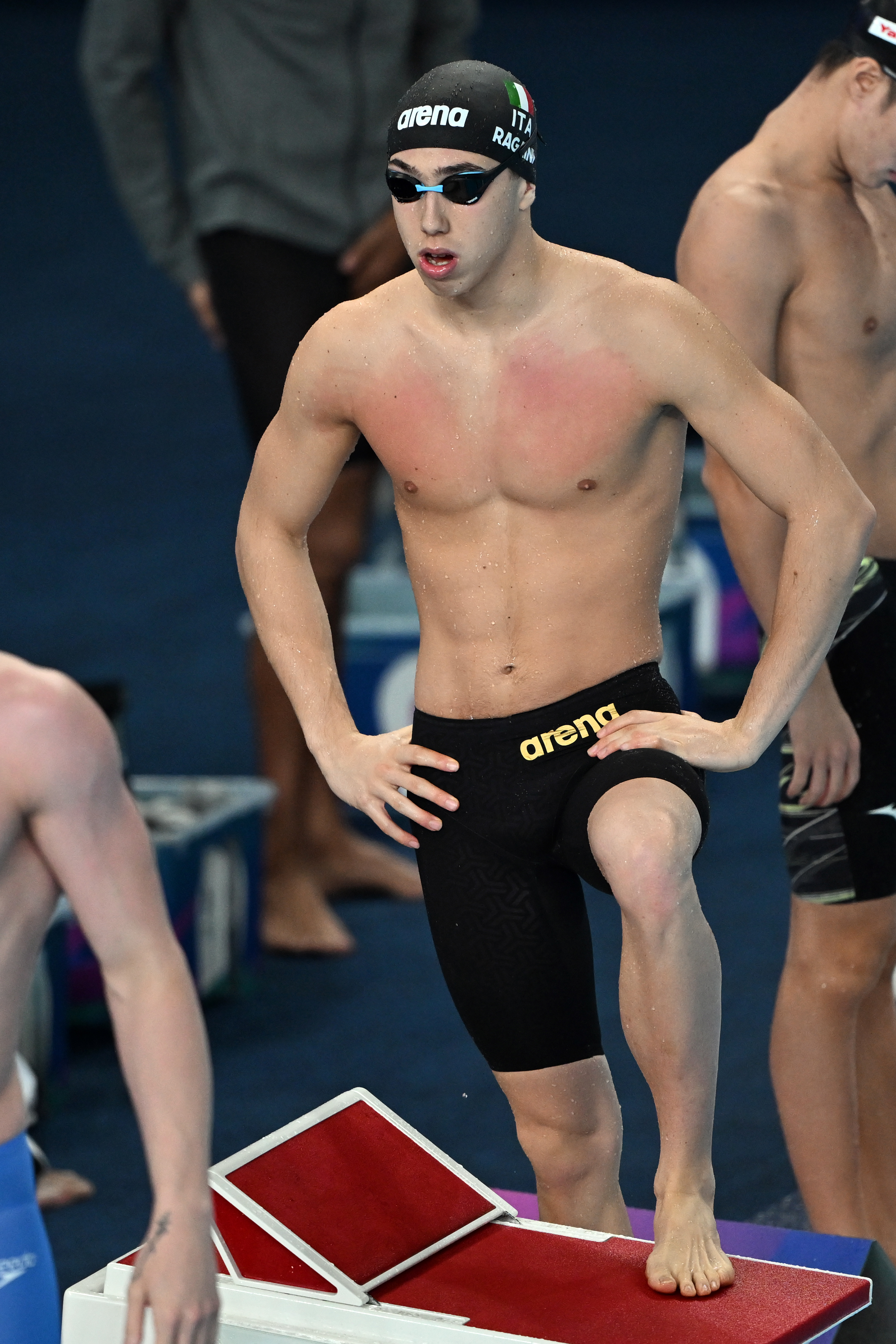

Personal information
- Nationality: Italian
- Born: 2 August 2006 (age 20) Jesi, Italy
- Height: 1.85 m (6 ft 1 in)

Sport
- Sport: Swimming
- Club: CS Carabinieri / SSD Team Marche
Medal record
Men's swimming
Representing Italy
World Championships (SC)
Bronze medal – third place	2024 Budapest	4×200 m freestyle
Mediterranean Games
Silver medal – second place	2026 Taranto	400 m freestyle
European Junior Championships
Gold medal – first place	2023 Belgrade	4x200 m freestyle
Gold medal – first place	2024 Vilnius	400 m freestyle
Gold medal – first place	2024 Vilnius	4x200 m freestyle
Silver medal – second place	2023 Belgrade	200 m freestyle
Silver medal – second place	2023 Belgrade	400 m freestyle
European Youth Olympic Festival
Gold medal – first place	2022 Banská Bystrica	4x100 m freestyle
Gold medal – first place	2022 Banská Bystrica	4x100 m mixed freestyle
Silver medal – second place	2022 Banská Bystrica	200 m butterfly
Bronze medal – third place	2022 Banská Bystrica	4x100 m medley

Alessandro Ragaini (born 2 August 2006) is an Italian competitive swimmer. He represented Italy at the 2024 Summer Olympics.
