= Oleksii Hrabarov =

Ukrainian swimmer (born 2005)

Personal information
- Native name: Олексій Грабаров
- Born: 15 May 2005 (age 21) Odesa, Ukraine

Sport
- Sport: Swimming
- Strokes: Medley
- Club: Dynamo Odesa
Medal record
Men's swimming
Representing Ukraine
European Junior Championships
Silver medal – second place	2023 Belgrade	400 m individual medley

Oleksii Hrabarov (Ukrainian: Олексій Грабаров, born 15 May 2005 in Odesa) is a Ukrainian swimmer. He is 2023 European Junior Swimming Championships silver medalist in 400 m individual medley event.
