= Badminton at the 2022 European Youth Summer Olympic Festival =

Badminton at the 2022 European Youth Summer Olympics Festival
- Venue: Sports Park Badminton
- Dates: 25–30 July
- Competitors: 73 from 37 nations

Badminton at the 2022 European Youth Summer Olympic Festival was held from 25 to 30 July. The events took place at the Sports Park Badminton in Banská Bystrica, Slovakia.

== Start list ==
73 players from 37 countries competing badminton event.

NOC	Boys' singles	Girls' singles	Mixed doubles	Players	Entries
Albania	X	X	X	2	3
Armenia	X	X	X	2	3
Austria	X	X	X	2	3
Azerbaijan	X	X	X	2	3
Belgium	X	X	X	2	3
Croatia	X	X	X	2	3
Cyprus	X	X	X	2	3
Czech Republic	X	X	X	2	3
Denmark	X	X	X	2	3
Estonia	X	X	X	2	3
Finland		X		1	2
Georgia	X	X	X	2	3
Germany	X	X	X	2	3
Great Britain	X	X	X	2	3
Greece	X	X	X	2	3
Hungary	X	X	X	2	3
Iceland	X	X	X	2	3
Ireland	X	X	X	2	3
Israel	X	X	X	2	3
Italy	X	X	X	2	3
Kosovo	X	X	X	2	3
Latvia	X	X	X	2	3
Lithuania	X	X	X	2	3
Luxembourg	X	X	X	2	3
Moldova	X	X	X	2	3
Netherlands	X	X	X	2	3
Norway	X	X	X	2	3
Poland	X	X	X	2	3
Portugal	X	X	X	2	3
Serbia	X	X	X	2	3
Slovakia	X	X	X	2	3
Slovenia	X	X	X	2	3
Spain	X	X	X	2	3
Sweden	X	X	X	2	3
Switzerland	X	X	X	2	3
Turkey	X	X	X	2	3
Ukraine	X	X	X	2	3
Total: 37 NOCs	36	37	36	73	109

== Medalists ==
=== Medal table ===
* Host nation (Slovakia)

Rank	Nation	Gold	Silver	Bronze	Total
1	Turkey	1	1	0	2
2	Denmark	1	0	2	3
3	Finland	1	0	0	1
4	Poland	0	1	1	2
5	Sweden	0	1	0	1
6	Austria	0	0	1	1
6	Germany	0	0	1	1
6	Lithuania	0	0	1	1
Totals (8 entries)		3	3	6	12

=== Medalists ===
Event	Gold	Silver	Bronze
Boys' singles	Salomon Thomasen; Denmark	Romeo Makboul; Sweden	Mateusz Gołaś; Poland
Boys' singles	Salomon Thomasen; Denmark	Romeo Makboul; Sweden	Pascal Lin Cheng; Austria
Girls' singles	Nella Nyqvist; Finland	Ravza Bodur; Turkey	Maria Tommerup; Denmark
Girls' singles	Nella Nyqvist; Finland	Ravza Bodur; Turkey	Viltė Paulauskaitė; Lithuania
Mixed doubles	Ravza Bodur; Bugra Atkas; Turkey	Mateusz Golas; Maja Janko; Poland	Salomon Thomasen; Maria Tommerup; Denmark
Mixed doubles	Ravza Bodur; Bugra Atkas; Turkey	Mateusz Golas; Maja Janko; Poland	Luis Pongratz; Marie Stern; Germany

== Boys' singles ==
=== Seeds ===
1. (Poland) Mateusz Gołaś (bronze medalist)
2. (Austria) Pascal Lin Cheng (bronze medalist)
3. (Croatia) Roko Pipunić (group stage)
4. (Sweden) Romeo Makboul (silver medalist)
5. (United Kingdom) Harper Leigh (round of 16)
6. (Germany) Luis Pongratz (quarter-finals)
7. (Luxembourg) Noah Warning (quarter-finals)
8. (Belgium) Arnaud Huberty (round of 16)

=== Group 1 ===
Pos	Team	Pld	W	L	GF	GA	GD	PF	PA	PD	Pts	Qualification
1	(Poland) Mateusz Gołaś	3	3	0	6	0	+6	126	42	+84	3	Advance to round of 16
2	(Cyprus) Nikolaos Kokosis	3	2	1	4	2	+2	112	75	+37	2	Advance to round of 16
3	(Georgia (country)) Giorgi Mzhavia	3	1	2	2	4	−2	73	102	−29	1	
4	(Albania) Gjergji Pili	3	0	3	0	6	−6	34	126	−92	0	

Source: TS

Date	Time	Player 1	Score	Player 2	Set 1	Set 2	Set 3
25 July	9:50	Mateusz Gołaś (Poland)	2–0	(Albania) Gjergji Pili	21–2	21–0	
25 July	10:15	Nikolaos Kokosis (Cyprus)	2–0	(Georgia (country)) Giorgi Mzhavia	21–9	21–10	
25 July	14:30	Mateusz Gołaś (Poland)	2–0	(Georgia (country)) Giorgi Mzhavia	21–7	21–5	
25 July	14:30	Nikolaos Kokosis (Cyprus)	2–0	(Albania) Gjergji Pili	21–8	21–6	
26 July	11:30	Mateusz Gołaś (Poland)	2–0	(Cyprus) Nikolaos Kokosis	21–14	21–14	
26 July	11:30	Giorgi Mzhavia (Georgia (country))	2–0	(Albania) Gjergji Pili	21–10	21–8	

=== Group 2 ===
Pos	Team	Pld	W	L	GF	GA	GD	PF	PA	PD	Pts	Qualification
1	(Austria) Pascal Lin Cheng	2	1	1	3	2	+1	90	77	+13	1	Advance to round of 16
2	(Italy) Simone Piccinin	2	1	1	3	3	0	115	108	+7	1	Advance to round of 16
3	(Switzerland) Keishin Rimmer	2	1	1	2	3	−1	79	99	−20	1	
4	(Czech Republic) Vojtěch Havlíček (Z)	0	0	0	0	0	0	0	0	0	0	

Source: TS
(Z) Retired after two matches.

Date	Time	Player 1	Score	Player 2	Set 1	Set 2	Set 3
25 July	10:15	Simone Piccinin (Italy)	~~2–0~~	(Czech Republic) Vojtěch Havlíček	~~22–20~~	~~21–14~~	
25 July	10:15	Pascal Lin Cheng (Austria)	2–0	(Switzerland) Keishin Rimmer	21–10	21–9	
25 July	15:00	Pascal Lin Cheng (Austria)	W/O	(Czech Republic) Vojtěch Havlíček	21–11	0–0^{r}	
25 July	15:00	Simone Piccinin (Italy)	1–2	(Switzerland) Keishin Rimmer	17–21	21–18	19–21
26 July	11:30	Pascal Lin Cheng (Austria)	1–2	(Italy) Simone Piccinin	21–16	9–21	18–21
26 July	12:00	Vojtěch Havlíček (Czech Republic)	W/O	(Switzerland) Keishin Rimmer	Walkover		

=== Group 3 ===
Pos	Team	Pld	W	L	GF	GA	GD	PF	PA	PD	Pts	Qualification
1	(Spain) Ramón Rovira Gómez	3	3	0	6	0	+6	128	102	+26	3	Advance to round of 16
2	(Turkey) Buğra Aktaş	3	2	1	4	2	+2	124	107	+17	2	Advance to round of 16
3	(Croatia) Roko Pipunić	3	1	2	2	4	−2	107	109	−2	1	
4	(Norway) Aleksandrs Jakovlevs	3	0	3	0	6	−6	85	126	−41	0	

Source: TS

Date	Time	Player 1	Score	Player 2	Set 1	Set 2	Set 3
25 July	10:40	Buğra Aktaş (Turkey)	0–2	(Spain) Ramón Rovira Gómez	21–23	19–21	
25 July	10:40	Roko Pipunić (Croatia)	2–0	(Norway) Aleksandrs Jakovlevs	21–10	21–15	
25 July	15:00	Roko Pipunić (Croatia)	0–2	(Spain) Ramón Rovira Gómez	15–21	15–21	
25 July	15:25	Buğra Aktaş (Turkey)	2–0	(Norway) Aleksandrs Jakovlevs	21–11	21–17	
26 July	12:00	Roko Pipunić (Croatia)	0–2	(Turkey) Buğra Aktaş	17–21	18–21	
26 July	12:00	Ramón Rovira Gómez (Spain)	2–0	(Norway) Aleksandrs Jakovlevs	21–18	21–14	

=== Group 4 ===
Pos	Team	Pld	W	L	GF	GA	GD	PF	PA	PD	Pts	Qualification
1	(Sweden) Romeo Makboul	2	2	0	4	1	+3	104	54	+50	2	Advance to round of 16
2	(Portugal) Santiago Batalha	2	1	1	3	2	+1	79	97	−18	1	Advance to round of 16
3	(Republic of Ireland) Dylan Noble	2	0	2	0	4	−4	52	84	−32	0	
4	(Estonia) Andrei Schmidt (Z)	0	0	0	0	0	0	0	0	0	0	

Source: TS
(Z) Retired after two matches.

Date	Time	Player 1	Score	Player 2	Set 1	Set 2	Set 3
25 July	10:40	Romeo Makboul (Sweden)	2–0	(Republic of Ireland) Dylan Noble	21–7	21–10	
25 July	11:05	Santiago Batalha (Portugal)	~~2–0~~	(Estonia) Andrei Schmidt	~~21–14~~	~~21–19~~	
25 July	15:25	Romeo Makboul (Sweden)	~~2–0~~	(Estonia) Andrei Schmidt	~~21–10~~	~~21–11~~	
25 July	15:25	Santiago Batalha (Portugal)	2–0	(Republic of Ireland) Dylan Noble	21–17	21–18	
26 July	12:25	Romeo Makboul (Sweden)	2–1	(Portugal) Santiago Batalha	21–7	20–22	21–8
26 July	12:25	Andrei Schmidt (Estonia)	W/O	(Republic of Ireland) Dylan Noble	Walkover		

=== Group 5 ===
Pos	Team	Pld	W	L	GF	GA	GD	PF	PA	PD	Pts	Qualification
1	(Ukraine) Ivan Tsarehorodtsev	4	4	0	8	0	+8	168	106	+62	4	Advance to round of 16
2	(United Kingdom) Harper Leigh	4	3	1	6	3	+3	181	152	+29	3	Advance to round of 16
3	(Hungary) Csanád Horváth	4	2	2	5	5	0	185	170	+15	2	
4	(Serbia) Uglješa Mihajlović	4	1	3	3	6	−3	133	177	−44	1	
5	(Azerbaijan) Sarkhan Baghirov	4	0	4	0	8	−8	106	168	−62	0	

Source: TS

Date	Time	Player 1	Score	Player 2	Set 1	Set 2	Set 3
25 July	9:00	Sarkhan Baghirov (Azerbaijan)	0–2	(Hungary) Csanád Horváth	10–21	9–21	
25 July	9:00	Harper Leigh (United Kingdom)	2–0	(Serbia) Uglješa Mihajlović	21–14	21–6	
25 July	13:15	Harper Leigh (United Kingdom)	2–1	(Hungary) Csanád Horváth	21–16	18–21	24–22
25 July	13:40	Ivan Tsarehorodtsev (Ukraine)	2–0	(Serbia) Uglješa Mihajlović	21–12	21–13	
26 July	9:00	Harper Leigh (United Kingdom)	0–2	(Ukraine) Ivan Tsarehorodtsev	16–21	18–21	
26 July	9:00	Sarkhan Baghirov (Azerbaijan)	0–2	(Serbia) Uglješa Mihajlović	16–21	19–21	
26 July	12:25	Csanád Horváth (Hungary)	2–1	(Serbia) Uglješa Mihajlović	16–21	21–8	21–17
26 July	12:50	Sarkhan Baghirov (Azerbaijan)	0–2	(Ukraine) Ivan Tsarehorodtsev	9–21	12–21	
26 July	15:50	Harper Leigh (United Kingdom)	2–0	(Azerbaijan) Sarkhan Baghirov	21–14	21–17	
26 July	16:15	Ivan Tsarehorodtsev (Ukraine)	2–0	(Hungary) Csanád Horváth	21–13	21–13	

=== Group 6 ===
Pos	Team	Pld	W	L	GF	GA	GD	PF	PA	PD	Pts	Qualification
1	(Denmark) Salomon Thomasen	4	4	0	8	0	+8	168	80	+88	4	Advance to round of 16
2	(Germany) Luis Pongratz	4	3	1	6	3	+3	163	145	+18	3	Advance to round of 16
3	(Netherlands) Mats Duwel	4	2	2	5	4	+1	160	142	+18	2	
4	(Slovenia) Vid Koščak	4	1	3	2	6	−4	117	159	−42	1	
5	(Greece) Evangelos Anastasiou	4	0	4	0	8	−8	87	169	−82	0	

Source: TS

Date	Time	Player 1	Score	Player 2	Set 1	Set 2	Set 3
25 July	9:00	Luis Pongratz (Germany)	2–0	(Slovenia) Vid Koščak	21–12	21–15	
25 July	9:25	Salomon Thomasen (Denmark)	2–0	(Netherlands) Mats Duwel	21–9	21–13	
25 July	13:40	Luis Pongratz (Germany)	2–1	(Netherlands) Mats Duwel	21–15	9–21	21–18
25 July	13:40	Evangelos Anastasiou (Greece)	0–2	(Slovenia) Vid Koščak	13–21	20–22	
26 July	9:00	Salomon Thomasen (Denmark)	2–0	(Slovenia) Vid Koščak	21–10	21–10	
26 July	9:25	Luis Pongratz (Germany)	2–0	(Greece) Evangelos Anastasiou	21–12	21–10	
26 July	12:50	Salomon Thomasen (Denmark)	2–0	(Greece) Evangelos Anastasiou	21–6	21–4	
26 July	12:50	Mats Duwel (Netherlands)	2–0	(Slovenia) Vid Koščak	21–11	21–16	
26 July	16:15	Luis Pongratz (Germany)	0–2	(Denmark) Salomon Thomasen	16–21	12–21	
26 July	16:15	Evangelos Anastasiou (Greece)	0–2	(Netherlands) Mats Duwel	13–21	9–21	

=== Group 7 ===
Pos	Team	Pld	W	L	GF	GA	GD	PF	PA	PD	Pts	Qualification
1	(Luxembourg) Noah Warning	4	4	0	8	1	+7	187	129	+58	4	Advance to round of 16
2	(Lithuania) Domas Pakšys	4	3	1	7	3	+4	197	159	+38	3	Advance to round of 16
3	(Israel) Sharon Perelshtein	4	2	2	5	5	0	183	171	+12	2	
4	(Slovakia) Matúš Poláček (H)	4	1	3	3	7	−4	150	184	−34	1	
5	(Latvia) Toms Sala	4	0	4	1	8	−7	113	187	−74	0	

Source: TS
(H) Host

Date	Time	Player 1	Score	Player 2	Set 1	Set 2	Set 3
25 July	9:25	Matúš Poláček (Slovakia)	2–1	(Latvia) Toms Sala	21–4	19–21	21–15
25 July	9:25	Noah Warning (Luxembourg)	2–1	(Lithuania) Domas Pakšys	19–21	21–18	21–18
25 July	14:05	Noah Warning (Luxembourg)	2–0	(Latvia) Toms Sala	21–8	21–14	
25 July	14:05	Sharon Perelshtein (Israel)	1–2	(Lithuania) Domas Pakšys	21–13	12–21	17–21
26 July	9:25	Noah Warning (Luxembourg)	2–0	(Israel) Sharon Perelshtein	21–14	21–18	
26 July	9:25	Matúš Poláček (Slovakia)	0–2	(Lithuania) Domas Pakšys	9–21	20–22	
26 July	13:15	Matúš Poláček (Slovakia)	1–2	(Israel) Sharon Perelshtein	9–21	21–17	12–21
26 July	13:15	Toms Sala (Latvia)	0–2	(Lithuania) Domas Pakšys	9–21	10–21	
26 July	16:40	Noah Warning (Luxembourg)	2–0	(Slovakia) Matúš Poláček	21–9	21–9	
26 July	17:05	Sharon Perelshtein (Israel)	2–0	(Latvia) Toms Sala	21–15	21–17	

=== Group 8 ===
Pos	Team	Pld	W	L	GF	GA	GD	PF	PA	PD	Pts	Qualification
1	(Belgium) Arnaud Huberty	4	4	0	8	0	+8	173	89	+84	4	Advance to round of 16
2	(Moldova) Nicolae Enachi	4	3	1	6	3	+3	184	149	+35	3	Advance to round of 16
3	(Kosovo) Baton Haxhiu	4	0	4	0	8	−8	54	168	−114	0	
4	(Iceland) Máni Berg Ellertsson	4	1	3	4	6	−2	165	170	−5	1	
5	(Armenia) Manvel Harutyunyan	4	2	2	4	5	−1	156	156	0	2	

Source: TS

Date	Time	Player 1	Score	Player 2	Set 1	Set 2	Set 3
25 July	9:50	Nicolae Enachi (Moldova)	2–1	(Iceland) Máni Berg Ellertsson	21–23	21–14	21–14
25 July	9:50	Arnaud Huberty (Belgium)	2–0	(Armenia) Manvel Harutyunyan	21–11	21–19	
25 July	14:05	Arnaud Huberty (Belgium)	2–0	(Iceland) Máni Berg Ellertsson	21–9	21–8	
25 July	14:30	Baton Haxhiu (Kosovo)	0–2	(Armenia) Manvel Harutyunyan	6–21	11–21	
26 July	9:50	Arnaud Huberty (Belgium)	2–0	(Kosovo) Baton Haxhiu	21–2	21–3	
26 July	9:50	Nicolae Enachi (Moldova)	2–0	(Armenia) Manvel Harutyunyan	21–13	21–16	
26 July	13:15	Máni Berg Ellertsson (Iceland)	1–2	(Armenia) Manvel Harutyunyan	18–21	21–13	16–21
26 July	13:40	Nicolae Enachi (Moldova)	2–0	(Kosovo) Baton Haxhiu	21–6	21–16	
26 July	16:40	Arnaud Huberty (Belgium)	2–0	(Moldova) Nicolae Enachi	21–13	26–24	
26 July	16:40	Baton Haxhiu (Kosovo)	0–2	(Iceland) Máni Berg Ellertsson	3–21	7–21	

=== Finals ===
Round of 16
1-1	(Poland) Mateusz Gołaś	21	21
7-2	(Lithuania) Domas Pakšys	5	10
8-1	(Belgium) Arnaud Huberty	11	17
3-2	(Turkey) Buğra Aktaş	21	21
4-1	(Sweden) Romeo Makboul	19	21	21
2-2	(Italy) Simone Piccinin	21	10	8
5-1	(Ukraine) Ivan Tsarehorodtsev	17	9
6-2	(Germany) Luis Pongratz	21	21
8-2	(Moldova) Nicolae Enachi	10	3
6-1	(Denmark) Salomon Thomasen	21	21
4-2	(Portugal) Santiago Batalha	21	21
3-1	(Spain) Ramón Rovira Gómez	18	14
1-2	(Cyprus) Nikolas Kokosis	19	11
7-1	(Luxembourg) Noah Warning	21	21
5-2	(United Kingdom) Harper Leigh	22	19	19
2-1	(Austria) Pascal Lin Cheng	20	21	21

Quarter-finals
1-1	(Poland) Mateusz Gołaś	21	21
3-2	(Turkey) Buğra Aktaş	14	17
4-1	(Sweden) Romeo Makboul	21	20	21
6-2	(Germany) Luis Pongratz	18	22	15
6-1	(Denmark) Salomon Thomasen	21	21
4-2	(Portugal) Santiago Batalha	9	8
7-1	(Luxembourg) Noah Warning	18	10
2-1	(Austria) Pascal Lin Cheng	21	21

Semi-finals
1-1	(Poland) Mateusz Gołaś (bronze)	15	18
4-1	(Sweden) Romeo Makboul	21	21
6-1	(Denmark) Salomon Thomasen	21	21
2-1	(Austria) Pascal Lin Cheng (bronze)	9	9

Gold medal match
4-1	(Sweden) Romeo Makboul (silver)	21	21	15
6-1	(Denmark) Salomon Thomasen (gold)	19	23	21

== Girls' singles ==
=== Seeds ===
1. (Slovakia) Johanka Ivanovičová (withdrew, substituted by Lea Kyselicová)
2. (Poland) Maja Janko (quarter-finals)
3. (Czech Republic) Lucie Krulová (quarter-finals)
4. (Turkey) Ravza Bodur (silver medalist)
5. (Finland) Nella Nyqvist (gold medalist)
6. (Croatia) Jelena Buchberger (round of 16)
7. (Switzerland) Leila Zarrouk (quarter-finals)
8. (Hungary) Petra Hart (round of 16)

=== Group 1 ===
Pos	Team	Pld	W	L	GF	GA	GD	PF	PA	PD	Pts	Qualification
1	(Sweden) Sofia Strömvall	3	3	0	6	2	+4	154	131	+23	3	Advance to round of 16
2	(Slovenia) Anja Blazina	3	2	1	5	2	+3	142	94	+48	2	Advance to round of 16
3	(Spain) Macarena Izquierdo	3	1	2	2	4	−2	82	111	−29	1	
4	(Slovakia) Lea Kyselicová (H)	3	0	3	1	6	−5	99	141	−42	0	

Source: TS
(H) Host

Date	Time	Player 1	Score	Player 2	Set 1	Set 2	Set 3
25 July	12:25	Lea Kyselicová (Slovakia)	1–2	(Sweden) Sofia Strömvall	14–21	21–15	15–21
25 July	12:50	Macarena Izquierdo (Spain)	0–2	(Slovenia) Anja Blazina	10–21	7–21	
25 July	17:05	Lea Kyselicová (Slovakia)	0–2	(Slovenia) Anja Blazina	16–21	6–21	
25 July	17:05	Macarena Izquierdo (Spain)	0–2	(Sweden) Sofia Strömvall	13–21	10–21	
26 July	15:00	Lea Kyselicová (Slovakia)	0–2	(Spain) Macarena Izquierdo	11–21	16–21	
26 July	15:25	Anja Blazina (Slovenia)	1–2	(Sweden) Sofia Strömvall	19–21	21–13	18–21

=== Group 2 ===
Pos	Team	Pld	W	L	GF	GA	GD	PF	PA	PD	Pts	Qualification
1	(Poland) Maja Janko	3	3	0	6	1	+5	141	94	+47	3	Advance to round of 16
2	(Israel) Alina Bergelson	3	2	1	4	2	+2	108	86	+22	2	Advance to round of 16
3	(Luxembourg) Mara Hafner	3	1	2	3	4	−1	102	125	−23	1	
4	(Greece) Thomai Agapi Pavlidou	3	0	3	0	6	−6	80	126	−46	0	

Source: TS

Date	Time	Player 1	Score	Player 2	Set 1	Set 2	Set 3
25 July	12:50	Thomai Agapi Pavlidou (Greece)	0–2	(Israel) Alina Bergelson	9–21	15–21	
25 July	12:50	Maja Janko (Poland)	2–1	(Luxembourg) Mara Hafner	15–21	21–6	21–13
25 July	17:30	Maja Janko (Poland)	2–0	(Israel) Alina Bergelson	21–14	21–10	
25 July	17:30	Thomai Agapi Pavlidou (Greece)	0–2	(Luxembourg) Mara Hafner	14–21	12–21	
26 July	15:25	Maja Janko (Poland)	2–0	(Greece) Thomai Agapi Pavlidou	21–15	21–15	
26 July	15:25	Alina Bergelson (Israel)	2–0	(Luxembourg) Mara Hafner	21–12	21–8	

=== Group 3 ===
Pos	Team	Pld	W	L	GF	GA	GD	PF	PA	PD	Pts	Qualification
1	(Czech Republic) Lucie Krulová	3	3	0	6	0	+6	126	47	+79	3	Advance to round of 16
2	(Estonia) Emilia Shapovalova	3	2	1	4	2	+2	112	120	−8	2	Advance to round of 16
3	(Italy) Carolin Rauner	3	1	2	2	4	−2	97	117	−20	1	
4	(Georgia (country)) Elisabed Zumbulidze	3	0	3	0	6	−6	76	127	−51	0	

Source: TS

Date	Time	Player 1	Score	Player 2	Set 1	Set 2	Set 3
25 July	13:15	Carolin Rauner (Italy)	2–0	(Georgia (country)) Elisabed Zumbulidze	21–17	21–14	
25 July	13:15	Lucie Krulová (Czech Republic)	2–0	(Estonia) Emilia Shapovalova	21–13	21–12	
25 July	17:30	Lucie Krulová (Czech Republic)	2–0	(Georgia (country)) Elisabed Zumbulidze	21–5	21–2	
25 July	17:45	Carolin Rauner (Italy)	0–2	(Estonia) Emilia Shapovalova	19–21	21–23	
26 July	15:50	Lucie Krulová (Czech Republic)	2–0	(Italy) Carolin Rauner	21–9	21–6	
26 July	15:50	Elisabed Zumbulidze (Georgia (country))	0–2	(Estonia) Emilia Shapovalova	18–21	20–22	

=== Group 4 ===
Pos	Team	Pld	W	L	GF	GA	GD	PF	PA	PD	Pts	Qualification
1	(Turkey) Ravza Bodur	4	4	0	8	1	+7	184	80	+104	4	Advance to round of 16
2	(Ukraine) Anna Kovalenko	4	3	1	7	2	+5	170	117	+53	3	Advance to round of 16
3	(Iceland) Lilja Bu	4	2	2	4	5	−1	143	148	−5	2	
4	(Azerbaijan) Hajar Nuriyeva	4	1	3	3	6	−3	150	155	−5	1	
5	(Albania) Fjojna Janko	4	0	4	0	8	−8	21	168	−147	0	

Source: TS

Date	Time	Player 1	Score	Player 2	Set 1	Set 2	Set 3
25 July	11:30	Fjojna Janko (Albania)	0–2	(Ukraine) Anna Kovalenko	3–21	1–21	
25 July	11:30	Ravza Bodur (Turkey)	2–0	(Iceland) Lilja Bu	21–10	21–5	
25 July	15:50	Ravza Bodur (Turkey)	2–1	(Ukraine) Anna Kovalenko	16–21	21–11	21–12
25 July	16:15	Hajar Nuriyeva (Azerbaijan)	1–2	(Iceland) Lilja Bu	19–21	21–17	19–21
26 July	9:50	Fjojna Janko (Albania)	0–2	(Iceland) Lilja Bu	1–21	4–21	
26 July	10:15	Ravza Bodur (Turkey)	2–0	(Azerbaijan) Hajar Nuriyeva	21–11	21–10	
26 July	13:40	Fjojna Janko (Albania)	0–2	(Azerbaijan) Hajar Nuriyeva	9–21	3–21	
26 July	13:40	Anna Kovalenko (Ukraine)	2–0	(Iceland) Lilja Bu	21–16	21–11	
26 July	17:05	Ravza Bodur (Turkey)	2–0	(Albania) Fjojna Janko	21–0	21–0	
26 July	17:05	Hajar Nuriyeva (Azerbaijan)	0–2	(Ukraine) Anna Kovalenko	17–21	11–21	

=== Group 5 ===
Pos	Team	Pld	W	L	GF	GA	GD	PF	PA	PD	Pts	Qualification
1	(Finland) Nella Nyqvist	3	3	0	6	0	+6	126	46	+80	3	Advance to round of 16
2	(Lithuania) Viltė Paulauskaitė	3	2	1	4	2	+2	103	112	−9	2	Advance to round of 16
3	(Armenia) Lusine Smbatyan	3	1	2	2	4	−2	92	121	−29	1	
4	(Moldova) Paola Ginga	3	0	3	0	6	−6	84	126	−42	0	
5	(Cyprus) Maria Eleni Aristopoulou (Z)	0	0	0	0	0	0	0	0	0	0	

Source: TS
(Z) Retired after one match.

Date	Time	Player 1	Score	Player 2	Set 1	Set 2	Set 3
25 July	11:05	Paola Ginga (Moldova)	0–2	(Lithuania) Viltė Paulauskaitė	19–21	18–21	
25 July	11:05	Nella Nyqvist (Finland)	2–0	(Armenia) Lusine Smbatyan	21–9	21–8	
25 July	15:50	Nella Nyqvist (Finland)	2–0	(Lithuania) Viltė Paulauskaitė	21–9	21–10	
25 July	15:50	Maria Eleni Aristopoulou (Cyprus)	~~0–2~~	(Armenia) Lusine Smbatyan	~~20–22~~	~~16–21~~	
26 July	10:15	Nella Nyqvist (Finland)	W/O	(Cyprus) Maria Eleni Aristopoulou	Walkover		
26 July	10:15	Paola Ginga (Moldova)	0–2	(Armenia) Lusine Smbatyan	18–21	19–21	
26 July	14:05	Paola Ginga (Moldova)	W/O	(Cyprus) Maria Eleni Aristopoulou	Walkover		
26 July	14:05	Viltė Paulauskaitė (Lithuania)	2–0	(Armenia) Lusine Smbatyan	21–19	21–14	
26 July	17:30	Nella Nyqvist (Finland)	2–0	(Moldova) Paola Ginga	21–4	21–6	
26 July	17:30	Maria Eleni Aristopoulou (Cyprus)	W/O	(Lithuania) Viltė Paulauskaitė	Walkover		

=== Group 6 ===
Pos	Team	Pld	W	L	GF	GA	GD	PF	PA	PD	Pts	Qualification
1	(Croatia) Jelena Buchberger	3	3	0	6	1	+5	144	104	+40	3	Advance to round of 16
2	(Republic of Ireland) Michelle Shochan	3	2	1	5	2	+3	137	130	+7	2	Advance to round of 16
3	(Austria) Anja Rumpold	3	1	2	2	4	−2	105	109	−4	1	
4	(Germany) Marie Stern	3	0	3	0	6	−6	85	128	−43	0	
5	(United Kingdom) Varsha Kumar (Z)	0	0	0	0	0	0	0	0	0	0	

Source: TS
(Z) Retired after three matches.

Date	Time	Player 1	Score	Player 2	Set 1	Set 2	Set 3
25 July	11:30	Jelena Buchberger (Croatia)	~~1–2~~	(United Kingdom) Varsha Kumar	~~16–21~~	~~21–15~~	~~21–15~~
25 July	12:00	Anja Rumpold (Austria)	2–0	(Germany) Marie Stern	21–9	21–16	
25 July	16:15	Jelena Buchberger (Croatia)	2–0	(Germany) Marie Stern	21–18	21–3	
25 July	16:15	Michelle Shochan (Republic of Ireland)	~~2–1~~	(United Kingdom) Varsha Kumar	~~22–20~~	~~22–24~~	~~21–15~~
26 July	10:40	Jelena Buchberger (Croatia)	2–1	(Republic of Ireland) Michelle Shochan	18–21	21–18	21–12
26 July	10:40	Anja Rumpold (Austria)	~~0–2~~	(United Kingdom) Varsha Kumar	~~10–21~~	~~18–21~~	
26 July	14:05	Marie Stern (Germany)	Ret.	(United Kingdom) Varsha Kumar	8–5^{r}		
26 July	14:30	Anja Rumpold (Austria)	0–2	(Republic of Ireland) Michelle Shochan	13–21	18–21	
26 July	17:30	Jelena Buchberger (Croatia)	2–0	(Austria) Anja Rumpold	21–14	21–18	
26 July	17:45	Michelle Shochan (Republic of Ireland)	2–0	(Germany) Marie Stern	23–21	21–18	

=== Group 7 ===
Pos	Team	Pld	W	L	GF	GA	GD	PF	PA	PD	Pts	Qualification
1	(Switzerland) Leila Zarrouk	4	4	0	8	0	+8	168	78	+90	4	Advance to round of 16
2	(Netherlands) Flora Wang	4	3	1	6	2	+4	153	91	+62	3	Advance to round of 16
3	(Belgium) Amber Boonen	4	2	2	4	4	0	134	112	+22	2	
4	(Latvia) Elza Zitane	4	1	3	2	6	−4	75	152	−77	1	
5	(Serbia) Masa Aleksic	4	0	4	0	8	−8	71	168	−97	0	

Source: TS

Date	Time	Player 1	Score	Player 2	Set 1	Set 2	Set 3
25 July	12:00	Masa Aleksic (Serbia)	0–2	(Latvia) Elza Zitane	16–21	10–21	
25 July	12:00	Leila Zarrouk (Switzerland)	2–0	(Netherlands) Flora Wang	21–12	21–14	
25 July	16:40	Leila Zarrouk (Switzerland)	2–0	(Latvia) Elza Zitane	21–7	21–7	
25 July	16:40	Amber Boonen (Belgium)	0–2	(Netherlands) Flora Wang	6–21	20–22	
26 July	10:40	Masa Aleksic (Serbia)	0–2	(Netherlands) Flora Wang	8–21	8–21	
26 July	11:05	Leila Zarrouk (Switzerland)	2–0	(Belgium) Amber Boonen	21–8	21–16	
26 July	14:30	Masa Aleksic (Serbia)	0–2	(Belgium) Amber Boonen	7–21	8–21	
26 July	14:30	Elza Zitane (Latvia)	0–2	(Netherlands) Flora Wang	3–21	4–21	
26 July	17:45	Leila Zarrouk (Switzerland)	2–0	(Serbia) Masa Aleksic	21–9	21–5	
26 July	17:45	Amber Boonen (Belgium)	2–0	(Latvia) Elza Zitane	21–5	21–7	

=== Group 8 ===
Pos	Team	Pld	W	L	GF	GA	GD	PF	PA	PD	Pts	Qualification
1	(Denmark) Maria Tommerup	4	4	0	8	0	+8	168	76	+92	4	Advance to round of 16
2	(Hungary) Petra Hart	4	3	1	6	2	+4	158	112	+46	3	Advance to round of 16
3	(Norway) Katja Ellingsen	4	2	2	4	4	0	135	127	+8	2	
4	(Portugal) Francisca Vasconcelos	4	1	3	2	6	−4	132	134	−2	1	
5	(Kosovo) Fijona Mustafa	4	0	4	0	8	−8	24	168	−144	0	

Source: TS

Date	Time	Player 1	Score	Player 2	Set 1	Set 2	Set 3
25 July	12:25	Maria Tommerup (Denmark)	2–0	(Portugal) Francisca Vasconcelos	21–9	21–13	
25 July	12:25	Petra Hart (Hungary)	2–0	(Kosovo) Fijona Mustafa	21–2	21–2	
25 July	16:40	Petra Hart (Hungary)	2–0	(Portugal) Francisca Vasconcelos	21–14	21–17	
25 July	17:05	Katja Ellingsen (Norway)	2–0	(Kosovo) Fijona Mustafa	21–2	21–4	
26 July	11:05	Petra Hart (Hungary)	2–0	(Norway) Katja Ellingsen	21–17	21–18	
26 July	11:05	Maria Tommerup (Denmark)	2–0	(Kosovo) Fijona Mustafa	21–1	21–5	
26 July	15:00	Maria Tommerup (Denmark)	2–0	(Norway) Katja Ellingsen	21–7	21–9	
26 July	15:00	Francisca Vasconcelos (Portugal)	2–0	(Kosovo) Fijona Mustafa	21–4	21–4	
26 July	18:00	Petra Hart (Hungary)	0–2	(Denmark) Maria Tommerup	18–21	14–21	
26 July	18:00	Katja Ellingsen (Norway)	2–0	(Portugal) Francisca Vasconcelos	21–18	21–19	

=== Finals ===
Round of 16
1-1	(Sweden) Sofia Strömvall	18	21	21
6-2	(Republic of Ireland) Michelle Shochan	21	19	13
8-1	(Denmark) Maria Tommerup	21	21
7-2	(Netherlands) Flora Wang	12	13
3-1	(Czech Republic) Lucie Krulová	21	16	21
4-2	(Ukraine) Anna Kovalenko	9	21	16
5-1	(Finland) Nella Nyqvist	21	21
2-2	(Israel) Alina Bergelson	13	16
8-2	(Hungary) Petra Hart	21	17
7-1	(Switzerland) Leila Zarrouk	23	21
1-2	(Slovenia) Anja Blazina	18	15
4-1	(Turkey) Ravza Bodur	21	21
5-2	(Lithuania) Viltė Paulauskaitė	21	21
6-1	(Croatia) Jelena Buchberger	19	17
3-2	(Estonia) Emilia Shapovalova	15	18
2-1	(Poland) Maja Janko	21	21

Quarter-finals
1-1	(Sweden) Sofia Strömvall	16	13
8-1	(Denmark) Maria Tommerup	21	21
3-1	(Czech Republic) Lucie Krulová	13	21
5-1	(Finland) Nella Nyqvist	21	23
7-1	(Switzerland) Leila Zarrouk	12	11
4-1	(Turkey) Ravza Bodur	21	21
5-2	(Lithuania) Viltė Paulauskaitė	16	25	21
2-1	(Poland) Maja Janko	21	23	19

Semi-finals
8-1	(Denmark) Maria Tommerup (bronze)	14	11
5-1	(Finland) Nella Nyqvist	21	21
4-1	(Turkey) Ravza Bodur	21	21
5-2	(Lithuania) Viltė Paulauskaitė (bronze)	8	13

Gold medal match
5-1	(Finland) Nella Nyqvist (gold)	20	21	21
4-1	(Turkey) Ravza Bodur (silver)	22	16	14

== Mixed doubles ==
=== Seeds ===
1. (Austria) Pascal Lin Cheng / Anja Rumpold (third round)
2. (Belgium) Arnaud Huberty / Amber Boonen (third round)
3. (Netherlands) Mats Duwel / Flora Wang (quarter-finals)
4. (Slovakia) Matúš Poláček / Johanka Ivanovičová (withdrew, substituted by Lea Kyselicová)
5. (Hungary) Csanád Horváth / Petra Hart (third round)
6. (Turkey) Buğra Aktaş / Ravza Bodur (gold medalists)
7. (Denmark) Salomon Thomasen / Maria Tommerup (bronze medalists)
8. (Germany) Luis Pongratz / Marie Stern (bronze medalists)

=== Finals ===
Semi-finals
7	(Denmark) Salomon Thomasen (Denmark) Maria Tommerup	26	21	19
(Poland) Mateusz Gołaś (Poland) Maja Janko	28	16	21
6	(Turkey) Buğra Aktaş (Turkey) Ravza Bodur	22	21
8	(Germany) Luis Pongratz (Germany) Marie Stern	20	7

Gold medal match
(Poland) Mateusz Gołaś (Poland) Maja Janko	16	17
6	(Turkey) Buğra Aktaş (Turkey) Ravza Bodur	21	21

=== Top half ===
==== Section 1 ====
First round
(Cyprus) N Kokosis (Cyprus) M E Aristopoulou
(Israel) S Perelshtein (Israel) A Bergelson	w	/	o

Second round
1	(Austria) P L Cheng (Austria) A Rumpold	w	/	o
(Albania) G Pili (Albania) F Janko
(Luxembourg) N Warning (Luxembourg) M Hafner	7	10
(Ukraine) I Tsarehorodtsev (Ukraine) A Kovalenko	21	21
7	(Denmark) S Thomasen (Denmark) M Tommerup	21	21
(Iceland) M B Ellertsson (Iceland) L Bu	6	10
(Croatia) R Pipunić (Croatia) J Buchberger	21	16	21
(Israel) S Perelshtein (Israel) A Bergelson	13	21	18

Third round
1	(Austria) P L Cheng (Austria) A Rumpold	14	13
(Ukraine) I Tsarehorodtsev (Ukraine) A Kovalenko	21	21
7	(Denmark) S Thomasen (Denmark) M Tommerup	21	21
(Croatia) R Pipunić (Croatia) J Buchberger	18	11

Quarter-finals
(Ukraine) I Tsarehorodtsev (Ukraine) A Kovalenko	19	16
7	(Denmark) S Thomasen (Denmark) M Tommerup	21	21

==== Section 2 ====
First round
(Serbia) M Mihajlović (Serbia) M Aleksic	13	7
(Poland) M Gołaś (Poland) M Janko	21	21

Second round
(Netherlands) M Duwel (Netherlands) F Wang	21	21
(Azerbaijan) S Baghirov (Azerbaijan) H Nuriyeva	8	9
(Georgia (country)) G Mzhavia (Georgia (country)) E Zumbulidze	8	11
(Greece) E Anastasiou (Greece) T A Pavlidou	21	21
5	(Hungary) C Horváth (Hungary) P Hart	21	21
(Czech Republic) V Havlíček (Czech Republic) L Krulová	13	14
(Portugal) S Batalha (Portugal) F Vasconcelos	13	11
(Poland) M Gołaś (Poland) M Janko	21	21

Third round
3	(Netherlands) M Duwel (Netherlands) F Wang	21	21
(Greece) E Anastasiou (Greece) T A Pavlidou	4	11
5	(Hungary) C Horváth (Hungary) P Hart	14	12
(Poland) M Gołaś (Poland) M Janko	21	21

Quarter-finals
3	(Netherlands) M Duwel (Netherlands) F Wang	17	16
(Poland) M Gołaś (Poland) M Janko	21	21

=== Bottom half ===
==== Section 3 ====
First round
(Armenia) M Harutyunyan (Armenia) L Smbatyan	18	19
(Republic of Ireland) D Noble (Republic of Ireland) M Shochan	21	21

Second round
(Republic of Ireland) D Noble (Republic of Ireland) M Shochan	22	18
(Norway) A Jakovlevs (Norway) K Ellingsen	24	21
(Estonia) A Schmidt (Estonia) E Shapovalova
6	(Turkey) B Aktaş (Turkey) R Bodur	w	/	o
(Spain) R Rovira Gómez (Spain) M Izquierdo	21	21
(Moldova) N Enachi (Moldova) P Ginga	12	10
(Sweden) R Makboul (Sweden) S Strömvall	21	21
SUB	(Slovakia) M Poláček (Slovakia) L Kyselicová	11	10

Third round
(Norway) A Jakovlevs (Norway) K Ellingsen	6	17
6	(Turkey) B Aktaş (Turkey) R Bodur	21	21
(Spain) R Rovira Gómez (Spain) M Izquierdo	14	15
(Sweden) R Makboul (Sweden) S Strömvall	21	21

Quarter-finals
6	(Turkey) B Aktaş (Turkey) R Bodur	21	21
(Sweden) R Makboul (Sweden) S Strömvall	18	13

==== Section 4 ====
First round
(Slovenia) V Koščak (Slovenia) A Blazina	20	21	17
(Italy) S Piccinin (Italy) C Rauner	22	15	21

Second round
(Italy) S Piccinin (Italy) C Rauner	21	21
(Latvia) T Sala (Latvia) E Zitane	16	13
(United Kingdom) H Leigh (United Kingdom) V Kumar
8	(Germany) L Pongratz (Germany) M Stern	w	/	o
(Lithuania) D Pakšys (Lithuania) V Paulauskaitė	21	17	18
(Switzerland) K Rimmer (Switzerland) L Zarrouk	14	21	21
(Kosovo) B Haxhiu (Kosovo) F Mustafa	3	6
2	(Belgium) A Huberty (Belgium) A Boonen	21	21

Third round
(Italy) S Piccinin (Italy) C Rauner	14	11
8	(Germany) L Pongratz (Germany) M Stern	21	21
(Switzerland) K Rimmer (Switzerland) L Zarrouk	21	18	24
2	(Belgium) A Huberty (Belgium) A Boonen	13	21	22

Quarter-finals
8	(Germany) L Pongratz (Germany) M Stern	21	17	21
(Switzerland) K Rimmer (Switzerland) L Zarrouk	18	21	13
