= Badminton at the 2025 European Youth Summer Olympic Festival =

- Venue: Nevena Georgieva Primary School, Skopje, North Macedonia
- Date: 21–26 July 2025

Badminton at the 2025 European Youth Summer Olympic Festival will be held in Skopje, North Macedonia, at the Nevena Georgieva Primary School from 21 to 26 July 2025. This is the first time since 2021 that badminton is included in the European Youth Summer Olympic Festival.

The program includes boys' singles, girls' singles, and mixed doubles events.

== Medal table ==
* Host nation (North Macedonia)

Rank	Nation	Gold	Silver	Bronze	Total
1	Great Britain	2	0	0	2
2	Germany	1	0	1	2
3	Switzerland	0	2	0	2
4	Denmark	0	1	2	3
5	Croatia	0	0	1	1
5	Serbia	0	0	1	1
5	Turkey	0	0	1	1
Totals (7 entries)		3	3	6	12

=== Medalists ===
Event	Gold	Silver	Bronze
Boys' singles	Kalyan Manoj; Great Britain	Santiago Araujo; Switzerland	Maxi Kauffmann; Denmark
Boys' singles	Kalyan Manoj; Great Britain	Santiago Araujo; Switzerland	Milan Zeisig; Germany
Girls' singles	Ishasriya Mekala; Great Britain	Diya Mary Cherian; Denmark	Irmak Rana Yemişen; Turkey
Girls' singles	Ishasriya Mekala; Great Britain	Diya Mary Cherian; Denmark	Maja Pranić; Croatia
Mixed doubles	Germany; Milan Zeisig; Laira Rohl	Switzerland; Santiago Araujo; Ainara Lara Putri	Denmark; Maxi Kauffmann; Diya Mary Cherian
Mixed doubles	Germany; Milan Zeisig; Laira Rohl	Switzerland; Santiago Araujo; Ainara Lara Putri	Serbia; Aleksa Radovanović; Teodora Latas
