= Albania national badminton team =

National badminton team representing Albania

Albania
- Association: Federata Shqiptare e Badmintonit (FSHBAD)
- Confederation: BE (Europe)
- President: Bardhi Lavdari

BWF ranking
- Current ranking: Unranked (2 January 2024)
- Highest ranking: Unranked

The Albania national badminton team (Albanian: Kombëtarja shqiptare e badmintonit) represents Albania in international badminton team competitions. The Albania national team is controlled by the Albania Badminton Federation and is under the Badminton Europe confederation. Being part of the Balkan region, the Albania team competes in the Balkan Badminton Championships.

The Albanian junior team competed in the 2016 Balkan U19 Team Championships. The team were eliminated in the group stages. The junior team have also competed in the Mediterranean Junior Team Championships.

== History ==
Badminton began in Albania in the early 2000s. The Albanian Badminton Federation was formed in 2005 and became a member of Badminton Europe in 2006. Albania started sending its badminton athletes to compete in international tournaments in 2013.

== Competitive record ==
=== Thomas Cup ===
| Year | Round | Pos |
|---|---|---|
| 1949 to 2024 | Did not enter | |
| 2026 | To be determined | |
| 2028 | To be determined | |
| 2030 | To be determined | |

=== Uber Cup ===
| Year | Round | Pos |
|---|---|---|
| 1957 to 2024 | Did not enter | |
| 2026 | To be determined | |
| 2028 | To be determined | |
| 2030 | To be determined | |

=== Sudirman Cup ===
| Year | Round | Pos |
|---|---|---|
| 1989 to 2023 | Did not enter | |
| 2025 | TBD | |
| 2027 | TBD | |
| 2029 | TBD | |

=== European Team Championships ===
==== Men's team ====
| Year | Round | Pos |
|---|---|---|
| 2006 to 2024 | Did not enter | |
| 2026 | TBD | |
| 2028 | TBD | |
| 2030 | TBD | |

==== Women's team ====
| Year | Round | Pos |
|---|---|---|
| 2006 to 2024 | Did not enter | |
| 2026 | TBD | |
| 2028 | TBD | |
| 2030 | TBD | |

==== Mixed team ====
| Year | Round | Pos |
|---|---|---|
| 1972 to 2023 | Did not enter | |
| 2025 | To be determined | |
| 2027 | To be determined | |
| 2029 | To be determined | |

=== Balkan Team Championships ===
==== Mixed team ====
| Year | Round | Pos |
|---|---|---|
| 1995 to 2018 | Did not enter | |

**Red border color indicates tournament was held on home soil.

== Junior competitive record ==
=== Suhandinata Cup ===
| Year | Round | Pos |
|---|---|---|
| 2000 to 2024 | Did not enter | |
| 2025 | To be determined | |

=== European Junior Team Championships ===
==== Mixed team ====
| Year | Round | Pos |
|---|---|---|
| 1975 to 2022 | Did not enter | |
| 2024 | To be determined | |

=== Balkan Junior Team Championships ===
==== Mixed team ====
| Year | Round | Pos |
|---|---|---|
| 2006 | Did not enter | |
| 2007 | Did not enter | |
| 2008 | Did not enter | |
| 2010 | Did not enter | |
| 2011 | Did not enter | |
| 2013 | Did not enter | |
| 2015 | Did not enter | |
| 2016 | Group stage | 6th |
| 2017 | Did not enter | |
| 2019 | Did not enter | |

=== Mediterranean Junior Team Championships ===
==== Mixed team ====
| Year | Round | Pos |
|---|---|---|
| 2015 | Group stage | 8th |
| 2017 | Group stage | 6th |

**Red border color indicates tournament was held on home soil.

== Staff ==
The following list shows the coaching staff for the Albanian national badminton team.

| Name | Role |
|---|---|
| (Albania) Mishel Pili | Head coach |

== Players ==
=== Current squad ===
As of 2 January 2024

==== Male players ====
| Name | DoB/Age | Ranking of event | | |
| Name | DoB/Age | MS | MD | XD |
|---|---|---|---|---|
| Antoni Kaso | 2000 (age 24–25) | – | – | – |
| Teodor Rrapo | 2002 (age 22–23) | – | – | – |
| Kostika Stoja | 2002 (age 22–23) | – | – | – |
| Eralb Lavdari | 2001 (age 23–24) | – | – | – |
| Klajdi Lavdari | 1999 (age 25–26) | – | – | – |
| Gjergji Pili | 18 September 2006 (age 19) | – | – | – |

==== Female players ====
| Name | DoB/Age | Ranking of event | | |
| Name | DoB/Age | WS | WD | XD |
|---|---|---|---|---|
| Esta Drenesku | 2002 (age 22–23) | – | – | – |
| Lea Kamburi | 2000 (age 24–25) | – | – | – |
| Joana Pili | 2002 (age 22–23) | – | – | – |
| Nasiola Teneqexhi | 2001 (age 23–24) | – | – | – |
| Sindi Xhengo | 2001 (age 23–24) | – | – | – |
| Fjojna Janko | 13 December 2006 (age 18) | – | – | – |
