= Julia Ackermann =

German swimmer (born 2007)

Personal information
- Nationality: German
- Born: 23 March 2007 (age 19)

Sport
- Country: Germany
- Sport: Swimming
- Strokes: Freestyle
Medal record
Women's swimming
Representing Germany
European Championships
Gold medal – first place	2026 Paris	Team open water
European Junior Championships
Bronze medal – third place	2022 Otopeni	800 m freestyle
Bronze medal – third place	2024 Vilnius	4x200 m freestyle
European Youth Olympic Festival
Gold medal – first place	2022 Banská Bystrica	400 m freestyle
Gold medal – first place	2022 Banská Bystrica	800 m freestyle
Bronze medal – third place	2022 Banská Bystrica	200 m freestyle
Bronze medal – third place	2022 Banská Bystrica	4×100 m freestyle

Julia Ackermann (born 23 March 2007) is a German swimmer.

== Career ==
In July 2026, she competed at the 2026 European Junior Open Water Swimming Championships and won a gold medal in the knockout sprint. The next month she competed at the 2026 European Aquatics Championships and won a gold medal in the mixed team relay with a time of 1:03:39.28.
