= 2022 European Youth Summer Olympic Festival =

2021 European Youth Summer Olympic Festival
- Host city: Banská Bystrica
- Country: Slovakia
- Motto: Ready to Shine
- Nations: 48
- Athletes: 2,253
- Sport: 10
- Events: 120
- Opening: July 24, 2022
- Closing: July 30, 2022
- Opened by: Boris Kollár
- Athlete's Oath: Alexandra Fričová
- Judge's Oath: Ľuboš Rupčík (Officials); Peter Jankovič (Coaches)
- Torch lighter: Anastasiya Kuzmina; Matej Tóth
- Main venue: SNP Stadium
- Website: eyof2022.com/en

Summer

Winter

The 2021 European Youth Summer Olympic Festival was held in Banská Bystrica, Slovakia, between 24 and 30 July 2022. The main reason it was played in 2022 was because it was postponed in 2021 due to COVID-19.

== Host selection ==
Košice was originally to be host city but withdrew from the hosting in April 2019 due to financial concerns. Banská Bystrica was chosen as the new host city in May 2019. Originally scheduled to run from 24 July to 1 August 2021, on 7 May 2020 it was announced that the games will be moved to 2022 as a result of the COVID-19 pandemic.

== Sports ==
The following competitions took place:

2022 European Youth Summer Olympic Festival Sports Programme
- Artistic gymnastics (15)
- Athletics (40)
- Badminton (3)
- Basketball (2)
- Cycling (4)
- Handball (2)
- Judo (17)
- Swimming (32)
- Tennis (3)
- Volleyball (2)

== Venues ==
Venue	Location	Sports	Capacity
Park close to the SNP Memorial	Banská Bystrica	Opening Ceremony	N/A
SNP Stadium	Banská Bystrica	Athletics	7,900
Badin Basketball Hall	Badín	Basketball	200
University Basketball Hall	Banská Bystrica	Basketball	200
Sports Park Badminton	Banská Bystrica	Badminton	50
City routes of Banská Bystrica	Banská Bystrica	Cycling	N/A
Sports Park Judo	Banská Bystrica	Judo	841
Handball Hall Detva	Detva	Handball	550
Handball Hall Zvolen	Zvolen	Handball	486
Sports park Swimming	Banská Bystrica	Swimming	400
Stadium of Artistic Gymnastics	Banská Bystrica	Artistic gymnastics	2,300
Sports Park Tennis	Banská Bystrica	Tennis	100
Volleyball Hall Slovenská Ľupča	Slovenská Ľupča	Volleyball	300
Volleyball Hall Zvolen	Zvolen	Volleyball	300

== Schedule ==
The competition schedule for the 2022 European Youth Olympic Summer Festival was as follows:

OC	Opening ceremony	1	Event finals	CC	Closing ceremony	●	Event competitions

July	24 Sun	25 Mon	26 Tue	27 Wed	28 Thu	29 Fri	30 Sat	Events
Ceremonies	OC						CC	
Artistic gymnastics			2	2	1	5	5	15
Athletics		1	7	5	9	13	5	40
Badminton		●	●	●	2	●	1	3
Basketball		●	●	●		●	2	2
Cycling			2			2		4
Handball		●	●	●		●	2	2
Judo			4	4	4	4	1	17
Swimming		2	8	6	5	11		32
Tennis		●	●	●	●	3		3
Volleyball		●	●	●		●	2	2
Total events		3	23	17	21	35	21	120
Cumulative total		3	26	43	64	102	120	120
July	24 Sun	25 Mon	26 Tue	27 Wed	28 Thu	29 Fri	30 Sat	Events

== Participant nations ==
A total of 2,252 athletes from 48 NOCs competed at these games. One refugee athlete, originally from Syria, and at that time based in Austria, also competed. As a result of the 2022 Russian invasion of Ukraine, on 2 March 2022, in accordance with a recommendation by the International Olympic Committee (IOC), EOC suspended the participation of Belarus and Russia from 2022 European Youth Summer Olympic Festival.

Participating National Olympic Committees
- Albania (11)
- Andorra (3)
- Armenia (19)
- Austria (47)
- Azerbaijan (33)
- Belgium (51)
- Bosnia and Herzegovina (7)
- Bulgaria (46)
- Croatia (76) (details)
- Cyprus (27)
- Czech Republic (72)
- Denmark (43)
- EOC Refugee Team (1)
- Estonia (40)
- Finland (56)
- France (84)
- (Georgia (country)) Georgia (28)
- Germany (127)
- (United Kingdom) Great Britain (40)
- Greece (46)
- Hungary (95)
- Iceland (38)
- (Republic of Ireland) Ireland (33)
- Israel (46)
- Italy (96)
- Kosovo (13)
- Latvia (34)
- Liechtenstein (2)
- Lithuania (55)
- Luxembourg (21)
- Malta (3)
- Moldova (19)
- Monaco (2)
- Montenegro (16)
- Netherlands (30)
- North Macedonia (3)
- Norway (30)
- Poland (95)
- Portugal (63)
- Romania (92)
- San Marino (5)
- Serbia (59)
- Slovakia (149)
- Slovenia (98)
- Spain (87)
- Sweden (26)
- Switzerland (34)
- Turkey (105)
- Ukraine (46)

== Medal table ==
* Host nation (Slovakia)

Rank	Nation	Gold	Silver	Bronze	Total
1	Italy	21	12	14	47
2	Germany	9	8	15	32
3	Spain	8	7	4	19
4	Great Britain	7	5	6	18
5	Hungary	6	9	9	24
6	France	6	7	4	17
7	Ukraine	6	6	6	18
8	Turkey	5	9	1	15
9	Romania	5	8	6	19
10	Poland	5	5	10	20
11	Croatia	5	4	0	9
11	Sweden	5	4	0	9
13	Lithuania	4	4	2	10
14	Israel	4	1	3	8
15	Czech Republic	3	5	6	14
16	Finland	3	1	3	7
16	Netherlands	3	1	3	7
18	Azerbaijan	2	4	2	8
19	Denmark	2	3	5	10
20	Serbia	2	3	1	6
21	Slovakia*	2	1	3	6
22	Greece	2	1	1	4
23	Georgia	2	0	6	8
24	Belgium	2	0	0	2
25	Switzerland	1	0	3	4
26	Slovenia	0	4	1	5
27	Bulgaria	0	3	3	6
28	Estonia	0	3	0	3
29	Portugal	0	1	4	5
30	Austria	0	1	3	4
31	Latvia	0	1	2	3
32	Cyprus	0	1	1	2
33	Armenia	0	0	3	3
34	Moldova	0	0	2	2
35	Bosnia and Herzegovina	0	0	1	1
35	Iceland	0	0	1	1
35	Ireland	0	0	1	1
35	Malta	0	0	1	1
35	Norway	0	0	1	1
Totals (39 entries)		120	122	137	379
