= Handball at the 2022 European Youth Summer Olympic Festival =

- Venue: Handball Hall Detva; Handball Hall Zvolen
- Date: 25–30 July 2022

Handball at the 2022 European Youth Summer Olympic Festival was held at the Handball Hall Detva in Detva, Slovakia and Handball Hall Zvolen in Zvolen, Slovakia from 25 to 30 July 2022.

== Medalists ==
Event	Gold	Silver	Bronze
Boys	Germany (GER)	Denmark (DEN)	Portugal (POR)
Girls	Hungary (HUN)	Denmark (DEN)	Norway (NOR)
