= Badín =

Badín Erdőbádony
- Municipality
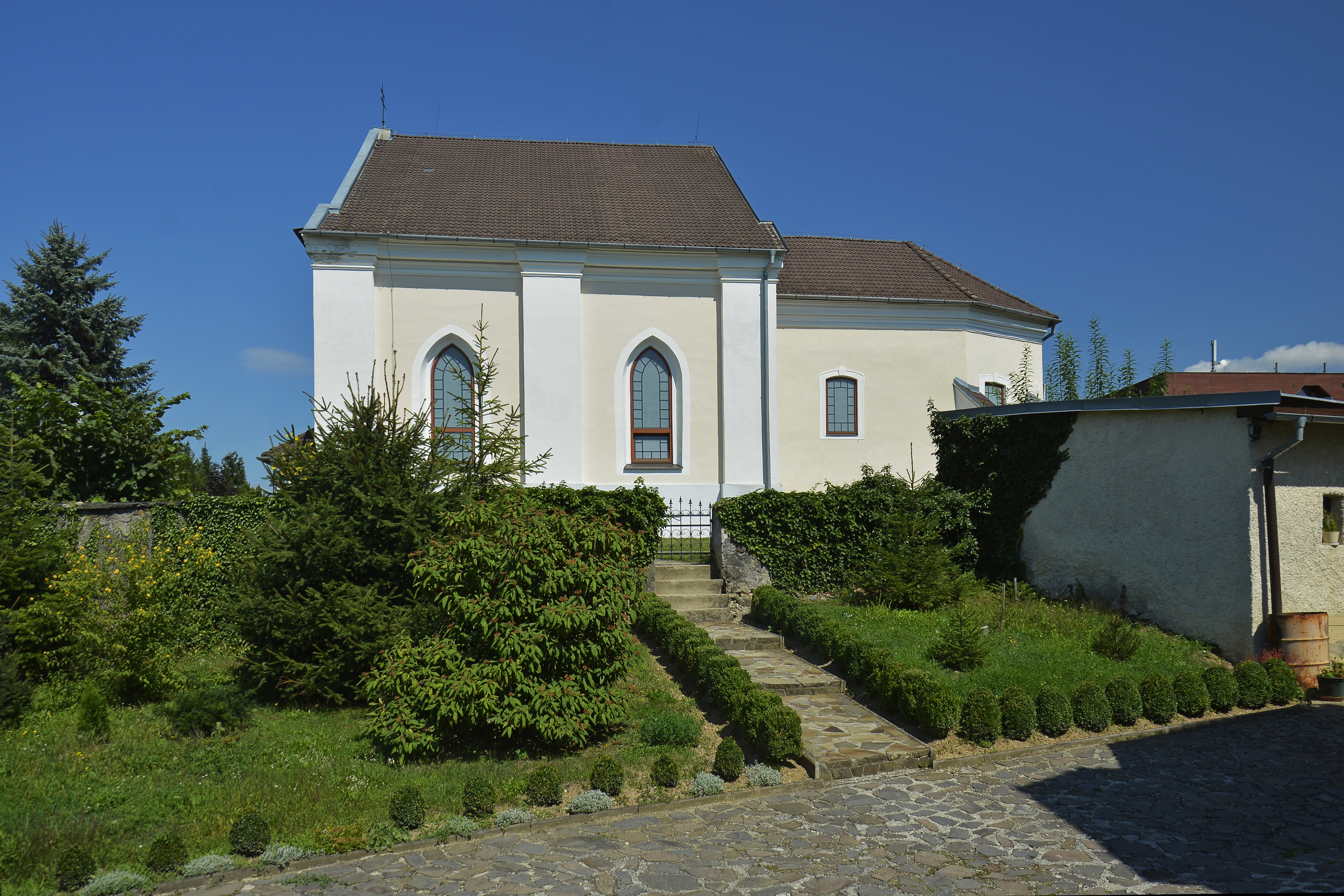
- Saint Catherine church

- Flag

- Location of Badín in the Banská Bystrica Region Location of Badín in Slovakia
- Coordinates: 48.67°N 19.11°E
- Country: Slovakia
- Region: Banská Bystrica Region
- District: Banská Bystrica District
- First mentioned: 1232

Government
  - Mayor: Pavol Hric

Area
  - Total: 34.38 km^{2} (13.27 sq mi)
- Elevation: 369 m (1,211 ft)

Population (2025)
  - Total: 2,163
- Time zone: UTC+1 (CET)
  - Summer (DST): UTC+2 (CEST)
- Postal code: 976 32
- Area code: +421 48
- Vehicle registration plate (until 2022): BB
- Website: www.obecbadin.sk

Badín (Hungarian: Erdőbádony) is a village and municipality in the Banská Bystrica District in the Banská Bystrica Region of central Slovakia. It is situated 13 km from the city of Banská Bystrica.

== Geography ==
The village lies at an altitude of 374 metres, however the altitude of the municipality ranges from 311 to 1,222 metres due to it being partly situated in the Kremnické vrchy mountains. The municipality covers an area of 34.38 km^{2}.

== Nature ==
Badín is best known for a primeval forest Badínsky prales, which has been strictly protected by the state against any human activity since 1913. It has an area of 30.70 hectares and additional 23.75 hectares are protected as a buffer zone. Dominant tree species are fir (Abies alba), beech (Fagus sylvatica), maple (Acer pseudoplatanus), ash (Fraxinus excelsior), and elm (Ulmus glabra). On average, fir threes achieve an age of 350–400 years and beech trees 210–230 years in Badínsky prales. The biggest living fir tree is 46 m tall with a stem diameter of 148 cm. Several dead trees that have already fallen down are even bigger. The local fauna, still partially unexplored, includes red deer, roe deer, boar, brown bear, lynx, wild cat, fox, and marten.

== Geography ==
The municipality lies at an altitude of 369 metres (1,211 ft) and covers an area of 34.38 km^{2} (13.27 sq mi) (2025).

== History ==
In historical records, the village was first mentioned in 1293. From 1580 to 1657 it had to pay tributes to the Ottoman Empire. In 1588, it was besieged by Turks. A lignite mine existed near the village from 1892 to the beginning of the 20th century. In 1944, the local population joined the anti-Nazi Slovak National Uprising and Badín became the headquarters of the 2nd Czechoslovak paratrooper brigade.

=== Seminary ===
A Catholic seminary was present in Badín from 1805 until its closure by the Communist regime in 1950. The seminary was reopened in 1990, first at Slovenská Ľupča castle and since 1993 in a newly constructed building directly in Badín by the bishop Rudolf Baláž. The modern seminary was named after the Saint Francis Xavier. In 2003 the seminary was visited by the Pope John Paul II. In 2019, the seminary was closed due to low number of students. The remaining about 20 students were transferred to a seminary in Nitra. The newly built seminary complex was built in a modern style and its chapter was decorated by the mosaic produced by Marko Rupnik.

== Sport ==
The village is represented in football by ŠK Badín, a team which currently plays in the 4. Liga central, the fourth league in Slovakia.

== Population ==
Population statistic (10 years)
| Year | 1995 | 2005 | 2015 | 2025 |
|---|---|---|---|---|
| Count | 1597 | 1714 | 1936 | 2163 |
| Difference | | +7.32% | +12.95% | +11.72% |

Population statistic
| Year | 2024 | 2025 |
|---|---|---|
| Count | 2152 | 2163 |
| Difference | | +0.51% |

It has a population of 2163 people (31 December 2025).

=== Ethnicity ===
Census 2021 (1+ %)
| Ethnicity | Number | Fraction |
|---|---|---|
| Slovak | 1956 | 96.44% |
| Not found out | 57 | 2.81% |
| Total | 2028 | |

In year 2021 was 2028 people by ethnicity 1956 as Slovak, 57 as Not found out, 15 as Romani, 13 as Other, 10 as Czech, 8 as Russian, 6 as Rusyn, 6 as Hungarian, 4 as German, 3 as Italian, 3 as English and 1 as Croatian.

Note on population: The difference values of population numbers in the table "Population statistic" and in the sections "Ethnicity" & "Religion" is caused by the use of various statistical methods.

=== Religion ===
Census 2021 (1+ %)
| Religion | Number | Fraction |
|---|---|---|
| Roman Catholic Church | 695 | 34.27% |
| None | 638 | 31.46% |
| Evangelical Church | 557 | 27.47% |
| Not found out | 72 | 3.55% |
| Greek Catholic Church | 23 | 1.13% |
| Total | 2028 | |

In year 2021 was 2028 people by religion 695 from Roman Catholic Church, 638 from None, 557 from Evangelical Church, 72 from Not found out, 23 from Greek Catholic Church, 10 from Seventh-day Adventist Church, 9 from Other, 5 from Christian Congregations in Slovakia, 5 from Ad hoc movements, 3 from Eastern Orthodox Church, 2 from Paganism and natural spirituality, 2 from Other and not ascertained christian church, 2 from Buddhism, 2 from Baptists Church, 1 from Jewish community, 1 from Calvinist Church and 1 from United Methodist Church.

== Genealogical resources ==
The records for genealogical research are available at the state archive in Banská Bystrica (Slovak: Štátny archív v Banskej Bystrici).

- Roman Catholic church records (births/marriages/deaths): 1725-1896 (parish A)
- Lutheran church records (births/marriages/deaths): 1761-1859 (parish B), 1860-1916 (parish A)
- Census records 1869 of Badin are not available at the state archive.

== See also ==
- List of municipalities and towns in Slovakia
