= Swimming at the 2024 Summer Olympics – Men's 100-metre backstroke =

Men's 100-metre backstroke at the Games of the XXXIII Olympiad
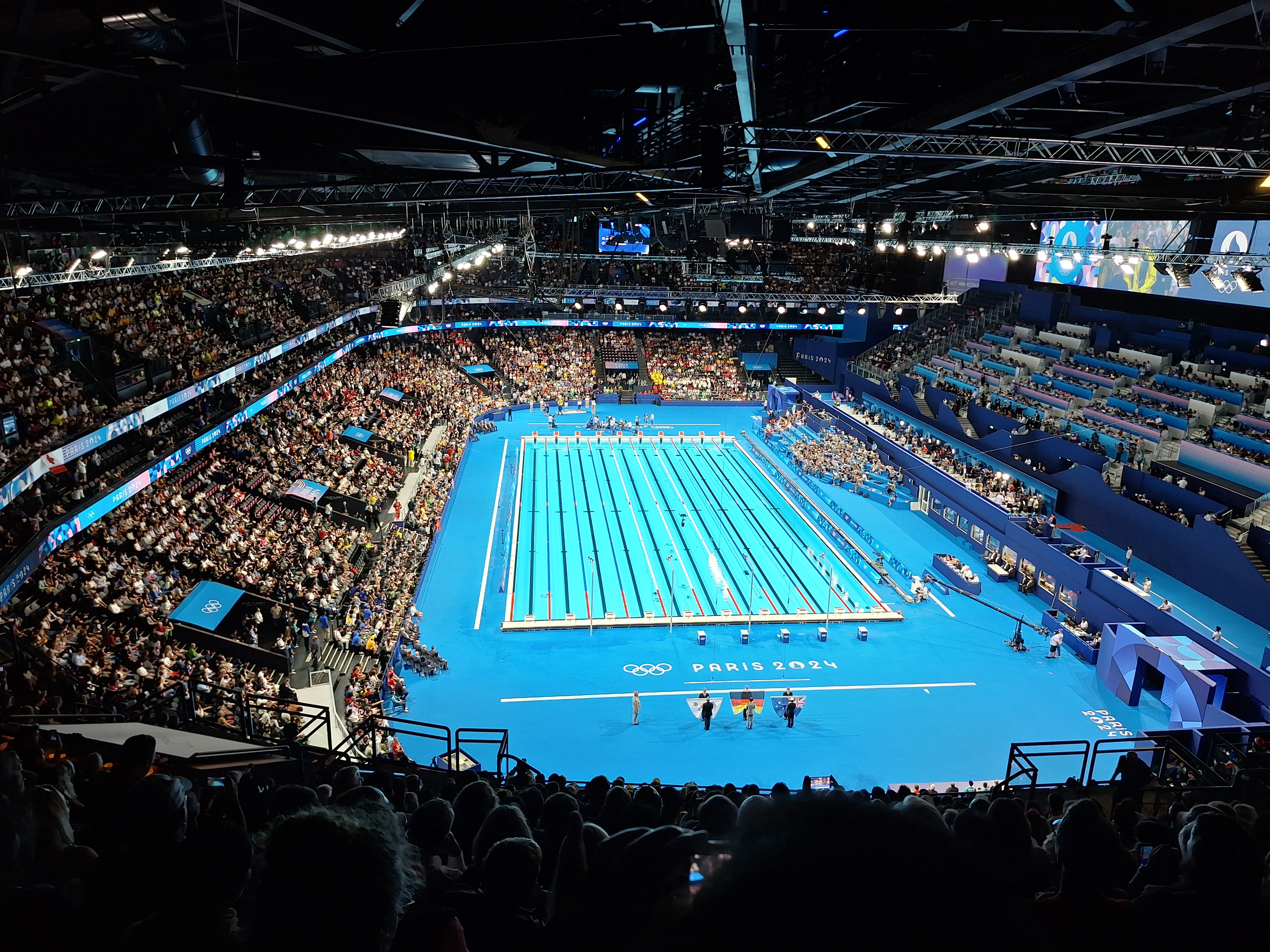
- Paris La Défense Arena after it was converted to a swimming pool for the swimming events
- Venue: Paris La Défense Arena
- Dates: 28 July 2024 (Heats and Semis); 29 July 2024 (Final)
- Competitors: 46 from 36 nations
- Winning time: 52.00

Medalists
1st place, gold medalist(s)		Thomas Ceccon	Italy
2nd place, silver medalist(s)		Xu Jiayu	China
3rd place, bronze medalist(s)		Ryan Murphy	United States

The men's 100-metre backstroke event at the 2024 Summer Olympics was held from 28 to 29 July 2024 at Paris La Défense Arena, which was converted to a swimming pool for the swimming events.

Italy's Thomas Ceccon, the US' Ryan Murphy, and Hunter Armstrong, also of the US, were the favourites going into the event. Ceccon ended up winning with at time of 52.00 seconds, ahead of China's Xu Jiayu in second and Murphy in third. His win gave Italy their first gold medal in the event.

The African record was broken twice by South Africa's Pieter Coetze in his semifinal and final, while Hungary's Hubert Kós broke his national record in the heats.

== Background ==
Italy's Thomas Ceccon won the event at the 2022 World Championships with a world record of 51.60, which had not been broken since. At the 2023 World Championships, the US' Ryan Murphy won gold ahead of Ceccon in second. Hunter Armstrong of the US placed in the top three at the 2022 and 2023 Championships, and won the event at the 2024 Championships in Ceccon and Murphy's absence. (Note: Several top swimmers chose not to attend the 2024 World Championships to focus on their Olympic training regime, and Ceccon withdrew in the lead up to the Championships due to a finger injury.) Other contenders included Xu Jiayu of China, the 2016 Olympic silver medallist and a double world champion; Hugo González of Spain, who swam a personal best of 52.70 at the 2024 Championships; and Apostolos Christou of Greece, who won the 2024 European Championships with a time of 52.23. SwimSwam predicted Ceccon would win the gold, while Swimming World predicted Murphy would win.

Defending Olympic champion Evgeny Rylov and defending Olympic silver medallist Kliment Kolesnikov, both from Russia, did not return to compete. World Aquatics required Russian athletes to have not shown any support for the Russian invasion of Ukraine to be able to compete as neutral athletes at the Games. Rylov had participated in a pro-war rally so was not eligible, and Kolesnikov said the conditions were "unacceptable" and chose not to compete.

The event was held at Paris La Défense Arena, which was converted to a swimming pool for the swimming events.

== Qualification ==
Each National Olympic Committee (NOC) was permitted to enter a maximum of two qualified athletes in each individual event, but only if both of them had attained the Olympic Qualifying Time (OQT). For this event, the OQT was 53.74 seconds. World Aquatics then considered athletes qualifying through universality; NOCs were given one event entry for each gender, which could be used by any athlete regardless of qualification time, providing the spaces had not already been taken by athletes from that nation who had achieved the OQT. Finally, the rest of the spaces were filled by athletes who had met the Olympic Consideration Time (OCT), which was 54.01 for this event. In total, 30 athletes qualified through achieving the OQT, 14 athletes qualified through universality places and two athletes qualified through achieving the OCT.

Top 10 fastest qualification times
Swimmer	Country	Time	Competition
Ryan Murphy	United States	52.04	2023 World Aquatics Championships
Xu Jiayu	China	52.05	2022 Asian Games
Thomas Ceccon	Italy	52.16	2023 World Aquatics Championships
Apostolos Christou	Greece	52.23	2024 European Championships
Hunter Armstrong	United States	52.33	2023 United States National Championships
Hugo González	Spain	52.70	2024 World Aquatics Championships
Oliver Morgan	Great Britain	52.70	2024 Aquatics GB Swimming Championships
Evangelos Makrygiannis	Greece	52.83	2024 European Championships
Yohann Ndoye-Brouard	France	52.84	2023 World Aquatics Championships
Mewen Tomac	France	52.86	2023 World Aquatics Championships

== Heats ==
Six heats (preliminary rounds) took place on 28 July 2024, starting at 11:43. (Note: All times are Central European Summer Time (UTC+2)) The swimmers with the best 16 times in the heats advanced to the semifinals. Hungary's Hubert Kós swam the fastest qualifying time of 52.78, which broke his own national record.

Results
Rank	Heat	Lane	Swimmer	Nation	Time	Notes
1	5	2	Hubert Kós	Hungary	52.78	Q, NR
2	5	6	Pieter Coetze	South Africa	52.90	Q
3	6	5	Apostolos Christou	Greece	52.95	Q
4	6	4	Ryan Murphy	United States	53.06	Q
5	4	6	Ksawery Masiuk	Poland	53.08	Q
6	4	3	Yohann Ndoye-Brouard	France	53.20	Q
6	5	4	Xu Jiayu	China	53.20	Q
8	5	3	Evangelos Makrygiannis	Greece	53.24	Q
9	5	5	Hunter Armstrong	United States	53.34	Q
10	4	2	Miroslav Knedla	Czech Republic	53.41	Q
11	6	3	Oliver Morgan	Great Britain	53.44	Q
12	4	4	Thomas Ceccon	Italy	53.45	Q
13	6	6	Mewen Tomac	France	53.51	Q
14	4	5	Hugo González	Spain	53.68	Q
15	6	8	Blake Tierney	Canada	53.89	Q
16	6	2	Jonathon Marshall	Great Britain	53.93	Q
17	6	7	Roman Mityukov	Switzerland	53.94	
18	4	1	Ole Braunschweig	Germany	53.95	
19	5	7	Ádám Jászó	Hungary	53.97	
20	4	8	Javier Acevedo	Canada	54.19	
21	3	1	Kai van Westering	Netherlands	54.21	
21	5	1	Isaac Cooper	Australia	54.21	
23	4	7	Michele Lamberti	Italy	54.22	
24	3	7	Oleksandr Zheltyakov	Ukraine	54.32	
25	6	1	Bradley Woodward	Australia	54.34	
26	3	5	Thierry Bollin	Switzerland	54.35	
27	2	8	Maximillian Wilson	Virgin Islands	54.49	
28	3	4	Adam Maraana	Israel	54.61	
29	3	6	Marek Ulrich	Germany	54.63	
30	5	8	Lee Ju-ho	South Korea	54.65	
31	3	2	Riku Matsuyama	Japan	54.71	
32	3	3	João Costa	Portugal	54.90	
33	2	3	Srihari Nataraj	India	55.01	
33	2	4	Kane Follows	New Zealand	55.01	
35	3	8	Ulises Saravia	Argentina	55.03	
36	2	6	Bernhard Reitshammer	Austria	55.13	
37	2	2	Anthony Rincón	Colombia	55.42	
38	2	1	Yeziel Morales	Puerto Rico	55.76	
39	1	4	Jack Harvey	Bermuda	55.78	
40	2	5	Berke Saka	Turkey	55.85	
41	2	7	Noe Pantskhava	Georgia	56.46	
42	1	3	Alexis Kpadi	Benin	57.61	NR
43	1	5	Yazan Al-Bawwab	Palestine	58.26	
44	1	6	Zackary Gresham	Grenada	58.92	
45	1	7	Zeke Chan	Brunei	1:00.38	
46	1	2	Alan Uhi	Tonga	1:00.62	

== Semifinals ==
Two semifinals took place on 28 July, starting at 21:32. The swimmers with the best eight times in the semifinals advanced to the final. Ceccon won the first heat with 52.58, qualifying second, while Xu won the second heat and qualified with the fastest time of 52.02. Xu's swim was swimming at the same speed as Ceccon's world record at the turn, but it extended ahead of him on the final 50 metres. Armstrong and Kós both did not qualify. South Africa's Pieter Coetze qualified with a new African record of 52.63, which beat his previous record by 0.15 seconds.

Results
Rank	Heat	Lane	Swimmer	Nation	Time	Notes
1	2	6	Xu Jiayu	China	52.02	Q
2	1	7	Thomas Ceccon	Italy	52.58	Q
3	1	3	Yohann Ndoye-Brouard	France	52.63	Q
3	1	4	Pieter Coetze	South Africa	52.63	Q, AF
5	1	5	Ryan Murphy	United States	52.72	Q
6	2	5	Apostolos Christou	Greece	52.77	Q
7	2	7	Oliver Morgan	Great Britain	52.85	Q
8	1	1	Hugo González	Spain	52.95	Q
9	1	6	Evangelos Makrygiannis	Greece	52.97	
10	2	4	Hubert Kós	Hungary	52.98	
11	2	2	Hunter Armstrong	United States	53.11	
12	1	2	Miroslav Knedla	Czech Republic	53.44	
13	2	3	Ksawery Masiuk	Poland	53.44	
14	1	8	Jonathon Marshall	Great Britain	53.46	
15	2	1	Mewen Tomac	France	53.63	
16	2	8	Blake Tierney	Canada	53.71	

== Final ==
The final took place at 21:27 on 29 July. Jiayu swam the fastest opening half of the race in 24.88 seconds, and he was the only swimmer to swim the first half in under 25 seconds. His closing 50 metre split was the slowest in the field, but he held on to win the silver medal with a time of 52.32. Ceccon was third at the 50 metre mark, but swam the fastest closing 50 metres to win gold with 52.00. Murphy won bronze with 52.39, which was 0.02 seconds ahead of Christou in fourth. Coetze broke his African record again with 52.58, placing him in fifth.

After the swim Ceccon said he had changed his "tactical approach" since losing to Murphy at the 2023 Championships, and that his swim was "proof that sometimes you can lose, but you can learn from that". His win gave Italy their first gold medal in the event.

Results
Rank	Lane	Swimmer	Nation	Time	Notes
1st place, gold medalist(s)	5	Thomas Ceccon	Italy	52.00	
2nd place, silver medalist(s)	4	Xu Jiayu	China	52.32	
3rd place, bronze medalist(s)	2	Ryan Murphy	United States	52.39	
4	7	Apostolos Christou	Greece	52.41	
5	6	Pieter Coetze	South Africa	52.58	AF
6	8	Hugo González	Spain	52.73	
7	3	Yohann Ndoye-Brouard	France	52.77	
8	1	Oliver Morgan	Great Britain	52.84	

Statistics
Name	15 metre split (s)	50 metre split (s)	50–65 metre split (s)	Time (s)	Stroke rate (strokes/min)
Thomas Ceccon	6.00	25.10	7.05	52.00	45.1
Xu Jiayu	5.68	24.88	6.92	52.32	48.1
Ryan Murphy	5.69	25.04	6.71	52.39	48.7
Apostolos Christou	6.08	25.21	6.93	52.41	47.0
Pieter Coetze	6.09	25.37	7.34	52.58	50.5
Hugo González	6.21	25.52	7.34	52.73	49.8
Yohann Ndoye-Brouard	5.98	25.37	6.92	52.77	51.3
Oliver Morgan	6.16	25.50	7.22	52.84	50.3
