= Swimming at the 2026 European Aquatics Championships – Men's 100 metre backstroke =

Men's 100 metre backstroke at the 2026 European Aquatics Championships
- Venue: Sports Centre Milan Gale Muškatirović
- Dates: 15 August(heats and semifinals); 16 August (final)
- Competitors: 66 from 34 nations
- Winning time: 52.27

Medalists
| gold medal | Apostolos Christou | Greece |
| silver medal | Thomas Ceccon | Italy |
| bronze medal | Pavel Samusenko |

The Men's 100 metre backstroke competition of the 2026 European Aquatics Championships was held on 15 and 16 August 2026.

== Records ==
Prior to the competition, the existing world, European and championship records were as follows.

| | Name | Nationality | Time | Location | Date |
|---|---|---|---|---|---|
| World record | Thomas Ceccon | Italy | 51.60 | Budapest | 20 June 2022 |
| European record | Thomas Ceccon | Italy | 51.60 | Budapest | 20 June 2022 |
| Championship record | Camille Lacourt | France | 52.11 | Budapest | 10 August 2010 |

== Results ==
=== Heats ===
The heats were started on 15 August at 10:01.
Qualification Rules: The 16 fastest from the heats qualify to the semifinals.

| Rank | Heat | Lane | Swimmer | Country | Time | Notes |
|---|---|---|---|---|---|---|
| 1 | 7 | 3 | Apostolos Christou | Greece | 52.73 | Q |
| 2 | 7 | 6 | Mewen Tomac | France | 52.94 | Q |
| 3 | 5 | 3 | Pavel Samusenko | Neutral Athletes B | 52.96 | Q |
| 4 | 6 | 4 | Yohann Ndoye-Brouard | France | 53.05 | Q |
| 5 | 7 | 2 | Georgii Iakovlev | Neutral Athletes B | 53.15 | Q |
| 6 | 7 | 5 | Kliment Kolesnikov | Neutral Athletes B | 53.16 | |
| 7 | 5 | 8 | Tomer Shuster | Israel | 53.39 | Q |
| 8 | 7 | 4 | Thomas Ceccon | Italy | 53.51 | Q |
| 9 | 5 | 2 | Iván Martínez | Spain | 53.67 | Q |
| 10 | 5 | 7 | Matthew Ward | Great Britain | 53.73 | Q |
| 11 | 7 | 1 | Jack Skerry | Great Britain | 53.76 | Q |
| 12 | 6 | 5 | Roman Mityukov | Switzerland | 53.78 | Q |
| 12 | 7 | 9 | Robert Falborg Pedersen | Denmark | 53.78 | Q, NR |
| 14 | 5 | 5 | Oliver Morgan | Great Britain | 53.91 | |
| 15 | 6 | 2 | Kaii Winkler | Germany | 53.92 | Q |
| 16 | 6 | 0 | Cornelius Jahn | Germany | 53.98 | Q |
| 16 | 6 | 3 | Ksawery Masiuk | Poland | 53.98 | Q |
| 18 | 5 | 0 | Denis Popescu | Romania | 54.04 | Q |
| 19 | 7 | 7 | Georgii Smirnov | Neutral Athletes B | 54.11 | |
| 20 | 4 | 1 | Inbar Ono Danziger | Israel | 54.13 | |
| 21 | 6 | 7 | Evangelos Makrygiannis | Greece | 54.17 | |
| 22 | 6 | 1 | Nathan Muratory | France | 54.19 | |
| 22 | 5 | 6 | John Shortt | Ireland | 54.19 | |
| 24 | 4 | 5 | Luke Greenbank | Great Britain | 54.24 | |
| 25 | 4 | 6 | Artsiom Yarmak | Neutral Athletes A | 54.28 | |
| 26 | 3 | 3 | Luka Čarapović | Croatia | 54.44 | NR |
| 27 | 5 | 1 | Noah Verreth | Belgium | 54.45 | |
| 28 | 4 | 7 | Aukan Goldin | Israel | 54.53 | |
| 29 | 6 | 8 | Michele Lamberti | Italy | 54.58 | |
| 30 | 3 | 2 | Flavio Bucca | Switzerland | 54.61 | |
| 31 | 4 | 9 | Max Halbeisen | Austria | 54.62 | |
| 32 | 7 | 0 | Francesco Lazzari | Italy | 54.72 | |
| 33 | 4 | 3 | Aleksander Styś | Poland | 54.87 | |
| 34 | 3 | 6 | Lukas Edl | Austria | 54.92 | |
| 34 | 6 | 9 | Uladzimir Mamekin | Neutral Athletes A | 54.92 | |
| 36 | 3 | 4 | Bernhard Reitshammer | Austria | 54.96 | |
| 37 | 3 | 5 | Alexandru Constantinescu | Romania | 55.02 | |
| 38 | 4 | 4 | Daniele Del Signore | Italy | 55.17 | |
| 39 | 3 | 1 | Filip Kosinski | Poland | 55.19 | |
| 40 | 6 | 6 | Miroslav Knedla | Czech Republic | 55.36 | |
| 41 | 4 | 8 | Zsombor Rácz | Hungary | 55.46 | |
| 42 | 3 | 8 | Tudor Iordache | Romania | 55.58 | |
| 43 | 2 | 0 | Dominik Grudinskij | Lithuania | 55.61 | |
| 44 | 3 | 0 | Giovanni Phillipson | Netherlands | 55.64 | |
| 45 | 2 | 3 | Rufus Maria Bernhardt | Liechtenstein | 55.71 | |
| 46 | 4 | 0 | Jakub Jan Krischke | Czech Republic | 55.76 | |
| 47 | 2 | 4 | Michael Laitarovsky | Israel | 56.00 | |
| 48 | 2 | 5 | Ajjuub Ezzat | Finland | 56.01 | |
| 49 | 1 | 4 | Kristians Brencs | Latvia | 56.05 | |
| 50 | 5 | 9 | Mantas Kauspedas | Lithuania | 56.08 | |
| 51 | 2 | 1 | Guðmundur Leo Rafnsson | Iceland | 56.13 | |
| 52 | 2 | 7 | Vidar Carlbaum | Sweden | 56.14 | |
| 53 | 1 | 3 | Kenan Dračić | Bosnia and Herzegovina | 56.17 | NR |
| 54 | 1 | 5 | Ricardo Santos | Portugal | 56.20 | |
| 55 | 2 | 6 | Primož Šenica Pavletič | Slovenia | 56.31 | |
| 56 | 3 | 7 | Noe Pantskhava | Georgia | 56.38 | |
| 57 | 2 | 9 | Charlie Skoglund Macmillan | Sweden | 56.49 | |
| 58 | 2 | 2 | Nikolass Deičmans | Latvia | 56.63 | |
| 59 | 2 | 8 | Leon Opatril | Austria | 56.73 | |
| 59 | 3 | 9 | Daren Kirilov | Bulgaria | 56.73 | |
| 61 | 1 | 7 | Lars Kuljus | Estonia | 56.95 | |
| 62 | 1 | 6 | Roope Koskela | Finland | 57.37 | |
| 63 | 1 | 2 | Dmitri Sillaste | Estonia | 57.93 | |
| 64 | 1 | 1 | Ronens Kermans | Latvia | 58.39 | |
| 65 | 1 | 0 | Gevorg Tonoyan | Armenia | 1:00.35 | |
| 66 | 1 | 8 | Arion Budima | Kosovo | 1:01.26 | |
| | 7 | 8 | Hugo González | Spain | Did not start | |
| | 5 | 4 | Hubert Kós | Hungary | Did not start | |
| | 4 | 2 | Ole Braunschweig | Germany | Did not start | |

=== Semifinals ===
The semifinals were started on 15 August at 20:18.
Qualification Rules: The first 2 competitors of each semifinal and the remaining fastest (up to a total of 8 qualified competitors) from the semifinals advance to the final.

| Rank | Heat | Lane | Name | Nationality | Time | Notes |
|---|---|---|---|---|---|---|
| 1 | 2 | 3 | Georgii Iakovlev | Neutral Athletes B | 52.89 | Q |
| 2 | 2 | 6 | Thomas Ceccon | Italy | 52.93 | Q |
| 3 | 2 | 4 | Apostolos Christou | Greece | 52.94 | Q |
| 4 | 2 | 5 | Pavel Samusenko | Neutral Athletes B | 53.12 | Q |
| 5 | 1 | 5 | Yohann Ndoye-Brouard | France | 53.16 | Q |
| 6 | 1 | 4 | Mewen Tomac | France | 53.17 | Q |
| 7 | 1 | 2 | Jack Skerry | Great Britain | 53.21 | Q |
| 8 | 2 | 8 | Ksawery Masiuk | Poland | 53.24 | Q |
| 9 | 1 | 3 | Tomer Shuster | Israel | 53.48 | |
| 10 | 1 | 7 | Roman Mityukov | Switzerland | 53.57 | |
| 11 | 1 | 6 | Iván Martínez | Spain | 53.61 | |
| 12 | 2 | 2 | Matthew Ward | Great Britain | 53.65 | |
| 13 | 2 | 7 | Robert Falborg Pedersen | Denmark | 53.71 | NR |
| 14 | 1 | 1 | Cornelius Jahn | Germany | 53.84 | |
| 15 | 2 | 1 | Kaii Winkler | Germany | 53.89 | |
| 16 | 1 | 8 | Denis Popescu | Romania | 54.27 | |

=== Final ===
The final was held on 16 August at 19:06.

| Rank | Lane | Name | Nationality | Time | Notes |
|---|---|---|---|---|---|
| 1st place, gold medalist(s) | 3 | Apostolos Christou | Greece | 52.27 | |
| 2nd place, silver medalist(s) | 5 | Thomas Ceccon | Italy | 52.28 | |
| 3rd place, bronze medalist(s) | 6 | Pavel Samusenko | Neutral Athletes B | 52.57 | |
| 4 | 2 | Yohann Ndoye-Brouard | France | 52.71 | |
| 5 | 4 | Georgii Iakovlev | Neutral Athletes B | 52.73 | |
| 6 | 8 | Ksawery Masiuk | Poland | 52.92 | |
| 7 | 7 | Mewen Tomac | France | 53.47 | |
| 8 | 1 | Jack Skerry | Great Britain | 53.65 | |
