= Swimming at the 2026 European Aquatics Championships – Men's 50 metre backstroke =

Men's 50 metre backstroke at the 2026 European Aquatics Championships
- Venue: Paris Aquatic Centre
- Dates: 13 August (heats and semifinals); 14 August (final)
- Competitors: 72 from 33 nations
- Winning time: 24.11

Medalists
gold medal	Miroslav Knedla	Czech Republic
silver medal	Kliment Kolesnikov
bronze medal	Pavel Samusenko

The Men's 50 metre backstroke competition of the 2026 European Aquatics Championships was held on 13 and 14 August 2026.

== Records ==
Prior to the competition, the existing world, European and championship records were as follows.

	Name	Nationality	Time	Location	Date
World record	Kliment Kolesnikov	Russia	23.55	Kazan	27 July 2023
European record	Kliment Kolesnikov	Russia	23.55	Kazan	27 July 2023
Championship record	Kliment Kolesnikov	Russia	23.80	Budapest	18 May 2021

== Results ==
=== Heats ===
The heats were started on 13 August at 10:19.

Ranks	Heats	Lane	Swimmer	Country	Time	Notes
1	8	4	Kliment Kolesnikov	Neutral Athletes B	24.12	Q
2	7	4	Pavel Samusenko	Neutral Athletes B	24.13	Q
3	7	3	Miroslav Knedla	Czech Republic	24.19	Q, NR
4	8	3	Ksawery Masiuk	Poland	24.46	Q
5	7	5	Georgii Iakovlev	Neutral Athletes B	24.47	
6	6	5	Apostolos Christou	Greece	24.52	Q
7	8	2	Robert Falborg Pedersen	Denmark	24.55	Q, NR
8	8	5	Michele Lamberti	Italy	24.56	Q
9	6	3	Hubert Kós	Hungary	24.57	Q
10	7	0	Tomer Shuster	Israel	24.62	Q
11	7	6	Yohann Ndoye-Brouard	France	24.65	Q
12	6	7	Ralf Tribuntsov	Estonia	24.66	Q
13	4	8	Rémi Fabiani	Luxembourg	24.73	Q
14	8	0	Thomas Ceccon	Italy	24.75	Q
15	7	7	Iván Martínez	Spain	24.88	Q
16	6	2	Ole Braunschweig	Germany	24.90	QSO
16	6	4	Oliver Morgan	Great Britain	24.90	QSO
16	6	6	Jack Skerry	Great Britain	24.90	QSO
19	8	1	Mewen Tomac	France	24.94	
20	8	6	Mantas Kaušpėdas	Lithuania	24.95	
21	3	4	Hugo González	Spain	24.96	
22	7	2	Francesco Lazzari	Italy	24.98	
23	8	7	Adrián Santos	Spain	25.06	
24	7	1	Aleksei Tkachev	Neutral Athletes B	25.09	
25	5	4	John Shortt	Ireland	25.11	
25	7	9	Artsiom Yarmak	Neutral Athletes A	25.11	
27	5	3	Michael Laitarovsky	Israel	25.14	
28	6	8	Matthew Ward	Great Britain	25.18	
29	6	0	Denis Popescu	Romania	25.19	
30	3	8	Jan Čejka	Czech Republic	25.25	
30	7	8	Jakub Jan Krischke	Czech Republic	25.25	
32	5	6	Evangelos Makrygiannis	Greece	25.27	
33	5	1	Lukas Edl	Austria	25.29	
34	4	3	Rufus Bernhardt	Liechtenstein	25.30	
35	3	2	Inbar Ono Danziger	Israel	25.36	
35	3	3	Luka Čarapović	Croatia	25.36	NR
35	3	6	Max Halbeisen	Austria	25.36	
35	6	9	Thierry Bollin	Switzerland	25.36	
39	5	2	Noah Verreth	Belgium	25.39	
40	8	9	Uladzimir Mamekin	Neutral Athletes A	25.40	
41	4	7	Vidar Carlbaum	Sweden	25.42	
42	4	5	Nikola Aćin	Serbia	25.43	
43	5	5	Noe Pantskhava	Georgia	25.46	
43	5	8	Giovanni Phillipson	Netherlands	25.46	
45	6	1	Aleksander Styś	Poland	25.47	
46	4	4	Rio Daodu	Great Britain	25.51	
47	4	0	Tomasz Polewka	Poland	25.54	
48	5	9	Daniel Zaitsev	Estonia	25.55	
49	4	9	Leon Opatril	Austria	25.58	
49	5	7	Roman Mityukov	Switzerland	25.58	
51	3	7	Aukan Goldin	Israel	25.62	
52	8	8	Daniele Del Signore	Italy	25.73	
53	4	2	Szymon Mróz	Poland	25.77	
54	3	1	Frederik Lentz	Denmark	25.79	
55	4	6	Bernhard Reitshammer	Austria	25.83	
56	3	5	Nikodim Markovic	Netherlands	25.84	
56	5	0	Fritz Dietz	Germany	25.84	
58	2	4	Tudor Iordache	Romania	25.87	
58	2	7	Ronny Brännkärr	Finland	25.87	
60	2	5	Kristians Brenčs	Latvia	25.97	
61	3	0	Alexandru Constantinescu	Romania	25.98	
62	3	9	Roope Koskela	Finland	26.04	
63	2	3	Ārons Roderts	Latvia	26.07	
64	2	2	Ajjuub Ezzat	Finland	26.15	
65	1	4	Guðmundur Leo Rafnsson	Iceland	26.19	
65	2	6	Flavio Bucca	Switzerland	26.19	
67	2	8	Daren Kirilov	Bulgaria	26.23	
68	2	9	Emīls Krampe	Latvia	26.30	
69	2	1	Dominik Grudinskij	Lithuania	26.33	
70	2	0	Nikolass Deičmans	Latvia	26.72	
71	1	5	Zhulian Lavdaniti	Albania	27.29	
72	1	3	Gevorg Tonoyan	Armenia	27.49	
	4	1	Cornelius Jahn	Germany	Did not start	

=== Swim-off ===
The swim-off was held on 13 August at 12:03.

Rank	Lane	Swimmer	Nation	Time	Notes
1	3	Oliver Morgan	Great Britain	24.63	Q
2	4	Jack Skerry	Great Britain	24.75	Q
3	5	Ole Braunschweig	Germany	24.81	

=== Semifinals ===
The semifinals were started on 13 August at 19:00.

Rank	Heat	Lane	Swimmer	Nation	Time	Notes
1	1	4	Pavel Samusenko	Neutral Athletes B	24.03	Q
2	2	4	Kliment Kolesnikov	Neutral Athletes B	24.14	Q
3	2	5	Miroslav Knedla	Czech Republic	24.20	Q
4	2	2	Tomer Shuster	Israel	24.36	Q
5	1	1	Iván Martínez	Spain	24.40	Q, NR
6	1	2	Yohann Ndoye-Brouard	France	24.43	Q
7	2	3	Apostolos Christou	Greece	24.44	Q
8	2	1	Thomas Ceccon	Italy	24.45	Q
9	1	5	Ksawery Masiuk	Poland	24.47	
10	2	6	Michele Lamberti	Italy	24.57	
11	1	3	Robert Falborg Pedersen	Denmark	24.60	
12	1	8	Oliver Morgan	Great Britain	24.63	
13	2	7	Ralf Tribuntsov	Estonia	24.69	
14	1	6	Hubert Kós	Hungary	24.73	
15	2	8	Jack Skerry	Great Britain	24.82	
16	1	7	Rémi Fabiani	Luxembourg	24.96	

=== Final ===
The final was held on 14 August at 19:51.

Rank	Lane	Swimmer	Nation	Time	Notes
1st place, gold medalist(s)	3	Miroslav Knedla	Czech Republic	24.11	NR
2nd place, silver medalist(s)	5	Kliment Kolesnikov	Neutral Athletes B	24.12	
3rd place, bronze medalist(s)	4	Pavel Samusenko	Neutral Athletes B	24.14	
4	1	Apostolos Christou	Greece	24.15	
5	6	Tomer Shuster	Israel	24.44	
6	2	Iván Martínez	Spain	24.49	
7	8	Thomas Ceccon	Italy	24.54	
8	7	Yohann Ndoye-Brouard	France	24.65	
