= 2021 European Short Course Swimming Championships =

Water sport competitions

- Host city: Kazan, Russia
- Date: 2–7 November
- Venue: Palace of Water Sports
- Events: 42

The 2021 European Short Course Swimming Championships (25 m) were held in Kazan, Russia, from 2 to 7 November 2021 at the Palace of Water Sports.

== Medal table ==
* Host nation (Russia)

Rank	Nation	Gold	Silver	Bronze	Total
1	Russia*	11	5	8	24
2	Netherlands	8	5	5	18
3	Italy	7	18	10	35
4	Sweden	4	1	1	6
5	Hungary	3	1	1	5
6	Poland	2	2	4	8
7	Belarus	2	2	0	4
8	Greece	1	2	2	5
9	Germany	1	1	4	6
10	Romania	1	1	1	3
10	Turkey	1	1	1	3
12	Israel	1	0	0	1
13	France	0	1	1	2
14	Czech Republic	0	1	0	1
14	Denmark	0	1	0	1
14	Estonia	0	1	0	1
14	Serbia	0	1	0	1
14	Switzerland	0	1	0	1
19	Austria	0	0	2	2
20	Slovenia	0	0	1	1
Totals (20 entries)		42	45	41	128

== Trophy ==
Rank	Team	Points
1	Italy	1073
2	Russia	1051
3	Netherlands	580
4	Sweden	365
5	Poland	328
6	Turkey	301
7	Hungary	296
8	Austria	272
9	Germany	233
10	Czech Republic	192

Rank	Team	Points
11	Norway	179
12	Finland	163
13	Denmark	154
14	Belarus	149
15	France	137
16	Greece	135
17	Spain	134
18	Israel	119
19	Romania	81
20	Switzerland	69

== Results ==
=== Men's events ===
Event	Gold		Silver		Bronze	
50 m freestyle	Szebasztián Szabó; Hungary	20.72	Lorenzo Zazzeri; Italy	20.84	Paweł Juraszek; Poland Vladimir Morozov; Russia	20.95
100 m freestyle	Kliment Kolesnikov; Russia	45.58	Alessandro Miressi; Italy	45.84	Vladislav Grinev; Russia	46.06
200 m freestyle	David Popovici; Romania	1:42.12	Luc Kroon; Netherlands	1:42.20	Stan Pijnenburg; Netherlands	1:42.51
400 m freestyle	Luc Kroon; Netherlands	3:38.33	Matteo Ciampi; Italy	3:38.58	Marco De Tullio; Italy	3:38.80
800 m freestyle	Gregorio Paltrinieri; Italy	7:27.94; CR	Florian Wellbrock; Germany	7:27.99	Sven Schwarz; Germany	7:33.85
1500 m freestyle	Florian Wellbrock; Germany	14:09.88	Gregorio Paltrinieri; Italy	14:13.07	Sven Schwarz; Germany	14:26.24
50 m backstroke	Kliment Kolesnikov; Russia	22.47; CR	Michele Lamberti; Italy	22.65	Robert Glință; Romania	22.74
100 m backstroke	Kliment Kolesnikov; Russia	49.13	Robert Glință; Romania	49.31	Apostolos Christou; Greece	49.87
200 m backstroke	Radosław Kawęcki; Poland	1:48.46	Lorenzo Mora; Italy	1:49.73	Michele Lamberti; Italy	1:50.26
50 m breaststroke	Ilya Shymanovich; Belarus	25.25 =WR	Hüseyin Emre Sakçı; Turkey	25.39	Nicolò Martinenghi; Italy	25.54
100 m breaststroke	Nicolò Martinenghi; Italy	55.63	Ilya Shymanovich; Belarus	55.77	Arno Kamminga; Netherlands	55.79
200 m breaststroke	Ilya Shymanovich; Belarus	2:01.73	Arno Kamminga; Netherlands	2:01.74	Mikhail Dorinov; Russia	2:02.07
50 m butterfly	Szebasztián Szabó; Hungary	21.75 =WR	Matteo Rivolta; Italy	22.14	Thomas Ceccon; Italy	22.24
100 m butterfly	Szebasztián Szabó; Hungary	49.68	Michele Lamberti; Italy	49.79	Jakub Majerski; Poland	49.86
200 m butterfly	Alberto Razzetti; Italy	1.50.24	Kristóf Milák; Hungary	1:51.11	Egor Pavlov; Russia	1:51.81
100 m individual medley	Marco Orsi; Italy	50.95	Andreas Vazaios; Greece	51.72	Bernhard Reitshammer; Austria	51.91
200 m individual medley	Andreas Vazaios; Greece	1.51.70	Thomas Ceccon; Italy	1.52.49	Alberto Razzetti; Italy	1.52.75
400 m individual medley	Ilya Borodin; Russia	3:58.83; WJR	Alberto Razzetti; Italy	4:00.34	Hubert Kós; Hungary	4:03.16
4 × 50 m freestyle relay	Netherlands; Jesse Puts (21.10); Stan Pijnenburg (20.74); Kenzo Simons (20.59); Thom de Boer (20.46)	1:22.89	Italy; Alessandro Miressi (21.20); Thomas Ceccon (20.82); Lorenzo Zazzeri (20.24); Marco Orsi (20.66)	1:22.92	Russia; Vladimir Morozov (21.22); Vladislav Grinev (20.69); Evgeny Rylov (20.99); Kliment Kolesnikov (20.45)	1:23.35
4 × 50 m medley relay	Italy; Michele Lamberti (22.62); Nicolò Martinenghi (25.14); Marco Orsi (22.17); Lorenzo Zazzeri (20.21); Lorenzo Mora; Federico Poggio; Thomas Ceccon; Leonardo Deplano	1:30.14; WR	Russia; Kliment Kolesnikov (22.58); Oleg Kostin (25.51); Vladimir Morozov (22.18); Vladislav Grinev (20.52); Pavel Samusenko; Danil Semyaninov; Daniil Markov; Sergey Fesikov	1:30.79	Netherlands; Stan Pijnenburg (23.80); Arno Kamminga (25.48); Jesse Puts (22.56); Thom de Boer (20.32)	1:32.16

=== Women's events ===
Event	Gold		Silver		Bronze	
50 m freestyle	Sarah Sjöström; Sweden	23.12; CR	Katarzyna Wasick; Poland	23.49	Maria Kameneva; Russia	23.72
100 m freestyle	Sarah Sjöström; Sweden	51.26	Katarzyna Wasick; Poland	51.58	Marrit Steenbergen; Netherlands	51.92
200 m freestyle	Marrit Steenbergen; Netherlands	1:52.75	Barbora Seemanova; Czech Republic	1:53.58	Katja Fain; Slovenia	1:53.88
400 m freestyle	Anastasiya Kirpichnikova; Russia	3:59.18	Anna Egorova; Russia	4:00.52	Isabel Marie Gose; Germany	4:01.37
800 m freestyle	Anastasiya Kirpichnikova; Russia	8:04.65	Simona Quadarella; Italy	8:10.54	Isabel Marie Gose; Germany	8:10.60
1500 m freestyle	Anastasiya Kirpichnikova; Russia	15:18.30; CR	Simona Quadarella; Italy	15:34.16	Martina Caramignoli; Italy	15:37.33
50 m backstroke	Kira Toussaint; Netherlands	25.79	Analia Pigrée; France	26.08	Maaike de Waard; Netherlands	26.11
100 m backstroke	Kira Toussaint; Netherlands	55.76	Maaike de Waard; Netherlands	55.86	Analia Pigrée; France	56.40
200 m backstroke	Kira Toussaint; Netherlands	2:01.26	Margherita Panziera; Italy	2:02.05	Lena Grabowski; Austria	2:04.74
50 m breaststroke	Arianna Castiglioni; Italy	29.66	Benedetta Pilato; Italy	29.75	Nika Godun; Russia	29.80
100 m breaststroke	Martina Carraro; Italy	1:04.01	Evgeniia Chikunova; Russia Eneli Jefimova; Estonia	1:04.25	None awarded	
200 m breaststroke	Evgeniia Chikunova; Russia	2:16.88; WJR	Maria Temnikova; Russia	2:18.45	Francesca Fangio; Italy	2:19.69
50 m butterfly	Sarah Sjöström; Sweden	24.50; CR	Maaike de Waard; Netherlands	24.97	Silvia Di Pietro; Italy Anna Ntountounaki; Greece	25.09
100 m butterfly	Sarah Sjöström; Sweden	55.84	Anna Ntountounaki; Greece Anastasiya Shkurdai; Belarus	56.35	None awarded	
200 m butterfly	Svetlana Chimrova; Russia	2:04.97	Helena Rosendahl Bach; Denmark	2:05.02	Ilaria Bianchi; Italy	2:05.43
100 m individual medley	Alicja Tchórz; Poland	57.82	Maria Kameneva; Russia	57.83	Sarah Sjöström; Sweden	58.05
200 m individual medley	Anastasia Gorbenko; Israel	2:05.17	Maria Ugolkova; Switzerland	2:06.41	Viktoriya Zeynep Güneş; Turkey	2:07.67
400 m individual medley	Viktoriya Zeynep Güneş; Turkey	4:30.45	Anja Crevar; Serbia Sara Franceschi; Italy	4:30.47	None awarded	
4 × 50 m freestyle relay	Russia; Rozaliya Nasretdinova (24.18); Arina Surkova (23.41); Maria Kameneva (23.70); Daria Klepikova (23.63)	1:34.92	Netherlands; Kim Busch (24.18); Maaike de Waard (23.71); Kira Toussaint (23.92); Valerie van Roon (23.66)	1:35.47	Poland; Katarzyna Wasick (23.40); Kornelia Fiedkiewicz (24.20); Dominika Sztandera (24.87); Alicja Tchorz (23.47)	1:35.94
4 × 50 m medley relay	Russia; Maria Kameneva (26.42); Nika Godun (29.47); Arina Surkova (24.49); Daria Klepikova (23.81)	1:44.19	Sweden; Hanna Rosvall (26.57); Emelie Fast (29.96); Sara Junevik (24.85); Sarah Sjöström (22.94)	1:44.32	Italy; Silvia Scalia (26.59); Arianna Castiglioni (29.36); Elena Di Liddo (24.97); Silvia Di Pietro (23.54)	1:44.46

=== Mixed events ===
Event	Gold		Silver		Bronze	
4 × 50 m freestyle relay	Netherlands; Jesse Puts (21.06); Thom de Boer (20.55); Maaike de Waard (23.46); Kim Busch (23.86); Kenzo Simons; Stan Pijnenburg; Tamara van Vliet; Valerie van Roon	1:28.93	Italy; Alessandro Miressi (21.33); Lorenzo Zazzeri (20.59); Silvia Di Pietro (23.48); Costanza Cocconcelli (24.00); Leonardo Deplano; Filippo Megli; Chiara Tarantino	1:29.40	Poland; Paweł Juraszek (21.33); Jakub Majerski (21.03); Alicja Tchórz (24.01); Katarzyna Wasick (23.09)	1:29.46
4 × 50 m medley relay	Netherlands; Kira Toussaint (25.99); Arno Kamminga (25.54); Maaike de Waard (24.50); Thom de Boer (20.15); Kim Busch; Jesse Puts	1:36.18; WR	Italy; Michele Lamberti (22.72); Nicolò Martinenghi (25.13); Elena Di Liddo (25.09); Silvia Di Pietro (23.45); Matteo Rivolta; Alessandro Pinzuti; Costanza Cocconcelli; Chiara Tarantino	1:36.39	Russia; Kliment Kolesnikov (22.47); Oleg Kostin (25.58); Arina Surkova (24.88); Maria Kameneva (23.49); Pavel Samusenko; Kirill Strelnikov; Svetlana Chimrova; Rozaliya Nasretdinova	1:36.42
