= 2021 FINA World Swimming Championships (25 m) – Men's 50 metre backstroke =

Swimming competition

Men's 50 metre backstroke at the 2021 FINA World Swimming Championships (25 m)
- Venue: Etihad Arena
- Location: Abu Dhabi, United Arab Emirates
- Dates: 18 December (heats and semifinals); 19 December (final)
- Competitors: 49 from 42 nations

Medalists
gold medal	Kliment Kolesnikov
silver medal	Christian Diener	Germany
silver medal	Lorenzo Mora	Italy

The Men's 50 metre backstroke competition of the 2021 FINA World Swimming Championships (25 m) was held on 18 and 19 December 2021.

== Records ==
Prior to the competition, the existing world and championship records were as follows.

World record	Florent Manaudou (FRA)	22.22	Doha, Qatar	6 December 2014
Competition record	Florent Manaudou (FRA)	22.22	Doha, Qatar	6 December 2014

== Results ==
=== Heats ===
The heats were started on 18 December at 09:59.

Rank	Heat	Lane	Name	Nationality	Time	Notes
1	6	4	Kliment Kolesnikov	Russian Swimming Federation	23.14	Q
2	5	3	Gabriel Fantoni	Brazil	23.15	Q
3	3	4	Shaine Casas	United States	23.23	Q
4	5	5	Pavel Samusenko	Russian Swimming Federation	23.26	Q
5	6	5	Christian Diener	Germany	23.28	Q
6	4	6	Kacper Stokowski	Poland	23.33	Q
7	4	5	Guilherme Guido	Brazil	23.47	Q
8	4	3	Lorenzo Mora	Italy	23.49	Q
8	4	7	Jan Čejka	Czech Republic	23.49	Q, NR
10	5	4	Michele Lamberti	Italy	23.50	Q
11	5	2	Mohamed Samy	Egypt	23.54	Q, NR
11	6	3	Apostolos Christou	Greece	23.54	Q
13	5	6	Ole Braunschweig	Germany	23.57	Q
14	4	4	Robert Glință	Romania	23.58	Q
15	5	7	Simon Bucher	Austria	23.63	Q
16	6	1	Alexis Santos	Portugal	23.75	QSO
16	6	2	Tomáš Franta	Czech Republic	23.75	QSO
18	6	7	Grigori Pekarski	Belarus	23.77	
18	6	8	Mewen Tomac	France	23.77	
20	5	1	Won Young-jun	South Korea	23.94	
21	5	8	Doruk Tekin	Turkey	23.96	
21	6	6	Viktar Staselovich	Belarus	23.96	
23	4	2	Markus Lie	Norway	23.98	
24	4	1	Yohann Ndoye Brouard	France	24.03	
25	4	0	Michael Laitarovsky	Israel	24.32	
26	3	1	Jerard Jacinto	Philippines	24.40	NR
26	4	9	Srihari Nataraj	India	24.40	NR
28	6	9	Hugo González	Spain	24.41	
29	5	0	Lau Shiu Yue	Hong Kong	24.42	
30	4	8	Yeziel Morales	Puerto Rico	24.44	
31	6	0	Charles Hockin	Paraguay	24.48	
32	3	7	Jack Kirby	Barbados	24.71	NR
33	5	9	I Gede Siman Sudartawa	Indonesia	24.76	
34	3	8	Oleksandr Zheltiakov	Ukraine	24.82	
35	3	9	Filippos Iakovidis	Cyprus	25.17	NR
36	3	6	Max Mannes	Luxembourg	25.30	
37	2	4	Akalanka Peiris	Sri Lanka	25.31	
38	3	5	Maximillian Wilson	United States Virgin Islands	25.49	
39	2	5	Ali Al-Zamil	Kuwait	25.86	
40	3	0	Gabriel Castillo	Bolivia	25.96	
41	2	3	Felipe Jaramillo	Ecuador	26.18	NR
42	3	2	Omar Al-Rowaila	Bahrain	26.38	
43	3	3	Abdellah Ardjoune	Algeria	26.56	
44	2	2	Mekhayl Engel	Curaçao	26.68	
45	2	1	Juwel Ahmmed	Bangladesh	27.04	
46	2	6	Tameea Elhamayda	Qatar	27.80	
47	1	3	Rohan Shearer	Turks and Caicos Islands	28.96	
48	2	7	Ahmed Al-Marzooqi	United Arab Emirates	29.44	
49	2	8	Papa Poku-Dwumoh	Ghana	30.17	
	1	4	Souleymane Napare	Burkina Faso	DNS	
	1	5	Yousef Al-Washali	Yemen	DNS	

==== Swim-off ====
The swim-off was held on 18 December at 11:38.

Rank	Lane	Name	Nationality	Time	Notes
1	4	Alexis Santos	Portugal	23.41	Q, NR
2	5	Tomáš Franta	Czech Republic	23.71	

=== Semifinals ===
The semifinals were started on 18 December at 19:25.

Rank	Heat	Lane	Name	Nationality	Time	Notes
1	1	5	Pavel Samusenko	Russian Swimming Federation	22.74	Q
2	2	4	Kliment Kolesnikov	Russian Swimming Federation	22.78	Q
3	2	3	Christian Diener	Germany	22.89	Q
4	1	6	Lorenzo Mora	Italy	23.13	Q
4	2	5	Shaine Casas	United States	23.13	Q
6	1	2	Michele Lamberti	Italy	23.15	Q
7	1	3	Kacper Stokowski	Poland	23.17	Q
8	1	7	Apostolos Christou	Greece	23.26	Q
9	1	1	Robert Glință	Romania	23.28	
10	1	8	Alexis Santos	Portugal	23.35	NR
11	1	4	Gabriel Fantoni	Brazil	23.37	
12	2	2	Jan Čejka	Czech Republic	23.40	NR
13	2	6	Guilherme Guido	Brazil	23.51	
14	2	1	Ole Braunschweig	Germany	23.54	
15	2	8	Simon Bucher	Austria	23.58	
16	2	7	Mohamed Samy	Egypt	23.65	

=== Final ===
The final was held on 19 December at 19:35.

Rank	Lane	Name	Nationality	Time	Notes
1st place, gold medalist(s)	5	Kliment Kolesnikov	Russian Swimming Federation	22.66	
2nd place, silver medalist(s)	3	Christian Diener	Germany	22.90	
2nd place, silver medalist(s)	6	Lorenzo Mora	Italy	22.90	
4	4	Pavel Samusenko	Russian Swimming Federation	22.93	
5	7	Michele Lamberti	Italy	22.94	
6	1	Kacper Stokowski	Poland	22.98	
7	2	Shaine Casas	United States	22.99	
8	8	Apostolos Christou	Greece	23.08	
