= Matteo Lamberti =

Italian swimmer (born 1999)

Personal information
- National team: Italy
- Born: 24 March 1999 (age 27) Brescia, Italy
- Height: 1.93 m (6 ft 4 in)

Sport
- Sport: Swimming
- Strokes: Freestyle
- Club: Centro Sportivo Carabinieri
- Coach: Stefano Franceschi
Medal record
Men's swimming
Representing Italy
World University Games
Gold medal – first place	2021 Chengdu	400 m freestyle
Gold medal – first place	2021 Chengdu	800 m freestyle
Silver medal – second place	2021 Chengdu	4×200 m freestyle

Matteo Lamberti (born 24 March 1999) is an Italian competitive swimmer. He competed at the 2019 World University Games, placing fourth in the 800 metre freestyle and fifth in the 1500 metre freestyle. At the 2021 World Short Course Championships he placed fourth in the 4×200 metre freestyle relay, swimming the anchor leg of the relay in the prelims heats.

== Background ==
Lamberti was born 24 March 1999 in Brescia, Italy. He is the son of Tanya Vannini and former world record holder in swimming Giorgio Lamberti. His brother, Michele Lamberti, is a competitive swimmer as well.

== Career ==
=== 2019–2020 ===
In the final of the 800 metre freestyle at Piscina Felice Scandone in the 2019 World University Games, Lamberti placed fourth with a time of 7:58.29, finishing just two hundredths of a second behind the bronze medalist in the event, Filip Zaborowski of Poland. Earlier in the competition, Lamberti placed fifth in the final of the 1500 metre freestyle in 15:18.60. Later in the year, at the 2019 Italian Winter Championships in Riccione, Lamberti swam a personal best time of 15:13.40 in the 1500 metre freestyle, winning the bronze medal in the event. During the COVID-19 pandemic in October 2020, Lamberti had his training interrupted when he was one of a group of 10 Italian swimmers training together to test positive for COVID-19.

=== 2021 ===
At the 58th Settecolli competition in Rome in June 2021, Lamberti took third-place in the fastest timed final of the long course 400 metre freestyle with a time of 3:49.19 and fourth-place across all finals heats, achieving a time only 0.18 seconds slower than overall third-fastest swimmer Fernando Scheffer of Brazil. Later in the year, in November at the 47th Nico Sapio Trophy in Genoa, Lamberti finished with a time of 1:45.53 in the short course 200 metre freestyle, placing second behind fellow Italian Gabriele Detti by 0.2 seconds and ahead of his brother Michele Lamberti by 1.0 seconds. The same day, Lamberti won the 1500 metre freestyle with a personal best time of 14:38.96, dropping over 5 seconds from his previous best time swum in 2019. He also achieved a personal best time in the 400 metre freestyle the next day, finishing in a time of 3:41.28, which was a time drop of over 18 seconds from his previous fastest time of 3:59.68 set approximately four years earlier.

==== 2021 Italian Short Course Championships ====
On November 30, the first of two days of competition at the 2021 Italian National Championships conducted in short course metres in Riccione, Lamberti won the silver medal in the 400 metre freestyle with a personal best time of 3:40.86. In the 200 metre freestyle, Lamberti won the bronze medal in a time of 1:44.54, dropping 0.99 seconds from his previous best time and finishing only behind gold medalist Thomas Ceccon and silver medalist Filippo Megli. For his final event, the 1500 metre freestyle, Lamberti won the gold medal in a personal best time of 14:38.45, finishing over a second ahead of the next-fastest competitor. His time of 7:47.69 at the 800 metre mark marked a personal best time for him in the 800 metre freestyle.

==== 2021 World Short Course Championships ====
Lamberti, along with his brother Michele Lamberti, was named to the Italian team roster for the 2021 World Short Course Championships at Etihad Arena in Abu Dhabi, United Arab Emirates. On the fourth day of competition, Lamberti anchored the 4×200 metre freestyle relay consisting of him, Alberto Razzetti, Filippo Megli, and Marco De Tullio, with a split of 1:45.01 to finish the relay second in prelims heat one and qualify the relay to the final ranking second overall with a time of 6:56.52. For the finals relay, Thomas Ceccon and Matteo Ciampi substituted in for Lamberti and Marco De Tullio and the relay finished fourth with a time of 6:51.48.

=== 2022–2023 ===
At the 2022 Italian National Championships in Riccione in April, Lamberti placed fourth in the 400 metre freestyle with a personal best time of 3:48.23. He also placed fifth in the 1500 metre freestyle with a personal best time of 15:09.74, sixth in the 800 metre freestyle with a personal best time of 7:55.54, and sixth in the 200 metre freestyle with a personal best time of 1:47.97. In February 2023, he competed at the second edition of the Night Swim Cup, held in Milan, winning the silver medal in the 400 metre freestyle with a time of 3:53.53 and finishing within four seconds of gold medalist Gabriele Detti.

At the 2023 Italian National Championships in April in Riccione, Lamberti lowered his personal best time in the 400 metre freestyle by 2.20 seconds to a 3:46.03 and won the silver medal. On the third evening, he won the silver medal in the 800 metre freestyle behind gold medalist Gregorio Paltrinieri with a personal best time of 7:49.48, dropping 6.06 seconds from his previous personal best. The fourth day, he finished in a time of 1:48.26 in the final of the 200 metre freestyle, placing sixth. The final day of competition, 17 April, he won the silver medal in the 1500 metre freestyle with a personal best time of 15:05.40. Later in the session, he anchored the CS Carabinieri 4×100 metre freestyle relay team with a 49.66 to contribute to a time of 3:17.79 and overall placing of fourth.

== International championships ==
Meet	800 freestyle	1500 freestyle	4×200 freestyle relay
WUG 2019 (age: 20)	4th (7:58.29)	5th (15:18.60)	
SCW 2021 (age: 22)			4th^{[a]} (split 1:45.01, 4th leg)

^{a} Lamberti swam only in the prelims heats.

== Personal best times ==
=== Long course metres (50 m pool) ===
Event	Time	Meet	Location	Date	Ref
200 m freestyle	1.47.97	2022 Italian National Championships	Riccione	12 April 2022	
400 m freestyle	3:46.03	2023 Italian National Championships	Riccione	13 April 2023	
800 m freestyle	7:49.48	2023 Italian National Championships	Riccione	15 April 2023	
1500 m freestyle	15:05.40	2023 Italian National Championships	Riccione	17 April 2023	

=== Short course metres (25 m pool) ===
Event	Time		Meet	Location	Date	Ref
200 m freestyle	1:44.54		2021 Italian Short Course Championships	Riccione	1 December 2021	
400 m freestyle	3:40.86		2021 Italian Short Course Championships	Riccione	30 November 2021	
800 m freestyle	7:47.69	†	2021 Italian Short Course Championships	Riccione	1 December 2021	
1500 m freestyle	14:38.45		2021 Italian Short Course Championships	Riccione	1 December 2021	

Legend: † – en route to final mark
