= Fangio =

Fangio is a given name and surname. Notable people with the name include:

- Fangio Buyse (born 1974), Belgian footballer
- Francesca Fangio (born 1995), Italian swimmer
- Juan Manuel Fangio (1911–1995), Argentine racing car driver
- Juan Manuel Fangio II (born 1956), Argentine racing car driver
- Vic Fangio (born 1958), American football coach
