= Swimming at the 2022 European Aquatics Championships – Mixed 4 × 100 metre medley relay =

Mixed 4 × 100 metre medley relay at the 2022 European Aquatics Championships
- Venue: Foro Italico
- Dates: 12 August
- Competitors: 63 from 13 nations
- Teams: 13
- Winning time: 3:41.73

Medalists
gold medal	Kira Toussaint; Arno Kamminga; Nyls Korstanje; Marrit Steenbergen; Tessa Giele	Netherlands
silver medal	Thomas Ceccon; Nicolò Martinenghi; Elena Di Liddo; Silvia Di Pietro; Michele Lamberti; Francesca Fangio; Ilaria Bianchi; Leonardo Deplano	Italy
bronze medal	Medi Harris; James Wilby; Jacob Peters; Anna Hopkin; Lauren Cox; Greg Butler	Great Britain

The Mixed 4 × 100 metre medley relay competition of the 2022 European Aquatics Championships was held on 12 August 2022.

== Records ==
Prior to the competition, the existing European and championship records were as follows.

	Team	Time	Location	Date
World record European record	Great Britain	3:37.58	Tokyo	31 July 2021
Championship record	Great Britain	3:38.82	Budapest	20 May 2021

== Results ==
=== Heats ===
The heats were started at 09:55.

Rank	Heat	Lane	Nation	Swimmers	Time	Notes
1	1	4	Netherlands	Kira Toussaint (1:00.22); Arno Kamminga (59.61); Nyls Korstanje (51.63); Tessa Giele (55.18)	3:46.64	Q
2	1	6	Germany	Ole Braunschweig (53.78); Lucas Matzerath (59.76); Angelina Köhler (58.47); Nele Schulze (55.13)	3:47.14	Q
3	1	3	Poland	Paulina Peda (1:01.85); Dawid Wiekiera (1:00.26); Adrian Jaśkiewicz (51.78); Aleksandra Polańska (54.19)	3:48.08	Q
4	1	7	Great Britain	Lauren Cox (1:02.49); Greg Butler (1:00.95); Jacob Peters (52.14); Anna Hopkin (53.46)	3:49.04	Q
5	2	6	France	Mary-Ambre Moluh (1:01.96); Antoine Viquerat (1:00.83); Clément Secchi (51.69); Lucile Tessariol (55.44)	3:49.92	Q
6	2	7	Italy	Michele Lamberti (54.67); Francesca Fangio (1:07.87); Ilaria Bianchi (58.55); Leonardo Deplano (49.10)	3:50.19	Q
7	2	5	Greece	Apostolos Christou (54.49); Konstantinos Meretsolias (1:01.28); Anna Ntountounaki (59.46); Theodora Drakou (55.36)	3:50.59	Q
8	1	2	Israel	Aviv Barzelay (1:02.34); Kristian Pitshugin (1:00.93); Ron Polonsky (53.14); Anastasya Gorbenko (54.26)	3:50.67	Q
9	2	4	Sweden	Hanna Rosvall (1:01.99); Daniel Räisänen (1:00.96); Oskar Hoff (53.46); Sofia Åstedt (55.48)	3:51.89	
10	1	5	Switzerland	Nina Kost (1:02.55); Jérémy Desplanches (1:00.36); Julia Ullmann (1:00.08); Nils Liess (49.71)	3:52.70	
11	2	1	Ireland	Danielle Hill (1:03.15); Eoin Corby (1:01.35); Brendan Hyland (53.20); Victoria Catterson (55.45)	3:53.15	
12	2	2	Estonia	Armin Evert Lelle (56.96); Maria Romanjuk (1:10.82); Daniel Zaitsev (52.35); Aleksa Gold (56.27)	3:56.40	
13	2	8	Slovakia	Tamara Potocká (1:04.32); Andrea Podmaníková (1:10.82); Ádám Halás (54.59); Matej Duša (49.63)	3:59.36	
	2	3	Austria		Did not start	
	1	1	Spain		Did not start	

=== Final ===
The final was held at 19:40.

Rank	Lane	Nation	Swimmers	Time	Notes
1st place, gold medalist(s)	4	Netherlands	Kira Toussaint (59.49); Arno Kamminga (59.19); Nyls Korstanje (50.72); Marrit Steenbergen (52.33)	3:41.73	
2nd place, silver medalist(s)	7	Italy	Thomas Ceccon (52.82); Nicolò Martinenghi (58.13); Elena Di Liddo (58.49); Silvia Di Pietro (54.17)	3:43.61	
3rd place, bronze medalist(s)	6	Great Britain	Medi Harris (1:00.20); James Wilby (59.31); Jacob Peters (51.84); Anna Hopkin (53.34)	3:44.69	
4	3	Poland	Paulina Peda (1:00.64); Dawid Wiekiera (59.22); Jakub Majerski (51.13); Aleksandra Polańska (54.21)	3:45.20	NR
5	5	Germany	Ole Braunschweig (53.85); Lucas Matzerath (59.25); Angelina Köhler (58.36); Nele Schulze (55.08)	3:46.54	
6	2	France	Emma Terebo (1:00.93); Antoine Viquerat (1:00.14); Marie Wattel (57.57); Charles Rihoux (48.13)	3:46.77	
7	1	Greece	Apostolos Christou (53.05); Konstantinos Meretsolias (1:00.87); Anna Ntountounaki (57.92); Theodora Drakou (55.60)	3:47.44	
	8	Israel	Aviv Barzelay (1:01.75); Kristian Pitshugin; Ron Polonsky; Anastasya Gorbenko	Disqualified	
