= Swimming at the 2022 European Aquatics Championships – Men's 50 metre backstroke =

Men's 50 metre backstroke at the 2022 European Aquatics Championships
- Venue: Foro Italico
- Dates: 14 August (heats and semifinals); 15 August (final)
- Competitors: 47 from 28 nations
- Winning time: 24.36

Medalists
gold medal	Apostolos Christou	Greece
silver medal	Thomas Ceccon	Italy
bronze medal	Ole Braunschweig	Germany

The Men's 50 metre backstroke competition of the 2022 European Aquatics Championships was held on 14 and 15 August 2022.

== Records ==
Prior to the competition, the existing world, European and championship records were as follows.

	Name	Nation	Time	Location	Date
World record	Hunter Armstrong	United States	23.71	Greensboro	28 April 2022
European record Championship record	Kliment Kolesnikov	Russia	23.80	Budapest	18 May 2021

== Results ==
=== Heats ===
The heats were started on 14 August at 09:35.

Rank	Heat	Lane	Name	Nationality	Time	Notes
1	4	4	Thomas Ceccon	Italy	24.69	Q
2	5	4	Apostolos Christou	Greece	24.72	Q
3	3	6	Björn Seeliger	Sweden	24.79	Q, NR
4	5	5	Ole Braunschweig	Germany	24.81	Q
5	4	5	Michele Lamberti	Italy	24.88	Q
6	3	5	Yohann Ndoye Brouard	France	24.89	Q
7	5	6	Simone Stefanì	Italy	24.97	
8	4	3	Tomasz Polewka	Poland	25.04	Q
9	3	3	Michael Laitarovsky	Israel	25.05	Q
10	3	7	Kacper Stokowski	Poland	25.09	Q
11	4	2	Lorenzo Mora	Italy	25.18	
12	4	6	Juan Segura	Spain	25.24	Q
13	3	4	Ksawery Masiuk	Poland	25.27	
14	4	8	Roman Mityukov	Switzerland	25.31	Q
15	1	9	Shane Ryan	Ireland	25.33	Q
16	5	0	Andrei Anghel	Romania	25.37	Q
16	4	7	Tomáš Franta	Czech Republic	25.37	Q
18	5	7	Jonathon Marshall	Great Britain	25.42	Q
19	5	2	Paweł Franke	Poland	25.46	
20	2	5	Jonathon Adam	Great Britain	25.49	QSO
20	3	9	David Gerchik	Israel	25.49	QSO
22	3	1	Inbar Danziger	Israel	25.65	
23	5	1	Sebastian Somerset	Great Britain	25.69	
24	4	9	João Costa	Portugal	25.70	
25	2	4	Benedek Kovács	Hungary	25.73	
26	3	0	Daniel Zaitsev	Estonia	25.76	
27	4	1	Theodoros Andreopoulos	Greece	25.81	
28	5	8	Evangelos Makrygiannis	Greece	25.85	
29	2	2	Francisco Santos	Portugal	25.88	
30	3	2	Jan Cejka	Czech Republic	25.89	
31	2	3	Oleksandr Zheltyakov	Ukraine	25.91	
32	2	8	Rémi Fabiani	Luxembourg	26.03	
33	2	0	Markus Lie	Norway	26.07	
34	4	0	Adam Maraana	Israel	26.09	
35	5	9	Nicolás García	Spain	26.10	
36	2	6	Antoine Herlem	France	26.15	
37	2	7	Kaloyan Levterov	Bulgaria	26.30	
38	1	4	Erikas Grigaitis	Lithuania	26.34	
39	1	6	Anže Ferš Eržen	Slovenia	26.40	
40	1	5	Alex Ahtiainen	Estonia	26.43	
41	2	9	Riedel Lentz	Denmark	26.46	
42	2	1	Filippos Iakovidis	Cyprus	26.89	
43	1	2	Olli Kokko	Finland	27.92	
44	1	8	Martin Muja	Kosovo	28.15	
45	1	7	Thomas Wareing	Malta	28.35	
46	1	1	Ared Ruci	Albania	29.98	
47	1	0	Kevin Shkurti	Albania	31.32	
	1	3	Oskar Hoff	Sweden	Did not start	
	3	8	Simon Bucher	Austria	Did not start	
	5	3	Mewen Tomac	France	Did not start	

=== Swim-off ===
The swim-off was held on 14 August at 10:15.

Rank	Lane	Name	Nationality	Time	Notes
1	5	David Gerchik	Israel	25.11	Q
2	4	Jonathon Adam	Great Britain	25.26	

=== Semifinals ===
The semifinals were started on 14 August at 18:30.

Rank	Heat	Lane	Name	Nationality	Time	Notes
1	1	4	Apostolos Christou	Greece	24.48	Q
2	2	4	Thomas Ceccon	Italy	24.65	Q
3	1	6	Michael Laitarovsky	Israel	24.74	Q
4	1	5	Ole Braunschweig	Germany	24.75	q
5	2	3	Michele Lamberti	Italy	24.82	Q
6	1	3	Yohann Ndoye Brouard	France	24.96	q
7	2	2	Kacper Stokowski	Poland	24.98	q
8	2	6	Tomasz Polewka	Poland	25.04	q
9	2	5	Björn Seeliger	Sweden	25.09	
10	2	7	Roman Mityukov	Switzerland	25.11	
11	2	1	Tomáš Franta	Czech Republic	25.12	
12	1	1	Andrei Anghel	Romania	25.14	
13	1	7	Shane Ryan	Ireland	25.19	
14	2	8	Jonathon Marshall	Great Britain	25.26	
15	1	8	David Gerchik	Israel	25.27	
16	1	2	Juan Segura	Spain	25.48	

=== Final ===
The final was held on 15 August at 19:24.

Rank	Lane	Name	Nationality	Time	Notes
1st place, gold medalist(s)	4	Apostolos Christou	Greece	24.36	NR
2nd place, silver medalist(s)	5	Thomas Ceccon	Italy	24.40	NR
3rd place, bronze medalist(s)	6	Ole Braunschweig	Germany	24.68	
4	3	Michael Laitarovsky	Israel	24.75	
5	2	Michele Lamberti	Italy	24.85	
6	1	Kacper Stokowski	Poland	24.99	
7	7	Yohann Ndoye Brouard	France	25.06	
8	8	Tomasz Polewka	Poland	25.08	
