= Swimming at the 2018 Summer Youth Olympics – Boys' 4 × 100 metre freestyle relay =

Boys' 4 × 100 metre freestyle relay at the 2018 Summer Youth Olympics
- Venue: Natatorium
- Dates: 9 October
- Competitors: 32 from 8 nations
- Winning time: 3:18.11

Medalists
gold medal	Kliment Kolesnikov; Daniil Markov; Vladislav Gerasimenko; Andrei Minakov	Russia
silver medal	Murilo Sartori; Lucas Peixoto; André Calvelo; Vitor de Souza	Brazil
bronze medal	Federico Burdisso; Thomas Ceccon; Marco De Tullio; Johannes Calloni	Italy

The boys' 4 × 100 metre freestyle relay event at the 2018 Summer Youth Olympics took place on 9 October at the Natatorium in Buenos Aires, Argentina.

== Results ==
=== Final ===
The final was held at 19:30.

Rank	Lane	Name	Nationality	Time	Notes
1st place, gold medalist(s)	2	Kliment Kolesnikov (48.04); Daniil Markov (49.58); Vladislav Gerasimenko (51.56); Andrei Minakov (48.93)	Russia	3:18.11	
2nd place, silver medalist(s)	6	Murilo Sartori (50.55); Lucas Peixoto (49.70); André Calvelo (48.87); Vitor de Souza (51.87)	Brazil	3:20.99	
3rd place, bronze medalist(s)	8	Federico Burdisso (50.06); Thomas Ceccon (49.33); Marco De Tullio (50.84); Johannes Calloni (51.78)	Italy	3:22.01	
4	4	Wang Guanbin (51.40); Shen Jiahao (50.52); Sun Jiajun (51.71); Hong Jinquan (50.40)	China	3:24.03	
5	7	Ashton Brinkworth (50.79); Lewis Blackburn (51.69); Joseph Jackson (50.89); Stuart Swinburn (51.32)	Australia	3:24.69	
6	5	Keisuke Yoshida (52.14); Taku Taniguchi (51.15); Shinnosuke Ishikawa (52.22); Yu Hanaguruma (51.29)	Japan	3:26.80	
7	3	Will Barao (53.14); Ethan Dang (52.80); Jake Johnson (52.56); Ethan Harder (51.85)	United States	3:30.35	
8	1	Ethan du Preez (53.58); Hendrik Duvenhage (52.80); Gabriel Nortje (51.02); Michael Houlie (53.79)	South Africa	3:31.19	
