= 2021 FINA World Swimming Championships (25 m) – Men's 100 metre individual medley =

Swimming competition

Men's 100 metre individual medley at the 2021 FINA World Swimming Championships (25 m)
- Venue: Etihad Arena
- Location: Abu Dhabi, United Arab Emirates
- Dates: 18 December (heats and semifinals); 19 December (final)
- Competitors: 39 from 32 nations
- Winning time: 51.09

Medalists
gold medal	Kliment Kolesnikov
silver medal	Tomoe Hvas	Norway
bronze medal	Thomas Ceccon	Italy

The Men's 100 metre individual medley competition of the 2021 FINA World Swimming Championships (25 m) was held on 18 and 19 December 2021.

== Records ==
Prior to the competition, the existing world and championship records were as follows.

World record	Caeleb Dressel (USA)	49.28	Budapest, Hungary	22 November 2020
Competition record	Kliment Kolesnikov (RUS)	50.63	Hangzhou, China	14 December 2018

== Results ==
=== Heats ===
The heats were started on 18 December at 09:30.

Rank	Heat	Lane	Name	Nationality	Time	Notes
1	5	5	Daiya Seto	Japan	51.52	Q
2	4	2	Caio Pumputis	Brazil	51.99	Q
3	3	3	Finlay Knox	Canada	52.05	Q
4	4	3	Tomoe Hvas	Norway	52.48	Q
5	5	4	Marco Orsi	Italy	52.53	Q
6	4	7	Hwang Sun-woo	South Korea	52.56	Q
7	3	2	Yakov Toumarkin	Israel	52.62	Q
7	3	4	Kliment Kolesnikov	Russian Swimming Federation	52.62	Q
9	5	7	Leonardo Coelho Santos	Brazil	52.80	Q
10	5	2	Heiko Gigler	Austria	52.81	Q
11	3	7	Georgios Spanoudakis	Greece	52.85	Q
11	4	4	Marcin Cieślak	Poland	52.85	Q
13	5	1	Nic Fink	United States	52.87	Q
14	4	6	Bernhard Reitshammer	Austria	52.91	Q
15	4	5	Thomas Ceccon	Italy	52.96	Q
16	3	5	Andreas Vazaios	Greece	52.98	Q
17	5	3	Michael Andrew	United States	53.04	
18	4	1	Alexis Santos	Portugal	53.08	
19	3	0	Stan Pijnenburg	Netherlands	53.29	
20	4	0	Louis Croenen	Belgium	53.32	
21	3	6	Andrey Zhilkin	Russian Swimming Federation	53.49	
22	3	8	Ronny Brännkärr	Finland	53.55	
23	4	8	Metin Aydın	Turkey	53.87	
24	3	9	Berke Saka	Turkey	53.90	
25	4	9	Ádám Halás	Slovakia	54.00	
26	2	7	Balázs Holló	Hungary	54.05	
27	2	6	Roman Mityukov	Switzerland	54.31	
28	2	1	Benjamin Hockin	Paraguay	54.70	
29	1	3	Munzer Kabbara	Lebanon	54.79	NR
30	2	5	Guido Buscaglia	Argentina	55.17	
31	2	3	Cevin Anders Siim	Estonia	55.40	
32	1	6	Erick Gordillo	Guatemala	55.45	NR
33	2	8	Ronens Kermans	Latvia	56.27	
34	2	0	Ronan Wantenaar	Namibia	56.92	
35	1	5	Tasi Limtiaco	Federated States of Micronesia	57.05	
36	1	2	Nguyễn Hữu Kim Sơn	Vietnam	57.70	
37	2	9	Thomas Wareing	Malta	58.33	
38	1	4	Manuel Campo	El Salvador	58.95	
39	1	7	Mohamed Aan Hussain	Maldives	1:05.20	
	2	2	Maximillian Ang	Singapore	DNS	
	2	4	Jaouad Syoud	Algeria	DNS	
	3	1	José Martínez	Mexico	DNS	
	5	0	Mohamed Samy	Egypt	DNS	
	5	6	Duncan Scott	Great Britain	DNS	
	5	8	Markus Lie	Norway	DNS	
	5	9	Jan Šefl	Czech Republic	DNS	

=== Semifinals ===
The semifinals were started on 18 December at 18:14.

Rank	Heat	Lane	Name	Nationality	Time	Notes
1	1	6	Kliment Kolesnikov	Russian Swimming Federation	51.33	Q
2	1	5	Tomoe Hvas	Norway	51.39	Q, NR
3	2	4	Daiya Seto	Japan	51.52	Q
4	2	8	Thomas Ceccon	Italy	51.86	Q
5	1	8	Andreas Vazaios	Greece	51.89	Q
6	2	5	Finlay Knox	Canada	51.99	Q
7	1	1	Bernhard Reitshammer	Austria	52.03	Q
7	2	3	Marco Orsi	Italy	52.03	Q
9	1	3	Hwang Sun-woo	South Korea	52.13	NR
10	1	2	Heiko Gigler	Austria	52.21	
11	2	6	Yakov Toumarkin	Israel	52.27	
12	1	7	Marcin Cieślak	Poland	52.45	
12	2	2	Leonardo Coelho Santos	Brazil	52.45	
14	1	4	Caio Pumputis	Brazil	52.65	
15	2	7	Georgios Spanoudakis	Greece	52.85	
16	2	1	Nic Fink	United States	54.07	

=== Final ===
The final was held on 19 December at 18:13.

Rank	Lane	Name	Nationality	Time	Notes
1st place, gold medalist(s)	4	Kliment Kolesnikov	Russian Swimming Federation	51.09	
2nd place, silver medalist(s)	5	Tomoe Hvas	Norway	51.35	NR
3rd place, bronze medalist(s)	6	Thomas Ceccon	Italy	51.40	
4	3	Daiya Seto	Japan	51.46	
5	7	Finlay Knox	Canada	51.70	NR
6	2	Andreas Vazaios	Greece	51.74	
7	8	Marco Orsi	Italy	51.76	
8	1	Bernhard Reitshammer	Austria	52.16	
