= 2021 FINA World Swimming Championships (25 m) – Men's 4 × 50 metre medley relay =

Swimming competition

Men's 4 × 50 metre medley relay at the 2021 FINA World Swimming Championships (25 m)
- Venue: Etihad Arena
- Location: Abu Dhabi, United Arab Emirates
- Dates: 20 December (heats and final)
- Competitors: 71 from 15 nations
- Teams: 15
- Winning time: 1:30.51 =CR

Medalists
gold medal	Kliment Kolesnikov; Kirill Strelnikov; Andrey Minakov; Vladimir Morozov; Pavel Samusenko; Andrei Nikolaev; Oleg Kostin; Aleksandr Shchegolev
gold medal	Shaine Casas; Nic Fink; Tom Shields; Ryan Held; Will Licon; Trenton Julian; Zach Apple	United States
bronze medal	Lorenzo Mora; Nicolò Martinenghi; Matteo Rivolta; Lorenzo Zazzeri; Michele Lamberti; Thomas Ceccon	Italy

The Men's 4 × 50 metre medley relay competition of the 2021 FINA World Swimming Championships (25 m) was held on 20 December 2021.

== Records ==
Prior to the competition, the existing world and championship records were as follows.

World record	Italy (ITA)	1:30.14	Kazan, Russia	3 November 2021
Competition record	Brazil (BRA)	1:30.51	Doha, Qatar	4 December 2014

The following new records were set during this competition:

Date	Event	Name	Nation	Time	Record
20 December	Final	Kliment Kolesnikov (22.76); Kirill Strelnikov (25.62); Andrey Minakov (21.76); Vladimir Morozov (20.37)	Russian Swimming Federation	1:30.51	=CR
20 December	Final	Shaine Casas (23.11); Nic Fink (25.13); Tom Shields (21.75); Ryan Held (20.52)	United States	1:30.51	=CR

== Results ==
=== Heats ===
The heats were started at 09:30.

Rank	Heat	Lane	Nation	Swimmers	Time	Notes
1	1	4	Russian Swimming Federation	Pavel Samusenko (23.38); Andrei Nikolaev (26.16); Oleg Kostin (22.08); Aleksandr Shchegolev (20.90)	1:32.52	Q
2	1	6	Egypt	Mohamed Samy (23.69); Youssef El-Kamash (26.40); Youssef Ramadan (22.37); Abdelrahman Sameh (20.73)	1:33.19	Q, AF
3	2	7	Brazil	Guilherme Guido (23.27); Caio Pumputis (26.33); Vinicius Lanza (22.51); Gabriel Santos (21.10)	1:33.21	Q
4	1	8	United States	Shaine Casas (23.34); Will Licon (26.11); Trenton Julian (22.57); Zach Apple (21.27)	1:33.29	Q
5	2	4	Italy	Lorenzo Mora (23.65); Nicolò Martinenghi (26.00); Michele Lamberti (22.84); Thomas Ceccon (21.11)	1:33.60	Q
6	1	5	Norway	Markus Lie (23.72); André Grindheim (27.30); Tomoe Hvas (22.49); Nicholas Lia (20.82)	1:34.33	Q
7	1	3	Poland	Kacper Stokowski (23.48); Marcin Cieślak (27.08); Jakub Majerski (22.63); Paweł Juraszek (21.35)	1:34.54	Q
8	2	6	Lithuania	Danas Rapšys (24.46); Andrius Šidlauskas (26.63); Deividas Margevičius (22.96); Simonas Bilis (21.15)	1:35.20	Q
9	2	3	France	Mewen Tomac (23.79); Antoine Viquerat (26.16); Thomas Piron (23.09); Yohann Ndoye Brouard (22.40)	1:35.44	
10	2	5	Turkey	Doruk Tekin (23.87); Berkay Ömer Öğretir (26.41); Rasim Oğulcan Gör (23.29); Baturalp Ünlü (22.05)	1:35.62	
11	1	1	Hong Kong	Lau Shiu Yue (24.41); Ng Yan Kin (27.62); Ng Cheuk Yin (23.32); Ian Ho (21.01)	1:36.36	NR
12	1	7	South Korea	Won Young-jun (24.04); Moon Jae-kwon (26.48); Moon Seung-woo (24.25); Lee Ho-joon (22.74)	1:37.51	
13	1	2	Vietnam	Trần Hưng Nguyên (25.00); Phạm Thanh Bảo (27.53); Hồ Nguyễn Duy Khoa (24.96); Nguyễn Hữu Kim Sơn (25.66)	1:43.15	
14	2	2	Kuwait	Faisal Al-Tannak (27.59); Ali Al-Zamil (29.45); Mashari Al-Samhan (25.51); Sauod Al-Shamroukh (24.23)	1:46.78	
	2	8	China	Wang Gukailai; Qin Haiyang; Sun Jiajun; Wang Changhao	DSQ	
	2	1	Slovakia		DNS	

=== Final ===
The final was held at 18:00.

Rank	Lane	Nation	Swimmers	Time	Notes
1st place, gold medalist(s)	4	Russian Swimming Federation	Kliment Kolesnikov (22.76); Kirill Strelnikov (25.62); Andrey Minakov (21.76); Vladimir Morozov (20.37)	1:30.51	=CR
1st place, gold medalist(s)	6	United States	Shaine Casas (23.11); Nic Fink (25.13); Tom Shields (21.75); Ryan Held (20.52)	1:30.51	=CR, =AM
3rd place, bronze medalist(s)	2	Italy	Lorenzo Mora (23.24); Nicolò Martinenghi (25.30); Matteo Rivolta (21.95); Lorenzo Zazzeri (20.29)	1:30.78	
4	3	Brazil	Gabriel Fantoni (22.84); João Gomes Júnior (25.52); Vinicius Lanza (22.45); Gabriel Santos (21.10)	1:31.91	
5	5	Egypt	Mohamed Samy (23.68); Youssef El-Kamash (26.32); Youssef Ramadan (22.12); Abdelrahman Sameh (20.44)	1:32.56	AF
6	1	Poland	Kacper Stokowski (23.20); Marcin Cieślak (26.79); Jakub Majerski (22.45); Paweł Juraszek (20.69)	1:33.13	
7	7	Norway	Markus Lie (23.73); André Grindheim (27.08); Tomoe Hvas (22.41); Nicholas Lia (20.91)	1:34.13	
8	8	Lithuania	Danas Rapšys (24.40); Andrius Šidlauskas (26.58); Deividas Margevičius (22.77); Simonas Bilis (21.07)	1:34.82	
