= Swimming at the 2026 European Aquatics Championships – Men's 4 × 100 metre medley relay =

Men's 4 × 100 metre medley relay at the 2026 European Aquatics Championships
- Venue: Paris Aquatic Centre
- Dates: 16 August (heats and final)
- Competitors: 87 from 19 nations
- Teams: 19
- Winning time: 3:28.67

Medalists
gold medal	Kliment Kolesnikov; Ivan Kozhakin; Andrey Minakov; Egor Kornev; Pavel Samusenko; Kirill Prigoda; Roman Shevliakov; Vasilii Kukushkin
silver medal	Thomas Ceccon; Nicolò Martinenghi; Alberto Razzetti; Carlos D'Ambrosio; Michele Lamberti; Michele Busa	Italy
bronze medal	Yohann Ndoye-Brouard; Carl Aitkaci; Léon Marchand; Maxime Grousset; Mewen Tomac; Amaury Albar; Cédric Gabali	France

The Men's 4 × 100 metre medley relay competition of the 2026 European Aquatics Championships was held on 16 August 2026.

== Records ==
Prior to the competition, the existing world, European and championship records were as follows.

	Team	Time	Location	Date
World record	United States	3:26.78	Tokyo	1 August 2021
European record	Neutral Athletes B	3:26.93	Singapore	25 June 2025
Championship record	Italy	3:28.46	Rome	17 August 2022

== Results ==
=== Heats ===
The heats were started at 10:49.
Qualification Rules: The 8 fastest from the heats qualify to the final.

Rank	Heat	Lane	Nation	Swimmers	Time	Notes
1	3	5	Neutral Athletes B	Pavel Samusenko (52.58); Kirill Prigoda (58.55); Roman Shevliakov (51.81); Vasilii Kukushkin (47.87)	3:30.81	Q
2	3	3	Great Britain	Oliver Morgan (53.55); Filip Nowacki (58.94); Edward Mildred (50.80); Alexander Cohoon (47.90)	3:31.19	Q
3	1	5	Italy	Michele Lamberti (54.12); Nicolò Martinenghi (58.12); Michele Busa (51.54); Carlos D'Ambrosio (47.84)	3:31.62	Q
4	2	5	Germany	Cornelius Jahn (54.51); Melvin Imoudu (58.81); Kaii Winkler (50.94); Josha Salchow (47.92)	3:32.18	Q
5	3	1	France	Mewen Tomac (53.30); Carl Aitkaci (59.92); Amaury Albar (51.66); Cédric Gabali (47.91)	3:32.79	Q
6	3	0	Spain	Iván Martínez (53.79); Nil Cadevall (59.91); Isak Fernández (52.18); Luca Hoek (47.10)	3:32.98	Q
7	2	2	Denmark	Robert Falborg Pedersen (53.78); Elias Marius Elsgaard (59.83); Casper Puggaard (51.65); Oliver Søgaard-Andersen (47.87)	3:33.13	Q, NR
8	1	3	Switzerland	Roman Mityukov (53.69); Gian-Luca Gartmann (1:01.34); Noè Ponti (49.70); Balint Ashton (48.60)	3:33.33	Q, NR
9	3	6	Greece	Evangelos Makrygiannis (53.94); Evangelos Ntoumas (1:00.81); Apostolos Siskos (51.64); Stergios Bilas (47.28)	3:33.67	NR
10	3	8	Ireland	John Shortt (53.97); Jack Kelly (59.18); Jack Cassin (52.05); Evan Bailey (48.54)	3:33.74	NR
11	1	4	Neutral Athletes A	Artsiom Yarmak (54.11); Ilya Shymanovich (58.65); Ivan Shamshuryn (52.52); Grigori Pekarski (48.99)	3:34.27	
12	3	2	Croatia	Luka Čarapović (54.54); Filip Mujan (1:00.64); Vili Sivec (51.40); Vlaho Nenadić (48.29)	3:34.87	NR
13	2	3	Poland	Aleksander Styś (55.02); Jan Kałusowski (59.87); Jakub Majerski (51.72); Kamil Sieradzki (48.70)	3:35.31	
14	2	6	Romania	Denis Popescu (55.02); Matei State (1:00.77); Vlad Mihalache (52.14); Patrick Dinu (47.41)	3:35.34	
15	2	7	Austria	Max Halbeisen (54.13); Luka Mladenovic (1:00.75); Lukas Edl (51.68); Christian Giefing (49.04)	3:35.60	
16	3	7	Israel	Tomer Shuster (53.65); Mark Teler (1:00.72); Daniel Krichevsky (53.38); Alexey Glivinskiy (48.82)	3:36.57	
17	2	4	Sweden	Vidar Carlbaum (55.61); Oliver Munn (1:01.83); Melker Rosengren (53.25); Charlie Skoglund Macmillan (48.25)	3:38.94	
18	2	8	Iceland	Guðmundur Leo Rafnsson (55.94); Einar Margeir Ágústsson (1:01.38); Birnir Freyr Hálfdánarson (54.27); Simon Elias Statkevičius (50.76)	3:42.35	
19	3	4	Latvia	Ārons Roderts (58.29); Emīls Krampe (1:02.83); Dmitrijs Tolstihs (56.70); Jānis Deivs Dzirkalis (50.50)	3:48.32	
	2	0	Ukraine		Did not start	
	2	1	Lithuania		Did not start	

=== Final ===
The final was on at 20:11.

Rank	Lane	Nation	Swimmers	Time	Notes
1st place, gold medalist(s)	4	Neutral Athletes B	Kliment Kolesnikov (53.00); Ivan Kozhakin (58.48); Andrey Minakov (50.34); Egor Kornev (46.85)	3:28.67	
2nd place, silver medalist(s)	3	Italy	Thomas Ceccon (52.72); Nicolò Martinenghi (58.00); Alberto Razzetti (51.13); Carlos D'Ambrosio (47.01)	3:28.86	
3rd place, bronze medalist(s)	2	France	Yohann Ndoye-Brouard (53.05); Carl Aitkaci (59.43); Léon Marchand (49.64); Maxime Grousset (46.91)	3:29.03	
4	5	Great Britain	Oliver Morgan (52.61); Adam Ramsay-Peaty (58.56); Edward Mildred (50.56); Matthew Richards (47.38)	3:29.11	
5	6	Germany	Cornelius Jahn (54.09); Melvin Imoudu (58.76); Kaii Winkler (51.32); Josha Salchow (47.38)	3:31.55	
6	7	Spain	Iván Martínez (53.56); Nil Cadevall (59.77); Isak Fernández (51.97); Luca Hoek (46.85)	3:32.15	
7	1	Denmark	Robert Falborg Pedersen (53.61) NR; Elias Marius Elsgaard (59.35); Casper Puggaard (51.41); Oliver Søgaard-Andersen (48.07)	3:32.44	NR
8	8	Switzerland	Roman Mityukov (53.81); Gian-Luca Gartmann (1:01.13); Noè Ponti (49.40); Balint Ashton (48.15)	3:32.49	NR
