= Thomas Ceccon =

Italian swimmer (born 2001)

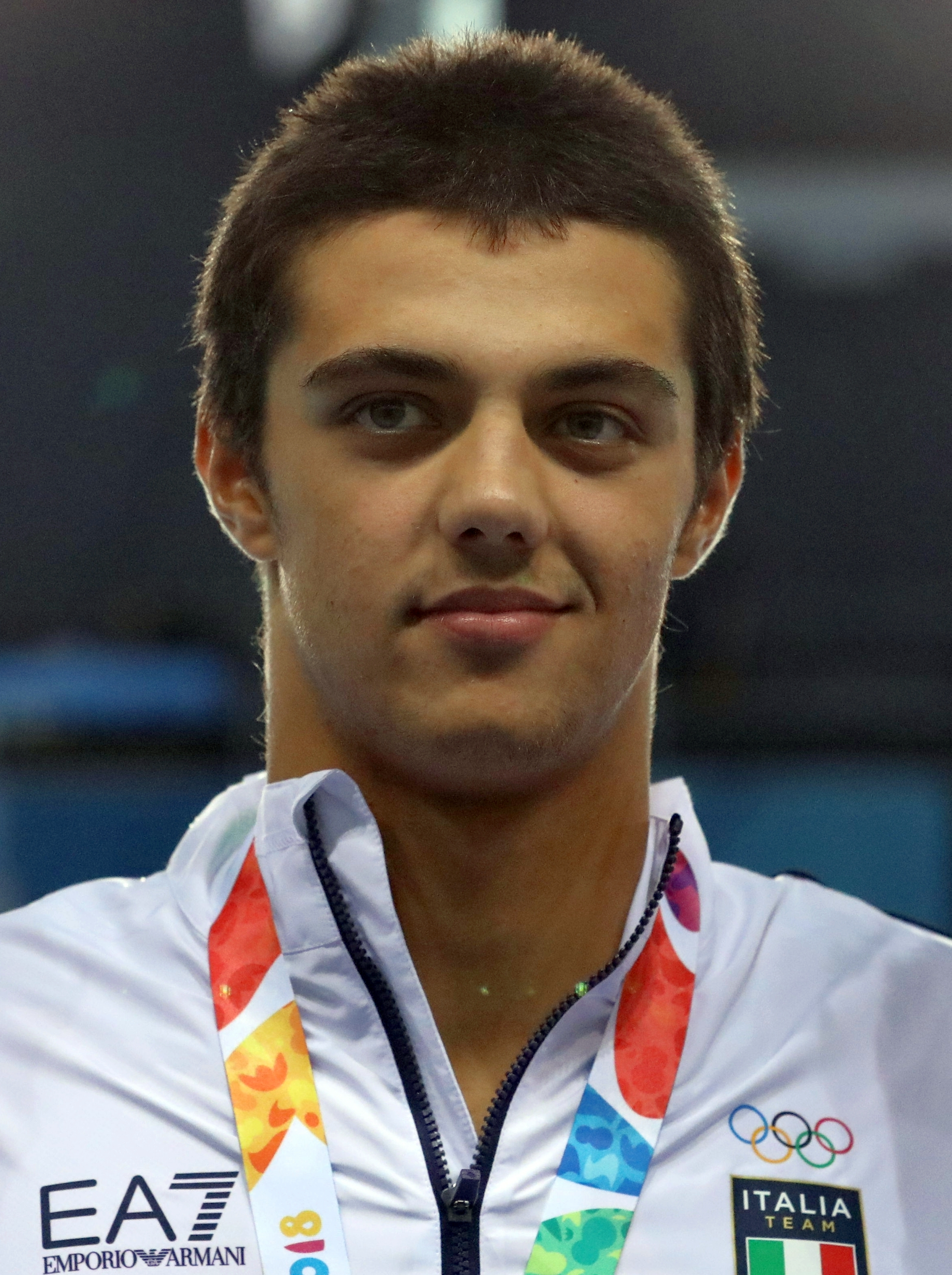
- Ceccon in 2018

Personal information
- National team: Italy
- Born: 27 January 2001 (age 25) Thiene, Italy
- Height: 1.97 m (6 ft 6 in)
- Weight: 80 kg (176 lb)

Sport
- Sport: Swimming
- Strokes: Backstroke, butterfly, freestyle, individual medley
- Club: GS Fiamme Oro
- Coach: Alberto Burlina
Medal record
Men's swimming
Representing Italy
Senior level
Event	1st	2nd	3rd
Olympic Games	1	1	2
World Championships (LC)	3	4	2
World Championships (SC)	4	2	4
European Championships (LC)	4	4	5
European Championships (SC)	4	3	2
Total	16	14	15
Junior
Event	1st	2nd	3rd
Youth Olympic Games	1	2	2
World Junior Championships	2	1	3
European Junior Championships	4	3	2
European Youth Olympic Festival	1	2	2
Total	8	8	9
Senior level
Olympic Games Olympic Games
Gold medal – first place	2024 Paris	100 m backstroke
Silver medal – second place	2020 Tokyo	4×100 m freestyle
Bronze medal – third place	2020 Tokyo	4×100 m medley
Bronze medal – third place	2024 Paris	4×100 m freestyle
World Championships (LC)
Gold medal – first place	2022 Budapest	100 m backstroke
Gold medal – first place	2022 Budapest	4×100 m medley
Gold medal – first place	2023 Fukuoka	50 m butterfly
Silver medal – second place	2023 Fukuoka	100 m backstroke
Silver medal – second place	2023 Fukuoka	4×100 m freestyle
Silver medal – second place	2025 Singapore	100 m backstroke
Silver medal – second place	2025 Singapore	4×100 m freestyle
Bronze medal – third place	2022 Budapest	4×100 m freestyle
Bronze medal – third place	2025 Singapore	50 m butterfly
World Championships (SC)
Gold medal – first place	2021 Abu Dhabi	4×100 m medley
Gold medal – first place	2022 Melbourne	100 m medley
Gold medal – first place	2022 Melbourne	4×100 m freestyle
Gold medal – first place	2022 Melbourne	4×50 m medley
Silver medal – second place	2021 Abu Dhabi	4×100 m freestyle
Silver medal – second place	2022 Melbourne	4×50 m freestyle
Bronze medal – third place	2021 Abu Dhabi	100 m medley
Bronze medal – third place	2021 Abu Dhabi	4×50 m medley
Bronze medal – third place	2022 Melbourne	4×200 m freestyle
Bronze medal – third place	2022 Melbourne	4×100 m medley
European Championships (LC)
Gold medal – first place	2022 Rome	100 m backstroke
Gold medal – first place	2022 Rome	50 m butterfly
Gold medal – first place	2022 Rome	4×100 m freestyle
Gold medal – first place	2022 Rome	4×100 m medley
Silver medal – second place	2022 Rome	50 m backstroke
Silver medal – second place	2022 Rome	4×100 m mixed medley
Silver medal – second place	2026 Paris	100 m backstroke
Silver medal – second place	2026 Paris	4×100 m medley
Bronze medal – third place	2020 Budapest	4×100 m freestyle
Bronze medal – third place	2020 Budapest	4×100 m medley
Bronze medal – third place	2020 Budapest	4×100 m mixed freestyle
Bronze medal – third place	2026 Paris	200 m backstroke
Bronze medal – third place	2026 Paris	4x100 m mixed freestyle
European Championships (SC)
Gold medal – first place	2021 Kazan	4×50 m medley
Gold medal – first place	2023 Otopeni	4×50 m medley
Gold medal – first place	2025 Lublin	100 m backstroke
Gold medal – first place	2025 Lublin	4×50 m freestyle
Silver medal – second place	2021 Kazan	200 m medley
Silver medal – second place	2021 Kazan	4×50 m freestyle
Silver medal – second place	2023 Otopeni	4×50 m freestyle
Bronze medal – third place	2019 Glasgow	4×50 m freestyle
Bronze medal – third place	2021 Kazan	50 m butterfly
Junior level
Summer Youth Olympics
Gold medal – first place	2018 Buenos Aires	50 m freestyle
Silver medal – second place	2018 Buenos Aires	50 m backstroke
Silver medal – second place	2018 Buenos Aires	200 m medley
Bronze medal – third place	2018 Buenos Aires	100 m backstroke
Bronze medal – third place	2018 Buenos Aires	4×100 m freestyle
World Junior Championships
Gold medal – first place	2019 Budapest	100 m backstroke
Gold medal – first place	2019 Budapest	50 m butterfly
Silver medal – second place	2017 Indinapolis	4x100 m medley
Bronze medal – third place	2019 Budapest	50 m backstroke
Bronze medal – third place	2019 Budapest	4x100 m freestyle
Bronze medal – third place	2019 Budapest	4x100 m mixed freestyle
European Junior Championships
Gold medal – first place	2017 Netanya	4x100 m medley
Gold medal – first place	2017 Netanya	4x100 m mixed medley
Gold medal – first place	2019 Kazan	50 m backstroke
Gold medal – first place	2019 Kazan	100 m backstroke
Silver medal – second place	2018 Helsinki	4x100 m freestyle
Silver medal – second place	2019 Kazan	4x100 m freestyle
Silver medal – second place	2019 Kazan	4x100 m medley
Bronze medal – third place	2018 Helsinki	4x100 m medley
Bronze medal – third place	2019 Kazan	4x100 m mixed freestyle
European Youth Olympic Festival
Gold medal – first place	2017 Győr	200 m medley
Silver medal – second place	2017 Győr	4x100 m freestyle
Silver medal – second place	2017 Győr	100 m mixed freestyle
Bronze medal – third place	2017 Győr	100 m freestyle
Bronze medal – third place	2017 Győr	4x100 m medley

Thomas Ceccon (Italian pronunciation: [ˈtɔːmas tʃekˈkon]; born 27 January 2001) is an Italian swimmer. He is the 2024 Olympic champion and current world record holder in the 100 metre backstroke and has won a total of four Olympic medals, along with being a three-time World champion and a four-time European champion in long course competitions.

== Background ==
Ceccon was born in Thiene, in the province of Vicenza, Italy, on 27 January 2001. He trains under coach Alberto Burlina for Gruppo Sportivo Fiamme Oro. He has retained the Italian record in the long course 100 metre backstroke since 17 December 2020, starting with a time of 52.84.

== Career ==
Ceccon won the 50 m free style Youth Olympic title and 4 other medals at 2018 Youth Olympic Games in Buenos Aires. He participated to the 2019 World Aquatics Championships. He won two gold medals at the 2019 FINA World Junior Swimming Championships.

=== 2021 ===
==== 2020 Summer Olympics ====
At the 2020 Summer Olympics, held in 2021 due to the COVID-19 pandemic and contested in Tokyo, Japan, Ceccon won a silver medal in the 4×100 metre freestyle relay on the second day of competition, contributing a split of 47.45 seconds for the second leg of the relay to help finish second in an Italian record time of 3:10.11. For the 100 metre backstroke, he placed fourth in the morning final on day three with an Italian record time of 52.30 seconds, after setting an Italian record of 52.49 seconds in the preliminary heats on day one. In the evening of day three, he swam a personal best time of 47.71 seconds in the preliminary heats of the 100 metre freestyle to qualify for the semifinals ranking first. The following day, in the semifinals, he went on to place twelfth with a time of 48.05 seconds, which was 0.94 seconds slower than the fastest swimmer in the semifinals Kliment Kolesnikov of Russia, and did not advance to the event final.

On 31 July, Ceccon helped achieve a fourth-place finish in the 4×100 metre mixed medley relay, swimming the backstroke portion of the relay in 52.23 seconds to contribute to the final mark, and Italian record time, of 3:39.28. The following day, he won a bronze medal as part of the 4×100 metre medley relay, finishing in an Italian record time of 3:29.17 with finals relay teammates Nicolò Martinenghi (breaststroke), Federico Burdisso (butterfly), and Alessandro Miressi (freestyle).

==== 2021 World Short Course Championships ====
On day one of the 2021 World Short Course Championships, held in December at Etihad Arena in Abu Dhabi, United Arab Emirates, Ceccon placed ninth in the semifinals of the 100 metre backstroke with a time of 50.22 seconds. In the same session, he split a 45.71 for the second leg of the 4×100 metre freestyle relay to help win the silver medal in an Italian record time of 3:03.61. Three days later, he started the evening session off with a bronze medal in the 100 metre individual medley with a time of 51.40 seconds and a placing of twelfth in the semifinals of the 50 metre butterfly with a time of 22.74 seconds. For his third and final event of the evening, he helped set a new Italian record of 6:51.48 in the final of the 4×200 metre freestyle relay to place fourth, splitting a 1:44.23 for the second leg of the relay. The second-to-last day of competition, he won a bronze medal in the 4×50 metre medley relay, contributing a split of 21.11 for the freestyle leg of the relay in the preliminaries before being substituted out for Lorenzo Zazzeri in the final. On the final day, he split a 50.96 for the backstroke portion of the 4×100 metre medley relay in the preliminaries before Lorenzo Mora substituted in for him on the finals relay and all relay members won a gold medal when the finals relay finished first in 3:19.76.

=== 2022 ===
==== 2022 World Aquatics Championships ====
At the 2022 World Aquatics Championships, held in June in Budapest, Hungary, Ceccon won a bronze medal as part of the 4×100 metre freestyle relay on the first day of pool swimming competition. For the 50 metre butterfly, Ceccon placed fifth in the final on day two with a time of 22.86 seconds, after setting a new Italian record time of 22.79 seconds in the semifinals to qualify for the final ranking second. One day later, day three, he won the gold medal in the 100 metre backstroke with a world record time of 51.60 seconds. His world record was the first world record set in swimming at the 2022 World Aquatics Championships. On the fourth day, he helped place fifth in the 4×100 metre mixed medley relay, leading off the relay with a 52.26 for the backstroke portion of the relay to contribute to the final time of 3:41.67.

In the 50 metre backstroke final on day eight, Ceccon won the bronze medal and received his medal at the medals ceremony before a swimmer from the United States who was disqualified for an illegal finish during the race had his disqualification overturned and bumped the bronze medal from Ceccon to Ksawery Masiuk of Poland. The same day, he won a gold medal in the 4×100 metre medley relay, splitting a 51.93 for the backstroke leg of the relay in the final to help achieve a European record time of 3:27.51.

==== 2022 European Aquatics Championships ====
Two months later, at the 2022 European Aquatics Championships in Rome, Ceccon qualified for the semifinals of the 50 metre butterfly ranking fifth with a time of 23.38 seconds in the morning preliminaries on day one. Speeding up to a 23.14 in the semifinals, he qualified for the final ranking third. On the second day, he ranked fourteenth in the preliminaries of the 100 metre freestyle with a time of 48.92 seconds and did not advance to the semifinals as he was not one of the two fastest swimmers representing Italy. Later in the day, in the final of the 50 metre butterfly, he won the gold medal, finishing 0.08 seconds ahead of silver medalist Maxime Grousset of France with a time of 22.89 seconds. For his final event of the evening, he swam a 52.82 for the backstroke leg of the 4×100 metre mixed medley relay in the final, helping win the silver medal with a time of 3:43.61.

Finishing with a time of 24.69 seconds in the morning prelims heats of the 50 metre backstroke on day four, Ceccon qualified ranking first for the semifinals, joined by fellow Italian Michele Lamberti who ranked fifth. For the semifinals, he swam a 24.65 and qualified for the final ranking second. Concluding day four, he won a gold medal as part of the 4×100 metre freestyle relay, contributing a split time of 47.80 seconds for the second leg of the relay to the final time of 3:10.50. The following day, he won the silver medal in the 50 metre backstroke with an Italian record time of 24.40 seconds, finishing 0.04 seconds behind gold medalist Apostolos Christou of Greece. In the prelims heats of the 100 metre backstroke the next day, he ranked first with a time of 53.71 seconds and qualified for the semifinals. He ranked third in the semifinals and qualified for the final with a time of 53.48 seconds. For the final of the 100 metre backstroke, on the final day, he dropped his time down to 52.21 seconds and won the gold medal. Approximately 75 minutes later, he won a gold medal as part of the 4×100 metre medley relay, contributing a time of 52.82 for the backstroke leg of the relay to help set a new Championships record of 3:28.46.

==== 2022 Swimming World Cup ====
Commencing the 2022 FINA Swimming World Cup in Berlin, Germany on day one, the first day of his first FINA Swimming World Cup, Ceccon won the gold medal in the 100 metre individual medley with a time of 51.52 seconds, finishing 0.10 seconds ahead of silver medalist Matthew Sates of South Africa. The following day, he achieved a silver medal in the 50 metre backstroke with a personal best time of 23.22 seconds, finishing less than one-tenth of a second behind gold medalist Dylan Carter of Trinidad and Tobago. On the third day, he won the silver medal in the 100 metre backstroke with his first Italian record in the short course 100 metre backstroke and a personal best time of 49.62 seconds, finishing 0.08 seconds behind 2021 World Short Course champion in the event Shaine Casas of the United States. Across all of his performances at the stop, he earned 52.6 points, ranking as the sixth highest-scoring male competitor, 0.8 points behind fifth-ranked Kyle Chalmers of Australia and 3.7 points ahead of seventh-ranked Shaine Casas.

Day one of stop two, held in Toronto, Canada, Ceccon finished in a time of 51.69 seconds in the final of the 100 metre individual medley to win the silver medal 0.66 seconds behind Shaine Casas. He snatched up another silver medal in the final of the 100 metre freestyle the following day, finishing 0.63 seconds behind gold medalist Kyle Chalmers and 0.17 seconds ahead of bronze medalist Brooks Curry of the United States in a personal best time of 46.15 seconds. For the 50 metre butterfly on day three, he won the bronze medal with a time of 22.60 seconds, sharing the podium with Dylan Carter (gold medalist) and Chad le Clos of South Africa (silver medalist).

The third and find stop, starting 3 November in Indianapolis, United States, Ceccon won his first medal of the stop on the second day of competition, achieving a time of 46.27 seconds in the final of the 100 metre freestyle to win the silver medal 0.72 seconds behind gold medalist Kyle Chalmers and 0.55 seconds ahead of bronze medalist Drew Kibler of the United States. Achieving a score of 144.8 points for the three stops of the World Cup circuit, he ranked as the seventh overall highest-scoring male competitor.

==== 2022 World Short Course Championships ====
Ceccon placed nineteenth in the 50 metre butterfly on day one of the 2022 World Short Course Championships, held in December in Melbourne, Australia, with a time of 22.57 seconds. In the evening session, he anchored the 4×100 metre freestyle relay to a gold medal-win in a new world record time of 3:02.75 with a time of 45.13 seconds. For the final of the 100 metre freestyle on day three, he placed fifth with a personal best time of 45.72 seconds. He also won a silver medal in the 4×50 metre freestyle relay in the same session, splitting a 20.67 for the third leg of the relay to contribute to the final time of 1:23.48. On day four, he won his first individual gold medal in the 100 metre individual medley, finishing first with a personal best time of 50.97 seconds. He followed up with a 1:42.61 on the second leg of the 4×200 metre freestyle relay in the final to help achieve a new Italian record time of 6:49.63 and win the bronze medal.

On the morning of day five, Ceccon swam the butterfly leg of the 4×50 metre medley relay in the preliminaries, splitting a 21.80 to contribute to a first-ranked and final-qualifying time of 1:32.31. For the finals relay, Matteo Rivolta took his place for the butterfly leg and he won a gold medal for his efforts when the relay placed first with a time of 1:29.72. In the preliminaries of the 4×100 metre medley relay on the sixth and final day, he achieved a personal best time of 49.59 seconds on the backstroke leg of the relay and helped qualify the relay to the final ranking third in 3:23.81. He won a bronze medal when the finals relay, on which Lorenzo Mora took his place, finished third in a time of 3:19.06.

=== 2023 ===
For the 50 metre backstroke on day one of the 2023 Italian National Spring Championships in Riccione, 13 April, Ceccon won the gold medal with a time of 24.93 seconds, finishing 0.02 seconds ahead of silver medalist Michele Lamberti. For his first event on the second day, he won the gold medal in the 100 metre backstroke with a 2023 World Aquatics Championships qualifying time of 53.36 seconds, sharing the podium with silver medalist Michele Lamberti and bronze medalist Lorenzo Mora. In his second event of the evening, he won a bronze medal in the 4×200 metre freestyle relay, splitting a 1:48.97 for the anchor leg of the relay to contribute to a final time of 7:17.89. The third day, he swam the butterfly leg of the GS Fiamme Oro 4×100 metre medley relay in 52.22 seconds, helping win the gold medal in a time of 3:34.68 with teammates Simone Stefani (backstroke), Simone Cerasuolo (breaststroke), and Alessandro Miressi (freestyle). In the b-final of the 200 metre freestyle on day four, he placed second, finishing in a time of 1:49.44. He concluded with a national title in the 4×100 metre freestyle relay on the fifth and final day with GS Fiamme Oro teammates Alessandro Miressi, Manuel Frigo, and Marco Orsi, anchoring the relay to victory with a 47.83 that contributed to a final time of 3:14.60, which set a new Italian club record time for the event.

In May, at the stop of the 2023 Mare Nostrum in Barcelona, Spain, Ceccon won the 100 metre freestyle with a time of 48.89 seconds in the final.

== International championships (50 m) ==
Meet	50 free	100 free	50 back	100 back	200 back	50 fly	100 fly	200 medley	400 medley	4×100 free	4×200 free	4×100 medley	4×100 mixed free	4×100 mixed medley
Junior level
EJC 2016				20th		34th	58th	29th	35th					
EJC 2017	23rd	43rd	8th	5th				15th		4th		1st place, gold medalist(s)		(gold) ^{[a]}
WJC 2017			10th	9th				31st		7th		2nd place, silver medalist(s)		
EJC 2018	7th		5th	5th	15th			16th		2nd place, silver medalist(s)		3rd place, bronze medalist(s)		
YOG 2018	1st place, gold medalist(s)	18th	2nd place, silver medalist(s)	3rd place, bronze medalist(s)		4th		2nd place, silver medalist(s)	—N/a	3rd place, bronze medalist(s)		5th		
EJC 2019	3rd (h)	15th	1st place, gold medalist(s)	1st place, gold medalist(s)						2nd place, silver medalist(s)	6th	2nd place, silver medalist(s)	3rd place, bronze medalist(s)	5th
WJC 2019			3rd place, bronze medalist(s)	1st place, gold medalist(s)		1st place, gold medalist(s)		12th		3rd place, bronze medalist(s)		DSQ	3rd place, bronze medalist(s)	
Senior level
EC 2018			16th	5th								9th		
WC 2019			26th	17th				52nd						
EC 2020			14th	6th		8th				3rd place, bronze medalist(s)		3rd place, bronze medalist(s)	3rd place, bronze medalist(s)	
OG 2020	—N/a	12th	—N/a	4th		—N/a				2nd place, silver medalist(s)		3rd place, bronze medalist(s)	—N/a	4th
WC 2022			4th	1st place, gold medalist(s)		5th				3rd place, bronze medalist(s)		1st place, gold medalist(s)		5th
EC 2022		14th	2nd place, silver medalist(s)	1st place, gold medalist(s)		1st place, gold medalist(s)				1st place, gold medalist(s)		1st place, gold medalist(s)		2nd place, silver medalist(s)

^{a} Ceccon swam only in the preliminaries.

== International championships (25 m) ==
Meet	100 free	50 back	100 back	50 fly	100 medley	200 medley	4×50 free	4×100 free	4×200 free	4×50 medley	4×100 medley	4×50 mixed medley
EC 2017			39th		27th	33rd		—N/a	—N/a		—N/a	
WC 2018			15th			20th						
EC 2019	DNS	60th		11th	4th	12th	(bronze) ^{[a]}	—N/a	—N/a		—N/a	10th
EC 2021	DNS			3rd place, bronze medalist(s)	10th	2nd place, silver medalist(s)	2nd place, silver medalist(s)	—N/a	—N/a	(gold) ^{[a]}	—N/a	
WC 2021			9th	12th	3rd place, bronze medalist(s)			2nd place, silver medalist(s)	4th	(bronze) ^{[a]}	(gold) ^{[a]}	
WC 2022	5th			19th	1st place, gold medalist(s)		2nd place, silver medalist(s)	1st place, gold medalist(s)	3rd place, bronze medalist(s)	(gold) ^{[a]}	(bronze) ^{[a]}	

^{a} Ceccon swam only in the preliminaries.

== Personal best times ==
=== Long course metres (50 m pool) ===
Event	Time		Meet	Location	Date	Notes	Ref
100 m freestyle	47.71	h	2020 Summer Olympics	Tokyo, Japan	27 July 2021		
200 m freestyle	1:46.52		2023 Luxembourg Euro Meet	Luxembourg	29 January 2023		
50 m backstroke	24.40		2022 European Aquatics Championships	Rome	15 August 2022	NR	
100 m backstroke	51.60		2022 World Aquatics Championships	Budapest, Hungary	20 June 2022	WR	
50 m butterfly	22.79	sf	2022 World Aquatics Championships	Budapest, Hungary	18 June 2022	NR	

Legend: WR – World record; NR – Italian record;
Records not set in finals: h – heat; sf – semifinal; r – relay 1st leg; rh – relay heat 1st leg; b – B final; † – en route to final mark; so – swim-off; tt – time trial

=== Short course metres (25 m pool) ===
Event	Time		Meet	Location	Date	Notes	Ref
100 m freestyle	45.72		2022 World Short Course Championships	Melbourne, Australia	15 December 2022		
50 m backstroke	23.22		2022 Swimming World Cup	Berlin, Germany	22 October 2022		
100 m backstroke	49.59	h, r	2022 World Short Course Championships	Melbourne, Australia	18 December 2022		
50 m butterfly	22.19	sf	2021 European Short Course Championships	Kazan, Russia	5 November 2021	Former NR	
100 m butterfly	50.56		2021 International Swimming League	Naples	25 September 2021		
100 m individual medley	50.97		2022 World Short Course Championships	Melbourne, Australia	16 December 2022		
200 m individual medley	1:52.49		2021 European Short Course Championships	Kazan, Russia	5 November 2021	Former NR	

Legend: NR – Italian record;
Records not set in finals: h – heat; sf – semifinal; r – relay 1st leg; rh – relay heat 1st leg; b – B final; † – en route to final mark; so – swim-off; tt – time trial

== Swimming World Cup circuits ==
The following medals Ceccon has won at Swimming World Cup circuits.

Edition	Gold medals	Silver medals	Bronze medals	Total
2022	1	5	1	7
Total	1	5	1	7

== World records ==
=== Long course metres (50 m pool) ===
No.	Event	Time	Meet	Location	Date	Status	Ref
1	100 m backstroke	51.60	2022 World Aquatics Championships	Budapest, Hungary	20 June 2022	Current	

=== Short course metres (25 m pool) ===
No.	Event	Time	Meet	Location	Date	Status	Ref
1	4×100 m freestyle	3:02.75	2022 World Short Course Championships	Melbourne, Australia	13 December 2022	Current	

== See also ==
- List of Youth Olympic Games gold medalists who won Olympic gold medals

Records
Preceded by (United States) Ryan Murphy	Men's 100-metre backstroke world record-holder (long course); 20 June 2022 – present	Succeeded by Incumbent
