= Michele Lamberti =

Italian swimmer (born 2000)

Personal information
- National team: Italy
- Born: 3 November 2000 (age 25) Brescia, Italy
- Height: 1.83 m (6 ft 0 in)
- Weight: 75 kg (165 lb)

Sport
- Sport: Swimming
- Strokes: Backstroke, butterfly
- Club: GS Fiamme Gialle
- Coach: Giorgio Lamberti
Medal record
Men's swimming
Representing Italy
| Event | 1st | 2nd | 3rd |
|---|---|---|---|
| World Championships (LC) | 0 | 0 | 1 |
| World Championships (SC) | 0 | 0 | 2 |
| European Championships (LC) | 1 | 2 | 0 |
| European Championships (SC) | 1 | 3 | 1 |
| Total | 2 | 5 | 4 |
World Championships (LC)
| Bronze medal – third place | 2024 Doha | 4×100 m medley |
World Championships (SC)
| Bronze medal – third place | 2021 Abu Dhabi | 4×50 m mixed medley |
| Bronze medal – third place | 2021 Abu Dhabi | 4×50 m medley |
European Championships (LC)
| Gold medal – first place | 2022 Roma | 4×100 m medley |
| Silver medal – second place | 2022 Rome | 4×100 m mixed medley |
| Silver medal – second place | 2026 Paris | 4×100 m medley |
European Championships (SC)
| Gold medal – first place | 2021 Kazan | 4×50 m medley |
| Silver medal – second place | 2021 Kazan | 50 m backstroke |
| Silver medal – second place | 2021 Kazan | 100 m butterfly |
| Silver medal – second place | 2021 Kazan | 4×50 m mixed medley |
| Bronze medal – third place | 2021 Kazan | 200 m backstroke |
World University Games
| Silver medal – second place | 2021 Chengdu | 100 m backstroke |
| Silver medal – second place | 2021 Chengdu | 4×100 m medley |
| Bronze medal – third place | 2021 Chengdu | 50 m backstroke |

Michele Lamberti (born 3 November 2000) is a competitive Italian swimmer. He is a former world record holder in the short course 4×50-metre medley relay. He currently holds the Italian record in the short course 50-metre backstroke. At the 2021 European Short Course Championships he won a gold medal and set a world record in the 4×50-metre medley relay, won three silver medals, one in the 50-metre backstroke, one in the 100-metre butterfly, and one in the 4×50-metre mixed medley relay, and won a bronze medal in the 200-metre backstroke. At the 2021 World Short Course Championships he won two bronze medals in relay events, swimming in the preliminaries for each relay.

== Background ==
Lamberti was born 3 November 2000 in Brescia, Italy, to father Giorgio Lamberti a former world record holder and world champion in the short course 200-metre freestyle. He also has two siblings, Noemi and Matteo, both of whom are competitive swimmers. His mother, Tanya Vannini, was also a competitive swimmer at the international level. Lamberti is coached by his father, Giorgio Lamberti.

== Career ==
=== 2021 ===
==== 2021 European Short Course Championships ====
2021 European Championships (SC)
| Gold medal – first place | 4x50 m medley relay | 1:30.14 (WR) |
| Silver medal – second place | 50 m backstroke | 22.65 (NR) |
| Silver medal – second place | 100 m butterfly | 49.79 |
| Silver medal – second place | 4×50 m mixed medley relay | 1:36.39 (NR) |
| Bronze medal – third place | 200 m backstroke | 1:50.26 |

At the 2021 European Short Course Swimming Championships held at the Palace of Water Sports in Kazan, Russia in November, Lamberti started his competition on day one with an Italian record of 22.91 seconds in the 50-metre backstroke prelims heats that qualified him for the semifinals later the same day. In the same prelims session, Lamberti qualified for the semifinals of the 100-metre butterfly with a time of 50.17 seconds. In the evening semifinals session, he set a new Italian record in the 50-metre backstroke with his time of 22.79 seconds and advanced to the final ranked second. For the 100-metre butterfly semifinals, he advanced to the final with a personal best time of 50.11 seconds.

On day two of competition, 3 November, Lamberti made it three-for-three setting his third Italian record in the 50-metre backstroke in the third stage of competition, the final, with a time of 22.65 seconds, which earned him the silver medal in the event. He won the silver medal in his second event of the same finals session, the 100-metre butterfly, with a time of 49.79 seconds. In his third and final event of the session, Lamberti earned his first gold medal and set a Championships record and world record of 1:30.14 in the 4×50-metre medley relay with relay teammates Nicolò Martinenghi (breaststroke), Marco Orsi (butterfly), and Lorenzo Zazzeri (freestyle). Lamberti was the only person on the relay to lower the world record split for their stroke by more than two tenths of a second and he also set his fourth Italian record in the 50-metre backstroke with his lead-off time of 22.62 seconds.

The third day, Lamberti swam a personal best time of 50.86 seconds in the prelims heats of the 100 metre backstroke, ranked seventh overall, and did not advance to the semifinals as he was not one of the two fastest Italians in the event. Fourth day of competition, a similar situation arose, Lamberti swam a personal best time of 22.81 seconds in the 50-metre butterfly prelims heats, ranking behind Italians Matteo Rivolta and Thomas Ceccon and thus not advancing to the semifinals even though he ranked twelfth overall. Day five, he advanced to the semifinals of the 200-metre backstroke with a time of 1:54.45 in the prelims heats, which ranked him ninth amongst semifinals qualifiers and eleventh overall. In the semifinals, he dropped almost two and a half seconds off his prelims time, swimming a 1:52.01 and advancing the final.

Lamberti swam a 1:50.26 in the final of the 200-metre backstroke on the sixth and final day of competition, lowering his personal best time from the semifinals by over a second and a half, and winning the bronze medal in the event. In the final of the 4×50-metre mixed medley relay, Lamberti split a time of 22.72 seconds for the backstroke leg of the relay to win the silver medal and achieve a new Italian record at 1:36.39 in the event with his relay teammates of Nicolò Martinenghi (breaststroke), Elena Di Liddo (butterfly), and Silvia Di Pietro (freestyle).

==== 2021 Nico Sapio Trophy ====
At the 47th Nico Sapio Trophy held in Genoa, Lamberti won the gold medal in the short course 200 metre butterfly with a personal best time of 1:53.94, which was a drop of 2.01 seconds from his previous best time in the race. Earlier in the competition, Lamberti won the bronze medal in the 200 metre freestyle with a time of 1:46.53, which was 1.00 seconds behind his brother and silver medalist in the event Matteo Lamberti.

==== 2021 World Short Course Championships ====
2021 World Championships (SC)
| Bronze medal – third place | 4×50 m mixed medley | 1:37.29 (h) |
| Bronze medal – third place | 4×50 m medley | 1:30.78 (h) |

Two weeks before the start of competition at the 2021 World Short Course Championships in Abu Dhabi, United Arab Emirates, Lamberti and his brother were named to the Italian roster for the Championships. He entered to compete in the 50 metre backstroke, 200 metre backstroke, and 100 metre butterfly individual events. Starting competition on day two, Lamberti ranked 14th in the prelims heats of the 100 metre butterfly with a time of 50.53 seconds and qualified for the semifinals of the event. In the evening semifinals, Lamberti swam a 50.12, ranked 12th overall and did not advance to the final. The morning of day three, Lamberti advanced to the semifinals ranking tenth in the prelims heats of the 50 metre backstroke with a 23.50. In his second event of the morning, Lamberti split a 23.44 for the backstroke leg of the 4×50 metre mixed medley relay, helping to achieve a rank of fourth and qualify the relay to the final. Later in the day, Lamberti swam a 23.15 in the semifinals of the 50 metre backstroke to qualify for the final ranking sixth. For the final of the 4×50 metre mixed medley relay, Lorenzo Mora substituted in for Lamberti for the backstroke leg of the relay, the finals relay finished third, and all prelims and finals relay members won a bronze medal.

On day four, Lamberti placed fifth in the final of the 50 metre backstroke with a time of 22.94 seconds. The following day Lamberti split a 22.84 for the butterfly leg of the 4×50 metre medley relay, helping advance the relay to the final ranking fifth overall at 1:33.60. In the final, Matteo Rivolta substituted in for Lamberti, the finals relay placed third in 1:30.78, and Lamberti won a bronze medal for his contributions in the prelims heats. In the morning prelims heats on the sixth and final day of competition, Lamberti did not qualify for the final of the 200 metre backstroke with his time of 1:52.52 and ranking of eleventh.

=== 2022 ===
==== 2022 World Aquatics Championships ====
As part of the 4×100 metre mixed medley relay at the 2022 World Aquatics Championships, with pool swimming conducted at Danube Arena in Budapest, Hungary in June, Lamberti split a 54.40 for the backstroke leg of the relay in the preliminaries to help qualify the relay for the final ranking seventh. For the finals relay, Thomas Ceccon substituted in for him on the backstroke leg of the relay and the relay placed fifth in a time of 3:41.67. The following day, he placed 21st in the 200 metre backstroke with a time of 2:00.92. On 24 June, he swam a time of 25.16 seconds in the preliminaries of the 50 metre backstroke, tying for sixteenth rank. In the semifinals, he lowered his time to 24.86 seconds and placed eleventh.

==== 2022 European Aquatics Championships ====
2022 European Championships (LC)
| Gold medal – first place | 4×100 m medley | 3:28.46 (h) |
| Silver medal – second place | 4×100 m mixed medley | 3:43.61 (h) |

The month following the World Championships, Lamberti was officially confirmed as a swim team member for Italy for the 2022 European Aquatics Championships in August in Rome. The second day of competition, he led-off the 4×100 metre mixed medley relay in the prelims heats with a 54.67, helping qualify the relay to the final ranking sixth. On the finals relay, Thomas Ceccon substituted in for him and he won a silver medal for his contributions when the relay placed second in a time of 3:43.61. Two days later, in the preliminaries of the 50 metre backstroke, he qualified for the semifinals ranking fifth with a time of 24.88 seconds. In the semifinals, he retained his fifth-rank, lowering his time to a 24.82 and qualifying for the final. He placed fifth in the final as well, this time finishing in a time of 24.85 seconds. The following day, he ranked sixth in the preliminaries of the 100 metre backstroke, qualifying for the semifinals with a time of 54.37 seconds. He finished with a time of 54.56 seconds in the semifinals, placing thirteenth and not advancing to the final. On the seventh and final day, Lamberti helped qualify the 4×100 metre medley relay to the final ranking first with a time of 3:34.35, swimming the backstroke portion of the relay in 54.95 seconds. In the final, he was substituted out, Thomas Ceccon in, and he won a gold medal for his efforts when the finals relay placed first with a time of 3:28.46.

=== 2023 ===
Starting off in the 50 metre backstroke on day one of the 2023 Italian National Spring Championships in April in Riccione, Lamberti took second-place behind Thomas Ceccon with a time of 24.95 seconds. On the second evening, he won the silver medal in the 100 metre backstroke with 54.52, which was behind gold medalist Thomas Ceccon and ahead of bronze medalist Lorenzo Mora. The following day, he won a silver medal in the 4×100 metre medley relay as part of the GS Fiamme Gialle relay team, contributing a time of 54.57 for the backstroke portion to a final time of 3:36.58. On the evening of day four, he placed eighth in the final of the 100 metre butterfly with a time of 53.29 seconds.

== International championships (50 m) ==
| Meet | 50 back | 100 back | 200 back | 4×100 medley | 4×100 mixed medley |
|---|---|---|---|---|---|
| WC 2022 (age: 21) | 11th (24.86) | | 21st (2:00.92) | | 5th^{[a]} (split 54.40, bk leg) |
| EC 2022 (age: 21) | 5th (24.85) | 13th (54.56) | | (gold) ^{[a]} (split 54.95, bk leg) | (silver) ^{[a]} (split 54.67, bk leg) |

^{a} Lamberti swam only in the prelims heats.

== International championships (25 m) ==
| Meet | 50 back | 100 back | 200 back | 50 fly | 100 fly | 4×50 medley | 4×50 mixed medley |
|---|---|---|---|---|---|---|---|
| EC 2021 (age: 20 turned 21) | (silver) (22.65 NR) | 7th (h) (50.86) | (bronze) (1:50.26) | 12th (h) (22.81) | (silver) (49.79) | (gold) (1:30.14 WR; split 22.62 NR, bk leg) | (silver) (1:36.39 NR; split 22.72, bk leg) |
| WC 2021 (age: 21) | 5th (22.94) | | 11th (1:52.52) | | 12th (50.12) | (bronze) ^{[a]} (split 22.84, fl leg) | (bronze) ^{[a]} (split 23.44, bk leg) |

^{a} Lamberti swam only in the prelims heats.

== Personal best times ==
=== Long course metres (50 m pool) ===
| Event | Time | Meet | Location | Date | Ref |
|---|---|---|---|---|---|
| 50 m backstroke | 24.47 | Campionato Italiano Assoluto | Riccione | 5 March 2024 | |
| 100 m backstroke | 53.73 | 2024 World Aquatics Championships | Doha | 12 February 2024 | |
| 200 m backstroke | 1:58.40 | 58th Settecolli Trophy | Rome | 27 June 2021 | |
| 100 m butterfly | 52.06 | 58th Settecolli Trophy | Rome | 25 June 2021 | |

Legend: sf – semifinal

=== Short course metres (25 m pool) ===
| Event | Time | | Meet | Location | Date | Notes | Ref |
|---|---|---|---|---|---|---|---|
| 200 m freestyle | 1:46.53 | | 47th Nico Sapio Trophy | Genoa | 19 November 2021 | | |
| 50 m backstroke | 22.62 | r | 2021 European Short Course Championships | Kazan, Russia | 3 November 2021 | NR | |
| 100 m backstroke | 50.86 | h | 2021 European Short Course Championships | Kazan, Russia | 4 November 2021 | | |
| 200 m backstroke | 1:50.26 | | 2021 European Short Course Championships | Kazan, Russia | 7 November 2021 | | |
| 50 m butterfly | 22.81 | h | 2021 European Short Course Championships | Kazan, Russia | 5 November 2021 | | |
| 100 m butterfly | 49.79 | | 2021 European Short Course Championships | Kazan, Russia | 3 November 2021 | | |
| 200 m butterfly | 1:53.94 | | 47th Nico Sapio Trophy | Genoa | 20 November 2021 | | |

Legend: NR – Italian record;
Records not set in finals: h – heat; sf – semifinal; r – relay 1st leg; rh – relay heat 1st leg; b – B final; † – en route to final mark; so – swim-off; tt – time trial

== World records ==
=== Short course metres (25 m pool) ===
| No. | Event | Time | Meet | Location | Date | Age | Status | Ref |
|---|---|---|---|---|---|---|---|---|
| 1 | 4×50 m medley relay^{[a]} | 1:30.14 | 2021 European Short Course Championships | Kazan, Russia | 3 November 2021 | 21 | Former | |

^{a} split 22.62 (backstroke); with Nicolò Martinenghi (breaststroke), Marco Orsi (butterfly), Lorenzo Zazzeri (freestyle)

== Continental and national records ==
=== Short course metres (25 m pool) ===
| No. | Event | Time | | Meet | Location | Date | Age | Type | Status | Notes | Ref |
|---|---|---|---|---|---|---|---|---|---|---|---|
| 1 | 50 m backstroke | 22.91 | h | 2021 European Short Course Championships | Kazan, Russia | 2 November 2021 | 20 | NR | Former | | |
| 2 | 50 m backstroke (2) | 22.79 | sf | 2021 European Short Course Championships | Kazan, Russia | 2 November 2021 | 20 | NR | Former | | |
| 3 | 50 m backstroke (3) | 22.65 | | 2021 European Short Course Championships | Kazan, Russia | 3 November 2021 | 21 | NR | Former | | |
| 4 | 50 m backstroke (4) | 22.62 | r | 2021 European Short Course Championships | Kazan, Russia | 3 November 2021 | 21 | NR | Current | | |
| 5 | 4×50 m medley relay | 1:30.14 | | 2021 European Short Course Championships | Kazan, Russia | 3 November 2021 | 21 | ER, NR | Former | Former WR | |
| 6 | 4×50 m mixed medley relay | 1:36.39 | | 2021 European Short Course Championships | Kazan, Russia | 7 November 2021 | 21 | NR | Former | | |

Legend: WR – World record; ER – European record; NR – Italian record;
Records not set in finals: h – heat; sf – semifinal; r – relay 1st leg; rh – relay heat 1st leg; b – B final; † – en route to final mark; so – swim-off; tt – time trial

== See also ==
- List of world records in swimming
- World record progression 4 × 50 metres medley relay
- List of European Short Course Swimming Championships medalists (men)

Records
| Preceded by (Russia) Kliment Kolesnikov, Kirill Prigoda, Aleksandr Popkov, Vladimir Morozov | Men's 4×50-metre medley relay world record holder 3 November 2021 – 17 December 2022; With: Nicolò Martinenghi, Marco Orsi, Lorenzo Zazzeri | Succeeded by (Italy) Lorenzo Mora, Nicolò Martinenghi; Matteo Rivolta, Leonardo Deplano |
