= Pavel Samusenko =

Russian swimmer

Personal information
- Nationality: Russian
- Born: 9 August 2001 (age 25)

Sport
- Sport: Swimming
Medal record
Men's swimming
Representing Neutral Athletes B
World Championships (LC)
Silver medal – second place	2025 Singapore	50 m backstroke
World Championships (SC)
Gold medal – first place	2024 Budapest	4×100 m medley
Gold medal – first place	2024 Budapest	4×50 m mixed medley
Gold medal – first place	2024 Budapest	4×100 m mixed medley
European Championships (LC)
Gold medal – first place	2026 Paris	4×100 m medley
Bronze medal – third place	2026 Paris	50 m backstroke
Bronze medal – third place	2026 Paris	100 m backstroke
Bronze medal – third place	2026 Paris	4×100 m mixed medley
Representing Russian Swimming Federation
World Championships (SC)
Gold medal – first place	2021 Abu Dhabi	4×50 m medley
Bronze medal – third place	2021 Abu Dhabi	4×100 m medley
Representing Russia
World Junior Championships
Silver medal – second place	2019 Budapest	4×100 m freestyle
Silver medal – second place	2019 Budapest	4×100 m mixed freestyle
Silver medal – second place	2019 Budapest	4×100 m mixed medley
European Junior Championships
Gold medal – first place	2019 Kazan	4×100 m medley
Bronze medal – third place	2019 Kazan	50 m backstroke

Pavel Samusenko (born 9 August 2001) is a Russian swimmer. He competed in the men's 4 × 50 metre medley relay event at the 2021 FINA World Swimming Championships (25 m) in Abu Dhabi.
