= Miroslav Knedla =

German swimmer (born 2005)

Personal information
- Nationality: Czech
- Born: 18 July 2005 (age 21) Ostrava, Czech Republic

Sport
- Sport: Swimming
- Strokes: Backstroke
- College team: Indiana University
Medal record
Men's swimming
Representing Czech Republic
European Championships (LC)
Gold medal – first place	2026 Paris	50 m backstroke
World Junior Championships
Gold medal – first place	2023 Netanya	50 m backstroke
Silver medal – second place	2023 Netanya	100 m backstroke
Bronze medal – third place	2022 Lima	50 m backstroke
Bronze medal – third place	2022 Lima	100 m backstroke
European Junior Championships
Gold medal – first place	2023 Belgrade	50 m backstroke
Gold medal – first place	2023 Belgrade	200 m individual medley
European U23 Championships
Bronze medal – third place	2023 Dublin	50 m backstroke

Miroslav Knedla (born 18 July 2005) is a Czech swimmer. He competes at the collegiate level for the Indiana Hoosiers.

== Life ==
Knedla was born in Ostrava. He was raised in the Zlín swimming club.

== Career ==
In July 2023, Knedla competed at the 2023 European Junior Swimming Championships and won a gold medal in the 50 metre backstroke with a time of 24.88 seconds. He also won a gold medal in the 200 metre individual medley with a Czech record time of 2:00.26. The next month he competed at the 2023 European U-23 Swimming Championships and won a bronze medal in the 50 metre backstroke with a time of 25.30 seconds.

In September 2023, he competed at the 2023 World Aquatics Junior Swimming Championships and won a gold medal in the 50 metre backstroke and a silver medal in the 100 metre backstroke. In December 2023, he committed to swim collegiately for the Indiana Hoosiers.

In August 2026, he competed at the 2026 European Aquatics Championships and won a gold medal in the 50 metre backstroke with a time of 24.11 seconds, improving the Czech national record. He also competed in the mixed 4 × 100 metre freestyle relay and finished in fifth place.
