= Francesca Fangio =

Italian swimmer (born 1995)

Personal information
- Nationality: Italian
- Born: 17 August 1995 (age 30) Livorno, Italy

Sport
- Sport: Swimming
Medal record
Women's swimming
Representing Italy
Event	1st	2nd	3rd
European Championships (LC)	0	1	0
Total	0	1	0
European Championships (LC)
Silver medal – second place	2022 Rome	4×100 m mixed medley

Francesca Fangio (born 17 August 1995) is an Italian swimmer.

== Career ==
She competed at the 2020 and 2024 Summer Olympics, in 200 m breaststroke. She competed in the women's 200 metre breaststroke event at the 2020 European Aquatics Championships, in Budapest, Hungary.
