= Kliment Kolesnikov =

Russian swimmer (born 2000)

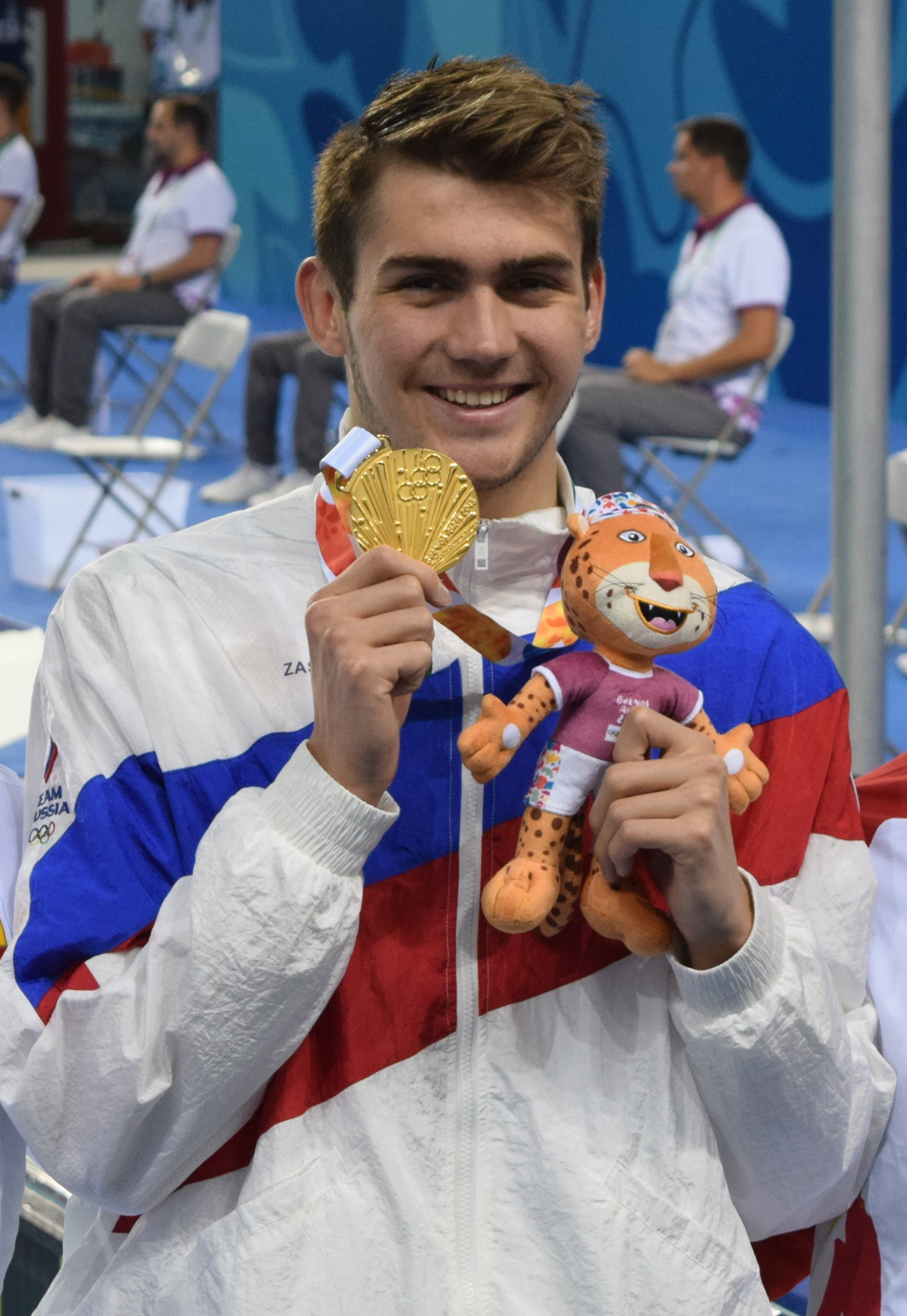
- Kolesnikov in 2018

Personal information
- Nationality: Russian
- Born: 9 July 2000 (age 26) Moscow, Russia
- Height: 1.96 m (6 ft 5 in)
- Weight: 86 kg (190 lb)

Sport
- Sport: Swimming
- Strokes: Freestyle, Backstroke
- Club: Energy Standard
Medal record
Representing (Russia) ROC
Olympic Games
Silver medal – second place	2020 Tokyo	100 m backstroke
Bronze medal – third place	2020 Tokyo	100 m freestyle
Representing Neutral Athletes B
World Championships (LC)
Gold medal – first place	2025 Singapore	50 m backstroke
Gold medal – first place	2025 Singapore	4×100 m medley
European Championships (LC)
Gold medal – first place	2026 Paris	4×100 m medley
Silver medal – second place	2026 Paris	50 m backstroke
Bronze medal – third place	2026 Paris	4×100 m mixed medley
Representing Russian Swimming Federation
World Championships (SC)
Gold medal – first place	2021 Abu Dhabi	100 m medley
Gold medal – first place	2021 Abu Dhabi	50 m backstroke
Gold medal – first place	2021 Abu Dhabi	4×100 m freestyle
Gold medal – first place	2021 Abu Dhabi	4×50 m medley
Silver medal – second place	2021 Abu Dhabi	100 m backstroke
Bronze medal – third place	2021 Abu Dhabi	4×100 m medley
Representing Russia
World Championships (LC)
Silver medal – second place	2019 Gwangju	4×100 m freestyle
Bronze medal – third place	2019 Gwangju	50 m backstroke
Bronze medal – third place	2019 Gwangju	4×100 m medley
World Championships (SC)
Gold medal – first place	2018 Hangzhou	100 m medley
Gold medal – first place	2018 Hangzhou	4×50 m medley
Silver medal – second place	2018 Hangzhou	4×50 m freestyle
Silver medal – second place	2018 Hangzhou	4×100 m freestyle
Silver medal – second place	2018 Hangzhou	4×100 m medley
Bronze medal – third place	2018 Hangzhou	100 m backstroke
Bronze medal – third place	2018 Hangzhou	4×50 m mixed medley
European Championships (LC)
Gold medal – first place	2018 Glasgow	50 m backstroke
Gold medal – first place	2018 Glasgow	100 m backstroke
Gold medal – first place	2018 Glasgow	4×100 m freestyle
Gold medal – first place	2020 Budapest	100 m freestyle
Gold medal – first place	2020 Budapest	50 m backstroke
Gold medal – first place	2020 Budapest	4×100 m freestyle
Silver medal – second place	2018 Glasgow	4×100 m medley
Silver medal – second place	2018 Glasgow	4×100 m mixed medley
Silver medal – second place	2020 Budapest	4×100 m medley
Bronze medal – third place	2018 Glasgow	4×100 m mixed freestyle
European Championships (SC)
Gold medal – first place	2017 Copenhagen	100 m backstroke
Gold medal – first place	2017 Copenhagen	200 m backstroke
Gold medal – first place	2017 Copenhagen	4×50 m freestyle
Gold medal – first place	2017 Copenhagen	4×50 m medley
Gold medal – first place	2019 Glasgow	50 m backstroke
Gold medal – first place	2019 Glasgow	100 m backstroke
Gold medal – first place	2019 Glasgow	100 m medley
Gold medal – first place	2019 Glasgow	4×50 m freestyle
Gold medal – first place	2019 Glasgow	4×50 m medley
Gold medal – first place	2019 Glasgow	4×50 m mixed medley
Gold medal – first place	2021 Kazan	50 m backstroke
Gold medal – first place	2021 Kazan	100 m backstroke
Gold medal – first place	2021 Kazan	100 m freestyle
Silver medal – second place	2017 Copenhagen	50 m backstroke
Silver medal – second place	2017 Copenhagen	4×50 m mixed freestyle
Silver medal – second place	2021 Kazan	4×50 m medley
Bronze medal – third place	2021 Kazan	4×50 m freestyle
Bronze medal – third place	2021 Kazan	4×50 m mixed medley
Summer Youth Olympics
Gold medal – first place	2018 Buenos Aires	50 m backstroke
Gold medal – first place	2018 Buenos Aires	100 m backstroke
Gold medal – first place	2018 Buenos Aires	200 m backstroke
Gold medal – first place	2018 Buenos Aires	4×100 m freestyle
Gold medal – first place	2018 Buenos Aires	4×100 m medley
Gold medal – first place	2018 Buenos Aires	4×100 m mixed freestyle
Silver medal – second place	2018 Buenos Aires	4×100 m mixed medley
European Youth Olympic Festival
Gold medal – first place	2015 Tbilisi	4x100 m freestyle
Bronze medal – third place	2015 Tbilisi	4x100 m mixed freestyle

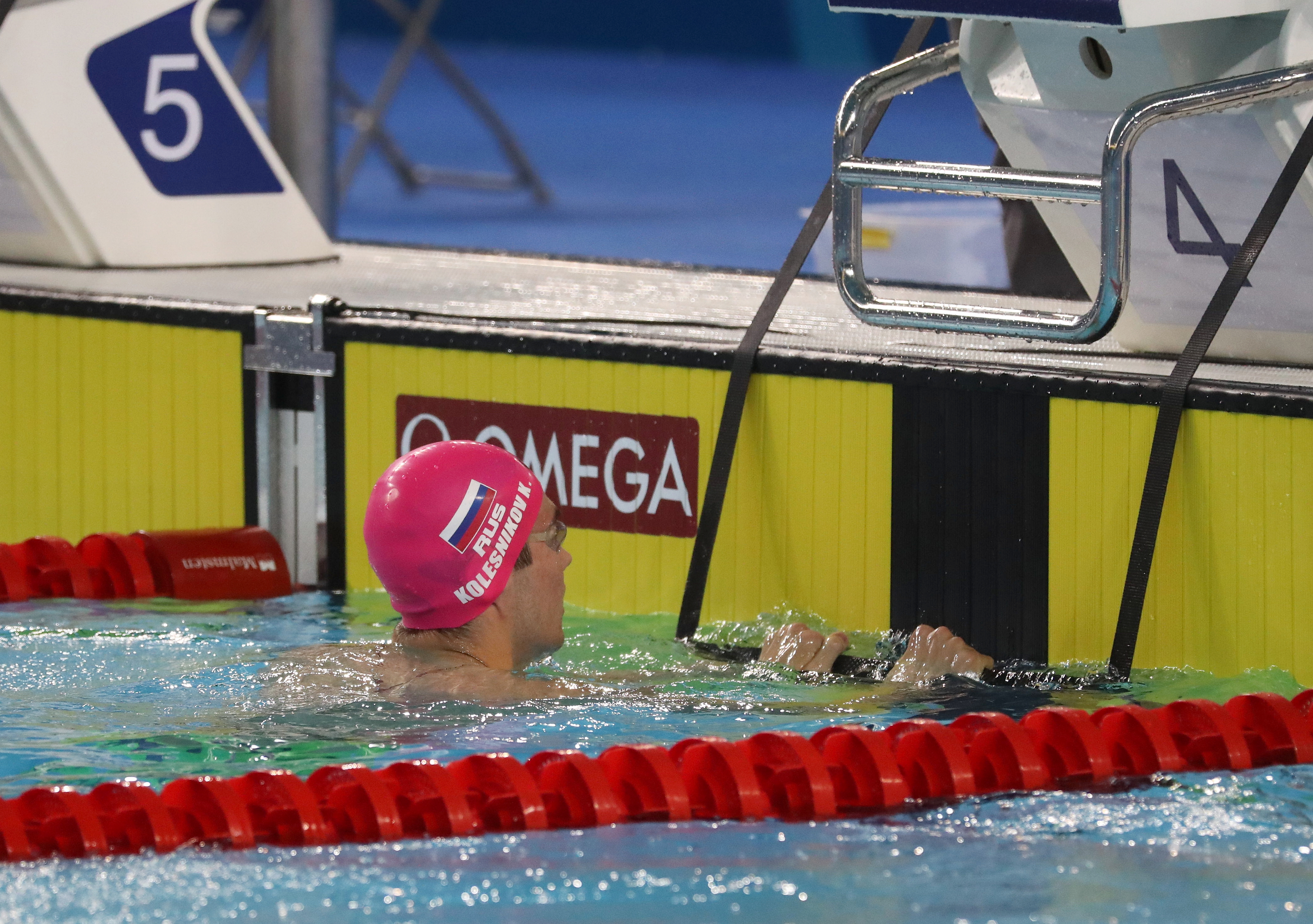
Kolesnikov at the 2018 Summer Youth Olympic Games

Kliment Andreyevich Kolesnikov (Russian: Климент Андреевич Колесников, IPA: [klʲɪˈmʲent kɐˈlʲesʲnʲɪkəf]; born 9 July 2000) is a Russian swimmer. He holds world junior records in eight events: 50/100/200 back in long course, as well as 200 free, 50/100/200 back and 100 IM in short course.

He made his debut at the 2017 World Aquatics Championships, where he competed in three backstroke events and set two world junior records. In December 2017, he set a short course 100m backstroke world record at Vladimir Salnikov Cup, becoming the first swimmer born in the 2000s to hold a world record in an individual event.

He won a total of six medals (3 gold, 2 silver and 1 bronze) at the 2018 European Championships and established a new 50m backstroke world record.

At the 2018 Summer Youth Olympics, Kolesnikov was chosen the flag bearer for Russia. He won a total of six gold medals there.

At the 2023 Russian National Championships, conducted in long course metres in April at the Palace of Water Sports in Kazan, Kolesnikov won the gold medal in the 100 metre backstroke with a time of 52.54 seconds on day two. In the finals session on day four, he first won a gold medal in the 50 metre backstroke with a time of 24.12 seconds, then followed up approximately 75 minutes later with a gold medal in the 50 metre freestyle with a time of 21.91 seconds. On the sixth and final day, he won a bronze medal in the 100 metre freestyle with a 48.54 and a gold medal as part of the Moscow relay team finishing in 3:30.10 in the final of the 4×100 metre medley relay.

== Personal bests ==
=== Long course ===
Event	Time	Location	Date	Note
50 m freestyle (LC)	21.69	Moscow	27 April 2022	
100 m freestyle (LC)	47.11	Tokyo	28 July 2021	NR
50 m backstroke (LC)	23.55	Kazan	27 July 2023	WR
100 m backstroke (LC)	51.82	Kazan	26 July 2023	NR
200 m backstroke (LC)	1:55.14	Budapest	28 July 2017	WJR

=== Short course ===
Event	Time	Location	Date	Note
50 m freestyle (SC)	20.88	Moscow	23 December 2022	
100 m freestyle (SC)	45.58	Kazan	6 November 2021	
200 m freestyle (SC)	1:41.75	Saint Petersburg	23 December 2017	WJR
50 m backstroke (SC)	22.11	Kazan	23 November 2022	WR
100 m backstroke (SC)	48.58	Budapest	21 November 2020	ER, NR (r)
200 m backstroke (SC)	1:48.02	Copenhagen	13 December 2017	WJR
100 m individual medley (SC)	50.63	Hangzhou	14 December 2018	WJR
200 m individual medley (SC)	1:53.36	Kazan	20 November 2017	

Note WR= World Record, WJR= World Junior Record, ER= European Record, NR= Russian National Record, LC= Long course, SC= Short course, r= relay lead-off

Records
Preceded by (United Kingdom) Liam Tancock	Men's 50-meter backstroke world record-holder (long course); 4 August 2018 – 28 April 2022	Succeeded by (United States) Hunter Armstrong
Preceded by (United States) Matt Grevers (China) Xu Jiayu	Men's 100-meter backstroke world record-holder (short course); 22 December 2017 – 11 November 2018; 21 November 2020 – 29 August 2021	Succeeded by (China) Xu Jiayu (United States) Coleman Stewart
