= Ole Braunschweig =

German swimmer (born 1997)

Personal information
- Nationality: German
- Born: 15 November 1997 (age 28) Berlin, Germany
- Height: 1.90 m (6 ft 3 in)

Sport
- Sport: Swimming
Medal record
Men's swimming
Representing Germany
European Championships (LC)
Bronze medal – third place	2022 Rome	50 m backstroke
European Championships (SC)
Silver medal – second place	2023 Otopeni	50 m backstroke

Ole Braunschweig (German pronunciation: [ˈoːlə ˈbʁaʊnʃvaɪk]; born 15 November 1997) is a German swimmer. He competed in the men's 100 metre backstroke at the 2020 Summer Olympics.
