= Swimming at the 2020 European Aquatics Championships – Men's 100 metre freestyle =

2021 swimming competition

Men's 100 metre freestyle at the 2020 European Aquatics Championships
- Venue: Danube Arena
- Dates: 18 May 2021 (heats and semifinals); 19 May 2021 (final)
- Competitors: 98 from 40 nations
- Winning time: 47.37

Medalists
| gold medal | Kliment Kolesnikov | Russia |
| silver medal | Alessandro Miressi | Italy |
| bronze medal | Andrey Minakov | Russia |

The Men's 100 metre freestyle competition of the 2020 European Aquatics Championships was held on 18 and 19 May 2021.

== Records ==
Prior to the competition, the existing world, European and championship records were as follows.

| | Name | Nationality | Time | Location | Date |
|---|---|---|---|---|---|
| World record | César Cielo | Brazil | 46.91 | Rome | 30 July 2009 |
| European record | Alain Bernard | France | 47.12 | Rome | 30 July 2009 |
| Championship record | Alain Bernard | France | 47.50 | Eindhoven | 22 March 2008 |

The following new records were set during this competition.

| Date | Event | Name | Nationality | Time | Record |
|---|---|---|---|---|---|
| 19 May | Final | Kliment Kolesnikov | Russia | 47.37 | CR |

== Results ==
=== Heats ===
The heats were started on 18 May at 10:00.

| Rank | Heat | Lane | Name | Nationality | Time | Notes |
|---|---|---|---|---|---|---|
| 1 | 10 | 4 | Kliment Kolesnikov | Russia | 47.53 | Q |
| 2 | 10 | 3 | Alessandro Miressi | Italy | 47.81 | Q, NR |
| 3 | 8 | 4 | Andrey Minakov | Russia | 47.88 | Q |
| 4 | 10 | 1 | Andrej Barna | Serbia | 48.17 | Q |
| 5 | 7 | 5 | David Popovici | Romania | 48.30 | Q, NR |
| 6 | 9 | 4 | Vladislav Grinev | Russia | 48.36 | |
| 6 | 10 | 2 | Maxime Grousset | France | 48.36 | Q |
| 8 | 8 | 5 | Nándor Németh | Hungary | 48.38 | Q |
| 9 | 8 | 2 | Andrey Zhilkin | Russia | 48.40 | |
| 10 | 8 | 7 | Roman Mityukov | Switzerland | 48.56 | Q |
| 11 | 10 | 6 | Szebasztián Szabó | Hungary | 48.59 | Q |
| 12 | 9 | 6 | Thomas Dean | Great Britain | 48.66 | Q |
| 13 | 9 | 5 | Kristof Milak | Hungary | 48.72 | |
| 14 | 9 | 3 | Matthew Richards | Great Britain | 48.73 | Q |
| 15 | 7 | 3 | Antonio Djakovic | Switzerland | 48.74 | Q |
| 16 | 9 | 7 | Stan Pijnenburg | Netherlands | 48.76 | Q |
| 17 | 9 | 1 | Jacob Whittle | Great Britain | 48.78 | |
| 18 | 10 | 8 | Lorenzo Zazzeri | Italy | 48.80 | Q |
| 19 | 8 | 6 | Manuel Frigo | Italy | 48.90 | |
| 20 | 4 | 5 | Björn Seeliger | Sweden | 48.98 | Q |
| 21 | 8 | 3 | Sergii Shevtsov | Ukraine | 49.02 | Q |
| 22 | 7 | 2 | Charles Rihoux | France | 49.04 | |
| 23 | 9 | 8 | Kristian Golomeev | Greece | 49.05 | |
| 23 | 10 | 7 | Velimir Stjepanović | Serbia | 49.05 | |
| 25 | 9 | 2 | Jakub Kraska | Poland | 49.08 | |
| 26 | 7 | 8 | Sebastien De Meulemeester | Belgium | 49.33 | |
| 27 | 7 | 6 | Julien Berol | France | 49.35 | |
| 28 | 8 | 1 | Josha Salchow | Germany | 49.37 | |
| 29 | 10 | 0 | Simonas Bilis | Lithuania | 49.38 | |
| 29 | 7 | 0 | Heiko Gigler | Austria | 49.38 | |
| 29 | 7 | 1 | Bartosz Piszczorowicz | Poland | 49.38 | |
| 32 | 7 | 4 | Jesse Puts | Netherlands | 49.41 | |
| 33 | 4 | 4 | Artem Bondar | Ukraine | 49.42 | |
| 33 | 8 | 8 | Kacper Majchrzak | Poland | 49.42 | |
| 35 | 10 | 9 | Nyls Korstanje | Netherlands | 49.46 | |
| 35 | 6 | 3 | Thomas Thijs | Belgium | 49.46 | |
| 37 | 7 | 7 | Péter Holoda | Hungary | 49.50 | |
| 38 | 6 | 7 | Daniel Zaitsev | Estonia | 49.51 | |
| 39 | 6 | 4 | Moritz Berg | Spain | 49.56 | |
| 40 | 6 | 6 | Nils Liess | Switzerland | 49.58 | |
| 40 | 6 | 2 | Alexandre Marcourt | Belgium | 49.58 | |
| 42 | 8 | 9 | Robin Hanson | Sweden | 49.61 | |
| 43 | 5 | 7 | Isak Eliasson | Sweden | 49.66 | |
| 44 | 9 | 9 | Miguel Nascimento | Portugal | 49.68 | |
| 45 | 4 | 7 | Nikola Miljenić | Croatia | 49.69 | |
| 46 | 4 | 3 | Nikola Aćin | Serbia | 49.75 | |
| 46 | 8 | 0 | Meiron Cheruti | Israel | 49.75 | |
| 48 | 9 | 0 | Leonardo Deplano | Italy | 49.77 | |
| 49 | 7 | 9 | Valentyn Nesterki | Ukraine | 49.82 | |
| 50 | 5 | 2 | Björn Kammann | Germany | 49.83 | |
| 51 | 5 | 1 | Markus Lie | Norway | 49.85 | |
| 52 | 6 | 9 | Uroš Nikolić | Serbia | 49.93 | |
| 53 | 4 | 2 | Ari-Pekka Liukkonen | Finland | 49.99 | |
| 54 | 3 | 5 | Anton Herrala | Finland | 50.00 | |
| 55 | 2 | 5 | Alex Ahtiainen | Estonia | 50.06 | |
| 56 | 5 | 9 | Marcin Cieślak | Poland | 50.08 | |
| 56 | 5 | 3 | Yauhen Tsurkin | Belarus | 50.08 | |
| 58 | 6 | 1 | Artsiom Machekin | Belarus | 50.09 | |
| 59 | 3 | 8 | Ralph Daleiden Ciuferri | Luxembourg | 50.11 | |
| 60 | 2 | 4 | Nicholas Lia | Norway | 50.13 | |
| 61 | 5 | 5 | Mario Mollà | Spain | 50.15 | |
| 62 | 5 | 8 | Odysseus Meladinis | Greece | 50.19 | |
| 63 | 4 | 1 | Yalım Acımış | Turkey | 50.20 | |
| 64 | 3 | 2 | George Stoica-Constantin | Romania | 50.22 | |
| 65 | 5 | 6 | Niksa Stojkovski | Norway | 50.25 | |
| 66 | 5 | 4 | Tomer Frankel | Israel | 50.28 | |
| 67 | 3 | 6 | Grigori Pekarski | Finland | 50.38 | |
| 68 | 2 | 6 | Pit Brandenburger | Luxembourg | 50.41 | |
| 69 | 3 | 9 | Matej Duša | Slovakia | 50.50 | |
| 70 | 6 | 5 | Jasper Aerents | Belgium | 50.51 | |
| 71 | 4 | 0 | Daniil Pancerevas | Lithuania | 50.56 | |
| 72 | 3 | 3 | Illya Linnyk | Ukraine | 50.60 | |
| 73 | 4 | 6 | Artur Barseghyan | Armenia | 50.63 | |
| 74 | 6 | 0 | Gal Cohen Groumi | Israel | 50.76 | |
| 75 | 3 | 0 | Nikolas Antoniou | Cyprus | 50.78 | |
| 76 | 4 | 9 | Jokūbas Keblys | Lithuania | 50.79 | |
| 77 | 3 | 4 | Doğa Çelik | Turkey | 50.80 | |
| 77 | 3 | 1 | Marcus Holmquist | Sweden | 50.80 | |
| 79 | 4 | 8 | Yordan Yanchev | Bulgaria | 50.92 | |
| 80 | 3 | 7 | Tomas Navikonis | Lithuania | 51.09 | |
| 81 | 2 | 2 | Nikola Bjelajac | Bosnia and Herzegovina | 51.23 | |
| 82 | 2 | 7 | Sašo Boškan | Slovenia | 51.30 | |
| 83 | 2 | 8 | Melikşah Düğen | Turkey | 51.54 | |
| 84 | 5 | 0 | Baturalp Ünlü | Turkey | 51.63 | |
| 85 | 2 | 3 | Constantin Malachi | Moldova | 51.95 | |
| 86 | 2 | 1 | David Abesadze | Georgia | 52.03 | |
| 87 | 2 | 0 | Bernat Lomero | Andorra | 52.07 | NR |
| 88 | 1 | 4 | Tomás Lomero | Andorra | 52.58 | |
| 89 | 2 | 9 | Boško Radulović | Montenegro | 52.95 | |
| 90 | 1 | 5 | Ado Gargović | Montenegro | 53.56 | |
| 91 | 1 | 6 | Eduard Tshagharyan | Armenia | 54.26 | |
| 92 | 1 | 9 | Vladimir Mamikonyan | Armenia | 54.68 | |
| 92 | 1 | 8 | Paolo Priska | Albania | 54.68 | |
| 94 | 1 | 0 | Vigan Bytyqi | Kosovo | 54.79 | |
| 95 | 1 | 3 | Théo Chiabaut | Monaco | 54.96 | |
| 96 | 1 | 2 | Olt Kondirolli | Kosovo | 55.13 | |
| 97 | 1 | 7 | Ethan Faloppa | Monaco | 55.17 | |
| 98 | 1 | 1 | Dren Ukimeraj | Kosovo | 57.09 | |
| | 6 | 8 | Denis Loktev | Israel | Did not start | |
| | 10 | 5 | Duncan Scott | Great Britain | Did not start | |

=== Semifinals ===
The semifinals were held on 18 May at 18:24.

==== Semifinal 1 ====
| Rank | Lane | Name | Nationality | Time | Notes |
|---|---|---|---|---|---|
| 1 | 4 | Alessandro Miressi | Italy | 47.53 | Q, NR |
| 2 | 3 | Maxime Grousset | France | 48.09 | Q |
| 3 | 6 | Roman Mityukov | Switzerland | 48.28 | q |
| 4 | 2 | Thomas Dean | Great Britain | 48.39 | q |
| 5 | 5 | Andrej Barna | Serbia | 48.41 | |
| 6 | 1 | Lorenzo Zazzeri | Italy | 48.59 | |
| 7 | 7 | Antonio Djakovic | Switzerland | 48.96 | |
| 8 | 8 | Sergii Shevtsov | Ukraine | 49.33 | |

==== Semifinal 2 ====
| Rank | Lane | Name | Nationality | Time | Notes |
|---|---|---|---|---|---|
| 1 | 5 | Andrey Minakov | Russia | 47.82 | Q |
| 2 | 4 | Kliment Kolesnikov | Russia | 47.85 | Q |
| 3 | 6 | Nándor Németh | Hungary | 48.02 | q |
| 4 | 3 | David Popovici | Romania | 48.28 | q, NR |
| 5 | 2 | Szebasztián Szabó | Hungary | 48.87 | |
| 6 | 1 | Stan Pijnenburg | Netherlands | 48.89 | |
| 7 | 8 | Björn Seeliger | Sweden | 48.99 | |
| 8 | 7 | Matthew Richards | Great Britain | 49.01 | |

=== Final ===
The final was held on 19 May at 18:19.

| Rank | Lane | Name | Nationality | Time | Notes |
|---|---|---|---|---|---|
| 1st place, gold medalist(s) | 3 | Kliment Kolesnikov | Russia | 47.37 | CR |
| 2nd place, silver medalist(s) | 4 | Alessandro Miressi | Italy | 47.45 | NR |
| 3rd place, bronze medalist(s) | 5 | Andrey Minakov | Russia | 47.74 | |
| 4 | 6 | Nándor Németh | Hungary | 47.84 | NR |
| 5 | 2 | Maxime Grousset | France | 47.90 | |
| 6 | 1 | David Popovici | Romania | 48.08 | NR |
| 7 | 8 | Thomas Dean | Great Britain | 48.30 | |
| 8 | 7 | Roman Mityukov | Switzerland | 48.47 | |
