= Swimming at the 2020 European Aquatics Championships – Men's 4 × 100 metre freestyle relay =

Men's 4 × 100 metre freestyle relay at the 2020 European Aquatics Championships
- Venue: Danube Arena
- Dates: 17 May 2021
- Competitors: 93 from 21 nations
- Teams: 21
- Winning time: 3:10.41

Medalists
| gold medal | Andrey Minakov; Aleksandr Shchegolev; Vladislav Grinev; Kliment Kolesnikov; Andrey Zhilkin; Mikhail Vekovishchev; Ivan Girev; Evgeny Rylov | Russia |
| silver medal | Thomas Dean; Matthew Richards; James Guy; Duncan Scott; Jacob Whittle; Joe Litchfield | Great Britain |
| bronze medal | Alessandro Miressi; Lorenzo Zazzeri; Thomas Ceccon; Manuel Frigo; Leonardo Deplano | Italy |

The Men's 4 × 100 metre freestyle relay competition of the 2020 European Aquatics Championships was held on 17 May 2021.

== Records ==
Before the competition, the existing world, European and championship records were as follows.

| | Team | Time | Location | Date |
|---|---|---|---|---|
| World record | United States | 3:08.24 | Beijing | 11 August 2008 |
| European record | France | 3:08.32 | Beijing | 11 August 2008 |
| Championship record | France | 3:11.64 | Berlin | 18 August 2014 |

The following new records were set during this competition.

| Date | Event | Nation | Time | Record |
|---|---|---|---|---|
| 17 May | Final | Russia | 3:10.41 | CR |

== Results ==
=== Heats ===
The heats were held at 11:48.

| Rank | Heat | Lane | Nation | Swimmers | Time | Notes |
|---|---|---|---|---|---|---|
| 1 | 2 | 6 | Italy | Alessandro Miressi (47.95); Manuel Frigo (48.05); Leonardo Deplano (48.87); Lorenzo Zazzeri (47.98) | 3:12.85 | Q |
| 2 | 2 | 7 | Serbia | Velimir Stjepanović (49.25); Uroš Nikolić (48.68); Andrej Barna (47.74); Nikola Aćin (48.24) | 3:13.91 | Q, NR |
| 3 | 2 | 2 | Great Britain | Matthew Richards (49.12); James Guy (48.15); Jacob Whittle (48.43); Joe Litchfield (48.59) | 3:14.29 | Q |
| 4 | 2 | 4 | Russia | Andrey Zhilkin (48.93); Mikhail Vekovishchev (48.42); Ivan Girev (48.54); Evgeny Rylov (48.61) | 3:14.50 | Q |
| 5 | 3 | 6 | Switzerland | Roman Mityukov (48.21); Nils Liess (49.02); Noè Ponti (48.70); Antonio Djakovic (48.79) | 3:14.72 | Q, NR |
| 6 | 3 | 5 | Netherlands | Nyls Korstanje (48.88); Stan Pijnenburg (48.01); Thom de Boer (49.00); Jesse Puts (48.91) | 3:14.80 | Q |
| 7 | 2 | 0 | Greece | Apostolos Christou (48.65 NR); Kristian Golomeev (48.46); Odysseus Meladinis (49.56); Andreas Vazaios (48.49) | 3:15.16 | Q |
| 8 | 3 | 8 | Hungary | Dominik Kozma (49.49); Péter Holoda (48.90); Szebasztián Szabó (48.84); Richárd Bohus (48.38) | 3:15.61 | Q |
| 9 | 1 | 5 | Sweden | Robin Hanson (48.93); Björn Seeliger (48.37); Isak Eliasson (48.57); Elias Persson (49.96) | 3:15.83 | |
| 10 | 2 | 3 | Poland | Konrad Czerniak (49.30); Bartosz Piszczorowicz (48.88); Kacper Stokowski (49.16); Kacper Majchrzak (48.78) | 3:16.12 | |
| 11 | 3 | 3 | Belgium | Alexandre Marcourt (49.58); Jasper Aerents (49.03); Thomas Thijs (49.04); Sebastien De Meulemeester (48.97) | 3:16.62 | |
| 12 | 3 | 1 | Ireland | Jack McMillan (49.12); Jordan Sloan (49.20); Shane Ryan (49.02); Max McCusker (49.54) | 3:16.88 | NR |
| 13 | 3 | 7 | Israel | Tomer Frankel (49.85); Meiron Cheruti (49.18); Denis Loktev (49.56); Gal Cohen Groumi (49.23) | 3:17.82 | NR |
| 14 | 3 | 2 | Ukraine | Valentyn Nesterkin (49.79); Sergii Shevtsov (48.18); Illya Linnyk (50.04); Artem Bondar (50.03) | 3:18.04 | |
| 15 | 1 | 3 | Turkey | Yalım Acımış (50.07); Ümitcan Güreş (50.10); Baturalp Ünlü (49.33); Doğa Çelik (49.91) | 3:19.41 | |
| 16 | 3 | 4 | Lithuania | Deividas Margevičius (50.35); Simonas Bilis (48.71); Daniil Pancerevas (50.52); Jokūbas Keblys (50.13) | 3:19.71 | |
| 17 | 2 | 1 | Norway | Markus Lie (50.06); Niksa Stojkovski (49.65); Nicholas Lia (49.01); Jon Jøntvedt (51.68) | 3:20.40 | NR |
| 18 | 1 | 4 | Luxembourg | Max Mannes (50.98); Raphaël Stacchiotti (51.43); Pit Brandenburger (50.07); Ralph Daleiden (49.14) | 3:21.62 | NR |
| 19 | 2 | 5 | Slovakia | Ádám Halás (51.76); Matej Duša (49.64); Jakub Poliačik (52.17); Alex Kušík (52.42) | 3:25.99 | NR |
| 20 | 3 | 0 | Portugal | Miguel Nascimento (49.66); Diogo Carvalho (51.62); Alexis Santos (53.87); Francisco Santos (53.37) | 3:28.52 | |
| 21 | 2 | 8 | Kosovo | Olt Kondirolli (55.84); Vigan Bytyqi (55.26); Dren Ukimeraj (57.74); Arti Krasniqi (52.92) | 3:41.76 | |

=== Final ===
The final was held at 19:09.

| Rank | Lane | Nation | Swimmers | Time | Notes |
|---|---|---|---|---|---|
| 1st place, gold medalist(s) | 6 | Russia | Andrey Minakov (48.18); Aleksandr Shchegolev (47.64); Vladislav Grinev (47.49); Kliment Kolesnikov (47.10) | 3:10.41 | CR |
| 2nd place, silver medalist(s) | 3 | Great Britain | Thomas Dean (48.32); Matthew Richards (48.13); James Guy (47.92); Duncan Scott (47.19) | 3:11.56 | NR |
| 3rd place, bronze medalist(s) | 4 | Italy | Alessandro Miressi (47.74 NR); Lorenzo Zazzeri (48.30); Thomas Ceccon (47.98); Manuel Frigo (47.85) | 3:11.87 | |
| 4 | 8 | Hungary | Nándor Németh (48.41); Szebasztián Szabó (48.25); Richárd Bohus (48.34); Kristóf Milák (47.50) | 3:12.50 | |
| 5 | 1 | Greece | Apostolos Christou (48.39 NR); Kristian Golomeev (47.77); Odysseus Meladinis (49.09); Andreas Vazaios (48.14) | 3:13.39 | NR |
| 6 | 2 | Switzerland | Roman Mityukov (48.20); Nils Liess (48.53); Noè Ponti (48.57); Antonio Djakovic (48.11) | 3:13.41 | NR |
| 7 | 5 | Serbia | Velimir Stjepanović (48.72); Uroš Nikolić (49.14); Andrej Barna (47.15); Nikola Aćin (48.72) | 3:13.73 | NR |
| 8 | 7 | Netherlands | Nyls Korstanje (48.86); Stan Pijnenburg (47.79); Thom de Boer (49.03); Jesse Puts (48.11) | 3:13.79 | NR |
