= Swimming at the 2018 Summer Youth Olympics – Mixed 4 × 100 metre medley relay =

Mixed 4 × 100 metre medley relay at the 2018 Summer Youth Olympics
- Venue: Natatorium
- Dates: 12 October
- Competitors: 114 from 27 nations
- Winning time: 3:49.79

Medalists
gold medal	Wang Guanbin; Sun Jiajun; Lin Xintong; Yang Junxuan; Peng Xuwei; Hong Jinquan	China
silver medal	Polina Egorova; Anastasia Makarova; Andrei Minakov; Kliment Kolesnikov; Vladislav Gerasimenko; Daniil Markov; Elizaveta Klevanovich	Russia
bronze medal	Miku Kojima; Taku Taniguchi; Shinnosuke Ishikawa; Nagisa Ikemoto; Yu Hanaguruma	Japan

The mixed 4 × 100 metre medley relay event at the 2018 Summer Youth Olympics took place on 12 October at the Natatorium in Buenos Aires, Argentina.

== Results ==
=== Heats ===
The heats were started at 11:18

Rank	Heat	Lane	Name	Nationality	Time	Notes
1	4	8	Peng Xuwei (1:01.64); Sun Jiajun (1:01.60); Hong Jinquan (54.25); Yang Junxuan (55.61)	China	3:53.10	Q
2	2	3	Miku Kojima (1:03.96); Yu Hanaguruma (1:01.80); Shinnosuke Ishikawa (52.96); Nagisa Ikemoto (55.42)	Japan	3:54.14	Q
3	4	4	Polina Egorova (1:02.33); Vladislav Gerasimenko (1:01.91); Daniil Markov (54.89); Elizaveta Klevanovich (55.29)	Russia	3:54.42	Q
4	3	4	Madison Broad (1:02.17); Alexander Milanovich (1:03.12); Joshua Liendo (54.55); Kyla Leibel (55.53)	Canada	3:55.37	Q
5	2	1	Ingeborg Vassbakk Løyning (1:02.83); André Klippenberg Grindheim (1:04.56); Tomoe Zenimoto Hvas (52.34); Malene Rypestøl (57.60)	Norway	3:57.33	Q
6	4	5	Rhyan White (1:02.17); Ethan Dang (1:04.62); Jake Johnson (54.30); Kate Douglass (56.37)	United States	3:57.46	Q
7	3	1	Lila Touili (1:03.35); Clara Basso-Bert (1:09.95); Sergueï Comte (54.02); Jean-Marc Delices (50.48)	France	3:57.80	Q
8	3	8	Julia Mrozinski (1:03.64); Anna Kroniger (1:11.71); Luca Armbruster (53.15); Rafael Miroslaw (49.57)	Germany	3:58.07	Q
9	2	8	Kaylee McKeown (1:01.34); Chelsea Hodges (1:10.37); Joseph Jackson (56.63); Ashton Brinkworth (50.07)	Australia	3:58.41	
10	4	7	Aleksandra Knop (1:03.83); Jan Kałusowski (1:03.70); Jakub Majerski (53.94); Kornelia Fiedkiewicz (57.29)	Poland	3:58.76	
11	2	7	Björn Seeliger (57.57); Hannah Brunzell (1:11.14); Sara Junevik (1:00.40); Robin Hanson (50.01)	Sweden	3:59.12	
12	4	2	Fernanda de Goeij (1:02.79); Vitor de Souza (1:04.95); Maria Pessanha (1:01.55); Lucas Peixoto (50.16)	Brazil	3:59.45	
13	1	3	Anastasia Gorbenko (1:01.69); Gal Cohen Groumi (1:05.78); Lea Polonsky (1:01.85); Denis Loktev (50.36)	Israel	3:59.68	
14	2	4	Hendrik Duvenhage (57.58); Michael Houlie (1:01.74); Duné Coetzee (1:03.42); Christin Mundell (58.59)	South Africa	4:01.33	
15	2	5	Natalie Kan (1:04.96); Marcus Mok (1:04.31); Nicholas Lim (55.61); Tinky Ho (57.63)	Hong Kong	4:02.51	
16	1	6	Noè Ponti (58.16); Elena Onieva Henrich (1:13.75); Antonio Djakovic (54.39); Leoni Richter (57.07)	Switzerland	4:03.37	
17	1	5	Guillermo Cruz (58.50); Andrés Puente (1:03.72); Miriam Guevara (1:02.08); Taydé Sansores (59.66)	Mexico	4:03.96	
18	3	7	Alanas Tautkus (57.04); Kotryna Teterevkova (1:09.26); Agnė Šeleikaitė (1:05.77); Arijus Pavlidi (51.95)	Lithuania	4:04.02	
19	3	5	Juan Méndez (58.27); María Alborzen (1:11.99); Joaquín González (57.72); Julieta Lema (56.41)	Argentina	4:04.39	
20	3	2	Tatiana Salcuțan (1:02.60); Anastasia Moscenscaia (1:11.36); Nichita Bortnicov (57.80); Ivan Semidetnov (52.98)	Moldova	4:04.74	
21	3	3	Gan Ching Hwee (1:08.15); Maximillian Ang (1:04.72); Ong Jung Yi (55.10); Christie Chue (57.70)	Singapore	4:05.67	
22	3	6	Roni Kallström (58.10); Laura Lahtinen (1:13.74); Nea-Amanda Heinola (1:02.75); Alexey Belfer (53.25)	Finland	4:07.84	
23	2	2	Lucija Šulenta (1:06.30); Nika Čulina (1:13.81); Dominik Karačić (56.66); Ognjen Marić (52.94)	Croatia	4:09.71	
24	4	1	Anastassiya Rezvantseva (1:05.41); Diana Nazarova (1:20.34); Kirill Shatskov (56.39); Alen Okhotinskiy (53.46)	Kazakhstan	4:15.60	
25	1	4	Anthony Rincón (57.14); María Román (1:24.79); Valentina Becerra (1:02.54); Juan Morales (53.57)	Colombia	4:18.04	
26	2	6	Akhmadjon Umurov (1:02.12); Aleksey Sidorchuk (1:05.80); Bibigul Menlibaeva (1:10.40); Natalya Kritinina (1:00.67)	Uzbekistan	4:18.99	
27	4	3	Trinidad Ardiles (1:05.38); Inés Marín (1:23.60); Benjamin Schnapp (57.98); Martín Valdivieso (55.00)	Chile	4:21.96	

=== Final ===
The final was held at 19:42.

Rank	Lane	Name	Nationality	Time	Notes
1st place, gold medalist(s)	4	Wang Guanbin (55.31); Sun Jiajun (1:00.22); Lin Xintong (59.52); Yang Junxuan (54.74)	China	3:49.79	
2nd place, silver medalist(s)	3	Polina Egorova (1:01.98); Anastasia Makarova (1:10.00); Andrei Minakov (51.63); Kliment Kolesnikov (47.85)	Russia	3:51.46	
3rd place, bronze medalist(s)	5	Miku Kojima (1:03.74); Taku Taniguchi (1:01.16); Shinnosuke Ishikawa (51.94); Nagisa Ikemoto (54.90)	Japan	3:51.74	
4	2	Ingeborg Vassbakk Løyning (1:02.95); André Klippenberg Grindheim (1:03.21); Tomoe Zenimoto Hvas (53.03); Malene Rypestøl (57.56)	Norway	3:56.75	
5	7	Rhyan White (1:02.18); Ethan Dang (1:04.34); Jake Johnson (54.40); Kate Douglass (55.89)	United States	3:56.81	
6	1	Lila Touili (1:03.56); Clara Basso-Bert (1:09.49); Sergueï Comte (53.88); Jean-Marc Delices (50.32)	France	3:57.25	
7	6	Madison Broad (1:02.68); Alexander Milanovich (1:04.86); Joshua Liendo (53.75); Kyla Leibel (56.03)	Canada	3:57.32	
8	8	Julia Mrozinski (1:03.08); Anna Kroniger (1:12.17); Luca Armbruster (53.24); Rafael Miroslaw (49.39)	Germany	3:57.88	
