= Swimming at the 2018 European Aquatics Championships – Mixed 4 × 100 metre freestyle relay =

Mixed 4 × 100 metre freestyle relay at the 2018 European Aquatics Championships
- Venue: Tollcross International Swimming Centre
- Dates: 8 August
- Competitors: 76 from 15 nations
- Teams: 15
- Winning time: 3:22.07

Medalists
gold medal	Jérémy Stravius; Mehdy Metella; Marie Wattel; Charlotte Bonnet; Maxime Grousset; Margaux Fabre; Béryl Gastaldello	France
silver medal	Nyls Korstanje; Stan Pijnenburg; Femke Heemskerk; Ranomi Kromowidjojo; Kyle Stolk; Stan Pijnenburg; Kira Toussaint	Netherlands
bronze medal	Kliment Kolesnikov; Vladislav Grinev; Maria Kameneva; Arina Openysheva; Danila Izotov; Rozaliya Nasretdinova	Russia

The Mixed 4 × 100 metre freestyle relay competition of the 2018 European Aquatics Championships was held on 8 August 2018.

== Records ==
Prior to the competition, the existing world and championship records were as follows.

	Team	Time	Location	Date
World record	United States	3:19.60	Budapest	29 July 2017
European record	Netherlands	3:21.81	Budapest	29 July 2017
Championship record	Netherlands	3:23.64	London	20 May 2016

The following new records were set during this competition.

Date	Event	Nation	Time	Record
8 August	Final	France	3:22.07	CR

== Results ==
=== Heats ===
The heats were started at 10:01.

Rank	Heat	Lane	Nation	Swimmers	Time	Notes
1	2	4	Russia	Danila Izotov (48.90); Vladislav Grinev (48.10); Rozaliya Nasretdinova (55.21); Arina Openysheva (54.94)	3:27.15	Q
2	1	3	Netherlands	Kyle Stolk (49.57); Stan Pijnenburg (48.65); Kira Toussaint (54.60); Ranomi Kromowidjojo (54.37)	3:27.19	Q
3	2	1	France	Jérémy Stravius (48.94); Maxime Grousset (48.93); Margaux Fabre (54.77); Béryl Gastaldello (54.76)	3:27.40	Q
4	1	5	Italy	Lorenzo Zazzeri (50.09); Alessandro Miressi (48.24); Giada Galizi (54.70); Erika Ferraioli (54.92)	3:27.95	Q
5	1	4	Germany	Damian Wierling (49.20); Christoph Fildebrandt (49.37); Reva Foos (54.37); Marie Pietruschka (55.23)	3:28.17	Q
6	2	7	Israel	David Gamburg (50.35); Ziv Kalontarov (49.05); Anastasia Gorbenko (56.68); Andrea Murez (54.37)	3:30.45	Q
7	1	6	Hungary	Richárd Bohus (50.12); Maxim Lobanovszkij (49.01); Evelyn Verrasztó (55.06); Liliána Szilágyi (56.61)	3:30.80	Q
8	1	1	Poland	Kacper Majchrzak (49.30); Jakub Kraska (49.31); Dominika Kossakowska (56.36); Aleksandra Polańska (56.39)	3:31.36	Q
9	1	2	Sweden	Christoffer Carlsen (49.21); Isak Eliasson (49.91); Ida Lindborg (55.97); Magdalena Kuras (56.31)	3:31.40	
10	2	5	Belgium	Jasper Aerents (49.89); Emmanuel Vanluchene (49.34); Juliette Dumont (56.64); Lotte Goris (55.89)	3:31.76	
11	2	6	Austria	Alexander Trampitsch (49.73); Bernhard Reitshammer (49.19); Lena Kreundl (56.02); Cornelia Pammer (56.99)	3:31.93	
12	2	3	Norway	Markus Lie (49.95); Niksa Stojkovski (49.80); Susann Bjørnsen (57.05); Emilie Løvberg (57.78)	3:34.58	
13	2	8	Turkey	Yalım Acımış (50.99); Kemal Arda Gürdal (50.11); Selen Özbilen (56.40); Ekaterina Avramova (58.03)	3:35.53	
14	2	2	Estonia	Marko-Matteus Langel (51.85); Nikita Tsernosev (50.54); Kertu Ly Alnek (56.59); Aleksa Gold (57.29)	3:36.27	
15	1	7	Latvia	Ģirts Feldbergs (51.74); Daniils Bobrovs (52.88); Ieva Maļuka (57.17); Gabriela Ņikitina (56.99)	3:38.78	

=== Final ===
The final was started at 17:45.

Rank	Lane	Nation	Swimmers	Time	Notes
1st place, gold medalist(s)	3	France	Jérémy Stravius (48.81); Mehdy Metella (47.45); Marie Wattel (53.47); Charlotte Bonnet (52.34)	3:22.07	CR
2nd place, silver medalist(s)	5	Netherlands	Nyls Korstanje (49.40); Stan Pijnenburg (48.74); Femke Heemskerk (52.62); Ranomi Kromowidjojo (53.21)	3:23.97	
3rd place, bronze medalist(s)	4	Russia	Kliment Kolesnikov (48.45); Vladislav Grinev (47.69); Maria Kameneva (53.90); Arina Openysheva (54.46)	3:24.50	NR
4	6	Italy	Luca Dotto (49.23); Alessandro Miressi (47.38); Giada Galizi (54.69); Federica Pellegrini (53.64)	3:24.94	
5	2	Germany	Damian Wierling (49.45); Christoph Fildebrandt (49.12); Reva Foos (54.50); Annika Bruhn (53.52)	3:26.59	
6	1	Hungary	Nándor Németh (48.82); Dominik Kozma (48.27); Zsuzsanna Jakabos (56.53); Evelyn Verrasztó (55.68)	3:29.30	
7	8	Poland	Jan Świtkowski (50.24); Kacper Majchrzak (49.22); Alicja Tchórz (56.13); Katarzyna Wasick (54.03)	3:29.62	NR
8	7	Israel	David Gamburg (50.34); Ziv Kalontarov (49.34); Andrea Murez (54.87); Anastasia Gorbenko (55.18)	3:29.73	
