= 2021 FINA World Swimming Championships (25 m) – Men's 4 × 100 metre freestyle relay =

Swimming competition

Men's 4 × 100 metre freestyle relay at the 2021 FINA World Swimming Championships (25 m)
- Venue: Etihad Arena
- Location: Abu Dhabi, United Arab Emirates
- Dates: 16 December (heats and final)
- Competitors: 64 from 15 nations
- Teams: 15
- Winning time: 3:03.45

Medalists
gold medal	Kliment Kolesnikov; Andrey Minakov; Vladislav Grinev; Aleksandr Shchegolev; Vladimir Morozov; Daniil Markov
silver medal	Alessandro Miressi; Thomas Ceccon; Leonardo Deplano; Lorenzo Zazzeri; Manuel Frigo	Italy
bronze medal	Ryan Held; Hunter Tapp; Shaine Casas; Zach Apple; Tom Shields	United States

The Men's 4 × 100 metre freestyle relay competition of the 2021 FINA World Swimming Championships (25 m) was held on 16 December 2021.

== Records ==
Prior to the competition, the existing world and championship records were as follows.

World record	United States (USA)	3:03.03	Hangzhou, China	11 December 2018
Competition record	United States (USA)	3:03.03	Hangzhou, China	11 December 2018

== Results ==
=== Heats ===
The heats were started at 12:29.

Rank	Heat	Lane	Nation	Swimmers	Time	Notes
1	1	4	Russian Swimming Federation	Vladimir Morozov (47.07); Aleksandr Shchegolev (46.01); Andrey Minakov (45.94); Daniil Markov (47.00)	3:06.02	Q
2	2	4	United States	Shaine Casas (46.93); Tom Shields (47.07); Hunter Tapp (46.61); Ryan Held (46.17)	3:06.78	Q
3	2	5	Italy	Alessandro Miressi (46.76); Lorenzo Zazzeri (46.79); Leonardo Deplano (46.43); Manuel Frigo (47.02)	3:07.00	Q
4	1	6	Netherlands	Stan Pijnenburg (46.65); Thom de Boer (46.28); Nyls Korstanje (47.03); Jesse Puts (47.20)	3:07.16	Q, NR
5	1	3	Brazil	Gabriel Santos (46.91); Fernando Scheffer (47.03); Kaique Alves (47.13); Breno Correia (47.33)	3:08.40	Q
6	2	3	Great Britain	Matthew Richards (47.49); Edward Mildred (47.92); Tom Dean (47.02); Ben Proud (46.82)	3:09.25	Q, NR
7	2	2	China	Yang Jintong (48.77); Pan Zhanle (46.37); Hong Jinquan (47.39); Wang Changhao (46.88)	3:09.41	Q, NR
8	2	6	Switzerland	Roman Mityukov (48.06); Antonio Djakovic (47.18); Thomas Hallock (48.66); Robin Yeboah (48.83)	3:12.73	Q, NR
9	1	5	Ireland	Jack McMillan (47.82); Calum Bain (47.67); Brendan Hyland (48.88); Jordan Sloan (48.57)	3:12.94	
10	1	1	Hong Kong	Cheuk Ming Ho (48.76); Ian Ho (47.81); Ng Yan Kin (50.01); Ng Cheuk Yin (48.86)	3:15.44	NR
11	1	7	South Korea	Won Young-jun (48.87); Moon Seung-woo (49.77); Kim Woo-min (48.78); Lee Ho-joon (49.06)	3:16.48	NR
12	2	7	Turkey	Baturalp Ünlü (48.45); Efe Turan (49.60); Metin Aydın (49.10); Berke Saka (49.95)	3:17.10	
13	2	1	Egypt	Mohamed Samy (49.98); Marwan Elkamash (51.11); Abdelrahman Sameh (48.37); Youssef Ramadan (49.03)	3:18.49	NR
14	2	8	Kuwait	Waleed Abdulrazzaq (49.49); Ali Al-Zamil (53.09); Sauod Al-Shamroukh (52.66); Faisal Al-Tannak (53.30)	3:28.54	
15	1	8	Vietnam	Nguyễn Hữu Kim Sơn (51.87); Trần Hưng Nguyên (50.94); Hồ Nguyễn Duy Khoa (52.76); Phạm Thanh Bảo (57.90)	3:33.47	
	1	2	Singapore		DNS	

=== Final ===
The final was held at 19:56.

Rank	Lane	Nation	Swimmers	Time	Notes
1st place, gold medalist(s)	4	Russian Swimming Federation	Kliment Kolesnikov (46.44); Andrey Minakov (45.61); Vladislav Grinev (45.87); Aleksandr Shchegolev (45.53)	3:03.45	
2nd place, silver medalist(s)	3	Italy	Alessandro Miressi (46.12); Thomas Ceccon (45.71); Leonardo Deplano (45.98); Lorenzo Zazzeri (45.80)	3:03.61	NR
3rd place, bronze medalist(s)	5	United States	Ryan Held (45.75); Hunter Tapp (46.78); Shaine Casas (46.50); Zach Apple (46.39)	3:05.42	
4	6	Netherlands	Stan Pijnenburg (46.64); Thom de Boer (46.60); Nyls Korstanje (46.82); Jesse Puts (46.04)	3:06.10	NR
5	1	China	Pan Zhanle (47.43); Wang Changhao (47.32); Hong Jinquan (46.91); Yang Jintong (48.45)	3:10.11	
6	7	Great Britain	Tom Dean (47.35); Ben Proud (47.60); Edward Mildred (47.57); Matthew Richards (47.67)	3:10.19	
7	8	Switzerland	Roman Mityukov (47.67); Antonio Djakovic (47.21); Thomas Hallock (48.25); Robin Yeboah (48.40)	3:11.53	NR
	2	Brazil	Gabriel Santos (47.21); Fernando Scheffer; Kaique Alves; Breno Correia	DSQ	
