= 2018 European Junior Swimming Championships =

Water sport competitions

- Host city: Helsinki, Finland
- Dates: 4-8 July 2018

The 2018 European Junior Swimming Championships were held from 4 to 8 July 2018 in Helsinki, Finland. The Championships were organized by LEN, the European Swimming League, and were held in a 50-meter pool. The Championships were for girls aged 14–17 and boys age 15–18.

== Results ==
=== Boys ===
Games	Gold		Silver		Bronze	
50 m freestyle	Björn Seeliger; Sweden	22.27	Kliment Kolesnikov; Russia	22.61	Lewis Burras; Great Britain	22.69
100 m freestyle	Tomer Frankel; Israel	49.23	Andrei Minakov; Russia	49.24	Devid Zorzetto; Italy	49.47
200 m freestyle	Kristóf Milák; Hungary	1:47.19	Denis Loktev; Israel	1:47.95	Robin Hanson; Sweden	1:48.65
400 m freestyle	Kristóf Milák; Hungary	3:50.00	Ilia Sibirtsev; Russia	3:50.71	Johannes Calloni; Italy	3:51.14
800 m freestyle	Ákos Kalmár; Hungary	7:55.41	Paul Beaugrand; France	7:56.23	Johannes Calloni; Italy	7:56.50
1500 m freestyle	Ákos Kalmár; Hungary	15:04.91; CR	Alexander Nørgaard; Denmark	15:10.88	Johannes Calloni; Italy	15.11.47
50 m backstroke	Kliment Kolesnikov; Russia	24.52; CR	Michael Schäffner; Germany	25.23	Thierry Bollin; Switzerland	25.35
100 m backstroke	Kliment Kolesnikov; Russia Daniel Martin; Romania	53.52; CR	Not awarded		Nicholas Pyle; Great Britain	54.69
200 m backstroke	Kliment Kolesnikov; Russia	1:55.83; CR	Daniel Martin; Romania	1:58.37	Roman Mityukov; Switzerland	1:59.23
50 m breaststroke	Vladislav Gerasimenko; Russia	28.03	Didzis Rudavs; Latvia	28.19	Juri Dijkstra; Netherlands	28.21
100 m breaststroke	Vladislav Gerasimenko; Russia	1:01.36	Alessandro Fusco; Italy	1:01.90	Jan Kałusowski; Poland	1:02.10
200 m breaststroke	Aleksandr Zhigalov; Russia	2:12.47	Jan Kałusowski; Poland	2:13.45	Caspar Corbeau; Netherlands	2:14.13
50 m butterfly	Andrei Minakov; Russia	23.56	Tomoe Zenimoto Hvas; Norway	23.68	Daniil Markov; Russia	23.77
100 m butterfly	Kristóf Milák; Hungary	51.78	Andrei Minakov; Russia	52.38	Federico Burdisso; Italy	52.88
200 m butterfly	Kristóf Milák; Hungary	1:53.94	Federico Burdisso; Italy	1:56.40	Denys Kesil; Ukraine	1:56.45
200 m individual medley	Thomas Dean; Great Britain	1:59.17; CR	Maksim Stupin; Russia	2:01.42	Danil Zaytsev; Russia	2:02.42
400 m individual medley	Maksim Stupin; Russia	4:16.79	Apostolos Papastamos; Greece	4:17.44	Thomas Dean; Great Britain	4:18.07
4×100 m freestyle relay	Russia; Daniil Markov (50.12); Andrei Minakov (49.23); Aleksandr Shumilov (50.54); Kliment Kolesnikov (48.32); Arseniy Chivilev; Vadim Semenchenko	3:18.21	Italy; Federico Burdisso (50.14); Thomas Ceccon (49.52); Francesco Peron (49.87); Devid Zorzetto (49.26); Pierpaolo Veller; Giovanni Gregori	3:18.79	Germany; Peter Varjasi (49.85); Rafael Miroslaw (49.64); Maurits Kuhn (51.15); Sebastian Beck (50.48)	3:21.12
4×200 m freestyle relay	Israel; Denis Loktev (1:47.78); Gal Cohen Groumi (1:49.99); Bar Soloveychik (1:50.77); Tomer Frankel (1:47.74); Michael Smirnov	7:16.28	Russia; Kliment Kolesnikov (1:48.99); Vadim Semenchenko (1:50.93); Anton Nikitin (1:49.45); Mikhail Bocharnikov (1:48.12); Maksim Aleksandrov; Aleksandr Egorov; Aleksandr Shumilov	7:17.49	Great Britain; Harry Constantine (1:50.49); Jakob Goodman (1:49.48); Thomas Dean (1:48.49); Luke Turley (1:49.27); Archie Goodburn	7:17.73
4×100 m medley relay	Russia; Kliment Kolesnikov (53.72); Vladislav Gerasimenko (1:00.57); Andrei Minakov (51.84); Daniil Markov (49.45); Nikolai Zuev; Aleksandr Zhigalov; Egor Pavlov; Arseniy Chivilev	3:35.58	Germany; Michael Schäffner (54.83); Lucas Matzerath (1:01.74); Maurice Ingenrieth (53.45); Peter Varjasi (49.14); Rafael Miroslaw	3:39.16	Italy; Thomas Ceccon (54.40); Alessandro Fusco (1:02.01); Federico Burdisso (53.41); Devid Zorzetto (49.46); Francesco Peron	3:39.28

=== Girls ===
Games	Gold		Silver		Bronze	
50 m freestyle	Freya Anderson; Great Britain	25.35	Elizaveta Klevanovich; Russia	25.43	Kornelia Fiedkiewicz; Poland	25.53
100 m freestyle	Freya Anderson; Great Britain	54.65	Elizaveta Klevanovich; Russia	55.31	Selen Özbilen; Turkey	55.69
200 m freestyle	Isabel Marie Gose; Germany	1:58.17	Ajna Késely; Hungary	1:58.27	Polina Nevmovenko; Russia	1:59.82
400 m freestyle	Ajna Késely; Hungary	4:05.89; CR	Isabel Marie Gose; Germany	4:11.01	Marlene Kahler; Austria	4:11.62
800 m freestyle	Ajna Késely; Hungary	8:30.43; CR	Celine Rieder; Germany	8:31.54	Giulia Salin; Italy	8:34.50
1500 m freestyle	Ajna Késely; Hungary	16:21.19	Celine Rieder; Germany	16:25.05	Giulia Salin; Italy	16:28.12
50 m backstroke	Daria Vaskina; Russia	27.90; CR, EJR	Lauren Cox; Great Britain	28.51	Giulia D'Innocenzo; Italy	28.62
100 m backstroke	Daria Vaskina; Russia	59.90	Anastasia Avdeeva; Russia	1:00.39	Giulia D'Innocenzo; Italy	1:01.08
200 m backstroke	Anastasia Avdeeva; Russia	2:09.56	Laura Vanda Ilyés; Hungary	2:10.67	Tatiana Salcuțan; Moldova	2:11.37
50 m breaststroke	Tatiana Belonogoff; Great Britain	31.29	Anna Elendt; Germany	31.36	Tina Čelik; Slovenia	31.57
100 m breaststroke	Kotryna Teterevkova; Lithuania	1:08.03	Anastasia Makarova; Russia	1:08.46	Anna Elendt; Germany	1:08.68
200 m breaststroke	Anastasia Makarova; Russia	2:26.29	Alena Chekhovskikh; Russia	2:26.87	Kotryna Teterevkova; Lithuania	2:27.09
50 m butterfly	Anastasiya Shkurdai; Belarus	26.44	Maya Tobehn; Germany	26.78	Aleyna Özkan; Turkey	26.83; NR
100 m butterfly	Emily Large; Great Britain Anastasiya Shkurdai; Belarus	59.37	Not awarded		Petra Barócsai; Hungary	59.95
200 m butterfly	Blanka Berecz; Hungary	2:10.06	Ciara Schlosshan; Great Britain	2:11.18	Dóra Hatházi; Hungary	2:11.54
200 m individual medley	Anastasiia Sorokina; Russia	2:14.38	Roberta Circi; Italy	2:16.27	Ajna Késely; Hungary	2:16.39
400 m individual medley	Ajna Késely; Hungary	4:41.55	Yara Heirath; Germany	4:45.75	Lili Horváth; Hungary	4:45.88
4×100 m freestyle relay	Russia; Sofia Chichaikina (56.13); Elizaveta Klevanovich (55.16); Ekaterina Nikonova (56.01); Polina Nevmomenko (55.73); Sofya Lobova	3:43.03	Germany; Isabel Marie Gose (56.20); Lena Riedemann (56.63); Lucie Kühn (57.19); Maya Tobehn (54.80); Hannah Küchler	3:44.82	Italy; Mari Masciopinto (56.28); Giulia Borra (56.73); Carola Valle (56.57); Emma Virginia Menicucci (55.81)	3:45.39
4×200 m freestyle relay	Hungary; Fanni Fábián (2:01.15); Petra Barocsai (2:00.28); Blanka Berecz (2:03.08); Ajna Késely (1:57.73); Fanni Gyurinovics	8:02.24	Germany; Yara Hierath (2:01.32); Celine Rieder (2:02.08); Hannah Küchler (2:01.03); Isabel Marie Gose (1:57.95); Giulia Goerigk	8:02.38	Russia; Polina Nevmomenko (2:00.73); Aleksandra Bykova (2:03.29); Elizaveta Klevanovich (2:00.85); Yana Kurtseva (2:01.00); Sofia Chichaikina	8:05.87
4×100 m medley relay	Great Britain; Lily Boseley (1:01.86); Tatiana Belonogoff (1:08.34); Emily Large (58.88); Freya Anderson (53.40); Katie Robertson	4:02.48; CR	Russia; Anastasia Avdeeva (1:01.10); Anastasia Makarova (1:08.74); Anastasia Zhuravleva (1:00.41); Elizaveta Klevanovich (54.27); Alena Chekhovskikh; Sofia Chichaikina	4:04.52	Germany; Barbara Schaal (1:01.98); Anna Elendt (1:07.94); Maya Tobehn (1:01.01); Isabel Marie Gose (55.66); Lena Riedemann	4:06.59

=== Mixed events ===
Games	Gold		Silver		Bronze	
4×100 m freestyle relay	Russia; Kliment Kolesnikov (49.06); Andrei Minakov (48.94); Polina Nevmomenko (56.23); Elizaveta Klevanovich (54.51); Arseniy Chivilev; Ekaterina Nikonova; Sofia Chichaikina	3:28.74	Germany; Peter Varjasi (49.45); Rafael Miroslaw (49.16); Isabel Marie Gose (55.18); Maya Tobehn (55.18); Sebastian Beck; Lena Riedemann	3:28.97	Hungary; Kristóf Milák (49.24); Krisztofer Hímer (50.26); Fanni Gyurinovics (56.25); Ajna Késely (55.16); Gábor Zombori; Petra Barocsai	3:30.91
4×100 m medley relay	Russia; Daria Vaskina (1:00.15); Vladislav Gerasimenko (1:00.90); Andrei Minakov (52.00); Elizaveta Klevanovich (54.94); Anastasia Avdeeva; Aleksandr Zhigalov; Egor Pavlov; Sofia Chichaikina	3:47.99; CR, EJR	Great Britain; Nicholas Pyle (55.79); Archie Goodburn (1:02.37); Emily Large (59.17); Freya Anderson (54.10); Katie Robertson; Lewis Burras	3:51.43	Germany; Barbara Schaal (1:02.10); Lucas Matzerath (1:02.12); Maurice Ingenrieth (53.29); Isabel Marie Gose (54.83); Lena Riedemann	3:52.34

== Medal table ==
Rank	Nation	Gold	Silver	Bronze	Total
1	Russia	18	12	4	34
2	Hungary	12	2	5	19
3	Great Britain	6	3	4	13
4	Israel	2	1	0	3
5	Belarus	2	0	0	2
6	Germany	1	11	4	16
7	Romania	1	1	0	2
8	Lithuania	1	0	1	2
8	Sweden	1	0	1	2
10	Italy	0	4	11	15
11	Poland	0	1	2	3
12	Denmark	0	1	0	1
12	France	0	1	0	1
12	Greece	0	1	0	1
12	Latvia	0	1	0	1
12	Norway	0	1	0	1
17	Netherlands	0	0	2	2
17	Switzerland	0	0	2	2
17	Turkey	0	0	2	2
20	Austria	0	0	1	1
20	Moldova	0	0	1	1
20	Slovenia	0	0	1	1
20	Ukraine	0	0	1	1
Totals (23 entries)		44	40	42	126
