= Daniil Markov =

Daniil Markov may refer to:

- Danny Markov, Russian ice hockey player
- Daniil Markov (swimmer), Russian swimmer
