= Swimming at the 2018 Summer Youth Olympics – Boys' 100 metre freestyle =

Boys' 100 metre freestyle at the 2018 Summer Youth Olympics
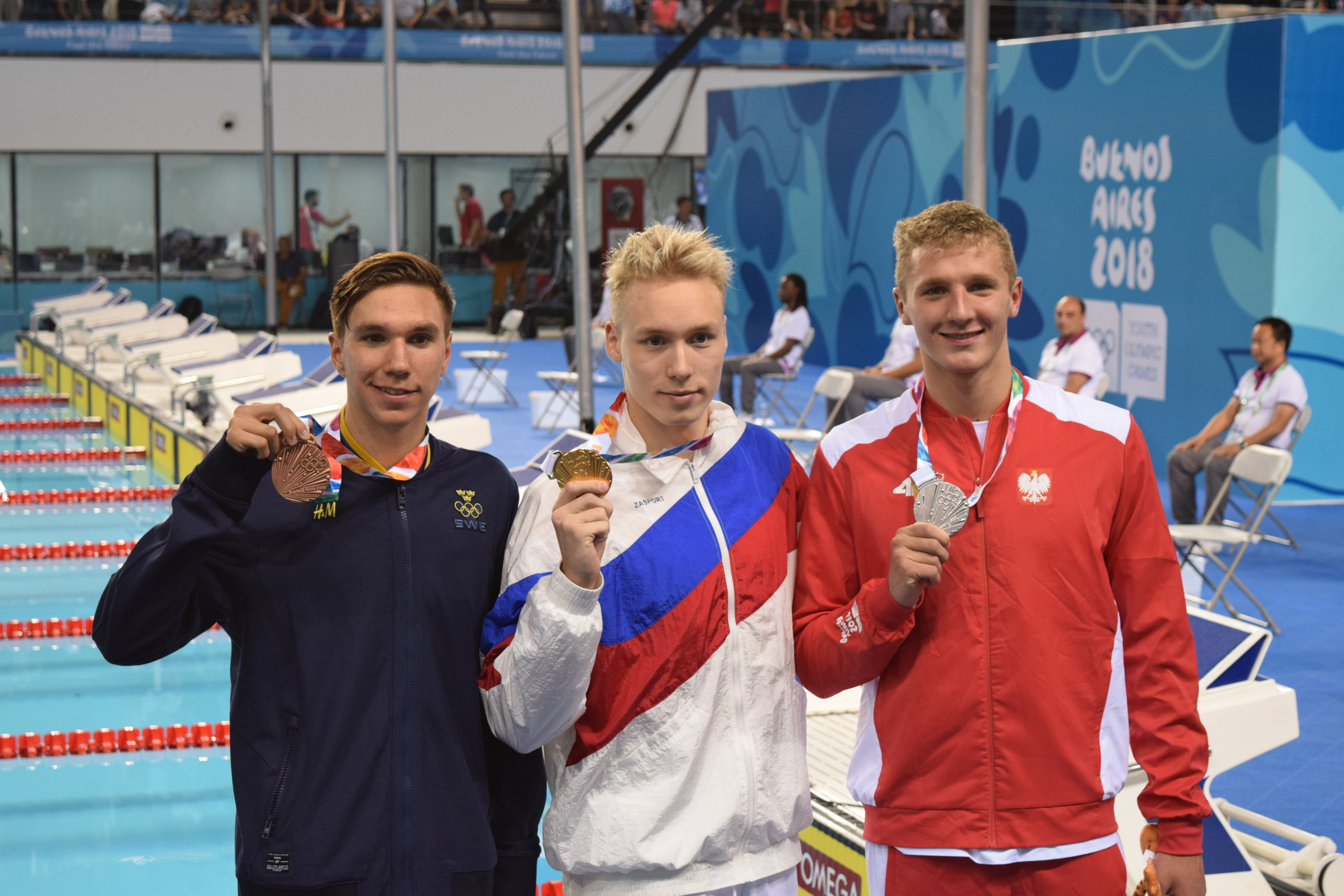
- The podium.
- Venue: Natatorium
- Dates: 11 October (heats, semifinals); 12 October (final)
- Competitors: 46 from 42 nations
- Winning time: 49.23

Medalists
gold medal	Andrei Minakov	Russia
silver medal	Jakub Kraska	Poland
bronze medal	Robin Hanson	Sweden

The boys' 100 metre freestyle event at the 2018 Summer Youth Olympics took place on 11 and 12 October at the Natatorium in Buenos Aires, Argentina.

== Results ==
=== Heats ===
The heats were started on 11 October at 10:48.

Rank	Heat	Lane	Name	Nationality	Time	Notes
1	5	6	Lee Yoo-yeon	South Korea	50.11	Q
2	6	5	Jakub Kraska	Poland	50.17	Q
3	6	4	Kristóf Milák	Hungary	50.18	Q
4	5	4	Andrei Minakov	Russia	50.20	Q
5	4	4	André Calvelo	Brazil	50.24	Q
6	6	6	Rafael Miroslaw	Germany	50.54	Q
7	5	5	Daniil Markov	Russia	50.60	Q, WD
8	6	3	Lucas Peixoto	Brazil	50.70	Q
9	3	6	Hong Jinquan	China	50.81	Q
10	6	7	Michael Pickett	New Zealand	50.89	Q
11	4	3	Denis Loktev	Israel	50.91	Q
12	5	3	Robin Hanson	Sweden	50.99	Q
13	5	7	Antonio Djakovic	Switzerland	51.04	Q
14	4	6	Ashton Brinkworth	Australia	51.05	Q
15	6	2	Robbie Powell	Ireland	51.19	Q
16	5	1	Guillermo Cruz	Mexico	51.23	Q
17	3	5	Artur Barseghyan	Armenia	51.33	Q
18	6	1	Thomas Ceccon	Italy	51.42	
19	4	8	Mohamed Aziz Ghaffari	Tunisia	51.55	
20	5	8	Mohammed Bedour	Jordan	51.56	
21	3	4	Joshua Liendo	Canada	51.60	
22	5	5	Jean-Marc Delices	France	51.62	
23	2	4	Dušan Babić	Serbia	51.71	
24	4	2	Joseph Jackson	Australia	51.87	
25	3	8	Efe Turan	Turkey	51.94	
26	4	5	Björn Seeliger	Sweden	51.99	
26	4	7	Gabriel Nortjie	South Africa	51.99	
28	2	3	Alireza Yavari	Iran	52.08	
29	3	2	Kai Legband	Bermuda	52.21	
30	6	8	Jack Kirby	Barbados	52.29	
31	3	1	Kirill Shatskov	Kazakhstan	52.43	
32	4	1	George Rațiu	Romania	52.61	
33	3	3	Akhmadjon Umurov	Uzbekistan	52.80	
34	3	7	Mateo Matheos	Paraguay	52.94	
35	2	7	Jordan Crooks	Cayman Islands	53.52	
36	2	5	Bob Sauber	Luxembourg	53.59	
37	2	6	Delron Felix	Grenada	53.64	
38	2	2	Jayhan Odlum-Smith	Saint Lucia	54.99	
39	2	1	Raffaele Tamagnini	San Marino	55.55	
40	2	8	Noel Keane	Palau	55.59	
41	1	4	Ky Odlum	Virgin Islands	56.23	
42	1	5	Nur Haziq Samil	Brunei	58.38	
43	1	3	Denis Mhini	Tanzania	58.53	
44	1	6	Shihab Fayez	Oman	1:00.68	
45	1	7	Mubal Azzam Ibrahim	Maldives	1:02.71	
46	1	2	Daniel Ranis	Marshall Islands	1:09.42	

=== Semifinals ===
The semifinals were started on 11 October at 18:22.

Rank	Heat	Lane	Name	Nationality	Time	Notes
1	1	4	Jakub Kraska	Poland	49.70	Q
2	2	3	André Calvelo	Brazil	49.87	Q
3	2	4	Lee Yoo-yeon	South Korea	50.07	Q
4	1	5	Andrei Minakov	Russia	50.16	Q
5	2	7	Robin Hanson	Sweden	50.17	Q
6	1	3	Rafael Miroslaw	Germany	50.28	Q
7	2	5	Kristóf Milák	Hungary	50.36	Q, WD
8	2	6	Lucas Peixoto	Brazil	50.53	Q
9	1	6	Hong Jinquan	China	50.71	Q
10	1	7	Antonio Djakovic	Switzerland	50.73	
11	1	1	Robbie Powell	Ireland	50.76	
12	2	1	Ashton Brinkworth	Australia	50.77	
13	1	2	Denis Loktev	Israel	50.81	
14	2	8	Guillermo Cruz	Mexico	50.84	
15	2	2	Michael Pickett	New Zealand	50.86	
16	1	8	Artur Barseghyan	Armenia	51.14	

=== Final ===
The final was held on 12 October at 18:24.

Rank	Lane	Name	Nationality	Time	Notes
1st place, gold medalist(s)	6	Andrei Minakov	Russia	49.23	
2nd place, silver medalist(s)	4	Jakub Kraska	Poland	49.26	
3rd place, bronze medalist(s)	2	Robin Hanson	Sweden	49.52	
4	5	André Calvelo	Brazil	49.86	
5	3	Lee Yoo-yeon	South Korea	50.10	
6	7	Rafael Miroslaw	Germany	50.13	
7	8	Hong Jinquan	China	50.35	
8	1	Lucas Peixoto	Brazil	50.43	
