= Swimming at the 2018 Summer Youth Olympics – Boys' 50 metre freestyle =

Boys' 50 metre freestyle at the 2018 Summer Youth Olympics
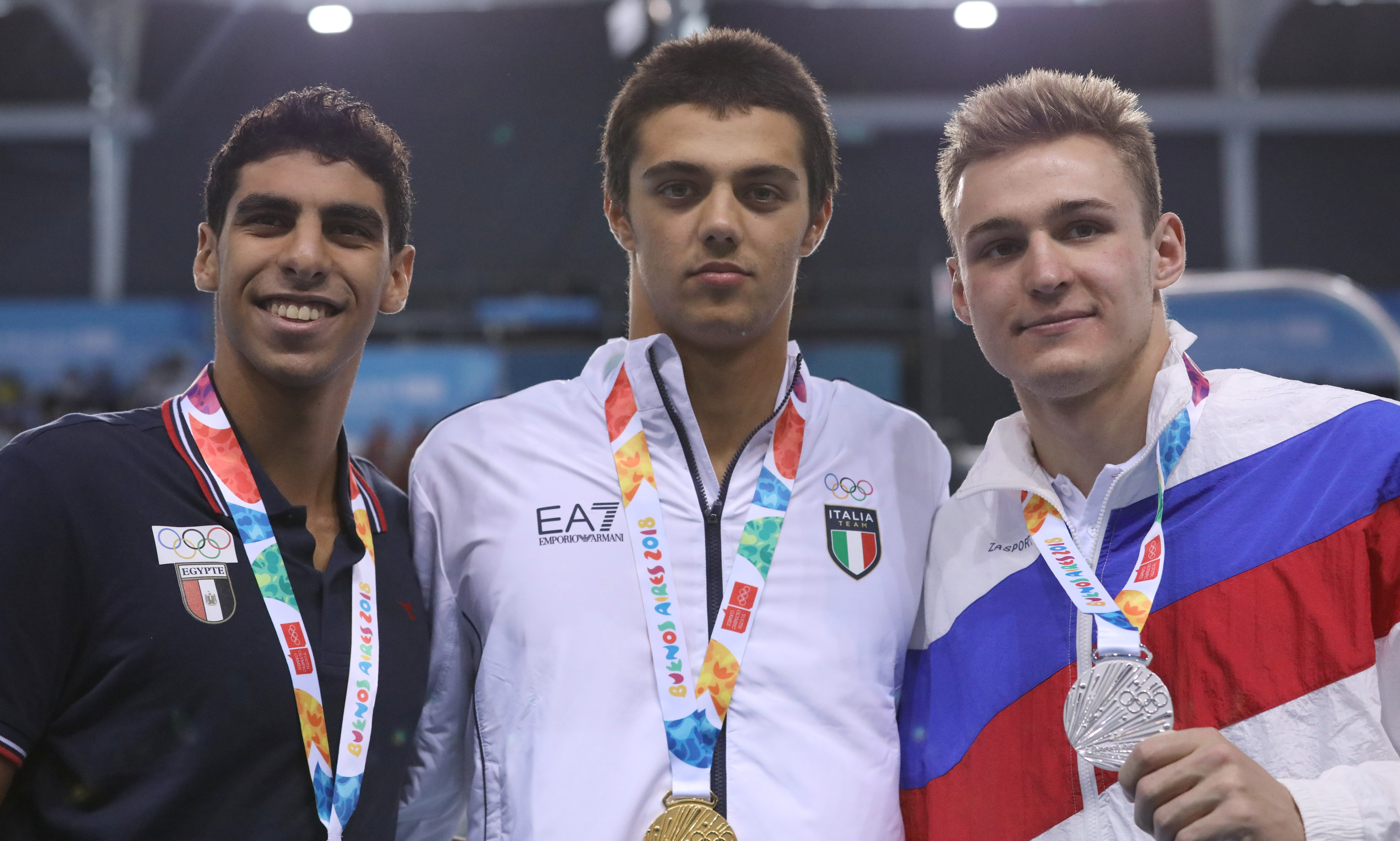
- The podium.
- Venue: Natatorium
- Dates: 9 October (heats, semifinals); 10 October (final)
- Competitors: 54 from 49 nations
- Winning time: 22.33

Medalists
| gold medal | Thomas Ceccon | Italy |
| silver medal | Daniil Markov | Russia |
| bronze medal | Abdelrahman Sameh | Egypt |

The boys' 50 metre freestyle event at the 2018 Summer Youth Olympics took place on 9 and 10 October at the Natatorium in Buenos Aires, Argentina.

== Results ==
=== Heats ===
The heats were started on 9 October at 10:58.

| Rank | Heat | Lane | Name | Nationality | Time | Notes |
|---|---|---|---|---|---|---|
| 1 | 5 | 4 | Abdelrahman Sameh | Egypt | 22.60 | Q |
| 2 | 7 | 6 | Daniil Markov | Russia | 22.73 | Q |
| 3 | 7 | 4 | Björn Seeliger | Sweden | 22.84 | Q |
| 4 | 7 | 3 | Robin Hanson | Sweden | 22.85 | Q |
| 5 | 5 | 5 | Thomas Ceccon | Italy | 22.93 | Q |
| 5 | 6 | 4 | André de Souza | Brazil | 22.93 | Q |
| 7 | 5 | 6 | Michael Pickett | New Zealand | 23.02 | Q |
| 7 | 7 | 2 | Gabriel Nortjie | South Africa | 23.02 | Q |
| 9 | 4 | 3 | Lee Yoo-yeon | South Korea | 23.05 | Q |
| 9 | 6 | 2 | George-Adrian Ratiu | Romania | 23.05 | Q |
| 11 | 6 | 2 | Kenzo Simons | Netherlands | 23.07 | Q |
| 12 | 7 | 5 | Ashton Brinkworth | Australia | 23.11 | Q |
| 13 | 6 | 3 | Federico Burdisso | Italy | 23.15 | Q, WD |
| 14 | 6 | 8 | Artur Barseghyan | Armenia | 23.17 | Q,NR |
| 15 | 5 | 3 | Lucas Peixoto | Brazil | 23.24 | Q |
| 16 | 6 | 1 | Joshua Liendo | Canada | 23.28 | Q |
| 16 | 6 | 6 | Guillermo Cruz | Mexico | 23.28 | Q |
| 18 | 7 | 1 | Matej Duša | Slovakia | 23.30 | |
| 19 | 5 | 1 | Jean-Marc Delices | France | 23.41 | |
| 20 | 4 | 4 | Mohammed Bedour | Jordan | 23.62 | |
| 21 | 4 | 5 | Alexey Belfer | Finland | 23.67 | |
| 22 | 5 | 7 | Rafael Miroslaw | Germany | 23.77 | |
| 22 | 6 | 7 | Robbie Powell | Ireland | 23.77 | |
| 24 | 5 | 2 | Joseph Jackson | Australia | 23.81 | |
| 25 | 4 | 1 | Jordan Crooks | Cayman Islands | 23.88 | |
| 26 | 7 | 8 | Kai Legband | Bermuda | 23.96 | |
| 27 | 3 | 6 | Gal Cohen Groumi | Israel | 23.97 | |
| 28 | 4 | 6 | Alen Okhotinskiy | Kazakhstan | 24.08 | |
| 29 | 7 | 7 | Izaak Bastian | Bahamas | 24.13 | |
| 30 | 5 | 8 | Jack Kirby | Barbados | 24.14 | |
| 31 | 4 | 2 | Andrés Bustamante | Mexico | 24.18 | |
| 32 | 4 | 7 | Akhmadjon Umurov | Uzbekistan | 24.29 | |
| 33 | 3 | 2 | Rudi Spiteri | Malta | 24.35 | |
| 33 | 3 | 4 | Martín Valdivieso | Chile | 24.35 | |
| 35 | 4 | 8 | Ivan Semidetnov | Moldova | 24.39 | |
| 36 | 3 | 5 | Ethan Dang | United States | 24.55 | |
| 37 | 3 | 3 | Delron Felix | Grenada | 24.77 | |
| 38 | 3 | 7 | Raffaele Tamagnini | San Marino | 24.87 | |
| 39 | 3 | 1 | Finau 'Ohuafi | Tonga | 25.54 | |
| 40 | 1 | 7 | Andrew Qumsieh | Palestine | 26.58 | |
| 41 | 3 | 8 | Ismat Moani | Sudan | 27.07 | |
| 42 | 2 | 3 | Murray MacPherson | Malawi | 27.50 | |
| 43 | 1 | 2 | Mubal Azzam Ibrahim | Maldives | 27.51 | |
| 44 | 2 | 5 | Shihab Fayez | Oman | 27.55 | |
| 45 | 1 | 6 | Sauod Al-Shamroukh | Kuwait | 27.57 | |
| 46 | 2 | 4 | Bunna Poeuvpichra | Cambodia | 28.11 | |
| 47 | 2 | 6 | Joshua Wyse | Sierra Leone | 28.57 | |
| 48 | 2 | 2 | Daniel Ranis | Marshall Islands | 29.21 | |
| 49 | 2 | 7 | Momodou Saine | The Gambia | 30.97 | |
| 50 | 2 | 1 | Tarann Ambonguilat | Gabon | 31.53 | |
| 51 | 1 | 4 | Omar Barry | Burkina Faso | 32.44 | |
| 52 | 1 | 3 | Andrés Akue | Equatorial Guinea | 32.61 | |
| 53 | 2 | 8 | Amadou Barry | Guinea | 32.90 | |
| 54 | 1 | 5 | Eddie Boyengue | Republic of the Congo | 37.28 | |

=== Semifinals ===
The semifinals were started on 9 October at 18:23.

| Rank | Heat | Lane | Name | Nationality | Time | Notes |
|---|---|---|---|---|---|---|
| 1 | 1 | 4 | Daniil Markov | Russia | 22.30 | Q |
| 2 | 2 | 4 | Abdelrahman Sameh | Egypt | 22.48 | Q |
| 3 | 2 | 3 | Thomas Ceccon | Italy | 22.57 | Q |
| 4 | 2 | 1 | Artur Barseghyan | Armenia | 22.69 | Q |
| 5 | 1 | 3 | André de Souza | Brazil | 22.71 | Q |
| 5 | 2 | 5 | Björn Seeliger | Sweden | 22.71 | Q |
| 7 | 1 | 2 | George-Adrian Ratiu | Romania | 22.85 | Q |
| 8 | 1 | 5 | Robin Hanson | Sweden | 22.93 | QSO |
| 8 | 2 | 2 | Lee Yoo-yeon | South Korea | 22.93 | QSO |
| 10 | 2 | 6 | Michael Pickett | New Zealand | 22.98 | |
| 11 | 1 | 1 | Lucas Peixoto | Brazil | 23.02 | |
| 12 | 1 | 7 | Ashton Brinkworth | Australia | 23.12 | |
| 13 | 2 | 7 | Kenzo Simons | Netherlands | 23.18 | |
| 14 | 1 | 6 | Gabriel Nortjie | South Africa | 23.22 | |
| 15 | 1 | 8 | Guillermo Cruz | Mexico | 23.30 | |
| 16 | 2 | 8 | Joshua Liendo | Canada | 23.38 | |

=== Swim-off ===
The swim-off was held on 9 October at 19:53.

| Rank | Lane | Name | Nationality | Time | Notes |
|---|---|---|---|---|---|
| 1 | 4 | Robin Hanson | Sweden | 22.76 | Q |
| 2 | 5 | Lee Yoo-yeon | South Korea | 22.87 | |

=== Final ===
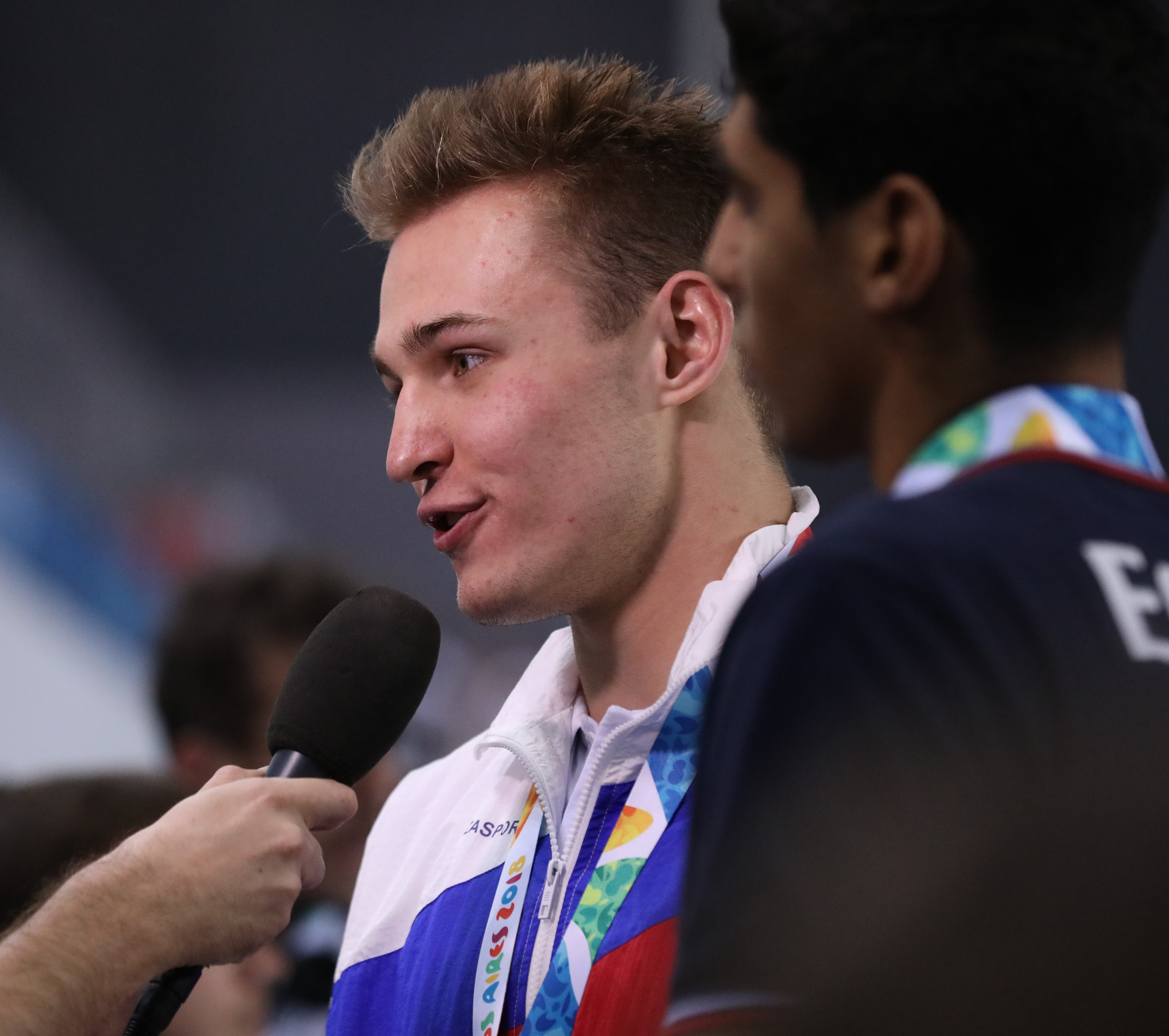
Daniil Markov, Silver medailist

The final was held on 10 October at 18:00.

| Rank | Lane | Name | Nationality | Time | Notes |
|---|---|---|---|---|---|
| 1st place, gold medalist(s) | 3 | Thomas Ceccon | Italy | 22.33 | |
| 2nd place, silver medalist(s) | 4 | Daniil Markov | Russia | 22.37 | |
| 3rd place, bronze medalist(s) | 5 | Abdelrahman Sameh | Egypt | 22.43 | |
| 4 | 2 | André de Souza | Brazil | 22.57 | |
| 5 | 7 | Björn Seeliger | Sweden | 22.77 | |
| 6 | 1 | George-Adrian Ratiu | Romania | 22.79 | |
| 7 | 8 | Robin Hanson | Sweden | 22.96 | |
| 8 | 6 | Artur Barseghyan | Armenia | 23.13 | |
