= Vladislav Gerasimenko =

Russian swimmer (born 2001)

Personal information
- National team: Russia
- Born: 26 April 2001 (age 25) Russia

Sport
- Sport: Swimming
- Strokes: Breaststroke, freestyle
Medal record
Men's swimming
Representing Russia
Event	1st	2nd	3rd
World Junior Championships	4	0	1
European Junior Championships	6	0	1
Summer Youth Olympics	3	1	0
Total	13	1	2
World Junior Championships
Gold medal – first place	2017 Indianapolis	4×100 m medley
Gold medal – first place	2019 Budapest	50 m breaststroke
Gold medal – first place	2019 Budapest	100 m breaststroke
Gold medal – first place	2019 Budapest	4×100 m medley
Bronze medal – third place	2017 Indianapolis	4×100 m mixed medley
European Junior Championships
Gold medal – first place	2018 Helsinki	50 m breaststroke
Gold medal – first place	2018 Helsinki	100 m breaststroke
Gold medal – first place	2018 Helsinki	4×100 m medley
Gold medal – first place	2018 Helsinki	4×100 m mixed medley
Gold medal – first place	2019 Kazan	50 m breaststroke
Gold medal – first place	2019 Kazan	4×100 m medley
Bronze medal – third place	2019 Kazan	100 m breaststroke
Summer Youth Olympics
Gold medal – first place	2018 Buenos Aires	4×100 m freestyle
Gold medal – first place	2018 Buenos Aires	4×100 m mixed freestyle
Gold medal – first place	2018 Buenos Aires	4×100 m medley
Silver medal – second place	2018 Buenos Aires	4×100 m mixed medley

Vladislav Gerasimenko (born 26 April 2001) is a Russian competitive swimmer. He is a world junior record holder in the long course 4×100 metre medley relay, swimming a 59.53 for the breaststroke portion of the relay. He is a four-time medalist at the 2018 Summer Youth Olympics and a five-time medalist at the World Junior Swimming Championships, spanning breaststroke and freestyle disciplines. He competed at the 2021 European Short Course Swimming Championships, placing sixteenth in the preliminaries of the 50 metre breaststroke.

== Background ==
Gerasimenko was born 26 April 2001 in Russia. He competes for the Kaluga Oblast region in Russian competitions.

== Career ==
=== 2017 ===
2017 World Junior Championships
Gold medal – first place	4×100 m medley	3:36.30 (h)
Bronze medal – third place	4×100 m mixed medley	3:48.32 (h)

As a 16-year-old competing at the 2017 European Youth Summer Olympic Festival in Győr, Hungary in July, Gerasimenko won the gold medal in the 100 metre breaststroke with a time of 1:02.20, placed sixth in the 200 metre breaststroke at 2:19.29, and won gold medals as part of both the 4×100 metre medley relay and 4×100 metre mixed medley relay swimming the breaststroke leg of the relays in the final. At the 2017 World Junior Swimming Championships held at the Indiana University Natatorium in Indianapolis, United States in August, he placed 5th in the 50 metre breaststroke with a 27.82, 13th in the 100 metre breastroke with a 1:02.14, won a gold medal in the 4×100 metre medley relay for his prelims relay contribution swimming the breaststroke leg in 1:01.51, and won a bronze medal as part of the 4×100 metre mixed medley relay contributing a split of 1:01.77 for the breaststroke leg in the prelims.

=== 2018 ===
==== 2018 European Junior Championships ====
In July 2018, Gerasimenko won the gold medal in the 50 metre breaststroke with a time of 28.03 seconds at the 2018 European Junior Swimming Championships in Helsinki, Finland. For his second individual event, he won the gold medal in the 100 metre breaststroke with a time of 1:01.36. He also won gold medals in the 4×100 metre medley relay, with a final relay time of 3:35.58, and the 4×100 metre mixed medley relay, in a Championships record and European junior record time of 3:47.99, swimming breaststroke in the final for each relay.

==== 2018 Summer Youth Olympics ====
2018 Summer Youth Olympics
Gold medal – first place	4×100 m mixed freestyle	3:28.50 (h)
Gold medal – first place	4×100 m freestyle	3:18.11
Gold medal – first place	4×100 m medley	3:35.17 (WJ)
Silver medal – second place	4×100 m mixed medley	3:51.46 (h)

A few months later, in October 2018 at the 2018 Summer Youth Olympics in Buenos Aires, Argentina, Gerasimenko won his first gold medal of the competition on the first day in the 4×100 metre mixed freestyle relay, finals relay time of 3:28.50, for his contributions in the prelims heats and placed seventh in the final of the 100 metre breaststroke the following day with a time of 1:02.43. The third day of competition, Gerasimenko split a 51.56 for the third leg of the 4×100 metre freestyle relay to help win the gold medal with fellow finals relay teammates Kliment Kolesnikov, Daniil Markov, and Andrey Minakov in a time of 3:18.11. In the final of the 4×100 metre medley relay the following day, he split a 1:01.50 for the breaststroke leg of the relay to contribute to a gold medal win in a world junior record time of 3:35.17. On the sixth and final day of competition, he swam breaststroke in the prelims heats of the 4×100 metre mixed medley relay, winning a silver medal for his efforts when the relay placed second with a 3:51.46 in the final, and placed sixth in the final of the 50 metre breaststroke, his final individual event of the competition, with a time of 28.36 seconds.

=== 2019 ===
==== 2019 European Junior Championships ====
For the 50 metre breaststroke at the 2019 European Junior Swimming Championships, held at the Palace of Water Sports in Kazan in July, Gerasimenko won the gold medal with a time of 27.89 seconds. In the final of the 100 metre breaststroke, he tied for third place with a time of 1:00.84. He also won a gold medal as part of the 4×100 metre medley relay, swimming the breaststroke leg of the relay in the prelims heats with a time of 1:03.76.

==== 2019 World Junior Championships ====
2019 World Junior Championships
Gold medal – first place	100 m breaststroke	59.97
Gold medal – first place	50 m breaststroke	27.58
Gold medal – first place	4×100 m medley	3:33.19 (WJ, CR)

On the second day of the 2019 World Junior Swimming Championships, held at Danube Arena in Budapest, Hungary in August, Gerasimenko won the gold medal in the 100 metre breaststroke with a time of 59.97 seconds, finishing 0.20 seconds ahead of silver medalist in the event Josh Matheny of the United States. His time set a new Russian national age group record for boys aged 18 years old and younger and broke the former record of 1:00.12 set in 2015 by Anton Chupkov, it also made him the eighth-fastest male Russian swimmer in the event in history. The sixth and final day of competition, he won the gold medal in the 50 metre breaststroke with a time of 27.58 seconds. Later in the same session, he won a gold medal in the 4×100 metre medley relay, helping set a new world record and Championships record of 3:33.19 with relay teammates Nikolay Zuev, Andrey Minakov, and Aleksandr Shchegolev by swimming the breaststroke 100 metre portion of the relay in 59.53 seconds.

=== 2021 ===
In October 2021, Gerasimenko competed at the fourth stop of the 2021 Swimming World Cup, held in Kazan and conducted in short course metres, placing 16th in his first event, the 100 metre breaststroke, with a time of 59.76 seconds. The next day he swam a 27.39 to place 17th in the 50 metre breaststroke. For the third and final day of competition, he swam a personal best time of 2:16.43 in the 200 metre breaststroke prelims heats and placing 18th overall. Following the Swimming World Cup, Gerasimenko competed at his first senior international championships, the 2021 European Short Course Swimming Championships in Kazan in November, where he placed 16th in the prelims heats of the 50 metre breaststroke and did not advance to the semifinals as he was the fourth-fastest Russian swimmer in the prelims heats with his time of 26.80 seconds and only the fastest two were eligible to advance.

=== 2022: Two different-scale bans for his nationality ===
Gerasimenko was declared not welcome at European swimming competitions organized by LEN as part of a ban applied to all Russian and Belarusian nationals starting 3 March 2022, effective immediately, and continuing indefinitely. He was further banned from world competitions organized by FINA on 21 April 2022, part of a similar dissent propagated by FINA against all Russians and Belarusians in the form of excluding nationals from those countries at their events for at least the period of time lasting through 31 December 2022. For the rest of the 2022 year, his and other Russians's times were not counted towards world rankings nor world records regardless of the competition they were achieved at.

=== 2023 ===
On 5 April 2023, World Aquatics announced the ban on Russian and Belarusians athletes at their competitions was still in effect, indefinitely extending their ban.

2023 Russian Championships (LC)
Bronze medal – third place	4×100 m freestyle	3:17.06

On the first morning of the 2023 Russian National Championships, in April at the Palace of Water Sports in Kazan, Gerasimenko ranked sixth in the preliminaries of the 100 metre breaststroke with a time of 1:01.28 and qualified for the evening semifinals. He sped up to a 1:00.75 in the semifinals, ranked ninth, and received a b-classification. Later in the evening session, he won a bronze medal as part of the Kaluga Oblast region relay team in the 4×100 metre freestyle relay, swimming the lead-off leg of the relay in 50.09 seconds to contribute to the final time of 3:17.06. He placed 22nd in the 50 metre freestyle preliminaries on the third morning with a time of 23.06 seconds.

In the morning preliminaries of the 50 metre breaststroke on day five, Gerasimenko ranked eleventh with a time of 27.78 seconds and advanced to the evening semifinals. In the semifinals, he received a b-classification for his time of 27.90 seconds and overall rank of twelfth across both semifinal heats. The following day, the final day of the Championships, he split a 49.82 for the freestyle leg of the 4×100 metre medley relay, helping place fourth with a 3:36.39.

== International championships ==
Meet	50 breaststroke	100 breaststroke	200 breaststroke	4×100 freestyle	4×100 medley	4×100 mixed freestyle	4×100 mixed medley
EYOF 2017	—N/a	1st place, gold medalist(s)	6th		1st place, gold medalist(s)		1st place, gold medalist(s)
WJC 2017	5th	13th			(gold) ^{[a]}		(bronze) ^{[a]}
EJC 2018	1st place, gold medalist(s)	1st place, gold medalist(s)			1st place, gold medalist(s)		1st place, gold medalist(s)
YOG 2018	6th	7th		1st place, gold medalist(s)	1st place, gold medalist(s)	(gold) ^{[a]}	(gold) ^{[a]}
EJC 2019	1st place, gold medalist(s)	3rd place, bronze medalist(s)			(gold) ^{[a]}		
WJC 2019	1st place, gold medalist(s)	1st place, gold medalist(s)			1st place, gold medalist(s)		
ESC 2021	16th (h)			—N/a	—N/a	—N/a	—N/a

^{a} Gerasimenko swam only in the prelims heats.

== Personal best times ==
=== Long course metres (50 m pool) ===
Event	Time	Meet	Location	Date	Age	Ref
100 m freestyle	49.88	2022 Russian Solidarity Games	Kazan	21 July 2022	21	
50 m breaststroke	27.29	2021 Russian National Championships	Kazan	5 April 2021	19	
100 m breaststroke	59.97	2019 World Junior Championships	Budapest, Hungary	21 August 2019	18	
200 m breaststroke	2:18.74	2018 Luxembourg Euro Meet	Kirchberg, Luxembourg	27 January 2018	16	

=== Short course metres (25 m pool) ===
Event	Time		Meet	Location	Date	Age	Ref
50 m breaststroke	26.76		2019 Vladimir Salnikov Cup	Saint Petersburg	20 December 2019	18	
100 m breaststroke	58.19		2019 Vladimir Salnikov Cup	Saint Petersburg	21 December 2019	18	
200 m breaststroke	2:16.43	h	2021 Swimming World Cup	Kazan	30 October 2021	20	

Legend: h – prelims heat

== Records ==
=== World junior records ===
==== Long course metres (50 m pool) ====
No.	Event	Time	Meet	Location	Date	Status	Age	Ref
1	4×100 m medley relay	3:35.17	2018 Summer Youth Olympics	Buenos Aires, Argentina	10 October 2018	17	Former	
2	4×100 m medley relay (2)	3:33.19	2019 World Junior Championships	Budapest, Hungary	25 August 2019	18	Current	
