= 2021 FINA World Swimming Championships (25 m) – Men's 4 × 50 metre freestyle relay =

Swimming competition

Men's 4 × 50 metre freestyle relay at the 2021 FINA World Swimming Championships (25 m)
- Venue: Etihad Arena
- Location: Abu Dhabi, United Arab Emirates
- Dates: 19 December (heats and final)
- Competitors: 55 from 13 nations
- Teams: 13
- Winning time: 1:23.61

Medalists
| gold medal | Leonardo Deplano; Lorenzo Zazzeri; Manuel Frigo; Alessandro Miressi | Italy |
| silver medal | Andrey Minakov; Vladimir Morozov; Vladislav Grinev; Aleksandr Shchegolev; Daniil Markov |
| bronze medal | Jesse Puts; Stan Pijnenburg; Kenzo Simons; Thom de Boer; Thomas Verhoeven | Netherlands |

The Men's 4 × 50 metre freestyle relay competition of the 2021 FINA World Swimming Championships (25 m) was held on 19 December 2021.

== Records ==
Prior to the competition, the existing world and championship records were as follows.

| World record | United States (USA) | 1:21.80 | Hangzhou, China | 14 December 2018 |
| Competition record | United States (USA) | 1:21.80 | Hangzhou, China | 14 December 2018 |

== Results ==
=== Heats ===
The heats were started at 09:30.

| Rank | Heat | Lane | Nation | Swimmers | Time | Notes |
|---|---|---|---|---|---|---|
| 1 | 1 | 4 | Italy | Leonardo Deplano (21.49); Alessandro Miressi (21.12); Manuel Frigo (21.39); Lorenzo Zazzeri (20.95) | 1:24.95 | Q |
| 1 | 2 | 5 | Russian Swimming Federation | Vladimir Morozov (21.33); Daniil Markov (21.47); Vladislav Grinev (21.01); Aleksandr Shchegolev (21.14) | 1:24.95 | Q |
| 3 | 1 | 1 | United States | Zach Apple (21.62); Hunter Tapp (21.53); Kieran Smith (21.20); Tom Shields (21.26) | 1:25.61 | Q |
| 4 | 2 | 4 | Netherlands | Stan Pijnenburg (21.52); Kenzo Simons (21.14); Thomas Verhoeven (22.04); Thom de Boer (21.00) | 1:25.70 | Q |
| 5 | 1 | 7 | China | Zhang Zhoujian (21.82); Wang Changhao (21.22); Pan Zhanle (21.60); Yang Jintong (21.94) | 1:26.58 | Q, NR |
| 6 | 2 | 7 | Belgium | Jasper Aerents (21.42); Jérôme Emo (22.00); Sebastien De Meulemeester (21.76); Thomas Thijs (21.64) | 1:26.82 | Q |
| 7 | 1 | 6 | Switzerland | Roman Mityukov (22.27); Thomas Hallock (21.74); Antonio Djakovic (21.60); Noè Ponti (21.44) | 1:27.05 | Q |
| 8 | 2 | 8 | Lithuania | Danas Rapšys (21.92); Simonas Bilis (21.15); Andrius Šidlauskas (22.23); Deividas Margevičius (21.98) | 1:27.28 | Q |
| 9 | 2 | 1 | South Korea | Hwang Sun-woo (21.72 NR); Kim Woo-min (22.21); Won Young-jun (22.20); Lee Ho-joon (22.43) | 1:28.56 | NR |
| 10 | 2 | 2 | Hong Kong | Ng Cheuk Yin (22.45); Ian Ho (20.96); Ng Yan Kin (23.10); Cheuk Ming Ho (22.53) | 1:29.04 | NR |
| 11 | 1 | 3 | Turkey | Emre Sakçı (21.61); Doruk Tekin (22.97); Rasim Oğulcan Gör (22.35); Metin Aydın (22.49) | 1:29.42 | |
| 12 | 2 | 6 | Vietnam | Hồ Nguyễn Duy Khoa (23.83); Nguyễn Hữu Kim Sơn (23.76); Trần Hưng Nguyên (23.43); Phạm Thanh Bảo (25.11) | 1:36.13 | |
| | 1 | 5 | Poland | Paweł Juraszek (21.93); Jakub Majerski; Kacper Stokowski; Marcin Cieślak | DSQ | |
| | 1 | 2 | Slovakia | | DNS | |
| | 2 | 3 | Great Britain | | DNS | |

=== Final ===
The final was held at 18:00.

| Rank | Lane | Nation | Swimmers | Time | Notes |
|---|---|---|---|---|---|
| 1st place, gold medalist(s) | 4 | Italy | Leonardo Deplano (21.37); Lorenzo Zazzeri (20.42); Manuel Frigo (21.21); Alessandro Miressi (20.61) | 1:23.61 | |
| 2nd place, silver medalist(s) | 5 | Russian Swimming Federation | Andrey Minakov (21.14); Vladimir Morozov (20.61); Vladislav Grinev (20.72); Aleksandr Shchegolev (21.28) | 1:23.75 | |
| 3rd place, bronze medalist(s) | 6 | Netherlands | Jesse Puts (21.30); Stan Pijnenburg (20.91); Kenzo Simons (21.16); Thom de Boer (20.41) | 1:23.78 | |
| 4 | 3 | United States | Ryan Held (20.72); Shaine Casas (20.73); Zach Apple (21.06); Kieran Smith (21.30) | 1:23.81 | |
| 5 | 2 | China | Zhang Zhoujian (21.67); Wang Changhao (20.88); Pan Zhanle (21.14); Yang Jintong (21.81) | 1:25.50 | NR |
| 6 | 7 | Belgium | Jasper Aerents (21.60); Jérôme Emo (22.16); Sebastien De Meulemeester (21.56); Thomas Thijs (21.62) | 1:26.94 | |
| 7 | 8 | Lithuania | Danas Rapšys (21.94); Simonas Bilis (21.33); Andrius Šidlauskas (22.01); Deividas Margevičius (21.81) | 1:27.09 | |
| 8 | 1 | Switzerland | Roman Mityukov (22.31); Thomas Hallock (21.43); Antonio Djakovic (21.61); Noè Ponti (21.75) | 1:27.10 | |
