= Swimming at the 2018 Summer Youth Olympics – Boys' 4 × 100 metre medley relay =

Boys' 4 × 100 metre medley relay at the 2018 Summer Youth Olympics
- Venue: Natatorium
- Dates: 10 October
- Competitors: 36 from 9 nations
- Winning time: 3:35.17

Medalists
| gold medal | Kliment Kolesnikov; Vladislav Gerasimenko; Andrei Minakov; Daniil Markov | Russia |
| silver medal | Wang Guanbin; Sun Jiajun; Shen Jiahao; Hong Jinquan | China |
| bronze medal | Jakub Kraska; Jan Kałusowski; Jakub Majerski; Bartłomiej Koziejko | Poland |

The boys' 4 × 100 metre medley relay event at the 2018 Summer Youth Olympics took place on 10 October at the Natatorium in Buenos Aires, Argentina.

== Results ==
=== Heats ===
The heats were started at 11:01.

| Rank | Heat | Lane | Name | Nationality | Time | Notes |
|---|---|---|---|---|---|---|
| 1 | 2 | 7 | Kliment Kolesnikov (53.62); Vladislav Gerasimenko (1:02.27); Andrei Minakov (55.58); Daniil Markov (52.03) | Russia | 3:43.50 | Q |
| 2 | 1 | 3 | Jakub Kraska (56.62); Jan Kałusowski (1:03.71); Jakub Majerski (52.64); Bartłomiej Koziejko (52.34) | Poland | 3:45.31 | Q |
| 3 | 1 | 6 | Keisuke Yoshida (59.16); Yu Hanaguruma (1:01.66); Shinnosuke Ishikawa (52.41); Taku Taniguchi (52.11) | Japan | 3:45.34 | Q |
| 4 | 1 | 2 | Gábor Zombori (56.76); Sebestyén Böhm (1:03.56); Kristóf Milák (52.58); Ákos Kalmár (52.51) | Hungary | 3:45.41 | Q |
| 5 | 2 | 4 | Wang Guanbin (56.93); Sun Jiajun (1:02.65); Shen Jiahao (53.34); Hong Jinquan (52.82) | China | 3:45.74 | Q |
| 6 | 1 | 4 | Sebastian Somerset (57.24); Alexander Milanovich (1:03.51); Joshua Liendo (53.58); Finlay Knox (51.90) | Canada | 3:46.23 | Q |
| 7 | 1 | 5 | Johannes Calloni (57.13); Thomas Ceccon (1:05.77); Federico Burdisso (52.58); Marco De Tullio (51.83) | Italy | 3:47.31 | Q |
| 8 | 2 | 5 | Hendrik Duvenhage (58.80); Michael Houlie (1:00.78); Ethan du Preez (56.97); Gabriel Nortje (51.23) | South Africa | 3:47.78 | Q |
| 9 | 2 | 6 | Ethan Harder (57.01); Ethan Dang (1:03.47); Jake Johnson (54.97); Will Barao (52.46) | United States | 3:47.91 | |
| | 2 | 2 | | Australia | DNS | |
| | 2 | 3 | | Brazil | DNS | |

=== Final ===
The final was held at 19:32.

| Rank | Lane | Name | Nationality | Time | Notes |
|---|---|---|---|---|---|
| 1st place, gold medalist(s) | 4 | Kliment Kolesnikov (53.34); Vladislav Gerasimenko (1:01.50); Andrei Minakov (51.14); Daniil Markov (49.19) | Russia | 3:35.17 | WJ |
| 2nd place, silver medalist(s) | 2 | Wang Guanbin (55.82); Sun Jiajun (1:00.12); Shen Jiahao (52.65); Hong Jinquan (50.06) | China | 3:38.65 | |
| 3rd place, bronze medalist(s) | 5 | Jakub Kraska (55.79); Jan Kałusowski (1:01.92); Jakub Majerski (52.00); Bartłomiej Koziejko (51.80) | Poland | 3:41.51 | |
| 4 | 6 | Gábor Zombori (56.40); Sebestyén Böhm (1:02.75); Kristóf Milák (51.87); Ákos Kalmár (52.58) | Hungary | 3:43.60 | |
| 5 | 1 | Johannes Calloni (56.83); Thomas Ceccon (1:03.42); Federico Burdisso (52.83); Marco De Tullio (52.15) | Italy | 3:45.23 | |
| 6 | 7 | Sebastian Somerset (57.10); Alexander Milanovich (1:03.29); Joshua Liendo (53.89); Finlay Knox ( 51.17) | Canada | 3:45.45 | |
| 7 | 8 | Hendrik Duvenhage (57.98); Michael Houlie (1:01.08); Ethan du Preez (55.95); Gabriel Nortje (50.89) | South Africa | 3:45.90 | |
| | 3 | Keisuke Yoshida (1:00.11); Yu Hanaguruma (1:02.39); Shinnosuke Ishikawa; Taku Taniguchi | Japan | DSQ | |
