= Julien Berol =

French swimmer (born 2001)

Personal information
- Nationality: French
- Born: 9 September 2001 (age 24)

Sport
- Sport: Swimming

Julien Berol (born 9 September 2001) is a French swimmer. He competed in the men's 100 metre freestyle event at the 2020 European Aquatics Championships, in Budapest, Hungary.
