= Daniil Markov (swimmer) =

Russian swimmer

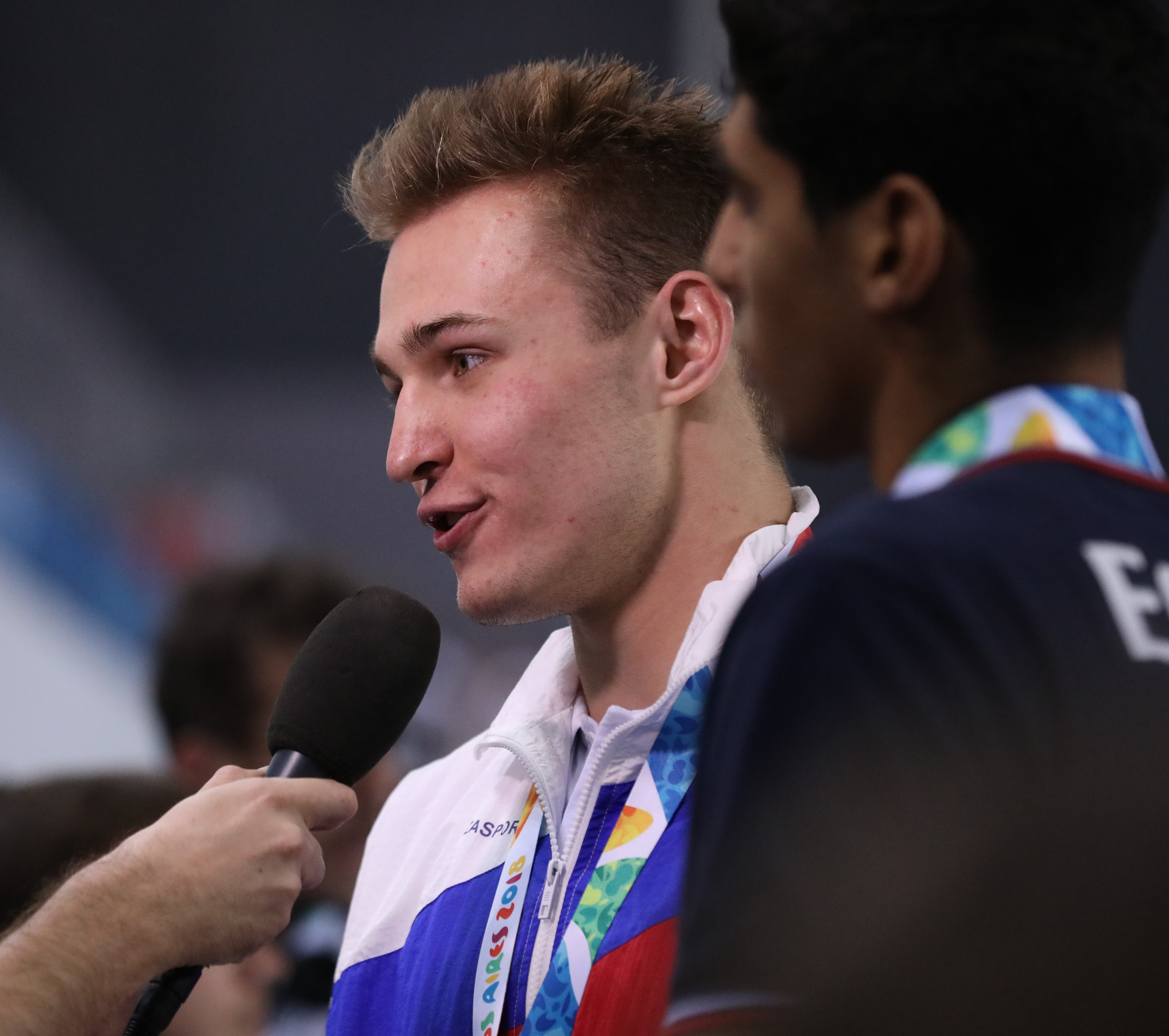
- Markov in 2018

Personal information
- Full name: Daniil Dmitrievich Markov
- National team: Russia
- Born: 21 April 2000 (age 26) Russia

Sport
- Sport: Swimming
- Strokes: Freestyle, butterfly
- Coach: Alexander Martynov
Medal record
Men's swimming
Event	1st	2nd	3rd
World Championships (SC)	1	1	1
European Championships (SC)	1	1	0
Swimming World Cup	1	2	0
Summer Youth Olympics	3	3	0
Total	6	7	1
Representing Russian Swimming Federation
World Championships (SC)
Gold medal – first place	2021 Abu Dhabi	4×100 m freestyle
Silver medal – second place	2021 Abu Dhabi	4×50 m freestyle
Bronze medal – third place	2021 Abu Dhabi	4×50 m mixed freestyle
Representing Russia
European Championships (SC)
Gold medal – first place	2019 Glasgow	4×50 m freestyle
Silver medal – second place	2021 Kazan	4×50 m medley
Swimming World Cup
Gold medal – first place	2021 Kazan	4×50 m mixed freestyle
Silver medal – second place	2018 Kazan	4×100 m mixed freestyle
Silver medal – second place	2021 Kazan	4×50 m mixed medley
World University Games
Bronze medal – third place	2019 Naples	50 m freestyle
Summer Youth Olympics
Gold medal – first place	2018 Buenos Aires	4×100 m freestyle
Gold medal – first place	2018 Buenos Aires	4×100 m mixed freestyle
Gold medal – first place	2018 Buenos Aires	4×100 m medley
Silver medal – second place	2018 Buenos Aires	50 m freestyle
Silver medal – second place	2018 Buenos Aires	50 m butterfly
Silver medal – second place	2018 Buenos Aires	4×100 m mixed medley
European Junior Championships
Gold medal – first place	2018 Helsinki	4×100 m freestyle
Gold medal – first place	2018 Helsinki	4×100 m medley
Bronze medal – third place	2018 Helsinki	50 m butterfly

Daniil Dmitrievich Markov (born 21 April 2000) is a Russian competitive swimmer. As a member of preliminaries relays he won three medals at the 2021 World Short Course Championships and two medals across the 2019 and 2021 European Short Course Championships. In the 50 metre freestyle, he won the bronze medal at the 2019 Summer Universiade and the silver medal at the 2018 Summer Youth Olympics. In the 50 metre butterfly, he won the silver medal at the 2018 Summer Youth Olympics and the bronze medal at the 2018 European Junior Swimming Championships. He is a former world junior record holder in the 4×100 metre medley relay.

== Background ==
Markov was born 21 April 2000 in Russia. He competes for the Novosibirsk Oblast and Krasnoyarsk Krai regions in Russian competitions.

== Career ==
=== 2018 ===
==== 2018 European Junior Championships ====
2018 European Junior Championships
Gold medal – first place	4×100 m freestyle	3:18.21
Gold medal – first place	4×100 m medley	3:35.58
Bronze medal – third place	50 m butterfly	23.77

At the 2018 European Junior Swimming Championships in Helsinki, Finland in July, Markov swam a personal best time in the 100 metres of freestyle he swam leading off the 4×100 metre freestyle relay in the prelims on day one of competition, 4 July, with a time of 49.44 seconds. In the final of the event later the same day, he helped the finals relay team achieve a gold medal-winning time of 3:18.21 by splitting a 50.12 for the lead-off leg of the relay. In the final of the 50 metre butterfly during the same finals session as the 4×100 metre freestyle relay final, Markov won the bronze medal with a time of 23.77 seconds, finishing just 0.21 seconds behind gold medalist Andrei Minakov, also of Russia, and 0.09 seconds after silver medalist Tomoe Hvas of Norway. Markov won his third and final medal of the Championships on the last day of competition, anchoring the 4×100 metre medley relay with a time of 49.45 seconds for his 100-metre portion of freestyle and finishing the relay at a time of 3:35.58 to win the gold medal along with relay teammates Kliment Kolesnikov, Vladislav Gerasimenko, and Andrei Minakov.

==== 2018 Swimming World Cup: Kazan ====
Gaining addition racing experience after the European Junior Championships and before the 2018 Summer Youth Olympics, Markov competed at the 2018 Swimming World Cup stop in Kazan at the Palace of Water Sports and conducted in long course metres. In the prelims heats of the 50 metre freestyle, Markov qualified for the final ranking eighth with a time of 23.10 seconds. In the final, he swam the 50 metres of freestyle in 23.11 seconds to place eighth. For the 4×100 metre freestyle relay the next day, Markov split 50.54 seconds for the second leg of the relay, helping it achieve a time of 3:30.94 and win the silver medal in the event.

==== 2018 Summer Youth Olympics ====
2018 Summer Youth Olympics
Gold medal – first place	4×100 m mixed freestyle	3:28.50 (h)
Gold medal – first place	4×100 m freestyle	3:18.11
Gold medal – first place	4×100 m medley	3:35.17 (WJ)
Silver medal – second place	50 m freestyle	22.37
Silver medal – second place	50 m butterfly	23.63
Silver medal – second place	4×100 m mixed medley	3:51.46 (h)

On the first day of the 2018 Summer Youth Olympics in Buenos Aires, Argentina, Markov won his first gold medal in the 4×100 metre mixed freestyle relay for his efforts in the prelims heats, where he swam a 50.28 for the lead-off leg of the relay to qualify the relay to the final ranked eighth. For his next event, the 100 metre butterfly, Markov swam a personal best time of 53.91 seconds in the prelims heats before placing 13th overall in the semifinals with a time of 54.07 seconds. Day three of competition, Markov ranked first in the semifinals of the 50 metre freestyle with a time of 22.30 seconds and qualified for the final. Following his semifinals performance, Markov won a gold medal in the 4×100 metre freestyle relay with finals relay members Kliment Kolesnikov, Vladislav Gerasimenko, and Andrei Minakov in a time of 3:18.11. On day four, Markov won his first individual medal of the Youth Olympic Games in the 50 metre freestyle, placing second and winning the silver medal in a time of 22.37 seconds, which was just 0.04 seconds slower than gold medalist Thomas Ceccon of Italy. Later in the day, Markov won a gold medal and set a world junior record in the 4×100 metre medley relay at 3:35.17, splitting a 49.19 for the freestyle leg of the relay.

The fifth day of competition, Markov won a silver medal in the 50 metre butterfly, finishing second with a time of 23.63 seconds, which was 0.01 seconds behind gold medalist Andrei Minakov and a time Tomoe Hvas tied by finishing at the exact same time, resulting in both Markov and Tomoe Hvas earning silver medals. Earlier on day five he competed in the 100 metre freestyle prelims heats, placing seventh overall with a time of 50.60 seconds, qualifying for the semifinals and choosing to withdraw from competition following the prelims stage of competition. On the sixth and final day, Markov competed in his eighth event and won his sixth medal, contributing to the silver medal win in the 4×100 metre mixed medley relay by swimming the butterfly leg of the relay in the prelims and helping qualify the relay to the final ranked third, he won a silver medal when the finals relay finished second in a time of 3:51.46.

=== 2019 ===
==== 2019 World University Games ====
On 4 July 2019, at the 2019 World University Games conducted at Piscina Felice Scandone in Naples, Italy, Markov ranked sixth in the semifinals of the 50 metre butterfly with a time of 23.78 seconds, qualifying for the final the next day. In the final of the 50 metre butterfly on 5 July, he placed sixth with a time of 23.91 seconds. Four days later, Markov tied for eighth placed in the semifinals of the 50 metre freestyle and had to compete in a swim-off where he and the person he tied, Cameron Kidd of Canada, raced each other and the faster swimmer, Markov with a time of 22.23 seconds, qualified for the final of the event. Come the final of the event the following day, 10 July, Markov won the bronze medal in the event with a time of 22.39 seconds.

==== 2019 European Short Course Championships ====
2019 European Championships (SC)
Gold medal – first place	4×50 m freestyle	1:22.92 (h)

At the Tollcross International Swimming Centre in Glasgow, Scotland on 4 December for the 2019 European Short Course Swimming Championships, Markov swum the second leg of the 4×50 metre freestyle relay in a time of 21.36 seconds in the prelims heats, helping advance the relay to the final of the event ranking first at 1:25.07. When the Russia finals relay, which did not include Markov, finished first in the final of the event with a time of 1:22.92, all the Russia relay team swimmers in the prelims and the final won a gold medal for their contributions to the win.

=== 2021 ===
==== 2021 Swimming World Cup: Kazan ====
2021 World Cup – Kazan
Gold medal – first place	4×50 m mixed freestyle	1:33.73
Silver medal – second place	4×50 m mixed medley	1:40.83

On the first day of the 2021 Swimming World Cup stop in Kazan, 28 October, Markov qualified for the final of the 50 metre freestyle ranked sixth with a time of 21.51 seconds from the prelims heats. In the final of the 50 metre freestyle the same day, he placed fifth in 21.40 seconds. The next day, Markov swam a personal best time of 47.18 seconds in the prelims heats of the 100 metre freestyle, advancing to the final of the event ranked sixth. For the final he placed eighth, finishing in a time of 47.81 seconds. Later in the same finals session, Markov led-off the 4×50 metre mixed freestyle relay in a time of 21.62 seconds in the final to help attain a gold medal victory in a time of 1:33.73. Day three, the final day of competition, Markov advanced to the final of the 50 metre butterfly with his time of 22.87 seconds in the prelims heats. Markov placed fourth in the final, swimming a time of 22.57 seconds and finishing less than a quarter of a second behind the bronze medalist in the event, Kyle Chalmers of Australia. In his final event, Markov won a silver medal in the final of the 4×50 metre mixed medley relay, splitting a time of 21.30 seconds for the freestyle leg of the relay to contribute to the total time of 1:40.83.

==== 2021 European Short Course Championships ====
2021 European Championships (SC)
Silver medal – second place	4×50 m medley	1:30.79 (h)

In the prelims of the 4×50 metre medley relay event at the 2021 European Short Course Swimming Championships in Kazan, Markov split a 22.48 for the butterfly leg of the relay, helping qualify the Russia relay to the final ranked first with a time of 1:32.69. For the finals relay, Vladimir Morozov substituted in for Markov for the butterfly leg and when the finals relay placed second with a time of 1:30.79 all prelims and finals relay team members, including Markov, won a silver medal for their efforts.

==== 2021 World Short Course Championships ====
2021 World Championships (SC)
Gold medal – first place	4×100 m freestyle	3:03.45 (h)
Silver medal – second place	4×50 m freestyle	1:23.75 (h)
Bronze medal – third place	4×50 m mixed freestyle	1:28.97 (h)

Markov was one of the athletes named to the Russia national team for the 2021 World Short Course Championships in Abu Dhabi, United Arab Emirates in December. He and the other members of the team competed using the name Russian Swimming Federation per FINA choice as part of an ongoing Court of Arbitration for Sport ban on Russians not allowing them to use their country name, anthem, and flag at World Championships between 17 December 2020 and 16 December 2022.

In the preliminary heats of the 4×100 metre freestyle relay on day one, Markov split a 47.00 to help qualify the relay to the final ranked first with relay teammates Andrei Minakov, Vladimir Morozov, and Aleksandr Shchegolev. The finals relay, which did not include Markov, placed first and Markov won a gold medal for his prelims contributions. The next day, in the morning prelims session, he split a 21.30 for the second leg of the 4×50 metre mixed freestyle relay, qualifying the relay for the final ranked first with the help of his prelims relay teammates. On the finals relay, Vladimir Morozov substituted in for him and all prelims and finals relay members won the bronze medal when the finals relay finished third in 1:28.97. Day three of competition, he ranked 14th in the prelims heats of the 50 metre freestyle with a time of 21.50 seconds, qualifying for the semifinals in the evening. In the semifinals in the evening, he swam a personal best time of 21.33 seconds, ranked tenth overall, and did not advance to the final of the event. On the fourth day of competition, he split a 21.47 for the second leg of the 4×50 metre freestyle relay in the prelims heats, helping advance the relay tied in rank for first with the relay team from Italy with a time of 1:24.95. For the finals relay, Markov was substituted out, Andrei Minakov substituted in, and the relay won the silver medal in a time of 1:23.75.

=== 2022: Double international ban for being Russian ===
Further competition by Markov on the international circuit in 2022 was shut down first by LEN, then by FINA, with each governing body blanket banning all Russians and Belarusians in response to the 2022 Russian invasion of Ukraine to publicly demonstrate and document their favoritism of Ukraine over Russia and Belarus.

Fighting to keep his national competition career alive, Markov competed at the 2022 Russian Championships held in April at the Palace of Water Sports in Kazan, setting a new personal best time of 21.94 seconds in the long course 50 metre freestyle. At the same Championships, he achieved a personal best time of 21.85 seconds in the final of the 50 metre freestyle, where he won the silver medal, and a personal best time of 49.01 in the 100 metre freestyle for the lead-off leg of the 4×100 metre freestyle relay where he placed fourth. His efforts were not acknowledged by FINA as counting towards their world rankings and world records as the organization also decided to not count times swam by Russians at any competition during the time period they enacted their ban.

Deciding to continue competing nationally, Markov won the silver medal in the short course 50 metre freestyle at the 2022 Russian Solidarity Games on 23 November swimming competition segment in November, finishing in a time of 21.24 seconds after achieving a personal best time of 21.19 seconds in the semifinals on 22 November. In the 100 metre freestyle final three days later, he placed sixth with a personal best time of 47.16 seconds.

=== 2023 ===
2023 Russian Championships (LC)
Bronze medal – third place	50 m freestyle	22.21

In early April, and leading up to the 2023 Russian National Swimming Championships, World Aquatics (a freshly rebranded FINA) announced that its 2022 ban on Russian and Belarusian participation at their events was in effect indefinitely. Starting off the 2023 Russian National Championships on day one, 16 April, Markov swam a 49.95 for the first leg of the 4×100 metre freestyle relay as part of the Novosibirsk Oblast region relay team, helping place fourth with a time of 3:17.36. On the third morning, he ranked ninth in the preliminaries of the 50 metre freestyle with a 22.77 and qualified for the evening semifinals. Lowering his time to 22.32 seconds in the semifinals, he qualified for the final ranking second behind Kliment Kolesnikov. He further improved his time in the final, winning the bronze medal with a time of 22.21 seconds. Earlier in the day, he ranked eleventh in the preliminaries of the 50 metre butterfly with a 24.09 before withdrawing from competing in the evening semifinals. In the 100 metre freestyle preliminaries on day five, he placed twentieth with a time of 50.16 seconds.

== International championships (50 m) ==
Meet	50 freestyle	100 freestyle	50 butterfly	100 butterfly	4×100 freestyle	4×100 medley	4×100 mixed freestyle	4×100 mixed medley
Junior level
EJC 2018	6th (sf)	6th	3rd place, bronze medalist(s)	11th (h)	1st place, gold medalist(s)	1st place, gold medalist(s)		
YOG 2018	2nd place, silver medalist(s)	7th (h,WD)	2nd place, silver medalist(s)	13th	1st place, gold medalist(s)	1st place, gold medalist(s)	(gold) ^{[a]}	(silver) ^{[a]}
Senior level
WUG 2019	3rd place, bronze medalist(s)		6th		5th^{[a]}			

^{a} Markov swam only in the preliminaries.

== International championships (25 m) ==
Meet	50 freestyle	50 butterfly	100 butterfly	4×50 freestyle	4×100 freestyle	4×50 medley	4×50 mixed freestyle
EC 2019	18th	8th (h)	26th	(gold) ^{[a]}	—N/a		
EC 2021		7th			—N/a	(silver) ^{[a]}	DSQ^{[a]}^{[b]}
WC 2021	10th			(silver) ^{[a]}	(gold) ^{[a]}		(bronze) ^{[a]}

^{a} Markov swam only in the preliminaries.
^{b} Markov was not a relay member on the finals relay that was disqualified.

== Personal best times ==
=== Long course metres (50 m pool) ===
Event	Time		Meet	Location	Date	Ref
50 m freestyle	21.85		2022 Russian Championships	Kazan	27 April 2022	
100 m freestyle	49.01	r	2022 Russian Championships	Kazan	24 April 2022	
50 m butterfly	23.39		2021 Russian Championships	Kazan	4 April 2021	
100 m butterfly	53.91	h	2018 Summer Youth Olympics	Buenos Aires, Argentina	8 October 2018	

Legend: h – heat; r – relay 1st leg

=== Short course metres (25 m pool) ===
Event	Time		Meet	Location	Date	Ref
50 m freestyle	21.19	sf	2022 Solidarity Games	Kazan	22 November 2022	
100 m freestyle	47.16		2022 Solidarity Games	Kazan	25 November 2022	
50 m butterfly	22.40		2019 Russian Short Course Championships	Kazan	9 November 2019	
100 m butterfly	50.97		2019 Russian Short Course Championships	Kazan	6 November 2019	

Legend: sf – semifinal

== Records ==
=== World junior records ===
==== Long course metres (50 m pool) ====
No.	Event	Time	Meet	Location	Date	Status	Age	Ref
1	4×100 m medley relay	3:35.17	2018 Summer Youth Olympics	Buenos Aires, Argentina	10 October 2018	18	Former	
