= Swimming at the 2018 Summer Youth Olympics – Mixed 4 × 100 metre freestyle relay =

Mixed 4 × 100 metre freestyle relay at the 2018 Summer Youth Olympics
- Venue: Natatorium
- Dates: 7 October
- Competitors: 86 from 20 nations
- Winning time: 3:28.50

Medalists
gold medal	Kliment Kolesnikov; Andrei Minakov; Polina Egorova; Elizaveta Klevanovich; Daniil Markov; Vladislav Gerasimenko; Daria Vaskina; Anastasia Makarova	Russia
silver medal	Lucas Peixoto; Ana Vieira; André Calvelo; Rafaela Raurich	Brazil
bronze medal	Shen Jiahao; Hong Jinquan; Lin Xintong; Yang Junxuan	China

The mixed 4 × 100 metre freestyle relay event at the 2018 Summer Youth Olympics took place on 7 October at the Natatorium in Buenos Aires, Argentina.

== Results ==
=== Heats ===
The heats were started at 11:27.

Rank	Heat	Lane	Name	Nationality	Time	Notes
1	1	3	Lucas Peixoto (50.20); Ana Vieira (55.91); André Calvelo (49.64); Rafaela Raurich (55.17)	Brazil	3:30.92	Q
2	3	7	Denis Loktev (50.48); Gal Cohen Groumi (50.88); Anastasia Gorbenko (55.38); Lea Polonsky (56.83)	Israel	3:33.57	Q
3	3	4	Shen Jiahao (51.01); Hong Jinquan (50.61); Lin Xintong (56.58); Yang Junxuan (55.56)	China	3:33.76	Q
4	3	3	Rafael Miroslaw (50.27); Luca Armbruster (51.41); Angelina Köhler (56.75); Julia Mrozinski (55.66)	Germany	3:34.09	Q
5	2	4	Ashton Brinkworth (50.36); Joseph Jackson (51.43); Michaela Ryan (56.18); Abbey Webb (56.51)	Australia	3:34.48	Q
6	1	4	Shinnosuke Ishikawa (52.09); Nagisa Ikemoto (54.52); Mayuka Yamamoto (55.39); Taku Taniguchi (53.95)	Japan	3:35.95	Q
7	1	5	Jakub Kraska (50.08); Jakub Majerski (50.19); Kornelia Fiedkiewicz (57.39); Karolina Jurczyk (59.03)	Poland	3:36.69	Q
8	2	3	Daniil Markov (50.28); Vladislav Gerasimenko (51.83); Daria Vaskina (57.20); Anastasia Makarova (57.67)	Russia	3:36.98	Q
9	3	6	Michael Pickett (50.77); Erika Fairweather (56.53); Gina Galloway (58.90); Zac Reid (51.32)	New Zealand	3:37.52	
10	3	5	Antonio Djakovic (50.77); Noè Ponti (50.85); Leoni Richter (57.30); Elena Onieva Henrich (59.56)	Switzerland	3:38.48	
11	2	7	Joshua Liendo (52.23); Finlay Knox (52.61); Kyla Leibel (55.08); Nina Kucheran (59.37)	Canada	3:39.29	
12	3	1	Ong Jung Yi (53.41); Maximillian Ang (53.03); Gan Ching Hwee (58.59); Christie Chue (56.44)	Singapore	3:41.47	
13	3	8	Gabriel Nortje (51.60); Hendrik Duvenhage (53.13); Duné Coetzee (57.95); Kate Beavon (59.28)	South Africa	3:41.96	
14	2	6	Tinky Ho (57.75); Marcus Mok (53.37); Nicholas Lim (52.37); Natalie Kan (58.60)	Hong Kong	3:42.09	
15	3	2	Joaquín González (53.37); Juan Méndez (54.51); Julieta Lema (55.82); Delfina Dini (59.18)	Argentina	3:42.88	
16	1	6	Park Jung-hun (52.60); Lee Yoo-yeon (49.71); Wang Hee-song (1:00.35); Yun Eun-sol (1:00.23)	South Korea	3:42.89	
17	2	1	Marcos Gil (53.36); Ferran Julià (53.23); Tamara Frías (57.83); Andrea Galisteo (58.73)	Spain	3:43.15	
18	2	8	Will Barao (52.95); Ethan Dang (52.84); Maddie Donohoe (58.72); Kate Douglass (59.17)	United States	3:43.68	
19	2	2	Andrés Puente (54.80); Taydé Sansores (59.78); Miriam Guevara (1:00.67); Guillermo Cruz (50.68)	Mexico	3:45.93	
20	2	5	Martín Valdivieso (55.31); Inés Marín (59.21); Trinidad Ardiles (1:03.77); Benjamin Schnapp (53.27)	Chile	3:51.56	

=== Final ===
The final was held at 18:51.

Rank	Lane	Name	Nationality	Time	Notes
1st place, gold medalist(s)	8	Kliment Kolesnikov (48.17); Andrei Minakov (49.60); Polina Egorova (55.71); Elizaveta Klevanovich (55.02)	Russia	3:28.50	
2nd place, silver medalist(s)	4	Lucas Peixoto (50.30); Ana Vieira (55.93); André Calvelo (48.66); Rafaela Raurich (55.24)	Brazil	3:30.13	
3rd place, bronze medalist(s)	3	Shen Jiahao (50.83); Hong Jinquan (50.46); Lin Xintong (55.44); Yang Junxuan (53.72)	China	3:30.45	
4	6	Rafael Miroslaw (50.49); Luca Armbruster (51.21); Angelina Köhler (56.09); Julia Mrozinski (55.24)	Germany	3:33.03	
5	1	Jakub Kraska (49.12); Jakub Majerski (50.23); Kornelia Fiedkiewicz (57.03); Aleksandra Knop (56.70)	Poland	3:33.08	
6	2	Ashton Brinkworth (50.61); Joseph Jackson (51.56); Michaela Ryan (56.14); Abbey Webb (55.72)	Australia	3:34.03	
7	7	Keisuke Yoshida (51.34); Taku Taniguchi (52.67); Mayuka Yamamoto (55.53); Nagisa Ikemoto (54.64)	Japan	3:34.18	
	5	Denis Loktev (50.56); Gal Cohen Groumi (50.41); Lea Polonsky (57.03); Anastasia Gorbenko	Israel	DSQ	
