= Manuel Frigo =

Italian swimmer (born 1997)

Personal information
- Born: 18 February 1997 (age 29) Cittadella, Italy
- Height: 1.90 m (6 ft 3 in)

Sport
- Sport: Swimming
- Strokes: Freestyle
Medal record
Men's swimming
Representing Italy
Event	1st	2nd	3rd
Olympic Games	0	1	1
World Championships (LC)	0	3	1
World Championships (SC)	2	3	2
European Championships (LC)	2	0	4
Total	4	7	8
Olympic Games
Silver medal – second place	2020 Tokyo	4×100 m freestyle
Bronze medal – third place	2024 Paris	4×100 m freestyle
World Championships (LC)
Silver medal – second place	2023 Fukuoka	4×100 m freestyle
Silver medal – second place	2024 Doha	4×100 m freestyle
Silver medal – second place	2025 Singapore	4×100 m freestyle
Bronze medal – third place	2022 Budapest	4×100 m freestyle
World Championships (SC)
Gold medal – first place	2021 Abu Dhabi	4×50 m freestyle
Gold medal – first place	2022 Melbourne	4×100 m freestyle
Silver medal – second place	2021 Abu Dhabi	4×100 m freestyle
Silver medal – second place	2022 Melbourne	4×50 m freestyle
Silver medal – second place	2024 Budapest	4×100 m freestyle
Bronze medal – third place	2022 Melbourne	4×200 m freestyle
Bronze medal – third place	2024 Budapest	4×200 m freestyle
European Championships (LC)
Gold medal – first place	2022 Roma	4×100 m medley
Gold medal – first place	2022 Rome	4×100 m freestyle
Bronze medal – third place	2020 Budapest	4×100 m freestyle
Bronze medal – third place	2020 Budapest	4×200 m freestyle
Bronze medal – third place	2020 Budapest	4×100 m mixed freestyle
Bronze medal – third place	2026 Paris	4x100 m mixed freestyle
European Championships (SC)
Gold medal – first place	2025 Lublin	4×50 m freestyle

Manuel Frigo (born 18 February 1997) is an Italian swimmer. As part of the men's 4 × 100 metre freestyle relay team, he won silver in the 2020 Summer Olympics and bronze at the 2024 Summer Olympics.
