= Lorenzo Zazzeri =

Italian swimmer (born 1994)

Personal information
- Born: 9 August 1994 (age 32) Florence, Italy
- Height: 1.97 m (6 ft 6 in)
- Weight: 88 kg (194 lb)

Sport
- Sport: Swimming
- Strokes: Freestyle
Medal record
Men's swimming
Representing Italy
Event	1st	2nd	3rd
Olympic Games	0	1	1
World Championships (LC)	1	3	1
World Championships (SC)	3	2	2
European Championships (LC)	0	1	1
European Championships (SC)	1	4	1
Universiade	0	1	0
Total	5	12	6
Olympic Games
Silver medal – second place	2020 Tokyo	4×100 m freestyle
Bronze medal – third place	2024 Paris	4×100 m freestyle
World Championships (LC)
Gold medal – first place	2022 Budapest	4×100 m medley
Silver medal – second place	2023 Fukuoka	4×100 m freestyle
Silver medal – second place	2024 Doha	4×100 m freestyle
Silver medal – second place	2025 Singapore	4×100 m freestyle
Bronze medal – third place	2022 Budapest	4×100 m freestyle
World Championships (SC)
Gold medal – first place	2021 Abu Dhabi	4×50 m freestyle
Gold medal – first place	2021 Abu Dhabi	4×100 m medley
Gold medal – first place	2024 Budapest	4×50 m mixed freestyle
Silver medal – second place	2021 Abu Dhabi	4×100 m freestyle
Silver medal – second place	2024 Budapest	4×100 m freestyle
Bronze medal – third place	2018 Hangzhou	4×50 m freestyle
Bronze medal – third place	2021 Abu Dhabi	4×50 m medley
European Championships (LC)
Gold medal – first place	2022 Rome	4×100 m freestyle
Silver medal – second place	2018 Glasgow	4×100 m freestyle
Bronze medal – third place	2020 Budapest	4×100 m freestyle
European Championships (SC)
Gold medal – first place	2021 Kazan	4×50 m medley
Gold medal – first place	2025 Lublin	4×50 m freestyle
Gold medal – first place	2025 Lublin	4×50 m medley
Gold medal – first place	2025 Lublin	4×50 m mixed freestyle
Silver medal – second place	2017 Copenhagen	4×50 m freestyle
Silver medal – second place	2021 Kazan	50 m freestyle
Silver medal – second place	2021 Kazan	4×50 m freestyle
Silver medal – second place	2021 Kazan	4×50 m mixed freestyle
Bronze medal – third place	2017 Copenhagen	4×50 m mixed freestyle
Universiade
Silver medal – second place	2017 Taipei	4×100 m freestyle

Lorenzo Zazzeri (born 9 August 1994) is an Italian swimmer. He competed at the 2020 Summer Olympics, in Men's 4 × 100 metre freestyle relay, winning a silver medal.

== Career ==
He competed in the men's 4 × 100 metre freestyle relay event at the 2018 European Aquatics Championships, winning the silver medal.

Records
Preceded by (Russia) Kliment Kolesnikov, Kirill Prigoda, Aleksandr Popkov, Vladimir Morozov	Men's 4×50-metre medley relay world record holder 3 November 2021 – 17 December 2022; With: Michele Lamberti, Nicolò Martinenghi, Marco Orsi	Succeeded by (Italy) Lorenzo Mora, Nicolò Martinenghi, Matteo Rivolta, Leonardo Deplano
