= Vladislav Grinev =

Russian swimmer (born 1996)

Personal information
- Full name: Vladislav Sergeyevich Grinev
- Nationality: Russian
- Born: 21 July 1996 (age 30) Moscow, Russia

Sport
- Sport: Swimming
- Strokes: Freestyle
- Club: CSKA Moscow
Medal record
Representing Neutral Athletes B
World Championships (LC)
Silver medal – second place	2025 Singapore	4x100 m mixed freestyle
Representing Russian Swimming Federation
World Championships (SC)
Gold medal – first place	2021 Abu Dhabi	4×100 m freestyle
Silver medal – second place	2021 Abu Dhabi	4×50 m freestyle
Silver medal – second place	2021 Abu Dhabi	4×200 m freestyle
Bronze medal – third place	2021 Abu Dhabi	4×100 m medley
Representing Russia
World Championships (LC)
Silver medal – second place	2019 Gwangju	4×100 m freestyle
Bronze medal – third place	2019 Gwangju	100 m freestyle
Bronze medal – third place	2019 Gwangju	4×100 m medley
World Championships (SC)
Silver medal – second place	2018 Hangzhou	4×100 m freestyle
Silver medal – second place	2018 Hangzhou	4×200 m freestyle
Silver medal – second place	2018 Hangzhou	4×100 m medley
European Championships (LC)
Gold medal – first place	2018 Glasgow	4×100 m freestyle
Gold medal – first place	2020 Budapest	4×100 m freestyle
Silver medal – second place	2018 Glasgow	4×100 m medley
Bronze medal – third place	2018 Glasgow	4×100 m mixed freestyle
European Championships (SC)
Gold medal – first place	2019 Glasgow	4×50 m freestyle
Gold medal – first place	2019 Glasgow	4×50 m medley
Gold medal – first place	2019 Glasgow	4×50 m mixed freestyle
Silver medal – second place	2021 Kazan	4×50 m medley
Bronze medal – third place	2019 Glasgow	100 m freestyle
Bronze medal – third place	2021 Kazan	100 m freestyle
Bronze medal – third place	2021 Kazan	4×50 m freestyle
Military World Games
Gold medal – first place	2019 Wuhan	50 m freestyle
Gold medal – first place	2019 Wuhan	100 m freestyle
Gold medal – first place	2019 Wuhan	4×100 m medley
Silver medal – second place	2019 Wuhan	4×100 m mixed freestyle
Bronze medal – third place	2019 Wuhan	4×100 m freestyle
Bronze medal – third place	2019 Wuhan	4×100 m mixed medley

Vladislav Sergeyevich Grinev (Russian: Владислав Сергеевич Гринев; born 21 July 1996) is a Russian swimmer. He competed in the men's 4 × 100 metre freestyle relay event at the 2018 European Aquatics Championships, winning the gold medal. Grinev broke the national record in 100 m freestyle, which lasted 10 years, on 9 April 2019. He swam 47.43, improving the previous result of Andrey Grechin.
