= Hannah Küchler =

German swimmer

Personal information
- Nationality: German
- Born: 20 April 2002 (age 22); Potsdam, Germany

Sport
- Country: Germany
- Sport: Swimming

Hannah Küchler (born 20 April 2002) is a German swimmer. She competed at the 2020 Summer Olympics, held July–August 2021 in Tokyo.
