= Aleksandr Shchegolev =

Russian swimmer

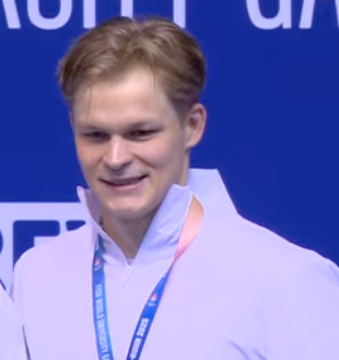
- At the 2025 Summer World University Games

Personal information
- Nationality: Russia
- Born: 6 April 2002 (age 24) Saint Petersburg, Russia

Sport
- Sport: Swimming
Medal record
Men's swimming
Representing Individual Neutral Athletes
European Championships (LC)
Silver medal – second place	2026 Paris	4×100 m freestyle
World University Games
Silver medal – second place	2025 Rhine-Ruhr	4×200 m freestyle
Bronze medal – third place	2025 Rhine-Ruhr	100 m freestyle
Representing Russian Swimming Federation
World Championships (SC)
Gold medal – first place	2021 Abu Dhabi	4×100 m freestyle
Gold medal – first place	2021 Abu Dhabi	4×50 m medley
Silver medal – second place	2021 Abu Dhabi	4×50 m freestyle
Silver medal – second place	2021 Abu Dhabi	4×200 m freestyle
Silver medal – second place	2021 Abu Dhabi	200 m freestyle
Bronze medal – third place	2021 Abu Dhabi	4×100 m medley
Representing Russia
European Championships (LC)
Gold medal – first place	2020 Budapest	4×100 m freestyle
Gold medal – first place	2020 Budapest	4×200 m freestyle
Silver medal – second place	2020 Budapest	4×100 m medley
Bronze medal – third place	2020 Budapest	4×200 m mixed freestyle
World Junior Championships
Gold medal – first place	2019 Budapest	4×100 m medley
Silver medal – second place	2019 Budapest	4×100 m freestyle
Silver medal – second place	2019 Budapest	4×200 m freestyle
Silver medal – second place	2019 Budapest	4×100 m mixed freestyle
European Junior Championships
Gold medal – first place	2019 Kazan	4×100 m freestyle
Gold medal – first place	2019 Kazan	4×200 m freestyle
Gold medal – first place	2019 Kazan	4×100 m medley
Silver medal – second place	2019 Kazan	4×100 m mixed freestyle

Aleksandr Romanovich Shchegolev (Russian: Александр Романович Щёголев; born 6 April 2002) is a Russian swimmer. He competed in the 2020 Summer Olympics.
