= Hong Jinquan =

Chinese swimmer (born 2003)

Personal information
- Native name: 洪金权
- Nationality: Chinese
- Born: 23 March 2003 (age 23)

Sport
- Sport: Swimming
Medal record
Men's swimming
Representing China
Asian Games
| Gold medal – first place | 2022 Hangzhou | 4 x 100 m freestyle |
| Silver medal – second place | 2022 Hangzhou | 4 x 200 m freestyle |
Youth Olympic Games
| Gold medal – first place | 2018 Buenos Aires | 4×100 m mixed medley |
| Silver medal – second place | 2018 Buenos Aires | 4×100 m medley |
| Bronze medal – third place | 2018 Buenos Aires | 4×100 m mixed freestyle |

Hong Jinquan (Chinese: 洪金权; born 23 March 2003) is a Chinese swimmer. He competed in the men's 4 × 200 metre freestyle relay at the 2020 Summer Olympics.

== Personal bests ==
As of 4 May 2023

=== Long course (50-meter pool) ===
| Event | Time | Meet | Date | Note(s) |
|---|---|---|---|---|
| 50 m freestyle | 22.81 | 2023 Chinese Spring National Swimming Championships | 20 March 2023 | |
| 100 m freestyle | 48.86 | 2023 Chinese Spring National Swimming Championships | 19 March 2023 | |
| 200 m freestyle | 1:46.67 | 2023 Chinese National Swimming Championships | 4 May 2023 | |
| 400 m freestyle | 3:52.60 | 2020 Chinese National Swimming Championships | 27 September 2020 | |
| 50 m backstroke | 27.70 | 2019 FINA World Junior Swimming Championships | 28 August 2019 | |
| 100 m backstroke | 57.85 | 2019 FINA World Junior Swimming Championships | 28 August 2019 | |
| 50 m butterfly | 24.40 | 2023 Chinese Spring National Championships | 22 March 2023 | |
| 100 m butterfly | 52.37 | 2021 Chinese National Swimming Championships | 7 May 2021 | |
| 200 m butterfly | 2:02.67 | 2021 Chinese National Summer Swimming Championships | 2 June 2021 | |

=== Short course (25-meter pool) ===
| Event | Time | Meet | Date | Note(s) |
|---|---|---|---|---|
| 50 m freestyle | 24.04 | 2021 World Championships | 19 December 2021 | |
| 100 m freestyle | 50.18 | 2021 World Championships | 19 December 2021 | |
| 200 m freestyle | 1:44.78 | 2021 World Championships | 17 December 2021 | |

Key: NR = National Record; AS = Asian Record
