= Jan Kałusowski =

Polish swimmer (born 2000)

Jan Aleksander Kałusowski
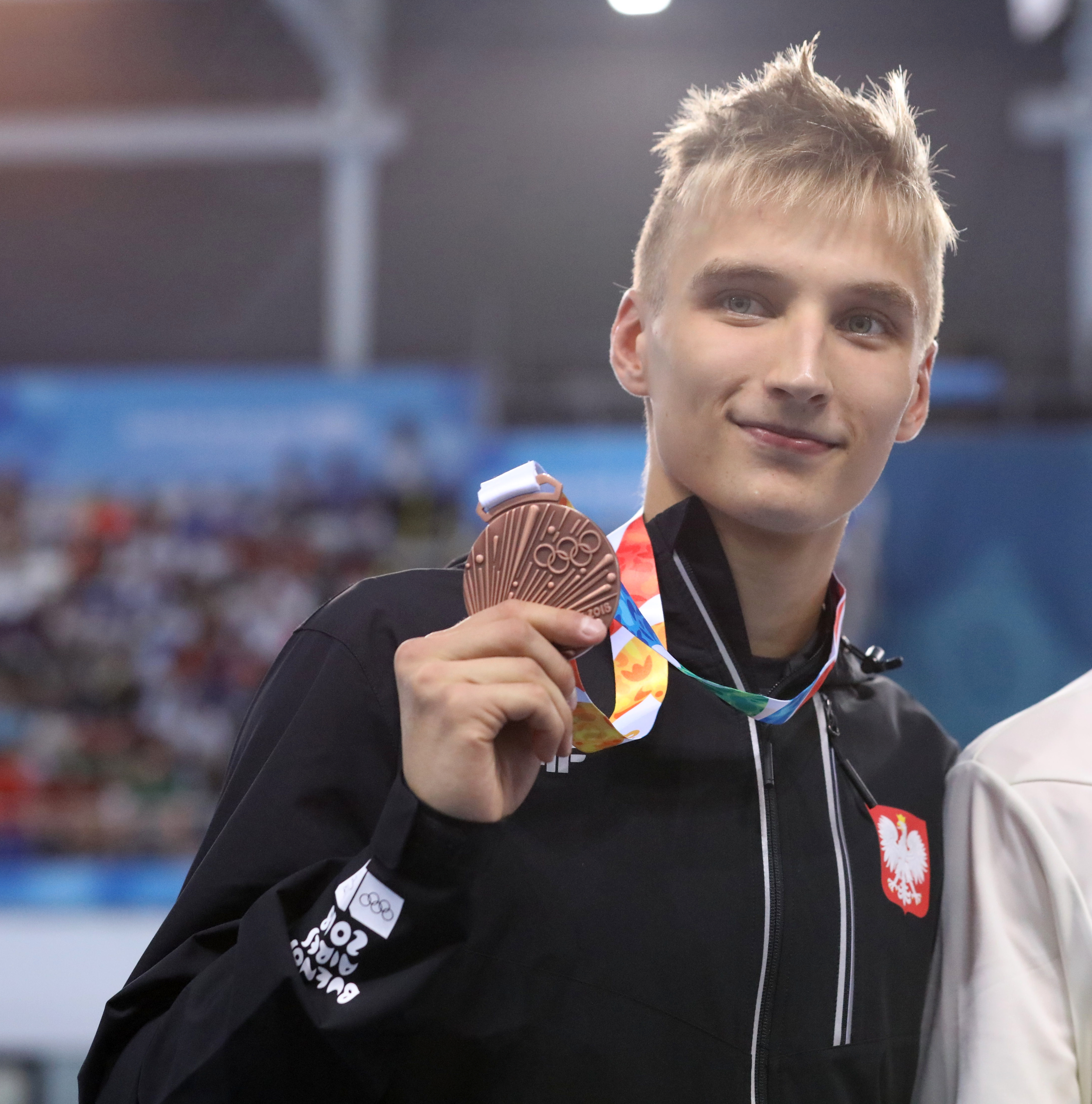

Personal information
- Born: March 12, 2000 (age 26) Łódź, Poland
- Height: 1.82 m (6 ft 0 in)

Sport
- Country: Poland
- Sport: Swimming
- Strokes: Breaststroke
Medal record
Men's swimming
Representing Poland
European Championships (SC)
Bronze medal – third place	2025 Lublin	4×50 m mixed medley
World University Games
Silver medal – second place	2021 Chengdu	100 m breaststroke
Youth Olympic Games
Bronze medal – third place	2018 Buenos Aires	200 m breaststroke
Bronze medal – third place	2018 Buenos Aires	4×100 m medley

Jan Aleksander Kałusowski (born 12 March 2000 in Łódź) is a Polish swimmer specializing in the breaststroke, a medalist at the European Aquatics Championships, and a Polish record holder.

== Career ==
In 2023, at the 2021 Summer Universiade in Chengdu, held in 2023 due to the COVID-19 pandemic, Kałusowski won a silver medal in the 100 m breaststroke, becoming the first Pole to break the one-minute barrier with a time of 59.86.

In February 2024, at the 2024 World Aquatics Championships in Doha, Kałusowski finished 16th in the 50 m breaststroke with a time of 27.38.

Four months later, at the 2024 European Aquatics Championships in Belgrade, he won a silver medal in the 4 × 100 m medley relay with teammates Ksawery Masiuk, Jakub Majerski, and Kamil Sieradzki. In the 200 m breaststroke event, he won a bronze medal with a time of 2:10.20. In the 100 m breaststroke event, he finished fifth, setting a new Polish record with a time of 59.58, which he had also broken in the semifinals the previous day.
