= Olt Kondirolli =

Kosovan swimmer

Personal information
- Nationality: Kosovan
- Born: 14 January 2003 (age 22)

Sport
- Sport: Swimming

Olt Kondirolli (born 14 January 2003) is a Kosovan swimmer. He competed in the men's 100 metre freestyle at the 2020 Summer Olympics.
