= Leonardo Deplano =

Italian swimmer (born 1999)

Personal information
- Born: 21 July 1999 (age 26) Florence, Italy
- Height: 1.93 m (6 ft 4 in)
- Weight: 86 kg (190 lb)

Sport
- Sport: Swimming
- Strokes: Freestyle
Medal record
Men's swimming
Representing Italy
Olympic Games
Bronze medal – third place	2024 Paris	4×100 m freestyle
World Championships (LC)
Silver medal – second place	2023 Fukuoka	4×100 m freestyle
Silver medal – second place	2024 Doha	4×100 m freestyle
Silver medal – second place	2025 Singapore	4×100 m freestyle
World Championships (SC)
Gold medal – first place	2021 Abu Dhabi	4×50 m freestyle
Gold medal – first place	2022 Melbourne	4×100 m freestyle
Gold medal – first place	2022 Melbourne	4×50 m medley
Gold medal – first place	2024 Budapest	4×50 m mixed freestyle
Silver medal – second place	2021 Abu Dhabi	4×100 m freestyle
Silver medal – second place	2022 Melbourne	4×50 m freestyle
Silver medal – second place	2024 Budapest	4×100 m freestyle
Bronze medal – third place	2021 Abu Dhabi	4×50 m mixed medley
European Championships (LC)
Gold medal – first place	2022 Rome	4×100 m freestyle
Silver medal – second place	2022 Rome	4×100 m mixed medley
Silver medal – second place	2022 Rome	50 m freestyle
Bronze medal – third place	2020 Budapest	4×100 m freestyle
European Championships (SC)
Gold medal – first place	2021 Kazan	4×50 m medley
Gold medal – first place	2025 Lublin	4×50 m freestyle
Gold medal – first place	2025 Lublin	4×50 m medley
Gold medal – first place	2025 Lublin	4×50 m mixed freestyle
Silver medal – second place	2021 Kazan	4×50 m mixed freestyle
Bronze medal – third place	2019 Glasgow	4×50 m freestyle
European Junior Championships
Gold medal – first place	2017 Netanya	50 m freestyle

Leonardo Deplano (born 21 July 1999) is an Italian swimmer. He competed in the 2021 FINA World Swimming Championships (25 m), winning gold in the men's 4 × 50 metre freestyle relay event.

At the 2022 European Aquatics Championships, held in Rome in August, Deplano won the silver medal in the 50 metre freestyle with a time of 21.60 seconds, finishing 0.02 seconds behind gold medalist Ben Proud of Great Britain.
