= Sebastien De Meulemeester =

Belgian swimmer

Personal information
- Nationality: Belgian
- Born: 27 February 1998 (age 28)

Sport
- Sport: Swimming

Sebastien De Meulemeester (born 27 February 1998) is a Belgian freestyle swimmer. He competed in the men's 100 metre freestyle event at the 2020 European Aquatics Championships, in Budapest, Hungary.
