= Robin Hanson (swimmer) =

Swedish swimmer

Personal information
- Nationality: Swedish
- Born: 2 April 2001 (age 25) Järfälla, Sweden

Sport
- Sport: Swimming
- Strokes: Freestyle
- Club: Spårvägens SF
- College team: University of California, Berkeley
Medal record
Men's swimming
Representing Sweden
Event	1st	2nd	3rd
Youth Olympic Games	0	1	1
World Junior Championships	0	1	1
European Junior Championships	1	1	2
European Championships (LC)	0	0	1
Total	1	3	5
European Championships (LC)
Bronze medal – third place	2022 Rome	4×100 m mixed freestyle
Youth Olympic Games
Silver medal – second place	2018 Buenos Aires	200 m freestyle
Bronze medal – third place	2018 Buenos Aires	100 m freestyle
World Junior Championships
Silver medal – second place	2019 Budapest	200 m freestyle
Bronze medal – third place	2019 Budapest	100 m freestyle
European Junior Championships
Gold medal – first place	2019 Kazan	200 m freestyle
Silver medal – second place	2019 Kazan	100 m freestyle
Bronze medal – third place	2018 Helsinki	200 m freestyle
Bronze medal – third place	2019 Kazan	400 m freestyle
European Youth Olympic Festival
Gold medal – first place	2017 Győr	200 m freestyle
Silver medal – second place	2017 Győr	100 m freestyle
Bronze medal – third place	2017 Győr	4x100 m freestyle
Bronze medal – third place	2017 Győr	4x100 m mixed freestyle

Robin Hanson (born 2 April 2001) is a Swedish swimmer. He competed in the men's 100 metre freestyle event at the 2020 European Aquatics Championships, in Budapest, Hungary.

At club level, Hanson has represented Järfälla Sim and Spårvägens SF.
