= Stan Pijnenburg =

Dutch swimmer (born 1996)

Personal information
- Nationality: Dutch
- Born: 4 November 1996 (age 29) Haaren, Netherlands

Sport
- Sport: Swimming
- Strokes: Freestyle
Medal record
Men's swimming
Representing Netherlands
World Championships (LC)
| Silver medal – second place | 2024 Doha | 4×100 m medley |
World Championships (SC)
| Silver medal – second place | 2018 Hangzhou | 4×50 m mixed freestyle |
| Bronze medal – third place | 2021 Abu Dhabi | 4×50 m freestyle |
| Bronze medal – third place | 2022 Melbourne | 4×50 m freestyle |
| Bronze medal – third place | 2022 Melbourne | 4×50 m mixed freestyle |
European Championships (LC)
| Silver medal – second place | 2018 Glasgow | 4×100 m mixed freestyle |
| Silver medal – second place | 2020 Budapest | 4×100 m mixed freestyle |
European Championships (SC)
| Gold medal – first place | 2021 Kazan | 4×50 m freestyle |
| Gold medal – first place | 2021 Kazan | 4×50 m mixed freestyle |
| Bronze medal – third place | 2021 Kazan | 200 m freestyle |
| Bronze medal – third place | 2021 Kazan | 4×50 m medley |

Stan Pijnenburg (born 4 November 1996) is a Dutch swimmer.

He competed in the 4 × 100 m mixed freestyle relay event at the 2018 European Aquatics Championships, winning the silver medal.

== Personal bests ==
Short course
| Event | Time | Date | Location |
|---|---|---|---|
| 50 m freestyle | 21.27 | 2021-09-30 | Naples, Italy |
| 100 m freestyle | 46.38NR | 2021-11-06 | Kazan, Russia |
| 200 m freestyle | 1:42.51 | 2021-11-06 | Kazan, Russia |

Long course
| Event | Time | Date | Location |
|---|---|---|---|
| 50 m freestyle | 22.10 | 2021-04-09 | Eindhoven, Netherlands |
| 100 m freestyle | 48.53 | 2021-07-27 | Tokyo, Japan |
| 200 m freestyle | 1:48.06 | 2022-04-08 | Eindhoven, Netherlands |
