= Niksa Stojkovski =

Norwegian swimmer

Personal information
- Nationality: Norwegian
- Born: 5 May 1994 (age 32)

Sport
- Sport: Swimming

Niksa Stojkovski (born 5 May 1994) is a Norwegian swimmer. He competed in the men's 50 metre freestyle event at the 2018 FINA World Swimming Championships (25 m), in Hangzhou, China. In 2019, he represented Norway at the 2019 World Aquatics Championships in Gwangju, South Korea.
