= 2022 FINA World Swimming Championships (25 m) – Men's 4 × 200 metre freestyle relay =

Swimming competition

Men's 4 × 200 metre freestyle relay at the 2022 FINA World Swimming Championships (25 m)
- Venue: Melbourne Sports and Aquatic Centre
- Location: Melbourne, Australia
- Dates: 16 December (heats and finals)
- Competitors: 55 from 12 nations
- Teams: 12
- Winning time: 6:44.12 WR

Medalists
gold medal	Kieran Smith; Carson Foster; Trenton Julian; Drew Kibler; Jake Magahey; Jake Foster	United States
silver medal	Thomas Neill; Kyle Chalmers; Flynn Southam; Mack Horton; Clyde Lewis; Stuart Swinburn; Brendon Smith	Australia
bronze medal	Matteo Ciampi; Thomas Ceccon; Alberto Razzetti; Paolo Conte Bonin; Manuel Frigo	Italy

The Men's 4 × 200 metre freestyle relay competition of the 2022 FINA World Swimming Championships (25 m) was held on 16 December 2022.

== Records ==
Prior to the competition, the existing world and championship records were as follows.

World record	Brazil (BRA)	6:46.81	Hangzhou, China	14 December 2018
Competition record	Brazil (BRA)	6:46.81	Hangzhou, China	14 December 2018

The following new records were set during this competition:

Date	Event	Name	Nation	Time	Record
16 December	Final	Kieran Smith (1:41.04); Carson Foster (1:40.48); Trenton Julian (1:41.44); Drew Kibler (1:41.16)	United States	6:44.12	WR

== Results ==
=== Heats ===
The heats were started at 12:36.

Rank	Heat	Lane	Nation	Swimmers	Time	Notes
1	2	4	United States	Trenton Julian (1:43.13); Jake Magahey (1:43.24); Jake Foster (1:45.29); Drew Kibler (1:41.97)	6:53.63	Q
2	2	6	Japan	Temma Watanabe (1:43.45); Hidenari Mano (1:43.59); Shuya Matsumoto (1:44.59); Katsuhiro Matsumoto (1:42.63)	6:54.26	Q
3	2	5	Italy	Matteo Ciampi (1:43.50); Manuel Frigo (1:44.06); Paolo Conte Bonin (1:43.28); Alberto Razzetti (1:43.70)	6:54.54	Q
4	2	3	Australia	Clyde Lewis (1:44.33); Flynn Southam (1:42.20); Stuart Swinburn (1:44.37); Brendon Smith (1:43.93)	6:54.83	Q
5	1	3	South Korea	Hwang Sun-woo (1:41.97); Kim Woo-min (1:42.95); Lee Ho-joon (1:43.57); Yang Jae-hoon (1:46.75)	6:55.24	Q, NR
6	2	2	Bulgaria	Petar Mitsin (1:43.76); Kaloyan Bratanov (1:43.68); Antani Ivanov (1:43.55); Yordan Yanchev (1:45.43)	6:56.42	Q, NR
7	1	2	Spain	Sergio de Celis (1:45.16); Mario Mollà (1:43.51); Luis Dominguez (1:43.57); Hugo González (1:44.55)	6:56.79	Q
8	1	6	Canada	Ruslan Gaziev (1:44.73); Ilya Kharun (1:45.43); Yuri Kisil (1:46.02); Finlay Knox (1:44.67)	7:00.85	Q
9	1	4	Brazil	Lucas Peixoto (1:45.45); Breno Correia (1:43.52); Leonardo Coelho Santos (1:44.88); Pedro Spajari (1:48.47)	7:02.32	
10	1	7	New Zealand	Ben Littlejohn (1:44.60); Carter Swift (1:45.68); Cameron Gray (1:46.07); Louis Clark (1:46.76)	7:03.11	NR
11	1	5	China	Pan Zhanle (1:44.85); Tao Guannan (1:46.04); Chen Juner (1:45.33); Chen Ende (1:50.04)	7:06.26	
12	2	7	Hong Kong	Cheuk Ming Ho (1:47.15); Hayden Kwan (1:49.02); Adam Chillingworth (1:51.81); Ng Yan Kin (1:53.63)	7:21.61	NR

=== Final ===
The final was held at 21:45.

Rank	Lane	Nation	Swimmers	Time	Notes
1st place, gold medalist(s)	4	United States	Kieran Smith (1:41.04); Carson Foster (1:40.48); Trenton Julian (1:41.44); Drew Kibler (1:41.16)	6:44.12	WR
2nd place, silver medalist(s)	6	Australia	Thomas Neill (1:41.50); Kyle Chalmers (1:40.35); Flynn Southam (1:41.50); Mack Horton (1:43.19)	6:46.54	OC
3rd place, bronze medalist(s)	3	Italy	Matteo Ciampi (1:42.68); Thomas Ceccon (1:42.61); Alberto Razzetti (1:42.76); Paolo Conte Bonin (1:41.58)	6:49.63	NR
4	2	South Korea	Hwang Sun-woo (1:40.99) AS; Kim Woo-min (1:42.03); Lee Ho-joon (1:42.92); Yang Jae-hoon (1:43.73)	6:49.67	NR
5	5	Japan	Temma Watanabe (1:43.78); Katsuhiro Matsumoto (1:40.66); Hidenari Mano (1:43.18); Shuya Matsumoto (1:44.42)	6:52.04	NR
6	1	Spain	Luis Dominguez (1:43.02) NR; Mario Mollà (1:42.69); Hugo González (1:44.30); Sergio de Celis (1:43.12)	6:53.13	NR
7	8	Canada	Finlay Knox (1:43.96); Ruslan Gaziev (1:44.32); Ilya Kharun (1:45.51); Javier Acevedo (1:42.23)	6:56.02	
8	7	Bulgaria	Petar Mitsin (1:44.31); Kaloyan Bratanov (1:43.93); Antani Ivanov (1:44.45); Yordan Yanchev (1:46.43)	6:59.12	
