= 2024 World Aquatics Swimming Championships (25 m) – Men's 4 × 100 metre freestyle relay =

Swimming competition

Men's 4 × 100 metre freestyle relay at the 2024 World Aquatics Swimming Championships (25 m)
- Venue: Duna Arena
- Location: Budapest, Hungary
- Dates: 10 December (heats and final)
- Competitors: 79 from 19 nations
- Teams: 19
- Winning time: 3:01.66 WR

Medalists
gold medal	Jack Alexy; Luke Hobson; Kieran Smith; Chris Guiliano; Trenton Julian	United States
silver medal	Alessandro Miressi; Leonardo Deplano; Lorenzo Zazzeri; Manuel Frigo	Italy
bronze medal	Kamil Sieradzki; Jakub Majerski; Ksawery Masiuk; Kacper Stokowski; Piotr Ludwiczak	Poland

The men's 4 × 100 metre freestyle relay event at the 2024 World Aquatics Swimming Championships (25 m) was held on 10 December 2024 at the Duna Arena in Budapest, Hungary.

== Records ==
Prior to the competition, the existing world and championship records were as follows.

World record	Italy (ITA)	3:02.75	Melbourne, Australia	13 December 2022
Competition record	Italy (ITA)	3:02.75	Melbourne, Australia	13 December 2022

The following new records were set during this competition:

Date	Event	Name	Nation	Time	Record
10 December	Final	Jack Alexy (45.05); Luke Hobson (45.18); Kieran Smith (46.01); Chris Guiliano (45.42)	United States	3:01.66	WR

== Results ==
=== Heats ===
The heats were started at 11:35.

Rank	Heat	Lane	Nation	Swimmers	Time	Notes
1	2	4	United States	Trenton Julian (47.80); Luke Hobson (45.39); Kieran Smith (46.43); Jack Alexy (45.58)	3:05.20	Q
2	2	5	Italy	Alessandro Miressi (46.32); Lorenzo Zazzeri (46.77); Leonardo Deplano (46.01); Manuel Frigo (46.30)	3:05.40	Q
3	1	2	Brazil	Kaique Alves (46.69); Guilherme Caribé (46.00); Marco Antonio Ferreira (46.31); Leonardo Coelho Santos (47.77)	3:06.77	Q
4	2	2	Poland	Piotr Ludwiczak (47.51); Jakub Majerski (46.92); Ksawery Masiuk (46.22); Kamil Sieradzki (46.23)	3:06.88	Q, NR
5	1	4	Australia	Edward Sommerville (47.90); Maximillian Giuliani (46.26); Harrison Turner (46.45); Matthew Temple (46.41)	3:07.02	Q
6	2	9	Neutral Athletes B	Andrei Minakov (47.18); Aleksandr Shchegolev (46.53); Dmitrii Zhavoronkov (46.24); Pavel Samusenko (47.09)	3:07.04	Q
7	2	7	Croatia	Jere Hribar (46.22); Nikola Miljenić (46.67); Vlaho Nenadić (47.53); Toni Dragoja (46.65)	3:07.07	Q, NR
8	1	6	Spain	Sergio de Celis (47.18); Luis Domínguez (46.32); Miguel Pérez-Godoy (46.63); Nacho Campos (46.96)	3:07.09	Q, NR
9	1	3	Germany	Martin Wrede (47.59); Rafael Miroslaw (46.24); Kaii Winkler (46.24); Timo Sorgius (47.33)	3:07.40	
10	1	5	China	Zhao Jiayue (48.95); Liu Wudi (47.07); Tao Guannan (46.71); Xu Yizhou (47.08)	3:09.81	
11	1	7	Japan	Tatsuya Murasa (47.07); Kaiya Seki (47.12); Masahiro Kawane (47.47); Kaito Tabuchi (48.37)	3:10.03	
12	2	3	Canada	Yuri Kisil (47.67); Tristan Jankovics (47.74); Blake Tierney (47.32); Alex Axon (47.97)	3:10.70	
13	2	6	Hungary	Richárd Márton (47.68); Dániel Mészáros (48.35); Boldizsár Magda (47.41); Benedek Andor (47.64)	3:11.08	
14	1	0	Kazakhstan	Adilbek Mussin (48.48); Yegor Popov (49.18); Maxim Skazobtsov (50.13); Gleb Kovalenya (48.18)	3:15.97	NR
15	2	0	Slovakia	Tibor Tišťan (49.05); Matej Duša (48.15); Ádám Halás (49.92); Jakub Poliačik (49.39)	3:16.51	NR
16	2	1	Hong Kong	Ralph Koo (49.44); Ian Ho (48.76); He Shing Ip (50.14); Hayden Kwan (48.58)	3:16.92	
17	2	8	South Africa	Ruard van Renen (47.70); Michael Houlie (48.96); Arno Kruger (48.48); Kian Keylock (52.05)	3:17.19	
18	1	1	Malaysia	Khiew Hoe Yean (49.20); Lim Yin Chuen (48.07); Terence Ng (48.98); Tan Khai Xin (50.98)	3:17.23	
19	1	8	Latvia	Kristaps Miķelsons (49.58); Nikolass Deičmans (49.94); Daniils Bobrovs (53.10); Ģirts Feldbergs (49.52)	3:22.14	NR

=== Final ===
The final was held at 19:27.

Rank	Lane	Nation	Swimmers	Time	Notes
1st place, gold medalist(s)	4	United States	Jack Alexy (45.05) CR, AM; Luke Hobson (45.18); Kieran Smith (46.01); Chris Guiliano (45.42)	3:01.66	WR
2nd place, silver medalist(s)	5	Italy	Alessandro Miressi (45.95); Leonardo Deplano (45.76); Lorenzo Zazzeri (46.21); Manuel Frigo (45.73)	3:03.65	
3rd place, bronze medalist(s)	6	Poland	Kamil Sieradzki (46.33); Jakub Majerski (46.04); Ksawery Masiuk (45.64); Kacper Stokowski (46.45)	3:04.46	NR
4	7	Neutral Athletes B	Egor Kornev (45.94); Dmitrii Zhavoronkov (46.22); Aleksandr Shchegolev (46.65); Andrei Minakov (45.81)	3:04.62	
5	3	Brazil	Marco Antonio Ferreira (46.44); Guilherme Caribé (45.79); Kaique Alves (45.82); Leonardo Coelho Santos (46.79)	3:04.84	SA
6	8	Spain	Sergio de Celis (46.48) NR; Luis Domínguez (46.40); Miguel Pérez-Godoy (46.13); Nacho Campos (46.56)	3:05.57	NR
7	1	Croatia	Jere Hribar (46.16); Nikola Miljenić (46.24); Vlaho Nenadić (46.70); Toni Dragoja (46.58)	3:05.68	NR
8	2	Australia	Maximillian Giuliani (46.62); Edward Sommerville (47.34); Harrison Turner (46.20); Matthew Temple (45.60)	3:05.76	
