= Fernando Scheffer =

Brazilian swimmer (born 1998)

Personal information
- Full name: Fernando Muhlenberg Scheffer
- Nickname: Monet
- Nationality: Brazil
- Born: 6 April 1998 (age 28) Canoas, Rio Grande do Sul, Brazil
- Height: 1.89 m (6 ft 2 in)
- Weight: 79 kg (174 lb)

Sport
- Sport: Swimming
- Strokes: Freestyle
- Club: Minas Tênis Clube
Medal record
Men's swimming
Representing Brazil
Olympic Games
Bronze medal – third place	2020 Tokyo	200 m freestyle
World Championships (SC)
Gold medal – first place	2018 Hangzhou	4×200 m freestyle
Bronze medal – third place	2021 Abu Dhabi	4×200 m freestyle
Pan American Games
Gold medal – first place	2019 Lima	200 m freestyle
Gold medal – first place	2019 Lima	4×200 m freestyle
Gold medal – first place	2023 Santiago	4×200 m freestyle
Silver medal – second place	2019 Lima	400 m freestyle
South American Games
Gold medal – first place	2018 Cochabamba	200 m freestyle
Gold medal – first place	2018 Cochabamba	4×200 m freestyle
Silver medal – second place	2018 Cochabamba	4×100 m freestyle
Military World Games
Gold medal – first place	2019 Wuhan	4×100 m freestyle
Silver medal – second place	2019 Wuhan	200 m freestyle
Silver medal – second place	2019 Wuhan	4×200 m freestyle

Fernando Muhlenberg Scheffer (born 6 April 1998) is a Brazilian swimmer. In the 200 metre freestyle, he is the bronze medalist of the Tokyo 2020 Olympics, the gold medalist at the 2019 Pan American Games and the South American record holder in the event. He became the world champion and world record holder in the 4x200m freestyle relay at the 2018 World Swimming Championships in short course.

== Early life ==
Scheffer began to gain prominence in the Grêmio Náutico União, and in 2018 he moved to Minas Tênis Clube. His nickname is Monet, due to confusion about a work of art.

== International career ==
=== 2016–20 ===
At the 2016 FINA World Swimming Championships (25 m) in Windsor, Ontario, Canada, Scheffer finished 25th in the Men's 200 metre freestyle, 33rd in the Men's 400 metre freestyle and 40th in the Men's 100 metre freestyle.

On 27 April 2018, participating in the Maria Lenk Trophy competition (long course) in Rio de Janeiro, Scheffer broke the South American record in the 200-metre freestyle race in 1:46.08 seconds. Three days later, he broke the South American record in the 400-metre freestyle race in 3:49.06 seconds.

At the 2018 South American Games in Cochabamba, he won two gold medals in the 200m and 4 × 200 m freestyle and a silver medal at the 4 × 100 m freestyle.

At the 2018 Pan Pacific Swimming Championships in Tokyo, Japan, Scheffer made his first major involvement in an international tournament, finishing 4th in the Men's 200 metre freestyle, 4th in the Men's 4 × 200 metre freestyle relay and 6th in the Men's 400 metre freestyle.

On 25 August 2018, participating in the José Finkel Trophy competition (short course) in São Paulo, Scheffer broke the South American record in the 400-metre freestyle race in 3:40.87 seconds.

At the 2018 FINA World Swimming Championships (25 m) in Hangzhou, China, Fernando Scheffer, along with Luiz Altamir Melo, Leonardo Coelho Santos and Breno Correia, surprised the world by winning the gold medal in the Men's 4 × 200 metre freestyle relay, breaking the world record, with a time of 6:46.81. The relay was composed only of young people between 19 and 23 years and was not favorite to gold. In the Men's 400 metre freestyle, he broke the South American record at heats, with a time of 3:39.10. He finished 8th in the final.

On 21 December 2018, at the Porto Alegre Open in Brazil, he broke the long-course South American record in the 200-metre freestyle with a time of 1:45.51. It was the fourth fastest time in the world in 2018. He broke five South American records in 2018.

At the 2019 World Aquatics Championships in Gwangju, South Korea, Brazil's young 4 × 200 metre freestyle relay team, now with João de Lucca instead of Leonardo Coelho Santos, lowered the South American record in almost 3 seconds, with a time of 7:07.12, at heats. They finished 7th, with a time of 7:07.64 in the final. It was the first time that Brazil's 4x200m freestyle relay had qualified for a World Championships final. The result qualified Brazil for the Tokyo 2020 Olympics. In the Men's 200 metre freestyle, he was very close to qualify for the final, finishing 9th, just eight milliseconds from 8th place. He swam near his South American record, finishing 1:45.83 in the semifinals.

At the 2019 Pan American Games held in Lima, Peru, Scheffer won two gold medals in the Men's 200 metre freestyle and in the Men's 4 × 200 metre freestyle relay, breaking the Pan American Games record in the relay. He also won the silver medal in the Men's 400 metre freestyle.

=== 2020 Summer Olympics ===
At the 2020 Summer Olympics in Tokyo, Scheffer broke the South American record in the Men's 200 metre freestyle heats, with a time of 1:45.05, ranking 2nd for the semifinal. After qualifying with the last place in the semifinals, Scheffer outperformed himself again in the final, beating his South American record again by a wide margin, with a time of 1:44.66, obtaining the bronze medal, repeating the feat of Gustavo Borges, the last Brazilian to obtain an Olympic medal in this event. Scheffer lowered the South American record by almost 1 second at the Olympics to win the medal.

=== 2021–24 ===
At the 2021 FINA World Swimming Championships (25 m) in Abu Dhabi, United Arab Emirates, in the Men's 4 × 200 metre freestyle relay, the Brazilian relay, composed by Scheffer, Murilo Sartori, Kaique Alves and Breno Correia, again obtained a medal, now bronze, maintaining the good performance of 2018, when Brazil won the gold beating the world record. He also finished 7th in the Men's 200 metre freestyle.

At the 2022 World Aquatics Championships held in Budapest, Hungary, he did not have a good run in the Men's 200 metre freestyle, finishing in 9th place with a time of 1:46.11. He recovered in the Men's 4 × 200 metre freestyle relay event, composed by Scheffer, Vinicius Assunção, Murilo Sartori and Breno Correia, where the Brazilian team beat the South American record twice in a row, in the heats, and the finals, reaching a time of 7:04.69 and obtaining an unprecedented fourth place in the long-distance World Championships. The Brazilian team just didn't get a medal because of the exceptional performance of Tom Dean when closing the British relay.

On 16 September 2022, at the José Finkel Trophy in Recife, he broke the short course South American record in the 200-metre freestyle, with a time of 1:41.32.

He did not attend the 2022 FINA World Swimming Championships (25 m) in Melbourne, Australia. Despite having an index for the competition, he opted to ask for a waiver to focus on next year's competitions.
