= Thomas Neill (swimmer) =

Australian swimmer

Personal information
- Nationality: Australian
- Born: 9 June 2002 (age 24) Hong Kong
- Height: 1.90 m (6 ft 3 in)

Sport
- Sport: Swimming
- Strokes: Freestyle
Medal record
Representing Australia
Men's swimming
Olympic Games
Bronze medal – third place	2020 Tokyo	4×200 m freestyle
Bronze medal – third place	2024 Paris	4×200 m freestyle
World Championships
Bronze medal – third place	2023 Fukuoka	4×200 m freestyle
World Championships (SC)
Silver medal – second place	2022 Melbourne	400 m freestyle
Silver medal – second place	2022 Melbourne	4×100 m freestyle
Silver medal – second place	2022 Melbourne	4×200 m freestyle
World Junior Championships
Silver medal – second place	2019 Budapest	400 m freestyle
Silver medal – second place	2019 Budapest	1500 m freestyle
Bronze medal – third place	2019 Budapest	800 m freestyle
Bronze medal – third place	2019 Budapest	4×200 m freestyle
Junior Pan Pacific Championships
Bronze medal – third place	2018 Suva	4×200 m freestyle

Thomas Neill (born 9 June 2002) is an Australian swimmer. He competed in the men's 200 metre freestyle at the 2020 Summer Olympics.
