= Trenton Julian =

American swimmer (born 1998)

Personal information
- Full name: Trenton Jeffrey Julian
- National team: United States
- Born: December 9, 1998 (age 27) Los Angeles, California, U.S.
- Height: 6 ft 0 in (183 cm)
- Weight: 165 lb (75 kg)

Sport
- Sport: Swimming
- Strokes: Butterfly, freestyle, individual medley
- Club: Mission Viejo Nadadores
- College team: University of California, Berkeley (former)
- Coach: Jeff Julian
Medal record
Men's swimming
Representing United States
Event	1st	2nd	3rd
World Championships (LC)	1	1	0
World Championships (SC)	6	2	1
World University Games	1	0	0
Total	8	3	1
World Championships (LC)
Gold medal – first place	2022 Budapest	4×200 m freestyle
Silver medal – second place	2022 Budapest	4×100 m medley
World Championships (SC)
Gold medal – first place	2021 Abu Dhabi	4×200 m freestyle
Gold medal – first place	2021 Abu Dhabi	4×50 m medley
Gold medal – first place	2022 Melbourne	4×200 m freestyle
Gold medal – first place	2022 Melbourne	4×100 m medley
Gold medal – first place	2024 Budapest	4×100 m freestyle
Gold medal – first place	2024 Budapest	4×200 m freestyle
Silver medal – second place	2021 Abu Dhabi	4×100 m medley
Silver medal – second place	2022 Melbourne	4×50 m medley
Bronze medal – third place	2022 Melbourne	4×100 m freestyle
World University Games
Gold medal – first place	2019 Naples	4×200 m freestyle

Trenton Jeffrey Julian (born December 9, 1998) is an American competitive swimmer. He is a world record holder in the short course 4×200 meter freestyle relay and 4×100 meter medley relay. He won a gold medal in the 4×200 meter freestyle relay at the 2019 World University Games. He followed up with gold medals in the 4×200 meter freestyle relay at the 2021 World Short Course Championships, 2022 World Aquatic Championships, and 2022 World Short Course Championships. In the 4×100 meter medley relay, he won a world title and gold medal at the 2022 World Short Course Championships, swimming butterfly on each the prelims and finals relay.

== Background ==
Julian was born December 9, 1998, in Los Angeles, California. He is the son of Jeff Julian, who was a U.S. National Team member, and Kristine Quance, a gold medalist in swimming at the 1996 Summer Olympics. Julian started swimming when he was about 5 years old.

Julian graduated from Glendale High School and started attending the University of California, Berkeley in 2017, where he competed collegiately as part of the California Golden Bears swim team thru the 2021–2022 season. He is coached by his father, Jeff Julian.

== Career ==
=== 2016–19 ===
==== 2016 US Olympic Trials ====
At the 2016 US Olympic Trials, Julian became the first swimmer to compete in a swimming US Olympic Trials from Glendale, California since 2000, when Sam Greenwood competed. Julian placed 71st in the prelims heats of the 200 meter butterfly with a time of 2:04.16.

==== 2019 World University Games ====
2019 World University Games
Gold medal – first place	4×200 m freestyle	7:09.77

In July 2019 at the 2019 World University Games in Naples, Italy, Julian won a gold medal in the 4×200 meter freestyle relay in 7:09.77 with finals relay teammates Dean Farris, Grant House, and Zach Apple, splitting a 1:46.99 for the third leg of the finals relay after helping qualify the relay to the final ranking first in the prelims heats. For the 200 meter butterfly, Julian placed 13th in the semifinals with a time of 1:59.05.

=== 2021 ===
==== 2021 NCAA Championships ====
Leading up to the 2021 NCAA Championships, Julian swam a 1:38.53 in the 200 yard butterfly at the 2021 Pac-12 Conference Championships to become the third fastest swimmer in the event in the history of the NCAA, ranking after Jack Conger and Joseph Schooling. At the 2021 NCAA Championships, Julian placed third in the 200 yard freestyle with a 1:31.55, finishing behind Kieran Smith and Drew Kibler. He also placed second in both the 200 yard butterfly, with a time of 1:38.85 behind Nicolas Albiero, and the 4×200 yard freestyle relay, contributing a split of 1:31.41 to the final time of 6:08.68 on the lead-off leg of the relay. In the 500 yard freestyle, Julian placed fourth in a time of 4:09.78.

==== 2020 US Olympic Trials ====
At the 2020 US Olympic Trials in Omaha, Nebraska and held in 2021 due to the COVID-19 pandemic, Julian did not start the 400 meter freestyle on the first day of competition in the prelims heats. The next day, he swam a 1:47.63 in the prelims heats of the 200 meter freestyle and qualified for the semifinals in the evening ranking 12th. In the semifinals he placed 13th in 1:47.50 and did not qualify for the final. On the third day of competition, Julian ranked third in the prelims heats of the 200 meter butterfly with a time of 1:56.42, advancing to the semifinals. For the semifinals Julian swam a 1:55.35 and qualified for the final ranking third behind Luca Urlando and Zach Harting who tied for first rank with a time of 1:55.21. In the final the following day, Julian placed fifth with a time of 1:56.35.

On day five Julian ranked 13th in the prelims heats of the 200 meter individual medley with a 2:00.73, qualifying for the semifinals. In the evening semifinals, Julian qualified for the final with a time of 1:59.21 and overall rank of eighth. The next day Julian started competition in the morning, tying for second-rank overall in the prelims heats of the 100 meter butterfly behind Caeleb Dressel with a time of 51.71 seconds. In the evening, Julian started off in the final of the 200 meter individual medley, finishing in 2:04.49 to place eighth. For his second and final event of the session, Julian swam a 51.70 in the semifinals of the 100 meter butterfly to qualify for the final ranking fifth. Day seven, Julian concluded competition with the final of the 100 meter butterfly where he tied Coleman Stewart for fourth place with a time of 51.78 seconds.

==== 2021 Speedo Summer Championships ====
Following the 2020 US Olympic Trials, Julian lowered his personal best time in the 200 meter butterfly with a time of 1:54.71 at the 2021 Speedo Summer Championships in Irvine, California on August 3, which moved him up in rankings to the ninth fastest American in the history of the event, the seventh fastest swimmer in the event in for the year globally, and the fastest American for 2021. Later in the championships, Julian swam a personal best time in the 200 meter individual medley with a 1:57.86, which made him the fifth fastest American in the event for 2021 behind Michael Andrew, Chase Kalisz, Carson Foster, and Kieran Smith.

==== 2021 World Short Course Championships ====
2021 World Championships (SC)
Gold medal – first place	4×200 m freestyle	6:47.00 (NR)
Gold medal – first place	4×50 m medley	1:30.51 (h)
Silver medal – second place	4×100 m medley	3:20.50

On the first day of competition at the 2021 World Short Course Championships in Abu Dhabi, United Arab Emirates, Julian ranked first in the prelims heats of the 200 meter butterfly with a time 1:50.32, splitting a personal best time of 51.94 seconds for the first 100 meters en route to the 200 meter time. In the final of the 200 meter butterfly, Julian finished less than two tenths of a second behind bronze medalist Chad le Clos of South Africa with a time of 1:50.01 to place fourth. Day four of competition, Julian led-off the 4×200 meter freestyle relay in the prelims heats with a 1:43.33, helping qualify the relay to the final ranking seventh. In the final of the 4×200 meter freestyle relay later the same day, Julian split a 1:41.35 for the second leg of the relay to contribute to the gold medal-winning and American record time of 6:47.00 achieved with his finals relay teammates Kieran Smith, Carson Foster, and Ryan Held.

In the prelims session on the morning of the fifth day, Julian helped qualify the 4×50 meter medley relay to the final ranking fourth in 1:33.29 with a split of 22.57 seconds for the butterfly leg of the relay. For the finals relay in the evening, Julian was substituted out for Tom Shields and the relay placed first in 1:30.51 with Julian winning a gold medal for his contributions. On the sixth and final day of competition, Julian split a 49.25 for the butterfly leg of the 4×100 meter medley relay in the prelims heats, helping achieve a ranking of third heading in to the final. In the final Julian swam a 49.36 for the butterfly portion of the relay, helping win the silver medal in 3:20.50 with finals relay teammates Shaine Casas (backstroke), Nic Fink (breaststroke), and Ryan Held (freestyle).

=== 2022 ===
==== 2022 Pac-12 Conference Championships ====
On the first day of the 2022 Pac-12 Conference Championships, held in Federal Way, Washington in early March at the King County Aquatic Center, Julian helped achieve a third-place finish in the 4×200 yard freestyle relay in 6:09.98, splitting a 1:31.48 for the third leg of the relay. The morning of day two, he ranked ninth in the prelims heats of the 500 yard freestyle with a 4:15.84. In the b-final in the evening of the same day, he placed second with a time of 4:14.10. On day three, he qualified for the final of the 200 yard freestyle ranking third with a 1:33.29 in the morning prelims heats. He placed third in the final, lowering his time to a 1:32.54. In the prelims heats of the 200 yard butterfly on the fourth and final day, he ranked first and qualified for the final with a 1:41.22. He followed up with a 1:39.95 in the final to win by 0.33 seconds.

==== 2022 NCAA Championships ====
2022 NCAA Championships
Gold medal – first place	4×100 yd medley	3:00.36
Bronze medal – third place	4×50 yd medley	1:21.69

On the first day of the 2022 NCAA Championships, Julian helped achieve a third-place finish in the 4×50 yard medley relay in 1:21.69, swimming the butterfly leg of the relay in 20.12 seconds, and a fourth-place finish in the 4×200 yard freestyle relay in 6:06.90, splitting a 1:31.57 for the lead-off leg of the relay. Following up his relay swim with an individual event the next morning, he qualified for the final of the 200 yard individual medley ranking fourth with a time of 1:40.35 in the prelims heats. He finished in seventh-place in the final with a time of 1:40.47. He swam a 1:31.71 in the prelims heats of the 200 yard freestyle on day three and qualified for the evening final ranking fourth. He touched the wall seventh in the final with a 1:31.80, finishing 0.35 seconds behind sixth-place finisher Brooks Curry. Later in the session, he helped achieve a first-place victory in the 4×100 yard medley relay in a new pool record time of 3:00.36, splitting a 44.44 for the butterfly leg of the relay. The following morning, he ranked third in the prelims heats of the 200 yard butterfly, qualifying for the final with his time of 1:39.87. He lowered his time to a 1:39.00 in the final to place fourth.

==== 2022 International Team Trials ====
On the morning of the first day of the 2022 US International Team Trials in Greensboro, North Carolina, Julian swam a personal best time of 1:54.34 in the prelims heats of the 200 meter butterfly to qualify for the final ranking first. He finished second in the final behind Luca Urlando with a time of 1:54.22, further lowering his personal best. The following morning, he ranked third in the prelims heats of the 200 meter freestyle with a personal best time of 1:46.76 and qualified for the evening final. For the final, he lowered his personal best time to a 1:46.69 to place fourth. Swimming a personal best time of 51.11 seconds in the prelims heats of the 100 meter butterfly on day three, he qualified for the final ranking second. He dropped one-hundredth of a second from his personal best time in the final, finishing third in 51.10 seconds. Day five of five, he ranked second in the prelims heats of the 200 meter individual medley with a 1:58.30, which was less than two-tenths of a second behind first-ranked Chase Kalisz. He tied for fourth in the final with a time of 1:58.42. His performances qualified him for the 2022 World Aquatics Championships, his first long course World Championships, in the 200 meter butterfly and the 4×200 meter freestyle relay.

==== 2022 World Aquatics Championships ====
2022 World Championships (LC)
Gold medal – first place	4×200 m freestyle	7:00.24
Silver medal – second place	4×100 m medley	3:27.79 (h)

On May 18, 2022, James Sutherland of SwimSwam reported that on May 17, 2022, Julian was added to the United States Center for SafeSport database after being accused of misconduct with restrictions listed as coaching/training and electronic device restrictions, he was not allowed to train unsupervised, and the restrictions would not hinder Julian's performances at the 2022 World Aquatics Championships. The third day of pool swimming competition at the Championships, June 20, Julian ranked fourth in the preliminaries of the 200 meter butterfly with a time of 1:55.04, qualifying for the evening semifinals. In the semifinals, he swam a 1:56.45, placing sixteenth and not qualifying for the final. Three days later, he anchored the 4×200 metre freestyle relay in the prelims with a time of 1:45.63, helping qualify the relay to the final ranking first. In the final, he helped achieve a time of 7:00.24 and win the gold medal, swimming the third leg of the relay in 1:45.31. On day eight of eight, he helped qualify the 4×100 meter medley relay to the final ranking first, splitting a 51.35 for the butterfly leg of the relay in the preliminaries. On the finals relay, Michael Andrew substituted in for him and split 50.06, and both won a silver medal when the finals relay finished second in 3:27.79. The following month, Julian was named to the USA Swimming team roster for the 2022 Duel in the Pool, held competing against Australia in August.

==== 2022 Australian Short Course Championships ====
At the 2022 Australian Short Course Swimming Championships, held in August in Sydney, Australia, Julian placed sixth in the 200 meter freestyle, finishing 2.17 seconds behind gold medalist Kyle Chalmers of Australia with a personal best time of 1:43.24. The following day, he won the gold medal in the 200 meter butterfly with a Championships record and Australian All Comers record time of 1:50.71. Over the remaining days of competition, he won the silver medal in the 100 meter butterfly with a 50.22, finishing 0.13 seconds behind gold medalist Matthew Temple of Australia, the bronze medal in the 100 meter individual medley with a personal best time of 52.76 seconds, and placed fifth in the 200 meter individual medley with a 1:54.11.

==== 2022 Swimming World Cup ====
Julian improved upon his personal best time in the 100 meter individual medley at the 2022 FINA Swimming World Cup stop in late October in Toronto, Canada, his first FINA Swimming World Cup, lowering the mark to a 52.61 in the preliminary heats of the event to qualify for the evening final ranking first. In the evening finals session, he first won the bronze medal in the 100 meter butterfly with a personal best time of 49.75 seconds, then placed sixth in the 100 meter individual medley with a personal best time of 52.21 seconds. On the second day, he won the bronze medal in the 200 meter individual medley with a personal best time of 1:52.81. Later in the same session he won the gold medal in the 200 meter butterfly with a personal best time of 1:49.69, which was 0.09 seconds faster than silver medalist Chad le Clos. Day three of three, he won the silver medal in the 200 meter freestyle with a personal best time of 1:42.35, finishing 0.03 seconds behind gold medalist and fellow American Brooks Curry. In the 200 meter butterfly at the next, and final, World Cup stop, held in Indianapolis in November, Julian and Chad le Clos switched places on the podium, with Julian winning the silver medal in a time of 1:50.08.

==== 2022 World Short Course Championships ====
2022 World Championships (SC)
Gold medal – first place	4×200 m freestyle	6:44.12 (WR)
Gold medal – first place	4×100 m medley	3:18.98 (WR)
Silver medal – second place	4×50 m medley	1:30.37 (h)
Bronze medal – third place	4×100 m freestyle	3:05.09 (h)

In December, and less than two weeks before the start of the 2022 World Short Course Championships, held at Melbourne Sports and Aquatic Centre in Melbourne, Australia, Julian was added to the USA Swimming roster in the 200 meter butterfly in the place of Luca Urlando who was removed from the roster in the spot on the original roster announced in October. With a time of 46.77 for the third leg of the 4×100 meter freestyle relay in the day one morning preliminaries, he helped qualify the relay to the final with a third-ranked time of 3:06.83. On the finals relay, Carson Foster took his place and with a third-place finish by the finals relay in 3:05.09 he won a bronze medal for his contribution in the preliminaries.

Day three of six, Julian started off with a new Australian All Comers record of 1:49.93 in the preliminaries of the 200 meter butterfly and qualified for the final ranking first. In the final he placed seventh, finishing in a time of 1:50.94. The next morning, he led-off the 4×200 meter freestyle relay with a 1:43.13 to contribute to a final-qualifying and first-ranked preliminaries time of 6:53.63. In the final, he and finals relay teammates Kieran Smith, Carson Foster, and Drew Kibler all split faster than 1:41.50 to achieve a world record time of 6:44.12 and win the gold medal. On the fifth morning, he split a 22.39 for the 50 meter butterfly portion of the 4×50 meter medley relay to contribute to the prelims relay time of 1:32.67, which qualified the relay for the final ranking fifth. For the butterfly leg of the relay in the final, Shaine Casas took his place and he won a silver medal for his contribution when the relay placed second in 1:30.37. For his final event, the 4×100 meter medley relay on day six of six, he split a 49.12 for the butterfly leg in the preliminaries, contributing to a first-ranked final-qualifying time of 3:23.65. In the evening final, he became a world record holder in a second event, the 4×100 meter medley relay, swimming the butterfly leg of the relay in 49.19 seconds to help achieve a time of 3:18.98, which tied the relay team from Australia for the new world record and gold medal.

== International championships (50 m) ==
Meet	200 butterfly	4×200 freestyle	4×100 medley
WUG 2019	13th	1st place, gold medalist(s)	
WC 2022	16th	1st place, gold medalist(s)	(silver) ^{[a]}

^{a} Julian swam only in the preliminary heats.

== International championships (25 m) ==
Meet	200 butterfly	4×100 freestyle	4×200 freestyle	4×50 medley	4×100 medley
WC 2021	4th		1st place, gold medalist(s)	(gold) ^{[a]}	2nd place, silver medalist(s)
WC 2022	7th	(bronze) ^{[a]}	1st place, gold medalist(s)	(silver) ^{[a]}	1st place, gold medalist(s)

^{a} Julian swam only in the preliminary heats.

== Personal best times ==
=== Long course meters (50 m pool) ===
Event	Time	Meet	Location	Date	Ref
200 m freestyle	1:46.69	2022 US International Team Trials	Greensboro, North Carolina	April 27, 2022	
400 m freestyle	3:49.47	2019 US National Championships	Stanford, California	August 3, 2019	
100 m butterfly	51.10	2022 US International Team Trials	Greensboro, North Carolina	April 28, 2022	
200 m butterfly	1:54.22	2022 US International Team Trials	Greensboro, North Carolina	April 26, 2022	
200 m individual medley	1:57.86	2021 Speedo Summer Championships	Irvine, California	August 7, 2021	

=== Short course meters (25 m pool) ===
Event	Time	Meet	Location	Date	Ref
200 m freestyle	1:42.35	2022 Swimming World Cup	Toronto, Canada	October 30, 2022	
100 m butterfly	49.75	2022 Swimming World Cup	Toronto, Canada	October 28, 2022	
200 m butterfly	1:49.69	2022 Swimming World Cup	Toronto, Canada	October 29, 2022	
100 m individual medley	52.21	2022 Swimming World Cup	Toronto, Canada	October 28, 2022	
200 m individual medley	1:52.81	2022 Swimming World Cup	Toronto, Canada	October 29, 2022	

== Swimming World Cup circuits ==
The following medals Julian has won at Swimming World Cup circuits.

Edition	Gold medals	Silver medals	Bronze medals	Total
2022	1	2	2	5
Total	1	2	2	5

== World records ==
=== Short course meters (25 m pool) ===
No.	Event	Time	Meet	Date	Location	Status	Ref
1	4×200 m freestyle	6:44.12	2022 World Short Course Championships	December 16, 2022	Melbourne, Australia	Current	
2	4×100 m medley	3:18.98	2022 World Short Course Championships	December 18, 2022	Melbourne, Australia	Current	

== Continental and national records ==
=== Short course meters (25 m pool) ===
No.	Event	Time		Meet	Date	Location	Type	Status	Notes	Ref
1	4×200 m freestyle	6:47.00		2021 World Short Course Championships	December 19, 2021	Abu Dhabi, United Arab Emirates	NR	Former		
2	200 m butterfly	1:50.71		2022 Australian Short Course Championships	August 25, 2022	Sydney, Australia	ACR	Former		
3	200 m butterfly (2)	1:49.93	h	2022 World Short Course Championships	December 15, 2022	Melbourne, Australia	ACR	Former		
4	4×200 m freestyle (2)	6:44.12		2022 World Short Course Championships	December 16, 2022	Melbourne, Australia	AM, NR, ACR	Current	WR	
5	4×100 m medley	3:18.98		2022 World Short Course Championships	December 18, 2022	Melbourne, Australia	AM, NR, ACR	Current	WR	

Legend: WR – World record; AM – Americas record; e – equalled existing record; NR – American record; ACR – Australian All Comers record;
Records not set in finals: h – heat; sf – semifinal; r – relay 1st leg; rh – relay heat 1st leg; b – B final; † – en route to final mark; so – swim-off; tt – time trial

== Awards and honors ==
- Glendale News-Press, All-Area Swimmer of the Year (Boys): 2015, 2016
- Glendale News-Press, James H. Jenkins Athlete of the Year (Boys): 2016–17
- Pac-12 Conference, Swimmer of the Week (Men's): February 24, 2021
- SwimSwam, Top 100 (Men's): 2022 (#86)

== See also ==
- List of World Swimming Championships (25 m) medalists (men)
