= Kieran Smith =

American swimmer (born 2000)

Personal information
- National team: United States
- Born: May 20, 2000 (age 26) Sydney, Australia
- Home town: Ridgefield, Connecticut, U.S.
- Height: 6 ft 5 in (196 cm)

Sport
- Sport: Swimming
- Strokes: Freestyle, individual medley
- Club: Ridgefield Aquatic Club
- College team: University of Florida
- Coach: Anthony Nesty
Medal record
Men's swimming
Representing the United States
Olympic Games
| Silver medal – second place | 2024 Paris | 4 × 200 m freestyle |
| Bronze medal – third place | 2020 Tokyo | 400 m freestyle |
World Championships (LC)
| Gold medal – first place | 2022 Budapest | 4×200 m freestyle |
| Silver medal – second place | 2023 Fukuoka | 4×200 m freestyle |
World Championships (SC)
| Gold medal – first place | 2021 Abu Dhabi | 4×200 m freestyle |
| Gold medal – first place | 2022 Melbourne | 400 m freestyle |
| Gold medal – first place | 2022 Melbourne | 4×200 m freestyle |
| Gold medal – first place | 2022 Melbourne | 4×100 m medley |
| Gold medal – first place | 2024 Budapest | 4×100 m freestyle |
| Gold medal – first place | 2024 Budapest | 4×200 m freestyle |
| Silver medal – second place | 2022 Melbourne | 4×50 m medley |
| Silver medal – second place | 2024 Budapest | 400 m freestyle |
| Bronze medal – third place | 2022 Melbourne | 4×100 m freestyle |
World Junior Championships
| Silver medal – second place | 2017 Indianapolis | 200 m medley |

Kieran Smith (born May 20, 2000) is an American swimmer specializing in freestyle and individual medley events. He currently co-holds short course world records in the 4×200-meter freestyle relay and the 4×100-meter medley relay. He was the former Americas record holder in the long course 400-meter freestyle and the former American record holder in the 500-yard freestyle.

In the 400-meter freestyle, he won the bronze medal at the 2020 Summer Olympics and the gold medal at the 2022 World Short Course Championships. Following a fourth-place finish in the 4×200-meter freestyle relay at the 2020 Summer Olympics, he won gold medals in the event at the 2021 World Short Course Championships, 2022 World Aquatics Championships (long course), and the 2022 World Short Course Championships.

== Early life and education ==
Smith grew up in Ridgefield, Connecticut and graduated from Ridgefield High School in 2018. Smith attends the University of Florida where he competes collegiately as part of the Florida Gators and set the American and NCAA records in the 500-yard freestyle with a time of 4:06.32 at the 2020 SEC Championships.

== Career ==
=== Early career ===
In 2016 and 2017, Smith was named Connecticut High School Coaches Association "Swimmer of the Year". In 2017, he qualified for the US National Junior Team and earned a silver medal at the 2017 Junior World Championships in the 200-meter individual medley. He also placed fourth in the 400-meter individual medley and eleventh in the 200-meter backstroke at the Championships.

At the 2018 FINA World Swimming Championships in Hangzhou, China in December 2018, Smith placed 13th in the prelims heats of the 400-meter individual medley with a 4:08.52. In the prelims heats of the 4×200-metre freestyle relay, Smith led-off the relay consisting of him, Jack Conger, Jacob Pebley, and Zach Harting with a 1:43.30 to help qualify the relay to the final ranking second. For the finals relay, all prelims relay members except for Zach Harting were substituted out and the relay placed fourth overall.

During his second year competing collegiately for the Florida Gators, Smith set the 500-yard freestyle American, NCAA, SEC, and Florida records with a 4:06.32 at the 2020 Southeastern Conference Championships in February 2020, which broke the record of 4:08.19 set by Townley Haas in 2019.

For the 2019–2020 season, his second year, Smith received the "Male Swimmer of the Year" award from the Southeastern Conference. At the 2020 U.S. Open Swimming Championships, held in a virtual format in November 2020, he won gold medals in the 200-meter freestyle, with a 1:47.29, and the 400-meter freestyle, with a 3:48.78, as well as a bronze medal in the 800-meter freestyle with a 8:00.05.

=== 2021 ===
During his junior year with the Florida Gators, Smith tied his American record in the 500-yard freestyle, swimming a 4:06.32 at the 2021 Southeastern Conference Championships. His performances at the 2020 and 2021 Southeastern Conference Championships earned him the "Swimmer of the Meet" award at each Championships.

At the 2021 US Open Water Championships, Smith placed seventh in the 5-kilometer open water swim with a time of 1 hour and 13 seconds, and placed tenth in the 10-kilometer open water swim in 2 hours, 12 minutes, and 32 seconds.

==== 2020 US Olympic Trials ====
Smith qualified for the 2020 Olympic Games in the 400-meter freestyle and the 200-meter freestyle, winning both events at the 2020 USA Swimming Olympic Trials. In the prelims, semi-finals, final structure of the 2020 US Olympic Trials, Smith was the only male swimmer to meet the Olympic qualifying standard time in the 400-meter freestyle. He posted new lifetime bests of 3:44.86 in the 400-meter freestyle and 1:45.29 in the 200-meter freestyle. Smith was the first swimmer at the 2020 US Olympic Trials to qualify for the 2020 Summer Olympics in more than one individual event. In the 200-meter individual medley, Smith swam a personal best time of 1:57.23 and finished third overall, not making the US Olympic Team in the event as only the top two event finishers, Michael Andrew and Chase Kalisz, qualified for the team. For the 100-meter freestyle, Smith swam a 49.40 and placed 20th overall in the prelims heats, not advancing to the semi-finals of the event.

==== 2020 Summer Olympics ====
2020 Summer Olympics
| Bronze medal – third place | 400 m freestyle | 3:43.94 |

The 2020 Summer Olympics in Tokyo, Japan and held in 2021 due to the COVID-19 pandemic were Smith's first Olympic Games. On July 25, 2021, Smith won a bronze medal in the 400-meter freestyle, finishing in 3:43.94. Smith's individual bronze medal was his first Olympic medal in any, individual or relay, event and the first Olympic medal for the United States in the 400-meter freestyle since 2012. In the 200-meter freestyle, Smith was the only American to make it to the final of the event on July 27, placing sixth with a time of 1:45.12. The next day, July 28, Smith split the fastest lead-off leg of the 4×200-meter freestyle relay across all finals relay teams with a personal best time of 1:44.74, which was approximately one second faster than the next-fastest lead-off swimmer and helped the United States relay consisting of him, Drew Kibler, Zach Apple, and Townley Haas place fourth with a time of 7:02.43. A crowd of about 70 people welcomed Smith back to his hometown of Ridgefield, Connecticut following the Olympic Games in a Meet and Greet format after his parents had a car pick him up from the airport so they could surprise him when he arrived at the house. Smith's swims for 2021, up to the end of August, were fast enough for him to earn spots in the 200-meter freestyle, 400-meter freestyle, and 200-meter individual medley on the 2021–2022 U.S. National Team.

==== 2021–2022 Collegiate season beginnings ====
Day one of the 2021 Georgia Tech Fall Invitational, November 18, Smith won a total of four events in one night for the Florida Gators, which included the 500-yard freestyle, 200-yard individual medley, 4x50 yard freestyle relay, and 4x100 yard medley relay. The next morning, November 19, Smith raced in three individual events, swimming a 3:49.43 in the 400-yard individual medley, 47.27 in the 100-yard butterfly, and a 46.95 in the 100-yard backstroke. Later in the day, in the finals session, Smith placed second in the 400-yard individual medley with a time of 3:46.95, fifth in the 100-yard backstroke with a time of 46.80 seconds, and first in the 4x200 yard freestyle relay in 6:14.99 where he split a 1:32.66 for the lead-off leg of the relay. Smith's swims earned him the Southeastern Conference, SEC, honor of "Men's Swimmer of the Week" for the sixth week of the collegiate season.

==== 2021 World Short Course Championships ====
2021 World Championships (SC)
| Gold medal – first place | 4×200 m freestyle | 6:47.00 (NR) |

Smith entered to compete in the 200-meter individual medley, 200-meter freestyle, 400-meter individual medley, and 400-meter freestyle at the 2021 World Short Course Championships in Abu Dhabi, United Arab Emirates in December, and the announcement of the United States team, including Smith, for the Championships was the number two item on the Swimming World honor of "The Week That Was" for the week of November 1, 2021. Two weeks before the start of competition, Smith signed a professional sponsorship with Speedo.

On the first day of competition, December 16, Smith ranked second in the prelims heats of the 400-meter freestyle with a time of 3:38.61, qualifying for the final later the same day. In the same prelims session, Smith qualified for the final of the 200-metre individual medley with a 1:54.01, ranking eighth overall. Later in the day, during the finals session, Smith placed fifth in the 400-meter freestyle, swimming a 3:38.77 to finish less than a second behind fourth-place finisher Marco De Tullio of Italy. For his second final of the evening, Smith placed sixth in the 200-meter individual medley with a personal best time of 1:53.76. Day two, Smith swum a personal best time of 1:42.64 in the 200-meter freestyle to win his heat in the prelims and advance to the final ranking fourth. In the final, Smith placed fifth with a time of 1:42.29, finishing two-hundredths of a second behind fourth-place-finisher Duncan Scott of Great Britain.

Day four, Smith split a 21.20 for the third leg of the 4×50-meter freestyle relay, helping qualify the relay for the final ranking third. In the final, he anchored the relay to a fourth-place finish in 1:23.81, splitting a 21.30 for his 50-meter portion of the relay. Later in the same finals session, Smith led-off the 4×200-metre freestyle relay in 1:41.79, helping win the gold medal and set a new American record in the event at 6:47.00. In the prelims heats of the 400-meter individual medley, Smith qualified for the final ranking fifth with a time of 4:04.82, which was over two seconds slower than fellow American and final qualifier Carson Foster. Smith placed fifth in the final with a personal best time of 4:03.29.

=== 2022 ===
==== 2022 Southeastern Conference Championships ====
Smith continued his success in the 4×200 freestyle relay event, this time in yards, at the 2022 Southeastern Conference Championships in February 2022, splitting a 1:30.42 on the lead-off leg of the relay to help win in 6:08.00. The final relay time of 6:08.00 set a new Southeastern Conference record in the event, lowering the former record down 1.14 seconds from a 6:09.14, and Smith's split for the new record time was 1.22 seconds faster than his split of 1:31.64 for the former record. The next morning, he ranked fifth in the prelims heats of the 500-yard freestyle with a 4:14.51 and qualified for the final later in the day. In the evening, Smith split a 18.77 on the 4×50-yard freestyle relay in the final, helping achieve a win in a new meet record time of 1:15.18. Later the same session, he placed second behind Matthew Sates in the final of the 500-yard freestyle with a 4:10.15.

On the third day, Smith started off competition in the morning where he qualified for the final ranking first in the 400-yard individual medley with a 3:43.26. He won the final as well, placing first with a time of 3:39.33. In the evening of the fourth day, he anchored the 4×100-yard medley relay in 41.70 seconds to help achieve a win in 3:02.61. The fifth and final day, he swam a 1:40.90 in the prelims heats of the 200-yard backstroke to qualify for the final ranking fourth. He won the final with a 1:39.51, finishing 0.07 seconds ahead of the second-place finisher. For his final event, Smith anchored the 4×100-yard freestyle relay to a first-place victory in 2:46.91, splitting a time of 41.31 seconds. Smith won a total of two individual titles and four relay titles, earned 92 individual points, and helped the Florida Gators achieve a Southeastern Conference Championships victory that was 476 points ahead of the second-place teams, which marked the largest winning margin in the history of the Southeastern Conference Championships.

==== 2022 NCAA Championships ====
2022 NCAA Championships
| Gold medal – first place | 4×50 yd freestyle | 1:14.11 |
| Bronze medal – third place | 4×100 yd medley | 3:01.00 |

At the 2022 NCAA Championships in late March, Smith helped achieve a seventh-place finish in the 4×200-yard freestyle relay on day one, swimming a 1:30.66 for the lead-off leg of the relay to contribute to the final time of 6:09.01. In the prelims heats of the 500-yard freestyle the following morning, he qualified for the final ranking fifth with his time of 4:10.53. For the final, he placed fourth with a time of 4:08.68. Following his individual event of the evening, he helped achieve a win in the 4×50-yard freestyle relay in a pool record time of 1:14.11, anchoring the relay with a time of 18.59 seconds. He qualified for the final of the 200-yard freestyle the next day, ranking sixth across all preliminary heats with a time of 1:31.90. In his first final of the evening, the 200-yard freestyle, he placed fifth in 1:31.27. In his second final, he helped win the bronze medal in the 4×100-yard medley relay in 3:01.00, anchoring the relay with a 40.96.

Starting off on the fourth and final day, Smith swam a 1:38.99 in the preliminary heats of the 200-yard backstroke to qualify for the final ranking seventh. He swam a 1:39.39 in the final to place fourth, just 0.33 seconds behind the third-place finisher. In the final of the 4×100-yard freestyle relay later in the same session, he anchored the relay to a sixth-place finish in 2:47.39 with a 41.35.

==== 2022 International Team Trials ====
On the first day of the 2022 US International Team Trials in Greensboro, North Carolina, Smith swam a personal best time of 48.50 seconds in the preliminary heats of the 100-meter freestyle to qualify for the final ranking fifth. He swam just one-hundredth of a second slower in the final, achieving a time of 48.51 seconds, to finish 0.26 seconds behind the two swimmers who tied for fourth-place, 0.13 seconds behind the sixth-place swimmer, and place seventh overall. The second morning, he qualified for the final of the 200-meter freestyle from the prelims heats with a time of 1:46.78, which ranked him fourth overall. He won the final with a time of 1:45.25, qualifying in the event, as well as the 4×200-meter freestyle relay, for the 2022 World Aquatics Championships team. Day four, he ranked fourth in the morning prelims heats of the 400-meter freestyle with a 3:50.72 and qualified for the evening final with a time less than half a second slower than the first-ranked swimmer. In the final, he won the event with a time of 3:46.61, marking his second individual event in which he qualified for the 2022 World Aquatics Championships team. Smith started the fifth and final day with the prelims heats of the 200-meter individual medley in the morning, qualifying for the final ranking seventh with a 1:59.60. For his finals swim, he finished in 1:59.83, placing eighth.

==== 2022 World Aquatics Championships ====
2022 World Championships (LC)
| Gold medal – first place | 4×200 m freestyle | 7:00.24 |

Beginning his competition on the first day of pool swimming at the 2022 World Aquatics Championships, Smith ranked fifth in the prelims of the 400-meter freestyle, qualifying for the final. Later in the day, in the final of the event, he placed seventh with a time of 3:46.43. The following day, he ranked eleventh in the prelims of the 200-meter freestyle, qualifying for the semi-finals with a time of 1:46.73. In the evening semi-finals, he dropped over half a second off his prelims time, swimming a 1:46.06 to qualify for the final ranking eighth. He placed sixth in the final with a time of 1:45.16. In the final of the 4×200-meter freestyle relay three days later, he swam the fastest split out of his relay teammates with a 1:44.35 anchor leg to help achieve a final time of 7:00.24 and win the gold medal.

==== 2022 Swimming World Cup ====
On October 21, at the first stop of his first FINA Swimming World Cup, 2022 FINA Swimming World Cup stop in Berlin, Germany, Smith won a silver medal in his first event, the 400-meter freestyle, with a personal best time of 3:37.27, which was less than one second slower than gold medalist Matthew Sates of South Africa. He won his second medal in the 200-meter freestyle, finishing third in a time of 1:42.30 to win the bronze medal behind gold medalist Matthew Sates and silver medalist Kyle Chalmers of Australia. In Toronto, Canada, for the second stop, he won the silver medal in the 400-meter freestyle with a time of 3:38.34. He won his second medal on day three of three in Toronto, finishing behind fellow Americans Brooks Curry (gold medalist) and Trenton Julian (silver medalist) in the 200-meter freestyle to win the bronze medal with a time of 1:42.45.

Day one in Indianapolis for the third and final stop, Smith won a gold medal in the 400-meter freestyle with a new US Open record and personal best time of 3:35.99, which was 1.51 seconds faster than silver medalist Danas Rapšys of Lithuania. On the second morning, he swam a personal best time of 47.12 seconds in the 100-meter freestyle preliminary heats, qualifying for the final ranking third. For his first race of the evening session, he won the gold medal in the 200-meter individual medley with a personal best time of 1:52.98. Approximately 30 minutes later, he placed sixth in the final of the 100-meter freestyle with a personal best time of 47.04 seconds. Completing his competition the following day, he won the gold medal in the 200-meter freestyle with a personal best time of 1:41.78. His performances for the three World Cup stops ranked him as the ninth overall highest-scoring male competitor.

==== 2022 World Short Course Championships ====
2022 World Championships (SC)
| Gold medal – first place | 400 m freestyle | 3:34.38 (AM) |
| Gold medal – first place | 4×200 m freestyle | 6:44.12 (WR) |
| Gold medal – first place | 4×100 m medley | 3:18.98 (WR) |
| Silver medal – second place | 4×50 m medley | 1:30.37 (h) |
| Bronze medal – third place | 4×100 m freestyle | 3:05.09 |

In mid-October, Smith was named to the USA Swimming roster for the 2022 World Short Course Championships, to be contested in December in Melbourne, Australia, in two individual events, the 200-meter freestyle and 400-meter freestyle. He anchored the preliminaries relay to a third-rank in the 4×100-metre freestyle relay with a 46.08 on day one, which helped qualify the relay to the final later the same day. He lowered his time to a 45.77 in the final, helping win the bronze medal with a time of 3:05.09. On day three, he won the gold medal in the 400-meter freestyle with an Americas record, American record, and Australian All Comers record time of 3:34.38, which was 37-hundredths of a second slower than the Championships record of 3:34.01 by Danas Rapšys of Lithuania from 2018. His title was the second for the United States in the event, after Chad Carvin at the 2000 edition of the Championships. The following day, he contributed a personal best time of 1:41.04 for the lead-off leg of the 4×200-meter freestyle relay, helping achieve a time of 6:44.12, which won the gold medal and set a new world record in the event.

Day five of six, Smith anchored the 4×50-meter medley relay with a 21.34 in the preliminaries, helping advance the relay to the final ranking fifth with a time of 1:32.67. On the finals relay, he was switched out for Michael Andrew, and won a silver medal for his efforts in the preliminaries when the finals relay placed second in 1:30.37. The sixth and final day, he placed ninth in the 200-metre freestyle, achieving first-alternate status for the final with a time of 1:42.54. For his final event of the Championships, the 4×100-meter medley relay, he helped set a world record of 3:18.98 in the final, splitting a 45.95 for the freestyle leg of the relay.

== International championships (50 m) ==
| Meet | 200 freestyle | 400 freestyle | 200 backstroke | 200 medley | 400 medley | 4×200 freestyle |
|---|---|---|---|---|---|---|
Junior level
| WJC 2017 | | | 11th | 2nd place, silver medalist(s) | 4th | |
Senior level
| OG 2020 | 6th | 3rd place, bronze medalist(s) | | | | 4th |
| WC 2022 | 6th | 7th | | | | 1st place, gold medalist(s) |

== International championships (25 m) ==
| Meet | 200 freestyle | 400 freestyle | 200 medley | 400 medley | 4×50 freestyle | 4×100 freestyle | 4×200 freestyle | 4×50 medley | 4×100 medley |
|---|---|---|---|---|---|---|---|---|---|
| WC 2018 | | | | 13th | | | 4th^{[a]} | | |
| WC 2021 | 5th | 5th | 6th | 5th | 4th | | 1st place, gold medalist(s) | | |
| WC 2022 | 9th | 1st place, gold medalist(s) | | | | 3rd place, bronze medalist(s) | 1st place, gold medalist(s) | (silver) ^{[a]} | 1st place, gold medalist(s) |

^{a} Smith swam only in the prelims heats.

== Personal best times ==
=== Long course meters (50 m pool) ===
As of July 28, 2022

| Event | Time | | Meet | Location | Date | Age |
|---|---|---|---|---|---|---|
| 100 m freestyle | 48.50 | h | 2022 US International Team Trials | Greensboro, North Carolina | April 26, 2022 | 21 |
| 200 m freestyle | 1:44.74 | r | 2020 Summer Olympics | Tokyo, Japan | July 28, 2021 | 21 |
| 400 m freestyle | 3:43.94 | | 2020 Summer Olympics | Tokyo, Japan | July 25, 2021 | 21 |
| 800 m freestyle | 7:59.27 | | 2021 TYR Pro Swim Series – San Antonio | San Antonio, Texas | January 14, 2021 | 20 |
| 200 m individual medley | 1:57.23 | | 2020 US Olympic Trials | Omaha, Nebraska | June 18, 2021 | 21 |
| 400 m individual medley | 4:14.04 | | 2022 USA Swimming Championships | Irvine, California | July 28, 2022 | 22 |

Legend: h – prelims heat; r — relay 1st leg

=== Short course meters (25 m pool) ===
As of December 16, 2022

| Event | Time | | Meet | Location | Date | Notes | Age |
|---|---|---|---|---|---|---|---|
| 100 m freestyle | 47.04 | | 2022 Swimming World Cup | Indianapolis, Indiana | November 4, 2022 | | 22 |
| 200 m freestyle | 1:41.04 | r | 2022 World Short Course Championships | Melbourne, Australia | December 16, 2022 | | 22 |
| 400 m freestyle | 3:34.38 | | 2022 World Short Course Championships | Melbourne, Australia | December 15, 2022 | AM, NR, ACR | 22 |
| 200 m individual medley | 1:52.98 | | 2022 Swimming World Cup | Indianapolis, Indiana | November 4, 2022 | | 22 |
| 400 m individual medley | 4:03.29 | | 2021 World Short Course Championships | Abu Dhabi, United Arab Emirates | December 20, 2021 | | 21 |

Legend: AM – Americas record; e – equalled existing record; NR – American record; ACR – Australian All Comers record;
Records not set in finals: h – heat; sf – semifinal; r – relay 1st leg; rh – relay heat 1st leg; b – B final; † – en route to final mark; so – swim-off; tt – time trial

== Swimming World Cup circuits ==
The following medals Smith has won at Swimming World Cup circuits.

| Edition | Gold medals | Silver medals | Bronze medals | Total |
|---|---|---|---|---|
| 2022 | 3 | 2 | 2 | 7 |
| Total | 3 | 2 | 2 | 7 |

== World records ==
=== Short course meters (25 m pool) ===
| No. | Event | Time | Meet | Date | Location | Status | Age | Ref |
|---|---|---|---|---|---|---|---|---|
| 1 | 4×200 m freestyle | 6:44.12 | 2022 World Short Course Championships | December 16, 2022 | Melbourne, Australia | Current | 22 | |
| 2 | 4×100 m medley | 3:18.98 | 2022 World Short Course Championships | December 18, 2022 | Melbourne, Australia | Current | 22 | |

== Continental and national records ==
=== Short course meters (25 m pool) ===
| No. | Event | Time | Meet | Date | Location | Type | Status | Notes | Ref |
|---|---|---|---|---|---|---|---|---|---|
| 1 | 4×200 m freestyle | 6:47.00 | 2021 World Short Course Championships | December 19, 2021 | Abu Dhabi, United Arab Emirates | NR | Former | | |
| 2 | 400 m freestyle | 3:35.99 | 2022 FINA Swimming World Cup | November 3, 2022 | Indianapolis, Indiana | US | Current | | |
| 3 | 400 m freestyle (2) | 3:34.38 | 2022 World Short Course Championships | December 15, 2022 | Melbourne, Australia | AM, NR, ACR | Current | | |
| 4 | 4×200 m freestyle (2) | 6:44.12 | 2022 World Short Course Championships | December 16, 2022 | Melbourne, Australia | AM, NR, ACR | Current | WR | |
| 5 | 4×100 m medley | 3:18.98 | 2022 World Short Course Championships | December 18, 2022 | Melbourne, Australia | AM, NR, ACR | Current | WR | |

Legend: WR – World record; AM – Americas record; e – equalled existing record; NR – American record; US – U.S. Open record; ACR – Australian All Comers record;
Records not set in finals: h – heat; sf – semifinal; r – relay 1st leg; rh – relay heat 1st leg; b – B final; † – en route to final mark; so – swim-off; tt – time trial

=== Short course yards (25 yd pool) ===
| No. | Event | Time | | Meet | Date | Location | Type | Status | Ref |
|---|---|---|---|---|---|---|---|---|---|
| 1 | 500 yd freestyle | 4:06.32 | | 2020 Southeastern Conference Championships | February 19, 2020 | Auburn, Alabama | NR, US | Current | |
| 2 | 500 yd freestyle (2) | 4:06.32 | = | 2021 Southeastern Conference Championships | February 24, 2021 | Columbia, Missouri | NR, US | Current | |

Legend: e – equalled existing record; NR – American record; US – U.S. Open record;
Records not set in finals: h – heat; sf – semifinal; r – relay 1st leg; rh – relay heat 1st leg; b – B final; † – en route to final mark; so – swim-off; tt – time trial

== Awards and honors ==
- Swimming World, NCAA Swim of the Year (male): 2021
- Swimming World, The Week That Was: November 1, 2021 (#2)
- SwimSwam, Top 100 (Men's): 2022 (#24)
- Southeastern Conference (SEC), Swimmer of the Championships (male): 2020, 2021
- Southeastern Conference (SEC), Swimmer of the Year (male): 2019–2020
- Southeastern Conference (SEC), Swimmer of the Week (male): November 23, 2021, January 25, 2022
- Connecticut High School Coaches Association (CHSCA), Swimmer of the Year: 2016, 2017

== See also ==
- List of World Swimming Championships (25 m) medalists (men)
- List of Olympic medalists in swimming (men)
- List of United States records in swimming
