= Leonardo Coelho Santos =

Brazilian swimmer (born 1995)

Leonardo Santos
Personal information
- Full name: Leonardo Coelho Santos
- Nationality: Brazil
- Born: 10 April 1995 (age 31) Rio de Janeiro, Rio de Janeiro, Brazil
- Height: 1.88 m (6 ft 2 in)
- Weight: 76 kg (168 lb)

Sport
- Sport: Swimming
- Strokes: Medley, Freestyle
- Club: Esporte Clube Pinheiros
Medal record
Men's swimming
Representing Brazil
World Championships (SC)
Gold medal – first place	2018 Hangzhou	4×200 m freestyle
Bronze medal – third place	2021 Abu Dhabi	4×200 m freestyle
Pan American Games
Gold medal – first place	2023 Santiago	4×200 m freestyle
Silver medal – second place	2019 Lima	400 m medley
Bronze medal – third place	2019 Lima	200 m medley
Bronze medal – third place	2023 Santiago	200 m medley
South American Games
Gold medal – first place	2022 Asunción	4x200 m freestyle
Silver medal – second place	2022 Asunción	200 m medley
Military World Games
Gold medal – first place	2019 Wuhan	4×100 m freestyle
Silver medal – second place	2019 Wuhan	4×200 m freestyle

Leonardo Coelho Santos (born 10 April 1995 in Rio de Janeiro) is a Brazilian swimmer.

== International career ==
At the 2018 FINA World Swimming Championships (25 m) in Hangzhou, China, Leonardo Santos, along with Luiz Altamir Melo, Fernando Scheffer and Breno Correia, surprised the world by winning the gold medal in the Men's 4 × 200 metre freestyle relay, breaking the world record, with a time of 6:46.81. The relay was composed only by young people between 19 and 23 years, and was not favorite to gold. He also finished 6th in the Men's 200 metre individual medley, and 15th in the Men's 400 metre individual medley.

At the 2019 World Aquatics Championships in Gwangju, South Korea, he finished 14th in the Men's 200 metre individual medley.

At the 2019 Pan American Games held in Lima, Peru, he won a silver medal in the Men's 400 metre individual medley, and a bronze medal in the Men's 200 metre individual medley.

At the 2021 FINA World Swimming Championships (25 m) in Abu Dhabi, United Arab Emirates, in the Men's 4 × 200 metre freestyle relay, the Brazilian relay, composed by Breno Correia, Murilo Sartori, Kaique Alves and Fernando Scheffer, again obtained a medal, now bronze, maintaining the good performance of 2018, when Brazil won the gold beating the world record. Coelho Santos won a medal for participating in the competition's heats. He also finished 11th in the Men's 200 metre individual medley, 12th in the Men's 100 metre individual medley, 16th in the Men's 400 metre individual medley and 34th in the Men's 100 metre butterfly

At the 2022 FINA World Swimming Championships (25 m), in Melbourne, Australia, he finished 9th in the Men's 200 metre individual medley, 9th in the Men's 4 × 200 metre freestyle relay, 13th in the Men's 100 metre individual medley and 23rd in the Men's 100 metre butterfly.
