= 2021 FINA World Swimming Championships (25 m) =

Swimming championships

- Host city: Abu Dhabi, UAE
- Date(s): 16–21 December
- Venue(s): Etihad Arena
- Nations participating: 183
- Athletes participating: 943
- Events: 46

The 15th FINA World Swimming Championships (25 m) were held from 16 to 21 December 2021 in Abu Dhabi, United Arab Emirates. It was previously scheduled for 13 to 18 December but moved back three days on 24 February 2021. Originally scheduled to be held in 2020, the championships were pushed back one year as a result of the COVID-19 pandemic. Competition took place in a 25-metre (short course) temporary pool installed at Etihad Arena.

In September 2021, it was announced the Championships would be part of a larger aquatics program, called the Abu Dhabi Aquatics Festival, which includes competition in open water swimming, diving, and high diving.

== Qualification ==
The qualification period for competing at the 2021 World Swimming Championships ran from 1 December 2019 through 28 November 2021. On 23 November 2021, FINA announced it would take into consideration times swum as part of the 2021 International Swimming League and allow them to count towards qualification for the 2021 World Championships. In addition to country-specific selection procedures, competitors were required to achieve a qualifying "A" or "B" time in an event to qualify for the individual or a relay event with individual entries capped at two competitors per country and relay entries capped at one team per country.

Below are the qualifying times for the 2021 World Championships as determined by FINA:

| Event | Men | Women | Men | Women |
| | "A" | | "B" | |
|---|---|---|---|---|
| 50 m freestyle | 21.40 | 24.60 | 22.15 | 25.46 |
| 100 m freestyle | 47.23 | 53.78 | 48.88 | 55.66 |
| 200 m freestyle | 1:44.88 | 1:55.60 | 1:48.55 | 1:59.65 |
| 400 m freestyle | 3:44.09 | 4:06.95 | 3:51.93 | 4:15.59 |
| 800 m freestyle | — | 8:35.69 | — | 8:53.74 |
| 1500 m freestyle | 14:49.29 | — | 15:20.42 | — |
| 50 m backstroke | 23.79 | 26.81 | 24.62 | 27.75 |
| 100 m backstroke | 51.30 | 58.08 | 53.10 | 1:00.11 |
| 200 m backstroke | 1:52.66 | 2:07.19 | 1:56.60 | 2:11.64 |
| 50 m breaststroke | 26.57 | 30.69 | 27.50 | 31.76 |
| 100 m breaststroke | 57.63 | 1:06.18 | 59.65 | 1:08.50 |
| 200 m breaststroke | 2:06.23 | 2:24.30 | 2:10.65 | 2:29.45 |
| 50 m butterfly | 23.08 | 26.14 | 23.89 | 27.05 |
| 100 m butterfly | 51.35 | 58.22 | 53.15 | 1:00.26 |
| 200 m butterfly | 1:54.10 | 2:09.76 | 1:58.09 | 2:14.30 |
| 100 m individual medley | 53.57 | 1:01.21 | 55.44 | 1:03.35 |
| 200 m individual medley | 1:55.25 | 2:11.51 | 1:59.28 | 2:16.11 |
| 400 m individual medley | 4:09.19 | 4:37.54 | 4:17.91 | 4:47.25 |

== Schedule ==
An opening ceremony preceded the start of pool swimming competition on 16 December, was followed by competition from 16 December to 21 December, and concluded with a closing ceremony on 21 December. A total of 46 events were held.

| H | Heats | SF | Semifinals | (gold) | Finals |

M = Morning session (starting at 09:30), E = Evening session (starting at 18:00)

Men
| Date → | Thu 16 | | Fri 17 | | Sat 18 | | Sun 19 | | Mon 20 | | Tue 21 | |
| Event ↓ | M | E | M | E | M | E | M | E | M | E | M | E |
|---|---|---|---|---|---|---|---|---|---|---|---|---|
| 50 m freestyle | | | | | H | SF | | 1st place, gold medalist(s) | | | | |
| 100 m freestyle | | | | | | | | | H | SF | | 1st place, gold medalist(s) |
| 200 m freestyle | | | H | 1st place, gold medalist(s) | | | | | | | | |
| 400 m freestyle | H | 1st place, gold medalist(s) | | | | | | | | | | |
| 1500 m freestyle | | | | | | | | | H | | | 1st place, gold medalist(s) |
| 50 m backstroke | | | | | H | SF | | 1st place, gold medalist(s) | | | | |
| 100 m backstroke | H | SF | | 1st place, gold medalist(s) | | | | | | | | |
| 200 m backstroke | | | | | | | | | | | H | 1st place, gold medalist(s) |
| 50 m breaststroke | | | | | | | | | H | SF | | 1st place, gold medalist(s) |
| 100 m breaststroke | H | SF | | 1st place, gold medalist(s) | | | | | | | | |
| 200 m breaststroke | | | | | H | 1st place, gold medalist(s) | | | | | | |
| 50 m butterfly | | | | | | | H | SF | | 1st place, gold medalist(s) | | |
| 100 m butterfly | | | H | SF | | 1st place, gold medalist(s) | | | | | | |
| 200 m butterfly | H | 1st place, gold medalist(s) | | | | | | | | | | |
| 100 m individual medley | | | | | H | SF | | 1st place, gold medalist(s) | | | | |
| 200 m individual medley | H | 1st place, gold medalist(s) | | | | | | | | | | |
| 400 m individual medley | | | | | | | | | H | 1st place, gold medalist(s) | | |
| 4 × 50 m freestyle relay | | | | | | | H | 1st place, gold medalist(s) | | | | |
| 4 × 100 m freestyle relay | H | 1st place, gold medalist(s) | | | | | | | | | | |
| 4 × 200 m freestyle relay | | | | | | | H | 1st place, gold medalist(s) | | | | |
| 4 × 50 m medley relay | | | | | | | | | H | 1st place, gold medalist(s) | | |
| 4 × 100 m medley relay | | | | | | | | | | | H | 1st place, gold medalist(s) |

Women
| Date → | Thu 16 | | Fri 17 | | Sat 18 | | Sun 19 | | Mon 20 | | Tue 21 | |
| Event ↓ | M | E | M | E | M | E | M | E | M | E | M | E |
|---|---|---|---|---|---|---|---|---|---|---|---|---|
| 50 m freestyle | | | | | | | | | H | SF | | 1st place, gold medalist(s) |
| 100 m freestyle | | | H | SF | | 1st place, gold medalist(s) | | | | | | |
| 200 m freestyle | H | 1st place, gold medalist(s) | | | | | | | | | | |
| 400 m freestyle | | | | | | | H | 1st place, gold medalist(s) | | | | |
| 800 m freestyle | | | H | | | 1st place, gold medalist(s) | | | | | | |
| 50 m backstroke | | | | | | | H | SF | | 1st place, gold medalist(s) | | |
| 100 m backstroke | H | SF | | 1st place, gold medalist(s) | | | | | | | | |
| 200 m backstroke | | | | | H | 1st place, gold medalist(s) | | | | | | |
| 50 m breaststroke | H | SF | | 1st place, gold medalist(s) | | | | | | | | |
| 100 m breaststroke | | | | | | | H | SF | | 1st place, gold medalist(s) | | |
| 200 m breaststroke | | | | | | | | | | | H | 1st place, gold medalist(s) |
| 50 m butterfly | | | | | H | SF | | 1st place, gold medalist(s) | | | | |
| 100 m butterfly | | | | | | | | | H | SF | | 1st place, gold medalist(s) |
| 200 m butterfly | | | H | 1st place, gold medalist(s) | | | | | | | | |
| 100 m individual medley | | | | | H | SF | | 1st place, gold medalist(s) | | | | |
| 200 m individual medley | | | | | | | | | H | 1st place, gold medalist(s) | | |
| 400 m individual medley | H | 1st place, gold medalist(s) | | | | | | | | | | |
| 4 × 50 m freestyle relay | | | | | | | | | | | H | 1st place, gold medalist(s) |
| 4 × 100 m freestyle relay | H | 1st place, gold medalist(s) | | | | | | | | | | |
| 4 × 200 m freestyle relay | | | | | | | | | H | 1st place, gold medalist(s) | | |
| 4 × 50 m medley relay | | | H | 1st place, gold medalist(s) | | | | | | | | |
| 4 × 100 m medley relay | | | | | | | | | | | H | 1st place, gold medalist(s) |

Mixed
| Date → | Thu 16 | | Fri 17 | | Sat 18 | | Sun 19 | | Mon 20 | | Tue 21 | |
| Event ↓ | M | E | M | E | M | E | M | E | M | E | M | E |
|---|---|---|---|---|---|---|---|---|---|---|---|---|
| 4 × 50 m freestyle relay | | | H | 1st place, gold medalist(s) | | | | | | | | |
| 4 × 50 m medley relay | | | | | H | 1st place, gold medalist(s) | | | | | | |

== Medal summary ==
=== Medal table ===
* Host nation (United Arab Emirates)

| Rank | Nation | Gold | Silver | Bronze | Total |
|---|---|---|---|---|---|
| 1 | United States | 9 | 9 | 12 | 30 |
| 2 | Canada | 7 | 6 | 2 | 15 |
| 3 | Italy | 5 | 5 | 6 | 16 |
| 4 | Russian Swimming Federation | 4 | 7 | 4 | 15 |
| 5 | Sweden | 4 | 5 | 3 | 12 |
| 6 | China | 4 | 1 | 2 | 7 |
| 7 | Netherlands | 2 | 3 | 3 | 8 |
| 8 | Hong Kong | 2 | 0 | 1 | 3 |
| 9 | Israel | 2 | 0 | 0 | 2 |
| 9 | Japan | 2 | 0 | 0 | 2 |
| 11 | Germany | 1 | 1 | 1 | 3 |
| 12 | Brazil | 1 | 0 | 2 | 3 |
| 13 | Great Britain | 1 | 0 | 1 | 2 |
| 13 | Poland | 1 | 0 | 1 | 2 |
| 15 | Austria | 1 | 0 | 0 | 1 |
| 15 | Belarus | 1 | 0 | 0 | 1 |
| 15 | South Korea | 1 | 0 | 0 | 1 |
| 18 | Ireland | 0 | 1 | 1 | 2 |
| 18 | Lithuania | 0 | 1 | 1 | 2 |
| 18 | South Africa | 0 | 1 | 1 | 2 |
| 18 | Switzerland | 0 | 1 | 1 | 2 |
| 22 | France | 0 | 1 | 0 | 1 |
| 22 | Norway | 0 | 1 | 0 | 1 |
| 22 | Trinidad and Tobago | 0 | 1 | 0 | 1 |
| 22 | Tunisia | 0 | 1 | 0 | 1 |
| 26 | Bosnia and Herzegovina | 0 | 0 | 1 | 1 |
| 26 | Romania | 0 | 0 | 1 | 1 |
| 26 | Ukraine | 0 | 0 | 1 | 1 |
| Totals (28 entries) | | 48 | 45 | 45 | 138 |

== Results ==
=== Men's events ===
| Event | Gold | | Silver | | Bronze | |
|---|---|---|---|---|---|---|
| 50 m freestyle | Benjamin Proud; Great Britain | 20.45 | Ryan Held; United States | 20.70 | Joshua Liendo; Canada | 20.76 |
| 100 m freestyle | Alessandro Miressi; Italy | 45.57 | Ryan Held; United States | 45.63 | Joshua Liendo; Canada | 45.82 |
| 200 m freestyle | Hwang Sun-woo; South Korea | 1:41.60 | Aleksandr Shchegolev; Russian Swimming Federation | 1:41.63 | Danas Rapšys; Lithuania | 1:41.73 |
| 400 m freestyle | Felix Auböck; Austria | 3:35.90 | Danas Rapšys; Lithuania | 3:36.23 | Antonio Djakovic; Switzerland | 3:36.83 |
| 1500 m freestyle | Florian Wellbrock; Germany | 14:06.88; WR | Ahmed Hafnaoui; Tunisia | 14:10.94; AF | Mykhailo Romanchuk; Ukraine | 14:11.47 |
| 50 m backstroke | Kliment Kolesnikov; Russian Swimming Federation | 22.66 | Christian Diener; Germany Lorenzo Mora; Italy | 22.90 | Not awarded | |
| 100 m backstroke | Shaine Casas; United States | 49.23 | Kliment Kolesnikov; Russian Swimming Federation | 49.46 | Robert Glință; Romania | 49.60 |
| 200 m backstroke | Radosław Kawęcki; Poland | 1:48.68 | Shaine Casas; United States | 1:48.81 | Christian Diener; Germany | 1:48.97 |
| 50 m breaststroke | Nic Fink; United States | 25.53; AM | Nicolò Martinenghi; Italy | 25.55 | João Gomes Júnior; Brazil | 25.80 |
| 100 m breaststroke | Ilya Shymanovich; Belarus | 55.70; CR | Nicolò Martinenghi; Italy | 55.80 | Nic Fink; United States | 55.87 |
| 200 m breaststroke | Nic Fink; United States | 2:02.28 | Arno Kamminga; Netherlands | 2:02.42 | Will Licon; United States | 2:02.84 |
| 50 m butterfly | Nicholas Santos; Brazil | 21.93 | Dylan Carter; Trinidad and Tobago | 21.98 | Matteo Rivolta; Italy | 22.02 |
| 100 m butterfly | Matteo Rivolta; Italy | 48.87 | Chad le Clos; South Africa | 49.04 | Andrey Minakov; Russian Swimming Federation | 49.21 |
| 200 m butterfly | Alberto Razzetti; Italy | 1:49.06 | Noè Ponti; Switzerland | 1:49.81 | Chad le Clos; South Africa | 1:49.84 |
| 100 m individual medley | Kliment Kolesnikov; Russian Swimming Federation | 51.09 | Tomoe Hvas; Norway | 51.35 | Thomas Ceccon; Italy | 51.40 |
| 200 m individual medley | Daiya Seto; Japan | 1:51.15 | Carson Foster; United States | 1:51.35 | Alberto Razzetti; Italy | 1:51.54 |
| 400 m individual medley | Daiya Seto; Japan | 3:56.26 | Ilya Borodin; Russian Swimming Federation | 3:56.47; ER, WJ | Carson Foster; United States | 3:57.99 |
| 4 × 50 m freestyle relay | Italy; Leonardo Deplano (21.37); Lorenzo Zazzeri (20.42); Manuel Frigo (21.21); Alessandro Miressi (20.61) | 1:23.61 | Russian Swimming Federation; Andrei Minakov (21.14); Vladimir Morozov (20.61); Vladislav Grinev (20.72); Aleksandr Shchegolev (21.28); Daniil Markov^{[a]} | 1:23.75 | Netherlands; Jesse Puts (21.30); Stan Pijnenburg (20.91); Kenzo Simons (21.16); Thom de Boer (20.41); Thomas Verhoeven^{[a]} | 1:23.78 |
| 4 × 100 m freestyle relay | Russian Swimming Federation; Kliment Kolesnikov (46.44); Andrey Minakov (45.61); Vladislav Grinev (45.87); Aleksandr Shchegolev (45.53); Vladimir Morozov^{[a]} Daniil Markov^{[a]} | 3:03.45 | Italy; Alessandro Miressi (46.12); Thomas Ceccon (45.71); Leonardo Deplano (45.98); Lorenzo Zazzeri (45.80); Manuel Frigo^{[a]} | 3:03.61 | United States; Ryan Held (45.75); Hunter Tapp (46.78); Shaine Casas (46.50); Zach Apple (46.39); Tom Shields^{[a]} | 3:05.42 |
| 4 × 200 m freestyle relay | United States; Kieran Smith (1:41.79); Trenton Julian (1:41.35); Carson Foster (1:41.65); Ryan Held (1:42.21); Hunter Tapp^{[a]} Zach Harting^{[a]} | 6:47.00 | Russian Swimming Federation; Vladislav Grinev (1:43.18); Aleksandr Shchegolev (1:40.86); Mikhail Vekovishchev (1:42.16); Ivan Girev (1:42.92); Nikolay Snegirev^{[a]} Daniil Shatalov^{[a]} | 6:49.12 | Brazil; Fernando Scheffer (1:42.51); Murilo Sartori (1:42.07); Kaique Alves (1:43.15); Breno Correia (1:41.87); Leonardo Coelho Santos^{[a]} | 6:49.60 |
| 4 × 50 m medley relay | Russian Swimming Federation; Kliment Kolesnikov (22.76); Kirill Strelnikov (25.62); Andrey Minakov (21.76); Vladimir Morozov (20.37); Pavel Samusenko^{[a]} Andrei Nikolaev^{[a]} Oleg Kostin^{[a]} Aleksandr Shchegolev^{[a]} United States; Shaine Casas (23.11); Nic Fink (25.13); Tom Shields (21.75); Ryan Held (20.52); Will Licon^{[a]} Trenton Julian^{[a]} Zach Apple^{[a]} | 1:30.51 =CR | Not awarded | | Italy; Lorenzo Mora (23.24); Nicolò Martinenghi (25.30); Matteo Rivolta (21.95); Lorenzo Zazzeri (20.29); Michele Lamberti^{[a]} Thomas Ceccon^{[a]} | 1:30.78 |
| 4 × 100 m medley relay | Italy; Lorenzo Mora (50.34); Nicolò Martinenghi (55.94); Matteo Rivolta (48.43); Alessandro Miressi (45.05); Thomas Ceccon^{[a]} Alberto Razzetti^{[a]} Lorenzo Zazzeri^{[a]} | 3:19.76; CR | United States; Shaine Casas (50.44); Nic Fink (55.27); Trenton Julian (49.36); Ryan Held (45.43); Hunter Tapp^{[a]} Will Licon^{[a]} Zach Apple^{[a]} | 3:20.50 | Russian Swimming Federation; Kliment Kolesnikov (49.47); Danil Semianinov (57.06); Andrey Minakov (48.81); Aleksandr Shchegolev (45.31); Pavel Samusenko^{[a]} Alexander Zhigalov^{[a]} Roman Shevliakov^{[a]} Vladislav Grinev^{[a]} | 3:20.65 |

^{a} Swimmers who participated in the heats only and received medals.

=== Women's events ===
| Event | Gold | | Silver | | Bronze | |
|---|---|---|---|---|---|---|
| 50 m freestyle | Sarah Sjöström; Sweden | 23.08; CR | Ranomi Kromowidjojo; Netherlands | 23.31 | Katarzyna Wasick; Poland | 23.40 |
| 100 m freestyle | Siobhán Haughey; Hong Kong | 50.98; CR | Sarah Sjöström; Sweden | 51.31 | Abbey Weitzeil; United States | 51.64 |
| 200 m freestyle | Siobhán Haughey; Hong Kong | 1:50.31; WR | Rebecca Smith; Canada | 1:52.24 | Paige Madden; United States | 1:53.01 |
| 400 m freestyle | Li Bingjie; China | 3:55.83 | Summer McIntosh; Canada | 3:57.87 | Siobhán Haughey; Hong Kong | 3:58.12 |
| 800 m freestyle | Li Bingjie; China | 8:02.90; CR | Anastasiya Kirpichnikova; Russian Swimming Federation | 8:06.44 | Simona Quadarella; Italy | 8:07.99 |
| 50 m backstroke | Maggie Mac Neil; Canada | 25.27; WR | Kylie Masse; Canada | 25.62 | Louise Hansson; Sweden | 25.86 |
| 100 m backstroke | Louise Hansson; Sweden | 55.20 | Kylie Masse; Canada | 55.22 | Katharine Berkoff; United States | 55.40 |
| 200 m backstroke | Rhyan White; United States | 2:01.58 | Kylie Masse; Canada | 2:02.07 | Isabelle Stadden; United States | 2:02.20 |
| 50 m breaststroke | Anastasia Gorbenko; Israel | 29.34 | Benedetta Pilato; Italy | 29.50 | Sophie Hansson; Sweden | 29.55 |
| 100 m breaststroke | Tang Qianting; China | 1:03.47; AS | Sophie Hansson; Sweden | 1:03.50 | Mona McSharry; Ireland | 1:03.92 |
| 200 m breaststroke | Emily Escobedo; United States | 2:17.85 | Evgeniia Chikunova; Russian Swimming Federation | 2:17.88 | Molly Renshaw; Great Britain | 2:17.96 |
| 50 m butterfly | Ranomi Kromowidjojo; Netherlands | 24.44; CR | Sarah Sjöström; Sweden | 24.51 | Claire Curzan; United States | 24.55; WJ |
| 100 m butterfly | Maggie Mac Neil; Canada | 55.04 | Louise Hansson; Sweden | 55.10 | Claire Curzan; United States | 55.39; WJ |
| 200 m butterfly | Zhang Yufei; China | 2:03.01 | Charlotte Hook; United States | 2:04.35 | Lana Pudar; Bosnia and Herzegovina | 2:04.88 |
| 100 m individual medley | Anastasia Gorbenko; Israel | 57.80 | Béryl Gastaldello; France | 57.96 | Maria Kameneva; Russian Swimming Federation | 58.15 |
| 200 m individual medley | Sydney Pickrem; Canada | 2:04.29 | Yu Yiting; China | 2:04.48 =WJ | Kate Douglass; United States | 2:04.68 |
| 400 m individual medley | Tessa Cieplucha; Canada | 4:25.55 | Ellen Walshe; Ireland | 4:26.52 | Melanie Margalis; United States | 4:26.63 |
| 4 × 50 m freestyle relay | United States; Abbey Weitzeil (23.59); Claire Curzan (23.40); Katharine Berkoff (23.81); Kate Douglass (23.42); Torri Huske^{[b]} | 1:34.22 | Sweden; Sarah Sjöström (23.33); Michelle Coleman (23.38); Sara Junevik (24.02); Louise Hansson (23.81); Hanna Rosvall^{[b]} | 1:34.54 | Netherlands; Kim Busch (24.29); Maaike de Waard (23.71); Kira Toussaint (24.01); Ranomi Kromowidjojo (22.88); Marrit Steenbergen^{[b]} Tessa Giele^{[b]} | 1:34.89 |
| 4 × 100 m freestyle relay | United States; Kate Douglass (52.39); Claire Curzan (52.25); Katharine Berkoff (52.38); Abbey Weitzeil (51.50); Torri Huske^{[b]} Canada; Kayla Sanchez (51.73); Maggie Mac Neil (52.07); Rebecca Smith (52.11); Katerine Savard (52.61); Bailey Andison^{[b]} | 3:28.52 | Not awarded | | Sweden; Sarah Sjöström (51.45); Michelle Coleman (52.06); Sophie Hansson (53.41); Louise Hansson (51.88); Sara Junevik^{[b]} | 3:28.80 |
| 4 × 200 m freestyle relay | Canada; Summer McIntosh (1:54.30); Kayla Sanchez (1:52.97); Katerine Savard (1:54.01); Rebecca Smith (1:51.68); Tessa Cieplucha^{[b]} Sydney Pickrem^{[b]} | 7:32.96; AM | United States; Torri Huske (1:54.72); Abbey Weitzeil (1:54.31); Melanie Margalis (1:54.83); Paige Madden (1:52.67); Katharine Berkoff^{[b]} Emma Weyant^{[b]} | 7:36.53 | China; Li Bingjie (1:53.42); Cheng Yujie (1:54.91); Zhu Menghui (1:55.73); Liu Yaxin (1:55.86) | 7:39.92 |
| 4 × 50 m medley relay | Sweden; Louise Hansson (25.91); Sophie Hansson (29.07); Sarah Sjöström (23.96); Michelle Coleman (23.44); Hanna Rosvall^{[b]} Emelie Fast^{[b]} | 1:42.38 =WR | United States; Rhyan White (26.33); Lydia Jacoby (29.62); Claire Curzan (24.56); Abbey Weitzeil (23.10); Katharine Berkoff^{[b]} Emily Escobedo^{[b]} Kate Douglass^{[b]} | 1:43.61 | Netherlands; Kira Toussaint (26.08); Kim Busch (30.59); Maaike de Waard (24.51); Ranomi Kromowidjojo (22.85); Tessa Giele^{[b]} | 1:44.03 |
| 4 × 100 m medley relay | Sweden; Louise Hansson (56.25); Sophie Hansson (1:03.70); Sarah Sjöström (54.65); Michelle Coleman (51.60); Hanna Rosvall^{[b]} Emelie Fast^{[b]} | 3:46.20; ER | Canada; Kylie Masse (55.76); Sydney Pickrem (1:04.97); Maggie Mac Neil (55.30); Kayla Sanchez (51.33); Katerine Savard^{[b]} Summer McIntosh^{[b]} | 3:47.36 | China; Peng Xuwei (57.12); Tang Qianting (1:03.25); Zhang Yufei (54.93); Cheng Yujie (52.11); Wan Letian^{[b]} Yu Yiting^{[b]} Zhu Jiaming^{[b]} | 3:47.41; AS |

^{b} Swimmers who participated in the heats only and received medals.

=== Mixed events ===
| Event | Gold | | Silver | | Bronze | |
|---|---|---|---|---|---|---|
| 4 × 50 m freestyle relay | Canada; Joshua Liendo (20.94); Yuri Kisil (20.99); Kayla Sanchez (23.51); Maggie Mac Neil (23.11); Rebecca Smith^{[c]} Katerine Savard^{[c]} | 1:28.55 | Netherlands; Jesse Puts (21.33); Thom de Boer (20.35); Ranomi Kromowidjojo (22.97); Kira Toussaint (23.96); Kenzo Simons^{[c]} | 1:28.61 | Russian Swimming Federation; Vladimir Morozov (21.17); Andrey Minakov (20.95); Maria Kameneva (23.17); Arina Surkova (23.68); Daniil Markov^{[c]} Rozaliya Nasretdinova^{[c]} | 1:28.97 |
| 4 × 50 m medley relay | Netherlands; Kira Toussaint (26.21); Arno Kamminga (25.40); Ranomi Kromowidjojo (24.36); Thom de Boer (20.23); Tessa Giele^{[c]} Nyls Korstanje^{[c]} Kim Busch^{[c]} | 1:36.20; CR | United States; Shaine Casas (23.16); Nic Fink (25.82); Claire Curzan (24.85); Abbey Weitzeil (23.21); Kate Douglass^{[c]} Katharine Berkoff^{[c]} | 1:37.04 | Italy; Lorenzo Mora (23.28); Nicolò Martinenghi (25.60); Elena Di Liddo (24.91); Silvia Di Pietro (23.50); Michele Lamberti^{[c]} Benedetta Pilato^{[c]} Leonardo Deplano^{[c]} | 1:37.29 |

^{c} Swimmers who participated in the heats only and received medals.

== Coverage ==
More than 180 countries provided viewing opportunities through television broadcast and online streaming mediums. One of the broadcasting agencies providing coverage of pool swimming competition internationally is the Olympic Channel. Additional international coverage was provided by Eurovision Sports.

== Variations in country representation ==
Due to a multi-year ban of Russian representation at World Championships by the Court of Arbitration for Sport, competitors from the country were not allowed to compete using their flag, anthem, nor country name during competition, instead competing with the name Russian Swimming Federation.

== Issues related to COVID-19 ==
On 14 December 2021, it was announced that South African swimmers residing in South Africa would not be able to compete in the championships, due to travel bans resulting from the prevalence of the Omicron variant of COVID-19, which is the World Health Organization's latest “variant of concern.”

On 16 December 2021, FINA informed the Singapore Swimming Association (now Singapore Aquatics) that its entire squad will not be able to compete in the championships due to contact tracing protocols, after four of the country's swimmers tested positive for COVID-19 while in Abu Dhabi.

On 17 December 2021, FINA confirmed seven accredited participants with positive COVID-19 results, which included at least one administrator from Nigeria, and that in turn knocked out all four of Nigeria's swimmers from the meet. This raised questions about its protocols, as some swimmers from other nations such as Great Britain and the United States were allowed to continue competing despite members of those teams testing positive for COVID-19.

By the end of the championships on 21 December 2021, FINA provided a cap number of 40 individuals who tested positive in the duration of the meet. Later the exact number of COVID-19 positive accounts was provided, 37 cases total out of all 5,000 individuals involved with the competition, 15 of which were athlete cases.
