= 2021 FINA World Swimming Championships (25 m) – Men's 4 × 200 metre freestyle relay =

Swimming competition

Men's 4 × 200 metre freestyle relay at the 2021 FINA World Swimming Championships (25 m)
- Venue: Etihad Arena
- Location: Abu Dhabi, United Arab Emirates
- Dates: 19 December (heats and final)
- Competitors: 51 from 11 nations
- Teams: 11
- Winning time: 6:47.00

Medalists
gold medal	Kieran Smith; Trenton Julian; Carson Foster; Ryan Held; Hunter Tapp; Zach Harting	United States
silver medal	Vladislav Grinev; Aleksandr Shchegolev; Mikhail Vekovishchev; Ivan Girev; Nikolay Snegirev; Daniil Shatalov
bronze medal	Fernando Scheffer; Murilo Sartori; Kaique Alves; Breno Correia; Leonardo Coelho Santos	Brazil

The Men's 4 × 200 metre freestyle relay competition of the 2021 FINA World Swimming Championships (25 m) was held on 19 December 2021.

== Records ==
Prior to the competition, the existing world and championship records were as follows.

World record	Brazil (BRA)	6:46.81	Hangzhou, China	14 December 2018
Competition record	Brazil (BRA)	6:46.81	Hangzhou, China	14 December 2018

== Results ==
=== Heats ===
The heats were started at 11:03.

Rank	Heat	Lane	Nation	Swimmers	Time	Notes
1	1	4	Russian Swimming Federation	Nikolay Snegirev (1:44.06); Ivan Girev (1:43.25); Daniil Shatalov (1:44.30); Mikhail Vekovishchev (1:43.22)	6:54.83	Q
2	1	5	Italy	Alberto Razzetti (1:43.01); Filippo Megli (1:43.44); Marco De Tullio (1:45.06); Matteo Lamberti (1:45.01)	6:56.52	Q
3	1	3	Brazil	Breno Correia (1:43.23); Murilo Sartori (1:43.81); Kaique Alves (1:44.38); Leonardo Coelho Santos (1:45.14)	6:56.56	Q
4	2	3	China	Hong Jinquan (1:45.10); Pan Zhanle (1:44.66); Zhang Ziyang (1:45.70); Chen Ende (1:44.73)	7:00.19	Q
5	1	1	Norway	Tomoe Hvas (1:44.18 NR); Markus Lie (1:44.96); Henrik Christiansen (1:45.56); Jon Jøntvedt (1:46.33)	7:01.03	Q, NR
6	2	6	Ireland	Jack McMillan (1:42.98); Robert Powell (1:47.41); Finn McGeever (1:45.98); Jordan Sloan (1:45.98)	7:02.35	Q, NR
7	2	5	United States	Trenton Julian (1:43.33); Hunter Tapp (1:47.77); Zach Harting (1:46.16); Carson Foster (1:45.62)	7:02.88	Q
8	2	2	Turkey	Baturalp Ünlü (1:45.18); Efe Turan (1:46.92); Mert Kılavuz (1:49.61); Berke Saka (1:48.18)	7:09.89	Q
9	1	2	Hong Kong	Cheuk Ming Ho (1:46.60); Ng Yan Kin (1:54.21); Ho Tin Long (1:55.03); Michael Ng (1:55.70)	7:31.54	
10	2	7	Kuwait	Waleed Abdulrazzaq (1:52.60); Faisal Al-Tannak (1:56.58); Mashari Al-Samhan (1:57.93); Sauod Al-Shamroukh (1:55.53)	7:42.64	
11	1	7	Vietnam	Phạm Thanh Bảo (2:00.53); Hồ Nguyễn Duy Khoa (1:54.33); Nguyễn Hữu Kim Sơn (1:52.46); Trần Hưng Nguyên (1:57.52)	7:44.84	
	1	6	Singapore		DNS	
	2	1	Bulgaria		DNS	
	2	4	Great Britain		DNS	

=== Final ===
The final was held at 19:58.

Rank	Lane	Nation	Swimmers	Time	Notes
1st place, gold medalist(s)	1	United States	Kieran Smith (1:41.79); Trenton Julian (1:41.35); Carson Foster (1:41.65); Ryan Held (1:42.21)	6:47.00	NR
2nd place, silver medalist(s)	4	Russian Swimming Federation	Vladislav Grinev (1:43.18); Aleksandr Shchegolev (1:40.86); Mikhail Vekovishchev (1:42.16); Ivan Girev (1:42.92)	6:49.12	
3rd place, bronze medalist(s)	3	Brazil	Fernando Scheffer (1:42.51); Murilo Sartori (1:42.07); Kaique Alves (1:43.15); Breno Correia (1:41.87)	6:49.60	
4	5	Italy	Matteo Ciampi (1:42.93); Thomas Ceccon (1:44.23); Filippo Megli (1:42.99); Alberto Razzetti (1:41.33)	6:51.48	NR
5	6	China	Hong Jinquan (1:45.44); Pan Zhanle (1:43.12); Zhang Ziyang (1:44.53); Chen Ende (1:45.45)	6:58.54	
6	7	Ireland	Jack McMillan (1:42.84); Jordan Sloan (1:44.94); Finn McGeever (1:45.84); Robert Powell (1:45.92)	6:59.54	NR
7	2	Norway	Tomoe Hvas (1:44.51); Markus Lie (1:44.37); Henrik Christiansen (1:45.08); Jon Jøntvedt (1:47.27)	7:01.23	
8	8	Turkey	Baturalp Ünlü (1:44.25); Efe Turan (1:47.12); Mert Kılavuz (1:48.41); Berke Saka (1:47.55)	7:07.33	NR
