= Breno Correia =

Brazilian swimmer (born 1999)

Personal information
- Full name: Breno Martins Correia
- Nationality: Brazil
- Born: 19 February 1999 (age 27) Salvador, Bahia, Brazil
- Height: 1.88 m (6 ft 2 in)
- Weight: 79 kg (174 lb)

Sport
- Sport: Swimming
- Strokes: Freestyle
Medal record
Men's swimming
Representing Brazil
World Championships (SC)
Gold medal – first place	2018 Hangzhou	4×200 m freestyle
Bronze medal – third place	2018 Hangzhou	4×100 m freestyle
Bronze medal – third place	2021 Abu Dhabi	4×200 m freestyle
Pan American Games
Gold medal – first place	2019 Lima	4×100 m freestyle
Gold medal – first place	2019 Lima	4×200 m freestyle
Gold medal – first place	2023 Santiago	4×100 m freestyle
Gold medal – first place	2023 Santiago	4×200 m freestyle
Silver medal – second place	2019 Lima	200 m freestyle
Silver medal – second place	2019 Lima	4×100 m medley
Silver medal – second place	2019 Lima	4×100 m mixed freestyle
South American Games
Gold medal – first place	2018 Cochabamba	100 m freestyle
Gold medal – first place	2018 Cochabamba	4×200 m freestyle
Gold medal – first place	2022 Asunción	4×200 m freestyle
Silver medal – second place	2018 Cochabamba	4×100 m freestyle
Bronze medal – third place	2022 Asunción	200 m freestyle
South American Championships
Gold medal – first place	2018 Trujillo	100 m freestyle
Gold medal – first place	2018 Trujillo	200 m freestyle
Gold medal – first place	2018 Trujillo	4×100 m freestyle
Gold medal – first place	2018 Trujillo	4×200 m freestyle
Gold medal – first place	2018 Trujillo	4×100 m medley
Gold medal – first place	2018 Trujillo	4×100 m mixed freestyle
World University Games
Silver medal – second place	2021 Chengdu	4×100 m freestyle
Bronze medal – third place	2021 Chengdu	4×200 m freestyle
Bronze medal – third place	2021 Chengdu	4×100 m mixed freestyle

Breno Martins Correia (born 19 February 1999) is a Brazilian swimmer.

== Early life ==
He started in the ACEB team of Bahia where, under the command of Márcio Cunha and Luiz Arapiraca, he won the first medals from Mirim to Petiz I. With his father's transfer to Rio de Janeiro, Breno went swimming in the Clube dos Aliados with Professor Paulo Machado. Training there, he competed for Vasco, then Tijuca until he reached Flamengo. From Juvenil II, Breno faced the training in a more committed way. Under the command of Eduardo Pereira became one of the best young swimmers in the country until the invitation of the Pinheiros to where he transferred in 2017, at 18 years old. The midfielder swimmer who arrived in Pinheiros became a 100-meter and 200 meter specialist at the hands of coach Alberto Silva (Albertinho).

== International career ==
=== 2018–20 ===
At the 2018 South American Games in Cochabamba, he won two gold medals in the 100m and 4x200m freestyle and a silver medal at the 4x100m freestyle. Soon after, in the Brazil Trophy, he was the runner-up in the 200 meters freestyle (1:47.94) and finished in 6th place in the 100 meters freestyle, with a time of 48.78.

At the 2018 FINA World Swimming Championships (25 m) in Hangzhou, China, Correia, along with Marcelo Chierighini, Matheus Santana and César Cielo, won the bronze medal in the Men's 4 × 100 metre freestyle relay, with a time of 3:05.15, setting a South American record. Later, along with Fernando Scheffer, Leonardo Coelho Santos and Luiz Altamir Melo, he surprised the world by winning the gold medal in the Men's 4 × 200 metre freestyle relay, breaking the world record, with a time of 6:46.81. The relay was composed only of young people between 19 and 23 years and was not favorite to gold. In the Men's 4 × 100 metre medley relay, he finished 4th. He also finished 5th in the Men's 200 metre freestyle, just 0.08s away from winning the bronze medal.

At the 2019 World Aquatics Championships in Gwangju, South Korea, in the Men's 100 metre freestyle, Correia reached his first World Championship final, finishing in 8th place. Brazil's young 4 × 200 metre freestyle relay team, now with João de Lucca instead of Leonardo Coelho Santos, lowered the South American record in almost 3 seconds, with a time of 7:07.12, at heats. They finished 7th, with a time of 7:07.64 in the final. It was the first time that Brazil's 4x200m freestyle relay had qualified for a World Championships final, and the result qualified Brazil for the Tokyo 2020 Olympics. In the Men's 4 × 100 metre freestyle relay and in the Men's 4 × 100 metre medley relay, he finished 6th, helping Brazil qualify for the Tokyo 2020 Olympics. He also finished 17th in the Men's 200 metre freestyle.

At the 2019 Pan American Games held in Lima, Peru, Correia won 5 medals: two golds in Men's 4 × 100 metre freestyle relay and Men's 4 × 200 metre freestyle relay, breaking the Pan American Games record in both races; and three silver medals in Men's 200 metre freestyle, Mixed 4 × 100 metre freestyle relay and Men's 4 × 100 metre medley relay (by participating at heats). He also finished 5th in the Men's 100 metre freestyle.

=== 2020 Summer Olympics ===
At the 2020 Summer Olympics in Tokyo, Correia finished 8th in the Men's 4 × 100 metre freestyle relay.

=== 2021–24 ===
At the 2021 FINA World Swimming Championships (25 m) in Abu Dhabi, United Arab Emirates, in the Men's 4 × 200 metre freestyle relay, the Brazilian relay, composed by Correia, Murilo Sartori, Kaique Alves and Fernando Scheffer, again obtained a medal, now bronze, maintaining the good performance of 2018, when Brazil won the gold beating the world record.

At the 2022 World Aquatics Championships held in Budapest, Hungary, in the Men's 4 × 200 metre freestyle relay event, the Brazilian team, composed by Correia, Fernando Scheffer, Vinicius Assunção and Murilo Sartori, broke the South American record twice in a row, in the heats, and the finals, reaching a time of 7:04.69 and obtaining an unprecedented fourth place in the long-distance World Championships. The Brazilian team just didn't get a medal because of the exceptional performance of Tom Dean when closing the British relay. He also finished 22nd in the Men's 200 metre freestyle.
