= 2022 FINA World Swimming Championships (25 m) =

Swimming competition

- Host city: Melbourne, Australia
- Date: 13–18 December
- Venue: Melbourne Sports and Aquatic Centre
- Nations: 154
- Athletes: 721 (391 men; 330 women)
- Events: 48

The 16th FINA World Swimming Championships (25 m) took place from 13 to 18 December 2022 in Melbourne, Australia at the Melbourne Sports and Aquatic Centre. Swimming events in the championships were conducted in a 25-metre outdoor (short course) pool.

For the first time at a FINA World Swimming Championships (25 m), the 800 metre freestyle was contested for men and the 1500 metre freestyle for women, with qualification for competition determined based on times assessed per the FINA points system.

The Championships were originally scheduled for 17 to 22 December 2022 at the Palace of Water Sports in Kazan, Russia, and were relocated in response to the 2022 Russian invasion of Ukraine. All athletes and officials from Russia and Belarus were banned from the Championships by FINA.

== Qualification ==
The qualification period for the 2022 World Swimming Championships ran from 24 July 2021 through 13 November 2022.

Below were the qualifying times as determined by FINA:

Event	Men	Women	Men	Women
	"A"		"B"	
50 m freestyle	21.40	24.44	22.15	25.30
100 m freestyle	47.23	53.78	48.88	55.66
200 m freestyle	1:44.08	1:55.60	1:47.72	1:59.65
400 m freestyle	3:42.50	4:06.95	3:50.29	4:15.59
800 m freestyle	7:45.02	8:29.17	8:01.30	8:46.99
1500 m freestyle	14:49.29	16:15.27	15:20.42	16:49.40
50 m backstroke	23.75	26.81	24.58	27.75
100 m backstroke	51.30	58.08	53.10	1:00.11
200 m backstroke	1:52.66	2:07.19	1:56.60	2:11.64
50 m breaststroke	26.57	30.45	27.50	31.52
100 m breaststroke	57.63	1:06.18	59.65	1:08.50
200 m breaststroke	2:06.23	2:23.38	2:10.65	2:28.40
50 m butterfly	22.91	25.82	23.71	26.72
100 m butterfly	50.57	57.40	52.34	59.41
200 m butterfly	1:53.61	2:08.85	1:57.59	2:13.36
100 m individual medley	52.98	59.65	54.83	1:01.74
200 m individual medley	1:55.25	2:10.16	1:59.28	2:14.72
400 m individual medley	4:09.19	4:37.54	4:17.91	4:47.25

== Schedule ==
An opening ceremony preceded the start of competition on 13 December and a closing ceremony concluded the Championships on 18 December following competition termination.

A total of 48 events were contested over six consecutive days.

H	Heats	SF	Semifinals	(gold)	Finals

M = Morning session (starting at 11:00), E = Evening session (starting at 19:30)

Men
Date →	Tue 13		Wed 14		Thu 15		Fri 16		Sat 17		Sun 18	
Event ↓	M	E	M	E	M	E	M	E	M	E	M	E
50 m freestyle							H	SF		1st place, gold medalist(s)		
100 m freestyle			H	SF		1st place, gold medalist(s)						
200 m freestyle											H	1st place, gold medalist(s)
400 m freestyle					H	1st place, gold medalist(s)						
800 m freestyle									H	1st place, gold medalist(s)		
1500 m freestyle	H	1st place, gold medalist(s)										
50 m backstroke					H	SF		1st place, gold medalist(s)				
100 m backstroke	H	SF		1st place, gold medalist(s)								
200 m backstroke											H	1st place, gold medalist(s)
50 m breaststroke									H	SF		1st place, gold medalist(s)
100 m breaststroke			H	SF		1st place, gold medalist(s)						
200 m breaststroke							H	1st place, gold medalist(s)				
50 m butterfly	H	SF		1st place, gold medalist(s)								
100 m butterfly									H	SF		1st place, gold medalist(s)
200 m butterfly					H	1st place, gold medalist(s)						
100 m individual medley					H	SF		1st place, gold medalist(s)				
200 m individual medley	H	1st place, gold medalist(s)										
400 m individual medley									H	1st place, gold medalist(s)		
4 × 50 m freestyle relay					H	1st place, gold medalist(s)						
4 × 100 m freestyle relay	H	1st place, gold medalist(s)										
4 × 200 m freestyle relay							H	1st place, gold medalist(s)				
4 × 50 m medley relay									H	1st place, gold medalist(s)		
4 × 100 m medley relay											H	1st place, gold medalist(s)

Women
Date →	Tue 13		Wed 14		Thu 15		Fri 16		Sat 17		Sun 18	
Event ↓	M	E	M	E	M	E	M	E	M	E	M	E
50 m freestyle							H	SF		1st place, gold medalist(s)		
100 m freestyle			H	SF		1st place, gold medalist(s)						
200 m freestyle											H	1st place, gold medalist(s)
400 m freestyle	H	1st place, gold medalist(s)										
800 m freestyle			H	1st place, gold medalist(s)								
1500 m freestyle							H	1st place, gold medalist(s)				
50 m backstroke					H	SF		1st place, gold medalist(s)				
100 m backstroke	H	SF		1st place, gold medalist(s)								
200 m backstroke											H	1st place, gold medalist(s)
50 m breaststroke									H	SF		1st place, gold medalist(s)
100 m breaststroke			H	SF		1st place, gold medalist(s)						
200 m breaststroke							H	1st place, gold medalist(s)				
50 m butterfly	H	SF		1st place, gold medalist(s)								
100 m butterfly									H	SF		1st place, gold medalist(s)
200 m butterfly					H	1st place, gold medalist(s)						
100 m individual medley					H	SF		1st place, gold medalist(s)				
200 m individual medley	H	1st place, gold medalist(s)										
400 m individual medley									H	1st place, gold medalist(s)		
4 × 50 m freestyle relay					H	1st place, gold medalist(s)						
4 × 100 m freestyle relay	H	1st place, gold medalist(s)										
4 × 200 m freestyle relay			H	1st place, gold medalist(s)								
4 × 50 m medley relay									H	1st place, gold medalist(s)		
4 × 100 m medley relay											H	1st place, gold medalist(s)

Mixed
Date →	Tue 13		Wed 14		Thu 15		Fri 16		Sat 17		Sun 18	
Event ↓	M	E	M	E	M	E	M	E	M	E	M	E
4 × 50 m freestyle relay							H	1st place, gold medalist(s)				
4 × 50 m medley relay			H	1st place, gold medalist(s)								

== Medal summary ==
=== Medal table ===
* Host nation (Australia)

Rank	Nation	Gold	Silver	Bronze	Total
1	United States	17	13	6	36
2	Australia*	13	8	5	26
3	Italy	5	6	5	16
4	Canada	3	4	7	14
5	South Africa	3	1	1	5
6	Japan	2	2	2	6
7	France	1	3	1	5
8	Netherlands	1	1	6	8
9	Hong Kong	1	1	0	2
10	Lithuania	1	0	1	2
11	Brazil	1	0	0	1
11	Cayman Islands	1	0	0	1
11	South Korea	1	0	0	1
14	New Zealand	0	2	0	2
15	Great Britain	0	1	3	4
16	Norway	0	1	1	2
16	Poland	0	1	1	2
16	Switzerland	0	1	1	2
19	Romania	0	1	0	1
20	Sweden	0	0	3	3
21	China	0	0	2	2
21	Germany	0	0	2	2
23	Hungary	0	0	1	1
23	Trinidad and Tobago	0	0	1	1
Totals (24 entries)		50	46	49	145

== Results ==
=== Men's events ===
Event	Gold		Silver		Bronze	
50 m freestyle	Jordan Crooks; Cayman Islands	20.46	Benjamin Proud; Great Britain	20.49	Dylan Carter; Trinidad and Tobago	20.72
100 m freestyle	Kyle Chalmers; Australia	45.16; CR	Maxime Grousset; France	45.41	Alessandro Miressi; Italy	45.57 =NR
200 m freestyle	Hwang Sun-woo; South Korea	1:39.72; CR, AS	David Popovici; Romania	1:40.79; NR	Tom Dean; Great Britain	1:40.86
400 m freestyle	Kieran Smith; United States	3:34.38; AM	Thomas Neill; Australia	3:35.05	Danas Rapšys; Lithuania	3:36.26
800 m freestyle	Gregorio Paltrinieri; Italy	7:29.99; CR	Henrik Christiansen; Norway	7:31.48	Logan Fontaine; France	7:33.12
1500 m freestyle	Gregorio Paltrinieri; Italy	14:16.88	Damien Joly; France	14:19.62; NR	Henrik Christiansen; Norway	14:24.08
50 m backstroke	Ryan Murphy; United States	22.64	Isaac Cooper; Australia	22.73	Kacper Stokowski; Poland	22.74
100 m backstroke	Ryan Murphy; United States	48.50; CR	Lorenzo Mora; Italy	49.04; NR	Isaac Cooper; Australia	49.52
200 m backstroke	Ryan Murphy; United States	1:47.41	Shaine Casas; United States	1:48.01	Lorenzo Mora; Italy	1:48.45; NR
50 m breaststroke	Nic Fink; United States	25.38; CR, AM	Nicolò Martinenghi; Italy	25.42	Simone Cerasuolo; Italy	25.68
100 m breaststroke	Nic Fink; United States	55.88	Nicolò Martinenghi; Italy	56.07	Adam Peaty; Great Britain	56.25
200 m breaststroke	Daiya Seto; Japan	2:00.35; AS	Nic Fink; United States	2:01.60; AM	Qin Haiyang; China	2:02.22
50 m butterfly	Nicholas Santos; Brazil	21.78; CR	Noè Ponti; Switzerland	21.96; NR	Szebasztián Szabó; Hungary	21.98
100 m butterfly	Chad le Clos; South Africa	48.59	Ilya Kharun; Canada	49.03; WJ, NR	Marius Kusch; Germany	49.12
200 m butterfly	Chad le Clos; South Africa	1:48.27; AF	Daiya Seto; Japan	1:49.22	Noè Ponti; Switzerland	1:49.42; NR
100 m individual medley	Thomas Ceccon; Italy	50.97	Javier Acevedo; Canada	51.05; NR	Finlay Knox; Canada	51.10
200 m individual medley	Matthew Sates; South Africa	1:50.15; AF	Carson Foster; United States	1:50.96	Finlay Knox; Canada	1:51.04; NR
400 m individual medley	Daiya Seto; Japan	3:55.75	Carson Foster; United States	3:57.63	Matthew Sates; South Africa	3:59.21; NR
4 × 50 m freestyle relay	Australia; Isaac Cooper (21.25); Matthew Temple (20.75); Flynn Southam (21.10); Kyle Chalmers (20.34); Grayson Bell^{[a]}	1:23.44; OC	Italy; Alessandro Miressi (21.22); Leonardo Deplano (20.59); Thomas Ceccon (20.67); Manuel Frigo (21.00); Paolo Conte Bonin^{[a]}	1:23.48	Netherlands; Kenzo Simons (21.24); Nyls Korstanje (20.84); Stan Pijnenburg (20.95); Thom de Boer (20.72)	1:23.75
4 × 100 m freestyle relay	Italy; Alessandro Miressi (46.15); Paolo Conte Bonin (45.93); Leonardo Deplano (45.54); Thomas Ceccon (45.13); Manuel Frigo^{[a]}	3:02.75; WR	Australia; Flynn Southam (47.04); Matthew Temple (46.06); Thomas Neill (46.55); Kyle Chalmers (44.98); Shaun Champion^{[a]}	3:04.63; OC	United States; Drew Kibler (46.84); Shaine Casas (45.90); Carson Foster (46.58); Kieran Smith (45.77); David Curtiss^{[a]} Trenton Julian^{[a]}	3:05.09
4 × 200 m freestyle relay	United States; Kieran Smith (1:41.04); Carson Foster (1:40.48); Trenton Julian (1:41.44); Drew Kibler (1:41.16); Jake Magahey^{[a]} Jake Foster^{[a]}	6:44.12; WR	Australia; Thomas Neill (1:41.50); Kyle Chalmers (1:40.35); Flynn Southam (1:41.50); Mack Horton (1:43.19); Clyde Lewis^{[a]} Stuart Swinburn^{[a]} Brendon Smith^{[a]}	6:46.54; OC	Italy; Matteo Ciampi (1:42.68); Thomas Ceccon (1:42.61); Alberto Razzetti (1:42.76); Paolo Conte Bonin (1:41.58); Manuel Frigo^{[a]}	6:49.63; NR
4 × 50 m medley relay	Italy; Lorenzo Mora (22.65); Nicolò Martinenghi (24.95); Matteo Rivolta (21.60); Leonardo Deplano (20.52); Simone Cerasuolo^{[a]} Thomas Ceccon^{[a]} Alessandro Miressi^{[a]}	1:29.72; WR	United States; Ryan Murphy (22.61); Nic Fink (25.24); Shaine Casas (22.13); Michael Andrew (20.39); Hunter Armstrong^{[a]} Trenton Julian^{[a]} Kieran Smith^{[a]}	1:30.37; AM	Australia; Isaac Cooper (22.66); Grayson Bell (25.92); Matthew Temple (21.75); Kyle Chalmers (20.48); Shaun Champion^{[a]} Flynn Southam^{[a]}	1:30.81; OC
4 × 100 m medley relay	Australia; Isaac Cooper (49.46); Joshua Yong (56.55); Matthew Temple (48.34); Kyle Chalmers (44.63); Shaun Champion^{[a]} United States; Ryan Murphy (48.96); Nic Fink (54.88); Trenton Julian (49.19); Kieran Smith (45.95); Hunter Armstrong^{[a]} Carson Foster^{[a]}	3:18.98; WR	Not awarded		Italy; Lorenzo Mora (49.48); Nicolò Martinenghi (55.52); Matteo Rivolta (48.50); Alessandro Miressi (45.56); Thomas Ceccon^{[a]} Simone Cerasuolo^{[a]} Alberto Razzetti^{[a]} Paolo Conte Bonin^{[a]}	3:19.06; ER

^{a} Swimmers who participated in the heats only and received medals.

=== Women's events ===
Event	Gold		Silver		Bronze	
50 m freestyle	Emma McKeon; Australia	23.04; CR, OC	Katarzyna Wasick; Poland	23.55	Anna Hopkin; Great Britain	23.68
100 m freestyle	Emma McKeon; Australia	50.77; CR	Siobhán Haughey; Hong Kong	50.87	Marrit Steenbergen; Netherlands	51.25
200 m freestyle	Siobhán Haughey; Hong Kong	1:51.65	Rebecca Smith; Canada	1:52.24	Marrit Steenbergen; Netherlands	1:52.28
400 m freestyle	Lani Pallister; Australia	3:55.04	Erika Fairweather; New Zealand	3:56.00	Leah Smith; United States	3:59.78
800 m freestyle	Lani Pallister; Australia	8:04.07; NR	Erika Fairweather; New Zealand	8:10.41	Miyu Namba; Japan	8:12.98; NR
1500 m freestyle	Lani Pallister; Australia	15:21.43; CR, OC	Miyu Namba; Japan	15:46.76	Kensey McMahon; United States	15:49.15
50 m backstroke	Maggie Mac Neil; Canada	25.25; WR	Claire Curzan; United States	25.54; NR	Mollie O'Callaghan; Australia	25.61; OC
100 m backstroke	Kaylee McKeown; Australia	55.49	Mollie O'Callaghan; Australia	55.62	Claire Curzan; United States Ingrid Wilm; Canada	55.74
200 m backstroke	Kaylee McKeown; Australia	1:59.26	Claire Curzan; United States	2:00.53	Kylie Masse; Canada	2:01.26; NR
50 m breaststroke	Rūta Meilutytė; Lithuania	28.50	Lara van Niekerk; South Africa	29.09; AF	Lilly King; United States	29.11
100 m breaststroke	Lilly King; United States	1:02.67	Tes Schouten; Netherlands	1:03.90; NR	Anna Elendt; Germany	1:04.05; NR
200 m breaststroke	Kate Douglass; United States	2:15.77; CR	Lilly King; United States	2:17.13	Tes Schouten; Netherlands	2:18.19; NR
50 m butterfly	Torri Huske; United States Maggie Mac Neil; Canada	24.64 24.64; NR	Not awarded		Zhang Yufei; China	24.71 =AS
100 m butterfly	Maggie Mac Neil; Canada	54.05; WR	Torri Huske; United States	54.75	Louise Hansson; Sweden	54.87
200 m butterfly	Dakota Luther; United States	2:03.37	Hali Flickinger; United States	2:03.78	Elizabeth Dekkers; Australia	2:03.94
100 m individual medley	Marrit Steenbergen; Netherlands	57.53; NR	Béryl Gastaldello; France	57.63	Louise Hansson; Sweden	57.68
200 m individual medley	Kate Douglass; United States	2:02.12; AM	Alex Walsh; United States	2:03.37	Kaylee McKeown; Australia	2:03.57; OC
400 m individual medley	Hali Flickinger; United States	4:26.51	Sara Franceschi; Italy	4:28.58	Waka Kobori; Japan	4:29.03
4 × 50 m freestyle relay	United States; Torri Huske (24.08); Claire Curzan (23.30); Erika Brown (23.74); Kate Douglass (22.77); Erin Gemmell^{[b]} Natalie Hinds^{[b]} Alex Walsh^{[b]}	1:33.89; CR, AM	Australia; Meg Harris (23.98); Madison Wilson (23.51); Mollie O'Callaghan (24.01); Emma McKeon (22.73); Alexandria Perkins^{[b]} Brittany Castelluzzo^{[b]}	1:34.23; OC	Netherlands; Kim Busch (24.20); Maaike de Waard (23.47); Kira Toussaint (24.01); Valerie van Roon (23.68); Tessa Vermeulen^{[b]}	1:35.36
4 × 100 m freestyle relay	Australia; Mollie O'Callaghan (52.19); Madison Wilson (51.28); Meg Harris (52.00); Emma McKeon (49.96); Leah Neale^{[b]}	3:25.43; WR	United States; Torri Huske (51.73); Kate Douglass (51.17); Claire Curzan (51.59); Erika Brown (51.80); Erin Gemmell^{[b]} Natalie Hinds^{[b]}	3:26.29; AM	Canada; Rebecca Smith (52.68); Taylor Ruck (51.49); Maggie Mac Neil (51.11); Katerine Savard (52.78); Mary-Sophie Harvey^{[b]}	3:28.06; NR
4 × 200 m freestyle relay	Australia; Madison Wilson (1:53.13); Mollie O'Callaghan (1:52.83); Leah Neale (1:52.67); Lani Pallister (1:52.24); Meg Harris^{[b]} Brittany Castelluzzo^{[b]} Laura Taylor^{[b]}	7:30.87; WR	Canada; Rebecca Smith (1:52.15); Katerine Savard (1:54.78); Mary-Sophie Harvey (1:54.81); Taylor Ruck (1:52.73); Sydney Pickrem^{[b]} Kelsey Wog^{[b]}	7:34.47	United States; Alex Walsh (1:53.90); Hali Flickinger (1:53.48); Erin Gemmell (1:52.23); Leah Smith (1:55.09); Erika Brown^{[b]} Jillian Cox^{[b]}	7:34.70; NR
4 × 50 m medley relay	Australia; Mollie O'Callaghan (25.49) OC; Chelsea Hodges (29.11); Emma McKeon (24.43); Madison Wilson (23.32); Kaylee McKeown^{[b]} Jenna Strauch^{[b]}	1:42.35; WR	United States; Claire Curzan (25.75); Lilly King (29.00); Torri Huske (24.94); Kate Douglass (22.72); Alex Walsh^{[b]} Annie Lazor^{[b]} Erika Brown^{[b]} Natalie Hinds^{[b]}	1:42.41	Sweden; Louise Hansson (25.86); Klara Thormalm (29.34); Sara Junevik (24.06); Michelle Coleman (23.17); Hanna Rosvall^{[b]} Sofia Åstedt^{[b]}	1:42.43
4 × 100 m medley relay	United States; Claire Curzan (56.47); Lilly King (1:02.88); Torri Huske (54.53); Kate Douglass (50.47); Alex Walsh^{[b]} Erika Brown^{[b]}	3:44.35; WR	Australia; Kaylee McKeown (55.74); Jenna Strauch (1:04.49); Emma McKeon (53.93); Meg Harris (50.76); Mollie O'Callaghan^{[b]} Chelsea Hodges^{[b]} Alexandria Perkins^{[b]}	3:44.92; OC	Canada; Ingrid Wilm (55.36); Sydney Pickrem (1:04.42); Maggie Mac Neil (54.59); Taylor Ruck (51.85); Kylie Masse^{[b]} Rachel Nicol^{[b]} Katerine Savard^{[b]} Rebecca Smith^{[b]}	3:46.22; NR

^{b} Swimmers who participated in the heats only and received medals.

=== Mixed events ===
Event	Gold		Silver		Bronze	
4 × 50 m freestyle relay	France; Maxime Grousset (20.92); Florent Manaudou (20.26); Béryl Gastaldello (23.00); Mélanie Henique (23.15); Mary-Ambre Moluh^{[c]}	1:27.33; WR	Australia; Kyle Chalmers (20.97); Matthew Temple (20.71); Meg Harris (23.73); Emma McKeon (22.62); Flynn Southam^{[c]} Madison Wilson^{[c]}	1:28.03; OC	Netherlands; Kenzo Simons (21.14); Thom de Boer (20.61); Maaike de Waard (23.35); Marrit Steenbergen (23.43); Stan Pijnenburg^{[c]} Nyls Korstanje^{[c]}	1:28.53
4 × 50 m medley relay	United States; Ryan Murphy (22.37); Nic Fink (24.96); Kate Douglass (24.09); Torri Huske (23.73); Shaine Casas^{[c]} Michael Andrew^{[c]} Alex Walsh^{[c]}	1:35.15; WR	Italy; Lorenzo Mora (22.59); Nicolò Martinenghi (24.83); Silvia Di Pietro (24.52); Costanza Cocconcelli (24.07); Simone Cerasuolo^{[c]}	1:36.01; ER	Canada; Kylie Masse (25.71); Javier Acevedo (25.95); Ilya Kharun (22.12); Maggie Mac Neil (23.15); Ingrid Wilm^{[c]} Rebecca Smith^{[c]}	1:36.93; NR

^{c} Swimmers who participated in the heats only and received medals.

== Records set ==
=== World records ===
Date	Start time	Event	Stage	Established for	Time	Name	Nation	Ref
13 December	21:22	4 × 100 m freestyle relay (Women's)	Final	(same)	3:25.43	Mollie O'Callaghan; Madison Wilson; Meg Harris; Emma McKeon	Australia	
13 December	21:32	4 × 100 m freestyle relay (Men's)	Final	(same)	3.02.75	Alessandro Miressi; Paolo Conte Bonin; Leonardo Deplano; Thomas Ceccon	Italy	
14 December	19:35	4 × 50 m medley relay (Mixed)	Final	(same)	1.35.15	Ryan Murphy; Nic Fink; Kate Douglass; Torri Huske	United States	
14 December	21:32	4 × 200 m freestyle relay (Women's)	Final	(same)	7:30.87	Madison Wilson; Mollie O'Callaghan; Leah Neale; Lani Pallister	Australia	
16 December	19:35	4 × 50 m freestyle relay (Mixed)	Final	(same)	1:27.33	Maxime Grousset; Florent Manaudou; Béryl Gastaldello; Mélanie Henique	France	
16 December	20:06	50 m backstroke (Women's)	Final	(same)	25.25	Maggie Mac Neil	Canada	
16 December	21:45	4 × 200 m freestyle relay (Men's)	Final	(same)	6:44.12	Kieran Smith; Carson Foster; Trenton Julian; Drew Kibler	United States	
17 December	19:35	4 × 50 m medley relay (Women's)	Final	(same)	1:42.35	Mollie O'Callaghan; Chelsea Hodges; Emma McKeon; Madison Wilson	Australia	
17 December	19:43	4 × 50 m medley relay (Men's)	Final	(same)	1:29.72	Lorenzo Mora; Nicolò Martinenghi; Matteo Rivolta; Leonardo Deplano	Italy	
17 December	21:07	50 m breaststroke (Women's)	Semifinals	(same)	28.37	Rūta Meilutytė	Lithuania	
18 December	19:35	100 m butterfly (Women's)	Final	(same)	54.05	Maggie Mac Neil	Canada	
18 December	21:03	4 × 100 m medley relay (Women's)	Final	(same)	3:44.35	Claire Curzan; Lilly King; Torri Huske; Kate Douglass	United States	
18 December	21:19	4 × 100 m medley relay (Men's)	Final	(same)	=3:18.98	Isaac Cooper; Joshua Yong; Matthew Temple; Kyle Chalmers	Australia	
18 December	21:19	4 × 100 m medley relay (Men's)	Final	(same)	=3:18.98	Ryan Murphy; Nic Fink; Trenton Julian; Kieran Smith	United States	

=== Championships records ===
Date	Start time	Event	Stage	Time	Name	Nation	Ref
14 December	20.32	100 m backstroke (Men's)	Final	48.50	Ryan Murphy	United States	
14 December	21:20	50 m butterfly (Men's)	Final	21.78	Nicholas Santos	Brazil	
15 December	19:35	100 m freestyle (Women's)	Final	50.77	Emma McKeon	Australia	
15 December	19:42	100 m freestyle (Men's)	Final	45.16	Kyle Chalmers	Australia	
15 December	21:46	4 × 50 m freestyle relay (Women's)	Final	1:33.89	Torri Huske; Claire Curzan; Erika Brown; Kate Douglass	United States	
16 December	19:42	200 m breaststroke (Women's)	Final	2:15.77	Kate Douglass	United States	
16 December	21:16	1500 m freestyle (Women's)	Final	15:21.43	Lani Pallister	Australia	
17 December	19:50	800 m freestyle (Men's)	Final	7:29.99	Gregorio Paltrinieri	Italy	
17 December	21:33	50 m freestyle (Women's)	Final	23.04	Emma McKeon	Australia	
18 December	20:01	50 m breaststroke (Men's)	Final	25.38	Nic Fink	United States	
18 December	20:50	200 m freestyle (Men's)	Final	1:39.72	Hwang Sun-woo	South Korea	

=== Area records ===
Date	Start time	Event	Stage	Time	Name	Nation	Area record	Ref
13 December	12:12	50 m butterfly (Men's)	Heats	22.01	Teong Tzen Wei	Singapore	Asian record	
13 December	13:09	4 × 100 m freestyle relay (Women's)	Heats	3.28.58	Meg Harris; Madison Wilson; Leah Neale; Emma McKeon	Australia	Oceanian record	
13 December	20:11	200 m individual medley (Women's)	Final	2:02.12	Kate Douglass	United States	Americas record	
13 December	20:11	200 m individual medley (Women's)	Final	2:03.57	Kaylee McKeown	Australia	Oceanian record	
13 December	20:19	200 m individual medley (Men's)	Final	1:50.15	Matthew Sates	South Africa	African record	
13 December	20:38	100 m backstroke (Men's)	Semifinals	49.85	Pieter Coetze	South Africa	African record	
13 December	21:22	4 × 100 m freestyle relay (Women's)	Final	3.26.29	Torri Huske; Kate Douglass; Claire Curzan; Erika Brown	United States	Americas record	
13 December	21:32	4 × 100 m freestyle relay (Men's)	Final	3.04.63	Flynn Southam; Matthew Temple; Thomas Neill; Kyle Chalmers	Australia	Oceanian record	
14 December	19:35	4 × 50 medley relay (Mixed)	Final	1:36.01	Lorenzo Mora; Nicolò Martinenghi; Silvia Di Pietro; Costanza Cocconcelli	Italy	European record	
14 December	19:35	4 × 50 medley relay (Mixed)	Final	1:37.31	Wang Gukailai; Yan Zibei; Zhang Yufei; Wu Qingfeng	China	Asian record	
14 December	20:32	100 m backstroke (Men's)	Final	49.60	Pieter Coetze	South Africa	African record	
14 December	21:14	50 m butterfly (Women's)	Final	24.71	Zhang Yufei	China	=Asian record	
14 December	21:20	50 m butterfly (Men's)	Final	22.01	Teong Tzen Wei	Singapore	=Asian record	
15 December	11:19	50 m backstroke (Men's)	Heats	22.79	Isaac Cooper	Australia	Oceanian record	
15 December	12:02	100 m individual medley (Women's)	Heats	59.38	Rebecca Meder	South Africa	African record	
15 December	12:52	50 m freestyle (Women's) in 4 × 50 m freestyle relay (Women's)	Heats	24.33	Caitlin de Lange	South Africa	African record	
15 December	12:52	4 × 50 m freestyle relay (Women's)	Heats	1:36.14	Meg Harris; Alexandria Perkins; Brittany Castelluzzo; Mollie O'Callaghan	Australia	Oceanian record	
15 December	12:52	4 × 50 m freestyle relay (Women's)	Heats	1:40.80	Caitlin de Lange; Rebecca Meder; Emily Visagie; Milla Drakopoulos	South Africa	African record	
15 December	12:59	4 × 50 m freestyle relay (Men's)	Heats	1:24.17	Kosuke Matsui; Masahiro Kawane; Takeshi Kawamoto; Katsumi Nakamura	Japan	Asian record	
15 December	19:42	100 m freestyle (Men's)	Final	45.77	Pan Zhanle	China	Asian record	
15 December	19:48	50 m backstroke (Women's)	Semifinals	25.69	Mollie O'Callaghan	Australia	Oceanian record	
15 December	19:59	50 m backstroke (Men's)	Semifinals	22.52	Isaac Cooper	Australia	Oceanian record	
15 December	20:23	200 m butterfly (Men's)	Final	1:48.27	Chad le Clos	South Africa	African record	
15 December	20:57	100 m individual medley (Women's)	Semifinals	58.98	Rebecca Meder	South Africa	African record	
15 December	21:31	400 m freestyle (Men's)	Final	3:34.38	Kieran Smith	United States	Americas record	
15 December	21:46	4 × 50 m freestyle relay (Women's)	Final	1:33.89	Torri Huske; Claire Curzan; Erika Brown; Kate Douglass	United States	Americas record	
15 December	21:46	4 × 50 m freestyle relay (Women's)	Final	1:34.23	Meg Harris; Madison Wilson; Mollie O'Callaghan; Emma McKeon	Australia	Oceanian record	
15 December	21:54	4 × 50 m freestyle relay (Men's)	Final	1:23.44	Isaac Cooper; Matthew Temple; Flynn Southam; Kyle Chalmers	Australia	Oceanian record	
15 December	21:54	4 × 50 m freestyle relay (Men's)	Final	1:23.80	Kosuke Matsui; Masahiro Kawane; Takeshi Kawamoto; Katsumi Nakamura	Japan	Asian record	
16 December	19:35	4 × 50 m freestyle relay (Mixed)	Final	1:28.03	Kyle Chalmers; Matthew Temple; Meg Harris; Emma McKeon	Australia	Oceanian record	
16 December	19:51	200 m breaststroke (Men's)	Final	2:00.35	Daiya Seto	Japan	Asian record	
16 December	19:51	200 m breaststroke (Men's)	Final	2:01.60	Nic Fink	United States	Americas record	
16 December	20:06	50 m backstroke (Women's)	Final	25.61	Mollie O'Callaghan	Australia	Oceanian record	
16 December	20:56	100 m individual medley (Women's)	Final	58.46	Rebecca Meder	South Africa	African record	
16 December	21:11	50 m backstroke (Men's)	Final	22.84	Pieter Coetze	South Africa	African record	
16 December	21:16	1500 m freestyle (Women's)	Final	15:21.43	Lani Pallister	Australia	Oceanian record	
16 December	21:45	4 × 200 m freestyle relay (Men's)	Final	6:46.54	Thomas Neill; Kyle Chalmers; Flynn Southam; Mack Horton	Australia	Oceanian record	
17 December	11:05	4 × 50 m medley relay (Women's)	Heats	1:44.78	Kaylee McKeown; Jenna Strauch; Emma McKeon; Madison Wilson	Australia	Oceanian record	
17 December	12:36	50 m breaststroke (Women's)	Heats	29.45	Lara van Niekerk	South Africa	African record	
17 December	19:35	50 m backstroke (Women's) in 4 × 50 m medley relay (Women's)	Final	25.49	Mollie O'Callaghan	Australia	Oceanian record	
17 December	19:43	4 × 50 m medley relay (Men's)	Final	1:30.37	Ryan Murphy; Nic Fink; Shaine Casas; Michael Andrew	United States	Americas record	
17 December	19:43	4 × 50 m medley relay (Men's)	Final	1:30.81	Isaac Cooper; Grayson Bell; Matthew Temple; Kyle Chalmers	Australia	Oceanian record	
17 December	19:43	4 × 50 m medley relay (Men's)	Final	1:31.28	Takeshi Kawamoto; Yuya Hinomoto; Yuya Tanaka; Masahiro Kawane	Japan	Asian record	
17 December	19:50	800 m freestyle (Men's)	Final	7:33.78	Shogo Takeda	Japan	Asian record	
17 December	21:07	50 m breaststroke (Women's)	Semifinals	29.27	Lara van Niekerk	South Africa	African record	
17 December	21:17	50 m breaststroke (Men's)	Semifinals	25.80	Yan Zibei	China	Asian record	
17 December	21:17	50 m breaststroke (Men's)	Semifinals	26.24	Grayson Bell	Australia	=Oceanian record	
17 December	21:33	50 m freestyle (Women's)	Final	23.04	Emma McKeon	Australia	Oceanian record	
18 December	12:17	4 × 100 m medley relay (Women's)	Heats	3:59.64	Milla Drakopoulos; Emily Visagie; Rebecca Meder; Caitlin de Lange	South Africa	African record	
18 December	19:49	50 m breaststroke (Women's)	Final	29.09	Lara van Niekerk	South Africa	African record	
18 December	20:01	50 m breaststroke (Men's)	Final	25.38	Nic Fink	United States	Americas record	
18 December	20:50	200 m freestyle (Men's)	Final	1:39.72	Hwang Sun-woo	South Korea	Asian record	
18 December	21:03	4 × 100 m medley relay (Women's)	Final	3:44.92	Kaylee McKeown; Jenna Strauch; Emma McKeon; Meg Harris	Australia	Oceanian record	
18 December	21:19	4 × 100 m medley relay (Men's)	Final	3:19.06	Lorenzo Mora; Nicolò Martinenghi; Matteo Rivolta; Alessandro Miressi	Italy	European record	

=== World junior records ===
Date	Start time	Event	Stage	Time	Name	Nation	Ref
13 December	12:12	50 m butterfly (Men's)	Heats	22.32	Ilya Kharun	Canada	
13 December	19:55	50 m butterfly (Men's)	Semifinals	22.28	Ilya Kharun	Canada	
14 December	10:55	50 m butterfly (Men's)	Semifinals swim-off	=22.28	Ilya Kharun	Canada	
14 December	20:08	100 m freestyle (Men's)	Semifinals	45.91	David Popovici	Romania	
15 December	19:42	100 m freestyle (Men's)	Final	45.64	David Popovici	Romania	
15 December	19:59	50 m backstroke (Men's)	Semifinals	22.52	Isaac Cooper	Australia	
18 December	19:42	100 m butterfly (Men's)	Final	49.03	Ilya Kharun	Canada	

== Participating nations ==
Swimmers from the following nations competed at the Championships.

1. Afghanistan (1)
2. Albania (3)
3. Algeria (2)
4. Andorra (3)
5. Antigua and Barbuda (1)
6. Argentina (3)
7. Armenia (2)
8. Aruba (2)
9. Australia (35)
10. Austria (6)
11. Bahamas (4)
12. Bahrain (1)
13. Bangladesh (2)
14. Barbados (1)
15. Belgium (3)
16. Benin (1)
17. Bhutan (2)
18. Bolivia (3)
19. Bosnia and Herzegovina (3)
20. Botswana (3)
21. Brazil (10)
22. Brunei (1)
23. Bulgaria (10)
24. Burundi (3)
25. Cameroon (2)
26. Canada (17)
27. Cape Verde (2)
28. Cayman Islands (2)
29. Central African Republic (1)
30. Chile (1)
31. China (24)
32. Chinese Taipei (8)
33. Colombia (4)
34. Comoros (2)
35. Cook Islands (4)
36. Croatia (3)
37. Cuba (2)
38. Cyprus (1)
39. Czech Republic (10)
40. Denmark (3)
41. Dominican Republic (4)
42. Ecuador (2)
43. Egypt (5)
44. El Salvador (2)
45. Estonia (4)
46. Eswatini (3)
47. Faroe Islands (1)
48. Federated States of Micronesia (4)
49. Fiji (4)
50. Finland (5)
51. France (20)
52. Gambia (1)
53. Georgia (2)
54. Germany (8)
55. Ghana (2)
56. Gibraltar (4)
57. Great Britain (11)
58. Greece (3)
59. Guatemala (4)
60. Guinea (3)
61. Guam (4)
62. Guyana (2)
63. Haiti (2)
64. Honduras (3)
65. Hong Kong (16)
66. Hungary (2)
67. Iceland (2)
68. India (2)
69. Iran (2)
70. Iraq (1)
71. Israel (2)
72. Italy (18)
73. Japan (40)
74. Kazakhstan (2)
75. Kosovo (2)
76. Kuwait (4)
77. Kyrgyzstan (1)
78. Latvia (4)
79. Lebanon (2)
80. Libya (2)
81. Lithuania (4)
82. Luxembourg (2)
83. Macau (4)
84. Madagascar (2)
85. Malawi (3)
86. Maldives (4)
87. Mali (2)
88. Malta (2)
89. Marshall Islands (2)
90. Mauritius (2)
91. Mexico (2)
92. Moldova (3)
93. Mongolia (4)
94. Mozambique (1)
95. Namibia (2)
96. Nepal (4)
97. Netherlands (16)
98. New Zealand (15)
99. Niger (2)
100. Nigeria (1)
101. Northern Mariana Islands (4)
102. Norway (7)
103. Oman (1)
104. Pakistan (2)
105. Palau (4)
106. Palestine (3)
107. Panama (3)
108. Papua New Guinea (4)
109. Paraguay (5)
110. Peru (6)
111. Philippines (5)
112. Poland (8)
113. Portugal (1)
114. Puerto Rico (3)
115. Qatar (2)
116. Republic of the Congo (2)
117. Romania (3)
118. Rwanda (1)
119. Saint Kitts and Nevis (1)
120. Samoa (4)
121. Saudi Arabia (2)
122. Senegal (2)
123. Serbia (2)
124. Sierra Leone (4)
125. Singapore (4)
126. Sint Maarten (2)
127. Slovakia (12)
128. Slovenia (4)
129. Solomon Islands (1)
130. South Africa (14)
131. South Korea (7)
132. Spain (9)
133. Sri Lanka (4)
134. Sudan (2)
135. Suspended Member Federation (4)
136. Sweden (12)
137. Switzerland (4)
138. Syria (2)
139. Tanzania (4)
140. Thailand (5)
141. Timor-Leste (2)
142. Togo (2)
143. Tonga (4)
144. Trinidad and Tobago (1)
145. Turkey (9)
146. Turkmenistan (2)
147. Uganda (3)
148. Ukraine (4)
149. United Arab Emirates (4)
150. United States (35)
151. United States Virgin Islands (3)
152. Uruguay (4)
153. Uzbekistan (2)
154. Zimbabwe (4)

== Change of host and dates ==
Originally, the 2022 FINA World Swimming Championships (25 m) were scheduled to take place in Kazan, Russia at the Palace of Water Sports, with Kazan selected as the host location in July 2017. On 17 December 2020, the Russians were banned by the Court of Arbitration for Sport through 16 December 2022 from using their country name, anthem, and flag at any World Championships, potentially including this Championships to be held in their own country. In November 2021, over four years after the announcement of Kazan as host, the dates of competition, 17 to 22 December 2022, were announced.

Following escalating political tensions between Russia and Ukraine in late February 2022, FINA published a statement on 25 February 2022 in regards to holding competitions later in 2022, such as the 2022 World Swimming Championships, stating, "Other FINA events that are scheduled in Russia for later in the year are under close review, with FINA monitoring events in Ukraine very carefully."

On 26 February 2022, nine Nordic Swimming Federation members published a collaborative statement announcing that due to 2022 Russian invasion of Ukraine they will withdraw from competing at the Championships if it is hosted in Russia as a way of expressing support for Ukraine. Swimming federation presidents from the following national swimming federations signed the statement: Danish Swimming Union (Denmark), Estonian Swimming Federation (Estonia), Faroe Islands Swimming Association (Faroe Islands), Finnish Swimming Federation (Finland), Icelandic Swimming Association (Iceland), Latvian Swimming Federation (Latvia), Lithuanian Swimming Federation (Lithuania), Norwegian Swimming Federation (Norway), Swedish Swimming Federation (Sweden).

On 27 February 2022, Swimming Australia indicated they would not send athletes to the World Championships even if the location changed, publishing a statement saying they "made the decision to not send teams to any other events currently scheduled in Russia, including the FINA World Short Course Championships in December." Two days later, British Swimming followed suit, stating, "British Swimming supports a ban on Russia and Belarus from all aquatics competition, and confirms that it will be withdrawing from all events currently due to take place in Russia or Belarus, including the 2022 FINA World Short Course Championships and the 2024 European Championships, both scheduled for Kazan, Russia." The same day, Swimming Canada also published a statement withdrawing its athletes, stating, "Due to the acts of aggression being perpetrated by Russia against Ukraine, Swimming Canada will not send a team to the 2022 FINA World Swimming Championships (25m), scheduled for Kazan, Russia, this December."

On 28 February 2022, the International Olympic Committee published a statement pushing for the ban of Russian and Belarusian athletes and officials in international sporting competitions, stating, "In order to protect the integrity of global sports competitions and for the safety of all the participants, the IOC EB recommends that International Sports Federations and sports event organisers not invite or allow the participation of Russian and Belarusian athletes and officials in international competitions."

On 1 March 2022, FINA published a statement regarding athlete participation in FINA competitions stating, "Until further notice, no athlete or Aquatics official from Russia or Belarus be allowed to take part under the name of Russia or Belarus. Russian or Belarusian nationals, be it as individuals or teams, should be accepted only as neutral athletes or neutral teams. No national symbols, colours, flags should be displayed or anthems should be played, in international Aquatics events which are not already part of the respective World Anti-Doping Agency (WADA) sanctions for Russia."

On 23 March 2022, FINA announced the Russian Swimming Federation had pulled all of its athletes from competing in FINA events for the remainder of the 2022 year, including the 2022 World Swimming Championships, and withdrew the event from its originally scheduled host location at the Palace of Water Sports in Kazan, Russia. Almost one month later, in mid-April, FINA decided to exclude all Russian and Belarusian officials and athletes from the Championships.

On 20 May 2022, FINA announced the Championships would officially be transplanted to new host Melbourne, Australia with the dates of competition from 13 to 18 December 2022 and the Melbourne Sports and Aquatic Centre serving as the new venue for the Championships.

== See also ==
- List of swimming competitions
- World Aquatics Swimming Championships (25m)
- 2022 in sports
