= List of Brazilian records in swimming =

The Brazilian records in swimming are the fastest ever performances of swimmers from Brazil, which are recognised and ratified by Brazil's national swimming federation: Confederação Brasileira de Desportos Aquáticos (CBDA).

All records were set in finals unless noted otherwise.

The stroke names in Portuguese are:

- freestyle = livre
- backstroke = costas
- breaststroke = peito
- butterfly = borboleta
- medley = medley

== Long Course (50 m) ==
=== Men ===
Event	Time		Name	Club	Date	Meet	Location	Ref
50 m freestyle	20.91	AM	César Cielo Filho	EC Pinheiros	18 December 2009	Brazilian Open	São Paulo, Brazil	
100 m freestyle	46.91		César Cielo Filho	Brazil	30 July 2009	World Championships	Rome, Italy	
200 m freestyle	1:44.66		Fernando Scheffer	Brazil	27 July 2021	Olympic Games	Tokyo, Japan	
400 m freestyle	3:42.76	AM	Guilherme Costa	Brazil	27 July 2024	Olympic Games	Paris, France	
800 m freestyle	7:45.48		Guilherme Costa	Brazil	21 June 2022	World Championships	Budapest, Hungary	
1500 m freestyle	14:48.53		Guilherme Costa	Brazil	25 June 2022	World Championships	Budapest, Hungary	
50 m backstroke	24.44		Daniel Orzechowski	EC Pinheiros	24 April 2012	Maria Lenk Trophy	Rio de Janeiro, Brazil	
100 m backstroke	52.95	h	Guilherme Guido	Brazil	22 July 2019	World Championships	Gwangju, South Korea	
200 m backstroke	1:57.00	h	Leonardo de Deus	Brazil	10 August 2016	Olympic Games	Rio de Janeiro, Brazil	
50 m breaststroke	26.33	AM	Felipe Lima	Brazil	9 June 2019	Mare Nostrum	Monte Carlo, Monaco	
100 m breaststroke	59.01	h	Felipe França Silva	Brazil	6 August 2016	Olympic Games	Rio de Janeiro, Brazil	
200 m breaststroke	2:08.44		Henrique Barbosa	EC Pinheiros	6 May 2009	Maria Lenk Trophy	Rio de Janeiro, Brazil	
50m butterfly	22.60		Nicholas Santos	Brazil	11 May 2019	Champions Swim Series	Budapest, Hungary	
100m butterfly	51.02	sf	Gabriel Mangabeira	Brazil	31 July 2009	World Championships	Rome, Italy	
200m butterfly	1:53.92	h	Kaio de Almeida	Unattached	8 May 2009	Maria Lenk Trophy	Rio de Janeiro, Brazil	
200m individual medley	1:55.55		Thiago Pereira	Brazil	30 July 2009	World Championships	Rome, Italy	
400m individual medley	4:08.86	=	Thiago Pereira	Brazil	30 July 2009	World Championships	Rome, Italy	
400m individual medley	4:08.86	=	Thiago Pereira	Brazil	28 July 2012	Olympic Games	London, Great Britain	
4×50m freestyle relay	1:26.12		Nicholas Santos (21.66); César Cielo Filho (20.92); Bruno Fratus (21.58); Nicolas Oliveira (21.96)	EC Pinheiros	18 December 2009	Maria Lenk Trophy	São Paulo, Brazil	
4×100m freestyle relay	3:10.34		Gabriel Santos (48.30); Marcelo Chierighini (46.85); César Cielo Filho (48.01); Bruno Fratus (47.18)	Brazil	23 July 2017	World Championships	Budapest, Hungary	
4×200m freestyle relay	7:04.69		Fernando Scheffer (1:45.52); Vinicius Assunção (1:46.44); Murilo Sartori (1:46.34); Breno Correia (1:46.39)	Brazil	23 June 2022	World Championships	Budapest, Hungary	
4×50m medley relay	1:40.33		Henrique Rodrigues; Thiago Parravicini; Nicholas Santos; César Cielo	CR Flamengo	11 June 2011	Rio de Janeiro's State championship	Rio de Janeiro, Brazil	
4×100m medley relay	3:29.16		Guilherme Guido (53.78); Henrique Barbosa (58.68); Gabriel Mangabeira (50.48); César Cielo Filho (46.22)	Brazil	2 August 2009	World Championships	Rome, Italy	

Legend: # – Record awaiting ratification by CBDA; WR – World record; AM – Americas record;
Records not set in finals: h – heat; sf – semifinal; r – relay 1st leg; rh – relay heat 1st leg; b – B final; † – en route to final mark; so – swim-off; tt – time trial

=== Women ===
Event	Time		Name	Club	Date	Meet	Location	Ref
50m freestyle	24.45	sf	Etiene Medeiros	Brazil	12 August 2016	Olympic Games	Rio de Janeiro, Brazil	
100m freestyle	53.87		Stephanie Balduccini	Unisanta	23 April 2025	Maria Lenk Trophy	Rio de Janeiro, Brazil	
200m freestyle	1:56.06	r	Maria Fernanda Costa	Brazil	1 August 2024	Olympic Games	Paris, France	
400m freestyle	4:02.86		Maria Fernanda Costa	Brazil	11 February 2024	World Championships	Doha, Qatar	
800m freestyle	8:23.98		Maria Fernanda Costa	Brazil	6 April 2026	Australian Open	Gold Coast, Australia	
1500m freestyle	16:01.95	h	Beatriz Dizotti	Brazil	24 July 2023	World Championships	Fukuoka, Japan	
50m backstroke	27.14		Etiene Medeiros	Brazil	27 July 2017	World Championships	Budapest, Hungary	
100m backstroke	59.61		Etiene Medeiros	Brazil	17 July 2015	Pan American Games	Toronto, Canada	
200m backstroke	2:11.95		Fernanda de Goeij	Brazil	7 August 2019	Pan American Games	Lima, Peru	
50m breaststroke	30.28	sf	Jhennifer Conceição	Brazil	24 June 2022	World Championships	Budapest, Hungary	
100m breaststroke	1:07.12		Jhennifer Conceição	EC Pinheiros	4 April 2022	Brazil Swimming Trophy	Rio de Janeiro, Brazil	
200m breaststroke	2:25.18	h	Gabrielle Assis	Brazil	27 July 2023	World Championships	Fukuoka, Japan	
50m butterfly	25.85	sf	Daynara de Paula	Brazil	31 July 2009	World Championships	Rome, Italy	
100m butterfly	56.94		Gabriella Silva	Brazil	27 July 2009	World Championships	Rome, Italy	
200m butterfly	2:09.22		Joanna Maranhão	Unisanta	4 May 2017	Maria Lenk Trophy	Rio de Janeiro, Brazil	
200m individual medley	2:11.24	sf	Joanna Maranhão	Brazil	23 July 2017	World Championships	Budapest, Hungary	
400m individual medley	4:38.07		Joanna Maranhão	Brazil	16 July 2015	Pan American Games	Toronto, Canada	
4×50m freestyle relay	1:40.63		Flávia Delaroli; Julyana Kury; Michelle Lenhardt; Tatiana Lemos	EC Pinheiros	3 September 2009	José Finkel Trophy	Palhoça, Brazil	
4×100m freestyle relay	3:37.39		Larissa Oliveira (54.67); Graciele Herrmann (54.72); Etiene Medeiros (53.99); Daynara de Paula (54.01)	Brazil	14 July 2015	Pan American Games	Toronto, Canada	
4×200m freestyle relay	7:52.71		Maria Fernanda Costa (1:57.30); Stephanie Balduccini (1:57.64); Aline Rodrigues (1:59.73); Gabrielle Roncatto (1:58.04)	Brazil	15 February 2024	World Championships	Doha, Qatar	
4×50m medley relay	1:58.27		Gisele Pereira; Julyana Kury; Monique Ferreira; Michelle Lenhardt	EC Pinheiros	11 September 2009	XII Mercosul Cup	Curitiba, Brazil	
4×100m medley relay	3:58.49	sf	Fabíola Molina (1:00.08); Carolina Mussi (1:08.31); Gabriella Silva (56.25); Tatiana Lemos (53.85)	Brazil	1 August 2009	World Championships	Rome, Italy	

Legend: # – Record awaiting ratification by CBDA; WR – World record; AM – Americas record;
Records not set in finals: h – heat; sf – semifinal; r – relay 1st leg; rh – relay heat 1st leg; b – B final; † – en route to final mark; so – swim-off; tt – time trial

=== Mixed relay ===
Event	Time	Name	Club	Date	Meet	Location	Ref
4×100 m freestyle relay	3:23.78	Guilherme Caribé (48.26); Marcelo Chierighini (47.59); Ana Vieira (54.50); Stephanie Balduccini (53.43)	Brazil	22 October 2023	Pan American Games	Santiago, Chile	
4×100 m medley relay	3:45.51	Guilherme Basseto (53.68); Felipe Lima (59.03); Giovanna Diamante (59.10); Larissa Oliveira (53.70)	Brazil	25 April 2021	Brazilian Olympic Selection Trials	Rio de Janeiro, Brazil	

Legend: # – Record awaiting ratification by CBDA; WR – World record; AM – Americas record;
Records not set in finals: h – heat; so – swim-off

== Short Course (25 m) ==
=== Men ===
Event	Time		Name	Club	Date	Meet	Location	Ref
50m freestyle	20.51		César Cielo Filho	Brazil	17 December 2010	World Championships	Dubai, United Arab Emirates	
100m freestyle	45.47		Guilherme Caribé	Brazil	12 December 2024	World Championships	Budapest, Hungary	
200m freestyle	1:41.32		Fernando Scheffer	Minas TC	16 September 2022	José Finkel Trophy	Recife, Brazil	
400m freestyle	3:37.46		Leonardo Alcantara	Minas TC	31 August 2026	José Finkel Trophy	São Paulo, Brazil	
800m freestyle	7:37.47		Leonardo Alcantara	Minas TC	4 September 2026	José Finkel Trophy	São Paulo, Brazil	
1500m freestyle	14:39.42		Guilherme Costa	Unisanta	14 September 2022	José Finkel Trophy	Recife, Brazil	
50m backstroke	22.55		Guilherme Guido	London Roar	26 October 2019	International Swimming League	Budapest, Hungary	
100m backstroke	48.95		Guilherme Guido	London Roar	3 September 2021	International Swimming League	Naples, Italy	
200m backstroke	1:50.97		Pedro Souza	Minas TC	1 September 2026	José Finkel Trophy	São Paulo, Brazil	
50m breaststroke	25.63		Felipe França Silva	EC Pinheiros	7 December 2014	World Championships	Doha, Qatar	
100m breaststroke	56.25		Felipe França Silva	EC Pinheiros	4 September 2014	José Finkel Trophy	Guaratinguetá, Brazil	
200m breaststroke	2:02.58		Thiago Simon	Corinthians	13 September 2016	José Finkel Trophy	Santos, Brazil	
50m butterfly	21.75		Nicholas Santos	Brazil	6 October 2018	World Cup	Budapest, Hungary	
100m butterfly	49.44		Kaio Almeida	Tijuca TC	11 November 2009	World Cup	Stockholm, Sweden	
200m butterfly	1:49.11		Kaio Almeida	Tijuca TC	10 November 2009	World Cup	Stockholm, Sweden	
100m individual medley	51.35		Caio Pumputis	Brazil	13 December 2024	World Championships	Budapest, Hungary	
200m individual medley	1:52.06		Leonardo Coelho Santos	Team Iron	15 November 2020	International Swimming League	Budapest, Hungary	
400m individual medley	4:00.63		Thiago Pereira	Minas TC	17 November 2007	World Cup	Berlin, Germany	
4×50m freestyle relay	1:25.28	AM	César Cielo Filho (20.81); Nicholas Santos (21.01); Bernardo Novaes (21.65); Thiago Sickert (21.81)	CR Flamengo	20 August 2012	José Finkel Trophy	São Paulo, Brazil	
4×100m freestyle relay	3:04.84		Marco Antonio Ferreira (46.44); Guilherme Caribé (45.79); Kaique Alves (45.82); Leonardo Coelho Santos (46.79)	Brazil	10 December 2024	World Championships	Budapest, Hungary	
4×200m freestyle relay	6:46.81		Luiz Altamir Melo (1:42.03); Fernando Scheffer (1:40.99); Leonardo Coelho Santos (1:42.81); Breno Correia (1:40.98)	Brazil	14 December 2018	World Championships	Hangzhou, China	
4×50m medley relay	1:30.51		Guilherme Guido (23.42); Felipe França Silva (25.33); Nicholas Santos (21.68); César Cielo Filho (20.08)	Brazil	4 December 2014	World Championships	Doha, Qatar	
4×100m medley relay	3:21.14		Guilherme Guido (50.11); Felipe França Silva (56.73); Marcos Macedo (49.63); César Cielo Filho (44.67)	Brazil	7 December 2014	World Championships	Doha, Qatar	

Legend: # – Record awaiting ratification by CBDA; WR – World record; AM – Americas record;
Records not set in finals: h – heat; sf – semifinal; r – relay 1st leg; rh – relay heat 1st leg; b – B final; † – en route to final mark; so – swim-off; tt – time trial

=== Women ===
Event	Time		Name	Club	Date	Meet	Location	Ref
50 m freestyle	23.76		Etiene Medeiros	Brazil	16 December 2018	World Championships	Hangzhou, China	
100 m freestyle	52.45		Larissa Oliveira	EC Pinheiros	26 August 2018	José Finkel Trophy	São Paulo, Brazil	
200 m freestyle	1:53.65		Maria Fernanda Costa	Unisanta	3 September 2026	José Finkel Trophy	São Paulo, Brazil	
400 m freestyle	3:59.33		Maria Fernanda Costa	Unisanta	13 August 2024	José Finkel Trophy	Florianópolis, Brazil	
800 m freestyle	8:19.57		Viviane Jungblut	GNU	14 September 2016	José Finkel Trophy	Santos, Brazil	
1500 m freestyle	15:48.82		Beatriz Dizotti	Brazil	29 October 2022	World Cup	Toronto, Canada	
50 m backstroke	25.67		Etiene Medeiros	Brazil	7 December 2014	World Championships	Doha, Qatar	
100 m backstroke	57.13	sf	Etiene Medeiros	Brazil	3 December 2014	World Championships	Doha, Qatar	
200 m backstroke	2:07.30		Alexia Assunção	SESI-SP	14 September 2022	José Finkel Trophy	Recife, Brazil	
50m breaststroke	29.87		Jhennifer Conceição	EC Pinheiros	15 September 2022	José Finkel Trophy	Recife, Brazil	
100m breaststroke	1:05.69		Jhennifer Conceição	EC Pinheiros	24 August 2018	José Finkel Trophy	São Paulo, Brazil	
200m breaststroke	2:20.98		Gabrielle Assis	Flamengo	10 December 2025	Rio de Janeiro State championships	Rio de Janeiro, Brazil	
50m butterfly	25.15		Giulia Carvalho	Minas TC	3 September 2026	José Finkel Trophy	São Paulo, Brazil	
100m butterfly	56.06		Giulia Carvalho	Minas TC	31 August 2026	José Finkel Trophy	São Paulo, Brazil	
200m butterfly	2:04.01		Joanna Maranhão	Minas TC	7 November 2009	World Cup	Moscow, Russia	
100m individual medley	59.42		Giulia Carvalho	Minas TC	4 September 2026	José Finkel Trophy	São Paulo, Brazil	
200m individual medley	2:09.03		Joanna Maranhão	Minas TC	6 November 2009	World Cup	Moscow, Russia	
400m individual medley	4:26.98		Joanna Maranhão	Minas TC	7 November 2009	World Cup	Moscow, Russia	
4×50m freestyle relay	1:38.78		Daiane Oliveira (25.11); Larissa Oliveira (24.18); Alessandra Marchioro (24.87); Daynara de Paula (24.62)	Brazil	7 December 2014	World Championships	Doha, Qatar	
4×100m freestyle relay	3:33.93		Larissa Oliveira (53.46); Daynara de Paula (53.88); Daiane Oliveira (53.03); Alessandra Marchioro (53.56)	Brazil	5 December 2014	World Championships	Doha, Qatar	
4×200m freestyle relay	7:46.76		Maria Fernanda Costa (1:54.22); Gabrielle Roncatto (1:57.34); Fernanda Celidônio (1:57.18); Letícia Romão (1:58.12)	Brazil	12 December 2024	World Championships	Budapest, Hungary	
4×50m medley relay	1:46.47		Etiene Medeiros (26.03); Ana Carla Carvalho (30.38); Daynara de Paula (25.68); Larissa Oliveira (24.38)	Brazil	5 December 2014	World Championships	Doha, Qatar	
4×100m medley relay	3:57.66		Fabíola Molina (59.19); Beatriz Travalon (1:07.46); Daynara de Paula (57.69); Larissa Oliveira (53.32)	Brazil	14 December 2012	World Championships	Istanbul, Turkey	

Legend: # – Record awaiting ratification by CBDA; WR – World record; AM – Americas record;
Records not set in finals: h – heat; sf – semifinal; r – relay 1st leg; rh – relay heat 1st leg; b – B final; † – en route to final mark; so – swim-off; tt – time trial

=== Mixed relay ===
Event	Time	Name	Club	Date	Meet	Location	Ref
4×50 m freestyle relay	1:29.17	César Cielo (20.65); João de Lucca (21.03); Etiene Medeiros (23.58); Larissa Oliveira (23.91)	Brazil	6 December 2014	World Championships	Doha, Qatar	
4×50 m medley relay	1:37.26	Etiene Medeiros (25.83); Felipe França Silva (25.45); Nicholas Santos (21.81); Larissa Oliveira (24.17)	Brazil	4 December 2014	World Championships	Doha, Qatar	

Legend: # – Record awaiting ratification by CBDA;
Records not set in finals: h – heat; so – swim-off
