= Gabriella Silva =

Brazilian swimmer

Personal information
- Full name: Gabriella Machado e Silva
- Nationality: Brazil
- Born: December 13, 1988 (age 37) Rio de Janeiro, Brazil
- Height: 1.66 m (5 ft 5 in)
- Weight: 53 kg (117 lb)

Sport
- Sport: Swimming
- Strokes: Butterfly
- Club: EC Pinheiros
Medal record
Pan American Games
Bronze medal – third place	2007 Rio	100 m fly

Gabriella Machado e Silva (born December 12, 1988, in Rio de Janeiro, Brazil) is a Brazilian butterfly swimmer and Olympian. As of October 2008, she was the South American and Brazilian record holder in the long-course 100-metre butterfly.

At the 2007 Pan American Games, in Rio de Janeiro, Gabriella won the bronze medal in the 100-metre butterfly. She also won bronze in the 4×100-metre medley by participate in heats, but, subsequently, this result was impeached due to Rebeca Gusmao's doping.

Gabriella competed at the 2008 Olympics in Beijing, where she finished 7th in the Women's 100-metre butterfly, and was a member of Brazil's women's 4×100-metre medley Relay which finished 10th.

At the 2009 World Aquatics Championships in Rome, Gabriella Silva finished in 5th place in the 100-metre butterfly, getting the best placement of a Brazilian woman in the World Championships. She was also a finalist in the 4×100-metre medley, finishing in 8th place and finished 13th place in the 50-metre butterfly.

She was at the 2010 Pan Pacific Swimming Championships in Irvine, where she finished 5th in the 50-metre butterfly, and 15th in the 100-metre butterfly.

At the 2011 Pan American Games, in Guadalajara, Gabriella finished 10th in the 100-metre butterfly, not going to the final.

== Early Retirement ==
After the 2009 World Aquatics Championships in Rome, she did two operations on her shoulders to fix a "looseness in the joint capsule of the left shoulder" (congenital), and never managed to get good results as before. So, in January 2013, at age 24, defeated by the pains and injuries, she announced her retirement.

== Records ==
Long course (50 meters)

- Former South American record holder at 50m butterfly: 26.02, obtained on July 31, 2009
- South American record holder at 100m butterfly: 56.94, obtained on July 27, 2009
- South American record holder at 4 × 100 m medley: 3:58.49 obtained on August 1, 2009, with Fabiola Molina, Carolina Mussi and Tatiana Lemos

Short course (25 meters)

- Former South American record holder at 100m butterfly: 58.75, obtained on November 15, 2008
- South American record holder at 50m butterfly: 25.93 obtained on September 12, 2010

== See also ==
- List of South American records in swimming
- List of Brazilian records in swimming
