= Confederación Sudamericana de Natación =

South American Swimming Confederation

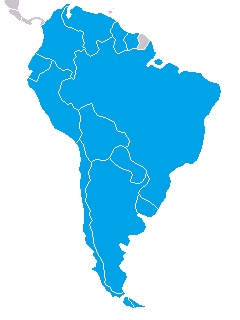
Members of Consanat.

Confederación Sudamericana de Natación (CONSANAT) is the South American Swimming Confederation, which oversees international aquatics competitions among South American countries. It is affiliated to World Aquatics, the international federation for swimming, via PanAm Aquatics, the swimming continental association for the Americas.

CONSANAT formed on March 16, 1929 in Santiago, Chile. Its office is currently located in Rio de Janeiro, Brazil.

CONSANAT organizes South American aquatics championships in diving, swimming, open water swimming, synchronized swimming, and water polo. It also maintains the South American Records and South American Junior Records.

== Member National Federations ==
- Argentina
- Bolivia
- Brazil
- Colombia
- Chile
- Ecuador
- Guyana
- Paraguay
- Peru
- Suriname
- Uruguay
- Venezuela

Note: As French Guiana is an overseas department of France, it is not a CONSANAT member. Rather, it is a department of the French Swimming Federation.

== Competitions ==
CONSANAT organizes several South American aquatics championships, including:

- South American Aquatics Championships (all 5 disciplines) : in the even years between Summer Olympics, these are the aquatics competitions at the South American Games.
- South American Masters Aquatics Championships (in even years).
- South American Juniors Aquatics Championships (in odd years).
