= Jhennifer Conceição =

Brazilian swimmer (born 1997)

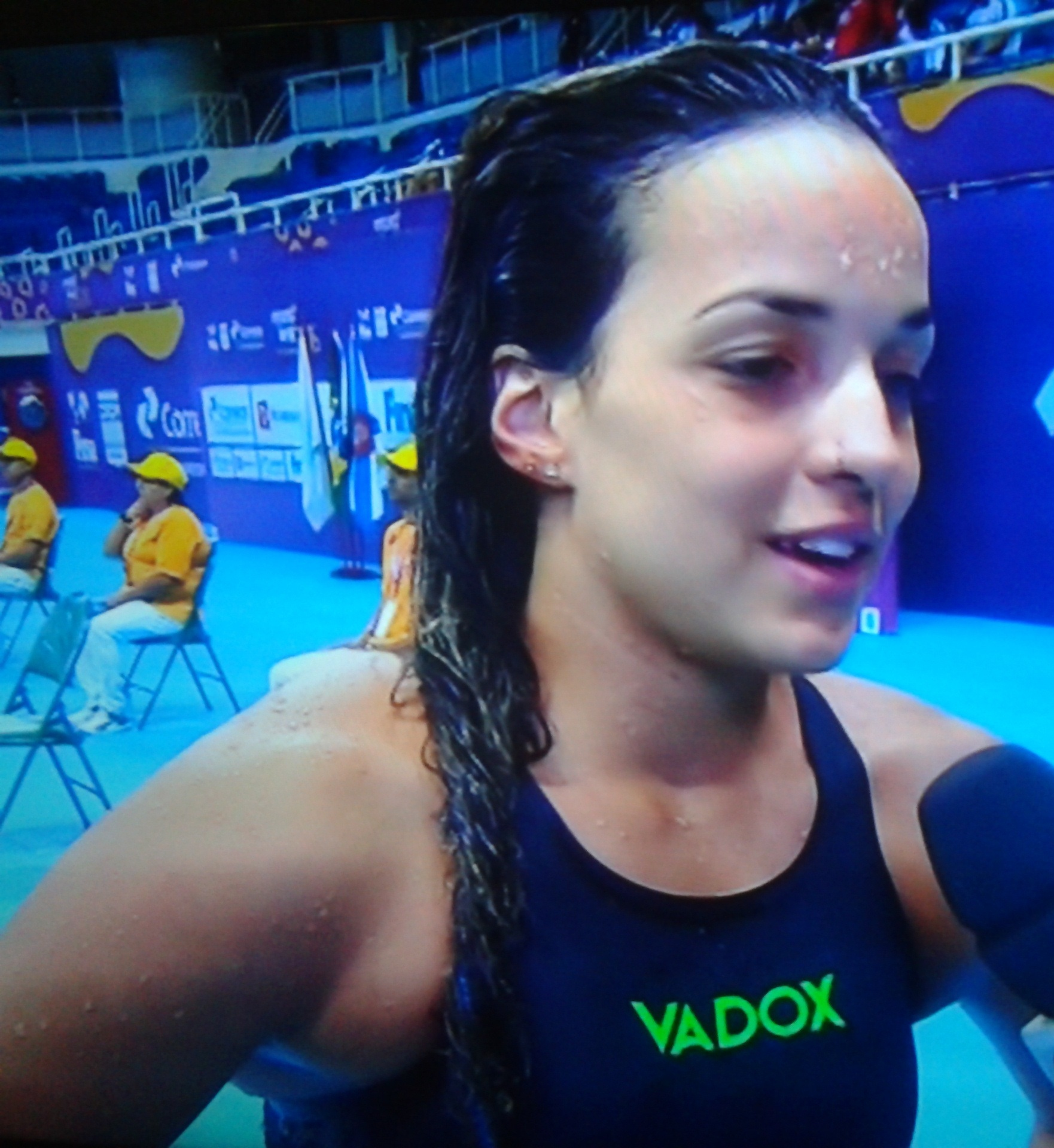
- (2016)

Personal information
- Full name: Jhennifer Alves da Conceição
- Nationality: Brazil
- Born: June 13, 1997 (age 29) Nova Friburgo, Rio de Janeiro, Brazil
- Height: 1.62 m (5 ft 4 in)
- Weight: 52 kg (115 lb)

Sport
- Sport: Swimming
- Strokes: Breaststroke
Medal record
Women's swimming
Representing Brazil
Pan American Games
Gold medal – first place	2019 Lima	4×100 m mixed medley
Bronze medal – third place	2015 Toronto	4x100 m medley
Bronze medal – third place	2019 Lima	4×100 m medley
Bronze medal – third place	2023 Santiago	4×100 m mixed medley
South American Games
Gold medal – first place	2022 Asunción	50 m breaststroke
Gold medal – first place	2022 Asunción	4×100 m medley
Bronze medal – third place	2022 Asunción	100 m breaststroke
Universiade
Gold medal – first place	2019 Naples	50 m breaststroke
Bronze medal – third place	2021 Chengdu	50 m breaststroke

Jhennifer Alves da Conceição (born June 13, 1997, in Nova Friburgo) is a Brazilian swimmer. Finalist at the 2022 World Championships in the 50m breaststroke.

== International career ==
=== 2015–2016 ===
At the 2015 South American Swimming Youth Championships, held in Lima, Peru, Conceição won two gold medals in the 100-metre breaststroke, and in the 4x50-metre medley relay.

At the 2015 Pan American Games in Toronto, Ontario, Canada, Conceição won a bronze medal in the 4 × 100 metre medley relay, along with Etiene Medeiros, Daynara de Paula and Larissa Oliveira. She also went to the 100 metre breaststroke, where she classified 5th in the heats, but was disqualified in the final.

At the 2015 World Aquatics Championships in Kazan, she finished 14th in the Women's 4 × 100 metre medley relay, 21st in the Women's 50 metre breaststroke, and 36th in the Women's 100 metre breaststroke.

=== 2016 Summer Olympics ===
At the 2016 Summer Olympics, she competed in the Women's 4 × 100 metre medley relay, finishing 13th.

=== 2017–2020 ===
On September 15, 2016, at the José Finkel Trophy (short course competition), she broke the South American record in the 50-metre breaststroke, with a time of 30.31.

On 4 May 2017, at the Maria Lenk Trophy tournament held in Rio de Janeiro, she broke the South American record in the 50-metre breaststroke, with a time of 30.63.

On 7 December 2017, at the Open tournament held in Rio de Janeiro, she broke the South American record in the 50-metre breaststroke, with a time of 30.51.

In August 2018, at the José Finkel Trophy (short course competition), she broke the South American record in the 50-metre breaststroke, with a time of 30.00, and in the 100-metre breaststroke, with a time of 1:05.69 .

In April 2019, at the 2019 Brazil Trophy, she broke two times the South American record in the 50-metre breaststroke: 30.50 at heats, and 30.47 in the final.

On 21 June 2019, at the 2019 Sette Coli in Rome, she broke the South American record in the 100-metre breaststroke, with a time of 1:07.64.

At the 2019 Pan American Games held in Lima, Peru, she won a gold medal in the Mixed 4 × 100 metre medley relay (by participating at heats), and a bronze medal in the Women's 4 × 100 metre medley relay. She also finished 5th in the Women's 100 metre breaststroke.

On 16 November 2020, at the 2020 International Swimming League, she broke the South American record in the 50-metre breaststroke (short course), with a time of 29.91.

=== 2021–2024 ===
On 26 June 2021, at the Sette Colli Trophy, she broke the South American record in the 50-metre breaststroke, with a time of 30.40.

At the 2021 FINA World Swimming Championships (25 m) in Abu Dhabi, United Arab Emirates, she finished 9th in the Women's 50 metre breaststroke.

At the 2022 World Aquatics Championships held in Budapest, she qualified for the Women's 50 metre breaststroke final with a time of 30.28, a new South American record. She finished 8th in the final, being the first time that a South American woman reached the final of this event in World Championships.

On 15 September 2022, at the José Finkel Trophy in Recife, she broke the short course South American record in the 50-metre breaststroke, with a time of 29.87.
