= 2007 FINA Swimming World Cup =

The 2007 FINA Swimming World Cup occurred in autumn 2007. It was an international series of short course (25m) swimming competitions organised by FINA.

The 2007 edition marked a return to all World Cup meets being held in the same year for a given series, with them all held within October and November 2007. Swimmers from FINA members were allowed to compete.

== Venues ==
Dates	Venue	Location	Results
20 + 21 October 2007	Kings Park Aquatic Complex	Durban, South Africa	results
27 + 28 October 2007	Singapore Sports School Swimming Complex	Singapore	results
2 + 3 November 2007	Sydney International Aquatic Centre	Sydney, Australia	results
9 + 10 November 2007	Olympiiski Swimming Pool	Moscow, Russia	results
13 + 14 November 2007	Eriksdalsbadet	Stockholm, Sweden	results
17 + 18 November 2007	Europasportpark	Berlin, Germany	results
23–25 November 2007	Minas Tênis Clube	Belo Horizonte, Brazil	

== Competition programme ==
The event schedule for all meets was the same: a 2-day format, all events both day with men swimming half and females the other half (genders switch events for the second day, thereby swimming all events per gender). All events are short course (25m) format, and all are prelims/finals except for the women's 800 free and men's 1500 free which are timed finals (swum just once). For meets 1–6, prelims and finals were the same day; for meet 7 (Belo Horizonte), prelims were held in the afternoon with finals the next morning (causing its 3-dates for the meet).

Event order

Day 1

- 800 m freestyle women
- 100 m freestyle men
- 200 m freestyle women
- 50 m breaststroke men
- 100 m breaststroke women
- 400 m IM men
- 100 m butterfly women
- 100 m backstroke men
- 50 m backstroke women
- 200 m butterfly men
- 200 m IM women
- 400 m freestyle men
- 50 m freestyle women
- 200 m breaststroke men
- 100 m IM men
- 200 m backstroke women
- 50 m butterfly men

Day 2

- 1500 m freestyle men
- 100 m freestyle women
- 200 m freestyle men
- 50 m breaststroke women
- 100 m breaststroke men
- 400 m IM women
- 100 m butterfly men
- 100 m backstroke women
- 50 m backstroke men
- 200 m butterfly women
- 200 m IM men
- 400 m freestyle women
- 50 m freestyle men
- 200 m breaststroke women
- 100 m IM women
- 200 m backstroke men
- 50 m butterfly women

== Event winners ==
WR denotes World Record, WC denotes World Cup Record.
Time listed in header is the series record at the start of the 2007 World Cup.

=== 50m Freestyle ===
Men		Meet	Women	
Winner (Nationality) WC: Mark Foster, GBR	Time 21.13	Meet	Winner (Nationality) WC: Lisbeth Lenton, AUS	Time 23.85
Gerhard Zandberg (South Africa)	21.59	#1: Durban	Therese Alshammar (Sweden)	24.17
Roland Schoeman (South Africa)	21.61	#2: Singapore	Therese Alshammar (Sweden)	24.02
Eamon Sullivan (Australia)	21.52	#3: Sydney	Lisbeth Lenton (Australia)	23.98
Eamon Sullivan (Australia)	21.31	#4: Moscow	Therese Alshammar (Sweden)	24.21
Stefan Nystrand (Sweden)	21.16	#5: Stockholm	Therese Alshammar (Sweden)	23.79 WC
Stefan Nystrand (Sweden)	20.93 WR	#6: Berlin	Marleen Veldhuis (Netherlands)	23.58 WR
Roland Schoeman (South Africa)	21.38	#7: Belo Horizonte	Therese Alshammar (Sweden)	24.23

=== 100m Freestyle ===
Men		Meet	Women	
Winner (Nationality) WC: Roland Schoeman, RSA	Time 46.25	Meet	Winner (Nationality) WC: Lisbeth Lenton, AUS	Time 52.17
Roland Schoeman (South Africa)	47.40	#1: Durban	Josefin Lillhage (Sweden)	53.53
Roland Schoeman (South Africa)	47.34	#2: Singapore	Therese Alshammar (Sweden)	53.67
Eamon Sullivan (Australia)	47.15	#3: Sydney	Lisbeth Lenton (Australia)	52.20
Stefan Nystrand (Sweden)	46.60	#4: Moscow	Josefin Lillhage (Sweden)	53.66
Stefan Nystrand (Sweden)	46.48	#5: Stockholm	Marleen Veldhuis (Netherlands)	52.30
Stefan Nystrand (Sweden)	45.83 WR	#6: Berlin	Marleen Veldhuis (Netherlands)	52.14 WC
Roland Schoeman (South Africa)	46.85	#7: Belo Horizonte	Josefin Lillhage (Sweden)	53.81

=== 200m Freestyle ===
Men		Meet	Women	
Winner (Nationality) WC: Ian Thorpe, AUS	Time 1:41.10	Meet	Winner (Nationality) WC: Lisbeth Lenton, AUS	Time 1:53.29
Kyle Richardson (Australia)	1:46.88	#1: Durban	Josefin Lillhage (Sweden)	1:55.40
Kenrick Monk (Australia)	1:45.54	#2: Singapore	Melissa Corfe (South Africa)	1:57.77
Park Tae-Hwan (South Korea)	1:43.38	#3: Sydney	Lisbeth Lenton (Australia)	1:54.22
Romāns Miloslavskis (Latvia)	1:45.77	#4: Moscow	Josefin Lillhage (Sweden)	1:55.53
Park Tae-Hwan (South Korea)	1:43.87	#5: Stockholm	Josefin Lillhage (Sweden)	1:54.59
Park Tae-Hwan (South Korea)	1:42.22	#6: Berlin	Laure Manaudou (France)	1:53.48
Rodrigo Castro (Brazil)	1:45.89	#7: Belo Horizonte	Josefin Lillhage (Sweden)	1:55.32

=== 400m Freestyle ===
Men		Meet	Women	
Winner (Nationality) WC: Ian Thorpe, AUS	Time 3:34.63	Meet	Winner (Nationality) WC: Lindsay Benko, USA	Time 3:59.53
Christian Kubusch (Germany)	3:44.53	#1: Durban	Josefin Lillhage (Sweden)	4:06.03
Kenrick Monk (Australia)	3:49.31	#2: Singapore	Melissa Corfe (South Africa)	4:09.61
Park Tae-Hwan (South Korea)	3:39.99	#3: Sydney	Bronte Barratt (Australia)	3:59.94
Yuri Prilukov (Russia)	3:42.20	#4: Moscow	Petra Dallman (Germany)	4:09.91
Park Tae-Hwan (South Korea)	3:42.14	#5: Stockholm	Lotte Friis (Denmark)	4:03.71
Park Tae-Hwan (South Korea)	3:36.68	#6: Berlin	Federica Pellegrini (Italy)	4:02.29
Adam Lucas (Australia)	3:51.88	#7: Belo Horizonte	Josefin Lillhage (Sweden)	4:11.50

=== 1500m/800m Freestyle ===
Men (1500 free)		Meet	Women (800 free)	
Winner (Nationality) WC: Grant Hackett, AUS	Time 14:29.51	Meet	Winner (Nationality) WC: Kate Ziegler, USA	Time 8:12.19
Christian Kubusch (Germany)	15:01.90	#1: Durban	Kathryn Meaklim (South Africa)	8:29.23
Matt Woodrow (New Zealand)	15:27.85	#2: Singapore	Yurie Yano (Japan)	8:28.67
Park Tae-Hwan (South Korea)	14:49.94	#3: Sydney	Kylie Palmer (Australia)	8:15.96
Mateusz Sawrymowicz (Poland)	14.37.28	#4: Moscow	Elena Sokolova (Russia)	8:34.78
Park Tae-Hwan (South Korea)	14:36.42	#5: Stockholm	Lotte Friis (Denmark)	8:20.63
Park Tae-Hwan (South Korea)	14:34.39	#6: Berlin	Alessia Filippi (Italy)	8:16.35
Luiz Rogerio Arapiraca (Brazil)	15:19.32	#7: Belo Horizonte	Mariana Brochado (Brazil)	8:51.60

=== 50m Backstroke ===
Men		Meet	Women	
Winner (Nationality) WC: Matt Welsh, AUS Peter Marshall, USA	Time 23.39	Meet	Winner (Nationality) WC: LI Hui, CHN	Time 26.83
(United States) Randall Bal (USA)	23.79	#1: Durban	Antje Buschschulte (Germany)	27.53
(United States) Randall Bal (USA)	23.94	#2: Singapore	Sophie Edington (Australia)	27.62
(United States) Randall Bal (USA)	23.42	#3: Sydney	Tayliah Zimmer (Australia)	27.31
(United States) Randall Bal (USA)	23.50	#4: Moscow	Iryna Amshennikova (Ukraine)	28.12
(United States) Randall Bal (USA)	23.49	#5: Stockholm	Daniela Samulski (Germany)	27.52
(United States) Randall Bal (USA)	23.33 WC	#6: Berlin	Antje Buschschulte (Germany)	26.94
(United States) Randall Bal (USA)	23.62	#7: Belo Horizonte	Lize-Mari Retief (South Africa)	28.39

=== 100m Backstroke ===
Men		Meet	Women	
Winner (Nationality) WC: Thomas Rupprath, GER	Time 50.58	Meet	Winner (Nationality) WC: Natalie Coughlin, USA	Time 56.71
(United States) Randall Bal (USA)	51.13	#1: Durban	(United States) Natalie Coughlin (USA)	57.21
(United States) Randall Bal (USA)	50.91	#2: Singapore	(United States) Natalie Coughlin (USA)	56.51 WR
(United States) Randall Bal (USA)	50.78	#3: Sydney	(United Kingdom) Elizabeth Simmonds (Great Britain)	58.14
(United States) Randall Bal (USA)	50.99	#4: Moscow	Iryna Amshennikova (Ukraine)	59.17
(United States) Randall Bal (USA)	51.01	#5: Stockholm	Fabíola Molina (Brazil)	58.98
(United States) Randall Bal (USA)	50.66	#6: Berlin	Janine Pietsch (Germany)	58.34
(United States) Randall Bal (USA)	50.80	#7: Belo Horizonte	(United States) Natalie Coughlin (USA)	59.88

=== 200m Backstroke ===
Men		Meet	Women	
Winner (Nationality) WC: Markus Rogan, AUT	Time 1:50.67	Meet	Winner (Nationality) WC: Natalie Coughlin, USA	Time 2:03.62
(United States) Randall Bal (USA)	1:53.15	#1: Durban	Antje Buschschulte (Germany)	2:08.31
(United States) Randall Bal (USA)	1:52.88	#2: Singapore	Sophie Edington (Australia)	2:07.30
(United States) Randall Bal (USA)	1:51.78	#3: Sydney	(United Kingdom) Elizabeth Simmonds (Great Britain)	2:05.21
(United States) Randall Bal (USA)	1:52.39	#4: Moscow	Iryna Amshennikova (Ukraine)	2:07.39
(United States) Randall Bal (USA)	1:51.85	#5: Stockholm	Iryna Amshennikova (Ukraine)	2:07.30
(United States) Randall Bal (USA)	1:50.42 WC	#6: Berlin	Antje Buschschulte (Germany)	2:05.92
(United States) Randall Bal (USA)	1:53.18	#7: Belo Horizonte	Joanna Maranhão (Brazil)	2:13.16

=== 50m Breaststroke ===
Men		Meet	Women	
Winner (Nationality) WC: Oleg Lisogor, UKR	Time 26.17	Meet	Winner (Nationality) WC: Jade Edmistone, AUS	Time 30.13
Gerhard Zandberg (South Africa)	27.53	#1: Durban	Suzaan van Biljon (South Africa)	31.13
Roland Schoeman (South Africa)	27.45	#2: Singapore	Olivia Halicek (Australia)	31.27
Christian Sprenger (Australia)	27.12	#3: Sydney	Leisel Jones (Australia)	30.03 WC
Gerhard Zandberg (South Africa)	27.45	#4: Moscow	Yuliya Efimova (Russia)	30.80
Robin van Aggele (Netherlands)	27.19	#5: Stockholm	Yuliya Efimova (Russia)	30.42
Cameron van der Burgh (South Africa)	26.88	#6: Berlin	Yuliya Efimova (Russia)	30.29
Gerhard Zandberg (South Africa)	27.37	#7: Belo Horizonte	Tatiane Sakemi (Brazil)	32.17

=== 100m Breaststroke ===
Men		Meet	Women	
Winner (Nationality) WC: Ed Moses, USA	Time 57.47	Meet	Winner (Nationality) WC: Leisel Jones, AUS	Time 1:04.84
Cameron van der Burgh (South Africa)	1:00.33	#1: Durban	Suzaan van Biljon (South Africa)	1:06.67
Dmitry Komornikov (Russia)	1:00.15	#2: Singapore	Joline Höstman (Sweden)	1:07.41
Christian Sprenger (Australia)	58.71	#3: Sydney	Leisel Jones (Australia)	1:04.37 WC
Grigory Falko (Russia)	59.70	#4: Moscow	Yuliya Efimova (Russia)	1:07.52
Robin van Aggele (Netherlands)	59.14	#5: Stockholm	Yuliya Efimova (Russia)	1:05.41
Cameron van der Burgh (South Africa)	58.70	#6: Berlin	Sarah Poewe (Germany)	1:06.14
Eduardo Fischer (Brazil)	59.89	#7: Belo Horizonte	Tatiane Sakemi (Brazil)	1:08.98

=== 200m Breaststroke ===
Men		Meet	Women	
Winner (Nationality) WC: Ed Moses, USA	Time 2:02.92	Meet	Winner (Nationality) WC: Leisel Jones, AUS	Time 2:17.75
Cameron van der Burgh (South Africa)	2:11.37	#1: Durban	Suzaan van Biljon (South Africa)	2:25.54
William Diering (South Africa)	2:09.36	#2: Singapore	Joline Höstman (Sweden)	2:25.42
Christian Sprenger (Australia)	2:07.01	#3: Sydney	Leisel Jones (Australia)	2:20.84
Grigory Falko (Russia)	2:09.79	#4: Moscow	Yuliya Efimova (Russia)	2:25.08
Grigory Falko (Russia)	2:08.85	#5: Stockholm	Yuliya Efimova (Russia)	2:21.41
Grigory Falko (Russia)	2:08.60	#6: Berlin	Yuliya Efimova (Russia)	2:20.95
Jonas Andersson (Sweden)	2:13.19	#7: Belo Horizonte	Tatiane Mayumi Sakemi (Brazil)	2:31.37

=== 50m Butterfly ===
Men		Meet	Women	
Winner (Nationality) WC: Geoff Huegill, AUS	Time 22.74	Meet	Winner (Nationality) WC: Anna-Karin Kammerling, SWE	Time 25.36
Roland Schoeman (South Africa)	23.45	#1: Durban	Therese Alshammar (Sweden)	25.64
Nikolay Skvortsov (Russia)	23.48	#2: Singapore	Therese Alshammar (Sweden)	25.69
Evgeny Korotyshkin (Russia)	23.52	#3: Sydney	Lisbeth Lenton (Australia)	25.56
Nikolay Skvortsov (Russia)	23.28	#4: Moscow	Therese Alshammar (Sweden)	25.88
Roland Schoeman (South Africa)	23.14	#5: Stockholm	Therese Alshammar (Sweden)	25.54
Milorad Čavić (Serbia)	23.19	#6: Berlin	Therese Alshammar (Sweden)	25.47
Lyndon Ferns (South Africa)	23.40	#7: Belo Horizonte	Therese Alshammar (Sweden)	25.69

=== 100m Butterfly ===
Men		Meet	Women	
Winner (Nationality) WC: Thomas Rupprath, GER	Time 50.10	Meet	Winner (Nationality) WC: Natalie Coughlin, USA	Time 56.34
Gabriel Mangabeira (Brazil)	53.37	#1: Durban	(United States) Natalie Coughlin (USA)	57.52
Nikolay Skvortsov (Russia)	51.47	#2: Singapore	(United States) Natalie Coughlin (USA)	56.35
Nikolay Skvortsov (Russia)	51.07	#3: Sydney	Felicity Galvez (Australia)	57.63
Nikolay Skvortsov (Russia)	50.97	#4: Moscow	Martina Moravcová (Slovakia)	58.26
Andrew Lauterstein (Australia)	51.60	#5: Stockholm	Inge Dekker (Netherlands)	57.10
Milorad Čavić (Serbia)	51.07	#6: Berlin	Inge Dekker (Netherlands)	56.88
Fernando Silva (Brazil)	51.45	#7: Belo Horizonte	(United States) Natalie Coughlin (USA)	56.39

=== 200m Butterfly ===
Men		Meet	Women	
Winner (Nationality) WC: James Hickman, GBR	Time 1:51.76	Meet	Winner (Nationality) WC: YANG Yu, CHN	Time 2:04.04
Sebastien Rousseau (South Africa)	1:57.48	#1: Durban	Mandy Loots (South Africa)	2:07.14
Nikolay Skvortsov (Russia)	1:53.26	#2: Singapore	Yurie Yano (Japan)	2:08.26
Nikolay Skvortsov (Russia)	1:52.07	#3: Sydney	Felicity Galvez (Australia)	2:05.40
Nikolay Skvortsov (Russia)	1:50.74 WC	#4: Moscow	Otylia Jędrzejczak (Poland)	2:06.92
Paweł Korzeniowski (Poland)	1:53.19	#5: Stockholm	Audrey Lacroix (Canada)	2:04.53
CHEN Yin (China)	1:52.97	#6: Berlin	JIAO Liuyang (China)	2:04.48
Kaio Almeida (Brazil)	1:54.39	#7: Belo Horizonte	Keri-Leigh Shaw (South Africa)	2:10.39

=== 100m Individual Medley ===
Men		Meet	Women	
Winner (Nationality) WC: Ryk Neethling, RSA	Time 51.52	Meet	Winner (Nationality) WC: Natalie Coughlin, USA	Time 58.80
Gerhard Zandberg (South Africa)	53.93	#1: Durban	(United States) Natalie Coughlin (USA)	1:00.59
Roland Schoeman (South Africa)	53.87	#2: Singapore	(United States) Natalie Coughlin (USA)	59.12
(United Kingdom) Liam Tancock (Great Britain)	53.71	#3: Sydney	Hanna-Maria Seppälä (Finland)	1:00.73
Gerhard Zandberg (South Africa)	53.89	#4: Moscow	Aleksandra Urbanczyk (Poland)	1:01.12
Thiago Pereira (Brazil)	52.97	#5: Stockholm	Sophie de Ronchi (France)	1:00.81
Thiago Pereira (Brazil)	52.42	#6: Berlin	Laure Manaudou (France)	1:01.12
Roland Schoeman (South Africa)	53.13	#7: Belo Horizonte	(United States) Natalie Coughlin (USA)	59.81

=== 200m Individual Medley ===
Men		Meet	Women	
Winner (Nationality) WC: Michael Phelps, USA	Time 1:54.85	Meet	Winner (Nationality) WC: Yana Klochkova, UKR	Time 2:08.44
Wesley Gilchrist (South Africa)	2:00.16	#1: Durban	Mandy Loots (South Africa)	2:10.97
Mitchell Bacon (Australia)	1:59.40	#2: Singapore	Samantha Hamill (Australia)	2:12.04
(United Kingdom) Liam Tancock (Great Britain)	1:56.93	#3: Sydney	Stephanie Rice (Australia)	2:10.88
Alexander Tikhonov (Russia)	1:58.93	#4: Moscow	Katarzyna Baranowska (Poland)	2:09.63
Thiago Pereira (Brazil)	1:55.08	#5: Stockholm	Otylia Jędrzejczak (Poland)	2:10.06
Thiago Pereira (Brazil)	1:53.14 WR	#6: Berlin	Laure Manaudou (France)	2:09.27
Thiago Pereira (Brazil)	1:54.58	#7: Belo Horizonte	Joanna Maranhão (Brazil)	2:14.27

=== 400m Individual Medley ===
Men		Meet	Women	
Winner (Nationality) WC: Michael Phelps, USA	Time 4:03.99	Meet	Winner (Nationality) WC: Yana Klochkova, UKR	Time 4:27.83
Riaan Schoeman (South Africa)	4:13.62	#1: Durban	Zsuzsanna Jakabos (Hungary)	4:36.23
Mitchell Bacon (Australia)	4:16.68	#2: Singapore	Samantha Hamill (Australia)	4:37.90
Dean Kent (New Zealand)	4:11.15	#3: Sydney	Stephanie Rice (Australia)	4:32.63
Ilya Volovnik (Russia)	4:11.21	#4: Moscow	Katarzyna Baranowska (Poland)	4:32.63
Thiago Pereira (Brazil)	4:06.30	#5: Stockholm	Jessica Pengelly (South Africa)	4:38.27
Thiago Pereira (Brazil)	4:00.63 WC	#6: Berlin	Alessia Filippi (Italy)	4:30.25
Thiago Pereira (Brazil)	4:08.49	#7: Belo Horizonte	Joanna Maranhão (Brazil)	4:42.29
