= Brazil Swimming Trophy =

Brazilian swimming competition

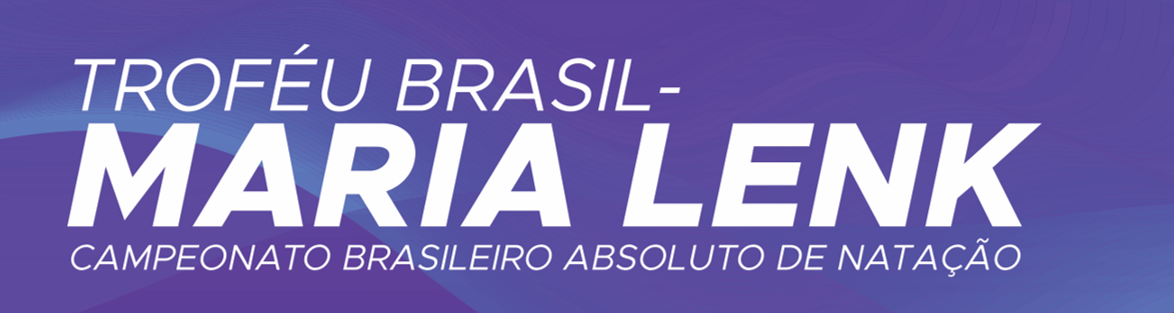

Tournament information
- Sport: Swimming
- Location: Brazil
- Established: 1962
- Number of tournaments: 58
- Administrator: CBDA
- Format: Team Competition by Points

Current champion
- Minas Tênis Clube

The Brazil Swimming Trophy (Formerly: Maria Lenk Trophy) is a Brazilian competition played by teams in individual and relay swimming events. It is also known as the Brazilian Open Summer Championship and / or Brazilian Open Long Course Pool Championship. It is one of the most notable events nationwide.

Its first edition took place in 1962 in Porto Alegre and had Club Athlético Paulistano as champion. The most recent edition took place in the city of Rio de Janeiro in December 2020. The trophy is marked by the hegemony of the clubs in the states of Rio de Janeiro, São Paulo and Minas Gerais. The main winners are: Esporte Clube Pinheiros with 18 titles, Clube de Regatas do Flamengo with 13, and Minas Tênis Clube with 10.

== History ==
=== 2012 ===
In 2012, the Clube de Regatas do Flamengo became champion, after a decade, with 2152.5 points. The Trophy was won after a fight with Esporte Clube Pinheiros (2070 points) and Sport Club Corinthians Paulista (1939.5 points), respectively, second and third places. Minas Tennis Club came in fourth (1812 points).

=== 2016 ===
In 2016, the Brazil Swimming Trophy was used as test event for the 2016 Summer Olympics. In the event, aquatic timing systems, swimming pools, ventilation systems and the infrastructure of the Olympic Aquatic Stadium in Barra da Tijuca could be tested.

=== 2020 ===
In 2020, the Brazil Swimming Trophy was the first national event to happen following the onset of the COVID-19 pandemic. Originally the championship should have been held in April, but it had to be postponed to December to comply with sanitary measures imposed by Brazilian government entities.

== Champion by Year ==
Year	Champion	City
1962	Club Athlético Paulistano	Porto Alegre
1963	Club Athlético Paulistano	Rio de Janeiro
1964	Sport Club Corinthians Paulista	Belo Horizonte
1965	Sport Club Corinthians Paulista	São Paulo
1966	Sport Club Corinthians Paulista	Porto Alegre
1967	Botafogo de Futebol e Regatas	Rio de Janeiro
1968	Clube de Regatas do Flamengo	Belo Horizonte
1969	Fluminense Football Club	São Paulo
1970	Fluminense Football Club	Porto Alegre
1971	Botafogo de Futebol e Regatas	Rio de Janeiro
1972	Botafogo de Futebol e Regatas	Juiz de Fora
1973	Botafogo de Futebol e Regatas	São Paulo
1974	Botafogo de Futebol e Regatas	Salvador
1975	Fluminense Football Club	Rio de Janeiro
1976	Fluminense Football Club	São Paulo
1977	Esporte Clube Pinheiros	Belo Horizonte
1978	Fluminense Football Club	Rio de Janeiro
1979	Esporte Clube Pinheiros	Mogi das Cruzes
1980	Clube de Regatas do Flamengo	Rio de Janeiro
1981	Clube de Regatas do Flamengo	Rio de Janeiro
1982	Clube de Regatas do Flamengo	São Paulo
1983	Clube de Regatas do Flamengo	Rio de Janeiro
1984	Clube de Regatas do Flamengo	Rio de Janeiro
1985	Clube de Regatas do Flamengo	Campinas
1986	Clube de Regatas do Flamengo	Rio de Janeiro
1987	Clube de Regatas do Flamengo	Belo Horizonte
1988	Minas Tênis Clube	Curitiba
1989	Clube de Regatas do Flamengo	Rio de Janeiro
1990	Minas Tênis Clube	São Paulo
1991	Clube de Regatas do Flamengo	Rio de Janeiro
1992	Minas Tênis Clube	Belo Horizonte
1993	Esporte Clube Pinheiros	São Paulo
1994	Minas Tênis Clube	Rio de Janeiro
1994	Minas Tênis Clube	Belo Horizonte
1995	Esporte Clube Pinheiros	São Paulo
1996	Minas Tênis Clube	Rio de Janeiro
1997	Minas Tênis Clube	Belo Horizonte
1998	Esporte Clube Pinheiros	São Paulo
1999	Club de Regatas Vasco da Gama	Rio de Janeiro
2000	Club de Regatas Vasco da Gama	São Paulo
2001	Club de Regatas Vasco da Gama	Rio de Janeiro
2002	Clube de Regatas do Flamengo	Brasília
2003	Esporte Clube Pinheiros	Rio de Janeiro
2004	Esporte Clube Pinheiros	Rio de Janeiro
2005	Esporte Clube Pinheiros	Belo Horizonte
2006	Esporte Clube Pinheiros	Rio de Janeiro
2007	Esporte Clube Pinheiros	Rio de Janeiro
2008	Esporte Clube Pinheiros	Rio de Janeiro
2009	Esporte Clube Pinheiros	Rio de Janeiro
2010	Esporte Clube Pinheiros	Santos
2011	Minas Tênis Clube	Rio de Janeiro
2012	Clube de Regatas do Flamengo	Rio de Janeiro
2013	Minas Tênis Clube	Rio de Janeiro
2014	Sport Club Corinthians Paulista	São Paulo
2015	Esporte Clube Pinheiros	Rio de Janeiro
2016	Esporte Clube Pinheiros	Rio de Janeiro
2017	Esporte Clube Pinheiros	Rio de Janeiro
2018	Esporte Clube Pinheiros	Rio de Janeiro
2019	Esporte Clube Pinheiros	Rio de Janeiro
2020	Minas Tênis Clube	Rio de Janeiro

== Meet records ==
=== Long course (50 m) ===
==== Men ====
Event	Time		Name	Club	Date	Location	Ref
50 m freestyle	21.33		César Cielo	EC Pinheiros	5 May 2009	Rio de Janeiro, Brazil	
100 m freestyle	47.10		Guilherme Caribé	Unisanta|Unisanta	23 April 2025	Rio de Janeiro, Brazil	
200 m freestyle	1:46.08		Fernando Scheffer	Minas TC	20 April 2018	Rio de Janeiro, Brazil	
400 m freestyle	3:44.16		Samuel Short	(Australia) / Unisanta	21 April 2025	Rio de Janeiro, Brazil	
800 m freestyle	7:52.54		Guilherme Costa	EC Pinheiros	18 April 2018	Rio de Janeiro, Brazil	
1500 m freestyle	15:05.91		Guilherme Costa	EC Pinheiros	19 April 2019	Rio de Janeiro, Brazil	
50 m backstroke	24.44		Daniel Orzechowski	EC Pinheiros	24 April 2012	Rio de Janeiro, Brazil	
100 m backstroke	53.10	h	Guilherme Guido	EC Pinheiros	16 April 2016	Rio de Janeiro, Brazil	
200 m backstroke	1:57.38		Leonardo de Deus	CR Flamengo	26 April 2012	Rio de Janeiro, Brazil	
50 m breaststroke	26.42	h	João Gomes Júnior	EC Pinheiros	21 April 2019	Rio de Janeiro, Brazil	
100 m breaststroke	59.03		Henrique Barbosa	EC Pinheiros	10 May 2009	Rio de Janeiro, Brazil	
200 m breaststroke	2:08.44		Henrique Barbosa	EC Pinheiros	5 May 2009	Rio de Janeiro, Brazil	
50 m butterfly	22.61		Nicholas Santos	Unisanta	5 May 2017	Rio de Janeiro, Brazil	
100 m butterfly	51.21		Gabriel Mangabeira	EC Pinheiros	6 May 2009	Rio de Janeiro, Brazil	
200 m butterfly	1:53.92		Kaio de Almeida	–	8 May 2009	Rio de Janeiro, Brazil	
200 m individual medley	1:57.11		Thiago Pereira	Corinthians	25 April 2012	Rio de Janeiro, Brazil	
400 m individual medley	4:11.91		Thiago Pereira	Minas TC	3 May 2007	Rio de Janeiro, Brazil	
4×50 m freestyle relay	1:26.42			EC Pinheiros	6 May 2009	Rio de Janeiro, Brazil	
4×100 m freestyle relay	3:12.09		Gabriel Santos (48.45); Breno Correia (48.17); Marcelo Chierighini (47.43); Pedro Spajari (48.04)	EC Pinheiros	19 April 2019	Rio de Janeiro, Brazil	
4×200 m freestyle relay	7:09.81		Luiz Altamir Melo (1:46.73); Felipe Ribeiro (1:48.07); Leonardo Coelho Santos (1:48.40); Breno Correia (1:46.61)	EC Pinheiros	18 April 2019	Rio de Janeiro, Brazil	
4×100 m medley relay	3:32.98		Guilherme Guido (54.04); Felipe Lima (59.06); Pedro Vieira (52.28); Marcelo Chierighini (47.60)	EC Pinheiros	21 April 2019	Rio de Janeiro, Brazil	

Legend: # – Record awaiting ratification by CBDA; WR – World record; AM – Americas record; AS – Asian record; ER – European record; OC – Oceanian record;
Records not set in finals: h – heat; sf – semifinal; r – relay 1st leg; rh – relay heat 1st leg; b – B final; † – en route to final mark; tt – time trial

==== Women ====
Event	Time		Name	Club	Date	Location	Ref
50 m freestyle	24.53		Etiene Medeiros	SESI-SP	21 April 2019	Rio de Janeiro, Brazil	
100 m freestyle	53.33		Mallory Comerford	(United States) / Minas TC	18 April 2019	Rio de Janeiro, Brazil	
200 m freestyle	1:56.37		Maria Fernanda Costa	Unisanta	7 May 2024	Rio de Janeiro, Brazil	
400 m freestyle	4:05.70		Mireia Belmonte	(Spain) / CR Flamengo	28 April 2012	Rio de Janeiro, Brazil	
800 m freestyle	8:26.98		Lotte Friis	(Denmark) / Corinthians	26 April 2012	Rio de Janeiro, Brazil	
1500 m freestyle	16:11.40		Kristel Köbrich	Chile	8 May 2009	Rio de Janeiro, Brazil	
50 m backstroke	27.36		Etiene Medeiros	SESI-SP	20 April 2019	Rio de Janeiro, Brazil	
100 m backstroke	1:00.00	h	Etiene Medeiros	SESI-SP	16 April 2016	Rio de Janeiro, Brazil	
200 m backstroke	2:08.41		Kirsty Coventry	(Zimbabwe) / Minas TC	3 May 2011	Rio de Janeiro, Brazil	
50 m breaststroke	30.17		Jessica Hardy	(United States) / CR Flamengo	7 May 2011	Rio de Janeiro, Brazil	
100 m breaststroke	1:05.79		Rebecca Soni	(United States) / Minas TC	5 May 2011	Rio de Janeiro, Brazil	
200 m breaststroke	2:24.83		Rebecca Soni	(United States) / Minas TC	3 May 2011	Rio de Janeiro, Brazil	
50 m butterfly	25.29		Jeanette Ottesen	(Denmark) / Corinthians	26 April 2012	Rio de Janeiro, Brazil	
100 m butterfly	57.22		Jeanette Ottesen	(Denmark) / Corinthians	22 April 2014	São Paulo, Brazil	
200 m butterfly	2:08.22		Katinka Hosszú	(Hungary) / Corinthians	24 April 2014	São Paulo, Brazil	
200 m individual medley	2:10.60		Katinka Hosszú	(Hungary) / Corinthians	25 April 2014	São Paulo, Brazil	
400 m individual medley	4:34.91		Katinka Hosszú	(Hungary) / Corinthians	23 April 2014	São Paulo, Brazil	
4×50 m freestyle relay	1:40.03		(Hungary) Katinka Hosszú (24.89); (Brazil) Natalia de Luccas (25.31); (Brazil) Bruna Rocha (25.79); (Denmark) Jeanette Ottesen (24.04)	Corinthians	21 April 2014	São Paulo, Brazil	
4×100 m freestyle relay	3:41.62		(Brazil) Etiene Medeiros (54.99); (Brazil) Priscila de Souza (56.45); (Brazil) Jéssica Cavalheiro (55.31); (Brazil) Daynara de Paula (54.87)	SESI-SP	9 April 2015	Rio de Janeiro, Brazil	
4×200 m freestyle relay	8:03.22		(Brazil) Joanna Maranhão (2:00.60); (Brazil) Manuella Lyrio (1:59.75); (Brazil) Gabrielle Roncatto (2:03.37); (Brazil) Larissa Oliveira (1:59.50)	EC Pinheiros	8 April 2015	Rio de Janeiro, Brazil	
4×100 m medley relay	4:04.49		(Brazil) Maria Pessanha (1:02.38); (Brazil) Jhennifer Conceição (1:08.44); (Brazil) Giovanna Diamante (58.74); (Brazil) Larissa Oliveira (54.93)	EC Pinheiros	21 April 2019	Rio de Janeiro, Brazil	

Legend: # – Record awaiting ratification by CBDA; WR – World record; AM – Americas record; AS – Asian record; ER – European record; OC – Oceanian record;
Records not set in finals: h – heat; sf – semifinal; r – relay 1st leg; rh – relay heat 1st leg; b – B final; † – en route to final mark; tt – time trial

=== Short course (25 m) ===
==== Men ====
Event	Time	Name	Club	Date	Location	Ref
50 m freestyle						
100 m freestyle						
200 m freestyle						
400 m freestyle						
800 m freestyle						
1500m freestyle						
50 m backstroke						
100 m backstroke						
200 m backstroke						
50m breaststroke						
100m breaststroke						
200m breaststroke						
50 m butterfly						
100 m butterfly						
200 m butterfly						
200m individual medley						
400 m individual medley						
4×50m freestyle relay						
4×100 m freestyle relay						
4×200 m freestyle relay						
4×100 m medley relay						

Legend: # – Record awaiting ratification by CBDA; WR – World record; AM – Americas record;
Records not set in finals: h – heat; sf – semifinal; r – relay 1st leg; rh – relay heat 1st leg; b – B final; † – en route to final mark; tt – time trial

==== Women ====
Event	Time	Name	Club	Date	Location	Ref
50m freestyle						
100 m freestyle						
200 m freestyle						
400 m freestyle						
800m freestyle	8:27.77	Poliana Okimoto	Corinthians	20 September 2010	Rio de Janeiro, Brazil	
1500m freestyle						
50 m backstroke						
100 m backstroke						
200m backstroke						
50 m breaststroke						
100 m breaststroke						
200 m breaststroke						
50 m butterfly						
100 m butterfly						
200 m butterfly						
200 m individual medley						
400 m individual medley						
4×50m freestyle relay						
4×100 m freestyle relay						
4×200m freestyle relay						
4×100 m medley relay						

Legend: # – Record awaiting ratification by CBDA; WR – World record; AM – Americas record;
Records not set in finals: h – heat; sf – semifinal; r – relay 1st leg; rh – relay heat 1st leg; b – B final; † – en route to final mark; tt – time trial
