= Brazilian Confederation of Aquatic Sports =

Sports governing body in Brazil

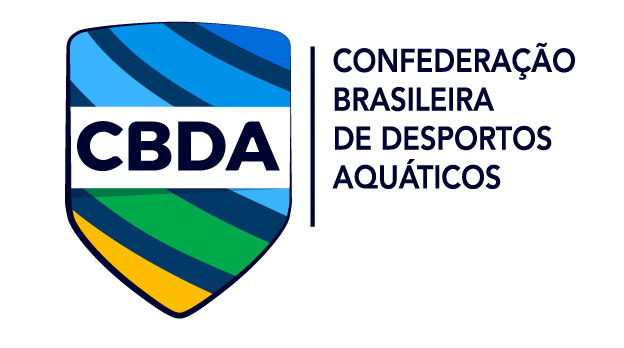
- Jurisdiction: Brazil
- Abbreviation: CBDA
- Founded: 21 October 1977
- Affiliation: FINA
- Headquarters: Rio de Janeiro, Brazil
- President: Diego Albuquerque.
- Vice president: Marcelo Falcão

Official website
- novo.cbda.org.br
- (Brazil)

The Brazilian Confederation of Aquatic Sports (Portuguese: Confederação Brasileira de Desportos Aquáticos; CBDA) is the governing body of aquatic sports in Brazil.

It was founded as the Brazilian Swimming Confederation (Portuguese: Confederação Brasileira de Natação; CBN) on 21 October 1977 after dismembering from the Brazilian Sports Confederation. The confederation was renamed in 1988 to reflect all modalities it manages: swimming, open water, water polo, diving and artistic swimming.

Currently, it has all 26 Brazilian states, in addition to the Federal District, as affiliated federations.

== Affiliations ==
- International Swimming Federation (FINA)
- Brazilian Olympic Committee (COB)

== Notable Championships ==
=== Brazil Swimming Trophy (Maria Lenk) ===
Access Event Article

The Brazil Swimming Trophy (Formerly: Maria Lenk Trophy) is a Brazilian competition played by teams in individual and relay events. It is also known as the Brazilian Summer Championship and / or Brazilian Long Course Championship (LCM). It is one of the most notable events nationwide.

=== José Finkel Trophy ===
Access Event Article

The José Finkel Trophy is a Brazilian competition played by teams in individual and relay events. It is also known as the Brazilian Winter Championship and / or the Brazilian Short Course Championship (SCM), despite being sporadically played in Long Course Pools (LCM). It is one of the most notable events nationwide.

== Affiliated Federations ==
State federations directly affiliated to the Brazilian Confederation of Aquatic Sports. Click here to access the complete and updated list. (In Brazilian Portuguese Only)
