= Carolina Mussi =

Brazilian swimmer (born 1988)

Personal information
- Full name: Carolina Hurga Mussi
- Nationality: Brazil
- Born: August 7, 1988 (age 38) São Paulo, São Paulo, Brazil
- Height: 1.70 m (5 ft 7 in)
- Weight: 57 kg (126 lb)

Sport
- Sport: Swimming
- Strokes: Breaststroke
Medal record
Women's swimming
Representing Brazil
South American Games
Gold medal – first place	2010 Medellín	200 m breaststroke
Bronze medal – third place	2010 Medellín	100 m breaststroke

Carolina Hurga Mussi (born August 7, 1988, in São Paulo, São Paulo, Brazil), is a Brazilian competitive swimmer.

She joined the national delegation that participated in the 2009 World Aquatics Championships in Rome, where she competed in the 4×100-metre medley, along with Fabíola Molina, Gabriella Silva and Tatiana Lemos team that finished eighth in the final. In the playoffs they beat the South American record, doing 3:58.49. Before World Championship, Carolina broke the South American record of the 200-metre breaststroke at Maria Lenk Trophy. In this World Championship, was also in 25th in the 100-metre breaststroke and was disqualified from the 200-metre breaststroke

She was at the 2010 Pan Pacific Swimming Championships in Irvine, where she finished 22nd in the 50-metre breaststroke, 20th in the 100-metre breaststroke and 23rd the 200-metre breaststroke.

Attending the 2010 South American Games, won the gold medal in the 200-metre breaststroke, and bronze in the 100-metre breaststroke.

At the 2011 World Aquatics Championships in Shanghai, she earned the 36th position in the 100-metre breaststroke and 17th in the 4×100-metre medley.

In the 2011 Pan American Games in Guadalajara, Carolina was in 14th place in the 100-metre breaststroke.
