= José Finkel Trophy =

Brazilian swimming competition held from 1972 onwards

Tournament information
- Sport: Swimming
- Location: Brazil
- Established: 1972
- Number of tournaments: 47
- Administrator: CBDA
- Format: Team Competition by Points

Current champion
- Minas Tênis Clube

The José Finkel Trophy is a Brazilian competition played by teams in individual and relay swimming events. It is also known as the Brazilian Open Winter Championship and / or the Brazilian Open Short Course Pool Championship, despite being sporadically played in the Long Course Pool. It is one of the most notable events nationwide.

Its first edition took place in 1972 in Curitiba and had Botafogo de Futebol e Regatas as champion. The most recent edition took place in the city of Curitiba in September 2019. The trophy is marked by the hegemony of the clubs in the states of Rio de Janeiro, São Paulo and Minas Gerais. Its name is a tribute to the promising swimmer from Paraná, José Finkel, who died in 1971 as a result of cancer.

== Trophy history ==
After José Finkel's death, Berek Krieger, then president of the Paraná Aquatics Sports Federation (FDAP) decided to create a competition in the winter, thus filling a hole in the national swimming calendar. The creation of the event would also be a way to improve the mood of swimming in Paraná, which had been greatly reduced by the death of the young swimmer. Finkel started treatment and disappeared, probably saved by the family, of the taboos related to this disease, then in effect. A few weeks later, Finkel died. The team he was part of, Centro Israelita, could not bear the loss, and after Finkel's death no one trained anymore.

== About José Finkel ==
José Finkel was an athlete born in 1954. In 1968, he helped the Curitiba team to be the winner of men's swimming in the 12th Paraná Open Games. In October 1970, the small swimming team, Centro Israelita, traveled to a competition at Grêmio Náutico União, in Porto Alegre. The state of Paraná was, then, weak in this sport. He had never produced a swimmer of national prominence. José Finkel, still 17 years old, was already considered the best "Breastroker" of the team. In one of the training sessions for the competition, Finkel started to feel bad. When the team returned to Curitiba, he faced the medical exams and his clinical picture pointed to cancer in the lymphatic vessels.

== Champion by Year ==
Year	Champion	Local	Course meter
1972	Botafogo de Futebol e Regatas	Curitiba	SCM (25M)
1973	Botafogo de Futebol e Regatas	Curitiba	SCM (25M)
1974	Botafogo de Futebol e Regatas	Londrina	SCM (25M)
1975	Botafogo de Futebol e Regatas	Curitiba	SCM (25M)
1976	A Hebraica	Curitiba	SCM (25M)
1977	Clube de Regatas do Flamengo	São Paulo	Unavailable
1978	Fluminense Football Club	Rio de Janeiro	Unavailable
1979	Esporte Clube Pinheiros	Paraná	SCM (25M)
1980	Clube de Regatas do Flamengo	Paraná	SCM (25M)
1981	Clube de Regatas do Flamengo	Paraná	SCM (25M)
1982	Clube de Regatas do Flamengo	Paraná	SCM (25M)
1983	Clube de Regatas do Flamengo	Londrina	SCM (25M)
1984	Clube de Regatas do Flamengo	São Paulo	Unavailable
1985	Clube de Regatas do Flamengo	São Paulo	Unavailable
1986	Clube de Regatas do Flamengo	São Paulo	Unavailable
1987	Clube de Regatas do Flamengo	São Paulo	Unavailable
1988	Minas Tênis Clube	São Paulo	Unavailable
1989	Undeclared (Canceled due to risk of meningitis outbreak)	Santos	SCM (25M)
1990	Clube de Regatas do Flamengo	Santos	Unavailable
1991	Minas Tênis Clube	Rio de Janeiro	LCM (50M)
1992	Esporte Clube Pinheiros	Londrina	SCM (25M)
1993	Minas Tênis Clube	Santos	Unavailable
1994	Minas Tênis Clube	Santos	Unavailable
1995	Esporte Clube Pinheiros	Santos	Unavailable
1996	Minas Tênis Clube	Santos	Unavailable
1997	Esporte Clube Pinheiros	Santos	Unavailable
1998	Minas Tênis Clube	Rio de Janeiro	SCM (25M)
1999	Club de Regatas Vasco da Gama	Rio de Janeiro	LCM (50M)
2000	Club de Regatas Vasco da Gama	Rio de Janeiro	LCM (50M)
2001	Clube de Regatas do Flamengo	Santos	SCM (25M)
2002	Clube de Regatas do Flamengo	Santos	SCM (25M)
2003	Esporte Clube Pinheiros	Santos	LCM (50M)
2004	Esporte Clube Pinheiros	Santos	SCM (25M)
2005	Esporte Clube Pinheiros	Santos	SCM (25M)
2006	Esporte Clube Pinheiros	São Paulo	LCM (50M)
2007	Esporte Clube Pinheiros	Palhoça	LCM (50M)
2008	Esporte Clube Pinheiros	São Paulo	LCM (50M)
2009	Esporte Clube Pinheiros	Palhoça	LCM (50M)
2010	Esporte Clube Pinheiros	Rio de Janeiro	SCM (25M)
2011	Minas Tênis Clube	Belo Horizonte	LCM (50M)
2012	Minas Tênis Clube	São Paulo	SCM (25M)
2013	Minas Tênis Clube	São Paulo	LCM (50M)
2014	Minas Tênis Clube	Guaratinguetá	SCM (25M)
2015	Minas Tênis Clube	São Paulo	LCM (50M)
2016	Esporte Clube Pinheiros	Santos	SCM (25M)
2017	Esporte Clube Pinheiros	Santos	LCM (50M)
2018	Esporte Clube Pinheiros	São Paulo	SCM (25M)
2019	Minas Tênis Clube	Curitiba	LCM (50M)
2020	Not disputed because of the COVID-19 pandemic	Guaratinguetá	SCM (25M)
2021	Minas Tênis Clube	Bauru	SCM (25M)
2022	Esporte Clube Pinheiros	Recife	SCM (25M)
2023	Esporte Clube Pinheiros	São Paulo	LCM (50M)
2024	Esporte Clube Pinheiros	Florianópolis	SCM (25M)
2025	TBA	São Paulo	LCM (50M)

== Meet records ==
=== Long course (50 m) ===
==== Men ====
Event	Time	Name	Club	Date	Location	Ref
50 m freestyle	21.55	Nicholas Santos	EC Pinheiros	2 September 2009	Palhoça, Brazil	
100 m freestyle	48.43	Marcelo Chierighini	EC Pinheiros	22 August 2015	São Paulo, Brazil	
200 m freestyle	1:47.41	Nicolas Oliveira	Minas TC	17 August 2015	São Paulo, Brazil	
400 m freestyle	3:50.81	Leonardo de Deus	Corinthians	21 August 2015	São Paulo, Brazil	
800 m freestyle	8:00.09	Luiz Arapiraca	Unisanta	5 September 2009	Palhoça, Brazil	
1500 m freestyle	15:13.13	Luiz Arapiraca	Unisanta	2 September 2009	Palhoça, Brazil	
50 m backstroke	24.69	Guilherme Guido	EC Pinheiros	3 September 2009	Palhoça, Brazil	
100 m backstroke	53.24	Guilherme Guido	EC Pinheiros	6 September 2009	Palhoça, Brazil	
200 m backstroke	1:58.36	Thiago Pereira	Minas TC	4 September 2009	Palhoça, Brazil	
50 m breaststroke	27.03	João Gomes Júnior	EC Pinheiros	22 August 2015	São Paulo, Brazil	
100 m breaststroke	1:00.15	Felipe França Silva	Corinthians	20 August 2015	São Paulo, Brazil	
200 m breaststroke	2:10.91	Thiago Pereira	Minas TC	2 September 2009	Palhoça, Brazil	
50 m butterfly	22.87	Nicholas Santos	EC Pinheiros	4 September 2009	Palhoça, Brazil	
100 m butterfly	51.06	Gabriel Mangabeira	EC Pinheiros	3 September 2009	Palhoça, Brazil	
200 m butterfly	1:55.05	Kaio de Almeida	Tijuca TC	5 September 2009	Palhoça, Brazil	
200 m individual medley	1:57.40	Thiago Pereira	Minas TC	6 September 2009	Palhoça, Brazil	
400 m individual medley	4:13.76	Brandonn Almeida	Corinthians	11 August 2017	Santos, Brazil	
4×50 m freestyle relay	1:27.22	Nicholas Santos; César Cielo; Bruno Fratus; Fernando Silva	EC Pinheiros	4 September 2008	São Paulo, Brazil	
4×100 m freestyle relay	3:15.57	Marcelo Chierighini; Gabriel Santos; Henrique Rodrigues; Bruno Fratus	EC Pinheiros	20 August 2015	São Paulo, Brazil	
4×200 m freestyle relay	7:17.05	Gabriel Ogawa; André Pereira; Breno Correia; Luiz Altamir Melo	EC Pinheiros	9 August 2017	Santos, Brazil	
4×100 m medley relay	3:33.01	Guilherme Guido; Henrique Barbosa; Gabriel Mangabeira; Fernando Silva	EC Pinheiros	5 September 2009	Palhoça, Brazil	

Legend: # – Record awaiting ratification by CBDA; WR – World record; AM – Americas record;
Records not set in finals: h – heat; sf – semifinal; r – relay 1st leg; rh – relay heat 1st leg; b – B final; † – en route to final mark; so – swim-off; tt – time trial

==== Women ====
Event	Time		Name	Club	Date	Location	Ref
50 m freestyle	24.39		Inge de Bruijn	(Netherlands) / CR Vasco da Gama	10 June 2000	Rio de Janeiro, Brazil	
100 m freestyle	54.74		Femke Heemskerk	(Netherlands) / Minas TC	17 August 2013	São Paulo, Brazil	
200 m freestyle	1:58.65		Manuella Lyrio	EC Pinheiros	17 August 2015	São Paulo, Brazil	
400 m freestyle	4:11.14		Leah Neale	(Australia) / Minas TC	21 August 2015	São Paulo, Brazil	
800 m freestyle	8:37.05		Joanna Maranhão	Unisanta	12 August 2017	Santos, Brazil	
1500 m freestyle	16:26.90		Poliana Okimoto	Minas TC	12 August 2013	São Paulo, Brazil	
50 m backstroke	27.99		Fabíola Molina	AE São José	3 September 2009	Palhoça, Brazil	
100 m backstroke	1:00.22		Fabíola Molina	AE São José	6 September 2009	Palhoça, Brazil	
200 m backstroke	2:12.49		Duane Da Rocha	(Spain) / EC Pinheiros	22 August 2015	São Paulo, Brazil	
50 m breaststroke	31.08	h	Jhennifer Conceição	EC Pinheiros	10 August 2017	Santos, Brazil	
100 m breaststroke	1:08.23		Taylor McKeown	(Australia) / Minas TC	20 August 2015	São Paulo, Brazil	
200 m breaststroke	2:24.09		Taylor McKeown	(Australia) / Minas TC	18 August 2015	São Paulo, Brazil	
50 m butterfly	25.71		Inge de Bruijn	(Netherlands) / CR Vasco da Gama	11 June 2000	Rio de Janeiro, Brazil	
100 m butterfly	57.65		Inge de Bruijn	(Netherlands) / CR Vasco da Gama	6 June 2000	Rio de Janeiro, Brazil	
200 m butterfly	2:09.41		Joanna Maranhão	Minas TC	5 September 2009	Palhoça, Brazil	
200 m individual medley	2:11.79		Joanna Maranhão	Unisanta	9 August 2017	Santos, Brazil	
400 m individual medley	4:40.65		Joanna Maranhão	Minas TC	3 September 2009	Palhoça, Brazil	
4×50 m freestyle relay	1:40.63		Flávia Delaroli; Julyana Kury; Michelle Lenhardt; Tatiana Lemos	EC Pinheiros	3 September 2009	Palhoça, Brazil	
4×100 m freestyle relay	3:41.49		Tatiana Lemos (55.16); Michelle Lenhardt (54.89); Monique Ferreira (55.62); Julyana Kury (55.82)	EC Pinheiros	6 September 2009	Palhoça, Brazil	
4×200 m freestyle relay	8:05.60		Manuella Lyrio (2:00.03); Joanna Maranhão; Aline Rodrigues; Larissa Oliveira	EC Pinheiros	19 August 2015	São Paulo, Brazil	
4×100 m medley relay	4:06.78		(Brazil) Tatiana Adorno (1:05.18); (Australia) Taylor McKeown; (Brazil) Daiene Dias; (Brazil) Daiane Becker	Minas TC	22 August 2015	São Paulo, Brazil	

Legend: # – Record awaiting ratification by CBDA; WR – World record; AM – Americas record;
Records not set in finals: h – heat; sf – semifinal; r – relay 1st leg; rh – relay heat 1st leg; b – B final; † – en route to final mark; so – swim-off; tt – time trial

=== Short course (25 m) ===
==== Men ====
Event	Time		Name	Club	Date	Location	Ref
50 m freestyle	20.54		Guilherme Caribé	Recreio da Juventude	4 September 2026	São Paulo, Brazil	
100 m freestyle	45.61		Guilherme Caribé	Recreio da Juventude	2 September 2026	São Paulo, Brazil	
200 m freestyle	1:41.32		Fernando Scheffer	Minas TC	16 September 2022	Recife, Brazil	
400 m freestyle	3:37.46		Leonardo Alcantara	Minas TC	31 August 2026	São Paulo, Brazil	
800 m freestyle	7:37.47		Leonardo Alcantara	Minas TC	4 September 2026	São Paulo, Brazil	
1500 m freestyle	14:39.42		Guilherme Costa	Unisanta	14 September 2022	Recife, Brazil	
50m backstroke	22.68		Guilherme Guido	EC Pinheiros	26 August 2018	São Paulo, Brazil	
100m backstroke	49.62		Guilherme Guido	EC Pinheiros	27 August 2018	São Paulo, Brazil	
200m backstroke	1:49.84		Hugo González	(Spain) / Minas TC	1 September 2026	São Paulo, Brazil	
50m breaststroke	25.71		Felipe França Silva	Corinthians	6 September 2014	Guaratinguetá, Brazil	
100m breaststroke	56.25		Felipe França Silva	Corinthians	4 September 2014	Guaratinguetá, Brazil	
200m breaststroke	2:02.58		Thiago Simon	Corinthians	13 September 2016	Santos, Brazil	
50m butterfly	21.86		Guilherme Caribé	Recreio da Juventude	3 September 2026	São Paulo, Brazil	
100m butterfly	49.69		Pedro Souza	Minas TC	31 August 2026	São Paulo, Brazil	
200m butterfly	1:51.00		Vinicius Lanza	Minas TC	26 August 2018	São Paulo, Brazil	
100m individual medley	51.46		Hugo González	(Spain) / Minas TC	4 September 2026	São Paulo, Brazil	
200m individual medley	1:52.16		Vinicius Lanza	Minas TC	25 August 2018	São Paulo, Brazil	
400m individual medley	4:01.91		Thiago Pereira	Corinthians	21 August 2012	São Paulo, Brazil	
4×50m freestyle relay	1:25.28	AM	César Cielo (20.81); Nicholas Santos (21.01); Bernardo Novaes (21.65); Thiago Sickert (21.81)	CR Flamengo	20 August 2012	São Paulo, Brazil	
4×100m freestyle relay	3:06.46		Gabriel Santos (47.13); Marcelo Chierighini (46.90); Breno Correia (46.38); Pedro Spajari (46.05)	EC Pinheiros	13 September 2022	Recife, Brazil	
4×200m freestyle relay	6:54.15		Breno Correia (1:43.15); Kaique Alves (1:41.74); Leonardo Coelho Santos (1:45.59); Murilo Sartori (1:43.67)	EC Pinheiros	1 September 2026	São Paulo, Brazil	
4×100m medley relay	3:23.89		Gabriel Fantoni; Felipe Lima; Vinicius Lanza; Marco Ferreira Júnior	Minas TC	28 August 2018	São Paulo, Brazil	

Legend: # – Record awaiting ratification by CBDA; WR – World record; AM – Americas record;
Records not set in finals: h – heat; sf – semifinal; r – relay 1st leg; rh – relay heat 1st leg; b – B final; † – en route to final mark; so – swim-off; tt – time trial

==== Women ====
Event	Time	Name	Club	Date	Location	Ref
50m freestyle	23.83	Etiene Medeiros	SESI-SP	17 September 2022	Recife, Brazil	
100m freestyle	52.34	Femke Heemskerk	(Netherlands) / Minas TC	6 September 2014	Guaratinguetá, Brazil	
200m freestyle	1:52.46	Femke Heemskerk	(Netherlands) / Minas TC	1 September 2014	Guaratinguetá, Brazil	
400m freestyle	3:59.33	Maria Fernanda Costa	Unisanta	13 August 2024	Florianópolis, Brazil	
800m freestyle	8:19.57	Viviane Jungblut	GNU	14 September 2016	Santos, Brazil	
1500m freestyle	15:57.09	Leticia Fassina Romão	Minas TC	4 September 2026	São Paulo, Brazil	
50m backstroke	25.95	Etiene Medeiros	SESI-SP	26 August 2018	São Paulo, Brazil	
100m backstroke	57.53	Etiene Medeiros	SESI-SP	1 September 2014	Guaratinguetá, Brazil	
200m backstroke	2:06.91	Andrea Berrino	(Argentina) / Unisanta	15 September 2016	Santos, Brazil	
50m breaststroke	29.87	Jhennifer Conceição	EC Pinheiros	15 September 2022	Recife, Brazil	
100m breaststroke	1:04.91	Moniek Nijhuis	(Netherlands) / Minas TC	4 September 2014	Guaratinguetá, Brazil	
200m breaststroke	2:21.31	Julia Sebastián	(Argentina) / Unisanta	28 August 2018	São Paulo, Brazil	
50m butterfly	25.15	Giulia Carvalho	Minas TC	3 September 2026	São Paulo, Brazil	
100m butterfly	56.06	Giulia Carvalho	Minas TC	31 August 2026	São Paulo, Brazil	
200m butterfly	2:07.15	Giovanna Diamante	EC Pinheiros	15 September 2022	Recife, Brazil	
100m individual medley	59.42	Giulia Carvalho	Minas TC	4 September 2026	São Paulo, Brazil	
200m individual medley	2:07.91	Femke Heemskerk	(Netherlands) / Minas TC	5 September 2014	Guaratinguetá, Brazil	
400m individual medley	4:33.92	Joanna Maranhão	EC Pinheiros	14 September 2016	Santos, Brazil	
4×50m freestyle relay	1:38.04	(Brazil) Carolina Bergamaschi; (Netherlands) Femke Heemskerk; (Brazil) Roberta Albino; (Brazil) Lorrane Ferreira	Minas TC	1 September 2014	Guaratinguetá, Brazil	
4×100m freestyle relay	3:36.04	(Brazil) Giulia Carvalho; (Brazil) Luanna de Oliveira; (Brazil) Aline Rodrigues; (Colombia) Sirena Rowe	Minas TC	31 August 2026	São Paulo, Brazil	
4×200m freestyle relay	7:50.57	Ana Carolina Vieira; Camila Mello; Andressa Cholodovskis Lima; Maria Paula Heitmann	Minas TC	25 August 2018	São Paulo, Brazil	
4×100m medley relay	3:58.07	Maria Pessanha; Jhennifer Conceição; Giovanna Diamante; Larissa Oliveira	EC Pinheiros	28 August 2018	São Paulo, Brazil	

Legend: # – Record awaiting ratification by CBDA; WR – World record; AM – Americas record;
Records not set in finals: h – heat; sf – semifinal; r – relay 1st leg; rh – relay heat 1st leg; b – B final; † – en route to final mark; so – swim-off; tt – time trial
