= Esporte Clube Pinheiros =

Multi-sport club in São Paulo, Brazil

Esporte Clube Pinheiros São Paulo
- Full name: Esporte Clube Pinheiros São Paulo (E.C.P.S.P.)
- Founded: 7 September 1899; 127 years ago
- Location: São Paulo, São Paulo, Brazil
- Chairman: André Perego Fiore
- Colors: Blue, black and white
- Website: www.ecp.org.br

Esporte Clube Pinheiros
Home colours	Away colours

Esporte Clube Pinheiros is a Brazilian multi-sports and social club based in the city of São Paulo. The full name of the club is Esporte Clube Pinheiros São Paulo (E.C.P.S.P.). The club's name is commonly abbreviated as E.C. Pinheiros, or E.C.P. It has around 35,000 members, and its terrain comprises 170,000 m^{2} in the well regarded quarter of Jardim Europa. The club's assets are valued to be in excess of R$ 350 million.

The club was founded on 7 September 1899, anniversary of Brazilian independence, by German immigrants, most notably Hans Nobiling, under the name Sport Club Germânia (Sport Club Germany).

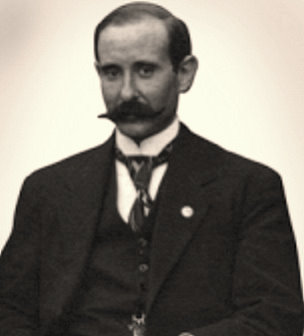
Hans Nobiling ca. 1930s

Historically, Germânia is the fourth oldest football club of Brazil and was part of the first inter club match of the country. Until 1915 the club had won twice the State Championship of São Paulo. Already early tennis grew popular among the club members and the club should become one of the co-founders of the Tennis association of São Paulo. The football department was basically abandoned by the club with the advent of the professionalization of the sport in the 1930s. During the course of World War II the club abandoned references to its German origin and in 1941 was renamed to Pinheiros because of requirements of the laws of that time.

In later years water polo was very popular. In the 1970s João Carlos de Oliveira from Pinheiros held the world record in the triple jump. In more recent times the club has joined the national elite in basketball and volleyball, in the former even winning international titles. César Cielo won Olympic gold in swimming and Beatriz Souza in Judo.

== History ==
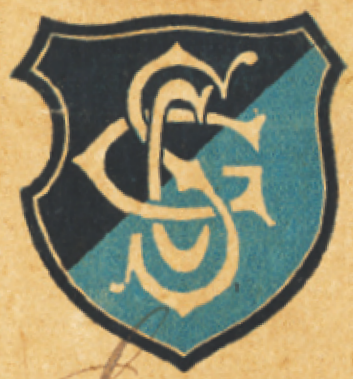
Logo of SC Germânia ca. 1909.

Sport Club Germânia (S.C. Germânia) was one of the clubs which established football in Brazil, and was one of the clubs which participated in 1899, in the first inter-club match, and in 1902, in the first championship match of the country. Germânia was twice the winner of the state championship of São Paulo, the Campeonato Paulista. The eminent player of the early days of the club was Hermann Friese, considered the first football player personality of Brazil. Arthur Friedenreich, the first great star of Brazilian football, and widely acknowledged as one of the all-time greats of the sport, commenced his career at Germânia in 1909.

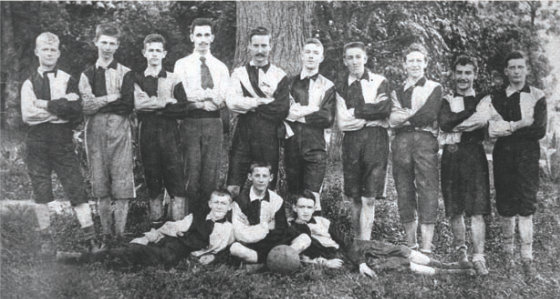
The football team in the early years. Club's founder, Hans Nobiling (with tie) poses with the players.

After abandoning football in the early 1930s, due to the professionalization of the game, the club successfully transformed itself to a universal sports club. Already in 1932, the water sports department sent its first representative to the Olympic Games. Many more athletes from the club since represented Brazil in major international sports events, and swimmers like Gustavo Borges and César Cielo are among the club's Olympic medal winners. The basketball and volleyball teams play in the national top divisions, and the swimmers continue their dominance in Brazil. Beyond this, Pinheiros has departments for many more modalities, such as judo, gymnastics, and tennis.

Since its merger with the Gesellschaft Germania, a social club of German immigrants, in the early 1940s, to form the Esporte Clube Pinheiros, named after the river Rio Pinheiros, flowing close by its seat, the club has also developed as a meeting place and venue for cultural events. These days, thousands of visitors pass daily through the club's restaurants, bars, and other facilities. Top stars of the Brazilian entertainment industry, like Daniela Mercury and Jorge Ben Jor have performed in the club's auditorium, which at its opening in 1957, was the largest of its kind in South America. Also classical music and theatrical plays are regularly on the schedule. Further facilities of the club include a kindergarten, library, and the Centro Pró-Memória Hans Nobiling, which comprises a museum displaying trophies and other memorabilia from the club's rich history, as well as the archives.

== Activities ==
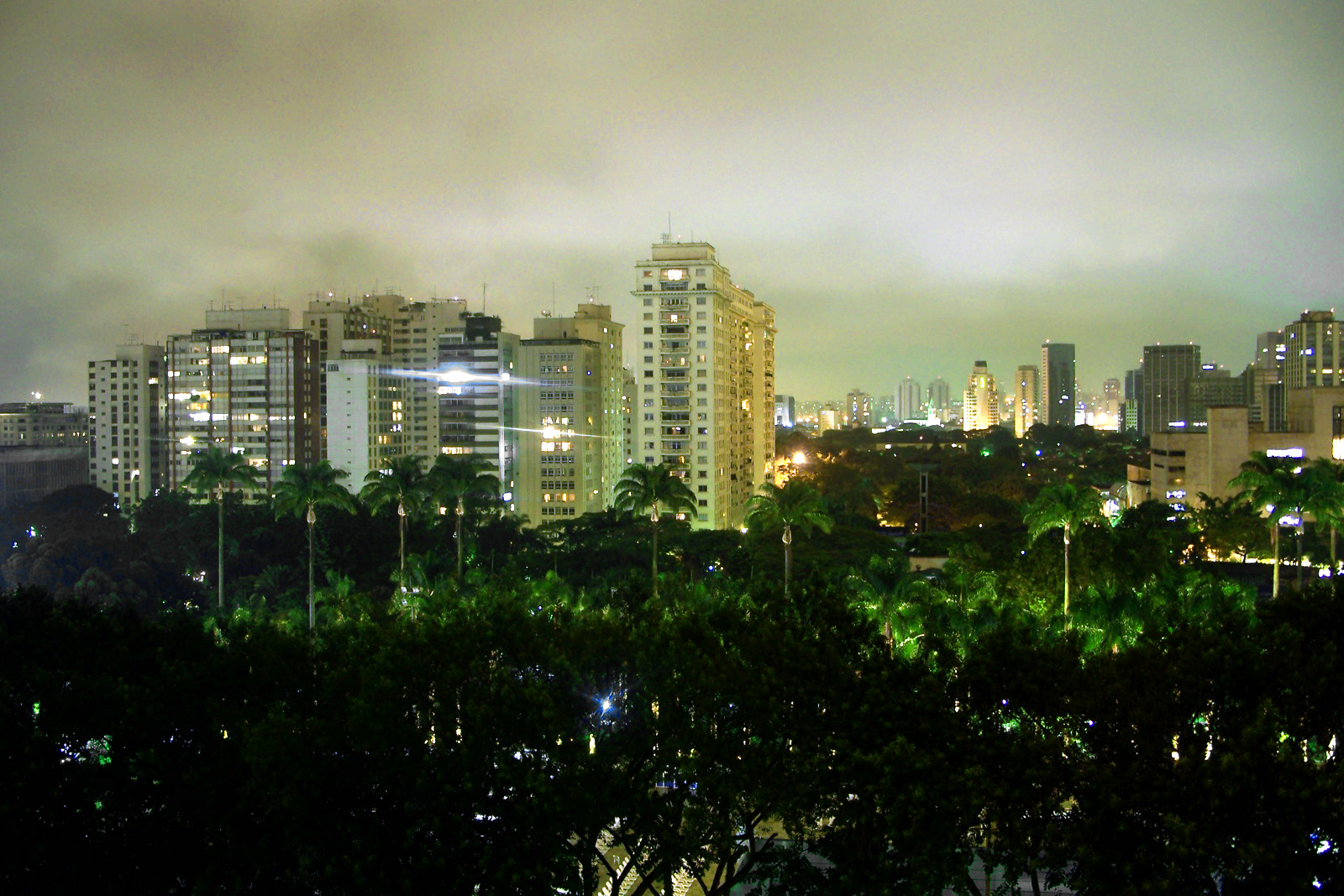
Nocturnal view across the greenery of the club, to apartment blocks along Rua Angelina Maffei Vita.

=== Basketball ===
In the 2005–06 season, EC Pinheiros participated for the first time in the professional first division of Brazilian basketball, but then failed to qualify for the single league that resulted from the merging of the conferences. In the 2008–09 season, Pinheiros joined the new top Brazilian league, called the Novo Basquete Brasil, under the sponsored name Pinheiros/Sky. The team plays at the Ginásio Poliesportivo Henrique Villaboim, on the club's grounds in Jardim Europa.

In 2013, the team won its first international title, the most important competition of the Americas, the FIBA Americas League, and thus qualified to play at the 2013 edition of the FIBA Intercontinental Cup, where it lost the series against the EuroLeague champions Olympiacos, of the Greek Basket League.

=== Handball ===
EC Pinheiros is a recognized powerhouse in Brazilian handball, winning the Paulista Championship 30 times including the 2016 edition, the National League 6 times the last time being the 2015 edition and the Pan American Championship twice including the 2017 edition.

The women's team is achieving success recently, winning their first national championship in 2016.

=== Judo ===
At the Olympic Games 1984 in Los Angeles Douglas Vieira won silver and thus the first Olympic medal for the judoka of Pinheiros. In 2008 Leandro Guilheiro won a bronze medal in judo in the −73 kg class. In London 2012 Rafael Silva won the first bronze medal of the +100 kg category in judo – the tenth Olympic medal in the club's history. After that, Silva would also win bronze in Rio 2016 and Paris 2024.

At the 2024 Summer Olympics in Paris, Willian Lima won the silver medal, becoming the first Brazilian, men or women, to win a medal at that edition of the Olympic Games.

Also in Paris, Larissa Pimenta won the silver medal, the first ever Olympic medal won by a woman athlete from Pinheiros and Beatriz Souza won the gold medal, becoming the first ever woman athlete from Pinheiros to be crowned champion in all Olympic Games history.

Later, Silva, Lima, Pimenta, Souza and other Brazilian judoka's would also win bronze in the mixed team competition at Paris, the first ever medal won by Brazilians in that category, making this the best performance by Brazilian judokas in a single edition of the Olympic Games until that point.

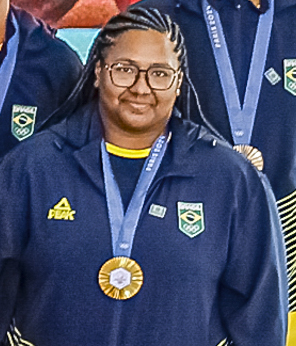
Beatriz Souza, the first ever woman athlete from Pinheiros to be crowned Olympic champion

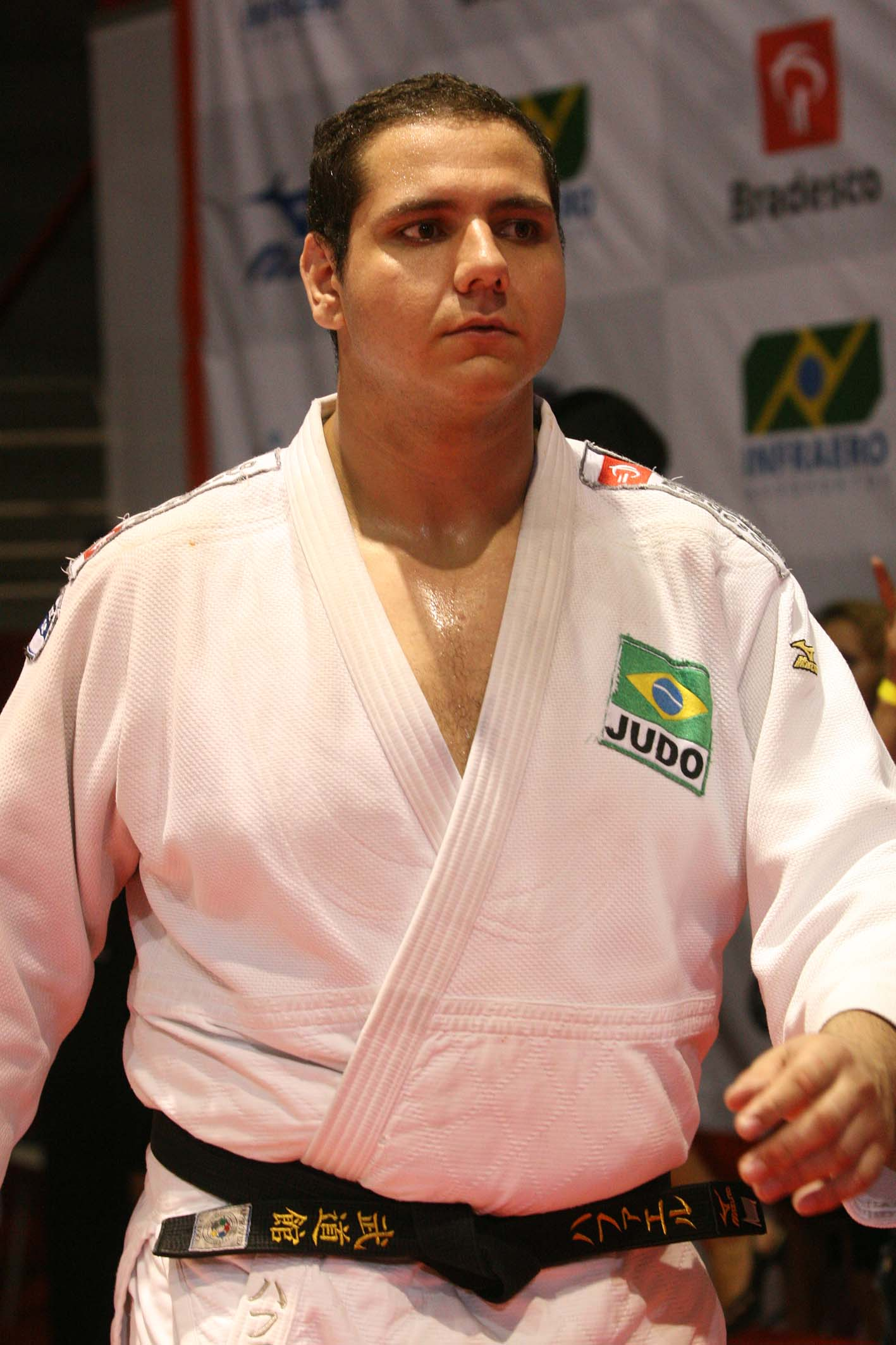
Rafael Silva, Baby, a three time bronze medalist at the Olympic Games

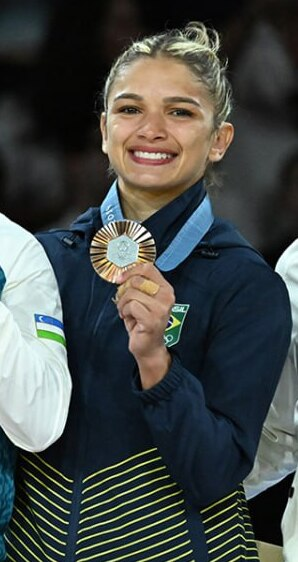
Larissa Pimenta, the first woman athlete from Pinheiros to win an Olympic medal

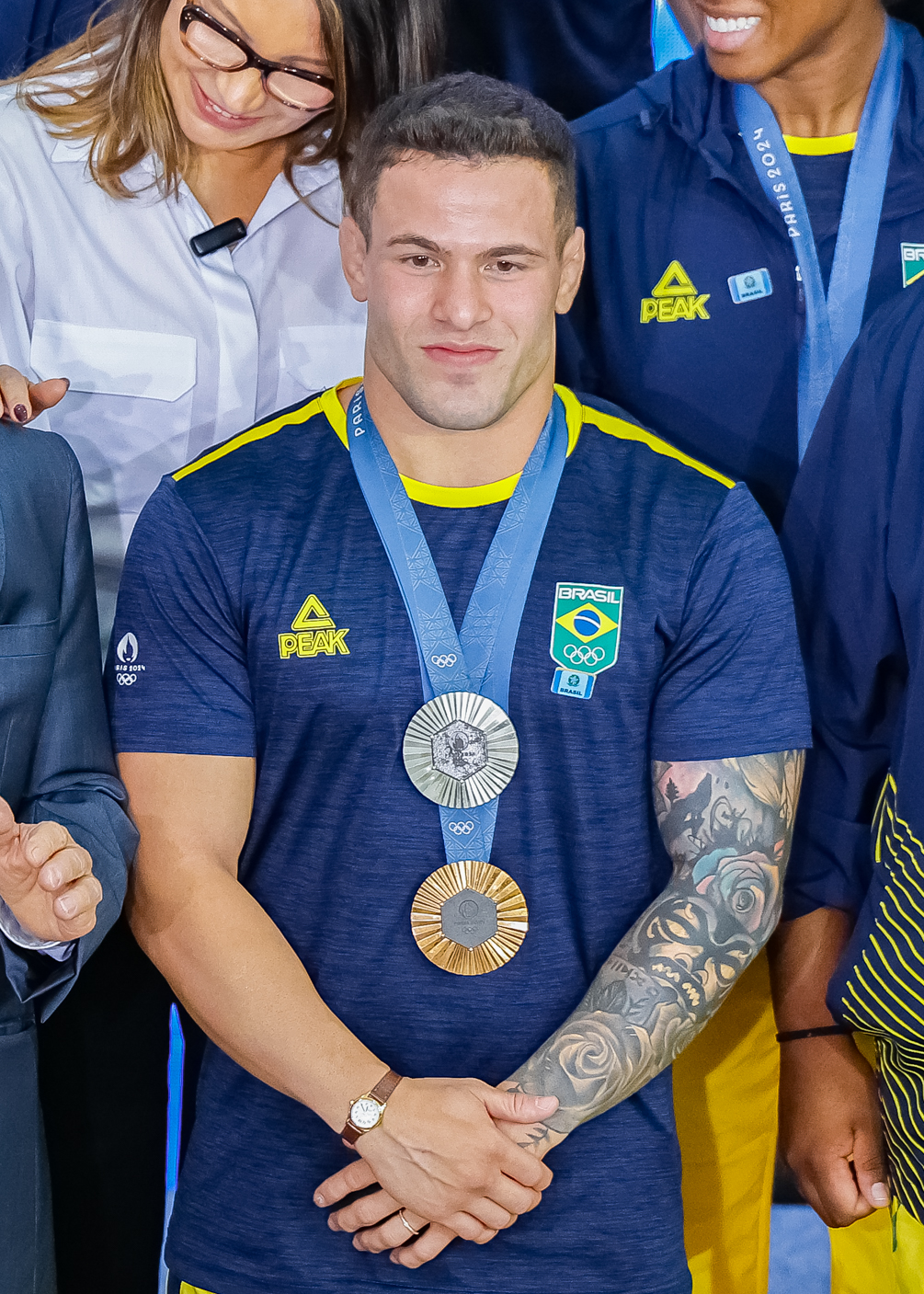
Willian Lima, the first Brazilian to win a medal at the Paris 2024 Olympic Games

=== Swimming ===
The swimming section from Pinheiros is leading in Brazil. It has won a record 13 times the two main competitions in Brazil, the Maria Lenk Trophy and the José Finkel Trophy.

Manuel dos Santos won 100 m freestyle bronze at the Olympics 1960 in Rome. Freestyle swimmer Gustavo Borges won silver and bronze medals in the Olympics of 1992, 1996 and 2000. Cesar Cielo won short-distance freestyle gold and bronze in 2008 in Beijing.

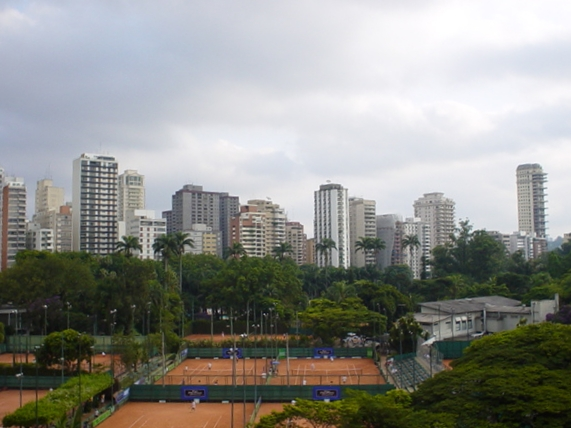
View across the tennis courts.

=== Tennis ===
By 1903, SC Germânia already had its first two tennis courts. In his later years, founding president Hans Nobiling became an enthusiastic tennis player and the club's interest in tennis grew dramatically. In 1924, SC Germânia won the State's top tennis club honor, the "Taça Brasil", or the Brazil Cup. The club was one of the founders of the state association "Federação Paulista de Tênis." By 1949, the now EC Pinheiros had 14 courts and was the largest tennis facility in Brazil. Today, EC Pinheiros has 24 courts, two of which are covered for play during inclement weather, 22 of the courts are clay courts and the other 2 are hardcourts. Several times, the club has served as the host of matches for the Davis Cup, most notably at the 1969 edition of the Americas Zone, the 1991 edition of the World Group qualifying round and Brazil v. India in 2010. The club's facilities also have served as venue for the Banana Bowl, a Grand Slam -event for junior players between 16 and 18 years of age.

The club has also hosted other important tennis championships such as the 2017 Brasil Open, an ATP level competition and the 22nd edition of the Fed Cup, the most important women's tennis tournament by nations, held from July 15 to 22, 1984.

Pinheiros has tennis as one of the most popular sports practiced by its members, with several professional athletes in the discipline having represented the club and trained at its facilities throughout its history

In 1956, Ingrid Metzner from EC Pinheiros and a Rio de Janeiro native who began training at Pinheiros at the age of nine, then aged 19, was the first female Brazilian participant at the Wimbledon Championships. She was also the first Brazilian to compete at the French Open. Metzner partnered with Maria Esther Bueno at the 1955 Pan American Games, where she won bronze medals in both singles and doubles.

Among other Pinheiros’ tennis idols are Vera Cleto Giugni, one of the club's honorary athletes who competed in the Wimbledon Championships and the French Open, being considered one of the best tennis players in South America during her time; Sylvia Nieszner Villari, who won the São Paulo Women's Tennis Championship in the Junior category in 1943 and bronze in doubles at the Pan-American Tennis Championship in 1951, held in São Paulo. More recently, young talent Camila Bossi achieved first place in doubles and second in singles at the Banana Bowl and the Gerdau Cup in 2015, and Beatriz Haddad Maia, a native of São Paulo, former WTA world number 10 in both singles and doubles, finalist in doubles at the Australian Open with Anna Danilina in 2022, and a singles semifinalist at the French Open in 2023, who partially trained at Pinheiros in her formation years.

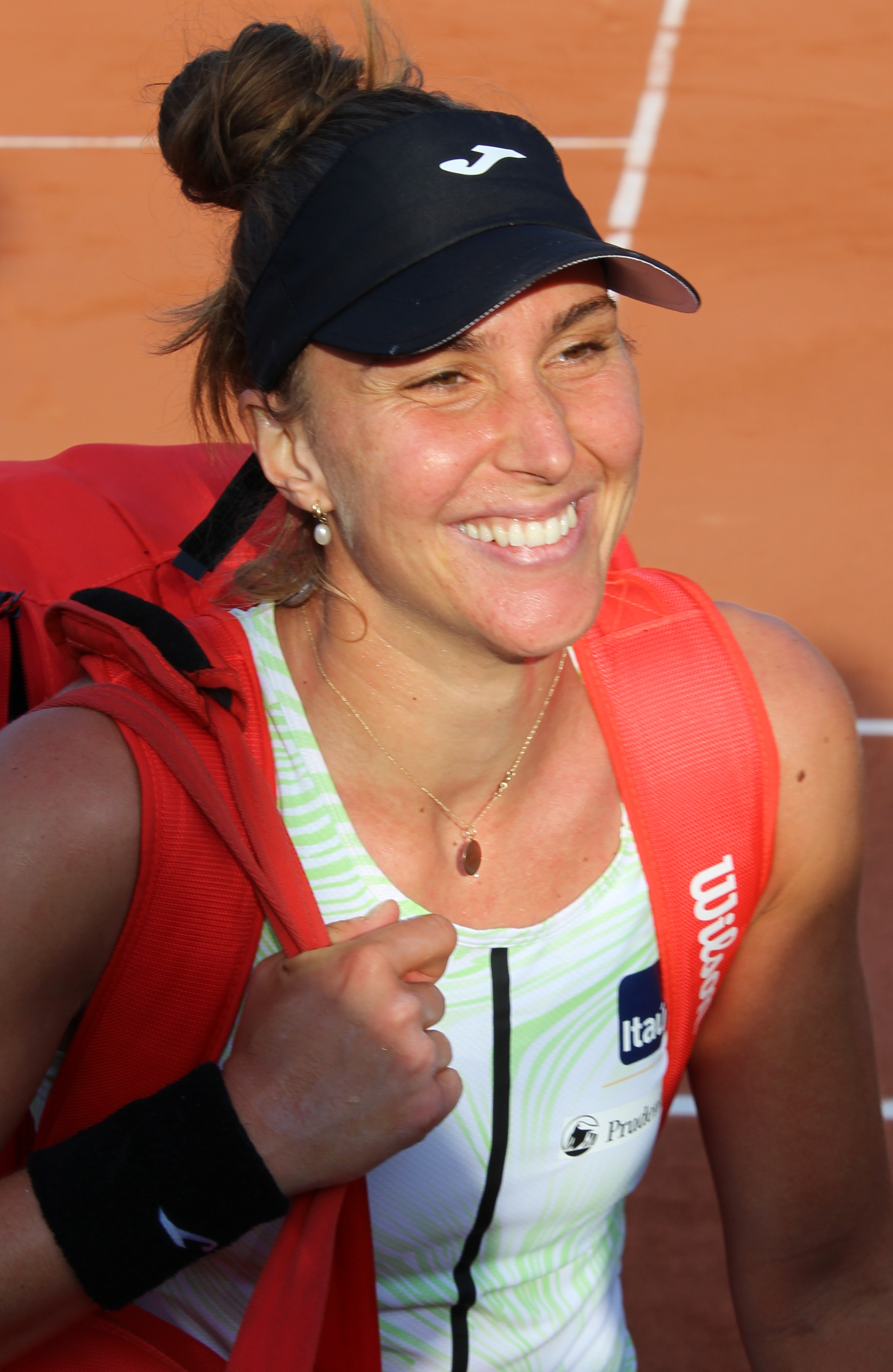
Beatriz Haddad Maia, a tennis player who partially trained at Pinheiros

In 2007, the club's tennis association had 3,000 members.

=== Volleyball ===
Brazil is a leading country in volleyball, and the ladies volleyball department is playing in Brazil's first division, the Superliga. In 2010, the men's team played with their sponsored name as Pinheiros/Sky, but the men's team is not active currently. The ladies formed a union with Mackenzie University, and therefore played as Pinheiros/Mackenzie.

=== Track and field ===
Track and field was practically right from the beginning part of SC Germânia. Hermann Friese, who was German Champion over 1500 metres in 1902 and joined Germânia in 1903 was in 1907 Brazil's sole representative at an international tournament in Montevideo, Uruguay where he won two competitions and finished second in a third one. In 1924 Germânia was co-founder of the state athletics association Federação Paulista de Atletismo. By the end of the 1930s the club had a 70 strong group of athletes and dominated track and field in Brazil. Apart from many South-American records it held almost all national records.

At the Games in 1932 in Los Angeles Lúcio de Castro became the first athlete from EC Pinheiros to participate at Olympic Games. In the pole vault he cleared 3,90 metres and finished sixth.

João Carlos de Oliveira won triple jump bronze 1976 in Montreal and 1980 in Moscow. At the 1975 Pan American Games in Mexico he won the long jump with 8.19 metres and surpassed the triple jump world record of Viktor Saneyev by 45 centimetres reaching 17.89 metres. This mark held for almost six years, when the US-American Willie Banks extended it to 17.97 which should stand for ten years. 18 metres should not be exceeded before mid 1995.

Lately the club's athletes lined-up as EC Pinheiro/Asics. Fabiano Peçanha, 2009 South-American champion over 800 metres, and Sabine Heitling, in the same year continental champion over 3000 metres steeplechase, belong to the most successful athletes of the club in more recent years.

The new generation of idols includes Altobeli da Silva, Adriana Aparecida, Alison dos Santos, and Darlan Romani. To give an idea of the club's strength, at the London Olympic Games in 2012, Athletics was the largest Pinheiros delegation, with eight athletes and one coach.

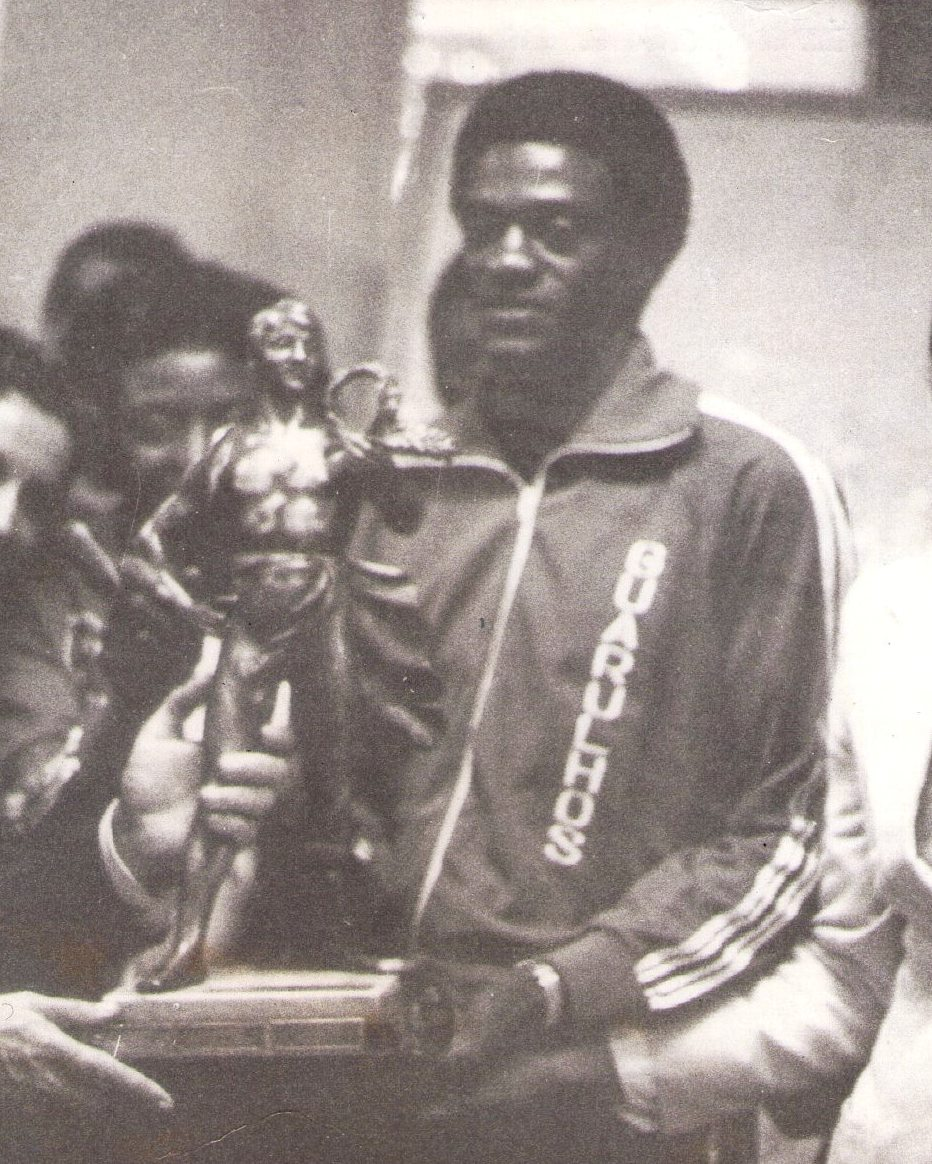
João Carlos de Oliveira, known as João do Pulo

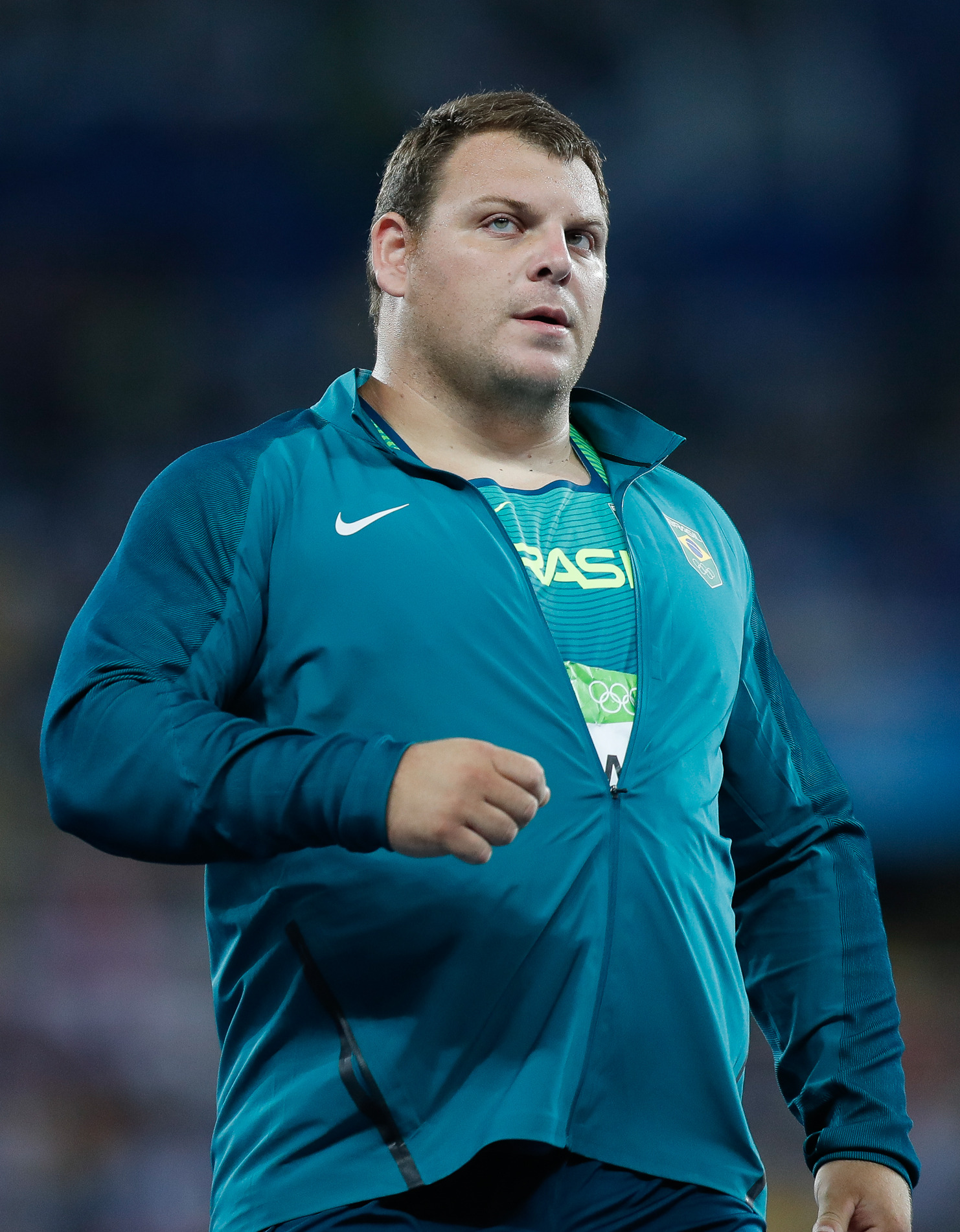
Darlan Romani during the Rio 2016 Olympic Games

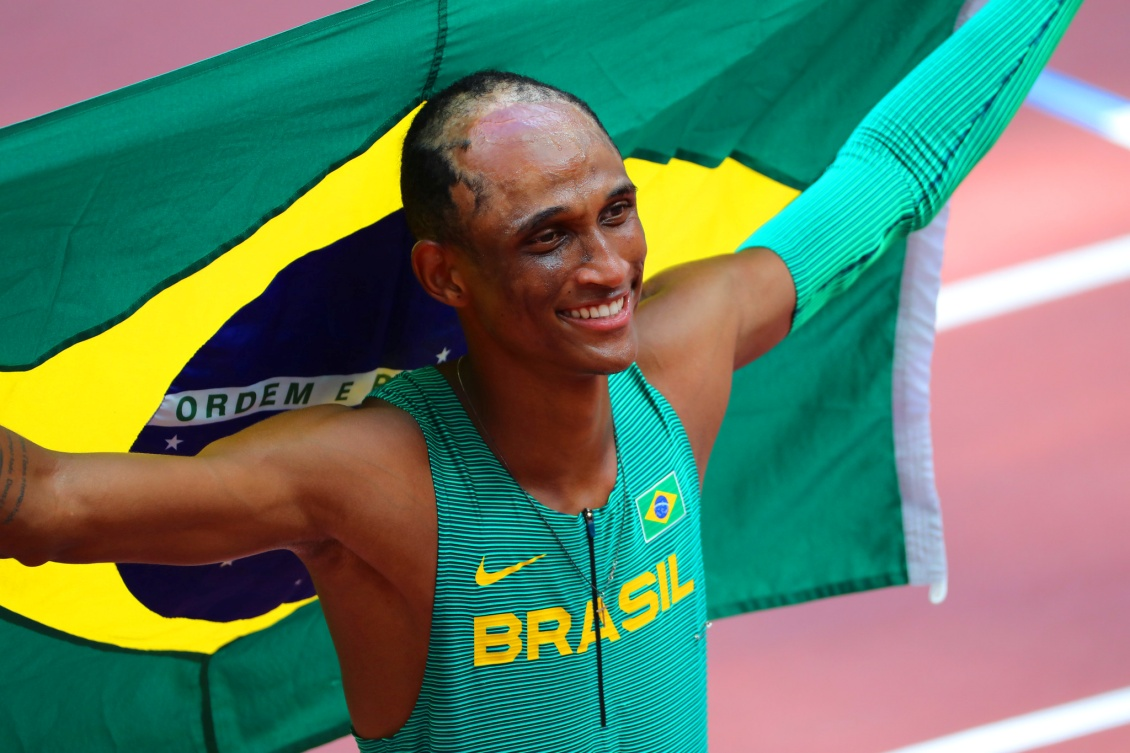
Alison dos Santos celebrating his bronze medal at the Tokyo 2020 Olympic Games

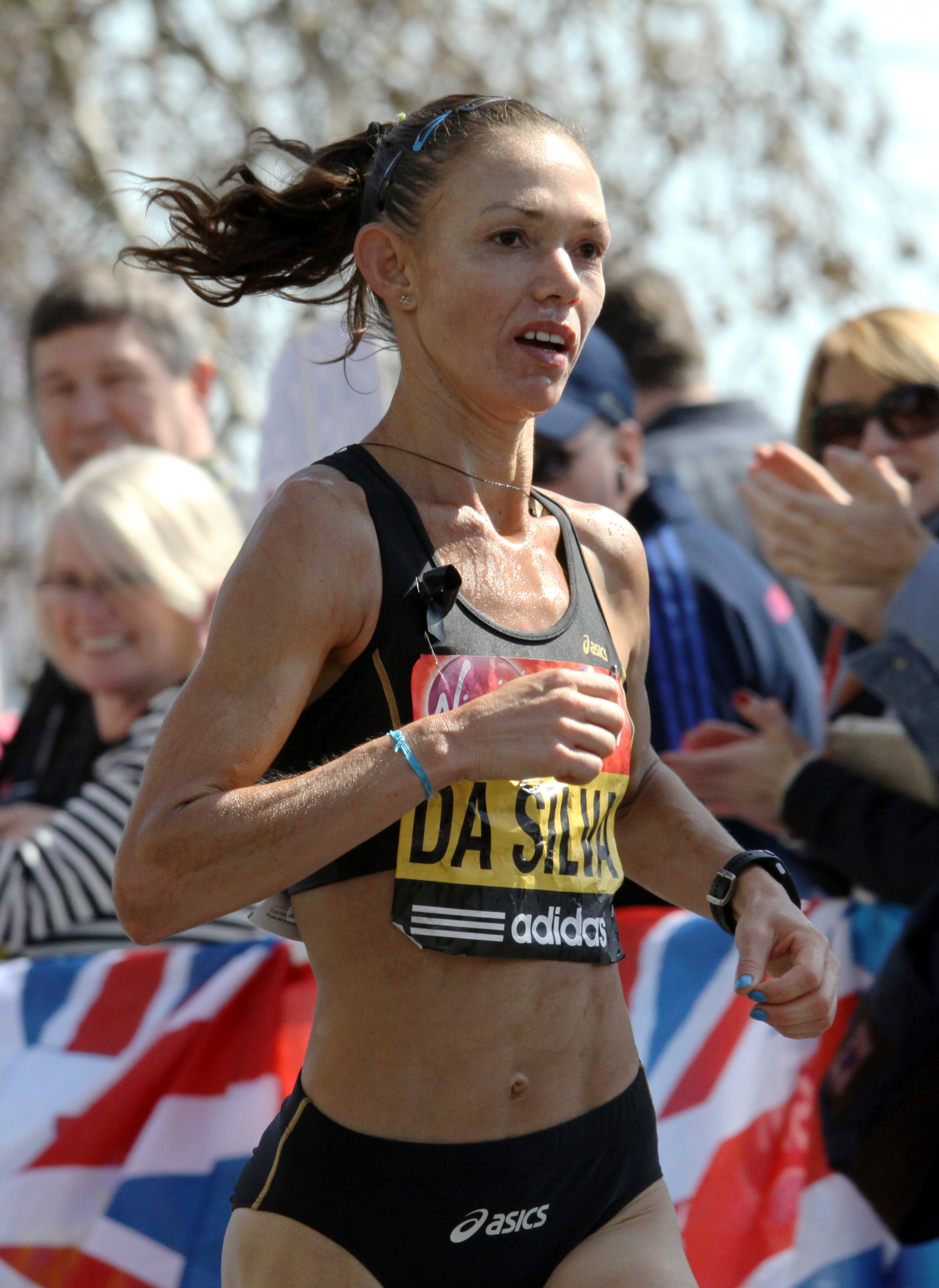
Adriana Aparecida competing in the 2013 London Marathon

=== Water polo ===
Water polo has been played at EC Pinheiros since 1949. Soon players from the club were also selected to play in the national team, and represent Brazil at the Olympic Games and many other international events, such as the 1963 Pan American Games, which was won by Brazil. After winning the Brazilian Cup in 2004, Pinheiros also won the first edition of the national league, the Liga Nacional de Pólo Aquático in 2008.

== Honours ==
- Campeonato Paulista
  - Winners (2): 1906, 1916
  - Runners-up (3): 1905, 1908, 1926
