= 2020 International Swimming League =

- League: International Swimming League
- Sport: Swimming
- Duration: 16 October – 22 November 2020
- Teams: 10

Regular season
- Season champions: Cali Condors
- Season MVP: Caeleb Dressel (Cali Condors)

Final Match
- Champions: Cali Condors
- Finals MVP: Caeleb Dressel (Cali Condors)

Seasons
- 2019 2021

The 2020 International Swimming League was the second edition of the International Swimming League, a professional swimming league, established in 2019. It comprised ten teams composed of both women and men. The league, due to COVID-19 pandemic travel restrictions, consisted of thirteen short course swimming meets which took place in the city of Budapest, Hungary.

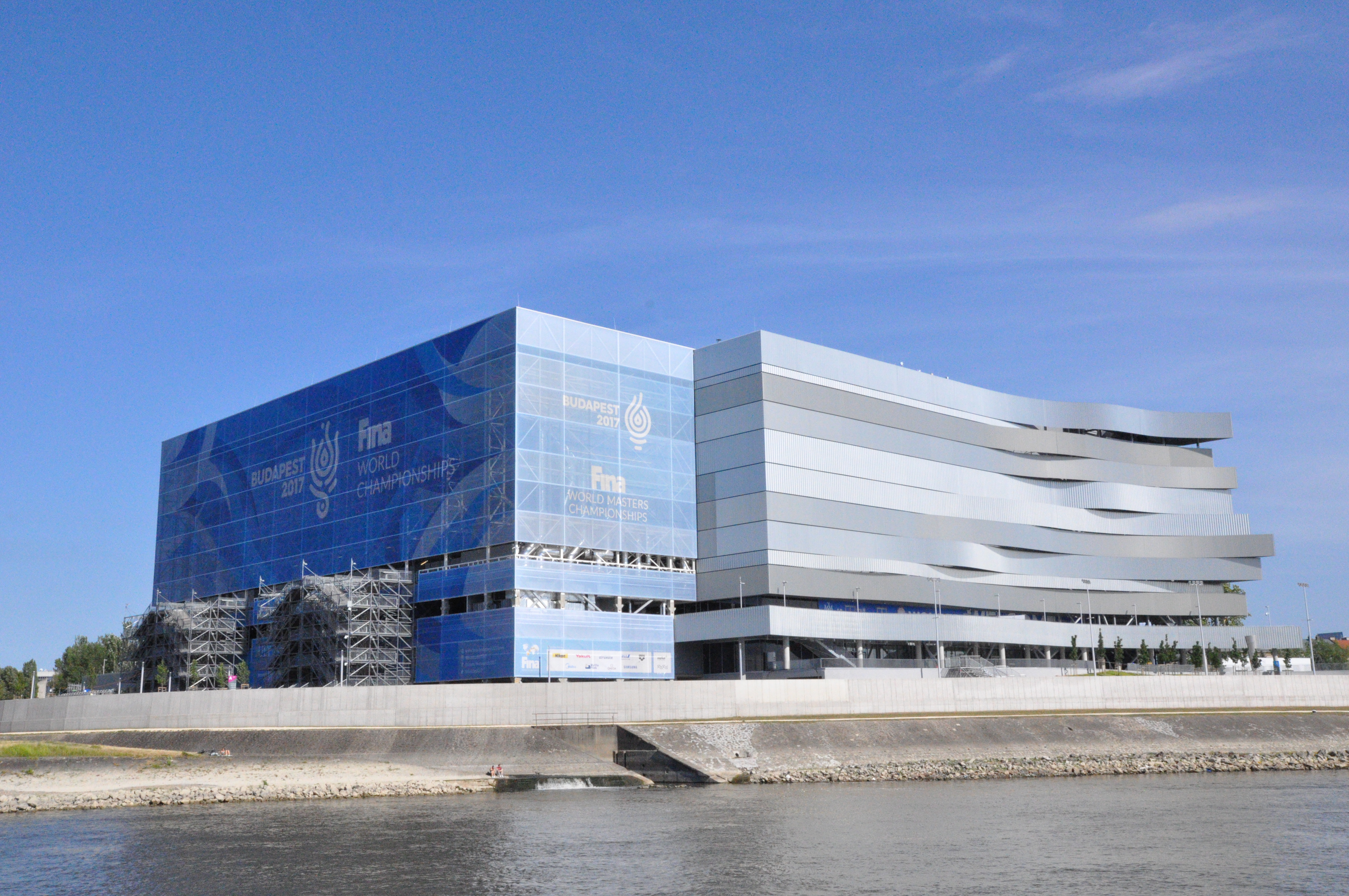
Danube Arena hosted the Final of this year event.

The US-based Cali Condors won the Grand Final, with Caeleb Dressel winning the season MVP award.

== Schedule ==
The schedule consisted of ten regular-season meets, followed by two Semifinals and a Final Match in Budapest.

Dates	Location	Venue	Teams	Results	MVP
Regular season
16–17 October	(Hungary) Budapest	Danube Arena	(United States) Cali Condors (France) Energy Standard (United States) LA Current (United States) New York Breakers		(United States) Lilly King ( (United States) Cali Condors); 87.5 pts
18–19 October	(Hungary) Budapest	Danube Arena	(Italy) Aqua Centurions (United States) DC Trident (United Kingdom) London Roar (Hungary) Team Iron		(Netherlands) Ranomi Kromowidjojo ( (Hungary) Team Iron); 57 pts
24–25 October	(Hungary) Budapest	Danube Arena	(Italy) Aqua Centurion (United States) LA Current (Canada) Toronto Titans (Japan) Tokyo Frog Kings		(France) Béryl Gastaldello ( (United States) LA Current); 78 pts
26–27 October	(Hungary) Budapest	Danube Arena	(United States) Cali Condors (United States) DC Trident (Hungary) Team Iron (United States) New York Breakers		(United States) Caeleb Dressel ( (United States) Cali Condors); 75 pts
30–31 October	(Hungary) Budapest	Danube Arena	(United States) DC Trident (United States) LA Current (United Kingdom) London Roar (Japan) Tokyo Frog Kings		(United States) Tom Shields ( (United States) LA Current); 62.5 pts
1–2 November	(Hungary) Budapest	Danube Arena	(Italy) Aqua Centurions (France) Energy Standard (United States) New York Breakers (Canada) Toronto Titans		(Hong Kong) Siobhán Haughey ( (France) Energy Standard); 61.5 pts
5–6 November (1)	(Hungary) Budapest	Danube Arena	(United States) DC Trident (France) Energy Standard (Hungary) Team Iron (Canada) Toronto Titans		(Turkey) Hüseyin Emre Sakçı ( (Hungary) Team Iron); 51 pts
5–6 November (2)	(Hungary) Budapest	Danube Arena	(United States) Cali Condors (United Kingdom) London Roar (United States) New York Breakers (Japan) Tokyo Frog Kings		(United States) Caeleb Dressel ( (United States) Cali Condors); 87.5 pts
9–10 November (1)	(Hungary) Budapest	Danube Arena	(France) Energy Standard (Hungary) Team Iron (Canada) Toronto Titans (Japan) Tokyo Frog Kings		(Sweden) Sarah Sjöström ( (France) Energy Standard); 76 pts
9–10 November (2)	(Hungary) Budapest	Danube Arena	(Italy) Aqua Centurions (United States) Cali Condors (United States) LA Current (United Kingdom) London Roar		(United States) Caeleb Dressel ( (United States) Cali Condors); 80.5 pts
Semifinals
14–15 November	(Hungary) Budapest	Danube Arena	(France) Energy Standard (United Kingdom) London Roar (United States) New York Breakers (Japan) Tokyo Frog Kings		(Sweden) Sarah Sjöström ( (France) Energy Standard); 65 pts
15–16 November	(Hungary) Budapest	Danube Arena	(United States) Cali Condors (United States) LA Current (Hungary) Team Iron (Canada) Toronto Titans		(United States) Caeleb Dressel ( (United States) Cali Condors); 91 pts
Final Match
21–22 November	(Hungary) Budapest	Danube Arena	(United States) Cali Condors (France) Energy Standard (United States) LA Current (United Kingdom) London Roar		(United States) Caeleb Dressel ( (United States) Cali Condors); 96 pts

=== Events schedule ===
A total of 37 races were held in each match (the 4 × 50 m mixed medley relay acted as a tie breaker).

Day 1					Day 2				
No.	Event	F	M	X	No.	Event	F	M	X
1	100m Butterfly	●			20	100m Freestyle	●		
2	100m Butterfly		●		21	100m Freestyle		●	
3	50m Breaststroke	●			22	100m Breaststroke	●		
4	50m Breaststroke		●		23	100m Breaststroke		●	
5	400m Individual Medley	●			24	400m Freestyle	●		
6	400m Individual Medley		●		25	400m Freestyle		●	
7	4 × 100 m Freestyle Relay	●			26	4 × 100 m Medley Relay	●		
19	4 × 100 m Freestyle Relay		●		27	200m Individual Medley		●	
8	200m Backstroke	●			28	200m Individual Medley	●		
9	200m Backstroke		●		29	50m Butterfly		●	
10	50m Freestyle	●			30	50m Butterfly	●		
11	50m Freestyle		●		31	100m Backstroke		●	
12	4 × 100 m Medley Relay		●		32	100m Backstroke	●		
13	200m Freestyle		●		33	4x100 Freestyle Relay			●
14	200m Freestyle	●			34	200m Butterfly	●		
15	50m Backstroke		●		35	200m Butterfly		●	
16	50m Backstroke	●			36	Freestyle Skins	●		
17	200m Breaststroke		●		37	Freestyle Skins		●	
18	200m Breaststroke	●			38	4 × 50 m Freestyle relay			●

== Teams ==
ISL teams could have a maximum roster of 32 athletes for the 2019 season, with a suggested size of each club's traveling roster of 28 (14 men and 14 women). Each club had a captain and a vice-captain of different gender.

(United States) Cali Condors
Men	Women
(Jordan) Khader Baqlah	(United States) Haley Anderson
(United States) Bowe Becker	(United States) Erika Brown
(United States) Gunnar Bentz	(United States) Veronica Burchill
(Poland) Marcin Cieślak	(United States) Kelsi Dahlia
(United States) Kevin Cordes	(United States) Sherridon Dressel
(United States) Caeleb Dressel (C)	(United States) Kelly Fertel
(United States) Nic Fink	(United States) Hali Flickinger
(United States) Townley Haas	(United States) Molly Hannis
(United States) Tate Jackson	(Australia) Meg Harris
(Poland) Radosław Kawęcki	(United States) Natalie Hinds
(Australia) Mitch Larkin	(United States) Lilly King
(Australia) Clyde Lewis	(United States) Melanie Margalis
(Poland) Kacper Majchrzak	(United States) Lia Neal
(Ecuador) Tomas Peribonio	(United States) Beata Nelson
(United States) Justin Ress	(United States) Allison Schmitt
(United States) Coleman Stewart	(United States) Meghan Small
(United Kingdom) Mark Szaranek	(United States) Olivia Smoliga (vice-captain)
(Chinese Taipei) Eddie Wang	(Australia) Ariarne Titmus

(United States) DC Trident
Men	Women
(United States) Zach Apple	(Canada) Bailey Andison
(Israel) Meiron Cheruti	(United States) Emma Barksdale
(United States) Tommy Cope	(United States) Amy Bilquist
(United States) Abrahm DeVine	(Germany) Kathrin Delmer
(United States) Ian Finnerty	(United States) Bethany Galat
(United States) Zane Grothe	(New Zealand) Ali Galyer
(United States) Zach Harting	(United States) Margo Geer
(Egypt) Mohamed Hassan	(United States) Leah Gingrich
(United States) Robert Howard	(United States) Madison Kennedy (C)
(United States) Andrew Loy	(United States) Lindsey Kozelsky
(Brazil) Matheus Santana	(United States) Linnea Mack
(United States) Conner McHugh	(Russia) Rozaliya Nasretdinova
(Russia) Mark Nikolaev	(United States) Kylee Perry
(United States) Jacob Pebley	(Singapore) Ting Wen Quah
(United States) Giles Smith (vice-captain)	(Philippines) Remedy Rule
(Serbia) Velimir Stjepanović	(United States) Miranda Tucker

(United States) New York Breakers
Men	Women
(Brazil) Brandonn Almeida	(Denmark) Signe Bro
(United States) Michael Andrew (vice-captain)	(Russia) Svetlana Chimrova
(Austria) Felix Auböck	(United States) Emily Escobedo
(New Zealand) Lewis Clareburt	(United Kingdom) Chloe Golding
(Germany) Marco Koch	(Australia) Abbey Harkin
(United Kingdom) Joe Litchfield	(Hungary) Boglárka Kapás
(Australia) Cameron McEvoy	(Hungary) Ajna Késely
(Poland) Michał Poprawa	(Denmark) Jeanette Ottesen (C)
(South Africa) Chris Reid	(United Kingdom) Molly Renshaw
(United Kingdom) Matthew Richards	(Australia) Mikkayla Sheridan
(Poland) Jakub Skierka	(Russia) Arina Surkova
(Australia) Brendon Smith	(Poland) Alicja Tchórz
(Poland) Jan Świtkowski	(Russia) Daria S. Ustinova
(Hungary) Ádám Telegdy	(United Kingdom) Sarah Vasey
(Belgium) Pieter Timmers	(United States) Tevyn Waddell
(United Kingdom) Jacob Whittle	(Poland) Kasia Wasick
(Germany) Damian Wierling	(United Kingdom) Abbie Wood
(United Kingdom) James Wilby

(United States) LA Current
Men	Women
(Trinidad and Tobago) Dylan Carter	(United States) Ali DeLoof
(Brazil) Marco Antonio Ferreira Jr.	(New Zealand) Helena Gasson
(Greece) Kristian Golomeev	(France) Béryl Gastaldello (vice-captain)
(Argentina) Santiago Grassi	(Israel) Anastasia Gorbenko
(Germany) Jacob Heidtmann	(United States) Alyssa Marsh
(United States) Will Licon	(United States) Katie McLaughlin
(United States) Ryan Murphy (C)	(Israel) Andi Murez
(United States) Josh Prenot	(United States) Claire Rasmus
(United States) Maxime Rooney	(United States) Makayla Sargent
(Brazil) Fernando Scheffer	(Argentina) Julia Sebastián
(United States) Andrew Seliskar	(Canada) Kierra Smith
(United States) Tom Shields	(United States) Kendyl Stewart
(Brazil) Felipe França Silva	(United States) Aly Tetzloff
(South Africa) Zane Waddell	(United States) Abbey Weitzeil
(Norway) Tomoe Zenimoto Hvas	(Australia) Madi Wilson
(Greece) Apostolos Christou

(Canada) Toronto Titans
Men	Women
(United States) Michael Chadwick	(United States) (Czech Republic) Anika Apostalon
(Canada) Mack Darragh	(United States) Lisa Bratton
(Russia) Sergey Fesikov	(Canada) Tessa Cieplucha
(Ukraine) Andrii Govorov	(Sweden) Michelle Coleman
(Canada) Brent Hayden (Vice-captain)	(Brazil) Jhennifer Conceição
(Canada) Yuri Kisil	(Russia) Anna Egorova
(Canada) Finlay Knox	(United States) Claire Fisch
(Russia) Aleksandr Krasnykh	(United Kingdom) Candice Hall
(Iceland) Anton McKee	(Sweden) Louise Hansson
(United Kingdom) Jay Lelliott	(South Africa) Tayla Lovemore
(Russia) Daniil Pasynkov	(Canada) Kylie Masse (C)
(Sweden) Erik Persson	(Luxembourg) Julie Meynen
(United States) Blake Pieroni	(Canada) Emily Overholt
(Canada) Cole Pratt	(Canada) Rebecca Smith
(Republic of Ireland) Shane Ryan	(United Kingdom) Jocelyn Ulyett
(Canada) Eli Wall	(Canada) Kelsey Wog

(France) Energy Standard
Men	Women
(Lithuania) Simonas Bilis	(United States) Madeline Banic
(United States) Matt Grevers	(Denmark) Pernille Blume
(Russia) Kliment Kolesnikov	(United Kingdom) Imogen Clark
(South Africa) Chad le Clos (C)	(United Kingdom) Georgia Davies
(Brazil) Felipe Lima	(Turkey) Viktoriya Zeynep Güneş
(United Kingdom) Max Litchfield	(Canada) Mary-Sophie Harvey
(France) Florent Manaudou	(Hong Kong) Siobhán Haughey
(United Kingdom) Ben Proud	(Netherlands) Femke Heemskerk
(Lithuania) Danas Rapsys	(United Kingdom) Lucy Hope
(Russia) Evgeny Rylov	(Hungary) Zsuzsanna Jakabos
(Ukraine) Sergey Shevtsov	(United States) Breeja Larson
(Belarus) Ilya Shymanovich	(Italy) Benedetta Pilato
(Lithuania) Andrius Sidlauskas	(Australia) Emily Seebohm
(Russia) Maxim Stupin	(Belarus) Anastasiya Shkurdai
(Russia) Andrei Zhilkin	(Sweden) Sarah Sjöström (C)
(Estonia) Kregor Zirk	(Netherlands) Tamara van Vliet

(Hungary) Team Iron
Men	Women
(Brazil) Guilherme Basseto	(Russia) Veronika Andrusenko
(Netherlands) Thom de Boer	(Denmark) Emilie Beckmann
(Romania) Robert Glință (vice-captain)	(Spain) Mireia Belmonte
(Germany) Ramon Klenz	(Australia) Jessica Hansen
(Hungary) Maksim Lobanovskii	(France) Mélanie Henique
(Belarus) Artyom Machekin	(United Kingdom) Isabella Hindley
(France) Clément Mignon	(Hungary) Katinka Hosszú (C)
(Hungary) Kristóf Milák	(Finland) Ida Hulkko
(United Kingdom) Ross Murdoch	(Netherlands) Ranomi Kromowidjojo
(Italy) Marco Orsi	(Finland) Jenna Laukkanen
(Algeria) Oussama Sahnoune	(Canada) Danica Ludlow
(Brazil) Leonardo Santos	(Austria) Caroline Pilhatsch
(Brazil) Nicholas Santos	(Switzerland) Maria Ugolkova
(Turkey) Hüseyin Emre Sakçı	(Russia) Daria Ustinova
(Israel) Yakov Toumarkin	(Netherlands) Valerie Van Roon
(Hungary) Dávid Verrasztó	(Ukraine) Daryna Zevina
	(Belarus) Alina Zmushka

(United Kingdom) London Roar
Men	Women
(Australia) Kyle Chalmers	(United Kingdom) Freya Anderson
(United Kingdom) Elliot Clogg	(Australia) Minna Atherton
(United Kingdom) Tom Dean	(Australia) Bronte Campbell
(Germany) Christian Diener	(Australia) Cate Campbell
(United Kingdom) Luke Greenbank	(United Kingdom) Kathleen Dawson
(Republic of Ireland) Darragh Greene	(United Kingdom) Holly Hibbott
(Brazil) Guilherme Guido	(United Kingdom) Anna Hopkin
(United Kingdom) James Guy	(Russia) Maria Kameneva
(Germany) Marius Kusch	(United Kingdom) Emily Large
(Brazil) Vini Lanza	(United States) Annie Lazor
(France) Amaury Leveaux	(Australia) Emma McKeon
(United Kingdom) Scott McLay	(United Kingdom) Siobhan-Marie O'Connor
(Japan) Katsumi Nakamura	(Canada) Sydney Pickrem (C)
(United Kingdom) Adam Peaty (C)	(Netherlands) Kira Toussaint
(Russia) Kirill Prigoda	(France) Marie Wattel
(United Kingdom) Duncan Scott	(United Kingdom) Harriet West
(Greece) Andreas Vazaios	(United Kingdom) Aimee Willmott
(Russia) Mikhail Vekovishchev

(Italy) Aqua Centurions
Men	Women
(Brazil) Breno Correia	(Canada) Haley Black
(Brazil) Marcelo Chierighini	(United Kingdom) Tain Bruce
(Brazil) Leonardo de Deus	(Hungary) Katalin Burián
(Germany) Philip Heintz	(Italy) Martina Carraro
(Italy) Nicolò Martinenghi	(Italy) Arianna Castiglioni
(Brazil) Luiz Altamir Melo	(Greece) Theodora Drakou
(Italy) Alessandro Miressi	(Belgium) Valentine Dumont
(Greece) Apostolos Papastamos	(United Kingdom) Kathryn Greenslade
(Italy) Matteo Rivolta	(United States) Katrina Konopka
(Ukraine) Mykhailo Romanchuk	(Brazil) Etiene Medeiros
(Italy) Fabio Santi	(Spain) Lidón Muñoz
(Brazil) Gabriel Santos	(Brazil) Larissa Oliveira
(Italy) Fabio Scozzoli (vice-captain)	(Italy) Federica Pellegrini (C)
(Brazil) Pedro Spajari	(Italy) Stefania Pirozzi
(Hungary) Szebasztián Szabó	(Switzerland) Alexandra Touretski
	(Hungary) Evelyn Verrasztó

(Japan) Tokyo Frog Kings
Men	Women
(Brazil) Bruno Fratus	(Japan) Reona Aoki
(Japan) Kosuke Hagino	(Japan) Tomoki Aoki
(Japan) Tomoro Honda	(United States) Catherine DeLoof
(Japan) Ryosuke Irie	(Japan) Suzuka Hasegawa
(Japan) Takeshi Kawamoto	(Japan) Chihiro Igarashi
(Japan) Yuki Kobori	(Japan) Runa Imai
(Japan) Yasuhiro Koseki	(Czech Republic) Simona Kubová
(Japan) Kosuke Matsui	(Greece) Anna Ntountounaki
(Japan) Katsuhiro Matsumoto	(Japan) Yui Ohashi
(Japan) Naoki Mizunuma	(Japan) Natsumi Sakai
(Russia) Vladimir Morozov	(Japan) Aya Sato
(Venezuela) Cristian Quintero	(Japan) Sakiko Shimizu
(Japan) Shoma Sato	(Japan) Rio Shirai
(Japan) Shinru Shioura	(United States) Leah Smith
(South Africa) Brad Tandy	(Japan) Ai Soma
(Canada) Markus Thormeyer	(Japan) Miho Teramura

== Standings ==
2020 ISL Final Match

Pos.	Team	Total score
1	(United States) Cali Condors	561.5
2	(France) Energy Standard	464.5
3	(United Kingdom) London Roar	391.0
4	(United States) LA Current	298.0

2020 Semifinals

The teams in yellow qualified to the final match, two from each semifinal.

Pos.	Semifinal	Team	Total score
1	B	(United States) Cali Condors	650.5
2	A	(France) Energy Standard	580
3	A	(United Kingdom) London Roar	517.5
4	B	(United States) LA Current	462
5	A	(Japan) Tokyo Frog Kings	380.5
6	B	(Hungary) Team Iron	340.5
7	B	(Canada) Toronto Titans	303
8	A	(United States) NY Breakers	239

2020 ISL Regular season

Pos.	Team	Budapest 1 (Hungary)	Budapest 2 (Hungary)	Budapest 3 (Hungary)	Budapest 4 (Hungary)	Budapest 5 (Hungary)	Budapest 6 (Hungary)	Budapest 7 (Hungary)	Budapest 8 (Hungary)	Budapest 9 (Hungary)	Budapest 10 (Hungary)	Total score	Points
1	(United States) Cali Condors	554			610.5				507		558	2229.5	16
2	(France) Energy Standard	456					609	613		573.5		2251.5	15
3	(United Kingdom) London Roar		610.5			499			491.5		398	1999	13
4	(United States) LA Current	360		535		478.5					495	1868.5	12
5	(Hungary) Iron		393.5		418.5			448		415.5		1675.5	11
6	(Japan) Tokyo Frog Kings			506.5		446.5			419	428		1800	10
7	(Canada) Toronto Titans			401			448	391		289		1529	8
8	(United States) NY Breakers	261			394		354.5		296.5			1306	6
9	(United States) DC Trident		351		287	287		256				1181	5
10	(Italy) Aqua Centurions		339	260			290.5				255	1144.5	4

Key
Colour	Result
Gold	Winner
Purple	Did not finish (DNF)
Black	Disqualified (DSQ)
White	Did not start (DNS)
Red	Eliminated (ELM)
Blank	Withdrew entry from the event (WD)

== Event winners ==
=== 50 m freestyle ===
Meet	Men			Women		
Meet	Winner	Team	Time	Winner	Team	Time
Budapest 1	(France) Florent Manaudou	(France) Energy Standard	20.63	(Sweden) Sarah Sjöström	(France) Energy Standard	23.48
Budapest 2	(Hungary) Maxim Lobanovszkij	(Hungary) Iron	20.92	(Netherlands) Ranomi Kromowidjojo	(Hungary) Iron	23.64
Budapest 3	(Russia) Vladimir Morozov	(Japan) Tokyo Frog Kings	20.98	(France) Béryl Gastaldello (United States) Abbey Weitzeil	(United States) LA Current	23.79
Budapest 4	(United States) Caeleb Dressel	(United States) Cali Condors	20.69	(Poland) Kasia Wasick	(United States) New York Breakers	23.43
Budapest 5	(Greece) Kristian Golomeev	(United States) LA Current	20.97	(France) Béryl Gastaldello	(United States) LA Current	23.76
Budapest 6	(France) Florent Manaudou	(France) Energy Standard	20.55	(Poland) Kasia Wasick	(United States) New York Breakers	23.30
Budapest 7	(France) Florent Manaudou	(France) Energy Standard	20.77	(Sweden) Sarah Sjöström	(France) Energy Standard	23.41
Budapest 8	(United States) Caeleb Dressel	(United States) Cali Condors	20.65	(Poland) Kasia Wasick	(United States) New York Breakers	23.47
Budapest 9	(Brazil) Bruno Fratus	(Japan) Tokyo Frog Kings	20.98	(Sweden) Sarah Sjöström	(France) Energy Standard	23.42
Budapest 10	(United States) Caeleb Dressel	(United States) Cali Condors	20.52	(United States) Abbey Weitzeil	(United States) LA Current	23.45
Budapest SF 1	(France) Florent Manaudou	(France) Energy Standard	20.63	(Sweden) Sarah Sjöström	(France) Energy Standard	23.43
Budapest SF 2	(United States) Caeleb Dressel	(United States) Cali Condors	20.28	(Netherlands) Ranomi Kromowidjojo	(Hungary) Iron	23.37
Budapest F	(United States) Caeleb Dressel	(United States) Cali Condors	20.16	(Sweden) Sarah Sjöström	(France) Energy Standard	23.55

=== 100 m freestyle ===
Meet	Men			Women		
Meet	Winner	Team	Time	Winner	Team	Time
Budapest 1	(United States) Caeleb Dressel	(United States) Cali Condors	45.87	(Sweden) Sarah Sjöström	(France) Energy Standard	51.17
Budapest 2	(United States) Zach Apple	(United States) DC Trident	45.74	(Netherlands) Ranomi Kromowidjojo	(Hungary) Iron	52.00
Budapest 3	(Italy) Alessandro Miressi	(Italy) Aqua Centurions	46.13	(France) Béryl Gastaldello	(United States) LA Current	51.71
Budapest 4	(United States) Zach Apple	(United States) DC Trident	45.94	(Netherlands) Ranomi Kromowidjojo	(Hungary) Iron	51.73
Budapest 5	(United States) Zach Apple	(United States) DC Trident	46.53	(France) Béryl Gastaldello	(United States) LA Current	51.30
Budapest 6	(Italy) Alessandro Miressi	(Italy) Aqua Centurions	46.27	(Hong Kong) Siobhán Haughey	(France) Energy Standard	51.30
Budapest 7	(United States) Zach Apple	(United States) DC Trident	46.50	(Sweden) Sarah Sjöström	(France) Energy Standard	51.32
Budapest 8	(United States) Caeleb Dressel	(United States) Cali Condors	46.12	(United Kingdom) Freya Anderson	(United Kingdom) London Roar	51.87
Budapest 9	(United States) Blake Pieroni	(Canada) Toronto Titans	46.33	(Sweden) Sarah Sjöström	(France) Energy Standard	51.64
Budapest 10	(United States) Caeleb Dressel	(United States) Cali Condors	45.56	(France) Béryl Gastaldello	(United States) LA Current	51.16
Budapest SF 1	(France) Florent Manaudou	(France) Energy Standard	45.92	(Hong Kong) Siobhán Haughey	(France) Energy Standard	51.12
Budapest SF 2	(United States) Caeleb Dressel	(United States) Cali Condors	45.20	(France) Béryl Gastaldello	(United States) LA Current	51.38
Budapest F	(United States) Caeleb Dressel	(United States) Cali Condors	45.08	(France) Béryl Gastaldello	(United States) LA Current	51.38

=== 200 m freestyle ===
Meet	Men			Women		
Meet	Winner	Team	Time	Winner	Team	Time
Budapest 1	(Brazil) Fernando Scheffer	(United States) LA Current	1:42.55	(Hong Kong) Siobhán Haughey	(France) Energy Standard	1:51.67
Budapest 2	(United Kingdom) Duncan Scott	(United Kingdom) London Roar	1:42.74	(France) Marie Wattel	(United Kingdom) London Roar	1:54.65
Budapest 3	(Japan) Katsuhiro Matsumoto	(Japan) Tokyo Frog Kings	1:42.33	(Canada) Rebecca Smith	(Canada) Toronto Titans	1:53.59
Budapest 4	(United States) Townley Haas	(United States) Cali Condors	1:42.57	(United States) Allison Schmitt	(United States) Cali Condors	1:54.41
Budapest 5	(Japan) Katsuhiro Matsumoto	(Japan) Tokyo Frog Kings	1:41.77	(Israel) Andi Murez	(United States) LA Current	1:53.58
Budapest 6	(Lithuania) Danas Rapšys	(France) Energy Standard	1:41.23	(Hong Kong) Siobhán Haughey	(France) Energy Standard	1:51.42
Budapest 7	(Lithuania) Danas Rapšys	(France) Energy Standard	1:42.42	(Hong Kong) Siobhán Haughey	(France) Energy Standard	1:51.88
Budapest 8	(United States) Townley Haas	(United States) Cali Condors	1:41.58	(United Kingdom) Freya Anderson	(United Kingdom) London Roar	1:52.60
Budapest 9	(Lithuania) Danas Rapšys	(France) Energy Standard	1:42.18	(Hong Kong) Siobhán Haughey	(France) Energy Standard	1:51.19
Budapest 10	(United States) Townley Haas	(United States) Cali Condors	1:41.84	(United Kingdom) Freya Anderson	(United Kingdom) London Roar	1:52.82
Budapest SF 1	(United Kingdom) Duncan Scott	(United Kingdom) London Roar	1:40.76	(Hong Kong) Siobhán Haughey	(France) Energy Standard	1:51.36
Budapest SF 2	(United States) Townley Haas	(United States) Cali Condors	1:42.00	(United States) Allison Schmitt	(United States) Cali Condors	1:52.83
Budapest F	(United Kingdom) Duncan Scott	(United Kingdom) London Roar	1:40.25	(Hong Kong) Siobhán Haughey	(France) Energy Standard	1:51.11

=== 400 m freestyle ===
Meet	Men			Women		
Meet	Winner	Team	Time	Winner	Team	Time
Budapest 1	(Lithuania) Danas Rapšys	(France) Energy Standard	3:39.36	(United States) Melanie Margalis	(United States) Cali Condors	3:58.43
Budapest 2	(United States) Zane Grothe	(United States) DC Trident	3:39.79	(Belgium) Valentine Dumont	(Italy) Aqua Centurions	4:00.37
Budapest 3	(Ukraine) Mykhailo Romanchuk	(Italy) Aqua Centurions	3:40.08	(United States) Leah Smith	(Japan) Tokyo Frog Kings	4:00.54
Budapest 4	(Austria) Felix Auböck	(United States) New York Breakers	3:37.48	(United States) Hali Flickinger	(United States) Cali Condors	3:59.84
Budapest 5	(United States) Zane Grothe (Serbia) Velimir Stjepanović	(United States) DC Trident	3:41.46	(United States) Leah Smith	(Japan) Tokyo Frog Kings	4:00.18
Budapest 6	(Lithuania) Danas Rapšys	(France) Energy Standard	3:35.49	(Hong Kong) Siobhán Haughey	(France) Energy Standard	3:58.75
Budapest 7	(Lithuania) Danas Rapšys	(France) Energy Standard	3:40.83	(Hong Kong) Siobhán Haughey	(France) Energy Standard	4:00.58
Budapest 8	(Austria) Felix Auböck	(United States) New York Breakers	3:39.05	(United States) Leah Smith	(Japan) Tokyo Frog Kings	3:59.70
Budapest 9	(Lithuania) Danas Rapšys	(France) Energy Standard	3:39.66	(United States) Leah Smith	(Japan) Tokyo Frog Kings	3:58.65
Budapest 10	(Ukraine) Mykhailo Romanchuk	(Italy) Aqua Centurions	3:38.93	(United States) Hali Flickinger	(United States) Cali Condors	3:59.78
Budapest SF 1	(United Kingdom) Tom Dean	(United Kingdom) London Roar	3:37.87	(United States) Leah Smith	(Japan) Tokyo Frog Kings	3:58.26
Budapest SF 2	(United States) Townley Haas	(United States) Cali Condors	3:41.35	(United States) Hali Flickinger	(United States) Cali Condors	4:00.79
Budapest F	(United Kingdom) Tom Dean	(United Kingdom) London Roar	3:36.56	(United States) Hali Flickinger	(United States) Cali Condors	3:58.77

=== 50 m backstroke ===
Meet	Men			Women		
Meet	Winner	Team	Time	Winner	Team	Time
Budapest 1	(United States) Ryan Murphy	(United States) LA Current	22.99	(United States) Olivia Smoliga	(United States) Cali Condors	25.74
Budapest 2	(Germany) Christian Diener	(United Kingdom) London Roar	22.76	(United States) Linnea Mack	(United States) DC Trident	26.30
Budapest 3	(United States) Ryan Murphy (Republic of Ireland) Shane Ryan	(United States) LA Current (Canada) Toronto Titans	23.06	(France) Béryl Gastaldello	(United States) LA Current	26.52
Budapest 4	(United States) Justin Ress	(United States) Cali Condors	23.28	(United States) Olivia Smoliga	(United States) Cali Condors	25.93
Budapest 5	(Brazil) Guilherme Guido	(United Kingdom) London Roar	22.86	(Netherlands) Kira Toussaint	(United Kingdom) London Roar	25.96
Budapest 6	(Republic of Ireland) Shane Ryan	(Canada) Toronto Titans	22.98	(Canada) Kylie Masse	(Canada) Toronto Titans	26.44
Budapest 7	(Republic of Ireland) Shane Ryan	(Canada) Toronto Titans	22.86	(Canada) Kylie Masse	(Canada) Toronto Titans	26.35
Budapest 8	(United States) Coleman Stewart	(United States) Cali Condors	23.21	(Netherlands) Kira Toussaint	(United Kingdom) London Roar	25.79
Budapest 9	(Japan) Takeshi Kawamoto (Republic of Ireland) Shane Ryan	(Japan) Tokyo Frog Kings (Canada) Toronto Titans	23.10	(Japan) Natsumi Sakai	(Japan) Tokyo Frog Kings	26.24
Budapest 10	(United States) Ryan Murphy	(United States) LA Current	22.75	(United States) Olivia Smoliga	(United States) Cali Condors	25.85
Budapest SF 1	(Brazil) Guilherme Guido	(United Kingdom) London Roar	22.89	(Netherlands) Kira Toussaint	(United Kingdom) London Roar	25.60
Budapest SF 2	(United States) Ryan Murphy	(United States) LA Current	22.76	(United States) Olivia Smoliga	(United States) Cali Condors	25.75
Budapest F	(United States) Ryan Murphy	(United States) LA Current	22.54	(United States) Olivia Smoliga	(United States) Cali Condors	25.83

=== 100 m backstroke ===
Meet	Men			Women		
Meet	Winner	Team	Time	Winner	Team	Time
Budapest 1	(United States) Ryan Murphy	(United States) LA Current	49.62	(United States) Olivia Smoliga	(United States) Cali Condors	55.66
Budapest 2	(Brazil) Guilherme Guido	(United Kingdom) London Roar	49.89	(Netherlands) Kira Toussaint	(United Kingdom) London Roar	56.24
Budapest 3	(Japan) Ryosuke Irie	(Japan) Tokyo Frog Kings	49.91	(Canada) Kylie Masse	(Canada) Toronto Titans	56.38
Budapest 4	(United States) Jacob Pebley	(United States) DC Trident	50.51	(United States) Olivia Smoliga	(United States) Cali Condors	56.23
Budapest 5	(Brazil) Guilherme Guido	(United Kingdom) London Roar	49.57	(Netherlands) Kira Toussaint	(United Kingdom) London Roar	56.36
Budapest 6	(Republic of Ireland) Shane Ryan	(Canada) Toronto Titans	50.45	(Canada) Kylie Masse	(Canada) Toronto Titans	56.14
Budapest 7	(Russia) Kliment Kolesnikov	(France) Energy Standard	49.42	(Canada) Kylie Masse	(Canada) Toronto Titans	56.06
Budapest 8	(Japan) Ryosuke Irie	(Japan) Tokyo Frog Kings	49.82	(Netherlands) Kira Toussaint	(United Kingdom) London Roar	55.68
Budapest 9	(Russia) Kliment Kolesnikov	(France) Energy Standard	49.65	(Canada) Kylie Masse	(Canada) Toronto Titans	56.04
Budapest 10	(United States) Ryan Murphy	(United States) LA Current	49.93	(United States) Olivia Smoliga	(United States) Cali Condors	55.92
Budapest SF 1	(Russia) Kliment Kolesnikov	(France) Energy Standard	49.38	(Netherlands) Kira Toussaint	(United Kingdom) London Roar	55.90
Budapest SF 2	(Romania) Robert Glință	(Hungary) Iron	49.64	(United States) Olivia Smoliga	(United States) Cali Condors	55.99
Budapest F	(Russia) Kliment Kolesnikov	(France) Energy Standard	48.82	(United States) Olivia Smoliga	(United States) Cali Condors	55.04

=== 200 m backstroke ===
Meet	Men			Women		
Meet	Winner	Team	Time	Winner	Team	Time
Budapest 1	(Poland) Radosław Kawęcki	(United States) Cali Condors	1:48.51	(Australia) Emily Seebohm	(France) Energy Standard	2:02.70
Budapest 2	(Germany) Christian Diener	(United Kingdom) London Roar	1:49.51	(United States) Annie Lazor	(United Kingdom) London Roar	2:18.85
Budapest 3	(United States) Ryan Murphy	(United States) LA Current	1:48.40	(United States) Lisa Bratton	(Canada) Toronto Titans	2:01.74
Budapest 4	(Poland) Radosław Kawęcki	(United States) Cali Condors	1:48.23	(United States) Beata Nelson	(United States) Cali Condors	2:01.31
Budapest 5	(United States) Ryan Murphy	(United States) LA Current	1:48.03	(United States) Amy Bilquist	(United States) DC Trident	2:01.29
Budapest 6	(Russia) Evgeny Rylov	(France) Energy Standard	1:48.31	(United States) Lisa Bratton	(Canada) Toronto Titans	2:00.99
Budapest 7	(Russia) Evgeny Rylov	(France) Energy Standard	1:48.69	(Australia) Emily Seebohm	(France) Energy Standard	2:01.56
Budapest 8	(Poland) Radosław Kawęcki	(United States) Cali Condors	1:48.12	(United States) Beata Nelson	(United States) Cali Condors	2:02.31
Budapest 9	(Russia) Evgeny Rylov	(France) Energy Standard	1:48.62	(United States) Lisa Bratton	(Canada) Toronto Titans	2:01.77
Budapest 10	(United States) Ryan Murphy	(United States) LA Current	1:48.60	(United States) Beata Nelson	(United States) Cali Condors	2:02.51
Budapest SF 1	(Japan) Ryosuke Irie	(Japan) Tokyo Frog Kings	1:49.02	(Australia) Emily Seebohm	(France) Energy Standard	2:01.04
Budapest SF 2	(United States) Ryan Murphy	(United States) LA Current	1:47.48	(United States) Beata Nelson	(United States) Cali Condors	2:01.65
Budapest F	(Russia) Evgeny Rylov	(France) Energy Standard	1:46.37	(United States) Beata Nelson	(United States) Cali Condors	2:00.27

=== 50 m breaststroke ===
Meet	Men			Women		
Meet	Winner	Team	Time	Winner	Team	Time
Budapest 1	(Belarus) Ilya Shymanovich	(France) Energy Standard	25.64	(United States) Lilly King	(United States) Cali Condors	28.86
Budapest 2	(Turkey) Hüseyin Emre Sakçı	(Hungary) Iron	25.74	(Jamaica) Alia Atkinson	(United Kingdom) London Roar	29.20
Budapest 3	(Italy) Nicolò Martinenghi	(Italy) Aqua Centurions	26.06	(Italy) Martina Carraro	(Italy) Aqua Centurions	29.66
Budapest 4	(Turkey) Hüseyin Emre Sakçı	(Hungary) Iron	25.50	(United States) Lilly King	(United States) Cali Condors	29.51
Budapest 5	(United Kingdom) Adam Peaty	(United Kingdom) London Roar	26.10	(Jamaica) Alia Atkinson	(United Kingdom) London Roar	29.66
Budapest 6	(Belarus) Ilya Shymanovich	(France) Energy Standard	25.75	(Italy) Benedetta Pilato	(France) Energy Standard	29.45
Budapest 7	(Turkey) Hüseyin Emre Sakçı	(Hungary) Iron	25.29	(Finland) Ida Hulkko	(Hungary) Iron	29.33
Budapest 8	(United Kingdom) Adam Peaty	(United Kingdom) London Roar	25.98	(United States) Lilly King	(United States) Cali Condors	29.20
Budapest 9	(Turkey) Hüseyin Emre Sakçı	(Hungary) Iron	25.43	(Italy) Benedetta Pilato	(France) Energy Standard	29.13
Budapest 10	(Italy) Nicolò Martinenghi	(Italy) Aqua Centurions	25.89	(United States) Molly Hannis	(United States) Cali Condors	29.20
Budapest SF 1	(United Kingdom) Adam Peaty	(United Kingdom) London Roar	25.98	(Italy) Benedetta Pilato	(France) Energy Standard	28.86
Budapest SF 2	(Turkey) Hüseyin Emre Sakçı	(Hungary) Iron	25.54	(United States) Molly Hannis	(United States) Cali Condors	29.24
Budapest F	(Belarus) Ilya Shymanovich	(France) Energy Standard	25.48	(United States) Lilly King	(United States) Cali Condors	28.77

=== 100 m breaststroke ===
Meet	Men			Women		
Meet	Winner	Team	Time	Winner	Team	Time
Budapest 1	(Belarus) Ilya Shymanovich	(France) Energy Standard	56.13	(United States) Lilly King	(United States) Cali Condors	1:03.16
Budapest 2	(United Kingdom) Adam Peaty	(United Kingdom) London Roar	56.38	(Jamaica) Alia Atkinson	(United Kingdom) London Roar	1:04.21
Budapest 3	(Iceland) Anton Sveinn McKee	(Canada) Toronto Titans	56.30	(Japan) Miho Teramura	(Japan) Tokyo Frog Kings	1:04.89
Budapest 4	(Turkey) Hüseyin Emre Sakçı	(Hungary) Iron	57.17	(United States) Lilly King	(United States) Cali Condors	1:03.61
Budapest 5	(Japan) Yasuhiro Koseki	(Japan) Tokyo Frog Kings	56.11	(Jamaica) Alia Atkinson	(United Kingdom) London Roar	1:03.75
Budapest 6	(Belarus) Ilya Shymanovich	(France) Energy Standard	55.86	(Italy) Benedetta Pilato	(France) Energy Standard	1:03.89
Budapest 7	(Belarus) Ilya Shymanovich	(France) Energy Standard	55.85	(Finland) Ida Hulkko	(Hungary) Iron	1:04.41
Budapest 8	(Japan) Yasuhiro Koseki	(Japan) Tokyo Frog Kings	56.27	(United States) Lilly King	(United States) Cali Condors	1:03.39
Budapest 9	(Turkey) Hüseyin Emre Sakçı	(Hungary) Iron	55.74	(Italy) Benedetta Pilato	(France) Energy Standard	1:04.00
Budapest 10	(Italy) Nicolò Martinenghi	(Italy) Aqua Centurions	56.46	(United States) Lilly King	(United States) Cali Condors	1:03.15
Budapest SF 1	(United Kingdom) Adam Peaty	(United Kingdom) London Roar	55.49	(Jamaica) Alia Atkinson	(United Kingdom) London Roar	1:02.66
Budapest SF 2	(Turkey) Hüseyin Emre Sakçı	(Hungary) Iron	56.51	(United States) Lilly King	(United States) Cali Condors	1:03.29
Budapest F	(United Kingdom) Adam Peaty	(United Kingdom) London Roar	55.41	(United States) Lilly King	(United States) Cali Condors	1:02.50

=== 200 m breaststroke ===
Meet	Men			Women		
Meet	Winner	Team	Time	Winner	Team	Time
Budapest 1	(Germany) Marco Koch	(United States) New York Breakers	2:02.12	(United States) Lilly King	(United States) Cali Condors	2:17.11
Budapest 2	(Russia) Kirill Prigoda	(United Kingdom) London Roar	2:04.60	(United States) Annie Lazor	(United Kingdom) London Roar	2:18.85
Budapest 3	(Iceland) Anton Sveinn McKee	(Canada) Toronto Titans	2:01.73	(Canada) Kelsey Wog	(Canada) Toronto Titans	2:17.51
Budapest 4	(Germany) Marco Koch	(United States) New York Breakers	2:00.81	(United States) Lilly King	(United States) Cali Condors	2:16.04
Budapest 5	(United States) Will Licon	(United States) LA Current	2:03.92	(Japan) Sakiko Shimizu	(Japan) Tokyo Frog Kings	2:18.88
Budapest 6	(Germany) Marco Koch	(United States) New York Breakers	2:00.58	(Canada) Kelsey Wog	(Canada) Toronto Titans	2:17.13
Budapest 7	(Iceland) Anton Sveinn McKee	(Canada) Toronto Titans	2:03.02	(Canada) Kelsey Wog	(Canada) Toronto Titans	2:17.13
Budapest 8	(Germany) Marco Koch	(United States) New York Breakers	2:01.40	(United States) Lilly King	(United States) Cali Condors	2:15.80
Budapest 9	(Iceland) Anton Sveinn McKee	(Canada) Toronto Titans	2:03.41	(Canada) Kelsey Wog	(Canada) Toronto Titans	2:18.47
Budapest 10	(United States) Will Licon	(United States) LA Current	2:04.12	(United States) Annie Lazor	(United Kingdom) London Roar	2:17.04
Budapest SF 1	(Russia) Kirill Prigoda	(United Kingdom) London Roar	2:01.20	(United States) Emily Escobedo	(United States) New York Breakers	2:16.71
Budapest SF 2	(United States) Will Licon	(United States) LA Current	2:02.47	(United States) Lilly King	(United States) Cali Condors	2:16.79
Budapest F	(Russia) Kirill Prigoda	(United Kingdom) London Roar	2:01.71	(United States) Lilly King	(United States) Cali Condors	2:15.56

=== 50 m butterfly ===
Meet	Men			Women		
Meet	Winner	Team	Time	Winner	Team	Time
Budapest 1	(United States) Caeleb Dressel	(United States) Cali Condors	22.46	(France) Béryl Gastaldello	(United States) LA Current	24.75
Budapest 2	(Hungary) Szebasztián Szabó	(Italy) Aqua Centurions	22.00	(Netherlands) Ranomi Kromowidjojo	(Hungary) Iron	24.74
Budapest 3	(Hungary) Szebasztián Szabó	(Italy) Aqua Centurions	21.96	(France) Béryl Gastaldello	(United States) LA Current	24.79
Budapest 4	(Brazil) Nicholas Santos	(Hungary) Iron	22.30	(Netherlands) Ranomi Kromowidjojo	(Hungary) Iron	24.80
Budapest 5	(Japan) Takeshi Kawamoto	(Japan) Tokyo Frog Kings	22.38	(France) Béryl Gastaldello	(United States) LA Current	24.95
Budapest 6	(Hungary) Szebasztián Szabó	(Italy) Aqua Centurions	21.86	(United States) Madeline Banic	(France) Energy Standard	24.97
Budapest 7	(Brazil) Nicholas Santos	(Hungary) Iron	22.04	(Netherlands) Ranomi Kromowidjojo	(Hungary) Iron	24.59
Budapest 8	(United States) Caeleb Dressel	(United States) Cali Condors	22.41	(Russia) Arina Surkova	(United States) New York Breakers	25.46
Budapest 9	(Brazil) Nicholas Santos	(Hungary) Iron	21.78	(France) Mélanie Henique	(Hungary) Iron	24.62
Budapest 10	(Hungary) Szebasztián Szabó	(Italy) Aqua Centurions	21.86	(France) Béryl Gastaldello	(United States) LA Current	25.30
Budapest SF 1	(Japan) Takeshi Kawamoto	(Japan) Tokyo Frog Kings	22.50	(Russia) Arina Surkova	(United States) New York Breakers	24.87
Budapest SF 2	(Brazil) Nicholas Santos	(Hungary) Iron	21.80	(France) Mélanie Henique	(Hungary) Iron	24.65
Budapest F	(United States) Caeleb Dressel	(United States) Cali Condors	22.09	(Sweden) Sarah Sjöström	(France) Energy Standard	24.73

=== 100 m butterfly ===
Meet	Men			Women		
Meet	Winner	Team	Time	Winner	Team	Time
Budapest 1	(United States) Tom Shields	(United States) LA Current	49.58	(Sweden) Sarah Sjöström	(France) Energy Standard	56.00
Budapest 2	(Hungary) Szebasztián Szabó	(Italy) Aqua Centurions	49.93	(France) Marie Wattel	(United Kingdom) London Roar	56.45
Budapest 3	(United States) Tom Shields	(United States) LA Current	49.30	(Sweden) Louise Hansson	(Canada) Toronto Titans	56.45
Budapest 4	(United States) Caeleb Dressel	(United States) Cali Condors	49.35	(Russia) Arina Surkova	(United States) New York Breakers	56.49
Budapest 5	(United States) Tom Shields	(United States) LA Current	48.94	(France) Béryl Gastaldello	(United States) LA Current	55.84
Budapest 6	(South Africa) Chad le Clos	(France) Energy Standard	49.39	(Belarus) Anastasiya Shkurdai	(France) Energy Standard	55.64
Budapest 7	(South Africa) Chad le Clos	(France) Energy Standard	49.48	(Belarus) Anastasiya Shkurdai	(France) Energy Standard	56.03
Budapest 8	(United States) Caeleb Dressel	(United States) Cali Condors	49.33	(United States) Kelsi Dahlia	(United States) Cali Condors	56.15
Budapest 9	(South Africa) Chad le Clos	(France) Energy Standard	49.33	(Sweden) Sarah Sjöström	(France) Energy Standard	55.35
Budapest 10	(United States) Caeleb Dressel	(United States) Cali Condors	49.02	(France) Béryl Gastaldello	(United States) LA Current	55.71
Budapest SF 1	(South Africa) Chad le Clos	(France) Energy Standard	49.14	(Sweden) Sarah Sjöström	(France) Energy Standard	55.44
Budapest SF 2	(United States) Caeleb Dressel	(United States) Cali Condors	48.92	(France) Béryl Gastaldello	(United States) LA Current	55.32
Budapest F	(United States) Caeleb Dressel	(United States) Cali Condors	47.78	(France) Béryl Gastaldello	(United States) LA Current	55.34

=== 200 m butterfly ===
Meet	Men			Women		
Meet	Winner	Team	Time	Winner	Team	Time
Budapest 1	(United States) Tom Shields	(United States) LA Current	1:50.43	(United States) Hali Flickinger	(United States) Cali Condors	2:05.15
Budapest 2	(Brazil) Vinicius Lanza	(United Kingdom) London Roar	1:51.75	(Hungary) Katinka Hosszú	(Hungary) Iron	2:07.04
Budapest 3	(United States) Tom Shields	(United States) LA Current	1:50.55	(Japan) Suzuka Hasegawa	(Japan) Tokyo Frog Kings	2:03.12
Budapest 4	(Chinese Taipei) Eddie Wang	(United States) Cali Condors	1:51.32	(United States) Hali Flickinger	(United States) Cali Condors	2:04.34
Budapest 5	(United States) Tom Shields	(United States) LA Current	1:50.28	(Japan) Suzuka Hasegawa	(Japan) Tokyo Frog Kings	2:03.38
Budapest 6	(South Africa) Chad le Clos	(France) Energy Standard	1:50.57	(Hungary) Boglárka Kapás	(United States) New York Breakers	2:06.15
Budapest 7	(South Africa) Chad le Clos	(France) Energy Standard	1:50.28	(Hungary) Katinka Hosszú	(Hungary) Iron	2:05.45
Budapest 8	(Chinese Taipei) Eddie Wang	(United States) Cali Condors	1:50.90	(Japan) Suzuka Hasegawa	(Japan) Tokyo Frog Kings	2:03.53
Budapest 9	(South Africa) Chad le Clos	(France) Energy Standard	1:50.24	(Japan) Suzuka Hasegawa	(Japan) Tokyo Frog Kings	2:04.50
Budapest 10	(United States) Tom Shields	(United States) LA Current	1:49.78	(United States) Hali Flickinger	(United States) Cali Condors	2:04.36
Budapest SF 1	(South Africa) Chad le Clos	(France) Energy Standard	1:50.64	(Japan) Suzuka Hasegawa	(Japan) Tokyo Frog Kings	2:03.95
Budapest SF 2	(United States) Tom Shields	(United States) LA Current	1:49.02	(United States) Hali Flickinger	(United States) Cali Condors	2:04.25
Budapest F	(South Africa) Chad le Clos	(France) Energy Standard	1:48.57	(United States) Hali Flickinger	(United States) Cali Condors	2:03.35

=== 100 m individual medley ===
Meet	Men			Women		
Meet	Winner	Team	Time	Winner	Team	Time
Budapest 1	(United States) Caeleb Dressel	(United States) Cali Condors	51.36	(Sweden) Sarah Sjöström	(France) Energy Standard	57.74
Budapest 2	(Italy) Marco Orsi	(Hungary) Team Iron	51.69	(Russia) Maria Kameneva	(United Kingdom) London Roar	58.86
Budapest 3	(Russia) Vladimir Morozov	(Japan) Tokyo Frog Kings	51.46	(Japan) Runa Imai	(Japan) Tokyo Frog Kings	57.94
Budapest 4	(United States) Caeleb Dressel	(United States) Cali Condors	51.27	(United States) Melanie Margalis	(United States) Cali Condors	57.94
Budapest 5	(Norway) Tomoe Hvas	(United States) LA Current	51.83	(Japan) Runa Imai	(Japan) Tokyo Frog Kings	58.02
Budapest 6	(France) Florent Manaudou	(France) Energy Standard	51.49	(Belarus) Anastasiya Shkurdai	(France) Energy Standard	58.34
Budapest 7	(Italy) Marco Orsi	(Hungary) Team Iron	52.02	(Belarus) Anastasiya Shkurdai	(France) Energy Standard	58.39
Budapest 8	(United States) Caeleb Dressel	(United States) Cali Condors	51.11	(United States) Beata Nelson	(United States) Cali Condors	58.37
Budapest 9	(Italy) Marco Orsi	(Hungary) Team Iron	51.74	(Japan) Runa Imai	(Japan) Tokyo Frog Kings	58.04
Budapest 10	(United States) Caeleb Dressel	(United States) Cali Condors	50.48	(France) Béryl Gastaldello	(United States) LA Current	57.43
Budapest SF 1	(United States) Michael Andrew	(United States) New York Breakers	51.66	(Japan) Runa Imai	(Japan) Tokyo Frog Kings	57.77
Budapest SF 2	(United States) Caeleb Dressel	(United States) Cali Condors	49.88	(France) Béryl Gastaldello	(United States) LA Current	57.86
Budapest F	(United States) Caeleb Dressel	(United States) Cali Condors	49.28	(France) Béryl Gastaldello	(United States) LA Current	57.30

=== 200 m individual medley ===
Meet	Men			Women		
Meet	Winner	Team	Time	Winner	Team	Time
Budapest 1	(United States) Andrew Seliskar	(United States) LA Current	1:52.97	(United States) Melanie Margalis	(United States) Cali Condors	2:04.06
Budapest 2	(Germany) Philip Heintz	(Italy) Aqua Centurions	1:52.78	(Canada) Sydney Pickrem	(United Kingdom) London Roar	2:07.31
Budapest 3	(Japan) Kosuke Hagino	(Japan) Tokyo Frog Kings	1:53.01	(Japan) Yui Ohashi	(Japan) Tokyo Frog Kings	2:05.13
Budapest 4	(Brazil) Leonardo Santos	(Hungary) Iron	1:52.84	(United States) Melanie Margalis	(United States) Cali Condors	2:04.32
Budapest 5	(Greece) Andreas Vazaios	(United Kingdom) London Roar	1:52.65	(Japan) Yui Ohashi	(Japan) Tokyo Frog Kings	2:05.26
Budapest 6	(Germany) Philip Heintz	(Italy) Aqua Centurions	1:52.83	(United Kingdom) Abbie Wood	(United States) New York Breakers	2:04.77
Budapest 7	(Brazil) Leonardo Santos	(Hungary) Iron	1:53.19	(Canada) Kelsey Wog	(Canada) Toronto Titans	2:06.69
Budapest 8	(Greece) Andreas Vazaios	(United Kingdom) London Roar	1:52.41	(United States) Melanie Margalis	(United States) Cali Condors	2:04.18
Budapest 9	(Japan) Kosuke Hagino	(Japan) Tokyo Frog Kings	1:52.84	(Japan) Yui Ohashi	(Japan) Tokyo Frog Kings	2:05.10
Budapest 10	(Brazil) Vinicius Lanza	(United Kingdom) London Roar	1:53.70	(United States) Beata Nelson	(United States) Cali Condors	2:05.95
Budapest SF 1	(United Kingdom) Duncan Scott	(United Kingdom) London Roar	1:51.66	(Japan) Yui Ohashi	(Japan) Tokyo Frog Kings	2:03.93
Budapest SF 2	(Brazil) Leonardo Santos	(Hungary) Iron	1:52.06	(Israel) Anastasia Gorbenko	(United States) LA Current	2:06.68
Budapest F	(United States) Andrew Seliskar	(United States) LA Current	1:51.53	(Canada) Sydney Pickrem	(United Kingdom) London Roar	2:04.00

=== 400 m individual medley ===
Meet	Men			Women		
Meet	Winner	Team	Time	Winner	Team	Time
Budapest 1	(United Kingdom) Max Litchfield	(France) Energy Standard	4:04.50	(United States) Melanie Margalis	(United States) Cali Condors	4:25.48
Budapest 2	(Hungary) Dávid Verrasztó	(Hungary) Iron	4:04.25	(Hungary) Katinka Hosszú	(Hungary) Iron	4:30.52
Budapest 3	(Japan) Kosuke Hagino	(Japan) Tokyo Frog Kings	4:02.58	(Japan) Yui Ohashi	(Japan) Tokyo Frog Kings	4:26.13
Budapest 4	(Hungary) Dávid Verrasztó	(Hungary) Iron	4:03.52	(United Kingdom) Abbie Wood	(United States) New York Breakers	4:28.20
Budapest 5	(Japan) Kosuke Hagino	(Japan) Tokyo Frog Kings	4:01.52	(Japan) Yui Ohashi	(Japan) Tokyo Frog Kings	4:26.48
Budapest 6	(Russia) Maxim Stupin	(France) Energy Standard	4:04.76	(Canada) Tessa Cieplucha	(Canada) Toronto Titans	4:27.86
Budapest 7	(Hungary) Dávid Verrasztó	(Hungary) Iron	4:04.70	(Canada) Tessa Cieplucha	(Canada) Toronto Titans	4:27.76
Budapest 8	(Japan) Kosuke Hagino	(Japan) Tokyo Frog Kings	4:01.41	(Japan) Yui Ohashi	(Japan) Tokyo Frog Kings	4:25.53
Budapest 9	(Japan) Kosuke Hagino	(Japan) Tokyo Frog Kings	4:01.77	(Japan) Yui Ohashi	(Japan) Tokyo Frog Kings	4:25.84
Budapest 10	(United Kingdom) Duncan Scott	(United Kingdom) London Roar	4:07.88	(Canada) Sydney Pickrem	(United Kingdom) London Roar	4:25.90
Budapest SF 1	(Japan) Kosuke Hagino	(Japan) Tokyo Frog Kings	4:02.40	(Japan) Yui Ohashi	(Japan) Tokyo Frog Kings	4:23.25
Budapest SF 2	(Brazil) Leonardo Santos	(Hungary) Iron	4:04.16	(United States) Hali Flickinger	(United States) Cali Condors	4:27.07
Budapest F	(United Kingdom) Duncan Scott	(United Kingdom) London Roar	3:59.83	(Canada) Sydney Pickrem	(United Kingdom) London Roar	4:24.84

=== 50 m skins ===
Meet	Men				Women			
Meet	Winner	Team	Stroke	Time	Winner	Team	Stroke	Time
Budapest 1	(United States) Ryan Murphy	(United States) LA Current	Backstroke	23.88	(United States) Lilly King	(United States) Cali Condors	Breaststroke	28.90
Budapest 2	(Germany) Christian Diener	(United Kingdom) London Roar	Backstroke	25.19	(Russia) Maria Kameneva	(United Kingdom) London Roar	Backstroke	27.67
Budapest 3	(United States) Ryan Murphy	(United States) LA Current	Backstroke	24.71	(France) Béryl Gastaldello	(United States) LA Current	Freestyle	24.69
Budapest 4	(Turkey) Hüseyin Emre Sakçı	(Hungary) Iron	Breaststroke	25.73	(United States) Olivia Smoliga	(United States) Cali Condors	Backstroke	26.77
Budapest 5	(United States) Tom Shields	(United States) LA Current	Butterfly	23.24	(Jamaica) Alia Atkinson	(United Kingdom) London Roar	Breaststroke	30.28
Budapest 6	(France) Florent Manaudou	(France) Energy Standard	Freestyle	22.27	(Canada) Kylie Masse	(Canada) Toronto Titans	Backstroke	27.17
Budapest 7	(Turkey) Hüseyin Emre Sakçı	(Hungary) Iron	Breaststroke	25.57	(Sweden) Sarah Sjöström	(France) Energy Standard	Freestyle	23.72
Budapest 8	(United Kingdom) Adam Peaty	(United Kingdom) London Roar	Breaststroke	26.65	(United States) Lilly King	(United States) Cali Condors	Breaststroke	29.04
Budapest 9	(South Africa) Chad le Clos	(France) Energy Standard	Butterfly	23.43	(Sweden) Sarah Sjöström	(France) Energy Standard	Freestyle	24.18
Budapest 10	(United States) Ryan Murphy	(United States) LA Current	Backstroke	24.18	(United States) Lilly King	(United States) Cali Condors	Breaststroke	29.24
Budapest SF 1	(United Kingdom) Adam Peaty	(United Kingdom) London Roar	Breaststroke	25.70	(Sweden) Sarah Sjöström	(France) Energy Standard	Butterfly	25.91
Budapest SF 2	(United States) Ryan Murphy	(United States) LA Current	Backstroke	24.23	(United States) Lilly King	(United States) Cali Condors	Breaststroke	29.15
Budapest F	(United Kingdom) Adam Peaty	(United Kingdom) London Roar	Breaststroke	26.10	(United States) Lilly King	(United States) Cali Condors	Breaststroke	29.14

=== 4 × 100 m freestyle relay ===
Meet	Men		Women	
Meet	Team	Time	Team	Time
Budapest 1	(United States) LA Current	3:06.18	(France) Energy Standard	3:16.22
Budapest 2	(Italy) Aqua Centurions	3:05.94	(United Kingdom) London Roar	3:30.91
Budapest 3	(Italy) Aqua Centurions	3:04.93	(United States) LA Current	3:30.10
Budapest 4	(United States) Cali Condors	3:06.11	(United States) Cali Condors	3:30.09
Budapest 5	(United States) LA Current	3:06.24	(United Kingdom) London Roar	3:27.48
Budapest 6	(Italy) Aqua Centurions	3:04.94	(France) Energy Standard	3:29.08
Budapest 7	(Canada) Toronto Titans	3:06.23	(France) Energy Standard	3:29.50
Budapest 8	(United States) Cali Condors	3:06.07	(United Kingdom) London Roar	3:28.73
Budapest 9	(Canada) Toronto Titans	3:06.09	(France) Energy Standard	3:29.43
Budapest 10	(United States) Cali Condors	3:05.52	(United Kingdom) London Roar	3:28.65
Budapest SF 1	(France) Energy Standard	3:05.72	(France) Energy Standard	3:25.82
Budapest SF 2	(United States) LA Current	3:04.78	(United States) Cali Condors	3:28.52
Budapest F	(France) Energy Standard	3:02.78	(France) Energy Standard	3:25.37

=== 4 × 100 m medley relay ===
Meet	Men		Women	
Meet	Team	Time	Team	Time
Budapest 1	(United States) LA Current	3:23.27	(United States) Cali Condors	3:47.92
Budapest 2	(United Kingdom) London Roar	3:23.18	(United Kingdom) London Roar	3:50.27
Budapest 3	(United States) LA Current	3:21.85	(United States) LA Current	3:50.05
Budapest 4	(Hungary) Iron	3:24.81	(United States) Cali Condors	3:48.92
Budapest 5	(United States) LA Current	3:20.95	(United Kingdom) London Roar	3:48.85
Budapest 6	(France) Energy Standard	3:20.68	(Canada) Toronto Titans	3:48.50
Budapest 7	(France) Energy Standard	3:21.95	(France) Energy Standard	3:46.95
Budapest 8	(United Kingdom) London Roar	3:22.97	(United States) Cali Condors	3:47.79
Budapest 9	(France) Energy Standard	3:22.08	(France) Energy Standard	3:47.83
Budapest 10	(United States) LA Current	3:21.26	(United States) Cali Condors	3:47.13
Budapest SF 1	(United Kingdom) London Roar	3:19.50	(France) Energy Standard	3:45.58
Budapest SF 2	(United States) LA Current	3:20.61	(United States) Cali Condors	3:48.09
Budapest F	(France) Energy Standard	3:18.28	(United States) Cali Condors	3:44.52

=== 4 × 100 m mixed freestyle relay ===
Meet
Meet	Team	Time
Budapest 1	(France) Energy Standard	3:16.22
Budapest 2	(United States) DC Trident	3:18.82
Budapest 3	(United States) LA Current	3:17.64
Budapest 4	(United States) DC Trident	3:17.60
Budapest 5	(United States) LA Current	3:17.19
Budapest 6	(France) Energy Standard	3:16.99
Budapest 7	(France) Energy Standard	3:15.91
Budapest 8	(United Kingdom) London Roar	3:16.84
Budapest 9	(France) Energy Standard	3:16.81
Budapest 10	(United States) Cali Condors	3:16.14
Budapest SF 1	(United Kingdom) London Roar	3:15.17
Budapest SF 2	(United States) Cali Condors	3:14.96
Budapest F	(France) Energy Standard	3:14.21

== Statistics ==
Rank	Player	Team	Points	Races won
1	(United States) Caeleb Dressel	(United States) Cali Condors	463.5	24
2	(United States) Lilly King	(United States) Cali Condors	350	20
3	(France) Béryl Gastaldello	(United States) LA Current	340.5	17
4	(United States) Ryan Murphy	(United States) LA Current	329	15
5	(Sweden) Sarah Sjöström	(France) Energy Standard	297	15
6	(United States) Olivia Smoliga	(United States) Cali Condors	277.5	11
7	(Hong Kong) Siobhán Haughey	(France) Energy Standard	250	10
8	(United States) Tom Shields	(United States) LA Current	246	9
9	(South Africa) Chad le Clos	(France) Energy Standard	245	10
10	(Turkey) Hüseyin Emre Sakçı	(Hungary) Team Iron	231.5	10

=== World Records ===
At the 2020 International Swimming League, nine world records were set (two of this record were beaten by the same person in the same event).

==== Individual ====
Sex	Event	Athlete	Country	Team	Time
Male	50 metres freestyle	Caeleb Dressel	United States	Cali Condors	20.16
Male	100 metres individual medley	Caeleb Dressel	United States	Cali Condors	49.28
Male	100 metres butterfly	Caeleb Dressel	United States	Cali Condors	47.78
Male	100 metres breaststroke	Adam Peaty	Great Britain	London Roar	55.41
Male	100 metres backstroke	Kliment Kolesnikov	Russia	Energy Standard	48.58
Female	50 metres backstroke	Kira Toussaint	Netherlands	London Roar	25.60

==== Relays ====
Sex	Event	Athlete	Nation	Team	Time
Female	4 × 100 metres medley relay	Olivia Smoliga; Lilly King; Kelsi Dahlia; Erika Brown	United States	Cali Condors	3:44.52
