= DC Trident =

Professional swimming team based in Washington, D.C.

- First season: 2019
- Association: International Swimming League
- Based in: Washington, D.C. (United States)
- Head coach: Cyndi Gallagher
- General manager: Kaitlin Sandeno
- Captain: Madison Kennedy & Giles Smith

DC Trident is a professional swimming team based in Washington, D.C. DC Trident competes in the International Swimming League (ISL), which is a global, professional swimming league consisting of ten teams: the DC Trident, the New York Breakers, the L.A. Current, the Cali Condors, the Aqua Centurions, Energy Standard, the London Roar, Team IRON, the Toronto Titans, and the Tokyo Frog Kings.

== Team history and formation ==
The team was founded in 2019 as part of the ISL's inaugural season. League founder and President Konstantin Grigorishin selected multi-Olympic medalist Kaitlin Sandeno as the club's general manager.

== 2019 ISL season ==
DC Trident competed in three meets around the world throughout the three-month-long season. The team finished in an overall standing of sixth, scoring 975 total points, and winning a total of 14 races. The men and women contributed nearly the same number of points to the team total, with the women earning 476 points and the men earning 463. The league was split into two brackets, consisting of four teams each – two American and two European clubs. DC Trident competed in a bracket with the Cali Condors, Energy Standard, and the Aqua Centurions.

DC Trident's first meet took place October 5–6 in Indianapolis, Indiana in the United States, where the team took third place. Its next competition took place the next week, October 12–13 in Naples, Italy, where DC Trident once again took third place, this time by a mere half of a point.

The team's third and final meet took place November 16–17, just outside the team's home of Washington, D.C. in College Park, M.D. Labeled by the league as "The American Derby", the meet featured all four ISL teams based in the United States. Following the pattern of the first two meets, DC Trident edged out the New York Breakers to earn third place.

=== 2019 roster ===
(United States) DC Trident
Men	Women
(United States) Zach Apple	(Czech Republic) Anika Apostalon
(United States) Kevin Cordes	(United States) Emma Barksdale
(United States) Abrahm Devine	(United States) Lisa Bratton
(United States) Ian Finnerty	(United States) Natalie Coughlin (C)
(United States) Zane Grothe	(United States) Bethany Galat
(United States) Zach Harting	(United States) Sarah Gibson
(Australia) Tristan Hollard	(Hong Kong) Siobhán Haughey
(United States) Robert Howard	(United States) Madison Kennedy
(United States) Jay Litherland	(Czech Republic) Simona Kubová
(United States) Cody Miller (vice-captain)	(Australia) Leah Neale
(United States) Giles Smith	(Australia) Leiston Pickett
(Serbia) Velimir Stjepanović	(Singapore) Quah Ting Wen
(France) Jérémy Stravius	(Philippines) Remedy Rule
(Greece) Andreas Vazaios	(United States) Claire Rasmus

=== Match results ===
Dates	Location	Venue	Teams	Results	MVP
Regular season
5–6 October	(United States) Indianapolis	Indiana University Natatorium	(France) Energy Standard 539 (United States) Cali Condors 457 (United States) DC Trident 330.5 (Italy) Aqua Centurions 300.5		(Sweden) Sarah Sjöström ( (France) Energy Standard) 55.5 pts
12–13 October	(Italy) Naples	Piscina Felice Scandone	(France) Energy Standard 493 (United States) Cali Condors 490.5 (United States) DC Trident 322 (Italy) Aqua Centurions 321.5		(United States) Caeleb Dressel ( (United States) Cali Condors) 57.5 pts
15–16 November	(United States) College Park	Geary F. Eppley Recreation Center	(United States) LA Current 495 (United States) Cali Condors 489.5 (United States) DC Trident 322.5 (United States) NY Breakers 315		(United States) Caeleb Dressel ( (United States) Cali Condors) 61.5 pts

=== The Legend of the Trident ===
In commemoration of their first season, DC trident announced The Legend of the Trident comic and souvenir program. Created in conjunction with multi award-winning editor Rantz Hoseley, the comic book consists of photos and information on the team and its members, along with an exclusive comic book story written by New York Times bestselling writer Tony Lee.

== 2020 ISL season ==
DC Trident competed in the second season of the ISL with an updated 2020 roster.

DC Trident competed in meets two, four, five, and seven in Budapest. During their first meet, they placed third with a total of 350 points. In their second meet, they placed fourth with 287 points. In their third meet, they placed fourth with 287 points. In their fourth and final meet of the season, they placed fourth with 256 points. Their total of 1181 points placed them ninth among the ten teams.

=== 2020 roster ===
(United States) DC Trident
Men	Women
(United States) Zach Apple	(Canada) Bailey Andison
(Israel) Meiron Cheruti	(United States) Emma Barksdale
(United States) Tommy Cope	(United States) Amy Bilquist
(United States) Abrahm DeVine	(Germany) Kathrin Delmer
(United States) Ian Finnerty	(United States) Bethany Galat
(United States) Zane Grothe	(New Zealand) Ali Galyer
(United States) Zach Harting	(United States) Margo Geer
(Egypt) Mohamed Hassan	(United States) Leah Gingrich
(United States) Robert Howard	(United States) Madison Kennedy (C)
(United States) Andrew Loy	(United States) Lindsey Kozelsky
(Brazil) Santana Matheus	(United States) Linnea Mack
(United States) Conner McHugh	(Russia) Rozaliya Nasretdinova
(Russia) Mark Nikolaev	(United States) Kylee Perry
(United States) Jacob Pebley	(Singapore) Ting Wen Quah
(United States) Giles Smith (vice-captain)	(Philippines) Remedy Rule
(Serbia) Velimir Stjepanović	(United States) Miranda Tucker

=== Match results ===
Dates	Location	Venue	Teams	Results	MVP
Regular season
18–19 October (Match 2)	(Hungary) Budapest	Danube Arena	(United Kingdom) London Roar 609.5 (Hungary) Team Iron 392.5 (United States) DC Trident 350 (Italy) Aqua Centurions 344		(Netherlands) Ranomi Kromowidjojo ( (Hungary) Team Iron) 56 pts
26–27 October (Match 4)	(Hungary) Budapest	Danube Arena	(United States) Cali Condors 610.5 (Hungary) Team Iron 418.5 (United States) New York Breakers 394 (United States) DC Trident 287		(United States) Caeleb Dressel ( (United States) Cali Condors) 75 pts
30–31 October (Match 5)	(Hungary) Budapest	Danube Arena	(United Kingdom) London Roar 499 (United States) LA Current 478.5 (Japan) Tokyo Frog Kings 446.5 (United States) DC Trident 287.0		(United States) Tom Shields ( (United States) LA Current) 62.5 pts
5–6 November (Match 7)	(Hungary) Budapest	Danube Arena	(France) Energy Standard 613 (Hungary) Team Iron 448 (Canada) Toronto Titans 391 (United States) DC Trident 256		(Turkey) Emre Sakçı ( (Hungary) Team Iron) 51 pts

== 2021 ISL season ==
DC Trident competed in the third season of the ISL.
