= Cali Condors =

San Francisco professional swimming club (2019–2021)

- First season: 2019
- Association: International Swimming League
- Based in: San Francisco (United States)
- Head coach: Gregg Troy
- General manager: Jason Lezak
- Captain: Caeleb Dressel & Olivia Smoliga
- Website: https://calicondors.club

The Cali Condors were a professional swimming club and one of the original eight clubs of the International Swimming League. The team was based in San Francisco led by general manager Jason Lezak and head coach Gregg Troy. Assistant coaches for the 2019 season were Dean Boxall, Jeff Julian, and Linda Kiefer.

During the inaugural season in 2019 they earned their spot in the final as one of the top two teams in their division. They finished the season as the top American team in the league ahead of their rival LA Current.

The Condors won their first International Swimming League Championship during the 2020 Season in Budapest, Hungary. They were led by Head Coach Jonty Skinner, and assistant coaches Allison Beebe, Sean Schimmel, and Brian Schrader.

== Head coaches ==
Gregg Troy (2019, 2021) Jonty Skinner (2020)

== 2019 International Swimming League season ==
=== Team roster ===
ISL teams had a maximum roster of 32 athletes for 2019 season, with a suggested size of each club's traveling roster of 28 (14 men and 14 women). Each club had a captain and a vice-captain of different gender. The Condors had a majority of Americans on their team with athletes from five other countries around the world.

(United States) Cali Condors
Men	Women
(United States) Bowe Becker	(Denmark) Signe Bro
(United States) Caeleb Dressel (C)	(United States) Mallory Comerford
(United States) Nic Fink	(United States) Kelsi Dahlia
(United States) Townley Haas	(United States) Hali Flickinger
(Denmark) Anton Ipsen	(United States) Molly Hannis
(United States) Tate Jackson	(United States) Natalie Hinds
(Poland) Radosław Kawęcki	(United States) Lilly King
(Australia) Mitch Larkin	(United States) Melanie Margalis
(Poland) Kacper Majchrzak	(Canada) Kylie Masse
(United States) Justin Ress	(United States) Olivia Smoliga (vice-captain)
(United States) John Shebat	(Australia) Ariarne Titmus
(Poland) Jan Świtkowski	(Poland) Katarzyna Wasick
(United Kingdom) Mark Szaranek	(United States) Amanda Weir
(United States) Andrew Wilson	(Canada) Kelsey Wog

=== Match results ===
In the 2019 (inaugural) ISL season, the Condors finished in 3rd place in the final.

Dates	Location	Venue	Teams	Results	MVP
Regular season
5–6 October	(United States) Indianapolis	Indiana University Natatorium	(France) Energy Standard 539 (United States) Cali Condors 457 (United States) DC Trident 330.5 (Italy) Aqua Centurions 300.5		(Sweden) Sarah Sjöström ( (France) Energy Standard)
12–13 October	(Italy) Naples	Piscina Felice Scandone	(France) Energy Standard 493 (United States) Cali Condors 490.5 (United States) DC Trident 322 (Italy) Aqua Centurions 321.5		(United States) Caeleb Dressel ( (United States) Cali Condors)
15–16 November	(United States) College Park	Geary F. Eppley Recreation Center	(United States) LA Current 495 (United States) Cali Condors 489.5 (United States) DC Trident 322.5 (United States) New York Breakers 315		(United States) Caeleb Dressel ( (United States) Cali Condors)
Final Match
20–21 December	(United States) Las Vegas	Mandalay Bay Resort and Casino	(France) Energy Standard 453.5 (United Kingdom) London Roar 444 (United States) Cali Condors 415.5 (United States) LA Current 318		(United States) Caeleb Dressel ( (United States) Cali Condors)

== 2020 International Swimming League season ==
=== Team roster ===
(United States) Cali Condors
Men	Women
(Jordan) Khader Baqlah	(United States) Haley Anderson
(United States) Bowe Becker	(United States) Erika Brown
(United States) Gunnar Bentz	(United States) Veronica Burchill
(Poland) Marcin Cieślak	(United States) Kelsi Dahlia
(United States) Kevin Cordes	(United States) Sherridon Dressel
(United States) Caeleb Dressel (C)	(United States) Kelly Fertel
(United States) Nic Fink	(United States) Hali Flickinger
(United States) Townley Haas	(United States) Molly Hannis
(United States) Tate Jackson	(Australia) Meg Harris
(Poland) Radosław Kawęcki	(United States) Natalie Hinds
(Australia) Mitch Larkin	(United States) Lilly King
(Australia) Clyde Lewis	(United States) Melanie Margalis
(Poland) Kacper Majchrzak	(United States) Lia Neal
(Ecuador) Tomas Peribonio	(United States) Beata Nelson
(United States) Justin Ress	(United States) Allison Schmitt
(United States) Coleman Stewart	(United States) Meghan Small
(United Kingdom) Mark Szaranek	(United States) Olivia Smoliga (vice-captain)
(Chinese Taipei) Eddie Wang	(Australia) Ariarne Titmus

=== Match results ===
Dates	Location	Venue	Teams	Results	MVP
Regular season
16–17 October (Match 1)	(Hungary) Budapest	Danube Arena	(United States) Cali Condors 567 (France) Energy Standard 463 (United States) LA Current 420 (United States) New York Breakers 266		(United States) Lilly King ( (United States) Cali Condors) 87.5 pts
26–27 October (Match 4)	(Hungary) Budapest	Danube Arena	(United States) Cali Condors 610.5 (Hungary) Team Iron 418.5 (United States) New York Breakers 394 (United States) DC Trident 287		(United States) Caeleb Dressel ( (United States) Cali Condors) 75 pts
5–6 November (Match 8)	(Hungary) Budapest	Danube Arena	(United States) Cali Condors 507 (United Kingdom) London Roar 491.5 (Japan) Tokyo Frog Kings 419 (United States) New York Breakers 296.5		(United States) Caeleb Dressel ( (United States) Cali Condors) 69 pts
9–10 November (Match 10)	(Hungary) Budapest	Danube Arena	(United States) Cali Condors 558 (United States) LA Current 495 (United Kingdom) London Roar 398 (Italy) Aqua Centurions 255		(United States) Caeleb Dressel ( (United States) Cali Condors) 80.5 pts
Semifinal
15-16 November (Semifinal 2)	(Hungary) Budapest	Danube Arena	(United States) Cali Condors 605.5 (United States) LA Current 462 (Hungary) Team Iron 340.5 (Canada) Toronto Titans 303		(United States) Caeleb Dressel ( (United States) Cali Condors) 90.5 pts
Final Match
21-22 November (Final)	(Hungary) Budapest	Danube Arena	(United States) Cali Condors 561.5 (France) Energy Standard 464.5 (United Kingdom) London Roar 391 (United States) LA Current 298		(United States) Caeleb Dressel ( (United States) Cali Condors) 96 pts

== 2021 International Swimming League season ==
=== Team roster ===
(United States) Cali Condors
Men	Women
(Jordan) Khader Baqlah	(United States) Erika Brown
(Poland) Marcin Cieślak	(United States) Kelsi Dahlia
(United States) Kevin Cordes	(Netherlands) Maaike de Waard
(United States) Caeleb Dressel (C)	(Germany) Kathrin Demler
(United States) Nic Fink	(United States) Sherridon Dressel
(United States) Townley Haas	(United States) Emily Escobedo
(Russia) Oleg Kostin	(United States) Hali Flickinger
(Russia) Aleksandr Krasnykh	(United States) Molly Hannis
(Poland) Kacper Majchrzak	(United States) Natalie Hinds
(Mexico) José Ángel Martínez	(United States) Lilly King
(Netherlands) Jesse Puts	(Germany) Leonie Kullmann
(United States) Justin Ress	(United States) Beata Nelson
(United States) Coleman Stewart	(United States) Olivia Smoliga (vice-captain)
(United Kingdom) Mark Szaranek	(Canada) Katerine Savard
(Chinese Taipei) Eddie Wang	
(United Kingdom) Brodie Williams	

=== Match results ===
Dates	Location	Venue	Teams	Results	MVP
Regular season
28-29 August (Match 2)	(Italy) Naples	Piscina Felice Scandone	(United States) Cali Condors 707 (United States) LA Current 402.5 (Japan) Tokyo Frog Kings 371.5 (United States) New York Breakers 265		(United States) Coleman Stewart (United States) (Cali Condors) 95 Pts
4-5 September (Match 4)	(Italy) Naples	Piscina Felice Scandone	(United States) Cali Condors 594 (United States) LA Current 444.5 (United States) Aqua Centurions 375.5 (Italy) DC Trident 359		(United States) Caeleb Dressel (United States) (Cali Condors) 112.5 Pts
11-12 September (Match 6)	(Italy) Naples	Piscina Felice Scandone	(United Kingdom) London Roar 529.5 (United States) Cali Condors 478.5 (Italy) Aqua Centurions 379.5 (Japan) Tokyo Frog Kings 376.5		(Japan) Daiya Seto (Japan) (Tokyo Frog Kings) 57 Pts
16-17 September (Match 7)	(Italy) Naples	Piscina Felice Scandone	(United States) Cali Condors 581 (Canada) Toronto Titans 529.5 (Hungary) Team Iron 362.5 (United States) New York Breakers 293		(United States) Beata Nelson (United States) (Cali Condors) 67 Pts
