= New York Breakers =

US professional swimming club

New York Breakers (NY Breakers)
- Sport: Swimming
- First season: 2019
- League: International Swimming League
- Head coach: Martin Truijens
- General manager: Tim Teeter
- Captain: Jeanette Ottesen & Michael Andrew

NY Breakers is a professional swimming club and one of the original eight clubs of the global International Swimming League (ISL) based in New York City led by general manager, Tim Teeter and head coach, Martin Truijens. The ISL is owned by Konstantin Grigorishin and had its inaugural season in 2019. The original eight clubs were: DC Trident, the New York Breakers, the LA Current, and the Cali Condors in the United States of America, and the Aqua Centurions, Energy Standard, the London Roar, and IRON in Europe. In 2020 ISL added the Toronto Titans (Canada) and a Tokyo team (Japan) for a total of ten teams.

During the inaugural season in 2019, NY Breakers ended 4th in Lewisville, Budapest and College Park, MD in the preliminary rounds and failed to advance to the finale in Las Vegas.

== 2019 International Swimming League season ==
=== Team roster ===
ISL teams had a maximum roster of 32 athletes for 2019 season, with a suggested size of each club's traveling roster of 28 (14 men and 14 women). Each club had a captain and a vice-captain of different gender. The Breakers had one of the most culturally diverse teams of the league after Energy Standard, with athletes from 11 different countries representing the program.

(United States) New York Breakers
Men	Women
(United States) Michael Andrew	(Canada) Haley Black
(Brazil) Marcelo Chierighini	(Denmark) Pernille Blume
(Brazil) João de Lucca (C)	(United States) Ali DeLoof
(Canada) Mack Darragh	(United States) Catie DeLoof
(Colombia) Jonathan Gómez	(United States) Gabby DeLoof
(Germany) Marius Kusch	(United States) Emily Escobedo
(Germany) Marco Koch	(Germany) Reva Foos
(Australia) Clyde Lewis	(United States) Breeja Larson (C)
(Australia) Jack McLoughlin	(South Africa) Tayla Lovemore
(Ecuador) Tomas Peribonio	(United States) Lia Neal
(South Africa) Chris Reid	(Canada) Emily Overholt
(South Africa) Brad Tandy	(United Kingdom) Alys Thomas
(Russia) Grigory Tarasevich	(Australia) Madison Wilson
(Canada) Markus Thormeyer	(United Kingdom) Abbie Wood

=== Match results ===
In the 2019 (inaugural) ISL season, NY Breakers came 4th during the playoffs and failed to advance to the final.

Dates	Location	Venue	Teams	Results	MVP
Regular season
19–20 October	(United States) Lewisville, Texas	The LISD Westside Aquatic Center	(United Kingdom) London Roar 484.5 (United States) LA Current 457 (Hungary) Team Iron 402 (United States) New York Breakers 278.5		(Russia) Vladimir Morozov ( (Hungary) Team Iron) 43.5 pts
26–27 October	(Hungary) Budapest	Danube Arena	(United Kingdom) London Roar 505.5 (Hungary) Team Iron 425 (United States) LA Current 408 (United States) New York Breakers 292.5		(Hungary) Katinka Hosszú ( (Hungary) Team Iron) 47 pts
15–16 November	(United States) College Park	Geary F. Eppley Recreation Center	(United States) LA Current 495 (United States) Cali Condors 489 (United States) DC Trident 322.5 (United States) New York Breakers 315		(United States) Caeleb Dressel ( (United States) Cali Condors) 61.5 pts

== 2020 International Swimming League season ==
=== Team roster ===
(United States) New York Breakers
Men	Women
(Brazil) Brandon Almeida	(Denmark) Signe Bro
(United States) Michael Andrew (vice-captain)	(Russia) Svetlana Chimrova
(Austria) Felix Auböck	(United States) Emily Escobedo
(New Zealand) Lewis Clareburt	(United Kingdom) Chloe Golding
(Germany) Marco Koch	(Australia) Abbey Harkin
(United Kingdom) Joe Litchfield	(Hungary) Boglárka Kapás
(Australia) Cameron McEvoy	(Hungary) Ajna Késely
(Poland) Michal Poprawa	(Denmark) Jeanette Ottesen (C)
(South Africa) Chris Reid	(United Kingdom) Molly Renshaw
(United Kingdom) Matthew Richards	(Australia) Mikkayla Sheridan
(Poland) Jakub Skierka	(Russia) Arina Surkova
(Australia) Brendon Smith	(Poland) Alicja Tchórz
(Poland) Jan Świtkowski	(Russia) Daria S. Ustinova
(Hungary) Ádám Telegdy	(United Kingdom) Sarah Vasey
(Belgium) Pieter Timmers	(United States) Tevyn Waddell
(United Kingdom) Jacob Whittle	(Poland) Kasia Wasick
(Germany) Damian Wierling	(United Kingdom) Abbie Wood
(United Kingdom) James Wilby	

=== Match results ===
Dates	Location	Venue	Teams	Results	MVP
Regular season
16–17 October (Match 1)	(Hungary) Budapest	Danube Arena	(United States) Cali Condors 567 (France) Energy Standard 463 (United States) LA Current 420 (United States) New York Breakers 266		(United States) Lilly King ( (United States) Cali Condors) 87.5 pts
26–27 October (Match 4)	(Hungary) Budapest	Danube Arena	(United States) Cali Condors 610.5 (Hungary) Team Iron 418.5 (United States) New York Breakers 394 (United States) DC Trident 287		(United States) Caeleb Dressel ( (United States) Cali Condors) 75 pts
1–2 November (Match 6)	(Hungary) Budapest	Danube Arena	(France) Energy Standard 609 (Canada) Toronto Titans 448 (United States) New York Breakers 354.5 (Italy) Aqua Centurions 287		(Hong Kong) Siobhán Haughey ( (France) Energy Standard) 61.5 pts
5–6 November (Match 8)	(Hungary) Budapest	Danube Arena	(United States) Cali Condors 507 (United Kingdom) London Roar 491.5 (Japan) Tokyo Frog Kings 419 (United States) New York Breakers 296.5		(United States) Caeleb Dressel ( (United States) Cali Condors) 69 pts
