= LA Current =

Swimming club in USA

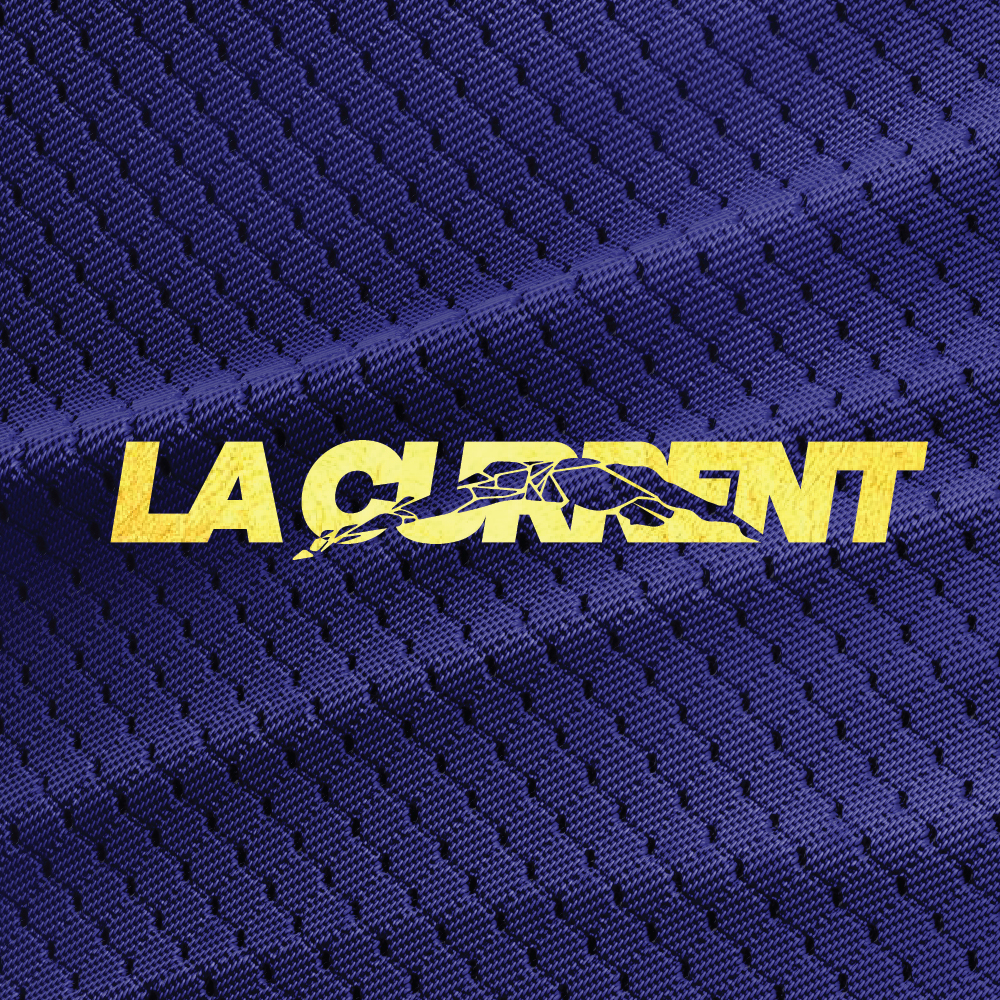
- LA Current
- First season: 2019
- Association: International Swimming League
- League: International Swimming League
- Based in: Los Angeles, CA (United States)
- Head coach: David Marsh
- General manager: Lenny Krayzelburg
- Captain: Ryan Murphy & Béryl Gastaldello
- Website: https://lacurrent.club

The LA Current is a professional swimming club and one of the original eight clubs of the International Swimming League. The team is based in Los Angeles led by general manager Lenny Krayzelburg and head coach David Marsh.

During the inaugural season in 2019 they earned their spot in the final as one of the top two teams in their division. They secured their spot in the Final by winning the US Derby. The Current finished 4th place in 2019 ISL Finals.

== Head coaches ==
David Marsh (2019–2021)

== 2019 International Swimming League season ==
=== Team roster ===
ISL teams had a maximum roster of 32 athletes for 2019 season, with a suggested size of each club's traveling roster of 28 (14 men and 14 women). Each club had a captain and a vice-captain of different gender. Majority of the Current roster consisted of Americans athletes but did include a few from other countries around the world.

(United States) LA Current
Men	Women
(United States) Nathan Adrian (C)	(United States) Bailey Andison
(Trinidad and Tobago) Dylan Carter	(United States) Kathleen Baker
(United States) Michael Chadwick	(United States) Maddy Banic
(United States) Jack Conger	(United States) Amy Bilquist
(United States) Matt Grevers	(Brazil) Jhennifer Conceição
(United States) Ryan Held	(United States) Ella Eastin
(United States) Chase Kalisz	(France) Béryl Gastaldello
(United States) Will Licon	(United States) Annie Lazor (vice-captain)
(Brazil) Felipe Lima	(United States) Linnea Mack
(United States) Ryan Murphy	(United States) Katie McLaughlin
(United States) Blake Pieroni	(Egypt) Farida Osman
(United States) Josh Prenot	(United States) Leah Smith
(United States) Andrew Seliskar	(United States) Kendyl Stewart
(United States) Tom Shields	(United States) Aly Tetzloff

=== Match results ===
Dates	Location	Venue	Teams	Results	MVP
Regular season
19–20 October	(United States) Lewisville	The LISD Westside Aquatic Center	(United Kingdom) London Roar 484.5 (United States) LA Current 457 (Hungary) Team Iron 402 (United States) New York Breakers 278.5		(Russia) Vladimir Morozov ( (Hungary) Team Iron) 43.5 pts
26–27 October	(Hungary) Budapest	Danube Arena	(United Kingdom) London Roar 505.5 (Hungary) Team Iron 425 (United States) LA Current 408 (United States) New York Breakers 292.5		(Hungary) Katinka Hosszú ( (Hungary) Team Iron) 47 pts
15–16 November	(United States) College Park	Geary F. Eppley Recreation Center	(United States) LA Current 495 (United States) Cali Condors 489 (United States) DC Trident 322.5 (United States) New York Breakers 315		(United States) Caeleb Dressel ( (United States) Cali Condors) 61.5 pts
Final Match
20–21 December	(United States) Las Vegas	Mandalay Bay Resort and Casino	(France) Energy Standard 453.5 (United Kingdom) London Roar 444 (United States) Cali Condors 415.5 (United States) LA Current 318		(United States) Caeleb Dressel ( (United States) Cali Condors) 121 pts

== 2020 International Swimming League season ==
=== Team roster ===
ISL teams had a maximum roster of 32 athletes for 2020 season, with a suggested size of each club's traveling roster of 28 (14 men and 14 women). Each club had a captain and a vice-captain of different gender. Due to the COVID-19 pandemic, the entire ISL 2020 season was held at the Danube Arena in Budapest, Hungary. From October 16 – November 22, all swimmers and coaching staff operated in a bio-secure bubble.

(United States) LA Current
Men	Women
(Trinidad and Tobago) Dylan Carter	(United States) Ali DeLoof
(Brazil) Marco Antonio Ferreira Jr.	(New Zealand) Helena Gasson
(Greece) Kristian Golomeev	(France) Béryl Gastaldello (vice-captain)
(Argentina) Santiago Grassi	(Israel) Anastasia Gorbenko
(Germany) Jacob Heidtmann	(United States) Alyssa Marsh
(United States) Will Licon	(United States) Katie McLaughlin
(United States) Ryan Murphy (C)	(Israel) Andi Murez
(United States) Josh Prenot	(United States) Claire Rasmus
(United States) Maxime Rooney	(United States) Makayla Sargent
(Brazil) Fernando Scheffer	(Argentina) Julia Sebastián
(United States) Andrew Seliskar	(Canada) Kierra Smith
(United States) Tom Shields	(United States) Kendyl Stewart
(Brazil) Felipe França Silva	(United States) Aly Tetzloff
(South Africa) Zane Waddell	(United States) Abbey Weitzeil
(Norway) Tomoe Zenimoto Hvas	(Australia) Madi Wilson
(Greece) Apostolos Christou	

=== Match results ===
Dates	Location	Venue	Teams	Results	MVP
Regular season
16–17 October (Match 1)	(Hungary) Budapest	Danube Arena	(United States) Cali Condors 567 (France) Energy Standard 463 (United States) LA Current 420 (United States) New York Breakers 266		(United States) Lilly King ( (United States) Cali Condors) 87.50 pts
24–25 October (Match 3)	(Hungary) Budapest	Danube Arena	(United States) LA Current 535.5 (Japan) Tokyo Frog Kings 506.5 (Canada) Toronto Titans 401 (Italy) Aqua Centurions 260		(France) Béryl Gastaldello ( (United States) LA Current) 78
30–31 October (Match 5)	(Hungary) Budapest	Danube Arena	(United Kingdom) London Roar 499 (United States) LA Current 478.5 (Japan) Tokyo Frog Kings 446.5 (United States) DC Trident 287.0		(United States) Tom Shields ( (United States) LA Current) 62.50
9-10 November (Match 10)	(Hungary) Budapest	Danube Arena	(United States) Cali Condors 558 (United States) LA Current 495 (United Kingdom) London Roar 398 (Italy) Aqua Centurions 255		(United States) Caeleb Dressel ( (United States) Cali Condors) 80.50
Semifinal
15-16 November (Semifinal 2)	(Hungary) Budapest	Danube Arena	(United States) Cali Condors 605.5 (United States) LA Current 462 (Hungary) Iron 340.5 (Canada) Toronto Titans 303		(United States) Caeleb Dressel ( (United States) Cali Condors) 90.5 pts
Final Match
21-22 November (Final)	(Hungary) Budapest	Danube Arena	(United States) Cali Condors 561.5 (France) Energy Standard 464.5 (United Kingdom) London Roar 391 (United States) LA Current 298		(United States) Caeleb Dressel ( (United States) Cali Condors) 96 pts
