= Aqua Centurions =

Professional swimming club based in Rome

- First season: 2019
- Association: International Swimming League
- Based in: Rome
- Head coach: Matteo Giunta
- General manager: Alessandra Guerra
- Captain: Federica Pellegrini

The Aqua Centurions is a professional swimming club and one of the original eight clubs of the International Swimming League. The team is based in Rome, IT led by general manager Alessandra Guerra and head coach Matteo Giunta.

The team participated at three matches in the first ISL season, starting with the first match in Indianapolis, USA, then Naples, Italy, continued and finished at the European Derby in London, UK, without making it to the Final in Las Vegas, USA.

== 2019 International Swimming League season ==
=== Team roster ===
ISL teams had a maximum roster of 32 athletes for 2019 season, with a suggested size of each club's travelling roster of 28 (14 men and 14 women). Each club had a captain and a vice-captain of different gender.

Centurions had a majority of Italians on their team with athletes from seven other countries around the world.

(Italy) AQUA CENTURIONS
MEN	WOMEN
(Greece) Apostolos Christou	(Brazil) Larissa Oliveira
(Italy) Santo Condorelli	(Germany) Sarah Köhler
(Brazil) Breno Correia	(Australia) Georgia Bohl
(Hungary) László Cseh	(Italy) Silvia Scalia
(Italy) Luca Dotto	(Germany) Franziska Hentke
(Greece) Kristian Golomeev	(Spain) Alba Vázquez
(Germany) Philip Heintz	(Italy) Ilaria Bianchi
(Australia) Travis Mahoney	(Italy) Silvia Di Pietro
(Italy) Nicolò Martinenghi	(United Kingdom) Freya Anderson
(Italy) Alessandro Miressi	(Italy) Federica Pellegrini (C)
(Italy) Matteo Rivolta	(Italy) Margherita Panziera
(Italy) Simone Sabbioni	(United Kingdom) Hannah Miley
(Italy) Fabio Scozzoli (VC)	(Italy) Martina Carraro
(Germany) Poul Zellmann	(Italy) Elena Di Liddo
	(Spain) Lidón Muñoz

=== Match results ===
In the 2019 inaugural ISL season, the Aqua Centurions fought despite the lack in athletes specialize in the Skin Races.

After the first race in Indianapolis, the Team improved in the "Home Edition" in Naples, Italy, with extraordinary results by Nicolò Martinenghi that almost had the same number of points than the MVP Caeleb Dressel in the first day, with only a four points difference. Due to an unlucky disqualification of Margherita Panziera the Team arrived 4^th for only half a point.

In the last race, the European Derby, the Centurions finished 3^rd behind Energy Standard and London Roar who eventually went on to place 1^st and 2^nd in the Championship Final in Las Vegas.

Dates	Location	Venue	Team Scores	Results	MVP
Regular season
5–6 October	(United States) Indianapolis	Indiana University Natatorium	Energy Standard 539 Cali Condors 457 DC Trident 330.5 Aqua Centurions 300.5		(Sweden) Sarah Sjöström (Energy Standard) 55.5 pts
12–13 October	(Italy) Naples	Piscina Felice Scandone	Energy Standard 493 Cali Condors 490.5 DC Trident 322 Aqua Centurions 321.5		(United States) Caeleb Dressel (Cali Condors) 57.5 pts
23–24 November	(United Kingdom) London	London Aquatics Centre	Energy Standard 467.5 London Roar 458.5 Aqua Centurions 369.5 Team Iron 335.5		(South Africa) Chad Le Clos (Energy Standard) 44.5 pts

== 2020 International Swimming League season ==
=== Team roster ===
(Italy) AQUA CENTURIONS
MEN	WOMEN
(Ukraine) Mykhailo Romanchuk	(Italy) Federica Pellegrini(C)
(Italy) Fabio Scozzoli(VC)	(Italy) Martina Carraro
(Hungary) Szebasztián Szabó	(Brazil) Etiene Medeiros
(Italy) Alessandro Miressi	(Belgium) Valentine Dumont
(Italy) Matteo Rivolta	(Spain) Lidón Muñoz
(Italy) Nicolò Martinenghi	(Italy) Arianna Castiglioni
(Brazil) Fabio Santi	(United States) Katrina Konopka Reid
(Brazil) Marcelo Chierighini	(Italy) Silvia Di Pietro
(Brazil) Leonardo de Deus	(Hungary) Katalin Burián
(Brazil) Gabriel Santos	(Canada) Haley Black
(Brazil) Pedro Spajari	(United Kingdom) Kathryn Greenslade
(Brazil) Breno Correia	(Italy) Stefania Pirozzi
(Brazil) Luiz Altamir Melo	(Switzerland) Alexandra Touretski
(Germany) Philip Heintz	(Greece) Theodora Drakou
(Greece) Apostolos Papastamos	(United Kingdom) Tain Bruce
	(France) Lara Grangeon

== 2021 International Swimming League season ==
=== Team roster ===
(Italy) AQUA CENTURIONS
MEN	WOMEN
(Italy) Stefano Ballo	(Australia) Holly Barratt
(Russia) Ilya Borodin	(Italy) Martina Caramignoli
(Italy) Thomas Ceccon	(Italy) Martina Carraro
(Italy) Matteo Ciampi	(Italy) Arianna Castiglioni
(Brazil) Marcelo Chierighini	(United Kingdom) Kathleen Dawson
(Brazil) Leonardo de Deus	(Italy) Elena Di Liddo
(Russia) Vladislav Grinev	(Italy) Silvia Di Pietro
(Italy) Nicolò Martinenghi	(United Kingdom) Holly Hibbott
(Italy) Alessandro Miressi	(Russia) Maria Kameneva
(United States) Chase Kalisz	(France) Fantine Lesaffre
(Netherlands) Arno Kamminga	(Spain) Lidón Muñoz
(Poland) Radosław Kawęcki	(Russia) Rozaliya Nasretdinova
(Italy) Matteo Rivolta	(Japan) Rika Omoto
(Italy) Simone Sabbioni	(Italy) Federica Pellegrini (C)
(Brazil) Fabio Santi	(Italy) Alessia Polieri
(Italy) Fabio Scozzoli (VC)	(Australia) Laura Taylor
(Hungary) Szebasztián Szabó	
