= 2018 FINA World Swimming Championships (25 m) – Women's 200 metre backstroke =

Women's 200 metre backstroke at the 2018 FINA World Swimming Championships (25 m)
- Venue: Hangzhou Sports Park Stadium
- Dates: 13 December
- Competitors: 33 from 30 nations
- Winning time: 2:00.71

Medalists
gold medal	Lisa Bratton	United States
silver medal	Kathleen Baker	United States
bronze medal	Emily Seebohm	Australia

The women's 200 metre backstroke competition of the 2018 FINA World Swimming Championships (25 m) was held on 13 December 2018.

== Records ==
Prior to the competition, the existing world and championship records were as follows.

	Name	Nation	Time	Location	Date
World record Championship record	Katinka Hosszú	Hungary	1:59.23	Doha	5 December 2014

== Results ==
=== Heats ===
The heats were started on 13 December at 10:44.

Rank	Heat	Lane	Name	Nationality	Time	Notes
1	4	7	Lisa Bratton	United States	2:01.00	Q
2	4	4	Emily Seebohm	Australia	2:02.68	Q
3	3	4	Kathleen Baker	United States	2:03.44	Q
4	2	5	Margherita Panziera	Italy	2:03.85	Q
5	4	3	Sayaka Akase	Japan	2:03.87	Q
6	3	3	Emi Moronuki	Japan	2:03.93	Q
7	2	4	Katinka Hosszú	Hungary	2:03.96	Q
7	3	5	Daria Ustinova	Russia	2:03.96	Q
9	4	5	Minna Atherton	Australia	2:03.98	
10	3	6	Peng Xuwei	China	2:04.14	
11	2	3	Liu Yaxin	China	2:05.25	
12	2	6	África Zamorano	Spain	2:06.03	
13	2	7	Jenny Mensing	Germany	2:06.44	
14	4	2	Andrea Berrino	Argentina	2:08.02	
15	2	2	Emma Godwin	New Zealand	2:08.31	
16	2	8	Ekaterina Avramova	Turkey	2:09.18	
17	3	1	Lena Grabowski	Austria	2:09.40	
18	3	8	Aela Janvier	Canada	2:09.97	
19	4	8	Gabriela Georgieva	Bulgaria	2:10.42	
20	4	0	Krystal Lara	Dominican Republic	2:10.92	NR
21	3	7	Wong Toto Kwan To	Hong Kong	2:11.72	
22	3	0	Karolína Hájková	Slovakia	2:12.35	
23	4	1	Signhild Joensen	Faroe Islands	2:12.40	
24	2	1	Tatiana Salcuțan	Moldova	2:13.87	
25	3	9	Hiba Fahsi	Morocco	2:15.95	NR
26	2	0	Trinidad Ardiles	Chile	2:17.44	NR
27	1	6	Camille Koenig	Mauritius	2:17.76	NR
28	4	9	Elizaveta Rogozhnikova	Kyrgyzstan	2:18.82	NR
29	2	9	Andrea Becali	Cuba	2:19.79	
30	1	4	Danielle Treasure	Barbados	2:23.99	
31	1	5	Eleonora Singsombath	Laos	2:37.27	
32	1	3	Roylin Akiwo	Palau	2:43.44	
33	1	2	Hamna Ahmed	Maldives	3:07.55	
	3	2	Alicja Tchórz	Poland	DNS	
	4	6	Michelle Coleman	Sweden	DNS	

=== Final ===
The final was held on 13 December at 19:24.

Rank	Lane	Name	Nationality	Time	Notes
1st place, gold medalist(s)	4	Lisa Bratton	United States	2:00.71	
2nd place, silver medalist(s)	3	Kathleen Baker	United States	2:00.79	
3rd place, bronze medalist(s)	5	Emily Seebohm	Australia	2:01.37	
4	1	Katinka Hosszú	Hungary	2:01.99	
5	6	Margherita Panziera	Italy	2:02.50	
6	8	Daria Ustinova	Russia	2:02.96	
7	2	Sayaka Akase	Japan	2:03.92	
8	7	Emi Moronuki	Japan	2:05.80	
