= Lisa Bratton =

American swimmer (born 1996)

Personal information
- Born: May 5, 1996 (age 30) Washington (state), U.S.

Sport
- Sport: Swimming
- Strokes: Backstroke, medley
- Club: Toronto Titans (ISL2020); DC Trident (ISL 2019)
- College team: Texas A&M Aggies
Medal record
Women's swimming
Representing the United States
World Championships (SC)
Gold medal – first place	2018 Hangzhou	200 m backstroke
Summer Universiade
Gold medal – first place	2019 Naples	200m backstroke

Lisa Bratton (born May 5, 1996) is an American professional swimmer for the Canadian based Toronto Titans of the International Swimming League.

Bratton won the gold medal in the 200 m backstroke at the 2018 FINA World Swimming Championships (25 m).

== Career ==
In summer 2019, Bratton was announced as a member of DC Trident for the inaugural ISL season. In spring of 2020 she signed for the first Canadian ISL team in the ISL, the Toronto Titans, for their first season.

At the 2018 FINA World Swimming Championships (25 m) in Hangzhou, Bratton won the gold medal in the 200 m backstroke.
