= Toronto Titans =

Canadian swim team

- First season: 2020
- Association: International Swimming League
- Based in: Toronto, Ontario
- Head coach: Byron MacDonald
- General manager: Robert Kent
- Captain: Kylie Masse and Brent Hayden
- Website: http://torontotitans.club

Toronto Titans were one of the two new teams for the professional International Swimming League 2020 season, announced in December 2019, taking the total number of teams in the league to ten. Toronto Titans were based in Toronto, Ontario and trained out of the Toronto Pan Am Sports Centre in Scarborough.

== 2020 International Swimming League season ==
=== Team roster ===
During the spring of 2020 Toronto Titans announced various signees to their roster for the planned 2020 ISL season, including Kylie Masse, Kayla Sanchez, Michael Chadwick, Blake Pieroni and Icelander, Anton McKee. Masse, a six-time gold medalist, four-time silver medalist and four-time bronze medalist is the captain for the team, while Brent Hayden, a four-time gold medalist, seven-time silver medalist and 11-time bronze medalist is the vice-captain.

(Canada) Toronto Titans
| Men | Women |
|---|---|
| (United States) Michael Chadwick | (United States) (Czech Republic) Anika Apostalon |
| (Canada) Mack Darragh | (United States) Lisa Bratton |
| (Russia) Sergey Fesikov | (Canada) Tessa Cieplucha |
| (Ukraine) Andrii Govorov | (Sweden) Michelle Coleman |
| (Canada) Brent Hayden (Vice-captain) | (Brazil) Jhennifer Conceição |
| (Canada) Yuri Kisil | (Russia) Anna Egorova |
| (Canada) Finlay Knox | (United States) Claire Fisch |
| (Russia) Aleksandr Krasnykh | (United Kingdom) Candice Hall |
| (Iceland) Anton McKee | (Sweden) Louise Hansson |
| (United Kingdom) Jay Lelliott | (South Africa) Tayla Lovemore |
| (Russia) Daniil Pasynkov | (Canada) Kylie Masse (C) |
| (Sweden) Erik Persson | (Luxembourg) Julie Meynen |
| (United States) Blake Pieroni | (Canada) Emily Overholt |
| (Canada) Cole Pratt | (Canada) Rebecca Smith |
| (Republic of Ireland) Shane Ryan | (United Kingdom) Jocelyn Ulyett |
| (Canada) Eli Wall | (Canada) Kelsey Wog |

=== Match results ===
| Dates | Location | Venue | Team Scores | Results | MVP |
Regular season
| 24–25 October | (Hungary) Budapest | Danube Arena | (United States) LA Current: 535.5 pts (Japan) Tokyo Frog Kings: 506.5 pts (Canada) Toronto Titans: 401 pts (Italy) Aqua Centurions: 260 pts | | (France) Béryl Gastaldello ( (United States) LA Current) 78 pts |
| 1–2 November | (Hungary) Budapest | Danube Arena | (France) Energy Standard: 609 pts (Canada) Toronto Titans: 448 pts (United States) New York Breakers: 354.5 pts (Italy) Aqua Centurions: 290.5 pts | | (Hong Kong) Siobhán Haughey ( (France) Energy Standard) 61.5 pts |
| 5–6 November | (Hungary) Budapest | Danube Arena | (France) Energy Standard: 613 pts (Hungary) Team Iron: 448 pts (Canada) Toronto Titans: 391 pts (United States) DC Trident: 256 pts | | (Turkey) Emre Sakçı ( (Hungary) Team Iron) 51 pts |
