= Lindsey Kozelsky =

American swimmer

Personal information
- Born: September 14, 1997 (age 28) Albert Lea, Minnesota, U.S.

Sport
- Sport: Swimming
- Strokes: Breaststroke
- Club: DC Trident; Mantas Swim Club
- College team: University of Minnesota

Lindsey Kozelsky (born September 14, 1997) is an American competitive swimmer who specializes in the breaststroke events. She is married to William Kozelsky, and her maiden name is Horejsi. She will represent DC Trident in the International Swimming League during the 2020 season.

== Early life ==
Lindsey Kozelsky was born in Albert Lea, Minnesota, as the daughter of Mark and Sue Horejsi. She attended Albert Lea High School, where she swam under coaches Jonathan Schmitz, Joey Clapp and Erik Johnson. Kozelsky broke the national high school record in the 100-yard breaststroke (58.56) at the 2015 Minnesota State High School Swimming & Diving meet, and competed at the 2016 U.S. Olympic Trials. She swam collegiately at the University of Minnesota from 2016 to 2020.

== College career ==
At her first Big Ten Championships in 2017, Kozelsky placed second in the 100-yard breaststroke, fourth in the 200-yard breaststroke, and 21st in the 50-yard freestyle. She also contributed to the first-place finish in the 200-yard medley relay. At the 2017 Women's NCAA Division I Championships she finished second in the 100-yard breaststroke and 11th in the 200-yard breaststroke.

As a sophomore for the Golden Gophers, Kozelsky placed second in the 100-yard breaststroke while setting a school record, third in the 200-yard breaststroke and 12th in the 200-yard IM. She also contributed to the 200 and 400-yard medley relays that took second and third respectively, and also set new school records. At the 2018 Women's NCAA Division I Championships, she placed third in the 100-yard breaststroke and seventh in the 200-yard breaststroke. She was also part of the 400-yard medley relay team that set a school record with a fifth-place, part of the 200-yard medley relay team that took sixth place.

At the 2019 Big Ten Championships, Kozelsky finished third in the 100-yard breaststroke, fifth in the 200-yard breaststroke and was part of the 200-yard medley relay team that placed fifth and the 400-yard medley relay that placed fourth. At the 2019 Women's NCAA Division I Championships, Kozelsky placed fourth in the 100-yard breaststroke, tenth in the 200-yard breaststroke, and contributed to the 400-yard medley relay team that placed seventh, as well as to the 200-yard medley relay that placed eleventh.

During her final season, Kozelsky placed third in the 100-yard breaststroke and seventh place in the 200-yard breaststroke at the Big Ten Championships, ultimately securing her spot to the 2020 NCAA Championships in both events.

== International career ==
Kozelsky competed at the 2012 US Olympic Trials, finishing 88th in the 100m breaststroke. Four years later, she placed 19th in the 100m breaststroke and 29th in the 200m breaststroke.

=== International Swimming League ===
Lindsey Kozelsky will compete for the DC Trident during the 2020 season of the International Swimming League.
