= Kelsey Wog =

Canadian swimmer (born 1998)

Personal information
- Full name: Kelsey Lauren Wog
- Born: September 19, 1998 (age 28) Regina, Saskatchewan, Canada
- Height: 170 cm (5 ft 7 in)

Sport
- Sport: Swimming
- Club: Cali Condors (ISL 2019); Toronto Titans (ISL 2020)
- College team: University of Manitoba
- Coach: Vlastimil Cerny
Medal record
Women's swimming
Representing Canada
World Championships (LC)
| Bronze medal – third place | 2022 Budapest | 4×100 m medley |
World Championships (SC)
| Silver medal – second place | 2016 Windsor | 200 m breaststroke |
| Silver medal – second place | 2022 Melbourne | 4×200 m freestyle |
Pan American Games
| Silver medal – second place | 2023 Santiago | 200 m breaststroke |
Universiade
| Gold medal – first place | 2017 Taipei | 4×100 m freestyle |
Junior Pan Pacific Championships
| Silver medal – second place | 2016 Maui | 200 m breaststroke |
| Silver medal – second place | 2016 Maui | 4×100 m medley |
| Bronze medal – third place | 2014 Maui | 4×100 m medley |
| Bronze medal – third place | 2016 Maui | 100 m breaststroke |

Kelsey Lauren Wog (born September 19, 1998) is a Canadian former breaststroke swimmer. She won a silver medal in the 200 m breaststroke at the 2016 FINA World Swimming Championships (25 m). At the 2016 Junior Pan Pacific Swimming Championships in Maui, Wog captured two individual medals. She earned silver in the 200-m breaststroke and bronze in the 100 m breaststroke. She also contributed to a silver medal in the 4×100-m medley relay with teammates Danielle Hanus, Rebecca Smith and Sarah Darcel. She is a resident of Winnipeg, Manitoba, and is currently a member of the Toronto Titans for the International Swimming League.

She was named to the Canadian team for the 2020 Summer Olympics, where she placed twenty-third in the heats of the 100 m breaststroke and was disqualified from the 200 m breaststroke.

At the 2022 World Aquatics Championships, Wog placed first in the heats of the 200 m breakstroke, and then fifth in the semi-finals to qualify for the event final. She was fourth in the event final, 0.66 seconds behind American bronze medalist Kate Douglass. She remarked "fourth is fourth but I'm really proud of my effort." Wog then competed the breaststroke leg for Team Canada in the heats of the 4 × 100 m medley relay, helping the team qualify to the final in fourth position. She was replaced in the final by Rachel Nicol, but shared in the team's bronze medal win. At the age of 26, she retired from swimming in 2024.

== Awards and honours ==
- 2020 Manitoba Bisons Female Athlete of the Year
- 2020 Lieutenant Governor Athletic Awards Recipient
