= Abrahm DeVine =

American swimmer

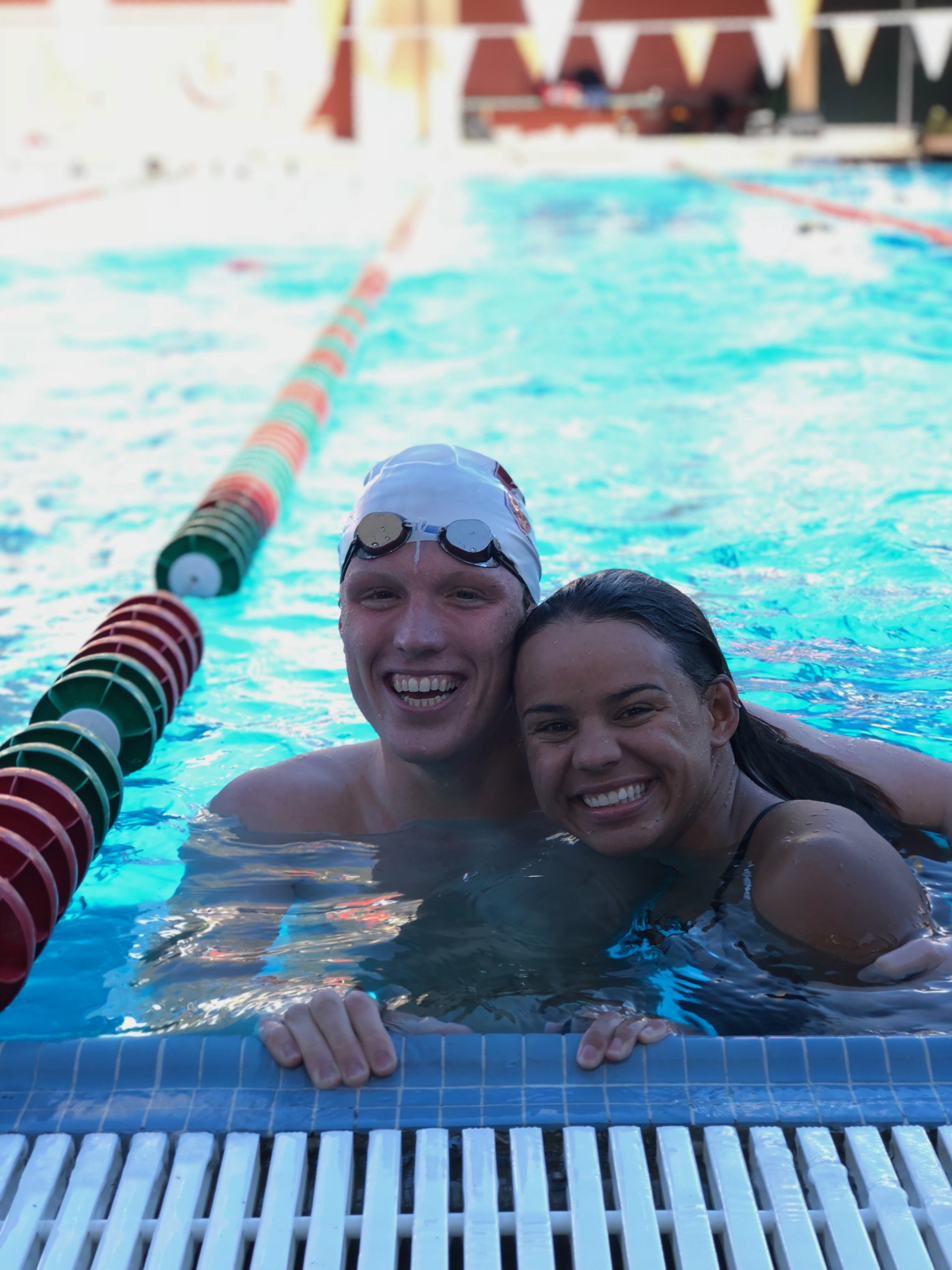
- Devine (left) in 2018

Personal information
- Born: September 3, 1996 (age 30) Seattle, Washington, U.S.
- Height: 6 ft 2 in (188.0 cm)

Sport
- Sport: Swimming
- Strokes: Individual Medley (IM), freestyle, backstroke, butterfly stroke
- Club: Cascade Swim Club, • Lakeside Lions, • Team Elite • International Swimming League's DC Trident
- College team: Stanford University Cardinal

Abrahm David DeVine (born September 3, 1996) is an American former competitive swimmer from Seattle. He currently represents the LA Current, which is part of the International Swimming League. His first international competition was in the men's 200 metre Individual Medley (IM) event at the 2017 World Aquatics Championships held in Budapest. As of June 2019, DeVine has been with International Swimming League's DC Trident. In 2018, he came out as gay, making him one of "very few openly gay swimmers competing on the elite level."

== Early life and education ==
Abrahm DeVine was born in Seattle to Rene Folk and Jim DeVine. He grew up in Seattle and was introduced to swimming by his mother when he was an infant. In the 1970s, Folk lived in Anamosa, Iowa, where she worked at the swimming pool teaching kids how to swim and coaching the swim team. Abrahm joined a summer league when he was five and a year-round team, Cascade Swim Club, when he was six years old. There, he met his “core group” which he had through Lakeside High School. He remained on the team for twelve years.

By his sophomore and junior years in high school, he made junior nationals and nationals. He was an All-American in 2013, 2014, and 2015. In 2014, he made the Junior National Team. His main event was the 400 Individual Medley (IM). He was a state champion in 2013 and a double state champion in 2014 and 2015.

DeVine earned a scholarship to Stanford University in Palo Alto, California, where he obtained a degree in a computer science while swimming on the Stanford Cardinal team. In June 2016, he was in the U.S. Olympic Trials for swimming in Omaha, Nebraska, and he placed fifth in the 200 IM. He was a finalist in the 400 IM at the 2016 FINA World Swimming Championships in Windsor, Ontario, Canada.

== Career ==
DeVine's first international competition was in the men's 200 metre Individual Medley (IM) event at the 2017 World Aquatics Championships held in Budapest. In 2017, he finished tenth in the 200 IM as a member of the U.S. FINA World Championships team. In his junior season at Stanford, he became a National Collegiate Athletic Association (NCAA) champion in the 400 IM, and he was named the Pac-12 Conference Swimmer of the Year. In 2018, DeVine placed second in the 200 IM at U.S. Summer Nationals, which qualified him for the Pan Pacific Swimming Championships in Tokyo, where he finished fifth. In his senior year at Stanford he again was NCAA champion in the 400 IM, he was also named a member of Team USA for the 2018–19 season. In 2019, he placed eighth in the IM at the FINA World Championships held in Gwangju, South Korea. As of April 2019, he is a fifteen-time All-American. He holds several Stanford swimming records: the 400 IM (3:35.29) by four seconds; top three times in the 200 freestyle (1:32.77); top three times in 200 backstroke (1:39.22); and top three times in 200 IM (1:40.35). In May 2019, Swimming World listed him as twelfth in its ranking of NCAA Division I men's swimmers.

In June 2019, DeVine was added as a member to the International Swimming League's DC Trident. In July 2019, DeVine signed with Arena, a sportswear company specializing in swimwear. As of August 2019, he swims with Team Elite in San Diego. In September 2019, DeVine says he was dropped from the Stanford team due to homophobia which team coaches denied in a statement.

In 2018 when asked about his post-swimming career interests, DeVine cited being intrigued by startup culture, and the environmental movement.

== Personal life ==
In 2016 or 2017, DeVine's parents started collecting ukuleles. Abrahm has since been practicing and learning music.

In 2018, he came out as gay, making him one of "very few openly gay swimmers competing on the elite level."
