= Molly Hannis =

American swimmer (born 1992)

Personal information
- Full name: Molly Catherine Hannis
- Nationality: United States
- Born: March 13, 1992 (age 34) Santa Rosa, California, U.S.
- Occupations: Professional swimmer Swim Coach
- Height: 5 ft 7 in (1.70 m)
- Weight: 70 kg (154 lb)

Sport
- Sport: Swimming
- Strokes: Breaststroke
- Club: Tennessee Aquatics (Knoxville); Cali Condors
- College team: University of Tennessee
- Coach: Matt Kredich (U. of Tennessee); David Marsh (2016 Olympics)
Medal record
World Championships (SC)
Gold medal – first place	2016 Windsor	4×50 m medley
Gold medal – first place	2016 Windsor	4×100 m medley
Bronze medal – third place	2016 Windsor	50 m breaststroke
Bronze medal – third place	2016 Windsor	100 m breaststroke
Pan American Games
Gold medal – first place	2019 Lima	4×100 m medley

Molly Catherine Hannis (born March 13, 1992) is an American competition swimmer who competed for the University of Tennessee, and participated in the 200-meter breaststroke at the 2016 Rio Olympics, finishing in 16th place. She won two gold and two bronze medals at the 2016 FINA World Championships in medley and breaststroke events, and a gold medal at the 2019 Pan American games in Lima, Peru. Continuing to specialize in breaststroke events, she has represented the Cali Condors which is part of the International Swimming League.

== Biography ==
=== Early life and family ===
Molly Hannis was born March 13, 1992 in Santa Rosa, California to Michael and Terry Hannis. From a family of aquatic stars, her father was a swimmer at Shippensburg University, and her brother Tyler competed at the University of the Pacific. Her other brother Cory was a diver at Santa Rosa Junior College.

Molly attended Santa Rosa High School, where she set five Santa Rosa records. Distinguished in her speciality, in 2009 she swam the 100-yard breast stroke, in the second fastest time in the nation. As a college prospect, Swimming World Magazine rated here as a five-star recruit. She was the third graduate of Santa Rosa High School to swim for the Tennessee Volunteers. In the 100-yard breast stroke and the 200-yard individual medley, she was a NISCA All American seven times. During High School, she participated in Student Government, and ran Cross Country.

At the 2008 Olympics trials, she finished 23rd in the 100-meter breaststroke.

=== University of Tennessee ===
Majoring in Sports and Recreation, Hannis attended the University of Tennessee on scholarship, where she competed for the Tennessee Volunteers swimming and diving team from 2011 to 2015 under Head Coach Matt Kredich and Assistant Coach Jennifer Woodruff. During her four years in college, Hannis was a 2-time NCAA champion and a 14-time NCAA All-American.

=== 2016 Rio de Janeiro Olympics ===
At the 2016 US Olympic trials in Omaha, Hannis placed second in the 200 meter breaststroke and qualified for the 2016 Summer Olympics in Rio de Janeiro. She swam a 2:26.80 in the 200-meter breaststroke at the Rio de Janeiro Olympics under Head U.S. Women's Olympic Coach David Marsh, putting her in 16th place. Rie Keneto of Japan won the gold with a time of 2:20.30, Yuliya Yefimova of Russia won the silver with a time of 2:21.97, and Shi Jinglin of China won the bronze with a time of 2:28.28.

=== International Swimming League ===
In 2019 she was a member of the inaugural International Swimming League representing the Cali Condors, who finished in third place in the final match in Las Vegas, Nevada in December. Hannis finished 2nd in the 50 meter breaststroke and 3rd in the 100 meter breaststroke at the final. In the 2020 Season, she continued to swim with the Cali Condors and helped them win their 1st ISL title. Hannis finished 4th in the 200 Breaststroke, 4th in the 50 Breaststroke, 3rd in the 100 Breaststroke, and finished 2nd in the Breaststroke skins.

In the 2019 Pan American Games in Lima, Peru, she was part of the preliminary U.S. team that won a gold medal in the 100-meter medley.

She retired from professional swimming in 2021.

== Personal life ==
In May 2020, Hannis announced her engagement to swimmer Matthew Dunphy, and the couple have since wed and had children.

=== Coaching ===
As Molly (Hannis) Dunphy, after moving to Savannah with her husband, she became a new assistant swim coach at the Savannah College of Art & Design (SCAD), part of the NAIA Powerhouse Program, in 2024. She had served as a volunteer Assistant Coach at the University of Tennessee and had been a clinician at Fitter and Faster Swim Tours since retiring from competition.

=== Honors ===
To attend the University of Tennessee, Molly received the Wayne Basler Women's Athletic Swimming/Diving Scholarship.
