= Mohamed Hassan (swimmer) =

Egyptian swimmer

Personal information
- Born: 13 February 1972 (age 54)

Sport
- Sport: Swimming

Mohamed Hassan (born 13 February 1972) is an Egyptian swimmer. He competed in two events at the 1988 Summer Olympics.
