= Tokyo Frog Kings =

Japanese swimming team

- First season: 2020
- Association: International Swimming League
- Based in: (Japan) Tokyo
- Head coach: Dave Salo
- General manager: Kosuke Kitajima

The Tokyo Frog Kings is a professional swimming team in the International Swimming League (ISL) established in 2020. The COVID-19 pandemic disrupted the 2020 ISL competition which limited the teams including 2020 expansion teams Tokyo Frog Kings and Toronto Titans to a short competition staged in Budapest, Hungary.

== Record ==
- 2020 : 6th
- 2021 :

== Swimmer ==
=== 2021 season ===
- (United States) Bowe Becker
- (Hungary) Richárd Bohus
- (Netherlands) Maarten Brzoskowski
- (Russia) Ivan Girev
- (Japan) Tomoru Honda
- (Japan) Takeshi Kawamoto
- (Japan) Yasuhiro Koseki
- (Russia) Vladimir Morozov
- (Hungary) Nandor Nemeth
- (Russia) Daniil Pasynkov
- (Italy) Alessandro Pinzuti
- (Italy) Federico Poggio
- (Venezuela) Cristian Quintero
- (Japan) Daiya Seto
- (Brazil) Pedro Spajari
- (Australia) Zac Stubblety-Cook
- (Russia) Grigoriy Tarasevich
- (Japan) Tomomi Aoki
- (United States) Mallory Comerford
- (United States) Catherine DeLoof
- (United States) Gabby DeLoof
- (Japan) Suzuka Hasegawa
- (Japan) Chihiro Igarashi
- (United States) Leah Gingrich
- (United Kingdom) Harriet Jones
- (United Kingdom) Keanna MacInnes
- (United States) Paige Madden
- (Luxembourg) Julie Meynen
- (Japan) Yui Ohashi
- (United States) Leah Smith
- (United States) Aly Tetzloff
- (United States) Miranda Tucker
- (Japan) Kanako Watanabe
- (United Kingdom) Cassie Wild

=== 2020 season ===
- (Brazil) Bruno Fratus
- (Japan) Kosuke Hagino
- (Japan) Ryosuke Irie
- (Japan) Yuki Kobori
- (Japan) Kosuke Matsui
- (Japan) Katsuhiro Matsumoto
- (Japan) Naoki Mizunuma
- (Japan) Shoma Sato
- (Japan) Shinri Shioura
- (South Africa) Brad Tandy
- (Canada) Markus Thormeyer
- (Japan) Reona Aoki
- (Japan) Runa Imai
- (Czech Republic) Simona Kubová
- (Greece) Anna Ntountounaki
- (Japan) Natsumi Sakai
- (Japan) Aya Sato
- (Japan) Sakiko Shimizu
- (Japan) Rio Shirai
- (Japan) Ai Soma
- (Japan) Miho Teramura
