= Shoma Sato (swimmer) =

Japanese swimmer (born 2001)

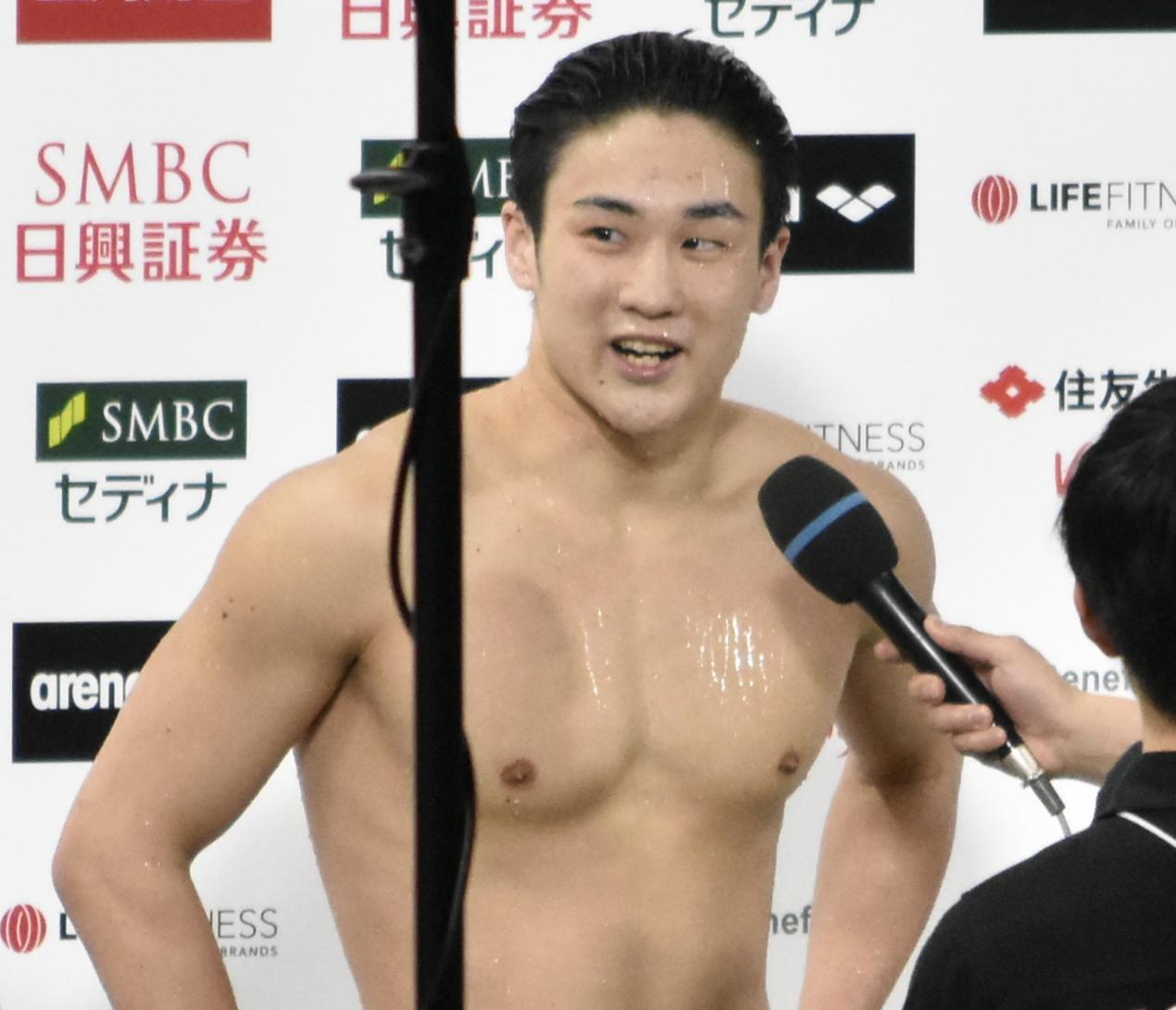
- 2020,

Personal information
- Born: 8 February 2001 (age 25) Tokyo, Japan
- Height: 1.76 m (5 ft 9 in)

Sport
- Sport: Swimming
Medal record
Representing Japan
World Junior Championships
Silver medal – second place	2019 Budapest	200 m breaststroke

Shoma Sato (born 8 February 2001) is a Japanese swimmer. He competed in the 2020 Summer Olympics.
