= Anika Apostalon =

Czech-American competitive swimmer (born 1995)

Personal information
- Nationality: American, Czech
- Born: Albuquerque, New Mexico, United States

Sport
- Sport: Swimming
- Strokes: Backstroke, Freestyle
- Club: Toronto Titans (ISL)
- College team: San Diego State University; University of Southern California
- Coach: Dave Salo

Anika Apostalon (born February 1995) is a Czech-American competitive swimmer who specializes in freestyle and backstroke events. She was born in Albuquerque, New Mexico and graduated from Albuquerque Academy in 2013. Apostalon graduated from the University of Southern California in 2017. She swam for the Toronto Titans and was affiliated with USK in Prague, CZ. She was the former Czech national record holder in the 50m Freestyle (SCM) and is a 17-time NCAA All American.

== Career ==
=== Collegiate career ===
Apostalon began her collegiate career at San Diego State University, where she was a Division I dual-sport athlete in water polo and swimming. In 2014 she was named the Mountain West Swimmer of the Year and the conference's Freshman of the year. She also set the Mountain West records for 50-yard freestyle, 100-yard freestyle, and 100-yard backstroke while at SDSU.

In 2015, Apostalon transferred to the University of Southern California to focus on her swimming career. In 2016 she led the Trojans to a Pac-12 Championship. She was a member of the 2016 400 yard freestyle NCAA national championship relay. Apostalon finished her college career as a 17-time NCAA All-American and eight-time individual scorer at the NCAA national championships. However, her successes have not been limited to swimming. As a senior, Apostalon made the CoSIDA Academic All-American Division I At-Large Team and was named the Pac-12 Women's Swimming Scholar Athlete of the Year. She was also named the Trojans' female recipient of the 2016-17 Tom Hansen Medal.

=== Czech Republic ===
In July, 2018, Apostalon qualified for the Czech Republic national team and set a national record in the 100-meter freestyle. She went on to represent the Czech Republic in the 2018 European Championships in Glasgow, Scotland. She finished 12th in the 50m Freestyle and 11th in the 100m Freestyle. At the 2019 World Championships, Apostalon anchored the Czech 4x100 Freestyle Relay with a team-best split of 54.26 to place 11th and help the team qualify for the 2020 Tokyo Olympics. Apostalon currently holds the Czech national record in the 50m Freestyle (SCM), the 4x100 Freestyle Relay (LCM), 4x50 Freestyle Relay (SCM), and 4x50 Medley Relay (SCM).

=== International Swimming League ===
In fall of 2019 Apostalon signed for DC Trident in the ISL's inaugural season. In spring 2020, Apostalon signed for the newly formed Toronto Titans, the first Canadian based ISL team.
