= Jocelyn Ulyett =

British swimmer

Personal information
- Nationality: British
- Born: 17 September 1995 (age 30)

Sport
- Sport: Swimming
- Club: International Swimming League

Jocelyn Ulyett (born 17 September 1995) is a British professional swimmer. She is also British record holder in the short-course 200m breaststroke. Having accomplished this at the Swim England Winter Championships 2019 with a time of 2.17.10, she then went on to set the 100m short-course English record.

== Career ==
Ulyett competed in the women's 200 metre breaststroke event at the 2017 World Aquatics Championships. Ulyett set a new long-course British record for the 200M breaststroke at the British Swimming Championships in 2017 at Ponds Forge, Sheffield, with a time of 2:22:08.

In the Autumn of 2019 Ulyett was member of the inaugural International Swimming League swimming for the Energy Standard International Swim Club, who won the team title in Las Vegas, Nevada, in December. In spring 2020, she signed for the Toronto Titans.
