= Team Iron =

Hungarian swimming team

- First season: 2019
- Association: International Swimming League
- Based in: Budapest (Hungary)
- Head coach: Jozsef Nagy
- General manager: Dorina Szekeres
- Captain: Katinka Hosszú

Team Iron is a professional swimming team co-owned by Katinka Hosszú, and a founding member of the International Swimming League (ISL). The team is based in Budapest, Hungary, led by general manager Dorina Szekeres and head coach Jozsef Nagy.

During the inaugural season in 2019, they finished third in the European group and failed to advance to the ISL Grand Finale hosted at the Mandalay Bay Resort and Casino in Las Vegas.

The team hosted one of the seven matches of the inaugural season in the Duna Arena, in Budapest, where they placed second in front of the home crowd. The visiting teams were London Roar, LA Current and New York Breakers.

== 2019 International Swimming League season ==
=== Team roster ===
ISL teams had a maximum roster of 32 athletes for 2019 season, with a suggested size of each club's traveling roster of 28 (14 men and 14 women). Each club had a captain and a vice-captain of different gender. In the 2019 season Katinka Hosszú and Peter John Stevens held those titles for Team Iron.

(Hungary) Team Iron
Men	Women
(United States) Gunnar Bentz	(Russia) Veronika Andrusenko
(Hungary) Richárd Bohus	(Jamaica) Alia Atkinson
(Norway) Henrik Christiansen	(Hungary) Katalin Burián
(Switzerland) Jérémy Desplanches	(Netherlands) Kim Busch
(Romania) Robert Glință	(Belgium) Kimberly Buys
(Hungary) Gergely Gyurta	(Hungary) Katinka Hosszú (C)
(Hungary) Dominik Kozma	(Hungary) Zsuzsanna Jakabos
(Hungary) Kristóf Milák	(Hungary) Ajna Késely
(Russia) Vladimir Morozov	(Netherlands) Ranomi Kromowidjojo
(United Kingdom) Ross Murdoch	(Finland) Jenna Laukkanen
(Sweden) Erik Persson	(Belgium) Fanny Lecluyse
(Slovenia) Peter John Stevens (C)	(Denmark) Mie Nielsen
(Hungary) Szebasztián Szabó	(Netherlands) Kira Toussaint
(Hungary) Ádám Telegdy	(Spain) Jessica Vall
(Belgium) Pieter Timmers	(Switzerland) Maria Ugolkova
(Hungary) Dávid Verrasztó	

=== Match results ===
In the 2019 (inaugural) ISL season, Team Iron finished third in the European group behind Energy Standard and London Roar who eventually went on to place 1–2 in the Championship Final. From Team Iron, Vladimir Morozov was named MVP in Lewisville while Katinka Hosszú earned the title in Budapest in front of the home crowd.

The team was very successful in the 50m freestyle skin races. Vladimir Morozov won the race in Lewisville and London while Ranomi Kromowidjojo had a perfect record of winning the event in all 3 matches of the regular season.

Dates	Location	Venue	Teams	Results	MVP
Regular season
19–20 October	(United States) Lewisville	The LISD Westside Aquatic Center	(Hungary) Team Iron (United States) LA Current (United Kingdom) London Roar (United States) New York Breakers		(Russia) Vladimir Morozov ( (Hungary) Team Iron) 43.5 pts
26–27 October	(Hungary) Budapest	Danube Arena	(Hungary) Team Iron (United States) LA Current (United Kingdom) London Roar (United States) New York Breakers		(Hungary) Katinka Hosszú ( (Hungary) Team Iron) 47 pts
23–24 November	(United Kingdom) London	London Aquatics Centre	(Italy) Aqua Centurions (France) Energy Standard (Hungary) Team Iron (United Kingdom) London Roar		(South Africa) Chad le Clos ( (France) Energy Standard) 44.5 pts
