= London Roar =

Swimming club in London, England

- First season: 2019
- Association: International Swimming League
- Based in: London
- Head coach: Steven Tigg
- General manager: Rob Woodhouse
- Captain: Adam Peaty, Sydney Pickrem, Alia Atkinson, Guilherme Guido

London Roar is a professional swimming club based in London and one of the first clubs of the International Swimming League (ISL) to be formed. It was formed in March 2019, with an international roster of swimmers including Adam Peaty who was among the first to support the formation of ISL independent of FINA. It is run by its general manager Rob Woodhouse. London hosted the sixth of the seven meets in ISL's inaugural season in 2019. The team finished second in 2019 and third in 2020.

== Team roster ==
Six swimmers were named as co-captains in seasons one: Sydney Pickrem, Kyle Chalmers, Adam Peaty, Mireia Belmonte, Cate Campbell and James Guy. Peaty and Pickrem were initially announced as captains in the second season, followed by Alia Atkinson and Guilherme Guido. The team roster changes from year to year, ranging in number 32 to 36 swimmers, although only 28, 12 men and 12 women plus 2 men and 2 women for the relay, competed in ISL events. As of 2020, the team roster is:

(United Kingdom) London Roar
Men	Women
(United Kingdom) Adam Peaty (C)	(United Kingdom) Aimee Willmott
(France) Amaury Leveaux	(Jamaica) Alia Atkinson
(Greece) Andreas Vazaios	(United Kingdom) Anna Hopkin
(Germany) Christian Diener	(United States) Annie Lazor
(Republic of Ireland) Darragh Greene	(United Kingdom) Emily Large
(United Kingdom) Duncan Scott	(United Kingdom) Freya Anderson
(United Kingdom) Elliot Clogg	(United Kingdom) Harriet West
(Brazil) Guilherme Guido	(United Kingdom) Holly Hibbott
(United Kingdom) James Guy	(United Kingdom) Kathleen Dawson
(Japan) Katsumi Nakamura	(Netherlands) Kira Toussaint
(Russia) Kirill Prigoda	(Russia) Maria Kameneva
(United Kingdom) Luke Greenbank	(France) Marie Wattel
(Germany) Marius Kusch	(United Kingdom) Siobhan-Marie O'Connor
(Russia) Mikhail Vekovishchev	(Canada) Sydney Pickrem (C)
(United Kingdom) Scott Mclay	(Australia) Minna Atherton
(United Kingdom) Tom Dean	(Australia) Emma McKeon
(Brazil) Vinicius Lanza	(Australia) Cate Campbell
(Australia) Kyle Chalmers	(Australia) Bronte Campbell

== Competition history ==
London Roar reached the final of the first season of the International Swimming League in 2019 in Las Vegas, and finished second behind Energy Standard.

The 2020 International Swimming League was held in Budapest at the Duna Arena, which was used throughout the tournament. London Roar finished third in the final.

Team member Adam Peaty broke the short-course 100m breaststroke world record twice. Kira Toussaint broke the short-course 50m backstroke world record in the semi-finals.
