= Energy Standard =

French swimming club

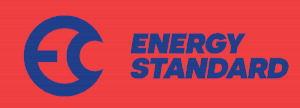
- First season: 2019
- Association: International Swimming League
- Based in: Paris (France)
- Head coach: James Gibson
- General manager: Jean-François Salessy
- Captain: Chad le Clos & Sarah Sjöström
- Overall record: 4-0
- League titles: 2 (2019, 2021)
- Website: http://eliteteamenergystandard.org

Energy Standard was one of the four founding European teams for the International Swimming League. The team was based in Paris, France and trained at the Gloria Sports Arena in Belek, Turkey.

The team won each of their matches in the first season of ISL, starting with the first match in Indianapolis, USA then Naples, Italy. They continued their winning streak at the European Derby in London, GBR and took the inaugural championship title in the finale in Las Vegas, USA.

The head coach from 2019–2021 was James Gibson.

== 2019 International Swimming League season ==
=== Team roster ===
ISL teams had a maximum roster of 32 athletes for 2019 season, with a suggested size of each club's traveling roster of 28 (14 men and 14 women). Each club had a captain and a vice-captain of different gender. Energy Standard had the most culturally diverse team of the league with athletes from 14 different countries representing the program.

(France) Energy Standard
| Men | Women |
|---|---|
| (Lithuania) Simonas Bilis | (France) Charlotte Bonnet |
| (Russia) Anton Chupkov | (United Kingdom) Imogen Clark |
| (Russia) Ivan Girev | (United Kingdom) Georgia Davies |
| (Russia) Kliment Kolesnikov | (Turkey) Viktoriya Zeynep Güneş |
| (South Africa) Chad le Clos (C) | (Canada) Mary-Sophie Harvey |
| (United Kingdom) Max Litchfield | (Netherlands) Femke Heemskerk |
| (France) Florent Manaudou | (France) Fantine Lesaffre |
| (United Kingdom) Ben Proud | (Canada) Penny Oleksiak |
| (Ukraine) Mykhailo Romanchuk | (Canada) Kayla Sanchez |
| (Russia) Evgeny Rylov | (Australia) Emily Seebohm |
| (Japan) Daiya Seto | (Belarus) Anastasiya Shkurdai |
| (Ukraine) Sergey Shevtsov | (Sweden) Sarah Sjöström (vice-captain) |
| (Belarus) Ilya Shymanovich | (Canada) Kierra Smith |
| (Russia) Maxim Stupin | (Canada) Rebecca Smith |
| (Estonia) Kregor Zirk | (United Kingdom) Jocelyn Ulyett |
| | (Hong Kong) Siobhán Haughey |
| | (United Kingdom) Kayla van der Merwe |

=== Match results ===
In the 2019 (inaugural) ISL season, Energy Standard maintained an undefeated 4–0 record. Team co-captain, Sarah Sjöström was named season MVP after amassing 243.5 points.

| Dates | Location | Venue | Team Scores | Results | MVP |
Regular season
| 5–6 October | (United States) Indianapolis | Indiana University Natatorium | (France) Energy Standard 539 (United States) Cali Condors 457 (United States) DC Trident 330.5 (Italy) Aqua Centurions 300.5 | | (Sweden) Sarah Sjöström ( (France) Energy Standard) 55.5 pts |
| 12–13 October | (Italy) Naples | Piscina Felice Scandone | (France) Energy Standard 493 (United States) Cali Condors 490.5 (United States) DC Trident 322 (Italy) Aqua Centurions 321.5 | | (United States) Caeleb Dressel ( (United States) Cali Condors) 57.5 pts |
| 23–24 November | (United Kingdom) London | London Aquatics Centre | (France) Energy Standard 467.5 (United Kingdom) London Roar 458.5 (Italy) Aqua Centurions 369.5 (Hungary) Iron 335.5 | | (South Africa) Chad le Clos ( (France) Energy Standard) 44.5 pts |
Final Match
| 20–21 December | (United States) Las Vegas | Mandalay Bay Resort and Casino | (France) Energy Standard 453.5 (United Kingdom) London Roar 444 (United States) Cali Condors 415.5 (United States) LA Current 318 | | (United States) Caeleb Dressel ( (United States) Cali Condors) 121 pts |

== 2020 International Swimming League season ==
During the winter of 2020 Energy Standard announced various signees to their roster for the planned second ISL season, including Felipe Lima, Pernille Blume, Jérémy Desplanches, Siobhán Haughey and Zsuzsanna Jakabos.
