= Lee and Joe Jamail Texas Swimming Center =

Swimming Center of University of Texas

Coordinates: 30°16′47″N 97°44′0″W

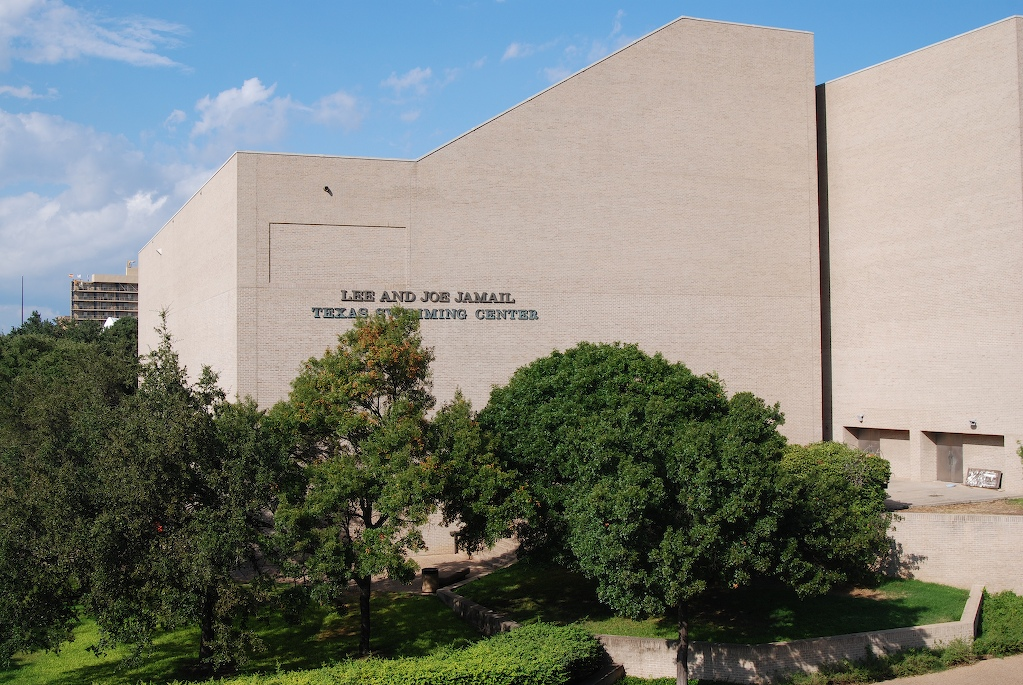
- Exterior of the Jamail Texas Swimming Center
- Interactive map of Lee and Joe Jamail; Texas Swimming Center
- Full name: Lee and Joe Jamail Texas Swimming Center
- Address: Austin, Texas, United States
- Capacity: 2,600

Construction
- Opened: 1977

Tenants
- Texas Longhorns (NCAA); Longhorn Aquatics

The Lee and Joe Jamail Texas Swimming Center is an aquatics facility at the University of Texas at Austin in the US It is home to the university's swimming and diving teams, a variety of university-offered swimming and scuba-diving classes, as well as Longhorn Aquatics, a youth program. The facility also hosts the annual State high school championships in swimming and diving, run by the University Interscholastic League.

The building is named after UT graduate and longtime benefactor Joe Jamail and his wife Lee. Before the Jamail's name was placed on the facility in the mid-1990s, the building was known simply as the "Texas Swimming Center". The view of the Texas State Capitol from the building's terrace became one of the Capitol View Corridors protected under state and local law from obstruction by tall buildings in 1983.

== Amenities ==
The building houses two separate pools:

- The main pool, used for competitive swimming, is 50 meters long by 25 yards wide and is 9 feet deep. Two retractable bulkheads, stored on cranes in recesses in the ceiling of the building, can be lowered and maneuvered, allowing the pool a variety of possible configurations. Some of these include: a long course practice setup, with ten 50m lanes; short course practice, with anywhere from 16 to 22 25-yard lanes; competition long course with eight 50m lanes; competition short course with eight 25 yard/meter competition lanes, and warm up/down lanes; competition short-course with sixteen 25-yard lanes (two courses of 8 lanes each); and competition center course with eight 25-yard lanes centered between several warm up/down lanes on either side.
- The diving well is 25 yards long by 25 yards wide. The north end of the well houses 4 separate 1-meter springboards and two 3-meter springboards and is 15 feet deep. The south end of the well houses the platform tower with 1-, 3-, 5-, 7.5-, and 10-meter platforms, as well as four 3-meter springboards; this end is 18 feet deep. Both ends have a bubbler system, which creates bubbles in the water that can lessen the surface tension of the water. The diving well can also be arranged as a lap pool.

== Pool records ==
=== Men's short course pool records ===
As of September 21, 2020

Event	Time	Name	University/Club	Meet	Date	Notes
50 y freestyle	18.63	Ryan Hoffer	California	2019 NCAA Division I Men's Swimming and Diving Championships	28 March 2019	
100 y freestyle	40.80	Dean Farris	Harvard	2019 NCAA Division I Men's Swimming and Diving Championships	30 March 2019	
200 y freestyle	1:29.15(r)	Dean Farris	Harvard	2019 NCAA Division I Men's Swimming and Diving Championships	27 March 2019	NCAA, American, and U.S. Open record. Relay leadoff
500 y freestyle	4:08.19	Townley Haas	Texas	2019 NCAA Division I Men's Swimming and Diving Championships	28 March 2019	
1000 y freestyle	8:33.93	Clark Smith	Texas	Texas Hall of Fame Invitational	5 December 2015	NCAA, American, and U.S. Open record
1650 y freestyle	14:23.09	Felix Auboeck	Michigan	2019 NCAA Division I Men's Swimming and Diving Championships	30 March 2019	
100 y backstroke	43.66	Dean Farris	Harvard	2019 NCAA Division I Men's Swimming and Diving Championships	29 March 2019	
200 y backstroke	1:36.42	John Shebat	Texas	2019 NCAA Division I Men's Swimming and Diving Championships	30 March 2019	
100 y breaststroke	49.85	Ian Finnerty	Indiana	2019 NCAA Division I Men's Swimming and Diving Championships	29 March 2019	
200 y breaststroke	1:48.66	Kevin Cordes	Arizona	2014 NCAA Division I Men's Swimming and Diving Championships	29 March 2014	
100 y butterfly	44.06	Joseph Schooling	Texas	2017 Big 12 Conference Championships	24 February 2017	
200 y butterfly	1:38.57	Andreas Vazaios	NC State	2019 NCAA Division I Men's Swimming and Diving Championships	30 March 2019	
200 y individual medley	1:38.14	Andrew Seliskar	California	2019 NCAA Division I Men's Swimming and Diving Championships	28 March 2019	
400 y individual medley	3:34.50	Chase Kalisz	Georgia	2014 NCAA Division I Men's Swimming and Diving Championships	28 March 2014	
4×50 y freestyle relay	1:14.46	Pawel Sendyk (18.84) Ryan Hoffer (18.43) Michael Jensen (18.79) Andrew Seliskar (18.40)	California	2019 NCAA Division I Men's Swimming and Diving Championships	28 March 2019	
4×100 y freestyle relay	2:45.12	Daniel Krueger (41.73) John Shebat (41.65) Tate Jackson (40.98) Townley Haas (40.76)	Texas	2019 NCAA Division I Men's Swimming and Diving Championships	30 March 2019	
4×200 y freestyle relay	6:05.08	Drew Kibler (1:32.06) Austin Katz (1:31.45) Jeff Newkirk (1:31.91) Townley Haas (1:29.66)	Texas	2019 NCAA Division I Men's Swimming and Diving Championships	27 March 2019	NCAA, American, and U.S. Open record
4×50 y medley relay	1:22.26	Zane Waddell (20.41) Laurent Bams (23.24) Knox Auerbach (20.39) Robert Howard (18.22)	Alabama	2019 NCAA Division I Men's Swimming and Diving Championships	29 March 2019	
4×100 y medley relay	2:59.70	Gabriel Fantoni (45.25) Ian Finnerty (49.60) Vini Lanza (44.21) Zach Apple (40.64)	Indiana	2019 NCAA Division I Men's Swimming and Diving Championships	28 March 2019	

=== Women's short course pool records ===
As of September 22, 2020

Event	Time	Name	University/Club	Meet	Date	Notes
50 y freestyle	21.02	Abbey Weitzeil	California	2019 NCAA Division I Women's Swimming and Diving Championships	21 March 2019	
100 y freestyle	46.26	Mallory Comerford	Louisville	2019 NCAA Division I Women's Swimming and Diving Championships	23 March 2019	
200 y freestyle	1:40.26(r)	Mallory Comerford	Louisville	2019 NCAA Division I Women's Swimming and Diving Championships	22 March 2019	
500 y freestyle	4:31.34	Brooke Forde	Stanford	2019 NCAA Division I Women's Swimming and Diving Championships	21 March 2019	
1000 y freestyle	9:21.00	Lotte Friis	North Baltimore Aquatic Club	American Short Course Championships	7 March 2015	
1650 y freestyle	15:28.36	Katie Ledecky	Nation's Capital Swim Club	2012 Winter National Championships	1 December 2012	
100 y backstroke	49.18	Beata Nelson	Wisconsin	2019 NCAA Division I Women's Swimming and Diving Championships	22 March 2019	NCAA record
200 y backstroke	1:47.24	Beata Nelson	Wisconsin	2019 NCAA Division I Women's Swimming and Diving Championships	23 March 2019	NCAA record
100 y breaststroke	55.73	Lilly King	Indiana	2019 NCAA Division I Women's Swimming and Diving Championships	22 March 2019	NCAA, American, and U.S. Open record
200 y breaststroke	2:02.90	Lilly King	Indiana	2019 NCAA Division I Women's Swimming and Diving Championships	23 March 2019	
100 y butterfly	49.26	Louise Hansson	USC	2019 NCAA Division I Women's Swimming and Diving Championships	22 March 2019	NCAA and U.S. Open record
200 y butterfly	1:50.28	Louise Hansson	USC	2019 NCAA Division I Women's Swimming and Diving Championships	23 March 2019	
200 y individual medley	1:50.79	Beata Nelson	Wisconsin	2019 NCAA Division I Women's Swimming and Diving Championships	21 March 2019	
400 y individual medley	3:57.03	Ella Eastin	Stanford	2019 NCAA Division I Women's Swimming and Diving Championships	22 March 2019	
4×50 y freestyle relay	1:24.55	Maddie Murphy (21.82) Katie McLaughlin (21.37) Amy Bilquist (20.87) Abbey Weitzeil (20.49)	California	2019 NCAA Division I Women's Swimming and Diving Championships	21 March 2019	NCAA, American, and U.S. Open record
4×100 y freestyle relay	3:06.96	Isabel Ivey (47.79) Katie McLaughlin (46.62) Amy Bilquist (46.48) Abbey Weitzeil (46.07)	California	2019 NCAA Division I Women's Swimming and Diving Championships	23 March 2019	
4×200 y freestyle relay	6:47.22	Katie Drabot (1:43.99) Ella Eastin (1:41.03) Taylor Ruck (1:39.83) Brooke Forde (1:42.37)	Stanford	2019 NCAA Division I Women's Swimming and Diving Championships	20 March 2019	
4×50 y medley relay	1:34.10	Meghan Small (24.03) Nikol Popov (26.51) Maddy Banic (22.58) Erika Brown (20.98)	Tennessee	2019 NCAA Division I Women's Swimming and Diving Championships	22 March 2019	
4×100 y medley relay	3:25.24	Amy Bilquist (50.84) Ema Rajic (58.53) Katie McLaughlin (50.00) Abbey Weitzeil (45.87)	California	2019 NCAA Division I Women's Swimming and Diving Championships	21 March 2019	
