= 2019 USA Swimming Championships =

National Swimming Championships in 2019

The 2019 Phillips 66 National Swimming Championships were held from July 31 to August 4, 2019, at the Avery Aquatic Center in Stanford, California.

== Men's events ==
Event	Gold		Silver		Bronze	
50 m freestyle	Ryan Held	21.87	Robert Howard Bowe Becker	22.00	Not awarded	
100 m freestyle	Ryan Held	47.39 CR	Maxime Rooney	47.61	Tate Jackson	47.88
200 m freestyle	Elijah Winnington	1:46.19	Kieran Smith	1:46.25	Dean Farris	1:46.45
400 m freestyle	Elijah Winnington	3:47.39	Jake Mitchell	3:48.09	Bobby Finke	3:48.17
800 m freestyle	Bobby Finke	7:47.58	Zane Grothe	7:50.47	Michael Brinegar	7:54.56
1500 m freestyle	Bobby Finke	14:51.15	Zane Grothe	14:56.10	Michael Brinegar	15:00.82
100 m backstroke	Shaine Casas	52.72	Yohann Ndoye Brouard	53.80	Clark Beach	53.95
200 m backstroke	Austin Katz	1:55.72	Shaine Casas	1:55.79	Clark Beach	1:57.14
100 m breaststroke	Devon Nowicki	59.69	Craig Benson	59.79	Reece Whitley	1:00.05
200 m breaststroke	Reece Whitley	2:09.69	Daniel Roy	2:10.01	Josh Matheny	2:11.02
100 m butterfly	Maxime Rooney	51.09	Jack Conger	51.70	Jack Saunderson	51.76
200 m butterfly	Luca Urlando	1:54.92	Miles Smachlo	1:55.94	Nicolas Albiero	1:56.05
200 m IM	Ryan Lochte	1:57.76	Shaine Casas	1:58.83	Jake Foster	1:59.15
400 m IM	Bobby Finke	4:13.15	Carson Foster	4:13.39	Jake Foster (swimmer)	4:15.03

== Women's events ==
Event	Gold		Silver		Bronze	
50 m freestyle	Erika Brown	24.71	Gretchen Walsh	24.85	Anna Santamans	24.92
100 m freestyle	Abbey Weitzeil	53.18	Gretchen Walsh Erika Brown	54.13	Not awarded	
200 m freestyle	Allison Schmitt	1:56.97	Paige Madden	1:57.84	Brooke Forde	1:57.98
400 m freestyle	Ally McHugh	4:07.08	Haley Anderson	4:07.77	Sierra Schmidt	4:07.79
800 m freestyle	Ally McHugh	8:26.04	Sierra Schmidt	8:27.13	Ashley Twichell	8:27.36
1500 m freestyle	Ally McHugh	16:05.98	Kensey McMahon	16:09.80	Sierra Schmidt	16:10.12
100 m backstroke	Amy Bilquist	59.64	Claire Curzan	1:00.39	Caitlin Brooks	1:00.46
200 m backstroke	Asia Seidt	2:08.90	Emma Seiberlich Erin Voss	2:10.86	Not awarded	
100 m breaststroke	Breeja Larson	1:06.78	Kaitlyn Dobler	1:07.23	Miranda Tucker	1:07.33
200 m breaststroke	Madisyn Cox	2:23.84	Abby Arens	2:25.80	Jenna Strauch	2:26.05
100 m butterfly	Kelsi Dahlia	57.35	Amanda Kendall	57.51	Aly Tetzloff	57.70
200 m butterfly	Regan Smith	2:07.26	Lillie Nordmann	2:07.43	Dakota Luther	2:07.76
200 m IM	Madisyn Cox	2:10.00	Vanessa Pearl	2:12.49	Julia Poole	2:12.53
400 m IM	Emma Weyant	4:35.47	Brooke Forde	4:36.06	Ally McHugh	4:38.65
