= Dean Farris =

American swimmer (born 1997)

Personal information
- National team: United States
- Born: November 14, 1997 (age 29) Atlanta, Georgia, United States

Sport
- Sport: Swimming
- Strokes: Backstroke, freestyle
- Club: Metro Atlanta Aquatic Club (former)
- College team: Harvard University
- Coach: Mike Norment (former)
Medal record
Men's swimming
Representing United States
Event	1st	2nd	3rd
World University Games	2	0	0
Total	2	0	0
World University Games
Gold medal – first place	2019 Naples	4×100 m freestyle
Gold medal – first place	2019 Naples	4×200 m freestyle
Representing the Harvard Crimson
Event	1st	2nd	3rd
NCAA Championships	2	0	0
Total	2	0	0
By race
Event	1st	2nd	3rd
100 y freestyle	1	0	0
100 y backstroke	1	0	0
Total	2	0	0
NCAA Championships
Gold medal – first place	2019 Austin	100 y freestyle
Gold medal – first place	2019 Austin	100 y backstroke

Dean Farris (born November 14, 1997) is an American former swimmer. From 2019 until 2024 he was the American record holder in the 200 yard freestyle. He won the 2019 NCAA Division I Championships titles in the 100 yard backstroke and 100 yard freestyle. At the 2019 World University Games he won two gold medals, one in the 4×100 meter freestyle relay and one in the 4×200 meter freestyle relay.

== Early life and education ==
Farris was born November 14, 1997, and raised in Atlanta, Georgia. He attended The Paideia School for high school where he competed scholastically as part of the school swim team. For college, Farris attended Harvard University where he competed as part of the Harvard Crimson swim team.

== Career ==
=== 2015–2017 ===
In January 2015, Farris was highlighted by SwimSwam as one of the "Weekly Wonders of Age Group Swimming" for achieving two times faster than national-level cut-off times, once each in the 200 yard backstroke and 200 yard individual medley. By mid-October of the same year, Farris had committed to competing collegiately for Harvard University as part of the Harvard Crimson. On February 24, 2017, Farris swam a 1:32.71 in the prelims heats of the 200 yard freestyle at the 2017 Ivy League Men's Swimming and Diving Championships, breaking the 37-year-old pool record set at Blodgett Pool on the Harvard University campus by Rowdy Gaines of Auburn University in 1980 with a time of 1:34.57. In the final of the 200 yard freestyle later the same day, Farris lowered his own pool record by over one full second to a time of 1:31.56.

=== 2019 ===
==== 2019 NCAA Championships ====
2019 NCAA Championships
Gold medal – first place	100 yd backstroke	43.66
Gold medal – first place	100 yd freestyle	40.80

At the 2019 NCAA Division I Championships in Austin, Texas, Farris led-off the 4×200 yard freestyle with a time of 1:29.15 for his 200 yards of freestyle and set new American and US Open records in the 200 yard freestyle, which broke the previous record of 1:29.50 set by Townley Haas in 2018. In the 100 yard backstroke, Farris won his first individual NCAA title with a time of 43.66 seconds, which made him the second American in history to swim the event in less than 44 seconds, only after the American record holder in the event, Ryan Murphy. Farris won his second NCAA title later in the Championships in the 100 yard freestyle, finishing first with a time of 40.80 seconds to out-touch second-place finisher Bowe Becker by three hundredths of a second and becoming the third-fastest performer in the event behind Caeleb Dressel of the Florida Gators and Vladimir Morozov of the USC Trojans.

With his two NCAA title wins in individual events, Farris became the third swimmer from Harvard University to win two such titles in 54 years, an accomplishment that contributed to him earning the "Male Athlete of the Year" honor from The Harvard Crimson. Following his success at the 2019 NCAA Championships, Farris decided to take a red-shirt year during the 2019–2020 collegiate season to prepare for the 2020 Summer Olympics, deciding to train in long course meters at the University of Texas with Eddie Reese during his time away. His red-shirt year coincided with the NCAA Division I Championships being canceled in 2020 due to the COVID-19 pandemic.

==== 2019 World University Games ====
2019 World University Games
Gold medal – first place	4×100 m freestyle	3:11.03
Gold medal – first place	4×200 m freestyle	7:09.77

At Piscina Felice Scandone on the first day of swimming competition at the 2019 World University Games in Naples, Italy in July, Farris won his first gold medal in the final of the 4×100 meter freestyle relay, splitting a 47.48 for the second leg of the relay and helping his final relay teammates Zach Apple, Robert Howard, and Tate Jackson achieve the time of 3:11.03 to attain the gold medal. In the prelims of the 4×100 meter freestyle relay, Farris swam a 47.08 for the relay's second leg. Farris won his second gold medal of the World University Games in the 4×200 meter freestyle relay, contributing a split of 1:48.73 for the lead-off leg in the final and helping to reach a total relay time of 7:09.77 with his final relay teammates Grant House, Trenton Julian, and Zach Apple.

==== 2019 National Championships ====
Less than one month later, Farris competed at the 2019 US National Championships in Stanford, California. In the 100 meter freestyle, Farris placed fourth with a personal best time of 48.07 seconds, which was less than two tenths of a second behind bronze medalist in the event Tate Jackson. For the 200 meter freestyle, Farris won the bronze medal in a time of 1:46.45, finishing 0.2 second behind silver medalist Kieran Smith. In the b-final of the 100 meter backstroke, Farris took first place in 53.93 seconds. Concluding his competition at the year's National Championships, Farris placed sixth in the b-final of the 50 meter freestyle with a time of 22.57 seconds.

=== 2020 US Olympic Trials ===
Leading up to the 2020 US Olympic Trials in Omaha, Nebraska, and held in June 2021 due to the COVID-19 pandemic, Farris was highlighted by NBC Sports as a top US swimmer to watch at the last Pro Swim Series competition before the Olympic Trials. Come the US Olympic Trials, SwimSwam noted Farris and his perseverance in making it through to the semifinals of competition in the 100 meter freestyle. Farris did not make the 2020 US Olympic Team in any of his events, placing 13th in the 100 meter backstroke in the semifinals with a time of 54.17 seconds, 15th in the 100 meter freestyle semifinals at 49.15 seconds, 19th in the 100 meter butterfly with a personal best time of 52.95 seconds, and 30th in the 50 meter freestyle with a time of 22.68 seconds.

=== 2021–2022 Collegiate season ===
Returning to Harvard University for the 2021–2022 collegiate season, Farris won the 100 yard butterfly and placed second in the 50 yard freestyle in a double dual meet between his school, Dartmouth College, and Cornell University. As part of a relay during practice leading up to championships season in the collegiate season, Farris swam 75 yards of freestyle with fins from a push-start in 28.7 seconds. In response to Farris's time, Brooks Curry of Louisiana State University swam a 75 yard freestyle sprint in fins, also from a push-start, in 28.6 seconds. In mid-January, Farris won the 200 yard freestyle in 1:35.57 and the 100 yard freestyle with a 43.32 in a meet against Stanford University and the University of the Pacific. Later the same month, in a dual meet against the University of Pennsylvania, Farris won the 100 yard backstroke in 46.71 and the 100 yard freestyle with a time of 43.95 seconds. In a meet against Princeton University and Yale University, Farris won the 100 yard butterfly with a time of 46.30 seconds and the 200 yard freestyle in 1:33.60.

==== 2022 Ivy League Championships ====
The first day of the 2022 Ivy League Championships, February 23, Farris helped achieve a win in the 4×50 yard medley relay with a 1:24.06, leading-off with a 21.22 for the backstroke leg of the relay. In the next event, the 4×200 yard freestyle relay, he swam a 1:31.80 for the fourth-leg of the relay to contribute to the winning time of 6:16.19 and help set a new pool record. In the prelims heats of the 50 yard freestyle on day two, he finished in 19.37 seconds to qualify for the final ranked first and 0.04 seconds ahead of the second-ranked swimmer. For the final, he finished second in 19.43 seconds, just 0.01 second behind the first-place finisher. The following day, Farris ranked second across all prelims heats of the 200 yard freestyle with a 1:35.38 and qualified for the final. He dropped over two and a half seconds from his prelims swim in the final, winning the event with a 1:32.67. For his second event of the finals session, he swam a 45.39 for the backstroke leg of the 4×100 yard medley relay to help win the event with a final time of 3:05.72, which set new Ivy League and pool records. Starting off the fourth and final day, he swam a 43.05 in the prelims heats of the 100 yard freestyle, ranking second heading into the final. He claimed the conference title for the 100 yard freestyle in the final with a time of 41.97 seconds. Closing out the final Ivy League Championships of his collegiate career, Farris swam a 41.15 for the anchor leg of the last event of the Championships, the 4×100 yard freestyle relay, helping achieve a first-place victory in an Ivy League and pool record time of 2:50.40.

His wins contributed to Harvard Crimson winning the Championships with a total of 1,596 points, which was 104 points ahead of the second-place team and marked the fifth-consecutive Ivy League Championships title win for the men of Harvard Crimson swimming and diving. In an interview with The Harvard Crimson published on March 2, Farris spoke of the strength of the team members during his time on the team and projecting into the future, "In my freshman year we kind of built a powerhouse, and we've continued it from there. We have some great recruits coming in, so I'm really pumped to come back and sit in the stands to watch these guys."

==== 2022 NCAA Championships ====
Beginning the 2022 NCAA Division I Championships on day one, March 23, Farris competed in back-to-back relays, leading-off with a 20.36 for the backstroke portion of the 4×50 yard medley relay to help place ninth, and splitting a 1:29.85 on the second leg of the 4×200 yard freestyle relay to help achieve a fifteenth-place finish. On the second day, he split a time of 18.49 seconds for the second leg of the 4×50 yard freestyle relay to help achieve a ninth-place finish in 1:15.88. For the preliminary heats of the 100 yard backstroke on the morning of day three, he ranked sixth with a time of 44.55 seconds, qualifying for the final. He finished seventh in the final with a time of 44.68 seconds. Later in the same session, he led-off the 4×100 yard medley relay with a 44.59, helping attain a final time of 3:03.24 and eleventh-place finish. Starting off day four, he qualified for the b-final of the 100 yard freestyle with a time of 41.68 seconds and overall rank of twelfth in the morning prelims heats. He won the b-final with a time of 41.42 seconds. For his final event of the Championships, the 4×100 yard freestyle relay, he helped achieve a ninth-place finish, swimming the fastest split of all relay swimmers with a 40.51.

The final day of the Championships, SwimSwam published an article saying Farris announced his intent to permanently retire from competitive swimming for the first time upon the conclusion of competition, with the news outlet claiming he would never return to competition.

== International championships ==
Meet	4×100 freestyle relay	4×200 freestyle relay
WUG 2019	1st place, gold medalist(s)	1st place, gold medalist(s)

== Career best times ==
=== Long course meters (50 m pool) ===
Event	Time		Meet	Location	Date	Ref
50 m freestyle	22.32	h	2019 U.S. Open	Atlanta, Georgia	December 5, 2019	
100 m freestyle	48.07	h	2019 US National Championships	Stanford, California	July 31, 2019	
200 m freestyle	1:46.45		2019 US National Championships	Stanford, California	August 1, 2019	
50 m backstroke	25.70	b	2018 US National Championships	Irvine, California	July 27, 2018	
100 m backstroke	53.93		2019 US National Championships	Stanford, California	August 3, 2019	
50 m butterfly	24.27	h, †	2020 US Olympic Trials	Omaha, Nebraska	June 18, 2021	
100 m butterfly	52.95	h	2020 US Olympic Trials	Omaha, Nebraska	June 18, 2021	

Legend: h – heat; † – en route to final mark; b – b-final

=== Short course yards (25 yd pool) ===
Event	Time		Meet	Location	Date	Notes	Ref
100 yd freestyle	40.80		2019 NCAA Championships	Austin, Texas	March 29, 2019		
200 yd freestyle	1:29.15	r	2019 NCAA Championships	Austin, Texas	March 27, 2019	Former NR, former US	
100 yd backstroke	43.66		2019 NCAA Championships	Austin, Texas	March 29, 2019		

Legend: e – equalled existing record; NR – American record; US – US Open record;
Records not set in finals: h – heat; sf – semifinal; r – relay 1st leg; rh – relay heat 1st leg; b – B final; † – en route to final mark; so – swim-off; tt – time trial

== National records ==
=== Short course yards (25 yd pool) ===
No.	Event	Time		Meet	Location	Date	Age	Type	Status	Ref
1	200 yd freestyle	1:29.15	r	2019 NCAA Championships	Austin, Texas	March 27, 2019	21	NR, US	Former	

Legend: e – equalled existing record; NR – American record; US – US Open record;
Records not set in finals: h – heat; sf – semifinal; r – relay 1st leg; rh – relay heat 1st leg; b – B final; † – en route to final mark; so – swim-off; tt – time trial

== Awards and honors ==
- The Harvard Crimson, Athlete of the Year (male): 2019
- SwimSwam, Weekly Wonders of Age Group Swimming: January 16–19, 2015
