= 2018 Pan Pacific Swimming Championships – Men's 200 metre freestyle =

Men's 200 metre freestyle at the 2018 Pan Pacific Swimming Championships
- Venue: Tokyo Tatsumi International Swimming Center
- Dates: 9 August (heats & finals)
- Competitors: 38 from 13 nations
- Winning time: 1:45.56

Medalists
gold medal	Townley Haas	United States
silver medal	Andrew Seliskar	United States
bronze medal	Katsuhiro Matsumoto	Japan

The men's 200 metre freestyle competition at the 2018 Pan Pacific Swimming Championships took place on August 9 at the Tokyo Tatsumi International Swimming Center. The defending champion was Thomas Fraser-Holmes of Australia.

== Records ==
Prior to this competition, the existing world and Pan Pacific records were as follows:

World record	Paul Biedermann (GER)	1:42.00	Rome, Italy	28 July 2009
Pan Pacific Championships record	Ian Thorpe (AUS)	1:44.75	Yokohama, Japan	24 August 2002

== Results ==
All times are in minutes and seconds.

KEY:	QA	Qualified A Final	QB	Qualified B Final	CR	Championships record	NR	National record	PB	Personal best	SB	Seasonal best

=== Heats ===
The first round was held on 9 August from 10:00.

Only two swimmers from each country may advance to the A or B final. If a country not qualify any swimmer to the A final, that same country may qualify up to three swimmers to the B final.

Rank	Name	Nationality	Time	Notes
1	Andrew Seliskar	United States	1:45.81	QA
2	Townley Haas	United States	1:46.19	QA
3	Alexander Graham	Australia	1:46.35	QA
4	Jack Cartwright	Australia	1:46.38	~~QA~~, WD
5	Katsuhiro Matsumoto	Japan	1:46.42	QA
6	Clyde Lewis	Australia	1:46.54	QA
7	Zachary Apple	United States	1:46.56	QB
7	Blake Pieroni	United States	1:46.56	QB
9	Kyle Chalmers	Australia	1:46.62	~~QB~~, WD
10	Fernando Scheffer	Brazil	1:46.63	QA
11	Mack Horton	Australia	1:46.66	QB
12	Conor Dwyer	United States	1:46.84	
13	Jack Conger	United States	1:46.85	
14	Luiz Altamir Melo	Brazil	1:47.19	QA
15	Elijah Winnington	Australia	1:47.47	QB
16	Naito Ehara	Japan	1:47.67	QA
17	Reo Sakata	Japan	1:47.68	QB
18	Caeleb Dressel	United States	1:47.89	
19	Austin Katz	United States	1:48.44	
20	Markus Thormeyer	Canada	1:48.83	QB
21	Jeremy Bagshaw	Canada	1:48.90	QB
22	Yuki Kobori	Japan	1:49.33	QB
23	Alex Pratt	Canada	1:49.35	
24	Ruslan Gaziev	Canada	1:49.74	
25	Javier Acevedo	Canada	1:49.84	
26	Wesley Roberts	Cook Islands	1:49.96	
27	Juran Mizohata	Japan	1:50.21	
28	Owen Daly	Canada	1:50.35	
29	Abrahm Devine	United States	1:51.83	
30	Liu Shaofeng	China	1:52.65	
31	Mack Darragh	Canada	1:53.26	
32	Jarod Hatch	Philippines	1:55.99	
33	Samir Al-Adawi	Oman	1:58.67	
34	Noel Keane	Palau	2:05.51	NR
35	Armand Chan	Philippines	2:07.64	
36	Mark Imazu	Guam	2:13.17	
37	Nelson Batallones	Northern Mariana Islands	2:18.42	
–	Federico Grabich	Argentina	DNS	

=== B Final ===
The B final was held on 9 August from 17:30.

Rank	Name	Nationality	Time	Notes
9	Blake Pieroni	United States	1:46.68	
10	Zachary Apple	United States	1:46.78	
11	Mack Horton	Australia	1:47.90	
12	Elijah Winnington	Australia	1:48.04	
13	Markus Thormeyer	Canada	1:48.23	
14	Jeremy Bagshaw	Canada	1:48.88	
15	Reo Sakata	Japan	1:48.94	
16	Yuki Kobori	Japan	1:49.32	

=== A Final ===
The A final was held on 9 August from 17:30.

Rank	Name	Nationality	Time	Notes
1st place, gold medalist(s)	Townley Haas	United States	1:45.56	
2nd place, silver medalist(s)	Andrew Seliskar	United States	1:45.74	
3rd place, bronze medalist(s)	Katsuhiro Matsumoto	Japan	1:45.92	
4	Fernando Scheffer	Brazil	1:46.12	
5	Alexander Graham	Australia	1:46.50	
6	Naito Ehara	Japan	1:46.90	
7	Clyde Lewis	Australia	1:46.94	
8	Luiz Altamir Melo	Brazil	1:47.43	
