= Drew Kibler =

American swimmer (born 2000)

Personal information
- Full name: Drew Kibler
- Nickname: Drew
- National team: United States
- Born: March 9, 2000 (age 26) Carmel, Indiana, U.S.
- Height: 6 ft 5 in (196 cm)
- Weight: 195 lb (88 kg)

Sport
- Sport: Swimming
- Strokes: Freestyle
- Club: Carmel Swim Club; Longhorn Aquatics
- College team: University of Texas at Austin
- Coach: Eddie Reese
Medal record
Men's swimming
Representing the United States
Event	1st	2nd	3rd
Olympic Games	0	1	0
World Championships (LC)	1	1	1
World Championships (SC)	1	0	1
Pan American Games	0	2	1
World Junior Championships	0	1	0
Junior Pan Pac Championships	6	2	1
Total	8	7	4
Olympic Games
Silver medal – second place	2024 Paris	4x200 m freestyle
World Championships (LC)
Gold medal – first place	2022 Budapest	4×200 m freestyle
Silver medal – second place	2023 Fukuoka	4×200 m freestyle
Bronze medal – third place	2022 Budapest	4×100 m mixed freestyle
World Championships (SC)
Gold medal – first place	2022 Melbourne	4×200 m freestyle
Bronze medal – third place	2022 Melbourne	4×100 m freestyle
Pan American Games
Silver medal – second place	2019 Lima	4×100 m freestyle
Silver medal – second place	2019 Lima	4×200 m freestyle
Bronze medal – third place	2019 Lima	200 m freestyle
World Junior Championships
Silver medal – second place	2017 Indianapolis	4×200 m freestyle
Junior Pan Pac Championships
Gold medal – first place	2016 Maui	4×100 m freestyle
Gold medal – first place	2018 Suva	100 m freestyle
Gold medal – first place	2018 Suva	200 m freestyle
Gold medal – first place	2018 Suva	4×100 m freestyle
Gold medal – first place	2018 Suva	4×200 m freestyle
Gold medal – first place	2018 Suva	4×100 m medley
Silver medal – second place	2016 Maui	4×200 m freestyle
Silver medal – second place	2018 Suva	50 m freestyle
Bronze medal – third place	2016 Maui	200 m freestyle

Andrew Patrick “Drew” Kibler (born March 9, 2000) is a retired American competition swimmer specializing in freestyle events. He is a world record holder in the short course 4×200 meter freestyle relay and a former American record holder in the 4×200 yard freestyle relay. He won a gold medal in the 4×200 meter freestyle relay each at the 2022 World Aquatics Championships (long course) and the 2022 World Short Course Championships and placed fourth in the event at the 2020 Summer Olympics. He is an Olympic silver medalist in the 4x200 meter freestyle relay at the 2024 Paris Olympics. In the 200 meter freestyle, he took fourth-place at both the 2022 World Aquatics Championships and the 2022 World Short Course Championships. He is also a three-time NCAA champion in the 4×200 yard freestyle relay, winning NCAA titles in the event in 2019, 2021, and 2022.

== Background ==
Kibler was born with a hearing impairment, wears hearing aids outside the pool but not in the water, and works through difficulties hearing whistles signaling to competitors a race is about to start at swimming competitions.

== Career ==
=== 2016–2018 ===
In August 2016, at the Junior Pan Pacific Swimming Championships for the year, Kibler won a gold medal in the 4×100 meter freestyle relay, a silver medal in the 4×200 meter freestyle relay, the bronze medal in the 200 meter freestyle, won the b-final of the 50 meter freestyle, placed second in the b-final of the 100 meter freestyle, and placed nineteenth in the 400 meter freestyle.

As part of the 4×200 meter freestyle relay at the 2017 FINA World Junior Swimming Championships, held in Indianapolis in August, Kibler won a silver medal, swimming the anchor leg of the relay in the preliminaries in a time of 1:48.43. He also initially won a gold medal as part of the 4×100 meter medley relay, swimming backstroke in the final, however the medal was later disqualified due to an anti-doping rule violation by one of his fellow relay teammates. In his non-medaling events, he placed fourth in the 100 meter backstroke with a time of 54.97 seconds, fifteenth in the 100 meter butterfly with a 53.80, and helped achieve a fourth-place finish in the 4×100 meter freestyle relay, splitting a 50.04 for the third leg of the relay in the final after swimming on the prelims relay as well.

The following year, at the 2018 Junior Pan Pacific Swimming Championships, held in August in Suva, Fiji, he won the 200 meter freestyle with a Championships record time of 1:47.65 as well as winning gold medals in the 100 meter freestyle, 4×100 meter freestyle relay, 4×200 meter freestyle relay, and 4×100 meter medley relay, a silver medal in the 50 meter freestyle, and placing second in the b-final of the 100 meter butterfly.

=== 2019 ===
==== 2019 NCAA Championships ====
At the 2019 NCAA Championships in Austin, Texas in March, Kibler set new NCAA, American, and US Open records with relay teammates Austin Katz, Jeff Newkirk, and Townley Haas in the 4×200 yard freestyle relay in a time of 6:05.08, leading-off the relay on the first 200-yard stretch with a 1:32.06. He also won the bronze medal in the 200 yard freestyle with a time of 1:31.76, placed ninth in the 50 yard freestyle with a b-final-winning time of 19.15 seconds, and placed sixteenth overall in the 100 yard freestyle with a time of 42.63 seconds in the b-final.

==== 2019 Pan American Games ====
2019 Pan American Games
Silver medal – second place	4x100 m freestyle	3:14.94
Silver medal – second place	4x200 m freestyle	7:14.82
Bronze medal – third place	200 m freestyle	1:47.71

At the 2019 Pan American Games in Lima, Peru, Kibler won three medals. In the 4×100 meter freestyle relay on August 6, Kibler won the silver medal with his relay teammates Michael Chadwick, Grant House, and Nathan Adrian with a final time of 3:14.94. On August 7, Kibler finished third in the final of the 200 meter freestyle with a time of 1:47.71 and won the bronze medal in the event. Two days later on August 9, Kibler won his third medal, a second silver medal, in the 4×200 meter freestyle relay with relay teammates Grant House, Christopher Wieser, and Samuel Pomajevich who together swam a final relay time of 7:14.82.

=== 2021 ===
==== 2021 NCAA Championships ====
2021 NCAA Championships
Gold medal – first place	4×200 yd freestyle	6:07.25
Silver medal – second place	200 yd freestyle	1:30.39
Silver medal – second place	100 yd freestyle	41.59

At the 2021 NCAA Championships in Greensboro, North Carolina, Kibler swam a 41.45 in the prelims heats of the 100 yard freestyle, advancing to the final ranking second. In the final of the 100 yard freestyle, he tied for second-place. Later in the same finals session, he anchored the 4×100 yard freestyle relay to a fourth-place finish in 2:48.28, splitting a 41.63. One day earlier, he placed second in the final of the 200 yard freestyle with a personal best time of 1:30.39, finishing less than three-tenths of a second behind first-place finisher Kieran Smith. The day before that, he achieved a fifth-place finish in the 500 yard freestyle. One day earlier, and the first day of competition, he helped win the 4×200 yard freestyle relay in 6:07.25, leading-off the relay with a 1:30.65 on the opening leg.

==== 2020 US Olympic Trials ====
Kibler qualified for the 2020 Olympic Games in the 4x200 meter freestyle relay by placing third in the 200 meter freestyle final with a time of 1:45.92 at the 2020 US Olympic Trials in Omaha, Nebraska. In the prelims heats of the 100 meter freestyle, he swam a 48.72 to qualify for the semifinals ranking tenth. For the semifinals, he swam a 49.02, placing 14th and not qualifying for the final. In his third event, the 100 meter butterfly, he placed 23rd in the prelims heats with a time of 53.10 seconds. On the final day of competition, he decided not to swim the 50 meter freestyle.

==== 2020 Summer Olympics ====
In the prelims heats of the 4×200 meter freestyle relay at the 2020 Summer Olympics in Tokyo, Japan, Kibler swam with relay teammates Patrick Callan, Blake Pieroni, and Andrew Seliskar to finish fifth overall and advance the relay to the final. Following his performance in the prelims, he was selected to swim on the relay in the final along with Zach Apple, Kieran Smith, and Townley Haas, which made him the only relay member to swim in both the prelims and final of the event. In the final of the event, Kibler helped the relay finish fourth overall. With his competition at the 2020 Olympic Games, he became the first Olympic swimmer representing the United States from Carmel, Indiana.

=== 2022 ===
Heading into championships season his senior year competing collegiately for the Texas Longhorns under Hall of Fame Coach Eddie Reese, Kibler won the 200 yard freestyle in a new pool record time of 1:32.74 at the Robson and Lindley Aquatics Center and Barr-McMillion Natatorium in a dual meet against Southern Methodist University.

==== 2022 Big 12 Championships ====
At the 2022 Big 12 Conference Championships in February 2022, Kibler led-off the 4×200 yard freestyle relay with a 1:32.20, helping win the event with a final time of 6:08.76 that set a new Championships record. For the 50 yard freestyle prelims heats on day two, he swam a time of 19.33 seconds to qualify for the evening final ranked third. He placed third in the final with a time of 19.48 seconds, finishing 0.31 seconds after the first-place finisher. On the third day, Kibler ranked first in the prelims heats of the 200 yard freestyle, swimming a time of 1:32.88. He won the final with a 1:32.64, finishing 0.28 seconds ahead of the second-place finisher. He also led-off the 4×50 yard freestyle relay in 19.42 seconds later in the same session, however the relay was disqualified when the second swimmer registered a negative reaction time for their start. In the morning on the fourth and final day of competition, he ranked third in the prelims heats of the 100 yard freestyle with a 42.69. Finishing in 42.38 seconds in the final, Kibler placed third behind two of his University of Texas teammates. Concluding the Championships, he helped the University of Texas 4×100 yard freestyle relay win in a Championships record time of 2:47.59, swimming a 41.80 for the second 100-yard portion of the relay.

==== 2022 NCAA Championships ====
2022 NCAA Championships
Gold medal – first place	4×200 yd freestyle	6:03.89 (NR, CR)
Gold medal – first place	200 yd freestyle	1:30.28
Gold medal – first place	4×100 yd freestyle	2:46.03
Bronze medal – third place	4×50 yd freestyle	1:14.41

On day one of the 2022 NCAA Championships, Kibler helped break the American, US Open, and NCAA records he helped set in 2019 in the 4×200 yard freestyle relay, lowering his split time from the former records by over 1.50 seconds to a 1:30.54 to help win the event in 6:03.89. In the morning prelims heats on the second day, he qualified for the final of the 50 yard freestyle tied in rank for second with a personal best time of 18.60 seconds. Swimming a 18.87 in the final, he placed sixth overall, finishing 0.31 seconds behind first-place finisher Brooks Curry. For his second event of the evening, Kibler led-off the 4×50 yard freestyle relay in 18.83 seconds to help achieve a third-place finish in 1:14.41. The third day of competition, he ranked first in the prelims heats of the 200 yard freestyle, qualifying for the final with a time of 1:30.91. In the final, he swam a personal best time of 1:30.28 to win the NCAA title and break the pool record of 1:30.46 set by Townley Haas in 2016, finishing 0.44 seconds ahead of third-place finisher and freshman Matthew Sates. His win made him the first swimmer from Carmel to win an individual NCAA title in swimming.

Equalling his personal best time of 41.45 seconds in the preliminary heats of the 100 yard freestyle on day four, Kibler qualified for the final ranking fifth. In the final of the event, he achieved a personal best time of 41.33 seconds and placed sixth, which was 0.24 seconds off of the podium third-place finish time of 41.09 by Andrey Minakov. In his final event of the Championships, he led-off the 4×100 yard freestyle relay in 41.58 to a help achieve the NCAA title with a final time of 2:46.03.

==== Pro Swim Series – San Antonio ====
Less than a week after the 2022 NCAA Championships, Kibler started off with a 1:49.67 in the prelims heats of the 200 meter freestyle on day two of the 2022 Pro Swim Series held in San Antonio, Texas at Northside Swim Center, qualifying for the final ranking second. He won the 200 meter freestyle in the final with a time of 1:47.61. The following day, he qualified for the final of the 50 meter freestyle ranking fourth with a time of 22.49 seconds in the prelims heats. In the final, he placed fourth with a personal best time of 22.27 seconds, finishing 0.54 seconds behind first-place finisher Michael Andrew. Starting of the final day of competition, he swam a 49.46 in the prelims heats of the 100 meter freestyle to qualify for the evening final tied for third in rank with Ryan Held. In the final, he placed fourth in 49.30 seconds, 0.17 seconds behind third-place finisher Ryan Held.

==== 2022 International Team Trials ====
With a personal best time of 48.28 seconds in the preliminary heats of the 100 meter freestyle on day one of the 2022 US International Team Trials in Greensboro, North Carolina in late April, Kibler qualified for the evening final ranking third. In the final, he lowered his personal best time again, dropping an additional three-hundredths of a second to finish with a 48.25 in a tie with Hunter Armstrong for fourth-place. On the second morning, he qualified for the final of the 200 meter freestyle with a time of 1:46.25 and overall rank of second in the prelims heats. In the evening final, he placed second with a personal best time of 1:45.32 and qualified for the 2022 World Aquatics Championships team in the 200 meter freestyle and 4×200 meter freestyle relay. For the prelims heats of the 100 meter butterfly on day three, he ranked ninth and qualified for the b-final in a personal best time of 52.30 seconds. He followed his prelims swim up with a time of 52.39 seconds in the final, placing seventh overall after being bumped up to the a-final. On the fifth and final day, he swam a 22.38 in the prelims heats of the 50 meter freestyle, achieving a rank of twelfth and qualifying for the evening b-final. He decided not to compete in the b-final. His fourth-place finish in the 100 meter freestyle also qualified him for the World Championships team in the 4×100 meter freestyle relay.

==== 2022 World Aquatics Championships ====
2022 World Championships (LC)
Gold medal – first place	4×200 m freestyle	7:00.24
Bronze medal – third place	4×100 m mixed freestyle	3:21.09 (h)

Kibler started his competition at the 2022 World Aquatics Championships with his individual event, the 200 meter freestyle, swimming a 1:46.13 in the preliminaries to qualify for the semifinals ranking fifth. In the evening semifinals, he lowered his time to a 1:45.54 and qualified for the final ranking sixth. For the final, he finished just three-hundredths of a second behind Tom Dean of Great Britain with a personal best time of 1:45.01 to place fourth. In his second and final event, the 4×200 meter freestyle relay, he led-off the finals relay in 1:45.54 to help win the gold medal in a time of 7:00.24. He won his second medal of the World Championships in the 4×100 meter mixed freestyle relay, splitting a time of 48.26 seconds as part of the prelims relay and helping qualify the relay to the final ranking first before winning a bronze medal for his efforts when the finals relay, on which Brooks Curry substituted in for him, finished third in 3:21.09.

==== 2022 Swimming World Cup ====
Competing at his first FINA Swimming World Cup in Toronto, Canada in October at part of the 2022 FINA Swimming World Cup, Kibler advanced to the final of the 50 meter freestyle on the first day with a personal best time of 21.62 seconds that ranked him sixth across all of the preliminary heats. He slowed it down to a 21.74 in the final, placing eighth. The following morning, he tied Kobe Ndebele of South Africa for eighteenth-place in the preliminary heats of the 100 meter freestyle with a personal best time of 48.08 seconds, not qualifying for the final. On the morning of the third and final day, he ranked third in the preliminary heats of the 200 meter freestyle with a personal best time of 1:43.78, qualifying for the final. He lowered his personal best time by two-hundredths of a second in the final, placing seventh with a 1:43.76.

At his second-ever Swimming World Cup stop, the one held in November 2022 in Indianapolis, Kibler started off with a personal best time of 3:43.68 in the preliminary heats of the 400 meter freestyle, qualifying for the final ranking fourth. He lowered his personal best time by 3.60 seconds in the final, placing fourth with a 3:40.08. The next morning, he improved upon his personal best time in the 100 meter freestyle from Toronto, swimming a 46.84 and qualifying for the final ranking second. He trimmed another two-hundredths of a second off his personal best time in the final, winning his first medal of the circuit, a bronze medal, with a time of 46.82 seconds that was 1.27 seconds behind gold medalist Kyle Chalmers of Australia and 0.55 seconds behind silver medalist Thomas Ceccon of Italy. The third morning, he lowered his personal best time in the 200 meter freestyle with a 1:43.14 in the preliminary heats and an overall second-rank, which qualified him for the final. He finished third in the final, less than two-tenths of a second behind gold medalist and fellow American Kieran Smith, winning the bronze medal with a personal best time of 1:41.93.

==== 2022 World Short Course Championships ====
2022 World Championships (SC)
Gold medal – first place	4×200 m freestyle	6:44.12 (WR)
Bronze medal – third place	4×100 m freestyle	3:05.09

For the 2022 World Short Course Championships, in mid-December in Melbourne, Australia, Kibler was named to his first World Short Course Championships roster, with a spot in each the 100 meter freestyle and the 200 meter freestyle. Day one of competition, he achieved the fastest split time amongst the American prelims relay swimmers in the 4×100 meter freestyle relay with a 45.91 for the second leg, helping qualify the relay to the final ranking third. He won his first medal at a World Short Course Championships in the final, leading-off the relay with a 46.84 to help win the bronze medal in 3:05.09. The following morning, he placed seventeenth in the 100 meter freestyle with a time of 47.05 seconds.

Swimming under 21 seconds for the second leg of the 4×50 meter freestyle relay in the preliminaries on day three, Kibler helped qualify the relay to the final ranking second with a 1:24.07. Increasing his time to a 21.10 for the anchor leg of the relay in the final, he contributed to a final mark of 1:24.03 and overall fifth-place. Starting off fresh on day four, he anchored the 4×200 meter freestyle relay with a 1:41.97 in the preliminaries to help qualify the relay to the final ranking first in 6:53.63. On the finals relay, he lowered his anchor split time to a 1:41.16, helping win the gold medal in a world record-setting time of 6:44.12. In the preliminaries of the 200 metre freestyle, his second of two individual events, on day six of six, he qualified for the final ranking fourth with a personal best time of 1:41.88. In the second senior World Championships final of his career in an individual event, following the final of the 200 meter freestyle at the long course 2022 World Aquatics Championship, he placed fourth again, same as at the 2022 long course World Championships, this time with a personal best of 1:41.44, which was 1.72 seconds behind gold medalist Hwang Sun-woo of South Korea.

=== 2023 ===
In March 2023, at the long course meters Speedo Sections in Indianapolis, Kibler won the 50 meter freestyle on day one with a personal best time of 22.23 seconds, the 200 meter freestyle on day two with a 1:45.82, the 400 meter freestyle on day three with a personal best time of 3:52.25, and the 100 meter freestyle on day four with a 48.89.

== International championships (50 m) ==
Meet	50 free	100 free	200 free	400 free	100 back	100 fly	4×100 free	4×200 free	4×100 medley	4×100 mixed free
Junior level
PACJ 2016	1st (b)	2nd (b)	3rd place, bronze medalist(s)	19th			1st place, gold medalist(s)	2nd place, silver medalist(s)		—N/a
WJC 2017					4th	15th	4th	(silver) ^{[a]}	DSQ	
PACJ 2018	2nd place, silver medalist(s)	1st place, gold medalist(s)	1st place, gold medalist(s)			2nd (b)	1st place, gold medalist(s)	1st place, gold medalist(s)	1st place, gold medalist(s)	—N/a
Senior level
PAN 2019			3rd place, bronze medalist(s)				2nd place, silver medalist(s)	2nd place, silver medalist(s)		
OG 2020								4th		—N/a
WC 2022			4th					1st place, gold medalist(s)		(bronze) ^{[a]}

^{a} Kibler swam only in the prelims heats.

== International championships (25 m) ==
Meet	100 freestyle	200 freestyle	4×50 freestyle	4×100 freestyle	4×200 freestyle
WC 2022	17th	4th	5th	3rd place, bronze medalist(s)	1st place, gold medalist(s)

== Personal best times ==
=== Long course meters (50 m pool) ===
Event	Time		Meet	Date	Location	Ref
50 m freestyle	22.23		2023 Speedo Sectionals – Indianapolis	March 23, 2023	Indianapolis, Indiana	
100 m freestyle	48.25		2022 US International Team Trials	April 26, 2022	Greensboro, North Carolina	
200 m freestyle	1:45.01		2022 World Aquatics Championships	June 20, 2022	Budapest, Hungary	
400 m freestyle	3:52.25		2023 Speedo Sectionals – Indianapolis	March 25, 2023	Indianapolis, Indiana	
100 m butterfly	52.30	h	2022 US International Team Trials	April 28, 2022	Greensboro, North Carolina	

Legend: h — preliminary heat

=== Short course meters (25 m pool) ===
Event	Time		Meet	Location	Date	Ref
50 m freestyle	21.62	h	2022 Swimming World Cup	Toronto, Canada	October 28, 2022	
100 m freestyle	46.82		2022 Swimming World Cup	Indianapolis, Indiana	November 4, 2022	
200 m freestyle	1:41.44		2022 World Short Course Championships	Melbourne, Australia	December 18, 2022	
400 m freestyle	3:40.08		2022 Swimming World Cup	Indianapolis, Indiana	November 3, 2022	

Legend: h – preliminary heat

=== Short course yards (25 yd pool) ===
Event	Time		Meet	Date	Location	Ref
50 yd freestyle	18.60	h	2022 NCAA Championships	March 24, 2022	Atlanta, Georgia	
100 yd freestyle	41.33		2022 NCAA Championships	March 26, 2022	Atlanta, Georgia	
200 yd freestyle	1:30.28		2022 NCAA Championships	March 25, 2022	Atlanta, Georgia	

Legend: h — preliminary heat

== Swimming World Cup circuits ==
The following medals Kibler has won at Swimming World Cup circuits.

Edition	Gold medals	Silver medals	Bronze medals	Total
2022	0	0	2	2
Total	0	0	2	2

== World records ==
=== Short course meters (25 m pool) ===
No.	Event	Time	Meet	Date	Location	Status	Ref
1	4×200 m freestyle	6:44.12	2022 World Short Course Championships	December 16, 2022	Melbourne, Australia	Current	

== Continental and national records ==
=== Short course meters (25 m pool) ===
No.	Event	Time	Meet	Date	Location	Type	Status	Notes	Ref
1	4×200 m freestyle	6:44.12	2022 World Short Course Championships	December 16, 2022	Melbourne, Australia	AM, NR, ACR	Current	WR	

Legend: WR – World record; AM – Americas record; NR – American record; ACR – Australian All Comers record;
Records not set in finals: h – heat; sf – semifinal; r – relay 1st leg; rh – relay heat 1st leg; b – B final; † – en route to final mark; so – swim-off; tt – time trial

=== Short course yards (25 yd pool) ===
No.	Event	Time	Meet	Date	Location	Type	Status	Ref
1	4×200 yd freestyle	6:05.08	2019 NCAA Championships	March 27, 2019	Austin, Texas	NR, US	Former	
2	4×200 yd freestyle (2)	6:03.89	2022 NCAA Championships	March 23, 2022	Atlanta, Georgia	NR, US	Former	

Legend: NR – American record; US – U.S. Open record;
Records not set in finals: h – heat; sf – semifinal; r – relay 1st leg; rh – relay heat 1st leg; b – B final; † – en route to final mark; so – swim-off; tt – time trial

== Awards and honors ==
- SwimSwam, Top 100 (Men's): 2022 (#98)

== See also ==
- NCAA Division I Men's Swimming and Diving Championships
- Texas Longhorns swimming and diving
- Texas Longhorns
