= Brooks Curry =

American swimmer (born 2001)

Personal information
- Nationality: United States
- Born: January 22, 2001 (age 25) Dunwoody, Georgia, U.S.
- Height: 6 ft 3 in (191 cm)

Sport
- Sport: Swimming
- Strokes: Freestyle
- Club: Dynamo Swim Club
- College team: Louisiana State University
Medal record
Men's swimming
Representing the United States
Olympic Games
| Gold medal – first place | 2020 Tokyo | 4×100 m freestyle |
| Silver medal – second place | 2024 Paris | 4x200 m freestyle |
World Championships (LC)
| Gold medal – first place | 2022 Budapest | 4×100 m freestyle |
| Silver medal – second place | 2022 Budapest | 4×100 m medley |
| Bronze medal – third place | 2022 Budapest | 4×100 m mixed freestyle |
Pan American Games
| Silver medal – second place | 2023 Santiago | 100 m freestyle |
| Silver medal – second place | 2023 Santiago | 4×100 m freestyle |
| Silver medal – second place | 2023 Santiago | 4×200 m freestyle |

Brooks Vaughn Curry (born January 22, 2001) is an American competitive swimmer. He is an Olympian and a gold medalist in the 4×100-meter freestyle relay at the 2020 Summer Olympics. At the 2022 NCAA Championships, he won the NCAA title in the 50-yard freestyle and 100-yard freestyle. At the 2022 World Aquatics Championships, he won a gold medal in the 4×100-meter freestyle relay, swimming the anchor leg of the relay in both the prelims and the final, a bronze medal in the 4×100-meter mixed freestyle relay, swimming in the final, and placed fifth in the 100-meter freestyle.

== Background ==
Curry currently attends and swims collegiately in NCAA competition for Louisiana State University. He started competing for the school's swim team, the LSU Tigers, in the fall of 2019.

== 2021: Relay international debut ==
=== Collegiate championships ===
At the 2021 Southeastern Conference, SEC, Championships in Columbia, Missouri in February, Curry was one of three athletes to swim the 50-yard freestyle in less than 19 seconds in the prelims heats, finishing in a personal best time of 18.97 seconds. The following month, at the 2021 NCAA Division I Men's Swimming and Diving Championships in Greensboro, North Carolina, he placed seventh in the final of the 100-yard freestyle with a time of 41.99 seconds after swimming a personal best time of 41.77 seconds in the prelims heats.

=== 2020 US Olympic Trials ===
Curry qualified for the 2020 Olympic Games in the 4×100-meter freestyle relay, placing fourth at the 2020 US Olympic Team Trials with a time of 48.19 seconds. In addition to competing in the 100-meter freestyle at the year's Olympic Trials, he also competed in the 50-meter freestyle where he tied for ninth place overall with a personal best time of 22.08 seconds in the semifinals. His time in the 100-meter freestyle was fast enough for him to make the 2021—2022 US National Team roster in the event.

=== 2020 Summer Olympics ===
2020 Summer Olympics
| Gold medal – first place | 4×100 m freestyle | 3:08.97 (h) |

At the 2020 Summer Olympics in Tokyo, Japan, Curry raced for the U.S. Olympic swim team in the preliminary heats of the 4×100-meter freestyle relay alongside Zach Apple, Bowe Becker, and Blake Pieroni. In the final, Caeleb Dressel was substituted in his place and the relay won the gold medal. Curry was the first swimmer from the Louisiana State University athletics program, called the LSU Tigers, to win a gold medal at an Olympic Games in swimming. He was also the first swimmer from the program since the 2000 Summer Olympics to compete in the 4×100-meter freestyle relay at an Olympic Games. After the medals were handed out at the medal ceremony, Dressel tossed his gold medal to Curry, who was watching from the stands, as a demonstration of his gratitude for Curry's contribution to the victory. While Curry's performance on the prelims relay and involvement in the finals relay's medal ceremony hit a certain sentimental note with the American press, they did not warrant him being included in the relay's nomination from the USA Swimming Foundation for their 2021 Golden Goggle Award for "Relay Performance of the Year" as only the finals relay swimmers received that honor.

=== Collegiate season beginnings ===
Once the collegiate season started up again following the 2020 Olympic Games, Curry swam a 19.51 in the 50-yard freestyle for his team, the LSU Tigers, in a dual meet against the Grand Canyon Antelopes on October 9, setting a new pool record for the LSU Natatorium and helping his team win the meet. His win contributed to the LSU Tigers and Lady Tigers winning a total of 23 swimming events in the dual meet. A little under two weeks later on October 21, Curry swam an unofficial personal best time of approximately 18.65 seconds, plus or minus five hundredths of a second, during practice. One day later, on October 22, Curry won the 50-yard freestyle for his school with a time of 19.59 seconds at the Rocky Mountain Invitational in which LSU competed against three other collegiate teams. The next day of the invitational, Curry won the 100-yard freestyle with a time of 43.91 seconds. In addition to his two individual events, Curry also swam on the first-place finishing 4×50-yard medley relay, splitting 19.16 for the freestyle leg, the second-place finishing 4×100-yard freestyle relay, splitting a 42.89 for the third leg of the rely, the first-place finishing 4×100-yard medley relay, swimming a 43.73 for the anchoring leg of the relay, and the second-place finishing 4×50-yard freestyle relay, splitting a 19.89 for the lead-off leg of the relay. His performances helped his school win each of the three dual meets taking place as part of the two-day Rocky Mountain Invitational where his team competed against the Denver Pioneers, Wyoming Cowboys and Cowgirls, and Air Force Falcons.

In a dual meet against the Alabama Crimson Tide in early November, Curry won all three of his individual events for LSU, swimming a 19.95 in the 50-yard freestyle, 43.98 in the 100-yard freestyle, and 1:34.27 in the 200-yard freestyle. On November 17, the first day of the 2021 Art Adamson Invitational, Curry lowered his official personal best time for the season in the 50-yard freestyle in the prelims with a swim of 19.14 seconds. In the final later the same day, Curry cut 0.05 seconds off his time from the prelims to win the event in 19.09 seconds. In the 100-yard backstroke on November 18, Curry dropped 1.62 seconds from his previous best time of 48.66 seconds by swimming a 47.04 in the prelims. The third and final day of the Invitational, Curry swam a season best time of 42.86 seconds in the prelims of the 100-yard freestyle. In the final of the 100-yard freestyle in the evening, Curry won the event with a new season best time of 42.30 seconds.

== 2022: Individual international debut ==
Starting off 2022 in advance of the collegiate championships season, Curry nudged out Dean Farris of Harvard University in a virtual duel of a 75-yard freestyle sprint with fins, swimming the distance in 28.6 seconds to Dean Farris's 28.7 seconds. In a dual meet against Texas A&M University at the LSU Natatorium, Curry broke his own pool record in the 50-yard freestyle with a times of 19.42 seconds.

=== 2022 Southeastern Conference Championships ===
At the 2022 Southeastern Conference Championships in February 2022, Curry helped achieve a sixth-place finish in the 4×50-yard medley relay, splitting a 18.14 for the freestyle leg of the relay. With his split, Curry registered as the ninth-fastest 50-yard freestyle split performer in NCAA history, just 0.28 seconds slower than the first person to achieve a time faster than 18.00 seconds, Vladimir Morozov who swam a 17.86 in 2013. The next day, he swam a personal best time of 18.93 seconds in the 50-yard freestyle prelims heats to qualify for the final ranking second. In the evening finals session, Curry started his competition in the 4×50-yard freestyle relay, swimming a 18.50 and helping place eighth. For the 50-yard freestyle final, Curry placed second in a personal best time of 18.67 seconds. Day three, he ranked fifth in the prelims heats of the 200-yard freestyle, advancing to the final with his time of 1:33.49. In the final, he swam faster than the pool record of 1:31.65 set in 2013 though did not set a new record as he finished in second-place behind Matthew Sates who swam a 1:31.16, which was just under a quarter of a second faster than Curry's 1:31.39. In the 4×100-yard medley relay on day four, Curry swam the only freestyle split faster than 41.60 seconds with a 40.93, helping finish in seventh-place at 3:07.31. For the 100-yard freestyle prelims heats on the fifth and final morning, Curry qualified for the final ranking first with a time of 41.82 seconds. In the final he swam a 40.99, winning the event and breaking the Championships record of 41.07 seconds set by Caeleb Dressel in 2016 as well as the pool record of 41.24 seconds set by Caeleb Dressel in 2017. Curry followed up his individual win with a sixth-place finish in the 4×100-yard freestyle relay, splitting a 41.42 for the lead-off leg of the relay to help achieve a time of 2:52.07.

=== 2022 NCAA Championships ===
2022 NCAA Championships
| Gold medal – first place | 50 yd freestyle | 18.56 |
| Gold medal – first place | 100 yd freestyle | 40.84 |

In his first event of the 2022 NCAA Division I Championships, the 50-yard freestyle on day two, Curry tied in rank for sixth in the morning prelims heats with a time of 18.85 seconds and qualified for the final later in the day. He won the event in the final with a personal best time of 18.56 seconds and a winning margin of 0.48 seconds ahead of seventh-place finisher Youssef Ramadan. With his win, Curry became the third male swimmer in the history of the LSU swimming and diving program to win a title at an NCAA Championships and the first since Mark Andrews in 1988 to win a title in the 50-yard freestyle. The following morning, he qualified for the final of the 200-yard freestyle ranking eighth with his time of 1:32.00 from the prelims heats. He lowered his time to a 1:31.45 in the final to place sixth, finishing 1.17 seconds behind first-place finisher Drew Kibler. For his third and final individual event, the 100-yard freestyle on day four, he advanced to the final from the preliminary heats where he swam a 41.19 to rank third overall. In the final of the 100-yard freestyle, he won the NCAA title with a personal best time of 40.84 seconds, touching the wall one quarter of a second ahead of third-place finisher Andrey Minakov. His two individual titles brought the total number of NCAA titles won by swimmers and divers in LSU program history from two to four and all three of his performances contributed to the highest team finish at a men's NCAA Swimming and Diving Championships since 1997.

=== 2022 International Team Trials ===
At the 2022 US International Team Trials in Greensboro, North Carolina in April, Curry ranked fourth in the preliminary heats of the 100-meter freestyle on day one, qualifying for the final with his time of 48.36 seconds. In the final, he placed second with a personal best time of 48.04 seconds, finishing less than three-tenths of a second behind the first-place finisher, and qualifying for the 2022 World Aquatics Championships team in the 100-meter freestyle, 4×100-meter freestyle relay, and 4×100-meter medley relay. On the fifth and final day, he swam a personal best time of 21.91 seconds in the prelims heats of the 50-meter freestyle, qualifying for the final ranking third. He lowered his personal best time to a 21.84 in the final, placing third.

=== 2022 World Aquatics Championships ===
2022 World Championships
| Gold medal – first place | 4×100 m freestyle | 3:09.34 |
| Silver medal – second place | 4×100 m medley | 3:27.79 (h) |
| Bronze medal – third place | 4×100 m mixed freestyle | 3:21.09 |

For his first event of the 2022 World Aquatics Championships, the 4×100-meter freestyle relay, Curry swam a 47.76 for the anchor leg of the relay to help qualify it for the final ranking first. In the final, he split a time of 47.20 seconds for the anchor leg to bring the relay home in a final time of 3:09.34 and win the gold medal in the event, he swam the second-fastest split time on the finals relay team, only slower than Ryan Held who split a 46.99. Three days later, he swam a 48.38 in the preliminaries of the 100-meter freestyle, qualifying for the semifinals ranking tenth overall. In the evening semifinals of the event, he qualified for the final with a personal best time of 47.90 seconds and overall rank of seventh. He placed fifth in the final with a time of 48.00 seconds, finishing 0.29 seconds behind bronze medalist Joshua Liendo of Canada. Two days later, he helped win the bronze medal and achieve a finals relay time of 3:21.09 in the 4×100-meter mixed freestyle relay, splitting a time of 47.72 seconds for the second leg of the relay in the final. The final day of competition, he split a 48.29 for the freestyle leg of the 4×100-meter medley relay, helping qualify the relay to the final with a time of 3:32.91 and overall first rank. On the finals relay, Ryan Held substituted in for him and all relay members won a silver medal when the finals relay finished second in 3:27.79.

=== Collegiate season beginnings ===
At the Louisiana State University dual meet against the South Carolina Gamecocks in early October, Curry won the 50-yard freestyle with a time of 19.45 seconds and the 100-yard freestyle with a time of 43.25 seconds, contributing to an overall win for his team. The following weekend, he helped win two dual meets in a triple-team format, against the Denver Pioneers and Air Force Falcons, placing second in the 200-yard freestyle with a 1:37.17 and winning the 100-yard freestyle with a 43.36 for his individual events.

On October 28, Curry swam a personal best time of 21.35 seconds in the preliminary heats of the 50-meter freestyle at his first FINA Swimming World Cup, the 2022 FINA Swimming World Cup conducted in short course meters in Toronto, Canada, and qualified for the final tied for third rank. In the evening final, he finished 0.16 seconds behind gold medalist Dylan Carter of Trinidad and Tobago and 0.03 seconds ahead of bronze medalist Kyle Chalmers of Australia to win the silver medal in a personal best time of 21.07 seconds. For the 100-meter freestyle preliminary heats in the morning on day two, he achieved a personal best time of 47.05 seconds and qualified for the final ranking second. He finished in a personal best time of 46.32 seconds in the final to win the bronze medal, not far ahead of fourth-place finisher Dylan Carter, who finished in 46.36 seconds, and a slim 0.17 seconds behind silver medalist Thomas Ceccon of Italy. The third and final day in Toronto, he qualified for the final of the 200-meter freestyle ranking sixth with a personal best time of 1:44.45 in the preliminary heats. In the final later in the day, he won the gold medal in the 200-meter freestyle with a personal best time of 1:42.32.

The Friday following the World Cup in Toronto, Curry was back on-campus competing at the LSU Natatorium for a dual meet against the Alabama Crimson Tide, winning the 50-yard freestyle with a 19.60, the 100-yard freestyle with a time of 43.56 seconds and the 200-yard freestyle with a pool record time of 1:35.41 to help achieve a final score less than 20 points behind the Crimson Tide. Twelve days later, he won the 50-yard freestyle at the 2022 Art Adamson Invitational, in Texas, with a time of 18.94 seconds. Day two of the Invitational, he placed fourth in the 200-yard freestyle with a 1:33.56. The third and final day of swimming competition, he won the 100-yard freestyle with an NCAA season-leading time of 41.86 seconds.

== 2023 ==
On January 7, 2023, Curry won the 50-yard freestyle with a 19.57, the 100-yard freestyle with a time of 43.61 seconds, and helped set a pool record in the 4×100-yard freestyle relay with a 2:54.76 at the LSU Natatorium in a dual meet against the Florida State Seminoles, where the men's team lost by 60 points. In the final dual meet of the season two weeks later, against the Texas A&M Aggies, he improved upon his times in both of his individual events, winning the 50-yard freestyle with a 19.54 and the 100-yard freestyle with a 43.43.

=== 2023 Southeastern Conference Championships ===
Curry contributed a time of 18.34 seconds for the freestyle leg of the 4×50-yard medley relay on day one of the 2023 Southeastern Conference Championships in February, though the LSU relay team was disqualified for an early start by the breaststroke swimmer. The following day, his split time of 18.56 seconds for the second leg of the 4×50-yard freestyle relay, helped achieve a time of 1:17.86 and overall placing of ninth. Later in the same session, he placed sixth in the 50-yard freestyle with a time of 18.99 seconds, which was 1.06 seconds behind first-place finisher Jordan Crooks of the Tennessee Volunteers. With a time of 1:33.15 in the final of the 200-yard freestyle on the third evening, he placed fifth. It marked his fastest time in the NCAA season for the 200-yard freestyle. In his third relay event, and fifth event overall, he helped place sixth in the 4×100-yard medley relay with a time of 3:07.02 in the final on day four. Concluding his individual events with the 100-yard freestyle on day five of five, he placed fifth with a time of 41.88 seconds. For the 4×100-yard freestyle relay, he helped place eighth with a final time of 2:52.23.

=== 2023 NCAA Championships ===
Day two of the 2023 NCAA Division I Championships, held in Minneapolis in March, Curry placed fourth in the 50-yard freestyle in a time of 18.76 seconds, finishing 0.09 seconds behind bronze medalist Björn Seeliger of the California Golden Bears. The third day, he went out in a 1:31.94 in the preliminaries of the 200-yard freestyle, qualified for the final, and improved upon his placing from sixth at the 2022 NCAA Division I Championships to fourth in the final with a personal best time of 1:31.30, which set a new men's LSU Tigers swim program record in the event. For his third and final event, the 100-yard freestyle on day four, he placed fifth in the evening finals session with a time of 41.03 seconds.

== International championships (50 m) ==
| Meet | 100 freestyle | 4×100 freestyle relay | 4×100 medley relay | 4×100 mixed freestyle relay |
|---|---|---|---|---|
| OG 2020 | | (gold) ^{[a]} | | —N/a |
| WC 2022 | 5th | 1st place, gold medalist(s) | (silver) ^{[a]} | 3rd place, bronze medalist(s) |

^{a} Curry swam only in the prelims heats.

== Personal best times ==
=== Long course meters (50 m pool) ===
As of June 21, 2022

| Event | Time | | Meet | Location | Date | Ref |
|---|---|---|---|---|---|---|
| 50 m freestyle | 21.84 | | 2022 US International Team Trials | Greensboro, North Carolina | April 30, 2022 | |
| 100 m freestyle | 47.90 | sf | 2022 World Aquatics Championships | Budapest, Hungary | June 21, 2022 | |

Legend: sf — semifinal

=== Short course meters (25 m pool) ===
As of October 30, 2022

| Event | Time | Meet | Location | Date | Ref |
|---|---|---|---|---|---|
| 50 m freestyle | 21.07 | 2022 Swimming World Cup | Toronto, Canada | October 28, 2022 | |
| 100 m freestyle | 46.32 | 2022 Swimming World Cup | Toronto, Canada | October 29, 2022 | |
| 200 m freestyle | 1:42.32 | 2022 Swimming World Cup | Toronto, Canada | October 30, 2022 | |

=== Short course yards (25 yd pool) ===
As of March 28, 2023

| Event | Time | | Meet | Location | Date | Ref |
|---|---|---|---|---|---|---|
| 50 yd freestyle | 18.56 | | 2022 NCAA Division I Championships | Atlanta, Georgia | March 24, 2022 | |
| 100 yd freestyle | 40.84 | | 2022 NCAA Division I Championships | Atlanta, Georgia | March 26, 2022 | |
| 200 yd freestyle | 1:31.30 | | 2023 NCAA Division I Championships | Minneapolis, Minnesota | March 24, 2023 | |
| 100 yd backstroke | 47.04 | h | 2021 Art Adamson Invitational | College Station, Texas | November 18, 2021 | |

Legend: h — preliminary heat

== Swimming World Cup circuits ==
The following medals Curry has won at Swimming World Cup circuits.

| Edition | Gold medals | Silver medals | Bronze medals | Total |
|---|---|---|---|---|
| 2022 | 1 | 1 | 1 | 3 |
| Total | 1 | 1 | 1 | 3 |

== Records ==
=== Pool records (short course yards) ===
| No. | Event | Time | Meet | Location | Site (Pool) | Date | Age | Ref |
|---|---|---|---|---|---|---|---|---|
| 1 | 50 yd freestyle | 19.51 | LSU vs. Grand Canyon Dual Meet | Baton Rouge, Louisiana | LSU Natatorium | October 9, 2021 | 20 | |
| 2 | 50 yd freestyle | 19.42 | LSU vs. Texas A&M Dual Meet | Baton Rouge, Louisiana | LSU Natatorium | January 22, 2022 | 21 | |
| 3 | 100 yd freestyle | 40.99 | 2022 Southeastern Conference Championships | Knoxville, Tennessee | Jones Aquatic Center | February 19, 2022 | 21 | |
| 4 | 200 yd freestyle | 1:35.41 | LSU vs. University of Alabama Dual Meet | Baton Rouge, Louisiana | LSU Natatorium | November 4, 2022 | 21 | |
| 5 | 4×100 yd freestyle | 2:54.76 | LSU vs. Florida State University Dual Meet | Baton Rouge, Louisiana | LSU Natatorium | January 7, 2023 | 21 | |

== Awards and honors ==
- Southeastern Conference (SEC), Swimmer of the Year (male): 2021–2022
- Southeastern Conference (SEC), Academic Honor Roll: Winter 2021–2022
- Southeastern Conference (SEC), Freshman Swimmer of the Year (male): 2019–2020
- Southeastern Conference (SEC), Swimmer of the Week (male): January 25, 2022, October 11, 2022
- Louisiana State University, Mikey Award, Male Sport Play of the Year: 2022
- Louisiana State University, CCACSA Student-Athlete of the Month: February 2023
- SwimSwam, Swammy Award honorable mention, NCAA Championships Swimmer of the Meet (Men's): 2022
