= 2018 USA Swimming Championships =

American swimming tournament

The 2018 Phillips 66 National Swimming Championships were held from July 25 to 29, 2018, at the William Woollett Jr. Aquatics Center in Irvine, California.

== Men's events ==
Event	Gold		Silver		Bronze	
50 m freestyle	Michael Andrew	21.49	Caeleb Dressel	21.67	Nathan Adrian	21.85
100 m freestyle	Blake Pieroni	48.08	Nathan Adrian	48.25	Townley Haas	48.30
200 m freestyle	Andrew Seliskar	1:45.70	Blake Pieroni	1:45.93	Conor Dwyer	1:46.08
400 m freestyle	Zane Grothe	3:46.53	Grant Shoults	3:46.90	Chris Wieser	3:48.92
800 m freestyle	Zane Grothe	7:44.57 CR	Jordan Wilimovsky	7:47.51	Robert Finke	7:51.45
1500 m freestyle	Jordan Wilimovsky	14:48.89	Robert Finke	14:55.34	Zane Grothe	15:00.85
50 m backstroke	Ryan Murphy	24.24 AM, CR	Justin Ress	24.31	Ryan Held	24.60
100 m backstroke	Ryan Murphy	52.51	Matt Grevers	52.55	Justin Ress	53.26
200 m backstroke	Ryan Murphy	1:54.15	Jacob Pebley	1:55.68	Austin Katz	1:56.12
50 m breaststroke	Michael Andrew	26.84 CR	Devon Nowicki	27.12	Ian Finnerty	27.19
100 m breaststroke	Michael Andrew	59.38	Andrew Wilson	59.43	Devon Nowicki	59.48
200 m breaststroke	Josh Prenot	2:07.28	Andrew Wilson	2:08.71	Will Licon	2:08.72
50 m butterfly	Michael Andrew	22.93 CR	Caeleb Dressel	22.97	Chatham Dobbs	23.38
100 m butterfly	Caeleb Dressel	50.50	Jack Conger	51.11	Michael Andrew	51.68
200 m butterfly	Justin Wright	1:54.63	Zach Harting	1:55.11	Luca Urlando Jack Conger	1:55.21
200 m IM	Chase Kalisz	1:55.73	Abrahm DeVine	1:57.41	Gunnar Bentz Andrew Seliskar	1:58.23
400 m IM	Chase Kalisz	4:08.25	Jay Litherland	4:10.21	Sean Grieshop	4:12.72

== Women's events ==
Event	Gold		Silver		Bronze	
50 m freestyle	Simone Manuel	24.10 CR	Abbey Weitzeil	24.63	Margo Geer	24.79
100 m freestyle	Simone Manuel	52.54 CR	Mallory Comerford	53.09	Margo Geer	53.44
200 m freestyle	Katie Ledecky	1:54.60	Allison Schmitt	1:55.82	Gabby DeLoof	1:56.55
400 m freestyle	Katie Ledecky	3:59.09	Leah Smith	4:02.21	Haley Anderson	4:07.21
800 m freestyle	Katie Ledecky	8:11.98	Leah Smith	8:22.79	Haley Anderson	8:24.13
1500 m freestyle	Ashley Twichell	15:55.68	Ally McHugh	16:02.56	Erica Sullivan	16:02.88
50 m backstroke	Olivia Smoliga	27.70	Ali DeLoof	27.88	Elise Haan	27.90
100 m backstroke	Kathleen Baker	58.00 WR	Olivia Smoliga	58.75	Regan Smith	58.83 WJR
200 m backstroke	Kathleen Baker Regan Smith	2:06.43 WJR	Not awarded		Isabelle Stadden	2:08.24
50 m breaststroke	Lilly King	29.82	Molly Hannis	30.07	Katie Meili	30.72
100 m breaststroke	Lilly King	1:05.36	Katie Meili	1:06.19	Micah Sumrall	1:06.34
200 m breaststroke	Micah Sumrall	2:22.06	Bethany Galat	2:23.32	Annie Lazor	2:24.42
50 m butterfly	Kelsi Dahlia	25.48 =AM, CR	Kendyl Stewart	25.83	Hellen Moffitt	26.45
100 m butterfly	Kelsi Dahlia	56.83	Katie McLaughlin	57.51	Kendyl Stewart	57.70
200 m butterfly	Hali Flickinger	2:06.14	Katie Drabot	2:07.18	Regan Smith	2:07.42
200 m IM	Kathleen Baker	2:08.32 CR	Melanie Margalis	2:09.43	Ella Eastin	2:10.84
400 m IM	Ally McHugh	4:34.80	Brooke Forde	4:35.09	Melanie Margalis	4:35.50
