= 2019 NCAA Division I Men's Swimming and Diving Championships =

American college aquatic sports competition

2019 NCAA Division I Swimming and Diving Championships
- Host city: Austin, Texas
- Date: March 27–30, 2019
- Venue(s): Lee and Joe Jamail Texas Swimming Center; University of Texas at Austin

The 2019 NCAA Division I Men's Swimming and Diving Championships were contested from March 27–30, 2019 at the Lee and Joe Jamail Texas Swimming Center at University of Texas at Austin in Austin, Texas at the 96th annual NCAA-sanctioned swim meet to determine the team and individual national champions of Division I men's collegiate swimming and diving in the United States.

== Team standings ==
- Note: Top 10 only
- (H) = Hosts
- ^{(DC)} = Defending champions
- Full results

Rank	Team	Points
1st place, gold medalist(s)	California	560
2nd place, silver medalist(s)	Texas ^{(DC)} (H)	475
3rd place, bronze medalist(s)	Indiana	385.5
4	NC State	307
5	Louisville	212
6	Florida	164
7	Alabama	142
8	Harvard	132
9	Ohio State	124
10	Virginia	106

== Swimming results ==
Full results

Event	Gold		Silver		Bronze	
50 freestyle	Ryan Hoffer; California	18.63	Pawel Sendyk; California	18.68	Robert Howard; Alabama	18.80
100 freestyle	Dean Farris; Harvard	40.80	Bowe Becker; Minnesota	40.83	Zach Apple; Indiana	41.45
200 freestyle	Andrew Seliskar; California	1:30.14	Zach Apple; Indiana	1:31.55	Drew Kibler; Texas	1:31.76
500 freestyle	Townley Haas; Texas	4:08.19; NC	Sean Grieshop; California	4:10.29	Brooks Fail; Arizona	4:10.77
1650 freestyle	Felix Auboeck; Michigan	14:23.09	Michael Brinegar; Indiana	14.27.50	Nick Norman; California	14:32.12
100 backstroke	Dean Farris; Harvard	43.66	Coleman Stewart; NC State	43.98	Mark Nikolaev; Grand Canyon	44.33
200 backstroke	John Shebat; Texas	1:36.42	Austin Katz; Texas	1:36.45	Bryce Mefford; California	1:38.65
100 breaststroke	Ian Finnerty; Indiana	49.85	Carsten Vissering; USC	50.30	Max McHugh; Minnesota	50.52
200 breaststroke	Andrew Seliskar; California	1:48.70	Max McHugh; Minnesota	1:49.41	Ian Finnerty; Indiana	1:49.90
100 butterfly	Vini Lanza; Indiana	44.37	Coleman Stewart; NC State	44.46	Miles Smachlo; Michigan	44.84
200 butterfly	Andreas Vazaios; NC State	1:38.57	Vini Lanza; Indiana	1:39.63	Zheng Wen Quah; California	1:39.68
200 IM	Andrew Seliskar; California	1:38.14; MR	Andreas Vazaios; NC State	1:39.35	John Shebat; Texas	1:39.63
400 IM	Abrahm DeVine; Stanford	3:36.41	Sean Grieshop; California	3:37.03	Mike Thomas; California	3:37.52
200 freestyle relay	California; Pawel Sendyk (18.84); Ryan Hoffer (18.43); Michael Jensen (18.79); Andrew Seliskar (18.40)	1:14.46	NC State; Nyls Korstanje (19.03); Justin Ress (18.32); Jacob Molacek (18.81); Giovanni Izzo (18.62)	1:14.56	Texas; Daniel Krueger (19.19); Drew Kibler (18.62); Jake Sannem (18.92); Tate Jackson (18.38)	1:15.11
400 freestyle relay	Texas; Daniel Krueger (41.73); John Shebat (41.65); Tate Jackson (40.98); Townley Haas (40.76)	2:45.12	NC State; Jacob Molacek (41.91); Coleman Stewart (41.94); Nyls Korstanje (41.44); Justin Ress (40.96)	2:46.25	California; Michael Jensen (42.15); Pawel Sendyk (41.92); Ryan Hoffer (41.24); Andrew Seliskar (41.10)	2:46.41
800 freestyle relay	Texas; Drew Kibler (1:32.06); Austin Katz (1:31.45); Jeff Newkirk (1:31.91); Townley Haas (1:29.66)	6:05.08; US, AR	NC State; Andreas Vazaios (1:32.22); Coleman Stewart (1:30.61); Jacob Molacek (1:31.91); Justin Ress (1:31.89)	6:06.63	California; Andrew Seliskar (1:30.14); Bryce Mefford (1:32.57); Trenton Julian (1:31.74); Mike Thomas (1:32.86)	6:07.31
200 medley relay	Alabama; Zane Waddell (20.41); Laurent Bams (23.24); Knox Auerbach (20.39); Robert Howard (18.22)	1:22.26	California; Daniel Carr (20.85); Reece Whitley (23.68); Pawel Sendyk (19.66); Ryan Hoffer (18.17)	1:22.43	NC State; Coleman Stewart (20.66); Daniel Graber (23.49); Nyls Korstanje (20.06); Justin Ress (18.26)	1:22.47
400 medley relay	Indiana; Gabriel Fantoni (45.25); Ian Finnerty (49.60); Vini Lanza (44.21); Zach Apple (40.64)	2:59.70	California; Daniel Carr (45.09); Reece Whitley (51.15); Andrew Seliskar (44.32); Ryan Hoffer (41.00)	3:01.56	Texas; Austin Katz (45.54); Charlie Scheinfeld (50.97); John Shebat (43.89); Tate Jackson (41.18)	3:01.58

Legend: US – U.S. Open record; NC – NCAA record; MR – Meet record; AR – American record;

== Diving Results ==
Event	Gold		Silver		Bronze	
1 m diving	Zhipeng Zeng; Tennessee	405.40	Hector Garcia Boissier; Penn. State	399.30	Sam Thornton; Texas A&M	390.50
3 m diving	Andrew Capobianco; Indiana	461.65	Briadam Herrera; Miami	432.75	Grayson Campbell; Texas	415.75
Platform diving	Jordan Windle; Texas	447.00	David Dinsmore; Miami	440.75	Juan Hernandez; LSU	435.80

== See also ==
- List of college swimming and diving teams
