= Bowe Becker =

American swimmer and coach (born 1997)

Personal information
- Full name: Bowe Becker
- Nickname: Bowen
- Nationality: United States
- Born: July 7, 1997 (age 29)

Sport
- Sport: Swimming
- Strokes: Freestyle
- Club: Sandpipers of Nevada
- College team: University of Minnesota
Medal record

Men's swimming
Representing the United States
Olympic Games
Gold medal – first place	2020 Tokyo	4×100 m freestyle
Representing the Minnesota Golden Gophers
NCAA Championships
Silver medal – second place	2019 Austin	100 y freestyle
Bronze medal – third place	2018 Minneapolis	50 y freestyle

Bowe Becker (born July 7, 1997) is an American swim coach and former professional swimmer. He won an Olympic gold medal at the 2020 Summer Olympics as part of the 4x100-meter freestyle relay, swimming in the prelims and the final. He swims in the International Swimming League on the team Tokyo Frog Kings.

== Early life ==
Becker graduated from Faith Lutheran High School in Las Vegas.

== Career ==
=== 2019 NCAA Championships ===
At the 2019 NCAA Division I Men's Swimming and Diving Championships in Austin, Texas in March, Becker placed second in the 100-yard freestyle representing the Minnesota Golden Gophers with a time of 40.83 seconds as a senior, finishing three hundredths of a second behind Dean Farris of Harvard University. His swim moved him to the fourth fastest performer in the event in the NCAA behind Caeleb Dressel of the Florida Gators, Vladimir Morozov of the USC Trojans, and Farris.

=== 2020: First retirement ===
Becker took a six-month retirement from swimming in 2020 in part due to the COVID-19 pandemic, and instead chose to wait tables at a lodge in Reno, Nevada.

=== 2021 ===
==== 2020 US Olympic Trials ====
Becker placed fifth in the 100-meter freestyle at the 2020 US Olympic Team Trials with a time of 48.22, which qualified him for the 2020 Olympic Games in the 4x100-meter freestyle relay. In the final of the 50-meter freestyle on June 20, he swam a 21.78 and ranked fourth overall, finishing five hundredths of a second after third-place finisher Nathan Adrian.

==== 2020 Summer Olympics ====
2020 Summer Olympics
Gold medal – first place	4×100 m freestyle	3:08.97

Becker raced in the prelims of the 4x100-meter freestyle relay at the 2020 Summer Olympics in Tokyo, Japan alongside Zach Apple, Brooks Curry, and Blake Pieroni, finishing second overall and advancing to the final. In the final, Caeleb Dressel substituted in for Curry and the relay finished first with a time of 3:08.97 and won the gold medal, with Becker splitting a 47.44. The relay's final time was the third fastest swim in the event in history. Becker was the seventh University of Minnesota Golden Gopher to win a medal at an Olympic Games. For his success on the finals relay, Becker was nominated along with his finals relay teammates only, Curry was not included in the nomination, for the 2021 Golden Goggle Award for "Relay Performance of the Year", which was an honor bestowed upon him and his finals relay teammates by the USA Swimming Foundation.

==== International Swimming League ====
For the 2021 International Swimming League, Becker was selected to the roster of team Tokyo Frog Kings. As of the end of the 2021 season, Becker had amassed 48.5 Most Valuable Player, MVP, points over the entire existence of competition in the International Swimming League, since 2019, and ranked as number 319 out of 488 swimmers in terms of total number of MVP points earned in the history of the league.

=== 2022: Transition to coaching ===
Becker started serving as a volunteer swim coach for the Minnesota Golden Gophers swim team following the 2020 Summer Olympics, and in January 2022 he swam a 19.58 in the 50-yard freestyle and a 43.10 in the 100-yard freestyle at a triple dual meet swimming in exhibition. In early March, he placed seventh in the final of the 100 meter freestyle with a time of 50.26 seconds at the 2022 Pro Swim Series stop in Westmont, Illinois. For the 50 meter freestyle prelims heats, he ranked sixth with a 22.51, which was 0.53 seconds behind first-ranked swimmer Michael Andrew and 0.08 seconds ahead of seventh-ranked Caeleb Dressel. In the final, he lowered his time to a 22.43 and placed sixth overall. On April 1, he ranked eighth in the prelims heats of the 50 meter freestyle at the Pro Swim Series stop at Northside Swim Center in San Antonio, Texas with a time of 22.71 seconds, which was 0.58 seconds slower than first-ranked David Curtiss. In the final, he equalled his prelims time of 22.71 seconds to place eighth. The following day he ranked 25th in the prelims heats of the 100 meter freestyle with a 51.30.

==== 2022 International Team Trials ====
On day one of the 2022 US International Team Trials in Greensboro, North Carolina, Becker tied for 19th-place in the 100 meter freestyle preliminary heats with a time of 49.69 seconds and did not advance to the evening final. For his second and final event of the Trials, the 50 meter freestyle on the fifth and final day, he qualified for the b-final from the morning prelims heats with an overall tenth-rank and a time of 22.22 seconds. He withdrew from and did not compete in the evening b-final.

==== Second retirement ====
The following month, Swimming World and SwimSwam published Becker had permanently retired from competitive swimming again.

== Personal best times ==
=== Long course meters (50 m pool) ===
Event	Time	Meet	Location	Date	Ref
50 m freestyle	21.78	2020 US Olympic Trials	Omaha, Nebraska	June 20, 2021	
100 m freestyle	48.22	2020 US Olympic Trials	Omaha, Nebraska	June 17, 2021	

=== Short course meters (25 m pool) ===
Event	Time	Meet	Location	Date	Ref
50 m freestyle	21.33	2019 International Swimming League	Las Vegas, Nevada	December 20, 2019	
100 m freestyle	47.39	2019 International Swimming League	Las Vegas, Nevada	December 21, 2019	

== Awards and honors ==
- Golden Goggle Award nominee, Relay Performance of the Year: 2021 (4x100 meter freestyle relay)
