= Carsten Vissering =

American bobsledder (born 1997)

Personal information
- Born: May 13, 1997 (age 29) Bethesda, Maryland, U.S.

Sport
- Country: United States
- Sport: Bobsleigh
- Event: Four-man
Medal record
Men's swimming
Representing the USC Trojans
NCAA Championships
| Gold medal – first place | 2018 Minneapolis | 4×50 y medley |
| Silver medal – second place | 2019 Austin | 100 y breaststroke |
| Bronze medal – third place | 2017 Indianapolis | 100 y breaststroke |
| Bronze medal – third place | 2018 Minneapolis | 100 y breaststroke |
| Bronze medal – third place | 2018 Minneapolis | 4×100 y medley |

Carsten Vissering (born May 13, 1997) is an American bobsledder and former swimmer. He represented the United States at the 2026 Winter Olympics.

== Swimming career ==
Vissering swam at the same club as Olympic gold medalist Katie Ledecky. He attended USC where he was a member of the swim team. During the 2018 NCAA Division I Men's Swimming and Diving Championships he won a gold medal in the 4×50 yard medley, with a then record 22.50 second breaststroke split. He also won bronze medals in the 100 yard breaststroke and 4×100 yard medley. During the 2019 NCAA Division I Men's Swimming and Diving Championships he won a silver medal in the 100 yard breaststroke. He finished his collegiate career as a five-time All-American.

== Bobsled career ==
Following his collegiate career, Vissering transitioned to bobsled in 2022. In January 2026, he was selected to represent the United States at the 2026 Winter Olympics.
