= Robert Howard (American swimmer) =

American swimmer (born 1996)

Personal information
- Nationality: American
- Born: July 8, 1996 (age 30) Alexander City, Alabama

Sport
- Sport: Swimming
- Strokes: Freestyle
- Club: DC Trident; Indiana Swim Club
- College team: University of Alabama
Medal record
World University Games
Gold medal – first place	2019 Naples	4×100 m free relay

Robert Howard (born July 8, 1996) is an American former competitive swimmer who specialized in the sprint freestyle events. He represented the DC Trident in the International Swimming League.

== Early life ==
Robert Howard was born July 8, 1996, in Alexander City, Alabama, as the son of Scott and Beverly and Bob Howard. Howard attended Benjamin Russell High School and swam for Auburn Aquatics. He was a two-time USA Scholastic All-American in 2013 and 2014 and swam collegiately at The University of Alabama from 2015 to 2019.

== College career ==
=== 2016 ===
As a freshman for the Tide, Howard placed 12th in the 100-yard freestyle (43.78), 15th in the 50-yard freestyle (19.90) and 30th in the 200-yard freestyle (1.37.74) at the 2016 Southeastern Conference (SEC) Championships. He was also a member of the 3rd place 400-yard freestyle relay. At the 2016 Men's NCAA Division I Championships, Howard contributed to the sixth place 400-yard freestyle relay.

=== 2017 ===
At the 2017 SEC Championships, he improved his rankings finishing seventh in the 100-yard freestyle (42.96), ninth in the 50-yard freestyle (19.52), and 17th in the 200-yard freestyle (1:35.17). Howard was also part of three relay teams: the runner-up 400-yard, third place 200-yard, and fifth place 800-yard freestyle. As a sophomore at the 2017 Men's NCAA Division I Championships, he was part of the 200-yard and 400-yard freestyle relays which finished fifth and ninth, as well as of the 22nd place 800-yard freestyle relay.

=== 2018 ===
Howard had a breakthrough season during his junior year by placing third in the 50-yard freestyle (19.14), fifth in the 100-yard freestyle (42.58) and ninth in the 200-yard freestyle (1:34.61) at the 2018 SEC Championships. At the 2018 Men's NCAA Division I Championships, he finished seventh in the 50-yard freestyle (19.09), 10th in the 100-yard freestyle (41.81), and 23rd in the 200-yard freestyle (1:34.42). Howard also contributed to the seventh place 400-yard freestyle relay, ninth place 200-yard medley relay, 10th place 200-yard freestyle relay and 11th place 400-yard medley relay teams.

=== 2019 ===
During his last season at Alabama, Howard had his highest finishes at both SEC and NCAA Championships. He gained the victory in both the 50 (18.74) and 100-yard freestyle (41.57), and placed fourth in the 200 freestyle (1:32.76) at the 2019 SEC Championships. He was also part of the first place 200-yard medley and freestyle relays, both setting conference and pool records, and contributed to the runner-up 400-yard medley relay team. He finished his college career placing third in the 50-yard freestyle (18.80), fifth in the 100-yard freestyle (41.75) and 19th in the 200-yard freestyle (1:33.37) at the 2019 Men's NCAA Division I Championships. Howard was also a member of the NCAA champion 200-yard medley relay team which set a pool record, the sixth place 200-yard freestyle relay as well as of the ninth place 400-yard medley and freestyle relays.

== International career ==
=== 2018 Summer Nationals ===
At the 2018 USA Swimming Championships in Irvine, California Howard placed eighth in the 50m freestyle with a new best time of 22.17 (22.18 in finals) and 11th in the 100m freestyle with a 48.67. His performance gave him a spot on the 2019 World University Games roster.

=== 2019 World University Games ===
At the 2019 World University Games in Naples, Italy, he won a gold medal as part of the 4x100m freestyle relay.

=== International Swimming League ===
Howard was a member of the inaugural International Swimming League (ISL) representing DC Trident. He competed at the first two matches held in Indianapolis, Indiana, and Naples, Italy, respectively.
