= Townley Haas =

American swimmer (born 1996)

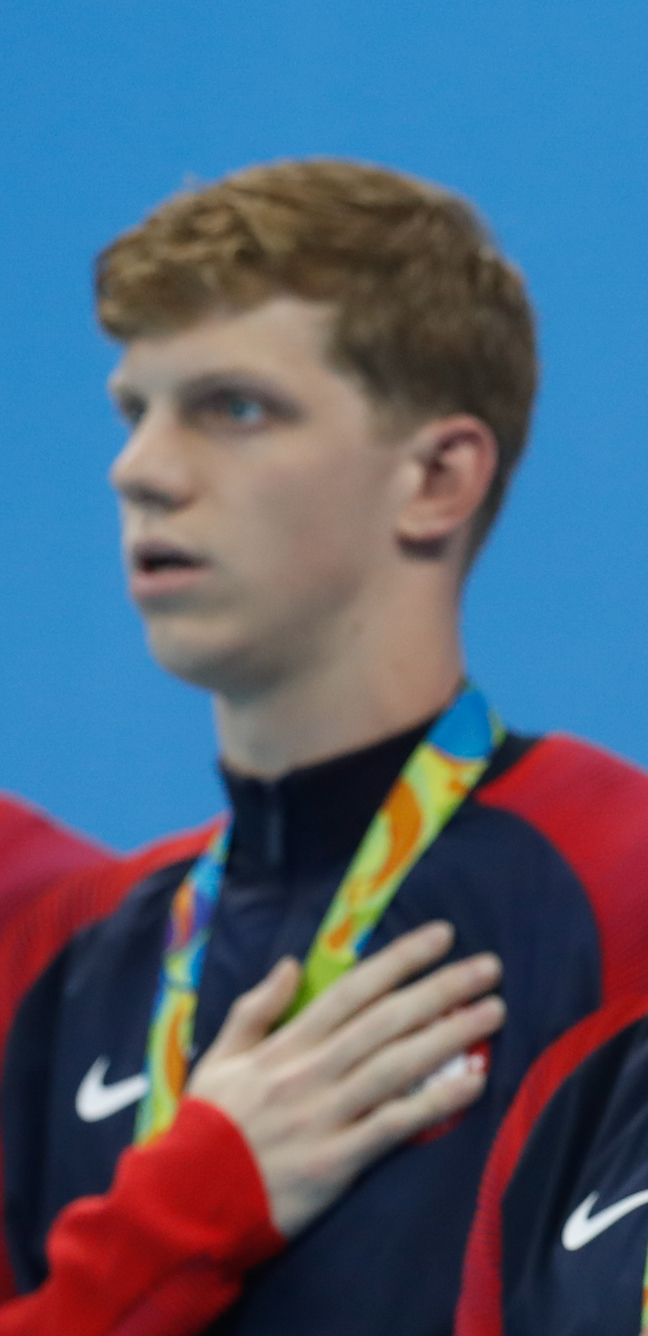
- Haas at the 2016 Summer Olympics

Personal information
- Full name: Francis Townley Haas
- Nickname: Doge Aquatic Feller Water Kitten
- National team: United States
- Born: December 13, 1996 (age 29) Richmond, Virginia, U.S.
- Height: 6 ft 5 in (1.95 m)
- Weight: 190 lb (86 kg)

Sport
- Sport: Swimming
- Strokes: Freestyle
- Club: Cali Condors; NOVA of Virginia Aquatics
- College team: University of Texas
- Coach: Eddie Reese; Kris Kubik (University of Texas)
Medal record
Men's swimming
Representing United States
Olympic Games
Gold medal – first place	2016 Rio de Janeiro	4×200 m freestyle
World Championships
Gold medal – first place	2017 Budapest	4×100 m freestyle
Gold medal – first place	2017 Budapest	4×100 m medley
Gold medal – first place	2017 Budapest	4×100 m mixed freestyle
Gold medal – first place	2019 Gwangju	4×100 m freestyle
Silver medal – second place	2017 Budapest	200 m freestyle
Bronze medal – third place	2017 Budapest	4×200 m freestyle
Bronze medal – third place	2019 Gwangju	4×200 m freestyle
Pan Pacific Championships
Gold medal – first place	2018 Tokyo	200 m freestyle
Gold medal – first place	2018 Tokyo	4×200 m freestyle
Junior Pan Pacific Championships
Gold medal – first place	2014 Maui	200 m freestyle
Gold medal – first place	2014 Maui	800 m freestyle
Gold medal – first place	2014 Maui	4×100 m freestyle
Gold medal – first place	2014 Maui	4×200 m freestyle
Gold medal – first place	2014 Maui	4×100 m medley
Representing the Texas Longhorns
Event	1st	2nd	3rd
NCAA Championships	10	2	1
Total	10	2	1
By race
Event	1st	2nd	3rd
200 y freestyle	3	0	0
500 y freestyle	3	1	0
4×100 y freestyle	2	0	0
4×200 y freestyle	2	1	1
Total	10	2	1
NCAA Championships
Gold medal – first place	2016 Atlanta	200 y freestyle
Gold medal – first place	2016 Atlanta	500 y freestyle
Gold medal – first place	2016 Atlanta	4×200 y freestyle
Gold medal – first place	2017 Indianapolis	200 y freestyle
Gold medal – first place	2017 Indianapolis	4×100 y freestyle
Gold medal – first place	2018 Minneapolis	200 y freestyle
Gold medal – first place	2018 Minneapolis	500 y freestyle
Gold medal – first place	2019 Austin	500 y freestyle
Gold medal – first place	2019 Austin	4×100 y freestyle
Gold medal – first place	2019 Austin	4×200 y freestyle
Silver medal – second place	2017 Indianapolis	500 y freestyle
Silver medal – second place	2017 Indianapolis	4×200 y freestyle
Bronze medal – third place	2018 Minneapolis	4×200 y freestyle

Francis Townley Haas (born December 13, 1996) is an American retired competitive swimmer who specialized in freestyle events. He is an Olympic gold medalist in the 4 × 200 m freestyle relay from the 2016 Summer Olympics in Rio de Janeiro. Haas competed collegiately for the University of Texas at Austin from 2015 to 2019 under head coach Eddie Reese where he was a 10-time NCAA Champion, a 17-time All-American, and a 3-time NCAA team champion (2016, 2017, and 2018). He is the former American record-holder in the 200-yard freestyle (1:29.50) and represented the Cali Condors in the International Swimming League.

== Background ==
Haas grew up in Richmond, Virginia (where his family still lives) and graduated from Benedictine College Prep. Before his college career, he swam for Geoff Brown at Nova of Virginia Aquatics (NOVA), which sent nine swimmers to the 2016 Olympic Trials in Omaha, Nebraska. In College, Haas swam for Hall of Fame Coaches Eddie Reese, and Kris Kubik at the University of Texas.

Townley has two siblings, an older sister, Emily, and older brother, Wyatt. His sister was shot twice in the Virginia Tech Shooting, but survived. His mother is the Virginia State Director for the Coalition to Stop Gun Violence.

In December 2020, Haas announced his engagement to his girlfriend of over 5 years, Megan Meseck. They married on May 28, 2022.

== Career ==
=== 2014: Five-time Junior Pan Pacific gold medalist ===
==== 2014 Junior Pan Pacific Championships ====
In August 2014, as a 17-year-old at the 2014 Junior Pan Pacific Swimming Championships in Hawaii, Haas won gold medals in five events, the 200 meter freestyle with a Championships record time of 1:48.32, the 800 meter freestyle with a 8:00.99, the 4×100 meter freestyle relay with a 3:18.68, the 4×200 meter freestyle with a 7:21.36, and the 4×100 meter medley relay with a 3:39.09.

=== 2016 ===
==== 2016 NCAA Championships ====
On the first day of the 2016 NCAA Division I Men's Swimming and Diving Championships in his freshman season, Haas won the 4×200-yard freestyle relay for the Longhorns alongside teammates Jack Conger, Clark Smith, and Joseph Schooling, setting a new U.S. Open record with Haas swimming the fastest relay split ever for a 200-yard freestyle in 1:30.52. The next day, Haas won his first individual NCAA Championship in the 500-yard freestyle going 4:09.00. Following his title in the 500, Haas set a new precedent in the 200-yard freestyle by becoming the first man to ever break the 1:31.00 barrier in a new NCAA, American, and U.S. Open record time of 1:30.46. This time eclipsed the elusive 10-year-old mark of 1:31.20 held by the Arizona Wildcat Simon Burnett.

==== 2016 U.S. Olympic Trials ====
At the 2016 U.S. Olympic Trials in Omaha, Nebraska, Haas won the 200-meter freestyle in 1:45.66 ahead of Conor Dwyer and Jack Conger, qualifying for the 2016 Olympic Games in Rio de Janeiro. Haas also placed third in the 400 m freestyle.

==== 2016 Summer Olympics ====
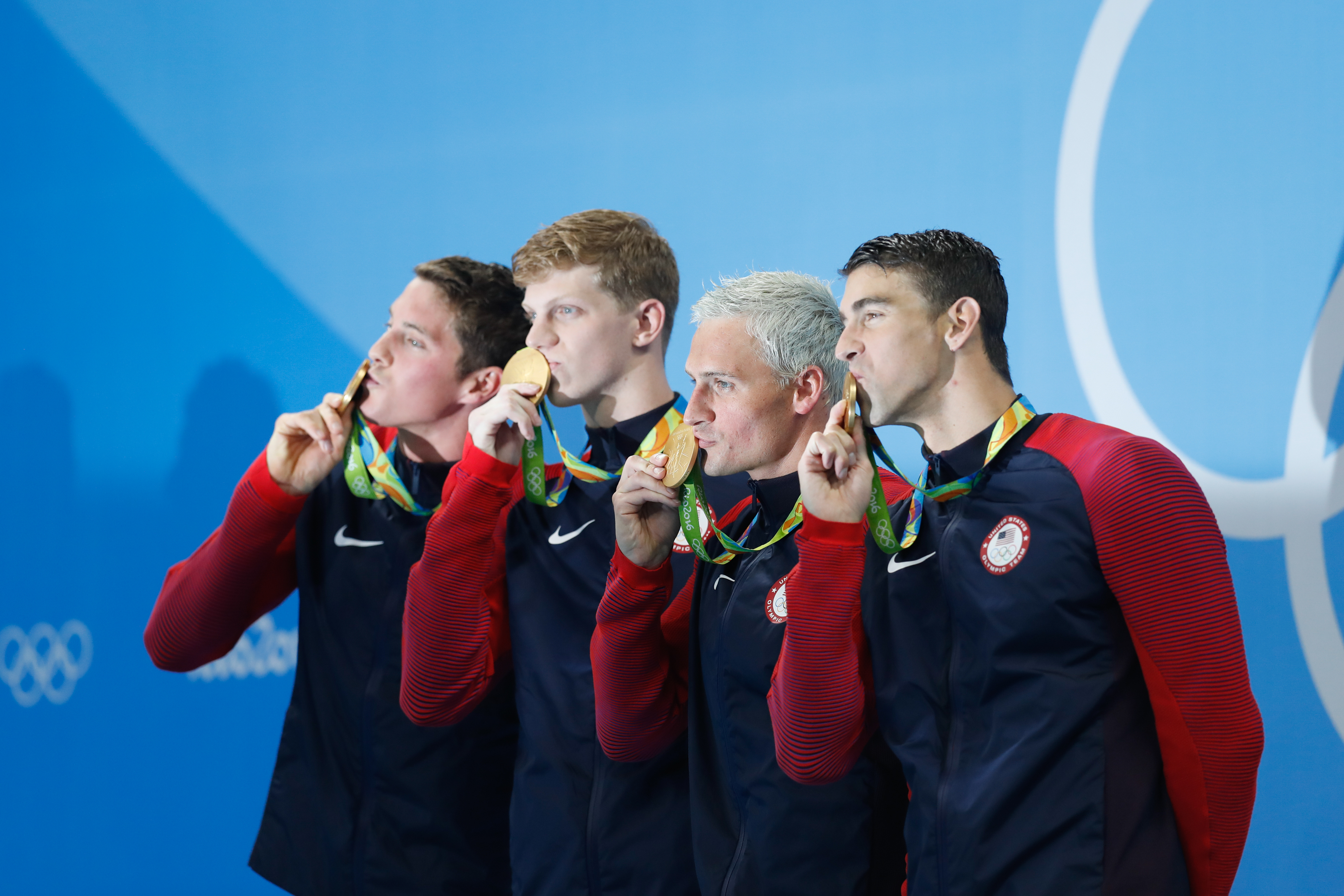
Conor Dwyer, Haas, Ryan Lochte, and Michael Phelps celebrating a victory in the 4 × 200 m freestyle relay.

At the Rio Olympics, Haas placed fifth in the 200-meter freestyle and won gold in the 4×200-meter freestyle relay. He swam the second leg of the relay, providing the fastest split of the entire field by 0.71 seconds going 1:44.14.

=== 2017 ===
==== 2017 NCAA Championships ====
At the 2017 NCAA Division I Men's Swimming and Diving Championships, Haas again won the 200 free, going just shy of his record time in 1:30.65. His second victory of the meet came in the 400 freestyle relay, with Haas splitting a 41.01 on the third leg. His relay consisting of Brett Ringgold, Jack Conger and Joseph Schooling set a new NCAA and U.S. Open record in 2:45.39. In the 500 free, Haas wasn't able to defend his title and finished second behind teammate Clark Smith, swimming a personal best time of 4:08.92. Haas also failed to defend Texas' title in the 800 free relay, finishing second behind NC State.

==== 2017 World Championships ====
2017 World Championships
Gold medal – first place	4×100 m freestyle	3:10.06
Gold medal – first place	4×100 m medley	3:27.91
Gold medal – first place	4×100 m mixed freestyle	3:19.60 (WR)
Silver medal – second place	200 m freestyle	1:45.04
Bronze medal – third place	4×200 m freestyle	7:03.18

Swimming in the 2017 World Championships, Haas won 3 gold medals, as well as earning a silver and a bronze. In the 200 m free, Haas placed second behind Sun Yang, earning himself his first major international medal in an individual event. Since Caeleb Dressel, 2017 world champion in the 100 m freestyle, was swimming the butterfly leg of the medley relay, this allowed Haas to swim the freestyle portion of the 4×100 medley relay preliminaries, which won him his second gold medal of the competition. Haas picked up his third gold medal by virtue of the 4 × 100 m mixed free relay prelims. Swimming the second leg of the 4 × 200 m free relay, Haas split 1:44.58 to pick up a bronze medal behind Great Britain and Russia.

=== 2018 ===
==== 2018 NCAA Championships ====
Swimming in his junior season at the 2018 NCAA Division I Men's Swimming and Diving Championships, Haas anchored the Longhorns to a third-place finish in the 800 free relay. Earlier in the race, Blake Pieroni broke Haas' American record in the 200 y free while leading off the Indiana Hoosiers' relay. Pieroni's 1:29.63 not only broke Haas' American record by almost a second, it also made Pieroni the first man to ever swim under the 1:30.00 barrier in the 200 y free. Two days later, Haas raced Pieroni head-to-head in the individual 200 free. Stepping up to the plate, Haas beat him in a new NCAA, American, and U.S. Open record time of 1:29.50, taking his record back after a 2-day hiatus. Haas also won the 500 free in a new personal best time of 4:08.60 and got 6th place in the 100 free (41.67).

==== 2018 Pan Pacific Championships ====
In Tokyo, Haas got more hardware by winning two gold medals. In the 200 m freestyle, Haas outlasted United States teammate Andrew Seliskar, winning in 1:45.56 to Seliskar's 1:45.74. On the second day of competition, Haas competed in the 4 × 200 m freestyle relay alongside Andrew Seliskar, Blake Pieroni, and Zach Apple. With only one swimmer left to swim, the USA dove in 1.40 seconds behind Australia. The Aussie lead slowly diminished as Haas closed on Jack Cartwright. With his final lunge to the wall, Haas outtouched Cartwright in a clutch swim as the USA beat Australia 7:04.36 to 7:04.70. Haas' split of 1:43.78 was the 3rd fastest rolling-start split in history.

=== 2019 ===
==== 2019 NCAA Championships ====
In his final season as a collegiate athlete, Haas entered the 2019 NCAA Championships at his home pool in Austin, Texas looking to repeat his title in the 500 y freestyle, and 4-peat his 200 y freestyle titles. Swimming the anchor leg of the 800 free relay, Haas split 1:29.66 to give the Longhorns the victory as well as a new NCAA, American, and U.S. Open record time of 6:05.08. Swimming in the heat prior to the Longhorns', Harvard's Dean Farris broke Haas' 200 free American record while leading off the Crimson's 800 free relay in 1:29.15. On day 2 of the competition, Haas repeated his title in the 500 free with a new NCAA record time of 4:08.19. While looking to make a clean sweep of 200 freestyles at the NCAAs and retake his American record, Haas eventually finished a distant 4th place in 1:31.80, well off his personal best time. In the last race of his college career, Haas anchored the Longhorns to a victory in the 400 free relay (2:45.12), splitting 40.76. Despite the victory, the Longhorns finished second in the team standings to the Cal Golden Bears.

==== 2019 World Championships ====
2019 World Championships
Gold medal – first place	4×100 m freestyle	3:09.06
Bronze medal – third place	4×200 m freestyle	7:01.98

In his first event at the 2019 World Championships, Haas swam in the prelims of the 4 × 100 m free relay, leading off in 48.60. The relay would go on to victory later that night, winning Haas a gold medal. In the 200 m free, Haas regressed to 14th place going 1:46.37, well off his silver medal performance from 2 years prior. Swimming the anchor leg of the 800 free relay, Haas split 1:45.16 to get the USA on the podium with a bronze medal.

==== 2019 International Swimming League ====
In 2019 he was a member of the inaugural International Swimming League representing the Cali Condors, who finished third place in the final match in Las Vegas, Nevada in December. Haas competed in the 200 meter and 400 meter freestyle races as well as relay events throughout the season.

=== 2022: Retirement ===
In February 2022, Haas announced his retirement from competitive swimming through his Instagram post.

== Personal bests ==
As of March 4, 2021

Long course
Event	Time	Meet	Date	Note(s)
100 m freestyle	48.20	2017 U.S. Summer Nationals	June 27, 2017	
200 m freestyle	1:45.03	2017 U.S. Summer Nationals	June 28, 2017	
400 m freestyle	3:45.04	2016 U.S. Olympic Trials	June 26, 2016	

Short course
Event	Time	Meet	Date	Note(s)
200 m freestyle	1:40.49	2020 International Swimming League Final	November 22, 2020	Current American record
400 m freestyle	3:52.37	2020 International Swimming League Match 1	October 15, 2020	

Short course yards
Event	Time	Meet	Date	Note(s)
100 y freestyle	41.67	2018 NCAA Championships	March 24, 2018	
200 y freestyle	1:29.50	2018 NCAA Championships	March 23, 2018	Former NCAA, American, and U.S. Open record
500 y freestyle	4:08.19	2019 NCAA Championships	March 28, 2019	Big 12 Conference and University of Texas school record, former NCAA record
1650 y freestyle	14:34.36	2016 NCAA Championships	March 26, 2016	

== See also ==
- List of Olympic medalists in swimming (men)
- List of World Aquatics Championships medalists in swimming (men)
- List of United States records in swimming
- List of University of Texas at Austin alumni
- NCAA Division I Men's Swimming and Diving Championships
- Texas Longhorns swimming and diving
- Texas Longhorns
