= John Shebat =

American swimmer (born 1997)

Personal information
- National team: United States
- Born: February 17, 1997 (age 29) Oak Hill, Virginia, U.S.
- Height: 6 ft 2 in (188 cm)

Sport
- Sport: Swimming
- Strokes: Backstroke, butterfly, individual medley
- Club: Nation's Capital Swim Club
- College team: University of Texas at Austin
- Coach: Eddie Reese
Medal record
Men's swimming
Representing the United States
World University Games
Gold medal – first place	2019 Naples	4×100 m medley
Representing the Texas Longhorns
Event	1st	2nd	3rd
NCAA Championships	5	4	3
Total	5	4	3
By race
Event	1st	2nd	3rd
100 y backstroke	0	2	0
200 y backstroke	1	2	0
200 y medley	0	0	1
4×50 y medley	1	0	1
4×100 y freestyle	1	0	0
4×100 y medley	2	0	1
Total	5	4	3
NCAA Championships
Gold medal – first place	2016 Atlanta	4×100 y medley
Gold medal – first place	2017 Indianapolis	4×50 y medley
Gold medal – first place	2017 Indianapolis	4×100 y medley
Gold medal – first place	2019 Austin	200 y backstroke
Gold medal – first place	2019 Austin	4×100 y freestyle
Silver medal – second place	2017 Indianapolis	100 y backstroke
Silver medal – second place	2017 Indianapolis	200 y backstroke
Silver medal – second place	2018 Minneapolis	100 y backstroke
Silver medal – second place	2018 Minneapolis	200 y backstroke
Bronze medal – third place	2016 Atlanta	4×50 y medley
Bronze medal – third place	2019 Austin	200 y medley
Bronze medal – third place	2019 Austin	4×100 y medley

John Shebat (born February 17, 1997) is an American competition swimmer who specializes in backstroke, medley, and butterfly events. He is a gold medalist in the 4×100-meter medley relay from the 2019 World University Games in Naples, swimming the butterfly leg.

Shebat competed for the University of Texas at Austin from 2015 to 2019 where he was a 5-time NCAA champion, 3-time NCAA team champion, a 16-time All American, and the 2019 Big 12 Men's Swimmer of the Year. He is also an incumbent NCAA and U.S. Open record-holder in the 4×50-yard and 4×100-yard medley relays. As a professional swimmer, Shebat represented the Cali Condors in the International Swimming League's inaugural 2019 season.

== Personal bests ==
As of September 10, 2020

Long course
Event	Time	Meet	Date	Note(s)
100 m backstroke	54.20	2016 U.S. Olympic Trials	June 28, 2016	
100 m butterfly	51.95	2019 U.S. National Championships	August 2, 2019	
200 m IM	1:59.24	2019 U.S. National Championships	August 4, 2019	

Short course yards
Event	Time	Meet	Date	Note(s)
100 y backstroke	44.35	2017 NCAA Championships	March 24, 2017	Big 12 Conference record, University of Texas school record
200 y backstroke	1:36.42	2019 NCAA Championships	March 30, 2019	Big 12 Conference record, University of Texas school record
200 y IM	1:39.63	2019 NCAA Championships	March 28, 2019	Big 12 Conference record, University of Texas school record

== See also ==
- NCAA Division I Men's Swimming and Diving Championships
- List of University of Texas at Austin alumni
- Texas Longhorns swimming and diving
- Texas Longhorns
