= Tate Jackson =

American swimmer (born 1997)

Personal information
- National team: United States
- Born: February 4, 1997 (age 29) Paris, France
- Height: 6 ft 4 in (193.0 cm)
- Weight: 187 lb (85 kg)

Sport
- Sport: Swimming
- Strokes: Freestyle
- Club: Longhorn Aquatics; Cali Condors
- College team: University of Texas at Austin
- Coach: Eddie Reese
Medal record
Men's swimming
Representing the United States
Event	1st	2nd	3rd
Summer Universiade	2	1	0
Total	2	1	0
Summer Universiade
Gold medal – first place	2019 Naples	4×100 m freestyle
Gold medal – first place	2019 Naples	4×100 m medley
Silver medal – second place	2019 Naples	100 m freestyle
Representing the Texas Longhorns
Event	1st	2nd	3rd
NCAA Championships	2	0	2
Total	2	0	2
NCAA Championships
Gold medal – first place	2017 Indianapolis	4×50 y freestyle
Gold medal – first place	2019 Austin	4×100 y freestyle
Bronze medal – third place	2019 Austin	4×100 y medley
Bronze medal – third place	2019 Austin	4×50 y freestyle

Tate Jackson (born February 4, 1997) is an American competition swimmer who specializes in sprint freestyle events. He is a two-time gold medalist in the 4 × 100 m freestyle relay and 4 × 100 m medley relay, and a silver medalist in the 100 m freestyle at the 2019 World University Games. As a collegiate athlete for the University of Texas, Jackson was a two-time NCAA champion, an 11-time All American, a three-time NCAA team champion, and an eight-time Big 12 Conference champion. He is also the current conference and school record-holder in the 100-yard freestyle (41.06). As a professional athlete, Jackson represents the Cali Condors in the International Swimming League. In 2021, he was given a one-month ban for breaking anti-doping regulations.

== Personal bests ==
As of September 21, 2020

Long course
Event	Time	Meet	Date	Note(s)
50 m freestyle	22.09	2018 Phillips 66 Summer National Championships	July 29, 2018	
100 m freestyle	47.88	2019 Phillips 66 Summer National Championships	July 31, 2019	

Short course yards
Event	Time	Meet	Date	Note(s)
50 y freestyle	18.79 (r)	Texas Hall of Fame Invitational	November 29, 2018	Relay leadoff
100 y freestyle	41.06	Texas Hall of Fame Invitational	December 1, 2018	Big 12 Conference record, University of Texas school record

== See also ==
- NCAA Division I Men's Swimming and Diving Championships
- List of University of Texas at Austin alumni
- Texas Longhorns swimming and diving
- Texas Longhorns
