= 2017 NCAA Division I Men's Swimming and Diving Championships =

American college aquatic sports competition

2017 NCAA Division I Swimming and Diving Championships
- Host city: Indianapolis, Indiana
- Date: March 23–25, 2017
- Venue(s): Indiana University Natatorium; Indiana University – Purdue University Indianapolis

The 2017 NCAA Division I Men's Swimming and Diving Championships were contested from March 22–25, 2017 at the Indiana University Natatorium at Indiana University – Purdue University Indianapolis in Indianapolis, Indiana at the 94th annual NCAA-sanctioned swim meet to determine the team and individual national champions of Division I men's collegiate swimming and diving in the United States.

== Team standings ==
- Note: Top 10 only
- (H) = Hosts
- ^{(DC)} = Defending champions
- Italics = Debut finish in the Top 10
- Full results

Rank	Team	Points
1st place, gold medalist(s)	Texas ^{(DC)}	542
2nd place, silver medalist(s)	California	349
3rd place, bronze medalist(s)	Florida	294.5
4	NC State	272.5
5	Stanford	242
6	USC	237
7	Indiana (H)	229.5
8	Georgia	183
9	Missouri	179.5
10	Alabama	153.5

== Swimming results ==
Event	Gold		Silver		Bronze	
50 freestyle	Caeleb Dressel; Florida	18.23	Ryan Held; NC State	18.60	Joseph Schooling; Texas	18.79
100 freestyle	Caeleb Dressel; Florida	40.00; US, AR	Michael Chadwick; Missouri	40.95	Ryan Held; NC State	41.21
200 freestyle	Townley Haas; Texas	1:30.65	Blake Pieroni; Indiana Dylan Carter; USC	1:31.16	None awarded	
500 freestyle	Clark Smith; Texas	4:08.42; US, AR	Townley Haas; Texas	4:08.92	Felix Auboeck; Michigan	4:08.95
1650 freestyle	Clark Smith; Texas	14:22.41; US, AR	Felix Auboeck; Michigan	14:22.88	Akaram Mahmoud; South Carolina	14:22.99
100 backstroke	Ryan Murphy; California	43.99	John Shebat; Texas	44.35	Connor Oslin; Alabama	44.56
200 backstroke	Ryan Murphy; California	1:36.75	John Shebat; Texas	1:37.24	Patrick Mulcare; USC	1:37.80
100 breaststroke	Will Licon; Texas	50.68	Fabian Schwingenschlogl; Missouri	50.77	Carsten Vissering; USC	51.40
200 breaststroke	Will Licon; Texas	1:47.91; US, AR	Anton McKee; Alabama	1:51.22	Mauro Castillo Luna; Texas A&M	1:52.09
100 butterfly	Caeleb Dressel; Florida	43.58; US, AR	Joseph Schooling; Texas	43.75	Jack Conger; Texas	44.35
200 butterfly	Jack Conger; Texas	1:37.35; US, AR	Zheng Quah; California	1:38.83	Gunnar Bentz; Georgia	1:40.07
200 IM	Will Licon; Texas Mark Szaranek; Florida	1:40.67	None awarded		Ryan Murphy; California	1:40.73
400 IM	Chase Kalisz; Georgia	3:33.42; US, AR	Andrew Seliskar; California	3:36.18	Mark Szaranek; Florida	3:36.31
200 freestyle relay	Texas; Brett Ringgold (18.96); Jack Conger (18.37); Tate Jackson (18.92); Joseph Schooling (18.34)	1:14.59	Florida; Caeleb Dressel (18.23); Jan Świtkowski (18.75); Enzo Martinez (18.72); Jack Blyzinskj (19.18)	1:14.88	California; Pawel Sendyk (18.92); Michael Jensen (18.75); Justin Lynch (18.70); Matthew Josa (18.92)	1:15.29
400 freestyle relay	Texas; Brett Ringgold (42.06); Jack Conger (41.30); Townley Haas (41.01); Joseph Schooling (41.02)	2:45.39; US	Florida; Caeleb Dressel (40.48); Jan Świtkowski (41.50); Maxime Rooney (42.13); Mark Szaranek (42.10)	2:46.21	USC; Santo Condorelli (41.87); Ralf Tribuntsov (41.80); Dylan Carter (41.10); Reed Malone (42.56)	2:47.33
800 freestyle relay	NC State; Ryan Held (1:31.37); Andreas Vazaios (1:32.23); Justin Ress (1:32.26); Soeren Dahl (1:30.67)	6:06.53; US	Texas; Jack Conger (1:31.54); Jeff Newkirk (1:33.25); Clark Smith (1:33.40); Townley Haas (1:30.42)	6:08.61; AR	Florida; Jan Świtkowski (1:32.44); Maxime Rooney (1:32.67); Mitch D'Arrigo (1:32.73); Mark Szaranek (1:31.46)	6:09.30
200 medley relay	Texas; John Shebat (20.84); Will Licon (22.91); Joseph Schooling (19.45); Brett Ringgold (18.34)	1:21.54; US	Alabama; Connor Oslin (20.39); Pavel Romanov (23.30); Luke Kaliszak (19.94); Zane Waddell (18.26)	1:21.89	California; Ryan Murphy (20.47); Connor Hoppe (23.16); Justin Lynch (20.04); Pawel Sendyk (18.61)	1:22.28
400 medley relay	Texas; John Shebat (44.58); Will Licon (49.75); Joseph Schooling (43.60); Jack Conger (41.29)	2:59.22; US	California; Ryan Murphy (44.32); Connor Hoppe (50.97); Matthew Josa (44.59); Michael Jensen (41.63)	3:01.51; AR	Missouri; Daniel Hein (45.99); Fabian Schwingenschlogl (50.22); Andrew Sansoucie (44.98); Michael Chadwick (40.72)	3:01.91

Legend: US – U.S. Open record; AR – American record;

== Diving results ==
Event	Gold		Silver		Bronze	
1 m diving	Steele Johnson; Purdue	446.90	Michael Hixon; Indiana	437.70	James Connor; Indiana	437.30
3 m diving	Steele Johnson; Purdue	502.20	Briadam Herrea; Miami	477.30	Juan Hernandez; LSU	464.35
Platform diving	David Dinsmore; Miami	528.20	Steele Johnson; Purdue	502.20	Zhipeng Zeng; Ohio State	478.25

== See also ==
- List of college swimming and diving teams
