= Andrew Seliskar =

American swimmer (born 1996)

Personal information
- Full name: Andrew Hammond Seliskar
- Nickname: Seli
- National team: United States
- Born: September 26, 1996 (age 29) Charlotte, North Carolina, U.S.
- Height: 1.82 m (6 ft 0 in)
- Weight: 84 kg (185 lb)

Sport
- Sport: Swimming
- Strokes: Breaststroke, butterfly, freestyle, medley
- Club: Nation's Capital Swim Club
- College team: California Golden Bears
Medal record
Men's swimming
Representing the United States
World Championships
Bronze medal – third place	2019 Gwangju	4×200 m freestyle
Pan Pacific Championships
Gold medal – first place	2018 Tokyo	4×200 m freestyle
Silver medal – second place	2018 Tokyo	200 m freestyle
Summer Universiade
Gold medal – first place	2015 Gwangju	4×200 m freestyle
World Junior Championships
Gold medal – first place	2013 Dubai	200 m butterfly
Bronze medal – third place	2013 Dubai	4×200 m freestyle
Junior Pan Pacific Championships
Gold medal – first place	2014 Maui	200 m butterfly
Gold medal – first place	2014 Maui	200 m medley
Gold medal – first place	2014 Maui	400 m medley
Gold medal – first place	2014 Maui	4×200 m freestyle
Silver medal – second place	2014 Maui	100 m butterfly
Representing the California Golden Bears
Event	1st	2nd	3rd
NCAA Championships	4	3	5
Total	4	3	5
By race
Event	1st	2nd	3rd
200 y breaststroke	1	1	0
200 y butterfly	0	0	1
200 y freestyle	1	0	0
200 y medley	1	0	0
400 y medley	0	1	1
4×50 y freestyle	1	0	0
4×100 y freestyle	0	0	2
4×200 y freestyle	0	0	1
4×100 y medley	0	1	0
Total	4	3	5
NCAA Championships
Gold medal – first place	2019 Austin	200 y breaststroke
Gold medal – first place	2019 Austin	200 y freestyle
Gold medal – first place	2019 Austin	200 y medley
Gold medal – first place	2019 Austin	4×50 y freestyle
Silver medal – second place	2017 Indianapolis	400 y medley
Silver medal – second place	2018 Minneapolis	200 y breaststroke
Silver medal – second place	2019 Austin	4×100 y medley
Bronze medal – third place	2016 Atlanta	200 y butterfly
Bronze medal – third place	2018 Minneapolis	400 y medley
Bronze medal – third place	2018 Minneapolis	4×100 y freestyle
Bronze medal – third place	2019 Austin	4×100 y freestyle
Bronze medal – third place	2019 Austin	4×200 y freestyle

Andrew Hammond Seliskar (born September 26, 1996) is a retired American competitive swimmer. He won the gold medal in the 200 meter butterfly at the 2013 FINA World Junior Swimming Championships in Dubai, breaking the Championships record.

Seliskar swam in college for the California Golden Bears at the University of California, Berkeley and currently swims for California Aquatics. Previously, he attended Thomas Jefferson High School for Science and Technology in Virginia and swam for Nation's Capital Swim Club. In 2015 he was named male High School Swimmer of the Year.

== University of California, Berkeley ==
Seliskar trained under Dave Durden at the University of California, Berkeley.

=== 2015–2016 ===
Seliskar won victories in the 200-yard butterfly, 200-yard and 400-yard individual medley, 400-yard and 800-yard freestyle relays, and 400-yard medley relay. Additionally, he was honored as the Pac-12 Freshman/Newcomer of the Year.

At the NCAA Championships 2016, he won the bronze medal in the 200-yard butterfly men and reached the final round in 200 and 400 individual medley men events, ranked 7th and 5th respectively.

=== 2016–2017 ===
During his second year at the NCAA Championships 2017, Seliskar won a silver medal in the 400-yard medley. He finished 6th in the 200-yard butterfly and individual medley.

=== 2017–2018 ===
Seliskar led UC Berkeley's 800-yard freestyle relay, securing a 6th-place finish while setting a new school record of 1:31.28. He achieved a 13th finish in the 400-yard individual medley, and a 5th finish in the 200-yard individual medley. Seliskar came in 2nd in the 200-yard breaststroke. Seliskar contributed to a 3rd-place finish in the 400-yard freestyle relay.

=== 2018–2019 ===
In his final year, Seliskar achieved his 11th Pac-12 title on the last night of the 2019 PAC-12 Championships. This achievement broke both Cal's school record and the Pac-12 Conference record for the highest number of individual conference titles by a male swimmer since the championship's inception in 1961. Seliskar set new Conference Championship records in the 200-yard freestyle and 200-yard breaststroke, while also securing a victory in the 200-yard individual medley His performance contributed to the Cal Golden Bears' tally of 15 wins throughout the meet, including a clean sweep of the event titles on the final day of competition.

At the NCAA Championships 2019, Seliskar won all of his individual events. This achievement marked his first individual NCAA title, and also earned him a total of three titles, solidifying his status as the Swimmer of the Meet. He won the 200-yard individual medley, the 200-yard freestyle, and the 200-yard breaststroke.

== International career ==
=== 2013 ===
In August 2013, he won the gold medal in the 200 meter butterfly at the 2013 FINA World Junior Championships, and the Championship category's Record.

In December 2013, he won the gold medal in the 400 yard individual medley at the senior 2013 Winter National Championships. He also won silver medals in the 200 meter individual medley and the 200 meter butterfly.

=== 2014 ===
Seliskar broke the junior world record in the 200 meter butterfly (long course) at the 2014 junior Pan Pacific Championships. He won three individual gold medals at that meet, in the 200 meter butterfly (1:55.92), 200 meter individual medley (2:00.81), and the 400 meter individual medley (4:16.05), as well as a silver medal in the 100 meter butterfly (53.14). He also won a gold medal in the 4×200 meter freestyle relay, contributing a split time of 1:52.05 to the final time of 7:21.36.

=== 2015 ===
In 2015, Seliskar competed at the Summer Universiade in Gwangju, South Korea, and finished 8th in the 50-meter and 200-meter butterfly events.

=== 2021 ===
==== 2020 US Olympic Trials ====
In June 2021, Seliskar qualified for the 2020 Olympic Games by placing 4th with a 1:46.34 in the 200 meter freestyle at the US Olympic Swimming Trials in Omaha, Nebraska.

==== 2020 Summer Olympics ====
At the 2020 Summer Olympics in Tokyo, Japan, Seliskar competed in the prelims of the 4x200 meter freestyle relay along with Blake Pieroni, Patrick Callan, and Drew Kibler. Together they finished in fifth place and advanced the relay to the final. In the final, the relay finished fourth overall, not winning an Olympic medal.

=== 2022: Retirement ===
In March 2022, Seliskar announced his retirement from competitive swimming.

== Post-professional swimming ==
Following his departure from competitive swimming, Seliskar became a business analyst at McKinsey & Company in April 2022.

== Awards ==
- SwimSwam Swammy Award, NCAA Swimmer of the Year (male): 2019
- Swimming World, High School Swimmer of the Year (male): 2015
- SwimSwam Swammy Award, Age Group Swimmer of the Year 17—18 (male): 2014
- SwimSwam Swammy Award, Age Group Swimmer of the Year 15—16 (male): 2013
- SwimSwam Top 100 (Men's): 2021 (#49)
