= Jack Conger =

American swimmer (born 1994)

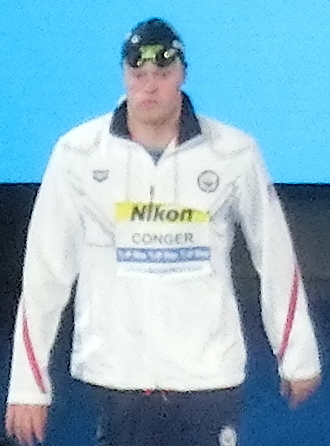
- Conger at the 2017 FINA World Championships

Personal information
- Full name: John Peet Conger
- National team: United States
- Born: September 26, 1994 (age 31) Rockville, Maryland, U.S.
- Height: 6 ft 4 in (193 cm)
- Weight: 180 lb (82 kg)

Sport
- Sport: Swimming
- Strokes: Butterfly, Freestyle
- Club: Nation's Capital Swim Club; Virginia Tech Swim Club
- College team: University of Texas at Austin
- Coach: Sergio López Miró; Eddie Reese, Kris Kubik (University of Texas)
Medal record
Men's swimming
Representing the United States
| Event | 1st | 2nd | 3rd |
|---|---|---|---|
| Olympic Games | 1 | 0 | 0 |
| World Championships (LC) | 0 | 1 | 2 |
| World Championships (SC) | 2 | 1 | 0 |
| Pan Pacs | 0 | 1 | 0 |
| Summer Universiade | 2 | 2 | 2 |
| Total | 5 | 5 | 4 |
Olympic Games
| Gold medal – first place | 2016 Rio de Janeiro | 4×200 m freestyle |
World Championships (LC)
| Silver medal – second place | 2019 Gwangju | 4×100 m medley |
| Bronze medal – third place | 2017 Budapest | 4×200 m freestyle |
| Bronze medal – third place | 2019 Gwangju | 4×200 m freestyle |
World Championships (SC)
| Gold medal – first place | 2018 Hangzhou | 4×50 m freestyle |
| Gold medal – first place | 2018 Hangzhou | 4×100 m medley |
| Silver medal – second place | 2018 Hangzhou | 4×50 m medley |
Pan Pacific Championships
| Silver medal – second place | 2018 Tokyo | 100 m butterfly |
Summer Universiade
| Gold medal – first place | 2013 Kazan | 200 m backstroke |
| Gold medal – first place | 2015 Gwangju | 4×100 m freestyle |
| Silver medal – second place | 2015 Gwangju | 100 m freestyle |
| Silver medal – second place | 2015 Gwangju | 4×100 m medley |
| Bronze medal – third place | 2013 Kazan | 4×100 m medley |
| Bronze medal – third place | 2015 Gwangju | 100 m backstroke |
Junior Pan Pacific Championships
| Gold medal – first place | 2012 Honolulu | 50 m freestyle |
| Gold medal – first place | 2012 Honolulu | 100 m backstroke |
| Gold medal – first place | 2012 Honolulu | 200 m backstroke |
| Gold medal – first place | 2012 Honolulu | 4×100 m freestyle |
| Silver medal – second place | 2012 Honolulu | 4×100 m medley |
| Bronze medal – third place | 2012 Honolulu | 100 m freestyle |
Representing the Texas Longhorns
| Event | 1st | 2nd | 3rd |
|---|---|---|---|
| NCAA Championships | 9 | 6 | 2 |
| Total | 9 | 6 | 2 |
By race
| Event | 1st | 2nd | 3rd |
|---|---|---|---|
| 100 y butterfly | 0 | 1 | 2 |
| 200 y butterfly | 1 | 2 | 0 |
| 4×50 y freestyle | 3 | 0 | 0 |
| 4×100 y freestyle | 1 | 1 | 0 |
| 4×200 y freestyle | 1 | 1 | 0 |
| 4×50 y medley | 0 | 1 | 0 |
| 4×100 y medley | 3 | 0 | 0 |
| Total | 9 | 6 | 2 |
NCAA Championships
| Gold medal – first place | 2015 Iowa City | 4×50 y freestyle |
| Gold medal – first place | 2015 Iowa City | 4×100 y medley |
| Gold medal – first place | 2016 Atlanta | 4×50 y freestyle |
| Gold medal – first place | 2016 Atlanta | 4×200 y freestyle |
| Gold medal – first place | 2016 Atlanta | 4×100 y medley |
| Gold medal – first place | 2017 Indianapolis | 200 y butterfly |
| Gold medal – first place | 2017 Indianapolis | 4×50 y freestyle |
| Gold medal – first place | 2017 Indianapolis | 4×100 y freestyle |
| Gold medal – first place | 2017 Indianapolis | 4×100 y medley |
| Silver medal – second place | 2014 Austin | 4×50 y medley |
| Silver medal – second place | 2015 Iowa City | 100 y butterfly |
| Silver medal – second place | 2015 Iowa City | 200 y butterfly |
| Silver medal – second place | 2016 Atlanta | 200 y butterfly |
| Silver medal – second place | 2016 Atlanta | 4×100 y freestyle |
| Silver medal – second place | 2017 Indianapolis | 4×200 y freestyle |
| Bronze medal – third place | 2016 Atlanta | 100 y butterfly |
| Bronze medal – third place | 2017 Indianapolis | 100 y butterfly |

John Peet Conger (born September 26, 1994) is a former American competition swimmer who specializes in butterfly and freestyle events. He is an Olympic gold medalist in the 4 × 200 m freestyle relay from the 2016 Summer Olympics in Rio de Janeiro, and the former American record-holder in the 200-yard butterfly with a best time of 1:37.35, having held this record for nearly a decade (February 25, 2015, to January 25, 2025) until Luca Urlando took 0.18 off his mark in an NCAA dual meet against the University of Tennessee.

== Early life ==
John Conger was born on September 26, 1994. Conger grew up in Rockville, Maryland where he swam for the Rockville-Montgomery Swim Club under head coach Sue Chen. In his later years, Conger attended and swam for Our Lady of Good-Counsel High School in the D.C. area. In his senior season at the 2013 Metro Championships, Conger broke the National High School Record in the 500-yard freestyle by three seconds, going 4:13.87. The former record of 4:16.39 held by Jeff Kostoff was the oldest High School Record in the books, set back in 1983. Conger is also the current National Independent High School Record Holder in the 100-yard freestyle with a time of 42.81.

== Swimming career ==
At the 2012 U.S. Open Swimming Championships in Indianapolis, Conger took silver in the 200-meter backstroke with a time of 1:58.14. At the 2012 United States Olympic Trials, Conger missed the U.S. Team by finishing 8th in the 100-meter backstroke and 5th in the 200-meter backstroke with times of 54.63 and 1:58.97, respectively. At the 2012 Junior Pan Pacific Swimming Championships, Conger broke the national age-group (NAG) record for the 17–18 age group in the 100-meter backstroke with a winning time of 54.07. He also took home two more golds in the 200-meter backstroke (1:57.20), 50-meter freestyle (22.69), and one bronze in the 100-meter freestyle (49.84).

At the 2013 Summer Universiade in Kazan, Conger, competing as an incoming freshman, won gold in the 200-meter backstroke with a time of 1:55.47, and bronze as a member of the U.S. team in the 4x100-meter medley relay. Conger also competed in the 100-meter butterfly and finished 6th in the final.

Conger accepted an athletic scholarship to attend the University of Texas at Austin, where he swam for Hall of Fame Coaches Eddie Reese and Kris Kubik's Texas Longhorns men's swimming and diving team. On February 25, 2015, Conger broke the American and US Open record in the 200-yard butterfly with a time of 1:39.31 during a time trial at the 2015 Big 12 Championships.

At the 2015 NCAA Championships, Conger won the silver in the 100 (44.55) and 200 yard butterfly (1:39.74) behind teammate Joseph Schooling. He finished 7th in the 100 yard backstroke, with a time of 45.76. Conger helped the Texas Longhorns in the 400 yard medley relay (swimming the freestyle leg and recording an anchor time of 40.96), the 800 yard freestyle relay on Day 2, and the 400 yard freestyle relay (42.17 as the 2nd leg) on Day 3.

At the 2015 U.S Nationals in San Antonio, Conger competed in the 100 and 200 meter butterfly, the 200 m backstroke, the 100 m freestyle, and the 200 meter freestyle (only in the prelims). Conger finished second to Michael Phelps in both the 100 m and 200 m butterfly, recording times of 51.33 and 1:54.54 respectively. He narrowly missed his personal best in the 100 m freestyle, going 49.05 to miss it by .03. He finished second to Caeleb Dressel in that race. Conger qualified first after prelims in the 200 m freestyle, but withdrew to focus on the 200 butterfly. In the 200 m backstroke, Conger finished in 4th place with a time of 1:58.84.

=== 2016 Summer Olympics ===
Conger represented the United States in the 2016 Olympics in Rio, having qualified in the U.S. Olympic Trials winning bronze in the 200 meter freestyle. At the Olympics, Conger swam in the heats of the 4 × 200 meter freestyle relay and secured qualification for the final with a fast last 50 meter split of 26.83. Although Conger posted the fastest split time of the American team in the heats, he was left off the team that swam the final. The team went on to win the final, also earning Conger a gold medal.

==== Gas station incident during 2016 Olympics ====
On the morning of August 14, Conger's teammate Ryan Lochte claimed that he, Conger, Gunnar Bentz, and Jimmy Feigen were robbed after four men forced them out of their taxi at gunpoint. The Brazilian authorities questioned this account, and after Lochte had flown home on August 16, Conger and Bentz were prevented from leaving the country, and their passports were seized; this was done in order to have them testify as witnesses of the incident. Civil Police of Rio de Janeiro concluded that the athletes were not robbed, but instead had been involved in an incident at a gas station in Barra da Tijuca, west of the city. The investigation found that the swimmers had stopped at a gas station near Casa França, where they were involved in a confrontation with security guards regarding vandalism. Some or all of the swimmers had caused damages to objects in a bathroom while intoxicated. It was claimed that the swimmers had already paid in cash 100 reais ($31) and $20 in U.S. currency as compensation for objects from the bathroom which were damaged, such as a soap holder, a mirror, and a "Please Do Not Enter" sign.

According to anonymous police sources, Conger and Bentz told the police that Lochte's robbery story was fabricated. The Associated Press reported that Conger and Bentz "refuted Lochte's claim that the group was held up by armed assailants". Conger confirmed the group was confronted by two armed security guards with guns, one "pointed at" Conger.

After Conger returned to the United States, in a statement he apologized and admitted the team had urinated on an alleyway wall, and wrote that Lochte removed a poster from a wall. Fellow swimmer Gunnar Bentz confirmed the swimmers had returned to a taxi but were ordered out of the taxi by two armed security men who both pointed their guns at the swimmers and commanded them to sit on the pavement before an interpreter arrived. Both Conger and Bentz's statements confirm that Lochte ripped a poster down and approached the guards, but refute witnessing any damage caused to the bathroom.

=== Post Rio de Janeiro ===
At the 2017 NCAA Championships, Conger helped lead the Longhorns to their third-straight team title. He broke the U.S. Open and American Records in the 200 fly individually, and was part of three championships relays for Texas.

== Personal bests ==
As of September 10, 2019

Long Course
| Event | Time | Meet | Date |
|---|---|---|---|
| 100 m butterfly | 51.00 | 2018 Pro Swim Series – Atlanta | March 1, 2018 |
| 200 m butterfly | 1:54.47 | 2017 U.S. Nationals | June 27, 2017 |
| 100 m backstroke | 54.04 | 2013 Summer Universiade | July 16, 2013 |
| 200 m backstroke | 1:55.47 | 2013 Summer Universiade | July 15, 2013 |
| 50 m freestyle | 22.41 | 2019 TYR Pro Series #3 - Richmond | April 12, 2019 |
| 100 m freestyle | 48.47 | 2019 Phillips 66 Nationals | July 31, 2019 |
| 200 m freestyle | 1:45.77 | 2016 U.S. Olympic Trials | June 28, 2016 |
