= SwimSwam =

American swimming news website

- Website type: Sports
- Available in: English, Spanish, German, French, Hindi, Italian
- Headquarters: Austin, Texas, United States
- Country of origin: United States
- Owners: SwimSwam Partners, LLC
- Website: swimswam.com
- Launched: March 12, 2012

SwimSwam is a swimming news organization covering competitive swimming along with diving, water polo, and synchronized swimming. SwimSwam launched as a website in March 2012.

== History ==
The news organization was founded by Braden Keith, Garrett McCaffrey, Davis Wuolle, Tiffany Stewart and Melvin Stewart. The group of founders teamed up in October 2011, started the SwimSwam YouTube channel on February 17, 2012, and launched the SwimSwam website March 12, 2012. While the website was launched in 2012, its origins trace back to swimming website SwimNetwork.com where Mel Stewart had worked as a traffic driver and blogger. The roots of the YouTube channel can also be traced to SwimNetwork.com, where in 2010 Stewart was the host of an interview show. After USA Swimming shut SwimNetwork.com down, it was launched in 2006 and shut down a few years later, Stewart took his experience and brought his wife and collaborators together to found SwimSwam.

Four years after the initial launch of the website and the start of the YouTube channel, Keith and Stewart spearheaded the launch of a print magazine taking some of the first hard copy issues to the 2016 US Olympic Trials to increase brand recognition. Headquarters at time of launch were located in Austin, Texas, though workers were spread throughout multiple states.

== Operations ==
=== Website ===
Writers publishing articles on swimswam.com are composed both of staff writers and topical contributors. Current contributors and columnists include podcaster Rich Roll and author and former national-level swimmer, Olivier Poirier-Leroy. Typically, the website publishes 20 to 100 articles per month.

The site also compiles a listing of swim-related jobs and ranks NCAA recruits and recruiting classes, among other things.

=== Magazine ===
In 2016, SwimSwam launched a quarterly print magazine called SwimSwam magazine, which was included in Mr. Magazine's "30 Hottest New Launches of the Year."
