= Austin Katz =

American swimmer (born 1999)

Personal information
- Full name: Austin Katz
- National team: United States
- Born: March 19, 1999 (age 27) Tarpon Springs, Florida, U.S.
- Height: 6 ft 2 in (188 cm)

Sport
- Sport: Swimming
- Strokes: Backstroke
- Club: Sarasota Sharks
- College team: University of Texas at Austin
- Coach: Eddie Reese
Medal record
Men's swimming
Representing the United States
Event	1st	2nd	3rd
Pan Pacific Championships	0	0	1
World University Games	1	2	0
World Junior Championships	0	0	1
Total	1	2	2
Pan Pacific Championships
Bronze medal – third place	2018 Tokyo	200 m backstroke
World University Games
Gold medal – first place	2019 Naples	200 m backstroke
Silver medal – second place	2017 Taipei	200 m backstroke
Silver medal – second place	2017 Taipei	4×200 m freestyle
World Junior Championships
Bronze medal – third place	2015 Singapore	200 m backstroke
Junior Pan Pacific Championships
Silver medal – second place	2016 Maui	200 m backstroke
Representing the Texas Longhorns
Event	1st	2nd	3rd
NCAA Championships	3	1	2
Total	3	1	2
By race
Event	1st	2nd	3rd
200 y backstroke	1	1	0
4×100 y medley	0	0	1
4×200 y freestyle	2	0	1
Total	3	1	2
NCAA Championships
Gold medal – first place	2018 Minneapolis	200 y backstroke
Gold medal – first place	2019 Austin	4×200 y freestyle
Gold medal – first place	2021 Greensboro	4×200 y freestyle
Silver medal – second place	2019 Austin	200 y backstroke
Bronze medal – third place	2018 Minneapolis	4×200 y freestyle
Bronze medal – third place	2019 Austin	4×100 y medley

Austin Katz (born March 19, 1999) is an American competitive swimmer who specializes in backstroke events. He is a World University Games gold medalist and a Pan Pacs bronze medalist. At the 2020 US Olympic Trials, Katz placed third in the 200m backstroke behind Ryan Murphy and Bryce Mefford, just missing out on an Olympic berth by one place. From 2017 to 2021, Katz swam collegiately for the University of Texas at Austin where he was a three-time NCAA champion and the current American record-holder in the 4×200-yard freestyle relay.

== See also ==
- NCAA Division I Men's Swimming and Diving Championships
- List of United States records in swimming
- Texas Longhorns swimming and diving
- Texas Longhorns
