= 2022 Australian Short Course Swimming Championships =

- Host city: Sydney, New South Wales
- Date(s): 24–27 August
- Venue(s): Sydney Olympic Park Aquatic Centre
- Events: 66 (men: 32; women: 32; mixed: 2)

The 2022 Australian Short Course Swimming Championships were held from 24 to 27 August 2022 at the Sydney Olympic Park Aquatic Centre in Sydney, New South Wales.

Racing was spread over four days of competition featuring heats in the morning and finals in the evening session. The event doubled up as the national trials for the 2022 FINA World Swimming Championships to be held in Melbourne, Victoria.

== Schedule ==
Legend
| Key | H | ½ | F | TF |
| Value | Heats | Semifinals | Final | Timed final |

M = Morning session, E = Evening session

Men
| Date → | 24 August | | 25 August | | 26 August | | 27 August | |
| Event ↓ | M | E | M | E | M | E | M | E |
|---|---|---|---|---|---|---|---|---|
| 50 m freestyle | | | | | | | H | F |
| 100 m freestyle | | | H | F | | | | |
| 200 m freestyle | H | F | | | | | | |
| 400 m freestyle | | | | | H | F | | |
| 800 m freestyle | TF | TF | | | | | | |
| 1500 m freestyle | | | | | | | TF | TF |
| 50 m backstroke | | | | | H | F | | |
| 100 m backstroke | H | F | | | | | | |
| 200 m backstroke | | | H | F | | | | |
| 50 m breaststroke | | | H | F | | | | |
| 100 m breaststroke | H | F | | | | | | |
| 200 m breaststroke | | | | | | | H | F |
| 50 m butterfly | H | F | | | | | | |
| 100 m butterfly | | | | | H | F | | |
| 200 m butterfly | | | H | F | | | | |
| 100 m individual medley | | | | | | | H | F |
| 200 m individual medley | | | | | H | F | | |
| 400 m individual medley | | | H | F | | | | |
| 4 × 100 metre freestyle relay | | | | | | TF | | |
| 4 × 200 metre freestyle relay | | | | | TF | | | |
| 4 × 100 metre medley relay | | | | | | | | TF |

Men Multi-Class
| Date → | 24 August | | 25 August | | 26 August | | 27 August | |
| Event ↓ | M | E | M | E | M | E | M | E |
|---|---|---|---|---|---|---|---|---|
| 50 m freestyle | | | H | F | | | | |
| 100 m freestyle | | | | | H | F | | |
| 200 m freestyle | H | F | | | | | | |
| 400 m freestyle | H | F | | | | | | |
| 50 m backstroke | | | | | | | H | F |
| 100 m backstroke | | | H | F | | | | |
| 50 m breaststroke | | | H | F | | | | |
| 100 m breaststroke | | | | | | | H | F |
| 50 m butterfly | H | F | | | | | | |
| 100 m butterfly | | | | | | | H | F |
| 200 m individual medley | | | | | H | F | | |

Mixed
| Date → | 24 August | | 25 August | | 26 August | | 27 August | |
| Event ↓ | M | E | M | E | M | E | M | E |
|---|---|---|---|---|---|---|---|---|
| 4 × 50 metre medley relay | | | | TF | | | | |
| 4 × 50 metre medley relay | | TF | | | | | | |

Women
| Date → | 24 August | | 25 August | | 26 August | | 27 August | |
| Event ↓ | M | E | M | E | M | E | M | E |
|---|---|---|---|---|---|---|---|---|
| 50 m freestyle | | | | | | | H | F |
| 100 m freestyle | | | H | F | | | | |
| 200 m freestyle | H | F | | | | | | |
| 400 m freestyle | | | | | H | F | | |
| 800 m freestyle | | | | | | | TF | TF |
| 1500 m freestyle | TF | TF | | | | | | |
| 50 m backstroke | | | | | H | F | | |
| 100 m backstroke | H | F | | | | | | |
| 200 m backstroke | | | H | F | | | | |
| 50 m breaststroke | | | H | F | | | | |
| 100 m breaststroke | H | F | | | | | | |
| 200 m breaststroke | | | | | | | H | F |
| 50 m butterfly | H | F | | | | | | |
| 100 m butterfly | | | | | H | F | | |
| 200 m butterfly | | | H | F | | | | |
| 100 m individual medley | | | | | | | H | F |
| 200 m individual medley | | | | | H | F | | |
| 400 m individual medley | | | H | F | | | | |
| 4 × 100 metre freestyle relay | | | | | | TF | | |
| 4 × 200 metre freestyle relay | | | | | TF | | | |
| 4 × 100 metre medley relay | | | | | | | | TF |

Women Multi-Class
| Date → | 24 August | | 25 August | | 26 August | | 27 August | |
| Event ↓ | M | E | M | E | M | E | M | E |
|---|---|---|---|---|---|---|---|---|
| 50 m freestyle | | | H | F | | | | |
| 100 m freestyle | | | | | H | F | | |
| 200 m freestyle | H | F | | | | | | |
| 400 m freestyle | H | F | | | | | | |
| 50 m backstroke | | | | | | | H | F |
| 100 m backstroke | | | H | F | | | | |
| 50 m breaststroke | | | H | F | | | | |
| 100 m breaststroke | | | | | | | H | F |
| 50 m butterfly | H | F | | | | | | |
| 100 m butterfly | | | | | | | H | F |
| 200 m individual medley | | | | | H | F | | |

== Medal winners ==
The medallist for the open events are below.

=== Men's events ===
| Event | Gold | | Silver | | Bronze | |
|---|---|---|---|---|---|---|
| 50 metre freestyle | Kyle Chalmers; Marion (SA) | 21.06 | Justin Ress; United States | 21.29 | Grayson Bell; Somerset (Qld) | 21.36 |
| 100 metre freestyle | Kyle Chalmers; Marion (SA) | 45.55 MR, ACR | Justin Ress; United States | 46.57 | Matthew Temple; Marion (SA) | 46.80 |
| 200 metre freestyle | Kyle Chalmers; Marion (SA) | 1:40.98 | Luke Hobson; United States | 1:41.69 | Grant House; United States | 1:42.50 |
| 400 metre freestyle | Luke Hobson; United States | 3:35.67 | Mack Horton; Griffith University (Qld) | 3:37.94 | Thomas Neill; Rackley (Qld) | 3:38.24 |
| 800 metre freestyle | David Johnston; United States | 7:30.41 AM | Mack Horton; Griffith University (Qld) | 7:39.71 | Alexander Grant; Miami (Qld) | 7:40.18 |
| 1500 metre freestyle | David Johnston; United States | 14:22.77 | Stuart Swinburn; City of Sydney (NSW) | 14:47.96 | Matthew Galea; SOPAC (NSW) | 14.49.90 |
| 50 metre backstroke | Justin Ress; United States | 23.16 | Isaac Cooper; Bundaberg (Qld) | 23.31 | Mark Nikolaev; Russia | 23.34 |
| 100 metre backstroke | Mark Nikolaev; Russia | 49.73 | Bradley Woodward; Mingara (NSW) | 51.10 | Isaac Cooper; Bundaberg (Qld) | 51.42 |
| 200 metre backstroke | Bradley Woodward; Mingara (NSW) | 1:51.14 | Ty Hartwell; Chandler (Qld) | 1:51.28 | Stuart Swinburn; City of Sydney (NSW) | 1:52.29 |
| 50 metre breaststroke | Samuel Williamson; Melbourne Vicentre (Vic) | 26.27 MR, ACR | Grayson Bell; Somerset (Qld) | 26.45 | James Mckechnie; STARplex (SA) | 26.91 |
| 100 metre breaststroke | Samuel Williamson; Melbourne Vicentre (Vic) | 57.01 | Joshua Yong; USC Spartans (Qld) | 57.63 | Nash Wilkes; Southport (QLD) | 58.59 |
| 200 metre breaststroke | Samuel Williamson; Melbourne Vicentre (Vic) | 2:07.11 | David Schlicht; MLC Aquatic (Vic) | 2:07.79 | Yannik Zwolsman; Southport (Qld) | 2:08.01 |
| 50 metre butterfly | Matthew Temple; Marion (SA) | 22.70 | Alex Quach; Mounties (NSW) | 22.85 | David Morgan; Miami (Qld) | 22.92 |
| 100 metre butterfly | Matthew Temple; Marion (SA) | 50.09 | Trenton Julian; United States | 50.22 | Shaun Champion; Abbotsleigh (NSW) | 50.31 |
| 200 metre butterfly | Trenton Julian; United States | 1:50.71 ACR | David Morgan; Miami (Qld) | 1:54.40 | Lucas Humeniuk; Chandler (Qld) | 1:55.03 |
| 100 metre individual medley | Grant House; United States | 51.73 | Cody Simpson; Griffith University (Qld) | 52.67 | Trenton Julian; United States | 52.76 |
| 200 metre individual medley | Clyde Lewis; Griffith University (Qld) | 1:53.01 | Grant House; United States | 1:53.05 | Se-Bom Lee; Carlile (Qld) | 1:53.83 |
| 400 metre individual medley | Brendon Smith; Griffith University (Qld) | 4:01.11 | David Schlicht; MLC Aquatic (Vic) | 4:01.44 | David Johnston; United States | 4:02.84 |
| 4 × 100 metre freestyle relay | Chandler A (Qld); Harrison Turner (49.39); Samuel Altoft (48.85); Ty Hartwell (49.42); Dylan Andrea (48.14) | 3:15.80 | Nunawading A (Vic); Elliot Rogerson (48.85); Nicholas Wu (49.65); Silas Harris (49.50); Samuel Keenan (51.38) | 3:19.38 | University of Queensland A (Qld); Liam McGowan (50.72); Jye Cornwell (48.71); Lachlan Miller (51.12); Jack Ireland (51.32) | 3:21.87 |
| 4 × 200 metre freestyle relay | University of Sydney A (NSW); James Koch (1:46.66); Thomas Hay (1:47.96); Cormac Guthrie (1:51.02); Ryan Wilkes (1:48.26) | 7:13.90 | Nunawading A (Vic); Nicholas Wu (1:51.05); Jack Gurrie (1:51.93); Elliot Rogerson (1:46.98); Silas Harris (1:49.63) | 7:19.59 | Narrabeen A (NSW); Koby Bujak-Upton (1:49.97); Luke Bibby (1:51.31); Cooper Phillips (1:53.95); Noah Charles (1:56.51) | 7:31.74 |
| 4 × 100 metre medley relay | Chandler A (Qld); Ty Hartwell (51.78); Zac Stubblety-Cook (58.08); Lucas Humeniuk (52.63); Dylan Andrea (48.36) | 3:30.85 | Chandler B (Qld); James Bayliss (53.21); Finlay Schuster (1:01.14); Harrison Turner (52.83); Samuel Altoft (48.39) | 3:35.57 | Knox Pymble A (NSW); Joseph Hamson (53.29); Angus Menzies (59.63); Kai Lilienthal (54.36); Gabriel Gorgas (48.53) | 3:35.81 |

=== Men's multi-class events ===
| Event | Gold | | Silver | | Bronze | |
|---|---|---|---|---|---|---|
| 50 metre freestyle | Jack Ireland S14; University of Queensland (Qld) | 23.85 WR | Dylan Logan S15; Geelong (Vic) | 24.09 | Jarred Dyer S14; Wollongong (NSW) | 25.69 |
| 100 metre freestyle | Jack Ireland S14; University of Queensland (Qld) | 51.28 | Jake Michel S14; Carina Leagues CJ's (Qld) | 53.99 | Dylan Logan S15; Geelong (Vic) | 53.15 |
| 200 metre freestyle | Jack Ireland S14; University of Queensland (Qld) | 1:52.49 | Ricky Betar S14; Cruiz (ACT) | 1:52.95 | Alexander Tuckfield S10; SLC Aquadot (NSW) | 1:59.48 |
| 400 metre freestyle | Alexander Tuckfield S10; SLC Aquadot (NSW) | 4:05.98 | Joshua Alford S14; University of Queensland (Qld) | 4:22.58 | Alex Saffy S10; Bunbury (WA) | 4:27.80 |
| 50 metre backstroke | Jarred Dyer S14; Wollongong (NSW) | 30.00 | Joshua Alford S14; University of Queensland (Qld) | 30.14 | Declan Budd S14; Knox Pymble (NSW) | 30.95 |
| 100 metre backstroke | Ricky Betar S14; Cruiz (ACT) | 58.28 | Joshua Alford S14; University of Queensland (Qld) | 1:04.64 | Jarred Dyer S14; Wollongong (NSW) | 1:05.38 |
| 50 metre breaststroke | Oscar Stubbs S13; SOPAC (NSW) | 33.23 | Zhi Wei Wong S13; Singapore | 33.30 | Samuel Gould S14; Helensvale (Qld) | 32.89 |
| 100 metre breaststroke | Jake Michel S14; Carina Leagues CJ's (Qld) | 1:02.79 WR | Lachlan Hanratty S14; Revesby Workers (NSW) | 1:14.15 | Samuel Gould S14; Helensvale (Qld) | 1:14.41 |
| 50 metre butterfly | Jarred Dyer S14; Wollongong (NSW) | 27.45 | Joshua Alford S14; University of Queensland (Qld) | 27.68 | Dylan Logan S15; Geelong (Vic) | 25.72 |
| 100 metre butterfly | Ricky Betar S14; Cruiz (ACT) | 56.96 | Bailey Stewart S14; University of Queensland (Qld) | 1:01.45 | Alex Saffy S10; Bunbury (WA) | 59.09 |
| 200 metre individual medley | Joshua Alford S14; University of Queensland (Qld) | 2:21.60 | Darren Sisman S14; Sans Souci (NSW) | 2:22.12 | Samuel Gould S14; Helensvale (Qld) | 2:23.35 |

=== Women's events ===
| Event | Gold | | Silver | | Bronze | |
|---|---|---|---|---|---|---|
| 50 metre freestyle | Emma McKeon; Griffith University (Qld) | 23.61 | Meg Harris; Marion (SA) | 23.84 | Madison Wilson; Marion (SA) | 23.99 |
| 100 metre freestyle | Emma McKeon; Griffith University (Qld) | 51.03 | Madison Wilson; Marion (SA) | 51.40 | Mollie O'Callaghan; St Peters Western (Qld) | 51.50 |
| 200 metre freestyle | Madison Wilson; Marion (SA) | 1:52.55 | Leah Neale; Chandler (Qld) | 1:53.22 | Lani Pallister; Griffith University (Qld) | 1:53.81 |
| 400 metre freestyle | Lani Pallister; Griffith University (Qld) | 3:56.74 | Leah Neale; Chandler (Qld) | 4:02.25 | Jacinta Essam; Ginninderra (ACT) | 4:12.08 |
| 800 metre freestyle | Lani Pallister; Griffith University (Qld) | 8:07.73 MR, ACR | Jacinta Essam; Ginninderra (ACT) | 8:33.50 | Jacqueline Davison-McGovern; Yeronga Park (Qld) | 8:44.85 |
| 1500 metre freestyle | Lani Pallister; Griffith University (Qld) | 15:24.63 MR, ACR | Jacqueline Davison-McGovern; Yeronga Park (Qld) | 16:35.06 | Sienna Deurloo; Toowoomba Grammar (Qld) | 16:52.04 |
| 50 metre backstroke | Minna Atherton; Bond (Qld) | 26.68 | Holly Barratt; Rockingham (WA) | 27.02 | Tahlia Thornton; USC Spartans (Qld) | 27.33 |
| 100 metre backstroke | Beata Nelson; United States | 55.74 | Kaylee McKeown; Griffith University (Qld) | 55.81 | Mollie O'Callaghan; St Peters Western (Qld) | 56.02 |
| 200 metre backstroke | Kaylee McKeown; Griffith University (Qld) | 1:59.48 | Beata Nelson; United States | 2:02.73 | Minna Atherton; Bond (Qld) | 2:03.62 |
| 50 metre breaststroke | Chelsea Hodges; Southport (Qld) | 29.99 | Talara-Jade Dixon; St Hilda's (WA) | 30.07 | Jenna Strauch; Miami (Qld) | 30.55 |
| 100 metre breaststroke | Chelsea Hodges; Southport (Qld) | 1:04.78 | Jenna Strauch; Miami (Qld) | 1:05.20 | Talara-Jade Dixon; St Hilda's (WA) | 1:05.30 |
| 200 metre breaststroke | Jenna Strauch; Miami (Qld) | 2:21.57 | Mikayla Smith; Miami (Qld) | 2:21.97 | Ashleigh Oberekar; Valley Aquatic (NSW) | 2:22.82 |
| 50 metre butterfly | Alexandria Perkins; USC Spartans (Qld) | 25.52 | Beata Nelson; United States | 25.66 | Holly Barratt; Rockingham (WA) | 25.80 |
| 100 metre butterfly | Alexandria Perkins; USC Spartans (Qld) | 56.89 | Brittany Castelluzzo; Tea Tree Gully (SA) | 57.18 | Laura Taylor; Bond (Qld) | 57.98 |
| 200 metre butterfly | Elizabeth Dekkers; Newmarket Racers (Qld) | 2:05.65 | Laura Taylor; Bond (Qld) | 2:05.91 | Brittany Castelluzzo; Tea Tree Gully (SA) | 2:06.46 |
| 100 metre individual medley | Beata Nelson; United States | 58.14 | Kayla Hardy; Cruiz (ACT) | 1:00.67 | Mia O'Leary; Bond (Qld) | 1:00.80 |
| 200 metre individual medley | Beata Nelson; United States | 2:05.38 | Kayla Hardy; Cruiz (ACT) | 2:09.69 | Lucy Dring; Sunshine Coast Grammar (Qld) | 2:10.87 |
| 400 metre individual medley | Kayla Hardy; Cruiz (ACT) | 4:32.84 | Emilie Muir; Griffith University (Qld) | 4:33.84 | Jacinta Essam; Ginninderra (ACT) | 4:37.26 |
| 4 × 100 metre freestyle relay | Knox Pymble A (NSW); Paris Zhang (56.29); Claudia Fydler (56.66); Jaya Lilienthal (58.29); Bella Zhang (55.68) | 3:46.92 | Manly A (NSW); Georgina Seton (57.61); Emily Ryan (57.60); Madeline Davis (58.97); Lillie Mcpherson (56.78) | 3:50.96 | Revesby Workers A (NSW); Kirrily Edwards (57.81); Abbey Connor (56.38); Emily Maythers (58.93); Kate Edwards (57.99) | 3:51.11 |
| 4 × 200 metre freestyle relay | Revesby Workers A (NSW); Kirrily Edwards (2:02.41); Rafaela Kopellou (2:06.43); Kate Edwards (2:06.83); Abbey Connor (2:02.08) | 8:17.75 | Warringah A (NSW); Zara Kasprowicz (2:07.13); Macy Beuzeville (2:07.39); Indie Smith (2:06.47); Dominique Melbourn (2:07.43) | 8:28.42 | Narrabeen A (NSW); Lexi Harrison (2:03.80); Zannah Dixon (2:10.34); Dominika Kralka (2:10.25); Violet Walton (2:10.70) | 8:35.09 |

=== Women's multi-class events ===
| Event | Gold | | Silver | | Bronze | |
|---|---|---|---|---|---|---|
| 50 metre freestyle | Alexa Leary S9; St Hilda's (Qld) | 28.09 | Yasmine-Bella Younes S14; Bankstown Sports (NSW) | 29.16 | Kael Thompson S14; Sunshine Coast Grammar (Qld) | 29.33 |
| 100 metre freestyle | Alexa Leary S9; St Hilda's (Qld) | 59.71 WR | Katja Dedekind S13; Yeronga Park (Qld) | 57.84 WR | Hannah Price S9; Campbelltown (NSW) | 1:06.86 |
| 200 metre freestyle | Pin Xui Yip S2; Singapore | 4:57.81 | Alexa Leary S9; St Hilda's (Qld) | 2:09.66 | Jade Lucy S14; SLC Aquadot (NSW) | 2:18.03 |
| 400 metre freestyle | Holly Warn S7; St Hilda's (Qld) | 5:28.66 | Hannah Price S9; Campbelltown (NSW) | 4:59.77 | Chloe Osborn S7; Aquablitz Toongabbie (NSW) | 5:36.79 |
| 50 metre backstroke | Pin Xui Yip S2; Singapore | 1:08.08 | Kael Thompson S14; Sunshine Coast Grammar (Qld) | 32.66 | Hannah Price S9; Campbelltown (NSW) | 34.32 |
| 100 metre backstroke | Pin Xui Yip S2; Singapore | 2:20.57 | Katja Dedekind S13; Yeronga Park (Qld) | 1:03.59 WR | Hannah Price S9; Campbelltown (NSW) | 1:12.83 |
| 50 metre breaststroke | Maddison Hinds S14; Hornsby (NSW) | 38.91 | Tegan Reder S11; UWA West Coast (WA) | 43.23 | Nicole Taylor S15; Griffith (NSW) | 37.64 |
| 100 metre breaststroke | Tegan Reder S11; UWA West Coast (WA) | 1:33.20 | Stephanie Bruzzese S14; Trinity Grammar (Vic) | 1:23.92 | Maddison Hinds S14; Hornsby (NSW) | 1:23.93 |
| 50 metre butterfly | Yasmine-Bella Younes S14; Bankstown Sports (NSW) | 31.87 | Montana Atkinson S14; Helensvale (Qld) | 32.13 | Yan Ting Danielle Moi S14; Singapore | 32.99 |
| 100 metre butterfly | Yasmine-Bella Younes S14; Bankstown Sports (NSW) | 1:11.20 | Montana Atkinson S14; Helensvale (Qld) | 1:12.38 | Maddison Hinds S14; Hornsby (NSW) | 1:13.36 |
| 200 metre individual medley | Hannah Price S9; Campbelltown (NSW) | 2:41.14 | Nicole Taylor S15; Griffith (NSW) | 2:38.55 | Maddison Hinds S14; Hornsby (NSW) | 2:37.59 |

=== Mixed events ===
| Event | Gold | | Silver | | Bronze | |
|---|---|---|---|---|---|---|
| 4 × 50 metre freestyle relay | Manly A (NSW); Cameron McEvoy (21.59); Joshua Kerr (22.87); Lillie Mcpherson (25.74); Georgina Seton (25.55) | 1:35.75 | Knox Pymble A (NSW); Kai Lilienthal (23.25); Joseph Hamson (21.99); Bella Zhang (25.70); Paris Zhang (25.36) | 1:36.30 | University of Queensland A (Qld); Liam McGowan (23.06); Lachlan Miller (22.82); Chelsea Mailer (26.52); Brooke Napper (25.16) | 1:37.56 |
| 4 × 50 metre medley relay | Knox Pymble A (NSW); Joseph Hamson (24.88); Angus Menzies (27.46); Claudia Fydler (26.99); Paris Zhang (25.55) | 1:44.88 | University of Queensland A (Qld); Jye Cornwell (24.45); Alexander Bibo (28.31); Brooke Napper (25.91); Chelsea Mailer (26.44) | 1:45.11 | Cruiz A (ACT); Meg Senior (29.43); Thomas Ikotin (29.08); Kayla Hardy (26.54); Thomas Robinson (21.90) | 1:46.95 |

Legend: WR – World record; CR – Commonwealth record; OR – Oceanian record; AR – Australian record; ACR – Australian All Comers record; Club – Australian Club record; MR – Meet record

== Club points scores ==
The final club point scores are below. Only the top ten clubs are listed.

Overall club point score
| Rank | Club | State | Points |
|---|---|---|---|
| 1 | Griffith University | Qld | 871 |
| 2 | University of Queensland | Qld | |
| 3 | Knox Pymble | NSW | |
| 4 | | | |
| 5 | | | |
| 6 | | | |
| 7 | | | |
| 8 | | | |
| 9 | | | |
| 10 | | | |
