= 2018 NCAA Division I Men's Swimming and Diving Championships =

American college aquatic sports competition

2018 NCAA Division I Swimming and Diving Championships
- Host city: Minneapolis, Minnesota
- Date: March 21–24, 2018
- Venue(s): Jean K. Freeman Aquatic Center; University of Minnesota

The 2018 NCAA Division I Men's Swimming and Diving Championships were contested from March 21–24, 2018 at the Jean K. Freeman Aquatic Center at University of Minnesota in Minneapolis, Minnesota at the 95th annual NCAA-sanctioned swim meet to determine the team and individual national champions of Division I men's collegiate swimming and diving in the United States.

== Team standings ==
- Note: Top 10 only
- (H) = Hosts
- ^{(DC)} = Defending champions
- Italics = Debut finish in the Top 10
- Full results

Rank	Team	Points
1st place, gold medalist(s)	Texas ^{(DC)}	449
2nd place, silver medalist(s)	California	437.5
3rd place, bronze medalist(s)	Indiana	422
4	NC State	385
5	Florida	347
6	USC	253
7	Stanford	205
8	Michigan	168.5
9	Louisville	156
10	Georgia	129

== Swimming results ==
Full results

Event	Gold		Silver		Bronze	
50 freestyle	Caeleb Dressel; Florida	17.63; US, AR	Ryan Held; NC State	18.64	Bowe Becker; Minnesota	18.90
100 freestyle	Caeleb Dressel; Florida	39.90; US, AR	Ryan Held; NC State	41.08	Justin Ress; NC State	41.49
200 freestyle	Townley Haas; Texas	1:29.50; US, AR	Blake Pieroni; Indiana	1:30.23	Zach Apple; Auburn	1:31.18
500 freestyle	Townley Haas; Texas	4:08.60	Felix Auboeck; Michigan	4:09.03	Anton Ipsen; NC State	4:09.13
1650 freestyle	Anton Ipsen; NC State	14:24.43	Felix Auboeck; Michigan	14:29.42	Nick Norman; California	14:30.82
100 backstroke	Coleman Stewart; NC State	44.58	John Shebat; Texas	44.59	Andreas Vazaios; NC State	44.81
200 backstroke	Austin Katz; Texas	1:37.53	John Shebat; Texas	1:37.94	Patrick Mulcare; USC	1:38.43
100 breaststroke	Ian Finnerty; Indiana	49.69; US, AR	Connor Hoppe; California	51.16	Carsten Vissering; USC	51.28
200 breaststroke	Ian Finnerty; Indiana	1:50.17	Andrew Seliskar; California	1:50.42	Mark Szaranek; Florida	1:51.71
100 butterfly	Caeleb Dressel; Florida	42.80; US, AR	Jan Świtkowski; Florida	44.49	Vini Lanza; Indiana	44.50
200 butterfly	Andreas Vazaios; NC State	1:38.60	Jan Świtkowski; Florida	1:39.55	Vini Lanza; Indiana	1:39.75
200 IM	Jan Świtkowski; Florida	1:39.54	Andreas Vazaios; NC State	1:39.97	Mark Szaranek; Florida	1:40.27
400 IM	Abrahm DeVine; Stanford	3:35.29	Nick Thorne; Arizona	3:38.56	Andrew Seliskar; California	3:38.73
200 freestyle relay	Florida; Caeleb Dressel (17.81) US, AR; Jan Świtkowski (18.52); Enzo Martinez (19.00); Mark Szaranek (19.06)	1:14.39	NC State; Ryan Held (18.56); Justin Ress (18.31); Jacob Molacek (18.67); Coleman Stewart (18.96)	1:14.50; AR	California; Justin Lynch (19.05); Pawel Sendyk (18.56); Ryan Hoffer (18.36); Michael Jensen (18.59)	1:14.56
400 freestyle relay	NC State; Ryan Held (41.05); Justin Ress (40.62); Jacob Molacek (41.02); Coleman Stewart (41.62)	2:44.31; US, AR	Florida; Khader Baqlah (42.28); Jan Świtkowski (41.25); Caeleb Dressel (40.25); Mark Szaranek (41.95)	2:45.73	California; Justin Lynch (41.97); Andrew Seliskar (41.25); Ryan Hoffer (41.19); Michael Jensen (41.54)	2:46.54
800 freestyle relay	NC State; Andreas Vazaios (1:31.32); Ryan Held (1:31.09); Jacob Molacek (1:32.13); Justin Ress (1:30.77)	6:05.31; US	Indiana; Blake Pieroni (1:29.63) US, AR; Mohamed Samy (1:31.94); Vini Lanza (1:32.23); Ian Finnerty (1:32.21)	6:06.01	Texas; Townley Haas (1:30.41); Jeff Newkirk (1:32.58); Jonathan Roberts (1:32.36); Austin Katz (1:32.24)	6:07.59; AR
200 medley relay	USC; Robert Glință (21.15); Carsten Vissering (22.58); Dylan Carter (19.60); Santo Condorelli (18.49)	1:21.82	California; Daniel Carr (20.85); Connor Hoppe (23.01); Justin Lynch (19.77); Ryan Hoffer (18.25)	1:21.88; AR	Florida; Michael Taylor (21.03); Chandler Bray (23.83); Mark Szaranek (20.10); Caeleb Dressel (17.37)	1:22.33
400 medley relay	Indiana; Gabriel Fantoni (45.59); Ian Finnerty (50.33); Vini Lanza (44.53); Blake Pieroni (40.62)	3:01.07	NC State; Coleman Stewart (44.74); Jacob Molacek (52.32); Ryan Held (43.88); Justin Ress (40.82)	3:01.76	USC; Ralf Tribuntsov (45.01); Carsten Vissering (50.90); Dylan Carter (44.71); Santo Condorelli (41.21)	3:01.83

Legend: US – U.S. Open record; AR – American record;

== Diving Results ==
Event	Gold		Silver		Bronze	
1 m diving	Michael Hixon; Indiana	464.40	Steele Johnson; Purdue	443.85	James Connor; Indiana	440.55
3 m diving	Steele Johnson; Purdue	499.35	Zhipeng "Colin" Zeng; Tennessee	495.15	Michael Hixon; Indiana	481.90
Platform diving	Zhipeng "Colin" Zeng; Tennessee	466.35	Jordan Windle; Texas	460.45	Andrew Capobianco; Indiana	435.30

== See also ==
- List of college swimming and diving teams
