= 2021 International Swimming League =

- League: International Swimming League
- Sport: Swimming
- Duration: 26 August – 4 December 2021
- Teams: 10

Regular season
- Season champions: (France) Energy Standard
- Season MVP: (Japan) Daiya Seto (Tokyo Frog Kings)

Final Match
- Champions: (France) Energy Standard
- Finals MVP: (Sweden) Sarah Sjöström (Energy Standard)

Seasons
- 2020

The 2021 International Swimming League was the third and final edition of the International Swimming League, a professional swimming league, established in 2019. It comprised ten teams composed of both women and men. The league, due to COVID-19 pandemic travel restrictions, consisted of a total of eighteen short course swimming meets, called matches, spanning four stages of competition and held in two locations. In each match, swimmers from four different teams competed in individual, relay, and skins events. The ten regular season matches and one play in match took place in the city of Naples, Italy. The six play off matches in the semifinals stage of competition took place in the city of Eindhoven, Netherlands, as did the final match.

The France-based Energy Standard won the Final Match, with the Most Valuable Player award going to Sarah Sjöström of the same team.

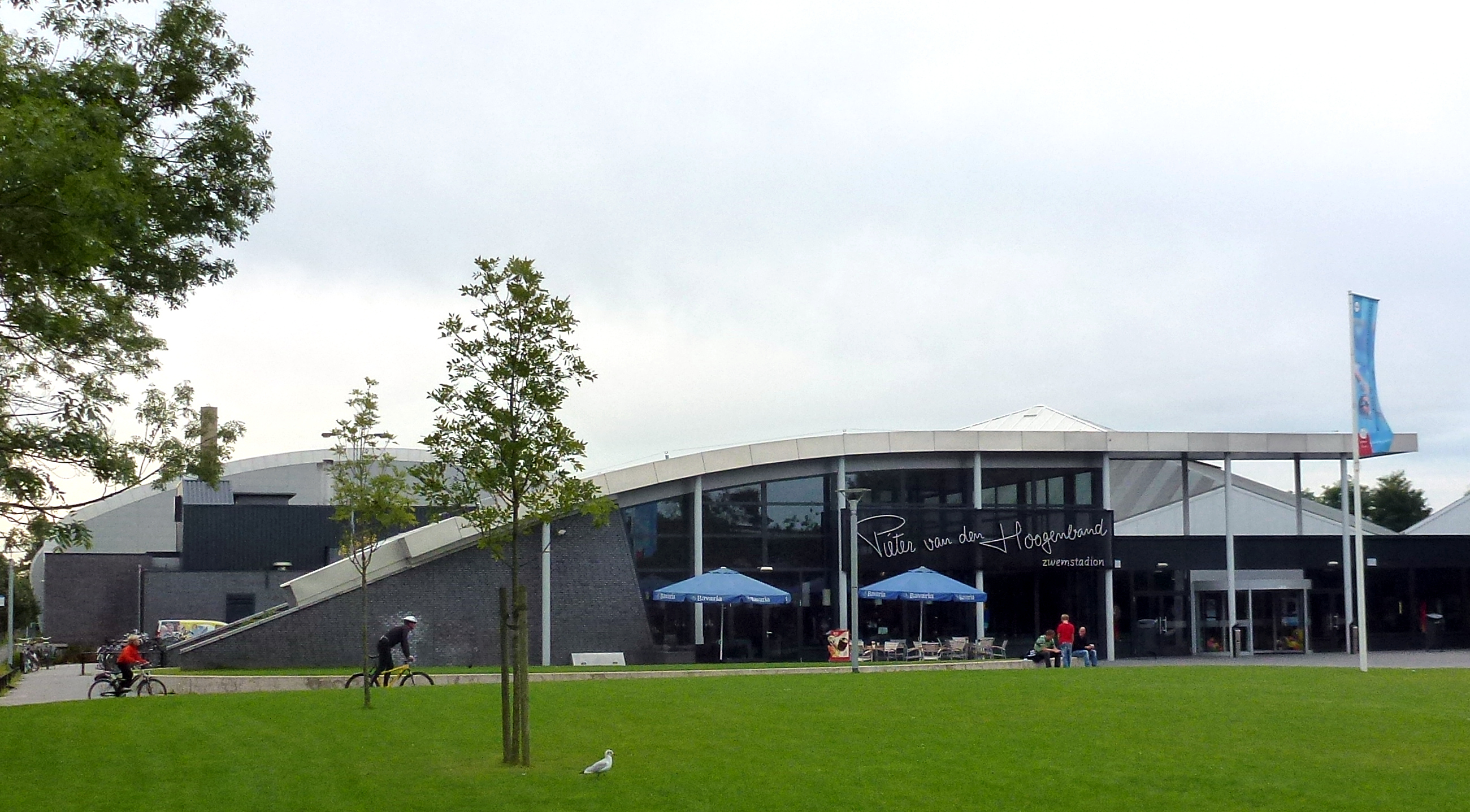
Pieter van den Hoogenband Zwemstadion, Semifinals and Final venue in Eindhoven.

== Schedule ==
The schedule consisted of eleven regular season and play in meets in Naples, followed by six Semifinals and the Final Match in Eindhoven.

| Dates | Location | Venue | Teams | Results | MVP |
Regular season
| 26–27 August | (Italy) Naples | Piscina Felice Scandone | (France) Energy Standard (Canada) Toronto Titans (United States) DC Trident (Italy) Aqua Centurions | | (Sweden) Sarah Sjöström ( (France) Energy Standard); 60.5 pts |
| 28–29 August | (Italy) Naples | Piscina Felice Scandone | (United States) Cali Condors (United States) LA Current (Japan) Tokyo Frog Kings (United States) New York Breakers | | (United States) Coleman Stewart ( (United States) Cali Condors); 95 pts |
| 2-3 September | (Italy) Naples | Piscina Felice Scandone | (France) Energy Standard (United Kingdom) London Roar (Hungary) Team Iron (United States) New York Breakers | | (Hong Kong) Siobhán Haughey ( (France) Energy Standard); 78 pts |
| 4–5 September | (Italy) Naples | Piscina Felice Scandone | (United States) Cali Condors (United States) LA Current (United States) DC Trident (Italy) Aqua Centurions | | (United States) Caeleb Dressel ( (United States) Cali Condors); 112.5 pts |
| 9-10 September | (Italy) Naples | Piscina Felice Scandone | (United States) LA Current (Hungary) Team Iron (Canada) Toronto Titans (United States) DC Trident | | (Sweden) Louise Hansson ( (Canada) Toronto Titans); 57.5 pts |
| 11–12 September | (Italy) Naples | Piscina Felice Scandone | (United States) Cali Condors (United Kingdom) London Roar (Japan) Tokyo Frog Kings (Italy) Aqua Centurions | | (Japan) Daiya Seto ( (Japan) Tokyo Frog Kings); 57 pts |
| 16-17 September | (Italy) Naples | Piscina Felice Scandone | (United States) Cali Condors (Hungary) Team Iron (Canada) Toronto Titans (United States) New York Breakers | | (United States) Beata Nelson ( (United States) Cali Condors); 67 pts |
| 18–19 September | (Italy) Naples | Piscina Felice Scandone | (France) Energy Standard (United Kingdom) London Roar (United States) LA Current (Japan) Tokyo Frog Kings | | (Belarus) Ilya Shymanovich ( (France) Energy Standard); 64 pts |
| 23-24 September | (Italy) Naples | Piscina Felice Scandone | (France) Energy Standard (United Kingdom) London Roar (Canada) Toronto Titans (United States) DC Trident | | (Russia) Evgeny Rylov ( (France) Energy Standard); 60.5 pts |
| 25-26 September | (Italy) Naples | Piscina Felice Scandone | (Hungary) Team Iron (Japan) Tokyo Frog Kings (United States) New York Breakers (Italy) Aqua Centurions | | (Japan) Daiya Seto ( (Japan) Tokyo Frog Kings); 50 pts |
Play in Match
| 29-30 September | (Italy) Naples | Piscina Felice Scandone | (Hungary) Team Iron (United States) DC Trident (Japan) Tokyo Frog Kings (United States) New York Breakers | | (Netherlands) Ranomi Kromowidjojo ( (Hungary) Team Iron); 43.5 pts |
Playoff – Semifinals
| 11-12 November | (Netherlands) Eindhoven | Pieter van den Hoogenband Zwemstadion | (France) Energy Standard (United States) DC Trident (United States) Cali Condors (Hungary) Team Iron | | (Belarus) Ilya Shymanovich ( (France) Energy Standard); 62.5 pts |
| 13-14 November | (Netherlands) Eindhoven | Pieter van den Hoogenband Zwemstadion | (Italy) Aqua Centurions (United Kingdom) London Roar (United States) LA Current (Canada) Toronto Titans | | (United States) Ryan Murphy ( (United States) LA Current); 58 pts |
| 18-19 November | (Netherlands) Eindhoven | Pieter van den Hoogenband Zwemstadion | (Italy) Aqua Centurions (United States) DC Trident (France) Energy Standard (Canada) Toronto Titans | | (Sweden) Sarah Sjöström ( (France) Energy Standard); 87.5 pts |
| 20-21 November | (Netherlands) Eindhoven | Pieter van den Hoogenband Zwemstadion | (United States) Cali Condors (Hungary) Team Iron (United States) LA Current (United Kingdom) London Roar | | (United Kingdom) Duncan Scott ( (United Kingdom) London Roar); 60 pts |
| 25-26 November | (Netherlands) Eindhoven | Pieter van den Hoogenband Zwemstadion | (United States) DC Trident (France) Energy Standard (United States) LA Current (United Kingdom) London Roar | | (Belarus) Ilya Shymanovich ( (France) Energy Standard); 83.5 pts |
| 27-28 November | (Netherlands) Eindhoven | Pieter van den Hoogenband Zwemstadion | (Italy) Aqua Centurions (United States) Cali Condors (Hungary) Team Iron (Canada) Toronto Titans | | (Italy) Matteo Rivolta ( (Italy) Aqua Centurions); 55 pts |
Final Match
| 3-4 December | (Netherlands) Eindhoven | Pieter van den Hoogenband Zwemstadion | (United States) Cali Condors (France) Energy Standard (United States) LA Current (United Kingdom) London Roar | | (Sweden) Sarah Sjöström ( (France) Energy Standard); 61 pts |

== Ranking ==
All individual events that were competed during the ISL season were ranked. Each ISL athlete had a ranking for the event(s) in which they competed, and each athlete was either awarded a "gem" or a "star" based on their rankings.

== Teams ==
ISL teams were allowed a maximum roster size of 38 athletes for the 2021 season, with a suggested size of each club's traveling roster of 30 (15 men and 15 women). Each club had a captain and a vice-captain of different gender.

(United States) Cali Condors
| Men | Women |
|---|---|
| (Jordan) Khader Baqlah | (United States) Erika Brown |
| (Poland) Marcin Cieślak | (United States) Kelsi Dahlia |
| (United States) Kevin Cordes | (Netherlands) Maaike de Waard |
| (United States) Caeleb Dressel (C) | (Germany) Kathrin Demler |
| (United States) Nic Fink | (United States) Sherridon Dressel |
| (United States) Townley Haas | (United States) Emily Escobedo |
| (Russia) Aleksandr Krasnykh | (United States) Hali Flickinger |
| (Poland) Kacper Majchrzak | (United States) Molly Hannis |
| (Mexico) José Ángel Martínez | (United States) Natalie Hinds |
| (Ecuador) Tomas Peribonio | (United States) Lilly King |
| (Netherlands) Jesse Puts | (Germany) Leonie Kullmann |
| (United States) Justin Ress | (United States) Beata Nelson |
| (United States) Coleman Stewart | (Germany) Marie Pietruschka |
| (United Kingdom) Mark Szaranek | (Canada) Katerine Savard |
| (Chinese Taipei) Eddie Wang | (United States) Olivia Smoliga (vice-captain) |
| (United Kingdom) Brodie Williams | (Russia) Anastasia Sorokina |

(United States) DC Trident
| Men | Women |
|---|---|
| (United States) Zach Apple | (Canada) Bailey Andison |
| (United States) Tommy Cope | (Russia) Tatiana Belonogoff |
| (United States) Zane Grothe | (Germany) Annika Bruhn |
| (United States) Zach Harting | (United States) Ali DeLoof |
| (United States) Ryan Hoffer | (The Bahamas) Joanna Evans |
| (Australia) Tristan Hollard | (Australia) Madeline Groves |
| (United States) Jay Litherland | (United States) Bella Hindley |
| (United States) Andrew Loy | (United Kingdom) Anna Hopkin |
| (United States) Cody Miller | (Hungary) Zsuzsanna Jakabos |
| (United States) Camden Murphy | (United States) Madison Kennedy |
| (Russia) Mark Nikolaev | (United States) Linnea Mack |
| (United States) Jacob Pebley | (Poland) Klaudia Naziębło |
| (Egypt) Mohamed Samy | (Australia) Leah Neale |
| (Russia) Aleksandr Shchegolev | (Canada) Rachel Nicol |
| (Ukraine) Sergii Shevtsov | (Egypt) Farida Osman |
| (Brazil) Felipe França Silva | (Russia) Maria Temnikova |
| (Serbia) Velimir Stjepanović | (Australia) Brianna Throssell |
| (Greece) Andreas Vazaios | (Singapore) Ting Wen Quah |

(United States) New York Breakers
| Men | Women |
|---|---|
| (Brazil) Brandonn Almeida | (Russia) Svetlana Chimrova |
| (Austria) Felix Aubock | (Poland) Kornelia Fiedkiewicz |
| (Israel) Meiron Cheruti | (United Kingdom) Lucy Hope |
| (New Zealand) Lewis Clareburt | (Hungary) Ajna Késely |
| (United Kingdom) Elliot Clogg | (Portugal) Ana Monteiro |
| (Germany) Philip Heintz | (Poland) Paulina Peda |
| (Germany) Marco Koch | (United Kingdom) Molly Renshaw |
| (Poland) Jakub Kraska | (Netherlands) Tes Schouten |
| (United Kingdom) Joe Litchfield | (Denmark) Karoline Sørensen |
| (Poland) Jakub Majerski | (Netherlands) Marrit Steenbergen |
| (Netherlands) Stan Pijnenburg | (Russia) Arina Surkova |
| (Romania) David Popovici | (Poland) Alicja Tchórz |
| (Australia) Brendon Smith | (Russia) Daria S. Ustinova |
| (Australia) Matthew Temple | (United Kingdom) Sarah Vasey |
| (France) Mewen Tomac | (United Kingdom) Abbie Wood |
| (United Kingdom) Jacob Whittle | (Ukraine) Daryna Zevina |
| (United Kingdom) James Wilby |

(United States) LA Current
| Men | Women |
|---|---|
| (Canada) Javier Acevedo | (United States) Kathleen Baker |
| (Ukraine) Vladyslav Bukhov | (Australia) Bronte Campbell |
| (Greece) Apostolos Christou | (United Kingdom) Imogen Clark |
| (Brazil) Breno Correia | (Belgium) Valentine Dumont |
| (Mexico) Héctor Cruz | (Italy) Sara Franceschi |
| (United States) Abrahm DeVine | (New Zealand) Helena Gasson |
| (Greece) Kristian Golomeev | (France) Béryl Gastaldello (vice-captain) |
| (United States) Ryan Held | (Israel) Anastasia Gorbenko |
| (United States) Will Licon | (United States) Katie McLaughlin |
| (Russia) Martin Malyutin | (Greece) Anna Ntountounaki |
| (United States) Ryan Murphy (C) | (Australia) Lani Pallister |
| (United States) Brett Pinfold | (Argentina) Julia Sebastián |
| (United States) Maxime Rooney | (Lithuania) Kotryna Teterevkova |
| (Austria) Christopher Rothbauer | (United States) Abbey Weitzeil |
| (Brazil) Fernando Scheffer | (Canada) Ingrid Wilm |
| (United States) Tom Shields | (Australia) Madi Wilson |
| (Australia) Matthew Wilson | (Belarus) Alina Zmushka |
| (Norway) Tomoe Zenimoto Hvas |

(Canada) Toronto Titans
| Men | Women |
|---|---|
| (Denmark) Tobias Bjerg | (United States) (Czech Republic) Anika Apostalon |
| (Russia) Sergey Fesikov | (United States) Lisa Bratton |
| (Canada) Brent Hayden (Vice-captain) | (Canada) Tessa Cieplucha |
| (Canada) Yuri Kisil | (Sweden) Michelle Coleman |
| (Canada) Finlay Knox | (Russia) Anna Egorova |
| (Netherlands) Luc Kroon | (United Kingdom) Candice Hall |
| (Germany) Marius Kusch | (Sweden) Louise Hansson |
| (United Kingdom) Jay Lelliott | (Liechtenstein) Julia Hassler |
| (United Kingdom) Max Litchfield | (Australia) Chelsea Hodges |
| (Iceland) Anton McKee | (Sweden) Sara Junevik |
| (Belarus) Grigori Pekarski | (Canada) Kylie Masse (C) |
| (United States) Blake Pieroni | (Canada) Summer McIntosh |
| (Canada) Cole Pratt | (United States) Kaersten Meitz |
| (Italy) Alberto Razzetti | (Brazil) Larissa Oliveira |
| (Republic of Ireland) Shane Ryan | (Canada) Kayla Sanchez |
| (Germany) Fabian Schwingenschlögl | (United Kingdom) Laura Stephens |
| (Germany) Nils Wich-Glasen | (Poland) Dominika Sztandera |
| (Italy) Lorenzo Zazzeri | (Poland) Kasia Wasick |
| | (United Kingdom) Aimee Wilmott |
| | (Canada) Kelsey Wog |

(France) Energy Standard
| Men | Women |
|---|---|
| (Lithuania) Simonas Bilis | (United States) Madeline Banic |
| (United Kingdom) Adam Barrett | (Russia) Evgeniia Chikunova |
| (Italy) Marco De Tullio | (United Kingdom) Georgia Davies |
| (United Kingdom) James Guy | (Turkey) Viktoriya Zeynep Güneş |
| (Russia) Kliment Kolesnikov | (Canada) Mary-Sophie Harvey |
| (South Africa) Chad le Clos (C) | (Hong Kong) Siobhán Haughey |
| (Brazil) Felipe Lima | (Netherlands) Femke Heemskerk |
| (Australia) Travis Mahoney | (Hungary) Boglárka Kapás |
| (France) Florent Manaudou | (Czech Republic) Simona Kubová |
| (France) Clément Mignon | (Brazil) Etiene Medeiros |
| (India) Sajan Prakash | (Italy) Benedetta Pilato |
| (United Kingdom) Ben Proud | (Denmark) Helena Rosendahl Bach |
| (Russia) Evgeny Rylov | (Australia) Emily Seebohm |
| (Belarus) Ilya Shymanovich | (Slovenia) Janja Šegel |
| (Russia) Maxim Stupin | (Belarus) Anastasiya Shkurdai |
| (United States) Charlie Swanson | (Sweden) Sarah Sjöström (C) |
| (Russia) Andrei Zhilkin | (Finland) Fanny Teijonsalo |
| (Estonia) Kregor Zirk | (Spain) Jessica Vall Montero |

(Hungary) Team Iron
| Men | Women |
|---|---|
| (Brazil) Guilherme Basseto | (Russia) Veronika Andrusenko |
| (Serbia) Andrej Barna | (Denmark) Emilie Beckmann |
| (Netherlands) Thom de Boer | (Italy) Costanza Coconcelli |
| (Romania) Robert Glință (vice-captain) | (United States) Casey Fanz |
| (Hungary) Maksim Lobanovskij | (France) Mélanie Henique |
| (Germany) Lukas Märtens | (Republic of Ireland) Danielle Hill |
| (Brazil) Luiz Altamir Melo | (Hungary) Katinka Hosszú (C) |
| (Hungary) Kristóf Milák | (Finland) Ida Hulkko |
| (Italy) Lorenzo Mora | (Netherlands) Ranomi Kromowidjojo |
| (Italy) Marco Orsi | (Norway) Ingeborg Løyning |
| (Austria) Bernhard Reitshammer | (Italy) Silvia Scalia |
| (United Kingdom) Matthew Richards | (Czech Republic) Barbora Seemanová |
| (Sweden) Erik Persson | (Canada) Kierra Smith |
| (Brazil) Leonardo Santos | (Australia) Jenna Strauch |
| (Brazil) Nicholas Santos | (United Kingdom) Alys Thomas |
| (Turkey) Hüseyin Emre Sakçı | (Switzerland) Alexandra Touretski |
| (Russia) Kirill Strelnikov | (Switzerland) Maria Ugolkova |
| (Russia) Mikhail Vekovishchev | (Spain) África Zamorano |
| (Hungary) Dávid Verrasztó |

(United Kingdom) London Roar
| Men | Women |
|---|---|
| (Trinidad and Tobago) Dylan Carter | (United Kingdom) Freya Anderson |
| (Australia) Kyle Chalmers | (Australia) Minna Atherton |
| (United Kingdom) Tom Dean | (Jamaica) Alia Atkinson |
| (Germany) Christian Diener | (Italy) Ilaria Bianchi |
| (United Kingdom) Luke Greenbank | (Netherlands) Kim Busch |
| (Brazil) Guilherme Guido | (Australia) Cate Campbell |
| (Australia) Zac Incerti | (Finland) Laura Lahtinen |
| (Brazil) Vini Lanza | (Finland) Jenna Laukkanen |
| (United Kingdom) Ed Mildred | (United States) Annie Lazor |
| (Japan) Teppei Morimoto | (Australia) Emma McKeon |
| (United Kingdom) Ross Murdoch | (Israel) Andi Murez |
| (Japan) Katsumi Nakamura | (Canada) Sydney Pickrem (C) |
| (United Kingdom) Adam Peaty (C) | (United Kingdom) Katie Shanahan |
| (Russia) Kirill Prigoda | (Netherlands) Kira Toussaint |
| (United Kingdom) Duncan Scott | (Netherlands) Valerie van Roon |
| (Netherlands) Kenzo Simons | (France) Marie Wattel |
| (United Kingdom) Sam Williamson |

(Italy) Aqua Centurions
| Men | Women |
|---|---|
| (Italy) Stefano Ballo | (Australia) Holly Barratt |
| (Russia) Ilya Borodin | (Italy) Martina Caramignoli |
| (Italy) Thomas Ceccon | (Italy) Martina Carraro |
| (Italy) Matteo Ciampi | (Italy) Arianna Castiglioni |
| (Brazil) Marcelo Chierighini | (United Kingdom) Kathleen Dawson |
| (Brazil) Leonardo de Deus | (Italy) Elena Di Liddo |
| (Russia) Vladislav Grinev | (Italy) Silvia Di Pietro |
| (Italy) Nicolò Martinenghi | (United Kingdom) Holly Hibbott |
| (Italy) Alessandro Miressi | (Russia) Maria Kameneva |
| (United States) Chase Kalisz | (France) Fantine Lesaffre |
| (Netherlands) Arno Kamminga | (Spain) Lidón Muñoz |
| (Poland) Radosław Kawęcki | (Russia) Rozaliya Nasretdinova |
| (Italy) Matteo Rivolta | (Japan) Rika Omoto |
| (Italy) Simone Sabbioni | (Italy) Federica Pellegrini (C) |
| (Brazil) Fabio Santi | (Italy) Alessia Polieri |
| (Italy) Fabio Scozzoli (VC) | (Australia) Laura Taylor |
| (Hungary) Szebasztián Szabó |

(Japan) Tokyo Frog Kings
| Men | Women |
|---|---|
| (United States) Bowe Becker | (Japan) Tomomi Aoki |
| (Hungary) Richárd Bohus | (United States) Mallory Comerford |
| (Netherlands) Maarten Brzoskowski | (United States) Catherine DeLoof |
| (Russia) Ivan Girev | (United States) Gabby DeLoof |
| (Japan) Tomoru Honda | (Japan) Suzuka Hasegawa |
| (Japan) Takeshi Kawamoto | (Japan) Chihiro Igarashi |
| (Japan) Yasuhiro Koseki | (United States) Leah Gingrich |
| (Russia) Vladimir Morozov | (United Kingdom) Harriet Jones |
| (Hungary) Nandor Nemeth | (United Kingdom) Keanna MacInnes |
| (Russia) Daniil Pasynkov | (United States) Paige Madden |
| (Italy) Alessandro Pinzuti | (Luxembourg) Julie Meynen |
| (Italy) Federico Poggio | (United States) Leah Smith |
| (Venezuela) Cristian Quintero | (United States) Aly Tetzloff |
| (Japan) Daiya Seto | (United States) Miranda Tucker |
| (Brazil) Pedro Spajari | (Japan) Kanako Watanabe |
| (Australia) Zac Stubblety-Cook | (United Kingdom) Cassie Wild |
| (Russia) Grigoriy Tarasevich |

== Standings ==
2021 ISL Final Match

| Pos. | Team | Total score |
|---|---|---|
| 1 | (France) Energy Standard | 534.0 |
| 2 | (United States) Cali Condors | 522.0 |
| 3 | (United Kingdom) London Roar | 393.5 |
| 4 | (United States) LA Current | 305.5 |

2021 ISL Play Offs

| Pos. | Team | Eindhoven 1 (Netherlands) | Eindhoven 2 (Netherlands) | Eindhoven 3 (Netherlands) | Eindhoven 4 (Netherlands) | Eindhoven 5 (Netherlands) | Eindhoven 6 (Netherlands) | Total score | Points |
|---|---|---|---|---|---|---|---|---|---|
| 1 | (France) Energy Standard | 522 | | 583 | | 561.5 | | 1,666.5 | 11 |
| 2 | (United States) Cali Condors | 534.5 | | | 474.5 | | 532.5 | 1,541.5 | 11 |
| 3 | (United Kingdom) London Roar | | 494.5 | | 534.5 | 498.5 | | 1,527.5 | 10 |
| 4 | (United States) LA Current | | 506 | | 438.5 | 415.5 | | 1,360 | 8 |
| 5 | (Canada) Toronto Titans | | 398.5 | 407 | | | 331 | 1,136.5 | 6 |
| 6 | (Italy) Aqua Centurions | | 357 | 390 | | | 444.5 | 1,191.5 | 5 |
| 7 | (Hungary) Team Iron | 340 | | | 324.5 | | 446 | 1,110.5 | 5 |
| 8 | (United States) DC Trident | 359.5 | | 383 | | 289.5 | | 1,032 | 3 |

Key
| Colour | Result |
|---|---|
| Gold | Winner |
| Purple | Did not finish (DNF) |
| Black | Disqualified (DSQ) |
| White | Did not start (DNS) |
| Blank | Withdrew entry from the event (WD) |

2021 ISL Play In Match

The team in yellow are qualified to the Play Offs.

| Pos. | Team | Total score |
|---|---|---|
| 1 | (United States) DC Trident | 506.0 |
| 2 | (Hungary) Team Iron | 497.0 |
| 3 | (United States) NY Breakers | 388.5 |
| 4 | (Japan) Tokyo Frog Kings | 385.5 |

2021 ISL Regular season

The top two finishers of the second edition of the league, Cali Condors and Energy Standard, did not compete against each other during any regular season match.

| Pos. | Team | Naples 1 (Italy) | Naples 2 (Italy) | Naples 3 (Italy) | Naples 4 (Italy) | Naples 5 (Italy) | Naples 6 (Italy) | Naples 7 (Italy) | Naples 8 (Italy) | Naples 9 (Italy) | Naples 10 (Italy) | Total score | Points |
|---|---|---|---|---|---|---|---|---|---|---|---|---|---|
| 1 | (France) Energy Standard | 511.5 | | 640.5 | | | | | 507 | 568 | | 2,227 | 16 |
| 2 | (United States) Cali Condors | | 707 | | 594 | | 478.5 | 581 | | | | 2,360.5 | 15 |
| 3 | (United Kingdom) London Roar | | | 436.5 | | | 529.5 | | 486.5 | 457.5 | | 1,890 | 13 |
| 4 | (Canada) Toronto Titans | 496.5 | | | | 536 | | 529.5 | | 380.5 | | 1,942.5 | 12 |
| 5 | (United States) LA Current | | 402.5 | | 444.5 | 452.5 | | | 395.5 | | | 1,695 | 11 |
| 6 | (Italy) Aqua Centurions | 442.5 | | | 375.5 | | 379.5 | | | | 563 | 1,760.5 | 10 |
| 7 | (Hungary) Team Iron | | | 405.5 | | 374 | | 362.5 | | | 529 | 1,671 | 8 |
| 8 | (Japan) Tokyo Frog Kings | | 371.5 | | | | 376.5 | | 379 | | 397 | 1,524 | 6 |
| 9 | (United States) DC Trident | 311.5 | | | 359 | 416.5 | | | | 357 | | 1,444 | 5 |
| 10 | (United States) NY Breakers | | 265 | 278.5 | | | | 293 | | | 272 | 1108.5 | 4 |

Key
| Colour | Result |
|---|---|
| Gold | Winner |
| Purple | Did not finish (DNF) |
| Black | Disqualified (DSQ) |
| White | Did not start (DNS) |
| Blank | Withdrew entry from the event (WD) |

== Event winners ==
=== 50 m freestyle ===
| Meet | Men | | | Women | | |
| Meet | Winner | Team | Time | Winner | Team | Time |
|---|---|---|---|---|---|---|
| Naples 1 | (United Kingdom) Ben Proud | (France) Energy Standard | 21.15 | (Sweden) Sarah Sjöström | (France) Energy Standard | 23.50 |
| Naples 2 | (United States) Caeleb Dressel | (United States) Cali Condors | 20.86 | (United States) Abbey Weitzeil | (United States) LA Current | 23.83 |
| Naples 3 | (United Kingdom) Ben Proud | (France) Energy Standard | 20.86 | (Sweden) Sarah Sjöström | (France) Energy Standard | 23.17 |
| Naples 4 | (United States) Caeleb Dressel | (United States) Cali Condors | 20.67 | (United States) Abbey Weitzeil | (United States) LA Current | 23.63 |
| Naples 5 | (United States) Ryan Hoffer | (United States) DC Trident | 21.25 | (Poland) Kasia Wasick | (Canada) Toronto Titans | 23.78 |
| Naples 6 | (United States) Justin Ress | (United States) Cali Condors | 21.06 | (Australia) Emma McKeon | (United Kingdom) London Roar | 23.60 |
| Naples 7 | (United States) Justin Ress | (United States) Cali Condors | 21.16 | (Poland) Kasia Wasick | (Canada) Toronto Titans | 23.40 |
| Naples 8 | (Australia) Kyle Chalmers | (United Kingdom) London Roar | 20.80 | (United States) Abbey Weitzeil | (United States) LA Current | 23.44 |
| Naples 9 | (United Kingdom) Ben Proud | (France) Energy Standard | 20.84 | (Sweden) Sarah Sjöström | (France) Energy Standard | 23.53 |
| Naples 10 | (Hungary) Szebasztián Szabó | (Italy) Aqua Centurions | 21.13 | (United States) Catie DeLoof | (Japan) Tokyo Frog Kings | 24.19 |
| Naples PI | (United States) Ryan Hoffer | (United States) DC Trident | 21.13 | (Netherlands) Ranomi Kromowidjojo | (Hungary) Team Iron | 23.74 |
| Eindhoven PO 1 | (United States) Justin Ress | (United States) Cali Condors | 21.04 | (Sweden) Sarah Sjöström | (France) Energy Standard | 23.32 |
| Eindhoven PO 2 | (Australia) Kyle Chalmers | (United Kingdom) London Roar | 21.10 | (Poland) Kasia Wasick | (Canada) Toronto Titans | 23.46 |
| Eindhoven PO 3 | (United Kingdom) Ben Proud | (France) Energy Standard | 20.64 | (Sweden) Sarah Sjöström | (France) Energy Standard | 23.08 |
| Eindhoven PO 4 | (Australia) Kyle Chalmers | (United Kingdom) London Roar | 20.97 | (United States) Abbey Weitzeil | (United States) LA Current | 23.90 |
| Eindhoven PO 5 | (Australia) Kyle Chalmers | (United Kingdom) London Roar | 20.82 | (Sweden) Sarah Sjöström | (France) Energy Standard | 23.12 |
| Eindhoven PO 6 | (Netherlands) Thom de Boer | (Hungary) Team Iron | 20.97 | (Poland) Kasia Wasick | (Canada) Toronto Titans | 23.49 |
| Eindhoven F | (United Kingdom) Ben Proud | (France) Energy Standard | 20.40 | (Sweden) Sarah Sjöström | (France) Energy Standard | 23.27 |

=== 100 m freestyle ===
| Meet | Men | | | Women | | |
| Meet | Winner | Team | Time | Winner | Team | Time |
|---|---|---|---|---|---|---|
| Naples 1 | (Italy) Alessandro Miressi | (Italy) Aqua Centurions | 46.30 | (Hong Kong) Siobhán Haughey | (France) Energy Standard | 51.22 |
| Naples 2 | (United States) Caeleb Dressel | (United States) Cali Condors | 45.94 | (United States) Abbey Weitzeil | (United States) LA Current | 51.66 |
| Naples 3 | (United Kingdom) Duncan Scott | (United Kingdom) London Roar | 46.80 | (Hong Kong) Siobhán Haughey | (France) Energy Standard | 51.64 |
| Naples 4 | (United States) Caeleb Dressel | (United States) Cali Condors | 45.47 | (United States) Abbey Weitzeil | (United States) LA Current | 51.62 |
| Naples 5 | (United States) Maxime Rooney | (United States) LA Current | 46.68 | (Australia) Madison Wilson | (United States) LA Current | 51.72 |
| Naples 6 | (United Kingdom) Duncan Scott | (United Kingdom) London Roar | 46.53 | (Australia) Emma McKeon | (United Kingdom) London Roar | 51.47 |
| Naples 7 | (United States) Justin Ress | (United States) Cali Condors | 46.58 | (Poland) Kasia Wasick | (Canada) Toronto Titans | 51.44 |
| Naples 8 | (Australia) Kyle Chalmers | (United Kingdom) London Roar | 45.65 | (Australia) Emma McKeon | (United Kingdom) London Roar | 51.05 |
| Naples 9 | (Australia) Kyle Chalmers | (United Kingdom) London Roar | 46.02 | (Hong Kong) Siobhán Haughey | (France) Energy Standard | 51.42 |
| Naples 10 | (Italy) Alessandro Miressi | (Italy) Aqua Centurions | 46.31 | (Netherlands) Ranomi Kromowidjojo | (Hungary) Team Iron | 51.99 |
| Naples PI | (Russia) Aleksandr Shchegolev | (United States) DC Trident | 46.66 | (Netherlands) Ranomi Kromowidjojo | (Hungary) Team Iron | 51.85 |
| Eindhoven PO 1 | (Russia) Kliment Kolesnikov | (France) Energy Standard | 46.11 | (Hong Kong) Siobhán Haughey | (France) Energy Standard | 51.46 |
| Eindhoven PO 2 | (Australia) Kyle Chalmers | (United Kingdom) London Roar | 46.30 | (Australia) Emma McKeon | (United Kingdom) London Roar | 51.28 |
| Eindhoven PO 3 | (Russia) Aleksandr Shchegolev | (United States) DC Trident | 46.38 | (Hong Kong) Siobhán Haughey | (France) Energy Standard | 51.11 |
| Eindhoven PO 4 | (Australia) Kyle Chalmers | (United Kingdom) London Roar | 45.70 | (Australia) Emma McKeon | (United Kingdom) London Roar | 51.51 |
| Eindhoven PO 5 | (Australia) Kyle Chalmers | (United Kingdom) London Roar | 46.23 | (Hong Kong) Siobhán Haughey | (France) Energy Standard | 51.13 |
| Eindhoven PO 6 | (United States) Justin Ress | (United States) Cali Condors | 45.70 | (United States) Erika Brown | (United States) Cali Condors | 51.70 |
| Eindhoven F | (Australia) Kyle Chalmers | (United Kingdom) London Roar | 45.73 | (Hong Kong) Siobhán Haughey | (France) Energy Standard | 50.79 |

=== 200 m freestyle ===
| Meet | Men | | | Women | | |
| Meet | Winner | Team | Time | Winner | Team | Time |
|---|---|---|---|---|---|---|
| Naples 1 | (United States) Blake Pieroni | (Canada) Toronto Titans | 1:44.39 | (Hong Kong) Siobhán Haughey | (France) Energy Standard | 1:52.88 |
| Naples 2 | (Brazil) Fernando Scheffer | (United States) LA Current | 1:42.86 | (Australia) Madison Wilson | (United States) LA Current | 1:53.74 |
| Naples 3 | (United Kingdom) Duncan Scott | (United Kingdom) London Roar | 1:42.60 | (Hong Kong) Siobhán Haughey | (France) Energy Standard | 1:52.82 |
| Naples 4 | (Russia) Martin Malyutin | (United States) LA Current | 1:42.33 | (Australia) Madison Wilson | (United States) LA Current | 1:53.75 |
| Naples 5 | (Russia) Aleksandr Shchegolev | (United States) DC Trident | 1:42.26 | (Australia) Madison Wilson | (United States) LA Current | 1:53.77 |
| Naples 6 | (United Kingdom) Duncan Scott | (United Kingdom) London Roar | 1:42.43 | (United States) Erika Brown | (United States) Cali Condors | 1:54.17 |
| Naples 7 | (Netherlands) Luc Kroon | (Canada) Toronto Titans | 1:43.15 | (Czech Republic) Barbora Seemanová | (Hungary) Team Iron | 1:54.09 |
| Naples 8 | (United Kingdom) Duncan Scott | (United Kingdom) London Roar | 1:42.13 | (Hong Kong) Siobhán Haughey | (France) Energy Standard | 1:52.50 |
| Naples 9 | (United Kingdom) Duncan Scott | (United Kingdom) London Roar | 1:41.72 | (Hong Kong) Siobhán Haughey | (France) Energy Standard | 1:52.25 |
| Naples 10 | (United Kingdom) Joe Litchfield | (United States) New York Breakers | 1:43.04 | (Czech Republic) Barbora Seemanová | (Hungary) Team Iron | 1:53.31 |
| Naples PI | (Russia) Aleksandr Shchegolev | (United States) DC Trident | 1:42.37 | (Czech Republic) Barbora Seemanová | (Hungary) Team Iron | 1:53.97 |
| Eindhoven PO 1 | (Russia) Aleksandr Shchegolev | (United States) DC Trident | 1:42.29 | (Hong Kong) Siobhán Haughey | (France) Energy Standard | 1:51.17 |
| Eindhoven PO 2 | (Netherlands) Luc Kroon | (Canada) Toronto Titans | 1:43.48 | (United Kingdom) Freya Anderson | (United Kingdom) London Roar | 1:53.00 |
| Eindhoven PO 3 | (Russia) Aleksandr Shchegolev | (United States) DC Trident | 1:41.01 | (Hong Kong) Siobhán Haughey | (France) Energy Standard | 1:50.66 |
| Eindhoven PO 4 | (Australia) Kyle Chalmers | (United Kingdom) London Roar | 1:41.68 | (United Kingdom) Freya Anderson | (United Kingdom) London Roar | 1:53.17 |
| Eindhoven PO 5 | (Russia) Aleksandr Shchegolev | (United States) DC Trident | 1:41.72 | (Hong Kong) Siobhán Haughey | (France) Energy Standard | 1:50.65 |
| Eindhoven PO 6 | (Netherlands) Luc Kroon | (Canada) Toronto Titans | 1:42.72 | (Czech Republic) Barbora Seemanová | (Hungary) Team Iron | 1:54.17 |
| Eindhoven F | (United States) Townley Haas | (United States) Cali Condors | 1:42.18 | (Hong Kong) Siobhán Haughey | (France) Energy Standard | 1:51.04 |

=== 400 m freestyle ===
| Meet | Men | | | Women | | |
| Meet | Winner | Team | Time | Winner | Team | Time |
|---|---|---|---|---|---|---|
| Naples 1 | (Italy) Matteo Ciampi | (Italy) Aqua Centurions | 3:42.48 | (Australia) Leah Neale | (United States) DC Trident | 4:01.29 |
| Naples 2 | (Australia) Brendon Smith | (United States) New York Breakers | 3:42.50 | (Belgium) Valentine Dumont | (United States) LA Current | 4:04.47 |
| Naples 3 | (Australia) Brendon Smith | (United States) New York Breakers | 3:40.41 | (Hong Kong) Siobhán Haughey | (France) Energy Standard | 4:02.59 |
| Naples 4 | (Russia) Martin Malyutin | (United States) LA Current | 3:40.39 | (Australia) Leah Neale (Australia) Madison Wilson | (United States) DC Trident (United States) LA Current | 4:02.98 |
| Naples 5 | (Russia) Martin Malyutin | (United States) LA Current | 3:40.22 | (Canada) Summer McIntosh | (Canada) Toronto Titans | 3:58.78 |
| Naples 6 | (United Kingdom) Duncan Scott | (United Kingdom) London Roar | 3:41.14 | (United States) Paige Madden | (Japan) Tokyo Frog Kings | 4:02.84 |
| Naples 7 | (Australia) Brendon Smith | (United States) New York Breakers | 3:40.09 | (Liechtenstein) Julia Hassler | (Canada) Toronto Titans | 4:01.30 |
| Naples 8 | (United Kingdom) Duncan Scott | (United Kingdom) London Roar | 3:39.52 | (Hong Kong) Siobhán Haughey | (France) Energy Standard | 4:00.23 |
| Naples 9 | (Netherlands) Luc Kroon | (Canada) Toronto Titans | 3:40.74 | (Hong Kong) Siobhán Haughey | (France) Energy Standard | 4:00.67 |
| Naples 10 | (Australia) Brendon Smith | (United States) New York Breakers | 3:39.20 | (Czech Republic) Barbora Seemanová | (Hungary) Team Iron | 4:02.09 |
| Naples PI | (Australia) Brendon Smith | (United States) New York Breakers | 3:37.11 | (The Bahamas) Joanna Evans | (United States) DC Trident | 4:00.14 |
| Eindhoven PO 1 | (Estonia) Kregor Zirk | (France) Energy Standard | 3:41.13 | (Hong Kong) Siobhán Haughey | (France) Energy Standard | 3:59.16 |
| Eindhoven PO 2 | (Netherlands) Luc Kroon | (Canada) Toronto Titans | 3:40.96 | (Canada) Summer McIntosh | (Canada) Toronto Titans | 3:59.30 |
| Eindhoven PO 3 | (Netherlands) Luc Kroon | (Canada) Toronto Titans | 3:39.53 | (Hong Kong) Siobhán Haughey | (France) Energy Standard | 3:57.06 |
| Eindhoven PO 4 | (United Kingdom) Duncan Scott | (United Kingdom) London Roar | 3:39.11 | (United States) Hali Flickinger | (United States) Cali Condors | 4:00.82 |
| Eindhoven PO 5 | (United Kingdom) Tom Dean | (United Kingdom) London Roar | 3:40.20 | (Hong Kong) Siobhán Haughey | (France) Energy Standard | 3:58.44 |
| Eindhoven PO 6 | (United Kingdom) Max Litchfield | (Canada) Toronto Titans | 3:39.49 | (United States) Hali Flickinger | (United States) Cali Condors | 4:01.02 |
| Eindhoven F | (United Kingdom) Tom Dean | (United Kingdom) London Roar | 3:40.67 | (Hong Kong) Siobhán Haughey | (France) Energy Standard | 3:58.80 |

=== 50 m backstroke ===
| Meet | Men | | | Women | | |
| Meet | Winner | Team | Time | Winner | Team | Time |
|---|---|---|---|---|---|---|
| Naples 1 | (Republic of Ireland) Shane Ryan | (Canada) Toronto Titans | 22.82 | (Canada) Kylie Masse | (Canada) Toronto Titans | 26.41 |
| Naples 2 | (United States) Coleman Stewart | (United States) Cali Condors | 22.61 | (United States) Sherridon Dressel | (United States) Cali Condors | 26.67 |
| Naples 3 | (Brazil) Guilherme Guido | (United Kingdom) London Roar | 22.60 | (Netherlands) Kira Toussaint | (United Kingdom) London Roar | 26.28 |
| Naples 4 | (United States) Coleman Stewart | (United States) Cali Condors | 22.98 | (United States) Ali DeLoof | (United States) DC Trident | 26.25 |
| Naples 5 | (Republic of Ireland) Shane Ryan | (Canada) Toronto Titans | 22.98 | (United States) Ali DeLoof | (United States) DC Trident | 25.98 |
| Naples 6 | (Brazil) Guilherme Guido | (United Kingdom) London Roar | 22.60 | (Netherlands) Kira Toussaint | (United Kingdom) London Roar | 26.11 |
| Naples 7 | (United States) Coleman Stewart | (United States) Cali Condors | 23.12 | (Poland) Alicja Tchórz | (United States) New York Breakers | 26.38 |
| Naples 8 | (Brazil) Guilherme Guido | (United Kingdom) London Roar | 22.88 | (Netherlands) Kira Toussaint (Canada) Ingrid Wilm | (United Kingdom) London Roar (United States) LA Current | 26.08 |
| Naples 9 | (Brazil) Guilherme Guido | (United Kingdom) London Roar | 22.73 | (Canada) Kylie Masse | (Canada) Toronto Titans | 26.23 |
| Naples 10 | (Brazil) Guilherme Basseto | (Hungary) Team Iron | 23.22 | (Italy) Elena Di Liddo | (Italy) Aqua Centurions | 26.39 |
| Naples PI | (Russia) Mark Nikolaev | (United States) DC Trident | 22.98 | (United States) Ali DeLoof (France) Mélanie Henique | (United States) DC Trident (Hungary) Team Iron | 26.32 |
| Eindhoven PO 1 | (Russia) Kliment Kolesnikov | (France) Energy Standard | 22.94 | (Czech Republic) Simona Kubová (Netherlands) Maaike de Waard | (France) Energy Standard (United States) Cali Condors | 26.55 |
| Eindhoven PO 2 | (United States) Ryan Murphy | (United States) LA Current | 22.79 | (Netherlands) Kira Toussaint | (United Kingdom) London Roar | 25.91 |
| Eindhoven PO 3 | (Russia) Mark Nikolaev | (United States) DC Trident | 22.67 | (Canada) Kylie Masse | (Canada) Toronto Titans | 26.04 |
| Eindhoven PO 4 | (United States) Ryan Murphy | (United States) LA Current | 22.63 | (Netherlands) Kira Toussaint | (United Kingdom) London Roar | 25.99 |
| Eindhoven PO 5 | (United States) Ryan Murphy | (United States) LA Current | 22.53 | (Netherlands) Kira Toussaint | (United Kingdom) London Roar | 26.09 |
| Eindhoven PO 6 | (Brazil) Guilherme Basseto | (Hungary) Team Iron | 23.11 | (Canada) Kylie Masse | (Canada) Toronto Titans | 26.11 |
| Eindhoven F | (United States) Ryan Murphy | (United States) LA Current | 22.56 | (Canada) Ingrid Wilm | (United States) LA Current | 26.24 |

=== 100 m backstroke ===
| Meet | Men | | | Women | | |
| Meet | Winner | Team | Time | Winner | Team | Time |
|---|---|---|---|---|---|---|
| Naples 1 | (Russia) Evgeny Rylov | (France) Energy Standard | 49.48 | (Canada) Kylie Masse | (Canada) Toronto Titans | 56.52 |
| Naples 2 | (United States) Coleman Stewart | (United States) Cali Condors | 48.33 (WR) | (United States) Sherridon Dressel | (United States) Cali Condors | 57.08 |
| Naples 3 | (Brazil) Guilherme Guido | (United Kingdom) London Roar | 48.95 | (Netherlands) Kira Toussaint | (United Kingdom) London Roar | 56.13 |
| Naples 4 | (United States) Coleman Stewart | (United States) Cali Condors | 49.38 | (Canada) Ingrid Wilm | (United States) LA Current | 55.94 |
| Naples 5 | (Romania) Robert Glință | (Hungary) Team Iron | 50.09 | (Canada) Ingrid Wilm | (United States) LA Current | 55.68 |
| Naples 6 | (Brazil) Guilherme Guido | (United Kingdom) London Roar | 49.29 | (Netherlands) Kira Toussaint | (United Kingdom) London Roar | 56.36 |
| Naples 7 | (United States) Coleman Stewart | (United States) Cali Condors | 49.31 | (Canada) Kylie Masse | (Canada) Toronto Titans | 55.83 |
| Naples 8 | (Brazil) Guilherme Guido | (United Kingdom) London Roar | 49.39 | (Canada) Ingrid Wilm | (United States) LA Current | 55.61 |
| Naples 9 | (Russia) Evgeny Rylov | (France) Energy Standard | 49.42 | (Canada) Kylie Masse | (Canada) Toronto Titans | 56.34 |
| Naples 10 | (Romania) Robert Glință | (Hungary) Team Iron | 49.60 | (Poland) Paulina Peda | (United States) New York Breakers | 57.40 |
| Naples PI | (Russia) Mark Nikolaev | (United States) DC Trident | 49.65 | (United States) Ali DeLoof | (United States) DC Trident | 56.83 |
| Eindhoven PO 1 | (Russia) Mark Nikolaev | (United States) DC Trident | 49.25 | (United States) Ali DeLoof | (United States) DC Trident | 56.81 |
| Eindhoven PO 2 | (United States) Ryan Murphy | (United States) LA Current | 49.49 | (Canada) Ingrid Wilm | (United States) LA Current | 55.78 |
| Eindhoven PO 3 | (Russia) Mark Nikolaev | (United States) DC Trident | 49.69 | (Canada) Kylie Masse | (Canada) Toronto Titans | 55.77 |
| Eindhoven PO 4 | (United States) Ryan Murphy | (United States) LA Current | 49.51 | (Netherlands) Kira Toussaint | (United Kingdom) London Roar | 55.45 |
| Eindhoven PO 5 | (Russia) Mark Nikolaev | (United States) DC Trident | 49.43 | (Canada) Ingrid Wilm | (United States) LA Current | 55.91 |
| Eindhoven PO 6 | (Romania) Robert Glință | (Hungary) Team Iron | 49.84 | (Canada) Kylie Masse | (Canada) Toronto Titans | 56.24 |
| Eindhoven F | (Russia) Evgeny Rylov | (France) Energy Standard | 48.94 | (Canada) Ingrid Wilm | (United States) LA Current | 55.73 |

=== 200 m backstroke ===
| Meet | Men | | | Women | | |
| Meet | Winner | Team | Time | Winner | Team | Time |
|---|---|---|---|---|---|---|
| Naples 1 | (Russia) Evgeny Rylov | (France) Energy Standard | 1:49.61 | (United States) Lisa Bratton | (Canada) Toronto Titans | 2:02.00 |
| Naples 2 | (Russia) Grigoriy Tarasevich | (Japan) Tokyo Frog Kings | 1:51.74 | (United States) Beata Nelson | (United States) Cali Condors | 2:03.96 |
| Naples 3 | (United Kingdom) Luke Greenbank | (United Kingdom) London Roar | 1:50.15 | (Australia) Minna Atherton | (United Kingdom) London Roar | 2:01.98 |
| Naples 4 | (United States) Jacob Pebley | (United States) DC Trident | 1:50.29 | (United States) Beata Nelson | (United States) Cali Condors | 2:01.11 |
| Naples 5 | (United States) Jacob Pebley | (United States) DC Trident | 1:50.39 | (United States) Lisa Bratton | (Canada) Toronto Titans | 2:01.66 |
| Naples 6 | (United Kingdom) Luke Greenbank | (United Kingdom) London Roar | 1:50.36 | (Australia) Minna Atherton | (United Kingdom) London Roar | 2:01.40 |
| Naples 7 | (United States) Coleman Stewart | (United States) Cali Condors | 1:50.98 | (United States) Beata Nelson | (United States) Cali Condors | 2:00.55 |
| Naples 8 | (Germany) Christian Diener | (United Kingdom) London Roar | 1:50.12 | (Canada) Ingrid Wilm | (United States) LA Current | 2:02.26 |
| Naples 9 | (Russia) Evgeny Rylov | (France) Energy Standard | 1:49.93 | (United States) Lisa Bratton | (Canada) Toronto Titans | 2:02.42 |
| Naples 10 | (Russia) Grigoriy Tarasevich | (Japan) Tokyo Frog Kings | 1:50.79 | (Norway) Ingeborg Løyning | (Hungary) Team Iron | 2:03.67 |
| Naples PI | (United States) Jacob Pebley | (United States) DC Trident | 1:48.59 | (United States) Gabby DeLoof | (Japan) Tokyo Frog Kings | 2:04.47 |
| Eindhoven PO 1 | (Italy) Lorenzo Mora | (Hungary) Team Iron | 1:50.92 | (United States) Beata Nelson | (United States) Cali Condors | 2:03.17 |
| Eindhoven PO 2 | (United States) Ryan Murphy | (United States) LA Current | 1:48.43 | (Canada) Kylie Masse | (Canada) Toronto Titans | 2:01.45 |
| Eindhoven PO 3 | (Russia) Evgeny Rylov | (France) Energy Standard | 1:51.47 | (Canada) Kylie Masse | (Canada) Toronto Titans | 2:01.52 |
| Eindhoven PO 4 | (Germany) Christian Diener | (United Kingdom) London Roar | 1:49.04 | (United States) Beata Nelson | (United States) Cali Condors | 2:00.91 |
| Eindhoven PO 5 | (United States) Ryan Murphy | (United States) LA Current | 1:48.10 | (Belarus) Anastasiya Shkurdai | (France) Energy Standard | 2:01.77 |
| Eindhoven PO 6 | (Italy) Lorenzo Mora | (Hungary) Team Iron | 1:50.55 | (United States) Beata Nelson | (United States) Cali Condors | 2:00.84 |
| Eindhoven F | (Russia) Evgeny Rylov | (France) Energy Standard | 1:47.88 | (United States) Beata Nelson | (United States) Cali Condors | 2:00.33 |

=== 50 m breaststroke ===
| Meet | Men | | | Women | | |
| Meet | Winner | Team | Time | Winner | Team | Time |
|---|---|---|---|---|---|---|
| Naples 1 | (Italy) Nicolò Martinenghi | (Italy) Aqua Centurions | 26.03 | (Italy) Arianna Castiglioni | (Italy) Aqua Centurions | 29.42 |
| Naples 2 | (Japan) Yasuhiro Koseki | (Japan) Tokyo Frog Kings | 26.27 | (United States) Molly Hannis | (United States) Cali Condors | 29.41 |
| Naples 3 | (Belarus) Ilya Shymanovich | (France) Energy Standard | 25.41 | (Jamaica) Alia Atkinson | (United Kingdom) London Roar | 29.73 |
| Naples 4 | (Italy) Nicolò Martinenghi | (Italy) Aqua Centurions | 25.74 | (United States) Lilly King | (United States) Cali Condors | 29.15 |
| Naples 5 | (Brazil) Felipe França Silva | (United States) DC Trident | 26.07 | (United Kingdom) Imogen Clark | (United States) LA Current | 29.86 |
| Naples 6 | (Italy) Nicolò Martinenghi | (Italy) Aqua Centurions | 25.86 | (Italy) Arianna Castiglioni | (Italy) Aqua Centurions | 29.46 |
| Naples 7 | (United States) Nic Fink | (United States) Cali Condors | 26.14 | (United States) Lilly King | (United States) Cali Condors | 29.42 |
| Naples 8 | (Belarus) Ilya Shymanovich | (France) Energy Standard | 25.64 | (Jamaica) Alia Atkinson | (United Kingdom) London Roar | 29.47 |
| Naples 9 | (Belarus) Ilya Shymanovich | (France) Energy Standard | 25.56 | (Jamaica) Alia Atkinson | (United Kingdom) London Roar | 29.48 |
| Naples 10 | (Italy) Nicolò Martinenghi | (Italy) Aqua Centurions | 25.89 | (Italy) Arianna Castiglioni | (Italy) Aqua Centurions | 29.09 |
| Naples PI | (Japan) Yasuhiro Koseki | (Japan) Tokyo Frog Kings | 26.01 | (Finland) Ida Hulkko | (Hungary) Team Iron | 29.68 |
| Eindhoven PO 1 | (Belarus) Ilya Shymanovich | (France) Energy Standard | 25.60 | (United States) Lilly King | (United States) Cali Condors | 29.44 |
| Eindhoven PO 2 | (Italy) Nicolò Martinenghi | (Italy) Aqua Centurions | 25.78 | (United Kingdom) Imogen Clark | (United States) LA Current | 29.32 |
| Eindhoven PO 3 | (Italy) Nicolò Martinenghi | (Italy) Aqua Centurions | 25.73 | (Italy) Arianna Castiglioni | (Italy) Aqua Centurions | 29.78 |
| Eindhoven PO 4 | (Austria) Bernhard Reitshammer | (Hungary) Team Iron | 26.10 | (United States) Lilly King | (United States) Cali Condors | 29.36 |
| Eindhoven PO 5 | (Belarus) Ilya Shymanovich | (France) Energy Standard | 25.47 | (Jamaica) Alia Atkinson | (United Kingdom) London Roar | 29.19 |
| Eindhoven PO 6 | (Italy) Fabio Scozzoli (Italy) Nicolò Martinenghi | (Italy) Aqua Centurions (Italy) Aqua Centurions | 25.79 | (United States) Lilly King | (United States) Cali Condors | 29.58 |
| Eindhoven F | (United States) Nic Fink | (United States) Cali Condors | 25.72 | (Jamaica) Alia Atkinson | (United Kingdom) London Roar | 29.15 |

=== 100 m breaststroke ===
| Meet | Men | | | Women | | |
| Meet | Winner | Team | Time | Winner | Team | Time |
|---|---|---|---|---|---|---|
| Naples 1 | (Italy) Nicolò Martinenghi | (Italy) Aqua Centurions | 56.96 | (Italy) Martina Carraro | (Italy) Aqua Centurions | 1:04.85 |
| Naples 2 | (Japan) Yasuhiro Koseki | (Japan) Tokyo Frog Kings | 57.09 | (United States) Lilly King | (United States) Cali Condors | 1:03.54 |
| Naples 3 | (Belarus) Ilya Shymanovich | (France) Energy Standard | 55.86 | (Jamaica) Alia Atkinson | (United Kingdom) London Roar | 1:04.09 |
| Naples 4 | (Italy) Nicolò Martinenghi | (Italy) Aqua Centurions | 56.85 | (United States) Lilly King | (United States) Cali Condors | 1:03.57 |
| Naples 5 | (Germany) Fabian Schwingenschlögl | (Canada) Toronto Titans | 56.93 | (Russia) Tatiana Belonogoff | (United States) DC Trident | 1:05.16 |
| Naples 6 | (Japan) Yasuhiro Koseki | (Japan) Tokyo Frog Kings | 56.31 | (United States) Lilly King | (United States) Cali Condors | 1:03.54 |
| Naples 7 | (United States) Nic Fink | (United States) Cali Condors | 56.74 | (United States) Lilly King | (United States) Cali Condors | 1:03.53 |
| Naples 8 | (Belarus) Ilya Shymanovich | (France) Energy Standard | 55.63 | (Jamaica) Alia Atkinson | (United Kingdom) London Roar | 1:03.93 |
| Naples 9 | (Belarus) Ilya Shymanovich | (France) Energy Standard | 56.10 | (Jamaica) Alia Atkinson | (United Kingdom) London Roar | 1:04.09 |
| Naples 10 | (Netherlands) Arno Kamminga | (Italy) Aqua Centurions | 56.46 | (Italy) Arianna Castiglioni | (Italy) Aqua Centurions | 1:04.09 |
| Naples PI | (Japan) Yasuhiro Koseki | (Japan) Tokyo Frog Kings | 56.54 | (United Kingdom) Molly Renshaw | (United States) New York Breakers | 1:04.84 |
| Eindhoven PO 1 | (Belarus) Ilya Shymanovich | (France) Energy Standard | 55.77 | (United States) Lilly King | (United States) Cali Condors | 1:03.62 |
| Eindhoven PO 2 | (Netherlands) Arno Kamminga | (Italy) Aqua Centurions | 56.31 | (Jamaica) Alia Atkinson | (United Kingdom) London Roar | 1:03.58 |
| Eindhoven PO 3 | (Belarus) Ilya Shymanovich | (France) Energy Standard | 55.32 (WR) | (Italy) Martina Carraro | (Italy) Aqua Centurions | 1:04.89 |
| Eindhoven PO 4 | (United States) Nic Fink | (United States) Cali Condors | 56.51 | (United States) Lilly King | (United States) Cali Condors | 1:03.35 |
| Eindhoven PO 5 | (Belarus) Ilya Shymanovich | (France) Energy Standard | 55.28 (WR) | (Jamaica) Alia Atkinson | (United Kingdom) London Roar | 1:04.38 |
| Eindhoven PO 6 | (Netherlands) Arno Kamminga | (Italy) Aqua Centurions | 55.85 | (United States) Lilly King | (United States) Cali Condors | 1:03.48 |
| Eindhoven F | (United States) Nic Fink | (United States) Cali Condors | 55.56 | (United States) Lilly King | (United States) Cali Condors | 1:03.75 |

=== 200 m breaststroke ===
| Meet | Men | | | Women | | |
| Meet | Winner | Team | Time | Winner | Team | Time |
|---|---|---|---|---|---|---|
| Naples 1 | (United States) Tommy Cope | (United States) DC Trident | 2:04.09 | (Russia) Evgeniia Chikunova | (France) Energy Standard | 2:19.21 |
| Naples 2 | (Japan) Daiya Seto | (Japan) Tokyo Frog Kings | 2:02.72 | (United States) Lilly King | (United States) Cali Condors | 2:17.86 |
| Naples 3 | (Sweden) Erik Persson | (Hungary) Team Iron | 2:04.66 | (Russia) Evgeniia Chikunova | (France) Energy Standard | 2:17.82 |
| Naples 4 | (United States) Nic Fink | (United States) Cali Condors | 2:03.82 | (United States) Lilly King | (United States) Cali Condors | 2:17.66 |
| Naples 5 | (Sweden) Erik Persson | (Hungary) Team Iron | 2:04.24 | (Russia) Maria Temnikova | (United States) DC Trident | 2:18.98 |
| Naples 6 | (Japan) Daiya Seto | (Japan) Tokyo Frog Kings | 2:02.86 | (United States) Lilly King | (United States) Cali Condors | 2:16.83 |
| Naples 7 | (Sweden) Erik Persson | (Hungary) Team Iron | 2:03.45 | (United States) Lilly King | (United States) Cali Condors | 2:17.59 |
| Naples 8 | (Belarus) Ilya Shymanovich | (France) Energy Standard | 2:02.10 | (Russia) Evgeniia Chikunova | (France) Energy Standard | 2:18.44 |
| Naples 9 | (Belarus) Ilya Shymanovich | (France) Energy Standard | 2:02.79 | (Russia) Evgeniia Chikunova | (France) Energy Standard | 2:17.57 |
| Naples 10 | (Sweden) Erik Persson | (Hungary) Team Iron | 2:02.39 | (United Kingdom) Molly Renshaw | (United States) New York Breakers | 2:19.77 |
| Naples PI | (Sweden) Erik Persson | (Hungary) Team Iron | 2:02.88 | (United Kingdom) Abbie Wood | (United States) New York Breakers | 2:19.11 |
| Eindhoven PO 1 | (Belarus) Ilya Shymanovich | (France) Energy Standard | 2:03.77 | (United States) Lilly King | (United States) Cali Condors | 2:17.43 |
| Eindhoven PO 2 | (Netherlands) Arno Kamminga | (Italy) Aqua Centurions | 2:02.52 | (United States) Annie Lazor | (United Kingdom) London Roar | 2:19.01 |
| Eindhoven PO 3 | (Belarus) Ilya Shymanovich | (France) Energy Standard | 2:02.06 | (Russia) Maria Temnikova | (United States) DC Trident | 2:19.38 |
| Eindhoven PO 4 | (Sweden) Erik Persson | (Hungary) Team Iron | 2:02.41 | (United States) Lilly King | (United States) Cali Condors | 2:16.47 |
| Eindhoven PO 5 | (Belarus) Ilya Shymanovich | (France) Energy Standard | 2:02.66 | (United States) Annie Lazor | (United Kingdom) London Roar | 2:18.90 |
| Eindhoven PO 6 | (Netherlands) Arno Kamminga | (Italy) Aqua Centurions | 2:02.67 | (United States) Emily Escobedo | (United States) Cali Condors | 2:20.06 |
| Eindhoven F | (United States) Nic Fink | (United States) Cali Condors | 2:02.41 | (United States) Lilly King | (United States) Cali Condors | 2:17.06 |

=== 50 m butterfly ===
| Meet | Men | | | Women | | |
| Meet | Winner | Team | Time | Winner | Team | Time |
|---|---|---|---|---|---|---|
| Naples 1 | (Germany) Marius Kusch | (Canada) Toronto Titans | 22.45 | (Sweden) Sarah Sjöström | (France) Energy Standard | 24.98 |
| Naples 2 | (Japan) Takeshi Kawamoto | (Japan) Tokyo Frog Kings | 22.28 | (United States) Kelsi Dahlia | (United States) Cali Condors | 25.23 |
| Naples 3 | (Brazil) Nicholas Santos | (Hungary) Team Iron | 22.18 | (Sweden) Sarah Sjöström | (France) Energy Standard | 25.11 |
| Naples 4 | (United States) Caeleb Dressel | (United States) Cali Condors | 22.23 | (Australia) Holly Barratt | (Italy) Aqua Centurions | 25.40 |
| Naples 5 | (Brazil) Nicholas Santos | (Hungary) Team Iron | 22.28 | (Netherlands) Ranomi Kromowidjojo | (Hungary) Team Iron | 24.81 |
| Naples 6 | (Hungary) Szebasztián Szabó | (Italy) Aqua Centurions | 22.18 | (Australia) Holly Barratt | (Italy) Aqua Centurions | 25.30 |
| Naples 7 | (Brazil) Nicholas Santos | (Hungary) Team Iron | 22.09 | (Netherlands) Ranomi Kromowidjojo | (Hungary) Team Iron | 24.90 |
| Naples 8 | (Trinidad and Tobago) Dylan Carter | (United Kingdom) London Roar | 22.40 | (Sweden) Sarah Sjöström | (France) Energy Standard | 25.16 |
| Naples 9 | (United Kingdom) Ben Proud | (France) Energy Standard | 22.26 | (Sweden) Sarah Sjöström | (France) Energy Standard | 25.15 |
| Naples 10 | (Brazil) Nicholas Santos | (Hungary) Team Iron | 21.83 | (Australia) Holly Barratt | (Italy) Aqua Centurions | 25.28 |
| Naples PI | (Brazil) Nicholas Santos | (Hungary) Team Iron | 21.81 | (Netherlands) Ranomi Kromowidjojo | (Hungary) Team Iron | 25.23 |
| Eindhoven PO 1 | (Brazil) Nicholas Santos | (Hungary) Team Iron | 22.23 | (Sweden) Sarah Sjöström | (France) Energy Standard | 24.64 |
| Eindhoven PO 2 | (United States) Tom Shields | (United States) LA Current | 22.51 | (Australia) Holly Barratt | (Italy) Aqua Centurions | 25.31 |
| Eindhoven PO 3 | (Italy) Matteo Rivolta | (Italy) Aqua Centurions | 22.47 | (Sweden) Sarah Sjöström | (France) Energy Standard | 24.75 |
| Eindhoven PO 4 | (Brazil) Nicholas Santos | (Hungary) Team Iron | 21.98 | (Netherlands) Ranomi Kromowidjojo | (Hungary) Team Iron | 24.77 |
| Eindhoven PO 5 | (United States) Tom Shields | (United States) LA Current | 22.15 | (Sweden) Sarah Sjöström | (France) Energy Standard | 24.72 |
| Eindhoven PO 6 | (Brazil) Nicholas Santos | (Hungary) Team Iron | 22.09 | (Netherlands) Ranomi Kromowidjojo | (Hungary) Team Iron | 24.62 |
| Eindhoven F | (United Kingdom) Ben Proud | (France) Energy Standard | 22.18 | (United States) Kelsi Dahlia | (United States) Cali Condors | 24.86 |

=== 100 m butterfly ===
| Meet | Men | | | Women | | |
| Meet | Winner | Team | Time | Winner | Team | Time |
|---|---|---|---|---|---|---|
| Naples 1 | (South Africa) Chad le Clos | (France) Energy Standard | 49.27 | (Sweden) Louise Hansson | (Canada) Toronto Titans | 56.02 |
| Naples 2 | (United States) Caeleb Dressel | (United States) Cali Condors | 49.03 | (United States) Kelsi Dahlia | (United States) Cali Condors | 55.63 |
| Naples 3 | (South Africa) Chad le Clos | (France) Energy Standard | 49.75 | (Belarus) Anastasiya Shkurdai | (France) Energy Standard | 56.53 |
| Naples 4 | (United States) Caeleb Dressel | (United States) Cali Condors | 48.53 | (United States) Kelsi Dahlia | (United States) Cali Condors | 55.22 |
| Naples 5 | (United States) Tom Shields | (United States) LA Current | 48.78 | (Sweden) Louise Hansson | (Canada) Toronto Titans | 55.26 |
| Naples 6 | (United States) Caeleb Dressel | (United States) Cali Condors | 48.71 | (United States) Kelsi Dahlia | (United States) Cali Condors | 55.40 |
| Naples 7 | (Germany) Marius Kusch | (Canada) Toronto Titans | 49.49 | (Sweden) Louise Hansson | (Canada) Toronto Titans | 55.42 |
| Naples 8 | (United States) Tom Shields | (United States) LA Current | 48.90 | (Australia) Emma McKeon | (United Kingdom) London Roar | 55.44 |
| Naples 9 | (Germany) Marius Kusch | (Canada) Toronto Titans | 49.73 | (Sweden) Louise Hansson | (Canada) Toronto Titans | 55.67 |
| Naples 10 | (Italy) Matteo Rivolta | (Italy) Aqua Centurions | 49.77 | (Italy) Elena di Liddo | (Italy) Aqua Centurions | 56.28 |
| Naples PI | (Poland) Jakub Majerski | (United States) New York Breakers | 49.98 | (United States) Aly Tetzloff | (Japan) Tokyo Frog Kings | 56.02 |
| Eindhoven PO 1 | (Brazil) Nicholas Santos | (Hungary) Team Iron | 50.36 | (United States) Kelsi Dahlia | (United States) Cali Condors | 55.45 |
| Eindhoven PO 2 | (United States) Tom Shields | (United States) LA Current | 49.47 | (Australia) Emma McKeon | (United Kingdom) London Roar | 55.57 |
| Eindhoven PO 3 | (Italy) Matteo Rivolta | (Italy) Aqua Centurions | 49.05 | (Sweden) Louise Hansson | (Canada) Toronto Titans | 55.91 |
| Eindhoven PO 4 | (United States) Tom Shields | (United States) LA Current | 49.36 | (United States) Kelsi Dahlia | (United States) Cali Condors | 54.89 |
| Eindhoven PO 5 | (United States) Tom Shields | (United States) LA Current | 48.99 | (Sweden) Sarah Sjöström | (France) Energy Standard | 55.51 |
| Eindhoven PO 6 | (Italy) Matteo Rivolta | (Italy) Aqua Centurions | 48.64 | (United States) Kelsi Dahlia | (United States) Cali Condors | 55.61 |
| Eindhoven F | (United States) Tom Shields | (United States) LA Current | 49.03 | (United States) Kelsi Dahlia | (United States) Cali Condors | 54.59 (WR) |

=== 200 m butterfly ===
| Meet | Men | | | Women | | |
| Meet | Winner | Team | Time | Winner | Team | Time |
|---|---|---|---|---|---|---|
| Naples 1 | (South Africa) Chad le Clos | (France) Energy Standard | 1:51.70 | (Canada) Summer McIntosh | (Canada) Toronto Titans | 2:06.61 |
| Naples 2 | (Japan) Daiya Seto | (Japan) Tokyo Frog Kings | 1:50.68 | (Russia) Svetlana Chimrova | (United States) New York Breakers | 2:05.62 |
| Naples 3 | (Japan) Teppei Morimoto | (United Kingdom) London Roar | 1:51.32 | (United Kingdom) Alys Thomas | (Hungary) Team Iron | 2:06.11 |
| Naples 4 | (United States) Tom Shields | (United States) LA Current | 1:50.24 | (United States) Kelsi Dahlia | (United States) Cali Condors | 2:03.95 |
| Naples 5 | (United States) Tom Shields | (United States) LA Current | 1:51.28 | (United Kingdom) Alys Thomas | (Hungary) Team Iron | 2:06.00 |
| Naples 6 | (Japan) Daiya Seto | (Japan) Tokyo Frog Kings | 1:50.28 | (United States) Kelsi Dahlia | (United States) Cali Condors | 2:04.75 |
| Naples 7 | (Italy) Alberto Razzetti | (Canada) Toronto Titans | 1:51.20 | (United States) Kelsi Dahlia | (United States) Cali Condors | 2:04.85 |
| Naples 8 | (Japan) Daiya Seto | (Japan) Tokyo Frog Kings | 1:49.41 | (United Kingdom) Keanna MacInnes | (Japan) Tokyo Frog Kings | 2:06.73 |
| Naples 9 | (Italy) Alberto Razzetti | (Canada) Toronto Titans | 1:51.15 | (Hungary) Zsuzsanna Jakabos | (United States) DC Trident | 2:06.56 |
| Naples 10 | (Japan) Daiya Seto | (Japan) Tokyo Frog Kings | 1:51.13 | (Russia) Svetlana Chimrova | (United States) New York Breakers | 2:04.65 |
| Naples PI | (Japan) Daiya Seto | (Japan) Tokyo Frog Kings | 1:51.29 | (Russia) Svetlana Chimrova | (United States) New York Breakers | 2:03.76 |
| Eindhoven PO 1 | (Chinese Taipei) Eddie Wang | (United States) Cali Condors | 1:52.00 | (United States) Kelsi Dahlia | (United States) Cali Condors | 2:05.44 |
| Eindhoven PO 2 | (Japan) Teppei Morimoto | (United Kingdom) London Roar | 1:51.80 | (United Kingdom) Laura Stephens | (Canada) Toronto Titans | 2:05.37 |
| Eindhoven PO 3 | (United States) Zach Harting | (United States) DC Trident | 1:51.74 | (United Kingdom) Laura Stephens | (Canada) Toronto Titans | 2:05.86 |
| Eindhoven PO 4 | (Chinese Taipei) Eddie Wang | (United States) Cali Condors | 1:50.83 | (United States) Hali Flickinger | (United States) Cali Condors | 2:04.62 |
| Eindhoven PO 5 | (Japan) Teppei Morimoto | (United Kingdom) London Roar | 1:51.27 | (Italy) Ilaria Bianchi | (United Kingdom) London Roar | 2:06.33 |
| Eindhoven PO 6 | (Chinese Taipei) Eddie Wang | (United States) Cali Condors | 1:50.99 | (United States) Hali Flickinger | (United States) Cali Condors | 2:04.28 |
| Eindhoven F | (Japan) Teppei Morimoto | (United Kingdom) London Roar | 1:50.44 | (United States) Hali Flickinger | (United States) Cali Condors | 2:03.73 |

=== 100 m individual medley ===
| Meet | Men | | | Women | | |
| Meet | Winner | Team | Time | Winner | Team | Time |
|---|---|---|---|---|---|---|
| Naples 1 | (Italy) Thomas Ceccon | (Italy) Aqua Centurions | 51.95 | (Sweden) Louise Hansson | (Canada) Toronto Titans | 58.82 |
| Naples 2 | (United States) Caeleb Dressel | (United States) Cali Condors | 51.01 | (United States) Beata Nelson | (United States) Cali Condors | 58.05 |
| Naples 3 | (Italy) Marco Orsi | (Hungary) Team Iron | 51.66 | (Canada) Mary-Sophie Harvey | (France) Energy Standard | 58.79 |
| Naples 4 | (United States) Caeleb Dressel | (United States) Cali Condors | 50.68 | (United States) Beata Nelson | (United States) Cali Condors | 58.02 |
| Naples 5 | (Italy) Marco Orsi | (Hungary) Team Iron | 51.32 | (Israel) Anastasia Gorbenko | (United States) LA Current | 58.08 |
| Naples 6 | (United Kingdom) Duncan Scott | (United Kingdom) London Roar | 51.92 | (United States) Beata Nelson | (United States) Cali Condors | 57.99 |
| Naples 7 | (Canada) Finlay Knox | (Canada) Toronto Titans | 51.77 | (United States) Beata Nelson | (United States) Cali Condors | 57.90 |
| Naples 8 | (United Kingdom) Duncan Scott | (United Kingdom) London Roar | 52.13 | (Israel) Anastasia Gorbenko | (United States) LA Current | 58.13 |
| Naples 9 | (Canada) Finlay Knox | (Canada) Toronto Titans | 51.91 | (Canada) Sydney Pickrem | (United Kingdom) London Roar | 58.40 |
| Naples 10 | (Italy) Marco Orsi | (Hungary) Team Iron | 51.51 | (Poland) Alicja Tchórz | (United States) New York Breakers | 58.43 |
| Naples PI | (Italy) Marco Orsi | (Hungary) Team Iron | 51.62 | (Italy) Costanza Cocconcelli | (Hungary) Team Iron | 58.54 |
| Eindhoven PO 1 | (Russia) Andrey Zhilkin | (France) Energy Standard | 52.33 | (United States) Beata Nelson | (United States) Cali Condors | 58.25 |
| Eindhoven PO 2 | (Italy) Thomas Ceccon | (Italy) Aqua Centurions | 51.85 | (Russia) Maria Kameneva | (Italy) Aqua Centurions | 58.15 |
| Eindhoven PO 3 | (Russia) Kliment Kolesnikov | (France) Energy Standard | 51.15 | (Russia) Maria Kameneva | (Italy) Aqua Centurions | 57.94 |
| Eindhoven PO 4 | (United States) Caeleb Dressel | (United States) Cali Condors | 51.67 | (France) Béryl Gastaldello | (United States) LA Current | 57.87 |
| Eindhoven PO 5 | (Russia) Kliment Kolesnikov | (France) Energy Standard | 51.51 | (Sweden) Sarah Sjöström | (France) Energy Standard | 57.94 |
| Eindhoven PO 6 | (Italy) Marco Orsi | (Hungary) Team Iron | 51.98 | (United States) Beata Nelson | (United States) Cali Condors | 57.94 |
| Eindhoven F | (United States) Caeleb Dressel | (United States) Cali Condors | 50.74 | (Sweden) Sarah Sjöström | (France) Energy Standard | 57.46 |

=== 200 m individual medley ===
| Meet | Men | | | Women | | |
| Meet | Winner | Team | Time | Winner | Team | Time |
|---|---|---|---|---|---|---|
| Naples 1 | (United States) Chase Kalisz | (Italy) Aqua Centurions | 1:53.64 | (Canada) Bailey Andison | (United States) DC Trident | 2:06.44 |
| Naples 2 | (Japan) Daiya Seto | (Japan) Tokyo Frog Kings | 1:52.98 | (United Kingdom) Abbie Wood | (United States) New York Breakers | 2:05.63 |
| Naples 3 | (United Kingdom) Duncan Scott | (United Kingdom) London Roar | 1:52.63 | (United Kingdom) Abbie Wood | (United States) New York Breakers | 2:05.98 |
| Naples 4 | (Greece) Andreas Vazaios | (United States) DC Trident | 1:52.85 | (Israel) Anastasia Gorbenko | (United States) LA Current | 2:05.04 |
| Naples 5 | (Greece) Andreas Vazaios | (United States) DC Trident | 1:52.30 | (Canada) Bailey Andison | (United States) DC Trident | 2:05.38 |
| Naples 6 | (Japan) Daiya Seto | (Japan) Tokyo Frog Kings | 1:51.12 | (Japan) Yui Ohashi | (Japan) Tokyo Frog Kings | 2:06.51 |
| Naples 7 | (Canada) Finlay Knox | (Canada) Toronto Titans | 1:52.32 | (United Kingdom) Abbie Wood | (United States) New York Breakers | 2:05.08 |
| Naples 8 | (United Kingdom) Duncan Scott | (United Kingdom) London Roar | 1:52.73 | (Canada) Mary-Sophie Harvey | (France) Energy Standard | 2:05.15 |
| Naples 9 | (Greece) Andreas Vazaios | (United States) DC Trident | 1:52.24 | (Canada) Sydney Pickrem | (United Kingdom) London Roar | 2:04.59 |
| Naples 10 | (Japan) Daiya Seto | (Japan) Tokyo Frog Kings | 1:52.59 | (United Kingdom) Abbie Wood (Japan) Yui Ohashi | (United States) New York Breakers (Japan) Tokyo Frog Kings | 2:05.45 |
| Naples PI | (Greece) Andreas Vazaios | (United States) DC Trident | 1:51.15 | (Japan) Yui Ohashi | (Japan) Tokyo Frog Kings | 2:04.86 |
| Eindhoven PO 1 | (Greece) Andreas Vazaios | (United States) DC Trident | 1:53.11 | (United States) Beata Nelson | (United States) Cali Condors | 2:06.20 |
| Eindhoven PO 2 | (Italy) Alberto Razzetti | (Canada) Toronto Titans | 1:52.86 | (Canada) Sydney Pickrem | (United Kingdom) London Roar | 2:06.46 |
| Eindhoven PO 3 | (Italy) Alberto Razzetti | (Canada) Toronto Titans | 1:52.10 | (Canada) Mary-Sophie Harvey | (France) Energy Standard | 2:05.67 |
| Eindhoven PO 4 | (United Kingdom) Duncan Scott | (United Kingdom) London Roar | 1:52.35 | (Canada) Sydney Pickrem | (United Kingdom) London Roar | 2:05.29 |
| Eindhoven PO 5 | (United Kingdom) Duncan Scott | (United Kingdom) London Roar | 1:52.23 | (Canada) Sydney Pickrem | (United Kingdom) London Roar | 2:06.50 |
| Eindhoven PO 6 | (Italy) Alberto Razzetti | (Canada) Toronto Titans | 1:52.38 | (Japan) Rika Omoto | (Italy) Aqua Centurions | 2:06.45 |
| Eindhoven F | (United Kingdom) Duncan Scott | (United Kingdom) London Roar | 1:51.53 | (Canada) Sydney Pickrem | (United Kingdom) London Roar | 2:05.79 |

=== 400 m individual medley ===
| Meet | Men | | | Women | | |
| Meet | Winner | Team | Time | Winner | Team | Time |
|---|---|---|---|---|---|---|
| Naples 1 | (Russia) Ilya Borodin | (Italy) Aqua Centurions | 4:02.67 | (Canada) Summer McIntosh | (Canada) Toronto Titans | 4:30.05 |
| Naples 2 | (Japan) Daiya Seto | (Japan) Tokyo Frog Kings | 4:01.10 | (United Kingdom) Abbie Wood | (United States) New York Breakers | 4:29.88 |
| Naples 3 | (Australia) Brendon Smith | (United States) New York Breakers | 4:03.96 | (United Kingdom) Abbie Wood | (United States) New York Breakers | 4:29.89 |
| Naples 4 | (Russia) Ilya Borodin | (Italy) Aqua Centurions | 3:59.57 | (Canada) Bailey Andison | (United States) DC Trident | 4:26.31 |
| Naples 5 | (Italy) Alberto Razzetti | (Canada) Toronto Titans | 4:01.57 | (Canada) Bailey Andison | (United States) DC Trident | 4:26.39 |
| Naples 6 | (Japan) Daiya Seto | (Japan) Tokyo Frog Kings | 3:59.01 | (Japan) Yui Ohashi | (Japan) Tokyo Frog Kings | 4:31.60 |
| Naples 7 | (Italy) Alberto Razzetti | (Canada) Toronto Titans | 4:01.59 | (United Kingdom) Abbie Wood | (United States) New York Breakers | 4:27.79 |
| Naples 8 | (Japan) Daiya Seto | (Japan) Tokyo Frog Kings | 4:00.06 | (United Kingdom) Katie Shanahan | (United Kingdom) London Roar | 4:31.83 |
| Naples 9 | (United Kingdom) Duncan Scott | (United Kingdom) London Roar | 4:02.34 | (Canada) Bailey Andison | (United States) DC Trident | 4:27.23 |
| Naples 10 | (Japan) Daiya Seto | (Japan) Tokyo Frog Kings | 3:58.65 | (Japan) Yui Ohashi | (Japan) Tokyo Frog Kings | 4:28.33 |
| Naples PI | (Australia) Brendon Smith | (United States) New York Breakers | 3:59.33 | (Canada) Bailey Andison | (United States) DC Trident | 4:27.11 |
| Eindhoven PO 1 | (Greece) Andreas Vazaios | (United States) DC Trident | 4:05.06 | (Canada) Bailey Andison | (United States) DC Trident | 4:29.60 |
| Eindhoven PO 2 | (Russia) Ilya Borodin | (Italy) Aqua Centurions | 4:01.75 | (Canada) Summer McIntosh | (Canada) Toronto Titans | 4:27.87 |
| Eindhoven PO 3 | (Russia) Ilya Borodin | (Italy) Aqua Centurions | 4:01.72 | (Canada) Bailey Andison | (United States) DC Trident | 4:26.75 |
| Eindhoven PO 4 | (United Kingdom) Duncan Scott | (United Kingdom) London Roar | 4:00.37 | (Canada) Sydney Pickrem | (United Kingdom) London Roar | 4:30.76 |
| Eindhoven PO 5 | (United Kingdom) Duncan Scott | (United Kingdom) London Roar | 4:01.80 | (Canada) Sydney Pickrem | (United Kingdom) London Roar | 4:29.21 |
| Eindhoven PO 6 | (Russia) Ilya Borodin | (Italy) Aqua Centurions | 4:03.20 | (Canada) Tessa Cieplucha | (Canada) Toronto Titans | 4:28.97 |
| Eindhoven F | (United Kingdom) Duncan Scott | (United Kingdom) London Roar | 4:03.24 | (United States) Hali Flickinger | (United States) Cali Condors | 4:29.92 |

=== 50 m skins ===
| Meet | Men | | | | Women | | | |
| Meet | Winner | Team | Stroke | Time | Winner | Team | Stroke | Time |
|---|---|---|---|---|---|---|---|---|
| Naples 1 | (South Africa) Chad le Clos | (France) Energy Standard | Butterfly | 23.82 | (Sweden) Sarah Sjöström | (France) Energy Standard | Freestyle | 24.79 |
| Naples 2 | (United States) Coleman Stewart | (United States) Cali Condors | Backstroke | 23.30 | (United States) Beata Nelson | (United States) Cali Condors | Backstroke | 27.67 |
| Naples 3 | (Brazil) Vini Lanza | (United Kingdom) London Roar | Butterfly | 24.14 | (Sweden) Sarah Sjöström | (France) Energy Standard | Freestyle | 24.22 |
| Naples 4 | (United States) Caeleb Dressel | (United States) Cali Condors | Freestyle | 21.79 | (United States) Kelsi Dahlia | (United States) Cali Condors | Butterfly | 25.66 |
| Naples 5 | (Netherlands) Thom de Boer | (Hungary) Team Iron | Freestyle | 23.36 | (Sweden) Louise Hansson | (Canada) Toronto Titans | Butterfly | 26.27 |
| Naples 6 | (Japan) Katsumi Nakamura | (United Kingdom) London Roar | Freestyle | 22.93 | (United States) Kelsi Dahlia | (United States) Cali Condors | Butterfly | 25.80 |
| Naples 7 | (Romania) Robert Glință | (Hungary) Team Iron | Backstroke | 24.02 | (United States) Kelsi Dahlia | (United States) Cali Condors | Butterfly | 26.01 |
| Naples 8 | (United States) Tom Shields | (United States) LA Current | Butterfly | 23.46 | (Canada) Ingrid Wilm | (United States) LA Current | Backstroke | 26.92 |
| Naples 9 | (Russia) Evgeny Rylov | (France) Energy Standard | Backstroke | 24.23 | (Australia) Minna Atherton | (United Kingdom) London Roar | Backstroke | 27.18 |
| Naples 10 | (Netherlands) Thom de Boer | (Hungary) Team Iron | Freestyle | 22.86 | (Netherlands) Ranomi Kromowidjojo | (Hungary) Team Iron | Butterfly | 26.86 |
| Naples PI | (Netherlands) Thom de Boer | (Hungary) Team Iron | Freestyle | 22.72 | (United States) Miranda Tucker | (Japan) Tokyo Frog Kings | Breaststroke | 30.34 |
| Eindhoven PO 1 | (Netherlands) Thom de Boer | (Hungary) Team Iron | Freestyle | 22.76 | (Netherlands) Maaike de Waard | (United States) Cali Condors | Backstroke | 27.87 |
| Eindhoven PO 2 | (Italy) Matteo Rivolta | (Italy) Aqua Centurions | Butterfly | 23.39 | (Israel) Anastasia Gorbenko | (United States) LA Current | Breaststroke | 30.55 |
| Eindhoven PO 3 | (Russia) Kliment Kolesnikov | (France) Energy Standard | Freestyle | 22.40 | (Sweden) Sarah Sjöström | (France) Energy Standard | Freestyle | 23.98 |
| Eindhoven PO 4 | (United States) Ryan Murphy | (United States) LA Current | Backstroke | 24.32 | (Australia) Minna Atherton | (United Kingdom) London Roar | Backstroke | 27.19 |
| Eindhoven PO 5 | (United States) Ryan Murphy | (United States) LA Current | Backstroke | 24.22 | (Canada) Ingrid Wilm | (United States) LA Current | Backstroke | 27.67 |
| Eindhoven PO 6 | (Romania) Robert Glință | (Hungary) Team Iron | Backstroke | 24.25 | (United States) Kelsi Dahlia | (United States) Cali Condors | Butterfly | 26.13 |
| Eindhoven F | (United States) Caeleb Dressel | (United States) Cali Condors | Butterfly | 23.05 | (Australia) Minna Atherton | (United Kingdom) London Roar | Backstroke | 27.24 |

=== 4 × 100 m freestyle relay ===
| Meet | Men | | Women | |
| Meet | Team | Time | Team | Time |
|---|---|---|---|---|
| Naples 1 | (Italy) Aqua Centurions | 3:06.46 | (Canada) Toronto Titans | 3:29.79 |
| Naples 2 | (United States) Cali Condors | 3:06.98 | (United States) LA Current | 3:31.29 |
| Naples 3 | (United States) New York Breakers | 3:07.02 | (France) Energy Standard | 3:31.23 |
| Naples 4 | (Italy) Aqua Centurions | 3:06.08 | (United States) LA Current | 3:29.44 |
| Naples 5 | (Canada) Toronto Titans | 3:06.60 | (Canada) Toronto Titans | 3:28.01 |
| Naples 6 | (United Kingdom) London Roar | 3:05.05 | (United States) Cali Condors | 3:29.74 |
| Naples 7 | (Canada) Toronto Titans | 3:06.96 | (Canada) Toronto Titans | 3:28.56 |
| Naples 8 | (United Kingdom) London Roar | 3:05.84 | (France) Energy Standard | 3:27.65 |
| Naples 9 | (United Kingdom) London Roar | 3:06.50 | (France) Energy Standard | 3:28.88 |
| Naples 10 | (Italy) Aqua Centurions | 3:06.37 | (Hungary) Team Iron | 3:30.21 |
| Naples PI | (United States) New York Breakers | 3:06.75 | (United States) DC Trident | 3:28.79 |
| Eindhoven PO 1 | (United States) Cali Condors | 3:08.46 | (France) Energy Standard | 3:29.12 |
| Eindhoven PO 2 | (United Kingdom) London Roar | 3:05.43 | (United Kingdom) London Roar | 3:28.04 |
| Eindhoven PO 3 | (Italy) Aqua Centurions | 3:06.67 | (France) Energy Standard | 3:28.55 |
| Eindhoven PO 4 | (United Kingdom) London Roar | 3:04.55 | (United States) LA Current | 3:27.44 |
| Eindhoven PO 5 | (United Kingdom) London Roar | 3:04.47 | (France) Energy Standard | 3:27.73 |
| Eindhoven PO 6 | (Italy) Aqua Centurions | 3:06.64 | (Canada) Toronto Titans | 3:28.78 |
| Eindhoven F | (United States) Cali Condors | 3:04.82 | (France) Energy Standard | 3:27.87 |

=== 4 × 100 m medley relay ===
| Meet | Men | | Women | |
| Meet | Team | Time | Team | Time |
|---|---|---|---|---|
| Naples 1 | (France) Energy Standard | 3:24.05 | (Italy) Aqua Centurions | 3:50.81 |
| Naples 2 | (United States) Cali Condors | 3:22.72 | (United States) Cali Condors | 3:50.25 |
| Naples 3 | (France) Energy Standard | 3:24.05 | (France) Energy Standard | 3:48.43 |
| Naples 4 | (United States) Cali Condors | 3:20.68 | (United States) Cali Condors | 3:48.68 |
| Naples 5 | (Canada) Toronto Titans | 3:23.67 | (Canada) Toronto Titans | 3:48.42 |
| Naples 6 | (United States) Cali Condors | 3:21.29 | (United States) Cali Condors | 3:47.70 |
| Naples 7 | (United States) Cali Condors | 3:23.05 | (United States) Cali Condors | 3:48.02 |
| Naples 8 | (France) Energy Standard | 3:22.19 | (United Kingdom) London Roar | 3:48.04 |
| Naples 9 | (France) Energy Standard | 3:22.38 | (United Kingdom) London Roar | 3:48.58 |
| Naples 10 | (Italy) Aqua Centurions | 3:23.51 | (Italy) Aqua Centurions | 3:49.11 |
| Naples PI | (Japan) Tokyo Frog Kings | 3:22.76 | (Hungary) Team Iron | 3:49.91 |
| Eindhoven PO 1 | (United States) Cali Condors | 3:23.42 | (United States) Cali Condors | 3:48.63 |
| Eindhoven PO 2 | (United Kingdom) London Roar | 3:23.58 | (United Kingdom) London Roar | 3:47.17 |
| Eindhoven PO 3 | (France) Energy Standard | 3:22.25 | (Canada) Toronto Titans | 3:49.09 |
| Eindhoven PO 4 | (United States) Cali Condors | 3:22.44 | (United Kingdom) London Roar | 3:46.28 |
| Eindhoven PO 5 | (France) Energy Standard | 3:21.36 | (United Kingdom) London Roar | 3:47.48 |
| Eindhoven PO 6 | (Italy) Aqua Centurions | 3:21.56 | (United States) Cali Condors | 3:48.63 |
| Eindhoven F | (United States) Cali Condors | 3:19.64 | (France) Energy Standard | 3:48.11 |

=== 4 × 100 m mixed medley relay ===
| Meet | Team | Time |
|---|---|---|
| Naples 1 | (Canada) Toronto Titans | 3:35.89 |
| Naples 2 | (United States) Cali Condors | 3:35.87 |
| Naples 3 | (France) Energy Standard | 3:35.89 |
| Naples 4 | (United States) LA Current | 3:33.31 |
| Naples 5 | (United States) LA Current | 3:34.15 |
| Naples 6 | (United Kingdom) London Roar | 3:35.57 |
| Naples 7 | (Canada) Toronto Titans | 3:35.51 |
| Naples 8 | (France) Energy Standard | 3:31.96 |
| Naples 9 | (France) Energy Standard | 3:34.49 |
| Naples 10 | (Italy) Aqua Centurions | 3:35.96 |
| Naples PI | (Hungary) Team Iron | 3:35.50 |
| Eindhoven PO 1 | (France) Energy Standard | 3:32.62 |
| Eindhoven PO 2 | (United States) LA Current | 3:34.70 |
| Eindhoven PO 3 | (France) Energy Standard | 3:33.11 |
| Eindhoven PO 4 | (United States) Cali Condors | 3:33.79 |
| Eindhoven PO 5 | (France) Energy Standard | 3:33.32 |
| Eindhoven PO 6 | (United States) Cali Condors | 3:34.92 |
| Eindhoven F | (France) Energy Standard | 3:30.94 |

== World Records ==
The following world records were set as a part of competition during the 2021 International Swimming League.

| No. | Sex | Event | Time | Athlete | Country | Team | Date | Ref |
|---|---|---|---|---|---|---|---|---|
| 1 | Male | 100 m backstroke | 48.33 | Coleman Stewart | United States | (United States) Cali Condors | 29 August 2021 | |
| 2 | Male | 100 m breaststroke | 55.32 | Ilya Shymanovich | Belarus | (France) Energy Standard | 19 November 2021 | |
| 3 | Male | 100 m breaststroke | 55.28 | Ilya Shymanovich | Belarus | (France) Energy Standard | 26 November 2021 | |
| 4 | Female | 100 m butterfly | 54.59 | Kelsi Dahlia | United States | (United States) Cali Condors | 3 December 2021 | |
