= Coleman Stewart =

American swimmer

Personal information
- National team: United States
- Born: March 3, 1998 (age 28) York, Pennsylvania, U.S.
- Height: 6 ft 0 in (183 cm)
- Weight: 170 lb (77 kg)

Sport
- Sport: Swimming
- Strokes: Backstroke, butterfly, freestyle
- Club: Cali Condors; Wolfpack Elite
- College team: NC State
Medal record
Men's swimming
Representing the United States
Event	1st	2nd	3rd
Universiade	1	0	1
Total	1	0	1
Universiade
Gold medal – first place	2019 Naples	4×100 m medley
Bronze medal – third place	2019 Naples	100 m butterfly
Representing the NC State Wolfpack
Event	1st	2nd	3rd
NCAA Championships	2	6	1
Total	2	6	1
NCAA Championships
Gold medal – first place	2018 Minneapolis	100 y backstroke
Gold medal – first place	2018 Minneapolis	4×100 y freestyle
Silver medal – second place	2018 Minneapolis	4×50 y freestyle
Silver medal – second place	2018 Minneapolis	4×100 y medley
Silver medal – second place	2019 Austin	100 y backstroke
Silver medal – second place	2019 Austin	100 y butterfly
Silver medal – second place	2019 Austin	4×100 y freestyle
Silver medal – second place	2019 Austin	4×200 y freestyle
Bronze medal – third place	2019 Austin	4×50 y medley

Coleman Stewart (born March 3, 1998) is a retired American swimmer. He is the former world record holder in the short course 100 meter backstroke. At the 2019 World University Games, he won a gold medal as part of the 4×100 metre medley relay, swimming backstroke in the prelims heats, and a bronze medal in the 100 meter butterfly. He competed in the International Swimming League as part of the Cali Condors.

== Career ==
=== 2016–2019 ===
==== 2016 US Olympic Trials ====
In 2016, Stewart placed 78th in the 200 meter backstroke with a 2:04.74 and 135th in the 100 meter backstroke with a time of 57.57 seconds at the 2016 US Olympic Trials in Omaha, Nebraska.

==== 2019 World University Games ====
2019 World University Games
Gold medal – first place	4×100 m medley	3:33.02 (h)
Bronze medal – third place	100 m butterfly	52.11

At the 2019 World University Games held at Piscina Felice Scandone in Naples, Italy in July 2019, Stewart placed 8th in the 50 meter butterfly with a time of 24.00 seconds, won the bronze medal in the 100 meter butterfly with a time of 52.11 seconds, and split a 53.85 for the backstroke leg of the 4×100 meter medley relay in the prelims heats and won a gold medal in the event when the finals relay, on which Justin Ress substituted in for Stewart, finished first in 3:33.02.

=== 2021 ===
==== 2020 US Olympic Trials ====
At the 2020 US Olympic Trials in Omaha, Nebraska, and held in 2021 due to the COVID-19 pandemic, Stewart placed 10th in the 100 meter backstroke on the second day of competition with a time of 53.91 seconds. In the final of the 100 meter freestyle three days later, Stewart placed eighth with a time of 48.51 seconds. For the final of the 100 meter butterfly two days later, he tied Trenton Julian for fourth-place with a time of 51.78 seconds.

==== 2021 International Swimming League ====
On August 29, 2021, Stewart broke the world record in the short course 100 meter backstroke at Piscina Felice Scandone in Naples, Italy as part of regular season competition during the 2021 International Swimming League representing the Cali Condors. His world record time of 48.33 seconds in the event broke the world record of 48.58 seconds set in 2020 by Kliment Kolesnikov of Russia. One day earlier, Stewart broke the American record in the short course 100 meter backstroke with a time of 48.91 seconds when he swam the first, backstroke, leg of the 4×100 meter medley relay. Come the final match of the 2021 season in December, Stewart set a new Americas record and American record in the 4×100 meter medley relay with teammates Nick Fink (breaststroke), Caeleb Dressel (butterfly), and Justin Ress (freestyle) in a combined relay final time of 3:19.64.

=== 2022 ===
==== Pro Swim Series – San Antonio ====
Stewart swam a 52.42 in the prelims heats of the 100 meter butterfly at the 2022 Pro Swim Series in San Antonio, Texas, held at Northside Swim Center in March and April, qualifying for the final later in the second day of competition ranking second behind Shaine Casas. In the final he placed third, finishing 0.84 seconds behind first-place finisher Shaine Casas with a time of 51.93 seconds. In the prelims session the following morning, he qualified for the final of 100 meter backstroke with a time of 55.44 seconds and overall second-rank. He placed second in the final, swimming a 54.43 to finish less than a second behind Shaine Casas. He qualified for the b-final of the 100 meter freestyle the following morning, ranking thirteenth overall with a time of 50.06 seconds, in which he went on to swim a 50.39 and finish fifth, thirteenth-place overall.

==== 2022 International Team Trials ====
The first day of the 2022 US International Team Trials in Greensboro, North Carolina, April 26, 2022, Stewart swam a 49.26 in the preliminary heats of the 100 meter freestyle, qualifying for the evening b-final ranking 13th overall. He near-equaled his time from the prelims in the b-final, swimming a 49.35 to finish fourth and place 12th overall. Day two of competition, he qualified for the final of the 50 meter butterfly with an overall rank of sixth and a time of 23.89 seconds in the morning prelims heats. In the final, he swam a time of 23.91 seconds to place seventh. With a time of 52.40 seconds in the 100 meter butterfly preliminary heats on day three, he qualified for the b-final of the event ranking tenth. He did not swim in the event's finals.

== World records ==
=== Short course meters (25 m pool) ===
No.	Event	Time	Meet	Location	Venue	Date	Status	Ref
1	100 m backstroke	48.33	2021 International Swimming League	Naples, Italy	Piscina Felice Scandone	August 29, 2021	Current	

== Continental and national records ==
=== Short course meters (25 m pool) ===
No.	Event	Time		Meet	Location	Date	Type	Status	Notes	Ref
1	100 m backstroke	48.91	r	2021 International Swimming League	Naples, Italy	August 28, 2021	NR	Former		
2	100 m backstroke (2)	48.33		2021 International Swimming League	Naples, Italy	August 29, 2021	AM, NR	Current	WR	
3	4×100 m medley relay	3:19.64		2021 International Swimming League	Eindhoven, Netherlands	December 3, 2021	AM, NR	Current		

Legend: WR – World record; AM – Americas record; NR – American record;
Records not set in finals: h – heat; sf – semifinal; r – relay 1st leg; rh – relay heat 1st leg; b – B final; † – en route to final mark; so – swim-off; tt – time trial

Records
Preceded by (Russia) Kliment Kolesnikov	Men's 100 meter backstroke world record holder (short course); 29 August 2021 – present	Succeeded by Incumbent
