= Piscina Felice Scandone =

Swimming venue in Naples, Italy

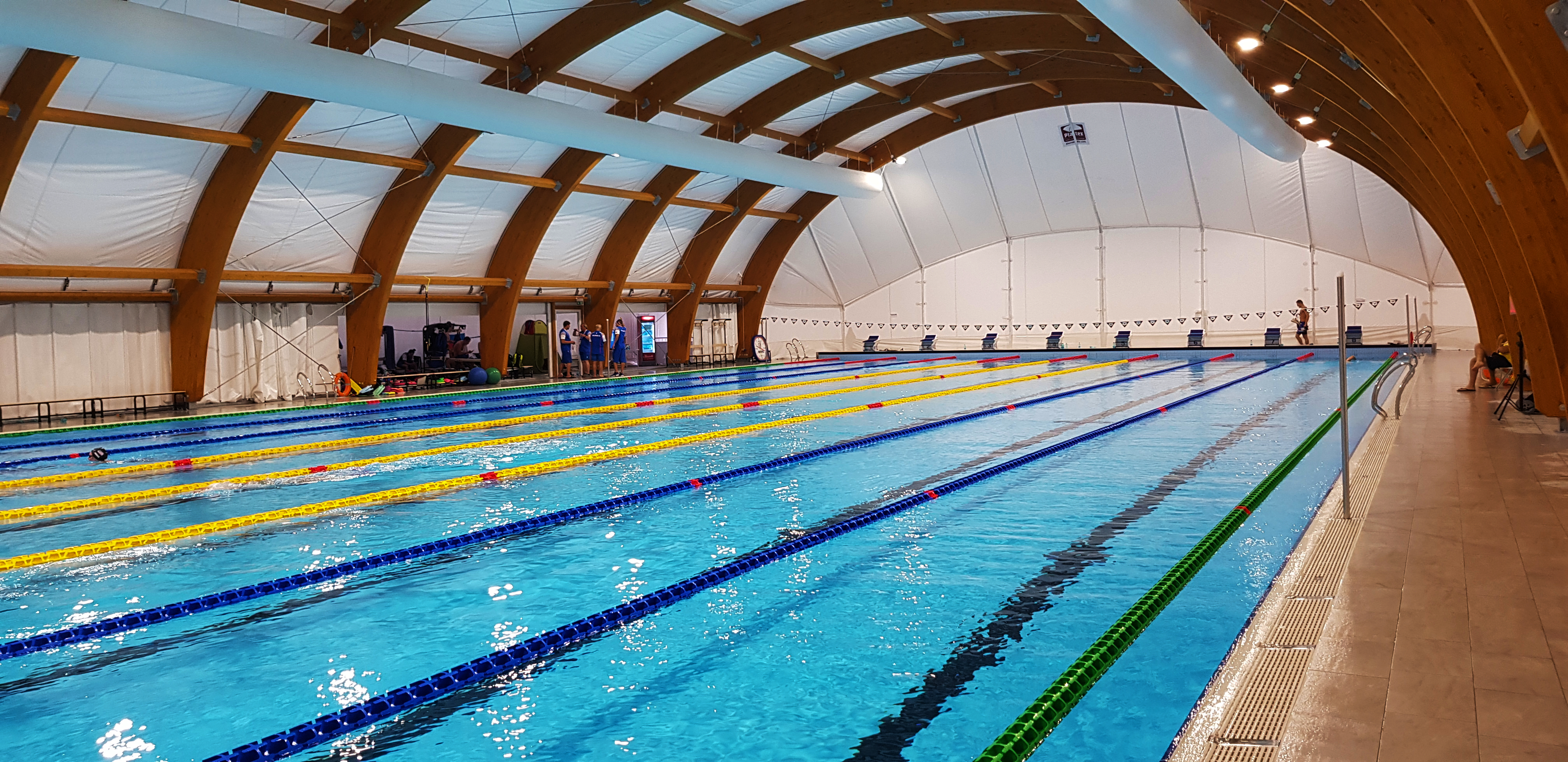
- Warm-up pool in 2019
- Interactive map of Piscina Felice Scandone
- Full name: Piscina Felice Scandone
- Address: Naples, Italy
- Coordinates: 40.8219°N 14.1808°E
- Owner: Naples Municipality
- Capacity: 4,500
- Pool size: 50 m × 21 m (164 ft × 69 ft)

Construction
- Built: 1960–1963
- Opened: 1963

Tenants
- Rari Nantes Napoli; Zurich Barbato Cesport

Piscina Felice Scandone is a swimming pool complex located in Naples, Italy. The complex was named after Italian sports journalist and enthusiast Felice Scandone, who reported on sports in the Naples area. Construction of the venue began in 1960 and in 1963 the venue opened. It is owned and maintained by the municipality of Naples.

== History, design, and construction ==
In the late 1920s, Felice Scandone started making an impact on the Naples sports scene by publishing articles about sports in the city, an activity which he continued for decades. When the municipality decided to build a pool, called a "piscina" in the Italian language, they chose to name it after Felice Scandone in part due to his fostering of sports culture in the city. The pool was designed with hosting of the Mediterranean Games taken into account, construction of the pool began in 1960 and was finished in 1963, just in time to host aquatics events for the 1963 Mediterranean Games. After the Mediterranean Games, the venue went unused for a number of years before re-opening in 1983.

Following decades of use by the general public and in sporting competitions, the complex was renovated in 2019 with spectators and competitors in mind per the guidance of FISU and finished in time for hosting the 2019 Summer Universiade. Renovations included a new lighting system to make viewing easier and the addition of a covered outdoor Olympic-size warm-up pool with partially retractable roof for athletes to use while competitions take place in the pool in the main building. Later in the year, additional infrastructure in the form of a removable bulkhead was donated to the complex by the International Swimming League so the pool could be converted for use by the league, and more generally, in 25-metre (short course) competitions.

== Technical features ==
=== Main building ===
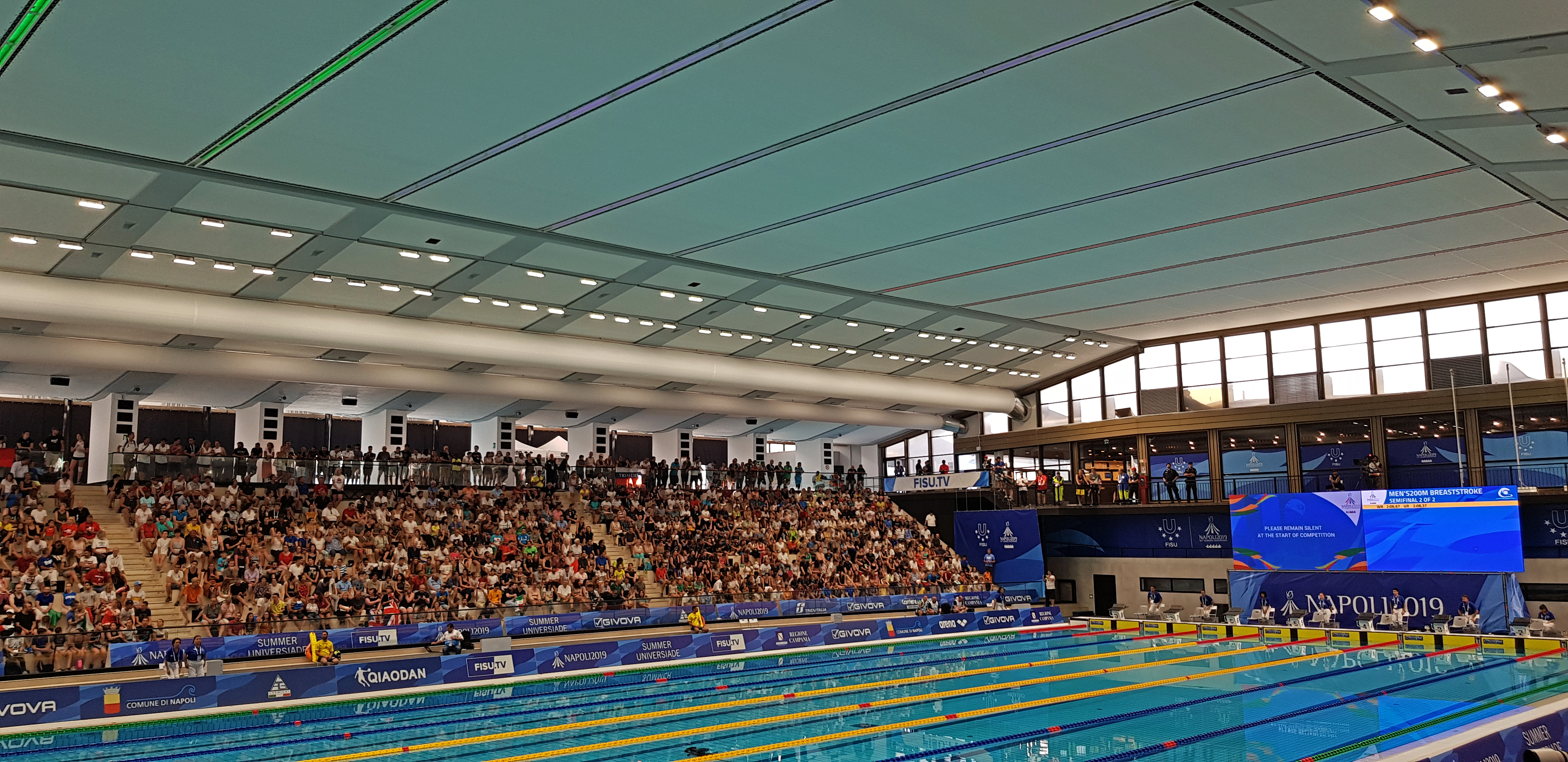
Main pool fitted for swimming at the 2019 Summer Universiade

The main three-story-tall building houses an Olympic-size swimming pool 50 metres in length and 21 metres in width, which is open to use by the general public and utilized in various sporting competitions including in water polo and swimming. This main pool is a fixed-wall pool measuring 50 metres in length, meaning the length of the pool cannot be adjusted to accommodate two 25-metre-long racing courses placed end-to-end simultaneously. The building is approximately 14,000 square meters and parking and green areas are available for workers, users, and visitors. Two stands for spectators are arranged parallel to the length of the main pool, are composed of white marble, and can seat up to 4,500 individuals. A removable bulkhead can be inserted to provide a 25-metre long, short course, racing format. Lighting fixtures in the facility were installed in 2019, which included anti-glare technology to minimize glare for those watching competition in the pool and on a high-definition television screen by the pool.

=== Warm-up area ===
A permanent outdoor Olympic-size swimming pool is housed in a tensile structure with retractable sheeting, which architecturally is a tunnel in shape. The steel frame tensile structure has structural support in the form of laminated wood, and allows for the expansion and contraction of the roof structure in different temperatures while minimizing the risk of cracking and roof fracture due to excessive heat or cold. The retractable sheeting provides protection for facility users from the natural elements and can be retracted to allow for natural lighting. Pool dimensions are 50 metres long by 21 metres wide and 2 metres deep. A passageway connects the warm-up pool to the main building, joining one of the short, 21 metre, ends of the main pool to a long, 50 metre, side of the warm-up pool. During competitions, the warm-up area is used by athletes for warm-up and training. Outside of competition, the area is used for training and general usage by the public.

== Operations ==
=== Temporary closures ===
In October 2014, the complex temporarily closed due to technical issues.

=== Sports teams based at the pool ===
Since it opened in 1963, Piscina Felice Scandone has served as the home for water polo clubs CN Posillipo and Canottieri Napoli, and starting in the 2010s it became the base of operations for clubs AS Acquachiara, Rari Nantes Napoli, and Zurich Barbato Cesport.

== Notable events ==
- International Swimming League: 2019, 2021
- LEN Euroleague: 2004–05
- Mediterranean Games: 1963
- Universiade: 2019

== World records ==
The following includes world records that have been set at Piscina Felice Scandone.

Sport	Event	Format	Date	Time/Score	Name	Nationality	Competition	Ref
Swimming	100 metre backstroke (men's)	short course	29 August 2021	48.33 seconds	Coleman Stewart	American	2021 International Swimming League	

== See also ==
- List of sports venues named after individuals
