= Hannah Price =

British physicist

- Education: University of Cambridge; Malvern St James
- Scientific career
- Workplaces: University of Birmingham; University of Trento
- Thesis: Topological phenomena in ultracold atomic gases (2013)
- Website: Hannah M Price

Hannah Price is a British physicist and Professor of Theoretical Physics at the University of Birmingham. Her research considers topological phases in photonics and gases. She was awarded the 2018 James Clerk Maxwell Medal and Prize of the Institute of Physics.

== Early life and education ==
Price attended Malvern St James for high school and completed sixth form in Italy. She studied natural sciences at the University of Cambridge. She remained in Cambridge for her doctoral research, where she studied topological phenomena in ultracold gases. At Cambridge she was Captain of the competitive Wine Tasting Society. After Cambridge she became interested in photonics and quantum optics, and completed a Marie Skłodowska-Curie Fellowship at the Pitaevskii Center on Bose-Einstein Condensation in the University of Trento. In Trento she studied quantum phenomena using ultracold atoms, including the Quantum Hall effect.

== Research and career ==
In 2017 Price joined the University of Birmingham. Her research considers materials for quantum technologies, including ultracold atomic gases and topological systems. She combines photonics and quantum optics to simulate and understand quantum phenomena.

== Awards and honours ==
- 2018 Institute of Physics James Clerk Maxwell Medal and Prize
- 2018 University of Birmingham University Founders' Award

== Select publications ==
- Michael Lohse; Christian Schweizer; Hannah M Price; Oded Zilberberg; Immanuel Bloch (1 January 2018). "Exploring 4D quantum Hall physics with a 2D topological charge pump". Nature. 553 (7686): 55–58. arXiv:1705.08371. doi:10.1038/nature25000. ISSN 1476-4687. PMID 29300006. Wikidata Q50196359.
- Tomoki Ozawa; Hannah M. Price; Nathan Goldman; Oded Zilberberg; Iacopo Carusotto (15 April 2016). "Synthetic dimensions in integrated photonics: From optical isolation to four-dimensional quantum Hall physics". Physical Review A. 93 (4). arXiv:1510.03910. Bibcode:2016PhRvA..93d3827O. doi:10.1103/physreva.93.043827. ISSN 2469-9926. Wikidata Q59446949.
- Hannah M Price; Oded Zilberberg; T Ozawa; Iacopo Carusotto; N Goldman (3 November 2015). "Four-Dimensional Quantum Hall Effect with Ultracold Atoms". Physical Review Letters. 115 (19) 195303. arXiv:1505.04387. doi:10.1103/physrevlett.115.195303. ISSN 0031-9007. PMID 26588394. Wikidata Q59446971.
