= Beata Nelson =

American swimmer

Personal information
- Nationality: American
- Born: September 2, 1998 (age 27)

Sport
- Sport: Swimming
- Strokes: Backstroke, butterfly, freestyle
- Club: Cali Condors (ISL)
- College team: University of Wisconsin–Madison

Beata Nelson (born September 2, 1998) is an American swimmer. She specializes in short course sprint events. Known for her powerful underwater dolphin kicks, Nelson is the former American record holder in the women's 100 SC Individual Medley event.
