= Justin Ress =

American swimmer (born 1997)

Personal information
- Born: August 3, 1997 (age 28) Cary, North Carolina, U.S.
- Height: 6 ft 5 in (196 cm)
- Weight: 209 lb (95 kg)

Sport
- Sport: Swimming
- Strokes: Backstroke, freestyle
- Club: Cali Condors
- College team: North Carolina State University
Medal record
Men's swimming
Representing the United States
World Championships (LC)
Gold medal – first place	2022 Budapest	50 m backstroke
Gold medal – first place	2022 Budapest	4×100 m freestyle
Silver medal – second place	2023 Fukuoka	50 m backstroke
Bronze medal – third place	2023 Fukuoka	4×100 m freestyle
World University Games
Gold medal – first place	2017 Taipei	100 m backstroke
Gold medal – first place	2017 Taipei	4×100 m freestyle
Gold medal – first place	2017 Taipei	4×100 m medley
Gold medal – first place	2019 Naples	50 m backstroke
Gold medal – first place	2019 Naples	4×100 m medley
Silver medal – second place	2017 Taipei	50 m backstroke
Bronze medal – third place	2019 Naples	100 m backstroke

Justin Ress (born August 3, 1997) is an American swimmer. As a member of the USA national team Justin won the gold medal in the 50 meter backstroke at the 2022 FINA World Championships and was a member of the USA gold medal-winning 4X100 free relay. He was also a key part of the USA team that defeated Australia in the resumption of the Duel in the Pool series in 2022. Ress competed as a member of the Cali Condors of the International Swimming League from 2019 to 2021 and looks forward to resumption of ISL in the near future. Ress was US national champion in the 100 backstroke in 2022 and 50 backstroke in 2017 after which he competed in the men's 50 meter backstroke event at the 2017 World Aquatics Championships. Ress swam collegiately for North Carolina State University where he was a 3-time NCAA champion, 21-time NCAA All-American, and 11-time ACC champion. In his first year at school he won the 2016 ACC Freshman of the Year award.

== Early life ==
Ress is a native of Cary, North Carolina who attended Cary High School. He swam for Cary High School and trained with the Marlins of Raleigh, North Carolina. In 2014, he was a USA Swimming Scholastic All-American.

== Career ==
At the 2017 US Nationals Ress won the 50 meter backstroke securing his spot on the World Championship roster. He finished in 24.41 to set a new championship record and beat the past two Olympic Champions in the 100 meter backstroke, Matt Grevers and Ryan Murphy, in the process. At the 2017 World Aquatics Championships in Budapest, Hungary Ress place 6th in the 50 meter backstroke. Ress was the runner up in the 50 meter backstroke (24.31) and finished third in the 100 meter backstroke (53.26), both personal bests, at the U.S. National Championships. His third-place finish in the 100 meter backstroke got him a spot on the 2018 Pan Pac team.

At the 2019 World University Games Ress earned a bronze medal in the 100 meter backstroke with a time of 53.81. He later tied for gold in the 50 meter backstroke with a time of 24.48. Ress ended his program with the 4×100 meter medley relay, where he led off Team USA in 53.31 en route to a gold medal.

In 2019 he was a member of the inaugural International Swimming League representing the Cali Condors, who finished third place in the final match in Las Vegas, Nevada in December. Ress showed his versatility by competed in sprint freestyle, backstroke, butterfly, and relays throughout the season.

At the 2020 Olympic Trials, Justin swam the 50 Freestyle and the 100 Backstroke. In the 100 Backstroke semifinals, he qualified 4th with a best time of 52.86, but failed to make the team the following day. On the Final day of the trials, he swam a 22.15 in the 50 Freestyle placing 7th, failing to qualify for the Olympic Team.

In August 2022, at the 2022 Australian Short Course Swimming Championships held in Sydney, Australia, Ress won the gold medal in the 50 meter backstroke with a time of 23.16 seconds and silver medals in the 50 meter freestyle and 100 meter freestyle, finishing only behind Kyle Chalmers of Australia in both events.

== Career best times ==
=== Short course meters (25 m pool) ===
As of November 28, 2021

Event	Time	Meet	Location	Date
50 m freestyle	20.95	2020 International Swimming League	Budapest, Hungary	November 12, 2020
100 m freestyle	45.70	2021 International Swimming League	Eindhoven, Netherlands	November 28, 2021
50 m backstroke	23.08	2020 International Swimming League	Budapest, Hungary	October 16, 2020
100 m backstroke	50.38	2021 International Swimming League	Naples, Italy	September 5, 2021
