= United States Short Course Swimming Championships =

The United States Short Course National Championships or USA Swimming Winter Nationals is a national championship meet organized by USA Swimming. The competition is swum short course yards (SCY), in a pool 25-yards long. The meet's most recent incarnation began in 2007 and was held annually in November or December until 2018 when it returned to being held in March.

Prior to 1991, the annual spring U.S. national championships were swum as a 25-yard meet; however, from 1991-2007, the meet was held as a long course (50m) meet. In the mid-2000s, USA Swimming decided to revive a Nationals meet in the short-course-yards format, but decided that the meet should be in December, rather than the late-March/early April time frame that the Spring Nationals had turned into. For 2016 USA Swimming returned to the old format with two short course Nationals in one year, American Short Course Championships in March in Austin and the Winter National Championships in Atlanta in December.

== Editions ==
Year	Location	Pool	Dates	Results	Note
1989	Chapel Hill, North Carolina		March		Spring Championships
1990	Nashville, Tennessee		March 19–23		Spring Championships
2007	Atlanta, Georgia	Georgia Tech Aquatic Center	November 29 – December 1	results	
2008	Atlanta, Georgia	Georgia Tech Aquatic Center	December 4–6	results	
2009	Federal Way, Washington	Weyerhaeuser King County Aquatic Center	December 3–5	results	
2010	Columbus, Ohio	Bill and Mae McCorkle Aquatic Pavilion	December 2–4	results	
2011	Atlanta, Georgia	Georgia Tech Aquatic Center	December 1–3	results	
2012	Austin, Texas	Lee and Joe Jamail Texas Swimming Center	November 29 – December 1	results	
2013	Knoxville, Tennessee	Allan Jones Intercollegiate Aquatic Center	December 5–7	results	
2014	Greensboro, North Carolina	Greensboro Aquatic Center	December 3–6	results	
2015	Federal Way, Washington	Weyerhaeuser King County Aquatic Center	December 3–5	results	long course
2016	Atlanta, Georgia	Georgia Tech Aquatic Center	November 30 – December 3	results	
2017	Columbus, Ohio	Bill and Mae McCorkle Aquatic Pavilion	November 29 – December 2	results	
2018	Austin, Texas	Lee and Joe Jamail Texas Swimming Center	March 1–3	results	
2019	Austin, Texas	Lee and Joe Jamail Texas Swimming Center	March 7–8		
2020	Austin, Texas	Lee and Joe Jamail Texas Swimming Center	March 5–7		
2021	Austin, Texas	Lee and Joe Jamail Texas Swimming Center	March 4–6		
2022	Austin, Texas	Lee and Joe Jamail Texas Swimming Center	March 3–5		
2026	Westmont, Illinois	FMC Natatorium	October 28–31		Short course worlds trials

== Championships records ==
=== Men ===
Event	Time		Name	Club	Date	Location	Ref
50y freestyle	18.77		Nathan Adrian	California Golden Bears	November 30, 2017	Columbus, United States	
100y freestyle	41.22		Nathan Adrian	California Golden Bears	December 2, 2017	Columbus, United States	
200y freestyle	1:31.31	†	Ricky Berens	Texas Longhorns	March 7, 2013	Austin, United States	
500y freestyle	4:07.25	NR	Zane Grothe	Indiana University	November 30, 2017	Columbus, United States	
1650y freestyle	14:18.25	NR	Zane Grothe	Indiana University	December 2, 2017	Columbus, United States	
100y backstroke	44.07		Nick Thoman	SwimMAC Carolina	December 6, 2013	Knoxville, United States	
200y backstroke	1:36.81		Ryan Lochte	Daytona Beach	December 1, 2007	Atlanta, Georgia, United States	
100y breaststroke	50.80		Nicolas Fink	Georgia Bulldogs	December 1, 2017	Columbus, United States	
200y breaststroke	1:49.31		Cody Miller	Sandpipers of Nevada	December 2, 2017	Columbus, United States	
100y butterfly	43.84	NR	Tom Shields	California Golden Bears	December 2, 2016	Atlanta, United States	
200y butterfly	1:40.24		Tom Shields	California Golden Bears	December 1, 2012	Austin, United States	
200y individual medley	1:40.08		Ryan Lochte	Daytona Beach	November 29, 2007	Atlanta, Georgia, United States	
400y individual medley	3:37.51		Shaine Casas	Texas A&M	March 6, 2020	Austin, Texas, United States	
4×50y freestyle relay	1:17.06		Tim Phillips (19.94); Dax Hill (19.32); Eric Knight (19.25); Cullen Jones (18.55)	SwimMAC Carolina	December 5, 2013	Knoxville, United States	
4×100y freestyle relay	2:51.16		Tyler Messerschmidt (42.98); Ryan Murphy (42.40); Fabio Gimondi (43.35); Seth Stubblefield (42.43)	University of California	December 7, 2013	Knoxville, United States	
4×200y freestyle relay	6:12.43		Michael Phelps (1:32.43); Peter Vanderkaay (1:33.54); Davis Tarwater (1:33.83); Chris Dejong (1:32.63)	Club Wolverine	November 30, 2007	Atlanta, Georgia, United States	
4×50y medley relay	1:23.02		Nick Thoman (20.69); Eric Knight (23.83); Tim Phillips (20.02); Cullen Jones (18.48)	SwimMAC Carolina	December 6, 2013	Knoxville, United States	
4×100y medley relay	3:05.69		Mitchell Friedemann (46.45); Kevin Cordes (51.15); Giles Smith (45.33); Nimrod Shapira Bar-Or (42.76)	Arizona Wildcats	November 29, 2012	Austin, United States	

Legend: # – Record awaiting ratification by USA Swimming; NR – United States record; e – equalled existing record;
Records not set in finals: h – heat; sf – semifinal; r – relay 1st leg; rh – relay heat 1st leg; b – B final; † – en route to final mark; so – swim-off; tt – time trial

=== Women ===
Event	Time		Name	Club	Date	Location	Ref
50y freestyle	21.12	NR	Abbey Weitzeil	Canyon	March 5, 2016	Austin, United States	
100y freestyle	46.47	h	Abbey Weitzeil	Canyon	March 6, 2016	Austin, United States	
200y freestyle	1:41.17		Mallory Comerford	Louisville Cardinals	December 1, 2017	Columbus, United States	
500y freestyle	4:29.54		Katie Ledecky	Nation's Capital	December 4, 2014	Greensboro, United States	
1650y freestyle	15:13.30	NR	Katie Ledecky	Nation's Capital	December 6, 2014	Greensboro, United States	
100y backstroke	50.64		Natalie Coughlin	Cal Aquatics	November 30, 2007	Atlanta, Georgia, United States	
200y backstroke	1:49.18		Missy Franklin	Colorado Stars	December 1, 2012	Austin, United States	
100y breaststroke	57.62		Alia Atkinson	South Florida	December 6, 2013	Knoxville, United States	
200y breaststroke	2:05.04	h	Laura Sogar	University of Texas	December 1, 2012	Austin, United States	
100y butterfly	49.87		Kelsi Worrell	Louisville Cardinals	December 1, 2017	Columbus, United States	
200y butterfly	1:51.02	h	Katinka Hosszú	USC Trojans	December 4, 2010	Columbus, Ohio, United States	
200y individual medley	1:52.63		Melanie Margalis	Florida Swimming	November 30, 2017	Columbus, United States	
400y individual medley	4:00.03		Katinka Hosszú	USC Trojans	December 3, 2010	Columbus, Ohio, United States	
4×50y freestyle relay	1:27.19		Madison Kennedy (21.88); Kelsi Hall (21.72); Katie Meili (22.04); Arianna Vanderpool-Wallace (21.55)	SwimMAC Carolina	December 5, 2013	Knoxville, United States	
4×100y freestyle relay	3:12.15		Lainey Visscher (49.10); Mallory Comerford (46.50); Arina Openysheva (48.23); Casey Fanz (48.32)	Louisville Cardinals	December 2, 2017	Columbus, United States	
4×200y freestyle relay	6:59.11		Missy Franklin (1:42.93); Caroline Piehl (1:45.33); Camille Cheng (1:46.30); Elizabeth Pelton (1:44.55)	California Golden Bears	December 6, 2013	Knoxville, United States	
4×50y medley relay	1:36.46		Lauren Smart (24.57); Ellyn Baumgardner (26.79); Megan Lafferty (23.67); Margo Geer (21.43)	Arizona Wildcats	November 30, 2012	Austin, United States	
4×100y medley relay	3:29.91		Elizabeth Pelton (51.27); Marina Garcia Urzainqui (59.58); Rachel Bootsma (51.55); Missy Franklin (47.51)	California Golden Bears	December 5, 2013	Knoxville, United States	

Legend: # – Record awaiting ratification by USA Swimming; NR – United States record; e – equalled existing record;
Records not set in finals: h – heat; sf – semifinal; r – relay 1st leg; rh – relay heat 1st leg; b – B final; † – en route to final mark; so – swim-off; tt – time trial
