= 2014 USA Swimming Championships =

American swimming tournament

The 2014 Phillips 66 National Swimming Championships were held from August 6 to 10, 2014, at the William Woollett Jr. Aquatics Center in Irvine, California.

== Men's events ==
Event	Gold		Silver		Bronze	
50 m freestyle	Anthony Ervin	21.55	Nathan Adrian	21.69	Cullen Jones	21.83
100 m freestyle	Nathan Adrian	48.31	Ryan Lochte	48.96	Jimmy Feigen	48.98
200 m freestyle	Matt McLean	1:46.93	Conor Dwyer	1:47.35	Reed Malone	1:47.41
400 m freestyle	Michael McBroom	3:47.19	Matt McLean	3:47.30	Connor Jaeger	3:49.42
800 m freestyle	Michael McBroom	7:49.66	Matt McLean	7:55.78	Michael Klueh	7:58.13
1500 m freestyle	Connor Jaeger	14:51.06	Michael McBroom	14:56.17	Jordan Wilimovsky	14:56.34
50 m backstroke	David Plummer	24.82	Nick Thoman	24.91	Shane Ryan	24.97
100 m backstroke	Matt Grevers	52.75	Ryan Murphy	53.21	Nick Thoman	53.46
200 m backstroke	Tyler Clary	1:54.73	Ryan Murphy	1:55.99	Ryan Lochte	1:56.47
50 m breaststroke	Brendan McHugh	27.24	Kevin Cordes	27.33	Zach Hayden	27.69
100 m breaststroke	Cody Miller	59.91	Nic Fink	1:00.38	Kevin Cordes	1:00.63
200 m breaststroke	Kevin Cordes	2:09.48	Nic Fink	2:09.62	Josh Prenot	2:10.43
50 m butterfly	Matt Grevers	23.50	Tim Phillips	23.58	Connor Black	23.64
100 m butterfly	Tom Shields	51.29	Michael Phelps	51.30	Tim Phillips	51.54
200 m butterfly	Tom Shields	1:55.09	Tyler Clary	1:56.00	Chase Kalisz	1:56.50
200 m IM	Ryan Lochte	1:56.50	Michael Phelps	1:56.55	Tyler Clary	1:57.94
400 m IM	Tyler Clary	4:09.51	Chase Kalisz	4:11.52	Josh Prenot	4:14.85

== Women's events ==
Event	Gold		Silver		Bronze	
50 m freestyle	Simone Manuel	24.56	Ivy Martin	24.72	Madeline Locus	24.81
100 m freestyle	Missy Franklin	53.43	Simone Manuel	53.66	Shannon Vreeland	54.14
200 m freestyle	Katie Ledecky	1:55.16	Missy Franklin	1:56.40	Leah Smith	1:57.57
400 m freestyle	Katie Ledecky	3:58.86 WR	Cierra Runge	4:04.67	Leah Smith	4:06.28
800 m freestyle	Katie Ledecky	8:18.47	Cierra Runge	8:24.69	Becca Mann	8:26.64
1500 m freestyle	Katy Campbell	16:17.59	Danielle Valley	16:19.83	Lindsay Vrooman	16:22.83
50 m backstroke	Rachel Bootsma	28.35	Cheyenne Coffman	28.42	Olivia Smoliga	28.49
100 m backstroke	Missy Franklin	59.38	Rachel Bootsma	1:00.71	Elizabeth Pelton	1:00.76
200 m backstroke	Missy Franklin	2:08.38	Kathleen Baker	2:10.42	Lisa Bratton	2:11.57
50 m breaststroke	Jessica Hardy	30.12	Breeja Larson	30.64	Katie Meili Micah Lawrence	31.00
100 m breaststroke	Micah Lawrence Jessica Hardy	1:06.51	Not awarded		Breeja Larson	1:06.73
200 m breaststroke	Micah Lawrence	2:23.05	Breeja Larson	2:24.16	Melanie Margalis	2:25.27
50 m butterfly	Kendyl Stewart	25.99	Claire Donahue	26.11	Kelsi Worrell	26.35
100 m butterfly	Kendyl Stewart	57.98	Claire Donahue	58.03	Felicia Lee	58.14
200 m butterfly	Cammile Adams	2:07.12	Katie McLaughlin	2:08.74	Hali Flickinger	2:08.77
200 m IM	Melanie Margalis	2:10.20	Maya DiRado	2:10.57	Caitlin Leverenz	2:11.05
400 m IM	Elizabeth Beisel	4:32.98	Maya DiRado	4:35.75	Melanie Margalis	4:37.84
