= Seth Stubblefield =

American swimmer (born 1993)

Personal information
- Nickname: "Stubbs"
- National team: United States
- Born: July 21, 1993 (age 33) San Angelo, Texas
- Height: 6 ft 4 in (193 cm)
- Weight: 185 lb (84 kg)

Sport
- Sport: Swimming
- Strokes: Butterfly, freestyle
- Club: California Aquatics
- College team: California Golden Bears
- Coach: Dave Durden
Medal record
Men's swimming
Representing the United States
Event	1st	2nd	3rd
Summer Universiade	1	0	0
Total	1	0	0
Summer Universiade
Gold medal – first place	2015 Gwangju	4×100 m freestyle
Representing the California Golden Bears
Event	1st	2nd	3rd
NCAA Championships	3	5	1
Total	3	5	1
By race
Event	1st	2nd	3rd
4×50 y freestyle	2	1	0
4×100 y freestyle	0	2	1
4×50 y medley	0	1	0
4×100 y medley	1	1	0
Total	3	5	1
NCAA Championships
Gold medal – first place	2014 Austin	4×50 y freestyle
Gold medal – first place	2014 Austin	4×100 y medley
Gold medal – first place	2012 Federal Way	4×50 y freestyle
Silver medal – second place	2015 Iowa City	4×50 y freestyle
Silver medal – second place	2015 Iowa City	4×100 y medley
Silver medal – second place	2014 Austin	4×100 y freestyle
Silver medal – second place	2013 Indianapolis	4×50 y medley
Silver medal – second place	2012 Federal Way	4×100 y freestyle
Bronze medal – third place	2015 Iowa City	4×100 y freestyle

Seth Stubblefield (born July 21, 1993) is an American retired competitive swimmer who specialized in sprint freestyle and butterfly. He is a gold medalist in the 4×100-meter freestyle relay from the 2015 World University Games in Gwangju.

== Early life ==
Stubblefield was the 2010 Junior National champion in both the 100 and 200-meter butterfly, which qualified him for the 2010 Junior Pan Pacific Championships in Maui, Hawaii. At Junior Pan Pacs, Stubblefield earned a silver medal in the 200-meter butterfly and a gold medal in the 4×100-meter freestyle relay.

Swimming as a sophomore for Plano Senior High School at the 2009 5A Texas State Championships, Stubblefield won the 4×50 and the 4×100 y freestyle relays. As a junior at the 2010 State Championships, he won the 4×100 freestyle relay and was runner-up in the 50 y freestyle and the 100 y butterfly. In the 4×50 y medley relay, Stubblefield teamed up with high school and club teammate Will Licon to earn a bronze medal. In his senior year, he elected to forego his last year of high school eligibility. He still currently holds the Plano Senior High School records in the 200-yard freestyle relay, 200-yard medley relay, and the 400-yard freestyle relay.

== Collegiate career ==
Stubblefield competed for the California Golden Bears from 2011 to 2015 where he was a 3-time NCAA champion, 5-time NCAA runner-up, 2-time NCAA team champion (2012 & 2014), 16-time All-American, and a 5-time honorable mention All-American. He also formerly held the American record in the 4×100 medley relay from the 2015 NCAA Championships.

== International career ==
At the 2014 Phillips 66 Summer National Championships, Stubblefield swam the 50 and 100-meter freestyles as well as the 100-meter butterfly. Stubblefield's times in the 50 and 100 freestyles qualified himself for the 2015 World University Games in Gwangju, where he won a gold medal in the 4 × 100 m freestyle relay.

At the 2016 U.S. Olympic Trials, Stubblefield entered the 100-meter butterfly final as the top-seeded swimmer, ahead of the likes of Michael Phelps and Tom Shields. In a tightly contested race, Stubblefield touched third behind Phelps and Shields, missing out on an Olympic berth by 4-hundredths of a second.

== Personal life ==
Seth is married to former University of Georgia All-American swimmer Lauren (Harrington) Stubblefield, and they have a son together named Judah. Seth is the son of Scott and Patti Stubblefield and has a younger sister, Alyssa.

== Personal bests ==
As of February 22, 2021

Short course yards
Event	Time	Meet	Date	Note(s)
50 y freestyle	18.97	2014 NCAA Championships	March 27, 2014	
100 y butterfly	45.84	2015 Pac-12 Conference Championships	March 6, 2015	
100 y freestyle	42.31	2014 NCAA Championships	March 29, 2014	

Long course
Event	Time	Meet	Date	Note(s)
50 m butterfly	24.36	2017 Phillips 66 Summer National Championships	June 28, 2017	
50 m freestyle	22.15	2014 Phillips 66 Summer National Championships	August 10, 2014	
100 m butterfly	51.24	2016 U.S. Olympic Trials	July 1, 2016	
100 m freestyle	49.09	2014 Phillips 66 Summer National Championships	August 6, 2014	

== See also ==
- NCAA Division I Men's Swimming and Diving Championships
- California Golden Bears
- List of University of California, Berkeley alumni in sports
