= 2013 NCAA Division I Men's Swimming and Diving Championships =

American college aquatic sports competition

2013 NCAA Division I Swimming and Diving Championships
- Host city: Indianapolis, Indiana
- Date: March 28–30, 2013
- Venue: Indiana University Natatorium

The 2013 NCAA Division I Men's Swimming and Diving Championships were contested from March 28–30, 2013 at the Indiana University Natatorium in Indianapolis, Indiana at the 90th annual NCAA-sanctioned swim meet to determine the team and individual national champions of Division I men's collegiate swimming and diving in the United States.

Michigan topped the team standings, finishing 73.5 points ahead of two-time defending champions California. It was the Wolverines' then-record twelfth men's team title and first since 1995.

== Team standings ==
- Note: Top 10 only
- ^{(DC)} = Defending champions
- Full results

Rank	Team	Points
1st place, gold medalist(s)	Michigan	480
2nd place, silver medalist(s)	California ^{(DC)}	406 1/2
3rd place, bronze medalist(s)	Arizona	313 1/2
4	USC	289
5	Texas	288
6	Florida	285 1/2
7	Stanford	282
8	Auburn	226 1/2
9	Indiana	201
10	Georgia	163

== Swimming results ==
Event	Gold		Silver		Bronze	
50 freestyle	Vladimir Morozov; USC	18.63	Marcelo Chierighini; Auburn	18.99	Derek Toomey; Minnesota	19.18
100 freestyle	Vladimir Morozov; USC	40.76; US	Marcelo Chierighini; Auburn	41.51	Joao de Lucca; Louisville	42.27
200 freestyle	Joao de Lucca; Louisville	1:31.51	Dimitri Colupaev; USC	1:32.74	Tom Kremer; Stanford	1:33.07
500 freestyle	Connor Jaeger; Michigan	4:10.84	Michael McBroom; Texas	4:11.39	Cristian Quintero; USC	4:13.52
1650 freestyle	Connor Jaeger; Michigan	14:27.18	Michael McBroom; Texas	14:32.75	Martias Koski; Georgia	14:42.09
100 backstroke	David Nolan; Stanford	44.99	Tom Shields; California	45.21	Eric Ress; Indiana	45.31
200 backstroke	Andrew Teduits; Wisconsin	1:38.27	David Nolan; Stanford	1:39.31	Jacob Pebley; California	1:39.71
100 breaststroke	Kevin Cordes; Arizona	50.74; US, AR	Kevin Steel; Arizona	51.69	Richard Funk; Michigan	51.84
200 breaststroke	Kevin Cordes; Arizona	1:48.68; US, AR	Carl Mickelson; Arizona	1:51.90	Trevor Hoyt; California	1:52.19
100 butterfly	Tom Shields; California	44.59	Marcin Cieslak; Florida	45.35	Sean Fletcher; Michigan	45.54
200 butterfly	Tom Shields; California	1:39.65 =US, =AR	Marcin Cieslak; Florida	1:40.62	Dylan Bosch; Michigan	1:41.37
200 IM	David Nolan; Stanford	1:41.21	Marcin Cieslak; Florida	1:41.45	Cody Miller; Indiana	1:41.99
400 IM	Chase Kalisz; Georgia	3:38.05	Michael Weiss; Wisconsin	3:39.61	Dan Wallace; Florida	3:39.87
200 freestyle relay	Auburn; Marcelo Chierighini (18.99); James Disney-May (18.87); TJ Leon (19.06); Kyle Owens (18.56)	1:15.48	USC; Jack Wagner (19.72); Maclin Davis (19.36); Vladimir Morozov (17.86); Dimitri Colupaev (19.28)	1:16.22	Michigan; Bruno Ortiz (19.45); Zack Turk (18.95); Sean Fletcher (19.30); Miguel Ortiz (18.79)	1:16.49
400 freestyle relay	USC; Cristian Quintero (42.81); Dimitri Colupaev (42.23); Jack Wagner (43.01); Vladimir Morozov (40.28)	2:48.33	Michigan; Miguel Ortiz (42.80); Zack Turk (42.16); Sean Fletcher (42.87); Bruno Ortiz (42.35)	2:50.18	Auburn; Marcelo Chierighini (42.06); James Disney-May (42.23); Arthur Mendes (43.56); Kyls Owens (42.69)	2:50.54
800 freestyle relay	Florida; Pawel Werner (1:33.62); Sebastien Rousseau (1:33.13); Marcin Cieslak (1:32.86); Dan Wallace (1:33.66)	6:13.27	Michigan; Michael Wynalda (1:34.35); Connor Jaeger (1:33.38); Anders Nielsen (1:33.38); Hassaan Abdel Khalik (1:34.43)	6:15.54	USC; Dimitri Colupaev (1:33.23); James Lendrum (1:35.53); Chad Bobrosky (1:34.78); Cristian Quintero (1:32.40)	6:15.94
200 medley relay	Michigan; Miguel Ortiz (20.83); Bruno Ortiz (23.07); Sean Fletcher (19.92); Zack Turk (18.45)	1:22.27; US	California; Tony Cox (21.24); Trevor Hoyt (23.58); Tom Shields (19.71); Seth Stubblefield (18.64)	1:23.17; AR	Arizona; Mitchell Friedemann (21.05); Kevin Cordes (23.08); Giles Smith (20.07); Nimrod Shapira Bar-Or (19.03)	1:23.23
400 medley relay	Arizona; Mitchell Friedemann (45.51); Kevin Cordes (49.56); Giles Smith (44.86); Nimrod Shapira Bar-Or (42.16)	3:02.09	California; Tony Cox (46.50); Trevor Hoyt (52.20); Tom Shields (43.48); Fabio Gimondi (42.28)	3:04.46	Michigan; Miguel Ortiz (45.85); Richard Funk (51.51); Sean Fletcher (45.15); Bruno Ortiz (42.12)	3:04.73

Legend: US – U.S. Open record; AR – American record;

== Diving results ==
Event	Gold		Silver		Bronze	
1 m diving	Kristian Ipsen; Stanford	473.75	Nick McCrory; Duke	436.60	David Bonuchi; Missouri	407.45
3 m diving	Kristian Ipsen; Stanford	450.60	Nick McCrory; Duke	440.40	Darian Schmidt; Indiana	425.50
Platform diving	Nick McCrory; Duke	495.90	Kristian Ipsen; Stanford	452.90	Conor Murphy; Indiana	422.15

== See also ==
- List of college swimming and diving teams
