= 2014 NCAA Division I Men's Swimming and Diving Championships =

American college aquatic sports competition

2014 NCAA Division I Swimming and Diving Championships
- Host city: Austin, Texas
- Date: March 2014
- Venue(s): Lee and Joe Jamail Texas Swimming Center; University of Texas

The 2014 NCAA Division I Men's Swimming and Diving Championships were contested in March 2014 at the Lee and Joe Jamail Texas Swimming Center at the University of Texas in Austin, Texas at the 80th annual NCAA-sanctioned swim meet to determine the team and individual national champions of Division I men's collegiate swimming and diving in the United States.

California topped the team standings, the Golden Bears' fifth men's title and third in four years.

== Team standings ==
- Note: Top 10 only
- (H) = Hosts
- ^{(DC)} = Defending champions
- Full results

Rank	Team	Points
1st place, gold medalist(s)	California	468.5
2nd place, silver medalist(s)	Texas (H)	417.5
3rd place, bronze medalist(s)	Florida	387
4	Michigan ^{(DC)}	310
5	Georgia	259
6	Auburn	230
7	Arizona	198.5
8	USC	182
9	Stanford	155
10	Indiana	141

== Swimming results ==
Event	Gold		Silver		Bronze	
50 freestyle	Kristian Golomeev; Alabama Brad Tandy; Arizona	18.95	None awarded		Brad Deborde; Florida	18.98
100 freestyle	João de Lucca; Louisville	41.70	Marcelo Chierighini; Auburn	41.97	Cristian Quintero; USC	42.14
200 freestyle	João de Lucca; Louisville	1:31.96	Cristian Quintero; USC	1:32.28	Michael Wynalda; Michigan	1:32.58
500 freestyle	Cristian Quintero; USC	4:10.02	Dan Wallace; Florida	4:11.62	Connor Jaeger; Michigan	4:12.67
1650 freestyle	Connor Jaeger; Michigan	14:29.27	Jeremy Bagshaw; California	14:39.00	Arthur Frayler; Florida	14:43.08
100 backstroke	Ryan Murphy; California	44.63	Shane Ryan; Penn State	44.78	Kip Darmody; Texas	45.03
200 backstroke	Ryan Murphy; California	1:37.35	Eric Ress; Indiana	1:38.69	David Nolan; Stanford	1:39.17
100 breaststroke	Kevin Cordes; Arizona	50.04; US, AR	Nic Fink; Georgia	51.48	Richard Funk; Michigan	51.96
200 breaststroke	Kevin Cordes; Arizona	1:48.66; US, AR	Cody Miller; Indiana	1:51.82	Nic Fink; Georgia	1:51.92
100 butterfly	Marcin Cieślak; Florida	44.87	Pavel Sankovich; Florida State	45.00	Tim Phillips; Ohio State	45.10
200 butterfly	Dylan Bosch; Michigan	1:39.33; US, AR	Marcin Cieślak; Florida	1:40.19	Marcin Tarczyński; Florida	1:42.11
200 IM	Marcin Cieślak; Florida	1:40.58	Chase Kalisz; Georgia	1:41.19	David Nolan; Stanford	1:41.38
400 IM	Chase Kalisz; Georgia	3:34.50; US, AR	Dan Wallace; Florida	3:38.17	Josh Prenot; California	3:38.58
200 freestyle relay	California; Tyler Messerschmidt (19.23); Ryan Murphy (18.75); Tony Cox (18.81); Seth Stubblefield (18.48)	1:15.27	Texas; Matt Ellis (19.19); John Murray (18.36); Tripp Cooper (19.21); Kip Darmody (18.77)	1:15.53	Auburn; Marcelo Chierighini (19.36); James Disney-May (18.93); Kyle Darmody (18.67); Tj Leon (18.96)	1:15.92
400 freestyle relay	Aubrun; Marcelo Chierighini (42.06); James Disney-May (42.02); Arthur Mendes (42.77); Kyle Darmody (41.48)	2:48.33	California; Tyler Messerschmidt (42.64); Ryan Murphy (41.67); Fabio Gimondi (43.20); Seth Stubblefield (41.97)	2:49.38	NC State; Simonas Bilis (42.19); David Williams (42.35); Jonathan Boffa (41.65); Andreas Schiellerup (43.31)	2:49.50
800 freestyle relay	USC; Cristian Quintero (1:32.84); Reed Malone (1:34.32); Dylan Carter (1:33.25); Dimitri Colupaev (1:32.68)	6:13.09	Florida; Mitch D'Arrigo (1:34.05); Sebastian Rousseau (1:33.90); Marcin Cieślak (1:33.66); Dan Wallace (1:33.13)	6:14.74	Stanford; Drew Cosgarea (1:34.22); Thomas Stephens (1:34.76); David Nolan (1:32.89); Tom Kremer (1:33.80)	6:15.67
200 medley relay	California; Ryan Murphy (20.90); Chuck Katis (23.29); Tony Cox (19.99); Tyler Messerschmidt (18.65)	1:22.83	Texas; Kip Darmody (20.88); John Murray (23.45); Jack Conger (20.01); Caleb Weir (18.96)	1:23.30	Auburn; Joe Patching (24.47); Michael Duderstadt (23.65); Marcelo Chierighini (20.17); Kyle Darmody (18.37)	1:23.87
400 medley relay	California; Ryan Murphy (44.91); Chuck Katis (50.46); Marcin Tarczyński (45.43); Seth Stubblefield (41.86)	3:02.66	Florida; Corey Main (46.21); Eduardo Solaeche-Gomez (52.10); Marcin Cieślak (44.65); Brad Deborde (41.81)	3:04.77	Texas; Kip Darmody (45.27); Imri Ganiel (52.79); Tripp Cooper (44.47); Caleb Weir (42.26)	3:04.79

Legend: US – U.S. Open record; AR – American record;

== Diving results ==
Event	Gold		Silver		Bronze	
1 m diving	Michael Hixon; Texas	443.50	Kristian Ipsen; Stanford	436.55	Nick McCrory; Duke	412.15
3 m diving	Michael Hixon; Texas	457.20	Riley McCormick; ASU	412.40	Mauricio Robles-Rodriguez; Tennessee	406.65
Platform diving	Nick McCrory; Duke	454.85	Rafael Quintero; Arizona	452.40	Amund Gismervik; Hawaii	446.10

== See also ==
- List of college swimming and diving teams
