= 2015 NCAA Division I Men's Swimming and Diving Championships =

American college aquatic sports competition

2015 NCAA Division I Swimming and Diving Championships
- Host city: Iowa City, Iowa
- Date: March 26–28, 2015
- Venue(s): Iowa Natatorium; University of Iowa
- Teams: 50
- Events: 17

The 2015 NCAA Division I Men's Swimming and Diving Championships were contested March 26–28, 2015 at the Iowa Natatorium at the University of Iowa in Iowa City, Iowa at the 92nd annual NCAA-sanctioned swim meet to determine the team and individual national champions of Division I men's collegiate swimming and diving in the United States.

Texas topped the team standings, the Longhorns' eleventh men's team title.

== Team standings ==
- Note: Top 10 only
- (H) = Hosts
- ^{(DC)} = Defending champions
- Full results

Rank	Team	Points
1st place, gold medalist(s)	Texas	528
2nd place, silver medalist(s)	California ^{(DC)}	399
3rd place, bronze medalist(s)	Michigan	312
4	USC	278
5	Florida	248
6	Stanford	209
7	Georgia	208
8	NC State	199
9	Auburn	182
10	Alabama	176

== Swimming results ==
Event	Gold		Silver		Bronze	
50 freestyle	Caeleb Dressel; Florida	18.67	Kristian Golomeev; Alabama	18.74	Simonas Bilis; NC State Brad Tandy; Arizona	18.91
100 freestyle	Kristian Golomeev; Alabama	41.56	Simonas Bilis; NC State	41.78	Cristian Quintero; USC	42.18
200 freestyle	Cristian Quintero; USC	1:32.03	Anders Nielson; Michigan	1:32.73	Clay Youngquist; Texas	1:33.10
500 freestyle	Clark Smith; Texas	4:09.72	Dan Wallace; Florida	4:10.48	Reed Malone; USC	4:11.94
1650 freestyle	Matias Koski; Georgia	14:32.38	PJ Ransford; Michigan	14:34.36	Jordan Wilimovsky; Northwestern	14:36.64
100 backstroke	Ryan Murphy; California	44.21	David Nolan; Stanford	44.78	Shane Ryan; Penn State	45.24
200 backstroke	Ryan Murphy; California	1:36.77; US, AR	Sean Lehane; Tennessee	1:39.20	David Nolan; Stanford	1:39.59
100 breaststroke	Kevin Cordes; Arizona	50.25	Nic Fink; Georgia	51.08	Chuck Katis; California	51.15
200 breaststroke	Will Licon; Texas	1:49.48	Kevin Cordes; Arizona	1:49.53	Chuck Katis; California	1:50.54
100 butterfly	Joseph Schooling; Texas	44.51	Jack Conger; Texas	44.55	Tripp Cooper; Texas	45.06
200 butterfly	Joseph Schooling; Texas	1:39.62	Jack Conger; Texas	1:39.74	Dylan Bosch; Michigan	1:40.12
200 IM	David Nolan; Stanford	1:39.38; US, AR	Will Licon; Texas	1:40.09	Josh Prenot; California	1:42.34
400 IM	Will Licon; Texas	3:36.37	Chase Kalisz; Georgia	3:39.51	Gunnar Bentz; Georgia	3:39.87
200 freestyle relay	Texas; Matt Ellis (19.33); John Murray (18.85); Jack Conger (18.75); Kip Darmody (18.93)	1:15.86	California; Tyler Messerschmidt (19.24); Seth Stubblefield (18.82); Fabio Gimondi (19.28); Ryan Murphy (18.68)	1:16.02	Auburn; Arthur Mendes (19.58); Jacob Molacek (18.78); Michael Duderstadt (18.96); Kyle Darmody (18.72)	1:16.04
400 freestyle relay	USC; Cristian Quintero (42.39); Santo Condorelli (41.72); Ralf Tribuntsov (41.64); Dylan Carter (41.31)	2:47.06	NC State; Ryan Held (42.45); Simonas Bilis (41.11); Soeren Dahl (42.03); David Williams (41.55)	2:47.14	California; Tyler Messerschmidt (42.83); Seth Stubblefield (41.94); Fabio Gimondi (42.24); Ryan Murphy (41.14)	2:48.15
800 freestyle relay	USC; Cristian Quintero (1:32.89); Dylan Carter (1:32.78); Michael Domagala (1:34.38); Reed Malone (1:31.59)	6:11.64	NC State; Ryan Held (1:33.62); David Williams (1:32.51); Soeren Dahl (1:33.35); Simonas Bilis (1:33.00)	6:12.48	Stanford; Andrew Cosgarea (1:35.10); Thomas Stephens (1:34.91); David Nolan (1:31.81); Tom Kremer (1:33.01)	6:14.83
200 medley relay	California; Ryan Murphy (20.64); Chuck Katis (22.79); Justin Lynch (20.63); Tyler Messerschmidt (18.68)	1:22.74	Alabama; Connor Oslin (20.78); Anton Sveinn McKee (23.86); Brett Walsh (20.47); Kristian Golomeev (18.24)	1:23.35	Texas; Kip Darmody (21.29); John Murray (23.55); Joseph Schooling (19.91); Brett Ringgold (18.71)	1:23.46
400 medley relay	Texas; Kip Darmody (45.39); Will Licon (50.93); Joseph Schooling (43.95); Jack Conger (40.96)	3:01.23; US	California; Ryan Murphy (44.17); Chuck Katis (50.12); Justin Lynch (45.47); Seth Stubblefield (41.84)	3:01.60; AR	Alabama; Connor Oslin (45.08); Anton Sveinn McKee (52.37); Brett Walsh (46.07); Kristian Golomeev (40.94)	3:04.46

Legend: US – U.S. Open record; AR – American record;

== Diving results ==
Event	Gold		Silver		Bronze	
1 m diving	Steele Johnson; Purdue	468.15	Sam Dorman; Miami	457.30	Kristian Ipsen; Stanford	449.45
3 m diving	Sam Dorman; Miami	529.10; MR	Michael Hixon; Indiana	492.40	Kristian Ipsen; Stanford	482.75
Platform diving	Steele Johnson; Purdue	532.70	James Connor; Indiana	514.80	Matt Barnard; Minnesota	473.80

Legend: MR – Meet record;

== See also ==
- List of college swimming and diving teams
