= 2016 United States Olympic Trials =

2016 United States Olympic Trials may refer to:

- 2016 United States Olympic Trials (swimming)
- 2016 United States Olympic Trials (track and field)
