= 2012 NCAA Division I Men's Swimming and Diving Championships =

American college aquatic sports competition

2012 NCAA Division I Swimming and Diving Championships
- Host city: (Washington (state)) Federal Way, Washington
- Date: March 22–24, 2012
- Venue: Weyerhaeuser Aquatic Center

The 2012 NCAA Division I Men's Swimming and Diving Championships were contested from March 22–24, 2012 at the Weyerhaeuser Aquatic Center in Federal Way, Washington at the 89th annual NCAA-sanctioned swim meet to determine the team and individual national champions of Division I men's collegiate swimming and diving in the United States.

California again topped the team standings, finishing 44.5 points ahead of Texas. It was the Golden Bears' fourth team national title.

== Team standings ==
- Note: Top 10 only
- ^{(DC)} = Defending champions
- Full results

| Rank | Team | Points |
|---|---|---|
| 1st place, gold medalist(s) | California ^{(DC)} | 535 1/2 |
| 2nd place, silver medalist(s) | Texas | 491 |
| 3rd place, bronze medalist(s) | Stanford | 426 1/2 |
| 4 | Arizona | 396 |
| 5 | Michigan | 271 |
| 6 | Auburn | 254 1/2 |
| 7 | USC | 192 |
| 8 | Florida | 157 |
| 9 | Louisville | 156 |
| 10 | Indiana | 166 |

== Swimming results ==
| Event | Gold | | Silver | | Bronze | |
|---|---|---|---|---|---|---|
| 50 freestyle | Jimmy Feigen; Texas | 19.01 | Vladimir Morozov; USC | 19.08 | Jason Schnur; Ohio State | 19.46 |
| 100 freestyle | Jimmy Feigen; Texas | 41.95 | Marcelo Chierighini; Auburn | 42.34 | Vladimir Morozov; USC | 42.44 |
| 200 freestyle | Daxon Hill; Texas | 1:32.51 | Dimitri Colupaev; USC | 1:33.49 | Joao de Lucca; Louisville | 1:34.00 |
| 500 freestyle | Martin Grodzki; Georgia | 4:12.95 | Cristian Quintero; USC | 4:13.07 | Chad La Tourette; Stanford | 4:13.92 |
| 1650 freestyle | Martin Grodzki; Georgia | 14:24.08; US | Chad La Tourette; Stanford | 14:24.35; AR | Connor Jaeger; Michigan | 14:25.14 |
| 100 backstroke | Tom Shields; California | 44.86 | David Nolan; Stanford | 45.53 | Cole Cragin; Texas | 45.89 |
| 200 backstroke | Cory Chitwood; Arizona | 1:39.66 | David Nolan; Stanford | 1:39.74 | Matthew Thompson; California | 1:41.81 |
| 100 breaststroke | Kevin Cordes; Arizona | 51.71 | Carlos Almeida; Louisville | 51.78 | Martin Liivamagi; California | 51.93 |
| 200 breaststroke | Carlos Almeida; Louisville | 1:51.88 | Trevor Hoyt; California | 1:51.90 | Kevin Cordes; Arizona | 1:51.97 |
| 100 butterfly | Tom Shields; California | 44.76 | Giles Smith; Arizona | 45.77 | Marcin Cieslak; Florida | 45.86 |
| 200 butterfly | Will Hamilton; California | 1:40.94 | Tom Shields; California | 1:41.07 | Marcin Cieslak; Florida | 1:41.36 |
| 200 IM | Marcin Tarczynski; California | 1:41.97 | Marcin Cieslak; Florida | 1:42.26 | David Nolan; Stanford | 1:42.85 |
| 400 IM | Austen Thompson; Arizona | 3:39.15 | Kyle Whitaker; Michigan | 3:41.37 | Michael Weiss; Wisconsin | 3:43.12 |
| 200 freestyle relay | California; Tyler Messerschmidt (19.37); Shayne Fleming (18.94); Fabio Gimondi (19.27); Seth Stubblefield (19.00) | 1:16.58 | Auburn; Drew Modrov (19.44); Karl Krug (18.95); TJ Leon (19.26); Marcelo Chierighini (19.02) | 1:16.67 | Arizona; Adam Small (19.38); Kelley Wyman (18.83); Mitchell Friedemann (19.02); Thomas Gutman (19.48) | 1:16.71 |
| 400 freestyle relay | Texas; Daxon Hill (42.70); Clay Youngquist (42.82); Austin Surhoff (42.99); Jimmy Feigen (41.32) | 2:49.83 | California; Tyler Messerschmidt (43.19); Shayne Fleming (42.71); Fabio Gimondi (42.65); Tom Shields (41.79) Auburn; Drew Modrov (43.11); Karl Krug (43.02); James Disney-May (42.21); Marcelo Chierighini (42.00) | 2:50.34 | None awarded | |
| 800 freestyle relay | Texas; Daxon Hill (1:33.80); Clay Youngquist (1:33.41); Kip Darmody (1:35.08); Neil Caskey (1:33.26) | 6:15.55 | California; Tom Shields (1:33.72); Samuel Metz (1:33.81); Will Hamilton (1:33.19); Benjamin Hinshaw (1:34.98) | 6:15.70 | Stanford; Aaron Wayne (1:33.24); David Mosko (1:35.63); Bobby Bollier (1:35.10); Robert Andrews (1:35.22) | 6:19.19 |
| 200 medley relay | Arizona; Mitchell Friedemann (21.28); Kevin Cordes (23.25); Giles Smith (20.22); Adam Small (18.78) | 1:23.53; AR | California; Mathias Gydesen (21.67); Martin Liivamagi (23.61); Tom Shields (19.80); Tyler Messerschmidt (18.83) | 1:23.91 | Auburn; Kyle Owens (21.24); Stuart Ferguson (24.02); Marcelo Chierighini (20.36); Karl Krug (19.08) | 1:24.70 |
| 400 medley relay | California; Mathias Gydesen (46.07); Nolan Koon (51.93); Tom Shields (43.56); Tyler Messerschmidt (41.68) | 3:03.24 | Arizona; Mitchell Friedemann (45.93); Kevin Cordes (50.52); Giles Smith (45.45); Kelley Wyman (42.83) | 3:04.83 | Texas; Cole Cragin (45.92); Eric Friedland (52.15); Neil Caskey (45.97); Jimmy Feigen (41.64) | 3:05.68 |

Legend: US – U.S. Open record; AR – American record;

== Diving results ==
| Event | Gold | | Silver | | Bronze | |
|---|---|---|---|---|---|---|
| 1 m diving | Drew Livingston; Texas | 448.10 | Kristian Ipsen; Stanford | 410.15 | Cameron Bradshaw; Arizona State | 402.95 |
| 3 m diving | Kristian Ipsen; Stanford | 469.20 | Drew Livingston; Texas | 454.25 | David Bonuchi; Missouri | 434.50 |
| Platform diving | Ben Grado; Arizona | 487.25 | David Bonuchi; Missouri | 456.00 | Matt Cooper; Texas | 449.15 |

== See also ==
- List of college swimming and diving teams
