= Dan Wallace (swimmer) =

Scottish swimmer

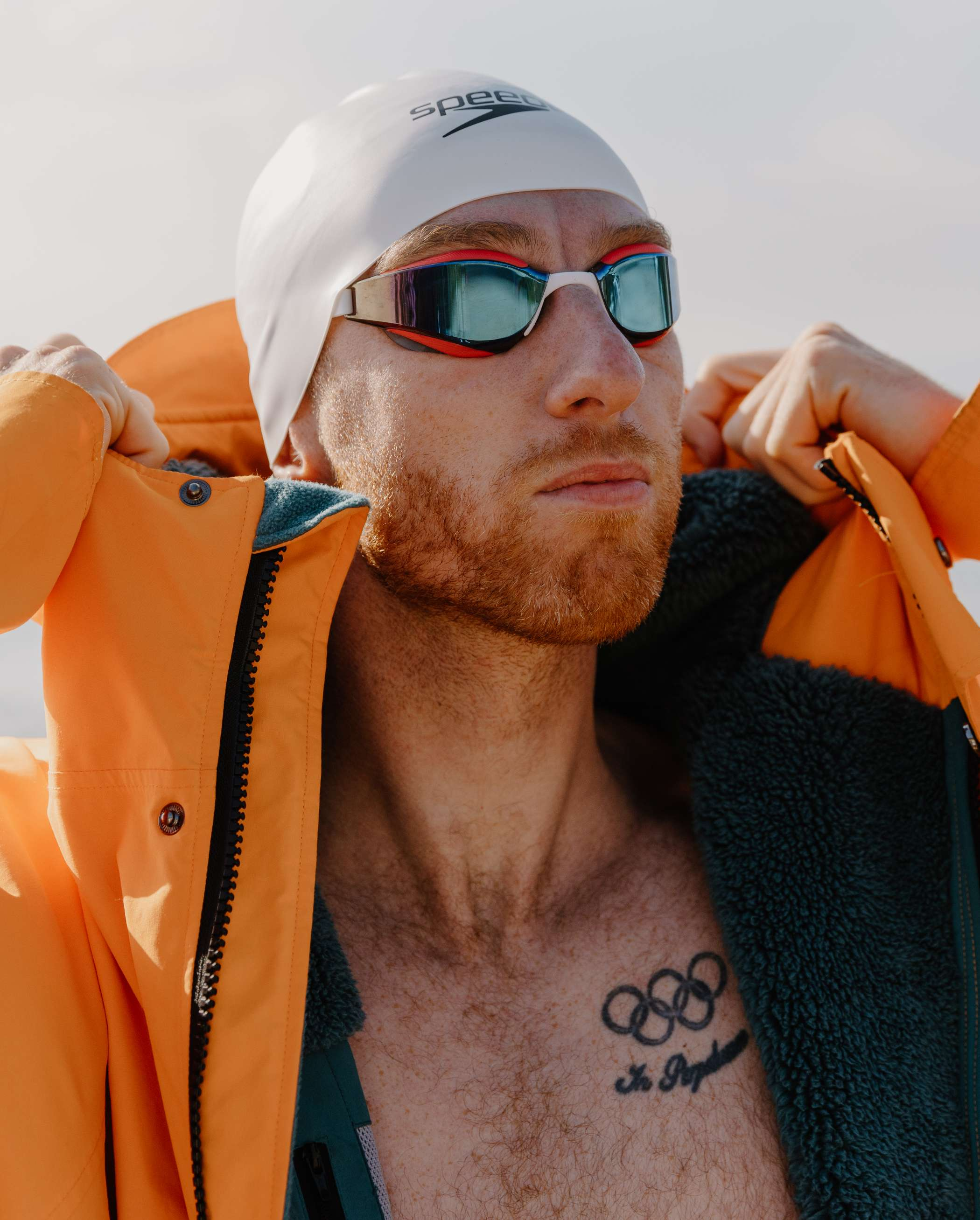
- Portrait of British Olympic swimmer Dan Wallace

Personal information
- Full name: Daniel Wallace
- National team: Great Britain; Scotland
- Born: 14 April 1993 (age 33) Edinburgh, Scotland

Sport
- Sport: Swimming
- Strokes: Freestyle, Individual medley
- Club: University of Stirling
- College team: University of Florida (U.S.)
Medal record
Men's swimming
Representing Great Britain
Olympic Games
Silver medal – second place	2016 Rio de Janeiro	4×200 m freestyle
World Championships (LC)
Gold medal – first place	2015 Kazan	4×200 m freestyle
European Junior Championships
Silver medal – second place	2011 Belgrade	200 m medley
Bronze medal – third place	2011 Belgrade	400 m medley
Representing Scotland
Commonwealth Games
Gold medal – first place	2014 Glasgow	400 m medley
Silver medal – second place	2014 Glasgow	200 m medley
Silver medal – second place	2014 Glasgow	4×200 m freestyle
Bronze medal – third place	2018 Gold Coast	4×100 m freestyle
Bronze medal – third place	2018 Gold Coast	4×200 m freestyle
Representing the Florida Gators
Event	1st	2nd	3rd
NCAA Championships	1	4	1
Total	1	4	1
By race
Event	1st	2nd	3rd
500 y freestyle	0	2	0
400 y medley	0	1	1
4×200 y freestyle	1	1	0
Total	1	4	1
NCAA Championships
Gold medal – first place	2013 Indianapolis	4×200 y freestyle
Silver medal – second place	2014 Austin	400 y medley
Silver medal – second place	2014 Austin	500 y freestyle
Silver medal – second place	2014 Austin	4×200 y freestyle
Silver medal – second place	2015 Iowa City	500 y freestyle
Bronze medal – third place	2013 Indianapolis	400 y medley

Daniel Wallace (born 14 April 1993) is a retired Scottish swimmer who has represented Great Britain in the Olympic Games and FINA world championships, and Scotland in the Commonwealth Games. The 2014 Commonwealth Games champion at 400 metre individual medley, he was part of the Great Britain 4 x 200 metre freestyle relay team that won gold at the 2015 FINA World Aquatics Championships, and silver at the same event at the 2016 Summer Olympics. In June 2023, Dan Wallace swam the channel, as part of a 5-man relay team, in aid of multiple charities, raising over £200.000 in aid of Cancer Research and funds to support Ukrainian refugees.

== Career ==
Dan competed for Scotland at the 2014 Commonwealth Games held in Glasgow, Wallace won the gold medal in the men's 400-metre individual medley with a first-place time 4:11.28. He also won a silver medal in the 200-metre individual medley and silver as a member of the second-place Scottish team in the 4x200-metre freestyle relay.

He was born in Edinburgh, and trained under head coach Laurel Bailey at Warrender Baths Club. In 2011, Wallace won a silver medal for the 200-metre individual medley and a bronze for the 400-metre individual medley at the 2011 European Junior Swimming Championships in Belgrade, Serbia.

Wallace accepted an athletic scholarship to attend the University of Florida in Gainesville, Florida, United States, where he swam for coach Gregg Troy's Florida Gators swimming and diving team in National Collegiate Athletic Association (NCAA) and Southeastern Conference (SEC) competition from 2012 to 2015. In his four seasons of college swimming, he was a member of the Gators' NCAA national championship relay team in the 4x200-yard freestyle relay as a sophomore in 2013, and was NCAA national runner-up in the 500-yard freestyle event in 2014 and 2015. He was the recipient of twelve All-American honours.

At the 2015 World Aquatics Championships in Kazan, Russia, Wallace won a gold medal as a member of the first-place British team in the men's 4×200-metre freestyle relay.

On 11 April 2018, after winning two Bronze medals at the 2018 Commonwealth Games in Australia, Wallace announced his retirement from swimming at the age of 24. He said, "I'd done everything I wanted to do within the sport so it was just about enjoying the last moments, the last Games, and the last chance to represent Scotland."

== See also ==
- List of Commonwealth Games medallists in swimming (men)
