= 2016 United States Olympic trials (swimming) =

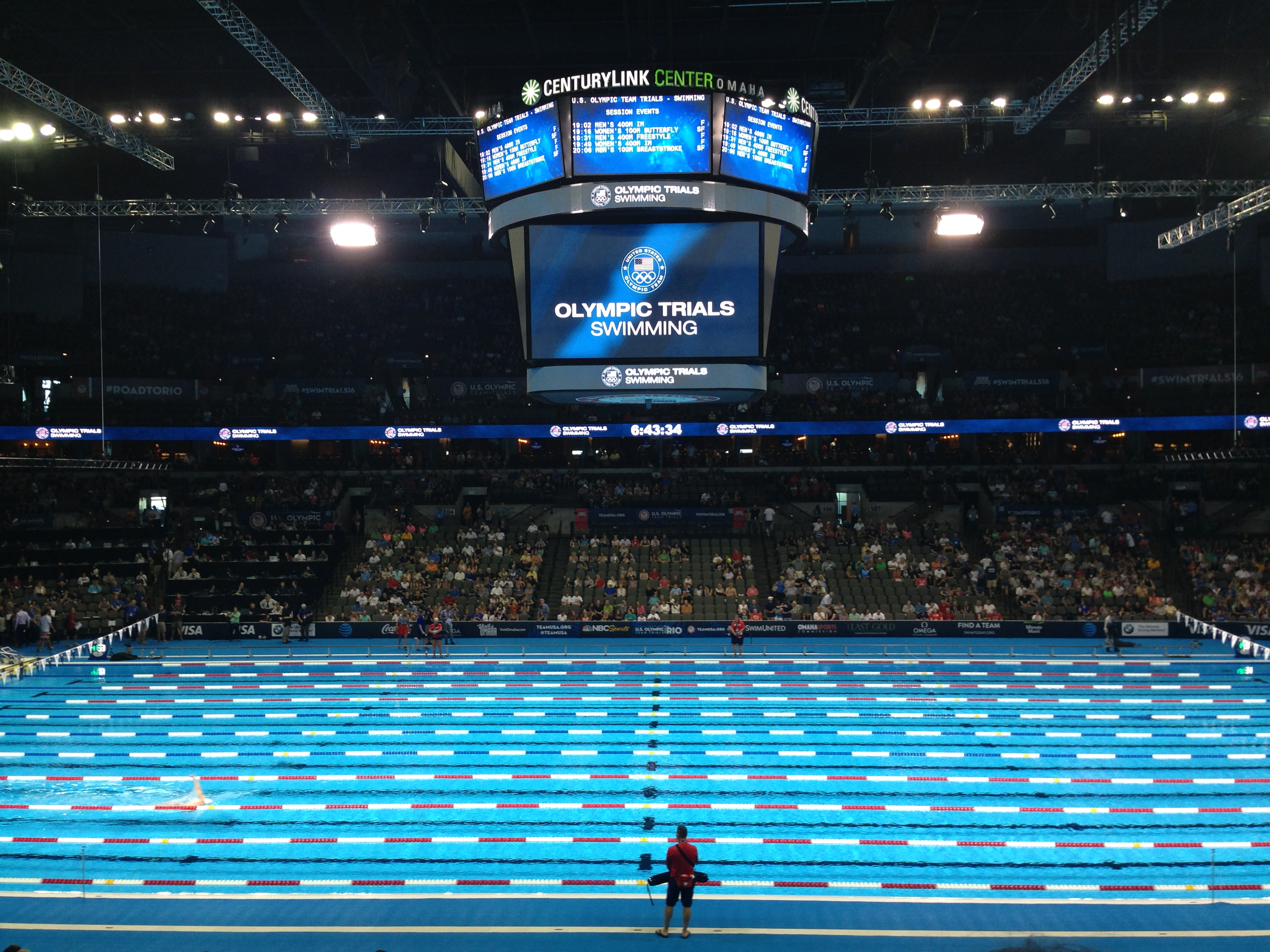
- Host city: Omaha, Nebraska, U.S.
- Date: June 26 – July 3
- Venue: CenturyLink Center
- Events: 26 (men: 13; women: 13)

The 2016 USA Swimming Olympic trials were held for the third straight quadrennial at CenturyLink Center Omaha in Omaha, Nebraska from June 26 to July 3, 2016. Those qualifying competed for the United States in Swimming at the 2016 Summer Olympics in Rio de Janeiro, Brazil.

== Qualification criteria ==
A maximum of 52 swimmers (26 of each sex, not including open water swimmers) were chosen for the 2016 Summer Olympics. To make the Olympic team, a swimmer must place in the top two in one of the thirteen individual events. To be considered for the U.S. 4×100-meter and 4×200-meter freestyle relay teams, a swimmer must place in the top six in the 100-meter and 200-meter freestyle, respectively. Swimmers must have achieved a time standard to be eligible to compete in the U.S. Olympic trials:

Event	Men	Women
50 m freestyle	23.29	26.19
100 m freestyle	50.49	56.49
200 m freestyle	1:51.89	2:02.59
400 m freestyle	3:58.69	4:17.99
800 m freestyle	—	8:49.99
1500 m freestyle	15:49.99	—
100 m backstroke	57.19	1:03.39
200 m backstroke	2:03.79	2:16.49
100 m breaststroke	1:03.69	1:11.49
200 m breaststroke	2:18.39	2:34.99
100 m butterfly	54.79	1:01.19
200 m butterfly	2:01.99	2:14.49
200 m individual medley	2:05.09	2:18.69
400 m individual medley	4:27.49	4:54.99

- Information retrieved from USA Swimming.

== Events ==
The meet featured twenty-six individual events all swam in a long course (50-meter) pool—thirteen events for men and thirteen events for women. Events 200 meters and shorter were held with preliminaries, semifinals and finals, while events 400 meters and longer were held with preliminaries and finals. Semifinals featured sixteen swimmers in two heats; the finals included eight swimmers in a single heat. Preliminaries were seeded with ten lanes. Event order, which mimicked that of the 2016 Olympics, with the exception of the Olympic relay events, was:

Date	Sunday June 26, 2016	Monday June 27, 2016	Tuesday June 28, 2016	Wednesday June 29, 2016
M o r n i n g	Men's 400 IM (heats); Women's 100 butterfly (heats); Men's 400 freestyle (heats); Women's 400 IM (heats); Men's 100 breaststroke (heats)	Women's 100 backstroke (heats); Men's 200 freestyle (heats); Women's 100 breaststroke (heats); Men's 100 backstroke (heats); Women's 400 freestyle (heats); Men's 100 backstroke (swim-off)	Women's 200 freestyle (heats); Men's 200 butterfly (heats); Women's 200 IM (heats)	Men's 100 freestyle (heats); Women's 200 butterfly (heats); Men's 200 breaststroke (heats)
E v e n i n g	Men's 400 IM (final); Women's 100 butterfly (semi-finals); Men's 400 freestyle (final); Women's 400 IM (final); Men's 100 breaststroke (semi-finals)	Women's 100 butterfly (final); Men's 200 freestyle (semi-finals); Women's 100 breaststroke (semi-finals); Men's 100 breaststroke (final); Women's 400 freestyle (final); Men's 100 backstroke (semi-finals); Women's 100 backstroke (semi-finals)	Women's 200 freestyle (semi-finals); Men's 200 freestyle (final); Women's 100 backstroke (final); Men's 100 backstroke (final); Women's 100 breaststroke (final); Men's 200 butterfly (semi-finals); Women's 200 IM (semi-finals)	Men's 100 freestyle (semi-finals); Women's 200 freestyle (final); Men's 200 butterfly (final); Women's 200 butterfly (semi-finals); Men's 200 breaststroke (semi-finals); Women's 200 IM (final)
Date	Thursday June 30, 2016	Friday July 1, 2016	Saturday July 2, 2016	Sunday July 3, 2016
M o r n i n g	Women's 100 freestyle (heats); Men's 200 backstroke (heats); Women's 200 breaststroke (heats); Men's 200 IM (heats); Men's 200 IM (swim-off)	Men's 50 freestyle (heats); Women's 800 freestyle (heats); Men's 100 butterfly (heats); Women's 200 backstroke (heats)	Women's 50 freestyle (heats); Men's 1500 freestyle (heats)	No morning session.
E v e n i n g	Men's 200 breaststroke (final); Women's 100 freestyle (semi-finals); Men's 200 backstroke (semi-finals); Women's 200 butterfly (final); Men's 100 freestyle (final); Women's 200 breaststroke (semi-finals); Men's 200 IM (semi-finals)	Men's 50 freestyle (semi-finals); Women's 200 breaststroke (final); Men's 200 backstroke (final); Women's 200 backstroke (semi-finals); Men's 200 IM (final); Women's 100 freestyle (final); Men's 100 butterfly (semi-finals); Men's 50 freestyle (swim-off)	Women's 200 backstroke (final); Men's 100 butterfly (final); Women's 800 freestyle (final); Men's 50 freestyle (final); Women's 50 freestyle (semi-finals)	Women's 50 freestyle (final); Men's 1500 freestyle (final)

== U.S. Olympic Team ==
The following swimmers qualified to compete at the 2016 Summer Olympics (for pool events):

=== Men ===
Nathan Adrian, Gunnar Bentz, Jack Conger, Kevin Cordes, Caeleb Dressel, Conor Dwyer, Anthony Ervin, Jimmy Feigen, Townley Haas, Ryan Held, Connor Jaeger, Chase Kalisz, Jay Litherland, Ryan Lochte, Cody Miller, Ryan Murphy, Jacob Pebley, Michael Phelps, Blake Pieroni, David Plummer, Josh Prenot, Tom Shields, Clark Smith, and Jordan Wilimovsky.

=== Women ===
Cammile Adams, Kathleen Baker, Elizabeth Beisel, Maya DiRado, Hali Flickinger, Missy Franklin, Molly Hannis, Lilly King, Katie Ledecky, Simone Manuel, Melanie Margalis, Katie Meili, Lia Neal, Cierra Runge, Allison Schmitt, Leah Smith, Olivia Smoliga, Dana Vollmer, Amanda Weir, Abbey Weitzeil, and Kelsi Worrell.

== Results ==
Key: Highlighted swimmers achieved the qualification conditions to be included in the Olympic team in that respective event.

=== Men's events ===
Event	Gold		Silver		Bronze	
50 m freestyle	Nathan Adrian	21.51	Anthony Ervin	21.52	Cullen Jones	21.75
100 m freestyle	Nathan Adrian	47.72	Caeleb Dressel	48.23	Ryan Held	48.26
200 m freestyle	Townley Haas	1:45.66	Conor Dwyer	1:45.67	Jack Conger	1:45.77
400 m freestyle	Connor Jaeger	3:43.79	Conor Dwyer	3:44.66	Townley Haas	3:45.04
1500 m freestyle	Connor Jaeger	14:47.61	Jordan Wilimovsky	14:49.19	Michael McBroom	15:06.60
100 m backstroke	Ryan Murphy	52.26	David Plummer	52.28	Matt Grevers	52.76
200 m backstroke	Ryan Murphy	1:53.95	Jacob Pebley	1:54.77	Tyler Clary	1:55.33
100 m breaststroke	Kevin Cordes	59.18	Cody Miller	59.26	Josh Prenot	59.81
200 m breaststroke	Josh Prenot	2:07.17 NR	Kevin Cordes	2:08.00	Will Licon	2:08.14
100 m butterfly	Michael Phelps	51.00	Tom Shields	51.20	Seth Stubblefield	51.24
200 m butterfly	Michael Phelps	1:54.84	Tom Shields	1:55.81	Jack Conger	1:56.45
200 m IM	Michael Phelps	1:55.91	Ryan Lochte	1:56.22	David Nolan	1:59.09
400 m IM	Chase Kalisz	4:09.54	Jay Litherland	4:11.02	Ryan Lochte	4:12.02

=== Women's events ===
Event	Gold		Silver		Bronze	
50 m freestyle	Abbey Weitzeil	24.28	Simone Manuel	24.33	Madison Kennedy	24.48
100 m freestyle	Abbey Weitzeil	53.28	Simone Manuel	53.52	Amanda Weir	53.75
200 m freestyle	Katie Ledecky	1:54.88	Missy Franklin	1:56.18	Leah Smith	1:56.63
400 m freestyle	Katie Ledecky	3:58.98	Leah Smith	4:00.65	Cierra Runge	4:07.04
800 m freestyle	Katie Ledecky	8:10.32	Leah Smith	8:20.18	Stephanie Peacock	8:24.71
100 m backstroke	Olivia Smoliga	59.02	Kathleen Baker	59.29	Amy Bilquist	59.37
200 m backstroke	Maya DiRado	2:06.90	Missy Franklin	2:07.89	Lisa Bratton	2:08.20
100 m breaststroke	Lilly King	1:05.20	Katie Meili	1:06.07	Molly Hannis	1:06.65
200 m breaststroke	Lilly King	2:24.08	Molly Hannis	2:24.39	Bethany Galat	2:24.52
100 m butterfly	Kelsi Worrell	56.48	Dana Vollmer	57.21	Kendyl Stewart	58.22
200 m butterfly	Cammile Adams	2:06.80	Hali Flickinger	2:07.50	Cassidy Bayer	2:08.68
200 m IM	Maya DiRado	2:09.54	Melanie Margalis	2:10.11	Caitlin Leverenz	2:10.16
400 m IM	Maya DiRado	4:33.73	Elizabeth Beisel	4:36.81	Bethany Galat	4:37.69
