= Giles Smith (swimmer) =

American swimmer (born 1991)

Personal information
- Born: November 28, 1991 (age 34) Baltimore, Maryland, U.S.

Sport
- Sport: Swimming
- Strokes: Butterfly, freestyle
- Club: DC Trident; Sun Devil Swimming
- College team: University of Arizona
Medal record
Pan American Games
Gold medal – first place	2015 Toronto	100m butterfly
World University Games
Bronze medal – third place	2013 Kazan	4×100m medley relay

Giles Smith (born November 28, 1991) is an American competitive swimmer who specializes in the butterfly and freestyle events. He currently represents the DC Trident which is part of the International Swimming League.

== Early life ==
Giles Smith was born November 28, 1991, in Baltimore, Maryland as the son of Harold and Marcia Smith. He attended McDonogh School. Smith swam collegiately at the University of Tennessee for a year and then transferred to the University of Arizona to continue his college career from 2012 to 2014.

== College career ==
During his freshman year with the Volunteers, Smith was a member of the 200 and 800-yard freestyle relays at the 2011 Men's NCAA Division I Championships and earned All-American Honors.

At the 2012 Men's NCAA Division I Championships as a sophomore, Smith placed second in the 100-yard butterfly and 14th in the 100-yard freestyle. He also contributed to the Wildcats 400-yard freestyle and medley relays, which finished in sixth and second place, respectively.

Smith gained momentum during his junior season as he was a member of the third place 200-yard medley and fourth place 200-yard freestyle relays at the 2013 Pac-12 Championships. He finished third in the 100-yard butterfly and eight in the 100-yard freestyle. At the 2013 Men's NCAA Division I Championships, Smith placed sixth in the 100-yard butterfly and 19th in the 50 free. He also contributed to the winning 400-yard medley relay, which was also a new NCAA and American record.

At the 2014 Pac-12 Championships, Smith gained the victory in the 100-yard butterfly (45.92) and both medley relays. He also finished 12th in the 100-yard freestyle, 22nd in the 50-yard freestyle and was a member of the 400-yard freestyle relay which got the silver medal. At his final NCAAs, Smith finished fourth in the 100-yard butterfly and was a member of the 200, 400 and 800-yard freestyle relays, which placed fourth, 14th and 12th, respectively.

== International career ==
Smith’s first national meet was the 2007 Speedo Junior Nationals at age 15. At the 2010 USA Swimming Championships, Smith achieved his first Olympic Trial cuts in the 100m freestyle and butterfly. At the 2012 United States Olympic Trials, he placed eight in the 100m butterfly and 50th in the 100m freestyle.

=== 2013 World University Games ===
Smith earned a spot for the 2013 World University Games in Kazan, Russia, by placing 15th in the 100m freestyle, seventh in the 100m butterfly and 5th in the 50m butterfly. At the meet, he won bronze as part of the 4x100m medley relay and anchored the 4x100mfreestyle relay to secure fourth place overall for team USA.

=== 2015 Pan American Games ===
At the 2015 Pan-American Games in Toronto, Smith won a gold medal in the 100m butterfly with a 52.04, which was also a new games record. In addition, Smith went home with a silver as being part of the 400m medley relay.

=== International Swimming League ===
Smith was a member of the inaugural International Swimming League (ISL) representing DC Trident. He competed at the first two matches held in Indianapolis, Indiana, and Naples, Italy, respectively, as well as in the American Derby held in College Park, Maryland.
