= Marcin Cieślak =

Polish swimmer

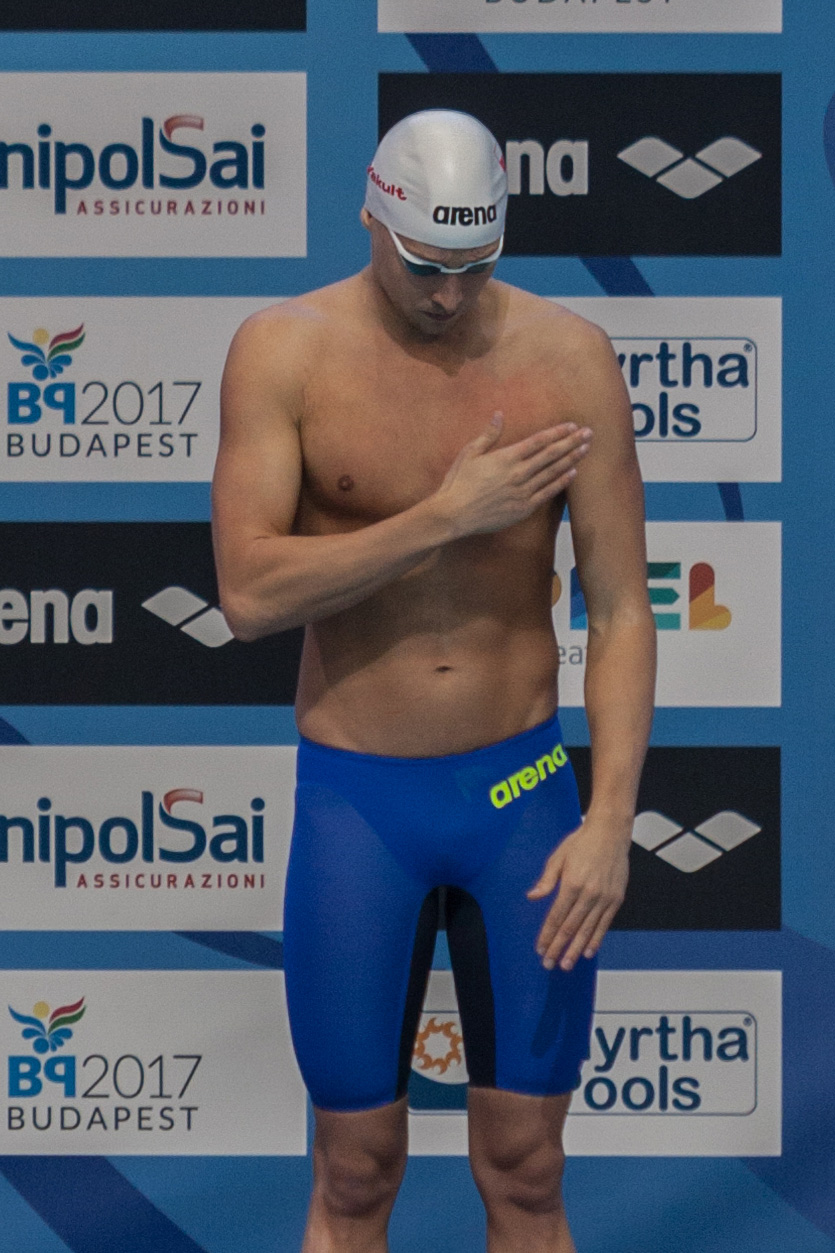
- Netanya 2015

Personal information
- Full name: Marcin Cieślak
- National team: Poland
- Born: 7 April 1992 (age 34) Warsaw, Poland
- Height: 1.92 m (6 ft 4 in)
- Weight: 90 kg (200 lb)

Sport
- Sport: Swimming
- Strokes: Butterfly
- Club: Cali Condors
- College team: University of Florida
Medal record
Men's swimming
Representing Poland
European Championships (SC)
Silver medal – second place	2019 Glasgow	4×50 m freestyle
Bronze medal – third place	2019 Glasgow	100 m butterfly
Youth Olympic Games
Bronze medal – third place	2010 Singapore	200 m butterfly
Representing the Florida Gators
NCAA Championships
Gold medal – first place	2014 Austin	100 y butterfly
Gold medal – first place	2014 Austin	200 y medley
Silver medal – second place	2014 Austin	200 y butterfly
Silver medal – second place	2014 Austin	4×200 y freestyle
Silver medal – second place	2014 Austin	4×100 y medley

Marcin Cieślak is a Polish competitive swimmer who specializes in butterfly. He currently represents the Cali Condors which is part of the International Swimming League. At the 2012 Summer Olympics in London, he competed in the men's 200 metre butterfly, finishing in 19th place overall in the heats, but failing to qualify for the semifinals. He also finished in 19th place in the 200 m individual medley.

In 2019, he won a silver medal in the men's 4 x 50 m freestyle relay and a bronze medal in the men's 100 m butterfly at the European Short Course Championships.

As of May 2026, he is the Polish record holder in the men's 50 m butterfly, the 100 m butterfly, 100 m medley and 200 m medley and was part of the Polish teams that hold the 4 x 50 m freestyle and 4 x 50 m medley relay records.

He was a member of the Florida Gators swimming team.
