= David Nolan (swimmer) =

American swimmer (born 1992)

Personal information
- National team: United States
- Born: December 5, 1992 (age 33) Hershey, Pennsylvania, U.S.
- Height: 6 ft 3 in (191 cm)
- Weight: 195 lb (88 kg)

Sport
- Sport: Swimming
- Strokes: Backstroke, Butterfly, Freestyle, Medley
- Club: North Baltimore Aquatic Club
- College team: Stanford University
- Coach: Bob Bowman
Medal record
Representing the Stanford Cardinal
Event	1st	2nd	3rd
NCAA Championships	3	4	6
Total	3	4	6
By race
Event	1st	2nd	3rd
100 y backstroke	1	2	0
200 y backstroke	0	2	2
200 y medley	2	0	2
4×200 y freestyle	0	0	2
Total	3	4	6
NCAA Championships
Gold medal – first place	2013 Indianapolis	100 y backstroke
Gold medal – first place	2013 Indianapolis	200 y medley
Gold medal – first place	2015 Iowa City	200 y medley
Silver medal – second place	2012 Federal Way	100 y backstroke
Silver medal – second place	2012 Federal Way	200 y backstroke
Silver medal – second place	2013 Indianapolis	200 y backstroke
Silver medal – second place	2015 Iowa City	100 y backstroke
Bronze medal – third place	2012 Federal Way	200 y medley
Bronze medal – third place	2014 Austin	200 y medley
Bronze medal – third place	2014 Austin	200 y backstroke
Bronze medal – third place	2014 Austin	4×200 y freestyle
Bronze medal – third place	2015 Iowa City	200 y backstroke
Bronze medal – third place	2015 Iowa City	4×200 y freestyle

David Nolan (born December 5, 1992) is an American swimmer and partner at Commit Analytics. He won two gold medals at the 2009 Jr. Pan Pacific Championships in the 200 IM and 400 medley relay. Nolan swam at and graduated from Stanford University. He set the National High School record for the 200y IM.

== Early life ==
Nolan was born in Hershey Pennsylvania to parents Theresa and James Nolan.

== Career ==
=== High School Swimming ===
In 2011 Nolan set 4 national high school records. He swam for Hershey High School (which has him on their honor wall), since he was born in Hershey as well as Hershey Aquatic Club. When committing to Stanford, Nolan had 5 national high school records, 7 state high school records, and was a high school All American.

=== College Swimming ===
Nolan swam for and graduated from Stanford University. He completed a degree in biomechanical engineering and a minor in computer science.

In 2015 he set the American Record in the 200y IM, swimming 1:40.07. The swim was one hundredth of a second faster than the previous record set by Ryan Lochte. He ended his college swimming career with 3 team records, 9 conference titles and 17 All-American honors. In 2014-15 his training focused on speed, whereas during the two years prior were almost pure aerobic training.

=== Post Graduate Swimming ===
In 2015 Nolan graduated from Stanford University and moved to Arizona to train under Bob Bowman. In 2016 Nolan swam in the US Olympic Trials in Omaha, placing third in the 200M Individual Medley.
