= Dave Durden =

American swimming coach

Biographical details
- Born: January 29, 1976 (age 50)
- Education: UC Irvine 1998

Playing career
- 1994–1997: UC Irvine; Coach Charlie Schober
- Positions: freestyle, butterfly

Coaching career (HC unless noted)
- 2002–2005: Auburn University; Asst. Coach to Dave Marsh
- 2005–2007: University of Maryland
- 2007–: University of California, Berkeley
- 2016: U.S. Olympic Men's Team; Asst. Coach
- 2020: U.S. Olympic Men's Team; Head coach

Accomplishments and honors

Championships
- As of 2023: 6 NCAA Championships (Asst. at Auburn); 6 NCAA Championships (U. Cal Berkeley) (2011–2012, 2014, 2019, 2022–2023)

Awards
- As of 2023: 7 x NCAA Coach of the Year (2010–2012, 2014, 2019, 2022–2023) 12 × Pac-10 Coach of the Year; Swim. World Mag. Coach of the Year '23

David Alan Durden is an American swimming coach, best known for serving as the men's head coach at University of California, Berkeley since 2007. With an exceptional history coaching Berkeley, as of 2023, he had led his teams to six NCAA Championships and eight second-place finishes in NCAA national competition, putting his teams first or second in NCAA national competition fourteen of his eighteen years as coach. As an assistant coach at Auburn University, he helped lead the Tigers to another six NCAA championships during his tenure. His Berkeley swimmers Nathan Adrian, Ryan Murphy, and Josh Prenot, have collectively won 15 Olympic medals, and at the 2016 Olympics, Durden's swimmers from Berkeley won eleven medals, including eight gold medals.

Durden was born on January 29, 1976. He began swimming around the age of eight, but grew tired of practices and quit when he was twelve, not returning to competition until he was a junior in high school. In 1994, he graduated from Jersey Village High in greater Houston, Texas, where he competed on their swim team, but did his primary training with Cypress Fairbanks Swim Club. In his senior year, swimming with an average high school team, he was the only swimmer from his school to qualify for and participate in the Texas Swimming and Diving State Championships.

== UC Irvine swimmer ==
Attending on an academic scholarship, Durden graduated UC Irvine in 1998 with an electrical engineering degree. From 1994 to 1997, he swam with the Irvine Anteaters under Coach Charlie Schober, and was a 1997 200 butterfly Big West Conference champion. High school friend and fellow Cypress Fairbanks swimmer David McGlynn also swam with him at UC Irvine, and roomed with him as a UC Irvine underclassman. Durden's best events in college were the 200 and 500-yard freestyle, and the 100 and 200-yard butterfly.

== Coaching career ==
From 2002 to 2005, Durden was an assistant coach under Head Coach David Marsh at Auburn University, where he aided their swim team in capturing a remarkable six NCAA team championships. The men won the NCAA in 2003–2005, and the women won championships from 2002 to 2004. Auburn had a very strong swimming program when Durden was hired as assistant coach, as by April 2005, near the end of his coaching tenure, the men's team had won nine consecutive SEC titles, and five NCAA Championships. From 2005 through 2007, he directed the men's and women's teams as head coach at the University of Maryland.

=== University of California, Berkeley ===
As the head coach of the University of California, Berkeley since 2007, his teams have captured the NCAA Championship six times (in 2011, 2012, 2014, 2019, 2022, and 2023), and finished with a first or second-place ranking in fourteen successive seasons. Since 2022, former Auburn head coach Dave Marsh has served as an associate head coach under Durden at Cal.

The University of Texas has been Cal's primary rival in NCAA Championships during Durden's time as coach. In 2011, Durden's team defeated Texas for the NCAA Championship in Minneapolis, and in 2012, they defeated Texas again to repeat as NCAA champions in Seattle. In 2014, they defeated rival Texas for a third time, in Texas's home city of Austin. They defeated Texas again in Austin in 2019 to take their fourth NCAA Championship. In 2022, Cal defeated Texas in Atlanta, Georgia for their fifth NCAA championship under Durden, all with Texas as runner-up. In 2023, in Greensboro, North Carolina, Berkeley took their sixth NCAA team championship under Durden, with Arizona State as runner-up.

In 2016, Durden sent six of his Berkeley men's team to the Olympics in Rio de Janeiro, where they won a total of eleven medals. These included triple gold medal winner in two backstroke and a medley relay event, Ryan Murphy, double gold medal winner Anthony Ervin in the 50 freestyle and the 4x100 free relay events, and Nathan Adrian, who won a gold in both the free and medley relays, and a bronze each in the 100 and 50 freestyle. His 2016 Olympians also included 200 breaststroke silver medalist Josh Prenot, 4x100 medley relay gold medal winner Tom Shields, and backstroke participant Jacob Pebley.

=== International coaching ===
In 2018, USA Swimming selected Durden as the head coach for the 2020 US Olympic Men's Swimming Team. Durden had previously served as Assistant U.S. Men's Olympic Coach for the 2016 Olympics.

He was named Coach of the Meet at the 2016 US Olympic Swimming Trials.

In 2015, Durden served as head coach of the US Men's Swimming team at the world championships in Kazan, Russia. He previously worked as an assistant coach for Dave Salo's Novaquatics.

Durden returned as Head U.S. Men's Coach for the 2017 and 2019 World Championships, and was the U.S. Men's Assistant World Championship coach in 2011.

As of 2020, Durden lived in Moraga, California with his wife Cathy, their son Jack, and their daughter Mia.

=== Honors ===
For his many NCAA Championships with UC Berkeley, and work with international teams from 2007 through 2025, Durden has been named NCAA Coach of the Year seven times, in the years 2010–2012, 2014, 2019, and 2022–2023. As of 2023, he had been named the PAC 12 Swimming Coach of the Year twelve times, and was a seven time CSCAA National Men's Coach of the Year. In 2023, he was Swimming World Magazine's American Coach of the Year.
