= Mathias Gydesen =

Danish swimmer

Personal information
- Born: August 24, 1988 (age 38) Allerød, Denmark

Sport
- Sport: Swimming
- Strokes: Backstroke

Mathias Gydesen (born 24 August 1988) is a Danish swimmer. At the 2012 Summer Olympics he finished 30th overall in the heats in the Men's 100 metre backstroke and failed to reach the semifinals.
