= Tom Shields =

American swimmer (born 1991)

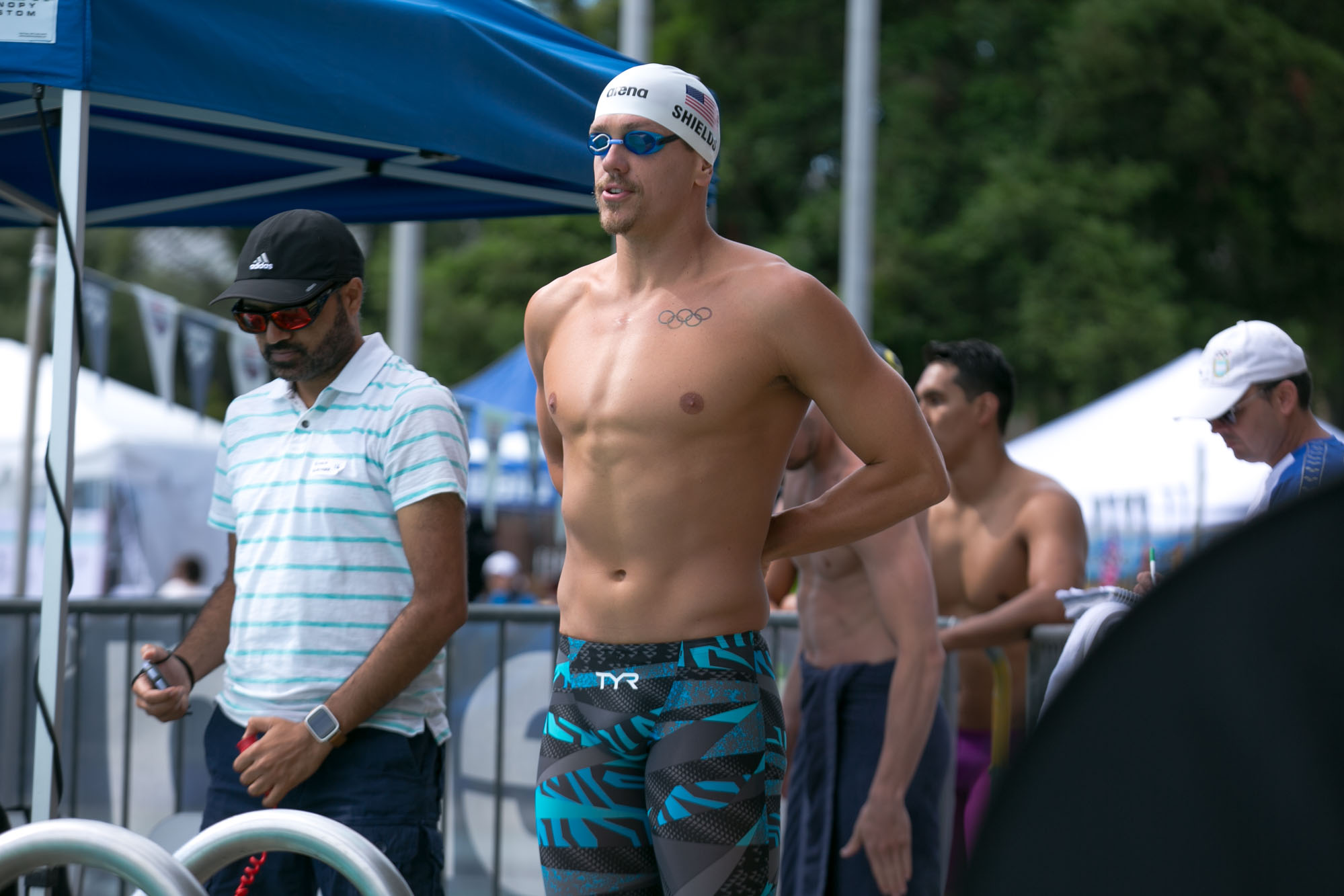
- Shields in 2017

Personal information
- Full name: Thomas Allen Shields
- Nicknames: "Tom", "US rocket", "BeefyT"
- National team: United States
- Born: July 11, 1991 (age 35) Panama City, Florida, U.S.
- Height: 6 ft 4 in (193 cm)
- Weight: 200 lb (91 kg)

Sport
- Sport: Swimming
- Strokes: Butterfly, freestyle, backstroke
- Club: California Aquatics
- College team: U. California, Berkeley
- Coach: Dave Durden (Berkeley)
Medal record
Men's swimming
Representing United States
Olympic Games
| Gold medal – first place | 2016 Rio de Janeiro | 4×100 m medley |
| Gold medal – first place | 2020 Tokyo | 4×100 m medley |
World Championships (LC)
| Gold medal – first place | 2015 Kazan | 4×100 m medley |
World Championships (SC)
| Gold medal – first place | 2012 Istanbul | 4×100 m medley |
| Gold medal – first place | 2016 Windsor | 4×50 m medley mixed |
| Gold medal – first place | 2021 Abu Dhabi | 4×50 m medley |
| Silver medal – second place | 2012 Istanbul | 100 m butterfly |
| Silver medal – second place | 2014 Doha | 4×50 m freestyle |
| Silver medal – second place | 2014 Doha | 100 m butterfly |
| Silver medal – second place | 2014 Doha | 4×100 m medley |
| Silver medal – second place | 2016 Windsor | 50 m butterfly |
| Silver medal – second place | 2016 Windsor | 100 m butterfly |
| Silver medal – second place | 2016 Windsor | 200 m butterfly |
| Silver medal – second place | 2016 Windsor | 4×50 m freestyle |
| Silver medal – second place | 2016 Windsor | 4×50 m medley |
| Bronze medal – third place | 2012 Istanbul | 50 m butterfly |
| Bronze medal – third place | 2014 Doha | 4×100 m freestyle |
| Bronze medal – third place | 2014 Doha | 4×50 m medley |
| Bronze medal – third place | 2016 Windsor | 4×100 m freestyle |
| Bronze medal – third place | 2021 Abu Dhabi | 4×100 m freestyle |
Pan American Games
| Gold medal – first place | 2019 Lima | 100 m butterfly |
| Gold medal – first place | 2019 Lima | 4×100 m medley |
Summer Universiade
| Gold medal – first place | 2011 Shenzhen | 4×200 m freestyle |
| Silver medal – second place | 2011 Shenzhen | 100 m butterfly |
| Silver medal – second place | 2011 Shenzhen | 4×100 m medley |

USA Swimming: Shields first swimmer under 44 seconds in 100yd butterfly

Thomas Allen Shields (born July 11, 1991) is an American competitive swimmer. He is a two-time Olympian and the current American record-holder in the short course 50-meter butterfly and 200-meter butterfly. At the 2016 Summer Olympics, he won a gold medal in the 4×100-meter medley relay, swimming the butterfly leg of the relay in the prelims. Later the same year, he became the first American to swim faster than 44 seconds in the 100-yard butterfly, setting a new American record of 43.84 seconds.

For the 2020 Summer Olympics, he swam the butterfly leg of the 4×100-meter medley relay in the prelims, winning a gold medal when the finals relay finished first. At the Kazan stop of the 2021 FINA Swimming World Cup, Shields was the only swimmer representing the United States to compete, winning two gold medals and one silver medal in individual events. For the whole 2021 World Cup, Shields was the highest scoring American competitor and second-highest scoring male competitor.

== Background ==
Shields was born in Panama City, Florida, while his father was stationed at Tyndall Air Force Base. When he was two years old, his parents moved him and his older sister, Lindy, to Huntington Beach, California. Once in Orange County, he began swimming competitively when he was eight years old.

For high school, Shields attended Edison High School where he swam on the Varsity Swim Team all four years, receiving multiple awards, breaking the National High School record in the 200 yard freestyle with a time of 1:33.83, and ending his high school career with an induction into the Edison High School Hall of Fame in 2009. He attended the University of California, Berkeley from 2010 to 2013, where he swam under Head Coach Dave Durden and graduated with an undergraduate degree in religious studies in 2013.

== 2008–2015 ==
At the 2008 U.S. Olympic Team Trials in Omaha, Nebraska, Shields placed 45th in the 200-meter freestyle with a time of 1:51.74, 54th in the 400-meter freestyle at 4:00.83, 72nd in the 200-meter butterfly with a time of 2:04.78, and 89th in the 100-meter butterfly in 55.77 seconds.

=== 2010 NCAA Championships ===
At the 2010 NCAA Division I Championships, he won the 100-yard butterfly, placed second in the 200-yard butterfly, and was 16th in the 200-yard freestyle. Both of his butterfly efforts broke 17-18 National Age Group records setting new records of 44.91 in the 100-yard butterfly and 1:41.59 in the 200-yard butterfly. He was on the winning 4x100-yard medley relay, and the winning 4x100-yard freestyle relay. He helped his university team, the California Golden Bears, finish second to the Texas Longhorns in the championships. For his performances in the NCAA his freshman year, Shields won the "Freshman/Newcomer of the Year" award from the Pac-12 Conference.

=== 2011 NCAA Championships ===
At the 2011 NCAA Division I Championships, Shields won the 100-yard backstroke in 45.02 seconds, finished in second place in the 100-yard butterfly at 44.91 seconds, and placed third in the 200-yard butterfly with a time of 1:41.20. He was the first champion from the California Golden Bears in the 100-yard backstroke at an NCAA Division I Swimming and Diving Championships. He anchored the second place 4×50-yard freestyle relay, the winning 4×100-yard freestyle relay, and the second place in 4×200-yard freestyle relay. For the medley relays, Shields swam the butterfly leg of each relay. His team won the championships, narrowly defeating the Texas Longhorns who won the championships the year before.

=== 2011 Summer Universiade ===
At the 2011 Summer Universiade in Shenzhen, Shields earned the first international medal of his career, a gold, in the 4×200-meter freestyle relay for his contribution in the heats. Shields earned his first individual medal, a silver, in the 100-meter butterfly, finishing behind compatriot Tim Phillips. Shields also earned a silver medal in the 4×100-meter medley relay for his contribution in the heats.

=== 2012 NCAA Championships ===
Shields finished first in the 100-yard butterfly with a time of 44.76 and first in the 100-yard backstroke in 44.86 seconds at the 2012 NCAA Division I Men's Swimming and Diving Championships. He finished second to teammate Will Hamilton in the 200-yard butterfly with his time of 1:41.07. He also anchored the 4x100-yard freestyle relay with a split of 41.79 seconds, and led-off the 4x200-yard freestyle relay. He swam the butterfly leg in both the 4x50-yard medley relay, splitting 19.80, and the first-place finishing 4x100-yard medley relay, splitting a 43.56. His team, the University of California, Berkeley, California Golden Bears repeated as champions, and he received the "Swimmer of the Meet" award from the NCAA and the "Swimmer of the Year" award from the Pac-12 Conference.

=== 2012 US Olympic Trials ===
At the 2012 U.S. Olympic Team Trials, Shields finished fourth place in the 100-meter butterfly behind Michael Phelps, Tyler McGill, and Ryan Lochte, with a time of 51.86. He placed ninth in the 200-meter butterfly semi-finals with a time of 1:58.75. Additionally, he competed in the 100-meter freestyle, finishing twenty-first in the heats at 49.96 seconds.

=== 2012 World Short Course Championships ===
2012 World Championships (SC)
| Gold medal – first place | 4×100 m medley | 3:21.03 |
| Silver medal – second place | 100 m butterfly | 49.54 |
| Bronze medal – third place | 50 m butterfly | 22.46 (NR) |

Shields competed at the 2012 FINA World Swimming Championships (25m) in Istanbul, Turkey. He placed second in the 100-meter butterfly with a time of 49.54, finishing 0.72 seconds behind gold medalist Chad le Clos of South Africa, and third in the 50-meter butterfly in 22.46 seconds, which was 0.24 seconds slower than gold medalist Nicholas Santos of Brazil and 0.20 seconds slower than silver medalist Chad le Clos. Shields's time in the 50-meter butterfly was a new American record. Additionally, the relay team of Matt Grevers, Kevin Cordes, Shields, and Ryan Lochte swam to a gold medal finish in the 4×100-meter medley relay with Shields splitting a 48.66 for the butterfly leg of the relay in the final.

=== 2013 NCAA Championships ===
Concluding his collegiate career in 2013, Shields achieved two first-place finishes at the 2013 NCAA Division I Championships, one in the 100-yard butterfly with his time of 44.59 and the other in the 200-yard butterfly where he won with a time of 1:39.65. He also earned a second-place finish in the 100-yard backstroke in 45.21 seconds. Shields's time in the 200-yard butterfly tied Michael Phelps's time for the fastest short course yards time by an American swimmer in history, tying the American record in the event. His team, California Golden Bears, finished second in the year's championships to the University of Michigan.

=== 2013 Swimming World Cup and Duel in the Pool ===
After not qualifying for the 2013 World Aquatics Championships, Shields swam a new American record time in the short course 200-meter butterfly at the 2013 World Cup stop in Eindhoven with a time of 1:51.38, which broke the record set in 2011 by Davis Tarwater at 1:51.90. He also posted a personal best of 49.32 in the 100-meter butterfly at the same meet. A few days later at the World Cup stop in Berlin, Shields lowered his own American record in the 200-meter butterfly to 1:51.31 and broke the American record set by Ian Crocker in the 100-meter butterfly in 2004 at 49.07 seconds with his time of 49.01 seconds. A few months later, at the World Cup stop in Doha, Qatar, Shields set a new American record in the short course 100-meter butterfly, becoming the first American swimmer to break 49 seconds in the event by lowering the American record of 49.01 to 48.80 seconds. Bringing 2013 to a close, Shields broke his American record of 1:51.31 in the 200-meter butterfly with a time of 1:50.61 at the 2013 Duel in the Pool in Glasgow, Scotland.

=== 2014–2015 ===
In the two years that followed, Shields found a groove with the short course 200-meter butterfly race and went on to break his American twice more, first lowering the American record to a 1:50.08 at the 2014 FINA Swimming World Cup stop in Doha, Qatar. Then becoming the first male American swimmer to break 1:50.00 in the event when he dropped over a second from his previous best time to break his own record and set a new American record and US Open record of 1:49.05 in the event at the 2015 Duel in the Pool in Indianapolis. The prior day of competition, he set a new American record and US Open record in the short course 100-meter butterfly with a time of 48.63 seconds that bettered the American record set by himself in 2013 at 48.80 seconds. On December 11, 2015, he also set a US Open record in the short course 50-meter butterfly with a time of 22.56 seconds swum en route to his final time of 48.63 seconds in the 100-meter butterfly, that is, his first 50 meters of the 100-meter butterfly set the new US Open record in the 50-meter butterfly.

== 2016–2022 ==
=== 2016 Summer Olympics ===
2016 Summer Olympics
| Gold medal – first place | 4×100 m medley relay | 3:27.95 |

In 2016, Shields placed second in the 100-meter butterfly and 200-meter butterfly at the US Olympic Swimming Trials, qualifying for the 2016 US Olympic Swim Team. As the 2016 Olympic Games were Shields's first Olympic Games, this made him 25 years old at his Olympic debut.

At the 2016 Summer Olympics in Rio de Janeiro, Brazil, Shields won a gold medal for his efforts as part of the 4×100-meter medley relay. Specifically, he swam the butterfly leg of the relay in the prelims of the event. In the prelims heats of the 200-meter butterfly, Shields placed 20th with a time of 1:56.93. For the 100-meter butterfly, Shields placed seventh in the final with a time of 51.73 seconds, which was 1.34 seconds behind gold medalist Joseph Schooling of Singapore and 0.59 seconds slower than silver medalists Michael Phelps of the United States, Chad le Clos of South Africa, and László Cseh of Hungary.

=== 2016 US Winter Nationals ===
In December 2016 at the US Winter National Championships in Atlanta, Georgia, Shields became the first American to swim the 100-yard butterfly faster than 44 seconds. His swim set a new American record and US Open record in the race with a time of 43.84. He also became the fastest American swimmer in a textile swimsuit in the race, the previous fastest swim in a textile suit was earlier the same year by Caeleb Dressel who swam a time of 44.40.

=== 2020 International Swimming League ===
During the 2020 International Swimming League, Shields competed for the team LA Current, earning the Most Valuable Player award for match 5, which was against teams London Roar, Tokyo Frog Kings, and DC Trident in the regular season. In the end of the season semifinals to determine who made the final match of the year's league, Shields set a new American record in the short course 200-meter butterfly with a time of 1:49.02 that broke his own record of 1:49.05 from five years prior. In the final match of the season, Shields became the first American swimmer to break 1:49.00 in the 200-meter butterfly, dropping almost four tenths of a second off his previous best time to lower his own American record to 1:48.66.

=== 2020 Summer Olympics ===
2020 Summer Olympics
| Gold medal – first place | 4×100 m medley relay | 3:26.78 |

Shields qualified for the 2020 Summer Olympics in Tokyo, Japan, in the 100-meter butterfly and the 4×100-meter medley relay. He swam a 51.19, placing second at the US Olympic Trials behind Caeleb Dressel. It was the second consecutive Olympic Games Shields qualified to compete in. Shields achieving a spot on his second US Olympic Team was a monumental personal triumph as he worked through mental health issues such as attempting suicide to make it on the team. He was one of six California Golden Bears to make the 2020 US Olympic Team in swimming.

On day six of competition, in the prelims of the 100-meter butterfly, Shields tied for 12th overall with a time of 51.57 and advanced to the semifinals. Later in the evening, Shields became one of the first individuals to swim in the first male and female, mixed gender, swimming race in the history of the Olympic Games by swimming the butterfly leg of the 4×100-meter mixed medley relay in the prelims. The relay ranked second for both prelims heats and advanced to the final. In the morning of day seven, Shields swam in the semifinals of the 100-meter butterfly and did not advance to the final. In the evening, Shields helped advance the 4×100-meter medley relay to the final with Hunter Armstrong, Andrew Wilson, and Blake Pieroni. In the final of the 4×100-meter medley relay on day nine, Caeleb Dressel substituted in for Shields on the relay and the relay finished first and won the gold medal, including Shields and the others who swam on the prelims relay.

Shield's persistence in pushing past his inner demons to not commit suicide, make the 2020 US Olympic Team, and earn a gold medal for his role swimming butterfly on the prelims 4×100-meter medley relay was enough for the USA Swimming Foundation to nominate him for their Golden Goggle Award entitled "Perseverance Award", though his performance on the relay was not good enough for him to be included in the relay's nomination for "Relay Performance of the Year" as that honor was reserved for finals relay swimmers only.

=== 2021 Swimming World Cup ===
==== Stop 1: Berlin ====
Shields decided to partake in the short course meters 2021 FINA Swimming World Cup starting at the first stop in Berlin, Germany where he was called a standout swimmer to watch in the 100-meter butterfly race by SwimSwam. Come race time in the 100-meter butterfly on October 1, Shields won the gold medal with a time of 48.67 seconds, finishing over three tenths of a second ahead of second-place finisher Chad le Clos of South Africa. In the 50-meter butterfly, Shields won his second gold medal of the Berlin stop with a personal best time of 22.09 seconds in the final that was just five hundredths of a second off the American record in the event. His time of 1:50.51 in the final of the 200-meter butterfly earned him the silver medal in the event. In addition to the events he medaled in, Shields also competed in the 100-meter backstroke where he placed 12th in the prelims heats with a time of 53.78 seconds.

==== Stop 2: Budapest ====
2021 World Cup — Budapest
| Gold medal – first place | 100 m butterfly | 48.83 |
| Gold medal – first place | 200 m butterfly | 1:51.18 |
| Gold medal – first place | 50 m butterfly | 21.99 (NR) |
| Gold medal – first place | 100 m backstroke | 50.50 |

In advance of the second World Cup stop, which took place in Budapest, Hungary, Shields was once again called a swimmer to watch for his butterfly events, this time by Swimming World and FINA. Day one of competition, October 7, Shields won the gold medal in the 100-meter butterfly, finishing over one full second ahead of silver medalist Kristóf Milák of Hungary with his time of 48.83 seconds. With a swim of 1:58.12 in the prelims heats of the 200-meter butterfly on the morning of day two, Shields qualified for the final ranked fifth. In the final, he squashed the competition with his time of 1:51.18, finishing over three full seconds ahead of the second-place finisher to achieve the gold medal in the event. The third morning of competition, Shields qualified for the final of the 50-meter butterfly with a time of 22.59 seconds in the prelims. Later in the morning he also qualified for the final of the 100-meter backstroke, swimming a 53.89 and ranking seventh. In the final of the 50-meter butterfly, Shields broke the American record of 22.04 set by Caeleb Dressel with his time of 21.99 seconds, which earned him the gold medal and made him the first male American swimmer to swim faster than 22 seconds in the event. His swim moved him up in rankings to the fastest American and sixth fastest swimmer globally in the event up to that point in time. Rounding out a golden finals session, Shields won the gold medal in the 100-meter backstroke with a time of 50.50 seconds in the final that was less than four tenths of a second off his best time in the event from 2013. Shields achieved both of his gold medals on day three in a time span of approximately 15 minutes. Shields's breaking the American record in the 50-meter butterfly was chosen by Swimming World as the No. 1 for their "The Week That Was" honor for the week of October 11. His performances overall in Budapest earned him the position of top scoring male athlete at the World Cup stop.

==== Stop 3: Doha ====
2021 World Cup — Doha
| Gold medal – first place | 100 m butterfly | 49.46 |
| Gold medal – first place | 50 m butterfly | 22.22 |
| Silver medal – second place | 100 m backstroke | 51.12 |
| Bronze medal – third place | 200 m butterfly | 1:53.11 |

For stop three of four, held in Doha, Qatar, Shields was noted as one of the highlight athletes from the United States contingent to watch at the World Cup stop by Swimming World. In addition to his four gold medal events from the Budapest stop, the 50-meter butterfly, 100-meter butterfly, 200-meter butterfly, and 100-meter backstroke, Shields added the 50-meter backstroke to his entries list for competition in Doha for a total of five individual events.

Shields kickstarted competition with the first race of the prelims heats on day one, the 100-meter butterfly, swimming a 52.44, ranking fourth overall and qualifying for the final. He finished in a time of 49.46 seconds in the evening final, placing first and winning the gold medal. Prior to the start of day two of competition, Shields removed himself from the 50-meter backstroke event, forgoing the lane assignment stage of race preparation and competition in the event entirely. In the timed final of the 200-meter butterfly on day two, Shields placed third with a time of 1:43.11, winning the bronze medal in the event a few seconds after gold medalist Daiya Seto of Japan and five hundredths of a second after silver medalist Kregor Zirk of Estonia touched the wall. For his first event on the final day of competition in Doha, Shields started off the prelims session with a 22.88 in the 50-meter butterfly, qualifying for the final ranking second. In his second event of the morning, Shields ranked eighth of the prelims heats of the 100-meter backstroke with a 57.87, qualifying for the final. In the 50-meter butterfly final, he won the gold medal in a time of 22.22 seconds, finishing 0.02 seconds ahead of second-place finisher Kyle Chalmers of Australia. A short while later, Shields wrapped up his competition in Doha by winning the silver medal in the 100-meter backstroke with a time of 51.12 seconds in the final.

==== Stop 4: Kazan ====
2021 World Cup — Kazan
| Gold medal – first place | 100 m butterfly | 49.20 |
| Gold medal – first place | 200 m butterfly | 1:52.42 |
| Silver medal – second place | 50 m butterfly | 22.19 |

FINA noted Shields as someone to watch in his competitions at the fourth and final stop of the World Cup circuit, held at the Palace of Water Sports in Kazan, Russia, with his best times in the 50-meter butterfly and 100-meter butterfly from stops one to three of the World Cup garnering him the term "US rocket". He was the only swimmer representing the United States to enter to compete at the Kazan stop. On day one of competition, October 28, Shields ranked third in the prelims heats of the 100-meter butterfly and advanced to the final in the evening with his time of 51.31 seconds. He won the gold medal in the final, swimming a 49.20 to finish over eight tenths of a second ahead of the next fastest competitor. Speaking to FINA about his first win of the stop, his competitors, and his motivation, Shields said:

A good start of the competition. Impressive indeed. I loved the finish. I love swimming with the guys, they are very strong. Every time I go out, I strive to win, I don't think of the overall challenge. We shall never cease working hard and take these medals as a motivation for the coming challenges, and there will be a lot of them in during the FINA Worlds in Abu Dhabi.

His win in the 100-meter butterfly made it four-for-four gold medals in the event for Shields at the year's World Cup circuit, winning the gold medal at each of the four stops. The next day, Shields advanced to the final of the 200-meter butterfly ranking fifth with a time of 1:57.83 from the prelims heats. He swam a time of 1:52.42 in the final to win the gold medal in the event nine tenths of a second ahead of Louis Croenen of Belgium. In the morning of the final day of competition for the World Cup circuit, Shields qualified for the final of the 50-meter butterfly ranked first with a time of 22.51 that was seven-hundredths of a second ahead of second-ranked Szebasztián Szabó of Hungary. He concluded his competition for the World Cup winning the silver medal in the 50-meter butterfly with a time of 22.19 seconds, which was a little over two tenths of a second slower than Szebasztián Szabó who won the gold medal in 21.97 seconds. Shields took second-place in terms of being the highest scoring male competitor for the entirety of the 2021 World Cup circuit, winning $103,500 of prize money and finishing less than three points behind the highest scoring male competitor, Matthew Sates of South Africa who scored 227 points. He took second for total number of medals won by a male competitor, winning fourteen total medals, ten of which were gold, three of which were silver, and one of which was bronze, and achieving the exact same medal count and distribution as Emma McKeon of Australia.

Shields's consistent performances and national record in the 50-meter butterfly he achieved as part of the four-stop World Cup circuit in the month of October earned him the "Ultra Swimmer of the Month" honor from SwimSwam for the month of October. His winning fourteen total medals tied Maria Ugolkova of Switzerland winning sixteen total medals as the number eight moment of the 2021 Swimming World Cup as determined by FINA.

=== 2021 International Swimming League ===
Team LA Current selected Shields to compete for them in the 2021 International Swimming League. On the first day of the final match of the season, December 3, Shields won the 100-meter butterfly with a time of 49.03 seconds, finishing two-tenths of a second ahead of second-place finisher Caeleb Dressel of the Cali Condors, and earning 10 points for his team. Shields was entered to swim the 4x100-meter medley relay later the same day with Ryan Murphy, Christopher Rothbauer, and Maxime Rooney. Come race time, the relay switched up its members, something typically resulting in a disqualification but allowed by the officials this time, dropping Christopher Rothbauer and adding Javier Acevedo and finished fourth overall with a time of 3:23.75, which earned their team 10 points. In the first event Shields swam on the second day of the final match, the 50-meter butterfly, he placed second with a time of 22.27 seconds, behind Ben Proud of Energy Standard, and earned 7 points for his team. For his final event of the 2021 year as part of the International Swimming League, Shields competed in the 50-meter butterfly skins race and earned 21 points for his team, finishing second overall in a field of competitors different than the 50-meter butterfly event as some of the competitors in the skins event chose to sit-out the non-skins 50-meter butterfly event. By the end of the 2021 season, Shields had earned 666.8 most valuable player points in eighteen matches as part of the International Swimming League since its beginning in 2019, ranking sixth out of 488 competitors.

=== 2021 World Short Course Championships ===
2021 World Championships (SC)
| Gold medal – first place | 4×50 m medley | 1:30.51 (CR, AM) |
| Bronze medal – third place | 4×100 m freestyle | 3:05.42 |

For his individual events at the 2021 World Short Course Championships in Abu Dhabi, United Arab Emirates in December, USA Swimming named Shields to the US roster in the 50-meter and 100-meter butterfly. USA Swimming announcing the team, including Shields, for the Championships ranked as number two for Swimming World's "The Week That Was" honor the week of November 1, 2021.

On the first day of competition, Shields split a 47.07 for the second leg of the 4×100-meter freestyle relay in the prelims, helping advance the relay to the final ranked second with Shaine Casas, Ryan Held, and Hunter Tapp. The finals relay, on which Zach Apple substituted in for Shields, finished third and all prelims and finals relay members earned a bronze medal for their contributions. The next day, Shields advanced to the semifinals of the 100-meter butterfly with a 50.57 in the prelims heats, which ranked him 16th overall. In the semifinals Shields ranked seventh with a time of 49.76 seconds, which was six-hundredths of a second slower than sixth-ranked Simon Bucher of Austria. Shields placed sixth in the final of the 100-meter butterfly with a time of 49.80 seconds. Day four, Shields helped advance the 4×50-meter freestyle relay to the final in the prelims heats, splitting a 21.26 for the anchor leg of the relay. He followed up his relay performance with a time of 22.88 in the prelims heats of the 50-meter butterfly, which qualified him for the semifinals ranking fourteenth. In the final of the 4×50-meter freestyle relay, Shields and Hunter Tapp were substituted out for Ryan Held and Shaine Casas and the finals relay placed fourth in 1:23.81. Finishing off the fourth day, Shields qualified for the final of the 50-meter butterfly ranking fifth in the semifinals with a time of 22.29 seconds, nine-hundredths of a second behind fourth-ranked Matteo Rivolta of Italy.

On the finals relay in the 4×50-meter medley relay on day five, Shields split a 21.75 for the butterfly leg of the relay to help set a new American record, tie for the gold medal and tie the Championships record and Americas record with relay teammates Shaine Casas, Nic Fink, and Ryan Held in a time of 1:30.51. In the final of the 50-meter butterfly during the same session, Shields placed seventh with a time of 22.42 seconds. After Shields returned to the United States following the Championships, he announced he was diagnosed with pneumonia twice after the Championships and it may have played a role in his performances at the Championships.

== International championships (50 m) ==
| Meet | 100 fly | 200 fly | 4×200 free | 4×100 medley | 4×100 mixed medley |
|---|---|---|---|---|---|
| WUG 2011 | 2nd place, silver medalist(s) | | (gold) ^{[a]} | (silver) ^{[a]} | —N/a |
| PAC 2014 | 4th (h) | DSQ | | | —N/a |
| WC 2015 | 4th | 8th | | 1st place, gold medalist(s) | |
| OG 2016 | 7th | 20th | | (gold) ^{[a]} | —N/a |
| PAN 2019 | 1st place, gold medalist(s) | 8th | | 1st place, gold medalist(s) | DSQ |
| OG 2020 | 15th | | | (gold) ^{[a]} | 5th^{[a]} |

^{a} Shields swam only in the preliminary heats.

== International championships (25 m) ==
| Meet | 50 fly | 100 fly | 200 fly | 100 medley | 4×50 free | 4×100 free | 4×50 medley | 4×100 medley | 4×50 mixed medley |
|---|---|---|---|---|---|---|---|---|---|
| WC 2012 | 3rd place, bronze medalist(s) | 2nd place, silver medalist(s) | | | —N/a | | —N/a | 1st place, gold medalist(s) | —N/a |
| WC 2014 | 5th | 2nd place, silver medalist(s) | 4th | DNS | 2nd place, silver medalist(s) | 3rd place, bronze medalist(s) | 3rd place, bronze medalist(s) | 2nd place, silver medalist(s) | |
| WC 2016 | 2nd place, silver medalist(s) | 2nd place, silver medalist(s) | 2nd place, silver medalist(s) | | 2nd place, silver medalist(s) | 3rd place, bronze medalist(s) | 2nd place, silver medalist(s) | DSQ | 1st place, gold medalist(s) |
| WC 2021 | 7th | 6th | | | 4th^{[a]} | (bronze) ^{[a]} | 1st place, gold medalist(s) | | |

^{a} Shields swam only in the preliminary heats.

== Personal best times ==
As of November 6, 2021

Long Course Meters
| Event | Time | Meet | Location | Date | Notes |
|---|---|---|---|---|---|
| 100 m freestyle | 49.41 | 2015 FINA Swimming World Cup | Chartres, France | August 15, 2015 | |
| 50 m butterfly | 23.56 | 2020 US Olympic Trials | Omaha, Nebraska | June 18, 2021 | † |
| 100 m butterfly | 51.03 | 2015 World Aquatics Championships | Kazan, Russia | August 7, 2015 | |
| 200 m butterfly | 1:55.09 | 2014 US National Championships | Irvine, California | August 6, 2014 | |

Legend: † – time achieved en route to final mark

Short Course Meters
| Event | Time | Meet | Location | Date | Notes |
|---|---|---|---|---|---|
| 50 m freestyle | 21.55 | 2021 International Swimming League | Naples | September 9, 2021 | |
| 100 m freestyle | 46.58 | 2017 FINA Swimming World Cup | Berlin | August 6, 2017 | |
| 50 m butterfly | 21.99 | 2021 FINA Swimming World Cup | Budapest | October 9, 2021 | NR |
| 100 m butterfly | 48.47 | 2020 International Swimming League | Budapest | November 21, 2020 | |
| 200 m butterfly | 1:48.66 | 2020 International Swimming League | Budapest | November 22, 2020 | NR |
| 50 m backstroke | 23.60 | 2020 International Swimming League | Budapest | October 25, 2020 | |
| 100 m backstroke | 50.15 | 2013 FINA Swimming World Cup | Dubai | October 17, 2013 | |
| 200 m backstroke | 1:51.88 | 2014 FINA Swimming World Cup | Hong Kong | October 17, 2013 | |
| 100 m individual medley | 52.14 | 2014 FINA Swimming World Cup | Dubai | August 31, 2014 | |

Legend: NR – American record

Short Course Yards
| Event | Time | Meet | Location | Date | Notes |
|---|---|---|---|---|---|
| 100 yard butterfly | 43.84 | 2016 Short Course National Championships | Atlanta, Georgia | December 2, 2016 | Former NR, US |
| 200 yard butterfly | 1:38.80 | UC San Diego Invitational | San Diego, California | February 7, 2020 | |
| 100 yard backstroke | 44.86 | 2012 NCAA Division 1 Men's Swimming Championships | Federal Way, Washington | March 22, 2012 | |
| 200 yard freestyle | 1:32.75 | 2011 NCAA Division 1 Men's Swimming Championships | Minneapolis, Minnesota | March 24, 2011 | r |

Legend: e – equalled existing record; NR – American record; US – US Open record;
Records not set in finals: h – heat; sf – semifinal; r – relay 1st leg; rh – relay heat 1st leg; b – B final; † – en route to final mark; so – swim-off; tt – time trial

== Swimming World Cup circuits ==
The following medals Shields has won at Swimming World Cup circuits.

| Edition | Gold medals | Silver medals | Bronze medals | Total |
|---|---|---|---|---|
| 2012 | 4 | 0 | 7 | 11 |
| 2013 | 4 | 8 | 4 | 16 |
| 2014 | 6 | 13 | 3 | 22 |
| 2015 | 1 | 3 | 1 | 5 |
| 2017 | 1 | 8 | 7 | 16 |
| 2021 | 10 | 3 | 1 | 14 |
| Total | 26 | 35 | 23 | 84 |

== Continental and national records ==
=== Short course meters (25 m pool) ===
| No. | Event | Time | | Meet | Location | Date | Age | Type | Status | Ref |
|---|---|---|---|---|---|---|---|---|---|---|
| 1 | 50 m butterfly | 22.46 | | 2012 Short Course World Championships | Istanbul, Turkey | December 15, 2012 | 21 | NR | Former | |
| 2 | 200 m butterfly | 1:51.38 | | 2013 FINA Swimming World Cup | Eindhoven, Netherlands | August 7, 2013 | 22 | NR | Former | |
| 3 | 200 m butterfly (2) | 1:51.31 | | 2013 FINA Swimming World Cup | Berlin, Germany | August 10, 2013 | 22 | NR | Former | |
| 4 | 100 m butterfly | 49.01 | | 2013 FINA Swimming World Cup | Berlin, Germany | August 11, 2013 | 22 | AM, NR | Former | |
| 5 | 100 m butterfly (2) | 48.80 | | 2013 FINA Swimming World Cup | Doha, Qatar | October 21, 2013 | 22 | AM, NR | Former | |
| 6 | 200 m butterfly (3) | 1:50.61 | | 2013 Duel in the Pool | Glasgow, Scotland | December 21, 2013 | 22 | NR | Former | |
| 7 | 200 m butterfly (4) | 1:50.08 | | 2014 FINA Swimming World Cup | Doha, Qatar | August 27, 2014 | 23 | NR | Former | |
| 8 | 50 m butterfly (2) | 22.56 | † | 2015 Duel in the Pool | Indianapolis, Indiana | December 11, 2015 | 24 | US | Former | |
| 9 | 100 m butterfly (3) | 48.63 | | 2015 Duel in the Pool | Indianapolis, Indiana | December 11, 2015 | 24 | AM, NR, US | Current US | |
| 10 | 200 m butterfly (5) | 1:49.05 | | 2015 Duel in the Pool | Indianapolis, Indiana | December 12, 2015 | 24 | AM, NR, US | Former | |
| 11 | 200 m butterfly (6) | 1:49.02 | sf | 2020 International Swimming League | Budapest, Hungary | November 16, 2020 | 29 | AM, NR | Former | |
| 12 | 200 m butterfly (7) | 1:48.66 | | 2020 International Swimming League | Budapest, Hungary | November 22, 2020 | 29 | AM, NR | Current | |
| 13 | 50 m butterfly (3) | 21.99 | | 2021 FINA Swimming World Cup | Budapest, Hungary | October 9, 2021 | 30 | NR | Current | |
| 14 | 4×50 m medley | 1:30.51 | | 2021 Short Course World Championships | Abu Dhabi, United Arab Emirates | December 20, 2021 | 30 | AM, NR | Current | |

Legend: AM – Americas record; e – equalled existing record; NR – American record; US – US Open record;
Records not set in finals: h – heat; sf – semifinal; r – relay 1st leg; rh – relay heat 1st leg; b – B final; † – en route to final mark; so – swim-off; tt – time trial

=== Shorts course yards (25 yd pool) ===
| No. | Event | Time | | Meet | Location | Date | Age | Type | Status | Ref |
|---|---|---|---|---|---|---|---|---|---|---|
| 1 | 200 yd butterfly | 1:39.65 | = | 2013 NCAA Division I Championships | Indianapolis, Indiana | March 30, 2013 | 21 | NR | Former | |
| 2 | 100 yd butterfly | 43.84 | | 2016 Short Course National Championships | Atlanta, Georgia | December 2, 2016 | 25 | NR, US | Former | |

Legend: e – equalled existing record; NR – American record; US – US Open record;
Records not set in finals: h – heat; sf – semifinal; r – relay 1st leg; rh – relay heat 1st leg; b – B final; † – en route to final mark; so – swim-off; tt – time trial

== Awards and honors ==
- FINA, Top 10 Moments: 2021 Swimming World Cup (#8)
- Swimming World, The Week That Was: October 11, 2021 (#1), November 1, 2021 (#2)
- SwimSwam, Ultra Swimmer of the Month: October 2021
- SwimSwam, Top 100 (Men's): 2022 (#88)
- Golden Goggle Award nominee, Perseverance Award: 2021
- International Swimming League, Most Valuable Player of Match: Match 5 in 2020
- Pac-12 Conference, Swimmer of the Year: 2012
- Pac-12 Conference, Freshman/Newcomer of the Year: 2010

== See also ==
- List of World Swimming Championships (25 m) medalists (men)
- California Golden Bears
- List of University of California, Berkeley alumni
