= Kevin Steel =

American swimmer

Personal information
- Full name: Kevin Thomas Steel
- Nickname: Kev Thom Ste
- National team: United States
- Born: 14 August 1991 (age 34) Moorestown, New Jersey, U.S.
- Height: 1.90 m (6 ft 3 in)
- Weight: 78 kg (172 lb)

Sport
- Sport: Swimming
- Strokes: Breaststroke
- College team: Arizona Wildcats
- Coach: Eric Hansen

Kevin Thomas Steel (born August 4, 1991) is an American swimmer who specializes in breaststroke events.
