= Kevin Cordes =

American competitive swimmer

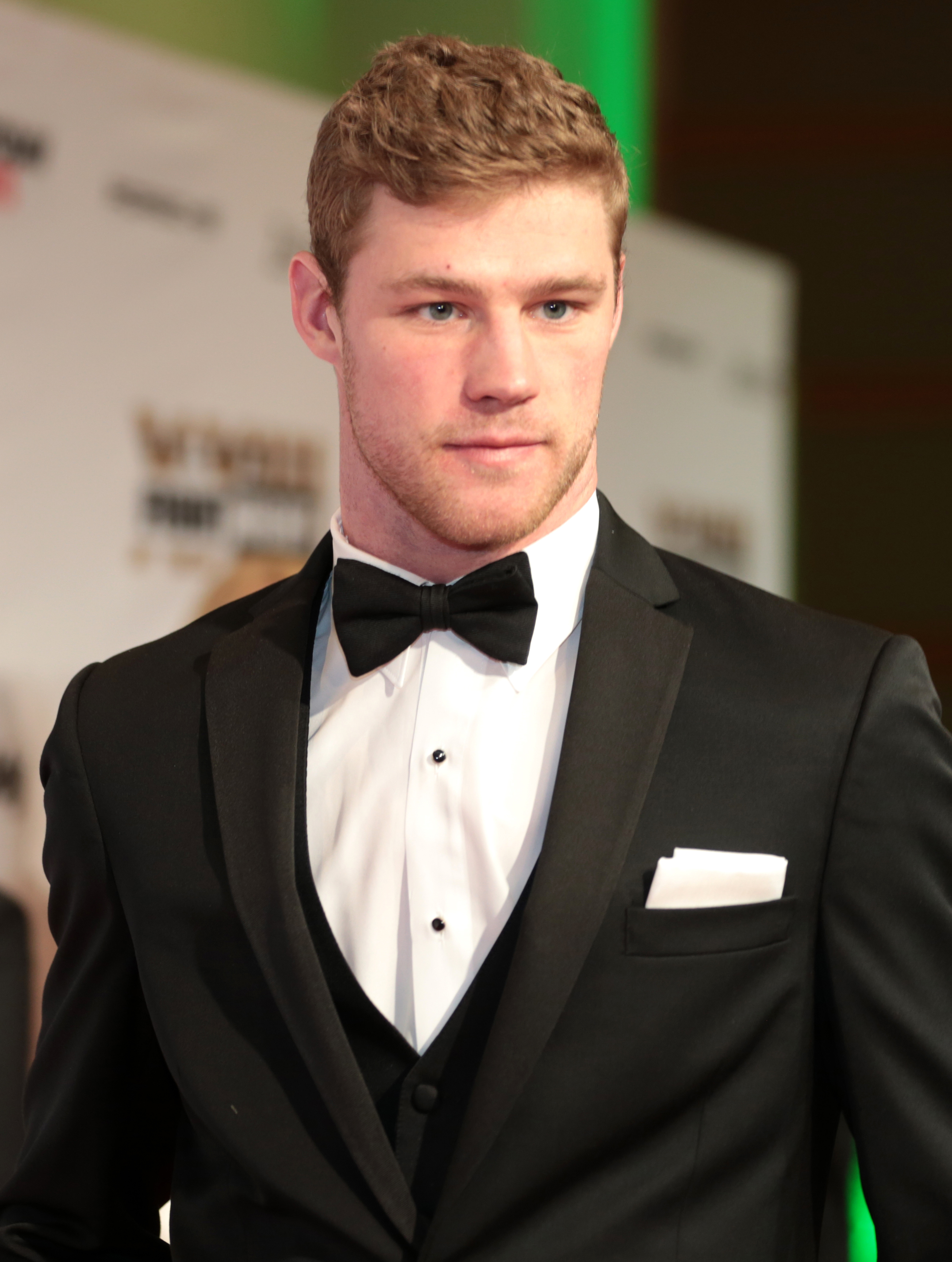
- Cordes in 2017

Personal information
- National team: United States
- Born: August 13, 1993 (age 33) Naperville, Illinois, U.S.
- Height: 6 ft 5 in (196 cm)
- Weight: 194 lb (88 kg)

Sport
- Sport: Swimming
- Strokes: Breaststroke
- Club: Cali Condors
- College team: University of Arizona
Medal record
Men's swimming
Representing the United States
Event	1st	2nd	3rd
Olympic Games	1	0	0
World Championships (LC)	3	3	1
World Championships (SC)	1	0	1
Pan Pacific Championships	1	0	0
Pan American Games	0	0	1
Total	6	3	3
Olympic Games
Gold medal – first place	2016 Rio de Janeiro	4×100 m medley
World Championships (LC)
Gold medal – first place	2015 Kazan	4×100 m medley
Gold medal – first place	2017 Budapest	4×100 m medley
Gold medal – first place	2017 Budapest	4x100 m mixed medley
Silver medal – second place	2015 Kazan	200 m breaststroke
Silver medal – second place	2015 Kazan	4×100 m mixed medley
Silver medal – second place	2017 Budapest	100 m breaststroke
Bronze medal – third place	2015 Kazan	50 m breaststroke
World Championships (SC)
Gold medal – first place	2012 Istanbul	4×100 m medley
Bronze medal – third place	2012 Istanbul	100 m breaststroke
Pan Pacific Championships
Gold medal – first place	2014 Gold Coast	4×100 m medley
Pan American Games
Bronze medal – third place	2019 Lima	100 m breaststroke
Representing the Arizona Wildcats
Event	1st	2nd	3rd
NCAA Championships	8	2	2
Total	8	2	2
By race
Event	1st	2nd	3rd
100 y breaststroke	4	0	0
200 y breaststroke	2	1	1
4×50 y medley	1	0	1
4×100 y medley	1	1	0
Total	8	2	2
NCAA Championships
Gold medal – first place	2012 Federal Way	100 y breaststroke
Gold medal – first place	2012 Federal Way	4×50 y medley
Gold medal – first place	2013 Indianapolis	100 y breaststroke
Gold medal – first place	2013 Indianapolis	200 y breaststroke
Gold medal – first place	2013 Indianapolis	4×100 y medley
Gold medal – first place	2014 Austin	100 y breaststroke
Gold medal – first place	2014 Austin	200 y breaststroke
Gold medal – first place	2015 Iowa City	100 y breaststroke
Silver medal – second place	2012 Federal Way	4×100 y medley
Silver medal – second place	2015 Iowa City	200 y breaststroke
Bronze medal – third place	2012 Federal Way	200 y breaststroke
Bronze medal – third place	2013 Indianapolis	4×50 y medley

Kevin Cordes (/ˈkɒrdɪs/ CORE-dis; born August 13, 1993) is an American competitive swimmer who specializes in breaststroke events. He currently represents the Cali Condors which is part of the International Swimming League. Cordes was a member of the 2016 U.S. Men's Olympic Swimming Team. He won gold in the 4 × 100 m medley relay as a member of the preliminary relay, and took 4th place in the Men's 100m Breaststroke at the 2016 Olympic Games. He is the former American record holder in the 50-meter and 100-meter breaststroke (long course).

== Early life and education ==
Cordes was born in Naperville, Illinois in 1993, the son of Bill and Kristin Cordes. He is a 2011 graduate of Neuqua Valley High School and he graduated from the University of Arizona, where he was majoring in physiology. Swimming for the Arizona Wildcats, he was a six-time NCAA individual national champion, winning the 100-yard breaststroke four years in a row and the 200-yard breaststroke in 2013 and 2014. Cordes was the 2013 and 2014 NCAA Swimmer of the Year.

== Career ==
=== 2012 ===
At the 2012 United States Olympic Trials, Cordes missed qualifying for the Olympic team, finishing third in the 100-meter breaststroke (1:00.58) and twelfth in the 200-meter breaststroke (2:13.26).

At the 2012 FINA Istanbul Short Course World Championships, his first major international competition, Cordes won a team gold medal and an individual bronze medal. The gold medal came his way in the 4 × 100 m medley relay, swimming the breaststroke leg in 57.15 (the fastest in the field). In the 100 m breaststroke, Cordes won a bronze medal with a time of 57.83.

=== 2013 ===
At the 2013 U.S. Summer Nationals, Cordes finished first in the 100- and 200-meter breaststroke, and finished second behind University of Arizona teammate Kevin Steel in the 50-meter breaststroke. Cordes qualified to compete in the individual 50-, 100- and 200-meter breaststroke, and the 4×100-meter medley relay at the 2013 World Aquatics Championships.

At the 2013 World Aquatics Championships, Cordes competed in three individual events and the 4x100-meter medley relay. In his first event, the 100-meter breaststroke, Cordes got a personal best time of 59.78 in the semifinal. In the finals however, he faded away and touched 7th with a time of 1:00.02. In the 50-meter breaststroke, Cordes did not advance past the prelims, posting a time of 27.69 and finishing 21st overall. In his final individual event, the 200-meter breaststroke, Cordes did not advance past the semifinals, finishing with a time of 2:10.03. In the 4x100-meter medley relay, Cordes, as the breaststroke leg, was responsible for disqualifying the United States by diving 0.04 of a second early.

=== 2014 ===
At the 2014 Pan Pacific Swimming Championships, Cordes won gold as a member of the 4x100-meter medley relay with the team finishing with a time of 3:29.94. Swimming the breaststroke leg, Cordes recorded a split of 58.64. In the 100-meter breaststroke, Cordes was disqualified for taking off his goggles midway through the race after they filled with water. In the 200-meter breaststroke, Cordes scratched from the final after posting a time of 2:10.01 in the heats in order to concentrate on the medley relay.

=== 2015 ===
In preparation for the 2016 U.S. Olympic Trials, Cordes moved to Singapore to train with former Bolles swimming head coach, Sergio López.

=== 2016 ===
At the 2016 US Olympic Swimming Trials, Cordes placed first in the 100m breaststroke, qualifying him for the Olympic Team. Subsequently, at the 2016 Summer Olympics, he placed 4th in the 100-meter breaststroke with a time of 59.22, and 8th in the 200-meter breaststroke with a time of 2:08.34.

== Personal bests ==
As of July 31, 2017

Long course
Event	Time	Meet	Date	Note(s)
50 m breaststroke	26.76	2015 World Championships	August 4, 2015	Former AM
100 m breaststroke	58.64	2017 World Championships	July 23, 2017	Former AM
200 m breaststroke	2:07.41	2017 USA Nationals	June 28, 2017	

Short course
Event	Time	Meet	Date	Note(s)
100 m breaststroke	56.88	2013 Duel in the Pool	December 21, 2013	Former AM
200 m breaststroke	2:02.38	2013 Duel in the Pool	December 20, 2013	Former AM

== Personal life ==
Cordes has two siblings, Caroline and Jack. His father Bill played football for the University of Arizona. His sister Caroline played volleyball for the University of Arizona. His brother Jack played basketball for Hillsdale College.

== See also ==
- List of University of Arizona people
- Arizona Wildcats
