= Reed Malone =

American swimmer (born 1995)

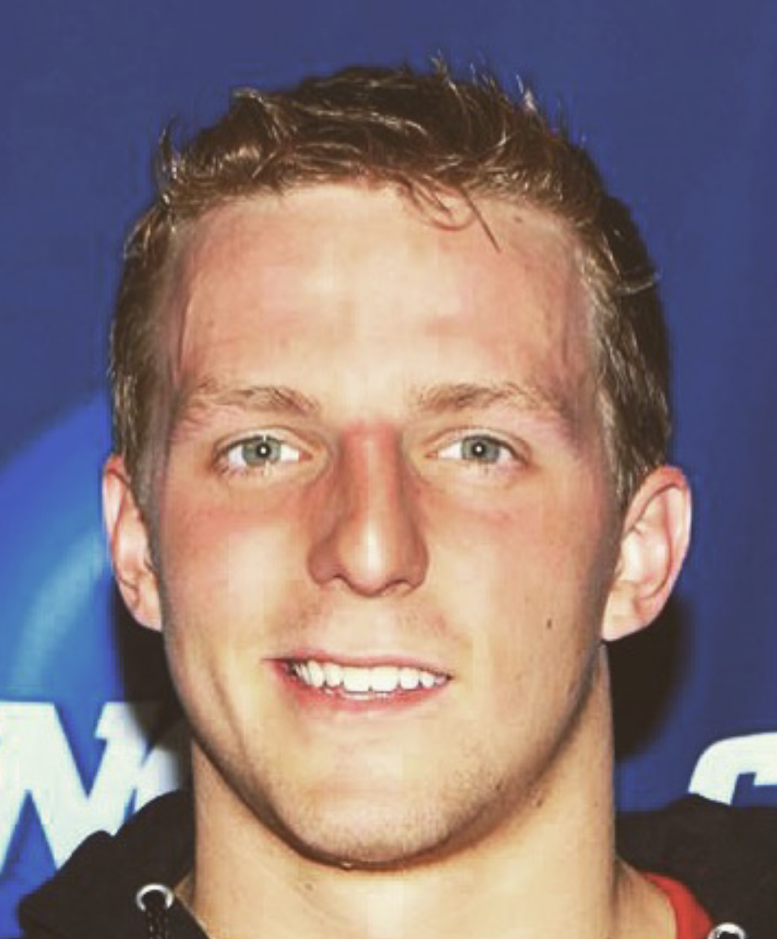

Personal information
- National team: United States
- Born: April 3, 1995 (age 31) Winnetka, Illinois, U.S.
- Height: 6 ft 3 in (1.91 m)
- Weight: 190 lb (86 kg)

Sport
- Sport: Swimming
- Strokes: Freestyle
- Club: Trojan Swim Club
- College team: University of Southern California
- Coach: Dave Salo
Medal record
Men's swimming
Representing the United States
World Championships (LC)
Silver medal – second place	2015 Kazan	4×200 m freestyle
Summer Universiade
Gold medal – first place	2015 Gwangju	200 m freestyle
Gold medal – first place	2015 Gwangju	4×200 m freestyle
Bronze medal – third place	2015 Gwangju	400 m freestyle

Reed Malone (born April 3, 1995) is an American former competition swimmer who competed in freestyle events.

Malone had a successful collegiate career at University of Southern California as a 7-time All-American, 2-time NCAA Champion, and 5-time Pac-12 Champion. Malone was USC's first ever three-time captain and honored as Trojan of the Year in 2017.

Malone first competed internationally at the 2015 Summer Universiade in Gwangju, South Korea. He won gold in the 200m freestyle with a time of 1:47.15, bronze with 3:50.13 in the 400m freestyle, and another gold in the 4 × 200 m freestyle relay. Malone recorded the fastest split in that race with 1:47.06; the final time for the American team was 7:10.82.

At the 2015 World Aquatics Championships in Kazan, Russia, Malone won a silver medal as a newcomer to the U.S. swimming team in the 4 × 200 m freestyle relay. He swam a 1:46.92 split on the third leg for a final time of 7:04.75, behind the British team by 0.4 seconds.

At the 2016 Olympic Trials, Malone finished 10th in the 400 free (3:50.73) and 15th in the 200 free (1:48.85). Malone graduated from USC in 2018 and moved to New York City to work at the Late Show with Stephen Colbert briefly before returning to swimming later that year. He began training again with Wildcat Aquatics at Northwestern University and made his professional debut at the Tyr Pro Swim Series in Des Moines, placing 4th overall in the 400m freestyle (3:53.8) and 10th in the 200m (1:50.44), qualifying for the 2020 Olympic Trials in both events.

In fall 2019, Malone began training with Team Elite Aquatics in San Diego, California in preparation for the 2020 Olympics.

Malone is now in technology sales at software company Watershed.
