= Josh Prenot =

American swimmer (born 1993)

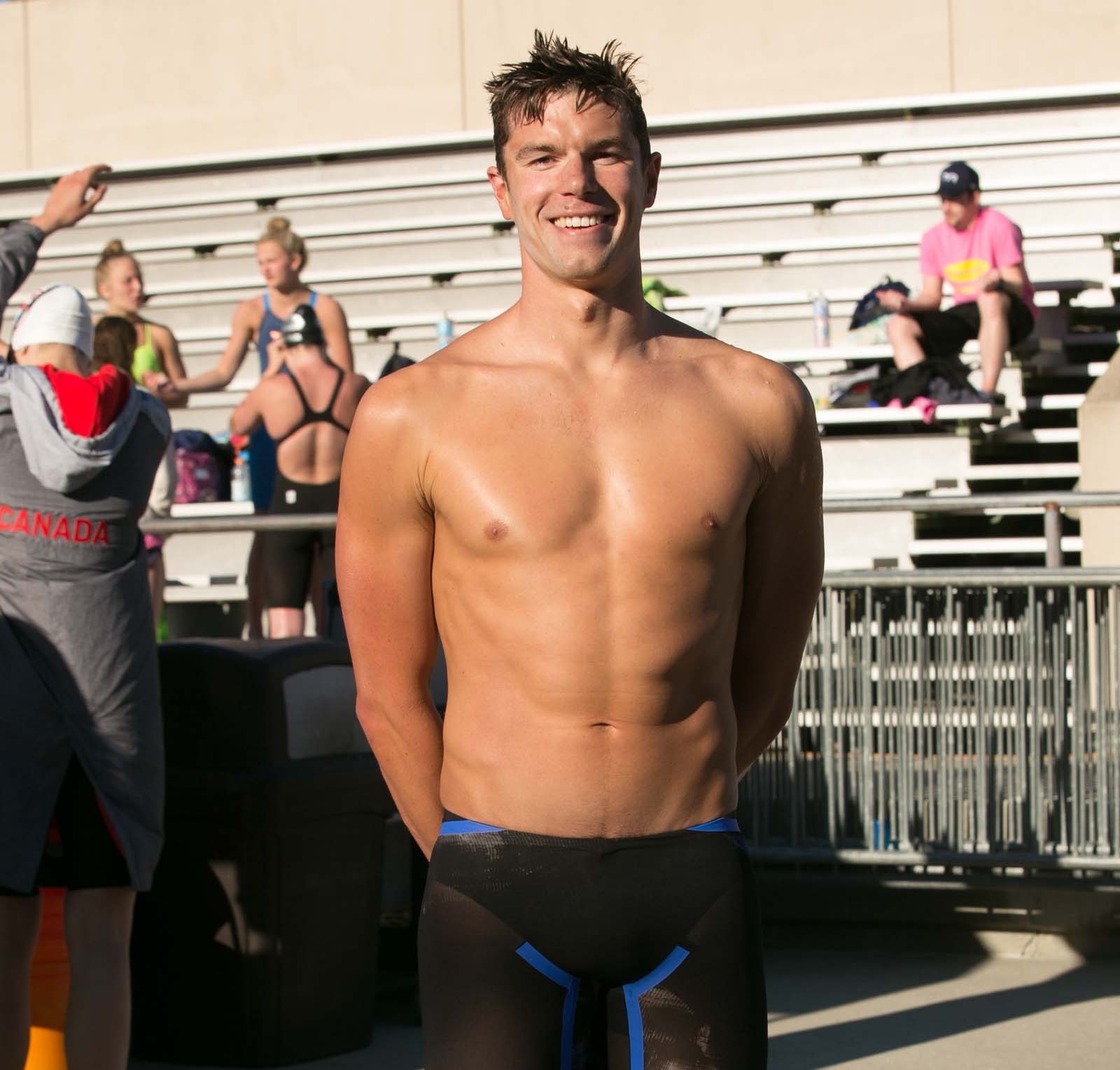

Personal information
- Full name: Joshua Prenot
- Nationality: American
- Born: July 28, 1993 (age 33) Sedalia, Missouri, U.S.
- Height: 5 ft 11 in (180.3 cm)
- Weight: 165 lb (75 kg)
- Spouse: Tiffany Sudarma

Sport
- Sport: Swimming
- Strokes: Breaststroke, individual medley
- Club: Santa Maria Swim Club
- College team: U. California, Berkeley
- Coach: Dave Durden (Berkeley)
Medal record
Men's swimming
Representing the United States
| Event | 1st | 2nd | 3rd |
|---|---|---|---|
| Olympic Games | 0 | 1 | 0 |
| World Championships (SC) | 0 | 1 | 0 |
| Summer Universiade | 2 | 1 | 0 |
| Total | 2 | 3 | 0 |
Olympic Games
| Silver medal – second place | 2016 Rio de Janeiro | 200 m breaststroke |
World Championships (SC)
| Silver medal – second place | 2018 Hangzhou | 200 m medley |
Summer Universiade
| Gold medal – first place | 2015 Gwangju | 200 m breaststroke |
| Gold medal – first place | 2015 Gwangju | 200 m medley |
| Silver medal – second place | 2015 Gwangju | 400 m medley |

Joshua Prenot (born July 28, 1993) is a former American competitive swimmer who competed for the University of California at Berkeley and was a 2016 Rio de Janeiro Olympic silver medalist in the men's 200-meter breaststroke. He specialized in breaststroke and individual medley events.

Prenot was born in Sedalia, Missouri on July 28, 1993 to Bill and Tammy Prenot, and raised in Santa Maria, California, where at 12, he began swimming with the Santa Maria Swim Club.

== Early life and swimming ==
At 14, swimming for the Santa Maria Club in August 2007 at the Long Course Junior Olympics, he swam a 2:25.50 in the in 200 butterfly, a 2:19.63 in the 200 Individual Medley, and a 4:54.60 in the 400 individual medley, winning all three events and leading Santa Maria to a third place team finish. Swimming for the Santa Maria Club in the Central California 2006 Junior Olympics in March in Bakersfield, Prenot received golds in the 500 freestyle and 200 Individual Medley, and received a silver medal in seven other events. In youthful international competition, as a member of the National Junior Team, he had an eighth place finish in the 400 IM at the 2011 Summer Nationals. He captured a fourth place 400 IM finish in the Peru Junior World Championships.

In the summer of 2012, Prenot just missed qualifying in the 200-meter individual medley at the Olympic trails in Omaha, Nebraska, for the 2012 Olympics. At 19, in the Western Zones Swimming Championships in Clovis, New Mexico in early August, 2012 he won the 200 individual medley, the 100 breaststroke, and the 100 butterfly.

== UC Berkeley swimmer ==
Prenot swam for the University of California Berkeley under Head Coach Dave Durden, where in 2012, he began his freshman year. He graduated with a degree in Physics from Berkeley in 2017. At the NCAA Championships in 2014, he captured a third place in the 400 IM with a time of 3:38.58, which set a new Berkeley school record, also placing fifth in the 200 IM. In 2016, Prenot won his first NCAA title at the NCAA Men's Division I Swimming and Diving Championships in the 400 yd IM. In 2016, he held Berkeley's best men's times in the 400 and 200 Individual Medley and the 200 breaststroke events. At Berkeley, Prenot had one of the fastest collegiate times ever recorded in the 200 IM with a 1:41.79 which he set at the PAC-12 Conference Championships in 2012. After finishing his career at Berkeley, he felt pressure to succeed at the 2016 Olympic Trials.

While at Berkeley, Prenot was a member of the US World University Games team in Gwangju in 2015 where he received golds in the 200 m breaststroke, and the 200 m medley. He also received a silver in the 400 m medley at the 2015 World University Games.

== 2016 Olympic silver medal ==
He placed third in the 100 m breaststroke at the US Olympic Swimming Trials. Later in those trials, he set an American record in the 200m breaststroke, also recording the second-fastest performance all-time in the event, winning the final to qualify for the 2016 Summer Olympics.

At the 2016 Summer Olympics, he won the silver medal in the 200m breaststroke in a time of 2:07.53. Dmitry Balandin of Kzakhstan, who won the gold medal in 2:07.46, was not expected to win, and his victory, which was the first medal in swimming for Kzakhstan, was considered an upset. Early favorites in the 200 meter breaststroke in 2016 included 2015 World Champion Marco Koch of Germany who finished seventh, and defending Hungarian Gold medalist in the event Daniel Gyurta who was unable to make the finals. Bronze medal winner Anton Chupkov of Russia who swam a 2:07.70 to finish only .17 behind Prenot, was also an unexpected medalist.

== Post 2016 Olympic swimming ==
In July 2018, Prenot raced the 200m breaststroke at the 2018 Phillips 66 National Championships and World Championship Trials and swam the world's fastest 200m breaststroke time with a 2:07.28. In international competition, Prenot finished fourth at the 2014 Pan Pacifics in the 200 breast. He placed third in the 200 breast and 400 IM at the National Championships in 2014. At the 2018 World Championships in Hangzhou, he captured a silver in the 200 meter medley.

=== 2020 Olympic trials ===
At the 2020 Olympic trials in June 2021 due to COVID, Prenot failed to qualify in the preliminary heats of the 200-meter breaststroke with a 2:13.42, finishing 17th in the trial competition, though beginning with a fourth place seeding. He strongly indicated he would take a long break from competition and very possibly retire after the trials.

== Personal life ==
Prenot married his wife, Tiffany Sudarma, on the island of Bali on March 9, 2019. Tiffany was a former swimmer on the Indonesian National Team and swam in college for Daytona State, the University of Miami, and for her last two years at Southern Methodist University. Olympic team mate Ryan Murphy (swimmer) served as a groomsman, and the newlyweds planned to honeymoon in New Zealand. The couple had one child as of September 2023 and were living in Austin, where Prenot worked for ClickUp, producer of a software product that improved digital productivity.
