= 2014 FINA World Swimming Championships (25 m) – Men's 50 metre backstroke =

Men's 50 metre backstroke at the 2014 FINA World Swimming Championships (25 m)
- Dates: 5 December (heats and semifinals); 6 December (final)
- Competitors: 107 from 81 nations
- Winning time: 22.22

Medalists
gold medal	Florent Manaudou	France
silver medal	Eugene Godsoe	United States
bronze medal	Stanislav Donets	Russia

The Men's 50 metre backstroke competition of the 2014 FINA World Swimming Championships (25 m) was held on 5 December with the heats and the semifinals and 6 December with the final.

== Records ==
Prior to the competition, the existing world and championship records were as follows.

	Name	Nation	Time	Location	Date
World record	Peter Marshall	United States	22.61	Singapore	22 November 2009
Championship record	Stanislav Donets	Russia	22.93	Dubai	18 December 2010

The following records were established during the competition:

Date	Event	Name	Nation	Time	Record
6 December	Final	Florent Manaudou	France	22.22	WR, CR

== Results ==
=== Heats ===
The heats were held 09:38.

Rank	Heat	Lane	Name	Nationality	Time	Notes
1	10	4	Florent Manaudou	France	23.24	Q
2	11	6	Stanislav Donets	Russia	23.29	Q
3	8	4	Matt Grevers	United States	23.32	Q
4	11	4	Eugene Godsoe	United States	23.37	Q
5	10	3	Chris Walker-Hebborn	Great Britain	23.44	Q
6	11	5	Benjamin Stasiulis	France	23.48	Q
7	11	2	Lavrans Solli	Norway	23.50	Q
8	10	5	Guilherme Guido	Brazil	23.55	Q
9	11	3	Niccolo Bonacchi	Italy	23.60	Q
10	9	4	Mitch Larkin	Australia	23.69	Q
11	9	3	Christian Diener	Germany	23.70	Q
12	7	2	Albert Subirats	Venezuela	23.71	Q
13	10	9	Ryosuke Irie	Japan	23.75	Q
14	10	6	Sun Xiaolei	China	23.77	Q
15	9	5	Guy Barnea	Israel	23.87	Q
16	9	7	Henrique Martins	Brazil	23.90	Q
17	9	2	Russell Wood	Canada	23.93	
18	11	0	Daniel Carranza	Mexico	23.97	
19	6	4	Omar Pinzón	Colombia	23.98	NR
20	9	1	Simone Sabbioni	Italy	23.99	
20	11	1	Yuki Shirai	Japan	23.99	
22	9	0	Apostolos Christou	Greece	24.06	
23	11	7	David Gamburg	Israel	24.11	
24	10	7	Viktar Staselovich	Belarus	24.15	
25	7	9	Antons Voitovs	Latvia	24.23	
26	11	9	Dávid Földházi	Hungary	24.25	
27	10	2	Alexandr Tarabrin	Kazakhstan	24.26	
28	6	2	Rexford Tullius	United States Virgin Islands	24.27	
29	9	6	Alexis Santos	Portugal	24.29	
29	10	1	Ryan Pini	Papua New Guinea	24.29	
31	9	8	Robert Glinţă	Romania	24.34	
32	11	8	Ricky Ellis	South Africa	24.45	
33	10	0	Gábor Balog	Hungary	24.49	
34	8	6	Lin Yongqing	China	24.61	
35	7	3	Charl Crous	South Africa	24.63	
36	10	8	Jānis Šaltāns	Latvia	24.75	
37	8	8	Martin Baďura	Czech Republic	24.82	
38	8	1	Lukas Rauftlin	Switzerland	24.84	
39	8	3	Lau Shiu Yue	Hong Kong	24.86	
40	7	5	Martin Zhelev	Bulgaria	24.91	
41	8	0	Wang Yu-lian	Chinese Taipei	25.02	
42	6	3	Armando Barrera	Cuba	25.04	
43	8	7	Saša Gerbec	Croatia	25.08	
44	8	5	Charles Hockin	Paraguay	25.28	
45	6	8	Boris Kirillov	Azerbaijan	25.36	
36	8	2	Ryad Djendouci	Algeria	25.39	
47	7	7	Jamal Chavoshifar	Iran	25.40	
48	8	9	Kristinn Þórarinsson	Iceland	25.41	
49	9	9	Ng Kai Hong Henry	Hong Kong	25.46	
50	5	4	Matthew Abeysinghe	Sri Lanka	25.57	
51	7	6	Daniil Bukin	Uzbekistan	25.73	
52	6	5	Merdan Ataýew	Turkmenistan	25.80	
53	6	1	David van der Colff	Botswana	25.99	
54	7	8	Soroush Ghandchi	Iran	26.05	
55	7	4	Kolbeinn Hrafnkelsson	Iceland	26.10	
56	7	1	Gabriel Melconian	Uruguay	26.39	
57	5	1	Peter Wetzlar	Zimbabwe	26.47	
58	6	6	Chad Idensohn	Zimbabwe	26.52	
59	5	5	Grigorii Kalminskii	Azerbaijan	26.53	
60	6	9	Gorazd Chepishevski	Macedonia	26.56	
61	6	0	Driss Lahrichi	Morocco	26.57	
62	5	3	Neil Muscat	Malta	26.60	
63	5	8	Rodrigo Suriano	El Salvador	26.70	
64	4	2	Axel Ngui	Philippines	26.77	
65	3	4	Winter Heaven	Samoa	26.95	
66	6	7	Hamdan Bayusuf	Kenya	27.00	
67	4	5	Patrick Groters	Aruba	27.08	
68	5	2	Yum Cheng Man	Macau	27.23	
69	5	6	Yaaqoub Al-Saadi	United Arab Emirates	27.30	
70	4	3	Igor Mogne	Mozambique	27.40	
71	5	7	Maroun Waked	Lebanon	27.51	
72	5	9	Jeremy Kostons	Curaçao	27.65	
73	4	9	Noah Mascoll-Gomes	Antigua and Barbuda	27.87	
74	4	6	Faraj Saleh	Bahrain	27.89	
75	3	3	Mohammad Abdo	Palestine	28.06	
76	5	0	Aram Kostanyan	Armenia	28.15	
77	7	0	Jevon Atkinson	Jamaica	28.23	
78	4	4	Jordan Gonzalez	Gibraltar	28.31	
79	4	1	Nathan Nades	Papua New Guinea	28.36	
80	4	0	Rony Bakale	Republic of the Congo	28.46	
81	4	7	Noah Al-Khulaifi	Qatar	28.73	
82	4	8	Matar Samb	Senegal	29.29	
83	3	2	Andrew Hopkin	Grenada	29.33	
84	3	7	Arnold Kisulo	Uganda	29.56	
85	3	8	Dean Hoffman	Seychelles	29.67	
86	3	1	Nikolas Sylvester	Saint Vincent and the Grenadines	29.93	
87	3	6	Kgosietsile Molefinyane	Botswana	29.97	
88	3	0	Emil Rahmatulin	Turkmenistan	30.09	
89	2	5	Aliasger Karimjee	Tanzania	30.25	
90	2	6	Giordan Harris	Marshall Islands	30.27	
91	2	2	Tongli Panuve	Tonga	30.49	
92	1	4	Thol Thoeun	Cambodia	30.57	
93	3	5	J'Air Smith	Antigua and Barbuda	30.67	
94	2	1	Adam Moncherry	Seychelles	30.83	
95	2	4	Aleksander Ngresi	Albania	31.05	
96	2	3	Temaruata Strickland	Cook Islands	31.22	
97	3	9	Storm Hablich	Saint Vincent and the Grenadines	31.59	
98	2	9	Htut Ahnt Khaung	Myanmar	31.97	
99	1	7	Justine Rodriguez	Federated States of Micronesia	32.00	
100	1	8	Tommy Imazu	Guam	32.59	
101	1	1	Tanner Poppe	Guam	33.47	
102	1	5	Miraj Prajapati	Nepal	33.57	
103	1	6	Ebrahim Al-Maleki	Yemen	33.61	
104	1	2	Sami Al-Sayaghi	Yemen	36.07	
105	1	3	Awoussou Ablam	Benin	37.38	
105	2	0	Idriss Mutankabandi	Burundi	37.38	
107	2	8	Billy-Scott Irakoze	Burundi	37.91	
—	1	0	Mazabalo Awizoba	Togo		DNS
—	2	7	Umarkhon Alizoda	Tajikistan		DNS

=== Semifinals ===
The semifinals were held 18:05.

==== Semifinal 1 ====
Rank	Lane	Name	Nationality	Time	Notes
1	7	Albert Subirats	Venezuela	23.17	Q, SA
2	5	Eugene Godsoe	United States	23.19	Q
3	2	Mitch Larkin	Australia	23.33	Q
4	4	Stanislav Donets	Russia	23.41	Q
5	6	Guilherme Guido	Brazil	23.42	
6	3	Benjamin Stasiulis	France	23.47	
7	1	Sun Xiaolei	China	23.62	
8	8	Henrique Martins	Brazil	23.93	

==== Semifinal 2 ====
Rank	Lane	Name	Nationality	Time	Notes
1	4	Florent Manaudou	France	22.97	Q
2	5	Matt Grevers	United States	23.27	Q
3	6	Lavrans Solli	Norway	23.33	Q
4	3	Chris Walker-Hebborn	Great Britain	23.34	Q
5	2	Niccolo Bonacchi	Italy	23.48	
6	8	Guy Barnea	Israel	23.49	
7	7	Christian Diener	Germany	23.51	
8	1	Ryosuke Irie	Japan	23.63	

=== Final ===
The final were held 18:11.

Rank	Lane	Name	Nationality	Time	Notes
1st place, gold medalist(s)	4	Florent Manaudou	France	22.22	WR
2nd place, silver medalist(s)	3	Eugene Godsoe	United States	23.05	
3rd place, bronze medalist(s)	8	Stanislav Donets	Russia	23.10	
4	5	Albert Subirats	Venezuela	23.16	SA
5	2	Mitch Larkin	Australia	23.18	
6	6	Matt Grevers	United States	23.32	
7	1	Chris Walker-Hebborn	Great Britain	23.33	
8	7	Lavrans Solli	Norway	23.48	
