= 2014 FINA World Swimming Championships (25 m) – Men's 100 metre backstroke =

Men's 100 metre backstroke at the 2014 FINA World Swimming Championships (25 m)
- Dates: 3 December (heats and semifinals); 4 December (final)
- Competitors: 89 from 70 nations
- Winning time: 49.57

Medalists
gold medal	Mitch Larkin	Australia
silver medal	Radosław Kawęcki	Poland
bronze medal	Ryosuke Irie	Japan
bronze medal	Matt Grevers	United States

The Men's 100 metre backstroke competition of the 2014 FINA World Swimming Championships (25 m) was held on 3 December with the heats and the semifinals and 4 December with the final.

== Records ==
Prior to the competition, the existing world and championship records were as follows.

	Name	Nation	Time	Location	Date
World record	Nick Thoman	United States	48.94	Manchester	18 December 2009
Championship record	Stanislav Donets	Russia	48.95	Dubai	19 December 2010

== Results ==
=== Heats ===
The heats were held at 10:20.

Rank	Heat	Lane	Name	Nationality	Time	Notes
1	7	1	Matt Grevers	United States	50.19	Q
2	9	4	Mitch Larkin	Australia	50.54	Q
3	8	6	David Gamburg	Israel	50.64	Q
4	9	5	Benjamin Stasiulis	France	50.66	Q
5	8	3	Ryosuke Irie	Japan	50.72	Q
6	7	4	Christian Diener	Germany	50.75	Q
7	8	4	Eugene Godsoe	United States	50.79	Q
8	7	5	Chris Walker-Hebborn	Great Britain	50.81	Q
9	7	6	Stanislav Donets	Russia	50.99	Q
9	9	7	Radosław Kawęcki	Poland	50.99	Q
11	9	3	Guilherme Guido	Brazil	51.05	Q
12	8	5	Yuki Shirai	Japan	51.06	Q
13	8	8	Lavrans Solli	Norway	51.33	Q
14	7	2	Danas Rapšys	Lithuania	51.35	Q
14	9	6	Guy Barnea	Israel	51.35	Q
16	8	2	Russell Wood	Canada	51.36	Q
17	8	9	Omar Pinzón	Colombia	51.45	NR
18	7	7	Simone Sabbioni	Italy	51.56	
19	9	2	Niccolo Bonacchi	Italy	51.65	
20	7	3	Alexandr Tarabrin	Kazakhstan	51.92	
21	7	8	Ryan Pini	Papua New Guinea	51.93	
22	5	9	Robert Glință	Romania	51.99	
23	9	8	Lucas Salatta	Brazil	52.08	
24	8	0	Apostolos Christou	Greece	52.17	
25	8	1	Gábor Balog	Hungary	52.30	
26	4	2	Rexford Tullius	United States Virgin Islands	52.33	
27	9	1	Péter Bernek	Hungary	52.82	
28	9	9	Martin Baďura	Czech Republic	52.90	
29	6	5	Viktar Staselovich	Belarus	52.97	
30	6	6	Charl Crous	South Africa	53.03	
31	7	0	Lukas Rauftlin	Switzerland	53.08	
32	8	7	Alexis Santos	Portugal	53.17	
33	6	1	Antons Voitovs	Latvia	53.29	
34	6	4	Sun Xiaolei	China	53.41	
35	9	0	Janis Šaltāns	Latvia	53.43	
36	6	2	Martin Zhelev	Bulgaria	53.73	
37	6	8	Raphaël Stacchiotti	Luxembourg	53.79	
38	7	9	Stephanus Coetzer	South Africa	53.88	
39	5	4	Davíð Aðalsteinsson	Iceland	54.04	
40	6	9	Semen Makovich	Russia	54.09	
41	6	7	Charles Hockin	Paraguay	54.14	
42	6	3	Marko Krce-Rabar	Croatia	54.25	
43	5	2	Andres Montoya	Colombia	54.33	
44	5	0	Armando Barrera	Cuba	54.41	
45	6	0	Kristinn Þórarinsson	Iceland	54.68	
46	5	5	Lau Shiu Yue	Hong Kong	54.86	
47	4	1	Boris Kirillov	Azerbaijan	54.92	
48	4	5	Jamal Chavoshifar	Iran	55.03	
49	5	1	Roman Dmytrijev	Czech Republic	55.23	
50	4	6	David van der Cloff	Botswana	55.37	
51	5	7	Daniil Bukin	Uzbekistan	55.46	
52	5	6	Ryad Djendouci	Algeria	55.50	
53	5	8	Matías López	Paraguay	55.56	
54	3	3	Matthew Abeysinghe	Sri Lanka	56.05	
55	4	4	Lin Shih-chieh	Chinese Taipei	56.28	
56	3	1	Grigorii Kalminskii	Azerbaijan	56.36	
57	5	3	Ng Kai Hong Henry	Hong Kong	56.41	
58	4	8	Gorazd Chepishevski	Macedonia	56.70	
59	4	3	Merdan Ataýew	Turkmenistan	56.82	
60	4	0	Driss Lahrichi	Morocco	57.31	
61	3	2	Peter Wetzlar	Zimbabwe	57.33	
62	3	4	Rodrigo Suriano	El Salvador	57.34	
63	4	7	Soroush Ghandchi	Iran	57.46	
64	3	5	Neil Muscat	Malta	57.55	
65	4	9	Hamdan Bayusuf	Kenya	58.01	
66	3	8	Yaaqoub Al-Saadi	United Arab Emirates	58.23	
67	3	6	Aram Kostanyan	Armenia	58.65	
68	3	9	Igor Mogne	Mozambique	58.69	
69	3	0	Patrick Groters	Aruba	58.78	
70	3	7	Maroun Waked	Lebanon	59.17	
71	2	4	Yum Cheng Man	Macau	59.81	
72	2	6	Andrea Barberini	San Marino	59.93	
73	2	5	Jeremy Kostons	Curaçao	1:00.10	
74	2	2	Jordan Gonzalez	Gibraltar	1:00.60	
75	2	3	Noah Al-Khulaifi	Qatar	1:01.34	
76	2	7	Rony Bakale	Republic of the Congo	1:02.64	
77	2	1	Nathan Nades	Papua New Guinea	1:02.94	
78	1	3	Aliasger Karimjee	Tanzania	1:04.78	
79	2	0	J'Air Smith	Antigua and Barbuda	1:05.22	
80	2	8	Arnold Kisulo	Uganda	1:05.70	
81	1	5	Temaruata Strickland	Cook Islands	1:05.74	
82	1	4	Dean Hoffman	Seychelles	1:06.51	
83	2	9	Aleksander Ngresi	Albania	1:08.85	
84	1	2	Ahnt Khaung Htut	Myanmar	1:09.07	
85	1	7	Storm Hablich	Saint Vincent and the Grenadines	1:10.02	
86	1	8	Phathana Inthavong	Laos	1:10.52	
87	1	1	Tommy Imazu	Guam	1:12.30	
88	1	6	Dionisio Augustine	Federated States of Micronesia	1:12.93	
89	1	0	Tanner Poppe	Guam	1:15.96	

=== Semifinals ===
The semifinals were held at 18:14.

==== Semifinal 1 ====
Rank	Lane	Name	Nationality	Time	Notes
1	4	Mitch Larkin	Australia	49.62	Q
2	3	Christian Diener	Germany	50.32	Q
3	2	Radosław Kawęcki	Poland	50.54	Q
4	5	Benjamin Stasiulis	France	50.68	Q
5	6	Chris Walker-Hebborn	Great Britain	50.76	
6	7	Yuki Shirai	Japan	50.85	
7	1	Danas Rapšys	Lithuania	50.95	
8	8	Russell Wood	Canada	51.59	

==== Semifinal 2 ====
Rank	Lane	Name	Nationality	Time	Notes
1	7	Guilherme Guido	Brazil	50.12	Q
2	3	Ryosuke Irie	Japan	50.16	Q
3	4	Matt Grevers	United States	50.26	Q
4	6	Eugene Godsoe	United States	50.42	Q
5	2	Stanislav Donets	Russia	50.69	
6	5	David Gamburg	Israel	50.78	
7	1	Lavrans Solli	Norway	51.33	
8	8	Guy Barnea	Israel	51.64	

=== Final ===
The final was held at 18:34.

Rank	Lane	Name	Nationality	Time	Notes
1st place, gold medalist(s)	4	Mitch Larkin	Australia	49.57	
2nd place, silver medalist(s)	1	Radosław Kawęcki	Poland	50.11	
3rd place, bronze medalist(s)	3	Ryosuke Irie	Japan	50.12	
3rd place, bronze medalist(s)	6	Matt Grevers	United States	50.12	
5	2	Christian Diener	Germany	50.21	
5	5	Guilherme Guido	Brazil	50.21	
7	7	Eugene Godsoe	United States	50.40	
8	8	Benjamin Stasiulis	France	50.86	
