= Swimming at the 2014 European Aquatics Championships – Men's 50 metre backstroke =

Men's 50 metre backstroke at the Swimming at the 2014 European Aquatics Championships
- Dates: 20–21 August
- Competitors: 40 from 25 nations
- Winning time: 24.64

Medalists
gold medal	Vladimir Morozov	Russia
silver medal	Jérémy Stravius	France
bronze medal	Chris Walker-Hebborn	Great Britain

The Men's 50 metre backstroke competition of the 2014 European Aquatics Championships was held on 20–21 August.

== Records ==
Prior to the competition, the existing world, European and championship records were as follows.

	Name	Nation	Time	Location	Date
World record	Liam Tancock	Great Britain	24.04	Rome	2 August 2009
European record	Liam Tancock	Great Britain	24.04	Rome	2 August 2009
Championship record	Camille Lacourt	France	24.07	Budapest	12 August 2010

== Results ==
=== Heats ===
The heats were held at 10:30.

Rank	Heat	Lane	Name	Nationality	Time	Notes
1	5	5	Guy Barnea	Israel	24.99	Q
1	4	4	Vladimir Morozov	Russia	24.99	Q
3	5	4	Jérémy Stravius	France	25.04	Q
4	4	6	Nicolas Grässer	Germany	25.15	Q
5	4	5	Nikita Ulyanov	Russia	25.22	Q
6	3	5	Sergey Fesikov	Russia	25.28	
7	5	3	Chris Walker-Hebborn	Great Britain	25.29	Q
8	4	3	Stefano Pizzamiglio	Italy	25.30	Q
8	3	4	Niccolò Bonacchi	Italy	25.30	Q
10	3	6	Juan Miguel Rando	Spain	25.33	Q
11	4	2	Jesse Puts	Netherlands	25.44	Q
12	5	6	Jonatan Kopelev	Israel	25.45	Q
13	4	7	Miguel Ortiz-Cañavate	Spain	25.55	Q
14	5	7	Pavel Sankovich	Belarus	25.57	Q
15	3	3	Bastiaan Lijesen	Netherlands	25.65	Q
15	5	2	Lavrans Solli	Norway	25.65	Q
17	3	2	Viktar Staselovich	Belarus	25.69	Q
18	4	0	David Gamburg	Israel	26.05	
18	2	4	Andrey Shabasov	Russia	26.05	
20	3	7	Yakov Toumarkin	Israel	26.07	
21	5	1	Baslakov İskender	Turkey	26.11	
22	5	8	Pedro Oliveira	Portugal	26.15	
23	2	5	Daniel Macovei	Romania	26.30	
24	3	8	Antons Voitovs	Latvia	26.32	
25	3	1	Eric Ress	France	26.33	
26	3	0	Axel Pettersson	Sweden	26.34	
27	4	9	Martin Zhelev	Bulgaria	26.37	
28	5	9	Gytis Stankevičius	Lithuania	26.47	
29	2	6	Teo Kolonić	Croatia	26.56	
30	3	9	Martin Baďura	Czech Republic	26.57	
31	2	3	Martin Verner	Czech Republic	26.59	
32	2	7	David Kunčar	Czech Republic	26.68	
33	2	1	Boris Kirillov	Azerbaijan	26.69	
34	5	0	Doruk Tekin	Turkey	26.74	
35	2	0	Jean-François Schneiders	Luxembourg	26.76	
36	2	8	Marko Krce-Rabar	Croatia	26.82	
36	2	9	Petar Petrović	Serbia	26.82	
36	2	2	Sergiy Varvaruk	Ukraine	26.82	
39	1	4	Elijah Stolz	Switzerland	27.51	
40	1	3	Aram Kostanyan	Armenia	28.41	
—	1	5	Ari-Pekka Liukkonen	Finland		DNS
—	4	1	Alexis Santos	Portugal		DNS
—	4	8	Benjamin Stasiulis	France		DNS

=== Semifinals ===
The semifinals were held at 19:43.

==== Semifinal 1 ====
Rank	Lane	Name	Nationality	Time	Notes
1	4	Vladimir Morozov	Russia	24.61	Q
2	3	Chris Walker-Hebborn	Great Britain	25.05	Q
3	2	Jesse Puts	Netherlands	25.07	Q
4	5	Nicolas Grässer	Germany	25.11	Q
5	8	Viktar Staselovich	Belarus	25.41	
6	6	Niccolò Bonacchi	Italy	25.47	
7	1	Bastiaan Lijesen	Netherlands	25.51	
8	7	Miguel Ortiz-Cañavate	Spain	25.60	

==== Semifinal 2 ====
Rank	Lane	Name	Nationality	Time	Notes
1	4	Guy Barnea	Israel	24.99	Q
2	8	Lavrans Solli	Norway	25.14	Q
3	5	Jérémy Stravius	France	25.21	Q
4	1	Pavel Sankovich	Belarus	25.23	Q
5	3	Nikita Ulyanov	Russia	25.24	
6	6	Stefano Pizzamiglio	Italy	25.27	
7	7	Jonatan Kopelev	Israel	25.37	
8	2	Juan Miguel Rando	Spain	25.40	

=== Final ===
The final was held at 19:24.

Rank	Lane	Name	Nationality	Time	Notes
1st place, gold medalist(s)	4	Vladimir Morozov	Russia	24.64	
2nd place, silver medalist(s)	1	Jérémy Stravius	France	24.84	
3rd place, bronze medalist(s)	3	Chris Walker-Hebborn	Great Britain	25.00	
4	2	Nicolas Grässer	Germany	25.02	
5	5	Guy Barnea	Israel	25.05	
6	8	Pavel Sankovich	Belarus	25.11	
7	7	Lavrans Solli	Norway	25.28	
8	6	Jesse Puts	Netherlands	25.56	
