= Swimming at the 2014 European Aquatics Championships – Men's 100 metre backstroke =

Men's 100 metre backstroke at the Swimming at the 2014 European Aquatics Championships
- Dates: 18–19 August
- Competitors: 42 from 25 nations
- Winning time: 53.32

Medalists
gold medal	Chris Walker-Hebborn	Great Britain
silver medal	Jérémy Stravius	France
bronze medal	Jan-Philip Glania	Germany

The Men's 100 metre backstroke competition of the 2014 European Aquatics Championships was held on 18–19 August.

== Records ==
Prior to the competition, the existing world, European and championship records were as follows.

	Name	Nation	Time	Location	Date
World record	Aaron Peirsol	United States	51.94	Indianapolis	8 July 2009
European record	Camille Lacourt	France	52.11	Budapest	10 August 2010
Championship record	Camille Lacourt	France	52.11	Budapest	10 August 2010

== Results ==
=== Heats ===
The heats were held at 10:12.

Rank	Heat	Lane	Name	Nationality	Time	Notes
1	5	4	Chris Walker-Hebborn	Great Britain	53.88	Q
2	4	4	Jérémy Stravius	France	54.14	Q
3	3	2	Benjamin Stasiulis	France	54.27	Q
4	4	3	Jan-Philip Glania	Germany	54.47	Q
5	4	5	Christopher Ciccarese	Italy	54.71	Q
6	5	3	Nikita Ulyanov	Russia	54.85	Q
7	5	2	Luca Mencarini	Italy	54.87	Q
8	4	6	Christian Diener	Germany	54.94	Q
9	5	6	Juan Miguel Rando	Spain	54.99	Q
10	3	6	Lavrans Solli	Norway	55.01	Q
11	4	1	Gábor Balog	Hungary	55.09	Q
12	3	4	Radosław Kawęcki	Poland	55.29	Q
13	5	0	Mattias Carlsson	Sweden	55.43	Q
14	5	8	Péter Bernek	Hungary	55.46	Q
15	3	5	Niccolò Bonacchi	Italy	55.49	
16	5	5	Bastiaan Lijesen	Netherlands	55.50	Q
17	4	2	David Gamburg	Israel	55.53	Q
18	3	7	Guy Barnea	Israel	55.59	
19	4	8	Pavel Sankovich	Belarus	55.61	
19	5	7	Yakov Toumarkin	Israel	55.61	
21	3	3	Andrey Shabasov	Russia	55.63	
22	5	1	Danas Rapšys	Lithuania	55.84	
23	3	8	Viktar Staselovich	Belarus	55.86	
24	3	0	Pedro Oliveira	Portugal	55.93	
25	4	0	Nicolas Graesser	Germany	56.04	
25	4	7	Jonatan Kopelev	Israel	56.04	
27	3	1	Eric Ress	France	56.23	
28	5	9	Martin Baďura	Czech Republic	56.44	
29	3	9	Petar Petrović	Serbia	56.74	
30	4	9	Axel Pettersson	Sweden	56.87	
31	1	5	Marko Krce-Rabar	Croatia	56.96	
31	2	2	Doruk Tekin	Turkey	56.96	
33	2	4	Gytis Stankevičius	Lithuania	57.02	
34	2	3	Martin Zhelev	Bulgaria	57.11	
35	2	8	Boris Kirillov	Azerbaijan	57.23	
36	2	9	Antons Voitovs	Latvia	57.32	
37	2	1	Sergiy Varvaruk	Ukraine	57.33	
38	2	6	Teo Kolonić	Croatia	57.38	
39	2	7	Jean-François Schneiders	Luxembourg	57.50	
40	2	0	Roman Dmytriyev	Czech Republic	57.60	
41	1	4	Elijah Stolz	Switzerland	57.71	
42	1	3	Aram Kostanyan	Armenia	1:03.11	
—	2	5	Baslakov İskender	Turkey		DNS

=== Semifinals ===
The semifinals were held at 18:22.

==== Semifinal 1 ====
Rank	Lane	Name	Nationality	Time	Notes
1	4	Jérémy Stravius	France	53.93	Q
2	5	Jan-Philip Glania	Germany	54.09	Q
3	6	Christian Diener	Germany	54.24	Q
4	8	David Gamburg	Israel	54.76	Q
5	7	Radosław Kawęcki	Poland	54.92	
6	1	Péter Bernek	Hungary	54.93	
7	3	Nikita Ulyanov	Russia	55.02	
8	2	Lavrans Solli	Norway	55.06	

==== Semifinal 2 ====
Rank	Lane	Name	Nationality	Time	Notes
1	4	Chris Walker-Hebborn	Great Britain	53.62	Q
2	5	Benjamin Stasiulis	France	54.17	Q
3	6	Luca Mencarini	Italy	54.76	Q
4	2	Juan Miguel Rando	Spain	54.80	Q
5	1	Mattias Carlsson	Sweden	54.85	
6	7	Gábor Balog	Hungary	54.95	
7	3	Christopher Ciccarese	Italy	54.96	
8	8	Bastiaan Lijesen	Netherlands	55.37	

=== Final ===
The final was held at 18:19.

Rank	Lane	Name	Nationality	Time	Notes
1st place, gold medalist(s)	4	Chris Walker-Hebborn	Great Britain	53.32	
2nd place, silver medalist(s)	5	Jérémy Stravius	France	53.64	
3rd place, bronze medalist(s)	3	Jan-Philip Glania	Germany	54.15	
4	2	Christian Diener	Germany	54.23	
5	6	Benjamin Stasiulis	France	54.49	
6	1	Luca Mencarini	Italy	54.57	
7	8	Juan Miguel Rando	Spain	54.82	
8	7	David Gamburg	Israel	54.87	
