= Swimming at the 2014 Commonwealth Games – Men's 50 metre backstroke =

Men's 50 metre backstroke at the 2014 Commonwealth Games
- Venue: Tollcross International Swimming Centre
- Dates: 26 July 2014 (heats & semis); 27 July 2014 (final)
- Competitors: 37 from 28 nations
- Winning time: 24.67

Medalists
gold medal	Ben Treffers	Australia
silver medal	Mitch Larkin	Australia
bronze medal	Liam Tancock	England

The men's 50 metre backstroke event at the 2014 Commonwealth Games as part of the swimming programme took place on 26 and 27 July at the Tollcross International Swimming Centre in Glasgow, Scotland.

The medals were presented by Antonio Gopal, President of the Seychelles Olympic and Commonwealth Games Association and the quaichs were presented by Mike Summers, Chairman of the Falkland Islands Overseas Games Association.

== Records ==
Prior to this competition, the existing world and Commonwealth Games records were as follows.

World record	Liam Tancock (GBR)	24.04	Rome, Italy	2 August 2009
Commonwealth record	Liam Tancock (ENG)	24.04	Rome, Italy	2 August 2009
Games record	Liam Tancock (ENG)	24.62	Delhi, India	5 October 2010

== Results ==
=== Heats ===
Rank	Heat	Lane	Name	Nationality	Time	Notes
1	5	5	Chris Walker-Hebborn	England	25.12	Q
=2	3	5	Josh Beaver	Australia	25.28	Q
=2	5	4	Ben Treffers	Australia	25.28	Q
4	4	4	Marco Loughran	Wales	25.37	Q
5	3	4	Liam Tancock	England	25.49	Q
6	5	7	George Bovell	Trinidad and Tobago	25.50	Q
7	4	5	Mitch Larkin	Australia	25.53	Q
8	3	3	Russell Wood	Canada	25.75	Q
9	5	6	Andrew McGovern	Scotland	25.98	Q
10	4	3	Quah Zheng Wen	Singapore	25.99	Q, NR
11	3	6	Jordan Sloan	Northern Ireland	26.25	Q
12	5	3	Jack Ness	Scotland	26.47	Q
13	4	7	Grant Halsall	Isle of Man	26.51	Q
14	4	6	Rory Lamont	Scotland	26.56	Q
15	3	7	Jordan Augier	Saint Lucia	26.82	Q
16	3	2	Tom Gallichan	Jersey	27.19	Q
17	5	2	Tern Jian Han	Malaysia	27.32	
18	4	2	Timothy Wynter	Jamaica	27.47	
19	4	1	Hamdan Bayusuf	Kenya	27.53	
20	3	1	Christopher Courtis	Barbados	27.70	
21	5	1	Heshan Unamboowe	Sri Lanka	27.86	
22	5	8	James Jurkiewicz	Guernsey	27.89	
23	2	5	Igor Mogne	Mozambique	28.19	
24	2	3	Alexandros Axiotis	Zambia	28.24	
25	4	8	Alex McCallum	Cayman Islands	28.27	
26	3	8	Xander Beaton	Guernsey	28.86	
27	2	4	Jordan Gonzalez	Gibraltar	29.83	
28	2	6	Hilal Hemed Hilal	Tanzania	30.11	
29	2	8	Arnold Kisulo	Uganda	30.73	
=30	1	3	Dean Hoffman	Seychelles	30.87	
=30	2	7	Milimo Mweetwa	Zambia	30.87	
32	1	4	Andrew Hopkin	Grenada	30.97	
33	1	6	Storm Halbich	Saint Vincent and the Grenadines	31.80	
34	2	2	Haris Bandey	Pakistan	32.05	
35	2	1	Nikolas Sylvester	Saint Vincent and the Grenadines	32.28	
36	1	2	Dillon Gooding	Saint Vincent and the Grenadines	32.64	
37	1	5	Nana Antwi	Ghana	33.63	

=== Semifinals ===
Rank	Heat	Lane	Name	Nationality	Time	Notes
1	2	5	Ben Treffers	Australia	24.78	Q
2	2	4	Chris Walker-Hebborn	England	24.92	Q
3	1	5	Marco Loughran	Wales	25.12	Q
4	1	4	Josh Beaver	Australia	25.20	Q
5	2	3	Liam Tancock	England	25.21	Q
6	2	6	Mitch Larkin	Australia	25.22	Q
7	1	6	Russell Wood	Canada	25.29	Q
8	1	3	George Bovell	Trinidad and Tobago	25.39	Q
9	1	2	Quah Zheng Wen	Singapore	26.15	
10	1	7	Jack Ness	Scotland	26.17	
11	2	2	Andrew McGovern	Scotland	26.19	
12	2	7	Jordan Sloan	Northern Ireland	26.28	
13	1	1	Rory Lamont	Scotland	26.69	
14	2	1	Grant Halsall	Isle of Man	26.72	
15	2	8	Jordan Augier	Saint Lucia	26.82	
16	1	8	Tom Gallichan	Jersey	27.16	

=== Final ===
Rank	Lane	Name	Nationality	Time	Notes
1st place, gold medalist(s)	4	Ben Treffers	Australia	24.67	
2nd place, silver medalist(s)	7	Mitch Larkin	Australia	24.80	
3rd place, bronze medalist(s)	2	Liam Tancock	England	24.98	
4	5	Chris Walker-Hebborn	England	25.14	
5	6	Josh Beaver	Australia	25.19	
6	3	Marco Loughran	Wales	25.36	
7	1	Russell Wood	Canada	25.55	
8	8	Quah Zheng Wen	Singapore	26.26	

George Bovell, who qualified in eighth place, pulled out of the final to concentrate on the 50 m freestyle where he finished fifth in the final. He was replaced by the first reserve, Singapore's Quah Zheng Wen.
