= Swimming at the 2014 Commonwealth Games – Men's 100 metre backstroke =

Men's 100 metre backstroke at the 2014 Commonwealth Games
- Venue: Tollcross International Swimming Centre
- Dates: 24 July 2014 (heats & semis); 25 July 2014 (final)
- Competitors: 33 from 26 nations
- Winning time: 53.12 GR

Medalists
gold medal	Chris Walker-Hebborn	England
silver medal	Mitch Larkin	Australia
bronze medal	Liam Tancock	England
bronze medal	Josh Beaver	Australia

The men's 100 metre backstroke event at the 2014 Commonwealth Games as part of the swimming programme took place on 24 and 25 July at the Tollcross International Swimming Centre in Glasgow, Scotland.

The medals were presented by Judy Simons, President of the Bermuda Olympic Association and the quaichs were presented by Andrew Fraser, 2013 Jim Clark Memorial Award winner and Ford's Gasoline Calibration Manager.

== Records ==
Prior to this competition, the existing world and Commonwealth Games records were as follows.

World record	Aaron Peirsol (USA)	51.94	Indianapolis, United States	8 July 2009
Commonwealth record	Liam Tancock (ENG)	52.73	Rome, Italy	28 July 2009
Games record	Liam Tancock (ENG)	53.59	Delhi, India	8 October 2010

The following records were established during the competition:

Date	Event	Name	Nationality	Time	Record
24 July	Heat	Chris Walker-Hebborn	England	53.30	GR
25 July	Final	Chris Walker-Hebborn	England	53.12	GR

== Results ==
=== Heats ===
Rank	Heat	Lane	Name	Nationality	Time	Notes
1	5	4	Chris Walker-Hebborn	England	53.30	Q, GR
2	5	5	Josh Beaver	Australia	53.68	Q
3	4	4	Mitch Larkin	Australia	54.18	Q
4	5	3	Corey Main	New Zealand	54.40	Q
5	4	5	Liam Tancock	England	54.51	Q
6	3	4	Ben Treffers	Australia	54.74	Q
7	5	6	Russell Wood	Canada	54.83	Q
8	3	5	Marco Loughran	Wales	54.96	Q
9	3	3	Craig McNally	Scotland	55.28	Q
10	4	6	Ryan Bennett	Scotland	55.35	Q
11	5	2	Xavier Mohammed	Wales	55.67	Q
12	4	3	Darren Murray	South Africa	55.78	Q
13	4	2	Quah Zheng Wen	Singapore	56.37	Q
14	3	7	Otto Putland	Wales	57.31	Q
15	3	6	Grant Halsall	Isle of Man	57.82	Q
16	3	2	Jordan Sloan	Northern Ireland	58.01	Q
17	4	7	Tern Jian Han	Malaysia	58.50	
18	5	1	Heshan Unamboowe	Sri Lanka	58.76	
19	4	1	Tom Gallichan	Jersey	58.92	
20	1	3	Timothy Wynter	Jamaica	58.97	
21	5	8	Jordan Augier	Saint Lucia	59.36	
22	3	1	Christopher Courtis	Barbados	59.71	
23	5	7	Hamdan Bayusuf	Kenya	1:00.07	
24	2	4	James Jurkiewicz	Guernsey	1:00.29	
25	2	6	Igor Mogne	Mozambique	1:00.74	
26	3	8	Alex McCallum	Cayman Islands	1:01.22	
27	2	3	Alexandros Axiotis	Zambia	1:01.64	
28	4	8	William Clark	Fiji	1:01.76	
29	2	5	Mathieu Marquet	Mauritius	1:02.55	
30	2	2	Jordan Gonzalez	Gibraltar	1:04.50	NR
31	1	5	Arnold Kisulo	Uganda	1:06.41	
32	2	7	Milimo Mweetwa	Zambia	1:07.22	
33	1	4	Dean Hoffman	Seychelles	1:09.60	

=== Semifinals ===
Rank	Heat	Lane	Name	Nationality	Time	Notes
1	2	5	Mitch Larkin	Australia	53.33	Q
2	2	3	Liam Tancock	England	53.49	Q
3	2	4	Chris Walker-Hebborn	England	53.57	Q
4	1	4	Josh Beaver	Australia	53.74	Q
5	1	5	Corey Main	New Zealand	54.28	Q
6	2	2	Craig McNally	Scotland	54.40	Q
7	2	6	Russell Wood	Canada	54.45	Q
8	1	3	Ben Treffers	Australia	54.60	Q
9	1	2	Ryan Bennett	Scotland	54.87	
10	1	6	Marco Loughran	Wales	55.09	
11	2	7	Xavier Mohammed	Wales	55.26	
12	1	7	Darren Murray	South Africa	55.68	
13	2	1	Quah Zheng Wen	Singapore	56.43	
14	2	8	Grant Halsall	Isle of Man	56.78	
15	1	1	Otto Putland	Wales	56.83	
16	1	8	Jordan Sloan	Northern Ireland	57.03	

=== Final ===
Rank	Lane	Name	Nationality	Time	Notes
1st place, gold medalist(s)	3	Chris Walker-Hebborn	England	53.12	GR
2nd place, silver medalist(s)	4	Mitch Larkin	Australia	53.59	
= (bronze)	5	Liam Tancock	England	53.75	
= (bronze)	6	Josh Beaver	Australia	53.75	
5	8	Ben Treffers	Australia	53.84	
6	2	Corey Main	New Zealand	54.40	
7	7	Craig McNally	Scotland	54.54	
8	1	Russell Wood	Canada	54.56	
