= 2016 FINA World Swimming Championships (25 m) – Men's 50 metre backstroke =

Men's 50 metre backstroke at the 2016 FINA World Swimming Championships (25 m)
- Venue: WFCU Centre
- Dates: 8 December (heats and semifinals); 9 December (final)
- Competitors: 60 from 46 nations
- Winning time: 22.85

Medalists
gold medal	Junya Koga	Japan
silver medal	Jérémy Stravius	France
bronze medal	Pavel Sankovich	Belarus

The Men's 50 metre backstroke competition of the 2016 FINA World Swimming Championships (25 m) was held on 8 and 9 December 2016.

== Records ==
Prior to the competition, the existing world and championship records were as follows.

	Name	Nation	Time	Location	Date
World record Championship record	Florent Manaudou	France	22.22	Doha	6 December 2014

== Results ==
=== Heats ===
The heats were held at 10:06.

Rank	Heat	Lane	Name	Nationality	Time	Notes
1	8	5	Junya Koga	Japan	22.93	Q
2	9	4	Jérémy Stravius	France	23.09	Q
3	9	3	Xu Jiayu	China	23.42	Q
4	7	5	Miguel Ortiz-Cañavate	Spain	23.47	Q
4	9	5	Pavel Sankovich	Belarus	23.47	Q
6	7	4	Tomasz Polewka	Poland	23.50	Q
7	8	4	Mitch Larkin	Australia	23.57	Q
8	5	4	Albert Subirats	Venezuela	23.59	Q
9	8	0	Grigory Tarasevich	Russia	23.70	Q
9	8	6	Robert Glință	Romania	23.70	Q
11	8	3	Robert Hurley	Australia	23.71	Q
12	9	6	Iskender Baskalov	Turkey	23.83	Q
13	6	2	Michael Taylor	United States	23.87	Q
14	6	3	Jacob Pebley	United States	23.88	Q
15	7	6	Masaki Kaneko	Japan	23.89	Q
16	8	2	Viktar Staselovich	Belarus	23.98	Q
17	9	0	Charles Hockin	Paraguay	24.06	
18	7	2	Javier Acevedo	Canada	24.11	
19	5	7	Daniel Carranza	Mexico	24.27	
19	7	7	Lê Nguyễn Paul	Vietnam	24.27	
21	9	2	Magnus Jakupsson	Denmark	24.31	
22	8	7	Danas Rapsys	Lithuania	24.32	
23	6	4	Ryan Pini	Papua New Guinea	24.35	
24	9	1	David Gamburg	Israel	24.37	
25	8	1	Charlie Boldison	Great Britain	24.39	
26	7	2	Andrei Shabasov	Russia	24.41	
27	9	8	Thomas Avetand	France	24.45	
28	7	1	Tomas Franta	Czech Republic	24.52	
29	8	9	Apostolos Christou	Greece	24.53	
30	2	9	Anton Louie Loncar	Croatia	24.74	
31	2	8	Gaston Hernandez	Argentina	24.75	
32	7	9	Axel Pettersson	Iceland	24.85	
33	1	3	Duy Khoi Tran	Vietnam	24.90	
34	7	0	Christopher Courtis	Barbados	24.94	
34	8	8	Gabriel Lopes	Portugal	24.94	
36	5	6	Markus Thormeyer	Canada	24.97	
37	1	5	Justin Plaschka	Jamaica	25.01	
38	6	7	Neil Fair	South Africa	25.06	
39	6	5	Ricky Ellis	South Africa	25.10	
40	5	5	David Adalsteinsson	Iceland	25.24	
41	7	8	Kristinn Porarinsson	Iceland	25.27	
42	6	6	Kristóf Rasovszky	Hungary	25.49	
43	5	2	Boris Kirillov	Azerbaijan	25.61	
44	5	3	Ivo Kunzle Savastano	Paraguay	25.75	
45	5	8	Sheikh Tariq	Pakistan	25.93	
46	6	9	Gorazd Chepishevski	Macedonia	25.97	
47	6	1	Francis Fong	Singapore	26.08	
48	5	1	Eisner Barbera Espinoza	Nicaragua	26.17	
49	4	7	Keanan Michael Dols	Jamaica	26.33	
50	4	8	Adel El Fakir	Libya	26.39	
51	6	0	Pok Man Ngou	Macau	26.47	
52	4	4	Axel Steven Ngui	Philippines	26.69	
53	4	3	William Clark	Fiji	26.85	NR
54	4	0	Adil Assouab	Morocco	26.92	
55	2	0	Sébastien Kouma	Mali	26.99	
55	4	6	Jordan Gonzalez	Gibraltar	26.99	
57	1	6	Akaki Vashakidze	Georgia	27.21	
58	2	7	Mohammad Juwel Ahmed	Bangladesh	27.25	
58	5	0	Cheng Man Yum	Macau	27.25	
60	4	1	Alex McCallum	Cayman Islands	27.48	

=== Semifinals ===
The semifinals were held at 19:51.

==== Semifinal 1 ====
Rank	Lane	Name	Nationality	Time	Notes
1	4	Jérémy Stravius	France	23.16	Q
2	5	Miguel Ortiz-Cañavate	Spain	23.33	Q
3	6	Albert Subirats	Venezuela	23.37	Q
4	3	Tomasz Polewka	Poland	23.47	Q
5	1	Jacob Pebley	United States	23.63	
6	2	Robert Glință	Romania	23.64	
7	7	Iskender Baslakov	Turkey	23.85	
8	8	Viktar Staselovich	Belarus	24.08	

==== Semifinal 2 ====
Rank	Lane	Name	Nationality	Time	Notes
1	4	Junya Koga	Japan	22.81	Q
2	3	Pavel Sankovich	Belarus	23.07	Q
3	7	Robert Hurley	Australia	23.20	Q
4	5	Xu Jiayu	China	23.39	Q
5	6	Mitch Larkin	Australia	23.57	
6	2	Grigory Tarasevich	Russia	23.64	
7	8	Masaki Kaneko	Japan	23.65	
8	1	Michael Taylor	United States	23.84	

=== Final ===
The final was held at 19:32

Rank	Lane	Name	Nationality	Time	Notes
1st place, gold medalist(s)	4	Junya Koga	Japan	22.85	
2nd place, silver medalist(s)	3	Jérémy Stravius	France	22.99	
3rd place, bronze medalist(s)	5	Pavel Sankovich	Belarus	23.03	
4	7	Albert Subirats	Venezuela	23.26	
5	6	Robert Hurley	Australia	23.32	
6	2	Miguel Ortiz-Cañavate	Spain	23.40	
6	8	Tomasz Polewka	Poland	23.40	
8	1	Xu Jiayu	China	23.54	
