= Swimming at the 2014 European Aquatics Championships – Men's 4 × 100 metre medley relay =

Men's 4 × 100 metre medley relay at the Swimming at the 2014 European Aquatics Championships
- Dates: 24 August
- Competitors: 68 from 17 nations
- Winning time: 3:31.73

Medalists
gold medal	Chris Walker-Hebborn; Adam Peaty; Adam Barrett; Ben Proud	Great Britain
silver medal	Jérémy Stravius; Giacomo Perez-Dortona; Mehdy Metella; Fabien Gilot	France
bronze medal	László Cseh; Dániel Gyurta; Bence Pulai; Dominik Kozma	Hungary

The Men's 4 × 100 metre medley relay competition of the 2014 European Aquatics Championships was held on 24 August.

== Records ==
Prior to the competition, the existing world, European and championship records were as follows.

	Nation	Time	Location	Date
World record	United States	3:27.28	Rome	2 August 2009
European record	Germany	3:28.58	Rome	2 August 2009
Championship record	France	3:31.32	Budapest	15 August 2010

== Results ==
=== Heats ===
The heats were held at 10:21.

Rank	Heat	Lane	Nationality	Swimmers	Time	Notes
1	2	6	France	Benjamin Stasiulis (55.00); Giacomo Perez-Dortona (59.35); Mehdy Metella (51.47); Gregory Mallet (48.83)	3:34.65	Q
2	2	3	Hungary	László Cseh (54.28); Dániel Gyurta (59.59); Bence Pulai (52.67); Dominik Kozma (48.35)	3:34.89	Q
3	2	1	Germany	Christian Deiner (54.55); Marco Koch (1:00.38); Steffen Deibler (52.20); Markus Deibler (49.30)	3:36.43	Q
4	2	2	Great Britain	Chris Walker-Hebborn (54.82); Ross Murdoch (59.48); Adam Barrett (52.85); Stephen Milne (49.67)	3:36.82	Q
5	1	5	Russia	Nikita Ulyanov (55.55); Ilya Khomenko (1:01.59); Evgeny Korotyshkin (51.67); Sergey Fesikov (48.63)	3:37.44	Q
6	2	7	Poland	Radosław Kawęcki (55.34); Mikolaj Machnik (1:01.07); Paweł Korzeniowski (52.34); Kacper Majchrzak (49.12)	3:37.87	Q
7	2	8	Lithuania	Danas Rapsys (55.56); Giedrius Titenis (1:00.38); Tadas Duskinas (53.18); Mindaugas Sadauskas (49.41)	3:38.53	Q
8	1	1	Netherlands	Bastiaan Lijesen (56.60); Bram Dekker (1:02.68); Joeri Verlinden (51.76); Sebastiaan Verschuren (48.16)	3:39.20	Q
9	2	4	Serbia	Petar Petrovic (56.96); Caba Siladji (1:00.38); Ivan Lendjer (52.18); Radovan Siljevski (49.81)	3:39.33	
10	1	7	Italy	Niccolo Bonacchi (57.45); Andrea Toniato (1:00.93); Matteo Rivolta (52.82); Luca Dotto (48.74)	3:39.94	
11	2	5	Israel	David Gamburg (55.28); Yaron Shagalov (1:01.76); Tom Kremer (53.61); Alexi Konovalov (50.07)	3:40.72	
12	1	6	Sweden	Mattias Carlsson (55.84); Erik Persson (1:02.46); Simon Sjödin (53.26); Christoffer Carlsen (49.22)	3:40.78	
13	2	0	Greece	Andreas Vazaios (56.68); Ioannis Karpouzlis (1:01.98); Stefanos Dimitriadis (53.82); Christos Katrantzis (49.09)	3:41.57	
14	1	3	Czech Republic	Martin Badura (56.79); Petr Barturek (1:02.37); Tomas Havranek (55.14); Martin Verner (49.31)	3:43.61	
15	1	8	Portugal	Pedro Oliveira (55.95); Carlos Almeida (1:03.79); Nuno Quintanilha (54.15); Diogo Carvalho (50.63)	3:44.52	
16	1	0	Luxembourg	Jean-François Schneiders (57.04); Laurent Carnol (1:01.58); Raphaël Stacchiotti (55.60); Julien Henx (50.96)	3:45.18	
17	1	2	Turkey	Doruk Tekin (56.85); Alpkan Ornek (1:03.57); Baskalov Iskender (55.12); Doga Celik (51.96)	3:47.50	
—	1	4	Switzerland			DNS

=== Final ===
The final was held at 10:21.

Rank	Lane	Nationality	Swimmers	Time	Notes
1st place, gold medalist(s)	6	Great Britain	Chris Walker-Hebborn (54.04); Adam Peaty (58.55); Adam Barrett (50.69); Ben Proud (48.45)	3:31.73	
2nd place, silver medalist(s)	4	France	Jérémy Stravius (53.79); Giacomo Perez-Dortona (1:00.04); Mehdy Metella (51.22); Fabien Gilot (47.42)	3:32.47	
3rd place, bronze medalist(s)	5	Hungary	László Cseh (54.38); Dániel Gyurta (59.64); Bence Pulai (52.01); Dominik Kozma (47.08)	3:33.11	
4	3	Germany	Jan-Philip Glania (54.40); Marco Koch (59.43); Steffen Deibler (51.68); Paul Biedermann (48.41)	3:33.92	
5	2	Russia	Vladimir Morozov (54.68); Andrey Nikolaev (1:00.49); Nikita Konovalov (51.54); Alexander Sukhorukov (47.52)	3:34.23	
6	7	Poland	Radosław Kawęcki (54.86); Mikolaj Machnik (1:00.68); Paweł Korzeniowski (51.75); Konrad Czerniak (47.22)	3:34.51	
7	1	Lithuania	Danas Rapsys (54.86); Giedrius Titenis (59.61); Tadas Duskinas (52.67); Mindaugas Sadauskas (49.04)	3:36.18	
8	8	Netherlands	Bastiaan Lijesen (56.13); Bram Dekker (1:01.66); Joeri Verlinden (51.63); Sebastiaan Verschuren (48.43)	3:37.85	
