= 2014 FINA World Swimming Championships (25 m) – Mixed 4 × 50 metre freestyle relay =

4 × 50 metre mixed freestyle relay at the 2014 FINA World Swimming Championships (25 m)
- Dates: 6 December
- Competitors: 84 from 21 nations
- Winning time: 1:28.57

Medalists
gold medal	Josh Schneider; Matt Grevers; Madison Kennedy; Abbey Weitzeil	United States
silver medal	Evgeny Sedov; Vladimir Morozov; Veronika Popova; Rozaliya Nasretdinova	Russia
bronze medal	César Cielo; João de Lucca; Etiene Medeiros; Larissa Oliveira	Brazil

The 4 × 50 metre mixed freestyle relay competition of the 2014 FINA World Swimming Championships (25 m) was held on 6 December.

== Records ==
Prior to the competition, the existing world and championship records were as follows.

	Nation	Time	Location	Date
World record	Russia	1:29.53	Herning	14 December 2013

The following records were established during the competition:

Date	Event	Nation	Time	Record
6 December	Final	United States	1:28.57	WR

== Results ==
=== Heats ===
The heats were held at 12:37.

Rank	Heat	Lane	Nation	Swimmers	Time	Notes
1	2	5	United States	Josh Schneider (21.81); Darian Townsend (21.58); Amy Bilquist (23.91); Natalie Coughlin (23.50)	1:30.80	Q
2	2	1	Brazil	Alan Vitória (21.70); Henrique Martins (21.31); Daiane Oliveira (24.30); Alessandra Marchioro (24.37)	1:31.68	Q
3	1	1	Germany	Marco di Carli (22.00); Steffen Deibler (21.48); Dorothea Brandt (23.82); Daniela Schreiber (24.44)	1:31.74	Q
4	3	8	Russia	Oleg Tikhobaev (21.10); Nikita Konovalov (21.43); Veronika Popova (24.15); Margarita Nesterova (25.12)	1:31.80	Q
5	2	3	Italy	Marco Belotti (21.91); Niccolo Bonacchi (21.90); Silvia Di Pietro (24.28); Erika Ferraioli (23.98)	1:32.07	Q
6	1	2	Ukraine	Bogdan Plavin (22.18); Daryna Zevina (24.53); Hanna Dzerkal (24.81); Andriy Hovorov (20.87)	1:32.39	Q
7	3	6	South Africa	Luke Pendock (22.04); Clayton Jimmie (21.51); Lehesta Kemp (24.84); Trudi Maree (24.89)	1:33.28	Q
8	1	3	Norway	Sindri Jakobsson (22.84); Sverre Naess (22.61); Cecilie Johannessen (24.53); Susann Bjornsen (24.50)	1:34.48	Q
9	3	5	Japan	Reo Sakata (22.38); Yuki Kawachi (21.15); Asami Chida (25.58); Rena Nishiwaki (25.53)	1:34.64	
10	3	7	Hong Kong	Ng Chun Nam Derick (23.16); Chan Kin Lok (25.51); Mak Ho Lun Raymond (22.02); Stephanie Au (25.11)	1:35.80	
11	1	6	Algeria	Nazim Belkhodja (22.66); Souad Nafissa Cherouati (26.51); Sahnoune Oussama (21.68); Amira Raja Kouza (26.84)	1:37.69	
12	1	7	Thailand	Gavin Alexander Lewis (23.28); Jenjira Srisa Ard (25.08); Araya Wongvat (27.18); Kitiphat Pipimnan (22.92)	1:38.46	
13	3	0	Iceland	Davíð Hildiberg Aðalsteinsson (23.28); Inga Elín Cryer (26.49); Kristofer Sigurðsson (23.24); Eygló Ósk Gústafsdóttir (26.23)	1:39.24	
14	3	1	Macau	Lei On Kei (26.22); Sio Ka Kun (23.53); Chao Man Hou (22.77); Tan Chi Yan (26.96)	1:39.48	
15	1	8	Papua New Guinea	Stanford Kawale (23.86); Shanice Paraka (28.47); Anna-Liza Mopio-Jane (26.70); Ryan Pini (21.35)	1:40.38	
16	2	7	Mexico	Andrés Olvera (24.21); Montserrat Ortuño (27.64); Daniel Carranza (22.05); Ayumi Macías (27.51)	1:41.41	
17	1	4	Philippines	Rafael Santa Maria (24.18); Ariana Herranz (28.84); Jethro Chua (23.81); Evangelio Dato (26.07)	1:42.90	
18	2	8	Kenya	Hamdan Bayusuf (24.55); Talisa Lanoe (27.43); Micah Fernandes (24.79); Emily Muteti (27.80)	1:44.57	
19	2	2	San Marino	Gianluca Pasolini (25.08); Cristian Santi (24.43); Beatrice Felice (28.11); Elena Giovannini (27.03)	1:44.65	
20	3	3	Seychelles	Adam Moncherry (25.36); Alexus Laird (30.23); Anisha Payet (25.45); Dean Hoffman (24.15)	1:45.19	
21	2	0	Albania	Klavio Meça (26.31); Diana Basho (30.83); Nikol Merizaj (28.66); Franci Aleksi (25.44)	1:51.24	
—	1	5	China			DNS
—	2	4	Tajikistan			DNS
—	2	6	Sri Lanka			DNS
—	3	2	Hungary			DNS
—	3	4	Great Britain			DNS

=== Final ===
The final was held at 19:39.

Rank	Lane	Nation	Swimmers	Time	Notes
1st place, gold medalist(s)	4	United States	Josh Schneider (20.94); Matt Grevers (20.75); Madison Kennedy (23.63); Abbey Weitzeil (23.25)	1:28.57	WR
2nd place, silver medalist(s)	6	Russia	Evgeny Sedov (20.59); Vladimir Morozov (20.65); Veronika Popova (23.93); Rozaliya Nasretdinova (23.96)	1:29.13	ER
3rd place, bronze medalist(s)	5	Brazil	César Cielo (20.65); João de Lucca (21.03); Etiene Medeiros (23.58); Larissa Oliveira (23.91)	1:29.17	SA
4	2	Italy	Luca Dotto (21.61); Marco Orsi (20.44); Silvia Di Pietro (23.92); Erika Ferraioli (23.25)	1:29.22	
5	3	Germany	Steffen Deibler (21.74); Marco di Carli (21.11); Dorothea Brandt (23.58); Daniela Schreiber (24.12)	1:30.55	
6	7	Ukraine	Bogdan Plavin (21.97); Daryna Zevina (24.26); Hanna Dzerkal (24.69); Andriy Hovorov (20.59)	1:31.51	
7	1	South Africa	Luke Pendock (22.01); Clayton Jimmie (21.30); Lehesta Kemp (24.90); Trudi Maree (24.98)	1:33.19	
8	8	Norway	Lavrans Solli (22.67); Sindri Jakobsson (22.24); Cecilie Johannessen (24.44); Susann Bjornsen (24.53)	1:33.88	
