= Swimming at the 2016 Summer Olympics – Men's 100 metre backstroke =

Men's 100 metre backstroke at the Games of the XXXI Olympiad
- Venue: Olympic Aquatics Stadium
- Dates: 7 August 2016 (heats & semifinals); 8 August 2016 (final)
- Competitors: 39 from 32 nations
- Winning time: 51.97 OR

Medalists
1st place, gold medalist(s)		Ryan Murphy	United States
2nd place, silver medalist(s)		Xu Jiayu	China
3rd place, bronze medalist(s)		David Plummer	United States

The men's 100 metre backstroke event at the 2016 Summer Olympics took place between 7–8 August at the Olympic Aquatics Stadium.

== Summary ==
Ryan Murphy continued the streak of American dominance in the sprint backstroke, as he pulled away from the rest of the field to claim his country's sixth straight Olympic title. He fired off a 51.97 to eclipse Matt Grevers' 2012 Olympic record by 0.19 of a second for gold, making him the only second swimmer in the event's history besides Aaron Peirsol to break the 52-second barrier and the fastest of all time in textile. Meanwhile, China's Xu Jiayu put up a brisk effort to take silver with a 52.31, and spoil the 1–2 finish for the Americans. Murphy's fellowman David Plummer, aged 30, finished with bronze in 52.40 at his maiden Games.

Leading the race early on the initial length, Australia's defending world champion Mitch Larkin missed the podium with a fourth-place time in 52.43. France's Camille Lacourt picked up the fifth spot in 52.70, with Russian swimmer and Youth Olympic champion Evgeny Rylov (52.74) trailing him by a 0.04-second margin. Japan's Ryosuke Irie (53.42), the Olympic bronze medalist from London 2012, and Romania's Robert Glință (53.50) rounded out the field.

The medals for the competition were presented by Albert II, Prince of Monaco, IOC member, and the gifts were presented by Mustapha Larfaoui, FINA honorary life president.

== Records ==
Prior to this competition, the existing world and Olympic records were as follows.

World record	Aaron Peirsol (USA)	51.94	Indianapolis, United States	8 July 2009
Olympic record	Matt Grevers (USA)	52.16	London, United Kingdom	30 July 2012

The following records were established during the competition:

Date	Round	Name	Nation	Time	Record
8 August	Final	Ryan Murphy	United States	51.97	OR

Murphy then set a new world record for the 100 m backstroke with a time of 51.85 seconds on August 13 in the lead-off leg as part of the 4 × 100 m medley relay.

== Competition format ==
The competition consisted of three rounds: heats, semifinals, and a final. The swimmers with the best 16 times in the heats advanced to the semifinals. The swimmers with the best 8 times in the semifinals advanced to the final. Swim-offs were used as necessary to break ties for advancement to the next round.

== Results ==
=== Heats ===
Rank	Heat	Lane	Name	Nationality	Time	Notes
1	5	5	Camille Lacourt	France	52.96	Q
2	3	5	Xu Jiayu	China	53.01	Q
3	5	4	Mitch Larkin	Australia	53.04	Q
4	3	4	Ryan Murphy	United States	53.06	Q
5	4	4	David Plummer	United States	53.19	Q
6	3	3	Evgeny Rylov	Russia	53.25	Q
7	5	1	Joshua Beaver	Australia	53.47	Q
8	5	3	Ryosuke Irie	Japan	53.49	Q
9	4	2	Robert Glință	Romania	53.51	Q
10	4	5	Chris Walker-Hebborn	Great Britain	53.54	Q
11	4	3	Grigoriy Tarasevich	Russia	53.65	Q
12	4	6	Christopher Reid	South Africa	53.68	Q
13	5	6	Guilherme Guido	Brazil	53.80	Q
14	3	1	Shane Ryan	Ireland	53.85	Q, NR
15	3	2	Jan-Philip Glania	Germany	53.87	Q
16	2	6	Corey Main	New Zealand	53.99	Q
17	4	7	Javier Acevedo	Canada	54.11	
18	5	2	Apostolos Christou	Greece	54.12	
19	5	7	Junya Hasegawa	Japan	54.17	
20	2	1	Hugo González	Spain	54.18	
21	2	5	Li Guangyuan	China	54.36	
22	4	8	Quah Zheng Wen	Singapore	54.38	
23	4	1	Radosław Kawęcki	Poland	54.39	
24	2	4	Danas Rapšys	Lithuania	54.40	
25	3	8	Gábor Balog	Hungary	54.48	
26	2	3	Tomasz Polewka	Poland	54.52	
27	3	7	Yakov Toumarkin	Israel	54.66	
28	3	6	Simone Sabbioni	Italy	54.91	
29	5	8	Mikita Tsmyh	Belarus	54.97	
30	2	7	Won Young-jun	South Korea	55.05	
31	2	8	Albert Subirats	Venezuela	55.44	
32	2	2	Viktar Staselovich	Belarus	55.68	
33	1	4	Merdan Ataýew	Turkmenistan	56.34	NR
34	1	5	Timothy Wynter	Jamaica	57.20	
35	1	3	David Van der Colff	Botswana	57.77	
36	1	6	Driss Lahrichi	Morocco	58.01	
37	1	2	Yaaqoub Al-Saadi	United Arab Emirates	59.58	
38	1	1	Hamdan Bayusuf	Kenya	1:00.28	
39	1	7	Noah Al-Khulaifi	Qatar	1:07.47	

=== Semifinals ===
==== Semifinal 1 ====
Rank	Lane	Name	Nationality	Time	Notes
1	5	Ryan Murphy	United States	52.49	Q
2	4	Xu Jiayu	China	52.73	Q
3	3	Evgeny Rylov	Russia	52.84	Q
4	6	Irie Ryosuke	Japan	53.21	Q
5	7	Christopher Reid	South Africa	53.70	
6	2	Chris Walker-Hebborn	Great Britain	53.75	
7	8	Corey Main	New Zealand	54.29	
8	1	Shane Ryan	Ireland	54.40	

==== Semifinal 2 ====
Rank	Lane	Name	Nationality	Time	Notes
1	3	David Plummer	United States	52.50	Q
2	5	Mitch Larkin	Australia	52.70	Q
3	4	Camille Lacourt	France	52.72	Q
4	2	Robert Glință	Romania	53.34	Q, NR
5	7	Grigoriy Tarasevich	Russia	53.46	
6	8	Jan-Philip Glania	Germany	53.94	
7	6	Joshua Beaver	Australia	53.95	
8	1	Guilherme Guido	Brazil	54.16	

=== Final ===
Rank	Lane	Name	Nationality	Time	Notes
1st place, gold medalist(s)	4	Ryan Murphy	United States	51.97	OR
2nd place, silver medalist(s)	2	Xu Jiayu	China	52.31	NR
3rd place, bronze medalist(s)	5	David Plummer	United States	52.40	
4	3	Mitch Larkin	Australia	52.43	
5	6	Camille Lacourt	France	52.70	
6	7	Evgeny Rylov	Russia	52.74	
7	1	Ryosuke Irie	Japan	53.42	
8	8	Robert Glință	Romania	53.50	
