= 2014 FINA World Swimming Championships (25 m) – Mixed 4 × 50 metre medley relay =

4 × 50 metre mixed medley relay at the 2014 FINA World Swimming Championships (25 m)
- Dates: 3 December
- Competitors: 108 from 27 nations
- Winning time: 1:37.26

Medalists
gold medal	Etiene Medeiros; Felipe França Silva; Nicholas Santos; Larissa Oliveira	Brazil
silver medal	Chris Walker-Hebborn; Adam Peaty; Siobhan-Marie O'Connor; Fran Halsall	Great Britain
bronze medal	Niccolo Bonacchi; Fabio Scozzoli; Silvia Di Pietro; Erika Ferraioli	Italy

The 4 × 50 metre mixed medley relay competition of the 2014 FINA World Swimming Championships (25 m) was held on 4 December.

== Records ==
Prior to the competition, the existing world and championship records were as follows.

	Nation	Time	Location	Date
World record	United States	1:37.17	Glasgow	21 December 2013

== Results ==
=== Heats ===
The heats were held at 12:06.

Rank	Heat	Lane	Nation	Swimmers	Time	Notes
1	3	4	Great Britain	Chris Walker-Hebborn (23.47); Adam Peaty (25.78); Siobhan-Marie O'Connor (25.59); Fran Halsall (23.32)	1:38.16	Q
2	3	5	United States	Eugene Godsoe (23.30); Brad Craig (26.35); Felicia Lee (25.58); Natalie Coughlin (23.55)	1:38.78	Q
3	2	3	Italy	Simone Sabbioni (23.91); Fabio Scozzoli (26.02); Silvia Di Pietro (25.46); Erika Ferraioli (23.52)	1:38.91	Q
4	1	1	Russia	Sergey Fesikov (23.28); Sergey Geybel (25.97); Svetlana Chimrova (25.75); Rozaliya Nasretdinova (24.37)	1:39.37	Q
5	3	1	Brazil	Etiene Medeiros (26.44); João Luiz Gomes Júnior (26.34); Henrique Martins (22.56); Daiane Oliveira (24.26)	1:39.60	Q
6	2	1	Germany	Christian Diener (23.33); Dorothea Brandt (29.99); Steffen Deibler (22.64); Daniela Schreiber (24.12)	1:40.08	Q
7	1	5	China	Sun Xiaolei (23.78); Suo Ran (30.16); Lu Ying (25.45); Ning Zetao (20.87)	1:40.26	Q
8	2	2	Ukraine	Daryna Zevina (26.30); Mariya Liver (29.66); Andriy Hovorov (22.60); Bogdan Plavin (21.79)	1:40.35	Q
9	2	5	Czech Republic	Simona Baumrtová (26.56); Petr Bartůněk (26.36); Jan Šefl (23.13); Anna Kolárová (24.72)	1:40.77	
10	1	4	Japan	Yuki Shirai (23.97); Satomi Suzuki (30.18); Takuro Fujii (22.99); Yayoi Matsumoto (24.64)	1:41.78	
11	1	3	Norway	Lavrans Solli (23.93); Sverre Naess (27.26); Elise Olsen (26.20); Cecilie Johannessen (24.68)	1:42.07	
12	3	6	South Africa	Ricky Ellis (24.24); Giulio Zorzi (26.45); Trudi Maree (27.18); Lehesta Kemp (24.66)	1:42.53	
13	3	2	Hungary	Gábor Balog (24.45); David Horváth (27.44); Liliána Szilágyi (26.65); Fanni Gyurinovics (25.66)	1:44.20	
14	1	2	Hong Kong	Stephanie Au (27.63); Wong Chun Yan (27.62); Chan Kin Lok (27.25); Mak Ho Lun Raymond (22.11)	1:44.61	
15	3	0	Turkey	Ekaterina Avramova (27.52); Alpkan Örnek (28.54); Sezin Eligül (27.58); Hüseyin Sakçı (22.36)	1:46.00	
16	2	0	Iceland	Eygló Ósk Gústafsdóttir (28.19); Hrafnhildur Lúthersdóttir (30.28); Daníel Hannes Pálsson (25.15); Davíð Hildiberg Aðalsteinsson (22.94)	1:46.56	
17	1	6	Algeria	Ryad Djendouci (25.32); Amira Raja Kouza (32.12); Jugurtha Boumali (24.05); Souad Nafissa Cherouati (26.07)	1:47.56	
18	2	7	Thailand	Araya Wongvat (29.32); Sittivech Kongsomrerk (28.50); Jenjira Srisa Ard (26.63); Gavin Alexander Lewis (23.18)	1:47.63	
19	2	4	Philippines	Roxanne Ashley Yu (30.20); Dhill Anderson Lee (29.50); Evangelio Dato (27.39); Jeremy Bryan Lim (23.58)	1:50.67	
20	1	8	Papua New Guinea	Ryan Pini (24.08); Savannah Tkatchenko (34.30); Stanford Kawale (25.67); Anna-Liza Mopio-Jane (26.66)	1:50.71	
21	3	3	Seychelles	Alexus Laird (28.59); Pierre-Andre Adam (30.11); Felicity Passon (28.63); Dean Hoffman (24.17)	1:51.50	
22	3	7	Mexico	Daniel Carranza (24.51); Andrés Olvera (30.25); Montserrat Ortuño (29.63); Ayumi Macías (27.22)	1:51.61	
23	1	7	Macau	Yum Cheng Man (27.42); Lei On Kei (32.87); Chao Man Hou (24.55); Tan Chi Yan (27.04)	1:51.88	
24	2	6	Sri Lanka	Kimiko Raheem (30.35); Kiran Jasinghe (30.16); Cherantha de Silva (25.43); Machiko Raheem (26.64)	1:52.58	
25	2	8	Kenya	Hamdan Bayusuf (26.66); Micah Fernandes (29.83); Emily Muteti (29.46); Talisa Lanoe (27.28)	1:53.23	
26	1	0	Albania	Aleksander Ngresi (31.74); Deni Baholli (32.22); Diana Basho (33.13); Nikol Merizaj (28.47)	2:05.56	
—	3	8	Finland	Anni Alitalo (27.46); Jenna Laukkanen; Riku Pöytäkivi; Ari-Pekka Liukkonen	DSQ	

=== Final ===
The final were held at 20:18.

Rank	Lane	Nation	Swimmers	Time	Notes
1st place, gold medalist(s)	2	Brazil	Etiene Medeiros (25.83); Felipe França Silva (25.45); Nicholas Santos (21.81); Larissa Oliveira (24.17)	1:37.26	SA
2nd place, silver medalist(s)	4	Great Britain	Chris Walker-Hebborn (23.42); Adam Peaty (25.89); Siobhan-Marie O'Connor (25.10); Fran Halsall (23.05)	1:37.46	ER
3rd place, bronze medalist(s)	3	Italy	Niccolo Bonacchi (23.58); Fabio Scozzoli (25.55); Silvia Di Pietro (25.22); Erika Ferraioli (23.55)	1:37.90	
4	5	United States	Matt Grevers (23.28); Cody Miller (25.93); Felicia Lee (25.38); Abbey Weitzeil (23.57)	1:38.16	
5	6	Russia	Sergey Fesikov (23.17); Sergey Geybel (26.20); Anastasiia Liazeva (25.68); Rozaliya Nasretdinova (23.88)	1:38.93	
6	1	China	Sun Xiaolei (23.51); Suo Ran (30.28); Lu Ying (24.79); Ning Zetao (20.59)	1:39.17	
7	7	Germany	Christian Diener (23.30); Dorothea Brandt (29.59); Steffen Deibler (22.41); Daniela Schreiber (24.17)	1:39.47	
8	8	Ukraine	Daryna Zevina (26.10); Andriy Kovalenko (26.39); Andriy Hovorov (22.37); Hanna Dzerkal (24.62)	1:39.48	
