= David Plummer (swimmer) =

American swimmer (born 1985)

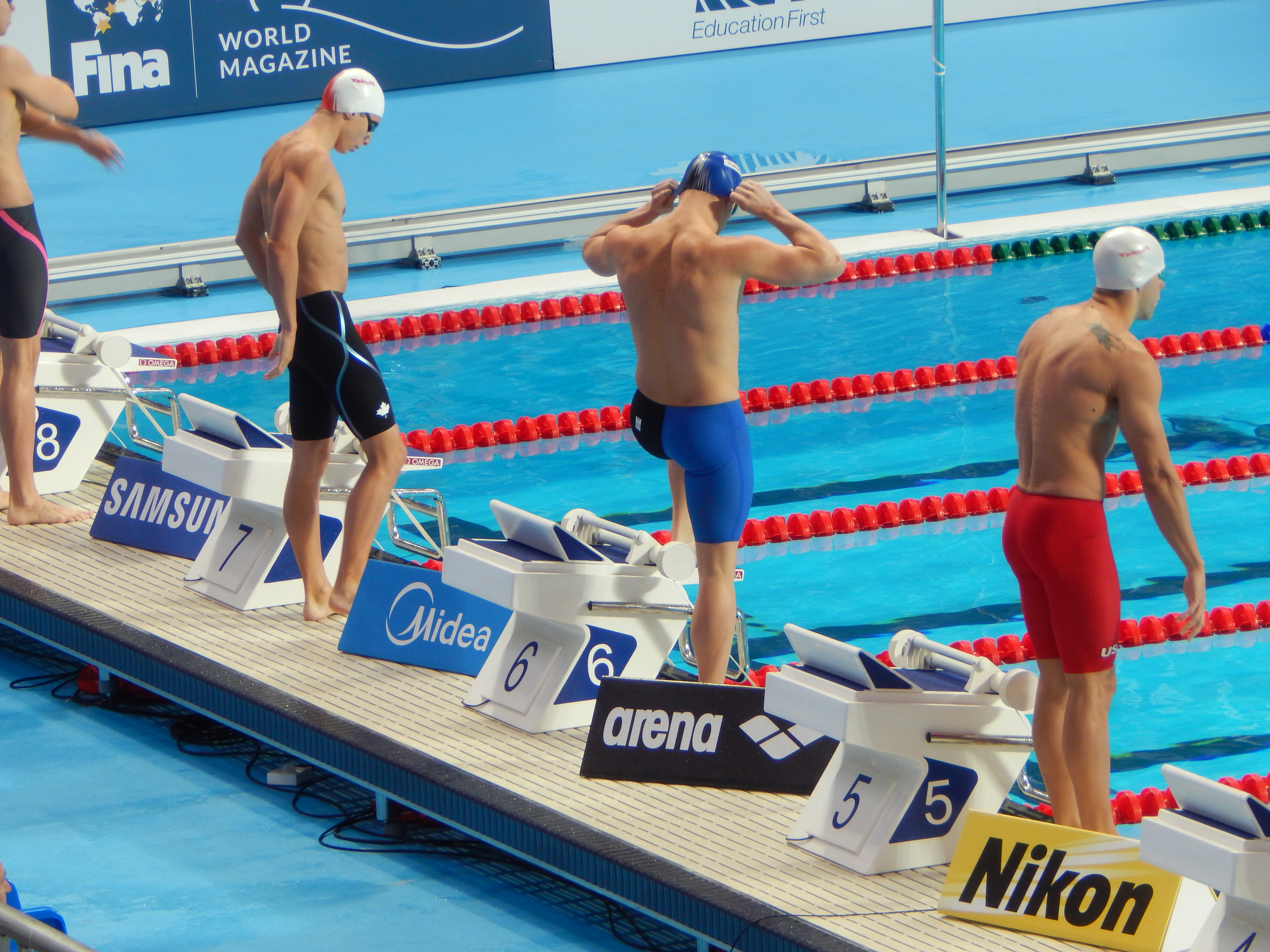

Personal information
- Full name: David Edward Plummer
- National team: United States
- Born: October 9, 1985 (age 40) Norman, Oklahoma, U.S.
- Height: 6 ft 3 in (191 cm)
- Weight: 210 lb (95 kg)

Sport
- Sport: Swimming
- Strokes: Backstroke
- Club: New York Athletic Club (NYAC)
- College team: University of Minnesota
Medal record
Men's swimming
Representing United States
Olympic Games
Gold medal – first place	2016 Rio de Janeiro	4×100 m medley
Bronze medal – third place	2016 Rio de Janeiro	100 m backstroke
World Championships (LC)
Gold medal – first place	2011 Shanghai	4×100 m medley
Silver medal – second place	2013 Barcelona	100 m backstroke
World Championships (SC)
Gold medal – first place	2010 Dubai	4×100 m medley

David Edward Plummer (born October 9, 1985) is a retired American competition swimmer who specialized in backstroke events. He won bronze and gold medals at the 2016 Summer Olympics.

== Swimming career ==
Plummer was a 14-time All-American at the University of Minnesota from 2004–08, ranking as the seventh-most All-America honors in program history. As a sophomore in 2006, he earned First Team All-America honors in the 100 backstroke (fifth place) and 200 backstroke (eighth place). He repeated a fifth-place finish as a junior in the 200 backstroke and took ninth in the 100. Plummer graduated with school records in the short course and long course 100 and 200 backstroke events.

In 2006 and 2010, Plummer was named a member of the US Pan-Pacific Championship team, where he competed in the backstroke. In 2007, Plummer competed at the World University Games, again in the backstroke.

At the 2010 FINA Short Course World Championships in Dubai, Plummer won a gold medal in the 4×100-meter medley relay for his contributions in the heats. Plummer also competed in the 50- and 100-meter backstroke in Dubai but finished out of medal contention in both events. He was subsequently named a member of the 2010–2011 U.S. National Team.

At the 2011 World Aquatics Championships in Shanghai, Plummer placed fifth in the final of the 100-meter backstroke with a time of 53.04. In the 50-meter backstroke final, Plummer placed fifth with a time of 24.92. On the last day of competition, Plummer won a gold medal in the 4×100-meter medley relay for his contributions in the heats.

At the 2012 U.S. Olympic Trials, Plummer narrowly missed making the Olympic Team by .12 seconds in the 100 backstroke in a time of 52.98. He finished just behind Grevers and Nick Thoman.

At the 2013 U.S. National Championships, Plummer qualified to swim in two individual events at the 2013 World Aquatics Championships. At the National Championships, he finished first in the 100-meter backstroke with a time of 53.10, upsetting the Olympic gold medalist Matt Grevers. Plummer also finished first in the 50-meter backstroke, breaking the US Open record in the process with a time of 24.52.

At the 2013 World Aquatics Championships, Plummer competed in three events: the 100-meter backstroke, the 50-meter backstroke, and the prelims of the 4x100-meter medley relay. In the individual 100-meter backstroke, Plummer finished second in the event, finishing behind teammate Matt Grevers with a time of 53.12 and improving upon his 5th-place finish from 2011. In the 50-meter backstroke, Plummer slipped on the start in the semifinals, causing him to finish 16th overall, unable to qualify for the finals. Plummer lost out his last chance of a gold medal in the 4x100-meter medley relay, when the team was disqualified for a false start in the final.

In 2016, he placed second in the 100-meter backstroke at the U.S. Olympic Swimming Trials to qualify for the Olympics in Rio de Janeiro. He clocked a time of 52.28, just behind Ryan Murphy's time of 52.26. He became the oldest first-time Olympian on the U.S. Olympic Swim Team since 1904 at age 30.

At the 2016 Summer Olympics, Plummer won the bronze medal in the 100-meter backstroke final in a time of 52.40 seconds.

In January 2017, Plummer retired from competitive swimming.

== Personal life ==
Plummer was born in Norman, Oklahoma, to Don and Kathy Plummer. He has three brothers: Roy, Ryan, and Nate, all of whom are former swimmers. Plummer graduated from the University of Minnesota in 2008. In 2012, he married Dr. Erin Forster who was also a swimmer at the University of Minnesota; they have two sons, Will and Ricky.

While swimming professionally, Plummer served as the head boys swimming and diving coach at Wayzata High School. During his first year as head coach, he led the team to its first-ever state title on the way to winning Minnesota state coach of the year. He served as head coach for three seasons, winning a section title each year. In 2024, he returned to the position.

Plummer has served on the board of the United States Anti-Doping Agency since 2018.
