= Henrique Martins =

Brazilian swimmer and male pageant titleholder

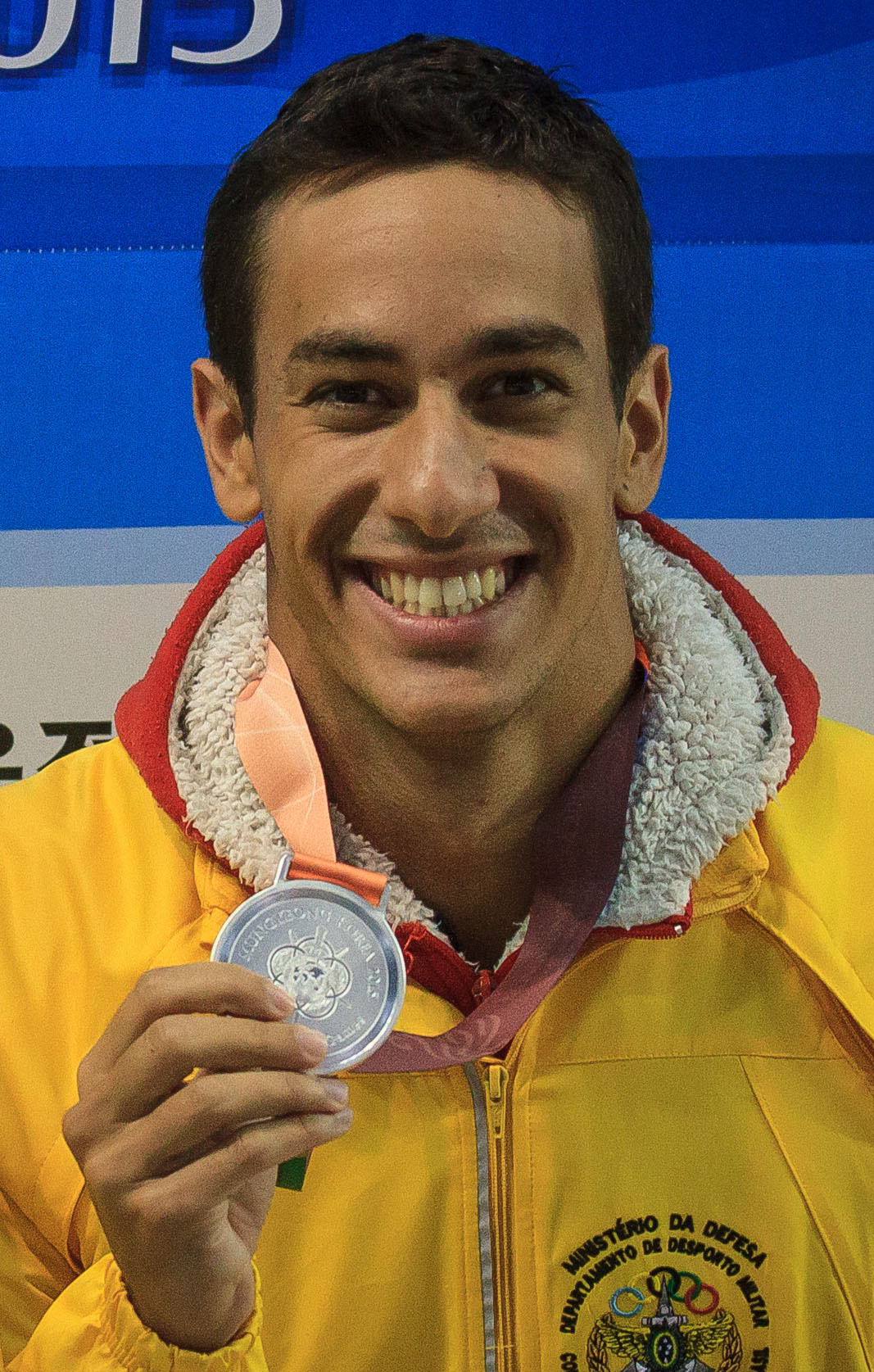
- Henrique Martins, 2015

Personal information
- Full name: Henrique de Souza Martins
- Nationality: Brazil
- Born: 14 November 1991 (age 34) Campinas, São Paulo, Brazil

Sport
- Sport: Swimming
- Strokes: Butterfly
Medal record
Men's swimming
Representing Brazil
World Championships (SC)
Gold medal – first place	2014 Doha	4×50 m medley
Gold medal – first place	2014 Doha	4×100 m medley
Gold medal – first place	2014 Doha	4×50 m mixed medley
Bronze medal – third place	2014 Doha	4×50 m mixed free
Universiade
Gold medal – first place	2015 Gwangju	100 m freestyle
Gold medal – first place	2015 Gwangju	50 m butterfly
Silver medal – second place	2011 Shenzhen	4×100 m freestyle
Silver medal – second place	2015 Gwangju	50 m freestyle
Bronze medal – third place	2017 Taipei	50 m butterfly
Bronze medal – third place	2017 Taipei	100 m butterfly

Henrique Martins

Henrique de Souza Martins (born 14 November 1991 in Campinas) is a Brazilian competitive swimmer and male pageant titleholder who won Mister Brazil 2023. He represented Brazil at the Mister Supranational 2023 competition in Małopolska, Poland and finished first runner-up.

== International career ==
=== 2008–12 ===
He participated at 2008 FINA Youth World Swimming Championships in Monterrey.

At the 2011 Summer Universiade in Shenzhen, China, Martins won a silver medal in the 4×100-metre freestyle relay.

=== 2013–16 ===
Martins entered into a University in 2013, in a course of Tourism.

At the 2014 FINA World Swimming Championships (25 m) in Doha, Qatar, Martins won four medals in four Brazilian relays, by participating at heats. He won the gold medal in the Men's 4 × 50 metre medley relay, Men's 4 × 100 metre medley relay, 4 × 50 metre mixed medley relay, and a bronze medal in the 4 × 50 metre mixed freestyle relay. Martins also finished 8th in the Men's 4 × 100 metre freestyle relay, 15th in the Men's 50 metre butterfly and 16th in the Men's 50 metre backstroke.

At the 2015 Summer Universiade in Gwangju, South Korea, Martins won two gold medals in the 100-metre freestyle and in the 50-metre butterfly, and a silver medal in the 100-metre freestyle.

=== 2016 Summer Olympics ===
At the 2016 Summer Olympics, Martins finished 6th in the Men's 4 × 100 metre medley relay, and 21st in the Men's 100 metre butterfly.

=== 2017-20 ===
At the 2017 World Aquatics Championships in Budapest, in the Men's 50 metre butterfly, he went to his first World Championship individual final of his career, finishing in 6th place. He also finished 11th in the Men's 100 metre butterfly, and 5th In the Men's 4 × 100 metre medley relay, along with Guilherme Guido, João Gomes Júnior and Marcelo Chierighini.

== Pageantry ==
In 2023, Martins won the Mister Brazil competition, and represented the country at the Mister Supranational 2023 contest in Małopolska, Poland, where he finished first-runner up to Iván Álvarez of Spain.
