= Guilherme Guido =

Brazilian swimmer (born 1987)

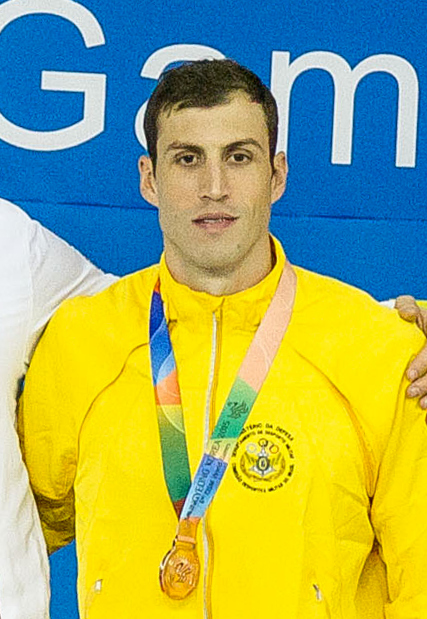
- Guido at the 2015 Military World Games

Personal information
- Full name: Guilherme Augusto Guido
- Nationality: Brazil
- Born: February 12, 1987 (age 39) Limeira, São Paulo, Brazil
- Height: 1.94 m (6 ft 4 in)
- Weight: 100 kg (220 lb)

Sport
- Sport: Swimming
- Strokes: Backstroke
Medal record
World Championships (SC)
Gold medal – first place	2014 Doha	4×50 m medley
Gold medal – first place	2014 Doha	4×100 m medley
Bronze medal – third place	2010 Dubai	4×100 m medley
Bronze medal – third place	2012 Istanbul	100 m backstroke
Bronze medal – third place	2018 Hangzhou	4×50 m medley
Pan American Games
Gold medal – first place	2011 Guadalajara	4×100 m medley
Gold medal – first place	2015 Toronto	4×100 m medley
Gold medal – first place	2019 Lima	4×100 m mixed medley
Silver medal – second place	2015 Toronto	100 m backstroke
Silver medal – second place	2019 Lima	100 m backstroke
Silver medal – second place	2019 Lima	4×100 m medley
Bronze medal – third place	2011 Guadalajara	100 m backstroke
South American Games
Gold medal – first place	2010 Medellín	50 m backstroke
Gold medal – first place	2010 Medellín	100 m backstroke
Gold medal – first place	2010 Medellín	4×100 m medley
Silver medal – second place	2006 Buenos Aires	200 m backstroke
Bronze medal – third place	2006 Buenos Aires	100 m backstroke
Military World Games
Bronze medal – third place	2015 Mungyeong	100 m backstroke

Guilherme Augusto Guido (born 12 February 1987) is a Brazilian backstroke swimmer who specializes in sprint events. He was twice a finalist in the 100 metre backstroke at World Championships

When Guido was young, he was a big rival of César Cielo. In the tournaments in the region of Campinas, Guido used to beat Cielo in freestyle, while Cielo won the backstroke, until the age of 15 when Cielo decided to dedicate himself to freestyle, and the situation was reversed. Guilherme Guido focused on backstroke, and today both he and Cielo are great Brazilian and South American swimmers. He is a member of the London Roar team, competing in Season 2 of the International Swimming League (ISL). The ISL is an annual professional swimming league featuring a team-based competition format with fast-paced race sessions. Ten teams featuring the world’s best swimmers will compete for the ISL title in 2020.

== International career ==
=== 2004 ===
At 17 years old, Guido participated in his first major international tournament, the 2004 FINA World Swimming Championships (25 m), in the city of Indianapolis, in October 2004. He finished 4th in the 4×100-metre medley, breaking the South American record with a time of 3:33.02, along with César Cielo, Kaio Almeida and Eduardo Fischer. He also finished 13th in the 100-metre backstroke, 18th in the 50-metre backstroke and dropped the 200-metre backstroke.

=== 2006 ===
At the 2006 South American Games, Guido won a silver medal in the 200-metre backstroke, and a bronze medal in the 100-metre backstroke.

=== 2008 ===
At the 2008 FINA World Swimming Championships (25 m), he went to the 100-metre backstroke final, finishing in 7th place. Also ranked 10th in the 50-metre backstroke, dropped the 200-metre backstroke and was a finalist in the 4×100-metre medley ending in 6th.

In 2008 already held the South American record in the 50-meter backstroke Olympic pool, with 25.10 seconds. In May, he improved his record to 25.04 seconds.

At the 2008 Summer Olympics, Guido finished 20th in the Men's 100 metre backstroke and 14th in the Men's 4 × 100 metre medley relay.

=== 2009 ===
On May 7, 2009, at the Maria Lenk Aquatic Center, Guido got the fifth fastest time in history in the 50-metre backstroke, with 24.71 seconds.

At the 2009 World Aquatics Championships, swam the 50-metre and 100-metre backstroke but did not reach the final. At the 50-metre backstroke, broke the World Championship and South American record with a time of 24.49 seconds, at heats. He came fourth in the 4×100-metre medley with the Brazil team, in a race where the top four relays beat the world record of the United States from Beijing 2008.

On September 6, 2009, Guido broke the South American record for 100-meter backstroke, which was already his: 53.24 seconds.

On 21 November 2009, he broke the South American record for 100-meter backstroke in a short course: 49.63 seconds. On 22 November 2009, he broke the South American record for 50-meter backstroke in a short course: 23.39 seconds, beating the Venezuelan Albert Subirats's time of 23.72 seconds.

=== 2010 ===
At the 2010 South American Games, in Medellín, Guido won three gold medals in the 50-metre and 100-metre backstroke, and in the 4×100-metre medley.

He was at the 2010 Pan Pacific Swimming Championships in Irvine, where he finished 4th in the 4×100-metre medley, 8th in the 50-metre backstroke, and 8th in the 100-metre backstroke.

At the 2010 FINA World Swimming Championships (25 m), Guido, along with César Cielo, Felipe França and Kaio Almeida, hit the South American record of 4×100-metre medley with 3:23.12 time, getting the bronze medal. He also went to the 50-metre backstroke final, finishing in 6th place, and the 100-metre backstroke final, getting in 8th

=== 2011 ===
He was at the 2011 World Aquatics Championships, in Shanghai, where he finished 19th in the 50-metre backstroke, 27th in the 100-metre backstroke and 14th in the 4×100-metre medley.

At the 2011 Pan American Games, Guido won gold in the 4×100-metre medley and bronze in 100-metre backstroke.

=== 2012 ===
In August 2012, he broke the short-course South American record in 50-metre backstroke, which was already his: 23.31 seconds. His previous mark was 23.39 seconds. In November, broke the record again: 23.18 seconds.

On 7 November 2012, he broke the South American record for 50-meter backstroke in a short course: 23.18 seconds.

At the 2012 FINA World Swimming Championships (25 m), Guido won the bronze medal in the 100-metre backstroke with a time of 50.50 seconds. He also finished in 4th place in 50-metre backstroke and the 4×100-metre medley.

=== 2014 ===
At the 2014 Pan Pacific Swimming Championships in Gold Coast, Queensland, Australia, he finished 4th in the 4x100-metre medley relay, along with Marcelo Chierighini, Felipe França and Thiago Pereira, and 8th in the 100-metre backstroke.

At the 2014 FINA World Swimming Championships (25 m) in Doha, Qatar, Guido won a gold medal in the Men's 4 × 50 metre medley relay, formed by Guido, Felipe França Silva, Nicholas Santos and César Cielo, considered the "Dream Team" by Cielo (formed only by medalists or world champions in their respective individual events). Brazil won the gold shattering the world record with a time of 1:30.51. On December 7, Guido won his second gold in the Men's 4 × 100 metre medley relay, along with César Cielo, Marcos Macedo and Felipe França Silva, with a time of 3:21.14, South American record. Guido also finished 5th in the Men's 100 metre backstroke and 9th in the Men's 50 metre backstroke.

=== 2015 ===
At the 2015 Pan American Games in Toronto, Ontario, Canada, Guido won the gold medal in the 4×100-metre medley relay, where he broke the Pan American Games record with a time of 3:32.68, along with Marcelo Chierighini, Felipe França Silva and Arthur Mendes. Guido opened the relay with a time of 53.12, a new Pan Am Games and South American record in the 100-metre backstroke. Before, he had already won a silver medal in the 100-metre backstroke.

At the 2015 World Aquatics Championships in Kazan, Guido finished 14th in the Men's 100 metre backstroke. He went to the semifinals but made only a time of 53.88, far below his South American record of 53.12 obtained at the Pan American Games a few days before. In the Men's 50 metre backstroke, he finished 16th in the Heats, tied with Spanish Miguel Ortiz-Cañavate with a time of 25.29. It was established that there would be a swim-off between them; however, Guido chose not to swim the race, preferring to rest and focus on the 4 × 100 medley relay. He also finished 10th in the Men's 4 × 100 metre medley relay.

At the Open tournament held in Palhoça, Guido broke the South American record in the 100-metre backstroke with a time of 53.08.

=== 2016 ===
At the 2016 Summer Olympics, Guido finished 6th in the Men's 4 × 100 metre medley relay, and 14th in the Men's 100 metre backstroke.

=== 2017 ===
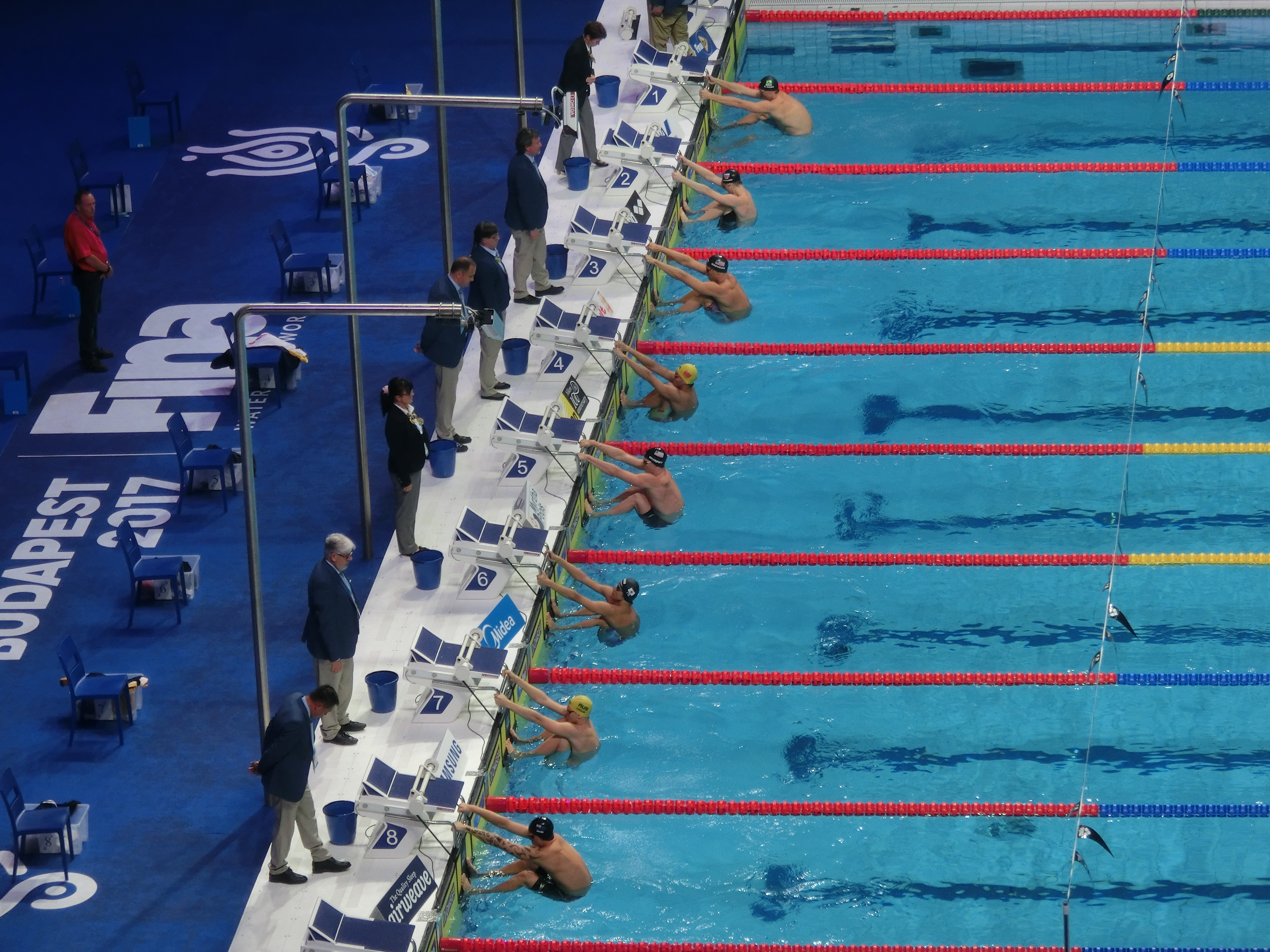
Guido in the 100 metre backstroke final at the 2017 World Aquatics Championships

At the 2017 World Aquatics Championships in Budapest, in the Men's 100 metre backstroke, he went to the first World Championship individual final of his career, finishing in 7th place. He also finished 12th in the Men's 50 metre backstroke, and 5th In the Men's 4 × 100 metre medley relay, along with Henrique Martins, João Gomes Júnior and Marcelo Chierighini.

=== 2018 ===
At the 2018 José Finkel Trophy in São Paulo, Brazil, he broke the South American record of 50-meter backstroke (22.68 seconds) and 100-meter backstroke (49.62 seconds) in short course.

At the 2018 FINA World Swimming Championships (25 m) in Hangzhou, China, Guido won a bronze medal in the Men's 4 × 50 metre medley relay, along with César Cielo, Felipe Lima and Nicholas Santos. In the Men's 4 × 100 metre medley relay, he finished 4th. In the Men's 50 metre backstroke, he finished 5th, just 0,03 seconds to win a bronze medal. In the Men's 100 metre backstroke, he broke two times the South American record in short course: 49.57 at heats and 49.45 at semifinals, finishing 5th in the final.

=== 2019 ===
At the 2019 World Aquatics Championships in Gwangju, South Korea, he reached his second World Championships final in the Men's 100 metre backstroke, finishing 7th. Guido broke the South American record at heats, with a time of 52.95. He was the first South American to swim the race under 53 seconds. In the Men's 4 × 100 metre medley relay, he finished 6th, helping Brazil qualify for the Tokyo 2020 Olympics. He also finished 9th in the Men's 50 metre backstroke.

At the 2019 Pan American Games held in Lima, Peru, he won a gold medal in the Mixed 4 × 100 metre medley relay, and a silver medal in the Men's 4 × 100 metre medley relay and in the Men's 100 metre backstroke.

== Personal bests ==
Guilherme Guido is the current holder, or former holder, of the following records:

Long Course (50 meters):

- Former South American record holder of the 50m backstroke: 24.49, time obtained on August 1, 2009
- South American record holder of the 100m backstroke: 52.95, time obtained on July 22, 2019
- South American record holder of the 4 × 100 m medley: 3:29.16, time obtained on August 2, 2009 with Henrique Barbosa, Gabriel Mangabeira and César Cielo

Short course (25 meters):

- South American record holder of the 50m backstroke: 22.55, time obtained on October 26, 2019
- South American record holder of the 100m backstroke: 48.95, time obtained on September 3, 2021
- Former World record holder of the 4x50m medley: 1:30.51, time obtained on December 4, 2014 with Felipe França Silva, Nicholas Santos and César Cielo
- South American record holder of the 4 × 100 m medley: 3:21.14, time obtained on December 7, 2014 with Felipe França Silva, Marcos Macedo and César Cielo

== See also ==
- Swimming at the 2009 World Aquatics Championships
- List of Brazilian records in swimming
- List of South American records in swimming
- List of Americas records in swimming
