= Swimming at the 2014 European Aquatics Championships – Mixed 4 × 100 metre medley relay =

Mixed 4 × 100 metre medley relay at the Swimming at the 2014 European Aquatics Championships
- Dates: 19 August
- Competitors: 53 from 9 nations
- Winning time: 3:44.02

Medalists
gold medal	Chris Walker-Hebborn; Adam Peaty; Jemma Lowe; Francesca Halsall; Georgia Davies; Ross Murdoch; Adam Barrett; Rebecca Turner	Great Britain
silver medal	Bastiaan Lijesen; Bram Dekker; Inge Dekker; Femke Heemskerk; Wendy van der Zanden; Ilse Kraaijeveld	Netherlands
bronze medal	Vladimir Mozorov; Vitalina Simonova; Viacheslav Prudnikov; Veronika Popova; Nikita Ulyanov; Grigory Falko; Svetlana Chimrova; Elizaveta Bazarova	Russia

The Mixed 4 × 100 metre medley relay competition of the 2014 European Aquatics Championships was held on 19 August.

== Records ==
Prior to the competition, the existing world, European and championship records were as follows.

	Nation	Time	Location	Date
World record	Australia	3:46.52	Perth	31 January 2014
European record	Russia	3:49.05	Dordrecht	12 July 2014

== Results ==
=== Heats ===
The heats were held at 10:38.

Rank	Heat	Lane	Nationality	Swimmers	Time	Notes
1	1	4	Italy	Christopher Ciccarese; Andrea Toniato; Ilaria Bianchi; Chiara Masini Luccetti	3:48.57	Q, ER
2	1	2	Great Britain	Georgia Davies; Ross Murdoch; Adam Barrett; Rebecca Turner	3:48.82	Q
3	2	4	Germany	Lisa Graf; Hendrik Feldwehr; Alexandra Wenk; Steffen Deibler	3:49.46	Q
4	2	3	Russia	Nikita Ulyanov; Grigory Falko; Svetlana Chimrova; Elizaveta Bazarova	3:51.94	Q
5	2	6	Netherlands	Bastiaan Lijesen; Bram Dekker; Wendy van der Zanden; Ilse Kraaijeveld	3:53.47	Q
6	2	2	Slovakia	Karin Tomečková; Tomáš Klobučník; Katarína Listopadová; Michal Navara	3:54.19	Q
7	2	5	Finland	Mimosa Jallow; Matti Mattsson; Tanja Kylliäinen; Ari-Pekka Liukkonen	3:55.45	Q
8	1	3	Austria	Jördis Steinegger; Lisa Zaiser; Filip Milcevic; Martin Spitzer	3:57.15	Q
9	1	5	Turkey	Doruk Tekin; Gizem Bozkurt; Ayşe Ezgi Yazıcı; İskender Başlakov	4:00.75	
	1	6	Czech Republic		DNS	
	2	7	France		DNS	

=== Final ===
The final was held at 19:31.

Rank	Lane	Nationality	Swimmers	Time	Notes
1st place, gold medalist(s)	5	Great Britain	Chris Walker-Hebborn (53.68); Adam Peaty (59.30); Jemma Lowe (57.51); Francesca Halsall (53.53)	3:44.02	WR, ER
2nd place, silver medalist(s)	2	Netherlands	Bastiaan Lijesen (55.19); Bram Dekker (1:01.66); Inge Dekker (56.81); Femke Heemskerk (52.27)	3:45.93	
3rd place, bronze medalist(s)	6	Russia	Vladimir Morozov (53.81); Vitalina Simonova (1:07.33); Viacheslav Prudnikov (52.58); Veronika Popova (53.62)	3:47.34	
4	3	Germany	Jenny Mensing (1:01.87); Marco Koch (59.14); Alexandra Wenk (58.64); Steffen Deibler (47.96)	3:47.61	
5	4	Italy	Luca Mencarini (54.58); Mattia Pesce (1:00.43); Elena Di Liddo (58.93); Federica Pellegrini (54.29)	3:48.23	
6	7	Slovakia	Karin Tomečková (1:04.41); Tomáš Klobučník (1:00.83); Katarína Listopadová (58.45); Michal Navara (50.80)	3:54.49	
7	1	Finland	Mimosa Jallow (1:02.25); Eetu Karvonen (1:02.11); Tanja Kylliäinen (1:00.73); Ari-Pekka Liukkonen (49.63)	3:54.72	
8	8	Austria	Joerdis Steinegger (1:03.40); Lisa Zaiser (1:09.39); Filip Milcevic (54.18); Martin Spitzer (51.46)	3:58.43	
