= Swimming at the 2016 Summer Olympics – Men's 4 × 100 metre medley relay =

Men's 4 × 100 metre medley relay at the Games of the XXXI Olympiad
- Venue: Olympic Aquatics Stadium
- Dates: 12 August 2016 (heats); 13 August 2016 (final)
- Competitors: 74 from 16 nations
- Teams: 16
- Winning time: 3:27.95 OR

Medalists
1st place, gold medalist(s)		Ryan Murphy, Cody Miller, Michael Phelps, Nathan Adrian, David Plummer*, Kevin Cordes*, Tom Shields*, Caeleb Dressel*	United States
2nd place, silver medalist(s)		Chris Walker-Hebborn, Adam Peaty, James Guy, Duncan Scott	Great Britain
3rd place, bronze medalist(s)		Mitch Larkin, Jake Packard, David Morgan, Kyle Chalmers, Cameron McEvoy*; *Indicates the swimmer only competed in the preliminary heats.	Australia

The men's 4 × 100 metre medley relay event at the 2016 Summer Olympics in Rio de Janeiro took place on 12–13 August at the Olympic Aquatics Stadium.

== Summary ==
In his final race before retirement, Michael Phelps led the U.S. men's team to a record-breaking triumph in the medley relay at the Games, finishing his career as the most decorated Olympian of all-time with his twenty-third gold medal and twenty-eighth overall. The 4 Americans Ryan Murphy (51.85), Cody Miller (59.03), Phelps (50.33), and Nathan Adrian (46.74) had a gold-medal time and a new Olympic record of 3:27.95, shaving 1.39 seconds off the previous mark from Beijing 2008 on a since-banned, high-tech bodysuit. Moreover, Murphy erased the 2009 world backstroke record (51.94) from Aaron Peirsol by nine hundredths of a second on the lead-off leg.

Breaststroke world-record holder Adam Peaty threw down the fastest breaststroke split ever in 56.59 to deliver the British team of Chris Walker-Hebborn (53.68), James Guy (51.35), and Duncan Scott (47.62) a brief lead on the second leg, before the Americans edged them out to the front at the remaining laps of the race, leaving Great Britain with a silver medal and a national record in 3:29.24. Meanwhile, Kyle Chalmers produced a sterling freestyle anchor of 46.72 to give the Australian foursome of Mitch Larkin (53.19), Jake Packard (58.84), and David Morgan (51.18) the country's bronze-medal repeat from London 2012 with a final time of 3:29.93.

Outside the podium and the 3:30 club, the Russian quartet of Evgeny Rylov (52.90), Anton Chupkov (59.10), Aleksandr Sadovnikov (52.08), and Vladimir Morozov (47.22) picked up the fourth spot in 3:31.30, with Japan's Ryosuke Irie (53.46), Yasuhiro Koseki (58.65), Takuro Fujii (51.56), and Katsumi Nakamura (48.30) following them by 67-hundredths of a second to finish fifth in 3:31.97. Brazil's Guilherme Guido (54.23), João Gomes Júnior (58.59), Henrique Martins (51.52), and Marcelo Chierighini (48.50) enjoyed racing in front of the home crowd to take the sixth spot with a 3:32.84, while Germany (3:33.50), highlighted by breaststroker and 2015 world champion Marco Koch, rounded out the championship field. China was disqualified from the race, because of an early relay takeover by butterfly swimmer Li Zhuhao.

The medals for the competition were presented by Kirsty Coventry, IOC member, Zimbabwe, and the gifts were presented by Vladimir Salnikov, bureau member of the FINA.

== Records ==
Prior to this competition, the existing world and Olympic records were as follows:

World record	United States (USA); Aaron Peirsol (52.19); Eric Shanteau (58.57); Michael Phelps (49.72); David Walters (46.80)	3:27.28	Rome, Italy	2 August 2009
Olympic record	United States; Aaron Peirsol (53.16); Brendan Hansen (59.27); Michael Phelps (50.15); Jason Lezak (46.76)	3:29.34	Beijing, China	17 August 2008

The following records were established during the competition:

Date	Event	Name	Nationality	Time	Record
13 August	Final	Ryan Murphy	United States	51.85	WR^{BK}
13 August	Final	Ryan Murphy (51.85); Cody Miller (59.03); Michael Phelps (50.33); Nathan Adrian (46.74)	United States	3:27.95	OR

BK – Backstroke lead-off leg

== Competition format ==
The competition consisted of two rounds: heats and a final. The relay teams with the best 8 times in the heats advanced to the final. Swim-offs were used as necessary to break ties for advancement to the next round.

== Results ==
=== Heats ===
A total of sixteen countries qualified to participate. The best eight from two heats advanced to the final.

Rank	Heat	Lane	Nation	Swimmers	Time	Notes
1	1	5	Great Britain	Chris Walker-Hebborn (53.68); Adam Peaty (57.49); James Guy (51.48); Duncan Scott (47.82)	3:30.47	Q, NR
2	2	4	United States	David Plummer (52.70); Kevin Cordes (59.51); Tom Shields (51.88); Caeleb Dressel (47.74)	3:31.83	Q
3	2	3	Japan	Ryosuke Irie (53.57); Yasuhiro Koseki (59.02); Takuro Fujii (51.73); Katsumi Nakamura (48.01)	3:32.33	Q
4	1	4	Australia	Mitch Larkin (53.53); Jake Packard (59.80); David Morgan (51.25); Cameron McEvoy (47.99)	3:32.57	Q
4	2	8	China	Xu Jiayu (53.45); Li Xiang (59.17); Li Zhuhao (51.81); Ning Zetao (48.14)	3:32.57	Q
6	1	2	Russia	Grigory Tarasevich (53.54); Anton Chupkov (59.39); Evgeny Koptelov (51.98); Alexander Sukhorukov (48.04)	3:32.95	Q
7	2	6	Brazil	Guilherme Guido (53.96); Felipe França Silva (59.64); Henrique Martins (51.64); Marcelo Chierighini (47.72)	3:32.96	Q
8	1	3	Germany	Jan-Philip Glania (53.86); Christian vom Lehn (1:00.17); Steffen Deibler (51.51); Damian Wierling (48.13)	3:33.67	Q
9	2	7	Hungary	Gábor Balog (54.08); Dániel Gyurta (59.91); Bence Pulai (51.82); Richárd Bohus (48.08)	3:33.89	
10	2	5	France	Camille Lacourt (53.68); Theo Bussiere (1:01.22); Jérémy Stravius (51.70); Clement Mignon (47.87)	3:34.47	
11	1	1	Italy	Simone Sabbioni (54.71); Andrea Toniato (1:00.62); Piero Codia (51.78); Luca Dotto (47.74)	3:34.85	
12	1	6	Poland	Radosław Kawęcki (54.68); Marcin Stolarski (1:00.32); Konrad Czerniak (51.82); Kacper Majchrzak (48.36)	3:35.18	
13	2	2	South Africa	Christopher Reid (54.26); Cameron van der Burgh (59.87); Dylan Bosch (52.94); Devon Brown (48.43)	3:35.50	
14	1	8	Lithuania	Danas Rapšys (54.85); Giedrius Titenis (59.68); Deividas Margevicius (53.08); Simonas Bilis (48.29)	3:35.90	
15	2	1	Greece	Apostolos Christou (54.68); Panagiotis Samilidis (1:00.87); Andreas Vazaios (53.27); Kristian Golomeev (47.93)	3:36.75	
16	1	7	Canada	Javier Acevedo (54.70); Jason Block (1:00.80); Mackenzie Darragh (53.53); Yuri Kisil (47.89)	3:36.92	

=== Final ===
Rank	Lane	Nation	Swimmers	Time	Notes
1st place, gold medalist(s)	5	United States	Ryan Murphy (51.85) WR; Cody Miller (59.03); Michael Phelps (50.33); Nathan Adrian (46.74)	3:27.95	OR
2nd place, silver medalist(s)	4	Great Britain	Chris Walker-Hebborn (53.68); Adam Peaty (56.59); James Guy (51.35); Duncan Scott (47.62)	3:29.24	NR
3rd place, bronze medalist(s)	6	Australia	Mitch Larkin (53.19); Jake Packard (58.84); David Morgan (51.18); Kyle Chalmers (46.72)	3:29.93	
4	7	Russia	Evgeny Rylov (52.90); Anton Chupkov (59.10); Aleksandr Sadovnikov (52.08); Vladimir Morozov (47.22)	3:31.30	
5	3	Japan	Ryosuke Irie (53.46); Yasuhiro Koseki (58.65); Takuro Fujii (51.56); Katsumi Nakamura (48.30)	3:31.97	
6	1	Brazil	Guilherme Guido (54.23); João Gomes Júnior (58.59); Henrique Martins (51.52); Marcelo Chierighini (48.50)	3:32.84	
7	8	Germany	Jan-Philip Glania (54.14); Marco Koch (59.63); Steffen Deibler (51.69); Damian Wierling (48.04)	3:33.50	
	2	China	Xu Jiayu (53.21); Li Xiang (58.59); Li Zhuhao; Ning Zetao	DSQ (~~3:30.70~~)	
