= Jérémy Stravius =

French swimmer (born 1988)

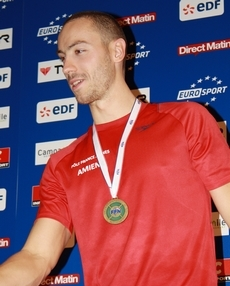
- Stravius in 2011

Personal information
- Nationality: French
- Born: 14 July 1988 (age 38) Abbeville, France
- Height: 1.90 m (6 ft 3 in)

Sport
- Sport: Swimming
- Strokes: Backstroke, butterfly, freestyle
Medal record
Men's swimming
Representing France
Event	1st	2nd	3rd
Olympic Games	1	2	0
World Championships (LC)	4	3	1
World Championships (SC)	0	2	1
European Championships (LC)	4	4	2
European Championships (SC)	8	2	2
Mediterranean Games	0	1	1
Military World Games	0	1	0
Total	17	15	7
Olympic Games
Gold medal – first place	2012 London	4×100 m freestyle
Silver medal – second place	2012 London	4×200 m freestyle
Silver medal – second place	2016 Rio de Janeiro	4×100 m freestyle
World Championships (LC)
Gold medal – first place	2011 Shanghai	100 m backstroke
Gold medal – first place	2013 Barcelona	4×100 m freestyle
Gold medal – first place	2013 Barcelona	4×100 m medley
Gold medal – first place	2015 Kazan	4×100 m freestyle
Silver medal – second place	2011 Shanghai	4×100 m freestyle
Silver medal – second place	2011 Shanghai	4×200 m freestyle
Silver medal – second place	2013 Barcelona	50 m backstroke
Bronze medal – third place	2013 Barcelona	100 m backstroke
World Championships (SC)
Silver medal – second place	2016 Windsor	50 m backstroke
Silver medal – second place	2016 Windsor	4×100 m freestyle
Bronze medal – third place	2010 Dubai	4×200 m freestyle
European Championships (LC)
Gold medal – first place	2010 Budapest	4×100 m medley
Gold medal – first place	2012 Debrecen	4×100 m freestyle
Gold medal – first place	2014 Berlin	4×100 m freestyle
Gold medal – first place	2018 Glasgow	4×100 m mixed freestyle
Silver medal – second place	2010 Budapest	100 m backstroke
Silver medal – second place	2014 Berlin	50 m backstroke
Silver medal – second place	2014 Berlin	100 m backstroke
Silver medal – second place	2014 Berlin	4×100 m medley
Bronze medal – third place	2010 Budapest	4×200 m freestyle
Bronze medal – third place	2016 London	4×100 m mixed freestyle
European Championships (SC)
Gold medal – first place	2009 Istanbul	4×50 m freestyle
Gold medal – first place	2012 Chartres	50 m backstroke
Gold medal – first place	2012 Chartres	100 m backstroke
Gold medal – first place	2012 Chartres	4×50 m freestyle
Gold medal – first place	2012 Chartres	4×50 m medley
Gold medal – first place	2012 Chartres	4×50 m mixed medley
Gold medal – first place	2013 Herning	50 m backstroke
Gold medal – first place	2013 Herning	100 m backstroke
Silver medal – second place	2012 Chartres	200 m medley
Silver medal – second place	2013 Herning	100 m butterfly
Bronze medal – third place	2017 Copenhagen	50 m backstroke
Bronze medal – third place	2017 Copenhagen	4×50 m mixed medley
Mediterranean Games
Silver medal – second place	2009 Pescara	4×200 m freestyle
Bronze medal – third place	2009 Pescara	50 m backstroke
Military World Games
Silver medal – second place	2019 Wuhan	50 m backstroke

Jérémy Stravius (born 14 July 1988) is a French swimmer, swimming freestyle, backstroke, and butterfly.

== Career ==
Stravius appeared on the world stage at the 2009 European Short Course Swimming Championships in Istanbul where he was part of the winning 4 × 50 m freestyle relay and finished in the top 8 in the 50 m breaststroke. The next year at the 2010 European Short Course Swimming Championships in Hungary, Stravius won his first medal at an international meet, winning a silver in the 100 m backstroke. At this meet, he also was part of the winning 4 × 100 m medley relay and the bronze medal winning team of the 4 × 200 m freestyle relay. Stravius won his first international gold winning the gold medal in the 100 m backstroke at the 2011 FINA World Championships in Shanghai. He shared it with countryman Camille Lacourt. He also received a silver in the 4 × 100 m freestyle relay and the 4 × 200 m freestyle relay at this meet.

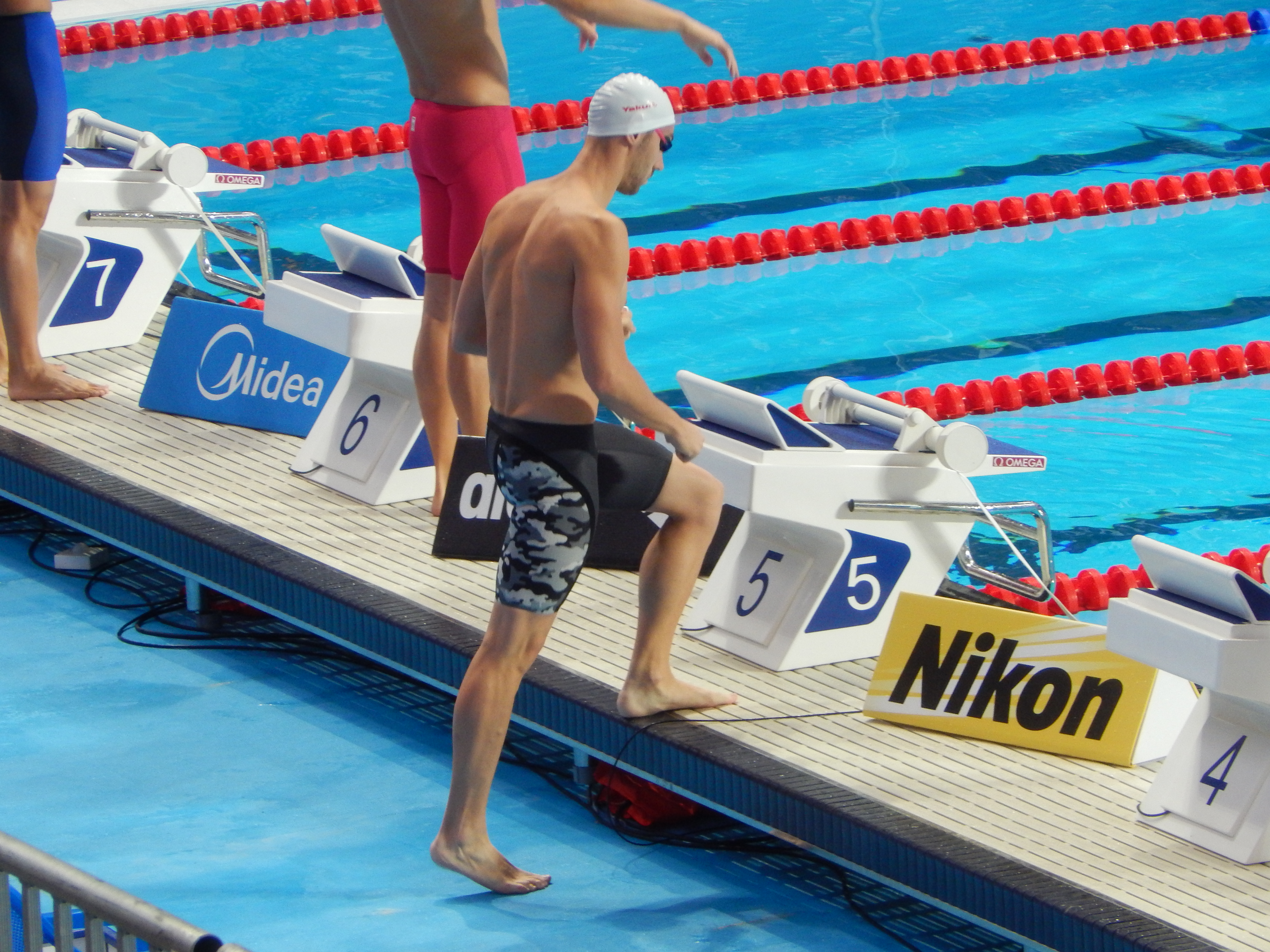
Kazan 2015

Stravius got third at the French Olympic Trials in the 100 m backstroke, just missing out on a chance to swim an individual event at the Olympics. At the 2012 Summer Olympics he won two medals, competing on the gold medal-winning 4 × 100 m freestyle relay and silver medal-winning 4 × 200 m freestyle relay teams for France, but only swimming the heats.

On 28 July 2013, at the FINA World Championships in Barcelona, Stravius was part of the winning 4 × 100 m medley relay where he swam the butterfly leg. Stravius was in the anchor position for France in the 4 × 100 m men's freestyle final. The French were the defending Olympic champions but were seeded outside the middle lanes in the final, causing Stravius to remark "On n'était pas favoris, c'est un hold up". In the final, after 200 m where France was far off from the leading three teams, Fabien Gilot exploded through with a 46.90s third leg to bring the French back into contention. Then, Stravius took over the Australians at the start of his leg and trailing the Russians and American swimmers at the midpoint of his anchor leg, Stravius snapped a precise flipturn and, after several powerful dolphin kicks underwater, emerged ahead by a hand, eventually securing the gold medal for France by 0.26s. He also won silver medals in the 50 m backstroke and the 100 m backstroke. At this meet he also swam the 200 m individual medley and the 4 × 200 m freestyle relay.

At the 2014 European Aquatics Championships in Berlin, Stravius earned two silver medals, one of them in the 50 m backstroke and the other in the 100 m backstroke. He also won a gold in the 4 × 100 m freestyle relay.

== Personal life ==
He is openly gay and was among the six French LGBT athletes featured in the documentary We Need to Talk.

Records
Preceded by Shinri Shioura, Sayaka Akase, Kenta Ito, Kanako Watanabe	Mixed 4 × 50 metres freestyle relay world record-holder 21 October 2013 – 10 November 2013; With: Florent Manaudou, Mélanie Henique, Anna Santamans	Succeeded by Tomaso D'Orsogna, Regan Leong, Bronte Campbell, Cate Campbell
