= Jan-Philip Glania =

German swimmer (born 1988)

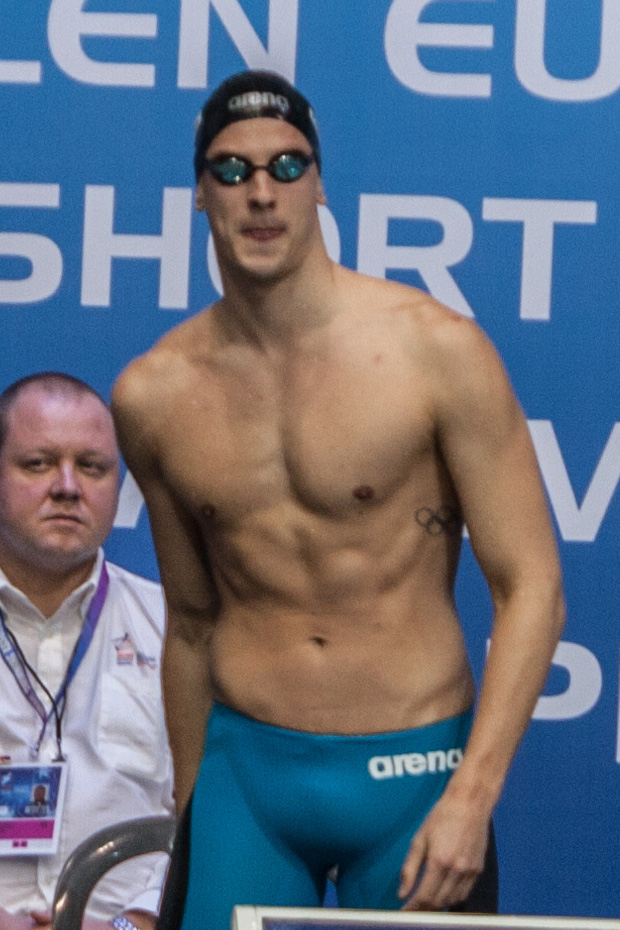
- Glania at Netanya 2015

Personal information
- Born: 8 November 1988 (age 37) Fulda, West Germany
- Height: 1.94 m (6 ft 4 in)
- Weight: 90 kg (198 lb)

Sport
- Sport: Swimming
- Strokes: Backstroke
Medal record
Men's swimming
Representing Germany
World Championships (LC)
Bronze medal – third place	2015 Kazan	4×100 m mixed medley
European Championships (LC)
Bronze medal – third place	2014 Berlin	100 m backstroke
Bronze medal – third place	2018 Glasgow	4×100 m medley

Jan-Philip Glania (born 8 November 1988) is a German swimmer who specialises in the backstroke.

At the 2012 Summer Olympics he finished 12th overall in the heats in the Men's 100 metre backstroke and 6th in the semi-final, but failed to reach the final. He also reached the semi-finals in the 200 m backstroke.

At the 2016 Summer Olympics in Rio de Janeiro, he competed in the 100 m backstroke. He finished 12th in the semifinals and did not qualify for the final. He also competed in the 200 m backstroke where he finished 9th in the semifinals and did not qualify for the final. Glania was a member of the 4 x 100 medley relay team which finished in 7th place.
