= Miguel Ortiz-Cañavate =

Spanish swimmer

Personal information
- Full name: Miguel Ortiz-Cañavate Ozeki
- Nationality: Spanish
- Born: 19 February 1991 (age 35) Madrid, Spain
- Height: 1.89 m (6 ft 2 in)
- Weight: 89 kg (196 lb)

Sport
- Sport: Swimming
- Strokes: Freestyle, backstroke, butterfly

Miguel Ortiz-Cañavate Ozeki (born 19 February 1991) is a Spanish swimmer. He competed in the men's 4 × 100 metre freestyle relay event at the 2016 Summer Olympics.
