= Noah Al-Khulaifi =

Qatari swimmer

Personal information
- Nationality: Qatar
- Born: 10 May 1999 (age 27)
- Height: 190 cm (6 ft 3 in)

Sport
- Sport: Swimming
- Strokes: backstroke
- Updated on 3 August 2017

Noah Al-Khulaifi (Arabic: نوح الخليفي, Nūh al-Khulayfī; born on 10 May 1999) is a Qatari swimmer. He competed at the 2016 Summer Olympics in the men's 100 metre backstroke event; his time of 1:07.47 in the heats did not qualify him for the semifinals.
