= Juan Miguel Rando =

Spanish swimmer

Personal information
- Full name: Juan Miguel Rando Gálvez
- Born: 26 March 1988 (age 38) Santa Coloma de Gramenet, Spain

Sport
- Sport: Swimming
- Strokes: Backstroke
Medal record
Men's swimming
Representing Spain
Universiade
Silver medal – second place	2011 Shenzhen	100 m backstroke

Juan Miguel Rando Gálvez (Santa Coloma de Gramenet, 26 March 1988) is a Spanish swimmer. At the 2012 Summer Olympics he finished 25th overall in the heats in the Men's 100 metre backstroke and failed to reach the semifinals.
