= Timothy Wynter =

Jamaican swimmer (born 1996)

Personal information
- National team: Jamaica
- Born: 16 January 1996 (age 30) Kingston, Jamaica

Sport
- Sport: Swimming
- College team: USC Men's Swimming and Diving

Timothy Wynter (born 16 January 1996) is a Jamaican swimmer. He competed in the men's 100 metre backstroke event at the 2016 Summer Olympics. Wynter attended Phillips Academy. He was on the USC swim team and majored in psychology. He also set the Jamaican national record for 50m and 100m backstroke in 2016.
