= Bastiaan Lijesen =

Dutch swimmer (born 1990)

Personal information
- Born: 28 December 1990 (age 35) Nieuwerkerk aan den IJssel, Netherlands
Medal record
Men's swimming
Representing Netherlands
European Championships
Silver medal – second place	2014 Berlin	4x100 m mixed medley

Bastiaan Lijesen (born 28 December 1990) is a Dutch former swimmer. At the 2012 Summer Olympics he finished 23rd overall in the heats in the Men's 100 metre backstroke and failed to reach the semifinals.
