= Christopher Courtis =

Barbadian swimmer (born 1994)

Personal information
- Born: 13 February 1994 (age 32)

Sport
- Sport: Swimming

Christopher Courtis (born 13 February 1994) is a Barbadian swimmer. He competed in the men's 50 metre backstroke event at the 2017 World Aquatics Championships.
