= Russell Wood (swimmer) =

Canadian swimmer

Personal information
- Born: May 4, 1994 (age 32) Calgary, Alberta, Canada
- Height: 185 cm (6 ft 1 in)

Sport
- Sport: Swimming
- Club: University of Calgary Swim Club
- Coach: Mike Blondal
Medal record
Representing Canada
Pan American Games
Bronze medal – third place	2015 Toronto	4×100 m medley

Russell Wood (born May 4, 1994) is a Canadian backstroke distance swimmer.
