= Chris Walker-Hebborn =

British swimmer (born 1990)

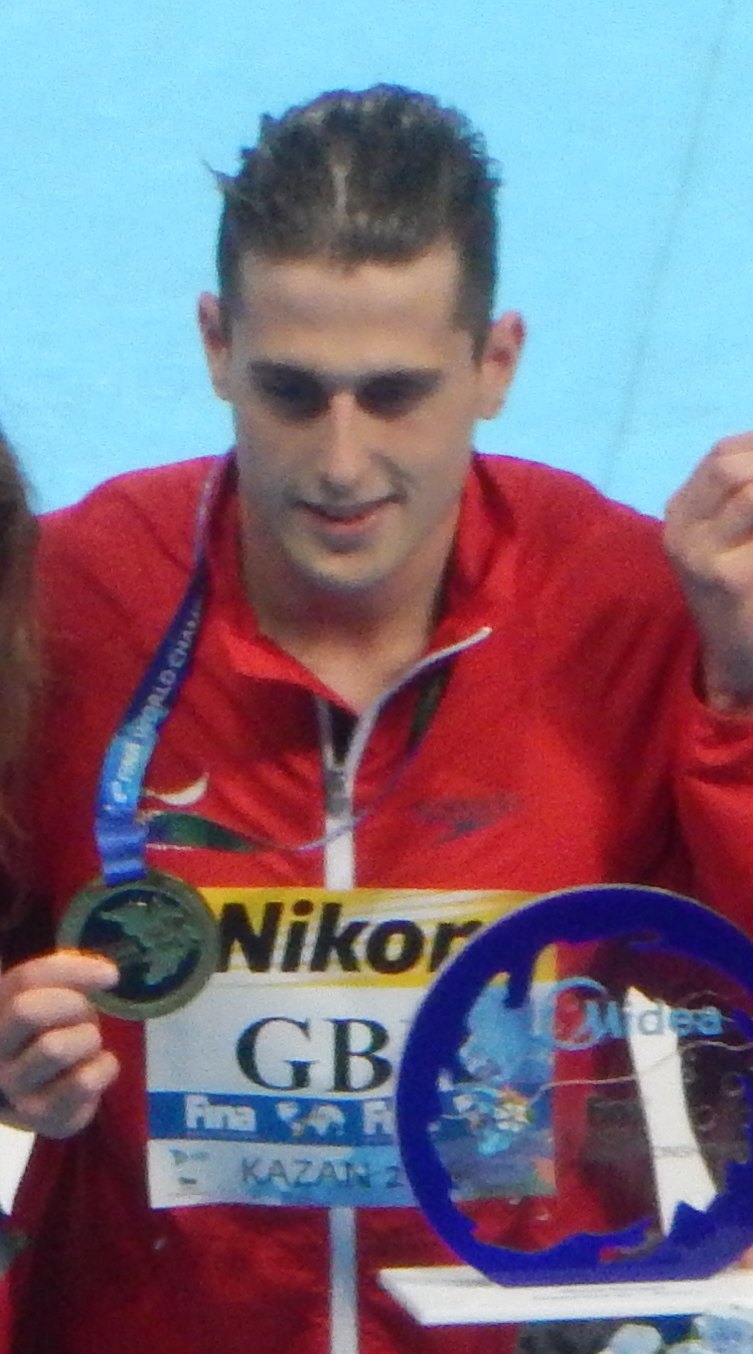
- Walker-Hebborn in 2015

Personal information
- Full name: Christopher James Walker-Hebborn
- Nickname: "Chris"
- National team: Great Britain
- Born: 1 July 1990 (age 36) Enfield, London, England
- Height: 1.84 m (6 ft 0 in)
- Weight: 80 kg (176 lb)

Sport
- Sport: Swimming
- Strokes: Backstroke
- Club: University of Bath
Medal record
Men's swimming
Representing Great Britain
Olympic Games
Silver medal – second place	2016 Rio de Janeiro	4×100 m medley
World Championships (LC)
Gold medal – first place	2015 Kazan	4×100 m mixed medley
Silver medal – second place	2017 Budapest	4x100 m medley
World Championships (SC)
Silver medal – second place	2014 Doha	4×50 m mixed medley
European Championships
Gold medal – first place	2014 Berlin	100 m backstroke
Gold medal – first place	2014 Berlin	4×100 m medley
Gold medal – first place	2014 Berlin	4×100 m mixed medley
Gold medal – first place	2016 London	4×100 m medley
Gold medal – first place	2016 London	4×100 m mixed medley
Bronze medal – third place	2014 Berlin	50 m backstroke
European Championships (SC)
Silver medal – second place	2013 Herning	100 m backstroke
Silver medal – second place	2015 Netanya	50 m backstroke
Bronze medal – third place	2015 Netanya	100 m backstroke
Representing England
Commonwealth Games
Gold medal – first place	2014 Glasgow	100 m backstroke
Gold medal – first place	2014 Glasgow	4×100 m medley
Bronze medal – third place	2010 Delhi	4×100 m medley
Bronze medal – third place	2014 Glasgow	4×100 m freestyle

Christopher James Walker-Hebborn (born 1 July 1990) is an English swimmer who competed for Great Britain at the 2012 Summer Olympics and the 2016 Summer Olympics, winning a silver medal at the latter.

A successful youth and junior athlete, Walker-Hebborn achieved a breakout year in 2014, winning two Commonwealth Games titles and three European Championship titles, including the Commonwealth Games and European Championships 100-metre backstroke gold medals.

A key member of the England and Great Britain medley relay teams, he formed part of the world record breaking, world title winning Great Britain mixed medley team at the 2015 World Aquatics Championships. He also won gold medals as part of the England men's medley relay at the 2014 Commonwealth Games, and both men's and mixed medlay relay teams at the 2014 European Aquatics Championships, again with Great Britain. In 2016 he was part of the Great Britain team to retain both the men's and mixed medley relay titles, his fourth and fifth European golds. At the 2016 Rio Olympics he won a silver medal as part of the men's 4 × 100 m medley relay.

== Early career ==
He is currently based at the University of Bath, where he trains at one of British Swimming's Intensive Training Centres. As a teenager he spent two years at the British Offshore Centre in Australia at The Southport School, from 2006 to 2008.

In March 2009, he qualified for his first senior World Championships after beating event favourite James Goddard in the 200 m backstroke at the British Championships, held in Sheffield.

Walker-Hebborn's preliminary heat performance in Rome secured him a place in the semifinals where, as one of the few swimmers not wearing the controversial full body suit. This is when he set a new British record to become a finalist. The record was to stand only briefly, as he broke it again in the finals (1:56.05), placing 9th.

He was offered a scholarship at Florida State University in January 2009 but returned to his Bury St. Edmunds home after just a few weeks due to lack of long course training.

== Later career ==
At the 2012 Summer Olympics, he competed in the men's 100 and 200 m backstroke, finishing in 20th and 22nd respectively.

In 2014, he won gold at the Commonwealth Games in the 100 m backstroke, in a new Games record of 53.12 seconds. He was also part of the English 4 × 100 m medley relay team that won gold in a Games record, and the 4 × 100 m freestyle team that won bronze.

At the 2016, he teamed with Adam Peaty, James Guy and Duncan Scott in the GB team that won a silver medal in the men's 4 × 100 m medley relay at the 2016 Summer Olympics. He also finished in 11th in the men's 100 m backstroke.

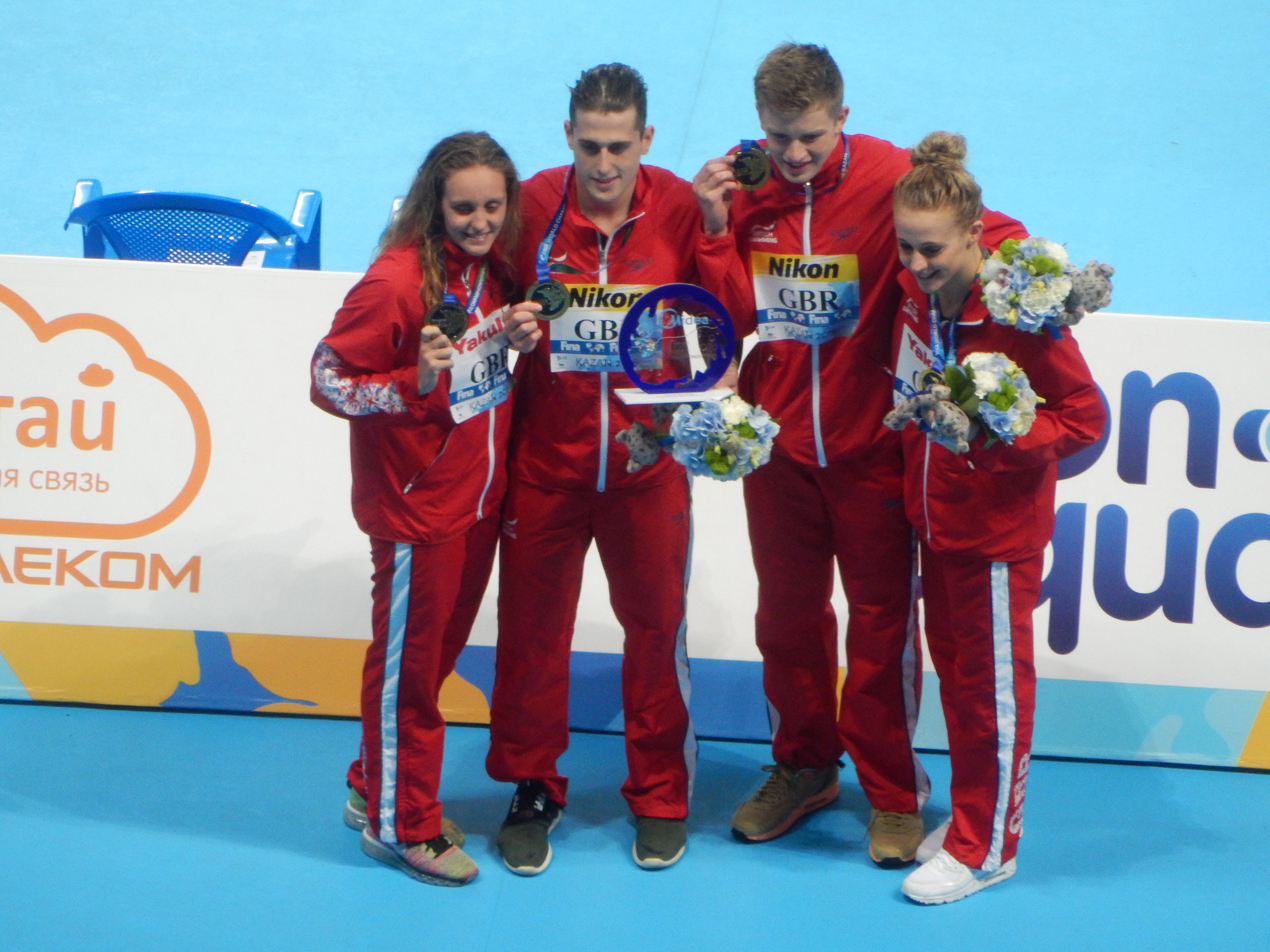
Chris Walker-Hebborn with the gold-winning team in 4 × 100 m mixed medley at the 2015 Kazan World Championship

== Competition results ==
International competition	Event	Time	Position
World Championships 2009	200 m backstroke	1:56.05 (former NR)	9th

Domestic competition	Event	Time	Position
British Championships 2014	100 m backstroke	53.82	GOLD
British Championships 2014	50 m backstroke	25.09	GOLD
British Championships 2011	100 m backstroke	55.41	SILVER
British Championships 2011	200 m backstroke	2:01.94	BRONZE
British Championships 2010	200 m backstroke	1:57.39	SILVER
British Championships 2010	100 m backstroke	54.78	SILVER
British Championships 2010	200 m freestyle	1:49.98	6th
British Championships 2009	200 m backstroke	1:57.95	GOLD
British Championships 2009	100 m backstroke	54.96	SILVER
British Championships 2009	200 m freestyle	1:48.99	5th
