= Viktar Staselovich =

Belarusian swimmer

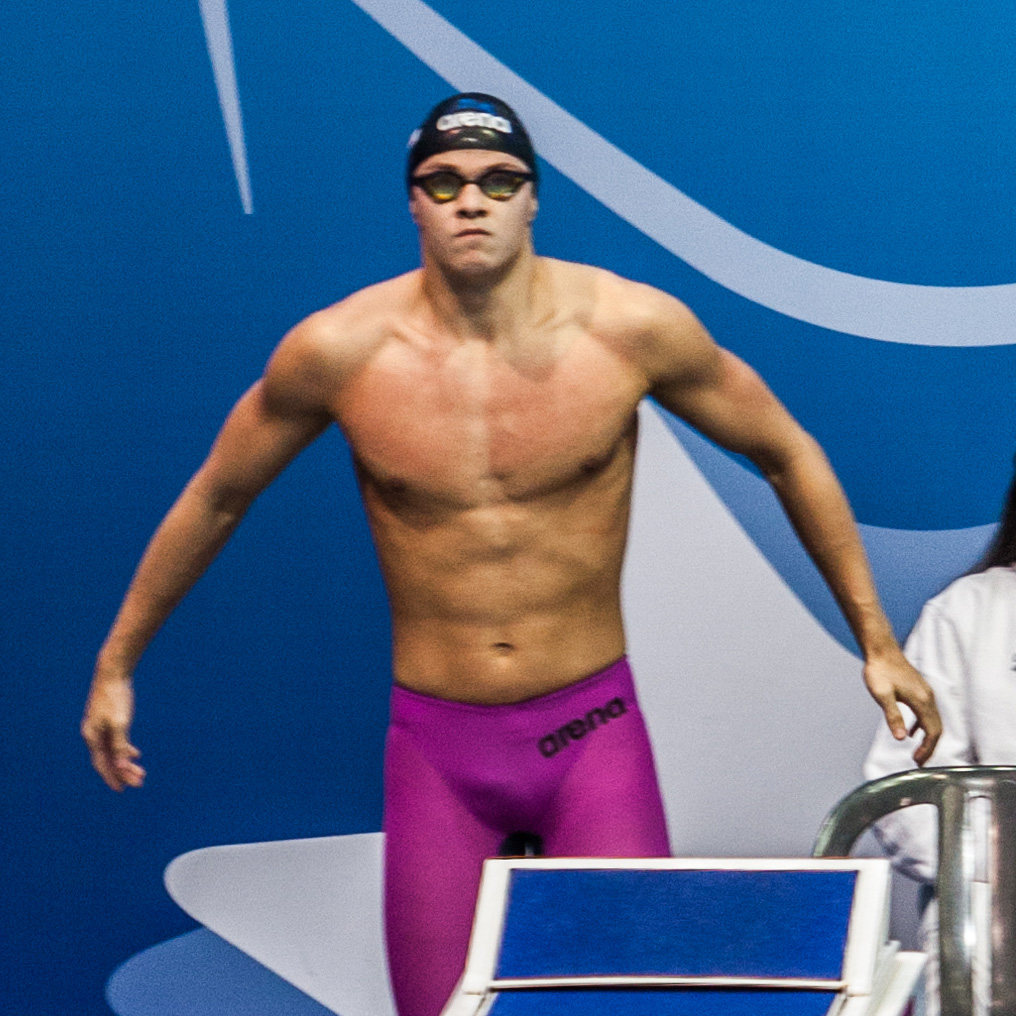
- Viktar Staselovich in 2015

Personal information
- Born: 28 May 1994 (age 32)

Sport
- Sport: Swimming
Medal record
European Championships (SC)
Bronze medal – third place	2019 Glasgow	4×50 m medley
Bronze medal – third place	2015 Netanya	4×50 m medley
Bronze medal – third place	2015 Netanya	4×50 m freestyle

Viktar Staselovich (born 28 May 1994) is a Belarusian swimmer. He competed in the men's 100 metre backstroke event at the 2016 Summer Olympics.
