= Boris Kirillov =

Azerbaijani swimmer

Personal information
- Full name: Boris Kirillov
- Nationality: Azerbaijani
- Born: 4 August 1992 (age 33)

Sport
- Sport: Swimming
- Strokes: Backstroke
Medal record
Representing Azerbaijan
Swimming
Islamic Solidarity Games
Gold medal – first place	2013 Palembang	200 m backstroke

Boris Kirillov (born 4 August 1992) is an Azerbaijani swimmer. He competed in the men's 200 metre backstroke event at the 2016 Summer Olympics, but did not advance beyond the heats.
