= Lavrans Solli =

Norwegian swimmer (born 1992)

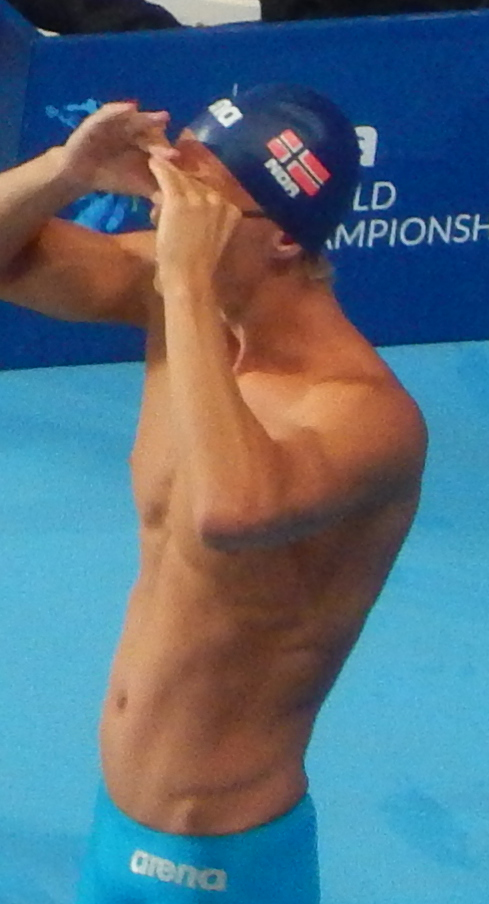

Personal information
- Born: 21 February 1992 (age 34) Oslo, Norway

Sport
- Sport: Swimming
Medal record
Men's swimming
Representing Norway
European Championships (SC)
Bronze medal – third place	2012 Chartres	4×50 m mixed medley

Lavrans Solli (born 21 February 1992) is a Norwegian backstroke swimmer. He was born in Oslo. He competed at the 2012 Summer Olympics in London. In 2012, he also won a bronze medal in the mixed 4 x 50 m relay at the European Short Course Championships.

As of July 2025, he holds the Norwegian record for 50 m backstroke (set at the 2015 World Championship), 100 m and 200 m (also set at the 2015 World Championship) backstroke in the long course, the short course 50 m backstroke, set at the 2014 World Short Course Championships. He was also part of the team that holds the Norwegian 4 × 100 m freestyle record (set at the 2012 European Championship).
