= Hamdan Bayusuf =

Kenyan swimmer (born 1994)

Personal information
- Born: September 29, 1994 (age 31)

Sport
- Sport: Swimming
- Strokes: Backstroke

Hamdan Bayusuf (born September 29, 1994) is a Kenyan swimmer. He competed at the 2016 Summer Olympics in the men's 100 metre backstroke event; his time of 1:00.28 in the heats did not qualify him for the semifinals.

He also competed at the 2015 African Games.
