= 2018 FINA World Swimming Championships (25 m) – Men's 4 × 50 metre freestyle relay =

Men's 4 × 50 metre freestyle relay at the 2018 FINA World Swimming Championships (25 m)
- Venue: Hangzhou Sports Park Stadium
- Dates: 14 December (heats and final)
- Competitors: 57 from 13 nations
- Teams: 13
- Winning time: 1:21.80 WR

Medalists
gold medal	Caeleb Dressel; Ryan Held; Jack Conger; Michael Chadwick; Michael Andrew; Michael Jensen; Kyle DeCoursey	United States
silver medal	Vladimir Morozov; Evgeny Sedov; Ivan Kuzmenko; Evgeny Rylov; Kliment Kolesnikov; Sergey Fesikov	Russia
bronze medal	Santo Condorelli; Andrea Vergani; Lorenzo Zazzeri; Alessandro Miressi	Italy

The men's 4 × 50 metre freestyle relay competition of the 2018 FINA World Swimming Championships (25 m) was held on 14 December 2018.

== Records ==
Prior to the competition, the existing world and championship records were as follows.

	Name	Nation	Time	Location	Date
World record	Vladimir Morozov (21.01); Evgeny Sedov (20.37); Oleg Tikhobaev (20.59); Sergei Fesikov (20.63)	Russia	1:22.60	Doha, Qatar	6 December 2014
Championship record	Vladimir Morozov (21.01); Evgeny Sedov (20.37); Oleg Tikhobaev (20.59); Sergei Fesikov (20.63)	Russia	1:22.60	Doha, Qatar	6 December 2014

The following records were established during the competition:

Date	Event	Name	Nation	Time	Record
14 December	Final	Caeleb Dressel (20.43); Ryan Held (20.25); Jack Conger (20.59); Michael Chadwick (20.53)	United States	1:21.80	WR

== Results ==
=== Heats ===
The heats were started at 09:32.

Rank	Heat	Lane	Nation	Swimmers	Time	Notes
1	1	4	Italy	Santo Condorelli (21.32); Andrea Vergani (20.80); Lorenzo Zazzeri (20.99); Alessandro Miressi (20.99)	1:24.10	Q
2	2	4	Russia	Kliment Kolesnikov (21.55); Ivan Kuzmenko (20.87); Evgeny Sedov (20.80); Sergey Fesikov (20.96)	1:24.18	Q
3	1	2	United States	Michael Andrew (21.33); Michael Jensen (21.23); Kyle DeCoursey (21.31); Jack Conger (20.79)	1:24.66	Q
4	2	5	Australia	Grayson Bell (21.65); Cameron McEvoy (21.06); Cameron Jones (20.93); Louis Townsend (21.24)	1:24.88	Q
5	1	6	South Africa	Brad Tandy (21.16); Chad le Clos (20.96); Douglas Erasmus (21.44); Ryan Coetzee (21.54)	1:25.10	Q, AF
6	2	2	Belarus	Hryhory Pekarski (21.74); Yauhen Tsurkin (21.09); Viktar Staselovich (21.51); Artsiom Machekin (21.15)	1:25.49	Q
7	1	5	Japan	Kosuke Matsui (21.41); Katsumi Nakamura (21.00); Kaiya Seki (22.01); Takeshi Kawamoto (21.40)	1:25.82	Q
8	1	2	Germany	Marius Kusch (21.69); Christian Diener (21.66); Damian Wierling (21.32); Ramon Klenz (21.55)	1:26.22	Q
9	2	6	Turkey	Hüseyin Emre Sakçı (21.52); Iskender Baslakov (21.74); Yalım Acımış (21.74); Kemal Arda Gürdal (21.25)	1:26.25	NR
10	2	5	China	Yu Hexin (22.11); Cao Jiwen (21.88); He Junyi (21.70); Hou Yujie (21.59)	1:27.28	
11	2	7	Romania	George Rațiu (22.50); Cătălin Ungur (22.17); Daniel Martin (21.70); Thierry Bollin (21.59)	1:27.96	
12	2	1	Switzerland	Ivo Staub (22.23); Nils Liess (21.86); Manuel Leuthard (22.06); Thierry Bollin (22.13)	1:28.28	
13	1	3	Chinese Taipei	Wu Chun-feng (22.02) NR; Chuang Mu-lun (22.13); Huang Yen-hsin (22.33); Lin Chien-liang (22.00)	1:28.48	
	1	7	Brazil		DNS	
	2	7	Portugal		DNS	

=== Final ===
The final was held at 19:00.

Rank	Lane	Nation	Swimmers	Time	Notes
1st place, gold medalist(s)	3	United States	Caeleb Dressel (20.43) AM; Ryan Held (20.25); Jack Conger (20.59); Michael Chadwick (20.53)	1:21.80	WR
2nd place, silver medalist(s)	5	Russia	Vladimir Morozov (20.39); Evgeny Sedov (20.82); Ivan Kuzmenko (20.64); Evgeny Rylov (20.37)	1:22.22	NR
3rd place, bronze medalist(s)	4	Italy	Santo Condorelli (21.27); Andrea Vergani (20.44); Lorenzo Zazzeri (20.57); Alessandro Miressi (20.62)	1:22.90	NR
4	6	Australia	Cameron McEvoy (21.09); Cameron Jones (20.75); Grayson Bell (20.95); Louis Townsend (21.13)	1:23.92	OC
5	2	South Africa	Brad Tandy (21.22); Chad le Clos (20.31); Douglas Erasmus (21.29); Ryan Coetzee (21.32)	1:24.14	AF
6	1	Japan	Katsumi Nakamura (21.16) AS; Kosuke Matsui (21.01); Takeshi Kawamoto (21.06); Kaiya Seki (21.46)	1:24.69	
7	8	Germany	Marius Kusch (21.47); Damian Wierling (21.07); Ramon Klenz (21.51); Christian Diener (21.49)	1:25.54	
	7	Belarus	Hryhory Pekarski (21.79); Yauhen Tsurkin (21.17); Viktar Staselovich; Artsiom Machekin	DSQ	
