= 2018 FINA World Swimming Championships (25 m) – Mixed 4 × 50 metre freestyle relay =

Mixed 4 × 50 metre freestyle relay at the 2018 FINA World Swimming Championships (25 m)
- Venue: Hangzhou Sports Park Stadium
- Dates: 12 December (heats and final)
- Nations: 47
- Winning time: 1:27.89 WR

Medalists
gold medal	Caeleb Dressel; Ryan Held; Mallory Comerford; Kelsi Dahlia; Michael Andrew; Michael Chadwick; Olivia Smoliga; Madison Kennedy	United States
silver medal	Jesse Puts; Stan Pijnenburg; Ranomi Kromowidjojo; Femke Heemskerk; Kim Busch; Valerie van Roon	Netherlands
bronze medal	Vladimir Morozov; Evgeny Sedov; Maria Kameneva; Rozaliya Nasretdinova; Evgeny Rylov; Ivan Kuzmenko; Arina Surkova	Russia

The mixed 4 × 50 metre freestyle relay competition of the 2018 FINA World Swimming Championships (25 m) was held on 12 December 2018.

== Records ==
Prior to the competition, the existing world and championship records were as follows.

	Name	Nation	Time	Location	Date
World record	Nyls Korstanje (21.42); Kyle Stolk (20.66); Ranomi Kromowidjojo (23.01); Femke Heemskerk (23.30)	Netherlands	1:28.39	Copenhagen	16 December 2017
Championship record	Josh Schneider (20.94); Matt Grevers (20.75); Madison Kennedy (23.63); Abbey Weitzeil (23.25)	United States	1:28.57	Doha, Qatar	6 December 2014

The following records were established during the competition:

Date	Event	Name	Nation	Time	Record
14 December	Final	Caeleb Dressel (20.43); Ryan Held (20.60); Mallory Comerford (23.44); Kelsi Dahlia (23.42)	United States	1:27.89	WR

== Results ==
=== Heats ===
The heats were started at 11:07.

Rank	Heat	Lane	Nation	Swimmers	Time	Notes
1	5	5	United States	Michael Andrew (21.13); Michael Chadwick (20.66); Olivia Smoliga (23.87); Madison Kennedy (24.14)	1:29.80	Q
2	4	4	Russia	Evgeny Rylov (21.21); Ivan Kuzmenko (20.67); Arina Surkova (24.05); Rozaliya Nasretdinova (24.03)	1:29.96	Q
3	5	3	Australia	Cameron McEvoy (21.10); Cameron Jones (21.06); Holly Barratt (23.85); Emily Seebohm (24.11)	1:30.12	Q
4	3	5	Japan	Kosuke Matsui (21.20); Katsumi Nakamura (21.05); Aya Sato (24.00); Runa Imai (24.07)	1:30.32	Q
5	5	4	Netherlands	Jesse Puts (21.42); Stan Pijnenburg (21.23); Kim Busch (23.85); Valerie van Roon (24.06)	1:30.56	Q
6	5	0	Brazil	Marcelo Chierighini (21.64); Matheus Santana (21.42); Larissa Oliveira (24.25); Etiene Medeiros (23.47)	1:30.78	Q
7	4	9	Finland	Andrei Tuomola (22.10); Ari-Pekka Liukkonen (20.91); Jenna Laukkanen (24.34); Mimosa Jallow (24.16)	1:31.51	Q
8	3	4	Italy	Santo Condorelli (21.30); Andrea Vergani (20.98); Elena Di Liddo (24.58); Federica Pellegrini (25.02)	1:31.88	Q
9	4	3	Belarus	Artsiom Machekin (21.73); Viktar Staselovich (21.33); Anastasiya Shkurdai (24.52); Nastassia Karakouskaya (24.34)	1:31.92	R
10	2	6	Germany	Damian Wierling (21.75); Marius Kusch (21.49); Jessica Steiger (24.26); Annika Bruhn (24.84)	1:32.34	R
11	4	5	China	Hou Yujie (22.23); Cao Jiwen (22.11); Wu Yue (23.76); Yang Junxuan (24.71)	1:32.81	
12	5	6	Turkey	Hüseyin Emre Sakçı (21.54); Kemal Arda Gürdal (21.35); Selen Özbilen (25.03); Ekaterina Avramova (25.00)	1:32.92	
13	4	6	South Africa	Douglas Erasmus (21.87); Brad Tandy (20.98); Erin Gallagher (24.50); Rebecca Meder (25.86)	1:33.21	
14	2	5	New Zealand	Daniel Hunter (21.95); Wilrich Coetzee (22.08); Rebecca Moynihan (25.04); Paige Flynn (25.07)	1:34.14	
15	3	3	Hong Kong	Kenneth To (21.64); Stephanie Au (24.99); Sze Hang Yu (25.05); Cheuk Ming Ho (22.99)	1:34.67	
16	3	6	Chinese Taipei	Wu Chun-feng (22.09); Lin Chien-liang (22.11); Huang Mei-chien (25.16); Lin Pei-wun (25.50)	1:34.86	
17	3	9	Bosnia and Herzegovina	Nikola Bjelajac (22.68); Adi Mešetović (21.91); Amina Kajtaz (26.15); Lamija Medošević (25.42)	1:36.16	
18	1	2	Slovakia	Ádám Halás (22.77); Marek Botík (23.26); Barbora Mikuskova (25.41); Karolina Hájková (24.78)	1:36.22	
19	1	5	Latvia	Ģirts Feldbergs (22.68); Daniils Bobrovs (23.65); Ieva Maļuka (25.67); Gabriela Ņikitina (24.71)	1:36.71	
20	2	1	South Korea	Kang Ji-seok (23.15); Lee Ju-ho (23.61); Ko Miso (25.67); Park Ye-rin (25.98)	1:38.41	
21	2	0	Mauritius	Bradley Vincent (22.01); Mathieu Marquet (23.81); Elodie Poo-cheong (26.70); Camille Koenig (27.26)	1:39.78	
22	4	2	Armenia	Vladimir Mamikonyan (23.62); Ani Poghosyan (27.56); Artur Barseghyan (22.38); Varsenik Manucharyan (27.17)	1:40.73	
23	3	2	Seychelles	Dean Hoffman (23.88); Felicity Passon (26.05); Therese Soukup (27.44); Samuele Rossi (23.67)	1:41.04	
24	3	1	Andorra	Bernat Lomero (24.29); Patrick Pelegrina Cuén (23.81); Mónica Ramírez (26.90); Nàdia Tudó Cubells (26.81)	1:41.81	
25	5	8	Moldova	Dan Siminel (23.67); Nichita Bortnicov (24.68); Tatiana Chișca (27.22); Tatiana Salcuțan (26.30)	1:41.87	
26	5	9	Macau	Chao Man Hou (23.37); Lin Sizhuang (23.39); Tan Chi Yan (27.79); Cheang Weng Lam (27.61)	1:42.16	
27	5	2	Singapore	Malcolm Low (24.27); Ardi Zulhilmi Mohamed Azman (25.12); Rachel Tseng (26.33); Nicholle Toh (26.78)	1:42.50	
28	1	1	Panama	Isaac Beitia (23.08); Nimia Murua (27.26); María Castillo (28.32); Édgar Crespo (24.24)	1:42.90	
28	3	8	Mongolia	Myagmaryn Delgerkhüü (24.34); Batbayaryn Enkhkhüslen (26.69); Enkhzul Khuyagbaatar (27.81); Zandanbal Gunsennorov (24.06)	1:42.90	
30	2	9	Nicaragua	María Hernández (27.12); Eisner Barberena (23.85); Karla Abarca (27.54); Kener Torrez (24.64)	1:43.15	
31	5	1	Costa Rica	Beatriz Padrón (26.52); Daniela Alfaro (28.21); Arnoldo Herrera (24.38); Bryan Alvaréz (24.34)	1:43.45	
32	1	7	Antigua and Barbuda	Stefano Mitchell (23.39); Olivia Fuller (27.98); Bianca Mitchell (28.82); Noah Mascoll-Gomes (23.34)	1:43.53	
33	3	7	Jordan	Mohammed Bedour (23.28); Amro Al-Wir (24.69); Lara Aklouk (29.31); Leedia Alsafadi (27.89)	1:45.17	
34	5	7	Mozambique	Ludovico Corsini (25.04); Jannat Bique (28.74); Alicia Mateus (29.14); Igor Mogne (24.20)	1:47.12	
35	2	2	Madagascar	Heriniavo Rasolonjatovo (24.67); Lalanomena Andrianirina (25.20); Tiana Rabarijaona (28.52); Samantha Rakotovelo (29.89)	1:48.28	
36	4	8	Papua New Guinea	Leonard Kalate (24.43); Josh Tarere (24.83); Georgia-Leigh Vele (28.32); Rehema Kalate (30.82)	1:48.40	
37	2	7	Tonga	Charissa Panuve (30.17); Finau Ohuafi (25.48); Noelani Day (29.40); Amini Fonua (23.37)	1:48.42	
38	2	8	Guam	Benjamin Schulte (23.62); Amanda Joy Poppe (31.01); Mineri Kurotori Gomez (29.53); James Hendrix (24.92)	1:49.08	
39	1	6	Turks and Caicos Islands	Arleigha Hall (27.37); Jack Parlee (27.48); Alex Maclaren (31.49); Luke Haywood (25.77)	1:52.11	
40	2	4	Tajikistan	Olimjon Ishanov (25.85); Karina Klimyk (32.00); Fakhriddin Madkamov (27.29); Anastasiya Tyurina (29.39)	1:54.53	
41	4	1	Maldives	Aishath Sausan (31.25); Mubal Azzam Ibrahim (27.35); Hamna Ahmed (32.35); Imaan Ali (26.75)	1:57.70	
	1	3	Sierra Leone		DNS	
	1	4	Kenya	Ridhwan Mohamed; Rebecca Kamau; Imara-Bella Thorpe; Danilo Rosafio	DNS	
	2	3	Venezuela		DNS	
	4	0	Benin		DNS	
	4	7	Senegal		DNS	
	3	0	Switzerland	Manuel Leuthard (22.74); Ivo Staub; Alexandra Touretski; Svenja Stoffel	DSQ	

=== Final ===
The final was held at 20:44.

Rank	Lane	Nation	Swimmers	Time	Notes
1st place, gold medalist(s)	4	United States	Caeleb Dressel (20.43); Ryan Held (20.60); Mallory Comerford (23.44); Kelsi Dahlia (23.42)	1:27.89	WR
2nd place, silver medalist(s)	2	Netherlands	Jesse Puts (21.17); Stan Pijnenburg (21.18); Ranomi Kromowidjojo (23.09); Femke Heemskerk (23.07)	1:28.51	
3rd place, bronze medalist(s)	5	Russia	Vladimir Morozov (20.75); Evgeny Sedov (20.66); Maria Kameneva (23.66); Rozaliya Nasretdinova (23.66)	1:28.73	
4	6	Japan	Katsumi Nakamura (21.03); Kosuke Matsui (20.90); Aya Sato (23.62); Runa Imai (23.96)	1:29.51	
5	7	Brazil	Matheus Santana (21.35); César Cielo (20.80); Larissa Oliveira (24.45); Etiene Medeiros (23.31)	1:29.91	
6	3	Australia	Cameron McEvoy (21.04); Cameron Jones (21.11); Holly Barratt (23.90); Emily Seebohm (24.04)	1:30.09	
7	8	Italy	Santo Condorelli (21.09); Andrea Vergani (21.06); Federica Pellegrini (24.70); Elena Di Liddo (24.11)	1:30.96	
8	1	Finland	Andrei Tuomola (22.26); Ari-Pekka Liukkonen (20.84); Jenna Laukkanen (24.06); Mimosa Jallow (24.07)	1:31.23	
