= 2018 FINA World Swimming Championships (25 m) – Men's 4 × 100 metre freestyle relay =

Men's 4 × 100 metre freestyle relay at the 2018 FINA World Swimming Championships (25 m)
- Venue: Hangzhou Sports Park Stadium
- Dates: 11 December (heats and final)
- Competitors: 62 from 13 nations
- Teams: 13
- Winning time: 3:03.03 WR

Medalists
gold medal	Caeleb Dressel; Blake Pieroni; Michael Chadwick; Ryan Held; Kyle DeCoursey; Michael Jensen; Matt Grevers	United States
silver medal	Vladislav Grinev; Sergey Fesikov; Vladimir Morozov; Kliment Kolesnikov; Evgeny Rylov; Ivan Kuzmenko; Mikhail Vekovishchev; Ivan Girev	Russia
bronze medal	Matheus Santana; Marcelo Chierighini; César Cielo; Breno Correia	Brazil

The Men's 4 × 100 metre freestyle relay competition of the 2018 FINA World Swimming Championships (25 m) was held on 11 December 2018.

== Records ==
Prior to the competition, the existing world and championship records were as follows.

	Nation	Time	Location	Date
World record	United States	3:03.30	Manchester	19 December 2009
Championship record	France	3:03.78	Doha	3 December 2014

The following new records were set during this competition

Date	Event	Nation	Time	Record
11 December	Final	United States	3:03.03	WR

== Results ==
=== Heats ===
The heats were started on 11 December at 12:37.

Rank	Heat	Lane	Nation	Swimmers	Time	Notes
1	1	4	Russia	Evgeny Rylov (46.09); Ivan Kuzmenko (46.58); Mikhail Vekovishchev (46.32); Ivan Girev (46.17)	3:05.16	Q
2	1	7	Brazil	Matheus Santana (47.41); Marcelo Chierighini (46.52); Breno Correia (45.32); César Cielo (46.45)	3:05.70	Q, SA
3	1	6	United States	Ryan Held (45.82); Kyle DeCoursey (46.92); Michael Jensen (46.41); Matt Grevers (46.57)	3:05.72	Q
4	2	3	Italy	Santo Condorelli (47.23); Lorenzo Zazzeri (46.99); Davide Nardini (47.44); Alessandro Miressi (46.52)	3:08.18	Q
5	1	5	Japan	Katsumi Nakamura (46.54); Kaiya Seki (47.38); Kosuke Matsui (47.18); Fuyu Yoshida (47.16)	3:08.26	Q
6	2	4	Australia	Louis Townsend (47.03); Alexander Graham (46.94); Jack Gerrard (46.97); Thomas Fraser-Holmes (47.62)	3:08.56	Q
7	2	2	Belarus	Yauhen Tsurkin (47.85); Hryhory Pekarski (47.45); Mikita Tsmyh (48.81); Artsiom Machekin (47.41)	3:11.52	Q, NR
8	2	5	China	Hou Yujie (48.34); Cao Jiwen (47.48); He Junyi (48.17); Yu Hexin (47.98)	3:11.97	Q
9	2	6	Turkey	Hüseyin Emre Sakçı (47.97); Iskender Baslakov (48.28); Yalım Acımış (48.46); Kemal Arda Gürdal (47.55)	3:12.26	NR
10	1	2	Portugal	Miguel Nascimento (47.61) NR; Gabriel Lopes (48.14); Diogo Carvalho (50.33); Alexis Santos (49.48)	3:15.56	NR
11	2	7	New Zealand	Daniel Hunter (48.06); Andrew Jeffcoat (48.92); Matthew Hyde (50.50); Wilrich Coetzee (48.98)	3:16.46	
12	1	3	Chinese Taipei	Lin Chien-liang (49.46); Huang Yen-hsin (49.00); Chuang Mu-lun (48.84); An Ting-yao (49.31)	3:16.61	
13	2	1	Bulgaria	Yordan Yanchev (49.02); Svetlozar Nikolov (49.88); Kaloyan Bratanov (50.10); Antani Ivanov (50.51)	3:19.51	NR

=== Final ===
The final was held on 11 December at 20:52.

Rank	Lane	Nation	Swimmers	Time	Notes
1st place, gold medalist(s)	3	United States	Caeleb Dressel (45.66); Blake Pieroni (45.75); Michael Chadwick (45.86); Ryan Held (45.76)	3:03.03	WR
2nd place, silver medalist(s)	4	Russia	Vladislav Grinev (46.38); Sergey Fesikov (46.21); Vladimir Morozov (45.06); Kliment Kolesnikov (45.46)	3:03.11	ER
3rd place, bronze medalist(s)	5	Brazil	Matheus Santana (46.83); Marcelo Chierighini (46.37); César Cielo (46.34); Breno Correia (45.61)	3:05.15	SA
4	6	Italy	Santo Condorelli (46.76); Alessandro Miressi (46.03); Marco Orsi (46.41); Lorenzo Zazzeri (46.00)	3:05.20	NR
5	7	Australia	Cameron McEvoy (46.28); Louis Townsend (46.85); Jack Gerrard (46.86); Alexander Graham (46.50)	3:06.49	
6	2	Japan	Katsumi Nakamura (46.22 NR); Kaiya Seki (46.87); Kosuke Matsui (46.92); Fuyu Yoshida (47.86)	3:07.87	
7	8	China	Hou Yujie (48.09); Cao Jiwen (46.96); He Junyi (47.54); Yu Hexin (47.96)	3:10.55	NR
8	1	Belarus	Yauhen Tsurkin (47.76); Hryhory Pekarski (47.07); Viktar Staselovich (48.33); Artsiom Machekin (47.43)	3:10.59	NR
