= 2018 FINA World Swimming Championships (25 m) – Men's 4 × 50 metre medley relay =

Men's 4 × 50 metre medley relay at the 2018 FINA World Swimming Championships (25 m)
- Venue: Hangzhou Sports Park Stadium
- Dates: 15 December (heats and final)
- Nations: 14
- Winning time: 1:30.54

Medalists
gold medal	Kliment Kolesnikov; Oleg Kostin; Mikhail Vekovishchev; Evgeny Rylov; Kirill Prigoda; Roman Shevliakov; Ivan Kuzmenko	Russia
silver medal	Ryan Murphy; Michael Andrew; Caeleb Dressel; Ryan Held; Matt Grevers; Andrew Wilson; Jack Conger; Michael Chadwick	United States
bronze medal	Guilherme Guido; Felipe Lima; Nicholas Santos; César Cielo; Matheus Santana	Brazil

The men's 4 × 50 metre medley relay competition of the 2018 FINA World Swimming Championships (25 m) was held on 15 December 2018.

== Records ==
Prior to the competition, the existing world and championship records were as follows.

	Name	Nation	Time	Location	Date
World record	Kliment Kolesnikov (22.83); Kirill Prigoda (25.26); Aleksandr Popkov (22.11); Vladimir Morozov (20.24)	Russia	1:30.44	Copenhagen	17 December 2017
Championship record	Guilherme Guido (23.42); Felipe França Silva (25.33); Nicholas Santos (21.68); César Cielo (20.08)	Brazil	1:30.51	Doha, Qatar	4 December 2014

== Results ==
=== Heats ===
The heats were started at 09:30.

Rank	Heat	Lane	Nation	Swimmers	Time	Notes
1	2	1	Brazil	Guilherme Guido (22.98); Felipe Lima (25.47); Matheus Santana (22.96); César Cielo (20.77)	1:32.18	Q
2	1	4	Italy	Simone Sabbioni (23.36); Nicolò Martinenghi (26.06); Marco Orsi (22.19); Santo Condorelli (20.59)	1:32.30	Q
3	1	1	United States	Matt Grevers (23.19); Andrew Wilson (26.01); Jack Conger (22.36); Michael Chadwick (20.81)	1:32.37	Q
4	2	4	Russia	Kliment Kolesnikov (23.23); Kirill Prigoda (25.51); Roman Shevliakov (22.72); Ivan Kuzmenko (20.94)	1:32.40	Q
5	1	7	Germany	Christian Diener (23.30); Fabian Schwingenschlögl (26.01); Marius Kusch (22.06); Damian Wierling (21.27)	1:32.64	Q
6	2	7	Japan	Ryosuke Irie (23.52); Yasuhiro Koseki (26.27); Kengo Ida (22.24); Kosuke Matsui (20.98)	1:33.01	Q
7	2	3	Australia	Mitch Larkin (23.36); Grayson Bell (26.51); Cameron Alexander Jones (22.45); Cameron McEvoy (20.74)	1:33.06	Q
8	3	4	Turkey	Iskender Baslakov (23.53); Hüseyin Emre Sakçı (25.64); Umitcan Gures (22.51); Kemal Arda Gürdal (21.43)	1:33.11	Q
9	2	5	Belarus	Viktar Staselovich (23.74); Ilya Shymanovich (25.49); Yauhen Tsurkin (22.58); Hryhory Pekarski (21.44)	1:33.25	R
10	1	3	China	Wang Peng (24.37); Wang Lizhuo (26.34); Li Zhuhao (22.67); Yu Hexin (21.14)	1:34.52	R
11	2	6	Ireland	Conor Ferguson (24.12); Darragh Greene (26.60); Brendan Hyland (23.40); Shane Ryan (20.93)	1:35.05	
12	2	2	Switzerland	Thierry Bollin (24.29); Jolann Bovey (26.97); Manuel Leuthard (23.35); Ivo Staub (21.84)	1:36.45	
13	1	6	Chinese Taipei	Chuang Mu-lun (24.86); Wu Chun-feng (26.48); Wang Kuan-hung (24.37); Lin Chien-liang (22.00)	1:37.71	
	1	2	Austria	Heiko Gigler (24.45); Christopher Rothbauer (26.78); Sascha Subarsky (23.04); Bernhard Reitshammer	DSQ	

=== Final ===
The final was held at 19:00.

Rank	Lane	Nation	Swimmers	Time	Notes
1st place, gold medalist(s)	6	Russia	Kliment Kolesnikov (22.87); Oleg Kostin (25.36); Mikhail Vekovishchev (22.09); Evgeny Rylov (20.22)	1:30.54	
2nd place, silver medalist(s)	3	United States	Ryan Murphy (22.73); Michael Andrew (26.16); Caeleb Dressel (21.70); Ryan Held (20.31)	1:30.90	NR
3rd place, bronze medalist(s)	4	Brazil	Guilherme Guido (22.97); Felipe Lima (25.48); Nicholas Santos (22.02); César Cielo (21.02)	1:31.49	
4	5	Italy	Simone Sabbioni (23.40); Fabio Scozzoli (25.51); Marco Orsi (22.23); Santo Condorelli (20.40)	1:31.54	NR
5	2	Germany	Christian Diener (23.21); Fabian Schwingenschlögl (25.65); Marius Kusch (21.92); Damian Wierling (21.02)	1:31.80	
6	0	Belarus	Viktar Staselovich (23.77); Ilya Shymanovich (25.20); Yauhen Tsurkin(22.06); Artsiom Machekin (21.42)	1:32.45	
7	7	Japan	Ryosuke Irie (23.50); Yasuhiro Koseki (26.24); Kengo Ida (22.04); Kosuke Matsui (21.05)	1:32.83	
8	1	Australia	Mitch Larkin (23.34); Grayson Bell (26.62); Cameron Jones (22.33); Cameron McEvoy (20.90)	1:33.19	
9	8	Turkey	İskender Baskalov (23.89); Hüseyin Emre Sakçı (25.91); Ümitcan Güreş (22.90); Kemal Arda Gürdal (21.68)	1:34.38	
