= List of Belarusian records in swimming =

Below is a complete list of the Belarusian records in swimming, which are ratified by the Swimming Federation of Belarus.

== Long Course (50 m) ==
=== Men ===
Event	Time		Name	Club	Date	Meet	Location	Ref
50 m freestyle	22.22		Yauhen Tsurkin	Belarus	10 July 2015	Universiade	Gwangju, China	
100 m freestyle	48.90		Yauhen Tsurkin	Gomel	17 April 2015	Belarusian Championships	Brest, Belarus	
200 m freestyle	1:49.01	h	Igor Koleda	Belarus	17 September 2000	Olympic Games	Sydney, Australia	
400 m freestyle	3:52.78		Ihar Boki	Minsk	2 May 2013	Belarusian Championships	Brest, Belarus	
800 m freestyle	8:02.24		Aliaksandr Gaidukevich	Soviet Union	21 July 1990	Goodwill Games	Seattle, United States	
1500 m freestyle	15:23.00		Aliaksandr Gaidukevich	Soviet Union	15 August 1989	European Championships	Bonn, West Germany	
50m backstroke	24.66	sf	Mikita Tsmyh	Belarus	3 August 2018	European Championships	Glasgow, Great Britain	
100m backstroke	53.81	h	Mikita Tsmyh	Belarus	22 July 2019	World Championships	Gwangju, South Korea	
200m backstroke	1:57.93		Mikita Tsmyh	Mogilev	21 April 2016	Belarusian Championships	Brest, Belarus	
50m breaststroke	26.28	h	Ilya Shymanovich	Minsk	6 April 2023	Belarusian Championships	Brest, Belarus	
100m breaststroke	58.29		Ilya Shymanovich	Belarus	24 March 2019	Golden Tour	Marseille, France	
200m breaststroke	2:10.97		Ilya Shymanovich	Minsk	20 April 2019	Belarusian Championships	Brest, Belarus	
50m butterfly	22.68		Hryhory Pekarski	Belarus	11 August 2026	European Championships	Paris, France	
100m butterfly	51.44		Yauhen Tsurkin	Gomel	15 April 2015	Belarusian Championships	Brest, Belarus	
200m butterfly	1:55.88	h	Ivan Shamshuryn	Vitebsk region	9 April 2026	Belarusian Championships	Minsk, Belarus	
200m individual medley	2:00.64		Pavel Sankovich	Minsk	18 April 2015	Belarusian Championships	Brest, Belarus	
400m individual medley	4:21.35	h	Yury Suvorau	Belarus	27 May 2012	European Championships	Debrecen, Hungary	
4×100m freestyle relay	3:18.28		Artsiom Machekin (50.07); Anton Latkin (48.96); Viktar Staselovich (49.80); Yauhen Tsurkin (49.45)	-	23 April 2016	Belarusian Championships	Brest, Belarus	
4×200m freestyle relay	7:24.83	h	Igor Koleda (1:49.44); Pavel Lagoun (1:52.83); Dmitry Koptur (1:51.14); Valeryan Khuroshvili (1:51.42)	Belarus	19 September 2000	Olympic Games	Sydney, Australia	
4×100m medley relay	3:33.63		Mikita Tsmyh (54.54); Ilya Shymanovich (58.94); Yauhen Tsurkin (51.23); Artsiom Machekin (48.92)	Belarus	30 July 2017	World Championships	Budapest, Hungary	

Legend: # – Record awaiting ratification by Swimming Federation of Belarus; WR – World record; ER – European record; e – equalled existing record;
Records not set in finals: h – heat; sf – semifinal; r – relay 1st leg; rh – relay heat 1st leg; b – B final; † – en route to final mark; so – swim-off; tt – time trial

=== Women ===
Event	Time		Name	Club	Date	Meet	Location	Ref
50m freestyle	24.11		Aliaksandra Herasimenia	Belarus	13 August 2016	Olympic Games	Rio de Janeiro, Brazil	
100m freestyle	53.38		Aliaksandra Herasimenia	Belarus	2 August 2012	Olympic Games	London, Great Britain	
200m freestyle	1:57.91		Alena Popchanka	Belarus	3 August 2002	European Championships	Berlin, Germany	
400m freestyle	4:09.70		Irina Laricheva	Soviet Union	August 1984	Friendship Games	Moscow, Soviet Union	
800m freestyle	8:36.83		Irina Laricheva	-	June 1984	USSR Championships	Kiev, Soviet Union	
1500m freestyle	16:40.60		Irina Laricheva	-	28 August 1982			
50m backstroke	27.23		Aliaksandra Herasimenia	Belarus	27 July 2017	World Championships	Budapest, Hungary	
100m backstroke	59.08		Anastasiya Shkurdai	Brest region	17 July 2020	Belarusian Cup	Brest, Belarus	
200m backstroke	2:06.95		Anastasiya Shkurdai	Brest	4 April 2023	Belarusian Championships	Brest, Belarus	
50m breaststroke	30.43	sf	Alina Zmushka	Gomel region	5 April 2022	Belarusian Championships	Brest, Belarus	
100m breaststroke	1:05.93	sf	Alina Zmushka	Individual Neutral Athletes	28 July 2024	Olympic Games	Paris, France	
200m breaststroke	2:23.30		Alina Zmushka	Neutral Athletes A	22 May 2025	Mare Nostrum	Barcelona, Spain	
50m butterfly	25.56		Anastasiya Shkurdai	Brest region	1 July 2021	Belarusian Cup	Brest, Belarus	
100m butterfly	56.95		Anastasiya Shkurdai	Brest region	16 July 2020	Belarusian Cup	Brest, Belarus	
200m butterfly	2:14.73		Anastasiya Vaskevich	Grodno region	3 July 2019	Belarusian Cup	Brest, Belarus	
200m individual medley	2:13.04		Hanna Shcherba	Belarus	1 August 2002	European Championships	Berlin, Germany	
400m individual medley	4:49.16		Olga Klevakina	Soviet Union	23 August 1978	World Championships	West Berlin, West Germany	
4×100m freestyle relay	3:40.37		Aliaksandra Herasimenia (53.71); Yuliya Khitraya (54.96); Aksana Dziamidava (55.59); Nastassia Karakouskaya (56.11)	Belarus	21 April 2016	Belarusian Championships	Brest, Belarus	
4×200m freestyle relay	8:21.70	h	Svetlana Zhidko (2:04.89); Inga Borodich (2:06.27); Natalya Baranovskaya (2:05.87); Alena Popchanka (2:04.67)	Belarus	25 July 1996	Olympic Games	Atlanta, United States	
4×100m medley relay	4:00.37		Anastasiya Shkurdai (59.53); Alina Zmushka (1:06.64); Anastasiya Kuliashova (58.30); Nastassia Karakouskaya (55.90)	Belarus	23 May 2021	European Championships	Budapest, Hungary	

Legend: # – Record awaiting ratification by Swimming Federation of Belarus; WR – World record; ER – European record; e – equalled existing record;
Records not set in finals: h – heat; sf – semifinal; r – relay 1st leg; rh – relay heat 1st leg; b – B final; † – en route to final mark; so – swim-off; tt – time trial

=== Mixed relay ===
Event	Time	Name	Club	Date	Meet	Location	Ref
4×100m freestyle relay	3:31.62	Viktar Krasochka (51.38); Aliaksandra Herasimenia (53.72); Nastassia Karakouskaya (56.13); Artsiom Machekin (50.39)	Minsk	15 July 2016	Belarusian Cup	Brest, Belarus	
4×100m medley relay	3:45.44	Anastasiya Shkurdai (59.62); Ilya Shymanovich (58.49); Anastasiya Kuliashova (58.62); Ruclan Skamaroshka (48.71)	Belarus	24 July 2022	Solidarity Games	Kazan, Russia	

Legend: # – Record awaiting ratification by Swimming Federation of Belarus; WR – World record; ER – European record; e – equalled existing record;
Records not set in finals: h – heat; sf – semifinal; r – relay 1st leg; rh – relay heat 1st leg; b – B final; † – en route to final mark; so – swim-off; tt – time trial

== Short Course (25 m) ==
=== Men ===
Event	Time		Name	Club	Date	Meet	Location	Ref
50m freestyle	21.30		Hryhory Pekarski	Minsk	5 November 2026	Belarusian Championships	Minsk, Belarus	
100m freestyle	47.08	r	Hryhory Pekarski	Belarus	19 December 2020	Belarusian Championships	Brest, Belarus	
200m freestyle	1:45.17		Ruslan Skamaroshka	Grodno region	18 December 2020	Belarusian Championships	Brest, Belarus	
400m freestyle	3:45.40		Igor Koleda	Belarus	11 December 1998	European Championships	Sheffield, Great Britain	
800m freestyle	7:49.36		Kanstantsin Kurachkin	Minsk	9 December 2022	Belarusian Championships	Brest, Belarus	
1500m freestyle	14:54.53	h	Dmitry Koptur	Belarus	7 April 2002	World Championships	Moscow, Russia	
50m backstroke	22.82		Pavel Sankovich	Belarus	19 November 2017	World Cup	Singapore, Singapore	
100m backstroke	50.05		Pavel Sankovich	Belarus	12 December 2009	European Championships	Istanbul, Turkey	
200m backstroke	1:51.42		Mikita Tsmyh	Belarus	23 December 2017	Vladimir Salnikov Cup	Saint Petersburg, Russia	
50m breaststroke	25.25		Ilya Shymanovich	Belarus	7 November 2021	European Championships	Kazan, Russia	
100m breaststroke	55.28	WR	Ilya Shymanovich	Energy Standard	26 November 2021	International Swimming League	Eindhoven, Netherlands	
200m breaststroke	2:01.73		Ilya Shymanovich	Belarus	6 November 2021	European Championships	Kazan, Russia	
50m butterfly	22.05	sf	Hryhory Pekarski	Neutral Athletes A	10 December 2024	World Championships	Budapest, Hungary	
100m butterfly	49.86		Hryhory Pekarski	Belarus	28 December 2021	Vladimir Salnikov Cup	Saint Petersburg, Russia	
200m butterfly	1:52.48		Ivan Shamshuryn	Vitebsk	7 November 2026	Belarusian Championships	Minsk, Belarus	
100m individual medley	52.25		Pavel Sankovich	Belarus	3 August 2017	World Cup	Moscow, Russia	
200m individual medley	1:55.10		Pavel Sankovich	Belarus	18 December 2016	Vladimir Salnikov Cup	Saint Petersburg, Russia	
400m individual medley	4:11.26		Yury Suvorau	Vitebsk	12 July 2012	Belarusian Championships	Brest, Belarus	
4×50m freestyle relay	1:25.01		Yauhen Tsurkin (21.83); Anton Latkin (21.11); Viktar Staselovich (21.03); Artyom Machekin (21.04)	Belarus	2 December 2015	European Championships	Netanya, Israel	
4×100m freestyle relay	3:09.82		Hryhory Pekarski (47.08); Ruslan Skamaroshka (46.94); Viktar Staselovich (47.97); Yauhen Tsurkin (47.83)	Belarus	19 December 2020	Belarusian Championships	Brest, Belarus	
4×200m freestyle relay	7:10.31		Ruslan Skamaroshka (1:46.58); Kanstantsin Kurachkin (1:47.34); Dzmitry Schulga (1:49.20); Ivan Adamchuk (1:47.19)	Belarus	23 November 2022	Solidarity Games	Kazan, Russia	
4×50m medley relay	1:32.06		Pavel Sankovich (23.16); Ilya Shymanovich (25.48); Yauhen Tsurkin (22.23); Anton Latkin (21.19)	Belarus	17 December 2017	European Championships	Copenhagen, Denmark	
4×100m medley relay	3:24.41		Viktar Staselovich (51.94); Ilya Shymanovich (55.60); Yauhen Tsurkin (49.59); Artsiom Machekin (47.28)	Belarus	16 December 2018	World Championships	Hangzhou, China	

Legend: # – Record awaiting ratification by Swimming Federation of Belarus; WR – World record; ER – European record; e – equalled existing record;
Records not set in finals: h – heat; sf – semifinal; r – relay 1st leg; rh – relay heat 1st leg; b – B final; † – en route to final mark; so – swim-off; tt – time trial

=== Women ===
Event	Time		Name	Club	Date	Meet	Location	Ref
50 m freestyle	23.64		Aliaksandra Herasimenia	Belarus	16 December 2012	World Championships	Istanbul, Turkey	
100 m freestyle	52.06		Aliaksandra Herasimenia	Belarus	21 December 2013	Vladimir Salnikov Cup	Saint Petersburg, Russia	
200 m freestyle	1:55.66		Alena Popchanka	Belarus	14 December 2003	European Championships	Dublin, Ireland	
400 m freestyle	4:06.13		Natalya Baranovskaya	Belarus	11 December 1999	European Championships	Lisbon, Portugal	
800 m freestyle	8:39.17		Alesia Akinchyts	Mogilev region	11 November 2021	Belarusian Championships	Brest, Belarus	
1500 m freestyle	16:22.86		Alesia Akinchyts	Mogilev region	8 December 2022	Belarusian Championships	Brest, Belarus	
50 m backstroke	26.05		Anastasiya Shkurdai	Energy Standard	4 December 2021	International Swimming League	Eindhoven, Netherlands	
100 m backstroke	56.07	sf	Anastasiya Shkurdai	Neutral Athletes A	10 December 2024	World Championships	Budapest, Hungary	
200 m backstroke	2:00.15		Anastasiya Shkurdai	Brest	10 November 2023	Belarusian Championships	Brest, Belarus	
50m breaststroke	29.49		Alina Zmushka	Belarus	21 November 2022	Solidarity Games	Kazan, Russia	
100m breaststroke	1:03.41		Alina Zmushka	Neutral Athletes A	12 December 2024	World Championships	Budapest, Hungary	
200m breaststroke	2:17.30		Alina Zmushka	Neutral Athletes A	13 December 2024	World Championships	Budapest, Hungary	
50m butterfly	25.28		Anastasiya Shkurdai	Belarus	5 December 2019	European Championships	Glasgow, Great Britain	
100m butterfly	55.64		Anastasiya Shkurdai	Energy Standard	1 November 2020	International Swimming League	Budapest, Hungary	
200m butterfly	2:08.80		Anastasiya Kuliashova	Minsk	5 November 2026	Belarusian Championships	Minsk, Belarus	
100m individual medley	57.59		Anastasiya Shkurdai	Energy Standard	22 November 2020	International Swimming League	Budapest, Hungary	
200m individual medley	2:07.69		Anastasiya Shkurdai	Energy Standard	9 November 2020	International Swimming League	Budapest, Hungary	
400m individual medley	4:43.60		Hanna Shcherba	-	13 February 2002			
4×50m freestyle relay	1:38.39		Yuliya Khitraya (25.12); Aliaksandra Herasimenia (23.68); Aksana Dziamidava (25.10); Sviatlana Khakhlova (24.49)	Belarus	22 November 2012	European Championships	Chartres, France	
4×100m freestyle relay	3:39.62		Aliaksandra Herasimenia (54.53); Hanna Kopachenya (57.29); Hanna Shcherba (54.33); Alena Popchanka (53.47)	Belarus	6 April 2002	World Championships	Moscow, Russia	
4×200m freestyle relay								
4×50m medley relay	1:46.34		Aliaksandra Herasimenia (26.18); Inna Kapishina (30.56); Iryna Niafedava (25.63); Sviatlana Khakhlova (23.97)	Belarus	12 December 2009	European Championships	Istanbul, Turkey	
4×50m medley relay	1:46.20	'#'	Anastasiya Shkurdai (26.51); Alina Zmushka (29.73); Anastasiya Kuliashova (25.42); Nastassia Karakouskaya (24.54)	Belarus	16 December 2022	Vladimir Salnikov Cup	Saint Petersburg, Russia	
4×100m medley relay	3:58.43		Veranika Strashnova (1:01.37); Alina Zmushka (1:04.18); Anastasiya Kuliashova (57.48); Nastassia Karakouskaya (55.40)	Belarus	25 November 2022	Solidarity Games	Kazan, Russia	

Legend: # – Record awaiting ratification by Swimming Federation of Belarus; WR – World record; ER – European record; e – equalled existing record;
Records not set in finals: h – heat; sf – semifinal; r – relay 1st leg; rh – relay heat 1st leg; b – B final; † – en route to final mark; so – swim-off; tt – time trial

=== Mixed relay ===
Event	Time		Name	Club	Date	Meet	Location	Ref
4×50 m freestyle relay	1:31.21	h	Yauhen Tsurkin (21.54); Viktar Staselovich (21.51); Aliaksandra Herasimenia (24.02); Yuliya Khitraya (24.14)	Belarus	5 December 2015	European Championships	Netanya, Israel	
4×50 m medley relay	1:37.74		Pavel Sankovich (22.89); Ilya Shymanovich (25.32); Anastasiya Shkurdai (25.28); Yuliya Khitraya (24.25)	Belarus	14 December 2017	European Championships	Copenhagen, Denmark	

Legend: # – Record awaiting ratification by Swimming Federation of Belarus; e – equalled existing record;
Records not set in finals: h – heat; so – swim-off
