= Swimming at the 2018 European Aquatics Championships – Men's 50 metre freestyle =

2018 swimming competition

Men's 50 metre freestyle at the 2018 European Aquatics Championships
- Venue: Tollcross International Swimming Centre
- Dates: 8 August (heats and semifinals); 9 August (final)
- Competitors: 66 from 32 nations
- Winning time: 21.34

Medalists
gold medal	Ben Proud	Great Britain
silver medal	Kristian Golomeev	Greece
bronze medal	Andrea Vergani	Italy

The Men's 50 metre freestyle competition of the 2018 European Aquatics Championships was held on 8 and 9 August 2018.

== Records ==
Prior to the competition, the existing world and championship records were as follows.

	Name	Nation	Time	Location	Date
World record	César Cielo	Brazil	20.91	São Paulo	18 December 2009
European record	Frédérick Bousquet	France	20.94	Montpellier	26 April 2009
Championship record	Florent Manaudou	France	21.32	Berlin	24 August 2014

The following new records were set during this competition.

Date	Event	Name	Nationality	Time	Record
8 August	Semifinal	Ben Proud	Great Britain	21.11	CR

== Results ==
=== Heats ===
The heats were held on 8 August at 09:12.

Rank	Heat	Lane	Name	Nationality	Time	Notes
1	7	5	Kristian Golomeev	Greece	21.68	Q
1	8	4	Ben Proud	Great Britain	21.68	Q
3	6	5	Andrea Vergani	Italy	21.72	Q
4	7	4	Paweł Juraszek	Poland	21.81	Q
5	6	4	Vladimir Morozov	Russia	21.85	Q
6	6	6	Andriy Govorov	Ukraine	21.95	Q
7	8	3	Jesse Puts	Netherlands	22.03	Q
8	8	6	Luca Dotto	Italy	22.15	Q
9	8	5	Ari-Pekka Liukkonen	Finland	22.19	Q
10	6	2	Thomas Fannon	Great Britain	22.26	Q
11	8	7	Sergey Fesikov	Russia	22.31	Q
12	5	5	Alessandro Miressi	Italy	22.34	
13	5	7	Andrej Barna	Serbia	22.36	Q
13	8	1	Yonel Govindin	France	22.36	Q
15	6	0	Simonas Bilis	Lithuania	22.42	Q
16	7	2	Lorenzo Zazzeri	Italy	22.47	
17	7	1	Maxime Grousset	France	22.48	Q
18	8	2	David Cumberlidge	Great Britain	22.49	
19	5	9	Bruno Blašković	Croatia	22.50	Q
20	8	8	Meiron Cheruti	Israel	22.51	
21	7	9	Niksa Stojkovski	Norway	22.52	
22	7	7	Ivan Kuzmenko	Russia	22.64	
23	6	7	Sergii Shevtsov	Ukraine	22.67	
24	6	3	Paweł Sendyk	Poland	22.68	
25	6	8	Nyls Korstanje	Netherlands	22.74	
26	5	6	Nándor Németh	Hungary	22.77	
27	3	4	Péter Holoda	Hungary	22.78	
27	7	8	Björn Seeliger	Sweden	22.78	
29	8	9	Odyssefs Meladinis	Greece	22.81	
30	5	0	Christoffer Carlsen	Sweden	22.82	
31	5	2	Mislav Sever	Croatia	22.86	
32	4	5	Isak Eliasson	Sweden	22.89	
33	5	4	Anton Latkin	Belarus	22.95	
34	4	4	Bernhard Reitshammer	Austria	22.97	
35	5	3	Anton Herrala	Finland	23.00	
36	5	1	Nikola Aćin	Serbia	23.02	
37	4	8	Tobias Bjerg	Denmark	23.06	
38	4	2	Yalım Acımış	Turkey	23.08	
39	6	9	Miguel Nascimento	Portugal	23.10	
40	7	0	Calum Bain	Ireland	23.11	
40	4	9	George-Adrian Raţiu	Romania	23.11	
42	4	0	Daniel Zaitsev	Estonia	23.12	
43	4	6	Julien Henx	Luxembourg	23.17	
44	8	0	Andrey Zhilkin	Russia	23.18	
45	4	7	Emir Muratović	Bosnia and Herzegovina	23.19	
45	3	7	Alexander Trampitsch	Austria	23.19	
47	4	3	Nikola Miljenić	Croatia	23.21	
47	3	6	Predrag Miloš	Iceland	23.21	
49	2	2	Karl Luht	Estonia	23.22	
50	4	1	Viktar Krasochka	Belarus	23.24	
51	3	1	Robert Powell	Ireland	23.35	
52	2	5	İskender Başlakov	Turkey	23.40	
53	3	9	Nikita Tsernosev	Estonia	23.52	
54	2	4	Artur Barseghyan	Armenia	23.57	
55	2	7	Vahan Mkhitaryan	Armenia	23.59	
56	3	3	Tomas Sungaila	Lithuania	23.65	
57	2	6	Georgia Biganishvili	Georgia	23.74	
58	3	8	Kemal Arda Gürdal	Turkey	23.76	
59	3	0	Matthew Zammit	Malta	23.84	
60	1	3	Vladimir Mamikonyan	Armenia	23.87	
61	2	3	Marko-Matteus Langel	Estonia	24.10	
62	2	1	Matthew Galea	Malta	24.60	
63	2	0	Cristian Santi	San Marino	25.64	
64	2	8	Gianluca Pasolini	San Marino	25.69	
65	1	5	Ruben Gharibyan	Armenia	26.07	
66	1	4	Dren Ukimeraj	Kosovo	26.14	
	3	2	Richárd Bohus	Hungary	Did not start	
	5	8	Ziv Kalontarov	Israel	Did not start	
	6	1	Pieter Timmers	Belgium	Did not start	
	7	3	Konrad Czerniak	Poland	Did not start	
	7	6	Damian Wierling	Germany	Did not start	

=== Semifinals ===
The semifinals were held on 8 August at 17:04.

==== Semifinal 1 ====
Rank	Lane	Name	Nationality	Time	Notes
1	4	Ben Proud	Great Britain	21.11	Q, CR, NR
2	5	Paweł Juraszek	Poland	21.67	Q
3	1	Simonas Bilis	Lithuania	22.04	QSO
3	3	Andriy Govorov	Ukraine	22.04	QSO
5	8	Bruno Blašković	Croatia	22.06	
5	6	Luca Dotto	Italy	22.06	
7	2	Thomas Fannon	Great Britain	22.14	
8	7	Yonel Govindin	France	22.18	

==== Semifinal 2 ====
Rank	Lane	Name	Nationality	Time	Notes
1	5	Andrea Vergani	Italy	21.37	Q, NR
2	3	Vladimir Morozov	Russia	21.44	Q, =NR
3	4	Kristian Golomeev	Greece	21.52	Q, NR
4	2	Ari-Pekka Liukkonen	Finland	21.96	Q
5	6	Jesse Puts	Netherlands	22.02	Q
6	7	Sergey Fesikov	Russia	22.15	
7	1	Andrej Barna	Serbia	22.27	
8	8	Maxime Grousset	France	22.27	

==== Swim-off ====
The swim-off was held on 8 August at 18:40.

Rank	Lane	Name	Nationality	Time	Notes
1	4	Simonas Bilis	Lithuania	21.70	Q, NR
2	5	Andriy Govorov	Ukraine	21.74	

=== Final ===
The final was held on 9 August at 16:50.

Rank	Lane	Name	Nationality	Time	Notes
1st place, gold medalist(s)	4	Ben Proud	Great Britain	21.34	
2nd place, silver medalist(s)	6	Kristian Golomeev	Greece	21.44	NR
3rd place, bronze medalist(s)	5	Andrea Vergani	Italy	21.68	
4	3	Vladimir Morozov	Russia	21.74	
5	8	Simonas Bilis	Lithuania	21.97	
6	1	Jesse Puts	Netherlands	22.08	
7	7	Ari-Pekka Liukkonen	Finland	22.11	
8	2	Paweł Juraszek	Poland	22.14	
