= Ryan Held =

American swimmer (born 1995)

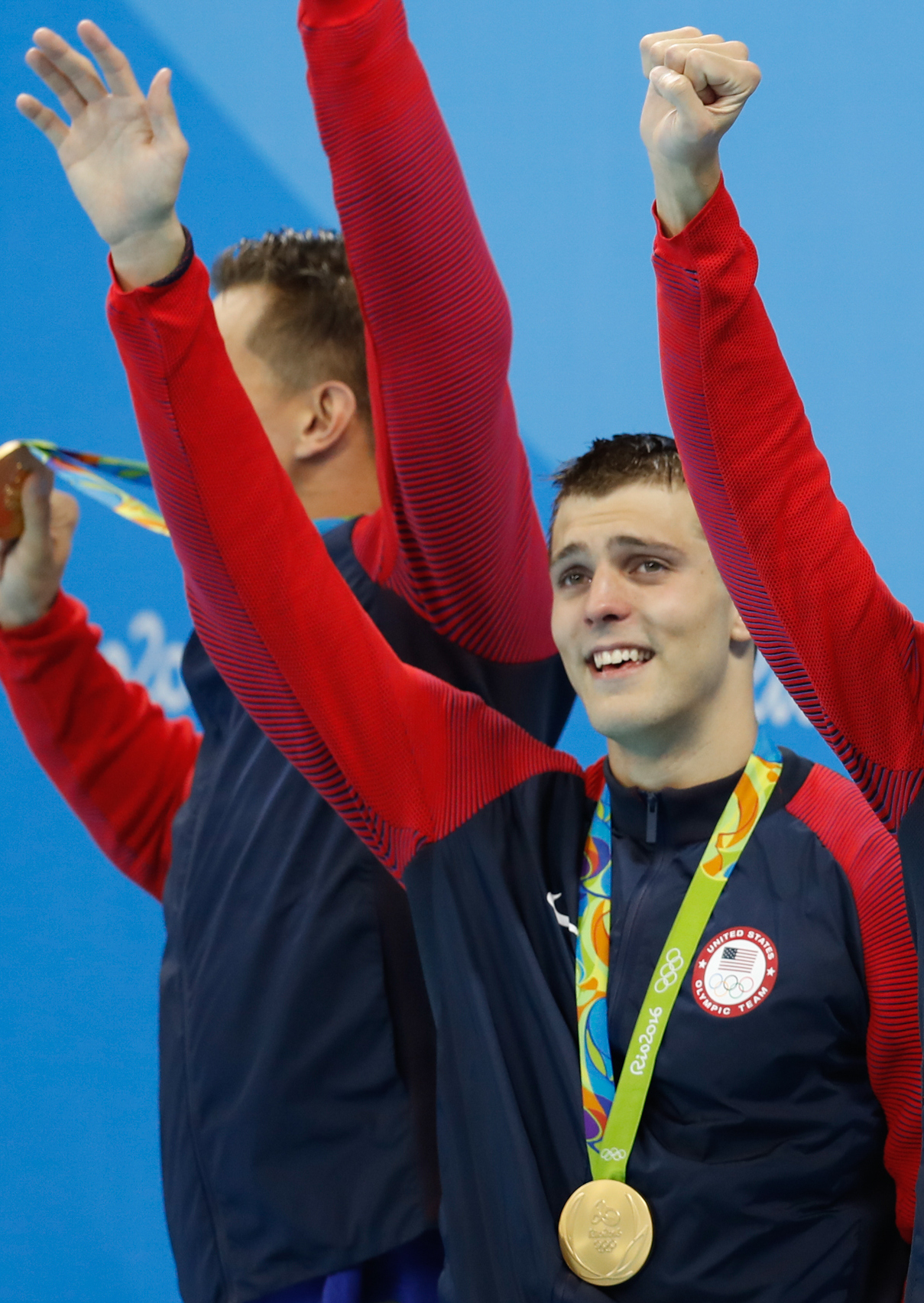
- Held at the 2016 Summer Olympics

Personal information
- National team: United States
- Born: June 27, 1995 (age 31) Springfield, Illinois, U.S.

Sport
- Sport: Swimming
- Strokes: Freestyle
- College team: North Carolina State (NCSU)
- Coach: Braden Holloway (NCSU); Todd DeSorbo (NCSU)
Medal record
Men's swimming
Representing the United States
Olympic Games
Gold medal – first place	2016 Rio de Janeiro	4×100 m freestyle
Gold medal – first place	2024 Paris	4×100 m freestyle
World Championships (LC)
Gold medal – first place	2022 Budapest	4×100 m freestyle
Silver medal – second place	2022 Budapest	4×100 m medley
Bronze medal – third place	2022 Budapest	4×100 m mixed freestyle
Bronze medal – third place	2023 Fukuoka	4×100 m freestyle
World Championships (SC)
Gold medal – first place	2018 Hangzhou	4×50 m freestyle
Gold medal – first place	2018 Hangzhou	4×100 m freestyle
Gold medal – first place	2018 Hangzhou	4×100 m medley
Gold medal – first place	2018 Hangzhou	4×50 m mixed freestyle
Gold medal – first place	2021 Abu Dhabi	4×200 m freestyle
Gold medal – first place	2021 Abu Dhabi	4×50 m medley
Silver medal – second place	2018 Hangzhou	4×50 m medley
Silver medal – second place	2021 Abu Dhabi	50 m freestyle
Silver medal – second place	2021 Abu Dhabi	100 m freestyle
Silver medal – second place	2021 Abu Dhabi	4×100 m medley
Bronze medal – third place	2021 Abu Dhabi	4×100 m freestyle
World University Games
Gold medal – first place	2017 Taipei	100 m freestyle
Gold medal – first place	2017 Taipei	4×100 m freestyle
Gold medal – first place	2017 Taipei	4×100 m medley

Ryan Held (born June 27, 1995) is an American retired freestyle swimmer who specializes in the sprint events, and is currently sponsored by Arena. He holds three world records in short course relay events. At the 2016 Summer Olympics he won a gold medal in the 4×100 meter freestyle relays, swimming in both the prelims and the final of the event. He won a second gold medal in the 2024 Summer Olympics in the 4×100 meter freestyle relays, though he did not swim in the finals of the event.

In 2021, he won silver medals in the 50 meter freestyle and the 100 meter freestyle at the 2021 World Short Course Championships. At his first FINA World Aquatics Championships, the 2022 World Aquatics Championships, he won a gold medal in the 4×100 meter freestyle relay.

== Background ==
He attended Christ the King grade school in Springfield, Illinois, and attended high school at Sacred-Heart Griffin, where he graduated in 2014 and was coached by Dr. James Stegeman. During his senior year in 2014, Held was named Illinois State Swimmer of the Year. During his collegiate years, held attended North Carolina State University where he swam for Coaches Braden Holloway and Todd DeSorbo.

== Career ==
=== 2016 Summer Olympics ===
2016 Summer Olympics
Gold medal – first place	4×100 m freestyle	3:09.92

At the 2016 US trials he qualified for the 2016 Summer Olympics as a member of the 4×100 meter freestyle relay team. In the Olympic heats, he swam a split time of 47.79 on the second leg, impressing the coaching staff enough to give him the nod to swim in the final. Although Held's time was not as fast as Anthony Ervin’s, head coach Bob Bowman made the decision due to youth since "Younger legs, coming back so quickly". In the final he split 47.73 on the third leg to preserve Team USA's lead, winning the gold medal together with Caeleb Dressel, Michael Phelps, and Nathan Adrian. Held and the other finals relay members won the USA Swimming Foundation Golden Goggle Award for "Relay Performance of the Year" for their performance.

=== 2024 Summer Olympics ===
At the 2024 Paris Olympics, Held won the Gold medal with the American team in the Men's 4x100-metre freestyle relay, though he did not swim in the event finals. The American Gold medal relay team swam a combined time of 3:09.28 in the finals without Held. The Australian team placed second for the Silver and the Italian team finished third for the bronze.

=== 2018 World Championships ===
2018 World Championships
Gold medal – first place	4×100 m freestyle	3:03.03 (WR)
Gold medal – first place	4×50 m mixed freestyle	1:27.89 (WR)
Gold medal – first place	4×50 m freestyle	1:21.80 (WR)
Gold medal – first place	4×100 m medley relay	3:19.98 (AM)
Silver medal – second place	4×50 m medley relay	1:30.90 (NR)

At the 2018 World Short Course Championships in Hangzhou, China, Held won four gold medals and one silver medal. In the 4×100 meter freestyle relay, Held anchored the finals relay consisting of him, Caeleb Dressel, Blake Pieroni, and Michael Chadwick to a gold medal win in a world record time of 3:03.03. For the 4×50 meter mixed freestyle relay, Held split a 20.60 for the second leg of the relay and helped the finals relay set a new world record and win the gold medal in the event with a finals relay time of 1:27.89. In the final of the 4×50 meter freestyle relay, Held swam the fastest split of his relay teammates, Caeleb Dressel, Jack Conger, and Michael Chadwick, with a time of 20.25 seconds, which helped the relay win the gold medal and set a new world record in the event at 1:21.80. Gold eluded Held in the 4×50 meter medley relay where he swam the freestyle leg of the relay, earned a silver medal, and helped set an American record of 1:30.90 in the final with Ryan Murphy (backstroke), Michael Andrew (breaststroke), and Caeleb Dressel (butterfly). Concluding his competition at the Championships, Held swam the freestyle leg of the 4×100 meter medley relay, splitting a time of 45.23 seconds to help the finals relay win the gold medal and set a new Americas record and Championships record of 3:19.98 in the event.

=== 2019 ===
At the 2019 Phillips 66 Summer National Championships in Stanford, California, Held ranked first in the 100 meter freestyle prelims heats with a time of 47.43 seconds on July 31, which broke the U.S. Open record and Championships record of 47.58 seconds set by Jason Lezak over 11 years earlier on July 2, 2008. Later the same day in the final, Held won the 100 meter freestyle with a time of 47.39 seconds, breaking his own U.S. Open and Championships records he set earlier in the day.

=== 2021 World Championships ===
2021 World Championships
Gold medal – first place	4×200 m freestyle	6:47.00 (NR)
Gold medal – first place	4×50 m medley	1:30.51 (CR, AM)
Silver medal – second place	50 m freestyle	20.70
Silver medal – second place	100 m freestyle	45.63
Silver medal – second place	4×100 m medley	3:20.50
Bronze medal – third place	4×100 m freestyle	3:05.42

Held entered to compete in the short course 50 meter freestyle and 100 meter freestyle for his individual events at the 2021 World Short Course Championships in December in Abu Dhabi, United Arab Emirates. As part of the United States team for the Championships, Held was number two on "The Week That Was" honor for the week of November 1, 2021, from Swimming World. Gaining racing experience in short course meters as preparation for the World Championships, Held competed at the 2021 Ron Johnson Masters Championship in Tempe, Arizona in November, where he swam a 21.28 and broke the Masters world record in the 50 meter freestyle for the 25–29 age group set at 21.37 by César Cielo in 2014.

On day one of competition, Held split a 46.17 for the anchor leg of the 4×100 meter freestyle relay, qualifying it to the final ranked second with prelims relay teammates Shaine Casas, Hunter Tapp, and Tom Shields. In the final, Zach Apple, substituted in for Tom Shields and the relay finished in a time of 3:05.42 to win the bronze medal. The second day, Held achieved a fourth-place finish in the 4×50 meter mixed freestyle relay with his finals relay teammates in 1:29.04, splitting a 20.86 for the lead-off leg of the relay. In the morning of day three, Held finished second in prelims heat ten of the 50 meter freestyle behind Ben Proud of Great Britain with a time of 21.01, which qualified Held for the semifinals ranking third overall. Held ranked first in the semifinals later in the day with a 20.81, less than one-tenth of a second ahead of second-ranked Joshua Liendo of Canada. On day four, Held led-off the 4×50 meter freestyle relay with a personal best time of 20.72 seconds and helped the relay achieve a time of 1:23.81, which placed them fourth. Later in the same session Held won the silver medal in the 50 meter freestyle with a personal best time of 20.70 seconds, which was the first individual medal of his career at a World Championships. In his final event of the evening, Held helped set an American record of 6:47.00 and win the gold medal in the 4×200 metre freestyle relay with finals relay teammates Kieran Smith, Trenton Julian, and Carson Foster.

In the morning of day five, Held ranked fifth in the prelims heats of the 100 meter freestyle with a 46.72, qualifying for the semifinals along with fellow American Zach Apple. Held anchored the 4×50 meter medley relay in the evening final, splitting a 20.52 to contribute to the gold-medal-winning time of 1:30.51, which tied the Russia relay team, set a new American record, and tied the Championships record and Americas record. For the semifinals of the 100 meter freestyle Held swam a 46.36, ranked fourth, and qualified for the final. In the final the following day, which was the final day of competition, Held won the silver medal with a personal best time of 45.63 seconds. On the freestyle leg of the 4×100 meter medley relay in the final, Held split a 45.43 to help achieve a time of 3:20.50 and a silver-medal-win.

=== 2022 ===
On April 2, at the 2022 Pro Swim Series at Northside Swim Center in San Antonio, Texas, Held tied Drew Kibler for third in rank in the prelims heats of the 100 meter freestyle with a time of 49.46 seconds and qualified for the final later in the day. He swam a 49.20 in the final to place third, finishing seven-hundredths of a second behind first-place finisher Andrej Barna.

==== 2022 International Team Trials ====
Day one of the 2022 US International Team Trials in late April in Greensboro, North Carolina, Held qualified for the final of the 100 meter freestyle ranking second from the prelims heats with a time of 48.20 seconds. He placed third in the final with a time of 48.18 seconds, qualifying for the 2022 World Aquatics Championships team in the 4×100 meter freestyle relay. Day two, he qualified for the b-final of the 200 meter freestyle with a time of 1:48.93 and overall rank of 15th in the prelims heats. In the b-final, he lowered his time to a 1:47.99 to place third, 11th overall. In the 50 meter freestyle prelims heats on the morning of the fifth and final day, he ranked fourth with a 21.92 and qualified for the final. He swam a personal best time of 21.85 seconds in the final to take fourth-place.

==== 2022 World Aquatics Championships ====
2022 World Championships
Gold medal – first place	4×100 m freestyle	3:09.34
Silver medal – second place	4×100 m medley	3:27.79
Bronze medal – third place	4×100 m mixed freestyle	3:21.09

On the first day of swimming at the 2022 World Aquatics Championships, Held split a 47.13 for the second leg of the 4×100 meter freestyle relay in the prelims heats, the fastest out of him and his prelims relay teammates, helping qualify the relay to the final ranking first and securing his spot on the finals relay with his split time. In the final later the same day, he split the fastest out of him and his finals relay teammates with a 46.99 on the second leg of the relay, helping achieve a gold medal victory in a final time of 3:09.34. On day seven, he split a 47.85 in the preliminaries of the 4×100 meter mixed freestyle relay, helping qualify the relay to the final ranking first. In the final, he split a 47.93 for the lead-off leg, helping win the bronze medal in a time of 3:21.09. For the 4×100 metre medley relay, Held split a 47.36 for the freestyle leg of the relay in the final to help win the silver medal in 3:27.79.

Following the Championships, Held was announced to the USA Swimming roster for the 2022 Duel in the Pool, which was held starting August 19 in Sydney, Australia.

== Personal bests ==
As of April 30, 2022

Long Course
Event	Time	Meet	Date	Note(s)
50 m freestyle	21.50	2023 USA Swimming Championships	July 1, 2023	
100 m freestyle	47.39	2019 U.S. Summer Nationals	July 31, 2019	
200 m freestyle	1:47.57	2020 U.S. Olympic Trials	June 14, 2021	(Preliminaries)
50 m backstroke	24.59	2018 Phillips 66 Summer National Championships	July 27, 2018	(Preliminaries)
50 m butterfly	23.41	2023 USA Swimming Championships	June 29, 2023	
100 m butterfly	52.15	2019 U.S. Summer Nationals	August 2, 2019	

Short course
Event	Time	Meet	Date	Note(s)
50 m freestyle	20.70	2021 World Championships	December 19, 2021	
100 m freestyle	45.63	2021 World Championships	December 21, 2021	
50 m backstroke	23.17	2021 International Swimming League	September 18, 2021	
50 m butterfly	22.80	2021 International Swimming League	September 19, 2021	
100 m individual medley	53.36	2021 International Swimming League	September 19, 2021	

Short course yards
Event	Time	Meet	Date	Note(s)
50 y freestyle	18.56 (r)	2018 NCAA Championships	March 22, 2018	
100 y freestyle	41.05 (r)	2018 NCAA Championships	March 24, 2018	
200 y freestyle	1:31.37 (r)	2017 NCAA Championships	March 22, 2017	
100 y butterfly	44.79	2018 ACC Championships	March 1, 2017	

r = relay lead-off

== Continental and national records ==
=== Long course meters (50 m pool) ===
No.	Event	Time		Meet	Date	Location	Type	Status	Ref
1	100 m freestyle	47.43	h	2019 Phillips 66 Summer National Championships	July 31, 2019	Stanford, California	US	Former	
2	100 m freestyle (2)	47.39		2019 Phillips 66 Summer National Championships	July 31, 2019	Stanford, California	US	Current	

Legend: e – equalled existing record; US – U.S. Open record;
Records not set in finals: h – heat; sf – semifinal; r – relay 1st leg; rh – relay heat 1st leg; b – B final; † – en route to final mark; so – swim-off; tt – time trial

=== Short course meters (25 m pool) ===
No.	Event	Time	Meet	Date	Location	Type	Status	Notes	Ref
1	4×100 m freestyle	3:03.03	2018 World Short Course Championships	December 11, 2018	Hangzhou, China	AM, NR	Current	WR	
2	4×50 m mixed freestyle	1:27.89	2018 World Short Course Championships	December 12, 2018	Hangzhou, China	AM, NR	Current	WR	
3	4×50 m freestyle	1:21.80	2018 World Short Course Championships	December 14, 2018	Hangzhou, China	AM, NR	Current	WR	
4	4×50 m medley	1:30.90	2018 World Short Course Championships	December 15, 2018	Hangzhou, China	NR	Former		
5	4×100 m medley	3:19.98	2018 World Short Course Championships	December 16, 2018	Hangzhou, China	AM, NR	Former		
6	4×200 m freestyle	6:47.00	2021 World Short Course Championships	December 19, 2021	Abu Dhabi, United Arab Emirates	NR	Current		
7	4×50 m medley (2)	1:30.51	2021 World Short Course Championships	December 20, 2021	Abu Dhabi, United Arab Emirates	AM, NR	Current		

Legend: WR – World record; AM – Americas record; e – equalled existing record; NR – American record;
Records not set in finals: h – heat; sf – semifinal; r – relay 1st leg; rh – relay heat 1st leg; b – B final; † – en route to final mark; so – swim-off; tt – time trial

== Masters world records ==
=== Short course meters (25 m pool) ===
No.	Event	Time	Meet	Location	Date	Age	Age Group	Ref
1	50 m freestyle	21.28	2021 Ron Johnson Masters Championship	Tempe, Arizona	November 20, 2021	26 years, 146 days	25–29	

== Awards and honors ==
- Swimming World, Top 12 Masters Swimmers of the Year: 2021
- Swimming World, The Week That Was: November 1, 2021 (#2)
- SwimSwam Top 100 (Men's): 2021 (#62), 2022 (#90)
- Golden Goggle Award, Relay Performance of the Year: 2016 (4×100 meter freestyle relay)

== Personal life ==
In October 2021, Held publicly announced his engagement to Lexie Lupton, who he trained with during part of his time competing collegiately for the NC State Wolfpack. Held then married Lupton in December 2022.

== See also ==
- World record progression 4 × 100 metres freestyle relay
- World record progression 4 × 50 metres freestyle relay
- List of World Swimming Championships (25 m) medalists (men)
