= 2016 FINA World Swimming Championships (25 m) – Men's 50 metre freestyle =

Men's 50 metre freestyle at the 2016 FINA World Swimming Championships (25 m)
- Venue: WFCU Centre
- Dates: 8 December (heats and semifinals); 9 December (final)
- Competitors: 139 from 100 nations
- Winning time: 21.10

Medalists
gold medal	Jesse Puts	Netherlands
silver medal	Vladimir Morozov	Russia
bronze medal	Simonas Bilis	Lithuania

The Men's 50 metre freestyle competition of the 2016 FINA World Swimming Championships (25 m) was held on 8 and 9 December 2016.

== Records ==
Prior to the competition, the existing world and championship records were as follows.

	Name	Nation	Time	Location	Date
World record Championship record	Florent Manaudou	France	20.26	Doha	5 December 2014

== Results ==
=== Heats ===
The heats were held at 10:40.

Rank	Heat	Lane	Name	Nationality	Time	Notes
1	16	4	Vladimir Morozov	Russia	21.27	Q
2	14	1	Douglas Erasmus	South Africa	21.31	Q
3	14	4	Jesse Puts	Netherlands	21.42	Q
4	15	0	Simonas Bilis	Lithuania	21.43	Q
5	16	2	Kenta Ito	Japan	21.45	Q
6	13	4	Kristian Golomeev	Greece	21.47	Q
7	14	7	Luca Dotto	Italy	21.50	Q
8	16	5	Michael Chadwick	United States	21.56	Q
9	14	2	Daniel Hunter	New Zealand	21.59	Q
9	16	7	Maksim Lobanovskii	Hungary	21.59	Q
11	14	3	Paul Powers	United States	21.60	Q
12	16	0	Mislav Sever	Croatia	21.63	Q
13	14	6	Aleksei Brianskiy	Russia	21.67	Q
13	16	9	Andrii Khloptsov	Ukraine	21.67	Q
15	15	5	Clément Mignon	France	21.69	Q
16	14	5	Ari-Pekka Liukkonen	Finland	21.71	Q
17	13	0	Yuri Kisil	Canada	21.72	
18	15	6	Shinri Shioura	Japan	21.74	
19	15	8	Miguel Ortiz-Cañavate	Spain	21.77	
20	13	8	Brayden McCarthy	Australia	21.78	
21	15	3	Brad Tandy	South Africa	21.79	
22	15	4	Andrii Govorov	Ukraine	21.81	
23	16	1	Yonel Govindin	France	21.83	
23	16	3	Pieter Timmers	Belgium	21.83	
25	10	0	Anders Lie Nielsen	Denmark	21.86	
26	11	6	Daniel Carranza	Mexico	21.88	
26	15	1	Mindaugas Sadauskas	Lithuania	21.88	
28	14	8	Oussama Sahnoune	Algeria	21.89	
28	15	7	Anton Latkin	Belarus	21.89	
30	12	6	Miguel Nascimento	Portugal	21.92	
31	16	8	Artsiom Machekim	Belarus	21.94	
32	14	0	Nyls Korstanje	Netherlands	21.95	
32	16	6	Nicholas Santos	Brazil	21.95	
34	12	8	Yu Hexin	China	21.99	
35	15	2	Jasper Aerents	Belgium	22.07	
36	14	9	Andrei Tuomola	Finland	22.11	
37	12	7	Alexander Graham	Australia	22.14	
38	12	3	Luis Armando Flores Bellina	Puerto Rico	22.22	
39	13	2	Yongqing Lin	China	22.24	
39	15	9	Cristoffer Carlsen	Sweden	22.24	
41	13	5	Norbert Trandafir	Romania	22.32	
42	13	6	Adi Mesetovic	Bosnia and Herzegovina	22.34	
43	13	7	Robin Andreasson	Sweden	22.41	
44	12	4	Mazen Elkamash	Egypt	22.42	
44	13	1	Matthew Zammit	Malta	22.42	
46	12	1	Khader Baqlah	Jordan	22.45	
47	12	0	Oliver Elliot	Chile	22.46	
48	12	2	Baslakov Iskender	Turkey	22.47	
49	12	9	Justin Plaschka	Jamaica	22.51	
49	13	9	Mirando Richard-Jarry	Canada	22.51	
51	1	7	Kai Quan Yeo	Singapore	22.68	
52	13	3	Vladimir Stefanik	Slovakia	22.72	
53	10	3	Pavel Izbiscuic	Moldova	22.78	
53	10	5	Juan Dobles	Costa Rica	22.78	
55	10	4	Aron Orn Stefansson	Iceland	22.87	
56	10	9	Kevin Avila	Guatemala	22.94	
57	11	0	Xander Skinner	Namibia	23.05	
58	9	6	Marko Blazhevski	Macedonia	23.07	
59	8	5	Moktar Al-Yamani	Yemen	23.10	
60	9	3	Sam Seghers	Papua New Guinea	23.19	
60	11	2	Anthony Barbar	Lebanon	23.19	
62	6	9	Kyle Abeysinghe	Sri Lanka	23.23	
63	9	4	Ralph Goveia	Zambia	23.27	
63	9	7	Abdoul Niane	Senegal	23.27	
65	10	7	Matt Galea	Malta	23.31	
66	11	1	Vahan Mkhitaryan	Armenia	23.32	
67	11	9	Jean-Luc Joel Zephir	Saint Lucia	23.34	
68	11	7	Arsham Mirzaei	Iran	23.41	
69	6	1	Ljupcho Angelovski	Macedonia	23.43	
70	9	2	Jhonny Perez	Dominican Republic	23.44	
71	11	8	Dylan Koo	Singapore	23.47	
72	9	0	Adrian Hoek	Curaçao	23.50	
72	9	1	Alex Sobers	Barbados	23.50	
74	7	5	Axel Toni Steven Ngui	Philippines	23.52	
75	10	8	Vladimir Mamikonyan	Armenia	23.61	
76	10	2	Hilal Hemed Hilal	Tanzania	23.63	
77	11	3	Stanislav Karnaukhov	Kyrgyzstan	23.64	
78	9	9	Ivo Kunzle Savastano	Paraguay	23.69	
78	10	6	Mathieu Marquet	Mauritius	23.69	
80	7	8	Stanford Kawale	Papua New Guinea	23.70	
81	8	1	Jeancarlo Calderon Harper	Panama	23.74	
81	8	6	Issa Abdulla Hemed Mohamed	Kenya	23.74	
81	8	9	Eric Fernandez Malvar	Andorra	23.74	
84	7	7	Joao Matias	Angola	23.84	
85	7	3	Markos Kalopsidiotis	Cyprus	23.85	
86	9	8	Mathias Zacarias	Paraguay	23.88	
87	6	3	Alfonso Jose Leso Bautista	Philippines	23.92	
87	8	2	Ivan Soruco	Bolivia	23.92	
89	11	4	Pok Man Ngou	Macau	23.94	
90	10	1	Adam Ismail Allouche	Lebanon	23.97	
91	8	3	Christian Nikles	Brunei	23.98	
92	1	6	Mohammad Mahfizur Rahman	Bangladesh	24.05	
93	1	5	Sébastien Kouma	Mali	24.08	
94	6	6	Dean Hoffmann	Seychelles	24.13	
95	6	8	Alex Mccallum	Cayman Islands	24.14	
95	8	0	Delgerkhuu Myagmar	Mongolia	24.14	
95	8	4	Stefano Mitchell	Antigua and Barbuda	24.14	
98	8	7	Jim Sanderson	Gibraltar	24.15	
99	7	6	Steven Kimani Maina	Kenya	24.24	
100	6	5	George Jabbour	Honduras	24.29	
101	1	3	Yeziel Morales Miranda	Puerto Rico	24.30	
102	5	8	Samuele Rossi	Seychelles	24.37	
103	1	2	Irakli Revishvili	Georgia	24.39	
104	8	8	Marco Flores	Honduras	24.42	
105	7	9	Abdullah Nahmad Naji Al-Doori	Iraq	24.51	
106	5	0	Matthew Ives	Botswana	24.52	
107	7	0	Syed Muhammad Haseeb Tariq	Pakistan	24.69	
108	6	4	Andrew Fowler	Guyana	24.72	
109	7	1	Nuno Miguel Rola	Angola	24.90	
110	5	1	Temaruata Strickland	Cook Islands	24.93	
111	4	5	Adil Bharmal	Tanzania	25.36	
111	6	9	David Hitchcock	Gibraltar	25.36	
113	4	8	Tanner Poppe	Guam	25.40	
114	6	2	Nabeel Hatoum	Palestine	25.49	
115	3	1	Olim Kurbanov	Tajikistan	25.51	
116	5	6	Daryl Appleton	Antigua and Barbuda	25.52	
117	5	2	Ibrahim Nishwan	Maldives	25.73	
118	5	3	Mark Hoare	Eswatini	25.85	
119	4	6	Cruz Halbich	Saint Vincent and the Grenadines	26.04	
120	4	1	Thol Thoeun	Cambodia	26.13	
121	5	4	Arnold Kisulo	Uganda	26.15	
122	3	2	Salofi Charles Welch	Northern Mariana Islands	26.17	
123	4	9	Christian Villacrusis	Northern Mariana Islands	26.18	
124	3	0	Michael Swift	Malawi	26.22	
125	3	5	Pirort Cheng	Cambodia	26.24	
126	5	7	Devin Tyrek Boodha	Saint Lucia	26.29	
127	3	6	Meritum Veliu	Kosovo	26.33	
127	5	9	Aaron De Freitas	Saint Vincent and the Grenadines	26.33	
129	4	0	Albarchir Mouctar	Niger	26.34	
130	3	3	Tongli Panuve	Tonga	26.40	
131	3	4	Slava Sihanouvong	Laos	26.72	
132	2	5	Sergey Sihanouvong	Laos	27.04	
133	2	9	Ismail Muthasim Adnan	Maldives	27.15	
134	2	4	Alijon Khairulloev	Tajikistan	27.62	
135	3	7	Pap Jonga	Gambia	28.46	
136	2	3	Simphiwe Dlamini	Eswatini	28.92	
137	2	7	Christian Djidagul Nassif	Central African Republic	29.60	
138	2	1	Frantz Dorsainvil	Haiti	30.22	
	1	1	Roland Zouetaba	Burkina Faso		DNS
	1	4	Loly Juwaihan	Palestine		DNS
	2	0	Mawouna Bidah	Togo		DNS
	2	2	Koroma Ishmael	Sierra Leone		DNS
	2	6	Mamadou Tahirou Bah	Guinea		DNS
	2	8	Mamadou Alpha Diallo	Guinea		DNS
	3	8	Emeric Kpegba	Togo		DNS
	3	9	Jefferson Kpanou	Benin		DNS
	4	2	Tindwende Sawadogo	Burkina Faso		DNS
	4	3	Athoumane Athoumane	Comoros		DNS
	4	4	Chaolli Aonzoudine	Comoros		DNS
	4	7	Sirish Gurung	Nepal		DNS
	5	5	Belly-Cresus Ganira	Burundi		DNS
	6	0	Ekirilkubinza Joshua Tibatenwa	Uganda		DNS
	7	2	Abeiku Jackson	Ghana		DNS
	7	4	Darren Chan Chin Wah	Mauritius		DNS
	11	5	Aleksey Tarasenko	Uzbekistan		DNS
	12	5	Meli Malani	Fiji		DNS
	9	5	Angelo Simic	Bosnia and Herzegovina		DSQ

=== Semifinals ===
The semifinals were held at 19:07.

==== Semifinal 1 ====
Rank	Lane	Name	Nationality	Time	Notes
1	5	Simonas Bilis	Lithuania	21.15	Q
2	8	Ari-Pekka Liukkonen	Finland	21.36	Q
3	3	Kristian Golomeev	Greece	21.50	
3	6	Michael Chadwick	United States	21.50	
5	2	Maksim Lobanovskii	Hungary	21.52	
6	7	Mislav Sever	Croatia	21.62	
7	1	Andrii Khloptsov	Ukraine	21.68	
8	4	Douglas Erasmus	South Africa	21.71	

==== Semifinal 2 ====
Rank	Lane	Name	Nationality	Time	Notes
1	4	Vladimir Morozov	Russia	21.05	Q
2	6	Luca Dotto	Italy	21.29	Q
3	8	Clément Mignon	France	21.30	Q
4	7	Paul Powers	United States	21.31	Q
5	5	Jesse Puts	Netherlands	21.33	Q
6	1	Aleksei Brianskiy	Russia	21.44	Q
7	3	Kenta Ito	Japan	21.65	
8	2	Daniel Hunter	New Zealand	21.70	

=== Final ===
The final was held at 19:32.

Rank	Lane	Name	Nationality	Time	Notes
1st place, gold medalist(s)	7	Jesse Puts	Netherlands	21.10	
2nd place, silver medalist(s)	4	Vladimir Morozov	Russia	21.14	
3rd place, bronze medalist(s)	5	Simonas Bilis	Lithuania	21.23	
4	6	Clément Mignon	France	21.28	
5	1	Ari-Pekka Liukkonen	Finland	21.29	
6	3	Luca Dotto	Italy	21.39	
7	2	Paul Powers	United States	21.43	
8	8	Aleksei Brianskiy	Russia	21.46	
