= Swimming at the 2020 European Aquatics Championships – Women's 4 × 100 metre medley relay =

Women's 4 × 100 metre medley relay at the 2020 European Aquatics Championships
- Venue: Danube Arena
- Dates: 23 May 2021
- Competitors: 98 from 22 nations
- Teams: 22
- Winning time: 3:54.01

Medalists
gold medal	Kathleen Dawson; Molly Renshaw; Laura Stephens; Anna Hopkin; Cassie Wild; Sarah Vasey; Harriet Jones; Freya Anderson	Great Britain
silver medal	Maria Kameneva; Yuliya Yefimova; Svetlana Chimrova; Arina Surkova; Anastasia Fesikova; Evgeniia Chikunova	Russia
bronze medal	Margherita Panziera; Arianna Castiglioni; Elena Di Liddo; Federica Pellegrini; Silvia Scalia; Martina Carraro; Silvia Di Pietro	Italy

The Women's 4 × 100 metre medley relay competition of the 2020 European Aquatics Championships was held on 23 May 2021.

== Records ==
Before the competition, the existing world, European and championship records were as follows.

	Team	Time	Location	Date
World record	United States	3:50.40	Gwangju	28 July 2019
European record	Russia	3:53.38	Budapest	30 July 2017
Championship record	Russia	3:54.22	Glasgow	9 August 2018

The following new records were set during this competition.

Date	Event	Nation	Time	Record
23 May	Final	Great Britain	3:54.01	CR

== Results ==
=== Heats ===
The heats were started at 11:08.

Rank	Heat	Lane	Nation	Swimmers	Time	Notes
1	1	3	Netherlands	Kira Toussaint (59.51); Tes Schouten (1:07.84); Maaike de Waard (58.25); Femke Heemskerk (53.07)	3:58.67	Q
2	2	6	Russia	Anastasia Fesikova (1:00.25); Evgeniia Chikunova (1:06.84); Svetlana Chimrova (56.98); Arina Surkova (54.71)	3:58.78	Q
3	2	4	Sweden	Hanna Rosvall (1:02.70); Sophie Hansson (1:06.21); Louise Hansson (56.71); Michelle Coleman (53.74)	3:59.36	Q
4	2	5	Italy	Silvia Scalia (1:01.65); Martina Carraro (1:06.30); Elena Di Liddo (58.05); Silvia Di Pietro (54.26)	4:00.26	Q
5	3	5	Great Britain	Cassie Wild (1:00.47); Sarah Vasey (1:06.98); Harriet Jones (58.47); Freya Anderson (54.47)	4:00.39	Q
6	1	4	Finland	Mimosa Jallow (1:00.41); Ida Hulkko (1:06.38); Laura Lahtinen (1:00.30); Fanny Teijonsalo (54.57)	4:01.66	Q
7	3	7	Belarus	Anastasiya Shkurdai (1:00.14); Alina Zmushka (1:07.15); Anastasiya Kuliashova (58.67); Nastassia Karakouskaya (55.96)	4:01.92	Q, NR
8	3	0	Denmark	Karoline Sørensen (1:02.29); Clara Rybak-Andersen (1:08.24); Emilie Beckmann (57.52); Signe Bro (53.92)	4:01.97	Q
9	3	2	Spain	África Zamorano (1:01.48); Jessica Vall (1:07.12); Aina Hierro (59.79); Lidón Muñoz (53.99)	4:02.38	NR
10	3	8	France	Mathilde Cini (1:01.27); Justine Delmas (1:08.22); Marie Wattel (58.20); Assia Touati (54.74)	4:02.43	
11	2	1	Ireland	Danielle Hill (1:01.07); Mona McSharry (1:06.44); Ellen Walshe (59.72); Victoria Catterson (55.70)	4:02.93	NR
12	3	9	Switzerland	Nina Kost (1:00.85); Lisa Mamié (1:08.14); Maria Ugolkova (58.76); Noémi Girardet (55.56)	4:03.31	
13	3	6	Turkey	Ekaterina Avramova (1:01.25); Viktoriya Zeynep Güneş (1:07.38); Nida Eliz Üstündağ (1:00.62); Selen Özbilen (54.76)	4:04.01	
14	2	2	Hungary	Réka Nyirádi (1:02.80); Petra Halmai (1:07.56); Dalma Sebestyén (59.19); Fanni Gyurinovics (54.59)	4:04.14	
15	3	1	Czech Republic	Simona Kubová (1:01.00); Kristýna Horská (1:09.31); Barbora Janíčková (1:00.37); Barbora Seemanová (53.64)	4:04.32	
16	3	3	Slovakia	Emma Marušáková (1:04.20); Andrea Podmaníková (1:08.37); Tamara Potocká (1:00.04); Teresa Ivanová (55.77)	4:08.38	NR
17	2	8	Belgium	Jade Smits (1:02.78); Josephine Dumont (1:09.50); Kimberly Buys (59.01); Lana Ravelingien (57.21)	4:08.50	
18	3	4	Slovenia	Janja Šegel (1:03.44); Tjaša Vozel (1:09.80); Katja Fain (1:01.61); Neža Klančar (54.93)	4:09.78	NR
19	2	3	Latvia	Arina Baikova (1:03.11); Arina Sisojeva (1:10.07); Ieva Maļuka (1:02.23); Gabriela Ņikitina (56.16)	4:11.57	NR
20	1	5	Austria	Caroline Pilhatsch (1:03.05); Cornelia Pammer (1:12.56); Lena Kreundl (1:00.48); Lena Opatril (56.83)	4:12.92	
	2	7	Greece	Ioanna Sacha (1:02.73); Maria Drasidou; Anna Ntountounaki; Theodora Drakou	Disqualified	
	2	0	Poland	Paulina Peda (1:00.66); Dominika Sztandera (1:08.17); Klaudia Naziębło (59.61); Katarzyna Wasick	Disqualified	

=== Final ===
The final was held at 19:21.

Rank	Lane	Nation	Swimmers	Time	Notes
1st place, gold medalist(s)	2	Great Britain	Kathleen Dawson (58.08 ER); Molly Renshaw (1:05.72); Laura Stephens (57.55); Anna Hopkin (52.66)	3:54.01	CR, NR
2nd place, silver medalist(s)	5	Russia	Maria Kameneva (59.47); Yuliya Yefimova (1:05.77); Svetlana Chimrova (56.78); Arina Surkova (54.23)	3:56.25	
3rd place, bronze medalist(s)	6	Italy	Margherita Panziera (59.71); Arianna Castiglioni (1:05.66); Elena Di Liddo (57.27); Federica Pellegrini (53.66)	3:56.30	NR
4	3	Sweden	Michelle Coleman (1:00.00); Sophie Hansson (1:05.45); Louise Hansson (56.79); Sara Junevik (54.30)	3:56.54	
5	4	Netherlands	Kira Toussaint (59.76); Tes Schouten (1:07.93); Maaike de Waard (57.53); Femke Heemskerk (52.19)	3:57.41	
6	1	Belarus	Anastasiya Shkurdai (59.53); Alina Zmushka (1:06.64); Anastasiya Kuliashova (58.30); Nastassia Karakouskaya (55.90)	4:00.37	NR
7	7	Finland	Mimosa Jallow (1:00.47); Ida Hulkko (1:06.67); Laura Lahtinen (1:00.60); Fanny Teijonsalo (54.22)	4:01.96	
	8	Denmark	Karoline Sørensen (1:02.04); Clara Rybak-Andersen (1:07.92); Emilie Beckmann; Signe Bro	Disqualified	
