= Matheus Santana =

Brazilian swimmer (born 1996)

Personal information
- Full name: Matheus Paulo de Santana
- Nationality: Brazil
- Born: 2 April 1996 (age 30) Rio de Janeiro, Rio de Janeiro, Brazil
- Height: 1.91 m (6 ft 3 in)
- Weight: 91 kg (201 lb)

Sport
- Sport: Swimming
- Strokes: Freestyle
- Club: DC Trident; UNISANTA
Medal record
Men's swimming
Representing Brazil
World Championships (SC)
Bronze medal – third place	2018 Hangzhou	4×100 m freestyle
Bronze medal – third place	2018 Hangzhou	4×50 m medley
Pan American Games
Gold medal – first place	2015 Toronto	4×100 m freestyle
South American Games
Gold medal – first place	2014 Santiago	100 m freestyle
Gold medal – first place	2014 Santiago	4×100 m freestyle
Gold medal – first place	2014 Santiago	4×100 m medley
Youth Olympic Games
Gold medal – first place	2014 Nanjing	100 m freestyle
Silver medal – second place	2014 Nanjing	50 m freestyle
Silver medal – second place	2014 Nanjing	4×100 m mixed freestyle

Matheus Paulo de Santana (born 2 April 1996 in Rio de Janeiro, Brazil) is a Brazilian swimmer. He will represent DC Trident at the International Swimming League during the 2020 season.

== International career ==
Santana started competing in national championships in 2008. His first national title came in the Youth I category, in November 2011. Santana swam for the Brazilian team in Multinations, at Corfu, Greece, in 2012. At the 2013 Youth South American Championships in Chile, he won the 100-metre freestyle and finished third in the 50-metre freestyle.

=== 2013–16 ===
Santana was classified to the 2013 FINA World Junior Swimming Championships in Dubai, but was cut because of diabetes.

At the 2014 South American Games in Santiago, Chile, Santana won three gold medals in the 100-metre freestyle, 4 × 100-metre freestyle and 4 × 100-metre medley, breaking the competition record in all of them.

At the 2014 Maria Lenk Trophy in São Paulo, Santana broke the Junior world record twice in the 100-metre freestyle, with a time of 48.85 in the heats and 48.61 in the final. He qualified for the 2014 Pan Pacific Swimming Championships, but decided not to participate in this tournament due to the 2014 Summer Youth Olympics.

At the Brazilian Junior and Senior Swimming Championships in May 2014, he broke the Junior world record in the 100-metre freestyle again, with a time of 48.35, the sixth best time in the world in 2014 in the event.

At the 2014 Summer Youth Olympics in Nanjing, he won a silver medal in the Mixed 4 × 100m freestyle relay. In the 50 metre freestyle, he won a silver medal with a time of 22.43, far from his best time. In the 100 metre freestyle, Santana won the gold and broke for the Junior world record for the fourth time, with a time of 48.25, the fifth fastest time in the world in 2014.

At the 2015 Pan American Games in Toronto, Ontario, Canada, Santana won the gold medal in the 4 × 100-metre freestyle relay (where he broke the Pan American Games record with a time of 3:13.66, along with Marcelo Chierighini, João de Lucca and Bruno Fratus). He also finished 7th in the 100-metre freestyle.

At the 2015 World Aquatics Championships in Kazan, Santana finished 4th in the Men's 4 × 100 metre freestyle relay, again along with Marcelo Chierighini, Bruno Fratus and João de Lucca. César Cielo didn't swim the final - despite participating in the championships, he was feeling shoulder pain this day. In the Men's 100 metre freestyle, he finished 9th with a time of 48.52, almost going to the final. He also finished 6th in the 4 × 100 metre mixed freestyle relay, along with Bruno Fratus, Larissa Oliveira and Daynara de Paula, breaking the South American record with a time of 3:25.58.

=== 2016 Summer Olympics ===
Santana competed at the 2016 Summer Olympics, where he helped the Brazilian Men's 4 × 100 metre freestyle relay to go to the final.

=== 2017–20 ===
At the 2018 FINA World Swimming Championships (25 m) in Hangzhou, China, Santana, along with César Cielo, Marcelo Chierighini and Breno Correia, won the bronze medal in the Men's 4 × 100 metre freestyle relay, with a time of 3:05.15, setting a South American record. He won another bronze medal in the Men's 4 × 50 metre medley relay, by participating at heats. He also finished 5th in the Mixed 4 × 50 metre freestyle relay, 17th in the Men's 50 metre butterfly and 26th in the Men's 50 metre freestyle.
