= Shang Keyuan =

Chinese swimmer (born 1995)

Personal information
- Native name: 商 科元
- Nationality: Chinese
- Born: 4 February 1995 (age 31)

Sport
- Sport: Swimming
Medal record
World Championships (SC)
Bronze medal – third place	2018 Hangzhou	4×200 m freestyle
Asian Games
Silver medal – second place	2018 Jakarta	4×200 m freestyle

Shang Keyuan (Chinese: 商 科元, born 4 February 1995) is a Chinese swimmer. He competed in the men's 200 metre freestyle event at the 2016 Summer Olympics.
