= Evgeny Sedov =

Russian swimmer

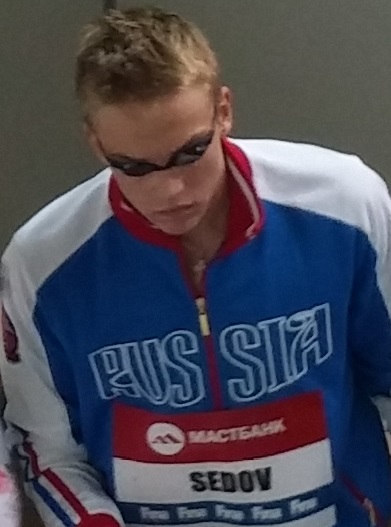

Personal information
- National team: Russia
- Born: January 29, 1996 (age 30)

Sport
- Sport: Swimming
- Strokes: Freestyle, Butterfly
Medal record
Men's swimming
Representing Russia
World Championships (SC)
Gold medal – first place	2014 Doha	4×50 m freestyle
Silver medal – second place	2014 Doha	4×50 m mixed freestyle
Silver medal – second place	2018 Hangzhou	4×50 m freestyle
Bronze medal – third place	2018 Hangzhou	4×50 m mixed freestyle
European Championships (SC)
Gold medal – first place	2015 Netanya	50 m freestyle
Gold medal – first place	2015 Netanya	4×50 m freestyle
Silver medal – second place	2015 Netanya	4×50 m medley
Silver medal – second place	2015 Netanya	4×50 m mixed freestyle
World Junior Championships
Gold medal – first place	2013 Dubai	4×100 m mixed medley
Silver medal – second place	2013 Dubai	50 m freestyle
Silver medal – second place	2013 Dubai	4×100 m medley
Bronze medal – third place	2013 Dubai	100 m freestyle
Bronze medal – third place	2013 Dubai	4×100 m freestyle
Bronze medal – third place	2013 Dubai	4×100 m mixed freestyle
Military World Games
Bronze medal – third place	2019 Wuhan	4×100 m freestyle

Evgeny Vadimovich Sedov (Russian: Евгений Вадимович Седов; born 29 January 1996) is a Russian competitive swimmer. Sedov and his teammates won the gold medal in the 4×50 m freestyle relay at the 2014 short course world championships in Doha, breaking the world record. Together with his teammates, he also broke the 4×50 meter medley relay world record in the heats, but this record was broken in the final by Brazil.

At the 2015 European Short Course Championships Sedov won his first international senior medal in an individual event, winning the gold medal in the 50 meter freestyle, 0.05 ahead of Marco Orsi of Italy.
