= Arina Surkova =

Russian swimmer

Personal information
- Full name: Arina Aleksandrovna Surkova
- National team: Russia; Authorised Neutral Athletes (since 2024)
- Born: 17 July 1998 (age 28) Novokuznetsk, Russia

Sport
- Sport: Swimming
- Strokes: butterfly, freestyle
- Coach: Alexander Martynov
Medal record
Women's swimming
Representing Neutral Athletes B
World Championships (SC)
Gold medal – first place	2024 Budapest	4×50 m mixed medley
Gold medal – first place	2024 Budapest	4×100 m mixed medley
European Championships (LC)
Bronze medal – third place	2026 Paris	4×100 m medley
Bronze medal – third place	2026 Paris	4×100 m mixed medley
Representing Russian Swimming Federation
World Championships (SC)
Bronze medal – third place	2021 Abu Dhabi	4×50 m mixed freestyle
Representing Russia
World Championships (SC)
Bronze medal – third place	2018 Hangzhou	4×50 m mixed freestyle
Bronze medal – third place	2018 Hangzhou	4×50 m mixed medley
European Championships (LC)
Silver medal – second place	2020 Budapest	4×100 m medley
Bronze medal – third place	2020 Budapest	4×200 m mixed freestyle
European Championships (SC)
Gold medal – first place	2019 Glasgow	4×50 m mixed freestyle
Gold medal – first place	2019 Glasgow	4×50 m mixed medley
Gold medal – first place	2021 Kazan	4×50 m freestyle
Gold medal – first place	2021 Kazan	4×50 m medley
Bronze medal – third place	2019 Glasgow	4×50 m medley
Bronze medal – third place	2021 Kazan	4×50 m mixed medley

Arina Aleksandrovna Surkova (Russian: Арина Александровна Суркова; born 17 July 1998) is a Russian swimmer specializing in freestyle and butterfly. She won two bronze medals at the 2018 World Championships (25 m).

== Career ==
Surkova is coached by Alexander Martynov.

She was selected as a part of Russian team for 2018 World Championships (25 m) in China. She swam in prelims and then Russian team won bronze medal so Arina also became a bronze medallist. Then she won a second bronze medal at mixed medley relay.

In 2019, she represented Russia at the 2019 World Aquatics Championships held in Gwangju, South Korea.

Arina was part of the New York Breakers Team of the International Swimming League in 2020.
