= Roman Shevliakov =

Russian swimmer (born 1998)

Personal information
- Nationality: Russian
- Born: 26 August 1998 (age 28) Engels, Saratov Oblast, Russia
- Height: 1.90 m (6 ft 3 in)
- Weight: 85 kg (187 lb)

Sport
- Sport: Swimming
- Strokes: Butterfly
Medal record
Men's swimming
Representing Neutral Athletes B
European Championships (LC)
Gold medal – first place	2026 Paris	4×100 m medley
Representing Russian Swimming Federation
World Championships (SC)
Bronze medal – third place	2021 Abu Dhabi	4×100 m medley
Representing Russia
World Championships (SC)
Gold medal – first place	2018 Hangzhou	4×50 m medley
European Games
Gold medal – first place	2015 Baku	4×100 m mixed medley
European Junior Championships
Silver medal – second place	2016 Hódmezővásárhely	100 m butterfly
Silver medal – second place	2016 Hódmezővásárhely	4×100 m medley

Roman Sergeevich Shevliakov (Russian: Роман Сергеевич Шевляков; born 26 August 1998) is a Russian swimmer.

== Junior career ==
Roman started the international career at the European Junior Swimming Championships 2015, being held as an aquatic part of 2015 European Games in Baku, Azerbaijan. He participated in men's 50 metre butterfly, men's 100 metre butterfly, men's 200 metre butterfly events and won a gold medal in mixed 4 × 100 metre medley relay.

One year later, Roman Shevliakov was included in the Russian national team for the 2016 European Junior Swimming Championships in Hódmezővásárhely, Hungary. He competed in men's 50 metre butterfly and men's 200 metre butterfly events, and won two silver medals in men's 100 metre butterfly and men's 4 x 100 metre medley relay events.

Later, in September 2016, Roman was headed into his first World Cup season. He started at his traditional distances of men's 50, 100 and 200 metre butterfly, along with the men's 200 metre medley event.

== Senior career ==
The first World Cup season in a senior status brought him a bronze medal in the mixed 4 x 50 metre freestyle relay. In this Moscow meet, Roman also started in the men's 50 metre and 100 metre butterfly, men's 50 metre freestyle, men's 50 metre backstroke and mixed 4 x 50 metre medley relay.

He competed in the men's 50 metre butterfly, men's 100 metre butterfly, men's 200 metre butterfly and men's 4 × 50 metre medley relay events at the 2018 FINA World Swimming Championships (25 m), in Hangzhou, China.
