= Kaiya Seki =

Japanese swimmer (born 1999)

Personal information
- Nationality: Japanese
- Born: 24 December 1999 (age 25); Tokyo, Japan

Sport
- Sport: Swimming
- Club: Nihon University

Kaiya Seki (Japanese: 関 海哉, Seki Kaiya; born 24 December 1999) is a Japanese swimmer. He competed in the men's 100 metre freestyle event at the 2018 FINA World Swimming Championships (25 m), in Hangzhou, China. He qualified to represent Japan at the 2020 Summer Olympics.
