= Yuliya Khitraya =

Belarusian swimmer

Personal information
- Full name: Yuliya Piatrouna Khitraya
- Nationality: Belarusian
- Born: 11 September 1989 (age 37) Baranovichi, Belarusian SSR, Soviet Union
- Height: 1.80 m (5 ft 11 in)
- Weight: 66 kg (146 lb)

Sport
- Sport: Swimming
- Event: Freestyle
- Club: Brest SC
Medal record
Women's swimming
Representing Belarus
European Championships (SC)
Silver medal – second place	2017 Copenhagen	4×50 m mixed medley
Bronze medal – third place	2012 Chartres	4×50 m freestyle

Yuliya Piatrouna Khitraya (Belarusian: Юлія Пятроўна Хітрая; Łacinka: Julija Piatroŭna Chitraja; born 11 September 1989) is a Belarusian swimmer, who specialized in sprint freestyle events. She won a bronze medal, as a member of the Belarusian swimming team, in the women's 4×50 m freestyle at the 2012 European Short Course Swimming Championships in Chartres, France.

Khitraya represented Belarus at the 2012 Summer Olympics in London, where she qualified for the women's 4 × 100 m freestyle relay, along with her teammates Aksana Dziamidava, Sviatlana Khakhlova, and double Olympic silver medalist Aliaksandra Herasimenia. Swimming the anchor leg, Khitraya posted her time of 55.92 seconds, and the Belarusian team went on to finish the first heat in seventh place and thirteenth overall, setting a new national record time of 3:40.67.
