= Aksana Dziamidava =

Belarusian swimmer (born 1993)

Personal information
- Full name: Aksana Yauhenauna Dziamidava
- Nationality: Belarus
- Born: 23 December 1993 (age 32) Minsk, Belarus
- Height: 1.67 m (5 ft 6 in)
- Weight: 54 kg (119 lb)

Sport
- Sport: Swimming
- Event: Freestyle
- Club: Dynamo Minsk
Medal record
Women's swimming
Representing Belarus
European Championships (SC)
Bronze medal – third place	2012 Chartres	4×50 m freestyle

Aksana Yauhenauna Dziamidava (Belarusian: Аксана Яўгенаўна Дзямідава; born 23 December 1993) is a Belarusian swimmer, who specialized in sprint freestyle events. She won a bronze medal, as a member of the Belarusian swimming team, in the women's 4×50 m freestyle at the 2012 European Short Course Swimming Championships in Chartres, France.

Dziamidava represented Belarus at the 2012 Summer Olympics in London, where she qualified for the women's 4 × 100 m freestyle relay, along with her teammates Yuliya Khitraya, Sviatlana Khakhlova, and double Olympic silver medalist Aliaksandra Herasimenia. Swimming the third leg, Dziamidava posted her time of 55.94 seconds, and the Belarusian team went on to finish the first heat in seventh place and thirteenth overall, setting a new national record time of 3:40.67.
