= Louis Townsend =

Australian swimmer

Personal information
- Nationality: Australian
- Born: 3 January 1998 (age 28)

Sport
- Sport: Swimming
- Strokes: Freestyle, breaststroke
Medal record
Men's swimming
Representing Australia
Junior Pan Pacific Championships
Gold medal – first place	2016 Maui	4×200 m freestyle
Silver medal – second place	2016 Maui	200 m freestyle
Silver medal – second place	2016 Maui	4×100 m freestyle
Bronze medal – third place	2016 Maui	100 m freestyle

Louis Townsend (born 3 January 1998) is an Australian swimmer. He competed in the mixed relay at the 2017 FINA World Swimming Championships in Budapest, Hungary. He also competed in the men's 100 metre freestyle event at the 2018 FINA World Swimming Championships (25 m), in Hangzhou, China.
