= Jesse Puts =

Dutch swimmer (born 1994)

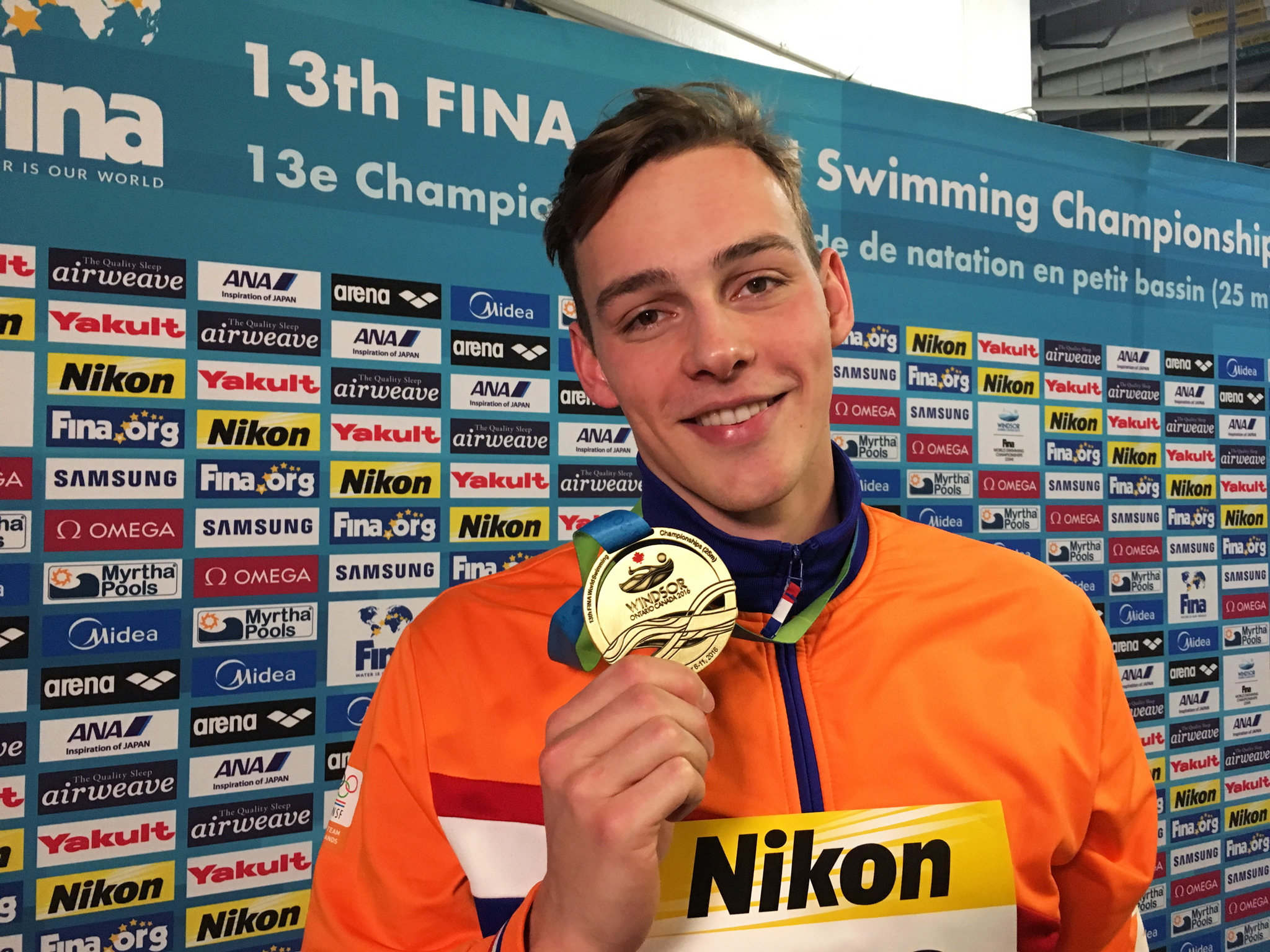
- Puts after winning gold at the 2016 FINA World Swimming Championships

Personal information
- National team: Netherlands
- Born: 1 August 1994 (age 32) Utrecht, Netherlands
- Height: 1.90 m (6 ft 3 in)

Sport
- Sport: Swimming
- Strokes: Freestyle
- Club: Aquarijn
- Coach: Herman van den Berg, Sven Jaeger
Medal record
Men's swimming
Representing Netherlands
World Championships (SC)
Gold medal – first place	2016 Windsor	50 m freestyle
Silver medal – second place	2016 Windsor	4×50 m mixed freestyle
Silver medal – second place	2018 Hangzhou	4×50 m mixed freestyle
Silver medal – second place	2018 Hangzhou	4×50 m mixed medley
Silver medal – second place	2021 Abu Dhabi	4×50 m mixed freestyle
Bronze medal – third place	2021 Abu Dhabi	4×50 m freestyle
European Championships (LC)
Silver medal – second place	2020 Budapest	4×100 m mixed freestyle
European Championships (SC)
Gold medal – first place	2021 Kazan	4x50 m freestyle
Gold medal – first place	2021 Kazan	4x50 m mixed freestyle
Silver medal – second place	2019 Glasgow	4×50 m mixed medley
Bronze medal – third place	2015 Netanya	4×50 m mixed freestyle
Bronze medal – third place	2021 Kazan	4x50 m medley relay

Jesse Puts (Dutch pronunciation: [ˈjɛsə ˈpʏts]; born 1 August 1994) is a Dutch competitive swimmer who specializes in freestyle. He is the 2016 world champion in the 50 meter freestyle (short course). He holds the Dutch records in this event in both long course and short course, as well as in the 100 meter freestyle (short course).

== Career ==
At his international debut during the 2014 European Championships in Berlin, Puts finished eighth on the 50 meter backstroke. In the 50 meter freestyle, Puts swam a 23.31 finishing 6th in his heat. He placed 43rd overall during the prelims, and did not qualify for the semifinals.

At the 2015 European Short Course Swimming Championships held in Netanya, he finished 8th in the 50 meter freestyle with a time of 21.49. In addition, he was eliminated in the 100 meter freestyle heats. On the 4x50 meter medley, together with Sébas van Lith, Maarten Brzoskowski and Ben Schwietert, he did not qualify for the semifinals. Together with Ben Schwietert, Inge Dekker and Ranomi Kromowidjojo, he won the bronze medal in the 4x50 meter freestyle. In the mixed 4x50 meter wisselslag, he finished 4th with Sébas of Lith, Dekker and Kromowidjojo.

During the Open Scottish Championships, in July 2016, Glasgow, Puts matched the long course Dutch record on the 50 meter freestyle of Pieter van den Hoogenband (22.03). He stayed a fraction of a second above the limit (22.00) for participation in the 2016 Olympic Games in Rio de Janeiro. In October 2016, with a time of 21.17 he improved the Dutch record in the 50 meter freestyle of Johan Kenkhuis (21.41) from 2005. Incidentally Puts went below the limit for participation at the 13th FINA World Swimming Championships (25 m) held in December 2016 at Windsor, Ontario, Canada. In Canada, puts became world champion on the 50 meter freestyle short course with a time of 21.10. Together with Nyls Korstanje, Ben Schwietert and Kyle Stolk, he finished fifth on the 4x50 meter freestyle relay. On the mixed 4x50 meter freestyle he obtained together with Nyls Korstanje, Ranomi Kromowidjojo and Maaike de Waard the silver medal with a final time of 1:29.82. One week after the world championships, he twice improved the Dutch record in the 50 meter freestyle at the Amsterdam Swim Meet.

Puts participated in the 17th Fina World Aquatics Championships held in Budapest, Hungary in July 2017. On 28 July Puts swam in heat 13 of the 50 meter freestyle. He swam a 22.28 which placed him 21st in the overall results, which was not enough to have a spot for the semifinals.

== Personal bests ==
Short course
Event	Time	Date	Location
50 m freestyle	20.99	2021-11-04	Kazan, Russia
100 m freestyle	46.52	2021-10-02	Rome, Italy
50 m backstroke	24.01	2018-09-29	Eindhoven, Netherlands
50 m butterfly	22.60	2021-11-05	Kazan, Russia

Long course
Event	Time	Date	Location
50 m freestyle	21.82	2016-12-17	Amsterdam, Netherlands
100 m freestyle	48.99	2022-04-09	Eindhoven, Netherlands
50 m backstroke	25.07	2014-08-20	Berlin, Hungary
50 m butterfly	23.62	2019-04-12	Eindhoven, Netherlands
