= Sergey Fesikov =

Russian swimmer

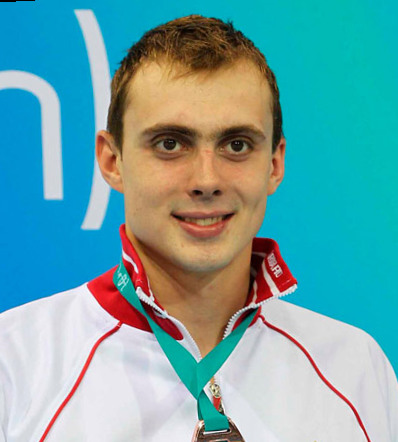
- Sergey Fesikov in 2022

Personal information
- Nationality: Russia
- Born: 21 January 1989 (age 37) Leningrad, Russian SFSR, Soviet Union
- Height: 2.02 m (6 ft 8 in)
- Weight: 102 kg (225 lb)

Sport
- Sport: Swimming
- Strokes: Freestyle, individual medley
- Club: Toronto Titans (ISL 2020)
Medal record
Olympic Games
Bronze medal – third place	2012 London	4×100 m freestyle
World Championships (SC)
Gold medal – first place	2014 Doha	4×50 m freestyle
Silver medal – second place	2010 Dubai	4×100 m freestyle
Silver medal – second place	2010 Dubai	4×100 m medley
Silver medal – second place	2014 Doha	4×100 m freestyle
Silver medal – second place	2018 Hangzhou	4×50 m freestyle
Silver medal – second place	2018 Hangzhou	4×100 m freestyle
Bronze medal – third place	2010 Dubai	100 m medley
European Championships (LC)
Gold medal – first place	2010 Budapest	4×100 m freestyle
Gold medal – first place	2018 Glasgow	4×100 m freestyle
Silver medal – second place	2014 Berlin	4×100 m freestyle
European Championships (SC)
Gold medal – first place	2009 Istanbul	4×50 m medley
Gold medal – first place	2011 Szczecin	100 m freestyle
Gold medal – first place	2013 Herning	4×50 m freestyle
Gold medal – first place	2013 Herning	4×50 m mixed freestyle
Gold medal – first place	2015 Netanya	100 m medley
Gold medal – first place	2017 Copenhagen	4×50 m freestyle
Gold medal – first place	2019 Glasgow	4×50 m freestyle
Gold medal – first place	2019 Glasgow	4×50 m medley
Gold medal – first place	2019 Glasgow	4×50 m mixed medley
Silver medal – second place	2007 Debrecen	4×50 m medley
Silver medal – second place	2009 Istanbul	100 m medley
Silver medal – second place	2011 Szczecin	50 m freestyle
Silver medal – second place	2011 Szczecin	4×50 m freestyle
Silver medal – second place	2011 Szczecin	4×50 m medley
Silver medal – second place	2013 Herning	100 m medley
Silver medal – second place	2017 Copenhagen	100 m medley
Silver medal – second place	2017 Copenhagen	4×50 m mixed freestyle
Silver medal – second place	2019 Glasgow	100 m medley
Silver medal – second place	2021 Kazan	4×50 m medley
Bronze medal – third place	2007 Debrecen	100 m medley
Bronze medal – third place	2009 Istanbul	50 m freestyle
Summer Universiade
Gold medal – first place	2009 Belgrade	100 m freestyle
Gold medal – first place	2013 Kazan	4×100 m freestyle
Silver medal – second place	2009 Belgrade	50 m freestyle
Bronze medal – third place	2017 Taipei	4×100 m freestyle

Sergey Vasilyevich Fesikov (Russian: Серге́й Васильевич Фесиков; born 21 January 1989) is a Russian professional swimmer. He was part of the Russian 4 × 100 m freestyle relay teams that finished in ninth and third place at the 2008 and 2012 Olympics, respectively.

== Career ==
=== International Swimming League ===
In spring 2020, Fesikov signed for the Toronto Titans, the first Canadian based team in the ISL.

=== World Championships ===
2018: Fesikov took home two silver medals from the 2018 FINA World Swimming Championships in Hangzhou, China, as part of the men's freestyle relay team, one in 4 x 50 m and the other in the 4 × 100 m.

2014: At the 2014 FINA World Swimming Championships in Doha, Fesikov took home two medals. He won gold in the 4 x 50 m freestyle relay and Silver in the 4 × 100 m freestyle relay.

2012: In 2012, at the London Olympic Games, Fesikov helped the Russian team take the podium with bronze for Russia, in the 4 × 100 m freestyle relay.

2010: At the 2010 FINA World Swimming Championships in Dubai, UAE, Fesikov took home three medals: two silver medals, as part of the men's relay team, in the 4 × 100 m freestyle event and the 4 × 100 m medley event. He also took the bronze in the individual 100 m medley event.

== Personal life ==
Fesikov's parents are former competitive volleyball players. In the 2000s, his father, a renowned volleyball coach, received various job offers in Yaroslavl and Obninsk and moved his family there from Saint Petersburg. In 2010, Fesikov graduated from the Yaroslavl State University with a degree in social studies. In August 2013 he married Anastasia Zuyeva, an Olympic swimmer who also competed at the 2008 and 2012 Games.

== See also ==
- List of Russian records in swimming

Records
Preceded by Ryan Lochte	World Record Holder; Men's 100m Individual Medley (25m); 14 November 2009 – 12 December 2009	Succeeded by Peter Mankoč
Preceded by Tomaso D'Orsogna, Travis Mahoney, Cate Campbell, Bronte Campbell	Mixed 4 × 50 metres freestyle relay world record-holder 14 December 2013 – 6 December 2014; With: Vladimir Morozov, Rozaliya Nasretdinova, Veronika Popova	Succeeded by Josh Schneider, Matt Grevers, Madison Kennedy, Abbey Weitzeil
