= Ivan Kuzmenko =

Russian swimmer

Personal information
- Nationality: Russian
- Born: 7 April 1995 (age 31)

Sport
- Sport: Swimming
- Strokes: Freestyle
Medal record
World Championships (SC)
Gold medal – first place	2018 Hangzhou	4×50 m medley
Silver medal – second place	2018 Hangzhou	4×50 m freestyle
Silver medal – second place	2018 Hangzhou	4×100 m freestyle
Bronze medal – third place	2018 Hangzhou	4×50 m mixed freestyle
European Championships (LC)
Gold medal – first place	2018 Glasgow	4×100 m freestyle
European Championships (SC)
Gold medal – first place	2017 Copenhagen	4×50 m freestyle

Ivan Kuzmenko (born 7 April 1995) is a Russian swimmer. He competed in the men's 4 × 100 metre freestyle relay event at the 2018 European Aquatics Championships, winning the gold medal.
