= Andrea Vergani =

Italian swimmer (born 1997)

Personal information
- Nationality: Italian
- Born: 15 June 1997 (age 29) Milan, Italy
- Height: 1.87 m (6 ft 2 in)
- Weight: 75 kg (165 lb)

Sport
- Sport: Swimming
- Strokes: Freestyle
Medal record
World Championships (SC)
Bronze medal – third place	2018 Hangzhou	4×50 m freestyle
European Championships (LC)
Bronze medal – third place	2018 Glasgow	50 m freestyle

Andrea Vergani (born 15 June 1997) is an Italian swimmer. He competed in the men's 50 metre freestyle event at the 2018 European Aquatics Championships, winning the bronze medal.
