= Nastassia Karakouskaya =

Belarusian swimmer

Personal information
- Nationality: Belarusian
- Born: 1 August 1996 (age 29)

Sport
- Sport: Swimming

Nastassia Viktarauna Karakouskaya (Belarusian: Настасся Віктараўна Каракоўская; born 1 August 1996) is a Belarusian swimmer. In 2021, she represented Belarus at the 2020 Summer Olympics held in Tokyo, Japan. She competed in the women's 50 metre freestyle event at the 2018 FINA World Swimming Championships (25 m), in Hangzhou, China.
