= Cameron Jones (swimmer) =

Australian swimmer

Personal information
- Full name: Cameron Alexander Jones
- Nationality: Australian
- Born: 7 May 1996 (age 30)

Sport
- Sport: Swimming
- Strokes: Freestyle

Cameron Alexander Jones (born 7 May 1996) is an Australian swimmer. He competed in the men's 50 metre freestyle event at the 2018 FINA World Swimming Championships (25 m), in Hangzhou, China.
