= Ivo Staub =

Swiss swimmer

Personal information
- Nationality: Swiss
- Born: 11 May 1995 (age 31)

Sport
- Sport: Swimming

Ivo Staub (born 11 May 1995) is a Swiss swimmer. He competed in the men's 50 metre freestyle event at the 2018 FINA World Swimming Championships (25 m), in Hangzhou, China.
