= Manuel Leuthard =

Swiss swimmer (born 1998)

Personal information
- Full name: Manuel Adrian Leuthard
- Nationality: Swiss
- Born: 31 October 1998 (age 27) Liestal
- Height: 6.2 ft (189 cm)
- Weight: 185 lb (84 kg)

Sport
- Sport: Swimming
- Strokes: Freestyle, Butterfly
- Club: Paseo Aquatics

Manuel Leuthard (born 31 October 1998) is a Swiss swimmer, he is a multiple time Swiss national champion in the 50-meter freestyle and butterfly and 100-meter freestyle. He competed in the men's 50 meter butterfly event at the 2018 FINA World Swimming Championships (25 m), in Hangzhou, China.
