= Michael Chadwick (swimmer) =

American swimmer (born 1995)

Personal information
- Full name: Michael Hunt Chadwick
- National team: United States
- Born: April 15, 1995 (age 31) Charlotte, North Carolina, U.S.
- Height: 6 ft 6 in (198 cm)
- Weight: 194 lb (88 kg)

Sport
- Sport: Swimming
- Strokes: Freestyle
- Club: Team Elite Aquatics; Toronto Titans (ISL 2020)
- College team: University of Missouri
- Coach: David Marsh
Medal record
Men's swimming
Representing the United States
World Championships (LC)
Gold medal – first place	2017 Budapest	4×100 m freestyle
Gold medal – first place	2019 Gwangju	4×100 m freestyle
World Championships (SC)
Gold medal – first place	2016 Windsor	4×50 m medley mixed
Gold medal – first place	2018 Hangzhou	4×50 m freestyle
Gold medal – first place	2018 Hangzhou	4×100 m freestyle
Gold medal – first place	2018 Hangzhou	4×50 m mixed freestyle
Gold medal – first place	2018 Hangzhou	4×50 m mixed medley
Silver medal – second place	2016 Windsor	4x50 m freestyle
Silver medal – second place	2016 Windsor	4×50 m medley
Silver medal – second place	2018 Hangzhou	4×50 m medley
Bronze medal – third place	2016 Windsor	4×100 m freestyle
Pan American Games
Gold medal – first place	2019 Lima	4×100 m medley
Gold medal – first place	2019 Lima	4×100 m mixed freestyle
Silver medal – second place	2019 Lima	4×100 m freestyle
Bronze medal – third place	2019 Lima	50 m freestyle
Bronze medal – third place	2019 Lima	100 m freestyle
Representing the Missouri Tigers
NCAA Championships
Silver medal – second place	2017 Indianapolis	100 y freestyle
Bronze medal – third place	2017 Indianapolis	4×100 y medley

Michael Hunt Chadwick (born April 15, 1995) is an American swimmer who swims for Team Elite Aquatics in San Diego, CA and formerly for the University of Missouri. He is an NCAA All-American and U.S. National Team member.

== Early life ==
Michael Chadwick grew up in Charlotte, North Carolina with his parents David and Marilynn along with his two older siblings, Bethany and David Chadwick. Chadwick attended Charlotte Latin School and trained at the Mecklenburg Aquatic Club.

Chadwick starting swimming at a late age. His father, David Chadwick, played college basketball at the University of North Carolina and his brother, David, played NCAA Division I basketball as well. Undoubtedly, Michael wanted to follow in his father's footsteps. Chadwick played basketball until he was cut from his 7th grade basketball team. The disappointment led him to pursue swimming instead of basketball.

== Career ==
=== College career ===
Chadwick attended the University of Missouri from 2013 to 2017 and swam all four years. At NCAAs his senior year, he finished second in the 100 free with a time of 40.95 and fourth in the 50 free with a time of 18.97. Chadwick finished the most decorated swimmer in the history of the Missouri swimming program with 22 All-American honors.

=== International Swimming Team ===
In fall of 2019, Chadwick signed for the LA Current, in the ISL's inaugural season. In spring 2020, he signed for the Toronto Titans, the first Canadian based team in the ISL.

=== World Championships ===
Chadwick made his international debut at the 2016 FINA World Swimming Championships (25 m), helping multiple U.S. relays win medals. He teamed up with Tom Shields, Lilly King and Kelsi Worrell to win gold in the 4x50-meter mixed medley relay.

Chadwick qualified for the 2017 U.S. World Championships team as a member of the 400-meter freestyle relay. He placed fifth at U.S. Nationals.

On December 11, 2018, Chadwick swam as part of the 4x100 Freestyle relay team for the US in the 14th FINA World Championships. The relay team set a new world record at 3:03.03, demolishing the previous record of 3:03.3 set by USA in 2009.

== Personal ==
In March 2017, Chadwick announced his engagement to Cassi Diya following the 2017 NCAA Championships. On December 31, New Year's Eve, 2017 Chadwick and Cassi Diya got married. In October 2020, the Chadwicks announced they were pregnant with a baby boy.

== See also ==
- University of Missouri
