= Hou Yujie =

Chinese swimmer (born 1998)

Personal information
- Nationality: Chinese
- Born: 13 April 1998 (age 28)

Sport
- Sport: Swimming
- Strokes: Freestyle
Medal record
Representing China
Asian Games
Silver medal – second place	2018 Jakarta	4x100m freestyle relay
Silver medal – second place	2018 Jakarta	4x200m freestyle relay

Hou Yujie (Chinese: 候钰杰; born 13 April 1998) is a Chinese swimmer. He competed in the men's 100 metre freestyle event at the 2018 FINA World Swimming Championships (25 m), in Hangzhou, China. In the same year, he won the silver medal in both the men's 4 × 100 metre freestyle relay and men's 4 × 200 metre freestyle relay events at the 2018 Asian Games held in Jakarta, Indonesia.
