= Hryhory Pekarski =

Belarusian swimmer

Personal information
- Nationality: Belarusian
- Born: 8 January 1998 (age 28)
- Height: 1.98 m (6 ft 6 in)

Sport
- Sport: Swimming

Hryhory Pekarski (born 8 January 1998) is a Belarusian swimmer. He competed in the men's 50 metre butterfly event at the 2018 FINA World Swimming Championships (25 m), in Hangzhou, China.
