= Kosuke Matsui =

Japanese swimmer (born 1994)

Personal information
- Nationality: Japanese
- Born: 28 March 1994 (age 32)

Sport
- Sport: Swimming
- Strokes: Freestyle
Medal record
Men's swimming
Representing Japan
World Championships (SC)
Bronze medal – third place	2016 Windsor	4×50 m freestyle
Universiade
Silver medal – second place	2019 Naples	50 m freestyle

Kosuke Matsui (Japanese: 松井 浩亮; born 28 March 1994) is a Japanese swimmer. He competed in the men's 50 metre freestyle event at the 2018 FINA World Swimming Championships (25 m), in Hangzhou, China.
