= Santo Condorelli =

American swimmer (born 1995)

Personal information
- Full name: Santo Yukio Condorelli
- National team: Canada (2015–2018); Italy (2018–2025); United States (2025–present)
- Born: January 17, 1995 (age 31) Kitahiroshima, Hokkaido, Japan
- Height: 1.88 m (6 ft 2 in)
- Weight: 88 kg (194 lb)

Sport
- Sport: Swimming
- Strokes: Freestyle; butterfly
- Club: Bolles School; Aurelia Nuoto
- College team: University of Southern California
Medal record
Men's swimming
Representing Canada
World Championships (LC)
Bronze medal – third place	2015 Kazan	4×100 m mixed freestyle
Pan American Games
Silver medal – second place	2015 Toronto	100 m freestyle
Silver medal – second place	2015 Toronto	4×100 m freestyle
Bronze medal – third place	2015 Toronto	100 m butterfly
Bronze medal – third place	2015 Toronto	4×100 m medley
Representing Italy
Olympic Games
Silver medal – second place	2020 Tokyo	4×100 m freestyle
World Championships (SC)
Bronze medal – third place	2018 Hangzhou	4×50 m freestyle
Representing the USC Trojans
NCAA Championships
Gold medal – first place	2015 Iowa City	4×100 y freestyle

Santo Yukio Condorelli (born January 17, 1995) is an American competitive swimmer who previously competed for Canada and Italy. He competed at the 2020 Summer Olympics, in Men's 4 × 100 metre freestyle relay, winning a silver medal.

== Personal life ==
Santo Condorelli was born in Kitahiroshima, Hokkaido, Japan, on January 17, 1995, to parents Joseph and Tonya Condorelli. Condorelli was raised in the Portland, Oregon, suburb of Lake Oswego and began swimming when he was 5 years old with the encouragement of his father. He was able to compete for the Canadian team because his mother was born and raised in Kenora, Ontario, and for Italy because of his father's ancestry.

== Swimming ==
Condorelli competed in the 2012 U.S. Olympic Trials, and the 2014 Phillips 66 Summer National Championships while representing the United States. At the 2013 American Junior National Swimming Championships, he set an American National Age Group Record for the 17-18 age group in the 100 m Freestyle. Starting in 2015, he began to represent Canada, and received a bronze medal at the 2015 World Aquatics Championships for the 4 × 100 m Mixed Freestyle Relay alongside Yuri Kisil, Chantal van Landeghem, and Sandrine Mainville, and finished 4th at the 100m freestyle event, missing the podium by 0.07 seconds. He also received two individual and two relay medals at the 2015 Pan American Games.

Condorelli swam collegiately for the University of Southern California from 2013 to 2018, utilizing a redshirt for the 2015 season leading up to the 2016 Summer Olympics.

In 2016, he was named to Canada's Olympic team for the 2016 Summer Olympics. He finished 4th in the 100 m freestyle in a time of 47.88, missing a bronze medal by 0.03 seconds.

In 2024, Condorelli entered in the U.S. Olympic trials, but due to him representing Italy at the 2020 Summer Olympics, he was unable to compete at the trials.

In 2025, Condorelli placed 2nd in the 50 freestyle at the 2025 National Championships, earning his spot on the World Championship team. This will be the third nation he has represented at the world stage.

=== Rituals ===
Prior to his swims, Condorelli gives the finger to his father, who returns the gesture back to him, as a way to boost confidence and relieve stress.
