= Artsiom Machekin =

Belarusian swimmer (born 1991)

Personal information
- Nationality: Belarusian
- Born: 20 January 1991 (age 35) Daugavpils, Latvia
- Height: 1.86 m (6 ft 1 in)
- Weight: 83 kg (183 lb)

Sport
- Sport: Swimming
Medal record
Men's swimming
Representing Belarus
European Championships (SC)
Bronze medal – third place	2019 Glasgow	4×50 m medley

Artsiom Alyaksandravich Machekin (Belarusian: Арцём Аляксандравіч Мачэкін; born 20 January 1991) is a Belarusian swimmer. He competed in the men's 50 metre freestyle event at the 2018 FINA World Swimming Championships (25 m), in Hangzhou, China. In 2019, he competed in three events at the 2019 World Aquatics Championships held in Gwangju, South Korea.
