= 2018 FINA World Swimming Championships (25 m) =

14th FINA World Swimming Championships (25 m)
- Host city: Hangzhou, China
- Date: 11–16 December 2018
- Venue: Hangzhou Olympic Sports Park Aquatics Center
- Events: 46

The 14th FINA World Swimming Championships (25 m) were held from 11 to 16 December 2018 in Hangzhou, China. These championships featured swimming events in a 25-meter (short-course) pool.

== Medal table ==
* Host nation (China)

Rank	Nation	Gold	Silver	Bronze	Total
1	United States (USA)	17	15	5	37
2	Russia (RUS)	6	5	3	14
3	Hungary (HUN)	4	1	0	5
4	Netherlands (NED)	3	6	2	11
5	China (CHN)*	3	5	5	13
6	South Africa (RSA)	3	2	2	7
7	Australia (AUS)	2	2	8	12
8	Japan (JPN)	2	1	4	7
9	Brazil (BRA)	2	0	6	8
10	Jamaica (JAM)	2	0	1	3
11	Lithuania (LTU)	1	2	0	3
12	Ukraine (UKR)	1	0	0	1
13	Italy (ITA)	0	3	4	7
14	Belarus (BLR)	0	2	0	2
15	Norway (NOR)	0	1	1	2
16	Austria (AUT)	0	1	0	1
17	Belgium (BEL)	0	0	1	1
17	France (FRA)	0	0	1	1
17	Germany (GER)	0	0	1	1
17	Great Britain (GBR)	0	0	1	1
17	Ireland (IRL)	0	0	1	1
17	Poland (POL)	0	0	1	1
17	Trinidad and Tobago (TTO)	0	0	1	1
Totals (23 entries)		46	46	48	140

== Results ==
=== Men's events ===
Event	Gold		Silver		Bronze	
50 m freestyle	Vladimir Morozov; Russia	20.33	Caeleb Dressel; United States	20.54	Brad Tandy; South Africa	20.94
100 m freestyle	Caeleb Dressel; United States	45.62; NR	Vladimir Morozov; Russia	45.64	Chad le Clos; South Africa	45.89
200 m freestyle	Blake Pieroni; United States	1:41.49	Danas Rapšys; Lithuania	1:41.78	Alexander Graham; Australia	1:42.28
400 m freestyle	Danas Rapšys; Lithuania	3:34.01; CR, NR	Henrik Christiansen; Norway	3:36.64; NR	Gabriele Detti; Italy	3:37.54
1500 m freestyle	Mykhailo Romanchuk; Ukraine	14:09.14; CR, NR	Gregorio Paltrinieri; Italy	14:09.87	Henrik Christiansen; Norway	14:19.39; NR
50 m backstroke	Evgeny Rylov; Russia	22.58; NR	Ryan Murphy; United States	22.63	Shane Ryan; Ireland	22.76; NR
100 m backstroke	Ryan Murphy; United States	49.23	Xu Jiayu; China	49.26	Kliment Kolesnikov; Russia	49.40
200 m backstroke	Evgeny Rylov; Russia	1:47.02	Ryan Murphy; United States	1:47.34	Radosław Kawęcki; Poland Mitch Larkin; Australia	1:48.25
50 m breaststroke	Cameron van der Burgh; South Africa	25.41; CR	Ilya Shymanovich; Belarus	25.77; NR	Felipe Lima; Brazil	25.80
100 m breaststroke	Cameron van der Burgh; South Africa	56.01; CR	Ilya Shymanovich; Belarus	56.10; NR	Yasuhiro Koseki; Japan	56.13; AS
200 m breaststroke	Kirill Prigoda; Russia	2:00.16; WR	Qin Haiyang; China	2:01.15; AS	Marco Koch; Germany	2:01.42
50 m butterfly	Nicholas Santos; Brazil	21.81; CR	Chad le Clos; South Africa	21.97	Dylan Carter; Trinidad and Tobago	22.38; NR
100 m butterfly	Chad le Clos; South Africa	48.50	Caeleb Dressel; United States	48.71	Li Zhuhao; China	49.25; AS
200 m butterfly	Daiya Seto; Japan	1:48.24; WR	Chad le Clos; South Africa	1:48.32; AF	Li Zhuhao; China	1:50.39; NR
100 m individual medley	Kliment Kolesnikov; Russia	50.63; CR, WJ	Marco Orsi; Italy	51.03	Michael Andrew; United States	51.58
200 m individual medley	Wang Shun; China	1:51.01	Josh Prenot; United States	1:52.69	Hiromasa Fujimori; Japan	1:52.73
400 m individual medley	Daiya Seto; Japan	3:56.43	Thomas Fraser-Holmes; Australia	4:02.74	Brandonn Almeida; Brazil	4:03.71
4 × 50 m freestyle relay	United States; Caeleb Dressel (20.43) AM; Ryan Held (20.25); Jack Conger (20.59); Michael Chadwick (20.53); Michael Andrew^{[a]} Michael Jensen^{[a]} Kyle DeCoursey^{[a]}	1:21.80; WR	Russia; Vladimir Morozov (20.39); Evgeny Sedov (20.82); Ivan Kuzmenko (20.64); Evgeny Rylov (20.37); Kliment Kolesnikov^{[a]} Sergey Fesikov^{[a]}	1:22.22; NR	Italy; Santo Condorelli (21.27); Andrea Vergani (20.44); Lorenzo Zazzeri (20.57); Alessandro Miressi (20.62)	1:22.90; NR
4 × 100 m freestyle relay	United States; Caeleb Dressel (45.66); Blake Pieroni (45.75); Michael Chadwick (45.86); Ryan Held (45.76); Kyle DeCoursey^{[a]} Michael Jensen^{[a]} Matt Grevers^{[a]}	3:03.03; WR	Russia; Vladislav Grinev (46.38); Sergey Fesikov (46.21); Vladimir Morozov (45.06); Kliment Kolesnikov (45.46); Evgeny Rylov^{[a]} Ivan Kuzmenko^{[a]} Mikhail Vekovishchev^{[a]} Ivan Girev^{[a]}	3:03.11; ER	Brazil; Matheus Santana (46.83); Marcelo Chierighini (46.37); César Cielo (46.34); Breno Correia (45.61)	3:05.15; SA
4 × 200 m freestyle relay	Brazil; Luiz Altamir Melo (1:42.03); Fernando Scheffer (1:40.99); Leonardo Coelho Santos (1:42.81); Breno Correia (1:40.98); Leonardo de Deus^{[a]}	6:46.81; WR	Russia; Martin Malyutin (1:42.34); Mikhail Vekovishchev (1:41.57); Ivan Girev (1:41.85); Aleksandr Krasnykh (1:41.08); Mikhail Dovgalyuk^{[a]} Vladislav Grinev^{[a]}	6:46.84; ER	China; Ji Xinjie (1:42.67); Xu Jiayu (1:41.68); Sun Yang (1:41.25); Wang Shun (1:41.93); Shang Keyuan^{[a]} Qian Zhiyong^{[a]}	6:47.53; AS
4 × 50 m medley relay	Russia; Kliment Kolesnikov (22.87); Oleg Kostin (25.36); Mikhail Vekovishchev (22.09); Evgeny Rylov (20.22); Kirill Prigoda^{[a]} Roman Shevliakov^{[a]} Ivan Kuzmenko^{[a]}	1:30.54	United States; Ryan Murphy (22.73); Michael Andrew (26.16); Caeleb Dressel (21.70); Ryan Held (20.31); Matt Grevers^{[a]} Andrew Wilson^{[a]} Jack Conger^{[a]} Michael Chadwick^{[a]}	1:30.90	Brazil; Guilherme Guido (22.97); Felipe Lima (25.48); Nicholas Santos (22.02); César Cielo (21.02); Matheus Santana^{[a]}	1:31.49
4 × 100 m medley relay	United States; Ryan Murphy (49.63); Andrew Wilson (56.84); Caeleb Dressel (48.28); Ryan Held (45.23); Matt Grevers^{[a]} Michael Andrew^{[a]} Jack Conger^{[a]} Blake Pieroni^{[a]}	3:19.98; CR, AM	Russia; Kliment Kolesnikov (49.62); Kirill Prigoda (55.98); Mikhail Vekovishchev (50.00); Vladimir Morozov (45.01); Andrey Shabasov^{[a]} Oleg Kostin^{[a]} Aleksandr Kharlanov^{[a]} Vladislav Grinev^{[a]}	3:20.61	Japan; Ryosuke Irie (49.95); Yasuhiro Koseki (55.91); Takeshi Kawamoto (49.58); Katsumi Nakamura (45.63); Yuma Edo^{[a]}	3:21.07; AS

^{a} Swimmers who participated in the heats only and received medals.

=== Women's events ===
Event	Gold		Silver		Bronze	
50 m freestyle	Ranomi Kromowidjojo; Netherlands	23.19; CR	Femke Heemskerk; Netherlands	23.67	Etiene Medeiros; Brazil	23.76; AM
100 m freestyle	Ranomi Kromowidjojo; Netherlands	51.14; CR	Femke Heemskerk; Netherlands	51.60	Mallory Comerford; United States	51.63; AM
200 m freestyle	Ariarne Titmus; Australia	1:51.38; OC	Mallory Comerford; United States	1:51.81; NR	Femke Heemskerk; Netherlands	1:52.36
400 m freestyle	Ariarne Titmus; Australia	3:53.92; WR	Wang Jianjiahe; China	3:54.56	Li Bingjie; China	3:57.99
800 m freestyle	Wang Jianjiahe; China	8:04.35	Simona Quadarella; Italy	8:08.03	Leah Smith; United States	8:08.75
50 m backstroke	Olivia Smoliga; United States	25.88; NR	Caroline Pilhatsch; Austria	25.99; NR	Holly Barratt; Australia	26.04
100 m backstroke	Olivia Smoliga; United States	56.19	Katinka Hosszú; Hungary	56.26	Georgia Davies; Great Britain Minna Atherton; Australia	56.74
200 m backstroke	Lisa Bratton; United States	2:00.71	Kathleen Baker; United States	2:00.79	Emily Seebohm; Australia	2:01.37
50 m breaststroke	Alia Atkinson; Jamaica	29.05	Rūta Meilutytė; Lithuania	29.38	Martina Carraro; Italy	29.59; NR
100 m breaststroke	Alia Atkinson; Jamaica	1:03.51	Katie Meili; United States	1:03.63	Jessica Hansen; Australia	1:04.61
200 m breaststroke	Annie Lazor; United States	2:18.32	Bethany Galat; United States	2:18.62	Fanny Lecluyse; Belgium	2:18.85
50 m butterfly	Ranomi Kromowidjojo; Netherlands	24.47; CR, NR	Holly Barratt; Australia	24.80	Kelsi Dahlia; United States	24.97
100 m butterfly	Kelsi Dahlia; United States	55.01	Kendyl Stewart; United States	56.22	Daiene Dias; Brazil	56.31; SA
200 m butterfly	Katinka Hosszú; Hungary	2:01.60	Kelsi Dahlia; United States	2:01.73; AM	Suzuka Hasegawa; Japan	2:04.04
100 m individual medley	Katinka Hosszú; Hungary	57.26	Runa Imai; Japan	57.85	Alia Atkinson; Jamaica	58.11
200 m individual medley	Katinka Hosszú; Hungary	2:03.25	Melanie Margalis; United States	2:04.62	Kathleen Baker; United States	2:05.54
400 m individual medley	Katinka Hosszú; Hungary	4:21.40	Melanie Margalis; United States	4:25.84	Fantine Lesaffre; France	4:27.31 =NR
4 × 50 m freestyle relay	United States; Madison Kennedy (24.05); Mallory Comerford (23.28); Kelsi Dahlia (23.37); Erika Brown (23.33); Lia Neal^{[b]} Olivia Smoliga^{[b]} Veronica Burchill^{[b]}	1:34.03; CR, AM	Netherlands; Ranomi Kromowidjojo (23.60); Femke Heemskerk (23.32); Kim Busch (23.84); Valerie van Roon (23.79); Maaike de Waard^{[b]}	1:34.55	Australia; Holly Barratt (24.04); Emily Seebohm (24.10); Minna Atherton (24.02); Carla Buchanan (24.18); Ariarne Titmus^{[b]}	1:36.34
4 × 100 m freestyle relay	United States; Olivia Smoliga (52.71); Lia Neal (52.58); Mallory Comerford (51.09); Kelsi Dahlia (51.40); Veronica Burchill^{[b]} Erika Brown^{[b]}	3:27.78	Netherlands; Kim Busch (53.19); Femke Heemskerk (50.93); Maaike de Waard (53.13); Ranomi Kromowidjojo (50.77); Valerie van Roon^{[b]}	3:28.02	China; Zhu Menghui (52.58); Yang Junxuan (52.28); Liu Xiaohan (53.26); Wang Jingzhuo (52.80)	3:30.92
4 × 200 m freestyle relay	China; Li Bingjie (1:54.56); Yang Junxuan (1:53.06); Zhang Yuhan (1:53.94); Wang Jianjiahe (1:52.52); Ai Yanhan^{[b]} Liu Xiaohan^{[b]}	7:34.08; AS	United States; Leah Smith (1:55.85); Mallory Comerford (1:53.00); Melanie Margalis (1:53.59); Erika Brown (1:52.86); Lia Neal^{[b]} Veronica Burchill^{[b]}	7:35.30; NR	Australia; Ariarne Titmus (1:52.22); Minna Atherton (1:54.73); Carla Buchanan (1:54.82); Abbey Harkin (1:54.63)	7:36.40; OC
4 × 50 m medley relay	United States; Olivia Smoliga (25.97); Katie Meili (29.29); Kelsi Dahlia (24.02); Mallory Comerford (23.10); Kathleen Baker^{[b]} Kendyl Stewart^{[b]} Erika Brown^{[b]}	1:42.38; WR	China; Fu Yuanhui (26.20); Suo Ran (29.63); Wang Yichun (24.84); Wu Yue (23.64)	1:44.31; AS	Netherlands; Maaike de Waard (26.46); Kim Busch (30.73); Ranomi Kromowidjojo (24.21); Femke Heemskerk (23.17)	1:44.57
4 × 100 m medley relay	United States; Olivia Smoliga (55.86); Katie Meili (1:03.52); Kelsi Dahlia (54.89); Mallory Comerford (51.31); Kathleen Baker^{[b]} Melanie Margalis^{[b]} Kendyl Stewart^{[b]} Lia Neal^{[b]}	3:45.58; CR	China; Fu Yuanhui (56.86); Shi Jinglin (1:03.97); Zhang Yufei (56.21); Zhu Menghui (51.76); Wang Yichun^{[b]} Yang Junxuan^{[b]}	3:48.80	Italy; Margherita Panziera (58.39); Martina Carraro (1:04.47); Elena Di Liddo (56.41); Federica Pellegrini (52.11); Ilaria Bianchi^{[b]}	3:51.38; NR

^{b} Swimmers who participated in the heats only and received medals.

=== Mixed events ===
Event	Gold		Silver		Bronze	
4 × 50 m freestyle relay	United States; Caeleb Dressel (20.43); Ryan Held (20.60); Mallory Comerford (23.44); Kelsi Dahlia (23.42); Michael Andrew^{[c]} Michael Chadwick^{[c]} Olivia Smoliga^{[c]} Madison Kennedy^{[c]}	1:27.89; WR	Netherlands; Jesse Puts (21.17); Stan Pijnenburg (21.18); Ranomi Kromowidjojo (23.09); Femke Heemskerk (23.07); Kim Busch^{[c]} Valerie van Roon^{[c]}	1:28.51	Russia; Vladimir Morozov (20.75); Evgeny Sedov (20.66); Maria Kameneva (23.66); Rozaliya Nasretdinova (23.66); Evgeny Rylov^{[c]} Ivan Kuzmenko^{[c]} Arina Surkova^{[c]}	1:28.73
4 × 50 m medley relay	United States; Olivia Smoliga (25.85); Michael Andrew (25.75); Kelsi Dahlia (24.71); Caeleb Dressel (20.09); Ryan Murphy^{[c]} Katie Meili^{[c]} Kendyl Stewart^{[c]} Michael Chadwick^{[c]}	1:36.40; WR	Netherlands; Jesse Puts (23.87); Ties Elzerman (26.01); Ranomi Kromowidjojo (24.27); Femke Heemskerk (22.90); Maaike de Waard^{[c]} Kim Busch^{[c]}	1:37.05; ER	Russia; Kliment Kolesnikov (22.97); Oleg Kostin (25.52); Rozaliya Nasretdinova (25.23); Maria Kameneva (23.61); Evgeny Rylov^{[c]} Arina Surkova^{[c]}	1:37.33; NR

^{c} Swimmers who participated in the heats only and received medals.
