= Swimming at the 2016 European Aquatics Championships – Men's 50 metre freestyle =

Men's 50 metre freestyle at the 2016 European Aquatics Championships
- Dates: 21–22 May
- Competitors: 70 from 34 nations
- Winning time: 21.73

Medalists
gold medal	Florent Manaudou	France
silver medal	Andriy Hovorov	Ukraine
bronze medal	Benjamin Proud	Great Britain

The Men's 50 metre freestyle competition of the 2016 European Aquatics Championships was held on 21 and 22 May 2016.

== Records ==
Prior to the competition, the existing world, European and championship records were as follows.

	Name	Nation	Time	Location	Date
World record	César Cielo	Brazil	20.91	São Paulo	18 December 2009
European record	Frédérick Bousquet	France	20.94	Montpellier	26 April 2009
Championship record	Florent Manaudou	France	21.32	Berlin	24 August 2014

== Results ==
=== Heats ===
The heats were held on 21 May at 09.09.

Rank	Heat	Lane	Name	Nationality	Time	Notes
1	7	4	Benjamin Proud	Great Britain	22.15	Q
2	8	4	Florent Manaudou	France	22.18	Q
3	8	5	Andriy Hovorov	Ukraine	22.23	Q
4	7	5	Kristian Golomeev	Greece	22.25	Q
5	8	3	Luca Dotto	Italy	22.32	Q
6	7	3	Konrad Czerniak	Poland	22.34	Q
7	6	5	Krisztián Takács	Hungary	22.39	Q
8	7	6	Federico Bocchia	Italy	22.41	Q
9	8	2	Simonas Bilis	Lithuania	22.42	Q
9	6	8	Filip Wypych	Poland	22.42	Q
11	6	4	Marco Orsi	Italy	22.45	
12	5	3	Richárd Bohus	Hungary	22.46	Q
13	6	3	Ari-Pekka Liukkonen	Finland	22.49	Q
14	7	1	Péter Holoda	Hungary	22.51	
15	8	6	Andrey Grechin	Russia	22.55	Q
16	7	2	Odyssefs Meladinis	Greece	22.57	Q
17	8	9	Norbert Trandafir	Romania	22.58	Q
18	8	0	Miguel Ortiz-Cañavate	Spain	22.59	Q
19	5	8	Curtis Coulter	Ireland	22.68	
20	6	6	Frédérick Bousquet	France	22.75	
21	7	7	Thomas Fannon	Great Britain	22.79	
22	6	1	Markel Alberdi	Spain	22.80	
23	6	0	Mindaugas Sadauskas	Lithuania	22.82	
24	8	8	Mario Todorović	Croatia	22.85	
24	5	2	Meiron Cheruti	Israel	22.85	
24	3	4	Isak Eliasson	Sweden	22.85	
27	8	7	Jasper Aerents	Belgium	22.87	
28	8	1	Giuseppe Guttuso	Italy	22.88	
29	7	9	Pjotr Degtarjov	Estonia	22.91	
29	6	2	Ziv Kalontarov	Israel	22.91	
31	4	5	Mislav Sever	Croatia	22.94	
32	6	9	Marius Radu	Romania	22.95	
33	3	3	Daniel Macovei	Romania	22.98	
34	5	9	Or Sabatier	Israel	23.00	
35	4	8	Andrej Barna	Serbia	23.02	
35	5	4	Erik van Dooren	Switzerland	23.02	
37	3	1	Anže Tavčar	Slovenia	23.05	
37	5	5	Christoffer Carlsen	Sweden	23.05	
39	5	1	Emre Sakcı	Turkey	23.10	
40	4	6	Kemal Arda Gürdal	Turkey	23.17	
41	4	1	Tomáš Púchly	Slovakia	23.20	
42	4	4	Marcus Schlesinger	Israel	23.23	
42	7	0	Bogdan Plavin	Ukraine	23.23	
44	4	3	Ivan Levaj	Croatia	23.24	
44	2	2	Tadas Duškinas	Lithuania	23.24	
46	5	0	Shane Ryan	Ireland	23.25	
47	3	6	Andriy Khloptsov	Ukraine	23.33	
48	3	5	Julien Henx	Luxembourg	23.37	
49	3	2	Heiko Gigler	Austria	23.40	
49	5	6	Viktar Staselovich	Belarus	23.40	
49	4	2	Christos Katrantzis	Greece	23.40	
52	4	7	Baslakov İskender	Turkey	23.42	
53	2	3	Alin Coste	Romania	23.50	
54	2	7	Adi Mešetović	Bosnia and Herzegovina	23.53	
55	2	4	Doğa Çelik	Turkey	23.55	
56	4	0	Daniel Macovei	Romania	23.60	
57	3	7	Vahan Mkhitaryan	Armenia	23.67	
57	3	0	Alexander Linge	Sweden	23.67	
59	2	6	Kregor Zirk	Estonia	23.69	
60	3	8	Robin Andreasson	Sweden	23.70	
61	2	5	Matthew Zammit	Malta	23.71	
62	3	9	Markus Lie	Norway	23.82	
63	2	1	Andri Aedma	Estonia	23.93	
64	2	0	Omiros Zagkas	Cyprus	24.08	
65	4	9	Pavel Izbisciuc	Moldova	24.16	
66	1	3	Vladimir Mamikonyan	Armenia	24.26	
67	2	8	Markos Kalopsidiotis	Cyprus	24.43	
68	2	9	Marek Botík	Slovakia	24.53	
69	1	4	Lum Zhaveli	Kosovo	24.62	
70	1	5	Gianluca Pasolini	San Marino	25.49	
	6	7	Pieter Timmers	Belgium	DNS	
	5	7	Ben Schwietert	Netherlands	DNS	
	7	8	Glenn Surgeloose	Belgium	DNS	

=== Semifinals ===
The semifinals were held on 21 May at 16:50.

==== Semifinal 1 ====
Rank	Lane	Name	Nationality	Time	Notes
1	4	Florent Manaudou	France	21.64	Q
2	5	Kristian Golomeev	Greece	21.89	Q
3	7	Ari-Pekka Liukkonen	Finland	21.92	Q
4	3	Konrad Czerniak	Poland	22.29	
5	6	Federico Bocchia	Italy	22.31	
6	1	Odyssefs Meladinis	Greece	22.37	
7	2	Filip Wypych	Poland	22.39	
8	8	Miguel Ortiz-Cañavate	Spain	22.46	

==== Semifinal 2 ====
Rank	Lane	Name	Nationality	Time	Notes
1	4	Benjamin Proud	Great Britain	21.84	Q
2	5	Andriy Hovorov	Ukraine	21.92	Q
3	6	Krisztián Takács	Hungary	22.09	Q
4	8	Norbert Trandafir	Romania	22.12	Q
5	3	Luca Dotto	Italy	22.17	Q
6	2	Simonas Bilis	Lithuania	22.22	
7	1	Andrey Grechin	Russia	22.44	
8	7	Richárd Bohus	Hungary	22.47	

=== Final ===
The final was held on 22 May at 16:07.

Rank	Lane	Name	Nationality	Time	Notes
1st place, gold medalist(s)	4	Florent Manaudou	France	21.73	
2nd place, silver medalist(s)	6	Andriy Hovorov	Ukraine	21.79	
3rd place, bronze medalist(s)	5	Benjamin Proud	Great Britain	21.85	
4	3	Kristian Golomeev	Greece	21.89	
5	2	Ari-Pekka Liukkonen	Finland	22.01	
6	7	Krisztián Takács	Hungary	22.07	
6	8	Luca Dotto	Italy	22.07	
8	1	Norbert Trandafir	Romania	22.51	
