= Poland at the 2019 World Aquatics Championships =

- Flag of Poland
- FINA code: POL
- National federation: Polish Swimming Association
- Website: polswim.pl (in Polish)

World Aquatics Championships appearances
- 1973; 1975; 1978; 1982; 1986; 1991; 1994; 1998; 2001; 2003; 2005; 2007; 2009; 2011; 2013; 2015; 2017; 2019; 2022; 2023; 2024

Poland competed at the 2019 World Aquatics Championships in Gwangju, South Korea from 12 to 28 July.

== Artistic swimming ==
Poland entered 9 artistic swimmers.

Women

Athlete	Event	Preliminaries		Final	
Athlete	Event	Points	Rank	Points	Rank
Wiktoria Grabowska	Solo technical routine	69.2711	25	did not advance	
Aleksandra Filipiuk	Solo free routine	73.6333	28	did not advance	
Gabriela Damentka; Aleksandra Filipiuk	Duet technical routine	71.2235	39	did not advance	
Gabriela Damentka; Aleksandra Filipiuk	Duet free routine	72.1333	38	did not advance	
Adrianna Aleksak; Gabriela Damentka; Aleksandra Filipiuk; Wiktoria Fraszczak; Wiktoria Grabowska; Hanna Hurkot; Julia Mikolajczak; Oliwia Smektala; Kamila Sahli Ousini (R)	Team technical routine	72.7496	21	did not advance	
Adrianna Aleksak; Gabriela Damentka; Aleksandra Filipiuk; Wiktoria Fraszczak; Wiktoria Grabowska; Hanna Hurkot; Julia Mikolajczak; Oliwia Smektala; Kamila Sahli Ousini (R)	Team free routine	73.7000	23	did not advance	

Legend: (R) = Reserve Athlete

== Diving ==
Poland entered three divers.

Men

Athlete	Event	Preliminaries		Semifinals		Final	
Athlete	Event	Points	Rank	Points	Rank	Points	Rank
Kacper Lesiak	1 m springboard	358.70	7 Q	—		380.05	8
Kacper Lesiak	3 m springboard	389.90	21	did not advance			
Andrzej Rzeszutek	1 m springboard	296.25	30	—		did not advance	
Andrzej Rzeszutek	3 m springboard	344.20	38	did not advance			
Kacper Lesiak; Andrzej Rzeszutek	Synchronized 3 m springboard	350.28	10	—		360.69	11

Women

Athlete	Event	Preliminaries		Semifinals		Final	
Athlete	Event	Points	Rank	Points	Rank	Points	Rank
Kaja Skrzek	1 m springboard	210.25	25	—		did not advance	
Kaja Skrzek	3 m springboard	226.80	37	did not advance			

== High diving ==
Poland qualified one male high diver.

Athlete	Event	Points	Rank
Kris Kolanus	Men's high diving	225.20	18

== Open water swimming ==
Poland qualified one male and one female open water swimmers.

Men

Athlete	Event	Time	Rank
Krzysztof Pielowski	Men's 5 km	53:36.9	11
Krzysztof Pielowski	Men's 10 km	1:50:02.8	26

Women

Athlete	Event	Time	Rank
Justyna Burska	Women's 5 km	1:01:33.7	34
Justyna Burska	Women's 10 km	2:03:28.4	47

== Swimming ==
Poland entered 22 swimmers.

Men

Athlete	Event	Heat		Semifinal		Final	
Athlete	Event	Time	Rank	Time	Rank	Time	Rank
Konrad Czerniak	50 m butterfly	23.63	16 Q	23.36	12	did not advance	
Konrad Czerniak	100 m butterfly	52.77	20	did not advance			
Paweł Juraszek	50 m freestyle	21.97	9 Q	21.69	6 Q	21.67	7
Jan Kalusowski	50 m breaststroke	28.26	39	did not advance			
Jan Kalusowski	100 m breaststroke	1:01.49	34	did not advance			
Radosław Kawęcki	100 m backstroke	54.76	27	did not advance			
Radosław Kawęcki	200 m backstroke	1:56.99	4 Q	1:57.24	7 Q	1:56.37	4
Kacper Majchrzak	100 m freestyle	48.87	=19	did not advance			
Kacper Majchrzak	200 m freestyle	1:48.05	23	did not advance			
Tomasz Polewka	50 m backstroke	25.31	19	did not advance			
Jakub Skierka	200 m backstroke	1:57.61	8 Q	DSQ		did not advance	
Jan Świtkowski	200 m butterfly	1:57.58	21	did not advance			
Dawid Szwedzki	200 m breaststroke	2:15.91	41	did not advance			
Dawid Szwedzki	200 m individual medley	2:02.14	28	did not advance			
Dawid Szwedzki	400 m individual medley	4:17.48	16	—		did not advance	
Wojciech Wojdak	400 m freestyle	3:48.81	14	—		did not advance	
Wojciech Wojdak	800 m freestyle	7:50.64	13	—		did not advance	
Wojciech Wojdak	1500 m freestyle	15:16.14	23	—		did not advance	
Kacper Majchrzak; Przemysław Gawrysiak; Jan Hołub; Jakub Kraska	4×100 m freestyle relay	3:14.78	12	—		did not advance	
Jan Świtkowski; Jan Holub; Jakub Kraska; Kacper Majchrzak	4×200 m freestyle relay	7:12.01	11	—		did not advance	
Radosław Kawęcki; Jan Kałusowski; Konrad Czerniak; Kacper Majchrzak	4×100 m medley relay	3:38.09	21	—		did not advance	

Women

Athlete	Event	Heat		Semifinal		Final	
Athlete	Event	Time	Rank	Time	Rank	Time	Rank
Weronika Hallmann	50 m breaststroke	32.07	29	did not advance			
Weronika Hallmann	100 m breaststroke	1:09.72	30	did not advance			
Weronika Hallmann	200 m breaststroke	2:30.22	24	did not advance			
Zuzanna Herasimowicz	200 m backstroke	2:11.57	21	did not advance			
Aleksandra Knop	200 m individual medley	2:20.18	29	did not advance			
Aleksandra Knop	400 m individual medley	5:00.77	25	—		did not advance	
Paulina Nogaj	50 m butterfly	27.08	32	did not advance			
Paulina Nogaj	100 m butterfly	59.82	27	did not advance			
Aleksandra Polańska	200 m freestyle	2:00.34	21	did not advance			
Alicja Tchórz	50 m backstroke	28.14	10 Q	28.18	15	did not advance	
Alicja Tchórz	100 m backstroke	21	1:01.08	did not advance			
Katarzyna Wilk	50 m freestyle	24.97	14 Q	25.03	16	did not advance	
Katarzyna Wilk	100 m freestyle	54.68	22	did not advance			
Katarzyna Wilk; Alicja Tchórz; Dominika Kossakowska; Aleksandra Polańska	4×100 m freestyle relay	3:41.01	12	—		did not advance	
Aleksandra Polańska; Dominika Kossakowska; Marta Klimek; Aleksandra Knop	4×200 m freestyle relay	8:01.70	9	—		did not advance	
Alicja Tchórz; Weronika Hallmann; Paulina Nogaj; Katarzyna Wasick	4×100 m medley relay	4:04.27	15	—		did not advance	

Mixed

Athlete	Event	Heat		Final	
Athlete	Event	Time	Rank	Time	Rank
Jakub Kraska; Jan Hołub; Katarzyna Wilk; Aleksandra Polańska	4×100 m freestyle relay	3:27.63	10	did not advance	
Alicja Tchórz; Jan Kałusowski; Konrad Czerniak; Katarzyna Wilk	4×100 m medley relay	3:48.21	11	did not advance	
