= Swimming at the 2018 European Aquatics Championships – Men's 50 metre butterfly =

Men's 50 metre butterfly at the 2018 European Aquatics Championships
- Venue: Tollcross International Swimming Centre
- Dates: 6 August (heats and semifinals); 7 August (final)
- Competitors: 64 from 29 nations
- Winning time: 22.48

Medalists
gold medal	Andriy Govorov	Ukraine
silver medal	Ben Proud	Great Britain
bronze medal	Oleg Kostin	Russia

The Men's 50 metre butterfly competition of the 2018 European Aquatics Championships was held on 6 and 7 August 2018.

== Records ==
Prior to the competition, the existing world and championship records were as follows.

	Name	Nation	Time	Location	Date
World record European record	Andriy Govorov	Ukraine	22.27	Rome	1 July 2018
Championship record	Andriy Govorov	Ukraine	22.73	London	16 May 2016

The following new records were set during this competition.

Date	Event	Name	Nationality	Time	Record
7 August	Final	Andriy Govorov	Ukraine	22.48	CR

== Results ==
=== Heats ===
The heats were started on 6 August at 10:09.

Rank	Heat	Lane	Name	Nationality	Time	Notes
1	7	4	Andriy Govorov	Ukraine	22.90	Q
2	6	4	Ben Proud	Great Britain	23.29	Q
3	5	6	Nyls Korstanje	Netherlands	23.40	Q
4	6	6	Kristian Golomeev	Greece	23.42	Q
5	5	5	Konrad Czerniak	Poland	23.45	Q
5	5	4	Oleg Kostin	Russia	23.45	Q
7	7	3	László Cseh	Hungary	23.53	Q
8	7	5	Damian Wierling	Germany	23.56	Q
9	4	4	Daniel Zaitsev	Estonia	23.58	Q
10	7	6	Mathys Goosen	Netherlands	23.60	Q
10	6	5	Yauhen Tsurkin	Belarus	23.60	Q
12	6	7	Andrea Vergani	Italy	23.61	Q
13	3	7	Bruno Blašković	Croatia	23.68	Q
14	6	3	Piero Codia	Italy	23.71	Q
15	6	2	Mehdy Metella	France	23.72	Q, WD
16	5	8	Meiron Cheruti	Israel	23.75	Q
17	5	3	Nikita Korolev	Russia	23.81	QSO
17	6	1	Jesse Puts	Netherlands	23.81	
17	4	5	Sergii Shevtsov	Ukraine	23.81	QSO
20	2	3	Liubomyr Lemeshko	Ukraine	23.82	
21	6	8	Marcus Schlesinger	Israel	23.89	
22	4	7	Jacob Peters	Great Britain	23.95	
22	7	2	Aleksandr Sadovnikov	Russia	23.95	
24	5	1	Ümitcan Güreş	Turkey	23.98	
25	4	6	Julien Henx	Luxembourg	23.99	
26	5	9	Niko Mäkelä	Finland	24.02	
26	7	9	Deividas Margevičius	Lithuania	24.02	
28	5	2	Riku Poeytaekivi	Finland	24.03	
29	4	2	Paweł Sendyk	Poland	24.07	
30	3	8	Nikola Miljenić	Croatia	24.13	
31	4	1	Noè Ponti	Switzerland	24.22	
31	3	1	Niksa Stojkovski	Norway	24.22	
33	5	7	Yahor Dodaleu	Belarus	24.23	
33	4	3	Anton Herrala	Finland	24.23	
35	5	0	Hryhory Pekarski	Belarus	24.24	
36	3	6	Viktar Staselovich	Belarus	24.28	
37	7	8	Kristóf Milák	Hungary	24.29	
38	3	5	Pierre Henry	France	24.33	
39	4	9	Matteo Rivolta	Italy	24.34	
39	7	0	Jan Šefl	Czech Republic	24.34	
41	7	1	Michał Chudy	Poland	24.36	
41	3	3	Yonel Govindin	France	24.36	
43	2	5	Kaan Ayar	Turkey	24.37	
44	2	0	Ralf Tribuntsov	Estonia	24.39	
45	4	8	Ari-Pekka Liukkonen	Finland	24.42	
46	3	4	Berk Özkul	Turkey	24.43	
47	2	7	Ádám Halaš	Slovakia	24.52	
48	3	2	Petr Novák	Czech Republic	24.54	
49	6	0	Simon Bucher	Austria	24.59	
50	2	6	İlker Altınbilek	Turkey	24.69	
51	3	9	George-Adrian Raţiu	Romania	24.72	
52	4	0	Egor Kuimov	Russia	24.77	
53	2	8	Cevin Siim	Estonia	24.82	
54	1	6	Artur Barseghyan	Armenia	24.86	
55	2	1	Mislav Sever	Croatia	24.88	
56	2	9	Teimuraz Kobakhidze	Georgia	24.89	
57	1	4	Armin Lelle	Estonia	24.92	
58	3	0	Calum Bain	Ireland	24.93	
59	6	9	Antani Ivanov	Bulgaria	24.99	
60	1	5	Paul Espernberger	Austria	25.26	
61	1	7	Georgia Biganishvili	Georgia	25.28	
62	1	3	Xaver Gschwentner	Austria	25.42	
63	1	2	Michael Stafrace	Malta	26.29	
64	1	1	Ruben Gharibyan	Armenia	27.63	
	2	2	Viktor Bromer	Denmark	Did not start	
	7	7	Joeri Verlinden	Netherlands	Did not start	

==== Swim-off ====
The swim-off was held on 6 August at 11:34.

Rank	Lane	Name	Nationality	Time	Notes
1	5	Sergii Shevtsov	Ukraine	23.45	Q
2	4	Nikita Korolev	Russia	23.60	

=== Semifinals ===
The semifinals were started on 6 August at 17:41.

==== Semifinal 1 ====
Rank	Lane	Name	Nationality	Time	Notes
1	4	Ben Proud	Great Britain	23.01	Q
2	5	Kristian Golomeev	Greece	23.22	Q
3	6	Damian Wierling	Germany	23.34	Q
4	3	Konrad Czerniak	Poland	23.37	Q
4	7	Andrea Vergani	Italy	23.37	Q
6	8	Sergii Shevtsov	Ukraine	23.58	
7	2	Yauhen Tsurkin	Belarus	23.61	
8	1	Piero Codia	Italy	23.63	

==== Semifinal 2 ====
Rank	Lane	Name	Nationality	Time	Notes
1	4	Andriy Govorov	Ukraine	22.85	Q
2	5	Nyls Korstanje	Netherlands	23.38	Q
3	3	Oleg Kostin	Russia	23.41	Q
4	6	László Cseh	Hungary	23.48	
5	7	Mathys Goosen	Netherlands	23.54	
6	1	Bruno Blašković	Croatia	23.73	
7	8	Meiron Cheruti	Israel	23.77	
8	2	Daniel Zaitsev	Estonia	23.82	

=== Final ===
The final was started on 7 August at 16:50.

Rank	Lane	Name	Nationality	Time	Notes
1st place, gold medalist(s)	4	Andriy Govorov	Ukraine	22.48	CR
2nd place, silver medalist(s)	5	Ben Proud	Great Britain	22.78	
3rd place, bronze medalist(s)	8	Oleg Kostin	Russia	22.97	NR
4	3	Kristian Golomeev	Greece	23.19	
5	7	Andrea Vergani	Italy	23.34	
6	1	Nyls Korstanje	Netherlands	23.38	
7	6	Damian Wierling	Germany	23.46	
8	2	Konrad Czerniak	Poland	23.49	
