= Swimming at the 2014 European Aquatics Championships – Men's 50 metre freestyle =

Men's 50 metre freestyle at the Swimming at the 2014 European Aquatics Championships
- Dates: 23–24 August
- Competitors: 58 from 29 nations
- Winning time: 21.32

Medalists
gold medal	Florent Manaudou	France
silver medal	Konrad Czerniak	Poland
bronze medal	Ari-Pekka Liukkonen	Finland

The Men's 50 metre freestyle competition of the 2014 European Aquatics Championships was held on 23–24 August.

== Records ==
Prior to the competition, the existing world, European and championship records were as follows.

	Name	Nation	Time	Location	Date
World record	César Cielo	Brazil	20.91	São Paulo	18 December 2009
European record	Frédérick Bousquet	France	20.94	Montpellier	26 April 2009
Championship record	Frédérick Bousquet	France	21.36	Budapest	14 August 2010

== Results ==
=== Heats ===
The heats were held at 09:40.

Rank	Heat	Lane	Name	Nationality	Time	Notes
1	6	5	Marco Orsi	Italy	22.18	Q
1	5	6	Oleg Tikhobaev	Russia	22.18	Q
3	7	2	Kristian Golomeev	Greece	22.19	Q
4	7	4	Florent Manaudou	France	22.20	Q
5	6	6	Luca Dotto	Italy	22.21	Q
6	5	4	Ben Proud	Great Britain	22.26	Q
6	7	3	Konrad Czerniak	Poland	22.26	Q
8	5	5	Andrey Grechin	Russia	22.29	Q
9	6	2	Ari-Pekka Liukkonen	Finland	22.33	Q
9	7	8	Dominik Kozma	Hungary	22.33	Q
9	7	6	Sergey Fesikov	Russia	22.33	
12	6	4	Vladimir Morozov	Russia	22.35	
13	5	3	Krisztián Takács	Hungary	22.41	Q
14	7	5	Andriy Hovorov	Ukraine	22.44	Q
15	5	1	Fabien Gilot	France	22.47	Q
16	7	7	François Heersbrandt	Belgium	22.51	Q
17	7	1	Jasper Aerents	Belgium	22.60	Q
18	5	7	Nosy Pelagie	France	22.66	
19	3	8	Marius Radu	Romania	22.68	Q
20	6	0	Mindaugas Sadauskas	Lithuania	22.69	
21	6	3	Norbert Trandafir	Romania	22.75	
22	6	7	Miguel Ortiz-Cañavate Ozeki	Spain	22.83	
23	3	3	Sidni Hoxha	Albania	22.89	
24	5	8	Yahav Shahaff	Israel	22.97	
24	5	9	Baslakov İskender	Turkey	22.97	
26	7	9	Ivan Levaj	Croatia	22.98	
26	2	7	Tadas Duškinas	Lithuania	22.98	
28	6	8	Almog Olshtein	Israel	22.99	
29	4	7	Christoffer Carlsen	Sweden	23.03	
30	3	2	Mario Todorović	Croatia	23.07	
31	4	9	Mislav Sever	Croatia	23.08	
32	4	2	Simonas Bilis	Lithuania	23.09	
33	4	4	Kacper Majchrzak	Poland	23.11	
34	4	5	Boris Stojanović	Serbia	23.12	
35	7	0	Sebastian Szczepański	Poland	23.13	
36	4	3	Pjotr Degtjarov	Estonia	23.15	
36	1	3	Daniel Macovei	Romania	23.15	
36	4	8	Alexander Nyström	Sweden	23.15	
39	6	9	Nikša Stojkovski	Croatia	23.19	
40	3	7	Radovan Siljevski	Serbia	23.20	
41	2	1	Martin Verner	Czech Republic	23.24	
42	3	1	Martin Spitzer	Austria	23.30	
43	4	6	Jesse Puts	Netherlands	23.31	
44	3	0	Gustav Aberg	Sweden	23.36	
45	3	5	Arseni Kukharau	Belarus	23.44	
46	3	9	Viktar Staselovich	Belarus	23.50	
47	3	4	Julien Henx	Luxembourg	23.51	
47	5	2	Doğa Çelik	Turkey	23.51	
49	4	1	Oscar Ekström	Sweden	23.53	
50	4	0	Péter Holoda	Hungary	23.58	
51	2	3	Alin Coste	Romania	23.59	
52	2	5	Ensar Hajder	Bosnia and Herzegovina	23.72	
53	2	2	Arnel Dudić	Bosnia and Herzegovina	23.74	
54	2	6	Michal Navara	Slovakia	23.76	
55	1	5	Dan Sweeney	Ireland	24.07	
56	2	4	Jonatan Kopelev	Israel	24.12	
57	2	8	Davit Sikharulidze	Georgia	24.27	
58	1	4	Fred Karu	Estonia	24.42	
—	3	6	Nimrod Shapira Bar-Or	Israel		DNS
—	5	0	Kemal Arda Gürdal	Turkey		DNS
—	6	1	Clement Mignon	France		DNS

=== Semifinals ===
The semifinals were held at 16:43.

==== Semifinal 1 ====
Rank	Lane	Name	Nationality	Time	Notes
1	5	Florent Manaudou	France	21.57	Q
2	3	Ben Proud	Great Britain	21.94	Q
3	7	Andriy Hovorov	Ukraine	22.02	Q
4	6	Andrey Grechin	Russia	22.06	Q
5	4	Oleg Tikhobaev	Russia	22.17	
6	1	François Heersbrandt	Belgium	22.18	
7	2	Dominik Kozma	Hungary	22.35	
8	8	Marius Radu	Romania	22.44	

==== Semifinal 2 ====
Rank	Lane	Name	Nationality	Time	Notes
1	5	Kristian Golomeev	Greece	21.96	Q
2	6	Konrad Czerniak	Poland	22.06	Q
3	2	Ari-Pekka Liukkonen	Finland	22.10	Q
4	4	Marco Orsi	Italy	22.15	Q
5	7	Krisztián Takács	Hungary	22.25	
6	3	Luca Dotto	Italy	22.27	
7	1	Fabien Gilot	France	22.38	
8	8	Jasper Aerents	Belgium	22.46	

=== Final ===
The final was held at 16:05.

Rank	Lane	Name	Nationality	Time	Notes
1st place, gold medalist(s)	4	Florent Manaudou	France	21.32	CR
2nd place, silver medalist(s)	7	Konrad Czerniak	Poland	21.88	
3rd place, bronze medalist(s)	1	Ari-Pekka Liukkonen	Finland	21.93	
4	5	Ben Proud	Great Britain	21.94	
5	8	Marco Orsi	Italy	22.09	
6	2	Andrey Grechin	Russia	22.10	
7	3	Kristian Golomeev	Greece	22.13	
8	6	Andriy Hovorov	Ukraine	22.14	
