= Swimming at the 2020 European Aquatics Championships – Men's 50 metre freestyle =

2021 swimming competition

Men's 50 metre freestyle at the 2020 European Aquatics Championships
- Venue: Danube Arena
- Dates: 22 May 2021 (heats and semifinals); 23 May 2021 (final)
- Competitors: 69 from 36 nations
- Winning time: 21.61

Medalists
gold medal	Ari-Pekka Liukkonen	Finland
silver medal	Ben Proud	Great Britain
bronze medal	Kristian Golomeev	Greece

The Men's 50 metre freestyle competition of the 2020 European Aquatics Championships was held on 22 and 23 May 2021.

== Records ==
Prior to the competition, the existing world and championship records were as follows.

	Name	Nation	Time	Location	Date
World record	César Cielo	Brazil	20.91	São Paulo	18 December 2009
European record	Frédérick Bousquet	France	20.94	Montpellier	26 April 2009
Championship record	Ben Proud	Great Britain	21.11	Glasgow	8 August 2018

== Results ==
=== Heats ===
The heats were started on 22 May at 10:15.

Rank	Heat	Lane	Name	Nationality	Time	Notes
1	7	5	Thom de Boer	Netherlands	21.76	Q
2	6	4	Florent Manaudou	France	21.86	Q
3	8	4	Ben Proud	Great Britain	21.93	Q
4	8	2	Alessandro Miressi	Italy	21.97	Q
5	7	4	Kristian Golomeev	Greece	21.98	Q
6	6	6	Ari-Pekka Liukkonen	Finland	21.99	Q
7	7	7	Konrad Czerniak	Poland	22.00	Q
8	8	6	Lorenzo Zazzeri	Italy	22.01	Q
9	7	2	Vladyslav Bukhov	Ukraine	22.05	Q
10	8	5	Paweł Juraszek	Poland	22.08	Q
11	6	5	Leonardo Deplano	Italy	22.11	
12	6	2	Kenzo Simons	Netherlands	22.13	Q
13	7	9	Björn Seeliger	Sweden	22.15	Q
14	6	8	Andriy Govorov	Ukraine	22.19	Q
14	8	3	Maxime Grousset	France	22.19	Q
16	7	6	Kliment Kolesnikov	Russia	22.24	Q
17	8	8	Andrej Barna	Serbia	22.27	QSO
17	6	0	Heiko Gigler	Austria	22.27	QSO, NR
19	6	3	Jesse Puts	Netherlands	22.28	
20	7	3	Meiron Cheruti	Israel	22.30	
21	5	6	Daniel Zaitsev	Estonia	22.32	NR
22	8	7	Stan Pijnenburg	Netherlands	22.35	
23	4	6	Nicholas Lia	Norway	22.37	
24	4	0	David Popovici	Romania	22.43	
25	5	1	Péter Holoda	Hungary	22.44	
25	8	1	Nándor Németh	Hungary	22.44	
27	7	1	Miguel Nascimento	Portugal	22.46	
28	5	9	Matej Duša	Slovakia	22.49	NR
29	5	0	Isak Eliasson	Sweden	22.50	
30	3	6	Nikola Aćin	Serbia	22.51	
31	7	8	Sergii Shevtsov	Ukraine	22.64	
32	6	9	Jacob Whittle	Great Britain	22.65	
33	5	7	Illya Linnyk	Ukraine	22.67	
33	5	5	Artsiom Machekin	Belarus	22.67	
35	8	9	Niksa Stojkovski	Norway	22.71	
36	5	3	Anton Herrala	Finland	22.74	
37	5	8	Jokūbas Keblys	Lithuania	22.77	
38	4	3	Jasper Aerents	Belgium	22.80	
38	3	5	Jan Holub	Poland	22.80	
38	5	4	Jakub Kraska	Poland	22.80	
41	8	0	Odyssefs Meladinis	Greece	22.83	
42	7	0	Simonas Bilis	Lithuania	22.84	
43	3	4	Sebastien De Meulemeester	Belgium	22.91	
44	3	3	Elias Persson	Sweden	22.97	
44	4	5	Juan Segura	Spain	22.97	
46	4	1	George Stoica-Constantin	Romania	22.99	
47	4	4	Robin Hanson	Sweden	23.03	
48	3	9	Markus Lie	Norway	23.06	
49	4	2	Mario Mollà	Spain	23.15	
50	4	9	Artur Barseghyan	Armenia	23.22	
51	4	8	Yalım Acımış	Turkey	23.29	
52	3	2	Nikola Bjelajac	Bosnia and Herzegovina	23.31	
53	4	7	Julien Henx	Luxembourg	23.33	
54	3	0	Nikolas Antoniou	Cyprus	23.34	
55	3	1	Dadó Fenrir Jasminuson	Iceland	23.44	
55	2	5	Bernat Lomero	Andorra	23.44	NR
57	3	7	Constantin Malachi	Moldova	23.65	
58	3	8	Doğa Çelik	Turkey	23.72	
59	2	4	David Abesadze	Georgia	23.75	
60	2	6	Tomás Lomero	Andorra	23.98	
61	1	3	Vladimir Mamikonyan	Armenia	24.01	
62	2	3	Boško Radulović	Montenegro	24.51	
63	2	1	Giacomo Casadei	San Marino	24.74	
63	2	7	Ethan Faloppa	Monaco	24.74	
65	2	2	Théo Chiabaut	Monaco	24.93	
66	1	4	Vigan Bytyqi	Kosovo	25.04	
67	2	0	Eduard Tshagharyan	Armenia	25.15	
68	2	8	Olt Kondirolli	Kosovo	25.44	
69	1	5	Dren Ukimeraj	Kosovo	25.85	
	6	7	Vladislav Grinev	Russia	Did not start	
	6	1	Kristof Milak	Hungary	Did not start	
	5	2	Nikola Miljenić	Croatia	Did not start	

==== Swim-off ====
The swim-off was held on 22 May at 11:50.

Rank	Lane	Name	Nationality	Time	Notes
1	4	Heiko Gigler	Austria	22.05	Q, NR
2	5	Andrej Barna	Serbia	22.14	NR

=== Semifinals ===
The semifinals were held on 22 May at 18:34.

==== Semifinal 1 ====
Rank	Lane	Name	Nationality	Time	Notes
1	4	Florent Manaudou	France	21.67	Q
2	3	Ari-Pekka Liukkonen	Finland	21.72	Q
3	5	Alessandro Miressi	Italy	21.86	q
3	6	Lorenzo Zazzeri	Italy	21.86	q
5	1	Maxime Grousset	France	21.95	q
6	2	Paweł Juraszek	Poland	21.97	
7	8	Heiko Gigler	Austria	22.10	
7	7	Björn Seeliger	Sweden	22.10	

==== Semifinal 2 ====
Rank	Lane	Name	Nationality	Time	Notes
1	3	Kristian Golomeev	Greece	21.60	Q
2	4	Thom de Boer	Netherlands	21.80	Q
3	5	Ben Proud	Great Britain	21.84	q
4	2	Vladyslav Bukhov	Ukraine	22.07	
5	7	Kenzo Simons	Netherlands	22.14	
6	6	Konrad Czerniak	Poland	22.21	
7	1	Andriy Govorov	Ukraine	22.24	
8	8	Kliment Kolesnikov	Russia	22.32	

=== Final ===
The final was held on 23 May at 18:05.

Rank	Lane	Name	Nationality	Time	Notes
1st place, gold medalist(s)	3	Ari-Pekka Liukkonen	Finland	21.61	
2nd place, silver medalist(s)	2	Ben Proud	Great Britain	21.69	
3rd place, bronze medalist(s)	4	Kristian Golomeev	Greece	21.73	
4	6	Thom de Boer	Netherlands	21.80	
5	5	Florent Manaudou	France	21.81	
6	1	Lorenzo Zazzeri	Italy	21.92	
7	8	Maxime Grousset	France	22.02	
8	7	Alessandro Miressi	Italy	22.19	
