= Swimming at the 2016 European Aquatics Championships – Men's 50 metre butterfly =

Men's 50 metre butterfly at the 2016 European Aquatics Championships
- Dates: 16–17 May
- Competitors: 62 from 34 nations

Medalists
gold medal	Andriy Hovorov	Ukraine
silver medal	László Cseh	Hungary
bronze medal	Benjamin Proud	Great Britain

The Men's 50 metre butterfly competition of the 2016 European Aquatics Championships was held on 16 and 17 May 2016.

== Records ==
Prior to the competition, the existing world, European and championship records were as follows.

	Name	Nation	Time	Location	Date
World record	Rafael Muñoz	Spain	22.43	Málaga	5 April 2009
European record	Rafael Muñoz	Spain	22.43	Málaga	5 April 2009
Championship record	Andriy Hovorov	Ukraine	22.87	Berlin	18 August 2014

== Results ==
=== Heats ===
The heats were held on 16 May at 11:44.

Rank	Heat	Lane	Name	Nationality	Time	Notes
1	6	4	Andriy Hovorov	Ukraine	23.00	Q
2	5	4	Benjamin Proud	Great Britain	23.54	Q
3	6	5	Piero Codia	Italy	23.67	Q
4	5	2	Mario Todorović	Croatia	23.86	Q
5	7	4	László Cseh	Hungary	23.89	Q
6	6	3	Ivan Lenđer	Serbia	23.93	Q
7	7	3	Andriy Khloptsov	Ukraine	23.95	Q
8	7	5	Yauhen Tsurkin	Belarus	23.97	Q
9	7	6	Joeri Verlinden	Netherlands	24.03	Q
10	6	6	Matteo Rivolta	Italy	24.06	Q
11	4	0	Lyubomyr Lemeshko	Ukraine	24.07	
12	6	7	Kristian Golomeev	Greece	24.09	Q
13	7	0	Jan Šefl	Czech Republic	24.16	Q
14	7	7	Søren Dahl	Denmark	24.17	Q
14	5	5	Frédérick Bousquet	France	24.17	Q
16	5	7	Oskar Krupecki	Poland	24.19	Q
17	7	1	Oleksiy Ivanov	Ukraine	24.21	
18	5	6	Meiron Cheruti	Israel	24.29	Q
19	5	9	Daniel Zaitsev	Estonia	24.32	
19	6	2	Deividas Margevičius	Lithuania	24.32	
21	4	3	Andreas Vazaios	Greece	24.39	
22	5	0	Bence Pulai	Hungary	24.43	
23	3	8	Robert Žbogar	Slovenia	24.49	
24	6	1	Marcus Schlesinger	Israel	24.52	
25	7	9	Christos Katrantzis	Greece	24.54	
26	3	1	Julien Henx	Luxembourg	24.55	
27	4	9	Filip Milcevic	Austria	24.56	
28	7	8	Kregor Zirk	Estonia	24.61	
29	5	3	Tomer Zamir	Israel	24.63	
30	4	4	Alexandru Coci	Romania	24.67	
30	4	2	Nico van Duijn	Switzerland	24.67	
32	3	0	Brendan Hyland	Ireland	24.68	
33	5	1	Paul Lemaire	France	24.69	
34	3	4	Mislav Sever	Croatia	24.71	
34	4	6	Petr Novák	Czech Republic	24.71	
36	4	7	Sascha Subarsky	Austria	24.73	
37	4	1	Jesper Björk	Sweden	24.74	
38	6	8	Thomas Maurer	Switzerland	24.78	
38	6	0	Berk Özkul	Turkey	24.78	
40	3	7	Antani Ivanov	Bulgaria	24.80	
41	6	9	Alexandre Haldemann	Switzerland	24.81	
42	3	5	Tamás Kenderesi	Hungary	24.82	
43	2	7	Giacomo Carini	Italy	24.88	
44	3	6	Stefanos Dimitriadis	Greece	24.95	
45	2	8	Kaan Ayar	Turkey	24.98	
46	1	3	Markus Lie	Norway	25.01	
47	4	5	Tomáš Púchly	Slovakia	25.04	
48	2	6	Alin Coste	Romania	25.06	
49	2	3	Nuno Quintanilha	Portugal	25.07	
50	3	9	Alexander Linge	Sweden	25.16	
51	4	8	Aleksi Schmid	Switzerland	25.27	
52	3	2	Arkadi Kalinovski	Estonia	25.34	
53	2	4	Adi Mešetović	Bosnia and Herzegovina	25.43	
54	2	1	Tomáš Havránek	Czech Republic	25.45	
55	2	0	Pāvels Vilcāns	Latvia	25.52	
56	3	3	Pavel Izbisciuc	Moldova	25.54	
57	2	5	Thomas Fannon	Great Britain	25.55	
58	2	9	Ljupcho Angelovski	Macedonia	25.64	
59	2	2	Ergecan Gezmiş	Turkey	25.77	
60	1	4	Vahan Mkhitaryan	Armenia	26.51	
61	1	5	Lum Zhaveli	Kosovo	27.00	
62	5	8	Ádám Telegdy	Hungary	27.71	
	7	2	Tadas Duškinas	Lithuania	DNS	

=== Semifinals ===
The semifinals were held on 16 May at 19:03.

==== Semifinal 1 ====
Rank	Lane	Name	Nationality	Time	Notes
1	4	Benjamin Proud	Great Britain	23.42	Q
2	1	Frédérick Bousquet	France	23.69	Q
3	8	Meiron Cheruti	Israel	23.70	Q
4	6	Yauhen Tsurkin	Belarus	23.72	Q
5	5	Mario Todorović	Croatia	23.73	
6	3	Ivan Lenđer	Serbia	23.91	
7	2	Matteo Rivolta	Italy	24.00	
8	7	Jan Šefl	Czech Republic	24.04	

==== Semifinal 2 ====
Rank	Lane	Name	Nationality	Time	Notes
1	4	Andriy Hovorov	Ukraine	22.73	Q, CR
2	5	Piero Codia	Italy	23.55	Q
3	3	László Cseh	Hungary	23.57	Q
4	2	Joeri Verlinden	Netherlands	23.67	Q
5	6	Andriy Khloptsov	Ukraine	23.92	
6	1	Søren Dahl	Denmark	24.01	
7	7	Kristian Golomeev	Greece	24.02	
8	8	Oskar Krupecki	Poland	24.13	

=== Final ===
The final was held on 17 May at 18:02.

Rank	Lane	Name	Nationality	Time	Notes
1st place, gold medalist(s)	4	Andriy Hovorov	Ukraine	22.92	
2nd place, silver medalist(s)	6	László Cseh	Hungary	23.31	
3rd place, bronze medalist(s)	5	Benjamin Proud	Great Britain	23.34	
4	3	Piero Codia	Italy	23.46	
5	8	Yauhen Tsurkin	Belarus	23.67	
6	7	Frédérick Bousquet	France	23.71	
7	2	Joeri Verlinden	Netherlands	23.82	
8	1	Meiron Cheruti	Israel	23.93	
