= Swimming at the 2016 European Aquatics Championships – Men's 200 metre butterfly =

Men's 200 metre butterfly at the 2016 European Aquatics Championships
- Dates: 18-19 May
- Competitors: 37 from 25 nations
- Winning time: 1:52.91

Medalists
gold medal	László Cseh	Hungary
silver medal	Viktor Bromer	Denmark
bronze medal	Tamás Kenderesi	Hungary

The Men's 200 metre butterfly competition of the 2016 European Aquatics Championships was held on 18-19 May 2016.

== Records ==
Prior to the competition, the existing world, European and championship records were as follows.

	Name	Nation	Time	Location	Date
World record	Michael Phelps	United States	1:51.51	Rome	29 July 2009
European record	László Cseh	Hungary	1:52.70	Beijing	13 August 2008
Championship record	Paweł Korzeniowski	Poland	1:54.38	Eindhoven	21 March 2008

== Results ==
=== Heats ===
The heats were held on 18 May at 10:00.

Rank	Heat	Lane	Name	Nationality	Time	Notes
1	4	4	László Cseh	Hungary	1:54.51	Q
2	4	5	Tamás Kenderesi	Hungary	1:54.79	Q
3	2	4	Viktor Bromer	Denmark	1:56.67	Q
4	2	3	Giacomo Carini	Italy	1:57.30	Q
5	2	5	Bence Biczó	Hungary	1:57.60	
6	2	0	Antani Ivanov	Bulgaria	1:57.76	Q
7	4	3	Stefanos Dimitriadis	Greece	1:57.99	Q
8	3	3	Carlos Peralta	Spain	1:58.28	Q
9	3	1	Robert Žbogar	Slovenia	1:58.36	Q
10	3	4	Jan Świtkowski	Poland	1:58.51	Q
11	2	2	Nils Liess	Switzerland	1:58.52	Q
12	2	7	Ioannis Drymonakos	Greece	1:58.57	Q
13	4	2	Nuno Quintanilha	Portugal	1:58.74	Q
14	2	6	Markus Gierke	Germany	1:58.75	Q
15	3	7	Benjamin Grátz	Hungary	1:58.87	
16	4	9	Sindri Jakobsson	Norway	1:58.93	Q
17	3	5	Louis Croenen	Belgium	1:59.03	Q
18	2	1	Jesper Björk	Sweden	1:59.08	Q
19	3	6	Nikolay Skvortsov	Russia	1:59.09	
20	4	6	Alexander Kunert	Germany	1:59.10	
21	3	2	Jan Šefl	Czech Republic	1:59.30	
22	4	0	Etay Gurevich	Israel	1:59.60	
23	1	4	Kaan Özcan	Turkey	1:59.87	
24	3	8	Miguel Nascimento	Portugal	1:59.94	
25	3	0	Tomáš Havránek	Czech Republic	2:00.14	
26	3	9	Brendan Hyland	Ireland	2:00.21	
27	4	1	Alexandru Coci	Romania	2:00.49	
28	4	7	Paul Lemaire	France	2:00.63	
29	1	6	Richárd Nagy	Slovakia	2:00.69	
30	2	9	Filip Milcevic	Austria	2:00.95	
31	1	7	Osvald Nitski	Estonia	2:01.46	
32	1	5	Petr Novák	Czech Republic	2:01.52	
33	2	8	Yonatan Batsha	Israel	2:01.61	
34	1	3	Tim Slanschek	Switzerland	2:01.66	
35	1	2	Nico van Duijn	Switzerland	2:01.96	
36	1	1	Jakub Maly	Austria	2:03.11	
37	1	8	Arkadi Kalinovski	Estonia	2:06.66	
	4	8	Diogo Carvalho	Portugal	DNS	

=== Semifinals ===
The semifinals were held on 18 May at 19:03.

==== Semifinal 1 ====
Rank	Lane	Name	Nationality	Time	Notes
1	4	Tamás Kenderesi	Hungary	1:56.02	Q
2	5	Giacomo Carini	Italy	1:56.81	Q
3	3	Stefanos Dimitriadis	Greece	1:57.44	Q
4	6	Robert Žbogar	Slovenia	1:58.39	
5	8	Jesper Björk	Sweden	1:58.49	
6	2	Nils Liess	Switzerland	1:58.83	
7	7	Nuno Quintanilha	Portugal	1:59.10	
8	1	Sindri Jakobsson	Norway	1:59.12	

==== Semifinal 2 ====
Rank	Lane	Name	Nationality	Time	Notes
1	4	László Cseh	Hungary	1:54.29	Q, CR
2	5	Viktor Bromer	Denmark	1:55.28	Q
3	2	Jan Świtkowski	Poland	1:56.67	Q
4	6	Carlos Peralta	Spain	1:56.92	Q
5	8	Louis Croenen	Belgium	1:57.56	Q
6	3	Antani Ivanov	Bulgaria	1:57.90	
7	1	Markus Gierke	Germany	1:58.13	
8	7	Ioannis Drymonakos	Greece	1:58.79	

=== Final ===
The final was held on 19 May at 19:06.

Rank	Lane	Name	Nationality	Time	Notes
1st place, gold medalist(s)	4	László Cseh	Hungary	1:52.91	CR
2nd place, silver medalist(s)	5	Viktor Bromer	Denmark	1:55.35	
3rd place, bronze medalist(s)	3	Tamás Kenderesi	Hungary	1:55.39	
4	6	Jan Świtkowski	Poland	1:56.22	
5	7	Carlos Peralta	Spain	1:56.42	
6	8	Louis Croenen	Belgium	1:56.65	
7	2	Giacomo Carini	Italy	1:56.81	
8	1	Stefanos Dimitriadis	Greece	1:57.02	
