= Swimming at the 2017 World Aquatics Championships – Men's 50 metre butterfly =

Men's 50 metre butterfly at the 2017 World Aquatics Championships
- Venue: Danube Arena
- Location: Budapest, Hungary
- Dates: 23 July (heats and semifinals); 24 July (final)
- Competitors: 84 from 78 nations
- Winning time: 22.75

Medalists
gold medal	Ben Proud	Great Britain
silver medal	Nicholas Santos	Brazil
bronze medal	Andriy Govorov	Ukraine

The Men's 50 metre butterfly competition at the 2017 World Championships was held on 23 and 24 July 2017.

== Records ==
Prior to the competition, the existing world and championship records were as follows.

World record	Rafael Muñoz (ESP)	22.43	Málaga, Spain	5 April 2009
Competition record	Milorad Čavić (SRB)	22.67	Rome, Italy	27 July 2009

== Results ==
=== Heats ===
The heats were held on 23 July at 10:33.

Rank	Heat	Lane	Name	Nationality	Time	Notes
1	8	4	Andriy Govorov	Ukraine	22.92	Q
2	8	5	Caeleb Dressel	United States	22.97	Q
3	8	7	Joseph Schooling	Singapore	23.05	Q, AS
4	7	4	Ben Proud	Great Britain	23.11	Q
5	9	4	Nicholas Santos	Brazil	23.24	Q
6	9	5	Henrique Martins	Brazil	23.34	Q
7	7	3	Tim Phillips	United States	23.38	Q
8	9	3	László Cseh	Hungary	23.41	Q
9	9	6	Konrad Czerniak	Poland	23.42	Q
10	7	2	Evgeny Sedov	Russia	23.49	Q
11	7	6	Piero Codia	Italy	23.50	Q
12	8	8	Sebastian Sabo	Serbia	23.51	Q
13	9	1	Mathys Goosen	Netherlands	23.52	Q, NR
14	9	2	Andriy Khloptsov	Ukraine	23.54	Q
15	8	6	Yauhen Tsurkin	Belarus	23.55	Q
16	8	2	Yahor Dodaleu	Belarus	23.66	Q
17	7	5	Oleg Kostin	Russia	23.68	
18	5	4	Luis Martínez	Guatemala	23.71	
19	6	6	Dylan Carter	Trinidad and Tobago	23.73	
20	7	1	Kristian Golomeev	Greece	23.85	
21	8	3	Li Zhuhao	China	23.86	
22	7	7	Shi Yang	China	23.91	
22	9	7	Riku Poytäkivi	Finland	23.91	
24	6	5	Benjamin Hockin	Paraguay	23.93	
25	9	0	Daniel Zaitsev	Estonia	23.94	
26	7	0	Santiago Grassi	Argentina	23.99	
27	7	9	Marcus Schlesinger	Israel	24.00	
28	7	8	Damian Wierling	Germany	24.09	
28	9	9	Jan Šefl	Czech Republic	24.09	
30	8	1	Tadas Duškinas	Lithuania	24.10	
31	8	0	Adilbek Mussin	Kazakhstan	24.13	
32	8	9	Douglas Erasmus	South Africa	24.17	
33	9	8	David Morgan	Australia	24.19	
34	6	3	Artyom Kozlyuk	Uzbekistan	24.20	
35	6	1	Omar Eissa	Egypt	24.43	
36	6	4	Yang Jung-doo	South Korea	24.45	
37	5	5	Josiah Binnema	Canada	24.50	
38	6	9	Antani Ivanov	Bulgaria	24.54	
39	6	8	Ralph Goveia	Zambia	24.56	
40	5	2	Adi Mešetović	Bosnia and Herzegovina	24.58	
41	6	7	Justin Plaschka	Jamaica	24.63	
41	6	0	Nikolajs Maskaļenko	Latvia	24.63	
43	6	2	Glenn Victor Sutanto	Indonesia	24.65	
44	5	8	Kaan Ayar	Turkey	24.73	
45	5	3	Pavel Izbisciuc	Moldova	24.80	
46	4	4	Mehdi Ansari	Iran	25.02	
47	5	1	Bryan Alvaréz	Costa Rica	25.06	
48	2	6	Issa Mohamed	Kenya	25.12	
49	5	9	Cherantha de Silva	Sri Lanka	25.15	
50	5	6	Anthony Barbar	Lebanon	25.17	
51	4	5	N'Nhyn Fernander	Bahamas	25.20	
52	5	7	Oliver Elliot	Chile	25.23	
53	4	3	Boško Radulović	Montenegro	25.24	
54	4	6	José Alberto Quintanilla	Bolivia	25.35	
55	5	0	Nazim Belkhodja	Algeria	25.43	
56	1	7	Thibaut Danho	Ivory Coast	25.74	
57	4	1	Stefano Mitchell	Antigua and Barbuda	25.98	
58	4	7	Narang Pornsiriporn	Thailand	25.99	
59	2	4	Yellow Yeiyah	Nigeria	26.11	
60	3	7	Abdullah Al-Doori	Iraq	26.28	
61	2	2	Daniel Francisco	Angola	26.33	
62	2	8	Denilson da Costa	Mozambique	26.35	
63	4	8	Hilal Hemed Hilal	Tanzania	26.40	
64	4	0	Vahan Mkhitaryan	Armenia	26.44	
65	4	9	George Jabbour	Honduras	26.69	
66	3	8	Myagmaryn Delgerkhüü	Mongolia	26.95	
67	3	4	Jayhan Odlum-Smith	Saint Lucia	26.99	
68	3	0	Adam Moncherry	Seychelles	27.23	
69	3	9	Thol Thoeun	Cambodia	27.45	
70	3	5	Lum Zhaveli	Kosovo	27.47	
71	1	4	Joseph Denobrega	Guyana	27.50	
72	1	3	Belly-Cresus Ganira	Burundi	27.52	
73	3	6	Kaleo Kihleng	Federated States of Micronesia	27.98	
74	1	0	Anubhav Subba	Nepal	28.26	
75	3	1	Ismah Serunjoji	Uganda	28.57	
76	1	5	Albachir Mouctar	Niger	29.63	
77	2	5	Slava Sihanouvong	Laos	29.81	
78	1	6	Papy Dossous	Haiti	30.08	
79	2	1	Athoumane Solihi	Comoros	30.53	
80	2	7	Andrew Lapuka	Tonga	30.59	
81	1	2	Osman Kamara	Sierra Leone	33.70	
	1	1	Momodou Saine	Gambia	DNS	
	1	8	Abeiku Jackson	Ghana	DNS	
	2	3	Ruslan Nazarov	Turkmenistan	DNS	
	2	0	Mohammad Rajabi	Afghanistan	DNS	
	2	9	Alpha Diallo	Guinea	DNS	
	3	3	Yaaqoub Al-Saadi	United Arab Emirates	DNS	
	3	2	Dillon Gooding	Saint Vincent and the Grenadines	DSQ	
	4	2	Oumar Toure	Mali	DSQ	

=== Semifinals ===
The semifinals were held on 23 July at 17:53.

==== Semifinal 1 ====
Rank	Lane	Name	Nationality	Time	Notes
1	4	Caeleb Dressel	United States	22.76	Q, NR
2	5	Ben Proud	Great Britain	22.92	Q
3	3	Henrique Martins	Brazil	23.13	Q
4	1	Andriy Khloptsov	Ukraine	23.31	Q, WJ
5	6	László Cseh	Hungary	23.51	
6	7	Sebastian Sabo	Serbia	23.54	
7	8	Yahor Dodaleu	Belarus	23.71	
8	2	Evgeny Sedov	Russia	23.72	

==== Semifinal 2 ====
Rank	Lane	Name	Nationality	Time	Notes
1	4	Andriy Govorov	Ukraine	22.77	Q
2	3	Nicholas Santos	Brazil	22.84	Q
3	5	Joseph Schooling	Singapore	22.93	Q, AS
4	6	Tim Phillips	United States	23.25	Q
5	2	Konrad Czerniak	Poland	23.37	
6	7	Piero Codia	Italy	23.41	
7	1	Mathys Goosen	Netherlands	23.52	=NR
8	8	Yauhen Tsurkin	Belarus	23.62	

=== Final ===
The final was held on 24 July at 18:17.

Rank	Lane	Name	Nationality	Time	Notes
1st place, gold medalist(s)	6	Ben Proud	Great Britain	22.75	NR
2nd place, silver medalist(s)	3	Nicholas Santos	Brazil	22.79	
3rd place, bronze medalist(s)	5	Andriy Govorov	Ukraine	22.84	
4	4	Caeleb Dressel	United States	22.89	
5	2	Joseph Schooling	Singapore	22.95	
6	7	Henrique Martins	Brazil	23.14	
7	8	Andriy Khloptsov	Ukraine	23.31	
8	1	Tim Phillips	United States	23.38	
