= Swimming at the 2016 European Aquatics Championships – Women's 400 metre individual medley =

Women's 400 metre individual medley at the 2016 European Aquatics Championships
- Dates: 16 May
- Competitors: 25 from 14 nations
- Winning time: 4:30.90

Medalists
gold medal	Katinka Hosszú	Hungary
silver medal	Hannah Miley	Great Britain
bronze medal	Zsuzsanna Jakabos	Hungary

The Women's 400 metre individual medley competition of the 2016 European Aquatics Championships was held on 16 May 2016.

== Records ==
Prior to the competition, the existing world, European and championship records were as follows.

	Name	Nation	Time	Location	Date
World record	Ye Shiwen	China	4:28.43	London	28 July 2012
European record	Katinka Hosszú	Hungary	4:29.89	Marseille	4 March 2016
Championship record	Katinka Hosszú	Hungary	4:31.03	Berlin	18 August 2014

== Results ==
=== Heats ===
The heats were held at 10:51.

Rank	Heat	Lane	Name	Nationality	Time	Notes
1	3	4	Katinka Hosszú	Hungary	4:30.97	Q, CR
2	3	5	Aimee Willmott	Great Britain	4:37.49	Q
3	2	4	Hannah Miley	Great Britain	4:38.91	Q
4	2	3	Zsuzsanna Jakabos	Hungary	4:39.10	Q
5	2	7	Carlotta Toni	Italy	4:39.60	Q
6	3	6	Anja Klinar	Slovenia	4:41.31	Q
7	2	5	Barbora Závadová	Czech Republic	4:41.63	Q
8	2	6	Luisa Trombetti	Italy	4:41.87	Q
9	3	3	Lara Grangeon	France	4:42.92	
10	3	2	Stefania Pirozzi	Italy	4:43.42	
11	3	7	Sara Franceschi	Italy	4:44.28	
12	2	2	Georgia Coates	Great Britain	4:44.62	
13	1	6	Wendy van der Zanden	Netherlands	4:44.73	
14	2	8	Paula Żukowska	Poland	4:45.88	
15	3	8	Victoria Kaminskaya	Portugal	4:46.45	
16	3	1	Abbie Wood	Great Britain	4:48.01	
17	2	1	Jördis Steinegger	Austria	4:48.76	
18	1	4	Kristýna Horská	Czech Republic	4:50.71	
19	3	0	Tanja Kylliaeinen	Finland	4:50.86	
20	2	0	Julia Mrozinski	Germany	4:52.19	
21	1	5	Jaqueline Hippi	Sweden	4:53.89	
22	3	9	Patricia Aschan	Finland	4:55.71	
23	1	3	Tereza Horáková	Czech Republic	4:56.16	
24	2	9	Diana Duraes	Portugal	4:57.95	
25	1	2	Sara Nysted	Faroe Islands	5:15.48	

=== Final ===
The final was held at 18:35.

Rank	Lane	Name	Nationality	Time	Notes
1st place, gold medalist(s)	4	Katinka Hosszú	Hungary	4:30.90	CR
2nd place, silver medalist(s)	3	Hannah Miley	Great Britain	4:35.27	
3rd place, bronze medalist(s)	6	Zsuzsanna Jakabos	Hungary	4:38.39	
4	5	Aimee Willmott	Great Britain	4:40.08	
5	2	Carlotta Toni	Italy	4:40.76	
6	8	Luisa Trombetti	Italy	4:41.03	
7	1	Barbora Závadová	Czech Republic	4:43.11	
8	7	Anja Klinar	Slovenia	4:43.42	
