= Swimming at the 2016 European Aquatics Championships – Women's 200 metre individual medley =

2016 sports event

Women's 200 metre individual medley at the 2016 European Aquatics Championships
- Dates: 18–19 May
- Competitors: 40 from 21 nations
- Winning time: 2:07.30

Medalists
| gold medal | Katinka Hosszú | Hungary |
| silver medal | Siobhan-Marie O'Connor | Great Britain |
| bronze medal | Hannah Miley | Great Britain |

The Women's 200 metre individual medley competition of the 2016 European Aquatics Championships was held on 18 and 19 May 2016.

== Records ==
Prior to the competition, the existing world, European and championship records were as follows.

| | Name | Nation | Time | Location | Date |
|---|---|---|---|---|---|
| World record | Katinka Hosszú | Hungary | 2:06.12 | Kazan | 3 August 2015 |
| European record | Katinka Hosszú | Hungary | 2:06.12 | Kazan | 3 August 2015 |
| Championship record | Katinka Hosszú | Hungary | 2:08.11 | Berlin | 21 August 2014 |

== Results ==
=== Heats ===
The heats were held on 18 May at 10:14.

| Rank | Heat | Lane | Name | Nationality | Time | Notes |
|---|---|---|---|---|---|---|
| 1 | 4 | 4 | Katinka Hosszú | Hungary | 2:11.55 | Q |
| 2 | 2 | 4 | Hannah Miley | Great Britain | 2:12.43 | Q |
| 3 | 3 | 4 | Siobhan-Marie O'Connor | Great Britain | 2:12.76 | Q |
| 4 | 2 | 6 | Carlotta Toni | Italy | 2:13.01 | Q |
| 5 | 2 | 5 | Evelyn Verrasztó | Hungary | 2:13.13 | Q |
| 6 | 4 | 5 | Zsuzsanna Jakabos | Hungary | 2:13.29 | |
| 7 | 4 | 6 | Sara Franceschi | Italy | 2:13.34 | Q |
| 8 | 3 | 5 | Barbora Závadová | Czech Republic | 2:14.23 | Q |
| 9 | 3 | 3 | Ilaria Cusinato | Italy | 2:14.42 | |
| 10 | 4 | 2 | Wendy van der Zanden | Netherlands | 2:14.46 | Q |
| 11 | 3 | 6 | Luisa Trombetti | Italy | 2:14.70 | |
| 12 | 4 | 8 | Maria Ugolkova | Switzerland | 2:14.99 | Q |
| 13 | 4 | 0 | Kristýna Horská | Czech Republic | 2:15.15 | Q |
| 14 | 4 | 3 | Lisa Zaiser | Austria | 2:15.23 | Q |
| 15 | 4 | 9 | Victoria Kaminskaya | Portugal | 2:15.64 | Q |
| 16 | 2 | 7 | Tanja Kylliaeinen | Finland | 2:15.82 | Q |
| 17 | 4 | 7 | Stina Gardell | Sweden | 2:15.92 | Q |
| 18 | 2 | 1 | Anja Klinar | Slovenia | 2:16.19 | Q |
| 19 | 3 | 7 | Marrit Steenbergen | Netherlands | 2:16.35 | Q |
| 20 | 3 | 2 | Africa Zamorano | Spain | 2:16.40 | |
| 21 | 2 | 2 | Maxine Wolters | Germany | 2:16.66 | |
| 22 | 1 | 4 | Tjaša Pintar | Slovenia | 2:16.69 | |
| 23 | 3 | 0 | Lena Kreundl | Austria | 2:16.87 | |
| 24 | 3 | 9 | Jaqueline Hippi | Sweden | 2:16.90 | |
| 25 | 2 | 8 | Ana Radić | Croatia | 2:16.91 | |
| 26 | 3 | 8 | Julia Mrozinski | Germany | 2:17.04 | |
| 27 | 4 | 1 | Réka György | Hungary | 2:17.35 | |
| 28 | 1 | 5 | Sycerika McMahon | Ireland | 2:17.52 | |
| 29 | 1 | 7 | Patricia Aschan | Finland | 2:17.67 | |
| 30 | 2 | 3 | Louise Hansson | Sweden | 2:17.69 | |
| 31 | 1 | 2 | Katarzyna Baranowska | Poland | 2:17.76 | |
| 32 | 2 | 0 | Amit Ivry | Israel | 2:17.95 | |
| 33 | 3 | 1 | Abbie Wood | Great Britain | 2:18.06 | |
| 34 | 2 | 9 | Gizem Bozkurt | Turkey | 2:18.07 | |
| 35 | 1 | 6 | Jördis Steinegger | Austria | 2:18.85 | |
| 36 | 1 | 1 | Tereza Horáková | Czech Republic | 2:19.03 | |
| 37 | 1 | 3 | Jessica Steiger | Germany | 2:19.14 | |
| 38 | 1 | 8 | Margaret Markvardt | Estonia | 2:21.76 | |
| 39 | 1 | 0 | Sara Nysted | Faroe Islands | 2:22.02 | |
| 40 | 1 | 9 | Tatiana Perstniova | Moldova | 2:29.66 | |

=== Semifinals ===
The semifinals were held on 18 May at 18:32.

==== Semifinal 1 ====
| Rank | Lane | Name | Nationality | Time | Notes |
|---|---|---|---|---|---|
| 1 | 4 | Hannah Miley | Great Britain | 2:12.39 | Q |
| 2 | 3 | Sara Franceschi | Italy | 2:12.95 | Q |
| 3 | 5 | Carlotta Toni | Italy | 2:13.92 | Q |
| 4 | 6 | Wendy van der Zanden | Netherlands | 2:14.18 | Q |
| 5 | 1 | Stina Gardell | Sweden | 2:14.42 | |
| 6 | 2 | Kristýna Horská | Czech Republic | 2:15.31 | |
| 7 | 7 | Victoria Kaminskaya | Portugal | 2:16.00 | |
| 8 | 8 | Marrit Steenbergen | Netherlands | 2:16.42 | |

==== Semifinal 2 ====
| Rank | Lane | Name | Nationality | Time | Notes |
|---|---|---|---|---|---|
| 1 | 4 | Katinka Hosszú | Hungary | 2:08.60 | Q |
| 2 | 5 | Siobhan-Marie O'Connor | Great Britain | 2:10.17 | Q |
| 3 | 3 | Evelyn Verrasztó | Hungary | 2:12.93 | Q |
| 4 | 2 | Maria Ugolkova | Switzerland | 2:13.34 | Q |
| 5 | 6 | Barbora Závadová | Czech Republic | 2:14.39 | |
| 6 | 7 | Lisa Zaiser | Austria | 2:14.62 | |
| 7 | 1 | Tanja Kylliaeinen | Finland | 2:15.96 | |
| 8 | 8 | Anja Klinar | Slovenia | 2:17.10 | |

=== Final ===
The final was held on 19 May at 18:15.

| Rank | Lane | Name | Nationality | Time | Notes |
|---|---|---|---|---|---|
| 1st place, gold medalist(s) | 4 | Katinka Hosszú | Hungary | 2:07.30 | CR |
| 2nd place, silver medalist(s) | 5 | Siobhan-Marie O'Connor | Great Britain | 2:09.03 | |
| 3rd place, bronze medalist(s) | 3 | Hannah Miley | Great Britain | 2:11.84 | |
| 4 | 2 | Sara Franceschi | Italy | 2:12.59 | |
| 5 | 6 | Evelyn Verrasztó | Hungary | 2:12.91 | |
| 6 | 1 | Carlotta Toni | Italy | 2:13.17 | |
| 7 | 8 | Wendy van der Zanden | Netherlands | 2:13.31 | |
| 8 | 7 | Maria Ugolkova | Switzerland | 2:13.37 | |
