= Sindri Thor Jakobsson =

Norwegian swimmer

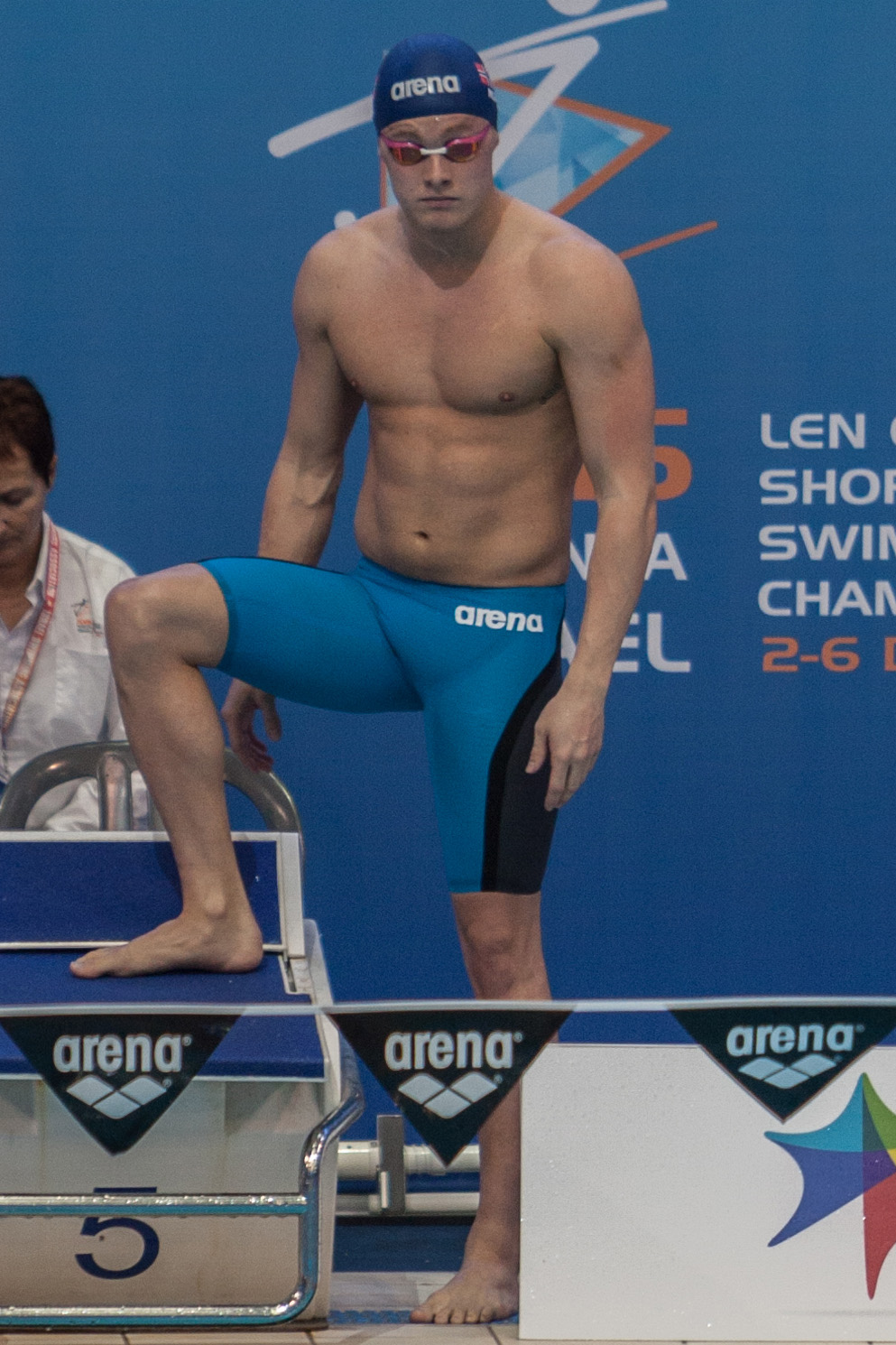
- Sindri Thor Jakobsson at the 2015 European Short Course Swimming Championships

Personal information
- Born: September 24, 1991 (age 35) Iceland

Sport
- Sport: Swimming

Sindri Thor Jakobsson (Icelandic: Sindri Þór Jakobsson; born 24 September 1991) is a Norwegian swimmer of Icelandic origins. He specialises in the butterfly.

== Career ==
Jakobsson is from Iceland, where he swam for Frjálsíþróttafélag ÍBV (until 2012 called Ungmennafélagið Óðinn) in the Vestmannaeyjar, later for Íþróttabandalag Reykjanesbæjar in Reykjanesbær. In the mid-2000s he moved to Norway. After five years living in Bergen, where his club was SK Delfana, he took Norwegian citizenship and renounced his Icelandic citizenship. As of March 2016 he had transferred to Lambertseter Svømmeklubb in Oslo.

At an all-ages national championship meet in 2003, he won four events: the 100 metre and 200 metre butterfly, the 400 metre freestyle and the 200 metre medley. At the Icelandic national championships in 2008 he swam the 200 metre butterfly in 2.07.75 and in the 50 metres equalled his personal best time, 0.26.66; In the 2009 Norwegian championships he won the 1500 metre and 400 metre butterfly.

In April 2012 Jakobsson was one of two team-mates sharing a room with Alexander Dale Oen at a training camp in Flagstaff, Arizona, who discovered him dead in the bathroom; both withdrew from swimming for several months.

At the 2012 European Aquatics Championships he set a Norwegian record of 2.00.96 for the 200 metre butterfly, breaking his own previous record by 24 hundredths of a second. At the 2013 European Short Course Swimming Championships he set a Norwegian record of 52.34 seconds for the 100 metre butterfly, breaking his own previous record of 53.29 seconds; he failed by three hundredths of a second to equal Aleksander Hetland's Norwegian record of 23.47 seconds for the 50 metre butterfly. At the 2014 European Aquatics Championships, for which he was selected despite not having technically qualified, he again broke his own previous Norwegian record for the 200 metre butterfly, with a time of 1.59.80. At the 2015 European Short Course Swimming Championships he broke his own Norwegian record for the 100 metre butterfly with a time of 51.99 seconds, and broke it again with 51.77 seconds in the semi-finals. He also set a new Norwegian record in the 200 metre medley, 1.56.15. In 2016 he won 13 gold medals, seven individual, at the Norwegian Short Course Championships, and again set a new record for the 200 metre butterfly, 1.58.85, at the Bergen Swim Festival.

Jakobsson set a Norwegian senior record of 1.58.93 in the 200 metre butterfly at the 2016 European Aquatics Championships, but did not qualify for the 2016 Summer Olympics. In October 2016 he announced his retirement on Facebook.
