= Swimming at the 2018 European Aquatics Championships – Men's 4 × 100 metre freestyle relay =

Men's 4 × 100 metre freestyle relay at the 2018 European Aquatics Championships
- Venue: Tollcross International Swimming Centre
- Dates: 3 August
- Competitors: 81 from 19 nations
- Teams: 19
- Winning time: 3:12.23

Medalists
gold medal	Evgeny Rylov; Danila Izotov; Vladimir Morozov; Kliment Kolesnikov; Vladislav Grinev; Ivan Kuzmenko; Sergey Fesikov; Andrey Zhilkin	Russia
silver medal	Luca Dotto; Ivano Vendrame; Lorenzo Zazzeri; Alessandro Miressi	Italy
bronze medal	Jan Świtkowski; Konrad Czerniak; Jakub Kraska; Kacper Majchrzak; Jan Hołub	Poland

The Men's 4 × 100 metre freestyle relay competition of the 2018 European Aquatics Championships was held on 3 August 2018.

== Records ==
Before the competition, the existing world and championship records were as follows.

	Team	Time	Location	Date
World record	United States	3:08.24	Beijing	11 August 2008
European record	France	3:08.32	Beijing	11 August 2008
Championship record	France	3:11.64	Berlin	18 August 2014

== Results ==
=== Heats ===
The heats were started at 11:12.

Rank	Heat	Lane	Nation	Swimmers	Time	Notes
1	1	3	Italy	Luca Dotto (48.88); Ivano Vendrame (49.16); Lorenzo Zazzeri (48.59); Alessandro Miressi (48.66)	3:15.29	Q
2	2	7	Poland	Konrad Czerniak (49.14); Jan Hołub (49.05); Jakub Kraska (48.77); Jan Świtkowski (48.49)	3:15.45	Q
3	1	1	Hungary	Dominik Kozma (49.45); Nándor Németh (48.32); Péter Holoda (48.95); Richárd Bohus (48.83)	3:15.55	Q
4	1	4	Russia	Vladislav Grinev (48.67); Ivan Kuzmenko (49.55); Sergey Fesikov (48.28); Andrey Zhilkin (49.27)	3:15.77	Q
5	2	6	Serbia	Velimir Stjepanović (49.28); Uroš Nikolić (48.82); Andrej Barna (49.11); Ivan Lenđer (48.69)	3:15.90	Q
6	2	0	Netherlands	Stan Pijnenburg (49.34); Nyls Korstanje (49.10); Kyle Stolk (49.07); Jesse Puts (49.27)	3:16.78	Q
7	2	1	Germany	Damian Wierling (48.95); Marius Kusch (49.24); Peter Varjasi (49.48); Christoph Fildebrandt (49.12)	3:16.79	Q
8	2	8	Greece	Andreas Vazaios (49.58); Kristian Golomeev (48.04); Odysseus Meladinis (49.77); Apostolos Christou (49.49)	3:16.88	Q
9	2	9	France	Clément Mignon (50.07); Maxime Grousset (48.89); Jordan Pothain (49.93); Mehdy Metella (48.26)	3:17.15	
10	2	4	Great Britain	Calum Jarvis (49.68); Craig McLean (49.41); David Cumberlidge (49.83); James Guy (48.39)	3:17.31	
10	2	2	Sweden	Robin Hanson (49.72); Christoffer Carlsen (48.73); Björn Seeliger (49.44); Isak Eliasson (49.42)	3:17.31	
12	1	2	Ireland	Shane Ryan (49.05); David Thompson (49.63); Jordan Sloan (49.13); Robert Powell (49.74)	3:17.55	
13	2	5	Lithuania	Danas Rapšys (49.21); Simonas Bilis (48.62); Deividas Margevičius (50.25); Tomas Sungaila (49.80)	3:17.88	
14	1	6	Belgium	Sebastien De Meulemeester (50.31); Emmanuel Vanluchene (49.25); Valentin Borisavljevic (49.94); Jasper Aerents (48.86)	3:18.36	
15	2	3	Austria	Bernhard Reitshammer (50.26); Robin Gruenberger (49.78); Heiko Gigler (49.64); Alexander Trampitsch (49.23)	3:18.91	
16	1	7	Israel	Meiron Cheruti (49.94); Denis Loktev (49.85); Ziv Kalontarov (50.19); David Gamburg (49.42)	3:19.40	
17	1	8	Turkey	Yalım Acımış (50.58); Doğa Çelik (49.93); İskender Baslakov (49.89); Kemal Arda Gürdal (49.88)	3:20.28	
18	1	5	Belarus	Viktar Krasochka (50.45); Mikita Tsmyh (50.19); Viktar Staselovich (50.36); Anton Latkin (50.35)	3:21.35	
—	1	0	Estonia	Nikita Tsernosev (51.83); Kregor Zirk (49.79); Andri Aedma (51.12); Marko-Matteus Langel ()	Disqualified	

=== Final ===
The final was held at 18:10.

Rank	Lane	Nation	Swimmers	Time	Notes
1st place, gold medalist(s)	6	Russia	Evgeny Rylov (48.62); Danila Izotov (48.61); Vladimir Morozov (47.61); Kliment Kolesnikov (47.39)	3:12.23	
2nd place, silver medalist(s)	4	Italy	Luca Dotto (48.63); Ivano Vendrame (48.73); Lorenzo Zazzeri (48.55); Alessandro Miressi (46.99)	3:12.90	
3rd place, bronze medalist(s)	5	Poland	Jan Świtkowski (48.68); Konrad Czerniak (49.04); Jakub Kraska (48.07); Kacper Majchrzak (48.41)	3:14.20	
4	3	Hungary	Nándor Németh (48.61); Dominik Kozma (48.63); Péter Holoda (48.62); Richárd Bohus (48.65)	3:14.51	
5	8	Greece	Andreas Vazaios (49.13); Apostolos Christou (48.75); Odysseus Meladinis (49.13); Kristian Golomeev (47.51)	3:14.52	
6	7	Netherlands	Nyls Korstanje (48.87); Kyle Stolk (48.69); Jesse Puts (48.90); Stan Pijnenburg (48.14)	3:14.60	
7	1	Germany	Damian Wierling (48.61); Marius Kusch (48.59); Peter Varjasi (49.17); Christoph Fildebrandt (48.75)	3:15.12	
8	2	Serbia	Velimir Stjepanović (49.03); Uroš Nikolić (48.62); Andrej Barna (48.78); Ivan Lenđer (48.73)	3:15.16	NR
