= Ben Proud =

British swimmer (born 1994)

Personal information
- Full name: Benjamin Ross Proud
- National team: Great Britain
- Born: 21 September 1994 (age 32) London, England
- Height: 1.91 m (6 ft 3 in)
- Weight: 94 kg (207 lb)

Sport
- Sport: Swimming
- Strokes: Freestyle, butterfly
- Club: Energy Standard
- Coach: James Gibson 2016–present Jon Rudd To 2016
Medal record
Men's swimming
Representing Great Britain
Olympic Games
Silver medal – second place	2024 Paris	50 m freestyle
World Championships (LC)
Gold medal – first place	2017 Budapest	50 m butterfly
Gold medal – first place	2022 Budapest	50 m freestyle
Silver medal – second place	2025 Singapore	50 m freestyle
Bronze medal – third place	2017 Budapest	50 m freestyle
Bronze medal – third place	2023 Fukuoka	50 m freestyle
Bronze medal – third place	2024 Doha	50 m freestyle
World Championships (SC)
Gold medal – first place	2021 Abu Dhabi	50 m freestyle
Silver medal – second place	2022 Melbourne	50 m freestyle
European Championships (LC)
Gold medal – first place	2014 Berlin	4x100 m medley
Gold medal – first place	2018 Glasgow	50 m freestyle
Gold medal – first place	2022 Rome	50 m freestyle
Silver medal – second place	2018 Glasgow	50 m butterfly
Silver medal – second place	2021 Budapest	50 m freestyle
Bronze medal – third place	2014 Berlin	50 m butterfly
Bronze medal – third place	2016 London	50 m freestyle
Bronze medal – third place	2016 London	50 m butterfly
European Championships (SC)
Gold medal – first place	2023 Otopeni	50 m freestyle
Gold medal – first place	2023 Otopeni	4x50 m freestyle
Gold medal – first place	2023 Otopeni	4x50 m mixed freestyle
Silver medal – second place	2017 Copenhagen	50 m freestyle
Bronze medal – third place	2017 Copenhagen	50 m butterfly
Representing England
Commonwealth Games
Gold medal – first place	2014 Glasgow	50 m freestyle
Gold medal – first place	2014 Glasgow	50 m butterfly
Gold medal – first place	2018 Gold Coast	50 m freestyle
Gold medal – first place	2022 Birmingham	50 m freestyle
Gold medal – first place	2022 Birmingham	50 m butterfly
Silver medal – second place	2018 Gold Coast	4×100 m freestyle
Silver medal – second place	2018 Gold Coast	4×100 m medley
Bronze medal – third place	2014 Glasgow	4×100 m freestyle

Benjamin Ross Proud (born 21 September 1994) is an English competitive swimmer, who represented Great Britain at the Olympic Games, the FINA World Aquatics Championships and LEN European Aquatics Championships, and England at the Commonwealth Games until August 2025.

Proud specialises in sprint freestyle and butterfly races, specifically the 50-metre distance in both. He is the 2022 World Champion in the 50 metre freestyle, his second long course world title. He is the 2017 world champion in the 50-metre butterfly. He is only the third male swimmer to be simultaneously short-course and long-course World Champion at 50 metre freestyle, after César Cielo and Florent Manaudou. in 2024, at his third attempt he won his first Olympic medal, a silver, in the 50 metre freestyle at the 2024 Summer Olympics in Paris.

Proud holds two British national records, as well as being a double Commonwealth Games champion in both the 50 m butterfly (2014 and 2022) and 50 m freestyle (2014, 2018 and 2022) events. He was European Champion over 50 metres freestyle in 2018 and 2022, and was part of the 4 x 100 medley team from Great Britain which won European gold in 2014.

In 2025, Proud announced his intention to retire permanently from 'traditional' swimming as recognised by World Aquatics, European Aquatics and the International Olympic Committee to take up opportunities at the Enhanced Games, a private sports event that allows doping in its athletes.

== Early life and education ==
Proud was born in London on 21 September 1994 to Nic and Sally Proud. The family moved to Malaysia when he was five months old, and he grew up in Damansara, Kuala Lumpur. He has a brother, Oliver. He attended the Alice Smith School from kindergarten until year 12 of the school. At Alice Smith, he competed for the school and was trained by Francis Kiu, a professional Malaysian swimmer. He swam for the school swimming team, KLASS Torpedoes, representing them at many international swim meets. He swam at the Malaysian Open, winning the 50 m butterfly and placing second in the 50 m freestyle. His many swim meets across Southeast Asia included the Flying Fish meet in Phuket, Thailand.

In 2011, when he was 16, he returned to England to pursue swimming as a career, and joined Plymouth College as a swimming scholar. After finishing school, he attended University of St Mark & St John where he studied for a Sports Development & Coaching degree. Proud was coached by Jon Rudd at the Plymouth Leander Swimming Programme in England, before he moved to train at the Energy Standard International Swim Club in Turkey in 2017.

== Swimming career ==
Proud won a silver medal in the 50 m butterfly -his strongest event- in the European Junior Championships, which put him on the map as the fastest British sprinter at the British Gas International Meet in 2013, winning a gold in the butterfly, and going on later to win a silver in the 50 m freestyle in Leeds. After his initial victories, he rose through the ranks and broke the decade-long 50 m butterfly standing record twice, in the semis and final, giving him his first British Gas Swimming Championship title at the age of 19.

He went on to break his personal best times for the 50 m and 100 m freestyle events, earning himself a silver and bronze, as well as a spot on the British team for the 2013 World Championships held in Barcelona. Proud finished 18th in the 50 m freestyle, and 11th in the 50 m butterfly. In 2014, still only 19 years old, Proud won his first senior international medals on his Commonwealth debut for England at Glasgow. The following month, Proud won a gold in the 4 × 100 m medley relay and a bronze in the 50 m butterfly for Team GB at his first European Championships.

In the 2016 European Aquatics Championships in London, he won two bronze medals, first in 50m butterfly, then in 50m freestyle.

Proud represented Great Britain in the 50 m and 100 m freestyle events at the 2016 Summer Olympics.

=== 2017 ===
At the 2017 World Aquatics Championships, Proud qualified as the fourth fastest swimmer at the 50m butterfly semi-finals, but won a surprise gold at the final with a national record time of 22.75 seconds. He won a further bronze in the 50m freestyle in 21.43 seconds.

=== 2018–2019 ===
At the 2018 Commonwealth Games held at the Gold Coast, Australia, Proud won silver as part of the relay team with David Cumberlidge, Jarvis Parkinson and James Guy that came second in the 4 × 100 m freestyle events. He broke his own Games record in the heats of the 50m freestyle with 21.45 seconds, then 21.30 in the semi-finals and went on to win the final in 21.35. He also won a silver in the 4 × 100 m medley with Adam Peaty, James Guy and Luke Greenbank. He broke his own 50m freestyle British record at the Sette Colli meet in Rome, posting a Commonwealth record of 21.16 in the final to become the 4th fastest performer of all time over the distance.

At the 2018 European Championships in Glasgow, Proud won a silver in the 50-metre butterfly. He then broke the 50-meter freestyle textile world record with 21.11 in the semi-finals of the 50-metre freestyle, and won his first gold of the European championships in the final.

In the Autumn of 2019 he was member of the inaugural International Swimming League swimming for the Energy Standard Swim Club, who won the team title in Las Vegas, Nevada, in December.

=== 2021–22 ===
At the European Championships held in Budapest in May 2021, Proud won a silver in the 50 m freestyle.

A year later, at the 2022 World Aquatics Championships held in Budapest, Proud won gold in the 50 m freestyle event.

Proud took part in the 2022 Commonwealth Games, and won a gold in the 50 m butterfly event.

=== 2023 ===
In 2023, he won the gold medal at the 2023 British Swimming Championships in the 50 metres freestyle. It was the fifth time that he had won the 50 metres event. He was also denied a seventh 50 metres butterfly title by Jacob Peters. In December, Proud won one of the two golds that had so far eluded him, becoming European short-course champion over 50 metre freestyle for the first time.

=== 2024 ===
After winning the 50 metres freestyle at the 2024 Aquatics GB Swimming Championships, Proud sealed his place at the 2024 Summer Olympics. On 2 August 2024 he won the silver medal in the final of the 50m freestyle.

=== 2025 ===
Proud won the 50 metres freestyle event for the third consecutive year and the 50m butterfly title at the 2025 Aquatics GB Swimming Championships. He had already been selected for the 2025 World Aquatics Championships in Singapore but cemented his place in winning the event. Subsequently at the World Championships, he won a silver medal in the 50 metres freestyle and reached the final of the 50 metres butterfly.

== Enhanced Games ==
On 10 September 2025, Proud shared that he was to take part in the Enhanced Games which will allow athletes to use performance-enhancing substances without being subject to drug tests, confirming his retirement from traditional competitive swimming. His decision was widely condemned by British and international sporting organisations, and his National Lottery funding was stopped with immediate effect, although Proud had already indicated his intention to withdraw from the funding pool. Proud won the 50m butterfly in 22.32sec, which was his personal best and the second fastest in the world at 0.05 slower than the official world record set by Andriy Govorov.

== Best times ==
Event	Time (LCM)	Time (SCM)
50 Freestyle	21.11*	20.18*
100 Freestyle	48.52	45.97
50 Butterfly	22.75*	22.18*

- British Record *

== See also ==
- List of Olympic medalists in swimming (men)
- List of World Aquatics Championships medalists in swimming (men)
- List of World Swimming Championships (25 m) medalists (men)
- List of European Aquatics Championships medalists in swimming (men)
- List of European Short Course Swimming Championships medalists (men)
- List of Commonwealth Games medallists in swimming (men)
- List of individual gold medalists in swimming at the Olympics and World Aquatics Championships (men)
