= Thoeun Thol =

Cambodian swimmer

Personal information
- Born: 9 October 1991 (age 34)

Sport
- Sport: Swimming

Thoeun Thol (born 9 October 1991) is a Cambodian swimmer. He competed in the men's 50 metre butterfly event at the 2017 World Aquatics Championships.
