= Elena Prokofyeva =

Russian synchronized swimmer

Personal information
- Full name: Elena Gennadyevna Prokofyeva
- National team: Russia
- Born: 2 August 1994 (age 32) Moscow, Russia
- Height: 1.69 m (5 ft 7 in)
- Weight: 54 kg (119 lb)

Sport
- Sport: Swimming
- Strokes: Synchronized swimming
Medal record
Olympic Games
Gold medal – first place	2016 Rio de Janeiro	Team
World Championships
Gold medal – first place	2013 Barcelona	Team technical routine
Gold medal – first place	2013 Barcelona	Team free routine
Gold medal – first place	2013 Barcelona	Free routine combination
Gold medal – first place	2015 Kazan	Team technical routine
Gold medal – first place	2015 Kazan	Team free routine
Gold medal – first place	2015 Kazan	Free routine combination
European Championships
Gold medal – first place	2014 Berlin	Team routine
Gold medal – first place	2016 London	Team technical routine
Gold medal – first place	2016 London	Combination routine
Summer Universiade
Gold medal – first place	2013 Kazan	Team routine
Gold medal – first place	2013 Kazan	Combined routine

Elena Gennadyevna Prokofyeva (Russian: Елена Геннадьевна Прокофьева, born 2 August 1994) is a Russian synchronized swimmer.

She has won 6 gold medals at World Aquatics Championships, 3 in 2013 and 3 in 2015. She also won a gold medal at the 2014 European Aquatics Championships, as well as 2 gold medals at the 2013 Summer Universiade.
