= Narang Pornsiriporn =

Thai swimmer

Personal information
- Born: 14 April 2001 (age 25)

Sport
- Sport: Swimming

Narang Pornsiriporn (born 14 April 2001) is a Thai swimmer. He competed in the men's 50 metre butterfly event at the 2017 World Aquatics Championships.
