= Jan Hołub =

Polish swimmer

Personal information
- Nationality: Polish
- Born: 21 March 1996 (age 30) Wrocław, Poland

Sport
- Sport: Swimming
- Strokes: Freestyle
Medal record
European Championships (LC)
Bronze medal – third place	2018 Glasgow	4 × 100m freestyle relay
Military World Games
Bronze medal – third place	2019 Wuhan	4×200 m freestyle
Bronze medal – third place	2019 Wuhan	4×100 m medley

Jan Hołub (born 21 March 1996) is a Polish swimmer. He competed in the men's 4 × 100 metre freestyle relay event at the 2018 European Aquatics Championships, winning the bronze medal.
