= Jakub Kraska =

Polish swimmer (born 2000)

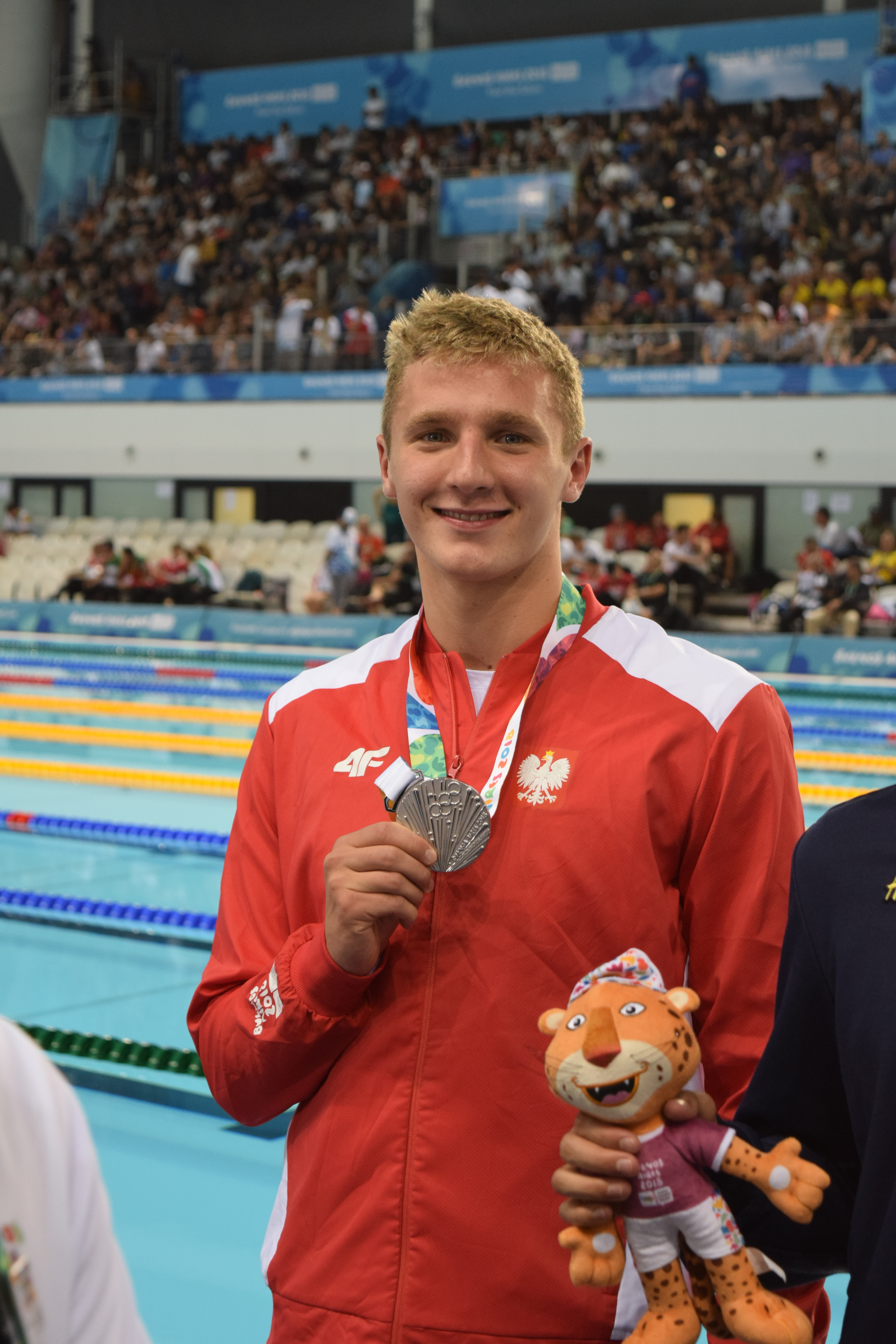
- Kraska at the 2018 Summer Youth Olympics

Personal information
- Nationality: Polish
- Born: 19 April 2000 (age 26)

Sport
- Sport: Swimming
- Strokes: Freestyle
Medal record
European Championships (LC)
Bronze medal – third place	2018 Glasgow	4×100 m freestyle
European Championships (SC)
Silver medal – second place	2019 Glasgow	4×50 m freestyle
Summer Youth Olympics
Silver medal – second place	2018 Buenos Aires	100 m freestyle
Bronze medal – third place	2018 Buenos Aires	4×100 m medley
World Junior Championships
Silver medal – second place	2017 Indianapolis	4×100 m freestyle
World University Games
Gold medal – first place	2021 Chengdu	4×100 m freestyle

Jakub Kraska (born 19 April 2000) is a Polish swimmer. He competed in the men's 4 × 100 metre freestyle relay event at the 2018 European Aquatics Championships, winning the bronze medal.
