= Ari-Pekka Liukkonen =

Finnish swimmer (born 1989)

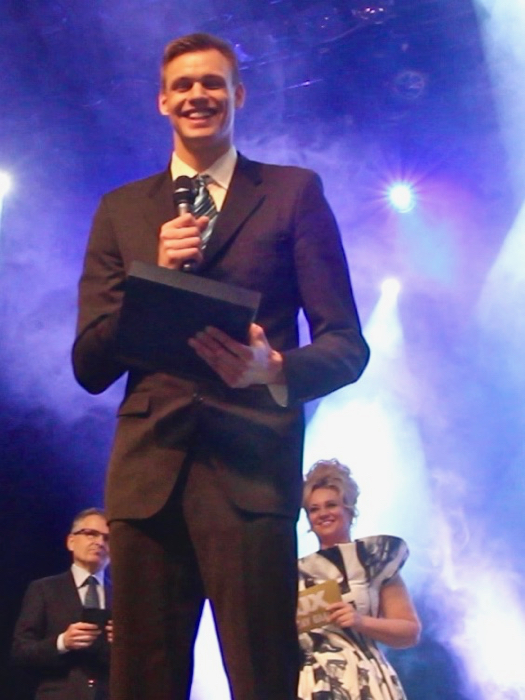
- Liukkonen in 2015

Personal information
- Born: 9 February 1989 (age 37) Pieksämäki, Finland
- Height: 2.08 m (6 ft 10 in)
- Weight: 91 kg (201 lb)
Medal record
Men's swimming
Representing Finland
European Championships (LC)
Gold medal – first place	2020 Budapest	50 m freestyle
Bronze medal – third place	2014 Berlin	50 m freestyle
European Championships (SC)
Bronze medal – third place	2012 Chartres	4×50 m mixed freestyle

Ari-Pekka Liukkonen (born 9 February 1989) is a Finnish swimmer, European champion and Green League's councilman. He competed in the 50 m freestyle event at the 2012 Summer Olympics. He is the Finnish record holder over that distance with a time of 21.58 sec, as well as the short course record in the 50 m. He also holds the 100 m freestyle record, at 49.44 seconds. At the 2016 Olympics he swam in the 50 and 100 m freestyle events.

== Personal life ==
On 2 February 2014, Liukkonen came out as gay in an Yle interview, thus becoming one of the first openly gay top-level athletes in Finland.

== Career in politics ==
Ari-Pekka Liukkonen is a councilman in the Green League in Finland in Jyväskylä. Liukkonen has been elected to the Green League first time in 2017.

Liukkonen was elected to the Green League three times. First time in 2017 by 284 votes, second time in 2021 by 388 votes and third time in 2025 by 422 votes.

Olympic Games
Preceded by Tuuli Petäjä-Sirén	Flagbearer for Finland (with Satu Mäkelä-Nummela); Tokyo 2020	Succeeded by Incumbent
