= Kaan Ayar =

Turkish swimmer (born 1995)

Personal information
- Born: 19 January 1995 (age 31)

Sport
- Sport: Swimming

Kaan Ayar (born 19 January 1995) is a Turkish swimmer. He competed in the men's 50 metre butterfly event at the 2017 World Aquatics Championships.
