= Jan Świtkowski =

Polish swimmer (born 1994)

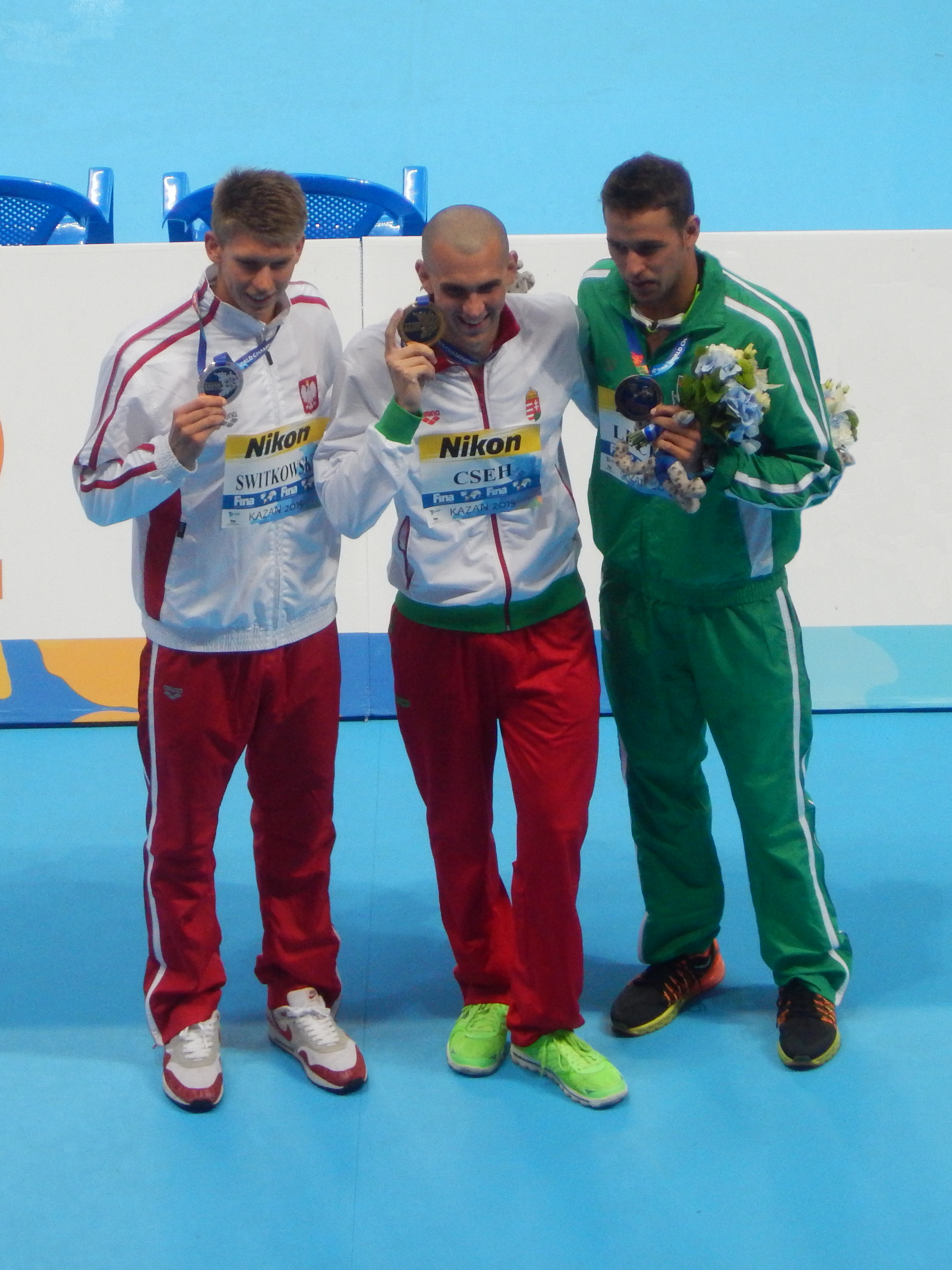
- Jan Świtkowski (left) at the 2015 World Aquatics Championships in Kazan

Personal information
- National team: Poland
- Born: 23 January 1994 (age 32) Lublin, Poland
- Height: 1.93 m (6 ft 4 in)
- Weight: 87 kg (192 lb)

Sport
- Sport: Swimming
- Strokes: Butterfly
- Club: New York Breakers (2020)
- College team: Virginia Tech (U.S.); University of Florida (U.S.)
Medal record
Men's swimming
Representing Poland
World Championships (LC)
Bronze medal – third place	2015 Kazan	200 m butterfly
European Championships (LC)
Bronze medal – third place	2018 Glasgow	4×100 m freestyle

Jan Świtkowski (born 23 January 1994) is a Polish competitive swimmer who specializes in butterfly events. He is a multiple-time Polish champion and a bronze medalist in the 200-meter butterfly at the 2015 World Championships.

While studying in the United States, Switkowski initially attended Virginia Polytechnic Institute and State University in Blacksburg, Virginia, where he swam for the Virginia Tech Hokies under head coach Ned Skinner from 2013 to 2014. Switkowski sat out the 2014–15 season to spend most of the year competing for the Polish national swimming team, before transferring to the University of Florida in Gainesville, Florida, where he competed for the Florida Gators swimming and diving team under head coach Gregg Troy.

At the 2015 World Aquatics Championships in Kazan, Russia, Switkowski put up a sterling effort at 1:54.10 in the final to win the bronze medal in the men's 200-meter butterfly. In the men's 4×200-meter freestyle relay, Switkowski led off with a split of 1:47.03 before the Polish foursome of Kacper Klich, Michał Domagała, and Kacper Majchrzak ended up to eighth at the very end in 7:10.34.

In the inaugural season of the International Swimming League in 2019 he competed for the Cali Condors. In 2020, he joined the New York Breakers for the second ISL season.
