= Luisa Trombetti =

Italian swimmer

Personal information
- Born: 5 September 1993 (age 32) Moncalieri, Italy

Sport
- Sport: Swimming

Luisa Trombetti (born 5 September 1993) is an Italian swimmer. She competed in the women's 400 metre individual medley event at the 2016 Summer Olympics. Trombetti is an athlete of the Gruppo Sportivo Fiamme Oro.
