= 2016 European Aquatics Championships =

Water sport competitions

33rd European Aquatics Championships
- Host city: (United Kingdom) London
- Date(s): 9–22 May 2016
- Venue(s): London Aquatics Centre
- Events: 64

The 2016 European Aquatics Championships took place from 9 to 22 May 2016 in London, United Kingdom, in the London Aquatics Centre. It was the thirty second edition of the event, and the second held in the same year as a Summer Olympics. Hosts Great Britain headed the medal table for the second successive event; although their swimming return was slightly down, partly down to a small number of star names resting prior to Rio, the gap was made up by an outstanding performance in the diving pool.

== Schedule ==
Competition dates by discipline are:

- Swimming: 16–22 May
- Diving: 9–15 May
- Synchronised swimming: 9–13 May

== Medal table ==
* Host nation (Great Britain)

Rank	Nation	Gold	Silver	Bronze	Total
1	Great Britain*	10	11	12	33
2	Hungary	10	4	6	20
3	Russia	10	3	6	19
4	Italy	8	13	11	32
5	Ukraine	5	10	5	20
6	Netherlands	5	4	2	11
7	France	4	1	4	9
8	Sweden	4	0	1	5
9	Germany	3	1	0	4
10	Denmark	2	4	1	7
11	Poland	1	1	0	2
12	Lithuania	1	0	2	3
13	Greece	1	0	1	2
14	Spain	0	3	6	9
15	Iceland	0	2	1	3
16	Israel	0	2	0	2
17	Belgium	0	1	1	2
17	Slovenia	0	1	1	2
19	Norway	0	1	0	1
19	Serbia	0	1	0	1
19	Slovakia	0	1	0	1
22	Finland	0	0	2	2
23	Austria	0	0	1	1
23	Croatia	0	0	1	1
23	Portugal	0	0	1	1
Totals (25 entries)		64	64	65	193

== Records ==
Event	Date	Round	Name	Nationality	Time	Record
Women's 400 m individual medley	16 May	Preliminary	Katinka Hosszú	Hungary	4:30.97	CR
Men's 400 m freestyle	16 May	Final	Gabriele Detti	Italy	3:44.01	CR
Women's 400 m individual medley	16 May	Final	Katinka Hosszú	Hungary	4:30.90	CR
Men's 50 m butterfly	16 May	Semifinal	Andriy Hovorov	Ukraine	22.73	CR
Men's 100 m breaststroke	17 May	Final	Adam Peaty	Great Britain	58.36	CR
Women's 100 m breaststroke	17 May	Semifinal	Rūta Meilutytė	Lithuania	1:06.16	CR
Women's 100 m backstroke	18 May	Preliminary	Mie Nielsen	Denmark	59.26	CR
Men's 1500 m freestyle	18 May	Final	Gregorio Paltrinieri	Italy	14:34.04	ER CR
Men's 200 m butterfly	18 May	Semifinal	László Cseh	Hungary	1:54.29	CR
Women's 100 m backstroke	18 May	Semifinal	Mie Nielsen	Denmark	59.16	CR
Women's 200 m individual medley	19 May	Final	Katinka Hosszú	Hungary	2:07.30	CR
Women's 100 m butterfly	19 May	Semifinal	Sarah Sjöström	Sweden	56.12	CR
Women's 100 m backstroke	19 May	Final	Mie Nielsen	Denmark	58.73	CR
Men's 200 m butterfly	19 May	Final	László Cseh	Hungary	1:52.91	CR
Men's 800 m freestyle	20 May	Final	Gregorio Paltrinieri	Italy	7:42.33	CR
Women's 100 m butterfly	20 May	Final	Sarah Sjöström	Sweden	55.89	CR
4 × 100 m mixed freestyle relay	20 May	Final	Sebastiaan Verschuren; Ben Schwietert; Maud van der Meer; Ranomi Kromowidjojo	Netherlands	3:23.64	CR
Women's 1500 m freestyle	21 May	Final	Boglárka Kapás	Hungary	15:50.22	CR
Men's 100 m butterfly	21 May	Final	László Cseh	Hungary	50.86	CR
Women's 50 m backstroke	21 May	Final	Francesca Halsall	Great Britain	27.57	CR
Women's 50 m freestyle	22 May	Final	Ranomi Kromowidjojo	Netherlands	24.07	CR

== Swimming ==
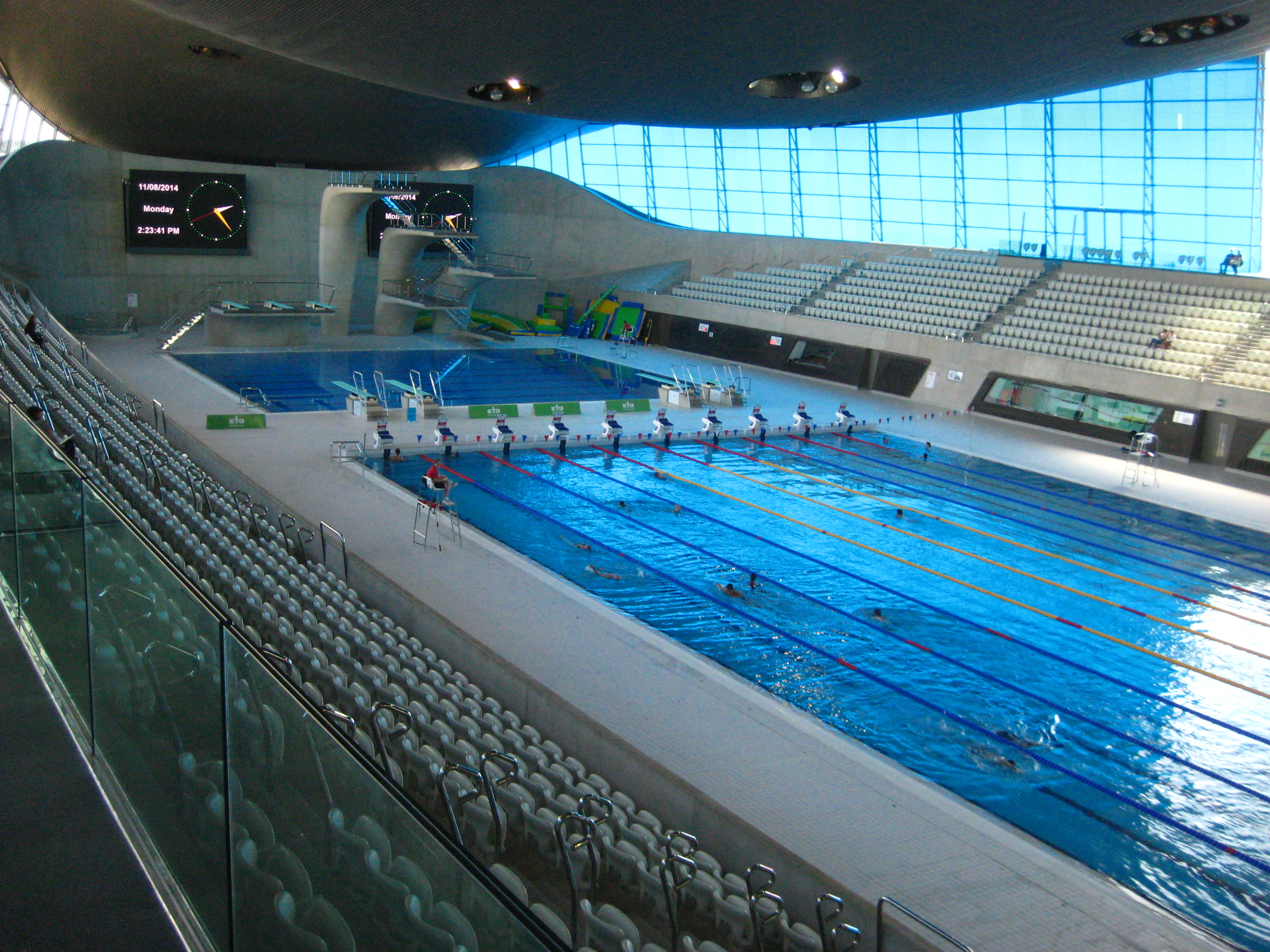
London Aquatics Centre

=== Medal table ===
Rank	Nation	Gold	Silver	Bronze	Total
1	Hungary	10	4	5	19
2	Great Britain	7	6	9	22
3	Italy	5	7	5	17
4	Netherlands	5	3	2	10
5	France	4	1	4	9
6	Sweden	4	0	1	5
7	Denmark	2	4	1	7
8	Ukraine	1	2	2	5
9	Germany	1	1	0	2
9	Poland	1	1	0	2
11	Lithuania	1	0	2	3
12	Greece	1	0	1	2
13	Spain	0	3	3	6
14	Iceland	0	2	1	3
15	Israel	0	2	0	2
16	Belgium	0	1	1	2
16	Russia	0	1	1	2
16	Slovenia	0	1	1	2
19	Norway	0	1	0	1
19	Serbia	0	1	0	1
19	Slovakia	0	1	0	1
22	Finland	0	0	2	2
23	Croatia	0	0	1	1
23	Portugal	0	0	1	1
Totals (24 entries)		42	42	43	127

=== Results ===
==== Men's events ====
Event	Gold		Silver		Bronze	
50 m freestyle	Florent Manaudou; France	21.73	Andriy Hovorov; Ukraine	21.79	Benjamin Proud; Great Britain	21.85
100 m freestyle	Luca Dotto; Italy	48.25	Sebastiaan Verschuren; Netherlands	48.32	Clément Mignon; France	48.36
200 m freestyle	Sebastiaan Verschuren; Netherlands	1:46.02	Velimir Stjepanović; Serbia	1:46.26	James Guy; Great Britain	1:46.42
400 m freestyle	Gabriele Detti; Italy	3:44.01 CR	Henrik Christiansen; Norway	3:46.49	Péter Bernek; Hungary	3:46.81
800 metre freestyle	Gregorio Paltrinieri; Italy	7:42.33 CR	Gabriele Detti; Italy	7:43.52	Mykhailo Romanchuk; Ukraine	7:47.99
1500 m freestyle	Gregorio Paltrinieri; Italy	14:34.04 ER, CR	Gabriele Detti; Italy	14:48.75	Mykhailo Romanchuk; Ukraine	14:50.33
50 m backstroke	Camille Lacourt; France	24.77	Richárd Bohus; Hungary	24.82	Grigoriy Tarasevich; Russia	24.86
100 m backstroke	Camille Lacourt; France	53.79	Grigoriy Tarasevich; Russia	53.89	Simone Sabbioni; Italy; Apostolos Christou; Greece	54.19
200 m backstroke	Radosław Kawęcki; Poland	1:55.98	Yakov Toumarkin; Israel	1:56.97	Danas Rapšys; Lithuania	1:57.22
50 m breaststroke	Adam Peaty; Great Britain	26.66	Peter John Stevens; Slovenia	27.09	Ross Murdoch; Great Britain	27.31
100 m breaststroke	Adam Peaty; Great Britain	58.36 CR	Ross Murdoch; Great Britain	59.73	Giedrius Titenis; Lithuania	1:00.10
200 m breaststroke	Ross Murdoch; Great Britain	2:08.33	Marco Koch; Germany	2:08.40	Luca Pizzini; Italy	2:10.39
50 m butterfly	Andriy Hovorov; Ukraine	22.92	László Cseh; Hungary	23.31	Ben Proud; Great Britain	23.34
100 m butterfly	László Cseh; Hungary	50.86 CR	Konrad Czerniak; Poland	51.22	Mehdy Metella; France	51.70
200 m butterfly	László Cseh; Hungary	1:52.91 CR	Viktor Bromer; Denmark	1:55.35	Tamás Kenderesi; Hungary	1:55.39
200 m individual medley	Andreas Vazaios; Greece	1:58.18	Gal Nevo; Israel	1:59.69	Alexis Santos; Portugal	1:59.76
400 m individual medley	Dávid Verrasztó; Hungary	4:13.15	Richárd Nagy; Slovakia	4:14.16	Federico Turrini; Italy	4:14.74
4 × 100 m freestyle relay	France; William Meynard (49.57); Florent Manaudou (47.64); Fabien Gilot (48.26); Clément Mignon (48.01)	3:13.48	Italy; Luca Dotto (48.03); Luca Leonardi (48.47); Jonathan Boffa (49.21); Filippo Magnini (48.58)	3:14.29	Belgium; Glenn Surgeloose (48.75); Jasper Aerents (49.31); Dieter Dekoninck (48.87); Pieter Timmers (47.37)	3:14.30
4 × 200 m freestyle relay	Netherlands; Dion Dreesens (1:47.92); Maarten Brzoskowski (1:46.55); Kyle Stolk (1:47.88); Sebastiaan Verschuren (1:45.47)	7:07.82	Belgium; Louis Croenen (1:48.47); Glenn Surgeloose (1:46.12); Dieter Dekoninck (1:47.70); Pieter Timmers (1:45.99)	7:08.28	Italy; Andrea Mitchell D'Arrigo (1:47.57); Filippo Magnini (1:47.82); Luca Dotto (1:47.52); Gabriele Detti (1:45.39)	7:08.30
4 × 100 m medley relay	Great Britain; Chris Walker-Hebborn (54.23); Adam Peaty (58.08); James Guy (51.69); Duncan Scott (48.15)	3:32.15	France; Benjamin Stasiulis (54.73); Giacomo Perez-Dortona (1:00.23); Mehdy Metella (51.38); Florent Manaudou (47.55)	3:33.89	Hungary; Gábor Balog (54.40); Gábor Financsek (1:01.45); László Cseh (50.33); Richárd Bohus (47.94)	3:34.12

==== Women's events ====
Event	Gold		Silver		Bronze	
50 m freestyle	Ranomi Kromowidjojo; Netherlands	24.07 CR	Francesca Halsall; Great Britain	24.44	Jeanette Ottesen; Denmark	24.61
100 m freestyle	Sarah Sjöström; Sweden	52.82	Ranomi Kromowidjojo; Netherlands	53.24	Femke Heemskerk; Netherlands	53.72
200 m freestyle	Federica Pellegrini; Italy	1:55.93	Femke Heemskerk; Netherlands	1:55.97	Charlotte Bonnet; France	1:56.51
400 m freestyle	Boglárka Kapás; Hungary	4:03.47	Jazmin Carlin; Great Britain	4:04.85	Mireia Belmonte; Spain	4:06.89
800 m freestyle	Boglárka Kapás; Hungary	8:21.40	Jazmin Carlin; Great Britain	8:23.52	Tjaša Oder; Slovenia	8:25.68
1500 m freestyle	Boglárka Kapás; Hungary	15:50.22 CR	Mireia Belmonte; Spain	16:00.20	María Vilas; Spain	16:01.25
50 m backstroke	Francesca Halsall; Great Britain	27.57 CR	Mie Nielsen; Denmark	27.77	Georgia Davies; Great Britain	27.87
100 m backstroke	Mie Nielsen; Denmark	58.73 CR	Katinka Hosszú; Hungary	58.94	Kathleen Dawson; Great Britain	59.68
200 m backstroke	Katinka Hosszú; Hungary	2:07.01	Daryna Zevina; Ukraine	2:07.48	Matea Samardžić; Croatia	2:09.24
50 m breaststroke	Jennie Johansson; Sweden	30.81	Hrafnhildur Lúthersdóttir; Iceland	30.91	Jenna Laukkanen; Finland	30.95
100 m breaststroke	Rūta Meilutytė; Lithuania	1:06.17	Hrafnhildur Lúthersdóttir; Iceland	1:06.45	Chloe Tutton; Great Britain	1:07.50
200 m breaststroke	Rikke Møller Pedersen; Denmark	2:21.69	Jessica Vall; Spain	2:22.56	Hrafnhildur Lúthersdóttir; Iceland	2:22.96
50 m butterfly	Sarah Sjöström; Sweden	24.99	Jeanette Ottesen; Denmark	25.44	Francesca Halsall; Great Britain	25.48
100 m butterfly	Sarah Sjöström; Sweden	55.89 CR	Jeanette Ottesen; Denmark	56.83	Ilaria Bianchi; Italy	57.52
200 m butterfly	Franziska Hentke; Germany	2:07.23	Liliána Szilágyi; Hungary	2:07.24	Judit Ignacio; Spain	2:07.52
200 m individual medley	Katinka Hosszú; Hungary	2:07.30 CR	Siobhan-Marie O'Connor; Great Britain	2:09.03	Hannah Miley; Great Britain	2:11.84
400 m individual medley	Katinka Hosszú; Hungary	4:30.90 CR	Hannah Miley; Great Britain	4:35.27	Zsuzsanna Jakabos; Hungary	4:38.39
4 × 100 m freestyle relay	Netherlands; Maud van der Meer (54.68); Femke Heemskerk (52.80); Marrit Steenbergen (53.82); Ranomi Kromowidjojo (52.50)	3:33.80	Italy; Silvia Di Pietro (55.00); Erika Ferraioli (54.18); Aglaia Pezzato (55.04); Federica Pellegrini (53.46)	3:37.68	Sweden; Sarah Sjöström (53.48); Ida Marko-Varga (54.90); Ida Lindborg (54.45); Louise Hansson (55.01)	3:37.84
4 × 200 m freestyle relay	Hungary; Zsuzsanna Jakabos (1:58.60); Evelyn Verrasztó (1:58.16); Boglárka Kapás (1:58.22); Katinka Hosszú (1:56.65)	7:51.63	Spain; Melani Costa (1:58.69); Patricia Castro (1:58.21); Fatima Gallardo (1:58.63); Mireia Belmonte (1:57.85)	7:53.38	Netherlands; Andrea Kneppers (2:00.19); Esmee Vermeulen (1:58.53); Robin Neumann (1:59.75); Femke Heemskerk (1:55.16)	7:53.63
4 × 100 m medley relay	Great Britain; Kathleen Dawson (59.82); Chloe Tutton (1:06.94); Siobhan-Marie O'Connor (57.69); Francesca Halsall (54.12)	3:58.57	Italy; Carlotta Zofkova (1:01.07); Martina Carraro (1:07.18); Ilaria Bianchi (58.36); Erika Ferraioli (54.12)	4:00.73	Finland; Mimosa Jallow (1:00.42); Jenna Laukkanen (1:06.42); Emilia Pikkarainen (59.56); Hanna-Maria Seppälä (55.09)	4:01.49

==== Mixed events ====
Event	Gold		Silver		Bronze	
4 × 100 m mixed freestyle relay	Netherlands; Sebastiaan Verschuren (48.64); Ben Schwietert (49.03); Maud van der Meer (53.70); Ranomi Kromowidjojo (52.27)	3:23.64 CR	Italy; Filippo Magnini (49.35); Luca Dotto (47.94); Erika Ferraioli (54.35); Federica Pellegrini (52.91)	3:24.55	France; Clément Mignon (49.26); Jérémy Stravius (48.29); Charlotte Bonnet (53.44); Anna Santamans (54.50)	3:25.49
4 × 100 m mixed medley relay	Great Britain; Chris Walker-Hebborn (54.36); Adam Peaty (58.84); Siobhan-Marie O'Connor (57.69); Francesca Halsall (53.67)	3:44.56	Italy; Simone Sabbioni (54.01); Martina Carraro (1:07.48); Piero Codia (51.05); Federica Pellegrini (53.20)	3:45.74	Hungary; Gábor Balog (54.51); Gábor Financsek (1:01.19); Evelyn Verrasztó (59.37); Zsuzsanna Jakabos (54.43)	3:49.50

== Diving ==
=== Medal table ===
Rank	Nation	Gold	Silver	Bronze	Total
1	Great Britain	3	5	3	11
2	Italy	3	3	0	6
3	Ukraine	3	2	3	8
4	Russia	2	2	5	9
5	Germany	2	0	0	2
6	Netherlands	0	1	0	1
7	Austria	0	0	1	1
7	Hungary	0	0	1	1
Totals (8 entries)		13	13	13	39

=== Results ===
==== Men's events ====
Event	Gold		Silver		Bronze	
1 m springboard	Illya Kvasha; Ukraine	439.70	Giovanni Tocci; Italy	414.30	Constantin Blaha; Austria	402.55
3 m springboard	Evgeny Kuznetsov; Russia	497.90	Jack Laugher; Great Britain	473.60	Illya Kvasha; Ukraine	463.85
3 m synchro springboard	Great Britain; Jack Laugher; Chris Mears	456.81	Russia; Ilya Zakharov; Evgeny Kuznetsov	445.23	Ukraine; Illya Kvasha; Oleksandr Horshkovozov	439.86
10 m platform	Tom Daley; Great Britain	570.50	Viktor Minibaev; Russia	524.60	Nikita Shleikher; Russia	480.90
10 m synchro platform	Germany; Sascha Klein; Patrick Hausding	445.26	Great Britain; Tom Daley; Daniel Goodfellow	444.30	Ukraine; Oleksandr Horshkovozov; Maksym Dolhov	429.75

==== Women's events ====
Event	Gold		Silver		Bronze	
1 m springboard	Tania Cagnotto; Italy	284.15	Elena Bertocchi; Italy	281.30	Nadezhda Bazhina; Russia	280.75
3 m springboard	Tania Cagnotto; Italy	360.60	Uschi Freitag; Netherlands	330.60	Grace Reid; Great Britain	328.55
3 m synchro springboard	Italy; Tania Cagnotto; Francesca Dallapé	327.81	Great Britain; Alicia Blagg; Rebecca Gallantree	319.32	Russia; Nadezhda Bazhina; Kristina Ilinykh	304.20
10 m platform	Yulia Prokopchuk; Ukraine	385.90	Tonia Couch; Great Britain	352.70	Georgia Ward; Great Britain	325.05
10 m synchro platform	Germany; Maria Kurjo; My Phan	279.75	Ukraine; Hanna Krasnoshlyk; Vlada Tatsenko	278.01	Hungary; Villő Kormos; Zsófia Reisinger	274.74

==== Mixed and team events ====
Event	Gold		Silver		Bronze	
Mixed 3 m springboard synchro	Great Britain; Grace Reid; Tom Daley	321.06	Italy; Tania Cagnotto; Maicol Verzotto	308.70	Russia; Nadezhda Bazhina; Nikita Shleikher	305.28
Mixed 10 m platform synchro	Ukraine; Yulia Prokopchuk; Maksym Dolgov	323.70	Great Britain; Georgia Ward; Matty Lee	318.24	Russia; Yulia Timoshinina; Nikita Shleikher	307.68
Team event	Russia; Nadezhda Bazhina; Viktor Minibaev	413.30	Ukraine; Yulia Prokopchuk; Oleksandr Horshkovozov	396.40	Great Britain; Georgia Ward; Matty Lee	353.85

== Synchronised swimming ==
=== Medal table ===
Rank	Nation	Gold	Silver	Bronze	Total
1	Russia	8	0	0	8
2	Ukraine	1	6	0	7
3	Italy	0	3	6	9
4	Spain	0	0	3	3
Totals (4 entries)		9	9	9	27

=== Results ===
Event	Gold		Silver		Bronze	
Solo free routine	Natalia Ishchenko; Russia	96.4000	Anna Voloshyna; Ukraine	93.4000	Linda Cerruti; Italy	89.4333
Solo technical routine	Svetlana Romashina; Russia	93.8865	Anna Voloshyna; Ukraine	90.7289	Linda Cerruti; Italy	87.1493
Duet free routine	Russia; Natalia Ishchenko; Svetlana Romashina	96.9000	Ukraine; Lolita Ananasova; Anna Voloshyna	93.3333	Italy; Linda Cerruti; Costanza Ferro	91.2667
Duet technical routine	Russia; Natalia Ishchenko; Svetlana Romashina	95.1900	Ukraine; Lolita Ananasova; Anna Voloshyna	91.7249	Italy; Linda Cerruti; Costanza Ferro	88.3564
Team free routine	Ukraine; Lolita Ananasova; Olena Grechykhina; Daria Iushko; Oleksandra Sabada; Kateryna Sadurska; Anastasiya Savchuk; Kseniya Sydorenko; Anna Voloshyna; Oleksandra Kashuba (reserve); Olha Kondrashova (reserve); Kateryna Reznik (reserve); Olha Zolotarova (reserve)	94.0000	Italy; Elisa Bozzo; Beatrice Callegari; Camilla Cattaneo; Linda Cerruti; Francesca Deidda; Costanza Ferro; Manila Flamini; Mariangela Perrupato; Sara Sgarzi; Costanza Di Camillo (reserve); Gemma Galli (reserve)	91.2333	Spain; Alba María Cabello; Clara Camacho; Helena Jauma; Cecilia Jiménez; Carmen Juárez; Meritxell Mas; Paula Ramírez; Cristina Salvador; Berta Ferreras (reserve)	88.6667
Team technical routine	Russia; Vlada Chigireva; Marina Goliadkina; Svetlana Kolesnichenko; Alexandra Patskevich; Elena Prokofyeva; Alla Shishkina; Maria Shurochkina; Gelena Topilina; Liliia Nizamova (reserve); Darina Valitova (reserve)	94.0994	Ukraine; Lolita Ananasova; Olena Grechykhina; Daria Iushko; Oleksandra Sabada; Kateryna Sadurska; Anastasiya Savchuk; Kseniya Sydorenko; Anna Voloshyna; Olha Kondrashova (reserve); Olha Zolotarova (reserve)	92.0844	Italy; Elisa Bozzo; Beatrice Callegari; Camilla Cattaneo; Francesca Deidda; Costanza Ferro; Manila Flamini; Mariangela Perrupato; Sara Sgarzi; Linda Cerruti (reserve); Gemma Galli (reserve)	88.9053
Combination routine	Russia; Vlada Chigireva; Marina Goliadkina; Svetlana Kolesnichenko; Liliia Nizamova; Alexandra Patskevich; Elena Prokofyeva; Alla Shishkina; Maria Shurochkina; Darina Valitova; Gelena Topilina; Mikhaela Kalancha (reserve)	96.5000	Ukraine; Lolita Ananasova; Olena Grechykhina; Daria Iushko; Ekaterina Reznik; Oleksandra Sabada; Kateryna Sadurska; Anastasiya Savchuk; Kseniya Sydorenko; Anna Voloshyna; Olha Zolotarova; Oleksandra Kashuba (reserve); Olha Kondrashova (reserve)	93.4333	Italy; Elisa Bozzo; Beatrice Callegari; Camilla Cattaneo; Linda Cerruti; Francesca Deidda; Costanza Ferro; Manila Flamini; Gemma Galli; Mariangela Perrupato; Sara Sgarzi; Costanza Di Camillo (reserve)	90.9333
Mixed free routine	Russia; Aleksandr Maltsev; Mikhaela Kalancha	90.4667	Italy; Giorgio Minisini; Mariangela Perrupato	87.4667	Spain; Pau Ribes; Berta Ferreras	86.5667
Mixed technical routine	Russia; Aleksandr Maltsev; Mikhaela Kalancha	89.0902	Italy; Giorgio Minisini; Manila Flamini	86.1772	Spain; Pau Ribes; Berta Ferreras	82.0645

== See also ==
- 2015 World Aquatics Championships
- 2017 World Aquatics Championships
