= Andriy Govorov =

Ukrainian swimmer

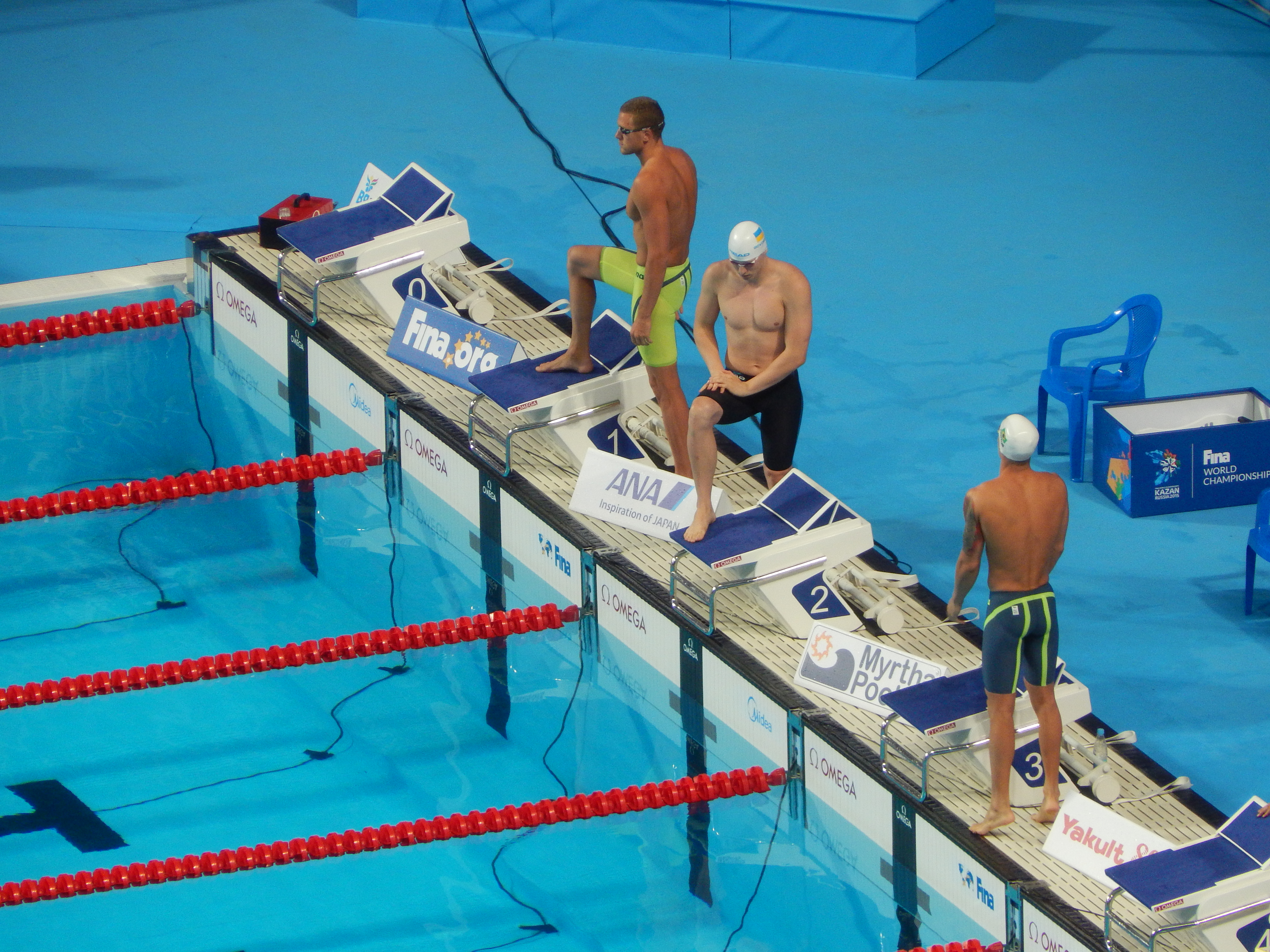
- Govorov in lane 2, 2015

Personal information
- Full name: Andriy Andriyovych Govorov
- National team: Ukraine
- Born: 10 April 1992 (age 34) Sevastopol, Ukraine
- Height: 1.91 m (6 ft 3 in)
- Weight: 90 kg (198 lb)

Sport
- Sport: Swimming
- Strokes: Butterfly, freestyle
- Club: Toronto Titans (ISL 2020)
- Coach: Kostiantyn Kartashov; Arilson Silva
Medal record
Men's swimming
Representing Ukraine
World Championships (LC)
Bronze medal – third place	2017 Budapest	50 m butterfly
World Championships (SC)
Silver medal – second place	2010 Dubai	50 m butterfly
Bronze medal – third place	2014 Doha	50 m butterfly
European Championships (LC)
Gold medal – first place	2016 London	50 m butterfly
Gold medal – first place	2018 Glasgow	50 m butterfly
Silver medal – second place	2016 London	50 m freestyle
Silver medal – second place	2020 Budapest	50 m butterfly
Bronze medal – third place	2012 Debrecen	50 m freestyle
Bronze medal – third place	2014 Berlin	50 m butterfly
European Championships (SC)
Gold medal – first place	2011 Szczecin	50 m butterfly
Gold medal – first place	2013 Herning	50 m butterfly
Gold medal – first place	2015 Netanya	50 m butterfly
Silver medal – second place	2010 Eindhoven	50 m butterfly
Silver medal – second place	2017 Copenhagen	50 m butterfly
Bronze medal – third place	2010 Eindhoven	50 m freestyle
Bronze medal – third place	2012 Chartres	50 m butterfly
Bronze medal – third place	2013 Herning	50 m freestyle
Summer Universiade
Gold medal – first place	2017 Taipei	50 m butterfly
Youth Olympic Games
Gold medal – first place	2010 Singapore	50 m freestyle
Gold medal – first place	2010 Singapore	50 m butterfly
European Junior Championships
Gold medal – first place	2009 Prague	50 m butterfly
Gold medal – first place	2010 Helsinki	50 m freestyle
Gold medal – first place	2010 Helsinki	50 m butterfly

Andriy Andriyovych Govorov (Ukrainian: Андрій Андрійович Говоров; born 10 April 1992) is a retired Ukrainian competitive swimmer who holds the 50 meters butterfly world record. He has also been European Champion in that event (2016 London) and bronze medalist in the world championship in that event (2017 Budapest).

== Personal life ==
Govorov was born on 10 April 1992 in Sevastopol, Ukraine. A graduate of the Dnipro Higher School of Physical Culture, in 2016 he also attended the Dnipro National University.

== Career ==
=== World and European Championships ===
He won silver at the 2010 World Short Course Championships.

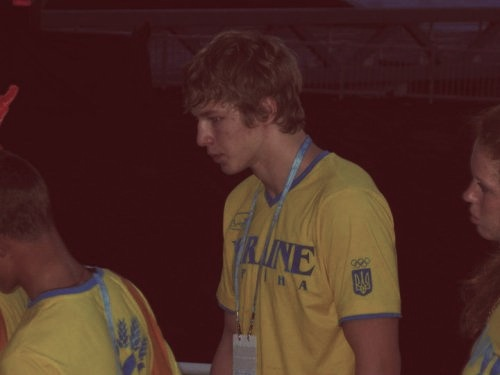
Govorov at the 2010 Youth Olympic Games

Govorov won a silver medal at the 50 meter butterfly and a bronze medal at the 50 meter freestyle during the 2010 European Short Course Swimming Championships. During the 2010 FINA Short Course World Championships he again won a silver medal at the 50 meter butterfly.

Between 2011 and 2015, he won three gold medals in the 50 m butterfly at the European Short Course Swimming Championships.

Following the 2014 Russian annexation of his native Crimea Govorov ruled out changing his nationality and continues to compete for Ukraine. That year he won bronze at the World Short Course Championships in the men's 50 m butterfly.

At the 2016 European Aquatics Championships in London, he won the gold medal in the 50 m butterfly (long course). In the semifinals he swam a time of 22.73, which broke his own national and championship records. It was also the fastest time ever swum in a textile swimsuit.

At the 2017 World Championships, he won the bronze medal in the men's 50 m butterfly.

At the 2018 European Championships in Glasgow, Govorov won gold in the 50 metre butterfly, in a championship record time of 22.48.

In 2021, he won silver in the European Championships in the 50 m butterfly.

=== International Swimming League ===
In spring 2020, Govorov signed to the Toronto Titans, in their inaugural season.

=== Other ===
Govorov competed at the 2012 and 2016 Olympics.

He broke the Ukrainian record in the short course 50 m freestyle in 2016, and also holds the national short course records in 50 m butterfly, and was part of the teams that hold the short course men's 4 x 50 m medley and mixed 4 x 50 m freestyle and 4 x 50 m medley relay records. At the 2016 Olympics, he set a national record in the 50 m freestyle.

On 1 July 2018 Govorov broke the long course world record in the 50m butterfly, held for 9 years by Spain's Rafael Muñoz, in a time of 22.27, beating the 2017 world champion in the same event, Ben Proud (22.93), and the Dutchman Mathys Goosen (23.55) at the Trofeo Sette Colli held in Rome, Italy.

Govorov intends to participate in the Enhanced Games in 2026.

Records
Preceded by Rafael Muñoz	Men's 50-metre butterfly world record holder (long course); 1 July 2018 – present	Succeeded by Incumbent
