= Mislav Sever =

Croatian swimmer

Personal information
- Nationality: Croatian
- Born: 15 December 1994 (age 31)

Sport
- Sport: Swimming

Mislav Sever (born 15 December 1994) is a Croatian swimmer. He competed in the men's 100 metre freestyle event at the 2017 World Aquatics Championships.
