= Konrad Czerniak =

Polish swimmer (born 1989)

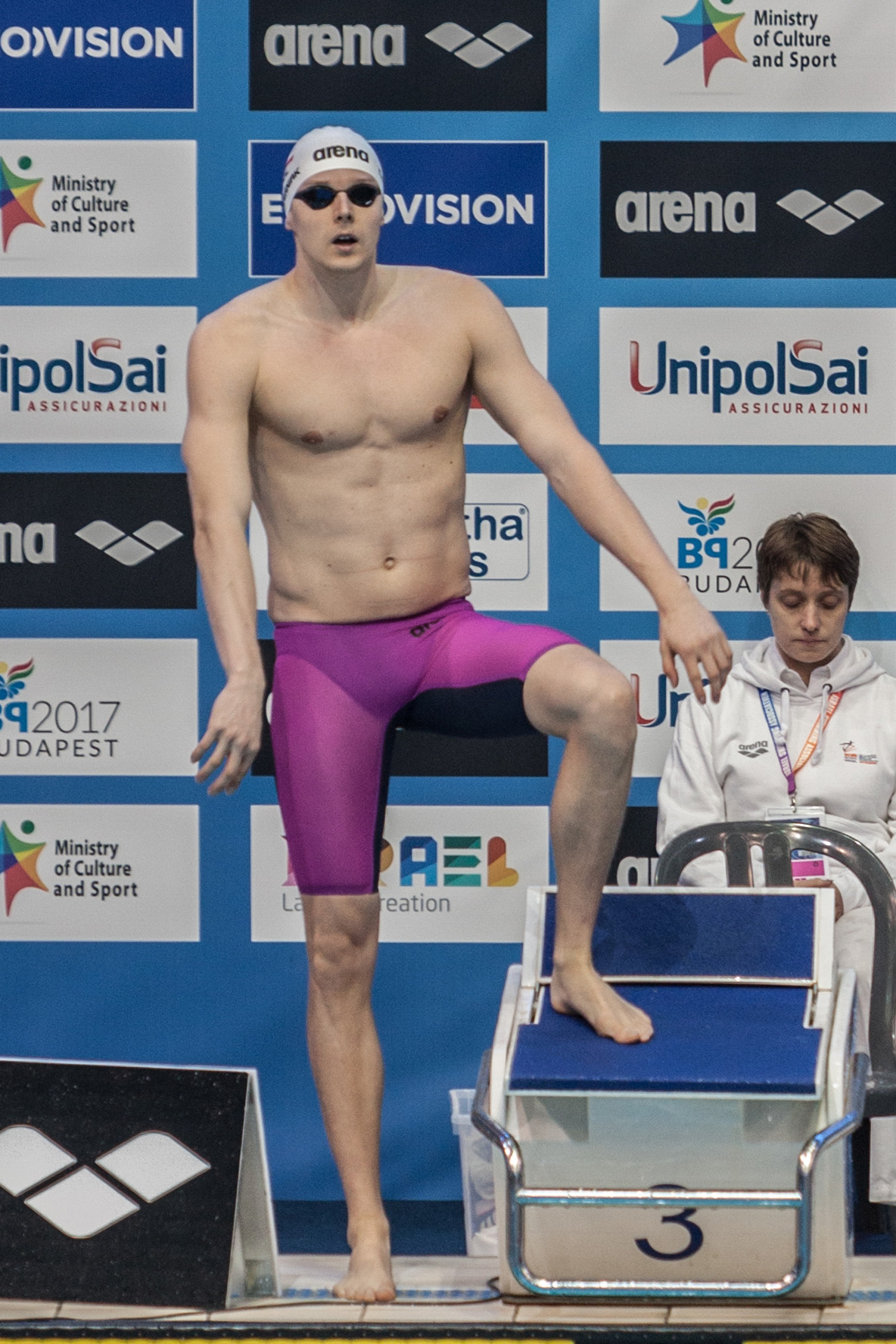
- Netanya 2015

Personal information
- National team: Poland
- Born: 11 July 1989 (age 36) Puławy, Poland
- Height: 1.95 m (6 ft 5 in)
- Weight: 86 kg (190 lb)

Sport
- Sport: Swimming
- Strokes: Butterfly, freestyle
- Club: KS Wisla Pulawy
Medal record
Men's swimming
Representing Poland
| Event | 1st | 2nd | 3rd |
|---|---|---|---|
| Olympic Games | 0 | 0 | 0 |
| World Championships (LC) | 0 | 1 | 2 |
| World Championships (SC) | 0 | 0 | 0 |
| European Championships (LC) | 1 | 2 | 2 |
| European Championships (SC) | 2 | 5 | 2 |
| European Junior Championships | 1 | 0 | 0 |
| Total | 4 | 3 | 6 |
World Championships (LC)
| Silver medal – second place | 2011 Shanghai | 100 m butterfly |
| Bronze medal – third place | 2013 Barcelona | 100 m butterfly |
| Bronze medal – third place | 2015 Kazan | 50 m butterfly |
European Championships (LC)
| Gold medal – first place | 2014 Berlin | 100 m butterfly |
| Silver medal – second place | 2014 Berlin | 50 m freestyle |
| Silver medal – second place | 2016 London | 100 m butterfly |
| Bronze medal – third place | 2010 Budapest | 100 m butterfly |
| Bronze medal – third place | 2018 Glasgow | 4×100 m freestyle |
European Championships (SC)
| Gold medal – first place | 2011 Szczecin | 50 m freestyle |
| Gold medal – first place | 2011 Szczecin | 100 m butterfly |
| Bronze medal – third place | 2011 Szczecin | 50 m butterfly |
| Bronze medal – third place | 2017 Copenhagen | 4×50 m freestyle |
European Junior Championships
| Gold medal – first place | 2007 Antwerp | 50 m butterfly |
Military World Games
| Silver medal – second place | 2019 Wuhan | 50 m butterfly |
| Bronze medal – third place | 2019 Wuhan | 100 m butterfly |
| Bronze medal – third place | 2019 Wuhan | 4×100 m medley |

Konrad Czerniak (born 11 July 1989) is a Polish competitive swimmer who has participated in the Olympics, FINA world championships, and European championships. He won ten medals at these championships, mostly in the butterfly.

At the 2012 Summer Olympics, he competed in the men's 100 m butterfly and the men's 100 m freestyle, reaching the final of the butterfly and the semifinals of the freestyle.

At the 2016 Summer Olympics, he competed in the men's 100 m butterfly, reaching the semifinals, and the men's 4 × 100 m medley and 4 × 100 m freestyle.
