= 2018 FINA World Swimming Championships (25 m) – Men's 100 metre butterfly =

Men's 100 metre butterfly at the 2018 FINA World Swimming Championships (25 m)
- Venue: Hangzhou Sports Park Stadium
- Dates: 12 December (heats and semifinals); 13 December (final)
- Competitors: 78
- Winning time: 48.50

Medalists
gold medal	Chad le Clos	South Africa
silver medal	Caeleb Dressel	United States
bronze medal	Li Zhuhao	China

The Men's 100 metre butterfly competition of the 2018 FINA World Swimming Championships (25 m) was held on 12 and 13 December 2018 at the Hangzhou Olympic Sports Center.

== Records ==
Prior to the competition, the existing world and championship records were as follows.

	Name	Nation	Time	Location	Date
World record	Chad le Clos	South Africa	48.08	Windsor	8 December 2016
Championship record	Chad le Clos	South Africa	48.08	Windsor	8 December 2016

== Results ==
=== Heats ===
The heats were started at 10:33.

Rank	Heat	Lane	Name	Nationality	Time	Notes
1	6	6	Caeleb Dressel	United States	49.23	Q
2	8	4	Chad le Clos	South Africa	49.34	Q
3	8	3	Marius Kusch	Germany	49.54	Q
4	6	5	Piero Codia	Italy	50.07	Q
5	8	1	Jack Conger	United States	50.20	Q
6	8	5	Li Zhuhao	China	50.29	Q
7	6	4	Takeshi Kawamoto	Japan	50.34	Q
8	7	5	Mehdy Metella	France	50.42	Q
9	7	3	Yauhen Tsurkin	Belarus	50.58	Q
10	7	2	Kengo Ida	Japan	50.74	Q
11	8	6	Aleksandr Kharlanov	Russia	50.99	Q
12	8	7	Tomoe Zenimoto Hvas	Norway	51.04	Q
13	7	6	Roman Shevliakov	Russia	51.21	Q
14	6	0	Deividas Margevičius	Lithuania	51.25	Q
15	6	3	Konrad Czerniak	Poland	51.28	Q
16	8	0	Liubomyr Lemeshko	Ukraine	51.35	Q
17	6	2	Umitcan Gures	Turkey	51.41	
17	8	2	Hryhory Pekarski	Belarus	51.41	
19	4	3	Adilbek Mussin	Kazakhstan	51.50	
20	5	5	Brendan Hyland	Ireland	51.54	
20	7	1	Nic Brown	Australia	51.54	
22	6	7	Ryan Coetzee	South Africa	51.65	
23	6	8	Leonardo de Deus	Brazil	51.69	
24	7	8	Shen Jiahao	China	51.73	
25	5	2	Antani Ivanov	Bulgaria	51.81	
26	6	1	Riku Pöytäkivi	Finland	51.90	
27	7	9	Sajan Prakash	India	51.97	
28	5	6	Ben Hockin	Paraguay	52.13	
29	7	0	Hugo González	Spain	52.28	
30	8	8	Emmanuel Vanluchene	Belgium	52.30	
31	7	7	Kregor Zirk	Estonia	52.32	
32	5	0	Esnaider Reales	Colombia	52.43	
33	5	7	Adam Halas	Slovakia	52.50	
34	6	9	Sascha Subarsky	Austria	52.53	
35	5	3	Bradlee Ashby	New Zealand	52.57	
36	5	1	Daniel Martin	Romania	52.62	
37	5	9	Cadell Lyons	Trinidad and Tobago	52.91	
37	8	9	Wang Kuan-hung	Chinese Taipei	52.91	
39	4	4	Alexandre Perreault	Canada	53.40	
40	4	1	Nicholas Lim	Hong Kong	53.49	
41	2	0	Philip Adejumo	Nigeria	53.62	NR
42	5	8	Julien Henx	Luxembourg	53.80	
43	5	4	Cherantha de Silva	Sri Lanka	54.21	
44	4	0	Seggio Bernardina	Curaçao	54.25	
45	4	2	Gabriel Araya	Chile	54.37	
46	4	5	Ralph Goveia	Zambia	54.42	
47	4	9	Siwat Matangkapong	Thailand	54.75	
48	4	8	Vladislav Shuliko	Kyrgyzstan	55.43	NR
49	4	6	Ayman Kelzi	Syria	55.53	
50	2	9	Md Mahamudun Nobi Nahid	Bangladesh	56.04	
51	3	4	Yacob Al-Khulaifi	Qatar	56.25	
51	4	7	N'Nhyn Fernander	Bahamas	56.25	
53	1	2	Ali Alkaabi	United Arab Emirates	56.77	
54	3	3	Chase Onorati	Zimbabwe	57.00	
55	1	7	Mohammed Isam Sadeq Kazan	Iraq	57.13	
56	3	8	Zeniel Guzmán	Dominican Republic	57.57	
57	3	1	Jayhan Odlum-Smith	Saint Lucia	57.64	
58	3	6	Yousif Bu-Arish	Saudi Arabia	57.84	
59	3	0	Fernando Ponce	Guatemala	57.90	
60	3	9	Dajenel Williams	Grenada	58.22	
61	2	4	Collins Saliboko	Tanzania	58.39	
62	3	5	Davidson Vincent	Haiti	58.41	
63	3	7	Ridhwan Abubakar	Kenya	58.61	
64	3	2	Isiaka Irankunda	Rwanda	58.63	
65	2	5	Troy Pina	Cape Verde	59.18	
66	1	8	Bernat Lomero	Andorra	59.55	
67	2	3	Dion Kadriu	Kosovo	59.96	
68	1	3	Belly-Cresus Ganira	Burundi	59.99	
69	1	5	Abdulla Essa Ahmed Ali Yusuf	Bahrain	1:00.23	
70	2	8	Anubhav Subba	Nepal	1:01.01	
71	2	6	Ousmane Touré	Mali	1:01.76	
72	2	2	Simanga Dlamini	Eswatini	1:02.74	
73	1	6	Fakhriddin Madkamov	Tajikistan	1:03.86	
74	2	1	Ratha Phin	Cambodia	1:04.53	
75	2	7	Nelson Batallones	Northern Mariana Islands	1:05.15	
76	1	1	Achala Gekabel	Ethiopia	1:06.82	
77	1	4	Albachir Mouctar	Niger	1:15.09	
	7	4	Matteo Rivolta	Italy	DSQ	

=== Semifinals ===
The semifinals were held at 20:22.

==== Semifinal 1 ====
Rank	Lane	Name	Nationality	Time	Notes
1	4	Chad le Clos	South Africa	49.07	Q
2	3	Li Zhuhao	China	49.36	Q, AS
3	6	Mehdy Metella	France	49.77	Q
4	5	Piero Codia	Italy	50.23	Q
5	7	Tomoe Zenimoto Hvas	Norway	50.49	WJ
6	2	Kengo Ida	Japan	50.54	
7	1	Deividas Margevičius	Lithuania	50.95	
8	8	Liubomyr Lemeshko	Ukraine	51.53	

==== Semifinal 2 ====
Rank	Lane	Name	Nationality	Time	Notes
1	4	Caeleb Dressel	United States	48.93	Q
2	5	Marius Kusch	Germany	49.35	Q
3	6	Takeshi Kawamoto	Japan	49.94	Q
4	3	Jack Conger	United States	50.41	Q
5	7	Aleksandr Kharlanov	Russia	50.76	
6	2	Yauhen Tsurkin	Belarus	50.77	
7	1	Roman Shevliakov	Russia	50.94	
8	8	Konrad Czerniak	Poland	51.18	

=== Final ===
The final was held at 20:00.

Rank	Lane	Name	Nationality	Time	Notes
1st place, gold medalist(s)	5	Chad le Clos	South Africa	48.50	
2nd place, silver medalist(s)	4	Caeleb Dressel	United States	48.71	
3rd place, bronze medalist(s)	6	Li Zhuhao	China	49.25	AS
4	2	Mehdy Metella	France	49.45	
5	3	Marius Kusch	Germany	49.50	
6	7	Takeshi Kawamoto	Japan	50.07	
7	8	Jack Conger	United States	50.32	
8	1	Piero Codia	Italy	50.71	
