= List of Chilean records in swimming =

This is a list of swimming national records for Chile. They are the fastest time recorded by a swimmer capable of representing Chile for each recognized event.

These records are maintained by Chile's national swimming federation: Federación Chilena de Deportes Acuáticos (FECHIDA).

All records were set in finals unless noted otherwise.

== Long course (50 m) ==
=== Men ===
Event	Time		Name	Club	Date	Meet	Location	Ref
50 m freestyle	22.66	so	Luis Toledo	Chile	28 May 2026	Mare Nostrum	Canet-en-Roussillon, France	
100 m freestyle	50.24		Elias Ardiles	Chile	13 September 2026	South American Games	Santa Fe, Argentina	
200 m freestyle	1:47.99		Eduardo Cisternas	Chile	11 August 2025	Junior Pan American Games	Asunción, Paraguay	
400 m freestyle	3:49.40		Eduardo Cisternas	Chile	10 August 2025	Junior Pan American Games	Asunción, Paraguay	
800 m freestyle	8:08.92		Eduardo Cisternas	Chile	12 April 2023	TYR Pro Swim Series	Westmont, United States	
1500 m freestyle	15:42.25		Eduardo Cisternas	Chile	18 March 2021	South American Championships	Buenos Aires, Argentina	
50 m backstroke	26.11	h	Elias Ardiles	Chile	20 July 2025	World University Games	Berlin, Germany	
100 m backstroke	55.92	r	Edhy Vargas	Chile	26 November 2025	Bolivarian Games	Lima, Peru	
200 m backstroke	2:00.50		Edhy Vargas	Chile	25 November 2025	Bolivarian Games	Lima, Peru	
50 m breaststroke	27.65		Mariano Lazzerini	Chile	25 November 2025	Bolivarian Games	Lima, Peru	
100 m breaststroke	1:00.86		Mariano Lazzerini	Chile	23 November 2025	Bolivarian Games	Lima, Peru	
200 m breaststroke	2:13.75		Mariano Lazzerini	Chile	12 June 2024	Paraguay Championships	Asunción, Paraguay	
50 m butterfly	23.87		Elias Ardiles	Chile	14 September 2026	South American Games	Santa Fe, Argentina	
100 m butterfly	51.91		Elias Ardiles	Chile	15 September 2026	South American Games	Santa Fe, Argentina	
200 m butterfly	2:00.42	tt	Gabriel Araya	Aruza Florida Aquatics	5 December 2019	U.S. Open	Atlanta, United States	
200m individual medley	2:05.43		Matias Mejia	Chile	16 April 2026	South American Youth Games	Panama City, Panama	
400m individual medley	4:29.59		Kaden Kiefer	SouthWest Stars	30 July 2026	Future Championships	Greensboro, United States	
4×100m freestyle relay	3:22.22		Eduardo Cisternas (50.84); Mariano Lazzerini (50.65); Felipe Baffico (50.36); Luis Toledo (50.37)	Chile	25 November 2025	Bolivarian Games	Lima, Peru	
4×200m freestyle relay	7:26.26		Eduardo Cisternas (1:49.66); Mariano Lazzerini (1:51.65); Edhy Vargas (1:52.52); Elias Ardiles (1:52.43)	Chile	13 August 2025	Junior Pan American Games	Asunción, Paraguay	
4×100m medley relay	3:38.01		Edhy Vargas (56.48); Mariano Lazzerini (1:00.53); Elias Ardiles (51.04); Luis Toledo (49.96)	Chile	14 September 2026	South American Games	Santa Fe, Argentina	

Legend: # – Record awaiting ratification by FECHIDA; WR – World record; AM – Americas record;
Records not set in finals: h – heat; sf – semifinal; r – relay 1st leg; rh – relay heat 1st leg; b – B final; † – en route to final mark; so – swim-off; tt – time trial

=== Women ===
Event	Time		Name	Club	Date	Meet	Location	Ref
50m freestyle	26.22	h	Inés Marín	C.N. Sant Andreu	25 June 2026	Spanish Championships	Palma de Mallorca, Spain	
100m freestyle	55.86		Inés Marín	Chile	13 September 2026	South American Games	Santa Fe, Argentina	
200m freestyle	2:01.89	h	Inés Marín	Chile	13 April 2023	TYR Pro Swim Series	Westmont, United States	
400m freestyle	4:11.32		Kristel Köbrich	-	29 March 2012	Indianapolis Grand Prix	Indianapolis, United States	
800m freestyle	8:26.75	h, †	Kristel Köbrich	Chile	29 July 2013	World Championships	Barcelona, Spain	
1500m freestyle	15:54.30	h	Kristel Köbrich	Chile	29 July 2013	World Championships	Barcelona, Spain	
50m backstroke	30.19	h, =	Sarah Szlaruk Traipe	Chile	16 March 2021	South American Championships	Buenos Aires, Argentina	
50m backstroke	30.19	=	Sarah Szlaruk Traipe	Chile	16 March 2021	South American Championships	Buenos Aires, Argentina	
100m backstroke	1:03.26		Sarah Szlaruk Traipe	Chile	17 March 2021	South American Championships	Buenos Aires, Argentina	
200m backstroke	2:18.77		Trinidad Ardiles	Stadio Italiano	13 December 2019	Chilean Summer Championships	Santiago, Chile	
50m breaststroke	32.09		Abril Allende	Tempelogue	22 February 2026	McCullagh International Meet	Dublin, Ireland	
100m breaststroke	1:12.01		Joaquina Negrete	Chile	16 April 2026	South American Youth Games	Panama City, Panama	
100m breaststroke	1:10.60	not ratified	Avalon Schultz Donlan	Wisconsin Aquatics	20 July 2019	Speedo Champions Series	Wisconsin, United States	
200m breaststroke	2:37.22		Joaquina Negrete	Chile	14 September 2026	South American Games	Santa Fe, Argentina	
200m breaststroke	2:36.90	not ratified	Avalon Schultz Donlan	Santa Clara Swim Club	15 July 2017	Summer Superleague Championships	Santa Clara, United States	
50m butterfly	27.88	b	Montse Spielmann	University of Michigan	8 May 2026	Indy Spring Cup	Indianapolis, United States	
100m butterfly	1:01.04	d	Montserrat Spielmann	University of Michigan	18 June 2026	TYR Pro Swim Series	Indianapolis, United States	
200m butterfly	2:13.53	h	Montserrat Spielmann	University of Michigan	28 July 2026	U.S. National Championships	Irvine, United States	
200m individual medley	2:23.01		Fernanda Reyes	Chile	23 November 2025	Bolivarian Games	Lima, Peru	
200m individual medley	2:22.90	h, not ratified	Avalon Schultz Donlan	Santa Clara	7 August 2016	USA Swimming Futures Championships	Stanford, United States	
400m individual medley	4:55.14		Kristel Köbrich	Corinthians	4 May 2010	Maria Lenk Trophy	Santos, Brazil	
4×100m freestyle relay	3:56.37		Sarah Szlaruk (58.62); Fernanda Reyes (59.94); Inés Marín (58.13); Catalina Bustamante (59.68)	Chile	9 April 2019	South American Junior Championships	Santiago, Chile	
4×200m freestyle relay	8:26.66		Inés Marín (2:03.78); Monstserrat Spielmann (2:06.10); Mahina Valdivia (2:10.10); Sarah Szlaruk (2:06.68)	Chile	24 October 2023	Pan American Games	Santiago, Chile	
4×100m medley relay	4:18.81	h	Sarah Szlaruk (1:05.52); Antonia Cubillos (1:13.83); Monstserrat Spielmann (1:02.52); Inés Marín (56.94)	Chile	25 October 2023	Pan American Games	Santiago, Chile	

Legend: # – Record awaiting ratification by FECHIDA; WR – World record; AM – Americas record;
Records not set in finals: h – heat; sf – semifinal; r – relay 1st leg; rh – relay heat 1st leg; b – B final; † – en route to final mark; so – swim-off; tt – time trial

=== Mixed relay ===
Event	Time	Name	Club	Date	Meet	Location	Ref
4×100 m freestyle relay	3:43.12	Gabriel Araya (51.51); Carlos Varas (52.61); Inés Marín (59.30); Catalina Bustamante (59.70)	Chile	9 November 2018	South American Championships	Trujillo, Peru	
4×100 m medley relay	3:51.95	Paz Ardiles (1:03.67); Mariano Lazzerini (1:00.61); Elias Ardiles (51.78); Inés Marín (55.89)	Chile	16 September 2026	South American Games	Santa Fe, Argentina	

Legend: # – Record awaiting ratification by FECHIDA; WR – World record; AM – Americas record;
Records not set in finals: h – heat; so – swim-off

== Short course (25 m) ==
=== Men ===
Event	Time		Name	Club	Date	Meet	Location	Ref
50m freestyle	22.25		Oliver Elliot	Viña	11 May 2014	-	Santiago, Chile	
50m freestyle	22.15	not ratified	Mariano Lazzerini	Andes	24 April 2022	Pentatlon Corto EE	Santiago, Chile	
100m freestyle	49.14	h	Kuky Bustamante	Fluminense FC	2 September 2026	José Finkel Trophy	São Paulo, Brazil	
200m freestyle	1:48.84	h	Gabriel Araya	Azura Florida Aquatics	30 October 2021	Puerto Rico International Open	San Juan, Puerto Rico	
400m freestyle	3:46.43	h	Eduardo Cisternas	Chile	16 December 2021	World Championships	Abu Dhabi, United Arab Emirates	
800m freestyle	8:06.61		Felipe Tapia	-	15 May 2015	-	Santa Fe, Argentina	
800m freestyle	8:03.55	h, †, not ratified	Eduardo Cisternas	Chile	20 December 2021	World Championships	Abu Dhabi, United Arab Emirates	
1500m freestyle	15:23.30	h	Eduardo Cisternas	Chile	20 December 2021	World Championships	Abu Dhabi, United Arab Emirates	
50m backstroke	25.47		Oliver Elliot	Club Mako's	8 October 2016	Chilean Championships	Santiago, Chile	
100m backstroke	54.21		Edhy Vargas	Iron Swim	6 September 2025	Copa España	Santiago, Chile	
200m backstroke	1:58.24		Edhy Vargas	Iron Swim	8 September 2024	Copa España	Santiago, Chile	
50m breaststroke	27.35	h	Mariano Lazzerini	Chile	20 December 2021	World Championships	Abu Dhabi, United Arab Emirates	
50m breaststroke	27.32	not ratified	Mariano Lazzerini	Andes	23 April 2022	Pentatlon Corto EE	Santiago, Chile	
100m breaststroke	59.22	h	Vicente Villanueva	Chile	11 December 2024	World Championships	Budapest, Hungary	
200m breaststroke	2:07.69	h	Vicente Villanueva	Chile	13 December 2024	World Championships	Budapest, Hungary	
50m butterfly	24.06	h	Oliver Elliot	Chile	14 December 2018	World Championships	Hangzhou, China	
50m butterfly	23.87	not ratified	Mariano Lazzerini	Andes	24 April 2022	Pentatlon Corto EE	Santiago, Chile	
100m butterfly	53.31	h	Benjamin Schnnap	Chile	13 December 2024	World Championships	Budapest, Hungary	
200m butterfly	1:58.12		Gabriel Araya	Azura Florida Aquatics	31 October 2021	Puerto Rico International Open	San Juan, Puerto Rico	
100m individual medley	56.03		Manuel Osorio	Andes	8 September 2022	Copa España	Santiago, Chile	
200m individual medley	2:03.40		Manuel Osorio	-	14 December 2019	-	Santiago, Chile	
200m individual medley	1:59.88	not ratified	Mariano Lazzerini	Andes	23 April 2022	Pentatlon Corto EE	Santiago, Chile	
400m individual medley	4:22.52	h	Felipe Quiroz Uteau	Estadio Español	8 October 2016	Chilean Championships	Santiago, Chile	
4×50m freestyle relay	1:33.42		Manuel Osorio (23.07); Matias Tapia (24.33); Vicente Araya (23.32); Elias Ardiles (22.70)	Andes	10 September 2022	Copa España	Santiago, Chile	
4×100m freestyle relay	3:30.53		Emilio Cruz (52.40); Carlos Varas (51.93); Thomas Bate (53.60); Felipe Quintero (52.60)	Estadio Español	30 November 2019	Copa Francia	Santiago, Chile	
4×200m freestyle relay	7:35.97	h	Matias Pinto (1:51.15); Felipe Quiroz (1:54.87); Felipe Tapia (1:52.89); Joaquin Sepulveda (1:57.06)	Chile	9 December 2016	World Championships	Windsor, Canada	
4×50m medley relay	1:43.17		Arturo Cea (26.76); Ignacio Alvarez (28.57); Gabriel Araya (24.35); Lucas Olivos (23.49)	Estadio Mayor	7 September 2018	Copa España	Santiago, Chile	
4×100m medley relay	3:48.89		Thomas Bate (57.79); Ignacio Ortego (1:04.10); Benjamin Schnnap (54.63); Carlos Varas (52.37)	Estadio Español	6 September 2025	Copa España	Santiago, Chile	

Legend: # – Record awaiting ratification by FECHIDA; WR – World record; AM – Americas record;
Records not set in finals: h – heat; sf – semifinal; r – relay 1st leg; rh – relay heat 1st leg; b – B final; † – en route to final mark; so – swim-off; tt – time trial

=== Women ===
Event	Time		Name	Club	Date	Meet	Location	Ref
50 m freestyle	25.66	h	Inés Marín	C.N. Sant Andreu	30 July 2026	CN Sabadell Trophy	Sabadell, Spain	
100 m freestyle	55.28	h	Inés Marín	Chile	14 December 2022	World Championships	Melbourne, Australia	
200 m freestyle	1:58.79	h	Inés Marín	Chile	18 December 2022	World Championships	Melbourne, Australia	
400 m freestyle	4:04.34	h	Kristel Köbrich	Chile	15 November 2009	World Cup	Berlin, Germany	
800 m freestyle	8:08.02		Kristel Köbrich	Chile	14 November 2009	World Cup	Berlin, Germany	
1500 m freestyle	15:51.44		Kristel Köbrich	Chile	26 September 2010	José Finkel Trophy	Rio de Janeiro, Brazil	
50m backstroke	29.16	h	Sarah Szklaruk	Chile	19 December 2021	World Championships	Abu Dhabi, United Arab Emirates	
100m backstroke	1:01.36	h	Sarah Szklaruk	Chile	16 December 2021	World Championships	Abu Dhabi, United Arab Emirates	
200m backstroke	2:15.10		Trinidad Ardiles	Estadio Mayor	15 September 2019	Copa España	Santiago, Chile	
50m breaststroke	32.62		Fernanda Reyes	Club Deportivo UC	6 September 2025	Copa España	Santiago, Chile	
100m breaststroke	1:11.30		Fernanda Reyes	Club Deportivo UC	6 September 2025	Copa España	Santiago, Chile	
200m breaststroke	2:34.02		Antonia Cubillos	Iron Swim	10 September 2022	-	Santiago, Chile	
50m butterfly	27.28		Inés Marín	Estadio Español	7 September 2025	Copa España	Santiago, Chile	
100m butterfly	1:00.84		Inés Marín	Estadio Español	5 September 2025	Copa España	Santiago, Chile	
200m butterfly	2:18.68		Inés Marín	Estadio Español	6 September 2018	Copa España	Santiago, Chile	
100m individual medley	1:04.29		Fernanda Reyes	Club Deportivo UC	5 April 2025	Torneo Medio Fondo Estadio Espanol	Santiago, Chile	
200m individual medley	2:19.76		Fernanda Reyes	Club Deportivo UC	6 September 2025	Copa España	Santiago, Chile	
400m individual medley	4:45.46		Kristel Köbrich	EC Pinheiros	23 September 2010	José Finkel Trophy	Rio de Janeiro, Brazil	
4×50m freestyle relay	1:50.25		Inés Marín (26.92); Marianne Spuhr (28.14); Amelie Engell (27.81); Arantza Salazar (27.38)	Estadio Español	14 September 2019	Copa España	Santiago, Chile	
4×100m freestyle relay	3:59.03		Sarah Szlaruk (59.21); Fernanda Reyes (59.27); Daniela Reyes (59.80); Trinidad Ardiles (1:00.75)	Club Deportivo UC	7 September 2025	Copa España	Santiago, Chile	
4×200m freestyle relay	9:03.30		Alejandra Cárdenas; Desiree Grinspun; Mónica Casanegra; Stefania Pavlov	Universidad Católica	4 July 2001	-	Santiago, Chile	
4×50m medley relay	2:01.74		Marianne Spuhr; Bennewitz; Inés Marín; Arantza Salazar	Estadio Español	8 September 2017	Copa España	Santiago, Chile	
4×100m medley relay	4:22.72		Trinidad Ardiles (1:05.12); Fernanda Reyes (1:11.97); Daniela Reyes (1:05.99); Sarah Szlaruk (59.64)	Club Deportivo UC	6 September 2025	Copa España	Santiago, Chile	

Legend: # – Record awaiting ratification by FECHIDA; WR – World record; AM – Americas record;
Records not set in finals: h – heat; sf – semifinal; r – relay 1st leg; rh – relay heat 1st leg; b – B final; † – en route to final mark; so – swim-off; tt – time trial

=== Mixed relay ===
Event	Time	Name	Club	Date	Meet	Location	Ref
4×50 m freestyle relay	1:41.34	Carlos Varas; Cruz; Arantza Salazar; Inés Marín	Estadio Español	9 September 2018	-	Santiago, Chile	
4×100 m freestyle relay	3:48.19	Cruz; Carlos Varas; Monserrat Vicuña; Inés Marín	Estadio Español	14 May 2016	-	Santiago, Chile	
4×50 m medley relay	1:51.35	Ardiles; Álvarez; Araya; Bustamante	Estadio Mayor	6 September 2018	-	Santiago, Chile	
4×100 m medley relay	4:12.71	Cea; Alvarez; Araya; Monserrat Vicuña	-	5 October 2016	-	Talca, Chile	

Legend: # – Record awaiting ratification by FECHIDA; WR – World record; AM – Americas record;
Records not set in finals: h – heat; so – swim-off
