= 2018 FINA World Swimming Championships (25 m) – Men's 200 metre butterfly =

Men's 200 metre butterfly at the 2018 FINA World Swimming Championships (25 m)
- Venue: Hangzhou Sports Park Stadium
- Dates: 11 December (heats and final)
- Competitors: 39 from 34 nations
- Winning time: 1:48.24 WR

Medalists
gold medal	Daiya Seto	Japan
silver medal	Chad le Clos	South Africa
bronze medal	Li Zhuhao	China

The men's 200 metre butterfly competition of the 2018 FINA World Swimming Championships (25 m) was held on 11 December 2018.

== Records ==
Prior to the competition, the existing world and championship records were as follows.

	Name	Nation	Time	Location	Date
World record	Chad le Clos	South Africa	1:48.56	Singapore	5 November 2013
Championship record	Chad le Clos	South Africa	1:48.61	Doha, Qatar	7 December 2014

The following records were established during the competition:

Date	Event	Name	Nation	Time	Record
11 December	Final	Daiya Seto	Japan	1:48.24	WR

== Results ==
=== Heats ===
The heats were started at 10:23.

Rank	Heat	Lane	Name	Nationality	Time	Notes
1	4	4	Daiya Seto	Japan	1:49.88	Q
2	4	5	Li Zhuhao	China	1:51.28	Q
3	2	5	Luiz Altamir Melo	Brazil	1:51.31	Q
4	2	4	Aleksandr Kharlanov	Russia	1:51.58	Q
5	4	1	Zach Harting	United States	1:51.66	Q
6	4	0	Antani Ivanov	Bulgaria	1:51.81	Q
7	3	4	Chad le Clos	South Africa	1:51.90	Q
8	2	3	Nic Brown	Australia	1:52.15	Q
9	3	5	Yuya Yajima	Japan	1:52.62	
10	4	9	Brendan Hyland	Ireland	1:53.19	
11	2	2	Sajan Prakash	India	1:53.20	
12	3	3	Tamás Kenderesi	Hungary	1:53.59	
13	3	1	Deividas Margevičius	Lithuania	1:53.83	
14	2	6	Bence Biczó	Hungary	1:53.99	
15	4	2	Ramon Klenz	Germany	1:54.02	
16	3	7	Federico Burdisso	Italy	1:54.10	
17	4	8	Wilrich Coetzee	New Zealand	1:54.21	
18	4	3	Leonardo de Deus	Brazil	1:54.22	
19	2	8	Erge Can Gezmiş	Turkey	1:54.71	
20	4	6	Wang Kuan-hung	Chinese Taipei	1:55.16	
21	3	2	Roman Shevliakov	Russia	1:55.42	
22	2	7	Nils Liess	Switzerland	1:55.64	
23	3	6	Kregor Zirk	Estonia	1:55.69	
24	3	8	Patrick Staber	Austria	1:55.84	
25	2	1	Denys Kesyl	Ukraine	1:56.04	
26	3	0	Joan Lluís Pons	Spain	1:56.51	
27	1	4	Luis Vega Torres	Cuba	1:57.45	
28	2	9	Richard Nagy	Slovakia	1:57.96	
29	2	0	Nicholas Lim	Hong Kong	1:58.16	
30	1	5	Jarod Arroyo	Puerto Rico	1:58.22	
31	1	3	Gabriel Araya	Chile	1:59.53	
32	3	9	Ayman Kelzi	Syria	2:00.58	
33	1	8	Nichita Bortnicov	Moldova	2:01.30	
34	1	6	Bryan Alvarez	Costa Rica	2:01.57	
35	1	7	Fernando Ponce	Guatemala	2:04.91	
36	1	1	Munzer Kabbara	Lebanon	2:05.29	
37	1	2	Zeniel Guzmán	Dominican Republic	2:05.54	
38	1	0	Yacob Al-Khulaifi	Qatar	2:10.03	
	4	7	Justin Wright	United States	DSQ	

=== Final ===
The final was held at 19:41.

Rank	Lane	Name	Nationality	Time	Notes
1st place, gold medalist(s)	4	Daiya Seto	Japan	1:48.24	WR
2nd place, silver medalist(s)	1	Chad le Clos	South Africa	1:48.32	AF
3rd place, bronze medalist(s)	5	Li Zhuhao	China	1:50.39	NR
4	6	Aleksandr Kharlanov	Russia	1:50.67	
5	2	Zach Harting	United States	1:51.57	
6	3	Luiz Altamir Melo	Brazil	1:51.99	
7	8	Nic Brown	Australia	1:52.10	
8	7	Antani Ivanov	Bulgaria	1:52.40	
