= Swimming at the 2016 European Aquatics Championships – Men's 100 metre butterfly =

Men's 100 metre butterfly at the 2016 European Aquatics Championships
- Dates: 20–21 May
- Competitors: 62 from 29 nations
- Winning time: 50.86

Medalists
gold medal	László Cseh	Hungary
silver medal	Konrad Czerniak	Poland
bronze medal	Mehdy Metella	France

The Men's 100 metre butterfly competition of the 2016 European Aquatics Championships was held on 20 and 21 May 2016.

== Records ==
Prior to the competition, the existing world, European and championship records were as follows.

	Name	Nation	Time	Location	Date
World record	Michael Phelps	United States	49.82	Rome	1 August 2009
European record	Milorad Čavić	Serbia	49.95	Rome	1 August 2009
Championship record	Konrad Czerniak	Poland	51.38	Berlin	23 August 2014

== Results ==
=== Heats ===
The heats were held on 20 May at 10:42.

Rank	Heat	Lane	Name	Nationality	Time	Notes
1	7	4	László Cseh	Hungary	52.05	Q
2	7	5	Piero Codia	Italy	52.38	Q
3	6	5	Paweł Korzeniowski	Poland	52.46	Q
4	5	4	Konrad Czerniak	Poland	52.48	Q
5	6	4	Mehdy Metella	France	52.49	Q
6	5	5	Matteo Rivolta	Italy	52.65	Q
6	6	3	Lyubomyr Lemeshko	Ukraine	52.65	Q
8	6	9	Søren Dahl	Denmark	52.78	Q
9	5	2	Bence Pulai	Hungary	52.79	Q
10	6	7	Oskar Krupecki	Poland	52.88	
11	5	3	Viktor Bromer	Denmark	52.89	Q
12	5	6	Nikolay Skvortsov	Russia	53.06	Q
13	7	7	Andreas Vazaios	Greece	53.09	Q
14	7	1	Oleksiy Ivanov	Ukraine	53.21	Q
15	6	1	Stefanos Dimitriadis	Greece	53.23	Q
15	7	6	Ivan Lenđer	Serbia	53.23	Q
17	5	1	Robert Žbogar	Slovenia	53.24	Q
18	5	0	Jan Šefl	Czech Republic	53.39	
19	6	6	Andriy Khloptsov	Ukraine	53.45	
20	5	7	Nico van Duijn	Switzerland	53.48	
21	4	8	Jesper Björk	Sweden	53.50	
22	5	8	Mario Todorović	Croatia	53.58	
23	5	9	Tamás Kenderesi	Hungary	53.60	
24	3	5	Antani Ivanov	Bulgaria	53.69	
25	6	0	Paul Lemaire	France	53.70	
26	3	2	Alexander Kunert	Germany	53.74	
27	6	2	Alexandru Coci	Romania	53.75	
28	3	3	Kaan Türker Ayar	Turkey	53.78	
29	4	2	Nils Liess	Switzerland	53.80	
30	3	9	Diogo Carvalho	Portugal	53.85	
31	7	9	Kregor Zirk	Estonia	53.87	
32	3	7	Daniel Zaitsev	Estonia	53.92	
32	4	6	Tom Kremer	Israel	53.92	
34	4	5	Markus Gierke	Germany	53.94	
34	7	0	Giacomo Carini	Italy	53.94	
36	7	2	Marcus Schlesinger	Israel	53.96	
37	7	8	Deividas Margevicius	Lithuania	53.97	
38	3	6	Alexander Linge	Sweden	54.01	
39	2	7	Petr Novák	Czech Republic	54.04	
40	4	7	Carlos Peralta	Spain	54.07	
41	4	1	Brendan Hyland	Ireland	54.08	
42	4	4	Guy Barnea	Israel	54.09	
43	3	0	Miguel Nascimento	Portugal	54.24	
44	4	0	Filip Milcevic	Austria	54.30	
44	3	8	Aleksi Schmid	Switzerland	54.30	
46	4	3	Sascha Subarsky	Austria	54.33	
47	2	6	Tadas Duškinas	Lithuania	54.34	
48	3	4	Nuno Quintanilha	Portugal	54.41	
49	2	8	Tomas Havránek	Czech Republic	54.54	
50	3	1	Bence Biczó	Hungary	54.55	
51	1	5	Sindri Jakobsson	Norway	54.58	
52	2	3	Ralf Tribuntsov	Estonia	54.75	
53	2	2	Mislav Sever	Croatia	54.87	
54	2	9	Arkadi Kalinovski	Estonia	54.90	
55	2	4	Raphaël Stacchiotti	Luxembourg	54.95	
56	4	9	Povilas Strazdas	Lithuania	55.00	
57	1	3	Berk Özkul	Turkey	55.03	
58	2	1	Yonatan Batsha	Israel	55.82	
59	1	4	Thomas Maurer	Switzerland	56.23	
60	1	6	Alexei Sancov	Moldova	57.62	
61	1	2	Pavel Izbisciuc	Moldova	57.69	
	7	3	Joeri Verlinden	Netherlands	DSQ	
	2	0	Duncan Scott	Great Britain	DNS	
	2	5	Phillipp Forster	Germany	DNS	
	6	8	Louis Croenen	Belgium	DNS	

=== Semifinals ===
The semifinals were held on 20 May at 18:25.

==== Semifinal 1 ====
Rank	Lane	Name	Nationality	Time	Notes
1	5	Konrad Czerniak	Poland	51.90	Q
2	4	Piero Codia	Italy	52.16	Q
3	3	Lyubomyr Lemeshko	Ukraine	52.38	Q
4	2	Viktor Bromer	Denmark	52.43	Q
5	7	Andreas Vazaios	Greece	52.76	
6	1	Ivan Lenđer	Serbia	52.96	
7	6	Søren Dahl	Denmark	52.99	
8	8	Robert Žbogar	Slovenia	53.18	

==== Semifinal 2 ====
Rank	Lane	Name	Nationality	Time	Notes
1	4	László Cseh	Hungary	51.64	Q
2	3	Mehdy Metella	France	52.00	Q
3	5	Paweł Korzeniowski	Poland	52.11	Q
4	6	Matteo Rivolta	Italy	52.33	Q
5	7	Nikolay Skvortsov	Russia	52.69	
6	2	Bence Pulai	Hungary	52.73	
7	1	Oleksiy Ivanov	Ukraine	52.98	
8	8	Stefanos Dimitriadis	Greece	53.07	

=== Final ===
The final was on 21 May at 16:30.

Rank	Lane	Name	Nationality	Time	Notes
1st place, gold medalist(s)	4	László Cseh	Hungary	50.86	CR
2nd place, silver medalist(s)	5	Konrad Czerniak	Poland	51.22	
3rd place, bronze medalist(s)	3	Mehdy Metella	France	51.70	
4	2	Piero Codia	Italy	51.82	
5	7	Matteo Rivolta	Italy	51.96	
6	6	Paweł Korzeniowski	Poland	51.98	
7	1	Lyubomyr Lemeshko	Ukraine	52.25	
8	8	Viktor Bromer	Denmark	53.00	
