= Nic Brown =

Nic Brown may refer to:

- Nic Brown (swimmer)
- Nic Brown (drummer)

== See also ==
- Nick Brown (disambiguation)
