= Swimming at the 2016 Summer Olympics – Men's 100 metre butterfly =

Men's 100 metre butterfly at the Games of the XXXI Olympiad
- Venue: Olympic Aquatics Stadium
- Dates: 11 August 2016 (heats & semifinals); 12 August 2016 (final)
- Competitors: 43 from 32 nations
- Winning time: 50.39 OR

Medalists
1st place, gold medalist(s)		Joseph Schooling	Singapore
2nd place, silver medalist(s)		Michael Phelps	United States
2nd place, silver medalist(s)		Chad le Clos	South Africa
2nd place, silver medalist(s)		László Cseh	Hungary

The men's 100 metre butterfly event at the 2016 Summer Olympics took place on 11–12 August at the Olympic Aquatics Stadium.

== Summary ==
Michael Phelps fell short of his attempt to fulfill an Olympic four-peat in the sprint butterfly event, due to a brilliant performance of Joseph Schooling, who became Singapore's first ever Olympic gold medalist. The Singapore National Olympic Council awarded Schooling S$1 million (about US$740,000) under the Multi-Million Dollar Award Programme (MAP). Singapore's unique "rewards for sports excellence" were the world's largest Olympic cash prize. Leading from the start, Schooling defeated the field of experienced sprinters, including all-time medal leader and his personal hero Phelps, to establish a new Olympic record of 50.39 for a gold-medal triumph. Schooling did not only erase Phelps' eight-year-old record by 0.19 seconds, but also produced the fastest time of the event in textile.

Three-quarters of a second later, Phelps touched the wall at the same moment as two of his rivals Chad le Clos of South Africa and four-time Olympian László Cseh of Hungary, leaving them with a matching 51.14 in a historic three-way tie for the silver. Despite missing out an Olympic title defense, Phelps continued to extend his Olympic résumé with a twenty-seventh career medal.

Separated by the leader of the field by almost a second, Chinese swimmer and 2014 Youth Olympic champion Li Zhuhao picked up the fifth spot with a junior world record of 51.26. Meanwhile, France's Mehdy Metella (51.58), Phelps' teammate Tom Shields (51.73), and Russia's Aleksandr Sadovnikov (51.84) closed out the championship field.

Notable swimmers failed to reach the top eight roster, featuring Schooling's countryman Quah Zheng Wen; London 2012 finalists Steffen Deibler (Germany), Joeri Verlinden (Netherlands), and Konrad Czerniak (Poland); Canada's Santo Condorelli, who produced a surprising top 16 finish from an unseeded prelims heat; and Papua New Guinea's Ryan Pini, who missed another chance to reproduce a top eight feat from Beijing 2008 in his fourth Olympic appearance.

== Records ==
Prior to this competition, the existing world and Olympic records were:

World record	Michael Phelps (USA)	49.82	Rome, Italy	1 August 2009
Olympic record	Michael Phelps (USA)	50.58	Beijing, China	16 August 2008

The following records were established during the competition:

Date	Event	Name	Nationality	Time	Record
12 August	Final	Joseph Schooling	Singapore	50.39	OR

== Competition format ==
The competition consisted of three rounds: heats, semifinals, and a final. The swimmers with the best 16 times in the heats advanced to the semifinals. The swimmers with the best 8 times in the semifinals advanced to the final. Swim-offs were used as necessary to break ties for advancement to the next round.

== Results ==
=== Heats ===
Rank	Heat	Lane	Name	Nationality	Time	Notes
1	6	5	Joseph Schooling	Singapore	51.41	Q
2	4	4	László Cseh	Hungary	51.52	Q
3	5	5	Tom Shields	United States	51.58	Q
4	6	4	Michael Phelps	United States	51.60	Q
5	5	3	Mehdy Metella	France	51.71	Q
6	4	3	Piero Codia	Italy	51.72	Q
7	5	4	Chad le Clos	South Africa	51.75	Q
8	3	5	James Guy	Great Britain	51.78	Q
8	6	3	Li Zhuhao	China	51.78	Q
10	4	5	Konrad Czerniak	Poland	51.81	Q
10	5	7	David Morgan	Australia	51.81	Q
12	6	1	Grant Irvine	Australia	51.84	Q
13	6	2	Aleksandr Sadovnikov	Russia	51.91	Q
14	2	4	Santo Condorelli	Canada	51.99	Q
15	4	6	Evgeny Koptelov	Russia	52.01	Q
16	3	7	Quah Zheng Wen	Singapore	52.08	Q
17	4	7	Jérémy Stravius	France	52.10	
18	4	1	Steffen Deibler	Germany	52.14	
19	3	8	Luis Martínez	Guatemala	52.22	
20	6	7	Takuro Fujii	Japan	52.36	
21	3	4	Henrique Martins	Brazil	52.42	
22	5	1	Joeri Verlinden	Netherlands	52.48	
23	3	2	Liubomyr Lemeshko	Ukraine	52.51	
24	4	8	Santiago Grassi	Argentina	52.56	
25	5	2	Matteo Rivolta	Italy	52.67	
26	5	8	Bence Pulai	Hungary	52.73	
27	3	1	Zhang Qibin	China	52.84	
28	4	2	Pavel Sankovich	Belarus	53.00	
29	6	8	Albert Subirats	Venezuela	53.23	
30	2	5	Ryan Pini	Papua New Guinea	53.24	
30	6	6	Yauhen Tsurkin	Belarus	53.24	
32	3	6	Long Yuan Gutiérrez	Mexico	53.34	
33	5	6	Paweł Korzeniowski	Poland	53.71	
34	3	3	Marcos Macedo	Brazil	53.87	
35	2	3	Glenn Victor Sutanto	Indonesia	54.25	
36	2	6	Abbas Qali	Independent Olympic Athletes	54.63	
37	2	8	Anthonny Sitraka Ralefy	Madagascar	54.72	
38	2	1	Ralph Goveia	Zambia	54.84	
39	2	2	Allan Gutiérrez Castro	Honduras	55.20	
40	2	7	Rami Anis	Refugee Olympic Team	56.23	
41	1	4	Oumar Toure	Mali	57.56	
42	1	5	Hannibal Gaskin	Guyana	58.57	
43	1	3	Thint Myaat	Myanmar	1:02.54	

=== Semifinals ===
==== Semifinal 1 ====
Rank	Lane	Name	Nationality	Time	Notes
1	4	László Cseh	Hungary	51.57	Q
2	5	Michael Phelps	United States	51.58	Q
3	2	Konrad Czerniak	Poland	51.80	
4	3	Piero Codia	Italy	51.82	
5	1	Santo Condorelli	Canada	51.83	
6	7	Grant Irvine	Australia	51.87	
7	6	James Guy	Great Britain	52.10	
8	8	Quah Zheng Wen	Singapore	52.26	

==== Semifinal 2 ====
Rank	Lane	Name	Nationality	Time	Notes
1	4	Joseph Schooling	Singapore	50.83	Q, AS
2	6	Chad le Clos	South Africa	51.43	Q
3	2	Li Zhuhao	China	51.51	Q
4	5	Tom Shields	United States	51.61	Q
5	1	Aleksandr Sadovnikov	Russia	51.71	Q
6	3	Mehdy Metella	France	51.73	Q
7	7	David Morgan	Australia	51.75	
8	8	Evgeny Koptelov	Russia	52.50	

=== Final ===
Rank	Lane	Name	Nationality	Time	Notes
1st place, gold medalist(s)	4	Joseph Schooling	Singapore	50.39	OR, AS
2nd place, silver medalist(s)	2	Michael Phelps	United States	51.14	
2nd place, silver medalist(s)	5	Chad le Clos	South Africa	51.14	
2nd place, silver medalist(s)	6	László Cseh	Hungary	51.14	
5	3	Li Zhuhao	China	51.26	
6	8	Mehdy Metella	France	51.58	
7	7	Tom Shields	United States	51.73	
8	1	Aleksandr Sadovnikov	Russia	51.84	
