= Nick Brown (disambiguation) =

Nick Brown (born 1950) is a British Labour Party politician, MP for Newcastle upon Tyne and former government minister.

Nick Brown may also refer to:

- Nick Brown (tennis) (born 1961), British tennis player and coach
- Nick Brown (lawyer) (born 1977), Washington State Attorney General, former United States Attorney and former Survivor contestant
- Nick Brown (academic) (born 1962), British botanist and academic
- Nick Brown (umpire), Australian rules football umpire
- Nick Allen Brown (born 1978), American author and speaker

== See also ==
- Nicholas Brown (disambiguation)
- Nic Brown (swimmer)
- Nic Brown (drummer)
