= 2014 FINA World Swimming Championships (25 m) – Men's 4 × 100 metre medley relay =

Men's 4 × 100 metre medley relay at the 2014 FINA World Swimming Championships (25 m)
- Dates: 7 December
- Competitors: 92 from 23 nations
- Winning time: 3:21.14

Medalists
gold medal	Guilherme Guido; Felipe França Silva; Marcos Macedo; César Cielo	Brazil
silver medal	Matt Grevers; Cody Miller; Tom Shields; Ryan Lochte	United States
bronze medal	Florent Manaudou; Giacomo Perez-Dortona; Mehdy Metella; Clément Mignon	France

The Men's 4 × 100 metre medley relay competition of the 2014 FINA World Swimming Championships (25 m) was held on 7 December.

== Records ==
Prior to the competition, the existing world and championship records were as follows.

	Nation	Time	Location	Date
World record	Russia	3:19.16	Saint Petersburg	20 December 2009
Championship record	United States	3:20.99	Dubai	19 December 2010

== Results ==
=== Heats ===
The heats were held at 11:23.

Rank	Heat	Lane	Nation	Swimmers	Time	Notes
1	3	8	France	Benjamin Stasiulis (50.89); Giacomo Perez-Dortona (57.01); Mehdy Metella (50.15); Clément Mignon (45.92)	3:23.97	Q
2	1	5	Australia	Mitch Larkin (50.00); Jake Packard (57.80); Tommaso D'Orsogna (49.95); Matthew Abood (46.87)	3:24.62	Q
3	1	4	Russia	Stanislav Donets (50.50); Oleg Kostin (57.26); Aleksandr Popkov (50.67); Oleg Tikhobaev (46.59)	3:25.02	Q
4	3	9	Germany	Christian Diener (50.78); Marco Koch (57.40); Steffen Deibler (50.11); Marco di Carli (47.50)	3:25.79	Q
5	2	5	United States	Eugene Godsoe (50.52); Brad Craig (57.73); Darian Townsend (51.01); Jimmy Feigen (47.03)	3:26.29	Q
6	3	5	Japan	Kosuke Hagino (51.21); Yasuhiro Koseki (57.67); Takuro Fujii (50.86); Katsumi Nakamura (46.65)	3:26.39	Q
7	2	0	Brazil	Guilherme Guido (51.05); João Luiz Gomes Júnior (58.46); Marcos Macedo (49.51); Henrique Martins (47.50)	3:26.52	Q
8	3	4	Great Britain	Chris Walker-Hebborn (51.45); Adam Peaty (57.38); Adam Barrett (51.09); Ben Proud (46.89)	3:26.81	Q
9	2	6	Italy	Niccolo Bonacchi (51.56); Andrea Toniato (58.40); Matteo Rivolta (50.67); Luca Dotto (46.42)	3:27.05	
10	2	7	Hungary	Dávid Földházi (52.17); Dániel Gyurta (56.97); Péter Holoda (51.60); Dominik Kozma (46.40)	3:27.14	
11	2	9	Lithuania	Danas Rapšys (51.25); Giedrius Titenis (58.79); Tadas Duškinas (50.83); Mindaugas Sadauskas (47.89)	3:28.76	
12	2	2	Croatia	Saša Gerbec (53.85); Kristijan Tomić (58.97); Mario Todorović (51.98); Ivan Levaj (47.51)	3:32.31	
13	3	3	Czech Republic	Martin Baďura (53.02); Petr Bartůněk (59.77); Jan Šefl (52.14); David Kunčar (48.96)	3:33.89	
14	3	2	South Africa	Charl Crous (53.23); Giulio Zorzi (1:00.69); Clayton Jimmie (53.11); Leith Shankland (47.60)	3:34.63	
15	2	8	Uzbekistan	Daniil Bukin (55.37); Vladislav Mustafin (1:00.15); Aleksey Derlyugov (53.39); Khurshidjon Tursunov (49.25)	3:38.16	
16	1	1	Paraguay	Charles Hockin (54.77); Renato Prono (1:01.69); Max Abreu (53.74); Ben Hockin (48.09)	3:38.29	
17	2	1	Hong Kong	Lau Shiu Yue (54.75); Wong Chun Yan (1:02.33); Ng Chun Nam (55.66); Mak Ho Lun (50.11)	3:42.85	
18	1	6	Iceland	Davíð Hildiberg Aðalsteinsson (54.63); Kristinn Þórarinsson (1:03.13); Daniel Pálsson (55.03); Kristofer Sigurðsson (50.37)	3:43.16	
19	2	4	Philippines	Axel Ngui (58.53); Joshua Hall (1:00.98); Dhill Lee (53.74); Jeremy Lim (52.65)	3:45.90	
20	3	0	Macau	Yum Cheng Man (59.99); Chao Man Hou (1:00.47); Sio Ka Kun (59.55); Wong Pok Lao (53.92)	3:53.93	
21	1	3	Papua New Guinea	Ryan Pini (52.46); Livingston Aika (1:14.15); Bobby Akunaii (1:02.23); Stanford Kawale (54.69)	4:03.53	
22	1	2	Albania	Aleksander Ngresi (1:09.36); Deni Baholli (1:13.32); Franci Aleksi (1:01.95); Klavio Meça (57.01)	4:21.64	
23	3	6	Seychelles	Dean Hoffman (1:06.34); Pierre-Andre Adam (1:08.14); Adam Moncherry (1:04.88); Justin Payet (1:02.66)	4:22.02	
—	1	7	Bahamas			DNS
—	2	3	China			DNS
—	3	1	Switzerland			DNS
—	3	7	Algeria			DNS

=== Final ===
The final was held at 20:13..

Rank	Lane	Nation	Swimmers	Time	Notes
1st place, gold medalist(s)	1	Brazil	Guilherme Guido (50.11); Felipe França Silva (56.73); Marcos Macedo (49.63); César Cielo (44.67)	3:21.14	SA
2nd place, silver medalist(s)	2	United States	Matt Grevers (49.79); Cody Miller (57.03); Tom Shields (48.80); Ryan Lochte (45.87)	3:21.49	
3rd place, bronze medalist(s)	4	France	Florent Manaudou (50.35); Giacomo Perez-Dortona (57.00); Mehdy Metella (49.07); Clément Mignon (45.84)	3:22.26	
4	3	Russia	Stanislav Donets (50.28); Kirill Prigoda (57.20); Yevgeny Korotyshkin (49.50); Vladimir Morozov (45.55)	3:22.53	
5	8	Great Britain	Chris Walker-Hebborn (50.57); Adam Peaty (56.23); Adam Barrett (49.01); Ben Proud (46.97)	3:22.78	
6	5	Australia	Mitch Larkin (49.99); Jake Packard (57.22); Tommaso D'Orsogna (49.87); Cameron McEvoy (45.78)	3:22.86	
7	7	Japan	Ryosuke Irie (50.28); Yasuhiro Koseki (56.62); Kosuke Hagino (49.98); Shinri Shioura (46.04)	3:22.92	
8	6	Germany	Christian Diener (50.93); Marco Koch (56.79); Steffen Deibler (49.72); Markus Deibler (45.93)	3:23.37	
