= 2018 FINA World Swimming Championships (25 m) – Men's 4 × 100 metre medley relay =

Men's 4 × 100 metre medley relay at the 2018 FINA World Swimming Championships (25 m)
- Venue: Hangzhou Sports Park Stadium
- Dates: 16 December (heats and final)
- Nations: 17
- Winning time: 3:19.98 CR

Medalists
gold medal	Ryan Murphy; Andrew Wilson; Caeleb Dressel; Ryan Held; Matt Grevers; Michael Andrew; Jack Conger; Blake Pieroni	United States
silver medal	Kliment Kolesnikov; Kirill Prigoda; Mikhail Vekovishchev; Vladimir Morozov; Andrey Shabasov; Oleg Kostin; Aleksandr Kharlanov; Vladislav Grinev	Russia
bronze medal	Ryosuke Irie; Yasuhiro Koseki; Takeshi Kawamoto; Katsumi Nakamura; Yuma Edo	Japan

The men's 4 × 100 metre medley relay competition of the 2018 FINA World Swimming Championships (25 m) was held on 16 December 2018.

== Records ==
Prior to the competition, the existing world and championship records were as follows.

	Name	Nation	Time	Location	Date
World record	Stanislav Donets (49.63); Sergey Geybel (56.43); Yevgeny Korotyshkin (48.35); Danila Izotov (44.75)	Russia	3:19.16	Saint Petersburg	20 December 2009
Championship record	Nick Thoman (49.88); Mihail Alexandrov (56.52); Ryan Lochte (49.17); Garrett Weber-Gale (45.42)	United States	3:20.99	Dubai, UAE	19 December 2010

The following records were established during the competition:

Date	Event	Name	Nation	Time	Record
16 December	Final	Ryan Murphy (49.63); Andrew Wilson (56.84); Caeleb Dressel (48.28); Ryan Held (45.23)	United States	3:19.98	CR

== Results ==
=== Heats ===
The heats were started at 10:09.

Rank	Heat	Lane	Nation	Swimmers	Time	Notes
1	2	6	United States	Matt Grevers (49.97); Michael Andrew (57.70); Jack Conger (49.45); Blake Pieroni (46.10)	3:23.22	Q
2	2	7	Brazil	Guilherme Guido (50.12); Diego Prado (57.11); Nicholas Santos (50.32); Breno Correia (46.31)	3:23.86	Q
3	1	7	Germany	Ramon Klenz (52.69); Marco Koch (56.56); Marius Kusch (48.67); Damian Wierling (46.80)	3:24.72	Q
4	1	1	Belarus	Viktar Staselovich (51.55); Ilya Shymanovich (56.12); Yauhen Tsurkin(50.15); Artsiom Machekin (47.27)	3:25.09	Q
5	1	5	Russia	Andrey Shabasov (51.15); Oleg Kostin (57.58); Aleksandr Kharlanov (50.36); Vladislav Grinev (46.08)	3:25.17	Q
6	1	6	Lithuania	Danas Rapšys (51.64); Andrius Šidlauskas (57.25); Deividas Margevičius (50.59); Simonas Bilis (45.83)	3:25.31	Q
7	1	3	Japan	Yuma Edo (51.35); Yasuhiro Koseki (57.31); Takeshi Kawamoto (50.04); Katsumi Nakamura (46.64)	3:25.34	Q
8	1	4	Australia	Mitch Larkin (50.64); Grayson Bell (58.34); Nic Brown (50.55); Cameron McEvoy (46.21)	3:25.74	Q
9	2	2	Italy	Simone Sabbioni (51.61); Nicolò Martinenghi (57.23); Matteo Rivolta (49.89); Alessandro Miressi (47.38)	3:26.11	R
10	2	4	Ireland	Conor Ferguson (52.18); Darragh Greene (57.82); Brendan Hyland (51.38); Shane Ryan (45.85)	3:27.23	R
11	2	0	Austria	Bernhard Reitshammer (52.87); Christopher Rothbauer (59.31); Sascha Subarsky (52.52); Heiko Gigler (47.23)	3:31.93	
12	1	8	New Zealand	Bradlee Ashby (52.18); George Schroder (1:01.08); Wilrich Coetzee (52.01); Daniel Hunter (47.40)	3:32.67	
13	2	8	Switzerland	Thierry Bollin (53.45); Yannick Käser (58.02); Nils Liess (52.28); Manuel Leuthard (49.35)	3:33.10	
14	1	2	Chinese Taipei	Chuang Mu-lun (54.06); Cai Bing-rong (59.55); Wang Kuan-hung (53.30); Lin Chien-liang (49.12)	3:36.03	
15	2	1	Slovakia	Ádám Halás (54.72); Tomáš Klobučník (58.65); Richard Nagy (54.27); Marek Botík (52.37)	3:40.01	
	2	3	Turkey	İskender Başlakov (52.26); Hüseyin Emre Sakçı (58.57); Umitcan Gures; Kemal Arda Gürdal	DSQ	
	2	5	China	Li Guangyuan (51.79); Wang Lizhuo (56.98); Li Zhuhao; Cao Jiwen	DSQ	

=== Final ===
The final was held at 19:45.

Rank	Lane	Nation	Swimmers	Time	Notes
1st place, gold medalist(s)	4	United States	Ryan Murphy (49.63); Andrew Wilson (56.84); Caeleb Dressel (48.28); Ryan Held (45.23)	3:19.98	CR, AM
2nd place, silver medalist(s)	2	Russia	Kliment Kolesnikov (49.62); Kirill Prigoda (55.98); Mikhail Vekovishchev (50.00); Vladimir Morozov (45.01)	3:20.61	
3rd place, bronze medalist(s)	1	Japan	Ryosuke Irie (49.95); Yasuhiro Koseki (55.91); Takeshi Kawamoto (49.58); Katsumi Nakamura (45.63)	3:21.07	AS
4	5	Brazil	Guilherme Guido (49.89); Felipe Lima (56.39); Nicholas Santos (49.42); Breno Correia (46.30)	3:22.00	
5	3	Germany	Christian Diener (50.01); Marco Koch (56.68); Marius Kusch (48.91); Damian Wierling (46.57)	3:22.17	
6	6	Belarus	Viktar Staselovich (51.94); Ilya Shymanovich (55.60); Yauhen Tsurkin(49.59); Artsiom Machekin (47.28)	3:24.41	
7	7	Lithuania	Danas Rapšys (51.44); Andrius Šidlauskas (57.14); Deividas Margevičius (50.01); Simonas Bilis (45.92)	3:24.51	
8	8	Australia	Mitch Larkin (49.47); Grayson Bell (58.20); Nic Brown (50.53); Cameron McEvoy (46.45)	3:24.65	
