= 2016 FINA World Swimming Championships (25 m) – Men's 4 × 100 metre medley relay =

Part of the 2016 FINA World Swimming Championships

Men's 4 × 100 metre medley relay at the 2016 FINA World Swimming Championships (25 m)
- Venue: WFCU Centre
- Dates: 11 December
- Competitors: 84 from 21 nations
- Teams: 21
- Winning time: 3:21.17

Medalists
gold medal	Andrey Shabasov; Kirill Prigoda; Aleksandr Kharlanov; Vladimir Morozov; Grigoriy Tarasevich; Oleg Kostin; Aleksandr Popkov	Russia
silver medal	Mitch Larkin; Tommy Sucipto; David Morgan; Tommaso D'Orsogna; Robert Hurley; Daniel Smith	Australia
bronze medal	Junya Koga; Yoshiki Yamanaka; Takeshi Kawamoto; Shinri Shioura; Kenta Ito	Japan

The Men's 4 × 100 metre medley relay competition of the 2016 FINA World Swimming Championships (25 m) was held on 11 December 2016.

== Records ==
Prior to the competition, the existing world and championship records were as follows.

	Nation	Time	Location	Date
World record	Russia	3:19.16	Saint Petersburg	20 December 2009
Championship record	United States	3:20.99	Dubai	19 December 2010

== Results ==
=== Heats ===
The heats were held at 10:19.

Rank	Heat	Lane	Nation	Swimmers	Time	Notes
1	1	5	Australia	Robert Hurley (51.11); Tommy Sucipto (57.95); David Morgan (49.73); Daniel Smith (46.96)	3:25.75	Q
2	2	9	Russia	Grigory Tarasevich (51.34); Oleg Kostin (57.66); Aleksandr Kharlanov (49.95); Aleksandr Popkov (46.89)	3:25.84	Q
3	3	8	Belarus	Pavel Sankovich (51.47); Ilya Shymanovich (56.99); Yauhen Tsurkin (50.40); Artsiom Machekin (47.44)	3:26.30	Q
4	2	0	United States	Matthew Josa (52.09); Nic Fink (57.68); Josh Prenot (50.24); Michael Chadwick (46.87)	3:26.88	Q
5	3	3	Great Britain	Charlie Boldison (51.92); Ross Murdoch (57.31); Adam Barrett (49.65); Stephen Milne (48.15)	3:27.03	Q
5	3	4	France	Thomas Avetand (52.14); Jean Dencausse (58.91); Jérémy Stravius (49.51); Clément Mignon (46.47)	3:27.03	Q
7	3	5	China	Xu Jiayu (50.72); Yan Zibei (57.87); Li Zhuhao (51.18); Lin Yongqing (47.61)	3:27.38	Q
8	2	3	Japan	Junya Koga (51.71); Yoshiki Yamanaka (57.88); Takeshi Kawamoto (50.29); Kenta Ito (47.59)	3:27.47	Q
9	2	2	Sweden	Simon Sjödin (51.63); Erik Persson (58.01); Jesper Björk (51.64); Christoffer Carlsen (46.75)	3:28.03	
10	1	3	Canada	Javier Acevedo (53.35); Richard Funk (57.35); Mackenzie Darragh (51.94); Yuri Kisil (46.49)	3:29.13	
11	1	4	Portugal	Gabriel Lopes (52.38); Diogo Carvalho (59.51); Alexis Santos (51.68); Miguel Nascimento (46.64)	3:30.21	
12	2	4	South Africa	Neil Fair (53.61); Alaric Basson (1:00.62); Alard Basson (53.25); Douglas Erasmus (47.52)	3:35.00	
13	3	1	Paraguay	Charles Hockin (53.28); Renato Prono (1:00.62); Benjamin Hockin (51.88); Matias Lopez (51.60)	3:37.38	
14	2	6	Hong Kong	Ho Lun Raymond Mak (55.85); Hoi Tun Raymond Tsui (1:01.00); Chun Nam Derick Ng (52.58); Kin Tat Kent Cheung (48.70)	3:38.13	
15	2	1	Iceland	David Adalsteisson (54.36); Viktor Mani Vilbergsson (1:01.19); Kristinn Porarinsson (54.53); Aron Orn Steffansson (49.40)	3:39.48	
16	2	7	Singapore	Kai Quan Yeo (56.14); Chien Yin Lionel Khoo (1:00.46); Dylan Koo (54.17); Sheng Jun Pang (50.15)	3:40.92	
17	3	7	Macau	Pok Man Ngou (55.82); Man Hou Chao (59.29); Ka Kun Sio (56.90); Sizhuang Lin (51.02)	3:43.03	
18	3	9	Philippines	Alberto Batungbacal (58.67); James Deiparine (1:00.64); Jeremy Bryan Lim (56.80); Axel Toni Steven Ngui (51.73)	3:47.84	
19	3	2	Papua New Guinea	Livingston Aika (1:02.53); Ryan Maskelyne (1:03.50); Ryan Pini (52.79); Stanford Kawale (52.28)	3:51.10	
20	2	8	Gibraltar	Jordan Gonzalez (58.45); Colin Bensadon (1:07.62); Matt Dylan Savitz (58.12); James Sanderson (51.73)	3:55.92	
21	3	6	Albania	Kennet Libohova (1:01.64); Deni Baholli (1:06.84); Franci Aleksi (1:01.93); Frenc Berdaku (56.54)	4:06.95	
	2	5	Venezuela			DNS
	3	0	Lithuania			DNS

=== Final ===
The final was held at 20:14.

Rank	Lane	Nation	Swimmers	Time	Notes
1st place, gold medalist(s)	5	Russia	Andrey Shabasov (50.30); Kirill Prigoda (55.78); Aleksandr Kharlanov (49.51); Vladimir Morozov (45.58)	3:21.17	
2nd place, silver medalist(s)	4	Australia	Mitch Larkin (50.24); Tommy Sucipto (57.46); David Morgan (49.32); Tommaso D'Orsogna (46.54)	3:23.56	
3rd place, bronze medalist(s)	8	Japan	Junya Koga (50.26); Yoshiki Yamanaka (57.57); Takeshi Kawamoto (50.02); Shinri Shioura (46.86)	3:24.71	
4	3	Belarus	Pavel Sankovich (50.81); Ilya Shymanovich (56.56); Yauhen Tsurkin (50.51); Artsiom Machekin (47.48)	3:25.36	
5	2	Great Britain	Charlie Boldison (52.08); Ross Murdoch (57.04); Adam Barrett (48.79); Stephen Milne (47.86)	3:25.77	
6	7	France	Jérémy Stravius (50.50); Jean Dencausse (58.67); Mehdy Metella (50.61); Clément Mignon (46.55)	3:26.33	
7	1	China	Xu Jiayu (50.43); Yan Zibei (57.59); Li Zhuhao (51.41); Lin Yongqing (47.44)	3:26.87	
	6	United States	Jacob Pebley (50.55); Cody Miller (56.46); Tom Shields; Blake Pieroni		DSQ
