= 2014 FINA World Swimming Championships (25 m) – Men's 100 metre butterfly =

Men's 100 metre butterfly at the 2014 FINA World Swimming Championships (25 m)
- Dates: 3 December (heats and semifinals); 4 December (final)
- Competitors: 96 from 77 nations
- Winning time: 48.44 WR

Medalists
gold medal	Chad le Clos	South Africa
silver medal	Tom Shields	United States
bronze medal	Tommaso D'Orsogna	Australia

The men's 100 metre butterfly competition of the 2014 FINA World Swimming Championships (25 m) was held on 3 December with the heats and the semifinals and 4 December with the final.

== Records ==
Prior to the competition, the existing world and championship records were as follows.

	Name	Nation	Time	Location	Date
World record	Yevgeny Korotyshkin	Russia	48.48	Berlin	15 November 2009
Championship record	Chad le Clos	South Africa	48.82	Istanbul	13 December 2012

The following records were established during the competition:

Date	Event	Name	Nation	Time	Record
4 December	Final	Chad le Clos	South Africa	48.44	WR

== Results ==
=== Heats ===
The heats were held at 11:50.

Rank	Heat	Lane	Name	Nationality	Time	Notes
1	8	5	Kosuke Hagino	Japan	49.83	Q
2	10	4	Chad le Clos	South Africa	50.35	Q
3	9	7	Ryan Lochte	United States	50.38	Q
4	10	2	Tommaso D'Orsogna	Australia	50.39	Q
5	9	4	Tom Shields	United States	50.43	Q
6	8	4	Yevgeny Korotyshkin	Russia	50.54	Q
7	8	6	David Morgan	Australia	50.61	Q
8	7	6	Albert Subirats	Venezuela	50.62	Q
9	9	6	Steffen Deibler	Germany	50.67	Q
10	10	5	Adam Barrett	Great Britain	50.72	Q
11	9	5	Marcos Macedo	Brazil	50.76	Q
12	10	8	Paweł Korzeniowski	Poland	50.79	Q
13	8	3	Nicholas Santos	Brazil	50.86	Q
14	10	6	Mehdy Metella	France	50.93	Q
15	9	3	Yauhen Tsurkin	Belarus	50.95	Q
16	6	6	Zhang Qibin	China	51.00	Q
17	8	2	Aleksandr Popkov	Russia	51.11	
17	9	8	Takuro Fujii	Japan	51.19	
19	7	2	Andreas Vazaios	Greece	51.31	
20	7	3	Jan Šefl	Czech Republic	51.38	
21	7	9	Sebastien Rousseau	South Africa	51.42	
22	10	7	Ivan Lenđer	Serbia	51.50	
23	8	7	Alexandru Coci	Romania	51.60	
24	8	1	Mario Todorović	Croatia	51.70	
25	10	3	Matteo Rivolta	Italy	51.73	
26	7	4	Viktor Bromer	Denmark	51.83	
27	7	8	Andriy Hovorov	Ukraine	51.85	
28	7	0	Tadas Duškinas	Lithuania	51.92	
28	9	2	Michał Poprawa	Poland	51.92	
30	10	9	Alexandre Haldemann	Switzerland	52.00	
31	10	1	Brett Fraser	Cayman Islands	52.08	
32	9	9	Benjamin Hockin	Paraguay	52.10	
33	9	0	Robert Žbogar	Slovenia	52.15	
34	10	0	Daniel Carranza	Mexico	52.19	
35	7	7	Louis Croenen	Belgium	52.35	
36	7	5	Sindri Jakobsson	Norway	52.43	
37	8	9	Bence Biczó	Hungary	52.52	
38	8	8	Riku Poytakivi	Finland	52.66	
39	8	0	Markus Gierke	Germany	52.69	
40	9	1	Wang Yuxin	China	52.78	
41	6	0	Norbert Szabó	Hungary	53.12	
42	7	1	Andres Montoya	Colombia	53.19	
43	5	3	Aleksey Derlyugov	Uzbekistan	53.33	
44	6	1	Max Abreu	Paraguay	53.41	
45	6	8	Ensar Hajder	Bosnia and Herzegovina	53.53	
46	6	3	Povilas Strazdas	Lithuania	53.65	
47	5	6	Teimuraz Kobakhidze	Georgia	53.67	
48	5	4	Islam Aslanov	Uzbekistan	53.85	
49	5	1	Anthonny Ralefy	Madagascar	54.40	
50	6	4	Ng Chun Nam Derick	Hong Kong	54.65	
51	5	2	Jessie Lacuna	Philippines	54.67	
51	6	9	Dhill Lee	Philippines	54.67	
53	6	5	Zuhayr Pigot	Suriname	54.68	
54	5	5	Joaquin Sepulveda	Chile	54.73	
55	6	2	Mark Hsu	Chinese Taipei	54.74	
56	6	7	Jugurtha Boumali	Algeria	55.24	
57	5	9	Ivan Andrianov	Azerbaijan	55.57	
58	3	5	Nguyễn Ngọc Huỳnh	Vietnam	55.66	
59	4	1	Aldo Castillo	Bolivia	55.77	
60	5	0	Peter Wetzlar	Zimbabwe	55.90	
61	3	3	Winter Heaven	Samoa	56.11	
62	5	8	Nico Campbell	Jamaica	56.37	
63	5	7	Eric Culver	Puerto Rico	56.67	
64	4	6	Jean Monteagudo	Peru	56.79	
65	4	2	Cherantha de Silva	Sri Lanka	56.82	
66	4	9	Oumar Touré	Mali	57.14	
67	4	8	Matthew Courtis	Barbados	57.27	
68	4	0	Dulguun Batsaikhan	Mongolia	57.27	
69	3	2	Valdo Valdo	Mozambique	58.20	
70	3	7	Colin Bensadon	Gibraltar	58.35	
71	4	4	Waleed Abdulrazzaq	Kuwait	58.36	
72	3	6	Stanford Kawale	Papua New Guinea	58.54	
73	4	5	Ali Al-Kaabi	United Arab Emirates	58.55	
74	3	9	Meli Malani	Fiji	58.63	
75	4	3	Jim Sanderson	Gibraltar	58.70	
76	4	7	Omar Hesham	Qatar	58.99	
77	2	5	Noah Mascoll-Gomes	Antigua and Barbuda	59.09	
78	3	1	González Leonardo	Honduras	59.66	
79	2	3	Abeiku Jackson	Ghana	59.94	
80	2	7	Miguel Mena	Nicaragua	1:00.16	
81	3	4	Franci Aleksi	Albania	1:00.34	
82	3	0	Ifeakachuku Nmor	Nigeria	1:00.49	
83	2	2	Gianluca Pasolini	San Marino	1:00.55	
84	2	8	Bobby Akunaii	Papua New Guinea	1:01.09	
85	2	4	Ahmed Al-Mutairy	Iraq	1:02.42	
86	2	6	Binald Mahmuti	Albania	1:04.03	
87	1	5	Giordan Harris	Marshall Islands	1:04.09	
88	3	8	Alex Sobers	Barbados	1:04.16	
89	2	0	Arnold Kisulo	Uganda	1:04.28	
90	2	1	Sylla Alassane	Ivory Coast	1:04.81	
91	2	9	Nikolas Sylvester	Saint Vincent and the Grenadines	1:05.19	
92	1	6	Tommy Imazu	Guam	1:06.84	
93	1	4	Mohamed Adnan	Maldives	1:08.13	
94	1	2	Tanner Poppe	Guam	1:08.30	
95	1	7	Shawn Dingilius	Palau	1:08.76	
96	1	3	Idriss Mutankabandi	Burundi	1:10.18	

=== Semifinals ===
The semifinals were held at 18:59.

==== Semifinal 1 ====
Rank	Lane	Name	Nationality	Time	Notes
1	4	Chad le Clos	South Africa	49.25	Q
2	5	Tommaso D'Orsogna	Australia	49.69	Q
3	3	Yevgeny Korotyshkin	Russia	50.26	Q
4	2	Adam Barrett	Great Britain	50.35	
5	7	Paweł Korzeniowski	Poland	50.40	
6	1	Mehdy Metella	France	50.43	
7	8	Zhang Qibin	China	50.74	
8	6	Albert Subirats	Venezuela	51.06	

==== Semifinal 2 ====
Rank	Lane	Name	Nationality	Time	Notes
1	3	Tom Shields	United States	49.91	Q
2	7	Marcos Macedo	Brazil	50.03	Q
3	4	Kosuke Hagino	Japan	50.07	Q
4	5	Ryan Lochte	United States	50.09	Q
5	8	Yauhen Tsurkin	Belarus	50.14	Q
6	2	Steffen Deibler	Germany	50.41	
7	1	Nicholas Santos	Brazil	50.79	
8	6	David Morgan	Australia	50.96	

=== Final ===
The final was held at 19:31.

Rank	Lane	Name	Nationality	Time	Notes
1st place, gold medalist(s)	4	Chad le Clos	South Africa	48.44	WR
2nd place, silver medalist(s)	3	Tom Shields	United States	48.99	
3rd place, bronze medalist(s)	5	Tommaso D'Orsogna	Australia	49.60	
4	8	Yevgeny Korotyshkin	Russia	49.88	
5	2	Kosuke Hagino	Japan	49.91	
6	1	Yauhen Tsurkin	Belarus	49.99	
7	7	Ryan Lochte	United States	50.23	
8	6	Marcos Macedo	Brazil	50.47	
