= Swimming at the 2018 European Aquatics Championships – Men's 100 metre butterfly =

Men's 100 metre butterfly at the 2018 European Aquatics Championships
- Venue: Tollcross International Swimming Centre
- Dates: 8 August (heats and semifinals); 9 August (final)
- Competitors: 59 from 31 nations
- Winning time: 50.64

Medalists
gold medal	Piero Codia	Italy
silver medal	Mehdy Metella	France
bronze medal	James Guy	Great Britain

The Men's 100 metre butterfly competition of the 2018 European Aquatics Championships was held on 8 and 9 August 2018.

== Records ==
Prior to the competition, the existing world and championship records were as follows.

	Name	Nation	Time	Location	Date
World record	Michael Phelps	United States	49.82	Rome	1 August 2009
European record	Milorad Čavić	Serbia	49.95	Rome	1 Aug 2009
Championship record	László Cseh	Hungary	50.86	London	21 May 2016

The following new records were set during this competition.

Date	Event	Name	Nationality	Time	Record
9 August	Final	Piero Codia	Italy	50.64	CR

== Results ==
=== Heats ===
The heats were started on 8 August at 09:35.

Rank	Heat	Lane	Name	Nationality	Time	Notes
1	6	5	Piero Codia	Italy	51.59	Q
2	6	4	James Guy	Great Britain	51.75	Q
3	7	3	Konrad Czerniak	Poland	51.84	Q
4	5	4	László Cseh	Hungary	51.92	Q
5	7	4	Kristóf Milák	Hungary	52.04	Q
6	5	5	Egor Kuimov	Russia	52.16	Q
7	7	5	Mehdy Metella	France	52.32	Q
8	5	6	Yauhen Tsurkin	Belarus	52.42	Q
9	6	7	Mathys Goosen	Netherlands	52.48	Q
10	6	2	Marius Kusch	Germany	52.51	Q
11	7	6	Aleksandr Sadovnikov	Russia	52.53	Q
12	7	7	Joeri Verlinden	Netherlands	52.68	Q
13	5	2	Matteo Rivolta	Italy	52.69	Q
14	4	6	Liubomyr Lemeshko	Ukraine	52.71	Q
15	5	3	Philip Heintz	Germany	52.76	Q
16	6	3	Jan Świtkowski	Poland	52.83	Q
17	5	1	Viktor Bromer	Denmark	52.87	
18	4	5	Andreas Vazaios	Greece	52.89	
19	6	6	Federico Burdisso	Italy	52.90	
20	7	1	Kaan Türker Ayar	Turkey	53.00	
21	4	2	Jacob Peters	Great Britain	53.02	
22	4	4	Deividas Margevičius	Lithuania	53.15	
23	6	1	Ümitcan Güreş	Turkey	53.21	
24	7	2	Andriy Khloptsov	Ukraine	53.22	
25	5	8	Brendan Hyland	Ireland	53.37	
25	4	3	Noè Ponti	Switzerland	53.37	
27	7	9	Louis Croenen	Belgium	53.39	
28	5	9	Kregor Zirk	Estonia	53.46	
29	6	9	Danas Rapšys	Lithuania	53.57	
30	3	8	Daniel Zaitsev	Estonia	53.61	
31	4	7	Simon Sjödin	Sweden	53.64	
32	6	8	Pierre Henry	France	53.68	
33	4	8	Nans Roch	France	53.71	
34	5	7	Michal Chudy	Poland	53.81	
35	3	6	Diogo Carvalho	Portugal	53.83	
35	7	8	Ramon Klenz	Germany	53.83	
37	6	0	Antani Ivanov	Bulgaria	53.86	
38	7	0	Jan Šefl	Czech Republic	53.98	
39	2	8	Gabriel Lópes	Portugal	54.16	
40	5	0	Marcus Schlesinger	Israel	54.19	
41	4	1	Riku Poeytaekivi	Finland	54.20	
42	4	0	Petr Novák	Czech Republic	54.39	
43	2	2	Nikita Korolev	Russia	54.46	
43	3	5	Niko Mäkelä	Finland	54.46	
45	3	3	Bence Biczó	Hungary	54.53	
46	2	5	Cevin Siim	Estonia	54.71	
47	2	3	Ádám Halás	Slovakia	54.79	
48	3	4	Berk Özkul	Turkey	54.85	
49	2	6	Xaver Gschwentner	Austria	54.95	
50	2	4	İlker Altınbilek	Turkey	55.01	
51	3	2	Sergey Kuznetsov	Finland	55.19	
52	2	7	Paul Espernberger	Austria	55.37	
53	2	1	Filip Zelić	Croatia	55.41	
54	3	7	Simon Bucher	Austria	55.42	
55	3	0	Armin Lelle	Estonia	55.73	
56	2	0	Teimuraz Kobakhidze	Georgia	56.01	
57	3	1	Julien Henx	Luxembourg	58.16	
58	1	3	Ruben Gharibyan	Armenia	1:02.02	
59	1	4	Dijon Kadriju	Kosovo	1:02.55	
	1	5	Teemu Vuorela	Finland	Did not start	
	3	9	Markus Lie	Norway	Did not start	

=== Semifinals ===
The semifinals were started on 8 August at 17:17.

==== Semifinal 1 ====
Rank	Lane	Name	Nationality	Time	Notes
1	5	László Cseh	Hungary	51.65	Q
2	4	James Guy	Great Britain	51.78	Q
3	3	Egor Kuimov	Russia	51.95	Q
4	7	Joeri Verlinden	Netherlands	52.16	
5	6	Yauhen Tsurkin	Belarus	52.21	
6	2	Marius Kusch	Germany	52.23	
7	1	Liubomyr Lemeshko	Ukraine	52.34	
8	8	Jan Świtkowski	Poland	53.23	

==== Semifinal 2 ====
Rank	Lane	Name	Nationality	Time	Notes
1	7	Aleksandr Sadovnikov	Russia	51.67	Q
2	5	Konrad Czerniak	Poland	51.74	Q
3	3	Kristóf Milák	Hungary	51.76	Q
4	6	Mehdy Metella	France	51.97	Q
5	4	Piero Codia	Italy	52.02	Q
6	8	Philip Heintz	Germany	52.41	
7	2	Mathys Goosen	Netherlands	52.58	
8	1	Matteo Rivolta	Italy	53.42	

=== Final ===
The final was started on 9 August at 17:00.

Rank	Lane	Name	Nationality	Time	Notes
1st place, gold medalist(s)	8	Piero Codia	Italy	50.64	CR
2nd place, silver medalist(s)	1	Mehdy Metella	France	51.24	
3rd place, bronze medalist(s)	2	James Guy	Great Britain	51.42	
4	6	Kristóf Milák	Hungary	51.51	
5	7	Egor Kuimov	Russia	51.65	
6	3	Konrad Czerniak	Poland	51.72	
7	5	Aleksandr Sadovnikov	Russia	51.81	
8	4	László Cseh	Hungary	51.84	
