= 2018 FINA World Swimming Championships (25 m) – Men's 50 metre butterfly =

Men's 50 metre butterfly at the 2018 FINA World Swimming Championships (25 m)
- Venue: Hangzhou Sports Park Stadium
- Dates: 14 December (heats and semifinals); 15 December (final)
- Competitors: 104
- Winning time: 21.81 CR

Medalists
| gold medal | Nicholas Santos | Brazil |
| silver medal | Chad le Clos | South Africa |
| bronze medal | Dylan Carter | Trinidad and Tobago |

The Men's 50 metre butterfly competition of the 2018 FINA World Swimming Championships (25 m) was held on 14 and 15 December 2018 at the Hangzhou Olympic Sports Center.

== Records ==
Prior to the competition, the existing world and championship records were as follows.

| | Name | Nation | Time | Location | Date |
|---|---|---|---|---|---|
| World record | Nicholas Santos | Brazil | 21.75 | Budapest | 6 October 2018 |
| Championship record | Chad le Clos | South Africa | 21.95 | Doha | 6 December 2014 |

The following new records were set during this competition:

| Date | Event | Name | Nation | Time | Record |
|---|---|---|---|---|---|
| 16 December | Final | Nicholas Santos | Brazil | 21.81 | CR |

== Results ==
=== Heats ===
The heats were started at 9:52.

| Rank | Heat | Lane | Name | Nationality | Time | Notes |
|---|---|---|---|---|---|---|
| 1 | 11 | 4 | Nicholas Santos | Brazil | 22.41 | Q |
| 2 | 9 | 3 | Dylan Carter | Trinidad and Tobago | 22.53 | Q |
| 3 | 11 | 6 | Marius Kusch | Germany | 22.59 | Q |
| 4 | 10 | 4 | Chad le Clos | South Africa | 22.67 | Q |
| 5 | 10 | 3 | Takaya Yasue | Japan | 22.78 | Q |
| 6 | 9 | 6 | Mikhail Vekovishchev | Russia | 22.79 | Q |
| 6 | 10 | 2 | Ryan Coetzee | South Africa | 22.79 | Q |
| 8 | 10 | 5 | Yauhen Tsurkin | Belarus | 22.80 | Q |
| 9 | 9 | 5 | Takeshi Kawamoto | Japan | 22.83 | Q |
| 10 | 9 | 1 | Mehdy Metella | France | 22.86 | Q |
| 11 | 11 | 5 | Michael Andrew | United States | 22.93 | Q |
| 12 | 11 | 3 | Umitcan Gures | Turkey | 22.96 | Q |
| 13 | 10 | 1 | Matteo Rivolta | Italy | 23.02 | Q |
| 13 | 10 | 9 | Niksa Stojkovski | Norway | 23.02 | Q |
| 15 | 10 | 7 | Piero Codia | Italy | 23.03 | Q |
| 16 | 9 | 7 | Matheus Santana | Brazil | 23.08 | QSO |
| 16 | 11 | 7 | Riku Pöytäkivi | Finland | 23.08 | QSO |
| 18 | 10 | 6 | Deividas Margevičius | Lithuania | 23.10 | |
| 19 | 11 | 0 | Roman Shevliakov | Russia | 23.13 | |
| 20 | 9 | 0 | Hryhory Pekarski | Belarus | 23.14 | |
| 20 | 11 | 1 | Daniel Zaitsev | Estonia | 23.14 | |
| 22 | 11 | 8 | Konrad Czerniak | Poland | 23.19 | |
| 23 | 9 | 2 | Li Zhuhao | China | 23.21 | |
| 24 | 8 | 4 | Kristian Golomeev | Greece | 23.24 | |
| 25 | 11 | 9 | Damian Wierling | Germany | 23.26 | |
| 26 | 7 | 7 | Adilbek Mussin | Kazakhstan | 23.35 | |
| 26 | 11 | 2 | Jesse Puts | Netherlands | 23.35 | |
| 28 | 8 | 2 | Ben Hockin | Paraguay | 23.37 | |
| 29 | 8 | 3 | Cameron Jones | Australia | 23.40 | |
| 30 | 7 | 2 | Antani Ivanov | Bulgaria | 23.42 | |
| 31 | 9 | 8 | Wang Peng | China | 23.48 | |
| 32 | 8 | 5 | Catalin Ungur | Romania | 23.59 | |
| 33 | 8 | 6 | Julien Henx | Luxembourg | 23.63 | |
| 34 | 9 | 9 | Berk Ozkul | Turkey | 23.74 | |
| 35 | 8 | 0 | Adam Halas | Slovakia | 23.76 | |
| 36 | 8 | 1 | Heiko Gigler | Austria | 23.77 | |
| 37 | 7 | 0 | Alexandre Perreault | Canada | 23.80 | |
| 38 | 7 | 4 | Manuel Leuthard | Switzerland | 23.89 | |
| 39 | 6 | 3 | Esnaider Reales | Colombia | 23.96 | |
| 40 | 7 | 5 | Sajan Prakash | India | 23.97 | |
| 41 | 6 | 5 | Chao Man Hou | Macau | 24.04 | |
| 42 | 6 | 7 | Oliver Elliot | Chile | 24.06 | |
| 43 | 7 | 3 | Adi Mešetović | Bosnia and Herzegovina | 24.07 | |
| 44 | 8 | 8 | Christoffer Carlsen | Sweden | 24.17 | |
| 45 | 7 | 8 | Ralph Goveia | Zambia | 24.18 | |
| 45 | 10 | 0 | Andriy Khloptsov | Ukraine | 24.18 | |
| 47 | 6 | 4 | Ali Khalafalla | Egypt | 24.22 | |
| 47 | 8 | 7 | Cherantha de Silva | Sri Lanka | 24.22 | |
| 49 | 8 | 9 | Andrew James Digby | Thailand | 24.23 | |
| 50 | 6 | 9 | Abbas Qali | Kuwait | 24.43 | |
| 51 | 7 | 9 | Anthony Barbar | Lebanon | 24.48 | |
| 52 | 2 | 4 | Amini Fonua | Tonga | 24.50 | NR |
| 53 | 6 | 6 | Artur Barseghyan | Armenia | 24.55 | NR |
| 54 | 2 | 1 | Philip Adejumo | Nigeria | 24.58 | NR |
| 54 | 6 | 8 | N'Nhyn Fernander | Bahamas | 24.58 | |
| 56 | 5 | 4 | Bryan Alvaréz | Costa Rica | 24.73 | |
| 57 | 6 | 0 | Rafael Barreto | Philippines | 24.74 | |
| 57 | 6 | 1 | Noah Al-Khulaifi | Qatar | 24.74 | |
| 59 | 6 | 2 | Lin Chieh-liang | Chinese Taipei | 24.77 | |
| 60 | 2 | 0 | Jose Quintanilla | Bolivia | 24.86 | |
| 61 | 5 | 5 | Yousif Bu-Arish | Saudi Arabia | 25.10 | |
| 62 | 5 | 2 | Bernat Lomero | Andorra | 25.17 | NR |
| 63 | 5 | 3 | Vladislav Shuliko | Kyrgyzstan | 25.20 | NR |
| 64 | 2 | 5 | Md Mahamudun Nobi Nahid | Bangladesh | 25.25 | |
| 65 | 5 | 7 | Malcolm Richardson | Cook Islands | 25.49 | |
| 66 | 5 | 0 | Jayhan Odlum-Smith | Saint Lucia | 25.66 | |
| 67 | 2 | 8 | Mohammed Isam Sadeq Kazan | Iraq | 25.95 | |
| 68 | 4 | 3 | Nabeel Hatoum | Palestine | 26.10 | |
| 68 | 4 | 6 | R.A.B Mohamed | Kenya | 26.10 | |
| 70 | 1 | 6 | Ali Alkaabi | United Arab Emirates | 26.16 | |
| 71 | 4 | 2 | Collins Saliboko | Tanzania | 26.19 | |
| 72 | 5 | 8 | Davidson Vincent | Haiti | 26.38 | NR |
| 73 | 5 | 9 | Tryfonas Hadjichristoforou | Cyprus | 26.45 | |
| 74 | 4 | 4 | Isiaka Irankunda | Rwanda | 26.46 | |
| 75 | 4 | 5 | Dajenel Williams | Grenada | 26.52 | |
| 76 | 4 | 7 | Troy Pina | Cape Verde | 26.73 | |
| 77 | 2 | 3 | A Ahmed Ali Yusuf | Brunei | 26.85 | |
| 78 | 2 | 9 | Duran Alfonso | Honduras | 27.02 | |
| 79 | 1 | 2 | Nabil Ahmed Saleh | Uganda | 27.54 | |
| 80 | 4 | 1 | P.Y.D Poku-Dwumoh | Ghana | 27.68 | |
| 81 | 2 | 2 | Carel Irakoze | Burundi | 27.72 | |
| 82 | 2 | 6 | Fakhriddin Madkamov | Tajikistan | 27.73 | |
| 83 | 3 | 7 | Abobakr Abass | Sudan | 27.74 | |
| 84 | 3 | 0 | Anubhav Subba | Nepal | 27.95 | |
| 85 | 3 | 3 | Antonio Andrew Rodrigues | Guyana | 28.21 | |
| 86 | 4 | 8 | Simanga Dlamini | Eswatini | 28.54 | |
| 87 | 1 | 5 | Ratha Phin | Cambodia | 28.85 | |
| 88 | 3 | 6 | Achala Gekabel | Ethiopia | 29.22 | |
| 89 | 4 | 9 | Nelson Batallones | Northern Mariana Islands | 29.58 | |
| 90 | 3 | 1 | Albachir Mouctar | Niger | 29.88 | |
| 91 | 4 | 0 | Slava Sihannouvong | Laos | 29.99 | |
| 92 | 3 | 8 | Jack Parlee | Turks and Caicos Islands | 30.21 | |
| 93 | 3 | 5 | Jefferson Kpanou | Benin | 30.79 | |
| 94 | 3 | 9 | Joshua Wyse | Sierra Leone | 31.59 | |
| 95 | 3 | 4 | Daniel Ranis | Marshall Islands | 31.73 | |
| 96 | 2 | 7 | Ian Salaka | Malawi | 32.62 | |
| 97 | 1 | 4 | Jessy Misak | Vanuatu | 33.19 | |
| 98 | 1 | 3 | H.T.H. Baidar | Yemen | 34.20 | |
| | 5 | 6 | Thibaut Danho | Ivory Coast | DNS | |
| | 7 | 1 | Bradlee Ashby | New Zealand | DNS | |
| | 7 | 6 | Shane Ryan | Ireland | DNS | |
| | 10 | 8 | Caeleb Dressel | United States | DNS | |
| | 3 | 2 | Houssein Ibrahim | Djibouti | DSQ | |
| | 5 | 1 | Ljupcho Angelovski | Macedonia | DSQ | |

==== Swim-off ====
The swim-off was held on 14 December at 11:07.

| Rank | Lane | Name | Nationality | Time | Notes |
|---|---|---|---|---|---|
| 1 | 5 | Riku Pöytäkivi | Finland | 22.71 | Q |
| 2 | 4 | Matheus Santana | Brazil | 23.18 | |

=== Semifinals ===
The semifinals were held at 19:33.

==== Semifinal 1 ====
| Rank | Lane | Name | Nationality | Time | Notes |
|---|---|---|---|---|---|
| 1 | 5 | Chad le Clos | South Africa | 22.34 | Q |
| 2 | 3 | Mikhail Vekovishchev | Russia | 22.56 | Q |
| 3 | 4 | Dylan Carter | Trinidad and Tobago | 22.62 | Q |
| 4 | 7 | Umitcan Gures | Turkey | 22.82 | |
| 5 | 2 | Mehdy Metella | France | 22.83 | |
| 6 | 6 | Yauhen Tsurkin | Belarus | 22.84 | |
| 7 | 8 | Riku Pöytäkivi | Finland | 22.94 | |
| 8 | 1 | Niksa Stojkovski | Norway | 23.19 | |

==== Semifinal 2 ====
| Rank | Lane | Name | Nationality | Time | Notes |
|---|---|---|---|---|---|
| 1 | 4 | Nicholas Santos | Brazil | 21.96 | Q |
| 2 | 5 | Marius Kusch | Germany | 22.44 | Q |
| 3 | 3 | Takaya Yasue | Japan | 22.52 | Q |
| 4 | 2 | Takeshi Kawamoto | Japan | 22.74 | Q |
| 5 | 6 | Ryan Coetzee | South Africa | 22.75 | Q |
| 6 | 8 | Piero Codia | Italy | 22.76 | NR |
| 7 | 1 | Matteo Rivolta | Italy | 22.79 | |
| 8 | 7 | Michael Andrew | United States | 22.81 | |

=== Final ===
The final was held at 19:41.

| Rank | Lane | Name | Nationality | Time | Notes |
|---|---|---|---|---|---|
| 1st place, gold medalist(s) | 4 | Nicholas Santos | Brazil | 21.81 | CR |
| 2nd place, silver medalist(s) | 5 | Chad le Clos | South Africa | 21.97 | |
| 3rd place, bronze medalist(s) | 7 | Dylan Carter | Trinidad and Tobago | 22.38 | NR |
| 4 | 3 | Marius Kusch | Germany | 22.40 | |
| 5 | 1 | Takeshi Kawamoto | Japan | 22.50 | |
| 6 | 2 | Mikhail Vekovishchev | Russia | 22.60 | |
| 6 | 6 | Takaya Yasue | Japan | 22.60 | |
| 8 | 8 | Ryan Coetzee | South Africa | 22.88 | |
