= 2024 World Aquatics Swimming Championships (25 m) – Men's 100 metre butterfly =

Swimming competition

Men's 100 metre butterfly at the 2024 World Aquatics Swimming Championships (25 m)
- Venue: Duna Arena
- Location: Budapest, Hungary
- Dates: 13 December (heats and semifinals); 14 December (final)
- Competitors: 71 from 62 nations
- Winning time: 47.71 WR

Medalists
gold medal	Noè Ponti	Switzerland
silver medal	Maxime Grousset	France
bronze medal	Matthew Temple	Australia

The men's 100 metre butterfly event at the 2024 World Aquatics Swimming Championships (25 m) was held from 13 to 14 December 2024 at the Duna Arena in Budapest, Hungary.

== Records ==
Prior to the competition, the existing world and championship records were as follows:

World record	Caeleb Dressel (USA)	47.78	Budapest, Hungary	21 November 2020
Competition record	Chad le Clos (RSA)	48.08	Windsor, Canada	8 December 2016

The following record was established during the competition:

Date	Round	Name	Nationality	Time	Record
14 December	Final	Noè Ponti	Switzerland	47.71	WR

== Background ==
Switzerland’s Noè Ponti entered the event as the top seed and third-fastest performer in history, having set a personal best of 48.40 during the World Cup. The Netherlands’ Nyls Korstanje followed, having won silver behind Ponti at each of the World Cup stops and set a personal best of 48.99. South Africa’s Chad le Clos, the 2022 world champion and former world record holder, posted 49.50 in Singapore but placed fifth behind Singapore’s Teong Tzen Wei (49.37) and Australia’s Matthew Temple (49.49). France’s Maxime Grousset, the 2023 world long-course champion, entered with a 48.94 from the European Championships and was seeded third. Russian athletes Andrei Minakov (49.71) and Roman Shevliakov (49.81) were also in the top eight, competing as neutral athletes. Canada’s Ilya Kharun, the 2022 runner-up and Olympic bronze medallist, was seeded 16th with a long-course time of 50.45 but was expected to improve significantly. The USA’s Dare Rose, also entered with an LCM time, was another potential threat despite recent inconsistency.

SwimSwam predicted Ponti would win, Kharun would take second, and Korstanje would take third.

== Results ==
=== Heats ===
The heats were started on 13 December at 10:26.

Rank	Heat	Lane	Name	Nationality	Time	Notes
1	8	7	Ilya Kharun	Canada	49.17	Q
2	7	4	Maxime Grousset	France	49.22	Q
3	8	4	Noè Ponti	Switzerland	49.35	Q
4	8	8	Hubert Kós	Hungary	49.36	Q
5	5	1	Youssef Ramadan	Egypt	49.37	Q, NR
6	7	5	Matthew Temple	Australia	49.45	Q
7	7	7	Dare Rose	United States	49.55	Q
8	8	3	Andrey Minakov	Neutral Athletes B	49.58	Q
9	7	6	Simone Stefanì	Italy	49.81	Q
10	7	3	Roman Shevliakov	Neutral Athletes B	49.97	Q
11	7	1	Simon Bucher	Austria	49.98	Q
12	6	5	Chad le Clos	South Africa	50.04	Q
13	6	6	Clément Secchi	France	50.12	Q
13	8	2	Takaya Yasue	Japan	50.12	Q
15	6	2	Michele Busa	Italy	50.15	Q
15	8	5	Teong Tzen Wei	Singapore	50.15	Q
17	6	4	Nyls Korstanje	Netherlands	50.23	R
18	6	3	Jacob Peters	Great Britain	50.30	R
19	6	1	Đurđe Matić	Serbia	50.34	
20	8	0	Zach Harting	United States	50.36	
21	6	7	Jakub Majerski	Poland	50.42	
22	5	4	Adilbek Mussin	Kazakhstan	50.55	NR
22	7	0	Finlay Knox	Canada	50.55	
24	6	8	Nicolas Albiero	Brazil	50.63	
25	4	3	Jorge Otaiza	Venezuela	50.67	
26	6	9	Joshua Gammon	Great Britain	50.68	
27	5	3	Adrian Jaśkiewicz	Poland	50.69	
28	8	1	Grigori Pekarski	Neutral Athletes A	50.74	
29	7	2	Ruard van Renen	South Africa	50.91	
30	7	8	Maro Miknić	Croatia	51.02	
31	7	9	Kaii Winkler	Germany	51.32	
32	5	6	Denis Popescu	Romania	51.44	
33	8	6	Daniel Gracík	Czech Republic	51.45	
34	5	5	Maxim Skazobtsov	Kazakhstan	51.50	
34	8	9	Mario Mollá	Spain	51.50	
36	5	7	Alex Ahtiainen	Estonia	51.60	
37	5	8	Li Taiyu	China	51.61	
38	5	9	Arsenii Kovalov	Ukraine	51.64	
39	6	0	Emre Gürdenli	Turkey	52.21	
40	4	5	Bryan Leong Xin Ren	Malaysia	52.42	
41	5	0	Ralph Koo	Hong Kong	52.53	
42	4	7	Diego Balbi	Peru	52.80	
43	4	2	Kenan Dračić	Bosnia and Herzegovina	52.83	NR
44	3	5	Steven Aimable	Senegal	52.91	NR
45	3	3	Samuel Košťál	Slovakia	53.06	
46	3	0	Colins Obi Ebingha	Nigeria	53.14	
47	4	8	Christopher Elson	New Zealand	53.16	
48	3	4	Benjamín Schnapp	Chile	53.31	NR
49	4	6	Miloš Milenković	Montenegro	53.36	
50	4	9	Abeku Jackson	Ghana	53.38	
51	4	4	Birnir Freyr Hálfdánarson	Iceland	53.41	
52	4	1	Elijah Daley	Bermuda	53.52	NR
53	3	6	Christian Jerome	Haiti	54.24	
54	3	7	Ethan Stubbs-Green	Antigua and Barbuda	54.84	
55	3	9	Nathaniel Thomas	Jamaica	54.93	
56	3	8	Jovan Jankovski	North Macedonia	55.08	
57	3	2	Tameea El-Hamayda	Qatar	55.18	
58	2	4	Collins Saliboko	Tanzania	55.45	
59	2	9	Hashim Haba	Iraq	55.49	
60	3	1	Mohamad Eyad Masoud	ART	55.89	
61	2	5	Jefferson Kpanou	Benin	56.33	
62	1	3	Daniyal Hatim	Pakistan	56.69	NR
63	1	5	Salem Sabt	United Arab Emirates	56.78	
64	2	0	Jayden Loran	Curaçao	57.09	
65	2	1	Mskm Al-Kulaibi	Oman	58.43	NR
66	2	7	Soud Alenezi	Kuwait	58.49	
67	2	3	Jaden Francis	Guam	59.47	
68	2	6	Kinley Lhendup	Bhutan	59.79	
69	2	2	Mohamed Rihan Shiham	Maldives	59.94	
70	1	4	Jonathan Bardales Essien	Saint Kitts and Nevis	1:00.32	
71	2	8	Charlie Gibbons	Palau	1:01.95	
	4	0	Isak Brisenfeldt	Faroe Islands	Did not start	
	5	2	Max McCusker	Ireland	Did not start	

=== Semifinals ===
The semifinals were started on 13 December at 18:35.

Rank	Heat	Lane	Name	Nationality	Time	Notes
1	2	5	Noè Ponti	Switzerland	48.89	Q
2	1	4	Maxime Grousset	France	48.99	Q
3	1	3	Matthew Temple	Australia	49.01	Q
4	2	8	Michele Busa	Italy	49.11	Q
5	2	6	Dare Rose	United States	49.14	Q
6	1	6	Andrey Minakov	Neutral Athletes B	49.19	Q
7	2	2	Simone Stefanì	Italy	49.28	Q
8	2	7	Simon Bucher	Austria	49.29	Q
9	2	3	Youssef Ramadan	Egypt	49.31	R, NR
10	2	4	Ilya Kharun	Canada	49.39	R
11	1	7	Chad le Clos	South Africa	49.41	
12	1	5	Hubert Kós	Hungary	49.47	
13	1	8	Teong Tzen Wei	Singapore	49.57	
14	1	1	Takaya Yasue	Japan	50.01	
15	1	2	Roman Shevliakov	Neutral Athletes B	50.12	
16	2	1	Clément Secchi	France	50.13	

=== Final ===
The final was held on 14 December at 17:40.

Rank	Lane	Name	Nationality	Time	Notes
1st place, gold medalist(s)	4	Noè Ponti	Switzerland	47.71	WR
2nd place, silver medalist(s)	5	Maxime Grousset	France	48.57	NR
3rd place, bronze medalist(s)	3	Matthew Temple	Australia	48.71	
4	6	Michele Busa	Italy	49.08	
5	8	Simon Bucher	Austria	49.19	
6	7	Andrey Minakov	Neutral Athletes B	49.21	
7	1	Simone Stefanì	Italy	49.29	
8	2	Dare Rose	United States	49.37	
