= Thint Myaat =

Burmese swimmer

Personal information
- Born: April 14, 2002 (age 24)

Sport
- Sport: Swimming

Thint Myaat (born April 14, 2002) is a Burmese swimmer. He competed at the 2016 Summer Olympics in the men's 100 metre butterfly event; his time of 1:02.54 in the heats did not qualify him for the semifinals.
