= Marcos Macedo =

Brazilian swimmer (born 1990)

Personal information
- Full name: Marcos Antônio Costa Ferreira de Macedo
- Nationality: Brazil
- Born: 9 September 1990 (age 35) Natal, Rio Grande do Norte, Brazil
- Height: 1.89 m (6 ft 2 in)
- Weight: 85 kg (187 lb)

Sport
- Sport: Swimming
- Strokes: Butterfly
- Club: Minas TC
Medal record
Men's swimming
Representing Brazil
World Championships (SC)
Gold medal – first place	2014 Doha	4×100 m medley
Universiade
Silver medal – second place	2011 Shenzhen	4×100 m freestyle
World Junior Championships
Bronze medal – third place	2008 Monterrey	4×100 m freestyle

Marco Antônio Costa Ferreira de Macedo (born 9 September 1990 in Natal) is a Brazilian competitive swimmer. is a Brazilian professional swimmer. He currently competes for the Fiat/Minas team. Marcos won the 4 × 100 m medley relay in the 2014 World Swimming Championship (short course).

== International career ==
=== 2008–12 ===
He won the bronze medal in the 4×100-metre freestyle at the 2008 FINA Youth World Swimming Championships in Monterrey.

At the 2011 World Aquatics Championships in Shanghai, China, Macedo finished 9th in the 4×100-metre freestyle. At the 2011 Summer Universiade in Shenzhen, China, he got a silver medal in the 4×100-metre freestyle relay.

=== 2013–16 ===
Macedo was part of the Brazilian delegation that finished in the first place the medal chart of the World Swimming Championship (short course) in Doha, with 7 golds, 1 silver and two bronzes (10 medals total). Marcos won the gold medal in the 4 × 100 m relay, in the team also composed by César Cielo, Guilherme Guido, and Felipe França Silva. He swam the butterfly course in 49.63, with team's total time of 3:21.14. He also qualified for the final on the men's 100 metre butterfly, and finished in 8th, 50.47.

=== 2016 Summer Olympics ===
At the 2016 Summer Olympics, Macedo finished 34th in the Men's 100 metre butterfly.
