= Kengo Ida =

Japanese swimmer (born 1991)

Kenga Ida
Personal information
- Nationality: Japanese
- Born: 20 August 1991 (age 33)

Sport
- Sport: Swimming

Kenga Ida (born 20 August 1991) is a Japanese swimmer. He competed in the men's 100 metre butterfly event at the 2018 FINA World Swimming Championships (25 m), in Hangzhou, China.
