= Andrey Shabasov =

Russian swimmer

Medal record

Men's swimming

Representing Russia

World Championships (SC)
| Gold medal – first place | 2016 Windsor | 4×50 m medley |
| Gold medal – first place | 2016 Windsor | 4×100 m medley |
| Silver medal – second place | 2016 Windsor | 100 m backstroke |
| Silver medal – second place | 2018 Hangzhou | 4×100 m medley |

Andrey Dmitrievich Shabasov (Russian: Андрей Дмитриевич Шабасов; born 20 June 1994) is a Russian swimmer. He competed at the 2016 Summer Olympics in the men's 200 metre backstroke event; his time of 1:56.84 in the semifinals did not qualify him for the final.
