= List of Omani records in swimming =

The Omani records in swimming are the fastest ever performances of swimmers from Oman, which are recognised and ratified by the Oman Swimming Association.

All records were set in finals unless noted otherwise.

== Long Course (50 m) ==
=== Men ===
Event	Time		Name	Club	Date	Meet	Location	Ref
50 m freestyle	23.90	h	Issa Al-Adawi	Oman	25 September 2019	Asian Age Group Championships	Bangalore, India	
100 m freestyle	51.81	h	Issa Al-Adawi	Oman	27 July 2021	Olympic Games	Tokyo, Japan	
200 m freestyle	1:58.19	h	Issa Al-Adawi	Oman	19 August 2018	Asian Games	Jakarta, Indonesia	
400 m freestyle	4:11.22		Issa Al-Adawi	Oman	August 2016	GCC Championships	Dammam, Saudi Arabia	
800 m freestyle	8:45.49		Issa Al-Adawi	Oman	18 May 2022	GCC Games	Kuwait City, Kuwait	
1500 m freestyle	17:14.88		Issa Al-Adawi	Oman	August 2016	GCC Championships	Dammam, Saudi Arabia	
50 m backstroke	28.79		Hussain Taha	Nautilus	11 October 2025	Omani Cup	Muscat, Oman	
100 m backstroke	1:00.89		Hussain Taha	Nautilus	4 January 2025	Nautilus Invitational Meet	Muscat, Oman	
200 m backstroke	2:15.39		Hussain Taha	Nautilus	30 January 2026	Nautilus Invitational Meet	Muscat, Oman	
50 m breaststroke	29.32	=	Hussain Taha	Oman	28 August 2025	Arab Championships	Casablanca, Morocco	
50 m breaststroke	29.32	h, =	Hussain Taha	Nautilus	3 April 2026	Dubai International Aquatic Championships	Dubai, United Arab Emirates	
100 m breaststroke	1:04.15		Hussain Taha	Nautilus	4 April 2026	Dubai International Aquatic Championships	Dubai, United Arab Emirates	
200 m breaststroke	2:25.61		Hussain Taha	Oman	22 January 2026	GCC Championships	Abu Dhabi, United Arab Emirates	
50 m butterfly	27.02		Hussain Taha	Nautilus	4 January 2025	Nautilus New Year's Opener	Muscat, Oman	
100 m butterfly	1:01.18	h	Abdulrahman Al-Kulaibi	Oman	28 July 2023	World Championships	Fukuoka, Japan	
200 m butterfly	2:16.06	h	Abdulrahman Al-Kulaibi	Oman	19 August 2018	Asian Games	Jakarta, Indonesia	
200 m individual medley	2:09.25		Hussain Taha	Nautilus	3 April 2026	Dubai International Aquatic Championships	Dubai, United Arab Emirates	
400 m individual medley	4:43.66		Hussain Taha	Oman	22 January 2026	GCC Championships	Abu Dhabi, United Arab Emirates	
4×100 m freestyle relay	3:36.15			Oman	18 May 2022	GCC Games	Kuwait City, Kuwait	
4×200 m freestyle relay	8:06.28			Oman	19 May 2022	GCC Games	Kuwait City, Kuwait	
4×100 m medley relay	4:28.09	h	Aiman Al-Qasmi (1:09.35); Mohammed Al-Habsi (1:17.65); Nidhal Al-Harrasi (1:03.65); Naif Al-Qasmi (57.44)	Oman	26 August 2017	Universiade	Taipei, Taiwan	

Legend: # – Record awaiting ratification by Oman Swimming Association; WR – World record; AS – Asian record;
Records not set in finals: h – heat; sf – semifinal; r – relay 1st leg; rh – relay heat 1st leg; b – B final; † – en route to final mark; so – swim-off; tt – time trial

=== Women ===
Event	Time	Name	Club	Date	Meet	Location	Ref
50 m freestyle							
100 m freestyle							
200 m freestyle							
400 m freestyle							
800 m freestyle							
1500 m freestyle							
50 m backstroke							
100 m backstroke							
200 m backstroke							
50 m breaststroke							
100 m breaststroke							
200 m breaststroke							
50 m butterfly							
100 m butterfly							
200 m butterfly							
200 m individual medley							
400 m individual medley							
4×100 m freestyle relay							
4×200 m freestyle relay							
4×100 m medley relay							

Legend: # – Record awaiting ratification by Oman Swimming Association; WR – World record; AS – Asian record;
Records not set in finals: h – heat; sf – semifinal; r – relay 1st leg; rh – relay heat 1st leg; b – B final; † – en route to final mark; so – swim-off; tt – time trial

== Short Course (25 m) ==
=== Men ===
Event	Time		Name	Club	Date	Meet	Location	Ref
50 m freestyle	23.62	h	Issa Al-Adawi	Oman	13 December 2018	World Championships	Hangzhou, China	
100 m freestyle	51.48	h	Issa Al-Adawi	Oman	15 December 2018	World Championships	Hangzhou, China	
200 m freestyle	1:58.03	h	Aiman al Kulaibi	-	7 October 2012	World Cup	Doha, Qatar	
400 m freestyle								
800 m freestyle								
1500 m freestyle								
50m backstroke	27.67	h	Aiman Al-Kulaibi	Oman	1 July 2013	Asian Indoor and Martial Arts Games	Incheon, South Korea	
100m backstroke	58.44		Hussain Taha	Nautilus	21 February 2025	Nautilus Sohar Cup	Muscat, Oman	
200 m backstroke	2:13.81		Hussain Taha	Nautilus	10 June 2024	Nautilus Summer Splash	Muscat, Oman	
50 m breaststroke	28.84		Hussain Taha	Nautilus	14 November 2025	BSM Marlins November Meet	Muscat, Oman	
100 m breaststroke	1:02.78		Hussain Taha	Nautilus	25 April 2026	ABA Aquatics Graded Meet	Muscat, Oman	
200 m breaststroke	2:18.18		Hussain Taha	Nautilus	6 December 2025	Speedo Invitational Meet	Dubai, United Arab Emirates	
50 m butterfly	25.84	h	Nawaf Al-Qasmi	-	6 October 2012	World Cup	Doha, Qatar	
100 m butterfly	58.43	h	Mskm Al-Kulaibi	Oman	13 December 2024	World Championships	Budapest, Hungary	
200 m butterfly								
100m individual medley	57.85		Hussain Taha	Nautilus	24 October 2025	ABA Aquatics Autumn Invitational	Muscat, Oman	
200m individual medley	2:06.96		Hussain Taha	Nautilus	7 December 2025	Speedo Invitational Meet	Dubai, United Arab Emirates	
400m individual medley	4:34.34		Hussain Taha	Nautilus	23 November 2024	Speedo Invitational Meet	Dubai, United Arab Emirates	
4×50 m freestyle relay								
4×100 m freestyle relay								
4×200 m freestyle relay								
4×50 m medley relay								
4×100 m medley relay								

Legend: # – Record awaiting ratification by Oman Swimming Association; WR – World record; AS – Asian record;
Records not set in finals: h – heat; sf – semifinal; r – relay 1st leg; rh – relay heat 1st leg; b – B final; † – en route to final mark; so – swim-off; tt – time trial

=== Women ===
Event	Time	Name	Club	Date	Meet	Location	Ref
50 m freestyle							
100 m freestyle							
200 m freestyle							
400 m freestyle							
800 m freestyle							
1500 m freestyle							
50 m backstroke							
100 m backstroke							
200 m backstroke							
50 m breaststroke							
100 m breaststroke							
200 m breaststroke							
50 m butterfly							
100 m butterfly							
200 m butterfly							
100 m individual medley							
200 m individual medley							
400 m individual medley							
4×50 m freestyle relay							
4×100 m freestyle relay							
4×200 m freestyle relay							
4×50 m medley relay							
4×100 m medley relay							

Legend: # – Record awaiting ratification by Oman Swimming Association; WR – World record; AS – Asian record;
Records not set in finals: h – heat; sf – semifinal; r – relay 1st leg; rh – relay heat 1st leg; b – B final; † – en route to final mark; so – swim-off; tt – time trial
