= Nicholas Browne (disambiguation) =

Nicholas Browne (1947–2014) was a British diplomat.

Nicholas Browne may also refer to:

- Nicholas Browne, 2nd Viscount Kenmare (c. 1660–1720), Irish Jacobite politician and soldier
- Nick Browne (American football) (born 1980), former American football placekicker
- Nick Browne (cricketer) (born 1991), English cricketer
- Nicholas Browne (chef) (born 1990), American chef

== See also ==
- Nicholas Brown (disambiguation)
