= Nicholas Brown =

Nick or Nicholas Brown may refer to:

- Nicholas Brown Sr. (1729–1791), American signer of the 1764 charter of what became Brown University
- Nicholas Brown Jr. (1769–1841), Brown University was renamed for him in 1804
- Nicholas Brown III (1792–1859), American Consul to Italy
- Nicholas Brown (pirate) (died 1726), English pirate
- N. E. Brown (Nicholas Edward Brown, 1849–1934), Kew Gardens plant taxonomist
- Nicholas John Brown (1838–1903), Australian politician, Speaker of the Tasmanian House of Assembly
- Nicholas W. Brown (politician) (1821–1889), manufacturer and political figure in Ontario
- Nicholas Browne-Wilkinson (1930–2018), British judge
- Nick Brown (lawyer) (born 1977), American lawyer
- Nicholas Brown (actor) (born 1980), Australian actor, singer, songwriter and screenwriter
- Nicholas Brown (historian), Australian historian and biographer of Sir John Crawford
- Nicholas Brown, an alias of Nicholas Alahverdian (born 1987), American convicted sex offender who faked his death

== See also ==
- Nicholas Browne (disambiguation)
- Nick Brown (disambiguation)
- Nicholas Braun (1988), American actor
