= Nick Allen Brown =

American author and speaker (born 1978)

- Born: Nicholas Alan Hubbell Brown; February 5, 1978 (age 48); Bowling Green, Kentucky, U.S.
- Occupation: Writer
- Spouse: Rebecca Brown (2006–present)
- Writing career
- Period: 2012–present
- Genres: Fiction; Drama; Mystery; Intrigue
- Website: www.nickallenbrown.com

Nick Allen Brown (born February 5, 1978) is an American author and speaker best known for his fiction books centred around small towns. His first novel, Field of Dead Horses, was published in May 2012 by Harrowood Books. After receiving critical acclaim coupled with exceptional sales, Harrowood Books signed Nick Allen Brown to an indefinite contract.

== Early life ==
Brown was raised by a single mother who encouraged his interests in both literature and film.

== Career ==
=== Writing career ===
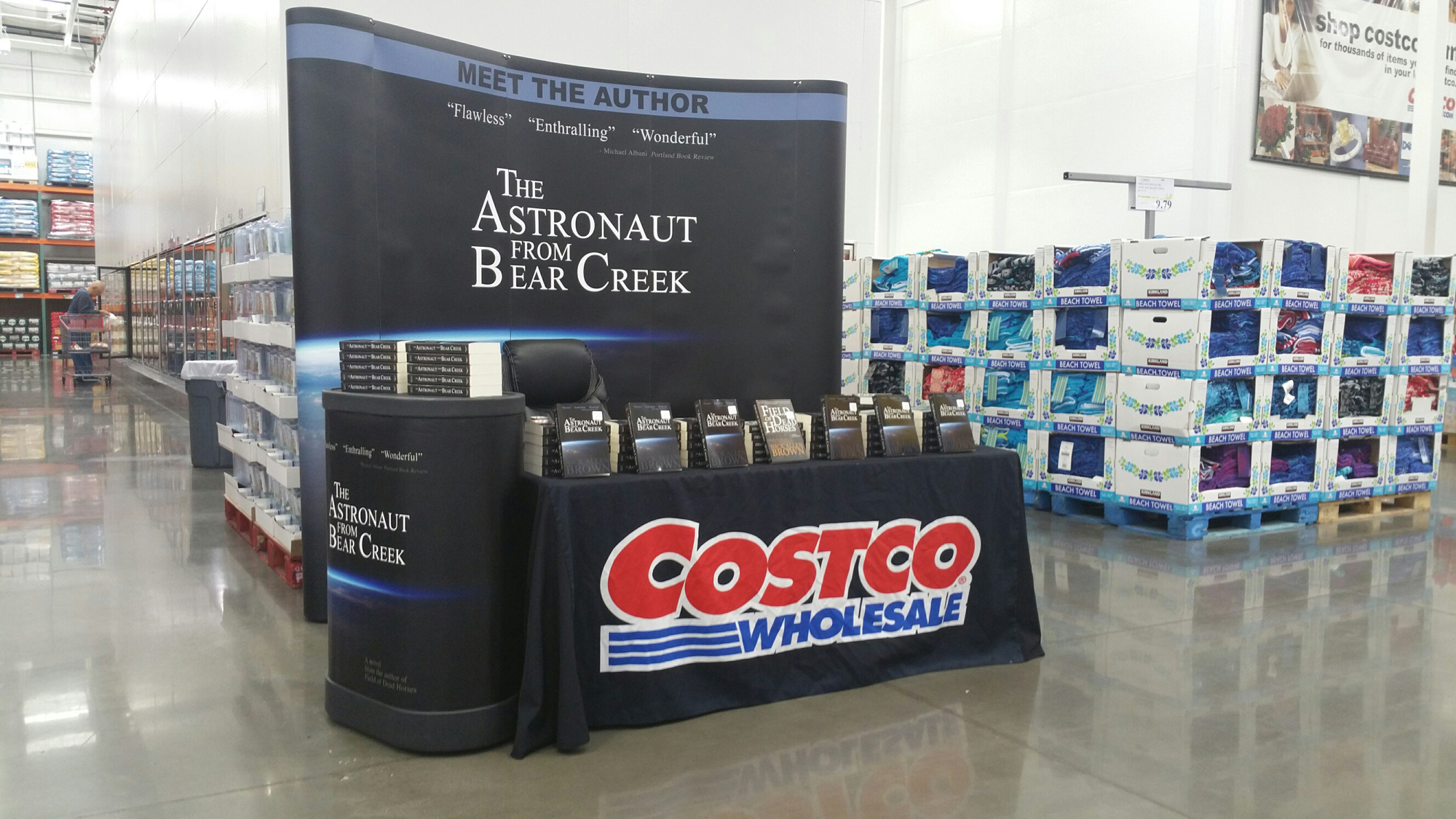
Nick Allen Brown book signing display for Costco in 2016

Brown began his career by writing query letters to more than 300 publishers and literary agents. After receiving more than 200 rejection letters, Brown continued to the pursuit to publish his first manuscript, The Perfect Swing, a fiction story set in present day about the first ever amateur Masters Tournament winner. Taking advice he received from those who rejected him in the industry, Brown penned Field of Dead Horses, a mystery set in northern Kentucky in 1939.

In 2014, his second novel, The Astronaut from Bear Creek was published, selling more than five thousand copies in its first week.

== Personal life ==
Brown married Rebecca Lynn Tenpenny in Maryville, Tennessee and lives in Nashville, Tennessee where they have two children.

In 2004, he interned for Gary Shusett and Ron Shusett in Los Angeles, California as part of the famous Sherwood Oaks Experimental College founded by Gary Shusett. While interning for Sherwood Oaks Experimental College, Brown received instruction from Gary Goldman (screenwriter), James Cameron, and Quentin Tarantino.

During the fifteen years that Brown was working to become a full-time author, he worked at television station, WBKO and Hughes and Coleman Law Firm.

== Awards and honors ==
- 2013 Reader's Favorite Award for historical fiction - Field of Dead Horses
- 2015 Official selection for One Book, One Community of Shelby County, Kentucky

== Bibliography ==
A complete listing of the works by Nick Allen Brown

=== Novels ===
- Field of Dead Horses (2012)
- The Astronaut from Bear Creek (2014)
- Grainger County Tomatoes (2020)

=== Published under the name Nicholas H. ===
- What Lies Inside (2017)
