= Alexandre Perreault =

Canadian swimmer

Personal information
- Nationality: Canadian
- Born: 15 December 1998 (age 27)

Sport
- Sport: Swimming
Medal record
Men's swimming
Representing Canada
Junior Pan Pacific Championships
| Bronze medal – third place | 2016 Maui | 4×100 m freestyle |

Alexandre Perreault (born 15 December 1998) is a Canadian swimmer. He competed in the men's 50 metre butterfly event at the 2018 FINA World Swimming Championships (25 m), in Hangzhou, China.
