= Oleg Kostin =

Russian swimmer (born 1992)

Personal information
- Full name: Oleg Olegovich Kostin
- Nationality: Russian
- Born: 6 May 1992 (age 34) Nizhny Novgorod, Russia

Sport
- Sport: Swimming
- Strokes: Breaststroke, butterfly
Medal record
Men's swimming
Representing Neutral Athletes B
World Championships (SC)
Gold medal – first place	2024 Budapest	4×50 m mixed medley
Representing Russian Swimming Federation
World Championships (SC)
Gold medal – first place	2021 Abu Dhabi	4×50 m medley
Representing Russia
World Championships (LC)
Silver medal – second place	2019 Gwangju	50 m butterfly
World Championships (SC)
Gold medal – first place	2016 Windsor	4×50 m medley
Gold medal – first place	2016 Windsor	4×100 m medley
Gold medal – first place	2018 Hangzhou	4×50 m medley
Silver medal – second place	2018 Hangzhou	4×100 m medley
Bronze medal – third place	2018 Hangzhou	4×50 m mixed medley
European Championships (LC)
Bronze medal – third place	2018 Glasgow	50 m butterfly
European Championships (SC)
Gold medal – first place	2019 Glasgow	50 m butterfly
Gold medal – first place	2019 Glasgow	4×50 m medley
Gold medal – first place	2019 Glasgow	4×50 m mixed medley
Silver medal – second place	2015 Netanya	4×50 m medley
Silver medal – second place	2021 Kazan	4×50 m medley
Bronze medal – third place	2015 Netanya	50 m breaststroke
Bronze medal – third place	2021 Kazan	4×50 m mixed medley
Summer Universiade
Gold medal – first place	2015 Gwangju	4x100 m medley
Military World Games
Gold medal – first place	2019 Wuhan	50 m butterfly
Gold medal – first place	2019 Wuhan	4×100 m medley
Silver medal – second place	2019 Wuhan	100 m butterfly

Oleg Olegovich Kostin (Russian: Олег Олегович Костин; born 6 May 1992) is a Russian swimmer. He competed in the men's 50 metre butterfly event at the 2017 World Aquatics Championships. At the 2018 European Championships in Glasgow, he won a bronze in the 50 metre butterfly, setting a Russian 50 metre butterfly record of 22.97 seconds.

At the 2023 Russian National Championships, in April at the Palace of Water Sports in Kazan, Kostin set a new Russian record of 22.62 seconds in the 50 metre butterfly in a time trials conducted after the semifinals and before the final and contested by five of the swimmers in the event.
