= Takaya Yasue =

Japanese swimmer

Personal information
- Nationality: Japanese
- Born: 15 January 1996 (age 30)

Sport
- Sport: Swimming

Takaya Yasue (born 15 January 1996) is a Japanese swimmer. He competed in the men's 50 metre butterfly event at the 2018 FINA World Swimming Championships (25 m), in Hangzhou, China.
