= Takeshi Kawamoto =

Japanese swimmer (born 1995)

Personal information
- Nationality: Japanese
- Born: 19 February 1995 (age 31) Seto, Aichi, Japan

Sport
- Sport: Swimming
Medal record
Men's swimming
Representing Japan
World Swimming Championships (SC)
Bronze medal – third place	2016 Windsor	4×100 m medley
Bronze medal – third place	2016 Windsor	4×50 m mixed medley
Bronze medal – third place	2018 Hangzhou	4×100 m medley
Asian Championships
Silver medal – second place	2012 Dubai	50 m backstroke
Silver medal – second place	2012 Dubai	100 m backstroke
Silver medal – second place	2012 Dubai	4×100 m freestyle
Silver medal – second place	2012 Dubai	4×100 m medley
Silver medal – second place	2016 Tokyo	100 m butterfly
Silver medal – second place	2016 Tokyo	4×100 m medley
Bronze medal – third place	2012 Dubai	100 m butterfly
Bronze medal – third place	2016 Tokyo	100 m backstroke
Bronze medal – third place	2016 Tokyo	50 m butterfly
Junior Pan Pacific Championships
Gold medal – first place	2012 Honolulu	4×100 m medley
Bronze medal – third place	2012 Honolulu	100 m backstroke
Bronze medal – third place	2012 Honolulu	4×100 m freestyle

Takeshi Kawamoto (川本武史, Kawamoto Takeshi, born 19 February 1995) is a Japanese swimmer. He competed in the men's 50 metre butterfly event at the 2018 FINA World Swimming Championships (25 m), in Hangzhou, China.
