= Ridhwan Abubakar =

Kenyan swimmer (born 2000)

Ridhwan Abubakar Bwana Mohamed (born 15 August 2000) is a Kenyan swimmer. At the 2024 Summer Olympics, Abubakar represented Kenya in the men's 400m freestyle. Abubakar was eliminated from the Olympics after the heats, placing fourth in the first heat, with his time being 19 seconds slower than eventual gold winner Lukas Martens.

== Personal life ==
Abubakar lives in the United Kingdom, and graduated from the University of Plymouth with a degree in mechanical engineering in 2022.
