= Catalina Bustamante =

Spanish-born teacher in New Spain (c. 1480~90–1563)

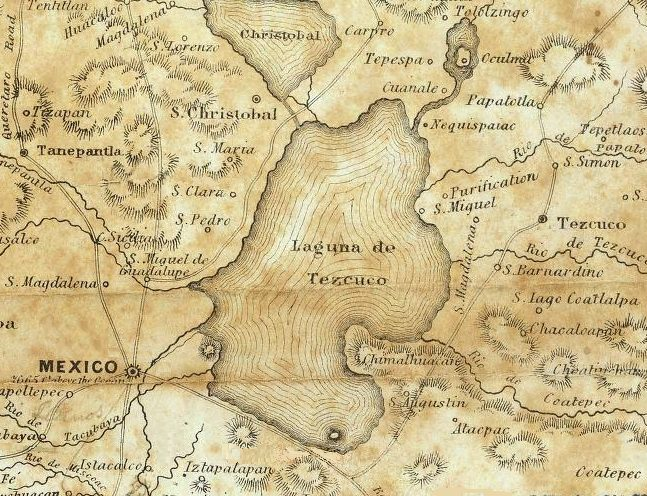
Texcoco, place where Catalina de Bustamante taught, next to lake Texcoco.

Catalina Bustamante (born in Llerena between 1480 and 1490 CE –1536 CE) was considered to be the "first teacher in America" ("primera educadora de América"). In 1514 She traveled to the Americas with her husband and children, where she was eventually widowed. Bishops Juan Zumarraga and Toribio Benavente de Motolinía played significant roles in vouching for her capabilities, and one of them appointed her to a position teaching indigenous girls at a school in Texcoco. Records disagree on which bishop it was that extended the official invitation to Bustamante to begin teaching. She taught the Spanish way of life to these girls and fought for their rights, most notably in the case regarding Juan Peláez. Through direct correspondence to Holy Roman Emperor Charles V and Empress Isabel of Portugal, Bustamante was able to educate and protect the indigenous girls in her care.

== Early life in Spain ==
Catalina Bustamante was born in Llerena, Spain around 1480–1490 CE. She was most likely born into a high social class, as she received access to education in her early years. She had training in Greek and Latin, along with learning to read and write in Spanish. She was married between 1505 and 1512 to Pedro Tinoco. In 1514, she traveled with the Tinoco family to New Spain, accompanied by her husband and two daughters.

== Life in New Spain ==
Bustamante came to New Spain in the wake of the first colonial interactions. She lived in the area of Salvatierra (area of modern Dominican Republic) until 1526 when Hernan Cortés officially conquered the Aztec empire for Spain. Bustamante's husband died, likely during their time in the Salvatierra, leaving Bustamante, her daughters, and her son-in-law to migrate to Texcoco in 1526.

Spanish women in the New World had freedoms that Spain had not previously offered them, including further rights regarding choice of spouse and to control property. Using these freedoms, many Spanish women played an important role in transferring Spanish culture and traditions to the unstable colonial environment. Bustamante transferred Spanish culture and Christian marital ideals through education.

== Education of indigenous girls ==
Juan de Zumáraga saw the education of indigenous peoples as paramount, due to his beliefs that native people were fully human and capable of reason. He also founded schools, including the one that Bustamante taught at, as a means of maintaining order. Toribio de Benavente had an opposing reasoning, but was also in favor of education in the New World. He mentions the eradication of cannibalism and human sacrifice as examples of why he supported the education of the indigenous cultures, and did not see the native populations in the same positive light as Zumárraga.

Bustamante was asked by Zumárraga (though there is some dispute that she was commissioned by Benavente de Motolinía) to teach at the first school for indigenous girls in Texcoco, established in the repurposed palace of Nezahualcayotzin. She taught reading, writing, Christianity, and the basic "feminine" skills of the Spanish. She also taught etiquette, how to dress, and Spanish home management practices. Bustamante likely used the Cartillas de Villadolid, which were very popular for education at the time. The Cartillas de Valladolid were small books with introductions to letters, numbers, and the catechsims.

Bustamante understood that education would have been important for these indigenous girls, as they would need an understanding of the Spanish language and culture in order to establish themselves as respectable individuals within the colonial regime.

== Social activism ==
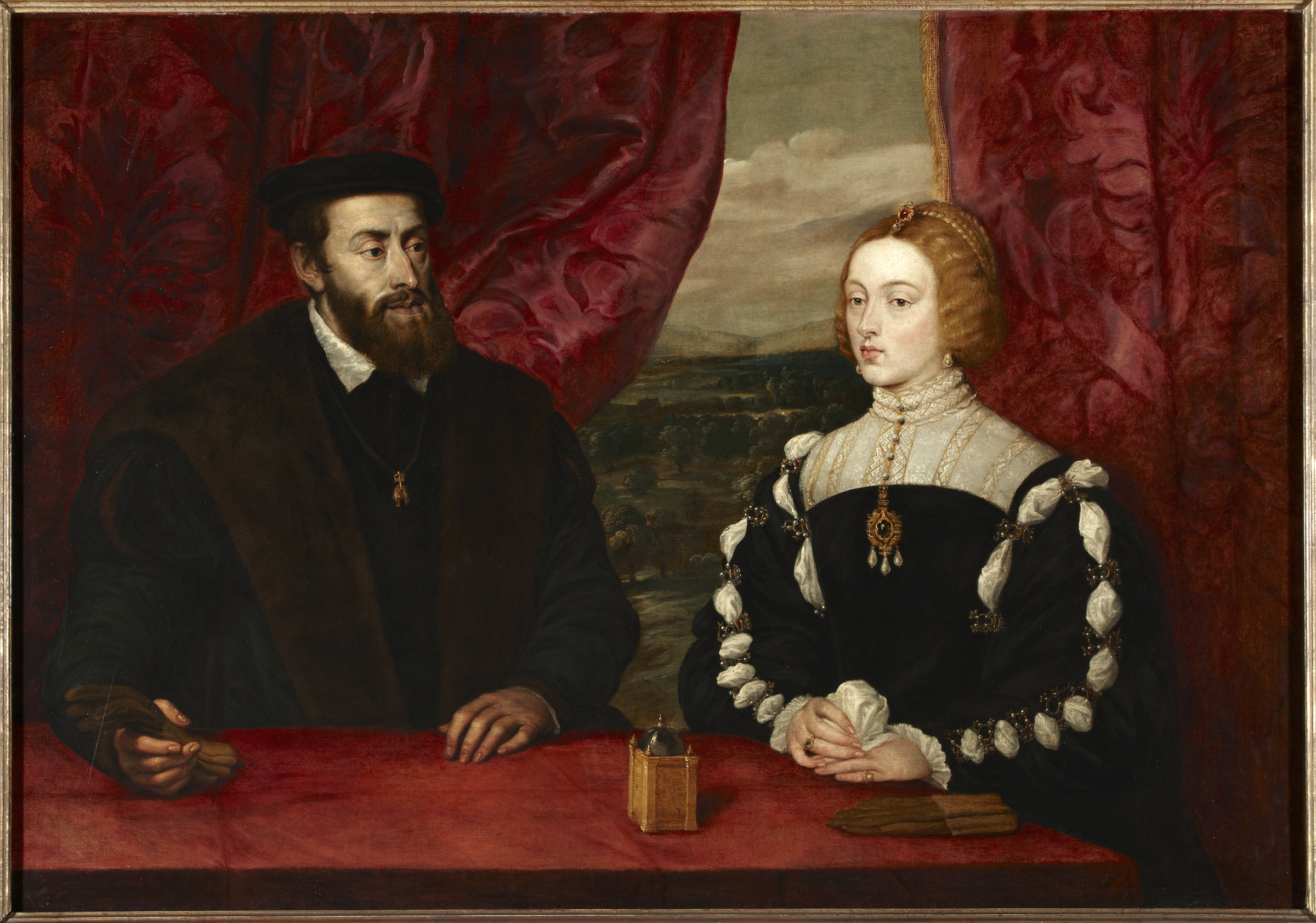
Catalina wrote to these leaders for help, they sent more teachers to the New World.

Bustamante played a large role in advocating for indigenous girls along with educating them. Upon hearing that Captain Juan Peláez abducted two young native girls, Bustamante played a first hand role in bringing about justice. She wrote to the Holy Roman Emperor, Charles V, about the need for punishment of the offenders, and his wife, Empress Isabel of Portugal, received Bustamante's petition. Isabel acted as a regent in Spain, while Charles V attended to the interior European countries of the Holy Roman Empire. She was sympathetic to Bustamante's cause and sent more teachers to New Spain, along with establishing legal action against these offenses. In 1535, Bustamante met with Isabel of Portugal in person to request that more teachers be sent to New Spain to improve the situation of indigenous girls and women.

== Death and legacy ==
Bustamante died of plague around 1536 CE. Due to her requests to Isabel of Portugal, many teachers such as Elena Medrano, Ana de Mesa, and Luisa de San Francisco came to New Spain, resulting in the establishment of new schools for indigenous girls. She also established an example of a religious woman being able to share secular knowledge with indigenous girls. Later beatas and nuns, such as Sor Juana Inéz de la Cruz, followed suit. Bustamante's contributions have been celebrated by the city of Texcoco through the creation of a statue in her likeness, which has inscribed "first educator in America."
