= Inés Marín =

Chilean swimmer

Personal information
- Nationality: Chilean
- Born: 19 April 2001 (age 25)

Sport
- Sport: Swimming
Medal record
Women's swimming
Representing Chile
Bolivarian Games
Silver medal – second place	2025 Lima-Ayacucho	100 m freestyle

Inés Marín (born 19 April 2001) is a Chilean swimmer. She competed in the women's 100 metre freestyle event at the 2018 FINA World Swimming Championships (25 m), in Hangzhou, China.
