= Aleksandr Kharlanov =

Russian swimmer

Personal information
- Native name: Александр Игоревич Харланов
- Nationality: Russia
- Born: 26 October 1995 (age 31)

Sport
- Sport: Swimming
- Strokes: butterfly
Medal record
World Championships (SC)
Gold medal – first place	2016 Windsor	4x100 m medley
Silver medal – second place	2018 Hangzhou	4x100 m medley
European Championships (SC)
Gold medal – first place	2017 Copenhagen	200 m butterfly

Aleksandr Kharlanov (Russian: Александр Игоревич Харланов) is a Russian swimmer. He won the gold medal in 200 metres butterfly at the 2017 European Short Course Swimming Championships.
