= Gabriel Araya =

Chilean swimmer (born 1999)

Personal information
- Nationality: Chilean
- Born: 7 April 1999 (age 27)

Sport
- Sport: Swimming
Medal record
Men's swimming
Representing Chile
South American Championships
Bronze medal – third place	2021 Buenos Aires	4×200 m freestyle

Gabriel Araya (born 7 April 1999) is a Chilean swimmer. He competed in the men's 100m butterfly event at the 2018 FINA World Swimming Championships (25 m), in Hangzhou, China. In 2019, Araya participated in two events at the 2019 World Aquatics Championships in Gwangju, South Korea.
