= Liubomyr Lemeshko =

Ukrainian swimmer

Personal information
- Born: July 19, 1992 (age 33)

Sport
- Sport: Swimming
- Strokes: Butterfly

Liubomyr Lemeshko (born July 19, 1992) is a Ukrainian swimmer. He competed at the 2016 Summer Olympics in the men's 100 metre butterfly; his time of 52.51 seconds in the heats did not qualify him for the semifinals.
