= Piero Codia =

Italian swimmer (born 1989)

Personal information
- National team: Italy
- Born: 22 October 1989 (age 36) Trieste
- Height: 1.90 m (6 ft 3 in)
- Weight: 80 kg (176 lb)

Sport
- Sport: Swimming
- Strokes: Butterfly
Medal record
Men's swimming
Representing Italy
World Championships (LC)
Gold medal – first place	2022 Budapest	4×100 m medley
European Championships (LC)
Gold medal – first place	2018 Glasgow	100 m butterfly
Silver medal – second place	2016 London	4×100 m mixed medley
Bronze medal – third place	2020 Budapest	4×100 m medley
European Championships (SC)
Gold medal – first place	2013 Herning	4×50 m medley
Silver medal – second place	2017 Copenhagen	100 m butterfly
Silver medal – second place	2017 Copenhagen	4×50 m medley

Piero Codia (born 22 October 1989) is an Italian former competitive swimmer who specializes in butterfly. He holds the national records in the 50 and 100 meter butterfly events (long course).

== Olympics ==
He qualified for the 2016 Summer Olympics in Rio de Janeiro in the 100 meter butterfly. He swam the 6th time in the heats and qualified for the semifinals, where he placed 11th and was eliminated.
