= Nic Brown (swimmer) =

Australian swimmer

Personal information
- Nationality: Australian
- Born: 8 March 1996 (age 30)

Sport
- Sport: Swimming
Medal record
Representing Australia
Summer Universiade
Silver medal – second place	2015 Gwangju	4x200m freestyle relay

Nic Brown (born 8 March 1996) is an Australian swimmer. He competed in the men's 100 metre butterfly and men's 200 metre butterfly event at the 2018 FINA World Swimming Championships (25 m), in Hangzhou, China.
