= Mehdy Metella =

French swimmer (born 1992)

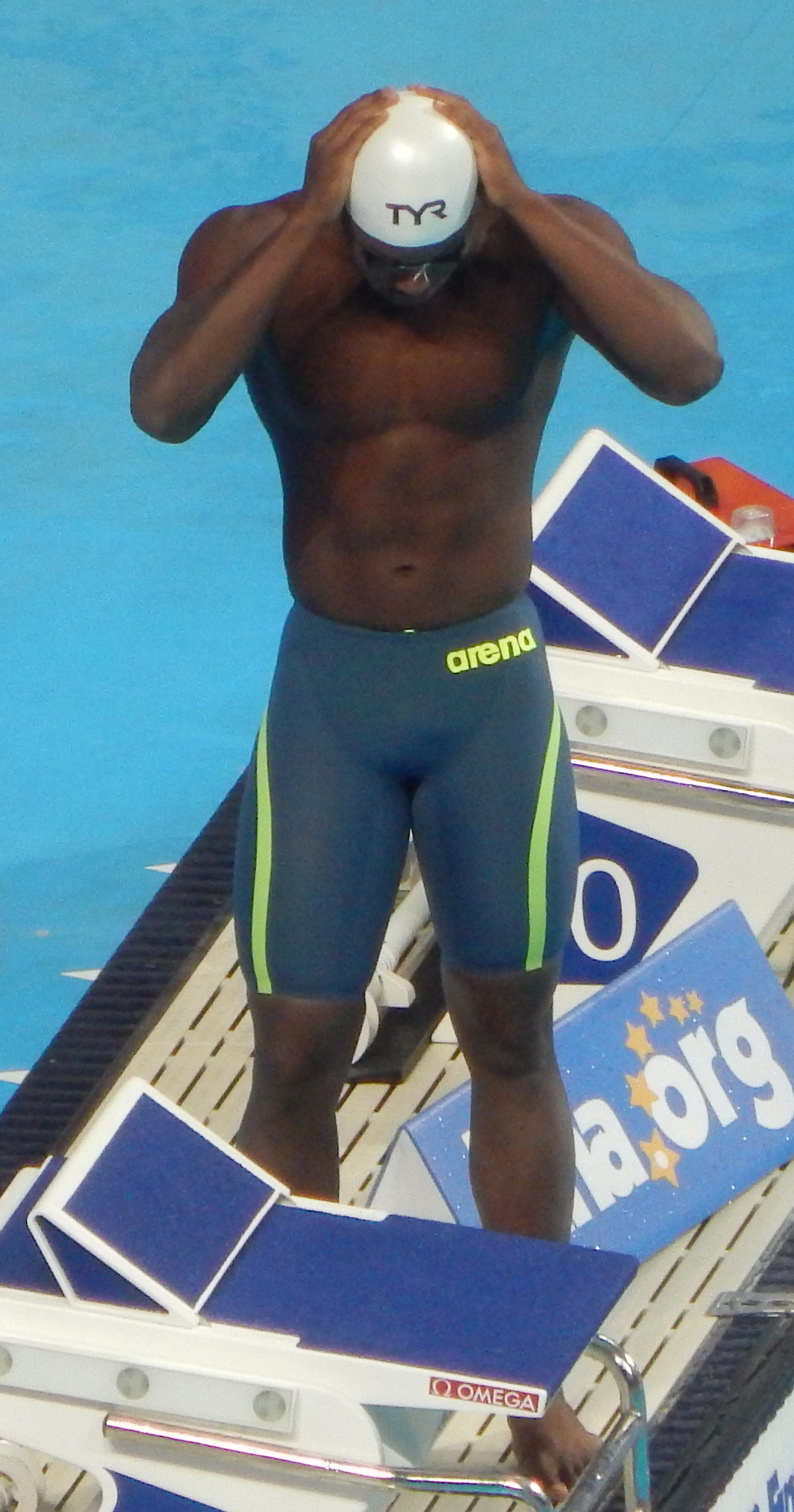
- Metella in Kazan, Russia 2015

Personal information
- National team: France
- Born: 17 July 1992 (age 34) Cayenne, French Guiana, France
- Height: 1.91 m (6 ft 3 in)
- Weight: 95 kg (209 lb)

Sport
- Sport: Swimming
- Strokes: Freestyle, butterfly
Medal record
Olympic Games
Silver medal – second place	2016 Rio de Janeiro	4×100 m freestyle
World Championships (LC)
Gold medal – first place	2015 Kazan	4×100 m freestyle
Bronze medal – third place	2015 Kazan	4×100 m medley
Bronze medal – third place	2017 Budapest	100 m freestyle
Bronze medal – third place	2019 Gwangju	4×100 m mixed freestyle
World Championships (SC)
Gold medal – first place	2014 Doha	4×100 m freestyle
Silver medal – second place	2014 Doha	4×50 m medley
Silver medal – second place	2016 Windsor	4×100 m freestyle
Bronze medal – third place	2014 Doha	4×100 m medley
European championships (LC)
Gold medal – first place	2014 Berlin	4×100 m freestyle
Gold medal – first place	2018 Glasgow	4×100 m mixed freestyle
Silver medal – second place	2014 Berlin	4×100 m medley
Silver medal – second place	2016 London	4×100 m medley
Silver medal – second place	2018 Glasgow	100 m butterfly
Bronze medal – third place	2016 London	100 m butterfly
Bronze medal – third place	2018 Glasgow	100 m freestyle
European championships (SC)
Gold medal – first place	2012 Chartres	4×50 m freestyle
Gold medal – first place	2012 Chartres	4×50 m mixed freestyle
Bronze medal – third place	2012 Chartres	100 m butterfly

Mehdy Metella (born 17 July 1992) is a French freestyle and butterfly swimmer. He was part of the freestyle and medley 4 × 100 m teams that won a gold and a silver medal at the 2014 European Aquatics Championships and gold and bronze at the 2015 World Championship. In both cases, he swam the butterfly leg in the medley relay.

He also won multiple medals in the World and European Short Course swimming events.

He is the French record holder of the 100m butterfly long course, with a time of 51.06. In the French swimming championships in Rennes he broke his own national record in the 100 m butterfly with a time of 50s85’’.

== Personal life ==
He is the younger brother of Malia Metella, an Olympic and World championship medallist.
