= List of Trinidad and Tobago records in swimming =

The Trinidad & Tobago Records in Swimming are the fastest times ever swum by a swimmer representing Trinidad and Tobago. These records are kept/maintained by Trinidad & Tobago's national swimming federation: the Aquatics Sports Association of Trinidad and Tobago (ASATT). Records are recognized for long course (50m) and short course (25m) events:

- freestyle: 50, 100, 200, 400, 800 and 1500;
- backstroke: 50, 100 and 200;
- breaststroke: 50, 100 and 200;
- butterfly: 50, 100 and 200;
- individual medley: 100 (25m only), 200 and 400;

== Long Course (50m) ==
=== Men ===
Event	Time		Name	Club	Date	Meet	Location	Ref
50 m freestyle	21.20	sf, so	George Bovell	Trinidad & Tobago	31 July 2009	World Championships	Rome, Italy	
100 m freestyle	48.16	h	Dylan Carter	Trinidad & Tobago	26 July 2023	World Championships	Fukuoka, Japan	
200 m freestyle	1:47.55	r	Nikoli Blackman	Trinidad & Tobago	19 June 2024	CCCAN Championships	Monterrey, Mexico	
400 m freestyle	3:57.45	b	Graham Chatoor	Mission Viejo Nadadores	18 May 2023	TYR Pro Swim Series	Mission Viejo, United States	
800 m freestyle	8:16.65		Graham Chatoor	Mission Viejo Nadadores	16 April 2023	MVN Fran Crippen Memorial Swim Meet of Champions	Mission Viejo, United States	
1500 m freestyle	16:07.67		Graham Chatoor	Mission Viejo Nadadores	13 April 2023	MVN Fran Crippen Memorial Swim Meet of Champions	Mission Viejo, United States	
50 m backstroke	24.83		Dylan Carter	Trinidad & Tobago	24 July 2018	CAC Games	Barranquilla, Colombia	
100 m backstroke	54.03	h	Dylan Carter	Trinidad & Tobago	22 July 2019	World Championships	Gwangju, South Korea	
200 m backstroke	2:02.29		Liam Carrington	Trinidad & Tobago	7 April 2026	CARIFTA Championships	Le Lamentin, Martinique	
50 m breaststroke	28.22		George Bovell	Club Wolverine	June 2013	Canada Cup	Montreal, Canada	
100 m breaststroke	1:03.47	h	Abraham McLeod	Trinidad and Tobago	28 July 2013	World Championships	Barcelona, Spain	
200 m breaststroke	2:23.29		Tariq Lashley	Trinidad & Tobago	20 April 2017	Eastern Canadian Championships	Etobicoke, Canada	
50 m butterfly	22.85		Dylan Carter	Trinidad and Tobago	19 June 2022	World Championships	Budapest, Hungary	
100 m butterfly	52.15		Dylan Carter	Azura Florida Aqatics	18 June 2026	TYR Pro Swim Series	Indianapolis, United States	
200 m butterfly	2:05.03	h	Kael Yorke	Trinidad and Tobago	12 October 2018	Youth Olympic Games	Buenos Aires, Argentina	
200m individual medley	1:58.80		George Bovell	Trinidad and Tobago	19 August 2004	Olympic Games	Athens, Greece	
400m individual medley	4:29.52		George Bovell	Trinidad and Tobago	17 September 2000	Olympic Games	Sydney, Australia	
4×50m freestyle relay	1:34.46		Nikoli Blackman; Giovanni Rivas; Zachary Anthony; Zarek Wilson	Trinidad & Tobago	9 April 2023	CARIFTA Championships	Willemstad, Curaçao	
4×100m freestyle relay	3:16.91		Liam Carrington (49.30); Dylan Carter (48.47); Zerek Wilson (49.81); Nikoli Blackman (49.33)	Trinidad and Tobago	29 July 2026	CAC Games	Santo Domingo, Dominican Republic	
4×200m freestyle relay	7:52.59		Nikoli Blackman (1:47.55); Graham Chatoor (1:56.59); Aqeel Joseph (1:58.14); Johann Matamoro (2:10.31)	Trinidad & Tobago	19 June 2024	CCCAN Championships	Monterrey, Mexico	
4×100m medley relay	3:54.84		Jabari Baptiste (58.78); Tariq Lashley (1:06.68); Christian Awah (58.25); Joshua Romany (51.13)	Trinidad and Tobago	2 July 2017	CCCAN	Couva, Trinidad and Tobago	

Legend: # – Record awaiting ratification by ASATT; WR – World record; AM – Americas record;
Records not set in finals: h – heat; sf – semifinal; r – relay 1st leg; rh – relay heat 1st leg; b – B final; † – en route to final mark; so – swim-off; tt – time trial

=== Women ===
Event	Time		Name	Club	Date	Meet	Location	Ref
50 m freestyle	25.39	tt	Cherelle Thompson	Eagles Aquatics International	19 January 2020	TYR Pro Swim Series	Knoxville, United States	
100 m freestyle	56.40	h	Isabella Dieffenthaller	Saint Petersburg Aquatics	3 June 2025	USA Championships	Indianapolis, United States	
200 m freestyle	2:02.01	h	Isabella Dieffenthaller	Saint Petersburg Aquatics	4 June 2025	USA Championships	Indianapolis, United States	
400 m freestyle	4:24.17	b	Giselle Gursoy	Trinidad & Tobago	6 August 2019	Pan American Games	Lima, Peru	
800 m freestyle	9:14.78		Samantha Rahael	Trinidad & Tobago	3 April 2010	CARIFTA Championships	Kingston, Jamaica	
1500 m freestyle	18:48.65		Zara Persico	Trinidad & Tobago	21 April 2025	CARIFTA Championships	Couva, Trinidad and Tobago	
50m backstroke	28.85	c	Zuri Ferguson	Gator	18 June 2026	TYR Pro Swim Series	Indianapolis, United States	
100m backstroke	1:01.62		Zuri Ferguson	Bluefish	11 July 2024	New England Senior Championships	Providence, United States	
200m backstroke	2:12.57	b	Zuri Ferguson	Gator	19 June 2026	TYR Pro Swim Series	Indianapolis, United States	
50m breaststroke	33.06		Tyla Ho-A-Shu	RWB Aquatic Academy	17 May 2025	National Championships	Couva, Trinidad and Tobago	
100m breaststroke	1:12.33		Alexandria Donahue	Trinidad & Tobago	March 2013	CARIFTA Championships	Kingston, Jamaica	
200m breaststroke	2:36.01		Cerian Gibbs	Trinidad & Tobago	August 1995	Pan Pacs	Atlanta, United States	
50m butterfly	28.05		Sharntelle McLean	Trinidad & Tobago	July 2004	CISC	Kingston, Jamaica	
100m butterfly	1:02.76		Siobhan Cropper	Trinidad & Tobago	23 August 1999	Pan Pacs	Sydney, Australia	
200m butterfly	2:19.06		Tyla Martin	Pine Crest	July 2013	Southern Zone; Senior Championships	Plantation, United States	
200m individual medley	2:23.61		Samantha Rahael	Trinidad & Tobago	5 April 2010	CARIFTA	Kingston, Jamaica	
400m individual medley	5:04.59		Samantha Rahael	Trinidad & Tobago	8 August 2010	CAC Games	Mayagüez, Puerto Rico	
4×50m freestyle relay	1:52.76		Deshor Edwards; Jada Chatoor; Anneliese Merry; Danielle Williams	Trinidad and Tobago	23 April 2019	CARIFTA Championships	Bridgetown, Barbados	
4×100m freestyle relay	4:07.43		Danielle Williams; Jada Chai; Deshor Edwards; Amira Pilgrim	Trinidad and Tobago	29 June 2017	CCCAN	Couva, Trinidad and Tobago	
4×200m freestyle relay	9:48.18		Amira Pilgrim; Racine Ross; Vrisnelit Faure; Jada Chai	Trinidad and Tobago	1 July 2017	CCCAN	Couva, Trinidad and Tobago	
4×100m medley relay	4:27.26		Zuri Ferguson (1:03.70); T. Ho A Shu (1:16.26); L. Browne (1:06.32); A. Ash (1:00.98)	Trinidad and Tobago	2 April 2024	CARIFTA Championships	Nassau, Bahamas	

Legend: # – Record awaiting ratification by ASATT; WR – World record; AM – Americas record;
Records not set in finals: h – heat; sf – semifinal; r – relay 1st leg; rh – relay heat 1st leg; b – B final; † – en route to final mark; so – swim-off; tt – time trial

=== Mixed relay ===
Event	Time		Name	Club	Date	Meet	Location	Ref
4×50 m freestyle relay	1:36.61		Dylan Carter (22.67); Johnnya Ferdinand (25.97); Cherelle Thompson (25.52); Caryle Blondell (22.45)	Trinidad and Tobago	29 June 2016	CISC	Nassau, Bahamas	
4×100 m freestyle relay	3:47.98	h	Zachary Anthony (52.24); Amari Ash (1:03.14); Zuri Ferguson (1:01.11); Zarek Wilson (51.49)	Trinidad and Tobago	11 August 2025	Junior Pan American Games	Asunción, Paraguay	
4×50 m medley relay								
4×100 m medley relay	4:16.73	h	Johann-mathew Matamoro (59.27); Tyla Ho-A-Shu (1:17.42); Zarek Wilson (56.86); Amari Ash (1:03.18)	Trinidad and Tobago	12 August 2025	Junior Pan American Games	Asunción, Paraguay	

Legend: # – Record awaiting ratification by ASATT; WR – World record; AM – Americas record;
Records not set in finals: h – heat; so – swim-off

== Short Course (25m) ==
=== Men ===
Event	Time		Name	Club	Date	Meet	Location	Ref
50m freestyle	20.70	h	Dylan Carter	Trinidad & Tobago	16 December 2022	World Championships	Melbourne, Australia	
100m freestyle	46.02		Dylan Carter	Unattached	11 November 2022	National Championships	Couva, Trinidad and Tobago	
200m freestyle	1:42.48		Dylan Carter	Trinidad and Tobago	7 December 2016	World Championships	Windsor, Canada	
400m freestyle	3:50.05		Dylan Carter	unattached	December 2013	ASATT Short Course Trials	Trinidad and Tobago	
800m freestyle	8:21.16		Nikoli Blackman	Marlins	17 November 2021	ASATT National Age Group Swimming Championships	Couva, Trinidad and Tobago	
1500m freestyle	15:55.23		George Bovell	Flying Fish	May 1999	Trinidad 25m Nationals	Trinidad and Tobago	
50m backstroke	22.72	CR	Dylan Carter	Trinidad & Tobago	4 November 2022	World Cup	Indianapolis, United States	
100m backstroke	49.91		Dylan Carter	LA Current	22 November 2020	International Swimming League	Budapest, Hungary	
200m backstroke	1:59.43		Nicholas Bovell	CNPPO	15 February 2007	Canada Eastern Championships	Montreal, Canada	
50m breaststroke	26.81		George Bovell	Trinidad & Tobago	1 November 2014	World Cup	Singapore, Singapore	
100m breaststroke	59.35	h	Abraham McLeod	Trinidad & Tobago	12 December 2012	Short Course Worlds	Istanbul, Turkey	
200m breaststroke	2:15.15		Abraham McLeod	Atlantis	November 2012	Trinidad 25m Nationals	Trinidad and Tobago	
50m butterfly	21.98		Dylan Carter	Trinidad & Tobago	20 December 2021	World Championships	Abu Dhabi, United Arab Emirates	
100m butterfly	49.87	sf	Dylan Carter	Trinidad & Tobago	17 December 2021	World Championships	Abu Dhabi, United Arab Emirates	
200m butterfly	2:03.49		Christian Homer		November 2009	ASA Southwest Regional	Great Britain	
100m individual medley	51.15		George Bovell	Trinidad & Tobago	7 August 2013	World Cup	Eindhoven, Netherlands	
200m individual medley	1:53.93		George Bovell	Auburn University	25 March 2004	NCAA Championships	East Meadow, United States	
400m individual medley	4:21.83		George Bovell	Auburn University	January 2004		Auburn, United States	
4×100m freestyle relay								
4×200m freestyle relay								
4×100m medley relay								

Legend: # – Record awaiting ratification by ASATT;
Records not set in finals: h – heat; sf – semifinal; r – relay 1st leg; rh – relay heat 1st leg; b – B final; † – en route to final mark; so – swim-off; tt – time trial

=== Women ===
Event	Time		Name	Club	Date	Meet	Location	Ref
50 m freestyle	24.89		Cherelle Thompson	Eagles International	10 November 2019	ASATT National Age Group Swimming Championships	Couva, Trinidad and Tobago	
100 m freestyle	55.53		Siobhan Cropper	Stanford University	20 March 2000	NCAA Championships	Indianapolis, United States	
200 m freestyle	2:06.54		Kimberlee John-Williams	BDS	11 July 2009	Trinidad Championships	Trinidad and Tobago	
400 m freestyle	4:28.83		Kimberlee John-Williams	BDS	November 2009	Trinidad Open	Trinidad and Tobago	
800 m freestyle	9:13.95		Kimberlee John-Williams	BDS	19 November 2009	Trinidad Open	Trinidad and Tobago	
1500 m freestyle	18:02.90		Syriah David	Tide Water	8 November 2013	Trinidad Open	San Fernando, Trinidad and Tobago	
50 m backstroke	27.83	h	Zuri Ferguson	Trinidad & Tobago	12 December 2024	World Championships	Budapest, Hungary	
100 m backstroke	1:00.12	h	Zuri Ferguson	Trinidad & Tobago	10 December 2024	World Championships	Budapest, Hungary	
200 m backstroke	2:10.62	h	Zuri Ferguson	Trinidad & Tobago	15 December 2024	World Championships	Budapest, Hungary	
50 m breaststroke	32.41	h	Tyla Ho-A-Shu	RWB Aquatic Academy	15 November 2023	National Championships	Couva, Trinidad and Tobago	
100 m breaststroke	1:12.55		Cerian Gibbes		March 1997			
200 m breaststroke	2:37.05		Cerian Gibbes		May 1995			
50m butterfly	27.88		Sharntelle McLean	Torpedoes	9 November 2012	Trinidad & Tobago Open	Trinidad and Tobago	
100m butterfly	1:01.72		Siobhan Cropper	Stanford University	19 March 2000	NCAA Championships	Indianapolis, United States	
200m butterfly	2:23.60		Ayeisha Collymore	PIR	March 2005	Trinidad & Tobago Nationals	Trinidad and Tobago	
100m individual medley	1:10.06		DeNicha Lewis	Flying Fish	11 November 2018	National Open Championships	Couva, Trinidad and Tobago	
200m individual medley	2:22.86		Cerian Gibbes	Bolles Sharks	3 December 1998	U.S. Open	College Station, United States	
400m individual medley	5:07.50		Cerian Gibbes	March 1996				
4×100m freestyle relay								
4×200m freestyle relay								
4×100m medley relay								

Legend: # – Record awaiting ratification by ASATT;
Records not set in finals: h – heat; sf – semifinal; r – relay 1st leg; rh – relay heat 1st leg; b – B final; † – en route to final mark; so – swim-off; tt – time trial
