= Swimming at the 2020 European Aquatics Championships – Men's 50 metre butterfly =

Swimming competition

Men's 50 metre butterfly at the 2020 European Aquatics Championships
- Venue: Danube Arena
- Dates: 20 May 2021 (heats and semifinals); 21 May 2021 (final)
- Competitors: 65 from 32 nations
- Winning time: 23.00

Medalists
gold medal	Szebasztián Szabó	Hungary
silver medal	Andriy Govorov	Ukraine
bronze medal	Andrey Zhilkin	Russia

The Men's 50 metre butterfly competition of the 2020 European Aquatics Championships was held on 20 and 21 May 2021.

== Records ==
Before the competition, the existing world, European and championship records were as follows.

	Name	Nation	Time	Location	Date
World record European record	Andriy Govorov	Ukraine	22.27	Rome	1 July 2018
Championship record	Andriy Govorov	Ukraine	22.48	Glasgow	7 August 2018

== Results ==
=== Heats ===
The heats were started on 20 May at 10:44.

Rank	Heat	Lane	Name	Nationality	Time	Notes
1	6	4	Szebasztián Szabó	Hungary	23.03	Q
2	6	5	Andrey Zhilkin	Russia	23.32	Q
3	7	3	Thomas Ceccon	Italy	23.39	Q
3	7	5	Nyls Korstanje	Netherlands	23.39	Q
3	5	4	Andrey Minakov	Russia	23.39	Q
6	7	4	Andriy Govorov	Ukraine	23.41	Q
6	5	6	Maxime Grousset	France	23.41	Q
8	6	6	Konrad Czerniak	Poland	23.44	Q
9	5	1	Thom de Boer	Netherlands	23.45	Q
10	5	5	Vladyslav Bukhov	Ukraine	23.47	Q
11	7	2	Yauhen Tsurkin	Belarus	23.52	Q
12	6	7	Grigori Pekarski	Belarus	23.53	Q
12	5	2	Thomas Verhoeven	Netherlands	23.53	
14	7	1	Florent Manaudou	France	23.54	Q
15	5	7	Meiron Cheruti	Israel	23.55	Q
15	6	3	Daniel Zaitsev	Estonia	23.55	Q
17	5	3	Piero Codia	Italy	23.57	Q
18	7	6	Kristian Golomeev	Greece	23.61	
18	6	2	Mikhail Vekovishchev	Russia	23.61	
20	5	9	Alberto Lozano	Spain	23.65	
21	4	7	Ümitcan Güreş	Turkey	23.67	
21	4	4	Jacob Peters	Great Britain	23.67	
21	6	1	Kristóf Milák	Hungary	23.67	
24	4	9	Paweł Korzeniowski	Poland	23.70	
25	4	2	Jan Šefl	Czech Republic	23.78	
26	6	9	Marcin Cieślak	Poland	23.81	
27	5	8	Niksa Stojkovski	Norway	23.86	
28	7	8	Rasmus Nickelsen	Denmark	23.87	
28	5	0	Deividas Margevičius	Lithuania	23.87	
30	3	4	Simon Bucher	Austria	23.93	
31	7	9	Matteo Rivolta	Italy	23.96	
31	3	1	Heiko Gigler	Austria	23.96	
33	4	5	Niko Mäkelä	Finland	24.02	
34	3	6	Nikola Miljenić	Croatia	24.09	
34	4	6	Péter Holoda	Hungary	24.09	
36	1	7	Robert Glință	Romania	24.13	
37	4	8	Sergii Shevtsov	Ukraine	24.17	
37	6	8	Joeri Verlinden	Netherlands	24.17	
39	4	0	Ivan Lenđer	Serbia	24.18	
40	3	5	Nicholas Lia	Norway	24.20	
41	3	9	Michał Poprawa	Poland	24.21	
42	3	7	Anton Herrala	Finland	24.23	
42	4	3	Liubomyr Lemeshko	Ukraine	24.23	
44	3	8	Ramon Klenz	Germany	24.30	
45	7	0	Julien Henx	Luxembourg	24.35	
46	3	2	Ari-Pekka Liukkonen	Finland	24.39	
47	1	6	Edward Mildred	Great Britain	24.41	
48	2	6	Alex Ahtiainen	Estonia	24.42	
48	3	3	Tomer Frankel	Israel	24.42	
50	4	1	Oskar Hoff	Sweden	24.43	
51	2	4	Ádám Halás	Slovakia	24.45	
52	2	7	Alexander Kudashev	Russia	24.56	
53	3	0	Richárd Márton	Hungary	24.57	
54	2	9	Patrick Johnston	Ireland	24.62	
55	2	3	Martin Espernberger	Austria	24.63	
56	2	2	Bernat Lomero	Andorra	24.82	NR
57	1	4	Stefanos Dimitriadis	Greece	24.83	
58	2	1	Tomàs Lomero	Andorra	24.86	
59	2	5	Sebastian Luňák	Czech Republic	24.89	
60	2	0	Elias Persson	Sweden	25.01	
61	2	8	Xaver Gschwentner	Austria	25.19	
62	1	3	Dado Fenrir Jasminuson	Israel	25.34	
63	1	5	Boško Radulović	Montenegro	25.49	
64	1	2	Ivan Simonovski	North Macedonia	26.17	
65	1	1	Even Qarri	Albania	27.92	
	6	0	Tomoe Zenimoto Hvas	Norway	Did not start	
	7	7	Noè Ponti	Switzerland	Did not start	

=== Semifinals ===
The semifinals were started on 20 May at 18:41.

==== Semifinal 1 ====
Rank	Lane	Name	Nationality	Time	Notes
1	4	Andrey Zhilkin	Russia	23.02	Q
2	5	Nyls Korstanje	Netherlands	23.34	Q
3	8	Piero Codia	Italy	23.35	q
4	6	Konrad Czerniak	Poland	23.36	q
5	3	Maxime Grousset	France	23.39	
5	1	Daniel Zaitsev	Estonia	23.39	
7	7	Grigori Pekarski	Belarus	23.43	
8	2	Vladyslav Bukhov	Ukraine	23.57	

==== Semifinal 2 ====
Rank	Lane	Name	Nationality	Time	Notes
1	6	Andriy Govorov	Ukraine	22.97	Q
2	3	Andrey Minakov	Russia	23.10	Q
2	4	Szebasztián Szabó	Hungary	23.10	Q
4	5	Thomas Ceccon	Italy	23.31	q
5	1	Florent Manaudou	France	23.41	
6	7	Yauhen Tsurkin	Belarus	23.47	
7	2	Thom de Boer	Netherlands	23.51	
8	8	Meiron Cheruti	Israel	23.59	

=== Final ===
The final was held on 21 May at 18:20.

Rank	Lane	Name	Nationality	Time	Notes
1st place, gold medalist(s)	6	Szebasztián Szabó	Hungary	23.00	
2nd place, silver medalist(s)	4	Andriy Govorov	Ukraine	23.01	
3rd place, bronze medalist(s)	5	Andrey Zhilkin	Russia	23.08	
4	8	Konrad Czerniak	Poland	23.09	
5	7	Nyls Korstanje	Netherlands	23.14	
6	3	Andrey Minakov	Russia	23.18	
7	1	Piero Codia	Italy	23.54	
8	2	Thomas Ceccon	Italy	23.56	
