= 2022 FINA World Swimming Championships (25 m) – Men's 50 metre freestyle =

Swimming competition

Men's 50 metre freestyle at the 2022 FINA World Swimming Championships (25 m)
- Venue: Melbourne Sports and Aquatic Centre
- Location: Melbourne, Australia
- Dates: 16 December (heats and semifinals); 17 December (final)
- Competitors: 78 from 70 nations
- Winning time: 20.46

Medalists
gold medal	Jordan Crooks	Cayman Islands
silver medal	Ben Proud	Great Britain
bronze medal	Dylan Carter	Trinidad and Tobago

The Men's 50 metre freestyle competition of the 2022 FINA World Swimming Championships (25 m) was held on 16 and 17 December 2022.

== Records ==
Prior to the competition, the existing world and championship records were as follows.

World record	Caeleb Dressel (USA)	20.16	Budapest, Hungary	21 November 2020
Competition record	Florent Manaudou (FRA)	20.26	Doha, Qatar	5 December 2014

== Results ==
=== Heats ===
The heats were started on 16 December at 12:14.

Rank	Heat	Lane	Name	Nationality	Time	Notes
1	6	3	Jordan Crooks	Cayman Islands	20.36	Q, NR
2	9	4	Dylan Carter	Trinidad and Tobago	20.70	Q, NR
3	11	4	Ben Proud	Great Britain	20.88	Q
4	10	3	Florent Manaudou	France	20.94	Q
4	9	2	Ian Ho	Hong Kong	20.99	Q, NR
6	8	2	Lewis Burras	Great Britain	21.00	Q
6	11	5	Szebasztián Szabó	Hungary	21.00	Q
8	8	5	Michael Andrew	United States	21.02	Q, WD
9	10	4	Kyle Chalmers	Australia	21.09	Q
10	10	6	Vladyslav Bukhov	Ukraine	21.13	Q
10	11	3	Maxime Grousset	France	21.13	Q
12	11	6	Kosuke Matsui	Japan	21.17	Q
12	10	2	Alessandro Miressi	Italy	21.17	Q
14	9	5	Kristian Gkolomeev	Greece	21.21	Q
15	9	7	Leonardo Deplano	Italy	21.25	Q
16	10	8	Matej Duša	Slovakia	21.29	Q, NR
17	10	7	Teong Tzen Wei	Singapore	21.30	Q
18	7	6	Meiron Cheruti	Israel	21.33	
18	9	3	Kenzo Simons	Netherlands	21.33	
18	9	8	Daniel Zaitsev	Estonia	21.33	NR
21	10	5	Thom de Boer	Netherlands	21.35	
22	11	8	Ali Khalafalla	Egypt	21.36	NR
23	7	8	Nikola Miljenić	Croatia	21.37	
24	7	4	David Curtiss	United States	21.40	
25	11	1	Grayson Bell	Australia	21.42	
24	11	7	Heiko Gigler	Austria	21.42	
27	8	3	Nicholas Lia	Norway	21.43	
28	6	2	Lamar Taylor	Bahamas	21.45	NR
29	8	6	Isak Eliasson	Sweden	21.47	
30	8	7	Cameron Gray	New Zealand	21.50	NR
31	7	5	Josha Salchow	Germany	21.52	
32	5	5	Yang Jae-hoon	South Korea	21.54	NR
32	9	6	Karol Ostrowski	Poland	21.54	
34	11	2	Masahiro Kawane	Japan	21.55	
35	7	1	Julien Henx	Luxembourg	21.57	NR
36	7	3	Aleksey Tarasenko	Uzbekistan	21.59	NR
37	8	1	Wang Haoyu	China	21.60	
38	8	8	Mikel Schreuders	Aruba	21.61	NR
39	10	1	Emre Sakçı	Turkey	21.65	
40	7	7	Pieter Coetze	South Africa	21.68	
41	6	4	Illia Linnyk	Ukraine	21.73	
42	8	4	Pedro Spajari	Brazil	21.84	
43	6	5	Xander Skinner	Namibia	21.85	NR
44	6	1	Deniel Nankov	Bulgaria	21.89	
45	5	3	Wu Chun-feng	Chinese Taipei	22.05	
46	5	4	Adi Mešetović	Bosnia and Herzegovina	22.27	
47	6	7	Artur Barseghyan	Armenia	22.30	
48	5	6	Steven Aimable	Senegal	22.42	NR
49	5	2	Hansel McCaig	Fiji	22.61	NR
50	5	7	Bradley Vincent	Mauritius	22.76	
51	6	8	Bernat Lomero	Andorra	22.93	
52	4	3	Issa Al-Adawi	Oman	23.60	
53	5	1	Alassane Seydou	Niger	23.64	
54	5	8	Leon Seaton	Guyana	23.65	NR
55	3	4	Brandon Schuster	Samoa	23.71	
56	1	3	Aryen Muravvej	Suspended Member Federation	24.08	
57	4	1	Mahmoud Abu Gharbieh	Palestine	24.20	
58	4	2	Myagmaryn Delgerkhüü	Mongolia	24.21	
59	4	4	Md Asif Reza	Bangladesh	24.24	
60	4	6	Martin Muja	Kosovo	24.31	
61	4	7	Josh Tarere	Papua New Guinea	24.35	
62	4	8	Clinton Opute	Nigeria	24.47	
63	4	5	Hilal Hilal	Tanzania	24.84	
64	3	2	Cedrick Niyibizi	Rwanda	24.95	
65	9	1	Yuri Kisil	Canada	25.14	
66	2	8	Shahbaz Khan	Pakistan	25.16	
67	3	6	Travis Sakurai	Palau	25.57	
68	3	2	Yann Douma	Republic of the Congo	26.33	
69	3	7	Kyler Kihleng	Federated States of Micronesia	26.47	
70	1	5	Ezuldeen Qatat	Libya	26.52	
71	3	3	Edgar Iro	Solomon Islands	26.62	
72	1	6	Pap Jonga	Gambia	26.73	
73	3	1	Phillip Kinono	Marshall Islands	26.86	
74	3	8	Fahim Anwari	Afghanistan	27.30	
75	1	4	Cameron Jele	Eswatini	28.23	
76	2	3	Jolanio Guterres	Timor-Leste	29.09	
77	2	6	Sheku Bangura	Sierra Leone	29.38	
78	2	2	Magnim Daou	Togo	30.39	
	2	1	Terence Tengue	Central African Republic	Did not start	
	2	4	Fodé Camara	Guinea	Did not start	
	2	5	Hakim Youssouf	Comoros	Did not start	
	2	7	Hugo Nguichie	Cameroon	Did not start	
	6	6	Sina Gholampour	Iran	Did not start	
	7	2	Sergio de Celis	Spain	Did not start	

=== Semifinals ===
The semifinals were started on 16 December at 20:41.

Rank	Heat	Lane	Name	Nationality	Time	Notes
1	2	4	Jordan Crooks	Cayman Islands	20.31	Q, NR
2	2	5	Ben Proud	Great Britain	20.76	Q
3	2	6	Szebasztián Szabó	Hungary	20.83	Q
4	1	6	Kyle Chalmers	Australia	20.91	Q
5	1	3	Lewis Burras	Great Britain	20.94	Q
5	1	4	Dylan Carter	Trinidad and Tobago	20.94	Q
7	1	5	Florent Manaudou	France	20.95	Q
8	1	2	Maxime Grousset	France	20.97	Q
9	2	3	Ian Ho	Hong Kong	21.04	
10	2	1	Kristian Gkolomeev	Greece	21.08	
11	1	8	Teong Tzen Wei	Singapore	21.09	NR
12	1	1	Leonardo Deplano	Italy	21.12	
13	2	7	Alessandro Miressi	Italy	21.13	
14	2	2	Vladyslav Bukhov	Ukraine	21.29	
15	2	8	Matej Duša	Slovakia	21.35	
16	1	7	Kosuke Matsui	Japan	21.42	

=== Final ===
The final was held on 17 December at 21:39.

Rank	Lane	Name	Nationality	Time	Notes
1st place, gold medalist(s)	4	Jordan Crooks	Cayman Islands	20.46	
2nd place, silver medalist(s)	5	Ben Proud	Great Britain	20.49	
3rd place, bronze medalist(s)	7	Dylan Carter	Trinidad and Tobago	20.72	
4	3	Szebasztián Szabó	Hungary	20.84	
5	8	Maxime Grousset	France	20.90	
6	1	Florent Manaudou	France	20.91	
7	6	Kyle Chalmers	Australia	20.92	
8	2	Lewis Burras	Great Britain	20.95	
