= Andrey Zhilkin =

Russian swimmer (born 1995)

Personal information
- Nationality: Russian
- Born: 9 March 1995 (age 31) Kuala Lumpur, Malaysia
- Height: 1.95 m (6 ft 5 in)
- Weight: 85 kg (187 lb)

Sport
- Sport: Swimming
- Strokes: Freestyle
- Coach: Sergey Zhilkin
Medal record
European Championships (LC)
Gold medal – first place	2018 Glasgow	4×100 m freestyle
Gold medal – first place	2020 Budapest	4×100 m freestyle
Bronze medal – third place	2020 Budapest	50 m butterfly

Andrey Zhilkin (born 9 March 1995) is a Russian swimmer. He competed in the men's 4 × 100 metre freestyle relay event at the 2018 European Aquatics Championships, winning the gold medal.
