= Dylan Carter (swimmer) =

Trinidad and Tobago swimmer (born 1996)

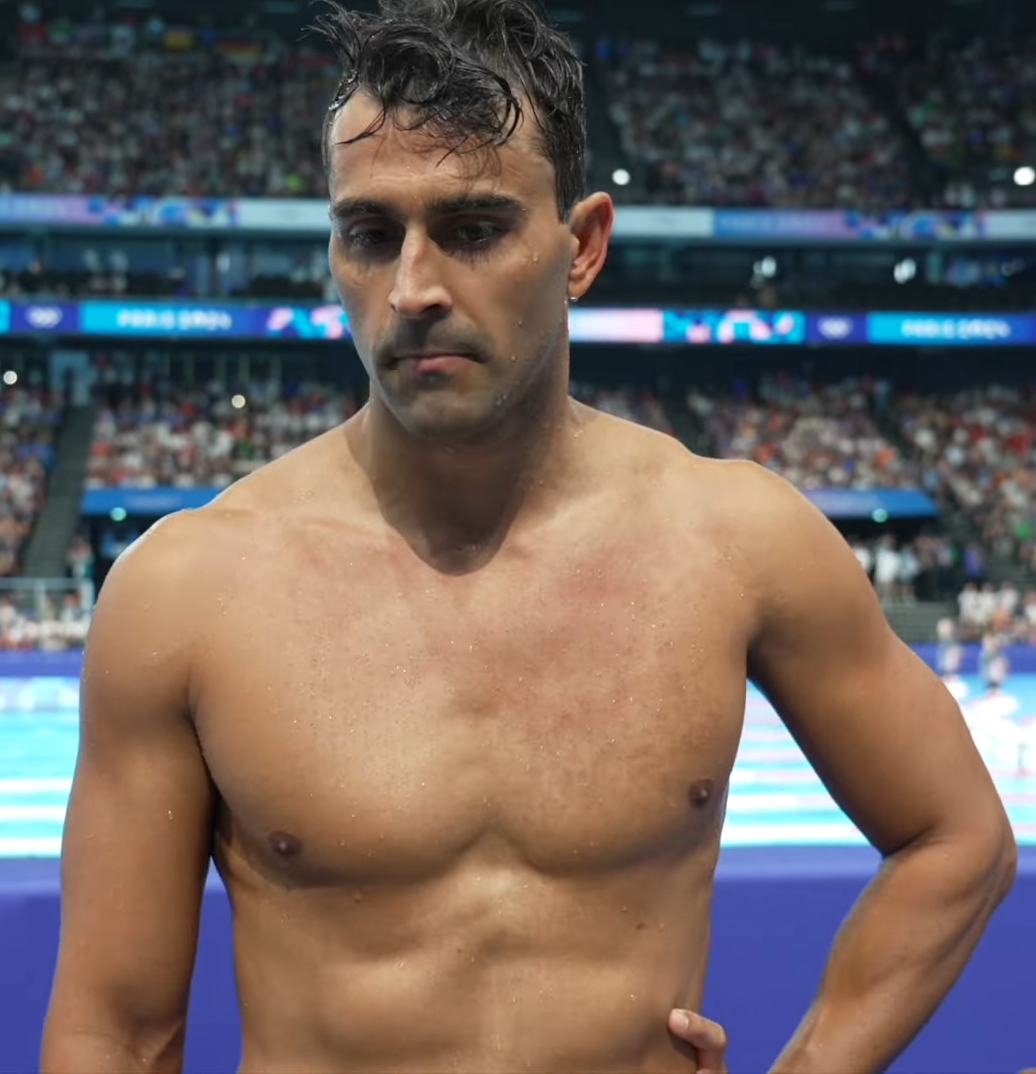
- Carter at an interview at the Olympic Games in Paris in 2024

Personal information
- Nationality: American, Trinidad and Tobago
- Born: 30 January 1996 (age 30) Santa Clarita, California, U.S.
- Height: 1.93 m (6 ft 4 in)
- Weight: 91 kg (201 lb)

Sport
- Country: Trinidad and Tobago
- Sport: Swimming
- Event(s): Backstroke, butterfly, freestyle
- College team: University of Southern California
- Coached by: Dave Salo

Achievements and titles
- World finals: 2016 (x2), 2018 (x2)
- Personal best: 100m Freestyle (LCM): 48.52 (2019) 200m Freestyle (SCM): 1:42.47 (2016)
Medal record
Men's swimming
Representing Trinidad and Tobago
World Championships (SC)
Silver medal – second place	2021 Abu Dhabi	50 m butterfly
Bronze medal – third place	2018 Hangzhou	50 m butterfly
Bronze medal – third place	2022 Melbourne	50 m freestyle
Commonwealth Games
Silver medal – second place	2018 Gold Coast	50 m butterfly
Pan American Games
Bronze medal – third place	2019 Lima	100 m backstroke
World Junior Championships
Silver medal – second place	2013 Dubai	50 m butterfly
Summer Youth Olympics
Silver medal – second place	2014 Nanjing	50 m butterfly
Bronze medal – third place	2014 Nanjing	50 m freestyle
Central American and Caribbean Games
Gold medal – first place	2018 Barranquilla	100 m freestyle
Gold medal – first place	2023 San Salvador	100 m freestyle
Gold medal – first place	2018 Barranquilla	50 m butterfly
Gold medal – first place	2023 Barranquilla	50 m butterfly
Gold medal – first place	2018 Barranquilla	50 m backstroke
Gold medal – first place	2023 San Salvador	50 m freestyle
Silver medal – second place	2018 Barranquilla	50 m freestyle
Silver medal – second place	2023 San Salvador	50 m backstroke
Bronze medal – third place	2018 Barranquilla	4×100 m freestyle
Bronze medal – third place	2023 San Salvador	4x100 m freestyle
Representing the USC Trojans
NCAA Championships
Gold medal – first place	2015 Iowa City	4×100 y freestyle
Gold medal – first place	2015 Iowa City	4×200 y freestyle
Gold medal – first place	2018 Minneapolis	4×50 y medley
Silver medal – second place	2017 Indianapolis	200 y freestyle
Bronze medal – third place	2017 Indianapolis	4×100 y freestyle
Bronze medal – third place	2018 Minneapolis	4×100 y medley

Dylan Carter (born 30 January 1996) is a competitive swimmer. Born in the United States, he represents Trinidad and Tobago internationally. He is the Trinidad and Tobago record holder in the long course and short course 100 metre freestyle, 50 metre backstroke, 100 metre backstroke, 50 metre butterfly, and 100 metre butterfly. At the 2021 World Short Course Championships, he became the first swimmer representing Trinidad and Tobago to win a silver medal a World Short Course Championships, winning the silver medal in the 50 metre butterfly. In 2018 and 2022, he won the bronze medal in the 50 metre butterfly and the 50 metre freestyle at the World Short Course Championships, respectively. He was the male overall winner for the 2022 FINA Swimming World Cup, winning nine gold medals, five in Trinidad and Tobago record times, to become the first Trinidad and Tobago overall winner. He is of Portuguese descent.

== International career ==
=== 2016–2018 ===
Carter competed at the 2016 Summer Olympics in Rio de Janeiro, in the men's 100 metre freestyle. Later in 2016, Carter competed at the FINA Short Course World Championships where he made the final in the 200m freestyle and finished 4th. He also finaled in the 50m butterfly where he finished 7th. Carter won the silver medal at the 2018 Commonwealth Games in the 50 m butterfly. Collegiately, he competed for the University of Southern California under head coach Dave Salo where he won 4 NCAA titles as a part of USCs relay team.

=== 2019: Backstroke on the rise ===
==== 2019 World Championships ====
In July 2019 at the 2019 World Aquatics Championships, which took place in Gwangju, South Korea, Carter and Simone Sabbioni of Italy had wedge equipment malfunction during their starts in the 100 metre backstroke. Officials required Carter and Sabbioni to re-swim the race alone, one at a time, after the malfunction was ruled due to the wedge apparatus failure if they wanted to compete in the semifinals. In his re-swim, Carter advanced to the semifinals with his time of 54.03 seconds where he placed 16th overall with a time of 54.08 seconds.

=== 2021: Butterfly national records ===
==== 2020 Summer Olympics ====
At the 2020 Summer Olympics in Tokyo, Japan and held in July and August 2021 due to the COVID-19 pandemic, Carter competed in four individual events. In the 100 metre butterfly, Carter ranked 33rd and set a new national record with his time of 52.36 seconds. For his other three individual events, Carter ranked 33rd in the 50 metre freestyle with a time of 22.46 seconds, 22nd in the 100 metre freestyle with a 48.66, and 32nd in the 100 metre backstroke in a time of 54.82 seconds.

==== International Swimming League ====
During match nine of the 2021 International Swimming League in Naples, Italy, Carter took third place in the short course 50 metre butterfly with a time of 22.36, which broke the Trinidad and Tobago national record in the event he had previously set at 22.38 seconds in 2018.

==== 2021 World Short Course Championships ====
2021 World Championships (SC)
Silver medal – second place	50 m butterfly	21.98 (NR)

On 20 December 2021, Carter won the silver medal in the 50 metre butterfly in a Trinidad and Tobago record time of 21.98 seconds at the 2021 World Short Course Championships held at Etihad Arena in Abu Dhabi, United Arab Emirates. His silver medal was the first medal other than a bronze medal to be won by a swimmer representing Trinidad and Tobago at a World Short Course Championships. He also placed ninth in the semifinals of the 100 metre butterfly with a Trinidad and Tobago record time of 49.87 seconds. For his accomplishments, Carter received congratulations from the Trinidad and Tobago Minister of Sport and Community Development, Shamfa Cudjoe.

=== 2022 ===
==== 2022 World Aquatics Championships ====
At the 2022 World Aquatics Championships, held at Danube Arena in Budapest, Hungary with swimming competition in June, Carter placed fourth in the 50 metre butterfly with a Trinidad and Tobago record time of 22.85 seconds and place fourteenth in the 100 metre freestyle with a Trinidad and Tobago record time of 48.30 seconds.

==== 2022 Swimming World Cup ====
At the first stop of the 2022 FINA Swimming World Cup, in Berlin, Germany, Carter won the gold medal in the 50 metre freestyle with a Trinidad and Tobago record time of 20.77 seconds, finishing 0.27 seconds ahead of silver medalist Kyle Chalmers of Australia and 0.28 seconds ahead of bronze medalist Florent Manaudou of France. The following day, he won the gold medal in the 50 metre backstroke with a Trinidad and Tobago record and personal best time of 23.15 seconds, finishing 0.07 seconds ahead of silver medalist Thomas Ceccon of Italy. Day three, he won a third gold medal, this time finishing first in the 50 metre butterfly with a 22.13, which was less than one-tenth of a second ahead of silver medalist Chad le Clos of South Africa. His scores across all of his events in Berlin ranked him as the second highest-scoring male competitor with 57.3 points, which was only 1.0 point behind first-ranked Matthew Sates of South Africa.

For the 50 metre freestyle on day one of the second stop of the World Cup circuit, starting 28 October in Toronto, Canada, Carter won the gold medal with a time of 20.91 seconds, which was less than two-tenths of a second ahead of silver medalist Brooks Curry of the United States and bronze medalist Kyle Chalmers. The following day, he won the gold medal in the 50 metre backstroke with a Trinidad and Tobago record time of 22.94 seconds, lowering his record mark from the first stop by over two-tenths of a second. In the same session, approximately 30 minutes later, he placed fourth in the final of the 100 metre freestyle with a Trinidad and Tobago record time of 46.36 seconds. He brought his medal count for the World Cup to six gold medals on the third and final day in Toronto, winning the gold medal in the 50 metre butterfly with a time of 22.28 seconds, which was less than four-tenths of a second ahead of silver medalist Chad le Clos and bronze medalist Thomas Ceccon.

Starting off the third and final stop, held in Indianapolis, United States with competition commencing on 3 November, Carter won a gold medal in the 50 metre freestyle in a Trinidad and Tobago record time of 20.72 seconds, the medal marked his seventh gold medal of the circuit. The next day, he finished in a Trinidad and Tobago record, US Open record, and personal best time of 22.72 seconds in the final of the 50 metre backstroke to win the gold medal, a time which was 0.22 seconds faster than his previous best mark and 0.11 seconds slower than the World Cup record of 22.61 seconds set in 2009 by Peter Marshall of the United States. Day three of three, he won the gold medal in the 50 metre butterfly with a US Open record time of 21.99 seconds. His win brought his final score across all three stops of the 2022 World Cup to 172.6 points for his nine gold medals spanning freestyle, backstroke, and butterfly, which earned him the title of overall male winner, highest scoring competitor from any country and across all strokes, for the year. He was the first swimmer representing Trinidad and Tobago in competition, and first Caribbean Islands swimmer, to win an overall title.

==== 2022 World Short Course Championships ====
2022 World Championships (SC)
Bronze medal – third place	50 m freestyle	20.72

In December, at the 2022 World Short Course Championships in Melbourne, Australia, Carter commenced competition with a 22.11 in the preliminaries of the 50 metre butterfly on day one, qualifying for the semifinals later in the day ranking fourth. He lowered his time to a 22.02 in the evening semifinals, qualifying for the final ranking second. The following evening, he finished in a time of 22.14 seconds in the final to place sixth. For the preliminaries of the 50 metre backstroke on day three, he ranked fourth and advanced to the final with a time of 23.07 seconds. Later in the day, he tied Lorenzo Mora of Italy for firth-rank in the semifinals with a time of 22.90 seconds and both qualified for the final.

On day four, Carter achieved a Trinidad and Tobago record time of 20.70 seconds in the preliminaries of the 50 metre freestyle and qualified for the evening semifinals ranking second. In the evening session for the day, he started off with a seventh-place finish in the final of the 50 metre backstroke in a time of 23.12 seconds. He concluded the evening session in a tie for fifth-rank with Lewis Burras of Great Britain in the semifinals of the 50 metre freestyle with a time of 20.94 seconds. He won the first medal of the competition for Trinidad and Tobago in the final, finishing third in a time of 20.72 seconds to win the bronze medal.

=== 2023 ===
At the 2023 TYR Pro Swim Series in March in Fort Lauderdale, United States, Carter won the gold medal with a personal best and Trinidad and Tobago record time of 48.28 seconds.

== International championships (50 m) ==
Meet	50 freestyle	100 freestyle	200 freestyle	400 freestyle	50 backstroke	100 backstroke	50 butterfly	100 butterfly	4×100 freestyle
Junior level
WJC 2013	15th	5th (h)	5th (h)		8th	4th	2nd place, silver medalist(s)		
YOG 2014	3rd place, bronze medalist(s)	DNS					2nd place, silver medalist(s)		
Senior level
CG 2014		5th	13th	18th				16th	
PAN 2015	8th	4th			—N/a		—N/a	13th (h)	
WC 2015	32nd	24th				33rd	15th	DNS	
OG 2016		23rd			—N/a		—N/a		
WC 2017		18th	24th				19th	28th	
CG 2018		5th					2nd place, silver medalist(s)		
CAC 2018	2nd place, silver medalist(s)	1st place, gold medalist(s)			1st place, gold medalist(s)		1st place, gold medalist(s)		3rd place, bronze medalist(s)
WC 2019	41st	12th				16th	13th		
PAN 2019	9th		4th		—N/a	3rd place, bronze medalist(s)	—N/a		
OG 2020	33rd	22nd			—N/a	32nd	—N/a	33rd	
WC 2022	17th	14th					4th		
CG 2022	4th				15th		4th		

== International championships (25 m) ==
Meet	50 freestyle	100 freestyle	200 freestyle	50 backstroke	100 backstroke	50 butterfly	100 butterfly
WC 2016		DNS	4th		DNS	7th	
WC 2018	34th	DNS	12th	7th		3rd place, bronze medalist(s)	
WC 2021		DNS				2nd place, silver medalist(s)	9th
WC 2022	3rd place, bronze medalist(s)			7th		6th	

== Personal best times ==
=== Long course metres (50 m pool) ===
Event	Time		Meet	Location	Date	Notes	Ref
50 m freestyle	21.91	h, so	2022 World Aquatics Championships	Budapest, Hungary	23 June 2022		
100 m freestyle	48.28		2023 TYR Pro Swim Series - Fort Lauderdale	Fort Lauderdale, United States	2 March 2023	NR	
50 m backstroke	24.83		2018 Central American and Caribbean Games	Barranquilla, Colombia	24 July 2018	NR	
100 m backstroke	54.03	h	2019 World Aquatics Championships	Gwangju, South Korea	22 July 2019	NR	
50 m butterfly	22.85		2022 World Aquatics Championships	Budapest, Hungary	19 June 2022	NR	
100 m butterfly	52.36	h	2020 Summer Olympics	Tokyo, Japan	29 July 2021	NR	

Legend: NR – Trinidad and Tobago record;
Records not set in finals: h – heat; sf – semifinal; r – relay 1st leg; rh – relay heat 1st leg; b – B final; † – en route to final mark; so – swim-off; tt – time trial

=== Short course metres (25 m pool) ===
Event	Time		Meet	Location	Date	Notes	Ref
50 m freestyle	20.70	h	2022 World Short Course Championships	Melbourne, Australia	16 December 2022	NR	
100 m freestyle	46.36		2022 Swimming World Cup	Toronto, Canada	29 October 2022	NR	
50 m backstroke	22.72		2022 Swimming World Cup	Indianapolis, United States	4 November 2022	NR, US	
100 m backstroke	49.91		2020 International Swimming League	Budapest, Hungary	22 November 2020	NR	
50 m butterfly	21.98		2021 World Short Course Championships	Abu Dhabi, United Arab Emirates	20 December 2021	NR	
100 m butterfly	49.87	sf	2021 World Short Course Championships	Abu Dhabi, United Arab Emirates	17 December 2021	NR	

Legend: NR – Trinidad and Tobago record; US – U.S. Open record;
Records not set in finals: h – heat; sf – semifinal; r – relay 1st leg; rh – relay heat 1st leg; b – B final; † – en route to final mark; so – swim-off; tt – time trial

== Swimming World Cup circuits ==
The following medals Carter has won at Swimming World Cup circuits.

Edition	Gold medals	Silver medals	Bronze medals	Total
2022	9	0	0	9
Total	9	0	0	9

== Awards ==
- SwimSwam Swammy Award Central American and Caribbean Athlete of the Year (male): 2018, 2020, 2021

Sporting positions
Preceded by (South Africa) Matthew Sates	FINA Swimming World Cup; Overall male winner 2022	Succeeded by Incumbent
