= Szebasztián Szabó =

Serbian-Hungarian swimmer (born 1996)

Personal information
- Nationality: Hungarian/Serbian
- Born: 11 March 1996 (age 30) Frankfurt am Main, Germany
- Height: 1.91 m (6 ft 3 in)
- Weight: 93 kg (205 lb)

Sport
- Sport: Swimming
- Strokes: Butterfly, freestyle
- Club: Győri Úszó SE
Medal record
Men's swimming
Event	1st	2nd	3rd
World Championships (SC)	0	0	1
European Championships (LC)	2	1	0
European Championships (SC)	3	4	1
Total	5	5	2
Representing Serbia
European Championships (SC)
Bronze medal – third place	2017 Copenhagen	50 m butterfly
Representing Hungary
World Championships (SC)
Bronze medal – third place	2022 Melbourne	50 m butterfly
European Championships (LC)
Gold medal – first place	2020 Budapest	50 m butterfly
Gold medal – first place	2024 Belgrade	4×100 m mixed freestyle
Gold medal – first place	2026 Paris	4×100 m freestyle
Silver medal – second place	2022 Rome	4×100 m freestyle
European Championships (SC)
Gold medal – first place	2021 Kazan	50 m freestyle
Gold medal – first place	2021 Kazan	50 m butterfly
Gold medal – first place	2021 Kazan	100 m butterfly
Silver medal – second place	2019 Glasgow	50 m butterfly
Silver medal – second place	2019 Glasgow	4×50 m medley
Silver medal – second place	2023 Otopeni	50 m freestyle
Silver medal – second place	2023 Otopeni	50 m butterfly
Silver medal – second place	2025 Lublin	50 m butterfly
Silver medal – second place	2025 Lublin	4×50 m mixed freestyle
Representing Hungary
Men's lifesaving
World Games
Gold medal – first place	2022 Birmingham	4x50 m obstacle
Gold medal – first place	2022 Birmingham	4x50 m medley
Men's finswimming
World Games
Gold medal – first place	2025 Chengdu	50 m bi-fins
Silver medal – second place	2025 Chengdu	100 m bi-fins

Szebasztián Szabó (Serbian: Себастијан Сабо, romanized: Sebastijan Sabo; born 11 March 1996) is a Hungarian swimmer. He was a world record holder in the short course 50 metre butterfly (2021 – 2024). He competed in the men's 50 metre butterfly event at the 2017 World Aquatics Championships representing Serbia. In 2019, Szabó was member of the 2019 International Swimming League representing Team Iron. The same year he chose represent Hungary in the future, which was granted by FINA.

== Career ==
=== 2021 European Short Course Championships ===
2021 European Championships
Gold medal – first place	50 m freestyle	20.72
Gold medal – first place	100 m butterfly	49.68
Gold medal – first place	50 m butterfly	21.75 (WR)

In the final of the 50 metre butterfly at the 2021 European Short Course Swimming Championships, held at the Palace of Water Sports in Kazan, Russia, Szabó achieved a world record, European record, Championships record, and a Hungarian record with a time of 21.75 seconds that tied the world record set by Nicholas Santos of Brazil in 2018 and earned Szabó the gold medal in the event. Earlier in the Championships, Szabó won his first medal, a gold medal, in the 100 metre butterfly with a time of 49.68 seconds. He also won the gold medal with a time of 20.72 seconds in the 50 metre freestyle, which marked the first time in the history of the European Short Course Swimming Championships that a Hungarian swimmer had won the gold medal in the event. Szabó tying the 50 metre butterfly world record and Ilya Shymanovich of Belarus tying the 50 metre breaststroke world record earned the number one spot from Swimming World for their "The Week That Was" honor for the week of 8 November 2021.

=== 2021 World Short Course Championships ===
For the 2021 World Short Course Championships in Abu Dhabi, United Arab Emirates, Szabó entered to compete in four individual events, the 50 metre freestyle, 100 metre freestyle, 50 metre butterfly, and 100 metre butterfly. In his first individual event, the 100 metre butterfly, Szabó ranked 25th in the prelims heats on day two and did not qualify for the semifinals with his time of 51.25 seconds. On day three of competition, Szabó ranked 13th in the prelims heats of the 50 metre freestyle with a time of 21.46 seconds and qualified for the semifinals later the same day. For the semifinals Szabó ranked sixth with a time of 21.06 seconds, qualifying for the final the following day. In the prelims heats of the 50 metre butterfly on day four, Szabó qualified for the semifinals ranking third with a 22.42. Szabó ranked first in the semifinals in the evening, swimming a 22.11 and qualifying for the final. Later in the same session, Szabó placed seventh in the final of the 50 metre freestyle with a time of 21.26 seconds. Szabó decided not to swim in the prelims heats of the 100 metre freestyle on day five. Later in the day he placed fourth in the final of the 50 metre butterfly with a time of 22.14 seconds.

=== 2022 ===
In October 2022, Szabó was announced as the only male swimmer on the Team Hungary roster for the 2022 World Short Course Championships, to be held in December in Melbourne, Australia. The following month, during the first two days of competition at the 2022 Hungarian National Short Course Championships in Kaposvár, he won the national title in the 50 metre freestyle with a time of 21.01, the silver medal in the 100 metre freestyle, where he finished in a time of 47.07 seconds and only behind first-place finisher Kristóf Milák, and the gold medal in the 50 metre backstroke. Day three, he won the gold medal in the 50 metre butterfly with a time of 22.05 seconds. On the fourth and final day, he placed second in the final of the 100 metre butterfly with a time of 50.21 seconds.

== World records ==
=== Short course metres (25 m pool) ===
No.	Event	Time		Meet	Location	Date	Age	Status	Notes	Ref
1	50 m butterfly	21.75	=	2021 European Short Course Championships	Kazan, Russia	6 November 2021	25	Former	ER, NR	

Legend: WR – World record; ER – European record; NR – Hungarian record;
Records not set in finals: h – heat; sf – semifinal; r – relay 1st leg; rh – relay heat 1st leg; b – B final; † – en route to final mark; so – swim-off; tt – time trial

== Awards and honours ==
- Swimming World, The Week That Was: 8 November 2021 (#1)

== See also ==
- List of European Aquatics Championships medalists in swimming (men)
- List of European Short Course Swimming Championships medalists (men)

Records
Preceded by (Brazil) Nicholas Santos	Men's 50-metre butterfly world record holder (short course); 6 November 2021 – 20 October 2024 with Nicholas Santos	Succeeded by (Switzerland) Noè Ponti
