= 2021 FINA World Swimming Championships (25 m) – Men's 100 metre butterfly =

Swimming competition

Men's 100 metre butterfly at the 2021 FINA World Swimming Championships (25 m)
- Venue: Etihad Arena
- Location: Abu Dhabi, United Arab Emirates
- Dates: 17 December (heats and semifinals); 18 December (final)
- Competitors: 83 from 75 nations
- Winning time: 48.87

Medalists
gold medal	Matteo Rivolta	Italy
silver medal	Chad le Clos	South Africa
bronze medal	Andrey Minakov

The Men's 100 metre butterfly competition of the 2021 FINA World Swimming Championships (25 m) was held on 17 and 18 December 2021.

== Records ==
Prior to the competition, the existing world and championship records were as follows.

World record	Caeleb Dressel (USA)	47.78	Budapest, Hungary	21 November 2020
Competition record	Chad le Clos (RSA)	48.08	Windsor, Canada	8 December 2016

== Results ==
=== Heats ===
The heats were started on 17 December at 10:23.

Rank	Heat	Lane	Name	Nationality	Time	Notes
1	7	1	Noè Ponti	Switzerland	49.49	Q, NR
2	9	8	Andrey Minakov	Russian Swimming Federation	49.60	Q
3	6	6	Youssef Ramadan	Egypt	49.66	Q, NR
4	7	4	Matteo Rivolta	Italy	49.82	Q
5	9	1	Nyls Korstanje	Netherlands	49.97	Q
6	6	4	Joshua Liendo	Canada	50.00	Q, NR
7	7	3	Vinicius Lanza	Brazil	50.11	Q
8	5	3	Dylan Carter	Trinidad and Tobago	50.22	Q, NR
9	5	6	Nikola Miljenić	Croatia	50.23	Q, NR
10	9	3	Jakub Majerski	Poland	50.40	Q
11	9	4	Chad le Clos	South Africa	50.47	Q
12	9	2	Antani Ivanov	Bulgaria	50.49	Q
13	8	5	Tomoe Hvas	Norway	50.51	Q
14	8	2	Simon Bucher	Austria	50.53	Q
14	8	3	Michele Lamberti	Italy	50.53	Q
16	8	4	Tom Shields	United States	50.57	Q
17	9	5	Marcin Cieślak	Poland	50.79	
18	7	2	José Ángel Martínez	Mexico	50.80	
19	7	6	Roman Shevliakov	Russian Swimming Federation	50.87	
20	6	7	Sun Jiajun	China	50.92	
21	9	7	Jan Šefl	Czech Republic	50.99	
22	9	9	Armin Evert Lelle	Estonia	51.10	
23	8	6	Grigori Pekarski	Belarus	51.22	
24	5	2	Adilbek Mussin	Kazakhstan	51.23	NR
25	7	5	Szebasztián Szabó	Hungary	51.25	
26	8	8	Edward Mildred	United Kingdom	51.26	
27	8	7	Daniel Zaitsev	Estonia	51.30	
28	6	3	Wang Changhao	China	51.32	
28	6	8	Santiago Grassi	Argentina	51.32	NR
30	9	0	Deividas Margevičius	Lithuania	51.57	
31	5	9	Sajan Prakash	India	51.61	NR
32	8	0	Fernando da Silva	Portugal	51.64	
33	8	1	Michael Andrew	United States	51.69	
34	7	7	Leonardo Coelho Santos	Brazil	51.73	
35	8	9	Brendan Hyland	Ireland	51.79	
36	4	3	Mehrshad Afghari	Iran	51.87	NR
37	6	2	Ádám Halás	Slovakia	51.95	
38	7	9	Louis Croenen	Belgium	52.11	
39	7	8	Ramon Klenz	Germany	52.15	
40	6	1	Moon Seung-woo	South Korea	52.36	
41	5	5	Navaphat Wongcharoen	Thailand	52.50	
42	1	8	Eldor Usmonov	Uzbekistan	52.53	
43	7	0	Thomas Verhoeven	Netherlands	52.60	
44	6	9	Thomas Piron	France	52.66	
45	4	5	Ben Hockin	Paraguay	52.86	
46	5	7	Jorge Otaiza	Venezuela	52.93	
47	4	4	Denys Kesil	Ukraine	52.96	
48	5	1	Alberto Puertas	Peru	52.98	
49	5	4	Waleed Abdulrazzaq	Kuwait	53.22	
50	5	8	Glenn Victor Sutanto	Indonesia	53.32	
51	1	1	Jesse Ssengonzi	Uganda	53.64	NR
52	5	0	Ho Tin Long	Hong Kong	53.66	
53	4	2	Steven Aimable	Senegal	53.69	
54	3	1	Carlos Vásquez	Honduras	53.91	NR
55	4	1	Samy Boutouil	Morocco	53.93	NR
56	4	6	Yousuf Al-Matrooshi	United Arab Emirates	54.22	
57	3	6	José Quintanilla	Bolivia	54.38	
58	3	2	Ramil Valizade	Azerbaijan	54.39	
59	3	9	Denzel González	Dominican Republic	54.43	NR
60	2	4	Seggio Bernardina	Curaçao	54.45	
61	3	3	Luis Vega Torres	Cuba	54.46	
62	4	0	Tomàs Lomero	Andorra	54.48	NR
63	3	8	Hồ Nguyễn Duy Khoa	Vietnam	54.63	
64	3	5	Salvador Gordo	Angola	54.99	
65	4	9	Ziyad Al-Salous	Jordan	55.14	
66	3	7	Mathieu Bachmann	Seychelles	55.43	
67	1	6	Mathew Bennici	Cambodia	55.60	NR
68	4	7	Yousif Bu Arish	Saudi Arabia	55.65	
69	3	4	Cherantha de Silva	Sri Lanka	56.33	
70	3	0	Tameea Elhamayda	Qatar	56.61	
71	1	7	Liam Henry	Cayman Islands	56.62	
72	2	6	Finau Ohuafi	Tonga	57.13	
73	2	1	Batmönkhiin Jürmed	Mongolia	57.20	
74	2	2	Johnpaul Balloqui	Gibraltar	57.54	
75	2	3	Collins Saliboko	Tanzania	58.08	
76	2	7	Belly-Cresus Ganira	Burundi	58.48	
77	2	5	Stefan Cvetkoski	North Macedonia	58.91	
78	2	8	Raekwon Noel	Guyana	1:00.25	
79	1	5	Kinley Lhendup	Bhutan	1:01.07	
80	1	2	Azhar Abbas	Pakistan	1:02.35	
80	1	3	Fakhriddin Madkamov	Tajikistan	1:02.35	
82	2	9	Tilahun Malede	Ethiopia	1:09.15	
83	2	0	ElhadjN'Gnane Diallo	Guinea	1:12.52	
	4	8	Philip Adejumo	Nigeria	DNS	
	6	0	Jaouad Syoud	Algeria	DNS	
	6	5	Hugo González	Spain	DNS	
	9	6	Teong Tzen Wei	Singapore	DNS	
	1	4	Mahmoud Abu Gharbieh	Palestine	DNS	

=== Semifinals ===
The semifinals were started on 17 December at 19:26.

Rank	Heat	Lane	Name	Nationality	Time	Notes
1	1	5	Matteo Rivolta	Italy	49.07	Q
2	2	7	Chad le Clos	South Africa	49.56	Q
3	2	5	Youssef Ramadan	Egypt	49.60	Q, NR
4	2	4	Noè Ponti	Switzerland	49.62	Q
5	1	2	Jakub Majerski	Poland	49.65	Q
6	1	1	Simon Bucher	Austria	49.70	Q, NR
7	1	8	Tom Shields	United States	49.76	Q
8	1	4	Andrey Minakov	Russian Swimming Federation	49.79	Q
9	1	6	Dylan Carter	Trinidad and Tobago	49.87	NR
10	2	6	Vinicius Lanza	Brazil	49.97	
11	2	3	Nyls Korstanje	Netherlands	50.11	
12	2	8	Michele Lamberti	Italy	50.12	
13	2	1	Tomoe Hvas	Norway	50.13	
14	1	3	Joshua Liendo	Canada	50.29	
15	1	7	Antani Ivanov	Bulgaria	50.30	
16	2	2	Nikola Miljenić	Croatia	50.58	

=== Final ===
The final was held on 18 December at 18:07.

Rank	Lane	Name	Nationality	Time	Notes
1st place, gold medalist(s)	4	Matteo Rivolta	Italy	48.87	
2nd place, silver medalist(s)	5	Chad le Clos	South Africa	49.04	
3rd place, bronze medalist(s)	8	Andrey Minakov	Russian Swimming Federation	49.21	
4	3	Youssef Ramadan	Egypt	49.50	NR
5	6	Noè Ponti	Switzerland	49.59	
6	1	Tom Shields	United States	49.80	
7	7	Simon Bucher	Austria	49.82	
8	2	Jakub Majerski	Poland	49.89	
