= 2021 FINA World Swimming Championships (25 m) – Men's 50 metre butterfly =

Swimming competition

Men's 50 metre butterfly at the 2021 FINA World Swimming Championships (25 m)
- Venue: Etihad Arena
- Location: Abu Dhabi, United Arab Emirates
- Dates: 19 December (heats and semifinals); 20 December (final)
- Competitors: 84 from 77 nations
- Winning time: 21.93

Medalists
gold medal	Nicholas Santos	Brazil
silver medal	Dylan Carter	Trinidad and Tobago
bronze medal	Matteo Rivolta	Italy

The Men's 50 metre butterfly competition of the 2021 FINA World Swimming Championships (25 m) was held on 19 and 20 December 2021.

== Records ==
Prior to the competition, the existing world and championship records were as follows.

World record	Nicholas Santos (BRA) Szebasztián Szabó (HUN)	21.75	Budapest, Hungary Kazan, Russia	6 October 2018 6 November 2021
Competition record	Nicholas Santos (BRA)	21.81	Hangzhou, China	15 December 2018

== Results ==
=== Heats ===
The heats were started on 19 December at 09:52.

Rank	Heat	Lane	Name	Nationality	Time	Notes
1	9	3	Dylan Carter	Trinidad and Tobago	22.36	Q
2	8	3	Nyls Korstanje	Netherlands	22.40	Q
3	10	4	Szebasztián Szabó	Hungary	22.42	Q
4	6	1	Joshua Liendo	Canada	22.52	Q, WD, NR
4	7	6	Noè Ponti	Switzerland	22.52	Q, NR
6	10	5	Matteo Rivolta	Italy	22.53	Q
7	10	7	Grigori Pekarski	Belarus	22.62	Q
8	6	6	Sun Jiajun	China	22.64	Q, NR
9	9	4	Nicholas Santos	Brazil	22.66	Q
10	10	6	Daniel Zaitsev	Estonia	22.72	Q
11	7	8	Abdelrahman Sameh	Egypt	22.76	Q, NR
12	9	6	Roman Shevliakov	Russian Swimming Federation	22.79	Q
13	9	5	Thomas Ceccon	Italy	22.82	Q
14	8	4	Tom Shields	United States	22.88	Q
15	10	1	José Ángel Martínez	Mexico	22.89	Q
16	8	5	Oleg Kostin	Russian Swimming Federation	22.91	Q
17	10	2	Marcin Cieślak	Poland	22.94	Q
17	10	8	Maxime Grousset	France	22.94	
19	9	1	Jakub Majerski	Poland	22.97	
20	8	6	Chad le Clos	South Africa	23.02	
21	8	8	Vinicius Lanza	Brazil	23.18	
22	6	9	Nikola Miljenić	Croatia	23.20	
23	9	7	Jesse Puts	Netherlands	23.24	
24	6	5	Santiago Grassi	Argentina	23.26	NR
25	9	9	Adilbek Mussin	Kazakhstan	23.27	NR
26	8	0	Jan Šefl	Czech Republic	23.29	
26	8	1	Deividas Margevičius	Lithuania	23.29	
26	10	0	Simon Bucher	Austria	23.29	
29	7	5	Fernando Silva	Portugal	23.31	
30	9	2	Nicholas Lia	Norway	23.34	
31	8	7	Emre Sakçı	Turkey	23.38	
31	9	8	Bradley Tandy	South Africa	23.38	
33	8	9	Antani Ivanov	Bulgaria	23.42	
34	7	9	Calum Bain	Ireland	23.46	
34	10	9	Thomas Piron	France	23.46	
36	6	8	Ng Cheuk Yin	Hong Kong	23.51	
37	7	2	Artur Barseghyan	Armenia	23.57	
38	7	1	Waleed Abdulrazzaq	Kuwait	23.65	
39	6	3	Ben Hockin	Paraguay	23.66	
40	5	4	Mehrshad Afghari	Iran	23.67	NR
41	6	7	Anthony Puertas	Peru	23.68	NR
42	6	4	Moon Seung-woo	South Korea	23.75	
43	7	7	Emir Muratović	Bosnia and Herzegovina	23.78	
44	1	4	Eldor Usmonov	Uzbekistan	23.81	
45	6	2	Glenn Victor Sutanto	Indonesia	23.83	
45	7	0	Jorge Otaiza	Venezuela	23.83	
47	7	4	Julien Henx	Luxembourg	23.95	
48	6	0	Tomàs Lomero	Andorra	23.97	NR
49	5	5	Jayhan Odlum-Smith	Saint Lucia	24.09	NR
50	2	4	Jesse Ssengonzi	Uganda	24.15	NR
51	5	7	Ayman Kelzi	Syria	24.64	
52	5	3	Sidrell Williams	Jamaica	24.67	
53	2	7	Liam Henry	Cayman Islands	25.04	
54	5	1	Gabriel Castillo	Bolivia	25.35	
55	4	5	Delron Felix	Grenada	25.67	
55	5	6	Souhail Hamouchane	Morocco	25.67	
57	5	0	Collins Saliboko	Tanzania	25.71	
58	5	2	Yousif Bu Arish	Saudi Arabia	25.78	
59	4	3	Andrew Fowler	Guyana	25.95	
60	5	9	Jefferson Kpanou	Benin	26.10	
61	5	8	Stefan Cvetkoski	North Macedonia	26.12	
62	3	5	Alush Telaku	Kosovo	26.33	
63	4	2	Dalvi Elezi	Albania	26.46	
64	4	8	Yousef Al-Khulaifi	Qatar	26.54	
65	4	6	Batmönkhiin Jürmed	Mongolia	26.59	
66	1	3	Eltonte Leonard	Saint Vincent and the Grenadines	26.90	
67	4	7	Carel Irakoze	Burundi	26.95	
68	4	1	Troy Pina	Cape Verde	27.28	
69	4	4	Ousmane Touré	Mali	27.45	
70	2	5	Fakhriddin Madkamov	Tajikistan	27.57	
71	2	6	Azhar Abbas	Pakistan	27.71	
72	3	2	Cedrick Niyibizi	Rwanda	27.79	
73	3	1	Charly Ndjoume	Cameroon	28.42	
74	3	4	Joshua Wyse	Sierra Leone	29.01	
75	2	3	Abdulmalek Ashur	Libya	29.21	
76	4	9	Achala Gekabel	Ethiopia	29.23	
77	2	1	Yacouba Mouctar	Niger	29.36	
78	3	9	Barkwende Yougbare	Burkina Faso	29.55	
79	3	6	Ebrima Buaro	Gambia	29.59	
80	1	5	Antonio Habis	Palestine	29.77	
80	3	3	Houmed Houssein	Djibouti	29.77	
82	2	8	Ebrahim Al-Maleki	Yemen	30.30	
83	3	7	ElhadjN'Gnane Diallo	Guinea	31.52	
84	3	8	Ibrahim Mohamed	Comoros	31.58	
	2	2	Diosdado Miko Eyanga	Equatorial Guinea	DNS	
	3	0	Sean Walters	Turks and Caicos Islands	DNS	
	4	0	Fahim Anwari	Afghanistan	DNS	
	7	3	Ádám Halás	Slovakia	DNS	
	8	2	Michael Andrew	United States	DNS	
	9	0	Ben Proud	Great Britain	DNS	
	10	3	Teong Tzen Wei	Singapore	DNS	

=== Semifinals ===
The semifinals were started on 19 December at 18:34.

Rank	Heat	Lane	Name	Nationality	Time	Notes
1	2	5	Szebasztián Szabó	Hungary	22.11	Q
2	1	6	Nicholas Santos	Brazil	22.12	Q
3	2	4	Dylan Carter	Trinidad and Tobago	22.18	Q, NR
4	2	3	Matteo Rivolta	Italy	22.20	Q
5	2	1	Tom Shields	United States	22.29	Q
6	2	8	Oleg Kostin	Russian Swimming Federation	22.36	Q
7	1	3	Grigori Pekarski	Belarus	22.44	Q
8	1	4	Nyls Korstanje	Netherlands	22.45	Q
9	2	7	Roman Shevliakov	Russian Swimming Federation	22.59	
10	2	2	Daniel Zaitsev	Estonia	22.61	
11	2	6	Sun Jiajun	China	22.63	NR
12	1	7	Thomas Ceccon	Italy	22.74	
13	1	5	Noè Ponti	Switzerland	22.75	
14	1	1	José Ángel Martínez	Mexico	22.81	
15	1	2	Abdelrahman Sameh	Egypt	22.83	
16	1	8	Marcin Cieślak	Poland	22.86	

=== Final ===
The final was held on 20 December at 18:41.

Rank	Lane	Name	Nationality	Time	Notes
1st place, gold medalist(s)	5	Nicholas Santos	Brazil	21.93	
2nd place, silver medalist(s)	3	Dylan Carter	Trinidad and Tobago	21.98	NR
3rd place, bronze medalist(s)	6	Matteo Rivolta	Italy	22.02	NR
4	4	Szebasztián Szabó	Hungary	22.14	
5	1	Hryhory Pekarski	Belarus	22.35	NR
6	8	Nyls Korstanje	Netherlands	22.39	
7	2	Tom Shields	United States	22.42	
8	7	Oleg Kostin	Russian Swimming Federation	22.43	
