= TYR Pro Swim Series =

Swimming competition series in the United States

TYR Pro Swim Series is an annual swimming competition series held in the United States, attracting top swimmers from around the world.

== History ==
The series was created as part of USA Swimming's domestic calendar and has become one of the most prestigious platforms for preparation for national and international competitions. In 2018, TYR Sport became the title sponsor of the series, after which the competition was officially named the TYR Pro Swim Series.

Traditionally, the TYR Pro Swim Series consists of a set of 3.5-day meets, each attracting 400 to 600 of the world's top swimmers, including members of the USA Swimming National Team, Junior National Team, and 50 of the world's best swimmers.

== Organizer ==
The founder and main organizer of the series is USA Swimming, the national governing body for swimming in the United States. Since 2018, the title sponsor and partner of the series has been TYR Sport, Inc., one of the global leaders in swimming and triathlon gear.

== Key events ==
Olympic champions, world champions, and world record holders regularly participate in the competition.

The series consists of several stages held in different cities across the USA (e.g., Austin, Atlanta, Mesa, Indianapolis, Greensboro, California, Ohio).

The TYR Pro Swim Series serves as one of the main platforms for selection and preparation for the Olympic Games and World Championships.

In 2020, Katie Ledecky set a record for the most victories among women in the series.

== Competition program ==
The TYR Pro Swim Series program includes almost all Olympic pool events (50m) for men and women. An example schedule for a stage (2025, Fort Lauderdale):

- 50m, 100m, 200m, 400m, 800m, 1500m freestyle (men and women)
- 50m, 100m, 200m backstroke, breaststroke, butterfly
- 200m, 400m individual medley

All events are held with preliminaries and finals.

The schedule also provides for "swim-offs" to determine finalists.
