= Andrey Minakov =

Russian swimmer

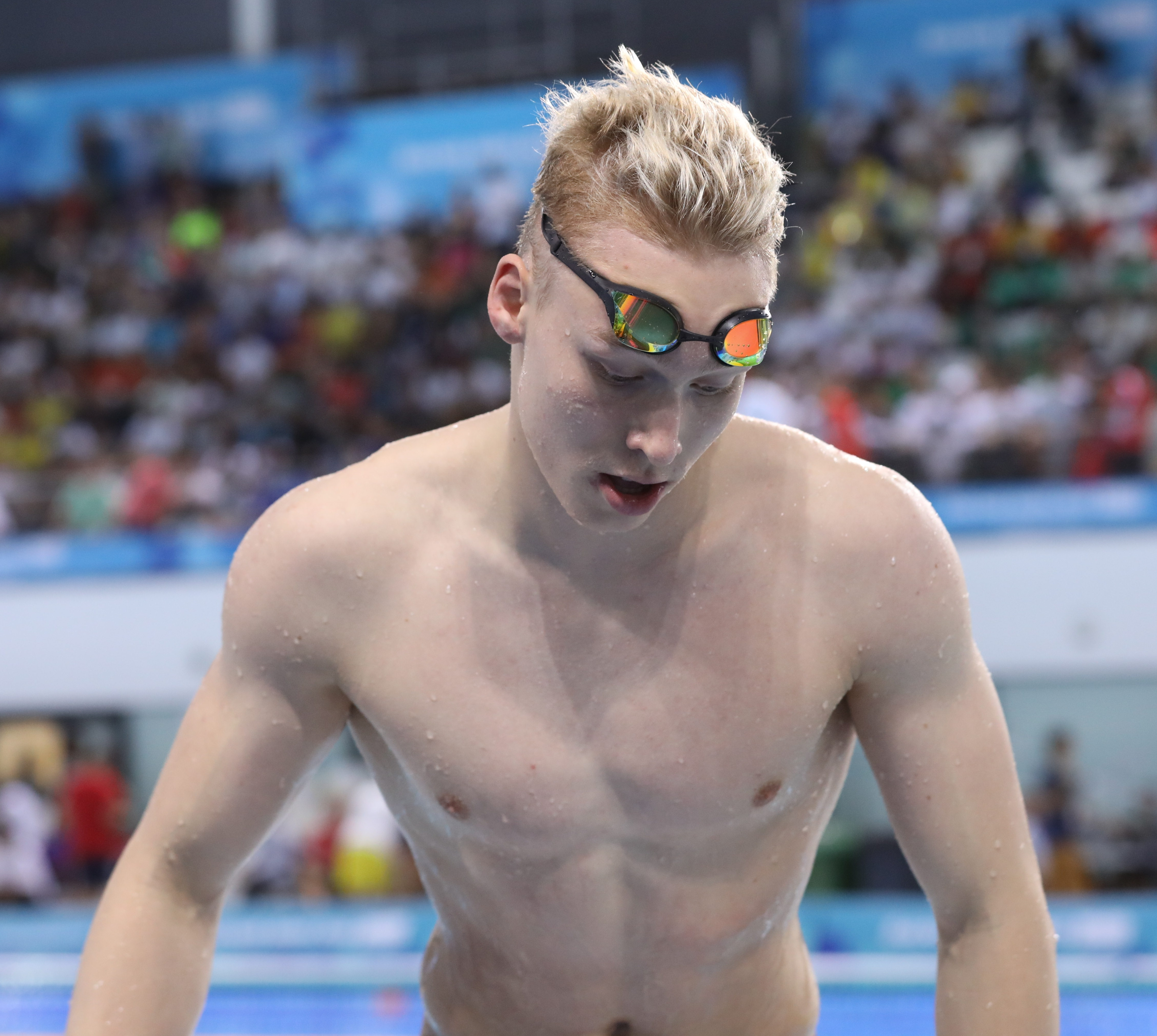
- Minakov in 2018

Personal information
- Full name: Andrey Dmitriyevich Minakov
- National team: Russia
- Born: 17 March 2002 (age 24) Ekenäs, Finland
- Height: 1.87 m (6 ft 2 in)

Sport
- Sport: Swimming
- Strokes: Butterfly, freestyle
- College team: Stanford University
Medal record
Men's swimming
| Event | 1st | 2nd | 3rd |
|---|---|---|---|
| World Championships (LC) | 1 | 2 | 1 |
| World Championships (SC) | 3 | 1 | 3 |
| European Championships (LC) | 1 | 2 | 1 |
| Total | 5 | 5 | 5 |
Men's swimming
Representing Neutral Athletes B
World Championships (LC)
| Gold medal – first place | 2025 Singapore | 4×100 m medley |
World Championships (SC)
| Gold medal – first place | 2024 Budapest | 4×100 m medley |
European Championships (LC)
| Gold medal – first place | 2026 Paris | 4×100 m medley |
| Silver medal – second place | 2026 Paris | 4×100 m freestyle |
Representing Russian Swimming Federation
World Championships (SC)
| Gold medal – first place | 2021 Abu Dhabi | 4×100 m freestyle |
| Gold medal – first place | 2021 Abu Dhabi | 4×50 m medley |
| Silver medal – second place | 2021 Abu Dhabi | 4×50 m freestyle |
| Bronze medal – third place | 2021 Abu Dhabi | 100 m butterfly |
| Bronze medal – third place | 2021 Abu Dhabi | 4×100 m medley |
| Bronze medal – third place | 2021 Abu Dhabi | 4×50 m mixed freestyle |
Representing Russia
World Championships (LC)
| Silver medal – second place | 2019 Gwangju | 100 m butterfly |
| Silver medal – second place | 2019 Gwangju | 4×100 m freestyle |
| Bronze medal – third place | 2019 Gwangju | 4×100 m medley |
European Championships (LC)
| Gold medal – first place | 2020 Budapest | 4×100 m freestyle |
| Silver medal – second place | 2020 Budapest | 4×100 m medley |
| Bronze medal – third place | 2020 Budapest | 100 m freestyle |
World Junior Championships
| Gold medal – first place | 2017 Indianapolis | 4×100 m medley |
| Gold medal – first place | 2019 Budapest | 100 m freestyle |
| Gold medal – first place | 2019 Budapest | 100 m butterfly |
| Gold medal – first place | 2019 Budapest | 4×100 m medley |
| Silver medal – second place | 2017 Indianapolis | 50 m butterfly |
| Silver medal – second place | 2019 Budapest | 50 m butterfly |
| Silver medal – second place | 2019 Budapest | 4×100 m freestyle |
| Silver medal – second place | 2019 Budapest | 4×100 m mixed medley |
| Silver medal – second place | 2019 Budapest | 4×100 m mixed freestyle |
| Bronze medal – third place | 2017 Indianapolis | 100 m butterfly |
| Bronze medal – third place | 2017 Indianapolis | 4×100 m mixed freestyle |
European Junior Championships
| Gold medal – first place | 2018 Helsinki | 50 m butterfly |
| Gold medal – first place | 2018 Helsinki | 4×100 m freestyle |
| Gold medal – first place | 2018 Helsinki | 4×100 m mixed freestyle |
| Gold medal – first place | 2018 Helsinki | 4×100 m medley |
| Gold medal – first place | 2018 Helsinki | 4×100 m mixed medley |
| Gold medal – first place | 2019 Kazan | 100 m butterfly |
| Gold medal – first place | 2019 Kazan | 4×100 m freestyle |
| Gold medal – first place | 2019 Kazan | 4×100 m medley |
| Gold medal – first place | 2019 Kazan | 4×100 m mixed medley |
| Silver medal – second place | 2018 Helsinki | 100 m freestyle |
| Silver medal – second place | 2018 Helsinki | 100 m butterfly |
| Silver medal – second place | 2019 Kazan | 4×100 m mixed freestyle |
| Bronze medal – third place | 2019 Kazan | 50 m butterfly |
Summer Youth Olympics
| Gold medal – first place | 2018 Buenos Aires | 100 m freestyle |
| Gold medal – first place | 2018 Buenos Aires | 50 m butterfly |
| Gold medal – first place | 2018 Buenos Aires | 100 m butterfly |
| Gold medal – first place | 2018 Buenos Aires | 4×100 m freestyle |
| Gold medal – first place | 2018 Buenos Aires | 4×100 m medley |
| Gold medal – first place | 2018 Buenos Aires | 4×100 m mixed freestyle |
| Silver medal – second place | 2018 Buenos Aires | 4×100 m mixed medley |
European Youth Olympic Festival
| Gold medal – first place | 2017 Győr | 100 m freestyle |
| Gold medal – first place | 2017 Győr | 100 m butterfly |
| Gold medal – first place | 2017 Győr | 4x100 m freestyle |
| Gold medal – first place | 2017 Győr | 4x100 m medley |
| Gold medal – first place | 2017 Győr | 4x100 m mixed freestyle |
| Gold medal – first place | 2017 Győr | 4x100 m mixed medley |

Andrey Dmitriyevich Minakov (Russian: Андрей Дмитриевич Минаков; born 17 March 2002) is a Russian swimmer and Olympian. He is the Russian record holder in the long course 100 metre butterfly. He is a former world junior record holder in the long course and short course 50 metre butterfly and long course 100 metre freestyle. At the 2019 World Aquatics Championships, he won silver medals in the 100 metre butterfly and 4×100 metre freestyle relay, and a bronze medal in the 4×100 metre medley relay. In 2021, at the 2020 Summer Olympics, he placed fourth in the 100 metre butterfly, fourth in the 4×100 metre medley relay, seventh in the 4×100 metre freestyle relay, and tenth in the 100 metre freestyle. He also won two gold medals, one silver medal, and three bronze medals at the 2021 World Short Course Championships. In 2022, he won the NCAA title in the 100 yard butterfly.

== Background ==
Minakov was raised in Saint Petersburg, Russia, though later in his youth he began splitting his time between Russia and California, training in the United States during the summer months each year. Collegiately, he started attending Stanford University in 2020, where he started competing as part of the Stanford Cardinal swim team in the fall of 2021, following a year of being redshirted (2020–2021). The week Minakov announced his commitment to swimming for Stanford, the week of 3 December 2019, he ranked number one for "The Week That Was" honour from Swimming World.

In 2023, Minakov changed his region of representation for Russian competitions to the Republic of Tatarstan.

== 2018–2019 ==
=== 2018 Summer Youth Olympics ===
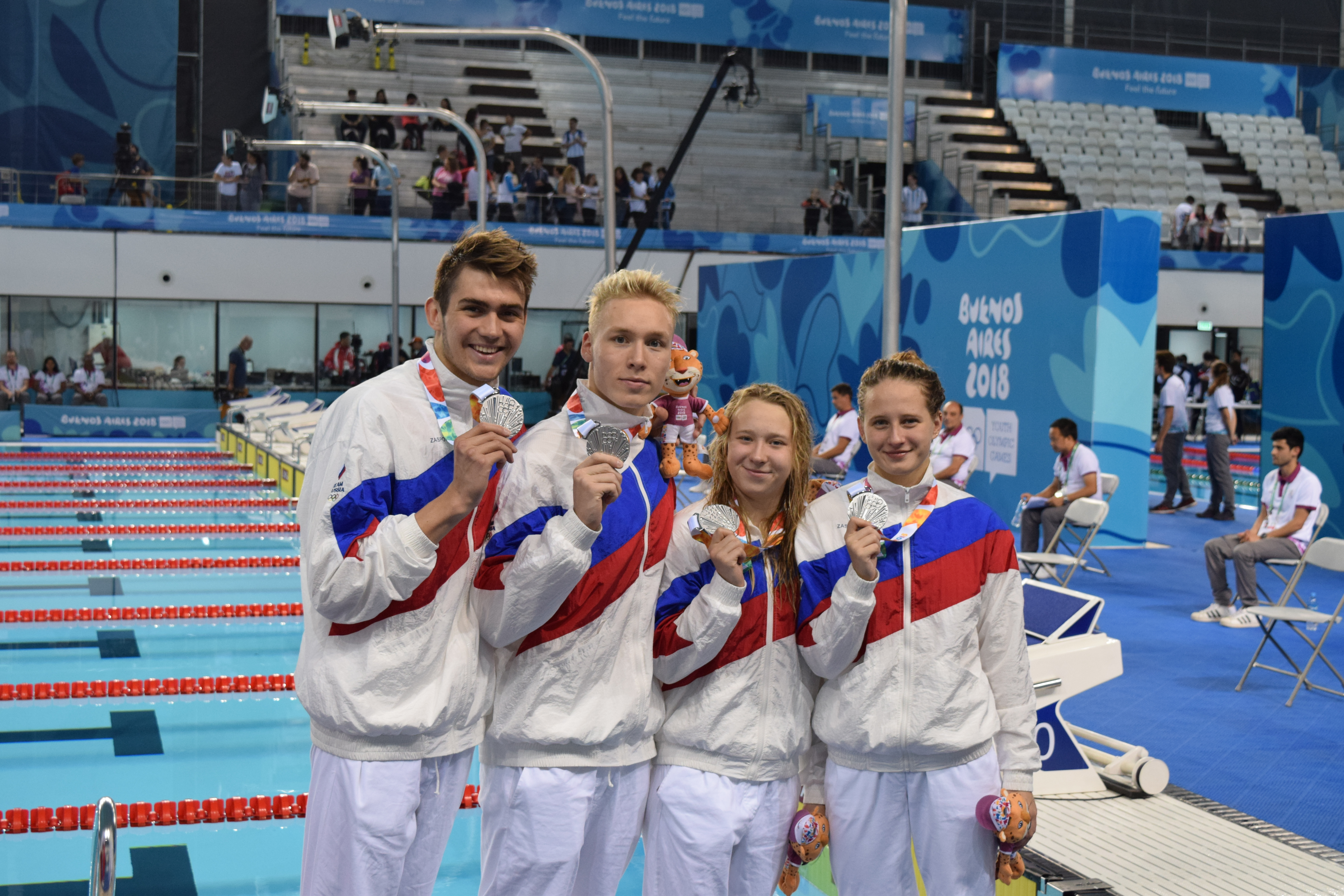
Mixed 4×100 metre medley relay silver medal team

When he was 16 years old, Minakov competed at the 2018 Summer Youth Olympics in Buenos Aires, Argentina, winning six gold medals and one silver medal. Minakov set a new national record of 51.12 seconds in the 100 metre butterfly and won the gold medal, touching ahead of silver medalist in the event Kristóf Milák of Hungary. In addition to the national record, Minakov helped set a new world junior record of 3:35.17 in the final of the 4×100 metre medley relay, swimming the butterfly leg of the relay and splitting a time of 51.14 seconds. He won a gold medal in the 4×100 metre mixed freestyle relay in 3:28.50, splitting a 49.60 for the second leg of the relay in the final. In the 4×100 metre freestyle relay Minakov anchored the relay in 48.93 seconds, contributing to the final time of 3:18.11 with Kliment Kolesnikov, Daniil Markov, and Vladislav Gerasimenko.

For the 50 metre butterfly, Minakov won the gold medal with a time of 23.62 seconds, finishing 0.01 seconds ahead of Daniil Markov and Tomoe Hvas who tied for the silver medal. In the final of the 100 metre freestyle Minakov won the gold medal, finishing less than two tenths of a second ahead of the silver and bronze medalists in the event with a time of 49.23 seconds. He split a 51.63 for the butterfly leg of the 4×100 metre mixed medley relay to help earn the silver medal in a time of 3:51.46 with Polina Egorova (backstroke), Anastasia Makarova (breaststroke), and Kliment Kolesnikov (freestyle).

=== 2019 World Championships ===
2019 World Championships (LC)
| Silver medal – second place | 4×100 m freestyle | 3:09.97 (h) |
| Silver medal – second place | 100 m butterfly | 50.83 (NR) |
| Bronze medal – third place | 4×100 m medley | 3:28.81 (NR) |

In July 2019 at the 2019 World Aquatics Championships in Gwangju, South Korea, Minakov won two silver medals and one bronze medal. In the 100 metre butterfly, Minakov set a new national record for Russia in the semifinals with a time 50.94, advanced to the final ranked second overall, and became the first Russian in history to swim the race in less than 51 seconds. The following day, during the final of the 100 metre butterfly, Minakov won the silver medal in a national record time of 50.83 seconds, touching the wall after first-place finisher Caeleb Dressel of the United States and before third-place finisher Chad le Clos of South Africa. Minakov also won a silver medal in the 4×100 metre freestyle relay, swimming in the prelims heats, and helped win a bronze medal and set a new national record in the 4×100 metre medley relay at 3:28.81 with his relay teammates Evgeny Rylov (backstroke), Kirill Prigoda (breaststroke), and Vladimir Morozov (freestyle), splitting a 50.54 for the butterfly leg of the relay.

=== 2019 World Junior Championships ===
As part of the 4×100 metre medley relay at the 2019 World Junior Championships in Budapest, Hungary in August 2019, Minakov helped win the gold medal and break the world junior record he helped set in the event in 2018, swimming the butterfly leg of the relay in 50.93 seconds and contributing to the new record time of 3:33.19. He also won a gold medal in the 100 metre freestyle with a 48.73, a silver medal in the 50 metre butterfly with a 23.39, a gold medal in the 100 metre butterfly in 51.25 seconds, a silver medal in the 4×100 metre freestyle relay at 3:16.26, a silver medal in the 4×100 metre mixed freestyle relay with a 3:27.72, and contributed to winning the silver medal in the 4×100 metre mixed medley relay with a final time of 3:48.06. For his accomplishments, Minakov was named as one of two "Swimmer of the Championships" competitors along with Lani Pallister of Australia.

== 2020–2022: Redshirt and bans ==
=== 2020 Russian Championships ===
At the 2020 Russian National Championships held in at the Palace of Water Sports in Kazan in October and conducted in long course metres, Minakov swam a personal best time of 47.57 seconds in the 100 metre freestyle and set a new world junior record in the event, breaking the former record of 47.58 seconds set by Kyle Chalmers of Australia when he won the gold medal in the event at the 2016 Summer Olympics. Earlier in the championships, he set a new world junior record in the semifinals of the 50 metre butterfly with a time of 23.05 seconds.

=== 2020–2021 Collegiate season: Redshirt ===
For the 2020 to 2021 collegiate season, starting in the autumn of 2020 and ending in the spring of 2021, Minakov was redshirted by the Stanford Cardinal, and as such, chose to remain living in Russia, take classes online, and train in his home country. In December 2020, at the Russian National Championships conducted in short course metres, Minakov established a new world junior record in the short course 50 metre butterfly with a time of 22.34 seconds. One day earlier, day four of six of the Championships on 17 December, the Court of Arbitration for Sport announced that Russians, including Minakov, were banned from competing at Olympic Games nor World Championships in any sport, including swimming, using the name of their country, their national anthem, nor their flag for two full years (through 16 December 2022).

=== 2020 European Championships ===
In the final of the 4×100 metre freestyle relay at the 2020 European Aquatics Championships, held at Danube Arena in Budapest, Hungary in May 2021, Minakov led-off the relay with a time of 48.18 seconds to help earn the gold medal in the event with a Championships record time of 3:10.41. For the 100 metre freestyle, Minakov won the bronze medal with a time of 47.74 seconds, finishing 0.37 seconds after gold medalist and fellow Russian Kliment Kolesnikov and 0.29 seconds after silver medalist Alessandro Miressi of Italy. Minakov won his third medal of the Championships in the 4×100 metre medley relay where he split a 47.41 for the freestyle leg of the relay in the final to contribute to the final time of 3:29.50 and help win the silver medal.

=== 2020 Summer Olympics ===
For those Russians who wanted compete at the 2020 Olympic Games, the International Olympic Committee forced them, including Minakov, to compete using the name Russian Olympic Committee, no flag, uniforms of their design, and a song of their choice/approval instead of the national anthem, with the decision stemming from the two year Court of Arbitration for Sport ban lasting December 2020 to December 2022. At the 2020 Summer Olympics itself, which took place in Tokyo, Japan in 2021 due to the COVID-19 pandemic, Minakov placed 4th in the 100 metre butterfly with a time of 50.88 seconds. He also placed 4th swimming the butterfly leg of the 4×100 metre medley relay splitting a time of 50.31, 10th in the 100 metre freestyle where he swam a time of 48.03 seconds in the semifinals, and 7th in the 4×100 metre freestyle relay splitting a 47.71 for the lead-off leg of the relay.

=== 2021–2022 Collegiate season beginnings ===
Competing in his first collegiate season for Stanford University, Minakov improved his best time in the 50 yard freestyle by approximately six-tenths of a second on the first day of competition, 18 November, with a time of 19.13 seconds in the prelims at the 2021 North Carolina State Fall Invitational in Greensboro, North Carolina, United States. In the final of the 50 yard freestyle, Minakov tied for second-place with his time of 19.20 seconds. The second day of competition, Minakov set a new personal best time in the 100 yard butterfly at 44.78 seconds, which won him first place. The morning of the third day of competition, Minakov swam a personal best time of 42.49 seconds in the 100 yard freestyle in the prelims heats. In the evening, Minoakov won the event, lowering his time in the race to 41.89 seconds.

=== 2021 World Short Course Championships ===
2021 World Championships (SC)
| Gold medal – first place | 4×100 m freestyle | 3:03.45 |
| Gold medal – first place | 4×50 m medley | 1:30.51 (CR) |
| Silver medal – second place | 4×50 m freestyle | 1:23.75 |
| Bronze medal – third place | 4×50 m mixed freestyle | 1:28.97 |
| Bronze medal – third place | 100 m butterfly | 49.21 |
| Bronze medal – third place | 4×100 m medley | 3:20.65 |

Minakov was announced to the team Russia roster on 2 December for the 2021 World Short Course Championships in Abu Dhabi, United Arab Emirates. Due to the ongoing ban on Russian representation at World Championships by the Court of Arbitration for Sport, the event organizer, FINA forced him and all other Russians at the Championships to compete using the name Russian Swimming Federation.

On 16 December, the first day of competition, Minakov split a 45.94 for the 4×100 metre freestyle relay, helping achieve a time of 3:06.02 with prelims relay teammates Aleksandr Shchegolev, Vladimir Morozov, and Daniil Markov, and advance the relay to the final ranked first overall. In the final of the event, Minakov contributed to the finals relay first-place finish in 3:03.45 with relay teammates Aleksandr Shchegolev, Kliment Kolesnikov, and Vladislav Grinev, and won a gold medal for his efforts in both the prelims and final. The following day, Minakov ranked second in the prelims heats of the 100 metre butterfly, ahead of Youssef Ramadan of Egypt and behind Noè Ponti of Switzerland with his time of 49.60 seconds, and qualified for the semifinals later the same day. He split a 21.04 for the lead-off leg of the 4×50 metre mixed freestyle relay, helping his prelims relay teammates qualify the relay for the final ranked first at 1:29.84. In the evening, Minakov qualified for the final of the 100 metre butterfly ranking eighth with a 49.79. Later in the same session, Minakov split a 20.95 for the second leg of 4×50 metre mixed freestyle relay, helping win the bronze medal in 1:28.97.

On the third day of competition, Minakov swam a 49.21 in the 100 metre butterfly final to win the bronze medal. Minakov substituted in for Daniil Markov on the finals relay in the 4×50 metre freestyle relay on day four, splitting a 21.14 for the lead-off leg to contribute to the final time of 1:23.75 and winning the silver medal. In the final of the 4×50 metre medley relay on day five, Minakov split a 21.76 for the butterfly leg of the relay to help win the gold medal in a Championships record time of 1:30.51. On the final day, day six of competition, Minakov split a 48.81 for the butterfly leg of the 4×100 metre medley relay, helping win the bronze medal in a time of 3:20.65.

=== 2022 Pac-12 Conference Championships ===
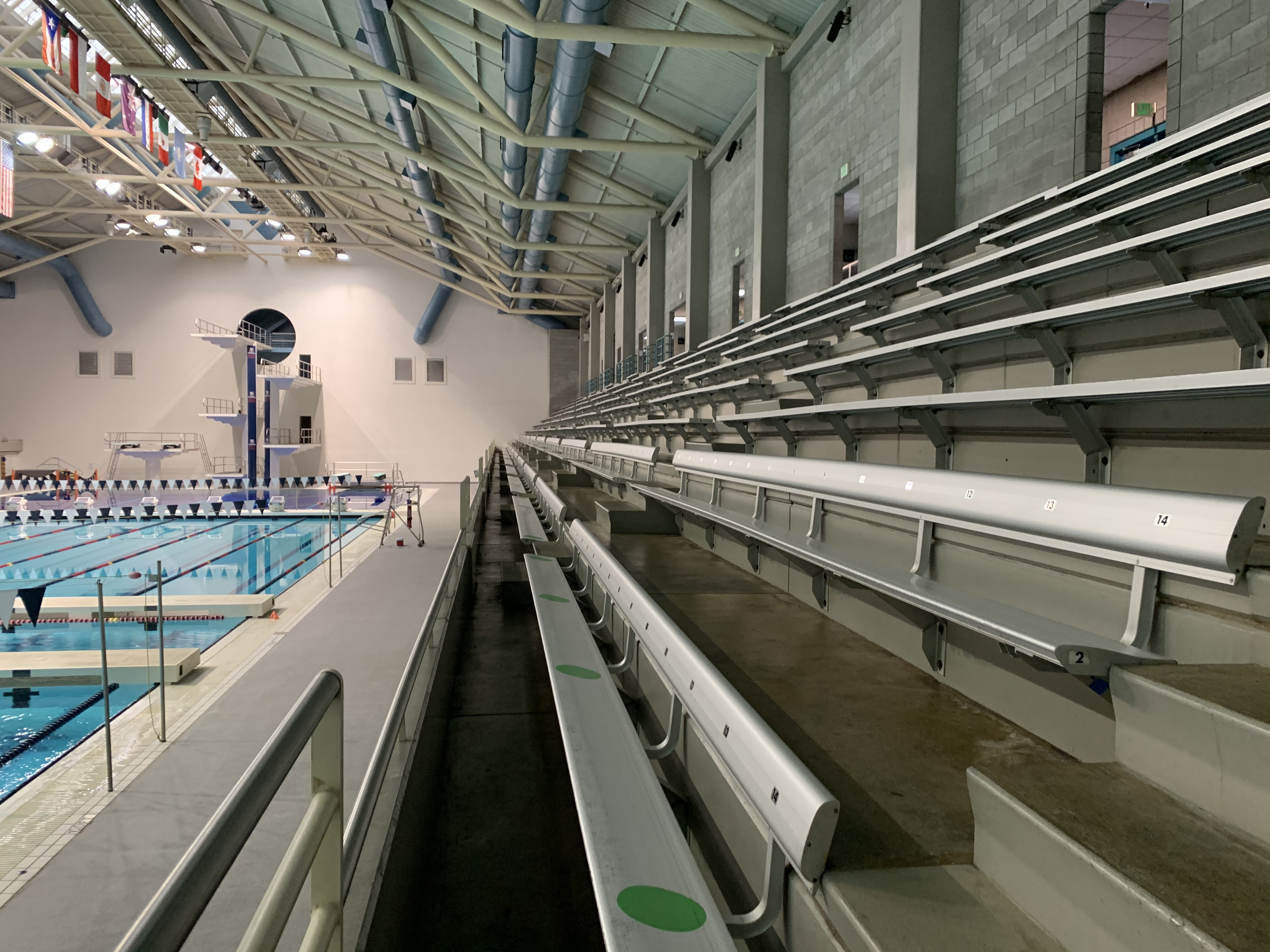
KCAC, where Minakov learned he was banned from LEN events.

Heading into his first collegiate championships season, Minakov won the 100 yard butterfly, with a time of 46.40 seconds, and the 50 yard freestyle, with a 19.58, in dual meet in February 2022. At the 2022 Pac-12 Conference Championships in early March 2022, and held at the King County Aquatic Center (KCAC) in Federal Way, United States, Minakov split a 19.49 for the butterfly leg of the 4×50 yard medley relay on the first day to help achieve a first-place finish in 1:22.74 and become the second-fastest swimmer in terms of 50 yard butterfly split times on relays in the NCAA, only after Joseph Schooling. On day two, he swam a 19.24 in the prelims heats of the 50 yard freestyle to qualify for the final ranking second. In the evening, he swam a personal best time of 19.08 seconds in the final to place second. Minakov followed up his 19.08 with a 19.10 lead-off leg in the next event, the 4×50 yard freestyle relay, helping achieve a fourth-place finish in 1:16.74. Day three of competition, he swam a time of 44.21 seconds in the prelims heats of the 100 yard butterfly to qualify for the final ranking first and set a new Championships record. In the final, he set a new Pac-12 Conference record of 43.90 seconds to win the event, and later in the finals session he helped achieve a win in the 4×100 yard medley relay, splitting a 44.16 for the butterfly leg of the relay. The fourth and final day, he ranked ninth in the prelims heats of the 100 yard freestyle with a 42.68 to qualify for the b-final. In the evening finals session, he placed first in the b-final of the 100 yard freestyle with a 42.27 before helping achieve a third-place finish in the 4×100 yard freestyle relay where he swam a 41.47 for the first 100-yard portion of the relay to contribute to the final time of 2:47.17.

=== First ban for being Russian (LEN) ===
On 3 March 2022, Minakov was indefinitely banned from international competition at LEN events along with all other Russians and Belarusians in response to the 2022 Russian invasion of Ukraine, the ban was enacted on the second day of the aforementioned 2022 Pac-12 Conference Championships.

=== 2022 NCAA Championships ===
2022 NCAA Championships
| Gold medal – first place | 100 yd butterfly | 43.71 |
| Bronze medal – third place | 4×200 yd freestyle | 6:06.83 |
| Bronze medal – third place | 100 yd freestyle | 41.09 |

Minakov competed in two events on the first day of the 2022 NCAA Division I Championships, 23 March, starting by helping achieve an eighth-place finish in the 4×50 yard medley relay in 1:22.41 by splitting a 19.42 for the butterfly leg of the relay, then contributing a split of 1:31.49 for the lead-off leg of the 4×200 yard freestyle relay to help place third in 6:06.83. The next day, he helped place fourteenth in the 4×50 yard freestyle relay with a 1:16.36, splitting a 19.20 for the lead-off leg of the relay. For the prelims heats of the 100 yard butterfly on the third morning, he qualified for the final of the event ranking first with a personal best time of 43.77 seconds and broke the pool record of 44.01 seconds set by Joseph Schooling in 2016. He won the 100 yard butterfly title in the final, breaking his own pool record with a personal best time of 43.71 seconds and finishing less than two-tenths of a second ahead of second-place finisher Luca Urlando and third-place finisher Youssef Ramadan. Following up his 43.71, he split a 43.58 for the butterfly leg of the 4×100 yard medley relay to help place sixth in 3:01.70. In the morning prelims heats of the 100 yard freestyle on the fourth and final day, he qualified for the final ranking fourth with a personal best time of 41.29 seconds. He swam another personal best time in the final of the 100 yard freestyle, finishing third in 41.09 seconds, which was less than three-tenths of a second behind first-place finisher Brooks Curry and less than three-tenths of a second ahead of sixth-place finisher Drew Kibler. For the 4×100 yard freestyle relay, he led-off with a 41.61, helping achieve an eighth-place finish in 2:48.21.

=== Second ban for being Russian (FINA) ===
Twenty-six days after the end of the Championships, Minakov and all other Russians and Belarusians were banned from all FINA competitions for the remainder of the year, including and not limited to the 2022 World Aquatics Championships and the 2022 World Short Course Championships. Times he and other Russians achieved at non-FINA events from that point out through the end of 2022 did not count towards world records nor world rankings.

=== 2022 US National Championships ===
For the 2022 USA Swimming National Championships, held in July in Irvine, California, Minakov was allowed to compete, he was required to compete for a United States club instead of his country, and placed fourth in the 100 metre butterfly with a time of 52.24 seconds, which was less than two seconds behind gold medalist Shaine Casas, and placed fourth in the b-final of the 100 metre freestyle with a time of 49.26 seconds.

=== 2022 Russian Solidarity Games ===
At the November segment of the 2022 Russian Solidarity Games, conducted in short course metres in Kazan for swimming competition, Minakov won the gold medal in the 100 metre butterfly with a time of 49.92 seconds on day four, 22 November. The following day, he finished in a time of 21.31 seconds in the 50 metre freestyle to win the bronze medal, sharing the podium with Kliment Kolesnikov (gold medalist) and Daniil Markov (silver medalist). On day six, he swam a personal best time of 22.30 seconds in the final of the 50 metre butterfly and won the gold medal. The seventh and final day, he achieved a silver medal-win in the 100 metre freestyle with a personal best time of 46.56 seconds in the final.

== 2023 ==
=== 2023 Pac-12 Conference Championships ===
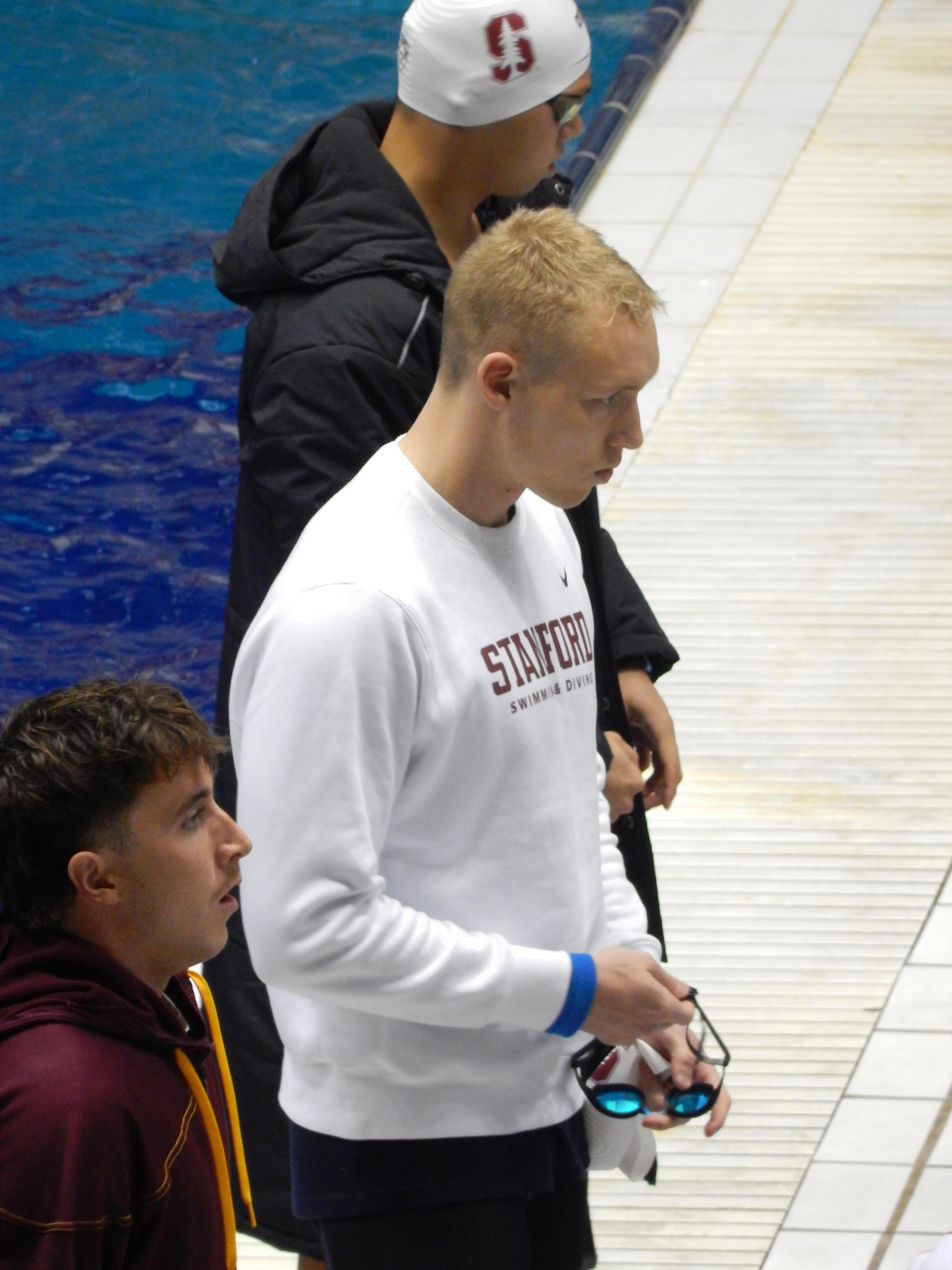
Minakov in the preliminaries of the 100 yard butterfly (2023 Pac-12's)

The first evening of the 2023 Pac-12 Conference Championships, held in early March at King County Aquatic Center in Federal Way, United States, Minakov split a 19.49 for the butterfly leg of the 4×50 yard medley relay, though was disqualified with the rest of his relay teammates, Leon MacAlister, Zhier Fan, and Rafael Gu, along with three other relay teams. On the evening of day two, he won the bronze medal in the 50 yard freestyle with a personal best time of 19.07 seconds. Later in the session, he swam the first leg of the 4×50 yard freestyle relay in 19.13 seconds, contributing to a time of 1:16.24 and fourth-place finish. For the 100 yard butterfly on day three, he ranked first in the morning preliminaries with a 44.34, then won the conference title in the final with a time of 44.51 seconds that registered him as the only swimmer faster than 45 seconds. He followed his gold medal up with a bronze medal in the 4×100 yard medley relay later in the same session, swimming a 44.16 for the butterfly leg of the relay to help finish in 3:02.71.

On the fourth and final day, Minakov started the evening finals session with a sixth-place finish in the 100 yard freestyle, finishing in a time of 42.01 seconds that was 1.11 seconds behind gold medalist Björn Seeliger of the California Golden Bears. He concluded with a relay team disqualification in the 4×100 yard freestyle relay, on which he swam a 41.77 for the second leg of the relay. His performances throughout the Championships contributed to an overall third-place team finish for the Stanford Cardinal.

=== 2023 NCAA Championships ===
The first finals session of the 2023 NCAA Division I Championships, held starting 22 March, Minakov helped place tenth in the 4×50 yard medley relay, contributing a split time of 19.67 seconds for the butterfly leg to a final time of 1:22.69, and seventh in the 4×200 yard freestyle relay in 6:12.66, where he led-off with a 1:32.54. Swimming a 19.16 for the first leg of the 4×50 yard freestyle relay on day two, he helped achieve a fourteenth-place finish in 1:16.44. On day three, he qualified for the final of the 100 yard butterfly with a season best and All-American time of 44.17 seconds before placing fourth in the final in a time of 44.27 seconds. In his second event of the day, he placed eleventh with his relay teammates in the 4×100 yard medley relay, contributing a split time of 44.45 seconds for the butterfly portion to a final time of 3:03.61. The morning of the fourth and final day, he placed thirty-fourth in the 100 yard freestyle with a time of 42.53 seconds. In the evening finals session, he helped place eighth in a time of 2:47.61 in the 4×100 yard freestyle relay, swimming the second leg of the relay in 41.11 seconds. The points allocated for the relay finishes and his 100 yard butterfly fourth-place finish contributed to an overall eighth-place for the Stanford Cardinal team at the Championships.

=== 2023 Russian Championships ===
2023 Russian Championships (LC)
| Silver medal – second place | 100 m butterfly | 51.23 |
| Silver medal – second place | 100 m freestyle | 48.32 |
| Bronze medal – third place | 4×100 m mixed medley | 3:49.16 |

Following the termination of the collegiate Championships, Minakov returned to Russia for training, changed his region of representation for Russian competitions to the Republic of Tatarstan, and prepared for the 2023 Russian National Championships, held starting 16 April in Kazan, and the first Yuzhno-Sakhalinsk-hosted Russian Swimming Cup, held 1 to 2 May 2023. After he returned to Russia, World Aquatics (formerly FINA) announced its extension of the ban on Russians and Belarusians at their competitions from 2022 for the foreseeable future. On the first day of the Russian National Championships, he helped the Republic of Tatarstan relay place fifth in the 4×100m freestyle relay in 3:21.40, leading-off the relay with a 48.22.

The second morning, MInakov ranked second in the preliminaries of the 100 metre butterfly with a time of 51.58 seconds and advanced to the semifinals. For the evening semifinals he finished in a time of 51.91 seconds and qualified for the final on day three ranking fourth. He followed up with a 50.98 for the butterfly leg of the Republic of Tatarstan relay team in the 4×100 metre mixed medley relay final, helping win the bronze medal in 3:49.16. The third evening session, he won a silver medal in the 100 metre butterfly with a time of 51.23 seconds. On the fourth morning, he ranked fourth out of 153 competitors in the preliminary heats of the 50 metre butterfly with a 23.58 and advanced to the semifinals stage of competition. In the evening session, he tied for fifth-rank and qualified for the final of the 50 metre butterfly in the semifinals, with a time of 23.43 seconds, and led-off the 4×200 metre freestyle relay with a personal best time of 1:47.57 to contribute to a fourth-place finish in 7:23.36.

On the fifth day, Minakov finished in a time of 49.37 seconds in the preliminaries of the 100 metre freestyle, qualifying for the semifinals ranking seventh. In the evening, he started with a fifth-place finish in the 50 metre butterfly final with time a of 23.45 seconds. He concluded the session with a ranking of fourth in the semifinals of the 100 metre freestyle, qualifying for the final with a time of 48.73 seconds. Concluding his competition at the Championships in the final of the 100 metre freestyle on the sixth and final day, he won the silver medal with a time of 48.32 seconds.

== International championships (50 m) ==
| Meet | 100 free | 50 fly | 100 fly | 4×100 free | 4×100 medley | 4×100 mixed free | 4×100 mixed medley |
|---|---|---|---|---|---|---|---|
Junior level
| EYOF 2017 | 1st place, gold medalist(s) | —N/a | 1st place, gold medalist(s) | 1st place, gold medalist(s) | 1st place, gold medalist(s) | 1st place, gold medalist(s) | 1st place, gold medalist(s) |
| WJC 2017 | 45th | 2nd place, silver medalist(s) | 3rd place, bronze medalist(s) | 5th | (gold) ^{[a]} | 3rd place, bronze medalist(s) | |
| EJC 2018 | 2nd place, silver medalist(s) | 1st place, gold medalist(s) | 2nd place, silver medalist(s) | 1st place, gold medalist(s) | 1st place, gold medalist(s) | 1st place, gold medalist(s) | 1st place, gold medalist(s) |
| YOG 2018 | 1st place, gold medalist(s) | 1st place, gold medalist(s) | 1st place, gold medalist(s) | 1st place, gold medalist(s) | 1st place, gold medalist(s) | 1st place, gold medalist(s) | 2nd place, silver medalist(s) |
| EJC 2019 | | 3rd place, bronze medalist(s) | 1st place, gold medalist(s) | 1st place, gold medalist(s) | 1st place, gold medalist(s) | 2nd place, silver medalist(s) | 1st place, gold medalist(s) |
| WJC 2019 | 1st place, gold medalist(s) | 2nd place, silver medalist(s) | 1st place, gold medalist(s) | 2nd place, silver medalist(s) | 1st place, gold medalist(s) | 2nd place, silver medalist(s) | 2nd place, silver medalist(s) |
Senior level
| WC 2019 | | | 2nd place, silver medalist(s) | (silver) ^{[a]} | 3rd place, bronze medalist(s) | | 4th^{[a]} |
| EC 2020 | 3rd place, bronze medalist(s) | 6th | 13th | 1st place, gold medalist(s) | 2nd place, silver medalist(s) | | 4th |
| OG 2020 | 10th | —N/a | 4th | 7th | 4th | —N/a | |

^{a} Minakov swam only in the heats.

== International championships (25 m) ==
| Meet | 100 fly | 4×50 free | 4×100 free | 4×50 medley | 4×100 medley | 4×50 mixed free |
|---|---|---|---|---|---|---|
| WC 2021 | 3rd place, bronze medalist(s) | 2nd place, silver medalist(s) | 1st place, gold medalist(s) | 1st place, gold medalist(s) | 3rd place, bronze medalist(s) | 3rd place, bronze medalist(s) |

== Collegiate championships (25 yd) ==
| Meet | 50 free | 100 free | 100 fly | 4×50 free | 4×100 free | 4×200 free | 4×50 medley | 4×100 medley |
|---|---|---|---|---|---|---|---|---|
| Pac-12's 2022 | 2nd place, silver medalist(s) | 1st (b) | 1st place, gold medalist(s) | 4th | 3rd place, bronze medalist(s) | | 1st place, gold medalist(s) | 1st place, gold medalist(s) |
| NCAA DI 2022 | | 3rd place, bronze medalist(s) | 1st place, gold medalist(s) | 14th | 8th | 3rd place, bronze medalist(s) | 8th | 6th |
| Pac-12's 2023 | 3rd place, bronze medalist(s) | 6th | 1st place, gold medalist(s) | 4th | DSQ | | DSQ | 3rd place, bronze medalist(s) |
| NCAA DI 2023 | | 34th | 4th | 14th | 8th | 7th | 10th | 11th |

== Personal best times ==
=== Long course metres (50 m pool) ===
| Event | Time | | Meet | Date | Age | Location | Notes | Ref |
|---|---|---|---|---|---|---|---|---|
| 50 m freestyle | 22.71 | | 2020 Summer Olympics | 28 July 2021 | 19 | Tokyo, Japan | † | |
| 100 m freestyle | 47.57 | | 2020 Russian National Championships | 30 October 2020 | 18 | Kazan | former WJ | |
| 200 m freestyle | 1:47.57 | r | 2023 Russian National Championships | 19 April 2023 | 21 | Kazan | | |
| 50 m butterfly | 23.02 | | 2021 Russian National Championships | 4 April 2021 | 19 | Kazan | | |
| 100 m butterfly | 50.83 | | 2019 World Aquatics Championships | 27 July 2019 | 17 | Gwangju, South Korea | NR | |

Legend: NR – Russian record; e – equalled existing record; WJ – World Junior record;
Records not set in finals: h – heat; sf – semifinal; r – relay 1st leg; rh – relay heat 1st leg; b – B final; † – en route to final mark; so – swim-off; tt – time trial

=== Short course metres (25 m pool) ===
| Event | Time | | Meet | Date | Age | Location | Ref |
|---|---|---|---|---|---|---|---|
| 50 m freestyle | 21.14 | h, r | 2021 World Short Course Championships | 19 December 2021 | 19 | Abu Dhabi, United Arab Emirates | |
| 100 m freestyle | 46.56 | | 2022 Russian Solidarity Games | 25 November 2022 | 20 | Kazan | |
| 50 m butterfly | 22.30 | | 2022 Russian Solidarity Games | 24 November 2022 | 20 | Kazan | |
| 100 m butterfly | 49.21 | | 2021 World Short Course Championships | 18 December 2021 | 19 | Abu Dhabi, United Arab Emirates | |

Legend: h – preliminary heat; r – relay 1st leg

=== Short course yards (25 yd pool) ===
| Event | Time | | Meet | Date | Age | Location | Ref |
|---|---|---|---|---|---|---|---|
| 50 yd freestyle | 19.07 | | 2023 Pac-12 Conference Championships | 2 March 2023 | 20 | Federal Way, United States | |
| 100 yd freestyle | 41.09 | | 2022 NCAA Division I Championships | 26 March 2022 | 20 | Atlanta, United States | |
| 200 yd freestyle | 1:31.49 | r | 2022 NCAA Division I Championships | 23 March 2022 | 20 | Atlanta, United States | |
| 100 yd butterfly | 43.71 | | 2022 NCAA Division I Championships | 25 March 2022 | 20 | Atlanta, United States | |

Legend: r — relay 1st leg

== Records ==
=== World junior records ===
==== Long course metres (50 m pool) ====
| No. | Event | Time | | Meet | Location | Date | Status | Age | Ref |
|---|---|---|---|---|---|---|---|---|---|
| 1 | 4×100 m medley relay | 3:35.17 | | 2018 Summer Youth Olympics | Buenos Aires, Argentina | 10 October 2018 | Former | 16 | |
| 2 | 4×100 m medley relay (2) | 3:33.19 | | 2019 World Junior Championships | Budapest, Hungary | 25 August 2019 | Current | 17 | |
| 3 | 50 m butterfly | 23.05 | sf | Russian National Championships | Kazan | 28 October 2020 | Former | 18 | |
| 4 | 100 m freestyle | 47.57 | | Russian National Championships | Kazan | 30 October 2020 | Former | 18 | |

Legend: sf – semifinals

==== Short course metres (25 m pool) ====
| No. | Event | Time | Meet | Location | Date | Status | Age | Ref |
|---|---|---|---|---|---|---|---|---|
| 1 | 50 m butterfly | 22.34 | Russian National Championships | Saint Petersburg | 18 December 2020 | Former | 18 | |

=== National records ===
==== Long course metres (50 m pool) ====
| No. | Event | Time | | Meet | Location | Date | Status | Age | Ref |
|---|---|---|---|---|---|---|---|---|---|
| 1 | 100 m butterfly | 51.12 | | 2018 Summer Youth Olympics | Buenos Aires, Argentina | 9 October 2018 | Former | 16 | |
| 2 | 100 m butterfly (2) | 50.94 | sf | 2019 World Aquatics Championships | Gwangju, South Korea | 26 July 2019 | Former | 17 | |
| 3 | 100 m butterfly (3) | 50.83 | | 2019 World Aquatics Championships | Gwangju, South Korea | 27 July 2019 | Current | 17 | |
| 4 | 4×100 m medley relay | 3:28.81 | | 2019 World Aquatics Championships | Gwangju, South Korea | 28 July 2019 | Current | 17 | |

Legend: sf – semifinals

== Awards and honours ==
- SwimSwam Top 100 (Men's): 2021 (#14), 2022 (#32)
- Swimming World, The Week That Was: 3 December 2019 (#1)
- Pac-12 Conference, Swimmer of the Week (male): 10 February 2022
- FINA, Male Swimmer of the Championships: 2019 World Junior Championships
- SwimSwam Swammy Award, Junior Swimmer of the Year (male): 2019, 2020
- SwimSwam Swammy Award, Breakout Swimmer of the Year (male): 2019

== See also ==
- List of World Aquatics Championships medalists in swimming (men)
- List of World Swimming Championships (25 m) medalists (men)
