= Nicholas Santos =

Brazilian swimmer (born 1980)

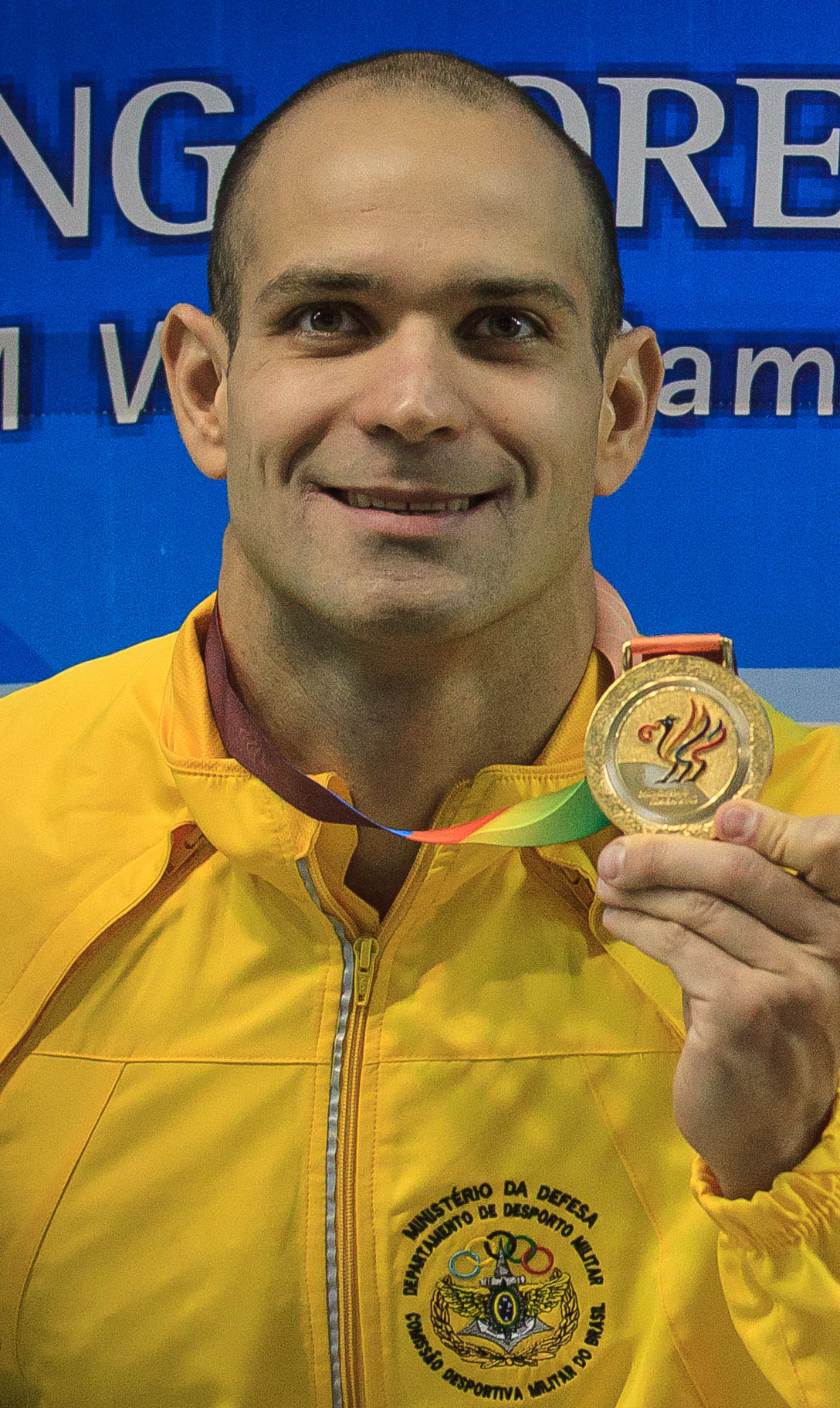
- Nicholas Santos, 2015

Personal information
- Full name: Nicholas Araújo Dias dos Santos
- National team: Brazil
- Born: 14 February 1980 (age 46) Ribeirão Preto, São Paulo, Brazil
- Height: 1.91 m (6 ft 3 in)
- Weight: 89 kg (196 lb)

Sport
- Sport: Swimming
- Strokes: Freestyle, Butterfly
- Club: Unisanta
Medal record
Men's swimming
Representing Brazil
World Championships (LC)
Silver medal – second place	2015 Kazan	50 m butterfly
Silver medal – second place	2017 Budapest	50 m butterfly
Silver medal – second place	2022 Budapest	50 m butterfly
Bronze medal – third place	2019 Gwangju	50 m butterfly
World Championships (SC)
Gold medal – first place	2012 Istanbul	50 m butterfly
Gold medal – first place	2014 Doha	4×50 m medley
Gold medal – first place	2014 Doha	4×50 m mixed medley
Gold medal – first place	2018 Hangzhou	50 m butterfly
Gold medal – first place	2021 Abu Dhabi	50 m butterfly
Gold medal – first place	2022 Melbourne	50 m butterfly
Silver medal – second place	2004 Indianapolis	4×100 m freestyle
Silver medal – second place	2014 Doha	50 m butterfly
Silver medal – second place	2016 Windsor	4×50 m mixed medley
Bronze medal – third place	2004 Indianapolis	50 m freestyle
Bronze medal – third place	2010 Dubai	4×100 m freestyle
Bronze medal – third place	2018 Hangzhou	4×50 m medley
Pan Pacific Championships
Silver medal – second place	2010 Irvine	50 m butterfly
Pan American Games
Gold medal – first place	2007 Rio de Janeiro	4×100 m freestyle
Gold medal – first place	2011 Guadalajara	4×100 m freestyle
Silver medal – second place	2007 Rio de Janeiro	50 m freestyle
Universiade
Gold medal – first place	2007 Bangkok	50 m freestyle
Silver medal – second place	2007 Bangkok	50 m butterfly
Bronze medal – third place	2005 İzmir	50 m freestyle
Bronze medal – third place	2005 İzmir	50 m butterfly
South American Games
Gold medal – first place	2014 Santiago	4×100 m medley

Nicholas Araújo Dias dos Santos (born 14 February 1980) is a Brazilian competitive swimmer who specializes in freestyle and butterfly sprint events. He swam the 50-metre freestyle at the 2008 Summer Olympics and was a member of the Brazilian 4×100-meter freestyle team at the 2012 Summer Olympics. At the 50-metre butterfly, he was the World Record holder in Short Course, and he was the Americas Record Holder in Long Course.

== International career ==
=== 2001–2004 ===
His first participation in the World Championships was in the 2001 World Aquatics Championships in Fukuoka, where he finished 30th in the 50-metre freestyle.

On 17 November, he broke the short-course South American record of the 50-metre butterfly, with a time of 23.82 seconds.

At the 2002 FINA World Swimming Championships (25 m) in Moscow, Nicholas finished 23rd in the 50-metre freestyle and 13th in the 50-metre butterfly.

He swam at the 2002 Pan Pacific Swimming Championships, where he finished 9th in the 50-metre freestyle.

Participating in the 2003 World Aquatics Championships in Barcelona, Nicholas finished 40th in the 50-metre butterfly.

On 10 September 2004, Santos broke the short-course South American record of the 50-metre freestyle with a time of 21.32 seconds, coming close to beat the World Record that belonged to Frédérick Bousquet with 21.10 seconds.

At the 2004 FINA World Swimming Championships (25 m) in Indianapolis, Nicholas Santos won the silver medal in the 4 × 100-metre freestyle and bronze in the 50-metre freestyle. He also participated in the 50-metre butterfly, where he was disqualified, and the 100-metre freestyle, where he was in the finals, placing 8th.

=== 2005–2008 ===
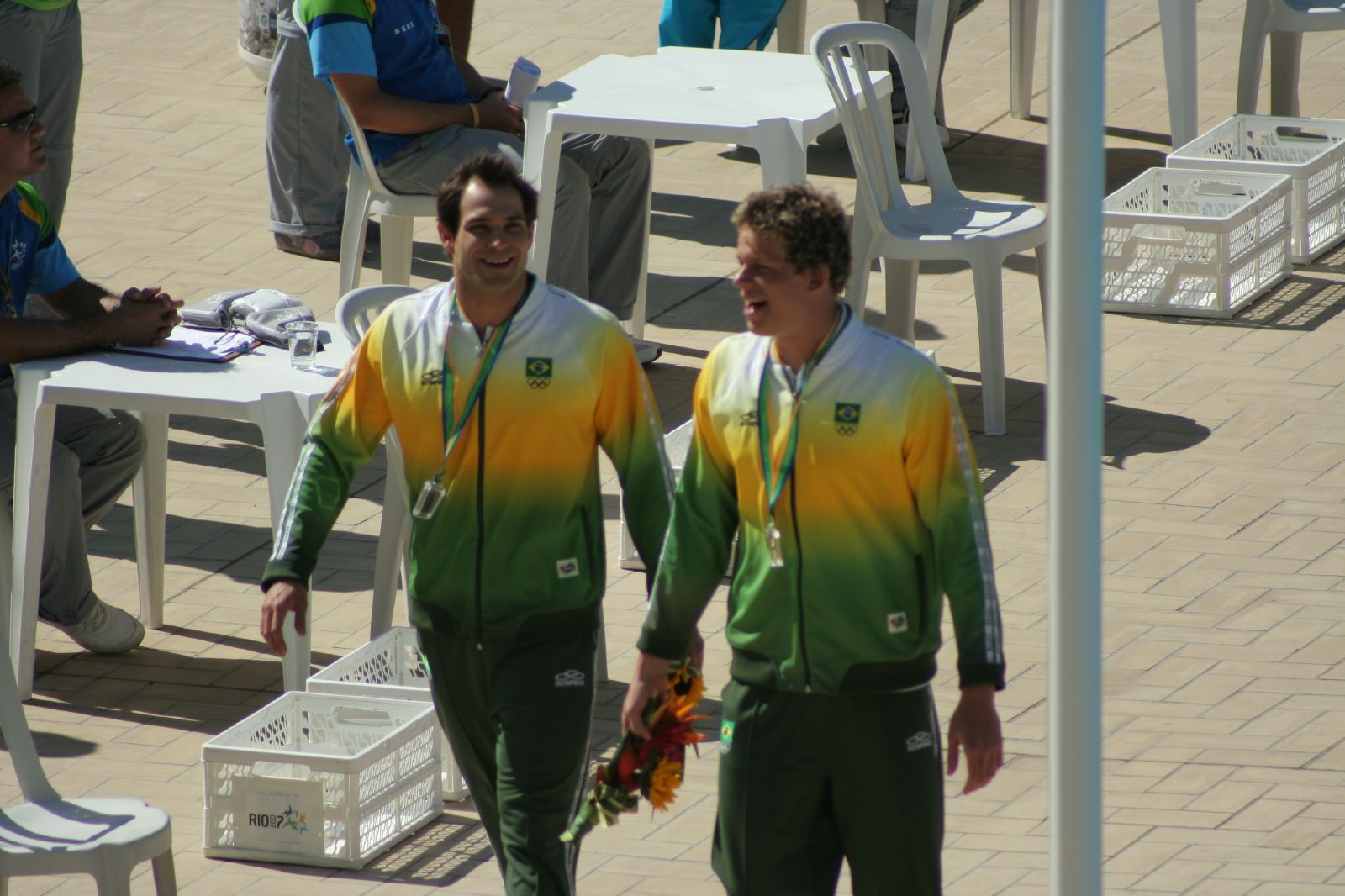
Santos and César Cielo at 2007 Pan American Games

At the 2005 Summer Universiade, Nicholas won a bronze medal in the 50-metre freestyle and in the 50-metre butterfly.

Santos swam at the 2006 Pan Pacific Swimming Championships, where he finished 10th in the 50-metre freestyle.

At the 2007 Pan American Games in Rio de Janeiro, he became champion in 4 × 100-metre freestyle, with a new Pan-American record made by the Brazilian team: 3:15.90, and was also a silver medalist in the 50-metre freestyle, with a time of 22.18 seconds.

Nicholas competed in the 2007 Summer Universiade, where he won a gold medal in the 50-metre freestyle and a silver medal in the 50-metre butterfly. He broke the competition record in the 50-metre freestyle, with a time of 22.12 seconds.

=== 2008 Summer Olympics ===
Nicholas participated in the 2008 Summer Olympics in the 50-metre freestyle, where he reached the semi-finals, finishing in 16th position.

=== 2009–2012 ===
On 10 May 2009, he broke the South American record in the 4 × 100-metre freestyle, with a time of 3:14.45, along with Nicolas Oliveira, César Cielo, and Fernando Silva.

At the 2009 World Aquatics Championships in Rome, he qualified for the 50-metre butterfly finals, finishing in 5th place. He also reached the semi-finals of the 50-metre freestyle, with a time of 21.69 seconds, and finished in 10th place. On 2 September 2009, at the end of the José Finkel Trophy, he won with a time of 21.55 seconds, surpassing his personal best.

On 4 September 2009, he broke the Americas record for the 50-metre butterfly, with a time of 22.87 seconds. This record was broken by César Cielo just three years later, with a time of 22.76 seconds.

On 15 November 2009, in short pool (25 m), he completed the 50-metre freestyle in 20.90 seconds and became the first South American to swim the distance under 21 seconds. He shared with César Cielo the short-course South American record in the 50-metre freestyle: 21.32 seconds. He established the time in 2004 and Cielo in 2008.

He was champion of the 2009 FINA Swimming World Cup at the Singapore step in November 2009, beating the Olympic Champion Roland Schoeman in the finals of both the 50-metre butterfly and the 50-metre freestyle. At this World Cup, he broke the South American record of the 50-metre butterfly with a time of 22.17 seconds in Berlin and 22.16 seconds in Singapore and the South American record of the 50-metre freestyle with a time of 20.74 seconds in Berlin.

In August 2010, at the 2010 Pan Pacific Swimming Championships in Irvine, California, United States, Nicholas earned the silver medal in 50-metre butterfly. He also finished 13th in the 50-metre freestyle.

In December 2010, at the 2010 FINA World Swimming Championships (25 m) in Dubai, Nicholas Santos, along with César Cielo, Marcelo Chierighini, and Nicolas Oliveira, won the bronze medal in the 4 × 100-metre freestyle with a time of 3:05.74, South American record, leaving behind the American team. Nicholas also got the 13th place in the 50-metre freestyle and 4th place in the 50-metre butterfly.

At the 2011 Pan American Games in Guadalajara, Nicholas won the gold medal in the 4 × 100-metre freestyle.

In April 2012, he improved his personal best in 50-metre butterfly to 22.79 seconds.

=== 2012 Summer Olympics ===
He participated in 2012 Summer Olympics in London, in the 4 × 100-metre freestyle, where he finished in 9th place.

=== 2012–2016 ===
In December 2012, already 32 years old, Nicholas Santos attended the 2012 FINA World Swimming Championships (25 m) in Istanbul and won the gold medal in the 50-metre butterfly with a time of 22.22 seconds, beating the Championship record.

At the 2013 World Aquatics Championships in Barcelona, Santos qualified to the 50-metre butterfly finals in the first place, with a time of 22.81 seconds. In the finals, his time worsened to 23.21 seconds, finishing in 4th place. In the 4 × 100-metre medley, he finished 12th, along with Leonardo de Deus, Felipe Lima, and Marcelo Chierighini.

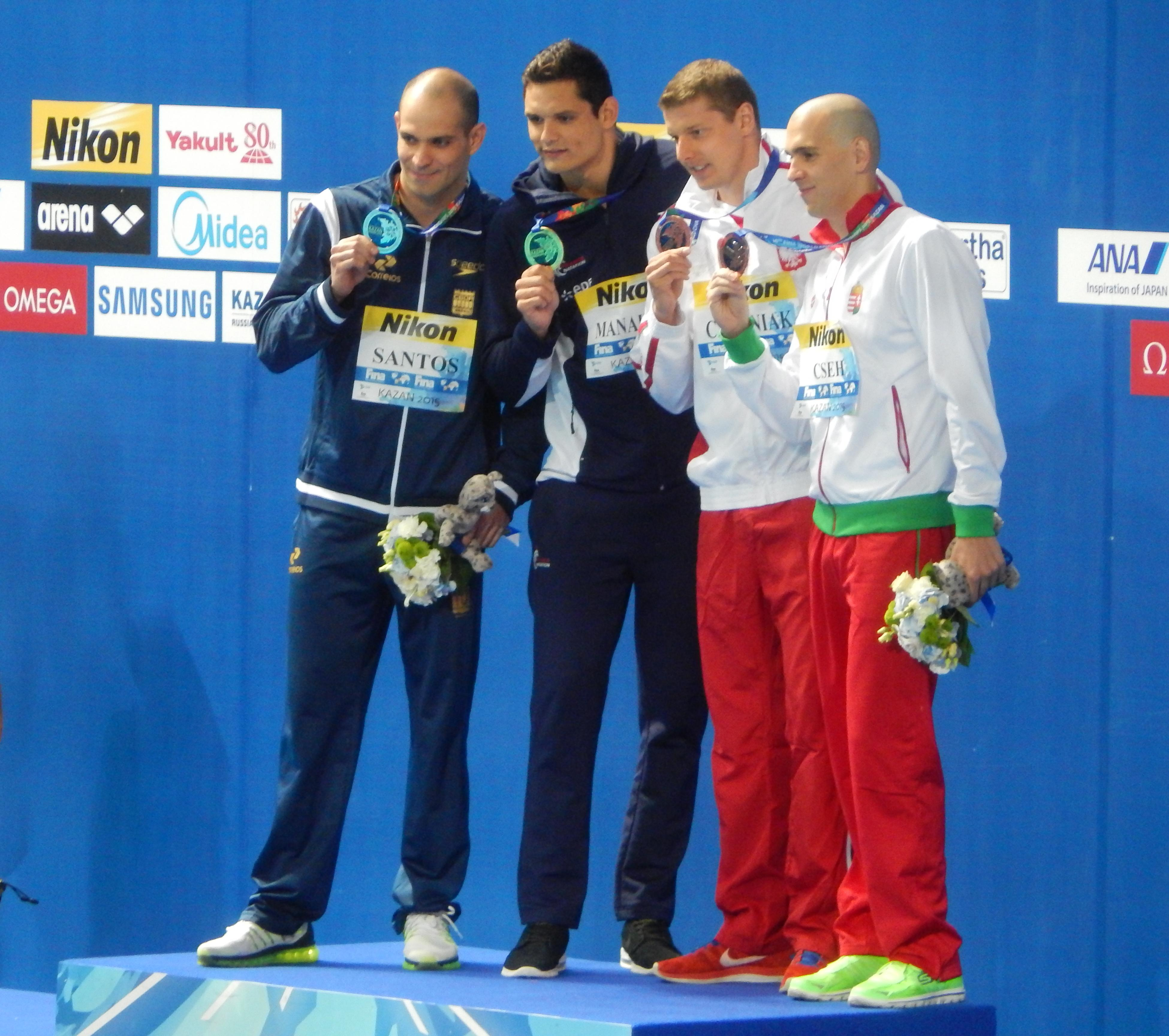
Santos (left) wins silver in Kazan 2015

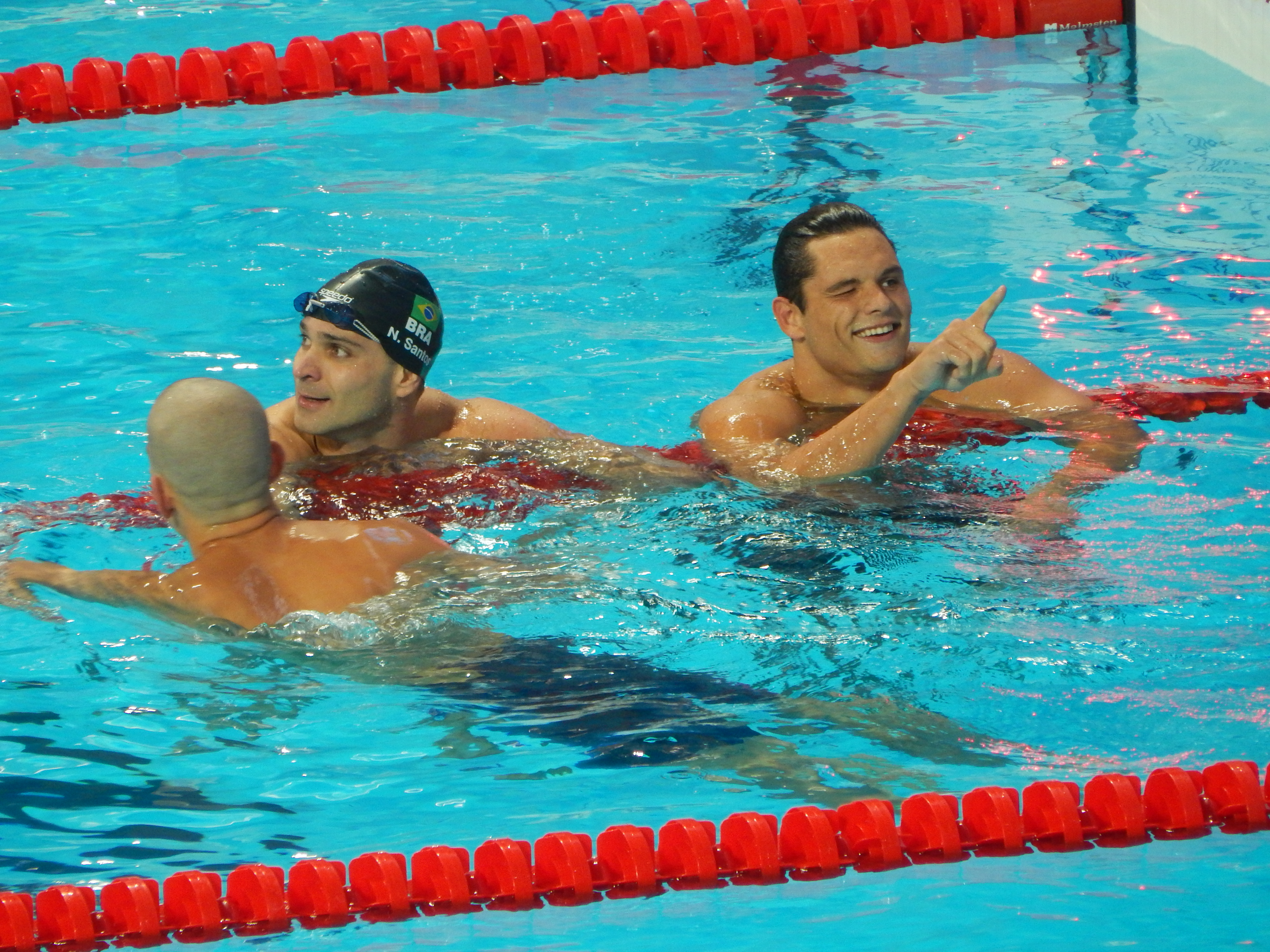
Santos (centre) wins silver in Kazan 2015

At the 2013 FINA Swimming World Cup in Beijing, China, Santos broke the short-course South American record in the 50-metre butterfly, with a time of 22.13.

At the 2014 Pan Pacific Swimming Championships in Gold Coast, Queensland, Australia, he finished 8th in the 100-metre butterfly, and 16th in the 50-metre freestyle.

At the 2014 FINA World Swimming Championships (25 m) in Doha, Qatar, Santos won two gold medals on the same day. At 4 December, in the Men's 4 × 50 metre medley relay, formed by Santos, César Cielo, Felipe França Silva and Guilherme Guido, considered the "Dream Team" by Cielo (formed only by medalists or world champions in their respective individual events), Brazil won the gold shattering the world record with a time of 1:30.51. At the same day, he also won the gold medal in the 4 × 50 metre mixed medley relay, along with Felipe França Silva, Etiene Medeiros and Larissa Oliveira, breaking the South American record with a time of 1:37.26, only 0.09 seconds from beating USA's world record (1:37.17). Santos was also trying to defend his title in the Men's 50 metre butterfly, obtained in Istanbul 2012. In the final, he faced Chad le Clos, the world's best butterfly swimmer at the time, World and Olympic champion. Santos broke the Americas record, with a time of 22.08, but lost the gold to the South African, who broke the Championship record, with a time of 21.95. Santos also swam the Men's 100 metre butterfly, finishing in 14th place.

At the 2015 Pan American Games in Toronto, Ontario, Canada, Santos finished 10th in the 50-metre freestyle.

At the 2015 World Aquatics Championships in Kazan, Santos, 35 years old, won one of the most important medals in his career, the silver medal in the Men's 50 metre butterfly. He became the oldest medalist in the history of the World Championships – aged 35 years and 171 days old, broke the record of Mark Warnecke, gold medalist of the 50 breaststroke at Montreal 2005, which took the podium at 35 years and 162 days old.

=== 2016–2022 ===
At the 2016 FINA World Swimming Championships (25 m) in Windsor, Ontario, Canada, he won a silver medal at the 4 × 50 metre mixed medley relay, along with Etiene Medeiros, Larissa Oliveira and Felipe Lima. He also finished 9th in the Men's 50 metre butterfly and 32nd in the Men's 50 metre freestyle.

At the age of 37, at the Maria Lenk Trophy held in May 2017, he was able to beat the Americas record in the 50m butterfly, with a time of 22.61, being close to the world record of 22.43 did by Rafa Muñoz, at the super-suits era.

At the 2017 World Aquatics Championships in Budapest, in the Men's 50 metre butterfly, he won again the silver medal, with a time of 22.79. He broke a record that was his own: the oldest athlete in history to win a medal in the World Championships.

At the 2018 FINA Swimming World Cup in Budapest, he broke the short-course World Record in the 50-metre butterfly, with a time of 21.75.

At the 2018 FINA World Swimming Championships (25 m) in Hangzhou, China, in the Men's 50 metre butterfly, Santos won the gold medal with a time of 21.81, a new Championship record. He also won a bronze medal in the Men's 4 × 50 metre medley relay, along with Guilherme Guido, Felipe Lima and César Cielo. In the Men's 4 × 100 metre medley relay, he finished 4th, and also finished 9th in the Mixed 4 × 50 metre medley relay.

At the age of 39, at the FINA Champions Swim Series held in May 2019 in Budapest, he was able to beat the Americas record in the 50m butterfly, with a time of 22.60. That was the best time of the year.

Santos went to the 2019 World Aquatics Championships in Gwangju, South Korea thanks to an invitation from FINA, due to the fact that the CBDA, the Brazilian Swimming Confederation, only summoned to this Championship the swimmers of Olympic events. There he won the bronze medal in the Men's 50 metre butterfly at the age of 39, "updating" his record for the oldest swimmer in the world to win a World Championship medal.

At the 2021 FINA World Swimming Championships (25 m) in Abu Dhabi, United Arab Emirates, in the Men's 50 metre butterfly, Santos won the gold medal with a time of 21.93. At almost 42 years old, he extended his own record for the oldest swimmer ever to win a world championship title. He also became the 2nd Brazilian with more medals in the Short Course World Championships, only behind César Cielo.

At the 2022 World Aquatics Championships in Budapest, in the 50m butterfly, he won his third silver at World Championships, and his fourth medal in a row, at age 42, with a time of 22.78, again updating his record for oldest swimmer in history to win a medal in World Championships.

On 14 December 2022, at the 2022 FINA World Swimming Championships (25 m), in Melbourne, Australia, in the 50-metre butterfly, Santos won his fourth world championship title with a time of 21.78, breaking the Championship Record, 0.03s off his own world record of 21.75. At the age of 42 years and 303 days, he broke his own Guinness World Record for being the oldest swimmer to win a world title and being the only and first swimmer in the world to be a four-time world champion in the 50m butterfly event. After the gold medal ceremony, he announced his retirement from the sport.

== Records ==
Nicholas Santos is the current holder, or former holder, of the following records:

Long course (50 m):

- Americas record holder of the 50-metre butterfly: 22.60, time. Retrieved 9 May 2019
- Former South American record holder of the 4 × 100-metre freestyle: 3:14.15, time. Retrieved 10 May 2009, along with Nicolas Oliveira, Fernando Silva, and César Cielo

Short course (25 m):

- Co-World record holder of the 50-metre butterfly: 21.75, time. Retrieved 6 October 2018
- Former South American record holder of the 50-metre freestyle: 20.74, time. Retrieved 15 November 2009
- South American record holder of the 4 × 100-metre freestyle: 3:05.74, time. Retrieved 15 December 2010, along with Nicolas Oliveira, Marcelo Chierighini, and César Cielo
- World record holder of the 4 × 50-metre medley: 1:30.51, time. Retrieved 4 December 2014, along with Felipe França Silva, Guilherme Guido, and César Cielo
- South American record holder of the 4 × 50-metre mixed medley: 1:37.26, time. Retrieved 4 December 2014, along with Felipe França Silva, Etiene Medeiros, and Larissa Oliveira
