= Cerian Gibbes =

Trinidad and Tobago swimmer (born 1982)

Personal information
- Born: 25 September 1982 (age 43)

Sport
- Sport: Swimming

Cerian Gibbes (born 25 September 1982) is a Trinidad and Tobago swimmer. She competed in two events at the 1996 Summer Olympics.
