= 2018 Pan Pacific Swimming Championships – Men's 100 metre freestyle =

Men's 100 metre freestyle at the 2018 Pan Pacific Swimming Championships
- Venue: Tokyo Tatsumi International Swimming Center
- Dates: 10 August (heats & finals)
- Competitors: 38 from 13 nations
- Winning time: 48.00

Medalists
gold medal	Kyle Chalmers	Australia
silver medal	Jack Cartwright	Australia
silver medal	Caeleb Dressel	United States

The men's 100 metre freestyle competition at the 2018 Pan Pacific Swimming Championships took place on August 10 at the Tokyo Tatsumi International Swimming Center. The defending champion was Cameron McEvoy of Australia.

== Records ==
Prior to this competition, the existing world and Pan Pacific records were as follows:

World record	César Cielo (BRA)	46.91	Rome, Italy	30 July 2009
Pan Pacific Championships record	Cameron McEvoy (AUS)	47.82	Gold Coast, Australia	22 August 2014

== Results ==
All times are in minutes and seconds.

KEY:	QA	Qualified A Final	QB	Qualified B Final	CR	Championships record	NR	National record	PB	Personal best	SB	Seasonal best

=== Heats ===
The first round was held on 10 August from 10:00.

Only two swimmers from each country may advance to the A or B final. If a country does not qualify any swimmer to the A final, that same country may qualify up to three swimmers to the B final.

Rank	Name	Nationality	Time	Notes
1	Zachary Apple	United States	48.05	QA
2	Caeleb Dressel	United States	48.13	QA
3	Blake Pieroni	United States	48.21	QB
4	Kyle Chalmers	Australia	48.23	QA
5	Pedro Spajari	Brazil	48.38	QA
6	Jack Cartwright	Australia	48.43	QA
7	Marcelo Chierighini	Brazil	48.44	QA
8	Nathan Adrian	United States	48.47	QB
9	Katsumi Nakamura	Japan	48.56	QA
10	Shinri Shioura	Japan	48.68	QA
11	Townley Haas	United States	48.69	
12	Gabriel Santos	Brazil	48.72	QB
13	Alexander Graham	Australia	48.75	~~QB~~, WD
14	James Roberts	Australia	48.83	~~QB~~, WD
15	Andrew Seliskar	United States	48.99	
15	Katsuhiro Matsumoto	Japan	48.99	QB
17	Clyde Lewis	Australia	49.08	
18	Yuri Kisil	Canada	49.16	QB
19	Marco Ferreira Júnior	Brazil	49.23	QB
20	Juran Mizohata	Japan	49.51	QB
21	Javier Acevedo	Canada	49.70	~~QB~~, WD
22	Daniel Hunter	New Zealand	49.86	QB
23	Ruslan Gaziev	Canada	49.87	
24	Reo Sakata	Japan	49.91	
25	Will Pisani	Canada	50.05	
26	Owen Daly	Canada	50.11	
27	Yuki Kobori	Japan	50.12	
28	Ippei Watanabe	Japan	50.18	
29	Elijah Winnington	Australia	50.44	
30	Grant Irvine	Australia	50.56	
31	Liu Shaofeng	China	50.69	
32	Rafael Barreto	Philippines	53.10	
33	Samir Al-Adawi	Oman	53.25	
34	Noel Keane	Palau	55.94	NR
35	Armand Chan	Philippines	56.05	
36	Lennosuke Suzuki	Northern Mariana Islands	57.73	
37	Mark Imazu	Guam	1:00.30	
–	Federico Grabich	Argentina	DNS	

=== B Final ===
The B final was held on 10 August from 18:00.

Rank	Name	Nationality	Time	Notes
9	Blake Pieroni	United States	48.21	
10	Nathan Adrian	United States	48.32	
11	Yuri Kisil	Canada	49.00	
12	Gabriel Santos	Brazil	49.24	
13	Juran Mizohata	Japan	49.41	
14	Katsuhiro Matsumoto	Japan	49.51	
15	Marco Ferreira Júnior	Brazil	49.60	
16	Daniel Hunter	New Zealand	49.89	

=== A Final ===
The A final was held on 10 August from 18:00.

Rank	Name	Nationality	Time	Notes
1st place, gold medalist(s)	Kyle Chalmers	Australia	48.00	
2nd place, silver medalist(s)	Jack Cartwright	Australia	48.22	
2nd place, silver medalist(s)	Caeleb Dressel	United States	48.22	
4	Marcelo Chierighini	Brazil	48.36	
5	Zachary Apple	United States	48.47	
6	Katsumi Nakamura	Japan	48.49	
7	Pedro Spajari	Brazil	48.51	
8	Shinri Shioura	Japan	48.68	
