= Swimming at the 2020 Summer Olympics – Men's 4 × 100 metre freestyle relay =

Men's 4 × 100 metre freestyle relay at the Games of the XXXII Olympiad
- Venue: Tokyo Aquatics Centre
- Dates: 25 July 2021 (heats); 26 July 2021 (final)
- Competitors: 70 from 16 nations
- Teams: 16
- Winning time: 3:08.97

Medalists
1st place, gold medalist(s)		Caeleb Dressel, Blake Pieroni, Bowe Becker, Zach Apple, Brooks Curry*	United States
2nd place, silver medalist(s)		Alessandro Miressi, Thomas Ceccon, Lorenzo Zazzeri, Manuel Frigo, Santo Condorelli*	Italy
3rd place, bronze medalist(s)		Matthew Temple, Zac Incerti, Alexander Graham, Kyle Chalmers, Cameron McEvoy*; *Indicates the swimmer only competed in the preliminary heats.	Australia

The men's 4 × 100 metre freestyle relay event at the 2020 Summer Olympics was held on 25 and 26 July 2021 at the Tokyo Aquatics Centre. It was the thirteenth appearance of the event, which has been held from 1964 to 1972 and then at every Games since 1984.

The medals for the competition were presented by Robin E. Mitchell, IOC Executive Board Member; Fiji, and the medalists' bouquets were presented by Mustapha Larfaoui, FINA Honorary Life President; Algeria.

== Summary ==
The U.S. men defended their title from Rio five years earlier, producing the fastest swim in 13 years. Caeleb Dressel (47.26) gave the U.S. an early lead which Blake Pieroni (47.58) and Bowe Becker (47.44) would maintain over the next 200 m. With Italy two-tenths off a second back after the final changeover, Zach Apple had a sterling anchor leg of 46.69 to separate the U.S. from the field and touch first in 3:08.97.

Meanwhile Italy's Alessandro Miressi (47.72), Thomas Ceccon (47.45) and Lorenzo Zazzeri (47.31) moved from fourth to second before handing over to Manuel Frigo (47.63) who ensured the Italians their first-ever medal in the event, winning silver in a national record of 3:10.11. Australia's Matthew Temple (48.07), Zac Incerti (47.55) and Alexander Graham (48.16), struggled to chase against the rest of the teams throughout the race, until anchor Kyle Chalmers launched a late attack on the home stretch with a 46.44 split - the fastest in the field - to deliver the Australian quartet their second-straight bronze medal in 3:10.22. Swimming in lane 1, Canada were surprisingly in podium contention after receiving strong splits from Brent Hayden (47.99), Joshua Liendo (47.51) and Yuri Kisil (47.15). While Markus Thormeyer (48.17) could not hold off Chalmers's powerful finish, the Canadians shattered their national record to place fourth in 3:10.82.

Hungary's Kristóf Milák (48.24), Szebasztián Szabó (47.44), Richárd Bohus (47.81) and Nándor Németh (47.57) improved throughout the race to come fifth in a national record of 3:11.06. While France received a strong start from Maxime Grousset (47.52) - only 0.26 off the U.S.' Dressel - Florent Manaudou (47.62), Clément Mignon (48.01) and Mehdy Metella (47.94) could not maintain the pace, coming sixth in 3:11.09. While Andrei Minakov (47.71) kept ROC in third at the 100 m mark, the pre-race favourites struggled to mount a challenge against the field and fell to seventh in 3:12.20. Brazil (3:13.41) rounded out the championship field.

== Records ==
Prior to this competition, the existing world and Olympic records were as follows.

World record	United States; Michael Phelps (47.51); Garrett Weber-Gale (47.02); Cullen Jones (47.65); Jason Lezak (46.06)	3:08.24	Beijing, China	11 August 2008
Olympic record	United States; Michael Phelps (47.51); Garrett Weber-Gale (47.02); Cullen Jones (47.65); Jason Lezak (46.06)	3:08.24	Beijing, China	11 August 2008

No new records were set during the competition.

== Qualification ==
The top 12 teams in this event at the 2019 World Aquatics Championships qualified for the Olympics. An additional 4 teams will qualify through having the fastest times at approved qualifying events during the qualifying period (1 March 2019 to 30 May 2020).

== Competition format ==
The competition consists of two rounds: heats and a final. The relay teams with the best 8 times in the heats advance to the final. Swim-offs are used as necessary to break ties for advancement to the next round.

== Schedule ==
All times are Japan Standard Time (UTC+9)

Date	Time	Round
Sunday, 25 July 2021	20:30	Heats
Monday, 26 July 2021	12:05	Final

== Results ==
=== Heats ===
The relay teams with the top 8 times, regardless of heat, advanced to the final.

Rank	Heat	Lane	Nation	Swimmers	Time	Notes
1	1	5	Italy	Alessandro Miressi (47.46); Santo Condorelli (47.90); Lorenzo Zazzeri (47.29); Manuel Frigo (47.64)	3:10.29	Q, NR
2	2	4	United States	Brooks Curry (48.84); Blake Pieroni (47.71); Bowen Becker (47.59); Zach Apple (47.19)	3:11.33	Q
3	2	5	Australia	Cameron McEvoy (49.18); Zac Incerti (47.64); Alexander Graham (48.44); Kyle Chalmers (46.63)	3:11.89	Q
4	1	6	France	Clément Mignon (48.58); Maxime Grousset (47.41); Charles Rihoux (48.27); Mehdy Metella (48.09)	3:12.35	Q
5	1	3	Brazil	Breno Correia (48.67); Pedro Spajari (48.15); Gabriel Santos (48.43); Marcelo Chierighini (47.34)	3:12.59	Q
6	2	6	Hungary	Kristóf Milák (48.56); Szebasztián Szabó (48.44); Richárd Bohus (48.27); Nándor Németh (47.46)	3:12.73	Q
7	2	2	Canada	Brent Hayden (48.51); Joshua Liendo (47.67); Ruslan Gaziev (49.04); Yuri Kisil (47.78)	3:13.00	Q
8	1	4	ROC	Vladislav Grinev (48.39); Andrey Minakov (47.48); Vladimir Morozov (48.13); Aleksandr Shchegolev (49.13)	3:13.13	Q
9	2	3	Great Britain	Matthew Richards (48.23); James Guy (48.03); Joe Litchfield (49.41); Jacob Whittle (47.50)	3:13.17	
10	1	7	Serbia	Velimir Stjepanović (48.74); Andrej Barna (47.50); Uroš Nikolić (48.94); Nikola Aćin (48.53)	3:13.71	NR
11	1	8	Poland	Karol Ostrowski (48.67); Kacper Majchrzak (49.02); Konrad Czerniak (48.51); Jakub Kraska (47.68)	3:13.88	NR
12	2	1	Netherlands	Nyls Korstanje (49.15); Stan Pijnenburg (47.35); Thom de Boer (49.39); Jesse Puts (48.18)	3:14.07	
13	1	1	Japan	Katsumi Nakamura (48.56); Shinri Shioura (48.63); Akira Namba (48.66); Kaiya Seki (48.59)	3:14.44	
14	2	7	Switzerland	Roman Mityukov (48.46); Nils Liess (49.17); Noè Ponti (48.62); Antonio Djakovic (48.40)	3:14.65	
15	1	2	Greece	Andreas Vazaios (48.65); Kristian Gkolomeev (47.95); Odysseus Meladinis (49.69); Apostolos Christou (49.00)	3:15.29	
16	2	8	Germany	Damian Wierling (48.96); Marius Kusch (48.71); Christoph Fildebrandt (48.72); Jan Eric Friese (48.95)	3:15.34	

=== Final ===
Rank	Lane	Nation	Swimmers	Time	Notes
1st place, gold medalist(s)	5	United States	Caeleb Dressel (47.26); Blake Pieroni (47.58); Bowe Becker (47.44); Zach Apple (46.69)	3:08.97	
2nd place, silver medalist(s)	4	Italy	Alessandro Miressi (47.72); Thomas Ceccon (47.45); Lorenzo Zazzeri (47.31); Manuel Frigo (47.63)	3:10.11	NR
3rd place, bronze medalist(s)	3	Australia	Matthew Temple (48.07); Zac Incerti (47.55); Alexander Graham (48.16); Kyle Chalmers (46.44)	3:10.22	
4	1	Canada	Brent Hayden (47.99); Joshua Liendo (47.51); Yuri Kisil (47.15); Markus Thormeyer (48.17)	3:10.82	NR
5	7	Hungary	Kristóf Milák (48.24); Szebasztián Szabó (47.44); Richárd Bohus (47.81); Nándor Németh (47.57)	3:11.06	NR
6	6	France	Maxime Grousset (47.52); Florent Manaudou (47.62); Clément Mignon (48.01); Mehdy Metella (47.94)	3:11.09	
7	8	ROC	Andrei Minakov (47.71); Vladislav Grinev (47.94); Vladimir Morozov (48.15); Kliment Kolesnikov (48.40)	3:12.20	
8	2	Brazil	Breno Correia (48.69); Pedro Spajari (48.24); Gabriel Santos (48.76); Marcelo Chierighini (47.72)	3:13.41	
