= 2022 FINA World Swimming Championships (25 m) – Men's 4 × 50 metre freestyle relay =

Swimming competition

Men's 4 × 50 metre freestyle relay at the 2022 FINA World Swimming Championships (25 m)
- Venue: Melbourne Sports and Aquatic Centre
- Location: Melbourne, Australia
- Dates: 15 December (heats and finals)
- Competitors: 62 from 15 nations
- Teams: 15
- Winning time: 1:23.44

Medalists
gold medal	Isaac Cooper; Matthew Temple; Flynn Southam; Kyle Chalmers; Grayson Bell	Australia
silver medal	Alessandro Miressi; Leonardo Deplano; Thomas Ceccon; Manuel Frigo; Paolo Conte Bonin	Italy
bronze medal	Kenzo Simons; Nyls Korstanje; Stan Pijnenburg; Thom de Boer	Netherlands

The Men's 4 × 50 metre freestyle relay competition of the 2022 FINA World Swimming Championships (25 m) was held on 15 December 2022.

== Records ==
Prior to the competition, the existing world and championship records were as follows.

World record	United States (USA)	1:21.80	Hangzhou, China	14 December 2018
Competition record	United States (USA)	1:21.80	Hangzhou, China	14 December 2018

== Results ==
=== Heats ===
The heats were started at 12:59.

Rank	Heat	Lane	Nation	Swimmers	Time	Notes
1	2	4	Netherlands	Kenzo Simons (21.28); Nyls Korstanje (20.79); Stan Pijnenburg (21.07); Thom de Boer (20.56)	1:23.70	Q
2	2	5	United States	David Curtiss (21.34); Drew Kibler (20.95); Hunter Armstrong (20.94); Shaine Casas (20.84)	1:24.07	Q
3	1	4	Italy	Alessandro Miressi (21.26); Leonardo Deplano (20.79); Manuel Frigo (21.07); Paolo Conte Bonin (21.01)	1:24.13	Q
4	1	2	Japan	Kosuke Matsui (21.14); Masahiro Kawane (20.89); Takeshi Kawamoto (21.06); Katsumi Nakamura (21.08)	1:24.17	Q, AS
5	1	1	Australia	Isaac Cooper (21.24); Grayson Bell (21.39); Flynn Southam (21.08); Matthew Temple (20.71)	1:24.42	Q
6	2	6	Brazil	Gabriel Santos (21.79); Pedro Spajari (21.31); Nicholas Santos (21.67); Lucas Peixoto (21.33)	1:26.10	Q
7	2	8	Spain	Carles Coll (21.78); Sergio de Celis (21.52); Mario Mollà (21.72); Luis Domínguez (21.27)	1:26.29	Q
8	2	2	Ukraine	Andrii Govorov (21.70); Illia Linnyk (20.97); Vladyslav Bukhov (20.94); Oleksandr Zheltiakov (22.92)	1:26.53	Q
9	2	1	Bulgaria	Josif Miladinov (22.15); Deniel Nankov (21.38); Kaloyan Bratanov (21.21); Antani Ivanov (21.84)	1:26.58	NR
10	2	7	New Zealand	Cameron Gray (21.71); Carter Swift (21.47); Zac Dell (21.57); George Williams (21.84)	1:26.59	NR
11	1	3	Hong Kong	Cheuk Ming Ho (22.93); Ian Ho (20.95); Ng Cheuk Yin (21.36); Hayden Kwan (22.35)	1:27.59	NR
12	1	8	South Africa	Clayton Jimmie (21.84); Simon Haddon (22.25); Kian Keylock (23.43); Pieter Coetze (21.75)	1:29.27	
13	1	6	Chinese Taipei	Wu Chun-feng (22.22); Cai Bing-rong (23.15); Wang Hsing-hao (22.83); Chuang Mu-lun (21.89)	1:30.09	
14	1	7	Paraguay	Ben Hockin (22.36); Renato Prono (23.03); Matheo Mateos (23.24); Charles Hockin (22.54)	1:31.17	
	2	3	Poland	Karol Ostrowski (21.39); Jakub Majerski; Ksawery Masiuk; Kacper Stokowski	Disqualified	
	1	5	China		Did not start	

=== Final ===
The final was held at 21:54.

Rank	Lane	Nation	Swimmers	Time	Notes
1st place, gold medalist(s)	2	Australia	Isaac Cooper (21.25); Matthew Temple (20.75); Flynn Southam (21.10); Kyle Chalmers (20.34)	1:23.44	OC
2nd place, silver medalist(s)	3	Italy	Alessandro Miressi (21.22); Leonardo Deplano (20.59); Thomas Ceccon (20.67); Manuel Frigo (21.00)	1:23.48	
3rd place, bronze medalist(s)	4	Netherlands	Kenzo Simons (21.24); Nyls Korstanje (20.84); Stan Pijnenburg (20.95); Thom de Boer (20.72)	1:23.75	
4	6	Japan	Kosuke Matsui (21.26); Masahiro Kawane (20.79); Takeshi Kawamoto (20.79); Katsumi Nakamura (20.96)	1:23.80	AS
5	5	United States	David Curtiss (21.16); Shaine Casas (20.83); Hunter Armstrong (20.94); Drew Kibler (21.10)	1:24.03	
6	1	Spain	Carles Coll (21.59); Luis Domínguez (21.08); Sergio de Celis (21.04); Mario Mollà (21.12)	1:24.83	NR
7	8	Ukraine	Andrii Govorov (21.78); Illia Linnyk (21.12); Vladyslav Bukhov (20.47); Oleksandr Zheltiakov (22.74)	1:26.11	
8	7	Brazil	Pedro Spajari (21.77); Gabriel Santos (21.81); Nicholas Santos (21.63); Lucas Peixoto (21.13)	1:26.34	
