= 2018 Pan Pacific Swimming Championships – Men's 4 × 100 metre freestyle relay =

Men's 4 × 100 metre freestyle relay at the 2018 Pan Pacific Swimming Championships
- Venue: Tokyo Tatsumi International Swimming Center
- Dates: 11 August
- Competitors: 24 from 6 nations
- Winning time: 3:12.02

Medalists
gold medal	Gabriel Santos; Marcelo Chierighini; Marco Ferreira Júnior; Pedro Spajari	Brazil
silver medal	Jack Cartwright; Alexander Graham; James Roberts; Kyle Chalmers	Australia
bronze medal	Katsumi Nakamura; Shinri Shioura; Katsuhiro Matsumoto; Juran Mizohata	Japan

The men's 4 × 100 metre freestyle relay competition at the 2018 Pan Pacific Swimming Championships took place on August 11 at the Tokyo Tatsumi International Swimming Center. The defending champion was Australia.

== Records ==
Prior to this competition, the existing world and Pan Pacific records were as follows:

World record	United States (USA); Michael Phelps (47.51); Garrett Weber-Gale (47.02); Cullen Jones (47.65); Jason Lezak (46.06)	3:08.24	Beijing, China	11 August 2008
Pan Pacific Championships record	United States (USA); Michael Phelps (48.13); Ryan Lochte (47.98); Jason Lezak (48.12); Nathan Adrian (47.51)	3:11.74	Irvine, United States	20 August 2010

== Results ==
All times are in minutes and seconds.

KEY:	CR	Championships record	NR	National record	PB	Personal best	SB	Seasonal best

=== Final ===
The final was held on 11 August from 18:00.

Rank	Lane	Nation	Swimmers	Time	Notes
1st place, gold medalist(s)	5	Brazil	Gabriel Santos (48.93); Marcelo Chierighini (47.62); Marco Ferreira Júnior (48.53); Pedro Spajari (46.94)	3:12.02	
2nd place, silver medalist(s)	3	Australia	Jack Cartwright (48.56); Alexander Graham (48.50); James Roberts (47.97); Kyle Chalmers (47.50)	3:12.53	
3rd place, bronze medalist(s)	6	Japan	Katsumi Nakamura (48.52); Shinri Shioura (48.19); Katsuhiro Matsumoto (47.61); Juran Mizohata (48.22)	3:12.54	AS
4	2	Canada	Markus Thormeyer (48.89); Yuri Kisil (48.02); Javier Acevedo (49.07); Ruslan Gaziev (48.52)	3:14.50	
5	7	Philippines	Rafael Barreto (53.19); Armand Chan (55.31); Timothy Yen (55.96); Jarod Hatch (52.55)	3:37.01	
–	4	United States	Caeleb Dressel (48.76); Blake Pieroni; Zachary Apple; Nathan Adrian	DSQ	
