= Swimming at the 2020 Summer Olympics – Men's 4 × 100 metre medley relay =

Men's 4 × 100 metre medley relay at the Games of the XXXII Olympiad
- Venue: Tokyo Aquatics Centre
- Dates: 30 July 2021 (heats); 1 August 2021 (final)
- Competitors: 74 from 16 nations
- Teams: 16
- Winning time: 3:26.78 WR

Medalists
1st place, gold medalist(s)		Ryan Murphy, Michael Andrew, Caeleb Dressel, Zach Apple, Hunter Armstrong*, Blake Pieroni*, Tom Shields*, Andrew Wilson*	United States
2nd place, silver medalist(s)		Luke Greenbank, James Guy, Adam Peaty, Duncan Scott, James Wilby*	Great Britain
3rd place, bronze medalist(s)		Thomas Ceccon, Nicolò Martinenghi, Federico Burdisso, Alessandro Miressi; *Indicates the swimmer only competed in the preliminary heats.	Italy

The men's 4 × 100 metre medley relay event at the 2020 Summer Olympics was held on 30 July and 1 August 2021 at the Tokyo Aquatics Centre. It was the event's sixteenth consecutive appearance, having been held at every edition since 1960.

The United States extended their dominance in the event, having won it every time since its introduction in 1960, except for the boycotted 1980 Games.

== Summary ==
In the final swimming race at these Games, the U.S. continued their unbeaten streak of winning the 4x100 Medley Relay to take gold in a world record time of 3:26.78, eclipsing the former super-suited mark by half a second. Though a shade off his bronze medal-winning time in the individual 100 m backstroke, Ryan Murphy (52.31) nonetheless got the U.S. out to an early lead of 0.21 seconds. While Michael Andrew's breaststroke split of 58.49 led the U.S. to fall back in third, Caeleb Dressel unleashed the fastest butterfly split of all time in 49.03 to regain the lead. Diving in with a margin of 6-tenths of a second over the field, Zach Apple anchored the U.S. home to gold in 46.95 for their eleventh swimming gold of the Games.

100 m breaststroke world record holder Adam Peaty threw down the fastest breaststroke split ever in 56.53 to give the British team of Luke Greenbank (53.63), James Guy (50.27), and Duncan Scott (47.08) a brief lead of 0.6 seconds on the second leg. Though the U.S. edged them out to the front in the following leg, Great Britain touched in a European record of 3:27.51 - the third fastest performance in history - to defend their silver medal from five years earlier in Rio.

Meanwhile, Italy's well-rounded foursome of Thomas Ceccon (52.52), Nicolò Martinenghi (58.11), Federico Burdisso (51.07) and Alessandro Miressi (47.47) posted a national record of 3:29.17 to secure Italy's first podium finish in the event. Despite a strong back-half - with Andrey Minakov (50.31) and Kliment Kolesnikov (47.03) recording the third-fastest butterfly and freestyle splits in the field - ROC could not close the gap on the Italians to miss the podium by 5-hundredths of a second. Australia, the defending bronze medallists, could not repeat their podium finish, falling to fifth in 3:29.60. Japan took sixth in 3:29.91, breaking China's 2018 Asian record by 0.08 s, while Canada (3:32.42) finished in a distant seventh. China was disqualified from the race owing to an early relay takeover by freestyler He Junyi.

== Records ==
Prior to this competition, the existing world and Olympic records were as follows.

World record	United States (USA); Aaron Peirsol (52.19); Eric Shanteau (58.57); Michael Phelps (49.72); David Walters (46.80)	3:27.28	Rome, Italy	2 August 2009
Olympic record	United States; Ryan Murphy (51.85); Cody Miller (59.03); Michael Phelps (50.33); Nathan Adrian (46.74)	3:27.95	Rio de Janeiro, Brazil	13 August 2016

The following record was established during the competition:

Date	Event	Name	Nation	Time	Record
1 August	Final	Ryan Murphy (52.31); Michael Andrew (58.49); Caeleb Dressel (49.03); Zach Apple (46.95)	United States	3:26.78	WR

== Qualification ==
The top 12 teams in this event at the 2019 World Aquatics Championships qualified for the Olympics. An additional 4 teams will qualify through having the fastest times at approved qualifying events during the qualifying period (1 March 2019 to 30 May 2020).

== Competition format ==
The competition consists of two rounds: heats and a final. The relay teams with the best 8 times in the heats advance to the final. Swim-offs are used as necessary to break ties for advancement to the next round.

== Schedule ==
All times are Japan Standard Time (UTC+9)

Date	Time	Round
30 July 2021	21:10	Heats
1 August 2021	11:36	Final

== Results ==
=== Heats ===
The relay teams with the top 8 times, regardless of heat, advanced to the final.

Rank	Heat	Lane	Nation	Swimmers	Time	Notes
1	1	5	Italy	Thomas Ceccon (53.20); Nicolò Martinenghi (57.94); Federico Burdisso (51.46); Alessandro Miressi (47.42)	3:30.02	Q
2	2	4	Great Britain	Luke Greenbank (53.79); James Wilby (59.16); James Guy (50.77); Duncan Scott (47.75)	3:31.47	Q
3	2	5	ROC	Grigoriy Tarasevich (53.20); Anton Chupkov (59.55); Mikhail Vekovishchev (51.20); Vladislav Grinev (47.71)	3:31.66	Q
4	1	6	China	Xu Jiayu (52.82); Yan Zibei (58.32); Sun Jiajun (51.81); He Junyi (48.77)	3:31.72	Q
5	2	3	Japan	Ryosuke Irie (53.20); Ryuya Mura (59.62); Naoki Mizunuma (51.42); Katsumi Nakamura (47.78)	3:32.02	Q
6	1	3	Australia	Mitch Larkin (53.46); Zac Stubblety-Cook (59.11); David Morgan (51.97); Kyle Chalmers (47.54)	3:32.08	Q
7	1	4	United States	Hunter Armstrong (53.51); Andrew Wilson (59.20); Tom Shields (51.33); Blake Pieroni (48.25)	3:32.29	Q
8	1	1	Canada	Markus Thormeyer (53.66); Gabe Mastromatteo (59.97); Joshua Liendo (50.92); Yuri Kisil (47.82)	3:32.37	Q
9	1	2	Poland	Kacper Stokowski (54.67); Jan Kozakiewicz (59.24); Jakub Majerski (50.66); Jakub Kraska (48.05)	3:32.62	NR
10	2	2	France	Yohann Ndoye Brouard (52.77); Antoine Viquerat (59.94); Léon Marchand (52.05); Mehdy Metella (48.65)	3:33.41	
11	2	7	Germany	Marek Ulrich (54.52); Lucas Matzerath (58.70); Marius Kusch (52.38); Damian Wierling (48.48)	3:34.08	
12	1	7	Belarus	Mikita Tsmyh (55.50); Ilya Shymanovich (58.20); Yauhen Tsurkin (52.38); Artsiom Machekin (48.74)	3:34.82	
13	1	8	Hungary	Richárd Bohus (53.51); Tamás Takács (1:00.57); Hubert Kós (51.94); Péter Holoda (48.89)	3:34.91	
14	2	1	Greece	Eyaggelos Makrygiannis (54.07); Konstadinos Meretsolias (1:00.62); Andreas Vazaios (53.36); Apostolos Christou (48.23)	3:36.28	
	2	6	Brazil	Guilherme Guido (54.11); Felipe Lima; Vinicius Lanza; Marcelo Chierighini	DSQ	
	2	8	Lithuania	Danas Rapšys (54.71); Andrius Šidlauskas; Deividas Margevičius; Simonas Bilis	DSQ	

=== Final ===
Rank	Lane	Nation	Swimmers	Time	Notes
1st place, gold medalist(s)	1	United States	Ryan Murphy (52.31); Michael Andrew (58.49); Caeleb Dressel (49.03); Zach Apple (46.95)	3:26.78	WR
2nd place, silver medalist(s)	5	Great Britain	Luke Greenbank (53.63); Adam Peaty (56.53); James Guy (50.27); Duncan Scott (47.08)	3:27.51	ER
3rd place, bronze medalist(s)	4	Italy	Thomas Ceccon (52.52); Nicolò Martinenghi (58.11); Federico Burdisso (51.07); Alessandro Miressi (47.47)	3:29.17	NR
4	3	ROC	Evgeny Rylov (52.82); Kirill Prigoda (59.06); Andrey Minakov (50.31); Kliment Kolesnikov (47.03)	3:29.22	
5	7	Australia	Mitch Larkin (53.19); Zac Stubblety-Cook (58.67); Matthew Temple (50.78); Kyle Chalmers (46.96)	3:29.60	
6	2	Japan	Ryosuke Irie (53.05); Ryuya Mura (58.94); Naoki Mizunuma (50.88); Katsumi Nakamura (47.04)	3:29.91	AS
7	8	Canada	Markus Thormeyer (53.69); Gabe Mastromatteo (59.67); Joshua Liendo (51.02); Yuri Kisil (48.04)	3:32.42	
	6	China	Xu Jiayu (52.77); Yan Zibei (58.35); Sun Jiajun (51.76); He Junyi	DSQ	
