= Swimming at the 2019 World Aquatics Championships – Men's 4 × 100 metre freestyle relay =

Men's 4 × 100 metre freestyle relay at the 2019 World Aquatics Championships
- Venue: Nambu University Municipal Aquatics Center
- Location: Gwangju, South Korea
- Dates: 21 July (heats and final)
- Competitors: 115 from 27 nations
- Teams: 27
- Winning time: 3:09.06

Medalists
gold medal	Caeleb Dressel; Blake Pieroni; Zach Apple; Nathan Adrian; Townley Haas; Michael Chadwick	United States
silver medal	Vladislav Grinev; Vladimir Morozov; Kliment Kolesnikov; Evgeny Rylov; Andrey Minakov	Russia
bronze medal	Cameron McEvoy; Clyde Lewis; Alexander Graham; Kyle Chalmers	Australia

The Men's 4 × 100 metre freestyle relay competition at the 2019 World Championships was held on 21 July 2019.

== Records ==
Prior to the competition, the existing world and championship records were as follows.

World record	United States	3:08.24	Beijing, China	11 August 2008
Competition record	United States	3:09.21	Rome, Italy	26 July 2009

The following new records were set during this competition.

Date	Event	Nation	Time	Record
21 July	Final	United States	3:09.06	CR

== Results ==
=== Heats ===
The heats were held at 12:32.

Rank	Heat	Lane	Nation	Swimmers	Time	Notes
1	1	5	United States	Townley Haas (48.60); Blake Pieroni (47.32); Michael Chadwick (47.92); Zach Apple (47.47)	3:11.31	Q
2	2	1	Great Britain	Duncan Scott (48.18); James Guy (47.77); Ben Proud (48.43); Scott McLay (48.04)	3:12.42	Q
3	2	4	Russia	Evgeny Rylov (48.31); Andrey Minakov (48.94); Kliment Kolesnikov (47.96); Vladislav Grinev (47.43)	3:12.64	Q
4	3	5	Australia	Cameron McEvoy (48.29); Clyde Lewis (47.99); Alexander Graham (48.39); Kyle Chalmers (47.98)	3:12.65	Q
5	3	3	Italy	Santo Condorelli (48.67); Manuel Frigo (47.90); Alessandro Bori (48.49); Alessandro Miressi (47.60)	3:12.66	Q
6	3	4	Brazil	Marcelo Chierighini (48.20); Pedro Spajari (48.14); André Calvelo (48.44); Breno Correia (48.19)	3:12.97	Q
7	3	8	France	Clément Mignon (48.26); Jérémy Stravius (48.21); Tom Paco Pedroni (48.41); Mehdy Metella (48.16)	3:13.04	Q
8	3	2	Hungary	Dominik Kozma (48.92); Nándor Németh (48.36); Richárd Bohus (48.79); Szebasztián Szabó (47.83)	3:13.90	Q
9	2	5	Japan	Katsumi Nakamura (48.48); Shinri Shioura (48.92); Katsuhiro Matsumoto (47.95); Akira Namba (48.81)	3:14.16	
10	2	2	Greece	Andreas Vazaios (49.22); Kristian Golomeev (47.60); Ioannis Georgarakis (49.50); Apostolos Christou (48.12)	3:14.44	
11	2	7	Germany	Damian Wierling (48.80); Marius Kusch (48.64); Josha Salchow (48.46); Christoph Fildebrandt (48.68)	3:14.58	
12	3	6	Poland	Kacper Majchrzak (48.95); Przemysław Gawrysiak (49.64); Jan Hołub (48.13); Jakub Kraska (48.06)	3:14.78	
13	2	6	Canada	Markus Thormeyer (48.80); Yuri Kisil (48.32); William Pisani (49.21); Carson Olafson (48.73)	3:15.06	
14	3	9	Belgium	Sebastien De Meulemeester (49.29); Jasper Aerents (48.81); Thomas Thijs (48.49); Pieter Timmers (48.75)	3:15.34	
15	3	1	Serbia	Velimir Stjepanović (49.59); Uroš Nikolić (48.48); Andrej Barna (48.29); Nikola Aćin (49.36)	3:15.72	
16	3	7	Netherlands	Jesse Puts (49.15); Nyls Korstanje (49.06); Kyle Stolk (48.34); Stan Pijnenburg (49.22)	3:15.77	
17	2	3	China	Yu Hexin (49.80); Yang Jintong (49.00); Cao Jiwen (48.87); He Junyi (48.56)	3:16.23	
18	2	8	Singapore	Joseph Schooling (49.32); Quah Zheng Wen (48.76); Jonathan Tan Eu Jin (49.63); Darren Chua Yi Shou (48.95)	3:16.66	NR
19	1	1	Switzerland	Roman Mityukov (49.42); Nils Liess (48.81); Antonio Djakovic (49.03); Aleksi Schmid (49.59)	3:16.85	
20	3	0	Ireland	Shane Ryan (49.40); Robert Powell (49.63); Jordan Sloan (48.72); Jack McMillan (49.63)	3:17.38	NR
21	1	3	Turkey	Hüseyin Emre Sakçı (49.43); İskender Başlakov (49.53); Kemal Arda Gürdal (49.61); Yalım Acımış (49.44)	3:18.01	
22	2	0	South Korea	Hwang Sun-woo (50.08); Jang Dong-hyeok (49.45); Park Seon-kwan (49.76); Yang Jae-hoon (48.80)	3:18.09	
23	2	9	Chinese Taipei	Wang Hsing-hao (50.45); Wang Yu-lian (50.10); Lin Chien-liang (51.01); An Ting-yao (50.25)	3:21.81	
24	1	7	Hong Kong	Nicholas Lim (51.34); Ian Ho Yentou (49.84); Cheuk Yin Ng (51.78); Ming Ho Cheuk (50.53)	3:23.49	
25	1	6	Malaysia	Welson Sim (50.47); Chan Jie (51.77); Tern Tern Jian Han (52.65); Faang der Tiaa (55.06)	3:29.95	
	1	2	Egypt	Mohamed Samy (49.59); Ali Khalafalla (48.79); Marwan Elkamash (51.92); Abdelrahman Sameh	Disqualified	
	1	4	Israel	Tomer Frankel (49.62); Meiron Cheruti; Yakov Toumarkin; Daniel Namir	Disqualified	

=== Final ===
The final was held at 21:23.

Rank	Lane	Nation	Swimmers	Time	Notes
1st place, gold medalist(s)	4	United States	Caeleb Dressel (47.63); Blake Pieroni (47.49); Zach Apple (46.86); Nathan Adrian (47.08)	3:09.06	CR
2nd place, silver medalist(s)	3	Russia	Vladislav Grinev (47.83); Vladimir Morozov (47.62); Kliment Kolesnikov (47.50); Evgeny Rylov (47.02)	3:09.97	
3rd place, bronze medalist(s)	6	Australia	Cameron McEvoy (48.44); Clyde Lewis (47.61); Alexander Graham (48.11); Kyle Chalmers (47.06)	3:11.22	
4	2	Italy	Santo Condorelli (48.72); Manuel Frigo (47.29); Luca Dotto (47.81); Alessandro Miressi (47.57)	3:11.39	NR
5	5	Great Britain	Duncan Scott (47.97); James Guy (47.72); Ben Proud (48.27); Scott McLay (47.85)	3:11.81	
6	7	Brazil	Marcelo Chierighini (48.10); Pedro Spajari (48.14); Bruno Fratus (47.78); Breno Correia (47.97)	3:11.99	
7	8	Hungary	Dominik Kozma (48.59); Kristóf Milák (48.05); Péter Holoda (48.53); Nándor Németh (47.68)	3:12.85	
8	1	France	Clément Mignon (48.25); Jérémy Stravius (48.33); Tom Paco Pedroni (48.92); Mehdy Metella (47.84)	3:13.34	
