= Swimming at the 2017 World Aquatics Championships – Men's 4 × 100 metre freestyle relay =

Men's 4 × 100 metre freestyle relay at the 2017 World Aquatics Championships
- Venue: Danube Arena
- Location: Budapest, Hungary
- Dates: 23 July (heats and final)
- Competitors: 83 from 20 nations
- Teams: 20
- Winning time: 3:10.06

Medalists
| gold medal | Caeleb Dressel; Townley Haas; Blake Pieroni; Nathan Adrian; Zach Apple; Michael Chadwick | United States |
| silver medal | Gabriel Santos; Marcelo Chierighini; César Cielo; Bruno Fratus | Brazil |
| bronze medal | Dominik Kozma; Nándor Németh; Péter Holoda; Richárd Bohus | Hungary |

The Men's 4 × 100 metre freestyle relay competition at the 2017 World Championships was held on 23 July 2017.

== Records ==
Prior to the competition, the existing world and championship records were as follows.

| World record | United States | 3:08.24 | Beijing, China | 11 August 2008 |
| Competition record | United States | 3:09.21 | Rome, Italy | 26 July 2009 |

== Results ==
=== Heats ===
The heats were held at 11:50.

| Rank | Heat | Lane | Nation | Swimmers | Time | Notes |
|---|---|---|---|---|---|---|
| 1 | 1 | 5 | Brazil | Gabriel Santos (48.84); Marcelo Chierighini (47.75); César Cielo (48.15); Bruno Fratus (47.60) | 3:12.34 | Q |
| 2 | 1 | 4 | Australia | Cameron McEvoy (48.04); Zac Incerti (48.62); Alexander Graham (48.28); Jack Cartwright (47.51) | 3:12.45 | Q |
| 3 | 2 | 4 | United States | Blake Pieroni (48.40); Michael Chadwick (48.74); Zach Apple (48.16); Townley Haas (47.60) | 3:12.90 | Q |
| 4 | 2 | 6 | Italy | Luca Dotto (49.05); Ivano Vendrame (47.85); Alessandro Miressi (47.94); Filippo Magnini (48.42) | 3:13.26 | Q |
| 5 | 2 | 2 | Hungary | Dominik Kozma (48.61); Nándor Németh (48.52); Péter Holoda (48.08); Richárd Bohus (48.07) | 3:13.28 | Q, NR |
| 6 | 2 | 5 | Russia | Aleksandr Popkov (49.05); Nikita Korolev (48.43); Nikita Lobintsev (47.96); Vladimir Morozov (48.40) | 3:13.84 | Q |
| 7 | 1 | 3 | Japan | Katsumi Nakamura (48.71); Shinri Shioura (48.40); Katsuhiro Matsumoto (48.48); Junya Koga (49.23) | 3:14.82 | Q |
| 8 | 2 | 3 | Canada | Yuri Kisil (48.88); Markus Thormeyer (48.50); Javier Acevedo (48.43); Carson Olafson (49.07) | 3:14.88 | Q |
| 9 | 2 | 0 | Serbia | Velimir Stjepanović (48.77); Sebastian Sabo (48.60); Ivan Lenđer (48.87); Andrej Barna (49.40) | 3:15.64 | NR |
| 10 | 1 | 9 | Netherlands | Kyle Stolk (49.40); Stan Pijnenburg (48.91); Ben Schwietert (48.97); Jesse Puts (48.81) | 3:16.09 | |
| 11 | 1 | 6 | Greece | Apostolos Christou (49.36); Odysseus Meladinis (49.65); Christos Katrantzis (50.04); Kristian Golomeev (47.87) | 3:16.92 | |
| 12 | 2 | 7 | South Africa | Douglas Erasmus (49.99); Clayton Jimmie (49.64); Myles Brown (48.71); Zane Waddell (49.07) | 3:17.41 | |
| 13 | 1 | 8 | China | Lin Yongqing (49.57); Yu Hexin (48.97); Cao Jiwen (49.53); Ma Tianchi (49.62) | 3:17.69 | |
| 14 | 1 | 0 | New Zealand | Matthew Stanley (49.58); Sam Perry (49.35); Corey Main (49.22); Daniel Hunter (49.59) | 3:17.74 | |
| 15 | 1 | 7 | Egypt | Ali Khalafalla (49.80); Mohamed Samy (48.89); Youssef Abdalla (50.27); Mohamed Hussein (49.27) | 3:18.23 | NR |
| 16 | 1 | 2 | Belarus | Artsiom Machekin (49.43); Viktar Krasochka (49.22); Viktar Staselovich (50.55); Anton Latkin (50.42) | 3:19.62 | |
| 17 | 2 | 9 | Israel | Liran Konovalov (50.48); Yakov Toumarkin (50.00); Denis Loktev (50.39); Tomer Frankel (50.36) | 3:21.23 | |
| 18 | 2 | 8 | Latvia | Uvis Kalniņš (50.15); Daniils Bobrovs (52.36); Nikolajs Maskaļenko (51.32); Girts Feldbergs (50.57) | 3:24.40 | NR |
| 19 | 2 | 1 | Uzbekistan | Aleksey Tarasenko (51.45); Artyom Kozlyuk (50.96); Daniil Bukin (52.74); Khurshidjon Tursunov (49.95) | 3:25.10 | |
| 20 | 1 | 1 | Paraguay | Charles Hockin (50.99); Willian Vallejos (52.78); Matias Lopez (52.06); Benjamin Hockin (50.15) | 3:25.98 | |

=== Final ===
The final was held at 18:52.

| Rank | Lane | Nation | Swimmers | Time | Notes |
|---|---|---|---|---|---|
| 1st place, gold medalist(s) | 3 | United States | Caeleb Dressel (47.26 NR); Townley Haas (47.46); Blake Pieroni (48.09); Nathan Adrian (47.25) | 3:10.06 | |
| 2nd place, silver medalist(s) | 4 | Brazil | Gabriel Santos (48.30); Marcelo Chierighini (46.85); César Cielo (48.01); Bruno Fratus (47.18) | 3:10.34 | SA |
| 3rd place, bronze medalist(s) | 2 | Hungary | Dominik Kozma (48.26 NR); Nándor Németh (48.04); Péter Holoda (48.48); Richárd Bohus (47.21) | 3:11.99 | NR |
| 4 | 7 | Russia | Danila Izotov (48.98); Vladimir Morozov (47.52); Nikita Lobintsev (48.09); Nikita Korolev (47.99) | 3:12.58 | |
| 5 | 1 | Japan | Katsumi Nakamura (48.60); Shinri Shioura (48.11); Katsuhiro Matsumoto (48.31); Junya Koga (48.63) | 3:13.65 | NR |
| 6 | 8 | Canada | Yuri Kisil (48.66); Markus Thormeyer (48.51); Javier Acevedo (49.03); Carson Olafson (49.05) | 3:15.25 | |
| | 5 | Australia | Jack Cartwright (48.34); Zac Incerti (48.28); Cameron McEvoy (48.04); Alexander Graham | DSQ | |
| | 6 | Italy | Luca Dotto (48.64); Ivano Vendrame; Alessandro Miressi; Filippo Magnini | DSQ | |
