= Swimming at the 2019 Pan American Games – Mixed 4 × 100 metre freestyle relay =

Mixed 4 × 100 metre freestyle relay at the 2019 Pan American Games
- Venue: Villa Deportiva Nacional, VIDENA
- Dates: August 7 (preliminaries and finals)
- Competitors: 58 from 9 nations
- Winning time: 3:24.84

Medalists
Gold medal	Michael Chadwick; Nathan Adrian; Claire Rasmus; Margo Geer; Andrew Abruzzo; Charles Swanson; Madison Kennedy; Ali DeLoof	United States
Silver medal	Breno Correia; Marcelo Chierighini; Larissa Oliveira; Etiene Medeiros; João de Lucca; Pedro Spajari; Lorrane Ferreira; Camila Mello	Brazil
Bronze medal	Daniel Ramírez; Jorge Iga; Monika González-Hermosillo; María Mata; Tayde Revilak; Marie Condé; José Martínez Gómez	Mexico

The mixed 4 × 100 metre freestyle relay competition of the swimming events at the 2019 Pan American Games were held on August 7, 2019 at the Villa Deportiva Nacional Videna cluster.

== Records ==
Prior to this competition, the existing World Record was as follows:

World record	United States (USA); Caeleb Dressel (47.34); Zach Apple (47.34); Mallory Comerford (52.72); Simone Manuel (52.00)	3:19.40	Gwangju, South Korea	July 27, 2019

The following games record was established during the competition:

Date	Event	Swimmer	Time	Record
August 7	Heat 1	United States (USA); Andrew Abruzzo (51.70); Charles Swanson (50.85); Madison Kennedy (55.72); Ali DeLoof (55.25)	3:33.52	GR
August 7	Heat 2	Brazil (BRA); João de Lucca (49.33); Pedro Spajari (48.84); Lorrane Ferreira (57.18); Camila Mello (56.97)	3:32.32	GR
August 7	Final	United States (USA); Michael Chadwick (49.09); Nathan Adrian (47.56); Claire Rasmus (55.10); Margo Geer (53.09)	3:24.84	GR

== Results ==
KEY:	Q	Qualified	GR	Games record	NR	National record	PB	Personal best	SB	Seasonal best

=== Heats ===
The first round was held on August 7.

Rank	Heat	Lane	Nation	Swimmers	Time	Notes
1	2	4	Brazil	João de Lucca (49.33); Pedro Spajari (48.84); Lorrane Ferreira (57.18); Camila Mello (56.97)	3:32.32	Q, GR
2	1	3	United States	Andrew Abruzzo (51.70); Charles Swanson (50.85); Madison Kennedy (55.72); Ali DeLoof (55.25)	3:33.52	Q, GR
3	2	2	Canada	Javier Acevedo (52.99); James Dergousoff (51.94); Kyla Leibel (55.60); Alexia Zevnik (55.74)	3:36.27	Q
4	1	5	Mexico	Daniel Ramírez (49.45); Tayde Revilak (58.01); Marie Condé (59.00); José Martínez Gómez (51.22)	3:37.68	Q
5	1	4	Argentina	Lautaro Rodríguez (51.23); Guido Buscaglia (49.99); Macarena Ceballos (57.52); Andrea Berrino (1:00.83)	3:39.57	Q
6	2	6	Peru	Sebastián Arispe (52.12); Jessica Cattaneo (59.69); Ricardo Espinosa (51.56); McKenna DeBever (56.39)	3:39.76	Q
7	2	3	Bahamas	Jared Fitzgerald (51.23); Gershwin Greene (52.42); Ariel Weech (59.61); Margaret Higgs (58.60)	3:41.86	Q, NR
8	2	5	Venezuela	Antoine Khazne (51.91); Andy Arteta (53.30); Fabiana Pesce (59.17); Simone Palomo (59.25)	3:43.63	Q
9	1	6	Panama	Isaac Beitia (51.89); Catharine Cooper (1:00.66); Ireyra Tamayo (1:02.90); Hernán Gonzalez (59.66)	3:55.11	

=== Final ===
The final round was also held on August 7.

Rank	Lane	Nation	Swimmers	Time	Notes
1st place, gold medalist(s)	5	United States	Michael Chadwick (49.09); Nathan Adrian (47.56); Claire Rasmus (55.10); Margo Geer (53.09)	3:24.84	GR
2nd place, silver medalist(s)	4	Brazil	Breno Correia (48.81); Marcelo Chierighini (47.61); Larissa Oliveira (54.72); Etiene Medeiros (54.83)	3:25.97	
3rd place, bronze medalist(s)	6	Mexico	Daniel Ramírez (49.64); Jorge Iga (48.76); Monika González-Hermosillo (56.19); María Mata (56.77)	3:31.36	NR
4	8	Venezuela	Cristian Quintero (49.00); Alberto Mestre Vivas (49.38); Jeserik Pinto (57.27); Andrea Santander (58.57)	3:34.22	
5	2	Argentina	Guido Buscaglia (50.17); Federico Grabich (49.27); Delfina Pignatiello (58.15); Andrea Berrino (57.28)	3:34.87	
6	3	Canada	Alyson Ackman (55.67); James Dergousoff (52.57); Alexia Zevnik (54.54); Javier Acevedo (52.41)	3:35.19	
7	1	Bahamas	Jared Fitzgerald (50.97); Gershwin Greene (52.42); Ariel Weech (59.58); Lillian Higgs (59.62)	3:42.59	
8	7	Peru	Ricardo Espinosa (52.52); Silvana Cabrera (1:01.89); Javier Tang Juy (52.55); Azra Avdic (59.66)	3:46.62	
