= Andressa =

Andressa may refer to:

- Andressa Alves
- Andressinha
- Andressa Fidelis
- Andressa de Morais
- Andressa Urach
- Andressa Jardim
- Kaká (footballer, born 1999)
- Andressa Picussa
- Andressa Fernandes
- Andressa Alves (rugby union)
- Andressa Cholodovskis
- Andressa Pereira
- Andressa Cintra
