= 2021 FINA World Swimming Championships (25 m) – Mixed 4 × 50 metre freestyle relay =

Swimming competition

Mixed 4 × 50 metre freestyle relay at the 2021 FINA World Swimming Championships (25 m)
- Venue: Etihad Arena
- Location: Abu Dhabi, United Arab Emirates
- Dates: 17 December (heats and final)
- Competitors: 143 from 33 nations
- Teams: 33
- Winning time: 1:28.55

Medalists
gold medal	Joshua Liendo; Yuri Kisil; Kayla Sanchez; Maggie Mac Neil; Rebecca Smith; Katerine Savard	Canada
silver medal	Jesse Puts; Thom de Boer; Ranomi Kromowidjojo; Kira Toussaint; Kenzo Simons	Netherlands
bronze medal	Vladimir Morozov; Andrey Minakov; Maria Kameneva; Arina Surkova; Daniil Markov; Rozaliya Nasretdinova

The Mixed 4 × 50 metre freestyle relay competition of the 2021 FINA World Swimming Championships (25 m) was held on 17 December 2021.

== Records ==
Prior to the competition, the existing world and championship records were as follows.

World record	United States (USA)	1:27.89	Hangzhou, China	12 December 2018
Competition record	United States (USA)	1:27.89	Hangzhou, China	12 December 2018

== Results ==
=== Heats ===
The heats were started at 10:58.

Rank	Heat	Lane	Nation	Swimmers	Time	Notes
1	4	4	Russian Swimming Federation	Andrey Minakov (21.04); Daniil Markov (21.30); Arina Surkova (23.50); Rozaliya Nasretdinova (24.00)	1:29.84	Q
2	4	5	Italy	Marco Orsi (21.70); Leonardo Deplano (20.91); Silvia Di Pietro (23.78); Costanza Cocconcelli (24.05)	1:30.44	Q
3	2	4	Netherlands	Jesse Puts (21.49); Kenzo Simons (21.20); Kira Toussaint (23.89); Ranomi Kromowidjojo (23.92)	1:30.50	Q
4	3	5	United States	Zach Apple (21.76); Hunter Tapp (21.73); Kate Douglass (23.59); Torri Huske (24.23)	1:31.31	Q
5	1	4	Hong Kong	Ng Cheuk Yin (22.26); Ian Ho (21.01); Siobhán Haughey (23.69); Tam Hoi Lam (24.37)	1:31.33	Q, NR
6	3	4	France	Maxime Grousset (21.48); Thomas Piron (21.69); Béryl Gastaldello (24.03); Analia Pigrée (24.30)	1:31.50	Q
7	3	2	Canada	Joshua Liendo (21.00); Yuri Kisil (21.22); Rebecca Smith (25.01); Katerine Savard (24.40)	1:31.63	Q
8	4	1	Switzerland	Thomas Hallock (22.14); Roman Mityukov (21.94); Nina Kost (24.67); Alexandra Touretski (24.38)	1:33.13	Q, NR
9	2	5	Turkey	Emre Sakçı (21.47); Baturalp Ünlü (21.73); Ekaterina Avramova (25.06); Selen Özbilen (25.89)	1:34.15	
10	4	3	Slovakia	Matej Duša (21.75); Ádám Halás (22.32); Lillian Slušná (25.58); Tamara Potocká (25.14)	1:34.79	NR
11	4	9	Luxembourg	Julien Henx (22.45); Max Mannes (22.43); Julie Meynen (25.15); Monique Olivier (25.57)	1:35.60	NR
12	3	1	Bahamas	Lamar Taylor (22.10); Izaak Bastian (22.27); Lillian Higgs (26.03); Joanna Evans (26.03)	1:36.43	
13	1	6	Thailand	Supha Sangaworawong (22.91); Tonnam Kanteemool (22.91); Kornkarnjana Sapianchai (25.98); Jenjira Srisaard (24.78)	1:36.58	NR
14	2	7	Jamaica	Sidrell Williams (23.39); Alia Atkinson (25.04); Keanan Dols (23.61); Zaneta Alvaranga (25.78)	1:37.82	
15	3	6	Dominican Republic	Josué Domínguez (22.92); Krystal Lara (25.85); Elizabeth Jiménez (26.89); Denzel González (22.96)	1:38.62	
16	3	8	Aruba	Elisabeth Timmer (25.77); Bransly Dirksz (24.98); Chloe Farro (26.47); Mikel Schreuders (21.64)	1:38.86	
17	2	6	Andorra	Tomàs Lomero (23.10); Patrick Pelegrina (23.27); Mònica Ramírez (26.72); Nàdia Tudó (26.81)	1:39.90	NR
18	3	9	Antigua and Barbuda	Stefano Mitchell (22.69 NR); Jadon Wuilliez (22.15); Samantha Roberts (26.77); Bianca Mitchell (28.30)	1:39.91	
19	3	3	Armenia	Artur Barseghyan (22.32); Vladimir Mamikonyan (23.17); Varsenik Manucharyan (27.13); Ani Poghosyan (27.38)	1:40.00	
20	2	9	Cayman Islands	Richard Allison (23.75); Liam Henry (24.16); Lauren Hew (26.24); Alison Jackson (25.93)	1:40.08	
21	1	7	Senegal	Steven Aimable (23.02); Adama Niane (22.89); Jeanne Boutbien (27.49); Oumy Diop (26.80)	1:40.20	
22	2	3	Albania	Kledi Kadiu (23.20); Nikol Merizaj (25.68); Katie Rock (28.10); Dalvi Elezi (23.72)	1:40.70	
23	4	7	Uganda	Tendo Mukalazi (23.78); Jesse Ssengonzi (23.44); Avice Meya (28.50); Kirabo Namutebi (25.82)	1:41.54	
24	2	0	Saint Lucia	Jayhan Odlum-Smith (23.10); Naima Hazell (27.29); Terrel Monplaisir (24.45); Mikaili Charlemagne (26.77)	1:41.61	
25	1	3	Faroe Islands	Bartal Erlingsson Eidesgaard (23.86); Johan Nónskarð Dam (25.14); Elisabeth Erlendsdóttir (26.62); Alisa Bech Vestergård (27.03)	1:42.65	
26	3	0	Mongolia	Batbayaryn Enkhtamir (24.36); Batmönkhiin Jürmed (24.83); Batbayaryn Enkhkhüslen (26.58); Khuyagbaataryn Enkhzul (27.16)	1:42.93	
27	1	1	Seychelles	Mathieu Bachmann (23.85); Aaliyah Palestrini (27.50); Khema Elizabeth (28.34); Simon Bachmann (23.83)	1:43.52	
28	2	1	Mauritius	Gregory Anodin (23.57); Jonathan Chung Yee (25.81); Kimberley Kok (27.42); Tessa Ip Hen Cheung (26.95)	1:43.75	
29	1	0	Angola	Salvador Gordo (24.45); Lia Lima (28.99); Catarina Sousa (27.06); Henrique Mascarenhas (23.43)	1:43.93	
30	1	9	Malawi	Filipe Gomes (23.67); Muhammad Moosa (28.42); Jessica Makwenda (28.94); Ammara Pinto (28.21)	1:49.24	
31	4	2	Northern Mariana Islands	Jinnosuke Suzuki (25.06); Juhn Tenorio (23.81); Asaka Litulumar (30.08); Shoko Litulumar (31.14)	1:50.09	
32	1	8	Guam	Mineri Gomez (29.90); Mark Imazu (25.97); Keana Santos (29.58); Israel Poppe (24.66)	1:50.11	
33	2	2	Maldives	Mohamed Aan Hussain (25.07); Aishath Sausan (29.80); Hamna Ahmed (30.28); Ali Imaan (25.61)	1:50.76	NR
	1	2	Turks and Caicos Islands		DNS	
	1	5	Peru		DNS	
	2	8	Bosnia and Herzegovina		DNS	
	3	7	Nigeria		DNS	
	4	0	Singapore		DNS	
	4	6	Tanzania		DNS	
	4	8	Cape Verde		DNS	

=== Final ===
The final was held at 19:49.

Rank	Lane	Nation	Swimmers	Time	Notes
1st place, gold medalist(s)	1	Canada	Joshua Liendo (20.94); Yuri Kisil (20.99); Kayla Sanchez (23.51); Maggie Mac Neil (23.11)	1:28.55	NR
2nd place, silver medalist(s)	3	Netherlands	Jesse Puts (21.33); Thom de Boer (20.35); Ranomi Kromowidjojo (22.97); Kira Toussaint (23.96)	1:28.61	
3rd place, bronze medalist(s)	4	Russian Swimming Federation	Vladimir Morozov (21.17); Andrey Minakov (20.95); Maria Kameneva (23.17); Arina Surkova (23.68)	1:28.97	
4	6	United States	Ryan Held (20.86); Zach Apple (21.31); Kate Douglass (23.70); Abbey Weitzeil (23.17)	1:29.04	
5	5	Italy	Lorenzo Zazzeri (21.13); Alessandro Miressi (21.18); Silvia Di Pietro (23.53); Costanza Cocconcelli (24.18)	1:30.02	
6	7	France	Maxime Grousset (21.17); Thomas Piron (21.43); Marie Wattel (23.88); Béryl Gastaldello (23.58)	1:30.06	
7	2	Hong Kong	Ng Cheuk Yin (22.29); Ian Ho (20.61); Siobhán Haughey (23.42); Tam Hoi Lam (24.11)	1:30.43	NR
8	8	Switzerland	Roman Mityukov (22.13); Thomas Hallock (21.37); Maria Ugolkova (24.13); Alexandra Touretski (24.33)	1:31.96	NR
