= Marcelo Chierighini =

Brazilian swimmer (born 1991)

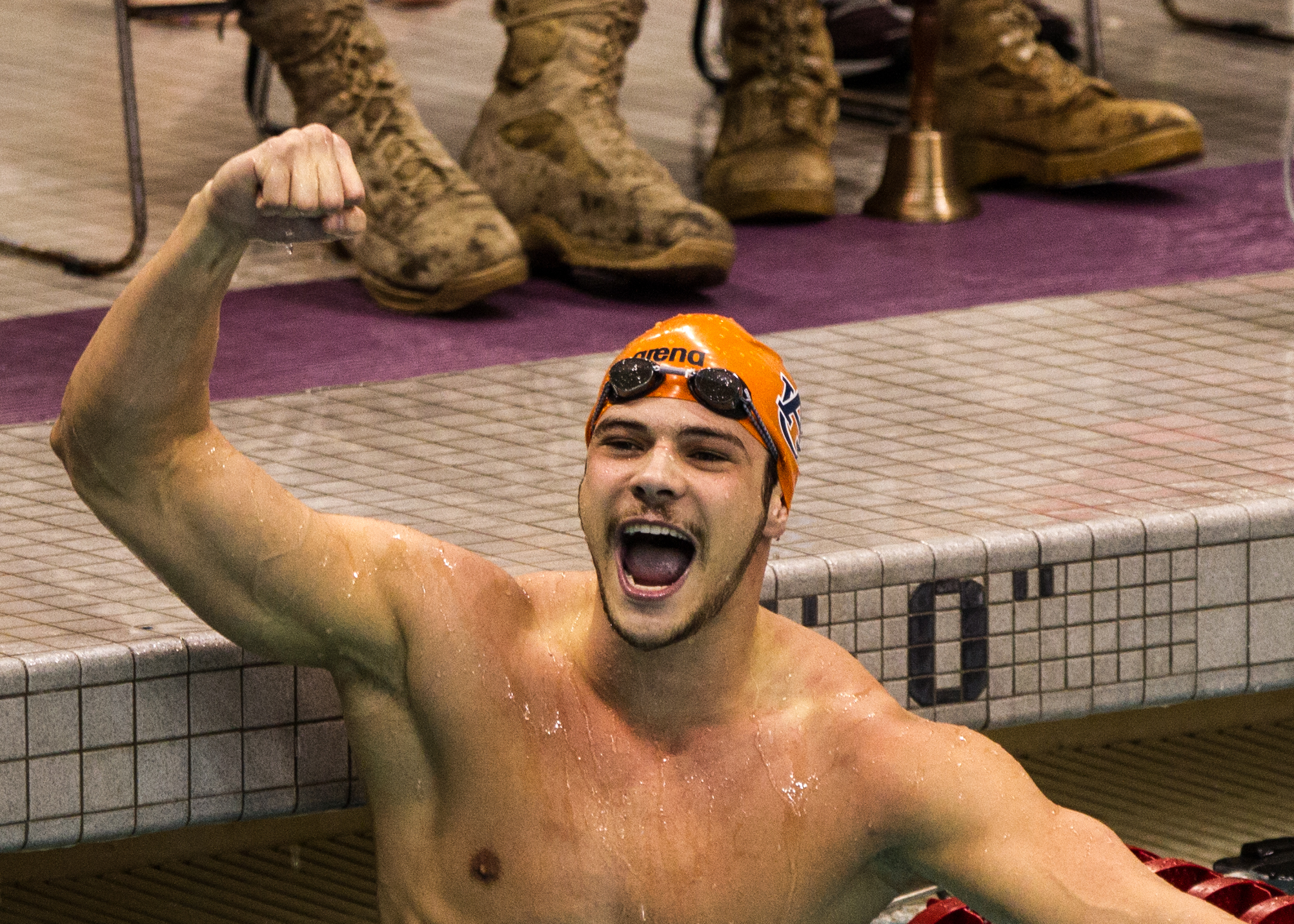
- Chierighini in 2013

Personal information
- Nickname: Lelo
- National team: Brazil
- Born: 15 January 1991 (age 35) Itu, São Paulo, Brazil
- Height: 1.91 m (6 ft 3 in)
- Weight: 88 kg (194 lb)

Sport
- Sport: Swimming
- Strokes: Freestyle
- Club: Esporte Clube Pinheiros
- College team: Auburn University (U.S.)
Medal record
Men's swimming
Representing Brazil
World Championships (LC)
Silver medal – second place	2017 Budapest	4×100 m freestyle
World Championships (SC)
Bronze medal – third place	2010 Dubai	4×100 m freestyle
Bronze medal – third place	2018 Hangzhou	4×100 m freestyle
Pan Pacific Championships
Gold medal – first place	2018 Tokyo	4×100 m freestyle
Bronze medal – third place	2014 Gold Coast	4×100 m freestyle
Pan American Games
Gold medal – first place	2015 Toronto	4×100 m freestyle
Gold medal – first place	2015 Toronto	4×100 m medley
Gold medal – first place	2019 Lima	100 m freestyle
Gold medal – first place	2019 Lima	4×100 m freestyle
Gold medal – first place	2023 Santiago	4×100 m freestyle
Gold medal – first place	2023 Santiago	4×100 m mixed free
Silver medal – second place	2019 Lima	4×100 m medley
Silver medal – second place	2019 Lima	4×100 m mixed freestyle
Bronze medal – third place	2015 Toronto	100 m freestyle
Universiade
Silver medal – second place	2011 Shenzhen	4×100 m freestyle

Marcelo Chierighini (born 15 January 1991) is a Brazilian competitive swimmer. In the 100 metre freestyle, he was an Olympic finalist at the Rio 2016 Games, and four times in a row a finalist at the World Championships in 2013, 2015, 2017 and 2019. In the 4 x 100 metre freestyle relay, he holds a silver medal at the 2017 World Championships.

== International career ==
=== 2010–12 ===
At the 2010 FINA World Swimming Championships (25 m) in Dubai, Chierighini, along with César Cielo, Nicholas Santos and Nicolas Oliveira, won the bronze medal in the 4×100-metre freestyle relay with a time of 3:05.74, a South American record, beating the U.S. team.

At the 2011 World Aquatics Championships in Shanghai, China, where he finished 9th in the 4×100-metre freestyle. At the 2011 Summer Universiade, he got a silver medal in the 4×100-metre freestyle relay.

=== 2012 Summer Olympics ===
Chierighini swam at the 2012 Summer Olympics in the 4×100-metre medley relay, in which he ranked 15th, and the 4×100-metre freestyle relay, in which he ranked 9th.

=== 2013–16 ===
In April 2013, at the Maria Lenk Trophy in Brazil, Chierighini swam the seventh-best time of the year in the 50-metre freestyle (21.88 seconds) and fourth-best in the 100-metre freestyle (48.11 seconds). At the 2013 World Aquatics Championships in Barcelona, he finished 7th in the 4×100-metre freestyle, along with Fernando Santos, Nicolas Oliveira and Vinícius Waked. In the 100-metre freestyle, he equalled his personal best in the semifinal, with a time of 48.11 seconds, ranking third for the final, behind Adrian (47.95) and Feigen (48.07). He finished 6th in the final, with a time of 48.28. In the 50-meter freestyle, Cherighini reached the semifinals, where he beat his personal record with a time of 21.84 seconds. However, due to the high level of competition (thirteen swimmers swam times below 22.0 seconds, better than London 2012 when ten swimmers did it), he finished 10th, missing out on the final by ten-hundredths of a second. In the 4×100-metre medley, he finished 12th, along with Leonardo de Deus, Felipe Lima and Nicholas Santos.

At the 2014 Pan Pacific Swimming Championships in Gold Coast, Queensland, Australia, Chierighini won a bronze medal in the Brazilian 4×100-metre freestyle relay, along with João de Lucca, Bruno Fratus and Nicolas Oliveira. He also finished 4th in the 4x100-metre medley relay, along with Guilherme Guido, Felipe França and Thiago Pereira, 8th in the 50-metre freestyle, and 9th in the 100-metre freestyle.

At the 2015 Pan American Games in Toronto, Ontario, Canada, Chierighini won the gold medal in the 4×100-metre medley relay (breaking the Pan American Games record with a time of 3:32.68, along with Guilherme Guido, Felipe França Silva and Arthur Mendes). and in the 4×100-metre freestyle relay (where the team broke the Pan American Games record with a time of 3:13.66, he swam with Matheus Santana, João de Lucca and Bruno Fratus). He also won a bronze medal in the 100-metre freestyle.

At the 2015 World Aquatics Championships in Kazan, Chierighini finished 4th in the Men's 4 × 100 metre freestyle relay, along with Matheus Santana, Bruno Fratus and João de Lucca. César Cielo didn't swim the final - despite participating in the championship, he was feeling shoulder pain on this day. In the Men's 100 metre freestyle, Chierighini achieved his best individual result at the World Championships, finishing in 5th place, with a time of 48.27. He also finished 10th in the Men's 4 × 100 metre medley relay.

=== 2016 Summer Olympics ===
At the 2016 Summer Olympics, he went to three finals: in the Men's 100 metre freestyle, finishing 8th; in the Men's 4 × 100 metre freestyle relay, finishing 5th; and in the Men's 4 × 100 metre medley relay, finishing 6th.

=== 2017–20 ===
At the 2017 World Aquatics Championships in Budapest, in the Men's 4 × 100 metre freestyle relay, the Brazilian team composed by Chierighini, César Cielo, Bruno Fratus and Gabriel Santos achieved a historic result by winning the silver medal, the best Brazilian result of all time at World Championships in this event. Brazil beat the South American record set in 2009, in the super-suits era, with a time of 3:10.34, just 0.28 behind the US team. The last World Championship medal Brazil won in this race was won in 1994. Chierighini did the fastest split of the entire field (46.85), and the third-fastest split ever in a textile jammer. He also finished 5th in the Men's 100 metre freestyle final, equalling his best time (48.11), and 5th In the Men's 4 × 100 metre medley relay, along with Henrique Martins, João Gomes Júnior and Guilherme Guido.

At the 2018 Pan Pacific Swimming Championships in Tokyo, Japan, Chierighini won the gold medal in the Men's 4 × 100 metre freestyle relay, along with Gabriel Santos, Marco Ferreira Júnior and Pedro Spajari. He also finished 4th in the Men's 100 metre freestyle and 8th in the Men's 50 metre freestyle.

At the 2018 FINA World Swimming Championships (25 m) in Hangzhou, China, Chierighini, along with César Cielo, Matheus Santana and Breno Correia, won the bronze medal in the Men's 4 × 100 metre freestyle relay, with a time of 3:05.15, setting a South American record. He also finished 12th in the Men's 100 metre freestyle.

On 18 April 2019, participating in the Maria Lenk Trophy competition in Rio de Janeiro, Chierighini finished the 100-metre freestyle race in 47.68 seconds, a new personal best, and third in the world rankings behind only Vladislav Grinev (47.43) and Kyle Chalmers (47.48). His time was the fastest by a South American in the textile suit era, breaking Cesar Cielo's previous record of 47.84, set back in 2011 at the Pan American Games.

At the 2019 World Aquatics Championships in Gwangju, South Korea, Chierighini came to try to win an unprecedented Men's 100 metre freestyle medal. He qualified 3rd at heats (47.95) and the semifinals (47.76). In the final, however, he failed to repeat the semifinal time, which would have won him the bronze medal: he finished the race in 5th place with a time of 47.93. Vladislav Grinev won the bronze with 47.82. In the Men's 4 × 100 metre freestyle relay and in the Men's 4 × 100 metre medley relay, he finished 6th, helping Brazil qualify for the Tokyo 2020 Olympics. He also finished 16th in the Men's 50 metre freestyle.

At the 2019 Pan American Games held in Lima, Peru, Chierighini won the gold medal in the Men's 100 metre freestyle, defeating Nathan Adrian, with a time of 48.09. He won another gold in the Men's 4 × 100 metre freestyle relay, breaking the Pan American Games record. Chierighini also won two silver medals in the Mixed 4 × 100 metre freestyle relay and Men's 4 × 100 metre medley relay.

=== 2020 Summer Olympics ===
At the 2020 Summer Olympics in Tokyo, Chierighini finished 8th in the Men's 4 × 100 metre freestyle relay and was disqualified in the Men's 4 × 100 metre medley relay.
