= Kenzo Simons =

Dutch swimmer (born 2001)

Personal information
- Nationality: Dutch
- Born: 13 April 2001 (age 25) Paramaribo, Suriname
- Height: 1.87 m (6 ft 2 in)

Sport
- Sport: Swimming
- Strokes: Freestyle
- Club: De Dolfijn
- Coach: Mark Faber
Medal record
Men's swimming
Representing Netherlands
World Championships (SC)
Silver medal – second place	2021 Abu Dhabi	4×50 m mixed freestyle
Bronze medal – third place	2021 Abu Dhabi	4×50 m freestyle
Bronze medal – third place	2022 Melbourne	4×50 m freestyle
Bronze medal – third place	2022 Melbourne	4×50 m mixed freestyle
European Championships (SC)
Gold medal – first place	2021 Kazan	4×50 m freestyle
Gold medal – first place	2021 Kazan	4×50 m mixed freestyle
Bronze medal – third place	2025 Lublin	4×50 m mixed freestyle

Kenzo Simons (born 13 April 2001) is a Dutch competitive swimmer of Surinamese descent who specializes in freestyle and butterfly. As a member of the Dutch relay team he won gold in the 4x50 m freestyle event during the 2021 European Short Course Championships, establishing a new national record.

== Personal bests ==
Short course
Event	Time	Date	Location
50 m freestyle	20.98	2019-12-22	Tilburg, Netherlands
100 m freestyle	47.23	2019-12-21	Tilburg, Netherlands
50 m butterfly	22.97	2021-07-04	Amsterdam, Netherlands
100 m butterfly	53.87	2020-12-17	Amsterdam, Netherlands

Long course
Event	Time	Date	Location
50 m freestyle	21.73	2024-02-16	Doha, Qatar
100 m freestyle	49.40	2023-03-08	Eindhoven, Netherlands
50 m butterfly	23.70	2023-04-15	Nice, France
100 m butterfly	1:01.39	2016-03-22	Le Lamentin, Martinique
