= Camila Mello =

Brazilian swimmer (born 2000)

Camila Lins de Mello
Personal information
- Full name: Camila Lins Mello
- Nationality: Brazil
- Born: July 12, 2000 (age 25) Belo Horizonte, Minas Gerais, Brazil
- Height: 1.84 cm (1 in)
- Weight: 71 kg (157 lb)

Sport
- Sport: Swimming
- Strokes: Freestyle
- Club: Minas TC
Medal record
Women's swimming
Representing Brazil
Pan American Games
Silver medal – second place	2019 Lima	4×100 m mixed freestyle
South American Games
Gold medal – first place	2018 Cochabamba	4×100 m freestyle
Gold medal – first place	2018 Cochabamba	4×200 m freestyle

Camila Lins de Mello (born July 12, 2000 in Belo Horizonte) is a Brazilian swimmer.

At the 2018 José Finkel Trophy, she broke the South American record in 4 × 200 m freestyle relay with a time of 7:50.57 along with Ana Carolina Vieira, Maria Paula Heitmann and Andressa Cholodovskis.

At the 2019 Pan American Games held in Lima, Peru, she won a silver medal in the mixed 4 × 100 metre freestyle relay, by participating at heats. She also finished 7th in the 200 metre individual medley.
