= Philipp Wolf =

German swimmer

Personal information
- Nationality: German
- Born: 15 August 1992 (age 33) Weiden, Bavaria, Germany

Sport
- Sport: Swimming

Philipp Wolf (born 15 August 1992) is a German swimmer. He competed in the men's 4 × 100 metre freestyle relay event at the 2016 Summer Olympics.
