= Pedro Spajari =

Brazilian swimmer (born 1997)

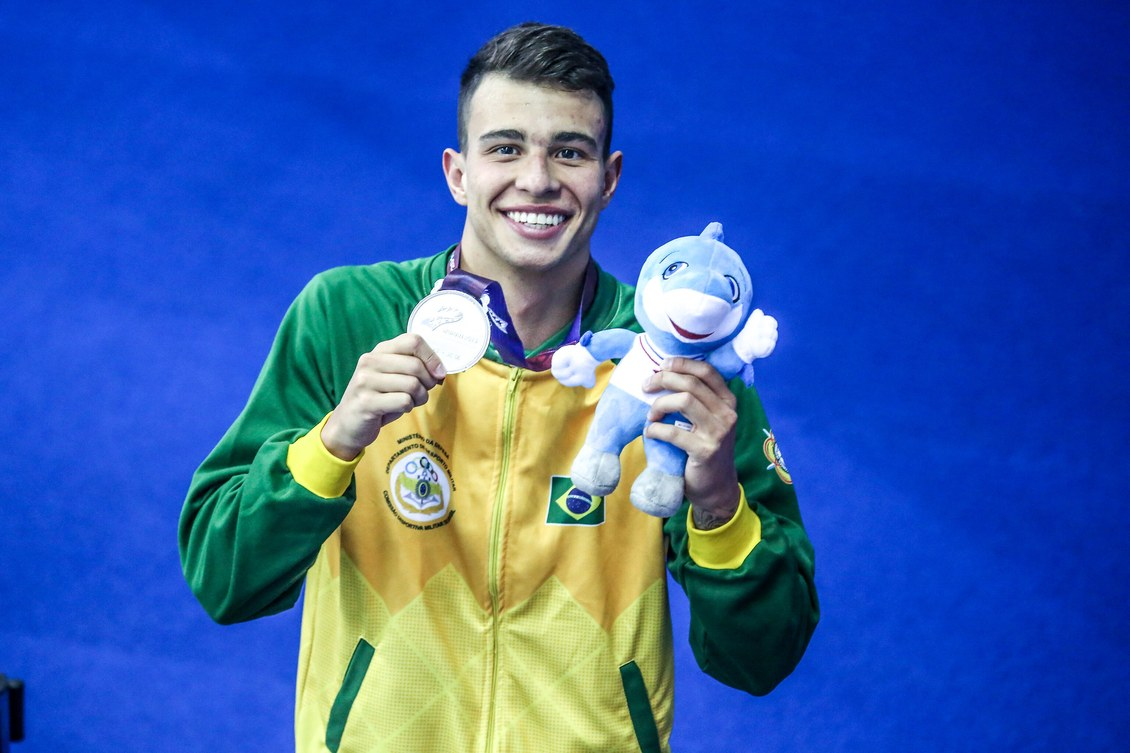
- Spajari in 2019

Personal information
- Full name: Pedro Henrique Silva Spajari
- Nationality: Brazil
- Born: February 18, 1997 (age 29) Amparo, São Paulo, Brazil
- Height: 1.86 m (6 ft 1 in)
- Weight: 82 kg (181 lb)

Sport
- Sport: Swimming
- Strokes: Freestyle
- Club: Pinheiros
Medal record
Men's swimming
Representing Brazil
Pan Pacific Championships
Gold medal – first place	2018 Tokyo	4×100 m freestyle
Pan American Games
Gold medal – first place	2019 Lima	4×100 m freestyle
Silver medal – second place	2019 Lima	4×100 m mixed freestyle
World University Games
Silver medal – second place	2021 Chengdu	4×100 m freestyle
Military World Games
Gold medal – first place	2019 Wuhan	4×100 m freestyle
Silver medal – second place	2019 Wuhan	50 m freestyle
Silver medal – second place	2019 Wuhan	100 m freestyle

Pedro Henrique Silva Spajari (born February 18, 1997, in Amparo) is a Brazilian swimmer.

== International career ==
=== 2015–2019 ===
At the 2015 FINA World Junior Swimming Championships held in Singapore, he finished 5th in the 100 metre freestyle., and 4th in the 4 × 100 m freestyle relay.

In 2016, Spajari discovered he has Klinefelter syndrome. As this condition reduces the body's testosterone level, and can impair attention and the immune system, it affected his athletic performance and ended his dream of defending the Brazilian team at the 2016 Summer Olympics in Rio de Janeiro. Upon diagnosis, he began medical treatment with androgen replacement therapy authorized by the sports authorities.

He was at the 2017 Summer Universiade, finishing 6th in the 100 metre freestyle, 5th in the 4 × 100 m medley relay, and 6th in the 4 × 100 m freestyle relay.

At the 2018 Pan Pacific Swimming Championships in Tokyo, Japan, Spajari won the gold medal in the Men's 4 × 100 metre freestyle relay, along with Gabriel Santos, Marco Ferreira Júnior and Marcelo Chierighini. He also finished 4th in the Men's 4 × 100 metre medley relay, 6th in the Men's 50 metre freestyle., and 7th in the Men's 100 metre freestyle.

At the 2019 World Aquatics Championships in Gwangju, South Korea, in the Men's 4 × 100 metre freestyle relay, he finished 6th, helping Brazil qualify for the Tokyo 2020 Olympics.

At the 2019 Pan American Games held in Lima, Peru, he won a gold medal in the Men's 4 × 100 metre freestyle relay, along with Breno Correia, Marcelo Chierighini and Bruno Fratus, with a time of 3:12.61, a new Pan American Games record. In the Mixed 4 × 100 metre freestyle relay, he won a silver medal, by participating at heats. He also finished 5th in the Men's 50 metre freestyle.

=== 2020 Summer Olympics ===
At the 2020 Summer Olympics in Tokyo, Spajari finished 8th in the Men's 4 × 100 metre freestyle relay and 25th in the Men's 100 metre freestyle.

=== 2021–2024 ===
At the 2022 FINA World Swimming Championships (25 m), in Melbourne, Australia, he finished 4th in the Men's 4 × 100 metre freestyle relay, 8th in the Men's 4 × 50 metre freestyle relay and in the Mixed 4 × 50 metre freestyle relay, 9th in the Men's 4 × 200 metre freestyle relay, 16th in the Men's 100 metre freestyle, and 42nd in the Men's 50 metre freestyle.
