= Swimming at the 2016 Summer Olympics – Men's 4 × 100 metre freestyle relay =

Men's 4 × 100 metre freestyle relay at the Games of the XXXI Olympiad
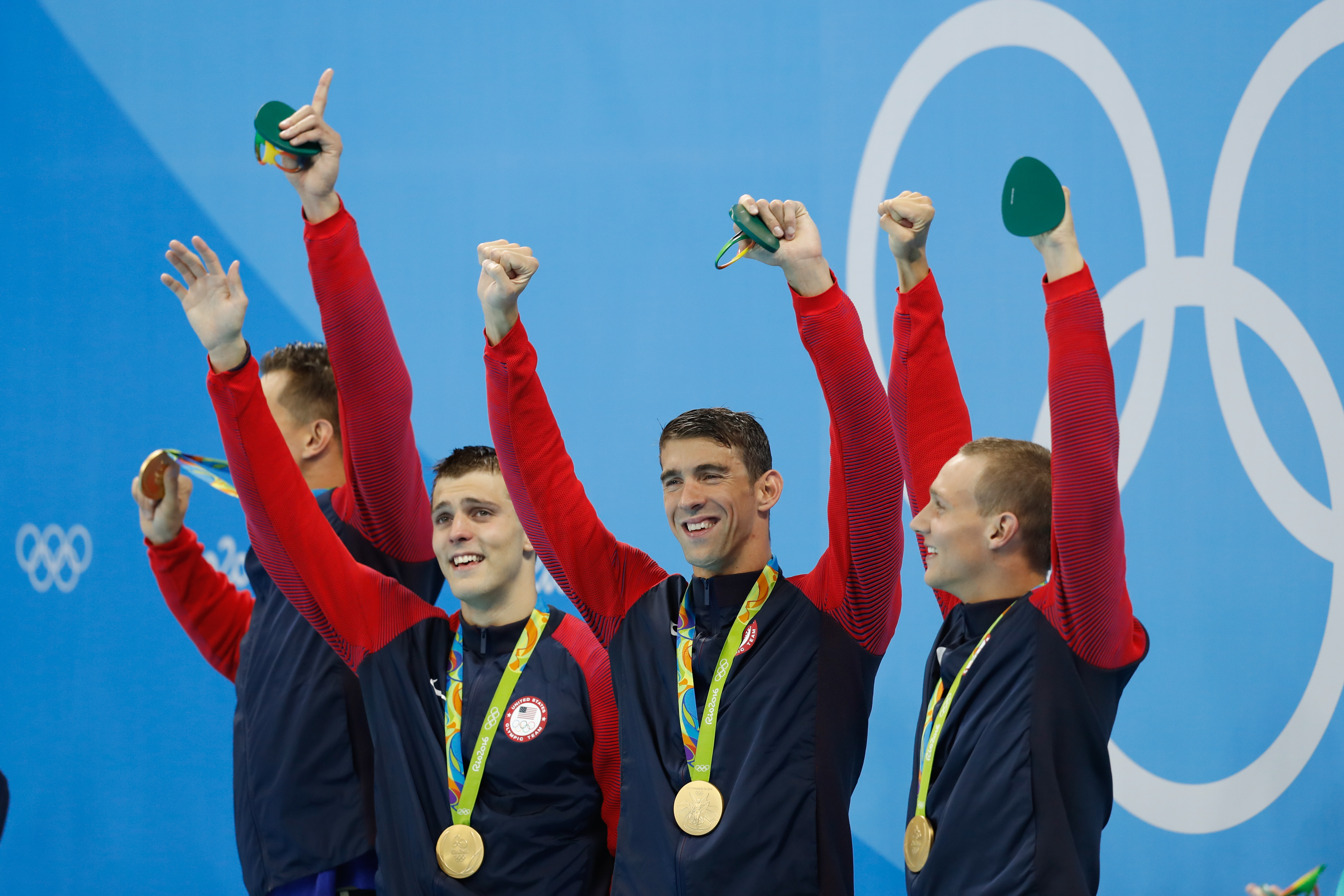
- The American final team (Adrian, Held, Phelps, and Dressel), celebrating their gold medal victory.
- Venue: Olympic Aquatics Stadium
- Dates: 7 August 2016 (heats & final)
- Competitors: 73 from 16 nations
- Teams: 16
- Winning time: 3:09.92

Medalists
1st place, gold medalist(s)		Caeleb Dressel, Michael Phelps, Ryan Held, Nathan Adrian, Jimmy Feigen*, Blake Pieroni*, Anthony Ervin*	United States
2nd place, silver medalist(s)		Mehdy Metella, Fabien Gilot, Florent Manaudou, Jérémy Stravius, William Meynard*, Clément Mignon*	France
3rd place, bronze medalist(s)		James Roberts, Kyle Chalmers, James Magnussen, Cameron McEvoy, Matthew Abood*; *Indicates the swimmer only competed in the preliminary heats.	Australia

The men's 4 × 100 metre freestyle relay event at the 2016 Summer Olympics took place on 7 August at the Olympic Aquatics Stadium.

== Summary ==
Four years after losing the Olympic gold to the Frenchmen in this event, the U.S. men's team was able to get back on top of the podium at these Games. Holding a tight race against the field on the lead-off leg by Caeleb Dressel (48.10), Michael Phelps threw down a 47.12 split on the second leg to move the Americans to the front, until he handed the youngster Ryan Held (47.73) and veteran Nathan Adrian their relay duties at the remaining exchanges of the race. Adrian delivered the fastest split in the field with an anchor of 46.97 to race against the Frenchmen towards a gold-medal finish in 3:09.92. Phelps had officially come out of retirement two years earlier to extend his career resume with a nineteenth gold medal and twenty-third overall at his fifth straight Olympics.

France's Mehdy Metella (48.08), Fabien Gilot (48.20), and Florent Manaudou (47.14) handed Jérémy Stravius the anchor duties to chase down the Americans to the front, but Stravius' split of 47.11 was just good enough to settle them only for the silver in 3:10.53. Meanwhile, the Australian combination of James Roberts (48.88), Kyle Chalmers (47.38), James Magnussen (48.11), and Cameron McEvoy (47.00) snatched the bronze in 3:11.37 to hold off the Russian quartet of Andrey Grechin (48.68), Danila Izotov (48.00), Vladimir Morozov (47.31), and Alexander Sukhorukov (47.65) by nearly three tenths of a second, a fourth-place time in 3:11.64.

Outside the podium, Brazil's Marcelo Chierighini (48.12), Nicolas Oliveira (48.26), Gabriel Santos (48.72), and João de Lucca (48.11) enjoyed racing in front of the home crowd to pick up the fifth spot with a 3:13.21. The Belgian foursome of Glenn Surgeloose (48.73), Jasper Aerents (48.47), Emmanuel Vanluchene (48.82), and Pieter Timmers (47.55) struggled to mount a challenge against the top-ranked teams throughout the race, but they managed to finish sixth with a national record of 3:13.57. Canada (3:14.35) and Japan (3:14.48) rounded out the championship field.

The medals for the competition were presented by Ivan Dibos, Peru, IOC member, and the gifts were presented by Mr. Errol Clarke, Bureau Member of the FINA.

== Records ==
Prior to this competition, the existing world and Olympic records were as follows.

World record	United States; Michael Phelps (47.51); Garrett Weber-Gale (47.02); Cullen Jones (47.65); Jason Lezak (46.06)	3:08.24	Beijing, China	11 August 2008
Olympic record	United States; Michael Phelps (47.51); Garrett Weber-Gale (47.02); Cullen Jones (47.65); Jason Lezak (46.06)	3:08.24	Beijing, China	11 August 2008

== Competition format ==
The competition consisted of two rounds: heats and a final. The relay teams with the best 8 times in the heats advanced to the final. Swim-offs were used as necessary to break ties for advancement to the next round.

== Results ==
=== Heats ===
A total of sixteen countries qualified to participate. The best eight from two heats advanced to the final.

Rank	Heat	Lane	Nation	Swimmers	Time	Notes
1	1	4	Russia	Andrey Grechin (48.58); Aleksandr Popkov (48.18); Danila Izotov (47.65); Alexander Sukhorukov (47.63)	3:12.04	Q
2	2	1	United States	Jimmy Feigen (48.55); Ryan Held (47.79); Blake Pieroni (48.39); Anthony Ervin (47.65)	3:12.38	Q
3	2	5	Australia	James Magnussen (48.85); Kyle Chalmers (47.04); James Roberts (48.33); Matthew Abood (48.43)	3:12.65	Q
4	2	4	France	Clément Mignon (48.59); William Meynard (49.05); Fabien Gilot (47.88); Mehdy Metella (47.75)	3:13.27	Q
5	2	3	Brazil	Marcelo Chierighini (48.47); Nicolas Oliveira (47.96); Gabriel Santos (48.63); Matheus Santana (49.00)	3:14.06	Q
5	1	6	Canada	Santo Condorelli (48.73); Yuri Kisil (47.70); Markus Thormeyer (48.29); Evan van Moerkerke (49.34)	3:14.06	Q
7	2	6	Belgium	Dieter Dekoninck (49.91); Jasper Aerents (48.77); Glenn Surgeloose (48.09); Pieter Timmers (47.39)	3:14.16	Q
8	1	2	Japan	Katsumi Nakamura (47.99) NR; Shinri Shioura (48.71); Kenji Kobase (48.79); Junya Koga (48.68)	3:14.17	Q, NR
9	1	5	Italy	Luca Dotto (48.51); Marco Orsi (48.58); Michele Santucci (48.42); Luca Leonardi (48.71)	3:14.22	
10	2	7	Greece	Odysseus Meladinis (49.92); Kristian Golomeev (47.43); Christos Katrantzis (49.13); Apostolos Christou (48.14)	3:14.62	
11	1	7	Germany	Steffen Deibler (48.92); Björn Hornikel (48.89); Philipp Wolf (48.46); Damian Wierling (48.70)	3:14.97	
12	1	3	Poland	Paweł Korzeniowski (49.93); Kacper Majchrzak (48.42); Jan Świtkowski (48.64); Konrad Czerniak (48.53)	3:15.52	
13	1	8	Spain	Markel Alberdi (49.28); Miguel Ortiz-Cañavate (48.87); Aitor Martínez (48.87); Bruno Ortiz-Cañavate (49.69)	3:16.71	NR
14	1	1	Romania	Marius Radu (49.33); Daniel Macovei (49.99); Alin Coste (49.51); Norbert Trandafir (48.20)	3:17.03	
	2	8	Hungary	Dominik Kozma (48.77); Richárd Bohus (48.60); Krisztián Takács (48.93); Péter Holoda (48.91)	~~3:15.21~~	DSQ
	2	7	China	He Jianbin (50.08); Lin Yongqing (DSQ); Ning Zetao (47.88); Yu Hexin (48.85)		DSQ

=== Final ===
Rank	Lane	Nation	Swimmers	Time	Notes
1st place, gold medalist(s)	5	United States	Caeleb Dressel (48.10); Michael Phelps (47.12); Ryan Held (47.73); Nathan Adrian (46.97)	3:09.92	
2nd place, silver medalist(s)	6	France	Mehdy Metella (48.08); Fabien Gilot (48.20); Florent Manaudou (47.14); Jérémy Stravius (47.11)	3:10.53	
3rd place, bronze medalist(s)	3	Australia	James Roberts (48.88); Kyle Chalmers (47.38); James Magnussen (48.11); Cameron McEvoy (47.00)	3:11.37	
4	4	Russia	Andrey Grechin (48.68); Danila Izotov (48.00); Vladimir Morozov (47.31); Alexander Sukhorukov (47.65)	3:11.64	
5	7	Brazil	Marcelo Chierighini (48.12); Nicolas Oliveira (48.26); Gabriel Santos (48.72); João de Lucca (48.11)	3:13.21	
6	1	Belgium	Glenn Surgeloose (48.73); Jasper Aerents (48.47); Emmanuel Vanluchene (48.82); Pieter Timmers (47.55)	3:13.57	NR
7	2	Canada	Santo Condorelli (48.51); Yuri Kisil (47.76); Markus Thormeyer (48.40); Evan van Moerkerke (49.68)	3:14.35	
8	8	Japan	Katsumi Nakamura (48.49); Shinri Shioura (48.65); Kenji Kobase (48.79); Junya Koga (48.55)	3:14.48	
