= Kenji Kobase =

Japanese swimmer

Personal information
- Nationality: Japanese
- Born: 31 July 1987 (age 38) Sapporo, Japan

Sport
- Sport: Swimming

Kenji Kobase (小長谷 研二, Kobase Kenji; born 31 July 1987) is a Japanese swimmer. He competed in the men's 4 × 100 metre freestyle relay event at the 2016 Summer Olympics.
