= Thom de Boer =

Dutch swimmer (born 1991)

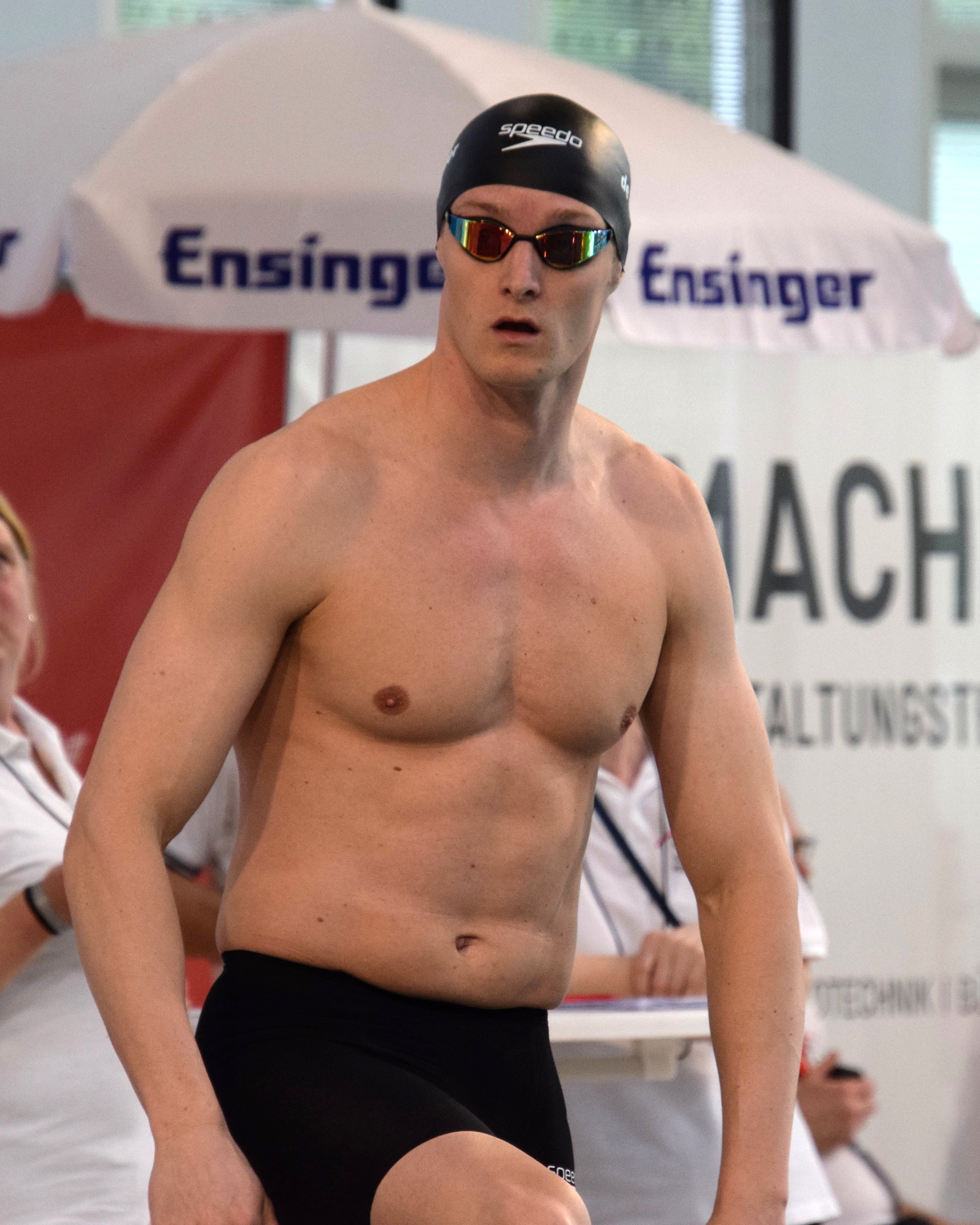

Personal information
- Nationality: Dutch
- Born: 24 December 1991 (age 34) Alkmaar
- Height: 1.96 m (6 ft 5 in)

Sport
- Sport: Swimming
Medal record
Men's swimming
Representing the Netherlands
World Championships (SC)
Gold medal – first place	2021 Abu Dhabi	4×50 m mixed medley
Silver medal – second place	2021 Abu Dhabi	4×50 m mixed freestyle
Bronze medal – third place	2021 Abu Dhabi	4×50 m freestyle
Bronze medal – third place	2022 Melbourne	4×50 m freestyle
Bronze medal – third place	2022 Melbourne	4×50 m mixed freestyle
European Championships (SC)
Gold medal – first place	2021 Kazan	4×50 m freestyle
Gold medal – first place	2021 Kazan	4×50 m mixed freestyle
Gold medal – first place	2021 Kazan	4×50 m mixed medley
Bronze medal – third place	2021 Kazan	4×50 m medley

Thom de Boer (born 24 December 1991) is an Olympic Dutch swimmer.

On 3 December 2020, he qualified himself at the Rotterdam Qualification Meet 2020 with a new Dutch record of 21.71 on the 50 metres freestyle for the 2020 Summer Olympics

== Personal bests ==
Short course
Event	Time	Date	Location
50 m freestyle	20.78NR	2022-07-02	Amsterdam, Netherlands
100 m freestyle	46.76	2021-07-04	Amsterdam, Netherlands
50 m butterfly	22.79	2021-11-05	Kazan, Russia

Long course
Event	Time	Date	Location
50 m freestyle	21.58NR	2021-07-03	Amsterdam, Netherlands
100 m freestyle	49.42	2020-12-05	Rotterdam, Netherlands
50 m butterfly	23.19	2021-07-03	Amsterdam, Netherlands
