= Akira Namba =

Japanese swimmer (born 1996)

Personal information
- Born: 23 April 1996 (age 29) Yokkaichi, Japan

Sport
- Country: Japan
- Sport: Swimming

Akira Namba (難波 暉, Nanba Akira; born 23 April 1996) is a Japanese swimmer. He competed in the men's 4 × 100 metre freestyle relay at the 2020 Summer Olympics.
