= Karol Ostrowski =

Polish swimmer (born 1999)

Personal information
- Nationality: Polish
- Born: 2 September 1999 (age 26)

Sport
- Sport: Swimming
- College team: Drury, Hawaii
Medal record
Men's swimming
Representing Poland
European Championships (SC)
| Silver medal – second place | 2019 Glasgow | 4×50 m freestyle |
World Junior Championships
| Silver medal – second place | 2017 Indianapolis | 4×100 m freestyle |
European Junior Championships
| Gold medal – first place | 2017 Netanya | 4×100 m freestyle |
| Bronze medal – third place | 2016 Hódmezővásárhely | 4×100 m freestyle |

Karol Ostrowski (born 2 September 1999) is a Polish swimmer. He competed in the men's 4 × 100 metre freestyle relay at the 2020 Summer Olympics.
