= Andressa Cholodovskis =

Brazilian swimmer (born 1997)

Personal information
- Full name: Andressa Cholodovskis Lima
- Nationality: Brazil
- Born: October 11, 1997 (age 28) Belo Horizonte, Minas Gerais, Brazil
- Height: 1.68 m (5 ft 6 in)

Sport
- Sport: Swimming
- Strokes: Medley
- Club: Minas TC
- College team: University of Nevada

Andressa Cholodovskis Lima (born October 11, 1997, in Belo Horizonte) is a Brazilian swimmer.

At the 2018 José Finkel Trophy, she broke the South American record in 4 × 200 m freestyle relay with a time of 7:50.57 along with Ana Carolina Vieira, Camila Mello and Maria Paula Heitmann.
