= James Roberts (swimmer) =

Australian swimmer (born 1991)

Personal information
- Full name: James Roberts
- Nickname: Rocket
- National team: Australia
- Born: 11 April 1991 (age 35) Tweed Heads, New South Wales
- Height: 1.94 m (6 ft 4 in)
- Weight: 90 kg (198 lb)

Sport
- Sport: Swimming
- Strokes: Freestyle
- Club: Somerset
- Coach: John Fowlie
Medal record
Men's swimming
Representing Australia
Olympic Games
| Bronze medal – third place | 2016 Rio de Janeiro | 4×100 m freestyle |
World Championships (LC)
| Gold medal – first place | 2011 Shanghai | 4×100 m freestyle |
| Silver medal – second place | 2011 Shanghai | 4×100 m medley |
Oceania Championships
| Gold medal – first place | 2010 Apia | 50 m freestyle |
| Gold medal – first place | 2010 Apia | 4×100 m freestyle |
| Silver medal – second place | 2010 Apia | 100 m freestyle |
| Silver medal – second place | 2010 Apia | 50 m butterfly |
Pan Pacific Championships
| Silver medal – second place | 2018 Tokyo | 4×100 m freestyle |
Commonwealth Games
| Gold medal – first place | 2018 Gold Coast | 4×100 m freestyle |

James Roberts (born 11 April 1991) is a retired Australian swimmer. He is a two-time medalist at the World Championships (one gold, one silver), and represented Australia at the 2012 Summer Olympics.

== Career ==
At the 2011 Australian Championships, Roberts qualified for the national team by placing second behind James Magnussen in the 100-metre freestyle in a time of 48.72 seconds. At the 2011 World Aquatics Championships, Roberts won a total of two medals, one gold and one silver. Roberts earned both of his medals by swimming in the heats of the 4×100-metre freestyle and medley relay. In the 100-meter freestyle, Roberts did not advance past the semifinals, and finished 10th overall with a time of 48.49.

At the 2012 Australian Championships, which also served as Australia's Olympic trials, Roberts qualified for the 2012 Summer Olympics by placing second in the 100-metre freestyle. In the 100-metre freestyle final, Roberts recorded a personal best of 47.63 seconds, finishing behind James Magnussen who won in 47.10. In the 50-meter freestyle final, Roberts placed 4th in 22.31.

In his first event at the 2012 Summer Olympics in London, the 4×100-metre freestyle relay, Roberts swam the anchor leg in a time of 48.09. The Australian team, although the favorites, failed to medal and placed fourth in the final with a time of 3:11.63. Roberts also swam in the heats of the 4×100-metre freestyle relay and recorded a time of 48.22 as the second leg. After recording a time of 48.93 in the heats of the 100-metre freestyle, Roberts failed to advance to the final, posting a time of 48.57 in the semifinals. As a result of illness, Roberts was left off the 4×100-metre medley relay in the heats.

At the 2016 Australian Championships, Roberts finished third in the 100-metre freestyle in a time of 48.32. This did not automatically qualify him for the 4×100-metre freestyle relay, as Australia had finished outside the top 12 at the 2015 World Championships. Because 4 additional berths were yet to be allocated to the fastest non-qualified nations from 1 March 2015 to 31 May 2016, Swimming Australia ensured qualification by organising a time trial. Australia posted a time of 3:12.26, with Roberts recording 48.63 on the first leg. This placed Australia first among the non-qualified nations, remaining so at the end of the qualifying period. Roberts was subsequently named to the Olympic team on 7 June 2016.

At the 2016 Olympic Games, Roberts competed in the 4×100-metre freestyle relay, splitting 48.88 on the first leg. Australia won the bronze medal in a time of 3:11.37.

In December 2021, Roberts announced his retirement from swimming at the age of 30.

== Personal bests ==
As of 19 March 2012.

| Event | Time | Venue | Date |
|---|---|---|---|
| 100 m freestyle (long course) | 47.63 | Adelaide | 19 March 2012 |
