= Alexander Graham (swimmer) =

Australian swimmer (born 1995)

Alex Graham
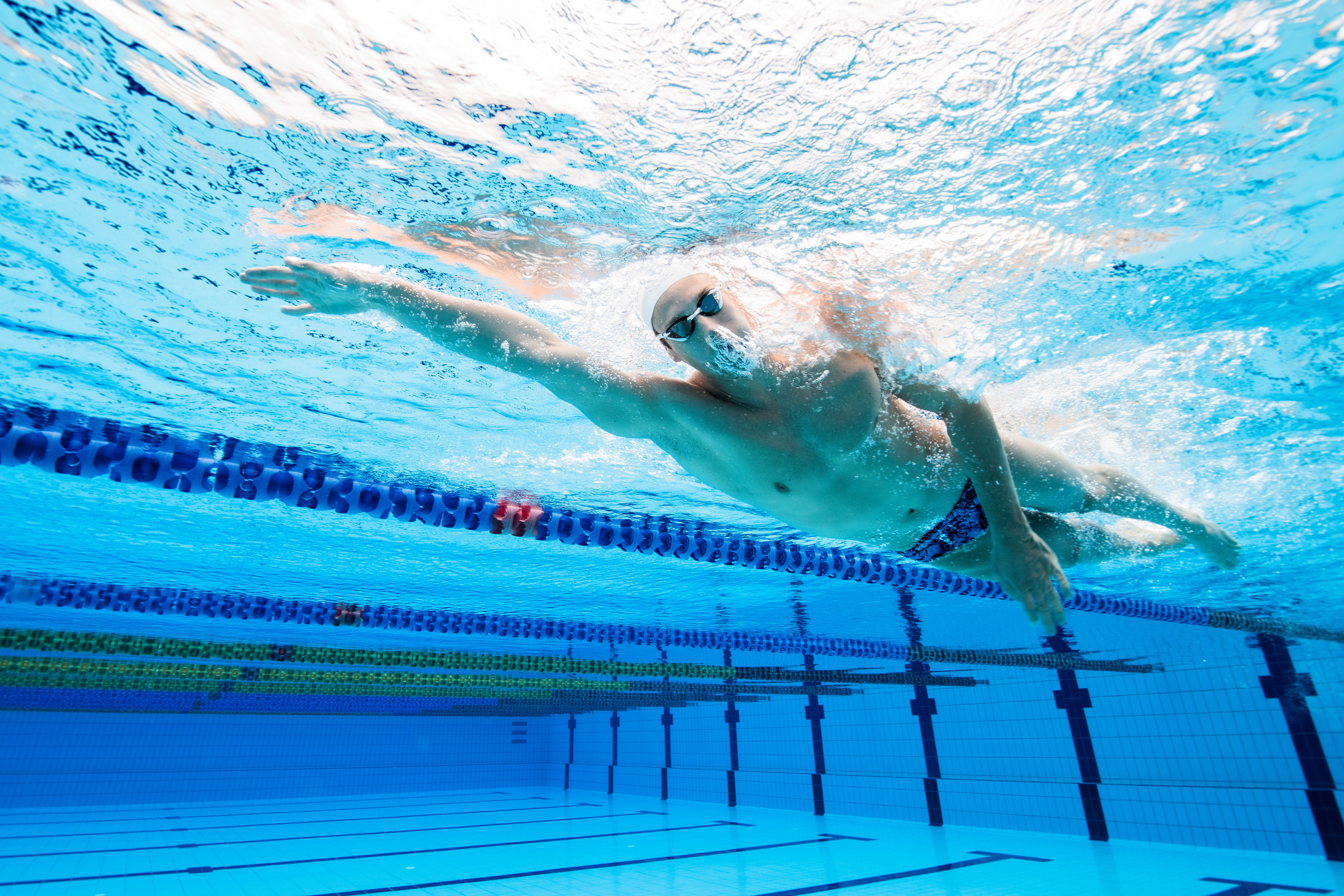
- Graham in 2021

Personal information
- Full name: Alexander Graham
- Born: 28 April 1995 (age 31) Auchenflower, Queensland, Australia
- Height: 1.95 m (6 ft 5 in)
- Weight: 92 kg (203 lb)

Sport
- Sport: Swimming
- Strokes: Freestyle
- Club: Miami SC
Medal record
Event	1st	2nd	3rd
Olympic Games	0	0	2
World Championships (LC)	1	1	2
World Championships (SC)	0	0	2
Commonwealth Games	1	0	0
Pan Pacific Swimming Championships	0	2	0
Total	2	3	6
Men's swimming
Representing Australia
Olympic Games
Bronze medal – third place	2020 Tokyo	4×100 m freestyle
Bronze medal – third place	2020 Tokyo	4×200 m freestyle
World Championships (LC)
Gold medal – first place	2019 Gwangju	4×200 m freestyle
Silver medal – second place	2019 Gwangju	4×100 m mixed freestyle
Bronze medal – third place	2019 Gwangju	4×100 m freestyle
Bronze medal – third place	2023 Fukuoka	4×200 m freestyle
World Championships (SC)
Bronze medal – third place	2016 Windsor	4×200 m freestyle
Bronze medal – third place	2018 Hangzhou	200 m freestyle
Pan Pacific Championships
Silver medal – second place	2018 Tokyo	4×100 m freestyle
Silver medal – second place	2018 Tokyo	4×200 m freestyle
Commonwealth Games
Gold medal – first place	2018 Gold Coast	4×200 m freestyle
Junior Pan Pacific Championships
Silver medal – second place	2012 Honolulu	100 m freestyle
Silver medal – second place	2012 Honolulu	4×100 m freestyle
Bronze medal – third place	2012 Honolulu	4×100 m medley

Alexander Graham (born 28 April 1995) is a retired Australian swimmer. He won 2 bronze medals at the 2020 Summer Olympics, and won a gold medal in the 4 × 200 m freestyle relay at the 2019 World Championships.

== Career ==
Graham made his Australian team debut at the 2013 World Championships in Barcelona, qualifying for the 4 × 200 m freestyle relay. There, Graham swam 1:49.10 on the third leg, with Australia finishing in ninth place to miss the final.

At the 2016 Short Course World Championships in Windsor, Ontario, Graham competed in the 4 × 200 m freestyle relay. Swimming the anchor leg, he split 1:43.30 and initially finished fourth. However, in 2022, the gold medalists were disqualified due to a doping violation from one of the relay swimmers, promoting Australia to the bronze medal position.

At the 2017 World Championships, Graham's first event was the 4 × 100 m freestyle relay. Graham swam the anchor leg, however an early relay exchange disqualified the team. In the 200 m freestyle, Graham finished thirty-fourth with a time of 1:48.67. He also competed in the 4 × 200 m freestyle relay, with the team finishing fourth overall.

At the 2018 Commonwealth Games on the Gold Coast, Graham recorded 1:47.01 to come sixth in the 200 m freestyle final. He swam the first leg of the 4 × 200 m freestyle relay, recording a time of 1:46.62. Australia won the gold medal in a games record time of 7:05.97.

Later in 2018, Graham competed at the Pan Pacific Championships in Tokyo. On day 1, he came fifth in the 200 m freestyle, posting a time of 1:46.50. The following day, he swam the 4 × 200 m freestyle relay. He split 1:45.91 on the third leg to extend Australia's lead, but the team was overtaken in the closing stages and finished with the silver medal. On day 3, Graham competed in the 4 × 100 m freestyle relay, splitting 48.50 on the second leg. Australia initially finished third, but were elevated to the silver medal position after the gold medalists were disqualified for failing to swim in their nominated order.

At the 2018 Short Course World Championships, Graham won the bronze medal in the 200 m freestyle.

At the 2019 World Championships in Gwangju, Graham competed in three relays. First was the 4 × 100 m freestyle relay, where he split 48.11 on the third leg. Australia won the bronze medal in a time of 3:11.22. In the 4 × 200 m freestyle relay, he swam the third leg in a time of 1:45.05 to give anchor swimmer Mack Horton the lead. Australia ultimately recorded 7:00.85 to win the gold medal. This was a new Australian record, breaking the previous mark of 7:01.65 from 2009. Graham later swam in the heats of the mixed 4 × 100 m freestyle relay, winning silver after Australia placed second in the final.

At the 2020 Olympics in Tokyo, Graham swam in the 4 × 100 m freestyle relay, swimming the third leg and winning the bronze medal overall. He won a second bronze medal by swimming the 4 × 200 m freestyle relay.

At the 2023 World Championships in Fukuoka, Graham won another world championship medal in the 4 × 200 m freestyle relay. He split 1:45.55 on the third leg, with Australia winning bronze overall.
