= Péter Holoda =

Hungarian swimmer (born 1996)

Personal information
- Nationality: Hungarian
- Born: 9 January 1996 (age 30) Debrecen, Hungary
- Height: 1.96 m (6 ft 5 in)
- Weight: 90 kg (198 lb)

Sport
- Sport: Swimming
- Club: Debreceni Úszóklub
Medal record
Representing Hungary
Men's swimming
World Championships (LC)
| Bronze medal – third place | 2017 Budapest | 4x100 m freestyle |
European Junior Championships (LC)
| Bronze medal – third place | 2014 Dordrecht | 100 m freestyle |
| Bronze medal – third place | 2014 Dordrecht | 50 m butterfly |
Men's finswimming
World Games
| Gold medal – first place | 2022 Birmingham | 100 m bi-fins |

Péter Holoda (born 9 January 1996) is a Hungarian swimmer. He competed in the men's 4 × 100 metre freestyle relay event at the 2016 Summer Olympics.
