= Gabriel Santos (swimmer) =

Brazilian swimmer (born 1996)

Personal information
- Full name: Gabriel da Silva Santos
- Born: 4 May 1996 (age 30) Guarulhos, Brazil

Sport
- Sport: Swimming
Medal record
Men's swimming
Representing Brazil
World Championships (LC)
Silver medal – second place	2017 Budapest	4×100 m freestyle
Pan Pacific Championships
Gold medal – first place	2018 Tokyo	4×100 m freestyle
South American Games
Gold medal – first place	2022 Asunción	50 m butterfly
Gold medal – first place	2022 Asunción	4x100 m freestyle
Gold medal – first place	2022 Asunción	4x100 mixed free
Bronze medal – third place	2022 Asunción	100 m freestyle

Gabriel da Silva Santos (born 4 May 1996) is a Brazilian swimmer. He competed in the men's 4 × 100 metre freestyle relay event at the 2016 Summer Olympics, finishing 5th.

== Biography ==
At the 2017 World Aquatics Championships in Budapest, in the Men's 4 × 100 metre freestyle relay, the Brazilian team composed of Santos, César Cielo, Bruno Fratus and Marcelo Chierighini achieved a historic result by winning the silver medal, the best Brazilian result of all time at the World Championships in this race. Brazil beat the South American record of 2009, still in the super-suits era, with a time of 3:10.34, just 0.28 from the US team. The last medal of Brazil in this race, in Worlds, was obtained in 1994. He also finished 14th in the Men's 100 metre freestyle.

At the 2018 Pan Pacific Swimming Championships in Tokyo, Japan, he won the gold medal in the Men's 4 × 100 metre freestyle relay, along with Marcelo Chierighini, Marco Ferreira Júnior and Pedro Spajari. He also finished 12th in the Men's 100 metre freestyle and 12th in the Men's 50 metre freestyle.

In February 2020, the Court of Arbitration for Sport (CAS) issued a final judgement that Santos had committed an anti-doping rule violation for unintentional use of clostebol as a consequence of "cross-contamination through the sharing of bathroom towels ... with a family member who had been using Clostebol under medical prescription". He had been earlier issued with a 12-month suspension by FINA, but this was overturned by the CAS ruling. Nevertheless, it was reported that Santos was still indefinitely banned from competing in the International Swimming League due their policy of barring swimmers who have ever received even a provisional suspension.

In June 2021, he qualified to represent Brazil at the 2020 Summer Olympics.
