= 2018 Pan Pacific Swimming Championships =

International swimming competition

- Host city: Tokyo, Japan
- Date: 9–14 August
- Venue(s): Tokyo Tatsumi International Swimming Center & Hojyo Beach
- Nations: 17
- Events: 37

The 2018 Pan Pacific Swimming Championships, a long course (50 m) event, was held in Tokyo, Japan, from 9 to 14 August 2018.

== Qualifying criteria ==
Unlike the World Championships and Olympic Games, nations can enter as many people as they like in the preliminaries of each event (in most international meets, only two swimmers from each nation are permitted). However, only two swimmers per nation can qualify for the semi-finals and finals. Prior to FINA's creation of semi-finals in the late 1990s, a total of 3 swimmers per country could qualify for the final and consolation heats of an event, with no more than 2 swimmers per country in a final or consolation.

For relays, each country may enter up to one team in each relay event to swim in the final heat and count toward the team score. Countries may also enter a “B” relay that will swim in a preceding heat. These “B” relays may not score points and are not eligible for medals. An NOC may enter up to 1 swimmer per sex (2 total), if they have no swimmers meeting any qualifying B standard.

== Participating nations ==
- Argentina
- Australia
- Brazil
- Canada
- China
- Cook Islands
- Colombia
- Ecuador
- Guam
- Japan
- New Zealand
- Northern Mariana Islands
- Oman
- Palau
- Peru
- Philippines
- United States

== Results ==
=== Men's events ===
Event	Gold		Silver		Bronze	
50 m freestyle	Michael Andrew; United States	21.46	Caeleb Dressel; United States	21.93	Yuri Kisil; Canada	22.02
100 m freestyle	Kyle Chalmers; Australia	48.00	Jack Cartwright; Australia Caeleb Dressel; United States	48.22	Not awarded	
200 m freestyle	Townley Haas; United States	1:45.56	Andrew Seliskar; United States	1:45.74	Katsuhiro Matsumoto; Japan	1:45.92
400 m freestyle	Jack McLoughlin; Australia	3:44.20	Mack Horton; Australia	3:44.31	Zane Grothe; United States	3:45.37
800 m freestyle	Zane Grothe; United States	7:43.74; CR	Jordan Wilimovsky; United States	7:45.19	Jack McLoughlin; Australia	7:47.31
1500 m freestyle	Jordan Wilimovsky; United States	14:46.93	Zane Grothe; United States	14:48.40	Jack McLoughlin; Australia	14:55.92
100 m backstroke	Ryan Murphy; United States	51.94; CR	Ryosuke Irie; Japan	52.78	Mitch Larkin; Australia	52.88
200 m backstroke	Ryan Murphy; United States	1:53.57; CR	Ryosuke Irie; Japan	1:55.12	Austin Katz; United States	1:56.00
100 m breaststroke	Yasuhiro Koseki; Japan	59.08	Jake Packard; Australia	59.20	João Gomes Júnior; Brazil	59.60
200 m breaststroke	Ippei Watanabe; Japan	2:07.75	Zac Stubblety-Cook; Australia	2:07.89	Matthew Wilson; Australia	2:08.22
100 m butterfly	Caeleb Dressel; United States	50.75; CR	Jack Conger; United States	51.32	Vinicius Lanza; Brazil	51.44
200 m butterfly	Daiya Seto; Japan	1:54.34	Leonardo de Deus; Brazil	1:54.89	Zach Harting; United States	1:55.05
200 m individual medley	Chase Kalisz; United States	1:55.40	Mitch Larkin; Australia	1:56.21; OC	Kosuke Hagino; Japan	1:56.66
400 m individual medley	Chase Kalisz; United States	4:07.95	Kosuke Hagino; Japan	4:11.13	Daiya Seto; Japan	4:12.60
4×100 m freestyle relay	Brazil; Gabriel Santos (48.93); Marcelo Chierighini (47.62); Marco Ferreira Júnior (48.53); Pedro Spajari (46.94)	3:12.02	Australia; Jack Cartwright (48.56); Alexander Graham (48.50); James Roberts (47.97); Kyle Chalmers (47.50)	3:12.53	Japan; Katsumi Nakamura (48.52); Shinri Shioura (48.19); Katsuhiro Matsumoto (47.61); Juran Mizohata (48.22)	3:12.54 AS
4×200 m freestyle relay	United States; Andrew Seliskar (1:46.75); Blake Pieroni (1:47.63); Zachary Apple (1:46.20); Townley Haas (1:43.78)	7:04.36	Australia; Clyde Lewis (1:46.54); Kyle Chalmers (1:46.73); Alexander Graham (1:45.91); Jack Cartwright (1:45.52)	7:04.70	Japan; Naito Ehara (1:47.28); Reo Sakata (1:47.07); Yuki Kobori (1:48.41); Katsuhiro Matsumoto (1:45.31)	7:08.07
4×100 m medley relay	United States; Ryan Murphy (52.70); Andrew Wilson (59.15); Caeleb Dressel (50.64); Nathan Adrian (47.71)	3:30.20	Japan; Ryosuke Irie (52.61); Yasuhiro Koseki (58.62); Yuki Kobori (51.19); Katsumi Nakamura (47.83)	3:30.25	Australia; Mitch Larkin (53.18); Jake Packard (59.03); Grant Irvine (51.40); Kyle Chalmers (46.91)	3:30.52
10 km open water	Jordan Wilimovsky; United States	1:58:50.5	Eric Hedlin; Canada	1:58:56.7	Nicholas Sloman; Australia	1:59:20.8

=== Women's events ===
Event	Gold		Silver		Bronze	
50 m freestyle	Cate Campbell; Australia	23.81; CR	Simone Manuel; United States	24.22	Emma McKeon; Australia	24.34
100 m freestyle	Cate Campbell; Australia	52.03; CR, OC	Simone Manuel; United States	52.66	Taylor Ruck; Canada	52.72
200 m freestyle	Taylor Ruck; Canada	1:54.44; CR, NR	Rikako Ikee; Japan	1:54.85; AS	Katie Ledecky; United States	1:55.15
400 m freestyle	Katie Ledecky; United States	3:58.50	Ariarne Titmus; Australia	3:59.66; OC	Leah Smith; United States	4:04.23
800 m freestyle	Katie Ledecky; United States	8:09.13; CR	Ariarne Titmus; Australia	8:17.07; OC	Leah Smith; United States	8:17.21
1500 m freestyle	Katie Ledecky; United States	15:38.97	Kiah Melverton; Australia	16:00.08	Leah Smith; United States	16:00.82
100 m backstroke	Kylie Masse; Canada	58.61	Emily Seebohm; Australia	58.72	Kathleen Baker; United States	58.83
200 m backstroke	Kathleen Baker; United States	2:06.14; CR	Taylor Ruck; Canada	2:06.41	Regan Smith; United States	2:06.46
100 m breaststroke	Lilly King; United States	1:05.44	Jessica Hansen; Australia	1:06.20	Reona Aoki; Japan	1:06.34
200 m breaststroke	Micah Sumrall; United States	2:21.88	Lilly King; United States	2:22.12	Satomi Suzuki; Japan	2:22.22
100 m butterfly	Rikako Ikee; Japan	56.08; CR, NR	Kelsi Dahlia; United States	56.44	Emma McKeon; Australia	56.54
200 m butterfly	Hali Flickinger; United States	2:07.35	Sachi Mochida; Japan	2:07.66	Katie Drabot; United States	2:08.40
200 m individual medley	Yui Ohashi; Japan	2:08.16; CR	Sydney Pickrem; Canada	2:09.07; NR	Miho Teramura; Japan	2:09.86
400 m individual medley	Yui Ohashi; Japan	4:33.77	Melanie Margalis; United States	4:35.60	Sakiko Shimizu; Japan	4:36.27
4×100 m freestyle relay	Australia; Emily Seebohm (54.56); Shayna Jack (53.10); Emma McKeon (52.56); Cate Campbell (51.36)	3:31.58; CR	United States; Mallory Comerford (53.48); Margo Geer (53.59); Kelsi Dahlia (53.59); Simone Manuel (52.79)	3:33.45	Canada; Taylor Ruck (52.85); Kayla Sanchez (53.11); Rebecca Smith (54.00); Alexia Zevnik (54.11)	3:34.07
4×200 m freestyle relay	Australia; Ariarne Titmus (1:55.27); Emma McKeon (1:55.66); Mikkayla Sheridan (1:56.72); Madeline Groves (1:56.47)	7:44.12; CR, OC	United States; Allison Schmitt (1:58.62); Leah Smith (1:56.44); Katie McLaughlin (1:55.47); Katie Ledecky (1:53.84)	7:44.37	Canada; Kayla Sanchez (1:58.37); Taylor Ruck (1:54.08); Rebecca Smith (1:58.08); Mackenzie Padington (1:56.75)	7:47.28
4×100 m medley relay	Australia; Emily Seebohm (59.28); Jessica Hansen (1:05.82); Emma McKeon (56.45); Cate Campbell (51.19)	3:52.74; CR	United States; Kathleen Baker (59.41); Lilly King (1:04.86); Kelsi Dahlia (56.72); Simone Manuel (52.22)	3:53.21	Japan; Natsumi Sakai (59.20); Reona Aoki (1:06.84); Rikako Ikee (55.48); Tomomi Aoki (53.51)	3:55.03; NR
10 km open water	Haley Anderson; United States	2:08:24.8	Kareena Lee; Australia	2:08:26.0	Ana Marcela Cunha; Brazil	2:08:27.0

=== Mixed events ===
Event	Gold		Silver		Bronze	
4 × 100 m mixed medley relay	Australia; Mitch Larkin (53.08); Jake Packard (58.68); Emma McKeon (56.22); Cate Campbell (50.93)	3:38.91; CR, OC	Japan; Ryosuke Irie (52.83); Yasuhiro Koseki (58.57); Rikako Ikee (55.53); Tomomi Aoki (54.05)	3:40.98; AS	United States; Kathleen Baker (59.29); Michael Andrew (59.21); Caeleb Dressel (50.50); Simone Manuel (52.74)	3:41.74

== Medal table ==
Host nation (Japan)

Rank	Nation	Gold	Silver	Bronze	Total
1	United States (USA)	20	14	11	45
2	Australia (AUS)	8	13	8	29
3	Japan (JPN)*	6	7	10	23
4	Canada (CAN)	2	3	4	9
5	Brazil (BRA)	1	1	3	5
Totals (5 entries)		37	38	36	111
