= Zach Apple =

American swimmer (born 1997)

Personal information
- Full name: Zachary Douglas Apple
- Nicknames: Zach, Zapple
- Born: April 23, 1997 (age 29) Trenton, Ohio, U.S.
- Height: 6 ft 7 in (201 cm)
- Weight: 218 lb (99 kg)
- Spouse: Susie Holmes (m. 2023)

Sport
- Country: United States
- Sport: Swimming
- Strokes: Freestyle
- Club: DC Trident; Indiana Swim Club
- College team: Auburn University; Indiana University
Medal record
Men's swimming
Representing the United States
Event	1st	2nd	3rd
Olympic Games	2	0	0
World Championships (LC)	3	1	1
World Championships (SC)	1	1	1
Pan Pacific Championships	1	0	0
Total	7	2	2
Olympic Games
Gold medal – first place	2020 Tokyo	4×100 m freestyle
Gold medal – first place	2020 Tokyo	4×100 m medley
World Championships (LC)
Gold medal – first place	2017 Budapest	4×100 m freestyle
Gold medal – first place	2019 Gwangju	4×100 m freestyle
Gold medal – first place	2019 Gwangju	4×100 m mixed freestyle
Silver medal – second place	2019 Gwangju	4×100 m medley
Bronze medal – third place	2019 Gwangju	4×200 m freestyle
World Championships (SC)
Gold medal – first place	2021 Abu Dhabi	4×50 m medley
Silver medal – second place	2021 Abu Dhabi	4×100 m medley
Bronze medal – third place	2021 Abu Dhabi	4×100 m freestyle
Pan Pacific Championships
Gold medal – first place	2018 Tokyo	4×200 m freestyle
World University Games
Gold medal – first place	2019 Naples	100 m freestyle
Gold medal – first place	2019 Naples	200 m freestyle
Gold medal – first place	2019 Naples	4×100 m freestyle
Gold medal – first place	2019 Naples	4×200 m freestyle
Gold medal – first place	2019 Naples	4×100 m medley

Zachary Douglas Apple (born April 23, 1997) is an American retired competitive swimmer who specialized in the sprint freestyle events. He used to swim for DC Trident in the International Swimming League. He won his first Olympic gold medal in the 4x100-meter freestyle relay at the 2020 Summer Olympics, swimming in the prelims and the final of the event, and later in the same Olympic Games won a gold medal and helped set a new world record and Olympic record in the 4x100-meter medley relay, swimming the freestyle leg of the relay in the final.

He competed at the 2019 World Aquatics Championships held in Gwangju, South Korea, winning four medals – two gold, one silver, and one bronze. He won a gold medal and set a new Championships record as part of the finals relay in the 4x100 meter freestyle relay. He was also a part of the finals relay team in the mixed 4x100-meter freestyle relay that won the gold medal in a world record time of 3 minutes, 19.40 seconds.

== Early life and education ==
Zach Apple was born April 23, 1997, in Trenton, Ohio, as the son of Doug and Allison Apple. Apple attended Edgewood High School and swam for GMVY Wahoos club team. In 2015, he was the YMCA Long Course National Champion in the 50m freestyle and runner-up for 200m freestyle. Apple swam collegiately at Auburn University from 2015 to 2018 and then transferred to Indiana University to finish his college career from 2018 to 2019.

== College career ==
As a freshman for the Auburn Tigers, Apple finished 19th in the 50-yard freestyle, 35th in the 100-yard and 20th in the 200-yard freestyle at the 2016 Men's NCAA Division I Championships. He also earned All-American honors as a member of the 200-yard freestyle relay that finished sixth.

In his sophomore year, Apple tied for fourth place in the 50-yard freestyle at the 2017 Men's NCAA Division I Championships. He also finished 12th and 14th in the 200 and 100-yard freestyle, and was a member of the 200-yard freestyle relay that finished sixth, 400-yard freestyle relay that finished 11th and 800-yard freestyle relay that finished 12th.

As a junior, Apple tied for 5th place in the 50-yard freestyle and was part of Auburn's 11th place in the 200-yard freestyle relay at the 2018 Men's NCAA Division I Championships. He also earned a third place in the 200-yard freestyle and finished tenth in the 100-yard freestyle.

In his final college season as a Hoosier, Apple finished fifth in the 50-yard freestyle, second in the 200 and third in the 100-yard freestyle. He also contributed to the team's second NCAA title in the 400-yard medley relay, 200 and 400-yard freestyle relays, which placed fourth.

== International career ==
=== 2017 World Championships ===
At the World Championships Trials in Indianapolis, Apple finished first in the prelims of the 100-yard freestyle and ended up fourth in the finals, which qualified him for the 400-meter freestyle relay. He swam in the prelims at the meet and won a gold medal after team USA finished first in the finals.

=== 2018 Pan Pacific Championships ===
Apple finished fourth in the 100 and fifth in the 50-meter freestyle at the 2018 National Swimming Championships, he qualified for the 2018 Pan Pacific Championships. At the meet, he finished second in the B-final in the 200-meter freestyle and fifth in the A-final in the 100-meter freestyle. He was also part of the 4x200-meter freestyle relay that won gold.

=== 2019 ===
==== 2019 World University Games ====
Zach Apple took home five gold medals: in the 100 and 200-meter freestyle as well as in the 4x100 and 4x200-meter freestyle, and 4x100 medley relay. He also finished sixth in the 50-meter freestyle.

==== 2019 World Championships ====
2019 World Championships
Gold medal – first place	4x100 m freestyle	3:09.06 (CR)
Gold medal – first place	4x100 m mixed freestyle	3:19.40 (WR)
Silver medal – second place	4x100 m medley	3:28.45
Bronze medal – third place	4x200 m freestyle	7:01.98

At the 2019 World Aquatics Championships held in July in Gwangju, South Korea, Apple won a total of four medals, two golds, one silver, and one bronze, all in relay events. In the final of the 4x100-meter freestyle relay, Apple swam alongside Caeleb Dressel, Blake Pieroni, and Nathan Adrian, helping the relay achieve a new Championships record and win the gold medal. Apple was the only swimmer on the relay to split under 47 seconds with his time of 46.86 seconds. This relay marked the first time since the 1970s that two Indiana University swimmers, Apple and Pieroni, had won a gold medal on the same relay team at a major championships meet.

Swimming with Caeleb Dressel, Mallory Comerford, and Simone Manuel in the final of mixed 4x100-meter freestyle relay, Apple won a gold medal and helped set a new world record of 3:19.40. Apple earned his silver medal of the meet in the 4x100 medley relay, swimming the freestyle leg of the relay in the prelims. He won his bronze medal in the 4x200-meter freestyle relay, where his swims in the prelims and finals garnered attention from SwimSwam who heralded Apple as the reason the relay team won the bronze medal instead of not medaling.

==== International Swimming League ====
Apple was a member of the inaugural International Swimming League swimming for the team DC Trident. He competed at the first two matches held in Indianapolis, Indiana, and Naples, Italy in October 2019, and the match held in College Park, Maryland in November 2019.

==== 2019 U.S. Open Championships ====
In December 2019, at the 2019 Toyota U.S. Open Championships held in Atlanta, Georgia, Apple placed second in the 50-meter freestyle with a time of 21.81 behind Bruno Fratus, second in the 200-meter freestyle with a time of 1:46.76 behind Townley Haas, and first in the 100-meter freestyle with a time of 47.69 that also set a new Championship record in the event for the meet.

=== 2021 ===
==== 2020 Olympic Trials ====
On June 17, 2021, Apple placed second in the 100-meter freestyle at the US Olympic Swimming Trials with a time of 47.72 and qualified for the 2020 US Olympic swimming team in the 4x100-meter freestyle relay and the individual 100-meter freestyle. Earlier in the meet, in the semifinals of the 200-meter freestyle on June 14, Apple swam a time of 1:46.22 in the 200-meter freestyle and ranked second overall, qualifying for the final. He finished fifth overall in the 200-meter freestyle final with a time of 1:46.45 and qualified for the 4x200-meter freestyle relay team at the 2020 Olympic Games on June 15.

On June 19, Apple ranked 12th in the 50-meter freestyle prelims with his time of 22.27 and advanced to the semifinals later the same day. In the semifinals, he swam a 22.50 and did not advance to the final, ranking 16th overall in the two semifinal heats.

==== 2020 Summer Olympics ====
2020 Summer Olympics
Gold medal – first place	4×100 m freestyle	3:08.97
Gold medal – first place	4×100 m medley relay	3:26.78 (WR)

NBC Sports: Apple anchors 4x100m medley relay

At his first Olympic Games, the 2020 Summer Olympics in Tokyo, Japan, Apple competed in the prelims and the final of the 4x100-meter freestyle relay. In the final of the event, Apple swam the fastest of any of his relay teammates, splitting a 46.69, which was over half a second faster than the next fastest relay swimmer Caeleb Dressel. Apple had the second fastest split time of any swimmer in the event's final, swimming a quarter of a second slower than the 46.44 split by Kyle Chalmers of Australia. The finals relay of Apple, Caeleb Dressel, Bowe Becker, and Blake Pieroni finished first in a time of 3:08.97, with Apple anchoring the relay. All relay teammates, including prelims-only swimmer Brooks Curry, won the gold medal for their efforts. Apple was the first athlete from the Auburn University swim program, past or present, to win a gold medal in swimming at an Olympic Games since the 2012 Summer Olympics.

On the fourth day of competition, Apple swam a 48.16 in the prelims of the 100-meter freestyle, ranked 11th overall, and qualified for the semifinals. The following day of competition, Apple was selected to swim in the finals of the 4x200-meter freestyle relay along with Kieran Smith, Drew Kibler, and Townley Haas. The relay finished fourth in the final, then later in the same competition session Apple placed sixth in his semifinal heat, 11th overall, and did not advance to the final of the 100-meter freestyle.

On the final day, Apple swam the freestyle leg of the 4x100-meter medley relay and won a gold medal and set the world record and Olympic record in the event at 3:26.78 along with his final relay teammates Ryan Murphy, Michael Andrew, and Caeleb Dressel. Apple swam a time of 46.95 for his 100-meter freestyle portion of the relay, which was the fastest split time in any stroke from any swimmer in the final by only one hundredth of a second as Kyle Chalmers split a 46.96 for the freestyle leg of the Australia relay.

Apple's performances on the 4x100-meter freestyle relay and the 4x100-meter medley relay, where the only other swimmer from any country in the final of either event to split faster than him was Kyle Chalmers of Australia in the 4x100-meter freestyle relay, garnered the affection of the USA Swimming Foundation who included him in their nomination of both relays for one Golden Goggle Award, the "Relay Performance of the Year" award, thus making two out of three relay nominations for the award include the only person to swim freestyle on both relays: Zach Apple.

==== International Swimming League ====
For the 2021 International Swimming League, Apple was selected as a member of the team DC Trident roster.

==== 2021 World Short Course Championships ====
2021 World Championships
Gold medal – first place	4×50 m medley	1:30.51
Silver medal – second place	4×100 m medley	3:20.50
Bronze medal – third place	4×100 m freestyle	3:05.42

Apple entered to compete in one individual event at the 2021 World Short Course Championships in Abu Dhabi, United Arab Emirates in December, the 100-meter freestyle. For the week of November 1, 2021, the only item ranking higher than the United States team announcement for the Championships, including Apple, for "The Week That Was" honor from Swimming World was Kyle Chalmers setting a new world record in the short course 100 meter freestyle.

On day one of the championships, Apple substituted in for Tom Shields for the finals relay in the 4×100 meter freestyle relay, and helped achieve a third-place finish with finals relay teammates Shaine Casas, Hunter Tapp, and Ryan Held, winning the bronze medal in the event. Apple led-off the 4×50 meter mixed freestyle relay in 21.76 seconds in the prelims heats the following day, contributing to the 1:31.31 that qualified the relay for the final ranked fourth. In the final, Apple split a 21.31 for the second leg of the relay, helping achieve a fourth-place finish. Day four of competition, Apple helped advance the 4×50 meter freestyle relay to the final ranked third, splitting a 21.62 for the lead-off leg of the relay. On the finals relay, Apple split a 21.06 to help achieve a fourth-place finish in 1:23.81 with finals relay teammates Ryan Held, Shaine Casas, and Kieran Smith. Day five of competition, Apple anchored the 4×50 meter medley relay in the prelims heats, helping qualify the relay for the final ranking fifth with a split of 21.27. He also qualified for the semifinals of the 100 meter freestyle in the morning, swimming a 47.05 and ranking tenth overall. In the final of the 4×50 meter medley relay Ryan Held substituted in for Apple, the finals relay tied for first, and Apple won a gold medal along with the rest of the prelims and finals relay team members. Apple placed twelfth in the semifinals of the 100 metre freestyle with a 47.33. The sixth and final day of the championships, Apple anchored the 4×100 meter medley relay with a 46.80 in the prelims heats and helped qualify the relay to the final ranking third. In the final, Ryan Held substituted in for Apple and the relay team won the silver medal with a time of 3:20.50.

=== 2022 ===
==== Pro Swim Series – San Antonio ====
On the second day of the Pro Swim Series at Northside Swim Center in San Antonio, Texas in March and April 2022, Apple qualified for the final of the 200 meter freestyle ranking seventh with a time of 1:51.56 in the prelims heats. He placed eighth in the final with a 1:51.43. For the prelims of the 50 meter freestyle on day three, he ranked 14th with a 22.96 and qualified for the b-final in the evening where he went on to place eighth, sixteenth overall, with a time of 22.97 seconds. In the prelims heats of the 100 meter freestyle on day four, he tied for eighth with a time of 49.85 seconds, then in the evening b-final he won with a time of 49.86 seconds.

==== 2022 International Team Trials ====
At the 2022 US International Team Trials in Greensboro, North Carolina, Apple ranked seventh in the prelims heats of the 100 meter freestyle on the first day of competition, qualifying for the evening final in 48.57 seconds. He placed eighth in the final with a time of 48.52 seconds. He followed up his swims with a 1:49.44 in the prelims heats of the 200 meter freestyle the following morning, placing 18th overall.

==== February 2023: Retirement ====
On February 23, Apple announced his retirement from competitive swimming.

== International championships ==
Meet	50 free	100 free	200 free	4×50 free	4×100 free	4×200 free	4×50 medley	4×100 medley	4×50 mixed freestyle	4×100 mixed freestyle
WC 2017				—N/a	(gold) ^{[a]}		—N/a		—N/a	
PAC 2018	2nd (b)	5th	2nd (b)	—N/a	DSQ	1st place, gold medalist(s)	—N/a		—N/a	—N/a
WUG 2019	6th	1st place, gold medalist(s)	1st place, gold medalist(s)	—N/a	1st place, gold medalist(s)	1st place, gold medalist(s)	—N/a	1st place, gold medalist(s)	—N/a	—N/a
WC 2019				—N/a	1st place, gold medalist(s)	3rd place, bronze medalist(s)	—N/a	(silver) ^{[a]}	—N/a	1st place, gold medalist(s)
OG 2020		11th		—N/a	1st place, gold medalist(s)	4th	—N/a	1st place, gold medalist(s)	—N/a	—N/a
SCW 2021		12th		4th	3rd place, bronze medalist(s)		(gold) ^{[a]}	(silver) ^{[a]}	4th	—N/a

^{a} Apple swam only in the prelims heats.

== Personal best times ==
=== Long course meters (50 m pool) ===
Event	Time	Meet	Location	Date	Ref
50 m freestyle	21.81	2019 U.S. Open Championships	Atlanta, Georgia	December 5, 2019	
100 m freestyle	47.69	2019 U.S. Open Championships	Atlanta, Georgia	December 6, 2019	
200 m freestyle	1:46.22	2020 US Olympic Trials	Omaha, Nebraska	June 14, 2021	

=== Short course meters (25 m pool) ===
Event	Time	Meet	Location	Date	Ref
50 m freestyle	21.10	2020 International Swimming League	Budapest, Hungary	October 26, 2020	
100 m freestyle	45.74	2020 International Swimming League	Budapest, Hungary	October 19, 2020	
200 m freestyle	1:42.94	2020 International Swimming League	Budapest, Hungary	October 19, 2020	

== Records ==
=== Long course meters ===
Event	Time	Meet	Date	Location	Type	Age	Ref
4x100 m freestyle relay^{[a]}	3:09:06	2019 World Championships	July 21, 2019	Gwangju, South Korea	CR	22	
4x100 m mixed freestyle relay^{[b]}	3:19.40	2019 World Championships	July 27, 2019	Gwangju, South Korea	WR, AM, NR, CR	22	
4x100 m medley relay^{[c]}	3:26.78	2020 Summer Olympics	August 1, 2021	Tokyo, Japan	WR, AM, NR, OR	24	

Legend: WR – World record; AM – Americas record; NR – American record; OR – Olympic record; CR – World Championships record

^{a} split 46.86 (3rd leg); with Caeleb Dressel (1st leg), Blake Pieroni (2nd leg), Nathan Adrian (4th leg)
^{b} split 47.34 (2nd leg); with Caeleb Dressel (1st leg), Mallory Comerford (3rd leg), Simone Manuel (4th leg)
^{c} split 46.95 in freestyle; with Ryan Murphy (backstroke), Michael Andrew (breaststroke), and Caeleb Dressel (butterfly)

== Awards and honors ==
- Golden Goggle Award, Relay Performance of the Year: 2021 (4x100 meter medley relay)
- Swimming World, The Week That Was: November 1, 2021 (#2)
- SwimSwam Top 100 (Men's): 2021 (#64), 2022 (#50)
- Golden Goggle Award nominee, Relay Performance of the Year: 2021 (4x100 meter freestyle relay)

== See also ==
- List of multiple Olympic gold medalists at a single Games
- World and Olympic records set at the 2020 Summer Olympics
- Chronological summary of the 2020 Summer Olympics
- World record progression 4 × 100 metres medley relay
- World record progression 4 × 100 metres freestyle relay (mixed)
- List of World Swimming Championships (25 m) medalists (men)

Records
Preceded by Aaron Peirsol, Eric Shanteau, Michael Phelps, David Walters	Men's 4×100-meter medley relay world record-holder August 1, 2021 – present With: Ryan Murphy, Michael Andrew, Caeleb Dressel	Succeeded by Incumbents
Preceded by Caeleb Dressel, Nathan Adrian, Mallory Comerford, Simone Manuel	Mixed 4×100-meter freestyle relay world record-holder July 27, 2019 – present With: Caeleb Dressel, Mallory Comerford, Simone Manuel	Succeeded by Incumbents
