= Yuri Kisil =

Canadian swimmer (born 1995)

Personal information
- Nickname: Kisil The Missile
- National team: Canada
- Born: September 18, 1995 (age 30) Calgary, Alberta, Canada
- Height: 2.00 m (6 ft 7 in)
- Weight: 90 kg (198 lb)

Sport
- Sport: Swimming
- Strokes: Freestyle
- Club: Toronto Titans (ISL 2020); London Roar (ISL 2019). High Performance Centre-Ontario, Whitby Dolphins, High Performance Centre-Vancouver, UBC Dolphins, Cascade Swim Club, University of Calgary Dinos.
- College team: UBC Thunderbirds
Medal record
Men's swimming
Representing Canada
World Championships (LC)
Bronze medal – third place	2015 Kazan	4×100 m mixed freestyle
Bronze medal – third place	2017 Budapest	4×100 m mixed freestyle
Bronze medal – third place	2017 Budapest	4×100 m mixed medley
World Championships (SC)
Gold medal – first place	2021 Abu Dhabi	4×50 m mixed freestyle
Silver medal – second place	2024 Budapest	4×50 m mixed freestyle
Bronze medal – third place	2016 Windsor	4×50 m mixed freestyle
Pan Pacific Championships
Bronze medal – third place	2018 Tokyo	50 m freestyle
Pan American Games
Silver medal – second place	2015 Toronto	4×100 m freestyle
Bronze medal – third place	2015 Toronto	4×200 m freestyle
Bronze medal – third place	2015 Toronto	4×100 m medley

Yuri Kisil (born September 18, 1995) is a Canadian competitive swimmer who is a freestyle sprinter. A six-time medallist at the World Aquatics Championships, Kisil has represented Canada at the 2016, 2020 Summer Olympics and 2024 Summer Olympics.

== Career ==
=== 2013–2016 ===
Kisil's selection to the World Junior Championships in Dubai was his first major junior international competition. At this event he became the Canadian 15–17 age group national record holder in the 50 m Freestyle. Kisil was the youngest swimmer in Canadian history to win both the 50 m and 100 m freestyle national championships at the Canadian Swimming Trials in Victoria, British Columbia, on April 3, 2014. He was also the youngest Canadian to ever swim under 50 seconds in the 100m freestyle at the same event. As a result, Kisil was named to Canada's 2014 Commonwealth Games team, where he placed fourth in the 100m Freestyle.

At the 2015 Pan American Games in Toronto, Kisil won three relay medals. He was named to compete at the 2015 World Aquatics Championships in Kazan, Russia, where he won a bronze medal in the inaugural 4 × 100 m mixed freestyle relay.

In 2016, Kisil was named to Canada's Olympic team for the 2016 Summer Olympics. He was part of the relay team that finished seventh in the 4 × 100 m freestyle final, and individually got to the 100 m freestyle semifinals, finishing tenth.

=== 2016–2021 ===
In April 2017, Kisil was named to Canada's team for the 2017 World Aquatics Championships in Budapest, Hungary. He finished tenth in the semi-finals of the 100 m freestyle, and won two bronze medals as part of Canada's relay teams in the 4 × 100 m mixed freestyle and 4 × 100 m mixed medley.

In September 2017, he was named to Canada's team for the 2018 Commonwealth Games. Kisil made the finals of both the 50 m and 100 m freestyle, finishing fifth and seventh. At the 2018 Pan Pacific Championships in Tokyo, Kisil captured bronze in the 50 m freestyle, his first major individual international medal. He said afterward "I've wanted to get on the podium individually for a long time. To finally do it here means the world.". Following this, he departed longtime coach Tom Johnson to train in Toronto with Ben Titley, after being disappointed with the times he had been recording in the 100 m.

2019 saw the launch of the International Swimming League, a professional competition circuit for swimmers. Kisil signed with the London Roar in the inaugural season. London Roar was one of the four team to reach the ISL's season finale in Las Vegas, where they finished in second place. In spring 2020, Kisil signed with the Toronto Titans, the first Canada-based team in the ISL. Competing at the 2019 World Aquatics Championships in Gwangju, he came seventeenth in the heats of the 100 m, just missing the semi-finals.

The onset of the COVID-19 pandemic resulted in the 2020 Summer Olympics being delayed by a year. In June 2021, Kisil was named to Canada's 2020 Olympic team. He was part of Canada's team in the 4 × 100 m freestyle relay, who unexpectedly finished in fourth place despite not even being initially favoured to make the event final.
