= Katsumi Nakamura =

Japanese swimmer (born 1994)

Personal information
- Nationality: Japanese
- Born: 21 February 1994 (age 32) Tokyo, Japan
- Height: 1.85 m (6 ft 1 in)
- Weight: 75 kg (165 lb)

Sport
- Sport: Swimming
- Club: Itoman Toshin
Medal record
World Championships (SC)
Bronze medal – third place	2018 Hangzhou	4×100 m medley
Pan Pacific Championships
Silver medal – second place	2018 Tokyo	4×100 m medley
Bronze medal – third place	2018 Tokyo	4×100 m freestyle
Asian Games
Gold medal – first place	2018 Jakarta	4×100 m freestyle
Silver medal – second place	2014 Incheon	4×100 m freestyle
Silver medal – second place	2018 Jakarta	50 m freestyle
Silver medal – second place	2018 Jakarta	100 m freestyle
Silver medal – second place	2018 Jakarta	4×100 m medley
Bronze medal – third place	2022 Hangzhou	4×100 m freestyle
Bronze medal – third place	2022 Hangzhou	4×100 m medley

Katsumi Nakamura (中村 克, Nakamura Katsumi; born 21 February 1994) is a Japanese swimmer. He competed in the men's 4 × 100 metre freestyle relay event at the 2016 Summer Olympics. He qualified to represent Japan at the 2020 Summer Olympics.

== Personal life ==
In 23 December 2024, Nakamura and actress Umika Kawashima, jointly announced that they have tied the knot.

== Filmography ==
=== Web shows ===
Year	Title	Role	Notes	Ref.
2025	Physical: Asia	Contestant	Netflix	
