= 2014 Junior Pan Pacific Swimming Championships =

- Host city: Maui, Hawaii, United States
- Date(s): 27–31 August
- Venue(s): Kihei Aquatic Center (pool); Ulua Beach (open water)
- Events: 36 total (34 pool; 2 open water)

The 2014 Junior Pan Pacific Swimming Championships were held from 27 to 31 August 2014 in Maui, Hawaii, United States. Pool competition was conducted in a long course (50 metre) pool at Kihei Aquatic Center in Kihei, Hawaii and the open water marathons were contested at Ulua Beach in Wailea, Hawaii.

Medalists were determined based on results in the A-final with finals conducted in an A-final and B-final format. This marked a change in nomenclature from the 2012 edition where the medalists were determined from the Championship final and the second final was termed the Consolation final.

== Results ==
=== Men ===
Event	Gold		Silver		Bronze	
50 m freestyle	Paul Powers; United States	22.20; CR	Blake Jones; Australia	22.67	Cameron Kidd; Canada	22.69
100 m freestyle	Paul Powers; United States	50.29	Blake Pieroni; United States	50.30	Markus Thormeyer; Canada	50.40
200 m freestyle	Townley Haas; United States	1:48.32; CR	Blake Pieroni; United States	1:48.85	Katsuhiro Matsumoto; Japan	1:49.90
400 m freestyle	Liam Egan; United States	3:52.59	Aidan Burns; United States	3:53.10	Josh Parrish; Australia	3:53.85
800 m freestyle	Townley Haas; United States	8:00.99	Liam Egan; United States	8:04.06	Peter Brothers; Canada	8:04.45
1500 m freestyle	Liam Egan; United States	15:15.53	Jon McKay; Canada	15:21.82	Sean Grieshop; United States	15:29.87
100 m backstroke	Connor Green; United States	55.08	Michael Andrew; United States	55.81	Markus Thormeyer; Canada	56.07
200 m backstroke	Connor Green; United States	1:59.60	Corey Okubo; United States	2:01.17	Markus Thormeyer; Canada	2:01.55
100 m breaststroke	Connor Hoppe; United States	1:01.68	Matthew Ackman; Canada Ryuya Mura; Japan	1:02.05	Not awarded	
200 m breaststroke	Ryuya Mura; Japan	2:13.55	Rintaro Okubo; Japan	2:13.75	Matthew Wilson; Australia	2:14.71
100 m butterfly	Alex Valente; United States	52.60	Andrew Seliskar; United States	53.14	Bradlee Ashby; New Zealand	53.81
200 m butterfly	Andrew Seliskar; United States	1:55.92; CR	Yuya Yajima; Japan	1:58.30	Corey Okubo; United States	1:59.23
200 m individual medley	Andrew Seliskar; United States	2:00.81	Curtis Ogren; United States	2:02.21	Juran Mizohata; Japan	2:02.31
400 m individual medley	Andrew Seliskar; United States	4:16.05	Curtis Ogren; United States	4:20.34	Bradlee Ashby; New Zealand	4:23.15
4×100 m freestyle relay	United States; Paul Powers (50.14); Blake Pieroni (49.45); James Jones (50.06); Townley Haas (49.03)	3:18.68	Australia; Vincent Dai (50.59); Brayden McCarthy (50.13); Benno Negri (50.34); Blake Jones (49.69)	3:20.75	Canada; Markus Thormeyer (51.89); Mitchell Ferraro (50.43); Matthew Ackman (50.38); Cameron Kidd (50.28)	3:22.98
4×200 m freestyle relay	United States; Townley Haas (1:48.29); Liam Egan (1:50.78); Blake Pieroni (1:50.24); Andrew Seliskar (1:52.05)	7:21.36	Japan; Katsuhiro Matsumoto; Koki Tanaka; Juran Mizohata (1:51.75); Fuyu Yoshida (1:50.04)	7:23.45	Australia; Jacob Hansford (1:51.05); Sam Young (1:51.26); Damian Fyfe (1:50.27); Josh Parrish (1:51.16)	7:23.74
4×100 m medley relay	United States; Connor Green (55.63); Connor Hoppe (1:01.07); Alex Valente (52.70); Townley Haas (49.69)	3:39.09	Japan; Juran Mizohata; Ryuya Mura; Yuya Yajima (53.10); Katsuhiro Matsumoto (49.30)	3:42.78	Canada; Markus Thormeyer (57.40); Matthew Ackman (1:01.75); Nicolaas Dekker (53.50); Cameron Kidd (3:43.12)	3:43.12
10 km open water	Brendan Casey; United States	1:58:00.0	Jon McKay; Canada	1:58:01.0	Lachlan Colquhoun; Australia	1:58:35.0

=== Women ===
Event	Gold		Silver		Bronze	
50 m freestyle	Amy Bilquist; United States	25.04	Zhu Menghui; China	25.12	Lucy McJannett; Australia	25.38
100 m freestyle	Shayna Jack; Australia	54.82	Chelsea Gillett; Australia	54.93	Zhu Menghui; China	55.14
200 m freestyle	Katie Drabot; United States	1:58.73	Shayna Jack; Australia	1:59.48		2:00.46
400 m freestyle	Courtney Harnish; United States	4:09.36	Tamsin Cook; Australia	4:10.91	Alex Aitchison; Canada	4:11.16
800 m freestyle	Sierra Schmidt; United States	8:34.71	Sacha Downing; Australia	8:37.04	Courtney Harnish; United States	8:40.67
1500 m freestyle	Sierra Schmidt; United States	16:26.81	Moesha Johnson; Australia	16:31.96	Isabel Rongione; United States	16:33.60
100 m backstroke	Amy Bilquist; United States	1:01.00	Danielle Hanus; Canada	1:01.51	Rio Shirai; Japan	1:01.82
200 m backstroke	Rio Shirai; Japan	2:11.67	Rika Yuhara; Japan	2:12.51	Dalin Lee; South Korea	2:13.24
100 m breaststroke	Lilly King; United States	1:07.98; CR	Jorie Caneta; United States	1:08.68	Runa Imai; Japan	1:09.25
200 m breaststroke	Runa Imai; Japan	2:26.04	Manami Chida; Japan	2:28.47	Emily Kopas; United States	2:28.83
100 m butterfly	Suzuka Hasegawa; Japan	58.91	Christina Licciardi; Australia	59.36	Rikako Ikee; Japan	59.50
200 m butterfly	Haruno Ito; Japan	2:09.02; CR	Cassidy Bayer; United States	2:09.08	Hannah Kukurugya; United States	2:09.68
200 m individual medley	Ella Eastin; United States	2:13.12	Mary-Sophie Harvey; Canada	2:13.77	Kim Williams; United States	2:14.18
400 m individual medley	Ella Eastin; United States	4:43.13	Hiroko Makino; Japan	4:45.23	Tianni Gilmour; Australia	4:45.95
4×100 m freestyle relay	Australia; Lucy McJannett (55.07); Shayna Jack (54.66); Sophie Taylor (55.67); Chelsea Gillett (54.33)	3:39.73; CR	United States; Stanzi Moseley (55.66); Amy Bilquist (55.00); Katie Drabot (54.46); Katrina Konopka (55.02)	3:40.14	Japan; Sachi Mochida (56.22); Rikako Ikee (55.50); Haruno Ito (57.35); Hiroko Makina (56.46)	3:45.33
4×200 m freestyle relay	United States; Katie Drabot (1:59.53); Courtney Harnish (1:59.94); Stanzi Moseley (2:00.35); Amy Bilquist (2:00.65)	8:00.47	Australia; Shayna Jack (2:00.33); Chelsea Gillett (2:00.46); Sophie Taylor (2:00.39); Tamsin Cook (2:00.08)	8:01.26	Japan; Sachi Mochida (2:02.06); Rikako Ikee (2:00.88); Chinatsu Sato (2:03.70); Hiroko Makino (2:02.62)	8:09.26
4×100 m medley relay	United States; Amy Bilquist (1:01.52); Lilly King (1:08.03); Hannah Kukurugya (59.13); Katie Drabot (54.76)	4:03.44; CR	Japan; Rio Shirai (1:02.37); Runa Imai (1:08.18); Suzuka Hasegawa (58.69); Rikako Ikee (54.87)	4:04.11	Canada; Danielle Hanus (1:02.20); Kelsey Wog (1:11.01); Jacomie Strydom (1:00.27); Mary-Sophie Harvey (55.09)	4:08.57
10 km open water	Yukimi Moriyama; Japan	2:00:00.0	Grace Hull; Australia	2:03:13.0	Regan Kology; United States	2:03:25.0

== Medal table ==
* Host nation (United States)

Rank	Nation	Gold	Silver	Bronze	Total
1	United States*	28	12	9	49
2	Japan	6	9	7	22
3	Australia	2	10	6	18
4	Canada	0	5	9	14
5	China	0	1	1	2
6	New Zealand	0	0	2	2
7	South Korea	0	0	1	1
Totals (7 entries)		36	37	35	108

== Championships records set ==
The following Championships records were set during the course of competition.

Day	Date	Event	Stage	Time	Name	Country
1	27 August	200 m butterfly (men)	Heats	1:56.65	Andrew Seliskar	United States
1	27 August	200 m freestyle (men)	Final	1:48.32	Townley Haas	United States
1	27 August	200 m butterfly (women)	Final	2:09.02	Haruno Ito	Japan
1	27 August	200 m butterfly (men)	Final	1:55.92	Andrew Seliskar	United States
2	28 August	100 m breaststroke (women)	Final	1:07.98	Lilly King	United States
3	29 August	4×100 m freestyle relay (women)	Final	3:39.73	Lucy McJannett (55.07); Shayna Jack (54.66); Sophie Taylor (55.67); Chelsea Gillett (54.33)	Australia
4	30 August	50 m freestyle (men)	Heats	22.24	Paul Powers	United States
4	30 August	50 m freestyle (men)	Final	22.20	Paul Powers	United States
4	30 August	4×100 m medley relay (women)	Final	4:03.44	Amy Bilquist (1:01.52); Lilly King (1:08.03); Hannah Kukurugya (59.13); Katie Drabot (54.76)	United States
