= Yukimi Moriyama =

Japanese swimmer (born 1996)

Personal information
- Nationality: Japanese
- Born: 9 August 1996 (age 29)

Sport
- Sport: Swimming
Medal record
Women's swimming
Representing Japan
Asian Games
Bronze medal – third place	2022 Hangzhou	1500m freestyle
Junior Pan Pacific Championships
Gold medal – first place	2014 Maui	10 km open water

Yukimi Moriyama (born 9 August 1996) is a Japanese swimmer. She competed in the women's 800 metre freestyle event at the 2018 FINA World Swimming Championships (25 m), in Hangzhou, China. In 2018, she also competed in the women's 800 metre freestyle and 1500 metre freestyle events at the 2018 Asian Games held in Jakarta, Indonesia.

At the 2014 Junior Pan Pacific Swimming Championships, as part of the open water swimming competition contested at Ulua Beach in Hawaii, United States, Moriyama won the gold medal in the 10 kilometre open water marathon with a time of 2:00:00.0, finishing over three full minutes ahead of the silver medalist from Australia.
