= 2018 Pan Pacific Swimming Championships – Men's 100 metre butterfly =

Men's 100 metre butterfly at the 2018 Pan Pacific Swimming Championships
- Venue: Tokyo Tatsumi International Swimming Center
- Dates: 11 August (heats & finals)
- Competitors: 27 from 10 nations
- Winning time: 50.75

Medalists
gold medal	Caeleb Dressel	United States
silver medal	Jack Conger	United States
bronze medal	Vinicius Lanza	Brazil

The men's 100 metre butterfly competition at the 2018 Pan Pacific Swimming Championships took place on August 11 at the Tokyo Tatsumi International Swimming Center. The defending champion was Michael Phelps of the United States.

== Records ==
Prior to this competition, the existing world and Pan Pacific records were as follows:

World record	Michael Phelps (USA)	49.82	Rome, Italy	1 August 2009
Pan Pacific Championships record	Michael Phelps (USA)	50.86	Irvine, United States	20 August 2010

== Results ==
All times are in minutes and seconds.

KEY:	QA	Qualified A Final	QB	Qualified B Final	CR	Championships record	NR	National record	PB	Personal best	SB	Seasonal best

=== Heats ===
The first round was held on 11 August from 10:00.

Only two swimmers from each country may advance to the A or B final. If a country not qualify any swimmer to the A final, that same country may qualify up to three swimmers to the B final.

Rank	Name	Nationality	Time	Notes
1	Caeleb Dressel	United States	51.69	QA
2	Jack Conger	United States	51.76	QA
3	Vinicius Lanza	Brazil	51.98	QA
4	Grant Irvine	Australia	51.99	QA
4	Michael Andrew	United States	51.99	QB
6	Yuki Kobori	Japan	52.23	QA
7	Iago Moussalem	Brazil	52.27	QA
8	Zach Harting	United States	52.46	QB
9	David Morgan	Australia	52.47	QA
10	Yuya Yajima	Japan	52.86	QA
11	Josiah Binnema	Canada	53.04	QB
12	Will Pisani	Canada	53.13	QB
13	Leonardo de Deus	Brazil	53.14	QB
14	Shen Jiahao	China	53.16	QB
15	Mack Darragh	Canada	53.18	QB
16	Shinri Shioura	Japan	53.33	~~QB~~, WD
17	Nao Horomura	Japan	53.48	QB
18	Owen Daly	Canada	53.91	
19	Zhou Shuchang	China	54.12	
20	Jarod Hatch	Philippines	54.75	
21	Ruslan Gaziev	Canada	54.97	
22	Timothy Yen	Philippines	56.40	
23	Rafael Barreto	Philippines	56.70	
24	Armand Chan	Philippines	1:00.08	
25	Noel Keane	Palau	1:02.43	NR
26	Nelson Batallones	Northern Mariana Islands	1:08.95	
27	Mark Imazu	Guam	1:08.95	

=== B Final ===
The B final was held on 11 August from 18:00.

Rank	Name	Nationality	Time	Notes
9	Michael Andrew	United States	51.53	
10	Zach Harting	United States	52.16	
11	Josiah Binnema	Canada	52.71	
12	Shen Jiahao	China	52.81	
13	Will Pisani	Canada	52.94	
14	Leonardo de Deus	Brazil	53.19	
15	Nao Horomura	Japan	53.26	
16	Mack Darragh	Canada	53.71	

=== A Final ===
The A final was held on 11 August from 18:00.

Rank	Name	Nationality	Time	Notes
1st place, gold medalist(s)	Caeleb Dressel	United States	50.75	CR
2nd place, silver medalist(s)	Jack Conger	United States	51.32	
3rd place, bronze medalist(s)	Vinicius Lanza	Brazil	51.44	
4	Grant Irvine	Australia	51.65	
5	David Morgan	Australia	51.80	
6	Yuki Kobori	Japan	51.82	
7	Iago Moussalem	Brazil	52.17	
8	Yuya Yajima	Japan	52.70	
