= Bradlee Ashby =

New Zealand swimmer (born 1995)

Personal information
- National team: New Zealand
- Born: 23 November 1995 (age 30) Hamilton

Sport
- Sport: Swimming
- Strokes: Backstroke, butterfly, individual medley
Medal record
Men's swimming
Representing New Zealand
Junior Pan Pacific Championships
Bronze medal – third place	2014 Maui	100 m butterfly
Bronze medal – third place	2014 Maui	400 m medley

Bradlee Logan Taylor Ashby (born 23 November 1995) is a New Zealand swimmer who represented his country at the 2016 Summer Olympics in Rio de Janeiro, Brazil. He competed in the men's 200-metre individual medley and 200-metre butterfly.

== Personal life ==
Ashby was born on 23 November 1995 in Hamilton. He is studying for a bachelor's degree in Business Studies at Massey University.

== Career ==
Ashby trains in Auckland as part of the Swimming New Zealand High-Performance squad. He is a member of North Shore Swimming club in Auckland.

His first international appearances representing New Zealand were in 2013 at the Australian Youth Olympic Festival and the FINA World Junior Championships, where he competed in the 200 and 400 metre individual medley events, finishing 17th in the 400 metre event in a time of four minutes 30.34 seconds.

In 2015 he competed at the 16th FINA World Championships held in Kazan, Russia. He took part in the 100 metre and 200 metre butterfly, the 200 metre individual medley and swam the butterfly leg in the men's 4 × 100 metre medley relay. He did not advance from the heats in any of his events finishing 47th in the 100 metre butterfly, 33rd in the 200 metre butterfly, 25th in the medley, and 16th in the medley relay.

At the 2016 New Zealand open swimming championships he broke the national record in the men's 200 metres individual medley in his heat, reaching the qualification standard for the 2016 Summer Olympics in the process. His finishing time of exactly two minutes was 28/100ths of a second under the qualifying time for the Olympics, and 0.3 seconds inside the previous national record set by Dean Kent in 2007. He went on to win both the 200 metres individual medley and 200 metres backstroke events, finishing the backstroke final in a time of two minutes 1.40 seconds.
