= Caeleb Dressel =

American swimmer (born 1996)

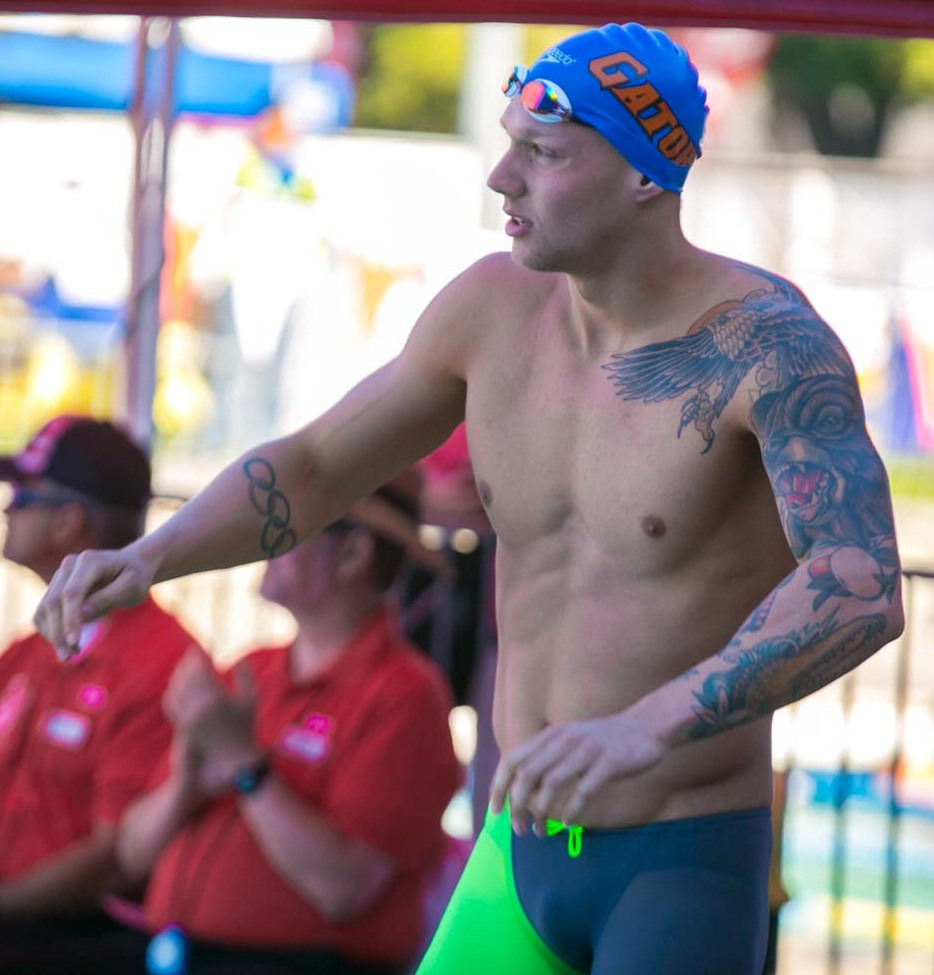
- Dressel in 2018

Personal information
- Full name: Caeleb Remel Dressel
- National team: United States
- Born: August 16, 1996 (age 30) Green Cove Springs, Florida, U.S.
- Height: 6 ft 3 in (1.91 m)
- Weight: 201 lb (91 kg)
- Spouse: Meghan Haila (m. 2021)
- Children: 2

Sport
- Sport: Swimming
- Strokes: Butterfly, Freestyle
- Club: Jax Aquatics Club Cali Condors; Gator Swim Club
- College team: University of Florida
- Coach: Anthony Nesty; Steve Jungbluth; Gregg Troy (former)
Medal record
Men's swimming
Representing the United States
Event	1st	2nd	3rd
Olympic Games	9	1	0
World Championships (LC)	15	2	0
World Championships (SC)	6	3	0
Pan Pacific Championships	2	2	1
World Junior Championships	1	2	3
Total	33	10	4
Olympic Games
Gold medal – first place	2016 Rio de Janeiro	4×100 m freestyle
Gold medal – first place	2016 Rio de Janeiro	4×100 m medley
Gold medal – first place	2020 Tokyo	50 m freestyle
Gold medal – first place	2020 Tokyo	100 m freestyle
Gold medal – first place	2020 Tokyo	100 m butterfly
Gold medal – first place	2020 Tokyo	4×100 m freestyle
Gold medal – first place	2020 Tokyo	4×100 m medley
Gold medal – first place	2024 Paris	4×100 m freestyle
Gold medal – first place	2024 Paris	4×100 m mixed medley
Silver medal – second place	2024 Paris	4x100 m medley
World Championships (LC)
Gold medal – first place	2017 Budapest	50 m freestyle
Gold medal – first place	2017 Budapest	100 m freestyle
Gold medal – first place	2017 Budapest	100 m butterfly
Gold medal – first place	2017 Budapest	4×100 m freestyle
Gold medal – first place	2017 Budapest	4×100 m medley
Gold medal – first place	2017 Budapest	4×100 m mixed freestyle
Gold medal – first place	2017 Budapest	4×100 m mixed medley
Gold medal – first place	2019 Gwangju	50 m freestyle
Gold medal – first place	2019 Gwangju	100 m freestyle
Gold medal – first place	2019 Gwangju	50 m butterfly
Gold medal – first place	2019 Gwangju	100 m butterfly
Gold medal – first place	2019 Gwangju	4×100 m freestyle
Gold medal – first place	2019 Gwangju	4×100 m mixed freestyle
Gold medal – first place	2022 Budapest	50 m butterfly
Gold medal – first place	2022 Budapest	4×100 m freestyle
Silver medal – second place	2019 Gwangju	4×100 m medley
Silver medal – second place	2019 Gwangju	4×100 m mixed medley
World Championships (SC)
Gold medal – first place	2018 Hangzhou	100 m freestyle
Gold medal – first place	2018 Hangzhou	4×50 m freestyle
Gold medal – first place	2018 Hangzhou	4×100 m freestyle
Gold medal – first place	2018 Hangzhou	4×100 m medley
Gold medal – first place	2018 Hangzhou	4×50 m mixed freestyle
Gold medal – first place	2018 Hangzhou	4×50 m mixed medley
Silver medal – second place	2018 Hangzhou	50 m freestyle
Silver medal – second place	2018 Hangzhou	100 m butterfly
Silver medal – second place	2018 Hangzhou	4×50 m medley
Pan Pacific Championships
Gold medal – first place	2018 Tokyo	100 m butterfly
Gold medal – first place	2018 Tokyo	4×100 m medley
Silver medal – second place	2018 Tokyo	50 m freestyle
Silver medal – second place	2018 Tokyo	100 m freestyle
Bronze medal – third place	2018 Tokyo	4×100 m mixed medley
World Junior Championships
Gold medal – first place	2013 Dubai	100 m freestyle
Silver medal – second place	2013 Dubai	4×100 m freestyle
Silver medal – second place	2013 Dubai	4×100 m mixed freestyle
Bronze medal – third place	2013 Dubai	50 m freestyle
Bronze medal – third place	2013 Dubai	4×200 m freestyle
Bronze medal – third place	2013 Dubai	4×100 m mixed medley
Representing the Florida Gators
Event	1st	2nd	3rd
NCAA Championships	10	4	2
Total	10	4	2
By race
Event	1st	2nd	3rd
50 y freestyle	4	0	0
100 y freestyle	3	0	0
100 y butterfly	2	1	0
4×50 y freestyle	1	1	0
4×100 y freestyle	0	2	1
4×100 y medley	0	0	1
Total	10	4	2
NCAA Championships
Gold medal – first place	2015 Iowa City	50 y freestyle
Gold medal – first place	2016 Atlanta	50 y freestyle
Gold medal – first place	2016 Atlanta	100 y freestyle
Gold medal – first place	2017 Indianapolis	50 y freestyle
Gold medal – first place	2017 Indianapolis	100 y freestyle
Gold medal – first place	2017 Indianapolis	100 y butterfly
Gold medal – first place	2018 Minneapolis	50 y freestyle
Gold medal – first place	2018 Minneapolis	100 y freestyle
Gold medal – first place	2018 Minneapolis	100 y butterfly
Gold medal – first place	2018 Minneapolis	4x50 y freestyle
Silver medal – second place	2016 Atlanta	100 y butterfly
Silver medal – second place	2017 Indianapolis	4×50 y freestyle
Silver medal – second place	2017 Indianapolis	4×100 y freestyle
Silver medal – second place	2018 Minneapolis	4x100 y freestyle
Bronze medal – third place	2016 Atlanta	4×100 y freestyle
Bronze medal – third place	2018 Minneapolis	4×100 y medley

Caeleb Remel Dressel (born August 16, 1996) is an American competitive swimmer who specializes in freestyle, butterfly, and individual medley events. He won a record seven gold medals at the 2017 World Aquatics Championships in Budapest, nine medals, six of which were gold, at the 2018 World Short Course Swimming Championships in Hangzhou, and eight medals, including six gold, at the 2019 World Aquatics Championships in Gwangju. Dressel is a nine-time Olympic gold medalist and holds world records in the 100 meter butterfly (long course), and 100 meter individual medley (short course).

At the 2020 Summer Olympics in Tokyo, Dressel won five gold medals, which made him the fifth American to win five gold medals in a single Olympic Games after 1970. Mark Spitz, Michael Phelps (3 times), Eric Heiden, and Matt Biondi were the other four. He also became the first male swimmer to win gold medals in the 50 meter freestyle, the 100 meter freestyle, and the 100 meter butterfly at the same Olympics. At the 2024 Summer Olympics in Paris, Dressel won gold medals in the 4×100 freestyle relay and 4x100 mixed medley relay, putting him in a joint tie for 2nd-most Olympic golds after Michael Phelps.

Dressel holds American records in the 50 meter freestyle, 50 meter and 100 meter butterfly (long course), and the 50 meter freestyle and 100 meter butterfly (short course). He also holds American records in the 50 yard and 100 yard freestyle events, and the 100 yard butterfly, and formerly held national records in the 100 yard breaststroke and the 200 yard individual medley. Over the course of his collegiate career, he won NCAA titles in the 50 yard freestyle, 100 yard freestyle, and 100 yard butterfly individual events. He is widely regarded as one of the greatest sprinters in swimming history.

== Early life ==
Dressel was born on August 16, 1996, in Green Cove Springs, Florida, the son of Christina and Michael Dressel. His father is a veterinarian specializing in urgent care for cats and dogs. Dressel is the third of four children; his three siblings, one brother and two sisters, plus his father were all competitive swimmers setting records and earning honors across the high school and university levels. He and his siblings learned to swim at a young age, for him when he was 4 years old, and by the time Dressel was 8 years old he had committed to competitive year-round swimming.

Dressel attended Clay High School in Green Cove Springs, Florida, and trained with the Bolles School Sharks in Jacksonville where he met his then training partner and now wife, Meghan Haila. He was a collegiate swimmer at the University of Florida starting in 2014 and majored in Resources and Conservation.

== Sport career ==
=== 2012 ===
He led off a 50-yard free relay with a time of 19.82, becoming the first swimmer under 16 years old to break 20 seconds.

==== 2012 US Olympic Trials ====
At the 2012 United States Olympic Trials, Dressel was the youngest male swimmer at 15 years of age and ranked 100th in the 200 meter individual medley in a time of 2:08.08, 121st in the 100 meter butterfly at 57.21 seconds, 121st with a time of 1:55.17 in the 200 meter freestyle, tied for 145th in the 50 meter freestyle with a time of 23.87 seconds, and tied for 152nd in the 100 meter freestyle with his time of 52.21 seconds. After not making the 2012 US Olympic Team, Dressel refocused and set his sights on the 2016 Summer Olympics.

=== 2013 ===
==== 2013 World Junior Championships ====
2013 World Junior Championships
Gold medal – first place	100 m freestyle	48.97 (CR)
Silver medal – second place	4x100 m freestyle	3:19.21
Silver medal – second place	4x100 m mixed freestyle	3:29.56
Bronze medal – third place	50 m freestyle	22.22
Bronze medal – third place	4x200 m freestyle	7:17.67
Bronze medal – third place	4x100 m mixed medley	3:52.63

When Dressel was 17 years old, he won six medals, including a gold medal in the 100 meter freestyle in which he broke the Championships record with his time of 48.97 seconds, at the 2013 FINA World Junior Swimming Championships in Dubai, United Arab Emirates in August 2013. His time also broke the National Age Group record set by Michael Phelps in the 100 meter freestyle in 2004 for the 17–18 year old age group by eight hundredths of a second. His other medals were in the 4x100 meter freestyle relay and the mixed 4x100 meter freestyle relay, where he won a silver medal in each event, and in the 50 meter freestyle, 4x200 meter freestyle relay, and the mixed 4x100 meter medley relay in which he won a bronze medal in each. In addition to the events Dressel medaled in, he competed in the 200 meter freestyle where he finished sixth with a time of 1:49.29 and swam in the final of the 4x100 meter medley relay which did not place as it was disqualified. In total, his medal breakdown was one gold medal, two silver medals, and three bronze medals.

==== 2013 US Junior National Championships ====
At the 2013 Speedo Winter Junior National Championships (the USA Swimming sanctioned national championship meet for 18 and under swimmers), Dressel became the youngest swimmer in history to break the 19 second barrier in the 50 yard freestyle, swimming an 18.94 to lead off his club team's relay.

=== 2015 ===
==== 2015 NCAA Championships ====
During his freshman year at the University of Florida, Dressel won the 2015 NCAA title in the 50 yard freestyle when he was 18 years old with a time of 18.67 seconds, which was his first NCAA title, the first NCAA title for the Florida Gators in the men's 50 yard freestyle, and set a new 17—18 national age group record in the event. With his performance, Dressel also became the fastest freshman in the 50 yard freestyle in the history of the NCAA and the second-fastest American in the event, only behind Nathan Adrian.

==== 2015 National Championships ====
At the senior 2015 National Championships (long course) in San Antonio, Texas, he won two individual titles, in the 50 meter and the 100 meter freestyle. His winning time of 21.53 in the 50 meter freestyle ranked 4th in the world for 2015.

=== 2016 ===
==== 2016 NCAA Championships ====
At the 2016 Men's NCAA Division I Championships, he broke the American and US Open records in the 50-yard freestyle with a time of 18.20 and the 100-yard freestyle with 40.46.

==== 2016 US Olympic Trials ====
At the 2016 US Olympic Trials, Dressel made the 2016 US Olympic Team in the 100 meter freestyle by finishing second with a time of 48.23 seconds, he also placed 4th in the 50 meter freestyle, 7th in the 100 meter butterfly, 32nd in the 200 meter freestyle, and was disqualified in the 200 meter individual medley for a false start. In addition to the five events he raced, Dressel had entered to compete in the 100 meter breaststroke with his best time of 1:02.26 and the 100 meter backstroke, and decided not to race the events. Dressel's performances leading up to and at the 2016 US Olympic Trials earned him recognition as America's best young sprinter by Sports Illustrated and CBS News. Overall, Dressel and coach Gregg Troy chose a forwards mentality to Dressel's training, with Troy expressing Dressel's best could still be four, eight, or more years down the road.

==== 2016 Summer Olympics ====
2016 Summer Olympics
Gold medal – first place	4×100 m freestyle	3:09.92
Gold medal – first place	4×100 m medley	3:27.95

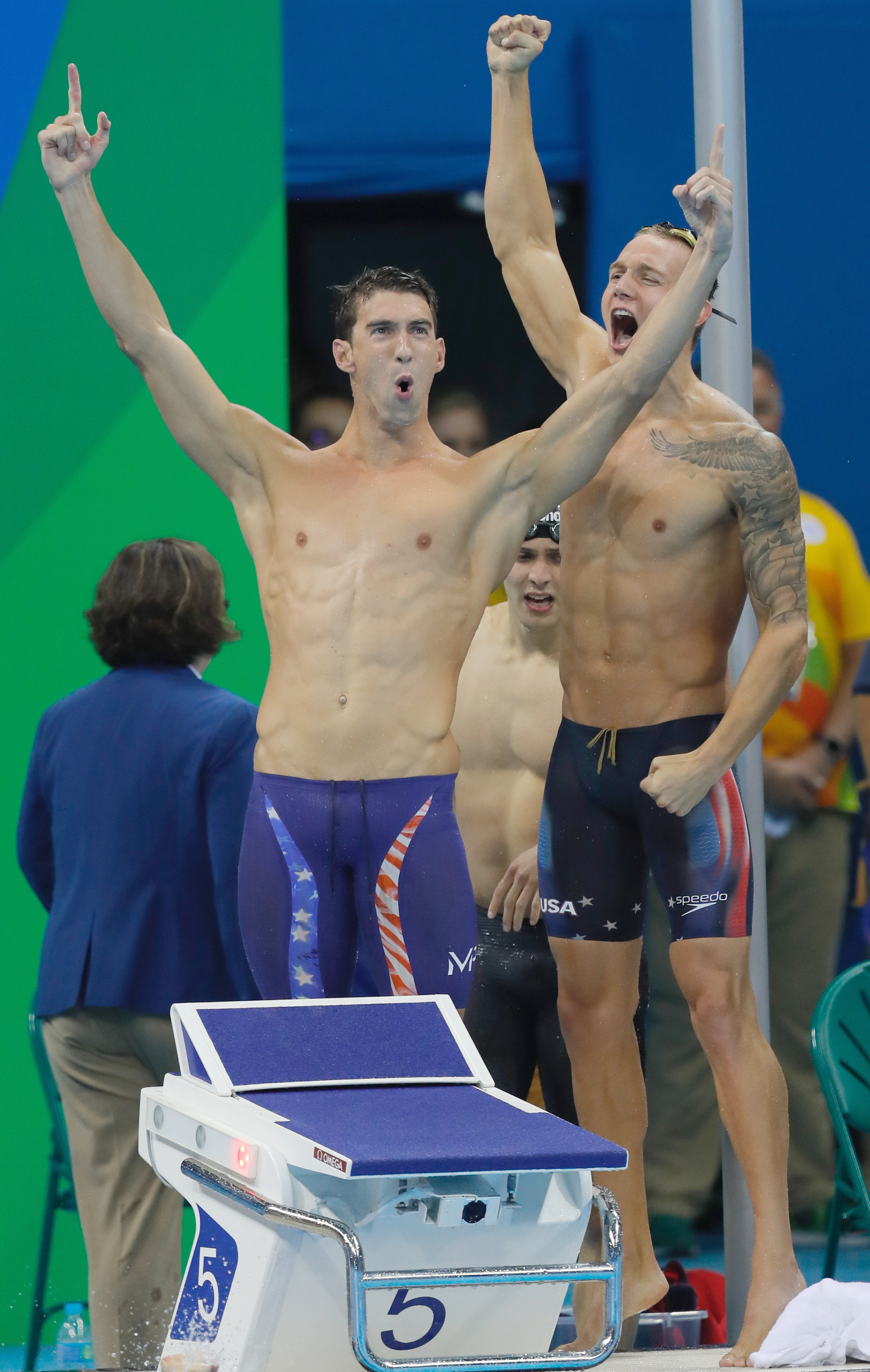
Michael Phelps and Dressel (right) after winning the 4 × 100 m freestyle relay at the 2016 Olympics

At the 2016 Summer Olympics in Rio de Janeiro, Brazil, Dressel won his first Olympic medal, a gold medal, in the 4×100 meter freestyle relay. In the final, he swam the first leg in 48.10 seconds, which was the second-fastest lead-off relay leg in the finals heat, and was followed by relay teammates Michael Phelps, Ryan Held, and Nathan Adrian in that order. The American team recorded a time of 3:09.92. Of the 13 medals won by Florida Gators at the 2020 Summer Olympics, Dressel became the first athlete to win a medal from the university's sports teams with this gold medal. Dressel and his finals relay teammates earned USA Swimming's Golden Goggle Award for best relay performance of the year in 2016 for their efforts. Dressel and his teammates shared tears in the medal ceremony and while doing a victory lap around the pool after they received their medals, their tearful reactions were highlighted by local news outlet The Florida Times-Union. The relay was also highlighted by SwimSwam as one of their five unforgettable moments of the 2016 Summer Olympics.

In the 100 meter freestyle, Dressel finished sixth in the final in a time of 48.02 seconds with fellow United States swimmer Nathan Adrian taking the bronze medal and Kyle Chalmers of Australia winning the gold medal.

Dressel also swam freestyle in the heats of the 4×100 meter medley relay, and won his second gold medal of the 2016 Olympic Games when the finals relay of Ryan Murphy (backstroke), Cody Miller (breaststroke), Michael Phelps (butterfly), and Nathan Adrian (freestyle) placed first in Olympic record time. He swam a time of 47.74 seconds for the freestyle leg of the prelims relay consisting of him, David Plummer (backstroke), Kevin Cordes (breaststroke), and Tom Shields (butterfly).

=== 2017 ===
==== 2017 NCAA Championships ====
His junior year of collegiate swimming and leading up to the 2017 NCAA Championships, Dressel became the second person to split under 18.00 seconds for 50 yards of freestyle on a relay, splitting a 17.90 on the 4×50 yard medley relay at the 2017 Southeastern Conference Championships, which was just 0.04 seconds off the fastest split time of 17.86 seconds swam by Vladimir Morozov his junior year in 2013. At the 2017 NCAA Division I Championships, he broke the American and US Open records in the 100-yard butterfly and the 100-yard freestyle with times of 43.58 and 40.00, respectively. He also tied his 50 freestyle record with an 18.20, the same as the preceding year.

==== 2017 World Championships ====
2017 World Championships
Gold medal – first place	50 m freestyle	21.15 (NR)
Gold medal – first place	100 m freestyle	47.17 (NR)
Gold medal – first place	100 m butterfly	49.86
Gold medal – first place	4×100 m freestyle	3:10.06
Gold medal – first place	4×100 m medley	3:27.91
Gold medal – first place	4×100 m mixed freestyle	3:19.60 (WR)
Gold medal – first place	4×100 m mixed medley	3:38.56 (WR)

At the 2017 World Aquatics Championships in Budapest, Hungary, Dressel won seven gold medals and set numerous American records. Dressel was named the male swimmer of the meet. He also became the second swimmer to win seven gold medals at a single World Championships, after Michael Phelps in 2007.

On the first day of competition, July 23, Dressel set the American record in the 50 meter butterfly with a time of 22.76, topping the semifinals. Later that evening in the 4×100 meter freestyle relay, Dressel set the American record in the 100 meter freestyle with a time of 47.26 in the leadoff leg. Combined with Townley Haas, Blake Pieroni, and Nathan Adrian, the American team won gold with a time of 3:10.06, earning him his first gold of the Championships.

On day two, Dressel finished fourth in the 50 meter butterfly final with a time of 22.89, missing a medal by 0.05 seconds. On day four, Dressel took part in the 4×100 meter mixed medley relay, swimming the butterfly leg and splitting a 49.92. Along with teammates Matt Grevers, Lilly King, and Simone Manuel, the American team won gold in a new world-record time of 3:38.56. That time broke the record set earlier in the day by Ryan Murphy, Kevin Cordes, Kelsi Worrell, and Mallory Comerford. On day five, Dressel re-set the 100-meter freestyle American record with a 47.17 in the 100 meter freestyle final, en route to winning gold by a margin of 0.70 seconds over silver medalist and teammate Nathan Adrian.

On day seven, Dressel became the first swimmer ever to win three gold medals on a single day. He won the 50 meter freestyle in 21.15, a new world textile best time. Half an hour later he won the 100 meter butterfly in 49.86, again a new world textile best and 0.04 seconds above the world record held by Michael Phelps. The third gold medal came in the 4×100 meter mixed freestyle relay, where he led off in 47.22. Dressel and teammates Adrian, Comerford, and Manuel broke the world record for this relay with a time of 3:19.60.

On the eighth and last day of competition, Dressel won his 7th gold in the 4×100-meter medley relay. Swimming the butterfly leg, Dressel recorded a time of 49.76 and the American team of Matt Grevers, Kevin Cordes, and Nathan Adrian won with a time of 3:27.91.

=== 2018 ===
==== 2018 SEC Championships ====
At the 2018 Southeastern Conference, SEC, Swimming and Diving Championships in College Station, Texas, in February, Dressel lowered his best time in the 100 yard breaststroke from a 51.88 to a 50.03, which broke the former American, US Open, and NCAA records set by Kevin Cordes in 2014 at 50.04 by one hundredth of a second. Earlier in the Championships, Dressel also set a new American record in the 200 yard individual medley with his time of 1:38.13, lowering the record set by David Nolan in 2015 by 0.25 seconds. Dressel's 100 yard breaststroke record garnered the attention of 2016 Olympic bronze medalist in breaststroke, Cody Miller, who produced a perspective piece on the American record and posted it to his, Miller's, YouTube channel less than two weeks after Dressel broke the record. Later on, in August 2020, Dressel provided his analysis of the record in a video and put it on his own YouTube channel.

==== 2018 NCAA Championships ====
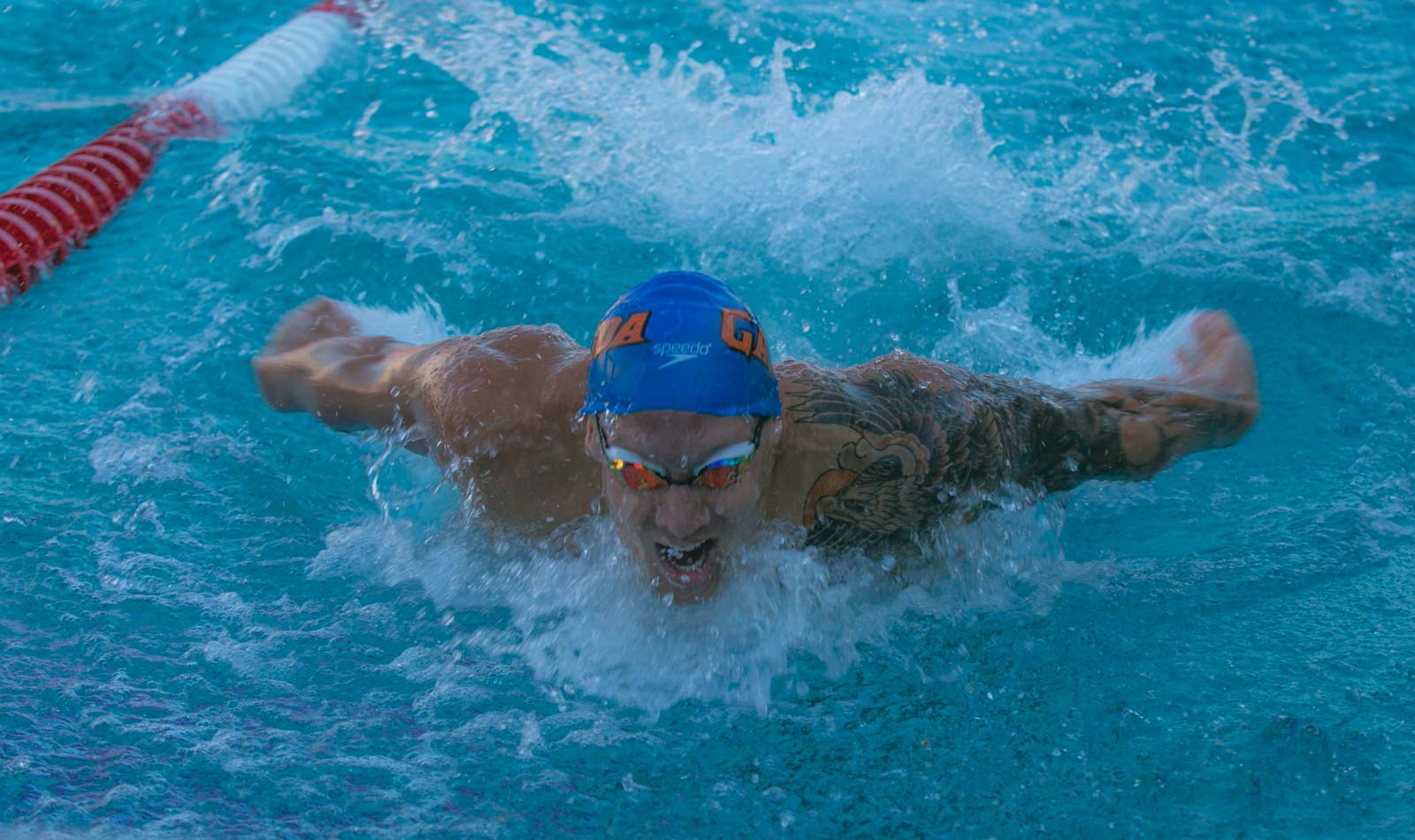
Dressel in the 100 fly

At the 2018 NCAA Division I Men's Swimming and Diving Championships in March, Dressel won all three of his individual races, and won his first relay national title.

On day 2 of the competition, March 22, 2018, Dressel broke the NCAA, American, and US Open records in the 50 yard freestyle thrice. He first swam an 18.11 in the individual preliminaries race in the morning session. He later improved upon that record in the evening leading off The University of Florida's national championship winning relay with a 17.81 split, and finalized his record with a 17.63 in the 50 yard freestyle final. The next day, he broke the American and US open records in the 100 yard butterfly, swimming a 42.80. On the final day of competition, Dressel won the 100 yard freestyle by more than a second in a time of 39.90, completing his sweep of individual events for a second time. This secured him CSCAA Swimmer of the Meet honors for the third year in a row, as he became the first swimmer ever to break the 18 second 50 free barrier, the 40 second 100 free barrier, and the 43 second 100 fly barrier in the history of yards swimming. His split of 17.30 on the 4×50 yard medley relay marked the fastest 50 yard freestyle split time in the history of the NCAA.

==== 2018 National Championships ====
In advance of the 2018 National Championships, Dressel was highlighted by NBC Sports as one of ten swimmers to watch at the meet with his entries in the 50 meter freestyle, 50 meter breaststroke, 50 meter butterfly, 100 meter freestyle, 100 meter breaststroke, 100 meter butterfly, 200 meter freestyle, and 200 meter individual medley. At the 2018 US National Championships held in July 2018 in Irvine, California, Dressel won the 100 meter butterfly with a time of 50.50 seconds after finishing second in the 50 meter butterfly and sixth in the 100 meter freestyle. Dressel's win in the 100 meter butterfly secured him a spot on the Pan Pacific Championships team, where he could also compete in the 100 meter freestyle even though he finished sixth because qualified athletes were allowed to compete in any event at the meet. He also placed second in the 50 meter freestyle with a time of 21.67, just 0.18 seconds behind Michael Andrew, and decided not to swim the 50 meter breaststroke, 100 meter breaststroke, 200 meter freestyle, and 200 meter individual medley.

==== 2018 Pan Pacific Championships ====
2018 Pan Pacific Championships
Gold medal – first place	100 m butterfly	50.75 (CR)
Gold medal – first place	4x100 m medley	3:30.20
Silver medal – second place	50 m freestyle	21.93
Silver medal – second place	100 m freestyle	48.22
Bronze medal – third place	4x100 m mixed medley	3:41.74

In August 2018 at the 2018 Pan Pacific Championships in Tokyo, Japan, Dressel won the 100 meter butterfly after tying for second place in the 100 meter freestyle. His winning time of 50.75 seconds in the 100 meter butterfly set a new Championships record in the event. He won the silver medal in the 50 meter freestyle with a time of 21.93, finishing only behind fellow American Michael Andrew, and won a gold medal in the 4x100 meter medley relay alongside Ryan Murphy who swam backstroke, Andrew Wilson who swam breaststroke, and Nathan Adrian who swam freestyle. In the mixed 4x100 meter medley relay, Dressel swam the butterfly leg of the relay with a split time of 50.50 seconds, helping the relay consisting of him, Kathleen Baker, Michael Andrew, and Simone Manuel, finish third and win the bronze medal with a final time of 3:41.74. For the 4x100 meter freestyle relay, Dressel and his relay teammates Nathan Adrian, Zach Apple, and Blake Pieroni were disqualified for not swimming in the order they had submitted to the officials. After the meet, reports surfaced that Dressel had missed two weeks of training in June while recovering from a motorcycle accident, which had perhaps hampered his performance and prevented him for equaling his times from the previous year.

==== 2018 World Short Course Championships ====
2018 World Short Course Championships
Gold medal – first place	100 m freestyle	45.62 (NR)
Gold medal – first place	4x100 m freestyle	3:03:03 (WR)
Gold medal – first place	4x50 m mixed freestyle	1:27.89 (WR)
Gold medal – first place	4x50 m mixed medley	1:36.40 (WR)
Gold medal – first place	4x50 m freestyle	1:21.80 (WR)
Gold medal – first place	4x100 m medley	3:19.98 (AM, CR)
Silver medal – second place	50 m freestyle	20.54
Silver medal – second place	100 m butterfly	48.71
Silver medal – second place	4x50 m medley	1:30.90 (NR)

At the 2018 World Short Course Championships in Hangzhou, China in December 2018, Dressel tied Kelsi Dahlia for the most number of medals won at the World Championships meet with nine medals, he won six gold medals to Dahlia's seven. He swam on the same finals relay as Olivia Smoliga in the mixed 4x50 meter medley relay, both helping set a new swimming world record in the event and win the gold medal. Dressel's efforts contributed to Smoliga's winning eight gold medals at the Championships and breaking Dressel's former Guinness World Record for "most number of gold medals won at a single FINA World Championships (individual)", which he held from 2017 when he won seven gold medals.

Dressel won the silver medal in the 100 meter butterfly with a time of 48.71 seconds, twenty-one hundredths of a second behind gold medalist Chad le Clos of South Africa. In the 4x50 meter freestyle relay, Dressel swam in the final, helped the relay earn the gold medal and set a world record in the event, and split a 20.43 on the first leg of the relay, setting a new American record in the 50 meter freestyle. For the 50 meter freestyle individual race, Dressel won the silver medal with a time of 20.54 seconds.

In the 100 meter freestyle, Dressel won the gold medal in an American record time of 45.62 seconds. Along with Blake Pieroni, Michael Chadwick, and Ryan Held in the final of the 4x100 meter freestyle relay, Dressel won a gold medal with the relay finishing in a world record time of 3:03:03. He also won a gold medal in the mixed 4x50 meter freestyle relay in world record time, a gold medal in the 4x100 meter medley relay in Americas record and Championships record time, the silver medal in the 4x50 meter medley relay in American record time, and entered as one of two male American swimmers in the 50 meter butterfly, though decided not to swim in the event at the Championships.

=== 2019 ===
On May 17, 2019, Dressel edged out Chase Kalisz in the 100 meter breaststroke at the 2019 Atlanta Classic in Atlanta with a time of 1:01.22 in the final, dropping over a second from his best time of 1:02.26 heading into the 2016 Olympic Trials, and qualifying for the 2020 US Olympic Trials in the event.

==== 2019 World Championships ====
2019 World Championships
Gold medal – first place	50 m freestyle	21.04 (NR)
Gold medal – first place	100 m freestyle	46.96 (NR)
Gold medal – first place	50 m butterfly	22.35 (AM)
Gold medal – first place	100 m butterfly	49.50 (sf) (WR)
Gold medal – first place	4×100 m freestyle	3:09.06 (CR)
Gold medal – first place	4×100 m mixed freestyle	3:19.40 (WR)
Silver medal – second place	4×100 m medley	3:28.45
Silver medal – second place	4×100 m mixed medley	3:39.10

At the 2019 World Aquatics Championships held in Gwangju, South Korea, he first won a gold as part of the team in men's 4×100 meter freestyle relay. He then won gold in the 50 meter butterfly, an event he failed to win in 2017. He is the first American man to win that event, and he set a new national and championship record time of 22.35 seconds for the event. This is followed by a national record and the third fastest time in history (46.96) in the 100 meter freestyle.

In the 100 meter butterfly event, Dressel broke Michael Phelps' ten-year-old record by 0.32 second in the semi-final, setting a new world-record time of 49.50 seconds. He won gold in the final the following day. That same day within two hours, Dressel won two more gold medals – in the 50 meter freestyle in a Championships record time, and as part of the team in the mixed 4×100 meter freestyle relay, which was won in a world-record time of 3 minutes, 19.40 seconds. This was a repeat of his achievement in Hungary in 2017, and it was also the first time anyone won three gold medals in one day at the Championships two times.

In the final day of the Championships, Dressel helped win a silver medal in the men's 4×100 meter medley relay. The medal was the eighth that Dressel won at the Championships, and the most medals of any type that a person had won at a single long course Championships. FINA named Dressel male swimmer of the meet, which he also won in 2017.

==== International Swimming League ====
In 2019 he was a member of the inaugural International Swimming League representing the Cali Condors, who finished third place in the final match in Las Vegas, Nevada in December. Dressel won the Most Valuable Player of the match honor in all 3 matches he participated in as well as winning the skins race each time. Dressel swam the 50 meter freestyle in Las Vegas and beat Florent Manaudou's world record of 20.26 from 2014 by going a 20.24. He also won the 100 meter freestyle, 100 meter butterfly, and 50 meter butterfly.

=== 2020 ===
==== International Swimming League ====
Continuing to represent the Cali Condors, Dressel broke four world records in the 100-meter butterfly (at 47.78 seconds) and the 50-meter freestyle world record, which he already held (to 20.16 seconds). He is the first person to swim the 100-meter butterfly in less than 48 seconds. He also broke his own 100 IM record twice, dropping it to 49.88 the first time, and 49.28 the second time. These two record breaks occurred one weekend after he was the first swimmer to ever do the 100-meter individual medley in under 50 seconds.

==== 2020 US Olympic Trials ====
In total, Dressel qualified to compete in seven events at the Olympic Trials: the 50 meter freestyle, 100 meter freestyle, 200 meter freestyle, 100 meter butterfly, 200 meter butterfly, 100 meter breaststroke, and 200 meter individual medley.

On day two of the 2020 USA Swimming Olympic Trials (held in June 2021 due to the COVID-19 pandemic), June 14, 2021, Dressel competed in the 200 meter freestyle prelims in the morning, swimming a 1:46.63 and ranking 2nd overall for the heats. Dressel's swim moved him up in rankings to the all-time 20th fastest American in the event. Following his morning swim, Dressel decided not to swim in the event's semifinals.

On day four of competition, Wednesday June 16, 2021, Dressel ranked 5th out of all prelims heats in the 100 meter freestyle swimming a 48.25 and advancing to the semifinals. In the semifinals in the evening of the same day, Dressel ranked first with a time of 47.77 and advanced to the final. On day five, June 17, 2021, Dressel won the 100 m freestyle with a time of 47.39 and qualifying him for the US Olympic Swimming team in the 100 m freestyle and the 4 × 100 m freestyle relay for the 2020 Summer Olympics. He tied the US Open record and Championships record for the 100 meter freestyle with his swim. This marked the second Olympic Games Dressel qualified to compete at.

On day six, Dressel won the prelims heats of the 100 meter butterfly with a 50.17 breaking the US Open record and Championships record. On the same day in the semifinals, he improved further on his US Open record dropping it to a 49.76, earning Dressel the top 3 times in history in the event.

In the morning of day seven, Dressel swam a 21.29 in the prelims heats of the 50 meter freestyle, taking first, breaking the Championships record, and advancing to the semifinals. In the evening of day seven, Dressel swam in the final of the 100 meter butterfly and the semifinals of the 50 meter freestyle. In the final of the 100 meter butterfly, Dressel swam a 49.87, winning the final and swimming under 50 seconds for the fifth time. His swim qualified him to represent the United States in the 100 meter butterfly at the 2020 Summer Olympics. In the semifinals of the 50 meter freestyle, Dressel posted a 21.51, advancing as the fastest seed to the final.

On the final day, Dressel qualified to swim the 50 meter freestyle at the 2020 Olympic Games by winning the final with a time of 21.04. Dressel's swim also tied his personal best time and set a new US Open record.

Dressel's engagement with fans, including a look-alike, and embracing being a role model for swimmers across America during the Olympic Trials led Swimming World to herald Dressel as "the face of USA Swimming's men's team".

==== 2020 Summer Olympics ====
2020 Summer Olympics
Gold medal – first place	4×100 m freestyle	3:08.97
Gold medal – first place	100 m freestyle	47.02 (OR)
Gold medal – first place	100 m butterfly	49.45 (WR)
Gold medal – first place	50 m freestyle	21.07 (OR)
Gold medal – first place	4x100 m medley	3:26.78 (WR)

Dressel was selected as one of two male USA swimming captains for the 2020 Summer Olympics in Tokyo, Japan, held in August 2021, along with Ryan Murphy.

On day three of competition, Dressel won his first medal at the 2020 Olympics swimming in the finals of the 4x100 meter freestyle relay. He helped the relay win the gold medal, swimming the relay's lead-off leg and splitting the second fastest time among his relay teammates Blake Pieroni, Bowe Becker, and Zach Apple with a 47.26.

On day four, Dressel ranked second overall in the prelims heats of the 100 meter freestyle with a time of 47.73 and advanced to the semifinals. The following morning of competition, he swam a 47.23 in his semifinal heat and advanced to the final ranking second for both semifinal heats. Dressel won his first individual Olympic gold medal in the final of the 100 meter freestyle with a time of 47.02, a new Olympic record. Dressel finished six hundredths of a second ahead of Australian Kyle Chalmers, which was a changing of Olympic champion from the 2016 Summer Olympics where Chalmers won the gold medal and Dressel finished sixth in the 100 meter freestyle. People and Parade magazines highlighted Dressel and his wife, Meghan, for their tearful reaction to him winning the 100 meter freestyle in Olympic record time, with his wife's eruption of emotion leading People to dub Meghan as their pick for the "Olympic gold medal for most celebratory spouse watching from halfway around the world in a pandemic". People not only recognized his wife, they also recognized Caeleb Dressel for his physique, naming him as their "Sexiest Olympian" for the 2020 Olympic Games.

In the evening of day six, Dressel tied the Olympic record in the 100 meter butterfly with a time of 50.39 in the prelims heats. This first Olympic record in the 100 meter butterfly Dressel set less than nine hours after setting the Olympic record in the 100 meter freestyle. In the second semifinal heat of the 100 meter butterfly on day seven, Dressel swam a 49.71 and broke the Olympic record of 50.31 Kristóf Milák set in the first semifinal heat. Later on day seven, Dressel swam three hundredths of a second off from setting a new Olympic record in the prelims of the 50 meter freestyle with his time of 21.32 and advanced to the semifinals ranked first.

On day eight, Dressel won the final of the 100 meter butterfly in a world record time of 49.45. In his second race, Dressel ranked first overall in the semifinals of the 50 meter freestyle with a time of 21.42 and advanced to the final. In his last race of the day, the final of the 4x100 meter mixed medley relay, Dressel finished in fifth place with his relay teammates Ryan Murphy, Lydia Jacoby, and Torri Huske. His world record and gold medal win in the 100 meter butterfly was chosen by Olympics.com as their number three moment in swimming at the 2020 Olympic Games.

On the final day, Dressel won the gold medal in 50 meter freestyle with an Olympic record time of 21.07. Later in the same session, Dressel won the gold medal in the 4x100 meter medley relay and set a new world record for the event of 3:26.78 in the final with his relay teammates Ryan Murphy, Michael Andrew, and Zach Apple.

By winning gold in five events at a single Olympic Games, Dressel became the fifth swimmer to achieve this feat. For the addition of the world record in the 4x100 meter medley relay to Dressel's list, he was awarded the Guinness World Record for "Most FINA world records held by an individual (current)" on August 11, 2021, for his then current 9 FINA world records. His gold medal-winning performances at the 2020 Olympic Games also earned him the 2021 James E. Sullivan Award.

After the Olympic Games, Dressel took a break from swimming for a few weeks due to mental health concerns, returning to competition in late August as part of the International Swimming League. In November 2021, Dressel amicably parted ways with his long-time coach Gregg Troy, regarding whom he has said "I owe him everything." Dressel moved under the direction of Anthony Nesty, who succeeded Troy as the head coach at the University of Florida in 2018.

==== International Swimming League ====
In the 2021 International Swimming League, Dressel was selected early on in the draft process as a protected swimmer to compete for the Cali Condors again. He started his competition in the 2021 season on August 28 in the second match of the season, and the first match of the season his team competed in, earning the second-most MVP points in the match with 93 points. For the fourth match of the regular season, Dressel earned match Most Valuable Player, MVP, honors with a total of 112.5 MVP points, which was over 50 points ahead of the next-highest scorer Kelsi Dahlia also of the Cali Condors. In match six, Dressel swam a personal best time of 1:51.14 in the 200 meter individual medley, finishing second only behind Daiya Seto of the Tokyo Frog Kings. His swim also registered Dressel as the second fastest American swimmer in the event, a slim second and a half slower than American Ryan Lochte who set the world record in the event at 1:49.63 in 2012. Partway through the regular season, in mid-September 2021, Dressel and team general manager Jason Lezak decided Dressel would withdraw from competing for the remainder of the regular season and return for the playoffs.

For the first match of the playoffs season, Dressel joined fellow Cali Condors teammate and Olympian Hali Flickinger in not partaking in match competition. For the fourth match of the playoffs season, Dressel was entered on the start lists for a number of events including the 50 meter freestyle where he entered to compete against Kyle Chalmers of London Roar. Come race time, Dressel placed third the 50 meter freestyle with a time of 21.04, finishing seven-hundredths of a second behind first-place finisher Kyle Chalmers and earning 6.0 points for his team. He swam the anchor leg of the 4x100 meter freestyle relay for his next race, splitting a 47.26 and helping the relay place third. In the 4x100 meter medley relay Dressel got his first win of the match, splitting the second fastest time, a 49.60, for the butterfly leg of the relay, faster than the third-fastest split of 50.03 by Kyle Chalmers and slower than the split of 48.83 by Tom Shields of LA Current. On the second and final day of match competition, Dressel won his first individual event of the playoffs season in the 100 meter individual medley with a time of 51.67 seconds that earned his team 10.0 points. In his final race of the match, the 4x100 meter mixed medley relay, Dressel helped his relay place fifth and earn 8.0 points for the Cali Condors.

Following his playoffs match four performances, Cali Condors team manager Jason Lezak made the executive decision to have Dressel sit out of the final playoffs match so Dressel could conserve energy for the final match. On the first day of the final match, Dressel helped set new Americas and American records in the 4×100 meter medley relay with Coleman Stewart (backstroke), Nic Fink (breaststroke), and Justin Ress (freestyle), splitting a time of 49.01 seconds for the butterfly leg of the relay to help achieve a time of 3:19.64. Dressel also won the 100 meter individual medley in a time of 50.74 seconds, earning 9 points for his team, and won the 50 meter butterfly skins competition with a time of 23.05 seconds in the final head-to-head competition against Tom Shields.

=== 2022 ===
==== International team trials ====
The 2022 USA Swimming International Team Trials were from April 26 to April 30 in Greensboro, North Carolina. Caeleb Dressel swam the 50 freestyle, the 100 freestyle, the 50 butterfly, and the 100 butterfly. He won all four of those events and is set to swim them at the world championships in Budapest, Hungary.

==== 2022 World Championships ====
2022 World Championships
Gold medal – first place	4×100 m freestyle	3:09.34
Gold medal – first place	50 m butterfly	22.57

On the first day of the 2022 World Championships, Dressel led-off the 4×100 meter freestyle relay in a time of 47.67 seconds, helping achieve the first relay gold medal of the Championships for the United States. The next day, he backed up the gold medal in the relay with a gold medal in the 50 meter butterfly, finishing first with a time of 22.57 seconds, which was over two-tenths of a second faster than silver medalist Nicholas Santos of Brazil.

On the fourth day of the world championships, Dressel swam the 100 meter freestyle in the prelims heats to achieve the second-fastest seed going into the semifinals. However, he decided to withdraw from further competition for health reasons.

=== 2025 ===
Caleb has teamed up with his college sprint coach, Stephen Jungbluth, in Jacksonville and has joined the Sporting Jax Aquatic Club.

== Results in major championships ==
Meet	50 free	100 free	50 fly	100 fly	4×50 free	4×100 free	4×200 free	4×50 medley	4×100 medley	4×50 mixed free	4×50 mixed medley	4×100 mixed free	4×100 mixed medley
WJ 2013	3rd place, bronze medalist(s)	1st place, gold medalist(s)			—N/a	2nd place, silver medalist(s)	3rd place, bronze medalist(s)	—N/a	DQ	—N/a	—N/a	2nd place, silver medalist(s)	3rd place, bronze medalist(s)
OG 2016		6th	—N/a		—N/a	1st place, gold medalist(s)		—N/a	(gold) ^{[a]}	—N/a	—N/a	—N/a	—N/a
WC 2017	1st place, gold medalist(s)	1st place, gold medalist(s)	4th	1st place, gold medalist(s)	—N/a	1st place, gold medalist(s)		—N/a	1st place, gold medalist(s)	—N/a	—N/a	1st place, gold medalist(s)	1st place, gold medalist(s)
PAC 2018	2nd place, silver medalist(s)	2nd place, silver medalist(s)	—N/a	1st place, gold medalist(s)	—N/a	DQ		—N/a	1st place, gold medalist(s)	—N/a	—N/a	—N/a	3rd place, bronze medalist(s)
SCW 2018	2nd place, silver medalist(s)	1st place, gold medalist(s)	DNS	2nd place, silver medalist(s)	1st place, gold medalist(s)	1st place, gold medalist(s)		2nd place, silver medalist(s)	1st place, gold medalist(s)	1st place, gold medalist(s)	1st place, gold medalist(s)	—N/a	—N/a
WC 2019	1st place, gold medalist(s)	1st place, gold medalist(s)	1st place, gold medalist(s)	1st place, gold medalist(s)	—N/a	1st place, gold medalist(s)		—N/a	2nd place, silver medalist(s)	—N/a	—N/a	1st place, gold medalist(s)	2nd place, silver medalist(s)
OG 2021	1st place, gold medalist(s)	1st place, gold medalist(s)	—N/a	1st place, gold medalist(s)	—N/a	1st place, gold medalist(s)		—N/a	1st place, gold medalist(s)	—N/a	—N/a	—N/a	5th
WC 2022		WD^{[b]}	1st place, gold medalist(s)		—N/a	1st place, gold medalist(s)		—N/a		—N/a	—N/a		
OG 2024	6th		—N/a	13th	—N/a	1st place, gold medalist(s)		—N/a	2nd place, silver medalist(s)	—N/a	—N/a	—N/a	(gold) ^{[a]}

^{a} Dressel swam only in the heats.
^{b} Dressel chose to withdraw from the 100 freestyle due to medical concerns.

== Personal bests ==
As of September 11, 2021

=== Long course meters (50 m pool) ===
Event	Time		Meet	Date	Note(s)
50 m freestyle	21.04		2019 World Championships	July 27, 2019	NR
50 m freestyle	21.04		2020 U.S. Olympic Trials	June 20, 2021	=NR
100 m freestyle	46.96		2019 World Championships	July 25, 2019	NR
200 m freestyle	1:46.63	h	2020 U.S. Olympic Trials	June 14, 2021	
50 m backstroke	25.95	h	2021 Atlanta Classic	May 15, 2021	
100 m backstroke	55.80	b	2017 Atlanta Classic	May 13, 2017	
50 m breaststroke	27.89		2018 Mel Zajac Jr. International	June 3, 2018	
100 m breaststroke	1:01.22		2019 Atlanta Classic	May 17, 2019	
50 m butterfly	22.35		2019 World Championships	July 22, 2019	AM
100 m butterfly	49.45		2020 Summer Olympics	July 31, 2021	WR
200 m butterfly	1:56.29		2019 Atlanta Classic	May 18, 2019	
200 m individual medley	1:59.97	b	2019 Toyota U.S. Open Championships	December 5, 2019	

Legend: WR – World record; AM – Americas record; NR – American record; e – equalled existing record; = – Equal record;
Records not set in finals: h – heat; sf – semifinal; r – relay 1st leg; rh – relay heat 1st leg; b – B final; † – en route to final mark; so – swim-off; tt – time trial

=== Short course meters (25 m pool) ===
Event	Time	Meet	Date	Note(s)
50 m freestyle	20.16	2020 International Swimming League	November 21, 2020	NR, Former WR
100 m freestyle	45.08	2020 International Swimming League	November 22, 2020	Former AM
50 m breaststroke	26.01	2020 International Swimming League	November 22, 2020	
50 m butterfly	22.04	2020 International Swimming League	November 16, 2020	Former NR
100 m butterfly	47.78	2020 International Swimming League	November 21, 2020	AM, Former WR
100 m individual medley	49.28	2020 International Swimming League	November 22, 2020	WR
200 m individual medley	1:51.14	2021 International Swimming League	September 11, 2021	

Legend: WR – World record; AM – Americas record; NR – American record; e – equalled existing record; = – Equal record;
Records not set in finals: h – heat; sf – semifinal; r – relay 1st leg; rh – relay heat 1st leg; b – B final; † – en route to final mark; so – swim-off; tt – time trial

=== Short course yards (25 y pool) ===
Event	Time	Meet	Date	Note(s)
50 yd freestyle	17.63	2018 NCAA Division I Championships	March 22, 2018	NR
100 yd freestyle	39.90	2018 NCAA Division I Championships	March 24, 2018	NR
100 yd breaststroke	50.03	2018 SEC Swimming & Diving Championships	February 17, 2018	Former NR
100 yd butterfly	42.80	2018 NCAA Division I Championships	March 23, 2018	NR
200 yd individual medley	1:38.13	2018 SEC Swimming & Diving Championships	February 15, 2018	Former NR

Legend: NR – American record; e – equalled existing record;
Records not set in finals: h – heat; sf – semifinal; r – relay 1st leg; rh – relay heat 1st leg; b – B final; † – en route to final mark; so – swim-off; tt – time trial

== World records ==
=== Long course meters (50 m pool) ===
No.	Event	Time		Meet	Location	Date	Status
1	4×100 m mixed medley relay	3:38.56		2017 World Championships	Budapest, Hungary	Jul 26, 2017	Former
2	4×100 m mixed freestyle relay	3:19.60		2017 World Championships	Budapest, Hungary	Jul 29, 2017	Former
3	100 m butterfly	49.50	sf	2019 World Championships	Gwangju, South Korea	Jul 26, 2019	Former
4	4×100 m mixed freestyle relay (2)	3:19.40		2019 World Championships	Gwangju, South Korea	Jul 27, 2019	Former
5	100 m butterfly (2)	49.45		2020 Summer Olympics	Tokyo, Japan	Jul 31, 2021	Current
6	4×100 m medley relay	3:26.78		2020 Summer Olympics	Tokyo, Japan	Aug 1, 2021	Current

Legend: e – equalled existing record;
Records not set in finals: h – heat; sf – semifinal; r – relay 1st leg; rh – relay heat 1st leg; b – B final; † – en route to final mark; so – swim-off; tt – time trial

=== Short course meters (25 m pool) ===
No.	Event	Time	Meet	Location	Date	Status
1	4×100 m freestyle relay	3:03.03	2018 World Championships (25m)	Hangzhou, China	Dec 11, 2018	Former
2	4×50 m mixed freestyle relay	1:27.89	2018 World Championships (25m)	Hangzhou, China	Dec 12, 2018	Former
3	4×50 m mixed medley relay	1:36.40	2018 World Championships (25m)	Hangzhou, China	Dec 13, 2018	Former
4	4×50 m freestyle relay	1:21.80	2018 World Championships (25m)	Hangzhou, China	Dec 14, 2018	Current
5	50 m freestyle	20.24	2019 International Swimming League	Las Vegas, Nevada	Dec 20, 2019	Former
6	100 m individual medley	49.88	2020 International Swimming League	Budapest, Hungary	Nov 16, 2020	Former
7	100 m butterfly	47.78	2020 International Swimming League	Budapest, Hungary	Nov 21, 2020	Former
8	50 m freestyle (2)	20.16	2020 International Swimming League	Budapest, Hungary	Nov 21, 2020	Former
9	100 m individual medley (2)	49.28	2020 International Swimming League	Budapest, Hungary	Nov 22, 2020	Current

== National records ==
=== Long course meters (50 m pool) ===
No.	Event	Time		Meet	Location	Date	Status
1	50 m butterfly	22.76	sf	2017 World Championships	Budapest, Hungary	July 23, 2017	Former
2	100 m freestyle	47.26		2017 World Championships	Budapest, Hungary	July 23, 2017	Former
3	100 m freestyle (2)	47.17		2017 World Championships	Budapest, Hungary	July 27, 2017	Former
4	50 m freestyle	21.15		2017 World Championships	Budapest, Hungary	July 29, 2017	Former
5	50 m butterfly (2)	22.57	sf	2019 World Championships	Gwangju, South Korea	July 21, 2019	Former
6	50 m butterfly (3)	22.35		2019 World Championships	Gwangju, South Korea	July 22, 2019	Current
7	100 m freestyle (3)	46.96		2019 World Championships	Gwangju, South Korea	July 25, 2019	Former
8	100 m butterfly	49.50	sf	2019 World Championships	Gwangju, South Korea	July 26, 2019	Former
9	50 m freestyle (2)	21.04		2019 World Championships	Gwangju, South Korea	July 27, 2019	Current
10	100 m butterfly (2)	49.45		2020 Summer Olympics	Tokyo, Japan	July 31, 2021	Current

Legend: e – equalled existing record;
Records not set in finals: h – heat; sf – semifinal; r – relay 1st leg; rh – relay heat 1st leg; b – B final; † – en route to final mark; so – swim-off; tt – time trial

=== Short course meters (25 m pool) ===
No.	Event	Time		Meet	Location	Date	Status
1	50 m freestyle	20.43		2018 World Championships (25m)	Hangzhou, China	Dec 14, 2018	Former
2	100 m freestyle	45.62		2018 World Championships (25m)	Hangzhou, China	Dec 16, 2018	Former
3	50 m butterfly	22.21		2019 International Swimming League	Las Vegas, Nevada	Nov 17, 2019	Former
4	50 m freestyle (2)	20.24		2019 International Swimming League	Las Vegas, Nevada	Dec 20, 2019	Former
5	100 m freestyle (2)	45.22		2019 International Swimming League	Las Vegas, Nevada	Dec 21, 2019	Former
6	50 m butterfly (2)	22.06		2019 International Swimming League	Las Vegas, Nevada	Dec 21, 2019	Former
7	100 m individual medley	50.48		2020 International Swimming League	Budapest, Hungary	Nov 10, 2020	Former
8	50 m butterfly (3)	22.06	=	2020 International Swimming League	Budapest, Hungary	Nov 10, 2020	Former
9	100 m freestyle (3)	45.20		2020 International Swimming League	Budapest, Hungary	Nov 16, 2020	Former
10	100 m individual medley (2)	49.88		2020 International Swimming League	Budapest, Hungary	Nov 16, 2020	Former
11	50 m butterfly (4)	22.04		2020 International Swimming League	Budapest, Hungary	Nov 16, 2020	Former
12	100 m butterfly	47.78		2020 International Swimming League	Budapest, Hungary	Nov 21, 2020	Current
13	50 m freestyle (3)	20.16		2020 International Swimming League	Budapest, Hungary	Nov 21, 2020	Current
14	100 m freestyle (4)	45.18	r	2020 International Swimming League	Budapest, Hungary	Nov 21, 2020	Former
15	100 m freestyle (5)	45.08		2020 International Swimming League	Budapest, Hungary	Nov 22, 2020	Former
16	100 m individual medley (3)	49.28		2020 International Swimming League	Budapest, Hungary	Nov 22, 2020	Current

Legend: e – equalled existing record; = – Equal record;
Records not set in finals: h – heat; sf – semifinal; r – relay 1st leg; rh – relay heat 1st leg; b – B final; † – en route to final mark; so – swim-off; tt – time trial

=== Short course yards (25 y pool) ===
No.	Event	Time		Meet	Location	Date	Status
1	50 yd freestyle	18.39	h	2016 SEC Swimming & Diving Championships	Columbia, Missouri	February 17, 2016	Former
2	50 yd freestyle (2)	18.23		2016 SEC Swimming & Diving Championships	Columbia, Missouri	February 17, 2016	Former
3	100 yd freestyle	41.07		2016 SEC Swimming & Diving Championships	Columbia, Missouri	February 20, 2016	Former
4	50 yd freestyle (3)	18.20		2016 NCAA Division I Championships	Atlanta, Georgia	March 24, 2016	Former
5	100 yd freestyle (2)	40.46		2016 NCAA Division I Championships	Atlanta, Georgia	March 26, 2016	Former
6	100 yd freestyle (3)	40.00		2017 NCAA Division I Championships	Indianapolis, Indiana	March 25, 2017	Former
7	100 yd butterfly	43.58		2017 NCAA Division I Championships	Indianapolis, Indiana	March 25, 2017	Former
8	200 yd individual medley	1:38.13		2018 SEC Swimming & Diving Championships	College Station, Texas	February 15, 2018	Former
9	100 yd breaststroke	50.03		2018 SEC Swimming & Diving Championships	College Station, Texas	February 17, 2018	Former
10	50 yd freestyle (4)	18.11	h	2018 NCAA Division I Championships	Minneapolis, Minnesota	March 22, 2018	Former
11	50 yd freestyle (5)	17.81	r	2018 NCAA Division I Championships	Minneapolis, Minnesota	March 22, 2018	Former
12	50 yd freestyle (6)	17.63		2018 NCAA Division I Championships	Minneapolis, Minnesota	March 22, 2018	Current
13	100 yd butterfly (2)	42.80		2018 NCAA Division I Championships	Minneapolis, Minnesota	March 23, 2018	Current
14	100 yd freestyle (4)	39.90		2018 NCAA Division I Championships	Minneapolis, Minnesota	March 24, 2018	Current

Legend: e – equalled existing record;
Records not set in finals: h – heat; sf – semifinal; r – relay 1st leg; rh – relay heat 1st leg; b – B final; † – en route to final mark; so – swim-off; tt – time trial

== Guinness World Records ==
- "Most FINA world records held by an individual (current)", August 11, 2021: 9 FINA world records in swimming.

== Awards and honors ==
- ESPY Award for Best Olympian, Men's Sports: 2022
- James E. Sullivan Award: 2021
- People, Sexiest Olympian: 2021
- FINA, Top 10 Moments: 2020 Summer Olympics (#6)
- Olympics.com, Top 5 Moments: Swimming at the 2020 Summer Olympics (#3)
- Sports Illustrated Athlete of the Year (male): 2021
- Sports Illustrated's Fittest 50: 2019 (#22), 2020 (#10), 2021 (#7), 2022 (#3)
- 2019 FINA World Championships: Best Male Swimmer
- 2017 FINA World Championships: Best Male Swimmer
- FINA Athlete of the Year in Swimming (male): 2017, 2019, 2021
- USA Swimming, Athlete of the Year: 2017, 2019, 2021
- Golden Goggle Award Male Athlete of the Year: 2017, 2019, 2021
- Golden Goggle Award Male Race of the Year (100 meter butterfly): 2017, 2019
- Golden Goggle Award Relay Performance of the Year: 2016, 2018, 2021
- Swimming World World Swimmer of the Year (male): 2017, 2019, 2021
- Swimming World American Swimmer of the Year (male): 2017, 2019, 2021
- SwimSwam Swammy Award Swimmer of the Year (male): 2017, 2019, 2020, 2021
- SwimSwam Top 100 (Men's): 2021 (#1), 2022 (#1)
- SwimSwam Swammy Award, NCAA Swimmer of the Year (male): 2017, 2018
- Southeastern Conference (SEC), Male Swimmer of the Year: 2015–2016, 2016–2017, 2017—2018
- College Swimming & Diving Coaches Association of America (CSCAA), Division-1 Swimmer of the Year (Men's): 2015–2016, 2016–2017, 2017—2018
- SwimSwam Swammy Award, Age Group Swimmer of the Year 17—18 (male): 2013
- SwimSwam Swammy Award, SwimSwam Buzz Award: 2013

== Personal life ==
=== Swim analysis ===
Dressel began posting videos deconstructing some of his past swims to his YouTube channel in July 2020. In the first video, he analyzed one of his swims where he set a new world record in the 100-meter butterfly. He has also shared critique of his past races and swims with SwimSwam. Leading up to the 2020 Summer Olympics, he ventured into analyses of swimming in pop culture. Dressel provided his perspective to GQ on swimming scenes from various movies including scenes featuring survival swimming (such as in Cast Away and Kingsman: The Secret Service) and competitive swimming (as in Pride).

=== Sponsorships and collaborations ===
On July 19, 2018, Dressel turned professional by signing a sponsorship deal with swimwear brand Speedo. In September 2020, SPIRE Institute and Academy announced collaborations with Dressel for providing support to students of SPIRE through various avenues such as curriculum development, training, and facilities design. Leading up to the 2020 Summer Olympics, one of Dressel's sponsors, Toyota, specially designed a vehicle inspired by his tattoos.

=== Marriage ===
In 2013, Dressel started a romantic relationship with his future wife, Meghan, a child counselor and former breaststroker who competed collegiately for Florida State University, and in 2019 they were engaged. In 2020, during the COVID-19 pandemic, planning the wedding was one way Dressel stayed busy during quarantine, as was hiking a 60-mile portion of the Appalachian Trail. They married on Valentine's Day weekend, February 13, 2021, in their shared home state of Florida. The couple welcomed a son, August, in February 2024 and a daughter, Josie, in June 2025.

=== Religion ===
He was raised Christian in his youth and his faith grew while in college. His large eagle tattoo was inspired by the Bible verse Isaiah 40:31, which he shared with Sports Illustrated in 2016 is his favorite Bible verse. During his senior year of high school, Dressel gave up swimming for a time because of his struggle with "mental demons", speaking about that period in his life Dressel said:

Coming out of that, I started swimming again and really just put all my trust in God and knowing that he's going to take care of everything for me, good or bad. I really learned a lot, and I really learned to see the light at the end of the tunnel and trust what God is doing, whether it be a rough point in your life or a top pinnacle in your life. You've just got to take pauses and really trust what he's doing.

== See also ==
- List of world records in swimming
- World record progression 100 metres butterfly
- World record progression 50 metres freestyle
- World record progression 100 metres individual medley
- World record progression 4 × 100 metres medley relay
- List of multiple Olympic gold medalists
- List of people from Florida
- Dressel
- Florida Gators swimming and diving
- Speedo
- NCAA Division I men's swimming and diving championships
- Meet History, Rankings, Team and LSC Records

Records
Preceded by (United States) Michael Phelps	Men's 100-meter butterfly world record holder (long course); July 26, 2019 –	Succeeded by Incumbent
Preceded by (France) Florent Manaudou	Men's 50-meter freestyle world record holder (short course); December 20, 2019 –December 14, 2024	Succeeded by (Cayman Islands) Jordan Crooks
Preceded by (South Africa) Chad le Clos	Men's 100-meter butterfly world record holder (short course); November 21, 2020 –December 14, 2024	Succeeded by (Switzerland) Noè Ponti
Preceded by (Russia) Vladimir Morozov	Men's 100-meter individual medley world record holder (short course); November 16, 2020 –	Succeeded by Incumbent
Awards
Preceded by (United States) Michael Phelps (South Africa) Chad le Clos	FINA Swimmer of the Year; 2017; 2019, 2021	Succeeded by (South Africa) Chad le Clos (Romania) David Popovici
Preceded by (United States) Michael Phelps (United Kingdom) Adam Peaty	Swimming World; World Swimmer of the Year; 2017; 2019, 2021	Succeeded by (United Kingdom) Adam Peaty (Romania) David Popovici
Preceded by Michael Phelps; Chase Kalisz	American Swimmer of the Year; 2017; 2019, 2021	Succeeded by Chase Kalisz; Bobby Finke
