= 100 metres individual medley =

The 100 metres individual medley is an event in competitive swimming. It consists of one 25 m lap of each stroke (butterfly, backstroke, breaststroke, and freestyle), and as such is only recognized in short course (25 m) pools. World records are ratified by World Aquatics (formerly FINA). The current world record holders are the US’ Caeleb Dressel and Gretchen Walsh. The men's and women's events have been contested at the World Aquatics Swimming Championships (25m) since 1999; the current world champions are Switzerland's Noè Ponti, and Walsh.

== World record progression ==
=== Men ===
#	Time		Name	Nationality	Date	Meet	Location	Ref
1	54.66		Josef Hladky	Germany	16 March 1991	World Cup	Bonn, Germany	
2	53.78		Jani Sievinen	Finland	21 November 1992	European Championships	Espoo, Finland	
2	53.78	=	Jani Sievinen	Finland	24 January 1996	World Cup	Sheffield, United Kingdom	
4	53.10		Jani Sievinen	Finland	30 January 1996	World Cup	Malmö, Sweden	
5	52.79		Neil Walker	United States	18 March 2000	World Championships	Athens, Greece	
6	52.63	sf	Peter Mankoč	Slovenia	15 December 2001	European Championships	Antwerp, Belgium	
7	52.58		Thomas Rupprath	Germany	25 January 2003	World Cup	Berlin, Germany	
8	52.51		Roland Schoeman	South Africa	18 January 2005	World Cup	Stockholm, Sweden	
9	52.11		Ryk Neethling	South Africa	22 January 2005	World Cup	Berlin, Germany	
10	52.01		Ryk Neethling	South Africa	26 January 2005	World Cup	Moscow, Russia	
11	51.52		Ryk Neethling	South Africa	11 February 2005	World Cup	East Meadow, NY, United States	
12	51.25	sf	Ryan Lochte	United States	12 April 2008	World Championships	Manchester, United Kingdom	
13	51.15		Ryan Lochte	United States	13 April 2008	World Championships	Manchester, United Kingdom	
14	50.95	h	Sergey Fesikov	Russia	14 November 2009	World Cup	Berlin, Germany	
15	50.76	sf	Peter Mankoč	Slovenia	12 December 2009	European Championships	Istanbul, Turkey	
16	50.71	sf	Ryan Lochte	United States	15 December 2012	World Championships	Istanbul, Turkey	
17	50.66		Markus Deibler	Germany	7 December 2014	World Championships	Doha, Qatar	
18	50.60		Vladimir Morozov	Russia	26 August 2016	World Cup	Chartres, France	
19	50.30		Vladimir Morozov	Russia	30 August 2016	World Cup	Berlin, Germany	
20	50.26		Vladimir Morozov	Russia	28 September 2018	World Cup	Eindhoven, Netherlands	
20	50.26	=	Vladimir Morozov	Russia	9 November 2018	World Cup	Tokyo, Japan	
22	49.88		Caeleb Dressel	United States	16 November 2020	International Swimming League	Budapest, Hungary	
23	49.28		Caeleb Dressel	United States	22 November 2020	International Swimming League	Budapest, Hungary	

Legend: # – Record awaiting ratification by FINA; e – equalled existing record;
Records not set in finals: h – heat; sf – semifinal; r – relay 1st leg; rh – relay heat 1st leg; b – B final; † – en route to final mark; so – swim-off; tt – time trial

=== Women ===
#	Time		Name	Nationality	Date	Meet	Location	Ref
WB	1:02.75		Marion Zoller	Germany	30 March 1991	World Cup	Sheffield, Great Britain	
1	1:01.61		Lin Li	China	29 February 1992	World Cup	Palma de Mallorca, Spain	
2	1:01.03		Louise Karlsson	Sweden	22 November 1992	European Championships	Espoo, Finland	
2	1:01.03	=	Louise Karlsson	Sweden	26 January 1997	World Cup	Malmö, Sweden	
4	1:00.60		Hu Xiaowen	China	26 February 1998	World Cup	Beijing, China	
5	1:00.43		Martina Moravcová	Slovakia	12 December 1998	European Championships	Sheffield, United Kingdom	
6	1:00.41		Jenny Thompson	United States	16 January 1999	World Cup	Sydney, Australia	
7	1:00.35	h	Martina Moravcová	Slovakia	2 April 1999	World Championships	Hong Kong, China	
8	59.30	h	Jenny Thompson	United States	2 April 1999	World Championships	Hong Kong, China	
9	58.80		Natalie Coughlin	United States	23 November 2002	World Cup	East Meadow, NY, United States	
10	58.54		Emily Seebohm	Australia	10 August 2009	Australian Championships	Hobart, Australia	
11	58.51	h	Therese Alshammar	Sweden	17 October 2009	World Cup	Durban, South Africa	
12	58.40		Zhao Jing	China	11 November 2009	World Cup	Stockholm, Sweden	
13	57.74		Hinkelien Schreuder	Netherlands	15 November 2009	World Cup	Berlin, Germany	
14	57.73	h	Katinka Hosszú	Hungary	8 August 2013	World Cup	Eindhoven, Netherlands	
15	57.50		Katinka Hosszú	Hungary	8 August 2013	World Cup	Eindhoven, Netherlands	
16	57.45	h	Katinka Hosszú	Hungary	11 August 2013	World Cup	Berlin, Germany	
17	57.25	h	Katinka Hosszú	Hungary	28 August 2014	World Cup	Doha, Qatar	
18	56.86	h	Katinka Hosszú	Hungary	1 September 2014	World Cup	Dubai, United Arab Emirates	
19	56.70		Katinka Hosszú	Hungary	5 December 2014	World Championships	Doha, Qatar	
20	56.67		Katinka Hosszú	Hungary	4 December 2015	European Championships	Netanya, Israel	
21	56.51		Katinka Hosszú	Hungary	7 August 2017	World Cup	Berlin, Germany	
22	55.98	tt	Gretchen Walsh	United States	18 October 2024	Florida vs Virginia Dual Meet	Charlottesville, United States	
23	55.71	sf	Gretchen Walsh	United States	12 December 2024	World Championships	Budapest, Hungary	
24	55.11		Gretchen Walsh	United States	13 December 2024	World Championships	Budapest, Hungary	

Legend: # – Record awaiting ratification by FINA; e – equalled existing record;
Records not set in finals: h – heat; sf – semifinal; r – relay 1st leg; rh – relay heat 1st leg; b – B final; † – en route to final mark; so – swim-off; tt – time trial

== All-time top 25 ==
Tables show data for two definitions of "Top 25" - the top 25 100 m individual medley times and the top 25 athletes:
- denotes top performance for athletes in the top 25 100 m individual medley times
- denotes lesser performances, still in the top 25 100 m individual medley times, by repeat athletes
- denotes top performance (only) for other top 25 athletes who fall outside the top 25 100 m individual medley times

=== Men ===
- Correct as of November 2026

Ath.#	Perf.#	Time	Athlete	Nation	Date	Place	Ref.
1	1	49.28	Caeleb Dressel	United States	22 November 2020	Budapest	
	2	49.88	Dressel #2		16 November 2020	Budapest	
2	3	49.92	Léon Marchand	France	31 October 2024	Singapore	
3	4	50.23	Egor Kornev	Russia	8 November 2026	Saint Petersburg	
4	5	50.26	Vladimir Morozov	Russia	28 September 2018	Eindhoven	
4	5	50.26	Vladimir Morozov	Russia	9 November 2018	Tokyo	
5	7	50.28	Shaine Casas	United States	23 October 2025	Toronto	
	8	50.30	Morozov #3		30 August 2016	Berlin	
	9	50.31	Morozov #4		15 November 2018	Singapore	
	10	50.32	Morozov #5		4 October 2018	Budapest	
	11	50.33	Morozov #6		29 October 2016	Hong Kong	
6	11	50.33	Noè Ponti	Switzerland	13 December 2024	Budapest	
	13	50.34	Dressel #3		29 October 2026	Westmont	
	14	50.36	Morozov #7		11 November 2017	Beijing	
	15	50.39	Ponti #2		31 October 2024	Singapore	
	16	50.43	Ponti #3		12 December 2024	Budapest	
	17	50.45	Casas #2		17 October 2025	Westmont	
	18	50.48	Dressel #4		10 November 2020	Budapest	
	19	50.49	Morozov #8		18 November 2017	Singapore	
	20	50.52	Ponti #4		4 December 2025	Lublin	
7	21	50.53	Maxime Grousset	France	4 December 2025	Lublin	
	22	50.55	Morozov #9		25 October 2016	Tokyo	
	23	50.56	Grousset #2		23 October 2025	Taverny	
8	23	50.56	Hubert Kós	Hungary	23 October 2025	Toronto	
	25	50.60	Morozov #10		26 August 2016	Chartres	
9		50.63	Kliment Kolesnikov	Russia	14 December 2018	Hangzhou	
10		50.66	Markus Deibler	Germany	7 December 2014	Doha	
11		50.71	Ryan Lochte	United States	15 December 2012	Istanbul	
12		50.76	Peter Mankoč	Slovenia	12 December 2009	Istanbul	
13		50.95	Sergei Fesikov	Russia	14 November 2009	Berlin	
13		50.95	Marco Orsi	Italy	7 November 2021	Kazan	
15		50.96	Florent Manaudou	France	7 December 2013	Dijon	
16		50.97	Thomas Ceccon	Italy	16 December 2022	Melbourne	
17		51.05	Gerhard Zandberg	South Africa	14 November 2009	Berlin	
17		51.05	Javier Acevedo	Canada	16 December 2022	Melbourne	
17		51.05	Finlay Knox	Canada	23 October 2025	Toronto	
17		51.05	Luke Barr	United States	8 October 2026	Tashkent	
21		51.06	Kosuke Makino	Japan	10 October 2026	Saga	
22		51.07	Grant House	United States	17 October 2025	Westmont	
23		51.11	Bernhard Reitshammer	Austria	13 December 2024	Budapest	
24		51.14	Marcin Cieślak	Poland	16 November 2020	Budapest	
24		51.14	Emre Sakçı	Turkey	23 December 2023	Istanbul	
24		51.14	Duncan Scott	Great Britain	18 October 2024	Shanghai	

=== Women ===
- Correct as of October 2026

Ath.#	Perf.#	Time	Athlete	Nation	Date	Place	Ref.
1	1	55.11	Gretchen Walsh	United States	13 December 2024	Budapest	
	2	55.71	Walsh #2		12 December 2024	Budapest	
	3	55.77	Walsh #3		17 October 2025	Westmont	
	4	55.91	Walsh #4		10 October 2025	Carmel	
	5	55.98	Walsh #5		18 October 2024	Charlottesville	
	6	55.99	Walsh #6		23 October 2025	Toronto	
	7	56.06	Walsh #7		12 December 2024	Budapest	
2	8	56.18	Marrit Steenbergen	Netherlands	8 October 2026	Tashkent	
	9	56.26	Steenbergen #2		4 December 2025	Lublin	
3	10	56.34	Kate Douglass	United States	10 October 2025	Carmel	
	11	56.42	Douglass #2		17 October 2025	Westmont	
	12	56.49	Douglass #3		13 December 2024	Budapest	
4	13	56.51	Katinka Hosszú	Hungary	7 August 2017	Berlin	
	14	56.54	Steenbergen #3		16 October 2026	Astana	
	15	56.57	Douglass #4		31 October 2024	Singapore	
	16	56.58	Walsh #8		29 October 2026	Westmont	
	17	56.67	Hosszú #2		4 December 2015	Netanya	
5	17	56.67	Béryl Gastaldello	France	13 December 2024	Budapest	
6	19	56.68	Roos Vanotterdijk	Belgium	8 October 2026	Tashkent	
	20	56.70	Hosszú #3		5 December 2014	Doha	
	21	56.75	Hosszú #4		14 December 2017	Copenhagen	
	22	56.80	Vanotterdijk #2		4 December 2025	Lublin	
	23	56.82	Steenbergen #4		1 October 2026	Baku	
	24	56.84	Vanotterdijk #3		1 October 2026	Baku	
	25	56.86	Hosszú #5		1 September 2014	Dubai	
7		56.99	Yu Yiting	China	1 October 2026	Baku	
8		57.04	Mary-Sophie Harvey	Canada	13 December 2024	Budapest	
9		57.10	Sarah Sjöström	Sweden	2 August 2017	Moscow	
10		57.17	Anastasia Gorbenko	Israel	4 December 2025	Lublin	
11		57.47	Charlotte Bonnet	France	7 December 2023	Otopeni	
12		57.53	Alicia Coutts	Australia	10 November 2013	Tokyo	
12		57.53	Beata Nelson	United States	31 October 2024	Singapore	
14		57.59	Siobhan-Marie O'Connor	Great Britain	3 December 2015	Netanya	
14		57.59	Maria Kameneva	Russia	6 December 2019	Glasgow	
14		57.59	Anastasiya Shkurdai	Belarus	22 November 2020	Budapest	
17		57.68	Rūta Meilutytė	Lithuania	14 December 2013	Herning	
17		57.68	Louise Hansson	Sweden	16 December 2022	Melbourne	
19		57.69	Rebecca Meder	South Africa	12 December 2024	Budapest	
19		57.69	Tessa Giele	Netherlands	13 December 2024	Budapest	
21		57.74	Hinkelien Schreuder	Netherlands	15 November 2009	Berlin	
22		57.75	Rikako Ikee	Japan	15 November 2017	Tokyo	
23		57.76	Kaylee McKeown	Australia	18 October 2024	Shanghai	
24		57.77	Runa Imai	Japan	14 December 2018	Hangzhou	
25		57.80	Kayla Sanchez	Canada	21 December 2018	Lausanne	

== World champions ==
=== Men ===
Edition	Winner	Time	Notes	Ref.
Hong Kong 1999	Jani Sievinen (FIN)	54.18	CR	
(Greece) Athens 2000	Neil Walker (USA)	52.79	WR	
(Russia) Moscow 2002	Peter Mankoč (SLO)	52.90		
(United States) Indianapolis 2004	Peter Mankoč (SLO)	52.66	CR	
(China) Shanghai 2006	Ryk Neethling (RSA)	52.42	CR	
(United Kingdom) Manchester 2008	Ryan Lochte (USA)	51.15	WR	
(United Arab Emirates) Dubai 2010	Ryan Lochte (USA)	50.86	(Note: Ryan Lochte set a championship record of 50.81 in the semifinals.)	
(Turkey) Istanbul 2012	Ryan Lochte (USA)	51.21	(Note: Ryan Lochte set a world record of 50.71 in the semifinals.)	
(Qatar) Doha 2014	Markus Deibler (GER)	50.66	WR	
(Canada) Windsor 2016	Michael Andrew (USA)	51.84		
(China) Hangzhou 2018	Kliment Kolesnikov (RUS)	50.63	CR	
(United Arab Emirates) Abu Dhabi 2021	Kliment Kolesnikov (RSF)	51.09		
(Australia) Melbourne 2022	Thomas Ceccon (ITA)	50.97		
(Hungary) Budapest 2024	Noè Ponti (SUI)	50.33	CR	

=== Women ===
Edition	Winner	Time	Notes	Ref.
Hong Kong 1999	Martina Moravcová (SVK)	1:00.20	(Note: Jenny Thompson set a world record of 59.30 in the heats.)	
(Greece) Athens 2000	Martina Moravcová (SVK)	59.71		
(Russia) Moscow 2002	Martina Moravcová (SVK)	59.91		
(United States) Indianapolis 2004	Brooke Hanson (AUS)	1:00.01		
(China) Shanghai 2006	Brooke Hanson (AUS)	1:00.16		
(United Kingdom) Manchester 2008	Shayne Reese (AUS)	59.58		
(United Arab Emirates) Dubai 2010	Ariana Kukors (USA)	58.95	(Note: Ariana Kukors set a championship record of 58.65 in the semifinals.)	
(Turkey) Istanbul 2012	Katinka Hosszú (HUN)	58.49	CR	
(Qatar) Doha 2014	Katinka Hosszú (HUN)	56.70	WR	
(Canada) Windsor 2016	Katinka Hosszú (HUN)	57.24		
(China) Hangzhou 2018	Katinka Hosszú (HUN)	57.26		
(United Arab Emirates) Abu Dhabi 2021	Anastasia Gorbenko (ISR)	57.80		
(Australia) Melbourne 2022	Marrit Steenbergen (NED)	57.53		
(Hungary) Budapest 2024	Gretchen Walsh (USA)	55.11	WR	
