= Tamsin Cook =

Australian swimmer (born 1998)

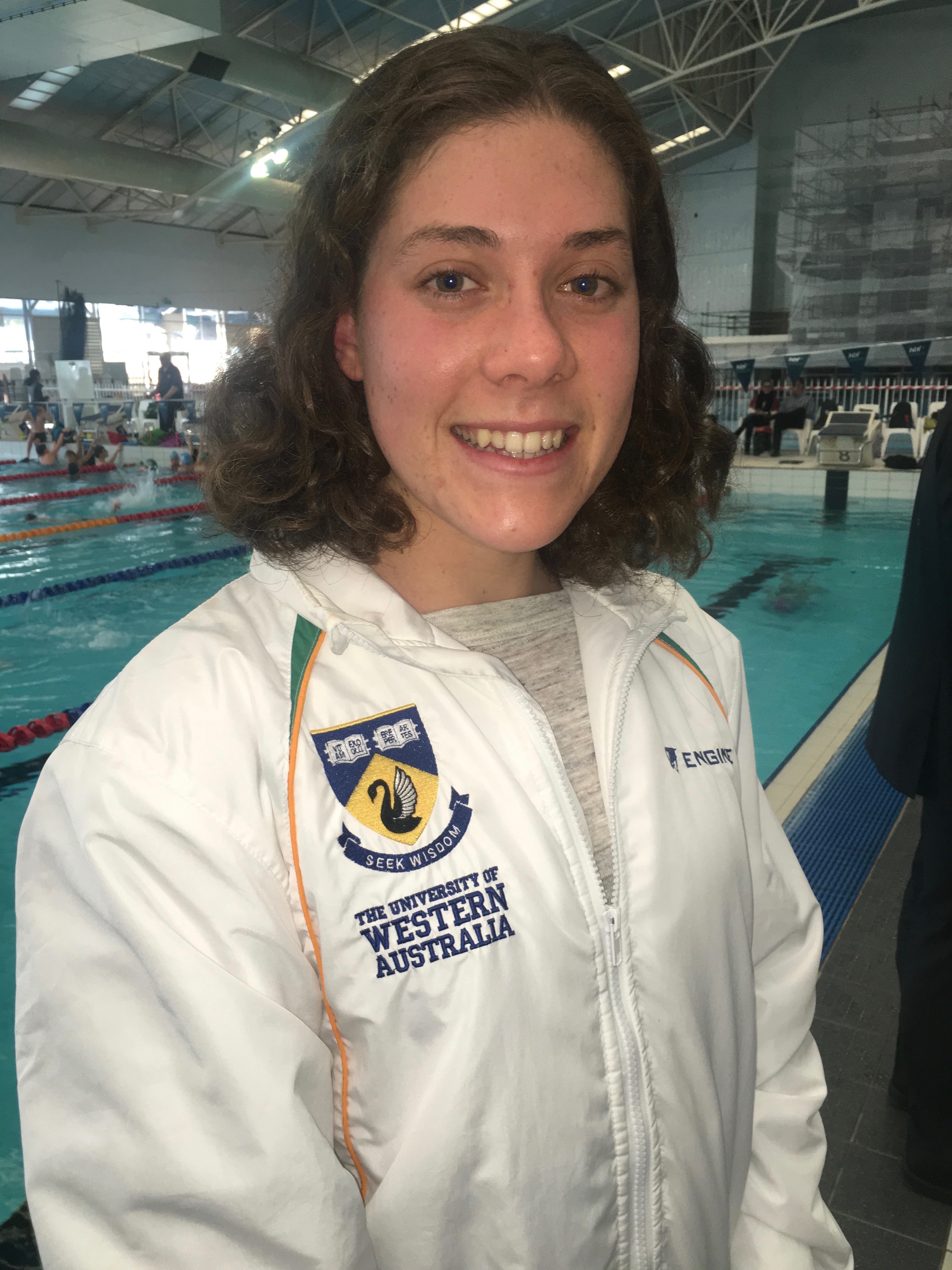
- Portrait of Cook at HBF Stadium taken on 13 July 2016

Personal information
- National team: Australia
- Born: 25 December 1998 (age 27) Cape Town, South Africa
- Height: 1.7 m (5 ft 7 in)
- Weight: 61 kg (134 lb)

Sport
- Sport: Swimming
- Strokes: Freestyle
- Club: UWA West Coast
- Coach: Mick Pelfrey
Medal record
Women's swimming
Representing Australia
Olympic Games
Silver medal – second place	2016 Rio de Janeiro	4×200 m freestyle
Bronze medal – third place	2020 Tokyo	4×200 m freestyle
Oceanian Championships
Gold medal – first place	2014 Auckland	400 m freestyle
Gold medal – first place	2014 Auckland	4×200 m freestyle
Silver medal – second place	2014 Auckland	200 m butterfly
World Junior Championships
Gold medal – first place	2015 Singapore	400 m freestyle
Gold medal – first place	2015 Singapore	4×200 m freestyle
Silver medal – second place	2015 Singapore	200 m butterfly
Junior Pan Pacific Championships
Silver medal – second place	2014 Maui	400 m freestyle
Silver medal – second place	2014 Maui	4×200 m freestyle

Tamsin Cook (born 25 December 1998) is an Australian swimmer and the former junior world champion in the 400-meter freestyle. After a neck injury in 2018 she retired from swimming, but returned in 2020 and qualified for the 2020 Summer Olympics in Tokyo.

== Junior career ==
Cook participated in the 2014 Junior Pan Pacific Swimming Championships in Maui, Hawaii.

She won the gold medal in the 400 meter freestyle at the 2015 FINA World Junior Swimming Championships in Singapore in a new Championships record. She also broke the Championships record in the 200 meter freestyle with her lead-off leg in the 4 × 200 m freestyle relay final. In that race she and her teammates broke the junior world record. Cook also won a silver medal in the 200 meter butterfly.

In October 2015, Cook was named Western Australian Institute of Sport's Junior Athlete of the Year. The following year, she was named WAIS Junior Athlete of the Year, for the second year defeating other young athletes including diver Nikita Hains.

== Senior career ==
In April 2016, Cook qualified for the 2016 Summer Olympics in Rio de Janeiro in the 400-meter freestyle, which was her first Olympics. She finished 6th in the final.

After a neck injury disqualified her from the 2018 Commonwealth Games, she retired from swimming in June 2018 to focus on her university studies.

In 2020 Tamsin made a return to the pool, and subsequently qualified for the Tokyo Olympics in 2021 after just 11 months of training. At the Australian Olympic Trials she qualified for the team in a career best time of 4.04.10 in the 400m Freestyle.

In Tokyo she finished 9th in the 400 metre Freestyle and won a bronze medal in the Women’s 4 x 200 metre Freestyle relay.

She formally retired in mid 2024, and is living in Melbourne with her cat Shinji.

== Personal life ==
Cook moved from South Africa to Perth, Australia when she was 8. She was attending St Mark's Anglican Community School until year 11. Cook moved to the School of Isolated and Distance Education in year 11 to focus on her swimming.
