= South Maui Coastal Heritage Corridor =

The South Maui Coastal Heritage Corridor is a recreation and tourism project of the Tri-Isle Resource Conservation and Development Council in the U.S. state of Hawaii. The non-profit council partners with the Natural Resources Conservation Service of the United States Department of Agriculture. The project is managed by a committee chairperson in cooperation with the Hawaii Department of Land and Natural Resources, Division of Forestry and Wildlife, Na Ala Hele Trails and Access Program, U.S. Fish and Wildlife Service, University of Hawaiʻi, Sea Grant Extension Service, and individuals from the community of Kihei. The project protects and provides public access to South Maui's 15 mile leeward coastline.

The project has installed interpretive signs between Maalaea and La Perouse Bay. Each sign describes the historic importance of the area in terms of Hawaiian cultural values and traditions. A network of bike paths is also planned.

== Coastal geography of South Maui ==
- Lahaina Pali Trail (Hoapili trail)
- Papawai Point (Lookout)
- McGregor Point (lighthouse)
- Kapoli Beach Park
- Māʻalaea Bay
- Māʻalaea Small Boat Harbor
- Haycraft Park
- Māʻalaea Community Garden
- Maui Coastal Wetlands Boardwalk
- Māʻalaea
- Kealia Pond National Wildlife Refuge
- Kealia Pond
- Māʻalaea Beach
- Sugar Beach
- Kihei Wharf
- Mai Poina ʻOe laʻu Beach Park
- Vancouver monument
- Hawaiian Islands Humpback Whale Sanctuary
- Kalepolepo Park
- Koʻieʻie Fishpond
- David Malo's Kilolani Church
- Waipuʻilani Park
- State Beach Reserve (South Maui)
- Koʻa i Kamaʻole Fishing Shrine (Kihei Public Library)
- Kalama Park
- Cove Park
- Charley Young Beach
- Kamaʻole Beach Park I
- Kamaʻole Beach Park II
- Kamaʻole Point
- Kamaʻole Beach Park III
- Kihei Boat Ramp
- Keawakapu Beach
- Mokapu Beach
- Ulua Beach
- Wailea Coastwalk
- Wailea Beach
- Wailea Point (Native coastal plants garden)
- Polo Beach
- Palauea Beach
- Poʻolenalena Beach Park (Paʻipu/Chang's Beach)
- Makena Landing
- Keawalaʻi Church
- Maluʻaka Beach Park
- Oneʻuli Beach (also known as Naupaka Beach)
- Puʻu ʻOlaʻi (Red Hill)
- Puʻu ʻOlaʻi Beach (Little Beach)
- Oneloa Beach (Big Beach)
- Makena State Park
- Molokini Shoal Marine Life Conservation District
- ʻAhihi Bay
- Cape Kinaʻu
- ʻAhihi-Kinaʻu Natural Area Reserve
- Keoneʻ o ʻio (Hawaii Historic Register District)
- Keoneʻ oʻio Bay (La Perouse Bay)
- Hoapili Trail (King's Highway)

== See also ==
- Cultural heritage
- List of beaches in Maui
