= School of Isolated and Distance Education =

Location
- 164 -194 Oxford Street, Leederville; Western Australia; Australia; 31.9358°S 115.8414°E

Information
- Type: State, co-educational, K-12, day school, online learning
- Motto: Online Learning Community, Innovation, Excellence
- Established: 2 September 1918
- School district: North Metropolitan Education Region
- Principal: Paul Mathews
- Grades: K–12
- Campus type: Distance education, online learning
- Website: www.side.wa.edu.au

The School of Isolated and Distance Education (SIDE) is the main centre for Kindergarten to Year 12 distance education and online learning within the Western Australian Department of Education. It provides education for students who for various reasons cannot attend classes in a regular school. It began operations as the Correspondence School in 1918. Its name and location have changed over time. It is currently located in Leederville, a suburb of Perth.

SIDE caters for Western Australian students who are:

- geographically isolated
- temporarily living overseas or travelling within Australia or overseas and not enrolled at a local school
- enrolled full-time in a registered dance/ballet school
- involved with elite performance including sport, theatre and music
- school-based students whose local schools are unable to offer appropriate courses
- unable to attend regular school due to severe health conditions.

A specialist Primary Languages Program in French, Italian, Indonesian and Japanese is also delivered online from SIDE to regional schools without specialist language teachers.

== History ==
A Perth-based distance education school was established in September 1918 as the Correspondence School of Western Australia. At this time Western Australia had a comparatively small population spread across a large and diverse geographic area, and families living in isolated areas were unable to provide a comprehensive education for their children. The main purpose of the school was to provide education to the ‘isolated’ and the ‘outback’ students.

Student enrolments for the new Correspondence School grew quickly. The curriculum was expanded to meet the needs of students who were not catered for in traditional schools. The cohort included children in post-primary years who did not have a local high school, physically disabled children, children whose parents had no fixed address or those who were temporarily living overseas where schooling was not available. There were also students in remote and rural areas who were over the compulsory school age but wanted to continue their studies. Correspondence lessons were also made available to Aboriginal children in pastoral areas, at Aboriginal Missions without schools and to post-primary Aboriginal students in small country schools.

Clarence Eakins was appointed Headmaster of the Correspondence School in May 1920, a post he held until 1951. Developments during this time included a comprehensive curriculum covering Infants to Junior Certificate. Itinerant teachers were appointed to visit and work with isolated students and any new technologies and philosophies were employed to improve the education of children across the state. In 1964 Eakins wrote a History of the Correspondence School.

== Name and service changes of the WA distance education school ==
In addition to the Perth-based school in existence since 1918, other services were established then amalgamated into the existing service. Five Schools of the Air were established in the 1960s as part of the Perth school but had become autonomous by the early 1980s.

Year	Name
1918	Correspondence School established.
1952	Western Australian Correspondence School. (Name change)
1970s	Isolated Students’ Matriculation Scheme (ISMS) (Year 11 and 12 service) Isolated Families Early Childhood Correspondence Scheme (ECCS) (Pre-primary service)
1983	Distance Education Centre (DEC) established. Based in West Perth. (Amalgamation of WA Correspondence School, ISMS and ECCS)
1995	Schools of Isolated and Distance Education created (SIDE). Based in Leederville. (Amalgamation of DEC, and the five Schools of the Air).
2012	School of Isolated and Distance Education (SIDE) renamed. Based in Leederville. Changes in organisational structure occurred when the Schools of the Air became fully autonomous within Department of Education regions, creating a Perth-based (K-12) school.

== Technology ==
Throughout its history, the school adopted new practices and technologies with the intention of improving educational opportunities for young people in rural and isolated conditions.

In the late 1950s and 1960s the Schools of the Air were developed using the Royal Flying Doctor's two-way radio network to hold classes with primary aged students in isolated areas. These lessons were intended to supplement the print correspondence work, and enabled immediate communication between students and their teacher, and for students to participate in classes together.

In the early 2000s remote families were provided with a satellite dish and computer by the Department of Education under the SatWeb project. At about the same time learning management systems were explored and tested. In 2009, SIDE began using Moodle, developed by former Kalgoorlie School of the Air student, Martin Dougiamas.

Significant changes in technology since 2006, particularly in the widespread adoption of internet technologies, have resulted in SIDE moving from a correspondence model to a fully online school. The school uses digital technologies to deliver online education programs in two complementary forms:

- Synchronous, real-time communication via the Cisco WebEx web-conferencing platform. Students have access to scheduled ‘live’ instruction.
- Asynchronous, 24/7 access. Moodle is used to deliver curriculum materials and facilitate student and teacher interaction online.

== Centenary year 2018 ==
By 2018 SIDE had made the transition from a paper-based correspondence education school to an online, flexible-learning institution, combining 100 years of experience with current pedagogical and technical expertise.

Celebrations in the Centenary Year included the launch of a Centenary website, and a series of activities throughout the year, culminating in an Open Day on 16 November 2018. Past staff, students and parents of all the Perth-based distance education schools contributed to the activities and projects throughout the year.

== Notable alumni ==
Sadie Canning MBE OAM - Western Australia's first Aboriginal nurse and matron.

Martin Dougiamas - Founder and CEO of Moodle Pty Ltd

Tonya McCusker AM - Administrator and a Director of the McCusker Charitable Foundation

Troye Sivan Mellet – Singer and actor

Tamsin Cook – Swimmer and 2016 Olympian Silver Medallist

Storm Hunter - Tennis Player

Gwenyth Graham AM - Social justice advocate.
