= Yuya Yajima =

Japanese swimmer

Personal information
- Nationality: Japanese
- Born: 14 July 1996 (age 29)

Sport
- Sport: Swimming
Medal record
Men's swimming
Representing Japan
Junior Pan Pacific Championships
Silver medal – second place	2014 Maui	200 m butterfly
Silver medal – second place	2014 Maui	4×100 m medley
Summer Universiade
Silver medal – second place	2015 Gwangju	200m butterfly

Yuya Yajima (born 14 July 1996) is a Japanese swimmer. He competed in the men's 200 metre butterfly event at the 2018 FINA World Swimming Championships (25 m), in Hangzhou, China.
