= ʻĀhihi-Kīnaʻu Natural Area Reserve =

Lava field in Hawaii, US

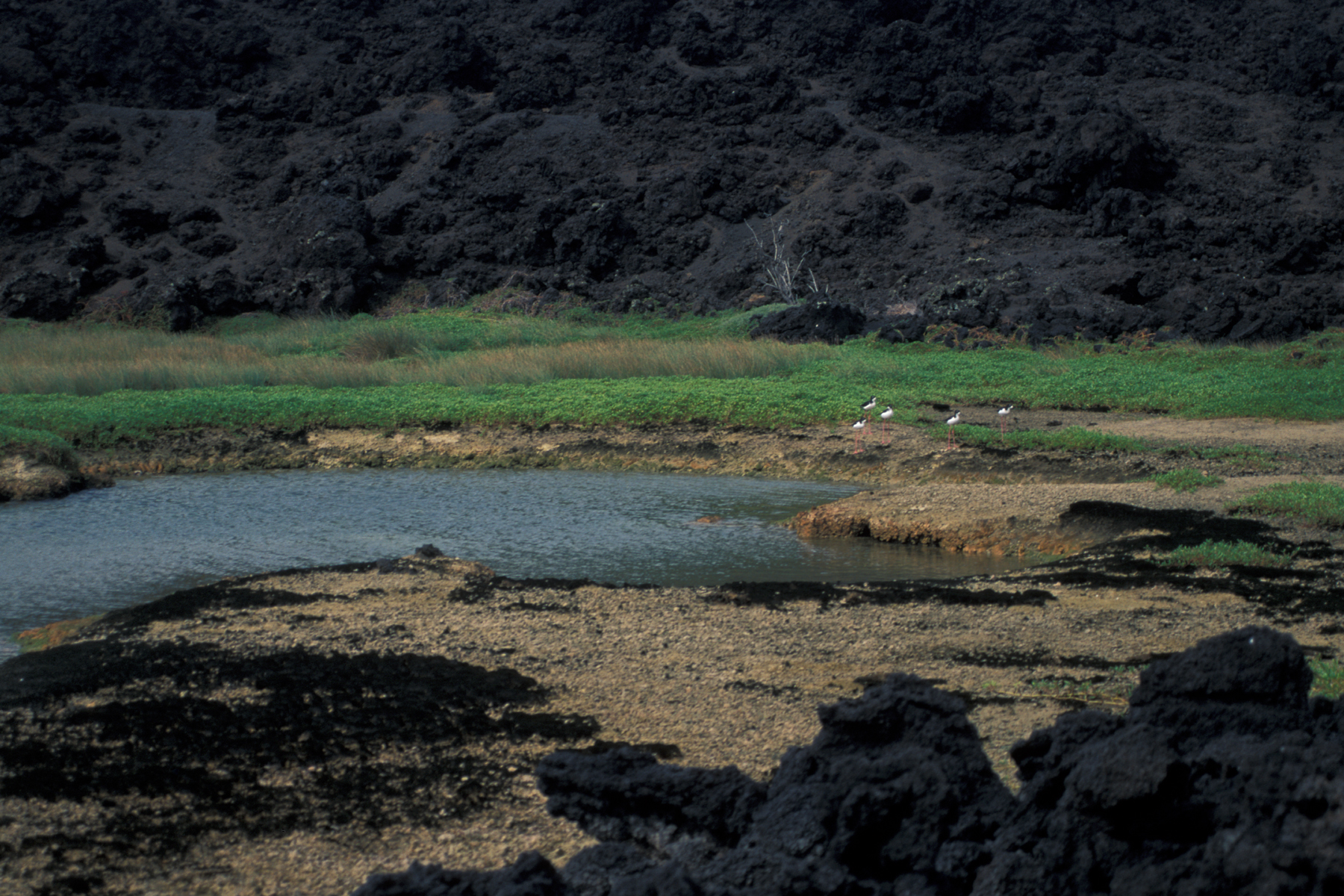
Sesuvium portulacastrum (habitat with forest)

Established in 1973, ʻĀhihi-Kīnaʻu Natural Area Reserve includes a coastal lava field and surrounding waters on the southwest coast of the island of Maui, Hawaii. It consists of 1,238 acres (501 ha) on land and 807 acres (327 ha) of ocean along 3 miles (4.8 km) of Maui's southwestern coastline. The reserve includes several popular snorkeling/diving sites and many cultural and geologic sites as well as habitat for numerous rare and endangered species. The purpose and intent of the Reserve is to preserve and protect three unique components: the geologic setting of the most recent lava flow on Maui; unique assemblages of nearshore coral reef ecosystems; and the anchialine ponds found there.

The reserve is located at the end of Mākena Road, south of Makena State Park and north of La Perouse Bay at 20°36′18″N 156°26′7″W.

== Climate ==
Annual rainfall ranges from 15 inches (38 cm) along the coast, to 24 inches (61 cm) along the mauka (upland) boundary. There is distinct seasonal variability in rainfall, with much of the precipitation from winter storms. The highest point in the reserve is Kalua O Lapa at 520 feet (160 m). The deepest water is 115 feet (35 m). Solar radiation here is among the highest in the State. The dark color of the lava absorbs solar radiation creating warmer conditions within the reserve than in surrounding areas (500 calories/m2/day).

== Geology ==
From north to south, the reserve spans four ahupuaʻa (land division extending from the uplands into the sea). These are Onau, Kanahena, Kualapa, and Kalihi. The reserve was named for the land and sea around the lava flow named Cape Kīnaʻu at the southern end of ʻĀhihi Bay.

The reserve's land boundary was specifically designed to encompass the young rugged lava flows on Haleakala volcano's southwest rift zone. Much of the reserve is barren, rough and jagged ʻaʻa lava with some smooth pahoehoe lava fed by the Kalua O Lapa cinder cone. These lava flows form Cape Kīnaʻu and coat the adjacent sea floor. Also within the reserve is the coastal part of an older, similar sequence of lava flows northwest of Kalua O Lapa. This older sequence, the Kanahena flows, erupted from an unnamed fissure at about 1,400 feet (430 m) altitude.

Five eruptions within the last 500 years are known from East Maui. Kalua O Lapa is among the youngest. Two radiocarbon ages have been determined of charcoal collected from beneath Kalua O Lapa lava and spatter deposits. The average ages indicate the lava flowed sometime between 1419 and 1621 AD. Radiocarbon dating of the Kanahena lava flows leave its age unresolved. The best estimate is between 1024 and 1183 AD.

== Marine habitat ==
The coral reefs of the reserve are among the finest in the main Hawaiian Islands. The reefs off of Kanahena were the only Maui reefs to increase coral cover in recent years (17‐30% from 1999‐2006). At least 33 species of coral, 53 species of subtidal invertebrate, and 75 species of fish (17 endemic) were found. Five marine species with protected status frequent the reserve: Hawaiian monk seal or 'ilio‐holo‐i‐ka‐uaua (Monachus schauinslandi); hawksbill turtle or ‘ea (Eretmochelys imbricata); green turtle or honu (Chelonia mydas); spinner dolphin or nai‘a (Stenella longirostris longirostris); and humpback whale or koholā (Megaptera novaeangliae). The marine portion of the reserve is within the Hawaiian Islands Humpback Whale National Marine Sanctuary. The Hawaiian monk seal, hawksbill turtle, and humpback whale are all listed as endangered under the Endangered Species Act (ESA).

== Land habitat ==
The Kalua O Lapa flow created lava tubes and depressions near the shoreline. Some of these depressions extend below sea level, allowing seawater to infiltrate and form shallow ponds. These characteristics created at least four different terrestrial habitats: 1) Aeolian (wind-supported) ecosystems on unvegetated lava; 2) Lava tubes and associated subterranean voids; 3) Littoral (associated with the coast) habitats; and 4) Seabird nesting habitats.

Botanically, the reserve is part of the lowland dry ecotype, although the reserve is not best known for its botanical resources. It is composed almost entirely of unvegetated barren lava. Kipukas (vegetated oases on the lava bed) harbor remnant native plants among the dominant non-native trees. Compared to this ecotype's historical extent on Maui, less than 2% was left as of 2010. Plant life cycles here are keyed to a very severe and prolonged dry season and variable wet season.

The six native plant communities include naio (Myoporum sandwicense), and maʻo (Gossypium tomentosum) in various kīpuka, or pockets. The endemic wiliwili (Erythrina sandwicensis) is the dominant tree of the remnant native dry forest zone. The natives are imperiled by weeds and feral ungulates such as goats. Twenty-one plant and fourteen animal taxa are native, of which three and five, respectively, are rare. Native insects include Blackburn's sphinx moth (Manduca blackburni), the first Hawaiian insect to be listed as endangered under the Endangered Species Act (ESA), in 2003. The reserve includes critical habitat for the moth.

=== Anchialine pools ===
Anchialine pools are surface brackish‐water pools, fed underground from both marine and fresh water sources. They lack a surface connection to the sea. The word anchialine is derived from the Greek word anchialos meaning close to the sea. Anchialine pools are globally rare. Hawaii is home to the only natural representatives of them in the United States as well as the largest concentration of them globally. Cape Kīnaʻu has 12 groupings of pools, including the state's largest. The diversity of shrimp in the pools is the greatest known in the Indo‐Pacific, and five of the ten species are listed as candidate species under the ESA. The pools provide habitat for water, shore, and migratory birds, native herbs and algae. The endangered aeʻo or Hawaiian stilt (Himantopus mexicanus knudseni) forage and nest in at least one of the pool complexes.

== Cultural significance ==
The Reserve includes both pre-European contact and post-contact Hawaiian village sites, heiau (religious sites), burials, trails, shelters, caves, loko iʻa (fish pond) complexes, ranching walls, and a lighthouse site. Nine site complexes are on the Hawaii Register of Historic Places, including the Maonakala Village Complex, Kualapa Cluster and Kauhuoaiakini and Halua Pool Complex. The reserve's cultural and historic sites are protected by Hawaii Revised Statute 13-209-4.

== History ==
=== Settlements and other development ===
Permanent settlements of the dry coastal areas of Keoneʻōʻio and ʻĀhihi are thought to have occurred between 1000 and 1400 AD Permanent Hawaiian occupation was based on marine resources and dry-land crops, dominated by ʻuala (sweet potato) cultivation in mauka (mountain) areas. Fish and other marine resources were important staples. The name Keoneʻōʻio refers to the ʻōʻio or bonefish (Albula glossondonta) which was once abundant. In 1786, French explorer La Pérouse noted as many as five villages in the area. These include Maʻonakala village at the far northern end n ʻĀhihi Bay, as well as four small villages in Keoneʻōʻio, each with 10 to 12 thatched houses. Shore dwellers focused primarily on fishing and had access to potable water at shoreline springs. Trade between uplands and coast was frequent.

As European and American merchants, whalers, and missionaries gained influence in the 19th century, traditional society was drawn into global society. Migration and disease contributed to rapid population decline in rural areas. In Honuaʻula, census data showed a decline between 1831 and 1836 from 3,340 to 1,911. By the mid-1840s land use in Honuaʻula transitioned from subsistence to commercial agriculture. An estimated 150 people lived in or near to ʻĀhihi-Kīnaʻu and Keoneʻōʻio in 1853. These changes were associated with changes in land tenure, which eventually allowed "government" lands to become the reserve.

The most prominent and lasting of the Hawaiian government's improvements in the 19th century was the government road built under the direction of Hoapili, governor of Maui from 1823 to 1840. The road connected Honuaʻula to Kaupō along the shore. The road traversed the reserve, and evidently underlies the present and only road. Today the historic road can be seen from Keoneʻōʻio through Kahikinui. The Kanahena Lighthouse was operated on Kanahena Point from 1884 until its replacement opened at nearby Cape Hanamanioa in 1918.

=== 20th century ===
During World War II, the U.S. Military conducted maneuvers in south Maui, fortifying coastal areas with bunkers. Amphibious landings were made at Mākena. Some of the structures are visible at Oneloa Beach in Mākena State Park, and a concrete ramp from the era at Keoneʻōʻio. In 1945-1946, Cape Kīnaʻu was used for bombing target practice by the Navy. Unexploded ordnance is still present on Cape Kīnaʻu. The reserve's Kanahena Parking Area (also known as "Dumps") was a dump site for metal debris, such as barbed wire from around the coastline during and after the war. The popular surfing spot in the NAR takes its name from this former dump site.

From 1980 to 2000, Maui's population doubled from 63,000 to 128,000. Including visitors, the number can reach 30-50,000 more. In 1980 the area bordering the reserve (Kīhei to Mākena) hosted 7,263 in a quiet rural area with miles of uncrowded beaches and a few small hotels. Today, Kīhei-Mākena is the second largest tourism area on Maui with a population of more than 22,400, in a 10 miles (16 km) strip of urban/suburban development. With more people and the paving of the road to La Pérouse Bay/Keoneʻōʻio in the 1990s, the reserve and adjacent areas became an increasingly popular destination. In 2001, visitor counts reached 805 people per day and as many as 339 vehicles. As of 2010, the partially closed reserve received an average of 700 visitors per day/250,000 per year.

== Natural area reserve ==
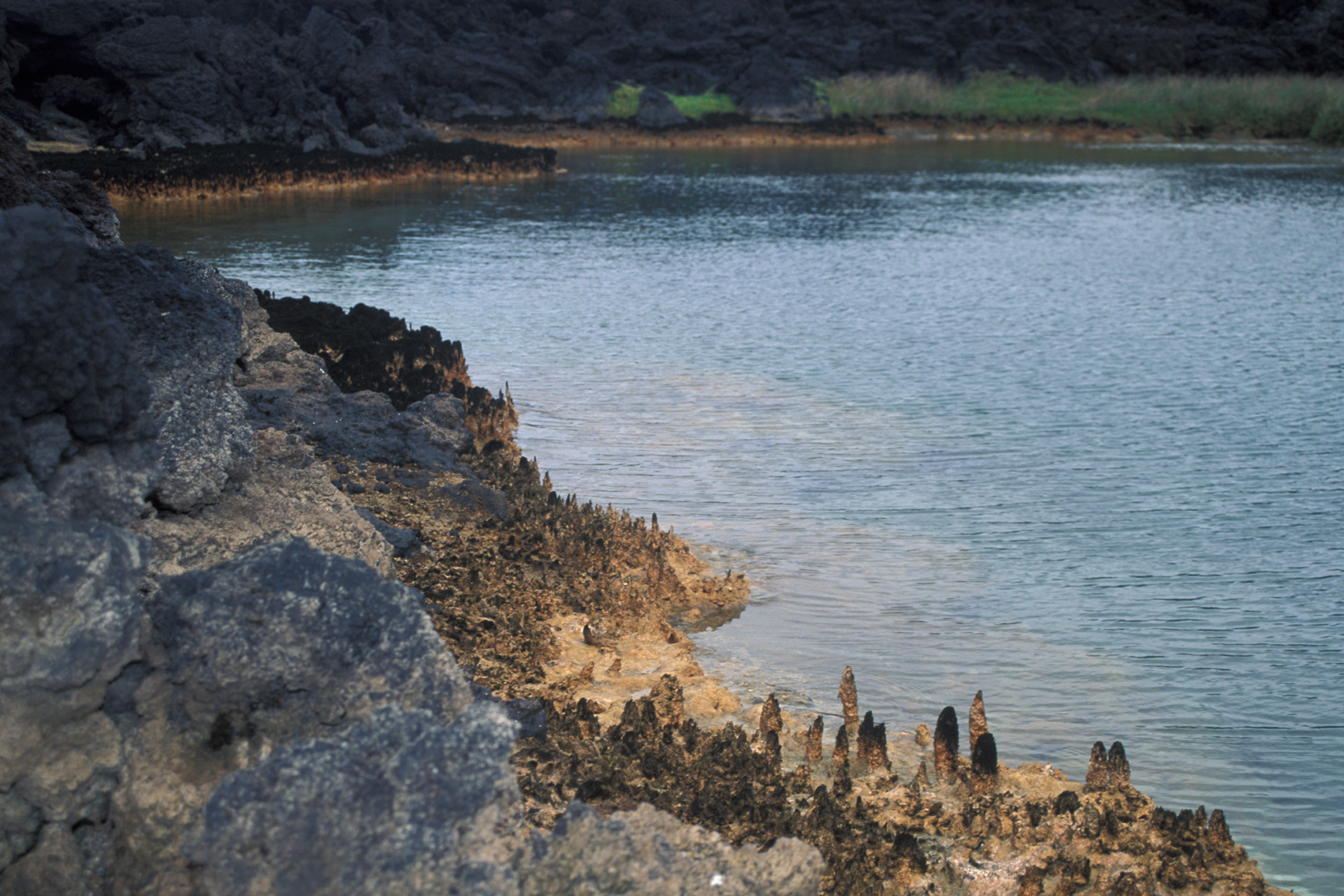
Cyperus laevigatus

ʻĀhihi-Kīnaʻu was Hawaii's first such reserve, and remains the only one to include both land and marine resources, and the only area on state lands where an entire lava flow is protected from its source to the sea.

Among other protections is a complete, if imperfectly enforced, fishing ban. Because of the extent of unvegetated flow and the lava's extreme roughness and fractured nature, the area is extremely difficult to traverse on foot. Thus, the reserve functions as an outdoor natural history classroom that provides many opportunities to educate and create awareness that the landscape found here is a representative example of the geologic forces that created the Hawaiian archipelago.

ʻĀhihi-Kīnaʻu is one of 19 reserves in Hawaii's Natural Area Reserve System (NARS), which encompasses 109,651 acres (44,374 ha). The Division of Forestry and Wildlife within the Department of Land and Natural Resources (DLNR) administers NARS. TheNatural Area Reserves System provides permanent legal protection for conservation of resource values, one of the highest levels of legal protection for state-managed natural areas in Hawaii. NARS make up 11% of the 1,000,000 acres (400,000 ha) under DLNR jurisdiction. Other types of designation include Wildlife Sanctuary and Forest Reserve. The NAR system's mission is to: "ensure the stewardship for Hawaii’s unique natural resources through acquisition, active management, and other strategies." Many of the reserves are remote and have few visitors. Conversely, coastal reserves are accessible and can be heavily used by the public. Kaʻena Point on Oʻahu is another such reserve.

Reserve status prohibits removing, injuring, or killing any living thing as well as damaging, disturbing, or removing any geologic artifact or cultural site.

ʻĀhihi-Kīnaʻu trails were poorly marked and little observed. Heavy use was starting to degrade the environment and visitors got injured and lost crossing the lava fields. Attempts to limit or reduce the human impacts while continuing to allow access were not working, according to Bill Evanson of the state Division of Forestry and Wildlife.

Despite these pressures, a 2007 Division of Aquatic Resources survey indicated that the ʻĀhihi-Kīnaʻu coral reef was the only tested reef in Hawaii that was not in decline.

=== Advisory group ===
The Advisory Group was formed in 2002 and provides guidance about the reserve and Keoneʻōʻio. For example, DLNR sought the group's advice on the use of kayaks and commercial activity in the area. The group reflects diverse stakeholder interests and is chaired by the DLNR Deputy Director. Represented groups include educators, Native Hawaiian cultural practitioners, lineal descendants of early residents in the area, landowners, residents, the visitor industry, recreational users, fishers, conservation organizations, and scientists.

DLNR's Division of Conservation Resources Enforcement (DOCARE) enforces related laws and regulations under implementing legislation HRS Chapter 199. Hawaii's Historic Preservation Division (SHPD) reviews/approves proposed actions that affect historic properties under §6E‐8, HRS, and chapter 13‐275, HAR. SHPD archives the inventory of historic properties and archaeological and historical documents prepared to fulfill the requirements of the State's historic preservation law.

== Partial closure ==
Starting August 1, 2008, Hawaii closed access to the majority of the reserve, including unofficial trails to Kalua o Lapa, Kalaeloa (popularly known as “the Aquarium”), and Mokuha (also known as “the Fishbowl”). Preserving the anchialine pools was a major focus. Main threats to these wetlands include non-native invasives such as fish or prawns, algal mat formations and human activities.

Access to the reserve's northern portions, which are most used by the public, have remained open. These include Waiala Cove and the coastal area along ʻAhihi Bay including the “Dumps” surf break.

Department of Land and Natural Resources staff monitor the reserve to assess the effects of the closure and estimate the impacts of further protective actions.

The closure was scheduled to end July 31, 2010.

== Post-closure ==
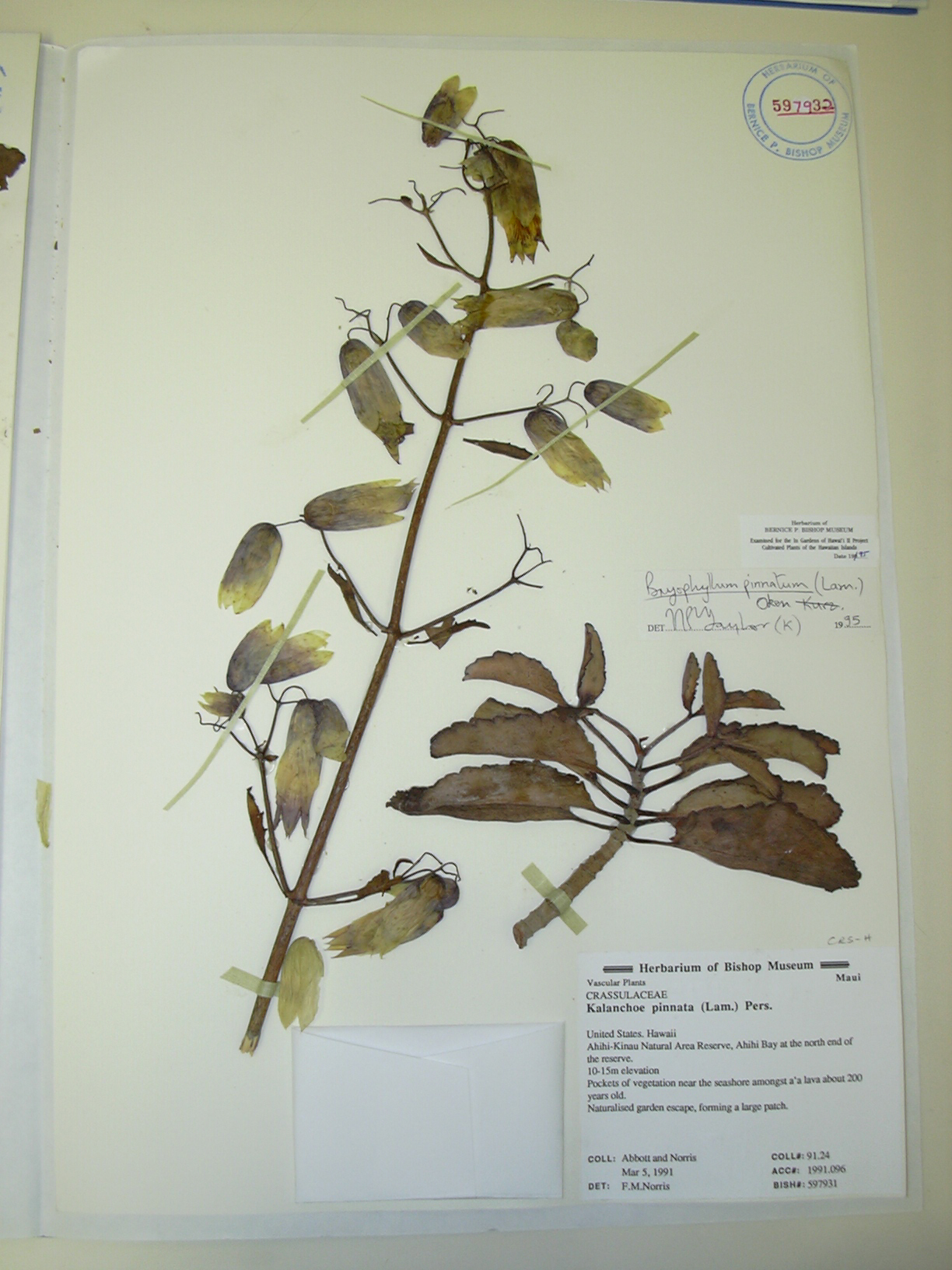
Kalanchoe pinnata

An advisory group recommended extending the closure.

The first draft of the area master plan was released in October, 2010, attempting to balance protection with human activities.

DLNR monitors the area's marine, geological and cultural resources to inform the planning process for the reserve. The plan has taken longer than expected to complete, in part because Āhihi-Kinau has so many more cultural and archaeological sites than other Natural Area Reserves, and also because of budget challenges.

Alternatives to full opening include guided hikes, entry permits, or commercial concessions. Much-anticipated guided hikes have been on hold because of spotty communications coverage for emergency radios and cell phones.
