= La Perouse Bay =

Bay in Maui County, United States

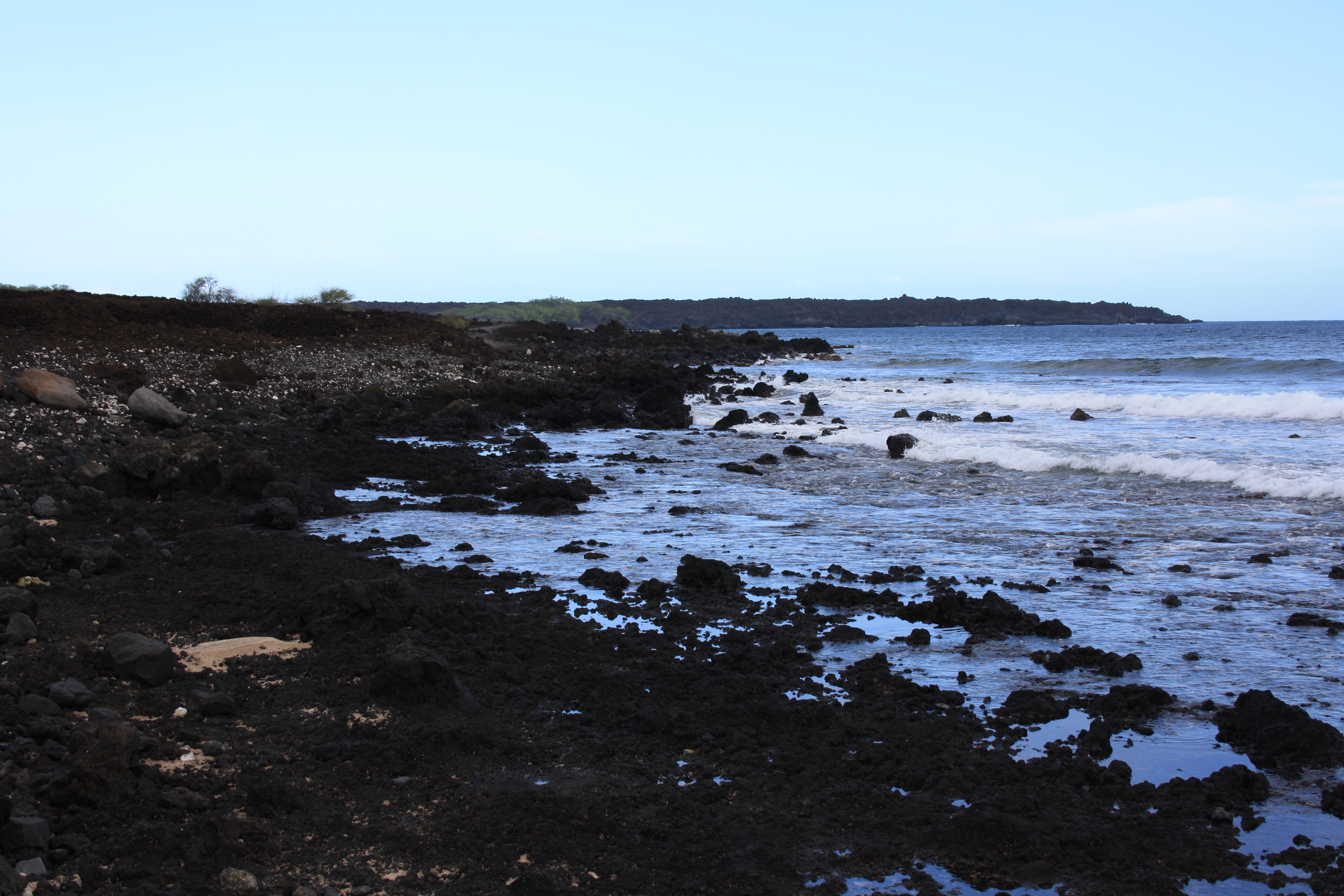
La Perouse Bay, looking south

Keoneʻōʻio or La Perouse Bay is located south of the town of Wailea on Maui, at the end of Mākena Alanui Road (State Highway 31) at 20°35′54″N 156°25′12″W. The bay's Hawaiian name is Keoneʻōʻio.

It was later named for the French explorer Captain Jean-François de Galaup, comte de La Pérouse. But has been referred to the French explorer. In 1786, La Pérouse surveyed and mapped the prominent embayment near the southern cape of Maui opposite the island of Kahoʻolawe. The bay is the site of Maui's most recent volcanic activity, about 500 years ago. The rounded peninsula that dominates the northern half of the bay and extends up the coast a short distance was formed about 900,000 years ago by an eruption of basaltic lava that originated in the southernmost landward expression of the Haleakalā Southwest Rift Zone. A small string of cinder cones extending inland to the northeast marks the axis of the rift zone.

Keoneʻōʻio lies directly south of the ʻĀhihi-Kīnaʻu Natural Area Reserve. Fishing is prohibited within the reserve, which is home to many endemic and other fish species, marine mammals, green sea turtles, and coastal plants. The area contains many archaeological sites, including fishing shrines, salt pans, and heiau, or religious platforms. The road ends at the parking lot/entrance to the seashore and marks the start of the King's Highway, a trail that circumnavigated the island, originally built by Piʻilani and later improved by Governor Hoapili, sometimes called the Hoapili trail.
