= 2016 FINA World Swimming Championships (25 m) – Men's 4 × 50 metre freestyle relay =

Men's 4 × 50 metre freestyle relay at the 2016 FINA World Swimming Championships (25 m)
- Venue: WFCU Centre
- Dates: 9 December (heats and final)
- Competitors: 76 from 19 nations
- Teams: 19
- Winning time: 1:24.32

Medalists
gold medal	Aleksei Brianskiy; Nikita Lobintsev; Aleksandr Popkov; Vladimir Morozov; Kirill Prigoda	Russia
silver medal	Paul Powers; Blake Pieroni; Michael Chadwick; Tom Shields; Dillon Virva; Michael Andrew	United States
bronze medal	Kosuke Matsui; Kenta Ito; Shinri Shioura; Junya Koga	Japan

The Men's 4 × 50 metre freestyle relay competition of the 2016 FINA World Swimming Championships (25 m) was held on 9 December 2016.

== Records ==
Prior to the competition, the existing world and championship records were as follows.

	Nation	Time	Location	Date
World record Championship record	Russia	1:22.60	Doha	6 December 2014

== Results ==
=== Heats ===
The heats were held at 09:30.

Rank	Heat	Lane	Nation	Swimmers	Time	Notes
1	3	2	United States	Dillon Virva (21.55); Michael Chadwick (20.81); Michael Andrew (21.51); Paul Powers (21.14)	1:25.01	Q
2	3	0	Russia	Kirill Prigoda (22.10); Aleksei Brianskiy (21.04); Nikita Lobintsev (21.23); Aleksandr Popkov (20.96)	1:25.33	Q
3	3	1	Japan	Kosuke Matsui (21.61); Kenta Ito (21.02); Shinri Shioura (21.49); Junya Koga (21.39)	1:25.51	Q
4	2	4	Netherlands	Nyls Korstanje (21.89); Jesse Puts (20.99); Kyle Stolk (21.56); Ben Schwietert (21.76)	1:26.20	Q
5	3	1	South Africa	Douglas Erasmus (21.79); Brad Tandy (21.22); Chad Le Clos (21.23); Eben Vorster (22.71)	1:26.95	Q
6	2	2	Belarus	Yauhen Tsurkin (21.96); Anton Latkin (21.33); Viktar Staselovich (22.12); Artsiom Machekin (21.61)	1:27.02	Q
7	3	4	France	Yonel Govindin (22.08); Clément Mignon (21.27); Thomas Avetand (22.72); Mehdy Metella (21.36)	1:27.43	Q
8	2	5	China	Li Zhuhao (22.12); Lin Yongqing (21.68); Liu Zhaochen (21.94); Yu Hexin (21.95)	1:27.69	Q
9	2	6	Sweden	Christoffer Carlssen (22.18); Robin Andreasson (21.84); Axel Pettersson (21.72); Daniel Forndal (22.00)	1:27.74	
10	1	8	Canada	Javier Acevedo (22.46); Yuri Kisil (21.42); Mirando Richard-Jarry (22.05); Evan van Moerkerke (22.19)	1:28.12	
11	1	6	Hungary	Maksim Lobanovski (21.71); Dávid Földházi (21.41); Richárd Márton (22.52); Márton Barta (22.80)	1:29.44	
12	2	8	Paraguay	Charles Hockin (22.20); Benjamin Hockin (21.55); Ivo Kunzle Savastano (23.23); Mathias Zacarias (23.48)	1:30.46	
13	3	7	Iceland	Aron Orn Stefansson (22.87); Viktor Mani Vilbergsson (22.82); Kristinn Porarinsson (22.95); David Adalsteinsson (22.43)	1:31.07	
14	2	3	Singapore	Kai Quan Yeo (22.61); Dylan Koo (22.69); Sheng Jun Pang (23.10); Chien Yin Lionel Khoo (23.19)	1:31.59	
15	1	4	Hong Kong	Chun Nam Derick Ng (22.87); Chun Yan Wong (22.69); Kin Tat Kent Cheung (22.24); Ho Lun Raymond Mak (22.86)	1:31.62	
16	2	7	Macau	Pok Man Ngou (23.53); Sizhuang Lin (23.48); Ka Kun Sio (24.14); Man Hou Chao (22.68)	1:33.83	
17	2	1	Papua New Guinea	Livingston Aika (24.87); Ashley Seeto (24.40); Stanford Kawale (23.18); Ryan Pini (22.32)	1:34.77	
18	1	3	Philippines	Jeremy Bryan Lin (24.25); Axel Toni Steven Ngui (23.41); Alberto Batungbacal (24.48); Alfonso José Bautista (23.50)	1:35.64	
19	3	6	Tanzania	Hilal Hemed Hilal (23.81); Adil Bharmal (25.01); Joseph Richard Sumari (28.57); Dennis Hamis Mhini (28.51)	1:45.90	
	1	0	Kenya			DNS
	1	2	Angola			DNS
	1	5	Uzbekistan			DNS
	1	7	Seychelles			DNS
	2	0	Puerto Rico			DNS
	3	3	Dominican Republic			DNS
	3	5	Thailand			DNS
	3	8	Albania			DNS

=== Final ===
The final was held at 18:30.

Rank	Lane	Nation	Swimmers	Time	Notes
1st place, gold medalist(s)	5	Russia	Aleksei Brianskiy (21.70); Nikita Lobintsev (21.06); Aleksandr Popkov (20.85); Vladimir Morozov (20.71)	1:24.32	
2nd place, silver medalist(s)	4	United States	Paul Powers (21.73); Blake Pieroni (21.14); Michael Chadwick (21.02); Tom Shields (20.58)	1:24.47	
3rd place, bronze medalist(s)	3	Japan	Kosuke Matsui (21.81); Kenta Ito (20.96); Shinri Shioura (20.60); Junya Koga (21.14)	1:24.51	
4	1	France	Clément Mignon (21.38); Jérémy Stravius (20.94); Mehdy Metella (21.18); Yonel Govindin (21.19)	1:24.69	
5	6	Netherlands	Nyls Korstanje (21.75); Jesse Puts (20.71); Ben Schwietert (21.55); Kyle Stolk (21.21)	1:25.22	
6	2	South Africa	Brad Tandy (21.34); Chad Le Clos (20.83); Douglas Erasmus (21.21); Eben Vorster (22.23)	1:25.61	
7	7	Belarus	Yauhen Tsurkin (21.67); Anton Latkin (21.27); Viktar Staselovich (22.15); Artsiom Machekin (21.43)	1:26.52	
8	8	China	Li Zhuhao (22.14); Lin Yongqing (21.39); Liu Zhaochen (22.02); Yu Hexin (21.21)	1:26.76	
