= 2016 FINA World Swimming Championships (25 m) – Men's 100 metre individual medley =

Men's 100 metre individual medley at the 2016 FINA World Swimming Championships (25 m)
- Venue: WFCU Centre
- Dates: 8 December (heats and semifinals); 9 December (final)
- Competitors: 84 from 59 nations
- Winning time: 51.84

Medalists
gold medal	Michael Andrew	United States
silver medal	Daiya Seto	Japan
bronze medal	Shinri Shioura	Japan

The Men's 100 metre individual medley competition of the 2016 FINA World Swimming Championships (25 m) was held on 8 and 9 December 2016.

== Records ==
Prior to the competition, the existing world and championship records were as follows.

	Name	Nation	Time	Location	Date
World record	Vladimir Morozov	Russia	50.30	Berlin	30 August 2016
Championship record	Markus Deibler	Germany	50.66	Doha	7 December 2014

== Results ==
=== Heats ===
The heats were held at 09:30.

Rank	Heat	Lane	Name	Nationality	Time	Notes
1	9	4	Vladimir Morozov	Russia	52.33	Q
2	8	3	Michael Andrew	United States	52.58	Q
3	9	5	Daiya Seto	Japan	52.76	Q
4	7	4	Shinri Shioura	Japan	52.86	Q
5	9	6	Jack Gerrard	Australia	52.89	Q
6	8	4	Wang Shun	China	52.91	Q
6	8	5	Philip Heintz	Germany	52.91	Q
8	8	6	Kyle Stolk	Netherlands	53.07	Q
9	9	9	Andreas Vazaios	Greece	53.19	Q
10	1	7	Mark Szaranek	Great Britain	53.40	Q
11	7	7	Alexis Santos	Portugal	53.41	Q
12	7	5	Simon Sjödin	Sweden	53.44	Q
13	7	1	Dávid Földházi	Hungary	53.47	Q
14	7	6	Daniil Pakhomov	Russia	53.48	Q
15	8	7	Markus Lie	Norway	53.53	Q, NR
16	9	3	Fabio Scozzoli	Italy	53.57	Q, WD
17	9	7	Martin Liivamägi	Estonia	53.59	Q
18	6	4	Evan White	Canada	53.70	
19	7	3	Mitch Larkin	Australia	53.81	
20	7	8	Jérémy Desplanches	Switzerland	53.86	
21	9	8	Daniel Skaaning	Denmark	53.89	
22	7	2	Jan Šefl	Czech Republic	53.94	
23	9	1	Ben Hockin	Paraguay	54.17	
24	9	2	Diogo Carvalho	Portugal	54.18	
25	8	1	Hu Yixuan	China	54.28	
26	6	3	Apostolos Christou	Greece	54.37	
27	2	0	Uvis Kalniņš	Latvia	54.41	
28	8	2	Martti Aljand	Estonia	54.58	
29	9	0	Adam Halas	Slovakia	54.87	
30	5	4	Pang Sheng Jun	Singapore	55.06	
31	1	4	Jakub Maly	Austria	55.17	
31	8	9	Jordy Groters	Aruba	55.17	NR
33	6	5	Kristinn Þórarinsson	Iceland	55.19	
34	8	0	Nikolajs Maskaļenko	Latvia	55.42	
35	8	8	Trần Duy Khôi	Vietnam	55.47	NR
36	7	0	Viktor Bromer	Denmark	55.64	
37	6	1	Tomas Peribonio	Ecuador	55.82	NR
38	5	5	Pavel Janeček	Czech Republic	55.86	
39	7	9	Mak Ho Lun Raymond	Hong Kong	55.89	
40	6	0	Márton Barta	Hungary	55.94	
41	2	7	Oleg Garasymovytch	France	56.20	
42	6	9	Lionel Khoo	Singapore	56.32	
43	3	3	Luke Reilly	Canada	56.53	
44	5	3	Viktor Vilbergsson	Iceland	56.79	
45	6	2	Alaric Basson	South Africa	57.12	
46	5	0	Ralph Goveia	Zambia	57.15	NR
47	1	6	Marc Rojas	Dominican Republic	57.29	
48	5	8	Esteban Araya	Costa Rica	57.44	NR
49	2	2	Keanan Dols	Jamaica	57.45	
50	6	8	Alard Basson	South Africa	57.46	
51	4	4	Pedro Pinotes	Angola	57.67	
52	6	7	Yeziel Morales Miranda	Puerto Rico	57.84	
53	2	3	Jarod Arroyo	Puerto Rico	57.94	
54	2	1	Adrian Hoek	Curaçao	58.25	NR
55	2	6	Alberto Batungbaca	Philippines	58.39	
56	6	6	Noah Al-Khulaifi	Qatar	58.44	NR
57	5	6	Miguel Mena	Nicaragua	58.49	NR
58	5	2	João Matias	Angola	58.66	
59	3	1	Brandon Schuster	Samoa	58.78	NR
60	4	6	Julian Fletcher	Bermuda	59.14	NR
61	4	8	Adam Allouche	Lebanon	59.49	
62	4	7	Alex Axiotis	Zambia	59.80	
63	4	3	Colin Bensadon	Gibraltar	59.97	
64	4	5	Mathias Zacarias	Paraguay	1:00.16	
65	4	9	Mathieu Marquet	Mauritius	1:00.31	NR
66	4	1	Zandanbal Gunsennorov	Mongolia	1:00.43	NR
67	3	5	Ryan Maskelyne	Papua New Guinea	1:00.45	
68	5	9	Fausto Huerta	Dominican Republic	1:00.61	
69	1	2	Michael Stafrace	Malta	1:00.63	
70	3	4	Gregory Penny	United States Virgin Islands	1:00.77	
71	4	2	Joaquin Sepulveda Parra	Chile	1:01.61	
72	3	6	Ashley Seeto	Papua New Guinea	1:01.87	NR
73	3	8	Kennet Libohova	Albania	1:02.90	NR
74	3	2	Marco Flores	Honduras	1:03.21	
75	3	7	Ridhwan Mohamed	Kenya	1:03.89	
76	1	3	Rainier Rafaela	Curaçao	1:04.42	
77	1	1	Meriton Veliu	Kosovo	1:05.28	NR
78	3	9	Salofi Welch	Northern Mariana Islands	1:06.25	
79	1	5	Tongli Panuve	Tonga	1:06.48	NR
80	3	0	Christian Villacrusis	Northern Mariana Islands	1:07.08	
81	2	5	Joseph Sumari	Tanzania	1:15.60	NR
82	2	4	Dennis Mhini	Tanzania	1:16.42	
	2	8	Matthew Josa	United States		DSQ
	2	9	Teimuraz Kobakhidze	Georgia		DSQ
	4	0	Jonathan Gómez	Colombia		DNS
	5	1	Artyom Kozlyuk	Uzbekistan		DNS
	5	7	Paul Elaisa	Fiji		DNS

=== Semifinals ===
The semifinals were held at 18:44.

==== Semifinal 1 ====
Rank	Lane	Name	Nationality	Time	Notes
1	5	Shinri Shioura	Japan	52.35	Q
2	4	Michael Andrew	United States	52.41	Q
3	3	Wang Shun	China	52.73	Q
4	6	Kyle Stolk	Netherlands	52.87	Q
5	7	Simon Sjödin	Sweden	52.88	Q
6	1	Daniil Pakhomov	Russia	53.19	
7	2	Mark Szaranek	United Kingdom	53.53	
8	8	Martin Liivamägi	Estonia	53.87	

==== Semifinal 2 ====
Rank	Lane	Name	Nationality	Time	Notes
1	5	Daiya Seto	Japan	52.09	Q
2	4	Vladimir Morozov	Russia	52.44	Q
3	6	Philip Heintz	Germany	52.63	Q
4	3	Jack Gerrard	Australia	53.03	
5	7	Alexis Santos	Portugal	53.06	NR
6	8	Markus Lie	Norway	53.15	NR
7	2	Andreas Vazaios	Greece	53.36	
8	1	Dávid Földházi	Hungary	53.61	

=== Final ===
The final was held at 18:42.

Rank	Lane	Name	Nationality	Time	Notes
1st place, gold medalist(s)	3	Michael Andrew	United States	51.84	WJ
2nd place, silver medalist(s)	4	Daiya Seto	Japan	52.01	
3rd place, bronze medalist(s)	5	Shinri Shioura	Japan	52.17	
4	7	Wang Shun	China	52.21	
5	2	Philip Heintz	Germany	52.78	
6	6	Vladimir Morozov	Russia	52.83	
6	8	Simon Sjödin	Sweden	52.83	
8	1	Kyle Stolk	Netherlands	53.31	
