= 2018 FINA World Swimming Championships (25 m) – Men's 100 metre individual medley =

Men's 100 metre individual medley at the 2018 FINA World Swimming Championships (25 m)
- Venue: Hangzhou Sports Park Stadium
- Dates: 13 December (heats and semifinals); 14 December (final)
- Competitors: 38
- Winning time: 50.63

Medalists
gold medal	Kliment Kolesnikov	Russia
silver medal	Marco Orsi	Italy
bronze medal	Michael Andrew	United States

The men's 100 metre individual medley competition of the 2018 FINA World Swimming Championships (25 m) was held on 13 and 14 December 2018.

== Records ==
Prior to the competition, the existing world and championship records were as follows.

	Name	Nation	Time	Location	Date
World record	Vladimir Morozov	Russia	50.26	Eindhoven	28 September 2018
Championship record	Markus Deibler	Germany	50.66	Doha	7 December 2014

The following new records were set during this competition:

Date	Event	Name	Nation	Time	Record
14 December	Final	Kliment Kolesnikov	Russia	50.63	CR

== Results ==
=== Heats ===
The heats were started on 13 December at 9:30.

Rank	Heat	Lane	Name	Nationality	Time	Notes
1	4	4	Michael Andrew	United States	51.50	Q
2	2	4	Kliment Kolesnikov	Russia	51.69	Q
3	3	5	Marco Orsi	Italy	51.86	Q
4	4	6	Markus Lie	Norway	52.12	Q
5	4	5	Wang Shun	China	52.15	Q
6	2	5	Caio Pumputis	Brazil	52.31	Q
7	3	4	Sergey Fesikov	Russia	52.33	Q
8	3	3	Hiromasa Fujimori	Japan	52.35	Q
9	4	3	Kenneth To	Hong Kong	52.38	Q
10	3	7	Heiko Gigler	Austria	52.52	Q
11	4	2	Bernhard Reitshammer	Austria	52.78	Q
12	2	7	Alexis Santos	Portugal	53.09	Q
13	3	2	Simon Sjödin	Sweden	53.31	Q
14	2	3	Diego Prado	Brazil	53.50	Q
15	2	2	Jack Gerrard	Australia	53.51	Q
16	4	7	Bradlee Ashby	New Zealand	53.64	Q
17	4	1	Dávid Földházi	Hungary	53.67	
18	2	1	Ben Hockin	Paraguay	53.82	
19	2	6	Emmanuel Vanluchene	Belgium	53.90	
20	3	1	Diogo Carvalho	Portugal	53.97	
21	2	8	Ádám Halás	Slovakia	54.29	
22	3	8	Raphaël Stacchiotti	Luxembourg	54.44	
23	4	0	Omar Pinzón	Colombia	54.48	
24	4	9	Kristinn Þórarinsson	Iceland	54.72	
25	2	0	Huang Yen-hsin	Chinese Taipei	54.78	
26	4	8	Andriy Khloptsov	Ukraine	55.05	
27	1	4	Andrei Tuomola	Finland	55.69	
28	3	9	Peter John Stevens	Slovenia	55.76	
29	2	9	Berk Özkul	Turkey	56.47	
30	1	7	Patrick Groters	Aruba	56.56	
31	1	3	Svetlozar Nikolov	Bulgaria	56.75	
32	1	8	José Alberto Quintanilla	Bolivia	56.77	
33	1	1	Filippos Iakovidis	Cyprus	58.04	
34	1	6	Leonard Kalate	Papua New Guinea	59.56	
35	1	2	Duran Alfonso	Honduras	1:01.75	
	1	5	Ali Boabbas	Kuwait	DSQ	
	3	0	Brad Tandy	South Africa	DNS	
	3	6	Mitch Larkin	Australia	DNS	

=== Semifinals ===
The semifinals were started on 13 December at 19:14.

==== Semifinal 1 ====
Rank	Lane	Name	Nationality	Time	Notes
1	4	Kliment Kolesnikov	Russia	50.90	Q, WJ
2	6	Hiromasa Fujimori	Japan	51.50	Q
3	3	Caio Pumputis	Brazil	52.15	Q
4	5	Markus Lie	Norway	52.43	
5	7	Alexis Santos	Portugal	52.91	
6	2	Heiko Gigler	Austria	52.99	
7	8	Bradlee Ashby	New Zealand	53.14	
8	1	Diego Prado	Brazil	53.34	

==== Semifinal 2 ====
Rank	Lane	Name	Nationality	Time	Notes
1	5	Marco Orsi	Italy	51.42	Q
2	4	Michael Andrew	United States	51.44	Q
3	3	Wang Shun	China	51.92	Q
4	6	Sergey Fesikov	Russia	52.31	Q
5	2	Kenneth To	Hong Kong	52.33	Q
6	7	Bernhard Reitshammer	Austria	52.51	
7	8	Jack Gerrard	Australia	52.69	
7	1	Simon Sjödin	Sweden	53.02	

=== Final ===
The final was held on 14 December at 19:13.

Rank	Lane	Name	Nationality	Time	Notes
1st place, gold medalist(s)	4	Kliment Kolesnikov	Russia	50.63	CR, WJ
2nd place, silver medalist(s)	5	Marco Orsi	Italy	51.03	
3rd place, bronze medalist(s)	3	Michael Andrew	United States	51.58	
4	1	Sergey Fesikov	Russia	51.63	
5	8	Kenneth To	Hong Kong	51.88	
6	2	Wang Shun	China	51.95	
7	7	Caio Pumputis	Brazil	52.28	
–	6	Hiromasa Fujimori	Japan	DSQ	
