= 2016 FINA World Swimming Championships (25 m) – Men's 4 × 50 metre medley relay =

Men's 4 × 50 metre medley relay at the 2016 FINA World Swimming Championships (25 m)
- Venue: WFCU Centre
- Dates: 10 December (heats and final)
- Competitors: 72 from 18 nations
- Teams: 18
- Winning time: 1:31.52

Medalists
gold medal	Andrei Shabasov; Kirill Prigoda; Aleksandr Popkov; Vladimir Morozov; Grigory Tarasevich; Oleg Kostin; Daniil Pakhomov; Aleksei Brianskiy	Russia
silver medal	Jacob Pebley; Cody Miller; Tom Shields; Michael Chadwick; Matthew Josa; Michael Andrew; Paul Powers	United States
bronze medal	Pavel Sankovich; Ilya Shymanovich; Yauhen Tsurkin; Anton Latkin	Belarus

The Men's 4 × 50 metre medley relay competition of the 2016 FINA World Swimming Championships (25 m) was held on 10 December 2016.

== Records ==
Prior to the competition, the existing world and championship records were as follows.

	Nation	Time	Location	Date
World record Championship record	Brazil	1:30.51	Doha	4 December 2014

== Results ==
=== Heats ===
The heats were held at 09:30.

Rank	Heat	Lane	Nation	Swimmers	Time	Notes
1	2	1	Russia	Grigory Tarasevich (23.80); Oleg Kostin (26.03); Daniil Pakhomov (22.40); Aleksei Brianskiy (21.02)	1:33.25	Q
2	3	3	Belarus	Pavel Sankovich (23.32); Ilya Shymanovich (25.92); Yauhen Tsurkin (22.67); Anton Latkin (21.57)	1:33.48	Q
3	3	7	China	Xu Jiayu (23.46); Yan Zibei (26.11); Li Zhuhao (22.93); Yu Hexin (21.45)	1:33.95	Q
4	2	6	Japan	Junya Koga (23.68); Yoshiki Yamanaka (26.54); Takeshi Kawamoto (22.56); Kenta Ito (21.23)	1:34.01	Q
5	3	8	Australia	Robert Hurley (23.63); Tommy Sucipto (26.56); David Morgan (22.31); Brayden McCarthy (21.74)	1:34.24	Q
6	2	8	United States	Matthew Josa (23.84); Michael Andrew (26.62); Tom Shields (22.70); Paul Powers (21.10)	1:34.26	Q
7	3	1	Lithuania	Danas Rapsys (24.28); Giedrius Titenis (26.51); Mindaugas Sadauskas (22.71); Simonas Bilis (20.80)	1:34.30	Q
8	2	4	Sweden	Jesper Björk (24.77); Johannes Skagius (25.78); Simon Sjödin (22.77); Christoffer Carlsen (21.70)	1:35.02	Q
9	3	2	France	Thomas Avetand (24.96); Jean Dencausse (26.75); Jérémy Stravius (22.29); Yonel Govindin (21.38)	1:35.38	
10	1	4	Canada	Jeremy Bagshaw (25.27); Jason Block (26.66); Mackenzie Darragh (23.91); Mirando Richard-Jarry (22.05)	1:37.89	
11	1	6	Iceland	Kristinn Porarinsson (25.17); Viktor Mani Vilbergsson (27.51); David Adalsteinsson (23.77); Aron Orn Steffansson (22.21)	1:38.66	
12	1	2	South Africa	Ricky Ellis (25.16); Alaric Basson (27.90); Alard Basson (24.38); Myles Brown (22.01)	1:39.45	
13	1	3	Hong Kong	Ho Lun Raymond Mak (25.98); Hoi Tun Raymond Tsui (27.97); Chun Nam Derick Ng (23.79); Kin Tat Kent Cheung (22.82)	1:40.56	
14	3	4	Macau	Pok Man Ngou (25.70); Man Hou Chao (27.06); Ka Kun Sio (24.99); Sizhuang Lin (23.84)	1:41.59	
15	3	5	Macedonia	Gorazd Chepishevski (25.77); Damjan Petrovski (29.64); Ljupcho Angelovski (24.69); Marko Blazhevski (22.55)	1:42.65	
16	2	3	Papua New Guinea	Ryan Pini (24.56); Ashley Seeto (29.03); Stanford Kawale (26.28); Sam Seghers (24.12)	1:43.99	
17	1	0	Philippines	Axel Toni Steven Ngui (27.43); James Deiparine (27.72); Jeremy Bryan Lim (26.02); Alfonso José Bautista (24.06)	1:43.99	
	1	1	Singapore			DNS
	1	5	Czech Republic			DNS
	1	7	Kenya			DNS
	1	8	Italy			DNS
	2	0	Seychelles			DNS
	2	5	Dominican Republic			DNS
	2	7	Albania			DNS
	3	0	Angola			DNS
	3	6	Venezuela			DNS
	2	2	Paraguay	Charles Hockin (24.52); Renato Prono (26.58); Ivo Kunzle Savastano (25.06); Benjamin Hockin		DSQ

=== Final ===
The final was held at 18:30.

Rank	Lane	Nation	Swimmers	Time	Notes
1st place, gold medalist(s)	4	Russia	Andrei Shabasov (23.46); Kirill Prigoda (25.52); Aleksandr Popkov (22.08); Vladimir Morozov (20.46)	1:31.52	
2nd place, silver medalist(s)	7	United States	Jacob Pebley (23.54); Cody Miller (25.68); Tom Shields (21.94); Michael Chadwick (20.81)	1:31.97	
3rd place, bronze medalist(s)	5	Belarus	Pavel Sankovich (23.05); Ilya Shymanovich (25.82); Yauhen Tsurkin (22.59); Anton Latkin (21.03)	1:32.49	
4	6	Japan	Junya Koga (22.98); Yoshiki Yamanaka (26.63); Takeshi Kawamoto (22.15); Kenta Ito (20.86)	1:32.62	
5	2	Australia	Robert Hurley (23.64); Tommy Sucipto (26.40); David Morgan (22.22); Tommaso D'Orsogna (21.03)	1:33.29	
6	3	China	Xu Jiayu (23.53); Yan Zibei (26.29); Li Zhuhao (22.97); Yu Hexin (21.19)	1:33.98	
7	8	Sweden	Jesper Björk (24.65); Johannes Skagius (25.59); Simon Sjödin (22.91); Cristoffer Carlsen (21.25)	1:34.40	
8	1	Lithuania	Danas Rapsys (24.24); Giedrius Titenis (26.38); Deividas Margevicius (23.28); Mindaugas Sadauskas (21.10)	1:35.00	
