= Swimming at the 2014 European Aquatics Championships – Men's 100 metre butterfly =

Men's 100 metre butterfly at the Swimming at the 2014 European Aquatics Championships
- Dates: 22–23 August
- Competitors: 54 from 29 nations
- Winning time: 51.38

Medalists
gold medal	Konrad Czerniak	Poland
silver medal	László Cseh	Hungary
bronze medal	Pavel Sankovich	Belarus

The Men's 100 metre butterfly competition of the 2014 European Aquatics Championships was held on 22–23 August.

== Records ==
Prior to the competition, the existing world, European and championship records were as follows.

	Name	Nation	Time	Location	Date
World record	Michael Phelps	United States	49.82	Rome	1 August 2009
European record	Milorad Čavić	Serbia	49.95	Rome	1 August 2009
Championship record	Milorad Čavić	Serbia	51.45	Debrecen	26 May 2012

== Results ==
=== Heats ===
The heats were held at 10:00.

Rank	Heat	Lane	Name	Nationality	Time	Notes
1	6	4	László Cseh	Hungary	52.14	Q
2	4	4	Steffen Deibler	Germany	52.22	Q
3	5	4	Konrad Czerniak	Poland	52.26	Q
4	5	3	Paweł Korzeniowski	Poland	52.35	Q
5	4	7	Pavel Sankovich	Belarus	52.40	Q
6	6	6	Adam Barrett	Great Britain	52.42	Q
7	6	5	Evgeny Korotyshkin	Russia	52.51	Q
8	4	3	Nikita Konovalov	Russia	52.65	Q
9	4	6	Joeri Verlinden	Netherlands	52.72	Q
10	6	3	Yauhen Tsurkin	Belarus	52.74	Q
11	5	6	Ivan Lenđer	Serbia	52.76	Q
12	5	7	Bence Pulai	Hungary	52.78	Q
13	4	2	Mehdy Metella	France	52.79	Q
14	6	7	Piero Codia	Italy	52.92	Q
15	6	1	Marcin Cieślak	Poland	52.99	
15	5	5	Viacheslav Prudnikov	Russia	52.99	
17	4	0	Viktor Bromer	Denmark	53.18	Q
18	6	2	Evgeny Koptelov	Russia	53.19	
19	4	5	Matteo Rivolta	Italy	53.26	Q
20	4	8	Alexandru Coci	Romania	53.32	
21	4	1	Mario Todorović	Croatia	53.42	
22	5	9	Jan Šefl	Czech Republic	53.61	
23	5	1	François Heersbrandt	Belgium	53.64	
23	3	0	Simon Sjödin	Sweden	53.64	
25	5	0	Andreas Vazaios	Greece	53.65	
26	6	9	Jordan Coelho	France	53.70	
27	5	2	Nico van Duijn	Switzerland	53.73	
28	6	0	Jan Świtkowski	Poland	53.74	
29	6	8	Stefanos Dimitriadis	Greece	53.85	
30	3	6	Paul Lemaire	France	53.95	
31	2	5	Tuomas Pokkinen	Finland	53.96	
32	3	5	Tadas Duškinas	Lithuania	53.97	
33	2	6	Sindri Jakobsson	Norway	53.99	
34	3	2	Deividas Margevičius	Lithuania	54.03	
35	5	8	Tom Kremer	Israel	54.05	
36	3	3	Bence Biczó	Hungary	54.06	
37	4	9	Robert Žbogar	Slovenia	54.11	
38	3	4	Nimrod Shapira Bar-Or	Israel	54.33	
39	2	8	Diogo Carvalho	Portugal	54.54	
40	3	8	Riku Poeytaekivi	Finland	54.70	
40	2	0	Alexander Nyström	Sweden	54.70	
42	2	4	Konstantinos Markozis	Greece	54.72	
43	3	7	Filip Milcevic	Austria	54.74	
44	1	6	Martin Liivamägi	Estonia	54.91	
45	3	1	Nuno Quintanilha	Portugal	55.08	
46	2	2	Jesper Björk	Sweden	55.09	
47	1	4	Teimuraz Kobakhidze	Georgia	55.21	
48	2	3	Tomáš Havránek	Czech Republic	55.43	
49	3	9	Brendan Hyland	Ireland	55.52	
50	1	3	Etay Gurevich	Israel	55.55	
51	2	9	Igor Kozlovskij	Lithuania	55.81	
52	2	1	Nikša Stojkovski	Croatia	55.93	
53	1	5	Ensar Hajder	Bosnia and Herzegovina	56.03	
54	2	7	Daniel Skaaning	Denmark	56.45	

=== Semifinals ===
The semifinals were held at 18:28.

==== Semifinal 1 ====
Rank	Lane	Name	Nationality	Time	Notes
1	3	Adam Barrett	Great Britain	51.80	Q
2	4	Steffen Deibler	Germany	51.81	Q
3	5	Paweł Korzeniowski	Poland	52.07	Q
4	6	Nikita Konovalov	Russia	52.11	Q
5	2	Yauhen Tsurkin	Belarus	52.27	
6	1	Piero Codia	Italy	52.40	
7	8	Matteo Rivolta	Italy	52.62	
8	7	Bence Pulai	Hungary	52.66	

==== Semifinal 2 ====
Rank	Lane	Name	Nationality	Time	Notes
1	5	Konrad Czerniak	Poland	51.58	Q
2	3	Pavel Sankovich	Belarus	51.83	Q
3	2	Joeri Verlinden	Netherlands	52.10	Q
4	1	Mehdy Metella	France	52.20	
4	4	László Cseh	Hungary	52.20	
6	6	Evgeny Korotyshkin	Russia	52.50	
7	7	Ivan Lenđer	Serbia	52.59	
8	8	Viktor Bromer	Denmark	52.83	

==== Swim-off ====
The swim-off was held at 19:55.

Rank	Lane	Name	Nationality	Time	Notes
1	4	László Cseh	Hungary	51.73	Q
2	5	Mehdy Metella	France	51.96	

=== Final ===
The final was held at 16:27.

Rank	Lane	Name	Nationality	Time	Notes
1st place, gold medalist(s)	4	Konrad Czerniak	Poland	51.38	CR
2nd place, silver medalist(s)	8	László Cseh	Hungary	51.89	
3rd place, bronze medalist(s)	6	Pavel Sankovich	Belarus	51.92	
4	5	Adam Barrett	Great Britain	51.95	
5	3	Steffen Deibler	Germany	52.01	
6	2	Paweł Korzeniowski	Poland	52.15	
7	7	Joeri Verlinden	Netherlands	52.17	
8	1	Nikita Konovalov	Russia	52.40	
