= Michael Andrew (swimmer) =

American swimmer (born 1999)

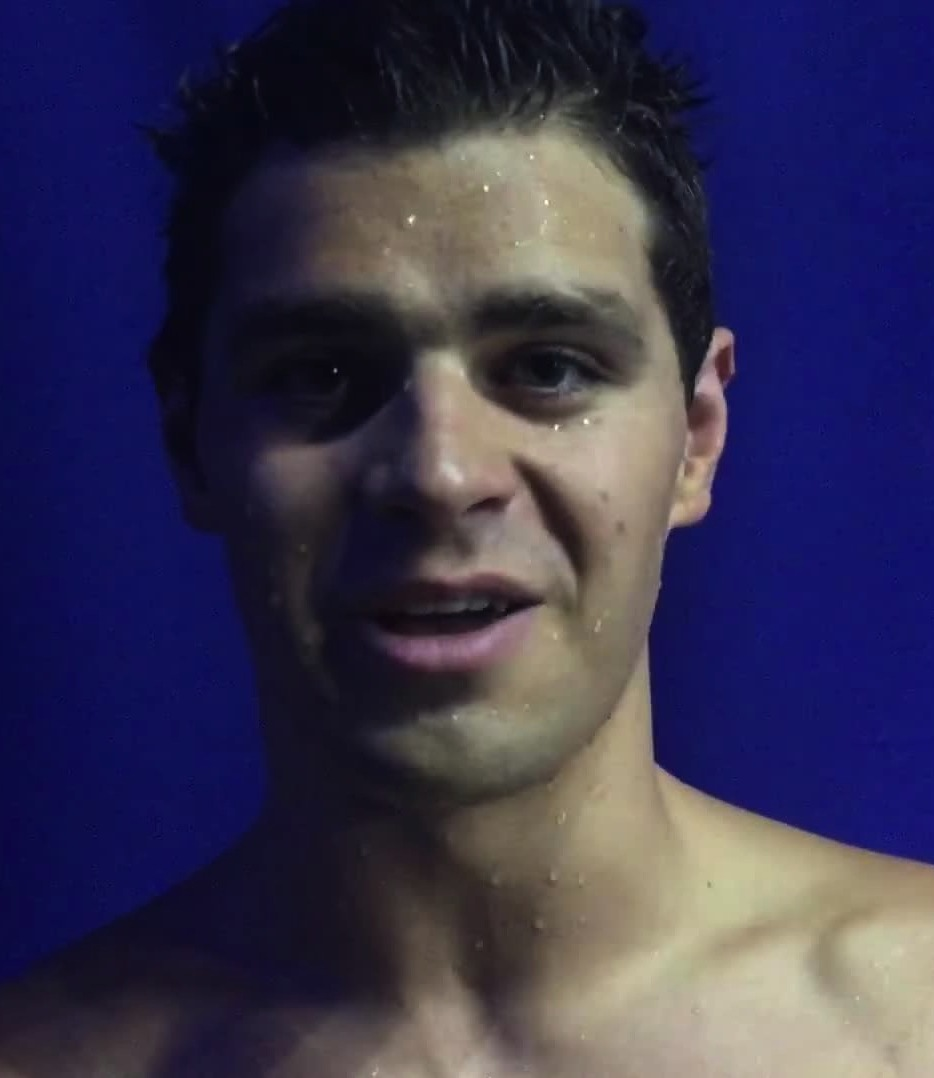
- Andrew in 2018

Personal information
- Full name: Michael Charles Andrew
- Nickname: Lawrence
- National team: United States
- Born: April 18, 1999 (age 27) Edina, Minnesota, U.S.
- Height: 6 ft 6 in (198 cm)
- Weight: 205 lb (93 kg)

Sport
- Sport: Swimming
- Strokes: Backstroke, breaststroke, butterfly, freestyle, individual medley
- Coach: Herbie Behm
Medal record
Men's swimming
Representing the United States
Event	1st	2nd	3rd
Olympic Games	1	0	0
World Championships (LC)	1	4	2
World Championships (SC)	6	5	2
Pan Pacific Championships	1	0	1
World Junior Championships	4	3	3
Total	13	12	8
Olympic Games
Gold medal – first place	2020 Tokyo	4×100 m medley
World Championships (LC)
Gold medal – first place	2022 Budapest	4×100 m mixed medley
Silver medal – second place	2019 Gwangju	4×100 m medley
Silver medal – second place	2022 Budapest	50 m freestyle
Silver medal – second place	2022 Budapest	4×100 m medley
Silver medal – second place	2024 Doha	50 m butterfly
Bronze medal – third place	2022 Budapest	50 m butterfly
Bronze medal – third place	2022 Budapest	50 m breaststroke
World Championships (SC)
Gold medal – first place	2016 Windsor	100 m medley
Gold medal – first place	2018 Hangzhou	4×50 m freestyle
Gold medal – first place	2018 Hangzhou	4×100 m medley
Gold medal – first place	2018 Hangzhou	4×50 m mixed freestyle
Gold medal – first place	2018 Hangzhou	4×50 m mixed medley
Gold medal – first place	2022 Melbourne	4×50 m mixed medley
Silver medal – second place	2016 Windsor	4×50 m freestyle
Silver medal – second place	2016 Windsor	4×50 m medley
Silver medal – second place	2018 Hangzhou	4×50 m medley
Silver medal – second place	2022 Melbourne	4×50 m medley
Silver medal – second place	2024 Budapest	4×100 m medley
Bronze medal – third place	2018 Hangzhou	100 m medley
Bronze medal – third place	2024 Budapest	4×50 m mixed medley
Pan Pacific Championships
Gold medal – first place	2018 Tokyo	50 m freestyle
Bronze medal – third place	2018 Tokyo	4×100 m mixed medley
World Junior Championships
Gold medal – first place	2015 Singapore	50 m backstroke
Gold medal – first place	2017 Indianapolis	50 m freestyle
Gold medal – first place	2017 Indianapolis	50 m backstroke
Gold medal – first place	2017 Indianapolis	50 m butterfly
Silver medal – second place	2015 Singapore	50 m freestyle
Silver medal – second place	2015 Singapore	50 m butterfly
Silver medal – second place	2015 Singapore	4×100 m medley
Bronze medal – third place	2015 Singapore	4×100 m mixed medley
Bronze medal – third place	2017 Indianapolis	50 m breaststroke
Bronze medal – third place	2017 Indianapolis	100 m breaststroke
Junior Pan Pac Championships
Silver medal – second place	2014 Maui	100 m backstroke

NBC Sports: Andrew sets 100 m breaststroke American record, 2nd time in one day

Michael Charles Andrew (born April 18, 1999) is an American competitive swimmer and an Olympic gold medalist. He was the 2016 world champion in the 100 meter individual medley. At his first Olympic Games, the 2020 Summer Olympics, he won a gold medal and set a world record as part of the 4x100 meter medley relay, placed fourth in the 100 meter breaststroke, fourth in the 50 meter freestyle, and fifth in the 200 meter individual medley. Andrew's swims in 2021 at the 2020 Olympics made him the first swimmer to represent the United States at an Olympic Games in an individual breaststroke event as well as another individual event other than an individual medley in the then-125-year-history of swimming at the Summer Olympics. He has won 89 medals at Swimming World Cup circuits.

In 2017, Andrew became the first person to achieve three world junior records in one session at a World Junior Swimming Championships. At the 2019 World Aquatics Championships, he became the first male swimmer to final in all four strokes, backstroke, breaststroke, butterfly, and freestyle, in the 50 meter events at a single World Aquatics Championships. At the 2022 World Aquatics Championships, he won three medals in individual events, a silver medal in the 50 meter freestyle, a bronze medal in the 50 meter breaststroke, and a bronze medal in the 50 meter butterfly.

Andrew is the world junior record holder in the 50 meter freestyle and a former holder of world junior records in the 50 meter backstroke, 50 meter butterfly, 100 meter breaststroke, and 200 meter individual medley in long course meters. He is also a world record and Olympic record holder in the long course 4x100 meter medley relay, in which he swam breaststroke, along with Ryan Murphy (backstroke), Caeleb Dressel (butterfly), and Zach Apple (freestyle). Over the course of his career, Andrew has also achieved multiple continental and national records in the 50 meter breaststroke and 100 meter breaststroke events.

== Teen life ==
Andrew's parents, Peter and Tina, are South African citizens who moved to the United States in 1997. His father served in the South African Navy as a diver. His mother appeared in the British and South African versions of Gladiators, as Laser and Sheena respectively, and his younger sister used to swim.

His family lived in Aberdeen, South Dakota, from 1997 to 2011, where Andrew started swimming at age 7 and competed for the Aberdeen Swim Club. Soon after, Andrew's father decided he wanted to coach Andrew himself so his parents bought and converted a nightclub in Aberdeen into a four-lane pool so Andrew could train with Peter as coach, then purchased the building next door and made it into their home. The family moved to Lawrence, Kansas, in 2011. As the house in Lawrence did not come with a pool, they built a shed and a two-lane training pool in the backyard where Andrew was coached by his father. In 2013, Andrew turned professional at the age of 14 and became the youngest American swimmer to do so. As a junior swimmer he broke more than 100 National Age Group records (long course meters and short course yards combined), more than any other American swimmer. Part of Andrew's coaching by his father during his youth included training in a non-traditional way, using a method called Ultra Short Race Pace Training (USRPT), he has continued to train with this approach into adulthood.

Andrew was home-schooled as part of an online program through Liberty University for part of his teenage years after he turned pro in swimming. Taking a home-schooling pathway for education, he chose not to compete in high school nor collegiate swimming. When the University opened a pool in 2018, Andrew participated in the first event held at the pool, the 2018 TYR Junior National Cup, to be part of its grand opening.

== 2014–2017: International career beginnings ==
=== 2014 Junior Pan Pacific Championships ===
At the 2014 Junior Pan Pacific Swimming Championships, in August in Maui, Hawaii, Andrew won the silver medal in the 100 meter backstroke with a time of 55.81 seconds, placed ninth in the 100 meter butterfly and the 50 meter freestyle, 20th in the 200 meter individual medley, 22nd in the 100 meter freestyle and the 100 meter breaststroke, and swam exhibition in the 4×100 meter freestyle relay and the 4×100 meter medley relay.

=== 2015: International debut ===
==== 2015 World Junior Championships ====
2015 World Junior Championships
Gold medal – first place	50 m backstroke	25.23 (CR)
Silver medal – second place	50 m freestyle	22.36
Silver medal – second place	50 m butterfly	23.84
Silver medal – second place	4×100 m medley relay	3:37.51
Bronze medal – third place	4×100 m mixed medley relay	3:50.24

In August 2015, Andrew made his international debut when he was 16 years old at the 2015 FINA World Junior Swimming Championships in Singapore. He competed in ten events, eight individual and two relays, reached the semifinals or final in all ten events, competed in the final in nine events, and won medals in five events. He won the gold medal in the 50 meter backstroke, breaking the Championships record in both the heats and the final. He also won the silver medal in the 50 meter freestyle and the 50 meter butterfly, placed 4th in the 100 meter backstroke, 4th in the 100 meter breaststroke, 7th in the 200 meter individual medley, 8th in the 50 meter breaststroke, and 9th in the 100 meter butterfly. For his two relay events, Andrew won a silver medal as part of the men's 4×100 meter medley relay where he swam backstroke in the prelims and butterfly in the final and a bronze medal on the mixed 4×100 meter medley relay where he swam the breaststroke leg of the relay in the final. FINA named him male swimmer of the meet.

=== 2016: First world title ===
==== 2016 US Olympic Trials ====
Andrew competed in his first Olympic Trials at the 2016 USA Swimming Olympic Trials in Omaha, Nebraska when he was 17 years old. He swam in five individual events: 50 meter freestyle, 100 meter freestyle, 100 meter breaststroke, 100 meter butterfly, and 200 meter individual medley. While he did not make the USA Olympic Team for the 2016 Summer Olympics in Rio de Janeiro, Brazil, Andrew was closest to making the team in the 100 meter breaststroke where he finished in fourth place. With his swim of 59.96 seconds in the prelims heats of the 100 meter breaststroke, Andrew became the youngest American to swim the event in less than one minute, set a National Age Group record in the event, and broke the world junior record of 1:00.12 in the event set by Anton Chupkov of Russia. Andrew lowered his National Age Group and world junior records in the final of the 100 meter breaststroke by swimming the race in 59.82 seconds. His time of 1:59.44 in the 200 meter individual medley semifinals tied the world junior record in the event set in 2013 by Gunnar Bentz.

==== 2016 World Short Course Championships ====
2016 World Short Course Championships
Gold medal – first place	100 m individual medley	51.84
Silver medal – second place	4×50 m freestyle relay	1:24.47 (h)
Silver medal – second place	4×50 m medley relay	1:31.97 (h)

At the 2016 World Swimming Championships held in Windsor, Canada in December 2016 and conducted in short course meters, Andrew won the gold medal and his first individual world title at a world championships meet open to all ages in the 100 meter individual medley with a time of 51.84. He finished 17 hundredths of a second ahead of 2016 Olympic medalist Daiya Seto of Japan who finished second. In the 50 meter breaststroke he finished ninth in the semifinals and did not advance to the final. Likewise, Andrew placed 23rd in the 200 meter individual medley prelims with a time of 1:57.87 and split a 21.44 on the mixed 4×50 meter freestyle relay that placed 11th in the prelims, he did not advance to the next stage of competition in either event. He also contributed to the heats in the 4×50 meter freestyle relay and the 4×50 meter medley relay, winning silver medals in both. He swam a 21.51 for his 50 meters in the 4×50 meter freestyle relay and a 26.62 for his 50 meters of breaststroke in the 4×50 meter medley relay.

=== 2017: Breaking long course world junior records ===
On March 4, 2017, Andrew broke the world junior record in the 200 meter individual medley at the 2017 Arena Pro Swim Series in Indianapolis with his time of 1:59.12 in the final.

==== 2017 World Junior Championships ====
2017 World Junior Championships
Gold medal – first place	50 m freestyle	21.75 (WJ, CR)
Gold medal – first place	50 m backstroke	24.63 (WJ, CR)
Gold medal – first place	50 m butterfly	23.22 (WJ, CR)
Bronze medal – third place	50 m breaststroke	27.39
Bronze medal – third place	100 m breaststroke	1:00.37

At the 2017 FINA World Junior Swimming Championships in Indianapolis in August 2017, Andrew won three gold medals and two bronze medals. In the prelims of the 50 meter freestyle, Andrew broke the world junior record of 22.00, set in the event by Yu Hexin in 2014, with his time of 21.75. In the final of the 50 meter freestyle, Andrew swam a 21.75 again, tied his world junior record, and won the gold medal in the event. For the 50 meter backstroke, Andrew broke the world junior record set by Kliment Kolesnikov at 24.94 in 2016 with a time of 24.63 in the prelims. Andrew tied his world junior record of 24.63 in the final of the 50 meter backstroke and won the gold medal. In the 50 meter butterfly semifinals, Andrew swam a 23.27 and broke the world junior record of 23.39 set by Li Zhuhao in 2015. In the final, Andrew lowered the world junior record he set in the semifinal to a 23.22 and won the gold medal. In the final of the 50 meter breaststroke he swam a 27.39 and won the bronze medal, and in the 100 meter breaststroke final he won the bronze medal with a time of 1:00.37.

Andrew's swims in the evening of August 26, 2017, setting world junior records in the 50 meter backstroke, 50 meter butterfly, and 50 meter freestyle, made him the first swimmer in the world to achieve three world junior records in one session at a FINA World Junior Swimming Championships meet. The time span for Andrew achieving these three records was less than one hour. In addition to the five events he medalled in, Andrew placed 8th in the 200 meter individual medley and 4th in the 4×100 freestyle relay for his prelims relay contributions.

==== 2017 Swimming World Cup ====
At the Beijing stop of the 2017 Swimming World Cup in November 2017, Andrew set a world junior record in the short course 100 meter individual medley with his time of 51.86 seconds and finished second overall. The following week at the World Cup stop in Singapore, Andrew lowered the world junior record to 51.65 seconds. Andrew shared video footage of the race on his YouTube channel later the same month. Also in Singapore, Andrew helped set a new world junior record in the mixed 4x50 meter medley relay, splitting a 26.02 for the breaststroke leg of the relay in the final.

== 2018–2021: Transitioning to senior competition ==
=== 2018: National to international ascent ===
==== 2018 National Championships ====
Andrew won multiple individual events at the 2018 Phillips 66 National Championships in Irvine, California in July 2018. He won the final of the 50 meter butterfly in a time of 22.93, which broke the Championship record of 23.05 set by Caeleb Dressel in 2017. For the 50 meter breaststroke, Andrew tied the US Open record of 26.86 set by Adam Peaty in 2017 and set a new Championship record in the prelims. In the final of the 50 meter breaststroke, Andrew won the event with a time of 26.84 and set a new US Open record. In the 100 meter breaststroke, Andrew won in a time of 59.38 seconds. Andrew won the final of the 50 meter freestyle with a 21.49, which was less than four tenths of a second ahead of second place finisher Caeleb Dressel and third place finisher Nathan Adrian. He also finished in third place in the 100 meter butterfly with a time of 51.68, placed fourth in the 50 meter backstroke in a time of 24.62, and swam a 49.87 and placed 26th in the 100 meter freestyle.

NBC Sports named Andrew male swimmer of the meet. He also received press coverage from ESPN who highlighted Andrew's winning four national titles spanning breaststroke, butterfly, and freestyle events. His wins qualified him for the 2018 Pan Pacific Championships and the 2019 World Championships, which was his first time qualifying for a senior long course team at an international swimming competition.

==== 2018 Pan Pacific Championships ====
2018 Pan Pacific Championships
Gold medal – first place	50 m freestyle	21.46
Bronze medal – third place	4x100 m mixed medley relay	3:41.74

At the 2018 Pan Pacific Championships held in Tokyo, Japan in August, Andrew won two medals. He swam a time of 21.46 seconds in the 50 meter freestyle, finished over four tenths of a second before the next fastest swimmer, Caeleb Dressel also of the United States, and won the gold medal. As part of the mixed 4x100 meter medley relay with Kathleen Baker (backstroke), Caeleb Dressel (butterfly), and Simone Manuel (freestyle), Andrew won a bronze medal. Andrew attributed his gold medal in the 50 meter freestyle to his training method, USRPT. In addition to the events he medaled in, Andrew placed seventh in the final, also called the A final, of the 100 meter breaststroke in a time of 1:00.04, placed first place in the B-final, which was 9th overall, in the 100 meter backstroke with a time of 53.55, and also won the B-final of the 100 meter butterfly with his time of 51.53 seconds.

For his performances at the 2018 National Championships and Pan Pacific Championships, Andrew was nominated for the USA Swimming Golden Goggle Award for "Breakout Performer of the Year", and for his execution in the 50 meter freestyle race at the Pan Pacific Championships he was nominated for the "Male Race of the Year" Golden Goggle Award. He won the award "Breakout Performer of the Year", winning one of the two awards he was nominated for.

==== 2018 Swimming World Cup ====
In November, Andrew competed at the 2018 Swimming World Cup stop in Beijing, China, tying the American record of 26.15 seconds in the short course 50 meter breaststroke set by Cody Miller. Later in the World Cup circuit, at the Singapore stop, he set new American records in the short course 50 meter breaststroke and 50 meter butterfly. His time of 26.10 seconds in the 50 meter breaststroke broke the American record of 26.15 seconds set by him and Cody Miller. For the 50 meter butterfly, Andrew lowered the American record from the time of 22.38 seconds set by Tom Shields in 2016 to 22.32 seconds in the final after first breaking the record with his time of 22.37 seconds in the prelims heats of the event.

==== 2018 World Short Course Championships ====
2018 World Short Course Championships
Gold medal – first place	4×50 m mixed freestyle relay	1:27.89 (h)
Gold medal – first place	4×50 m mixed medley relay	1:36.40 (WR, CR)
Gold medal – first place	4×50 m freestyle relay	1:34.03 (h)
Gold medal – first place	4×100 m medley relay	3:19.98 (h)
Silver medal – second place	4×50 m medley relay	1:30.90 (NR)
Bronze medal – third place	100 m individual medley	51.58

At the 2018 World Swimming Championships swam in short course meters in Hangzhou, China in December, Andrew competed in a total of ten events and won five medals in relay events, four gold medals and one silver medal, and one medal in an individual event, a bronze medal in the 100 meter individual medley where he was the only male swimmer from the United States who was entered to compete in the event. For his other four events, Andrew placed 10th in the 100 meter breaststroke with a time of 57.24 seconds, 10th in the 50 meter freestyle at 21.18 seconds, 11th in the 50 meter butterfly in 22.81 seconds, and 18th in the 50 meter breaststroke with a time of 26.62 seconds.

In the final of the mixed 4x50 meter medley relay, Andrew swam the breaststroke leg of the relay and with his relay teammates Olivia Smoliga (backstroke), Kelsi Dahlia (butterfly), and Caeleb Dressel (freestyle), helped set a new world record time of 1:36.40 in the event. Andrew also swam the breaststroke leg of the 4x50 meter medley relay where he won a silver medal and helped set a new American record in the event with finals relay teammates Ryan Murphy (backstroke), Caeleb Dressel (butterfly), and Ryan Held (freestyle). Swimming in the prelims heats of the mixed 4x50 meter freestyle relay, 4x50 meter freestyle relay, and 4x100 meter medley relay, Andrew helped advance each relay to the final of each event and won a gold medal in each race when the finals relays won.

=== 2019: Finalling in 50 meter sprints ===
==== 2019 World Long Course Championships ====
2019 World Long Course Championships
Silver medal – second place	4x100 m medley relay	3:28.45 (h)

Andrew became the first man to make it to the finals in the 50 meter events for all four strokes at a World Championships meet in July 2019 at the 2019 World Aquatics Championships held in Gwangju, South Korea. In the finals he placed 4th in the 50 meter butterfly, 5th in the 50 meter backstroke, 6th in the 50 meter freestyle, and 7th in the 50 meter breaststroke. He earned one medal at the meet, a silver medal in the 4x100 meter medley relay where he swam a 59.75 for the breaststroke leg of the relay in the prelims heats. In his individual event at the 100 meter distance, Andrew ranked 19th with a time of 1:00:04 in the 100 meter breaststroke.

==== International Swimming League ====
In fall 2019, Andrew was a member of the inaugural season of the International Swimming League, swimming for the New York Breakers who competed in the Americas Division. In addition to being a swimmer for the team, Andrew shared the role of co-owner of the New York Breakers with his parents. At the American Final, in College Park, Maryland, he won the 50 meter backstroke, tying with LA Current swimmer Matt Grevers. For the 2019 season, Andrew's performances earned him the Most Valuable Player designation for the New York Breakers.

=== 2020: Pandemic disrupts competition ===
Rebounding from his 19th place finish at the 2019 World Championships, Andrew swam a personal best time of 59.14 seconds in the 100 meter breaststroke to win the final at the 2020 TYR Pro Swim Series meet in Des Moines, Iowa in March 2020. At the same meet he also improved his best times in the 200 meter individual medley and 100 meter butterfly. Later in the month, when the 2020 Olympic Games were postponed to 2021 due to the COVID-19 pandemic, Andrew continued training after a six to seven week break from swimming in a pool. One of the ways Andrew adapted to the hiatus in international swimming competition was by experimenting and posting videos of his daily life as a professional swimmer on his YouTube channel.

==== International Swimming League ====
Andrew served as a team captain for the New York Breakers in the 2020 International Swimming League.

=== 2021: Olympic Games debut ===
==== Olympic Trials build-up ====
Andrew breaks 100 m butterfly Pro Swim Series record

At the 2021 TYR Pro Swim Series meet in Indianapolis, Andrew swam and won three individual events. On Thursday May 13, 2021, Andrew competed in the 100 meter breaststroke, swimming a personal best in the finals with a time of 58.67 and setting a new U.S. Open record and a new Pro Swim Series record for the event. His swim was the second fastest time in the 100 meter breaststroke long course event in the history of the US. The next day, Friday May 14, 2021, Andrew set another Pro Swim Series record this time in the 100 meter butterfly with a time of 50.80. Saturday May 15, 2021, he won the 200 individual medley swimming a 1:56.84. His swims drew the attention of SwimSwam who chose Andrew as their “Ultra Swim Swimmer of the Month” for the month of May 2021 because of his achievements in his breaststroke, butterfly, and individual medley races and his potential for making the US Olympic Team for the 2020 Olympic Games.

Heading into the 2020 USA Swimming Olympic Trials, Andrew qualified to compete in seven individual events including the 50 meter freestyle, 100 meter freestyle, 100 meter backstroke, 100 meter breaststroke, 200 meter breaststroke, 100 meter butterfly, and 200 meter individual medley. He qualified for the 200 meter breaststroke in April 2021 at the TYR Pro Swim Series meet in Mission Viejo where he swam a 2:11.32 in the final of his debut racing the event, which was over three seconds faster than the Wave II trials qualification time.

As part of press coverage leading up to the 2020 Olympic Trials (held in June 2021 due to the COVID-19 pandemic), SwimSwam named Andrew as their top pick in the men's 100 meter breaststroke. Attempting to predict the results, Sports Illustrated selected Andrew as finishing first in the 100 meter breaststroke, second in the 100 meter butterfly, and second in the 200 meter individual medley. Sports Illustrated also listed Andrew as one of two potential breakthrough performers to follow at the meet along with Regan Smith. Andrew also garnered attention from ABC Sport regarding his stance on FINA and potential bans on swimmers participating in the International Swimming League in relation to discussions of prize money for swimmers at the Olympic Games.

Andrew entered to swim six events at the Olympic Trials, the seven events he qualified to swim minus the 200 meter breaststroke. In the Omega Timing records book published on June 13, 2021, and containing a list of current American Records, Championship Records, US Open Records, and World Records, Andrew was the only male to have set one of these records (the US Open record in the 100 meter breaststroke) in 2021.

==== 2020 US Olympic Trials ====
On day one of the USA Olympic Trials, June 13, 2021, Andrew swam a 58.19 in the morning prelims for the 100 meter breaststroke, coming in as the fastest swimmer for the prelims heats and setting a new American Record, US Open Record, and Championship Record in the process. His swim also moved him up in rankings to the third fastest swimmer in the event all-time globally and all-time fastest American. In the semifinals for the 100 meter breaststroke the same day, Andrew swam a 58.14, ranking as #1 out of all semifinals swimmers for the event and breaking his own American Record, US Open Record, and Championship Record he set in the prelims. Additionally, the first 50 meters of his 100 meter breaststroke clocked in at 26.83 seconds, which broke the former US Open record in the 50 meter breaststroke he set at 26.84 seconds in 2018. Both Andrew and second fastest swimmer in the semifinals, Nic Fink, dropped substantial time in the prelims and semifinals, advancing to the finals the next day. Andrew's setting the American record twice in one day was an NBC Olympics highlight from day one of the Olympic Trials. According to NBC Sports, Andrew's swims on day one of the Olympic Trials in the prelims and semifinals where he set an American record in each swim was a first for anyone to do so.

In the morning on day two of the Olympic Trials, Monday June 14, 2021, Andrew swam a 53.66 in the prelims of the 100 meter backstroke, ranking 7th out of all heats. Competing in his first final of the 2020 Olympic Trials in the evening of day two, Andrew swam a 58.73 in the 100 meter breaststroke, ranking #1 for the event. He qualified for the US Olympic Swimming Team in the 100 meter breaststroke, this was his first time qualifying to compete at an Olympic Games. Two events later, Andrew swam a 53.82 in the 100 meter backstroke semifinals, ranking #8, and qualifying for the final. Andrew making his first US Olympic Team and the 2020 Summer Olympics with the 100 meter breaststroke was highlighted by local news, Aberdeen News and FOX4, swimming news, SwimSwam, and national news, NBC Olympics and NBC Sports.

Day three of competition, Andrew competed in the final of the 100 meter backstroke in the evening, swimming a 53.59 and ranking 8th.

In the prelims of the 200 meter individual medley June 17, 2021, Andrew swam a 1:56.25, ranking first, and advancing to the semifinals. He dropped more than half a second off his former best time in the 200 meter individual medley with his swim, rising to number five fastest American swimmer in the event to that point in time. Andrew lowered his personal best time in the 200 meter individual medley in the semifinals, swimming a 1:55.26, ranking first for the semifinals heats, and advancing to the final the next day. His swim moved him from number five to number three all-time fastest American swimmer in the event as well as making him the fastest swimmer globally for the 2021 year up to then. Andrew also made the top five fastest swimmers all-time globally in the 200 meter individual medley, coming in at number five with his time of 1:55.26. In the final, Andrew finished first with a time of 1:55.44 and qualified for the 2020 Summer Olympics in the event, making it his second event to swim at the Olympic Games.

On the seventh day of competition, Andrew competed in the prelims heats of the 50 meter freestyle, swimming a 21.72, ranking second, and advancing to the semifinals later that day. He ranked second for both semifinals with a time of 21.55 and qualified for the final on day eight, the last day, of competition. Andrew swam a 21.48 in the final, took second place, and qualified to swim the 50 meter freestyle at the 2020 Summer Olympics. This marked the first time a swimmer for the United States qualified to compete individually at the Olympic Games both in breaststroke and an event other than an individual medley.

==== 2020 Summer Olympics ====
2020 Summer Olympics
Gold medal – first place	4x100 m medley relay	3:26.78 (WR)

Prior to the 2020 Summer Olympics, the US Olympic swim team trained together in Hawaii. Andrew filmed some of the typical activities the swimmers took part in during the training camp, edited them together into a vlog format, and shared the video publicly on his YouTube channel to provide viewers a perspective on what it is like to train as a swimmer on the US Olympic team in the time period between qualifying for and competing in an Olympic Games. Andrew was one of 45 entrants in the 200 meter individual medley, 50 entrants in the 100 meter breaststroke, and one of 72 entrants in the 50 meter freestyle at the Olympic Games in Tokyo, Japan.

On the first day of swimming competition, Saturday July 24, 2021, Andrew swam in his first race at an Olympic Games. He won the fifth heat in the prelims of the 100 meter breaststroke, ranked third overall with a time of 58.62, and advanced to the semifinals. In the semifinals on July 25, Andrew ranked fifth overall with a time of 58.99 and advanced to the final of the event. Andrew swam a 58.84 in the final and finished in fourth place ahead of his American teammate Andrew Wilson who tied for sixth place.

On day five, Andrew finished the 200 meter individual medley in the prelims heats with a time of 1:56.40, advancing to the semifinals ranked first overall. In his semifinal heat, Andrew finished second with a time of 1:57.08, which ranked him fourth for both semifinals heats and qualified him for the final of the event. In the final on day seven of competition, Andrew finished with a time of 1:57.31, and placed fifth overall in the 200 meter individual medley.

In the evening of day seven, Andrew ranked 11th in the prelims heats of the 50 meter freestyle and qualified for the semifinals with his time of 21.89. In the semifinals on day eight, Andrew swam a 21.67 and advanced to the final tied ranked for fifth.

On the final day of competition, Andrew took fourth place with a time of 21.60 in the 50 meter freestyle final. In the final of the 4x100 meter medley relay, Andrew swam the breaststroke leg of the relay and won the gold medal and set the world record and an Olympic record with his relay teammates Ryan Murphy, Caeleb Dressel, and Zach Apple in a time of 3:26.78. This was the first time Andrew won an Olympic medal. He swam a 58.49 for the breaststroke leg of the relay, lowering the split time from the previous world record, a 58.57 by Eric Shanteau in 2009, by eight hundredths of a second.

The relay wins by the United States swimmers, including Andrew in the 4x100 meter medley relay, were highlighted by Time magazine as an uplifting note to the 2020 Olympic Games saying, "The relay medals were a welcome boost on the final day, after a disappointing fifth place finish in the first-ever mixed medley relay the day before". Additionally, Andrew became the first athlete in swimming at the Summer Olympics for the United States, a 125 year history at the time of the Olympic Games in 2021, to compete in an individual breaststroke event and an individual non-breaststroke event that was not an individual medley. While Andrew's individual swims were historic for a swimmer of any gender, male, female, or transgender, representing the United States at the Olympic Games, he did not receive a nomination from the USA Swimming Foundation for an individual Golden Goggle Award for this accomplishment. Instead he was nominated for the Golden Goggle Award for "Relay Performance of the Year" for his contribution of lowering the world record split time on the breaststroke leg of the gold-medal-winning and world-record-setting 4x100 meter medley relay.

Andrew's swims throughout the Summer Olympics and at the meets in 2021 leading up to the Olympic Games earned him a spot on the 2021–2022 US National Team in four individual events, the 100 meter breaststroke, the 50 meter freestyle, the 200 meter individual medley, and the 100 meter butterfly. Andrew was the only male swimmer and one of seven total swimmers, six were female, for the United States to make the national team in four or more individual events for the year.

==== International Swimming League ====
Andrew remained one of the co-owners of the New York Breakers and decided not to compete as a swimmer in the 2021 International Swimming League season.

==== 2021 World Short Course Championships ====
For the 2021 World Short Course Championships in Abu Dhabi, United Arab Emirates starting December 16, Andrew entered to compete in six individual events, the 50 meter breaststroke, 100 meter breaststroke, 50 meter butterfly, 100 meter butterfly, 50 meter freestyle, and 100 meter individual medley. Andrew and his teammates for the Championships being announced ranked as number two, only behind Kyle Chalmers of Australia setting a new world record in the 100 meter freestyle, for "The Week That Was" honor from Swimming World for the week of November 1, 2021.

On day one of competition, Andrew qualified for the semifinals of the 100 meter breaststroke with a time of 57.54 seconds in the prelims heats, which ranked him eighth. He swam a 57.83 in the semifinals of the event, ranked 14th, and did not qualify for the final. Andrew ranked 33rd in the prelims heats of the 100 metre butterfly on day two with a time of 51.69 seconds and did not qualify for the semifinals. Day three, Andrew swam in the 100 meter individual medley prelims heats, not qualifying for the semifinals with his time of 53.04, which ranked him 17th overall. In the prelims heats of the 50 meter freestyle, Andrew qualified for the semifinals ranking 15th with a 21.52. In the semifinals Andrew did not qualify for the final, ranking 16th overall with his time of 21.63 seconds. On day four, Andrew decided not to compete in the 50 meter butterfly. The same day, Andrew and two other United States swimmers, Rhyan White and Michael Brinegar, officially withdrew from competition, which followed the withdrawal of teammates Lydia Jacoby and Katie Grimes one day earlier.

== 2022: Stabilizing senior competition ==
In February 2022, Andrew raced the 100 meter freestyle, 50 meter breaststroke, and 100 meter butterfly on the second day of competition of the 4th Copa Heller Cup in Querétaro, Mexico, notably winning the 50 meter breaststroke over Arno Kamminga of the Netherlands with a time of 27.19 seconds. In early March, Andrew swam a 59.05 at the 2022 Pro Swim Series stop in Westmont, Illinois to win the 100 meter breaststroke, finishing just 0.19 seconds off a Pro Swim Series record of 58.86 seconds set by Adam Peaty in 2017, though Andrew had already broken the record twice in May 2021, first with a 58.82 and then again with a 58.67. The next day he won the 100 meter butterfly with a time of 51.74, finishing 0.03 seconds ahead of second-place finisher Shaine Casas. He won the 50 meter freestyle with a 21.73 on the fourth and final day of competition.

=== 2022 International Team Trials ===
At the 2022 US International Team Trials in Greensboro, North Carolina, Andrew ranked first in the prelims heats of the 50 meter butterfly on day two with a time of 23.09 seconds and qualified for the evening final. He placed second in the final, finishing in a time of 22.87 seconds, just 0.03 seconds behind the first-place finisher. On the third day, he placed second in the 100 meter butterfly with a 50.88 and won the 50 meter breaststroke with a new American record and US Open record time of 26.52 seconds. Later in the same session, he placed fifth in the 50 meter backstroke with a time of 24.80 seconds. The following day, he placed second in the 100 meter breaststroke with a time of 58.51 seconds. He placed second in the final of the 50 meter freestyle on the fifth and final day with a personal best time of 21.45 seconds. In total, he was named to the 2022 World Aquatics Championships team roster by USA Swimming in four individual events, the 50 meter and 100 meter breaststroke, the 100 meter butterfly, and the 50 meter freestyle. Three days later, USA Swimming officially added him to the roster in a fifth individual event, the 50 meter butterfly.

=== 2022 World Long Course Championships ===
2022 World Long Course Championships
Gold medal – first place	4×100 m mixed medley relay	3:38.79 (h)
Silver medal – second place	50 m freestyle	21.41
Silver medal – second place	4×100 m medley relay	3:27.79
Bronze medal – third place	50 m butterfly	22.79
Bronze medal – third place	50 m breaststroke	26.72

The first day of swimming competition at the 2022 World Aquatics Championships in Budapest, Hungary in June, Andrew placed ninth in the semifinals of the 100 meter breaststroke with a time of 59.63 seconds. Day two, he won a bronze medal in the 50 meter butterfly with a personal best time of 22.79 seconds, finishing just 0.01 seconds behind silver medalist Nicholas Santos of Brazil and marking his first medal in an individual event at a FINA World Aquatics Championships. Two days later, he swam a 26.72 in the final of the 50 meter breaststroke to win the bronze medal and occupy one of the three podium spots, with Nic Fink of the United States taking the gold medal and Nicolò Martinenghi of Italy taking the silver medal. Later in the same session, he won a gold medal in the 4×100 meter mixed medley relay when the finals relay finished first in 3:38.79, in the prelims heats earlier in the day he contributed a split of 50.69 for the butterfly leg of the relay to help qualify it for the final ranking first.

Three days later, on day seven, Andrew won his first and only medal of the finals session in the 50 meter freestyle, finishing 0.09 seconds behind gold medalist Ben Proud of Great Britain and 0.16 seconds ahead of bronze medalist Maxime Grousset of France with a personal best time of 21.41 seconds to win the silver medal. He followed his silver medal up with a fourth-place finish in the final of the 100 meter butterfly less than 40 minutes later with a time of 51.11 seconds. He concluded competition on the eighth and final day, splitting a 50.06 for the butterfly leg of the 4×100 meter medley relay in the final to help achieve a time of 3:27.79 and win the silver medal behind only the Italy relay team. In July, following his performances, Andrew was named as a member of the roster for the 2022 Duel in the Pool.

=== 2022 World Short Course Championships ===
2022 World Short Course Championships
Gold medal – first place	4×50 m mixed medley relay	1:35.15 (h)
Silver medal – second place	4×50 m medley relay	1:30.37 (AM)

For the 2022 World Short Course Championships, in Melbourne, Australia, Andrew was named to the roster in five individual events, the 50 meter freestyle, 50 meter breaststroke, 100 meter breaststroke, 50 meter butterfly, and 100 meter butterfly. In the 4×50 meter mixed medley relay, he won a gold medal for his efforts in the preliminaries, splitting a 25.56 for the breaststroke leg to help qualify the relay for the final ranking first, when the finals relay placed first with a 1:35.15. He won his second of two medals in the 4×50 meter medley relay, anchoring the relay to a finish in an Americas and American record time of 1:30.37 with a time of 20.39 seconds. In the 4×50 meter mixed freestyle relay, he helped achieve a fourth-place finish in 1:29.18 in the final, swimming the first leg of the relay in 20.81 seconds.

In the 50 meter breaststroke, Andrew achieved a personal best time of 25.81 seconds in the semifinals before going on to place fifth in the final with a time of 25.92 seconds. He placed fifth in the final of the 100 meter individual medley as well, finishing 0.50 seconds behind gold medalist Thomas Ceccon of Italy with a time of 51.47 seconds. In the 50 meter freestyle he ranked eighth in the prelims heats with a 21.02 before withdrawing from further competition in the event, in the 50 meter butterfly he place 14th with a 22.47, in the 100 meter breaststroke he placed 25th with a 58.22, and in the 100 meter butterfly he placed 30th with a time of 51.93 seconds.

== 2023-2026: Later career ==
In 2023, Andrew competed at the Phillips 66 USA National Championship, and won gold in the 50 Fly, but was excluded from the roster of the 2023 World Aquatics Championships because of the priorities of USA Swimming.

At the 2024 Olympic trials, Andrew failed to qualify for the team, finishing 8th in the 100 breaststroke, an event where he holds the American record, and finishing 5th in the 50 freestyle.

Following this disappointing showing at the Olympic trials, Andrew decided to reevaluate his training, and eventually moved to Tempe, Arizona, to train with Arizona State University.

Then, in December, he competed at the 2024 World Aquatics Swimming Championships (25 m), where he earned a silver medal in the 4x100m medley relay.

At the 2025 USA Swimming Championships, Andrew earned his spot for the 2025 World Aquatics Championships by finishing 2nd in the 50 m breaststroke and 50 m butterfly.

At the 2026 USA Swimming Championships, Andrew finished 2nd in the 50 m breaststroke and 3rd in the 50 m butterfly.

== International championships (50 m) ==
Meet	50 free	100 free	50 back	100 back	50 breast	100 breast	50 fly	100 fly	200 medley	4×100 free	4×100 medley	4×100 mixed medley
Junior level
PACJ 2014	1st (b)	22nd	—N/a	2nd place, silver medalist(s)	—N/a	22nd	—N/a	1st (b)	20th	exb^{[b]}	exb^{[b]}	—N/a
WJC 2015	2nd place, silver medalist(s)		1st place, gold medalist(s)	4th	8th	4th	2nd place, silver medalist(s)	9th	7th		2nd place, silver medalist(s)	3rd place, bronze medalist(s)
WJC 2017	1st place, gold medalist(s)		1st place, gold medalist(s)		3rd place, bronze medalist(s)	3rd place, bronze medalist(s)	1st place, gold medalist(s)		8th	4th^{[a]}		
Senior level
PAC 2018	1st place, gold medalist(s)		—N/a	1st (b)	—N/a	7th	—N/a	1st (b)				3rd place, bronze medalist(s)
WC 2019	6th		5th		7th	19th	4th				(silver) ^{[a]}	
OG 2020	4th		—N/a		—N/a	4th	—N/a		5th		1st place, gold medalist(s)	
WC 2022	2nd place, silver medalist(s)				3rd place, bronze medalist(s)	9th	3rd place, bronze medalist(s)	4th			2nd place, silver medalist(s)	(gold) ^{[a]}

^{a} Andrew swam only in the prelims heats.
^{b} Andrew swam only in exhibition.

== International championships (25 m) ==
Meet	50 free	50 breast	100 breast	50 fly	100 fly	100 medley	200 medley	4×50 free	4×50 medley	4×100 medley	4×50 mixed free	4×50 mixed medley
WC 2016		9th				1st place, gold medalist(s)	23rd	(silver) ^{[a]}	(silver) ^{[a]}		11th	
WC 2018	10th	18th	10th	11th		3rd place, bronze medalist(s)		(gold) ^{[a]}	2nd place, silver medalist(s)	(gold) ^{[a]}	(gold) ^{[a]}	1st place, gold medalist(s)
WC 2021	16th	DNS	14th	DNS	33rd	17th						
WC 2022	8th (h, WD)	5th	25th	14th	30th	5th			2nd place, silver medalist(s)		4th	(gold) ^{[a]}

^{a} Andrew swam only in the prelims heats.

== Personal best times ==
=== Long course meters (50 m pool) ===
As of July 7, 2022

Long Course
Event	Time		Meet	Date	Note(s)
50 m freestyle	21.41		2022 World Aquatics Championships	June 24, 2022	
100 m freestyle	49.87		2018 USA Swimming Championships	July 25, 2018	
50 m backstroke	24.39		2019 Sette Colli	June 21, 2019	
100 m backstroke	53.40		2019 Sette Colli	June 22, 2019	
50 m breaststroke	26.52		2022 US International Team Trials	April 28, 2022	US, Former NR
100 m breaststroke	58.14	sf	2020 USA Swimming Olympic Trials	June 13, 2021	AM, NR, US
200 m breaststroke	2:11.32		2021 TYR Pro Swim Series - Mission Viejo	April 10, 2021	
50 m butterfly	22.79		2022 World Aquatics Championships	June 19, 2022	
100 m butterfly	50.80		2021 TYR Pro Swim Series - Indianapolis	May 14, 2021	PSS
200 m individual medley	1:55.26	sf	2020 USA Swimming Olympic Trials	June 17, 2021	
400 m individual medley	4:26.24		2017 Arena Pro Swim Series	January 14, 2017	

Legend: AM – Americas record; e – equalled existing record; NR – American record; US – US Open record; PSS – Pro Swim Series record;
Records not set in finals: h – heat; sf – semifinal; r – relay 1st leg; rh – relay heat 1st leg; b – B final; † – en route to final mark; so – swim-off; tt – time trial

=== Short course meters (25 m pool) ===
Event	Time	Meet	Date	Notes
50 m freestyle	20.94	FINA World Cup 2018	November 15, 2018	
100 m freestyle	48.89	FINA World Cup 2016	August 26, 2016	
50 m backstroke	23.11	FINA World Cup 2018	November 16, 2018	
100 m backstroke	50.36	FINA World Cup 2018	October 6, 2018	
50 m breaststroke	25.81	2022 World Swimming Championships	December 17, 2022	sf
100 m breaststroke	57.24	2018 World Swimming Championships	December 11, 2018	
200 m breaststroke	2:12.19	FINA World Cup 2022	November 5, 2022	
50 m butterfly	22.32	FINA World Cup 2018	November 17, 2018	
100 m butterfly	50.61	2020 International Swimming League	November 14, 2020	
100 m individual medley	51.16	FINA World Cup 2018	November 15, 2018	
200 m individual medley	1:56.37	2015 Ontario Junior International	December 6, 2015	
400 m individual medley	4:13.39	FINA World Cup 2017	November 10, 2017	

Legend: sf = semifinal

== Swimming World Cup circuits ==
The following medals Andrew has won at Swimming World Cup circuits.

Edition	Gold medals	Silver medals	Bronze medals	Total
2015	0	0	2	2
2016	0	6	1	7
2017	0	3	2	5
2018	4	25	4	33
2019	7	13	9	29
2022	0	1	1	2
Total	11	48	19	78

== World records ==
=== World junior records ===
==== Long course meters ====
No.	Event	Time		Meet	Date	Location	Status	Age	Ref
1	100 m breaststroke	59.96	h	2016 US Olympic Trials	June 26, 2016	Omaha, Nebraska	Former	17	
2	100 m breaststroke (2)	59.82		2016 US Olympic Trials	June 27, 2016	Omaha, Nebraska	Former	17	
3	200 m individual medley	1:59.44	sf, =	2016 US Olympic Trials	June 30, 2016	Omaha, Nebraska	Former	17	
4	200 m individual medley (2)	1:59.12		2017 Arena Pro Swim Series	March 4, 2017	Indianapolis, United States	Former	17	
5	50 m backstroke	24.63	h	2017 World Junior Championships	August 25, 2017	Indianapolis, United States	Former	18	
6	50 m freestyle	21.75	h	2017 World Junior Championships	August 25, 2017	Indianapolis, United States	Current	18	
7	50 m backstroke (2)	24.63	=	2017 World Junior Championships	August 26, 2017	Indianapolis, United States	Former	18	
8	50 m butterfly	23.27	sf	2017 World Junior Championships	August 26, 2017	Indianapolis, United States	Former	18	
9	50 m freestyle (2)	21.75	=	2017 World Junior Championships	August 26, 2017	Indianapolis, United States	Current	18	
10	50 m butterfly (2)	23.22		2017 World Junior Championships	August 27, 2017	Indianapolis, United States	Former	18	

Legend: h – heats; sf – semifinal; = – tied pre-existing record

==== Short course meters ====
No.	Event	Time	Meet	Date	Location	Status	Age	Ref
1	100 m individual medley	51.86	2017 Swimming World Cup	November 11, 2017	Beijing, China	Former	18	
2	100 m individual medley (2)	51.65	2017 Swimming World Cup	November 18, 2017	Singapore	Former	18	
3	4×50 m mixed medley relay	1:41.91	2017 Swimming World Cup	November 18, 2017	Singapore	Former	18	

=== World records ===
==== Long course meters ====
No.	Event	Time	Meet	Date	Location	Status	Age	Ref
1	4×100 m medley relay^{[a]} (breaststroke)	3:26.78 (58.49)	2020 Summer Olympics	August 1, 2021	Tokyo, Japan	Current	22	

^{a} with Ryan Murphy (backstroke), Caeleb Dressel (butterfly), Zach Apple (freestyle)

==== Short course meters ====
No.	Event	Time	Meet	Date	Location	Status	Age	Ref
1	4×50 m mixed medley relay^{[a]} (breaststroke)	1:36.40 (25.75)	2018 World Swimming Championships	December 13, 2018	Hangzhou, China	Former	19	

^{a} with Olivia Smoliga (backstroke), Kelsi Dahlia (butterfly), Caeleb Dressel (freestyle)

== Continental and national records ==
=== Long course meters ===
No.	Event	Time		Meet	Date	Location	Type	Status	Age	Notes	Ref
1	50 m breaststroke	26.86	h, =	2018 US National Championships	July 27, 2018	Irvine, California	US	Former	19		
2	50 m breaststroke (2)	26.84		2018 US National Championships	July 27, 2018	Irvine, California	US	Former	19		
3	100 m breaststroke	58.67		2021 TYR Pro Swim Series	May 13, 2021	Indianapolis, Indiana	US	Former	22		
4	100 m breaststroke (2)	58.19	h	2020 US Olympic Trials	June 13, 2021	Omaha, Nebraska	AM, NR, US	Former	22		
5	50 m breaststroke (3)	26.83	sf, †	2020 US Olympic Trials	June 13, 2021	Omaha, Nebraska	US	Former	22		
6	100 m breaststroke (3)	58.14	sf	2020 US Olympic Trials	June 13, 2021	Omaha, Nebraska	AM, NR, US	Current	22		
7	4×100 m medley relay	3:26.78		2020 Summer Olympics	August 1, 2021	Tokyo, Japan	AM, NR	Current	22	WR, OR	
8	50 m breaststroke (4)	26.52		2022 US International Team Trials	April 28, 2022	Greensboro, North Carolina	NR, US	Current US	23		

Legend: WR – World record; AM – Americas record; e – equalled existing record; NR – American record; US – US Open record; OR – Olympic record;
Records not set in finals: h – heat; sf – semifinal; r – relay 1st leg; rh – relay heat 1st leg; b – B final; † – en route to final mark; so – swim-off; tt – time trial

=== Short course meters ===
No.	Event	Time		Meet	Date	Location	Type	Status	Age	Notes	Ref
1	50 m breaststroke	26.15	=	2018 Swimming World Cup	November 3, 2018	Beijing, China	NR	Former	19		
2	50 m breaststroke (2)	26.10		2018 Swimming World Cup	November 16, 2018	Singapore	NR	Former	19		
3	50 m butterfly	22.37	h	2018 Swimming World Cup	November 17, 2018	Singapore	NR	Former	19		
4	50 m butterfly (2)	22.32		2018 Swimming World Cup	November 17, 2018	Singapore	NR	Former	19		
5	4×50 m mixed medley relay	1:36.40		2018 World Championships	December 13, 2018	Hangzhou, China	AM, NR	Former	19	Former WR	
6	4×50 m medley relay	1:30.90		2018 World Championships	December 15, 2018	Hangzhou, China	NR	Former	19		
7	4×50 m medley relay (2)	1:30.37		2022 World Championships	December 17, 2022	Melbourne, Australia	AM, NR	Current	23		

Legend: WR – World record; AM – Americas record; e – equalled existing record; NR – American record;
Records not set in finals: h – heat; sf – semifinal; r – relay 1st leg; rh – relay heat 1st leg; b – B final; † – en route to final mark; so – swim-off; tt – time trial

== Physique ==
=== Ultra Short Race Pace Training ===
Michael Andrew has adopted a unique training style called Ultra Short Race Pace Training(USRPT). In an interview with NBC Olympics Andrew spoke about his training:

We train as specific as possible. Our sessions are shorter but intentional every time, using USRPT (ultra-short race pace training). I use blood flow restriction to train and recover. We use power plates to train fast twitch fibers.

USRPT, short for Ultra-Short Race-Pace Training, is an evidence-based training program/stroke curriculum developed by Dr. Bent S. Rushall for the sport of swimming that Andrew started using as his training method when he was 10 years old.

In the Open Access Journal of Sports Medicine, Nugent et al., 2019 reviewed the science behind the USRPT methodology finding most of the science to be anecdotal in nature, highlighting the training records of Andrew as one form of more concrete scientific evidence, and emphasizing the importance of statistical evidence in proving the effectiveness of the USRPT methodology.

=== Diet ===
Andrew follows a ketogenic diet as part of his training.

== Highlights ==
- 2009: Commenced training with Ultra Short Race Pace Training, 10 years old
- 2013: Became a professional swimmer at 14 years of age
- 2015: First junior world title: 50 meter backstroke, 16 years old
- 2016: First world title (long course or short course): 100 meter individual medley (short course), 17 years old
- 2016—2017: Multiple-time world junior record holder in events spanning breaststroke, individual medley, backstroke, freestyle, and butterfly, 17–18 years old
- 2017: First swimmer to achieve three world junior records in a time span of less than one hour (in one finals session) at a FINA World Junior Swimming Championships, 18 years old
- 2018: Four national titles in breaststroke, freestyle, and butterfly events, 19 years old
- 2018: First long course international title: 50 meter freestyle at the 2018 Pan Pacific Championships, 19 years old
- 2018: First world record (short or long course): mixed 4x50 meter medley relay (breaststroke leg), 19 years old
- 2019: First male swimmer to final in backstroke, breaststroke, butterfly, and freestyle events at the 50 meter distance at a single FINA World Championships, 20 years old
- 2021: Multiple time national record holder in the long course 100 meter breaststroke, 22 years old
- 2021: Competed in four individual and relay events at his first Olympic Games: 1st in the 4x100 meter medley relay, 4th in the 100 meter breaststroke, 4th in the 50 meter freestyle, 5th in the 200 meter individual medley, 22 years old
- 2021: First Olympic medal: gold medal in the 4x100 meter medley relay in Olympic record and world record time at the 2020 Summer Olympics, 22 years old
- 2021: First long course world record: 4x100 meter medley relay (breaststroke leg), 22 years old
- 2021: Became the first American in the 125-year-history, at the time of competition in 2021, of swimming at the modern Olympic Games to compete in an individual breaststroke event (100 meter breaststroke) in addition to an individual event other than breaststroke that was not an individual medley (50 meter freestyle), 22 years old
- 2021—2022: Only male swimmer for the United States to make the 2021—2022 US National Team in four or more individual events, 22 years old
- 2022: First medal in an individual event at a FINA World Aquatics Championships: 50 metre butterfly (bronze medal), 23 years old

== Awards and honors ==
- Golden Goggle Award, Relay Performance of the Year: 2021 (4x100 meter medley relay)
- Golden Goggle Award, Breakout Performer of the Year: 2018
- Swimming World, The Week That Was: November 1, 2021 (#2)
- SwimSwam, Top 100 (Men's): 2021 (#77), 2022 (#17)
- SwimSwam, Ultra Swim Swimmer of the Month: July 2018, September 2018, May 2021
- SwimSwam, Swammy Award, Age Group Swimmer of the Year 13–14 (male): 2013, 2014
- Golden Goggle Award nominee, Male Race of the Year: 2018 (50 meter freestyle)

== Personal life ==
Andrew has a girlfriend named Destiny, they started dating on February 1, 2020.

Andrew is a Christian. He has said, "Faith is everything. I know that God gives life and without God and what he has done for my family and I, there would be no point in swimming or being here."

== Controversy ==
In the weeks leading up to the 2020 Summer Olympics, Andrew made headlines for defending his decision to go to Tokyo without being vaccinated against COVID-19, which he had tested positive for a few months prior. His decision drew attention from national newspaper USA Today who stated Andrew was the biggest name to come out openly about not getting a COVID-19 vaccine in advance of the 2020 Summer Olympics. Athletes were not required to get a COVID-19 vaccine to compete at the 2020 Olympics and estimates put 80 to 90% of athletes on the U.S. team as having received the vaccine, which made Andrew part of the minority that did not get vaccinated. Speaking to Reuters via a media conference call, Andrew clarified, "My reason behind it is -- for one, it was in the last moment I didn't want to put anything in my body that I didn't know how I would potentially react to. As an athlete on the elite level, everything we do is very calculated. For me in the training cycles and especially at trials, I didn't want to risk any days out, because there are periods where if you take a vaccine, you have to deal with some days off."

== See also ==
- World and Olympic records set at the 2020 Summer Olympics
- World record progression 4 × 100 metres medley relay
- List of junior world records in swimming
- List of Americas records in swimming
- List of World Swimming Championships (25 m) medalists (men)
- List of people from South Dakota
- List of Liberty University people

Records
Preceded by Aaron Peirsol, Eric Shanteau, Michael Phelps, David Walters	Men's 4×100-meter medley relay world record-holder (long course); August 1, 2021 – present With: Ryan Murphy, Caeleb Dressel, Zach Apple	Succeeded by Incumbents
