= Peter Andrew =

South African swimming coach

Peter Andrew is a South African swimming coach from Lawrence, Kansas. He is the head coach of the Race Pace Club, and was selected to be an assistant Olympic swimming coach at the 2020 Olympic Games. He is head coach of the ISL team the New York Breakers, and father of Michael Andrew.

== Career ==
Andrew established the Aberdeen Aquaholics, a swim club in South Dakota. The team moved to Kansas, becoming Indie Swimming and then the Race Pace Club. Prior to coaching, Andrew was a member of the Naval Operational Dive Team with the South African Naval Defense Force.
