= Blake Pieroni =

American swimmer (born 1995)

Personal information
- Full name: Blake John Pieroni
- Nickname: BJ
- National team: United States
- Born: November 15, 1995 (age 30) Crown Point, Indiana, U.S.
- Height: 6 ft 2 in (188 cm)
- Weight: 190 lb (86 kg)

Sport
- Sport: Swimming
- Strokes: Freestyle
- Club: LA Current (ISL 2019); Toronto Titans (ISL 2020)
- College team: Indiana University
Medal record
Men's swimming
Representing the United States
Event	1st	2nd	3rd
Olympic Games	3	1	0
World Championships (LC)	4	0	2
World Championships (SC)	4	1	1
Pan Pacific Championships	1	0	0
World Junior Championships	0	0	1
Total	12	2	4
Olympic Games
Gold medal – first place	2016 Rio de Janeiro	4×100 m freestyle
Gold medal – first place	2020 Tokyo	4×100 m freestyle
Gold medal – first place	2020 Tokyo	4×100 m medley
Silver medal – second place	2024 Paris	4x200 m freestyle
World Championships (LC)
Gold medal – first place	2017 Budapest	4×100 m freestyle
Gold medal – first place	2017 Budapest	4×100 m mixed freestyle
Gold medal – first place	2019 Gwangju	4×100 m freestyle
Gold medal – first place	2019 Gwangju	4×100 m mixed freestyle
Bronze medal – third place	2017 Budapest	4×200 m freestyle
Bronze medal – third place	2019 Gwangju	4×200 m freestyle
World Championships (SC)
Gold medal – first place	2016 Windsor	4×200 m freestyle
Gold medal – first place	2018 Hangzhou	200 m freestyle
Gold medal – first place	2018 Hangzhou	4×100 m freestyle
Gold medal – first place	2018 Hangzhou	4×100 m medley
Silver medal – second place	2016 Windsor	4×50 m freestyle
Bronze medal – third place	2016 Windsor	4×100 m freestyle
Pan Pacific Championships
Gold medal – first place	2018 Tokyo	4×200 m freestyle
World Junior Championships
Bronze medal – third place	2013 Dubai	4×200 m freestyle
Junior Pan Pac Championships
Gold medal – first place	2014 Maui	4×100 m freestyle
Gold medal – first place	2014 Maui	4×200 m freestyle
Silver medal – second place	2014 Maui	100 m freestyle
Silver medal – second place	2014 Maui	200 m freestyle

Blake John Pieroni (/pəˈroʊni/ pə-ROH-nee; born November 15, 1995) is a three-time Olympic gold medalist in swimming. He is a two time Olympian and gold medalist in the 4×100-meter freestyle relay at both the 2016 Summer Olympics and the 2020 Summer Olympics. On the relay in 2016, he swam in the prelims of the race, on the 2020 Olympics 4×100-meter freestyle relay he swam in both the prelims and the final. He also won a gold medal in the 4x100-meter medley relay at the 2020 Olympic Games, swimming the freestyle leg of the relay in the prelims.

== Background ==
Pieroni was born in Crown Point, Indiana, and raised in Chesterton where he graduated from Chesterton High School in 2014. He graduated from Indiana University. Pieroni continues to swim at Indiana University as a member of the Pro Swim group along with fellow professional swimmers, Cody Miller, Lilly King, and Annie Lazor.

== Career ==
=== 2013 World Junior Championships ===
In 2013, at the World Junior Championships in Dubai, Pieroni took the bronze in the 4 × 200 m freestyle with the men's relay team.

=== 2014 Junior Pan Pacific Championships ===
As an 18-year-old at the 2014 Junior Pan Pacific Swimming Championships in Maui, Hawaii, Pieroni won gold medals in the 4×100 meter freestyle relay (3:18.68) and 4×200 meter freestyle relay (7:21.36), as well as silver medals in the 100 meter freestyle (50.30) and 200 meter freestyle (1:48.85).

=== 2016 Summer Olympics ===
2016 Summer Olympics
Gold medal – first place	4×100 m freestyle	3:09.92

At the US Olympic Trials, he qualified for the 2016 Summer Olympics in Rio de Janeiro as a 4×100 meter freestyle relay swimmer. In the heats, he swam a split time of 48.39 on the third leg, and the team went on to win the gold medal.

=== 2016 and 2017 World Championships ===
At the 2016 World Championships in Windsor, Ontario, with the men's relay team, Pieroni won two silver and one bronze medals: silver in 4 x 50 m freestyle; silver in 4 × 200 m freestyle and bronze in 4 × 100 m freestyle.

Pieroni won two gold medals and a bronze medal at the 2017 World Championships in Budapest as part of the men's and mixed freestyle teams: gold in 4 × 100 m freestyle, gold in 4 × 100 m mixed freestyle and bronze in 4 × 200 m freestyle.

=== 2018 NCAA Championships ===
In March 2018 at the NCAA championships he set the American and US Open records in the 200-yard freestyle with a time of 1:29.63, becoming the first swimmer to break 1:30. Two days later his record was broken by Townley Haas.

=== 2018 Pan Pacific and World Championships ===
At the Tokyo Pan Pacific Championships in August 2018, Pieroni won gold with the men's relay team in the 4 × 200 m freestyle event. He also won the B-final of the 50-meter freestyle with a time of 22.22 seconds and ranked ninth across both finals heats.

At the 2018 World Championships in Hangzhou, China, which took place in a short course (25m) pool in December, Pieroni returned home with three gold medals, having won the 200 m freestyle as well as 4 × 100 m freestyle and medley events, as part of the men's relay team.

=== 2019 World Championships ===
At the 2019 World Championships in Gwangju, South Korea, Pieroni took home two gold medals as part of the 4 × 100 m and 4 x 100 mixed freestyle teams. He also won a bronze medal as part of the 4 × 200 m freestyle team.

=== 2019—2020 International Swimming League ===
In fall of 2019, Pieroni signed for the team LA Current in the inaugural International Swimming League season. In the spring of 2020, he signed to compete in the 2020 International Swimming League for the team Toronto Titans, which was the first team in the International Swimming League based in Canada.

=== 2020 Olympic Trials ===
Pieroni placed third in the 100m freestyle at the US Olympic Swimming Trials with a time of 48.16, qualifying him for the US Olympic Swimming team in the 4 × 100 m freestyle relay. Earlier in the meet, in the 200-meter freestyle, Pieroni ranked seventh overall with a time of 1:46.57 and qualified for his first event at the 2020 Summer Olympics, the 4x200-meter freestyle relay.

=== 2020 Summer Olympics ===
2020 Summer Olympics
Gold medal – first place	4×100 m freestyle	3:08.97
Gold medal – first place	4×100 m medley relay	3:26.78

At the 2020 Summer Olympics held in Tokyo, Japan, Pieroni competed in the prelims and final of the 4x100-meter freestyle relay. In the final of the event, he won a gold medal swimming the second leg of the relay. He and all of his prelims and finals relay teammates, Brooks Curry, Bowe Becker, Caeleb Dressel, and Zach Apple, won gold for their efforts. It was the first medal Pieroni won swimming in the final of any event at the Olympic Games. His performance was good enough in the eyes of the USA Swimming Foundation to include him in their nomination of the 4x100-meter freestyle relay for the 2021 Golden Goggle Award for "Relay Performance of the Year" solely because he swam on the finals relay, something he learned after he was excluded from the nomination of, and award itself to, the 2016 United States 4x100-meter freestyle relay for the 2016 Golden Goggle Award for "Relay Performance of the Year" when he only swam on the prelims relay and not in the final.

On day four of competition, in Pieroni's second event at the 2020 Olympics, he advanced the 4x200-meter freestyle relay to the final in the prelims heats with his fellow prelims-relay swimmers Drew Kibler, Patrick Callan, and Andrew Seliskar. The finals relay did not medal, finishing fourth overall.

In the prelims heats of the 4x100-meter medley relay on day seven, Pieroni swam the freestyle leg of the relay, helping the relay consisting of him, Hunter Armstrong, Andrew Wilson, and Tom Shields, finish seventh overall and advance to the final. On the last day of competition, the finals relay placed first and all the members of the prelims relay and the finals relay won a gold medal for their efforts.

=== 2021 International Swimming League ===
The Toronto Titans selected Pieroni for their roster in the 2021 International Swimming League. After injuring his knee during training leading up to the playoffs season and following the regular season of competition, Pieroni withdrew from competing in the playoffs for the year.

=== 2021 Swimming World Cup ===
==== Stop 1: Berlin ====
2021 World Cup — Berlin
Bronze medal – third place	100 m individual medley	53.53
Bronze medal – third place	100 m freestyle	46.74

As part of the pre-World Cup FINA highlights, Pieroni had a picture of him celebrating a win at the 2020 Summer Olympics published on the FINA website as part of their star athletes to appear in the World Cup collection of photographs. Stop number one of the short course 2021 FINA Swimming World Cup, in Berlin, Germany, Pieroni started competition on day one in the prelims of the 50-meter freestyle with a swim of 21.75 that ranked him fifth overall and advanced him to the final. Within the hour, Pieroni followed up his performance in the 50-meter freestyle with a 53.73 in the 100-meter individual medley and advanced to the final ranked second overall. In the evening finals, Pieroni opted not to swim the 50-meter freestyle, focusing his efforts fully on the 100-meter individual medley where he swam a personal best time of 53.53 seconds and won the bronze medal in the event. The following day, October 2, Pieroni advanced to the final of the 100-meter freestyle with his time of 47.25 in the morning prelims session. In the final in the evening, he won the bronze medal, touching the wall third with a time of 46.74 behind Kyle Chalmers of Australia who won the gold medal and Jesse Puts of the Netherlands who won the silver medal. The third and final day of competition in Berlin, Pieroni placed fourth in the final of the 200 meter freestyle with a time of 1:42.87 after qualifying for the final ranking fifth with his time of 1:44.29 from the prelims.

==== Stop 2: Budapest ====
For the second World Cup stop, held in Budapest, Hungary, Pieroni was noted by FINA and Swimming World as one of the athletes from the United States to watch at the international competition. On October 7, the first day of competition, he advanced to the final of the 100-meter individual medley ranked fifth overall and did not qualify for the final of the 50-meter freestyle, ranking tenth in the prelims heats. In the 100-meter individual medley final later the same day, he just missed the podium, placing fourth with a time of 53.82 seconds. Morning of day two, Pieroni ranked fourth overall in the 100-meter freestyle with a time of 47.44 seconds and qualified for the final later in the day. In the final, he placed fifth with a time of 47.09 seconds in a talent-packed field, finishing after Kyle Chalmers, Vladimir Morozov of Russia, Kristóf Milák of Hungary, and Jesse Puts. For his last race in Budapest, Pieroni swam a 1:49.59 and ranked 23rd in the 200-meter freestyle, not advancing to the final in the evening.

==== Stop 3: Doha ====
Entering the days ahead of the third World Cup stop, in Doha, Qatar, Swimming World listed Pieroni as a United States roster standout from the list of athletes entered to compete at the stop. He switched out the 50-meter freestyle and substituted in the 100-meter butterfly for his event entries line-up compared to the previous two World Cup stops, giving him the butterfly race, the 100-meter freestyle, 100-meter individual medley, and 200-meter freestyle races in Doha.

Pieroni commenced competing in a duo of events on day one of competition with the prelims heats of the 100-meter butterfly in the morning where he ranked seventh with a time of 52.76 seconds and qualified for the final. Finishing off his morning duo of events about 30 minutes later, Pieroni ranked eighth in the prelims of the 100-meter individual medley with a time of 54.61 seconds and advanced to the final. In his first race of the evening, the final of the 100-meter butterfly, he placed sixth with a time of 52.34 seconds. While Pieroni qualified for the final in the 100-meter individual medley, he decided to go with not racing in the final. Rejuvenated for the prelims of the 100-meter freestyle the following morning, Pieroni swam a 48.15 and advanced to the final ranked fifth overall. He lowered his time to a 47.59 in the final, placing fifth overall. For his last event of competition in Doha, Pieroni did not start the race in the 200-meter freestyle, deciding not to swim the race. Pieroni's scores from the first three stops were high enough for him to rank sixteenth out of all male competitors, and second out of male American competitors, for overall score across all four stops of the 2021 World Cup circuit.

=== 2022: Retirement ===
On August 26, 2022, swimming-centric news outlets Swimming World and SwimSwam announced Pieroni had retired from swimming and would not be returning to competition in the sport.

== International championships (50 m) ==
Meet	50 freestyle	100 freestyle	200 freestyle	100 butterfly	4×100 freestyle	4×200 freestyle	4×100 medley	4×100 mixed freestyle
Junior level
WJC 2013			16th			3rd place, bronze medalist(s)		
PACJ 2014	20th	2nd place, silver medalist(s)	2nd place, silver medalist(s)	19th	1st place, gold medalist(s)	1st place, gold medalist(s)		—N/a
Senior level
OG 2016					(gold) ^{[a]}			—N/a
WC 2017			13th		1st place, gold medalist(s)	3rd place, bronze medalist(s)		(gold) ^{[a]}
PAC 2018	1st (b)	1st (b)	1st (b)		DSQ	1st place, gold medalist(s)		—N/a
WC 2019		4th			1st place, gold medalist(s)	3rd place, bronze medalist(s)		(gold) ^{[a]}
OG 2020					1st place, gold medalist(s)	4th^{[a]}	(gold) ^{[a]}	—N/a

^{a} Pieroni swam only in the prelims heats.

== International championships (25 m) ==
Meet	100 freestyle	200 freestyle	4×50 freestyle	4×100 freestyle	4×200 freestyle	4×100 medley
WC 2016	4th		2nd place, silver medalist(s)	3rd place, bronze medalist(s)	1st place, gold medalist(s)	DSQ
WC 2018	7th	1st place, gold medalist(s)		1st place, gold medalist(s)	4th	(gold) ^{[a]}

^{a} Pieroni swam only in the prelims heats.

== Career best times ==
=== Long course meters (50 m pool) ===
Event	Time	Meet	Location	Date	Age
50 m freestyle	22.03	2019 FINA Swimming World Cup	Tokyo, Japan	August 2, 2019	23
100 m freestyle	47.87	2019 World Aquatics Championships	Gwangju, South Korea	July 24, 2019	23
200 m freestyle	1:45.93	2018 USA Swimming Championships	Irvine, California	July 26, 2018	22
400 m freestyle	3:53.98	2018 FINA Swimming World Cup	Doha, Qatar	September 13, 2018	22

=== Short course meters (25 m pool) ===
Event	Time	Meet	Location	Date	Age
50 m freestyle	21.34	2018 FINA Swimming World Cup	Eindhoven, Netherlands	September 28, 2018	22
100 m freestyle	46.15	2020 International Swimming League	Budapest, Hungary	October 25, 2020	24
200 m freestyle	1:41.15	2018 FINA Swimming World Cup	Singapore	November 17, 2018	23
400 m freestyle	3:41.79	2018 FINA Swimming World Cup	Eindhoven, Netherlands	September 28, 2018	22
100 m breaststroke	1:00.46	2018 FINA Swimming World Cup	Singapore	November 15, 2018	23
100 m butterfly	52.04	2018 FINA Swimming World Cup	Singapore	November 15, 2018	23
100 m individual medley	53.53	2021 FINA Swimming World Cup	Berlin, Germany	October 1, 2021	25

== Swimming World Cup circuits ==
The following medals Pieroni has won at Swimming World Cup circuits.

Edition	Gold medals	Silver medals	Bronze medals	Total
2018	8	10	7	25
2019	0	2	2	4
2021	0	0	2	2
Total	8	12	11	31

== World records ==
=== Short course meters ===
No.	Event	Time	Meet	Location	Date	Status	Age	Ref
1	4x100 m freestyle relay^{[a]}	3:03.03	2018 World Swimming Championships	Hangzhou, China	11 December 2018	Current	23	

^{a} split 45.75 (2nd leg); with Caeleb Dressel (1st leg), Michael Chadwick (3rd leg), Ryan Held (4th leg)

== Awards and honors ==
- SwimSwam Top 100 (Men's): 2021 (#78), 2022 (#75)
- Golden Goggle Award nominee, Relay Performance of the Year: 2021 (4x100 meter freestyle relay)

== Personal ==
=== Sponsorships ===
As part of being a professional swimmer, Pieroni took the path less traveled and signed with Japanese sporting goods company Mizuno Corporation in 2018, making history by becoming the first American swimmer in history to do so.
