= 2018 Pan Pacific Swimming Championships – Men's 50 metre freestyle =

2018 Swimming Competition

Men's 50 metre freestyle at the 2018 Pan Pacific Swimming Championships
- Venue: Tokyo Tatsumi International Swimming Center
- Dates: 12 August (heats & finals)
- Competitors: 37 from 13 nations
- Winning time: 21.46

Medalists
gold medal	Michael Andrew	United States
silver medal	Caeleb Dressel	United States
bronze medal	Yuri Kisil	Canada

The men's 50 metre freestyle competition at the 2018 Pan Pacific Swimming Championships took place on August 12 at the Tokyo Tatsumi International Swimming Center. The defending champion was Bruno Fratus of Brazil.

== Records ==
Prior to this competition, the existing world and Pan Pacific records were as follows:

World record	César Cielo (BRA)	20.91	São Paulo, Brazil	18 December 2009
Pan Pacific Championships record	Bruno Fratus (BRA)	21.44	Gold Coast, Australia	24 August 2014

== Results ==
All times are in minutes and seconds.

KEY:	QA	Qualified A Final	QB	Qualified B Final	CR	Championships record	NR	National record	PB	Personal best	SB	Seasonal best

=== Heats ===
The first round was held on 12 August from 10:00.

Only two swimmers from each country may advance to the A or B final. If a country not qualify any swimmer to the A final, that same country may qualify up to three swimmers to the B final.

Rank	Name	Nationality	Time	Notes
1	Michael Andrew	United States	21.83	QA
2	Caeleb Dressel	United States	22.17	QA
3	Katsumi Nakamura	Japan	22.21	QA
4	Yuri Kisil	Canada	22.28	QA
5	Shinri Shioura	Japan	22.30	QA
6	Pedro Spajari	Brazil	22.32	QA
7	Marcelo Chierighini	Brazil	22.34	QA
8	Gabriel Santos	Brazil	22.49	QB
9	Daniel Hunter	New Zealand	22.51	QA
9	Zachary Apple	United States	22.51	QB
11	Blake Pieroni	United States	22.53	QB
12	Shunichi Nakao	Japan	22.54	QB
13	James Roberts	Australia	22.56	QB
14	Will Pisani	Canada	22.58	QB
15	Jack Cartwright	Australia	22.60	QB
16	Owen Daly	Canada	22.73	QB
17	Katsuhiro Matsumoto	Japan	22.97	
17	Ruslan Gaziev	Canada	22.97	
19	Alexander Graham	Australia	23.06	
20	David Morgan	Australia	23.07	
21	Reo Sakata	Japan	23.14	
22	Marco Ferreira Júnior	Brazil	23.16	
23	Elijah Winnington	Australia	23.28	
24	Liu Shaofeng	China	23.35	
25	Jarod Hatch	Philippines	23.97	
26	Nao Horomura	Japan	24.16	
27	Rafael Barreto	Philippines	24.52	
28	Samir Al-Adawi	Oman	24.58	
29	Timothy Yen	Philippines	25.01	
30	Armand Chan	Philippines	25.35	
31	Noel Keane	Palau	25.46	
32	Lennosuke Suzuki	Northern Mariana Islands	26.58	
33	Mark Imazu	Guam	27.99	
34	Nelson Batallones	Northern Mariana Islands	29.74	
–	Grant Irvine	Australia	DNS	
–	Federico Grabich	Argentina	DNS	
–	Nathan Adrian	United States	DNS	

=== B Final ===
The B final was held on 12 August from 17:30.

Rank	Name	Nationality	Time	Notes
9	Blake Pieroni	United States	22.22	
10	Zachary Apple	United States	22.30	
11	Shunichi Nakao	Japan	22.36	
12	Gabriel Santos	Brazil	22.39	
13	James Roberts	Australia	22.47	
14	Jack Cartwright	Australia	22.65	
15	Will Pisani	Canada	22.66	
16	Owen Daly	Canada	22.84	

=== A Final ===
The A final was held on 12 August from 17:30.

Rank	Name	Nationality	Time	Notes
1st place, gold medalist(s)	Michael Andrew	United States	21.46	
2nd place, silver medalist(s)	Caeleb Dressel	United States	21.93	
3rd place, bronze medalist(s)	Yuri Kisil	Canada	22.02	
4	Katsumi Nakamura	Japan	22.24	
5	Shinri Shioura	Japan	22.27	
6	Pedro Spajari	Brazil	22.30	
7	Daniel Hunter	New Zealand	22.39	
8	Marcelo Chierighini	Brazil	22.50	
