= Aleksandr Popkov =

Russian swimmer

Personal information
- Nationality: Russian
- Born: 27 December 1994 (age 31)
- Height: 1.85 m (6 ft 1 in)
- Weight: 80 kg (176 lb)

Sport
- Country: Russia
- Sport: Swimming
Medal record
World Championships (LC)
Bronze medal – third place	2017 Budapest	4×100 m medley
World Championships (SC)
Gold medal – first place	2014 Doha	4×50 m freestyle
Gold medal – first place	2016 Windsor	4x50 m freestyle
Gold medal – first place	2016 Windsor	4x100 m freestyle
Gold medal – first place	2016 Windsor	4x50 m medley
Gold medal – first place	2016 Windsor	4x100 m medley
European Championships (SC)
Gold medal – first place	2017 Copenhagen	50 m butterfly
Gold medal – first place	2017 Copenhagen	4×50 m freestyle
Gold medal – first place	2017 Copenhagen	4×50 m medley
Gold medal – first place	2019 Glasgow	4×50 m freestyle
Gold medal – first place	2019 Glasgow	4×50 m medley
Silver medal – second place	2015 Netanya	4×50 m medley
Bronze medal – third place	2015 Netanya	50 m butterfly

Aleksandr Yevgenyevich Popkov (Russian: Александр Евгеньевич Попков; born 27 December 1994) is a Russian swimmer. He represented his country at the 2016 Summer Olympics.
