= Pavel Sankovich =

Belarusian swimmer (born 1990)

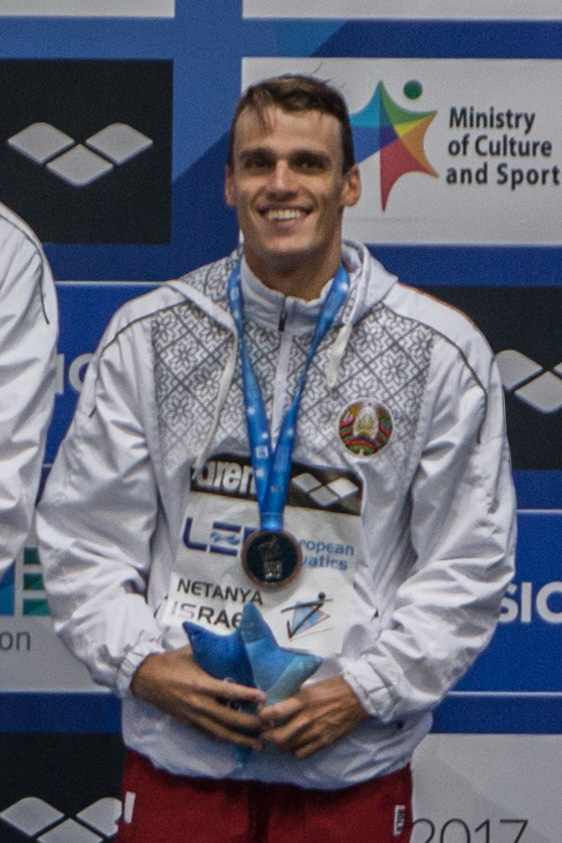
- Sankovich with bronze medal won at the 4×50m mixed medley relay, 2015 European Short Course Championships, Netanya

Personal information
- Full name: Pavel Paulavich Sankovich
- National team: Belarus
- Born: June 29, 1990 (age 36) Grodno, Belarusian SSR, Soviet Union
- Height: 1.82 m (6 ft 0 in)
- Weight: 78 kg (172 lb)

Sport
- Sport: Swimming
- Strokes: Backstroke, butterfly
- Club: SK VS Minsk
- College team: Florida State University (U.S.)
- Coach: Henadziy Vishniakou; Frank Bradley (U.S.)
Medal record
Men's swimming
Representing Belarus
World Championships (SC)
Bronze medal – third place	2016 Windsor	50 m backstroke
Bronze medal – third place	2016 Windsor	4x50 m medley
European Championships (LC)
Bronze medal – third place	2014 Berlin	100 m butterfly
European Championships (SC)
Silver medal – second place	2017 Copenhagen	4×50 m mixed medley
Bronze medal – third place	2011 Szczecin	50 m backstroke
Bronze medal – third place	2011 Szczecin	100 m backstroke
Bronze medal – third place	2013 Herning	50 m backstroke
Bronze medal – third place	2015 Netanya	4×50 m freestyle
Bronze medal – third place	2015 Netanya	4×50 m medley
Bronze medal – third place	2015 Netanya	4×50 m mixed medley
Bronze medal – third place	2017 Copenhagen	4×50 m medley

Pavel Paulavich Sankovich (Belarusian: Павел Паўлавіч Санковіч; born 29 June 1990) is a Belarusian swimmer, who specialized in sprint backstroke and butterfly events. He represented his native Belarus in three editions of the Olympic Games (2008, 2012 and 2016), and has won a total of seven bronze medals in major international competition, in both the long and short course European Championships.

== Career ==
=== Early years ===
Sankovich made his first Belarusian team, as an 18-year-old, at the 2008 Summer Olympics in Beijing, competing in both the 100 m backstroke and the medley relay. Leading up to the Games, he broke a Belarusian record and cleared a FINA B-cut of 56.10 at the Belarusian National Championships in Minsk. In the 100 m backstroke, Sankovich came second in his heat behind Colombia's Omar Pinzón by 0.28 of a second with 55.39 seconds, but failed to advance to the semifinals, finishing twenty-ninth out of 45 entrants in the prelims. Few days later, he joined with Yauheni Lazuka, Viktar Vabishchevich, and two-time Olympian Stanislau Neviarouski for the men's 4 × 100 m medley relay. Swimming the backstroke leg, Sankovich recorded a time of 55.11 seconds, and the Belarusian team went on to finish the heats in sixteenth place, for a total time of 3:39.39.

Four years after competing in his last Olympics, Sankovich qualified for his second Belarusian team, as a 22-year-old, at the 2012 Summer Olympics in London, by eclipsing a FINA B-standard entry time of 54.56 in the men's 100 m backstroke. He was third heat of his 100 m backstroke, and won it with a new Belarusian record of 54.53, but narrowly missed a spot in the semifinals by one hundredth of a second (0.01) behind Olympic veteran Aristeidis Grigoriadis, placing eighteenth out of 43 swimmers in the prelims. In the 100 m butterfly, Sankovich finished the race in thirty-fourth overall by seven hundredths of a second (0.07) behind Switzerland's Dominik Meichtry with 53.47.

=== Post-London era ===
In January 2013, Sankovich attended the Florida State University in Tallahassee, Florida, where he majored in social science. While swimming for the Florida State Seminoles under head coach Frank Bradley, Sankovich had obtained a total of five individual event All-America honors at the NCAA Championships, and set five university records for two consecutive seasons in the 100 m backstroke, 100 m butterfly, and 200 m individual medley.

Sankovich showed a tremendous improvement on the international scene at the 2014 European Championships in Berlin, Germany, overhauling the 52-second barrier in the 100 m butterfly to produce his own lifetime best (51.92) and collect his first ever bronze medal of the meet. The 2015 season brought a stellar feat for Sankovich, as he swam a career best and the world's third fastest time (51.57) in the 100 m butterfly at the Belarus Open, but could not beat his rival Yauhen Tsurkin, who was faster by 0.13 of a second, lowering the Belarusian record.

At the 2016 Olympics, he took part in the 100 m butterfly, finishing in 28th place.

Pavel is now co-owner (with his wife) of the United Swim Club in Tallahassee and was named in 2019 as the head swim coach for Maclay School in Tallahassee, Florida.
