= Aleksei Brianskiy =

Russian swimmer (born 1997)

Personal information
- Born: 14 September 1997 (age 28)

Sport
- Sport: Swimming
Medal record
World Championships (SC)
Gold medal – first place	2016 Windsor	4x100 m freestyle
Gold medal – first place	2016 Windsor	4x50 m medley
Gold medal – first place	2016 Windsor	4x50 m mixed freestyle
Summer Universiade
Bronze medal – third place	2017 Taipei	4x100 m freestyle

Aleksei Sergeyevich Brianskiy (Russian: Алексей Сергеевич Брянский; born 14 September 1997) is a Russian swimmer. He competed in the men's 50 metre freestyle event at the 2016 Summer Olympics.
