= Dávid Földházi =

Hungarian swimmer

Personal information
- Born: 6 January 1995 (age 31)

Sport
- Sport: Swimming

Dávid Földházi (born 6 January 1995) is a Hungarian swimmer. He competed in the men's 200 metre backstroke event at the 2016 Summer Olympics.
