= 2016 FINA World Swimming Championships (25 m) =

- Host city: Windsor, Ontario, Canada
- Date: 6–11 December 2016
- Venue: WFCU Centre
- Nations: 172
- Events: 46

The 13th FINA World Swimming Championships (25 m) were held at the WFCU Centre in Windsor, Ontario, Canada from 6 to 11 December 2016. These championships featured swimming events in a 25-meter (short-course) pool.

== Bidding process ==
In December 2012, FINA president Julio Maglione announced that Windsor, Ontario had won its bid over Hong Kong (one of the host cities in the Swimming World Cup), Abu Dhabi (later hosted the 2021 edition), and Ashgabat.

== Medal summary ==
=== Medal table ===
* Host nation (Canada)

Rank	Nation	Gold	Silver	Bronze	Total
1	United States	9	14	7	30
2	Hungary	7	2	2	11
3	Russia	5	5	3	13
4	South Africa	4	1	0	5
5	South Korea	3	0	0	3
6	Japan	2	3	10	15
7	Canada*	2	3	3	8
8	Netherlands	2	3	1	6
9	Australia	2	2	8	12
10	Germany	2	1	0	3
11	Italy	1	4	2	7
12	Great Britain	1	2	2	5
13	Brazil	1	1	1	3
13	Jamaica	1	1	1	3
15	China	1	0	2	3
16	Denmark	1	0	1	2
16	Lithuania	1	0	1	2
16	Poland	1	0	1	2
19	France	0	2	0	2
20	Slovenia	0	1	0	1
20	Ukraine	0	1	0	1
22	Belarus	0	0	2	2
Totals (22 entries)		46	46	47	139

== Results ==
=== Men's events ===
Event	Gold		Silver		Bronze	
Freestyle
50 m freestyle	Jesse Puts; Netherlands	21.10	Vladimir Morozov; Russia	21.14	Simonas Bilis; Lithuania	21.23
100 m freestyle	Simonas Bilis; Lithuania	46.58	Shinri Shioura; Japan	46.59 AS	Tommaso D'Orsogna; Australia	46.70
200 m freestyle	Park Tae-hwan; South Korea	1:41.03 CR	Chad le Clos; South Africa	1:41.65	Aleksandr Krasnykh; Russia	1:41.95
400 m freestyle	Park Tae-hwan; South Korea	3:34.59	Aleksandr Krasnykh; Russia	3:35.30	Péter Bernek; Hungary	3:37.65
1500 m freestyle	Park Tae-hwan; South Korea	14:15.51 CR, AS	Gregorio Paltrinieri; Italy	14:21.94	Wojciech Wojdak; Poland	14:25.37
Backstroke
50 m backstroke	Junya Koga; Japan	22.85	Jérémy Stravius; France	22.99	Pavel Sankovich; Belarus	23.03
100 m backstroke	Mitch Larkin; Australia	49.65	Andrey Shabasov; Russia	49.69	Xu Jiayu; China	50.02
200 m backstroke	Radosław Kawęcki; Poland	1:47.63	Jacob Pebley; United States	1:48.98	Masaki Kaneko; Japan	1:49.18
Breaststroke
50 m breaststroke	Cameron van der Burgh; South Africa	25.64	Peter Stevens; Slovenia	25.85	Felipe Lima; Brazil	25.98
100 m breaststroke	Marco Koch; Germany	56.77	Vladimir Morozov; Russia	57.00	Fabio Scozzoli; Italy	57.04
200 m breaststroke	Marco Koch; Germany	2:01.21 CR	Andrew Willis; Great Britain	2:02.71	Mikhail Dorinov; Russia	2:03.09
Butterfly
50 m butterfly	Chad le Clos; South Africa	21.98	Tom Shields; United States	22.40	David Morgan; Australia	22.47
100 m butterfly	Chad le Clos; South Africa	48.08 WR	Tom Shields; United States	49.09	David Morgan; Australia	49.31 OC
200 m butterfly	Chad le Clos; South Africa	1:48.76	Tom Shields; United States	1:49.50	Daiya Seto; Japan	1:49.97
Individual medley
100 m individual medley	Michael Andrew; United States	51.84	Daiya Seto; Japan	52.01	Shinri Shioura; Japan	52.17
200 m individual medley	Wang Shun; China	1:51.74	Philip Heintz; Germany	1:52.07	Daiya Seto; Japan	1:52.89
400 m individual medley	Daiya Seto; Japan	3:59.24	Max Litchfield; Great Britain	4:00.66	Dávid Verrasztó; Hungary	4:01.56
Relays
4 × 50 m freestyle relay	Russia; Aleksei Brianskiy (21.70); Nikita Lobintsev (21.06); Aleksandr Popkov (20.85); Vladimir Morozov (20.71); Kirill Prigoda^{[a]}	1:24.32	United States; Paul Powers (21.73); Blake Pieroni (21.14); Michael Chadwick (21.02); Tom Shields (20.58); Dillon Virva^{[a]} Michael Andrew^{[a]}	1:24.47	Japan; Kosuke Matsui (21.81); Kenta Ito (20.96); Shinri Shioura (20.60); Junya Koga (21.14)	1:24.51
4 × 100 m freestyle relay	Russia; Nikita Lobintsev (47.34); Mikhail Vekovishchev (46.96); Vladimir Morozov (45.42); Aleksandr Popkov (46.18); Aleksei Brianskiy^{[a]}	3:05.90	France; Clément Mignon (46.91); Jérémy Stravius (46.21); Jordan Pothain (47.90); Mehdy Metella (46.33); Yonel Govindin^{[a]}	3:07.35	Australia; Brayden McCarthy (47.57); Daniel Smith (46.84); David Morgan (47.48); Tommaso D'Orsogna (45.87); Jack Gerrard^{[a]}	3:07.76
4 × 100 m freestyle relay	Russia; Nikita Lobintsev (47.34); Mikhail Vekovishchev (46.96); Vladimir Morozov (45.42); Aleksandr Popkov (46.18); Aleksei Brianskiy^{[a]}	3:05.90	France; Clément Mignon (46.91); Jérémy Stravius (46.21); Jordan Pothain (47.90); Mehdy Metella (46.33); Yonel Govindin^{[a]}	3:07.35	United States; Michael Chadwick (47.56); Tom Shields (46.59); Paul Powers (47.59); Blake Pieroni (46.02); Matthew Josa^{[a]}	3:07.76
4 × 200 m freestyle relay	United States; Blake Pieroni (1:43.14); Jacob Pebley (1:43.38); Pace Clark (1:44.16); Zane Grothe (1:42.66)	6:53.34	Japan; Yuki Kobori (1:43.97); Daiya Seto (1:42.54); Tsubasa Amai (1:44.11); Katsuhiro Matsumoto (1:42.92)	6:53.54	Australia; Clyde Lewis (1:43.64); Mitch Larkin (1:45.20); Daniel Smith (1:41.58); Alexander Graham (1:43.30); Jack Gerrard^{[a]}	6:53.72
4 × 50 m medley relay	Russia; Andrey Shabasov (23.46); Kirill Prigoda (25.52); Aleksandr Popkov (22.08); Vladimir Morozov (20.46); Grigory Tarasevich^{[a]} Oleg Kostin^{[a]} Daniil Pakhomov^{[a]} Aleksei Brianskiy^{[a]}	1:31.52	United States; Jacob Pebley (23.54); Cody Miller (25.68); Tom Shields (21.94); Michael Chadwick (20.81); Matthew Josa^{[a]} Michael Andrew^{[a]} Paul Powers^{[a]}	1:31.97	Belarus; Pavel Sankovich (23.05); Ilya Shymanovich (25.82); Yauhen Tsurkin (22.59); Anton Latkin (21.03)	1:32.49
4 × 100 m medley relay	Russia; Andrey Shabasov (50.30); Kirill Prigoda (55.78); Aleksandr Kharlanov (49.51); Vladimir Morozov (45.58); Grigory Tarasevich^{[a]} Oleg Kostin^{[a]} Aleksandr Popkov^{[a]}	3:21.17	Australia; Mitch Larkin (50.24); Tommy Sucipto (57.46); David Morgan (49.32); Tommaso D'Orsogna (20.81); Robert Hurley^{[a]} Daniel Smith^{[a]}	3:23.56	Japan; Junya Koga (50.26); Yoshiki Yamanaka (57.57); Takeshi Kawamoto (50.02); Shinri Shioura (46.86); Kenta Ito^{[a]}	3:24.71

=== Women's events ===
Event	Gold		Silver		Bronze	
Freestyle
50 m freestyle	Ranomi Kromowidjojo; Netherlands	23.60	Silvia Di Pietro; Italy	23.90	Madison Kennedy; United States	23.93
100 m freestyle	Brittany Elmslie; Australia	51.81	Ranomi Kromowidjojo; Netherlands	51.92	Penny Oleksiak; Canada	52.01
200 m freestyle	Federica Pellegrini; Italy	1:51.73	Katinka Hosszú; Hungary	1:52.28	Taylor Ruck; Canada	1:52.50
400 m freestyle	Leah Smith; United States	3:57.78	Veronika Popova; Russia	3:58.90	Chihiro Igarashi; Japan	3:59.41
800 m freestyle	Leah Smith; United States	8:10.17	Ashley Twichell; United States	8:11.95	Kiah Melverton; Australia	8:16.51
Backstroke
50 m backstroke	Etiene Medeiros; Brazil	25.82	Katinka Hosszú; Hungary	25.99	Ali DeLoof; United States	26.14
100 m backstroke	Katinka Hosszú; Hungary	55.54	Kylie Masse; Canada	56.24	Georgia Davies; Great Britain	56.45
200 m backstroke	Katinka Hosszú; Hungary	2:00.79	Daryna Zevina; Ukraine	2:02.24	Emily Seebohm; Australia	2:02.65
Breaststroke
50 m breaststroke	Lilly King; United States	28.92	Alia Atkinson; Jamaica	29.11	Molly Hannis; United States	29.58
100 m breaststroke	Alia Atkinson; Jamaica	1:03.03	Lilly King; United States	1:03.35	Molly Hannis; United States	1:03.89
200 m breaststroke	Molly Renshaw; Great Britain	2:18.51	Kelsey Wog; Canada	2:18.52	Chloe Tutton; Great Britain	2:18.83
Butterfly
50 m butterfly	Jeanette Ottesen; Denmark	24.92	Kelsi Worrell; United States	25.27	Rikako Ikee; Japan	25.32
100 m butterfly	Katinka Hosszú; Hungary	55.12	Kelsi Worrell; United States	55.22 AM	Rikako Ikee; Japan	55.64
200 m butterfly	Katinka Hosszú; Hungary	2:02.15	Kelsi Worrell; United States	2:02.89	Zhang Yufei; China	2:05.10
Individual medley
100 m individual medley	Katinka Hosszú; Hungary	57.24	Emily Seebohm; Australia	57.97	Alia Atkinson; Jamaica	58.04
200 m individual medley	Katinka Hosszú; Hungary	2:02.90	Ella Eastin; United States	2:05.02	Madisyn Cox; United States	2:05.93
400 m individual medley	Katinka Hosszú; Hungary	4:21.67	Ella Eastin; United States	4:27.74	Madisyn Cox; United States	4:27.78
Relays
4 × 50 m freestyle relay	Canada; Michelle Williams (24.07); Sandrine Mainville (23.62); Taylor Ruck (23.77); Penny Oleksiak (23.54); Alexia Zevnik^{[a]} Sarah Darcel^{[a]}	1:35.00	Netherlands; Tamara van Vliet (24.45); Ranomi Kromowidjojo (23.11); Maaike de Waard (24.09); Kim Busch (23.72); Maud van der Meer^{[a]}	1:35.37	Italy; Silvia Di Pietro (23.92); Erika Ferraioli (23.52); Aglaia Pezzato (24.06); Federica Pellegrini (24.11)	1:35.61
4 × 100 m freestyle relay	United States; Amanda Weir (52.95); Kelsi Worrell (51.04); Madison Kennedy (52.84); Mallory Comerford (51.99); Ali DeLoof^{[a]} Katie Drabot^{[a]} Katrina Konopka^{[a]}	3:28.82	Italy; Erika Ferraioli (53.51); Silvia Di Pietro (52.06); Aglaia Pezzato (52.52); Federica Pellegrini (52.19)	3:30.28	Netherlands; Maud van der Meer (53.48); Marrit Steenbergen (53.17); Maaike de Waard (53.09); Ranomi Kromowidjojo (51.36); Kim Busch^{[a]} Robin Neumann^{[a]}	3:31.10
4 × 200 m freestyle relay	Canada; Katerine Savard (1:55.53); Taylor Ruck (1:51.69); Kennedy Goss (1:54.62); Penny Oleksiak (1:52.05); Alexia Zevnik^{[a]}	7:33.89	United States; Leah Smith (1:54.87); Mallory Comerford (1:53.32); Sarah Gibson (1:55.43); Madisyn Cox (1:55.03); Katie Drabot^{[a]}	7:38.65	Russia; Daria Mullakaeva (1:57.53); Daria Ustinova (1:55.13); Arina Openysheva (1:54.83); Veronika Popova (1:52.44); Irina Krivonogova^{[a]}	7:39.93
4 × 50 m medley relay	United States; Ali DeLoof (26.12); Lilly King (28.78); Kelsi Worrell (24.44); Katrina Konopka (23.93)	1:43.27 WR	Italy; Silvia Scalia (26.96); Martina Carraro (30.12); Silvia Di Pietro (24.88); Erika Ferraioli (23.42)	1:45.38	Denmark; Mie Nielsen (26.71); Matilde Schroder (30.67); Emilie Beckmann (24.96); Jeanette Ottesen (23.64)	1:45.98
4 × 100 m medley relay	United States; Ali DeLoof (56.68); Lilly King (1:03.71); Kelsi Worrell (55.48); Mallory Comerford (52.02); Hellen Moffitt^{[a]} Molly Hannis^{[a]} Sarah Gibson^{[a]} Amanda Weir^{[a]}	3:47.89 CR	Canada; Kylie Masse (56.29); Rachel Nicol (1:05.13); Katerine Savard (56.38); Penny Oleksiak (51.07); Hilary Caldwell^{[a]} Taylor Ruck^{[a]}	3:48.87	Australia; Emily Seebohm (56.18); Jessica Hansen (1:04.83); Emily Washer (56.90); Brittany Elmslie (51.75)	3:49.66

=== Mixed events ===
Event	Gold		Silver		Bronze	
4 × 50 m freestyle relay	Russia; Aleksei Brianskii (21.40); Vladimir Morozov (20.44); Maria Kameneva (24.01); Rozaliya Nasretdinova (23.88); Aleksandr Popkov^{[a]}	1:29.73	Netherlands; Jesse Puts (21.27); Nyls Korstanje (21.15); Ranomi Kromowidjojo (23.34); Maaike de Waard (24.06); Kim Busch^{[a]} Tamara van Vliet^{[a]}	1:29.82	Canada; Yuri Kisil (21.39); Markus Thormeyer (21.28); Michelle Williams (23.48); Sandrine Mainville (23.68); Mirando Richard-Jarry^{[a]} Katerine Savard^{[a]} Alexia Zevnik^{[a]}	1:29.83
4 × 50 m medley relay	United States; Tom Shields (23.45); Lilly King (28.74); Kelsi Worrell (24.59); Michael Chadwick (20.44); Ali DeLoof^{[a]} Cody Miller^{[a]} Matthew Josa^{[a]} Mallory Comerford^{[a]}	1:37.22 CR	Brazil; Etiene Medeiros (25.93); Felipe Lima (25.46); Nicholas Santos (21.93); Larissa Oliveira (24.42)	1:37.74	Japan; Junya Koga (22.74); Yoshiki Yamanaka (26.48); Rikako Ikee (24.89); Sayuki Ouchi (24.34); Emy Moronuki^{[a]} Takeshi Kawamoto^{[a]}	1:38.45

^{a} Swimmers who participated in the heats only and received medals.
