= Simon Sjödin =

Swedish swimmer

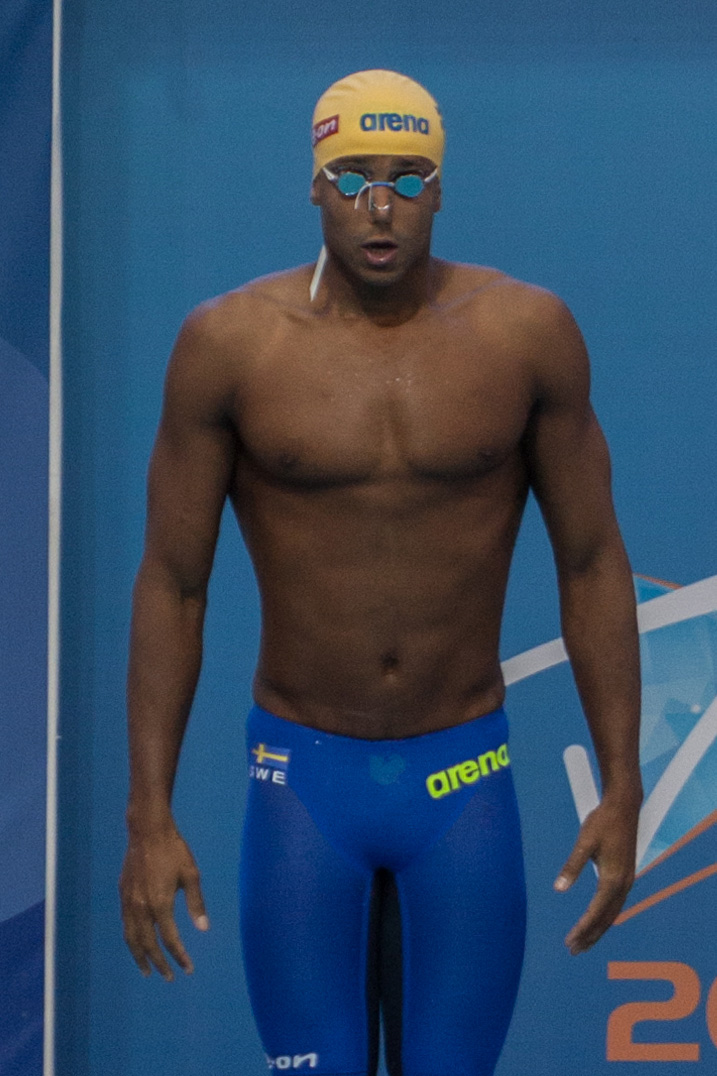
- Netanya 2015

Personal information
- Full name: Simon Olov Sjödin
- National team: Sweden
- Born: 4 October 1986 (age 39) Stockholm, Sweden
- Height: 1.92 m (6 ft 4 in)
- Weight: 85 kg (187 lb)

Sport
- Sport: Swimming
- Strokes: Butterfly, medley
- Club: SK Neptun
Medal record
Men's swimming
Representing Sweden
European Championships (LC)
Bronze medal – third place	2008 Eindhoven	4×100 m medley
European Championships (SC)
Silver medal – second place	2013 Herning	200 m medley
Bronze medal – third place	2015 Netanya	200 m butterfly

Simon Olov Sjödin (born 4 October 1986) is a Swedish competitive swimmer who represented Sweden at both the 2008 Olympic Games and the 2016 Olympic Games. He is of Gambian descent.

== Biography ==
Simon Sjödin was born on 4 October 1986 into parents Kristina and Omar.

Sjödin won his first Swedish Swimming Championships title in 2005, when he won the 200 meter butterfly.

In 2007, he changed swim club from Södertörns SS to SK Neptun.

In 2008, Simon Sjödin competed in the 2008 Summer Olympics representing Sweden. He finished 26th in the 200 m butterfly and 11th with the Swedish team in the 4 × 100 m medley relay.

In 2016, he competed in the 2016 Summer Olympics having qualified to swim both 200 m butterfly and 200 m individual medley. Simon reached the semi-final in 200 m butterfly with a time of 1.56.46 beating the Swedish national record in the process. In the semi-final he ended up at 6th place in his heat and ranked 13th overall.

== Personal bests ==
=== Long course (50 m) ===
Event	Time		Date	Meet	Location	Ref
100 m backstroke	55.27	NR (rh)	15 Aug 2008	Olympic Games	Beijing, China	
200 m backstroke	2:02.19	NR	1 Jul 2009	Swedish Championships	Linköping, Sweden	
100 m butterfly	52.27	(h)	31 Jul 2009	World Championships	Rome, Italy	
200 m butterfly	1:57.01	NR (h)	28 Jul 2009	World Championships	Rome, Italy	
200 m individual medley	1:59.16	NR	5 Apr 2013	2013 Eindhoven Cup	Eindhoven, Netherlands	
400 m individual medley	4:21.52	NR	25 Mar 2010	Amsterdam Swim Cup	Amsterdam, Netherlands	

Legend: WR – World record; ER – European record; NR – Swedish record;
Records not set in finals: h – heat; sf – semifinal; r – relay 1st leg; rh – relay heat 1st leg; b – B final; † – en route to final mark; so – swim-off; tt – time trial

=== Short course (25 m) ===
Event	Time		Date	Meet	Location	Ref
200 m backstroke	1:58.52		23 Nov 2007	Swedish SC Championships	Jönköping, Sweden	
100 m butterfly	52.66		18 Oct 2008	World Cup	Durban, South Africa	
200 m butterfly	1:52.90	NR (h)	10 Nov 2009	World Cup	Stockholm, Sweden	
200 m individual medley	1:55.72	NR	11 Nov 2009	World Cup	Stockholm, Sweden	
400 m individual medley	4:13.08		30 Nov 2008	Swedish SC Championships	Stockholm, Sweden	

Legend: WR – World record; ER – European record; NR – Swedish record;
Records not set in finals: h – heat; sf – semifinal; r – relay 1st leg; rh – relay heat 1st leg; b – B final; † – en route to final mark; so – swim-off; tt – time trial

== Clubs ==
- Södertörns SS (-2007)
- SK Neptun (2007-)
